= 2019 FC Sheriff Tiraspol season =

Sheriff Tiraspol
2019 season
- Chairman: Viktor Gushan
- Manager: Goran Sablić (until 27 April); Zoran Zekić (from 30 April)
- Stadium: Sheriff Stadium
- Divizia Naţională: 1st
- 2018–19 Moldovan Cup: Winners
- 2019–20 Moldovan Cup: Quarter-final
- Moldovan Super Cup: Runners-up
- Champions League: First qualifying round
- Europa League: Third qualifying round
- Top goalscorer: League: Yury Kendysh (13); All: Yury Kendysh (20)
Home colours	Away colours

The 2019 season was FC Sheriff Tiraspol's 23rd season, and their 22nd in the Divizia Naţională, the top-flight of Moldovan football. Sheriff defended their Divizia Naţională title, winning it for the 18th time whilst also winning the 2018–19 Moldovan Cup and progressing to the Quarterfinal stage of the 2019–20 Moldovan Cup that will take place in the 2020 season. In Europe, Sheriff were knocked out of the Champions League by Saburtalo Tbilisi in the first qualifying round and then by AIK at the third qualifying round of the Europa League.

== Season events ==
On 27 April, Goran Sablić resigned as manager, with Zoran Zekić returning as manager on 30 April. On 14 November, Cristiano extended his contract with Sheriff Tiraspol, which was due to end at the end of the 2020 season.

== Squad ==
As of match 9 November 2019

No.	Name	Nationality	Position	Date of birth (age)	Signed from	Signed in	Contract ends	Apps.	Goals
Goalkeepers
1	Dumitru Celeadnic	(Moldova)	GK	23 April 1992 (aged 27)	Petrocub Hîncești	2019		30	0
20	Zvonimir Mikulić	(Croatia)	GK	5 February 1990 (aged 29)	Osijek	2017		52	0
33	Serghei Pașcenco	(Moldova)	GK	18 December 1982 (aged 36)	Zaria Bălți	2018		127+	0
Defenders
3	Mateo Mužek	(Croatia)	DF	29 April 1995 (aged 24)	St Mirren	2019		14	0
4	Matej Palčič	(Slovenia)	DF	21 June 1993 (aged 26)	Wisła Kraków	2019		6	0
14	Wilfried Balima	(Burkina Faso)	DF	20 March 1985 (aged 34)	US Ouagadougou	2005		390+	61+
15	Cristiano	(Brazil)	DF	29 August 1993 (aged 26)	Volta Redonda	2018		100	2
17	Alexandr Belousov	(Moldova)	DF	14 May 1998 (aged 21)	Youth Team	2018		40	4
22	Vadim Dijinari	(Moldova)	DF	1 April 1999 (aged 20)	Youth Team	2019		5	2
23	Artem Hordiyenko	(Ukraine)	DF	4 March 1991 (aged 28)	Zorya Luhansk	2019		14	1
44	Andrej Lukić	(Croatia)	DF	2 April 1994 (aged 25)	loan from Braga	2019		15	3
90	Veaceslav Posmac	(Moldova)	DF	7 November 1990 (aged 29)	Dacia Chișinău	2017		95	5
91	Ousmane N'Diaye	(Senegal)	DF	19 August 1991 (aged 28)	Osmanlıspor	2019		20	2
Midfielders
6	Denis Macalici	(Moldova)	MF	19 April 2000 (aged 19)	Youth Team	2019		1	0
7	Andriy Bliznichenko	(Ukraine)	MF	24 July 1994 (aged 25)	Kardemir Karabükspor	2019		5	3
8	Mihail Ghecev	(Moldova)	MF	5 November 1997 (aged 22)	Petrocub Hîncești	2019		10	5
16	Ariel Borysiuk	(Poland)	MF	29 July 1991 (aged 28)	Lechia Gdańsk	2019		12	1
18	Gheorghe Anton	(Moldova)	MF	27 January 1993 (aged 26)	Zimbru Chișinău	2017		80	3
19	Antun Palić	(Croatia)	MF	25 June 1998 (aged 21)	Dinamo București	2018		37	4
27	Liridon Latifi	(Albania)	MF	6 February 1994 (aged 25)	loan from Puskás Akadémia	2019	2020	19	5
32	Nichita Kholodov	(Moldova)	MF	28 May 2003 (aged 16)	Youth Team	2019		2	0
77	Yury Kendysh	(Belarus)	MF	10 June 1990 (aged 29)	BATE Borisov	2018		77	24
98	Maxim Cojocaru	(Moldova)	MF	13 January 1998 (aged 21)	Petrocub Hîncești	2019		33	4
Forwards
24	Evghenii Berco	(Moldova)	FW	9 October 1999 (aged 20)	Youth Team	2019		3	0
29	Robert Tambe	(Cameroon)	FW	22 February 1994 (aged 25)	loan from CFR Cluj	2019		35	17
70	Leandro	(Brazil)	FW	13 January 1995 (aged 24)	Dila Gori	2019		30	9
76	Gabrijel Boban	(Croatia)	FW	23 July 1989 (aged 30)	NK Osijek	2019		17	6
Out on loan
4	Artiom Rozgoniuc	(Moldova)	DF	1 October 1995 (aged 24)	Trainee	2013		33	0
21	Nicolai Cebotari	(Moldova)	GK	24 May 1997 (aged 22)	Sfântul Gheorghe	2018		2	0
	Vadim Paireli	(Moldova)	MF	8 November 1995 (aged 24)	Trainee	2013		66	6
Left during the season
6	Jarosław Jach	(Poland)	DF	17 February 1994 (aged 25)	loan from Crystal Palace	2019		23	1
9	Patrick Pedersen	(Denmark)	FW	25 November 1991 (aged 27)	Valur	2019		19	5
10	José Ángel	(Spain)	MF	21 June 1992 (aged 27)	Bodø/Glimt	2019		18	3
23	Vladimir Kovačević	(Serbia)	DF	29 August 1993 (aged 26)	loan from Kortrijk	2018		25	2
32	Evgheni Oancea	(Moldova)	MF	5 January 1996 (aged 23)	Trainee	2016		70	14
39	Ziguy Badibanga	(Belgium)	FW	26 November 1991 (aged 27)	Omonia	2017		64	20
55	Mateo Sušić	(Bosnia and Herzegovina)	DF	18 November 1990 (aged 28)	CFR Cluj	2015		144	4

=== Out on loan ===
Note: Flags indicate national team as defined under FIFA eligibility rules; some limited exceptions apply. Players may hold more than one non-FIFA nationality.

No.	Pos.	Nation	Player
4	DF	MDA	Artiom Rozgoniuc (at Sfântul Gheorghe)
21	GK	MDA	Nicolai Cebotari (at Sfântul Gheorghe Suruceni)

No.	Pos.	Nation	Player
—	MF	MDA	Vadim Paireli (at Sfântul Gheorghe Suruceni)

== Transfers ==
=== In ===
Date	Position	Nationality	Name	From	Fee	Ref.
12 December 2018	FW	(Denmark)	Patrick Pedersen	Valur	Undisclosed	
21 December 2018	FW	(Brazil)	Leandro	Dila Gori	Undisclosed	
4 January 2019	GK	(Moldova)	Dumitru Celeadnic	Petrocub Hîncești	Undisclosed	
18 January 2019	DF	(Moldova)	Maxim Cojocaru	Petrocub Hîncești	Undisclosed	
6 March 2019	MF	(Moldova)	Mihail Ghecev	Petrocub Hîncești	Undisclosed	
6 June 2019	DF	(Ukraine)	Artem Hordiyenko	Zorya Luhansk	Undisclosed	
24 June 2019	DF	(Slovenia)	Matej Palčič	Wisła Kraków	Undisclosed	
26 June 2019	FW	(Croatia)	Gabrijel Boban	NK Osijek	Undisclosed	
27 June 2019	DF	(Senegal)	Ousmane N'Diaye	Osmanlıspor	Undisclosed	
4 July 2019	DF	(Croatia)	Mateo Mužek	St Mirren	Undisclosed	
29 July 2019	MF	(Poland)	Ariel Borysiuk	Lechia Gdańsk	Free	

=== Loans in ===
Date from	Position	Nationality	Name	From	Date to	Ref.
22 June 2018	MF	(Bosnia and Herzegovina)	Rifet Kapić	Grasshoppers	22 January 2019	
24 June 2019	MF	(Albania)	Liridon Latifi	Puskás Akadémia	12 July 2020	
25 June 2018	DF	(Croatia)	Vladimir Kovačević	Kortrijk	30 June 2019	
24 January 2019	FW	(Cameroon)	Robert Tambe	CFR Cluj		
2 February 2019	DF	(Poland)	Jarosław Jach	Crystal Palace	31 August 2019	
15 February 2019	MF	(Spain)	José Ángel	Bodø/Glimt	27 August 2019	
1 August 2019	DF	(Croatia)	Andrej Lukić	Braga	Undisclosed	

=== Out ===
Date	Position	Nationality	Name	To	Fee	Ref.
16 January 2019	FW	(Luxembourg)	Gerson Rodrigues	Júbilo Iwata	Undisclosed	
30 January 2019	DF	(Croatia)	Ante Kulušić	Ankaragücü	Undisclosed	
10 June 2019	DF	(Bosnia and Herzegovina)	Mateo Sušić	CFR Cluj	Undisclosed	

=== Loans out ===
Date from	Position	Nationality	Name	To	Date to	Ref.
Summer 2018	MF	(Moldova)	Vadim Paireli	Sfântul Gheorghe	End of Season	
Winter 2018	GK	(Moldova)	Nicolai Cebotari	Sfântul Gheorghe	End of Season	
April 2019	DF	(Moldova)	Artiom Rozgoniuc	Sfântul Gheorghe	End of Season	

=== Released ===
Date	Position	Nationality	Name	Joined	Date	Ref.
Winter 2018	MF	(Curaçao)	Jeremy de Nooijer	Sūduva	6 March 2019	
Winter 2018	FW	(Burkina Faso)	Abdoul Gafar Sirima	Artsakh		
16 December 2018	DF	(Moldova)	Petru Racu	Neftchi Baku	15 February 2019	
31 December 2018	FW	(Brazil)	Jô Santos	Ventspils	25 January 2019	
31 December 2018	FW	(Sierra Leone)	Alhaji Kamara	Vendsyssel	19 February 2019	
3 April 2019	FW	(Belgium)	Ziguy Badibanga	Ordabasy	4 April 2019	
Summer 2019	MF	(Moldova)	Evgheni Oancea	Torpedo Minsk		
1 July 2019	FW	(Denmark)	Patrick Pedersen	Valur		
31 December 2019	DF	(Burkina Faso)	Wilfried Balima	Retired	24 January 2020	
31 December 2019	DF	(Croatia)	Mateo Mužek	AEL		
31 December 2019	MF	(Belarus)	Yury Kendysh	Shakhtyor Soligorsk	1 January 2019	
31 December 2019	MF	(Croatia)	Antun Palić	Kaposvári Rákóczi		
31 December 2019	MF	(Moldova)	Gheorghe Anton	Zira	25 January 2020	
31 December 2019	MF	(Moldova)	Denis Macalici			
31 December 2019	MF	(Ukraine)	Artem Hordiyenko	Oleksandriya		
31 December 2019	FW	(Moldova)	Evghenii Berco			

== Friendlies ==
3 February 2019	Sheriff Tiraspol (Moldova)	1–2	(Bosnia and Herzegovina) Široki Brijeg	Belek, Turkey
17:00 EET (UTC+2)	Kendysh	Report	Goal

7 February 2019	Sheriff Tiraspol (Moldova)	1–2	(Ukraine) Olimpik Donetsk	Belek, Turkey
17:00 EET (UTC+2)	Jach	Report	Goal

11 February 2019	Sheriff Tiraspol (Moldova)	3–1	(South Korea) Daejeon Citizen	Belek, Turkey
16:00 EET (UTC+2)	Tambe; Cojocaru	Report	Goal

20 February 2019	Sheriff Tiraspol (Moldova)	1–1	(Georgia (country)) Dila Gori	Belek, Turkey
16:30 EET (UTC+2)	Palić	Report	Goal

23 February 2019	Sheriff Tiraspol (Moldova)	2–1	(Russia) Spartak Moscow	Belek, Turkey
16:00 EET (UTC+2)	Kovačević; Palić	Report	Goal

26 February 2019	Sheriff Tiraspol (Moldova)	1–2	(Belarus) Shakhtyor Soligorsk	Belek, Turkey
EET (UTC+2)	Pedersen	Report	Goal

1 March 2019	Sheriff Tiraspol (Moldova)	2–1	(Turkmenistan) Altyn Asyr	Belek, Turkey
16:00 EET (UTC+2)	Cojocaru; Tambe (pen.)	Report	Goal

== Competitions ==
=== Moldovan Super Cup ===
10 March 2019	Sheriff Tiraspol	0–0 (a.e.t.) (4–5 p)	Milsami Orhei	Tiraspol
16:00 EET (UTC+2)	Palić (yellow card) 42'; Cristiano (yellow card) 72'	Report	Rusnac (yellow card) 62'; Rață (yellow card) 65'; G.Andronic (yellow card) 72'; Onica (yellow card) 75'; Antoniuc (yellow card) 86'	Stadium: Sheriff Stadium; Attendance: 3,000; Referee: Alexandr Tean
	Penalties
	Oancea (penalty scored); Pedersen (penalty scored); Tambe (penalty scored); Anton (penalty scored); Cristiano (penalty missed)		(penalty scored) Bolohan; (penalty scored) Crăciun; (penalty scored) Onica; (penalty scored) G.Andronic; (penalty scored) Mîțu

=== Divizia Națională ===
==== Results summary ====
Overall								Home						Away					
Pld	W	D	L	GF	GA	GD	Pts	W	D	L	GF	GA	GD	W	D	L	GF	GA	GD
28	22	4	2	60	9	+51	70	12	1	1	31	5	+26	10	3	1	29	4	+25

Last updated: 9 November 2019.
Source: See Results

==== Results ====
16 March 2019 1	Sheriff Tiraspol	1–0	Speranța Nisporeni	Tiraspol
17:00 EET (UTC+2)	Tambe (yellow card) 69'; Bliznichenko 82'	Report	Sandu (yellow card) 35'; M.Bolun (yellow card) 85'	Stadium: Malaya Sportivnaya Arena; Attendance: 500; Referee: Gabriel Tupicico

29 March 2019 2	Sheriff Tiraspol	3–0	Zimbru Chișinău	Tiraspol
17:00 EET (UTC+2)	Tambe 19', 39'; Leandro 51'; Kendysh (yellow card) 88'	Report	A.Cojocari (yellow card) 34'; P.Neagu (yellow card) 89'	Stadium: Malaya Sportivnaya Arena; Attendance: 1,500; Referee: Andrei Bregutse

3 April 2019 3	Dinamo-Auto Tiraspol	0–4	Sheriff Tiraspol	Tiraspol
14:00 EEST (UTC+3)	A.Bilinschii (yellow card) 52'; Macrițchii (yellow card) 77'; Bugaiov (penalty missed) 86'	Report	Bliznichenko 15', 90'; Pedersen (yellow card) 24'; José Ángel 45' (pen.); Ghecev (yellow card) 69'; Kovačević 79'; Sušić (yellow card) 85'	Stadium: Dinamo-Auto Stadium; Attendance: 200; Referee: Andrei Cheband

7 April 2019 4	Sheriff Tiraspol	0–1	Milsami Orhei	Tiraspol
17:00 EEST (UTC+3)	Pedersen (yellow card) 62'; Tambe (yellow card) 68'; Jach (yellow card) 84'	Report	Plătică 17' (yellow card) 19' (yellow-red card) 48'; Mîțu (yellow card) 88'; Rusnac (yellow card) 90'	Stadium: Sheriff Stadium; Attendance: 1,500; Referee: Alexandr Tean

12 April 2019 5	Sfântul Gheorghe	0–3	Sheriff Tiraspol	Suruceni
14:00 EEST (UTC+3)	G.Kirakosyan (yellow card) 30'; Focșa (yellow card) 54'; D.Reniță (yellow card) 77'	Report	Posmac 27'; Kendysh 34'; Cojocaru (yellow card) 39'; Pedersen 46'	Stadium: Suruceni Stadium; Attendance: 150; Referee: Ion Orlik

19 April 2019 6	Sheriff Tiraspol	2–1	Codru Lozova	Tiraspol
18:00 EEST (UTC+3)	Oancea 32'; Ángel 52'; Palić (yellow card) 83'	Report	I.Mamaliga 42'; Costin (yellow card) 30'	Stadium: Sheriff Stadium; Attendance: 700; Referee: Andrei Bregutse

26 April 2019 7	Petrocub Hîncești	1–0	Sheriff Tiraspol	Hîncești
18:30 EEST (UTC+3)	Taras 70'; G.Coșcodan (yellow card) 80'; Puntus (yellow card) 90+1'; Jardan (yellow card) 90+3'	Report	Leandro (yellow card) 70'	Stadium: Stadionul Municipal; Attendance: 1,000; Referee: Vladislav Ivanchenko

3 May 2019 8	Speranța Nisporeni	0–4	Sheriff Tiraspol	Nisporeni
19:00 EEST (UTC+3)		Report	Palić 45+1'; Balima 51'; Pedersen 79'; Leandro 88'; Posmac (yellow card) 90'	Stadium: Stadionul Mircea Eliade; Attendance: 200; Referee: Alexander Tyan

12 May 2019 9	Zimbru Chișinău	0–4	Sheriff Tiraspol	Chișinău
19:00 EEST (UTC+3)	Furtună (yellow card) 23'; Iurașco (yellow card) 33'; Pîslă (yellow card) 73' (yellow-red card) 79'	Report	Tambe 35', 66'; Cojocaru 51'; Pedersen 87'	Stadium: Zimbru Stadium; Attendance: 1,000; Referee: Alexander Tyan

18 May 2019 10	Sheriff Tiraspol	3–0	Dinamo-Auto Tiraspol	Tiraspol
19:00 EEST (UTC+3)	Oancea 8', 55'; Leandro 30'; Ghecev (yellow card) 63'; Ángel (yellow card) 85'	Report	N.Ciumacenko (yellow card) 20'; Nihaev (yellow card) 25'; Macriţchii (yellow card) 89'	Stadium: Sheriff Stadium; Attendance: 750; Referee: Andrei Cheban

26 May 2019 11	Milsami Orhei	1–2	Sheriff Tiraspol	Orhei
19:00 EEST (UTC+3)	Plătică (yellow card) 40'; Ibrian 76'; Rusnac (yellow card) 90'	Report	Kendysh 11'; Cojocaru 48'; Sušić (yellow card) 72'; Anton (yellow card) 81'	Stadium: CSR Orhei; Attendance: 1,800; Referee: Peter Staryanov

31 May 2019 12	Sheriff Tiraspol	5–0	Sfântul Gheorghe	Tiraspol
19:00 EEST (UTC+3)	Mazur 17' (o.g.); Kendysh 30'; Tambe 58'; Kovačević 62'; Cojocaru 74'	Report	Cemîrtan (yellow card) 4'	Stadium: Sheriff Stadium; Attendance: 600; Referee: Ion Orlik

15 June 2019 13	Codru Lozova	0–2	Sheriff Tiraspol	Chișinău
18:00 EEST (UTC+3)	Bursuc (yellow card) 45'; D.Janu (yellow card) 74'; Zabun (yellow card) 84'	Report	Kendysh 27', 54'; Jach (yellow card) 36'; Cojocaru (yellow card) 49'	Stadium: Baza Zimbru; Attendance: 250; Referee: Gabriel Tupicico

21 June 2019 14	Sheriff Tiraspol	2–0	Petrocub Hîncești	Tiraspol
20:00 EEST (UTC+3)	Kendysh 12' (pen.) (yellow card) 42'; Balima 24'; Belousov (yellow card) 81'; Anton (yellow card) 88'	Report		Stadium: Sheriff Stadium; Attendance: 1,000; Referee: Petru Stoianov

29 June 2019 15	Sheriff Tiraspol	3–0	Speranța Nisporeni	Tiraspol
20:00 EEST (UTC+3)	Posmac 17' (yellow card) 70'; Kendysh 29'; Cojocaru 51'; Leandro (yellow card) 71'	Report	M.Bolun (yellow card) 58'	Stadium: Sheriff Stadium; Attendance: 1,200; Referee: Alexander Tian

4 August 2019 16	Sheriff Tiraspol	3–0	Zimbru Chișinău	Tiraspol
20:00 EEST (UTC+3)	Tambe 61', 72'; Leandro 66'; Anton (yellow card) 87'	Report	Scoarță (yellow card) 44'	Stadium: Sheriff Stadium; Attendance: 1,100; Referee: Andrei Bregute

11 August 2019 17	Dinamo-Auto Tiraspol	0–3	Sheriff Tiraspol	Tiraspol
18:00 EEST (UTC+3)	M.Gorbakov (yellow card) 49'; Novruzov (yellow card) 52'	Report	Ghecev 6', 59'; Tambe 84'	Stadium: Dinamo-Auto Stadium; Attendance: 100; Referee: Iurie Covtun

18 August 2019 18	Sheriff Tiraspol	2–1	Milsami Orhei	Tiraspol
20:00 EEST (UTC+3)	Kendysh 3'; Ghecev (yellow card) 31'; Belousov (yellow card) 34'; Boban 40'	Report	Bogdan (yellow card) 23'; Stînă 41' (yellow card) 44'	Stadium: Sheriff Stadium; Attendance: 1,000; Referee: Alexandr Tean

24 August 2019 19	Sheriff Tiraspol	2–1	Sfântul Gheorghe	Tiraspol
20:00 EEST (UTC+3)	Belousov 10'; Kendysh 35'	Report	Plămădeală (yellow card) 40'; Ojog (yellow card) 54'; Mandrîcenco 55'	Stadium: Malaya Sportivnaya Arena; Attendance: 950; Referee: Vladislav Ivancenco

31 August 2019 20	Sheriff Tiraspol	2–1	Codru Lozova	Tiraspol
20:00 EEST (UTC+3)	Ghecev (yellow card) 24'; Kendysh 65'; Balima 79'	Report	D.Buhanenco (yellow card) 50'; C.Ursu (yellow card) 67'; Belevschi (yellow card) 77'	Stadium: Sheriff Stadium; Attendance: 940; Referee: Andrei Breguța

14 September 2019 21	Petrocub Hîncești	0–0	Sheriff Tiraspol	Hîncești
19:00 EEST (UTC+3)		Report	Borysiuk (yellow card) 32'; Cristiano (yellow card) 42'; Boban (yellow card) 73'; Cojocaru (yellow card) 86'	Stadium: Stadionul Municipal; Attendance: 500; Referee: Gabriel Tupichko

21 September 2019 22	Speranța Nisporeni	0–0	Sheriff Tiraspol	Nisporeni
19:00 EEST (UTC+3)		Report	N'Diaye (yellow card) 70'	Stadium: Stadionul Mircea Eliade; Attendance: 100; Referee: Alexander Tyan

28 September 2019 23	Zimbru Chișinău	1–2	Sheriff Tiraspol	Chișinău
19:00 EEST (UTC+3)	Pîslă (yellow card) 55' (goal) 67'; Arhirii (yellow card) 70'; Bogaciuc (yellow card) 75'	Report	Kendysh 27', 84' (yellow card) 69'; N'Diaye (yellow card) 73'; Lukić (yellow card) 80'	Stadium: Zimbru Stadium; Attendance: 500; Referee: Petru Stoianov

6 October 2019 24	Sheriff Tiraspol	2–0	Dinamo-Auto Tiraspol	Tiraspol
20:00 EEST (UTC+3)	Lukić 35', 41'; Latifi (yellow card) 59'	Report	Bugaiov (yellow card) 38'; Masalov (yellow card) 84'; N.Solodovnikov (yellow card) 90+1'	Stadium: Sheriff Stadium; Attendance: 510; Referee: Yuri Kovtun

19 October 2019 25	Milsami Orhei	1–1	Sheriff Tiraspol	Orhei
16:00 EEST (UTC+3)	Bogdan 38'; Plătică (yellow card) 53'; Rusnac (yellow card) 60'; Jardan (yellow card) 63'	Report	Latifi 49' (yellow card) 68'; Lukić (yellow card) 51'; Celeadnic (yellow card) 90+6'	Stadium: CSR Orhei; Attendance: 500; Referee: Veaceslav Banari

26 October 2019 26	Sfântul Gheorghe	0–1	Sheriff Tiraspol	Suruceni
15:00 EEST (UTC+3)	Rozgoniuc (yellow card) 24'	Report	Lukić 80'	Stadium: Suruceni Stadium; Attendance: 150; Referee: Vyacheslav Banary

2 November 2019 27	Codru Lozova	0–3	Sheriff Tiraspol	Chișinău
13:00 EET (UTC+2)	E.Zaplitnîi (yellow card) 64'; G.Coșcodan (yellow card) 66'	Report	Kendysh 30'; V.Dijinari 35'; Lukić (yellow card) 70'; Tambe 86'	Stadium: Baza Zimbru; Attendance: 50; Referee: Ion Bila

9 November 2019 28	Sheriff Tiraspol	1–1	Petrocub Hîncești	Tiraspol
13:00 EET (UTC+2)	Borysiuk 69'	Report	Țurcan 7'; Bejan (yellow card) 52'; Avram (yellow card) 90'	Stadium: Sheriff Stadium; Referee: Alexander Tyan

==== League table ====
Pos	Team	Pld	W	D	L	GF	GA	GD	Pts	Qualification or relegation
1	Sheriff Tiraspol (C)	28	22	4	2	60	9	+51	70	Qualification for the Champions League first qualifying round
2	Sfîntul Gheorghe	28	16	5	7	40	28	+12	53	Qualification for the Europa League first qualifying round (Note: Since the winners of 2019–20 Moldovan Cup, Petrocub-Hîncești, qualified for European competition based on their league position, the spot awarded to the Cup winner (Europa League first qualifying round) was passed to the next best-placed team (the fourth-placed team).)
3	Petrocub-Hîncești	28	14	8	6	34	21	+13	50	Qualification for the Europa League first qualifying round
4	Dinamo-Auto	28	12	5	11	38	37	+1	41	Qualification for the Europa League first qualifying round
5	Milsami Orhei	28	10	9	9	30	28	+2	39	

Source: FMF, UEFA, Soccerway
Rules for classification: 1) Points; 2) Play-off (only if deciding champion when two teams tied); 3) Head-to-head points; 4) Head-to-head goal difference; 5) Head-to-head away goals scored; 6) Head-to-head goals scored; 7) Matches won; 8) Goal difference; 9) Goals scored; 10) Less red cards; 11) Less yellow cards.
(C) Champions

=== Moldovan Cup ===
==== 2018–19 ====
16 April 2019 Semifinal 1st leg	Sheriff Tiraspol	2–0	Milsami Orhei	Tiraspol
18:00 EEST (UTC+3)	Kendysh (yellow card) 41'; Posmac (yellow card) 51'; Cristiano (yellow card) 65'; Tambe 79', 84'	Report	Bolohan (yellow card) 45'; Plătică (yellow card) 90'	Stadium: Sheriff Stadium; Referee: Gabriel Tupicko

7 May 2019 Semifinal 2nd leg	Milsami Orhei	0–0 (0–2 agg.)	Sheriff Tiraspol	Orhei
18:00 EEST (UTC+3)	M.Antoniuc (yellow card) 8'; Plătică (yellow card) 10'; Crăciun (yellow card) 17'; Stînă (yellow card) 57'	Report	Jach (yellow card) 22'; Anton (yellow card) 23'	Stadium: CSR Orhei; Attendance: 960; Referee: Vladislav Ivanchenko

===== Final =====
22 May 2019	Sheriff Tiraspol	1–0 (a.e.t.)	Sfântul Gheorghe	Chișinău
20:30 EEST (UTC+3)	Ghecev (yellow card) 77'; Leandro 92'; Kendysh (yellow card) 99'	Report	Svinarenco (yellow card) 45'; Rozgoniuc (yellow card) 108'; Focșa (yellow card) 108'	Stadium: Zimbru Stadium; Attendance: 5,250; Referee: Istvan Kovac

==== 2019–20 ====
25 June 2019 Last 16 1st leg	Sheriff Tiraspol	12–0	Sireți	Tiraspol
19:00 EEST (UTC+3)	Anton 20'; Tambe 24', 79'; Leandro 39'; Palić 44'; Jach 55'; Pedersen 63', 80'; V.Dijinari 68'; Ghecev 72', 74', 88'	Report		Stadium: Malaya Sportivnaya Arena; Referee: Ion Orlik

5 July 2019 Last 16 2nd leg	Sireți	0–15 (0–27 agg.)	Sheriff Tiraspol	Tiraspol
19:00 EEST (UTC+3)	P.Ursu (yellow card) 34'; Y.Mihaj (yellow card) 37'	Report	Latifi 5', 52', 79'; Tambe 7', 12'; Hordiyenko 21'; Kendysh 34', 52', 69', 89'; Boban 43', 48'; Leandro 59', 84'; Ángel 87'	Stadium: Sheriff Stadium; Referee: Andrei Diordiev
Note: Match moved to the Sheriff Stadium on 1 July 2019.

25 September 2019 Quarterfinal 1st leg	Sheriff Tiraspol	1–0	Dinamo-Auto Tiraspol	Tiraspol
19:00 EEST (UTC+3)	D.Macalici (yellow card) 9'; Hordiyenko (yellow card) 61'; Boban 79'; Posmac (yellow card) 90+3'	Report	Rogac (yellow card) 90+3'; Rebenja (yellow card) 90+3'	Stadium: Sheriff Stadium; Attendance: 700; Referee: Andrei Diordiev

29 October 2019 Quarterfinal 2nd leg	Dinamo-Auto Tiraspol	0–5 (0–6 agg.)	Sheriff Tiraspol	Tîrnauca
13:00 EET (UTC+2)		Report	Kendysh 24', 90+2'; Boban 28'; N'Diaye 39'; Leandro 66'	Stadium: Dinamo-Auto Stadium; Referee: Gennady Sidenko

Semifinals took place during the 2020 season.

=== UEFA Champions League ===
==== Qualifying rounds ====
10 July 2019 First qualifying round 1st leg	Sheriff Tiraspol (Moldova)	0–3	(Georgia (country)) Saburtalo Tbilisi	Tiraspol, Moldova
20:00 EEST (UTC+3)	Kendysh (yellow card) 34'	Report	Rolović 30'; Kokhreidze (yellow card) 44' (goal) 67'; Lakvekheliani (yellow card) 58'; Kakubava 71' (yellow card) 78'	Stadium: Sheriff Stadium; Attendance: 5,706; Referee: Iwan Arwel Griffith (Wales)

16 July 2019 First qualifying round 2nd leg	Saburtalo Tbilisi (Georgia (country))	1–3 (4–3 agg.)	(Moldova) Sheriff Tiraspol	Tbilisi, Georgia
21:00 EEST (UTC+3)	G.Kokhreidze (yellow card) 23'; Gonçalves (yellow card) 39'; Rolović 59'; G.Margvelashvili (yellow card) 78'	Report	Latifi 3'; Margvelashvili 8' (o.g.); Tambe 11'; Palčič (yellow card) 12' (yellow-red card) 72'; Hordiyenko (yellow card) 22'; N'Diaye (yellow card) 62'; Kendysh (yellow card) 62'	Stadium: Mikheil Meskhi Stadium; Referee: Pavel Orel (Czech Republic)
Note: Saburtalo Tbilisi played their home match at Mikheil Meskhi Stadium, Tbilisi, instead of their regular stadium Bandela Stadium, Tbilisi which does not meet UEFA requirements.

=== UEFA Europa League ===
==== Qualifying rounds ====
25 July 2019 Second qualifying round 1st leg	Partizani (Albania)	0–1	(Moldova) Sheriff Tiraspol	Tirana, Albania
18:30 EEST (UTC+3)	Ibrahimi (yellow card) 20'	Report	Tambe 24' (yellow card) 58'; N'Diaye (yellow card) 37'; Anton (yellow card) 47'; Balima (yellow card) 90+7'	Stadium: Selman Stërmasi Stadium; Attendance: 1,750; Referee: Kirill Levnikov (Russia)

1 August 2019 Second qualifying round 2nd leg	Sheriff Tiraspol (Moldova)	1–1 (2–1 agg.)	(Albania) Partizani	Tiraspol, Moldova
20:00 EEST (UTC+3)	Anton (yellow card) 9'; Mužek (yellow card) 53'; N'Diaye (yellow card) 61' (goal) 63'; Jach (yellow card) 87'; Balima (yellow card) 90+5'	Report	Solomon (yellow card) 28'; Asani 29'; Boldor (yellow card) 62'; Mala (yellow card) 65'; Broja (yellow card) 80'; Belica (yellow card) 90+2'	Stadium: Sheriff Stadium; Attendance: 5,248; Referee: Igor Pajač (Croatia)

8 August 2019 Third qualifying round 1st leg	Sheriff Tiraspol (Moldova)	1–2	(Sweden) AIK	Tiraspol, Moldova
20:00 EEST (UTC+3)	Kendysh 56' (pen.); Tambe (yellow card) 75'; Lukić (yellow card) 84'	Report	Lukić 12' (o.g.); Kolbeinn 14'; Dimitriadis (yellow card) 55'; Elyounoussi (yellow card) 57'	Stadium: Sheriff Stadium; Attendance: 6,341; Referee: Kevin Clancy (Scotland)

15 August 2019 Third qualifying round 2nd leg	AIK (Sweden)	1–1 (3–2 agg.)	(Moldova) Sheriff Tiraspol	Stockholm, Sweden
20:00 EEST (UTC+3)	Elyounoussi (yellow card) 57'; Bahoui 61'	Report	Mužek (yellow card) 27'; Kendysh (yellow card) 39'; Lukić (yellow card) 44'; Boban 86'	Stadium: Friends Arena; Referee: Roi Reinshreiber (Israel)

== Squad statistics ==
As of Match played 9 November 2019

=== Appearances and goals ===
No.	Pos	Nat	Player	Total		Divizia Națională		2018–19 Moldovan Cup		2019–20 Moldovan Cup		Super Cup		Champions League		Europa League	
No.	Pos	Nat	Player	Apps	Goals	Apps	Goals	Apps	Goals	Apps	Goals	Apps	Goals	Apps	Goals	Apps	Goals
1	GK	(Moldova) MDA	Dumitru Celeadnic	30	0	24	0	2	0	3	0	1	0	0	0	0	0
3	DF	(Croatia) CRO	Mateo Mužek	14	0	6+3	0	0	0	0	0	0	0	1	0	4	0
4	DF	(Slovenia) SLO	Matej Palčič	6	0	2	0	0	0	1	0	0	0	2	0	1	0
6	DF	(Moldova) MDA	Denis Macalici	1	0	0	0	0	0	1	0	0	0	0	0	0	0
7	MF	(Ukraine) UKR	Andriy Bliznichenko	5	3	3+2	3	0	0	0	0	0	0	0	0	0	0
8	MF	(Moldova) MDA	Mihail Ghecev	10	5	5+2	2	1	0	0+2	3	0	0	0	0	0	0
14	DF	(Burkina Faso) BFA	Wilfried Balima	22	3	9+4	3	1+1	0	0+1	0	1	0	0+1	0	3+1	0
15	DF	(Brazil) BRA	Cristiano	36	0	23+1	0	3	0	2	0	1	0	2	0	4	0
16	MF	(Poland) POL	Ariel Borysiuk	12	1	9+1	1	0	0	0	0	0	0	0	0	2	0
17	DF	(Moldova) MDA	Alexandr Belousov	28	1	21+1	1	1	0	3+1	0	0+1	0	0	0	0	0
18	MF	(Moldova) MDA	Gheorghe Anton	30	1	10+9	0	2	0	3	1	1	0	1+1	0	3	0
19	MF	(Croatia) CRO	Antun Palić	20	2	10+2	1	1+2	0	1	1	1	0	1+1	0	0+1	0
20	GK	(Croatia) CRO	Zvonimir Mikulić	12	0	4	0	1	0	1	0	0	0	2	0	4	0
22	DF	(Moldova) MDA	Vadim Dijinari	5	2	2+2	1	0	0	1	1	0	0	0	0	0	0
23	DF	(Ukraine) UKR	Artem Hordiyenko	14	1	3+3	0	0	0	2	1	0	0	2	0	2+2	0
24	FW	(Moldova) MDA	Evghenii Berco	3	0	0+1	0	1	0	0+1	0	0	0	0	0	0	0
27	MF	(Albania) ALB	Liridon Latifi	19	5	9+2	1	0	0	2	3	0	0	2	1	4	0
29	FW	(Cameroon) CMR	Robert Tambe	36	17	14+9	9	3	2	3	4	1	0	1+1	1	4	1
32	MF	(Moldova) MDA	Nichita Kholodov	2	0	2	0	0	0	0	0	0	0	0	0	0	0
44	DF	(Croatia) CRO	Andrej Lukić	15	3	9+2	3	0	0	1+1	0	0	0	0	0	2	0
70	FW	(Brazil) BRA	Leandro	30	9	12+9	4	1+2	1	2+2	4	1	0	0+1	0	0	0
76	FW	(Croatia) CRO	Gabrijel Boban	17	6	8	1	0	0	2+1	4	0	0	2	0	4	1
77	MF	(Belarus) BLR	Yury Kendysh	38	20	24+1	13	2+1	0	3	6	1	0	2	0	4	1
90	DF	(Moldova) MDA	Veaceslav Posmac	31	2	20+1	2	3	0	4	0	1	0	1	0	0+1	0
91	DF	(Senegal) SEN	Ousmane N'Diaye	20	2	12+1	0	0	0	3	1	0	0	1	0	3	1
98	DF	(Moldova) MDA	Maxim Cojocaru	32	5	18+5	4	2	1	2+1	0	1	0	0	0	0+3	0
Players away on loan :
4	DF	(Moldova) MDA	Artiom Rozgoniuc	2	0	1+1	0	0	0	0	0	0	0	0	0	0	0
Players who left Sheriff Tiraspol during the season:
6	DF	(Poland) POL	Jarosław Jach	23	1	14	0	1+1	0	1	1	0	0	1+1	0	0+4	0
10	MF	(Spain) ESP	José Ángel	18	3	7+6	2	2	0	1+1	1	0	0	1	0	0	0
9	FW	(Denmark) DEN	Patrick Pedersen	18	5	6+8	3	1+1	0	0+1	2	0+1	0	0	0	0	0
23	DF	(Serbia) SRB	Vladimir Kovačević	10	2	4+2	2	2+1	0	0	0	1	0	0	0	0	0
32	MF	(Moldova) MDA	Evgheni Oancea	13	3	9+1	3	2	0	0	0	0+1	0	0	0	0	0
55	DF	(Bosnia and Herzegovina) BIH	Mateo Sušić	12	1	9+1	1	2	0	0	0	0	0	0	0	0	0

=== Goal scorers ===
Place	Position	Nation	Number	Name	Divizia Națională	2018–19 Moldovan Cup	2019–20 Moldovan Cup	Super Cup	Champions League	Europa League	Total
1	MF	(Belarus)	77	Yury Kendysh	13	0	6	0	0	1	20
2	FW	(Cameroon)	29	Robert Tambe	9	2	4	0	1	1	17
3	FW	(Brazil)	70	Leandro	4	1	4	0	0	0	9
4	FW	(Croatia)	76	Gabrijel Boban	1	0	4	0	0	1	6
5	FW	(Denmark)	9	Patrick Pedersen	3	0	2	0	0	0	5
5	MF	(Moldova)	8	Mihail Ghecev	2	0	3	0	0	0	5
5	MF	(Albania)	27	Liridon Latifi	1	0	3	0	1	0	5
8	DF	(Moldova)	98	Maxim Cojocaru	4	0	0	0	0	0	4
9	MF	(Ukraine)	7	Andriy Bliznichenko	3	0	0	0	0	0	3
9	MF	(Moldova)	32	Evgheni Oancea	3	0	0	0	0	0	3
9	DF	(Burkina Faso)	14	Wilfried Balima	3	0	0	0	0	0	3
9	DF	(Croatia)	44	Andrej Lukić	3	0	0	0	0	0	3
9	MF	(Spain)	10	José Ángel	2	0	1	0	0	0	3
14	DF	(Serbia)	23	Vladimir Kovačević	2	0	0	0	0	0	2
14	DF	(Moldova)	90	Veaceslav Posmac	2	0	0	0	0	0	2
14	MF	(Croatia)	19	Antun Palić	1	0	1	0	0	0	2
14	DF	(Moldova)	22	Vadim Dijinari	1	0	1	0	0	0	2
14	DF	(Senegal)	91	Ousmane N'Diaye	0	0	1	0	0	1	2
14				Own goal	1	0	0	0	1	0	2
20	DF	(Moldova)	17	Alexandr Belousov	1	0	0	0	0	0	1
20	MF	(Poland)	16	Ariel Borysiuk	1	0	0	0	0	0	1
20	MF	(Moldova)	18	Gheorghe Anton	0	0	1	0	0	0	1
20	DF	(Poland)	6	Jarosław Jach	0	0	1	0	0	0	1
20	DF	(Ukraine)	23	Artem Hordiyenko	0	0	1	0	0	0	1
				TOTALS	60	3	33	0	3	4	103

=== Disciplinary record ===
Number	Nation	Position	Name	Divizia Națională		2018–19 Moldovan Cup		2019–20 Moldovan Cup		Super Cup		Champions League		Europa League		Total	
Number	Nation	Position	Name	Yellow card	Red card	Yellow card	Red card	Yellow card	Red card	Yellow card	Red card	Yellow card	Red card	Yellow card	Red card	Yellow card	Red card
1	(Moldova)	GK	Dumitru Celeadnic	1	0	0	0	0	0	0	0	0	0	0	0	1	0
3	(Croatia)	DF	Mateo Mužek	0	0	0	0	0	0	0	0	0	0	2	0	2	0
4	(Slovenia)	DF	Matej Palčič	0	0	0	0	0	0	0	0	2	1	0	0	2	1
6	(Moldova)	MF	Denis Macalici	0	0	0	0	1	0	0	0	0	0	0	0	1	0
8	(Moldova)	MF	Mihail Ghecev	4	0	1	0	0	0	0	0	0	0	0	0	5	0
14	(Burkina Faso)	DF	Wilfried Balima	0	0	0	0	0	0	0	0	0	0	2	0	2	0
15	(Brazil)	DF	Cristiano	1	0	1	0	0	0	1	0	0	0	0	0	3	0
16	(Poland)	MF	Ariel Borysiuk	1	0	0	0	0	0	0	0	0	0	0	0	1	0
17	(Moldova)	DF	Alexandr Belousov	2	0	0	0	0	0	0	0	0	0	0	0	2	0
18	(Moldova)	MF	Gheorghe Anton	3	0	1	0	0	0	0	0	0	0	2	0	6	0
19	(Croatia)	MF	Antun Palić	1	0	0	0	0	0	1	0	0	0	0	0	2	0
23	(Ukraine)	DF	Artem Hordiyenko	0	0	0	0	1	0	0	0	1	0	0	0	2	0
27	(Albania)	MF	Liridon Latifi	2	0	0	0	0	0	0	0	0	0	0	0	2	0
29	(Cameroon)	FW	Robert Tambe	2	0	0	0	0	0	0	0	0	0	2	0	4	0
44	(Croatia)	DF	Andrej Lukić	3	0	0	0	0	0	0	0	0	0	2	0	5	0
70	(Brazil)	FW	Leandro	2	0	0	0	0	0	0	0	0	0	0	0	2	0
76	(Croatia)	FW	Gabrijel Boban	1	0	0	0	0	0	0	0	0	0	0	0	1	0
77	(Belarus)	MF	Yury Kendysh	3	0	2	0	0	0	0	0	2	0	1	0	8	0
90	(Moldova)	DF	Veaceslav Posmac	2	0	1	0	1	0	0	0	0	0	0	0	4	0
91	(Senegal)	DF	Ousmane N'Diaye	2	0	0	0	0	0	0	0	1	0	2	0	5	0
98	(Moldova)	DF	Maxim Cojocaru	3	0	0	0	0	0	0	0	0	0	0	0	3	0
Players who left Sheriff Tiraspol during the season:
6	(Poland)	DF	Jarosław Jach	2	0	1	0	0	0	0	0	0	0	1	0	4	0
9	(Denmark)	FW	Patrick Pedersen	2	0	0	0	0	0	0	0	0	0	0	0	2	0
10	(Spain)	MF	José Ángel	1	0	0	0	0	0	0	0	0	0	0	0	1	0
55	(Bosnia and Herzegovina)	DF	Mateo Sušić	2	0	0	0	0	0	0	0	0	0	0	0	2	0
			TOTALS	39	0	7	0	3	0	2	0	6	1	12	0	71	1
