= 2019 Moldovan Super Cup =

Supercupa Moldovei
Sheriff Tiraspol	Milsami Orhei
0	0
- Milsami Orhei won 5–4 on penalties
- Date: 10 March 2019
- Venue: Sheriff Small Arena, Tiraspol
- Referee: Alexandru Tean
- Attendance: 3,000

The 2019 Moldovan Super Cup was the 11th Moldovan Super Cup (Romanian: Supercupa Moldovei), an annual Moldovan football match played by the winner of the national football league (the National Division) and the winner of the national Cup. The match was played between Sheriff Tiraspol, champions of the 2018 National Division, and Milsami Orhei, winners of the 2017–18 Moldovan Cup. It was held at the Sheriff Small Arena on 10 March 2019.

Milsami Orhei won 5–4 on penalties, after the match finished 0–0 after 90 minutes.

== Match ==
10 March 2019
16:00 EET

Sheriff Tiraspol	0–0	Milsami Orhei
Penalties
Oancea (penalty scored); Pedersen (penalty scored); Tambe (penalty scored); Anton (penalty scored); Cris Silva (penalty missed)	4–5	(penalty scored) Bolohan; (penalty scored) Crăciun; (penalty scored) Onica; (penalty scored) Andronic; (penalty scored) Mîțu

Sheriff Small Arena, Tiraspol
Attendance: 3,000
Referee: Alexandru Tean

Sheriff	Milsami

GK	1	(Moldova) Dumitru Celeadnic
DF	15	(Brazil) Cris Silva	(yellow card) 72'
DF	23	(Serbia) Vladimir Kovačević
DF	90	(Moldova) Veaceslav Posmac
DF	98	(Moldova) Maxim Cojocaru		(substituted off) 64'
MF	14	(Burkina Faso) Wilfried Balima
MF	18	(Moldova) Gheorghe Anton
MF	19	(Croatia) Antun Palić	(yellow card) 42'	(substituted off) 81'
MF	77	(Belarus) Yury Kendysh
FW	29	(Cameroon) Robert Tambe
FW	70	(Brazil) Leandro Ribeiro		(substituted off) 64'
Substitutes:
GK	20	(Croatia) Zvonimir Mikulić
DF	4	(Moldova) Artiom Rozgoniuc
DF	6	(Poland) Jarosław Jach
DF	55	(Bosnia and Herzegovina) Mateo Sušić
MF	17	(Moldova) Alexandr Belousov		(substituted on) 64'
MF	32	(Moldova) Evgheni Oancea		(substituted on) 81'
FW	9	(Denmark) Patrick Pedersen		(substituted on) 64'
Manager:
(Croatia) Goran Sablić

GK	1	(Moldova) Radu Mîțu
DF	2	(Moldova) Artur Crăciun
DF	4	(Moldova) Vasile Jardan
DF	22	(Moldova) Dinu Graur
DF	23	(Moldova) Vadim Bolohan
MF	7	(Moldova) Victor Stînă	(yellow card) 65'	(substituted off) 85'
MF	8	(Moldova) Artur Pătraș		(substituted off) 59'
MF	10	(Moldova) Gheorghe Andronic	(yellow card) 72'
MF	17	(Moldova) Andrei Rusnac	(yellow card) 62'
MF	24	(Moldova) Alexandru Onica	(yellow card) 75'
FW	13	(Moldova) Sergiu Plătică		(substituted off) 90+1'
Substitutions:
GK	50	(Moldova) Anatol Chirinciuc
DF	6	(Moldova) Constantin Bogdan
MF	19	(Moldova) Oleg Martin
MF	26	(Moldova) Veaceslav Zagaevschi		(substituted on) 90+1'
FW	9	(Moldova) Maxim Antoniuc	(yellow card) 86'	(substituted on) 85'
FW	11	(Moldova) Daniel Ciobanu
FW	15	(Moldova) Ion Ibrian		(substituted on) 59'
Manager:
(Moldova) Veaceslav Rusnac

Assistant referees:
Andrei Bodean
Vladislav Lifciu
Additional assistant referees:
Gabriel Tupicica
Viktor Bugenko
Fourth official:
Victor Mardari

Match rules

- 90 minutes.
- Penalty shoot-out if score is still level.
- Seven named substitutes, of which up to three may be used.
