= Vadim Paireli =

Moldovan footballer

Personal information
- Date of birth: 8 November 1995 (age 31)
- Place of birth: Tiraspol, Moldova
- Height: 1.78 m (5 ft 10 in)
- Position: Right winger

Team information
- Current team: Ulytau
- Number: 95

Youth career
- Sheriff Tiraspol

Senior career*
Years	Team	Apps	(Gls)
2013–2021	Sheriff Tiraspol	57	(6)
2016–2017	→ NK Dugopolje (loan)	28	(0)
2017–2018	→ Petrocub Hîncești (loan)	22	(6)
2018–2019	→ Sfîntul Gheorghe (loan)	18	(3)
2020–2021	→ Dinamo-Auto (loan)	20	(7)
2021	Noah	18	(4)
2022–2023	Sfîntul Gheorghe	30	(4)
2023–2024	Milsami Orhei	21	(1)
2024–2025	Sheriff Tiraspol	4	(0)
2025–	Ulytau	6	(0)

International career^{‡}
2012–2013	Moldova U19	5	(0)
2014–2016	Moldova U21	13	(1)
2017–2018	Moldova	5	(0)
- * Club domestic league appearances and goals as of 23 July 2025 ‡ National team caps and goals as of 27 March 2018

Vadim Paireli (born 8 November 1995) is a Moldovan footballer who plays as an attacking midfielder for Kazakhstan Premier League club Ulytau.

== Club career ==
On 28 January 2021, Paireli left Sheriff Tiraspol to sign for Armenian club FC Noah. Paireli left Noah on 24 December 2021 after his contract expired. He joined Sfîntul Gheorghe in February 2022.

On 27 June 2024, Sheriff Tiraspol announced the return of Paireli.

== International career ==
He was a member of the Moldova under-19 team and Moldova under-21 team. He made his debut for the senior squad on 9 October 2017 in a World Cup qualifier against Austria.

== Career statistics ==
=== Club ===
As of match played 11 May 2024

Appearances and goals by club, season and competition
Club	Season	League			National cup (Note: Includes Cupa Moldovei)		Continental		Other		Total	
Club	Season	Division	Apps	Goals	Apps	Goals	Apps	Goals	Apps	Goals	Apps	Goals
Sheriff Tiraspol	2012–13	Divizia Națională	2	0	0	0	0 (Note: Zero appearances in the UEFA Champions League and zero appearances in the UEFA Europa League.)	0	0 (Note: Appearances in the Supercupa Moldovei)	0	2	0
Sheriff Tiraspol	2013–14	Divizia Națională	27	2	4	0	2 (Note: Zero appearances in the UEFA Champions League and two appearances in the UEFA Europa League.)	0	0	0	33	2
Sheriff Tiraspol	2014–15	Divizia Națională	21	4	3	0	1 (Note: Zero appearances in the UEFA Champions League and one appearance in the UEFA Europa League.)	0	1	0	26	4
Sheriff Tiraspol	2015–16	Divizia Națională	5	0	0	0	0 (Note: Appearances in the UEFA Europa League)	0	0	0	5	0
Sheriff Tiraspol	2016–17	Divizia Națională	0	0	0	0	0 (Note: Appearances in the UEFA Champions League)	0	0	0	0	0
Sheriff Tiraspol	2017	Divizia Națională	0	0	0	0	0 (Note: Zero appearances in the UEFA Champions League and zero appearances in the UEFA Europa League.)	0	0	0	0	0
Sheriff Tiraspol	2018	Divizia Națională	0	0	0	0	0 (Note: Zero appearances in the UEFA Champions League and zero appearances in the UEFA Europa League.)	0	-		0	0
Sheriff Tiraspol	2019	Divizia Națională	0	0	0	0	0 (Note: Zero appearances in the UEFA Champions League and zero appearances in the UEFA Europa League.)	0	0	0	0	0
Sheriff Tiraspol	2020–21	Divizia Națională	0	0	2	0	0 (Note: Zero appearances in the UEFA Champions League and zero appearances in the UEFA Europa League.)	0	0	0	2	0
Sheriff Tiraspol	Total		55	6	9	0	3	0	1	0	68	6
Dugopolje (loan)	2016–17	Druga NL	28	0	0	0	—		—		28	0
Petrocub Hîncești (loan)	2017	Divizia Națională	16	5	0	0	—		—		16	5
Petrocub Hîncești (loan)	2018	Divizia Națională	6	1	2	0	—		—		8	1
Petrocub Hîncești (loan)	Total		22	6	2	0	-	-	-	-	24	6
Sfîntul Gheorghe (loan)	2018	Divizia Națională	13	3	1	0	—		—		14	3
Sfîntul Gheorghe (loan)	2019	Divizia Națională	5	0	2	0	—		—		7	0
Sfîntul Gheorghe (loan)	Total		18	3	3	0	-	-	-	-	21	3
Dinamo-Auto Tiraspol (loan)	2020–21	Divizia Națională	20	7	0	0	1	0	—		21	7
Noah	2020–21	Armenian Premier League	6	1	4	0	0	0	0 (Note: Appearances in the Armenian Supercup)	0	10	1
Noah	2021–22	Armenian Premier League	12	3	0	0	0 (Note: Appearances in the UEFA Europa Conference League)	0	-		12	3
Noah	Total		18	4	4	0	0	0	0	0	22	4
Sfîntul Gheorghe	2021–22	Divizia Națională	8	2	2	0	0	0	-		10	2
Sfîntul Gheorghe	2022–23	Moldovan Super Liga	22	2	4	0	2	0	-		28	2
Sfîntul Gheorghe	Total		30	4	6	0	0	0	0	0	22	4
Milsami Orhei	2023–24	Moldovan Super Liga	21	1	1	0	2	0	—		22	1
Career total			212	31	25	0	8	0	1	0	246	31
