= Alexandr Belousov =

Moldovan footballer

Personal information
- Full name: Alexandr Belousov
- Date of birth: 14 May 1998 (age 28)
- Place of birth: Tiraspol, Moldova
- Height: 1.80 m (5 ft 11 in)
- Position: Defender

Youth career
- –2017: Sheriff Tiraspol

Senior career*
Years	Team	Apps	(Gls)
2015–2017	Sheriff-2 Tiraspol	33	(0)
2018–2023	Sheriff Tiraspol	45	(2)
2020	→ Dinamo-Auto Tiraspol (loan)	16	(1)
2022	→ Sfîntul Gheorghe (loan)	1	(0)
2022	→ Milsami Orhei (loan)	13	(1)
2023	Spartak Varna	15	(0)

International career^{‡}
2014–2015	Moldova U17	4	(0)
2016	Moldova U19	5	(0)
2019–2020	Moldova U21	6	(2)
2020–	Moldova	5	(0)
- * Club domestic league appearances and goals as of 12:17, 7 February 2025 (UTC) ‡ National team caps and goals as of 22 November 2023

Alexandr Belousov (born 14 May 1998) is a Moldovan footballer who plays as a defender.

== Club career ==
Belousov made his professional debut for Sheriff Tiraspol in the Moldovan National Division on 24 June 2018, coming on as a 90th-minute substitute in the away match against Zimbru Chișinău, which finished as a 1–0 win.

He was loaned out to Dinamo-Auto Tiraspol for the first half of the 2020–21 season. On 5 March 2022, he was loaned out to Sfîntul Gheorghe for the rest of the 2021–22 season. In November 2022, Belousov signed a one-and-a-half-year contract with Bulgarian club Spartak Varna.

== International career ==
He made his debut for Moldova national football team on 18 November 2020 in a Nations League game against Kosovo. He substituted Dan Spătaru in the 85th minute.

== Personal life ==
Belousov is of Russian descent.

== Career statistics ==
=== Club ===
As of match played 17 February 2022

Appearances and goals by club, season and competition
Club	Season	League			National Cup		Continental		Other		Total	
Club	Season	Division	Apps	Goals	Apps	Goals	Apps	Goals	Apps	Goals	Apps	Goals
Sheriff-2 Tiraspol	2015–16	Divizia A	2	0	—		—		—		2	0
Sheriff-2 Tiraspol	2016–17	Divizia A	15	0	—		—		—		15	0
Sheriff-2 Tiraspol	2017	Divizia A	16	0	—		—		—		16	0
Sheriff-2 Tiraspol	Total		33	0	—		—		—		33	0
Sheriff Tiraspol	2018	Divizia Națională	10	1	2	2	0	0	—		12	3
Sheriff Tiraspol	2019	Divizia Națională	22	1	5	0	0	0	1 (Note: Appearance in Moldovan Super Cup.)	0	28	1
Sheriff Tiraspol	2020–21	Divizia Națională	10	0	2	0	0	0	—		12	0
Sheriff Tiraspol	2021–22	Divizia Națională	3	0	1	0	2	0	1	1	7	1
Sheriff Tiraspol	Total		45	2	10	2	2	0	2	1	59	5
Dinamo-Auto Tiraspol (loan)	2020–21	Divizia Națională	16	1	0	0	1	0	—		17	1
Career total			94	3	10	2	3	0	2	1	109	6

== Honours ==
Sheriff Tiraspol

- Moldovan National Division: 2018, 2019, 2020–21
- Moldovan Cup: 2018–19
