= 2017 Moldovan National Division =

Moldovan National Division
- Season: 2017
- Champions: Sheriff
- Champions League: Sheriff
- Europa League: Milsami; Petrocub Hîncești; Zaria Bălți
- Matches: 90
- Goals: 230 (2.56 per match)
- Biggest home win: Zaria 6–0 Dinamo-Auto
- Biggest away win: Dinamo-Auto 0–4 Sheriff; Spicul 0–4 Sheriff; Spicul 0–4 Petrocub
- Highest scoring: Sheriff 6–3 Dacia

The 2017 Moldovan National Division (Romanian: Divizia Națională) was the 27th season of top-tier football in Moldova. It was played as a double round-robin tournament. This transitional season was a result of the Moldovan Football Federation's decision to change the Divizia Națională season from an Autumn–Spring schedule to a Spring–Autumn one. Sheriff Tiraspol were the defending champions. The competition began on 8 July 2017.

== Stadia and locations ==
Location of teams in 2017 Moldovan National Division

Club	Location	Stadium	Capacity
Dacia	Chișinău	Stadionul Moldova (Speia)	8,550
Dinamo-Auto	Tiraspol	Dinamo-Auto Stadium	1,300
Milsami	Orhei	CSR Orhei	2,539
Petrocub-Hîncești	Sărata-Galbenă	Stadionul Orășenesc Hîncești	1,500
Sfîntul Gheorghe	Suruceni	Suruceni Stadium	1,500
Sheriff	Tiraspol	Sheriff Stadium	12,746
Speranța	Nisporeni	Stadionul Orășenesc Hîncești	1,500
Spicul	Chișcăreni	CSR Orhei	2,539
Zaria	Bălți	Stadionul Orășenesc Bălți	5,953
Zimbru	Chișinău	Zimbru Stadium	10,400

=== Personnel and sponsorship ===
Team	Head coach	Captain	Kit manufacturer	Shirt sponsor
Dacia	(Moldova) Viorel Frunză	(Moldova) Alexandru Pașcenco	Joma	OM
Dinamo-Auto	(Moldova) Iurie Groșev	(Moldova) Dumitru Popovici	Joma	-
Milsami	(Moldova) Veaceslav Rusnac	(Moldova) Andrei Cojocari	Kelme	Dufremol
Petrocub-Hîncești	(Moldova) Lilian Popescu	(Moldova) Vladimir Ambros	Joma	MAIB
Sfîntul Gheorghe	(Moldova) Serghei Secu	n/a	Macron	-
Sheriff	(Italy) Roberto Bordin	(Bosnia and Herzegovina) Mateo Sušić	Adidas	IDC
Speranța	(Moldova) Cristian Efros	(Moldova) Stefan Efros	Nike	Orom-Imexpo
Spicul	(Moldova) Denis Calincov	(Moldova) Petru Ojog	Joma	Salamander
Zaria	(Romania) Stefan Stoica	(Moldova) Alexandru Onica	Joma	Bălți
Zimbru	(Moldova) Iurie Osipenco	(Moldova) Denis Rusu	Joma	-

== Managerial changes ==
Team	Outgoing manager	Manner of departure	Vacancy	Position	Incoming manager	Appointment
Milsami	(Moldova) Adrian Sosnovschi	Mutual consent	5 June 2016	preseason	(Moldova) Veaceslav Rusnac	5 June 2017
Petrocub-Hîncești	(Moldova) Iurie Osipenco	Mutual consent	6 June 2017	preseason	(Moldova) Lilian Popescu	6 June 2017
Zimbru	(Romania) Ștefan Stoica	Sacked	11 July 2017	8th	(Moldova) Iurie Osipenco	16 July 2017
Sfîntul Gheorghe	(Moldova) Vadim Boreț	Sacked	24 July 2017	10th	(Moldova) Serghei Secu	24 July 2017
Zaria	(Moldova) Vlad Goian	Sacked	26 August 2017	9th	(Romania) Ștefan Stoica	28 August 2017

== League table ==
Pos	Team	Pld	W	D	L	GF	GA	GD	Pts	Qualification or relegation
1	Sheriff Tiraspol (C)	18	14	3	1	50	14	+36	45	Qualification for the Champions League first qualifying round
2	Milsami Orhei	18	13	1	4	26	12	+14	40	Qualification for the Europa League first qualifying round (Note: Since the winner of the 2017–18 Moldovan Cup (Milsami) qualified for European competition based on their league position, the spot awarded to the Cup winner (Europa League first qualifying round) was passed to the next best-placed team (in this case to the fifth-placed team).)
3	Petrocub-Hîncești	18	7	5	6	25	16	+9	26 (Note: Petrocub ahead of Dacia on head-to-head points: Petrocub–Dacia 3–0, Dacia–Petrocub 0–2)	Qualification for the Europa League first qualifying round
4	Dacia Chișinău	18	7	5	6	23	26	−3	26	withdrew (Note: Dacia Chișinău completed the season but withdrew from the league prior to the start of the next season.)
5	Zaria Bălți	18	7	3	8	28	20	+8	24	Qualification for the Europa League first qualifying round
6	Speranța Nisporeni	18	5	6	7	18	21	−3	21	
7	Sfîntul Gheorghe	18	5	5	8	15	27	−12	20	
8	Zimbru Chișinău	18	5	4	9	17	21	−4	19	
9	Dinamo-Auto Tiraspol	18	4	3	11	14	38	−24	15	
10	Spicul Chișcăreni	18	3	5	10	14	35	−21	14	withdrew (Note: As per regulations, the tenth placed team Spicul Chișcăreni was to be relegated to Divizia A, but the club withdrew before the start of the next season.)

Source: FMF, Soccerway
Rules for classification: 1) Points; 2) Play-off (only if deciding champion when two teams tied); 3) Head-to-head points; 4) Head-to-head goal difference; 5) Head-to-head away goals scored; 6) Head-to-head goals scored; 7) Matches won; 8) Goal difference; 9) Goals scored; 10) Less yellow cards; 11) Less red cards.
(C) Champions

== Results ==
The schedule consists of two rounds, each team plays each other once home-and-away for a total of 18 matches per team.

Home \ Away	DAC	DIN	MIL	PET	SFÎ	SHE	SPE	SPI	ZAR	ZIM
Dacia Chișinău	—	4–1	1–1	0–2	1–0	1–1	2–1	2–2	1–1	2–1
Dinamo-Auto Tiraspol	3–2	—	1–4	1–0	2–2	0–4	0–3	0–3	1–0	1–0
Milsami Orhei	2–1	2–1	—	1–0	1–0	0–2	0–1	2–0	1–0	1–0
Petrocub-Hîncești	3–0	1–0	1–0	—	1–2	1–2	1–1	0–1	1–1	4–1
Sfîntul Gheorghe	0–1	1–0	0–3	0–2	—	0–3	2–1	4–3	2–1	0–0
Sheriff Tiraspol	6–3	3–1	3–1	3–1	1–1	—	0–1	5–0	5–0	2–2
Speranța Nisporeni	0–0	1–1	1–3	0–0	0–0	1–2	—	2–0	2–4	1–0
Spicul Chișcăreni	0–1	1–1	0–2	0–4	1–1	0–4	1–1	—	0–2	1–0
Zaria Bălți	0–1	6–0	0–1	2–2	2–0	0–2	3–0	3–0	—	3–0
Zimbru Chișinău	2–0	1–0	0–1	1–1	4–0	1–2	2–1	1–1	1–0	—

Source: Moldovan Football Federation (in Romanian)
Legend: Blue = home team win; Yellow = draw; Red = away team win.

== Top goalscorers ==
Rank	Player	Club	Goals
1	(Moldova) Vitalie Damașcan	Sheriff	13
2	(Moldova) Vladimir Ambros	Petrocub-Hîncești	9
3	(Montenegro) Stefan Mugoša	Sheriff	7
4	(Croatia) Josip Brezovec	Sheriff	5
4	(Ukraine) Serhiy Zahynaylov	Zaria	5
4	(Brazil) Jairo	Sheriff	5
4	(Moldova) Vadim Paireli	Petrocub-Hîncești	5
4	(Moldova) Viorel Primac	Speranța	5
4	(Brazil) Jean Theodoro	Zimbru	5
10	(Cameroon) Marius Obekop	Zaria	4
10	(Brazil) Douglas	Zimbru	4
10	(Moldova) Evgheni Oancea	Sheriff	4
10	(Moldova) Maxim Mihaliov	Zaria	4
10	(Moldova) Veaceslav Sofroni	Spicul	4
10	(Serbia) Bratislav Punoševac	Dacia	4
10	(Moldova) Sergiu Plătică	Speranța	4
10	(Moldova) Alexandru Dedov	Milsami	4
10	(Moldova) Alexandru Pașcenco	Dacia	4
10	(Moldova) Constantin Bogdan	Milsami	4

== Hat-tricks ==
Player	Home	Away	Result	Date
(Moldova) Victor Stînă	Zimbru	Sfîntul Gheorghe	4–0	15 July 2017
(Moldova) Vitalie Damașcan	Sheriff	Dinamo-Auto	3–1	5 August 2017
(Montenegro) Stefan Mugoša	Sheriff	Spicul	5–0	20 August 2017
(Brazil) Jairo	Sheriff	Dacia	6–3	23 September 2017
(Croatia) Josip Brezovec	Sheriff	Dacia	6–3	23 September 2017

== Clean sheets ==
Rank	Player	Club	Clean sheets
1	(Moldova) Radu Mîțu	Milsami	8
2	(Moldova) Dumitru Celeadnic	Petrocub-Hîncești	7
3	(Croatia) Zvonimir Mikulić	Sheriff	6
3	(Moldova) Serghei Pașcenco	Zaria	6
5	(Moldova) Nicolae Țurcan	Speranța	5
6	(Moldova) Dorian Railean	Sf. Gheorghe (3) & Dacia (1)	4
7	(Bulgaria) Georgi Georgiev	Dacia	3
7	(Moldova) Ilie Cebanu	Zimbru	3
7	(Moldova) Ion Rîmbu	Spicul	3
10	(Moldova) Ghenadie Moșneaga	Dinamo-Auto	2

== Attendance ==
Pos	Team	Played	Total	High	Low	Average
1	Zaria Bălți	9	13,900	3,000	500	1,544
2	Sheriff Tiraspol	9	12,100	2,000	700	1,344
3	Milsami Orhei	9	9,100	1,500	700	1,011
4	Zimbru Chișinău	9	8,100	2,000	300	900
5	Petrocub-Hîncești	9	6,400	1,000	300	711
6	Speranța Nisporeni	9	4,000	800	200	444
7	Spicul Chișcăreni	9	2,950	500	200	328
8	Sfîntul Gheorghe	9	2,900	700	100	322
9	Dacia Chișinău	9	1,930	800	50	214
10	Dinamo-Auto Tiraspol	9	1,250	200	100	139
	League total	90	62,630	3,000	50	696
