= Veaceslav Posmac =

Moldovan footballer (born 1990)

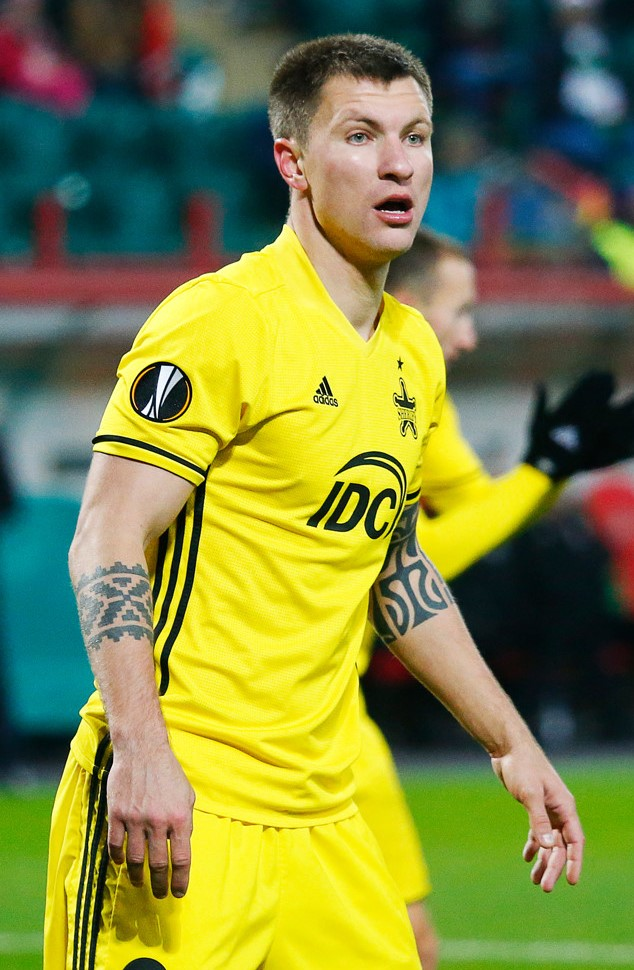
- Posmac with Sheriff Tiraspol in 2017

Personal information
- Date of birth: 7 November 1990 (age 36)
- Place of birth: Vulcănești, SSR Moldova, Soviet Union
- Height: 1.92 m (6 ft 4 in)
- Position: Centre-back

Team information
- Current team: Milsami Orhei
- Number: 2

Senior career*
Years	Team	Apps	(Gls)
2009–2012	Sfântul Gheorghe	96	(5)
2012–2017	Dacia Chișinău	128	(9)
2017–2021	Sheriff Tiraspol	85	(6)
2021–2022	Tuzlaspor	33	(1)
2022	Zimbru Chișinău	1	(0)
2022–2025	Boluspor	57	(7)
2025	Petrocub Hîncești	8	(1)
2025–	Milsami Orhei	11	(1)

International career^{‡}
2013–2025	Moldova	74	(2)
- * Club domestic league appearances and goals as of 1 June 2026 ‡ National team caps and goals as of 6 June 2025

Veaceslav Posmac (born 7 November 1990) is a Moldovan professional footballer who plays as a centre-back for Moldovan Liga club Milsami Orhei. He has made 74 caps for the Moldova national team.

== Club career ==
In June 2017, Posmac moved to FC Sheriff Tiraspol. He made his league debut for the club on 9 July 2017 in a 5–0 home victory over FC Zaria Bălți. This game also marked his first league goal for the club, which was scored in the 72nd minute. In January 2019, Posmac was voted FC Sheriff Fan's Player of the Season. On 12 July 2021, he signed for TFF First League club Tuzlaspor.

== International career ==
Posmac made his senior international debut on 14 June 2013 in a 2–1 friendly victory over Kyrgyzstan.

== Career statistics ==
=== International ===
As of 9 June 2025

Appearances and goals by national team and year
National team	Year	Apps	Goals
Moldova	2013	1	0
Moldova	2014	9	1
Moldova	2015	2	0
Moldova	2016	2	0
Moldova	2017	7	1
Moldova	2018	10	0
Moldova	2019	6	0
Moldova	2020	5	0
Moldova	2021	9	0
Moldova	2022	8	0
Moldova	2023	9	0
Moldova	2024	4	0
Moldova	2025	2	0
Total		74	2

Scores and results list Moldova's goal tally first.

List of international goals scored by Veaceslav Posmac
No.	Date	Venue	Opponent	Score	Result	Competition
1	15 January 2014	Zayed Sports City Stadium, Abu Dhabi, United Arab Emirates	Norway	1–0	1–2	Friendly
2	19 March 2017	San Marino Stadium, Serravalle, San Marino	San Marino	1–0	2–0	Friendly

== Honours ==
Sheriff Tiraspol

- Moldovan National Division: 2017, 2018, 2019, 2020–21
- Moldovan Cup: 2018–19
