= Andrei Bursuc =

Moldovan football midfielder

Personal information
- Full name: Andrei Bursuc
- Date of birth: 23 May 1997 (age 29)
- Place of birth: Chișinău, Moldova
- Height: 1.75 m (5 ft 9 in)
- Position: Midfielder

Team information
- Current team: Dinamo-Auto
- Number: 14

Youth career
- Dacia-2 Buiucani

Senior career*
Years	Team	Apps	(Gls)
2012–2013	Sfîntul Gheorghe	25	(2)
2014–2015	Dacia-2 Buiucani	12	(4)
2015–2017	Dacia Chișinău	21	(2)
2017	→ Dinamo-Auto (loan)	13	(2)
2017	→ Dinamo-Auto (loan)	8	(1)
2018	Kauno Žalgiris	5	(0)
2019	Codru Lozova	12	(3)
2019	Zimbru Chișinău	9	(0)
2020–2021	Speranța Nisporeni	28	(2)
2021–2022	Bălți	14	(0)
2022–	Dinamo-Auto	0	(0)
- * Club domestic league appearances and goals as of 20:09, 8 April 2022 (UTC)

Andrei Bursuc (born 23 May 1997) is a Moldovan footballer who plays as a midfielder for Dinamo-Auto in the Moldovan National Division.

His father Iulian Bursuc is a former professional footballer. They played alongside each other in Sfântul Gheorghe in 2013.
