= Maxim Cojocaru =

Moldovan footballer (born 1998)

Personal information
- Date of birth: 13 January 1998 (age 28)
- Place of birth: Cahul, Moldova
- Height: 1.75 m (5 ft 9 in)
- Position: Winger

Team information
- Current team: Petrocub Hîncești
- Number: 13

Youth career
- –2015: Dacia Chișinău

Senior career*
Years	Team	Apps	(Gls)
2015–2018	Dacia Chișinău	56	(7)
2018	Ventspils	6	(0)
2018	Petrocub Hîncești	12	(0)
2019–2022	Sheriff Tiraspol	29	(5)
2022–2023	Petrocub Hîncești	28	(5)
2023–2024	Chindia Târgoviște	20	(0)
2024–2025	Oțelul Galați	19	(0)
2025–	Petrocub Hîncești	25	(4)

International career^{‡}
2014–2015	Moldova U17	6	(1)
2016–2017	Moldova U19	17	(0)
2017–2019	Moldova U21	12	(1)
2019–	Moldova	32	(1)
- * Club domestic league appearances and goals as of 1 June 2026 ‡ National team caps and goals as of 9 September 2025

Maxim Cojocaru (born 13 January 1998) is a Moldovan professional footballer who plays as a winger for Moldovan Liga club Petrocub Hîncești and the Moldova national team.

== Club career ==
In February 2018, Cojocaru moved from Dacia Chișinău to Latvian club Ventspils. On 6 July 2018, he signed for Petrocub Hîncești. On 18 January 2019, he signed for Sheriff Tiraspol. On 8 March 2022, he returned to Petrocub Hîncești.

== International career ==
He made his Moldova national football team debut on 7 September 2019 in a Euro 2020 qualifier against Iceland, when he substituted Vadim Cemîrtan in the 65th minute.

=== International stats ===
As of match played 6 June 2025

Appearances and goals by national team and year
National team	Year	Apps	Goals
Moldova	2019	1	0
Moldova	2020	0	0
Moldova	2021	2	0
Moldova	2022	7	0
Moldova	2023	9	0
Moldova	2024	8	1
Moldova	2025	5	0
Total		32	1

=== International goals ===
Scores and results list Moldova's goal tally first.

No	Date	Venue	Opponent	Score	Result	Competition
1.	10 October 2024	Zimbru Stadium, Chișinău, Moldova	Andorra	2–0	2–0	2024–25 UEFA Nations League D

== Honours ==
Sheriff Tiraspol

- Divizia Națională: 2019, 2020–21
- Cupa Moldovei: 2018–19, 2021–22
- Supercupa Moldovei runner-up: 2019, 2021
