= Artur Crăciun =

Moldovan footballer (born 1998)

Personal information
- Date of birth: 29 June 1998 (age 28)
- Place of birth: Chișinău, Moldova
- Height: 1.93 m (6 ft 4 in)
- Position: Centre-back

Team information
- Current team: ŁKS Łódź
- Number: 22

Youth career
- Zimbru Chișinău

Senior career*
Years	Team	Apps	(Gls)
2015–2017	Zimbru-2 Chișinău	35	(3)
2016–2017	Zimbru Chișinău	11	(0)
2017	Sheriff-2 Tiraspol	10	(1)
2017–2018	Sheriff Tiraspol	0	(0)
2017	→ Milsami Orhei (loan)	15	(0)
2018–2019	Milsami Orhei	38	(2)
2019–2020	Universitatea Cluj	18	(2)
2020–2022	Budapest Honvéd	2	(0)
2021	→ Viitorul Constanța (loan)	0	(0)
2021	→ Sfîntul Gheorghe (loan)	8	(0)
2021–2022	→ Lokomotiv Plovdiv (loan)	13	(0)
2022	→ Tsarsko Selo (loan)	6	(0)
2022–2023	Hapoel Kfar Saba	31	(0)
2023–2025	Puszcza Niepołomice	58	(12)
2025–	ŁKS Łódź	33	(6)

International career^{‡}
2016	Moldova U19 (Note: Only official UEFA matches included)	3	(0)
2017–2020	Moldova U21	11	(1)
2019–	Moldova	38	(0)
- * Club domestic league appearances and goals as of 15:45, 29 May 2026 (UTC) ‡ National team caps and goals as of 10:35, 14 November 2025 (UTC)

Artur Crăciun (born 29 June 1998) is a Moldovan professional footballer who plays as a centre-back for Polish I liga club ŁKS Łódź and the Moldova national team.

== Club career ==
Crăciun made his professional debut for Zimbru in the Divizia Națională on 20 May 2016 against Academia Chișinău, coming on as a 92nd-minute substitute.

On 23 July 2019 he signed a contract with Romanian Liga II side Universitatea Cluj.

On 10 March 2021, he was loaned out to Sfântul Gheorghe from Budapest Honvéd.

In June 2022, he moved to Hapoel Kfar Saba.

On 10 July 2023, Crăciun signed a one-year contract, with an option to extend, with Polish Ekstraklasa newcomers Puszcza Niepołomice. On 23 July, he made his debut in Puszcza's first-ever top-tier outing, a 3–2 away loss to Widzew Łódź. He regularly appeared in the line-ups thereafter, contributing to Puszcza's bid for top-flight survival by scoring game-winning goals in home games against Widzew on 11 December, and Lech Poznań on 13 April 2024; he also became the designated penalty taker. On 10 May, Puszcza exercised their option to prolong Crăciun's contract for another twelve months.

On 20 June 2025, Crăciun moved to Polish second division club ŁKS Łódź, signing a two-year deal with an option for a further year.

== International career ==
He made his debut for Moldova national team on 14 November 2019 in a Euro 2020 qualifier against France. He started the game and played the whole match.

== Career statistics ==
=== International ===
As of match played 13 November 2025

Appearances and goals by national team and year
National team	Year	Apps	Goals
Moldova
Moldova	2019	2	0
Moldova	2020	2	0
Moldova	2022	8	0
Moldova	2023	10	0
Moldova	2024	9	0
Moldova	2025	7	0
Total		38	0

== Honours ==
Milsami Orhei

- Moldovan Cup: 2017–18
- Moldovan Super Cup: 2019

Sfîntul Gheorghe

- Moldovan Cup: 2020–21
