= Mihail Ghecev =

Moldovan footballer

Personal information
- Date of birth: 5 November 1997 (age 29)
- Place of birth: Leova, Moldova
- Height: 1.78 m (5 ft 10 in)
- Position: Midfielder

Senior career*
Years	Team	Apps	(Gls)
2017–2019	Sfântul Gheorghe	27	(1)
2018	→ Petrocub Hîncești (loan)	9	(1)
2019–2021	Sheriff Tiraspol	7	(2)
2020	→ Sfântul Gheorghe (loan)	12	(2)
2021	Noah Jūrmala	0	(0)
2021	Sfântul Gheorghe	9	(4)
2021–2022	Veres Rivne	11	(0)
2022	→ Sfîntul Gheorghe (loan)	6	(0)
2022	Zimbru Chișinău	8	(1)
2023	Mynai	28	(1)
2024	Sheriff Tiraspol	10	(0)

International career^{‡}
2019–	Moldova	4	(0)
- * Club domestic league appearances and goals as of 7 February 2025 ‡ National team caps and goals as of 23 August 2024

Mihail Ghecev (born 5 November 1997) is a Moldovan footballer who plays as a midfielder, most recently for Moldovan Super Liga club Sheriff Tiraspol.

== Career ==
Ghecev made his professional debut for Sfântul Gheorghe in the Moldovan National Division on 9 July 2017, with the match against Dacia Chișinău finishing as a 0–1 loss.

In January 2023 he moved to Mynai.

== International ==
He made his Moldova national football team debut on 10 September 2019 in a Euro 2020 qualifier against Turkey. He substituted Artur Ioniță in the 81st minute.
