= Petru Costin =

Moldovan football defender

Personal information
- Full name: Petru Costin
- Date of birth: 8 July 1997 (age 29)
- Place of birth: Chișinău, Moldova
- Height: 1.75 m (5 ft 9 in)
- Position: Defender

Team information
- Current team: Digenis Akritas
- Number: 30

Senior career*
| Years | Team | Apps | (Gls) |
| 2016–2017 | Dacia Chișinău | 3 | (0) |
| 2017 | → Academia Chișinău (loan) | 13 | (0) |
| 2017 | → Dinamo-Auto (loan) | 9 | (0) |
| 2019 | Codru Lozova | 17 | (0) |
| 2020–2022 | Bălți | 18 | (0) |
| 2023–2025 | Digenis Akritas | 52 | (3) |
| 2025 | FC Stăuceni | | |
| 2026– | Digenis Akritas | 16 | |

International career
| 2015 | Moldova U19 | 2 | (0) |
- * Club domestic league appearances and goals as of 3 May 2026

Petru Costin (born 8 July 1997), is a Moldovan football defender who plays for Cypriot side Digenis Akritas.
