= Evgheni Oancea =

Moldovan footballer

Personal information
- Date of birth: 5 January 1996 (age 30)
- Place of birth: Tiraspol, Moldova
- Height: 1.77 m (5 ft 10 in)
- Position: Central midfielder

Youth career
- 2013–2016: Sheriff Tiraspol

Senior career*
Years	Team	Apps	(Gls)
2016–2019	Sheriff Tiraspol	62	(14)
2019	Torpedo Minsk	0	(0)
2019–2021	SKA-Khabarovsk	22	(0)
2021	Sfîntul Gheorghe	10	(0)
2022	Noah	16	(1)
2022	Concordia Chiajna	3	(1)
2023	Milsami Orhei	7	(0)
2023	Florești	8	(0)
2024	Ravshan Kulob	2	(0)

International career
2012–2013	Moldova U17	1	(0)
2013–2014	Moldova U19	4	(1)
2017–2018	Moldova U21	8	(1)
- * Club domestic league appearances and goals as of 22 July 2024

Evgheni Oancea (born 5 January 1996) is a Moldovan professional footballer who plays as a midfielder, most recently for Ravshan Kulob.

== Career ==
Born in Tiraspol, Oancea started his career with Sheriff Tiraspol. He left the club in June 2019.

On 3 August 2019, he moved to Belarusian Premier League side Torpedo Minsk. He only made one appearance before the club was withdrawn from the league.

On 16 August 2019, he signed for Russian Football National League club SKA-Khabarovsk. He left the club in May 2021.

In September 2021, he moved to Moldovan National Division side Sfîntul Gheorghe.

In February 2022, he signed for Armenian Premier League club Noah. He left the club in May 2022.

In August 2022, he joined Romanian Liga II club Concordia Chiajna.

On 5 March 2024, Ravshan Kulob announced the signing of Oancea on a one-year contract. On 4 May 2024, Ravshan announced the departure of Oancea.

== Career statistics ==
As of match played 2 October 2022

Appearances and goals by club, season and competition
Club	Season	League			Cup		Europe		Other		Total	
Club	Season	Division	Apps	Goals	Apps	Goals	Apps	Goals	Apps	Goals	Apps	Goals
Sheriff Tiraspol	2015–16	Moldovan National Division	0	0	1	0	0	0	0 (Note: Appearance(s) in Moldovan Super Cup.)	0	1	0
Sheriff Tiraspol	2016–17	Moldovan National Division	13	2	0	0	1	0	0	0	14	2
Sheriff Tiraspol	2017	Moldovan National Division	16	4	0	0	0	0	—		16	4
Sheriff Tiraspol	2018	Moldovan National Division	23	5	2	0	2	0	—		27	5
Sheriff Tiraspol	2019	Moldovan National Division	10	3	2	0	0	0	1	0	13	3
Sheriff Tiraspol	Total		62	14	5	0	3	0	1	0	71	14
Torpedo Minsk	2019	Belarusian Premier League	0	0	1	0	—		—		1	0
SKA-Khabarovsk	2019–20	FNL	12	0	2	0	—		—		14	0
SKA-Khabarovsk	2020–21	FNL	10	0	0	0	—		—		10	0
SKA-Khabarovsk	Total		22	0	2	0	—		—		24	0
Sfîntul Gheorghe	2021–22	Moldovan National Division	10	0	0	0	—		—		10	0
Noah	2021–22	Armenian Premier League	16	1	0	0	—		—		16	1
Concordia Chiajna	2022–23	Liga II	1	1	0	0	—		—		1	1
Career Total			111	16	8	0	3	0	1	0	123	16

== Honours ==
Sheriff Tiraspol

- Moldovan National Division: 2015–16, 2016–17, 2017, 2018
- Moldovan Cup: 2014–15, 2016–17, 2018–19
- Moldovan Super Cup: 2015, 2016
