= Leandro Ribeiro =

Brazilian footballer (born 1995)

- Leandro with Incheon United in 2026

Personal information
- Full name: Leandro Joaquim Ribeiro
- Date of birth: 13 January 1995 (age 31)
- Place of birth: Rio de Janeiro, Brazil
- Height: 1.78 m (5 ft 10 in)
- Position: Striker

Team information
- Current team: Incheon United FC
- Number: 70

Youth career
- 2013–2014: Internacional

Senior career*
Years	Team	Apps	(Gls)
2014–2016	Internacional	7	(0)
2015–2016	→ Arouca (loan)	5	(0)
2016	→ Glória (loan)	10	(0)
2016	→ Vila Nova (loan)	4	(0)
2017–2018	Dila Gori	51	(18)
2017–2018	→ Maccabi Netanya (loan)	11	(0)
2019	Sheriff Tiraspol	21	(4)
2020	→ Seoul E-Land (loan)	11	(5)
2020–2021	Seoul E-Land	49	(8)
2022–2024	Daejeon Hana Citizen	72	(13)
2025	Jeonnam Dragons	9	(0)
2025	Seongnam FC	21	(0)
2026	Uthai Thani	10	(0)
2026–	Incheon United	7	(0)
- * Club domestic league appearances and goals as of 6 June 2026

Leandro Joaquim Ribeiro (born 13 January 1995) is a Brazilian footballer who plays as a striker for Incheon United FC of K League 1.

== Club career ==
Leandro Ribeiro is a youth product from Sport Club Internacional. He made his Série A debut at 29 May 2014 against Chapecoence.

In January 2017, Leandro Ribeiro signed for Dila Gori on a contract until the end of the 2017 season.

On 14 July 2017, Leandro Ribeiro was loaned to Maccabi Netanya for one season with option for three years.

Sheriff Tiraspol announced the signing of Leandro Ribeiro on 21 December 2018, with Leandro leaving the club at the end of the 2019 season after winning the 2019 Moldovan National Division and 2018–19 Moldovan Cup.

On 10 January 2020, Leandro was loaned to Seoul E-Land FC of K League 2. However, in July 2020, he made a three-and-a-half-year contract with the team.

In 2022, Leandro Ribeiro moved to Daejeon Hana Citizen of K League 2.

== Career statistics ==
As of 2 December 2023.

Club	Season	League			State League		Cup		League Cup		Continental		Other		Total	
Club	Season	Division	Apps	Goals	Apps	Goals	Apps	Goals	Apps	Goals	Apps	Goals	Apps	Goals	Apps	Goals
Internacional	2014	Série A	5	0	—		—		—		2	0	—		7	0
Arouca (loan)	2015–16	Primeira Liga	5	0	—		1	0	1	0	—		—		7	0
Glória (loan)	2016	—			10	0	—		—		—		—		10	0
Vila Nova (loan)	2016	Série B	4	0	—		—		—		—		—		4	0
Dila Gori	2017	Erovnuli Liga	18	4	—		2	1	—		—		—		20	5
Dila Gori	2018	Erovnuli Liga	33	14	—		2	0	—		—		—		35	14
Dila Gori	Total		51	18	—		4	1	—		—		—		55	19
Maccabi Netanya (loan)	2017–18	Israeli Premier League	10	0	—		1	0	—		—		—		11	0
Sheriff Tiraspol	2022	Moldovan National Division	21	4	—		5	2	—		1	0	1	0	28	6
Seoul E-Land (loan)	2020	K League 2	11	5	—		1	0	—		—		—		12	5
Seoul E-Land	2020	K League 2	15	5	—		0	0	—		—		—		15	5
Seoul E-Land	2021	K League 2	35	3	—		1	1	—		—		—		36	4
Seoul E-Land	Total		61	13	—		2	1	—		—		—		63	24
Daejeon Hana Citizen	2022	K League 2	35	9	—		1	0	—		—		—		36	9
Daejeon Hana Citizen	2023	K League 1	24	2	—		1	1	—		—		—		25	3
Daejeon Hana Citizen	Total		59	11	—		2	1	—		—		—		61	12
Career total			216	46	10	0	15	5	1	0	3	0	1	0	246	51

== Honours ==
Sheriff Tiraspol

- Divizia Națională: 2019
- Moldovan Cup: 2018–19
