= Nicolae Țurcan =

Moldovan footballer

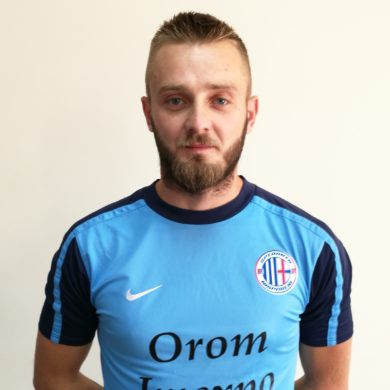

Personal information
- Full name: Nicolai Țurcan
- Date of birth: 9 December 1989 (age 36)
- Place of birth: Moldova
- Height: 1.87 m (6 ft 2 in)
- Position: Goalkeeper

Team information
- Current team: Codru Lozova
- Number: 21

Senior career*
Years	Team	Apps	(Gls)
2009–2010	MVD Rossii	11	(0)
2011–2012	Astra II Giurgiu	2	(0)
2015–2017	Speranța Nisporeni	40	(0)
2017	Sfântul Gheorghe	5	(0)
2017–2018	Speranța Nisporeni	8	(0)
2018–2019	FC UTA Arad	3	(0)
2019–	Codru Lozova	5	(0)
- * Club domestic league appearances and goals as of 19:25, 13 May 2019 (UTC)

Nicolae Țurcan (born 9 December 1989) is a Moldovan footballer who plays as a goalkeeper for FC Codru Lozova.
