= Ousmane N'Diaye (footballer) =

Senegalese footballer (born 1991)

Personal information
- Full name: Ousmane Cardinal N'Diaye
- Date of birth: 19 August 1991 (age 35)
- Place of birth: Dakar, Senegal
- Height: 1.86 m (6 ft 1 in)
- Position: Centre-back

Team information
- Current team: Sainte-Geneviève

Youth career
- Lyon

Senior career*
Years	Team	Apps	(Gls)
2008–2011	Lyon B	70	(2)
2011–2015	Arles-Avignon	100	(1)
2013–2015	Arles-Avignon B	7	(0)
2015–2017	Samsunspor	59	(2)
2017–2018	Gençlerbirliği	10	(0)
2018–2019	Osmanlıspor	16	(0)
2019–2021	Sheriff Tiraspol	22	(1)
2021	Kaisar	18	(0)
2022–2023	Mohammedan	19	(0)
2023–	Sainte-Geneviève	33	(0)
- * Club domestic league appearances and goals as of 7 December 2024

Ousmane Cardinal N'Diaye (born 19 August 1991) is a Senegalese professional footballer who plays as a defender for French Championnat National 3 club Sainte-Geneviève.

== Career ==
=== Club ===
On 1 March 2021, N'Diaye signed for FC Kaisar.

=== Mohammedan ===
In June 2021, N'Diaye moved to India and signed with I-League club Mohammedan. On 16 August, he made his debut against Goa in the Durand Cup, which ended in a 3–1 comeback win. Eleven days later, he scored his first goal for the club against Indian Air Force, in a 2–0 win.

== Career statistics ==
=== Club ===
As of 5 April 2023

Appearances and goals by club, season and competition
Club	Season	League			National Cup		League Cup		Other		Continental		Total	
Club	Season	Division	Apps	Goals	Apps	Goals	Apps	Goals	Apps	Goals	Apps	Goals	Apps	Goals
Lyon B	2010–11	National 2	28	1	0	0	0	0	—		—		28	1
Arles-Avignon	2011–12	Ligue 2	21	0	0	0	1 (Note: Appearance(s) in Coupe de la Ligue)	0	—		—		22	0
Arles-Avignon	2012–13	Ligue 2	24	0	2 (Note: Appearance(s) in Coupe de France)	0	2	0	—		—		28	0
Arles-Avignon	2013–14	Ligue 2	23	0	0	0	2	0	—		—		25	0
Arles-Avignon	2014–15	Ligue 2	32	1	2	0	4	0	—		—		38	1
Arles-Avignon	Arles-Avignon total		100	1	4	0	9	0	0	0	0	0	113	1
Arles-Avignon B	2013–14	National 3	5	0	0	0	0	0	—		—		5	0
Arles-Avignon B	2014–15	National 3	2	0	0	0	0	0	—		—		2	0
Arles-Avignon B	Arles-Avignon B total		7	0	0	0	0	0	0	0	0	0	7	0
Samsunspor	2015–16	1. Lig	34	1	0	0	0	0	—		—		34	1
Samsunspor	2016–17	1. Lig	25	1	1 (Note: Appearance(s) in Turkish Cup)	0	—		—		—		26	1
Samsunspor	Samsunspor total		59	2	1	0	0	0	0	0	0	0	60	2
Gençlerbirliği	2017–18	Süper Lig	10	0	3	0	—		—		—		13	0
Osmanlıspor	2018–19	1. Lig	16	0	1	0	0	0	—		—		17	0
Sheriff Tiraspol	2019	Moldovan Super Liga	13	0	3 (Note: Appearance(s) in Moldovan Cup)	1	0	0	—		4 (Note: Appearance(s) in UEFA Champions League) (Note: Appearance(s) in UEFA Europa League)	1	20	2
Sheriff Tiraspol	2020–21	Moldovan Super Liga	9	1	0	0	0	0	—		3	0	12	1
Sheriff Tiraspol	Sheriff Tiraspol total		22	1	3	1	0	0	0	0	0	0	25	2
Kaisar	2021	Kazakhstan Premier League	18	0	7 (Note: Appearance(s) in Kazakhstan Cup)	0	0	0	—		—		25	0
Mohammedan	2022–23	I-League	19	0	1 (Note: Appearance(s) in Super Cup)	0	6 (Note: Appearance(s) in Durand Cup)	1	3 (Note: Appearance(s) in Calcutta Football League)	2	—		29	3
Career total			279	5	20	1	15	1	3	2	7	1	324	10

== Honours ==
Mohammedan Sporting

- CFL Premier Division A: 2022
