= Alexandru Răilean =

Moldovan footballer

Personal information
- Full name: Alexandru Răilean
- Date of birth: 4 August 1990 (age 36)
- Place of birth: Suruceni, Moldovan SSR
- Height: 1.78 m (5 ft 10 in)
- Position: Forward

Team information
- Current team: Speranța Nisporeni

Senior career*
Years	Team	Apps	(Gls)
2009–2012	FC Sfîntul Gheorghe	60	(6)
2012–2013	FC Rapid Ghidighici	5	(0)
2013	FC Costuleni	1	(0)
2013–2015	FC Sfîntul Gheorghe	42	(31)
2015	FC Milsami	2	(0)
2015–2017	Spicul Chișcăreni		
2017–	Speranța Nisporeni	5	(2)
- * Club domestic league appearances and goals as of 4 September 2017

Alexandru Răilean (born 4 October 1990) is a Moldavian football forward who plays for Speranța Nisporeni.

== Achievements ==
- League Leading Goalscorer 2013–14 Moldovan "A" Division: 20 goals

== Club statistics ==
- Total matches played in Moldavian First League: 66 matches - 6 goals
