= Jarosław Jach =

Polish footballer (born 1994)

Personal information
- Full name: Jarosław Przemysław Jach
- Date of birth: 17 February 1994 (age 32)
- Place of birth: Bielawa, Poland
- Height: 1.89 m (6 ft 2 in)
- Position: Centre back

Team information
- Current team: Znicz Pruszków
- Number: 10

Youth career
- –2009: Pogoń Pieszyce
- 2009–2011: Lechia Dzierżoniów

Senior career*
Years	Team	Apps	(Gls)
2011–2013	Lechia Dzierżoniów	20	(1)
2013–2018	Zagłębie Lubin	68	(4)
2018–2022	Crystal Palace	0	(0)
2018–2019	→ Çaykur Rizespor (loan)	5	(0)
2019	→ Sheriff Tiraspol (loan)	14	(0)
2019–2020	→ Raków Częstochowa (loan)	24	(2)
2020–2021	→ Fortuna Sittard (loan)	3	(0)
2021	→ Raków Częstochowa (loan)	10	(0)
2022–2025	Zagłębie Lubin	36	(2)
2023–2025	Zagłębie Lubin II	39	(8)
2024	→ Wisła Płock (loan)	10	(0)
2025–	Znicz Pruszków	30	(2)

International career
2015–2017	Poland U21	14	(1)
2017	Poland	2	(0)
- * Club domestic league appearances and goals as of 16:29, 26 May 2026 (UTC)

Jarosław Przemysław Jach (born 17 February 1994) is a Polish professional footballer who plays as a centre back for and captains II liga club Znicz Pruszków.

== Club career ==
=== Zagłębie Lubin ===
He signed with Zagłębie Lubin in 2013 and after a year of playing in the reserve team, he made his debut in Polish top division on May 27, 2014 against Podbeskidzie Bielsko-Biała, coming on as substitute for Đorđe Čotra in 74th minute of the match.

The club eventually got relegated and started the 2014–15 season in second division. Jach made 13 appearances, helping the side to promotion.

In 2015–16 season, he scored his first goal in a 2-1 win over Podbeskidzie Bielsko-Biała on 22 November 2015. He helped his team to win a bronze medal in that season.

In the 2016–17 season and the departure of Maciej Dąbrowski to Legia Warsaw, he became a regular starter for Zagłębie and proved to be a crucial part of the team's defense, which turned out to be the 5th in the league. A series of performances however, was stopped by an injury which caused him to pause for 3 months.

=== Crystal Palace ===
Jach signed for Premier League club Crystal Palace on 23 January 2018 on a three-and-a-half-year contract.

In July 2018, he joined Turkish Süper Lig side Çaykur Rizespor on loan until the end of the 2018–19 season, though this ended early, in February 2019, after he made only five league appearances for the side. Following his return from Rizespor, he joined Moldovan side Sheriff Tiraspol, again on loan. He spent the 2019–20 season back in Poland, this time on loan to Raków Częstochowa, where he played a total of 27 games.

Jach did not make an appearance for Crystal Palace until 15 September 2020, against Bournemouth in the EFL Cup. The game was drawn 0–0 and went to penalties. Jach scored his effort but Palace lost the shootout. In October he signed on loan with Fortuna Sittard until the end of the 2020–21 season. However, in January 2021, he signed on loan with Raków Częstochowa of the Polish Ekstraklasa. On 10 June 2022, Crystal Palace announced that Jach would be released at the expiry of his contract.

=== Return to Zagłębie ===
On 25 June 2022, Jach rejoined Zagłębie Lubin on a three-year contract.

==== Loan to Wisła Płock ====
On 20 January 2024, having spent the first half of the 2023–24 season playing for Zagłębie's reserve team, Jach joined I liga club Wisła Płock on loan until the end of the season.

=== Znicz Pruszków ===
On 5 August 2025, Jach signed with I liga club Znicz Pruszków.

== Career statistics ==
=== Club ===
As of match played 16 May 2026

Appearances and goals by club, season and competition
Club	Season	League			National cup (Note: Includes Polish Cup, Turkish Cup, Cupa Moldovei)		League cup (Note: Includes EFL Cup)		Continental		Total	
Club	Season	Division	Apps	Goals	Apps	Goals	Apps	Goals	Apps	Goals	Apps	Goals
Lechia Dzierżoniów	2011–12	III liga	9	1	—		—		—		9	1
Lechia Dzierżoniów	2012–13	III liga	11	0	—		—		—		11	0
Lechia Dzierżoniów	Total		20	1	—		—		—		20	1
Zagłębie Lubin	2013–14	Ekstraklasa	2	0	0	0	—		—		2	0
Zagłębie Lubin	2014–15	I liga	13	0	2	0	—		—		15	0
Zagłębie Lubin	2015–16	Ekstraklasa	13	2	4	0	—		—		17	2
Zagłębie Lubin	2016–17	Ekstraklasa	23	1	1	0	—		0	0	24	1
Zagłębie Lubin	2017–18	Ekstraklasa	17	1	3	0	—		—		20	1
Zagłębie Lubin	Total		68	4	10	0	—		0	0	78	4
Crystal Palace	2017–18	Premier League	0	0	0	0	0	0	—		0	0
Crystal Palace	2018–19	Premier League	0	0	0	0	0	0	—		0	0
Crystal Palace	2019–20	Premier League	0	0	0	0	0	0	—		0	0
Crystal Palace	2020–21	Premier League	0	0	0	0	1	0	—		1	0
Crystal Palace	2021–22	Premier League	0	0	0	0	0	0	—		0	0
Crystal Palace	Total		0	0	0	0	1	0	—		1	0
Çaykur Rizespor (loan)	2018–19	Süper Lig	5	0	4	1	—		—		9	1
Sheriff Tiraspol (loan)	2019	Divizia Națională	14	0	2	0	—		6 (Note: Two appearances in UEFA Champions League, four appearances in UEFA Europa League)	0	22	0
Raków Częstochowa (loan)	2019–20	Ekstraklasa	24	2	3	0	—		—		27	0
Fortuna Sittard (loan)	2020–21	Eredivisie	3	0	0	0	—		—		3	0
Raków Częstochowa (loan)	2020–21	Ekstraklasa	10	0	0	0	—		—		10	0
Zagłębie Lubin	2022–23	Ekstraklasa	25	1	1	0	—		—		26	1
Zagłębie Lubin	2024–25	Ekstraklasa	11	1	2	1	—		—		13	2
Zagłębie Lubin	Total		36	2	3	1	—		—		39	3
Zagłębie Lubin II	2023–24	II liga	18	2	1	0	—		—		19	2
Zagłębie Lubin II	2024–25	II liga	20	6	1	0	—		1 (Note: Appearance in II liga relegation play-offs)	0	22	6
Zagłębie Lubin II	Total		38	8	2	0	—		1	0	41	8
Wisła Płock (loan)	2023–24	I liga	10	0	—		—		—		10	0
Znicz Pruszków	2025–26	I liga	30	2	2	0	—		—		32	2
Career total			258	19	26	2	1	0	7	0	292	21

=== International ===
Appearances and goals by national team and year
National team	Year	Apps	Goals
Poland	2017	2	0
Total		2	0

== Honours ==
Zagłębie Lubin

- I liga: 2014–15

Sheriff Tiraspol

- Divizia Națională: 2019
- Moldovan Cup: 2018–19

Raków Częstochowa

- Polish Cup: 2020–21

Individual

- I liga Goal of the Season: 2025–26
