= Artiom Rozgoniuc =

Moldovan footballer

Personal information
- Date of birth: 1 October 1995 (age 31)
- Place of birth: Rîbnița, Moldova
- Height: 1.84 m (6 ft 0 in)
- Position: Centre-back

Youth career
- Sheriff Tiraspol

Senior career*
Years	Team	Apps	(Gls)
2012–2014	Sheriff-2 Tiraspol	29	(3)
2013–2020	Sheriff Tiraspol	29	(0)
2016	→ Speranța Nisporeni (loan)	16	(0)
2017	→ Petrocub Hîncești (loan)	16	(1)
2018	→ Sfântul Gheorghe (loan)	8	(1)
2019	→ Sfântul Gheorghe (loan)	19	(0)
2020–2021	Petrocub Hîncești	29	(0)
2022	Maktaaral	22	(2)
2023	Petrocub Hîncești	11	(0)
2023	Olimpia Grudziądz	3	(0)
2024	Liepāja	0	(0)
2024	Grobiņas	11	(1)
2024–2025	Zimbru Chișinău	10	(0)

International career^{‡}
2014–2016	Moldova U21	16	(0)
2017–2021	Moldova	13	(0)
- * Club domestic league appearances and goals as of 14 February 2026 ‡ National team caps and goals as of 14 February 2026

Artiom Rozgoniuc (born 1 October 1995) is a former Moldovan professional footballer who played as a centre-back. He has made 13 caps for the Moldova national team.

== Club career ==
In March 2020, Rozgoniuc signed for Petrocub Hîncești. In February 2022, he moved to Kazakhstan Premier League side Maktaaral. In December 2023, he left Olimpia Grudziądz by mutual consent after only half a season and three appearances.

== International career ==
Rozgoniuc made his debut for the Moldova national team on 5 September 2017 in a World Cup qualifier against Wales.

== Honours ==
Sheriff Tiraspol

- Moldovan Super Liga: 2012–13, 2015–16, 2016–17, 2018, 2019
- Moldovan Cup: 2016–17

Petrocub Hîncești

- Moldovan Cup: 2019–20
