= Gabrijel Boban =

Croatian professional footballer

Personal information
- Date of birth: 23 July 1989 (age 37)
- Place of birth: Požega, SFR Yugoslavia
- Height: 1.86 m (6 ft 1 in)
- Positions: Winger; forward

Team information
- Current team: Cibalia
- Number: 7

Youth career
- 1998–2007: Kamen Ingrad

Senior career*
Years	Team	Apps	(Gls)
2007–2008	Kamen Ingrad	21	(2)
2008–2009	Virovitica		
2009–2012	Vinogradar	71	(10)
2012–2013	Pomorac	29	(8)
2013–2016	NK Zagreb	96	(41)
2016–2019	Osijek	81	(12)
2019–2021	Sheriff Tiraspol	16	(4)
2021	Varaždin	11	(1)
2022–2025	Posušje	78	(19)
2025–	Cibalia	28	(13)
- * Club domestic league appearances and goals as of 16 June 2026

Gabrijel Boban (born 23 July 1989) is a Croatian professional footballer who plays as a winger for Croatian Prva NL club Cibalia.

== Career ==
=== Early career ===
Born in Požega, Boban went through the youth ranks of the nearby Kamen Ingrad team from Velika who was competing in Prva HNL at the time. He debuted for the first team in the 2007–08 season in Druga HNL were Kamen Ingrad was relegated from Prva HNL just the season before. In his first professional season he made a 21 appearances scoring twice, but was unable to contribute more and prevent the club from yet another relegation in the end. Club's performance over last two seasons declined drastically resulting in relegations due to various financial difficulties caused by embezzlement and fraud problems within main club sponsor, a local construction company of the same name Kamen Ingrad. As the team was relegated further down to Treća HNL for the 2008–09 season, just before the start of competition, on 23 July 2008, club announced its withdrawal from senior competitions for the season. Boban was allowed to leave on free release and a week later he decided to join another third tier club, Virovitica.

He returned to Druga HNL quickly, however, playing three seasons at Vinogradar. In the 2011–12 season, he scored four goals in 24 appearances. In the 2012–13 season he played for Pomorac. At Pomorac, Boban was a mainstay in the starting lineup and added eight goals to his tally that season.

=== NK Zagreb ===
The impressive season earned him a move to the newly relegated NK Zagreb in the summer of 2013. He helped Zagreb return to the Prva HNL by scoring 18 goals during the season, trailing only behind Inter Zaprešić's Ilija Nestorovski (20 goals) in the league's overall rankings. He made his Prva HNL debut three days short of his 25th birthday, scoring in the 1–3 loss against Rijeka, repeating the feat a week later in his second top tier match, against Slaven Belupo. He finished his first season in the top tier with 13 goals, the fourth highest total in the league.

=== Osijek ===
Gabrijel Boban signed for Osijek in July 2016, on a three-year contract. He scored 4 goals and contributed 6 assists. In his second season, he scored 6 goals and contributed 9 assists in all competitions, notably scoring in a 1–0 away win over Dinamo Zagreb. For his performances, he was voted as the NK Osijek Player of the Year.

=== Sheriff Tiraspol ===
Gabrijel Boban move to Sheriff Tiraspol in June 2019 on a free transfer. He signed an 18 months contract.

== Personal life ==
Boban's family originates from Sovići in Herzegovina, and he is a distant cousin of Croatia international Zvonimir Boban. Gabrijel Boban is the brother of Bruno Boban who was also a footballer of Slavonija Požega.
