= Andrei Rusnac =

Moldovan footballer (born 1996)

Personal information
- Date of birth: 22 September 1996 (age 30)
- Place of birth: Chișinău, Moldova
- Position: Midfielder

Team information
- Current team: Bălți
- Number: 96

Youth career
- CSCT Buiucani

Senior career*
Years	Team	Apps	(Gls)
2012–2014	Academia Chișinău	13	(0)
2014–2015	Victoria Bardar	24	(2)
2015–2017	Zimbru-2 Chișinău	31	(1)
2016–2017	Zimbru Chișinău	17	(1)
2017–2020	Milsami	67	(1)
2021–2022	Dacia Buiucani	10	(0)
2022–	Bălți	64	(1)

International career
2018	Moldova U21	2	(0)
- * Club domestic league appearances and goals as of 1 June 2026

Andrei Rusnac (born 22 September 1996) is a Moldovan professional footballer who plays as a midfielder for Moldovan Liga club Bălți.

== Personal life ==
He is the son of Moldovan former player and current manager Veaceslav Rusnac.

== Honours ==
Milsami

- Moldovan Cup: 2017–18
- Moldovan Super Cup: 2019
