= Dan Taras =

Moldovan footballer

Personal information
- Date of birth: 13 April 1994 (age 32)
- Place of birth: Sărata-Galbenă, Moldova
- Height: 1.83 m (6 ft 0 in)
- Position: Midfielder

Senior career*
Years	Team	Apps	(Gls)
2013	Rapid Ghidighici	12	(0)
2014–2020	Petrocub Hîncești	159	(21)
2021	Sfântul Gheorghe	10	(1)
2021	Ripensia Timișoara	4	(1)

International career^{‡}
2016	Moldova U21	4	(1)
2018–	Moldova	3	(0)
- * Club domestic league appearances and goals as of 11:33, 2 February 2022 (UTC) ‡ National team caps and goals as of 06:58, 4 April 2021 (UTC)

Dan Taras (born 13 April 1994) is a Moldovan footballer who plays as a midfielder.

== Career ==
Born in Sărata-Galbenă, he has played club football for Rapid Ghidighici, Petrocub Hîncești, Sfântul Gheorghe and Ripensia Timișoara.

He made his international debut for Moldova in 2018.
