= Yury Kendysh =

Belarusian footballer

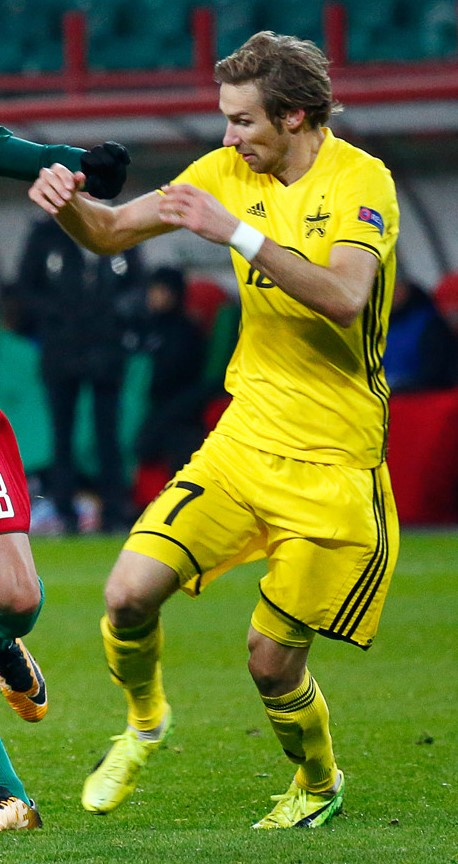
- Kendysh with Sheriff Tiraspol in 2017

Personal information
- Date of birth: 10 June 1990 (age 36)
- Place of birth: Minsk, Belarusian SSR, Soviet Union
- Height: 1.87 m (6 ft 1 1/2 in)
- Position: Midfielder

Team information
- Current team: Žalgiris
- Number: 77

Youth career
- 2007–2009: MTZ-RIPO Minsk

Senior career*
Years	Team	Apps	(Gls)
2007–2011	Partizan Minsk	66	(3)
2007	→ MTZ-RIPO-2 Minsk	29	(1)
2008	→ PMC Postavy (loan)	14	(0)
2012	Torpedo-BelAZ Zhodino	11	(0)
2012	Slavia Mozyr	11	(0)
2013	Dinamo Brest	19	(1)
2014	Trakai	34	(4)
2015	Žalgiris Vilnius	31	(6)
2016–2017	BATE Borisov	41	(3)
2017	→ Sheriff Tiraspol (loan)	7	(2)
2018–2019	Sheriff Tiraspol	43	(15)
2020–2021	Shakhtyor Soligorsk	44	(7)
2022–2023	Riga	31	(6)
2023–	Žalgiris	110	(12)

International career^{‡}
2011–2012	Belarus U21	7	(0)
2016–2021	Belarus	15	(2)
- * Club domestic league appearances and goals as of 17 June 2026 ‡ National team caps and goals as of 31 March 2021

Yury Kendysh (Belarusian: Юрый Кендыш; Russian: Юрий Кендыш; born 10 June 1990) is a Belarusian professional footballer who plays as a midfielder for A Lyga club Žalgiris.

== Honours ==
Žalgiris Vilnius

- A Lyga champion: 2015
- Lithuanian Football Cup winner: 2014–15

BATE Borisov

- Belarusian Premier League champion: 2016, 2017
- Belarusian Super Cup winner: 2016, 2017

Sheriff Tiraspol

- Moldovan National Division champion: 2017, 2018, 2019
- Moldovan Cup winner: 2018–19

Shakhtyor Soligorsk

- Belarusian Premier League champion: 2020, 2021
- Belarusian Super Cup winner: 2021

Individual

- Moldovan National Division Top Scorer 2019
