= Vladimir Kovačević (footballer, born 1992) =

Serbian footballer

Personal information
- Date of birth: 11 November 1992 (age 34)
- Place of birth: Odžaci, FR Yugoslavia
- Height: 1.90 m (6 ft 3 in)
- Position: Centre-back

Youth career
- –2010: Vojvodina

Senior career*
Years	Team	Apps	(Gls)
2010–2013	Vojvodina	5	(0)
2010–2011	→ Hajduk Kula (loan)	17	(1)
2012–2013	→ Proleter Novi Sad (loan)	30	(1)
2013–2016	Spartak Subotica	82	(4)
2016	Vojvodina	16	(2)
2017–2020	Kortrijk	35	(2)
2018–2019	→ Sheriff Tiraspol (loan)	15	(2)
2020–2022	Vojvodina	27	(0)
2022–2023	Mladost GAT	18	(0)
2023–2024	Dynamo Makhachkala	45	(2)
2025–2026	Sokol Saratov	44	(2)

International career
2008–2009	Serbia U17		
2009–2010	Serbia U18	2	(0)
2014	Serbia U21	1	(0)
2016	Serbia	1	(0)
- * Club domestic league appearances and goals as of 16 May 2026

Vladimir Kovačević (Serbian Cyrillic: Владимир Ковачевић, born 11 November 1992) is a Serbian footballer who plays as a centre-back.

== Career ==
Kovačević is a product of Vojvodina youth system.

=== Vojvodina ===
He made his professional debut for Vojvodina against Javor in May 2010, but due to extremely strong competition for two central defender positions, he never managed to make an impact at the club.

==== Hajduk Kula ====
Kovačević was loaned to another Serbian SuperLiga side Hajduk Kula for 2010–11 season. There, he didn't make an immediate impact, but as the season progressed, he established himself as one of the club's top defenders. He scored his first senior goal against Red Star Belgrade in a surprise 2–0 home win.

==== Proleter Novi Sad ====
After loan return from Hajduk, Kovačević spent an entire season 2011–12 trying to break into the first team, but has only made 3 league appearances. Next season, he was loaned out to local Serbian First League side Proleter Novi Sad.

=== Spartak Subotica ===
At the beginning of August 2013, Kovačević signed with Serbian SuperLiga side Spartak Subotica. During his stay, Vladimir finally managed to break into the first team. In three seasons, he reached two Serbian Cup semifinals with the club(in 2013–14 and 2015–16). Kovačević was primarily used as a centre-back, but was equally successful when deployed as a defensive midfielder. His above-par performances drew the attention of multiple clubs, including his former club Vojvodina.

=== Second spell at Vojvodina ===
On 1 June 2016, Kovačević re-signed for Vojvodina, on a three-year deal.

=== Kortrijk ===
After 6 months in Vojvodina, on 28 January 2017, Kovačević signed a four-and-a-half-year deal with Belgian side Kortrijk.

==== Sheriff Tiraspol ====
On 20 June 2018, Moldovan club Sheriff Tiraspol announced they had signed Kovačević on loan from Kortrijk. Kovačević left Sheriff Tiraspol a year later when his loan expired, having played 24 games and scoring three goals.

=== Third spell at Vojvodina ===
On 27 July 2020, Kovačević signed a two-year deal with Vojvodina.

=== Sokol Saratov ===
On 16 January 2025, Kovačević signed with Sokol Saratov in Russian First League.

== International career ==
Kovačević made his international debut for the Serbia national team in a friendly 3–0 loss to Qatar.

== Career statistics ==
As of match played 16 May 2026

Club	Season	League			Cup		Continental		Other		Total	
Club	Season	Division	Apps	Goals	Apps	Goals	Apps	Goals	Apps	Goals	Apps	Goals
Vojvodina	2009–10	Serbian SuperLiga	2	0	—		—		—		2	0
Vojvodina	2011–12	Serbian SuperLiga	3	0	0	0	0	0	—		3	0
Vojvodina	2013–14	Serbian SuperLiga	—		—		1 (Note: Appearances in the UEFA Europa League)	0	—		1	0
Vojvodina	Total		5	0	0	0	1	0	0	0	6	0
Hajduk Kula (loan)	2010–11	Serbian SuperLiga	17	1	0	0	—		—		17	1
Proleter Novi Sad (loan)	2012–13	Serbian SuperLiga	30	1	1	0	—		—		31	1
Spartak Subotica	2013–14	Serbian SuperLiga	27	3	4	0	—		—		31	3
Spartak Subotica	2014–15	Serbian SuperLiga	22	0	3	0	—		—		25	0
Spartak Subotica	2015–16	Serbian SuperLiga	33	1	4	0	—		—		37	1
Spartak Subotica	Total		82	4	11	0	0	0	0	0	93	4
Vojvodina	2016–17	Serbian SuperLiga	16	2	0	0	5	0	—		21	2
Kortrijk	2016–17	Belgian Pro League	10	1	—		—		—		10	1
Kortrijk	2017–18	Belgian Pro League	20	1	2	0	—		—		22	1
Kortrijk	2019–20	Belgian Pro League	5	0	2	0	—		—		7	0
Kortrijk	Total		35	2	4	0	0	0	0	0	39	2
Sheriff Tiraspol (loan)	2018	Moldovan Super Liga	8	0	2	1	5 (Note: Three appearances in the UEFA Champions League, two appearances in the UEFA Europa League)	0	—		15	1
Sheriff Tiraspol (loan)	2019	Moldovan Super Liga	7	2	3	0	—		1 (Note: Appearance in Moldovan Super Cup)	0	11	2
Sheriff Tiraspol (loan)	Total		15	2	5	1	5	0	1	0	26	3
Vojvodina	2020–21	Serbian SuperLiga	9	0	0	0	0	0	—		9	0
Vojvodina	2021–22	Serbian SuperLiga	18	0	4	0	4 (Note: Appearances in the UEFA Europa Conference League)	0	—		26	0
Vojvodina	Total		27	0	4	0	4	0	0	0	35	0
Mladost GAT	2022–23	Serbian SuperLiga	18	0	0	0	—		—		18	0
Dynamo Makhachkala	2022–23	Russian First League	12	1	—		—		—		12	1
Dynamo Makhachkala	2023–24	Russian First League	32	1	0	0	—		—		32	1
Dynamo Makhachkala	2024–25	Russian Premier League	1	0	2	0	—		—		3	0
Dynamo Makhachkala	Total		45	2	2	0	0	0	0	0	47	2
Sokol Saratov	2024–25	Russian First League	13	2	—		—		—		13	2
Sokol Saratov	2025–26	Russian First League	31	0	0	0	—		—		31	0
Sokol Saratov	Total		44	2	0	0	0	0	0	0	44	2
Career total			334	16	27	1	15	0	1	0	377	17
