= Robert Ndip Tambe =

Cameroonian footballer (born 1994)

Robert Tambe
Personal information
- Full name: Robert Ndip Tambe
- Date of birth: 22 February 1994 (age 32)
- Place of birth: Buea, Cameroon
- Height: 1.84 m (6 ft 0 in)
- Position: Forward

Youth career
- 2010–2013: Njala Quan Sports Academy

Senior career*
Years	Team	Apps	(Gls)
2015	LZS Piotrówka	13	(18)
2016–2017	Spartak Trnava	39	(6)
2017–2018	Adana Demirspor	28	(12)
2018–2020	CFR Cluj	6	(2)
2019–2020	→ Sheriff Tiraspol (loan)	23	(9)
2020–2022	Shaanxi Chang'an Athletic	55	(20)
2023	Jinan Xingzhou	23	(13)
2024	Yelimay	12	(1)

International career
2016–2017	Cameroon	10	(0)
Medal record
Men's football
Representing Cameroon
Africa Cup of Nations
Winner	2017 Gabon
- * Club domestic league appearances and goals as of 2 October 2024

Robert Ndip Tambe (born 22 February 1994) is a Cameroonian professional footballer who plays as a forward.

== Club career ==
Tambe is from the English-speaking part of Cameroon and started his career there as well, at Njala Quan Sports Academy in Limbe.

=== Spartak Trnava ===
In January 2016, Tambe signed a two-year contract with the Slovak side Spartak Trnava. He made his professional debut for Trnava against Michalovce on 27 February 2016.

=== Adana Demirspor ===
On 31 July 2017, Tambe joined Turkish club Adana Demirspor.

=== CFR Cluj & Sheriff Tiraspol loan ===
On 4 July 2018, it was announced that Tambe signed a deal with Romanian defending champions CFR Cluj. He scored two goals in ten appearances all competitions comprised in the first half of the season, before agreeing to a year-long loan with Moldovan side Sheriff Tiraspol on 24 January 2019. On 30 January 2020, Tambe was released by CFR Cluj.

=== Shaanxi Chang'an Athletic ===
On 29 February 2020, Tambe joined China League One side Shaanxi Chang'an Athletic.

=== Jinan Xingzhou ===
On 21 April 2023, Tambe joined newly promoted China League One side Jinan Xingzhou.

=== Yelimay ===
In February 2024, Tambe joined Kazakhstan Premier League club Yelimay.

== International career ==
Tambe made his senior debut for the Cameroon national football team in a 2–0 win over The Gambia for 2017 Africa Cup of Nations qualification.

== Career statistics ==
As of 28 October 2023

Appearances and goals by club, season and competition
Club	Season	League			National cup		Continental		Other		Total	
Club	Season	Division	Apps	Goals	Apps	Goals	Apps	Goals	Apps	Goals	Apps	Goals
LZS Piotrówka	2014–15	IV liga Opole	13	18	—		—		—		13	18
Spartak Trnava	2015–16	Slovak First Football League	11	0	0	0	—		—		11	0
Spartak Trnava	2016–17	Slovak First Football League	27	6	2	1	5	4	—		34	11
Spartak Trnava	2017–18	Slovak First Football League	1	0	0	0	—		—		1	0
Spartak Trnava	Total		39	6	2	1	5	4	0	0	46	11
Spartak Trnava B	2015–16	2. Liga	1	0	—		—		—		1	0
Adana Demirspor	2017–18	TFF First League	28	12	3	2	—		—		31	14
CFR Cluj	2018–19	Liga I	6	2	0	0	2	1	0 (Note: Appearances in Supercupa României)	0	8	3
Sheriff Tiraspol (loan)	2019	Moldovan National Division	23	9	2	1	6	2	1 (Note: Appearances in Moldovan Super Cup)	0	32	12
Shaanxi Chang'an Athletic	2020	China League One	5	0	—		—		—		5	0
Shaanxi Chang'an Athletic	2021	China League One	32	14	2	1	—		—		34	15
Shaanxi Chang'an Athletic	2022	China League One	18	6	—		—		—		18	6
Shaanxi Chang'an Athletic	Total		55	20	2	1	0	0	0	0	57	21
Jinan Xingzhou	2023	China League One	23	13	—		—		—		23	13
Career total			193	80	9	5	13	7	1	0	211	92

== Honours ==
LZS Piotrówka

- IV liga Opole: 2014–15

CFR Cluj

- Liga I: 2018–19
- Supercupa României: 2018

Cameroon

- Africa Cup of Nations: 2017
