= Dinamo-Auto Stadium =

Football stadium

Dinamo-Auto Sports Complex
- Complexul sportiv Dinamo-Auto
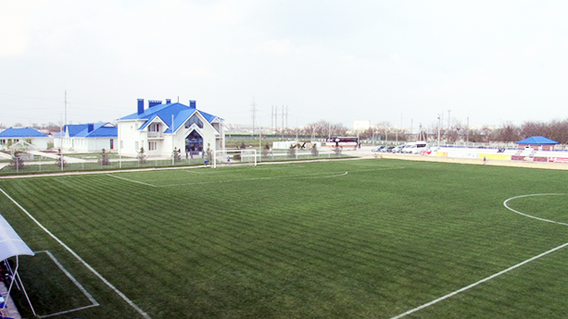
- The stadium in 2013
- Interactive map of Dinamo-Auto Sports Complex
- Address: 1/4 Lenin Street; Tîrnauca; Transnistria, Moldova
- Coordinates: 46.823660°N 29.547230°E
- Capacity: 1,400
- Surface: Grass
- Field size: 100 x 70 m

Construction
- Opened: 2011

Tenant
- Dinamo-Auto Tiraspol (2011–2024)

Dinamo-Auto Sports Complex is a football stadium in Moldova built in 2011. It is based in village Tîrnauca, near Tiraspol.
