= Ion Ibrian =

Moldovan footballer

Personal information
- Full name: Ion Ibrian
- Date of birth: 21 March 1998 (age 28)
- Place of birth: Moldova
- Height: 1.84 m (6 ft 0 in)
- Position: Forward

Team information
- Current team: Bradford Park Avenue

Senior career*
Years	Team	Apps	(Gls)
2014–2016	Real Succes	15	(1)
2015–2016	→ Spicul Chișcăreni (loan)	23	(7)
2016	Zimbru-2 Chișinău	9	(4)
2016	Zimbru Chișinău	2	(0)
2017	Speranța Nisporeni	10	(0)
2017	Real Succes	5	(8)
2018–2020	Milsami Orhei	16	(2)
2020	Codru Lozova	7	(1)
2020–	Bradford Park Avenue	3	(0)

International career^{‡}
2014	Moldova U17 (Note: Only official UEFA matches included)	3	(0)
2016	Moldova U19	3	(0)
- * Club domestic league appearances and goals as of 1 December 2020 ‡ National team caps and goals as of 14 November 2016

Ion Ibrian is a Moldovan footballer who plays for Bradford Park Avenue, as a forward.

== Club career ==
On 26 November 2016, Ibrian made his professional debut with Zimbru Chișinău in a 2016–17 Divizia Națională match against Sheriff Tiraspol.

On 19 November 2020, Ibrian joined English National League North club Bradford Park Avenue.
