= Tîrnauca =

Tîrnauca Терновка (Russian) Тернівка (Ukrainian)
- Commune
- Location within Moldova
- Coordinates: 46°48′45″N 29°33′24″E
- Country (de jure): Moldova
- Country (de facto): Transnistria (Note: Transnistria's political status is disputed. It considers itself to be an independent state, but this is not recognised by any UN member state. The Moldovan government and the international community consider Transnistria a part of Moldova's territory.)
- Elevation: 12 m (39 ft)
- Time zone: UTC+2 (EET)
  - Summer (DST): UTC+3 (EEST)

Tîrnauca (Moldovan Cyrillic: Тырнаука; Ukrainian: Тернівка, Ternivka, Russian: Терновка, Ternovka) is a commune and village in the Slobozia District of the Left Bank of the Dniester, Moldova, situated on the east bank of the river Dniester, between Tighina and Tiraspol. It is notable for being home to the largest bottle-shaped building in the world, the Butylka hotel and museum.

According to the 2004 census, the village's population was 5,015, of which 3,146 (62.73%) were Moldovans (Romanians), 632 (12.6%) Ukrainians and 1,039 (20.71%) Russians.
