= CSR Orhei =

Football stadium in Orhei, Moldova

Coordinates: 47.3744°N 28.8192°E

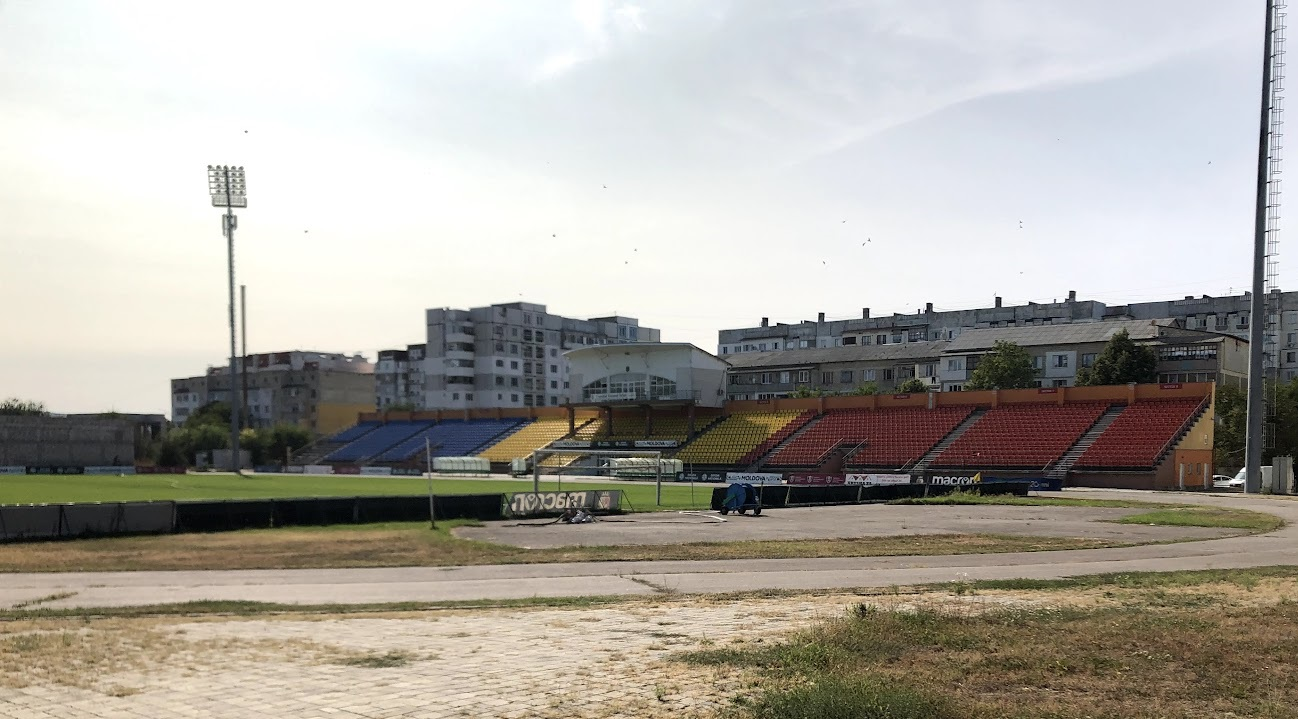
- CSR Orhei in 2020; UEFA
- Interactive map of CSR Orhei
- Full name: Complexul Sportiv Raional Orhei
- Address: 13 Scrisului Latin Street; Orhei; Moldova
- Owner: Milsami Orhei
- Capacity: 3,000
- Surface: Grass
- Field size: 105 x 68 m

Construction
- Opened: 1980
- Renovated: 2007

Tenants
- Milsami Orhei; Moldova national rugby union team

Complexul Sportiv Raional Orhei (CSR Orhei) is a football stadium in Moldova founded in 1980. In 2005 began the demolition of the old wooden stand, to make way for a new building, modern. Orhei sports complex, along with those of Zimbru and Sheriff, is one of the most modern in the country.

It is also used by the Moldova national rugby union team.
