= FC Dinamo-Auto Tiraspol =

Former association football club in Moldova

Dinamo-Auto Tiraspol
- Full name: Fotbal Club Dinamo-Auto Tiraspol
- Founded: 24 July 2009
- Dissolved: 2024
- Ground: Dinamo-Auto Stadium; Tîrnauca, Moldova
- Capacity: 1,300
- Final season; 2023–24: Liga 1, Group B, 8th of 8 (withdrew)
Home colours	Away colours

Fotbal Club Dinamo-Auto Tiraspol, commonly known as FC Dinamo-Auto Tiraspol, or simply Dinamo-Auto, was a Moldovan football club from Tiraspol, Moldova, playing in the village of Tîrnauca, Slobozia.

== History ==
In the summer of 2022, the Pelican impresario agency took over the club from Tiraspol and announced that they would use the team as a launching pad for players who were under contract with the agency.

Before the start of 2022–23 season of the Moldovan Super Liga, the new management of Dinamo-Auto changed the whole squad, bringing 23 new players, 5 Moldovans and 18 foreigners.

=== League and cup ===
Season	Div	Pos	Pld	W	D	L	GF	GA	Pts	Cup	Europe		Top Scorer (League)
2009–10	3rd "North"	1_{/13}	24	17	5	2	69	11	56	?	—		
2010–11	2nd	3_{/15}	28	17	6	5	52	26	57	First round	—		
2011–12	2nd	7_{/16}	30	13	7	10	52	32	46	Second round	—		
2012–13	2nd	3_{/15}	28	17	5	6	51	23	56	Round of 16	—		(Moldova) Maxim Iurcu (19)
2013–14	1st	8_{/12}	33	9	4	20	37	72	31	Round of 16	—		(Moldova) Sergiu Ciuico (6)
2014–15	1st	8_{/11}	24	4	2	18	23	63	14	Quarter-finals	—		(Moldova) Vadim Cemîrtan (7)
2015–16	1st	5_{/10}	27	12	5	10	33	34	41	Quarter-finals	—		(Moldova) Andrei Bugneac (11)
2016–17	1st	9_{/11}	30	5	8	17	31	58	23	Quarter-finals	—		(Moldova) Octavian Onofrei (8)
2017	1st	9_{/10}	18	4	3	11	14	38	15	Semi-finals	—		(Moldova) Alexei Casian (3)
2018	1st	6_{/8}	28	7	7	14	25	43	28	Quarter-finals	—		(Moldova) Eugeniu Rebenja (7)
2019	1st	4_{/8}	28	12	5	11	38	37	41	Quarter-finals	—		(Moldova) Maxim Mihaliov (10)
2020–21	1st	6_{/10}	36	12	12	12	53	58	48	Semi-finals	EL	1Q	(Moldova) Maxim Mihaliov (12)
2021–22	1st	6_{/8}	28	9	5	14	35	72	32	Semi-finals	—		(Moldova) Marin Căruntu (6)
2022–23	1st	8_{/8}	14	1	3	10	5	26	0 (Note: FC Dinamo-Auto Tiraspol have been deducted 6 points for match fixing.)	Round of 16	—		
2022–23	2nd - Group 1	3_{/6} (Note: Dinamo-Auto have won the play-off, but haven't received the license in order to promote.)	10	5	2	3	22	9	17	Round of 16	—		

=== European ===
As of 27 August 2020

Season	Competition	Round	Club	Home	Away	Agg.
2020–21	UEFA Europa League	1QR	(Latvia) Ventspils	—N/a	1–2	—N/a

Notes

- QR: Qualifying round

== Achievements ==
- Divizia B
  - Winners (1): 2009–10
