= Radu Mîțu =

Moldovan footballer

Personal information
- Date of birth: 4 November 1994 (age 32)
- Place of birth: Orhei, Moldova
- Height: 1.86 m (6 ft 1 in)
- Position: Goalkeeper

Team information
- Current team: Celle Varazze
- Number: 1

Senior career*
Years	Team	Apps	(Gls)
2013–2019	Milsami Orhei	125	(0)
2020–2022	Vasalunds IF	49	(0)
2022	Örebro SK	0	(0)
2022–2023	Albenga		
2023–2024	Vadese		
2024–	Celle Varazze		

International career
2015–2016	Moldova U21	6	(0)
- * Club domestic league appearances and goals as of 9 May 2022

Radu Mîțu (born 4 November 1994) is a Moldovan footballer who plays as a goalkeeper for Italian Serie D club Celle Varazze.

== Club career ==
After spending his entire career with Milsami Orhei, Mîțu signed for Swedish Division 1 club Vasalunds IF in March 2020. He left the club in December 2021, after suffering relegation from Superettan, making him a free agent.

On 17 April 2022, he signed a three-months contract with Örebro SK, remaining in Superettan.
