= 2019 Moldovan National Division =

Divizia Națională
- Season: 2019
- Dates: 16 March 2019 – 9 November 2019
- Champions: Sheriff; 18th title
- Champions League: Sheriff
- Europa League: Petrocub; Sf. Gheorghe; Dinamo-Auto
- Matches: 112
- Goals: 255 (2.28 per match)
- Top goalscorer: Yury Kendysh (13 goals)
- Best goalkeeper: Dumitru Celeadnic (15 clean sheets)
- Biggest home win: Sheriff 5–0 Sf. Gheorghe (31 May 2019)
- Biggest away win: Dinamo-Auto 0–4 Sheriff (3 April 2019); Speranța 0–4 Sheriff (3 May 2019); Zimbru 0–4 Sheriff (12 May 2019); Codru 0–4 Sf. Gheorghe (6 October 2019)
- Highest scoring: Codru 2–5 Dinamo-Auto (4 May 2019); Dinamo-Auto 3–4 Speranța (25 August 2019)
- Longest winning run: 13 matches Sheriff
- Longest unbeaten run: 21 matches Sheriff
- Longest winless run: 28 matches Codru
- Longest losing run: 10 matches Codru
- Highest attendance: 1,800; Milsami 1–2 Sheriff (26 May 2019)
- Lowest attendance: 40; Dinamo-Auto 1–0 Milsami (31 August 2019)
- Total attendance: 49,990
- Average attendance: 446

The 2019 Moldovan National Division (Romanian: Divizia Națională) was the 29th season of top-tier football in Moldova. The season started on 16 March 2019 and ended on 9 November 2019. Sheriff Tiraspol were the defending champions. The winners of the league this season earned a spot in the first qualifying round of the 2020–21 UEFA Champions League, and the second, third and fourth placed clubs earned a place in the first qualifying round of the 2020–21 UEFA Europa League.

== Teams ==
A total of 8 teams will contest the league. These include 7 teams from the 2018 season and one promoted team from the "A" Division: Codru Lozova, making their debut in the top flight. Zaria Bălți were relegated from the Divizia Națională, ending a streak of 13 seasons at the highest level.

Team	Place	Ground	Capacity	Coach
Codru	Lozova	Zimbru-2 Stadium	2,000	(Moldova) Valeriu Andronic
Dinamo-Auto	Tiraspol	Dinamo-Auto Stadium	1,300	(Russia) Igor Dobrovolski
Milsami	Orhei	CSR Orhei	3,000	(Moldova) Veaceslav Rusnac
Petrocub-Hîncești	Sărata-Galbenă	Hîncești Stadium	1,000	(Moldova) Lilian Popescu
Sfîntul Gheorghe	Suruceni	Suruceni Stadium	1,500	(Moldova) Serghei Cebotari
Sheriff	Tiraspol	Sheriff Stadium	12,726	(Croatia) Zoran Zekić
Speranța	Nisporeni	CSR Orhei	3,000	(Moldova) Cristian Efros
Zimbru	Chișinău	Zimbru Stadium	10,400	(Moldova) Vladimir Aga

=== Managerial changes ===
Team	Outgoing manager	Manner of departure	Date of vacancy	Position in table	Replaced by	Date of appointment
Sheriff	(Croatia) Goran Sablić	Resigned	27 April 2019	1st	(Croatia) Zoran Zekić	30 April 2019
Zimbru	(Romania) Sorin Colceag	Resigned	8 July 2019	7th	(Moldova) Vladimir Aga	15 July 2019
Zimbru	(Moldova) Vladimir Aga	Resigned	31 October 2019	7th	(Moldova) Veaceslav Sofroni (interim)	1 November 2019

== League table ==
Pos	Team	Pld	W	D	L	GF	GA	GD	Pts	Qualification or relegation
1	Sheriff Tiraspol (C)	28	22	4	2	60	9	+51	70	Qualification for the Champions League first qualifying round
2	Sfîntul Gheorghe	28	16	5	7	40	28	+12	53	Qualification for the Europa League first qualifying round (Note: Since the winners of 2019–20 Moldovan Cup, Petrocub-Hîncești, qualified for European competition based on their league position, the spot awarded to the Cup winner (Europa League first qualifying round) was passed to the next best-placed team (the fourth-placed team).)
3	Petrocub-Hîncești	28	14	8	6	34	21	+13	50	Qualification for the Europa League first qualifying round
4	Dinamo-Auto	28	12	5	11	38	37	+1	41	Qualification for the Europa League first qualifying round
5	Milsami Orhei	28	10	9	9	30	28	+2	39	
6	Speranța Nisporeni	28	8	11	9	29	34	−5	35	
7	Zimbru Chișinău	28	3	7	18	16	43	−27	16	
8	Codru Lozova (O)	28	0	5	23	8	55	−47	5	Qualification to Relegation play-off

Source: FMF, UEFA, Soccerway
Rules for classification: 1) Points; 2) Play-off (only if deciding champion when two teams tied); 3) Head-to-head points; 4) Head-to-head goal difference; 5) Head-to-head away goals scored; 6) Head-to-head goals scored; 7) Matches won; 8) Goal difference; 9) Goals scored; 10) Less red cards; 11) Less yellow cards.
(C) Champions; (O) Play-off winners

== Results ==
Matches 1−14

Teams will play each other twice (once home, once away).

Home \ Away	COD	DIN	MIL	PET	SFÎ	SHE	SPE	ZIM
Codru Lozova	—	2–5	0–3	0–1	1–2	0–2	1–3	0–3
Dinamo-Auto	3–0	—	0–0	0–1	3–0	0–4	0–3	0–0
Milsami Orhei	0–0	3–1	—	2–0	0–3	1–2	1–1	3–0
Petrocub-Hîncești	1–1	0–1	1–1	—	2–2	1–0	4–1	1–0
Sfîntul Gheorghe	2–0	3–1	1–1	1–0	—	0–3	0–0	2–0
Sheriff Tiraspol	2–1	3–0	0–1	2–0	5–0	—	1–0	3–0
Speranța Nisporeni	2–1	0–1	0–1	1–1	2–2	0–4	—	1–0
Zimbru Chișinău	1–1	1–1	0–1	0–1	1–2	0–4	0–2	—

Source: FMF, Soccerway
Legend: Blue = home team win; Yellow = draw; Red = away team win.

Matches 15−28

Teams will play each other twice (once home, once away).

Home \ Away	COD	DIN	MIL	PET	SFÎ	SHE	SPE	ZIM
Codru Lozova	—	0–1	0–2	0–1	0–4	0–3	0–0	0–2
Dinamo-Auto	4–0	—	1–0	2–0	2–1	0–3	3–4	4–0
Milsami Orhei	3–0	0–2	—	0–3	0–2	1–1	0–0	1–1
Petrocub-Hîncești	1–0	3–0	1–1	—	0–2	0–0	2–2	1–0
Sfîntul Gheorghe	1–0	1–0	3–0	0–2	—	0–1	0–0	2–1
Sheriff Tiraspol	2–0	2–0	2–1	1–1	2–1	—	3–0	3–0
Speranța Nisporeni	1–0	1–1	2–1	1–3	1–2	0–0	—	0–0
Zimbru Chișinău	0–0	2–2	1–2	0–2	0–1	1–2	2–1	—

Source: FMF, Soccerway
Legend: Blue = home team win; Yellow = draw; Red = away team win.

== Results by round ==
The following table represents the teams game results in each round.

Team	1	2	3	4	5	6	7	8	9	10	11	12	13	14	15	16	17	18	19	20	21	22	23	24	25	26	27	28
Codru Lozova	L	L	L	L	D	L	L	L	D	L	L	L	L	D	L	L	L	L	L	L	L	L	L	L	D	L	L	D
Dinamo-Auto	W	W	L	D	L	D	L	W	L	L	D	W	L	W	W	L	L	D	L	W	L	W	W	L	W	D	W	W
Milsami Orhei	L	W	W	W	W	D	D	D	D	D	L	W	W	W	L	W	L	L	D	L	D	L	W	D	D	W	L	L
Petrocub-Hîncești	W	L	L	D	D	D	W	W	W	D	L	W	W	L	W	W	W	L	W	W	D	W	L	D	W	W	D	D
Sfîntul Gheorghe	W	D	W	D	L	W	W	D	D	W	W	L	W	L	W	W	W	W	L	W	W	W	D	W	L	L	W	L
Sheriff Tiraspol	W	W	W	L	W	W	L	W	W	W	W	W	W	W	W	W	W	W	W	W	D	D	W	W	D	W	W	D
Speranța Nisporeni	L	D	W	W	W	D	D	L	D	W	W	L	L	L	L	L	L	W	W	L	D	D	D	D	D	D	D	W
Zimbru Chișinău	L	L	L	D	L	L	W	L	L	L	D	L	L	D	L	L	W	D	D	L	W	L	L	D	L	L	L	D

== Top goalscorers ==
Rank	Player	Club	Goals
1	(Belarus) Yury Kendysh	Sheriff	13
2	(Moldova) Maxim Iurcu	Speranța	11
3	(Moldova) Maxim Mihaliov	Dinamo-Auto	10
4	(Cameroon) Robert Tambe	Sheriff	9
5	(Moldova) Vadim Cemîrtan	Sf. Gheorghe	6
5	(Moldova) Dmitri Mandrîcenco	Sf. Gheorghe	6
5	(Moldova) Sergiu Istrati	Sf. Gheorghe	6
5	(Moldova) Vadim Gulceac	Petrocub	6
5	(Moldova) Dan Taras	Petrocub	6
10	(Moldova) Alexandru Boiciuc	Sf. Gheorghe	5
10	(Moldova) Vladimir Ambros	Petrocub	5
10	(Moldova) Alexandru Antoniuc	Milsami	5
10	(Moldova) Dan Pîslă	Zimbru	5

== Clean sheets ==
Rank	Player	Club	Clean sheets
1	(Moldova) Dumitru Celeadnic	Sheriff	15
2	(Moldova) Nicolae Cebotari	Sf. Gheorghe	12
3	(Moldova) Cristian Avram	Petrocub (7) & Dinamo-Auto (3)	10
4	(Moldova) Denis Macogonenco	Speranța	7
4	(Moldova) Radu Mîțu	Milsami	7
6	(Moldova) Dorian Railean	Petrocub	6
7	(Moldova) Victor Străistari	Dinamo-Auto	5
7	(Ukraine) Maksym Kovalyov	Zimbru	5
9	(Croatia) Zvonimir Mikulić	Sheriff	4
9	(Moldova) Alexandru Zveaghințev	Dinamo-Auto	4

== Attendances ==
Pos	Team	Total	High	Low	Average	Change
1	Sheriff Tiraspol	13,000	1,500	500	928	−33.1%
2	Petrocub-Hîncești	10,100	1,500	200	721	−22.1%
3	Milsami Orhei	9,850	1,800	250	703	−34.0%
4	Zimbru Chișinău	6,350	1,000	200	453	−64.8%
5	Sfîntul Gheorghe	3,150	400	100	225	−7.8%
6	Speranța Nisporeni	2,900	400	100	207	−36.3%
7	Codru Lozova	2,900	400	50	207	n/a
8	Dinamo-Auto	1,740	400	40	124	+24.0%
	League total	49,990	1,800	40	446	−45.2%

Source: fmf (in Romanian)

== Relegation play-off ==
A play-off match was played between the eight-placed team from Divizia Națională and the third-placed team from Divizia A for one place in the next season. The "home" team (for administrative purposes) was determined in a draw held on 12 November 2019.

16 November 2019
13:00 EET

Spartanii Selemet	0–1	Codru Lozova
	Report	V. Semenchenko 90+3'

Municipal Stadium, Hîncești
Attendance: 200
Referee: Petru Stoianov
