= FC Sfîntul Gheorghe =

Association football club in Moldova

Sfîntul Gheorghe
- Full name: Fotbal Club Sfîntul Gheorghe
- Founded: 11 July 2003; 23 years ago
- Dissolved: 14 July 2023; 3 years ago
- Ground: Suruceni Stadium
- Capacity: 350
Home colours	Away colours

FC Sfîntul Gheorghe was a Moldovan professional football club based in Suruceni that existed between 2003 and 2023.

== History ==
FC Sfîntul Gheorghe was founded in 2003. Until 2007, it was represented by seven youth teams, aged 10–18 years. In 2007, the Under-18 team became the champion of The Republic of Moldova. In 2008–09, the club decided to enter the second tier of Moldovan football, the Divizia A.

In 2009, due to an excellent infrastructure of two stadiums, one with artificial turf and another with natural turf, the club met all the licensing criteria and obtained the "A" licence, which allowed the team to play in the Divizia Națională.

In July 2023, the club ceased to exist amid a scandal involving match-fixing and the arrest of several players. The financial problems arising from the same scandal also played a decisive role in the termination of the club's existence.

== Honours ==
=== League ===
- Divizia Națională
  - Runners-up: 2019
- Divizia A
  - Runners-up: 2016–17

=== Cup ===
- Cupa Moldovei
  - Winners: 2020–21
  - Runners-up: 2018–19, 2019–20, 2021–22
- Supercupa Moldovei
  - Winners: 2021

== League results ==
Season	Div.	Pos.	Pl.	W	D	L	GS	GA	P	Cup	Top Scorer (League)
2008–09	2nd	11	30	10	4	16	41	46	34	1/32	Unknown
2009–10	1st	11	33	6	6	21	29	67	24	1/16	(Moldova) Mihai Plătică (6)
2010–11	1st	12	39	6	7	26	30	83	25	1/8	(Moldova) Petru Ojog (4)
2011–12	1st	10	33	7	9	17	23	55	30	1/8	(Ghana) Eric Sackey (7)
2012–13	2nd	8	28	12	4	12	38	51	40	1/16	(Moldova) Alexandru Țurcan (7)
2013–14	2nd	5	24	12	3	9	40	28	39	1/8	(Moldova) Alexandru Răilean (20)
2014–15	2nd	6	22	10	3	9	41	34	33	1/16	(Moldova) Alexandru Răilean (11)
2015–16	2nd	12	26	6	6	14	43	60	24	1/32	(Moldova) Sergiu Plătică (12)
2016–17	2nd	2	28	21	3	4	79	23	66	1/8	(Moldova) Alexandru Maxim (16)
2017	1st	7	18	5	5	8	15	27	20	1/8	(Moldova) Alexandru Maxim (3)
2018	1st	7	28	6	8	14	30	50	26	RU	(Moldova) Sergiu Istrati (6)
2019	1st	2	28	16	5	7	40	28	53	RU	3 players (6)
2020–21	1st	4	36	21	4	11	65	43	67	W	(Belarus) Roman Volkov (12)
2021–22	1st	4	28	10	8	10	38	39	38	RU	(Moldova) Victor Stînă (7)
2022–23	1st	5	24	7	5	12	22	35	26	1/2	(Nigeria) Jibril Ibrahim (5)

== European record ==
Competition	Played	Won	Drew	Lost	GF	GA	GD	Win%
UEFA Europa League	2	0	1	1	0	1	−1	0.00
UEFA Europa Conference League	4	0	0	4	6	12	−6	0.00
Total	6	0	1	5	6	13	−7	0.00

Legend: GF = Goals For; GA = Goals Against; GD = Goal Difference.

Season	Competition	Round	Club	Home	Away	Aggregate
2020–21	UEFA Europa League	1QR	(Belarus) Shakhtyor Soligorsk	—N/a	0–0 (4–1 p)	—N/a
2020–21	UEFA Europa League	2QR	(Serbia) Partizan	0–1 (a.e.t)	—N/a	—N/a
2021–22	UEFA Europa Conference League	1QR	(Albania) Partizani	2–3	2–5	4–8
2022–23	UEFA Europa Conference League	1QR	(Slovenia) Mura	1–2	1–2	2–4

Notes

- QR: Qualifying round
