= 2021–22 FC Sheriff Tiraspol season =

Sheriff Tiraspol
2021–22 season
- Chairman: Viktor Gushan
- Manager: Yuriy Vernydub (Until 24 February); Dmytro Kara-Mustafa (Acting) (from 24 February)
- Stadium: Sheriff Stadium
- Divizia Naţională: 1st
- Moldovan Cup: Winners
- Super Cup: Runners-up
- UEFA Champions League: Group stage
- UEFA Europa League: Knockout round play-offs
- Top goalscorer: League: Momo Yansané (11); All: Adama Traoré (15)
| Home colours | Away colours |

The 2021–22 season was FC Sheriff Tiraspol's 25th season, and their 24th in the Divizia Naţională, the top-flight of Moldovan football. Sheriff were defending Divizia Naţională champions and also took part in the Moldovan Cup, as well as entering the UEFA Champions League in the first qualifying round.

== Season events ==
On 18 June, Sheriff Tiraspol announced the loan signing of Giorgos Athanasiadis from AEK Athens.

On 29 June, Sheriff Tiraspol announced the signing of Hansel Zapata from La Equidad. Two days later, 1 July, Sheriff Tiraspol announced the return of Henrique Luvannor, and the signing of Momo Yansané.

On 14 July, Sheriff Tiraspol announced the signing of Edmund Addo from Senica.

On 29 July, Sheriff Tiraspol announced the permanent signing of Dimitris Kolovos after he'd spent the 2020–21 season on loan at the club.

On 20 August, Sheriff Tiraspol announced the signing of Boban Nikolov on a free transfer after he'd left Lecce, and the signing of Bruno from Aris Thessaloniki.

On 29 August, Henrique Luvannor left Sheriff Tiraspol to sign for Al Taawoun, whilst Jasurbek Yakhshiboev joined the club the following day on loan from Legia Warsaw.

On 13 September, Sheriff Tiraspol announced the signing of Stefanos Evangelou on a free transfer after he'd previously played for Górnik Zabrze.

On 16 September, Sheriff Tiraspol announced the signing of Abdoul Moumouni from US GN, with Basit Khalid joining on a free transfer the following day after he'd previously played for Espérance Tunis.

On 24 December, Sheriff Tiraspol announced that Head Coach Yuriy Vernydub had signed a new contract with the club until the end of 2024.

On 14 January, Sheriff Tiraspol announced that Cristiano had been sold to Fluminense, whilst Danilo Arboleda, Frank Castañeda, Nadrey Dago and Dušan Marković had all left the club. The following day, 15 January, Sheriff Tiraspol announced the signing of Pernambuco on loan from Lviv until the end of the season with an option to make the move permanent.

On 17 January, Sheriff Tiraspol announced the signing of Patrick Kpozo from Östersunds. Four days later, 21 January, Sheriff Tiraspol announced the signing of fellow Ghanaian international Razak Abalora from Asante Kotoko.

On 26 January, Sheriff Tiraspol announced the signing of Gaby Kiki from Rukh Brest and Renan Guedes from Bahia.

On 30 January, Krylia Sovetov announced the signing of Fernando from Sheriff Tiraspol.

On 2 February, Sheriff Tiraspol announced the signing of Regi Lushkja from Laçi and the departure of Dimitris Kolovos to Kocaelispor.

On 9 February, Sheriff Tiraspol announced the signing of Cedric Badolo on loan from Pohronie.

On 16 February, Sheriff Tiraspol announced the signing of Danil Ankudinov on loan from Rodina Moscow.

Following Sheriff Tiraspol's 2–0 defeat to Braga in the Knockout round play-off of the UEFA Europa League, Head Coach Yuriy Vernydub left his position to join the Armed Forces of Ukraine in response to Russia's invasion of Ukraine that began on the 24th February 2022.

== Squad ==
As of match played 22 May 2022

| No. | Name | Nationality | Position | Date of birth (age) | Signed from | Signed in | Contract ends | Apps. | Goals |
Goalkeepers
| 1 | Dumitru Celeadnic | (Moldova) | GK | 23 April 1992 (aged 30) | Petrocub Hîncești | 2019 | | 50 | 0 |
| 30 | Giorgos Athanasiadis | (Greece) | GK | 7 April 1993 (aged 29) | loan from AEK Athens | 2021 | 2022 | 34 | 0 |
| 33 | Serghei Pașcenco | (Moldova) | GK | 18 December 1982 (aged 39) | Zaria Bălți | 2018 | | 127+ | 0 |
| 40 | Razak Abalora | (Ghana) | GK | 4 September 1996 (aged 25) | Asante Kotoko | 2022 | | 6 | 0 |
Defenders
| 3 | Charles Petro | (Malawi) | DF | 8 February 2001 (aged 21) | Big Bullets | 2020 | | 49 | 2 |
| 6 | Stjepan Radeljić | (Bosnia and Herzegovina) | DF | 5 September 1997 (aged 24) | Osijek | 2022 | | 45 | 2 |
| 15 | Gaby Kiki | (Cameroon) | DF | 15 February 1995 (aged 27) | Rukh Brest | 2022 | | 10 | 1 |
| 16 | Keston Julien | (Trinidad and Tobago) | DF | 26 October 1998 (aged 23) | AS Trenčín | 2020 | | 50 | 1 |
| 29 | Danila Ignatov | (Moldova) | DF | 19 June 2001 (aged 20) | Academy | 2020 | | 0 | 0 |
| 41 | Stefanos Evangelou | (Greece) | DF | 12 May 1998 (aged 24) | Górnik Zabrze | 2021 | | 9 | 0 |
| 42 | Renan Guedes | (Brazil) | DF | 19 January 1998 (aged 24) | Bahia | 2022 | | 10 | 0 |
| 55 | Gustavo Dulanto | (Peru) | DF | 5 September 1995 (aged 26) | Boavista | 2021 | | 54 | 4 |
Midfielders
| 2 | Patrick Kpozo | (Ghana) | MF | 15 July 1997 (aged 24) | Östersunds | 2022 | | 6 | 0 |
| 4 | Adrian Khatman | (Moldova) | MF | 1 May 2003 (aged 19) | Academy | 2021 | | 1 | 0 |
| 12 | Abdoul Moumouni | (Niger) | MF | 7 August 2002 (aged 19) | US GN | 2021 | | 5 | 0 |
| 18 | Moussa Kyabou | (Mali) | MF | 18 April 1998 (aged 24) | USC Kita | 2021 | | 28 | 0 |
| 19 | Serafim Cojocari | (Moldova) | MF | 7 January 2001 (aged 21) | Zimbru Chisinau | 2020 | | 5 | 0 |
| 20 | Boban Nikolov | (North Macedonia) | MF | 28 July 1994 (aged 27) | Unattached | 2021 | | 22 | 4 |
| 21 | Edmund Addo | (Ghana) | MF | 17 May 2000 (aged 22) | Senica | 2021 | | 33 | 1 |
| 22 | Regi Lushkja | (Albania) | MF | 17 May 1996 (aged 26) | Laçi | 2022 | | 9 | 3 |
| 24 | Eugeniu Gliga | (Moldova) | MF | 12 May 2001 (aged 21) | Academy | 2020 | | 7 | 0 |
| 31 | Sébastien Thill | (Luxembourg) | MF | 29 December 1993 (aged 28) | loan from Progrès Niederkorn | 2021 | | 56 | 14 |
| 77 | Bruno | (Brazil) | MF | 26 May 1994 (aged 27) | Aris Thessaloniki | 2021 | | 29 | 6 |
| 88 | Cedric Badolo | (Burkina Faso) | MF | 4 November 1998 (aged 23) | loan from Pohronie | 2022 | | 12 | 6 |
Forwards
| 7 | Basit Khalid | (Ghana) | FW | 10 August 1996 (aged 25) | Unattached | 2021 | | 19 | 7 |
| 9 | Adama Traoré | (Mali) | FW | 5 June 1995 (aged 26) | Metz | 2021 | | 61 | 25 |
| 17 | Jasurbek Yakhshiboev | (Uzbekistan) | FW | 24 June 1997 (aged 24) | loan from Legia Warsaw | 2021 | | 12 | 2 |
| 23 | Danil Ankudinov | (Kazakhstan) | FW | 31 July 2003 (aged 18) | Rodina Moscow | 2022 | | 4 | 0 |
| 28 | Pernambuco | (Brazil) | FW | 28 April 1998 (aged 24) | Lviv | 2022 | 2022 | 13 | 5 |
| 99 | Momo Yansané | (Guinea) | FW | 29 July 1997 (aged 24) | Nizhny Novgorod | 2021 | | 30 | 12 |
Out on loan
| 8 | Alexandr Belousov | (Moldova) | DF | 14 May 1998 (aged 24) | Academy | 2018 | | 57 | 4 |
| 17 | Hansel Zapata | (Colombia) | MF | 11 February 1995 (aged 27) | La Equidad | 2021 | | 6 | 0 |
| 32 | Valeriu Gaiu | (Moldova) | DF | 6 February 2001 (aged 21) | Academy | 2020 | | 19 | 0 |
| 35 | Evgheni Pleşco | (Moldova) | DF | 25 February 2001 (aged 21) | Academy | 2020 | | 0 | 0 |
| | Vadim Dijinari | (Moldova) | DF | 1 April 1999 (aged 23) | Youth Team | 2019 | | 5 | 2 |
Left during the season
| 2 | Danilo Arboleda | (Colombia) | DF | 16 May 1995 (aged 27) | Deportivo Pasto | 2020 | | 45 | 4 |
| 7 | Andriy Bliznichenko | (Ukraine) | MF | 24 July 1994 (aged 27) | Kardemir Karabükspor | 2019 | | 24 | 12 |
| 10 | Frank Castañeda | (Colombia) | FW | 17 July 1994 (aged 27) | Senica | 2020 | | 74 | 42 |
| 11 | Lovro Bizjak | (Slovenia) | FW | 12 November 1993 (aged 28) | Ufa | 2021 | | 29 | 11 |
| 13 | Fernando | (Brazil) | DF | 29 November 1998 (aged 23) | Botafogo | 2021 | | 41 | 1 |
| 15 | Cristiano | (Brazil) | DF | 29 August 1993 (aged 28) | Volta Redonda | 2018 | | 162 | 3 |
| 22 | Dimitris Kolovos | (Greece) | MF | 27 April 1993 (aged 29) | Panathinaikos | 2021 | | 48 | 16 |
| 23 | Nadrey Dago | (Ivory Coast) | FW | 7 May 1997 (aged 25) | Osijek | 2021 | | 35 | 10 |
| 26 | Dušan Marković | (Serbia) | GK | 3 April 1998 (aged 24) | Rad | 2021 | | 17 | 0 |
| 27 | Peter Banda | (Malawi) | FW | 22 September 2000 (aged 21) | loan from Big Bullets | 2021 | | 20 | 5 |
| 70 | Henrique Luvannor | (Moldova) | FW | 19 May 1990 (aged 32) | Al Wahda | 2021 | | 116 | 53 |
| 90 | Veaceslav Posmac | (Moldova) | DF | 7 November 1990 (aged 31) | Dacia Chișinău | 2017 | | 120 | 7 |
| 98 | Maxim Cojocaru | (Moldova) | MF | 13 January 1998 (aged 24) | Petrocub Hîncești | 2019 | | 43 | 6 |

=== Out on loan ===
Note: Flags indicate national team as defined under FIFA eligibility rules; some limited exceptions apply. Players may hold more than one non-FIFA nationality.

| No. | Pos. | Nation | Player |
|---|---|---|---|
| 8 | DF | MDA | Alexandr Belousov (at Sfîntul Gheorghe) |
| 17 | MF | COL | Hansel Zapata (at Slaven Belupo) |
| 32 | DF | MDA | Valeriu Gaiu (at Bălți) |

| No. | Pos. | Nation | Player |
|---|---|---|---|
| 35 | DF | MDA | Evgheni Pleşco (at Dinamo-Auto Tiraspol) |
| — | DF | MDA | Vadim Dijinari (at Milsami Orhei) |

== Transfers ==
=== In ===
| Date | Position | Nationality | Name | From | Fee | Ref. |
|---|---|---|---|---|---|---|
| 29 June 2021 | MF | (Colombia) | Hansel Zapata | La Equidad | Undisclosed | |
| 1 July 2021 | FW | (Moldova) | Henrique Luvannor | Al Wahda | Undisclosed | |
| 1 July 2021 | FW | (Guinea) | Momo Yansané | Nizhny Novgorod | Undisclosed | |
| 14 July 2021 | MF | (Ghana) | Edmund Addo | Senica | Undisclosed | |
| 29 July 2021 | MF | (Greece) | Dimitris Kolovos | Panathinaikos | Undisclosed | |
| 20 August 2021 | MF | (North Macedonia) | Boban Nikolov | Unattached | Free | |
| 20 August 2021 | MF | (Brazil) | Bruno | Aris Thessaloniki | Undisclosed | |
| 13 September 2021 | DF | (Greece) | Stefanos Evangelou | Unattached | Free | |
| 16 September 2021 | MF | (Niger) | Abdoul Moumouni | US GN | Undisclosed | |
| 17 September 2021 | FW | (Ghana) | Basit Khalid | Unattached | Free | |
| 1 January 2022 | DF | (Bosnia and Herzegovina) | Stjepan Radeljić | Osijek | Undisclosed | |
| 17 January 2022 | DF | (Ghana) | Patrick Kpozo | Östersunds | Undisclosed | |
| 21 January 2022 | GK | (Ghana) | Razak Abalora | Asante Kotoko | Undisclosed | |
| 26 January 2022 | DF | (Cameroon) | Gaby Kiki | Rukh Brest | Undisclosed | |
| 26 January 2022 | DF | (Brazil) | Renan Guedes | Bahia | Undisclosed | |
| 2 February 2022 | MF | (Albania) | Regi Lushkja | Laçi | Undisclosed | |
| 16 February 2022 | FW | (Kazakhstan) | Danil Ankudinov | Rodina Moscow | Undisclosed | |

=== Loans in ===
| Date from | Position | Nationality | Name | From | Date to | Ref. |
|---|---|---|---|---|---|---|
| 9 February 2021 | FW | (Malawi) | Peter Banda | Big Bullets | 31 July 2021 | |
| 11 February 2021 | DF | (Bosnia and Herzegovina) | Stjepan Radeljić | Osijek | 31 December 2021 | |
| 18 June 2021 | GK | (Greece) | Giorgos Athanasiadis | AEK Athens | End of season | |
| 30 August 2021 | MF | (Uzbekistan) | Jasurbek Yakhshiboev | Legia Warsaw | End of season | |
| 15 January 2022 | FW | (Brazil) | Pernambuco | Lviv | End of season | |
| 9 February 2022 | MF | (Burkina Faso) | Cedric Badolo | Pohronie | End of season | |

=== Out ===
| Date | Position | Nationality | Name | To | Fee | Ref. |
|---|---|---|---|---|---|---|
| 12 July 2021 | DF | (Moldova) | Veaceslav Posmac | Tuzlaspor | Undisclosed | |
| 29 August 2021 | FW | (Moldova) | Henrique Luvannor | Al Taawoun | Undisclosed | |
| 14 January 2022 | DF | (Brazil) | Cristiano | Fluminense | Undisclosed | |
| 30 January 2022 | DF | (Brazil) | Fernando | Krylia Sovetov | Undisclosed | |
| 2 February 2022 | MF | (Greece) | Dimitris Kolovos | Kocaelispor | Undisclosed | |
| 15 February 2022 | FW | (Slovenia) | Lovro Bizjak | NK Celje | Undisclosed | |

=== Loans out ===
| Date from | Position | Nationality | Name | To | Date to | Ref. |
|---|---|---|---|---|---|---|
| 2 July 2021 | DF | (Moldova) | Valeriu Gaiu | Dinamo-Auto Tiraspol | 31 December 2021 | |
| 3 September 2021 | MF | (Colombia) | Hansel Zapata | Slaven Belupo | End of season | |
| 23 February 2022 | DF | (Moldova) | Valeriu Gaiu | Bălți | End of season | |
| 5 March 2022 | DF | (Moldova) | Alexandr Belousov | Sfîntul Gheorghe | End of season | |

=== Released ===
| Date | Position | Nationality | Name | Joined | Date | Ref. |
|---|---|---|---|---|---|---|
| 31 August 2021 | MF | (Ukraine) | Andriy Bliznichenko | Inhulets Petrove | | |
| 31 December 2021 | GK | (Serbia) | Dušan Marković | Metalac Gornji Milanovac | | |
| 31 December 2021 | DF | (Colombia) | Danilo Arboleda | Al Ain | 7 January 2022 | |
| 31 December 2021 | MF | (Moldova) | Maxim Cojocaru | Petrocub Hîncești | 8 March 2022 | |
| 31 December 2021 | FW | (Colombia) | Frank Castañeda | Warta Poznań | 11 February 2022 | |
| 31 December 2021 | FW | (Ivory Coast) | Nadrey Dago | Panetolikos | 31 January 2022 | |
| 30 June 2022 | MF | (Brazil) | Bruno | AC Omonia | 1 July 2022 | |
| 30 June 2022 | MF | (North Macedonia) | Boban Nikolov | FCSB | 17 September 2022 | |

== Friendlies ==
| 15 June 2021 | Sheriff Tiraspol | 4–0 | Florești | Tiraspol |
| 18:00 EEST (UTC+3) | Goal | | | Stadium: Sheriff Stadium |

| 18 June 2021 | Sheriff Tiraspol (Moldova) | 1–0 | (Russia) Akron Tolyatti | Tiraspol |
| 18:00 EEST (UTC+3) | Banda | Report | | Stadium: Sheriff Stadium |

| 22 June 2021 | Sheriff Tiraspol | 1–0 | Zimbru Chișinău | Tiraspol |
| 18:00 EEST (UTC+3) | Bizjak 9' | Report | | Stadium: Sheriff Stadium |

| 29 January 2022 | Sheriff Tiraspol | 3–0 | Sfîntul Gheorghe | Tiraspol |
| 13:00 EET (UTC+2) | Trialist; Yakhshiboev 28'; Khalid 81' | Report | | Stadium: Sheriff Stadium |

| 3 February 2022 | Sheriff Tiraspol | 1–1 | Zimbru Chișinău | Tiraspol |
| 14:00 EET (UTC+2) | Khalid 39' | Report | 35' (pen.) | Stadium: Sheriff Stadium |

| 6 February 2022 | Sheriff Tiraspol | 1–0 | Bălți | Tiraspol |
| 16:00 EET (UTC+2) | Traoré | Report | | Stadium: Sheriff Stadium |

| 9 February 2022 | Sheriff Tiraspol | 2–0 | Dinamo-Auto Tiraspol | Tiraspol |
| 13:00 EET (UTC+2) | Yakhshiboev | Report | | Stadium: Sheriff Stadium |

| 19 February 2022 | Sheriff Tiraspol (Moldova) | 2–1 | (Ukraine) Balkany Zorya | Tiraspol |
| 14:00 EET (UTC+2) | Lushkja | Report | Goal | Stadium: Sheriff Stadium |

== Competitions ==
=== Overall record ===
| Competition | First match | Last match | Starting round | Final position | Record | | | | | | | |
| Competition | First match | Last match | Starting round | Final position | Pld | W | D | L | GF | GA | GD | Win % |
|---|---|---|---|---|---|---|---|---|---|---|---|---|
| National Division | 1 July 2021 | 14 May 2022 | Matchday 1 | Winners | 28 | 22 | 4 | 2 | 75 | 8 | +67 | 78.57 |
| Moldovan Cup | 27 October 2021 | 21 May 2022 | Round of 16 | Winners | 4 | 4 | 0 | 0 | 14 | 2 | +12 | 100.00 |
| Supercup | 26 June 2021 | | Final | Runners Up | 1 | 0 | 1 | 0 | 2 | 2 | +0 | 0.00 |
| UEFA Champions League | 7 July 2021 | 7 December 2021 | First qualifying round | Group Stage | 14 | 8 | 3 | 3 | 21 | 13 | +8 | 57.14 |
| UEFA Europa League | 17 February 2022 | 24 February 2022 | Knockout round play-off | Knockout round play-off | 2 | 1 | 0 | 1 | 2 | 2 | +0 | 50.00 |
| Total | | | | | 49 | 35 | 8 | 6 | 114 | 27 | +87 | 71.43 |

Last updated: 22 May 2022
Source: Competitions

=== Divizia Națională ===
==== League table ====
| Pos | Team | Pld | W | D | L | GF | GA | GD | Pts | Qualification or relegation |
|---|---|---|---|---|---|---|---|---|---|---|
| 1 | Sheriff Tiraspol (C) | 28 | 22 | 4 | 2 | 75 | 8 | +67 | 70 | Qualification for the Champions League first qualifying round |
| 2 | Petrocub Hîncești | 28 | 20 | 4 | 4 | 62 | 20 | +42 | 64 | Qualification for the Europa Conference League first qualifying round |
| 3 | Milsami Orhei | 28 | 15 | 6 | 7 | 50 | 31 | +19 | 51 | Qualification for the Europa Conference League first qualifying round |
| 4 | Sfîntul Gheorghe | 28 | 10 | 8 | 10 | 38 | 39 | −1 | 38 | Qualification for the Europa Conference League first qualifying round |
| 5 | Bălți | 28 | 11 | 3 | 14 | 39 | 39 | 0 | 36 | |

Source: FMF, UEFA, Soccerway
Rules for classification: 1) Points; 2) Play-off (only if deciding champion when two teams tied); 3) Head-to-head points; 4) Head-to-head goal difference; 5) Head-to-head away goals scored; 6) Head-to-head goals scored; 7) Matches won; 8) Goal difference; 9) Goals scored; 10) Least red cards; 11) Least yellow cards.
(C) Champions

==== Results summary ====
| Overall | | | | | | | | Home | | | | | | Away | | | | | |
| Pld | W | D | L | GF | GA | GD | Pts | W | D | L | GF | GA | GD | W | D | L | GF | GA | GD |
|---|---|---|---|---|---|---|---|---|---|---|---|---|---|---|---|---|---|---|---|
| 28 | 22 | 4 | 2 | 75 | 8 | +67 | 70 | 12 | 0 | 2 | 43 | 3 | +40 | 10 | 4 | 0 | 32 | 5 | +27 |

Last updated: 14 May 2022.
Source: FMF

==== Results ====
| 1 July 2021 1 | Sheriff Tiraspol | 0–1 | Bălți | Tiraspol |
| 20:00 EEST (UTC+3) | Julien (yellow card) 12'; Dulanto (yellow card) 56'; Radeljić (yellow card) 68'; Belousov (yellow card) 77' | Report | E.Alaribe 20' (yellow card) 45'; R.Gómez (yellow card) 32'; Furtună (yellow card) 56'; Á.Bely (yellow card) 80'; A.Nazarchuk (yellow card) 86'; S.Molochko (yellow card) 88' | Stadium: Sheriff Stadium; Referee: Daniel Luka |

| 31 July 2021 4 | Florești | 1–3 | Sheriff Tiraspol | Bender |
| 18:00 EEST (UTC+3) | Cobeț 33' | Report | Yansané 17'; Radeljić 59'; Bizjak 90+5' | Stadium: Dinamo Stadium; Referee: Yuri Kovtun |

| 7 August 2021 5 | Sheriff Tiraspol | 7–1 | Dinamo-Auto Tiraspol | Tiraspol |
| 20:00 EEST (UTC+3) | Arboleda 7'; Dago 27'; Luvannor 34'; Yansané 62', 90+1'; Thill 71' (pen.); Bizjak 90' | Report | A.Genaev (yellow card) 55'; O.Bulat 73' | Stadium: Malaya Sportivnaya Arena; Referee: Alexander Stefchuk |

| 28 August 2021 8 | Bălți | 0–2 | Sheriff Tiraspol | Bălți |
| 20:00 EEST (UTC+3) | Furtună (yellow card) 11' | Report | Yansané 44'; Dago 51'; Cristiano (yellow card) 59' | Stadium: Stadionul Orășenesc; Referee: Veaceslav Banar |

| 12 September 2021 9 | Sheriff Tiraspol | 2–0 | Petrocub Hîncești | Tiraspol |
| 19:00 EEST (UTC+3) | Fernando (yellow card) 57'; Castañeda 71'; Yakhshiboev 77'; Cristiano (yellow card) 88' | Report | Efros (yellow card) 85' | Stadium: Sheriff Stadium; Referee: Igor Boschka |

| 18 September 2021 10 | Zimbru Chișinău | 1–1 | Sheriff Tiraspol | Chișinău |
| 19:00 EEST (UTC+3) | S.Yahaya (yellow card) 27'; Burghiu 61'; O.Ebenezer (yellow card) 87'; P.Neagu (yellow card) 90' | Report | Nikolov 34'; Evangelou (yellow card) 90'; Arboleda (yellow card) 90' | Stadium: Zimbru Stadium; Referee: Gabriel Tupichka |

| 22 September 2021 11 | Sheriff Tiraspol | 4–0 | Florești | Tiraspol |
| 19:00 EEST (UTC+3) | Nikolov (yellow card) 14'; Bruno 22'; Traoré 50'; Radeljić 85'; Dago 90+2' | Report | | Stadium: Sheriff Stadium; Referee: Yuri Kovtun |

| 25 September 2021 12 | Dinamo-Auto Tiraspol | 0–7 | Sheriff Tiraspol | Tîrnauca |
| 16:00 EEST (UTC+3) | Gurbanli (yellow card) 87' | Report | Thill 10'; Petro 36'; Kolovos 49', 57'; Dago (yellow card) 68'; Nikolov 70'; Castañeda 73', 80'; Addo (yellow card) 87' | Stadium: Dinamo-Auto Stadium; Referee: Denis Ivlev |

| 2 October 2021 13 | Milsami Orhei | 0–1 | Sheriff Tiraspol | Orhei |
| 18:00 EEST (UTC+3) | Dedov (yellow card) 39'; Lambarschi (yellow card) 78'; Bolohan (yellow card) 78'; Racu (yellow card) 90+3' | Report | Fernando (yellow card) 63'; Traoré 69'; Addo (red card) 76'; Dulanto (yellow card) 78'; Dago (yellow card) 86' | Stadium: CSR Orhei; Referee: Peter Stoyanov |

| 16 October 2021 14 | Sheriff Tiraspol | 4–0 | Sfîntul Gheorghe | Tiraspol |
| 18:00 EEST (UTC+3) | Arboleda 4'; Castañeda 18'; Kolovos (yellow card) 22'; Bruno 26'; Dago 90+2' | Report | Prepeliță (yellow card) 22'; Stînă (yellow card) 57' | Stadium: Sheriff Stadium; Referee: Gennadiy Sidenko |

| 23 October 2021 15 | Sheriff Tiraspol | 2–0 | Bălți | Tiraspol |
| 17:00 EEST (UTC+3) | Khalid 45'; Traoré 54'; Fernando (yellow card) 61'; Bruno (yellow card) 69' | Report | Moțpan (yellow card) 44'; Furtună (yellow card) 55' | Stadium: Sheriff Stadium; Referee: Gabriel Tupichka |

| 31 October 2021 16 | Petrocub Hîncești | 0–2 | Sheriff Tiraspol | Hîncești |
| 15:00 EET (UTC+2) | Revenco (yellow card) 6'; Efros (yellow card) 29'; Plătică (yellow card) 30'; Melachio (yellow card) 68' | Report | Thill 32'; Traoré (yellow card) 40'; Dulanto (yellow card) 49'; Athanasiadis (yellow card) 78'; Khalid 90' | Stadium: Stadionul Municipal; Referee: Roman Zhitar |

| 6 November 2021 17 | Sheriff Tiraspol | 6–0 | Zimbru Chișinău | Tiraspol |
| 17:00 EET (UTC+2) | Castañeda 17'; Thill 41'; Arboleda 44'; Khalid 48'; Traoré 57'; Cojocaru 61' | Report | | Stadium: Sheriff Stadium; Referee: Igor Boscha |

| 21 November 2021 18 | Florești | 1–3 | Sheriff Tiraspol | Bender |
| 13:00 EET (UTC+2) | Cobeț 31'; I.Bondarenco (yellow card) 54' | Report | Traoré 19'; Khalid 47'; Nikolov 75' (yellow card) 90' | Stadium: Dinamo Stadium; Referee: Ion Orlic |

| 28 November 2021 19 | Sheriff Tiraspol | 7–0 | Dinamo-Auto Tiraspol | Tiraspol |
| 17:00 EET (UTC+2) | Yansané 10', 16'; Fernando 26'; Thill 33'; Kolovos 39'; Khalid 44'; Castañeda 60' | Report | A.Cuzmenco (yellow card) 56' | Stadium: Sheriff Stadium; Referee: Stanislav Leu |

| 2 December 2021 2 | Petrocub Hîncești | 0–0 | Sheriff Tiraspol | Hîncești |
| 13:00 EET (UTC+2) | Cotogoi (yellow card) 40'; R.Banzaru (yellow card) 90'; Meira (yellow card) 90+2' | Report | Traoré (yellow card) 10'; Cristiano (yellow card) 31'; Addo (yellow card) 36'; Dulanto (yellow card) 71' | Stadium: Stadionul Municipal; Referee: Daniel Luca |
Note: Match postponed on 17 July due to Sheriff Tiraspol's UEFA Champions League second qualifying round match against Alashkert on 20 July.

| 11 December 2021 3 | Sheriff Tiraspol | 4–0 | Zimbru Chișinău | Tiraspol |
| 16:00 EET (UTC+2) | Arboleda (yellow card) 17'; Yansané 21', 73', 75'; Thill 35' (pen.) (yellow card) 53' | Report | C.Dani (yellow card) 47'; O.Ebenezer (yellow card) 48' (yellow-red card) 77'; T.Pavalachi (yellow card) 54'; Sidorenco (yellow card) 90+1' | Stadium: Sheriff Stadium; Referee: Gennady Sidenko |

| 1 March 2022 6 | Sheriff Tiraspol | 1–0 | Milsami Orhei | Tiraspol |
| 19:00 EET (UTC+2) | Traoré 63'; Badolo (yellow card) 84' | Report | V.Amougui (yellow card) 58'; Bolohan (yellow card) 65' | Stadium: Malaya Sportivnaya Arena; Referee: Andrei Cojocaru |
Note: Match originally scheduled for 15 August, but postponed on 14 August due to Sheriff Tiraspol's UEFA Champions League Playoff round match against Dinamo Zagreb on 17 August.

| 5 March 2022 7 | Sheriff Tiraspol | 2–0 | Sfîntul Gheorghe | Tiraspol |
| EET (UTC+2) | Dulanto 37' (yellow card) 44'; Addo (yellow card) 66'; Traoré 77' | Report | M.İhekuna (yellow card) 35'; Osipov (yellow card) 59'; Paireli (yellow card) 60' | Stadium: Malaya Sportivnaya Arena; Referee: Andrei Breguta |
Note: Match originally scheduled for 21 August, but postponed on 20 August due to Sheriff Tiraspol's UEFA Champions League Playoff round matches against Dinamo Zagreb on 17 and 25 August.

| 13 March 2022 20 | Sheriff Tiraspol | 0–1 | Milsami Orhei | Tiraspol |
| 16:00 EET (UTC+2) | Bruno (yellow card) 18'; Khalid (yellow card) 63' (yellow-red card) 77' | Report | Zasavițchi (yellow card) 34'; Istrati 60'; Dedov (yellow card) 77' | Stadium: Malaya Sportivnaya Arena; Referee: Igor Boshka |

| 19 March 2022 21 | Sfîntul Gheorghe | 0–3 | Sheriff Tiraspol | Suruceni |
| 14:00 EET (UTC+2) | Svinarenco (yellow card) 40'; Ojog (yellow card) 88' | Report | Lushkja 62'; Bruno 74', 80' | Stadium: Suruceni Stadium; Referee: Roman Zhitari |

| 3 April 2022 22 | Bălți | 0–3 | Sheriff Tiraspol | Bălți |
| 17:00 EEST (UTC+3) | Prepeliță (yellow card) 72' | Report | Yansané 8'; Badolo 10'; Moussa Kyabou (yellow card) 12'; Pernambuco 90+2' | Stadium: Stadionul Orășenesc; Referee: Veaceslav Banar |

| 8 April 2022 23 | Sheriff Tiraspol | 1–0 | Petrocub Hîncești | Tiraspol |
| 18:00 EEST (UTC+3) | Athanasiadis (yellow card) 13'; Kiki 25'; Dulanto (yellow card) 58'; Traoré (yellow card) 85' | Report | Iurcu (yellow card) 13'; Revenco (yellow card) 57'; Mudrac (yellow card) 58' | Stadium: Malaya Sportivnaya Arena; Referee: Andrey Kozhocari |

| 16 April 2022 24 | Zimbru Chișinău | 1–1 | Sheriff Tiraspol | Chișinău |
| 18:00 EEST (UTC+3) | Pernambuco 16'; Badolo (yellow card) 27'; Yansané (yellow card) 50'; Radeljić (yellow card) 83' (yellow-red card) 90+2'; Athanasiadis (yellow card) 90+2' | Report | C.Mitsis (yellow card) 53'; Burghiu 80' | Stadium: Zimbru Stadium; Referee: Gennadiy Sidenko |

| 20 April 2022 25 | Sheriff Tiraspol | 3–0 | Florești | Tiraspol |
| EEST (UTC+3) | | | | Stadium: Malaya Sportivnaya Arena |
Note: Match awarded 3–0 to Sheriff Tiraspol after Florești were expelled from the league in January 2022.

| 29 April 2022 26 | Dinamo-Auto Tiraspol | 0–3 | Sheriff Tiraspol | Tîrnauca |
| 16:00 EEST (UTC+3) | V.Covcenco (yellow card) 18' | Report | Badolo 61'; Bruno 73' (yellow card) 74'; Kyabou (yellow card) 76'; Traoré 90+1' | Stadium: Dinamo-Auto Stadium; Referee: Yuri Kovtun |

| 7 May 2022 27 | Milsami Orhei | 1–1 | Sheriff Tiraspol | Orhei |
| 17:00 EEST (UTC+3) | Istrati 27' (pen.); Racu (yellow card) 90+3' | Report | Kiki (yellow card) 41'; Yansané 45+2'; Badolo (yellow card) 64'; Traoré (yellow card) 75'; Pernambuco (yellow card) 83' | Stadium: CSR Orhei; Referee: Denis Ivlev |

| 14 May 2022 28 | Sfîntul Gheorghe | 0–2 | Sheriff Tiraspol | Suruceni |
| 17:00 EEST (UTC+3) | N.Solodovnicov (yellow card) 39'; Lungu (yellow card) 43'; M.Ștefan (yellow card) 68'; Litveacov (yellow card) 72'; Ojog (yellow card) 89'; D.Lisu (yellow card) 90+1'; M.Railean (yellow card) 90+2' | Report | Lushkja (yellow card) 36' (goal) 90+2'; Evangelou (yellow card) 39'; Dulanto (yellow card) 49'; Kpozo (yellow card) 63'; Pernambuco 64' (pen.); Abalora (yellow card) 90' | Stadium: Suruceni Stadium; Referee: Ion Orlic |

=== Moldovan Cup ===
| 27 October 2021 Round of 16 | Sheriff Tiraspol | 6–0 | Saksan | Tiraspol |
| 15:00 EEST (UTC+3) | Castañeda 12'; Dago 22'; Khalid 26', 57'; Addo 45'; Cojocaru 60' | Report | | Stadium: Sheriff Stadium; Referee: Dumitru Muntean |

| 12 April 2022 Quarterfinal | Sheriff Tiraspol | 4–0 | Petrocub Hîncești | Tiraspol |
| 18:00 EEST (UTC+3) | Kyabou (yellow card) 7'; Pernambuco 15'; Badolo 23' (pen.), 83'; Guedes (yellow card) 68'; Bruno 84' | Report | I.Mostovei (yellow card) 22'; Potîrniche (yellow card) 24'; Ambros (yellow card) 45'; Sandu (yellow card) 60' | Stadium: Sheriff Stadium; Attendance: 320; Referee: Gabriel Tupicha |

| 26 April 2022 Semifinal | Dinamo-Auto Tiraspol | 2–3 | Sheriff Tiraspol | Tîrnauca |
| 19:00 EEST (UTC+3) | M.Bardîș (yellow card) 8'; Cemîrtan (yellow card) 19'; O.Bulat 45'; I.Chiperi (yellow card) 62'; Cojocari (yellow card) 72'; Bursuc 79' | Report | Badolo (penalty missed) 9' 9', 35'; Kiki (yellow card) 12'; Kyabou (yellow card) 34'; Pernambuco 41'; Dulanto (yellow card) 45+1'; Traoré (yellow card) 90+5' | Stadium: Dinamo-Auto Stadium; Attendance: 120; Referee: Dumitru Muntean |

==== Final ====
| 21 May 2022 | Sfîntul Gheorghe | 0–1 | Sheriff Tiraspol | Nisporeni |
| 20:00 EEST (UTC+3) | Ghecev (yellow card) 69'; Smirnov (yellow card) 69'; Suvorov (yellow card) 86' | Report | Badolo (yellow card) 62'; Traoré (yellow card) 77'; Lushkja 90+5' (yellow card) 90+5' | Stadium: Nisporeni Stadium; Attendance: 4,500; Referee: Igor Bosca |

=== Super Cup ===
| 26 June 2021 Final | Sfîntul Gheorghe | 2–2 (4–2 p) | Sheriff Tiraspol | Bălți |
| 20:00 EEST (UTC+3) | Svinarenco (yellow card) 52'; Sagna 55'; Litviacov 90+2' | Report | Dulanto (yellow card) 47'; Bizjak 53' (pen.); Fernando (yellow card) 54'; Belousov 84' | Stadium: Bălți Stadium; Attendance: 3,000; Referee: Petru Stoianov |
| | Penalties |
| | Slivca (penalty scored); Litviacov (penalty scored); Sagna (penalty scored); Suvorov (penalty scored) | | (penalty scored) Radeljić; (penalty missed) Petro; (penalty missed) Dulanto; (penalty scored) Bizjak |

=== UEFA Champions League ===
==== First qualifying round ====
| 7 July 2021 First leg | Teuta (Albania) | 0–4 | (Moldova) Sheriff Tiraspol | Durrës, Albania |
| 20:00 EEST (UTC+3) | Jackson (yellow card) 31'; Kallaku (yellow card) 54'; Aleksi (yellow card) 75' | Report | Luvannor 15', 45+1'; Traoré 56'; Yansané (yellow card) 60'; Castañeda 89' | Stadium: Niko Dovana Stadium; Attendance: 500; Referee: Amine Kourgheli (Belarus) |

| 13 July 2021 Second leg | Sheriff Tiraspol (Moldova) | 1–0 (5–0 agg.) | (Albania) Teuta | Tiraspol, Moldova |
| 20:00 EEST (UTC+3) | Traoré 6' | Report | Kotobelli (yellow card) 25' | Stadium: Sheriff Stadium; Attendance: 1,920; Referee: Morten Krogh (Denmark) |

==== Second qualifying round ====
| 20 July 2021 First leg | Alashkert (Armenia) | 0–1 | (Moldova) Sheriff Tiraspol | Yerevan, Armenia |
| 18:00 EEST (UTC+3) | James (yellow card) 17'; Khurtsidze (yellow card) 30' | Report | Luvannor 84' | Stadium: Vazgen Sargsyan Republican Stadium; Attendance: 5,800; Referee: Rade Obrenovič (Slovenia) |
Note: Match played at the Vazgen Sargsyan Republican Stadium in Yerevan, instead of Alashkert's regular stadium Alashkert Stadium, Yerevan, which did not meet UEFA requirements.

| 28 July 2021 Second leg | Sheriff Tiraspol (Moldova) | 3–1 (4–1 agg.) | (Armenia) Alashkert | Tiraspol, Moldova |
| 20:00 EEST (UTC+3) | Dulanto 15'; Luvannor 23'; Castañeda (yellow card) 67'; Thill 87' (pen.); Cristiano (yellow card) 90+1' | Report | Glišić 10' | Stadium: Sheriff Stadium; Attendance: 2,046; Referee: Bojan Pandžić (Sweden) |

==== Third qualifying round ====
| 3 August 2021 First leg | Red Star Belgrade (Serbia) | 1–1 | (Moldova) Sheriff Tiraspol | Belgrade, Serbia |
| 22:00 EEST (UTC+3) | Sanogo (yellow card) 26'; Kanga (yellow card) 32' (yellow-red card) 58'; Diony 45+1'; Krstičić (yellow card) 86'; Ivanić (yellow card) 90+5' | Report | Castañeda 33' (yellow card) 65'; Julien (yellow card) 72'; Dulanto (yellow card) 84'; Bizjak (yellow card) 90' | Stadium: Red Star Stadium; Attendance: 24,433; Referee: Ovidiu Haţegan (Romania) |

| 10 August 2021 Second leg | Sheriff Tiraspol (Moldova) | 1–0 (2–1 agg.) | (Serbia) Red Star Belgrade | Tiraspol, Moldova |
| 20:00 EEST (UTC+3) | Kolovos (yellow card) 27'; Cristiano (yellow card) 28'; Julien (yellow card) 30'; Castañeda (yellow card) 30'; Arboleda 45+2' | Report | Srnić (yellow card) 18'; Sanogo (yellow card) 45+4'; Rodić (yellow card) 64'; Gavrić (yellow card) 78' | Stadium: Sheriff Stadium; Attendance: 4,950; Referee: Felix Zwayer (Germany) |

==== Play-off round ====
| 17 August 2021 First leg | Sheriff Tiraspol (Moldova) | 3–0 | (Croatia) Dinamo Zagreb | Tiraspol, Moldova |
| 22:00 EEST (UTC+3) | Traoré 45', 80'; Kolovos 54' | Report | Menalo (yellow card) 76' | Stadium: Sheriff Stadium; Attendance: 5,281; Referee: Cüneyt Çakır (Turkey) |

| 25 August 2021 Second leg | Dinamo Zagreb (Croatia) | 0–0 (0–3 agg.) | (Moldova) Sheriff Tiraspol | Zagreb, Croatia |
| 22:00 EEST (UTC+3) | Ivanušec (yellow card) 89' | Report | Traoré (yellow card) 10'; Fernando (yellow card) 13'; Luvannor (yellow card) 85' | Stadium: Stadion Maksimir; Attendance: 8,015; Referee: Daniele Orsato (Italy) |

==== Group stage ====
| Pos | Team | Pld | W | D | L | GF | GA | GD | Pts | Qualification |
|---|---|---|---|---|---|---|---|---|---|---|
| 1 | (Spain) Real Madrid | 6 | 5 | 0 | 1 | 14 | 3 | +11 | 15 | Advance to knockout phase |
| 2 | (Italy) Inter Milan | 6 | 3 | 1 | 2 | 8 | 5 | +3 | 10 | Advance to knockout phase |
| 3 | (Moldova) Sheriff Tiraspol | 6 | 2 | 1 | 3 | 7 | 11 | −4 | 7 | Transfer to Europa League |
| 4 | (Ukraine) Shakhtar Donetsk | 6 | 0 | 2 | 4 | 2 | 12 | −10 | 2 | |

Source: UEFA
Rules for classification: Group stage tiebreakers

| 15 September 2021 1 | Sheriff Tiraspol (Moldova) | 2–0 | (Ukraine) Shakhtar Donetsk | Tiraspol, Moldova |
| 19:45 EEST (UTC+3) | Traoré 16'; Dulanto (yellow card) 42'; Yansané 62' | Report | | Stadium: Sheriff Stadium; Attendance: 5,205; Referee: Deniz Aytekin (Germany) |

| 28 September 2021 2 | Real Madrid (Spain) | 1–2 | (Moldova) Sheriff Tiraspol | Madrid, Spain |
| 22:00 EEST (UTC+3) | Casemiro (yellow card) 39'; Benzema 65' (pen.); Jović (yellow card) 81' | Report | Arboleda (yellow card) 17'; Yakhshiboev 25'; Addo (yellow card) 45'; Dulanto (yellow card) 46'; Thill 90', (yellow card) 90' | Stadium: Santiago Bernabéu; Attendance: 24,522; Referee: Lawrence Visser (Belgium) |

| 19 October 2021 3 | Inter Milan (Italy) | 3–1 | (Moldova) Sheriff Tiraspol | Milan, Italy |
| 22:00 EEST (UTC+3) | Džeko 34'; Dimarco (yellow card) 51'; Vidal 58'; De Vrij 67' | Report | Thill 52'; Cojocaru (yellow card) 88' | Stadium: San Siro; Attendance: 43,305; Referee: Danny Makkelie (Netherlands) |

| 3 November 2021 4 | Sheriff Tiraspol (Moldova) | 1–3 | (Italy) Inter Milan | Tiraspol, Moldova |
| 22:00 EET (UTC+2) | Addo (yellow card) 35'; Cristiano (yellow card) 51'; Kolovos (yellow card) 61'; Costanza (yellow card) 63'; Traoré 90+2' | Report | Darmian (yellow card) 43'; Brozović 54'; Škriniar 66', (yellow card) 67'; Sánchez 82' | Stadium: Sheriff Stadium; Attendance: 5,930; Referee: Felix Zwayer (Germany) |

| 24 November 2021 5 | Sheriff Tiraspol (Moldova) | 0–3 | (Spain) Real Madrid | Tiraspol, Moldova |
| 22:00 EET (UTC+2) | Costanza (yellow card) 29' | Report | Mendy (yellow card) 4'; Alaba 30'; Kroos 45+1'; Benzema 55' | Stadium: Sheriff Stadium; Attendance: 5,932; Referee: Szymon Marciniak (Poland) |

| 7 December 2021 6 | Shakhtar Donetsk (Ukraine) | 1–1 | (Moldova) Sheriff Tiraspol | Kyiv, Ukraine |
| 22:00 EET (UTC+2) | Fernando (yellow card) 10' (goal) 42'; Mudryk (yellow card) 78' | Report | Addo (yellow card) 18'; Dulanto (yellow card) 83'; Nikolov 90+3' | Stadium: NSC Olimpiyskiy; Referee: Donatas Rumšas (Lithuania) |
Note: Shakhtar Donetsk played their home matches at NSC Olimpiyskiy, Kyiv, instead of their regular stadium Donbas Arena, Donetsk, due to the War in Donbas.

=== UEFA Europa League ===
==== Knockout round play-off ====
| 17 February 2022 First leg | Sheriff Tiraspol (Moldova) | 2–0 | (Portugal) Braga | Tiraspol, Moldova |
| 19:45 EET (UTC+2) | Petro (yellow card) 15'; Thill 43' (pen.); Traoré 83' | Report | | Stadium: Sheriff Stadium; Attendance: 3,062; Referee: Danny Makkelie (Netherlands) |

| 24 February 2022 Second leg | Braga (Portugal) | 2–0 (a.e.t.) (2–2 agg.) (3–2 p) | (Moldova) Sheriff Tiraspol | Braga, Portugal |
| 22:00 EET (UTC+2) | Medeiros 17'; R. Horta 43'; Vitinha (yellow card) 69'; Moura (yellow card) 85' | Report | Traoré (yellow card) 21'; Petro (yellow card) 66'; Nikolov (yellow card) 85'; Thill (yellow card) 88'; Yakhshiboev (yellow card) 90+4'; Dulanto (yellow card) 114' | Stadium: Estádio Municipal; Attendance: 9,423; Referee: José María Sánchez Martínez (Spain) |
| | Penalties |
| | R. Horta (penalty scored); Musrati (penalty scored); Ruiz (penalty missed); Carmo (penalty missed); Moura (penalty scored) | | (penalty missed) Dulanto; (penalty missed) Bruno; (penalty missed) Radeljić; (penalty scored) Khalid; (penalty scored) Thill |

== Squad statistics ==
As of match played 22 May 2022

=== Appearances and goals ===
| No. | Pos | Nat | Player | Total | | Divizia Națională | | Moldovan Cup | | Super Cup | | Champions League | | Europa League | |
| No. | Pos | Nat | Player | Apps | Goals | Apps | Goals | Apps | Goals | Apps | Goals | Apps | Goals | Apps | Goals |
|---|---|---|---|---|---|---|---|---|---|---|---|---|---|---|---|
| 1 | GK | (Moldova) MDA | Dumitru Celeadnic | 4 | 0 | 3 | 0 | 0 | 0 | 0 | 0 | 1 | 0 | 0 | 0 |
| 2 | DF | (Ghana) GHA | Patrick Kpozo | 6 | 0 | 3+1 | 0 | 1+1 | 0 | 0 | 0 | 0 | 0 | 0 | 0 |
| 3 | DF | (Malawi) MAW | Charles Petro | 23 | 1 | 9+5 | 1 | 2+1 | 0 | 0+1 | 0 | 0+3 | 0 | 2 | 0 |
| 6 | DF | (Bosnia and Herzegovina) BIH | Stjepan Radeljić | 31 | 2 | 15+4 | 2 | 2 | 0 | 1 | 0 | 0+7 | 0 | 2 | 0 |
| 7 | FW | (Ghana) GHA | Basit Khalid | 19 | 7 | 7+9 | 5 | 1 | 2 | 0 | 0 | 0 | 0 | 0+2 | 0 |
| 9 | FW | (Mali) MLI | Adama Traoré | 43 | 15 | 20+3 | 8 | 3 | 0 | 0+1 | 0 | 14 | 6 | 2 | 1 |
| 12 | MF | (Niger) NIG | Abdoul Moumouni | 5 | 0 | 1+3 | 0 | 0+1 | 0 | 0 | 0 | 0 | 0 | 0 | 0 |
| 15 | DF | (Cameroon) CMR | Gaby Kiki | 10 | 1 | 8 | 1 | 2 | 0 | 0 | 0 | 0 | 0 | 0 | 0 |
| 16 | DF | (Trinidad and Tobago) TTO | Keston Julien | 33 | 0 | 14+4 | 0 | 3 | 0 | 0 | 0 | 7+3 | 0 | 2 | 0 |
| 17 | FW | (Uzbekistan) UZB | Jasurbek Yakhshiboev | 12 | 2 | 3+3 | 1 | 0+1 | 0 | 0 | 0 | 3 | 1 | 2 | 0 |
| 18 | MF | (Mali) MLI | Moussa Kyabou | 17 | 0 | 7+3 | 0 | 3 | 0 | 0 | 0 | 3 | 0 | 0+1 | 0 |
| 19 | MF | (Moldova) MDA | Serafim Cojocari | 5 | 0 | 0+2 | 0 | 0+1 | 0 | 0 | 0 | 0+1 | 0 | 0+1 | 0 |
| 20 | MF | (North Macedonia) MKD | Boban Nikolov | 22 | 4 | 5+9 | 3 | 0+1 | 0 | 0 | 0 | 0+5 | 1 | 1+1 | 0 |
| 21 | MF | (Ghana) GHA | Edmund Addo | 33 | 1 | 14+4 | 0 | 2 | 1 | 0 | 0 | 12 | 0 | 1 | 0 |
| 22 | MF | (Albania) ALB | Regi Lushkja | 9 | 3 | 2+5 | 2 | 1+1 | 1 | 0 | 0 | 0 | 0 | 0 | 0 |
| 23 | FW | (Kazakhstan) KAZ | Danil Ankudinov | 4 | 0 | 0+3 | 0 | 0+1 | 0 | 0 | 0 | 0 | 0 | 0 | 0 |
| 28 | FW | (Brazil) BRA | Pernambuco | 13 | 5 | 6+4 | 3 | 3 | 2 | 0 | 0 | 0 | 0 | 0 | 0 |
| 30 | GK | (Greece) GRE | Giorgos Athanasiadis | 35 | 0 | 17 | 0 | 2 | 0 | 1 | 0 | 13 | 0 | 2 | 0 |
| 31 | MF | (Luxembourg) LUX | Sébastien Thill | 40 | 10 | 20+2 | 6 | 1 | 0 | 1 | 0 | 14 | 3 | 2 | 1 |
| 40 | GK | (Ghana) GHA | Razak Abalora | 6 | 0 | 4 | 0 | 1+1 | 0 | 0 | 0 | 0 | 0 | 0 | 0 |
| 41 | DF | (Greece) GRE | Stefanos Evangelou | 9 | 0 | 1+5 | 0 | 2 | 0 | 0 | 0 | 0 | 0 | 1 | 0 |
| 42 | DF | (Brazil) BRA | Renan Guedes | 10 | 0 | 7+1 | 0 | 1+1 | 0 | 0 | 0 | 0 | 0 | 0 | 0 |
| 55 | DF | (Peru) PER | Gustavo Dulanto | 41 | 2 | 18+4 | 1 | 3 | 0 | 1 | 0 | 14 | 1 | 1 | 0 |
| 77 | MF | (Brazil) BRA | Bruno | 29 | 6 | 16+2 | 5 | 3 | 1 | 0 | 0 | 3+3 | 0 | 2 | 0 |
| 88 | MF | (Burkina Faso) BFA | Cedric Badolo | 12 | 6 | 8+1 | 2 | 3 | 4 | 0 | 0 | 0 | 0 | 0 | 0 |
| 99 | FW | (Guinea) GUI | Momo Yansané | 30 | 12 | 13+3 | 11 | 0+2 | 0 | 0 | 0 | 3+7 | 1 | 2 | 0 |
Players away on loan:
| 8 | DF | (Moldova) MDA | Alexandr Belousov | 7 | 1 | 3 | 0 | 0+1 | 0 | 0+1 | 1 | 0+1 | 0 | 0+1 | 0 |
| 17 | MF | (Colombia) COL | Hansel Zapata | 6 | 0 | 2+1 | 0 | 0 | 0 | 0 | 0 | 0+3 | 0 | 0 | 0 |
Players who left Sheriff Tiraspol during the season:
| 2 | DF | (Colombia) COL | Danilo Arboleda | 32 | 4 | 15+2 | 3 | 0 | 0 | 1 | 0 | 14 | 1 | 0 | 0 |
| 10 | FW | (Colombia) COL | Frank Castañeda | 31 | 9 | 9+8 | 6 | 1 | 1 | 1 | 0 | 12 | 2 | 0 | 0 |
| 11 | FW | (Slovenia) SLO | Lovro Bizjak | 11 | 3 | 2+1 | 2 | 0 | 0 | 1 | 1 | 0+7 | 0 | 0 | 0 |
| 13 | DF | (Brazil) BRA | Fernando | 25 | 1 | 13+1 | 1 | 1 | 0 | 1 | 0 | 7+2 | 0 | 0 | 0 |
| 15 | DF | (Brazil) BRA | Cristiano | 27 | 0 | 10+1 | 0 | 0+1 | 0 | 1 | 0 | 14 | 0 | 0 | 0 |
| 22 | MF | (Greece) GRE | Dimitris Kolovos | 22 | 4 | 12 | 3 | 0 | 0 | 0 | 0 | 10 | 1 | 0 | 0 |
| 23 | FW | (Ivory Coast) CIV | Nadrey Dago | 20 | 5 | 5+10 | 4 | 1 | 1 | 1 | 0 | 2+1 | 0 | 0 | 0 |
| 26 | GK | (Serbia) SRB | Dušan Marković | 4 | 0 | 3 | 0 | 1 | 0 | 0 | 0 | 0 | 0 | 0 | 0 |
| 27 | FW | (Malawi) MAW | Peter Banda | 5 | 0 | 0+1 | 0 | 0 | 0 | 0+1 | 0 | 1+2 | 0 | 0 | 0 |
| 70 | FW | (Moldova) MDA | Henrique Luvannor | 9 | 5 | 1+1 | 1 | 0 | 0 | 0 | 0 | 7 | 4 | 0 | 0 |
| 90 | DF | (Moldova) MDA | Veaceslav Posmac | 2 | 0 | 1 | 0 | 0 | 0 | 1 | 0 | 0 | 0 | 0 | 0 |
| 98 | MF | (Moldova) MDA | Maxim Cojocaru | 6 | 2 | 0+3 | 1 | 1 | 1 | 0 | 0 | 0+2 | 0 | 0 | 0 |

=== Goal scorers ===
| Place | Position | Nation | Number | Name | Divizia Națională | Moldovan Cup | Super Cup | Champions League | Europa League | Total |
|---|---|---|---|---|---|---|---|---|---|---|
| 1 | MF | (Mali) | 9 | Adama Traoré | 8 | 0 | 0 | 6 | 1 | 15 |
| 2 | FW | (Guinea) | 99 | Momo Yansané | 11 | 0 | 0 | 1 | 0 | 12 |
| 3 | MF | (Luxembourg) | 31 | Sébastien Thill | 6 | 0 | 0 | 3 | 1 | 10 |
| 4 | FW | (Colombia) | 10 | Frank Castañeda | 6 | 1 | 0 | 2 | 0 | 9 |
| 5 | FW | (Ghana) | 7 | Basit Khalid | 5 | 2 | 0 | 0 | 0 | 7 |
| 6 | MF | (Brazil) | 77 | Bruno | 5 | 1 | 0 | 0 | 0 | 6 |
| 6 | MF | (Burkina Faso) | 88 | Cedric Badolo | 2 | 4 | 0 | 0 | 0 | 6 |
| 8 | FW | (Ivory Coast) | 23 | Nadrey Dago | 4 | 1 | 0 | 0 | 0 | 5 |
| 8 | FW | (Brazil) | 28 | Pernambuco | 3 | 2 | 0 | 0 | 0 | 5 |
| 8 | FW | (Moldova) | 70 | Henrique Luvannor | 1 | 0 | 0 | 4 | 0 | 5 |
| 11 | DF | (Colombia) | 2 | Danilo Arboleda | 3 | 0 | 0 | 1 | 0 | 4 |
| 11 | MF | (Greece) | 22 | Dimitris Kolovos | 3 | 0 | 0 | 1 | 0 | 4 |
| 11 | MF | (North Macedonia) | 20 | Boban Nikolov | 3 | 0 | 0 | 1 | 0 | 4 |
| 14 | MF | (Albania) | 22 | Regi Lushkja | 2 | 1 | 0 | 0 | 0 | 3 |
| 14 | FW | (Slovenia) | 11 | Lovro Bizjak | 2 | 0 | 1 | 0 | 0 | 3 |
| 16 | DF | (Bosnia and Herzegovina) | 6 | Stjepan Radeljić | 2 | 0 | 0 | 0 | 0 | 2 |
| 16 | MF | (Moldova) | 98 | Maxim Cojocaru | 1 | 1 | 0 | 0 | 0 | 2 |
| 16 | MF | (Uzbekistan) | 17 | Jasurbek Yakhshiboev | 1 | 0 | 0 | 1 | 0 | 2 |
| 16 | DF | (Peru) | 55 | Gustavo Dulanto | 1 | 0 | 0 | 1 | 0 | 2 |
| 20 | DF | (Malawi) | 3 | Charles Petro | 1 | 0 | 0 | 0 | 0 | 1 |
| 20 | DF | (Brazil) | 13 | Fernando | 1 | 0 | 0 | 0 | 0 | 1 |
| 20 | DF | (Cameroon) | 15 | Gaby Kiki | 1 | 0 | 0 | 0 | 0 | 1 |
| 20 | MF | (Ghana) | 21 | Edmund Addo | 0 | 1 | 0 | 0 | 0 | 1 |
| 20 | DF | (Moldova) | 8 | Alexandr Belousov | 0 | 0 | 1 | 0 | 0 | 1 |
| | | | | Awarded | 3 | 0 | 0 | 0 | 0 | 3 |
| | | | | TOTALS | 75 | 14 | 2 | 21 | 2 | 114 |

=== Clean sheets ===
| Place | Position | Nation | Number | Name | Divizia Națională | Moldovan Cup | Super Cup | Champions League | Europa League | Total |
|---|---|---|---|---|---|---|---|---|---|---|
| 1 | GK | (Greece) | 30 | Giorgos Athanasiadis | 13 | 1 | 0 | 7 | 1 | 22 |
| 2 | GK | (Ghana) | 40 | Razak Abalora | 3 | 1 | 0 | 0 | 0 | 4 |
| 2 | GK | (Serbia) | 26 | Dušan Marković | 2 | 1 | 0 | 0 | 0 | 3 |
| | | | | TOTALS | 18 | 3 | 0 | 7 | 1 | 29 |

=== Disciplinary record ===
| Number | Nation | Position | Name | Divizia Națională | | Moldovan Cup | | Super Cup | | Champions League | | Europa League | | Total | |
| Number | Nation | Position | Name | Booked | Sent off (straight red) | Booked | Sent off (straight red) | Booked | Sent off (straight red) | Booked | Sent off (straight red) | Booked | Sent off (straight red) | Booked | Sent off (straight red) |
| 2 | (Ghana) | MF | Patrick Kpozo | 1 | 0 | 0 | 0 | 0 | 0 | 0 | 0 | 0 | 0 | 1 | 0 |
| 3 | (Malawi) | DF | Charles Petro | 0 | 0 | 0 | 0 | 0 | 0 | 0 | 0 | 2 | 0 | 2 | 0 |
| 6 | (Bosnia and Herzegovina) | DF | Stjepan Radeljić | 2 | 1 | 0 | 0 | 0 | 0 | 0 | 0 | 0 | 0 | 2 | 1 |
| 7 | (Ghana) | FW | Basit Khalid | 2 | 1 | 0 | 0 | 0 | 0 | 0 | 0 | 0 | 0 | 2 | 1 |
| 9 | (Mali) | MF | Adama Traoré | 4 | 0 | 2 | 0 | 0 | 0 | 1 | 0 | 1 | 0 | 8 | 0 |
| 15 | (Cameroon) | DF | Gaby Kiki | 1 | 0 | 1 | 0 | 0 | 0 | 0 | 0 | 0 | 0 | 2 | 0 |
| 16 | (Trinidad and Tobago) | DF | Keston Julien | 1 | 0 | 0 | 0 | 0 | 0 | 2 | 0 | 0 | 0 | 3 | 0 |
| 17 | (Uzbekistan) | FW | Jasurbek Yakhshiboev | 0 | 0 | 0 | 0 | 0 | 0 | 0 | 0 | 1 | 0 | 1 | 0 |
| 18 | (Mali) | MF | Moussa Kyabou | 2 | 0 | 2 | 0 | 0 | 0 | 0 | 0 | 0 | 0 | 4 | 0 |
| 20 | (North Macedonia) | MF | Boban Nikolov | 2 | 0 | 0 | 0 | 0 | 0 | 0 | 0 | 1 | 0 | 3 | 0 |
| 21 | (Ghana) | MF | Edmund Addo | 3 | 1 | 0 | 0 | 0 | 0 | 3 | 0 | 0 | 0 | 6 | 1 |
| 22 | (Albania) | MF | Regi Lushkja | 1 | 0 | 1 | 0 | 0 | 0 | 0 | 0 | 0 | 0 | 2 | 0 |
| 28 | (Brazil) | FW | Pernambuco | 1 | 0 | 0 | 0 | 0 | 0 | 0 | 0 | 0 | 0 | 1 | 0 |
| 30 | (Greece) | GK | Giorgos Athanasiadis | 3 | 0 | 0 | 0 | 0 | 0 | 0 | 0 | 0 | 0 | 3 | 0 |
| 31 | (Luxembourg) | MF | Sébastien Thill | 1 | 0 | 0 | 0 | 0 | 0 | 1 | 0 | 1 | 0 | 3 | 0 |
| 40 | (Ghana) | GK | Razak Abalora | 1 | 0 | 0 | 0 | 0 | 0 | 0 | 0 | 0 | 0 | 1 | 0 |
| 41 | (Greece) | DF | Stefanos Evangelou | 2 | 0 | 0 | 0 | 0 | 0 | 0 | 0 | 0 | 0 | 2 | 0 |
| 42 | (Brazil) | DF | Renan Guedes | 0 | 0 | 1 | 0 | 0 | 0 | 0 | 0 | 0 | 0 | 1 | 0 |
| 55 | (Peru) | DF | Gustavo Dulanto | 7 | 0 | 1 | 0 | 1 | 0 | 4 | 0 | 1 | 0 | 14 | 0 |
| 77 | (Brazil) | MF | Bruno | 3 | 0 | 0 | 0 | 0 | 0 | 0 | 0 | 0 | 0 | 3 | 0 |
| 88 | (Burkina Faso) | MF | Cedric Badolo | 3 | 0 | 1 | 0 | 0 | 0 | 0 | 0 | 0 | 0 | 4 | 0 |
| 99 | (Guinea) | FW | Momo Yansané | 1 | 0 | 0 | 0 | 0 | 0 | 1 | 0 | 0 | 0 | 2 | 0 |
Players away on loan:
| 8 | (Moldova) | DF | Alexandr Belousov | 1 | 0 | 0 | 0 | 0 | 0 | 0 | 0 | 0 | 0 | 1 | 0 |
Players who left Sheriff Tiraspol during the season:
| 2 | (Colombia) | DF | Danilo Arboleda | 2 | 0 | 0 | 0 | 0 | 0 | 1 | 0 | 0 | 0 | 3 | 0 |
| 6 | (Bosnia and Herzegovina) | DF | Stjepan Radeljić | 1 | 0 | 0 | 0 | 0 | 0 | 0 | 0 | 0 | 0 | 1 | 0 |
| 10 | (Colombia) | FW | Frank Castañeda | 0 | 0 | 0 | 0 | 0 | 0 | 3 | 0 | 0 | 0 | 3 | 0 |
| 11 | (Slovenia) | FW | Lovro Bizjak | 0 | 0 | 0 | 0 | 0 | 0 | 1 | 0 | 0 | 0 | 1 | 0 |
| 13 | (Brazil) | DF | Fernando | 3 | 0 | 0 | 0 | 1 | 0 | 3 | 0 | 0 | 0 | 7 | 0 |
| 15 | (Brazil) | DF | Cristiano | 3 | 0 | 0 | 0 | 0 | 0 | 3 | 0 | 0 | 0 | 6 | 0 |
| 22 | (Greece) | MF | Dimitris Kolovos | 1 | 0 | 0 | 0 | 0 | 0 | 2 | 0 | 0 | 0 | 3 | 0 |
| 23 | (Ivory Coast) | FW | Nadrey Dago | 2 | 0 | 0 | 0 | 0 | 0 | 0 | 0 | 0 | 0 | 2 | 0 |
| 70 | (Moldova) | FW | Henrique Luvannor | 0 | 0 | 0 | 0 | 0 | 0 | 1 | 0 | 0 | 0 | 1 | 0 |
| 98 | (Moldova) | MF | Maxim Cojocaru | 0 | 0 | 0 | 0 | 0 | 0 | 1 | 0 | 0 | 0 | 1 | 0 |
| | | | TOTALS | 54 | 3 | 9 | 0 | 2 | 0 | 27 | 0 | 7 | 0 | 99 | 3 |
