= 2021 Moldovan Super Cup =

Supercupa Moldovei
Sfîntul Gheorghe	Sheriff Tiraspol
2	2
- Sfîntul Gheorghe won 4–2 on penalties
- Date: 26 June 2021
- Venue: Bălți Stadium, Bălți
- Referee: Petru Stoianov
- Attendance: 3,000

The 2021 Moldovan Super Cup was the 12th Moldovan Super Cup (Romanian: Supercupa Moldovei), an annual Moldovan football match played by the winner of the national football league (the National Division) and the winner of the national Cup. The match was played between Sfîntul Gheorghe, winners of the 2020–21 Moldovan Cup, and Sheriff Tiraspol, champions of the 2020–21 National Division. It was held at the Bălți Stadium on 26 June 2021.
Sfîntul Gheorghe won 4–2 on penalties, after the match finished 2–2 after 90 minutes.

== Match ==
26 June 2021
20:00 EEST

Sfîntul Gheorghe	2–2	Sheriff Tiraspol
Sagna 55'; Litveacov 90+2'	Report	Bizjak 53' (pen.); Belousov 84'
Penalties
Slivca (penalty scored); Litveacov (penalty scored); Sagna (penalty scored); Suvorov (penalty scored)	4–2	(penalty scored) Radeljić; (penalty missed) Petro; (penalty missed) Dulanto; (penalty scored) Bizjak

Bălți Stadium, Bălți
Attendance: 3,000
Referee: Petru Stoianov

Sf. Gheorghe	Sheriff

GK	1	(Moldova) Maxim Railean
DF	3	(Moldova) Mihail Ștefan
DF	4	(Moldova) Artiom Litveacov
DF	17	(Moldova) Petru Ojog
DF	19	(Moldova) Serghei Svinarenco	(yellow card) 52'
DF	24	(Senegal) Sidy Sagna
MF	13	(Moldova) Teodor Lungu (c)	(substituted off) 85'
MF	14	(Nigeria) Aliyu Adam	(substituted off) 85'
MF	98	(Moldova) Victor Stînă	(substituted off) 73'
FW	9	(Belarus) Roman Volkov	(substituted off) 81'
FW	11	(Moldova) Mihail Ghecev	(substituted off) 73'
Substitutes:
GK	33	(Moldova) Marius Marițoi
DF	16	(Moldova) Ion Borș
MF	5	(Moldova) Vitalie Plămădeală	(substituted on) 73'
MF	7	(Moldova) Alexandru Suvorov	(substituted on) 85'
MF	8	(Moldova) Alexandru Osipov	(substituted on) 73'
MF	10	(Moldova) Artiom Carastoian
MF	21	(Moldova) Eugen Slivca	(substituted on) 85'
FW	88	(Moldova) Nicolai Solodovnicov	(substituted on) 81'
Manager:
(Moldova) Serghei Cebotari

GK	30	(Greece) Giorgos Athanasiadis
DF	2	(Colombia) Danilo Arboleda
DF	6	(Bosnia and Herzegovina) Stjepan Radeljić
DF	15	(Brazil) Cris Silva
DF	55	(Peru) Gustavo Dulanto	(yellow card) 47'
MF	13	(Brazil) Fernando Costanza	(yellow card) 54'	(substituted off) 62'
MF	23	(Ivory Coast) Nadrey Dago	(substituted off) 81'
MF	31	(Luxembourg) Sébastien Thill	(substituted off) 87'
MF	90	(Moldova) Veaceslav Posmac
FW	10	(Colombia) Frank Castañeda (c)	(substituted off) 46'
FW	11	(Slovenia) Lovro Bizjak
Substitutions:
GK	1	(Moldova) Dumitru Celeadnic
GK	26	(Serbia) Dušan Marković
GK	33	(Moldova) Serghei Pașcenco
DF	3	(Malawi) Charles Petro	(substituted on) 87'
DF	16	(Trinidad and Tobago) Keston Julien
MF	8	(Moldova) Alexandr Belousov	(substituted on) 62'
MF	98	(Moldova) Maxim Cojocaru
FW	9	(Mali) Adama Traoré	(substituted on) 46'
FW	27	(Malawi) Peter Banda	(substituted on) 81'
Manager:
(Ukraine) Yuriy Vernydub

Assistant referees:
Vladislav Lifciu
Vadim Vicol
Additional assistant referees:
Andrei Cojocaru
Denis Ivlev
Fourth official:
Anatolie Basiul

Match rules

- 90 minutes.
- Penalty shoot-out if score is still level.
- Eleven named substitutes, of which up to five may be used. (Note: Each team was given only three opportunities to make substitutions, excluding substitutions made at half-time.)
