= Stefanos Evangelou =

Greek footballer (born 1998)

Personal information
- Date of birth: 12 May 1998 (age 28)
- Place of birth: Athens, Greece
- Height: 1.85 m (6 ft 1 in)
- Position: Centre-back

Team information
- Current team: Anagennisi Karditsa
- Number: 41

Youth career
- 2009–2015: Panionios
- 2015–2016: Panathinaikos

Senior career*
Years	Team	Apps	(Gls)
2016–2018	Panathinaikos	10	(0)
2018–2020	Olympiacos	0	(0)
2018–2019	→ PAS Giannina (loan)	1	(0)
2019–2020	→ Panionios (loan)	18	(0)
2020–2021	Górnik Zabrze	9	(0)
2021–2023	Sheriff Tiraspol	10	(0)
2023–2024	Osijek	4	(0)
2023–2024	→ Zalaegerszegi (loan)	23	(1)
2024–2025	Zalaegerszeg	26	(0)
2025–2026	Nyíregyháza	10	(2)
2026	Aluminij	9	(0)
2026–	Anagennisi Karditsa	0	(0)

International career
2014	Greece U16	2	(0)
2014–2015	Greece U17	14	(0)
2015–2017	Greece U19	15	(0)
2017–2020	Greece U21	15	(0)
- * Club domestic league appearances and goals as of 9 May 2026

Stefanos Evangelou (Greek: Στέφανος Ευαγγέλου; born 12 May 1998) is a Greek professional footballer who plays as a centre-back for Super League 2 club Anagennisi Karditsa.

== Career ==
Evangelou plays mainly as a centre-back and joined Panathinaikos from Panionios in the summer of 2015. In January 2017, he made his debut with the club in a Greek Cup match against Kissamikos.

On 5 October 2020, Evangelou signed with Górnik Zabrze for two years, with a two-year option, for an undisclosed fee. On 8 September 2021, he left the club by mutual consent.

On 3 July 2025, he signed a two-year contract with Hungarian club Nyíregyháza Spartacus FC. He joins them for an undisclosed fee.

=== Sheriff Tiraspol ===
In 2021 he moved to Sheriff Tiraspol in Moldova. In his first season with the club, he won the 2021–22 Moldovan National Division and the 2021–22 Moldovan Cup.

== Career statistics ==
=== Club ===
As of 15 July 2023

Club	Season	League			Cup		Continental		Other		Total	
Club	Season	Division	Apps	Goals	Apps	Goals	Apps	Goals	Apps	Goals	Apps	Goals
Panathinaikos	2016–17	Super League Greece	8	0	4	0	0	0	—		12	0
Panathinaikos	2017–18	Super League Greece	2	0	1	0	0	0	—		3	0
Panathinaikos	Total		10	0	5	0	0	0	—		15	0
PAS Giannina (loan)	2018–19	Super League Greece	1	0	4	0	—		—		5	0
Panionios (loan)	2019–20	Super League Greece	18	0	1	0	—		—		19	0
Górnik Zabrze	2020–21	Ekstraklasa	9	0	2	1	0	0	—		11	1
Sheriff Tiraspol	2021–22	Moldovan National Division	6	0	2	0	1	0	—		9	0
Sheriff Tiraspol	2022–23	Moldovan National Division	4	0	0	0	3	0	—		7	0
Sheriff Tiraspol	Total		10	0	2	0	4	0	—		16	0
Nyíregyháza	2025–26	Nemzeti Bajnokság I	0	0	—		—		0	0		
Career total			48	0	14	1	4	0	0	0	66	1

== Honours ==
Sheriff Tiraspol

- Moldovan National Division: 2021–22
- Moldovan Cup: 2021–22
