= Edmund Addo =

Ghanaian footballer (born 2000)

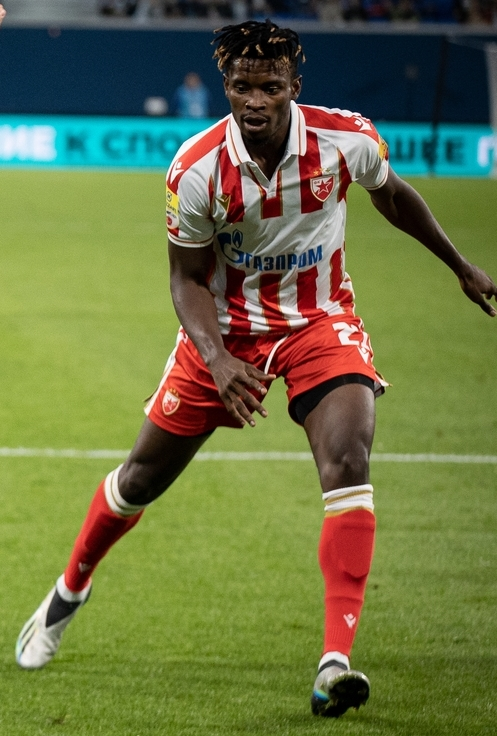
- Addo with Red Star Belgrade in 2023

Personal information
- Date of birth: 17 May 2000 (age 26)
- Place of birth: Chorkor, Accra, Ghana
- Height: 1.78 m (5 ft 10 in)
- Position: Midfielder

Team information
- Current team: OFK Beograd
- Number: 3

Youth career
- −2018: Mighty Cosmos
- 2018−2019: Senica

Senior career*
Years	Team	Apps	(Gls)
2018−2021	Senica	47	(2)
2021−2023	Sheriff Tiraspol	18	(0)
2023	Spartak Subotica	16	(0)
2023−	Red Star Belgrade	0	(0)
2024	→ Radnički Niš (loan)	15	(0)
2024–	→ OFK Beograd (loan)	47	(0)

International career^{‡}
2021–	Ghana	10	(0)
- * Club domestic league appearances and goals as of 21 July 2026 ‡ National team caps and goals as of 8 July 2023

Edmund Addo (born 17 May 2000) is a Ghanaian professional footballer who plays as a midfielder for Serbian SuperLiga club OFK Beograd on loan from Red Star Belgrade.

== Club career ==
=== Senica ===
Addo made his Fortuna Liga debut for Senica against AS Trenčín on 16 February 2019. Addo was fielded as a late replacement for Eric Ramírez, in an effort to salvage something out of this away fixture played in Myjava. Senica was two down after goals by Čataković and Ubbink but Paur had struck a third goal, finalising the score of the match to 3–0.

=== Sheriff Tiraspol ===
On 14 July 2021, Sheriff Tiraspol announced the signing of Addo. In his first season, he played 34 matches including six in the UEFA Champions League and one in the Europa League as Sheriff won the double, the Moldovan National Division and the Moldovan Cup.

=== Spartak Subotica ===
Following speculation on his possible transfer to Red Star Belgrade, on 10 January 2023 Addo joined fellow Serbian side Spartak Subotica, signing a contract until June 2025 with the club.

== International career ==
Addo made his debut for Ghana national team on 11 November 2021 in a World Cup qualifier against Ethiopia. He was part of the final 28-man squad named for the 2021 African Cup of Nations (AFCON) in Cameroon.

== Career statistics ==
As of 15 December 2025

Appearances and goals by club, season and competition
Club	Season	League			Cup		Continental		Other		Total	
Club	Season	Division	Apps	Goals	Apps	Goals	Apps	Goals	Apps	Goals	Apps	Goals
Senica	2018–19	Slovak First Football League	2	0	1	0	—		—		3	0
Senica	2019–20	Slovak First Football League	17	0	2	0	—		—		19	0
Senica	2020–21	Slovak First Football League	28	2	1	1	—		2	0	31	3
Senica	Total		47	2	4	1	—		2	0	53	3
Sheriff Tiraspol	2021–22	Moldovan National Division	18	0	2	1	13	0	0	0	33	1
Sheriff Tiraspol	2022–23	Moldovan National Division	0	0	0	0	0	0	—		0	0
Sheriff Tiraspol	Total		18	0	2	1	13	0	0	0	33	1
Spartak Subotica	2022–23	Serbian SuperLiga	16	0	0	0	—		—		16	0
Red Star Belgrade	2023–24	Serbian SuperLiga	0	0	0	0	—		—		0	0
Radnički Niš (loan)	2023–24	Serbian SuperLiga	15	0	0	0	—		—		15	0
OFK Beograd (loan)	2024–25	Serbian SuperLiga	26	0	0	0	—		—		26	0
OFK Beograd (loan)	2025–26	Serbian SuperLiga	10	0	0	0	—		—		10	0
OFK Beograd (loan)	Total		36	0	0	0	—		—		36	0
Career total			132	2	6	2	13	0	2	0	153	4

== Honours ==
Sheriff Tiraspol

- Moldovan National Division: 2021–22
- Moldovan Cup: 2021–22
