= Pernambuco (footballer) =

Brazilian footballer

Personal information
- Full name: José Vitor Rodrigues da Silva dos Santos
- Date of birth: 28 April 1998 (age 28)
- Place of birth: Ilha de Itamaracá, Brazil
- Height: 1.87 m (6 ft 2 in)
- Position: Winger

Team information
- Current team: Selangor
- Number: 98

Youth career
- Portuguesa

Senior career*
Years	Team	Apps	(Gls)
2018	Portuguesa	2	(0)
2018	Jaguariúna	1	(0)
2019–2023	Lviv	30	(3)
2020	→ Dinamo Tbilisi (loan)	14	(2)
2021	→ Bodø/Glimt (loan)	8	(0)
2022	→ Sheriff Tiraspol (loan)	20	(4)
2023	Kyzylzhar	8	(4)
2023–2024	Diósgyőr	13	(2)
2024	Al Dhafra	1	(1)
2025	Juventude	5	(0)
2025–2026	Operário Ferroviário	6	(0)
2026	Ponte Preta	2	(0)
2026–	Selangor	0	(0)
- * Club domestic league appearances and goals as of 31 January 2026

José Vitor Rodrigues da Silva dos Santos (born 28 April 1998), commonly known as Pernambuco, is a Brazilian footballer who plays as a winger for Malaysia Super League club Selangor.

== Career ==
=== Early career ===
Pernambuco started his youth career with Portuguesa. He made his professional debut with them. He also played for Jaguariúna in Serie D.

=== Lviv ===
Pernambuco made his Ukrainian Premier League debut for Lviv on 23 February 2019 in a game against FC Chornomorets Odesa.

==== Dinamo Tbilisi ====
On 20 February 2020, Pernambuco joined Dinamo Tbilisi on a one-year loan, with the option of joining permanently.

==== Bodø/Glimt ====
On 27 March 2021, he signed a loan deal with Norwegian club Bodø/Glimt. He could not join the club immediately due to Norway's closed borders as a preventative measure for the COVID-19 pandemic in the country. After one month, Pernambuco was granted permission to enter Norway, but a positive coronavirus test meant he could not leave Brazil and had to stay in isolation. He finally joined Bodø/Glimt on 28 May 2021. He made his Eliteserien debut for the club in a 2–0 win against Mjøndalen on 13 June 2021, coming on as a substitute in the 90th minute.

==== Sheriff Tiraspol ====
On 15 January 2022, Pernambuco joined Moldovan club Sheriff Tiraspol on loan.

==== Kyzylzhar ====
In early 2023, Pernambuco joined Kazakhstan Premier League club Kyzylzhar on loan, until 23 June 2023.

=== Diósgyőri ===
On 17 August 2023, Pernambuco joined Hungarian club Diósgyőri.

== Career statistics ==
As of match played 29 September 2023

Appearances and goals by club, season and competition
Club	Season	League			State League		Cup		Continental		Other		Total	
Club	Season	Division	Apps	Goals	Apps	Goals	Apps	Goals	Apps	Goals	Apps	Goals	Apps	Goals
Portuguesa	2018	Paulista A2	—		2	0	—		—		—		2	0
Jaguariúna	2018	Paulista 2ª Divisão	—		1	0	—		—		—		1	0
Lviv	2018–19	Ukrainian Premier League	12	0	—		1	0	—		—		13	0
Lviv	2019–20	Ukrainian Premier League	18	3	—		2	0	—		—		20	3
Lviv	2020–21	Ukrainian Premier League	0	0	—		0	0	—		—		0	0
Lviv	2021–22	Ukrainian Premier League	0	0	—		0	0	—		—		0	0
Lviv	2022–23	Ukrainian Premier League	0	0	—		0	0	—		—		0	0
Lviv	Total		30	3	—		3	0	—		—		33	3
Dinamo Tbilisi (loan)	2020	Erovnuli Liga	14	2	—		1	0	3	1	—		18	3
Bodø/Glimt (loan)	2021	Eliteserien	8	0	—		1	0	4	1	—		13	1
Sheriff Tiraspol (loan)	2021–22	Divizia Națională	10	3	—		3	2	0	0	—		13	5
Sheriff Tiraspol (loan)	2022–23	Divizia Națională	10	1	—		0	0	12	0	—		22	1
Sheriff Tiraspol (loan)	Total		20	4	—		3	2	12	0	—		35	6
Kyzylzhar	2023	Kazakhstan Premier League	8	4	—		1	0	0	0	—		9	4
Diósgyőri	2023–24	Nemzeti Bajnokság I	3	2	—		0	0	0	0	—		3	2
Career total			83	15	3	0	9	2	19	2	0	0	114	19

== Honours ==
Dinamo Tbilisi

- Erovnuli Liga: 2020

Bodø/Glimt

- Eliteserien: 2021

Sheriff Tiraspol

- Moldovan National Division: 2021–22
- Moldovan Cup: 2021–22
