= Fernando Costanza =

Brazilian footballer (born 1998)

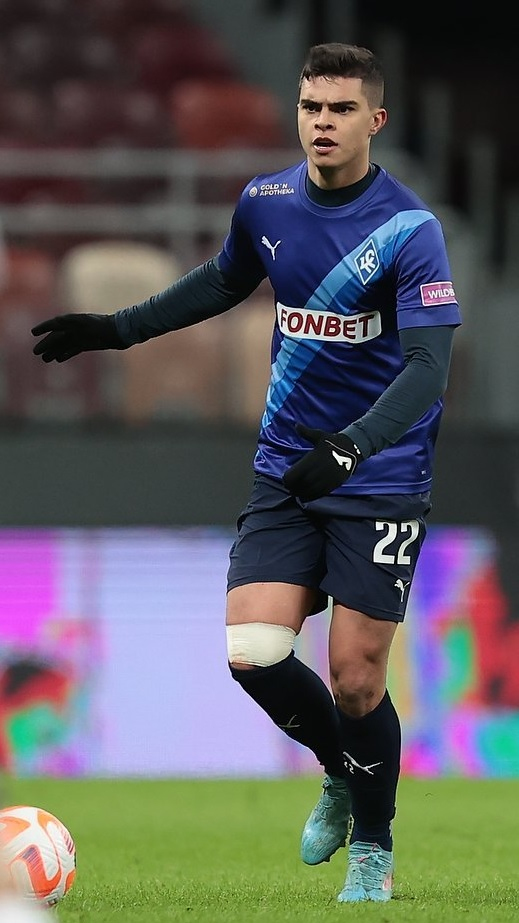
- Costanza with Krylia Sovetov in 2022

Personal information
- Full name: Fernando Peixoto Costanza
- Date of birth: 29 November 1998 (age 27)
- Place of birth: Rio de Janeiro, Brazil
- Height: 1.82 m (6 ft 0 in)
- Position: Defensive midfielder

Team information
- Current team: Krylia Sovetov
- Number: 22

Youth career
- 2008–2013: Fluminense
- 2014–2018: Botafogo

Senior career*
Years	Team	Apps	(Gls)
2018–2020	Botafogo	30	(0)
2018–2019	→ Lille II (loan)	10	(0)
2021–2022	Sheriff Tiraspol	28	(1)
2022–	Krylia Sovetov	108	(11)
- * Club domestic league appearances and goals as of 20 November 2026

Fernando Peixoto Costanza (born 29 November 1998) is an Italian-Brazilian footballer who plays as a defensive midfielder for Russian club Krylia Sovetov.

== Club career ==
Born in Rio de Janeiro, Costanza joined Botafogo's youth setup in 2014, from Fluminense. In December 2016, he signed a professional contract with the club.

On 28 August 2018, Costanza moved abroad and joined Lille OSC on a one-year loan deal. In the following March, after only appearing for their reserve team in the CFA, he was recalled.

Costanza made his first team – and Série A – debut on 5 May 2019, starting in a 1–0 home win against Fortaleza.

On 30 January 2022, Krylia Sovetov announced the signing of Fernando from Sheriff Tiraspol. On 12 December 2023, Krylia Sovetov and Costanza extended their contract to June 2028.

== Personal life ==
Costanza also holds the citizenship of Italy and was registered with the Russian Premier League as an Italian player.

== Career statistics ==
As of match played 20 November 2026

Appearances and goals by club, season and competition
Club	Season	League			Cup		Continental		Other		Total	
Club	Season	Division	Apps	Goals	Apps	Goals	Apps	Goals	Apps	Goals	Apps	Goals
Botafogo	2017	Série A	0	0	0	0	—		—		0	0
Botafogo	2019	Série A	22	0	0	0	2 (Note: Appearances in Copa Sudamericana)	0	—		24	0
Botafogo	2020	Série A	2	0	2	0	—		6 (Note: Appearances in Campeonato Carioca)	0	10	0
Botafogo	Total		24	0	2	0	2	0	6	0	34	0
Lille II (loan)	2018–19	CFA 2	10	0	—		—		—		10	0
Sheriff Tiraspol	2020–21	Divizia Națională	14	0	3	0	—		—		17	0
Sheriff Tiraspol	2021–22	Divizia Națională	14	1	1	0	9 (Note: Appearances in UEFA Champions League)	0	1 (Note: Appearance in Moldovan Super Cup)	0	25	1
Sheriff Tiraspol	Total		28	1	4	0	9	0	1	0	42	1
Krylia Sovetov Samara	2021–22	Russian Premier League	9	1	—		—		—		9	1
Krylia Sovetov Samara	2022–23	Russian Premier League	13	3	7	0	—		—		20	3
Krylia Sovetov Samara	2023–24	Russian Premier League	26	3	4	0	—		—		30	3
Krylia Sovetov Samara	2024–25	Russian Premier League	21	1	3	1	—		—		24	2
Krylia Sovetov Samara	2025–26	Russian Premier League	25	3	6	0	—		—		31	3
Krylia Sovetov Samara	2026–27	Russian Premier League	14	0	3	0	—		—		17	0
Krylia Sovetov Samara	Total		108	11	23	1	—		—		131	12
Career total			170	12	29	1	11	0	7	0	217	13

== Honours ==
Sheriff Tiraspol

- Moldovan Liga: 2020–21, 2021–22
- Moldovan Cup: 2021–22
