= Gustavo Dulanto =

Peruvian footballer (born 1995)

Personal information
- Full name: Gustavo Alfonso Dulanto Sanguinetti
- Date of birth: 5 September 1995 (age 31)
- Place of birth: Lima, Peru
- Height: 1.96 m (6 ft 5 in)
- Position: Centre-back

Team information
- Current team: Sport Boys

Youth career
- 2000–2006: Sporting Cristal
- 2006–2007: Universidad San Martín
- 2007–2009: AF Frama
- 2009–2011: Universidad San Martín
- 2011–2014: Rosario Central

Senior career*
Years	Team	Apps	(Gls)
2014–2016	Universitario de Deportes	17	(1)
2017	UTC	41	(7)
2018–2019	Real Garcilaso	38	(3)
2019–2020	Boavista	11	(2)
2021–2022	Sheriff Tiraspol	33	(3)
2022–2023	Riga	4	(0)
2024–	Universitario de Deportes	10	(0)
2025	→ ADT (loan)	14	(1)
2026-	→ Sport Boys (loan)	0	(0)
- * Club domestic league appearances and goals as of 28 January 2023

Gustavo Alfonso Dulanto Sanguinetti (born 5 September 1995) is a Peruvian professional footballer who plays as a centre-back for Peruvian Liga 1 club Sport Boys on loan from Universitario de Deportes.

== Club career ==
=== Universitario ===
Dulanto was born in Lima, and finished his formation with Rosario Central. On 3 September 2014 he returned to his home country, after agreeing to a contract with Universitario. Dulanto made his senior debut on 1 May 2015, starting and being sent off in a 1–0 away loss against Unión Comercio. He scored his first goal for the club on 2 August, netting the first in a 1–1 home draw against Real Garcilaso. On 20 August, Dulanto scored in a 1–3 away victory against Deportivo Anzoátegui in the 2015 Copa Sudamericana elimination stages. In 2016, he rarely featured during the campaign, playing only 3 matches.

=== UTC ===
On 22 December 2016, Dulanto moved to fellow league team UTC Cajamarca. In his only season at the club, he scored seven goals in 41 appearances as the club reached the Finals of the Torneo de Verano.

=== Real Garcilaso ===
On 16 December 2017, Dulanto joined Real Garcilaso. He was also a regular starter at his new side, also appearing in the 2018 Copa Libertadores.

=== Boavista ===
On 7 July 2019, Dulanto moved abroad and joined Portuguese Primeira Liga side Boavista on a two-year contract. He made his debut abroad on 31 October, replacing Gustavo Sauer in a 2–0 home win over S.C. Braga.

Dulanto scored his first goal for Boavista on 7 March 2020, netting the equalizer in a 1–1 draw at C.D. Tondela. Ahead of the 2020–21 season, he was deemed surplus to requirements, and terminated his contract on 1 December.

=== Sheriff Tiraspol ===
On 6 February 2021, Dulanto signed for Moldavian club Sheriff Tiraspol. In the 2021–22 UEFA Champions League, he was an undisputed first-choice as Sheriff became the first Moldovan team to qualify for the group stages of the competition after a 3–0 aggregate win over Dinamo Zagreb. They were drawn into Group D to face Inter Milan, Real Madrid and Shakhtar Donetsk, with Sheriff winning their opening group game, 2–0 against Shakhtar Donetsk, before following it up with a 2–1 away victory over Real Madrid at the Santiago Bernabéu on 28 September 2021, with Sébastien Thill scoring the winning goal in the 89th minute; Dulanto played the full 90 minutes on both matches.

== Personal life ==
Dulanto's father, Alfonso, was also a footballer.

== Career statistics ==
As of match played 21 May 2022.

Club	Season	League			Cup		Continental		Other		Total	
Club	Season	Division	Apps	Goals	Apps	Goals	Apps	Goals	Apps	Goals	Apps	Goals
Universitario	2015	Torneo Descentralizado	14	1	—		3 (Note: Appearances in the Copa Sudamericana)	1	—		17	2
Universitario	2016	Torneo Descentralizado	3	0	—		0	0	—		3	0
Universitario	Total		17	1	—		3	1	—		20	2
UTC	2017	Torneo Descentralizado	41	7	—		—		—		41	7
Real Garcilaso	2018	Torneo Descentralizado	34	3	—		5 (Note: Appearances in the Copa Libertadores)	0	—		39	3
Real Garcilaso	2019	Torneo Descentralizado	4	0	—		1	0	—		5	0
Real Garcilaso	Total		38	3	—		6	0	—		44	3
Boavista	2019–20	Primeira Liga	10	2	0	0	—		1 (Note: Appearances in the Taça da Liga)	0	11	2
Boavista	2020–21	Primeira Liga	0	0	0	0	—		0	0	0	0
Boavista	Total		10	2	0	0	—		1	0	11	2
Sheriff Tiraspol	2020–21	Divizia Națională	11	2	3	0	—		—		15	2
Sheriff Tiraspol	2021–22	Divizia Națională	22	0	3	0	15 (Note: 14 appearances and on goal in the UEFA Champions League, 1 appearances and zero goals in the UEFA Europa League)	1	1 (Note: Appearances in the Moldovan Super Cup)	0	40	1
Sheriff Tiraspol	Total		33	2	6	0	14	1	1	0	54	3
Career total			139	15	6	0	23	2	2	0	170	17

== Honours ==
Sheriff Tiraspol

- 2020–21 Moldovan National Division
- 2021–22 Moldovan National Division
- 2021–22 Moldovan Cup

Universitario de Deportes

- Peruvian Primera División: 2024
- Torneo Apertura: 2025
- Torneo Clausura: 2024
- Peruvian Primera División: Apertura 2016
