= Serghei Cebotari =

Moldovan footballer and coach (born 1981)

Personal information
- Date of birth: 21 February 1981 (age 45)
- Place of birth: Chișinău, Moldavian SSR, Soviet Union

Team information
- Current team: Moldova U21 (head coach)

Managerial career
- Years: Team
- 2018–2021: Sfîntul Gheorghe
- 2022–2023: Bălți
- 2023–2025: Moldova U19
- 2025–: Moldova U21

Serghei Cebotari (born 21 February 1981) is a Moldovan football manager and former player who is currently the head coach of the Moldova national under-21 team.

== Playing career ==
During his playing career, Cebotari played in Moldova and Sweden.

== Managerial career ==
Cebotari worked as a coach at CSCT Buiucani, Academia Chișinău and Zaria Bălți, before being appointed head coach of Sfîntul Gheorghe in April 2018. During his three and a half years at the club, Sfîntul Gheorghe reached the Moldovan Cup final three times, winning it once. The club also became runners-up of the Moldovan National Division once, and winners of the Moldovan Super Cup once. He left the club in September 2021. In January 2022, he was appointed head coach of Bălți.

== Honours ==
Sfîntul Gheorghe

- Moldovan Cup: 2020–21
- Moldovan Super Cup: 2021
