= Cris Silva =

Brazilian footballer (born 1993)

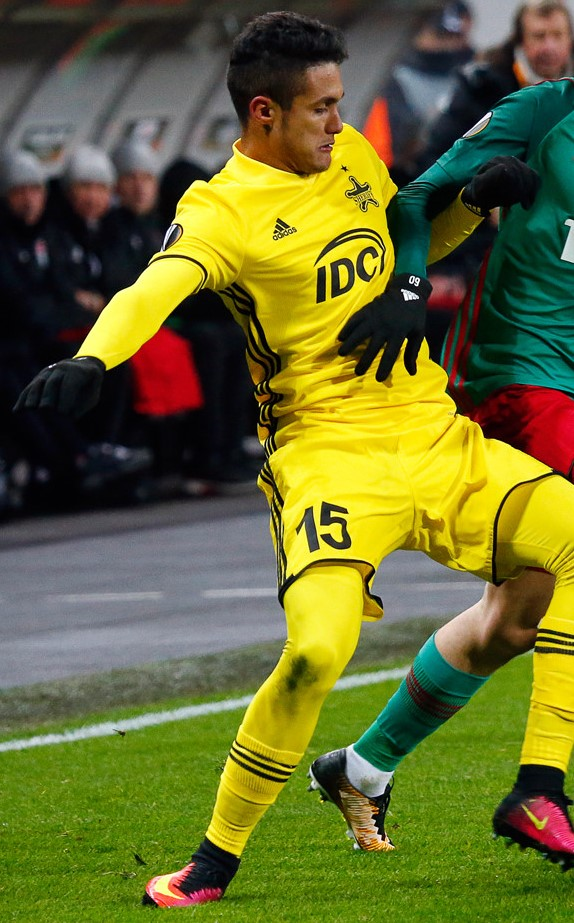

Personal information
- Full name: Cristiano da Silva Leite
- Date of birth: 29 August 1993 (age 33)
- Place of birth: Niterói, Brazil
- Height: 1.78 m (5 ft 10 in)
- Position: Left back

Team information
- Current team: Sporting Cristal
- Number: 90

Senior career*
Years	Team	Apps	(Gls)
2014–2016	Vitória das Tabocas	23	(1)
2014	→ Murici (loan)	7	(0)
2014	→ CRB (loan)	11	(0)
2015	→ Bonsucesso (loan)	13	(0)
2015	→ Criciúma (loan)	13	(0)
2016	→ Volta Redonda (loan)	13	(0)
2017–2018	Volta Redonda	31	(1)
2017	→ Sheriff Tiraspol (loan)	17	(1)
2018–2022	Sheriff Tiraspol	82	(2)
2022–2024	Fluminense	27	(0)
2023	→ Chapecoense (loan)	27	(1)
2024	Goiás	13	(0)
2025	Operário Ferroviário	28	(0)
2026–	Sporting Cristal	3	(0)
- * Club domestic league appearances and goals as of 8 February 2026

Cristiano da Silva Leite (born 29 August 1993), commonly known as Cris Silva or simply Cristiano, is a Brazilian footballer, who plays for Sporting Cristal.

== Career ==
On 22 June 2017, Cris Silva signed for FC Sheriff Tiraspol. On 14 November 2019, Cristiano extended his contract with Sheriff Tiraspol, which was due to end at the end of the 2020 season.

== Career statistics ==
=== Club ===
As of match played 19 October 2021

Appearances and goals by club, season and competition
Club	Season	League			National Cup		Continental		Other		Total	
Club	Season	Division	Apps	Goals	Apps	Goals	Apps	Goals	Apps	Goals	Apps	Goals
Sheriff Tiraspol (loan)	2017	Moldovan National Division	17	1	0	0	12 (Note: Four appearances in the UEFA Champions League, eight appearances in the UEFA Europa League)	0	0 (Note: Appearances in the Moldovan Super Cup)	0	29	1
Sheriff Tiraspol	2018	Moldovan National Division	23	1	3	0	8 (Note: Four appearances in the UEFA Champions League, four appearances in the UEFA Europa League)	0	-		35	1
Sheriff Tiraspol	2019	Moldovan National Division	24	0	5	0	6 (Note: Two appearances in the UEFA Champions League, four appearances in the UEFA Europa League)	0	1	0	36	0
Sheriff Tiraspol	2020–21	Moldovan National Division	28	1	5	0	3 (Note: Two appearances in the UEFA Champions League, one appearance in the UEFA Europa League)	0	-		36	1
Sheriff Tiraspol	2021–22	Moldovan National Division	7	1	0	0	11 (Note: Appearances in the UEFA Champions League)	0	1	0	19	0
Sheriff Tiraspol	Total		82	3	13	0	28	0	2	0	125	3
Career total			99	4	13	0	40	0	2	0	154	4

== Honours ==
Sheriff Tiraspol

- Moldovan National Division: 2017, 2018, 2019
- Moldovan Cup: 2018–19

Fluminense

- Taça Guanabara: 2022
- Campeonato Carioca: 2022

Operário Ferroviário

- Campeonato Paranaense: 2025
