= Yuriy Vernydub =

Ukrainian association football manager (born 1966)

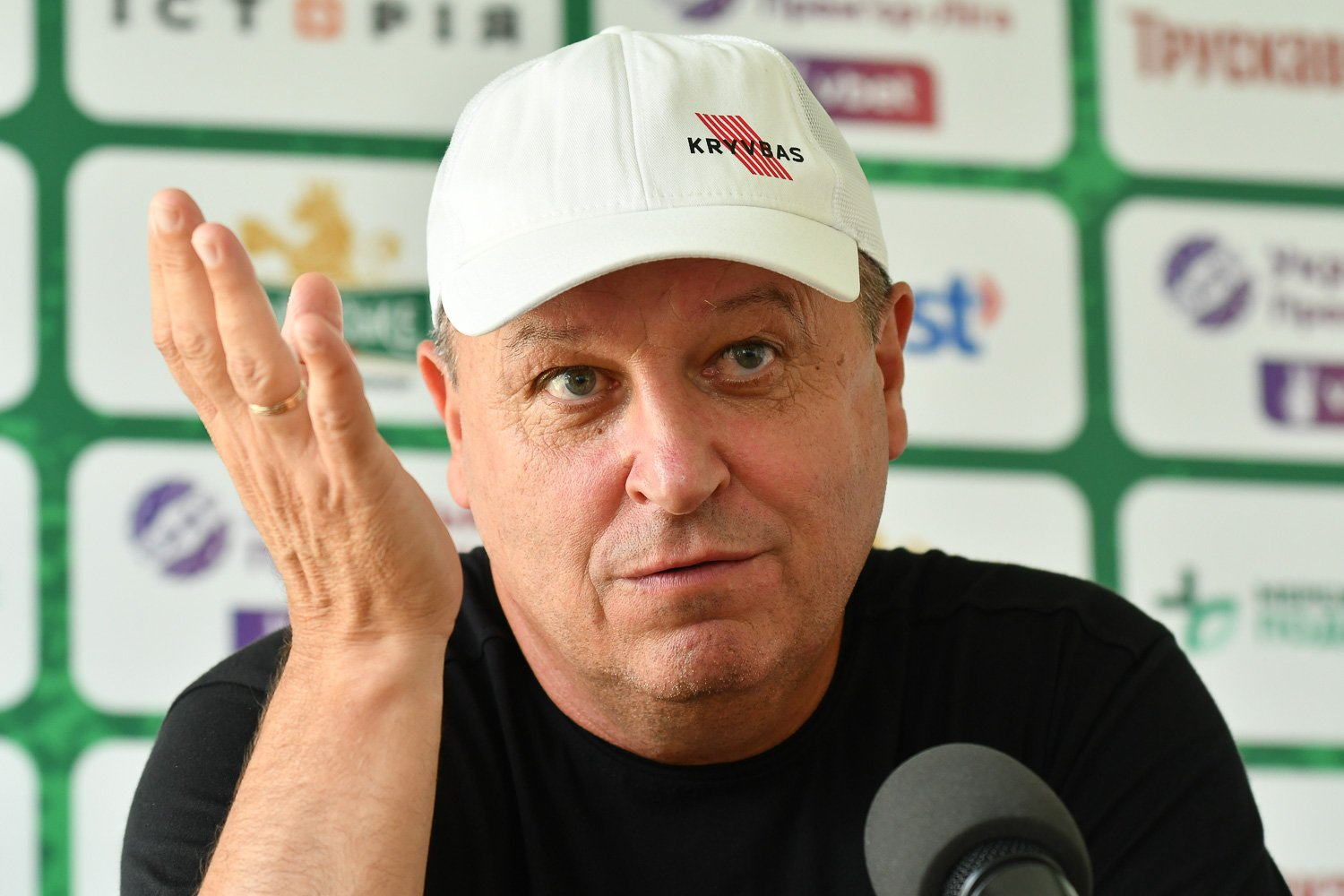
- Vernydub in 2024

Personal information
- Full name: Yuriy Mykolayovych Vernydub
- Date of birth: 22 January 1966 (age 60)
- Place of birth: Zhytomyr, Ukrainian SSR
- Height: 1.80 m (5 ft 11 in)
- Positions: Defender; midfielder

Team information
- Current team: Neftçi (manager)

Senior career*
Years	Team	Apps	(Gls)
1983–1984	Spartak Zhytomyr	68	(5)
1985–1986	LVVPU Lviv		
1987	Kolos Nikopol	33	(4)
1988	Dnipro Dnipropetrovsk	0	(0)
1988–1989	Prykarpattya Ivano-Frankivsk	71	(4)
1989–1993	Metalurh Zaporizhzhia	112	(5)
1993–1994	Chemnitzer FC	7	(0)
1994–1997	Torpedo Zaporizhia	76	(11)
1997–2000	Zenit Saint Petersburg	83	(2)
1998–2000	→ Zenit-2 Saint Petersburg	12	(0)
Total		462	(31)

Managerial career
- 2001–2002: Metalurh Zaporizhzhia (assistant)
- 2007–2009: Metalurh Zaporizhzhia (assistant)
- 2007: Metalurh Zaporizhzhia (caretaker)
- 2009–2011: Zorya Luhansk (assistant)
- 2011–2019: Zorya Luhansk
- 2019–2020: Shakhtyor Soligorsk
- 2020–2022: Sheriff Tiraspol
- 2022–2025: Kryvbas Kryvyi Rih
- 2025–: Neftçi
- * Club domestic league appearances and goals

Yuriy Mykolayovych Vernydub (Ukrainian: Юрій Миколайович Вернидуб; born 22 January 1966) is a Ukrainian professional football coach and former player who is the manager of Azerbaijan Premier League club Neftçi.

== Career ==
Vernydub made his professional debut in the Soviet Second League in 1983 for FC Spartak Zhytomyr.

From June 2009, he was an assistant coach with FC Metalurh Zaporizhzhia. After a spell as an assistant coach with FC Zorya Luhansk he was made interim head coach in November 2011 after Zorya's management dismissed head coach Anatoly Chantsev. He stayed at Zorya until 31 May 2019. After leaving Zorya, he coached Belarusian club Shakhtyor Soligorsk. He was appointed manager of Moldovan National Division club Sheriff Tiraspol on 18 December 2020. He won the 2020–21 Moldovan National Division in his first season at the club. In 2021, he led the team to the 2021–22 UEFA Champions League group stage — the first time a Moldovan club accomplished such a feat.

On 8 June 2022, Sheriff Tiraspol and Vernydub agreed to the mutual termination of his contract as Head Coach of the club.

On 21 June 2022, he become the manager of Kryvbas Kryvyi Rih. After the 2024–25 season he left the team.

On 9 December 2025, Vernydub joined Azerbaijan Premier League side Neftçi, signing a one-and-a-half-year contract.

== Personal life ==
In February 2022, Vernydub left his position of Head Coach of Sheriff Tiraspol to join the Armed Forces of Ukraine in response to Russia's invasion of Ukraine that began on 24 February 2022.

== Honours ==
=== Player ===
Zenit Saint Petersburg

- Russian Cup: 1998–99

=== Manager ===
Shakhtyor Soligorsk

- Belarusian Premier League: 2020

Sheriff Tiraspol

- Moldovan National Division: 2020–21, 2021–22
- Moldovan Cup: 2020–21
- Moldovan Super Cup: Runner-Up 2021

Individual

- Ukrainian Premier League Manager of the Month: 2022-23(November–December), 2023-24(September),
