= Georgios Athanasiadis (footballer, born 1993) =

Greek footballer

Giorgos Athanasiadis
Personal information
- Full name: Georgios Athanasiadis
- Date of birth: 7 April 1993 (age 33)
- Place of birth: Melanthio, Kilkis, Greece
- Height: 1.91 m (6 ft 3 in)
- Position: Goalkeeper

Team information
- Current team: Iraklis
- Number: 33

Youth career
- Iraklis
- Ethnikos Sochou

Senior career*
Years	Team	Apps	(Gls)
2012–2016	Panthrakikos	59	(0)
2016–2019	Asteras Tripolis	41	(0)
2019–2024	AEK Athens	62	(0)
2021–2022	→ Sheriff Tiraspol (loan)	17	(0)
2024–2025	AEK Larnaca	32	(0)
2025–2026	Aris	19	(0)
2026–	Iraklis	5	(0)

International career^{‡}
2024	Greece	1	(0)
- * Club domestic league appearances and goals as of 19 September 2026 ‡ National team caps and goals as of 7 June 2024

Georgios Athanasiadis (Greek: Γεώργιος Αθανασιάδης; born 7 April 1993) is a Greek professional footballer who plays as a goalkeeper for Super League club Iraklis. He has also played for the Greece national team.

== Club career ==
=== Asteras Tripolis ===
On 29 June 2016, Asteras Tripolis officially announced the signing of Athanasiadis on a three-year deal.

=== AEK Athens ===
On 13 June 2019, AEK Athens confirmed the signing of the Greek goalkeeper, with his contract running until the summer of 2023. Athanasiadis made his debut vs Zorya Lugansk on 26/11/2020, where AEK lost 0–3 after staying with 10 men. During the 2020–21 season he shared the goalkeeper position with Tsintotas and AEK managed to clinch a spot in the Conference league Qualifiers, by clinching 4th place 3 match days before the end of the season. Athanasiadis won the Super League on 14/5/2023 when he started and kept a clean in AEK Athens' 4–0 victory over Volos. Athanasiadis was subbed in the game vs Marseille in Velodrome after starting goalkeeper Cican Stankovic received a red card and caused a penalty in the second half. The score at the time was 1-1 but AEK went on to lose 3–1. He also played another two Europa League games vs Marseille and Ajax, but AEK finished 4th in the group stage. Athanasiadis kept a clean sheet vs Aris on 4/12/2023, helping AEK clinch a tight 1–0 victory. However, in the summer transfer window of 2024–25 season, with the arrival of Alberto Brignoli and Thomas Strakosha, him along with his fellow goalkeeper, Cican Stankovic were sidelined and were asked to find another team for them to play for.

==== Loan to Sheriff Tiraspol ====
On 18 June 2021, he was loaned to Sheriff Tiraspol until the summer of 2022. The Greek keeper had a vital contribution in the qualifying phase and play-off round, keeping six clean sheets in eight matches. In the qualifying phase, Athanasiadis made 21 saves and produced another man-of-the-match performance on 21 August against Dinamo Zagreb, keeping a clean sheet & making six crucial saves.

On 28 September 2021, in the second UEFA Champions League group stage match he performed impressively against Real Madrid, making 10 saves, producing one of the great Champions League shocks as the competition's least experienced club defeated the 13-time European champions at the Santiago Bernabéu Stadium. He was voted Man of the Match for his performance.

On 24 December 2021, Athanasiadis was named the best goalkeeper of the year in Moldova for his excellent performances with his club. In the league, he participated in 11 matches for Sheriff, recording an impressive nine clean sheets, while he played in 13 matches in the UEFA Champions League including the qualifying rounds. He was the goalkeeper with the most saves in the 2021–22 UEFA Champions League group stage with 29 saves.

== International career ==
Athanasiadis was called up by the senior Greece side for the 2022–23 UEFA Nations League matches against Northern Ireland, Kosovo and Cyprus in June 2022.

He made his debut on 7 June 2024 in a friendly against Germany at Borussia-Park. He substituted Odysseas Vlachodimos in the 78th minute, as Germany scored the last-minute goal to finish their comeback in a 2–1 victory.

== Career statistics ==
As of match played 5 July 2026

Appearances and goals by club, season and competition
Club	Season	League			National cup (Note: Includes Greek Cup, Moldovan Cup)		Europe		Other		Total	
Club	Season	Division	Apps	Goals	Apps	Goals	Apps	Goals	Apps	Goals	Apps	Goals
Panthrakikos	2012–13	Superleague Greece	2	0	0	0	—		—		2	0
Panthrakikos	2013–14	Superleague Greece	8	0	0	0	—		—		8	0
Panthrakikos	2014–15	Superleague Greece	25	0	2	0	—		—		27	0
Panthrakikos	2015–16	Superleague Greece	24	0	1	0	—		—		25	0
Panthrakikos	Total		59	0	3	0	—		—		62	0
Asteras Tripolis	2016–17	Superleague Greece	3	0	4	0	—		—		7	0
Asteras Tripolis	2017–18	Superleague Greece	30	0	4	0	—		—		34	0
Asteras Tripolis	2018–19	Superleague Greece	8	0	7	0	2 (Note: Appearances in UEFA Europa League)	0	—		17	0
Asteras Tripolis	Total		41	0	15	0	2	0	—		58	0
AEK Athens	2019–20	Superleague Greece	0	0	0	0	0	0	—		0	0
AEK Athens	2020–21	Superleague Greece	19	0	1	0	1	0	—		21	0
AEK Athens	2022–23	Superleague Greece	30	0	0	0	—		—		30	0
AEK Athens	2023–24	Superleague Greece	13	0	2	0	4	0	—		30	0
AEK Athens	Total		62	0	3	0	5	0	—		70	0
Sheriff Tiraspol (loan)	2021–22	Moldovan National Division	17	0	2	0	15 (Note: Thirteen appearances in UEFA Champions League, two appearances in UEFA Europa League)	0	1 (Note: Appearance in Moldovan Super Cup)	0	35	0
AEK Larnaca	2024–25	Cypriot First Division	32	0	3	0	0	0	—		35	0
Aris	2025–26	Superleague Greece	19	0	6	0	1	0	—		26	0
Career total			230	0	32	0	23	0	1	0	286	0

== Honours ==
Sheriff Tiraspol

- Moldovan National Division: 2021–22
- Moldovan Cup: 2021–22

AEK Athens

- Super League Greece: 2022–23
- Greek Cup: 2022–23

AEK Larnaca

- Cypriot Cup: 2024–25

Individual

- Moldovan National Division Best Goalkepper: 2021
