= Michele Bon =

Italian association football coach

Personal information
- Full name: Michele Bon
- Date of birth: 22 November 1972 (age 53)
- Place of birth: Palmanova, Italy

Team information
- Current team: Al-Ittihad (assistant)

Managerial career
- Years: Team
- 2003–2004: Udinese Youth (assistant)
- 2004–2005: Sportul Studențesc (athletic coach)
- 2006: Wisła Kraków (athletic coach)
- 2007–2009: Unirea Urziceni (athletic coach)
- 2009–2010: FC Timișoara (assistant)
- 2011–2012: FCSB (assistant)
- 2011–2012: FCM Târgu Mureș (assistant)
- 2013: Al-Nasr U23
- 2014: Al-Muharraq
- 2016: Petrolul Ploiesti (assistant)
- 2016: CSM Sighet
- 2016–2017: South China (technical director)
- 2018: Balmazújváros (assistant)
- 2019: FC Voluntari (assistant)
- 2020–2021: Csíkszereda Miercurea Ciuc (assistant)
- 2021–2022: Zimbru Chișinău
- 2023: Emirates Club (assistant)
- 2024–: Al-Ittihad (assistant)

Michele Bon (born 22 November 1972) is an Italian football manager who is currently the assistant manager of Libyan club Al-Ittihad.

In late November 2021, Bon was appointed as manager of Moldovan club FC Zimbru Chișinău, replacing Vlad Goian. Prior to this, Bon has worked as manager and assistant manager to a number of clubs from Romania and Hungary.

In June 2022 he was fired from Zimbru after 13 matches.

Bon speaks fluently a number of languages, including native Italian, English, Spanish, and Romanian.

Bon has UEFA PRO manager license and is alumni of Coverciano football school. A long time in his career, Bon has worked in Romania, or with Romanian managers in team.
