= Danilo Arboleda =

Colombian footballer (born 1995)

Personal information
- Full name: Danilo Arboleda Hurtado
- Date of birth: 16 May 1995 (age 31)
- Place of birth: Florida, Colombia
- Height: 1.91 m (6 ft 3 in)
- Position: Centre-back

Team information
- Current team: San Lorenzo
- Number: 2

Senior career*
Years	Team	Apps	(Gls)
2015–2017	Deportivo Cali	4	(0)
2017	Patriotas Boyacá	35	(2)
2018–2019	América de Cali	31	(3)
2019–2020	La Equidad	26	(0)
2020	Deportivo Pasto	19	(1)
2021	Sheriff Tiraspol	29	(3)
2022–2023	Al Ain	21	(2)
2023	Al Ahli	12	(0)
2024	Wuhan Three Towns	4	(0)
2024–2025	Kazma		
2025–2026	Banfield	20	(0)
2026–	San Lorenzo	13	(0)
- * Club domestic league appearances and goals as of 01:32, 7 November 2026 (UTC)

Danilo Arboleda Hurtado (born 16 May 1995) is a Colombian footballer who plays as a defender for Argentine Primera División club San Lorenzo.

== Career ==
Arboleda made his debut for Deportivo Cali in the Categoría Primera A on 12 February 2015. He has later played for four other clubs in the Colombian top division, namely Patriotas Boyacá, América de Cali, La Equidad and Deportivo Pasto.

On 1 February 2021, Arboleda signed for Moldovan National Division club Sheriff Tiraspol.

On 24 February 2024, Arboleda signed with Chinese Super League club Wuhan Three Towns.

== Career statistics ==
=== Club ===
As of 25 July 2024

Club	Season	League			National Cup		Continental		Other		Total	
Club	Season	Division	Apps	Goals	Apps	Goals	Apps	Goals	Apps	Goals	Apps	Goals
Deportivo Cali	2015	Categoría Primera A	4	0	4	1	—		—		8	1
Patriotas Boyacá	2017	Categoría Primera A	35	2	8	0	4 (Note: Appearance(s) in Copa Sudamericana)	0	—		47	2
América de Cali	2018	Categoría Primera A	31	3	2	0	1	0	—		34	3
La Equidad	2019	Categoría Primera A	26	0	1	0	8	0	—		35	0
Deportivo Pasto	2020	Categoría Primera A	19	1	—		2	0	—		21	1
Sheriff Tiraspol	2020-21	Moldovan Super Liga	12	0	2	0	—		—		14	0
Sheriff Tiraspol	2021-22	Moldovan Super Liga	17	3	—		14 (Note: Appearance(s) in UEFA Champions League)	1	1 (Note: Appearance(s) in Supercupa Moldovei)	0	32	4
Sheriff Tiraspol	Total		29	3	2	0	14	1	1	0	46	4
Al Ain	2021-22	UAE Pro League	14	1	—		—		3 (Note: Appearance(s) in UAE League Cup)	0	17	1
Al Ain	2022-23	UAE Pro League	7	1	—		—		0	0	7	1
Al Ain	Total		21	2	—		—		3	0	24	2
Al Ahli	2023-24	Qatar Stars League	12	0	—		—		2 (Note: Appearance(s) in Qatari Stars Cup)	1	14	1
Wuhan Three Towns	2024	Chinese Super League	4	0	0	0	—		—		4	0
Career Total			181	11	17	1	29	1	6	1	133	14

== Honours ==
Al Ain

- UAE Pro League: 2021–22
- UAE League Cup: 2021–22
