= Razak Abalora =

Ghanaian footballer (born 1996)

Personal information
- Full name: Razak Abalora
- Date of birth: 4 September 1996 (age 30)
- Place of birth: Accra, Ghana
- Height: 1.94 m (6 ft 4 in)
- Position: Goalkeeper

Team information
- Current team: Zenis
- Number: 40

Youth career
- 2010–2013: West African Football Academy

Senior career*
Years	Team	Apps	(Gls)
2013–2017	WAFA	24	(0)
2017–2020	Azam	100	(0)
2020–2022	Asante Kotoko	33	(0)
2022–2024	Sheriff Tiraspol	15	(0)
2024	Petrocub Hîncești	10	(0)
2024–2025	AF Elbasani	27	(0)
2025–	Zenis	0	(0)

International career^{‡}
2019–	Ghana	4	(0)
- * Club domestic league appearances and goals as of 2 November 2025 ‡ National team caps and goals as of 23 December 2019

Razak Abalora (born 4 September 1996) is a Ghanaian professional footballer who plays for Kazakhstan Premier League club Zenis as a goalkeeper.

== Club career ==
Abalora joined the Feyenoord Academy and went on to spend three years before joining the senior team now called West African Football Academy (WAFA). Abalora spent the next five years at the Ghanaian Premier League team before he moved to Azam. He joined Azam on a three-year deal in July 2017.

In October 2020, he joined Asante Kotoko on as a free agent on 3-year contract. He made his debut on 20 December 2020, in a 1–0 victory over Dreams. He was appointed the deputy captain of the club to Ismail Abdul-Ganiyu. He left the club in 2022 and joined Sheriff Tiraspol. He played 33 league matches and kept 17 clean sheets.

In January 2022, Abalora joined Moldovan football club Sheriff Tiraspol on a three-year contract. This made him the fourth Ghanaian player to join the club in the space of two years.

In August 2024, Abalora joined Albanian football club AF Elbasani on a three-year contract. He replaced the existing goalkeeper Klevi Totoshi, after bad performances by this goalkeeper.

== International career ==
Razak earned his first cap for Ghana on 19 October 2019. The call up was for the 2021 African Cup of Nations qualifying matches against South Africa, São Tomé and Príncipe.

== Honours ==
Azam

- Tanzania FA Cup: 2018–19
- Kagame Interclub Cup: 2018
- Mapinduzi Cup: 2018, 2019

Asante Kotoko

- Ghana Premier League: 2021–22

Sheriff Tiraspol

- Moldovan Super Liga: 2021–22, 2022–23
- Moldovan Cup: 2021–22

Petrocub Hîncești

- Moldovan Super Liga: 2023–24
- Moldovan Cup 2023–24

Individual

- Azam Best Player Award: 2017–18, 2018–19, 2019–20
