= Hansel Zapata =

Colombian footballer (born 1995)

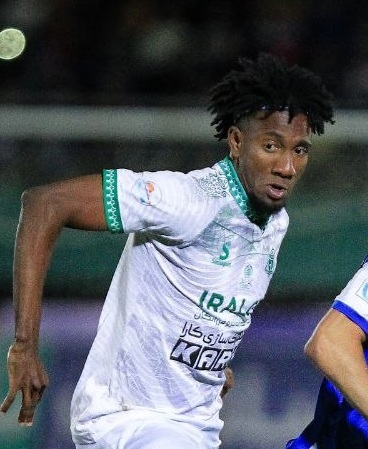

Personal information
- Full name: Hansel Orlando Zapata Zape
- Date of birth: 11 February 1995 (age 31)
- Place of birth: Puerto Tejada, Colombia
- Height: 1.82 m (6 ft 0 in)
- Position: Attacking midfielder

Senior career*
Years	Team	Apps	(Gls)
2015–2016	Unión Magdalena	46	(5)
2017	Once Caldas	16	(0)
2018–2021	La Equidad	80	(10)
2019–2020	→ Millonarios (loan)	26	(2)
2021–2022	Sheriff Tiraspol	3	(0)
2021–2022	→ Slaven Belupo (loan)	28	(2)
2022–2023	Aluminium Arak	29	(3)
2023–2024	Al-Nasr	9	(8)
- * Club domestic league appearances and goals as of 8:47, 18 January 2025 (UTC)

Hansel Orlando Zapata Zape (born 11 February 1995) is a Colombian professional footballer who plays as an attacking midfielder.

== Career ==
Zapata started his career with Unión Magdalena. He made his debut in the Categoría Primera B on 15 February 2015. He then transferred to Categoría Primera A club Once Caldas ahead of the 2017 season. He has later played for two other clubs in the Colombian top division, namely Millonarios and La Equidad.

On 29 June 2021, Zapata signed for Moldovan National Division club FC Sheriff Tiraspol.
