= Dušan Marković (footballer, born 1998) =

Serbian football player

Personal information
- Date of birth: 3 April 1998 (age 28)
- Place of birth: Smederevska Palanka, FR Yugoslavia
- Height: 1.95 m (6 ft 5 in)
- Position: Goalkeeper

Team information
- Current team: Radnik Bijeljina
- Number: 1

Youth career
- –2017: Rad

Senior career*
Years	Team	Apps	(Gls)
2017–2020	Rad	79	(0)
2021	Sheriff Tiraspol	14	(0)
2022	Metalac Gornji Milanovac	15	(0)
2022–2023	Dečić	35	(0)
2023–2024	Ethnikos Achna	6	(0)
2024	Žalgiris	2	(0)
2025	IMT	0	(0)
2026–	Radnik Bijeljina	22	(0)

International career
2018	Serbia U21	1	(0)
- * Club domestic league appearances and goals as of 31 October 2026

Dušan Marković (Serbian Cyrillic: Душан Марковић; born 3 April 1998) is a Serbian professional footballer who plays as a goalkeeper for Bosnian Premier League club Radnik Bijeljina.

== Career ==
=== Club ===
On 4 February 2021, Sheriff Tiraspol announced the signing of Marković.

On December 12th 2024, Dusan Markovic and FK Zalgiris’ board have both agreed to part ways.

== Career statistics ==
=== Club ===
As of match played 31 October 2026

Appearances and goals by club, season and competition
Club	Season	League			National cup (Note: Includes Serbian Cup, Moldovan Cup, Montenegrin Cup, Cypriot Cup, Bosnian Cup)		Continental		Total	
Club	Season	Division	Apps	Goals	Apps	Goals	Apps	Goals	Apps	Goals
Rad	2017–18	Serbian SuperLiga	4	0	–		–		4	0
Rad	2018–19	Serbian SuperLiga	36	0	1	0	–		37	0
Rad	2019–20	Serbian SuperLiga	30	0	–		–		30	0
Rad	2020–21	Serbian SuperLiga	9	0	1	0	–		10	0
Rad	Total		79	0	2	0	–		81	0
Sheriff Tiraspol	2020–21	Moldovan National Division	11	0	2	0	–		13	0
Sheriff Tiraspol	2021–22	Moldovan National Division	3	0	1	0	–		4	0
Sheriff Tiraspol	Total		14	0	3	0	–		17	0
Metalac Gornji Milanovac	2021–22	Serbian SuperLiga	15	0	1	0	–		16	0
Dečić	2022–23	Montenegrin First League	35	0	4	0	2 (Note: Appearances in the UEFA Europa Conference League)	0	41	0
Ethnikos Achna	2023–24	Cypriot First Division	6	0	1	0	–		7	0
Žalgiris	2024	A Lyga	2	0	–		–		2	0
IMT	2024–25	Serbian SuperLiga	0	0	1	0	–		1	0
Radnik Bijeljina	2025–26	Bosnian Premier League	13	0	2	0	–		15	0
Radnik Bijeljina	2026–27	Bosnian Premier League	9	0	0	0	–		9	0
Radnik Bijeljina	Total		22	0	2	0	–		24	0
Career total			173	0	14	0	2	0	189	0
