= Keston Julien =

Trinidad and Tobago footballer (born 1998)

Personal information
- Full name: Keston Anthony Julien
- Date of birth: 26 October 1998 (age 28)
- Place of birth: Port of Spain, Trinidad and Tobago
- Height: 1.78 m (5 ft 10 in)
- Position: Left back

Senior career*
Years	Team	Apps	(Gls)
2016	W Connection	0	(0)
2016	San Juan Jabloteh	0	(0)
2017–2020	AS Trenčín	37	(3)
2020–2023	Sheriff Tiraspol	44	(2)

International career^{‡}
2018–	Trinidad and Tobago	12	(0)
- * Club domestic league appearances and goals as of 11:08, 1 June 2021 (UTC) ‡ National team caps and goals as of 15 October 2023

Keston Julien (born 26 October 1998) is a Trinidadian footballer who plays as a left-back.

== Career ==
=== AS Trenčín ===
Julien made his Fortuna Liga debut for AS Trenčín against Slovan Bratislava on 25 February 2017.

=== Sheriff Tiraspol ===
On 17 August 2020, Julien signed for the Divizia Națională club Sheriff Tiraspol.

On 2 May 2023, Julien has announced his departure from the club at the end of the season by mutual consent.

== Career statistics ==
=== International ===
As of match played 14 October 2019

Appearances and goals by national team and year
National team	Year	Apps	Goals
Trinidad and Tobago	2018	2	0
Trinidad and Tobago	2019	1	0
Total		3	0
