= Sergiu Istrati =

Moldovan footballer

Personal information
- Date of birth: 7 August 1988 (age 38)
- Place of birth: Chișinău, Moldova
- Height: 1.74 m (5 ft 9 in)
- Position: Forward

Senior career*
Years	Team	Apps	(Gls)
2007–2009	Rapid Ghidighici	65	(12)
2010	Sfântul Gheorghe	12	(3)
2010–2011	Ursidos Chișinău	?	(?)
2011	Milsami Orhei	7	(0)
2012	Academia Chișinău	12	(2)
2012	Intersport-Aroma	?	(?)
2013–2014	Saxan Gagauz Yeri	22	(14)
2014–2015	Spicul Chișcăreni	?	(30)
2015–2016	Saxan Gagauz Yeri	15	(5)
2016	Academia Chișinău	11	(2)
2016–2017	Brașov	22	(6)
2017–2020	Sfântul Gheorghe	87	(14)
2021	Focșani	5	(0)
2021–2023	Milsami Orhei	44	(16)

International career
2015	Moldova	3	(0)
- * Club domestic league appearances and goals

Sergiu Istrati (born 7 August 1988) is a Moldovan former footballer who played as a forward.

== Career ==
He signed for Milsami Orhei in summer 2021.
