= Nadrey Dago =

Ivorian footballer

Personal information
- Full name: Nadrey Ange Stephane Dago
- Date of birth: 7 May 1997 (age 29)
- Place of birth: Attécoubé, Ivory Coast
- Height: 1.75 m (5 ft 9 in)
- Position: Winger

Team information
- Current team: Levadiakos
- Number: 7

Senior career*
Years	Team	Apps	(Gls)
2018–2019	Sesvete	22	(3)
2019–2021	Osijek II	25	(8)
2020–2021	→ Dugopolje (loan)	11	(3)
2021	Sheriff Tiraspol	35	(10)
2022–2023	Panetolikos	29	(3)
2023–	Levadiakos	9	(1)
- * Club domestic league appearances and goals as of 11 May 2024

Nadrey Ange Stephane Dago (born 7 May 1997) is an Ivorian professional footballer who plays as a winger for Greek Super League 2 club Levadiakos.

== Career ==
Born in Attécoubé in the Ivory Coast, Dago's first senior club was Sesvete in the Croatian Second Football League. He joined Osijek's reserve team in 2019. For the first half of the 2020–21 season, he played for Dugopolje.

On 3 February 2021, Dago signed for Moldovan National Division club FC Sheriff Tiraspol. On 14 January 2022, Sheriff Tiraspol confirmed that Dago had left the club. On 31 January 2022, Dago signed for Panetolikos.
