= Petru Ojog =

Moldovan footballer

Personal information
- Full name: Petru Ojog
- Date of birth: 17 July 1990 (age 36)
- Place of birth: Chișinău, Moldovan SSR, Soviet Union
- Height: 1.76 m (5 ft 9 1/2 in)
- Position: Midfielder

Senior career*
| Years | Team | Apps | (Gls) |
| 2009–2011 | Sfântul Gheorghe | 51 | (4) |
| 2011–2013 | Academia Chișinău | 36 | (2) |
| 2013 | Iskra-Stal | 7 | (0) |
| 2013–2014 | Costuleni | 36 | (3) |
| 2015–2016 | Spartak Varna | | |
| 2016–2017 | Academia Chișinău | 3 | (0) |
| 2017 | Spicul Chișcăreni | 17 | (0) |
| 2018–2023 | Sfântul Gheorghe | 114 | (5) |
| 2023–2024 | FC Olimp | 2 | (0) |
- * Club domestic league appearances and goals as of 18 December 2024

Petru Ojog (born 17 July 1990) is a Moldovan former footballer who played as a midfielder. The FMF Ethics Commission made two decisions for participation in fixed matches in the Moldovan championship: disqualifying for 15 years the former player and president of Sfântul Gheorghe Petru Ojog, and for 1 year the player Igor Bondarenko.
