= Artiom Litveacov =

Moldovan footballer

Personal information
- Full name: Artiom Litveacov
- Date of birth: 26 October 1996 (age 30)
- Place of birth: Bender, Moldova
- Height: 1.85 m (6 ft 1 in)
- Position: Defender

Team information
- Current team: Ravshan Kulob

Youth career
- –2014: Sheriff Tiraspol

Senior career*
Years	Team	Apps	(Gls)
2014–2015	Dinamo-Auto	3	(0)
2016	Speranța Nisporeni		
2017–2019	Tighina		
2020	Andijon	11	(0)
2020–2021	Dinamo-Auto	23	(4)
2021–2022	Sfîntul Gheorghe	30	(0)
2023	Dinamo Brest	23	(0)
2024	Nejmeh	11	(0)
2024	Kyzylzhar	3	(0)
2025–	Ravshan Kulob		

International career^{‡}
2022–	Moldova	2	(0)
- * Club domestic league appearances and goals as of 14 March 2025 ‡ National team caps and goals as of 21 January 2022

Artiom Litveacov (born 26 October 1996) is a Moldovan footballer who plays as a defender for Ravshan Kulob.

== Career ==
In June 2021, Litveacov signed for Sfîntul Gheorghe.

On 30 January 2024, Nejmeh announced the signing of Litveacov.

On 17 February 2025, Tajikistan Higher League club Ravshan Kulob announced the signing of Litveacov. The post welcoming Litveacov to Ravshan Kulob was later deleted and Litveacov wasn't included in Ravshan's squad list for the season when announced on 6 March 2025.

== Honours ==
Nejmeh

- Lebanese Premier League: 2023–24
