= Lovro Bizjak =

Slovenian footballer (born 1993)

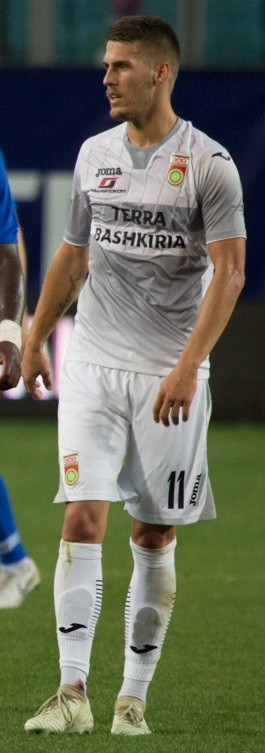
- Bizjak with Ufa in 2018

Personal information
- Date of birth: 12 November 1993 (age 33)
- Place of birth: Šmartno ob Paki, Slovenia
- Height: 1.84 m (6 ft 0 in)
- Position: Forward

Youth career
- Mozirje
- Šmartno 1928

Senior career*
Years	Team	Apps	(Gls)
2011–2013	Šmartno 1928	36	(13)
2013	→ Kovinar Štore (loan)	3	(0)
2014	SV Wildon	15	(2)
2014–2017	Aluminij	73	(27)
2017–2018	Domžale	36	(13)
2018–2021	Ufa	52	(5)
2021–2022	Sheriff Tiraspol	19	(11)
2022–2024	Celje	32	(4)
2024	Kustošija	7	(1)
2025	Lokomotiv Plovdiv	13	(1)

International career
2020	Slovenia	1	(0)
- * Club domestic league appearances and goals as of 26 June 2025

Lovro Bizjak (born 12 November 1993) is a Slovenian footballer who plays as a forward.

== Club career ==
On 14 August 2018, Bizjak signed a four-year contract with the Russian Premier League club Ufa. Twelve days earlier he scored against Ufa for his previous club Domžale in the UEFA Europa League qualifying game, where Ufa advanced to the next round due to away goals rule.

He made his Russian Premier League debut for Ufa on 20 August 2018 in a game against Dynamo Moscow. On 15 January 2021, his contract with Ufa was terminated by mutual consent.

On 29 January 2021, Bizjak joined Moldovan side Sheriff Tiraspol, only to return to Slovenia to sign for Celje in February 2022.

== International career ==
Bizjak made his only appearance for Slovenia in an October 2020 Nations League match against Moldova, coming on as a 77th-minute substitute for Haris Vučkić.
