= 2021–22 Moldovan National Division =

Divizia Națională
- Season: 2021–22
- Dates: 1 July 2021 – 14 May 2022
- Champions: Sheriff; 20th title
- Relegated: Florești
- Champions League: Sheriff
- Conference League: Petrocub; Milsami; Sf. Gheorghe
- Matches: 112
- Goals: 343 (3.06 per match)
- Top goalscorer: Vladimir Ambros (17 goals)
- Best goalkeeper: Georgios Athanasiadis (13 clean sheets)
- Biggest home win: Sheriff 7–0 Dinamo-Auto (28 November 2021)
- Biggest away win: Dinamo-Auto 0–7 Sheriff (25 September 2021)
- Highest scoring: Sheriff 7–1 Dinamo-Auto (7 August 2021)
- Longest winning run: 9 matches Sheriff
- Longest unbeaten run: 18 matches Sheriff
- Longest winless run: 28 matches Florești
- Longest losing run: 28 matches Florești

The 2021–22 Moldovan National Division (Romanian: Divizia Națională) was the 31st season of top-tier football in Moldova. The season started on 1 July 2021 and ended on 14 May 2022. Sheriff Tiraspol were the defending champions. The winners of the league this season earned a spot in the first qualifying round of the 2022–23 UEFA Champions League, and the second, third and fourth placed clubs earned a place in the first qualifying round of the 2022–23 UEFA Europa Conference League.

== Teams ==
A total of 8 teams are competing in the league. These include 7 teams from the 2020–21 season and one promoted team from the "A" Division: Bălți.

=== Changes ===
Bălți (promoted after a two-year absence) were promoted from the "A" Division. Dacia Buiucani (relegated after one year in the top flight) and Codru Lozova (relegated after two years in the top flight) were relegated to "A" Division. Additionally, Speranța Nisporeni were expelled from the league, and thus ending their six-year stay in the top flight.

Team	Place	Ground	Capacity	Coach
Bălți	Bălți	Bălți Stadium	7,000	(Moldova) Serghei Cebotari
Dinamo-Auto	Tiraspol	Dinamo-Auto Stadium	1,300	(Russia) Igor Dobrovolski
Florești	Florești	Bender Stadium	5,000	(Moldova) Iurie Groșev
Milsami	Orhei	CSR Orhei	3,000	(Moldova) Serghei Dubrovin
Petrocub	Hîncești	Hîncești Stadium	1,200	(Moldova) Lilian Popescu
Sfîntul Gheorghe	Suruceni	Zimbru-2 Stadium	1,500	(Moldova) Nicolai Mandrîcenco
Sheriff	Tiraspol	Sheriff Stadium	12,726	(Ukraine) Yuriy Vernydub
Zimbru	Chișinău	Zimbru Stadium	10,400	(Italy) Michele Bon

=== Managerial changes ===
Team	Outgoing manager	Manner of departure	Date of vacancy	Position in table	Replaced by	Date of appointment
Sfîntul Gheorghe	(Moldova) Serghei Cebotari	Resigned	27 September 2021	6th	(Moldova) Stanislav Luca	28 September 2021
Zimbru	(Moldova) Vlad Goian	Demoted to assistant coach	18 November 2021	7th	(Italy) Michele Bon	18 November 2021
Bălți	(Ukraine) Ihor Rakhayev	Resigned	2 December 2021	6th	(Moldova) Serghei Cebotari	10 January 2022
Sheriff	(Ukraine) Yuriy Vernydub	Temporary leave to join Ukrainian Army	28 February 2022	1st	(Moldova) Victor Mihailov (caretaker)	1 March 2022
Dinamo-Auto	(Russia) Igor Dobrovolski	UEFA Pro Licence expired on 31.12.2021	13 March 2022	5th	(Moldova) Oleg Bejenar	13 March 2022
Sfîntul Gheorghe	(Moldova) Stanislav Luca	No UEFA Pro Licence	19 March 2022	4th	(Moldova) Nicolai Mandrîcenco	19 March 2022

== League table ==
Pos	Team	Pld	W	D	L	GF	GA	GD	Pts	Qualification or relegation
1	Sheriff Tiraspol (C)	28	22	4	2	75	8	+67	70	Qualification for the Champions League first qualifying round
2	Petrocub Hîncești	28	20	4	4	62	20	+42	64	Qualification for the Europa Conference League first qualifying round
3	Milsami Orhei	28	15	6	7	50	31	+19	51	Qualification for the Europa Conference League first qualifying round
4	Sfîntul Gheorghe	28	10	8	10	38	39	−1	38	Qualification for the Europa Conference League first qualifying round
5	Bălți	28	11	3	14	39	39	0	36	
6	Dinamo-Auto	28	9	5	14	35	72	−37	32	
7	Zimbru Chișinău (O)	28	7	6	15	32	46	−14	27	Qualification to Relegation play-off
8	Florești (R)	28	0	0	28	12	88	−76	−6 (Note: Florești had 6 points deducted for alleged match-fixing.)	Relegation to Liga 1 (Note: On 17 January 2022, Florești were excluded from competition for match-fixing allegations and relegated to the second tier league for next season. All remaining 9 matches were awarded 0–3 against them.)

Source: FMF, UEFA, Soccerway
Rules for classification: 1) Points; 2) Play-off (only if deciding champion when two teams tied); 3) Head-to-head points; 4) Head-to-head goal difference; 5) Head-to-head away goals scored; 6) Head-to-head goals scored; 7) Matches won; 8) Goal difference; 9) Goals scored; 10) Least red cards; 11) Least yellow cards.
(C) Champions; (O) Play-off winners; (R) Relegated

== Results ==
Teams played each other four times (twice at home, twice away).

=== Rounds 1−14 ===
Matches 1−14
Home \ Away	BĂL	DIN	FLO	MIL	PET	SFÎ	SHE	ZIM
Bălți	—	2–4	3–1	0–1	2–4	1–2	0–2	2–1
Dinamo-Auto	1–4	—	1–0	1–3	0–2	2–2	0–7	3–3
Florești	1–3	0–1	—	0–3	0–1	1–5	1–3	1–3
Milsami Orhei	1–1	4–1	4–1	—	2–1	1–1	0–1	1–0
Petrocub Hîncești	3–0	6–1	2–0	1–1	—	5–0	0–2	1–0
Sfîntul Gheorghe	1–1	0–1	4–1	3–4	0–1	—	0–3	1–0
Sheriff Tiraspol	0–1	7–1	4–0	1–0	2–0	4–0	—	6–0
Zimbru Chișinău	2–3	3–0	4–0	0–2	0–1	1–1	1–1	—

Source: FMF, Soccerway
Legend: Blue = home team win; Yellow = draw; Red = away team win.

=== Rounds 15−28 ===
Matches 15−28
Home \ Away	BĂL	DIN	FLO	MIL	PET	SFÎ	SHE	ZIM
Bălți	—	3–0	3–0 (Note: Technical wins/losses)	0–1	1–2	0–0	0–3	1–0
Dinamo-Auto	1–0	—	3–0	2–2	0–0	0–1	0–3	0–0
Florești	0–3	1–5	—	0–3	3–4	0–3	1–3	0–3
Milsami Orhei	0–2	2–5	5–0	—	1–3	2–2	1–1	3–0
Petrocub Hîncești	3–2	5–0	3–0	1–0	—	1–1	0–0	5–1
Sfîntul Gheorghe	1–0	4–0	3–0	2–0	0–4	—	0–2	0–1
Sheriff Tiraspol	2–0	7–0	3–0	0–1	1–0	2–0	—	4–0
Zimbru Chișinău	2–1	1–2	3–0	1–2	0–3	1–1	1–1	—

Source: FMF, Soccerway
Legend: Blue = home team win; Yellow = draw; Red = away team win.

=== Positions by round ===
Team ╲ Round	1	2	3	4	5	6	7	8	9	10	11	12	13	14	15	16	17	18	19	20	21	22	23	24	25	26	27	28
Bălți	3	4	3	2	3	3	3	3	3	3	4	4	4	4	4	5	5	6	6	6	6	6	6	6	6	6	5	5
Dinamo-Auto	7	6	4	5	7	7	7	7	7	7	5	5	6	6	5	6	6	5	5	5	5	5	5	5	5	5	6	6
Florești	8	8	8	8	8	8	8	8	8	8	8	8	8	8	8	8	8	8	8	8	8	8	8	8	8	8	8	8
Milsami Orhei	5	2	1	1	1	1	1	1	1	1	1	1	2	2	2	1	3	3	3	3	3	3	3	3	3	3	3	3
Petrocub Hîncești	2	3	5	3	2	2	2	2	2	2	2	2	1	1	1	2	1	1	2	2	2	2	2	2	2	2	2	2
Sfîntul Gheorghe	4	5	6	7	4	4	4	5	6	5	6	6	5	5	6	4	4	4	4	4	4	4	4	4	4	4	4	4
Sheriff Tiraspol	6	7	7	6	5	5	5	4	4	4	3	3	3	3	3	3	2	2	1	1	1	1	1	1	1	1	1	1
Zimbru Chișinău	1	1	2	4	6	6	6	6	5	6	7	7	7	7	7	7	7	7	7	7	7	7	7	7	7	7	7	7

Source: fmf.md

=== Results by round ===
The following table represents the teams game results in each round.

Team	1	2	3	4	5	6	7	8	9	10	11	12	13	14	15	16	17	18	19	20	21	22	23	24	25	26	27	28
Bălți	W	L	D	W	L	W	W	L	D	L	L	L	W	W	L	L	L	L	L	L	W (Note: Technical win)	L	W	D	W	L	W	W
Dinamo-Auto	L	D	W	L	L	L	L	D	W	W	W	L	L	L	W	L	W	W	L	D	W	D	L	W	L	L	L	D
Florești	L	L	L	L	L	L	L	L	L	L	L	L	L	L	L	L	L	L	L	L (Note: Technical loss)	L	L	L	L	L	L	L	L
Milsami Orhei	D	W	W	W	W	W	W	D	D	W	W	L	W	D	W	L	W	W	L	W	L	L	L	L	W	W	D	D
Petrocub Hîncești	W	L	W	W	W	W	W	L	D	W	W	W	W	W	L	W	D	W	D	D	W	W	L	W	W	W	W	W
Sfîntul Gheorghe	D	D	D	L	W	W	L	L	W	L	D	W	L	D	W	W	D	D	L	W	L	W	W	D	L	L	W	L
Sheriff Tiraspol	L	W	W	W	W	D	W	W	W	W	W	W	W	W	W	D	W	W	W	L	W	W	W	D	W	W	D	W
Zimbru Chișinău	W	W	L	L	L	L	D	W	D	L	D	L	L	L	W	L	L	D	L	W	L	D	W	D	L	W	L	L

== Relegation play-off ==
A play-off match was played between the seventh-placed team from Divizia Națională and the fourth-placed team from Divizia A for one place in the next season. The "home" team (for administrative purposes) was determined in a draw held on 19 May 2022.

26 May 2022
19:00 EEST

Spartanii Selemet	0–1	Zimbru Chișinău
	Report	O. Gomes 17'

Municipal Stadium, Hîncești
Attendance: 580
Referee: Petru Stoianov

== Season statistics ==
=== Top goalscorers ===
Rank	Player	Club	Goals
1	(Moldova) Vladimir Ambros	Petrocub	17
2	(Moldova) Sergiu Istrati	Milsami	15
3	(Guinea) Momo Yansané	Sheriff	11
3	(Moldova) Mihai Plătică	Petrocub	11
5	(Nigeria) Emmanuel Alaribe	Bălți	8
5	(Mali) Adama Traoré	Sheriff	8
7	(Moldova) Victor Stînă	Sf. Gheorghe	7
7	(Ukraine) Artem Fedorov	Petrocub (2) & Dinamo-Auto (5)	7
7	(Ukraine) Serhii Molochko	Bălți	7
7	(Moldova) Nichita Moțpan	Bălți	7

==== Hat-tricks ====
Player	Home	Away	Result	Date
(Moldova) Artiom Puntus	Milsami	Dinamo-Auto	4–1	21 August 2021
(Moldova) Radu Gînsari	Sf. Gheorghe	Milsami	3–4	25 August 2021
(Moldova) Vladimir Ambros	Petrocub	Bălți	3–0	26 September 2021
(Guinea) Momo Yansané	Sheriff	Zimbru	4–0	11 December 2021
(Moldova) Vladimir Ambros	Petrocub	Dinamo-Auto	5–0	8 May 2022

=== Clean sheets ===
Rank	Player	Club	Clean sheets
1	(Greece) Georgios Athanasiadis	Sheriff	13
2	(Moldova) Emil Tîmbur	Milsami	8
3	(Moldova) Igor Mostovei	Petrocub	6
3	(Portugal) Mickaël Meira	Petrocub	6
3	(Moldova) Nicolae Calancea	Sf. Gheorghe	6
6	(Moldova) Victor Străistari	Bălți	4
6	(Moldova) Maxim Bardîș	Dinamo-Auto	4
8	(Ghana) Razak Abalora	Sheriff	3
8	(Moldova) Silviu Șmalenea	Zimbru	3
10	(Serbia) Dušan Marković	Sheriff	2
10	(Moldova) Cristian Apostolachi	Dinamo-Auto	2
