= Stadionul Municipal (Bălți) =

Football stadium in Bălți, Moldova

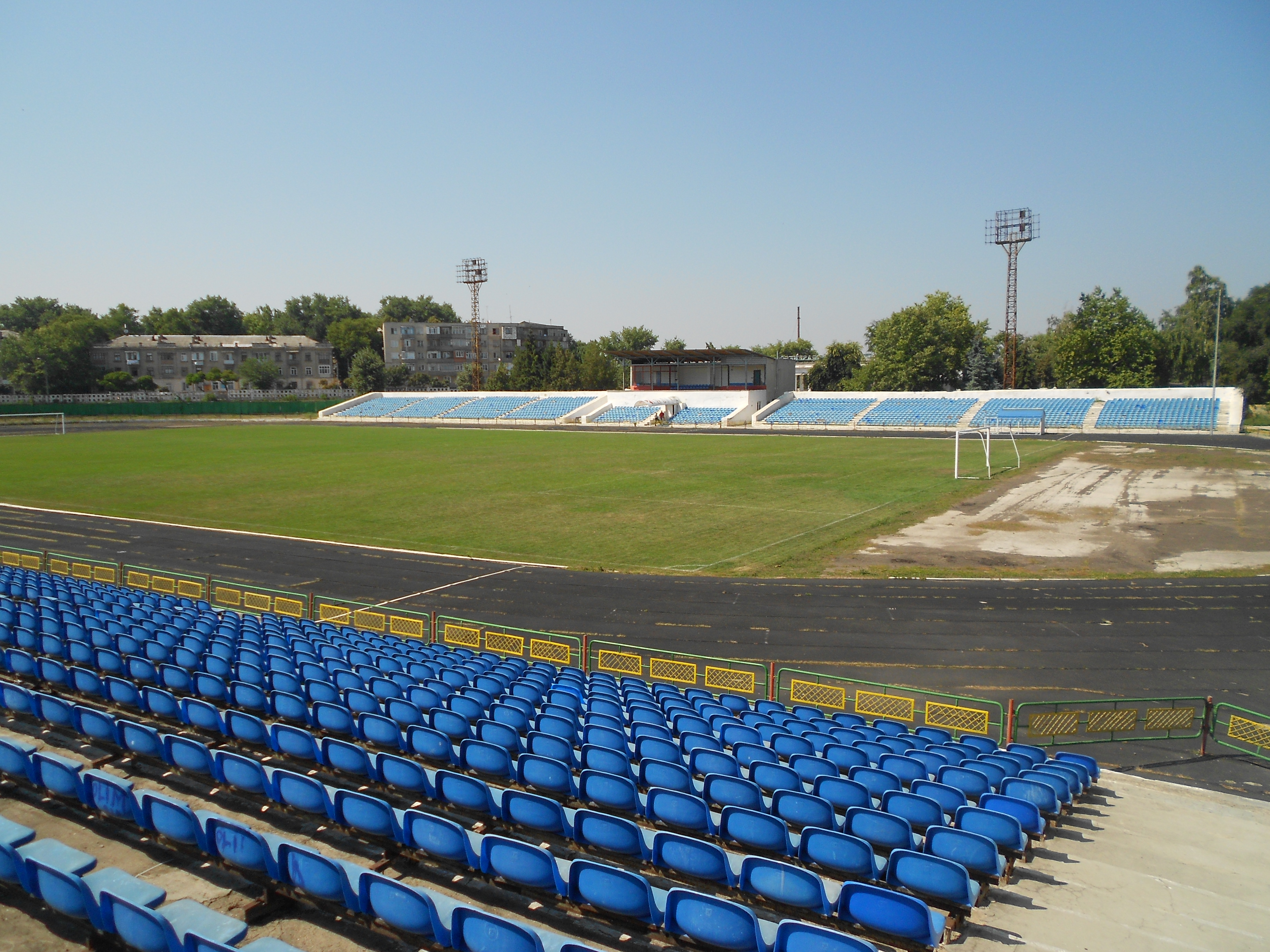
- The stadium in 2011
- Interactive map of Stadionul Municipal
- Full name: Stadionul Municipal Bălți
- Address: 155 Kyiv Street; Bălți; Moldova
- Coordinates: 47.76621°N 27.9332°E
- Capacity: 5,200
- Surface: Grass
- Field size: 105 x 68 m

Construction
- Opened: 1955

Tenant
- Bălți

Stadionul Municipal, is a multi-use stadium in Bălți, Moldova. It is currently used mostly for football matches and is the home ground of Moldovan Liga club Bălți. The stadium holds 5,200 people.
