= 2020–21 FC Sheriff Tiraspol season =

Sheriff Tiraspol
2020–21 season
- Chairman: Viktor Gushan
- Manager: Zoran Zekić (until 21 October); Victor Mihailov (Caretaker) (21 October – 18 December); Yuriy Vernydub (from 18 December)
- Stadium: Sheriff Stadium
- Divizia Naţională: Champions
- 2019–20 Moldovan Cup: Semi-final
- 2020–21 Moldovan Cup: Runners Up
- Champions League: Second qualifying round
- Europa League: Third qualifying round
- Top goalscorer: League: Frank Castañeda (28); All: Frank Castañeda (33)
Home colours	Away colours

The 2020–21 season is FC Sheriff Tiraspol's 24th season, and their 23rd in the Divizia Naţională, the top-flight of Moldovan football. Sheriff are defending Divizia Naţională and Moldovan Cup champions and they will also take part in the Champions League First Qualifying Round.

== Season events ==
On 10 March, the Moldovan Football Federation delayed the start of the 2020 season due to the COVID-19 pandemic until 4 April 2020. On 30 March, all football in Moldova was suspended for the foreseeable future.

On 18 June, the Moldovan Football Federation announced that the 2019–20 Moldovan Cup would restart on 21 June, whilst the Divizia Națională would commence on 3 July. The following day, Sheriff Tiraspol's Moldovan Cup games where confirmed for 21 & 25 June.

On 14 August, the Divizia Națională was postponed.

On 17 August, Sheriff Tiraspol signed Shahrom Samiyev from Rubin Kazan, before immediately loaning him out to Dinamo-Auto Tiraspol until the end of the year. On the same day, Sheriff Tiraspol also announced the signing of Keston Julien from AS Trenčín.

On 4 September, Sheriff Tiraspol announced the signing of Dabney dos Santos.

On 21 October, Zoran Zekić's contract was terminated by mutual consent, with Victor Mihailov being placed in temporary charge.

On 28 November, the Divizia Națională was suspended due to the COVID-19 pandemic in Moldova.

On 18 December, Yuriy Vernydub was announced as Sheriff Tiraspol's new manager.

On 29 December, Captain Veaceslav Posmac signed a new extended contract with Sheriff Tiraspol.

On 18 January, Sheriff Tiraspol announced the signing of Sébastien Thill on loan from Progrès Niederkorn.

On 28 January, Vadim Paireli left the club to sign for Armenian club FC Noah, whilst Lovro Bizjak joined Sheriff Tiraspol on 29 January after previously playing for Ufa.

On 1 February, Sheriff Tiraspol announced the signing of Danilo Arboleda from Deportivo Pasto.

On 3 February, Sheriff Tiraspol announced the signing of Nadrey Dago from Osijek.

On 4 February, Sheriff Tiraspol announced the signing of Dušan Marković from Rad.

On 6 February, Sheriff Tiraspol announced the signing of Gustavo Dulanto from Boavista.

On 8 February, Sheriff Tiraspol announced the signing of Fernando from Botafogo. The following day, Sheriff Tiraspol announced the signing of Peter Banda on loan from Big Bullets, with Adama Traoré joining the following day from Metz on 10 February. On 11 February, Sheriff Tiraspol announced the signing of Stjepan Radeljić from Osijek.

On 15 March, Sheriff Tiraspol announced the signing of Moussa Kyabou from USC Kita.

On 20 March, the Divizia Națională was postponed for a third time.

== Squad ==
As of match played 30 May 2021

No.	Name	Nationality	Position	Date of birth (age)	Signed from	Signed in	Contract ends	Apps.	Goals
Goalkeepers
1	Dumitru Celeadnic	(Moldova)	GK	23 April 1992 (aged 29)	Petrocub Hîncești	2019		46	0
26	Dušan Marković	(Serbia)	GK	3 April 1998 (aged 23)	Rad	2021		13	0
33	Serghei Pașcenco	(Moldova)	GK	18 December 1982 (aged 38)	Zaria Bălți	2018		127+	0
Defenders
2	Danilo Arboleda	(Colombia)	DF	16 May 1995 (aged 26)	Deportivo Pasto	2020		14	0
3	Charles Petro	(Malawi)	DF	8 February 2001 (aged 20)	Big Bullets	2020		27	1
6	Stjepan Radeljić	(Bosnia and Herzegovina)	DF	5 September 1997 (aged 23)	loan from Osijek	2021	2021	15	0
8	Alexandr Belousov	(Moldova)	DF	14 May 1998 (aged 23)	Academy	2018		51	4
13	Fernando	(Brazil)	DF	29 November 1998 (aged 22)	Botafogo	2021		17	0
15	Cristiano	(Brazil)	DF	29 August 1993 (aged 27)	Volta Redonda	2018		136	3
16	Keston Julien	(Trinidad and Tobago)	DF	26 October 1998 (aged 22)	AS Trenčín	2020		17	1
32	Valeriu Gaiu	(Moldova)	DF	6 February 2001 (aged 20)	Academy	2020		19	0
55	Gustavo Dulanto	(Peru)	DF	5 September 1995 (aged 25)	Boavista	2021		14	2
90	Veaceslav Posmac	(Moldova)	DF	7 November 1990 (aged 30)	Dacia Chișinău	2017		119	7
Midfielders
4	Adrian Khatman	(Moldova)	MF	1 May 2003 (aged 18)	Academy	2021		1	0
7	Andriy Bliznichenko	(Ukraine)	MF	24 July 1994 (aged 26)	Kardemir Karabükspor	2019		24	12
9	Adama Traoré	(Mali)	MF	5 June 1995 (aged 25)	Metz	2021		18	10
17	Dimitris Kolovos	(Greece)	MF	27 April 1993 (aged 28)	loan from Panathinaikos	2020		26	12
18	Moussa Kyabou	(Mali)	MF	18 April 1998 (aged 23)	USC Kita	2021		11	0
19	Dabney dos Santos	(Netherlands)	MF	31 July 1996 (aged 24)	Heracles Almelo	2020		7	0
31	Sébastien Thill	(Luxembourg)	MF	29 December 1993 (aged 27)	loan from Progrès Niederkorn	2021	2021	17	4
88	Rifet Kapić	(Bosnia and Herzegovina)	MF	3 July 1995 (aged 25)	loan from SC Paderborn	2020		51	9
98	Maxim Cojocaru	(Moldova)	MF	13 January 1998 (aged 23)	Petrocub Hîncești	2019		37	4
Forwards
10	Frank Castañeda	(Colombia)	FW	17 July 1994 (aged 26)	Senica	2020		44	33
11	Lovro Bizjak	(Slovenia)	FW	12 November 1993 (aged 27)	Ufa	2021		19	9
23	Nadrey Dago	(Ivory Coast)	FW	7 May 1997 (aged 24)	Osijek	2021		16	5
24	Eugeniu Gliga	(Moldova)	FW	30 January 2001 (aged 20)	Academy	2020		7	0
27	Peter Banda	(Malawi)	FW	22 September 2000 (aged 20)	loan from Big Bullets	2021		16	5
43	Richard Gadze	(Ghana)	FW	23 August 1994 (aged 26)	Zira	2020		19	5
Out on loan
	Vadim Dijinari	(Moldova)	DF	1 April 1999 (aged 22)	Youth Team	2019		5	2
	Shahrom Samiyev	(Tajikistan)	FW	8 February 2001 (aged 20)	Rubin Kazan	2020		0	0
Left during the season
4	Matej Palčič	(Slovenia)	DF	21 June 1993 (aged 27)	Wisła Kraków	2019		6	0
6	Alec Mudimu	(Zimbabwe)	MF	8 April 1995 (aged 26)	Cefn Druids	2020		6	1
8	Max Veloso	(Switzerland)	MF	27 March 1992 (aged 29)	Neuchâtel Xamax	2020		7	2
9	Peter Wilson	(Liberia)	FW	9 October 1996 (aged 24)	GIF Sundsvall	2020		19	7
11	Andrei Peteleu	(Romania)	DF	20 August 1992 (aged 28)	CFR Cluj	2020		11	0
14	Sebastian Dahlström	(Finland)	MF	5 November 1996 (aged 24)	HJK	2020		16	1
18	William Parra	(Colombia)	MF	1 March 1995 (aged 26)	loan from Independiente Medellín	2020		23	3
20	Zvonimir Mikulić	(Croatia)	GK	5 February 1990 (aged 31)	Osijek	2017		67	0
27	Liridon Latifi	(Albania)	MF	6 February 1994 (aged 27)	loan from Puskás Akadémia	2019	2020	19	5
44	Andrej Lukić	(Croatia)	DF	2 April 1994 (aged 27)	loan from Braga	2019		34	5
55	Benedik Mioč	(Croatia)	MF	6 October 1994 (aged 26)	NK Osijek	2020		16	0
70	Faith Obilor	(Nigeria)	DF	5 March 1991 (aged 30)	HJK	2020		21	0
76	Gabrijel Boban	(Croatia)	FW	23 July 1989 (aged 31)	NK Osijek	2019		29	9
77	Anatole Abang	(Cameroon)	FW	6 July 1996 (aged 24)	Nantong Zhiyun	2020		12	6
91	Ousmane N'Diaye	(Senegal)	DF	19 August 1991 (aged 29)	Osmanlıspor	2019		33	3
	Mihail Ghecev	(Moldova)	MF	5 November 1997 (aged 23)	Petrocub Hîncești	2019		10	5
	Vadim Paireli	(Moldova)	MF	8 November 1995 (aged 25)	Academy	2013		68	6

=== Out on loan ===
Note: Flags indicate national team as defined under FIFA eligibility rules; some limited exceptions apply. Players may hold more than one non-FIFA nationality.

No.	Pos.	Nation	Player
—	DF	MDA	Vadim Dijinari (at Dinamo-Auto Tiraspol until end of season)
—	FW	TJK	Shahrom Samiyev (at Dinamo-Auto Tiraspol until end of season)

== Transfers ==
=== In ===
Date	Position	Nationality	Name	From	Fee	Ref.
9 December 2019†	FW	(Liberia)	Peter Wilson	GIF Sundsvall	Undisclosed	
11 December 2019†	MF	(Zimbabwe)	Alec Mudimu	Cefn Druids	Undisclosed	
18 December 2019†	MF	(Finland)	Sebastian Dahlström	HJK	Undisclosed	
30 December 2019†	FW	(Colombia)	Frank Castañeda	Senica	Undisclosed	
16 January 2020	MF	(Switzerland)	Max Veloso	Neuchâtel Xamax	Undisclosed	
20 January 2020	DF	(Nigeria)	Faith Obilor	HJK	Free	
21 January 2020	MF	(Croatia)	Benedik Mioč	NK Osijek	Undisclosed	
31 January 2020	DF	(Romania)	Andrei Peteleu	CFR Cluj	Undisclosed	
6 February 2020	FW	(Cameroon)	Anatole Abang	Nantong Zhiyun	Undisclosed	
12 February 2020	DF	(Malawi)	Charles Petro	Big Bullets	Undisclosed	
7 August 2020	FW	(Ghana)	Richard Gadze	Zira	Undisclosed	
17 August 2020	DF	(Trinidad and Tobago)	Keston Julien	AS Trenčín	Undisclosed	
17 August 2020	FW	(Tajikistan)	Shahrom Samiyev	Rubin Kazan	Undisclosed	
4 September 2020	MF	(Netherlands)	Dabney dos Santos	Heracles Almelo	Undisclosed	
29 January 2021	FW	(Slovenia)	Lovro Bizjak	Ufa	Free	
1 February 2021	DF	(Colombia)	Danilo Arboleda	Deportivo Pasto	Undisclosed	
3 February 2021	FW	(Ivory Coast)	Nadrey Dago	Osijek	Undisclosed	
4 February 2021	GK	(Serbia)	Dušan Marković	Rad	Undisclosed	
6 February 2021	DF	(Peru)	Gustavo Dulanto	Boavista	Undisclosed	
8 February 2021	DF	(Brazil)	Fernando	Botafogo	Undisclosed	
10 February 2021	MF	(Mali)	Adama Traoré	Metz	Undisclosed	
15 March 2021	MF	(Mali)	Moussa Kyabou	USC Kita	Undisclosed	

† Transfers announced on the above date, but not finalised until 20 January 2020.

=== Loans in ===
Date from	Position	Nationality	Name	From	Date to	Ref.
24 June 2019	MF	(Albania)	Liridon Latifi	Puskás Akadémia	12 July 2020	
1 August 2019	DF	(Croatia)	Andrej Lukić	Braga	31 December 2020	
20 December 2019†	MF	(Colombia)	William Parra	Independiente Medellín	31 December 2020	
11 August 2020	MF	(Bosnia and Herzegovina)	Rifet Kapić	SC Paderborn	End of season	
14 September 2020	MF	(Greece)	Dimitris Kolovos	Panathinaikos	End of season	
18 January 2021	MF	(Luxembourg)	Sébastien Thill	Progrès Niederkorn	End of season	
9 February 2021	FW	(Malawi)	Peter Banda	Big Bullets	31 July 2021	
11 February 2021	DF	(Bosnia and Herzegovina)	Stjepan Radeljić	Osijek	31 December 2021	

=== Out ===
Date	Position	Nationality	Name	To	Fee	Ref.
13 February 2020	MF	(Poland)	Ariel Borysiuk	Jagiellonia Białystok	Undisclosed	
21 January 2021	MF	(Zimbabwe)	Alec Mudimu	Ankaraspor	Undisclosed	
28 January 2021	MF	(Moldova)	Vadim Paireli	Noah	Undisclosed	
5 February 2021	FW	(Liberia)	Peter Wilson	Podbeskidzie	Undisclosed	
19 February 2021	MF	(Moldova)	Mihail Ghecev	Noah Jurmala	Undisclosed	

=== Loans out ===
Date from	Position	Nationality	Name	To	Date to	Ref.
14 February 2020	MF	(Moldova)	Mihail Ghecev	Sfântul Gheorghe	31 December 2020	
9 April 2020	DF	(Moldova)	Alexandr Belousov	Dinamo-Auto Tiraspol	31 December 2020	
3 July 2020	MF	(Moldova)	Vadim Paireli	Dinamo-Auto Tiraspol	28 January 2021	
17 August 2020	FW	(Tajikistan)	Shahrom Samiyev	Dinamo-Auto Tiraspol	End of season	

=== Released ===
Date	Position	Nationality	Name	Joined	Date	Ref.
7 July 2020	DF	(Slovenia)	Matej Palčič	Koper		
10 September 2020	FW	(Cameroon)	Anatole Abang	Keşla	26 December 2020	
10 September 2020	FW	(Croatia)	Gabrijel Boban	Varaždin		
31 December 2020	DF	(Nigeria)	Faith Obilor	Taraz	20 February 2021	
31 December 2020	DF	(Romania)	Andrei Peteleu	UTA Arad		
31 December 2020	DF	(Senegal)	Ousmane N'Diaye	Kaisar	1 March 2021	
31 December 2020	MF	(Croatia)	Benedik Mioč	Hrvatski Dragovoljac	6 August 2021	
31 December 2020	MF	(Switzerland)	Max Veloso	Neuchâtel Xamax	25 June 2021	
12 January 2021	GK	(Croatia)	Zvonimir Mikulić	Levski Sofia	12 January 2021	
22 February 2021	MF	(Finland)	Sebastian Dahlström	HJK Helsinki	21 April 2021	
30 June 2021	MF	(Netherlands)	Dabney dos Santos			
30 June 2021	FW	(Ghana)	Richard Gadze	Bnei Sakhnin		
30 June 2021	FW	(Tajikistan)	Shahrom Samiev	Torpedo-BelAZ Zhodino	2 July 2021	

== Friendlies ==
1 February 2020	Sheriff Tiraspol (Moldova)	5–0	(Ukraine) Balkany Zorya	Tiraspol
14:00 EET (UTC+2)	Boban (1st Half); Trialist (1st Half); Bliznichenko (2nd Half); Castañeda (2nd Half)	Report	Goal

5 February 2020	Sheriff Tiraspol	4–0	Dinamo-Auto Tiraspol	Tiraspol
EET (UTC+2)	Wilson (1st Half); Cristiano (1st Half); Obilor (1st Half); Latifi (2nd Half)	Report

8 February 2020	Sheriff Tiraspol	5–0	Cahul-2005	Tiraspol
EET (UTC+2)	Lukić (1st Half) (1st Half); Wilson (2nd Half) (2nd Half) (2nd Half)	Report

12 February 2020	Sheriff Tiraspol	6–1	Tighina	Tiraspol
EET (UTC+2)	Peteleu; Veloso; Abang; Cojocaru; Wilson	Report	Goal

16 February 2020	Sheriff Tiraspol (Moldova)	0–0	(Ukraine) Rukh Lviv	Belek, Turkey
EET (UTC+2)		Report

19 February 2020	Sheriff Tiraspol (Moldova)	1–0	(Estonia) Levadia Tallinn	Belek, Turkey
16:00 EET (UTC+2)	N'Diaye 13'	Report

22 February 2020	Sheriff Tiraspol (Moldova)	0–2	(Russia) Rubin Kazan	Belek, Turkey
11:00 EET (UTC+2)	(red card) 60'	Report	Kvaratskhelia 11'; Bakayev 47'

26 February 2020	Sheriff Tiraspol (Moldova)	2–0	(Latvia) Spartaks Jūrmala	Belek, Turkey
EET (UTC+2)	Cristiano 8'; Lukić 62'	Report

28 February 2020	Sheriff Tiraspol (Moldova)	3–0	(Ukraine) Volyn Lutsk	Belek, Turkey
EET (UTC+2)	Wilson; Paireli	Report

29 February 2020	Sheriff Tiraspol (Moldova)	3–3	(Turkmenistan) Altyn Asyr	Belek, Turkey
EET (UTC+2)	Latifi 8'; Cristiano (pen.); Castañeda	Report	(pen.)

== Competitions ==
=== Divizia Națională ===
==== Results summary ====
Overall								Home						Away					
Pld	W	D	L	GF	GA	GD	Pts	W	D	L	GF	GA	GD	W	D	L	GF	GA	GD
36	32	3	1	116	7	+109	99	15	3	0	65	3	+62	17	0	1	51	4	+47

Last updated: 26 May 2021.
Source: See Results

==== Results ====
3 July 2020 1	Sheriff Tiraspol	2–0	Speranța Nisporeni	Tiraspol
20:30 EEST (UTC+3)	Boban 29'; Peteleu (yellow card) 76'; Bliznichenko 90'	Report	Calugher (yellow card) 79'; I.Tiehi (yellow card) 80'	Stadium: Sheriff Stadium; Referee: Gabriel Tupichko

8 July 2020 2	Sfântul Gheorghe	0–1	Sheriff Tiraspol	Suruceni
18:00 EEST (UTC+3)	Volkov (yellow card) 33'; Istrati (yellow card) 44'	Report	Bliznichenko (yellow card) 39'; Parra 74'	Stadium: Suruceni Stadium; Referee: Andrey Bregute

11 July 2020 3	Sheriff Tiraspol	6–0	Codru Lozova	Tiraspol
20:30 EEST (UTC+3)	Castañeda 11', 45'; Parra 19'; Bliznichenko 32'; Mudimu 41'; Wilson 47'; E.Gliga (yellow card) 86'	Report	A.Ciuntu (yellow card) 24'; Dhamo (yellow card) 88'	Stadium: Malaya Sportivnaya Arena; Referee: Alexander Stefchuk

17 July 2020 4	Sheriff Tiraspol	2–0	Zimbru Chișinău	Tiraspol
20:30 EEST (UTC+3)	Castañeda 53'; Abang 87'	Report	V.Zavalișca (yellow card) 40'; Traoré (yellow card) 60'	Stadium: Malaya Sportivnaya Arena; Referee: Vyacheslav Banar

23 July 2020 5	Milsami Orhei	0–1	Sheriff Tiraspol	Orhei
20:30 EEST (UTC+3)	Gaye (yellow card) 32'; I.Ghimp (yellow card) 38'; Iurașco (yellow card) 77'	Report	Mudimu (yellow card) 21'; Castañeda 42' (pen.); Boban (yellow card) 51'; Gaiu (yellow card) 53'; Parra (yellow card) 71'; Abang (yellow card) 78'; Obilor (yellow card) 80'; Petro (yellow card) 90+3'	Stadium: CSR Orhei; Referee: Andrei Breguta

26 July 2020 6	Sheriff Tiraspol	6–0	Dinamo-Auto Tiraspol	Tiraspol
20:30 EEST (UTC+3)	Wilson 23'; Mudimu (yellow card) 34'; Castañeda 44' (yellow card) 46'; Abang 61', 76', 84'; Mioč (yellow card) 67'; N'Diaye 74'	Report	Fedorov (yellow card) 30' (yellow-red card) 70'; N.Solodovnicov (yellow card) 89'	Stadium: Sheriff Stadium; Referee: Igor Boshka

1 August 2020 7	Florești	0–1	Sheriff Tiraspol	Bender
18:00 EEST (UTC+3)	Maneacov (yellow card) 75'	Report	Obilor (yellow card) 29'; Wilson (yellow card) 51'; Abang 62'; Dahlström (yellow card) 68'	Stadium: Dinamo Stadium; Referee: Roman Zhitar

5 August 2020 8	Sheriff Tiraspol	4–1	Petrocub Hîncești	Tiraspol
20:30 EEST (UTC+3)	Boban 27', 42'; Abang (yellow card) 47'; Castañeda 60'; Petro 64'; Obilor (yellow card) 74'	Report	Rozgoniuc (yellow card) 35'; Taras 52'; Damașcan (yellow card) 86'; Gulceac (yellow card) 89'	Stadium: Sheriff Stadium; Referee: Gabriel Tupicco

12 September 2020 9	Dacia Buiucani	0–3	Sheriff Tiraspol	Chișinău
17:00 EEST (UTC+3)	I.Gurulea (yellow card) 80'; Lungu (yellow card) 84'	Report	Castañeda 1' (penalty missed) 31'; Parra (yellow card) 40'; Wilson 70'; Veloso 90'	Stadium: CSCT Buiucani; Referee: Alexander Stefcuk
Note: Match originally scheduled for 15 August 2020.

18 September 2020 10	Speranța Nisporeni	1–2	Sheriff Tiraspol	Orhei
20:30 EEST (UTC+3)	Guyanov (yellow card) 18'; S.Trofan 77'	Report	Castañeda 33'; Gadze 89'	Stadium: CSR Orhei; Referee: Veaceslav Banar
Note: Match played at the CSR Orhei in Orhei, instead of Speranța Nisporeni's regular Stadionul Mircea Eliade in Nisporeni. Match originally scheduled for 21 August 2020.

28 September 2020 12	Sheriff Tiraspol	6–0	Codru Lozova	Tiraspol
16:00 EEST (UTC+3)	Wilson 28'; Gadze 31' (pen.); Mudimu (yellow card) 52'; Veloso 75'; Castañeda 82', 89'; Kolovos 85'; Gaiu (yellow card) 88'	Report	Mytsyk (yellow card) 18'; A.Nestratov (yellow card) 33'	Stadium: Sheriff Stadium; Referee: Igor Bosca

3 October 2020 13	Sheriff Tiraspol	4–0	Zimbru Chișinău	Tiraspol
18:00 EEST (UTC+3)	Julien 28'; Obilor (yellow card) 33'; Castañeda 48'; Gadze 50'; Wilson 87'; Cristiano (yellow card) 89'	Report	Burghiu (yellow card) 19'; S.Yahaya (yellow card) 30'	Stadium: Sheriff Stadium; Referee: Andrei Kozhocaru

17 October 2020 14	Sheriff Tiraspol	1–0	Milsami Orhei	Tiraspol
18:00 EEST (UTC+3)	Gadze 49'; Parra (yellow card) 59'	Report	Gaye (yellow card) (yellow-red card) 26'; Jardan (yellow card) 51'	Stadium: Malaya Sportivnaya Arena; Referee: Gennadiy Sidenco
Note: Match originally scheduled for 12 September 2020, and then 27 September.

20 October 2020 15	Dinamo-Auto Tiraspol	1–2	Sheriff Tiraspol	Tîrnauca
14:00 EEST (UTC+3)	Masalov (yellow card) 24' (yellow-red card) 90+1'; Fedorov 73'	Report	Dahlström 53'; Bliznichenko 89'	Stadium: Dinamo-Auto Stadium; Referee: Vasile Berladian

24 October 2020 16	Sheriff Tiraspol	5–0	Florești	Tiraspol
17:00 EEST (UTC+3)	Castañeda 32'; Kolovos (yellow card) 35' (goal) 54'; Bliznichenko 66', 70', 76'; Posmac (yellow card) 90+1'	Report	D.Semirov (yellow card) 17'; Bugaiov (yellow card) 72'	Stadium: Malaya Sportivnaya Arena; Referee: Yuri Kovtun

1 November 2020 17	Petrocub Hîncești	1–0	Sheriff Tiraspol	Hîncești
17:00 EET (UTC+2)	Bejan 10'	Report	Posmac (yellow card) 56'	Stadium: Stadionul Municipal; Referee: Roman Zhitar

7 November 2020 18	Sheriff Tiraspol	0–0	Dacia Buiucani	Tiraspol
17:00 EET (UTC+2)	Julien (yellow card) 32'	Report	G.Suchu (yellow card) 15'; Lungu (yellow card) 22'	Stadium: Malaya Sportivnaya Arena; Referee: Andrei Cheban

21 November 2020 19	Sheriff Tiraspol	3–0	Speranța Nisporeni	Tiraspol
16:00 EET (UTC+2)	Posmac 5'; Lukić (yellow card) 36'; Wilson 80' (pen.), 88'	Report	Nasonov (yellow card) 79'; Starîș (yellow card) 79'; Chirinciuc (yellow card) 86'	Stadium: Malaya Sportivnaya Arena; Referee: Igor Boshka

25 November 2020 20	Sfântul Gheorghe	0–2	Sheriff Tiraspol	Suruceni
13:00 EET (UTC+2)		Report	Castañeda 53'; Bliznichenko 67'	Stadium: Suruceni Stadium; Referee: Vyacheslav Banar

28 November 2020 21	Codru Lozova	1–2	Sheriff Tiraspol	Lozova
16:00 EET (UTC+2)	M.Calincov 17'; E.Zaplitnîi (yellow card) 78'	Report	Bliznichenko 24' (pen.); Lukić 90+3' (yellow card) 90+4'	Stadium: Nicolae Simatoc Stadium; Referee: Andrei Kozhocaru

20 February 2021 11	Sheriff Tiraspol	4–1	Sfântul Gheorghe	Tiraspol
14:30 EEST (UTC+3)	Kolovos (yellow card) 9' (goal) 17', 51'; Castañeda 59'; Petro (yellow card) 70'; Traoré 75'	Report	A.Adam (yellow card) 45'; Volkov (yellow card) 58'; Osipov (yellow card) 68'; N.Solodovnicov 81'	Stadium: Malaya Sportivnaya Arena; Referee: Roman Zhitar
Note: Match originally scheduled for 12 September 2020.

24 February 2021 22	Zimbru Chișinău	0–4	Sheriff Tiraspol	Chișinău
14:30 EET (UTC+2)	Pătraș (yellow card) 41'	Report	Bizjak 14'; Kapić 51'; Kolovos 58' (pen.); Castañeda 90+2'	Stadium: Zimbru Stadium; Referee: Daniel Luka
Note: Match originally scheduled for 4 December, but postponed on 28 November 2020

1 March 2021 23	Milsami Orhei	0–1	Sheriff Tiraspol	Orhei
14:30 EET (UTC+2)	Jardan (yellow card) 23'; Bogdan (red card) 90+1'	Report	Arboleda (yellow card) 47'; Castañeda 82'; Marković (yellow card) 90+3'	Stadium: CSR Orhei; Referee: Andrey Cheban
Note: Match originally scheduled for 9 December, but postponed on 28 November 2020

6 March 2021 24	Sheriff Tiraspol	7–0	Dinamo-Auto Tiraspol	Tiraspol
14:30 EET (UTC+2)	Bizjak 16'; Cristiano 38'; Kolovos 41'; Castañeda 48'; Thill 59'; Gadze 63'; Traoré 64'	Report	Litviacov (yellow card) 60'	Stadium: Malaya Sportivnaya Arena; Referee: Gabriel Tupichka
Note: Match originally scheduled for 4 December, but postponed on 28 November 2020

13 March 2021 25	Sheriff Tiraspol	6–0	Florești	Tiraspol
13:00 EET (UTC+2)	Traoré 32', 83'; Thill 45'; Dago 48'; Castañeda 74'; Banda 88'	Report		Stadium: Malaya Sportivnaya Arena; Referee: Igor Boshka

19 March 2021 26	Sheriff Tiraspol	0–0	Petrocub Hîncești	Tiraspol
15:00 EET (UTC+2)	Castañeda (yellow card) 88'	Report	Meira (yellow card) 53'; Sandu (yellow card) 72'	Stadium: Malaya Sportivnaya Arena; Referee: Andrey Cheban

11 April 2021 27	Dacia Buiucani	0–4	Sheriff Tiraspol	Chișinău
16:00 EEST (UTC+3)		Report	Fernando (yellow card) 8'; V.Bîtlan 39' (o.g.); Arboleda (yellow card) 41'; Castañeda 59'; Dago 76'; Traoré 78'; Kyabou (yellow card) 78'; Cristiano (yellow card) 83'; Posmac (yellow card) 86'	Stadium: CSCT Buiucani; Referee: Roman Zhitar

16 April 2021 28	Speranța Nisporeni	0–10	Sheriff Tiraspol	Orhei
13:00 EEST (UTC+3)	Starîș (yellow card) 17'	Report	Bizjak 13', 60', 65'; Castañeda 17' (pen.); Kolovos 29'; Traoré 33'; Dulanto 45+1'; Dago 55', 80'; A.Khatman (yellow card) 62'; Banda 88'	Stadium: CSR Orhei; Referee: Gennadiy Sidenco

24 April 2021 29	Sheriff Tiraspol	2–0	Sfântul Gheorghe	Tiraspol
17:00 EEST (UTC+3)	Traoré 20'; Dulanto (yellow card) 69'; Radeljić (yellow card) 75'; Kapić 90'	Report	Osipov (yellow card) 36'; N.Solodovnicov (yellow card) 40'; Sagna (yellow card) 50'; Lungu	Stadium: Malaya Sportivnaya Arena; Referee: Daniel Luca

29 April 2021 30	Codru Lozova	0–6	Sheriff Tiraspol	Lozova
17:00 EEST (UTC+3)		Report	Banda 19', 24', 43'; Dago 52'; Castañeda 59' (yellow card) 69'; Kolovos 77'	Stadium: Nicolae Simatoc Stadium; Referee: Andrei Kozhokaru

8 May 2021 31	Zimbru Chișinău	0–1	Sheriff Tiraspol	Chișinău
16:00 EEST (UTC+3)	T.Pavalachi (red card) 41'	Report	Traoré (yellow card) 62'; Kapić 68'	Stadium: Zimbru Stadium; Referee: Gabriel Tupichka

12 May 2021 32	Sheriff Tiraspol	6–0	Milsami Orhei	Tiraspol
EEST (UTC+3)	Kolovos 6' (yellow card) 59'; Castañeda 18', 67'; Bizjak 21', 80'; Traoré (yellow card) 29' (goal) 42'; Fernando (yellow card) 43'; Banda (yellow card) 69'	Report	Dedov (yellow card) 45'; Lambarschi (yellow card) 79'; Dragan (yellow card) 88'	Stadium: Malaya Sportivnaya Arena; Referee: Ion Orlik

15 May 2021 33	Dinamo-Auto Tiraspol	0–7	Sheriff Tiraspol	Tîrnauca
16:00 EEST (UTC+3)	Litviacov (yellow card) 27'; Gafina (yellow card) 51'	Report	Dulanto 23'; Castañeda 28' (pen.), 51' (pen.), 90+2'; Traoré 49' (yellow card) 74'; Thill 73', 80'; Arboleda (yellow card) 77'	Stadium: Dinamo-Auto Stadium; Referee: Andrei Cojocaru

19 May 2021 34	Florești	0–3	Sheriff Tiraspol	Bender
16:00 EEST (UTC+3)		Report	Kolovos 73'; Castañeda 76', 89'	Stadium: Dinamo Stadium; Referee: Peter Stoyanov

22 May 2021 35	Petrocub Hîncești	0–1	Sheriff Tiraspol	Hîncești
20:00 EEST (UTC+3)	Efros (yellow card) 70'; Plătică (yellow card) 72'	Report	Kolovos (yellow card) 31'; Bizjak (yellow card) 31' (goal) 75'; Kapić (yellow card) 31'	Stadium: Stadionul Municipal; Referee: Daniel Luka

26 May 2021 36	Sheriff Tiraspol	1–1	Dacia Buiucani	Tiraspol
18:00 EEST (UTC+3)	Bizjak 57'	Report	Cristiano 63' (o.g.); Furtună (yellow card) 74'; D.Calestru (yellow card) 90+2'; Rusnac (yellow card) 90+2'	Stadium: Malaya Sportivnaya Arena; Referee: Gennadiy Sidenco

==== League table ====
Pos	Team	Pld	W	D	L	GF	GA	GD	Pts	Qualification or relegation
1	Sheriff Tiraspol (C)	36	32	3	1	116	7	+109	99	Qualification for the Champions League first qualifying round
2	Petrocub Hîncești	36	25	8	3	82	18	+64	83	Qualification for the Europa Conference League first qualifying round (Note: Sfîntul Gheorghe qualified for the Europa Conference League by winning the 2020–21 Moldovan Cup)
3	Milsami Orhei	36	22	7	7	71	37	+34	73	Qualification for the Europa Conference League first qualifying round
4	Sfîntul Gheorghe	36	21	4	11	65	43	+22	67	Qualification for the Europa Conference League first qualifying round
5	Dacia Buiucani (R)	36	13	9	14	44	45	−1	48 (Note: Dacia Buiucani ahead of Dinamo-Auto on head-to-head points: Dacia Buiucani : 7, Dinamo-Auto : 4.)	Relegation to Division "A" (Note: Dacia Buiucani have been relegated voluntarily due to financial reasons and will be taking part in the second tier league next season.)

Source: FMF, UEFA, Soccerway
Rules for classification: 1) Points; 2) Play-off (only if deciding champion when two teams tied); 3) Head-to-head points; 4) Head-to-head goal difference; 5) Head-to-head away goals scored; 6) Head-to-head goals scored; 7) Matches won; 8) Goal difference; 9) Goals scored; 10) Least red cards; 11) Least yellow cards.
(C) Champions; (R) Relegated

=== Moldovan Cup ===
==== 2019–20 ====
21 June 2020 Semifinal 1st leg	Petrocub-Hîncești	1–0	Sheriff Tiraspol	Hîncești
20:00 EEST (UTC+3)	Țurcan 32' (yellow card) 54'; Bogaciuc (yellow card) 88'; Jardan (yellow card) 90'	Report	Parra (yellow card) 30'	Stadium: Municipal Stadium; Attendance: 0 Referee: Andrei Breguets
Note: Match played behind closed doors due to the COVID-19 pandemic in Moldova. Match was suspended in the 28th minute due to heavy rain, with the game continuing on 22 June 2020 at 20:00 from the 28th minute.

25 June 2020 Semifinal 2nd leg	Sheriff Tiraspol	2–1 (2–2 (a) agg.)	Petrocub-Hîncești	Tiraspol
20:00 EEST (UTC+3)	Parra 34'; Petro (yellow card) 35'; Paireli (yellow card) 43'; Bliznichenko 45+2' (pen.); Obilor (yellow card) 72'; Boban (yellow card) 75'; E.Gliga (yellow card) 90+1'	Report	Melachio (yellow card) 4'; Efros (yellow card) 42'; S.Plătică (yellow card) 55' (goal) 90+3'; Avram (yellow card) 75'	Stadium: Sheriff Stadium; Attendance: 0 Referee: Petru Stoianov
Note: Match played behind closed doors due to the COVID-19 pandemic in Moldova.

==== 2020–21 ====
28 October 2020 Last 16	Sheriff Tiraspol	2–1	Iskra Rîbnița	Tiraspol
15:00 EET (UTC+2)	E.Gliga 37'; Julien (yellow card) 52' (goal) 67'	Report	E.Tuluk 22'; V.Bumbak (yellow card) 84'	Stadium: Sheriff Stadium; Attendance: 0 Referee: Valeriy Minchiune

20 April 2021 Quarterfinal	Sheriff Tiraspol	4–1	Milsami Orhei	Tiraspol
16:00 EET (UTC+2)	Castañeda 15', 63' (pen.), 85' (pen.); Kolovos 25'; Dago (yellow card) 75'; Dulanto (yellow card) 76'	Report	Jardan (yellow card) 62'; M.Antoniuc 71'; Bogdan (yellow card) 82'; Lambarschi (yellow card) 84'	Stadium: Sheriff Stadium; Referee: Gabriel Tupichka

4 May 2021 Semifinal	Sheriff Tiraspol	3–1	Petrocub Hîncești	Tiraspol
17:00 EEST (UTC+3)	Traoré (yellow card) 36' (goal) 81'; Kyabou (yellow card) 38'; Castañeda 65'; Dulanto (yellow card) 76'; Kolovos 90+3'	Report	Potîrniche (yellow card) 11'; M.Plătică 58'; S.Plătică (yellow card) 87'; Onica (yellow card) 87'	Stadium: Sheriff Stadium; Referee: Igor Boshka

===== Final =====
30 May 2021	Sheriff Tiraspol	0–0 (2–3 p)	Sfântul Gheorghe	Chișinău
20:00 EEST (UTC+3)	Bizjak (yellow card) 72'; Castañeda (yellow card) 88'	Report	Crăciun (yellow card) 38'; Ghecev (yellow card) 48'; Lungu (yellow card) 50'; N.Solodovnicov (red card)	Stadium: Zimbru Stadium; Referee: Gabriel Tupichka
	Penalties
	Castañeda (penalty missed); Traoré (penalty missed); Thill (penalty scored); Kolovos (penalty scored); Belousov (penalty missed)		(penalty scored) Slivca; (penalty missed) Taras; (penalty scored) Crăciun; (penalty scored) Suvorov

=== UEFA Champions League ===
==== Qualifying rounds ====
19 August 2020 First qualifying round	Sheriff Tiraspol (Moldova)	2–0	(Luxembourg) Fola Esch	Tiraspol, Moldova
21:00 EEST (UTC+3)	Abang 36'; Parra (yellow card) 66'; Lukić 80'	Report	D.Sinani (yellow card) 56'; Sacras (yellow card) 78'; D.Pimentel (yellow card) 89'	Stadium: Sheriff Stadium; Attendance: 0 Referee: Balázs Berke (Hungary)
Note: Match played behind closed doors due to the COVID-19 pandemic in Europe.

26 August 2020 Second qualifying round	Qarabağ (Azerbaijan)	2–1	(Moldova) Sheriff Tiraspol	Baku, Azerbaijan
19:00 EEST (UTC+3)	Matić 22' (pen.); Emreli 63'; Ibrahimli (yellow card) 73'	Report	Obilor (yellow card) 17'; Abang (red card) 37'; Castañeda 78'	Stadium: Tofiq Bahramov Republican Stadium; Attendance: 0 Referee: Furkat Atazhanov (Kazakhstan)
Note: Match played at the Tofiq Bahramov Republican Stadium, Baku, instead of Qarabağ's regular stadium Azersun Arena, which did not meet UEFA requirements. Match played behind closed doors.

=== UEFA Europa League ===
==== Qualifying rounds ====
24 September 2020 Third qualifying round	Sheriff Tiraspol (Moldova)	1–1 (3–5 p)	(Republic of Ireland) Dundalk	Tiraspol, Moldova
21:00 EEST (UTC+3)	Posmac 8' (yellow card) 38'; Peteleu (yellow card) 61'; N'Diaye (yellow card) 90'; Veloso (yellow card) 100'	Report	Murray 45' (yellow card) 68'; Shields (yellow card) 70'	Stadium: Sheriff Stadium; Referee: Aleksandar Stavrev (North Macedonia)
	Penalties
	Kapić (penalty scored); Obilor (penalty missed); Veloso (penalty scored); Parra (penalty scored)		(penalty scored) Čolović; (penalty scored) Hoban; (penalty scored) Hoare; (penalty scored) McEleney; (penalty scored) Shields
Note: Match played behind closed doors due to the COVID-19 pandemic in Europe.

== Squad statistics ==
As of Match played 30 May 2021

=== Appearances and goals ===
No.	Pos	Nat	Player	Total		Divizia Națională		2019–20 Moldovan Cup		2020–21 Moldovan Cup		Champions League		Europa League	
No.	Pos	Nat	Player	Apps	Goals	Apps	Goals	Apps	Goals	Apps	Goals	Apps	Goals	Apps	Goals
1	GK	(Moldova) MDA	Dumitru Celeadnic	17	0	11	0	2	0	2	0	2	0	0	0
2	DF	(Colombia) COL	Danilo Arboleda	14	0	11+1	0	0	0	0+2	0	0	0	0	0
3	DF	(Malawi) MAW	Charles Petro	28	1	13+9	1	1+1	0	0+1	0	2	0	0+1	0
4	MF	(Moldova) MDA	Adrian Khatman	1	0	0+1	0	0	0	0	0	0	0	0	0
6	DF	(Bosnia and Herzegovina) BIH	Stjepan Radeljić	15	0	10+2	0	0	0	3	0	0	0	0	0
7	MF	(Ukraine) UKR	Andriy Bliznichenko	20	9	9+7	8	1	1	1	0	0+1	0	1	0
8	DF	(Moldova) MDA	Alexandr Belousov	12	0	7+3	0	0	0	1+1	0	0	0	0	0
9	MF	(Mali) MLI	Adama Traoré	18	10	13+2	9	0	0	3	1	0	0	0	0
10	FW	(Colombia) COL	Frank Castañeda	44	33	31+4	28	0+2	0	3+1	4	2	1	1	0
11	FW	(Slovenia) SLO	Lovro Bizjak	19	9	16	9	0	0	3	0	0	0	0	0
13	DF	(Brazil) BRA	Fernando	17	0	10+4	0	0	0	3	0	0	0	0	0
15	DF	(Brazil) BRA	Cristiano	36	1	25+3	1	2	0	2+1	0	2	0	1	0
16	DF	(Trinidad and Tobago) TTO	Keston Julien	18	2	10+6	1	0	0	0+1	1	0+1	0	0	0
17	MF	(Greece) GRE	Dimitris Kolovos	27	12	20+2	10	0	0	3+1	2	0	0	1	0
18	MF	(Mali) MLI	Moussa Kyabou	11	0	7+1	0	0	0	3	0	0	0	0	0
19	MF	(Netherlands) NED	Dabney dos Santos	7	0	0+6	0	0	0	0	0	0	0	0+1	0
23	FW	(Ivory Coast) CIV	Nadrey Dago	17	5	6+8	5	0+1	0	0+2	0	0	0	0	0
24	FW	(Moldova) MDA	Eugeniu Gliga	8	1	1+4	0	0+2	0	1	1	0	0	0	0
26	GK	(Serbia) SRB	Dušan Marković	13	0	11	0	0	0	2	0	0	0	0	0
27	FW	(Malawi) MAW	Peter Banda	16	5	2+12	5	0	0	0+2	0	0	0	0	0
31	MF	(Luxembourg) LUX	Sébastien Thill	17	4	10+4	4	0	0	0+3	0	0	0	0	0
32	DF	(Moldova) MDA	Valeriu Gaiu	19	0	12+5	0	1+1	0	0	0	0	0	0	0
43	FW	(Ghana) GHA	Richard Gadze	19	5	10+8	5	0	0	0	0	0+1	0	0	0
55	DF	(Peru) PER	Gustavo Dulanto	14	2	9+2	2	0	0	3	0	0	0	0	0
88	MF	(Bosnia and Herzegovina) BIH	Rifet Kapić	28	3	16+7	3	0	0	4	0	0	0	0+1	0
90	DF	(Moldova) MDA	Veaceslav Posmac	24	2	15+6	1	2	0	0	0	0	0	1	1
98	MF	(Moldova) MDA	Maxim Cojocaru	4	0	1+2	0	1	0	0	0	0	0	0	0
Players away on loan :
Players who left Sheriff Tiraspol during the season:
6	MF	(Zimbabwe) ZIM	Alec Mudimu	7	1	6	1	0	0	1	0	0	0	0	0
8	MF	(Switzerland) SUI	Max Veloso	8	2	2+4	2	0	0	1	0	0	0	0+1	0
9	FW	(Liberia) LBR	Peter Wilson	20	7	7+10	7	0+2	0	1	0	0	0	0	0
11	DF	(Romania) ROU	Andrei Peteleu	12	0	4+4	0	0	0	1	0	2	0	1	0
14	MF	(Finland) FIN	Sebastian Dahlström	17	1	6+10	1	0	0	0+1	0	0	0	0	0
16	MF	(Moldova) MDA	Vadim Paireli	2	0	0	0	2	0	0	0	0	0	0	0
18	MF	(Colombia) COL	William Parra	23	3	18	2	2	1	0	0	2	0	1	0
20	GK	(Croatia) CRO	Zvonimir Mikulić	15	0	14	0	0	0	0	0	0	0	1	0
44	DF	(Croatia) CRO	Andrej Lukić	20	2	9+6	1	1+1	0	1	0	1+1	1	0	0
55	MF	(Croatia) CRO	Benedik Mioč	17	0	9+3	0	1	0	1	0	2	0	1	0
70	DF	(Nigeria) NGR	Faith Obilor	22	0	15+2	0	1	0	1	0	2	0	1	0
76	FW	(Croatia) CRO	Gabrijel Boban	12	3	7+1	3	2	0	0	0	2	0	0	0
77	FW	(Cameroon) CMR	Anatole Abang	12	6	6+2	5	2	0	0	0	2	1	0	0
91	DF	(Senegal) SEN	Ousmane N'Diaye	13	1	9	1	1	0	0	0	2	0	1	0

=== Goal scorers ===
Place	Position	Nation	Number	Name	Divizia Națională	2019–20 Moldovan Cup	2020–21 Moldovan Cup	Champions League	Europa League	Total
1	FW	(Colombia)	10	Frank Castañeda	28	0	4	1	0	33
2	MF	(Greece)	17	Dimitris Kolovos	10	0	2	0	0	12
3	MF	(Mali)	9	Adama Traoré	9	0	1	0	0	10
4	FW	(Slovenia)	11	Lovro Bizjak	9	0	0	0	0	9
4	MF	(Ukraine)	7	Andriy Bliznichenko	8	1	0	0	0	9
6	FW	(Liberia)	9	Peter Wilson	7	0	0	0	0	7
7	FW	(Cameroon)	77	Anatole Abang	5	0	0	1	0	6
8	FW	(Ghana)	43	Richard Gadze	5	0	0	0	0	5
8	FW	(Ivory Coast)	23	Nadrey Dago	5	0	0	0	0	5
8	FW	(Malawi)	27	Peter Banda	5	0	0	0	0	5
11	MF	(Luxembourg)	31	Sébastien Thill	4	0	0	0	0	4
12	FW	(Croatia)	76	Gabrijel Boban	3	0	0	0	0	3
12	MF	(Bosnia and Herzegovina)	88	Rifet Kapić	3	0	0	0	0	3
12	MF	(Colombia)	18	William Parra	2	1	0	0	0	3
15	MF	(Switzerland)	8	Max Veloso	2	0	0	0	0	2
15	DF	(Peru)	55	Gustavo Dulanto	2	0	0	0	0	2
15	DF	(Trinidad and Tobago)	16	Keston Julien	1	0	1	0	0	2
15	DF	(Moldova)	90	Veaceslav Posmac	1	0	0	0	1	2
15	DF	(Croatia)	44	Andrej Lukić	1	0	0	1	0	2
20	MF	(Zimbabwe)	6	Alec Mudimu	1	0	0	0	0	1
20	DF	(Senegal)	91	Ousmane N'Diaye	1	0	0	0	0	1
20	DF	(Malawi)	3	Charles Petro	1	0	0	0	0	1
20	MF	(Finland)	14	Sebastian Dahlström	1	0	0	0	0	1
20	DF	(Brazil)	15	Cristiano	1	0	0	0	0	1
20	FW	(Moldova)	24	Eugeniu Gliga	0	0	1	0	0	1
20				Own goal	1	0	0	0	0	1
				TOTALS	116	2	9	3	1	131

=== Clean sheets ===
Place	Position	Nation	Number	Name	Divizia Națională	2019–20 Moldovan Cup	2020–21 Moldovan Cup	Champions League	Europa League	Total
1	GK	(Serbia)	26	Dušan Marković	11	0	1	0	0	12
2	GK	(Croatia)	20	Zvonimir Mikulić	10	0	0	0	0	10
3	GK	(Moldova)	1	Dumitru Celeadnic	8	0	0	1	0	9
				TOTALS	28	0	1	1	0	30

=== Disciplinary record ===
Number	Nation	Position	Name	Divizia Națională		2019–20 Cup		2020–21 Cup		Champions League		Europa League		Total	
Number	Nation	Position	Name	Yellow card	Red card	Yellow card	Red card	Yellow card	Red card	Yellow card	Red card	Yellow card	Red card	Yellow card	Red card
2	(Colombia)	DF	Danilo Arboleda	3	0	0	0	0	0	0	0	0	0	3	0
3	(Malawi)	DF	Charles Petro	2	0	1	0	0	0	0	0	0	0	3	0
4	(Moldova)	MF	Adrian Khatman	1	0	0	0	0	0	0	0	0	0	1	0
6	(Bosnia and Herzegovina)	DF	Stjepan Radeljić	1	0	0	0	0	0	0	0	0	0	1	0
7	(Ukraine)	MF	Andriy Bliznichenko	1	0	0	0	0	0	0	0	0	0	1	0
9	(Mali)	MF	Adama Traoré	3	0	0	0	1	0	0	0	0	0	4	0
10	(Colombia)	FW	Frank Castañeda	3	0	0	0	1	0	0	0	0	0	4	0
11	(Slovenia)	FW	Lovro Bizjak	1	0	0	0	1	0	0	0	0	0	2	0
13	(Brazil)	DF	Fernando	2	0	0	0	0	0	0	0	0	0	2	0
15	(Brazil)	DF	Cristiano	2	0	0	0	0	0	0	0	0	0	2	0
16	(Trinidad and Tobago)	DF	Keston Julien	1	0	0	0	1	0	0	0	0	0	2	0
17	(Greece)	MF	Dimitris Kolovos	4	0	0	0	0	0	0	0	0	0	4	0
18	(Mali)	MF	Moussa Kyabou	1	0	0	0	1	0	0	0	0	0	2	0
23	(Ivory Coast)	FW	Nadrey Dago	0	0	0	0	1	0	0	0	0	0	1	0
24	(Moldova)	FW	Eugeniu Gliga	1	0	1	0	0	0	0	0	0	0	2	0
26	(Serbia)	GK	Dušan Marković	1	0	0	0	0	0	0	0	0	0	1	0
27	(Malawi)	FW	Peter Banda	1	0	0	0	0	0	0	0	0	0	1	0
32	(Moldova)	DF	Valeriu Gaiu	2	0	0	0	0	0	0	0	0	0	2	0
55	(Peru)	DF	Gustavo Dulanto	1	0	0	0	2	0	0	0	0	0	3	0
88	(Bosnia and Herzegovina)	MF	Rifet Kapić	1	0	0	0	0	0	0	0	0	0	1	0
90	(Moldova)	DF	Veaceslav Posmac	2	0	0	0	0	0	0	0	1	0	3	0
Players away on loan:
Players who left Sheriff Tiraspol during the season:
6	(Zimbabwe)	MF	Alec Mudimu	3	0	0	0	0	0	0	0	0	0	3	0
8	(Switzerland)	MF	Max Veloso	0	0	0	0	0	0	0	0	1	0	1	0
9	(Liberia)	FW	Peter Wilson	1	0	0	0	0	0	0	0	0	0	1	0
11	(Romania)	DF	Andrei Peteleu	1	0	0	0	0	0	0	0	1	0	2	0
14	(Finland)	MF	Sebastian Dahlström	1	0	0	0	0	0	0	0	0	0	1	0
16	(Moldova)	MF	Vadim Paireli	0	0	1	0	0	0	0	0	0	0	1	0
18	(Colombia)	MF	William Parra	3	0	1	0	0	0	1	0	0	0	5	0
44	(Croatia)	DF	Andrej Lukić	2	0	0	0	0	0	0	0	0	0	2	0
55	(Croatia)	MF	Benedik Mioč	1	0	0	0	0	0	0	0	0	0	1	0
70	(Nigeria)	DF	Faith Obilor	4	0	1	0	0	0	1	0	0	0	6	0
76	(Croatia)	FW	Gabrijel Boban	1	0	1	0	0	0	0	0	0	0	2	0
77	(Cameroon)	FW	Anatole Abang	2	0	0	0	0	0	0	1	0	0	2	1
91	(Senegal)	DF	Ousmane N'Diaye	0	0	0	0	0	0	0	0	1	0	1	0
			TOTALS	54	0	6	0	8	0	2	1	4	0	74	1
