= Dabney dos Santos =

Dutch footballer (born 1996)

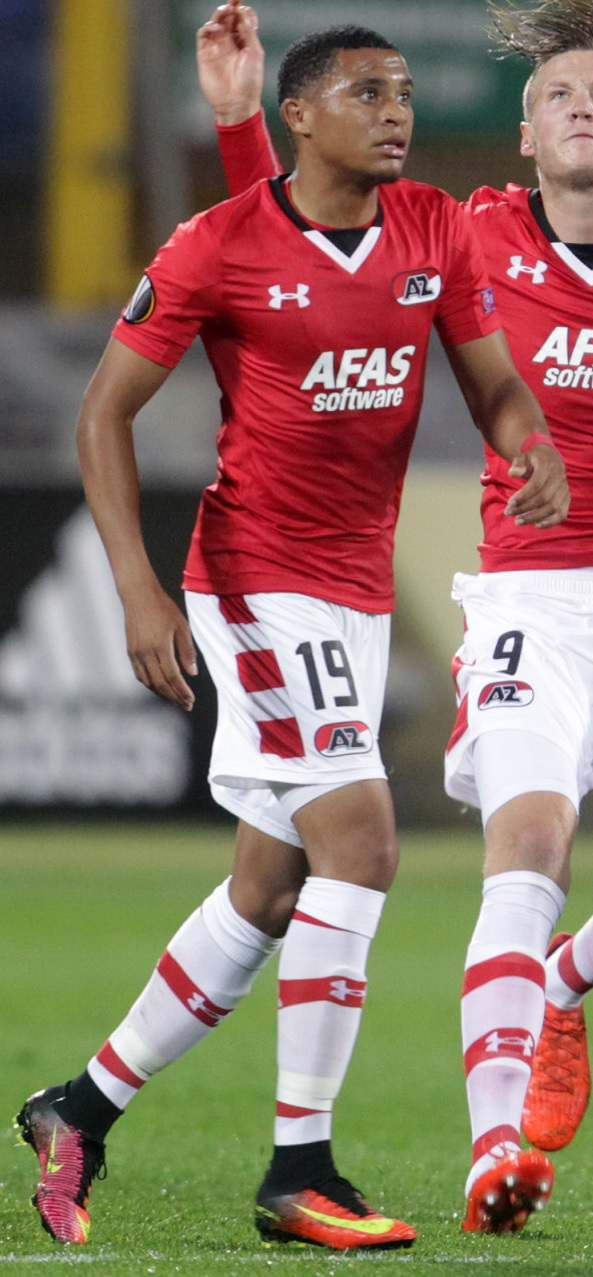
- Dos Santos with AZ in 2016

Personal information
- Full name: Dabney dos Santos Souza
- Date of birth: 31 July 1996 (age 30)
- Place of birth: Amsterdam, Netherlands
- Height: 1.72 m (5 ft 8 in)
- Position: Winger

Youth career
- Abcoude
- –2009: Zeeburgia
- 2009–2014: AZ

Senior career*
Years	Team	Apps	(Gls)
2014–2018	AZ	88	(11)
2016–2018	Jong AZ	7	(1)
2018	→ Sparta Rotterdam (loan)	8	(0)
2018–2020	Heracles Almelo	35	(0)
2020–2021	Sheriff Tiraspol	6	(0)
2023	Trenčín	15	(0)
2025	Câmpulung Muscel	9	(1)

International career
2012–2013	Netherlands U17	9	(2)
2013	Netherlands U18	3	(0)
2014–2015	Netherlands U19	4	(0)
2016	Netherlands U21	2	(0)
- * Club domestic league appearances and goals as of 26 April 2025

Dabney dos Santos Souza (born 31 July 1996) is a Dutch professional footballer who plays as an attacking midfielder.

== Career ==
=== AZ ===
Dos Santos joined AZ in 2009 from Zeeburgia. He made his Eredivisie debut on 25 October 2014 against Groningen replacing Thom Haye after 60 minutes in a 2–2 home draw. On 4 January 2018, he joined Sparta Rotterdam in a loan deal.

=== Heracles Almelo ===
On 30 August 2018, he signed a two-year contract with Heracles Almelo with an additional one-year extension option.

=== Sheriff Tiraspol ===
After his contract expired with Heracles, he joined Moldovan club Sheriff Tiraspol on 4 September 2020. However, a hamstring injury prevented Dos Santos from making an impact, resulting in a challenging season for him. He departed from the club at the conclusion of the title-winning season, having made just seven appearances.

=== Free agency and AS Trenčín ===
In the lead-up to the 2021–22 season, Dos Santos underwent a trial with Go Ahead Eagles. However, this trial did not result in a contract. Subsequently, he had another trial, this time with German club 1. FC Saarbrücken. While he made a positive impression, it became apparent that his playing style did not align with the head coach Uwe Koschinat's tactical vision.

During the 2022–23 season, Dos Santos joined Slovak First Football League club AS Trenčín for a trial as part of their preparations for the second half of the season.

After a successful trial, on 17 February 2023, it was announced that Dos Santos had signed a contract with Trenčín after more than one-and-a-half year as a free agent. This move offered him a chance to rejuvenate his professional career, and just a day later, he made his official debut for the club as a 76th-minute substitute for Artur Gajdoš in a 1–1 league draw against ViOn Zlaté Moravce.

== Personal life ==
Dos Santos is of Cape Verdean descent.

== Career statistics ==
As of match played 26 April 2025

Appearances and goals by club, season and competition
Club	Season	League			National cup (Note: Includes KNVB Cup, Slovak Cup)		Europe		Other		Total	
Club	Season	Division	Apps	Goals	Apps	Goals	Apps	Goals	Apps	Goals	Apps	Goals
AZ	2014–15	Eredivisie	23	2	1	0	—		—		24	2
AZ	2015–16	Eredivisie	30	4	5	0	7 (Note: Appearances in UEFA Europa League)	1	—		42	5
AZ	2016–17	Eredivisie	27	4	4	0	9	1	4 (Note: Appearances in European competition play-offs)	0	44	5
AZ	2017–18	Eredivisie	8	1	1	0	0	0	—		9	1
AZ	Total		88	11	11	0	16	2	4	0	119	13
Sparta Rotterdam (loan)	2017–18	Eredivisie	8	0	—		—		1 (Note: Appearance in relegation play-offs.)	0	9	0
Heracles Almelo	2018–19	Eredivisie	17	0	2	0	—		2	0	21	0
Heracles Almelo	2019–20	Eredivisie	18	0	2	0	—		—		20	0
Heracles Almelo	Total		35	0	4	0	—		2	0	41	0
Sheriff Tiraspol	2020–21	Divizia Națională	6	0	0	0	1	0	—		7	0
Trenčín	2022–23	Slovak First Football League	10	0	3	0	—		—		13	0
Trenčín	2023–24	Slovak First Football League	5	0	0	0	—		—		5	0
Trenčín	Total		15	0	3	0	—		—		18	0
AFC Câmpulung Muscel	2024–25	Liga II	9	1	—		—		—		9	1
Career total			161	12	18	0	17	2	7	0	203	14

== Honours ==
AZ

- KNVB Cup runner-up: 2016–17

Jong AZ

- Tweede Divisie: 2016–17

Sheriff Tiraspol

- Divizia Națională: 2020–21
- Cupa Moldovei runner-up: 2020–21
- Supercupa Moldovei runner-up: 2021
