= 2020–21 Moldovan Cup =

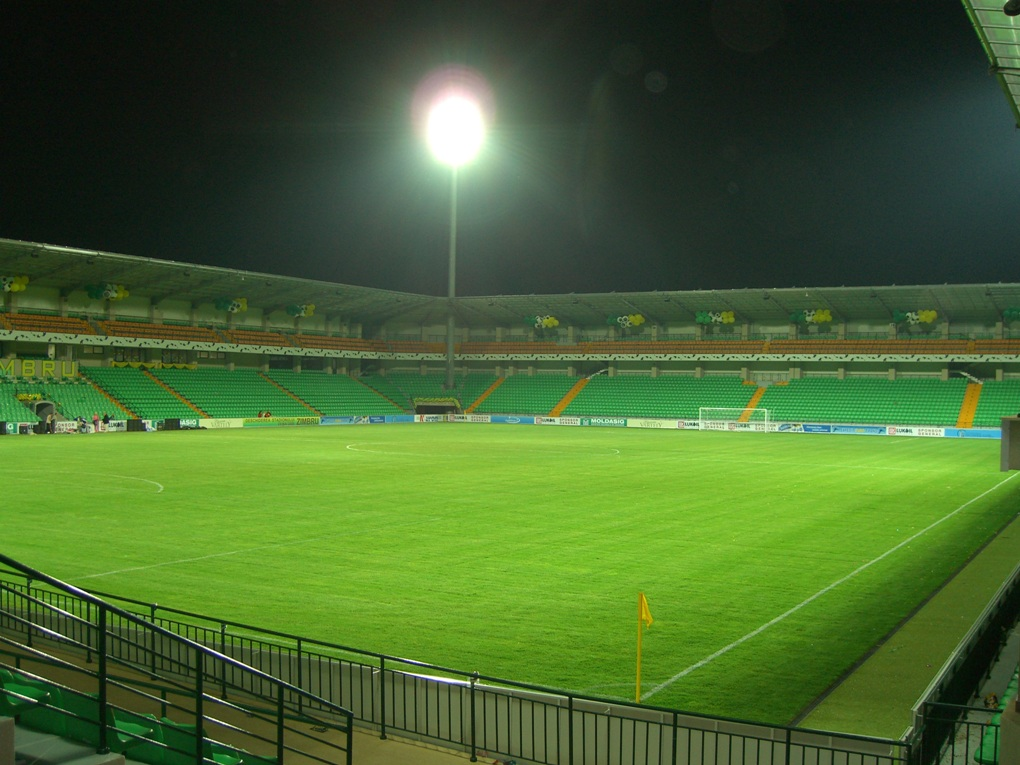
- Zimbru Stadium in Chișinău hosted the final

Tournament details
- Country: Moldova
- Dates: 8 August 2020 – 30 May 2021
- Teams: 47

Final positions
- Champions: Sfîntul Gheorghe
- Runners-up: Sheriff Tiraspol

Tournament statistics
- Matches played: 45
- Goals scored: 188 (4.18 per match)

The 2020–21 Moldovan Cup (Romanian: Cupa Moldovei) was the 30th season of the annual Moldovan football cup competition. The competition started on 8 August 2020 with the preliminary round and concluded with the final on 30 May 2021. The winner qualifies for the first qualifying round of the 2021–22 UEFA Europa Conference League.

== Format and Schedule ==
The preliminary round and the first two rounds proper are regionalised to reduce teams travel costs.

Round	Match dates	Fixtures	Clubs
Preliminary Round	8 August 2020	9	47 → 38
First Round	15–16 August 2020	14	38 → 24
Second Round	28–29 August 2020	8	24 → 16
Round of 16	27–28 October 2020	8	16 → 8
Quarter-Finals	19–20 April 2021	4	8 → 4
Semi-Finals	4 May 2021	2	4 → 2
Final	30 May 2021	1	2 → 1

== Participating clubs ==
The following teams entered the competition:

Divizia Națională the 10 teams of the 2020–21 season	Divizia A the 13 non-reserve teams of the 2020–21 season	Divizia B the 24 teams of the 2020–21 season
Petrocub Hîncești ^{title holder}; Sfîntul Gheorghe ^{runner-up}; Sheriff Tiraspol; Dinamo-Auto; Milsami Orhei; Speranța Nisporeni; Zimbru Chișinău; Codru Lozova; Florești; Dacia Buiucani	Spartanii Selemet; Tighina; Cahul-2005; Victoria Chișinău; Speranța Drochia; Grănicerul Glodeni; Sireți; Bălți; Iskra Rîbnița; Real Succes; Sucleia; Fălești; Olimp Comrat	Sîngerei; Edineț; FCM Ungheni; Sporting Trestieni; Bogzești; Maiak Chirsova; Inter Soroca; Pepeni; Congaz; Cricova; Saksan; Rîșcani; Slobozia Mare; ARF Ialoveni; Cruiz Plus; Văsieni; Sinteza Căușeni; Academia Viitorul; Codru-Juniori; Olimpia Bălți; Cimișlia; Mănoilești; Socol Copceac; Visoca

== Preliminary round ==
18 clubs from the Divizia B entered this round. Teams that finished higher on the league in the previous season played their ties away. 6 clubs from the Divizia B received a bye for the preliminary round. Matches were played on 8 August 2020.

Saksan (3)	w/o	Congaz (3)

8 August 2020	Mănoilești (3)	3–2	Olimpia Bălți (3)	Ungheni
17:30 EEST	I. Ghiderman 36'; C. Iacovici 55'; D. Petraș 58'		D. Cobîlaș 44'; A. Vasilat 77'	Stadium: Ungheni Stadium; Referee: Vladimir Mortean

8 August 2020	Visoca (3)	1–0	Cruiz Plus (3)	Soroca
17:30 EEST	D. Patic 70'			Stadium: Soroca Stadium; Referee: Nicolai Bălțătescu

8 August 2020	Rîșcani (3)	0–1	Inter Soroca (3)	Rîșcani
17:30 EEST			V. Botnaru 36'	Stadium: Rîșcani Stadium; Referee: Veaceslav Morgun

8 August 2020	Codru-Juniori (3)	4–4 (a.e.t.) (5–6 p)	Pepeni (3)	Călărași
17:30 EEST	C. Păvălache 47', 62'; V. Rău 81'; D. Orbu 117'		D. Gurușciuc 29'; S. Lopotenco 55', 77'; V. Maxian 108'	Stadium: Călărași Stadium; Referee: Pavel Mura

8 August 2020	Socol Copceac (3)	3–1	Slobozia Mare (3)	Copceac
17:30 EEST	V. Mavrodi 12'; V. Erizan 25'; V. Sacalî 90+1'		V. Mocanu 20'	Stadium: Copceac Stadium; Referee: Vitalie Cobzac

8 August 2020	Cimișlia (3)	3–1	Sinteza Căușeni (3)	Cimișlia
17:30 EEST	M. Putină 44'; A. Dojencov 85'; A. Iacubițchi 90+1'		I. Morari 90+4'	Stadium: Cimișlia Stadium; Referee: Vladislav Stoianov

8 August 2020	Academia Viitorul (3)	1–9	ARF Ialoveni (3)	Chișinău
17:30 EEST	R. Pegza 5'		F. Trofim 17' (pen.), 28', 32'; A. Bîrcă 21', 23'; A. Rotaru 23'; A. Lungu 77'; R. Andrușceac 80'; V. Țurcanu 87'	Stadium: CS Real Succes Stadium; Referee: Eugen Scorolitnîi

8 August 2020	Văsieni (3)	3–0	Cricova (3)	Văsieni
17:30 EEST	G. Mihăilă 39'; S. Rusu 48' (pen.); I. Mahu 84'			Stadium: Văsieni Stadium; Referee: Valeriu Minciună

== First round ==
15 clubs from the Divizia B and 13 clubs from the Divizia A entered this round. In a match, the home advantage was granted to the team from the lower league. If two teams are from the same division, the team that finished higher on the league in the previous season played their tie away. Matches were played on 15 and 16 August 2020.

15 August 2020	Edineț (3)	0–1	Bălți (2)	Edineț
17:30 EEST			Gómez 45'	Stadium: Edineț Stadium; Referee: Nicolae Murzac

15 August 2020	Sîngerei (3)	2–0	Grănicerul Glodeni (2)	Sîngerei
17:30 EEST	A. Rusu 20', 85'			Stadium: Sîngerei Stadium; Referee: Veaceslav Morgun

15 August 2020	FCM Ungheni (3)	5–0	Speranța Drochia (2)	Ungheni
17:30 EEST	N. Porojniuc 1', 25'; F. Cojocaru 83'; D. Barbacaru 88'; A. Miron 90'			Stadium: Ungheni Stadium; Referee: Alexandru Tean

15 August 2020	Inter Soroca (3)	2–3	Fălești (2)	Soroca
17:30 EEST	V. Boldescu 6' (pen.); G. Cojocaru 22'		Boghiu 44'; G. Jurat 45+2', 47'	Stadium: Soroca Stadium; Referee: Vladimir Mortean

15 August 2020	Pepeni (3)	0–7	Victoria Chișinău (2)	Pepeni
17:30 EEST			Orbu 28', 42'; D. Bordianu 31'; Tiron 38'; F. Cheltuitor 39'; I. Iancioglo 76', 89'	Stadium: Pepeni Stadium; Referee: Ivan Tudos

15 August 2020	Socol Copceac (3)	2–1	Olimp Comrat (2)	Copceac
17:30 EEST	V. Sacalî 17', 44'		E. Borovschi 75'	Stadium: Copceac Stadium; Referee: Vasile Berladean

15 August 2020	Cimișlia (3)	1–5	Spartanii Selemet (2)	Cimișlia
17:30 EEST	A. Pascal 64'		V. Rassulov 25', 76'; Onofrei 42', 45', 69'	Stadium: Cimișlia Stadium; Referee: Oleg Stoianov

15 August 2020	ARF Ialoveni (3)	2–0	Real Succes (2)	Nimoreni
17:30 EEST	M. Bolocan 13'; V. Graur 52'			Stadium: Noroc Stadium; Referee: Grigore Ciugui

15 August 2020	Văsieni (3)	0–5	Cahul-2005 (2)	Văsieni
17:30 EEST			I. Stancev 34'; Nudnîi 40' (pen.); D. Zagorodnîi 54', 81'; Pașcenco 90+1'	Stadium: Văsieni Stadium; Referee: Grigore Vorfolomei

15 August 2020	Saksan (3)	3–4 (a.e.t.)	Sucleia (2)	Ceadîr-Lunga
17:30 EEST	A. Diordiev 67'; Gorodețchi 38', 44'		F. Conteh 73', 90+2'; C. Godday 55', 115'	Stadium: Ceadîr-Lunga Stadium; Referee: Iurie Levința

15 August 2020	Bogzești (3)	1–2 (a.e.t.)	Sporting Trestieni (3)	Telenești
17:30 EEST	C. Cebotari 59'		T. Boțanu 60'; V. Zalenschi 99'	Stadium: Telenești Stadium; Referee: Radu Tobultoc

15 August 2020	Maiak Chirsova (3)	1–2	Tighina (2)	Chirsova
17:30 EEST	M. Crudu 19'		A. Stasev 49' (pen.); Tcaciuc 58'	Stadium: Chirsova Stadium; Referee: Gheorghe Dandeș

16 August 2020	Mănoilești (3)	1–4	Sireți (2)	Ungheni
17:30 EEST	D. Petraș 17'		V. Gologan 51'; A. Erhan 55'; O. Șoimu 87' (pen.), 90+2' (pen.)	Stadium: Ungheni Stadium; Referee: Cătălin Pidghirnîi

16 August 2020	Visoca (3)	1–3	Iskra Rîbnița (2)	Soroca
17:30 EEST	D. Patic 39'		I. Mirciu 19'; V. Reznic 26'; I. Bîcicov 83'	Stadium: Soroca Stadium; Referee: Andrei Cuziac

== Second round ==
The 14 winners from the previous round joined the 2 Divizia Națională sides seeded 9-10, Florești and Dacia Buiucani. In a match, the home advantage was granted to the team from the lower league. If two teams are from the same division, the team that finished higher on the league in the previous season played their tie away. The pairs for 2 Divizia Națională sides were determined in a draw held on 18 August 2020. Matches were played on 28 and 29 August 2020.

28 August 2020	Bălți (2)	0–2	Florești (1)	Bălți
16:30 EEST		Report	A. Calac 33'; D. Semirov 88'	Stadium: Bălți Stadium; Referee: Gabriel Tupicica

28 August 2020	Iskra Rîbnița (2)	4–0	Sireți (2)	Rîbnița
16:30 EEST	E. Tuluc 21'; Gafina 35' (pen.); N. Roizman 67'; I. Pîslari 71'	Report		Stadium: Rîbnița Stadium; Referee: Andrei Diordiev

28 August 2020	Tighina (2)	0–4	Dacia Buiucani (1)	Bender
16:30 EEST		Report	M. Căruntu 24'; Nemerenco 39'; N. Namolovan 52'; Crîcimari 62'	Stadium: Bender Stadium; Referee: Alexandru Tean

29 August 2020	FCM Ungheni (3)	3–2	Sîngerei (3)	Ungheni
16:30 EEST	N. Porojniuc 13', 18', 76'	Report	D. Maga 21'; Grab 60' (pen.)	Stadium: Ungheni Stadium; Referee: Daniel Luca

29 August 2020	Fălești (2)	1–5	Victoria Chișinău (2)	Bălți
16:30 EEST	D. Bîzga 22'	Report	Orbu 32' (pen.), 56'; I. Iancioglo 36', 45+2'; R. Jalbă 76'	Stadium: Pișcevik Stadium; Referee: Vasile Berladean

29 August 2020	Socol Copceac (3)	2–0	Spartanii Selemet (2)	Copceac
16:30 EEST	V. Sacalî 67'; S. Calmîș 90+1'	Report		Stadium: Copceac Stadium; Referee: Roman Jitari

29 August 2020	ARF Ialoveni (3)	0–5	Cahul-2005 (2)	Nimoreni
16:30 EEST		Report	V. Mîță 10'; V. Haritov 43'; Nudnîi 50'; S. Dobrioglo 62'; D. Zagorodnîi 65'	Stadium: Noroc Stadium; Referee: Valeriu Minciună

29 August 2020	Sporting Trestieni (3)	3–1	Sucleia (2)	Chișinău
16:30 EEST	A. Apostol 22', 51' (pen.); V. Gonța 48'	Report	C. Godday 62'	Stadium: Zimbru-3 Stadium; Referee: Andrei Ceban

== Final stage ==
=== Bracket ===
Round of 16
Sheriff Tiraspol	2
Iskra Rîbnița	1
Milsami Orhei	7
Victoria Chișinău	1
Zimbru Chișinău	0
Florești	1
Petrocub Hîncești	4
FCM Ungheni	1
Dinamo-Auto	13
Socol Copceac	0
Codru Lozova	1
Cahul-2005	0
Sporting Trestieni	0
Sfîntul Gheorghe	4
Speranța Nisporeni (a.e.t.)	2
Dacia Buiucani	1

Quarter-finals
Sheriff Tiraspol	4
Milsami Orhei	1
Florești	1
Petrocub Hîncești (a.e.t.)	2
Dinamo-Auto (a.e.t.)	2
Codru Lozova	1
Sfîntul Gheorghe (a.e.t.)	5
Speranța Nisporeni	1

Semi-finals
Sheriff Tiraspol	3
Petrocub Hîncești	1
Dinamo-Auto	1
Sfîntul Gheorghe (a.e.t.)	2

Final
Sheriff Tiraspol	0 (2)
Sfîntul Gheorghe (a.e.t.) (p)	0 (3)

== Round of 16 ==
The 8 winners from the previous round joined the remaining 8 Divizia Națională sides seeded 1-8. The home teams and the pairs were determined in a draw held on 4 September 2020. Matches were played on 27 and 28 October 2020.

27 October 2020	Milsami Orhei (1)	7–1	Victoria Chișinău (2)	Orhei
13:00 EET	V. Jardan 11', 61'; Dragan 15'; Puntus 49', 63', 86', 90'	Report	I. Pavlov 8'	Stadium: CSR Orhei; Attendance: 200; Referee: Ion Bilea

27 October 2020	Codru Lozova (1)	1–0	Cahul-2005 (2)	Lozova
18:00 EET	N. Vdovichenko 57'	Report		Stadium: Nicolae Simatoc; Attendance: 300; Referee: Roman Jitari

28 October 2020	Zimbru Chișinău (1)	0–1	Florești (1)	Chișinău
13:00 EET		Report	Maneacov 74' (pen.)	Stadium: Zimbru-2; Referee: Dumitru Muntean

28 October 2020	Petrocub Hîncești (1)	4–1	FCM Ungheni (3)	Sărata-Galbenă
13:00 EET	S. Plătică 12', 27', 65'; Țurcan 74'	Report	O. Vatavu 37'	Stadium: Sărata-Galbenă Stadium; Attendance: 100; Referee: Alexandru Stefciuc

28 October 2020	Dinamo-Auto (1)	13–0	Socol Copceac (3)	Tîrnauca
13:00 EET	Mihaliov 4' (pen.); Paireli 5', 44'; Samiev 8'; I. Chiperi 34'; Y. Kondratiuk 42'; Fedorov 50', 51'; A. Todorov 59' (o.g.); Pușcaș 75'; V. Smîntînă 86'; Dijinari 90'; D. Rogac 90+1'	Report		Stadium: Dinamo-Auto; Referee: Nicolae Murzac

28 October 2020	Sporting Trestieni (3)	0–4	Sfîntul Gheorghe (1)	Suruceni
13:00 EET		Report	Suvorov 7'; Ghecev 12', 69'; Plămădeală 90+2'	Stadium: Suruceni Stadium; Attendance: 50; Referee: Andrei Ceban

28 October 2020	Speranța Nisporeni (1)	2–1 (a.e.t.)	Dacia Buiucani (1)	Orhei
13:00 EET	Guyganov 40'; Pîslă 115'	Report	Nemerenco 35'	Stadium: CSR Orhei; Attendance: 50; Referee: Petru Stoianov

28 October 2020	Sheriff Tiraspol (1)	2–1	Iskra Rîbnița (2)	Tiraspol
15:00 EET	E. Gliga 36'; Julien 67'	Report	E. Tuluc 22'	Stadium: Sheriff small Arena; Referee: Valeriu Minciună

== Quarter-finals ==
The 8 winners from the previous round entered the quarter-finals. The home teams were determined in a draw held on 3 November 2020. Matches were played on 19 and 20 April 2021.

19 April 2021	Florești (1)	1–2 (a.e.t.)	Petrocub Hîncești (1)	Bender
13:00 EEST	Rebenja 4'	Report	M. Plătică 67'; Gulceac 103'	Stadium: Bender Stadium; Referee: Petru Stoianov

19 April 2021	Dinamo-Auto (1)	2–1 (a.e.t.)	Codru Lozova (1)	Tîrnauca
13:00 EEST	Samiev 50'; Y. Kondratyuk 120'	Report	M. Ihekuna 78'	Stadium: Dinamo-Auto; Referee: Andrei Ceban

20 April 2021	Sfîntul Gheorghe (1)	5–1 (a.e.t.)	Speranța Nisporeni (1)	Chișinău
13:00 EEST	Crăciun 30'; Volkov 93'; M. Focșa 100'; Suvorov 105' (pen.), 119'	Report	Voronchenko 34'	Stadium: Zimbru-3 Stadium; Referee: Dumitru Muntean

20 April 2021	Sheriff Tiraspol (1)	4–1	Milsami Orhei (1)	Tiraspol
16:00 EEST	Castañeda 15', 63' (pen.), 85' (pen.); Kolovos 25'	Report	M. Antoniuc 71'	Stadium: Sheriff small Arena; Referee: Gabriel Tupicica

== Semi-finals ==
The 4 winners from the previous round entered the semi-finals. The home teams were determined in a draw held on 22 April 2021. Matches were played on 4 May 2021.

4 May 2021	Dinamo-Auto (1)	1–2 (a.e.t.)	Sfîntul Gheorghe (1)	Tîrnauca
15:00 EEST	A. Genaev 68'	Report	N. Solodovnicov 65'; Stînă 114'	Stadium: Dinamo-Auto; Referee: Petru Stoianov

4 May 2021	Sheriff Tiraspol (1)	3–1	Petrocub Hîncești (1)	Tiraspol
17:00 EEST	Castañeda 64'; Traoré 81'; Kolovos 90+3'	Report	M. Plătică 56'	Stadium: Sheriff small Arena; Referee: Igor Boșca

== Final ==
The final was played on Sunday 30 May 2021 at the Zimbru Stadium in Chișinău. The "home" team (for administrative purposes) was determined by an additional draw held on 6 May 2021.

30 May 2021
20:00 EEST

Sheriff Tiraspol	0–0 (a.e.t.)	Sfîntul Gheorghe
	Report
Penalties
Castañeda (penalty missed); Traoré (penalty missed); Thill (penalty scored); Kolovos (penalty scored); Belousov (penalty missed)	2–3	(penalty scored) Slivca; (penalty missed) Taras; (penalty scored) Crăciun; (penalty scored) Suvorov

Zimbru Stadium, Chișinău
Attendance: 2,737
Referee: Gabriel Tupicica (Moldova)

Sheriff	Sf. Gheorghe

GK	26	(Serbia) Dušan Marković
DF	6	(Bosnia and Herzegovina) Stjepan Radeljić
DF	13	(Brazil) Fernando Peixoto		(substituted off) 120+1'
DF	15	(Brazil) Cristiano da Silva
DF	55	(Peru) Gustavo Dulanto
MF	17	(Greece) Dimitris Kolovos
MF	18	(Mali) Moussa Kyabou
MF	88	(Bosnia and Herzegovina) Rifet Kapić		(substituted off) 91'
FW	9	(Mali) Adama Traoré
FW	10	(Colombia) Frank Castañeda (c)	(yellow card) 89'
FW	11	(Slovenia) Lovro Bizjak	(yellow card) 73'	(substituted off) 77'
Substitutes:
GK	1	(Moldova) Dumitru Celeadnic
GK	33	(Moldova) Serghei Pașcenco
DF	2	(Colombia) Danilo Arboleda
DF	3	(Malawi) Charles Petro
DF	8	(Moldova) Alexandr Belousov		(substituted on) 120+1'
DF	16	(Trinidad and Tobago) Keston Julien
DF	90	(Moldova) Veaceslav Posmac
MF	31	(Luxembourg) Sébastien Thill		(substituted on) 91'
MF	98	(Moldova) Maxim Cojocaru
FW	23	(Ivory Coast) Nadrey Dago		(substituted on) 77'
FW	27	(Malawi) Peter Banda
Head Coach:
(Ukraine) Yuriy Vernydub

GK	25	(Moldova) Nicolae Calancea
DF	17	(Moldova) Petru Ojog
DF	18	(Moldova) Mihail Ștefan
DF	19	(Moldova) Serghei Svinarenco		(substituted off) 120'
DF	24	(Senegal) Sidy Sagna
DF	97	(Moldova) Artur Crăciun	(yellow card) 38'
MF	5	(Moldova) Vitalie Plămădeală (c)		(substituted off) 65'
MF	13	(Moldova) Teodor Lungu	(yellow card) 51'	(substituted off) 100'
MF	98	(Moldova) Victor Stînă		(substituted off) 106'
FW	11	(Moldova) Mihail Ghecev	(yellow card) 48'	(substituted off) 114'
FW	88	(Moldova) Nicolai Solodovnicov		(substituted off) 65'
Substitutes:
GK	1	(Moldova) Maxim Railean
DF	3	(Moldova) Maxim Focșa
DF	4	(Moldova) Andrei Novicov
DF	16	(Moldova) Ion Borș
MF	7	(Moldova) Alexandru Suvorov		(substituted on) 106'
MF	8	(Moldova) Alexandru Osipov		(substituted on) 114'
MF	14	(Nigeria) Aliyu Adam		(substituted on) 65'
MF	21	(Moldova) Eugen Slivca		(substituted on) 100'
MF	22	(Moldova) Dan Taras		(substituted on) 120'
MF	99	(Moldova) Artiom Carastoian
FW	9	(Belarus) Roman Volkov		(substituted on) 65'
Head Coach:
(Moldova) Serghei Cebotari

Assistant referees:
Andrei Bodean (Moldova)
Victor Mardari (Moldova)
Additional assistant referees:
Victor Bugenko (Moldova)
Andrei Cojocaru (Moldova)
Fourth official:
Denis Borisov (Moldova)

Match rules

- 90 minutes.
- 30 minutes of extra time if necessary.
- Penalty shoot-out if score is still level.
- Eleven named substitutes.
- Maximum of five substitutions, with a sixth allowed in extra time.
