= 2020–21 Moldovan National Division =

Divizia Națională
- Season: 2020–21
- Dates: 3 July 2020 – 26 May 2021
- Champions: Sheriff; 19th title
- Relegated: Dacia Buiucani
- Champions League: Sheriff
- Conference League: Sfîntul Gheorghe; Petrocub; Milsami
- Matches: 180
- Goals: 562 (3.12 per match)
- Top goalscorer: Frank Castañeda (28 goals)
- Best goalkeeper: Cristian Avram (15 clean sheets)
- Biggest home win: Petrocub 7–0 Codru (17 July 2020); Dinamo-Auto 7–0 Codru (11 September 2020); Sheriff 7–0 Dinamo-Auto (6 March 2021)
- Biggest away win: Speranța 0–10 Sheriff (16 April 2021)
- Highest scoring: Codru 1–9 Petrocub (23 February 2021); Speranța 0–10 Sheriff (16 April 2021)
- Longest winning run: 15 matches Sheriff
- Longest unbeaten run: 24 matches Petrocub
- Longest winless run: 19 matches Codru
- Longest losing run: 14 matches Codru

The 2020–21 Moldovan National Division (Romanian: Divizia Națională) was the 30th season of top-tier football in Moldova. The season started on 3 July 2020 and ended on 26 May 2021. Sheriff Tiraspol were the defending champions. The winners of the league this season earned a spot in the first qualifying round of the 2021–22 UEFA Champions League, and the second, third and fourth placed clubs earned a place in the first qualifying round of the 2021–22 UEFA Europa Conference League.

== Teams ==
A total of 10 teams competing in the league. These include 8 teams from the 2019 season and two promoted teams from the "A" Division: Florești and Dacia Buiucani, both making their debut in the top flight.

Team	Place	Ground	Capacity	Coach
Codru	Lozova	Nicolae Simatoc Stadium	1,100	(Moldova) Alexei Savinov
Dacia Buiucani	Chișinău	Zimbru-2 Stadium	2,000	(Moldova) Andrei Martin
Dinamo-Auto	Tiraspol	Dinamo-Auto Stadium	1,300	(Russia) Igor Dobrovolski
Florești	Florești	Bender Stadium	5,000	(Moldova) Iurie Groșev
Milsami	Orhei	CSR Orhei	3,000	(Moldova) Serghei Dubrovin
Petrocub	Hîncești	Hîncești Stadium	1,200	(Moldova) Lilian Popescu
Sfîntul Gheorghe	Suruceni	Suruceni Stadium	1,500	(Moldova) Serghei Cebotari
Sheriff	Tiraspol	Sheriff Stadium	12,726	(Ukraine) Yuriy Vernydub
Speranța	Nisporeni	CSR Orhei	3,000	(Moldova) Iurie Osipenco
Zimbru	Chișinău	Zimbru Stadium	10,400	(Moldova) Vlad Goian

=== Managerial changes ===
Team	Outgoing manager	Manner of departure	Date of vacancy	Position in table	Replaced by	Date of appointment
Zimbru	(Moldova) Veaceslav Sofroni	End of caretaker spell	11 December 2019	Pre-season	(Italy) Sandro Pochesci	11 December 2019
Codru	(Moldova) Valeriu Andronic	Signed by Moldova U15/U16	24 December 2019	Pre-season	(Moldova) Simeon Bulgaru	23 January 2020
Milsami	(Moldova) Veaceslav Rusnac	Signed by Kyzylzhar	9 January 2020	Pre-season	(Moldova) Serghei Dubrovin	11 March 2020
Speranța	(Moldova) Cristian Efros	Resigned	1 February 2020	Pre-season	(Moldova) Iurie Osipenco	4 February 2020
Florești	(Moldova) Oleg Șișchin	Demoted to assistant coach	6 February 2020	Pre-season	(Moldova) Iurie Groșev	6 February 2020
Zimbru	(Italy) Sandro Pochesci	Resigned	7 February 2020	Pre-season	(Italy) Giovanni Scanu	7 February 2020
Zimbru	(Italy) Giovanni Scanu	Released	4 March 2020	Pre-season	(Moldova) Vlad Goian	10 June 2020
Codru	(Moldova) Simeon Bulgaru	Resigned	2 June 2020	Pre-season	(Moldova) Sergiu Chirilov	4 July 2020
Zimbru	(Moldova) Vlad Goian	Promoted to academy technical director	16 October 2020	9th	(Moldova) Simeon Bulgaru (interim)	16 October 2020
Sheriff	(Croatia) Zoran Zekić	Resigned	21 October 2020	1st	(Moldova) Victor Mihailov (interim)	21 October 2020
Sheriff	(Moldova) Victor Mihailov	End of caretaker spell	14 January 2021	1st	(Ukraine) Yuriy Vernydub	14 January 2021
Zimbru	(Moldova) Simeon Bulgaru	Resigned	17 January 2021	9th	(Moldova) Vlad Goian	18 January 2021
Codru	(Moldova) Sergiu Chirilov	Released	18 January 2021	10th	(Moldova) Alexei Savinov	18 January 2021
Speranța	(Moldova) Iurie Osipenco	Released	24 February 2021	7th	(Ukraine) Volodymyr Prokopynenko	24 February 2021

== League table ==
Pos	Team	Pld	W	D	L	GF	GA	GD	Pts	Qualification or relegation
1	Sheriff Tiraspol (C)	36	32	3	1	116	7	+109	99	Qualification for the Champions League first qualifying round
2	Petrocub Hîncești	36	25	8	3	82	18	+64	83	Qualification for the Europa Conference League first qualifying round (Note: Sfîntul Gheorghe qualified for the Europa Conference League by winning the 2020–21 Moldovan Cup)
3	Milsami Orhei	36	22	7	7	71	37	+34	73	Qualification for the Europa Conference League first qualifying round
4	Sfîntul Gheorghe	36	21	4	11	65	43	+22	67	Qualification for the Europa Conference League first qualifying round
5	Dacia Buiucani (R)	36	13	9	14	44	45	−1	48 (Note: Dacia Buiucani ahead of Dinamo-Auto on head-to-head points: Dacia Buiucani : 7, Dinamo-Auto : 4.)	Relegation to Division "A" (Note: Dacia Buiucani have been relegated voluntarily due to financial reasons and will be taking part in the second tier league next season.)
6	Dinamo-Auto	36	12	12	12	53	58	−5	48	
7	Florești	36	9	5	22	37	85	−48	32	
8	Zimbru Chișinău	36	6	7	23	39	63	−24	25	
9	Speranța Nisporeni	36	5	8	23	29	87	−58	23	Expelled (Note: Speranța Nisporeni failed to arrive for their 33rd and 34th Round games and subsequently were expelled from the competition. All remaining fixtures are awarded 0–3 against them.)
10	Codru Lozova	36	2	3	31	26	119	−93	9	Withdrew (Note: As per regulations, the tenth placed team Codru Lozova was to be relegated to Divizia A, but the club withdrew before the start of the next season.)

Source: FMF, UEFA, Soccerway
Rules for classification: 1) Points; 2) Play-off (only if deciding champion when two teams tied); 3) Head-to-head points; 4) Head-to-head goal difference; 5) Head-to-head away goals scored; 6) Head-to-head goals scored; 7) Matches won; 8) Goal difference; 9) Goals scored; 10) Least red cards; 11) Least yellow cards.
(C) Champions; (R) Relegated

== Results ==
Teams will play each other four times (twice at home, twice away).

=== Rounds 1−18 ===
Matches 1−18
Home \ Away	COD	DAC	DIN	FLO	MIL	PET	SFÎ	SHE	SPE	ZIM
Codru Lozova	—	0–1	1–4	1–1	1–4	1–4	0–0	1–2	0–1	0–2
Dacia Buiucani	4–0	—	4–0	2–0	0–0	0–0	0–4	0–3	0–3	2–1
Dinamo-Auto	7–0	1–0	—	3–1	1–1	1–1	0–1	1–2	3–3	1–1
Florești	1–0	1–0	0–5	—	0–4	0–4	1–4	0–1	1–1	1–0
Milsami Orhei	3–1	2–0	1–0	3–0	—	0–0	1–1	0–1	3–0	2–0
Petrocub Hîncești	7–0	2–0	3–1	4–0	1–2	—	1–0	1–0	2–0	2–0
Sfîntul Gheorghe	5–1	2–1	1–1	2–0	3–1	0–4	—	0–1	1–0	2–0
Sheriff Tiraspol	6–0	0–0	6–0	5–0	1–0	4–1	4–1	—	2–0	2–0
Speranța Nisporeni	3–0	0–0	1–2	0–0	0–1	1–4	0–2	1–2	—	2–2
Zimbru Chișinău	3–1	0–1	0–0	0–2	0–1	0–1	1–3	0–4	0–2	—

Source: FMF, Soccerway
Legend: Blue = home team win; Yellow = draw; Red = away team win.

=== Rounds 19−36 ===
Matches 19−36
Home \ Away	COD	DAC	DIN	FLO	MIL	PET	SFÎ	SHE	SPE	ZIM
Codru Lozova	—	0–4	0–2	2–1	2–4	1–9	1–2	0–6	1–2	1–5
Dacia Buiucani	5–1	—	2–1	2–2	0–0	1–2	1–0	0–4	4–1	1–1
Dinamo-Auto	1–0	1–1	—	2–1	2–0	0–0	0–2	0–7	0–0	3–0
Florești	2–1	2–0	4–1	—	2–5	0–1	0–4	0–3	4–4	3–1
Milsami Orhei	7–2	3–0	2–2	3–2	—	1–3	2–1	0–1	3–0	2–1
Petrocub Hîncești	1–0	4–1	1–1	4–0	1–1	—	2–0	0–1	3–0 (Note: Technical wins/losses)	3–0
Sfîntul Gheorghe	2–2	2–0	3–1	3–2	1–3	0–3	—	0–2	3–0	4–3
Sheriff Tiraspol	6–0	1–1	7–0	6–0	6–0	0–0	2–0	—	3–0	4–0
Speranța Nisporeni	0–3	0–3	0–4	1–3	0–4	1–3	0–3	0–10	—	2–2
Zimbru Chișinău	2–1	1–3	1–1	3–0	1–2	0–0	2–3	0–1	6–0	—

Source: FMF, Soccerway
Legend: Blue = home team win; Yellow = draw; Red = away team win.

== Positions by round ==
Team ╲ Round	1	2	3	4	5	6	7	8	9	10	11	12	13	14	15	16	17	18	19	20	21	22	23	24	25	26	27	28	29	30	31	32	33	34	35	36
Codru Lozova	10	10	10	10	10	10	10	10	10	10	10	10	10	10	10	10	10	10	10	10	10	10	10	10	10	10	10	10	10	10	10	10	10	10	10	10
Dacia Buiucani	4	3	6	5	5	4	6	6	6	6	6	6	6	6	5	5	5	6	6	6	6	6	6	6	6	6	6	6	6	6	6	6	5	5	5	5
Dinamo-Auto	2	4	4	4	4	5	5	5	5	5	5	5	5	5	6	6	6	5	5	5	5	5	5	5	5	5	5	5	5	5	5	5	6	6	6	6
Florești	8	6	7	7	8	8	9	8	8	8	8	8	8	8	8	8	8	8	8	8	8	8	8	8	8	8	8	7	7	7	7	7	7	7	7	7
Milsami Orhei	5	7	5	6	6	6	4	4	4	4	2	2	3	4	4	3	3	3	4	3	3	3	3	3	3	3	3	3	3	3	3	3	3	3	3	3
Petrocub Hîncești	6	2	2	2	2	2	2	2	2	2	3	3	2	2	2	2	2	2	2	2	2	2	2	2	2	2	2	2	2	2	2	2	2	2	2	2
Sfîntul Gheorghe	1	5	3	3	3	3	3	3	3	3	4	4	4	3	3	4	4	4	3	4	4	4	4	4	4	4	4	4	4	4	4	4	4	4	4	4
Sheriff Tiraspol	3	1	1	1	1	1	1	1	1	1	1	1	1	1	1	1	1	1	1	1	1	1	1	1	1	1	1	1	1	1	1	1	1	1	1	1
Speranța Nisporeni	9	9	9	9	9	9	8	7	7	7	7	7	7	7	7	7	7	7	7	7	7	7	7	7	7	7	7	8	8	8	8	9	9	9	9	9
Zimbru Chișinău	7	8	8	8	7	7	7	9	9	9	9	9	9	9	9	9	9	9	9	9	9	9	9	9	9	9	9	9	9	9	9	8	8	8	8	8

Source: fmf.md

== Results by round ==
The following table represents the teams game results in each round.

Team	1	2	3	4	5	6	7	8	9	10	11	12	13	14	15	16	17	18	19	20	21	22	23	24	25	26	27	28	29	30	31	32	33	34	35	36
Codru Lozova	L	L	L	L	L	L	L	L	L	D	D	L	L	L	L	L	L	L	D	W	L	L	L	L	L	L	L	L	L	L	L	L	L	L	W (Note: Technical win)	L
Dacia Buiucani	W	D	L	W	L	W	L	L	L	W	L	W	L	D	W	D	L	D	W	D	D	D	L	W	W	L	L	D	L	W	L	L	W	W	W	D
Dinamo-Auto	W	L	W	W	L	L	D	L	W	W	D	L	D	D	L	D	D	W	W	D	D	W	L	L	W	D	W	L	D	L	D	L	L	D	W	W
Florești	L	W	L	L	D	L	L	W	L	L	D	L	W	D	L	L	W	L	L	L	L	D	D	L	L	L	W	W	L	L	W	W	L	L	W	L
Milsami Orhei	D	D	W	L	L	W	W	W	W	W	W	W	D	L	W	W	D	W	L	D	W	W	L	W	W	D	W	D	W	W	W	L	W	W	L	W
Petrocub Hîncești	D	W	W	W	W	W	W	L	W	L	D	W	W	D	W	W	W	W	W	D	W	W	W	W	W	D	W	D	D	W	W	W	W	W	L	D
Sfîntul Gheorghe	W	L	W	W	W	W	L	W	W	D	W	D	D	W	L	W	W	D	L	W	L	L	W	W	L	W	W	W	L	W	L	W	W	L	L	W
Sheriff Tiraspol	W	W	W	W	W	W	W	W	W	W	W	W	W	W	W	L	D	W	W	W	W	W	W	W	W	D	W	W	W	W	W	W	W	W	W	D
Speranța Nisporeni	L	D	L	L	D	L	W	W	L	L	W	L	D	D	L	D	W	L	L	D	L	L	D	L	L	L	L	L	W	L	D	L	L (Note: Technical loss)	L	L	L
Zimbru Chișinău	L	D	L	L	W	L	D	L	L	L	L	L	L	W	L	D	L	L	L	D	L	L	W	L	L	L	D	W	W	L	L	W	L	D	L	D

== Top goalscorers ==
Rank	Player	Club	Goals
1	(Colombia) Frank Castañeda	Sheriff	28
2	(Moldova) Vladimir Ambros	Petrocub	16
3	(Moldova) Alexandru Antoniuc	Milsami	15
4	(Belarus) Roman Volkov	Sfîntul Gheorghe	12
4	(Moldova) Maxim Mihaliov	Dinamo-Auto	12
6	(Moldova) Andrei Cobeț	Florești	11
6	(Moldova) Sergiu Plătică	Petrocub	11
8	(Moldova) Artiom Puntus	Milsami	10
8	(Greece) Dimitris Kolovos	Sheriff	10
8	(Moldova) Vadim Crîcimari	Dacia Buiucani	10
8	(Moldova) Artur Pătraș	Zimbru	10

== Clean sheets ==
Rank	Player	Club	Clean sheets
1	(Moldova) Cristian Avram	Petrocub	15
2	(Moldova) Emil Tîmbur	Milsami	14
3	(Moldova) Dumitru Coval	Dacia Buiucani	12
4	(Serbia) Dušan Marković	Sheriff	10
4	(Croatia) Zvonimir Mikulić	Sheriff	10
6	(Moldova) Dumitru Celeadnic	Sheriff	9
7	(Moldova) Victor Străistari	Dinamo-Auto	6
7	(Moldova) Nicolae Calancea	Sfîntul Gheorghe	6
9	(Moldova) Vladislav Liharev	Florești	5
10	(Portugal) Mickaël Meira	Petrocub	4
10	(Moldova) Anatol Chirinciuc	Speranța	4

== Hat-tricks ==
Player	Home	Away	Result	Date
(Moldova) Vladimir Ambros	Petrocub	Codru	7–0	17 July 2020
(Cameroon) Anatole Abang	Sheriff	Dinamo-Auto	6–0	26 July 2020
(Moldova) Maxim Mihaliov	Florești	Dinamo-Auto	0–5	18 September 2020
(Ukraine) Andriy Bliznichenko	Sheriff	Florești	5–0	24 October 2020
(Moldova) Vladimir Ambros	Codru	Petrocub	1–9	23 February 2021
(Moldova) Alexandru Dedov	Milsami	Codru	7–2	12 March 2021
(Tajikistan) Shahrom Samiev	Dinamo-Auto	Zimbru	3–0	12 March 2021
(Slovenia) Lovro Bizjak	Speranța	Sheriff	0–10	16 April 2021
(Malawi) Peter Banda	Codru	Sheriff	0–6	29 April 2021
(Colombia) Frank Castañeda	Dinamo-Auto	Sheriff	0–7	15 May 2021
(Belarus) Roman Volkov	Florești	Sfîntul Gheorghe	0–4	16 May 2021
