= Mudimu =

Mudimu is a surname. Notable people with the surname include:

- Alec Mudimu, Zimbabwean footballer
- Refiloe Johannes Mudimu, South African military commander
