= Gaiu =

Gaiu may refer to:

- Gaiu Mic, a village in Moravița Commune, Timiș County, Romania
- Gaiu Mare, the Romanian name for Veliki Gaj village, Plandište municipality, Serbia
- Valeriu Gaiu, a Moldovan footballer
- Graphic Arts International Union
