= Veaceslav Sofroni =

Moldovan footballer

Personal information
- Date of birth: 30 April 1984 (age 42)
- Height: 1.85 m (6 ft 1 in)
- Position: Striker

Senior career*
Years	Team	Apps	(Gls)
2002–2003	Politehnica Chişinău	9	(0)
2004–2005	Roso Floreni	13	(5)
2005–2006	Irtysh Pavlodar	50	(8)
2006–2007	Politehnica Chişinău	5	(0)
2007	Atyrau	13	(4)
2008	Vėtra	9	(3)
2008	Atyrau	8	(1)
2009	Zimbru Chişinău	26	(7)
2010–2011	Baku	24	(3)
2011–2012	Costuleni	24	(1)
2013–2014	Speranța Crihana	23	(1)
2014–2015	Costuleni	11	(3)
2015	Academia Chișinău	10	(1)
2016–2018	Spicul Chișcăreni	17	(4)
2018–2019	Spartanii Selemet	8	(0)
Total		250	(41)

International career
2009–2010	Moldova	9	(2)

Managerial career
- 2018–2019: Spartanii Selemet (player-coach)
- 2019: Zimbru Chișinău (caretaker coach)
- 2020–2021: Spartanii Selemet
- * Club domestic league appearances and goals

Veaceslav Sofroni (born 30 April 1984) is a retired Moldovan professional football player and current head coach of Spartanii Selemet.

== Career ==
=== Coaching career ===
In the summer 2018, Sofroni was appointed player-coach of Spartanii Selemet. He left the position one year later, in the summer 2019.

On 1 November 2019, Sofroni became the head coach of FC Zimbru Chișinău, however, on interim basis. He left the position one month later, when Sandro Pochesci was hired. In the summer 2020, Sofroni returned to Spartanii Selemet as the club's head coach.

== Club statistics ==
Club performance			League		Cup		Continental		Total	
Season	Club	League	Apps	Goals	Apps	Goals	Apps	Goals	Apps	Goals
2009–10	Baku	Azerbaijan Premier League	10	1	4	1	0	0	14	2
2010–11	Baku	Azerbaijan Premier League	14	2	2	0	1	0	18	1
Total	Azerbaijan		24	3	6	1	1	0	31	4
Career total			24	3	6	1	1	0	31	4

== International career ==
=== International goals ===
Scores and results list Moldova's goal tally first.

No	Date	Venue	Opponent	Score	Result	Competition
1.	6 June 2009	Mikheil Meskhi Stadium, Tbilisi, Georgia	Georgia	1–0	2–1	Friendly
2.	14 October 2009	Skonto Stadium, Riga, Latvia	Latvia	2–3	2–3	2010 FIFA World Cup qualification
