= Anatole Abang =

Cameroonian footballer

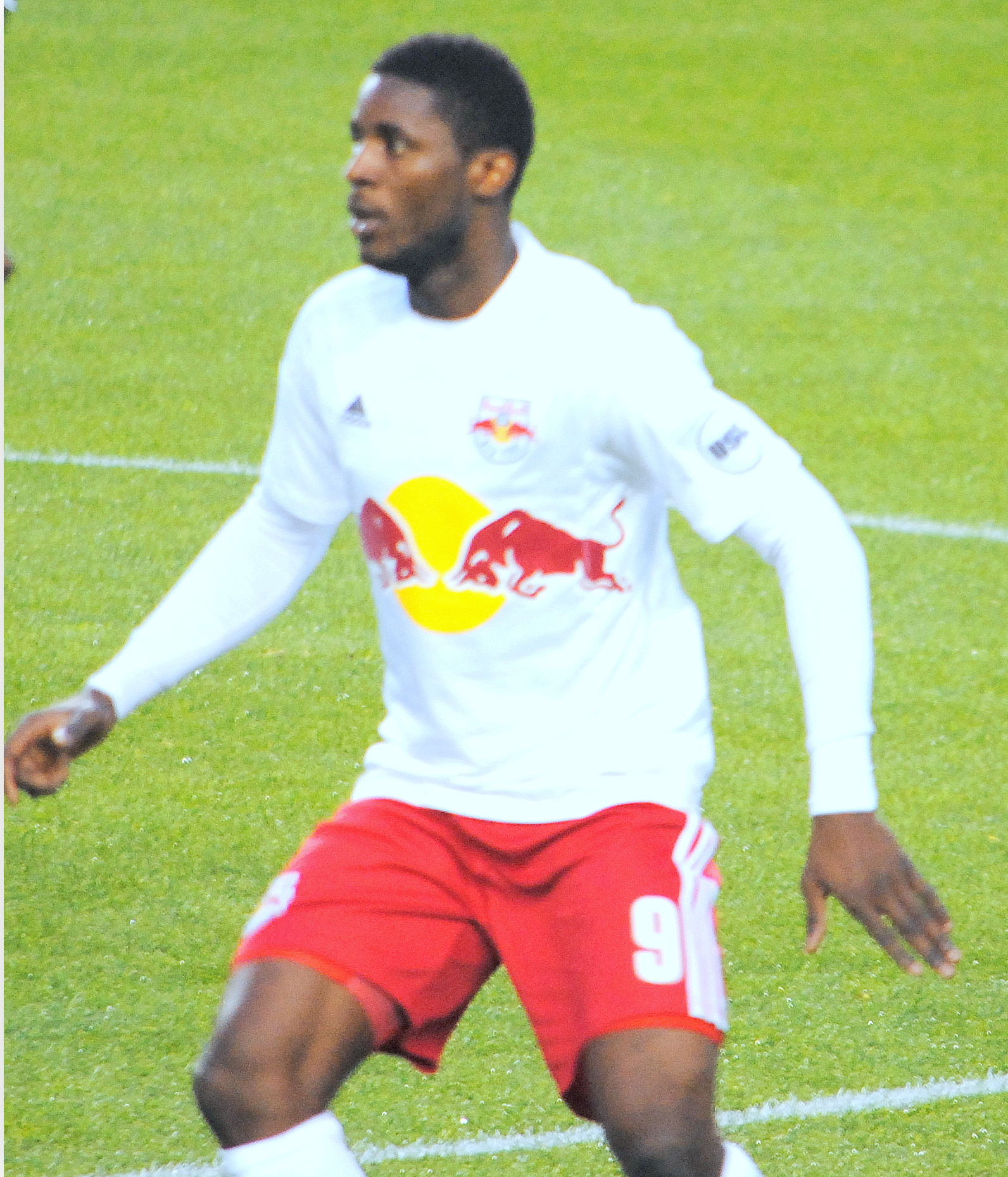
- Abang playing for New York Red Bulls in 2015

Personal information
- Full name: Anatole Bertrand Abang
- Date of birth: 6 July 1996 (age 30)
- Place of birth: Yaoundé, Cameroon
- Height: 1.81 m (5 ft 11 in)
- Position: Forward

Youth career
- AS Fortuna de Yaounde

Senior career*
Years	Team	Apps	(Gls)
2014	Rainbow Bamenda	0	(0)
2015–2018	New York Red Bulls	25	(4)
2015–2016	→ New York Red Bulls II (loan)	14	(8)
2016–2017	→ Hobro IK (loan)	10	(3)
2017	→ SJK (loan)	6	(0)
2017–2018	→ Astra Giurgiu (loan)	26	(5)
2018	→ New York Red Bulls II (loan)	7	(3)
2019	Nantong Zhiyun	12	(6)
2020	Sheriff Tiraspol	8	(5)
2021	Keşla	23	(4)
2022–2026	Al Bataeh	84	(29)
2026	Al-Ittihad	11	(2)

International career^{‡}
2012–2013	Cameroon U17		
2014	Cameroon U20		
2016	Cameroon	6	(1)
- * Club domestic league appearances and goals as of 15 March 2025 ‡ National team caps and goals as of 6 September 2016

Anatole Bertrand Abang (born 6 July 1996) is a Cameroonian professional footballer who plays as a forward.

== Early life ==
Abang was born in Yaoundé, and started his career with local side AS Fortuna de Yaounde. His rights were subsequently purchased by Rainbow Bamenda.

== Club career ==
=== New York Red Bulls ===
In early 2015 Abang went on trial with New York Red Bulls of Major League Soccer. Abang impressed during the 2015 pre-season and on 5 March 2015 the Red Bulls announced that they had completed Abang's transfer from Rainbow FC. Abang made his professional debut for New York on 8 March 2015 coming on as a second-half substitute in a 1–1 draw at Sporting Kansas City. On 6 June 2015 Abang scored his first goal for the senior team in 4–2 loss versus Houston Dynamo. On 28 June 2015 Abang assisted Chris Duvall on his 52nd-minute goal which helped Red Bulls to a 2–1 lead, in an eventual 3-1 derby victory over New York City FC. A few days later, on 1 July 2015 Abang helped the Red Bulls to a victory in the US Open Cup over local rival New York Cosmos, scoring the go ahead goal in a 4–1 victory. On 1 August 2015 Abang scored New York's final goal in a 3–1 away victory over Philadelphia Union.

==== Loan to New York Red Bulls II ====
During the 2015 season Abang was loaned to New York Red Bulls II. On 4 April 2015 in his first match with the team Abang opened the scoring for New York Red Bulls II, scoring the first goal in club history in a 4–1 victory over Toronto FC II. On 18 April 2015 Abang scored the equalising goal for New York Red Bulls II in a 1–1 draw against the Charleston Battery. On 17 May 2015 Abang scored the lone goal for New York Red Bulls II in another 1–1 draw against Charleston Battery. On 24 May 2015 Abang scored New York's opening goal in a 3–2 victory over FC Montreal.

On 10 April 2016 Abang scored his first goal of the season, helping New York Red Bulls II to a 4–0 victory over Bethlehem Steel FC. On 7 May 2016 Abang scored his second goal of the season in 3–1 victory over Pittsburgh Riverhounds.

==== Loan to Hobro IK ====
On 22 August 2016, it was announced by Hobro IK that they had acquired Abang on loan for the 2016–17 Danish 1st Division season. While with the club, Abang scored three goals in 10 league matches. The loan deal was cancelled six months before time and Abang went back to New York Red Bulls on 31 January 2017.

==== Loan to SJK ====
On 28 March 2017, it was announced by SJK that they had acquired Abang on loan until July 2017. On 10 May 2017, SJK announced that they had terminated Abang's loan deal.

==== Loan to Astra Giurgiu ====
On 9 August 2017, Abang was loaned to the Romanian first division club, FC Astra Giurgiu until July 2018. While with the Romanian side Abang appeared in 29 matches and scored 5 goals.

=== Nantong Zhiyun ===
On 19 February 2019, Abang transferred to China League One newcomer Nantong Zhiyun.

=== Sheriff Tiraspol ===
On 6 February 2020, Abang joined FC Sheriff Tiraspol.

=== Keşla ===
On 26 December 2020, Abang signed a one-year contract with Keşla FK. Abang left Keşla at the end of his contract.

== International career ==
Abang has represented Cameroon at the Under-17 level, making his debut with the squad in 2012. He is also a part of Cameroon's Under-20 player pool.

On 10 March 2016, Abang was called up to Cameroon's senior squad for Africa Cup of Nations qualifier against South Africa.

== Career statistics ==
=== Club ===
As of 15 March 2025

Club	Season	League			Cup		League Cup		Continental		Total	
Club	Season	Division	Apps	Goals	Apps	Goals	Apps	Goals	Apps	Goals	Apps	Goals
New York Red Bulls	2015	MLS	17	4	2	1	2	1	0	0	21	6
New York Red Bulls	2016	MLS	8	0	0	0	0	0	0	0	8	0
New York Red Bulls	Total		25	4	2	1	2	1	0	0	29	6
New York Red Bulls II (loan)	2015	USL Championship	6	4	0	0	–		–		6	4
New York Red Bulls II (loan)	2016	USL Championship	8	4	0	0	–		–		8	4
New York Red Bulls II (loan)	Total		14	8	0	0	0	0	0	0	14	8
Hobro IK (loan)	2016–17	Danish 1st Division	10	3	0	0	–		–		10	3
SJK Seinäjoki (loan)	2017	Veikkausliiga	6	0	0	0	–		–		6	0
Astra Giurgiu (loan)	2017–18	Liga I	26	5	3	0	–		–		29	5
New York Red Bulls II (loan)	2018	USL Championship	7	3	–		2	0	–		9	3
Nantong Zhiyun	2019	China League One	12	6	1	0	–		–		13	6
Sheriff Tiraspol	2020–21	Moldovan Super Liga	8	5	–		–		2 (Note: Appearances in UEFA Champions League)	1	10	6
Keşla	2020–21	Azerbaijan Premier League	13	0	5	1	–		–		18	1
Keşla	2021–22	Azerbaijan Premier League	10	4	–		–		0	0	10	4
Keşla	Total		23	4	5	1	0	0	0	0	28	5
Al Bataeh	2022–23	UAE Pro League	23	6	3	1	2	0	–		28	7
Al Bataeh	2023–24	UAE Pro League	25	8	1	0	2	1	–		28	9
Al Bataeh	2024–25	UAE Pro League	16	9	1	0	2	2	–		19	11
Al Bataeh	Total		64	23	5	1	6	3	0	0	75	27
Career total			195	61	16	3	10	4	2	1	223	69

=== International goals ===
Scores and results list Cameroon's goal tally first.

Goal	Date	Venue	Opponent	Score	Result	Competition
1.	6 September 2016	Limbe Stadium, Limbe, Cameroon	Gabon	1–0	2–1	Friendly

== Honors ==
New York Red Bulls

- MLS Supporters' Shield (2): 2015, 2018
