= Andriy Bliznichenko =

Ukrainian football midfielder

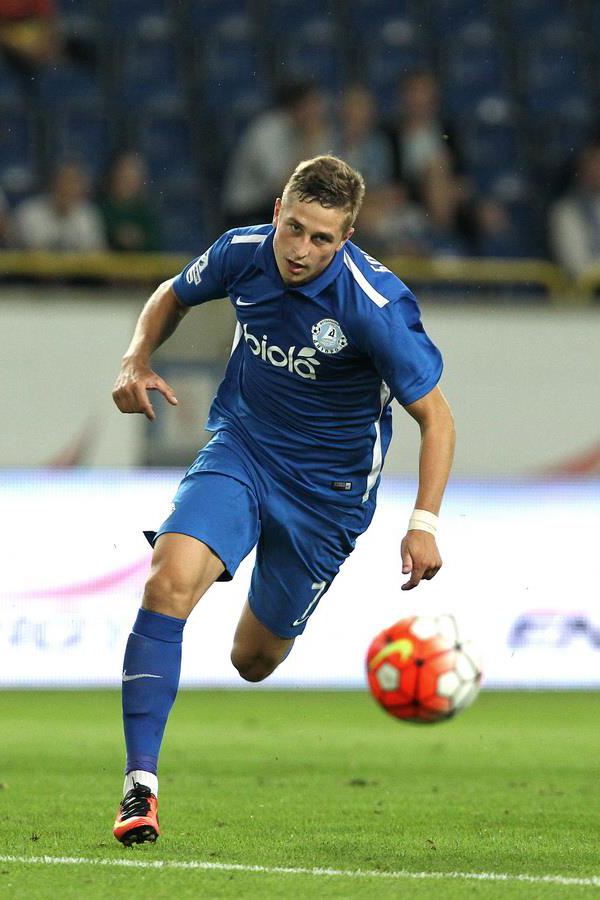
- Andriy Bliznichenko in 2016

Personal information
- Full name: Andriy Valeriyovych Bliznichenko
- Date of birth: 24 July 1994 (age 32)
- Place of birth: Novohrad-Volynskyi, Ukraine
- Height: 1.77 m (5 ft 10 in)
- Position: Right winger

Team information
- Current team: Probiy Horodenka
- Number: 18

Youth career
- 2007–2011: Metalurh Zaporizhzhia

Senior career*
Years	Team	Apps	(Gls)
2012–2017	Dnipro	26	(5)
2017–2018	Kardemir Karabükspor	34	(1)
2019–2021	Sheriff Tiraspol	21	(11)
2022	Inhulets Petrove	4	(0)
2023–2024	Veres Rivne	25	(6)
2024	Zviahel	2	(0)
2024–2025	Metalurh Zaporizhzhia	28	(5)
2026–	Probiy Horodenka	10	(3)

International career
2010	Ukraine U16	14	(1)
2009–2011	Ukraine U17	22	(3)
2011–2012	Ukraine U18	4	(2)
2012–2013	Ukraine U19	13	(4)
2014	Ukraine U20	3	(0)
2014–2017	Ukraine U21	17	(2)
- * Club domestic league appearances and goals as of 4 June 2026

Andriy Valeriyovych Bliznichenko (Ukrainian: Андрій Валерійович Блiзнiченко; born 24 July 1994) is a Ukrainian professional footballer who plays as a right winger for Probiy Horodenka.

== Career ==
Bliznichenko joined FC Dnipro starting in the 2012–13 season, playing 14 games for the reserve team and scoring 6 goals. He debuted for the senior team on 28 November 2013 in a Europa League group stage match against CS Pandurii Târgu Jiu, coming on for Bruno Gama and playing the entire second half. On 9 January 2023 he moved to Veres Rivne.

== Honours ==
Sheriff Tiraspol

- Moldovan National Division: 2020–21

Dnipro

- Ukrainian Premier League: Runner-Up 2013–14
- UEFA Europa League: Runner-Up 2014–15

== Personal life ==
Andriy Bliznichenko is the older brother of fellow footballer, Viktor Bliznichenko.
