= Sandro Pochesci =

Italian football coach and former player (born 1963)

Personal information
- Full name: Alessandro Pochesci
- Date of birth: October 9, 1963 (age 63)
- Place of birth: Rome, Italy

Team information
- Current team: L'Aquila 1927 (head coach)

Managerial career
- Years: Team
- 1998–1999: Polisportiva Borghesiana
- 1999–2003: Torbellamonaca
- 2003–2006: Guidonia
- 2006–2007: Viterbese (assistant)
- 2007–2008: Olbia
- 2008–2009: Flaminia Civita Castellana
- 2009–2010: Monterotondo
- 2010–2011: Lupa Frascati
- 2011–2012: Monterotondo Lupa
- 2012: Cynthia
- 2013–2014: Ostia Mare
- 2014–2017: Fondi
- 2017–2018: Ternana
- 2019: Casertana
- 2019: Bisceglie
- 2020: Zimbru Chișinău
- 2020–2021: Carpi
- 2021: Carpi
- 2023: Juve Stabia
- 2024: Avezzano
- 2025–: L'Aquila 1927

Sandro Pochesci (born 9 October 1963) is an Italian football coach and former player, currently in charge of Serie D club L'Aquila 1927.

== Career ==
After a career as a player cut almost entirely spent in the amateur leagues, he started his coaching career in the regional divisions of Lazio. He then moved to Serie C2 club Viterbese, officially appearing as an assistant due to him not having the coaching badges to serve professionally as head coach. The same happened with Olbia, for which he worked from July to November 2007. He then served as head coach of Serie D clubs such as Flaminia Civitacastellana (2008–09), Monterotondo (2009–10), Monterotondo Lupa (2011–12), Cynthia (2012) and Ostiamare (2013–14).

In October 2014 he was named head coach of Fondi after the club's takeover by Università degli Studi Niccolò Cusano. He resigned from the club in February 2016, only to return in charge later in July after it was readmitted to Lega Pro to fill a vacancy.

After an impressive season in charge of the club, and following the takeover of Ternana by the Stefano Bandecchi (owner of the Università degli Studi Niccolò Cusano), he was named new head coach of the Serie B club in July 2017.

He made nationwide news in November 2017 after he commented on Italy's 0–1 loss to Sweden in the 2018 FIFA World Cup qualifiers by defining the Swedish "a team of refugees." He was sacked on 30 January 2018 due to poor results.

On 25 March 2019 he was named new head coach of Serie C club Casertana. After failing to guide the club to promotion, he was not confirmed at the helm of the club.

On 2 October 2019 he was announced as the new head coach of Serie C side Bisceglie in place of Rodolfo Vanoli. He was dismissed on 25 November 2019, after the team only achieved three draws and seven losses in 10 games under his helm.

In December 2019, Pochesci was named as the new head coach of Moldovan National Division side FC Zimbru Chișinău after the club's takeover by Italian investors. In early 2020, before the season had even started, Pochesci resigned from his position as head coach.

On 29 August 2020 he was hired by Serie C club Carpi. He was sacked on 21 January 2021. Less than a month later, on 12 February, he was reinstated to his job as Carpi manager.

On 30 January 2023, Pochesci returned into management as the new head coach of Serie C club Juve Stabia. He was sacked on 19 March 2023, after failing to improve results.

On 27 September 2024, Pochesci was hired as the new head coach of Serie D club Avezzano, but he left the club in december.

In June 2025, Pochesci starts training L'Aquila 1927.
