= Charles Petro =

Malawian footballer (born 2001)

Personal information
- Full name: John Charles Petro
- Date of birth: 8 February 2001 (age 25)
- Place of birth: Blantyre, Malawi
- Height: 1.76 m (5 ft 9 in)
- Positions: Defensive midfielder; defender

Team information
- Current team: Botoșani
- Number: 3

Youth career
- –2018: PremierBet Wizards
- 2018–2019: Big Bullets

Senior career*
Years	Team	Apps	(Gls)
2018–2019	Big Bullets Reserves		
2019–2020	Big Bullets		
2020–2022	Sheriff Tiraspol	43	(2)
2023–	Botoșani	93	(1)

International career^{‡}
2017–2018	Malawi U20		
2019–	Malawi	45	(0)
- * Club domestic league appearances and goals as of 1 November 2026 ‡ National team caps and goals as of 6 October 2026

John Charles Petro (born 8 February 2001) is a Malawian professional footballer who plays as a defensive midfielder or a defender for Liga I club Botoșani and the Malawi national team, which he captains.

== Club career ==
Petro joined Big Bullets in 2018, initially playing with their reserve squad in the second-tier Southern Region Football League before being promoted to the first team ahead of the 2019 season, making an instant impact and playing an instrumental role in their second consecutive Super League championship win. For his performance filling in the gap left by injured team captain John Lanjesi, he was named Defender of the Year while also being nominated for the Player of the Year award at the annual league awards ceremony.

After rejecting a trial with South African side Polokwane City, Petro instead underwent a month-long trial at Moldovan side Sheriff Tiraspol in early 2020. He officially made the move to the club by signing a three-year deal in February.

On 7 March 2023, Petro signed with Romanian Liga I club Botoșani on a two-year deal. At the time, he was one of only two Malawian footballers playing in Europe, along with Kieran Ngwenya. Petro made his debut for Botoșani in a 1–1 league draw against Mioveni on 10 March.

== International career ==
Petro represented the Malawi national under-20 football team at the 2017 COSAFA U-20 Cup and during the 2019 Africa U-20 Cup of Nations qualifiers.

He made his senior international debut on 20 April 2019, replacing Gomezgani Chirwa during a 0–0 draw against Eswatini in the 2020 African Nations Championship qualifiers. He also played for Malawi at the 2019 COSAFA Cup and 2022 FIFA World Cup qualification.

== Career statistics ==
=== Club ===
As of match played 1 November 2026

Appearances and goals by club, season and competition
Club	Season	League			National cup (Note: Includes Cupa Moldovei, Cupa României)		Continental		Other		Total	
Club	Season	Division	Apps	Goals	Apps	Goals	Apps	Goals	Apps	Goals	Apps	Goals
Big Bullets	2019	Super League of Malawi	?	?	?	?	—		—		?	?
Sheriff Tiraspol	2020–21	Divizia Națională	22	1	1	0	3 (Note: Two appearances in UEFA Champions League, one appearance in UEFA Europa League)	0	—		26	1
Sheriff Tiraspol	2021–22	Divizia Națională	15	1	3	0	5 (Note: Three appearances in UEFA Champions League, two appearances in UEFA Europa League)	0	1 (Note: Appearance in Supercupa Moldovei)	0	24	1
Sheriff Tiraspol	2022–23	Moldovan Super Liga	6	0	1	0	0	0	—		7	0
Sheriff Tiraspol	Total		43	2	5	0	8	0	1	0	57	2
Botoșani	2022–23	Liga I	9	0	—		—		—		9	0
Botoșani	2023–24	Liga I	14	0	3	0	—		2 (Note: Appearances in Liga I promotion/relegation play-offs)	0	19	0
Botoșani	2024–25	Liga I	23	0	3	1	—		—		26	1
Botoșani	2025–26	Liga I	35	1	1	0	—		1 (Note: Appearance in Liga I European play-offs)	0	37	1
Botoșani	2026–27	Liga I	12	0	3	0	—		—		15	0
Botoșani	Total		93	1	10	1	—		3	0	106	2
Career total			136	3	15	1	8	0	4	0	163	4

=== International ===
As of match played 6 October 2026

Appearances and goals by national team and year
National team	Year	Apps	Goals
Malawi
Malawi	2019	10	0
Malawi	2020	4	0
Malawi	2021	10	0
Malawi	2022	3	0
Malawi	2023	3	0
Malawi	2024	2	0
Malawi	2025	6	0
Malawi	2026	7	0
Total		45	0

== Honours ==
=== Club ===
Big Bullets

- Super League of Malawi: 2019

Sheriff Tiraspol

- Divizia Națională: 2020–21, 2021–22
- Moldovan Cup: 2021–22
- Moldovan Super Cup runner-up: 2021

Individual

- Super League of Malawi Defender of the Year: 2019
