= Max Veloso =

Swiss footballer (born 1992)

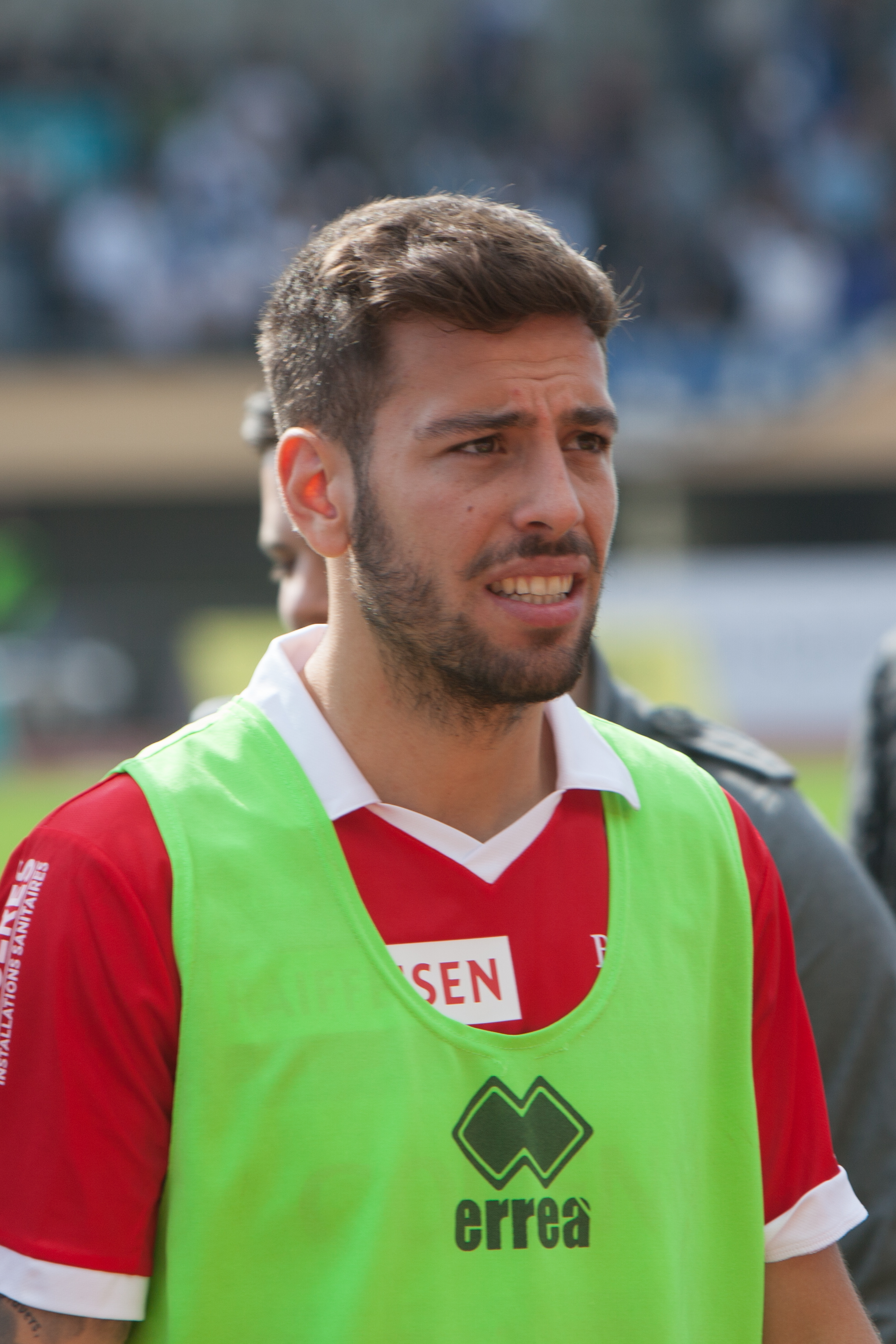
- Veloso in 2014

Personal information
- Full name: Max Veloso Alves
- Date of birth: 27 March 1992 (age 34)
- Place of birth: Aboim da Nóbrega, Portugal
- Height: 1.75 m (5 ft 9 in)
- Position: Midfielder

Team information
- Current team: Étoile Carouge (loan)
- Number: 23

Youth career
- 2001–2009: Xamax

Senior career*
Years	Team	Apps	(Gls)
2009–2012	Xamax	8	(1)
2010–2011	→ Biel (loan)	29	(8)
2012–2015	Sion	13	(1)
2012–2015	Sion U21	39	(9)
2012	→ Vaduz (loan)	10	(0)
2014–2015	→ Lausanne-Sport (loan)	22	(2)
2015–2019	Xamax	109	(12)
2020	Sheriff Tiraspol	6	(2)
2021–2023	Xamax	52	(3)
2023–	Servette U21	0	(0)
2023–	→ Étoile Carouge (loan)	2	(0)

International career
2011–2012	Switzerland U20	8	(0)
2013–2014	Switzerland U21	6	(1)
- * Club domestic league appearances and goals as of 26 October 2023

Max Veloso Alves (born 27 March 1992) is a Swiss footballer who plays as a midfielder for Étoile Carouge, on loan from Servette U21.

== Career ==
Veloso began his career with Xamax and was on 4 June 2009 promoted to the Swiss Super League team. In his first senior year for Xamax he did not play a minute and was loaned out to Biel on 17 May 2010.

In May 2013 he made his debut in the first team of Sion, scoring his first goal on 2 June.

On 25 June 2021, he returned to Xamax on a one-year deal.
