= Omar Gaye =

Gambian footballer

Personal information
- Date of birth: 18 September 1998 (age 28)
- Place of birth: Banjul, Gambia
- Height: 1.82 m (6 ft 0 in)
- Position: Left back

Team information
- Current team: Olbia

Senior career*
Years	Team	Apps	(Gls)
2016–2017	Afro Napoli		
2017–2018	Juve Stabia	0	(0)
2018–2019	Viareggio	28	(3)
2019–2020	Nola	18	(0)
2020	Kajaani	3	(0)
2020–2021	Milsami Orhei	28	(1)
2021–2022	Maccabi Netanya	0	(0)
2023–2024	Anacapri	0	(0)
2024	Chieti	9	(1)
2024–2025	Francavilla	18	(1)
2026–	Olbia	0	(0)

International career^{‡}
2021–	Gambia	6	(0)
- * Club domestic league appearances and goals as of 03:25, 10 March 2026 (UTC) ‡ National team caps and goals as of 03:18, 9 June 2021 (UTC)

Omar Gaye (born 18 September 1998) is a Gambian professional footballer who plays as a left back for Serie D club Olbia and the Gambia national team.

== Career ==
Orphaned at the age of 11, Gaye played football in Europe to support his two siblings. Gaye arrived to Italy as a migrant in 2016. After arriving to Italy, Gaye started playing football for Afro Napoli.

From Afro Napoli, Gaye moved to Juve Stabia in August 2017. He had stints at the Italian clubs Viareggio, and Nola before moving to Finland with Kajaani. He transferred to Milsami Orhei in Moldova shortly after for the 2020–21 season. Gaye made his professional debut with Milsami Orhei in a 3–0 Moldovan National Division win over Speranța Nisporeni on 13 July 2020.

== International career ==
Gaye debuted for the Gambia in a 1–0 friendly win over Togo on 8 June 2021.
