= Frank Castañeda =

Colombian footballer (born 1994)

Personal information
- Full name: Frank Andersson Castañeda Vélez
- Date of birth: 17 July 1994 (age 32)
- Place of birth: Cali, Colombia
- Height: 1.72 m (5 ft 8 in)
- Positions: Winger; forward

Team information
- Current team: Cúcuta Deportivo

Senior career*
Years	Team	Apps	(Gls)
2016	Caracas	0	(0)
2016–2018	Orsomarso	42	(4)
2018	→ Senica (loan)	7	(5)
2018–2020	Senica	47	(13)
2020–2022	Sheriff Tiraspol	52	(34)
2022	Warta Poznań	13	(4)
2022	Buriram United	9	(3)
2023	Radomiak Radom	27	(2)
2024	Independiente Santa Fe	10	(0)
2024–2025	Atlético Bucaramanga	32	(8)
2025–2026	Banfield	11	(0)
2026–	Cúcuta Deportivo	2	(0)
- * Club domestic league appearances and goals as of 00:00, 8 February 2026 (UTC)

Frank Andersson Castañeda Vélez (born 17 July 1994) is a Colombian professional footballer who plays as a winger or a forward for Categoría Primera A club Cúcuta Deportivo.

== Club career ==
=== FK Senica ===
Castañeda made his professional Fortuna liga debut for Senica against Železiarne Podbrezová on 3 March 2018, in a 1–0 home win.

=== Sheriff Tiraspol ===
On 30 December 2019, Sheriff Tiraspol announced that they had an agreement to sign Castañeda, with the deal being completed on 20 January 2020.

=== Warta Poznań ===
On 11 February 2022, having already agreed to join Thai side Buriram United from 1 July 2022, Castañeda moved to Polish Ekstraklasa side Warta Poznań, signing a short-term deal until the end of June.

== Career statistics ==
As of match played 21 May 2022

Appearances and goals by club, season and competition
Club	Season	League			National cup (Note: Includes Copa Colombia, Slovak Cup, Moldovan Cup)		Continental		Other		Total	
Club	Season	Division	Apps	Goals	Apps	Goals	Apps	Goals	Apps	Goals	Apps	Goals
Orsomarso	2016	Categoría Primera B	29	4	1	0	—		—		30	4
Orsomarso	2017	Categoría Primera B	13	0	3	0	—		—		16	0
Orsomarso	2018	Categoría Primera B	0	0	0	0	—		—		0	0
Orsomarso	Total		42	4	4	0	—		—		46	4
Senica (loan)	2017–18	Slovak Super Liga	7	5	0	0	—		2 (Note: Appearances in the relegation play-offs)	0	9	5
Senica	2018–19	Slovak Super Liga	30	5	6	6	—		—		36	11
Senica	2019–20	Slovak Super Liga	17	8	2	0	—		—		19	8
Senica	Total		47	13	8	6	—		—		55	19
Sheriff Tiraspol	2020–21	Moldovan National Division	35	28	5	4	3 (Note: Two appearances and one goal in UEFA Champions League, one appearance in UEFA Europa League)	1	—		43	33
Sheriff Tiraspol	2021–22	Moldovan National Division	17	6	1	1	12 (Note: Appearances in UEFA Champions League)	2	1 (Note: Appearance in Moldovan Super Cup)	0	31	9
Sheriff Tiraspol	Total		52	34	6	5	15	3	1	0	74	42
Warta Poznań	2021–22	Ekstraklasa	13	4	—		—		—		13	4
Career total			161	60	18	11	15	3	3	0	197	74
