= Alec Mudimu =

Zimbabwean footballer (born 1995)

Personal information
- Date of birth: 8 April 1995 (age 31)
- Place of birth: Harare, Zimbabwe
- Height: 6 ft 1 in (1.85 m)
- Position: Midfielder

Team information
- Current team: Holywell Town
- Number: 4

Youth career
- Sheffield Wednesday
- 2011–2012: Stalybridge Celtic

Senior career*
Years	Team	Apps	(Gls)
2012–2016	Stalybridge Celtic	42	(5)
2015	→ Radcliffe Borough (loan)		
2016–2017	Northwich Victoria		
2017	Stockport Town		
2017–2020	Cefn Druids	64	(12)
2020–2021	Sheriff Tiraspol	6	(1)
2021	Ankaraspor	15	(0)
2021–2022	Torpedo Kutaisi	12	(0)
2022	Altrincham	2	(0)
2022	Saburtalo Tbilisi		
2022–2023	Caernarfon Town	5	(0)
2023	Flint Town United	5	(0)
2023	Olympique de Béja	0	(0)
2024	Flint Town United	2	(0)
2025–2026	Flint Town United	20	(1)
2026–	Holywell Town	5	(0)

International career^{‡}
2018–	Zimbabwe	24	(0)
- * Club domestic league appearances and goals as of 15:28, 31 August 2026 (UTC) ‡ National team caps and goals as of 20:39, 7 September 2021 (UTC)

Alec Mudimu (born 8 April 1995) is a Zimbabwean professional footballer who plays as a midfielder] for Cymru Premier side Holywell Town. He is a Zimbabwean international player.

== Early and personal life ==
Mudimu was born in Harare, Zimbabwe, and moved to England at the age of five or six, living in Hertfordshire and London.

== Club career ==
Mudimu played youth football for Sheffield Wednesday and Stalybridge Celtic, joining the latter club in 2011. He made his senior debut in the 2012–13 season. He moved on loan to Radcliffe Borough in January 2015.

He later played for Northwich Victoria and Stockport Town before joining Welsh Premier League side Cefn Druids in July 2017. He made his league debut for the club on 8 September 2017 in a 4–0 away defeat to TNS. He scored his first league goal for the club on 30 September 2017 in a 2–1 away victory over Llandudno, scoring in the 18th minute. He went on trial with English Football League club Fleetwood Town in December 2017. He also spent time on trial with Rochdale.

On 11 December 2019, Moldovan club Sheriff Tiraspol announced the signing of Mudimu from 20 January 2020.

In January 2021 he signed for Turkish club Ankaraspor.

After spending time in Georgia with Torpedo Kutaisi, he returned to England in February 2022 to sign for Altrincham. On 27 February 2022, Mudimu left Altrincham after making just two league appearances for the club.

On 23 August 2022, Saburtalo Tbilisi announced the signing of Mudimu.

On 9 March 2023, he signed for Flint Town United after being released by Caernarfon Town.

On 16 August 2023, he signed for Tunisian Ligue Professionnelle 1 club Olympique Béja following his departure from Flint Town United. He was released in December 2023 after making only two appearances.

In August 2025 he returned to Flint Town United for a third spell at the club having also signed for them briefly the previous season. He departed from the club at the end of the 2025–26 season.

Ahead of the 2026–27 season he signed for newly promoted Cymru Premier side Holywell Town.

== International career ==
Mudimu was called up by the Zimbabwe national team for the first time in March 2018. He made his debut in the semi-final of the 2018 Four Nations Tournament, during a penalty shootout defeat against hosts Zambia on 21 March 2018.

Mudimu was later called up to Zimbabwe's squad for the 2018 COSAFA Cup. Zimbabwe went on to win the tournament, beating Zambia in the final.

In October 2018, he was selected as part of Zimbabwe's squad for Africa Cup of Nations qualifiers.

On 11 December 2025, Mudimu was called up to the Zimbabwe squad for the 2025 Africa Cup of Nations.
