= Valeriu Gaiu =

Moldovan footballer (born 2001)

Personal information
- Date of birth: 6 February 2001 (age 25)
- Place of birth: Moldova
- Height: 1.73 m (5 ft 8 in)
- Position: Right-back

Team information
- Current team: SV Wilhelmshaven
- Number: 5

Youth career
- Real Succes
- Sheriff Tiraspol

Senior career*
Years	Team	Apps	(Gls)
2020–2024	Sheriff Tiraspol	17	(0)
2021	→ Dinamo-Auto (loan)	16	(1)
2022	→ CSF Bălți (loan)	18	(0)
2023	→ Zimbru (loan)	9	(0)
2024	VfL Germania Leer		
2024–	SV Wilhelmshaven	0	(0)

International career^{‡}
2017	Moldova U17	2	(0)
2018–2019	Moldova U19	6	(0)
2020–2022	Moldova U21	12	(0)
- * Club domestic league appearances and goals as of 1 August 2023 ‡ National team caps and goals as of 8 June 2022

Valeriu Gaiu (born 6 February 2001) is a Moldovan professional footballer who plays as a right-back for German club SV Wilhelmshaven.

== Career ==
Gaiu made his debut for Sheriff Tiraspol in the Moldovan National Division on 3 July 2020 in a 2–0 win against Speranța Nisporeni. On 2 July 2021, it was announced that he had joined Dinamo-Auto Tiraspol on a loan deal. In February 2022, he joined Bălți on loan.
