= Anatolie Chirinciuc =

Moldovan football player

Personal information
- Date of birth: 4 February 1989 (age 37)
- Place of birth: Nisporeni, Moldova
- Height: 1.87 m (6 ft 1 1/2 in)
- Position: Goalkeeper

Youth career
- 2007–2008: Zimbru-2 Chișinău

Senior career*
| Years | Team | Apps | (Gls) |
| 2008–2015 | Zimbru Chișinău | 22 | (0) |
| 2012 | → Dunărea Galați (loan) | 6 | (0) |
| 2012 | → Sfântul Gheorghe (loan) | 3 | (0) |
| 2015–2016 | Saxan | 5 | (0) |
| 2016 | Speranța Nisporeni | 1 | (0) |
| 2016–2017 | Livadiakos/Salamina Livadion | 25 | (0) |
| 2017–2019 | Milsami Orhei | 13 | (0) |
| 2020–2021 | Speranța Nisporeni | 12 | (0) |
| 2021–2023 | Zimbru Chișinău | 0 | (0) |

International career
| | Moldova U17 | 3 | (0) |
| | Moldova U19 | 6 | (0) |
| | Moldova U21 | 5 | (0) |
- * Club domestic league appearances and goals

Anatolie Chirinciuc (born 4 February 1989) is a Moldovan former footballer who played as a goalkeeper.

== Honours ==
Zimbru Chișinău

- Moldovan Cup: 2013–14
- Moldovan Super Cup: 2014
