= Peter Banda =

Malawian footballer

Personal information
- Date of birth: 22 September 2000 (age 26)
- Place of birth: Blantyre, Malawi
- Height: 1.69 m (5 ft 7 in)
- Positions: Midfielder; winger

Youth career
- 2017–2019: Griffin Young Stars

Senior career*
Years	Team	Apps	(Gls)
2019–2021	Nyasa Big Bullets FC		
2021	→ Sheriff Tiraspol (loan)	21	(5)
2021–2024	Simba	11	(1)
2024	Church Boys United		

International career
- Malawi U17
- Malawi U20
2019–	Malawi	9	(0)
- * Club domestic league appearances and goals

Peter Banda (born 22 September 2000) is a Malawian professional footballer who plays as a midfielder for the Malawi national team.

== Career ==
Banda started his career with Griffin Young Stars in 2017. In 2018, he trialed for South African club Orlando Pirates. In 2019, he instead joined Big Bullets FC. Before the second half of the 2020–21 season, he signed for FC Sheriff Tiraspol in Moldova after a trial. On 3 August 2021, he signed a three-year contract with Tanzanian Premier League giant Simba.

== Personal life ==
He is the son of former footballer Chikondi Banda.

== Honours ==
Big Bullets

- Super League of Malawi: 2019

Sheriff Tiraspol

- Moldovan National Division: 2020–21
