= Artem Fedorov =

Ukrainian footballer

Personal information
- Full name: Artem Vitaliyovych Fedorov
- Date of birth: 18 September 1998 (age 28)
- Position: Left winger

Team information
- Current team: Sūduva
- Number: 14

Youth career
- 2013–2017: DYuSSh Bilhorod-Dnistrovskyi

Senior career*
Years	Team	Apps	(Gls)
2017	Tyras-2500 Bilhorod-Dnistrovskyi	10	(8)
2019	Pakruojis	25	(4)
2020–2021	Dinamo-Auto Tiraspol	32	(10)
2021–2023	Petrocub Hîncești	32	(3)
2023–	Sūduva	45	(6)
- * Club domestic league appearances and goals as of 11 November 2024

Artem Vitaliyovych Fedorov (Ukrainian: Артем Віталійович Федоров; born 18 September 1998) is a Ukrainian professional footballer who plays as a left winger for Sūduva in Lithuanian A Lyga.

== Career ==
Fedorov played youth football at the local sports school in Bilhorod-Dnistrovskyi, before starting his senior career with Tyras-2500 Bilhorod-Dnistrovskyi in 2017. In 2019, he played for Lithuanian side Pakruojis and between 2020 and 2021 he played for Moldovan side Dinamo-Auto Tiraspol. In September 2021, he signed a three-year contract with another Moldovan club, Petrocub Hîncești.
