= Zvonimir Mikulić =

Croatian footballer (born 1990)

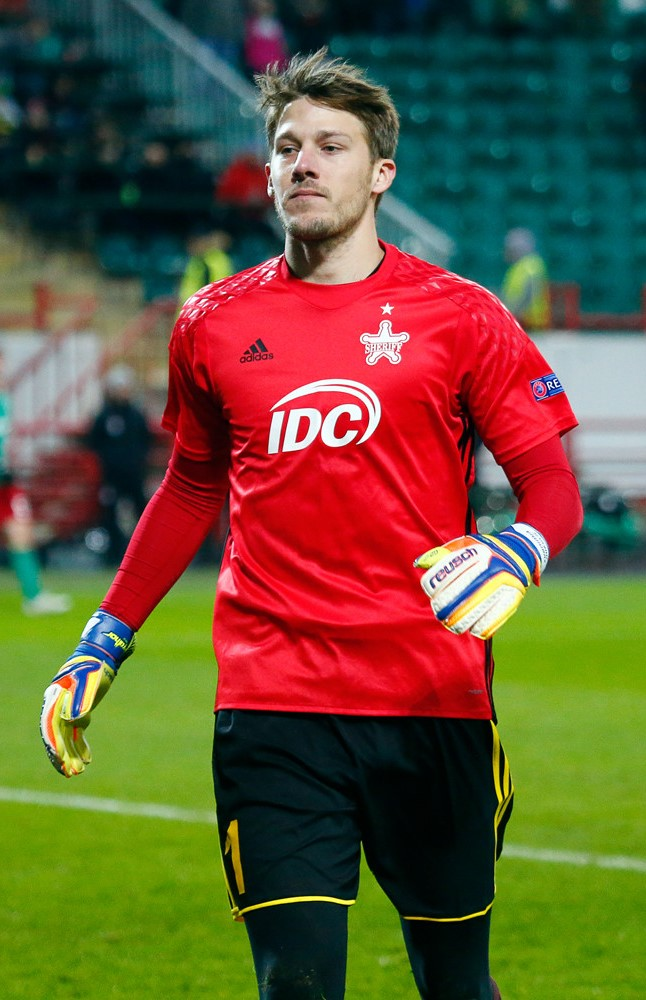
- Mikulić in 2017

Personal information
- Date of birth: 5 February 1990 (age 36)
- Place of birth: Osijek, SFR Yugoslavia
- Height: 1.92 m (6 ft 4 in)
- Position: Goalkeeper

Team information
- Current team: Eendracht Aalst
- Number: 1

Youth career
- 1999–2009: Osijek

Senior career*
Years	Team	Apps	(Gls)
2009–2018	Osijek	124	(0)
2009	→ Olimpija Osijek (loan)	16	(0)
2010–2011	→ Vukovar '91 (loan)	22	(0)
2017–2018	→ Sheriff Tiraspol (loan)	13	(0)
2018–2021	Sheriff Tiraspol	29	(0)
2021	Levski Sofia	13	(0)
2021–2022	Tuzlaspor	15	(0)
2022	FC Brașov	0	(0)
2023	Hebar	2	(0)
2023–	Eendracht Aalst	12	(0)
- * Club domestic league appearances and goals as of 18:22, 7 April 2024 (UTC)

Zvonimir Mikulić (born 5 February 1990) is a Croatian professional footballer who plays as a goalkeeper for Eendracht Aalst.

== Club career ==
Mikulić spent, as of 2015, his entire career, both youth and senior, at his hometown club NK Osijek, apart from two loan spells, half a season at the third-tier NK Olimpija Osijek in 2009 and the 2010–11 season at the second-tier HNK Vukovar '91. An understudy to Ivan Kardum and Ivan Vargić, Mikulić made his Prva HNL debut aged 22, in a home 5–0 win against NK Zadar on 12 May 2012. He became the first choice goalkeeper at his club after Vargić left for HNK Rijeka, at the beginning of 2013.

In August 2023, Mikulić signed for Belgian Division 2 side Eendracht Aalst.

== Personal life ==
Mikulić is a student at the Faculty of Economics in the University of Osijek, and hopes to finish his studies after his career is over.

== Honours ==
Sheriff Tiraspol

- Moldovan National Division: 2017, 2018, 2019
- Moldovan Cup: 2018–19
