= 2022–23 FC Sheriff Tiraspol season =

Sheriff Tiraspol
2022–23 season
- Chairman: Viktor Gushan
- Manager: Stjepan Tomas (until 25 October); Victor Mihailov (Caretaker) (25 October – 9 January); Roberto Bordin (from 9 January)
- Stadium: Sheriff Stadium
- Divizia Naţională: 1st
- Moldovan Cup: Winners
- UEFA Champions League: Third Qualifying Round vs Viktoria Plzeň
- UEFA Europa League: Group stage
- UEFA Europa Conference League: Round of 16 vs Nice
- Top goalscorer: League: Rasheed Akanbi (8); All: Rasheed Akanbi (13)
- Highest home attendance: 8,734 vs Manchester United (15 September 2022)
- Lowest home attendance: 175 vs Dacia Buiucani (5 April 2023)
- Average home league attendance: 2,382 (20 May 2023)
| Home colours | Away colours |

The 2022–23 season was FC Sheriff Tiraspol's 26th season, and their 25th in the Divizia Naţională, the top-flight of Moldovan football. Sheriff are defended their Divizia Naţională title for the eighth season in a row, whilst also winning the Moldovan Cup to complete a domestic double. In European competition, Sheriff reached the Third Qualifying Round of the UEFA Champions League, dropping into the UEFA Europa League Group Stages where they finished third progressing into the UEFA Europa Conference League where they were knocked out by Nice at the Round of 16 stage.

== Season events ==
On 20 June, Sheriff Tiraspol announced the signing of Abou Ouattara from Valenciennes. The following day, 21 June, Sheriff Tiraspol appointed Stjepan Tomas as their new head coach, and the signing of Heron from Vejle. On 22 June, Sheriff Tiraspol announced the signing of Rasheed Akanbi from Kocaelispor.

On 29 June, Sheriff Tiraspol announced the signing of Iyayi Atiemwen from Dinamo Zagreb.

On 12 July, Steve Ambri signed a two-year contract with Sheriff Tiraspol.

On 18 July, Sheriff Tiraspol announced the loan signing of Salifu Mudasiru from Asante Kotoko, with Kay Tejan signing on loan from TOP Oss the following day until December 2022.

On 25 July, Sheriff Tiraspol announced the loan signing of Mouhamed Diop from Kocaelispor, with Giannis Fivos Botos joining on loan from AEK Athens two days later.

On 13 August, Sheriff Tiraspol announced the signing of Maksym Koval from Al Fateh.

On 27 August, Sheriff Tiraspol announced the signing of Armel Zohouri from Lausanne-Sport.

On 30 August, Sheriff Tiraspol announced the signing of Felipe Vizeu from Udinese.

On 25 October, head coach Stjepan Tomas resigned following their first league defeat of the season to Petrocub Hîncești in the Super Liga.

On 9 January, Sheriff Tiraspol announced the return of Roberto Bordin as head coach, who had previously been in charge between 2016 and 2018.

On 13 January, Sheriff Tiraspol announced the signing of Munashe Garananga from Dynamo Brest.

On 16 January, Sheriff Tiraspol announced the signing of Amine Talal from Bastia.

On 2 February, Sheriff Tiraspol announced the signing of Michael López from Oulu and Abdoul Tapsoba on loan from Standard Liège.

On 8 February, Sheriff Tiraspol announced the signing of Christ Bekale from O Sidi Bouzid.

On 11 February, Sheriff Tiraspol announced the signing of Bubacarr Tambedou from Paide Linnameeskond.

On 21 February, Sheriff Tiraspol announced the signing of Origbaajo Ismaila on loan from Kyoto Sanga. The following day, 22 February, Danil Ankudinov joined Armenian Premier League club Van on loan for the remainder of the season.

On 11 March, Sheriff Tiraspol announced the return of Ricardinho who'd previously played for the club between 2013 and 2017.

== Squad ==
As of match played 28 May 2023

| No. | Name | Nationality | Position | Date of birth (age) | Signed from | Signed in | Contract ends | Apps. | Goals |
Goalkeepers
| 1 | Dumitru Celeadnic | (Moldova) | GK | 23 April 1992 (aged 31) | Petrocub Hîncești | 2019 | | 62 | 0 |
| 33 | Serghei Pașcenco | (Moldova) | GK | 18 December 1982 (aged 40) | Zaria Bălți | 2018 | | 127+ | 0 |
| 35 | Maksym Koval | (Ukraine) | GK | 9 December 1992 (aged 30) | Al Fateh | 2022 | | 19 | 0 |
| 40 | Razak Abalora | (Ghana) | GK | 4 September 1996 (aged 26) | Asante Kotoko | 2022 | | 23 | 0 |
Defenders
| 4 | Munashe Garananga | (Zimbabwe) | DF | 18 January 2001 (aged 22) | Dynamo Brest | 2023 | | 14 | 0 |
| 6 | Stjepan Radeljić | (Bosnia and Herzegovina) | DF | 5 September 1997 (aged 25) | Osijek | 2022 | | 84 | 3 |
| 15 | Gaby Kiki | (Cameroon) | DF | 15 February 1995 (aged 28) | Rukh Brest | 2022 | | 50 | 4 |
| 20 | Armel Zohouri | (Ivory Coast) | DF | 5 April 2001 (aged 22) | Lausanne-Sport | 2022 | | 30 | 1 |
| 26 | Artiom Dijinari | (Moldova) | DF | 26 October 2005 (aged 17) | Academy | 2022 | | 1 | 0 |
| 29 | Danila Ignatov | (Moldova) | DF | 19 June 2001 (aged 21) | Academy | 2020 | | 4 | 1 |
| 41 | Stefanos Evangelou | (Greece) | DF | 12 May 1998 (aged 25) | Górnik Zabrze | 2021 | | 16 | 0 |
| 42 | Renan Guedes | (Brazil) | DF | 19 January 1998 (aged 25) | Bahia | 2022 | | 43 | 0 |
Midfielders
| 2 | Patrick Kpozo | (Ghana) | MF | 15 July 1997 (aged 25) | Östersunds | 2022 | | 42 | 0 |
| 8 | Mouhamed Diop | (Senegal) | MF | 30 September 2000 (aged 22) | on loan from Kocaelispor | 2022 | | 35 | 7 |
| 10 | Cedric Badolo | (Burkina Faso) | MF | 4 November 1998 (aged 24) | Pohronie | 2023 | | 52 | 8 |
| 12 | Abdoul Moumouni | (Niger) | MF | 7 August 2002 (aged 20) | US GN | 2021 | | 21 | 0 |
| 14 | Amine Talal | (Morocco) | MF | 5 June 1996 (aged 26) | Bastia | 2023 | | 16 | 1 |
| 18 | Moussa Kyabou | (Mali) | MF | 18 April 1998 (aged 25) | USC Kita | 2021 | | 58 | 0 |
| 22 | Christ Bekale | (Gabon) | MF | 20 March 1999 (aged 24) | O Sidi Bouzid | 2023 | | 9 | 0 |
| 24 | Eugeniu Gliga | (Moldova) | MF | 12 May 2001 (aged 22) | Academy | 2020 | | 13 | 0 |
| 27 | Adrian Hatman | (Moldova) | MF | 5 January 2003 (aged 20) | Real Succes Chișinău | 2021 | | 2 | 1 |
| 31 | Nichita Covali | (Moldova) | MF | 7 September 2002 (aged 20) | Academy | 2022 | | 6 | 0 |
Forwards
| 7 | Abou Ouattara | (Burkina Faso) | FW | 25 December 1999 (aged 23) | Valenciennes | 2022 | | 20 | 2 |
| 9 | Michael López | (Argentina) | FW | 19 August 1997 (aged 25) | Oulu | 2023 | | 9 | 3 |
| 11 | Ricardinho | (Brazil) | FW | 4 September 1989 (aged 33) | Unattached | 2023 | | 139 | 57 |
| 19 | Bubacarr Tambedou | (The Gambia) | FW | 5 April 2002 (aged 21) | on loan from Paide Linnameeskond | 2023 | | 11 | 1 |
| 30 | Abdoul Tapsoba | (Burkina Faso) | FW | 23 August 2001 (aged 21) | on loan from Standard Liège | 2023 | | 16 | 5 |
| 61 | Rasheed Akanbi | (Nigeria) | FW | 9 May 1999 (aged 24) | Kocaelispor | 2022 | | 38 | 13 |
| 80 | Iyayi Atiemwen | (Nigeria) | FW | 24 January 1996 (aged 27) | Dinamo Zagreb | 2022 | | 26 | 4 |
| 99 | Origbaajo Ismaila | (Nigeria) | FW | 4 August 1998 (aged 24) | on loan from Kyoto Sanga | 2023 | 2023 | 12 | 5 |
Out on loan
| 19 | Serafim Cojocari | (Moldova) | MF | 7 January 2001 (aged 22) | Zimbru Chisinau | 2020 | | 7 | 0 |
| 23 | Danil Ankudinov | (Kazakhstan) | FW | 31 July 2003 (aged 19) | Rodina Moscow | 2022 | | 9 | 1 |
| 32 | Valeriu Gaiu | (Moldova) | DF | 6 February 2001 (aged 22) | Academy | 2020 | | 19 | 0 |
| 35 | Evgheni Pleşco | (Moldova) | DF | 25 February 2001 (aged 22) | Academy | 2020 | | 0 | 0 |
| 99 | Momo Yansané | (Guinea) | FW | 29 July 1997 (aged 25) | Nizhny Novgorod | 2021 | | 35 | 13 |
Left during the season
| 3 | Charles Petro | (Malawi) | DF | 8 February 2001 (aged 22) | Big Bullets | 2020 | | 56 | 2 |
| 4 | Heron | (Brazil) | DF | 17 August 2000 (aged 22) | on loan from Goiás | 2022 | 2022 | 18 | 0 |
| 8 | Alexandr Belousov | (Moldova) | DF | 14 May 1998 (aged 25) | Academy | 2018 | | 57 | 4 |
| 9 | Kay Tejan | (Netherlands) | FW | 3 February 1997 (aged 26) | on loan from TOP Oss | 2022 | 2022 | 15 | 1 |
| 11 | Felipe Vizeu | (Brazil) | FW | 12 March 1997 (aged 26) | Udinese | 2022 | | 12 | 2 |
| 16 | Keston Julien | (Trinidad and Tobago) | DF | 26 October 1998 (aged 24) | AS Trenčín | 2020 | | 66 | 2 |
| 17 | Salifu Mudasiru | (Ghana) | MF | 1 April 1997 (aged 26) | loan from Asante Kotoko | 2022 | 2022 | 21 | 0 |
| 21 | Edmund Addo | (Ghana) | MF | 17 May 2000 (aged 23) | Senica | 2021 | | 33 | 1 |
| 22 | Regi Lushkja | (Albania) | MF | 17 May 1996 (aged 27) | Laçi | 2022 | | 24 | 3 |
| 28 | Pernambuco | (Brazil) | FW | 28 April 1998 (aged 25) | on loan from Lviv | 2022 | 2022 | 35 | 6 |
| 30 | Giannis Fivos Botos | (Greece) | MF | 20 December 2000 (aged 22) | on loan from AEK Athens | 2022 | | 11 | 3 |
| 70 | Steve Ambri | (Guinea-Bissau) | FW | 12 August 1997 (aged 25) | Sochaux | 2022 | 2024 | 10 | 5 |

=== Out on loan ===
Note: Flags indicate national team as defined under FIFA eligibility rules; some limited exceptions apply. Players may hold more than one non-FIFA nationality.

| No. | Pos. | Nation | Player |
|---|---|---|---|
| 19 | MF | MDA | Serafim Cojocari (at CSF Bălți) |
| 23 | FW | KAZ | Danil Ankudinov (at Van) |

| No. | Pos. | Nation | Player |
|---|---|---|---|
| 32 | DF | MDA | Valeriu Gaiu (at Zimbru Chișinău) |
| 99 | FW | GUI | Momo Yansané (at Pari NN) |

== Transfers ==
=== In ===
| Date | Position | Nationality | Name | From | Fee | Ref. |
|---|---|---|---|---|---|---|
| 20 June 2022 | FW | (Burkina Faso) | Abou Ouattara | Valenciennes | Undisclosed | |
| 22 June 2022 | FW | (Nigeria) | Rasheed Akanbi | Kocaelispor | Undisclosed | |
| 29 June 2022 | FW | (Nigeria) | Iyayi Atiemwen | Dinamo Zagreb | Undisclosed | |
| 12 July 2022 | FW | (Guinea-Bissau) | Steve Ambri | Sochaux | Undisclosed | |
| 13 August 2022 | GK | (Ukraine) | Maksym Koval | Al Fateh | Undisclosed | |
| 27 August 2022 | DF | (Ivory Coast) | Armel Zohouri | Lausanne-Sport | Undisclosed | |
| 30 August 2022 | FW | (Brazil) | Felipe Vizeu | Udinese | Undisclosed | |
| 1 January 2022 | MF | (Burkina Faso) | Cedric Badolo | Pohronie | Undisclosed | |
| 13 January 2022 | DF | (Zimbabwe) | Munashe Garananga | Dynamo Brest | Undisclosed | |
| 16 January 2022 | MF | (Morocco) | Amine Talal | Bastia | Undisclosed | |
| 2 February 2022 | FW | (Argentina) | Michael López | Oulu | Undisclosed | |
| 8 February 2022 | MF | (Gabon) | Christ Bekale | O Sidi Bouzid | Undisclosed | |
| 11 March 2022 | FW | (Brazil) | Ricardinho | Unattached | Free | |

=== Loans in ===
| Date from | Position | Nationality | Name | From | Date to | Ref. |
|---|---|---|---|---|---|---|
| 9 February 2022 | MF | (Burkina Faso) | Cedric Badolo | Pohronie | 31 December 2022 | |
| 11 February 2022 | FW | (The Gambia) | Bubacarr Tambedou | Paide Linnameeskond | Undisclosed | |
| 21 June 2022 | DF | (Brazil) | Heron | Vejle | 31 December 2022 | |
| 1 July 2022 | FW | (Brazil) | Pernambuco | Lviv | 31 December 2022 | |
| 18 July 2022 | MF | (Ghana) | Salifu Mudasiru | Asante Kotoko | 31 December 2022 | |
| 19 July 2022 | FW | (Netherlands) | Kay Tejan | TOP Oss | 31 December 2022 | |
| 25 July 2022 | MF | (Senegal) | Mouhamed Diop | Kocaelispor | End of season | |
| 27 July 2022 | MF | (Greece) | Giannis Fivos Botos | AEK Athens | End of season | |
| 2 February 2022 | FW | (Burkina Faso) | Abdoul Tapsoba | Standard Liège | Undisclosed | |
| 21 February 2022 | FW | (Nigeria) | Origbaajo Ismaila | Kyoto Sanga | Undisclosed | |

=== Out ===
| Date | Position | Nationality | Name | To | Fee | Ref. |
|---|---|---|---|---|---|---|
| 1 July 2022 | MF | (Moldova) | Vadim Dijinari | Milsami Orhei | Undisclosed | |
| 1 July 2022 | FW | (Mali) | Adama Traoré | Ferencváros | Undisclosed | |
| 6 July 2022 | FW | (Ghana) | Basit Khalid | Al-Tadamon | Undisclosed | |
| 17 July 2022 | DF | (Peru) | Gustavo Dulanto | Riga | Undisclosed | |
| 6 September 2022 | DF | (Moldova) | Evgheni Plesco | Florești | Undisclosed | |
| 10 January 2023 | MF | (Albania) | Regi Lushkja | Tirana | Undisclosed | |
| 10 January 2023 | MF | (Ghana) | Edmund Addo | Spartak Subotica | Undisclosed | |

=== Loans out ===
| Date from | Position | Nationality | Name | To | Date to | Ref. |
|---|---|---|---|---|---|---|
| 8 September 2022 | FW | (Guinea) | Momo Yansané | Pari NN | End of season | |
| 31 January 2023 | FW | (Moldova) | Valeriu Gaiu | Zimbru Chișinău | 31 December 2023 | |
| 22 February 2023 | FW | (Kazakhstan) | Danil Ankudinov | Van | End of season | |

=== Released ===
| Date | Position | Nationality | Name | Joined | Date | Ref. |
|---|---|---|---|---|---|---|
| 31 December 2022 | DF | (Malawi) | Charles Petro | Botoșani | 1 January 2023 | |
| 31 December 2022 | DF | (Moldova) | Alexandr Belousov | Spartak Varna | 1 January 2023 | |
| 31 December 2022 | FW | (Brazil) | Felipe Vizeu | Atlético Goianiense | 1 January 2023 | |
| 16 January 2023 | FW | (Guinea-Bissau) | Steve Ambri | Nîmes | 30 January 2023 | |
| 3 May 2023 | DF | (Trinidad and Tobago) | Keston Julien | | | |

== Friendlies ==
| 24 June 2022 | Sheriff Tiraspol | 4–1 | CSF Bălți |
| EEST (UTC+3) | Ouattara; Evangelou; Ankudinov; Cojocari | Report | Goal |

| 29 June 2022 | Sheriff Tiraspol | 4–1 | Milsami Orhei |
| EEST (UTC+3) | Akanbi; Pernambuco; Yansané; Lushkja | Report | Goal |

| 22 January 2023 | Sheriff Tiraspol | 5–0 | Dinamo-Auto Tiraspol |
| EET (UTC+2) | | Report |

| 30 January 2023 | Sheriff Tiraspol (Moldova) | 2–1 | (Uzbekistan) Olympic Tashkent | Antalya, Turkey |
| EET (UTC+2) | Talal; Radeljić | Report | Goal |

| 4 February 2023 | Nordsjælland (Denmark) | 1–1 | (Moldova) Sheriff Tiraspol | Antalya, Turkey |
| 16:00 EET (UTC+2) | Nygren 17'; (yellow card) (yellow-red card) 90+1' | Report | Atiemwen 20'; (red card) 82' |

| 8 February 2023 | Kryvbas Kryvyi Rih (Ukraine) | 2–1 | (Moldova) Sheriff Tiraspol | Antalya, Turkey |
| 14:00 EET (UTC+2) | Zaderaka 30'; Khomchenovskyi 40' | Report | Badolo 69' |

== Competitions ==
=== Overall record ===
| Competition | First match | Last match | Starting round | Final position | Record | | | | | | | |
| Competition | First match | Last match | Starting round | Final position | Pld | W | D | L | GF | GA | GD | Win % |
|---|---|---|---|---|---|---|---|---|---|---|---|---|
| National Division | 30 July 2022 | 20 May 2023 | Matchday 1 | Winners | 24 | 17 | 6 | 1 | 39 | 9 | +30 | 70.83 |
| Moldovan Cup | 19 October 2022 | 28 May 2023 | Round of 16 | Winners | 6 | 5 | 1 | 0 | 15 | 1 | +14 | 83.33 |
| UEFA Champions League | 6 July 2022 | 9 August 2022 | First qualifying round | Third qualifying round | 6 | 2 | 2 | 2 | 4 | 4 | +0 | 33.33 |
| UEFA Europa League | 18 August 2022 | 3 November 2022 | Play-off round | Group stage | 8 | 2 | 2 | 4 | 4 | 10 | −6 | 25.00 |
| UEFA Europa Conference League | 16 February 2023 | 16 March 2023 | Play-Knockout round play-off | Last 16 | 4 | 1 | 0 | 3 | 4 | 6 | −2 | 25.00 |
| Total | | | | | 48 | 27 | 11 | 10 | 66 | 30 | +36 | 56.25 |

Last updated: 28 May 2023
Source: Competitions

=== Super Liga ===
==== Phase I ====
===== League table =====
| Pos | Team | Pld | W | D | L | GF | GA | GD | Pts | Qualification or relegation |
|---|---|---|---|---|---|---|---|---|---|---|
| 1 | Sheriff Tiraspol | 14 | 10 | 3 | 1 | 24 | 6 | +18 | 33 | Qualification to Phase II |
| 2 | Petrocub Hîncești | 14 | 8 | 3 | 3 | 20 | 11 | +9 | 27 | Qualification to Phase II |
| 3 | Zimbru Chișinău | 14 | 4 | 7 | 3 | 17 | 17 | 0 | 19 (Note: Head-to-head points: Zimbru : 4, Sfîntul Gheorghe : 1.) | Qualification to Phase II |
| 4 | Sfîntul Gheorghe | 14 | 6 | 1 | 7 | 18 | 22 | −4 | 19 | Qualification to Phase II |
| 5 | Milsami Orhei | 14 | 4 | 5 | 5 | 12 | 14 | −2 | 17 (Note: Head-to-head points: Milsami : 4, Bălți : 1.) | Qualification to Phase II |

Source: FMF, UEFA, Soccerway
Rules for classification: 1) Points; 2) Head-to-head points; 3) Head-to-head goal difference; 4) Head-to-head away goals scored; 5) Head-to-head goals scored; 6) Matches won; 7) Goal difference; 8) Goals scored; 9) Least red cards; 10) Least yellow cards.

===== Results summary =====
| Overall | | | | | | | | Home | | | | | | Away | | | | | |
| Pld | W | D | L | GF | GA | GD | Pts | W | D | L | GF | GA | GD | W | D | L | GF | GA | GD |
|---|---|---|---|---|---|---|---|---|---|---|---|---|---|---|---|---|---|---|---|
| 14 | 10 | 3 | 1 | 24 | 6 | +18 | 33 | 5 | 2 | 0 | 12 | 3 | +9 | 5 | 1 | 1 | 12 | 3 | +9 |

Last updated: 9 November 2022.
Source: FMF

===== Results =====
| 30 July 2022 1 | Zimbru Chișinău | 1–1 | Sheriff Tiraspol | Chișinău |
| 20:00 EEST (UTC+3) | Sidorenco 66' | Report | Mudasiru (yellow card) 58'; Julien 63' | Stadium: Zimbru Stadium; Attendance: 2,143; Referee: Andrei Cojocari |

| 6 August 2022 2 | Sfîntul Gheorghe | 1–3 | Sheriff Tiraspol | Suruceni |
| 18:00 EEST (UTC+3) | Ibrahim 4'; Ojog (yellow card) 55'; Ihekuna (yellow card) 70'; Borș (yellow card) 72'; Svinarenco (yellow card) 79'; Paireli (yellow card) 79'; Pușcaș (yellow card) 90+1' | Report | Kiki 23'; Akanbi 32'; Mudasiru (yellow card) 51'; Ambri 81' (pen.); Heron (yellow card) 90' | Stadium: Zimbru-2 Stadium; Attendance: 2,000; Referee: Roman Jitari |

| 14 August 2022 3 | Sheriff Tiraspol | 2–0 | Dinamo-Auto Tiraspol | Tiraspol |
| 18:00 EEST (UTC+3) | Atiemwen (yellow card) 31' (goal) 45+1'; Kiki (yellow card) 86'; Ouattara 90+3' | Report | Mbourou (yellow card) 90+2'; Bekale (yellow card) 90+5' | Stadium: Sheriff Stadium; Attendance: 800; Referee: Ion Orlic |

| 21 August 2022 4 | Bălți | 0–3 | Sheriff Tiraspol | Bălți |
| 20:00 EEST (UTC+3) | Rusnac (yellow card) 6'; Bely (yellow card) 31' | Report | Ambri (yellow card) 6' (goal) 25'; Tejan 75'; Kyabou (yellow card) 79'; Botos 90+3' | Stadium: Stadionul Orășenesc; Attendance: 5,000; Referee: Gabriel Tupicico |

| 29 August 2022 5 | Sheriff Tiraspol | 1–1 | Petrocub Hîncești | Tiraspol |
| 20:00 EEST (UTC+3) | Ambri 36'; Moumouni (yellow card) 59' | Report | Sandu 2'; Jardan (yellow card) 14'; Bogaciuc (yellow card) 38'; Revenco (yellow card) 39'; Mostovei (yellow card) 83'; Bânzaru (yellow card) 90+7' | Stadium: Sheriff Stadium; Attendance: 800; Referee: Veaceslav Banari |

| 3 September 2022 6 | Dacia Buiucani | 0–2 | Sheriff Tiraspol | Chișinău |
| 17:00 EEST (UTC+3) | Demian (yellow card) 61'; Zasavițchi (yellow card) 90+1' | Report | Akanbi 27'; Diop 53'; Kiki (yellow card) 85'; Kyabou (yellow card) 85' | Stadium: Suruceni Stadium; Attendance: 219; Referee: Patru Stoianov |

| 11 September 2022 7 | Sheriff Tiraspol | 2–0 | Milsami Orhei | Tiraspol |
| 19:00 EEST (UTC+3) | Pernambuco 6'; Lushkja (yellow card) 77'; Atiemwen 83' | Report | | Stadium: Sheriff Stadium; Attendance: 747; Referee: Daniel Luca |

| 18 September 2022 8 | Sheriff Tiraspol | 0–0 | Zimbru Chișinău | Tiraspol |
| 19:00 EEST (UTC+3) | Zohouri (yellow card) 56' | Report | Burghiu (yellow card) 45'; Rubanguka (yellow card) 50'; Mihaliov (yellow card) 87' | Stadium: Sheriff Stadium; Attendance: 765; Referee: Ion Tudos |

| 2 October 2022 9 | Sheriff Tiraspol | 3–0 | Sfîntul Gheorghe | Tiraspol |
| 18:00 EEST (UTC+3) | Atiemwen (yellow card) 50'; Diop (yellow card) 52'; Vizeu 55', 79'; Akanbi 72' | Report | Cojocari (yellow card) 51' | Stadium: Sheriff Stadium; Attendance: 650; Referee: Igor Boșca |

| 9 October 2022 10 | Dinamo-Auto Tiraspol | 0–1 | Sheriff Tiraspol | Tîrnauca |
| 15:00 EEST (UTC+3) | Mboula (yellow card) 37'; Mbourou (yellow card) 51'; Karimov (yellow card) 55'; Sipi (yellow card) 62' | Report | Ouattara 25'; Akanbi (yellow card) 37' | Stadium: Dinamo-Auto Stadium; Attendance: 200; Referee: Andrei Breguța |

| 16 October 2022 11 | Sheriff Tiraspol | 2–1 | Bălți | Tiraspol |
| 19:00 EEST (UTC+3) | Akanbi 26'; Diop (yellow card) 38'; Pernambuco (yellow card) 48'; Kiki 80' | Report | Furtună (yellow card) 50'; Miscov (yellow card) 69'; Randriambololona 90+1'; Chelari (yellow card) 90+2' | Stadium: Sheriff Stadium; Attendance: 354; Referee: Ion Bîlea |

| 23 October 2022 12 | Petrocub Hîncești | 1–0 | Sheriff Tiraspol | Hîncești |
| 17:00 EEST (UTC+3) | Ambros 45+1'; Plătică (yellow card) 46'; Mudrac (yellow card) 57'; Avram (yellow card) 89' | Report | | Stadium: Stadionul Municipal; Attendance: 1,400; Referee: Daniel Luca |

| 30 October 2022 13 | Sheriff Tiraspol | 2–1 | Dacia Buiucani | Tiraspol |
| 17:00 EET (UTC+2) | Zohouri (yellow card) 31'; Mudasiru (yellow card) 25'; Akanbi 49'; Ambri 57'; Badolo (yellow card) 70'; Julien (yellow card) 89'; Koval (yellow card) FT | Report | Namolovan (yellow card) 25'; Demian (yellow card) 47'; Dosca 90'; Zasavițchi (yellow card) 90+1'; Efros (yellow card) 90+2'; Focșa (yellow card) 90+5'; Martin (yellow card) FT | Stadium: Sheriff Stadium; Attendance: 445; Referee: Veaceslav Banari |

| 9 November 2022 14 | Milsami Orhei | 0–2 | Sheriff Tiraspol | Orhei |
| 13:00 EET (UTC+2) | | Report | Akanbi 37'; Atiemwen 49'; Kiki (yellow card) 81' | Stadium: CSR Orhei; Attendance: 500; Referee: Roman Jitari |

==== Phase II ====
===== League table =====
| Pos | Team | Pld | W | D | L | GF | GA | GD | Pts | Qualification |
|---|---|---|---|---|---|---|---|---|---|---|
| 1 | Sheriff Tiraspol (C) | 10 | 7 | 3 | 0 | 15 | 3 | +12 | 24 | Qualification for the Champions League first qualifying round |
| 2 | Petrocub Hîncești | 10 | 6 | 3 | 1 | 16 | 6 | +10 | 21 | Qualification for the Europa Conference League second qualifying round |
| 3 | Zimbru Chișinău | 10 | 3 | 3 | 4 | 10 | 9 | +1 | 12 | Qualification for the Europa Conference League first qualifying round |
| 4 | Milsami Orhei | 10 | 3 | 2 | 5 | 10 | 16 | −6 | 11 | Qualification for the Europa Conference League first qualifying round |
| 5 | Sfîntul Gheorghe | 10 | 1 | 4 | 5 | 4 | 13 | −9 | 7 | Dissolved after the season (Note: Sfîntul Gheorghe withdrew before the start of the next season.) |

Source: FMF, UEFA, Soccerway
Rules for classification: 1) Points; 2) Play-off (only if deciding champion when two teams tied); 3) Head-to-head points; 4) Head-to-head goal difference; 5) Head-to-head away goals scored; 6) Head-to-head goals scored; 7) Matches won; 8) Goal difference; 9) Goals scored; 10) Least red cards; 11) Least yellow cards.
(C) Champions

===== Results summary =====
| Overall | | | | | | | | Home | | | | | | Away | | | | | |
| Pld | W | D | L | GF | GA | GD | Pts | W | D | L | GF | GA | GD | W | D | L | GF | GA | GD |
|---|---|---|---|---|---|---|---|---|---|---|---|---|---|---|---|---|---|---|---|
| 10 | 7 | 3 | 0 | 15 | 3 | +12 | 24 | 5 | 2 | 0 | 10 | 2 | +8 | 2 | 1 | 0 | 5 | 1 | +4 |

Last updated: 20 May 2023.
Source: FMF

===== Results =====
| 13 March 2023 15 | Sheriff Tiraspol | 1–0 | Bălți | Tiraspol |
| 16:00 EET (UTC+2) | Tambedou (yellow card) 32'; Diop 51'; Radeljić (yellow card) 76'; Kyabou (yellow card) 87' | Report | Yakovlev (yellow card) 60'; Nwautobo (yellow card) 76' | Stadium: Sheriff Stadium; Attendance: 300; Referee: Andrei Breguța |

| 19 March 2023 16 | Sheriff Tiraspol | 1–0 | Petrocub Hîncești | Tiraspol |
| 16:00 EET (UTC+2) | Radeljić 7'; Akanbi (yellow card) 35'; Tapsoba (yellow card) 45'; Diop (yellow card) 70'; Bekale (yellow card) 78' | Report | Rozgoniuc (yellow card) 35'; Jardan (yellow card) 38'; Avram (yellow card) 45'; Revenco (yellow card) 90+2' | Stadium: Sheriff Stadium; Attendance: 600; Referee: Igor Boșca |

| 1 April 2023 17 | Zimbru Chișinău | 0–2 | Sheriff Tiraspol | Chișinău |
| 16:00 EEST (UTC+3) | Macrițchii (yellow card) 9' | Report | Tapsoba 42' (yellow card) 65'; Kiki 50' | Stadium: Zimbru Stadium; Attendance: 4,173; Referee: Gabriel Tupicica |

| 9 April 2023 18 | Sheriff Tiraspol | 1–0 | Sfîntul Gheorghe | Tiraspol |
| 16:00 EEST (UTC+3) | Akanbi 44'; Moumouni (yellow card) 87'; Tapsoba (yellow card) 89' | Report | Ngah (yellow card) 45'; Cojocari (yellow card) 64' | Stadium: Sheriff Stadium; Attendance: 483; Referee: Roman Jitari |

| 15 April 2023 19 | Sheriff Tiraspol | 2–1 | Milsami Orhei | Tiraspol |
| 18:00 EEST (UTC+3) | Zohouri 36'; Ismaila 79' (yellow card) 88' | Report | Pîslă 42'; Spătaru (yellow card) 73'; Graur (yellow card) 81'; Bolohan (yellow card) FT | Stadium: Sheriff Stadium; Attendance: 373; Referee: Ion Orlic |

| 22 April 2023 20 | Sheriff Tiraspol | 1–1 | Bălți | Tiraspol |
| 18:00 EEST (UTC+3) | Akanbi 25'; Diop (yellow card) 52' | Report | Bely 79'; Randriambololona (yellow card) 52' | Stadium: Sheriff Stadium; Attendance: 550; Referee: Andrei Ceban |

| 30 April 2023 21 | Petrocub Hîncești | 1–1 | Sheriff Tiraspol | Hîncești |
| 18:00 EEST (UTC+3) | Mudrac 2'; Revenco (yellow card) 74'; Cojocaru (yellow card) 89' | Report | Kyabou (yellow card) 43'; Radeljić (yellow card) 74'; Ismaila 90+4' | Stadium: Stadionul Municipal; Attendance: 1,180; Referee: Daniel Luca |

| 6 May 2023 22 | Sheriff Tiraspol | 0–0 | Zimbru Chișinău | Tiraspol |
| 19:00 EEST (UTC+3) | | Report | Răileanu (yellow card) 51'; Sidorenco (yellow card) 61'; Bejan (yellow card) 69' | Stadium: Sheriff Stadium; Attendance: 1,020; Referee: Veaceslav Banari |

| 14 May 2023 23 | Sfîntul Gheorghe | 0–2 | Sheriff Tiraspol | Suruceni |
| 17:00 EEST (UTC+3) | Borș (red card) 76'; Gutu (yellow card) 80' | Report | Diop 2'; Zohouri (yellow card) 38'; Badolo 45'; Tapsoba (yellow card) 67' | Stadium: Zimbru-2 Stadium; Attendance: 300; Referee: Andrei Breguța |

| 20 May 2023 24 | Sheriff Tiraspol | 4–0 | Milsami Orhei | Tiraspol |
| 19:00 EEST (UTC+3) | Talal 20'; Diop 31'; Tapsoba 45'; Tambedou 64'; Guedes (yellow card) 82' | Report | Graur (yellow card) 20'; Lambarschi (yellow card) 57' | Stadium: Sheriff Stadium; Attendance: 3,900; Referee: Roman Jitari |

=== Moldovan Cup ===
| 19 October 2022 Round of 16 | Speranța Drochia | 0–6 | Sheriff Tiraspol | Drochia |
| 13:00 EEST (UTC+3) | Onyeka (yellow card) 23'; Trofan (yellow card) 29'; Gavrilita (yellow card) 65' | Report | Ankudinov 9'; Botos 18', 40'; Ambri 26'; Hatman 54'; Ignatov 66'; Tejan (yellow card) 74' | Stadium: Drochia Stadium; Attendance: 4,500; Referee: Tomas Stjepan |

| 4 March 2023 Quarterfinal 1st leg | Dacia Buiucani | 0–3 | Sheriff Tiraspol | Suruceni |
| 14:00 EET (UTC+2) | Demian (yellow card) 10'; Bivol (yellow card) 86' | Report | López 41', 45'; Ismaila 69'; Garananga (yellow card) 90+1' | Stadium: Suruceni Stadium; Attendance: 465; Referee: Ion Orlic |

| 5 April 2023 Quarterfinal 2nd leg | Sheriff Tiraspol | 3–1 (6–1 agg.) | Dacia Buiucani | Tiraspol |
| 17:00 EEST (UTC+3) | Ismaila 25'; Akanbi 54'; López 90+1' | Report | Dumbrava 63' | Stadium: Sheriff Stadium; Attendance: 175; Referee: Ion Bîlea |

| 26 April 2023 Semifinal 1st leg | Sheriff Tiraspol | 2–0 | Petrocub Hîncești | Tiraspol |
| EEST (UTC+3) | Kyabou (yellow card) 21'; Tapsoba 26'; Ismaila 71' | Report | Cojocaru (yellow card) 42'; Rozgoniuc (yellow card) 49'; Ambros (yellow card) 73'; Lungu (yellow card) 77'; Plătică (yellow card) 84' | Stadium: Malaya Sportivnaya Arena; Attendance: 520; Referee: Gabriel Tupicica |

| 3 May 2023 Semifinal 2nd leg | Petrocub Hîncești | 0–1 (0–3 agg.) | Sheriff Tiraspol | Hîncești |
| EEST (UTC+3) | Bogaciuc (yellow card) 26'; Mudrac (yellow card) 69'; Lungu (yellow card) 73' | Report | Zohouri (yellow card) 39'; Tapsoba 47'; Ismaila (yellow card) 69' | Stadium: Hîncești Stadium; Attendance: 1,080; Referee: Piotr Stoianov |

| 28 May 2023 Final | Bălți | 0–0 (6–7 p) | Sheriff Tiraspol | Hîncești |
| 20:00 EEST (UTC+3) | Moțpan (yellow card) 53'; Rusnac (yellow card) 101'; Mbourou (yellow card) 120' | Report | Tapsoba (yellow card) 58'; Zohouri (yellow card) 59'; Diop (yellow card) 114' | Stadium: Stadionul Municipal; Attendance: 1,185; Referee: Piotr Stoianov |
| | Penalties |
| | Neagu (penalty scored); Moțpan (penalty scored); Rusnac (penalty scored); Furtună (penalty scored); Randriambololona (penalty missed); Cojocari (penalty scored); Yakovlev (penalty scored); Welington (penalty missed) | | (penalty missed) Badolo; (penalty scored) Atiemwen; (penalty scored) Guedes; (penalty scored) Kiki; (penalty scored) Tambedou; (penalty scored) López; (penalty scored) Radeljić; (penalty scored) Diop |

=== UEFA Champions League ===
==== First qualifying round ====
| 6 July 2022 1st leg | Zrinjski (Bosnia and Herzegovina) | 0–0 | (Moldova) Sheriff Tiraspol | Mostar, Bosnia and Herzegovina |
| 20:00 EEST (UTC+3) | Savić (yellow card) 14'; Sučić (yellow card) 36'; Čondrić (yellow card) 60'; Mandić (yellow card) 90+8' | Report | Yansané (yellow card) 50'; Ouattara (yellow card) 60'; Radeljić (yellow card) 69'; Kyabou (yellow card) 87' | Stadium: Stadion pod Bijelim Brijegom; Attendance: 5,400; Referee: Fabio Maresca (Italy) |

| 12 July 2022 2nd | Sheriff Tiraspol (Moldova) | 1–0 (1–0 agg.) | (Bosnia and Herzegovina) Zrinjski | Chișinău, Moldova |
| 20:00 EEST (UTC+3) | Savić 22' (o.g.); Lushkja (yellow card) 62'; Guedes (yellow card) 90+5' | Report | Zlomislić (yellow card) 28'; Janković (yellow card) 74' | Stadium: Zimbru Stadium; Attendance: 4,242; Referee: Radu Petrescu (Romania) |
Note: Sheriff Tiraspol played their home match at the Zimbru Stadium in Chișinău, instead of their regular stadium, the Sheriff Stadium, in Tiraspol, due to Transnistria's involvement in the Russian invasion of Ukraine.

==== Second qualifying round ====
| 20 July 2022 1st leg | Maribor (Slovenia) | 0–0 | (Moldova) Sheriff Tiraspol | Maribor, Slovenia |
| 20:15 EEST (UTC+3) | Mitrović (yellow card) 51'; Sikošek (yellow card) 87' | Report | Radeljić (yellow card) 33' | Stadium: Ljudski vrt Attendance: 7,150; Referee: Harald Lechner (Austria) |

| 26 July 2022 2nd leg | Sheriff Tiraspol (Moldova) | 1–0 (1–0 agg.) | (Slovenia) Maribor | Chișinău, Moldova |
| 20:00 EEST (UTC+3) | Lushkja (yellow card) 56'; Yansané 88' | Report | Karič (yellow card) 56'; Sirk (yellow card) 72'; Sikošek (yellow card) 89' | Stadium: Zimbru Stadium; Attendance: 6,738; Referee: Tamás Bognár (Hungary) |
Note: Sheriff Tiraspol played their home match at the Zimbru Stadium in Chișinău, instead of their regular stadium, the Sheriff Stadium, in Tiraspol, due to Transnistria's involvement in the Russian invasion of Ukraine.

==== Third qualifying round ====
| 2 August 2022 1st leg | Sheriff Tiraspol (Moldova) | 1–2 | (Czech Republic) Viktoria Plzeň | Chișinău, Moldova |
| 20:00 EEST (UTC+3) | Kpozo (yellow card) 10'; Kiki (yellow card) 28'; Abalora (yellow card) 31'; Akanbi 36' (pen.) (yellow card) 79' | Report | Kalvach (yellow card) 22'; Chorý 41' (pen.); Hejda (yellow card) 50'; Bucha 55'; Kopic (yellow card) 78' | Stadium: Zimbru Stadium; Attendance: 8,153; Referee: Danny Makkelie (Netherlands) |
Note: Sheriff Tiraspol played their home match at the Zimbru Stadium in Chișinău, instead of their regular stadium, the Sheriff Stadium, in Tiraspol, due to Transnistria's involvement in the Russian invasion of Ukraine.

| 9 August 2022 2nd leg | Viktoria Plzeň (Czech Republic) | 2–1 (4–2 agg.) | (Moldova) Sheriff Tiraspol | Plzeň, Czech Republic |
| 20:00 EEST (UTC+3) | Kliment 10'; Chorý (penalty missed) 27'; Havel (yellow card) 46'; Mosquera 62'; Dedič (yellow card) 90+4' | Report | Pernambuco (yellow card) 17'; Evangelou (yellow card) 26' (yellow-red card) 85'; Akanbi 47' (pen.); Tejan (yellow card) 90+4' | Stadium: Doosan Arena; Attendance: 10,770; Referee: Orel Grinfeld (Israel) |

=== UEFA Europa League ===
==== Play-off round ====
| 18 August 2022 1st leg | Pyunik (Armenia) | 0–0 | (Moldova) Sheriff Tiraspol | Yerevan, Armenia |
| 20:00 EEST (UTC+3) | Bratkov (yellow card) 50' | Report | Guedes (yellow card) 30' | Stadium: Vazgen Sargsyan Republican Stadium; Attendance: 9,000; Referee: Alejandro Hernández Hernández (Spain) |

| 25 August 2022 2nd leg | Sheriff Tiraspol (Moldova) | 0–0 (0–0 agg.) (3–2 p) | (Armenia) Pyunik | Chișinău, Moldova |
| 20:00 EEST (UTC+3) | Ouattara (yellow card) 55'; Botos (yellow card) 96'; Diop (yellow card) 119' | Report | Vakulenko (yellow card) 85'; Gareginyan (yellow card) 95' | Stadium: Zimbru Stadium; Attendance: 6,154; Referee: Andreas Ekberg (Sweden) |
| | Penalties |
| | Tejan (penalty scored); Ambri (penalty missed); Diop (penalty missed); Kpozo (penalty scored); Kiki (penalty missed); Radeljić (penalty scored) | | (penalty missed) Harutyunyan; (penalty missed) Dashyan; (penalty missed) Zambrano; (penalty scored) Gareginyan; (penalty scored) Vakulenko; (penalty missed) Kovalenko |
Note: Sheriff Tiraspol played their home match at the Zimbru Stadium in Chișinău, instead of their regular stadium, the Sheriff Stadium, in Tiraspol, due to Transnistria's involvement in the Russian invasion of Ukraine.

==== Group stage ====
| Pos | Team | Pld | W | D | L | GF | GA | GD | Pts | Qualification |
|---|---|---|---|---|---|---|---|---|---|---|
| 1 | (Spain) Real Sociedad | 6 | 5 | 0 | 1 | 10 | 2 | +8 | 15 (Note: Tied on head-to-head results. Overall goal difference is used as the tiebreaker.) | Advance to round of 16 |
| 2 | (England) Manchester United | 6 | 5 | 0 | 1 | 10 | 3 | +7 | 15 | Advance to knockout round play-offs |
| 3 | (Moldova) Sheriff Tiraspol | 6 | 2 | 0 | 4 | 4 | 10 | −6 | 6 | Transfer to Europa Conference League |
| 4 | (Cyprus) Omonia | 6 | 0 | 0 | 6 | 3 | 12 | −9 | 0 | |

Source: UEFA
Rules for classification: Group stage tiebreakers
Notes:

| 8 September 2022 1 | Omonia (Cyprus) | 0–3 | (Moldova) Sheriff Tiraspol | Nicosia, Cyprus |
| 22:00 EEST (UTC+3) | Lang (yellow card) 54'; Bezus (yellow card) 85' | Report | Akanbi 2' (yellow card) 8'; Atiemwen 55' (pen.) (yellow card) 56'; Diop 76'; Mudasiru (yellow card) 89'; Kpozo (yellow card) 90+7' | Stadium: GSP Stadium; Attendance: 11,271; Referee: Rade Obrenović (Slovenia) |

| 15 September 2022 2 | Sheriff Tiraspol (Moldova) | 0–2 | (England) Manchester United | Chișinău, Moldova |
| 19:45 EEST (UTC+3) | Kpozo (yellow card) 38'; Atiemwen (yellow card) 63' | Report | Sancho 17'; Ronaldo 39' (pen.) | Stadium: Zimbru Stadium; Attendance: 8,734; Referee: Paweł Raczkowski (Poland) |
Note: Sheriff Tiraspol played their home match at the Zimbru Stadium in Chișinău, instead of their regular stadium, the Sheriff Stadium, in Tiraspol, due to Transnistria's involvement in the Russian invasion of Ukraine.

| 6 October 2022 3 | Sheriff Tiraspol (Moldova) | 0–2 | (Spain) Real Sociedad | Chișinău, Moldova |
| 19:45 EEST (UTC+3) | Kyabou (yellow card) 17' (yellow-red card) 61'; Atiemwen (yellow card) 31' | Report | Sola (yellow card) 29'; Silva 53'; Elustondo 62' | Stadium: Zimbru Stadium; Attendance: 5,427; Referee: Harald Lechner (Austria) |
Note: Sheriff Tiraspol played their home match at the Zimbru Stadium in Chișinău, instead of their regular stadium, the Sheriff Stadium, in Tiraspol, due to Transnistria's involvement in the Russian invasion of Ukraine.

| 13 October 2022 4 | Real Sociedad (Spain) | 3–0 | (Moldova) Sheriff Tiraspol | San Sebastián, Spain |
| 22:00 EEST (UTC+3) | Rico (yellow card) 37' (goal) 66'; Sørloth 45+1'; Navarro 81' | Report | Mudasiru (yellow card) 14'; Zohouri (yellow card) 25' (yellow-red card) 33' | Stadium: Anoeta; Attendance: 25,806; Referee: Enea Jorgji (Albania) |

| 27 October 2022 5 | Manchester United (England) | 3–0 | (Moldova) Sheriff Tiraspol | Manchester, England |
| 22:00 EEST (UTC+3) | Dalot 44'; Rashford 65'; Ronaldo 81'; Maguire (yellow card) 84' | Report | Akanbi (yellow card) 22'; Guedes (yellow card) 64' | Stadium: Old Trafford; Attendance: 73,764; Referee: Anastasios Sidiropoulos (Greece) |

| 3 November 2022 6 | Sheriff Tiraspol (Moldova) | 1–0 | (Cyprus) Omonia | Chișinău, Moldova |
| 19:45 EET (UTC+2) | Radeljić (yellow card) 17'; Rasheed (yellow card) 68' (goal) 88' | Report | Bezus (yellow card) 81' | Stadium: Zimbru Stadium; Attendance: 2,295; Referee: Fran Jović (Croatia) |
Note: Sheriff Tiraspol played their home match at the Zimbru Stadium in Chișinău, instead of their regular stadium, the Sheriff Stadium, in Tiraspol, due to Transnistria's involvement in the Russian invasion of Ukraine.

=== UEFA Europa Conference League ===
==== Knockout phase ====
| 16 February 2023 Knockout round play-off First leg | Sheriff Tiraspol (Moldova) | 0–1 | (Serbia) Partizan | Chișinău, Moldova |
| 22:00 EET (UTC+2) | Tapsoba (yellow card) 45+2'; Moumouni (yellow card) 90+7' | Report | Belić (yellow card) 36'; Gomes 45'; Vujačić (red card) 50'; Popović (yellow card) 72' | Stadium: Zimbru Stadium; Attendance: 0 Referee: Harm Osmers (Germany) |
Note: Sheriff Tiraspol played their home match at the Zimbru Stadium in Chișinău, instead of their regular stadium, the Sheriff Stadium, in Tiraspol, due to Transnistria's involvement in the Russian invasion of Ukraine. Match played behind closed doors.

| 23 February 2023 Knockout round play-off Second leg | Partizan (Serbia) | 1–3 (2–3 agg.) | (Moldova) Sheriff Tiraspol | Belgrade, Serbia |
| 19:45 EET (UTC+2) | Menig 13'; Baždar (yellow card) 88' | Report | Badolo 22' (pen.); Radeljić (yellow card) 28'; Diop 45+1', 47'; Kyabou (yellow card) 68' | Stadium: Partizan Stadium; Attendance: 8,575; Referee: Andreas Ekberg (Sweden) |

| 9 March 2023 Round of 16 First leg | Sheriff Tiraspol (Moldova) | 0–1 | (France) Nice | Chișinău, Moldova |
| 19:45 EET (UTC+2) | Kpozo (yellow card) 12'; Akanbi (yellow card) 62'; Zohouri (yellow card) 87' | Report | Dante (yellow card) 44'; Amraoui 45+3'; Thuram (yellow card) 64'; Rosario (yellow card) 73' | Stadium: Zimbru Stadium; Attendance: 5,326; Referee: Aliyar Aghayev (Azerbaijan) |

| 16 March 2023 Round of 16 Second leg | Nice (France) | 3–1 (4–1 agg.) | (Moldova) Sheriff Tiraspol | Nice, France |
| 22:00 EET (UTC+2) | Laborde 30'; Moffi 53'; Brahimi 79' | Report | Tapsoba 54' | Stadium: Allianz Riviera; Attendance: 23,070; Referee: Lawrence Visser (Belgium) |

== Squad statistics ==
As of match played 28 May 2023

=== Appearances and goals ===
| No. | Pos | Nat | Player | Total | | Super Liga | | Moldovan Cup | | Champions League | | Europa League | | Europa Conference League | |
| No. | Pos | Nat | Player | Apps | Goals | Apps | Goals | Apps | Goals | Apps | Goals | Apps | Goals | Apps | Goals |
|---|---|---|---|---|---|---|---|---|---|---|---|---|---|---|---|
| 1 | GK | (Moldova) MDA | Dumitru Celeadnic | 12 | 0 | 9 | 0 | 0 | 0 | 0 | 0 | 3 | 0 | 0 | 0 |
| 2 | MF | (Ghana) GHA | Patrick Kpozo | 36 | 0 | 13+2 | 0 | 3+1 | 0 | 6 | 0 | 7+1 | 0 | 3 | 0 |
| 4 | DF | (Zimbabwe) ZIM | Munashe Garananga | 14 | 0 | 3+2 | 0 | 4+1 | 0 | 0 | 0 | 0 | 0 | 3+1 | 0 |
| 6 | DF | (Bosnia and Herzegovina) BIH | Stjepan Radeljić | 38 | 1 | 16+2 | 1 | 3+1 | 0 | 5 | 0 | 7 | 0 | 3+1 | 0 |
| 7 | FW | (Burkina Faso) BFA | Abou Ouattara | 20 | 2 | 5+4 | 2 | 0 | 0 | 3+3 | 0 | 4+1 | 0 | 0 | 0 |
| 8 | MF | (Senegal) SEN | Mouhamed Diop | 35 | 6 | 17+3 | 3 | 2+1 | 0 | 0 | 0 | 8 | 1 | 4 | 2 |
| 9 | FW | (Argentina) ARG | Michael López | 9 | 3 | 3+2 | 0 | 2+2 | 3 | 0 | 0 | 0 | 0 | 0 | 0 |
| 10 | MF | (Burkina Faso) BFA | Cedric Badolo | 40 | 2 | 14+4 | 1 | 3+1 | 0 | 6 | 0 | 8 | 0 | 3+1 | 1 |
| 11 | FW | (Brazil) BRA | Ricardinho | 11 | 0 | 4+3 | 0 | 2+2 | 0 | 0 | 0 | 0 | 0 | 0 | 0 |
| 12 | MF | (Niger) NIG | Abdoul Moumouni | 16 | 0 | 6+3 | 0 | 2+2 | 0 | 0 | 0 | 0 | 0 | 0+3 | 0 |
| 14 | MF | (Morocco) MAR | Amine Talal | 16 | 1 | 8+2 | 1 | 2+1 | 0 | 0 | 0 | 0 | 0 | 2+1 | 0 |
| 15 | DF | (Cameroon) CMR | Gaby Kiki | 40 | 3 | 18+1 | 3 | 2+1 | 0 | 6 | 0 | 8 | 0 | 4 | 0 |
| 18 | MF | (Mali) MLI | Moussa Kyabou | 30 | 0 | 8+2 | 0 | 3 | 0 | 6 | 0 | 7 | 0 | 4 | 0 |
| 19 | FW | (The Gambia) GAM | Bubacarr Tambedou | 11 | 1 | 2+5 | 1 | 2+2 | 0 | 0 | 0 | 0 | 0 | 0 | 0 |
| 20 | DF | (Ivory Coast) CIV | Armel Zohouri | 30 | 1 | 15+2 | 1 | 4 | 0 | 0 | 0 | 5 | 0 | 4 | 0 |
| 22 | MF | (Gabon) GAB | Christ Bekale | 9 | 0 | 0+7 | 0 | 2 | 0 | 0 | 0 | 0 | 0 | 0 | 0 |
| 24 | MF | (Moldova) MDA | Eugeniu Gliga | 6 | 0 | 0 | 0 | 1+2 | 0 | 0 | 0 | 0+1 | 0 | 0+2 | 0 |
| 26 | DF | (Moldova) MDA | Artiom Dijinari | 1 | 0 | 0 | 0 | 0+1 | 0 | 0 | 0 | 0 | 0 | 0 | 0 |
| 27 | MF | (Moldova) MDA | Adrian Hatman | 2 | 1 | 0 | 0 | 1 | 1 | 0 | 0 | 0+1 | 0 | 0 | 0 |
| 29 | DF | (Moldova) MDA | Danila Ignatov | 4 | 1 | 0 | 0 | 3 | 1 | 0 | 0 | 0+1 | 0 | 0 | 0 |
| 30 | FW | (Burkina Faso) BFA | Abdoul Tapsoba | 16 | 5 | 9 | 2 | 3 | 2 | 0 | 0 | 0 | 0 | 4 | 1 |
| 31 | MF | (Moldova) MDA | Nichita Covali | 6 | 0 | 0+1 | 0 | 1+2 | 0 | 0 | 0 | 0+1 | 0 | 0+1 | 0 |
| 35 | GK | (Ukraine) UKR | Maksym Koval | 19 | 0 | 5 | 0 | 5 | 0 | 0 | 0 | 5 | 0 | 4 | 0 |
| 40 | GK | (Ghana) GHA | Razak Abalora | 17 | 0 | 10 | 0 | 1 | 0 | 6 | 0 | 0 | 0 | 0 | 0 |
| 41 | DF | (Greece) GRE | Stefanos Evangelou | 7 | 0 | 4 | 0 | 0 | 0 | 1+2 | 0 | 0 | 0 | 0 | 0 |
| 42 | DF | (Brazil) BRA | Renan Guedes | 33 | 0 | 9+7 | 0 | 2+1 | 0 | 6 | 0 | 4+2 | 0 | 1+1 | 0 |
| 61 | FW | (Nigeria) NGR | Rasheed Akanbi | 38 | 13 | 16+3 | 8 | 2 | 1 | 6 | 2 | 8 | 2 | 2+1 | 0 |
| 80 | FW | (Nigeria) NGR | Iyayi Atiemwen | 26 | 4 | 9+5 | 3 | 0+1 | 0 | 0+1 | 0 | 5+2 | 1 | 3 | 0 |
| 99 | FW | (Nigeria) NGR | Origbaajo Ismaila | 12 | 5 | 3+5 | 2 | 3+1 | 3 | 0 | 0 | 0 | 0 | 0 | 0 |
Players away on loan:
| 19 | MF | (Moldova) MDA | Serafim Cojocari | 2 | 0 | 0+1 | 0 | 0 | 0 | 0+1 | 0 | 0 | 0 | 0 | 0 |
| 23 | FW | (Kazakhstan) KAZ | Danil Ankudinov | 5 | 1 | 0+4 | 0 | 1 | 1 | 0 | 0 | 0 | 0 | 0 | 0 |
| 99 | FW | (Guinea) GUI | Momo Yansané | 5 | 1 | 1 | 0 | 0 | 0 | 3+1 | 1 | 0 | 0 | 0 | 0 |
Players who left Sheriff Tiraspol during the season:
| 3 | DF | (Malawi) MAW | Charles Petro | 7 | 0 | 5+1 | 0 | 1 | 0 | 0 | 0 | 0 | 0 | 0 | 0 |
| 4 | DF | (Brazil) BRA | Heron | 18 | 0 | 9+4 | 0 | 1 | 0 | 0 | 0 | 1+3 | 0 | 0 | 0 |
| 9 | FW | (Netherlands) NED | Kay Tejan | 15 | 1 | 3+5 | 1 | 0+1 | 0 | 2+2 | 0 | 1+1 | 0 | 0 | 0 |
| 11 | FW | (Brazil) BRA | Felipe Vizeu | 10 | 2 | 2+4 | 2 | 0 | 0 | 0 | 0 | 1+3 | 0 | 0 | 0 |
| 16 | DF | (Trinidad and Tobago) TTO | Keston Julien | 16 | 1 | 8+4 | 1 | 2 | 0 | 0+2 | 0 | 0 | 0 | 0 | 0 |
| 17 | MF | (Ghana) GHA | Salifu Mudasiru | 21 | 0 | 11+1 | 0 | 0 | 0 | 1 | 0 | 3+5 | 0 | 0 | 0 |
| 22 | MF | (Albania) ALB | Regi Lushkja | 15 | 0 | 2+7 | 0 | 1 | 0 | 5 | 0 | 0 | 0 | 0 | 0 |
| 28 | FW | (Brazil) BRA | Pernambuco | 22 | 1 | 6+4 | 1 | 0 | 0 | 4+2 | 0 | 3+3 | 0 | 0 | 0 |
| 30 | MF | (Greece) GRE | Giannis Fivos Botos | 11 | 2 | 4+3 | 1 | 1 | 1 | 0+2 | 0 | 0+1 | 0 | 0 | 0 |
| 70 | FW | (Guinea-Bissau) GBS | Steve Ambri | 10 | 5 | 7+1 | 4 | 1 | 1 | 0 | 0 | 0+1 | 0 | 0 | 0 |

=== Goal scorers ===
| Place | Position | Nation | Number | Name | Super Liga | Moldovan Cup | Champions League | Europa League | Europa Conference League | Total |
|---|---|---|---|---|---|---|---|---|---|---|
| 1 | FW | (Nigeria) | 61 | Rasheed Akanbi | 8 | 1 | 2 | 2 | 0 | 13 |
| 2 | MF | (Senegal) | 8 | Mouhamed Diop | 4 | 0 | 0 | 1 | 2 | 7 |
| 3 | FW | (Guinea-Bissau) | 70 | Steve Ambri | 4 | 1 | 0 | 0 | 0 | 5 |
| 3 | FW | (Nigeria) | 99 | Origbaajo Ismaila | 2 | 3 | 0 | 0 | 0 | 5 |
| 3 | FW | (Burkina Faso) | 30 | Abdoul Tapsoba | 2 | 2 | 0 | 0 | 1 | 5 |
| 6 | FW | (Nigeria) | 80 | Iyayi Atiemwen | 3 | 0 | 0 | 1 | 0 | 4 |
| 7 | DF | (Cameroon) | 15 | Gaby Kiki | 3 | 0 | 0 | 0 | 0 | 3 |
| 7 | MF | (Greece) | 30 | Giannis Fivos Botos | 1 | 2 | 0 | 0 | 0 | 3 |
| 7 | FW | (Argentina) | 9 | Michael López | 0 | 3 | 0 | 0 | 0 | 3 |
| 10 | FW | (Brazil) | 11 | Felipe Vizeu | 2 | 0 | 0 | 0 | 0 | 2 |
| 10 | FW | (Burkina Faso) | 7 | Abou Ouattara | 2 | 0 | 0 | 0 | 0 | 2 |
| 10 | MF | (Burkina Faso) | 10 | Cedric Badolo | 1 | 0 | 0 | 0 | 1 | 2 |
| 13 | DF | (Trinidad and Tobago) | 16 | Keston Julien | 1 | 0 | 0 | 0 | 0 | 1 |
| 13 | FW | (Netherlands) | 9 | Kay Tejan | 1 | 0 | 0 | 0 | 0 | 1 |
| 13 | FW | (Brazil) | 28 | Pernambuco | 1 | 0 | 0 | 0 | 0 | 1 |
| 13 | DF | (Bosnia and Herzegovina) | 6 | Stjepan Radeljić | 1 | 0 | 0 | 0 | 0 | 1 |
| 13 | DF | (Ivory Coast) | 20 | Armel Zohouri | 1 | 0 | 0 | 0 | 0 | 1 |
| 13 | MF | (Morocco) | 14 | Amine Talal | 1 | 0 | 0 | 0 | 0 | 1 |
| 13 | FW | (The Gambia) | 19 | Bubacarr Tambedou | 1 | 0 | 0 | 0 | 0 | 1 |
| 13 | FW | (Kazakhstan) | 23 | Danil Ankudinov | 0 | 1 | 0 | 0 | 0 | 1 |
| 13 | MF | (Moldova) | 24 | Adrian Hatman | 0 | 1 | 0 | 0 | 0 | 1 |
| 13 | DF | (Moldova) | 29 | Danila Ignatov | 0 | 1 | 0 | 0 | 0 | 1 |
| 13 | FW | (Guinea) | 99 | Momo Yansané | 0 | 0 | 1 | 0 | 0 | 1 |
| 13 | | | | Own goal | 0 | 0 | 1 | 0 | 0 | 1 |
| | | | | TOTALS | 39 | 15 | 4 | 4 | 4 | 66 |

=== Clean sheets ===
| Place | Position | Nation | Number | Name | Super Liga | Moldovan Cup | Champions League | Europa League | Europa Conference League | Total |
|---|---|---|---|---|---|---|---|---|---|---|
| 1 | GK | (Ghana) | 40 | Razak Abalora | 7 | 1 | 4 | 0 | 0 | 12 |
| 2 | GK | (Ukraine) | 35 | Maksym Koval | 3 | 4 | 0 | 2 | 0 | 9 |
| 3 | GK | (Moldova) | 1 | Dumitru Celeadnic | 5 | 0 | 0 | 2 | 0 | 7 |
| | | | | TOTALS | 15 | 5 | 4 | 4 | 0 | 28 |

=== Disciplinary record ===
| Number | Nation | Position | Name | Super Liga | | Moldovan Cup | | Champions League | | Europa League | | Europa Conference League | | Total | |
| Number | Nation | Position | Name | Booked | Sent off (straight red) | Booked | Sent off (straight red) | Booked | Sent off (straight red) | Booked | Sent off (straight red) | Booked | Sent off (straight red) | Booked | Sent off (straight red) |
| 2 | (Ghana) | MF | Patrick Kpozo | 0 | 0 | 0 | 0 | 1 | 0 | 2 | 0 | 1 | 0 | 4 | 0 |
| 4 | (Zimbabwe) | DF | Munashe Garananga | 0 | 0 | 1 | 0 | 0 | 0 | 0 | 0 | 0 | 0 | 1 | 0 |
| 6 | (Bosnia and Herzegovina) | DF | Stjepan Radeljić | 2 | 0 | 0 | 0 | 2 | 0 | 1 | 0 | 1 | 0 | 6 | 0 |
| 7 | (Burkina Faso) | FW | Abou Ouattara | 0 | 0 | 0 | 0 | 1 | 0 | 1 | 0 | 0 | 0 | 2 | 0 |
| 8 | (Senegal) | MF | Mouhamed Diop | 4 | 0 | 1 | 0 | 0 | 0 | 1 | 0 | 0 | 0 | 6 | 0 |
| 10 | (Burkina Faso) | MF | Cedric Badolo | 1 | 0 | 0 | 0 | 0 | 0 | 0 | 0 | 0 | 0 | 1 | 0 |
| 12 | (Niger) | MF | Abdoul Moumouni | 2 | 0 | 0 | 0 | 0 | 0 | 0 | 0 | 1 | 0 | 3 | 0 |
| 15 | (Cameroon) | DF | Gaby Kiki | 3 | 0 | 0 | 0 | 1 | 0 | 0 | 0 | 0 | 0 | 4 | 0 |
| 18 | (Mali) | MF | Moussa Kyabou | 4 | 0 | 1 | 0 | 1 | 0 | 2 | 1 | 1 | 0 | 9 | 1 |
| 19 | (The Gambia) | FW | Bubacarr Tambedou | 1 | 0 | 0 | 0 | 0 | 0 | 0 | 0 | 0 | 0 | 1 | 0 |
| 20 | (Ivory Coast) | DF | Armel Zohouri | 3 | 0 | 2 | 0 | 0 | 0 | 2 | 1 | 1 | 0 | 8 | 1 |
| 22 | (Gabon) | MF | Christ Bekale | 1 | 0 | 0 | 0 | 0 | 0 | 0 | 0 | 0 | 0 | 1 | 0 |
| 30 | (Burkina Faso) | FW | Abdoul Tapsoba | 4 | 0 | 1 | 0 | 0 | 0 | 0 | 0 | 1 | 0 | 6 | 0 |
| 35 | (Ukraine) | GK | Maksym Koval | 1 | 0 | 0 | 0 | 0 | 0 | 0 | 0 | 0 | 0 | 1 | 0 |
| 40 | (Ghana) | GK | Razak Abalora | 0 | 0 | 0 | 0 | 1 | 0 | 0 | 0 | 0 | 0 | 1 | 0 |
| 41 | (Greece) | DF | Stefanos Evangelou | 0 | 0 | 0 | 0 | 2 | 1 | 0 | 0 | 0 | 0 | 2 | 1 |
| 42 | (Brazil) | DF | Renan Guedes | 1 | 0 | 0 | 0 | 1 | 0 | 2 | 0 | 0 | 0 | 4 | 0 |
| 61 | (Nigeria) | FW | Rasheed Akanbi | 2 | 0 | 0 | 0 | 1 | 0 | 3 | 0 | 1 | 0 | 7 | 0 |
| 80 | (Nigeria) | FW | Iyayi Atiemwen | 2 | 0 | 0 | 0 | 0 | 0 | 3 | 0 | 0 | 0 | 5 | 0 |
| 99 | (Nigeria) | FW | Origbaajo Ismaila | 1 | 0 | 1 | 0 | 0 | 0 | 0 | 0 | 0 | 0 | 2 | 0 |
Players away on loan:
| 99 | (Guinea) | FW | Momo Yansané | 0 | 0 | 0 | 0 | 1 | 0 | 0 | 0 | 0 | 0 | 1 | 0 |
Players who left Sheriff Tiraspol during the season:
| 4 | (Brazil) | DF | Heron | 1 | 0 | 0 | 0 | 0 | 0 | 0 | 0 | 0 | 0 | 1 | 0 |
| 9 | (Netherlands) | FW | Kay Tejan | 0 | 0 | 1 | 0 | 1 | 0 | 0 | 0 | 0 | 0 | 2 | 0 |
| 16 | (Trinidad and Tobago) | DF | Keston Julien | 1 | 0 | 0 | 0 | 0 | 0 | 0 | 0 | 0 | 0 | 1 | 0 |
| 17 | (Ghana) | MF | Salifu Mudasiru | 3 | 0 | 0 | 0 | 0 | 0 | 2 | 0 | 0 | 0 | 5 | 0 |
| 22 | (Albania) | MF | Regi Lushkja | 1 | 0 | 0 | 0 | 2 | 0 | 0 | 0 | 0 | 0 | 3 | 0 |
| 28 | (Brazil) | FW | Pernambuco | 1 | 0 | 0 | 0 | 1 | 0 | 0 | 0 | 0 | 0 | 2 | 0 |
| 30 | (Greece) | MF | Giannis Fivos Botos | 0 | 0 | 0 | 0 | 0 | 0 | 1 | 0 | 0 | 0 | 1 | 0 |
| 70 | (Guinea-Bissau) | FW | Steve Ambri | 1 | 0 | 0 | 0 | 0 | 0 | 0 | 0 | 0 | 0 | 1 | 0 |
| | | | TOTALS | 40 | 0 | 8 | 0 | 16 | 1 | 20 | 2 | 7 | 0 | 91 | 3 |
