= Heron (footballer) =

Brazilian footballer (born 2000)

Personal information
- Full name: Heron Crespo da Silva
- Date of birth: 17 August 2000 (age 26)
- Place of birth: Campos dos Goytacazes, Brazil
- Height: 1.86 m (6 ft 1 in)
- Position: Centre-back

Team information
- Current team: Londrina
- Number: 34

Youth career
- 2016: América-SP
- 2017–2018: Osvaldo Cruz
- 2019: Goiás

Senior career*
Years	Team	Apps	(Gls)
2017–2018	Osvaldo Cruz	12	(0)
2019–2023	Goiás	42	(0)
2021–2022	→ Vejle (loan)	16	(0)
2022	→ Sheriff Tiraspol (loan)	13	(0)
2023–2025	Atlético Goianiense	36	(0)
2024	→ CRB (loan)	10	(0)
2026–	Londrina	32	(0)
- * Club domestic league appearances and goals as of 18 November 2026

Heron Crespo da Silva (born 17 August 2000), simply known as Heron, is a Brazilian footballer who plays as a centre-back for Londrina.

== Club career ==
Born Rio de Janeiro, Heron made his senior debut for Osvaldo Cruz on 30 April 2017, starting in a 3–0 Campeonato Paulista Segunda Divisão home win against Grêmio Prudente; aged 16, he became the youngest player to appear for the club. On 16 February 2018, he moved to Goiás and subsequently returned to the youth setup.

Heron made his first team debut for the Esmeraldino on 14 August 2019, starting in a 0–0 away draw against Brasiliense for the year's Copa Verde. Definitely promoted to the main squad for the 2020 season, he made his Série A debut on 12 August of that year by starting in a 1–2 away loss against Athletico Paranaense.

On 21 August 2021, Heron joined Danish Superliga club Vejle Boldklub on loan. On 21 June 2022, he moved to Sheriff Tiraspol also in a temporary deal.

== Career statistics ==
As of 13 February 2023

Club	Season	League			State League		Cup		Continental		Other		Total	
Club	Season	Division	Apps	Goals	Apps	Goals	Apps	Goals	Apps	Goals	Apps	Goals	Apps	Goals
Osvaldo Cruz	2017	Paulista 2ª Divisão	—		12	0	—		—		—		12	0
Goiás	2019	Série A	0	0	0	0	0	0	—		3 (Note: Appearance(s) in Copa Verde)	0	3	0
Goiás	2020	Série A	24	0	4	0	0	0	1 (Note: Appearance(s) in Copa Sudamericana)	0	—		29	0
Goiás	2021	Série B	1	0	10	0	1	0	—		—		12	0
Goiás	2023	Série A	0	0	2	0	0	0	0	0	—		2	0
Goiás	Total		25	0	16	0	1	0	1	0	3	0	46	0
Vejle (loan)	2021–22	Danish Superliga	16	0	—		4	0	—		—		20	0
Sheriff Tiraspol (loan)	2022–23	Divizia Naţională	13	0	—		1	0	4 (Note: Appearance(s) in UEFA Europa League)	0	—		18	0
Career total			54	0	28	0	6	0	5	0	3	0	96	0
