= Cedric Badolo =

Burkinabé footballer

Cédric Badolo
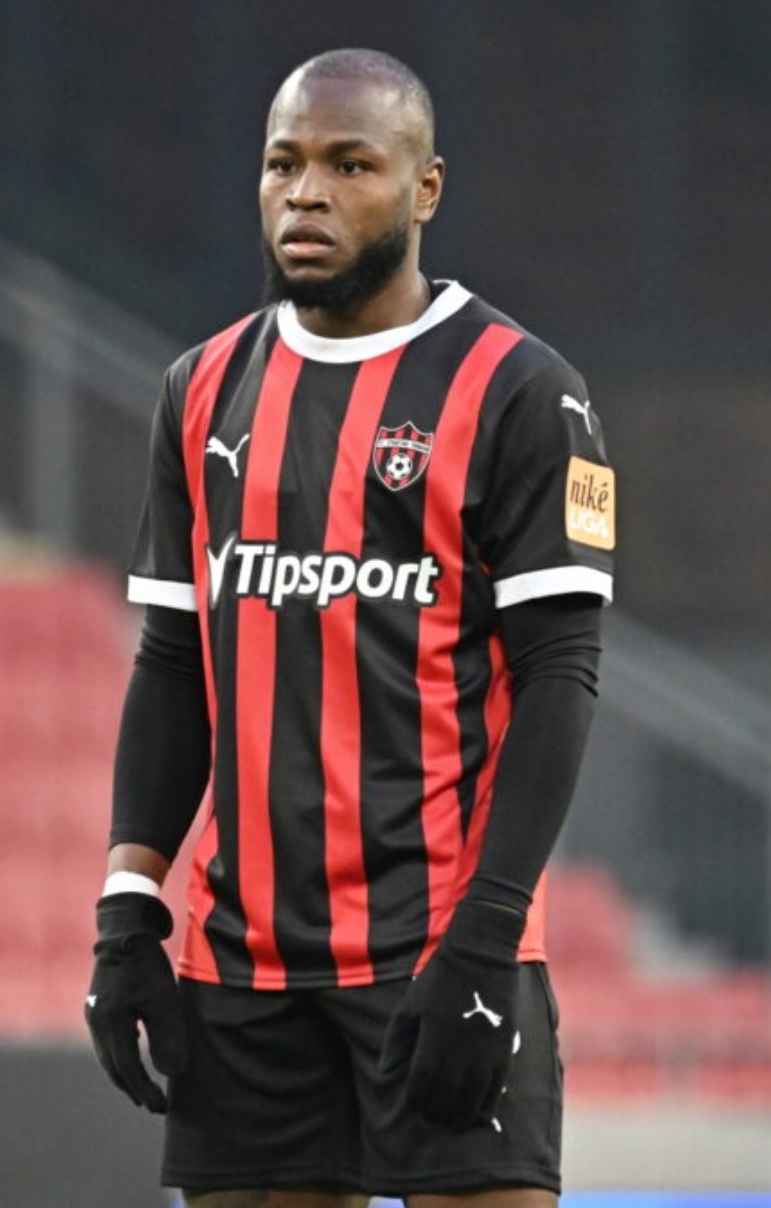
- Badolo with Spartak Trnava

Personal information
- Date of birth: 4 November 1998 (age 28)
- Place of birth: Ouagadougou, Burkina Faso
- Height: 1.78 m (5 ft 10 in)
- Position: Attacking midfielder

Team information
- Current team: Sumgayit
- Number: 6

Youth career
- Salitas

Senior career*
Years	Team	Apps	(Gls)
2015–2016	USFA		
2016–2017	Kawkab Marrakech	2	(0)
2018–2019	Salitas		
2019–2022	Pohronie	58	(3)
2022	→ Sheriff Tiraspol (loan)	19	(2)
2023–2024	Sheriff Tiraspol	39	(10)
2025	Spartak Trnava	13	(0)
2026–	Sumgayit	14	(0)

International career^{‡}
2018	Burkina Faso U23	1	(1)
2022–	Burkina Faso	31	(0)
- * Club domestic league appearances and goals as of 22 June 2026 ‡ National team caps and goals as of 6 January 2026

Cédric Badolo (born 4 November 1998) is a Burkinabé professional footballer who plays for club Sumgayit FK as an attacking midfielder.

== Club career ==
=== FK Pohronie ===
Badolo made his Fortuna Liga debut for Pohronie in the club's premier first division match against Slovan Bratislava on 20 July 2019 at Mestský štadión.

He scored his first goal for Pohronie after a pass from Peter Mazan in a match against iClinic Sereď. Badolo's goal was the winning one of the 2:1 game of Pohronie.

=== Sheriff Tiraspol ===
On 9 February 2022, Sheriff Tiraspol announced the signing of Badolo. On 4 January 2025, Sheriff announced that Badolo had left the club.

=== Spartak Trnava ===
On 28 January 2025, Spartak Trnava announced the signing of Badolo on a contract until the end of the 2026/2027 season. He came to the club with his younger brother Akim Badolo. Badolo made his debut for Spartak on 23 February 2025, in a 1:1 draw at home against Železiarne Podbrezová. He waited 2 months until his first contribution, assisting the winning goal for Miloš Kratochvíl in a 2:1 win over Podbrezová in the last game of the season.

Badolo played his first European game for Spartak in a 1:0 loss at home in the first round of qualification to the Europa League against BK Häcken. He came on as substitute in the 71” minute. He scored a goal from outside of the box, however the goal was disallowed due to an offside in the build up.

== International career ==
Badolo received his first national team nomination from Oscar Barro in March 2022, ahead of friendly fixtures against Kosovo and Belgium. He debuted on 24 March 2022 at Fadil Vokrri Stadium, coming on as a second-half substitute against Kosovo, with the score at 3-0 for the European team. Following his replacement of Bryan Dabo after 63 minutes of play, Badolo witnessed two further goals by Kosovo, through Milot Rashica and Toni Domgjoni within some ten minutes of his arrival, to seal the 5–0 defeat. At home, the result was described as 'sinking' and was partly attributed to forced absences.

Days later, on 29 March 2022, Badolo similarly appeared as a second-half substitute at Constant Vanden Stock Stadium during a match against Belgium. As he replaced Cyrille Bayala less than an hour into the match, The Stallions were trailing 2–0. While on pitch, Badolo witnessed Christian Benteke's goal, which sealed the score line of the match at 3–0.

On 20 December 2023, Badolo was named among the 27 players selected by Hubert Velud to represent Burkina Faso at the 2023 Africa Cup of Nations.

On 8 December 2025, Badolo was named among the 25 players selected by head coach Brama Traoré to represent Burkina Faso at the 2025 Africa Cup of Nations.

== Career statistics ==
=== Club ===
As of match played 23 November 2024

Appearances and goals by club, season and competition
Club	Season	League			National cup (Note: Includes Slovak Cup, Moldovan Cup)		Europe		Total	
Club	Season	Division	Apps	Goals	Apps	Goals	Apps	Goals	Apps	Goals
Pohronie	2019–20	Slovak First Football League	14	1	1	0	-		15	1
Pohronie	2020–21	Slovak First Football League	25	0	1	0	-		26	0
Pohronie	2021–22	Slovak First Football League	19	2	1	1	-		20	3
Pohronie	Total		58	3	3	1	0	0	61	4
Sheriff Tiraspol (loan)	2021–22	Moldovan Super Liga	9	2	3	4	0 (Note: Zero appearances in the UEFA Champions League, UEFA Europa League, and UEFA Europa Conference League)	0	12	6
Sheriff Tiraspol (loan)	2022–23	Moldovan Super Liga	10	0	0	0	14 (Note: Six appearances and no goals in the UEFA Champions League, eight appearances and no goals in the UEFA Europa League)	0	24	0
Sheriff Tiraspol (loan)	Total		19	2	3	4	14	0	36	6
Sheriff Tiraspol	2022–23	Moldovan Super Liga	8	1	4	0	4 (Note: Four appearances and one goal in the UEFA Europa Conference League)	1	16	2
Sheriff Tiraspol	2023–24	Moldovan Super Liga	19	7	4	0	12 (Note: Three appearances and no goals in the UEFA Champions League, nine appearances and one goal in the UEFA Europa League)	1	35	8
Sheriff Tiraspol	2024–25	Moldovan Super Liga	12	2	0	0	6 (Note: Four appearances and no goals in the UEFA Europa League, and two appearances and no goals in the UEFA Conference League)	0	18	2
Spartak Trnava	2024–25	Slovak First League	9	0	0+1	0	—		9+1	0
Spartak Trnava	2025–26	Slovak First League	0	0	0	0	0+1	0	—	
Career total			116	15	14	5	36	2	166	22

== Honours ==
Salitas

- Coupe du Faso: 2018

Spartak Trnava

- Slovak Cup: 2024–25

== Personal life ==
Badolo is a practicing Christian. He is fluent in French.
