= Origbaajo Ismaila =

Nigerian footballer

Personal information
- Date of birth: 4 August 1998 (age 28)
- Place of birth: Ilorin, Nigeria
- Height: 1.88 m (6 ft 2 in)
- Position: Forward

Team information
- Current team: Kochi United
- Number: 19

Youth career
- Royal Football Academy

Senior career*
Years	Team	Apps	(Gls)
2016	Gateway United		
2017–2018	Bariga Professional		
2018	→ Cercle de Joachim (loan)		
2019–2021	Fukushima United	66	(25)
2021–2023	Kyoto Sanga	26	(3)
2023	→ Sheriff Tiraspol (loan)	8	(2)
2023	→ Tochigi (loan)	15	(4)
2024	Tochigi	17	(1)
2025	→ Sagamihara	8	(0)
2025	Becamex HCMC	12	(2)
2026	Vanraure Hachinohe	13	(0)
2026–	Kochi United	1	(0)
- * Club domestic league appearances and goals as of 21 August 2026

Origbaajo Ismaila (born 4 August 1998) is a Nigerian professional footballer currently playing as a forward for Kochi United.

== Career ==
During the 2021 season for Fukushima United FC, Ismalia won the J3 League Monthly MVP award in both May and July, scoring 8 goals in 14 games. His form earned him a transfer to J2 League side Kyoto Sanga in the 2021 summer transfer window.

On 21 February 2023, Sheriff Tiraspol announced the signing of Ismaila on loan from Kyoto Sanga. Ismaila played a part in Sheriff's league and cup double, after playing twelve games for the club and scoring five goals. Following the conclusion of the 2022–23 Moldovan Super Liga season, Ismaila returned to Japan where Kyoto Sanga then sent him out on loan to J2 League club Tochigi SC for the remainder of the 2023 season.

In August 2025, Ismaila moved to Vietnam, signing for V.League 1 side Becamex HCMC.

== Career statistics ==
=== Club ===
As of 31 July 2023.

Appearances and goals by club, season and competition
Club	Season	League			National cup (Note: Includes Emperor's Cup, Moldovan Cup)		League cup (Note: Includes J.League Cup)		Continental		Other		Total	
Club	Season	Division	Apps	Goals	Apps	Goals	Apps	Goals	Apps	Goals	Apps	Goals	Apps	Goals
Fukushima United	2019	J3 League	19	4	0	0	—		—		—		19	4
Fukushima United	2020	J3 League	33	13	0	0	—		—		—		33	13
Fukushima United	2021	J3 League	14	8	0	0	—		—		—		14	8
Fukushima United	Total		66	25	0	0	0	0	0	0	0	0	66	25
Kyoto Sanga	2021	J2 League	16	3	1	0	0	0	—		—		17	3
Kyoto Sanga	2022	J1 League	10	0	4	2	5	0	—		—		19	2
Kyoto Sanga	Total		26	3	5	2	5	0	0	0	0	0	36	5
Sheriff Tiraspol (loan)	2022–23	Moldovan Super Liga	8	2	4	3	—		0	0	—		12	5
Tochigi SC (loan)	2023	J2 League	2	1	0	0	—		—		—		2	1
Career total			102	31	9	5	5	0	0	0	0	0	116	36

== Honours ==
Sheriff Tiraspol

- Moldovan Super Liga: 2022–23
- Moldovan Cup: 2022–23
