= Giannis Fivos Botos =

Greek footballer (born 2000)

Personal information
- Full name: Ioannis Fivos Botos
- Date of birth: 20 December 2000 (age 25)
- Place of birth: Athens, Greece
- Height: 1.72 m (5 ft 8 in)
- Position: Attacking midfielder

Team information
- Current team: Pardubice
- Number: 90

Youth career
- –2008: AO Diana Ilioupolis
- 2008–2018: AEK Athens

Senior career*
Years	Team	Apps	(Gls)
2018–2023	AEK Athens	3	(0)
2021–2022	→ Go Ahead Eagles (loan)	43	(7)
2022–2023	→ Sheriff Tiraspol (loan)	7	(1)
2023	AEK Athens B	9	(1)
2023–2024	Helmond Sport	38	(9)
2024–2025	Slavia Prague	13	(1)
2024–2025	Slavia Prague B	2	(0)
2024–2025	→ Karviná (loan)	18	(0)
2025–	Pardubice	20	(0)

International career^{‡}
2017	Greece U17	2	(0)
2018–2019	Greece U19	6	(1)
2019–2022	Greece U21	15	(1)
- * Club domestic league appearances and goals as of 27 May 2026 ‡ National team caps and goals as of 11 June 2022

Giannis Fivos Botos (Greek: Γιάννης Φοίβος Μπότος; born 20 December 2000) is a Greek professional footballer who plays as an attacking midfielder for Czech First League club Pardubice.

== Career ==
=== AEK Athens ===
On 27 June 2018, Botos signed a professional contract with AEK Athens. On 19 January 2020, he made his debut in the Superleague in a 3–0 home win game against AEL coming on as a second-half substitute replacing the scorer of the second goal Nélson Oliveira at the 68th minute.

Botos is the first footballer in the history of AEK Athens, born after 2000, who has scored in an official game, at 4–0 away victory over Apollon Larissa at 31 October 2018.

==== Loan to Go Ahead Eagles ====
On 30 December 2020, Botos joined Go Ahead Eagles on loan until the summer of 2022. In May 2021, Go Ahead Eagles finished second in the Eerste Divisie, earning promotion back to the Eredivisie after four seasons in the second tier. He made an impressive match on 28 August, as he scored, to help his team seal an 2–0 win over Sparta Rotterdam. He was voted man of the match for his performance.

=== Slavia Prague ===
On 3 July 2024, Botos signed a professional contract with Slavia Prague until 30 June 2028.

==== Loan Karviná ====
On 19 July 2024, Botos joined Karviná on a one-year loan deal.

=== Pardubice ===
On 8 September 2025, Botos signed a multi-year contract with Pardubice.

== Career statistics ==
=== Club ===
As of match played 2 November 2024

Appearances and goals by club, season and competition
Club	Season	League			National cup (Note: Includes Greek Football Cup, KNVB Cup)		Europe		Total	
Club	Season	Division	Apps	Goals	Apps	Goals	Apps	Goals	Apps	Goals
AEK Athens	2018–19	Super League Greece	0	0	5	1	0	0	5	1
AEK Athens	2019–20	Super League Greece	2	0	0	0	—		2	0
AEK Athens	2020–21	Super League Greece	1	0	0	0	1 (Note: Appearance in UEFA Europa League)	0	2	0
AEK Athens	Total		3	0	5	1	1	0	9	1
Go Ahead Eagles (loan)	2020–21	Eerste Divisie	21	4	1	0	—		22	4
Go Ahead Eagles (loan)	2021–22	Eredivisie	22	3	2	1	—		25	4
Go Ahead Eagles (loan)	Total		43	7	3	1	—		47	8
FC Sheriff Tiraspol (loan)	2022–23	Moldovan Super Liga	7	1	1	2	3 (Note: Two appearances in UEFA Champions League, one appearance in UEFA Europa League)	0	11	3
AEK Athens B	2022–23	Super League Greece 2	9	1	0	0	—		9	1
Helmond Sport	2023–24	Eerste Divisie	38	9	1	0	—		39	9
Karviná (loan)	2024–25	Czech First League	18	0	1	0	—		19	0
Career total			118	18	11	4	4	0	133	22
