= Patrick Kpozo =

Ghanaian footballer (born 1997)

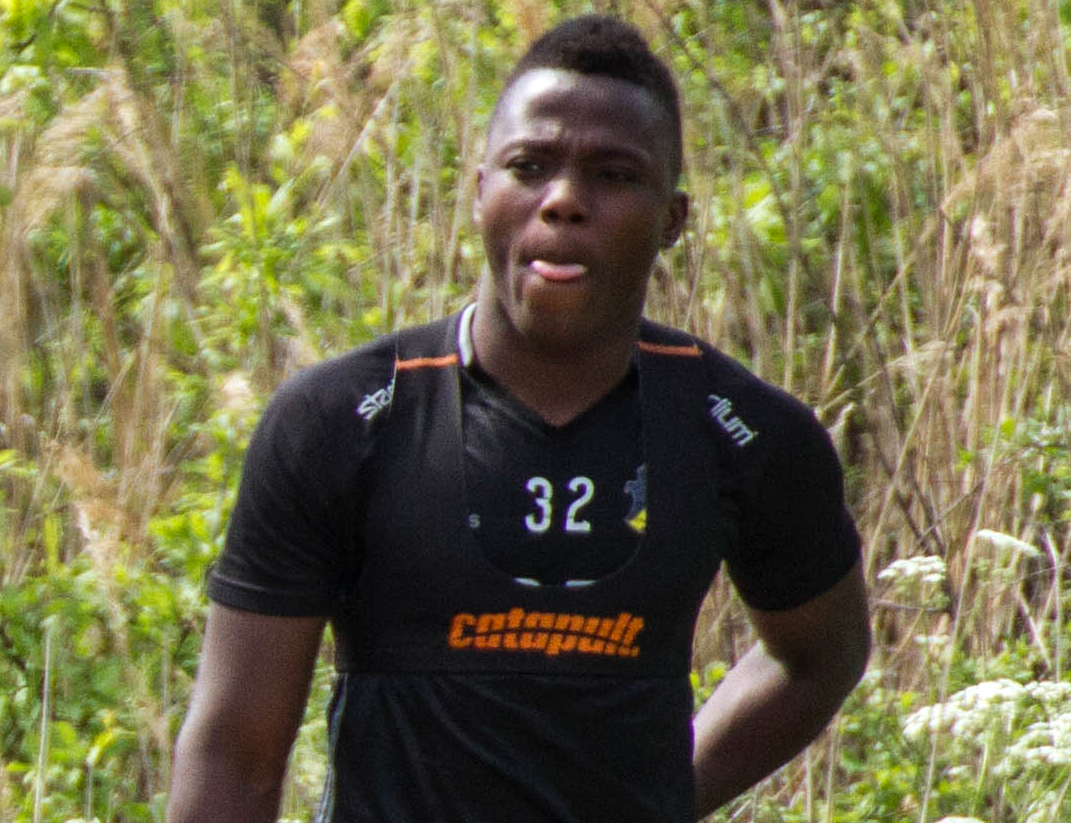
- Kpozo in 2016

Personal information
- Full name: Patrick Kpozo
- Date of birth: 15 July 1997 (age 29)
- Place of birth: Accra, Ghana
- Height: 1.80 m (5 ft 11 in)
- Position: Defender

Team information
- Current team: Zhenis
- Number: 3

Youth career
- –2015: Inter Allies

Senior career*
Years	Team	Apps	(Gls)
2015	Inter Allies	7	(0)
2015–2017	AIK	11	(0)
2017	→ Tromsø (loan)	2	(0)
2017–2022	Östersunds FK	48	(3)
2020	→ IFK Luleå (loan)	28	(6)
2022–2023	Sheriff Tiraspol	19	(0)
2023–2026	Baník Ostrava	51	(3)
2026–	Zhenis	15	(1)

International career^{‡}
2015	Ghana U20	2	(0)
2023–	Ghana	1	(0)
- * Club domestic league appearances and goals as of 1 November 2026 ‡ National team caps and goals as of 03:58, 30 August 2023 (UTC)

Patrick Kpozo (born 15 July 1997) is a Ghanaian professional footballer who plays for Kazakhstani club Zhenis as a defender.

== Club career ==
Kpozo made his professional debut for AIK in a Svenska Cupen match against Ekerö IK in 2015.

On 28 March 2017, Kpozo joined Tromsø on loan until the summer.

On 17 January 2022, Sheriff Tiraspol announced the signing of Kpozo.

On 29 June 2023, Kpozo signed a two-year contract with Baník Ostrava.

== International career ==
On 9 March 2023, Kpozo received his first call-up to the Ghana senior national team by head coach Chris Hughton for two qualifiers for the 2023 Africa Cup of Nations against Angola.

== Career statistics ==
As of match played 30 October 2021

Appearances and goals by club, season and competition
Club	Season	League			Cup		Continental		Total	
Club	Season	Division	Apps	Goals	Apps	Goals	Apps	Goals	Apps	Goals
AIK	2015	Allsvenskan	0	0	1	0	0	0	1	0
AIK	2016	Allsvenskan	11	0	1	0	5	0	17	0
AIK	Total		11	0	2	0	5	0	18	0
Tromsø IL (loan)	2017	Eliteserien	2	0	2	0	–	–	4	0
Tromsø IL (loan)	Total		2	0	2	0	0	0	4	0
Östersunds FK	2017	Allsvenskan	3	0	0	0	0	0	3	0
Östersunds FK	2018	Allsvenskan	16	1	1	0	0	0	17	1
Östersunds FK	2019	Allsvenskan	0	0	1	0	0	0	1	0
Östersunds FK	2021	Allsvenskan	26	2	1	0	0	0	27	2
Östersunds FK	Total		45	3	3	0	0	0	48	3
Luleå (loan)	2020	Ettan	28	6	0	0	–	–	28	6
Luleå (loan)	Total		28	6	0	0	0	0	28	6
Sheriff Tiraspol	2021–22	Divizia Națională	4	0	0	0	–	–	4	0
Sheriff Tiraspol	2022–23	Divizia Națională	7	0	0	0	16	0	0	0
Sheriff Tiraspol	Total		11	0	0	0	16	0	26	0
Career total			90	9	7	0	5	0	100	9

== Honours ==
Sheriff Tiraspol

- Moldovan Super Liga: 2022–23
