= Renan Guedes =

Brazilian footballer

Personal information
- Full name: Renan Guedes Borges
- Date of birth: 19 January 1998 (age 28)
- Place of birth: São Paulo, Brazil
- Height: 1.77 m (5 ft 10 in)
- Position: Right back

Team information
- Current team: NK Osijek
- Number: 42

Youth career
- 2010–2017: Corinthians
- 2017–2018: Atlético Mineiro

Senior career*
Years	Team	Apps	(Gls)
2019	Atlético Mineiro	2	(0)
2019–2020	Joinville	17	(1)
2021	Bahia	17	(0)
2022–2023	Sheriff Tiraspol	24	(0)
2023–	Osijek	59	(0)
- * Club domestic league appearances and goals as of 15 June 2026

Renan Guedes Borges (born 19 January 1998), known as Renan Guedes or just Guedes, is a Brazilian footballer who plays as a right back for Croatian club NK Osijek.

== Club career ==
Born in São Paulo, Guedes joined Corinthians' youth setup in 2010, aged twelve. On 13 October 2017, he left the club and signed for Atlético Mineiro, being initially assigned to the under-20 squad.

Guedes made his first team debut for Galo on 9 March 2019, coming on as a late substitute for Hulk in a 1–0 Campeonato Mineiro away win against Patrocinense. On 9 September, after one further match with the team, he moved to Joinville for the year's Copa Santa Catarina.

Guedes became a regular starter for Joinville in the 2020 Série D, and scored his first senior goal on 1 October of that year, in a 2–0 home win against São Luiz. The following 21 January, he agreed to a contract with Bahia.

Initially assigned to the under-23 for the Campeonato Baiano, Guedes started to feature for Bahia's main squad in April 2021, and subsequently made his Série A debut on 29 May by starting in a 3–0 home success over Santos.

Guedes left Bahia in December 2021, after his contract expired, and moved abroad on 26 January 2022, after signing for Moldovan club Sheriff Tiraspol.

== Career statistics ==
As of 6 May 2024

Club	Season	League			State League		Cup		Continental		Other		Total	
Club	Season	Division	Apps	Goals	Apps	Goals	Apps	Goals	Apps	Goals	Apps	Goals	Apps	Goals
Atlético Mineiro	2019	Série A	0	0	2	0	0	0	—		—		2	0
Joinville	2019	Série D	0	0	—		—		—		12 (Note: Appearance(s) in Copa Santa Catarina)	0	12	0
Joinville	2020	Série D	12	1	5	0	—		—		—		17	1
Joinville	Total		12	1	5	0	—		—		12	0	29	1
Bahia	2021	Série A	9	0	8	0	2	0	3 (Note: Appearance(s) in Copa Sudamericana)	0	2 (Note: Appearance(s) in Copa do Nordeste)	0	24	0
Sheriff Tiraspol	2022–23	Divizia Națională	8	0	—		2	0	—		—		10	0
Sheriff Tiraspol	2022–23	Divizia Națională	16	0	—		3	0	14	0	—		33	0
Sheriff Tiraspol	Total		24	0	—		5	0	14	0	—		43	0
Osijek	2023–24	Prva HNL	20	0	—		1	0	2	0	—		23	0
Career total			65	1	15	0	8	0	19	0	14	0	121	1

== Honours ==
Bahia

- Copa do Nordeste: 2021
