= Mudasiru Salifu =

Ghanaian footballer (born 1997)

Personal information
- Date of birth: 1 April 1997 (age 29)
- Place of birth: Tamale, Ghana
- Height: 1.77 m (5 ft 10 in)
- Position: Midfielder

Team information
- Current team: ES Sétif
- Number: 29

Youth career
- Berekum Chelsea
- CS Sfaxien

Senior career*
Years	Team	Apps	(Gls)
2017–2019	AS Tanda		
2019–2023	Asante Kotoko	57	(2)
2022	→ Sheriff Tiraspol (loan)	12	(0)
2023	→ Al-Batin (loan)	15	(0)
2023–2024	Al-Bukiryah	31	(0)
2025	Mash'al	10	(0)
2025–	ES Sétif	21	(0)
- * Club domestic league appearances and goals as of 31 August 2025

Mudasiru Salifu (born 1 April 1997) is a Ghanaian professional footballer who plays as a midfielder for Algerian club ES Sétif.

Mudasiru played for Ivorian club AS Tanda before joining Asante Kotoko in 2019. During his time with Kotoko, he won the President's Cup in 2019 and the 2021–22 Ghana Premier League. In 2022, he joined Moldovan club Sheriff Tiraspol on loan, featuring in the UEFA Europa League, before spending a further loan spell with Saudi Arabian club Al-Batin. He subsequently played for Al-Bukiryah and Uzbek club Mash'al Mubarek before joining ES Sétif in 2025.

At international level, Mudasiru has represented Ghana's home-based national team. In November 2022, he was also named in Ghana's 55-man provisional squad for the 2022 FIFA World Cup, although he was not selected for the final tournament squad.

== Club career ==
=== Early career ===
Mudasiru began his senior career with Berekum Chelsea. In 2017, he joined Ivorian club AS Tanda on loan, spending the 2017–18 season with the club before returning to Berekum Chelsea in June 2018.

He remained with Berekum Chelsea until 2019, when he moved to Asante Kotoko.

=== Asante Kotoko ===
In July 2019, Mudasiru signed a two-year contract with Asante Kotoko. He joined the club from Berekum Chelsea ahead of the 2019–20 season.

In December 2019, Mudasiru won his first trophy with the club when Asante Kotoko defeated rivals Hearts of Oak 2–1 to win the President's Cup. He made his Ghana Premier League debut for Kotoko on 29 December 2019, starting in central midfield in a 1–0 victory over Techiman Eleven Wonders. He made six league appearances during the 2019–20 season, which was eventually cancelled.

Mudasiru established himself as a regular member of the Kotoko midfield during the 2020–21 season, making 23 league appearances as the club finished second in the league.

Ahead of the 2021–22 season, Mudasiru was appointed the club's second deputy captain by head coach Prosper Narteh Ogum, following the departures of Felix Annan and Emmanuel Gyamfi. He scored in Kotoko's opening league match of the season on 30 October 2021, netting the equaliser as the club came from behind to defeat Dreams FC 3–1.

Mudasiru went on to make 28 league appearances and score two goals during the season, becoming a regular member of a midfield that helped Kotoko win the 2021–22 Ghana Premier League.

Following the conclusion of the season, Mudasiru travelled to Moldova for a trial with Sheriff Tiraspol. After impressing during the trial, he joined the Moldovan champions in July 2022.

=== Sheriff Tiraspol ===
In July 2022, Mudasiru joined Moldovan champions Sheriff Tiraspol on loan from Asante Kotoko until the end of the year, with an option to make the move permanent.

During his spell with Sheriff, Mudasiru featured in both domestic and European competitions. He was involved in the club's 2022–23 UEFA Champions League qualifying campaign before featuring in the 2022–23 UEFA Europa League group stage. He made six appearances in the Europa League, including three starts, as Sheriff competed in a group containing Manchester United, Real Sociedad and Omonia.

On 13 October 2022, he made his first Europa League start, playing the full match against Real Sociedad. His loan spell ended in December 2022, after which he returned to Asante Kotoko.

=== Saudi Arabia ===
In January 2023, Mudasiru joined Saudi Pro League club Al-Batin on loan from Asante Kotoko until the end of the 2022–23 season, with an option to make the transfer permanent.

He made his league debut on 7 January, starting against Al-Fayha and playing 80 minutes in a 2–2 draw. Mudasiru made 15 league appearances, including 12 starts, during his spell with the club. Al-Batin finished the season bottom of the league and were relegated to the Saudi First Division League.

Following the expiration of his loan, Mudasiru returned to Asante Kotoko before leaving the club permanently in July 2023 to join Saudi First Division side Al-Bukiryah. The transfer ended his four-year association with Kotoko. He became a regular member of the Al-Bukiryah midfield during the 2023–24 season, making 31 league appearances before leaving the club in 2024.

=== Mash'al Mubarek ===
In February 2025, Mudasiru joined Uzbekistan Super League club Mash'al Mubarek. During his five-month spell in Uzbekistan, he featured regularly for the club in the Super League.

=== ES Sétif ===
In July 2025, Mudasiru joined Algerian Ligue 1 club ES Sétif from Uzbek side Mash'al Mubarek. The move marked his return to African club football after spells in Moldova, Saudi Arabia and Uzbekistan. He became part of Sétif's first-team squad for the 2025–26 Ligue 1 season, featuring regularly in midfield during his first campaign with the club.

== International career ==
Mudasiru represented Ghana at home-based national-team level. In 2019, he was included in the Black Stars B squad during preparations for the 2020 African Nations Championship (CHAN) qualifiers.

He was recalled to the Black Stars B setup in August 2021, joining the national-team camp at the Ghanaman Soccer Centre of Excellence in Prampram.

In May 2022, head coach Annor Walker named Mudasiru in a 35-man Black Stars B squad to prepare for the 2023 CHAN qualifiers against Benin. He subsequently became ineligible to represent the home-based national team after joining Moldovan club Sheriff Tiraspol in July 2022.

In November 2022, Mudasiru received his first call-up to the senior Ghana national football team, when head coach Otto Addo included him in Ghana's 55-man provisional squad for the 2022 FIFA World Cup. He was not selected for the final 26-man squad.

== Personal life ==
Mudasiru married Zainab Mohammed in Kumasi on 5 September 2021. He is a devout Muslim and has cited former Ghanaian international Mubarak Wakaso and Sulley Muntari as his role models, stating that he had followed both players since childhood.

== Honours ==
Asante Kotoko

- Ghana Premier League: 2021–22
- President's Cup: 2019

Sheriff Tiraspol

- Moldovan Super Liga: 2022–23
