= Michael López (Argentine footballer) =

Argentine footballer

Personal information
- Full name: Michael Steven López
- Date of birth: 19 August 1997 (age 29)
- Place of birth: Lomas de Zamora, Argentina
- Height: 1.81 m (5 ft 11 1/2 in)
- Position: Centre-forward

Team information
- Current team: Danubio
- Number: 21

Youth career
- Banfield

Senior career*
Years	Team	Apps	(Gls)
2017–2021	Banfield	12	(0)
2018–2019	→ Defensores (loan)	7	(0)
2019–2020	→ Fénix (loan)	18	(1)
2021	Minsk	24	(7)
2022	AC Oulu	27	(10)
2023	Sheriff Tiraspol	5	(0)
2023	Honka	8	(1)
2024	Lahti	25	(9)
2025	Kecskeméti TE	11	(0)
2025–	Danubio	3	(0)
- * Club domestic league appearances and goals as of 1 October 2025

Michael Steven López (born 19 August 1997) is an Argentine professional footballer who plays as a centre-forward for Danubio.

== Career ==
López first appeared in the first-team of Argentine Primera División side Banfield in May 2017, as an unused substitute for a Copa Argentina match against Chaco For Ever. On 14 October, López made his professional debut in the Primera División against Estudiantes, coming on as a late substitute for Darío Cvitanich. After a second appearance versus Colón two weeks later, López made his first start in a league match with San Lorenzo on 4 November. His first senior goal arrived on 18 July 2018 in a Copa Argentina round of sixty-four defeat against General Lamadrid of Primera C Metropolitana.

Ahead of January 2019, López was loaned out to Primera B Nacional's Defensores de Belgrano. Seven appearances followed in six months. July 2019 saw López agree a loan move to Fénix. He debuted in a defeat away to Almirante Brown on 3 August, which preceded his first goal coming in September against Flandria. He returned to Banfield in June 2020, as he subsequently trained with their reserves.

On 6 March 2021, López headed to Belarus with Premier League side Minsk. He debuted in a cup quarter-final first leg draw with Isloch later that day.

On 13 December 2021, he signed with AC Oulu in Finland. During the 2022 season, he scored 10 goals in 27 appearances in Veikkausliiga.

On 2 February 2023, he signed with Moldovan side Sheriff Tiraspol. On 12 June 2023, Sheriff Tiraspol announced that Lopez had left the club by mutual agreement.

Lopez returned to Finland, and after a short stint with FC Honka in 2023, Lopez signed a deal with FC Lahti for the 2024 season.

On 4 December 2024, he signed with Kecskeméti TE in Hungarian Nemzeti Bajnokság I.

== Career statistics ==
As of 5 June 2025

Club statistics
Club	Season	League			Cup (Note: Includes Copa Argentina, Belarusian Cup, Suomen Cup and Cupa Moldovei)		League cup (Note: Includes Finnish League Cup)		Continental		Total	
Club	Season	Division	Apps	Goals	Apps	Goals	Apps	Goals	Apps	Goals	Apps	Goals
Banfield	2017–18	Primera División	7	0	0	0	—		0	0	7	0
Banfield	2018–19	Primera División	5	0	1	1	0	0	2 (Note: Appearance(s) in the Copa Libertadores)	0	8	1
Banfield	Total		12	0	1	1	0	0	2	0	15	1
Defensores de Belgrano (loan)	2018–19	Primera B Nacional	7	0	0	0	—		—		7	0
Fénix (loan)	2019–20	Primera B Nacional	18	1	0	0	—		—		18	1
Minsk	2021	Belarusian Premier League	24	7	3	0	—		—		27	7
AC Oulu	2022	Veikkausliiga	27	10	2	1	3	0	—		32	11
Sheriff Tiraspol	2022–23	Moldovan Super Liga	5	0	4	3	—		0	0	9	3
Honka	2023	Veikkausliiga	8	1	2	0	0	0	0	0	10	1
Lahti	2024	Veikkausliiga	25	9	1	0	4	2	—		30	11
Kecskeméti TE	2024–25	NB I	11	0	0	0	—		—		11	0
Career total			138	28	13	5	7	2	2	0	160	35
