= Dumitru Celeadnic =

Moldovan footballer

Personal information
- Date of birth: 23 April 1992 (age 34)
- Place of birth: Cojusna, Moldova
- Height: 1.92 m (6 ft 3 1/2 in)
- Position: Goalkeeper

Team information
- Current team: Kyzylzhar
- Number: 1

Senior career*
Years	Team	Apps	(Gls)
2012–2014	Speranța Crihana Veche	17	(0)
2014–2017	Dacia Chișinău	3	(0)
2015–2016	→ Dinamo-Auto Tiraspol (loan)	16	(0)
2017–2019	Petrocub Hîncești	45	(0)
2019–2023	Sheriff Tiraspol	47	(0)
2023	Politehnica Iași	0	(0)
2023–2024	Sheriff Tiraspol	16	(0)
2025–2026	Ordabasy	4	(0)
2026–	Kyzylzhar	30	(0)

International career^{‡}
2019–	Moldova	18	(0)
- * Club domestic league appearances and goals as of 30 October 2026 ‡ National team caps and goals as of 14 November 2026

Dumitru Celeadnic (born 23 April 1992) is a Moldovan professional footballer who plays as a goalkeeper for Kazakhstan Premier League club Kyzylzhar and the Moldova national team.

== International career ==
Celeadnic made his international debut in February 2019, when his own-goal ensured Moldova lost 1–0 to Kazakhstan in a friendly.

== Honours ==
Sheriff Tiraspol

- Super Liga: 2019, 2020–21, 2021–22, 2022–23
- Cupa Moldovei: 2018–19, 2021–22, 2022–23
