= Christ Bekale =

Gabonese footballer

Personal information
- Full name: Christ Junior-Ray Eneme Bekale
- Date of birth: 20 March 1999 (age 27)
- Place of birth: Libreville, Gabon
- Height: 1.84 m (6 ft 0 in)
- Position: Midfielder

Youth career
- ASJ Ambomo

Senior career*
Years	Team	Apps	(Gls)
–2018	CS Libreville		
2018–2020	Métlaoui	20	(0)
2020	Bizertin	3	(0)
2020–2021	Tataouine	0	(0)
2021–2022	Almahalla		
2022–2023	Sidi Bouzid	9	(2)
2023	Sheriff Tiraspol	7	(0)
2023–2024	Future FC	0	(0)

International career
2018	Gabon U20		
- * Club domestic league appearances and goals as of 25 January 2024

Christ Junior-Ray Eneme Bekale (born 20 March 1999) is a Gabonese professional footballer who plays as a midfielder.

== Career ==
On 8 February 2023, Sheriff Tiraspol announced the signing of Bekale.

During the summer of 2023, Bekale signed a two-year contract with Future FC.

=== National team ===
In March, he is summoned for the first by Patrice Neveu in his list of 23 players to play in the CAN 2023 qualifiers for the double confrontation against Sudan.

== Career statistics ==
=== Club ===
As of 24 February 2021.

Club	Season	League			Cup		Continental		Other		Total	
Club	Season	Division	Apps	Goals	Apps	Goals	Apps	Goals	Apps	Goals	Apps	Goals
Métlaoui	2018–19	CLP-1	14	0	0	0	0	0	0	0	14	0
Métlaoui	2019–20	CLP-1	6	0	0	0	0	0	0	0	6	0
Métlaoui	Total		20	0	0	0	0	0	0	0	20	0
Bizertin	2019–20	CLP-1	3	0	0	0	0	0	0	0	3	0
Tataouine	2020–21	CLP-1	0	0	0	0	0	0	0	0	0	0
Career total			23	0	0	0	0	0	0	0	23	0
