= Osvaldo Cruz Futebol Clube =

Association football club in Brazil

Osvaldo Cruz
- Full name: Osvaldo Cruz Futebol Clube
- Nickname(s): Azulão
- Founded: February 17, 2004; 21 years ago
- Ground: Estádio Breno Ribeiro do Val
- Capacity: 13,478
- League: Paulista Segunda Divisão
- 2022: Paulistão 2ª Divisão, 19th of 36
| Home colours | Away colours |

Osvaldo Cruz Futebol Clube, commonly known as Osvaldo Cruz, is a Brazilian football club based in Osvaldo Cruz, São Paulo that competes in the Campeonato Paulista Segunda Divisão, the fourth tier of the São Paulo state football league.

== History ==
The club was founded on February 17, 2004. Osvaldo Cruz finished in the second position in the Campeonato Paulista Segunda Divisão in 2005, losing the competition to São Carlos.

== Stadium ==
Osvaldo Cruz Futebol Clube play their home games at Estádio Breno Ribeiro do Val, nicknamed Brenão. The stadium has a maximum capacity of 13,478 people.
