= Dinu Graur =

Moldovan footballer

Personal information
- Date of birth: 27 December 1994 (age 31)
- Place of birth: Chișinău, Moldova
- Height: 1.75 m (5 ft 9 in)
- Position: Right back

Team information
- Current team: Milsami Orhei
- Number: 22

Youth career
- Zimbru Chișinău

Senior career*
| Years | Team | Apps | (Gls) |
| 2013–2016 | Zimbru Chișinău | 28 | (0) |
| 2016–2019 | Milsami Orhei | 80 | (3) |
| 2019–2020 | Astra Giurgiu | 8 | (0) |
| 2021 | AEL | 8 | (0) |
| 2022– | Milsami Orhei | 18 | (0) |

International career^{‡}
| 2014–2016 | Moldova U21 (Note: Only official UEFA matches included) | 12 | (1) |
| 2017– | Moldova | 17 | (0) |
- * Club domestic league appearances and goals as of 13 October 2023 ‡ National team caps and goals as of 14 October 2020

Dinu Graur (born 27 December 1994) is a Moldovan professional footballer who last played as a defender for Milsami Orhei and the Moldova national team.

In his career, Graur played for clubs such as Zimbru Chișinău, Milsami Orhei or Astra Giurgiu.

== Honours ==
Zimbru Chișinău

- Moldovan Cup: 2013–14
- Moldovan Super Cup (2): 2014, 2019
