= Anatol Teslev =

Moldovan footballer and manager

Personal information
- Date of birth: 16 September 1947 (age 79)
- Place of birth: Chișinău, Moldavian SSR, Soviet Union
- Height: 1.68 m (5 ft 6 in)
- Position: Midfielder

Senior career*
Years	Team	Apps	(Gls)
1965–1968	Moldova Chişinău		
1969	Chernomorets Odesa		
1970–1973	Moldova Chişinău		
1975	Dynamo Vologda		

Managerial career
- 1985–1986: Nistru Chişinău
- 1988: Start Ulyanovsk
- 1989: Nistru Chişinău
- 1990–1991: Tighina Bender
- ?: Moldova youth
- 2006: Moldova
- * Club domestic league appearances and goals

Anatol Teslev (born 16 September 1947) is a Moldovan association football head coach and former player.

== Playing career ==
He won UEFA European Under-18 Football Championship for USSR in 1966 (now U-19 event). Former clubs include Moldova Chişinău, FC Dynamo Vologda, Speranta Drochia.

== Coaching career ==
He coached Nistru, FC Start Ulyanovsk, FC Tighina Bender, FC Nistru Otaci and the Moldovan youth team.

He was the coach of the national side between February and December 2006.

He was replaced by his assistant Igor Dobrovolski.

== Management career ==
He was the vice-president and general secretary of the Football Association of Moldova and in the management board of FC Zimbru Chișinău and FC Constructorul Chisinau.

In 2005, he became the president of the nation FA, beaten Pavel Cebanu in election.
