= 2022–23 Moldovan Super Liga =

Super Liga
- Season: 2022–23
- Dates: 30 July 2022 – 20 May 2023
- Champions: Sheriff; 21st title
- Relegated: Dinamo-Auto
- Champions League: Sheriff
- Conference League: Petrocub; Zimbru; Milsami
- Matches: 86
- Goals: 183 (2.13 per match)
- Top goalscorer: Rasheed Akanbi; Alexandru Dedov (8 goals each)
- Best goalkeeper: Nikos Giannakopoulos (10 clean sheets)

The 2022–23 Moldovan Super Liga was the 32nd season of top-tier football in Moldova. The season started on 30 July 2022 and ended on 20 May 2023. The winners of the league this season earned a spot in the first qualifying round of the 2023–24 UEFA Champions League, the second placed club earned a place in the second qualifying round and the third and fourth placed clubs earned a place in the first qualifying round of the 2023–24 UEFA Europa Conference League.

== Teams ==
A total of 8 teams competed in the league. The top 7 teams from the 2021–22 season and one promoted team from the Divizia A: Dacia Buiucani, returning to the top tier after one-year absence.

=== Stadiums and locations ===
Bălți	Dacia Buiucani (Note: Dacia Buiucani are playing their home matches in Suruceni, instead of their stadium, the Joma Arena in Chișinău, which did not meet requirements.)	Dinamo-Auto	Milsami
Bălți Stadium	Suruceni Stadium (Note: Joma Arena used as home ground in round 14 (Phase I).)	Dinamo-Auto Stadium	District Complex (Note: CPSM Stadium used as home ground in round 2 (Phase II).); UEFA
Capacity: 5,200	Capacity: 350	Capacity: 1,300	Capacity: 3,000
Petrocub	2022–23 Moldovan Super Liga is located in Moldova		Sfîntul Gheorghe (Note: Sfîntul Gheorghe are playing their home matches in Chișinău, instead of their stadium, the Suruceni Stadium in Suruceni.)
Hîncești Stadium	2022–23 Moldovan Super Liga is located in Moldova		Zimbru-2 Stadium (Note: CPTF Stadium used as home ground in round 2 (Phase II).)
Capacity: 1,100	2022–23 Moldovan Super Liga is located in Moldova		Capacity: 2,000
Sheriff	2022–23 Moldovan Super Liga is located in Moldova		Zimbru
Sheriff small Arena; UEFA	2022–23 Moldovan Super Liga is located in Moldova		Zimbru Stadium (Note: Zimbru-2 Stadium used as home ground in round 7 (Phase I) and in round 7 (Phase II). CPTF Stadium used as home ground in round 1 (Phase II).); UEFA
Capacity: 9,181	2022–23 Moldovan Super Liga is located in Moldova		Capacity: 10,104

=== Personnel and kits ===
Note: Flags indicate national team as has been defined under FIFA eligibility rules. Players and managers may hold more than one non-FIFA nationality.

Team	Head coach	Captain	Kit maker	Shirt sponsor
Sheriff	(Italy) Roberto Bordin (Note: Stjepan Tomas (matches 1–12), Victor Mihailov (matches 13–14), Roberto Bordin (matches 15–24).)	(Bosnia and Herzegovina) Stjepan Radeljić (Note: Stjepan Radeljić started the match as captain nine times, Amine Talal eight times, Dumitru Celeadnic four times, Maksym Koval twice, and Stefanos Evangelou once.)	Adidas	none
Petrocub	(Moldova) Ivan Tabanov	(Moldova) Vladimir Ambros (Note: Vladimir Ambros started the match as captain seventeen times, and Ion Jardan seven times.)	Puma	none
Zimbru	(Moldova) Lilian Popescu (Note: Vlad Goian (matches 1–5), Lilian Popescu (matches 6–24).)	(Moldova) Ștefan Burghiu (Note: Ștefan Burghiu started the match as captain nineteen times, Alexandru Dedov four times, and Nikos Giannakopoulos once.)	Macron	Chateau Vartely, A.M.G, apă pură
Sfîntul Gheorghe	(Moldova) Nicolai Mandrîcenco (Note: Nicolai Mandrîcenco (matches 1–21), Stanislav Luca (match 22) (Note: Nicolai Mandrîcenco was absent and the assistant coach led the team.), Nicolai Mandrîcenco (matches 23–24).)	(Moldova) Nicolae Calancea (Note: Nicolae Calancea started the match as captain nine times, Alexandru Suvorov seven times, Mihail Ștefan four times, Serghei Svinarenco three times, and Cedric Ngah once.)	Macron	Yolo, Minatait-Studio, 57
Milsami	(Moldova) Serghei Dubrovin (Note: Serghei Dubrovin (matches 1–14), Ghenadie Pușca (matches 15–16) (Note: Serghei Dubrovin was absent and the assistant coach led the team.), Serghei Dubrovin (matches 17–24).)	(Moldova) Vadim Bolohan (Note: Vadim Bolohan started the match as captain twelve times, Alexandru Antoniuc six times, Petru Racu three times, and Radu Gînsari three times.)	Macron	DFM Duty Free
Bălți	(Moldova) Veaceslav Rusnac (Note: Serghei Cebotari (matches 1–10), Veaceslav Rusnac (matches 11–24).)	(Moldova) Andrei Rusnac (Note: Andrei Rusnac started the match as captain twenty-one times, Álvaro Bely twice, and Ivan Voropai once.)	Joma	Primăria Municipiului Bălți, Floris
Dacia Buiucani	(Moldova) Andrei Martin	(Moldova) Eugen Zasavițchi (Note: Eugen Zasavițchi started the match as captain ten times, Vadim Cravcescu three times, and Maxim Focșa once.)	Joma	Primăria Chișinău, Art Sport, OM, BP
Dinamo-Auto	(Azerbaijan) Novruz Azimov (Note: Samet Aker (match 1) (Note: The goalkeeping coach led the team.), Anatol Teslev (matches 2–7), Novruz Azimov (matches 8–14).)	(Gabon) Nathanael Mbourou (Note: Nathanael Mbourou started the match as captain seven times, Habib Fofana five times, Dallian Allogho once, and Federico Nsue once.)	Pody	none

=== Managerial changes ===
Team	Outgoing manager	Manner of departure	Date of vacancy	Position in table	Replaced by	Date of appointment
Petrocub	(Moldova) Lilian Popescu	Resigned	16 May 2022	Pre-season	(Moldova) Alexei Savinov	1 June 2022
Sheriff	(Ukraine) Yuriy Vernydub	Resigned	8 June 2022	Pre-season	(Croatia) Stjepan Tomas	21 June 2022
Zimbru	(Italy) Michele Bon	Released	17 June 2022	Pre-season	(Moldova) Vlad Goian	26 June 2022
Petrocub	(Moldova) Alexei Savinov	No UEFA Pro Licence	1 July 2022	Pre-season	(Moldova) Ivan Tabanov	1 July 2022
Dinamo-Auto	(Moldova) Oleg Bejenar	Released	1 July 2022	Pre-season	(Moldova) Anatol Teslev (caretaker)	6 August 2022
Zimbru	(Moldova) Vlad Goian	Resigned	30 August 2022	7th	(Moldova) Lilian Popescu	31 August 2022
Dinamo-Auto	(Moldova) Anatol Teslev	End of caretaker period	9 September 2022	8th	(Azerbaijan) Novruz Azimov	9 September 2022
Bălți	(Moldova) Serghei Cebotari	Resigned	10 October 2022	6th	(Moldova) Veaceslav Rusnac	11 October 2022
Sheriff	(Croatia) Stjepan Tomas	Resigned	25 October 2022	1st	(Moldova) Victor Mihailov (caretaker)	25 October 2022
Sheriff	(Moldova) Victor Mihailov	End of caretaker period	9 January 2023	1st	(Italy) Roberto Bordin	9 January 2023

== Phase I ==
Pos	Team	Pld	W	D	L	GF	GA	GD	Pts	Qualification or relegation
1	Sheriff Tiraspol	14	10	3	1	24	6	+18	33	Qualification to Phase II
2	Petrocub Hîncești	14	8	3	3	20	11	+9	27	Qualification to Phase II
3	Zimbru Chișinău	14	4	7	3	17	17	0	19 (Note: Head-to-head points: Zimbru : 4, Sfîntul Gheorghe : 1.)	Qualification to Phase II
4	Sfîntul Gheorghe	14	6	1	7	18	22	−4	19	Qualification to Phase II
5	Milsami Orhei	14	4	5	5	12	14	−2	17 (Note: Head-to-head points: Milsami : 4, Bălți : 1.)	Qualification to Phase II
6	Bălți	14	5	2	7	13	13	0	17	Qualification to Phase II
7	Dacia Buiucani	14	4	4	6	14	14	0	16	Relegation to Liga 1 Phase II
8	Dinamo-Auto	14	1	3	10	5	26	−21	0 (Note: Dinamo-Auto had 6 points deducted for match-fixing allegations.)	Relegation to Liga 1 Phase II

Source: FMF, UEFA, Soccerway
Rules for classification: 1) Points; 2) Head-to-head points; 3) Head-to-head goal difference; 4) Head-to-head away goals scored; 5) Head-to-head goals scored; 6) Matches won; 7) Goal difference; 8) Goals scored; 9) Least red cards; 10) Least yellow cards.

=== Results ===
For matches 1–14, each team plays every other team twice (once home, once away).

Home \ Away	BĂL	DAC	DIN	MIL	PET	SFÎ	SHE	ZIM
Bălți	—	0–1	1–0	1–1	0–1	4–0	0–3	0–2
Dacia Buiucani	0–0	—	5–0	0–2	0–0	2–0	0–2	0–0
Dinamo-Auto	0–1	2–0	—	1–1	1–4	0–2	0–1	0–0
Milsami Orhei	1–0	1–1	0–0	—	1–0	2–3	0–2	1–0
Petrocub Hîncești	1–0	1–0	4–0	2–1	—	0–2	1–0	2–2
Sfîntul Gheorghe	1–2	1–0	3–0	1–0	1–2	—	1–3	0–1
Sheriff Tiraspol	2–1	2–1	2–0	2–0	1–1	3–0	—	0–0
Zimbru Chișinău	0–3	3–4	2–1	1–1	2–1	3–3	1–1	—

Source: FMF, Soccerway
Legend: Blue = home team win; Yellow = draw; Red = away team win.

== Phase II ==
Pos	Team	Pld	W	D	L	GF	GA	GD	Pts	Qualification
1	Sheriff Tiraspol (C)	10	7	3	0	15	3	+12	24	Qualification for the Champions League first qualifying round
2	Petrocub Hîncești	10	6	3	1	16	6	+10	21	Qualification for the Europa Conference League second qualifying round
3	Zimbru Chișinău	10	3	3	4	10	9	+1	12	Qualification for the Europa Conference League first qualifying round
4	Milsami Orhei	10	3	2	5	10	16	−6	11	Qualification for the Europa Conference League first qualifying round
5	Sfîntul Gheorghe	10	1	4	5	4	13	−9	7	Dissolved after the season (Note: Sfîntul Gheorghe withdrew before the start of the next season.)
6	Bălți	10	0	5	5	5	13	−8	5	

Source: FMF, UEFA, Soccerway
Rules for classification: 1) Points; 2) Play-off (only if deciding champion when two teams tied); 3) Head-to-head points; 4) Head-to-head goal difference; 5) Head-to-head away goals scored; 6) Head-to-head goals scored; 7) Matches won; 8) Goal difference; 9) Goals scored; 10) Least red cards; 11) Least yellow cards.
(C) Champions

=== Results ===
For matches 1–10, each team plays every other team twice. Sheriff will play (7 at home and 3 away), Petrocub (6 at home and 4 away), Zimbru and Sfîntul Gheorghe (5 at home and 5 away), Milsami (4 at home and 6 away), Bălți (3 at home and 7 away).

Home \ Away	SHE	PET	ZIM	SFÎ	MIL	BĂL	SHE	PET	ZIM	SFÎ	MIL	BĂL
Sheriff Tiraspol	—	1–0	0–0	1–0	2–1	1–0	—	—	—	—	4–0	1–1
Petrocub Hîncești	1–1	—	3–2	3–0	2–1	0–0	—	—	—	—	—	3–0
Zimbru Chișinău	0–2	1–2	—	0–0	0–1	1–0	—	—	—	—	—	—
Sfîntul Gheorghe	0–2	0–0	0–2	—	1–1	1–1	—	—	—	—	—	—
Milsami Orhei	—	0–2	0–3	3–0	—	1–0	—	—	—	—	—	—
Bălți	—	—	1–1	0–2	2–2	—	—	—	—	—	—	—

Source: FMF, Soccerway
Legend: Blue = home team win; Yellow = draw; Red = away team win.

== Season statistics ==
=== Top goalscorers ===
Rank	Player	Club	Goals
1	(Nigeria) Rasheed Akanbi	Sheriff	8
1	(Moldova) Alexandru Dedov	Zimbru	8
3	(Moldova) Marius Iosipoi	Petrocub	7
4	(Moldova) Radu Gînsari	Milsami	6
5	(Nigeria) Jibril Ibrahim	Sfîntul Gheorghe	5
5	(Moldova) Vladimir Ambros	Petrocub	5
5	(Moldova) Victor Bogaciuc	Petrocub	5
8	(Guinea-Bissau) Steve Ambri	Sheriff	4
8	(Nigeria) Emmanuel Alaribe	Zimbru	4
8	(Moldova) Eugen Sidorenco	Zimbru	4
8	(Senegal) Mouhamed Diop	Sheriff	4

==== Hat-tricks ====
Player	Home	Away	Result	Date
(Moldova) Alexandru Dedov	Zimbru	Sfîntul Gheorghe	3–3	11 September 2022

=== Clean sheets ===
Rank	Player	Club	Clean sheets
1	(Greece) Nikos Giannakopoulos	Zimbru	10
2	(Ghana) Razak Abalora	Sheriff	7
2	(Moldova) Cristian Avram	Petrocub	7
4	(Moldova) Sebastian Agachi	Zimbru (0) & Dacia Buiucani (6)	6
4	(Moldova) Victor Străistari	Sfîntul Gheorghe (3) & Bălți (3)	6
6	(Moldova) Dumitru Celeadnic	Sheriff	5
6	(Moldova) Nicolae Calancea	Sfîntul Gheorghe	5
8	(Moldova) Emil Tîmbur	Milsami	4
9	(Ukraine) Maksym Koval	Sheriff	3
9	(Moldova) Igor Mostovei	Petrocub	3
9	(Moldova) Victor Buga	Milsami	3
9	(Gabon) Dallian Allogho	Dinamo-Auto	3
9	(Moldova) Stanislav Namașco	Bălți	3
