= Serafim Cojocari =

Moldovan footballer (born 2001)

Personal information
- Date of birth: 7 January 2001 (age 25)
- Place of birth: Rezina, Moldova
- Height: 1.80 m (5 ft 11 in)
- Position: Midfielder

Team information
- Current team: Petrocub Hîncești
- Number: 77

Youth career
- –2020: Zimbru Chișinău
- 2020: Sheriff Tiraspol

Senior career*
Years	Team	Apps	(Gls)
2019–2020	Zimbru Chișinău	8	(0)
2020–2021	Sheriff-2 Tiraspol		
2021–2023	Sheriff Tiraspol	3	(0)
2022–2023	→ Bălți (loan)	15	(3)
2023–2024	Unirea Slobozia	27	(1)
2024–2026	Zimbru Chișinău	12	(3)
2026–	Petrocub Hîncești	0	(0)

International career^{‡}
2018	Moldova U17	3	(0)
2019	Moldova U18	3	(0)
2019	Moldova U19	3	(0)
2020–2022	Moldova U21	11	(0)
2023–	Moldova	12	(0)
- * Club domestic league appearances and goals as of 26 October 2026 ‡ National team caps and goals as of 8 June 2024

Serafim Cojocari (born 7 January 2001) is a Moldovan professional footballer who plays as a midfielder for Moldovan Liga club Petrocub Hîncești and the Moldova national team.

== Club career ==
Cojocari was born in Rezina and started his career with Zimbru Chișinău. He made his Moldovan National Division debut for the club on 4 August 2019 in a 3–0 loss against Sheriff Tiraspol. In March 2020, he signed a four-year contract with Sheriff Tiraspol, joining their reserve team. He made his first appearance for Sheriff's first team on 7 August 2021, coming on as a substitute in a 7–1 win against Dinamo-Auto.

On 1 September 2022, Cojocari joined CSF Bălți on a one-season loan.

== International career ==
Cojocari has featured for Moldovan national youth teams at under-19 and under-21 level. He made his debut for the Moldova national team on 24 March 2023, replacing Victor Mudrac in the 73rd minute of a 1–1 draw against Faroe Islands in the UEFA Euro 2024 qualifying.

=== International stats ===
As of match played 15 October 2023

Appearances and goals by national team and year
National team	Year	Apps	Goals
Moldova	2023	10	0
Moldova	2024	1	0
Total		11	0

== Honours ==
Sheriff Tiraspol

- Divizia Națională: 2021–22
- Cupa Moldovei: 2021–22

Sheriff-2 Tiraspol

- Divizia A: 2021–22

Unirea Slobozia

- Liga II: 2023–24
