= 2018 Coupe du Faso =

Tournament details
- Country: Burkina Faso

Final positions
- Champions: Salitas

The 2018 Coupe du Faso is the 32nd edition of the Coupe du Faso (51st edition including earlier cup competitions), the knockout football competition of Burkina Faso.

== First round ==
[Mar 11]

Wend Panga FC o/w US Passoré [Wend Panga forfeited]

US BAM 1-3 Sané Sports de Poura

Santa Club de Niangologolo w/o Nalambou FC [Nalambou forfeited]

OSK 2-1 AFP

US Poni o/w Dori FC [Poni forfeited]

ES du Kadiogo 2-0 JEK FC

ASKO 0-2 ASPC Tenkodogo

USFRAN 0-0 Rahimo FC [2-4 pen]

== Second round ==
[Mar 28]

ASO 0-1 AS Maya

OSK 0-4 ASEC Koudougou

KOZAF w/o Kiko FC [Kiko forfeited]

BPS 0-1 AS Tema Bokin

EAZ 2-2 9 AC [4-2 pen]

CFFEB w/o FALEM [FALEM forfeited]

AFACB 0-0 ASPC Tenkodogo [5-4 pen]

Léopards St. Cam 3-0 Faso AC

IFFA Matroukou 0-0 ASK [4-1 pen]

Bafudji FC 6-1 Sané Sports de Poura

Canon du Sud 0-0 AS Douanes [4-5 pen]

Royal FC o/w US Dori [Royal forfeited]

JCB 0-1 AS ECO

Fabao Espoir 2-0 ES du Kadiogo

US Yatenga o/w Santa Club de Niangologolo [Yatenga forfeited]

US Passoré 0-1 Rahimo FC

== Third round ==
[Apr 4]

Bobo Sport 0-0 EFO [4-3 pen]

Santa Club Niangologolo 0-2 AS Police

ASEC Koudougou w/o Bafudji FC [Bafudji forfeited]

USFA 2-0 Fabao Espoir

RCB 2-1 Rahimo FC

Léopards St. Cam 1-0 AS ECO

CFFEB 1-2 ASFA Yennega

Santos FC 0-0 AFACB [5-4 pen]

USCO 1-2 USO

US Dori o/w AS Tema Bokin [Dori forfeited]

AS Douanes 1-2 EAZ

IFFA Matroukou 1-0 KOZAF

AS Maya 0-1 AS Sonabel

RCK 2-0 Ajeb

Salitas FC 1-0 Majestic SC

== Round of 16 ==
[Apr 15]

Santos FC 0-4 AS Sonabel

ASFB 0-0 EAZ [4-3 pen]

ASFA Yennega 1-0 AS Police

IFFA Matroukou 0-1 RCK

ASEC Koudougou 1-0 RCB

Salitas FC 1-0 AS Tema Bokin

USFA 3-1 Léopards St. Cam

USO 1-0 Bobo Sport

== Quarterfinals ==
[May 9]

ASFA Yennega 0-1 Salitas FC

ASEC Koudougou 1-1 AS Sonabel [3-4 pen]

ASFB 1-1 USFA [4-1 pen]

RCK 2-0 USO

== Semifinals ==
[May 16]

AS Sonabel 1-2 Salitas FC

ASFB 1-1 RCK [5-4 pen]

== Final ==
[May 27]

Salitas FC 2-0 ASFB

== See also ==
- 2017–18 Burkinabé Premier League
