= Abou Ouattara =

Burkinabé footballer (born 1999)

Personal information
- Full name: Ben Qadir Abou Ouattara
- Date of birth: 26 December 1999 (age 26)
- Place of birth: Bouaké, Ivory Coast
- Height: 1.76 m (5 ft 9 in)
- Position: Right winger

Team information
- Current team: Džiugas Telšiai
- Number: 70

Senior career*
| Years | Team | Apps | (Gls) |
| 2015–2016 | Salitas | | |
| 2016–2017 | Horoya AC | | |
| 2018–2019 | KV Mechelen | 1 | (0) |
| 2019 | → Lille B (loan) | 10 | (2) |
| 2019–2021 | Lille B | 14 | (3) |
| 2019 | Lille | 1 | (0) |
| 2020–2021 | → Vitória Guimarães (loan) | 11 | (1) |
| 2020–2021 | → Vitória Guimarães B (loan) | 2 | (0) |
| 2021 | → Amiens (loan) | 11 | (0) |
| 2021–2022 | Valenciennes | 16 | (0) |
| 2021–2022 | Valenciennes II | 3 | (1) |
| 2022–2025 | Sheriff Tiraspol | 18 | (4) |
| 2026– | Džiugas Telšiai | 2 | (0) |
| 2026 | → Atmosfera (loan) | 3 | (0) |
| 2026 | → Atmosfera B (loan) | 5 | (1) |

International career^{‡}
| 2018– | Burkina Faso | 9 | (0) |
- * Club domestic league appearances and goals as of 1 September 2026 ‡ National team caps and goals as of 14:18, 4 September 2019 (UTC)

Ben Qadir Abou Ouattara (born 26 December 1999) is a professional footballer who plays for TOPLYGA club Džiugas Telšiai as a right winger. Born in Côte d'Ivoire, he represents the Burkina Faso national team.

== Club career ==
He played for Salitas, Horoya AC and KV Mechelen. In January 2019 he moved on loan to Lille B for six months, with an option to buy.

On 22 July 2021, he signed a three-year contract with Ligue 2 club Valenciennes.

On 20 June 2022, Sheriff Tiraspol announced the signing of Ouattara.

On 18 March 2026, TOPLYGA club Džiugas Telšiai announced the signing of Ouattara, with Ouattara joining I Lyga club Atmosfera on loan for the first half of the 2026 season.

== International career ==
He made his international debut for Burkina Faso in 2018.
