= Mouhamed Diop (footballer) =

Senegalese footballer (born 2000)

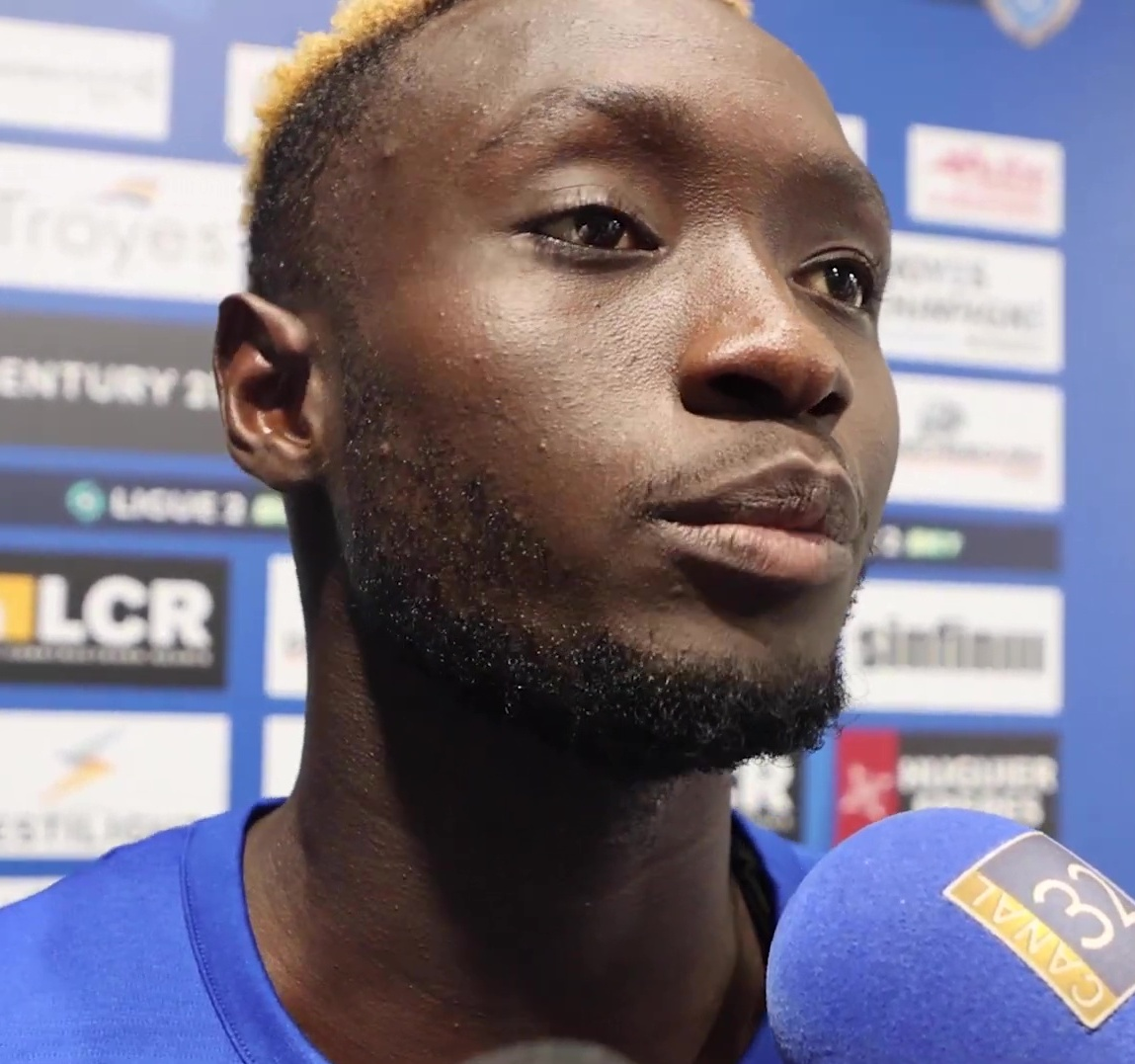

Personal information
- Date of birth: 30 September 2000 (age 26)
- Place of birth: Thiaroye, Senegal
- Height: 1.82 m (6 ft 0 in)
- Position: Midfielder

Team information
- Current team: Troyes
- Number: 8

Senior career*
Years	Team	Apps	(Gls)
2020–2021	AS Dakar Sacré-Cœur		
2021–2023	Kocaelispor	24	(3)
2022–2023	→ Sheriff Tiraspol (loan)	20	(4)
2023–	Troyes	95	(9)
- * Club domestic league appearances and goals as of 11 May 2026

Mouhamed Diop (born 30 September 2000) is a Senegalese professional footballer who plays as a midfielder for French club Troyes.

== Career ==
On 25 July 2022, he signed a contract with Moldovan Super Liga club Sheriff Tiraspol.
