= Nathanael Mbourou =

Gabonese footballer (born 1996)

Personal information
- Full name: Nathanael Bongo Mbourou
- Date of birth: 24 August 1996 (age 30)
- Place of birth: Lambaréné, Gabon
- Height: 1.78 m (5 ft 10 in)
- Position: Central midfielder

Team information
- Current team: FC Bălți
- Number: 6

Senior career*
Years	Team	Apps	(Gls)
2016–2019	CF Mounana		
2020	Maritzburg United	7	(0)
2021	Cape Town All Stars	5	(0)
2022	Dinamo-Auto	11	(0)
2023–	FC Bălți	18	(1)

International career^{‡}
2020–	Gabon	2	(0)
- * Club domestic league appearances and goals as of 13 October 2023 ‡ National team caps and goals as of 10 November 2022

Nathanael Bongo Mbourou (born 24 August 1996) is a Gabonese professional footballer who plays as a central midfielder for Moldovan club Bălți and the Gabon national team.
