= 2013–14 FC Sheriff Tiraspol season =

Sheriff Tiraspol
2013–14 season
- Chairman: Victor Gușan
- Manager: Veaceslav Rusnac
- Stadium: Sheriff Stadium
- Divizia Naţională: 1st
- Moldovan Cup: Runners-up
- Moldovan Super Cup: Winners
- Champions League: Third qualifying round
- Top goalscorer: League: Henrique Luvannor (26); All: Henrique Luvannor (28)
| Home colours | Away colours |

The 2013–14 season was FC Sheriff Tiraspol's 17th season, and their 16th in the Divizia Naţională, the top-flight of Moldovan football.

== Squad ==
As of match played 25 May 2014

| No. | Name | Nationality | Position | Date of birth (Age) | Signed from | Signed in | Contract ends | Apps. | Goals |
Goalkeepers
| 12 | Dmitri Stajila | (Moldova) | GK | 2 August 1991 (aged 22) | Trainee | 2007 | | | |
| 25 | Sergiu Juric | (Moldova) | GK | 3 March 1984 (aged 30) | Veris Chișinău | 2014 | | | |
Defenders
| 4 | Artiom Rozgoniuc | (Moldova) | DF | 1 October 1995 (aged 18) | Trainee | 2013 | | 2 | 0 |
| 6 | Melli | (Spain) | DF | 6 June 1984 (aged 29) | KAA Gent | 2013 | | 30 | 4 |
| 15 | Marcel Metoua | (Ivory Coast) | DF | 15 November 1988 (aged 25) | Banat Zrenjanin | 2011 | | 117 | 9 |
| 19 | Petar Lela | (Croatia) | DF | 17 March 1994 (aged 20) | Primorac 1929 | 2014 | | 1 | 0 |
| 22 | Djibril Paye | (Guinea) | DF | 26 February 1990 (aged 24) | | 2008 | | | |
| 26 | Miral Samardžić | (Slovenia) | DF | 17 February 1987 (aged 27) | Maribor | 2010 | | | |
Midfielders
| 7 | Valentin Furdui | (Moldova) | MF | 1 September 1987 (aged 26) | Milsami Orhei | 2013 | | 36 | 1 |
| 8 | Valentin Bîrdan | (Moldova) | MF | 13 May 1995 (aged 19) | Trainee | 2013 | | 20 | 1 |
| 11 | Ricardinho | (Brazil) | MF | 4 September 1989 (aged 24) | Lechia Gdańsk | 2013 | | 42 | 11 |
| 14 | Wilfried Balima | (Burkina Faso) | MF | 20 March 1985 (aged 29) | US Ouagadougou | 2005 | | | |
| 16 | Vadim Paireli | (Moldova) | MF | 8 November 1995 (aged 18) | Trainee | 2013 | | 35 | 2 |
| 20 | Cadú | (Brazil) | MF | 31 August 1986 (aged 27) | Red Star Belgrade | 2013 | | 38 | 9 |
| 21 | Kobi Moyal | (Israel) | MF | 12 June 1987 (aged 26) | Beitar Jerusalem | 2013 | | 23 | 1 |
| 23 | Ernandes | (Brazil) | MF | 11 November 1987 (aged 26) | Atlético Goianiense | 2014 | | 13 | 0 |
| 24 | Veaceslav Lisa | (Moldova) | MF | 24 May 1993 (aged 21) | Trainee | 2011 | | | |
| 28 | Dmitri Semirov | (Moldova) | MF | 27 December 1995 (aged 18) | Trainee | 2012 | | 1 | 0 |
| 33 | Valeriu Macrițchii | (Moldova) | MF | 13 February 1996 (aged 18) | Trainee | 2013 | | 12 | 1 |
| 88 | Marko Stanojević | (Serbia) | MF | 22 June 1988 (aged 25) | Rad | 2012 | | 74 | 5 |
Forwards
| 9 | Juninho Potiguar | (Brazil) | FW | 22 February 1990 (aged 24) | Icasa | 2014 | | 14 | 14 |
| 27 | Klysman | (Brazil) | FW | 10 September 1995 (aged 18) | | 2014 | | 1 | 0 |
| 29 | Ismail Isa | (Bulgaria) | FW | 26 June 1989 (aged 24) | Litex Lovech | 2013 | | 42 | 16 |
| 73 | Andrei Macrițchii | (Moldova) | FW | 13 February 1996 (aged 18) | Trainee | 2013 | | 1 | 0 |
| 89 | Artiom Puntus | (Moldova) | FW | 31 May 1995 (aged 18) | Trainee | 2013 | | 1 | 0 |
| 90 | Luvannor | (Moldova) | FW | 19 May 1990 (aged 24) | Morrinhos | 2011 | | 103 | 46 |
| 99 | Artiom Zabun | (Moldova) | FW | 23 April 1996 (aged 18) | Trainee | 2013 | | 1 | 0 |
Players away on loan
| | Georgi Georgiev | (Bulgaria) | GK | 12 October 1988 (aged 25) | Tiraspol | 2013 | | 0 | 0 |
| | Tomislav Pajović | (Serbia) | DF | 15 March 1986 (aged 28) | Rad | 2012 | | 9 | 1 |
| | Vadim Rață | (Moldova) | MF | 5 May 1993 (aged 21) | Trainee | 2010 | | 53 | 2 |
| | Igor Dima | (Moldova) | FW | 11 February 1993 (aged 21) | Trainee | 2010 | | 10 | 2 |
| | Marko Markovski | (Serbia) | FW | 26 May 1986 (aged 27) | Xanthi | 2013 | | 16 | 9 |
Left during the season
| 10 | Aleksandar Pešić | (Serbia) | FW | 21 May 1992 (aged 22) | OFI Crete | 2010 | | 74 | 26 |
| 17 | Alexandru Scripcenco | (Moldova) | DF | 13 January 1991 (aged 23) | Tiraspol | 2013 | | | |
| 19 | Fernando | (Brazil) | MF | 12 May 1986 (aged 28) | Volta Redonda | 2013 | | 17 | 5 |
| 23 | Alexandr Bolsacov | (Moldova) | DF | 19 November 1994 (aged 19) | Trainee | 2013 | | 9 | 0 |
| 33 | Willian Thuram | (Brazil) | MF | 25 May 1989 (aged 25) | Botafogo-PB | 2013 | | 14 | 0 |
| 77 | Vjekoslav Tomić | (Croatia) | GK | 19 July 1983 (aged 30) | Kardemir Karabükspor | 2013 | | 13 | 0 |
| 89 | Alexandru Pașcenco | (Moldova) | MF | 28 May 1989 (aged 24) | Rapid Ghidighici | 2012 | | | |
| 99 | Jhulliam | (Brazil) | FW | 4 April 1988 (aged 26) | Chã Grande | 2013 | | 23 | 13 |

== Transfers ==
=== In ===
| Date | Position | Nationality | Name | From | Fee | Ref. |
|---|---|---|---|---|---|---|
| 12 June 2013 | FW | (Bulgaria) | Ismail Isa | Litex Lovech | Undisclosed | |
| 17 June 2013 | MF | (Brazil) | Cadú | Red Star Belgrade | Undisclosed | |
| 18 June 2013 | GK | (Bulgaria) | Georgi Georgiev | Tiraspol | Undisclosed | |
| 18 June 2013 | DF | (Brazil) | Willian Thuram | Botafogo-PB | Undisclosed | |
| 25 June 2013 | MF | (Brazil) | Ricardinho | Lechia Gdańsk | Undisclosed | |
| 9 July 2013 | MF | (Brazil) | Fernando | Voltaço | Undisclosed | |
| 25 July 2013 | GK | (Croatia) | Vjekoslav Tomić | Kardemir Karabükspor | Undisclosed | |
| 25 July 2013 | FW | (Brazil) | Jhulliam | Chã Grande | Undisclosed | |
| 27 July 2013 | MF | (Moldova) | Valentin Furdui | Milsami Orhei | Undisclosed | |
| 15 August 2013 | MF | (Israel) | Kobi Moyal | Beitar Jerusalem | Undisclosed | |
| 28 August 2013 | DF | (Spain) | Melli | KAA Gent | Undisclosed | |
| 13 January 2014 | FW | (Brazil) | Juninho Potiguar | Icasa | Undisclosed | |
| 14 January 2014 | MF | (Brazil) | Ernandes | Atlético Goianiense | Undisclosed | |
| 4 February 2014 | FW | (Brazil) | Klysman | | | |
| 24 February 2014 | GK | (Moldova) | Sergiu Juric | Veris Chișinău | Undisclosed | |

=== Out ===
| Date | Position | Nationality | Name | To | Fee | Ref. |
|---|---|---|---|---|---|---|
| Summer 2013 | DF | (Poland) | Krzysztof Król | Piast Gliwice | Undisclosed | |
| Summer 2013 | DF | (Slovenia) | Tadej Apatič | Olimpija Ljubljana | Undisclosed | |

=== Loans out ===
| Date from | Position | Nationality | Name | To | Date to | Ref. |
|---|---|---|---|---|---|---|
| 20 June 2013 | GK | (Moldova) | Alexandru Zveaghințev | Tiraspol | 16 August 2013 | |
| 20 June 2013 | DF | (Moldova) | Artyom Khachaturov | Tiraspol | End of Season | |
| 20 June 2013 | MF | (Moldova) | Igor Poiarcov | Tiraspol | End of Season | |
| 20 June 2013 | MF | (Moldova) | Vadim Rață | Tiraspol | End of Season | |
| 15 August 2013 | GK | (Bulgaria) | Georgi Georgiev | Tiraspol | End of Season | |
| Summer 2013 | DF | (Serbia) | Tomislav Pajović | Hapoel Be'er Sheva | End of Season | |
| Summer 2013 | MF | (Moldova) | Igor Dima | Tiraspol | 18 February 2014 | |
| Summer 2013 | FW | (Serbia) | Marko Markovski | Bnei Sakhnin | Winter 2014 | |

=== Released ===
| Date | Position | Nationality | Name | Joined | Date |
|---|---|---|---|---|---|
| 20 June 2013 | MF | (Moldova) | Alexandru Onica | Lokomotiv Tashkent | |
| 15 August 2013 | FW | (Serbia) | Aleksandar Pešić | Jagodina | |
| 14 December 2013 | DF | (Brazil) | Willian Thuram | Juventude | |
| 14 December 2013 | MF | (Brazil) | Fernando | Bonsucesso | |
| 13 January 2014 | GK | (Croatia) | Vjekoslav Tomić | Khazar Lankaran | 13 January 2014 |
| 26 January 2014 | GK | (Moldova) | Alexandru Zveaghințev | Dinamo-Auto Tiraspol | |
| 18 February 2014 | MF | (Moldova) | Alexandru Pașcenco | Ararat Yerevan | |
| 27 February 2014 | DF | (Moldova) | Alexandru Scripcenco | Costuleni | |
| Winter 2014 | MF | (Serbia) | Saša Marjanović | Radnički Niš | |
| 25 May 2014 | MF | (Israel) | Kobi Moyal | Maccabi Haifa | |

== Competitions ==
=== Moldovan Super Cup ===
| 29 June 2013 | Sheriff Tiraspol | 2–0 | Tiraspol | Tiraspol |
| 20:00 EEST (UTC+3) | Isa 10'; Balima 59'; Luvannor (yellow card) 66'; Markovski (yellow card) 90' | Report | | Stadium: Sheriff Stadium; Attendance: 2,500; Referee: Serghei Derenov |

=== Divizia Națională ===
==== Results summary ====
| Overall | | | | | | | | Home | | | | | | Away | | | | | |
| Pld | W | D | L | GF | GA | GD | Pts | W | D | L | GF | GA | GD | W | D | L | GF | GA | GD |
|---|---|---|---|---|---|---|---|---|---|---|---|---|---|---|---|---|---|---|---|
| 0 | 0 | 0 | 0 | 0 | 0 | 0 | 0 | 0 | 0 | 0 | 0 | 0 | 0 | 0 | 0 | 0 | 0 | 0 | 0 |

Last updated: 10 December 2016.
Source: See Results

==== Results ====
| 27 July 2013 1 | Sheriff Tiraspol | 2–2 | Zimbru Chișinău | Tiraspol |
| 19:00 EEST (UTC+3) | Paireli (yellow card) 40'; Macrițchii (yellow card) 44'; Pešić (yellow card) 56'; Cadú (yellow card) 57'; Pașcenco (yellow card) 61'; Markovski 73' (yellow card) 90+2'; Isa 79' | Report | Cheptine 22' (yellow card) 50'; A.Dedov 49' (yellow card) 50'; Gafina (yellow card) 63' | Stadium: Sheriff Stadium; Attendance: 1,611; Referee: Serghei Derenov |

| 3 August 2013 2 | Veris Chișinău | 2–1 | Sheriff Tiraspol | Vadul lui Vodă |
| 17:00 EEST (UTC+3) | Frunză 3'; Cîrlan 62'; A.Santiago (yellow card) 66'; Cojocari (yellow card) 84'; M.Hovanschi (yellow card) 90+4' | Report | Jhulliam 45'; Scripcenco (yellow card) 50' (red card) 61' | Stadium: Stadionul CPSM; Attendance: 1,000; Referee: Gabriel Tupicico |

| 11 August 2013 3 | Sheriff Tiraspol | 2–0 | Rapid Ghidighici | Tiraspol |
| 19:00 EEST (UTC+3) | Thuram (yellow card) 21'; Cadú 78' (yellow card) 79'; Luvannor 90+2' | Report | Bogdan (yellow card) 54'; I.Arabadji (yellow card) 54' | Stadium: Sheriff Stadium; Attendance: 500; Referee: Alexandr Tean |

| 17 August 2013 4 | Olimpia Bălți | 0–5 | Sheriff Tiraspol | Bălți |
| 17:00 EEST (UTC+3) | Rogac (yellow card) 63' | Report | Furdui (yellow card) 9'; Metoua 26'; Luvannor 45', 59'; Pașcenco 54'; Ricardinho 87' (pen.) | Stadium: Stadionul Orășenesc; Attendance: 2,300; Referee: Victor Gheciu |

| 25 August 2013 5 | Sheriff Tiraspol | 4–1 | Costuleni | Tiraspol |
| 19:00 EEST (UTC+3) | Jhulliam 9'; Luvannor 30', 81'; Cadú 69' | Report | Ivanov (yellow card) 39'; Pîslă 48'; Ojog (yellow card) 49' | Stadium: Sheriff Stadium; Attendance: 500; Referee: Gabriel Tupicico |

| 2 September 2013 6 | Sheriff Tiraspol | 1–0 | Dacia Chișinău | Tiraspol |
| 18:00 EEST (UTC+3) | Samardžić 23'; Isa (yellow card) 45+1' | Report | Dragovozov (yellow card) 22'; Ilescu (yellow card) 45+1'; Jardan (yellow card) 72' | Stadium: Sheriff Stadium; Attendance: 700; Referee: Veaceslav Banari |

| 14 September 2013 7 | Academia Chișinău | 0–7 | Sheriff Tiraspol | Tiraspol |
| 18:00 EEST (UTC+3) | Y.Siniţchih (yellow card) 16'; D.Caţer (yellow card) 66' | Report | Ricardinho 6'; Luvannor 8'; Cadú 17'; Metoua 28'; Melli 76'; Jhulliam 78', 88' | Stadium: Malaya Sportivnaya Arena; Attendance: 250; Referee: Victor Bugenko |

| 22 September 2013 8 | Sheriff Tiraspol | 1–0 | Milsami Orhei | Tiraspol |
| 18:00 EEST (UTC+3) | Moyal (yellow card) 24'; Luvannor 56'; Fernando (yellow card) 88' | Report | | Stadium: Sheriff Stadium; Attendance: 500; Referee: Serghei Derenov |

| 25 September 2013 9 | Speranța Crihana Veche | 0–5 | Sheriff Tiraspol | Tiraspol |
| 18:00 EEST (UTC+3) | | Report | Jhulliam 11', 44', 66'; Cadú 53'; Metoua 69' | Stadium: Sheriff Stadium; Attendance: 200; Referee: Andrei Ceban |

| 29 September 2013 10 | Sheriff Tiraspol | 3–0 | Dinamo-Auto Tiraspol | Tiraspol |
| 18:00 EEST (UTC+3) | Cadú 50' (pen.), 83'; Luvannor 79' | Report | | Stadium: Sheriff Stadium; Attendance: 500; Referee: Dmitrii Muntean |

| 7 October 2013 11 | Tiraspol | 0–3 | Sheriff Tiraspol | Tiraspol |
| 17:00 EEST (UTC+3) | Grosu (yellow card) 25' | Report | Luvannor 2', 45'; Moyal (yellow card) 36'; Isa 90+2' | Stadium: Sheriff Stadium; Attendance: 450; Referee: Petru Stoianov |

| 19 October 2013 12 | Zimbru Chișinău | 1–1 | Sheriff Tiraspol | Chișinău |
| 17:00 EEST (UTC+3) | Cheptine 11'; Wellington (yellow card) 40'; Bogdan (yellow card) 75' (yellow-red card) 86'; Calancea (yellow card) 90+3' | Report | Paye (yellow card) 28'; Luvannor 40'; Paireli (yellow card) 64' | Stadium: Zimbru Stadium; Attendance: 4,500; Referee: Veaceslav Banari |

| 27 October 2013 13 | Sheriff Tiraspol | 3–0 | Veris Chișinău | Tiraspol |
| 17:00 EET (UTC+2) | Fernando 32'; Furdui (yellow card) 42'; Luvannor 45+2' (yellow card) 56'; Metoua (yellow card) 54'; Ricardinho 67' | Report | Seul (yellow card) 33'; Racu (yellow card) 39'; Frunză (yellow card) 56' | Stadium: Sheriff Stadium; Attendance: 700; Referee: Alexandr Tean |

| 2 November 2013 14 | Rapid Ghidighici | 2–3 | Sheriff Tiraspol | Ghidighici |
| 14:00 EET (UTC+2) | Livandovschi 19'; D.Bacal 26'; I.Durbală (yellow card) 76' | Report | Luvannor 14'; Melli (yellow card) 35'; Fernando 38'; Samardžić (yellow card) 45'; Isa 84'; Paireli (yellow card) 87' | Stadium: Ghidighici Stadium; Attendance: 300; Referee: Serghei Derenov |

| 10 November 2013 15 | Sheriff Tiraspol | 3–0 | Olimpia Bălți | Tiraspol |
| 17:00 EET (UTC+2) | Lisa 32'; Melli 42'; Samardžić (yellow card) 51'; Furdui (yellow card) 64'; Luvannor 86' | Report | M.Golban (yellow card) 62'; Cheptenari (yellow card) 66'; Mudrac (yellow card) 67' | Stadium: Sheriff Stadium; Attendance: 250; Referee: Gabriel Tupicico |

| 23 November 2013 16 | Costuleni | 0–1 | Sheriff Tiraspol | Tiraspol |
| 17:00 EET (UTC+2) | I.Carandaşov (yellow card) 19'; V.Negru (yellow card) 87' | Report | Luvannor 34' | Stadium: Sheriff Stadium; Attendance: 200; Referee: Gheorghe Malinovschii |

| 1 December 2013 17 | Dacia Chișinău | 1–3 | Sheriff Tiraspol | Chișinău |
| 13:00 EET (UTC+2) | Mamah (yellow card) 55'; Bejan (yellow card) 61' (goal) 69'; Stoleru (yellow card) 79' | Report | Ricardinho 18'; Furdui (yellow card) 34'; Paireli 75'; Isa 82' | Stadium: Joma Arena; Attendance: 1,000; Referee: Petru Stoianov |

| 4 December 2013 18 | Sheriff Tiraspol | 8–0 | Academia Chișinău | Tiraspol |
| 17:00 EET (UTC+2) | Luvannor 10', 18', 42'; Jhulliam 24', 26', 45', 55'; Moyal (yellow card) 40'; Lisa (yellow card) 88' | Report | Vremea (yellow card) 50'; I.Tarasov (yellow card) 54' | Stadium: Sheriff Stadium; Attendance: 150; Referee: Victor Gheciu |

| 8 December 2013 19 | Milsami Orhei | 1–2 | Sheriff Tiraspol | Orhei |
| 13:00 EET (UTC+2) | Rassulov (yellow card) 34'; Guilherme (yellow card) 90+2' | Report | Isa 10', 15' | Stadium: CSR Orhei; Attendance: 500; Referee: Vladislav Ivancenco |

| 28 February 2014 20 | Sheriff Tiraspol | 1–0 | Speranța Crihana Veche | Tiraspol |
| 16:00 EET (UTC+2) | Stanojević (yellow card) 13'; Ricardinho 53'; Isa (yellow card) 73' | Report | V.Potlog (yellow card) 55'; V.Sofroni (yellow card) 59'; Onofrei (yellow card) 82' | Stadium: Sheriff Stadium; Attendance: 650; Referee: Andrei Ceban |

| 8 March 2014 21 | Dinamo-Auto Tiraspol | 0–6 | Sheriff Tiraspol | Tiraspol |
| 13:00 EET (UTC+2) | V.Oleinic (yellow card) 17'; Mudrac (yellow card) 47'; Iurcu (yellow card) 75' | Report | Isa 7', 60'; Luvannor 35'; Ricardinho 49'; Potiguar 76'; Jhulliam 87' (pen.) | Stadium: Krytyj futbolnyj Manesh; Attendance: 450; Referee: Iurie Covtun |

| 15 March 2014 22 | Sheriff Tiraspol | 1–2 | Tiraspol | Tiraspol |
| 17:00 EET (UTC+2) | Luvannor 41' (yellow card) 57' | Report | Shapoval 3' (pen.); Grosu (yellow card) 84'; Karaneychev 85' (yellow card) 90'; L.Japaridze (yellow card) 87' | Stadium: Krytyj futbolnyj Manesh; Attendance: 700; Referee: Alexander Tean |

| 21 March 2014 23 | Sheriff Tiraspol | 2–1 | Zimbru Chișinău | Tiraspol |
| 17:00 EET (UTC+2) | Luvannor 33' (yellow card) 60'; Paireli (yellow card) 43'; Ricardinho 45' | Report | Gînsari 27'; I.Jardan (yellow card) 40'; Pavlyuchek (yellow card) 62'; Anton (yellow card) 67'; Amani (yellow card) 83' | Stadium: Krytyj futbolnyj Manesh; Attendance: 1,500; Referee: Vladislav Ivancenco |

| 30 March 2014 24 | Dinamo-Auto Tiraspol | 1–4 | Sheriff Tiraspol | Ternovca |
| 15:00 EEST (UTC+3) | S.Ciuico 5'; Diulgher (yellow card) 62'; A.Jularji (yellow card) 68'; N.Rudac (yellow card) 85' | Report | Luvannor 56', 57' (yellow card) 82'; Potiguar 74'; Bîrdan 81'; Macrițchii (yellow card) 82' | Stadium: Teren Sintetic Ternovca; Attendance: 400; Referee: Andrei Ceban |

| 3 April 2014 25 | Sheriff Tiraspol | 3–0 | Rapid Ghidighici | Tiraspol |
| EEST (UTC+3) | | Report | | Stadium: Sheriff Stadium |
Note: Match awarded 3–0 by the Moldovan Football Federation.

| 7 April 2014 26 | Olimpia Bălți | 0–5 | Sheriff Tiraspol | Bălți |
| 17:00 EEST (UTC+3) | I.Bodean (yellow card) 26'; Grijuc (yellow card) 67'; I.Dombrovschii (yellow card) 75'; Grab (yellow card) 84' | Report | Luvannor 5', 58'; Isa 6', 10'; Potiguar (yellow card) 70'; Ricardinho 80' | Stadium: Stadionul Orășenesc; Attendance: 700; Referee: Victor Gheciu |

| 11 April 2014 27 | Sheriff Tiraspol | 4–1 | Academia Chișinău | Tiraspol |
| 17:00 EEST (UTC+3) | Isa 9'; Luvannor 20'; Furdui 32'; Paye (yellow card) 56'; Potiguar 80' | Report | Apostol (yellow card) 45'; Focșa (yellow card) 49'; D.Caţer (yellow card) 54'; Calincov 83' | Stadium: Sheriff Stadium; Attendance: 700; Referee: Victor Bugenko |

| 19 April 2014 28 | Speranța Crihana Veche | 0–6 | Sheriff Tiraspol | Tiraspol |
| 17:00 EEST (UTC+3) | A.Mardari (yellow card) 42'; Caraulan (yellow card) 51'; V.Potlog (yellow card) 58'; N.Semcov (yellow card) 59'; Boghiu (yellow card) 61'; A.Apostol (yellow card) 79' | Report | Potiguar 12', 28'; Ernandes (yellow card) 47'; Melli 62'; Lisa 74', 88'; Paireli 86' | Stadium: Sheriff Stadium; Attendance: 500; Referee: Gabriel Tupicico |

| 25 April 2014 29 | Sheriff Tiraspol | 2–0 | Milsami Orhei | Tiraspol |
| 18:00 EEST (UTC+3) | Potiguar 31'; Cadú 57' (pen.) | Report | A.Stadiiciuc (yellow card) 57'; Gheorghiu (red card) 69'; Rhaili (yellow card) 69' | Stadium: Sheriff Stadium; Attendance: 800; Referee: Vladislav Ivancenco |

| 3 May 2014 30 | Costuleni | 0–2 | Sheriff Tiraspol | Orhei |
| 17:00 EEST (UTC+3) | Ojog (yellow card) 71' | Report | Ricardinho (yellow card) 57'; Furdui (yellow card) 72'; Potiguar 76', 81' | Stadium: CSR Orhei; Attendance: 400; Referee: Vadim Dedeniov |

| 11 May 2014 31 | Sheriff Tiraspol | 0–0 | Veris Chișinău | Tiraspol |
| 18:00 EEST (UTC+3) | Paireli (yellow card) 15' | Report | Racu (yellow card) 43'; Antoniuc (yellow card) 65'; Cașcaval (yellow card) 85' | Stadium: Sheriff Stadium; Attendance: 1,500; Referee: Serghei Derenov |

| 16 May 2014 32 | Dacia Chișinău | 2–3 | Sheriff Tiraspol | Speia |
| 18:00 EEST (UTC+3) | Posmac (yellow card) 15'; Knežević 28'; Mamah (yellow card) 33'; Mihaliov 38'; Soppo (yellow card) 46'; Barakhoyev (yellow card) 49' | Report | Potiguar 13' (yellow card) 40'; Macrițchii (yellow card) 34' (goal) 77'; Balima 53'; Ernandes (yellow card) 64'; Paireli (yellow card) 75' (yellow-red card) 83' | Stadium: Stadionul Moldova; Attendance: 300; Referee: Gabriel Tupicico |

| 21 May 2014 33 | Sheriff Tiraspol | 1–0 | Tiraspol | Tiraspol |
| 18:00 EEST (UTC+3) | Stanojević (yellow card) 14'; Macrițchii (yellow card) 55'; Lisa 66' | Report | | Stadium: Sheriff Stadium; Attendance: 1,300; Referee: Victor Gheciu |

==== League table ====
| Pos | Team | Pld | W | D | L | GF | GA | GD | Pts | Qualification or relegation |
|---|---|---|---|---|---|---|---|---|---|---|
| 1 | Sheriff Tiraspol (C) | 33 | 28 | 3 | 2 | 98 | 16 | +82 | 87 | Qualification for the Champions League second qualifying round |
| 2 | Tiraspol | 33 | 21 | 9 | 3 | 60 | 27 | +33 | 72 | Qualification for the Europa League first qualifying round (Note: Zimbru Chișinău have qualified for the first qualifying round of the 2014–15 UEFA Europa League as winners of the 2013–14 Moldovan Cup.) |
| 3 | Veris Chișinău | 33 | 21 | 8 | 4 | 74 | 25 | +49 | 71 | Qualification for the Europa League first qualifying round |
| 4 | Zimbru Chișinău | 33 | 18 | 7 | 8 | 56 | 24 | +32 | 61 (Note: ZIM: 7pts; DAC: 1pt) | Qualification for the Europa League first qualifying round |
| 5 | Dacia Chișinău | 33 | 18 | 7 | 8 | 68 | 29 | +39 | 61 | |

Source: Moldovan Football Federation (in Romanian)
Rules for classification: 1st points; 2nd head-to-head points; 3rd head-to-head goal difference; 4th head-to-head goals scored; 5th goal difference; 6th number of goals scored; 7th Fair Play competition
(C) Champions

=== Moldovan Cup ===
| 25 March 2014 Third Round | Sheriff Tiraspol | 4–0 | Olimpia Bălți | Tiraspol |
| 18:00 EET (UTC+2) | Luvannor 40'; Ricardinho 69'; Potiguar 71'; Melli 85' | Report | | Stadium: Sheriff Stadium; Referee: Veaceslav Banari |

| 15 April 2014 Quarterfinal | Sheriff Tiraspol | 2–1 | Veris | Tiraspol |
| 17:00 EEST (UTC+3) | Luvannor (yellow card) 20'; Bîrdan (yellow card) 25'; Potiguar 74', 90+4' | Report | Frunză (yellow card) 30'; Milinceanu 89' | Stadium: Sheriff Stadium; Attendance: 300; Referee: Victor Gheciu |

| 7 May 2014 Semifinal | Milsami Orhei | 0–2 | Sheriff Tiraspol | Orhei |
| 17:00 EEST (UTC+3) | Iavorschi (yellow card) 62'; Pătraș (yellow card) 80'; Rhaili (yellow card) 90+4' | Report | Stanojević 17'; Furdui (yellow card) 23'; Potiguar 69'; Juric (yellow card) 80' | Stadium: CSR Orhei; Attendance: 2,500; Referee: Petru Stoianov |

| 25 May 2014 Final | Sheriff Tiraspol | 1–3 | Zimbru Chişinău | Chișinău |
| 20:00 EEST (UTC+3) | Samardžić (yellow card) 20'; Luvannor (red card) 22'; Potiguar 59' (yellow card) 73' | Report | Amani (yellow card) 34'; Spătaru (yellow card) 43' (goal) 50'; A.Dedov (yellow card) 58'; Stanojević 65' (o.g.); Erhan 77' | Stadium: Zimbru Stadium; Attendance: 8,500; Referee: Danny Makkelie |

=== UEFA Champions League ===
==== Qualifying Rounds ====
| 16 July 2013 Second qualifying round 1st leg | Sheriff Tiraspol (Moldova) | 1–1 | (Montenegro) Sutjeska Nikšić | Tiraspol, Moldova |
| 20:00 EEST (UTC+3) | Metoua (yellow card) 18'; Luvannor 45' | Report | Karadžić (yellow card) 23'; Pejović 54'; Ognjanović (yellow card) 76'; Janjušević (yellow card) 83'; Nikolić (yellow card) 90+2' | Stadium: Sheriff Stadium; Attendance: 6,153; Referee: Bülent Yıldırım (Turkey) |

| 23 July 2013 Second qualifying round 2nd leg | Sutjeska Nikšić (Montenegro) | 0–5 (1–6 agg.) | (Moldova) Sheriff Tiraspol | Nikšić, Montenegro |
| 18:30 EEST (UTC+3) | Bečelić (red card) 69' | Report | Cadú 14' (yellow card) 38'; Ricardinho 47'; Fernando 52', 65'; Scripcenco 86' | Stadium: Gradski Stadion; Attendance: 5,100; Referee: Vladimir Kazmenko (Russia) |

| 30 July 2013 Third qualifying round 1st leg | Dinamo Zagreb (Croatia) | 1–0 | (Moldova) Sheriff Tiraspol | Zagreb, Croatia |
| 21:45 EEST (UTC+3) | Čop (yellow card) 45+1'; Saré (yellow card) 86'; Rukavina 89' | Report | Samardžić (yellow card) 22'; Fernando (yellow card) 45+1' | Stadium: Stadion Maksimir; Attendance: 10,347; Referee: Carlos Clos Gómez (Spain) |

| 7 August 2013 Third qualifying round 2nd leg | Sheriff Tiraspol (Moldova) | 0–3 (0–4 agg.) | (Croatia) Dinamo Zagreb | Tiraspol, Moldova |
| 20:00 EEST (UTC+3) | Cadú (yellow card) 30'; Luvannor (yellow card) 40'; Thuram (yellow card) 78'; Fernando (yellow card) 80' | Report | Fernandes 10'; Soudani 27'; Čop 61' | Stadium: Sheriff Stadium; Attendance: 10,234; Referee: Danny Makkelie (Netherlands) |

=== UEFA Europa League ===
==== Qualifying Rounds ====
| 22 August 2013 Play-off round 1st leg | Vojvodina (Serbia) | 1–1 | (Moldova) Sheriff Tiraspol | Novi Sad, Serbia |
| 21:30 EEST (UTC+3) | Leković (yellow card) 28'; Škuletić 54'; Vranješ (yellow card) 70'; Đurić (yellow card) 82' | Report | Cadú (yellow card) 28'; Luvannor (yellow card) 31' (yellow-red card) 42'; Isa 36' (yellow card) 76'; Paye (yellow card) 53'; Tomić (yellow card) 69'; Jhulliam (yellow card) 90+3' | Stadium: Karađorđe Stadium; Attendance: 11,000; Referee: Robert Schörgenhofer (Austria) |

| 29 August 2013 Play-off round 2nd leg | Sheriff Tiraspol (Moldova) | 2–1 (3–2 agg.) | (Serbia) Vojvodina | Tiraspol, Moldova |
| 20:00 EEST (UTC+3) | Ricardinho (yellow card) 42'; Jhulliam 59'; Fernando 67'; Isa (yellow card) 68'; Moyal (yellow card) 73'; Balima (yellow card) 90+5' | Report | Poletanović (yellow card) 32'; Radoja (yellow card) 37'; Leković 90' | Stadium: Sheriff Stadium; Attendance: 6,839; Referee: Tony Chapron (France) |

==== Group stage ====
| Pos | Team | Pld | W | D | L | GF | GA | GD | Pts | Qualification | TOT | ANZ | SHE | TRO |
|---|---|---|---|---|---|---|---|---|---|---|---|---|---|---|
| 1 | (England) Tottenham Hotspur | 6 | 6 | 0 | 0 | 15 | 2 | +13 | 18 | Advance to knockout phase | — | 4–1 | 2–1 | 3–0 |
| 2 | (Russia) Anzhi Makhachkala | 6 | 2 | 2 | 2 | 4 | 7 | −3 | 8 | Advance to knockout phase | 0–2 | — | 1–1 | 1–0 |
| 3 | (Moldova) Sheriff Tiraspol | 6 | 1 | 3 | 2 | 5 | 6 | −1 | 6 | | 0–2 | 0–0 | — | 2–0 |
| 4 | (Norway) Tromsø | 6 | 0 | 1 | 5 | 1 | 10 | −9 | 1 | | 0–2 | 0–1 | 1–1 | — |

Source: Soccerway

| 19 September 2013 1 | Sheriff Tiraspol (Moldova) | 0–0 | (Russia) Anzhi Makhachkala | Tiraspol, Moldova |
| 22:05 EEST (UTC+3) | Paye (yellow card) 40' | Report | Agalarov (yellow card) 37'; Solomatin (yellow card) 85'; Adeleye (yellow card) 90'; Jucilei (yellow card) 90+4' | Stadium: Sheriff Stadium; Attendance: 8,882; Referee: Alan Kelly (Ireland) |

| 3 October 2013 2 | Tromsø (Norway) | 1–1 | (Moldova) Sheriff Tiraspol | Tromsø, Norway |
| 20:00 EEST (UTC+3) | Helmke (yellow card) 17'; Fojut (yellow card) 47'; Ondrášek 65' (yellow card) 84' | Report | Moyal (yellow card) 29'; Ricardinho (yellow card) 61' (goal) 87'; Melli (red card) 73' | Stadium: Alfheim Stadion; Attendance: 3,710; Referee: Simon Lee Evans (Wales) |

| 24 October 2013 3 | Sheriff Tiraspol (Moldova) | 0–2 | (England) Tottenham Hotspur | Tiraspol, Moldova |
| 20:00 EEST (UTC+3) | Moyal (yellow card) 60' | Report | Vertonghen 12'; Chiricheș (yellow card) 45+1'; Defoe 75' | Stadium: Sheriff Stadium; Attendance: 11,725; Referee: Liran Liany (Israel) |

| 7 November 2013 4 | Tottenham Hotspur (England) | 2–1 | (Moldova) Sheriff Tiraspol | London, England |
| 21EET (UTC+2) | Eriksen (yellow card) 52'; Lamela 60'; Defoe 67' (pen.) | Report | Isa 72' | Stadium: White Hart Lane; Attendance: 32,225; Referee: Kenn Hansen (Denmark) |

| 28 November 2013 5 | Anzhi Makhachkala (Russia) | 1–1 | (Moldova) Sheriff Tiraspol | Ramenskoye, Russia |
| 19:00 EET (UTC+2) | Epureanu 58'; Ahmedov (yellow card) 66'; Agalarov (yellow card) 69'; Adeleye (yellow card) 85' | Report | Luvannor (yellow card) 46'; Isa 52' (yellow card) 53'; Ricardinho (yellow card) 89' (yellow-red card) 90+3' | Stadium: Saturn Stadium; Attendance: 2,760; Referee: Libor Kovařík (Czech Republic) |
Note: Anzhi Makhachkala played their home matches at Saturn Stadium, Ramenskoye instead of their regular stadium, Anzhi-Arena, Makhachkala.

| 12 December 2013 6 | Sheriff Tiraspol (Moldova) | 2–0 | (Norway) Tromsø | Tiraspol, Moldova |
| 22:05 EET (UTC+2) | Cadú 4'; Isa 36'; Luvannor (yellow card) 43' | Report | Drage (yellow card) 87' | Stadium: Sheriff Stadium; Attendance: 1,211; Referee: Sébastien Delferiere (Belgium) |

== Squad statistics ==
As of Match played 25 May 2014

=== Appearances and goals ===
| No. | Pos | Nat | Player | Total | | Divizia Națională | | Moldovan Cup | | Moldovan Super Cup | | Champions League | | Europa League | |
| No. | Pos | Nat | Player | Apps | Goals | Apps | Goals | Apps | Goals | Apps | Goals | Apps | Goals | Apps | Goals |
|---|---|---|---|---|---|---|---|---|---|---|---|---|---|---|---|
| 4 | DF | (Moldova) MDA | Artiom Rozgoniuc | 1 | 0 | 0+1 | 0 | 0 | 0 | 0 | 0 | 0 | 0 | 0 | 0 |
| 6 | DF | (Spain) ESP | Melli | 30 | 4 | 23 | 3 | 3+1 | 1 | 0 | 0 | 0 | 0 | 3 | 0 |
| 7 | MF | (Moldova) MDA | Valentin Furdui | 36 | 1 | 29 | 1 | 3 | 0 | 0 | 0 | 0 | 0 | 1+3 | 0 |
| 8 | MF | (Moldova) MDA | Valentin Bîrdan | 19 | 1 | 6+11 | 1 | 2 | 0 | 0 | 0 | 0 | 0 | 0 | 0 |
| 9 | FW | (Brazil) BRA | Juninho Potiguar | 14 | 14 | 3+7 | 9 | 2+2 | 5 | 0 | 0 | 0 | 0 | 0 | 0 |
| 11 | MF | (Brazil) BRA | Ricardinho | 42 | 11 | 20+8 | 8 | 2+1 | 1 | 0 | 0 | 4 | 1 | 7 | 1 |
| 12 | GK | (Moldova) MDA | Dmitri Stajila | 28 | 0 | 22+1 | 0 | 1 | 0 | 1 | 0 | 2 | 0 | 0+1 | 0 |
| 14 | DF | (Burkina Faso) BFA | Wilfried Balima | 35 | 2 | 15+6 | 1 | 3+1 | 0 | 1 | 1 | 0+1 | 0 | 7+1 | 0 |
| 15 | DF | (Ivory Coast) CIV | Marcel Metoua | 43 | 3 | 26+1 | 3 | 3 | 0 | 1 | 0 | 4 | 0 | 8 | 0 |
| 16 | MF | (Moldova) MDA | Vadim Paireli | 33 | 2 | 18+9 | 2 | 3+1 | 0 | 0 | 0 | 0 | 0 | 0+2 | 0 |
| 19 | DF | (Croatia) CRO | Petar Lela | 1 | 0 | 1 | 0 | 0 | 0 | 0 | 0 | 0 | 0 | 0 | 0 |
| 20 | MF | (Brazil) BRA | Cadú | 38 | 9 | 18+5 | 7 | 2+1 | 0 | 0+1 | 0 | 4 | 1 | 7 | 1 |
| 21 | MF | (Israel) ISR | Kobi Moyal | 23 | 1 | 9+4 | 1 | 0+2 | 0 | 0 | 0 | 0 | 0 | 8 | 0 |
| 22 | DF | (Guinea) GUI | Djibril Paye | 38 | 0 | 22+1 | 0 | 2 | 0 | 1 | 0 | 4 | 0 | 8 | 0 |
| 23 | MF | (Brazil) BRA | Ernandes | 13 | 0 | 6+3 | 0 | 4 | 0 | 0 | 0 | 0 | 0 | 0 | 0 |
| 24 | MF | (Moldova) MDA | Veaceslav Lisa | 11 | 4 | 4+5 | 4 | 0+1 | 0 | 0+1 | 0 | 0 | 0 | 0 | 0 |
| 25 | GK | (Moldova) MDA | Sergiu Juric | 11 | 0 | 8 | 0 | 3 | 0 | 0 | 0 | 0 | 0 | 0 | 0 |
| 26 | DF | (Slovenia) SLO | Miral Samardžić | 40 | 1 | 24 | 1 | 3 | 0 | 1 | 0 | 4 | 0 | 8 | 0 |
| 27 | FW | (Brazil) BRA | Klysman | 1 | 0 | 1 | 0 | 0 | 0 | 0 | 0 | 0 | 0 | 0 | 0 |
| 28 | MF | (Moldova) MDA | Dmitri Semirov | 1 | 0 | 0+1 | 0 | 0 | 0 | 0 | 0 | 0 | 0 | 0 | 0 |
| 29 | FW | (Bulgaria) BUL | Ismail Isa | 42 | 16 | 17+9 | 11 | 2+1 | 0 | 1 | 1 | 1+3 | 0 | 7+1 | 4 |
| 33 | MF | (Moldova) MDA | Valeriu Macrițchii | 9 | 1 | 6 | 1 | 0+2 | 0 | 1 | 0 | 0 | 0 | 0 | 0 |
| 88 | MF | (Serbia) SRB | Marko Stanojević | 36 | 1 | 15+9 | 0 | 2+1 | 1 | 1 | 0 | 4 | 0 | 3+1 | 0 |
| 89 | FW | (Moldova) MDA | Artiom Puntus | 1 | 0 | 0+1 | 0 | 0 | 0 | 0 | 0 | 0 | 0 | 0 | 0 |
| 90 | FW | (Moldova) MDA | Luvannor | 43 | 28 | 25+2 | 26 | 4 | 1 | 1 | 0 | 4 | 1 | 7 | 0 |
| 99 | FW | (Moldova) MDA | Artiom Zabun | 1 | 0 | 0+1 | 0 | 0 | 0 | 0 | 0 | 0 | 0 | 0 | 0 |
Players away on loan:
| 9 | FW | (Serbia) SRB | Marko Markovski | 5 | 1 | 1+1 | 1 | 0 | 0 | 0+1 | 0 | 2 | 0 | 0 | 0 |
| 89 | MF | (Moldova) MDA | Igor Dima | 1 | 0 | 0+1 | 0 | 0 | 0 | 0 | 0 | 0 | 0 | 0 | 0 |
Players who left Sheriff Tiraspol during the season:
| 10 | FW | (Serbia) SRB | Aleksandar Pešić | 4 | 0 | 0+1 | 0 | 0 | 0 | 0 | 0 | 0+3 | 0 | 0 | 0 |
| 17 | DF | (Moldova) MDA | Alexandru Scripcenco | 6 | 1 | 2+2 | 0 | 0 | 0 | 1 | 0 | 0+1 | 1 | 0 | 0 |
| 19 | MF | (Brazil) BRA | Fernando | 17 | 5 | 4+4 | 2 | 0 | 0 | 0 | 0 | 4 | 2 | 3+2 | 1 |
| 23 | DF | (Moldova) MDA | Alexandr Bolsacov | 8 | 0 | 5+2 | 0 | 0 | 0 | 0 | 0 | 0 | 0 | 0+1 | 0 |
| 33 | DF | (Brazil) BRA | Willian Thuram | 14 | 0 | 4+3 | 0 | 0 | 0 | 0 | 0 | 4 | 0 | 1+2 | 0 |
| 77 | GK | (Croatia) CRO | Vjekoslav Tomić | 13 | 0 | 2+1 | 0 | 0 | 0 | 0 | 0 | 2 | 0 | 8 | 0 |
| 89 | MF | (Moldova) MDA | Alexandru Pașcenco | 24 | 1 | 9+6 | 1 | 0 | 0 | 1 | 0 | 0+4 | 0 | 0+4 | 0 |
| 99 | FW | (Brazil) BRA | Jhulliam | 23 | 13 | 7+9 | 12 | 0+1 | 0 | 0 | 0 | 1 | 0 | 2+3 | 1 |

=== Goal scorers ===
| Place | Position | Nation | Number | Name | Divizia Națională | Moldovan Cup | Moldovan Super Cup | Champions League | Europa League | Total |
|---|---|---|---|---|---|---|---|---|---|---|
| 1 | FW | (Moldova) | 90 | Luvannor | 26 | 1 | 0 | 1 | 0 | 28 |
| 2 | FW | (Bulgaria) | 29 | Ismail Isa | 11 | 0 | 1 | 0 | 4 | 16 |
| 3 | FW | (Brazil) | 9 | Juninho Potiguar | 9 | 5 | 0 | 0 | 0 | 14 |
| 4 | FW | (Brazil) | 99 | Jhulliam | 12 | 0 | 0 | 0 | 1 | 13 |
| 5 | MF | (Brazil) | 11 | Ricardinho | 8 | 1 | 0 | 1 | 1 | 11 |
| 6 | MF | (Brazil) | 20 | Cadú | 7 | 0 | 0 | 1 | 1 | 9 |
| 7 | MF | (Brazil) | 19 | Fernando | 2 | 0 | 0 | 2 | 1 | 5 |
| 8 | MF | (Moldova) | 24 | Veaceslav Lisa | 4 | 0 | 0 | 0 | 0 | 4 |
| 8 | DF | (Spain) | 6 | Melli | 3 | 1 | 0 | 0 | 0 | 4 |
| 10 | DF | (Ivory Coast) | 15 | Marcel Metoua | 3 | 0 | 0 | 0 | 0 | 3 |
| 11 | DF | (Moldova) | 16 | Vadim Paireli | 2 | 0 | 0 | 0 | 0 | 2 |
| 11 | DF | (Burkina Faso) | 14 | Wilfried Balima | 1 | 0 | 1 | 0 | 0 | 2 |
| 13 | DF | (Slovenia) | 26 | Miral Samardžić | 1 | 0 | 0 | 0 | 0 | 1 |
| 13 | MF | (Moldova) | 33 | Valeriu Macrițchii | 1 | 0 | 0 | 0 | 0 | 1 |
| 13 | MF | (Moldova) | 7 | Valentin Furdui | 1 | 0 | 0 | 0 | 0 | 1 |
| 13 | MF | (Moldova) | 8 | Valentin Bîrdan | 1 | 0 | 0 | 0 | 0 | 1 |
| 13 | MF | (Israel) | 21 | Kobi Moyal | 1 | 0 | 0 | 0 | 0 | 1 |
| 13 | MF | (Moldova) | 89 | Alexandru Pașcenco | 1 | 0 | 0 | 0 | 0 | 1 |
| 13 | FW | (Serbia) | 9 | Marko Markovski | 1 | 0 | 0 | 0 | 0 | 1 |
| 13 | MF | (Serbia) | 88 | Marko Stanojević | 0 | 1 | 0 | 0 | 0 | 1 |
| 13 | DF | (Moldova) | 17 | Alexandru Scripcenco | 0 | 0 | 0 | 1 | 0 | 1 |
| | | | | Awarded Goals | 3 | 0 | 0 | 0 | 0 | 3 |
| | | | | TOTALS | 98 | 9 | 2 | 6 | 8 | 123 |

=== Disciplinary record ===
| Number | Nation | Position | Name | Divizia Națională | | Moldovan Cup | | Moldovan Super Cup | | Champions League | | Europa League | | Total | |
| Number | Nation | Position | Name | Yellow card | Red card | Yellow card | Red card | Yellow card | Red card | Yellow card | Red card | Yellow card | Red card | Yellow card | Red card |
| 6 | (Spain) | DF | Melli | 1 | 0 | 0 | 0 | 0 | 0 | 0 | 0 | 0 | 1 | 1 | 1 |
| 7 | (Moldova) | MF | Valentin Furdui | 5 | 0 | 1 | 0 | 0 | 0 | 0 | 0 | 0 | 0 | 6 | 0 |
| 8 | (Moldova) | MF | Valentin Bîrdan | 0 | 0 | 1 | 0 | 0 | 0 | 0 | 0 | 0 | 0 | 1 | 0 |
| 9 | (Brazil) | FW | Juninho Potiguar | 2 | 0 | 1 | 0 | 0 | 0 | 0 | 0 | 0 | 0 | 3 | 0 |
| 11 | (Brazil) | MF | Ricardinho | 1 | 0 | 0 | 0 | 0 | 0 | 0 | 0 | 4 | 1 | 5 | 1 |
| 14 | (Burkina Faso) | MF | Wilfried Balima | 0 | 0 | 0 | 0 | 0 | 0 | 0 | 0 | 1 | 0 | 1 | 0 |
| 15 | (Ivory Coast) | DF | Marcel Metoua | 1 | 0 | 0 | 0 | 0 | 0 | 1 | 0 | 0 | 0 | 2 | 0 |
| 16 | (Moldova) | MF | Vadim Paireli | 7 | 1 | 0 | 0 | 0 | 0 | 0 | 0 | 0 | 0 | 7 | 1 |
| 20 | (Brazil) | MF | Cadú | 2 | 0 | 0 | 0 | 0 | 0 | 2 | 0 | 1 | 0 | 5 | 0 |
| 21 | (Israel) | MF | Kobi Moyal | 2 | 0 | 0 | 0 | 0 | 0 | 0 | 0 | 3 | 0 | 5 | 0 |
| 22 | (Guinea) | DF | Djibril Paye | 2 | 0 | 0 | 0 | 0 | 0 | 0 | 0 | 2 | 0 | 4 | 0 |
| 23 | (Brazil) | MF | Ernandes | 2 | 0 | 0 | 0 | 0 | 0 | 0 | 0 | 0 | 0 | 2 | 0 |
| 24 | (Moldova) | MF | Veaceslav Lisa | 1 | 0 | 0 | 0 | 0 | 0 | 0 | 0 | 0 | 0 | 1 | 0 |
| 25 | (Moldova) | GK | Sergiu Juric | 0 | 0 | 1 | 0 | 0 | 0 | 0 | 0 | 0 | 0 | 1 | 0 |
| 26 | (Slovenia) | DF | Miral Samardžić | 2 | 0 | 1 | 0 | 0 | 0 | 1 | 0 | 0 | 0 | 4 | 0 |
| 29 | (Bulgaria) | FW | Ismail Isa | 2 | 0 | 0 | 0 | 0 | 0 | 0 | 0 | 3 | 0 | 5 | 0 |
| 33 | (Moldova) | MF | Valeriu Macrițchii | 4 | 0 | 0 | 0 | 0 | 0 | 0 | 0 | 0 | 0 | 4 | 0 |
| 88 | (Serbia) | MF | Marko Stanojević | 2 | 0 | 0 | 0 | 0 | 0 | 0 | 0 | 0 | 0 | 2 | 0 |
| 90 | (Moldova) | FW | Luvannor | 4 | 0 | 1 | 1 | 1 | 0 | 1 | 0 | 4 | 1 | 11 | 2 |
Players away from Sheriff Tiraspol on loan:
| 9 | (Serbia) | FW | Marko Markovski | 1 | 0 | 0 | 0 | 1 | 0 | 0 | 0 | 0 | 0 | 2 | 0 |
Players who left Sheriff Tiraspol during the season:
| 10 | (Serbia) | FW | Aleksandar Pešić | 1 | 0 | 0 | 0 | 0 | 0 | 0 | 0 | 0 | 0 | 1 | 0 |
| 17 | (Moldova) | MF | Alexandru Scripcenco | 1 | 1 | 0 | 0 | 0 | 0 | 0 | 0 | 0 | 0 | 1 | 1 |
| 19 | (Brazil) | MF | Fernando | 1 | 0 | 0 | 0 | 0 | 0 | 2 | 0 | 0 | 0 | 3 | 0 |
| 33 | (Brazil) | DF | Willian Thuram | 1 | 0 | 0 | 0 | 0 | 0 | 1 | 0 | 0 | 0 | 2 | 0 |
| 77 | (Croatia) | GK | Vjekoslav Tomić | 0 | 0 | 0 | 0 | 0 | 0 | 0 | 0 | 1 | 0 | 1 | 0 |
| 89 | (Moldova) | MF | Alexandru Pașcenco | 1 | 0 | 0 | 0 | 0 | 0 | 0 | 0 | 0 | 0 | 1 | 0 |
| 99 | (Brazil) | FW | Jhulliam | 0 | 0 | 0 | 0 | 0 | 0 | 0 | 0 | 1 | 0 | 1 | 0 |
| | | | TOTALS | 46 | 2 | 6 | 1 | 2 | 0 | 8 | 0 | 20 | 3 | 82 | 6 |
