= 2014 Moldovan Super Cup =

Supercupa Moldovei
| Zimbru Chișinău | Sheriff Tiraspol |
| 1 | 1 |
- Zimbru won 4–3 on penalties
- Date: 27 June 2014
- Venue: Sheriff Stadium, Tiraspol

The 2014 Moldovan Super Cup was the eighth Moldovan Super Cup (Romanian: Supercupa Moldovei), an annual Moldovan football match played by the winner of the national football league (the National Division) and the winner of the national Cup. The match was played between Zimbru Chișinău, winners of the 2013–14 Moldovan Cup, and Sheriff Tiraspol, champions of the 2013–14 National Division. It was held at the Sheriff Stadium on 27 June 2014.
Zimbru won 4–3 on penalties, after the match finished 1–1 after 90 minutes.

== Match ==
27 June 2014
19:00 EEST

| Zimbru Chișinău | 1–1 | Sheriff Tiraspol |
|---|---|---|
| Grosu 45+1' | Report | Gînsari 45' |
Penalties
| Dedov (penalty missed); Erhan (penalty scored); Anton (penalty missed); Vremea (penalty scored); Pavlyuchek (penalty missed); Klimovich (penalty scored); Bogdan (penalty scored) | 4–3 | (penalty scored) Isa; (penalty missed) Paye; (penalty missed) Samardžić; (penalty missed) Metoua; (penalty scored) Ricardinho; (penalty scored) Benson; (penalty missed) Luvannor |

Sheriff Stadium, Tiraspol
Attendance: 5,000
Referee: Gabriel Tupicica

| Zimbru | Sheriff |

| GK | 12 | (Moldova) Denis Rusu |
| DF | 4 | (Moldova) Iulian Erhan (c) |
| DF | 5 | (Moldova) Constantin Bogdan |
| DF | 18 | (Belarus) Dzmitry Klimovich |
| DF | 21 | (Belarus) Kiril Pavlyuchek | (yellow card) 90' |
| MF | 8 | (Moldova) Alexandru Vremea |
| MF | 10 | (Moldova) Alexandru Pașcenco | (substituted off) 46' |
| MF | 11 | (Moldova) Alexandru Dedov |
| MF | 77 | (Moldova) Anatol Cheptine | (substituted off) 63' |
| MF | 94 | (Moldova) Dan Spătaru | (substituted off) 61' |
| FW | 31 | (Moldova) Alexandru Grosu | (substituted off) 71' |
Substitutes:
| GK | 89 | (Moldova) Anatol Chirinciuc |
| DF | 3 | (Moldova) Ștefan Burghiu | (substituted on) 71' |
| DF | 14 | (Moldova) Ion Jardan | (substituted on) 61' |
| MF | 7 | (Moldova) Gheorghe Anton | (substituted on) 63' |
| MF | 13 | (Moldova) Corneliu Pavalachi |
| MF | 25 | (Ivory Coast) Jean-Marie Amani | (substituted on) 46' |
| FW | 19 | (Moldova) Ilie Damașcan |
Manager:
(Belarus) Oleg Kubarev

| GK | 1 | (Moldova) Serghei Pașcenco |
| DF | 15 | (Ivory Coast) Marcel Metoua |
| DF | 22 | (Guinea) Djibril Paye |
| DF | 26 | (Slovenia) Miral Samardžić (c) |
| DF | 88 | (Brazil) Ligger |
| MF | 20 | (Brazil) Cadú | (substituted off) 67' |
| MF | 23 | (Brazil) Ernandes | (substituted off) 86' |
| MF | 91 | (Moldova) Serghei Gheorghiev | (yellow card) 63' |
| FW | 8 | (Moldova) Radu Gînsari | (substituted off) 58' |
| FW | 9 | (Brazil) Juninho Potiguar | (substituted off) 72' |
| FW | 90 | (Moldova) Henrique Luvannor |
Substitutions:
| GK | 25 | (Moldova) Sergiu Juric |
| DF | 30 | (Romania) Andrei Mureșan |
| MF | 11 | (Brazil) Ricardinho | (substituted on) 67' |
| MF | 24 | (Moldova) Veaceslav Lisa |
| MF | 33 | (Moldova) Valeriu Macrițchii |
| FW | 7 | (Moldova) Maxim Antoniuc |
| FW | 16 | (Moldova) Vadim Paireli | (substituted on) 58' |
| FW | 19 | (Netherlands) Fred Benson | (substituted on) 72' |
| FW | 27 | (Brazil) Klysman Henrique |
| FW | 29 | (Bulgaria) Ismail Isa | (substituted on) 86' |
| FW | 89 | (Moldova) Maxim Iurcu |
Manager:
(Moldova) Veaceslav Rusnac

Assistant referees:
Andrei Bodean
Victor Mardari
Fourth official:
Victor Gheciu

Match rules

- 90 minutes.
- Penalty shoot-out if score is still level.
- Eleven named substitutes, of which up to four may be used.
