= 2014–15 FC Zimbru Chișinău season =

Zimbru Chișinău
2014-15 season
- Chairman: Viktor Gushan
- Manager: Oleg Kubarev (until December); Veaceslav Rusnac (from December)
- Stadium: Zimbru Stadium
- Divizia Naţională: 6th
- Moldovan Cup: Quarterfinal vs Tiraspol
- Moldovan Super Cup: Winners
- Europa League: Playoff round vs PAOK

FC Zimbru Chișinău is a Moldovan football club based in Chișinău, the capital of Moldova. They play in the Divizia Naţională, the top division in Moldovan football. They play their home games at Zimbru Stadium which has a capacity of 10,500. During the 2014/15 campaign they will compete in the following competitions: Divizia Națională, Moldovan Cup, Supercup, Uefa Europa League.

== Competitions ==
=== Super Cup ===
27 June 2014	Zimbru Chișinău	1 – 1 (4 – 3 p)	Sheriff Tiraspol	Tiraspol
19:00 EEST (UTC+3)	A.S. Grosu 45+1'; Pavlyuchek (yellow card) 90'	Report	Gînsari 45'; Gheorghiev (yellow card) 63'	Stadium: Sheriff Stadium; Attendance: 5,000; Referee: Gabriel Tupicica
	Penalties
	Dedov (penalty missed); Erhan (penalty scored); Anton (penalty missed); Vremea (penalty scored); Pavlyuchek (penalty missed); Klimovich (penalty scored); Bogdan (penalty scored)		(penalty scored) Isa; (penalty missed) Paye; (penalty missed) Samardžić; (penalty missed) Metoua; (penalty scored) Ricardinho; (penalty scored) Benson; (penalty missed) Luvannor

=== Divizia Națională ===
==== Results summary ====
Overall								Home						Away					
Pld	W	D	L	GF	GA	GD	Pts	W	D	L	GF	GA	GD	W	D	L	GF	GA	GD
0	0	0	0	0	0	0	0	0	0	0	0	0	0	0	0	0	0	0	0

Last updated: 20 May 2015.
Source: Soccerway

==== Results ====
3 August 2014 1	Academia Chișinău	0 – 2	Zimbru Chișinău	Vadul lui Vodă
18:00 EEST (UTC+3)	Cheltuială (yellow card) 10' (red card) 90+5'; V.Negru (yellow card) 80'	Report	Grosu 11' (pen.); Damașcan 15'	Stadium: Teren 2 CPNS sintetic Attendance: 600; Referee: Veaceslav Banari

27 September 2014 9	Zimbru Chișinău	0 – 1	Sheriff Tiraspol	Chișinău
19:00 EEST (UTC+3)	Pavlyuchek (yellow card) 25'; Vremea (yellow card) 43'	Report	Mureşan 45'	Stadium: Zimbru Stadium; Attendance: 3,800; Referee: Petru Stoianov

2 November 2014 11	Zimbru Chișinău	0 – 1	Academia Chișinău	Chișinău
15:00 EET (UTC+2)	Pavlyuchek (yellow card) 50'; Klimovich (yellow card) 53'	Report	A.Koné (yellow card) 46'; Boghiu (yellow card) 49'; Țurcan 54' (pen.); Cheltuială (yellow card) 55'; V.Negru (yellow card) 84' (yellow-red card); Apostol (yellow card) 90+3'	Stadium: Zimbru Stadium; Attendance: 1,000; Referee: Dmitrii Muntean

4 March 2015 20	Sheriff Tiraspol	3 – 0	Zimbru Chișinău	Tiraspol
18:00 EET (UTC+2)	Cadú 3'; Ricardinho 18' (pen.); Dupovac 44'; V.Macrițchii (yellow card) 71'	Report	Vremea (yellow card) 33'; Rusu (yellow card) 72'	Stadium: Krytyj futbolnyj Manesh; Attendance: 2,800; Referee: Petru Stoianov

==== League table ====
Pos	Team	Pld	W	D	L	GF	GA	GD	Pts	Qualification
4	Tiraspol	24	14	2	8	49	28	+21	44	Team was dissolved after the season (Note: Tiraspol, the fourth-placed team, would have qualified for the Europa League first qualifying round, but were dissolved at the end of the 2014–15 season. As a result, the berth was given to Saxan, the fifth-placed team of the league.)
5	Saxan Ceadîr-Lunga	24	8	6	10	20	30	−10	30	Qualification for the Europa League first qualifying round
6	Zimbru Chișinău	24	7	6	11	23	19	+4	27	
7	Academia Chișinău	24	5	2	17	18	47	−29	17	
8	Dinamo-Auto Tiraspol	24	4	2	18	23	63	−40	14	

Source: Moldovan Football Federation
Rules for classification: 1st points; 2nd head-to-head points; 3rd head-to-head goal difference; 4th head-to-head goals scored; 5th goal difference; 6th number of goals scored; 7th Fair Play competition

=== Moldovan Cup ===
29 October 2014 Third Round	Găgăuzia	0 – 10	Zimbru Chișinău	Comrat
14:00 EET (UTC+2)			Grosu 17'; Vremea 22'; Potîrniche 28'; Dedov 31', 64', 70'; Spătaru 54'; Alexeev 61', 87'; Pașcenco 75'	Stadium: Stadion im. VG Mumzhieva

3 December 2014 Quarterfinal	Tiraspol	0 – 0 (a.e.t.) (4 – 3 p)	Zimbru Chișinău	Tiraspol
17:00 EET (UTC+2)		Report	Pavlyuchek (yellow card) 83'	Stadium: Krytyj futbolnyj Manesh; Attendance: 500; Referee: Iurie Rochin
	Penalties
	Sydorenko (penalty scored); Khachaturov (penalty missed); Bîrdan (penalty missed); Barroso (penalty scored); Boghiu (penalty scored); Molla (penalty scored)		Dedov (penalty scored); Erhan (penalty missed); Pașcenco (penalty scored); Grosu (penalty missed); Spătaru (penalty scored); Jardan (penalty missed)

=== UEFA Europa League ===
==== Qualifying rounds ====
2014 First Qualifying round 1st leg	–
EEST (UTC+3)

2014 First Qualifying round 2nd leg	– (– agg.)
EEST (UTC+3)

2014 Second Qualifying round 1st leg	–
EEST (UTC+3)

2014 Second Qualifying round 2nd leg	– (– agg.)
EEST (UTC+3)

2014 Third Qualifying round 1st leg	–
EEST (UTC+3)

2014 Third Qualifying round 2nd leg	– (– agg.)
EEST (UTC+3)

2014 Playoff round 1st leg	–
EEST (UTC+3)

2014 Playoff round 2nd leg	– (– agg.)
EEST (UTC+3)

== Squad statistics ==
As of Match played 24 May 2015

=== Appearances and goals ===
No.	Pos	Nat	Player	Total		Divizia Națională		Moldovan Cup		Super Cup		Europa League	
No.	Pos	Nat	Player	Apps	Goals	Apps	Goals	Apps	Goals	Apps	Goals	Apps	Goals
3	DF	(Moldova) MDA	Ștefan Burghiu	1	0	0	0	0	0	0+1	0	0	0
4	DF	(Moldova) MDA	Iulian Erhan	1	0	0	0	0	0	1	0	0	0
5	DF	(Moldova) MDA	Constantin Bogdan	1	0	0	0	0	0	1	0	0	0
7	MF	(Moldova) MDA	Gheorghe Anton	1	0	0	0	0	0	0+1	0	0	0
8	MF	(Moldova) MDA	Alexandru Vremea	1	0	0	0	0	0	1	0	0	0
10	MF	(Moldova) MDA	Alexandru Pașcenco	1	0	0	0	0	0	1	0	0	0
11	MF	(Moldova) MDA	Alexandru Dedov	1	0	0	0	0	0	1	0	0	0
12	GK	(Moldova) MDA	Denis Rusu	1	0	0	0	0	0	1	0	0	0
14	DF	(Moldova) MDA	Ion Jardan	1	0	0	0	0	0	0+1	0	0	0
18	DF	(Moldova) MDA	Dzmitry Klimovich	1	0	0	0	0	0	1	0	0	0
21	DF	(Moldova) MDA	Kiril Pavlyuchek	1	0	0	0	0	0	1	0	0	0
25	FW	(France) FRA	Jean-Marie Amani	1	0	0	0	0	0	0+1	0	0	0
31	FW	(Moldova) MDA	Alexandru Grosu	1	1	0	0	0	0	1	1	0	0
77	MF	(Moldova) MDA	Anatol Cheptine	1	0	0	0	0	0	1	0	0	0
94	MF	(Moldova) MDA	Dan Spătaru	1	0	0	0	0	0	1	0	0	0
Players who left Zimbru Chișinău during the season:
Players who appeared for Zimbru Chișinău no longer at the club:

=== Goal scorers ===
Place	Position	Nation	Number	Name	Divizia Națională	Moldovan Cup	Super Cup	Europa League	Total
1	FW	(Moldova)	31	Alexandru Grosu	0	0	1	0	1
				TOTALS	0	0	1	0	1

=== Disciplinary record ===
Number	Nation	Position	Name	Divizia Națională		Moldovan Cup		Moldovan Super Cup		Europa League		Total	
Number	Nation	Position	Name	Yellow card	Red card	Yellow card	Red card	Yellow card	Red card	Yellow card	Red card	Yellow card	Red card
21	(Belarus)	DF	Kiril Pavlyuchek	0	0	0	0	1	0	0	0	1	0
Players away from Zimbru Chișinău on loan:
Players who left Zimbru Chișinău during the season:
			TOTALS	0	0	0	0	1	0	0	0	1	0

== See also ==
- 2009–10 FC Zimbru Chișinău season
