= 2013 Moldovan Super Cup =

Supercupa Moldovei
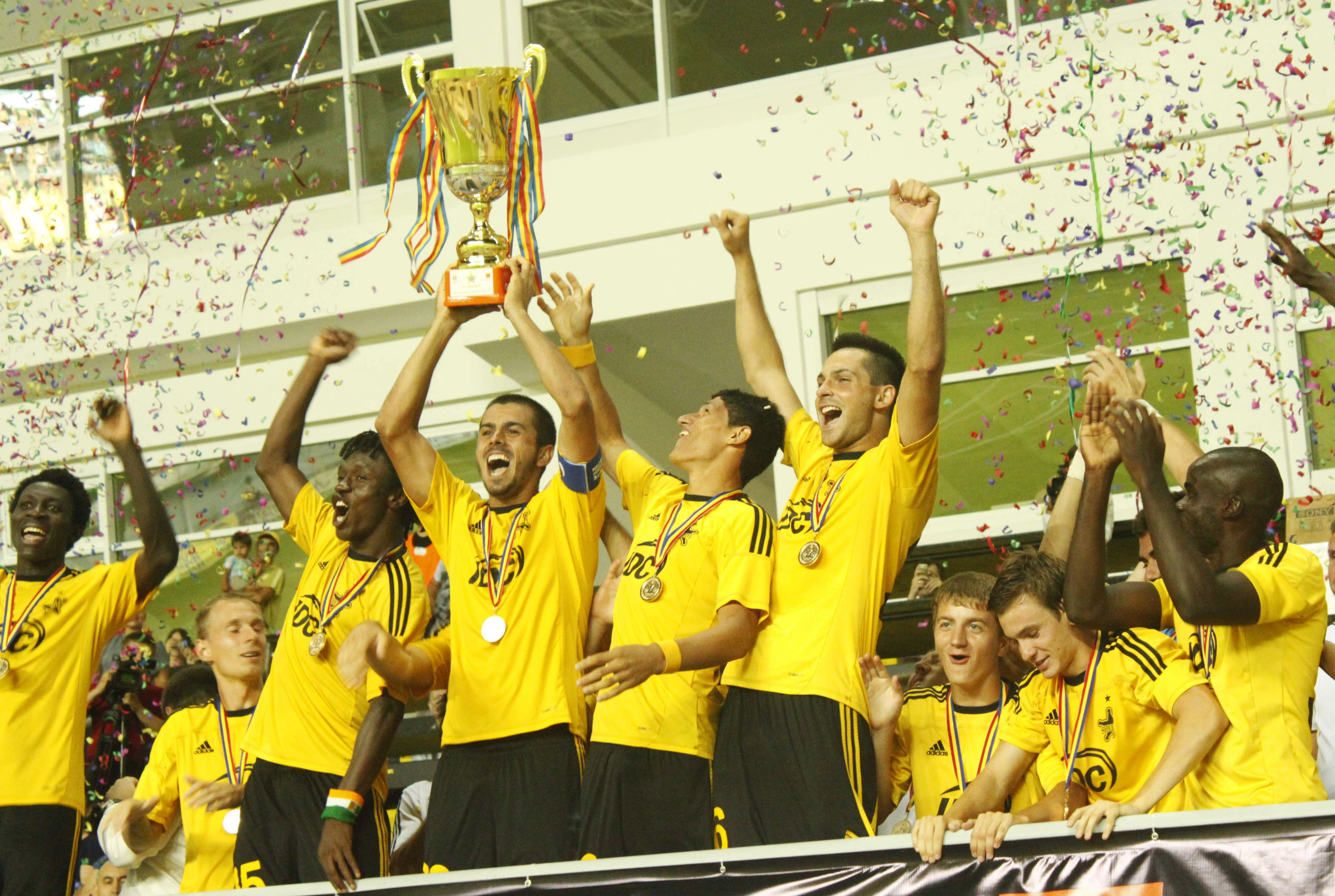
Sheriff Tiraspol	Tiraspol
2	0
- Date: 29 June 2013
- Venue: Sheriff Stadium, Tiraspol
- Referee: Serghei Derenov
- Attendance: 2,500

The 2013 Moldovan Super Cup was the seventh Moldovan Super Cup (Romanian: Supercupa Moldovei), an annual Moldovan football match played by the winner of the national football league (the National Division) and the winner of the national Cup. The match was played between Sheriff Tiraspol, champions of the 2012–13 National Division, and Tiraspol, winners of the 2012–13 Moldovan Cup. It was held at the Sheriff Stadium on 29 June 2013.

Sheriff Tiraspol won the match 2–0.

== Match ==
29 June 2013
19:00 EEST

Sheriff Tiraspol	2–0	Tiraspol
Isa 10'; Balima 59'

Sheriff Stadium, Tiraspol
Attendance: 2,500
Referee: Serghei Derenov

Sheriff	Tiraspol

GK	12	(Moldova) Dmitri Stajila
DF	15	(Ivory Coast) Marcel Metoua
DF	17	(Moldova) Alexandru Scripcenco
DF	22	(Guinea) Djibril Paye
DF	26	(Slovenia) Miral Samardžić
DF	27	(Moldova) Valeriu Macrițchii
MF	14	(Burkina Faso) Wilfried Balima		(substituted off) 86'
MF	88	(Serbia) Marko Stanojević
MF	89	(Moldova) Alexandru Pașcenco		(substituted off) 82'
FW	23	(Bulgaria) Ismail Isa		(substituted off) 58'
FW	90	(Moldova) Henrique Luvannor	(yellow card) 66'	(substituted off) 66'
Substitutes:
GK	25	(Bulgaria) Georgi Georgiev
DF	21	(Moldova) Artur Apostolov
DF	33	(Brazil) Willian Thuran
MF	20	(Brazil) Cadu		(substituted on) 82'
FW	9	(Serbia) Marko Markovski	(yellow card) 90'	(substituted on) 58'
FW	10	(Serbia) Aleksandar Pešić		(substituted on) 86'
FW	24	(Moldova) Veaceslav Lisa		(substituted on) 66'
Manager:
(Belarus) Vitali Rashkevich

GK	12	(Moldova) Vladimir Livșiț
DF	3	(Moldova) Dumitru Popovici
DF	5	(Moldova) Andrei Novicov
DF	19	(Moldova) Anatolie Boeștean
DF	26	(Armenia) Artyom Khachaturov
MF	7	(Ukraine) Yevhen Zarichnyuk
MF	8	(Ukraine) Serhiy Shapoval
MF	11	(Moldova) Nicolae Josan	(substituted off) 64'
MF	23	(Moldova) Victor Bulat
FW	9	(Moldova) Alexandru Popovici	(substituted off) 73'
FW	21	(Moldova) Alexandru S. Grosu	(substituted off) 46'
Substitutions:
GK	25	(Moldova) Alexandru Zveaghințev
DF	13	(Romania) Bogdan Hauși
DF	22	(Moldova) Serghei Diulgher
MF	10	(Moldova) Serghei Gheorghiev	(substituted on) 64'
MF	27	(Brazil) Fred Nélson
FW	15	(Bulgaria) Georgi Karaneychev	(substituted on) 46'
FW	18	(Nigeria) Charles Newuche	(substituted on) 73'
Manager:
(Moldova) Vlad Goian

Assistant referees:
Anatol Bodean
Vitalie Gorbatov
Fourth official:
Alexandru Tean

Match rules

- 90 minutes.
- Penalty shoot-out if score is still level.
- Seven named substitutes, of which up to four may be used.
