= 2013–14 Moldovan Cup =

Cupa Moldovei

Tournament details
- Country: Moldova
- Teams: 47

Final positions
- Champions: Zimbru Chișinău
- Runners-up: Sheriff Tiraspol

The 2013–14 Moldovan Cup is the 23rd season of the Moldovan annual football tournament. The competition began on 24 August 2013 with the First Preliminary Round and will end with the final held in May 2014. The winner of the competition will qualify for the first qualifying round of the 2014–15 UEFA Europa League.

== First Preliminary Round ==
Entering this round are 24 clubs from the Moldovan "B" Division. These matches took place on 24, 25 and 28 August 2013.

| Team 1 | Score | Team 2 |
|---|---|---|
| CS Drochia | 0−5 | FC Floreşti |
| FC Grănicerul | 2−1 | FC Dava Soroca |
| FC Sîngerei | 4−1 | FC Flacăra |
| FC Codru Junior | 1−4 | Codru Călăraşi |
| FC Olan | 0−1 | Sinteza Căuşeni |
| FC Congaz | 1−2 (a.e.t.) | Cahul-2005 |
| Anina-ȘS Anenii Noi | 0−2 | FC Tighina |
| FC Budăi | 2−1 | FC Telenești |
| FC Nisporeni | 2−3 | CF Ungheni |
| CSF Cricova | 2−0 | Iskra Rîbnița |
| Prut Leova | 2−3 | Maiak Chirsova |
| Universitatea Agrară | 0−6 | CFR Ialoveni |

== Second Preliminary Round ==
The 12 winners from the previous round and 2 clubs from the Moldovan "B" Division entered this stage of the competition. These matches took place on 31 August and 1 September 2013.

| Team 1 | Score | Team 2 |
|---|---|---|
| Codru Călăraşi | 2−3 | CF Ungheni |
| CSF Cricova | 1−2 | CFR Ialoveni |
| Sinteza Căuşeni | 2−3 (a.e.t.) | FC Tighina |
| Cahul-2005 | 3−1 | Maiak Chirsova |
| FC Comrat | 1−0 | CF Sparta |
| FC Grănicerul | 2−2 (a.e.t.) (5−4p) | FC Floreşti |
| FC Budăi | 1−3 | FC Sîngerei |

== First round ==
In this round enter teams from "A" Division. They will play against 7 winner teams from the second preliminary round. These matches took place on 14–15 September 2013.

| Team 1 | Score | Team 2 |
|---|---|---|
| FC Grănicerul | 5–4 (a.e.t.) | CF Rîşcani |
| FC Sîngerei | 4–2 | FC Edineţ |
| CFR Ialoveni | 0–1 | Victoria Bardar |
| CF Ungheni | 1–2 | FC Sfîntul Gheorghe |
| FC Tighina | 1–1 (a.e.t.) (4−5p) | Real Succes |
| Cahul-2005 | 2–6 | CF Găgăuzia |
| FC Comrat | 4–2 (a.e.t.) | FC Slobozia Mare |

== Second round ==
| Team 1 | Score | Team 2 |
|---|---|---|
| Veris | 4–0 | FC Comrat |
| Olimpia Bălți | 4–1 | Intersport-Aroma |
| Speranța | 2–3 (a.e.t.) | FC Saxan |
| FC Grănicerul | 0–4 | Dinamo-Auto |
| CF Găgăuzia | 1–2 | Real Succes |

== Third round ==
These matches took place on 25 and 26 March 2014.

| Team 1 | Score | Team 2 |
|---|---|---|
| FC Tiraspol | 1–0 | FC Saxan |
| Zimbru | 1–0 | Dinamo-Auto |
| Dacia | 8–0 | FC Sîngerei |
| Sfîntul Gheorghe | 0–3 | FC Academia |
| Victoria Bardar | 3–0 w/o | Rapid Ghidighici |
| Milsami Orhei | 2–0 | Real Succes |
| FC Costuleni | 0–3 | FC Veris |
| Sheriff Tiraspol | 4–0 | Olimpia Bălţi |

| 25 March 2014 | Victoria Bardar | 3–0 | Rapid Ghidighici | CSCT Buiucani, Chișinău |
| 14:00 CET | | awarded |

| 25 March 2014 | Dacia Chișinău | 8–0 | FC Sîngerei | Stadionul Moldova, Speia |
| 14:00 CET | Kovaļovs 13'; Krkotić 30'; Posmac 34'; Zastavnyi 49'; Golubović 53'; Knežević 63'; Stoleru 72', 89' | | | Referee: Ion Arnaut (Chirsova) |

| 25 March 2014 | Sheriff Tiraspol | 4–0 | Olimpia | Sheriff Stadium, Tiraspol |
| 17:00 CET | Luvannor 40'; Ricardinho 69'; Potiguar 71'; Melli 85' | | | Referee: Veaceslav Banari (Căușeni) |

| 26 March 2014 | FC Tiraspol | 1–0 | FC Saxan | Sheriff Stadium, Tiraspol |
| 14:00 CET | Karaneychev 29' |

| 26 March 2014 | Sfîntul Gheorghe | 0–3 | FC Academia | Suruceni Stadium, Suruceni |
| 14:00 CET | | | Calincov 58'; Calincov 61'; Calincov 71' |

| 26 March 2014 | Milsami Orhei | 2–0 | Real Succes | Complexul Sportiv Raional Orhei, Orhei |
| 14:00 CET | Iavorschi 17'; Iavorschi 78' |

| 26 March 2014 | FC Costuleni | 0–3 | FC Veris | CSCT Buiucani, Chișinău |
| 14:00 CET | | | Bacal 3'; V.Andronic 39'; Alexeev 60' |

| 26 March 2014 | Zimbru | 1–0 | Dinamo-Auto | Zimbru Stadium, Chișinău |
| 18:00 CET | Gînsari 88' |

== Quarter-finals ==
This round featured the eight winners from the previous round. The matches were played on 15 April 2014.

| Team 1 | Score | Team 2 |
|---|---|---|
| Zimbru Chişinău | 1–1 (a.e.t.) (7–6 p) | FC Tiraspol |
| Dacia | 3–0 | FC Academia |
| Victoria Bardar | 2–5 (a.e.t.) | Milsami Orhei |
| Sheriff Tiraspol | 2–1 | FC Veris |

| 15 April 2014 | Victoria Bardar | 2–5 (a.e.t.) | Milsami Orhei | CSCT Buiucani, Chișinău |
| 14:00 CET | Samson 55'; Spînu 63' | | Guilherme 57', 74', 110'; Boghiu 93', 100' | Referee: Iurie Covtun (Tighina) |

| 15 April 2014 | Dacia | 3–0 | FC Academia | Stadionul Moldova, Speia |
| 16:00 CET | Krkotić 2' (pen.), 37'; Orbu 76' | | | Referee: Dumitru Muntean (Tighina) |

| 15 April 2014 | Sheriff Tiraspol | 2–1 | FC Veris | Sheriff Stadium, Tiraspol |
| 17:00 CET | Potiguar 74', 90+4' | | Milinceanu 89' | Referee: Victor Gheciu (Măgdăceşti) |

| 15 April 2014 | Zimbru Chişinău | 1–1 (a.e.t.) (7–6 p) | FC Tiraspol | Zimbru Stadium, Chișinău |
| 18:00 CET | Spătaru 32' | | Molla 74' | Referee: Petru Stoianov (Taraclia) |
| | Penalties |
| | Dedov (penalty scored); Klimovich (penalty missed); Fernando Henrique (penalty scored); Erhan (penalty scored); Bogdan (penalty scored); Spătaru (penalty missed); Vremea (penalty scored); Pavlyuchek (penalty scored); Burghiu (penalty missed); Jardan (penalty scored) | | Molla (penalty scored); Grosu (penalty scored); Pîslă (penalty scored); Grosu (penalty scored); Hauşi (penalty missed); Japaridze (penalty missed); Zarichnyuk (penalty scored); Novicov (penalty scored); Raţă (penalty missed); Boeştean (penalty missed) |

== Semi-finals ==
This round featured the four winners from the previous round. The matches were played on 6 & 7 May 2014.

| Team 1 | Score | Team 2 |
|---|---|---|
| Zimbru Chişinău | 2–0 | Dacia Chişinău |
| Milsami Orhei | 0–2 | Sheriff Tiraspol |

| 6 May 2014 | Zimbru Chișinău | 2–0 | Dacia Chișinău | Zimbru Stadium, Chișinău |
| 20:00 CET | Pavlyuchek 58'; Klimovich 66' | | | Referee: Iurie Rochin |

| 7 May 2014 | Milsami Orhei | 0–2 | Sheriff Tiraspol | CSR Orhei, Orhei |
| 17:00 CET | | | Stanojević 17'; Potiguar 69' | Referee: Petru Stoianov |

== Final ==
This round featured the two winners from the previous round. The match were played on 25 May 2014.

| 25 May 2014 | Sheriff Tiraspol | 1–3 | Zimbru Chișinău | Zimbru Stadium, Chișinău |
| 20:00 EEST | Potiguar 59' | raport FMF | Spătaru 50'; Stanojević 65' (o.g.); Erhan 77' | Attendance: 8500; Referee: Danny Makkelie (Netherlands) |

== Top goalscorers ==
Updated to matches played on 7 May 2014.

| Rank | Player | Club | Goals |
|---|---|---|---|
| 1 | (Brazil) Juninho Potiguar | FC Sheriff Tiraspol | 5 |
| 2 | (Moldova) Denis Calincov | FC Academia Chişinău | 3 |
| 2 | (Brazil) Guilherme de Paula | FC Milsami Orhei | 3 |
| 2 | (Montenegro) Miloš Krkotić | FC Dacia Chişinău | 3 |
| 5 | (Moldova) Marian Stoleru | FC Dacia Chişinău | 2 |
| 5 | (Moldova) Constantin Iavorschi | FC Milsami Orhei | 2 |
| 5 | (Moldova) Gheorghe Boghiu | FC Milsami Orhei | 2 |
| 5 | (Moldova) Dan Spătaru | FC Zimbru Chişinău | 2 |

1 goal (22 players)

- (Latvia) Andrejs Kovaļovs (FC Dacia Chişinău)
- (Moldova) Veaceslav Posmac (FC Dacia Chişinău)
- (Moldova) Ghenadie Orbu (FC Dacia Chişinău)
- (Ukraine) Volodymyr Zastavnyi (FC Dacia Chişinău)
- (Montenegro) Radivoje Golubović (FC Dacia Chişinău)
- (Montenegro) Ivan Knežević (FC Dacia Chişinău)
- (Moldova) Henrique Luvannor (FC Sheriff Tiraspol)
- (Spain) Melli (FC Sheriff Tiraspol)
- (Brazil) Ricardinho (FC Sheriff Tiraspol)
- (Serbia) Marko Stanojević (FC Sheriff Tiraspol)
- (Moldova) Dumitru Bacal (FC Veris)
- (Moldova) Valeriu Andronic (FC Veris)
- (Moldova) Serghei Alexeev (FC Veris)
- (Moldova) Nicolae Milinceanu (FC Veris)
- (Bulgaria) Georgi Karaneychev (FC Tiraspol)
- (Moldova) Oleg Molla (FC Tiraspol)
- (Moldova) Iulian Erhan (FC Zimbru Chişinău)
- (Moldova) Radu Gînsari (FC Zimbru Chişinău)
- (Moldova) Dzmitry Klimovich (FC Zimbru Chişinău)
- (Belarus) Kirill Pavlyuchek (FC Zimbru Chişinău)
- (Moldova) Eugen Samson (Victoria Bardar)
- (Moldova) Andrei Spînu (Victoria Bardar)

=== Hat-tricks ===
Key
| ^{4} | Player scored four goals |
| ^{5} | Player scored five goals |

| Player | Home | Away | Result | Date |
|---|---|---|---|---|
| (Moldova) Denis Calincov | Sfîntul Gheorghe | FC Academia Chişinău | 0–3 | 26 March 2014 |
| (Brazil) Guilherme de Paula Lucrécio | Victoria Bardar | FC Milsami Orhei | 2–5 | 15 April 2014 |
