= Alexandru Grosu =

Alexandru Grosu can refer to:

- Alexandru A. Grosu (born 1988), Moldovan footballer who plays as midfielder
- Alexandru Sergiu Grosu (born 1986), Moldovan footballer who plays as striker
