= Denis Rusu (footballer, born 1990) =

Moldovan footballer

Personal information
- Date of birth: 2 August 1990 (age 36)
- Place of birth: Chișinău, Moldavian SSR, Soviet Union
- Height: 1.80 m (5 ft 11 in)
- Position: Goalkeeper

Team information
- Current team: Unirea Slobozia
- Number: 12

Youth career
- 1998–2008: CSCT Buiucani

Senior career*
Years	Team	Apps	(Gls)
2009−2014	Rapid Ghidighici	60	(2)
2014–2017	Zimbru Chișinău	64	(0)
2018–2020	Politehnica Iași	52	(0)
2020–2021	Viitorul Târgu Jiu	10	(0)
2021–2022	Universitatea Craiova	0	(0)
2023	Gloria Buzău	6	(0)
2023–	Unirea Slobozia	79	(0)

International career
2011–2012	Moldova U21	14	(0)
2020	Moldova	1	(0)
- * Club domestic league appearances and goals as of 19 September 2026

Denis Rusu (born 2 August 1990) is a Moldovan professional footballer who plays as a goalkeeper for Liga II club Unirea Slobozia.

== Club career ==
After progressing through the various youth teams of CSCT Buiucani, in 2008, Rusu moved to first league team Rapid Chișinău. He made his debut for Rapid in the 2009–10 season.

=== Politehnica Iași ===
After three years and winning the 2013–14 Moldovan Cup with Zimbru Chișinău, Rusu moved to Romanian first division club Politehnica Iași, and signed a short six-month contract with the team. He made his debut for his new side, on 12 February 2018, in a 1–0 win over local rivals FC Botoșani as a replacement for the injured Alexei Koșelev. After some good performances and helping Politehnica to the Championship play-offs, Rusu signed a new two-year deal to keep him in place until the summer of 2020.

== Career statistics ==
=== International ===
Appearances and goals by national team and year
National team	Year	Apps	Goals
Moldova
Moldova	2020	1	0
Total		1	0

== Honours ==
Zimbru Chișinău

- Moldovan Cup: 2013–14
- Moldovan Super Cup: 2014

Universitatea Craiova

- Supercupa României: 2021

Unirea Slobozia

- Liga II: 2023–24
