= Gheorghe Anton =

Moldovan footballer

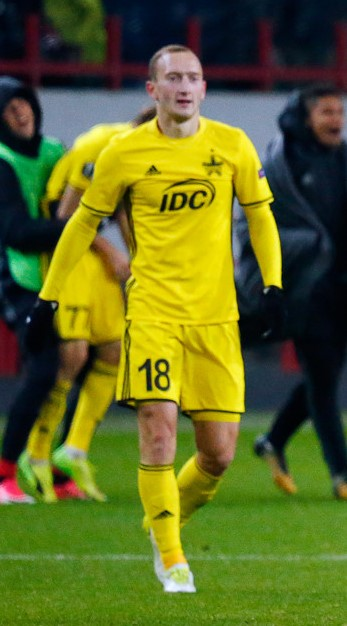
- Anton in 2017

Personal information
- Date of birth: 27 January 1993 (age 33)
- Place of birth: Chițcanii Vechi, Moldova
- Height: 1.80 m (5 ft 11 in)
- Position: Midfielder

Youth career
- –2012: Zimbru Chișinău

Senior career*
Years	Team	Apps	(Gls)
2012–2017	Zimbru Chișinău	121	(3)
2017–2019	Sheriff Tiraspol	51	(1)
2020	Zira	6	(0)
2020–2021	Gloria Buzău	11	(0)
2021	Brașov	4	(0)
2022	Zimbru Chișinău	17	(0)

International career
2011	Moldova U-19 (Note: Only official UEFA matches included)	2	(0)
2012–2014	Moldova U-21	24	(2)
2017–2021	Moldova	10	(0)
- * Club domestic league appearances and goals

Gheorghe Anton (born 27 January 1993) is a Moldovan former footballer who played as a midfielder. In his career, Anton also played for teams such as Zimbru Chișinău, Sheriff Tiraspol or SCM Gloria Buzău.

== Career ==
=== Club ===
On 25 January 2020, Anton signed for Zira FK on an 18-month contract.

== National team ==
=== International stats ===
Moldova national team
Year	Apps	Goals
2017	5	0
2018	0	0
2019	1	0
2020	0	0
Total	6	0

== Honours ==
Zimbru Chișinău

- Moldovan Cup (1): 2013–14
- Moldovan Super Cup (1): 2014

Sheriff Tiraspol

- Divizia Națională (3): 2017, 2018, 2019
- Moldovan Cup (1): 2018–19
