= Fernando (footballer, born May 1986) =

Brazilian footballer

Personal information
- Full name: Fernando Gomes de Jesus
- Date of birth: May 12, 1986 (age 40)
- Place of birth: Rio de Janeiro, Brazil
- Height: 1.84 m (6 ft 0 in)
- Position: Defensive midfielder

Team information
- Current team: Volta Redonda

Youth career
- 2003–2005: Fluminense

Senior career*
Years	Team	Apps	(Gls)
2005–2006	Fluminense	6	(0)
2007	São Paulo	6	(0)
2008	Goiás	27	(0)
2009	Portuguesa	2	(0)
2009	Goiás	20	(1)
2010–2011	Flamengo	35	(3)
2012	Grêmio Barueri	5	(0)
2013	Volta Redonda	13	(0)
2013–2014	Sheriff Tiraspol	10	(3)
2015	Bonsucesso	10	(1)
2015	Volta Redonda	2	(0)
2016	Inter de Lages	6	(0)
2016	CRAC	2	(0)
2016–	Volta Redonda	0	(0)
- * Club domestic league appearances and goals as of July 19, 2016

Fernando Gomes de Jesus, or simply Fernando (born May 12, 1986), is a Brazilian footballer who plays as a defensive midfielder for Volta Redonda.

Fernando is the half-brother of Carlos Alberto.

== Career ==
On January 8, 2010, Fernando signed with Flamengo.

== Career statistics ==
(Correct as of January 8, 2012)

Club	Season	Brazilian Série A		Copa do Brasil		Copa Libertadores		Copa Sudamericana		Carioca League		Total	
Club	Season	Apps	Goals	Apps	Goals	Apps	Goals	Apps	Goals	Apps	Goals	Apps	Goals
Flamengo	2010	10	0	-	-	2	0	-	-	9	3	21	3
Flamengo	2011	2	0	-	-	-	-	-	-	9	0	11	0
Flamengo	Total	12	0	0	0	2	0	0	0	18	3	32	3

according to combined sources on the Flamengo official website and Flaestatística.

== Honours ==
- São Paulo
  - Brazilian Série A: 2007
- Flamengo
  - Taça Guanabara: 2011
  - Taça Rio: 2011
  - Rio de Janeiro State League: 2011
