= Victor Gheorghiu =

Moldovan footballer

Personal information
- Full name: Victor Gheorghiu
- Date of birth: 24 June 1992 (age 34)
- Place of birth: Chișinău, Moldova
- Height: 1.76 m (5 ft 9 1/2 in)
- Position: Defender

Team information
- Current team: FC Milsami
- Number: 24

Senior career*
Years	Team	Apps	(Gls)
2011–2015	FC Milsami	34	(0)

International career^{‡}
2010–2011	Moldova-19	3	(0)
2013–2014	Moldova-21	6	(0)
- * Club domestic league appearances and goals as of 19 April 2015 ‡ National team caps and goals as of 15 November 2014

Victor Gheorghiu (born 24 June 1992) is a Moldovan international footballer playing for FC Milsami.

== Club statistics ==
- Total matches played in Moldavian First League: 34 matches - 0 goals
