= Alexandru Dedov =

Moldovan football midfielder

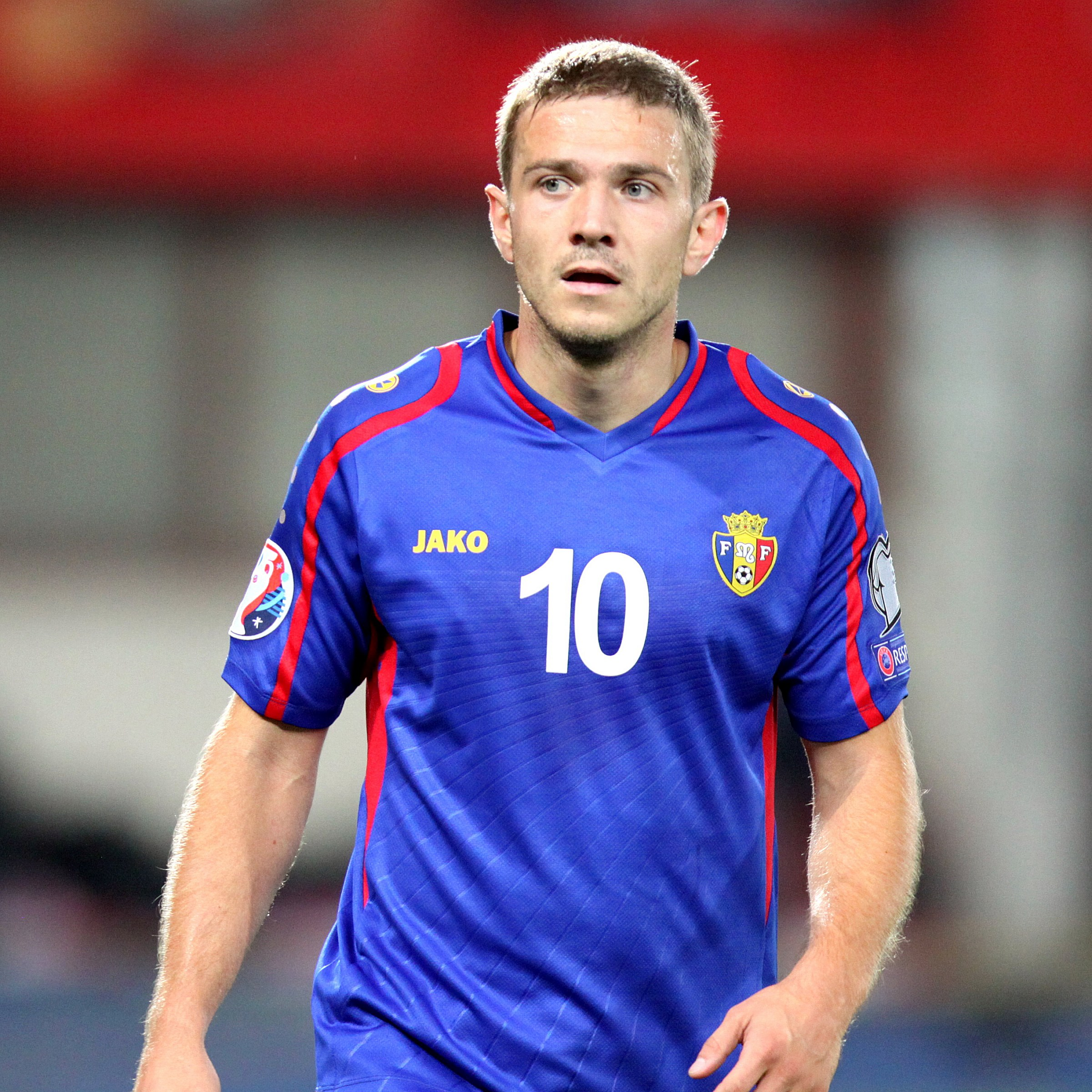
- Dedov with Moldova in 2015

Personal information
- Date of birth: 26 July 1989 (age 37)
- Place of birth: Chișinău, Moldavian SSR, Soviet Union
- Height: 1.75 m (5 ft 9 in)
- Position: Midfielder

Team information
- Current team: Olimp Comrat
- Number: 9

Senior career*
Years	Team	Apps	(Gls)
2009–2010	Ventspils	32	(3)
2010–2011	Dacia Chișinău	18	(1)
2011–2013	Sheriff Tiraspol	32	(4)
2013	Academia Chișinău	8	(1)
2013–2015	Zimbru Chișinău	54	(12)
2015–2016	Târgu Mureș	17	(1)
2016–2017	Milsami Orhei	41	(5)
2018–2019	Zira	33	(6)
2019–2020	Petrocub Hîncești	7	(2)
2020–2022	Milsami	44	(10)
2022–2023	Zimbru Chișinău	33	(10)
2024	Bălți	10	(1)
2024–2025	Spartanii Sportul	12	(0)
2025–	Olimp Comrat	0	(0)

International career^{‡}
	Moldova U17	14	(4)
	Moldova U19	18	(7)
	Moldova U21	11	(2)
2012–2019	Moldova	55	(3)
- * Club domestic league appearances and goals as of 14 February 2026 ‡ National team caps and goals as of 18 April 2023

Alexandru Dedov (born 26 July 1989) is a Moldovan professional footballer who plays as a midfielder for Moldovan Liga 1 club Olimp Comrat.

== Career statistics ==
=== International ===
Appearances and goals by national team and year
National team	Year	Apps	Goals
Moldova	2012	4	0
Moldova	2013	10	1
Moldova	2014	9	1
Moldova	2015	8	0
Moldova	2016	5	0
Moldova	2017	9	1
Moldova	2018	9	0
Moldova	2019	1	0
Total		54	3

Scores and results list Moldova's goal tally first, score column indicates score after each Dedov goal.

List of international goals scored by Alexandru Dedov
No.	Date	Venue	Opponent	Score	Result	Competition
1	14 August 2013	Zimbru Stadium, Chişinău, Moldova	Andorra	1–1	1–1	Friendly
2	8 October 2014	Zimbru Stadium, Chişinău, Moldova	Austria	1–1	1–2	UEFA Euro 2016 qualification
3	11 June 2017	Zimbru Stadium, Chişinău, Moldova	Georgia	2–0	2–2	2018 FIFA World Cup qualification

== Honours ==
FK Ventspils

- Virsliga: 2008

Dacia Chişinău

- Moldovan National Division: 2010–11

Sheriff Tiraspol

- Moldovan National Division: 2011–12

Zimbru Chișinău

- Moldovan Cup: 2013–14
- Moldovan Super Cup: 2014
