= Klysman Henrique =

Brazilian footballer

Personal information
- Full name: Klysman Henrique de Sousa Silva
- Date of birth: 10 September 1995 (age 31)
- Place of birth: Brazil
- Height: 1.78 m (5 ft 10 in)
- Position: Forward

Senior career*
Years	Team	Apps	(Gls)
2014–2015	Sheriff Tiraspol	1	(0)
2017	Santa Cruz	2	(0)
2018	Horizonte	4	(0)
- * Club domestic league appearances and goals as of 25 December 2018

Klysman Henrique de Sousa Silva is a Brazilian footballer who plays as a forward, most recently for Brazilian side Horizonte.

== Career ==
=== Club ===
In February 2014, Klysman Henrique signed for FC Sheriff Tiraspol. Klysman Henrique made his debut, and only appearance, for Sheriff Tiraspol on 21 May 2014 against FC Tiraspol. Klysman Henrique left Sheriff Tiraspol by mutual consent in February 2015.

== Personal life ==
Klysman Henrique is the younger brother of fellow footballer Henrique Luvannor.

== Career statistics ==
=== Club ===
As of match played 13 December 2014

Appearances and goals by club, season and competition
Club	Season	League			National Cup		Continental		Super Cup		Total	
Club	Season	Division	Apps	Goals	Apps	Goals	Apps	Goals	Apps	Goals	Apps	Goals
Sheriff Tiraspol	2013–14	Divizia Națională	1	0	0	0	-		-		1	0
Sheriff Tiraspol	2014–15	Divizia Națională	0	0	0	0	0	0	0	0	0	0
Sheriff Tiraspol	Total		1	0	0	0	0	0	0	0	1	0
Career total			1	0	0	0	0	0	0	0	1	0
