= Maxim Boghiu =

Moldavian footballer

Personal information
- Full name: Maxim Boghiu
- Date of birth: 24 May 1991 (age 35)
- Place of birth: Chișinău, Moldova
- Height: 1.80 m (5 ft 11 in)
- Position: Defender

Team information
- Current team: FC Academia Chișinău
- Number: 22

Youth career
- FC Zimbru Chișinău

Senior career*
Years	Team	Apps	(Gls)
2009–2011	FC Zimbru Chișinău	16	(0)
2011–2012	FC Sfântul Gheorghe Suruceni	14	(0)
2013–2014	FC Speranța Crihana Veche	26	(0)
2014–	FC Academia Chișinău	21	(0)
- * Club domestic league appearances and goals as of 4 June 2015

Maxim Boghiu (born 24 May 1991, Chișinău, Moldova) is a Moldavian football defender who plays for FC Academia Chișinău.

== Club statistics ==
- Total matches played in Moldavian First League: 77 matches - 0 goal
