= Marko Markovski =

Serbian professional footballer (born 1986)

Personal information
- Date of birth: 26 May 1986 (age 40)
- Place of birth: Belgrade, SFR Yugoslavia
- Height: 1.91 m (6 ft 3 in)
- Position: Forward

Team information
- Current team: Kallithea (technical director)

Youth career
- Zemun

Senior career*
Years	Team	Apps	(Gls)
2004–2006	Zemun	45	(13)
2006–2007	Partizan	5	(0)
2007	→ Borac Čačak (loan)	9	(1)
2007	→ Banat Zrenjanin (loan)	6	(1)
2008–2009	Kallithea	53	(19)
2009–2011	Doxa Drama	68	(33)
2011–2013	Skoda Xanthi	42	(12)
2013–2014	Sheriff Tiraspol	12	(6)
2013	→ Bnei Sakhnin (loan)	5	(0)
2014–2015	Kerkyra	29	(6)
2015–2017	Panetolikos	64	(14)
2018–2019	Levadiakos	42	(6)
2019–2020	Apollon Smyrnis	20	(8)
2020–2023	Kalamata	39	(9)
Total		439	(128)

International career
2004–2005	Serbia and Montenegro U19	9	(9)
- * Club domestic league appearances and goals

Marko Markovski (Serbian Cyrillic: Марко Марковски; born 26 May 1986) is a Serbian former professional footballer who played as a striker. He is currently technical director of Super League Greece 2 club Kallithea.

== Club career ==
=== Serbia ===
Markovski began his career in his neighbourhood as a youth for FK Zemun. He also signed his first professional contract and started his senior career in 2004 playing in Serbia with FK Zemun. Markovski made his First League of Serbia and Montenegro debut on 15 May 2004, in away match against FK Sutjeska Nikšić, where he managed to score in the 90th minute, sealing a 1–0 victory.

In 2006, he signed a four-year contract with Serbian giant FK Partizan, but played only a half season with them. He was mostly loaned to other teams, Serbian Superliga clubs FK Borac Čačak and FK Banat Zrenjanin.

=== Greece ===
Last days of January 2008, he moved to Greece where he signed with Beta Ethniki club Kallithea. He made his debut and also scored his first goal in Greece on 10 February 2008, in away victory 2–1 against Egaleo.

In August 2009, he signed a two-year contract with newly promoted Beta Ethniki team Doxa Drama. Markovski scored 52 goals in the three and a half years and 121 matches in Beta Ethniki.

In July 2011, he signed a three-year contract with Super League Greece club Skoda Xanthi, becoming the first Serbian player ever who signed for that club. He made his Super League Greece debut in a 1–0 away defeat against PAOK on 28 August 2011.

Markovski scored his first Super League Greece goal in a 3–4 defeat at home to AEK Athens on 21 September.

After very successful playing for Skoda Xanthi, 42 appearances and 12 goals in Super League Greece, the club got very good offer and Markovski moved to Sheriff Tiraspol.

=== Moldova ===
On 20 February 2013, he signed a three-and-a-half-year contract with Moldovan National Division club FC Sheriff Tiraspol becoming one of the biggest transfer ever in Moldovan football.He celebrated the championship and super cup of Moldovan National Division.

After playing seven months there, he went to loan to Israel. In August 2014 the player's contract is terminated by mutual consent.

=== Israel ===
On 17 September 2013, he signed a loan contract with Bnei Sakhnin. He stayed in Israel for only three and a half months and on 1 January 2014, returned to FC Sheriff Tiraspol.

=== Return to Greece ===
In August 2014, he returned to Greece and signed a two-year contract with Super League Greece club Kerkyra.

On 18 August 2015, Kerkyra was dismissed by Super League Greece and automatically got relegated to Football League as they were accused and proved to commit fake transfer of shares. Kerkyra were given the last place on the league table.

Two days later, on 20 August 2015, Markovski signed one-year contract with Panetolikos. He made his debut in a 2–1 defeat at home to Panathinaikos on 24 August.

On 25 May 2016, he signed a two-year contract extension with Panetolikos. Markovski and Panetolikos parted ways on 27 December 2017.

On 28 December 2017, Levadiakos officially announced the capture of experienced striker, who was recently released from Panetolikos.

The 31-year-old Serbian signed contract with the in-form team of French manager José Anigo until the end of 2019–20 season.

In summer 2019 Markovski left Levadiakos and joined Greek historic football club Apollon Smyrnis for one-year contract. He managed to score his first goal for the new club on his debut against Ergotelis.

On 25 September 2020, Markovski signed two-year contract with Kalamata.In his first season he helped the club by scoring six league goals in 18 matches and getting promoted to Super League Greece 2 after 11 years.

On 12 January 2022, Markovski tore his anterior cruciate ligament in the last minute of the Super League Greece 2 match against Fc Irodotos.

On 28 September 2022, Markovski signed one-year contract extension with Kalamata after successfully recovering from ACL injury.

Markovski is one of the few foreign players who managed to score over 100 league goals, including the first and second Greek leagues.

== International career ==
Markovski was one of the most important Serbia and Montenegro under-19 player's, scoring 8 goals in 6 UEFA European Under-19 Championship qualifying matches. He scored the winning goal against Poland after which Serbia and Montenegro qualified for the UEFA European Under-19 Championship finals.

In 2005, he was selected to represent the Serbia and Montenegro under-19 team in the 2005 UEFA European Under-19 Championship. He was one of the scorer's for Serbia and Montenegro national team under-19 in stunning comeback against Germany which ended 4–2.
