= Juninho Potiguar =

Brazilian footballer

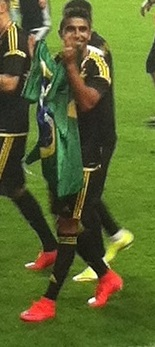
- Potiguar in Moldova Supercup 2015

Personal information
- Full name: Jarlesson Inácio Júnior
- Date of birth: 22 February 1990 (age 36)
- Place of birth: Natal, Brazil
- Height: 1.77 m (5 ft 10 in)
- Position: Forward

Team information
- Current team: Caxias

Youth career
- –2009: Brasilis
- 2009: Sport Recife

Senior career*
Years	Team	Apps	(Gls)
2010–2011	Sport Recife	0	(0)
2011	→ América (loan)	7	(0)
2012	Corinthians Alagoano		
2013	Icasa	66	(20)
2014–2016	Sheriff Tiraspol	39	(20)
2016	Al Shabab	11	(0)
2017–2019	Santa Cruz de Natal	0	(0)
2017	→ Fortaleza (loan)	7	(0)
2017	→ América de Natal (loan)	0	(0)
2018	→ CRB (loan)	11	(2)
2018	→ Boa Esporte (loan)	10	(1)
2019	→ URT (loan)	10	(2)
2019	→ Ferroviário (loan)	3	(0)
2020–	Caxias	10	(0)
- * Club domestic league appearances and goals as of 15 March 2020

Jarlesson Inácio Júnior (born 22 February 1990), commonly known as Juninho Potiguar, is a Brazilian footballer who plays as a forward for Brazilian club Caxias.

== Career statistics ==
As of match played 15 March 2020

Appearances and goals by club, season and competition
Club	Season	League			State League		Domestic Cup (Note: Includes the Copa do Brasil and Moldovan Cup)		League Cup (Note: Includes the UAE League Cup and Copa do Nordeste)		Continental		Other		Total	
Club	Season	Division	Apps	Goals	Apps	Goals	Apps	Goals	Apps	Goals	Apps	Goals	Apps	Goals	Apps	Goals
Sport Recife	2010	Série B	0	0	0	0	1	0	—		—		—		1	0
Sport Recife	2011	Série B	0	0	0	0	0	0	—		—		—		0	0
Sport Recife	Total		0	0	0	0	1	0	0	0	0	0	0	0	1	0
América (loan)	2011		—		7 (Note: Appearances in the Campeonato Pernambucano)	0	—		—		—		—		7	0
Corinthians Alagoano	2012		—				—		—		—		—			
Icasa	2013	Série B	36	9	30 (Note: Appearances in the Campeonato Cearense)	11	—		—		—		—		66	20
Sheriff Tiraspol	2013–14	Divizia Națională	10	9	—		3	4	—		0	0	0	0	13	13
Sheriff Tiraspol	2014–15	Divizia Națională	22	8	—		2	1	—		5 (Note: Three appearances in the UEFA Champions League, two in the UEFA Europa League)	0	1 (Note: Appearance in the Moldovan Super Cup)	0	30	9
Sheriff Tiraspol	2015–16	Divizia Națională	7	3	—		1	4	—		2 (Note: Appearances in the UEFA Europa League)	0	1	1	11	8
Sheriff Tiraspol	Total		39	20	0	0	6	9	0	0	7	0	2	1	54	30
Al Shabab	2015–16	UAE Pro League	11	0	—		0	0	1	0	1 (Note: Appearance in the AFC Champions League)	0	—		13	0
Santa Cruz de Natal	2017		—		0	0	—		—		—		—		0	0
Santa Cruz de Natal	2018		—		0	0	—		—		—		—		0	0
Santa Cruz de Natal	Total		0	0	0	0	0	0	0	0	0	0	0	0	0	0
Fortaleza (loan)	2017	Série C	0	0	7	0	0	0	2	0	—		—		9	0
América de Natal (loan)	2017	Série D	0	0	0	0	0	0	0	0	—		—		0	0
CRB (loan)	2018	Série B	4	0	7 (Note: Appearances in the Campeonato Alagoano)	2	2	0	7	0	—		—		20	2
Boa Esporte (loan)	2018	Série B	10	1	0	0	0	0	—		—		—		10	1
URT (loan)	2019	Série D	0	0	10 (Note: Appearances in the Campeonato Mineiro)	3	2	1	—		—		—		12	4
Ferroviário (loan)	2019	Série C	3	0	0	0	0	0	—		—		—		3	0
Caxias	2020	Série D	0	0	10 (Note: Appearances in the Campeonato Gaúcho)	0	1	0	—		—		—		11	0
Career total			103	30	71	16	12	10	10	0	8	0	2	1	206	57

== Honours ==
Sheriff Tiraspol

- Moldovan National Division (1): 2013–14
