= Veaceslav Lisa =

Moldovan footballer

Personal information
- Full name: Veaceslav Lisa
- Date of birth: 24 May 1993 (age 33)
- Place of birth: Chișinău, Moldova
- Height: 1.75 m (5 ft 9 in)
- Position: Midfielder

Team information
- Current team: FC Speranis Nisporeni
- Number: 19

Senior career*
Years	Team	Apps	(Gls)
2011–2014	Sheriff Tiraspol	21	(7)
2014–2015	FC Saxan	4	(0)
2015–2016	Academia Chișinău	7	(0)
2016–2016	FC Ungheni	4	(0)
2016–2017	FC Sfântul Gheorghe Suruceni	16	(3)
2017–2018	FC Spicul Chișcăreni	8	(0)
2019-2021	FC Speranta Drochia	65	(9)
2021	FC Speranis Nisporeni	44	(2)

International career
2009–2010	Moldova U17	3	(0)
2011–2012	Moldova U19	3	(0)
2013-2014	Moldova U21	1	(0)
- * Club domestic league appearances and goals as of 23 July 2012

Veaceslav Lisa (born 24 May 1993) is a Moldovan football midfielder who plays for FC Speranta Drochia.

== Honours ==
- Moldovan National Division: 2011–12, 2012–13 2013–14
- Moldovan Super Cup: 2013
