= Alexandru Scripcenco =

Moldovan footballer (1991–2023

Personal information
- Full name: Alexandru Scripcenco
- Date of birth: 13 January 1991
- Place of birth: Tiraspol, Moldova
- Date of death: 3 March 2023 (aged 32)
- Height: 1.87 m (6 ft 1 1/2 in)
- Position: Defender

Youth career
- Sheriff Tiraspol

Senior career*
Years	Team	Apps	(Gls)
2009–2011	Sheriff Tiraspol	16	(0)
2011–2012	Iskra-Stal Rîbniţa	22	(1)
2012–2013	FC Tiraspol	4	(0)
2013–2014	Sheriff Tiraspol	9	(0)
2014	FC Costuleni	10	(0)
2015–2018	FC Dinamo-Auto Tiraspol	82	(1)
2019–2020	FC Florești	0	(0)

International career
2009–2012	Moldova U21	9	(0)
- * Club domestic league appearances and goals as of 15:45, 28 February 2014 (UTC)

Alexandru Scripcenco (13 January 1991 – 3 March 2023) was a Moldovan footballer who played as a defender. His contract with Sheriff was terminated by mutual consent on 27 February 2014. He has represented his country at under-21 international level.

On 3 March 2023 he died at the age of 32.
