= Sergiu Juric =

Moldovan footballer

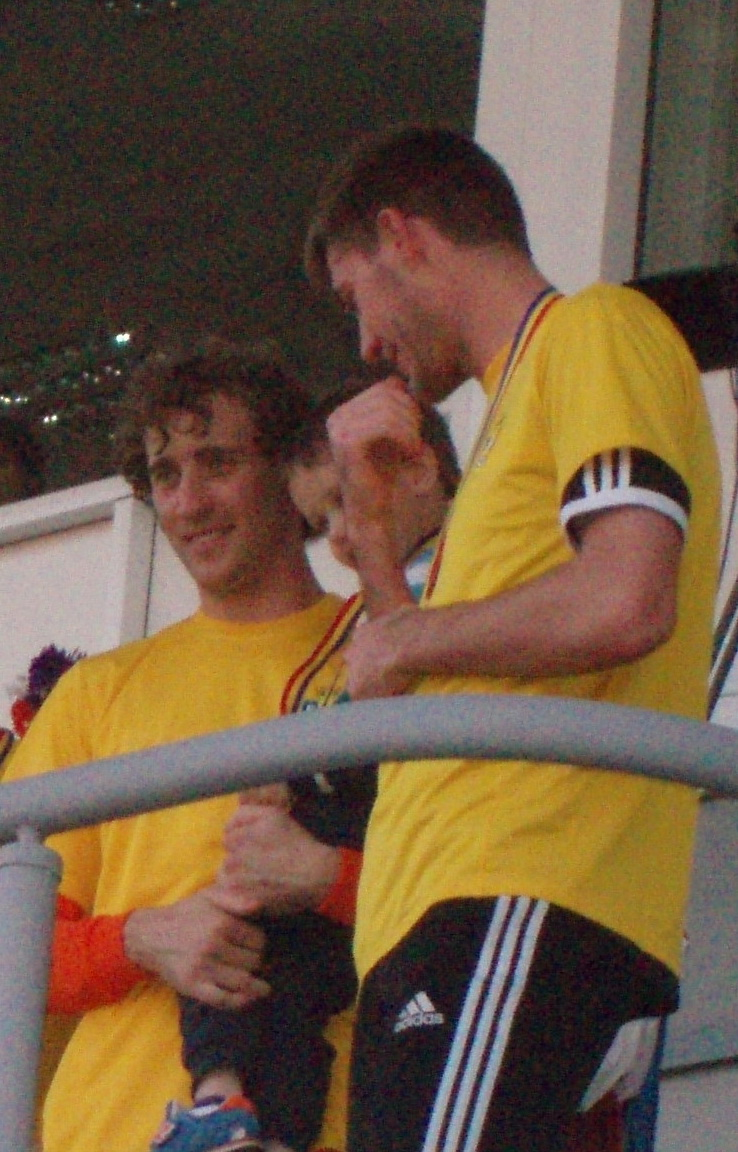
- Juric (left) in 2014

Personal information
- Full name: Sergiu Juric
- Date of birth: 3 March 1984 (age 42)
- Place of birth: Chișinău, Moldovan SSR
- Height: 1.90 m (6 ft 3 in)
- Position: Goalkeeper

Youth career
- Sheriff Tiraspol

Senior career*
Years	Team	Apps	(Gls)
2003–2006	Sheriff Tiraspol	1	(0)
2006–2011	FC Tiraspol	76	(0)
2011–2013	Iskra-Stal	31	(0)
2013–2014	Veris Chișinău	3	(0)
2014–2015	Sheriff Tiraspol	12	(0)
2015	Zaria Bălți	0	(0)
2016–2017	Sheriff Tiraspol	10	(0)
- * Club domestic league appearances and goals as of 4 July 2018

Sergiu Juric (born 3 March 1984) is a Moldovan professional footballer who plays as a goalkeeper.
