= Marian Stoleru =

Moldovan footballer

Personal information
- Full name: Marian Stoleru
- Date of birth: 20 November 1988 (age 37)
- Place of birth: Chișinău, Moldavian SSR
- Height: 1.75 m (5 ft 9 in)
- Position: Midfielder

Team information
- Current team: SV Pars Neu-Isenburg
- Number: 33

Senior career*
Years	Team	Apps	(Gls)
2010–2011	CF Găgăuzia	28	(3)
2011–2013	Milsami Orhei	33	(4)
2013–2015	Dacia Chișinău	46	(6)
2015–2016	Academia Chișinău	12	(1)
2019–	SV Pars Neu-Isenburg	20	(3)
- * Club domestic league appearances and goals as of 00:51, 17 May 2020 (UTC)

Marian Stoleru (born 20 November 1988, Chișinău, Moldavian SSR) is a Moldavian football midfielder who plays for German club SV Pars Neu-Isenburg.

== Club statistics ==
- Total matches played in Moldavian First League: 63 matches – 8 goals
