= Ernandes =

Brazilian footballer (born 1987)

Personal information
- Full name: Ernandes Dias Luz
- Date of birth: 11 November 1987 (age 39)
- Place of birth: São Félix do Araguaia, Brazil
- Height: 1.74 m (5 ft 9 in)
- Positions: Defensive midfielder; left back

Team information
- Current team: Joinville

Youth career
- Americano

Senior career*
Years	Team	Apps	(Gls)
2006–2011	Americano		
2008	→ Sampaio Corrêa (loan)		
2009	→ Ferroviário (loan)		
2009	→ Vitória (loan)		
2010–2011	→ Ceará (loan)	23	(1)
2011–2014	Atlético Goianiense	77	(3)
2014–2015	Sheriff Tiraspol	26	(1)
2015	Ceará	0	(0)
2016–2017	América Mineiro	58	(2)
2018	Ceará	1	(0)
2018	Goiás	31	(2)
2019	Chapecoense	2	(0)
2020–2021	Mirassol	17	(0)
2020	→ Ponte Preta (loan)	16	(1)
2021–2023	CSA	59	(1)
2024	Ferroviário	23	(1)
2024–	Joinville	14	(0)
- * Club domestic league appearances and goals as of 26 August 2023

Ernandes Dias Luz (born 11 November 1987), simply known as Ernandes, is a Brazilian footballer who plays as a defensive midfielder or a left back.

== Career ==
Ernandes played some games for Vitória in 2009 and in 2010 arrived in Ceará, but had passed by the club in 2007. He also spent time on trial in Norway.

Ernandes made his debut in the Campeonato Brasileiro Serie A for Ceará as a substitute against Fluminense Football Club on 9 May 2010. He scored his first goal in Serie A against Guarani Futebol Clube on 22 July 2010.

On 28 June 2011, Atlético Goianiense announced the signing of Ernandes on a season-long loan deal.

In January 2014, Ernandes signed for Moldovan side FC Sheriff Tiraspol.

== Career statistics ==
=== Club ===
As of match played 25 July 2015

Appearances and goals by club, season and competition
Club	Season	League			National Cup		Continental		Super Cup		Total	
Club	Season	Division	Apps	Goals	Apps	Goals	Apps	Goals	Apps	Goals	Apps	Goals
Sheriff Tiraspol	2013–14	Divizia Națională	9	0	3	0	0	0	0	0	12	0
Sheriff Tiraspol	2014–15	Divizia Națională	16	1	2	0	4	0	1	0	22	1
Sheriff Tiraspol	2015–16	Divizia Națională	1	0	0	0	2	0	0	0	3	0
Sheriff Tiraspol	Total		26	1	5	0	6	0	1	0	38	1
Career total			26	1	5	0	6	0	1	0	38	1

== Honours ==
Ceará

- Campeonato Cearense: 2011, 2018

Sheriff Tiraspol

- Divizia Națională (1): 2013–14
- Moldovan Cup (1): 2014–15
- Moldovan Super Cup (1): 2015

América Mineiro

- Campeonato Mineiro: 2016
- Campeonato Brasileiro Série B: 2017
