= Speia, Anenii Noi =

Speia
- Village
- Interactive map of Speia
- Country: Moldova
- District: Anenii Noi District

Population (2014 census)
  - Total: 2,725
- Time zone: UTC+2 (EET)
  - Summer (DST): UTC+3 (EEST)

Speia is a village in the Anenii Noi District of Moldova.
