= Valentin Bîrdan =

Moldovan footballer

Personal information
- Date of birth: 13 May 1995 (age 31)
- Place of birth: Tiraspol, Moldova
- Height: 1.73 m (5 ft 8 in)
- Position: Midfielder

Youth career
- Sheriff-2 Tiraspol

Senior career*
Years	Team	Apps	(Gls)
2013–2014	Sheriff Tiraspol	18	(1)
2014–2015	Tiraspol	14	(1)
2015–2016	Milsami Orhei	5	(0)
2016–2017	Academia Chișinău	19	(1)
2017–2019	Dinamo-Auto Tiraspol	23	(1)
- * Club domestic league appearances and goals as of 6 April 2021

Valentin Bîrdan (born 13 May 1995) is a Moldovan footballer who plays as a midfielder. He most recently played for Dinamo-Auto Tiraspol.
