= Jean-Marie Amani =

Ivorian footballer (born 1989)

Personal information
- Full name: Jean-Marie Landry Asmin Amani
- Date of birth: 15 April 1989 (age 37)
- Place of birth: Achiékoi, Ivory Coast
- Height: 1.77 m (5 ft 10 in)
- Position: Attacking midfielder

Senior career*
Years	Team	Apps	(Gls)
2013–2014	Tauras Taurage	11	(5)
2014–2016	Zimbru Chișinău	56	(6)
- * Club domestic league appearances and goals as of 20 September 2016

Jean-Marie Landry Asmin Amani (born 15 April 1989), commonly known as Jean-Marie Amani, is an Ivorian footballer.

== Honours ==
Zimbru Chișinău

- Moldovan Cup (1): 2013–14
- Moldovan Super Cup (1): 2014
