= Ricardinho (footballer, born September 1989) =

Brazilian footballer

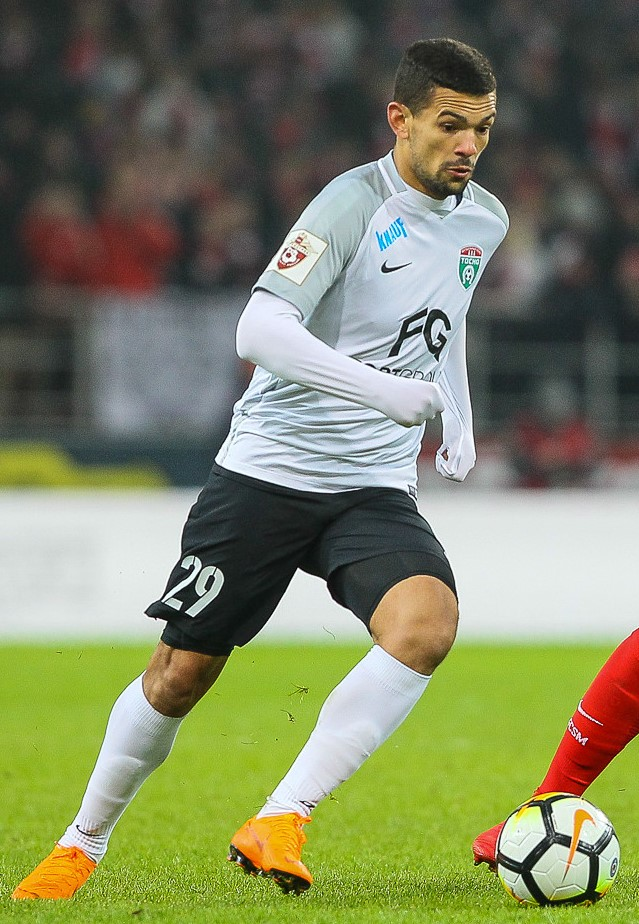
- Ricardinho with Tosno in 2018

Personal information
- Full name: Ricardo Cavalcante Mendes
- Date of birth: 4 September 1989 (age 37)
- Place of birth: São Paulo, Brazil
- Height: 1.78 m (5 ft 10 in)
- Position: Forward

Team information
- Current team: Rio Branco

Youth career
- 2007: Santo André

Senior career*
Years	Team	Apps	(Gls)
2008–2009	Santo André	2	(0)
2010	Mogi Mirim	24	(5)
2011	→ Bogdanka Łęczna (loan)	16	(5)
2011–2012	Wisła Płock	33	(12)
2012–2013	Lechia Gdańsk	27	(7)
2013–2017	Sheriff Tiraspol	91	(48)
2016	→ Al-Sharjah (loan)	12	(3)
2017	Red Star Belgrade	3	(1)
2018	Tosno	9	(0)
2018–2020	Wisła Płock	52	(14)
2020–2021	Khor Fakkan	18	(4)
2021–2022	ŁKS Łódź	37	(6)
2023–2024	Sheriff Tiraspol	29	(4)
2025–	Rio Branco	9	(1)
- * Club domestic league appearances and goals as of 23 August 2025

Ricardo Cavalcante Mendes (born 4 September 1989), or simply Ricardinho, is a Brazilian professional footballer who plays as a forward or left winger for Rio Branco.

== Club career ==
=== Górnik Łęczna ===
In February 2011, Ricardinho was loaned to Bogdanka Łęczna on a half-year deal.

=== Sheriff Tiraspol ===
Ricardinho joined Sheriff Tiraspol on 1 July 2013, for a fee of €350,000. During the first half of the 2014–15 Moldovan National Division season, Ricardinho scored 11 goals in 14 games, but, due to the withdrawal of Veris Chișinău and Costuleni from the league, Ricardinho's goals against these teams were canceled. As a result, 2 goals were stripped off from Ricardinho's total goal tally.

==== Al-Sharjah loan ====
On 21 January 2016, Ricardinho moved to UAE Arabian Gulf League side Al-Sharjah on loan, returning to Sheriff Tiraspol on 5 July 2016.

=== Red Star Belgrade ===
On 16 June 2017, Ricardinho signed a two-year deal with Red Star Belgrade, choosing number 89 on his jersey. He made his Red Star debut in a 3–0 win against Floriana. He stayed in the club for only half of a season and played 10 matches and scored 1 goal in total. Ricardinho was released in December 2017 after being injured for most of the season.

=== Tosno ===
On 11 January 2018, Ricardinho signed a 1.5-year contract with the Russian Premier League club FC Tosno. He came off the bench as Tosno won the 2017–18 Russian Cup final against FC Avangard Kursk on 9 May 2018 in the Volgograd Arena.

=== Return to the Sheriff Tiraspol ===
On 11 March 2023, Ricardinho returned to Sheriff. On 2 July 2024, Sheriff announced the departure of Ricardinho after his contract expired.

== Career statistics ==
As of match played 18 May 2024

Appearances and goals by club, season and competition
Club	Season	League			Cup		Continental		Other		Total	
Club	Season	Division	Apps	Goals	Apps	Goals	Apps	Goals	Apps	Goals	Apps	Goals
Santo André	2009	Série A	1	0	0	0	—		6 (Note: Six appearances in Campeonato Paulista)	2	7	2
Mogi Mirim	2010		—		—		—		0	0	0	0
Górnik Łęczna	2010–11	I liga	16	5	—		—		—		16	5
Wisła Płock	2011–12	I liga	33	12	1	0	—		—		34	12
Lechia Gdańsk	2012–13	Ekstraklasa	27	7	1	0	—		—		28	7
Sheriff Tiraspol	2013–14	Moldovan National Division	28	8	2	0	11	2	–		41	10
Sheriff Tiraspol	2014–15	Moldovan National Division	25	20	4	2	6	1	1 (Note: Appearance in Moldovan Super Cup)	0	36	23
Sheriff Tiraspol	2015–16	Moldovan National Division	13	6	1	0	2	0	1	0	17	6
Sheriff Tiraspol	2016–17	Moldovan National Division	27	15	4	3	2	0	1	0	34	18
Sheriff Tiraspol	Total		93	49	11	5	21	3	3	0	128	57
Sharjah (loan)	2015–16	UAE Arabian Gulf League	12	3	0	0	—		—		12	3
Red Star Belgrade	2017–18	Serbian SuperLiga	3	1	1	0	6	0	—		10	1
Tosno	2017–18	Russian Premier League	9	0	2	0	—		—		11	0
Wisła Płock	2018–19	Ekstraklasa	35	10	2	1	—		—		37	11
Wisła Płock	2019–20	Ekstraklasa	17	4	0	0	—		—		17	4
Wisła Płock	Total		52	14	2	1	0	0	0	0	54	15
Khor Fakkan	2019–20	UAE Pro League	7	1	0	0	—		—		7	1
Khor Fakkan	2020–21	UAE Pro League	11	3	0	0	—		—		11	3
Khor Fakkan	Total		18	4	0	0	0	0	0	0	18	4
ŁKS Łódź	2020–21	I liga	17	6	0	0	—		—		17	6
ŁKS Łódź	2021–22	I liga	20	0	1	0	—		—		21	0
ŁKS Łódź	Total		37	6	2	1	0	0	0	0	38	6
Sheriff Tiraspol	2022–23	Moldovan National Division	7	0	4	0	0	0	—		11	0
Sheriff Tiraspol	2023–24	Moldovan National Division	22	4	4	0	10	1	—		36	5
Sheriff Tiraspol	Total		29	4	8	0	10	1	0	0	47	5
Career total			327	105	28	7	37	4	9	2	401	118

== Honours ==
Sheriff Tiraspol

- Moldovan National Division: 2013–14, 2016–17, 2022–23
- Moldovan Cup: 2014–15, 2016–17, 2022–23
- Moldovan Super Cup: 2015

Tosno

- Russian Cup: 2017–18

Individual

- Moldovan National Division top scorer: 2014–15, 2016–17
