= Alexandru A. Grosu =

Moldovan footballer

Alexandru Grosu
Personal information
- Full name: Alexandru Grosu
- Date of birth: 18 April 1988 (age 38)
- Place of birth: Chișinău, Moldavian SSR
- Height: 1.73 m (5 ft 8 in)
- Position: Midfielder

Team information
- Current team: Spartanii Selemet
- Number: 23

Senior career*
Years	Team	Apps	(Gls)
2007–2008	Iskra-Stal Rîbnița	17	(2)
2008–2011	Rapid Ghidighici	96	(9)
2011–2014	Tiraspol	84	(16)
2014–2015	Zimbru Chișinău	11	(1)
2015–2018	Zaria Bălți	42	(3)
2019 -	Spartanii Selemet	3	(0)

International career
2009–2010	Moldova U21	8	(0)
- * Club domestic league appearances and goals as of 31 January 2014

Alexandru Grosu (born 18 April 1988, in Chișinău, Moldavian SSR) is a Moldavian football midfielder who plays for Spartanii Selemet.
