= Djibril Paye =

Guinean footballer

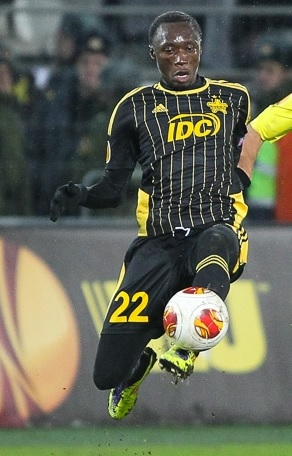

Personal information
- Full name: Djibril Tamsir Paye
- Date of birth: 26 February 1990 (age 36)
- Place of birth: Conakry, Guinea
- Height: 1.82 m (6 ft 0 in)
- Position: Defender

Team information
- Current team: Romorantin

Senior career*
| Years | Team | Apps | (Gls) |
| 2008–2014 | Sheriff Tiraspol | 23 | (0) |
| 2009–2013 | → FC Tiraspol (loan) | 118 | (2) |
| 2014–2015 | Zulte Waregem | 2 | (0) |
| 2016–2020 | Saint-Pryvé Saint-Hilaire | 68 | (1) |
| 2020– | Romorantin | 39 | (0) |

International career
| 2014–2015 | Guinea | 3 | (0) |
- * Club domestic league appearances and goals as of 01:54, 14 April 2022 (UTC)

Djibril Tamsir Paye (born 26 February 1990) is a Guinean professional footballer who plays as a defender for Championnat National 3 club Romorantin. He played three matches for the Guinea national team from 2014 to 2015.

== Club career ==
In September 2008, Paye signed for Sheriff Tiraspol of Moldova.

In July 2014, Paye moved to Belgium side Zulte Waregem.

== Honours ==
Sheriff Tiraspol

- Moldovan National Division: 2013–14
- Moldovan Cup: 2008-09
- Moldovan Super Cup: 2013
- CIS Cup: 2009

FC Tiraspol

- Moldovan Cup: 2012–13
