= Valeriu Macrițchii =

Moldovan footballer

Valerii Macrițchii
Personal information
- Date of birth: 13 February 1996 (age 30)
- Place of birth: Bălți, Moldova
- Height: 1.86 m (6 ft 1 in)
- Positions: Centre back; midfielder

Team information
- Current team: Minaur Baia Mare
- Number: 13

Youth career
- –2012: Sheriff Tiraspol

Senior career*
| Years | Team | Apps | (Gls) |
| 2012–2019 | Sheriff Tiraspol | 34 | (1) |
| 2016–2017 | → Petrocub Hîncești (loan) | 16 | (3) |
| 2017 | → Speranța Nisporeni (loan) | 9 | (0) |
| 2017–2018 | → Petrocub Hîncești (loan) | 23 | (3) |
| 2018 | → Sfântul Gheorghe (loan) | 10 | (0) |
| 2019–2020 | Dinamo-Auto | 27 | (4) |
| 2020–2022 | Ripensia Timișoara | 46 | (3) |
| 2022–2023 | Milsami Orhei | 12 | (0) |
| 2023– | Minaur Baia Mare | 11 | (3) |

International career^{‡}
| 2011–2012 | Moldova U-17 | 6 | (1) |
| 2013–2014 | Moldova U-19 | 6 | (1) |
| 2015–2018 | Moldova U-21 | 28 | (0) |
| 2018– | Moldova | 1 | (0) |
- * Club domestic league appearances and goals as of 13:22, 23 November 2023 (UTC) ‡ National team caps and goals as of 6 September 2018

Valerii Macrițchii (born 13 February 1996) is a Moldovan professional footballer who plays as a midfielder for Minaur Baia Mare.

== International ==
He made his debut for senior Moldova national football team on 26 February 2018 in a friendly against Saudi Arabia.

== Honours ==
FC Sheriff Tiraspol

- Divizia Națională: 2012–13, 2013–14
- Moldovan Cup: 2014–15
- Divizia "A": 2011–12
- Moldovan Super Cup: 2013, 2015

== Personal ==
He is a twin brother of Andrei Macrițchii.
