= Henrique Luvannor =

Moldovan footballer (born 1990)

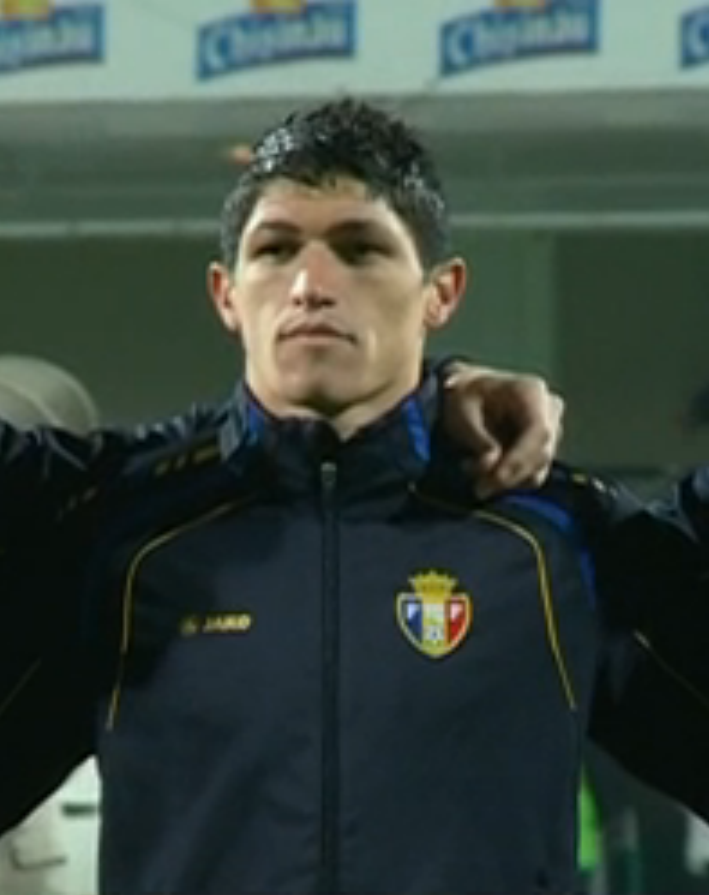
- Luvannor on his debut for Moldova's national team

Personal information
- Full name: Luvannor Henrique de Sousa Silva
- Date of birth: 19 May 1990 (age 36)
- Place of birth: Campo Maior, Piauí, Brazil
- Height: 1.82 m (6 ft 0 in)
- Position: Forward

Team information
- Current team: Al-Jabalain
- Number: 90

Senior career*
Years	Team	Apps	(Gls)
2009	Paranoá	8	(1)
2010−2011	Morrinhos	18	(5)
2011–2014	Sheriff Tiraspol	78	(40)
2014–2017	Al Shabab	67	(25)
2017–2020	Shabab Al-Ahli Dubai	50	(17)
2020–2021	Al Wahda	3	(0)
2021	Sheriff Tiraspol	2	(1)
2021–2022	Al-Taawoun	11	(6)
2022–2023	Cruzeiro	29	(7)
2023	Ceará	22	(2)
2023–2024	Sheriff Tiraspol	12	(7)
2024–2025	Al-Bukiryah	47	(24)
2025–2026	Al-Faisaly	32	(22)
2026–	Al-Jabalain	6	(1)

International career^{‡}
2013–2014	Moldova	4	(2)
- * Club domestic league appearances and goals as of 13 September 2026 ‡ National team caps and goals as of 24 January 2015

Luvannor Henrique de Sousa Silva (born 19 May 1990), commonly known as Luvannor, is a professional footballer who plays as a forward for Saudi Arabian club Al-Jabalain. Born in Brazil, he played for the Moldova national team until ruled out as ineligible by FIFA.

After a few successful seasons with Sheriff Tiraspol in the Moldovan National Division, Luvannor obtained Moldovan citizenship, and in November 2013 he made his debut for Moldova national team in the friendly match against Lithuania on 18 November, in which he played a major role in the equalizing goal in the 72nd minute. His brother, Klysman also played for Sheriff Tiraspol.

== Club career ==
Luvannor began his career with Paranoá Esporte Clube in 2009, playing in the third division of the Campeonato Brasiliense.

Luvannor signed with Moldovan club Sheriff Tiraspol in 2011. Contract is until 2016. In first 2 seasons Luvannor played as a defender and score only 5 goals. The season 2013-2014 was extremely successful for Luvannor. In the first part of Moldavian Football League he scored 18 goals in 18 matches. Also, his team qualified for the Europa League Group Stage. At home, with Anzhi, he scored from a cross. He put in a spectacular performance against Tottenham Hotspur in Tiraspol the best player.

On 1 July 2021, Luvannor returned to FC Sheriff Tiraspol.

On 28 August 2021, Luvannor joined Al-Taawoun. On 8 February 2022, Luvannor was released by Al-Taawoun.

On 3 July 2023, Sheriff Tiraspol announced the return of Luvannor. On 10 January 2024, Sheriff announced the departure of Luvannor alongside Maksym Koval.

On 31 January 2024, Luvannor joined Saudi First Division side Al-Bukiryah.

On 4 August 2025, Luvannor joined Saudi First Division side Al-Faisaly.

== International career ==
In 2013, he acquired Moldovan citizenship and expressed his desire to play for Moldovan national team. In 2012, he married a Moldovan woman. In the third match for the Moldova against Sweden, he scored a goal. He also scored in a friendly match against Andorra.

In the summer of 2014, FIFA announced that Luvannor would not be able to play for the national team of Moldova in qualifying for the European Championship 2016. The reason is the lack of a five-year period of residence in Moldova. However, the Moldova Football Federation sent an official letter to FIFA with a request to make an exception to the rule and has not yet received a reply, football player can not play for the national team.

== Career statistics ==
=== Club ===
As of match played 24 December 2024

Appearances and goals by club, season and competition
Club	Season	League			National cup		League cup		Continental		Other		Total	
Club	Season	Division	Apps	Goals	Apps	Goals	Apps	Goals	Apps	Goals	Apps	Goals	Apps	Goals
Sheriff Tiraspol	2011–12	Divizia Națională	26	9	2	3	–		2 (Note: Appearances in the UEFA Europa League)	0	–		30	12
Sheriff Tiraspol	2012–13	Divizia Națională	24	5	3	1	–		3	0	0 (Note: Appearances in the Moldovan Super Cup)	0	30	6
Sheriff Tiraspol	2013–14	Divizia Națională	27	26	4	1	–		11 (Note: Four appearances and one goal in the UEFA Champions League, seven appearances in the UEFA Europa League)	1	1	0	43	28
Sheriff Tiraspol	2014–15	Divizia Națională	1	0	0	0	–		4 (Note: Four appearances and one goal in the UEFA Champions League, seven appearances in the UEFA Europa League)	1	1	0	6	1
Sheriff Tiraspol	Total		78	40	9	5	0	0	20	2	2	0	109	47
Al Shabab	2014–15	UPL	23	11	3	1	5	1	–		–		31	13
Al Shabab	2014–15	UPL	24	9	0	0	7	4	1 (Note: Appearances in the AFC Champions League)	0	–		32	13
Al Shabab	2016–17	UPL	20	5	1	0	7	10	–		–		28	15
Al Shabab	Total		67	25	4	1	19	15	1	0	0	0	91	41
Shabab Al Ahli	2017–18	UPL	8	2	0	0	5	4	–		–		28	12
Shabab Al Ahli	2018–19	UPL	24	12	4	3	8	3	–		–		31	18
Shabab Al Ahli	2019–20	UPL	18	3	2	0	8	4	–		1	0	30	15
Shabab Al Ahli	Total		50	17	6	3	20	11	0	0	1	0	77	31
Al Wahda	2020–21	UPL	3	0	1	0	1	0	–		–		5	0
Sheriff Tiraspol	2021–22	Divizia Națională	2	1	0	0	–		4 (Note: Appearances in the UEFA Champions League)	4	0	0	6	5
Al Taawoun	2021–22	SPL	11	6	1	0	–		0	0	–		12	6
Cruzeiro	2022	Série B	29	6	2	0	–		–		–		31	6
Ceará	2023	Série B	5	0	2	1	–		–		17 (Note: Ten appearances and one goal in the Copa do Nordeste, seven appearances and one goal in the Campeonato Cearense)	2	24	2
Sheriff Tiraspol	2023–24	Divizia Națională	12	7	1	1	–		12 (Note: Four appearances in the UEFA Champions League, eight appearances and two goals in the UEFA Europa League)	2	-		25	10
Al-Bukiryah	2023–24	SFDL	15	9	0	0	—		—		—		15	9
Al-Bukiryah	2024–25	SFDL	32	14	1	0	—		—		1 (Note: Appearances in the Saudi First Division League play-offs)	0	34	14
Al-Bukiryah	Total		47	23	1	0	0	0	0	0	1	0	49	23
Career total			304	125	27	11	40	26	37	8	21	2	429	172

=== International ===
As of match played 5 March 2014

Appearances and goals by national team and year
National team	Year	Apps	Goals
Moldova	2013	1	0
Moldova	2014	3	2
Total		4	2

Scores and results list Moldova's goal tally first, score column indicates score after each Moldova goal.

List of international goals scored by Henrique Luvannor
No.	Date	Venue	Opponent	Score	Result	Competition	Ref.
1	17 January 2014	Mohammed Bin Zayed Stadium, Abu Dhabi, United Arab Emirates	Sweden	1–0	1–2	Friendly	
2	5 March 2014	Estadi Comunal d'Andorra la Vella, Andorra la Vella, Andorra	Andorra	2–0	3–0	Friendly	

== Honours ==
Sheriff Tiraspol

- Moldovan National Division: 2011–12, 2012–13, 2013–14
- Moldovan Super Cup: 2013

Al Shabab

- GCC Champions League: 2015

Cruzeiro

- Campeonato Brasileiro Série B: 2022

Ceará

- Copa do Nordeste: 2023

Individual

- Moldovan National Division — Best Goalscorer (1) : 2013–14 (26 goals)
