= Alexandru Sergiu Grosu =

Moldovan footballer

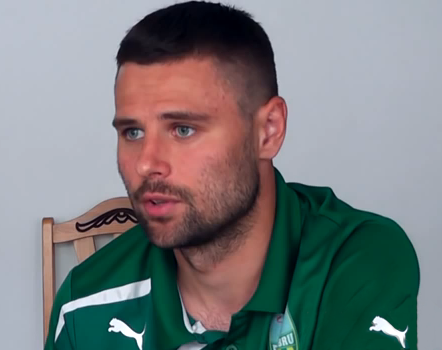
- Alexandru Sergiu Grosu in 2014

Personal information
- Full name: Alexandru Sergiu Grosu
- Date of birth: 16 May 1986 (age 40)
- Place of birth: Chișinău, Moldavian SSR
- Height: 1.80 m (5 ft 11 in)
- Position: Striker

Team information
- Current team: Zaria Bălți
- Number: 21

Senior career*
Years	Team	Apps	(Gls)
2007–2008	Tiligul-Tiras Tiraspol	10	(1)
2008–2011	Rapid Ghidighici	76	(9)
2011–2014	Tiraspol	71	(15)
2014–2015	Zimbru Chișinău	11	(1)
2016	Speranța Nisporeni	10	(2)
2016	Zaria Bălți	41	(3)
2017	TSV Meine 09		

International career
2013–	Moldova	1	(0)
- * Club domestic league appearances and goals as of 30 May 2013

Alexandru Sergiu Grosu (born 16 May 1986, in Chișinău, Moldavian SSR) is a Moldovan football striker who currently plays for Zaria Bălți.

== Honours ==
FC Tiraspol

- Moldovan Cup: 2012/2013

Zimbru Chișinău

- Moldovan Super Cup: 2014
