= Sheriff Arena =

Football stadium in Tiraspol, Moldova

Coordinates: 46°50′18″N 029°33′27″E

- Главная арена спорткомплекса «Шериф», Arena principală a complexului sportiv „Sheriff”
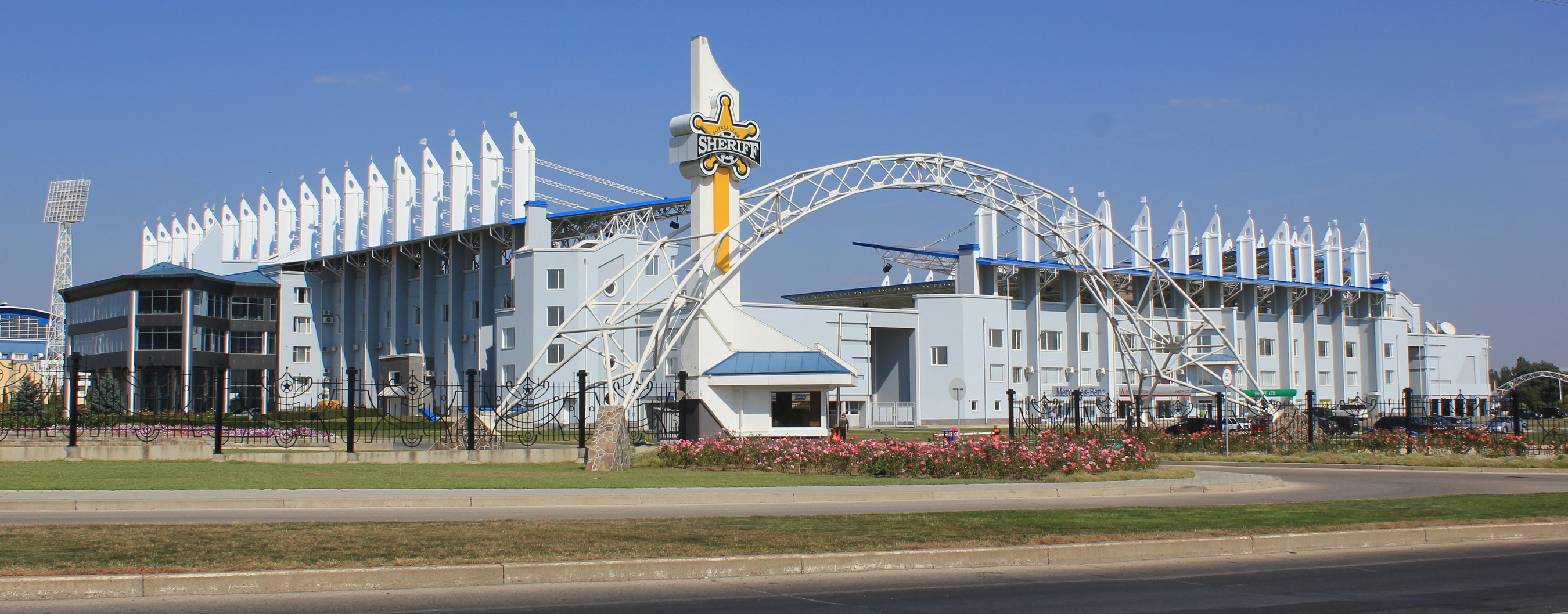
- The arena in 2014; UEFA
- Interactive map of Sheriff Arena
- Address: 1/2 Karl Liebknecht Street; Tiraspol; Moldova
- Owner: Sheriff Tiraspol
- Capacity: 12,746
- Surface: Grass
- Field size: 106 x 69 m

Construction
- Built: August 2000 – May 2002
- Opened: July 2002; 24 years ago
- Renovated: 2011; 15 years ago

Tenants
- Sheriff Tiraspol; FC Tiraspol (2001–2015); Transnistria national football team

Sheriff Arena (Russian: Главная арена спорткомплекса «Шериф»; Romanian: Arena principală a complexului sportiv „Sheriff”) is home to Sheriff Tiraspol, a football team based in Tiraspol, capital of Transnistria, a breakaway region of Moldova. It is owned by the local Sheriff corporation. It has a capacity of 12,746.

The stadium occupies more than 40 hectares and consists of the main field plus five other fields, training fields, a covered indoor arena for winter use as well as a soccer school for children and on-site residences for the players of Sheriff Tiraspol.

In June 2022, UEFA ordered that no European games would be permitted to be played in Transnistria, as a direct consequence of the 2022 Russian invasion of Ukraine. Sheriff played all of their home fixtures in the 2022–23 UEFA Europa League and 2022–23 UEFA Europa Conference League at Zimbru Stadium in Chișinău.

== See also ==
- Malaya Sportivnaya Arena
- Sheriff (company)
- Lists of stadiums
