= 2016–17 FC Sheriff Tiraspol season =

Sheriff Tiraspol
2016–17 season
- Chairman: Viktor Gushan
- Manager: Bruno Irles (22 July – 23 September 2016); Roberto Bordin (from 4 October)
- Stadium: Sheriff Stadium
- Divizia Naţională: 1st
- Moldovan Cup: Winners
- Super Cup: Winners
- Champions League: Second qualifying round
- Top goalscorer: League: Ricardinho (15); All: Ricardinho (16)
Home colours	Away colours

The 2016–17 season is FC Sheriff Tiraspol's 20th season, and their 19th in the Divizia Naţională, the top-flight of Moldovan football.

== Season events ==
Bruno Irles was appointed as the club's new manager on 20 June 2016. On 23 September 2016, Bruno Irles' contract was terminated by mutual consent, with Roberto Bordin being appointed the club's new manager on 4 October 2016.

== Squad ==
As of match played 30 May 2017

No.	Name	Nationality	Position	Date of birth (age)	Signed from	Signed in	Contract ends	Apps.	Goals
Goalkeepers
12	Maxim Bardîș	(Moldova)	GK	16 July 1997 (aged 19)	Trainee	2017		0	0
25	Sergiu Juric	(Moldova)	GK	3 March 1984 (aged 33)	Veris Chișinău	2014			
28	Alexei Koșelev	(Moldova)	GK	19 November 1993 (aged 23)	Tiraspol	2015		50	0
Defenders
3	Ion Jardan	(Moldova)	DF	10 January 1990 (aged 27)	Zimbru Chișinău	2017		11	0
6	Victor Oliveira	(Brazil)	DF	28 May 1994 (aged 23)	Joinville	2016		7	0
17	Artiom Rozgoniuc	(Moldova)	DF	1 October 1995 (aged 21)	Trainee	2013		28	0
19	Serghei Svinarenco	(Moldova)	DF	18 September 1996 (aged 20)	Trainee	2014		25	1
21	Maxim Potîrniche	(Moldova)	DF	13 June 1989 (aged 27)	Zimbru Chișinău	2015		36	0
23	Dionatan Teixeira	(Slovakia)	DF	24 July 1992 (aged 24)	Stoke City	2017		12	0
27	Andrei Macrițchii	(Moldova)	DF	13 February 1996 (aged 21)	Trainee	2013		4	1
37	Vitalie Bordian	(Moldova)	DF	11 August 1984 (aged 32)	Dacia Chișinău	2016		22	0
55	Mateo Sušić	(Bosnia and Herzegovina)	DF	18 November 1990 (aged 26)	Sheriff Tiraspol	2017		70	2
90	Vujadin Savić	(Serbia)	DF	1 July 1990 (aged 26)	Watford	2015		41	5
91	Igor Bondarenco	(Moldova)	DF	28 June 1995 (aged 21)	Trainee	2016		1	0
Midfielders
4	Khalifa Jabbie	(Sierra Leone)	MF	20 January 1993 (aged 24)	Balıkesirspor	2015		36	1
8	Radu Gînsari	(Moldova)	MF	10 December 1991 (aged 25)	Zimbru Chișinău	2014		82	18
11	Ricardinho	(Brazil)	MF	4 September 1989 (aged 27)	Lechia Gdańsk	2013		119	54
14	Wilfried Balima	(Burkina Faso)	MF	20 March 1985 (aged 32)	US Ouagadougou	2005			
18	Ibrahim Koné	(Ivory Coast)	MF	30 January 1995 (aged 22)	loan from Saxan	2017		4	0
20	Cyrille Bayala	(Burkina Faso)	MF	24 May 1996 (aged 21)	El Dakhleya	2016		27	8
24	Seidu Yahaya	(Ghana)	MF	31 December 1989 (aged 27)	Astra Giurgiu	2015		51	0
30	Josip Brezovec	(Croatia)	MF	12 March 1986 (aged 31)	HNK Rijeka	2016		33	13
32	Evgheni Oancea	(Moldova)	MF	5 January 1996 (aged 21)	Trainee	2016		14	2
33	Mihail Caimacov	(Moldova)	MF	22 July 1998 (aged 18)	Trainee	2016		2	0
34	Ivan Urvanțev	(Moldova)	MF	2 May 1997 (aged 20)	Trainee	2016		25	0
88	Zoran Kvržić	(Bosnia and Herzegovina)	MF	7 August 1988 (aged 28)	loan from HNK Rijeka	2016		29	5
Forwards
7	Jô Santos	(Brazil)	FW	31 March 1991 (aged 26)	Zimbru Chișinău	2016		14	4
9	Vladimir Ambros	(Moldova)	FW	30 December 1993 (aged 23)	loan from Petrocub Hîncești	2016		6	0
29	Eugeniu Rebenja	(Moldova)	FW	5 March 1995 (aged 22)	Tiraspol	2015		38	11
39	Ziguy Badibanga	(Belgium)	FW	26 November 1991 (aged 25)	Omonia Nicosia	2017		12	1
99	Vitalie Damașcan	(Moldova)	FW	24 January 1999 (aged 18)	Zimbru Chișinău	2017		8	6
	Andrei Cobeț	(Moldova)	FW	3 January 1997 (aged 20)	Trainee	2015		0	0
	Artiom Puntus	(Moldova)	FW	3 January 1997 (aged 20)	Trainee	2015		2	0
Players away on loan
16	Vadim Paireli	(Moldova)	MF	8 November 1995 (aged 21)	Trainee	2013		66	6
18	Valeriu Macrițchii	(Moldova)	MF	13 February 1996 (aged 21)	Trainee	2013		39	2
	Dmitri Semirov	(Moldova)	MF	27 December 1995 (aged 21)	Trainee	2012		9	1
Left during the season
1	Bozhidar Mitrev	(Bulgaria)	GK	31 March 1987 (aged 30)	Lokomotiv Sofia	2015		14	0
3	Fidan Aliti	(Albania)	DF	3 October 1993 (aged 23)	Luzern	2015		13	0
9	Josip Ivančić	(Croatia)	FW	29 March 1991 (aged 26)	HNK Rijeka	2016		26	11
15	Marcel Metoua	(Ivory Coast)	DF	15 November 1988 (aged 28)	Banat Zrenjanin	2011		150	10
17	Vladislav Ivanov	(Moldova)	MF	7 May 1990 (aged 27)	Dinamo-Auto Tiraspol	2016			
22	Amer Dupovac	(Bosnia and Herzegovina)	DF	29 May 1991 (aged 26)	Sarajevo	2015		21	1
26	Dino Škvorc	(Croatia)	DF	2 February 1990 (aged 27)	Hapoel Kfar Saba	2016		19	1
31	Danijel Subotić	(Switzerland)	FW	31 January 1989 (aged 28)	Qadsia	2015		40	17

=== Out on loan ===
Note: Flags indicate national team as defined under FIFA eligibility rules; some limited exceptions apply. Players may hold more than one non-FIFA nationality.

No. / Pos. / Nation / Player; 16 / FW / MDA / Vadim Paireli (at Dugopolje)	No. / Pos. / Nation / Player; 18 / DF / MDA / Valerii Macrițchii (at Speranța Nisporeni)

== Transfers ==
=== In ===
Date	Position	Nationality	Name	From	Fee	Ref.
14 June 2016	MF	(Moldova)	Vladislav Ivanov	Dinamo-Auto Tiraspol	Undisclosed	
4 July 2016	MF	(Croatia)	Josip Brezovec	HNK Rijeka	Undisclosed	
7 July 2016	DF	(Croatia)	Dino Škvorc	Hapoel Kfar Saba	Undisclosed	
1 August 2016	DF	(Moldova)	Vitalie Bordian	Dacia Chișinău	Undisclosed	
17 August 2016	DF	(Brazil)	Victor Oliveira	Joinville	Undisclosed	
31 August 2016	MF	(Burkina Faso)	Cyrille Bayala	El Dakhleya	Undisclosed	
30 September 2016	MF	(Moldova)	Maxim Potîrniche		Free	
25 January 2017	DF	(Moldova)	Ion Jardan	Zimbru Chișinău	Undisclosed	
30 January 2017	FW	(Belgium)	Ziguy Badibanga	Omonia Nicosia	Undisclosed	
16 February 2017	DF	(Slovakia)	Dionatan Teixeira	Stoke City	Undisclosed	
18 February 2017	DF	(Bosnia and Herzegovina)	Mateo Sušić		Free	
21 February 2017	DF	(Moldova)	Arthur Krechun	Zimbru Chișinău	Undisclosed	

=== Out ===
Date	Position	Nationality	Name	To	Fee	Ref.
1 July 2016	DF	(Australia)	Antony Golec	Persepolis	Undisclosed	

=== Loans in ===
Date from	Position	Nationality	Name	From	Date to	Ref.
6 July 2016	MF	(Bosnia and Herzegovina)	Zoran Kvržić	HNK Rijeka	17 June 2017	
22 February 2017	MF	(Ivory Coast)	Ibrahim Koné	Saxan	End of Season	
9 March 2017	FW	(Moldova)	Vladimir Ambros	Petrocub Hîncești	17 June 2017	

=== Loans out ===
Date from	Position	Nationality	Name	To	Date to	Ref.
21 January 2016	MF	(Brazil)	Ricardinho	Al-Sharjah	5 July 2016	
27 July 2016	MF	(Moldova)	Vadim Paireli	NK Dugopolje	End of Season	
27 July 2016	MF	(Moldova)	Valeriu Macrițchii	Petrocub Hîncești	1 March 2017	
1 September 2016	FW	(Moldova)	Artiom Puntus	Saxan	11 January 2017	
1 September 2016	DF	(Moldova)	Andrei Macrițchii	Petrocub Hîncești	11 January 2017	
Summer 2016	DF	(Moldova)	Artiom Rozgoniuc	Speranța Nisporeni	11 January 2017	
1 March 2017	MF	(Moldova)	Valeriu Macrițchii	Speranța Nisporeni	End of Season	

=== Released ===
Date	Position	Nationality	Name	Joined	Date
14 June 2016	DF	(Moldova)	Constantin Bogdan	Spartaks Jūrmala	
6 July 2016	MF	(Moldova)	Artur Pătraș	Petrocub Hîncești	
1 August 2016	MF	(Bosnia and Herzegovina)	Goran Galešić	Khimki	
1 September 2016	DF	(Albania)	Fidan Aliti	Slaven Belupo	
1 September 2016	DF	(Bosnia and Herzegovina)	Amer Dupovac	RNK Split	
Summer 2016	GK	(Moldova)	Denis Macogonenco	Kyzyltash Bakhchisaray	
Summer 2016	MF	(Brazil)	Bruno Pelissari	Delhi Dynamos	
22 December 2016	DF	(Ivory Coast)	Marcel Metoua		
9 January 2017	DF	(Croatia)	Dino Škvorc	RNK Split	
9 January 2017	FW	(Croatia)	Josip Ivančić	Hapoel Ashkelon	
10 January 2017	DF	(Bosnia and Herzegovina)	Mateo Sušić	Sheriff Tiraspol	18 February 2019
10 January 2017	MF	(Moldova)	Vladislav Ivanov	Krumkachy Minsk	
18 January 2017	FW	(Moldova)	Maxim Iurcu	Speranța Nisporeni	
28 January 2017	FW	(Switzerland)	Danijel Subotić	Gabala	31 January 2017
Winter 2017	GK	(Bulgaria)	Bozhidar Mitrev	Levski Sofia	

== Competitions ==
=== Moldovan Super Cup ===
10 August 2016	Sheriff Tiraspol	3–1	Zaria Bălți	Tiraspol
19:00 EEST (UTC+3)	Subotić 18', 82' (pen.); Sušić (yellow card) 51'; Rebenja 90+1'	Report	Bugaiov 20' (red card) 71'; Onica (yellow card) 34'; Golovatenco (yellow card) 72'; Mihaliov (yellow card) 84'; Suvorov (yellow card) 88'	Stadium: Sheriff Stadium; Attendance: 3,000; Referee: Piotr Stoianov

=== Divizia Națională ===
==== Results summary ====
Overall								Home						Away					
Pld	W	D	L	GF	GA	GD	Pts	W	D	L	GF	GA	GD	W	D	L	GF	GA	GD
30	22	3	5	71	15	+56	69	12	0	3	44	7	+37	10	3	2	27	8	+19

Last updated: 21 May 2017.
Source: See Results

==== Results ====
23 July 2016 1	Sheriff Tiraspol	1–2	Zaria Bălți	Tiraspol
19:00 EEST (UTC+3)	Kvržić 9'; Aliti (yellow card) 55'; Gînsari (yellow card) 90+2'	Report	Novicov (yellow card) 18' (goal) 47'; Mihaliov (yellow card) 33'; Gómez (yellow card) 69'; Picușceac (yellow card) 72'; Bugaiov 89'	Stadium: The Small Arena; Attendance: 2,000; Referee: Veaceslav Banari

30 July 2016 2	Dinamo-Auto Tiraspol	0–1	Sheriff Tiraspol	Tiraspol
18:00 EEST (UTC+3)		Report	Brezovec (yellow card) 28'; Gînsari (yellow card) 84'; Rebenja 90+3'	Stadium: Dinamo-Auto Stadium; Attendance: 250; Referee: Petru Stoianov

6 August 2016 3	Sheriff Tiraspol	7–0	Ungheni	Tiraspol
19:00 EEST (UTC+3)	Savić 4'; Rebenja 32'; Brezovec 52' (pen.); Kvržić 58', 83'; Iurcu 70'; Jabbie 74'	Report	P.Postoroncă (yellow card) 90'	Stadium: The Small Arena; Attendance: 2,000; Referee: Ion Orlic

14 August 2016 4	Sheriff Tiraspol	3–0	Saxan Gagauz Yeri	Tiraspol
18:00 EEST (UTC+3)	Brezovec 20', 44'; Subotić 79'	Report	V.Haritov (yellow card) 19'; M.Gnolou (yellow card) 75'	Stadium: The Small Arena; Attendance: 1,500; Referee: Ghenadie Sidenco

20 August 2016 5	Sheriff Tiraspol	3–0	Zimbru Chișinău	Tiraspol
18:00 EEST (UTC+3)	Anton 54' (o.g.); Sušić 61'; Jabbie (yellow card) 64'; Kvržić 88'	Report	Spătaru (yellow card) 20'	Stadium: The Small Arena; Attendance: 2,300; Referee: Gabriel Tupicico

10 September 2016 6	Sheriff Tiraspol	2–0	Milsami Orhei	Tiraspol
18:00 EEST (UTC+3)	Bordian (yellow card) 33'; Brezovec 44' (pen.); Škvorc 58'; Urvanțev (yellow card) 69'	Report	Cojocari (yellow card) 20'; Bolohan (yellow card) 69'; Jajcinovic (yellow card) 90'	Stadium: The Small Arena; Attendance: 200; Referee: Petru Stoianov

17 September 2016 7	Academia Chișinău	0–1	Sheriff Tiraspol	Ghidighici
16:00 EEST (UTC+3)	C.Țîbuleac (yellow card) 23'; V.Patrașco (yellow card) 79'	Report	C.Jalbă 13' (o.g.); Sušić (yellow card) 26'; Subotić (yellow card) 76'; Ivanov (yellow card) 88'	Stadium: Ghidighici Stadium; Attendance: 200; Referee: Iurie Rochin

21 September 2016 8	Dacia Chișinău	3–0	Sheriff Tiraspol	Speia
16:00 EEST (UTC+3)	Feshchuk 16', 61'; Isa (yellow card) 35'; Cojocaru 68'	Report	Rebenja (yellow card) 42'; Bordian (yellow card) 52'	Stadium: Stadionul Moldova; Attendance: 400; Referee: Gabriel Tupicico

25 September 2106 9	Sheriff Tiraspol	2–0	Speranța Nisporeni	Tiraspol
16:00 EEST (UTC+3)	Brezovec (yellow card) 16'; Subotić 42'; Balima 50'	Report	O.Lupușor (yellow card) 39'; D.Andronic (yellow card) 89'	Stadium: The Small Arena; Attendance: 1,500; Referee: Alexandr Tean

16 October 2016 10	Petrocub Hîncești	0–0	Sheriff Tiraspol	Hîncești
15:00 EEST (UTC+3)	Focșa (yellow card) 77'; A.Rusu (yellow card) 84'	Report	Ricardinho (yellow card) 51'; Potîrniche (yellow card) 86'	Stadium: Stadionul Orășenesc; Attendance: 300; Referee: Iurie Rochin

21 October 2016 11	Zaria Bălți	0–0	Sheriff Tiraspol	Bălți
15:00 EEST (UTC+3)	Țîgîrlaș (yellow card) 54'; Mihaliov (yellow card) 85'	Report	Ricardinho (yellow card) 84'; Subotić (yellow card) 90+2'	Stadium: Stadionul Orășenesc; Attendance: 1,500; Referee: Gabriel Tupicico

30 October 2016 12	Sheriff Tiraspol	3–0	Dinamo-Auto Tiraspol	Tiraspol
15:00 EET (UTC+2)	Brezovec 12'; Ricardinho 34'; Urvanțev (yellow card) 54'; Subotić 70'; Škvorc (yellow card) 90'	Report	Scripcenco (yellow card) 13'	Stadium: The Small Arena; Attendance: 700; Referee: Vladislav Ivancenco

5 November 2016 13	Ungheni	1–2	Sheriff Tiraspol	Nisporeni
14:00 EET (UTC+2)	Maneacov (yellow card) 38'; Lacusta 55'; O.Vatavu (yellow card) 57'; R.Gușan (yellow card) 68'; A.Bezimov (yellow card) 78'; I.Arabadji (red card) 90'	Report	Potîrniche (yellow card) 9'; Ricardinho 25'; Urvanțev (yellow card) 71'; Rebenja 83'; Ivančić (yellow card) 87'	Stadium: Stadionul Mircea Eliade; Attendance: 200; Referee: Ghenadie Sidenco

20 November 2016 14	Saxan Gagauz Yeri	1–5	Sheriff Tiraspol	Ceadîr-Lunga
13:00 EET (UTC+2)	Soro (yellow card) 17'; Sandu (yellow card) 23'; Fofana 52'	Report	Brezovec 21' (pen.), 76'; Kvržić 63'; Rebenja 72'; Svinarenco 88'	Stadium: Ceadîr-Lunga Stadium; Attendance: 1,650; Referee: Gheorghe Malinovschii

26 November 2016 15	Zimbru Chișinău	1–4	Sheriff Tiraspol	Chișinău
13:00 EET (UTC+2)	Rusnac 5'; Monday (yellow card) 7'; Crăciun (yellow card) 53'; Theodoro (yellow card) 60'	Report	Brezovec 19' (pen.); Ricardinho 25', 50'; Gînsari 68'; Rebenja (yellow card) 75'	Stadium: Zimbru Stadium; Attendance: 950; Referee: Alexandr Tean

30 November 2016 16	Sheriff Tiraspol	1–0	Dacia Chișinău	Tiraspol
13:00 EET (UTC+2)	Gînsari 31'; Jabbie (yellow card) 72'	Report	Sarmov (yellow card) 75'; Posmac (yellow card) 80'	Stadium: The Small Arena; Attendance: 400; Referee: Vladislav Ivancenco

4 December 2016 17	Milsami Orhei	2–1	Sheriff Tiraspol	Orhei
13:00 EET (UTC+2)	Andronic 9' (yellow card) 37'; Rebenja 34' (o.g.); Antoniuc (yellow card) 51'; Sidorenco (yellow card) 85'; Cojocari (yellow card) 88'	Report	Ivančić 64'; Kvržić (yellow card) 90+4'	Stadium: CSR Orhei; Attendance: 700; Referee: Veaceslav Banari

10 December 2016 18	Sheriff Tiraspol	1–0	Academia Chișinău	Tiraspol
17:00 EET (UTC+2)	Brezovec 14'	Report	Vremea (yellow card) 44'; V.Patrașco (yellow card) 66'; Bîrdan (yellow card) 90'; M.Apostol (yellow card) 90+1'	Stadium: The Small Arena; Attendance: 950; Referee: Ghenadie Sidenco

24 February 2017 19	Speranța Nisporeni	0–2	Sheriff Tiraspol	Nisporeni
13:00 EET (UTC+2)	Diulgher (yellow card) 89'	Report	Oancea 3'; Brezovec 41'; Jardan (yellow card) 77'	Stadium: Stadionul Mircea Eliade; Attendance: 400; Referee: Gabriel Tupicico

4 March 2017 20	Sheriff Tiraspol	4–0	Petrocub Hîncești	Tiraspol
16:00 EET (UTC+2)	Bayala 12'; Ricardinho 27', 53'; Brezovec 35'	Report		Stadium: The Small Arena; Attendance: 2,000; Referee: Petru Stoianov

11 March 2017 21	Sheriff Tiraspol	5–0	Milsami Orhei	Tiraspol
16:00 EET (UTC+2)	Brezovec (yellow card) 1' (goal) 6'; Badibanga 24'; Savić 35'; Jardan (yellow card) 48'; Bayala 50'; Gînsari 79'; Urvanțev (yellow card) 81'	Report	Sidorenco (yellow card) 23'; Boiciuc (yellow card) 74'; Antoniuc (yellow card) 78'	Stadium: The Small Arena; Attendance: 2,200; Referee: Gabriel Tupicico

16 March 2017 22	Zaria Bălți	0–2	Sheriff Tiraspol	Bălți
14:00 EET (UTC+2)	Onica (yellow card) 45'	Report	Oancea 11'; Savić (yellow card) 70'; Ricardinho 82'	Stadium: Stadionul Orășenesc; Attendance: 1,500; Referee: Petru Stoianov

5 April 2017 23	Sheriff Tiraspol	0–1	Dacia Chișinău	Tiraspol
18:00 EEST (UTC+3)	Bordian (yellow card) 78'; Potîrniche (yellow card) 86'; Oancea (yellow card) 86'	Report	Cojocaru 74'; Sarmov (yellow card) 87'; Celeadnic (yellow card) 90+4'	Stadium: The Small Arena; Attendance: 4,500; Referee: Gabriel Tupicico

9 April 2017 24	Zimbru Chișinău	0–1	Sheriff Tiraspol	Chișinău
17:00 EEST (UTC+3)	Rusnac (yellow card) 90+2'	Report	Gînsari (yellow card) 71'; Damașcan 76'	Stadium: Zimbru Stadium; Attendance: 3,000; Referee: Alexandr Tean

14 April 2017 25	Sheriff Tiraspol	1–2	Academia Chișinău	Tiraspol
18:00 EEST (UTC+3)	Savić (yellow card) 60'; Ricardinho 66' (yellow card) 90+3'; Teixeira (yellow card) 90+4'	Report	Roșca 6' (yellow card) 90+4'; M.Apostol (yellow card) 53'; Andronic (yellow card) 55'; Vremea 84'; Stefu (yellow card) 86'; D.Danu (yellow card) 90+4'	Stadium: The Small Arena; Attendance: 1,000; Referee: Andrei Cojocaru

30 April 2017 30	Sheriff Tiraspol	4–1	Speranța Nisporeni	Tiraspol
17:00 EEST (UTC+3)	Ricardinho 4', 14', 60'; Teixeira (yellow card) 46'; Bayala 68'; Savić (yellow card) 89'	Report	Efros (yellow card) 3'; Plătică 76'	Stadium: The Small Arena; Attendance: 1,000; Referee: Gabriel Tupicico

3 May 2017 26	Petrocub Hîncești	0–2	Sheriff Tiraspol	Hîncești
17:00 EEST (UTC+3)	K.Ndi (yellow card) 22'; Douanla (yellow card) 76'	Report	Bayala 17'; Teixeira (yellow card) 24'; Ricardinho	Stadium: Stadionul Orășenesc; Attendance: 800; Referee: Vladislav Ivancenco

7 May 2017 27	Dinamo-Auto Tiraspol	0–0	Sheriff Tiraspol	Ghidighici
17:00 EEST (UTC+3)	Casian (yellow card) 18'; V.Negara (yellow card) 43'; V.Vatav (yellow card) 45+2'; Gheorghiev (yellow card) 72'; Bugneac (yellow card) 73'; Cheptine (yellow card) 78'; Moșneaga (yellow card) 85'; Jardan (yellow card) 87'	Report	Ricardinho (yellow card) 47'; Teixeira (yellow card) 51'; Brezovec (yellow card) 61'; Potîrniche (yellow card) 80'; Cheptine (yellow card) 78'; Jardan (yellow card) 90+5'	Stadium: Ghidighici Stadium; Attendance: 400; Referee: Petru Stoianov

12 May 2017 28	Sheriff Tiraspol	7–1	Saxan Gagauz Yeri	Tiraspol
18:00 EEST (UTC+3)	Savić 3'; Gînsari 23'; Damașcan (yellow card) 35' (goal) 45+1', 70'; Bayala 39'; Joálisson 89', 90+2'	Report	Șumchin 57'; A.Colibaba (red card) 67'	Stadium: Sheriff Stadium; Attendance: 2,500; Referee: Veaceslav Banari

21 May 2017 29	Ungheni	0–6	Sheriff Tiraspol	Chișinău
18:00 EEST (UTC+3)	I.Pavlov (yellow card) 32'; S.Ciuico (yellow card) 67'; V.Negru (yellow card) 80'	Report	Damașcan 11' (yellow card) 31'; Brezovec (yellow card) 13'; Ricardinho 28', 56', 90+2'; V.Negru 53' (o.g.); Bayala 77'	Stadium: Zimbru Stadium; Attendance: 200; Referee: Andrei Ceban

==== League table ====
Pos	Team	Pld	W	D	L	GF	GA	GD	Pts	Qualification or relegation
1	Sheriff Tiraspol (C)	30	22	3	5	71	15	+56	69 (Note: According to section 10.5 of the Moldovan Football Championship Regulations, 2016-2017 Edition, an extra match was played to determine the Moldovan champions. The match was played on 30 May 2017 and was won by Sheriff Tiraspol who became league champions.)	Qualification for the Champions League second qualifying round
2	Dacia Chișinău	30	22	3	5	54	15	+39	69	Qualification for the Europa League first qualifying round (Note: Since the winners of 2016–17 Moldovan Cup, Sheriff Tiraspol, qualified for European competition based on their league position, the spot awarded to the Cup winner (Europa League first qualifying round) was passed to the next best-placed team (in this case to the fourth-placed team).)
3	Milsami Orhei	30	22	2	6	57	20	+37	68	Qualification for the Europa League first qualifying round
4	Zaria Bălți	30	20	5	5	56	21	+35	65	Qualification for the Europa League first qualifying round
5	Zimbru Chișinău	30	13	7	10	32	29	+3	46	

Source: FMF, UEFA, Soccerway
Rules for classification: 1) Points; 2) Play-off (only if deciding champion when two teams tied); 3) Head-to-head points; 4) Head-to-head goal difference; 5) Head-to-head away goals scored; 6) Head-to-head goals scored; 7) Matches won; 8) Goal difference; 9) Goals scored; 10) Fairplay ranking.
(C) Champions

==== Golden Match ====
30 May 2017	Sheriff Tiraspol	1–1 (a.e.t.) (3–0 p)	Dacia Chișinău	Chișinău
20:00 EEST (UTC+3)	Damașcan 37' (yellow card) 87'; Jardan (yellow card) 41'; Sušić (yellow card) 87'	Report	Pașcenco (yellow card) 46'; Posmac 73'	Stadium: Zimbru Stadium; Attendance: 6,615; Referee: Veaceslav Banari
	Penalties
	Ricardinho (penalty scored); Teixeira (penalty scored); Oancea (penalty scored)		(penalty missed) Sarmov; (penalty missed) Isa; (penalty missed) Palavandishvili

=== Moldovan Cup ===
25 October 2016 Round of 16	Sheriff Tiraspol	13–0	Codru Lozova	Tiraspol
15:00 EEST (UTC+3)	Ivančić 2', 21', 44', 45'; Savić 25'; Ivanov 32', 35', 36', 64'; Bayala 39'; Ricardinho 63'; Rebenja 67'; Gînsari 88'	Report	Mircea (yellow card) 69'	Stadium: The Small Arena; Attendance: 200; Referee: Andrei Ceban

26 April 2017 Quarterfinal	Milsami Orhei	0–1	Sheriff Tiraspol	Orhei
15:30 EEST (UTC+3)	Andronic (yellow card) 54'; Bolohan (yellow card) 54'; Mîțu (yellow card) 90+4'	Report	Jardan (yellow card) 30' (yellow-red card) 90+2'; Gînsari 62'; Juric (yellow card) 81'; Jabbie (yellow card) 90+3'	Stadium: CSR; Attendance: 600; Referee: Veaceslav Banari

16 May 2017 Semifinal	Petrocub-Hîncești	1–1 (a.e.t.) (4–5 p)	Sheriff Tiraspol	Hîncești
17:00 EEST (UTC+3)	Calugher 11'; Antoniuc (yellow card) 15'; A.Rusu (yellow card) 23'; V.Rusu (yellow card) 57' (yellow-red card) 101'	Report	Ricardinho (yellow card) 33'; Savić 39'; Bayala (yellow card) 41'; Sušić (yellow card) 107'	Stadium: Orășenesc; Attendance: 1,500
	Penalties
	Penalty scored Penalty missed		Penalty scored

==== Final ====
25 May 2017	Sheriff Tiraspol	5–0	Zaria Bălți	Chișinău
20:00 EEST (UTC+3)	Damașcan 49', 59'; Bayala 54', 56' (yellow card) 55'; Joálisson 89'	Report	Mihaliov (yellow card) 12'; Rață (yellow card) 64'; Gómez (yellow card) 68'	Stadium: Zimbru Stadium; Attendance: 6,900; Referee: Alper Ulusoy

=== UEFA Champions League ===
==== Qualifying rounds ====
12 July 2016 Second qualifying round 1st leg	Hapoel Be'er Sheva (Israel)	3–2	(Moldova) Sheriff Tiraspol	Be'er Sheva, Israel
20:50 EEST (UTC+3)	Hoban (yellow card) 4'; Ogu 43'; Barda 52' (pen.); Taha (yellow card) 61'; Melikson (yellow card) 87'; Radi 90' (pen.)	Report	Aliti (yellow card) 9' (yellow-red card) 26'; Ivančić 22'; Dupovac (yellow card) 51'; Brezovec 64'	Stadium: Turner Stadium; Attendance: 15,939; Referee: Carlos del Cerro Grande (Spain)

19 July 2016 Second qualifying round 2nd leg	Sheriff Tiraspol (Moldova)	0–0 (2–3 agg.)	(Israel) Hapoel Be'er Sheva	Tiraspol, Moldova
20:00 EEST (UTC+3)	Kvržić (yellow card) 20'; Metoua (yellow card) 21'; Gînsari (yellow card) 77'; Ivančić (yellow card) 87'	Report	Ogu (yellow card) 20'; Hoban (yellow card) 42' (yellow-red card) 90+4'; Goresh (yellow card) 83'	Stadium: Sheriff Stadium; Attendance: 8,184; Referee: Daniel Stefański (Poland)

== Squad statistics ==
As of Match played 30 May 2017

=== Appearances and goals ===
No.	Pos	Nat	Player	Total		Divizia Națională		Moldovan Cup		Moldovan Super Cup		Champions League	
No.	Pos	Nat	Player	Apps	Goals	Apps	Goals	Apps	Goals	Apps	Goals	Apps	Goals
3	DF	(Moldova) MDA	Ion Jardan	11	0	9	0	1+1	0	0	0	0	0
4	MF	(Sierra Leone) SLE	Khalifa Jabbie	24	1	13+7	1	2+1	0	1	0	0	0
6	DF	(Brazil) BRA	Victor Oliveira	7	0	5+2	0	0	0	0	0	0	0
7	MF	(Brazil) BRA	Jô Santos	7	3	0+5	2	0+2	1	0	0	0	0
8	MF	(Moldova) MDA	Radu Gînsari	30	6	15+8	4	4	2	1	0	2	0
9	FW	(Moldova) MDA	Vladimir Ambros	6	0	2+3	0	1	0	0	0	0	0
11	MF	(Brazil) BRA	Ricardinho	33	16	23+4	15	3	1	1	0	1+1	0
14	DF	(Burkina Faso) BFA	Wilfried Balima	25	1	17+6	1	1	0	0+1	0	0	0
17	DF	(Moldova) MDA	Artiom Rozgoniuc	4	0	1+2	0	1	0	0	0	0	0
18	MF	(Ivory Coast) CIV	Ibrahim Koné	4	0	0+2	0	0+2	0	0	0	0	0
19	DF	(Moldova) MDA	Serghei Svinarenco	6	1	2+2	1	0+1	0	0+1	0	0	0
20	MF	(Burkina Faso) BFA	Cyrille Bayala	27	8	17+6	5	4	3	0	0	0	0
21	DF	(Moldova) MDA	Maxim Potîrniche	21	0	16+1	0	3+1	0	0	0	0	0
23	DF	(Slovakia) SVK	Dionatan Teixeira	12	0	6+4	0	1+1	0	0	0	0	0
24	MF	(Ghana) GHA	Seidu Yahaya	23	0	16+3	0	2+1	0	0	0	1	0
25	GK	(Moldova) MDA	Sergiu Juric	8	0	5	0	3	0	0	0	0	0
27	DF	(Moldova) MDA	Andrei Macrițchii	1	0	0+1	0	0	0	0	0	0	0
28	GK	(Moldova) MDA	Alexei Koșelev	23	0	22	0	0	0	1	0	0	0
29	FW	(Moldova) MDA	Eugeniu Rebenja	19	6	11+6	4	0+1	1	0+1	1	0	0
30	MF	(Croatia) CRO	Josip Brezovec	33	13	28	12	2	0	1	0	2	1
32	MF	(Moldova) MDA	Evgheni Oancea	14	2	10+3	2	0	0	0	0	1	0
33	MF	(Moldova) MDA	Mihail Caimacov	2	0	0+2	0	0	0	0	0	0	0
34	MF	(Moldova) MDA	Ivan Urvanțev	21	0	7+14	0	0	0	0	0	0	0
37	DF	(Moldova) MDA	Vitalie Bordian	22	0	17+2	0	1+1	0	1	0	0	0
39	FW	(Belgium) BEL	Ziguy Badibanga	12	1	7+2	1	3	0	0	0	0	0
55	DF	(Bosnia and Herzegovina) BIH	Mateo Sušić	27	1	20+1	1	3	0	1	0	2	0
88	MF	(Bosnia and Herzegovina) BIH	Zoran Kvržić	29	5	18+8	5	0+1	0	0	0	2	0
90	DF	(Serbia) SRB	Vujadin Savić	22	5	15+1	3	4	2	0	0	2	0
91	DF	(Moldova) MDA	Igor Bondarenko	1	0	0	0	0+1	0	0	0	0	0
93	FW	(Moldova) MDA	Maxim Iurcu	6	1	1+3	1	0+1	0	1	0	0	0
99	FW	(Moldova) MDA	Vitalie Damașcan	8	6	3+3	4	1+1	2	0	0	0	0
	FW	(Moldova) MDA	Artiom Puntus	2	0	0+1	0	0	0	0	0	0+1	0
Players away on loan :
Players who left Sheriff Tiraspol during the season:
1	GK	(Bulgaria) BUL	Bozhidar Mitrev	7	0	4	0	1	0	0	0	2	0
3	DF	(Albania) ALB	Fidan Aliti	2	0	1	0	0	0	0	0	1	0
9	FW	(Croatia) CRO	Josip Ivančić	12	6	2+7	1	1	4	0	0	2	1
15	DF	(Ivory Coast) CIV	Marcel Metoua	9	0	3+2	0	1	0	1	0	1+1	0
17	MF	(Moldova) MDA	Vladislav Ivanov	11	4	4+6	0	1	4	0	0	0	0
22	DF	(Bosnia and Herzegovina) BIH	Amer Dupovac	1	0	0	0	0	0	0	0	0+1	0
26	DF	(Croatia) CRO	Dino Škvorc	19	1	16	1	0	0	1	0	2	0
31	FW	(Switzerland) SUI	Danijel Subotić	12	5	5+4	3	0	0	1	2	1+1	0

=== Goal scorers ===
Place	Position	Nation	Number	Name	Divizia Națională	Moldovan Cup	Moldovan Super Cup	Champions League	Total
1	MF	(Brazil)	11	Ricardinho	15	0	1	0	16
2	MF	(Croatia)	30	Josip Brezovec	12	0	0	1	13
3	MF	(Burkina Faso)	20	Cyrille Bayala	6	2	1	0	9
4	FW	(Moldova)	99	Vitalie Damașcan	5	2	0	0	7
5	FW	(Moldova)	29	Eugeniu Rebenja	4	1	1	0	6
5	MF	(Moldova)	8	Radu Gînsari	4	1	1	0	6
5	FW	(Croatia)	9	Josip Ivančić	1	4	0	1	6
8	MF	(Bosnia and Herzegovina)	88	Zoran Kvržić	5	0	0	0	5
8	FW	(Switzerland)	31	Danijel Subotić	3	0	2	0	5
8	DF	(Serbia)	90	Vujadin Savić	3	2	0	0	5
11	MF	(Moldova)	17	Vladislav Ivanov	0	4	0	0	4
12	MF	(Brazil)	7	Jô Santos	2	1	0	0	3
12				Own goal	3	0	0	0	3
14	MF	(Moldova)	32	Evgheni Oancea	2	0	0	0	2
15	FW	(Moldova)	93	Maxim Iurcu	1	0	0	0	1
15	MF	(Sierra Leone)	4	Khalifa Jabbie	1	0	0	0	1
15	DF	(Bosnia and Herzegovina)	55	Mateo Sušić	1	0	0	0	1
15	DF	(Croatia)	26	Dino Škvorc	1	0	0	0	1
15	DF	(Burkina Faso)	14	Wilfried Balima	1	0	0	0	1
15	DF	(Moldova)	19	Serghei Svinarenco	1	0	0	0	1
15	FW	(Belgium)	39	Ziguy Badibanga	1	0	0	0	1
				TOTALS	72	20	3	2	97

=== Disciplinary record ===
Number	Nation	Position	Name	Divizia Națională		Moldovan Cup		Moldovan Super Cup		Champions League		Total	
Number	Nation	Position	Name	Yellow card	Red card	Yellow card	Red card	Yellow card	Red card	Yellow card	Red card	Yellow card	Red card
3	(Moldova)	DF	Ion Jardan	4	0	2	1	0	0	0	0	6	1
4	(Sierra Leone)	MF	Khalifa Jabbie	2	0	1	0	0	0	0	0	3	0
8	(Moldova)	MF	Radu Gînsari	3	0	0	0	0	0	1	0	4	0
11	(Brazil)	MF	Ricardinho	4	0	1	0	0	0	0	0	5	0
20	(Burkina Faso)	MF	Cyrille Bayala	0	0	2	0	0	0	0	0	2	0
21	(Moldova)	DF	Maxim Potîrniche	4	0	0	0	0	0	0	0	4	0
23	(Slovakia)	DF	Dionatan Teixeira	4	0	0	0	0	0	0	0	4	0
25	(Moldova)	GK	Sergiu Juric	0	0	1	0	0	0	0	0	1	0
29	(Moldova)	FW	Eugeniu Rebenja	2	0	0	0	0	0	0	0	2	0
30	(Croatia)	MF	Josip Brezovec	5	0	0	0	0	0	0	0	5	0
32	(Moldova)	MF	Evgheni Oancea	1	0	0	0	0	0	0	0	1	0
34	(Moldova)	MF	Ivan Urvanțev	4	0	0	0	0	0	0	0	4	0
37	(Moldova)	DF	Vitalie Bordian	3	0	0	0	0	0	0	0	3	0
55	(Bosnia and Herzegovina)	DF	Mateo Sušić	2	0	1	0	1	0	0	0	4	0
88	(Bosnia and Herzegovina)	MF	Zoran Kvržić	1	0	0	0	0	0	1	0	2	0
90	(Serbia)	DF	Vujadin Savić	3	0	0	0	0	0	0	0	3	0
99	(Moldova)	FW	Vitalie Damașcan	3	0	0	0	0	0	0	0	3	0
Players away from Sheriff Tiraspol on loan:
Players who left Sheriff Tiraspol during the season:
3	(Albania)	DF	Fidan Aliti	1	0	0	0	0	0	2	1	3	1
9	(Croatia)	FW	Josip Ivančić	1	0	0	0	0	0	1	0	2	0
15	(Ivory Coast)	DF	Marcel Metoua	0	0	0	0	0	0	1	0	1	0
17	(Moldova)	MF	Vladislav Ivanov	1	0	0	0	0	0	0	0	1	0
22	(Bosnia and Herzegovina)	DF	Amer Dupovac	0	0	0	0	0	0	1	0	1	0
26	(Croatia)	DF	Dino Škvorc	1	0	0	0	0	0	0	0	1	0
31	(Switzerland)	FW	Danijel Subotić	2	0	0	0	0	0	0	0	2	0
			TOTALS	51	0	8	1	1	0	7	1	67	2
