= 2016–17 Moldovan Cup =

Moldovan association football tournament season

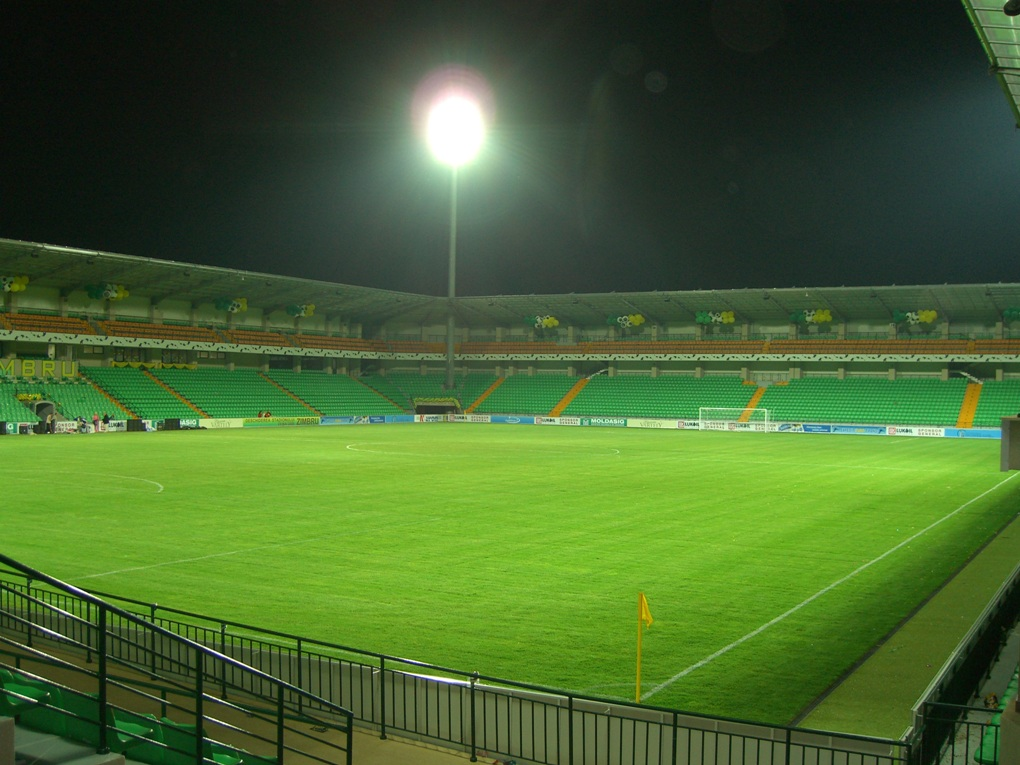
- Zimbru Stadium in Chișinău hosted the final

Tournament details
- Country: Moldova
- Dates: 20 August 2016 – 25 May 2017
- Teams: 51

Final positions
- Champions: Sheriff Tiraspol
- Runners-up: Zaria Bălți

Tournament statistics
- Matches played: 50
- Goals scored: 198 (3.96 per match)

The 2016–17 Moldovan Cup (Romanian: Cupa Moldovei) was the 26th season of the Moldovan annual football tournament. Zaria Bălți entered as the defending champions after winning the 2015–16 edition. The competition started on 20 August 2016 with the first preliminary round and concluded with the final at the Zimbru Stadium on 25 May 2017. Sheriff won a record 9th title following a 5–0 win over Zaria in the final. As winners, Sheriff would have been assured a place for the 2017–2018 UEFA Europa League first qualifying round; however, since they already qualified for the 2017–2018 UEFA Champions League second qualifying round by winning the title in the Divizia Națională, the Europa League entry went to Zaria Bălți, the highest team in the Divizia Națională table which had not already qualified for European competitions.

== Format and Schedule ==
51 clubs entered this season's competition, an increase of four clubs compared with the 2015–16 total of 47 clubs. Both preliminary rounds and the first two rounds proper were regionalised to reduce teams travel costs. All ties level after 90 minutes used extra time to determine the winner, with a penalty shoot-out to follow if necessary.

Round	Match dates	Fixtures	Clubs
First Preliminary Round	20 August 2016	14	51 → 37
Second Preliminary Round	23 August 2016	2	37 → 35
First Round	3 September 2016	12	35 → 23
Second Round	20–21 September 2016	7	23 → 16
Round of 16	25–26 October 2016	8	16 → 8
Quarter-Finals	26 April 2017	4	8 → 4
Semi-Finals	16 May 2017	2	4 → 2
Final	25 May 2017	1	2 → 1

== Participating teams ==
The following teams entered the competition:

Divizia Națională the 11 teams of the 2016–17 season	Divizia A the 12 non-reserve teams of the 2016–17 season	Divizia B the 28 non-reserve teams of the 2016–17 season
Zaria Bălți ^{title holder}; Milsami Orhei ^{runner-up}; Sheriff Tiraspol; Dacia Chișinău; Zimbru Chișinău; Dinamo-Auto Tiraspol; Speranța Nisporeni; Petrocub-Hîncești; Academia Chișinău; Saxan Ceadîr-Lunga; Ungheni	Spicul Chișcăreni; Gagauziya-Oguzsport; Victoria Chișinău; Codru Lozova; Iskra Rîbnița; Edineț; Intersport-Aroma; Sfîntul Gheorghe; Real Succes Chișinău; Prut Leova; Sîngerei; Sparta Selemet	Bogzești; Florești; Cahul-2005; Anina Anenii Noi; Intersport Sănătăuca; CFR Ialoveni; Sireți; Grănicerul Glodeni; Sinteza Căușeni; Congaz; Slobozia Mare; Cruiz Camenca; Fălești; Boldurești; Codru-Juniori; Dava Soroca; Trachia Taraclia; Politeh Chișinău; Cotiujenii Mari; Maiak Chirsova; Cricova; Rîșcani; Nistru Otaci; Orhei Star; Maiac Cioropcani; Ceadîr-Lunga; Speranța Drochia; Sparta Chișinău

Number in brackets denote the level of respective league in Football in Moldova

== First preliminary round ==
28 clubs from the Divizia B entered this round. Teams that finished higher on the league in the previous season played their ties away. All matches were played on 20 August 2016. Teams in bold continue to the next round of the competition.

Team 1	Score	Team 2
**Rîșcani** (3)	4–2 (a.e.t.)	Speranța Drochia (3)
**Intersport Sănătăuca** (3)	1–0	Florești (3)
**Maiac Cioropcani** (3)	2–0	Codru-Juniori (3)
Fălești (3)	0–5	**Grănicerul Glodeni** (3)
**Nistru Otaci** (3)	2–0 (a.e.t.)	Dava Soroca (3)
**Orhei Star** (3)	1–0	Bogzești (3)
Cotiujenii Mari (3)	1–2	**Cruiz Camenca** (3)
Politeh Chișinău (3)	1–8	**Sinteza Căușeni** (3)
Cricova (3)	1–2	**Anina Anenii Noi** (3)
**Sparta Chișinău** (3)	1–0	Boldurești (3)
**Slobozia Mare** (3)	2–1	Cahul-2005 (3)
**Ceadîr-Lunga** (3)	4–0	Trachia Taraclia (3)
**Sireți** (3)	3–0	CFR Ialoveni (3)
Maiak Chirsova (3)	0–2 (a.e.t.)	**Congaz** (3)

== Second preliminary round ==
4 clubs from the Divizia B entered this round. Teams that finished higher on the league in the previous season played their ties away. Matches were played on 23 August 2016. Teams in bold continue to the next round of the competition.
Rîșcani, Intersport Sănătăuca, Maiac Cioropcani, Grănicerul Glodeni, Cruiz Camenca, Sinteza Căușeni, Anina Anenii Noi, Sparta Chișinău, Sireți and Congaz received a bye for the second preliminary round.

Team 1	Score	Team 2
Nistru Otaci (3)	0–1 (a.e.t.)	**Orhei Star** (3)
**Ceadîr-Lunga** (3)	7–2	Slobozia Mare (3)

== First round ==
The 12 winners from the preliminary rounds joined the 12 Divizia A teams. In a match, the home advantage was granted to the team from the lower league. All matches were played on 3 September 2016. Teams in bold continue to the next round of the competition.

Team 1	Score	Team 2
Rîșcani (3)	1–4	**Edineț** (2)
**Intersport Sănătăuca** (3)	1–0	Sîngerei (2)
Maiac Cioropcani (3)	3–5	**Codru Lozova** (2)
Grănicerul Glodeni (3)	0–2	**Spicul Chișcăreni** (2)
Orhei Star (3)	1–2	**Victoria Chișinău** (2)
Cruiz Camenca (3)	1–1 (1–3 p)	**Iskra Rîbnița** (2)
Sinteza Căușeni (3)	0–1 (a.e.t.)	**Intersport-Aroma** (2)
**Anina Anenii Noi** (3)	3–0	Real Succes Chișinău (2)
Sparta Chișinău (3)	2–4	**Sfîntul Gheorghe** (2)
Ceadîr-Lunga (3)	2–2 (2–4 p)	**Prut Leova** (2)
Sireți (3)	2–10	**Sparta Selemet** (2)
Congaz (3)	2–4	**Gagauziya-Oguzsport** (2)

== Second round ==
The 11 winners from the previous round joined the 3 Divizia Națională sides seeded 9-11, Academia, Saxan and Ungheni.
Gagauziya-Oguzsport received a bye for the second round. The home teams and the pairs for 3 Divizia Națională sides were determined in a draw held on 7 September 2016. Matches were played on 20 and 21 September 2016. Teams in bold continue to the next round of the competition.

20 September 2016	Victoria Chișinău (2)	**0–2**	**Spicul Chișcăreni (2)**	Chișinău
		Report	Molla 3' (pen.); A. Țîgîrlaș 55'	Stadium: Joma Arena; Referee: Petru Stoianov

20 September 2016	Iskra Rîbnița (2)	**0–5**	**Saxan Ceadîr-Lunga (1)**	Rîbnița
		Report	Koné 18'; Sandu 26' (pen.); P. Fofana 39'; Puntus 50'; Haritov 83'	Stadium: Orășenesc; Attendance: 200; Referee: Ion Orlic

20 September 2016	**Sfîntul Gheorghe (2)**	**1–0**	Ungheni (1)	Suruceni
	Maxim 90'	Report		Stadium: Suruceni

20 September 2016	Prut Leova (2)	**0–3**	**Sparta Selemet (2)**	Leova
		Report	R. Lazăr 42'; D. Negru 69'; Ciolac 71'	Stadium: Leova Stadium

21 September 2016	**Academia Chișinău (1)**	**6–0**	Edineț (2)	Ghidighici
	O. Andronic 19', 55'; Roșca 49'; V. Andronic 62'; Pîslă 84'; Apostol 87'	Report		Stadium: Ghidighici Stadium; Referee: Dumitru Muntean

21 September 2016	**Codru Lozova (2)**	**1–0**	Intersport Sănătăuca (3)	Chișinău
	C. Lungu 86'	Report		Stadium: CS Real Succes Stadium

21 September 2016	**Anina Anenii Noi (3)**	**2–2** (a.e.t.) (**3–1** p)	Intersport-Aroma (2)	Anenii Noi
	Bucur 34'; Lisnic 75'	Report	Digori 88'; Vdovicenco 90+3'	Stadium: Anenii Noi Stadium

== Final stage ==
=== Bracket ===
Round of 16
Spicul Chișcăreni	0
**Petrocub-Hîncești**	**3**
Speranța Nisporeni	0
**Saxan Ceadîr-Lunga**	**1**
**Milsami Orhei**	**4**
Academia Chișinău	0
**Sheriff Tiraspol**	**13**
Codru Lozova	0
Sparta Selemet	1
**Dacia Chișinău**	**4**
Gagauziya-Oguzsport	1
**Zaria Bălți**	**8**
**Dinamo-Auto Tiraspol**	**3**
Sfîntul Gheorghe	2
**Zimbru Chișinău**	**10**
Anina Anenii Noi	0

Quarter-finals
**Petrocub-Hîncești**	**3**
Saxan Ceadîr-Lunga	0
Milsami Orhei	0
**Sheriff Tiraspol**	**1**
Dacia Chișinău	1 (2)
**Zaria Bălți** (a.e.t.) (p)	**1 (4)**
Dinamo-Auto Tiraspol	0
**Zimbru Chișinău**	**4**

Semi-finals
Petrocub-Hîncești	1 (4)
**Sheriff Tiraspol** (a.e.t.) (p)	**1 (5)**
**Zaria Bălți** (a.e.t.)	**1**
Zimbru Chișinău	0

Final
**Sheriff Tiraspol**	**5**
Zaria Bălți	0

== Round of 16 ==
The 7 winners from the previous round and Gagauziya-Oguzsport joined the remaining 8 Divizia Națională sides seeded 1-8. The home teams and the pairs were determined in a draw held on 23 September 2016. Matches were played on 25 and 26 October 2016. Teams in bold continue to the next round of the competition.

25 October 2016	**Milsami Orhei (1)**	**4–0**	Academia Chișinău (1)	Orhei
13:00 EEST	G. Andronic 17', 54'; Zhigulyov 29'; Racu 61'	Report		Stadium: CSR; Attendance: 400; Referee: Vladislav Ivancenco

25 October 2016	Spicul Chișcăreni (2)	**0–3**	**Petrocub-Hîncești (1)**	Sîngerei
13:00 EEST		Report	Pătraș 52' (pen.); Ambros 79', 90+3'	Stadium: Sîngerei Stadium; Attendance: 200; Referee: Alexandru Tean

25 October 2016	Speranța Nisporeni (1)	**0–1**	**Saxan Ceadîr-Lunga (1)**	Nisporeni
13:00 EEST		Report	Eza 45'	Stadium: Mircea Eliade; Attendance: 400; Referee: Gabriel Tupicico

25 October 2016	**Dinamo-Auto Tiraspol (1)**	**3–2**	Sfîntul Gheorghe (2)	Tîrnauca
13:00 EEST	Diarra 13'; Truhanov 66'; Scripcenco 88'	Report	Luca 18'; Maxim 43'	Stadium: Dinamo-Auto; Attendance: 100; Referee: Gheorghe Malinovschi

25 October 2016	Gagauziya-Oguzsport (2)	**1–8**	**Zaria Bălți (1)**	Comrat
13:00 EEST	Calaraș 22'	Report	Boghiu 11', 40'; Picușceac 48', 54', 78', 90'; Ovseanicov 58', 88'	Stadium: Comrat Stadium; Attendance: 200; Referee: Iurie Covtun

25 October 2016	**Sheriff Tiraspol (1)**	**13–0**	Codru Lozova (2)	Tiraspol
15:00 EEST	Ivančić 2', 21', 44', 45'; Savić 25'; Ivanov 32', 35', 36', 64'; Bayala 39'; Ricardinho 63'; Rebenja 67'; Gînsari 88'	Report		Stadium: The Small Arena; Attendance: 200; Referee: Andrei Ceban

26 October 2016	Sparta Selemet (2)	**1–4**	**Dacia Chișinău (1)**	Speia
13:00 EEST	Cușciac 88'	Report	Yusov 36'; A. Bursuc 45'; Bucătaru 79'; Karaneychev 87'	Stadium: Stadionul Moldova (Speia); Attendance: 100; Referee: Andrei Diordiev

26 October 2016	**Zimbru Chișinău (1)**	**10–0**	Anina Anenii Noi (3)	Chișinău
19:00 EEST	Jean Theodoro 15'; Anton 17', 29'; Neto 27', 52'; Zagaevschi 59'; Stînă 67', 87'; V. Damașcan 84', 90'	Report		Stadium: Zimbru; Attendance: 300; Referee: Ruslan Muntean

== Quarter-finals ==
The 8 winners from the previous round entered the quarter-finals. The home teams were determined in a draw held on 28 October 2016. Matches were played on 26 April 2017. Teams in bold continue to the next round of the competition.

26 April 2017	Milsami Orhei (1)	**0–1**	**Sheriff Tiraspol (1)**	Orhei
15:30 EEST		Report	Gînsari 62'	Stadium: CSR; Attendance: 600; Referee: Veaceslav Banari

26 April 2017	**Petrocub-Hîncești (1)**	**3–0**	Saxan Ceadîr-Lunga (1)	Hîncești
15:30 EEST	Dima 23'; Ursu 82'; Taras 86'	Report		Stadium: Orășenesc; Attendance: 600; Referee: Alexandru Tean

26 April 2017	Dinamo-Auto Tiraspol (1)	**0–4**	**Zimbru Chișinău (1)**	Ghidighici
15:30 EEST		Report	Anton 13', 86'; Milinceanu 28'; Jean Theodoro 58'	Stadium: Ghidighici Stadium; Attendance: 200; Referee: Iurie Rochin

26 April 2017	Dacia Chișinău (1)	**1–1** (a.e.t.) (**2–4** p)	**Zaria Bălți (1)**	Speia
15:30 EEST	Isa 117'	Report	Boghiu 95'	Stadium: Stadionul Moldova (Speia); Attendance: 150; Referee: Dumitru Muntean
	**Penalties**
	Palavandishvili (penalty scored); Bejan (penalty scored); Seoane (penalty missed); Posmac (penalty missed)		(penalty scored) Slinkin; (penalty scored) Boghiu; (penalty scored) Golovatenco; (penalty scored) Yermak

== Semi-finals ==
The 4 winners from the previous round entered the semi-finals. The home teams were determined in a draw held on 28 April 2017. Matches were played on 16 May 2017. Teams in bold continue to the next round of the competition.

16 May 2017	Petrocub-Hîncești (1)	**1–1** (a.e.t.) (**4–5** p)	**Sheriff Tiraspol (1)**	Hîncești
17:00 EEST	Calugher 11'	Report	Savić 39'	Stadium: Stadionul Municipal (Hîncești); Attendance: 500; Referee: Gabriel Tupicico
	**Penalties**
	Pătraș (penalty missed); Ursu (penalty scored); Taras (penalty scored); Calugher (penalty scored); Plămădeală (penalty scored); V. Osipenco (penalty missed)		(penalty scored) Ricardinho; (penalty scored) Gînsari; (penalty missed) Bordian; (penalty scored) V. Damașcan; (penalty scored) Joálisson; (penalty scored) Badibanga

16 May 2017	**Zaria Bălți (1)**	**1–0** (a.e.t.)	Zimbru Chișinău (1)	Bălți
17:00 EEST	Suvorov 115'	Report		Stadium: Orășenesc; Attendance: 5,300; Referee: Alexandru Tean

== Final ==
The final was played on Thursday 25 May 2017 at the Zimbru Stadium in Chișinău. The "home" team (for administrative purposes) was determined by an additional draw held on 17 May 2017.

25 May 2017
20:00 EEST

Sheriff Tiraspol	5–0	Zaria Bălți
Damașcan 48', 59'; Bayala 54', 56'; Jô Santos 89'	Report

Zimbru Stadium, Chișinău
Attendance: 6,900
Referee: Alper Ulusoy (Turkey)

**Sheriff**	**Zaria**

GK	25	(Moldova) Sergiu Juric
DF	14	(Burkina Faso) Benjamin Balima	(substituted off) 52'
DF	21	(Moldova) Maxim Potîrniche
DF	55	(Bosnia and Herzegovina) Mateo Sušić (c)
DF	90	(Serbia) Vujadin Savić
MF	8	(Moldova) Radu Gînsari
MF	20	(Burkina Faso) Cyrille Bayala	(yellow card) 55'	(substituted off) 78'
MF	24	(Ghana) Seidu Yahaya
FW	11	(Brazil) Ricardinho
FW	39	(Belgium) Ziguy Badibanga	(substituted off) 69'
FW	99	(Moldova) Vitalie Damașcan	(substituted off) 60'
Substitutes:
GK	28	(Moldova) Alexei Koșelev
DF	3	(Moldova) Ion Jardan	(substituted on) 52'
DF	6	(Brazil) Victor Oliveira
DF	17	(Moldova) Artiom Rozgoniuc
DF	23	(Slovakia) Dionatan Teixeira	(substituted on) 69'
DF	37	(Moldova) Vitalie Bordian
MF	4	(Sierra Leone) Khalifa Jabbie	(substituted on) 60'
MF	7	(Brazil) Jô Santos	(substituted on) 78'
MF	30	(Croatia) Josip Brezovec
MF	32	(Moldova) Evgheni Oancea
MF	88	(Bosnia and Herzegovina) Zoran Kvržić
Head Coach:
(Italy) Roberto Bordin

GK	33	(Moldova) Serghei Pașcenco
DF	2	(Moldova) Victor Golovatenco	(yellow card) 77'
DF	5	(Moldova) Andrei Novicov
DF	14	(Ukraine) Andriy Slinkin
DF	20	(Ukraine) Oleh Yermak	(substituted off) 51'
MF	4	(Moldova) Alexandru Onica (c)
MF	8	(Moldova) Vadim Rață	(yellow card) 64'
MF	10	(Moldova) Igor Țîgîrlaș
MF	16	(Moldova) Alexandru Suvorov	(substituted off) 65'
MF	19	(Moldova) Maxim Mihaliov	(yellow card) 12'	(substituted off) 79'
FW	9	(Moldova) Gheorghe Ovseanicov
Substitutes:
GK	1	(Moldova) Vladimir Livșiț
DF	6	(Moldova) Iulian Erhan
DF	26	(Bulgaria) Tihomir Trifonov
DF	27	(Moldova) Denis Rassulov
MF	3	(Moldova) Ion Cărăruș
MF	22	(Argentina) Rubén Gómez	(substituted on) 65'	(yellow card) 68'
FW	7	(Mexico) Alberto Alvarado Morín
FW	11	(Moldova) Gheorghe Boghiu	(substituted on) 51'
FW	18	(Moldova) Vadim Gulceac	(substituted on) 79'
FW	21	(Moldova) Igor Bugaiov
Head Coach:
(Moldova) Vlad Goian

Assistant referees:
Serkan Olguncan (Turkey)
Ceyhun Sesigüzel (Turkey)
Fourth official:
Alexandru Tean (Moldova)

**Match rules**

- 90 minutes.
- 30 minutes of extra time if necessary.
- Penalty shoot-out if score is still level.
- Eleven named substitutes, of which up to four may be used.
