= 2016 Moldovan Super Cup =

Supercupa Moldovei
Sheriff Tiraspol	Zaria Bălți
3	1
- Date: 10 August 2016
- Venue: Sheriff Small Arena, Tiraspol
- Referee: Piotr Stoianov
- Attendance: 3,000

The 2016 Moldovan Super Cup was the 10th Moldovan Super Cup (Romanian: Supercupa Moldovei), an annual Moldovan football match played by the winner of the national football league (the National Division) and the winner of the national Cup. The match was played between Sheriff Tiraspol, champions of the 2015–16 National Division, and Zaria Bălți, winners of the 2015–16 Moldovan Cup. It was held at the Sheriff Small Arena on 10 August 2016.

Sheriff Tiraspol won the match 3–1.

== Match ==
10 August 2016
19:00 EEST

Sheriff Tiraspol	3–1	Zaria Bălți
Subotić 18', 82' (pen.); Rebenja 90+1'		Bugaiov 20'

Sheriff Small Arena, Tiraspol
Attendance: 3,000
Referee: Piotr Stoianov

Sheriff	Zaria

GK	28	(Moldova) Alexei Koșelev
DF	15	(Ivory Coast) Marcel Metoua
DF	26	(Croatia) Dino Škvorc
DF	37	(Moldova) Vitalie Bordian		(substituted off) 86'
DF	55	(Bosnia and Herzegovina) Mateo Sušić	(yellow card) 51'
MF	4	(Sierra Leone) Khalifa Jabbie
MF	8	(Moldova) Radu Gînsari
MF	30	(Croatia) Josip Brezovec
FW	11	(Brazil) Ricardinho
FW	31	(Switzerland) Danijel Subotić		(substituted off) 88'
FW	93	(Moldova) Maxim Iurcu		(substituted off) 90+2'
Substitutes:
GK	25	(Moldova) Sergiu Juric
DF	19	(Moldova) Serghei Svinarenco		(substituted on) 86'
DF	22	(Bosnia and Herzegovina) Amer Dupovac
MF	14	(Burkina Faso) Wilfried Balima		(substituted on) 90+2'
MF	32	(Moldova) Evgheni Oancea
MF	88	(Bosnia and Herzegovina) Zoran Kvržić
FW	9	(Croatia) Josip Ivančić
FW	17	(Moldova) Vladislav Ivanov
FW	29	(Moldova) Eugeniu Rebenja		(substituted on) 88'
Manager:
(France) Bruno Irles

GK	33	(Moldova) Serghei Pașcenco
DF	2	(Moldova) Victor Golovatenco	(yellow card) 72'
DF	5	(Moldova) Andrei Novicov
DF	20	(Ukraine) Oleh Yermak
MF	4	(Moldova) Alexandru Onica	(yellow card) 34'	(substituted off) 75'
MF	10	(Moldova) Igor Țîgîrlaș
MF	19	(Moldova) Maxim Mihaliov	(yellow card) 84'	(substituted off) 86'
MF	22	(Argentina) Rubén Gómez
MF	88	(Moldova) Alexandru A. Grosu		(substituted off) 83'
FW	7	(Moldova) Igor Picușceac		(substituted off) 58'
FW	21	(Moldova) Igor Bugaiov	(red card) 71'
Substitutions:
GK	1	(Moldova) Vladimir Livșiț
DF	6	(Moldova) Iulian Erhan
DF	26	(Armenia) Artyom Khachaturov
MF	8	(Moldova) Vadim Rață		(substituted on) 83'
MF	15	(Moldova) Cristian Dros
MF	16	(Moldova) Alexandru Suvorov	(yellow card) 88'	(substituted on) 75'
FW	9	(Moldova) Gheorghe Ovseanicov		(substituted on) 58'
FW	11	(Moldova) Gheorghe Boghiu		(substituted on) 86'
FW	18	(Moldova) Vadim Gulceac
Manager:
(Moldova) Vlad Goian

Assistant referees:
Vitalie Gorbatov
Vlad Lifciu
Additional assistant referees:
Viktor Bugenko
Ruslan Muntean
Fourth official:
Zaharia Cotruță

Match rules

- 90 minutes.
- Penalty shoot-out if score is still level.
- Nine named substitutes, of which up to four may be used.
