= Ivan Urvanțev =

Moldovan footballer

Personal information
- Full name: Ivan Urvanțev
- Date of birth: 2 May 1997 (age 29)
- Place of birth: Tiraspol, Moldova
- Height: 1.70 m (5 ft 7 in)
- Position: Midfielder

Team information
- Current team: Bălți
- Number: 8

Youth career
- –2015: Sheriff Tiraspol

Senior career*
Years	Team	Apps	(Gls)
2016–2019	Sheriff Tiraspol	25	(0)
2017	→ Petrocub Hîncești (loan)	10	(0)
2018	→ Zaria Bălți (loan)	7	(0)
2018	→ Sfântul Gheorghe (loan)	5	(0)
2019–2020	Dinamo-Auto	19	(3)
2020	Ripensia Timișoara	12	(0)
2021	Whitchurch Alport		
2022	Nantwich Town	15	(1)
2023-2024	Minaur Baia Mare	32	(0)
2024-	Bălți	45	(3)

International career^{‡}
2015	Moldova U18	5	(0)
2014–2015	Moldova U19	7	(0)
2017	Moldova U21	1	(0)
- * Club domestic league appearances and goals as of 1 June 2026 ‡ National team caps and goals as of 23 March 2017

Ivan Urvanțev (born 2 May 1997) is a Moldovan professional footballer, currently playing as a midfielder for Moldovan Liga club Bălți.

== Honours ==
FC Sheriff Tiraspol

- Divizia Națională: 2015–16, 2016–17
- Moldovan Cup: 2015–16
- Divizia "A": 2014–15
- Moldovan Super Cup: 2016
