= Mateo Sušić =

Bosnian footballer (born 1990)

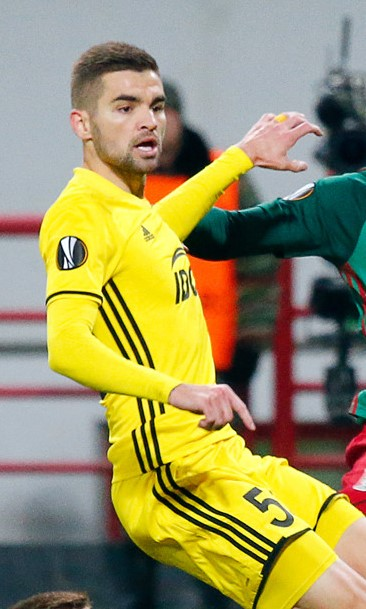
- Sušić playing for Sheriff Tiraspol in 2017

Personal information
- Date of birth: 18 November 1990 (age 35)
- Place of birth: Mostar, SR Bosnia and Herzegovina, SFR Yugoslavia
- Height: 1.81 m (5 ft 11 in)
- Position: Right-back

Youth career
- NK Međugorje
- 2002–2007: Brotnjo
- 2007–2008: Zrinjski Mostar

Senior career*
| Years | Team | Apps | (Gls) |
| 2008–2010 | Zrinjski Mostar | 39 | (0) |
| 2010–2013 | Istra 1961 | 72 | (4) |
| 2013–2014 | Energie Cottbus | 5 | (0) |
| 2014–2015 | CFR Cluj | 16 | (0) |
| 2015–2019 | Sheriff Tiraspol | 106 | (4) |
| 2019–2022 | CFR Cluj | 62 | (2) |
| 2022–2025 | APOEL | 80 | (3) |
| 2025–2026 | Zrinjski Mostar | 9 | (0) |
| Total | | 389 | (13) |

International career
| 2008 | Bosnia and Herzegovina U19 | 2 | (0) |
| 2009–2012 | Bosnia and Herzegovina U21 | 7 | (0) |
| 2016–2022 | Bosnia and Herzegovina | 11 | (0) |
- * Club domestic league appearances and goals

Mateo Sušić (pronounced [mǎteo sǔʃitɕ]; born 18 November 1990) is a Bosnian former professional footballer who played as a right-back.

Sušić started his professional career at Zrinjski Mostar, before joining Istra 1961 in 2010. Three years later, he moved to Energie Cottbus. In 2014, he signed with CFR Cluj. The following year, he was transferred to Sheriff Tiraspol. Sušić came back to CFR Cluj in 2019. In 2022, he joined APOEL. Three years later, he returned to Zrinjski Mostar.

A former youth international for Bosnia and Herzegovina, Sušić made his senior international debut in 2016, earning 11 caps until 2022.

== Club career ==
=== Early career ===
Sušić started playing football at local clubs, before joining the youth academy of his hometown team Zrinjski Mostar in 2007. He made his professional debut in a UEFA Europa League qualifier against Vaduz on 31 July 2008 at the age of 17.

In the summer of 2010, Sušić switched to Croatian side Istra 1961. On 30 October, he scored his first professional goal against Karlovac, which secured the victory for his squad.

In June 2013, he moved to German outfit Energie Cottbus.

In June 2014, he signed with Romanian club CFR Cluj.

=== Sheriff Tiraspol ===
In January 2015, Sušić was transferred to Moldovan side Sheriff Tiraspol for an undisclosed fee. He made his official debut for the team against Bălți on 28 February. On 18 October, he scored his first goal for Sheriff Tiraspol in a triumph over Petrocub.

Sušić was named squad captain in March 2016.

He won his first trophy with the club on 30 May, when they were crowned league champions.

In February 2017, he extended his contract with Sheriff Tiraspol until June 2020.

He played his 100th game for the team against Speranța on 7 April 2018.

=== Return to CFR Cluj ===
In June 2019, Sušić returned to CFR Cluj on a three-year contract. He played his first competitive game for the side since coming back in a UEFA Champions League qualifier against Astana on 9 July. A week later, he appeared in his first league game after returning against Politehnica Iași. On 21 December, he scored his first goal for CFR Cluj in a defeat of Voluntari. He won his first title with the club on 3 August 2020, when they secured league title.

=== APOEL ===
In June 2022, Sušić signed a two-year deal with Cypriot outfit APOEL. On 28 August, he debuted officially for the team against Pafos and managed to score a goal. He won his first piece of silverware for the club on 11 May 2024, when they were proclaimed league winners.

In May, he signed a new one-year contract with APOEL.

He made his 100th appearance for the squad on 15 March 2025 against Aris Limassol.

=== Later stage of career ===
In June, Sušić came back to Zrinjski Mostar.

He announced his retirement from football on 17 June 2026.

== International career ==
Sušić represented Bosnia and Herzegovina at various youth levels.

In March 2016, he received his first senior call up, for friendly games against Luxembourg and Switzerland. He debuted against the former on 25 March.

== Personal life ==
Sušić married his long-time girlfriend Ana in May 2014. Together they have two children, a daughter named Rita and a son named Noa.

== Career statistics ==
=== Club ===
Appearances and goals by club, season and competition
| Club | Season | League | | | National cup (Note: Includes Bosnian Cup, Croatian Cup, Cupa României, Cupa Moldovei, Cypriot Cup) | | Continental | | Other | | Total | |
| Club | Season | Division | Apps | Goals | Apps | Goals | Apps | Goals | Apps | Goals | Apps | Goals |
|---|---|---|---|---|---|---|---|---|---|---|---|---|
| Zrinjski Mostar | 2008–09 | Bosnian Premier League | 14 | 0 | 6 | 0 | 2 (Note: Appearances in UEFA Cup) | 0 | – | | 22 | 0 |
| Zrinjski Mostar | 2009–10 | Bosnian Premier League | 25 | 0 | 7 | 0 | 2 (Note: Appearances in UEFA Champions League) | 0 | – | | 34 | 0 |
| Zrinjski Mostar | Total | | 39 | 0 | 13 | 0 | 4 | 0 | – | | 56 | 0 |
| Istra 1961 | 2010–11 | Croatian Football League | 19 | 2 | 3 | 0 | – | | – | | 22 | 2 |
| Istra 1961 | 2011–12 | Croatian Football League | 26 | 2 | 4 | 0 | – | | – | | 30 | 2 |
| Istra 1961 | 2012–13 | Croatian Football League | 27 | 0 | 2 | 0 | – | | – | | 29 | 0 |
| Istra 1961 | Total | | 72 | 4 | 9 | 0 | – | | – | | 81 | 4 |
| Energie Cottbus | 2013–14 | 2. Bundesliga | 5 | 0 | 0 | 0 | – | | – | | 5 | 0 |
| CFR Cluj | 2014–15 | Liga I | 16 | 0 | 2 | 0 | 4 (Note: Appearances in UEFA Europa League) | 0 | – | | 22 | 0 |
| Sheriff Tiraspol | 2014–15 | Moldovan Super Liga | 11 | 0 | 2 | 0 | – | | – | | 13 | 0 |
| Sheriff Tiraspol | 2015–16 | Moldovan Super Liga | 25 | 1 | 2 | 0 | 2 | 0 | 1 (Note: Appearance in Supercupa Moldovei) | 0 | 30 | 1 |
| Sheriff Tiraspol | 2016–17 | Moldovan Super Liga | 21 | 1 | 3 | 0 | 2 | 0 | 1 | 0 | 27 | 1 |
| Sheriff Tiraspol | 2017 | Moldovan Super Liga | 16 | 0 | 0 | 0 | 12 (Note: Four appearances in UEFA Champions League; eight appearances in UEFA Europa League) | 0 | – | | 28 | 0 |
| Sheriff Tiraspol | 2018 | Moldovan Super Liga | 23 | 2 | 2 | 0 | 8 (Note: Four appearances in UEFA Champions League; four appearances in UEFA Europa League) | 0 | – | | 33 | 2 |
| Sheriff Tiraspol | 2019 | Moldovan Super Liga | 10 | 0 | 3 | 0 | 0 | 0 | 0 | 0 | 13 | 0 |
| Sheriff Tiraspol | Total | | 106 | 4 | 12 | 0 | 24 | 0 | 2 | 0 | 144 | 4 |
| CFR Cluj | 2019–20 | Liga I | 16 | 2 | 1 | 0 | 12 (Note: Eight appearances in UEFA Champions League; four appearances in UEFA Europa League) | 0 | 0 | 0 | 29 | 2 |
| CFR Cluj | 2020–21 | Liga I | 26 | 0 | 1 | 0 | 10 (Note: Two appearances in UEFA Champions League; eight appearances in UEFA Europa League) | 0 | 0 | 0 | 37 | 0 |
| CFR Cluj | 2021–22 | Liga I | 20 | 0 | 0 | 0 | 7 (Note: Five appearances in UEFA Champions League; two appearances in UEFA Conference League) | 0 | 0 | 0 | 27 | 0 |
| CFR Cluj | Total | | 62 | 2 | 2 | 0 | 29 | 0 | 0 | 0 | 93 | 2 |
| APOEL | 2022–23 | Cypriot First Division | 25 | 3 | 3 | 0 | 0 | 0 | – | | 28 | 3 |
| APOEL | 2023–24 | Cypriot First Division | 32 | 0 | 0 | 0 | 6 (Note: Appearances in UEFA Conference League) | 0 | – | | 38 | 0 |
| APOEL | 2024–25 | Cypriot First Division | 23 | 0 | 2 | 0 | 13 (Note: Four appearances in UEFA Champions League; two appearances, one goal in UEFA Europa League; seven appearances in UEFA Conference League) | 1 | 1 (Note: Appearance in Cypriot Super Cup) | 0 | 39 | 1 |
| APOEL | Total | | 80 | 3 | 5 | 0 | 19 | 1 | 1 | 0 | 105 | 4 |
| Zrinjski Mostar | 2025–26 | Bosnian Premier League | 9 | 0 | 2 | 0 | 5 (Note: Four appearances in UEFA Champions League; one appearance in UEFA Europa League) | 0 | 0 | 0 | 16 | 0 |
| Career total | | | 389 | 13 | 45 | 0 | 85 | 1 | 3 | 0 | 522 | 14 |

=== International ===
Appearances and goals by national team and year
| National team | Year | Apps | Goals |
|---|---|---|---|
Bosnia and Herzegovina
| Bosnia and Herzegovina | 2016 | 4 | 0 |
| Bosnia and Herzegovina | 2017 | 1 | 0 |
| Bosnia and Herzegovina | 2018 | 0 | 0 |
| Bosnia and Herzegovina | 2019 | 0 | 0 |
| Bosnia and Herzegovina | 2020 | 0 | 0 |
| Bosnia and Herzegovina | 2021 | 3 | 0 |
| Bosnia and Herzegovina | 2022 | 3 | 0 |
| Total | | 11 | 0 |

== Honours ==
Zrinjski Mostar

- Bosnian Premier League: 2008–09
- Bosnian Cup: 2025–26
- Bosnian Supercup: 2025

Sheriff Tiraspol

- Moldovan Super Liga: 2015–16, 2016–17, 2017, 2018
- Cupa Moldovei: 2014–15, 2016–17, 2018–19
- Supercupa Moldovei: 2015, 2016

CFR Cluj

- Liga I: 2019–20, 2020–21, 2021–22
- Supercupa României: 2020

APOEL

- Cypriot First Division: 2023–24
- Cypriot Super Cup: 2024
