= Serghei Svinarenco =

Moldovan footballer

Personal information
- Full name: Serghei Svinarenco
- Date of birth: 18 September 1996 (age 30)
- Place of birth: Tiraspol, Moldova
- Height: 1.72 m (5 ft 7 1/2 in)
- Position: Left-back

Team information
- Current team: FC Milsami Orhei
- Number: 6

Youth career
- Sheriff Tiraspol

Senior career*
| Years | Team | Apps | (Gls) |
| 2015–2023 | Sheriff Tiraspol | 21 | (1) |
| 2017 | → Petrocub Hîncești (loan) | 6 | (0) |
| 2018 | → Zaria Bălți (loan) | 3 | (0) |
| 2018–2023 | → Sfântul Gheorghe (loan) | 83 | (1) |
| 2023– | FC Milsami Orhei | 4 | (0) |

International career
| 2012 | Moldova U17 | 3 | (0) |
| 2014 | Moldova U19 | 4 | (0) |
| 2015–2018 | Moldova U21 | 15 | (2) |
- * Club domestic league appearances and goals as of 5 August 2023

Serghei Svinarenco (born 18 September 1996) is a Moldovan footballer who plays as a defender for Moldovan Super Liga club FC Milsami Orhei.

== Honours ==
Sheriff Tiraspol

- Moldovan National Division: 2015–16, 2016–17
- Moldovan Cup: 2014–15, 2016–17
- Moldovan Super Cup: 2015, 2016
