= Maxim Potîrniche =

Moldovan footballer

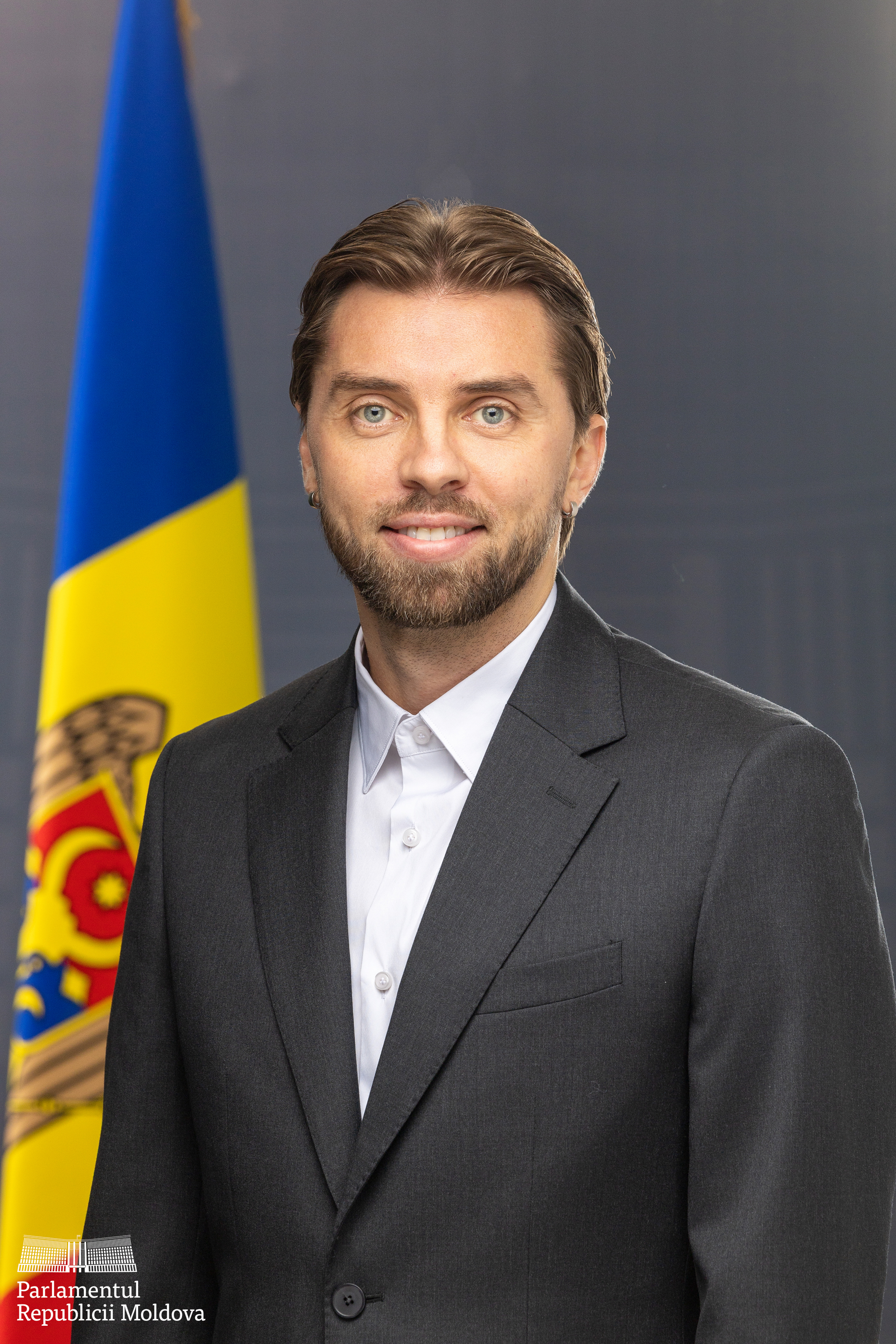
- Official portrait, 2025

Personal information
- Date of birth: 13 June 1989 (age 37)
- Place of birth: Chișinău, Moldavian SSR, Soviet Union
- Height: 1.85 m (6 ft 1 in)
- Position: Defender

Senior career*
Years	Team	Apps	(Gls)
2008–2012	Academia UTM Chișinău	103	(4)
2012	Iskra-Stal Rîbnița	12	(0)
2013	Belshina Bobruisk	23	(1)
2014	Energetyk ROW Rybnik	3	(0)
2014	Zimbru Chișinău	12	(0)
2015–2017	Sheriff Tiraspol	34	(0)
2017–2025	Petrocub Hîncești	156	(7)

International career^{‡}
2011–2022	Moldova	14	(0)
Political career
Member of the Moldovan Parliament
Incumbent
Assumed office 22 October 2025
Parliamentary group	Party of Action and Solidarity
- * Club domestic league appearances and goals as of 5 January 2025 ‡ National team caps and goals as of 23 August 2024

Maxim Potîrniche (born 13 June 1989) is a Moldovan politician and former footballer who played as a defender.

== Club career ==
=== FC Academia ===
In 2008 Maxim Potîrniche signed for his home town club, Moldovan outfit FC Academia, where he made 23 appearances in his first season.

== International career ==
On 10 August 2011 Potîrniche made his debut for the Moldova national football team in a friendly match against Cyprus.

== Politics ==
Potîrniche entered the 2025 Moldovan parliamentary election as a candidate for the Party of Action and Solidarity (PAS), being placed 27th on the party list. The PAS won the election with 55 seats, thus securing Potîrniche's place in the parliament.

== Personal life ==
Maxim Potîrniche declares himself Romanian and supports the reunification of Moldova and Romania.

== Honours ==
Sheriff Tiraspol

- Moldovan Super Liga: 2015–16, 2016–17
- Moldovan Cup: 2014–15, 2016–17
- Moldovan Super Cup: 2015

Petrocub Hîncești

- Moldovan Super Liga: 2023–24
- Moldovan Cup: 2019, 2023–24
