= Dino Škvorc =

Croatian footballer (born 1990)

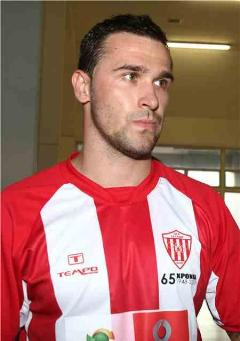
- Škvorc with Nea Salamis in 2013

Personal information
- Date of birth: 2 February 1990 (age 36)
- Place of birth: Čakovec, SFR Yugoslavia
- Height: 1.85 m (6 ft 1 in)
- Position: Defender

Team information
- Current team: GKS Tychy (assistant)

Youth career
- Čakovec
- 2003–2009: Varaždin

Senior career*
Years	Team	Apps	(Gls)
2007–2011	Varteks / Varaždin	58	(2)
2011	Dinamo Zagreb	0	(0)
2011	→ Lokomotiva (loan)	8	(0)
2012	KV Mechelen	0	(0)
2012–2013	Beitar Jerusalem	32	(1)
2013–2014	Nea Salamis	32	(0)
2014–2015	Universitatea Cluj	26	(0)
2015–2016	Hapoel Kfar Saba	29	(0)
2016–2017	Sheriff Tiraspol	16	(1)
2017	RNK Split	5	(0)
2017	Ankaran Hrvatini	5	(0)
2018	Alashkert	11	(0)
2018–2019	Budapest Honvéd	12	(0)
2020	Rudar Velenje	0	(0)
2020–2021	Polet Sv. Martin na Muri		
2021–2023	DSV Leoben	29	(2)

International career
2005	Croatia U15	2	(0)
2005–2006	Croatia U16	10	(1)
2006	Croatia U17	4	(0)
2008	Croatia U18	3	(1)
2008	Croatia U19	7	(2)
2010	Croatia U20	1	(0)
2010–2011	Croatia U21	4	(0)

Managerial career
- 2022–2024: DSV Leoben (assistant)
- 2024: PAS Giannina (assistant)
- 2024–2025: Grazer AK (assistant)
- 2026–: GKS Tychy (assistant)
- * Club domestic league appearances and goals

Dino Škvorc (born 2 February 1990) is a Croatian football coach and former player who played as a centre-back. He is currently the assistant first-team coach at Polish club GKS Tychy.

== Career ==
While still part of the NK Varteks youth system, Škvorc made his professional debut with the senior Varteks in the 2007–08 Prva HNL, in the away game against NK Osijek on 27 October 2007. He established himself as a starting eleven regular in the 2009–10 Prva HNL season, in which he appeared in 27 out of 30 league matches for the club.

In June 2010, after losing its main sponsorship deal (with Varteks clothing factory), Varteks changed its name to NK Varaždin, and immediately started suffering financial difficulties, leading to its players not consistently receiving their salaries. In June 2011, the Croatian Football Federation terminated Varaždin's contract with Škvorc, allowing him to sign a five-year contract with Dinamo Zagreb. In August 2011, he was loaned to NK Lokomotiva. In January 2012, Škvorc terminated his contract with Dinamo. In February 2012, Škvorc signed a sixth-month contract with Belgian club KV Mechelen with a possibility of a two-year extension.

Škvorc left Sheriff Tiraspol in January 2017. In February 2017, he signed for RNK Split. Later he played for Polet Sv. Martin na Muri.

== Honours ==
Sheriff Tiraspol

- Moldovan National Division: 2016–17
- Moldovan Super Cup: 2016
