= Danijel Subotić =

Swiss footballer (born 1989)

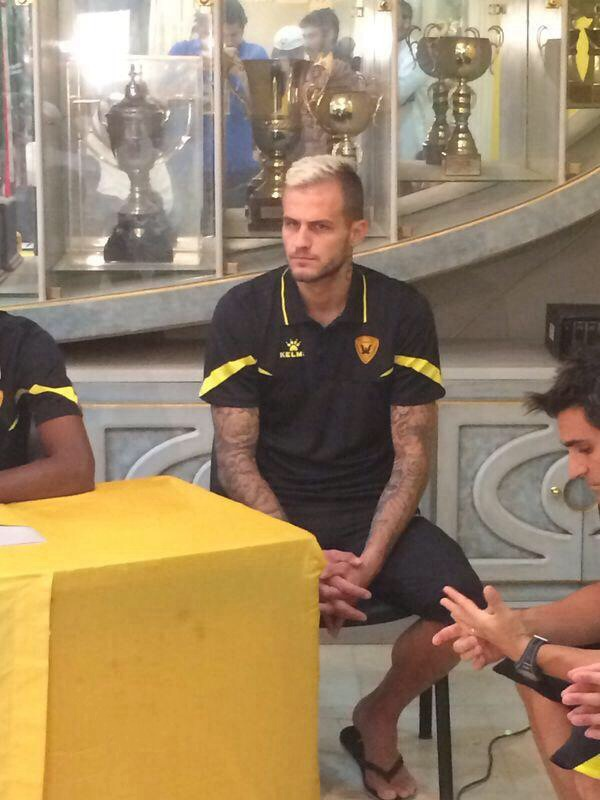
- Danjiel Subotic in Qadsia SC 2014

Personal information
- Date of birth: 31 January 1989 (age 37)
- Place of birth: Zagreb, SR Croatia, SFR Yugoslavia
- Height: 1.81 m (5 ft 11 in)
- Position: Forward

Team information
- Current team: FC Glattbrugg
- Number: 31

Youth career
- –2008: FC Basel

Senior career*
Years	Team	Apps	(Gls)
2008–2010	Portsmouth	0	(0)
2008–2009	→ Zulte Waregem (loan)	13	(1)
2010	Grosseto	4	(0)
2011	FCU Craiova	15	(5)
2011–2012	Târgu Mureș	14	(2)
2012–2013	Volyn Lutsk	23	(4)
2013–2014	Gabala	29	(12)
2014–2015	Qadsia	28	(12)
2015–2017	Sheriff Tiraspol	35	(15)
2017	Gabala	11	(3)
2017	Ulsan	11	(1)
2018	Shakhter Karagandy	9	(0)
2018	Dinamo București	5	(1)
2019–2020	Grasshopper	16	(5)
2022–2023	Rapperswil-Jona	2	(0)
2023–	FC Glattbrugg	13	(5)

International career
2005–2006	Switzerland U-16	5	(1)
2006–2007	Switzerland U-17	4	(0)
2007–2008	Switzerland U-19	6	(0)
- * Club domestic league appearances and goals as of 21:16, 27 November 2023 (UTC)

Danijel Subotić (born 31 January 1989) is a Swiss professional footballer who plays as striker for FC Glattbrugg. He was Swiss youth international footballer at various levels.

== Personal life ==
Subotić was born in Zagreb, SR Croatia, but his family originated from Doboj, Bosnia and Herzegovina, all back then part of Yugoslavia. His younger brother Dejan (born in 1996) is also footballer, having signed his first professional contract in 2018 with Serbian club FK Rad.

== Club career ==
=== Youth football ===
Subotić began his youth football in his adoptive country Switzerland. He played in the youth department of FC Basel, in their U-18 team during the 2005–06 season, under coach Patrick Rahmen and his assistant Marco Walker and with them, won both the Swiss U-18 championship and the U-19/18 national cup that season. The following season he advanced to their U-21 team, who played in the third tier, and they won their division (group B) and became Swiss champions at U-21 level. He started the 2007–08 season them too, played in nine of the 17 fixtures, but left the club in January. The team went on to win the division (group 2) and become Swiss champions at U-21 level again.

=== Portsmouth ===
On 7 January 2008, he became English Premier League side Portsmouth F.C.'s first signing in the 2008 January transfer window. He signed a reported 3 1/2-year contract.

On 5 August 2008, Subotić moved on loan to Belgian club Zulte Waregem, the Portsmouth's feeder club at that time (which relationship ended in June 2009) along with Andréa Mbuyi-Mutombo in order to gain first-team experience. He scored 1 goal in 13 league appearances before returned to England in January 2009.

On 7 August 2010, Italian Serie B side Grosseto announced Subotić was trying out at the club. Nearly 2 weeks later, Pompey formally announced Subotić's contract was canceled by mutual consent.

=== Universitatea Craiova ===
In February 2011, Danijel Subotić signed a contract with the Romanian club FC Universitatea Craiova of Liga 1. On 20 March 2011, he scored his first goal for FC Universitatea Craiova during the match against FC Astra Ploieşti.

In July 2011, Subotić went on trial with Scottish Premier League side St Johnstone, where he played in one friendly match in an attempt to win a contract.

=== Gabala ===
On 1 July 2013, Subotić signed a one-year contract with Azerbaijan Premier League side Gabala. However Subotić could not feature in any of Gabala's opening five matches as there was a dispute over the players registration between Volyn Lutsk and Gabala, which was finally sorted out during the September International break. Subotić made his debut and scored his first goal for Gabala on 15 September 2013 in a 2–1 away victory over AZAL. On 19 February 2014, Subotić scored his tenth goal for Gabala in only his sixteenth game.

=== Qadsia SC ===
Rejecting a new contract with Gabala, Subotić signed instead for Kuwaiti team Qadsia in July 2014. He won 3 titles and scored 31 goals in 28 matches but left the club at the end of the season.

=== Sheriff Tiraspol ===
On 23 July 2015, Subotić signed for Moldovan side Sheriff Tiraspol, leaving the club by mutual consent on 28 January 2017.

=== Gabala Return ===
On 31 January 2017, Gabala announced the signing of Subotić on a six-month contract. Subotić left Gabala at the end of his contract.

=== Ulsan Hyundai ===
On 11 July 2017, Subotić signed a one-year contract with Ulsan Hyundai.

=== Shakhter Karagandy ===
On 28 March 2018, Shakhter Karagandy announced the signing of Subotić.

=== Dinamo București ===
On 11 September 2018, Dinamo București announced the signing of Subotić.

=== Rapperswil-Jona ===
After not playing for two seasons, on 28 July 2022 Subotić signed with Rapperswil-Jona in the third-tier Swiss Promotion League.

=== FC Glattbrugg ===
In September 2023, Subotić joined Swiss amateur club FC Glattbrugg.

== International career ==
Subotić has dual citizenship, Swiss as well as Bosnian. However his Croatian background also helped him eligible to play for all three.

During his time with FC Basel he was called up to represent Switzerland at various youth levels. Together with his Basel team-mates Oliver Klaus, Fabian Frei, Valentin Stocker, Dominik Ritter, Michel Morganella and Pascal Schürpf, Subotić played in the Switzerland U-19 team during the 2008 UEFA European Under-19 Football Championship qualification.

== Career statistics ==
As of match played 14 February 2020

Appearances and goals by club, season and competition
Club	Season	League			National cup		League cup		Continental		Other		Total	
Club	Season	Division	Apps	Goals	Apps	Goals	Apps	Goals	Apps	Goals	Apps	Goals	Apps	Goals
Portsmouth	2008–09	Premier League	0	0	0	0	0	0	–		–		0	0
Portsmouth	2009–10	Premier League	0	0	0	0	0	0	–		–		0	0
Portsmouth	Total		0	0	0	0	0	0	0	0	0	0	0	0
Zulte Waregem (loan)	2009–10	Jupiler Pro League	13	1	0	0	–		–		–		13	1
Grosseto	2010–11	Serie B	4	0	0	0	–		–		–		4	0
Universitatea Craiova	2010–11	Liga I	16	5	0	0	–		–		–		16	5
Târgu Mureș	2011–12	Liga I	15	2	2	1	–		–		–		17	3
Volyn Lutsk	2012–13	Ukrainian Premier League	23	4	2	1	–		–		–		25	5
Gabala	2013–14	Azerbaijan Premier League	29	12	6	1	–		–		–		35	13
Qadsia	2014–15	Kuwait Premier League							12	3	–			
Sheriff Tiraspol	2015–16	Divizia Națională	26	12	2	0	–		0	0	0	0	28	12
Sheriff Tiraspol	2016–17	Divizia Națională	9	3	0	0	–		2	0	1	2	12	5
Sheriff Tiraspol	Total		35	15	2	0	0	0	2	0	1	2	40	17
Gabala	2016–17	Azerbaijan Premier League	11	3	2	3	–		0	0	–		13	6
Ulsan Hyundai	2017	K League 1	11	1	1	1	–		–		–		12	2
Shakhter Karagandy	2018	Kazakhstan Premier League	9	0	4	0	–		–		–		13	0
Dinamo București	2018–19	Liga I	5	1	1	0	–		–		–		6	1
Grasshopper	2019–20	Swiss Challenge League	16	5	2	0	–		–		–		18	5
Career total			187	49	22	7	0	0	14	3	1	2	224	61

== Honours ==
FC Basel

- Swiss champion at U-18 level: 2005–06
- Swiss Cup at U-19/U-18 level: 2005–06
- Swiss champion at U-21 level: 2006–07

Qadsia SC

- Kuwait Emir Cup: 2014–15
- Kuwait Super Cup: 2014
- AFC Cup: 2014

Sheriff Tiraspol

- Moldovan National Division: 2015–16
- Moldovan Super Cup: 2016

Individual

- Moldovan National Division Top scorer (1): 2015–16 (12 goals)

== Sources ==
- Josef Zindel (2018). FC Basel 1893. Die ersten 125 Jahre (in German). Basel: Friedrich Reinhardt Verlag. ISBN 978-3-7245-2305-5.
