= Sven Jajcinovic =

Croatian footballer

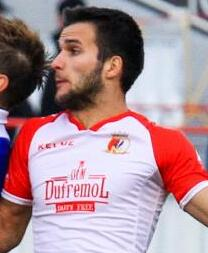
- Jajcinovic in 2016

Personal information
- Date of birth: 4 April 1993 (age 33)
- Place of birth: Sisak, Croatia
- Height: 1.70 m (5 ft 7 in)
- Position: Midfielder

Youth career
- Segesta
- Hrvatski Dragovoljac

Senior career*
Years	Team	Apps	(Gls)
2011–2016	Hrvatski Dragovoljac	105	(10)
2016–2017	Milsami Orhei	24	(0)
2017–2018	Hrvatski Dragovoljac	26	(2)
2018–2019	Kavala	0	(0)
- * Club domestic league appearances and goals as of 24 August 2022

Sven Jajcinovic (born 4 April 1993) is a Croatian footballer who plays as a midfielder.
