= Josip Brezovec =

Croatian professional footballer

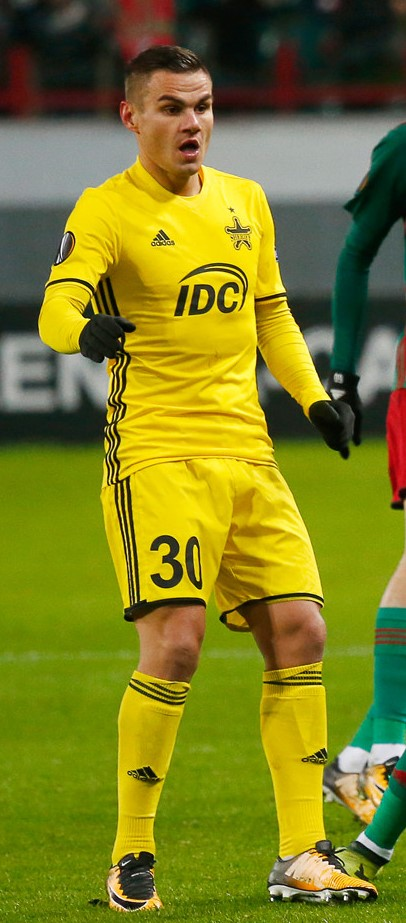

Personal information
- Date of birth: 12 March 1986 (age 40)
- Place of birth: Varaždin, SR Croatia, SFR Yugoslavia
- Height: 1.75 m (5 ft 9 in)
- Position: Defensive midfielder

Team information
- Current team: NK Polet
- Number: 21

Youth career
- 1994–1996: NK Nedeljanec
- 1996–2004: Varteks

Senior career*
Years	Team	Apps	(Gls)
2005	NK Nedeljanec		
2005–2006	SV St. Michael		
2006	Belišće	14	(1)
2007–2010	Varteks	97	(10)
2010–2011	Dinamo Zagreb	6	(0)
2011–2012	Slaven Belupo	26	(5)
2012–2016	Rijeka	73	(4)
2014–2015	→ Spezia (loan)	51	(7)
2016–2018	Sheriff Tiraspol	37	(17)
2018	Slaven Belupo	8	(0)
2018	Varaždin	7	(1)
2018–2019	Inter Zaprešić	17	(0)
2019–	NK Polet	0	(0)

International career
2005–2008	Croatia U21	5	(2)
- * Club domestic league appearances and goals as of 19 May 2018

Josip "Beli" Brezovec (born 12 March 1986) is a Croatian professional footballer who plays as a defensive midfielder for NK Polet.

== Club career ==
Brezovac was born Varaždin. His home club was NK Nedeljanec but as a 10-year-old, he joined NK Varteks and played there until leaving the junior experience in winter 2004–05.

As a junior, he did not manage to enter into the first team at Varteks, so he returned to his home club Nedeljanec. Then he went to the Austrian Regionalliga (Club St. Michael). After a short time in Austria, he returned in Croatia in the summer of 2006. He signed a contract with the Croatian second division club NK Belišće.

In November 2010, it was announced that Brezovec agreed on terms with Dinamo Zagreb and will be transferred out of NK Varaždin (new name of the Varteks) in the mid-season for an undisclosed fee. He signed a four-and-a-half-year contract. However, after playing only nine games for Dinamo by the end of season, Brezovec was signed by Slaven Belupo. In June 2012, Brezovec was signed by HNK Rijeka. With ten assists to his account, he was the league leader in the 2012–13 season. In September 2014, Brezovec was loaned to Spezia Calcio in Italy's Serie B. In January 2016, he returned to Rijeka, where he played for the remainder of the 2015–16 season. On 2 July 2016, it was announced that Brezovec was signed by FC Sheriff Tiraspol for a fee of €250,000.

On 19 November 2018, Brezovec joined Croatian First Football League side Inter Zaprešić.

On 23 June 2019, Brezovec joined Croatian Third Football League side NK Polet.

== Career statistics ==
As of match played 27 May 2019

Club	Season	League	League		Cup & Supercup		Europe		Total	
Club	Season	League	Apps	Goals	Apps	Goals	Apps	Goals	Apps	Goals
Belišće	2006–07	2. HNL	14	1	2	3	–		16	4
Varteks	2006–07	1. HNL	8	0	–		–		8	0
Varteks	2007–08	1. HNL	26	2	4	0	–		30	2
Varteks	2008–09	1. HNL	29	4	2	0	–		31	4
Varteks	2009–10	1. HNL	18	0	3	1	–		21	1
Varteks	2010–11	1. HNL	16	4	3	2	–		19	6
Varteks	Total		97	10	12	3	0	0	109	13
Dinamo Zagreb	2010–11	1. HNL	6	0	3	0	–		9	0
Slaven Belupo	2011–12	1. HNL	26	5	2	0	–		28	5
Rijeka	2012–13	1. HNL	30	2	1	0	–		31	2
Rijeka	2013–14	1. HNL	25	1	7	1	6	0	38	2
Rijeka	2014–15	1. HNL	6	0	1	0	5	0	12	0
Rijeka	2015–16	1. HNL	11	1	1	0	–		12	1
Rijeka	Total		73	4	10	1	11	0	94	5
Spezia (loan)	2014–15	Serie B	34	5	–		–		34	5
Spezia (loan)	2015–16	Serie B	17	2	4	0	–		21	2
Spezia (loan)	Total		51	7	4	0	0	0	55	7
Sheriff Tiraspol	2016–17	Nat. Div.	28	12	3	0	2	1	33	13
Sheriff Tiraspol	2017	Nat. Div.	9	5	–		12	1	21	6
Sheriff Tiraspol	Total		37	17	3	0	14	2	54	19
Slaven Belupo	2017–18	1. HNL	8	0	–		–		8	0
Varaždin	2018–19	2. HNL	7	1	1	1	–		8	2
Inter Zaprešić	2018–19	1. HNL	17	0	2	1	–		19	1
Career total			336	45	39	9	25	2	400	56

== Honours ==
Dinamo Zagreb

- Prva HNL: 2010–11
- Croatian Cup: 2011

Rijeka

- Prva HNL runner-up (4): 2012–13, 2013–14, 2014–15, 2015–16
- Croatian Cup: 2014
- Croatian Super Cup: 2014

Sheriff Tiraspol

- Moldovan National Division: 2016–17
- Moldovan Cup: 2017
- Moldovan Super Cup: 2016, 2017
