= Cristin Jalbă =

Moldovan footballer

Personal information
- Date of birth: 2 September 1997 (age 29)
- Place of birth: Călărași, Moldova
- Height: 1.75 m (5 ft 9 in)
- Position: Defender

Youth career
- –2014: Speranța Nisporeni

Senior career*
Years	Team	Apps	(Gls)
2015	Speranța Nisporeni	4	(0)
2016–2017	Academia Chișinău	14	(3)
2017	Dacia Chișinău	25	(0)
2018	Dinamo-Auto	13	(1)
2019	Codru Lozova	7	(0)
2019–2020	Ceahlăul Piatra Neamț	15	(2)
2020–2021	SCM Zalău	15	(1)
2021–2022	Ceahlăul Piatra Neamț	20	(4)
2022–2023	SCM Zalău	24	(2)
2023–2024	Ceahlăul Piatra Neamț	21	(2)
2024–2025	CSM Focșani	14	(0)
2025	Unirea Ungheni	9	(0)

International career
2015–2016	Moldova U19	2	(0)
2017	Moldova U21	9	(0)
- * Club domestic league appearances and goals as of 10 May 2025

Cristin Jalbă (born 2 September 1997) is a Moldovan professional footballer who plays as a defender.
