= Veaceslav Zagaevschi =

Moldovan footballer

Personal information
- Full name: Veaceslav Zagaevschi
- Date of birth: 4 April 1996 (age 30)
- Place of birth: Soroca, Moldova
- Height: 1.81 m (5 ft 11 1/2 in)
- Position: Midfielder

Youth career
- Zimbru Chișinău

Senior career*
Years	Team	Apps	(Gls)
2013–2017	Zimbru-2 Chișinău	40	(9)
2015–2018	Zimbru Chișinău	41	(2)
2018–2020	Milsami Orhei	32	(3)
2021–	TuS Makkabi	0	(0)

International career^{‡}
2016–2018	Moldova U21 (Note: Only official UEFA matches included)	1	(0)
- * Club domestic league appearances and goals as of 13 July 2020 ‡ National team caps and goals as of 27 March 2018

Veaceslav Zagaevschi (born 4 April 1996) is a Moldovan professional footballer who plays as a midfielder.

== Football career ==
Zagaevschi made his professional debut for Zimbru in the Divizia Națională on 6 May 2016 against Zaria Bălți, coming on as a 38th-minute substitute.
