= 2016–17 Moldovan National Division =

Moldovan National Division
- Season: 2016–17
- Matches: 165
- Goals: 422 (2.56 per match)
- Top goalscorer: Ricardinho (15 goals)
- Biggest home win: Sheriff 7–0 Ungheni (6 August 2016)
- Biggest away win: Academia 0–4 Milsami (20 August 2016)
- Highest scoring: Sheriff 7–0 Ungheni (6 August 2016)
- Longest winning run: Sheriff; Zimbru (4 games)
- Longest unbeaten run: Sheriff; Zimbru; Petrocub; Zaria (4 games)
- Longest winless run: Academia (4 games)
- Longest losing run: Ungheni (5 games)
- Highest attendance: Sheriff 3-0 Zimbru 2,300
- Lowest attendance: Academia 0-2 Zimbru; Dacia 2-0 Academia; Dinamo-Auto 1-3 Zaria 200
- Average attendance: 998
- All statistics correct as of 24 August 2016.

The 2016–17 Moldovan National Division (Romanian: Divizia Națională) is the 26th season of top-tier football in Moldova. The competition began on 23 July 2016 and ended in May 2017.

== Stadia and locations ==
Location of teams in National Division 2016–17

| Club | Location | Stadium | Capacity |
|---|---|---|---|
| CS Petrocub | Sărata-Galbenă | Stadionul Orășenesc Hîncești | 1,500 |
| Academia Chișinău | Chișinău | Ghidighici Stadium | 1,500 |
| CF Ungheni | Ungheni | Stadionul Mircea Eliade | 2,500 |
| Dacia Chișinău | Chișinău | Stadionul Moldova (Speia) | 8,550 |
| Dinamo-Auto Tiraspol | Tiraspol | Dinamo-Auto Stadium | 1,300 |
| Milsami Orhei | Orhei | CSR Orhei | 2,539 |
| Zaria Bălți | Bălți | Stadionul Orășenesc Bălți | 5,953 |
| Sheriff Tiraspol | Tiraspol | Sheriff Stadium | 12,746 |
| CSF Speranța | Nisporeni | Stadionul Mircea Eliade | 2,500 |
| Zimbru Chișinău | Chișinău | Zimbru Stadium | 10,400 |
| Saxan Gagauz Yeri | Ceadîr-Lunga | Ceadîr-Lunga Stadium | 2,000 |

=== Personnel and sponsorship ===
| Team | Head coach | Captain | Kit manufacturer | Shirt sponsor |
|---|---|---|---|---|
| Petrocub-Hîncești | (Moldova) Iurie Osipenco | (Moldova) Maxim Focșa | Sportika | MAIB |
| Academia | (Moldova) Serghei Secu | (Moldova) Eugen Celeadnic | Sportika | |
| Ungheni | (Moldova) Igor Ursachi | (Moldova) Roman Gușan | Kelme | Bricone |
| Dacia | (Moldova) Viorel Frunză | (Moldova) Simeon Bulgaru | Puma | OM |
| Dinamo-Auto | (Moldova) Iurie Groșev | (Moldova) Dumitru Popovici | Joma | |
| Milsami | (Moldova) Adrian Sosnovschi | (Moldova) Vadim Bolohan | Kelme | Dufremol |
| Zaria | (Moldova) Vlad Goian | (Moldova) Alexandru Onica | Joma | Bălți |
| Sheriff | (Italy) Roberto Bordin | (Croatia) Josip Brezovec | Adidas | IDC |
| Speranța | (Moldova) Cristian Efros | (Moldova) Mihail Bolun | Nike | Orom-Imexpo |
| Zimbru | (Romania) Ștefan Stoica | (Moldova) Denis Rusu | Joma | Favorit-Tur |
| Saxan | (Moldova) Ivan Tabanov | (Ivory Coast) Ismaila Soro | Kelme | Gagauz Yeri |

== Managerial changes ==
| Team | Outgoing manager | Manner of departure | Date of vacancy | Position in table | Incoming manager | Date of appointment |
|---|---|---|---|---|---|---|
| Zaria Bălți | (Ukraine) Ihor Rakhayev | Mutual consent | 9 June 2016 | preseason | (Moldova) Vlad Goian | 10 June 2016 |
| FC Sheriff | (Croatia) Zoran Vulić | Mutual consent | 16 June 2016 | preseason | (France) Bruno Irles | 20 June 2016 |
| CF Ungheni | (Moldova) Dorin Bambuleac | Mutual consent | 22 June 2016 | preseason | (Romania) Constantin Arbănaș & (Moldova) Igor Ursachi | 22 June 2016 |
| FC Sheriff | (France) Bruno Irles | Mutual consent | 23 September 2016 | preseason | (Italy) Roberto Bordin | 4 October 2016 |

== League table ==
| Pos | Team | Pld | W | D | L | GF | GA | GD | Pts | Qualification or relegation |
|---|---|---|---|---|---|---|---|---|---|---|
| 1 | Sheriff Tiraspol (C) | 30 | 22 | 3 | 5 | 71 | 15 | +56 | 69 (Note: According to section 10.5 of the Moldovan Football Championship Regulations, 2016-2017 Edition, an extra match was played to determine the Moldovan champions. The match was played on 30 May 2017 and was won by Sheriff Tiraspol who became league champions.) | Qualification for the Champions League second qualifying round |
| 2 | Dacia Chișinău | 30 | 22 | 3 | 5 | 54 | 15 | +39 | 69 | Qualification for the Europa League first qualifying round (Note: Since the winners of 2016–17 Moldovan Cup, Sheriff Tiraspol, qualified for European competition based on their league position, the spot awarded to the Cup winner (Europa League first qualifying round) was passed to the next best-placed team (in this case to the fourth-placed team).) |
| 3 | Milsami Orhei | 30 | 22 | 2 | 6 | 57 | 20 | +37 | 68 | Qualification for the Europa League first qualifying round |
| 4 | Zaria Bălți | 30 | 20 | 5 | 5 | 56 | 21 | +35 | 65 | Qualification for the Europa League first qualifying round |
| 5 | Zimbru Chișinău | 30 | 13 | 7 | 10 | 32 | 29 | +3 | 46 | |
| 6 | Petrocub Hîncești | 30 | 8 | 10 | 12 | 31 | 38 | −7 | 34 | |
| 7 | Speranța Nisporeni | 30 | 7 | 8 | 15 | 24 | 35 | −11 | 29 | |
| 8 | Academia Chișinău | 30 | 8 | 3 | 19 | 21 | 52 | −31 | 27 | Withdrew (Note: Academia Chișinău completed the season but withdrew from the league prior to the start of the next season.) |
| 9 | Dinamo-Auto Tiraspol | 30 | 5 | 8 | 17 | 31 | 58 | −27 | 23 | |
| 10 | Saxan (R) | 30 | 5 | 4 | 21 | 23 | 57 | −34 | 19 | Relegation to Division "A" |
| 11 | Ungheni (R) | 30 | 4 | 5 | 21 | 19 | 79 | −60 | 17 | Relegation to Division "A" |

Source: FMF, UEFA, Soccerway
Rules for classification: 1) Points; 2) Play-off (only if deciding champion when two teams tied); 3) Head-to-head points; 4) Head-to-head goal difference; 5) Head-to-head away goals scored; 6) Head-to-head goals scored; 7) Matches won; 8) Goal difference; 9) Goals scored; 10) Fairplay ranking.
(C) Champions; (R) Relegated

== Gold Match ==
Since Dacia Chișinău and Sheriff Tiraspol finished level on points at the end of the season, a "Gold Match" was played to decide the title. The "home" team (for administrative purposes) was determined by an additional draw held on 23 May 2017.

30 May 2017
20:00 EEST

| Sheriff Tiraspol | 1–1 (a.e.t.) | Dacia Chișinău |
|---|---|---|
| Damașcan 37' | FMF (in Romanian); Soccerway | Posmac 73' |
Penalties
| Ricardinho (penalty scored); Teixeira (penalty scored); Oancea (penalty scored) | 3–0 | (penalty missed) Sarmov; (penalty missed) Isa; (penalty missed) Palavandishvili |

Zimbru Stadium, Chișinău
Attendance: 6,615
Referee: Veaceslav Banari

== Results ==
The schedule consists of three rounds. During the first two rounds, each team plays each other once home-and-away for a total of 20 matches. The pairings of the third round will then be set according to the standings after the first two rounds, giving every team a third game against each opponent for a total of 30 games per team.

=== First and second round ===
| Home \ Away | ACA | DAC | DIN | MIL | PET | SAX | SHE | SPE | UNG | ZAR | ZIM |
|---|---|---|---|---|---|---|---|---|---|---|---|
| Academia Chișinău | — | 0–1 | 1–2 | 0–4 | 2–1 | 1–0 | 0–1 | 3–1 | 4–1 | 0–2 | 0–2 |
| Dacia Chișinău | 2–0 | — | 4–1 | 1–1 | 1–1 | 2–0 | 3–0 | 1–0 | 3–0 | 1–2 | 0–1 |
| Dinamo-Auto Tiraspol | 3–1 | 0–3 | — | 0–4 | 0–1 | 1–0 | 0–1 | 1–4 | 2–2 | 1–3 | 1–1 |
| Milsami Orhei | 2–0 | 1–0 | 4–1 | — | 5–0 | 2–0 | 2–1 | 4–0 | 4–0 | 1–2 | 1–0 |
| Petrocub Hîncești | 0–1 | 0–4 | 3–1 | 0–2 | — | 2–1 | 0–0 | 1–1 | 5–0 | 2–2 | 1–2 |
| Saxan | 1–0 | 0–2 | 0–3 | 0–1 | 2–0 | — | 1–5 | 2–2 | 2–2 | 1–4 | 3–0 |
| Sheriff Tiraspol | 1–0 | 1–0 | 3–0 | 2–0 | 4–0 | 3–0 | — | 2–0 | 7–0 | 1–2 | 3–0 |
| Speranța Nisporeni | 0–1 | 1–2 | 0–0 | 0–2 | 1–0 | 2–1 | 0–2 | — | 3–0 | 0–1 | 0–1 |
| Ungheni | 1–2 | 1–2 | 2–1 | 0–2 | 0–2 | 3–0 | 1–2 | 0–0 | — | 0–3 | 1–1 |
| Zaria Bălți | 6–0 | 1–0 | 2–1 | 0–2 | 0–0 | 2–0 | 0–0 | 0–2 | 3–0 | — | 3–0 |
| Zimbru Chișinău | 2–0 | 0–1 | 1–0 | 1–0 | 0–0 | 2–0 | 1–4 | 2–0 | 4–0 | 0–1 | — |

Source: Moldovan Football Federation (in Romanian)
Legend: Blue = home team win; Yellow = draw; Red = away team win.

=== Third round ===
| Home \ Away | ACA | DAC | DIN | MIL | PET | SAX | SHE | SPE | UNG | ZAR | ZIM |
|---|---|---|---|---|---|---|---|---|---|---|---|
| Academia Chișinău | — | 0–4 | 1–1 | — | 0–0 | — | — | — | 0–1 | 0–4 | — |
| Dacia Chișinău | — | — | 4–1 | — | 1–0 | — | — | — | 3–0 | 1–0 | 3–1 |
| Dinamo-Auto Tiraspol | — | — | — | 0–1 | 2–2 | 2–0 | 0–0 | — | — | — | 1–1 |
| Milsami Orhei | 3–2 | 0–0 | — | — | — | 3–1 | — | 1–0 | — | 2–0 | — |
| Petrocub Hîncești | — | — | — | 3–1 | — | 1–0 | 0–2 | 0–0 | — | — | 1–1 |
| Saxan | 1–0 | 2–3 | — | — | — | — | — | 0–1 | 3–0 | 1–1 | — |
| Sheriff Tiraspol | 1–2 | 0–1 | — | 5–0 | — | 7–1 | — | 4–1 | — | — | — |
| Speranța Nisporeni | 0–0 | 0–1 | 4–1 | — | — | — | — | — | 0–1 | 0–0 | — |
| Ungheni | — | — | 2–2 | 0–2 | 0–4 | — | 0–6 | — | — | — | 1–2 |
| Zaria Bălți | — | — | 3–2 | — | 2–1 | — | 0–2 | — | 5–0 | — | 2–0 |
| Zimbru Chișinău | 4–0 | — | — | 1–0 | — | 0–0 | 0–1 | 1–1 | — | — | — |

Source: Moldovan Football Federation (in Romanian)
Legend: Blue = home team win; Yellow = draw; Red = away team win.

== Top goalscorers ==
| Rank | Player | Club | Goals |
|---|---|---|---|
| 1 | (Brazil) Ricardinho | Sheriff | 15 |
| 2 | (Croatia) Josip Brezovec | Sheriff | 12 |
| 3 | (France) Cheikh-Alan Diarra | Dacia (5) & Dinamo-Auto (4) | 9 |
| 3 | (Moldova) Sergiu Plătică | Speranța | 9 |
| 5 | (Moldova) Octavian Onofrei | Dinamo-Auto | 8 |
| 5 | (Moldova) Igor Bugaiov | Zaria | 8 |
| 7 | (Ukraine) Maksym Feshchuk | Dacia | 7 |
| 7 | (Russia) Ilya Belous | Milsami | 7 |
| 7 | (Moldova) Viorel Primac | Ungheni | 7 |
| 7 | (Bulgaria) Georgi Sarmov | Dacia | 7 |
| 7 | (Moldova) Maxim Mihaliov | Zaria | 7 |
| 7 | (Croatia) Igor Banović | Milsami | 7 |

== Hat-tricks ==
| Player | Home | Away | Result | Date |
|---|---|---|---|---|
| (Ukraine) Maksym Feshchuk | Dacia | Ungheni | 3–0 | 1 October 2016 |
| (Brazil) Ricardinho | Sheriff | Speranța | 4–1 | 30 April 2017 |
| (Brazil) Ricardinho | Ungheni | Sheriff | 0–6 | 21 May 2017 |

== Clean sheets ==
As of 13 June 2017

| Rank | Player | Club | Clean sheets |
|---|---|---|---|
| 1 | (Moldova) Radu Mîțu | Milsami | 18 |
| 2 | (Moldova) Alexei Koșelev | Sheriff | 17 |
| 2 | (Moldova) Dorian Railean | Dacia | 17 |
| 4 | (Moldova) Denis Rusu | Zimbru | 11 |
| 5 | (Moldova) Vasile Buza | Petrocub | 9 |
| 5 | (Moldova) Serghei Pașcenco | Zaria | 9 |
| 7 | (Moldova) Vladimir Livșiț | Zaria | 6 |
| 7 | (Moldova) Andrei Colibaba | Saxan | 6 |
| 9 | (Moldova) Nicolae Țurcan | Speranța | 5 |

== Disciplinary ==
Updated to matches played on 13 June 2017.

| Rank | Player | Club | Yellow card | Double Yellow Card/Ejection | Red Card | Points |
|---|---|---|---|---|---|---|
| 1 | (Moldova) Eugen Celeadnic | Academia | 10 | 1 | 0 | 12 |
| 2 | (Ivory Coast) Michael Gnolou | Saxan | 6 | 1 | 1 | 11 |
| 3 | (Croatia) Igor Banović | Milsami | 7 | 1 | 0 | 9 |
| 3 | (Moldova) Vasile Rusu | Petrocub | 6 | 0 | 1 | 9 |
| 3 | (Moldova) Alexandru Vremea | Academia | 9 | 0 | 0 | 9 |
| 3 | (Moldova) Alexandru Dedov | Milsami | 9 | 0 | 0 | 9 |
| 3 | (Moldova) Constantin Calmîș | Saxan (4) & Speranța (5) | 9 | 0 | 0 | 9 |
| 8 | (Moldova) Cristin Jalbă | Academia (7) & Dacia Chișinău (1) | 5 | 0 | 1 | 8 |
| 8 | (Moldova) Roman Gușan | Ungheni | 5 | 0 | 1 | 8 |
| 8 | (Moldova) Maxim Antoniuc | Academia (3) & Petrocub (5) | 5 | 0 | 1 | 8 |
| 8 | (Moldova) Vladimir Rassulov | Dinamo-Auto | 8 | 0 | 0 | 8 |
| 8 | (Moldova) Mihai Roșca | Academia | 8 | 0 | 0 | 8 |
| 8 | (Moldova) Vitalie Negru | Speranța (4) & Ungheni (4) | 8 | 0 | 0 | 8 |
