= Jean Theodoro =

Brazilian footballer (born 1993)

Personal information
- Full name: Jean Theodoro Sobrinho
- Date of birth: 25 February 1993 (age 33)
- Place of birth: Poá, Brazil
- Height: 1.79 m (5 ft 10 in)
- Position: Midfielder

Youth career
- 2006–2008: Portuguesa
- 2008–2012: Corinthians

Senior career*
Years	Team	Apps	(Gls)
2012–2014	Corinthians	0	(0)
2012	→ Flamengo (loan)	7	(2)
2013–2014	→ Avaí (loan)	4	(0)
2014	→ Camboriú (loan)	6	(0)
2015	TSV Hartberg	3	(0)
2016	ABC	10	(1)
2016–2017	Zimbru Chișinău	38	(10)
2018	Oeste	4	(0)
2019	Batatais	0	(0)
2020	Olímpia	0	(0)
- * Club domestic league appearances and goals as of 00:51, 7 November 2019 (UTC)

Jean Theodoro Sobrinho (born 25 February 1993) is a Brazilian professional footballer who plays as a midfielder.
