= Eugeniu Rebenja =

Moldovan footballer

Personal information
- Full name: Eugeniu Rebenja
- Date of birth: 5 March 1995 (age 31)
- Place of birth: Tiraspol, Moldova
- Height: 1.88 m (6 ft 2 in)
- Position: Forward

Team information
- Current team: Bălți
- Number: 18

Youth career
- Sheriff Tiraspol

Senior career*
Years	Team	Apps	(Gls)
2013–2017	Sheriff Tiraspol	34	(7)
2013–2014	→ FC Tiraspol (loan)	14	(1)
2017	Speranța Nisporeni	4	(0)
2018–2020	Dinamo-Auto	44	(10)
2020–2021	Petrocub	2	(0)
2021	Florești	17	(4)
2022	Floriana	17	(1)
2022–2023	Zrinski Jurjevac		
2023	Ilzer sv	13	(5)
2023	Florești	14	(1)
2024–	Bălți	21	(5)

International career
2011–2012	Moldova U17	3	(0)
2013	Moldova U19	4	(0)
2015–2017	Moldova U21	13	(2)
- * Club domestic league appearances and goals as of 5 January 2025

Eugeniu Rebenja (born 5 March 1995) is a Moldovan footballer who plays as a forward for Moldovan Super Liga club Bălți.

== Honours ==
Sheriff Tiraspol:

- Divizia Națională: 2015–16, 2016–17
