= Vadim Calugher =

Moldovan footballer

Personal information
- Date of birth: 7 September 1995 (age 31)
- Place of birth: Chișinău, Moldova
- Height: 1.77 m (5 ft 10 in)
- Position: Midfielder

Team information
- Current team: Lotus Băile Felix

Youth career
- –2011: Milsami Orhei

Senior career*
Years	Team	Apps	(Gls)
2011–2015	Milsami Orhei	45	(1)
2015–2016	Zimbru Chișinău	10	(0)
2016	Speranța Nisporeni	1	(0)
2016–2017	Petrocub Hîncești	33	(2)
2018	Sfîntul Gheorghe	10	(2)
2018	Florești	0	(0)
2019	ACS Poli Timișoara	11	(0)
2019	Zimbru Chișinău	10	(1)
2020	Speranța Nisporeni	16	(0)
2021–2023	SCM Zalău	51	(5)
2023–2024	Bihor Oradea	21	(3)
2024–2026	CSM Olimpia Satu Mare	16	(1)
2026–	Lotus Băile Felix	0	(0)

International career
2012–2013	Moldova U19 (Note: Only official UEFA matches included)	6	(0)
2015	Moldova U21	3	(0)
- * Club domestic league appearances and goals as of 9 May 2026

Vadim Calugher (born 7 September 1995) is a Moldovan professional footballer who plays as a midfielder for Liga III club Lotus Băile Felix.

== Honours ==
Milsami Orhei

- Divizia Națională: 2014–15
- Cupa Moldovei: 2011–12
- Supercupa Moldovei: 2012

Bihor Oradea

- Liga III: 2023–24
