= Ibrahim Koné (footballer, born 1995) =

Ivorian footballer

Personal information
- Date of birth: 30 January 1995 (age 31)
- Place of birth: Ouragahio, Côte d'Ivoire
- Height: 1.73 m (5 ft 8 in)
- Position: Attacking midfielder

Youth career
- Egnanda de Zaranou

Senior career*
Years	Team	Apps	(Gls)
2016–2017	Saxan	17	(0)
2017	→ Sheriff Tiraspol (loan)	2	(0)
2017	Slutsk	11	(1)
2019–2020	Haras El Hodoud	41	(3)
2020–2021	Tala'ea El Gaish	23	(2)
2021–2023	Ghazl El Mahalla	39	(1)
- * Club domestic league appearances and goals as of 26 April 2023

Ibrahim Koné (born 30 January 1995) is an Ivorian professional footballer as an attacking midfielder.

== Career ==
Koné played for Saxan and Sheriff Tiraspol in Moldova, then Slutsk in Belarus, before moving to Egypt to join Haras El Hodoud and Tala'ea El Gaish.
