= Artiom Puntus =

Moldovan footballer

Personal information
- Date of birth: 31 May 1995 (age 31)
- Place of birth: Tiraspol, Moldova
- Height: 1.80 m (5 ft 11 in)
- Position: Forward

Youth career
- –2012: Sheriff Tiraspol

Senior career*
Years	Team	Apps	(Gls)
2012–2014	Sheriff-2 Tiraspol	38	(7)
2014–2018	Sheriff Tiraspol	2	(0)
2015	→ Tiraspol (loan)	6	(1)
2015	→ Saxan (loan)	11	(0)
2016–2017	→ Saxan (loan)	11	(2)
2017	→ Petrocub Hîncești (loan)	6	(1)
2018	→ Petrocub Hîncești (loan)	7	(2)
2018	→ Sfîntul Gheorghe (loan)	12	(3)
2019–2020	Petrocub Hîncești	15	(3)
2020–2021	Milsami Orhei	31	(13)
2021–2022	Kukësi	18	(1)
2023–2024	Milsami Orhei	25	(3)
Total		182	(36)

International career^{‡}
2015	Moldova U21	2	(0)
2021–2023	Moldova	4	(0)
- * Club domestic league appearances and goals as of 15 June 2024 ‡ National team caps and goals as of 18 April 2023

Artiom Puntus (born 31 May 1995) is a Moldovan footballer who played as a forward for the Moldova national team.

== Club career ==
Born in Tiraspol, Puntus started his career with Sheriff Tiraspol. On 21 May 2014, he made his Moldovan National Division debut for the club, coming on as a substitute in a 1–0 win over FC Tiraspol. He spent time on loan at FC Tiraspol, Saxan, Petrocub Hîncești and Sfîntul Gheorghe, before joining Petrocub Hîncești on a permanent basis in January 2019. In August 2020, Puntus joined Milsami Orhei, where he went on to score 13 goals in 31 league games. In September 2021, he joined Albanian Kategoria Superiore side Kukësi on a two-year contract.

== International career ==
Puntus featured in two UEFA European Under-21 Championship qualification matches for Moldova in 2015. He made his debut for the Moldova national team on 9 October 2021, coming on as a substitute in a FIFA World Cup qualification match against Denmark.
