= Khalifa Jabbie =

Sierra Leonean footballer

Personal information
- Full name: Khalifa Jabbie
- Date of birth: January 20, 1993 (age 33)
- Place of birth: Freetown, Sierra Leone
- Height: 1.93 m (6 ft 4 in)
- Position: Central midfielder

Team information
- Current team: East Grinstead Town

Senior career*
Years	Team	Apps	(Gls)
2009–2011	Kallon	39	(4)
2011–2014	Fredrikstad	70	(3)
2014–2015	Balıkesirspor	24	(1)
2015–2017	Sheriff Tiraspol	30	(1)
2018–2019	Racing Beirut	19	(0)
2019	Cheshunt	2	(0)
2021	Sfîntul Gheorghe	0	(0)
2021–2023	Al-Mina'a		
2023–2024	Haringey Borough	34	(0)
2024–	East Grinstead Town	0	(0)

International career^{‡}
2011–	Sierra Leone	21	(1)
- * Club domestic league appearances and goals as of 21 October 2024 ‡ National team caps and goals as of 15 October 2015

Khalifa Jabbie (born 20 January 1993) is a Sierra Leonean professional footballer who plays as a central midfielder for Southern Combination Premier Division club East Grinstead Town and the Sierra Leone national team.

Jabbie made his full international debut for Sierra Leone on 17 March 2011, against Niger in a 2012 Africa Cup of Nations qualification game.

== Football career ==
Khalifa Jabbie was born in Freetown, Sierra Leone, to parents from the Mandingo ethnic group. As a youngster, Jabbie was considered one of the top young footballers in Sierra Leone. In 2010, he signed for FC Kallon, one of the top clubs in the Sierra Leone National Premier League, at the age of seventeen. He also captained the Sierra Leone national under-20 team. Jabbie was scouted by popular agent Chernor Musa Jalloh and Swedish Patrick Mork that introduce him to FFK. He joined Fredrikstad FK in Norway on a three-year contract. Jabbie made his full international debut for Sierra Leone on March 27, 2011, against Niger in a 2012 Africa Cup of Nations qualification played in Niamey. On 19 December 2013, he signed a 2.5 year contract with TFF First League team Balıkesirspor in Turkey.

In October 2024, Jabbie joined Isthmian League South East Division side East Grinstead Town.

== Career statistics ==
=== Club ===
As of match played 30 May 2017

Appearances and goals by club, season and competition
Club	Season	League			National Cup		League Cup		Continental		Other		Total	
Club	Season	Division	Apps	Goals	Apps	Goals	Apps	Goals	Apps	Goals	Apps	Goals	Apps	Goals
Fredrikstad	2011	Tippeligaen	24	2	5	0	-		-		-		29	2
Fredrikstad	2012	Tippeligaen	27	1	2	0	-		-		-		29	1
Fredrikstad	2013	Tippeligaen	19	0	2	0	-		-		-		21	0
Fredrikstad	Total		70	3	9	0	-	-	-	-	-	-	79	3
Balıkesirspor	2013–14	TFF First League	14	0	0	0	-		-		-		14	0
Balıkesirspor	2014–15	Süper Lig	10	1	1	0	-		-		-		11	1
Balıkesirspor	Total		24	1	1	0	-	-	-	-	-	-	25	1
Sheriff Tiraspol	2015–16	Divizia Națională	10	0	2	0	-		0	0	0	0	12	0
Sheriff Tiraspol	2016–17	Divizia Națională	20	1	3	0	-		0	0	1	0	24	1
Sheriff Tiraspol	Total		30	1	5	0	-	-	0	0	1	0	36	1
Career total			124	5	15	0	-	-	0	0	1	0	140	5

=== International ===
Sierra Leone national team
Year	Apps	Goals
2011	2	0
2012	4	0
2013	2	0
2014	6	1
Total	14	1

Statistics accurate as of match played 11 October 2014

=== International goals ===
#	Date	Venue	Opponent	Score	Result	Competition
1.	19 July 2014	National Stadium, Freetown, Sierra Leone	Seychelles	2–0	2–0	2015 Africa Cup of Nations qualification
