= Victor Oliveira =

Brazilian footballer

Personal information
- Full name: Victor Oliveira
- Date of birth: 28 May 1994 (age 32)
- Place of birth: Conceição do Araguaia, Brazil
- Height: 1.90 m (6 ft 3 in)
- Position: Centre back

Youth career
- Corinthians

Senior career*
Years	Team	Apps	(Gls)
2014	Atlético Goianiense	26	(2)
2015–2017	Fluminense	15	(0)
2016	→ Joinville (loan)	16	(0)
2017–2018	Sheriff Tiraspol	11	(0)
2018–2020	Tombense	2	(0)
2018	→ Atlético Goianiense (loan)	6	(0)
2019	→ Paysandu (loan)	30	(2)
2020	→ Figueirense (loan)	10	(1)
2021	Sampaio Corrêa	6	(0)
2021	Santa Cruz	0	(0)
2021–2022	Barra	0	(0)
2022	Krabi	13	(0)
2023	Rajpracha	13	(1)
2024	Bangu	11	(0)
2024	Aparecidense	2	(0)
2024	Chiangrai United	9	(0)
- * Club domestic league appearances and goals as of 25 December 2024

Victor Oliveira (born 28 May 1994) is a Brazilian footballer as a central defender.

== Club career ==
Born in Conceição do Araguaia, Pará, Victor Oliveira graduated with Corinthians' youth setup. In 2013, he joined Atlético Goianiense, after impressing on a trial at the club.

On 22 July 2014, Victor Oliveira made his professional debut, coming on as a second-half substitute for Thiago Feltri in a 4–2 home win against Oeste for the Série B championship. He scored his first goal on 15 August, netting the last in a 2–1 home success against Paraná.

On 23 December 2014, Victor Oliveira signed a three-year deal with Fluminense.
