= Oleh Yermak =

Ukrainian footballer (born 1986)

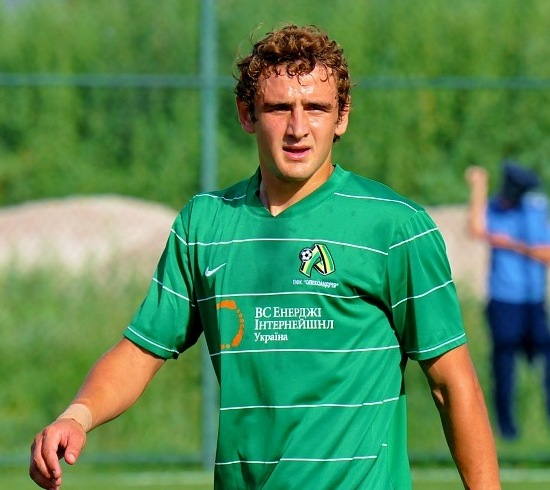

Personal information
- Full name: Oleh Vasylyovych Yermak
- Date of birth: 9 March 1986 (age 40)
- Place of birth: Okhtyrka, Soviet Union (now Ukraine)
- Height: 1.75 m (5 ft 9 in)
- Position: Defender

Team information
- Current team: imeni V.Z. Tura

Youth career
- 1998–2002: Naftovyk Okhtyrka

Senior career*
Years	Team	Apps	(Gls)
2001–2002	Naftovyk Okhtyrka	3	(0)
2002	→ Naftovyk-2 Okhtyrka (amateurs)	5	(0)
2002–2009	Shakhtar Donetsk	0	(0)
2002–2004	→ Shakhtar-3 Donetsk	22	(0)
2004–2006	→ Shakhtar-2 Donetsk	28	(0)
2007	→ Arsenal Kyiv (loan)	4	(0)
2007	→ Nosta Novotroitsk (loan)	15	(2)
2008–2009	→ Zorya Luhansk (loan)	11	(0)
2009–2010	Krymteplytsia Molodizhne	26	(7)
2011	Oleksandriya	15	(0)
2012–2014	Naftovyk-Ukrnafta Okhtyrka	36	(5)
2014–2015	Tiraspol	16	(1)
2016	Kolos Kovalivka	4	(0)
2016–2018	Zaria Bălți	38	(2)
2019–2020	Svitanok-Ahrosvit Shlyakhova (amateurs)	9	(0)
2020–2021	Voronivka (amateurs)	0	(0)
2021–	imeni V.Z. Tura (amateurs)	0	(0)

International career
2001	Ukraine U16	2	(0)
2002–2003	Ukraine U17	12	(0)
2004	Ukraine U18	9	(0)
2004–2005	Ukraine U19	9	(0)
- * Club domestic league appearances and goals

Oleh Vasylyovych Yermak (Ukrainian: Олег Васильович Єрмак; born 9 March 1986) is a Ukrainian amateur and former professional football defender who plays for Ukrainian club imeni V.Z. Tura.
