= Stadionul Mircea Eliade =

Football stadium in Moldova

Coordinates: 47.078931°N 28.180499°E

- Interactive map of Stadionul Mircea Eliade
- Full name: Stadionul Mircea Eliade Nisporeni
- Former names: Stadion Orăşenesc
- Location: Nisporeni
- Owner: CSF Speranța
- Capacity: 2,500
- Surface: Artificial Turf
- Field size: 100 x 70 m

Construction
- Opened: 2015

Tenant
- Speranis Nisporeni

Stadionul Mircea Eliade is a football stadium in Moldova built in 2015. It is based in city Nisporeni. It was used for football matches and served as the home for Speranța Nisporeni of the Moldovan Super Liga and for Speranis Nisporeni in Moldovan Liga 1.

In 2015 it was announced that another stadium would be built with the support of the Moldovan Football Federation. The new Nisporeni Stadium opened in 2021.
