= Malaya Sportivnaya Arena =

Sports venue in Tiraspol, Moldova

Coordinates: 46.8404°N 29.5579°E

Malaya Sportivnaya Arena (literally Small Sports Arena) is a multi-use stadium in Tiraspol, Moldova. It is currently used mostly for football matches, and hosts FC Sheriff Tiraspol's reserve team games, as well as some FC Dinamo Bender and FC Tiraspol matches. It is located in the Sheriff Sports Complex, alongside the larger Sheriff Stadium, where the Sheriff Tiraspol senior team plays. The stadium was built in 2002 and has an all-seated capacity of 8,000, making it the third-largest stadium in Moldova. The pitch is surrounded by a six-lane running track.
