= Vladimir Livșiț =

Moldovan footballer

Vladimir Livşiţ
Personal information
- Full name: Vladimir Livşiţ
- Date of birth: 24 March 1984 (age 42)
- Place of birth: Moldova
- Height: 1.88 m (6 ft 2 in)
- Position: Goalkeeper

Senior career*
Years	Team	Apps	(Gls)
2008–2009	Tiligul-Tiras	12	(0)
2009–2010	Pandurii Târgu Jiu	0	(0)
2010–2011	Costuleni	27	(0)
2012–2013	Rapid Ghidighici	30	(0)
2013–2015	Tiraspol	10	(0)
2015–2018	Zaria Bălți	58	(0)
2019–2020	Shimshon Kafr Qasim	5	(0)
2020–2021	F.C. Haifa Robi Shapira	21	(0)
2021–2022	Hapoel Bu'eine	33	(0)
2022	Ahva Reineh	5	(0)
2022–2023	Hapoel Migdal HaEmek	0	(0)
2023–2024	Maccabi Neve Sha'anan	5	(0)
- * Club domestic league appearances and goals as of 1 June 2024 (UTC)

Vladimir Livşiţ (born 24 March 1984) is a Moldovan footballer who plays for Ahva Reineh.
