= Vladislav Ivanov (footballer, born 1990) =

Moldovan footballer

Personal information
- Full name: Vladislav Ivanov
- Date of birth: 7 May 1990 (age 36)
- Place of birth: Tiraspol, Moldovan SSR
- Height: 1.83 m (6 ft 0 in)
- Position: Attacking midfielder

Youth career
- 2007–2010: Sheriff Tiraspol

Senior career*
Years	Team	Apps	(Gls)
2007–2010	Sheriff-2 Tiraspol	28	(11)
2011	Academia Chişinău	8	(0)
2011	Milsami-2 Ursidos	4	(0)
2012	Sfântul Gheorghe	6	(0)
2012–2014	Costuleni	58	(13)
2014	Veris Chișinău	10	(0)
2015–2016	Dinamo-Auto Tiraspol	25	(5)
2016	Sheriff Tiraspol	10	(0)
2017	Dinamo-Auto Tiraspol	9	(2)
2017	Krumkachy Minsk	13	(1)
2018	Petrocub Hîncești	18	(3)

International career^{‡}
2013–2018	Moldova	10	(0)
- * Club domestic league appearances and goals as of 31 December 2018 ‡ National team caps and goals as of 26 February 2018

Vladislav Ivanov (born 7 May 1990) is a former football player from Moldova. He was also a member of Moldova national football team since 2013.

== Career ==
In 2016 he played for Sheriff Tiraspol.
