= Vitalie Bordian =

Moldovan football defender

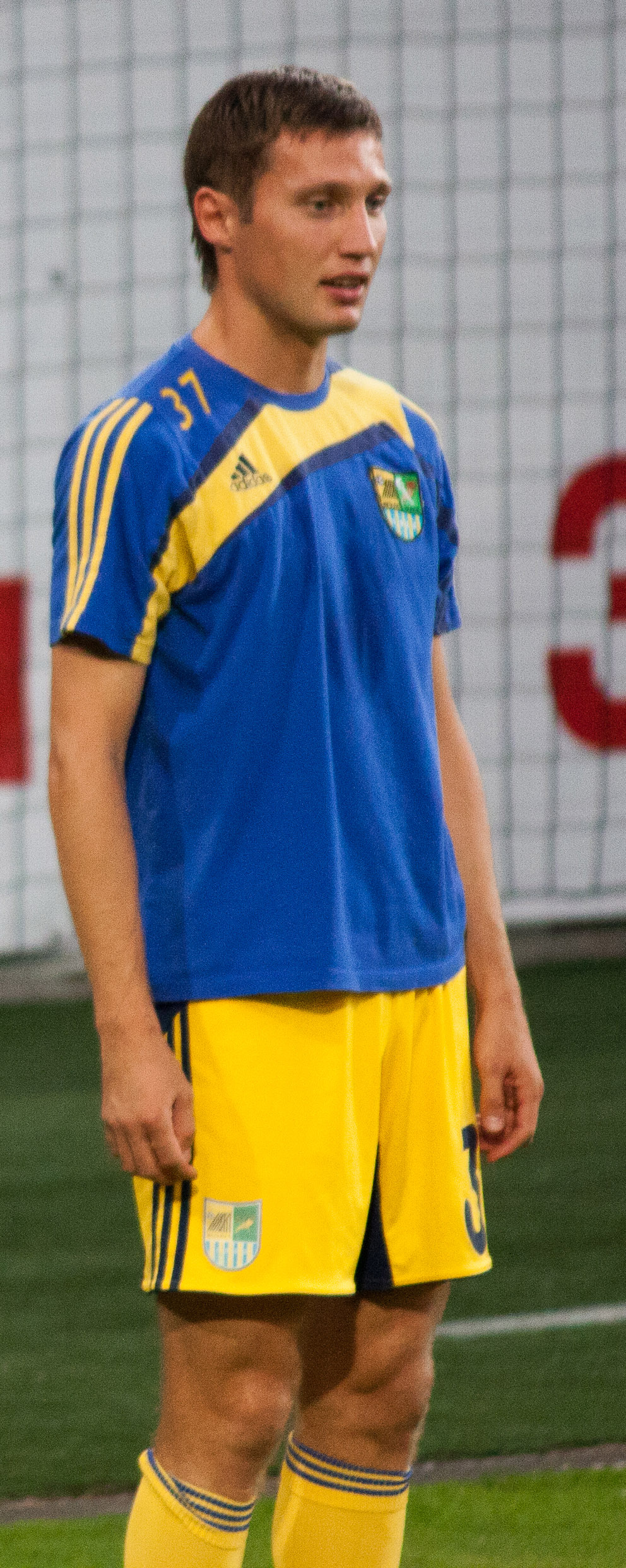
- Bordian with Metalist Kharkiv in 2010

Personal information
- Date of birth: 11 August 1984 (age 42)
- Place of birth: Chişinău, Moldavian SSR, Soviet Union
- Height: 1.76 m (5 ft 9 1/2 in)
- Position: Defender

Team information
- Current team: FV Austria XIII
- Number: 11

Senior career*
Years	Team	Apps	(Gls)
2001	Zimbru Chişinău	2	(0)
2002–2004	Lokomotiv Moscow	0	(0)
2005–2012	Metalist Kharkiv	162	(7)
2012–2013	Hoverla Uzhhorod	10	(0)
2013–2014	Volga Nizhny Novgorod	17	(0)
2014	Veris Chișinău	3	(0)
2015	Helios Kharkiv	15	(0)
2016	Dacia Chişinău	8	(0)
2016–2017	Sheriff Tiraspol	25	(0)
2018–2019	Dinamo-Auto Tiraspol	32	(0)
2020–	FV Austria XIII	132	(10)

International career
2000–2005	Moldova U21	16	(0)
2005–2017	Moldova	48	(1)
- * Club domestic league appearances and goals as of 4 March 2023

Vitalie Bordian (born 11 August 1984) is a Moldovan football defender who plays for FV Austria XIII in the Austrian fourth-tier Wiener Stadtliga.

== Career ==
Bordian began his professional football career in the Moldovan capital Chişinău in 2001. In 2002, he was bought off to Russian Premier League club Lokomotiv Moscow. There he played for until 2004.

He signed a three-year contract with FC Metalist Kharkiv in January 2005. He signed a new contract last until 2012 in December 2008.

He played 8 games in UEFA Euro 2008 qualifying.

In December 2008, Bordian was voted the best footballer of Moldova in 2008. He got 117 points compared to second place Alexandru Epureanu from FC Moscow with 40 points.

== Career statistics ==
=== International ===
Appearances and goals by national team and year
National team	Year	Apps	Goals
Moldova	2005	3	0
Moldova	2006	–	
Moldova	2007	9	1
Moldova	2008	5	0
Moldova	2009	–	
Moldova	2010	5	0
Moldova	2011	3	0
Moldova	2012	2	0
Moldova	2013	7	0
Moldova	2014	2	0
Moldova	2015	3	0
Moldova	2016	3	0
Moldova	2017	6	0
Total		48	1

Scores and results list Moldova's goal tally first, score column indicates score after each Bordian goal.

List of international goals scored by Vitalie Bordian
No.	Date	Venue	Opponent	Score	Result	Competition
1	22 August 2007	Skonto Stadium, Riga, Latvia	Latvia	2–1	2–1	Friendly
