= Mihai Roșca =

Moldovan footballer

Personal information
- Date of birth: 26 March 1995 (age 31)
- Place of birth: Chișinău, Moldova
- Height: 1.82 m (5 ft 11 1/2 in)
- Position: Defender

Senior career*
Years	Team	Apps	(Gls)
2013–2016	Dacia Chișinău	27	(4)
2015–2016	→ Academia Chișinău (loan)	12	(0)
2016–2017	Academia Chișinău	23	(1)
2017	Dinamo-Auto Tiraspol	13	(1)
2018	UTA Arad	12	(1)
2018–2019	Minaur Baia Mare		

International career^{‡}
2011–2012	Moldova U17	0	(0)
2013–2014	Moldova U19	3	(0)
- * Club domestic league appearances and goals as of 16 September 2018 ‡ National team caps and goals as of 18 November 2013

Mihai Roșca (born 26 March 1995) is a Moldavian football defender.

== Club statistics ==
- Total matches played in Moldovan National Division: 75 matches – 6 goals
