= Guga Palavandishvili =

Georgian footballer

Personal information
- Date of birth: 14 August 1993 (age 33)
- Place of birth: Tbilisi, Georgia
- Height: 1.73 m (5 ft 8 in)
- Position: Defensive midfielder

Youth career
- 2005–2011: Gagra

Senior career*
Years	Team	Apps	(Gls)
2011–2013	Gagra	42	(2)
2014	Dinamo Tbilisi II	11	(0)
2014–2016	Dila Gori	51	(1)
2016–2017	Torpedo Kutaisi	13	(0)
2017	Dacia Chișinău	8	(0)
2017–2018	Torpedo Kutaisi	16	(0)
2018–2019	Podbeskidzie	40	(1)
2019–2020	Ventspils	13	(0)
2020–2021	Lamia	14	(0)
2021–2023	Dinamo Batumi	29	(1)

International career
2015	Georgia	1	(0)
- * Club domestic league appearances and goals as of 14 August 2024

Guga Palavandishvili (Georgian: გუგა ფალავანდიშვილი; born 14 August 1993) is a Georgian professional footballer who plays as a midfielder.

== Career ==
=== International career ===
Palavandishvili made his international debut for Georgia on 8 October 2015 in a 4–0 win against Gibraltar in the Euro 2016 qualifiers.

== Honours ==
Dila Gori

- Umaglesi Liga: 2014–15

Dinamo Batumi

- Georgian Super Cup: 2022
