= 2013–14 Moldovan National Division =

Moldovan National Division
- Season: 2013–14
- Champions: FC Sheriff Tiraspol
- Relegated: FC Speranța Crihana Veche, FC Rapid Ghidighici
- Matches: 183
- Goals: 544 (2.97 per match)
- Top goalscorer: Henrique Luvannor (26 goals)
- Biggest home win: Sheriff 8–0 Academia
- Biggest away win: Academia 0–7 Sheriff
- Highest scoring: Dacia 7–1 Academia; Sheriff 8–0 Academia
- Longest winning run: Sheriff Tiraspol (9 games)
- Longest unbeaten run: Sheriff Tiraspol; FC Tiraspol (19 games)
- Longest losing run: Speranța Crihana Veche (19 games)
- Highest attendance: Zimbru Chișinău 4.500
- Lowest attendance: Dacia Chișinău 0
- Average attendance: Zimbru Chișinău 2.350

The 2013–14 Moldovan National Division (Romanian: Divizia Națională) is the 23rd season of top-tier football in Moldova. The competition began in July 2013 and ended in May 2014.

== Teams ==
=== Stadia and locations ===
Location of teams in National Division 2013–14

=== Personnel and sponsorship ===
Team	Home city	Head coach	Captain	Kit manufacturer	Shirt sponsor
Academia	Chișinău	(Moldova) Vitalie Mostovoi	(Moldova) Radu Gînsari	Macron	–
Costuleni	Costuleni	(Romania) Marian Pană	(Moldova) Mihail Moraru	Joma	Cavio
Dacia	Chișinău	(Moldova) Igor Negrescu	(Moldova) Eugen Matiughin	Puma	–
Dinamo-Auto	Tiraspol	(Moldova) Dumitru Arabadji	(Moldova) Eugen Hmaruc	Umbro	Ipotecniy
Milsami	Orhei	(Romania) Ștefan Stoica	(Moldova) Gheorghe Boghiu	Joma	Dufremol
Olimpia	Bălți	(Moldova) Igor Ursachi	(Ukraine) Artem Kozlov	Acerbis	Simtravel
Rapid	Ghidighici	(Ukraine) Vladimir Lyutyi	(Moldova) Vitalie Plămădeală	Legea	–
Sheriff	Tiraspol	(Moldova) Veaceslav Rusnac	(Slovenia) Miral Samardžić	Adidas	IDC
Speranța	Crihana Veche	(Moldova) Serghei Dubrovin	(Moldova) Eugen Gorceac	Jako	–
Tiraspol	Tiraspol	(Moldova) Vlad Goian	(Moldova) Alexandru Popovici	Adidas	Tirotex
Veris	Chișinău	(Romania) Dănuț Oprea	(Moldova) Viorel Frunză	Joma	Moldcell
Zimbru	Chișinău	(Moldova) Sergiu Cleșcenco	(Moldova) Nicolae Calancea	Puma	Obolon

Club	Location	Stadium	Capacity
Academia Chișinău	Chișinău	Stadionul CPSN	1,000
FC Costuleni	Costuleni	CSR Orhei	2,539
Rapid Ghidighici	Ghidighici	Ghidighici Stadium	1,500
Dacia Chișinău	Chișinău	Stadionul Moldova (Speia)	8,550
Dinamo-Auto Tiraspol	Tiraspol	Dinamo-Auto Stadium	3,525
Milsami Orhei	Orhei	CSR Orhei	2,539
Olimpia Bălți	Bălți	Olimpia Bălți Stadium	5,953
Speranța Crihana Veche	Crihana Veche	Ghidighici Stadium	1,500
Sheriff Tiraspol	Tiraspol	Sheriff Stadium	13,460
FC Tiraspol	Tiraspol	Sheriff Stadium	13,460
Veris Chișinău	Chișinău	Stadionul CPSN	1,000
Zimbru Chișinău	Chișinău	Zimbru Stadium	10,600

== League table ==
Pos	Team	Pld	W	D	L	GF	GA	GD	Pts	Qualification or relegation
1	Sheriff Tiraspol (C)	33	28	3	2	98	16	+82	87	Qualification for the Champions League second qualifying round
2	Tiraspol	33	21	9	3	60	27	+33	72	Qualification for the Europa League first qualifying round (Note: Zimbru Chișinău have qualified for the first qualifying round of the 2014–15 UEFA Europa League as winners of the 2013–14 Moldovan Cup.)
3	Veris Chișinău	33	21	8	4	74	25	+49	71	Qualification for the Europa League first qualifying round
4	Zimbru Chișinău	33	18	7	8	56	24	+32	61 (Note: ZIM: 7pts; DAC: 1pt)	Qualification for the Europa League first qualifying round
5	Dacia Chișinău	33	18	7	8	68	29	+39	61	
6	Milsami Orhei	33	17	5	11	54	32	+22	56	
7	Costuleni	33	16	4	13	43	33	+10	52	
8	Dinamo-Auto Tiraspol	33	9	4	20	37	72	−35	31	
9	Rapid Ghidighici (Note: Rapid Ghidighici were deducted two points because of debts owed to players Ovidiu Mendizov and Vladimir Livșiț.) (R)	33	6	4	23	27	75	−48	20	Team withdrew and were relegated to Division "B"
10	Academia Chișinău	33	5	4	24	26	88	−62	19	
11	Olimpia Bălți	33	5	3	25	26	77	−51	18	Spared from relegation
12	Speranța Crihana Veche (Note: Speranța Crihana Veche were deducted three points) (R)	33	4	2	27	20	91	−71	11	Relegation to Division "A"

Source: Moldovan Football Federation (in Romanian)
Rules for classification: 1st points; 2nd head-to-head points; 3rd head-to-head goal difference; 4th head-to-head goals scored; 5th goal difference; 6th number of goals scored; 7th Fair Play competition
(C) Champions; (R) Relegated

=== Positions by round ===
The following table represents the teams position after each round in the competition.

Team ╲ Round	1	2	3	4	5	6	7	8	9	10	11	12	13	14	15	16	17	18	19	20	21	22	23	24	25	26	27	28	29	30	31	32	33
Sheriff Tiraspol	5	8	5	4	2	1	1	1	1	1	1	1	1	1	1	1	1	1	1	1	1	1	1	1	1	1	1	1	1	1	1	1	1
Tiraspol	8	3	2	1	1	2	2	2	2	2	4	5	4	3	3	2	2	2	2	2	2	2	2	2	2	2	2	2	2	2	2	2	2
Veris Chișinău	2	2	4	2	5	3	3	3	3	4	3	2	2	4	4	4	3	3	3	3	4	4	4	4	4	4	4	3	3	3	3	3	3
Costuleni	9	11	10	7	9	7	5	6	5	5	6	4	3	2	2	3	4	4	4	5	5	6	6	5	6	7	7	6	6	7	7	7	7
Dacia Chișinău	7	9	6	6	4	5	7	5	4	3	2	3	5	5	5	5	6	7	5	4	3	3	3	3	3	3	3	4	4	4	5	5	5
Milsami Orhei	1	1	3	5	3	4	4	4	6	7	7	7	6	7	6	7	7	5	6	6	6	5	5	7	5	6	6	7	7	6	6	6	6
Zimbru Chișinău	6	4	1	3	6	6	8	8	8	6	5	6	7	6	7	6	5	6	7	7	7	7	7	6	7	5	5	5	5	5	4	4	4
Rapid Ghidighici	4	5	8	9	7	8	6	7	7	8	8	8	8	9	8	8	8	8	8	9	9	9	9	9	9	9	9	9	9	9	9	9	9
Dinamo-Auto Tiraspol	3	6	7	8	10	10	10	10	9	9	9	9	9	8	9	9	9	9	9	8	8	8	8	8	8	8	8	8	8	8	8	8	8
Olimpia Bălți	11	10	11	11	11	11	11	11	11	11	11	11	10	10	10	10	10	10	10	10	10	10	10	10	10	10	10	10	10	11	10	11	11
Speranța Crihana Veche	12	7	9	10	8	9	9	9	10	10	10	10	11	11	11	11	11	11	11	11	11	12	12	12	12	12	12	12	12	12	12	12	12
Academia Chișinău	10	12	12	12	12	12	12	12	12	12	12	12	12	12	12	12	12	12	12	12	12	11	11	11	11	11	11	11	11	10	11	10	10

Source: Kicker.de (in German)
= Leader; = 2nd place; = 3rd place; = Relegation

== Results ==
The schedule consists of three rounds. During the first two rounds, each team plays each other once home and away for a total of 22 matches. The pairings of the third round will then be set according to the standings after the first two rounds, giving every team a third game against each opponent for a total of 33 games per team.

=== First and second round ===
Home \ Away	ACA	COS	DAC	DIN	MIL	OLI	RAP	SHE	SCV	TIR	VER	ZIM
Academia Chișinău		0–2	1–2	0–2	0–0	1–1	0–2	0–7	4–2	1–2	0–3	0–3
Costuleni	0–0		0–0	3–0	0–2	5–1	3–0	0–1	1–2	3–1	2–3	1–1
Dacia Chișinău	7–1	0–2		2–0	1–0	2–0	1–1	1–3	7–0	0–0	3–1	1–1
Dinamo-Auto Tiraspol	6–0	0–1	1–2		1–2	2–1	2–1	0–6	3–0	1–3	0–6	0–2
Milsami Orhei	3–0	0–1	1–4	1–0		4–1	3–1	0–2	6–0	0–1	2–0	4–2
Olimpia Bălți	3–1	0–1	1–4	0–1	0–1		3–1	0–5	1–1	0–3	0–3	0–3
Rapid Ghidighici	3–1	2–1	2–4	2–1	1–1	1–1		2–3	4–2	0–3 (Note: Rapid Ghidighici lost its matches against FC Tiraspol, FC Veris and FC Zimbru with 0–3, due to its retirement from championship.)	0–3	0–1
Sheriff Tiraspol	8–0	4–1	1–0	3–0	1–0	3–0	2–0		1–0	1–2	3–0	2–2
Speranța Crihana Veche	1–3	0–1	0–1	1–1	2–3	0–2	0–2	0–5		0–3	0–6	1–0
Tiraspol	2–0	2–1	3–3	1–1	2–1	1–0	1–1	0–3	5–0		0–0	1–0
Veris Chișinău	6–0	1–1	0–0	5–0	0–0	3–0	3–1	2–1	1–0	3–3		1–1
Zimbru Chișinău	3–0	0–1	2–1	0–0	0–0	4–1	3–0	1–1	5–0	1–2	1–0	

Source: Football Association of Moldova
Legend: Blue = home team win; Yellow = draw; Red = away team win.

=== Third round ===
Key numbers for pairing determination (number marks position after 22 games):

23rd round	24th round	25th round	26th round	27th round	28th round
1–12	12–7	2–12	12–8	3–12	12–9
2–11	8–6	3–1	9–7	4–2	10–8
3–10	9–5	4–11	10–6	5–1	11–7
4–9	10–4	5–10	11–5	6–11	1–6
5–8	11–3	6–9	1–4	7–10	2–5
6–7	1–2	7–8	2–3	8–9	3–4

29th round	30th round	31st round	32nd round	33rd round
4–12	12–10	5–12	12–11	6–12
5–3	11–9	6–4	1–10	7–5
6–2	1–8	7–3	2–9	8–4
7–1	2–7	8–2	3–8	9–3
8–11	3–6	9–1	4–7	10–2
9–10	4–5	10–11	5–6	11–1

Home \ Away	ACA	COS	DAC	DIN	MIL	OLI	RAP	SHE	SCV	TIR	VER	ZIM
Academia Chișinău				2–2	0–3	1–0	3–0 (Note: Rapid Ghidighici lost all its matches with 0–3, due to its retirement from championship.)			0–2	1–2	
Costuleni	1–0		2–1		1–2		3–0	0–2				1–2
Dacia Chișinău	4–0				2–0		3–0	2–3			0–1	0–2
Dinamo-Auto Tiraspol		2–1	0–6			4–1	3–0	1–4	0–1			
Milsami Orhei				6–1		1–0	3–0		3–1	0–0	2–3	0–2
Olimpia Bălți		1–2	0–3				3–0	0–5	3–2			
Rapid Ghidighici	0–3			0–3	0–3					0–3	0–3	
Sheriff Tiraspol	4–1				2–0		3–0			1–0	0–0	2–1
Speranța Crihana Veche	1–5	0–1	0–1				3–0	0–6				
Tiraspol		1–0	0–0	4–1		2–1	3–0		2–0			2–1
Veris Chișinău		2–0		3–1		3–0	3–0		3–0	3–3		1–0
Zimbru Chișinău	1–0			2–0		4–1	3–0		2–0			

Source: Football Association of Moldova
Legend: Blue = home team win; Yellow = draw; Red = away team win.

== Top goalscorers ==
Updated to matches played on 21 May 2014.

Rank	Player	Club	Goals
1	(Brazil) (Moldova) Henrique Luvannor	Sheriff Tiraspol	26
2	(Moldova) Viorel Frunză	Veris Chișinău	18
3	(Montenegro) Miloš Krkotić	Dacia Chișinău	14
4	(Bulgaria) Ismail Isa	Sheriff Tiraspol	13
4	(Moldova) Gheorghe Boghiu	Milsami	13
4	(Russia) Sergey Tsyganov	Zimbru Chișinău	13
7	(Brazil) Jhulliam Bonfim	Sheriff Tiraspol	12
8	(Moldova) Denis Calincov	Rapid Ghidighici (2) & Academia Chișinău (8)	10
9	(Moldova) Victor Gonța	Costuleni(3) & Veris Chișinău (6)	9
9	(Brazil) Juninho Potiguar	Sheriff Tiraspol	9

8 goals (4 players)

- (Ukraine) Yevhen Zarichnyuk (Tiraspol)
- (Moldova) Alexandru Dedov (Zimbru Chișinău)
- (Bulgaria) Georgi Karaneychev (Tiraspol)
- (Brazil) Ricardinho (Sheriff Tiraspol)

7 goals (7 players)

- (Moldova) Mihai Țurcan (Veris Chișinău)
- (Moldova) Anatolie Doroș (Veris Chișinău(2) & Rapid Ghidighici (5))
- (Moldova) Oleg Molla (Dacia Chișinău(5) & Tiraspol (2))
- (Moldova) Ghenadie Orbu (Dacia Chișinău)
- (Brazil) Cadú (Sheriff Tiraspol)
- (Moldova) Konstantin Yavorskiy (Milsami)
- (Moldova) Ion Lăcustă (Olimpia)

6 goals (8 players)

- (Moldova) Iurie Levandovschi (Rapid Ghidighici)
- (Nigeria) Maxwell Egwuatu (Costuleni)
- (Moldova) Daniel Pîslă (Costuleni)
- (Moldova) Andrei Bugneac (Costuleni)
- (Moldova) Serghei Alexeev (Veris Chișinău)
- (Moldova) Vladislav Ivanov (Costuleni)
- (Moldova) Radu Gînsari (Zimbru Chișinău)
- (Moldova) Sergiu Ciuico (Dinamo-Auto Tiraspol)

5 goals (10 players)

- (Moldova) Alexandru Sergiu Grosu (Tiraspol)
- (Moldova) Victor Truhanov (Dinamo-Auto Tiraspol)
- (Moldova) Andrei Novicov (Tiraspol)
- (Moldova) Gheorghe Ovseannicov (Dacia Chișinău (4) & Tiraspol (1))
- (Russia) Vasili Pavlov (Dacia Chișinău)
- (Moldova) Vadim Cemîrtan (Costuleni)
- (Brazil) Guilherme de Paula (Milsami)
- (Romania) Bogdan Hauși (Tiraspol)
- (Ukraine) Serhiy Shapoval (Tiraspol)
- (Moldova) Maxim Iurcu (Dinamo-Auto Tiraspol)

4 goals (13 players)

- (Moldova) Stanislav Luca (Rapid Ghidighici)
- (Moldova) Alexandru Antoniuc (Veris Chișinău)
- (Moldova) Artur Pătraș (Milsami)
- (Moldova) Petru Leucă (Milsami)
- (Montenegro) Ivan Knežević (Dacia Chișinău)
- (Moldova) Anatolii Cheptine (Zimbru Chișinău)
- (Moldova) Maxim Mihaliov (Dacia Chișinău)
- (Moldova) Eugen Gorodețchi (Dinamo-Auto Tiraspol)
- (Brazil) Ademar (Zimbru Chișinău)
- (Moldova) Victor Bulat (Tiraspol)
- (Moldova) Octavian Onofrei (Speranța Crihana)
- (Moldova) Constantin Bogdan (Zimbru Chișinău)
- (Moldova) Boris Țugui (Speranța Crihana)

3 goals (16 players)

- (Moldova) Serghei Gheorghiev (Tiraspol (2) & Dinamo-Auto Tiraspol (1))
- (Moldova) Maxim Repinețchi (Olimpia (2) & Academia Chișinău (1))
- (Moldova) Nicolae Milinceanu (Veris Chișinău)
- (Moldova) Dumitru Bacal (Rapid Ghidighici)
- (Moldova) Alexandru Maxim (Academia Chișinău)
- (Montenegro) Radivoje Golubović (Dacia Chișinău)
- (Ivory Coast) Marcel Metoua (Sheriff Tiraspol)
- (Moldova) Gheorghe Andronic (Milsami)
- (Spain) Melli (Sheriff Tiraspol)
- (Moldova) Andrei Marina (Olimpia)
- (Moldova) Alexandru Bejan (Dacia Chișinău)
- (Latvia) Andrejs Kovaļovs (Dacia Chișinău)
- (Moldova) Petru Ojog (Costuleni)
- (Moldova) Petru Racu (Veris Chișinău)
- (Moldova) Andrian Cașcaval (Veris Chișinău)
- (Moldova) Mihai Ungureanu (Olimpia)

2 goals (24 players)

- (Moldova) Vadim Bolohan (Milsami)
- (Moldova) Vadim Crîcimari (Zimbru Chișinău)
- (Moldova) Petru Stîngă (Speranța Crihana)
- (Moldova) Ivan Carandașov (Costuleni)
- (Russia) Arkadi Halperin (Academia Chișinău)
- (Moldova) Maxim Focșa (Academia Chișinău)
- (Russia) Akhmet Barakhoyev (Dacia Chișinău)
- (Moldova) Sergiu Matei (Speranța Crihana)
- (Moldova) Veaceslav Lisa (Sheriff Tiraspol)
- (Moldova) Ion Ursu (Veris Chișinău)
- (Moldova) Andrei Cojocari (Zimbru Chișinău)
- (Moldova) Sergiu Cojocari (Veris Chișinău)
- (Moldova) Maxim Antoniuc (Veris Chișinău)
- (Guinea) Ibrahima Camara (Dacia Chișinău)
- (Moldova) Chiril Covali (Dinamo-Auto Tiraspol)
- (Moldova) Victor Mudrac (Olimpia (1) & Dinamo-Auto Tiraspol (1))
- (Brazil) Fernando (Sheriff Tiraspol)
- (Romania) Cornel Gheți (Milsami)
- (Moldova) Vitalie Plămădeală (Rapid Ghidighici)
- (Russia) Albert Bogatyrev (Olimpia)
- (Moldova) Vadim Rață (Tiraspol)
- (Moldova) Valeriu Tiron (Veris Chișinău)
- (Moldova) Vadim Paireli (Sheriff Tiraspol)
- (Croatia) Karlo Belak (Milsami)

1 goal (70 players)

- (Moldova) Dan Spătaru (Zimbru Chișinău)
- (Belarus) Dzmitry Klimovich (Zimbru Chișinău)
- (Brazil) Quintela (Zimbru Chișinău)
- (France) Jean-Marie Amani (Zimbru Chișinău)
- (Moldova) Radu Catan (Zimbru Chișinău)
- (Moldova) Iulian Erhan (Zimbru Chișinău)
- (Belarus) Kiril Pavlyuchek (Zimbru Chișinău)
- (Serbia) Marko Markovski (Sheriff Tiraspol)
- (Moldova) Alexandru Pașcenco (Sheriff Tiraspol)
- (Slovenia) Miral Samardžić (Sheriff Tiraspol)
- (Israel) Kobi Moyal (Sheriff Tiraspol)
- (Moldova) Valentin Bîrdan (Sheriff Tiraspol)
- (Moldova) Valentin Furdui (Sheriff Tiraspol)
- (Burkina Faso) Wilfried Balima (Sheriff Tiraspol)
- (Moldova) Valerii Macrițchii (Sheriff Tiraspol)
- (Moldova) Vladimir Potlog (Rapid Ghidighici)
- (Moldova) Alexandru Leu (Rapid Ghidighici)
- (Moldova) Dumitru Bogdan (Rapid Ghidighici)
- (Moldova) Ion Arabadji (Rapid Ghidighici)
- (Nigeria) Ovye Monday Shedrack (Milsami)
- (Romania) Rareș Soporan (Milsami)
- (Burkina Faso) Boubacar Ouédraogo (Milsami)
- (Moldova) Vitalie Zlatan (Milsami)
- (Brazil) Lucas De Lima (Milsami)
- (Morocco) Adil Rhaili (Milsami)
- (Moldova) Radu Rogac (Olimpia)
- (Moldova) Iurie Bodean (Olimpia)
- (Moldova) Alexandru Grab (Olimpia)
- (Moldova) Ion Laevschii (Olimpia)
- (Moldova) Danu Bojîi (Olimpia)
- (Moldova) Alexandru Bîcov (Dinamo-Auto Tiraspol)
- (Moldova) Nicolai Rudac (Dinamo-Auto Tiraspol)
- (Moldova) Alexandru Arabadji (Dinamo-Auto Tiraspol)
- (Moldova) Mihail Paseciniuc (Dinamo-Auto Tiraspol)
- (Moldova) Dumitru Dolgov (Dinamo-Auto Tiraspol)
- (Moldova) Maxim Orindas (Speranța Crihana)
- (Moldova) Eugen Gorceac (Speranța Crihana)
- (Moldova) Timur Vâlcu (Speranța Crihana)
- (Moldova) Nichita Semcov (Speranța Crihana)
- (Moldova) Eugen Celeadnic (Speranța Crihana)
- (Moldova) Cristian Cîrlan (Veris Chișinău)
- (Moldova) Ion Popușoi (Veris Chișinău)
- (Moldova) Eugen Zasavițchi (Veris Chișinău)
- (Russia) Pavel Novitskiy (Veris Chișinău)
- (Moldova) Nicolae Josan (Veris Chișinău)
- (Ukraine) Yuri Shevel (Dacia Chișinău)
- (Moldova) Nicolae Orlovschi (Dacia Chișinău)
- (Togo) Arafat Djako (Dacia Chișinău)
- (Moldova) Eugeniu Cociuc (Dacia Chișinău)
- (Moldova) Marian Stoleru (Dacia Chișinău)
- (Nigeria) Jude Ogada (Dacia Chișinău)
- (Ukraine) Volodymyr Zastavnyi (Dacia Chișinău)
- (Moldova) Veaceslav Posmac (Dacia Chișinău)
- (Armenia) Artyom Khachaturov (Tiraspol)
- (Moldova) Igor Poiarcov (Tiraspol)
- (Moldova) Alexandru Popovici (Tiraspol)
- (Nigeria) Charles Newuche (Tiraspol)
- (Moldova) Dumitru Popovici (Tiraspol)
- (Moldova) Eugeniu Rebenja (Tiraspol)
- (Bulgaria) Dimitar Petkov (Tiraspol)
- (Moldova) Alexandru Cheltuială (Costuleni)
- (Moldova) Vitalie Negru (Costuleni)
- (Moldova) Sergiu Sîrbu (Costuleni)
- (Moldova) Oleg Șișchin (Academia Chișinău)
- (Moldova) Ion Burlacu (Academia Chișinău)
- (Moldova) Ștefan Caraulan (Academia Chișinău)
- (Moldova) Dan Cațer (Academia Chișinău)
- (Moldova) Serghei Bobrov (Academia Chișinău)
- (Ivory Coast) Adama Ben Kone (Academia Chișinău)
- (Moldova) Igor Picus (Academia Chișinău)

=== Hat-tricks ===
Key
^{4}	Player scored four goals
^{5}	Player scored five goals

Player	Home	Away	Result	Date
(Moldova) Viorel Frunză	Dinamo-Auto Tiraspol	Veris Chișinău	0–6	14 September 2013
(Montenegro) Miloš Krkotić	Dacia Chișinău	Academia Chișinău	7–1	21 September 2013
(Brazil) Jhulliam Bonfim	Speranța Crihana	Sheriff Tiraspol	0–5	25 September 2013
(Moldova) Viorel Frunză	Academia Chișinău	Veris Chișinău	0–3	8 November 2013
(Moldova) Gheorghe Boghiu	Milsami Orhei	Zimbru Chișinău	4–2	9 November 2013
(Brazil) (Moldova) Henrique Luvannor	Sheriff Tiraspol	Academia Chișinău	8–0	4 December 2013
(Brazil) Jhulliam Bonfim^{4}	Sheriff Tiraspol	Academia Chișinău	8–0	4 December 2013
(Moldova) Viorel Frunză	Veris Chișinău	Olimpia	3–0	21 March 2014
(Moldova) Denis Calincov^{4}	Speranța Crihana	Academia Chișinău	1–5	16 May 2014
(Montenegro) Radivoje Golubović	Dinamo-Auto Tiraspol	Dacia Chișinău	0–6	21 May 2014

=== Clean sheets ===
As of 30 May 2014

Rank	Player	Club	Clean sheets
1	(Moldova) Dumitru Stajila	Sheriff Tiraspol	17
2	(Moldova) Adrian Pătraş	Costuleni	11
3	(Bulgaria) Georgi Georgiev	FC Tiraspol	10
3	(Moldova) Eugen Matiughin	Dacia Chișinău	10
5	(Moldova) Sergiu Diaconu	Veris Chișinău	8
5	(Moldova) Artiom Gaiduchevici	Veris Chișinău	8
7	(Moldova) Andrian Negai	Milsami	7
8	(Moldova) Sergiu Juric	Veris Chișinău (2) & Sheriff Tiraspol (4)	6
9	(Moldova) Nicolae Calancea	Zimbru Chișinău	5
9	(Moldova) Denis Rusu	Zimbru Chișinău	5
9	(Moldova) Gheorghe Bantîş	Milsami	5

== Disciplinary ==
As of 30 May 2014

Rank	Player	Club	Yellow card	Double Yellow Card/Ejection	Red Card	Points
1	(Moldova) Vadim Cemirtan	Costuleni	8	0	1	11
1	(Morocco) Adil Rhaili	Milsami Orhei	9	1	0	11
3	(Moldova) Petru Ojog	Costuleni	10	0	0	10
3	(Moldova) Victor Mudrac	Olimpia Bălți (7) & Dinamo-Auto Tiraspol (3)	10	0	0	10
4	(Moldova) Alexandru Scripcenco	Sheriff Tiraspol (4) & Costuleni (5)	3	0	2	9
4	(Moldova) Serghei Gheorghiev	Tiraspol (2) & Dinamo-Auto Tiraspol (7)	7	1	0	9
4	(Moldova) Eugen Celeadnic	Speranța Crihana Veche	9	0	0	9
4	(Moldova) Dumitru Seul	Veris Chișinău	9	0	0	9
9	(Moldova) Constantin Țurcan	Dinamo-Auto Tiraspol	3	1	1	8
9	(Moldova) Stanislav Luca	Rapid Ghidighici (4) & Costuleni (3)	8	0	0	8
9	(Moldova) Gheorghe Anton	Zimbru Chișinău	8	0	0	8
9	(Moldova) Viorel Frunză	Veris Chișinău	8	0	0	8
9	(Guinea) Ibrahima Camara	Dacia Chișinău	8	0	0	8

== Fair-Play Award ==
As of 30 May 2014

Rank	Club	Yellow card	Double Yellow Card/Ejection	Direct Red Card	Point's	Worst Disciplinary Player
1	Tiraspol	37	0	0	37	(Bulgaria) Georgi Karaneychev (6 point's)
2	Sheriff Tiraspol	44	1	1	49	(Moldova) Vadim Paireli (7 point's)
3	Veris Chișinău	58	2	0	62	(Moldova) Dumitru Seul (9 point's)
4	Olimpia Bălți	58	1	1	63	(Moldova) Victor Mudrac, (Moldova) Alexandru Grab (7 point's)
5	Milsami Orhei	56	2	3	69	(Morocco) Adil Rhaili (11 point's)
6	Dinamo-Auto Tiraspol	56	4	3	73	(Moldova) Constantin Țurcan (8 point's)
7	Zimbru Chișinău	72	1	0	74	(Moldova) Gheorghe Anton (8 point's)
8	Dacia Chișinău	74	1	1	79	(Guinea) Ibrahima Camara (8 point's)
9	Speranța Crihana Veche	73	1	2	81	(Moldova) Eugen Celeadnic (9 point's)
10	Academia Chișinău	69	2	3	82	(Moldova) Ion Burlacu (7 point's)
11	Costuleni	70	2	4	86	(Moldova) Vadim Cemirtan (11 point's)
DSQ	Rapid Ghidighici	34	1	2	42	(Moldova) Iurie Levandovschi (6 point's)

We have allocated points to each yellow (1 point), two yellow (2 points) and red card (3 points) for ranking purposes. Please note that this does not represent any official rankings.

== Attendances ==
As of 30 May 2014

Pos	Team	Total	High	Low	Average	Change
1	Zimbru Chișinău	16,350	4,500	200	2,350	n/a
2	Olimpia Bălți	13,500	2,300	300	1,300	n/a
3	Sheriff Tiraspol	11,561	1,611	150	881	n/a
4	Milsami Orhei	11,000	1,500	200	850	n/a
5	Veris Chișinău	5,950	1,000	50	525	n/a
6	Dacia Chișinău	5,500	1,000	0	500	n/a
7	Costuleni	4,950	800	100	450	n/a
8	Tiraspol	4,830	600	150	375	n/a
9	Academia Chișinău	3,000	500	50	275	n/a
10	Rapid Ghidighici	2,850	1,000	100	550	n/a
11	Speranța Crihana Veche	2,850	500	50	275	n/a
12	Dinamo-Auto Tiraspol	2,410	450	50	250	n/a
	League total	84,851	4,500	0	2,250	n/a
