= 2015–16 FC Sheriff Tiraspol season =

Sheriff Tiraspol
2015–16 season
- Chairman: Viktor Gushan
- Manager: Lilian Popescu (until 5 October); Zoran Vulić (from 7 October)
- Stadium: Sheriff Stadium
- Divizia Naţională: 1st
- Moldovan Cup: Semi-final
- Moldovan Super Cup: Winners
- Europa League: First qualifying round
- Top goalscorer: League: Danijel Subotić (12); All: Danijel Subotić (12)
Home colours	Away colours

The 2015–16 season is FC Sheriff Tiraspol's 19th season, and their 18th in the Divizia Naţională, the top-flight of Moldovan football. Sheriff Tiraspol are the current defending champions of the Moldovan Cup, and were knocked out of the Europa League by Norwegian side Odds BK, whilst defeating FC Milsami Orhei in the Moldovan Super Cup.

== Season events ==
Prior to the start of the season, 27 May 2015, Lilian Popescu was appointed as Sheriff Tiraspol's new manager.

== Squad ==
As of match played 29 May 2016

No.	Name	Nationality	Position	Date of birth (age)	Signed from	Signed in	Contract ends	Apps.	Goals
Goalkeepers
1	Bozhidar Mitrev	(Bulgaria)	GK	31 March 1987 (aged 29)	Lokomotiv Sofia	2015		7	0
25	Sergiu Juric	(Moldova)	GK	3 March 1984 (aged 32)	Veris Chișinău	2014			
28	Alexei Koșelev	(Moldova)	GK	19 November 1993 (aged 22)	Tiraspol	2015		27	0
	Denis Macogonenco	(Moldova)	GK	20 February 1996 (aged 20)	Trainee	2015		1	0
Defenders
3	Fidan Aliti	(Albania)	DF	3 October 1993 (aged 22)	Luzern	2015		11	0
4	Constantin Bogdan	(Moldova)	DF	29 December 1993 (aged 22)	Yenisey Krasnoyarsk	2016		0	0
6	Antony Golec	(Australia)	DF	29 May 1990 (aged 25)	Perth Glory	2016		13	0
15	Marcel Metoua	(Ivory Coast)	DF	15 November 1988 (aged 27)	Banat Zrenjanin	2011		141	10
17	Artiom Rozgoniuc	(Moldova)	DF	1 October 1995 (aged 20)	Trainee	2013		24	0
18	Andrei Novicov	(Moldova)	DF	24 April 1986 (aged 30)	Tiraspol	2015			
19	Serghei Svinarenco	(Moldova)	DF	18 September 1996 (aged 19)	Trainee	2014		19	0
21	Maxim Potîrniche	(Moldova)	DF	13 June 1989 (aged 26)	Zimbru Chișinău	2015		15	0
22	Amer Dupovac	(Bosnia and Herzegovina)	DF	29 May 1991 (aged 24)	Sarajevo	2015		20	1
27	Andrei Macrițchii	(Moldova)	DF	13 February 1996 (aged 20)	Trainee	2013		3	1
55	Mateo Sušić	(Bosnia and Herzegovina)	DF	18 November 1990 (aged 25)	CFR Cluj	2015		43	1
90	Vujadin Savić	(Serbia)	DF	1 July 1990 (aged 25)	Watford	2015		19	0
Midfielders
7	Jô Santos	(Brazil)	MF	31 March 1991 (aged 25)	Zimbru Chișinău	2016		7	1
8	Radu Gînsari	(Moldova)	MF	10 December 1991 (aged 24)	Zimbru Chișinău	2014		52	12
9	Bruno Pelissari	(Brazil)	MF	3 January 1993 (aged 23)	Paranaense	2016		3	0
13	Khalifa Jabbie	(Sierra Leone)	MF	20 January 1993 (aged 23)	Balıkesirspor	2015		12	0
14	Wilfried Balima	(Burkina Faso)	MF	20 March 1985 (aged 31)	US Ouagadougou	2005			
16	Vadim Paireli	(Moldova)	MF	8 November 1995 (aged 20)	Trainee	2013		66	6
24	Seidu Yahaya	(Ghana)	MF	31 December 1989 (aged 26)	Astra Giurgiu	2015		28	0
33	Valeriu Macrițchii	(Moldova)	MF	13 February 1996 (aged 20)	Trainee	2013		39	2
34	Ivan Urvanțev	(Moldova)	MF	2 May 1997 (aged 19)	Trainee	2016		4	0
35	Artur Pătraș	(Moldova)	MF	1 October 1988 (aged 27)	Milsami Orhei	2016		12	1
77	Goran Galešić	(Bosnia and Herzegovina)	MF	11 March 1989 (aged 27)	Koper	2016		12	1
Forwards
11	Josip Ivančić	(Croatia)	FW	29 March 1991 (aged 25)	HNK Rijeka	2016		14	5
26	Andrei Cobeț	(Moldova)	FW	3 January 1997 (aged 19)	Trainee	2015		0	0
29	Eugeniu Rebenja	(Moldova)	FW	5 March 1995 (aged 21)	Tiraspol	2015		19	5
31	Danijel Subotić	(Switzerland)	FW	31 January 1989 (aged 27)	Qadsia	2015		28	12
93	Maxim Iurcu	(Moldova)	FW	1 February 1993 (aged 23)	Dinamo-Auto Tiraspol	2014		28	6
Players away on loan
11	Ricardinho	(Brazil)	MF	4 September 1989 (aged 26)	Lechia Gdańsk	2013		86	38
Left during the season
4	Mihajlo Cakić	(Serbia)	MF	27 May 1990 (aged 25)	Tiraspol	2015		8	1
6	Igor Jugović	(Croatia)	MF	23 January 1989 (aged 27)	NK Celje	2015		8	0
7	Vyacheslav Sharpar	(Ukraine)	MF	2 June 1987 (aged 28)	Volyn Lutsk	2015		4	0
9	Juninho Potiguar	(Brazil)	FW	22 February 1990 (aged 26)	Icasa	2014		55	31
12	Dmitri Stajila	(Moldova)	GK	2 August 1991 (aged 24)	Trainee	2007			
20	Cadú	(Brazil)	MF	31 August 1986 (aged 29)	Red Star Belgrade	2013		79	13
23	Ernandes	(Brazil)	MF	11 November 1987 (aged 28)	Atlético Goianiense	2014		38	1
32	Igor Picușceac	(Moldova)	FW	23 March 1983 (aged 33)	Amkar Perm	2015			

=== Out on loan ===
Note: Flags indicate national team as defined under FIFA eligibility rules; some limited exceptions apply. Players may hold more than one non-FIFA nationality.

No.	Pos.	Nation	Player
11	FW	BRA	Ricardinho (at Al-Sharjah)

== Transfers ==
=== In ===
Date	Position	Nationality	Name	From	Fee	Ref.
Summer 2015	FW	(Moldova)	Eugeniu Rebenja	Tiraspol	Undisclosed	
9 June 2015	MF	(Serbia)	Mihajlo Cakić	Tiraspol	Undisclosed	
12 June 2015	MF	(Croatia)	Ivan Crnov	Zrinjski Mostar	Undisclosed	
15 June 2015	MF	(Moldova)	Andrei Novicov	Tiraspol	Undisclosed	
15 June 2015	MF	(Ghana)	Seidu Yahaya	Astra Giurgiu	Undisclosed	
18 June 2015	MF	(Ukraine)	Vyacheslav Sharpar	Volyn Lutsk	Undisclosed	
18 June 2015	GK	(Moldova)	Alexei Koșelev	Tiraspol	Undisclosed	
25 June 2015	MF	(Croatia)	Igor Jugović	NK Celje	Undisclosed	
30 June 2015	GK	(Bulgaria)	Bozhidar Mitrev	Lokomotiv Sofia	Undisclosed	
10 July 2015	FW	(Moldova)	Igor Picușceac	Amkar Perm	Undisclosed	
23 July 2015	FW	(Switzerland)	Danijel Subotić	Qadsia	Undisclosed	
6 August 2015	MF	(Sierra Leone)	Khalifa Jabbie	Balıkesirspor	Undisclosed	
6 August 2015	DF	(Serbia)	Vujadin Savić	Watford	Undisclosed	
3 September 2015	DF	(Albania)	Fidan Aliti	Academia Chișinău	Undisclosed	
12 January 2016	MF	(Croatia)	Josip Ivančić	HNK Rijeka	Undisclosed	
12 January 2016	MF	(Moldova)	Artur Pătraș	Milsami Orhei	Undisclosed	
13 January 2016	MF	(Brazil)	Jô Santos	Zimbru Chișinău	Undisclosed	
14 January 2016	DF	(Australia)	Antony Golec	Perth Glory	Undisclosed	
15 January 2016	MF	(Bosnia and Herzegovina)	Goran Galešić	Koper	Undisclosed	
3 February 2016	GK	(Moldova)	Sergiu Juric	Zaria Bălți	Undisclosed	
5 February 2016	DF	(Moldova)	Constantin Bogdan	Yenisey Krasnoyarsk	Undisclosed	
1 March 2016	MF	(Brazil)	Bruno Pelissari	Athletico Paranaense	Undisclosed	

=== Out ===
Date	Position	Nationality	Name	To	Fee	Ref.
25 January 2016	FW	(Brazil)	Juninho Potiguar	Al Shabab	Undisclosed	

=== Loans in ===
Date from	Position	Nationality	Name	From	Date to	Ref.
Summer 2015	MF	(Croatia)	Igor Jugović	NK Celje	12 January 2016	

=== Loans out ===
Date from	Position	Nationality	Name	To	Date to	Ref.
17 February 2015	GK	(Moldova)	Dmitri Stajila	Kukësi	17 August 2015	
1 July 2015	FW	(Moldova)	Artiom Puntus	Saxan	End of Season	
21 January 2016	MF	(Brazil)	Ricardinho	Al-Sharjah	5 July 2016	

=== Released ===
Date	Position	Nationality	Name	Joined	Date
9 June 2015	MF	(Spain)	Aitor Monroy	Maccabi Petah Tikva	
18 June 2015	GK	(Moldova)	Serghei Pașcenco	Malavan	
1 July 2015	GK	(Argentina)	Matías Degra	AEL Limassol	
1 July 2015	GK	(Moldova)	Sergiu Juric	Zaria Bălți	
1 July 2015	MF	(Brazil)	Leonel Olímpio	Toledo	
1 July 2015	MF	(Moldova)	Maxim Antoniuc	Buxoro	
10 July 2015	FW	(Bulgaria)	Ismail Isa	Beroe Stara Zagora	
4 August 2015	MF	(Croatia)	Ivan Crnov	Široki Brijeg	
13 August 2015	MF	(Ukraine)	Vyacheslav Sharpar	Volyn Lutsk	
17 August 2015	MF	(Brazil)	Ernandes	Ceará	
3 September 2015	FW	(Moldova)	Igor Picușceac	Academia Chișinău	
Summer 2015	DF	(Romania)	Andrei Mureșan	CFR Cluj	
Summer 2015	MF	(Brazil)	Thiago Galvão	Čukarički	
5 December 2015	MF	(Serbia)	Mihajlo Cakić	Zemun	
25 January 2016	GK	(Moldova)	Dmitri Stajila	Kuban Krasnodar	
21 March 2016	MF	(Brazil)	Cadú	Akhaa Ahli	
31 May 2016	DF	(Moldova)	Andrei Novicov	Zaria Bălți	

== Friendlies ==
8 February 2016	Kuban Krasnodar (Russia)	1–2	(Moldova) Sheriff Tiraspol	Larnaca, Cyprus
EET (UTC+2)	Armaș	Report	Joálisson; Balima

11 February 2016	Tom Tomsk (Russia)	2–3	(Moldova) Sheriff Tiraspol	Larnaca, Cyprus
18:00 EET (UTC+2)	Nyakhaychyk 17'; Pugin 26'	Report	Joálisson 29' (pen.); Balima 50'; Galešić 64'

14 February 2016	Dnipro Cherkasy (Ukraine)	0–2	(Moldova) Sheriff Tiraspol	Larnaca, Cyprus
EET (UTC+2)		Report	Cadú 32'; Dupovac

17 February 2016	Ural (Russia)	1–0	(Moldova) Sheriff Tiraspol	Larnaca, Cyprus
EET (UTC+2)	Goal	Report

22 February 2016	Spartak Moscow (Russia)	3–3	(Moldova) Sheriff Tiraspol	Larnaca, Cyprus
17:00 EET (UTC+2)	Kutepov 20'; Promes 24'; Melgarejo 60'	Report	Subotić 25'; Ivančić 54'; Gînsari 63'

23 February 2016	Aris Limassol (Russia)	1–8	(Moldova) Sheriff Tiraspol	Larnaca, Cyprus
EET (UTC+2)	Goal	Report	Joálisson; Subotić; Iurcu; I.Urvantsev; Paireli; Jabbie

== Competitions ==
=== Moldovan Super Cup ===
25 June 2015	Milsami Orhei	1–3	Sheriff Tiraspol	Tiraspol
20:00 EEST (UTC+3)	Bud 22' (pen.); Monday (yellow card) 23'; Cojocari (yellow card) 58'	Report	Potiguar 4'; A.Macrițchii 9'; Cadú 34'	Stadium: Sheriff Stadium; Attendance: 5,000; Referee: Piotr Stoianov

=== Divizia Națională ===
==== Results summary ====
Overall								Home						Away					
Pld	W	D	L	GF	GA	GD	Pts	W	D	L	GF	GA	GD	W	D	L	GF	GA	GD
27	20	5	2	50	11	+39	65	12	2	0	31	4	+27	8	3	2	19	7	+12

Last updated: 31 May 2016.
Source: Soccerway

==== Results ====
25 July 2015 1	Sheriff Tiraspol	2–0	Saxan Gagauz Yeri	Tiraspol
19:00 EEST (UTC+3)	Cakić 54'; Ricardinho (yellow card) 89' (goal) 90'	Report		Stadium: Sheriff Stadium; Attendance: 2,000; Referee: Alexandr Tean

1 August 2015 2	Sheriff Tiraspol	4–0	Petrocub Hîncești	Tiraspol
19:00 EEST (UTC+3)	Picușceac 33'; Novicov (yellow card) 39' (goal) 51'; Ricardinho 52'; Iurcu 75'	Report		Stadium: Sheriff Stadium; Attendance: 2,000; Referee: Andrei Ceban

9 August 2015 3	Speranța Nisporeni	1–0	Sheriff Tiraspol	Nisporeni
18:00 EEST (UTC+3)	Șeroni (yellow card) 49'; Onicaș 79'; N.Țurcan (yellow card) 83'	Report		Stadium: Stadionul Orășenesc; Attendance: 1,000; Referee: Petru Stoianov

15 August 2015 4	Academia Chișinău	0–3	Sheriff Tiraspol	Ghidighici
17:30 EEST (UTC+3)	Boghiu (yellow card) 45+2'; Popescu (yellow card) 85'	Report	Cojocari 21', 81' (o.g.); Cadú 30'	Stadium: Ghidighici Stadium; Attendance: 300; Referee: Vladislav Ivancenco

22 August 2015 5	Sheriff Tiraspol	3–0	Milsami Orhei	Tiraspol
19:00 EEST (UTC+3)	Subotić (yellow card) 10' (goal) 56'; Ricardinho 27', 45+1'; Sušić (yellow card) 43'	Report	Rhaili (yellow card) 29'; Cojocari (yellow card) 75'	Stadium: Sheriff Stadium; Attendance: 4,500; Referee: Viorel Găina

29 August 2015 6	Zimbru Chișinău	1–2	Sheriff Tiraspol	Chișinău
20:00 EEST (UTC+3)	Amani (yellow card) 35' (yellow-red card) 45'; Rui Miguel 61' (pen.); Burghiu (yellow card) 90+4'	Report	Ricardinho 27' (yellow card) 82'; Subotić 58'; Gînsari (yellow card) 60'; Yahaya (yellow card) 71'; Sušić (yellow card) 73'	Stadium: Zimbru Stadium; Attendance: 4,000; Referee: Serghei Derenov

13 September 2015 7	Sheriff Tiraspol	1–1	Dinamo-Auto Tiraspol	Tiraspol
18:00 EEST (UTC+3)	Iurcu 62'; Yahaya (red card) 73'	Report	Ilescu (yellow card) 17'; Cemîrtan (yellow card) 17'; A.Tofan (yellow card) 28'; D.Voloşin (yellow card) 40'; S.Ivanov (yellow card) 45'; Bugneac 78'	Stadium: Sheriff Stadium; Attendance: 2,000; Referee: Iurie Rochin

19 September 2015 8	Zaria Bălți	1–1	Sheriff Tiraspol	Bălți
16:00 EEST (UTC+3)	L.Dao (yellow card) 22'; Boghiu 63' (pen.); V.Rassulov (yellow card) 72'	Report	Novicov (yellow card) 17'; Aliti (yellow card) 63'; Mitrev (yellow card) 65'; Savić 71'	Stadium: Stadionul Orășenesc; Attendance: 4,000; Referee: Gheorghe Malinovschii

26 September 2015 9	Sheriff Tiraspol	0–0	Dacia Chișinău	Tiraspol
18:00 EEST (UTC+3)	Subotić (yellow card) 35'; Ricardinho (yellow card) 80'	Report	A.Bursuc (yellow card) 14'	Stadium: Sheriff Stadium; Attendance: 3,000; Referee: Viorel Găina

2 October 2015 10	Saxan Gagauz Yeri	1–2	Sheriff Tiraspol	Ceadîr-Lunga
15:00 EEST (UTC+3)	C.Calmîș (yellow card) 50'; S.Istrati 88'	Report	Subotić 13'; A.Çağrıhan 75' (o.g.)	Stadium: Ceadîr-Lunga Stadium; Attendance: 1,500; Referee: Andrei Ceban

18 October 2015 11	Petrocub Hîncești	0–3	Sheriff Tiraspol	Hîncești
15:00 EEST (UTC+3)	Șumchin (yellow card) 50'	Report	Sušić 20'; Subotić 33'; Ricardinho 68'; Gînsari (yellow card) 71'	Stadium: Stadionul Orășenesc; Attendance: 950; Referee: Alexandr Tean

23 October 2015 12	Sheriff Tiraspol	2–1	Speranța Nisporeni	Tiraspol
18:00 EEST (UTC+3)	Subotić 12', 80'; Gînsari (yellow card) 48'; Ricardinho (yellow card) 90'; A.Rozgoniuc (yellow card) 90+3'	Report	Maxim 65'	Stadium: Sheriff Stadium; Attendance: 2,000; Referee: Gabriel Tupicico

31 October 2015 13	Sheriff Tiraspol	3–1	Academia Chișinău	Tiraspol
17:00 EET (UTC+2)	Subotić 39' (pen.); Potiguar 46'; Radu Gînsari 50'; Balima (yellow card) 62'	Report	Tiron 36'; Bogdan (yellow card) 38'; Roșca (yellow card) 62'	Stadium: Sheriff Stadium; Attendance: 1,300; Referee: Andrei Ceban

8 November 2015 14	Milsami Orhei	0–1	Sheriff Tiraspol	Orhei
14:00 EET (UTC+2)	Dulghier (yellow card) 38'; Cojocari (yellow card) 82'; Pătraș (yellow card) 90+1'	Report	Savić (yellow card) 21'; Potiguar 90+1'; Ricardinho (yellow card) 90+1'	Stadium: CSR Orhei; Attendance: 1,000; Referee: Viorel Găina

22 November 2015 15	Sheriff Tiraspol	4–1	Zimbru Chișinău	Tiraspol
15:00 EET (UTC+2)	Novicov 32'; Subotić (yellow card) 48' (goal) 79'; S.Svinarenko (yellow card) 67'; Potiguar 77'; Jardan 82' (o.g.)	Report	Anton (yellow card) 14'; Amani 34'; Bruno (yellow card) 49'; Belevschi (yellow card) 55'; Vremea (yellow card) 65'	Stadium: Sheriff Stadium; Attendance: 3,500; Referee: Gabriel Tupicico

28 November 2015 16	Dinamo-Auto Tiraspol	0–0	Sheriff Tiraspol	Tîrnauca
13:00 EET (UTC+2)	Cemîrtan (yellow card) 18'; C.Mandrîcenco (yellow card) 34'; S.Diulgher (yellow card) 37' (yellow-red card) 53'; Celeadnic (yellow card) 90+3'; Casian (yellow card) 90+3'	Report	Yahaya (yellow card) 28'; A.Dupovac (yellow card) 47'; Subotić (yellow card) 60'	Stadium: Dinamo-Auto Stadium; Attendance: 500; Referee: Alexander Tean

5 March 2016 17	Sheriff Tiraspol	1–0	Zaria Bălți	Tiraspol
17:00 EET (UTC+2)	Savić (yellow card) 54'; Pătraș 60'; A.Rozgoniuc (yellow card) 64'; Ivančić (yellow card) 66'; Balima (yellow card) 71'	Report	O.Ermachenko (yellow card) 40'; Țîgîrlaș (yellow card) 64'	Stadium: Sheriff Stadium; Attendance: 1,560; Referee: Alexandr Tean

12 March 2016 18	Dacia Chișinău	1–0	Sheriff Tiraspol	Speia
14:00 EET (UTC+2)	Feshchuk 79'; Bordian (yellow card) 88'; Posmac (yellow card) 90+5'	Report	A.Rozgoniuc (yellow card) 14'; Sušić (yellow card) 67'; Balima (yellow card) 69'	Stadium: Stadionul Moldova; Attendance: 650; Referee: Ivan Kružliak

18 March 2016 19	Sheriff Tiraspol	2–0	Academia Chișinău	Tiraspol
15:00 EET (UTC+2)	Golec (yellow card) 60'; Balima 78'; Ivančić 90+4'	Report	Vremea (yellow card) 28'; Celeadnic (yellow card) 66'; Matei (yellow card) 75'	Stadium: Sheriff Stadium; Attendance: 1,100; Referee: Vladislav Ivancenco

2 April 2016 20	Petrocub Hîncești	0–1	Sheriff Tiraspol	Hîncești
15:00 EEST (UTC+3)	A.Rusu (yellow card) 77'; V.Osipenco (yellow card) 90'	Report	Subotić 26' (pen.); Galešić (yellow card) 40'; Jabbie (yellow card) 45'	Stadium: Stadionul Orășenesc; Attendance: 1,000; Referee: Iurie Rochin

9 April 2016 21	Sheriff Tiraspol	2–0	Milsami Orhei	Tiraspol
18:00 EEST (UTC+3)	Rakhmanaw 6' (o.g.); Gînsari (yellow card) 77'; Balima 83'	Report	Monday (yellow card) 30'; Sidorenco (yellow card) 43'; Rhaili (yellow card) 51'; Bolohan (yellow card) 63'	Stadium: Sheriff Stadium; Attendance: 2,500; Referee: Petru Stoianov

15 April 2016 22	Sheriff Tiraspol	2–0	Zimbru Chișinău	Tiraspol
18:00 EEST (UTC+3)	Jabbie (yellow card) 10'; Galešić (yellow card) 25'; Joálisson 35'; Ivančić 90+4'	Report	Miguel (yellow card) 21'; Anton (yellow card) 24'; Hélio (yellow card) 25'	Stadium: Sheriff Stadium; Attendance: 2,000; Referee: Viorel Găina

23 April 2016 23	Speranța Nisporeni	1–4	Sheriff Tiraspol	Nisporeni
16:00 EEST (UTC+3)	A.Ciofu (yellow card) 42'; N.Țivirenco (yellow card) 71'; Milinceanu 90'	Report	Gînsari 9'; Novicov (yellow card) 45'; Subotić 61'; Ivančić 69'; Rebenja 86'	Stadium: Stadionul Orășenesc; Attendance: 450; Referee: Vladislav Ivancenco

29 April 2016 24	Sheriff Tiraspol	3–0	Zaria Bălți	Tiraspol
18:00 EEST (UTC+3)	Subotić 42'; Balima 52'; A.Rozgoniuc (yellow card) 88'; Gînsari 90+1'	Report	Deen-Conteh (yellow card) 19'; L.Dao (yellow card) 68'	Stadium: Sheriff Stadium; Attendance: 1,300; Referee: Iurie Rochin

6 May 2016 25	Dinamo-Auto Tiraspol	0–1	Sheriff Tiraspol	Tîrnauca
17:00 EEST (UTC+3)	Truhanov (yellow card) 63'; Mudrac (yellow card) 82'	Report	Subotić 22'	Stadium: Dinamo-Auto Stadium; Attendance: 1,000; Referee: Petru Stoianov

15 May 2016 26	Sheriff Tiraspol	2–0	Saxan Gagauz Yeri	Tiraspol
18:00 EEST (UTC+3)	Rebenja 24'; Savić (yellow card) 44'; Gînsari 60'; Yahaya (yellow card) 67'	Report	S.Inoua (yellow card) 20'; I.Carandașov (yellow card) 73'	Stadium: Malaya Arena; Attendance: 1,500; Referee: Gabriel Tupicico

20 May 2016 27	Dacia Chișinău	1–1	Sheriff Tiraspol	Speia
18:00 EEST (UTC+3)	Feshchuk 45+1'	Report	Yahaya (yellow card) 11'; Ivančić 75'	Stadium: Stadionul Moldova; Attendance: 3,000; Referee: Petru Stoianov

==== Golden Match ====
29 May 2016	Sheriff Tiraspol	1–0	Dacia Chișinău	Chișinău
20:00 EEST (UTC+3)	Subotić (yellow card) 59'; Galešić 88' (yellow card) 88'; Ivančić (yellow card) 90'	Report	Bejan (yellow card) 63'	Stadium: Zimbru Stadium; Attendance: 6,500

==== League table ====
Pos	Team	Pld	W	D	L	GF	GA	GD	Pts	Qualification
1	Sheriff Tiraspol (C)	27	20	5	2	50	11	+39	65 (Note: According to section 10.5 of the Moldovan Football Championship Regulations, 2015-2016 Edition, an extra match was played to determine the Moldovan champions. The match was played on 29 May 2016 and was won by Sheriff Tiraspol who became league champions.)	Qualification for the Champions League second qualifying round
2	Dacia Chișinău	27	20	5	2	44	12	+32	65	Qualification for the Europa League first qualifying round (Note: Zaria Bălți qualified for the Europa League first qualifying round by winning the 2015–16 Moldovan Cup)
3	Zimbru Chișinău	27	15	4	8	42	26	+16	49	Qualification for the Europa League first qualifying round
4	Zaria Bălți	27	12	6	9	36	29	+7	42	Qualification for the Europa League first qualifying round
5	Dinamo-Auto Tiraspol	27	12	5	10	33	34	−1	41	

Source: Moldovan Football Federation, UEFA, Soccerway
Rules for classification: 1) Points; 2) Play-off (only if deciding champion when two teams tied); 3) Head-to-head points; 4) Head-to-head goal difference; 5) Head-to-head away goals scored; 6) Head-to-head goals scored; 7) Goal difference; 8) Goals scored; 9) Fairplay ranking.
(C) Champions

=== Moldovan Cup ===
27 October 2015 Last 16	Sheriff Tiraspol	8–1	Intersport-Aroma	Tiraspol
17:00 EET (UTC+2)	Potiguar 3', 21', 28', 58'; Rebenja 32', 63'; Iurcu 37'; A.Dupovac (yellow card) 74'; Cobeț 83' (yellow card) 84'	Report	Guja 38'; R.Haryana (yellow card) 57'	Stadium: Sheriff Stadium; Referee: Ruslan Muntean

19 April 2016 Quarterfinal	Sheriff Tiraspol	1–0	Academia Chișinău	Tiraspol
18:00 EEST (UTC+3)	Ivančić 5'; Novicov (yellow card) 45+1'; Golec (yellow card) 54'	Report	Jardan (yellow card) 87'	Stadium: Sheriff Stadium; Attendance: 2,000

10 May 2016 Semifinal	Sheriff Tiraspol	1–2 (a.e.t.)	Zaria Bălți	Tiraspol
18:00 EEST (UTC+3)	Yahaya (yellow card) 22'; Gînsari 90+5'	Report	M.Koné (yellow card) 1'; Slinkin 63'; Boghiu 108'; Livșiț (yellow card) 120'	Stadium: Sheriff Stadium; Attendance: 1,000; Referee: Viorel Găina

=== UEFA Europa League ===
==== Qualifying rounds ====
2 July 2015 First Qualifying Round 1st leg	Sheriff Tiraspol (Moldova)	1–3	(Norway) Odd	Tiraspol, Moldova
20:00 EEST (UTC+3)	Cadú (yellow card) 84'; Yahaya (yellow card) 90+3'	Report	Bentley 2' (yellow card) 67'; Johnsen 11'; Hagen 28'; Halvorsen (yellow card) 69'; Berg (yellow card) 74'	Stadium: Sheriff Stadium; Attendance: 6,628; Referee: Tsvetan Krastev (Bulgaria)

9 July 2015 First Qualifying Round 2nd leg	Odd (Norway)	0–3 (3–4 agg.)	(Moldova) Sheriff Tiraspol	Skien, Norway
20:00 EEST (UTC+3)	Ruud (yellow card) 52'	Report	Potiguar (yellow card) 41'; V.Macrițchii (yellow card) 58'	Stadium: Skagerak Arena; Attendance: 3,981; Referee: Dejan Jakimovski (Republic of Macedonia)

== Squad statistics ==
As of Match played 29 May 2016

=== Appearances and goals ===
No.	Pos	Nat	Player	Total		Divizia Națională		Moldovan Cup		Moldovan Super Cup		Europa League	
No.	Pos	Nat	Player	Apps	Goals	Apps	Goals	Apps	Goals	Apps	Goals	Apps	Goals
1	GK	(Bulgaria) BUL	Bozhidar Mitrev	7	0	3	0	2	0	0	0	2	0
3	DF	(Albania) ALB	Fidan Aliti	11	0	4+5	0	2	0	0	0	0	0
6	DF	(Australia) AUS	Antony Golec	13	0	10+1	0	2	0	0	0	0	0
7	MF	(Brazil) BRA	Jô Santos	7	1	3+3	1	1	0	0	0	0	0
8	MF	(Moldova) MDA	Radu Gînsari	29	5	25+1	4	2	1	0	0	0+1	0
9	MF	(Brazil) BRA	Bruno Pelissari	3	0	0+3	0	0	0	0	0	0	0
10	MF	(Croatia) CRO	Ivan Crnov	2	0	0	0	0	0	0+1	0	0+1	0
11	FW	(Croatia) CRO	Josip Ivančić	14	5	5+7	4	2	1	0	0	0	0
13	MF	(Sierra Leone) SLE	Khalifa Jabbie	12	0	6+4	0	1+1	0	0	0	0	0
14	DF	(Burkina Faso) BFA	Wilfried Balima	24	3	15+7	3	0+1	0	0	0	0+1	0
15	DF	(Ivory Coast) CIV	Marcel Metoua	8	0	3+1	0	2	0	1	0	1	0
16	FW	(Moldova) MDA	Vadim Paireli	5	0	1+4	0	0	0	0	0	0	0
17	DF	(Moldova) MDA	Artiom Rozgoniuc	21	0	15+4	0	2	0	0	0	0	0
18	DF	(Moldova) MDA	Andrei Novicov	22	3	16	3	3	0	1	0	1+1	0
19	DF	(Moldova) MDA	Serghei Svinarenco	16	0	8+7	0	0	0	0+1	0	0	0
21	DF	(Moldova) MDA	Maxim Potîrniche	15	0	10+2	0	0	0	1	0	2	0
22	DF	(Bosnia and Herzegovina) BIH	Amer Dupovac	9	0	4+3	0	1	0	0	0	1	0
24	MF	(Ghana) GHA	Seidu Yahaya	28	0	22+1	0	1+1	0	1	0	2	0
25	GK	(Moldova) MDA	Denis Macogonenco	1	0	0+1	0	0	0	0	0	0	0
26	FW	(Moldova) MDA	Andrei Cobeț	1	1	0	0	0+1	1	0	0	0	0
27	DF	(Moldova) MDA	Andrei Macrițchii	2	1	0	0	0	0	1	1	0+1	0
28	GK	(Moldova) MDA	Alexei Coșelev	27	0	25	0	1	0	1	0	0	0
29	FW	(Moldova) MDA	Eugeniu Rebenja	11	4	4+5	2	1+1	2	0	0	0	0
31	FW	(Switzerland) SUI	Danijel Subotić	28	12	24+2	12	1+1	0	0	0	0	0
32	MF	(Moldova) MDA	Evgheni Oancea	1	0	0	0	0+1	0	0	0	0	0
33	MF	(Moldova) MDA	Valeriu Macrițchii	4	0	2	0	0	0	0+1	0	1	0
34	FW	(Moldova) MDA	Ivan Urvanțev	4	0	0+4	0	0	0	0	0	0	0
35	MF	(Moldova) MDA	Artur Pătraș	12	1	3+7	1	2	0	0	0	0	0
55	DF	(Bosnia and Herzegovina) BIH	Mateo Sušić	30	1	25	1	1+1	0	1	0	2	0
77	MF	(Bosnia and Herzegovina) BIH	Goran Galešić	12	1	9+1	1	2	0	0	0	0	0
90	DF	(Serbia) SRB	Vujadin Savić	19	0	17+1	0	0+1	0	0	0	0	0
93	FW	(Moldova) MDA	Maxim Iurcu	17	3	3+12	2	1+1	1	0	0	0	0
Players who left Sheriff Tiraspol during the season:
11	MF	(Brazil) BRA	Ricardinho	17	6	13	6	1	0	1	0	2	0
Players who appeared for Sheriff Tiraspol no longer at the club:
4	MF	(Serbia) SRB	Mihajlo Cakić	8	1	7	1	0	0	0	0	1	0
6	MF	(Croatia) CRO	Igor Jugović	8	0	0+5	0	1	0	1	0	1	0
7	MF	(Ukraine) UKR	Vyacheslav Sharpar	4	0	1	0	0	0	0+1	0	1+1	0
9	FW	(Brazil) BRA	Juninho Potiguar	11	8	4+3	3	1	4	1	1	2	0
20	MF	(Brazil) BRA	Cadú	20	2	17+1	1	0	0	1	1	1	0
23	MF	(Brazil) BRA	Ernandes	3	0	1	0	0	0	0	0	2	0
32	FW	(Moldova) MDA	Igor Picușceac	6	1	2+4	1	0	0	0	0	0	0

=== Goal scorers ===
Place	Position	Nation	Number	Name	Divizia Națională	Moldovan Cup	Moldovan Super Cup	Europa League	Total
1	FW	(Switzerland)	31	Danijel Subotić	12	0	0	0	12
2	FW	(Brazil)	9	Juninho Potiguar	3	4	1	0	8
3	FW	(Brazil)	11	Ricardinho	6	0	0	0	6
4	MF	(Moldova)	8	Radu Gînsari	4	1	0	0	5
4	FW	(Croatia)	11	Josip Ivančić	4	1	0	0	5
4				Own goal	5	0	0	0	5
7	FW	(Moldova)	29	Eugeniu Rebenja	2	2	0	0	4
8	DF	(Moldova)	18	Andrei Novicov	3	0	0	0	3
8	DF	(Burkina Faso)	14	Wilfried Balima	3	0	0	0	3
10	FW	(Moldova)	93	Maxim Iurcu	2	0	0	0	2
10	MF	(Brazil)	20	Cadú	1	0	1	0	2
12	MF	(Serbia)	4	Mihajlo Cakić	1	0	0	0	1
12	FW	(Moldova)	32	Igor Picușceac	1	0	0	0	1
12	MF	(Bosnia and Herzegovina)	55	Mateo Sušić	1	0	0	0	1
12	MF	(Moldova)	35	Artur Pătraș	1	0	0	0	1
12	MF	(Brazil)	7	Jô Santos	1	0	0	0	1
12	MF	(Bosnia and Herzegovina)	77	Goran Galešić	1	0	0	0	1
12	FW	(Moldova)	93	Maxim Iurcu	0	1	0	0	1
12	FW	(Moldova)	26	Andrei Cobeț	0	1	0	0	1
12	DF	(Moldova)	27	Andrei Macrițchii	0	0	1	0	1
				TOTALS	51	10	3	0	64

=== Disciplinary record ===
Number	Nation	Position	Name	Divizia Națională		Moldovan Cup		Moldovan Super Cup		Europa League		Total	
Number	Nation	Position	Name	Yellow card	Red card	Yellow card	Red card	Yellow card	Red card	Yellow card	Red card	Yellow card	Red card
1	(Bulgaria)	GK	Bozhidar Mitrev	1	0	0	0	0	0	0	0	1	0
3	(Albania)	DF	Fidan Aliti	1	0	0	0	0	0	0	0	1	0
6	(Australia)	DF	Antony Golec	1	0	1	0	0	0	0	0	2	0
8	(Moldova)	MF	Radu Gînsari	4	0	0	0	0	0	0	0	4	0
9	(Brazil)	FW	Juninho Potiguar	0	0	0	0	0	0	1	0	1	0
11	(Brazil)	FW	Ricardinho	5	0	0	0	0	0	0	0	5	0
11	(Croatia)	FW	Josip Ivančić	2	0	0	0	0	0	0	0	2	0
13	(Sierra Leone)	FW	Khalifa Jabbie	2	0	0	0	0	0	0	0	2	0
14	(Burkina Faso)	DF	Wilfried Balima	3	0	0	0	0	0	0	0	3	0
17	(Moldova)	DF	Artiom Rozgoniuc	4	0	0	0	0	0	0	0	4	0
18	(Moldova)	DF	Andrei Novicov	3	0	1	0	0	0	0	0	4	0
19	(Moldova)	DF	Serghei Svinarenko	1	0	0	0	0	0	0	0	1	0
20	(Brazil)	MF	Cadú	0	0	0	0	0	0	1	0	1	0
22	(Bosnia and Herzegovina)	DF	Amer Dupovac	1	0	1	0	0	0	0	0	2	0
24	(Ghana)	MF	Seidu Yahaya	4	1	1	0	0	0	1	0	6	1
26	(Moldova)	FW	Andrei Cobeț	0	0	1	0	0	0	0	0	1	0
31	(Switzerland)	FW	Danijel Subotić	6	0	0	0	0	0	0	0	6	0
33	(Moldova)	MF	Valeriu Macrițchii	0	0	0	0	0	0	1	0	1	0
55	(Bosnia and Herzegovina)	DF	Mateo Sušić	3	0	0	0	0	0	0	0	3	0
77	(Bosnia and Herzegovina)	MF	Goran Galešić	3	0	1	0	0	0	0	0	4	0
90	(Serbia)	DF	Vujadin Savić	3	0	0	0	0	0	0	0	3	0
			TOTALS	47	1	5	0	0	0	4	0	56	1
