= 2012–13 Moldovan Cup =

Cupa Moldovei
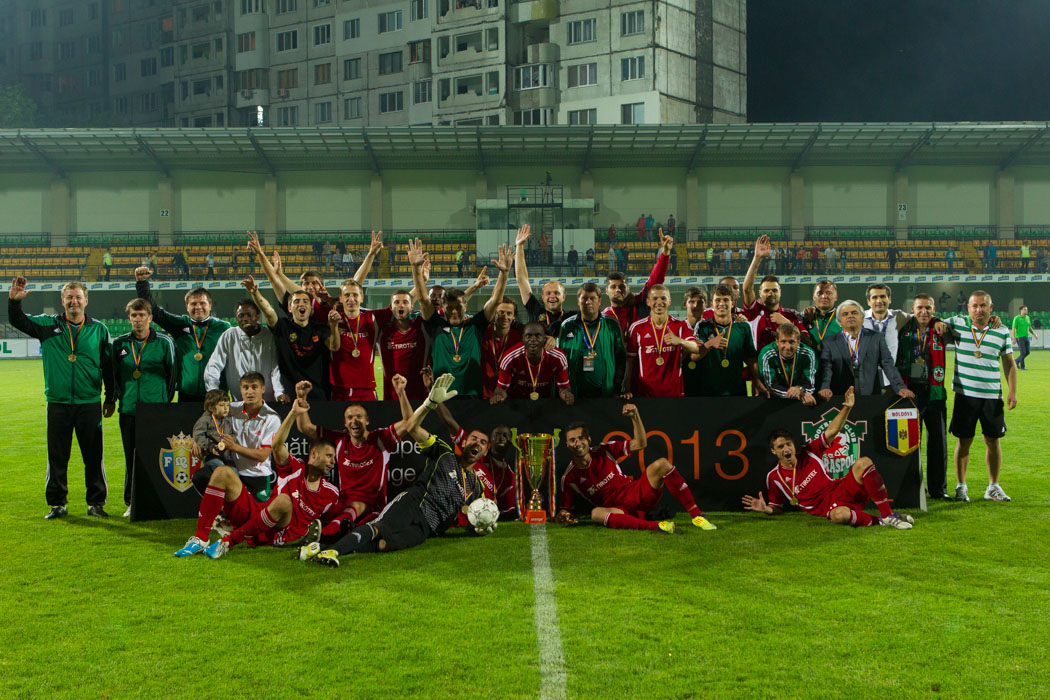
- FC Tiraspol as winners of the Moldovan Cup

Tournament details
- Country: Moldova
- Teams: 50

Final positions
- Champions: FC Tiraspol
- Runners-up: Veris Drăgăneşti

The 2012–13 Moldovan Cup is the 22nd season of the Moldovan annual football tournament. The competition began on 25 August 2012 with the First Preliminary Round and will end with the final held in May 2012. The winner of the competition will qualify for the first qualifying round of the 2012–13 UEFA Europa League.

== First Preliminary Round ==
Entering this round are 30 clubs from the Moldovan "B" Division. These matches took place on 14 September 2011.

Team 1	Score	Team 2
CF Rîcani	5–1	CS Drochia
FC Floreşti	0–1	FC Dava Soroca
FC Teleneşti	4–0	FC Flacăra
ABUS Ungheni	2–1	FC Codru Junior
FC Sîngerei	4–1	FC Glodeni
SS-2 Narubai	4–3	CSF Cricova
Codru Călăraşi	3–1	Universitatea Agrara
FC Cimişlia	1–2	FC Viişoara
Cahul-2005	2–1	FC Prut
FC Kolos	1–5	FC Slobozia Mare
FC Congaz	3–1	FC Trachia
FC Olan	0–2	Sinteza Căușeni
Sparta Selemet	3–0	FC Univer

== Second Preliminary Round ==
The 13 winners from the previous round and 1 club from the Moldovan "B" Division entered this stage of the competition. These matches took place on 1 September 2012.

Team 1	Score	Team 2
ABUS Ungheni	4–1	FC Teleneşti
SS-2 Narubai	0–3	FC Sîngerei
Sparta Selemet	3–0	FC Viişoara
Cahul-2005	6–0	FC Congaz
Codru Călăraşi	1–0	Sinteza Căușeni

== First round ==
In this round enter teams from "A" Division. They will play against 8 winner teams from the second preliminary round. These matches took place on 8 September 2012.

Team 1	Score	Team 2
Sîngerei	0–3	Veris Drăgăneşti
Codru Călărași	0–1	Victoria Bardar
Tighina	0–3	Dinamo-Auto Tiraspol
Rîșcani	3–1	Edineț
Dava Soroca	2–3	Locomotiv Bălți
ABUS Ungheni	0–0 (a.e.t.); 1–3 (pen.)	Sfîntul Gheorghe
Sparta Selemet	4–0	Găgăuzia
Cahul-2005	3–0	Maiak Chirsova
Slobozia Mare	0–4	Saxan
Real Succes	2–3	Intersport-Aroma

== Second round ==
In this round enter 4 teams from National Division. These matches were played on 26 September 2012.

Team 1	Score	Team 2
Dinamo-Auto Tiraspol	3–2	Academia Chișinău
Speranța Crihana Veche	3–1	Rîșcani
Sfîntul Gheorghe	1–2	Locomotiv Bălți
Saxan	1–3	Costuleni
Cahul-2005	4–0	Sparta Selemet
Rapid Ghidighici	3–0	Intersport-Aroma

== Third round ==
In this round entered the five winners from the previous round, the three winners from first round and the remaining eight teams from the National Division. These matches were played on 31 October 2012.

31 October 2012	Dinamo-Auto Tiraspol	1–3	Milsami Orhei	Stadion Tiligul (Ternovca), Tiraspol
13:00		Report

31 October 2012	Iskra-Stal Rîbnița	3–3 (a.e.t.) (4–2 p)	Speranța Crihana Veche	Stadionul CPSM, Vadul lui Vodă
13:00		Report

30 October 2012	Locomotiv Bălți	1–5	Dacia Chișinău	Teren ŞSSF Bălți, Bălți
13:00		Report

31 October 2012	Olimpia Bălți	0–0 (a.e.t.) (3–4 p)	Veris Drăgăneşti	Olimpia Bălți Stadium, Bălți
13:00		Report

31 October 2012	Victoria Bardar	0–4	FC Tiraspol	Stadionul Buiucani, Chișinău
13:00		Report

31 October 2012	Zimbru Chișinău	3–0	Cahul-2005	Zimbru Stadium, Chișinău
13:00		Report

31 October 2012	Nistru Otaci	1–0	Costuleni	Călărăşăuca Stadium, Otaci
13:00		Report

31 October 2012	Rapid Ghidighici	0–1 (a.e.t.)	Sheriff Tiraspol	Stadionul Sătesc, Ghidighici
13:00		Report

== Quarter-finals ==
This round featured the eight winners from the previous round. The matches were played on 16–17 April 2013.

16 April 2013	Dacia Chișinău	0–1	Veris Drăgăneşti	Zimbru, Chișinău
14:00		Report	Hovanschi 3'

16 April 2013	Iskra-Stal Rîbnița	0–1	Milsami Orhei	Gorodskoi Stadium, Rîbnița
15:00		Report	Guilherme 37'

16 April 2013	Sheriff Tiraspol	7–0	Nistru Otaci	Sheriff, Tiraspol
17:00	Markovski 29', 33', 65'; Luvannor 35'; Gheorghiev 44'; Marjanović 81'; Pešić 90+2'	Report

17 April 2013	FC Tiraspol	2–0	Zimbru Chișinău	Sheriff, Tiraspol
17:00	Karaneychev 57'; Zarichnyuk 73'	Report

== Semi-finals ==
This round featured the four winners from the previous round. The matches were played on 7 May 2013.

7 May 2013	FC Tiraspol	2–1 (a.e.t.)	Sheriff Tiraspol	Sheriff, Tiraspol
18:00	Alexandru Popovici 5'; Bogdan Hauşi 98'	Report	Wilfried Balima 64'	Attendance: 600; Referee: Vladislav Ivancenco

7 May 2013	Veris Drăgăneşti	0–0 (a.e.t.) (2–1 p)	Milsami Orhei	Zimbru, Chișinău
17:00		Report		Attendance: 2,000; Referee: Petru Stoianov
	Penalties
	Seul (penalty scored); Cîrlan (penalty missed); Hovanschii (penalty scored); Alex Santiago (penalty missed)		(penalty missed) Gheţi; (penalty scored) Wellington; (penalty missed) Guilherme; (penalty missed) Boghiu; (penalty missed) Soporan

== Final ==
The match was scheduled to be played at 27 May 2013.

26 May 2013
17:00

Veris Drăgăneşti	2–2 (a.e.t.)	FC Tiraspol
Cîrlan 87'; Paye 105' (o.g.)	Report	Alexandru S. Grosu 59'; Cheptine 115'
Penalties
Hovanschii (penalty scored); Romaniuc (penalty scored); Milinceanu (penalty missed); Cîrlan (penalty missed)	2–4	Bulat (penalty scored); Maksymenko (penalty scored); Shapoval (penalty scored); Alexandru A. Grosu (penalty scored)

Zimbru Stadium, Chișinău
Attendance: 4,000
Referee: (Austria) Gerhard Grobelnik

== Top goalscorers ==
Updated to matches played on 26 May 2013.

Rank	Player	Club	Goals
1	(Serbia) Marko Markovski	Sheriff Tiraspol	3
2	(Russia) Vasily Pavlov	Dacia Chișinău	2
2	(Russia) Daniil Nikolaev	Zimbru Chișinău	2
2	(Moldova) Vasile Soltan	FC Tiraspol	2
2	(Moldova) Maxim Antoniuc	Iskra-Stal Rîbnița	2

1 goals (29 players)

- (Moldova) Vasile Carauş (FC Dacia Chișinău)
- (Moldova) Alexandru Grab (Locomotiv Bălți)
- (Moldova) Eugen Celeadnic (FC Speranța Crihana Veche)
- (Bulgaria) Georgi Karaneychev (FC Tiraspol)
- (Moldova) Alexandru Stadiiciuc (FC Milsami)
- (Moldova) Dan Spătaru (FC Zimbru Chișinău)
- (Brazil) Henrique Luvannor (FC Sheriff Tiraspol)
- (Serbia) Aleksandar Pešić (FC Sheriff Tiraspol)
- (Romania) Bogdan Hauşi (FC Tiraspol)
- (Moldova) Alexandru S. Grosu (FC Tiraspol)

- (Moldova) Alexandru Bejan (FC Dacia Chișinău)
- (Moldova) Sergiu Namaşco (FC Speranța Crihana Veche)
- (Moldova) Alexei Jularji (FC Dinamo-Auto Tiraspol)
- (Moldova) Gheorghe Boghiu (FC Milsami)
- (Brazil) Guilherme de Paula (FC Milsami)
- (Moldova) Ivan Carandaşov (FC Nistru Otaci)
- (Moldova) Serghei Gheorghiev (FC Sheriff Tiraspol)
- (Moldova) Maxim Hovanschi (FC Veris)
- (Burkina Faso) Wilfried Balima (FC Sheriff Tiraspol)
- (Moldova) Anatol Cheptine (FC Tiraspol)

- (Moldova) Nicolae Nemerenco (FC Dacia Chișinău)
- (Moldova) Oleg Andronic (FC Speranța Crihana Veche)
- (Moldova) Vitalie Bulat (FC Tiraspol)
- (Romania) Cornel Gheţi (FC Milsami)
- (Moldova) Alexandru Bezimov (FC Iskra-Stal)
- (Armenia) Artem Khachaturov (FC Sheriff Tiraspol)
- (Serbia) Saša Marjanović (FC Sheriff Tiraspol)
- (Moldova) Alexandru Popovici (FC Tiraspol)
- (Moldova) Cristian Cîrlan (FC Veris)

=== Hat-tricks ===
Key
^{4}	Player scored four goals
^{5}	Player scored five goals

Player	Home	Away	Result	Date
(Serbia) Marko Markovski	Sheriff Tiraspol	Nistru Otaci	7–0	16 April 2013

== Moldova vs Rest of World ==
Country	Goal's
Moldova	21
Rest of World	16

== TOP Foreign's ==
Place	Country	Goals	Player's	Leading Goalscorer's (Goal's)
1.	Serbia	5	3	Marko Markovski (3)
2.	Russia	4	2	Vasily Pavlov (2), Daniil Nikolaev (2)
3.	Brazil	2	2	Henrique Luvannor (1), Guilherme de Paula (1)
3.	Romania	2	2	Cornel Gheţi (1), Bogdan Hauşi (1)
5.	Bulgaria	1	1	Georgi Karaneychev (1)
5.	Armenia	1	1	Artem Khachaturov (1)
5.	Burkina Faso	1	1	Wilfried Balima (1)
