= Dumitru Bacal =

Moldovan footballer

Personal information
- Date of birth: 28 November 1985 (age 40)
- Place of birth: Moldova
- Height: 1.83 m (6 ft 0 in)
- Position: Defender

Team information
- Current team: CS Petrocub
- Number: 24

Senior career*
| Years | Team | Apps | (Gls) |
| 2006–2009 | CS Tiligul-Tiras Tiraspol | 60 | (4) |
| 2009 | FC Milsami | 11 | (1) |
| 2010 | Dacia Chişinău | 8 | (0) |
| 2011–2014 | FC Rapid Ghidighici | 57 | (6) |
| 2014–2015 | FC Veris | 6 | (1) |
| 2015 | FC Saxan | 5 | (0) |
| 2015– | CS Petrocub | 4 | (0) |
- * Club domestic league appearances and goals

Dumitru Bacal is football player who currently is playing for FC Veris.
