= Victor Gonța =

Moldovan footballer

Personal information
- Full name: Victor Gonța
- Date of birth: 21 September 1988 (age 38)
- Place of birth: Moldova
- Height: 1.80 m (5 ft 11 in)
- Position: Striker

Team information
- Current team: Malkiya Club
- Number: 14

Senior career*
Years	Team	Apps	(Gls)
2007–2009	FC Academia Chișinău	20	(9)
2009–2010	FC Milsami	12	(3)
2011–2013	FC Costuleni	42	(5)
2013	FC Rapid Ghidighici	9	(1)
2013	FC Costuleni	4	(3)
2013–2014	FC Veris	19	(6)
2014	Victoria Bardar	7	(4)
2015–	Malkiya Club	0	(0)
- * Club domestic league appearances and goals as of 01:38, 20 January 2015 (UTC)

Victor Gonța (born 21 September 1988) is a Moldovan football player who currently is playing for Malkiya Club in Bahraini Premier League.
