= Sergiu Matei =

Moldovan footballer

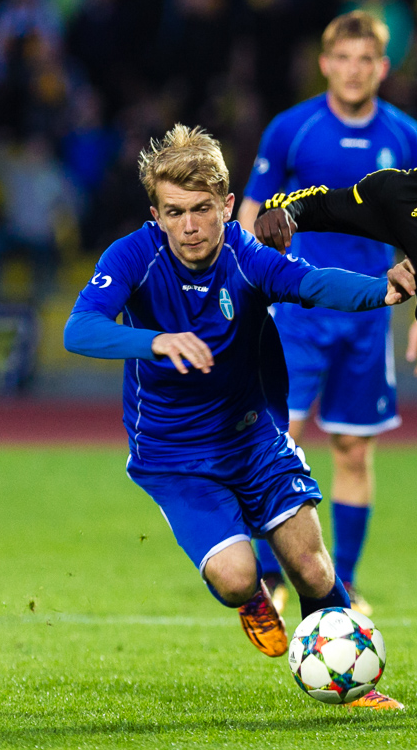
- Sergiu Matei playing for "FC Academia" in 2016

Personal information
- Full name: Matei Sergiu Liviu
- Date of birth: 23 April 1992 (age 34)
- Place of birth: Chișinău
- Height: 1.70 m (5 ft 7 in)
- Position: Midfielder

Team information
- Current team: FC Petrocub Hîncești
- Number: 7

Youth career
- 2001–2011: Zimbru Chișinău

Senior career*
Years	Team	Apps	(Gls)
2007–2011	Zimbru 2 Chișinău	59	(8)
2009–2011	Zimbru Chișinău	2	(0)
2011–2012	FC Sfîntul Gheorghe	12	(1)
2012–2013	FC Veris	9	(4)
2013–2014	FC Speranţa Crihana Veche	25	(2)
2014–2016	FC Academia Chișinău	47	(6)
2016–2018	FC Spicul Chișcăreni	29	(6)
2018–2018	FC Floresti	10	(5)
2018–	FC Petrocub Hîncești	5	(0)

International career
2010–2011	Moldova-19	6	(0)
2012–2015	Moldova-21	29	(0)
- * Club domestic league appearances and goals as of 26 November 2017

Sergiu Matei (born April 23, 1992 in Chișinău), also known professionally as OT BEATZ, is a Moldovan professional footballer who currently plays for FC Petrocub Hîncești in the Moldovan National Division and music producer

== Professional career ==
Sergiu Matei is the disciple of the Zimbru Chisinau Academy and made his debut in the professional football for the first team of Zimbru Chisinau in Moldova National Division against FC Tiraspol at the age of 17, in October 2009.

Between 2012 and 2015 Sergiu Matei played for the U-21 team of Moldova, he is second most capped U-21 player after Artur Patras.

== Music career ==
Sergiu Matei is also a music producer, beatmaker, and DJ known as OT BEATZ. He is known for producing songs for artists like Tory Lanez, Oxxxymiron, Nafe Smallz, MARKUL, Porchy, L'One, ST, Prince Ea, The Motans and other minor worldwide artists.

He also released himself as an artist in 2014 with his first single track "BLVCK", later he releases his second single "Hey World" featuring Mikaella (now Misha Miller).The single is released with an official music video which features the official drummer of the Russian band "Amatory" Daniil [STEWART] Svetlov with a drum part on the drop.

== Honours ==
=== Club ===
==== FC Veris ====
- Moldovan "A" Division

Winner: 2012–13

- Moldovan Cup

Runner-up: 2012–13

==== FC Spicul Chișcăreni ====
- Moldovan "A" Division

Third Place: 2016–17

==== FC Floresti ====
- Moldovan "A" Division

Runner-up: 2018

==== FC Petrocub Hîncești ====
- Moldovan National Division

Third Place: 2018
