= Ibrahima Camara =

Ibrahima Camara may refer to:

- Ibrahima Camara (footballer, born 1985), Guinean footballer
- Ibrahima Camara (footballer, born 1992), Guinean footballer
- Ibrahima Camará (footballer, born 1999), Guinean footballer

== See also ==
- Ibrahim Camara, Guinean judoka
