= Ciumac =

Ciumac is a surname. Notable people with the surname include:

- Andrei Ciumac (born 1985), Moldovan tennis player
- Dumitru Ciumac (born 1981), Moldovan footballer
