= Sergiu Diaconu =

Moldovan footballer

Personal information
- Date of birth: 16 February 1978 (age 48)
- Place of birth: Strășeni, Moldova
- Height: 1.93 m (6 ft 4 in)
- Position: Goalkeeper

Senior career*
Years	Team	Apps	(Gls)
1997–1998	Stimold-MIF Chișinău	12	(0)
1999–2001	Zimbru Chișinău	7	(0)
2000	→ Olimpia Bălți (loan)	25	(0)
2001–2002	Happy End Camenca	1	(0)
2002	Hîncești	6	(0)
2003	Rotor Volgograd	0	(0)
2004	SKA-Energia Khabarovsk	0	(0)
2005	Vostok Ust-Kamenogorsk	5	(0)
2006	Energetik Pavlodar	27	(0)
2007	Politehnica Chișinău	12	(0)
2007	Rapid Ghidighici	10	(0)
2008	Iskra-Stal Rîbnița	2	(0)
2008	Spartak Semey	25	(0)
2010–2012	Rapid Ghidighici	9	(0)
2013–2015	Veris Chișinău	12	(0)
- * Club domestic league appearances and goals

Sergiu Diaconu (born 16 February 1978) is a former Moldovan footballer.

== Career ==
He played in many clubs of Moldova such as Zimbru, Olimpia, Happy End, Polytechnic, Rapid, Iskra-Stal, Veris. Also played in Kazakhstan for FC Vostok, Energetik (Pavlodar) and Spartak. In Russia, he was in the teams "Rotor" and "SKA-Energia", but did not participate in the championship matches. Only in 2003, he took part in the Premier League Cup matches, in which he played for Rotor in all 4 matches (he missed five goals). In 2006, he was at the run carried out by the Belarusian clubs Dnepr and Torpedo (Zhodino), but did not sign the contract with these clubs.

== Achievements ==
=== Team ===
- Two-time winner of the Moldavian Championship: 1998/1999, 1999/2000.
- Winner of Division "A" of Moldova: 2012/2013.

== Family ==
Married. Has three children.
