= Serghei Bobrov =

Moldovan footballer

Personal information
- Date of birth: 7 September 1991 (age 35)
- Place of birth: Moldova
- Position: Midfielder

Team information
- Current team: Florești
- Number: 17

Senior career*
Years	Team	Apps	(Gls)
–2014	Rapid Ghidighici	11	(0)
2014–2015	Academia	8	(1)
2015–2020	Dinamo-Auto	67	(5)
2020–	Florești	28	(2)
- * Club domestic league appearances and goals as of 14:22, 1 June 2021 (UTC)

Serghei Bobrov (born 7 September 1991) is a Moldovan footballer who plays as a midfielder for FC Florești in the Moldovan National Division.

== Career ==
=== Dinamo-Auto ===
In July 2015, Bobrov moved to Dinamo-Auto on a free transfer. He made his league debut for the club on 2 August 2015, coming on as a late substitute for Andrei Bugneac in a 0–0 draw with Zaria.
