= Georgi Georgiev (footballer, born 1988) =

Bulgarian footballer

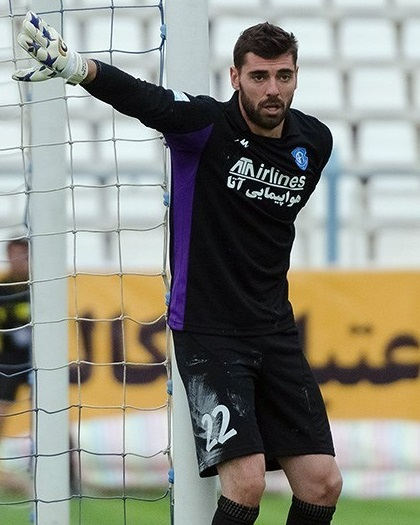

Personal information
- Full name: Georgi Nikolaev Georgiev
- Date of birth: 12 October 1988 (age 38)
- Place of birth: Shumen, Bulgaria
- Height: 1.89 m (6 ft 2 1/2 in)
- Position: Goalkeeper

Team information
- Current team: Spartak Varna II (goalkeeping coach)

Youth career
- Levski Sofia

Senior career*
Years	Team	Apps	(Gls)
2007–2008	Svilengrad	11	(0)
2008–2009	Lokomotiv Mezdra	4	(0)
2010	Minyor Radnevo	13	(0)
2010–2011	Sliven 2000	8	(0)
2011–2013	Tiraspol	58	(0)
2013–2015	Sheriff Tiraspol	0	(0)
2013–2014	→ Tiraspol (loan)	37	(0)
2015	→ Naft Masjed Soleyman (loan)	12	(0)
2015–2016	Gostaresh Foolad	21	(0)
2016–2017	Botev Plovdiv	24	(0)
2017	Dacia Chișinău	7	(0)
2018	Pirin Blagoevgrad	8	(0)
2018	Vereya	16	(0)
2019–2020	Slavia Sofia	19	(0)
2020	Levski Sofia	6	(0)
2020–2023	Cherno More	34	(0)
2023	Cherno More II	1	(0)
2023–2024	Spartak Varna	20	(0)
Total		299	(0)

International career
2019–2021	Bulgaria	8	(0)

Managerial career
- 2024: Spartak Varna (goalkeeping coach)
- 2025–: Spartak Varna II (goalkeeping coach)
- * Club domestic league appearances and goals

Georgi Georgiev (Bulgarian: Георги Георгиев; born 12 October 1988) is a Bulgarian former professional footballer who played as a goalkeeper.

== Career ==
=== Tiraspol ===
On 1 July 2011, Georgiev signed a two-year contract with FC Tiraspol following a successful trial period with the club. He quickly became the first choice goalkeeper. Georgiev made his league debut in a 1–0 away loss against Olimpia Bălţi on 23 July 2011.

On 9 January 2013, Georgiev signed a one-year contract extension, keeping him at Tiraspol until 2014. On 26 May, Georgiev led Tiraspol out as captain in the 2013 Moldovan Cup Final, which they won 6–4 after penalties against Veris Drăgăneşti. He played an important role in the penalty shootout held after the teams remained tied 2–2 after extra time, making two saves.

=== Sheriff Tiraspol ===
Georgiev signed with Sheriff Tiraspol on 13 June 2013 on a three-year deal, for an undisclosed fee.

==== Tiraspol (loan) ====
On 15 August 2013, Georgiev was loaned out to his previous club FC Tiraspol.

=== Dacia Chișinău ===
On 31 July 2017, Georgiev signed a 1 1/2-year contract with Moldovan club Dacia Chișinău.

=== Slavia Sofia ===
He became part of the Slavia Sofia team in February 2019.

=== Levski Sofia ===
On 28 February 2020, Georgiev returned to his boyhood club Levski Sofia, signing a 2,5-year contract.

== International career ==
On 14 November 2019, Georgiev earned his first cap for Bulgaria, playing full 90 minutes in a 0–1 home loss against Paraguay in a friendly match.

== Honours ==
=== Club ===
FC Tiraspol

- Moldovan Cup (1): 2012–13

Botev Plovdiv

- Bulgarian Cup (1): 2016–17
