= PFC Litex Lovech in European football =

Bulgarian club in European football

This article details the history of PFC Litex Lovech in European football competitions. The Bulgarian club has competed in the UEFA Champions League and the UEFA Europa League, accumulating a total record of 72 matches played across 17 seasons of European competition.

== Total statistics ==
Competition	S	P	W	D	L	GF	GA	GD
UEFA Champions League / European Cup	4	16	8	1	7	29	28	+ 1
UEFA Europa League / UEFA Cup	13	56	23	12	21	76	60	+ 16
Total	17	72	31	13	28	105	88	+ 17

== Statistics by country ==
Country	Club	P	W	D	L	GF	GA	GD
Albania	Besa Kavajë	2	2	0	0	6	0	+ 6
Subtotal		2	2	0	0	6	0	+ 6
Austria	Grazer AK	4	1	1	2	2	8	– 6
Subtotal		4	1	1	2	2	8	– 6
Belarus	FC BATE Borisov	2	1	0	1	1	4	– 3
Subtotal		2	1	0	1	1	4	– 3
Belgium	K.R.C. Genk	2	1	1	0	3	2	+ 1
Subtotal		2	1	1	0	3	2	+ 1
Bosnia and Herzegovina	FK Željezničar Sarajevo	2	2	0	0	9	1	+ 8
Subtotal		2	2	0	0	9	1	+ 8
Croatia	HNK Rijeka	2	1	0	1	2	2	0
Subtotal		2	1	0	1	2	2	0
Cyprus	AC Omonia	2	1	1	0	2	1	+ 1
Subtotal		2	1	1	0	2	1	+ 1
England	Aston Villa F.C.	2	0	1	1	2	4	– 2
England	Middlesbrough F.C.	1	0	0	1	0	2	– 2
Subtotal		3	0	1	2	2	6	– 4
France	RC Strasbourg	2	0	1	1	0	2	– 2
Subtotal		2	0	1	1	0	2	– 2
Germany	1. FC Union Berlin	2	1	1	0	2	0	+ 2
Germany	Hamburger SV	2	0	0	2	1	4	– 3
Subtotal		4	1	1	2	3	4	– 1
Greece	AEK Athens	2	0	1	1	3	4	– 1
Greece	Panathinaikos	2	0	0	2	1	3	– 2
Subtotal		4	0	1	3	4	7	– 3
Hungary	Debreceni VSC	2	0	0	2	1	4	– 3
Hungary	Diósgyőri VTK	2	1	0	1	2	3	– 1
Subtotal		4	1	0	3	3	7	– 4
Israel	Hapoel Ironi Kiryat Shmona F.C.	2	1	1	0	2	1	+ 1
Israel	Maccabi Haifa F.C.	2	0	1	1	2	4	– 2
Subtotal		4	1	2	1	4	5	– 1
Latvia	Jelgava	2	0	2	0	3	3	0
Subtotal		2	0	2	0	3	3	0
Lithuania	FK Atlantas	2	2	0	0	8	1	+ 7
Subtotal		2	2	0	0	8	1	+ 7
Malta	Sliema Wanderers F.C.	2	2	0	0	7	0	+ 7
Subtotal		2	2	0	0	7	0	+ 7
Moldova	FC Zimbru Chişinău	2	0	1	1	0	2	– 2
Moldova	Veris Chişinău	2	1	1	0	3	0	+ 3
Subtotal		4	1	2	1	3	2	+ 1
Montenegro	FK Mogren	2	2	0	0	5	1	+ 4
Montenegro	FK Rudar Pljevlja	2	2	0	0	5	0	+ 5
Subtotal		4	4	0	0	10	1	+ 9
Netherlands	AZ Alkmaar	1	0	0	1	0	2	– 2
Subtotal		1	0	0	1	0	2	– 2
Northern Ireland	Glentoran F.C.	2	2	0	0	5	0	+ 5
Subtotal		2	2	0	0	5	0	+ 5
Poland	Widzew Łódź	2	1	0	1	5	5	0
Poland	Wisła Kraków	2	0	0	2	2	5	– 3
Subtotal		4	1	0	3	7	10	– 3
Republic of Ireland	Longford Town F.C.	2	1	1	0	3	1	+ 2
Subtotal		2	1	1	0	3	1	+ 2
Russia	FC Spartak Moscow	2	0	0	2	2	11	– 9
Subtotal		2	0	0	2	2	11	– 9
Slovakia	FK Inter Bratislava	2	1	0	1	3	1	+ 2
Slovakia	MŠK Žilina	2	0	1	1	2	4	– 2
Subtotal		4	1	1	2	5	5	0
Slovenia	FC Koper	2	2	0	0	6	0	+ 6
Subtotal		2	2	0	0	6	0	+ 6
Sweden	Halmstads BK	2	1	0	1	3	2	+ 1
Subtotal		2	1	0	1	3	2	+ 1
Switzerland	Grasshopper Club Zürich	1	1	0	0	2	1	+ 1
Subtotal		1	1	0	0	2	1	+ 1
Ukraine	FC Dnipro Dnipropetrovsk	1	1	0	0	2	0	+ 2
Ukraine	FC Dynamo Kyiv	2	0	0	2	1	3	– 2
Subtotal		3	1	0	2	3	3	0
Total		74	31	15	28	108	91	+ 17

== Statistics by competition ==
=== UEFA Champions League / European Cup ===
Season	Round	Club	Home	Away	Aggregate
1998–99	First qualifying round	(Sweden) Halmstad	2–0	1–2	3–2
1998–99	Second qualifying round	(Russia) Spartak Moscow	0–5	2–6	2–11
1999–00	First qualifying round	(Northern Ireland) Glentoran	3–0	2–0	5–0
1999–00	Second qualifying round	(Poland) Widzew Łódź	4–1	1–4 (a.e.t.)	5–5 (2–3 p)
2010–11	Second qualifying round	(Montenegro) Rudar Pljevlja	1–0	4–0	5–0
2010–11	Third qualifying round	(Slovakia) Žilina	1–1	1–3	2–4
2011–12	Second qualifying round	(Montenegro) Mogren	3–0	2–1	5–1
2011–12	Third qualifying round	(Poland) Wisła Kraków	1–2	1–3	2–5

=== UEFA Europa League / UEFA Cup ===
Season	Round	Club	Home	Away	Aggregate
1998–99	First round	(Austria) Grazer AK	1–1	0–2	1–3
2001–02	Qualifying round	(Republic of Ireland) Longford Town	2–0	1–1	3–1
2001–02	First round	(Slovakia) Inter Bratislava	3–0	0–1	3–1
2001–02	Second round	(Germany) Union Berlin	0–0	2–0	2–0
2001–02	Third round	(Greece) AEK Athens	1–1	2–3	3–4
2002–03	Qualifying round	(Lithuania) Atlantas	5–0	3–1	8–1
2002–03	First round	(Greece) Panathinaikos	0–1	1–2 (a.e.t.)	1–3
2003–04	Qualifying round	(Moldova) Zimbru Chişinău	0–0	0–2	0–2
2004–05	Second qualifying round	(Bosnia and Herzegovina) Željezničar Sarajevo	7–0	2–1	9–1
2004–05	First round	(Austria) Grazer AK	1–0	0–5	1–5
2005–06	Second qualifying round	(Croatia) Rijeka	1–0	1–2	2–2 (a)
2005–06	First round	(Belgium) Genk	2–2	1–0	3–2
2005–06	Group stage (D)	(Switzerland) Grasshopper	2–1		3rd place
2005–06	Group stage (D)	(Ukraine) Dnipro Dnipropetrovsk		2–0	3rd place
2005–06	Group stage (D)	(Netherlands) AZ	0–2		3rd place
2005–06	Group stage (D)	(England) Middlesbrough		0–2	3rd place
2005–06	Round of 32	(France) Strasbourg	0–2	0–0	0–2
2006–07	First qualifying round	(Slovenia) Koper	5–0	1–0	6–0
2006–07	Second qualifying round	(Cyprus) Omonia	2–1	0–0	2–1
2006–07	First round	(Israel) Maccabi Haifa	1–3	1–1	2–4
2007–08	First qualifying round	(Malta) Sliema Wanderers	4–0	3–0	7–0
2007–08	Second qualifying round	(Albania) Besa Kavajë	3–0	3–0	6–0
2007–08	First round	(Germany) Hamburg	0–1	1–3	1–4
2008–09	Second qualifying round	(Israel) Ironi Kiryat Shmona	0–0	2–1	2–1
2008–09	First round	(England) Aston Villa	1–3	1–1	2–4
2009–10	Play-off round	(Belarus) BATE Borisov	0–4 (a.e.t.)	1–0	1–4
2010–11	Play-off round	(Hungary) Debrecen	1–2	0–2	1–4
2011–12	Play-off round	(Ukraine) Dynamo Kyiv	1–2	0–1	1–3
2014–15	First qualifying round	(Moldova) Veris Chișinău	3–0	0–0	3–0
2014–15	Second qualifying round	(Hungary) Diósgyőri VTK	0–2	2–1	2–3
2015–16	First qualifying round	(Latvia) Jelgava	2–2	1–1	3–3 (a)
