= Pavel Novitskiy =

Russian footballer

Personal information
- Full name: Pavel Anatolyevich Novitskiy
- Date of birth: 6 April 1989 (age 37)
- Place of birth: Chișinău, Moldovan SSR
- Height: 1.87 m (6 ft 1 1/2 in)
- Position: Defender

Youth career
- FC Nika Moscow

Senior career*
Years	Team	Apps	(Gls)
2007	FC Nika Moscow	8	(0)
2008–2010	FC Lokomotiv Moscow	0	(0)
2010	FC Nika Moscow	14	(0)
2011	FC Krylia Sovetov Samara	4	(0)
2012	FC Metallurg-Kuzbass-2 Novokuznetsk		
2013–2014	FC Veris	10	(1)
- * Club domestic league appearances and goals

Pavel Anatolyevich Novitskiy (Russian: Па́вел Анато́льевич Нови́цкий; born 6 April 1989) is a former Russian professional footballer.

== Club career ==
He made his professional debut in the Russian Second Division in 2007 for FC Nika Moscow.
