= Andrei Marina =

Moldovan footballer

Personal information
- Full name: Andrei Marina
- Date of birth: 21 February 1990 (age 36)
- Place of birth: Moldova
- Height: 1.73 m (5 ft 8 in)
- Position: Midfielder

Team information
- Current team: FC Olimpia Bălți
- Number: 12

Senior career*
| Years | Team | Apps | (Gls) |
| 2007–2011 | FC Academia Chişinău | 62 | (2) |
| 2011–2012 | Zimbru Chișinău | 7 | (1) |
| 2012–2013 | FC Speranţa Crihana Veche | 12 | (2) |
| 2013 | Zimbru Chişinău | 5 | (0) |
| 2013– | FC Olimpia Bălți | 17 | (2) |
- * Club domestic league appearances and goals

Andrei Marina is a Moldovan football player who currently is playing for FC Olimpia Bălți.
