= Serghei Secu =

Moldovan footballer (born 1972)

Personal information
- Date of birth: 28 November 1972 (age 53)
- Place of birth: Chișinău, Moldavian SSR, Soviet Union
- Height: 1.84 m (6 ft 0 in)
- Position: Defender

Senior career*
Years	Team	Apps	(Gls)
1989–1991	Nistru/Zimbru Chișinău	44	(0)
1992–1993	Amocom Chișinău	48	(3)
1994–1998	Tiligul-Tiras Tiraspol	95	(17)
2000	Śląsk Wrocław	3	(0)
2002	SKA-Energia Khabarovsk	3	(0)
2003	Zhenis Astana	9	(0)
2003–2004	Unisport-Auto Chișinău	1	(0)
2004–2005	Steaua Chișinău	25	(1)
2005	Banants Yerevan	3	(0)
2006	CSCA-Steaua Chișinău	11	(0)
2007	Săcele	13	(1)
2008–2009	Buiucani	9	(2)
2009	Kücük Kaymakli		
Total		264	(24)

International career
1987–1989	Soviet Union U18	40	(0)
1991–1997	Moldova	27	(1)

Managerial career
- 2008–2009: CSCT Buiucani
- 2009: CSCA-Rapid Chișinău (interim)
- 2010–2012: CSCA-Rapid Chișinău
- 2017: Academia Chișinău
- 2017–2018: Sfîntul Gheorghe
- 2018: Zimbru Chișinău
- 2020–2021: Moldova U19
- 2022–2025: Moldova (assistant)
- * Club domestic league appearances and goals

Serghei Secu (born 28 November 1972) is a Moldovan football manager and former player who played as defender. Between 1991 and 1997 Secu played 27 matches for Moldova national team, scoring 1 goal. He holds UEFA PRO manager licence.

== Career statistics ==
Scores and results list Moldova's goal tally first.

No	Date	Venue	Opponent	Score	Result	Competition
1.	12 October 1994	Stadionul Republican, Chişinău, Moldova	Wales	2–1	3–2	Euro 1996 qualifier

== Honours ==
Tiligul-Tiras Tiraspol

- Moldovan Championship runner-up: 1993–94, 1994–95, 1995–96, 1997–98
- Moldovan Cup: 1993–94, 1994–95; runner-up 1995–96
