= Mihai Țurcan (footballer, born 1989) =

Moldovan footballer

Personal information
- Full name: Mihai Țurcan
- Date of birth: 20 August 1989 (age 37)
- Place of birth: Bălți, Moldova
- Height: 1.86 m (6 ft 1 in)
- Position: Forward

Senior career*
| Years | Team | Apps | (Gls) |
| 2009–2010 | Milsami Orhei | 14 | (0) |
| 2010–2011 | Zimbru Chișinău | 22 | (6) |
| 2011–2012 | Olimpia Bălți | 2 | (0) |
| 2012–2013 | FC Tiraspol | 30 | (3) |
| 2013–2014 | Veris Chișinău | 24 | (7) |
| 2014–2015 | Academia Chișinău | 7 | (4) |
| 2016 | Kaisar | 8 | (0) |
| 2016 | Academia Chișinău | 9 | (0) |
| 2017 | Sillamäe Kalev | 2 | (0) |
- * Club domestic league appearances and goals as of 15:44, 15 June 2017 (UTC)

Mihai Țurcan (born 20 August 1989) is a Moldovan football forward who last played for JK Sillamäe Kalev.

== Club statistics ==
- Total matches played in Moldovan First League: 75 matches - 14 goal
