= Dumitru Ciumac =

Moldovan footballer

Personal information
- Date of birth: 7 December 1981 (age 44)
- Place of birth: Chișinău, Soviet Union
- Height: 1.89 m (6 ft 2 in)
- Position: Central midfielder

Youth career
- CSA Victoria Chișinău

Senior career*
Years	Team	Apps	(Gls)
2000–2002	CSA Buiucani Chișinău	50	(24)
2002–2003	Metalurh Zaporizhzhia	0	(0)
2002–2003	→ Metalurh-2 Zaporizhzhia (loan)	19	(2)
2004	Ceahlăul Piatra Neamț	6	(0)
2005	Dacia Chișinău	11	(0)
2005	Slavia Mozyr	10	(0)
2006–2007	Politehnica Chișinău	3	(0)
2008–2009	Küçük Kaymaklı Türk		
Total		83	(25)
- * Club domestic league appearances and goals

Dumitru Ciumac (born 7 December 1981) is a Moldovan former footballer who played as a midfielder.
