= Dumitru Seul =

Moldovan footballer

Personal information
- Full name: Dumitru Seul
- Date of birth: 31 March 1987 (age 39)
- Place of birth: Chișinău, Moldova
- Height: 1.81 m (5 ft 11 1/2 in)
- Position: Midfielder

Team information
- Current team: FC Veris
- Number: 88

Senior career*
Years	Team	Apps	(Gls)
2009–2010	FC Rapid Ghidighici	23	(1)
2013–	FC Veris	19	(0)
- * Club domestic league appearances and goals as of 30 May 2014

Dumitru Seul (born 31 March 1987) is a Moldovan football midfielder who plays for FC Veris.

== Club statistics ==
- Total matches played in Moldavian First League: 42 matches - 1 goal
