= Dumitru Arabadji =

Moldovan football manager

Personal information
- Full name: Dumitru Arabadji
- Date of birth: 17 January 1972 (age 54)
- Place of birth: Reni, Ukrainian SSR, Soviet Union
- Height: 1.76 m (5 ft 9 1/2 in)

Team information
- Current team: FC Dinamo-Auto Tiraspol

Senior career*
Years	Team	Apps	(Gls)
1993–1994	Evis Mykolaiv	0	(0)
1995–1997	CSA Victoria Cahul	53	(9)
1997	Metalurh Mariupol	2	(0)
1998	CSA Victoria Cahul	10	(1)
1999	Nistru Otaci	10	(0)
2000	Olimpia Bălți	17	(0)
2000–2002	Nistru Otaci	28	(1)
2002–2004	Agro-Goliador Chișinău	22	(0)
2004–2005	Steaua Chişinău	12	(0)

Managerial career
- 2010–2014: Dinamo-Auto Tiraspol
- 2015–2016: Gagauziya-Oguzsport
- 2016: Sfîntul Gheorghe
- 2020–2021: Cahul-2005
- 2021–2022: Petrocub Hîncești (assistant)
- 2022–: Zimbru Chișinău (assistant)
- * Club domestic league appearances and goals as of 6 February 2015 ‡ National team caps and goals as of 6 February 2015

Dumitru Arabadji (born 17 January 1972) is a Moldovan professional football manager. Since July 2010, he is the head coach of the Moldovan football club FC Dinamo-Auto Tiraspol.
