= Alexei Koșelev =

Moldovan footballer

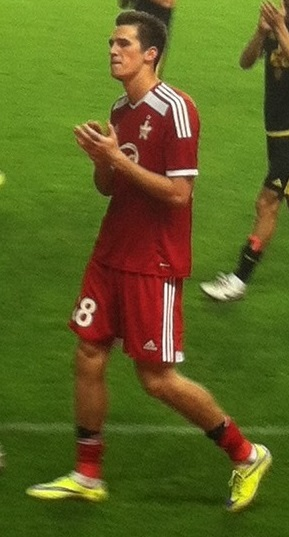
- Koșelev with Sheriff Tiraspol in 2015

Personal information
- Full name: Alexei Koșelev
- Date of birth: 19 November 1993 (age 32)
- Place of birth: Chișinău, Moldova
- Height: 2.00 m (6 ft 6 1/2 in)
- Position: Goalkeeper

Team information
- Current team: Volos
- Number: 55

Youth career
- 2014: Kuban Krasnodar

Senior career*
Years	Team	Apps	(Gls)
2010–2011	Găgăuzia	11	(0)
2011–2013	Dacia-2 Buiucani	8	(0)
2012–2013	→ Real-Succes (loan)	4	(0)
2014–2015	Saxan Gagauz Yeri	12	(0)
2015	Tiraspol	10	(0)
2015–2017	Sheriff Tiraspol	47	(0)
2017–2018	Politehnica Iași	14	(0)
2018–2021	Fortuna Sittard	68	(0)
2021–2023	Júbilo Iwata	4	(0)
2023–2024	Lamia	38	(0)
2024–2026	Atromitos	9	(0)
2026–	Volos	1	(0)

International career^{‡}
2012–2015	Moldova U21	18	(0)
2015–2024	Moldova	26	(0)
- * Club domestic league appearances and goals as of 13 September 2026 ‡ National team caps and goals as of 1 April 2024

Alexei Koșelev (born 19 November 1993) is a Moldovan professional footballer who plays as a goalkeeper for Super League Greece club Volos.

== Club career ==
=== Sheriff Tiraspol ===
In the summer of 2015 Koșelev signed for FC Sheriff Tiraspol. In his first season he made 25 appearances in the Moldovan National Division conceding 10 goals and having 15 clean sheets. His performances helped Sheriff secure the 2015–16 and the 2016–17 Moldovan National Division.

=== Fortuna Sittard ===
In July 2018, Koșelev moved to Dutch club Fortuna Sittard, signing on a three-year deal. He made his league debut for the club on 11 August 2018 in a 1–1 away draw with Excelsior, playing all ninety minutes of the match.

== International career ==
Koșelev made 18 appearances for the Moldova national under-21 team. He was a standout player during the 2015 European U-21 qualification campaign, having six clean sheets in 10 qualifying games.

In 2015, he made his senior debut for the Moldova national team in a qualifying match against Russia.

== Honours ==
Sheriff Tiraspol

- Moldovan National Division: 2015–16, 2016–17
- Moldovan Cup: 2016–17
- Moldovan Super Cup: 2015, 2016

Júbilo Iwata

- J2 League: 2021
