= 2008–09 Moldovan "B" Division =

Moldovan "B" Division
- Season: 2008–09

The 2008–09 Moldovan "B" Division (Romanian: Divizia B) was the 18th season of Moldovan football's third-tier league. There are 26 teams in the competition, in two groups, 12 in the North and 14 in the South.

== "B" Division North ==
=== Final standings ===
Pos	Team	Pld	W	D	L	GF	GA	GD	Pts
1	FC Costuleni	22	20	2	0	86	6	+80	62
2	CS Drochia	22	14	5	3	45	25	+20	47
3	FC Glodeni	22	15	1	6	60	28	+32	46
4	Flacăra Faleşti	22	10	8	4	42	31	+11	38
5	CSF Cricova	22	11	3	8	45	38	+7	36
6	Tiras Tyraspol	22	8	7	7	29	35	−6	31
7	FC Florești	22	6	8	8	31	37	−6	26
8	Volna Soroca	22	6	4	12	39	48	−9	22
9	FC Teleneşti	22	5	3	14	26	53	−27	18
10	Real-Succes Cricova	22	5	2	15	37	86	−49	17
11	Tiras Criuleni	22	5	0	17	26	57	−31	15
12	CF Rîşcani	22	4	3	15	31	53	−22	15

== "B" Division South ==
=== Final standings ===
Pos	Team	Pld	W	D	L	GF	GA	GD	Pts
1	Viişoara Mileștii Mici	24	20	2	2	73	23	+50	62
2	Fortuna Pleșeni	24	19	3	2	85	22	+63	60
3	Victoria Bardar	24	16	4	4	65	28	+37	52
4	Univ. Agrară Eikomena-2 Chișinău	24	14	1	9	57	33	+24	43
5	FC Slobozia Mare	24	12	3	9	53	35	+18	39
6	Kolos Copceac	24	10	7	7	49	37	+12	37
7	Sinteza Căușeni	24	10	4	10	44	53	−9	34
8	Speranţa Cahul	24	8	3	13	38	54	−16	27
9	Maiak Chirsova	24	7	4	13	37	56	−19	25
10	Locomotiva Basarabeasca	24	8	0	16	27	49	−22	24
11	FC Cantemir	24	5	5	14	31	50	−19	20
12	FC Vulcaneşti	24	4	2	18	28	100	−72	14
13	FC Congaz	24	1	6	17	21	68	−47	9
–	Ceadîr Orizont SC (W)	0	0	0	0	0	0	0	0

(W) Withdrew
