= FC Real-Succes =

- Full name: Football Club Real-Succes
- Founded: 2008
- Dissolved: 2009 (merged with RS Lilcora)
- Ground: Stadionul Sătesc; Hîrtopul Mare, Moldova
- Capacity: 1,000

FC Real-Succes was a Moldovan football club from Hîrtopul Mare, Moldova. They played in the Moldovan "B" Division, the third tier of Moldovan football.

== History ==
Football Club Real-Succes was founded in 2008. The same year they participated in the 2008–09 Moldovan "B" Division and finished 10th. In summer 2009 they merged with amateur football club Lilcora to form a new club RS Lilcora.

== League results ==
Season	Div.	Pos.	Pl.	W	D	L	GS	GA	P	Cup	Europe	Top Scorer (League)	Head Coach
2008–09	3rd "North"	10	5	2	15	4	37	86	17	Round of 64	—		

== See also ==
- RS Lilcora FC
