= Nando (footballer, born 1990) =

Brazilian footballer

Personal information
- Full name: Fernando Henrique Quintela Cavalcante
- Date of birth: 3 May 1990 (age 36)
- Place of birth: São Paulo, Brazil
- Height: 1.82 m (6 ft 0 in)
- Position: Attacking midfielder

Team information
- Current team: PAEEK
- Number: 8

Senior career*
Years	Team	Apps	(Gls)
2008–2010	Corinthians B		
2009	→ Ferroviária (loan)		
2010	→ Nacional (loan)		
2010–2011	Corinthians Alagoano		
2011–2012	Le Mans	0	(0)
2011–2012	Le Mans B	9	(0)
2012–2013	Bnei Sakhnin	0	(0)
2013	→ Al-Ittihad Tripoli (loan)		
2014	Zimbru Chișinău	11	(1)
2014–2015	Nacional		
2015–2017	THOI Lakatamia	49	(15)
2017–2018	Oborishte	28	(6)
2018–2019	PAEEK	28	(12)
2019–2020	Dunav Ruse	26	(1)
2021–	PAEEK	21	(3)
- * Club domestic league appearances and goals as of 17 August 2022

Fernando Henrique Quintela Cavalcante (born 3 May 1990 in São Paulo), commonly known as Nando, is a Brazilian footballer who plays as a midfielder for PAEEK in the Cypriot Second Division.

== Career ==
In January 2014, Fernando signed with Zimbru Chișinău from Moldovan National Division.

In July 2015, Fernando signed a 2-year contract with Cypriot club THOI Lakatamia.

In June 2017, he signed a 1-year contract with Bulgarian Second League side Oborishte. He left the club at the end of the season following the relegation to Third League. In June 2019, Nando returned to Bulgaria, signing a two-year contract with Dunav Ruse.

== Honours ==
Zimbru

- Moldovan Cup: 2013–14
