= Bogdan Hauși =

Romanian footballer

Personal information
- Full name: Bogdan Vasile Hauși
- Date of birth: 29 September 1985 (age 41)
- Place of birth: Baia Mare, Romania
- Height: 1.89 m (6 ft 2 in)
- Position: Defender

Youth career
- 2003–2007: Baia Mare

Senior career*
Years	Team	Apps	(Gls)
2007–2008	Baia Mare	28	(2)
2008–2009	Iskra-Stal	31	(8)
2010–2011	Zakarpattya Uzhgorod	28	(2)
2011–2012	Zimbru Chișinău	14	(2)
2012	Rapid Ghidighici	16	(2)
2013–2014	FC Tiraspol	38	(7)
2015–2016	Buxoro	10	(1)
2016–2019	Viitorul Ulmeni	21	(13)
2019–2021	Progresul Șomcuta Mare	10	(7)
Total		196	(44)

Managerial career
- 2021: Minaur Baia Mare (fitness coach)
- * Club domestic league appearances and goals as of 07:48, 23 September 2021 (UTC)

Bogdan Vasile Hauși (born 29 September 1985) is a Romanian former professional footballer who played as a defender for FC Baia Mare, Iskra-Stal, Zakarpattya Uzhgorod or FC Tiraspol, among others.

== Career ==
=== Club ===
Hauși debuted as senior in 2007 at Romanian club FC Baia Mare. In 2008, he was transferred to Moldovan club Iskra-Stal Rîbnița. In 2010 signed a contract with Ukrainian side FC Zakarpattya Uzhgorod, for which he played until 2011. Later Hauși played for Moldovan clubs Zimbru Chișinău, Rapid Ghidighici and FC Tiraspol. In 2015 Hauși moved to Uzbekistani side FK Buxoro.

== Honours ==
FC Tiraspol

- Divizia Națională Runner-up: 2013/2014
- Moldovan Cup (1): 2012/2013
- Moldovan Supercup Runner-up: 2013/2014
