= Valeriu Tiron =

Moldovan footballer (born 1993)

Personal information
- Full name: Valeriu Tiron
- Date of birth: 8 April 1993 (age 33)
- Place of birth: Chișinău, Moldova
- Height: 1.73 m (5 ft 8 in)
- Position: Midfielder

Team information
- Current team: Codru Lozova
- Number: 11

Youth career
- Dacia Chişinău
- Zimbru Chișinău
- Steaua București
- Gheorghe Hagi academy

Senior career*
Years	Team	Apps	(Gls)
2013–2014	Veris Chișinău	25	(2)
2014–2015	Botoșani	1	(0)
2014	→ Foresta Suceava (loan)	3	(0)
2015–2016	Academia Chișinău	33	(1)
2016–2017	Dinamo-Auto	11	(0)
2018	Speranța Nisporeni	11	(1)
2019	Dobrudzha Dobrich	4	(0)
2019–	Codru Lozova	5	(0)

International career
2013–2014	Moldova U-21	2	(1)
- * Club domestic league appearances and goals as of 21:37, 29 December 2019 (UTC)

Valeriu Tiron (born 8 April 1993) is a Moldovan football player who plays as a midfielder for FC Codru Lozova. He was a member of Moldova-21.
