= Ion Burlacu =

Moldovian footballer

Personal information
- Full name: Ion Burlacu
- Date of birth: 3 February 1995 (age 31)
- Place of birth: Chișinău, Moldova
- Height: 1.77 m (5 ft 9 1/2 in)
- Position: Defender

Team information
- Current team: Spartanii Selemet
- Number: 3

Senior career*
| Years | Team | Apps | (Gls) |
| 2011–2016 | FC Academia Chișinău | 33 | (1) |
| 2019- | Spartanii Selemet | 3 | (0) |
- * Club domestic league appearances and goals as of 30 May 2014

Ion Burlacu (born 3 February 1995) is a Moldavian football defender who plays for Spartanii Selemet.

== Club statistics ==
- Total matches played in Moldavian First League: 33 matches - 1 goal
