= Andrei Bugneac =

Moldovan footballer

Personal information
- Date of birth: 30 March 1988 (age 38)
- Place of birth: Chişinău, Moldova
- Height: 1.88 m (6 ft 2 in)
- Position: Striker

Team information
- Current team: FC Dinamo-Auto Tiraspol

Senior career*
Years	Team	Apps	(Gls)
2007–2008	Steaua Chişinău		
2008–2009	FC Iskra-Stal		(2)
2009–2011	Rapid Chişinău	2	(11)
2011–2012	FC Academia UTM	11	(0)
2012	FC Rapid Ghidighici	18	(1)
2013–2014	FC Costuleni	40	(10)
2014–2015	FC Veris	12	(0)
2015	Zimbru Chișinău	3	(0)
2015–2016	FC Dinamo-Auto Tiraspol	26	(11)
2016–2017	FK Andijan	7	(0)
2017–	FC Dinamo-Auto Tiraspol	2	(1)

International career^{‡}
2014–	Moldova	2	(0)
- * Club domestic league appearances and goals as of 7 March 2017 ‡ National team caps and goals as of 17 March 2015

Andrei Bugneac (born 30 March 1988) is a Moldovan footballer who currently plays for FC Dinamo-Auto Tiraspol as a striker.

== International career ==
Bugneac played his first international game with the senior national team on 7 June 2014 in and against Cameroon (1–0), after he came on as a substitute for Alexandru Antoniuc in the 53rd minute of that game.
