= Serghei Dubrovin =

Moldovan football manager

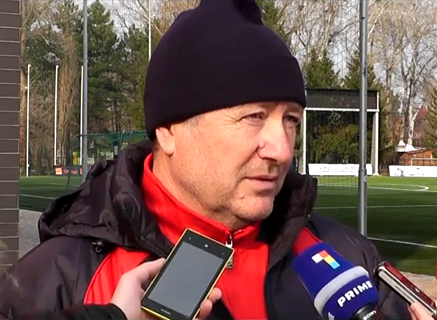
- Dubrovin in 2015

Personal information
- Date of birth: 4 January 1952 (age 74)
- Place of birth: Bălți, Moldovan SSR
- Height: 1.82 m (6 ft 0 in)
- Position: Midfielder

Team information
- Current team: Milsami Orhei (assistant manager)

Senior career*
Years	Team	Apps	(Gls)
1976	Speranța Drochia	38	(3)
1977–1984	Nistru Chișinău	248	(16)

Managerial career
- Moldovan SSR
- 1992: Bugeac Comrat
- 1992–1993: Tiligul Tiraspol
- Spumante Cricova
- Unisport-Auto Chișinău
- Agro Chișinău
- Maldives
- Moldova U-21
- 1998: Tiligul Tiraspol
- 1999–2000: PKT Bontang
- 2001–2003: Petrokimia Putra
- 2002–2003: Indonesia U-23
- 2004–2005: Persija Jakarta
- 2008: Rapid Ghidighici
- 2010: Moldova U-17
- 2010–2011: Manado United
- 2011–2012: Persidafon Dafonsoro
- 2013: Zimbru Chișinău
- 2013: CF Găgăuzia
- 2013: Speranța Crihana Veche
- 2013–2014: Speranța Crihana Veche
- 2015: Zaria Bălți
- 2020–2023: Milsami Orhei
- 2023–: Milsami Orhei (assistant)
- * Club domestic league appearances and goals

Serghei Dubrovin (born January 4, 1952) is a Moldovan football manager and a former player who is an executive assistant to the manager of Milsami Orhei in the Moldovan National Division.

== Managerial career ==
In March 2020, Dubrovin was appointed head coach of FC Milsami Orhei.

== Honours ==
=== Manager ===
PKT Bontang

- Liga Indonesia Premier Division runner-up: 1999–2000

Petrokimia Putra

- Liga Indonesia Premier Division: 2002
