= Radivoje Golubović =

Montenegrin footballer

Personal information
- Full name: Radivoje Golubović
- Date of birth: 22 April 1990 (age 36)
- Place of birth: Podgorica, Montenegro
- Height: 1.85 m (6 ft 1 in)
- Position: Right back

Senior career*
Years	Team	Apps	(Gls)
2009–2013	Budućnost	77	(14)
2013–2014	Mogren	12	(1)
2014–2015	Dacia Chișinău	13	(4)
2015	Mladost Podgorica	1	(0)
2016	Iskra	8	(0)
2016–2018	Dečić	39	(5)
2018–2019	Kom		
- * Club domestic league appearances and goals as of 6 August 2016

Radivoje Golubović (born 22 April 1990) is a Montenegrin footballer who most recently played as a right back for Montenegrin Second League club Kom Podgorica.

== Club statistics ==
- Total matches played in Moldavian First League: 13 matches - 4 goals and 1 goal from Moldovan Cup
