= Igor Ursachi =

Moldovan footballer

Personal information
- Date of birth: 7 July 1962 (age 64)
- Place of birth: Chişinău, Moldavian SSR, Soviet Union
- Height: 1.78 m (5 ft 10 in)
- Position: Midfielder

Senior career*
Years	Team	Apps	(Gls)
1979–1985	Nistru Chişinău	?	(?)
1980	Automobilist Tiraspol (loan)	?	(?)
1985–1986	SKA Odesa	?	(?)
1987–1992	Valeologia Chișinău	?	(?)
1992–1996	MHM-93 Chișinău	?	(?)

Managerial career
- 1989–1992: Valeologia Chișinău (coach-player)
- 1992–1996: MHM-93 Chișinău (coach player)
- 1996–1997: Unisport-Auto Chișinău
- 1997–1999: ULIM Chișinău
- 1999–2004: Dacia Chișinău
- 2004–2006: Moldova (assistant)
- 2006–2007: Khazar Lankaran (assistant)
- 2007–2008: Moldova (futsal)
- 2010: Taraz
- 2010–2011: Costuleni
- 2011–2012: Veris Chișinău
- 2012: Speranţa Crihana Veche
- 2013: Olimpia Bălți
- 2014: Costuleni
- 2014–2015: Moldova U21 (caretaker)
- 2017–2019: Ungheni
- 2020: Codru Lozova
- 2024: Florești
- 2025: Spartanii Sportul
- * Club domestic league appearances and goals

Igor Ursachi (born 7 July 1962) is a retired Moldovan football player.

== Honours ==
- Azerbaijan Top League 2006-07 with Khazar Lankaran
- 2006–07 Azerbaijan Cup with Khazar Lankaran
- 2011–12 Moldovan "B" Division with Veris Chișinău
