= Adil Rhaili =

Moroccan footballer (born 1991)

Personal information
- Full name: Adil Rhaili
- Date of birth: 25 April 1991 (age 35)
- Place of birth: Casablanca, Morocco
- Height: 1.93 m (6 ft 4 in)
- Position: Centre back

Team information
- Current team: Al-Khor
- Number: 5

Youth career
- 1997–2004: Raja Casablanca

Senior career*
Years	Team	Apps	(Gls)
2008–2010	FAR Rabat		
2010–2012	Raja Casablanca		
2012–2013	Alki Larnaca	10	(0)
2013–2016	Milsami Orhei	53	(4)
2016–2017	Al Kuwait	45	(6)
2017–2019	Umm Salal	45	(4)
2020	Wydad AC	3	(0)
2020–2022	Apollon Smyrnis	3	(0)
2022–2023	JS Soualem	11	(1)
2023	Umm Salal	12	(1)
2023–2025	Al-Khor	35	(4)
2025–	MAS Fès	22	(1)
- * Club domestic league appearances and goals as of 14:50, 7 juillet 2026 (UTC)

Adil Rhaili (born 25 April 1991) is a Moroccan professional footballer who plays as a defender.

== Career ==
=== Apollon Smyrnis ===
On 8 July 2021, Apollon Smyrnis announced the signing of a new contract with Rhaili, even though he had played only once in the previous season, as he got a serious injury in the first match that made him lose the rest of the season.

== Career statistics ==
=== Club ===
As of match played 14 July 2015

Club	Season	League			National Cup		Continental		Other		Total	
Club	Season	Division	Apps	Goals	Apps	Goals	Apps	Goals	Apps	Goals	Apps	Goals
Milsami Orhei	2012–13	Divizia Națională	11	0	1	0	-		-		12	0
Milsami Orhei	2013–14	Divizia Națională	19	1	2	0	4	0	-		25	1
Milsami Orhei	2014–15	Divizia Națională	23	3	1	0	-		-		24	3
Milsami Orhei	2015–16	Divizia Națională	0	0	0	0	1	0	0	0	1	0
Milsami Orhei	Total		53	4	4	0	5	0	0	0	62	4
Career total			53	4	4	0	5	0	0	0	62	4

== Honours ==
Raja Casablanca (1)

- Botola (1): 2010–11

Milsami Orhei (1)

- Divizia Națională (1): 2014–15

Kuwait sc (4)

- Kuwait Premier League: 2016–07
- Kuwait Emir Cup: 2017
- Kuwait Crown Prince Cup: 2017
- Kuwait Super Cup: 2017

MAS Fès (1)

- Botola Pro: 2025–26
