= Karlo Belak =

Croatian football player

Personal information
- Date of birth: 22 April 1991 (age 35)
- Place of birth: Samobor, Croatia
- Height: 1.83 m (6 ft 0 in)
- Position: Midfielder

Team information
- Current team: Lučko
- Number: 2

Senior career*
Years	Team	Apps	(Gls)
2012–2013	Rudeš	20	(3)
2013	Lučko	17	(2)
2013–2016	Milsami Orhei	44	(7)
2017–2019	Lučko	20	(1)
2019	Vrapče		
2019–2020	Fürstenfeld	20	(5)
2021–	Lučko		
- * Club domestic league appearances and goals as of 4 June 2022

Karlo Belak (born 22 April 1991) is a Croatian footballer who plays as a midfielder for Lučko.

== Club career ==
Belak joined NK Vrapče in 2019. He then had a spell in the Austrian lower leagues with Fürstenfeld.
