= Crihana Veche =

- Village
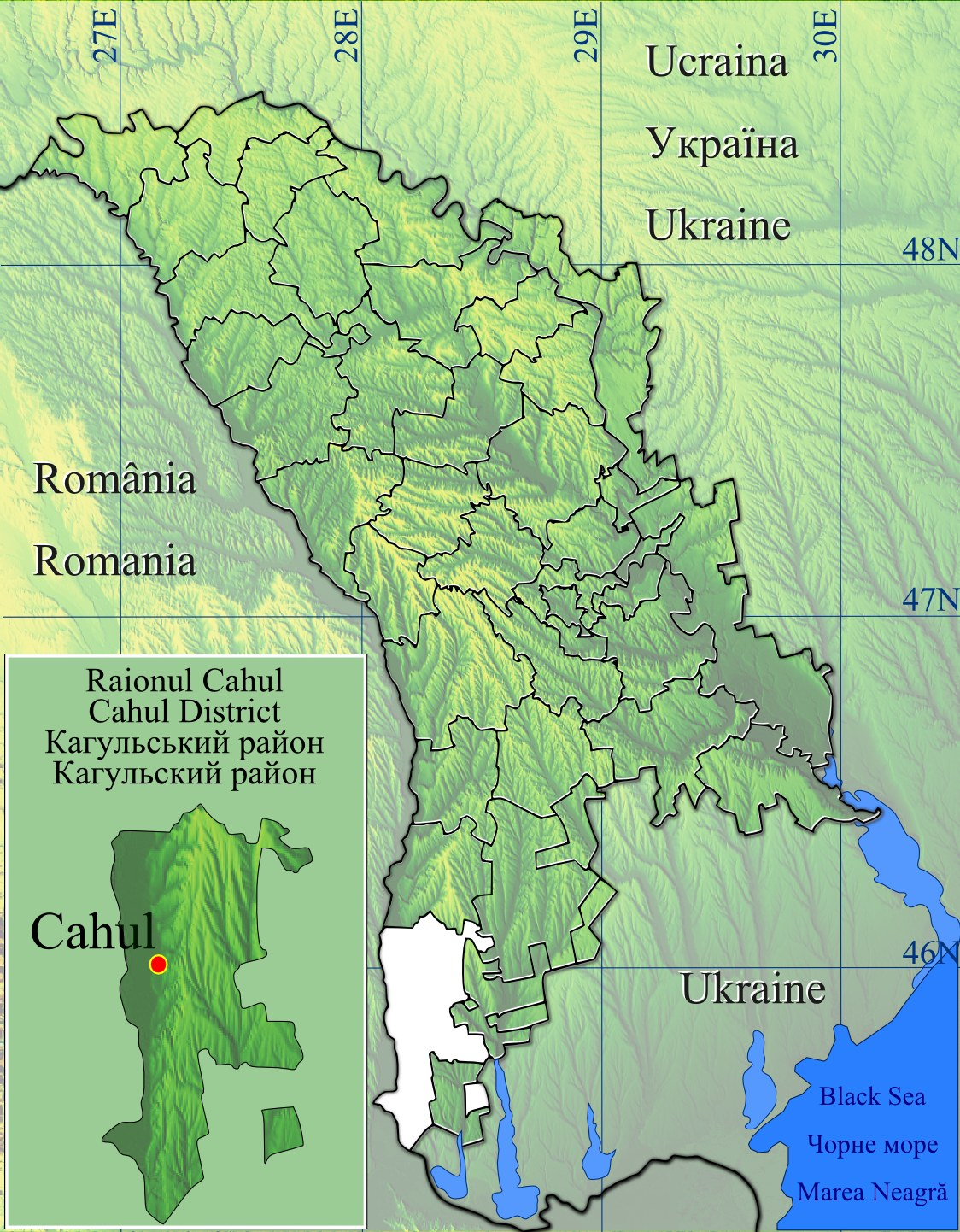
- Location within Cahul
- Coordinates: 45°50′45″N 28°11′41″E
- Country: Moldova

Government
  - Mayor: Miclauș Igor

Area
  - Total: 90 km^{2} (35 sq mi)

Population (2014 census)
  - Total: 5,099
- Time zone: UTC+2 (EET)
  - Summer (DST): UTC+3 (EEST)
- Postal code: MD-3918

Crihana Veche is a village in Cahul District, Moldova.

== Sport ==
The village has a club called FC Speranța Crihana Veche who plays in Cahul. The team ended the season with 63 points and has promoted to Division ”A” after receiving national license. Then in 2011–12, FC Speranța Crihana Veche runner-up the "A" Division and promoted to the highest tier of Moldovan football Moldovan National Division for 3 seasons.
