= Eugeniu Celeadnic =

Moldovan footballer

Personal information
- Date of birth: 9 October 1990 (age 36)
- Place of birth: Tiraspol, Moldova
- Height: 1.84 m (6 ft 0 in)
- Position: Defender

Senior career*
| Years | Team | Apps | (Gls) |
| 2009–2010 | Tiraspol | 6 | (0) |
| 2010–2011 | Sfântul Gheorghe | 33 | (0) |
| 2011–2012 | Academia Chișinău | 4 | (0) |
| 2012–2014 | Speranța Crihana Veche | 43 | (1) |
| 2014–2017 | Academia Chișinău | 57 | (2) |
| 2017 | Milsami Orhei | 3 | (0) |
| 2019–2023 | Foresta Suceava | 58 | (3) |
| 2023–2024 | Spartanii Sportul | ? | (?) |
| 2024– | Atletic Strășeni | 0 | (0) |
- * Club domestic league appearances and goals as of 09:26, 6 October 2023 (UTC)

Eugeniu Celeadnic (born 9 October 1990) is a Moldovan football defender.

== International career ==
Celeadnic was called up to the senior Moldova squad for a UEFA Euro 2016 qualifier against Russia in October 2015.

== Club statistics ==
- Total matches played in Moldavian First League: 146 matches - 3 goal
