= Georgi Karaneychev =

Bulgarian footballer

Personal information
- Full name: Georgi Ivanov Karaneychev
- Date of birth: 9 June 1988 (age 38)
- Place of birth: Haskovo, Bulgaria
- Height: 1.86 m (6 ft 1 in)
- Position: Forward

Team information
- Current team: Einherji
- Number: 9

Youth career
- Hebros Harmanli

Senior career*
Years	Team	Apps	(Gls)
2007	Chavdar Byala Slatina	13	(5)
2008	Svilengrad 1921	12	(2)
2008–2009	Lokomotiv Mezdra	17	(0)
2009–2010	Minyor Radnevo	12	(2)
2010	Ludogorets Razgrad	8	(0)
2011	Sliven 2000	9	(0)
2011–2012	Pirin Gotse Delchev	24	(5)
2012–2015	Tiraspol	63	(18)
2015	Kaisar	5	(0)
2016	Lokomotiv GO	4	(0)
2016–2017	Dacia Chișinău	10	(1)
2017	KF Fjarðabyggðar	17	(4)
2018	Strumska Slava	11	(0)
2018–	Einherji	5	(1)

International career
2008–2010	Bulgaria U21	1	(0)
- * Club domestic league appearances and goals as of 1 October 2018

Georgi Ivanov Karaneychev (Bulgarian: Георги Иванов Каранейчев; born 9 June 1988) is a Bulgarian footballer who plays as a forward for Einherji.

== Career ==
Karaneychev started to play football at FC Trayana Stara Zagora. After that he played for FC Hebros, Chavdar Byala Slatina and FC Svilengrad 1921.

He made his competitive debut for Loko Mezdra on 8 November 2008 against Lokomotiv Plovdiv in the twelfth round of the Bulgarian top division. A few days later Karaneychev made his debut for Bulgaria U21 in a friendly match against Romania U21.

In the summer of 2015, Karaneychev underwent a trial with Beroe.

On 12 May 2017, Karaneychev joined Icelandic club KF Fjarðabyggðar. In January 2018, he moved to Bulgarian Second League side Strumska Slava Radomir but left the club at the end of the 2017–18 season.
