= Alexandru Grab =

Moldovan footballer

Personal information
- Full name: Alexandru Grab
- Date of birth: 13 December 1977 (age 48)
- Place of birth: Bălți, Moldova
- Height: 1.76 m (5 ft 9 1/2 in)
- Position: Midfielder

Team information
- Current team: FC Olimpia
- Number: 7

Senior career*
Years	Team	Apps	(Gls)
2011–	FC Olimpia	44	(1)
- * Club domestic league appearances and goals as of 30 May 2014

Alexandru Grab (born 13 December 1977) is a Moldavian football midfielder who plays for FC Olimpia.

== Club statistics ==
- Total matches played in Moldavian First League: 44 matches - 1 goal
