= Ibrahima Camara (footballer, born 1992) =

Guinean footballer

Personal information
- Full name: Ibrahima Sory Camara
- Date of birth: 6 October 1992 (age 34)
- Place of birth: Conakry, Guinea
- Height: 1.82 m (6 ft 0 in)
- Position: Midfielder

Senior career*
Years	Team	Apps	(Gls)
2007–2009	Tiligul-Tiras Tiraspol		
2009–2013	Olimpia Bălți	99	(1)
2013	→ FC Tiraspol (loan)	2	(0)
2013–2015	Dacia Chișinău	42	(3)
2015	→ Dinamo-Auto Tiraspol (loan)	1	(0)
- * Club domestic league appearances and goals as of 17 January 2019

Ibrahima Sory ″Passy″ Camara (born 6 October 1992) is a Guinean professional footballer who plays as a midfielder.

At the age of 15, Camara signed with first league Moldovan team, Tiligul-Tiras Tiraspol, where he played two seasons.

In 2010, while he had a contract with Olimpia Bălți, he signed another contract with Academia Chișinău and began training with them. Then, Moldovan Football Federation decided that Camara was a player of Olimpia Bălți and banned Camara for six matchdays and fined him US$500.
