= FC Speranța Crihana Veche =

Moldovan football club

Speranța Crihana Veche
- Full name: Fotbal Club Speranța Crihana Veche
- Founded: 19 March 2009
- Dissolved: 2014
- Ground: Stadionul Raionul Atlant; Cahul, Moldova
- Capacity: 1,000
- 2013–14: Divizia Naţională, 11th of 12 (withdrew)
Home colours	Away colours

FC Speranța Crihana Veche was a Moldovan football club based in Crihana Veche, Cahul, Moldova. They spent two seasons in the Divizia Națională, the top division of Moldovan football. The club was dissolved in 2014.

== History ==
In the 2010–2011 season in League team started the season ending position 10 with 34 points to his credit. That season the team had a successful start and later for half the season to lose a bit of ambition Newcomer. The following season, the team showed a more stable development of experienced players coming due and ambitious National Division. Hope fought until the last step for getting first place but finally gave primacy Sheriff Tiraspol 2. The team ended the season with 63 points and has promoted to Division ”A” after receiving national license. Then in 2011–12, FC Speranța Crihana Veche runner-up the "A" Division and promoted to the highest tier of Moldovan football Moldovan National Division.

== Honours ==
- Divizia A

Runners-up (1): 2011–12

== Managers ==
- (Moldova) Igor Ursachi (July 8, 2012 – Oct 23, 2012)
- (Moldova) Veaceslav Rusnac (Oct 23, 2012 – Nov 6, 2012)
- (Moldova) Oleg Bejenari (Nov 8, 2012 – June 30, 2013)
- (Moldova) Serghei Dubrovin (Aug 2, 2013 – Aug 27, 2013)
- (Romania) Sorin Bucuroaia (Aug 27, 2013 – Oct 7, 2013)
- (Moldova) Serghei Dubrovin (Oct 7, 2013–?)

== List of seasons ==
Season	League									Cup	Ref
Season	Division	Pos	Pld	W	D	L	GF	GA	Pts	Cup	Ref
2008–09	Divizia B (South)	8th	24	8	3	13	38	54	27	—N/a	
2009–10	Divizia B (South)	↑ 3rd	26	19	3	4	62	29	60	—N/a	
2010–11	Divizia A	10th	28	9	7	12	32	45	34	Second round	
2011–12	Divizia A	↑ 2nd	30	20	6	4	52	23	66	First round	
2012–13	Divizia Națională	11th	33	4	7	22	35	70	19	Round of 16	
2013–14	Divizia Națională	↓ 11th	33	4	2	27	20	91	11 (Note: Speranța were deducted 3 points in the 2013–14 season)	Second round	
