= FC Rapid Ghidighici =

Rapid Ghidighici
- Full name: Fotbal Club Rapid Ghidighici
- Founded: 1992
- Dissolved: 2014
- Ground: Ghidighici
- Capacity: 1,500
- 2013–14: Divizia Naţională, 9th of 12 (withdrew)
Home colours	Away colours

FC Rapid Ghidighici was a Moldovan football club based in Ghidighici, Chişinău, Moldova. They played in the Divizia Naţională, the top division in Moldovan football.

== History ==
During the 2006–07 season of the Divizia A, the club, then known as CSCA Chişinău, won promotion to the Divizia Naţională by coming in third. The newly promoted club then become known as CSCA-Steaua Chişinău. In the summer of 2008, the club merged with an club then known as FC Rapid Ghidighici to create CSCA–Rapid Chişinău. Before the 2011/12 season, they changed their name to FC Rapid Ghidighici. They played until the autumn pause of the 2013/14 season of the First division of Moldova . After that, The Moldovan Football Federation Suspended Rapid Ghidighici from all football activities for 3 years.

== Previous names ==
- 1992 – foundation as CSA Victoria Cahul
- 1998 – renamed CSA Victoria Chișinău
- 2000 – renamed CSA ABV Chișinău
- 2001 – renamed CSA Buiucani Chișinău
- 2002 – renamed FCA Victoria Chișinău
- 2005 – renamed CSCA-Agro Stauceni
- 2006 – renamed CSCA Chișinău
- 2007 – renamed CSCA-Steaua Chișinău
- 2008 – merger with FC Rapid Ghidigici to CSCA-Rapid Chișinău
- 2011 – renamed FC Rapid Ghidighici

== Managers ==
- (Moldova) Victor Afanasiev (2005–0?)
- (Moldova) Igor Oprea
- (Ukraine) Pavlo Irychuk (2006–07)
- (Moldova) Vlad Goian (July 1, 2007 – Dec 31, 2007)
- (Ukraine) Pavlo Irychuk (2008)
- (Moldova) Serghei Dubrovin (2008–0?)
- (Ukraine) Pavlo Irychuk (200?–09)
- (Moldova) Sergiu Secu (interim) (Aug 25, 2009 – Sept 30, 2009)
- (Romania) Spiridon Niculescu (2009–10)
- (Ukraine) Pavlo Irychuk (2010)
- (Moldova) Sergiu Sârbu (2010)
- (Moldova) Eugen Marcoci (2010)
- (Ukraine) Pavlo Irychuk (2010)
- (Moldova) Sergiu Sârbu (2010)
- (Moldova) Petru Efros (2010)
- (Moldova) Serghei Carmanov (2010)
- (Ukraine) Pavlo Irychuk (2011)
- (Moldova) Sergiu Secu (July 1, 2011 – March 27, 2012)
- (Romania) Ionel Ganea (March 26, 2012 – April 15, 2012)
- (Ukraine) Pavlo Irychuk (2012)
- (Moldova) Sergiu Secu (interim) (April 19, 2012 – June 30, 2012)
- (Moldova) Iurie Osipenco (April 15, 2012 – Dec 31, 2012)
- (Moldova) Sergiu Secu (Jan 1, 2013 – April 9, 2013)
- (Ukraine) Volodymyr Lyuty (April 10, 2013 – Sept 12, 2013)
- (Moldova) Sergiu Secu (Sept 13, 2013 – Oct 20, 2013)

== Honours ==
- Divizia A
  - Winners (1): 2003–04
- Divizia B
  - Winners (1): 1993–94
- Moldovan Cup
  - Runner-up (1): 2011–12
