= FC Veris Chișinău =

Veris Chișinău
- Full name: Football Club Veris Chișinău
- Founded: 26 May 2011
- Dissolved: 5 December 2014
- Ground: Stadionul Sîngerei; Sîngerei, Moldova
- Capacity: 1,500
- Website: fcveris.md (archived)
Home colours	Away colours

FC Veris was a Moldovan football club based in Chișinău, Moldova. They played in the Moldovan "B" Division, the third division in Moldovan football. In 2012, FC Veris won Divizia B, and were promoted. They won their first season in the Moldovan "A" Division and gained promotion to the highest tier of football in Moldova which is the Moldovan National Division. Veris played one and a half season in the top division before withdrawing in December 2014.

== History ==
In spring 2011, youths from the village Drăgăneşti, Singerei, petitioned the businessman Vladimir Niculae with a request to create a football club, to attend district championship.

On 5 December 2014, Veris withdrew from all competitions after a 1–0 loss against Sheriff Tiraspol in the Moldovan Cup. The president of the club was dissatisfied with the refereeing in the match, as he felt Veris should have been given at least two penalties. The club was in first place in the Moldovan National Division at the time of the withdrawal.

== Kit manufacturers and shirt sponsors ==
Years	Kit manufacturer	Sponsor
2011–12	Legea	None
2012–13	Legea	Moldcell
2013–	Joma	Moldcell

== Past seasons ==
Season	League	Place	W	D	L	GF	GA	Pts	Moldovan Cup	Top scorer (league)
2011–12	Moldovan "B" Division (North) (III)	1	20	0	0	84	2	74	Second round	
2012–13	Moldovan "A" Division (II)	1	24	2	2	103	5	74	Runner-up	(Moldova) Viorel Frunză – 30
2013–14	Moldovan National Division	3	21	8	4	74	25	71	Quarter-finals	(Moldova) Viorel Frunză – 18
Green marks a season followed by promotion, red a season followed by relegation.

== European record ==
Season	Competition	Round	Club	Home	Away	Aggregate
2014–15	UEFA Europa League	1Q	(Bulgaria) Litex Lovech	0–0	0–3	0–3

Notes

- 1Q: First qualifying round

== Honours ==
- Moldovan Cup

Runners-up: 2012–13

- Divizia A

Winners: 2012–13

- Divizia B

Winners: 2011–12

== Managers ==
- (Moldova) Igor Ursachi (1 July 2011 – 4 May 2012)
- (Romania) Dănuț Oprea (12 January 2013 – 28 October 2013)
- (Russia) Igor Dobrovolski (30 October 2013 – 9 March 2014)
- (Moldova) Lilian Popescu (10 March 2014 – 5 December 2014)
