= 2014–15 FC Sheriff Tiraspol season =

Sheriff Tiraspol
2014–15 season
- Chairman: Viktor Gushan
- Manager: Veaceslav Rusnac (until 15 August); Zoran Zekić (from 15 August)
- Stadium: Sheriff Stadium
- Divizia Naţională: 3rd
- Moldovan Cup: Winners
- Moldovan Super Cup: Runners-up
- Champions League: Third qualifying round
- Europa League: Play-off round
- Top goalscorer: League: Ricardinho (19); All: Ricardinho (22)
Home colours	Away colours

The 2014–15 season was FC Sheriff Tiraspol's 18th season, and their 17th in the Divizia Naţională, the top-flight of Moldovan football.

== Squad ==
As of match played 24 May 2015

No.	Name	Nationality	Position	Date of birth (age)	Signed from	Signed in	Contract ends	Apps.	Goals
Goalkeepers
1	Serghei Pașcenco	(Moldova)	GK	18 December 1982 (aged 32)	Malavan	2014			
25	Sergiu Juric	(Moldova)	GK	3 March 1984 (aged 31)	Veris Chișinău	2014			
32	Matías Degra	(Argentina)	GK	18 June 1983 (aged 31)	Paços de Ferreira	2014		10	0
Defenders
15	Marcel Metoua	(Ivory Coast)	DF	15 November 1988 (aged 26)	Banat Zrenjanin	2011		133	10
17	Artiom Rozgoniuc	(Moldova)	DF	1 October 1995 (aged 19)	Trainee	2013		3	0
19	Serghei Svinarenco	(Moldova)	DF	18 September 1996 (aged 19)	Trainee	2014		3	0
21	Maxim Potîrniche	(Moldova)	DF	13 June 1989 (aged 25)	Zimbru Chișinău	2015		7	0
22	Amer Dupovac	(Bosnia and Herzegovina)	DF	29 May 1991 (aged 23)	Sarajevo	2015		11	1
30	Andrei Mureşan	(Romania)	DF	1 August 1985 (aged 29)	Astra Giurgiu	2015		25	2
33	Valeriu Macrițchii	(Moldova)	DF	13 February 1996 (aged 19)	Trainee	2013		35	2
55	Mateo Sušić	(Bosnia and Herzegovina)	DF	18 November 1990 (aged 24)	CFR Cluj	2015		13	0
Midfielders
8	Radu Gînsari	(Moldova)	MF	10 December 1991 (aged 23)	Zimbru Chișinău	2014		23	7
10	Thiago Galvão	(Brazil)	MF	24 August 1989 (aged 25)	Sloboda Užice	2014		31	1
11	Ricardinho	(Brazil)	MF	4 September 1989 (aged 25)	Lechia Gdańsk	2013		76	33
14	Wilfried Balima	(Burkina Faso)	MF	20 March 1985 (aged 30)	US Ouagadougou	2005			
16	Vadim Paireli	(Moldova)	MF	8 November 1995 (aged 19)	Trainee	2013		61	6
18	Leonel Olímpio	(Brazil)	MF	7 July 1982 (aged 32)	Vitória de Guimarães	2014		26	3
20	Cadú	(Brazil)	MF	31 August 1986 (aged 28)	Red Star Belgrade	2013		66	12
23	Ernandes	(Brazil)	MF	11 November 1987 (aged 27)	Atlético Goianiense	2014		35	1
24	Dmitri Semirov	(Moldova)	MF	27 December 1995 (aged 19)	Trainee	2012		9	1
26	Aitor Monroy	(Spain)	MF	18 October 1987 (aged 27)	CFR Cluj	2015		12	0
Forwards
7	Maxim Antoniuc	(Moldova)	FW	15 January 1991 (aged 24)	Veris Chișinău	2014		15	2
9	Juninho Potiguar	(Brazil)	FW	22 February 1990 (aged 25)	Icasa	2014		44	23
29	Ismail Isa	(Bulgaria)	FW	26 June 1989 (aged 25)	Litex Lovech	2013		71	21
88	Eugeniu Rebenja	(Moldova)	FW	5 March 1995 (aged 20)	loan from Tiraspol	2014		8	1
89	Maxim Iurcu	(Moldova)	FW	1 February 1993 (aged 22)	Dinamo-Auto Tiraspol	2014		11	3
Players away on loan
12	Dmitri Stajila	(Moldova)	GK	2 August 1991 (aged 23)	Trainee	2007			
73	Andrei Macrițchii	(Moldova)	FW	13 February 1996 (aged 19)	Trainee	2013		1	0
91	Serghei Gheorghiev	(Moldova)	MF	20 October 1991 (aged 23)	Trainee	2014			
Left during the season
17	Joãozinho	(Portugal)	DF	2 July 1989 (aged 25)	loan from Braga	2014		7	0
18	Fred Benson	(Netherlands)	FW	10 April 1984 (aged 31)	PEC Zwolle	2014		12	4
21	Elkin Blanco	(Colombia)	MF	5 September 1989 (aged 25)	loan from Millonarios	2014		9	0
22	Djibril Paye	(Guinea)	DF	26 February 1990 (aged 25)		2008			
22	Igor Bondarenco	(Moldova)	DF		Trainee	2014		1	0
26	Miral Samardžić	(Slovenia)	DF	17 February 1987 (aged 28)	Maribor	2010			
88	Ligger	(Brazil)	DF	18 May 1988 (aged 27)	loan from Oeste	2014		14	0
90	Luvannor	(Moldova)	FW	19 May 1990 (aged 25)	Morrinhos	2011		109	47

=== Out on loan ===
Note: Flags indicate national team as defined under FIFA eligibility rules; some limited exceptions apply. Players may hold more than one non-FIFA nationality.

No. / Pos. / Nation / Player; 12 / GK / MDA / Dmitri Stajila (at Kukësi)	No. / Pos. / Nation / Player; 91 / MF / MDA / Serghei Gheorghiev (at Navbahor Namangan)

== Transfers ==
=== In ===
Date	Position	Nationality	Name	From	Fee	Ref.
17 June 2014	MF	(Moldova)	Radu Gînsari	Zimbru Chișinău	Undisclosed	
20 June 2014	FW	(Netherlands)	Fred Benson	PEC Zwolle	Undisclosed	
24 June 2014	MF	(Romania)	Andrei Mureșan	Astra Giurgiu	Undisclosed	
24 June 2014	FW	(Moldova)	Maxim Iurcu	Dinamo-Auto	Undisclosed	
26 June 2014	MF	(Moldova)	Serghei Gheorghiev	Tiraspol	Undisclosed	
26 June 2014	GK	(Moldova)	Serghei Pașcenco	Malavan	Undisclosed	
27 June 2014	MF	(Moldova)	Maxim Antoniuc	Veris Chișinău	Undisclosed	
30 June 2014	MF	(Brazil)	Leonel Olímpio	Vitória	Undisclosed	
2 July 2014	GK	(Argentina)	Matías Degra	Paços de Ferreira	Undisclosed	
3 July 2014	FW	(Brazil)	Tiago Galvão	Sloboda Užice	Undisclosed	
28 January 2015	DF	(Bosnia and Herzegovina)	Mateo Sušić	Cluj	Undisclosed	
7 February 2015	MF	(Spain)	Aitor Monroy	Cluj	Undisclosed	
12 February 2015	DF	(Bosnia and Herzegovina)	Amer Dupovac	Sarajevo	Undisclosed	
5 March 2015	DF	(Moldova)	Maxim Potîrniche	Zimbru Chișinău	Undisclosed	

=== Out ===
Date	Position	Nationality	Name	To	Fee	Ref.
16 June 2014	DF	(Serbia)	Tomislav Pajović	Hapoel Be'er Sheva	Undisclosed	
9 July 2014	DF	(Guinea)	Djibril Paye	Zulte Waregem	Undisclosed	
9 July 2014	MF	(Slovenia)	Miral Samardžić	Rijeka	Undisclosed	
10 August 2014	FW	(Moldova)	Luvannor	Al Shabab	Undisclosed	

=== Loans in ===
Date from	Position	Nationality	Name	From	Date to	Ref.
24 June 2014	DF	(Brazil)	Ligger	Oeste	17 December 2014	
2 July 2014	MF	(Colombia)	Elkin Blanco	Millonarios	21 January 2015	
22 July 2014	DF	(Portugal)	Joãozinho	Braga	2 September 2014	
15 January 2015	FW	(Moldova)	Eugeniu Rebenja	Tiraspol	End of Season	

=== Loans out ===
Date from	Position	Nationality	Name	To	Date to	Ref.
Summer 2014	MF	(Moldova)	Igor Dima	Saxan		
9 August 2014	MF	(Serbia)	Marko Stanojević	Simurq	31 May 2015	
29 August 2014	GK	(Moldova)	Dmitri Stajila	Dinamo-Auto	31 December 2014	
25 December 2014	GK	(Bulgaria)	Georgi Georgiev	Naft Masjed Soleyman	End of Season	
17 February 2015	GK	(Moldova)	Dmitri Stajila	Kukësi	17 August 2015	
19 February 2015	FW	(Moldova)	Artiom Puntus	Tiraspol	End of Season	
18 March 2015	MF	(Moldova)	Serghei Gheorghiev	Navbahor Namangan	End of Season	

=== Released ===
Date	Position	Nationality	Name	Joined	Date
Summer 2014	MF	(Moldova)	Valentin Bîrdan	Tiraspol	
Summer 2014	MF	(Moldova)	Veaceslav Lisa	Saxan	
Summer 2014	FW	(Brazil)	Jhulliam	Indy Eleven	26 August 2014
11 June 2014	DF	(Spain)	Melli	Ergotelis	
18 June 2014	MF	(Moldova)	Valentin Furdui	Kaisar	
21 January 2015	DF	(Croatia)	Petar Lela	Slaven Belupo	
23 January 2015	FW	(Netherlands)	Fred Benson	Rapid București	
17 February 2015	FW	(Brazil)	Klysman	Santa Cruz	

== Competitions ==
=== Moldovan Super Cup ===
27 June 2014	Zimbru Chișinău	1–1 (4–3 p)	Sheriff Tiraspol	Tiraspol
19:00 EEST (UTC+3)	A.S. Grosu 45+1'; Pavlyuchek (yellow card) 90'	Report	Gînsari 45'; Gheorghiev (yellow card) 63'	Stadium: Sheriff Stadium; Attendance: 5,000; Referee: Gabriel Tupicica
	Penalties
	Dedov (penalty missed); Erhan (penalty scored); Anton (penalty missed); Vremea (penalty scored); Pavlyuchek (penalty missed); Klimovich (penalty scored); Bogdan (penalty scored)		(penalty scored) Isa; (penalty missed) Paye; (penalty missed) Samardžić; (penalty missed) Metoua; (penalty scored) Ricardinho; (penalty scored) Benson; (penalty missed) Luvannor

=== Divizia Națională ===
==== Results summary ====
Overall								Home						Away					
Pld	W	D	L	GF	GA	GD	Pts	W	D	L	GF	GA	GD	W	D	L	GF	GA	GD
24	17	4	3	56	16	+40	55	9	1	2	38	9	+29	8	3	1	18	7	+11

Last updated: 20 May 2015.
Source: Soccerway

==== Results ====
25 July 2014 1	Sheriff Tiraspol	2–1	Tiraspol	Tiraspol
19:00 EEST (UTC+3)	Potiguar 41'; Galvão 44'; Gînsari (yellow card) 55'	Report	Sydorenko (yellow card) 49'; Ovseanicov 71'; Smyrnov (yellow card) 82'; Rață (yellow card) 90+3'	Stadium: Sheriff Stadium; Attendance: 1,100; Referee: Iurie Covtun

2 August 2014 2	Saxan Gagauz Yeri	1–1	Sheriff Tiraspol	Ceadîr-Lunga
18:00 EEST (UTC+3)	K.Kouassi (yellow card) 52'; C.Calmîş (yellow card) 55'; A.Popovici 90+4'	Report	Balima 49'; Potiguar (yellow card) 61'	Stadium: Ceadîr-Lunga Stadium; Attendance: 4,000; Referee: Andrei Cojocaru

10 August 2014 3	Sheriff Tiraspol	1–2	Dacia Chișinău	Tiraspol
19:00 EEST (UTC+3)	Gînsari (yellow card) 39'; Metoua 59'	Report	Krkotić 13' (pen.), 70'; Barakhoyev (yellow card) 15'; Zastavnyi (yellow card) 81'; Golubović (yellow card) 83'	Stadium: Sheriff Stadium; Attendance: 1,000; Referee: Veaceslav Banari

16 August 2014 4	Costuleni	Cancelled	Sheriff Tiraspol	Chișcăreni
17:00 EEST (UTC+3)		Report		Stadium: Stadionul Sătesc; Attendance: 250; Referee: Alexandr Tean

24 August 2014 5	Sheriff Tiraspol	0–0	Milsami	Tiraspol
19:00 EEST (UTC+3)		Report	Antoniuc (yellow card) 24'; Slivca (yellow card) 67'; Cojocari (yellow card) 77'; Gheți (yellow card) 88'	Stadium: Sheriff Stadium; Attendance: 480; Referee: Petru Stoianov

13 September 2014 7	Dinamo-Auto	1–2	Sheriff Tiraspol	Tîrnauca
16:00 EEST (UTC+3)	Mandrîcenco 17'; V.Jancov (yellow card) 21'; E.Ceaban (yellow card) 90'	Report	Potiguar 27', 42'; Gheorghiev (yellow card) 53'	Stadium: Dinamo-Auto Stadium; Attendance: 250; Referee: Victor Gheciu

20 September 2014 8	Sheriff Tiraspol	4–0	Zaria Bălți	Tiraspol
18:00 EEST (UTC+3)	Ricardinho 15', 45+1'; Gheorghiev (yellow card) 26'; Potiguar (yellow card) 37'; Paireli 49', 59'	Report	Marina (yellow card) 45+1'; R.Rogac (yellow card) 52'	Stadium: Sheriff Stadium; Attendance: 500; Referee: Ruslan Muntean

27 September 2014 9	Zimbru Chișinău	0–1	Sheriff Tiraspol	Chișinău
19:00 EEST (UTC+3)	Pavlyuchek (yellow card) 25'; Vremea (yellow card) 43'	Report	Mureşan 45'	Stadium: Zimbru Stadium; Attendance: 3,800; Referee: Petru Stoianov

4 October 2014 10	Sheriff Tiraspol	3–0	Academia Chișinău	Tiraspol
17:00 EEST (UTC+3)	Gînsari 22'; Ricardinho (yellow card) 53'; Balima 60'; Benson 70'	Report	Focşa (yellow card) 90'	Stadium: Sheriff Stadium; Attendance: 500; Referee: Victor Bugenko

18 October 2014 11	Veris Chișinău	Cancelled	Sheriff Tiraspol	Suruceni
15:00 EEST (UTC+3)		Report		Stadium: Suruceni Stadium; Attendance: 260; Referee: Alexandr Tean

25 October 2014 12	Tiraspol	2–4	Sheriff Tiraspol	Tiraspol
17:00 EEST (UTC+3)	Karaneychev (yellow card) 35'; I.Poiarcov 40'; Boghiu 59'	Report	Ricardinho 5', 38', 42'; Paireli (yellow card) 73'; Potiguar 90+1'	Stadium: Malaya Sportivnaya Arena; Attendance: 150; Referee: Ruslan Muntean

2 November 2014 13	Sheriff Tiraspol	4–0	Saxan Gagauz Yeri	Tiraspol
17:00 EET (UTC+2)	Paireli 54'; Ricardinho 72'; Gînsari 78'; Potiguar 90+2'	Report	C.Lungu (yellow card) 45'; Bacal (yellow card) 53'	Stadium: Sheriff Stadium; Attendance: 700; Referee: Gheorghe Malinovschii

9 November 2014 14	Dacia Chișinău	3–2	Sheriff Tiraspol	Speia
14:00 EET (UTC+2)	Leucă 24' (yellow card) 47'; Barakhoyev (yellow card) 50'; Zastavnyi 38' (yellow card) 51'; Bejan 79'	Report	Gînsari 14'; Ricardinho (yellow card) 80' (goal) 84'	Stadium: Stadionul Moldova; Attendance: 600; Referee: Petru Stoianov

22 November 2014 15	Sheriff Tiraspol	Cancelled	Costuleni	Tiraspol
14:00 EET (UTC+2)		Report		Stadium: Sheriff Stadium

29 November 2014 16	Milsami	0–0	Sheriff Tiraspol	Orhei
13:00 EET (UTC+2)	Andronic (yellow card) 1'; Iavorschi (yellow card) 4'; Gheți (yellow card) 87'	Report	Blanco (yellow card) 16'; Paireli (yellow card) 24'; V.Macrițchii (yellow card) 57'; Potiguar (yellow card) 62'	Stadium: CSR Orhei; Attendance: 1,450; Referee: Alexandr Tean

13 December 2014 18	Sheriff Tiraspol	7–2	Dinamo-Auto	Tiraspol
15:00 EET (UTC+2)	Potiguar 1'; Isa (yellow card) 23' (goal) 32'; Ricardinho 41', 53', 63', 64'; Antoniuc 79'	Report	Mudrac (yellow card) 16'; Mihaliov 44'; A.Apostol (yellow card) 55'; V.Jancov (yellow card) 60'; A.Jularji 77'	Stadium: Krytyj futbolnyj Manesh; Attendance: 1,000; Referee: Dmitrii Muntean

28 February 2015 19	Zaria Bălți	0–1	Sheriff Tiraspol	Vadul lui Vodă
13:00 EET (UTC+2)	R.Rogac (yellow card) 7'; V.Ghenaitis (yellow card) 44'; Cheptenari (yellow card) 47'; A.Bezimov (yellow card) 62'; Grijuc (yellow card) 87'	Report	Ricardinho 8'; Rebenja (yellow card) 89'	Stadium: Teren 2 CPSN Sintetic; Attendance: 100; Referee: Alexandr Tean

4 March 2015 20	Sheriff Tiraspol	3–0	Zimbru Chișinău	Tiraspol
18:00 EET (UTC+2)	Cadú 3'; Ricardinho 18' (pen.); Dupovac 44'; V.Macrițchii (yellow card) 71'	Report	Vremea (yellow card) 33'; Rusu (yellow card) 72'	Stadium: Krytyj futbolnyj Manesh; Attendance: 2,800; Referee: Petru Stoianov

8 March 2015 21	Academia Chișinău	0–3	Sheriff Tiraspol	Chișinău
14:00 EET (UTC+2)	Cheptine (yellow card) 36'; Celeadnic (yellow card) 49' (yellow-red card) 71'	Report	I.Sandu 1' (o.g.); Olímpio (yellow card) 27'; Ricardinho 45+1'; Cadú (yellow card) 47'; Ernandes 77'	Stadium: Stadionul Buiucani; Attendance: 400; Referee: Iurie Rochin

14 March 2015 22	Sheriff Tiraspol	Cancelled	Veris Chișinău	Tiraspol
17:00 EET (UTC+2)		Report		Stadium: Sheriff Stadium

21 March 2015 23	Sheriff Tiraspol	6–0	Zaria Bălți	Tiraspol
17:00 EET (UTC+2)	Ricardinho 5', 51' (yellow card) 78'; Cadú 10' (yellow card) 38'; Gînsari 60'; Potiguar 73', 77'	Report	Grijuc (yellow card) 12'; I.Carandaşov (yellow card) 36'	Stadium: Malaya Sportivnaya Arena; Attendance: 800; Referee: Andrei Ceban

4 April 2015 24	Academia Chișinău	0–2	Sheriff Tiraspol	Chișinău
16:00 EEST (UTC+3)		Report	Iurcu 49', 55'; Ricardinho (yellow card) 59'	Stadium: Stadionul Buiucani; Attendance: 300; Referee: Ruslan Muntean

11 April 2015 25	Sheriff Tiraspol	2–3	Milsami	Tiraspol
18:00 EEST (UTC+3)	Olímpio (yellow card) 28' (goal) 80' (pen.); Gînsari 49'	Report	Racu 4'; Rhaili (yellow card) 7' (goal) 10'; Cojocari 53'; Bud (yellow card) 88'	Stadium: Malaya Sportivnaya Arena; Attendance: 2,100; Referee: Gheorghe Malinovschii

17 April 2015 26	Dacia Chișinău	0–0	Sheriff Tiraspol	Speia
16:00 EEST (UTC+3)	Zastavnyi (yellow card) 13'	Report	Dupovac (yellow card) 44'; Cadú (yellow card) 72' (yellow-red card) 90+3'; Rebenja (yellow card) 73'	Stadium: Stadionul Moldova; Attendance: 500; Referee: Viorel Găina

3 May 2015 28	Sheriff Tiraspol	4–0	Tiraspol	Tiraspol
18:00 EEST (UTC+3)	Ricardinho 21', 62'; Olímpio 57' (pen.); Antoniuc 75'; Potiguar (yellow card) 82'	Report	Cakić (yellow card) 56'	Stadium: Malaya Sportivnaya Arena; Attendance: 1,500; Referee: Andrei Ceban

9 May 2015 29	Saxan Gagauz Yeri	0–1	Sheriff Tiraspol	Ceadîr-Lunga
17:00 EEST (UTC+3)	Bamba (yellow card) 50'; M.Kone (yellow card) 67'; C.Calmîş (yellow card) 78'; L.Dao (yellow card) 90+1'	Report	Ricardinho (yellow card) 44'; V.Macrițchii (yellow card) 86'; Rebenja 90+3'	Stadium: Ceadîr-Lunga Stadium; Attendance: 2,500; Referee: Victor Bugenko

15 May 2015 30	Sheriff Tiraspol	2–1	Zimbru Chișinău	Tiraspol
18:00 EEST (UTC+3)	Paireli 5'; Cadú 51'; Metoua (red card) 64'; S.Svinarenko (yellow card) 85'	Report	Vremea 8'; Belevschi (yellow card) 20'; Onică (yellow card) 64'	Stadium: Sheriff Stadium; Attendance: 2,500; Referee: Victor Gheciu

20 May 2015 31	Dinamo-Auto	0–1	Sheriff Tiraspol	Tîrnauca
18:00 EEST (UTC+3)	Focșa (yellow card) 6'; Ilescu (yellow card) 56'; A.Jularji (yellow card) 79'	Report	Ricardinho 20'; Balima (yellow card) 73'	Stadium: Dinamo-Auto Stadium; Attendance: 150; Referee: Viorel Găina

==== League table ====
Pos	Team	Pld	W	D	L	GF	GA	GD	Pts	Qualification
1	Milsami Orhei (C)	24	17	4	3	50	15	+35	55	Qualification for the Champions League second qualifying round
2	Dacia Chișinău	24	17	4	3	48	13	+35	55	Qualification for the Europa League first qualifying round
3	Sheriff Tiraspol	24	17	4	3	56	16	+40	55	Qualification for the Europa League first qualifying round
4	Tiraspol	24	14	2	8	49	28	+21	44	Team was dissolved after the season (Note: Tiraspol, the fourth-placed team, would have qualified for the Europa League first qualifying round, but were dissolved at the end of the 2014–15 season. As a result, the berth was given to Saxan, the fifth-placed team of the league.)
5	Saxan Ceadîr-Lunga	24	8	6	10	20	30	−10	30	Qualification for the Europa League first qualifying round

Source: Moldovan Football Federation
Rules for classification: 1st points; 2nd head-to-head points; 3rd head-to-head goal difference; 4th head-to-head goals scored; 5th goal difference; 6th number of goals scored; 7th Fair Play competition
(C) Champions

=== Moldovan Cup ===
29 October 2014 Third Round	Academia Chișinău	0–4	Sheriff Tiraspol	Vadul lui Vodă
13:00 EET (UTC+2)	D.Bogdan (yellow card) 24'; V.Zlatan (yellow card) 26'	Report	Gînsari 48'; Ricardinho (yellow card) 70' (goal) 86'; V.Macrițchii (yellow card) 75'; D.Semirov 76'; Benson 78'	Stadium: Stadionul CPSM

3 December 2014 Quarterfinal	Veris	0–1 (a.e.t.)	Sheriff Tiraspol	Chișinău
12:00 EET (UTC+2)	Bogdanović (yellow card) 81'; Frunză (yellow card) 95'	Report	Paireli (yellow card) 102'; Benson 117'	Stadium: CSCT Buiucani Stadium; Attendance: 350; Referee: Gheorghe Malinovschii

29 April 2015 Semifinal	Sheriff Tiraspol	3–0	Milsami Orhei	Tiraspol
18:00 EEST (UTC+3)	Isa 24'; Pașcenco (red card) 45'; Paireli (yellow card) 62'; Ricardinho 70'; Olímpio 79'	Report	Surdu (yellow card) 21'; Cojocari (yellow card) 34'; Rhaili (yellow card) 44' (yellow-red card) 44'	Stadium: Sheriff Stadium; Attendance: 2,650; Referee: Alexandru Tian

24 May 2015 Final	Sheriff Tiraspol	3–2 (a.e.t.)	Dacia Chişinău	Chișinău
20:00 EEST (UTC+3)	Potiguar 9'; Iurcu 52'; Isa 109' (yellow card) 110'	Report	Juric 66' (o.g.); Leucă 90+4' (yellow card) 90+4'; Barakhoyev (yellow card) 92'; Posmac (yellow card) 98'	Stadium: Zimbru Stadium; Attendance: 5,328; Referee: Oliver Drachta

=== UEFA Champions League ===
==== Qualifying rounds ====
15 July 2014 Second qualifying round 1st leg	Sheriff Tiraspol (Moldova)	2–0	(Montenegro) Sutjeska Nikšić	Tiraspol, Moldova
20:00 EEST (UTC+3)	Luvannor (yellow card) 28'; Metoua (yellow card) 30'; Gînsari (yellow card) 69'; Mureșan 71'; Isa 87'	Report	Jovović (yellow card) 36'; Ognjanović (yellow card) 69'; M.Krivokapić (yellow card) 90+4'	Stadium: Sheriff Stadium; Attendance: 6,351; Referee: Clayton Pisani (Malta)

22 July 2014 Second qualifying round 2nd leg	Sutjeska Nikšić (Montenegro)	0–3 (0–5 agg.)	(Moldova) Sheriff Tiraspol	Nikšić, Montenegro
18:30 EEST (UTC+3)	Ognjanović (yellow card) 10'; Vujović (red card) 10'; Jovović (yellow card) 15'; Nikolić (yellow card) 90+2'	Report	Benson 5'; Luvannor 35'; Isa 54'	Stadium: Stadion kraj Bistrice; Attendance: 1,450; Referee: Alexander Harkam (Austria)

29 July 2014 Third qualifying round 1st leg	Slovan Bratislava (Slovakia)	2–1	(Moldova) Sheriff Tiraspol	Bratislava, Slovakia
21:15 EEST (UTC+3)	Žofčák 42' (pen.); Lásik (red card) 61'; Mészáros 85'; Perniš (yellow card) 90+1'	Report	Blanco (yellow card) 41'; Ricardinho 74'; Gînsari (yellow card) 80'; Potiguar (yellow card) 88'	Stadium: Štadión Pasienky; Attendance: 6,711; Referee: Stephan Studer (Switzerland)

6 August 2014 Third qualifying round 2nd leg	Sheriff Tiraspol (Moldova)	2–0 (3–2 agg.)	(Slovakia) Slovan Bratislava	Tiraspol, Moldova
20:00 EEST (UTC+3)	Blanco (yellow card) 18' (yellow-red card) 56'	Report	Grendel (yellow card) 5'; Vittek (yellow card) 90+3'	Stadium: Sheriff Stadium; Attendance: 8,753; Referee: István Vad (Hungary)

=== UEFA Europa League ===
==== Qualifying rounds ====
21 August 2014 Playoff round 1st leg	Rijeka (Croatia)	1–0	(Moldova) Sheriff Tiraspol	Rijeka, Croatia
22:15 EEST (UTC+3)	Jajalo (yellow card) 23'; Leovac 85'; Sharbini (yellow card) 87'	Report	Galvão (yellow card) 29'; Isa (yellow card) 51'; Metoua (yellow card) 58'; Olímpio (yellow card) 82'	Stadium: Stadion Kantrida; Attendance: 9,020; Referee: Serge Gumienny (Belgium)

28 August 2014 Playoff round 2nd leg	Sheriff Tiraspol (Moldova)	0–3 (0–4 agg.)	(Croatia) Rijeka	Tiraspol, Moldova
20:00 EEST (UTC+3)	Potiguar (yellow card) 82'; Galvão (yellow card) 86'	Report	Ligger 29' (o.g.); Kramarić 44'; Moisés 61'; Zlomislić (yellow card) 84'	Stadium: Sheriff Stadium; Attendance: 4,853; Referee: Jorge Sousa (Portugal)

== Squad statistics ==
As of Match played 24 May 2015

=== Appearances and goals ===
No.	Pos	Nat	Player	Total		Divizia Națională		Moldovan Cup		Moldovan Super Cup		Champions League		Europa League	
No.	Pos	Nat	Player	Apps	Goals	Apps	Goals	Apps	Goals	Apps	Goals	Apps	Goals	Apps	Goals
1	GK	(Moldova) MDA	Serghei Pașcenco	21	0	18	0	2	0	1	0	0	0	0	0
7	FW	(Moldova) MDA	Maxim Antoniuc	15	2	10+3	2	2	0	0	0	0	0	0	0
8	MF	(Moldova) MDA	Radu Gînsari	23	7	9+6	5	1+1	1	1	1	3+1	0	0+1	0
9	FW	(Brazil) BRA	Juninho Potiguar	30	9	14+6	8	3+1	1	1	0	1+2	0	1+1	0
10	FW	(Brazil) BRA	Tiago Galvão	31	1	9+13	1	3+1	0	0	0	1+2	0	2	0
11	FW	(Brazil) BRA	Ricardinho	34	22	21+2	19	3+1	2	0+1	0	2+2	1	0+2	0
14	DF	(Burkina Faso) BFA	Wilfried Balima	21	2	12+5	2	0	0	0	0	2	0	2	0
15	DF	(Ivory Coast) CIV	Marcel Metoua	16	1	6+1	1	2	0	1	0	4	0	2	0
16	FW	(Moldova) MDA	Vadim Paireli	26	4	14+7	4	1+2	0	0+1	0	0	0	0+1	0
17	MF	(Moldova) MDA	Artiom Rozgoniuc	1	0	1	0	0	0	0	0	0	0	0	0
18	MF	(Brazil) BRA	Leonel Olímpio	26	3	18	2	3+1	1	0	0	0+2	0	2	0
19	DF	(Moldova) MDA	Serghei Svinarenco	3	0	1+1	0	1	0	0	0	0	0	0	0
20	MF	(Brazil) BRA	Cadú	28	3	13+4	3	4	0	1	0	4	0	2	0
21	DF	(Moldova) MDA	Maxim Potîrniche	7	0	5	0	2	0	0	0	0	0	0	0
22	DF	(Bosnia and Herzegovina) BIH	Amer Dupovac	11	1	9+1	1	0+1	0	0	0	0	0	0	0
23	DF	(Brazil) BRA	Ernandes	22	1	12+2	1	2+1	0	1	0	2	0	2	0
24	MF	(Moldova) MDA	Dmitri Semirov	8	1	0+6	0	2	1	0	0	0	0	0	0
25	GK	(Moldova) MDA	Sergiu Juric	7	0	4	0	2+1	0	0	0	0	0	0	0
26	MF	(Spain) ESP	Aitor Monroy	12	0	8+3	0	1	0	0	0	0	0	0	0
29	FW	(Bulgaria) BUL	Ismail Isa	29	5	9+9	1	2+2	2	0+1	0	3+1	2	1+1	0
30	MF	(Romania) ROU	Andrei Mureșan	25	2	13+3	1	2+1	0	0	0	4	1	2	0
32	GK	(Argentina) ARG	Matías Degra	10	0	4	0	0	0	0	0	4	0	2	0
33	DF	(Moldova) MDA	Valeriu Macrițchii	23	1	19+2	0	2	1	0	0	0	0	0	0
55	DF	(Bosnia and Herzegovina) BIH	Mateo Sušić	13	0	10+1	0	2	0	0	0	0	0	0	0
88	FW	(Moldova) MDA	Eugeniu Rebenja	8	1	3+5	1	0	0	0	0	0	0	0	0
89	FW	(Moldova) MDA	Maxim Iurcu	11	3	7+2	2	1+1	1	0	0	0	0	0	0
Players who left Sheriff Tiraspol during the season:
91	MF	(Moldova) MDA	Serghei Gheorghiev	10	0	6+3	0	0	0	1	0	0	0	0	0
Players who appeared for Sheriff Tiraspol no longer at the club:
17	DF	(Portugal) POR	Joãozinho	7	0	2+1	0	0	0	0	0	2	0	2	0
19	FW	(Netherlands) NED	Fred Benson	12	4	1+4	1	0+2	2	0+1	0	3+1	1	0	0
21	MF	(Colombia) COL	Elkin Blanco	9	0	3+2	0	0	0	0	0	4	0	0	0
22	DF	(Guinea) GUI	Djibril Paye	1	0	0	0	0	0	1	0	0	0	0	0
22	DF	(Moldova) MDA	Igor Bondarenco	1	0	1	0	0	0	0	0	0	0	0	0
26	DF	(Slovenia) SLO	Miral Samardžić	1	0	0	0	0	0	1	0	0	0	0	0
88	DF	(Brazil) BRA	Ligger	14	0	4+3	0	2	0	1	0	2	0	2	0
90	FW	(Moldova) MDA	Henrique Luvannor	6	1	0+1	0	0	0	1	0	3+1	1	0	0

=== Goal scorers ===
Place	Position	Nation	Number	Name	Divizia Națională	Moldovan Cup	Moldovan Super Cup	Champions League	Europa League	Total
1	FW	(Brazil)	11	Ricardinho	19	2	0	1	0	22
2	FW	(Brazil)	9	Juninho Potiguar	8	1	0	0	0	9
3	FW	(Moldova)	8	Radu Gînsari	5	1	1	0	0	7
4	FW	(Bulgaria)	29	Ismail Isa	1	2	0	2	0	5
5	FW	(Moldova)	16	Vadim Paireli	4	0	0	0	0	4
5	FW	(Netherlands)	19	Fred Benson	1	2	0	1	0	4
6	MF	(Brazil)	20	Cadú	3	0	0	0	0	3
6	MF	(Brazil)	18	Leonel Olímpio	2	1	0	0	0	3
6	FW	(Moldova)	89	Maxim Iurcu	2	1	0	0	0	3
9	DF	(Burkina Faso)	14	Wilfried Balima	2	0	0	0	0	2
9	FW	(Moldova)	7	Maxim Antoniuc	2	0	0	0	0	2
9	DF	(Romania)	30	Andrei Mureșan	1	0	0	1	0	2
12	DF	(Brazil)	23	Ernandes	1	0	0	0	0	1
12	FW	(Moldova)	88	Eugeniu Rebenja	1	0	0	0	0	1
12	MF	(Brazil)	10	Thiago Galvão	1	0	0	0	0	1
12	DF	(Ivory Coast)	15	Marcel Metoua	1	0	0	0	0	1
12	DF	(Bosnia and Herzegovina)	22	Amer Dupovac	1	0	0	0	0	1
12				Own goal	1	0	0	0	0	1
12	FW	(Brazil)	90	Henrique Luvannor	0	0	0	1	0	1
12	MF	(Moldova)	24	Dmitri Semirov	0	1	0	0	0	1
				TOTALS	56	11	1	6	0	74

=== Disciplinary record ===
Number	Nation	Position	Name	Divizia Națională		Moldovan Cup		Moldovan Super Cup		Champions League		Europa League		Total	
Number	Nation	Position	Name	Yellow card	Red card	Yellow card	Red card	Yellow card	Red card	Yellow card	Red card	Yellow card	Red card	Yellow card	Red card
1	(Moldova)	GK	Serghei Pașcenco	0	0	0	1	0	0	0	0	0	0	0	1
8	(Moldova)	FW	Radu Gînsari	2	0	0	0	0	0	2	0	0	0	4	0
9	(Brazil)	FW	Juninho Potiguar	4	0	0	0	0	0	1	0	1	0	5	0
10	(Brazil)	FW	Tiago Galvão	0	0	0	0	0	0	0	0	2	0	2	0
11	(Brazil)	FW	Ricardinho	5	0	1	0	0	0	0	0	0	0	6	0
14	(Burkina Faso)	DF	Wilfried Balima	1	0	0	0	0	0	0	0	0	0	1	0
15	(Ivory Coast)	DF	Marcel Metoua	0	1	0	0	0	0	1	0	1	0	2	1
16	(Moldova)	FW	Vadim Paireli	2	0	2	0	0	0	0	0	0	0	4	0
18	(Brazil)	MF	Leonel Olímpio	2	0	0	0	0	0	0	0	1	0	2	0
19	(Moldova)	DF	Serghei Svinarenco	1	0	0	0	0	0	0	0	0	0	1	0
20	(Brazil)	MF	Cadú	4	1	0	0	0	0	0	0	0	0	4	1
22	(Bosnia and Herzegovina)	DF	Amer Dupovac	1	0	0	0	0	0	0	0	0	0	1	0
29	(Bulgaria)	FW	Ismail Isa	1	0	1	0	0	0	0	0	1	0	3	0
33	(Moldova)	DF	Valeriu Macrițchii	3	0	1	0	0	0	0	0	0	0	4	0
Players away from Sheriff Tiraspol on loan:
91	(Moldova)	MF	Serghei Gheorghiev	2	0	0	0	1	0	0	0	0	0	3	0
Players who left Sheriff Tiraspol during the season:
21	(Colombia)	MF	Elkin Blanco	1	0	0	0	0	0	3	1	0	0	4	1
88	(Moldova)	FW	Eugeniu Rebenja	2	0	0	0	0	0	0	0	0	0	2	0
90	(Brazil)	FW	Luvannor	0	0	0	0	0	0	1	0	0	0	1	0
			TOTALS	29	2	5	1	1	0	8	1	6	0	49	4
