= 2014–15 Moldovan National Division =

Moldovan National Division
- Season: 2014–15
- Champions: Milsami
- Matches: 108
- Goals: 287 (2.66 per match)
- Top goalscorer: Ricardinho (19 goals)
- Biggest home win: Tiraspol 8–1 Dinamo-Auto; Dacia Chișinău 8–1 Academia Chișinău
- Biggest away win: Dinamo-Auto 0–5 Milsami
- Highest scoring: Tiraspol 8–1 Dinamo-Auto; Dacia Chișinău 8–1 Academia Chișinău
- Longest winning run: Milsami (7 games)
- Longest unbeaten run: Milsami (16 games)
- Longest losing run: Dinamo-Auto (13 games)
- Highest attendance: Saxan 4.000
- Lowest attendance: FC Academia Chișinău, Dinamo-Auto 50
- Average attendance: Saxan 2.300
- All statistics correct as of 22 May 2015.

The 2014–15 Moldovan National Division (Romanian: Divizia Națională) is the 24th season of top-tier football in Moldova. The competition began in July 2014 and ended in May 2015.

== Teams ==
=== Stadia and locations ===
Location of teams in National Division 2014–15

Club	Location	Stadium	Capacity
Academia Chișinău	Chișinău	Stadionul CPSN	1,000
FC Costuleni	Costuleni	Ghidighici Stadium	1,500
Dacia Chișinău	Chișinău	Stadionul Moldova (Speia)	8,550
Dinamo-Auto Tiraspol	Tiraspol	Dinamo-Auto Stadium	3,525
Milsami Orhei	Orhei	CSR Orhei	2,539
Zaria Bălți	Bălți	Olimpia Bălți Stadium	5,953
Saxan Gagauz Yeri	Ceadîr-Lunga	Ceadîr-Lunga Stadium	2,000
Sheriff Tiraspol	Tiraspol	Sheriff Stadium	13,460
FC Tiraspol	Tiraspol	Sheriff Stadium	13,460
Veris Chișinău	Chișinău	CSR Orhei	2,539
Zimbru Chișinău	Chișinău	Zimbru Stadium	10,600

=== Personnel and sponsorship ===
Team	Home city	Head coach	Kit manufacturer	Shirt sponsor
Academia	Chișinău	(Moldova) Vladimir Vusatîi	Macron	
Costuleni	Costuleni	(Romania) Laurențiu Tudor	Joma	Cavio
Dacia	Chișinău	(Russia) Igor Dobrovolski	Puma	-
Dinamo-Auto	Tiraspol	(Moldova) Igor Negrescu	Umbro	Ipotecniy
Milsami	Orhei	(Moldova) Iurie Osipenco	Joma	Dufremol
Zaria	Bălți	(Moldova) Serghei Dubrovin	Acerbis	Simtravel
Saxan Ceadîr-Lunga	Ceadîr-Lunga	(Moldova) Ivan Burduniuc	Kelme	
Sheriff	Tiraspol	(Croatia) Zoran Zekić	Adidas	IDC
Tiraspol	Tiraspol	(Moldova) Lilian Popescu	Adidas	Tirotex
Veris	Chișinău	(Moldova) Lilian Popescu	Joma	Moldcell
Zimbru	Chișinău	(Moldova) Veaceslav Rusnac	Puma	Obolon

=== Managerial changes ===
Team	Outgoing manager	Manner of departure	Date of vacancy	Position in table	Incoming manager	Date of appointment
Academia Chișinău	(Moldova) Valeriu Catană	End of Contract	25 July 2014	Pre-season	(Moldova) Vladimir Vusatîi	25 July 2014
Sheriff	(Moldova) Veaceslav Rusnac	Sacked	14 August 2014	7	(Croatia) Zoran Zekić	14 August 2014
Dinamo-Auto	(Moldova) Dumitru Arabadji	Sacked	17 August 2014	11	(Moldova) Nicolae Mandrîcenco (caretaker)	17 August 2014
Dinamo-Auto	(Moldova) Nicolae Mandrîcenco (caretaker)	End of tenure as a caretaker	3 September 2014	11	(Moldova) Igor Negrescu	3 September 2014
Zaria Bălți	(Moldova) Nicolae Bunea	Mutual agreement	1 November 2014	9	(Moldova) Leonid Tcaci	1 November 2014
Dacia Chișinău	(Montenegro) Dejan Vukićević	Sacked	4 November 2014	4	(Moldova) Veaceslav Semionov (caretaker)	4 November 2014
FC Tiraspol	(Moldova) Vlad Goian	Sacked	15 December 2014	5	(Moldova) Lilian Popescu	15 December 2014
Zimbru Chișinău	(Belarus) Oleg Kubarev	Mutual agreement	17 December 2014	6	(Moldova) Veaceslav Rusnac	17 December 2014
Dacia Chișinău	(Moldova) Veaceslav Semionov (caretaker)	End of tenure as a caretaker	20 January 2014	1	(Belarus) Oleg Kubarev	20 January 2014
Dacia Chișinău	(Belarus) Oleg Kubarev	Sacked	9 March 2015	2	(Moldova) Veaceslav Semionov (caretaker)	9 March 2015
Zaria Bălți	(Moldova) Leonid Tcaci	Mutual agreement	11 March 2015	8	(Moldova) Serghei Dubrovin	11 March 2015
Saxan Ceadîr-Lunga	(Ukraine) Volodymyr Lyutyi	Sacked	19 April 2015	6	(Moldova) Ivan Burduniuc (caretaker)	19 April 2015
Dacia Chișinău	(Moldova) Veaceslav Semionov (caretaker)	End of tenure as a caretaker	26 April 2015	1	(Russia) Igor Dobrovolski	26 April 2015

== League table ==
Pos	Team	Pld	W	D	L	GF	GA	GD	Pts	Qualification
1	Milsami Orhei (C)	24	17	4	3	50	15	+35	55	Qualification for the Champions League second qualifying round
2	Dacia Chișinău	24	17	4	3	48	13	+35	55	Qualification for the Europa League first qualifying round
3	Sheriff Tiraspol	24	17	4	3	56	16	+40	55	Qualification for the Europa League first qualifying round
4	Tiraspol	24	14	2	8	49	28	+21	44	Team was dissolved after the season (Note: Tiraspol, the fourth-placed team, would have qualified for the Europa League first qualifying round, but were dissolved at the end of the 2014–15 season. As a result, the berth was given to Saxan, the fifth-placed team of the league.)
5	Saxan Ceadîr-Lunga	24	8	6	10	20	30	−10	30	Qualification for the Europa League first qualifying round
6	Zimbru Chișinău	24	7	6	11	23	19	+4	27	
7	Academia Chișinău	24	5	2	17	18	47	−29	17	
8	Dinamo-Auto Tiraspol	24	4	2	18	23	63	−40	14	
9	Zaria Bălți	24	4	0	20	10	66	−56	12	
10	Veris Chișinău	0	0	0	0	0	0	0	0	Team withdrawn (Note: FC Veris were officially withdrawn from the league on 5 December 2014.)
11	Costuleni	0	0	0	0	0	0	0	0	Team withdrawn (Note: FC Costuleni were officially withdrawn from the league on 20 November 2014.)

Source: Moldovan Football Federation
Rules for classification: 1st points; 2nd head-to-head points; 3rd head-to-head goal difference; 4th head-to-head goals scored; 5th goal difference; 6th number of goals scored; 7th Fair Play competition
(C) Champions

=== Positions by round ===
The following table represents the teams position after each round in the competition.

Leader
2nd place
3rd place

Team ╲ Round	1	2	3	4	5	6	7	8	9	10	11	12	13	14	15	16	17	18	19	20	21	22	23	24	25	26	27	28	29	30	31
Academia Chișinău	8	8	8	8	8	8	8	8	8	8	8	8	8	8	7	7	7	7	7	7	7	7	7	7	7	7	7	7	7	7	7
Dacia Chișinău	5	1	1	1	1	1	1	1	1	2	2	2	3	3	2	1	1	1	1	2	1	2	1	1	2	1	1	1	1	1	2
Dinamo-Auto Tiraspol	9	9	9	9	9	9	9	9	9	9	9	9	9	9	9	9	9	9	9	9	9	9	9	9	9	9	9	9	8	8	8
Milsami Orhei	3	7	5	6	6	4	4	3	4	5	3	3	2	2	3	2	2	2	2	1	3	1	2	2	1	2	2	2	2	2	1
Saxan Ceadîr-Lunga	4	6	4	3	3	3	3	2	3	3	4	4	5	5	4	4	4	4	5	5	5	5	5	5	5	6	5	6	6	6	5
Sheriff Tiraspol	1	2	6	4	4	6	5	4	2	1	1	1	1	1	1	3	3	3	3	3	2	3	3	3	3	3	3	3	3	3	3
Tiraspol	7	3	3	2	2	2	2	5	5	4	5	5	4	4	5	5	5	5	4	4	4	4	4	4	4	4	4	4	4	4	4
Zaria Bălți	2	5	7	7	7	7	7	7	6	7	7	7	7	7	8	8	8	8	8	8	8	8	8	8	8	8	8	8	9	9	9
Zimbru Chișinău	6	4	2	5	5	5	6	6	7	6	6	6	6	6	6	6	6	6	6	6	6	6	6	6	6	5	6	5	5	5	6

Source: Kicker.de (in German)

== Results ==
The schedule consists of three rounds. During the first two rounds, each team plays each other once home and away for a total of 20 matches. The pairings of the third round will then be set according to the standings after the first two rounds, giving every team a third game against each opponent for a total of 30 games per team.

=== First and second round ===
Home \ Away	ACA	DAC	DIN	MIL	ZAR	SAX	SHE	TIR	ZIM
Academia Chișinău		0–1	2–0	1–1	5–2	0–1	0–3	0–3	0–2
Dacia Chișinău	1–0		2–0	2–0	3–0	0–0	3–2	1–2	0–0
Dinamo-Auto Tiraspol	1–0	0–2		0–5	4–0	0–3	1–2	0–1	0–3
Milsami Orhei	1–0	3–0	6–0		4–0	1–1	0–0	1–0	1–0
Zaria Bălți	1–0	0–2	2–0	1–3		2–0	0–1	0–1	0–1
Saxan Ceadîr-Lunga	1–0	0–1	2–1	0–2	1–0		1–1	2–0	0–0
Sheriff Tiraspol	3–0	1–2	7–2	0–0	4–0	4–0		2–1	3–0
Tiraspol	3–1	0–0	8–1	1–2	2–0	4–0	2–4		2–1
Zimbru Chișinău	0–1	0–1	2–0	0–2	6–0	0–0	0–1	3–1	

Source: Moldovan Football Federation
Legend: Blue = home team win; Yellow = draw; Red = away team win.

=== Third round ===
Key numbers for pairing determination (number marks position after 36 games):

Home \ Away	ACA	DAC	DIN	MIL	ZAR	SAX	SHE	TIR	ZIM
Academia Chișinău				1–3	3–0	1–4	0–2		
Dacia Chișinău	8–1		6–2			3–0	0–0		
Dinamo-Auto Tiraspol	1–1			1–2		4–1	0–1		
Milsami Orhei		2–1			5–0			1–2	2–1
Zaria Bălți		0–4	1–5					0–4	0–2
Saxan Ceadîr-Lunga				1–0	0–1		0–1		1–1
Sheriff Tiraspol				2–3	6–0			4–0	2–1
Tiraspol	5–0	0–4	2–2			3–1			
Zimbru Chișinău	0–1	0–1	0–0					0–0	

Source: Moldovan Football Federation
Legend: Blue = home team win; Yellow = draw; Red = away team win.

== Top goalscorers ==
Updated to matches played on 21 May 2015.

Rank	Player	Club	Goals
1	(Brazil) Ricardinho	Sheriff Tiraspol	19
2	(Moldova) Gheorghe Boghiu	Tiraspol	13
3	(Romania) Romeo Surdu	Milsami Orhei	12
4	(Moldova) Petru Leucă	Dacia Chișinău	11
5	(Romania) Cristian Bud	Milsami Orhei	9
6	(Brazil) Juninho Potiguar	Sheriff Tiraspol	8
7	(Moldova) Vadim Cemîrtan	Dinamo-Auto	7
8	(Moldova) Gheorghe Ovseanicov	Tiraspol	5
8	(Moldova) Radu Gînsari	Sheriff Tiraspol	5
8	(Moldova) Maxim Mihaliov	Dinamo-Auto	5
8	(Ukraine) Serhiy Shapoval	FC Tiraspol	5

=== Hat-tricks ===
Key
^{4}	Player scored four goals
^{5}	Player scored five goals

Player	Home	Away	Result	Date
(Romania) Romeo Surdu	Milsami Orhei	Dinamo-Auto Tiraspol	6–0	29 August 2014
(Brazil) Ricardo Cavalcante Mendes	FC Tiraspol	Sheriff Tiraspol	2–4	25 October 2014
(Brazil) ^{4} Ricardo Cavalcante Mendes	Sheriff Tiraspol	Dinamo-Auto Tiraspol	7–2	13 December 2014
(Moldova) Vadim Cemîrtan	Dinamo-Auto Tiraspol	Zaria Bălți	4–0	4 March 2015
(Moldova) Viorel Frunză	Dacia Chișinău	Dinamo-Auto Tiraspol	6–2	20 March 2015
(Moldova) Gheorghe Boghiu	FC Tiraspol	Academia Chișinău	5–0	20 March 2015
(Moldova) Petru Leucă	Dacia Chișinău	Academia Chișinău	8–1	15 May 2015
(Georgia (country)) Irakli Goginashvili	Academia Chișinău	Saxan Ceadîr-Lunga	1–4	20 May 2015

== Clean sheets ==
As of 21 May 2015

Rank	Player	Club	Clean sheets
1	(Moldova) Dorian Railean	Dacia Chișinău	12
1	(Moldova) Serghei Pașcenco	Sheriff Tiraspol	12
3	(Moldova) Radu Mîțu	Milsami Orhei	11
3	(Moldova) Alexei Coșelev	Saxan Ceadîr-Lunga (6) & FC Tiraspol (5)	11
5	(Moldova) Denis Rusu	Zimbru Chișinău	8
6	(Bulgaria) Georgi Georgiev	FC Tiraspol	6
7	(Moldova) Artiom Gaiduchevici	Dacia Chișinău	5
8	(Moldova) Ghenadie Moșneaga	Zaria Bălți	3
8	(Moldova) Anatolii Chirinciuc	Zimbru Chișinău	3
8	(Moldova) Dmitri Radu	Saxan Ceadîr-Lunga	3
8	(Argentina) Matías Omar Degra	Sheriff Tiraspol	3

== Disciplinary ==
As of 22 May 2015

Rank	Player	Club	Yellow card	Double Yellow Card/Ejection	Red Card	Points
1	(Moldova) Eugen Celeadnic	Academia Chișinău	4	1	1	9
2	(Ivory Coast) Yacouba Hamba	FC Saxan	6	1	0	8
3	(Moldova) Victor Mudrac	Dinamo-Auto	7	0	0	7
4	(Ivory Coast) Kouassi Kouadja	FC Saxan	3	0	1	6
4	(Moldova) Andrei Novicov	FC Tiraspol	6	0	0	6
4	(Moldova) Vladimir Cheptenari	Zaria Bălți	6	0	0	6
4	(Russia) Akhmet Barakhoyev	Dacia Chișinău	6	0	0	6
4	(Moldova) Maxim Boghiu	Academia Chișinău	4	1	0	6
9	(Ukraine) Yevhen Smyrnov	FC Tiraspol	3	1	0	5
9	(Ukraine) Kyrylo Sydorenko	FC Tiraspol	5	0	0	5
9	(Moldova) Alexandru Cheltuială	Academia Chișinău	2	0	1	5
9	(Ukraine) Volodymyr Zastavnyi	Dacia Chișinău	5	0	0	5
9	(Ukraine) Maksym Havrylenko	Dacia Chișinău	5	0	0	5
9	(Moldova) Vitalie Grijuc	Zaria Bălți	5	0	0	5
9	(Morocco) Adil Rhaili	Milsami Orhei	5	0	0	5
9	(Moldova) Gheorghe Andronic	Milsami Orhei	5	0	0	5
9	(Brazil) Ricardinho	Sheriff Tiraspol	5	0	0	5
9	(Moldova) Alexandru Onică	Zimbru Chișinău	5	0	0	5
9	(Moldova) Victor Truhanov	FC Saxan	2	0	1	5
9	(Moldova) Denis Iliescu	Dinamo-Auto	3	1	0	5
9	(Moldova) Maxim Focşa	Dinamo-Auto(3) & Academia Chișinău (2)	5	0	0	5

== Fair-Play Award ==
As of 20 May 2015

Rank	Club	Yellow card	Double Yellow Card/Ejection	Direct Red Card	Points	Worst Disciplinary Player
1	Sheriff Tiraspol	29	1	1	34	(Brazil) Ricardinho (5 point's)
2	Zaria Bălți	36	0	0	36	(Moldova) Vladimir Cheptenari (6 point's)
3	Milsami Orhei	41	0	0	41	(Morocco) Adil Rhaili, (Moldova) Gheorghe Andronic (5 point's)
4	Dacia Chișinău	41	0	1	44	(Russia) Akhmet Barakhoyev (6 point's)
5	Tiraspol	43	1	0	45	(Moldova) Andrei Novicov (6 point's)
6	Zimbru Chișinău	44	1	0	46	(Moldova) Alexandru Onică (6 point's)
7	Saxan	37	2	3	50	(Ivory Coast) Yacouba Hamba (8 point's)
8	Dinamo-Auto Tiraspol	49	2	0	53	(Moldova) Victor Mudrac (7 point's)
9	Academia Chișinău	43	4	2	57	(Moldova) Eugen Celeadnic (9 point's)

Points are allocated points to each yellow (1 point), two yellow (2 points) and red card (3 points) for ranking purposes. This does not represent any official rankings.

== Attendance ==
As of 22 May 2015

Pos	Team	Total	High	Low	Average	Change
1	Saxan Ceadîr-Lunga	23,600	4,000	600	2,300	n/a
2	Sheriff Tiraspol	14,980	2,800	480	1,640	+86.2%
3	Milsami Orhei	13,650	3,000	300	1,650	+94.1%
4	Zimbru Chișinău	11,900	3,800	200	2,000	−14.9%
5	Zaria Bălți	6,600	1,500	100	800	−38.5%
6	Tiraspol	3,520	850	100	475	+26.7%
7	Dacia Chișinău	3,400	600	100	350	−30.0%
8	Academia Chișinău	3,250	600	50	325	+18.2%
9	Dinamo-Auto Tiraspol	1,700	300	50	175	−30.0%
	League total	82,600	4,000	50	2,025	−10.0%
