= AC Sparta Prague in European football =

- Club: Sparta Prague
- First entry: 1964–65 European Cup Winners' Cup
- Latest entry: 2026–27 UEFA Europa League

AC Sparta Prague is an association football club from Prague, Czech Republic. The team has participated in 39 seasons of Union of European Football Associations (UEFA) club competitions, including 25 seasons in the Champions League and its predecessors, 14 seasons in the UEFA Cup and Europa League and six seasons in the Cup Winners' Cup. The club's first appearance was in the 1964–65 European Cup Winners' Cup. The club's best performance is reaching the semi-finals of the Cup Winners' Cup, which they managed in the 1972–73 season.

The club plays its home matches at epet ARENA, an all-seater stadium in Prague. Jiří Novotný has appeared in the most UEFA matches for Sparta, with 83 games to his name. The scoring record is shared between Horst Siegl and Ivan Mráz with 14 goals each.

== Key ==
- Pld = Games played
- W = Games won
- D = Games drawn
- L = Games lost
- GF = Goals for
- GA = Goals against
- GD = Goal difference
- (a.e.t.) = Match determined after extra time
- (a) = Match determined by away goals rule
- pen. = Match determined by penalty shoot-out
- QF = Quarter-finals
- Group = Group stage
- Group 2 = Second group stage
- PO = Play-off round
- KRPO = Knockout round play-offs
- R3 = Round 3
- R2 = Round 2
- R1 = Round 1
- Q3 = Third qualification round
- Q2 = Second qualification round
- Q1 = First qualification round
- Q = Qualification round
- LP = League phase

== All-time statistics ==
The following is a list of the all-time statistics from Sparta Prague's games in the three UEFA tournaments it has participated in, as well as the overall total. The list contains the tournament, the number of games played (Pld), won (W), drawn (D) and lost (L), as well as goals for (GF), goals against (GA) and goal difference (GD). The statistics are up to date as of 28 July 2022.

Competition	Pld	W	D	L	GF	GA	GD
European Cup/UEFA CL	160	61	34	65	211	218	–7
~~Cup Winners' Cup~~	30	15	5	10	68	32	+36
UEFA Cup/UEFA Europa League	124	50	34	40	175	153	+22
UEFA Europa Conference League	4	0	1	3	2	5	–3
Total	318	126	74	118	456	408	+48

=== Matches ===
The following is a complete list of matches played by Sparta in UEFA tournaments. It includes the season, tournament, the stage, the opponent club and its country, the date, the venue and the score, with Sparta's score noted first. It is up to date as of 11 August 2026.

List of AC Sparta Prague matches in European football
Season	Tournament	Stage	Opponent		Date	Venue	Score
Season	Tournament	Stage	Team	Country	Date	Venue	Score
1964–65	Cup Winners' Cup	R1	Anorthosis Famagusta	Cyprus	15 September 1964	Stadion Letná, Prague	10–0
1964–65	Cup Winners' Cup	R1	Anorthosis Famagusta	Cyprus	19 September 1964	Stadion ve Štruncových sadech, Plzeň	6–0
1964–65	Cup Winners' Cup	R2	West Ham United	England	24 November 1964	Boleyn Ground, London	0–2
1964–65	Cup Winners' Cup	R2	West Ham United	England	8 December 1964	Stadion Letná, Prague	2–1
1965–66	European Cup	Q	Lausanne-Sports	Switzerland	22 September 1965	Stade Olympique de la Pontaise, Lausanne	0–0
1965–66	European Cup	Q	Lausanne-Sports	Switzerland	29 September 1965	Stadion Letná, Prague	4–0
1965–66	European Cup	R1	Górnik Zabrze	Poland	24 November 1965	Stadion Letná, Prague	3–0
1965–66	European Cup	R1	Górnik Zabrze	Poland	28 November 1965	Silesian Stadium, Chorzów	2–1
1965–66	European Cup	QF	Partizan	(Socialist Federal Republic of Yugoslavia) Yugoslavia	2 March 1966	Stadion Letná, Prague	4–1
1965–66	European Cup	QF	Partizan	(Socialist Federal Republic of Yugoslavia) Yugoslavia	9 March 1966	JNA Stadium, Belgrade	0–5
1967–68	European Cup	R1	Skeid	Norway	20 September 1967	Bislett Stadion, Oslo	1–0
1967–68	European Cup	R1	Skeid	Norway	4 October 1967	Stadion Letná, Prague	1–1
1967–68	European Cup	R2	Anderlecht	Belgium	29 November 1967	Stadion Eden, Prague	3–2
1967–68	European Cup	R2	Anderlecht	Belgium	6 December 1967	Émile Versé Stadium, Brussels	3–3
1967–68	European Cup	QF	Real Madrid	Spain	6 March 1968	Santiago Bernabéu, Madrid	0–3
1967–68	European Cup	QF	Real Madrid	Spain	20 March 1968	Stadion Eden, Prague	2–1
1972–73	Cup Winners' Cup	R1	Standard Liège	Belgium	12 September 1972	Stade Maurice Dufrasne, Liège	0–1
1972–73	Cup Winners' Cup	R1	Standard Liège	Belgium	26 September 1972	Stadion Letná, Prague	4–2
1972–73	Cup Winners' Cup	R2	Ferencváros	Hungary	24 October 1972	Népstadion, Budapest	0–2
1972–73	Cup Winners' Cup	R2	Ferencváros	Hungary	7 November 1972	Stadion Letná, Prague	4–1
1972–73	Cup Winners' Cup	QF	Schalke 04	West Germany	6 March 1973	Parkstadion, Gelsenkirchen	1–2
1972–73	Cup Winners' Cup	QF	Schalke 04	West Germany	20 March 1973	Stadion Letná, Prague	3–0
1972–73	Cup Winners' Cup	SF	Milan	Italy	11 April 1973	San Siro, Milan	0–1
1972–73	Cup Winners' Cup	SF	Milan	Italy	25 April 1973	Stadion Letná, Prague	0–1
1976–77	Cup Winners' Cup	R1	MTK	Hungary	13 September 1976	Hungária körúti stadion, Budapest	1–3
1976–77	Cup Winners' Cup	R1	MTK	Hungary	28 September 1976	Stadion Letná, Prague	1–1
1980–81	Cup Winners' Cup	R1	Spora Luxembourg	Luxembourg	15 September 1980	Stade Municipale, Luxembourg	6–0
1980–81	Cup Winners' Cup	R1	Spora Luxembourg	Luxembourg	30 September 1980	Stadion Letná, Prague	6–0
1980–81	Cup Winners' Cup	R2	Slavia Sofia	Bulgaria	21 October 1980	Stadion Letná, Prague	2–0
1980–81	Cup Winners' Cup	R2	Slavia Sofia	Bulgaria	4 November 1980	Slavia Stadium, Sofia	0–3
1981–82	UEFA Cup	R1	Neuchâtel Xamax	Switzerland	15 September 1981	Stade de la Maladière, Neuchâtel	0–4
1981–82	UEFA Cup	R1	Neuchâtel Xamax	Switzerland	29 September 1981	Stadion Letná, Prague	3–2
1983–84	UEFA Cup	R1	Real Madrid	Spain	14 September 1983	Stadion Letná, Prague	3–2
1983–84	UEFA Cup	R1	Real Madrid	Spain	28 September 1983	Santiago Bernabéu, Madrid	1–1
1983–84	UEFA Cup	R2	Widzew Łódź	Poland	19 October 1983	Away	0–1
1983–84	UEFA Cup	R2	Widzew Łódź	Poland	2 November 1983	Home	3–0
1983–84	UEFA Cup	R3	Watford	England	23 November 1983	Vicarage Road, Watford	3–2
1983–84	UEFA Cup	R3	Watford	England	7 December 1983	Home	4–0
1983–84	UEFA Cup	QF	Hajduk Split	(Socialist Federal Republic of Yugoslavia) Yugoslavia	7 March 1984	Home	1–0
1983–84	UEFA Cup	QF	Hajduk Split	(Socialist Federal Republic of Yugoslavia) Yugoslavia	21 March 1984	Away	0–2 (a.e.t.)
1984–85	European Cup	R1	Vålerenga	Norway	19 September 1984	Bislett Stadion, Oslo	3–3
1984–85	European Cup	R1	Vålerenga	Norway	3 October 1984	Stadion Letná, Prague	2–0
1984–85	European Cup	R2	Lyngby	Denmark	24 October 1984	Stadion Letná, Prague	0–0
1984–85	European Cup	R2	Lyngby	Denmark	7 November 1984	Idrætsparken, Copenhagen	2–1
1984–85	European Cup	QF	Juventus	Italy	6 March 1985	Stadio Olimpico, Turin	0–3
1984–85	European Cup	QF	Juventus	Italy	20 March 1985	Stadion Letná, Prague	1–0
1985–86	European Cup	R1	Barcelona	Spain	18 September 1985	Stadion Letná, Prague	1–2
1985–86	European Cup	R1	Barcelona	Spain	2 October 1985	Camp Nou, Barcelona	1–0 (a)
1986–87	UEFA Cup	R1	Vitória de Guimarães	Portugal	17 September 1986	Home	1–1
1986–87	UEFA Cup	R1	Vitória de Guimarães	Portugal	1 October 1986	Away	1–2
1987–88	European Cup	R1	Fram	Iceland	16 September 1987	Laugardalsvöllur, Reykjavík	2–0
1987–88	European Cup	R1	Fram	Iceland	30 September 1987	Stadion Letná, Prague	8–0
1987–88	European Cup	R2	Anderlecht	Belgium	21 October 1987	Stadion Letná, Prague	1–2
1987–88	European Cup	R2	Anderlecht	Belgium	4 November 1987	Constant Vanden Stock Stadium, Brussels	0–1
1988–89	European Cup	R1	Steaua București	Romania	7 September 1988	Stadion Letná, Prague	1–5
1988–89	European Cup	R1	Steaua București	Romania	5 October 1988	Stadionul Steaua, Bucharest	2–2
1989–90	European Cup	R1	Fenerbahçe	Turkey	13 September 1989	Stadion Letná, Prague	3–1
1989–90	European Cup	R1	Fenerbahçe	Turkey	27 September 1989	Şükrü Saracoğlu Stadium, Istanbul	2–1
1989–90	European Cup	R2	CSKA Sofia	Bulgaria	18 October 1989	Štadión Antona Malatinského, Trnava	2–2
1989–90	European Cup	R2	CSKA Sofia	Bulgaria	1 November 1989	Balgarska Armia Stadium, Sofia	0–3
1990–91	European Cup	R1	Spartak Moscow	(Soviet Union) USSR	19 September 1990	Stadion Letná, Prague	0–2
1990–91	European Cup	R1	Spartak Moscow	(Soviet Union) USSR	3 October 1990	Luzhniki Stadium, Moscow	0–2
1991–92	European Cup	R1	Rangers	Scotland	18 September 1991	Stadion Letná, Prague	1–0
1991–92	European Cup	R1	Rangers	Scotland	2 October 1991	Ibrox Stadium, Glasgow	1–2 (a)
1991–92	European Cup	R2	Marseille	France	23 October 1991	Stade Vélodrome, Marseille	2–3
1991–92	European Cup	R2	Marseille	France	6 November 1991	Stadion Letná, Prague	2–1 (a)
1991–92	European Cup	Group	Barcelona	Spain	27 November 1991	Camp Nou, Barcelona	2–3
1991–92	European Cup	Group	Dynamo Kyiv	(Soviet Union) USSR	11 December 1991	Stadion Letná, Prague	2–1
1991–92	European Cup	Group	Benfica	Portugal	4 March 1992	Estádio da Luz, Lisbon	1–1
1991–92	European Cup	Group	Benfica	Portugal	18 March 1992	Stadion Letná, Prague	1–1
1991–92	European Cup	Group	Barcelona	Spain	1 April 1992	Stadion Letná, Prague	1–0
1991–92	European Cup	Group	Dynamo Kyiv	(Soviet Union) USSR	15 April 1992	Olimpiyskiy, Kyiv	0–1
1992–93	Cup Winners' Cup	R1	Airdrieonians	Scotland	15 September 1992	Away	1–0
1992–93	Cup Winners' Cup	R1	Airdrieonians	Scotland	30 September 1992	Home	2–1
1992–93	Cup Winners' Cup	R2	Werder Bremen	Germany	21 October 1992	Weserstadion, Bremen	3–2
1992–93	Cup Winners' Cup	R2	Werder Bremen	Germany	4 November 1992	Stadion Letná, Prague	1–0
1992–93	Cup Winners' Cup	QF	Parma	Italy	2 March 1993	Stadion Letná, Prague	0–0
1992–93	Cup Winners' Cup	QF	Parma	Italy	16 March 1993	Stadio Ennio Tardini, Parma	0–2
1993–94	Champions League	R1	AIK	Sweden	15 September 1993	Råsundastadion, Stockholm	0–1
1993–94	Champions League	R1	AIK	Sweden	29 September 1993	Stadion Letná, Prague	2–0
1993–94	Champions League	R2	Anderlecht	Belgium	20 October 1993	Stadion Letná, Prague	0–1
1993–94	Champions League	R2	Anderlecht	Belgium	3 November 1993	Constant Vanden Stock Stadium, Brussels	2–4
1994–95	Champions League	Q	IFK Göteborg	Sweden	10 August 1994	Chance Arena, Jablonec nad Nisou	1–0
1994–95	Champions League	Q	IFK Göteborg	Sweden	24 August 1994	Ullevi, Gothenburg	0–2
1995–96	UEFA Cup	Q	Galatasaray	Turkey	8 August 1995	Stadion Letná, Prague	3–1
1995–96	UEFA Cup	Q	Galatasaray	Turkey	22 August 1995	Ali Sami Yen Stadium, Istanbul	1–1
1995–96	UEFA Cup	R1	Silkeborg	Denmark	12 September 1995	Stadion Letná, Prague	0–1
1995–96	UEFA Cup	R1	Silkeborg	Denmark	26 September 1995	Silkeborg Stadion, Silkeborg	2–1 (a)
1995–96	UEFA Cup	R2	Zimbru Chișinău	Moldova	17 October 1995	Stadion Letná, Prague	4–3
1995–96	UEFA Cup	R2	Zimbru Chișinău	Moldova	31 October 1995	Chișinău	2–0
1995–96	UEFA Cup	R3	Milan	Italy	23 November 1995	San Siro, Milan	0–2
1995–96	UEFA Cup	R3	Milan	Italy	7 December 1995	Stadion Letná, Prague	0–0
1996–97	Cup Winners' Cup	Q	Glentoran	Northern Ireland	8 August 1996	The Oval, Belfast	2–1
1996–97	Cup Winners' Cup	Q	Glentoran	Northern Ireland	22 August 1996	Stadion Letná, Prague	8–0
1996–97	Cup Winners' Cup	R1	Sturm Graz	Austria	12 September 1996	Arnold Schwarzenegger Stadium, Graz	2–2
1996–97	Cup Winners' Cup	R1	Sturm Graz	Austria	26 September 1996	Stadion Letná, Prague	1–1 (a)
1996–97	Cup Winners' Cup	R2	Fiorentina	Italy	17 October 1996	Stadio Artemio Franchi, Florence	1–2
1996–97	Cup Winners' Cup	R2	Fiorentina	Italy	31 October 1996	Stadion Letná, Prague	1–1
1997–98	Champions League	Q2	Salzburg	Austria	13 August 1997	Stadion Lehen, Salzburg	0–0
1997–98	Champions League	Q2	Salzburg	Austria	27 August 1997	Stadion Letná, Prague	3–0
1997–98	Champions League	Group	Parma	Italy	17 September 1997	Stadion Letná, Prague	0–0
1997–98	Champions League	Group	Borussia Dortmund	Germany	1 October 1997	Westfalenstadion, Dortmund	1–4
1997–98	Champions League	Group	Galatasaray	Turkey	22 October 1997	Stadion Letná, Prague	3–0
1997–98	Champions League	Group	Galatasaray	Turkey	5 November 1997	Ali Sami Yen Stadium, Istanbul	0–2
1997–98	Champions League	Group	Parma	Italy	27 November 1997	Stadio Ennio Tardini, Parma	2–2
1997–98	Champions League	Group	Borussia Dortmund	Germany	10 December 1997	Stadion Letná, Prague	0–3
1998–99	Champions League	Q2	Dynamo Kyiv	Ukraine	12 August 1998	Olimpiyskiy, Kyiv	1–0
1998–99	Champions League	Q2	Dynamo Kyiv	Ukraine	26 August 1998	Stadion Letná, Prague	0–1 (a.e.t.) (1–3 pen.)
1998–99	UEFA Cup	R1	Real Sociedad	Spain	15 September 1998	Stadion Letná, Prague	2–4
1998–99	UEFA Cup	R1	Real Sociedad	Spain	29 September 1998	Anoeta Stadium, San Sebastián	0–1
1999–2000	Champions League	Group	Bordeaux	France	15 September 1999	Stadion Letná, Prague	0–0
1999–2000	Champions League	Group	Spartak Moscow	Russia	21 September 1999	Luzhniki Stadium, Moscow	1–1
1999–2000	Champions League	Group	Willem II	Netherlands	28 September 1999	Stadion Letná, Prague	4–0
1999–2000	Champions League	Group	Willem II	Netherlands	20 October 1999	Koning Willem II Stadion, Tilburg	4–3
1999–2000	Champions League	Group	Bordeaux	France	26 October 1999	Stade Chaban-Delmas, Bordeaux	0–0
1999–2000	Champions League	Group	Spartak Moscow	Russia	3 November 1999	Stadion Letná, Prague	5–2
1999–2000	Champions League	Group 2	Porto	Portugal	23 November 1999	Stadion Letná, Prague	0–2
1999–2000	Champions League	Group 2	Barcelona	Spain	8 December 1999	Camp Nou, Barcelona	0–5
1999–2000	Champions League	Group 2	Hertha BSC	Germany	1 March 2000	Stadion Letná, Prague	1–1
1999–2000	Champions League	Group 2	Hertha BSC	Germany	7 March 2000	Olympic Stadium, Berlin	1–0
1999–2000	Champions League	Group 2	Porto	Portugal	15 March 2000	Estádio das Antas, Porto	2–2
1999–2000	Champions League	Group 2	Barcelona	Spain	21 March 2000	Stadion Letná, Prague	1–2
2000–01	Champions League	Q3	Zimbru Chișinău	Moldova	8 August 2000	Speia, Chișinău	1–0
2000–01	Champions League	Q3	Zimbru Chișinău	Moldova	23 August 2000	Stadion Letná, Prague	1–0
2000–01	Champions League	Group	Arsenal	England	12 September 2000	Stadion Letná, Prague	0–1
2000–01	Champions League	Group	Lazio	Italy	20 September 2000	Stadio Olimpico, Rome	0–3
2000–01	Champions League	Group	Shakhtar Donetsk	Ukraine	27 September 2000	Stadion Letná, Prague	3–2
2000–01	Champions League	Group	Shakhtar Donetsk	Ukraine	17 October 2000	Shakhtar Stadium, Donetsk	1–2
2000–01	Champions League	Group	Arsenal	England	25 October 2000	Highbury Stadium, London	2–4
2000–01	Champions League	Group	Lazio	Italy	7 November 2000	Stadion Letná, Prague	0–1
2001–02	Champions League	Group	Bayern Munich	Germany	18 September 2001	Olympiastadion, Berlin	0–0
2001–02	Champions League	Group	Feyenoord	Netherlands	25 September 2001	Stadion Letná, Prague	4–0
2001–02	Champions League	Group	Spartak Moscow	Russia	10 October 2001	Stadion Letná, Prague	2–0
2001–02	Champions League	Group	Feyenoord	Netherlands	17 October 2001	De Kuip, Rotterdam	2–0
2001–02	Champions League	Group	Spartak Moscow	Russia	23 October 2001	Luzhniki Stadium, Moscow	2–2
2001–02	Champions League	Group	Bayern Munich	Germany	31 October 2001	Stadion Letná, Prague	0–1
2001–02	Champions League	Group 2	Real Madrid	Spain	21 November 2001	Stadion Letná, Prague	2–3
2001–02	Champions League	Group 2	Porto	Portugal	4 December 2001	Estádio das Antas, Porto	1–0
2001–02	Champions League	Group 2	Panathinaikos	Greece	19 February 2002	Stadion Letná, Prague	0–2
2001–02	Champions League	Group 2	Panathinaikos	Greece	27 February 2002	Leoforos Alexandras Stadium, Athens	1–2
2001–02	Champions League	Group 2	Real Madrid	Spain	12 March 2002	Santiago Bernabéu, Madrid	0–3
2001–02	Champions League	Group 2	Porto	Portugal	20 March 2002	Stadion Letná, Prague	2–0
2002–03	Champions League	Q2	Torpedo Kutaisi	(Georgia (country)) Georgia	31 July 2002	Stadion Letná, Prague	3–0
2002–03	Champions League	Q2	Torpedo Kutaisi	(Georgia (country)) Georgia	7 August 2002	Givi Kiladze Stadium, Kutaisi	2–1
2002–03	Champions League	Q3	Genk	Belgium	13 August 2002	KRC Genk Arena, Genk	0–2
2002–03	Champions League	Q3	Genk	Belgium	27 August 2002	Stadion Letná, Prague	4–2 (a)
2002–03	UEFA Cup	R1	Široki Brijeg	Bosnia and Herzegovina	19 September 2002	Stadion Letná, Prague	3–0
2002–03	UEFA Cup	R1	Široki Brijeg	Bosnia and Herzegovina	3 October 2002	Stadion Pecara, Široki Brijeg	1–0
2002–03	UEFA Cup	R2	Denizlispor	Turkey	31 October 2002	Stadion Letná, Prague	1–0
2002–03	UEFA Cup	R2	Denizlispor	Turkey	14 November 2002	Denizli Atatürk Stadium, Denizli	0–2
2003–04	Champions League	Q3	Vardar	(North Macedonia) Macedonia	13 August 2003	Philip II Arena, Skopje	3–2
2003–04	Champions League	Q3	Vardar	(North Macedonia) Macedonia	26 August 2003	Stadion Letná, Prague	2–2
2003–04	Champions League	Group	Chelsea	England	16 September 2003	Stadion Letná, Prague	0–1
2003–04	Champions League	Group	Lazio	Italy	1 October 2003	Stadio Olimpico, Rome	2–2
2003–04	Champions League	Group	Beşiktaş	Turkey	22 October 2003	Stadion Letná, Prague	2–1
2003–04	Champions League	Group	Beşiktaş	Turkey	4 November 2003	BJK İnönü Stadium, Istanbul	0–1
2003–04	Champions League	Group	Chelsea	England	26 November 2003	Stamford Bridge, London	0–0
2003–04	Champions League	Group	Lazio	Italy	9 December 2003	Stadion Letná, Prague	1–0
2003–04	Champions League	Round of 16	Milan	Italy	24 February 2004	Stadion Letná, Prague	0–0
2003–04	Champions League	Round of 16	Milan	Italy	10 March 2004	San Siro, Milan	1–4
2004–05	Champions League	Q2	APOEL	Cyprus	28 July 2004	GSP Stadium, Nicosia	2–2
2004–05	Champions League	Q2	APOEL	Cyprus	4 August 2004	Stadion Letná, Prague	2–1
2004–05	Champions League	Q3	Ferencváros	Hungary	11 August 2004	Albert Flórián Stadium, Budapest	0–1
2004–05	Champions League	Q3	Ferencváros	Hungary	25 August 2004	Stadion Letná, Prague	2–0 (a.e.t.)
2004–05	Champions League	Group	Fenerbahçe	Turkey	15 September 2004	Şükrü Saracoğlu Stadium, Istanbul	0–1
2004–05	Champions League	Group	Lyon	France	28 September 2004	Stadion Letná, Prague	1–2
2004–05	Champions League	Group	Manchester United	England	19 October 2004	Stadion Letná, Prague	0–0
2004–05	Champions League	Group	Manchester United	England	3 November 2004	Old Trafford, Manchester	1–4
2004–05	Champions League	Group	Fenerbahçe	Turkey	23 November 2004	Stadion Letná, Prague	0–1
2004–05	Champions League	Group	Lyon	France	8 December 2004	Stade de Gerland, Lyon	0–5
2005–06	Champions League	Group	Ajax	Netherlands	14 September 2005	Stadion Letná, Prague	1–1
2005–06	Champions League	Group	Thun	Switzerland	27 September 2005	Stade de Suisse, Bern	0–1
2005–06	Champions League	Group	Arsenal	England	18 October 2005	Stadion Letná, Prague	0–2
2005–06	Champions League	Group	Arsenal	England	2 November 2005	Highbury Stadium, London	0–3
2005–06	Champions League	Group	Ajax	Netherlands	22 November 2005	Amsterdam ArenA, Amsterdam	1–2
2005–06	Champions League	Group	Thun	Switzerland	7 December 2005	Stadion Letná, Prague	0–0
2006–07	UEFA Cup	R1	Heart of Midlothian	Scotland	14 September 2006	Murrayfield, Edinburgh	2–0
2006–07	UEFA Cup	R1	Heart of Midlothian	Scotland	28 September 2006	Stadion Letná, Prague	0–0
2006–07	UEFA Cup	Group	Espanyol	Spain	19 October 2006	Stadion Letná, Prague	0–2
2006–07	UEFA Cup	Group	Zulte Waregem	Belgium	2 November 2006	Jules Ottenstadion, Ghent	1–3
2006–07	UEFA Cup	Group	Ajax	Netherlands	23 November 2006	Stadion Letná, Prague	0–0
2006–07	UEFA Cup	Group	Austria Vienna	Austria	30 November 2006	Ernst-Happel-Stadion, Vienna	1–0
2007–08	Champions League	Q3	Arsenal	England	15 August 2007	Stadion Letná, Prague	0–2
2007–08	Champions League	Q3	Arsenal	England	29 August 2007	Emirates Stadium, London	0–3
2007–08	UEFA Cup	R1	Odense Boldklub	Denmark	20 September 2007	Stadion Letná, Prague	0–0
2007–08	UEFA Cup	R1	Odense Boldklub	Denmark	4 October 2007	Odense Stadion, Odense	0–0 (a.e.t.) (4–3 pen.)
2007–08	UEFA Cup	Group	Zürich	Switzerland	25 October 2007	Stadion Letná, Prague	1–2
2007–08	UEFA Cup	Group	Toulouse	France	8 November 2007	Stadium Municipal, Toulouse	3–2
2007–08	UEFA Cup	Group	Spartak Moscow	Russia	29 November 2007	Stadion Letná, Prague	0–0
2007–08	UEFA Cup	Group	Bayer Leverkusen	Germany	6 December 2007	BayArena, Leverkusen	0–1
2008–09	Champions League	Q2	Sheriff Tiraspol	Moldova	30 July 2008	Stadionul Sheriff, Tiraspol	1–0
2008–09	Champions League	Q2	Sheriff Tiraspol	Moldova	6 August 2008	Stadion Letná, Prague	2–0
2008–09	Champions League	Q3	Panathinaikos	Greece	13 August 2008	Stadion Letná, Prague	1–2
2008–09	Champions League	Q3	Panathinaikos	Greece	26 August 2008	Spiros Louis Olympic Stadium, Athens	0–1
2008–09	UEFA Cup	R1	Dinamo Zagreb	Croatia	18 September 2008	Stadion Maksimir, Zagreb	0–0
2008–09	UEFA Cup	R1	Dinamo Zagreb	Croatia	2 October 2008	Stadion Letná, Prague	3–3 (a)
2009–10	Champions League	Q3	Panathinaikos	Greece	28 July 2009	Stadion Letná, Prague	3–1
2009–10	Champions League	Q3	Panathinaikos	Greece	4 August 2009	Spiros Louis Olympic Stadium, Athens	0–3
2009–10	Europa League	PO	Maribor	Slovenia	20 August 2009	Ljudski vrt, Maribor	2–0
2009–10	Europa League	PO	Maribor	Slovenia	27 August 2009	Stadion Letná, Prague	1–0
2009–10	Europa League	Group	PSV Eindhoven	Netherlands	17 September 2009	Stadion Letná, Prague	2–2
2009–10	Europa League	Group	Copenhagen	Denmark	1 October 2009	Parken, Copenhagen	0–1
2009–10	Europa League	Group	CFR Cluj	Romania	22 October 2009	Stadion Letná, Prague	2–0
2009–10	Europa League	Group	CFR Cluj	Romania	5 November 2009	Stadionul Dr. Constantin Rădulescu, Cluj-Napoca	3–2
2009–10	Europa League	Group	PSV Eindhoven	Netherlands	3 December 2009	Philips Stadion, Eindhoven	0–1
2009–10	Europa League	Group	Copenhagen	Denmark	16 December 2009	Stadion Letná, Prague	0–3
2010–11	Champions League	Q2	Liepājas Metalurgs	Latvia	13 July 2010	Daugava Stadium, Liepāja	3–0
2010–11	Champions League	Q2	Liepājas Metalurgs	Latvia	21 July 2010	Stadion Letná, Prague	2–0
2010–11	Champions League	Q3	Lech Poznań	Poland	27 July 2010	Stadion Letná, Prague	1–0
2010–11	Champions League	Q3	Lech Poznań	Poland	4 August 2010	Municipal Stadium, Poznań	1–0
2010–11	Champions League	PO	Žilina	Slovakia	17 August 2010	Stadion Letná, Prague	0–2
2010–11	Champions League	PO	Žilina	Slovakia	25 August 2010	Stadium Pod Dubňom, Žilina	0–1
2010–11	Europa League	Group	Palermo	Italy	16 September 2010	Stadion Letná, Prague	3–2
2010–11	Europa League	Group	CSKA Moscow	Russia	30 September 2010	Arena Khimki, Khimki	0–3
2010–11	Europa League	Group	Lausanne	Switzerland	21 October 2010	Stadion Letná, Prague	3–3
2010–11	Europa League	Group	Lausanne	Switzerland	4 November 2010	Stade Olympique de la Pontaise, Lausanne	3–1
2010–11	Europa League	Group	Palermo	Italy	2 December 2010	Stadio Renzo Barbera, Palermo	2–2
2010–11	Europa League	Group	CSKA Moscow	Russia	15 December 2010	Stadion Letná, Prague	1–1
2010–11	Europa League	Round of 32	Liverpool	England	17 February 2011	Stadion Letná, Prague	0–0
2010–11	Europa League	Round of 32	Liverpool	England	24 February 2011	Anfield, Liverpool	0–1
2011–12	Europa League	Q3	Sarajevo	Bosnia and Herzegovina	28 July 2011	Stadion Letná, Prague	5–0
2011–12	Europa League	Q3	Sarajevo	Bosnia and Herzegovina	4 August 2011	Asim Ferhatović Hase Stadium, Sarajevo	2–0
2011–12	Europa League	PO	Vaslui	Romania	18 August 2011	Stadionul Ceahlăul, Piatra Neamţ	0–2
2011–12	Europa League	PO	Vaslui	Romania	25 August 2011	Stadion Letná, Prague	1–0
2012–13	Europa League	Q3	Admira Wacker Mödling	Austria	2 August 2012	Bundesstadion Südstadt, Maria Enzersdorf	2–0
2012–13	Europa League	Q3	Admira Wacker Mödling	Austria	9 August 2012	Stadion Letná, Prague	2–2
2012–13	Europa League	PO	Feyenoord	Netherlands	23 August 2012	De Kuip, Rotterdam	2–2
2012–13	Europa League	PO	Feyenoord	Netherlands	30 August 2012	Stadion Letná, Prague	2–0
2012–13	Europa League	Group	Lyon	France	20 September 2012	Stade de Gerland, Lyon	1–2
2012–13	Europa League	Group	Athletic Bilbao	Spain	4 October 2012	Stadion Letná, Prague	3–1
2012–13	Europa League	Group	H. Kiryat Shmona	Israel	25 October 2012	Stadion Letná, Prague	3–1
2012–13	Europa League	Group	H. Kiryat Shmona	Israel	8 November 2012	Kiryat Eliezer Stadium, Haifa	1–1
2012–13	Europa League	Group	Lyon	France	22 November 2012	Stadion Letná, Prague	1–1
2012–13	Europa League	Group	Athletic Bilbao	Spain	6 December 2012	San Mamés, Bilbao	0–0
2012–13	Europa League	Round of 32	Chelsea	England	14 February 2013	Stadion Letná, Prague	0–1
2012–13	Europa League	Round of 32	Chelsea	England	21 February 2013	Stamford Bridge, London	1–1
2013–14	Europa League	Q2	Häcken	Sweden	18 July 2013	Stadion Letná, Prague	2–2
2013–14	Europa League	Q2	Häcken	Sweden	25 July 2013	Ullevi, Gothenburg	0–1
2014–15	Champions League	Q2	Levadia Tallinn	Estonia	15 July 2014	Stadion Letná, Prague	7–0
2014–15	Champions League	Q2	Levadia Tallinn	Estonia	22 July 2014	Kadriorg Stadium, Tallinn	1–1
2014–15	Champions League	Q3	Malmö FF	Sweden	29 July 2014	Stadion Letná, Prague	4–2
2014–15	Champions League	Q3	Malmö FF	Sweden	6 August 2014	Swedbank Stadion, Malmö	0–2 (a)
2014–15	Europa League	PO	PEC Zwolle	Netherlands	21 August 2014	IJsseldelta Stadion, Zwolle	1–1
2014–15	Europa League	PO	PEC Zwolle	Netherlands	28 August 2014	Stadion Letná, Prague	3–1
2014–15	Europa League	Group	Napoli	Italy	18 September 2014	Stadio San Paolo, Naples	1–3
2014–15	Europa League	Group	Young Boys	Switzerland	2 October 2014	Stadion Letná, Prague	3–1
2014–15	Europa League	Group	Slovan Bratislava	Slovakia	23 October 2014	Štadión Pasienky, Bratislava	3–0
2014–15	Europa League	Group	Slovan Bratislava	Slovakia	6 November 2014	Stadion Letná, Prague	4–0
2014–15	Europa League	Group	Napoli	Italy	27 November 2014	Stadion Letná, Prague	0–0
2014–15	Europa League	Group	Young Boys	Switzerland	11 December 2014	Stade de Suisse, Bern	0–2
2015–16	Champions League	Q3	CSKA Moscow	Russia	28 July 2015	Arena Khimki, Khimki	2–2
2015–16	Champions League	Q3	CSKA Moscow	Russia	4 August 2015	Stadion Letná, Prague	2–3
2015–16	Europa League	PO	Thun	Switzerland	20 August 2015	Stadion Letná, Prague	3–1
2015–16	Europa League	PO	Thun	Switzerland	27 August 2015	Stockhorn Arena, Thun	3–3
2015–16	Europa League	Group	Asteras Tripolis	Greece	17 September 2015	Theodoros Kolokotronis Stadium, Tripoli	1–1
2015–16	Europa League	Group	APOEL	Cyprus	1 October 2015	Stadion Letná, Prague	2–0
2015–16	Europa League	Group	Schalke 04	Germany	22 October 2015	Veltins-Arena, Gelsenkirchen	2–2
2015–16	Europa League	Group	Schalke 04	Germany	5 November 2015	Stadion Letná, Prague	1–1
2015–16	Europa League	Group	Asteras Tripolis	Greece	26 November 2015	Stadion Letná, Prague	1–0
2015–16	Europa League	Group	APOEL	Cyprus	10 December 2015	GSP Stadium, Nicosia	3–1
2015–16	Europa League	Round of 32	Krasnodar	Russia	18 February 2016	Stadion Letná, Prague	1–0
2015–16	Europa League	Round of 32	Krasnodar	Russia	25 February 2016	Kuban Stadium, Krasnodar	3–0
2015–16	Europa League	Round of 16	Lazio	Italy	10 March 2016	Stadion Letná, Prague	1–1
2015–16	Europa League	Round of 16	Lazio	Italy	17 March 2016	Stadio Olimpico, Rome	3–0
2015–16	Europa League	QF	Villarreal	Spain	7 April 2016	Estadio El Madrigal, Villarreal	1–2
2015–16	Europa League	QF	Villarreal	Spain	14 April 2016	Stadion Letná, Prague	2–4
2016–17	Champions League	Q3	Steaua București	Romania	26 July 2016	Stadion Letná, Prague	1–1
2016–17	Champions League	Q3	Steaua București	Romania	3 August 2016	Arena Națională, Bucharest	0–2
2016–17	Europa League	PO	SønderjyskE	Denmark	18 August 2016	Sydbank Park, Haderslev	0–0
2016–17	Europa League	PO	SønderjyskE	Denmark	25 August 2016	Stadion Letná, Prague	3–2
2016–17	Europa League	Group	Southampton	England	15 September 2016	St Mary's Stadium, Southampton	0–3
2016–17	Europa League	Group	Inter Milan	Italy	29 September 2016	Stadion Letná, Prague	3–1
2016–17	Europa League	Group	Hapoel Be'er Sheva	Israel	20 October 2016	Turner Stadium, Be'er Sheva	1–0
2016–17	Europa League	Group	Hapoel Be'er Sheva	Israel	3 November 2016	Stadion Letná, Prague	2–0
2016–17	Europa League	Group	Southampton	England	24 November 2016	Stadion Letná, Prague	1–0
2016–17	Europa League	Group	Inter Milan	Italy	8 December 2016	San Siro, Milan	1–2
2016–17	Europa League	Round of 32	Rostov	Russia	16 February 2017	Olimp-2, Rostov	0–4
2016–17	Europa League	Round of 32	Rostov	Russia	23 February 2017	Stadion Letná, Prague	1–1
2017–18	Europa League	Q3	Red Star Belgrade	Serbia	27 July 2017	Stadion Rajko Mitić, Belgrade	0–2
2017–18	Europa League	Q3	Red Star Belgrade	Serbia	4 August 2017	Stadion Letná, Prague	0–1
2018–19	Europa League	Q2	Spartak Subotica	Serbia	26 July 2018	Karađorđe Stadium, Novi Sad	0–2
2018–19	Europa League	Q2	Spartak Subotica	Serbia	2 August 2018	Stadion Letná, Prague	2–1
2019–20	Europa League	Q3	Trabzonspor	Turkey	8 August 2019	Stadion Letná, Prague	2–2
2019–20	Europa League	Q3	Trabzonspor	Turkey	15 August 2019	Medical Park Stadyumu, Trabzon	1–2
2020–21	Europa League	Group	Lille	France	22 October 2020	Stadion Letná, Prague	1–4
2020–21	Europa League	Group	Milan	Italy	29 October 2020	San Siro, Milan	0–3
2020–21	Europa League	Group	Celtic	Scotland	5 November 2020	Celtic Park, Glasgow	4–1
2020–21	Europa League	Group	Celtic	Scotland	26 November 2020	Stadion Letná, Prague	4–1
2020–21	Europa League	Group	Lille	France	3 December 2020	Stade Pierre-Mauroy, Villeneuve-d'Ascq	1–2
2020–21	Europa League	Group	Milan	Italy	10 December 2020	Stadion Letná, Prague	0–1
2021–22	Champions League	Q2	Rapid Wien	Austria	20 July 2021	Allianz Stadion, Vienna	1–2
2021–22	Champions League	Q2	Rapid Wien	Austria	28 July 2021	Stadion Letná, Prague	2–0
2021–22	Champions League	Q3	Monaco	France	3 August 2021	Stadion Letná, Prague	0–2
2021–22	Champions League	Q3	Monaco	France	10 August 2021	Stade Louis II, Monaco	1–3
2021–22	Europa League	Group	Brøndby	Denmark	16 September 2021	Brøndby Stadium, Brøndbyvester	0–0
2021–22	Europa League	Group	Rangers	Scotland	30 September 2021	Stadion Letná, Prague	1–0
2021–22	Europa League	Group	Lyon	France	21 October 2021	Stadion Letná, Prague	3–4
2021–22	Europa League	Group	Lyon	France	4 November 2021	Parc Olympique Lyonnais, Décines-Charpieu	0–3
2021–22	Europa League	Group	Rangers	Scotland	25 November 2021	Ibrox Stadium, Glasgow	0–2
2021–22	Europa League	Group	Brøndby	Denmark	9 December 2021	Stadion Letná, Prague	2–0
2021–22	Europa Conference League	KRPO	Partizan	Serbia	17 February 2022	Stadion Letná, Prague	0–1
2021–22	Europa Conference League	KRPO	Partizan	Serbia	24 February 2022	Partizan Stadium, Belgrade	1–2
2022–23	Europa Conference League	Q2	Viking	Norway	21 July 2022	Stadion Letná, Prague	0–0
2022–23	Europa Conference League	Q2	Viking	Norway	28 July 2022	Viking Stadion	1–2
2023–24	Champions League	Q3	Copenhagen	Denmark	8 August 2023	Parken, Copenhagen	0–0
2023–24	Champions League	Q3	Copenhagen	Denmark	15 August 2023	epet ARENA, Prague	3–3 (a.e.t.) (2–4 pen.)
2023–24	Europa League	PO	Dinamo Zagreb	Croatia	24 August 2023	Stadion Maksimir, Zagreb	1–3
2023–24	Europa League	PO	Dinamo Zagreb	Croatia	31 August 2023	epet ARENA, Prague	4–1
2023–24	Europa League	Group	Aris Limassol	Cyprus	21 September 2023	Stadion Letná, Prague	3–2
2023–24	Europa League	Group	Real Betis	Spain	5 October 2023	Benito Villamarín, Seville	1–2
2023–24	Europa League	Group	Rangers	Scotland	26 October 2023	Stadion Letná, Prague	0–0
2023–24	Europa League	Group	Rangers	Scotland	9 November 2023	Ibrox Stadium, Glasgow	1–2
2023–24	Europa League	Group	Real Betis	Spain	30 November 2023	Stadion Letná, Prague	1–0
2023–24	Europa League	Group	Aris Limassol	Cyprus	14 December 2023	Alphamega Stadium, Limassol	3–1
2023–24	Europa League	KRPO	Galatasaray	Turkey	15 February 2024	Rams Park, Istanbul	2–3
2023–24	Europa League	KRPO	Galatasaray	Turkey	22 February 2024	Stadion Letná, Prague	4–1
2023–24	Europa League	Round of 16	Liverpool	England	7 March 2024	Stadion Letná, Prague	1–5
2023–24	Europa League	Round of 16	Liverpool	England	14 March 2024	Anfield, Liverpool	1–6
2024–25	Champions League	Q2	Shamrock Rovers	Republic of Ireland	23 July 2024	Tallaght Stadium, Dublin	2–0
2024–25	Champions League	Q2	Shamrock Rovers	Republic of Ireland	30 July 2024	Stadion Letná, Prague	4–2
2024–25	Champions League	Q3	FCSB	Romania	6 August 2024	Stadion Letná, Prague	1–1
2024–25	Champions League	Q3	FCSB	Romania	13 August 2024	Steaua Stadium, Bucharest	3–2
2024–25	Champions League	PO	Malmö FF	Sweden	21 August 2024	Eleda Stadion, Malmö	2–0
2024–25	Champions League	PO	Malmö FF	Sweden	27 August 2024	Stadion Letná, Prague	2–0
2024–25	Champions League	LP	Red Bull Salzburg	Austria	18 September 2024	Stadion Letná, Prague	3–0
2024–25	Champions League	LP	VfB Stuttgart	Germany	1 October 2024	MHPArena, Stuttgart	1–1
2024–25	Champions League	LP	Manchester City	England	23 October 2024	City of Manchester Stadium, Manchester	0–5
2024–25	Champions League	LP	Brest	France	6 November 2024	Stadion Letná, Prague	1–2
2024–25	Champions League	LP	Atlético Madrid	Spain	26 November 2024	Stadion Letná, Prague	0–6
2024–25	Champions League	LP	Feyenoord	Netherlands	11 December 2024	De Kuip, Rotterdam	2–4
2024–25	Champions League	LP	Inter Milan	Italy	22 January 2025	Stadion Letná, Prague	0–1
2024–25	Champions League	LP	Bayer Leverkusen	Germany	29 January 2025	BayArena, Leverkusen	0–2
2025–26	Conference League	Q2	Aktobe	Kazakhstan	24 July 2025	Central Stadium, Aktobe	1–2
2025–26	Conference League	Q2	Aktobe	Kazakhstan	31 July 2025	Stadion Letná, Prague	4–0
2025–26	Conference League	Q3	Ararat-Armenia	Armenia	7 August 2025	Stadion Letná, Prague	4–1
2025–26	Conference League	Q3	Ararat-Armenia	Armenia	14 August 2025	Yerevan Football Academy Stadium, Yerevan	2–1
2025–26	Conference League	PO	Riga	Latvia	21 August 2025	Stadion Letná, Prague	2–0
2025–26	Conference League	PO	Riga	Latvia	27 August 2025	Skonto Stadium, Riga	0–1
2025–26	Conference League	LP	Shamrock Rovers	Republic of Ireland	2 October 2025	Stadion Letná, Prague	4–1
2025–26	Conference League	LP	Rijeka	Croatia	23 October 2025	Stadion Rujevica, Rijeka	0–1
2025–26	Conference League	LP	Raków Częstochowa	Poland	6 November 2025	Stadion Letná, Prague	0–0
2025–26	Conference League	LP	Legia Warsaw	Poland	27 November 2025	Polish Army Stadium, Warsaw	1–0
2025–26	Conference League	LP	Universitatea Craiova	Romania	11 December 2025	Ion Oblemenco Stadium, Craiova	2–1
2025–26	Conference League	LP	Aberdeen	Scotland	18 December 2025	Stadion Letná, Prague	3–0
2025–26	Conference League	Round of 16	AZ	Netherlands	12 March 2026	AFAS Stadion, Alkmaar	1–2
2025–26	Conference League	Round of 16	AZ	Netherlands	19 March 2026	Stadion Letná, Prague	0–4
2026–27	Champions League	Q3	Lyon	France	4 August 2026	Stadion Letná, Prague	2–1
2026–27	Champions League	Q3	Lyon	France	11 August 2026	Parc Olympique Lyonnais, Décines-Charpieu	0–3
