= Freddie Benson =

Freddie Benson is the name of:

- Fred Benson (born 1984), Dutch-Ghanaian football player
- Freddie Benson (iCarly)
- Freddy Benson (Dirty Rotten Scoundrels)
