= Joãozinho (footballer, born 1989) =

Portuguese footballer

Personal information
- Full name: João Carlos Reis Graça
- Date of birth: 2 July 1989 (age 37)
- Place of birth: Lisbon, Portugal
- Height: 1.85 m (6 ft 1 in)
- Position: Left-back

Team information
- Current team: Oriental

Youth career
- 1998–2007: Olivais Sul
- 2007–2008: Olivais Moscavide

Senior career*
Years	Team	Apps	(Gls)
2008–2009	Olivais Moscavide	30	(3)
2009–2011	Mafra	55	(2)
2011–2013	Beira-Mar	40	(1)
2013	→ Sporting CP (loan)	13	(0)
2013–2016	Braga	13	(0)
2013–2014	Braga B	5	(1)
2014	→ Sheriff (loan)	4	(0)
2014–2015	→ Astra Giurgiu (loan)	4	(1)
2015–2016	→ União Madeira (loan)	29	(0)
2016–2017	Kortrijk	25	(0)
2017–2019	Tondela	65	(0)
2019–2020	APOEL	5	(0)
2020–2023	Estoril	104	(2)
2023–2024	Torreense	25	(0)
2024–	Oriental	59	(6)
- * Club domestic league appearances and goals as of 19:17, 7 November 2026 (UTC)

João Carlos Reis Graça (born 2 July 1989), known as Joãozinho, is a Portuguese professional footballer who plays as a left-back for Clube Oriental de Lisboa.

== Club career ==
Born in Lisbon, Joãozinho finished his development in the area with C.D. Olivais e Moscavide. His first years as a senior were spent with that club and neighbouring C.D. Mafra, always in the third division.

Joãozinho moved straight to the Primeira Liga in the summer of 2011 after signing with S.C. Beira-Mar, initially on loan. He made his debut in the competition on 14 August, coming on as a second-half substitute in a 0–0 away draw against C.S. Marítimo. He finished the season with 26 appearances (24 starts), helping his team to finish 12th and thus avoid relegation.

On 15 December 2012, Joãozinho scored his first goal in the Portuguese top flight, closing the 3–1 home win over Rio Ave FC. He was loaned to Sporting CP the following 21 January, with the option to make the move permanent for €1 million in June. This did not come to fruition, and he agreed to a five-year contract at S.C. Braga, being sparingly played until the departure of Elderson Echiéjilé to AS Monaco FC.

On 22 July 2014, Joãozinho joined FC Sheriff Tiraspol from Moldova on a year-long loan deal. After only six weeks, he left for Romanian side FC Astra Giurgiu also on loan.

For the 2015–16 campaign, still owned by Braga, Joãzinho signed with C.F. União. In the following off-season, he agreed to a permanent two-year contract at KV Kortrijk from the Belgian Pro League.

Joãozinho returned to Portugal and its top tier on 6 June 2017, with the free agent joining C.D. Tondela on a two-year deal. In January 2020, following a very brief spell in the Cypriot First Division, he moved to G.D. Estoril Praia.

On 2 August 2023, aged 34, Joãozinho returned to the Liga Portugal 2 by signing for S.C.U. Torreense.

== Career statistics ==
As of match played on 30 March 2018

Appearances and goals by club, season and competition
Club	Season	League			Cup		League Cup		Other		Total	
Club	Season	Division	Apps	Goals	Apps	Goals	Apps	Goals	Apps	Goals	Apps	Goals
Beira-Mar	2011–12	Primeira Liga	26	0	0	0	2	0	—		28	0
Beira-Mar	2012–13	Primeira Liga	14	1	2	0	3	0	—		19	1
Beira-Mar	Total		40	1	2	0	5	0	0	0	47	1
Sporting CP (loan)	2012–13	Primeira Liga	13	0	0	0	—				13	0
Braga	2013–14	Primeira Liga	13	0	2	0	3	0	2	0	20	0
Braga B	2013–14	Segunda Liga	5	1	—						5	1
Sheriff (loan)	2014–15	Moldovan National Division	4	0	0	0	—		4	0	8	0
Astra (loan)	2014–15	Liga I	4	1	1	0	—		1	0	6	1
União Madeira (loan)	2015–16	Primeira Liga	29	0	1	0	—				30	0
Kortrijk	2016–17	Belgian Pro League	25	0	2	0	—		1	0	28	0
Tondela	2017–18	Primeira Liga	25	0	0	0	1	0	—		26	0
Career totals			158	3	8	0	9	0	8	0	183	3

== Honours ==
APOEL

- Cypriot Super Cup: 2019

Estoril

- Liga Portugal 2: 2020–21
