= List of football stadiums in Moldova =

The following is a list of football stadiums in Moldova, ranked in order of capacity, with the minimum capacity being 1,000.

== Current stadiums ==
#	Image	Stadium	Capacity	City	Home team	Opened
1		Sheriff Arena	12,746	Tiraspol	FC Sheriff Tiraspol	2002
2		Zimbru Stadium	10,104	Chişinău	Moldova, FC Zimbru	2006
3		Moldova Stadium	8,550	Speia	Demolished since 2018	-
4		Republican Stadium	8,084	Chişinău	Demolished since 2007	1952
5		Malaya Sportivnaya Arena	8,000	Tiraspol	FC Sheriff-2 Tiraspol	2002
6		Dinamo Stadium	5,061	Bender	FC Dinamo Bender	2006
7		Stadionul Viktor Mumzhiev	5,000	Comrat	FC Olimp Comrat	2012
8		Bălți City Stadium	5,000	Bălţi	FC Olimpia Bălţi	1955
9		Dinamo Stadium	3,000	Chişinău	FC Politehnica Chişinău	-
10		Orhei Regional Sport Complex	2,539	Orhei	FC Milsami	-
11		Rîbnița City Stadium	2,000	Rîbnița	FC Iskra-Stali Rîbnița	-
12		Ceadîr-Lunga Stadium	2,000	Ceadir-Lunga	FC Saxan	1956(Renewed 2012)
13		Călărășeuca Stadium	2,000	Otaci	FC Nistru Otaci	-
14		Ghidighici Stadium	1,500	Ghidighici	FC Rapid Ghidighici	2006
15		Suruceni Stadium	1,000	Suruceni	FC Sfîntul Gheorghe	2009

== See also ==
- List of European stadiums by capacity
- List of association football stadiums by capacity
- Lists of stadiums
