= Leonid Tcaci =

Moldavian footballer and manager

Personal information
- Full name: Leonid Tcaci
- Date of birth: 16 May 1970 (age 56)
- Place of birth: Bălți, Moldavian SSR
- Height: 1.75 m (5 ft 9 in)

Team information
- Current team: FC Zaria Bălți

Managerial career
- Years: Team
- 2014–2015: FC Zaria Bălți
- ‡ National team caps and goals as of 6 February 2015

Leonid Tcaci (born 16 May 1970) is a Moldovan professional football manager and former footballer. Since November 2014 he is the head coach of Moldavian football club FC Zaria Bălți.
