= Serghei Pașcenco =

Moldovan footballer

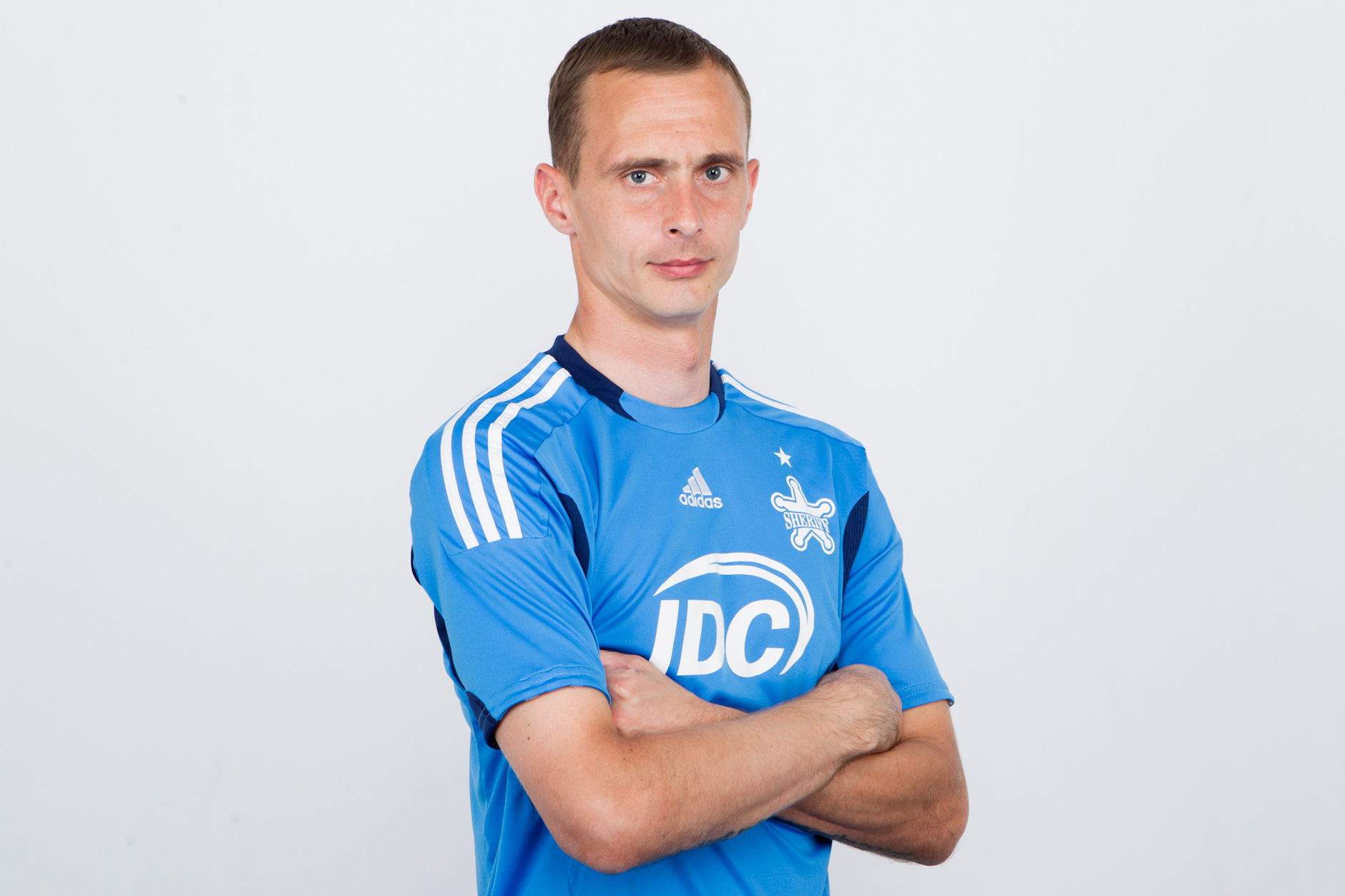
- Pașcenco in 2014

Personal information
- Full name: Serghei Pașcenco
- Date of birth: 18 December 1982 (age 43)
- Place of birth: Tiraspol, Moldavian SSR, Soviet Union
- Height: 1.87 m (6 ft 2 in)
- Position: Goalkeeper

Senior career*
Years	Team	Apps	(Gls)
2001	Sheriff-2 Tiraspol	0	(0)
2001	Constructorul Chișinău	2	(0)
2002	Sheriff Tiraspol	9	(0)
2003	Tiraspol	17	(0)
2004–2007	Sheriff Tiraspol	68	(0)
2008–2009	Alania Vladikavkaz	1	(0)
2010	Dinamo Bender	3	(2)
2010	Olimpia Bălți	20	(1)
2011	Gazovik Orenburg	5	(0)
2011–2012	Olimpia Bălți	27	(0)
2012–2014	Malavan	37	(0)
2014–2015	Sheriff Tiraspol	18	(0)
2015	Malavan	12	(0)
2016–2018	Zaria Bălți	45	(0)
2018–2024	Sheriff Tiraspol	17	(0)

International career^{‡}
2005–2018	Moldova	18	(0)
- * Club domestic league appearances and goals as of 11:00, 15 June 2024 (UTC) ‡ National team caps and goals as of 07:38, 30 March 2021 (UTC)

Serghei Pașcenco (born 18 December 1982) is a Moldovan former professional footballer who played as a goalkeeper, most notably for Moldovan National Division club Sheriff Tiraspol and the Moldova national team.

== Career ==
=== Club ===
Pașcenco signed a three-year contract with Alania Vladikavkaz side at the start of 2008 season. Pașcenco joined Iranian side Malavan in 2012.

On 26 June 2014, Pașcenco returned to Sheriff Tiraspol for a third spell at the club, leaving the club at the end of his contract in June 2015.

On 5 January 2018, Pașcenco returned to Sheriff Tiraspol for the fourth time. On 13 June 2024, Sheriff Tiraspol announced that Pașcenco would retire at the end June 2024 when his playing contract with the club expires, and would take up the role of Sports Director with the club.

=== International ===
Pașcenco received his first call-up to Moldova in 2003.

== Career statistics ==
=== Club ===
As of match played 10 November 2018

Appearances and goals by club, season and competition
Club	Season	League			National Cup		League Cup		Continental		Other		Total	
Club	Season	Division	Apps	Goals	Apps	Goals	Apps	Goals	Apps	Goals	Apps	Goals	Apps	Goals
Malavan	2012–13	Persian Gulf Cup	22	0			-		-		-		22	0
Malavan	2013–14	Persian Gulf Cup	15	0			-		-		-		15	0
Malavan	Total		37	0			-	-	-	-	0	0	37	0
Sheriff Tiraspol	2014–15	Moldovan National Division	18	0	2	0	—		—		1 (Note: Appearances in the Moldovan Super Cup)	0	21	0
Malavan	2015–16	Persian Gulf Pro League	12	0			-		-		-		12	0
Zaria Bălți	2015–16	Moldovan National Division	8	0	1	0	-		-		-		9	0
Zaria Bălți	2016–17	Moldovan National Division	21	0	3	0	-		1 (Note: Appearances in the UEFA Europa League)	0	1	0	26	0
Zaria Bălți	2017	Moldovan National Division	16	0	0	0	-		4	0	-		20	0
Zaria Bălți	Total		45	0	4	0	-	-	5	0	0	0	54	0
Sheriff Tiraspol	2018	Moldovan National Division	17	0	2	0	-		5 (Note: One appearance in the UEFA Champions League, four appearances in the UEFA Europa League)	0	-		24	0
Sheriff Tiraspol	2019	Moldovan National Division	0	0	0	0	-		0 (Note: Zero appearances in the UEFA Champions League, zero appearances in the UEFA Europa League)	0	0	0	0	0
Sheriff Tiraspol	2020–21	Moldovan National Division	0	0	0	0	-		0	0	-		0	0
Sheriff Tiraspol	2021–22	Moldovan National Division	0	0	0	0	-		0 (Note: Appearances in the UEFA Champions League)	0	0	0	0	0
Sheriff Tiraspol	Total		17	0	2	0	-	-	5	0	0	0	24	0
Career total			99	0	8	0	-	-	10	0	2	0	119	0

=== International ===
As of match played 26 February 2018

Appearances and goals by national team and year
National team	Year	Apps	Goals
Moldova	2005	1	0
Moldova	2006	5	0
Moldova	2007	5	0
Moldova	2008	0	0
Moldova	2009	0	0
Moldova	2010	0	0
Moldova	2011	0	0
Moldova	2012	1	0
Moldova	2013	3	0
Moldova	2014	0	0
Moldova	2015	0	0
Moldova	2016	0	0
Moldova	2017	2	0
Moldova	2018	1	0
Total		18	0
