= Maxim Antoniuc =

Moldovan footballer

Personal information
- Date of birth: 15 January 1991 (age 35)
- Place of birth: Chișinău, SSR Moldova, Soviet Union
- Height: 1.76 m (5 ft 9 1/2 in)
- Position: Right wing

Team information
- Current team: Olimp Comrat
- Number: 19

Youth career
- Zimbru Chișinău

Senior career*
Years	Team	Apps	(Gls)
2007–2011	Zimbru Chișinău	29	(6)
2011–2013	Iskra-Stal Rîbniţa	51	(12)
2013–2014	Veris Chișinău	29	(2)
2014–2015	Sheriff Tiraspol	13	(2)
2015	Buxoro	1	(0)
2016–2017	Academia Chișinău	20	(0)
2017	Petrocub Hîncești	11	(0)
2017–2021	Milsami Orhei	74	(7)
2021–2023	Lichtenauer FV	61	(12)
2024	SBV Kassel		
2024–2025	Speranis Nisporeni		
2025–	Olimp Comrat	0	(0)

International career^{‡}
2011–2012	Moldova U21	7	(0)
2013–2015	Moldova	6	(0)
- * Club domestic league appearances and goals as of 25 April 2026 ‡ National team caps and goals as of 10:04, 1 June 2021 (UTC)

Maxim Antoniuc (born 15 January 1991) is a Moldovan footballer who plays for Moldovan Liga 2 club Olimp Comrat. He previously played for Zimbru Chișinău and Iskra-Stal Rîbniţa, among others.

He is the brother of Moldova international footballer Alexandru Antoniuc
