= Leonel Olímpio =

Brazilian footballer

Personal information
- Full name: Leonel Olímpio
- Date of birth: 7 July 1982 (age 44)
- Place of birth: Jaguariaíva, Brazil
- Height: 1.84 m (6 ft 0 in)
- Position: Midfielder

Senior career*
Years	Team	Apps	(Gls)
2005	União Barbarense		
2005–2006	Mladá Boleslav	0	(0)
2006	CRB	4	(0)
2007	Villa Rio		
2007	Ituiutaba		
2008	América-RN		
2008–2009	Gil Vicente	28	(2)
2009–2011	Paços Ferreira	57	(2)
2011–2014	Vitória Guimarães	71	(4)
2014	Vitória Guimarães B	1	(0)
2014–2015	Sheriff	20	(2)
2016	Toledo Work	10	(0)
2016–2018	Varzim	52	(1)
2018–2019	União Leiria	46	(4)
Total		289	(15)
- * Club domestic league appearances and goals

Leonel Olímpio (born 7 July 1982 in Jaguariaíva, Paraná) is a Brazilian former professional footballer who played as a defensive midfielder.

== Honours ==
Paços Ferreira

- Taça da Liga runner-up: 2010–11

Vitória Guimarães

- Taça de Portugal: 2012–13
- Supertaça Cândido de Oliveira runner-up: 2011, 2013
