= Ivan Burduniuc =

Moldavian footballer and manager

Personal information
- Full name: Ivan Burduniuc
- Date of birth: 5 January 1981 (age 45)
- Place of birth: Ceadîr Lunga, Moldavian SSR
- Height: 1.75 m (5 ft 9 in)

Team information
- Current team: FC Saxan

Managerial career
- Years: Team
- 2011: FC Saxan
- ‡ National team caps and goals as of 22 May 2015

Ivan Burduniuc (born 5 January 1981) is a Moldavian professional football manager and former footballer. Since July 2011 he is the head coach of Moldavian football club FC Saxan.
