= Irakli Goginashvili =

Georgian footballer

Personal information
- Full name: Irakli Goginashvili
- Date of birth: 29 March 1994 (age 32)
- Place of birth: Tbilisi, Georgia
- Height: 1.72 m (5 ft 7 1/2 in)
- Position: Midfielder

Team information
- Current team: FC Shevardeni-1906 Tbilisi

Senior career*
| Years | Team | Apps | (Gls) |
| 2013–2014 | Metalurgi Rustavi | 9 | (0) |
| 2014–2015 | Saxan | 25 | (4) |
| 2015 | Novi Pazar | 0 | (0) |
| 2015 | Saxan | 12 | (0) |
| 2016 | Sioni Bolnisi | 9 | (1) |
| 2016 | Rustavi | 4 | (0) |
| 2016 | Speranța Nisporeni | 4 | (0) |
| 2017 | Rustavi | 24 | (3) |
| 2018– | Shevardeni-1906 Tbilisi | 4 | (0) |

International career^{‡}
| 2013 | Georgia U-21 | 1 | (0) |
- * Club domestic league appearances and goals as of 2 September 2018 ‡ National team caps and goals as of 2 September 2018

Irakli Goginashvili (born 29 March 1994) is a Georgian football midfielder who most recently played for FC Shevardeni-1906 Tbilisi.

== Career ==
Born in Tbilisi, Georgia, Goginashvili started playing with FC Metalurgi Rustavi in the 2013–14 Umaglesi Liga. Next season he moved abroad to Moldova where he joined FC Saxan playing in the Moldovan National Division. The following summer, more precisely in June 2015, he left Moldova and signed with FK Novi Pazar playing in the Serbian SuperLiga. However at the end of the month Milorad Kosanović was dismissed as main coach and replaced by Petar Kurčubić which had a different concept for the team, and by August 14, 2015, Goginashvili was released by Novi Pazar and he resigned with FC Saxan. He played the first half of the 2015–16 Moldovan National Division with Saxan, and during winter-brak he returned home to Georgia by joining the top level side FC Sioni Bolnisi.

== Club statistics ==
- Total matches played in Moldavian First League: 25 matches - 4 goals
