= Fred Benson =

Ghanaian footballer

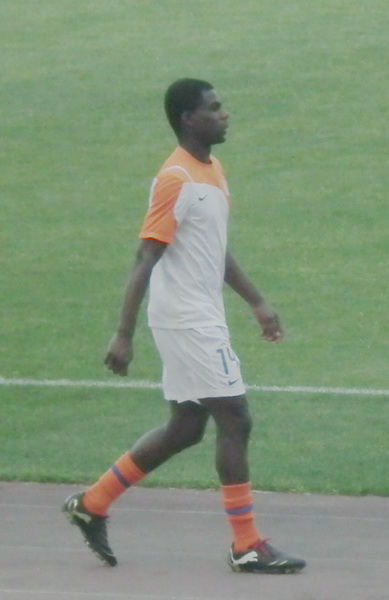

Personal information
- Full name: Fredua Buadee Benson Erchiah
- Date of birth: 10 April 1984 (age 42)
- Place of birth: Accra, Ghana
- Height: 1.75 m (5 ft 9 in)
- Position: Striker

Youth career
- FC Amstelland
- Zeeburgia
- Ajax
- Vitesse

Senior career*
Years	Team	Apps	(Gls)
2004–2007	Vitesse	62	(14)
2007–2011	RKC	114	(45)
2010	→ Shandong Luneng (loan)	7	(2)
2011–2012	Lechia Gdańsk	11	(1)
2012–2014	PEC Zwolle	61	(15)
2014	Sheriff Tiraspol	6	(1)
2015	Rapid București	13	(0)
2015–2016	IJsselmeervogels	18	(6)
2016–2017	RKC	23	(6)

International career
2006	Netherlands U21	1	(0)
Medal record
Men's football
Representing Netherlands
UEFA European Under-21 Championship
Winner	2006 Portugal
- * Club domestic league appearances and goals

Fredua Buadee Benson Erchiah (born 10 April 1984) is a former professional footballer who played as a striker. Born in Ghana, he represented Netherlands at youth international level.

== Club career ==
In January 2005 Benson was promoted to the Eredivisie team from Vitesse Arnhem. In two years, he played 62 games, scoring 14 goals before transferring to RKC Waalwijk in July 2007.

On 11 February 2010, it was announced that Benson had joined Shandong Luneng on a five-month-long loan deal.

In July 2011 Benson joined Lechia Gdańsk on a two-year contract. In total for Lechia he made 12 appearances, 11 of which came in the Ekstraklasa. His debut came against Jagiellonia Białystok, with his first and only goal coming against Cracovia, making him the first Lechia Gdańsk player and overall first player to score in the newly built PGE Arena Gdańsk. After a run of 10 games without a goal Benson was deemed as surplus to requirements and wasn't picked for the first training camp of the winter break. Knowing his time would be limited Benson chose to terminate his contract with mutual agreement in January 2012.

On 20 June 2014, Benson signed for Moldovan side FC Sheriff Tiraspol.

Six months later, on 23 January 2015, Benson left Sheriff Tiraspol by mutual consent. Shortly after leaving Sheriff Tiraspol, Benson signed a six-month contract with Rapid București.

In summer 2016, Benson returned to RKC after spending time in Dutch amateur football with IJsselmeervogels. Benson initially moved to ASV De Dijk on 25 January 2018, but the transfer was later rejected.

== International career ==
In 2006, he was part of the Netherlands squad that won the UEFA U-21 Championship 2006 in Portugal.

== Career statistics ==
=== Club ===
As of match played 19 December 2015

Appearances and goals by club, season and competition
Club	Season	League			National Cup		Continental		Other		Total	
Club	Season	Division	Apps	Goals	Apps	Goals	Apps	Goals	Apps	Goals	Apps	Goals
RKC Waalwijk	2007–08	Eerste Divisie	28	11			–		–		28	11
RKC Waalwijk	2008–09	Eerste Divisie	34	13			–		4	2	38	15
RKC Waalwijk	2009–10	Eredivisie	20	4			–		–		20	4
RKC Waalwijk	2010–11	Eerste Divisie	31	17	4	4	–		–		35	21
RKC Waalwijk	Total		113	45	4	4	-	-	4	2	121	51
Shandong Luneng Taishan (loan)	2010	Chinese Super League	7	2			5	1	–		12	3
Lechia Gdańsk	2011–12	Ekstraklasa	11	1	1	0	-		-		12	0
PEC Zwolle	2012–13	Eredivisie	32	8	5	4	-		-		37	12
PEC Zwolle	2013–14	Eredivisie	29	7	3	3	-		-		32	10
PEC Zwolle	Total		61	15	8	7	-	-	-	-	69	22
Sheriff Tiraspol	2014–15	Divizia Națională	5	1	2	2	4	1	1	0	12	4
Rapid București	2014–15	Liga I	13	0	0	0	-		-		13	0
IJsselmeervogels	2015–16	Topklasse	10	2	0	0	-		-		10	2
Career total			213	64	15	13	4	1	5	2	237	80

== Honours ==
RKC Waalwijk

- Eerste Divisie: 2010–11

PEC Zwolle

- KNVB Cup: 2013–14

Netherlands U21

- UEFA European Under-21 Championship: 2006
