= Veaceslav Semionov =

Moldavian footballer and manager (1956–2020)

Personal information
- Full name: Veaceslav Semionov
- Date of birth: 16 March 1956
- Place of birth: Bender, Moldavian SSR
- Date of death: 13 October 2020 (aged 64)
- Place of death: Bucharest, Romania
- Height: 1.80 m (5 ft 11 in)

Managerial career
- Years: Team
- 2010: FC Dacia Chişinău
- 2014–Jan 2015: FC Dacia Chişinău
- Mar–Apr 2015: FC Dacia Chişinău
- Aug 2015–2016: FC Dacia Chişinău
- 2017: FC Dinamo-Auto Tiraspol

Veaceslav Semionov (16 March 1956 – 13 October 2020) was a Moldovan professional football manager and former footballer. He was born in Bender.

For four spells he was the head coach of Moldavian football club FC Dacia Chişinău.
