= Vitalie Grijuc =

Moldavian footballer

Personal information
- Full name: Vitalie Grijuc
- Date of birth: 11 January 1994 (age 32)
- Place of birth: Bălți, Moldova
- Height: 1.75 m (5 ft 9 in)
- Position: Defender

Team information
- Current team: FC Grănicerul Glodeni

Youth career
- Zaria Bălți

Senior career*
Years	Team	Apps	(Gls)
2012–2017	FC Zaria Bălți	59	(0)
2017–	Grănicerul Glodeni		
- * Club domestic league appearances and goals as of 25 September 2017

Vitalie Grijuc (born 11 January 1994) is a Moldavian football defender who played in the Moldovan National Division for FC Zaria Bălți.

== Club statistics ==
- Total matches played in Moldavian First League: 59 matches - 0 goal
