= Volodymyr Zastavnyi =

Ukrainian footballer (born 1990)

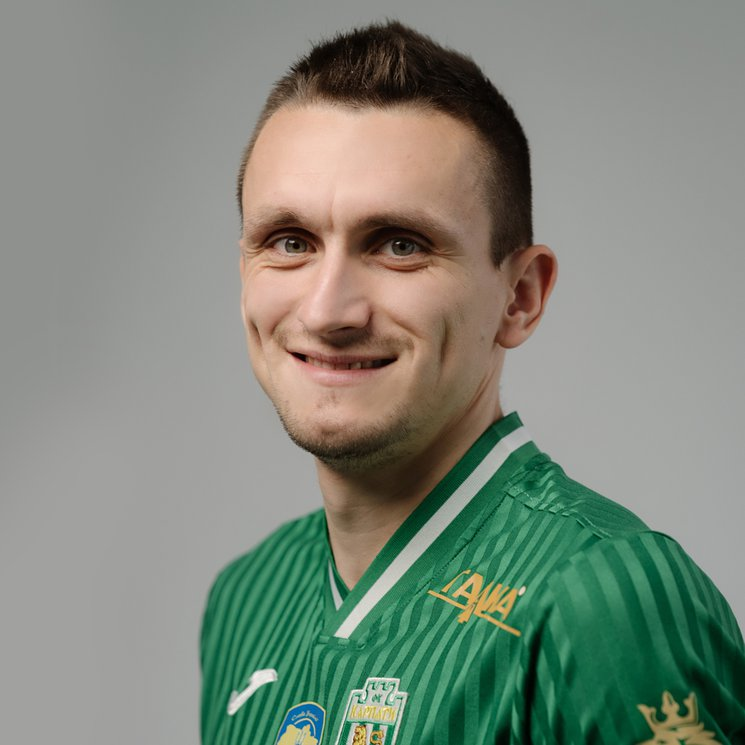

Personal information
- Full name: Volodymyr Andriyovych Zastavnyi
- Date of birth: 2 September 1990 (age 36)
- Place of birth: Lviv, Soviet Union (now Ukraine)
- Height: 1.72 m (5 ft 8 in)
- Position: Defender

Youth career
- 2005–2006: Rukh Vynnyky
- 2007: Skala Morshyn

Senior career*
Years	Team	Apps	(Gls)
2009	Enerhiya Lviv	6	(0)
2010	Zakarpattia Uzhhorod	3	(0)
2011	Beregvidek Berehove		
2011	Lviv	20	(0)
2012–2014	Zimbru Chișinău	35	(0)
2014–2017	Dacia Chișinău	75	(5)
2017–2021	Rukh Lviv	85	(2)
2021–2022	Karpaty Lviv	15	(2)
2022	Stará Říše		
2022–2023	Cosmos Nowotaniec	31	(2)
2023–2024	Resovia	17	(0)
2024–2026	JKS Jarosław	42	(2)
- * Club domestic league appearances and goals as of 21:30, 25 June 2026 (UTC)

Volodymyr Andriyovych Zastavnyi (Ukrainian: Володимир Андрійович Заставний; born 2 September 1990) is a Ukrainian professional footballer who plays as defender.

== Career ==
Zastavnyi is a product of two Lviv Oblast youth sportive schools. In February 2014 he signed contract with Moldavian Dacia Chișinău.

== Honours ==
Cosmos Nowotaniec

- IV liga Subcarpathia: 2022–23
- Polish Cup (Krosno regionals): 2022–23

JKS Jarosław

- IV liga Subcarpathia: 2025–26
