= Moldova Stadium (Speia) =

Stadionul Moldova was a sports stadium in Speia, Moldova. It had a capacity of 8,550 with approximately 3,300 seats, making it the fourth largest stadium in Moldova. The stadium is currently demolished and was the home ground of FC Dacia Chișinău.

46°54′48″N 26°55′47″E
