= 2009–10 FC Sheriff Tiraspol season =

Sheriff Tiraspol
2009–10 season
- President: Victor Gusan
- Manager: Andrei Sasnitski
- Moldovan National Division: 1st
- Moldovan Cup: Winners
- UEFA Champions League: Third qualifying round
- UEFA Europa League: Group stage
- Top goalscorer: League: Jymmy (13); All: Jymmy (18)

The 2009–10 Moldovan National Division season was FC Sheriff Tiraspol's 12th Moldovan National Division season, during which they retained the League and Cup titles. Sheriff were knocked out of the UEFA Champions League at the Third Qualifying round by Olympiacos, dropping into the UEFA Europa League, where they finished third in their group.

== Squad ==
As of match played 30 May 2010

No.	Name	Nationality	Position	Date of birth (age)	Signed from	Signed in	Contract ends	Apps.	Goals
Goalkeepers
12	Dmitri Stajila	(Moldova)	GK	5 February 1990 (aged 20)		2007			
25	Vladislav Stoyanov	(Bulgaria)	GK	8 June 1987 (aged 22)	Chernomorets Burgas	2010			
	Alexandru Melenciuc	(Moldova)	GK	20 March 1979 (aged 31)	Tiraspol	2006			
Defenders
5	Vazha Tarkhnishvili	(Georgia (country))	DF	25 August 1971 (aged 38)	Locomotive Tbilisi	1999			
6	Alexandru Scripcenco	(Moldova)	DF	13 January 1991 (aged 19)		2009			
13	Serghei Diulgher	(Moldova)	DF	21 March 1991 (aged 19)	Trainee	2008			
16	Artyom Khachaturov	(Moldova)	DF	18 June 1992 (aged 17)	Trainee	2009			
18	Constantin Arbănaș	(Romania)	DF	28 July 1983 (aged 26)	Gloria Bistrița	2006			
20	Rustam Tsynya	(Ukraine)	DF	17 June 1991 (aged 18)	Chornomorets Odesa	2007			
26	Miral Samardžić	(Slovenia)	DF	17 February 1987 (aged 23)	Maribor	2010			
28	Nadson	(Brazil)	DF	18 October 1984 (aged 25)	Nacional	2005			
30	Vladimir Branković	(Serbia)	DF	22 September 1985 (aged 24)	Partizan	2009			
	Vadim Costandachi	(Moldova)	DF	22 September 1991 (aged 18)	Trainee	2009			
Midfielders
3	Vladimir Volkov	(Serbia)	MF	6 June 1986 (aged 23)	OFK Beograd	2009			
7	Baćo Nikolić	(Montenegro)	MF	19 January 1986 (aged 24)	Lovćen	2009			
8	Serghei Gheorghiev	(Moldova)	MF	20 October 1991 (aged 18)	Trainee	2008			
10	Aleksandr Yerokhin	(Russia)	MF	13 October 1989 (aged 20)	Lokomotiv Moscow	2007			
11	Žarko Korać	(Montenegro)	MF	11 June 1987 (aged 22)	Zeta	2010			
14	Wilfried Balima	(Burkina Faso)	MF	20 March 1985 (aged 25)	US Ouagadougou	2005			
17	Florent Rouamba	(Burkina Faso)	MF	31 December 1986 (aged 23)	ASFA Yennenga	2006			
19	Marko Đurović	(Montenegro)	MF	8 May 1988 (aged 22)	Lovćen	2010			
22	Luis Antonio Rodríguez	(Argentina)	MF	4 March 1985 (aged 25)	Temperley	2008			
23	Eduard Hoderean	(Moldova)	MF	7 January 1990 (aged 20)	Trainee	2009			
27	Vitalie Bulat	(Moldova)	MF	14 September 1987 (aged 22)	Trainee	2003			
44	Miloš Adamović	(Serbia)	MF	19 June 1988 (aged 21)	OFK Beograd	2010			
Forwards
9	Jymmy	(Brazil)	FW	15 April 1984 (aged 26)	Spartak Trnava	2009			
21	Amath Diedhiou	(Senegal)	FW	19 November 1989 (aged 20)		2009			
	Constantin Mandrîcenco	(Moldova)	FW	19 February 1991 (aged 19)	Trainee	2008			
Players away on loan
4	Djibril Paye	(Guinea)	DF	26 February 1990 (aged 20)		2008			
15	Ihar Karpovich	(Belarus)	DF	2 August 1988 (aged 21)	Lida	2007			
	Fred	(Brazil)	MF	22 July 1986 (aged 23)					
Left during the season
1	Stanislav Namașco	(Moldova)	GK	10 November 1986 (aged 23)	Tiraspol	2008			
2	Serjão	(Brazil)	DF	17 September 1985 (aged 24)	CRAC	2008			
4	Andrei Verbetchi	(Moldova)	MF						
7	Andrei Corneencov	(Moldova)	MF	1 April 1982 (aged 28)	Tiraspol	2006			
11	Alexandru Suvorov	(Moldova)	MF	2 February 1987 (aged 23)	Tiraspol	2009			
19	Victor Truhanov	(Moldova)	MF	30 January 1991 (aged 19)	Trainee	2008			
24	Abdoul-Gafar Mamah	(Togo)	DF	24 August 1985 (aged 24)	US Ouagadougou	2005			
88	Aliaksei Kuchuk	(Belarus)	MF	9 September 1986 (aged 23)	loan from Kuban Krasnodar	2009			

=== Out on loan ===
Note: Flags indicate national team as defined under FIFA eligibility rules; some limited exceptions apply. Players may hold more than one non-FIFA nationality.

No.	Pos.	Nation	Player
4	DF	GUI	Djibril Paye (at Tiraspol)
15	DF	BLR	Ihar Karpovich (at Partizan Minsk)

No.	Pos.	Nation	Player
—	MF	BRA	Fred (at Tiraspol)

== Transfer ==
=== In ===
Date	Position	Nationality	Name	From	Fee	Ref.
Summer 2009	DF	(Ukraine)	Rustam Tsynya	Chornomorets Odesa	Undisclosed	
Summer 2009	MF	(Moldova)	Vadim Costandachi	Youth Team	Free	
Summer 2009	MF	(Moldova)	Andrei Verbetchi	Tiligul-Tiras Tiraspol	End of Season	
Summer 2009	MF	(Serbia)	Vladimir Branković	Partizan	Undisclosed	
Summer 2009	FW	(Brazil)	Jymmy	Spartak Trnava	Undisclosed	
Summer 2009	FW	(Senegal)	Amath Diedhiou			
Winter 2010	GK	(Bulgaria)	Vladislav Stoyanov	Chernomorets Burgas	Undisclosed	
Winter 2010	DF	(Slovenia)	Miral Samardžić	Maribor	Undisclosed	
Winter 2010	MF	(Moldova)	Eduard Hoderean	Tiraspol	Undisclosed	
Winter 2010	MF	(Montenegro)	Marko Đurović	Lovćen	Undisclosed	
Winter 2010	MF	(Montenegro)	Žarko Korać	Zeta	Undisclosed	
Winter 2010	MF	(Serbia)	Miloš Adamović	Beograd	Undisclosed	
Winter 2010	FW	(Montenegro)	Baćo Nikolić	Lovćen	Undisclosed	

=== Out ===
Date	Position	Nationality	Name	To	Fee	Ref.
15 July 2009	DF	(Togo)	Kwami Eninful	US Monastir	Undisclosed	
Summer 2009	DF	(Moldova)	Gheorghi Nicologlo	Tiraspol	Undisclosed	
Summer 2009	DF	(Moldova)	Ionuț Rada	FCM Bacău	Undisclosed	
Summer 2009	FW	(Moldova)	Serghei Alexeev	Aarau	Undisclosed	
Summer 2009	FW	(Moldova)	Igor Picușceac	Krasnodar	Undisclosed	
Winter 2010	GK	(Moldova)	Stanislav Namașco	Kuban Krasnodar	Undisclosed	
Winter 2010	DF	(Brazil)	Serjão	Mixto	Undisclosed	
Winter 2010	DF	(Togo)	Abdoul-Gafar Mamah	Alania Vladikavkaz	Undisclosed	
Winter 2010	MF	(Moldova)	Andrei Corneencov	Tobol	Undisclosed	
Winter 2010	MF	(Moldova)	Victor Truhanov	Iskra-Stal	Undisclosed	
Winter 2010	MF	(Moldova)	Andrei Verbetchi	Tiraspol	Undisclosed	
Winter 2010	FW	(Moldova)	Alexandru Suvorov	Cracovia	Undisclosed	

=== Loans in ===
Date from	Position	Nationality	Name	From	Date to	Ref.
Summer 2009	FW	(Belarus)	Aliaksei Kuchuk	Kuban Krasnodar	Winter 2010	

=== Loans out ===
Date from	Position	Nationality	Name	To	Date to	Ref.
Summer 2009	DF	(Guinea)	Djibril Paye	Tiraspol	End of Season	
Summer 2009	MF	(Brazil)	Fred	Tiraspol	End of Season	
Winter 2010	DF	(Belarus)	Ihar Karpovich	Partizan Minsk	Winter 2010	

== Competitions ==
=== National Division ===
==== Results summary ====
Overall								Home						Away					
Pld	W	D	L	GF	GA	GD	Pts	W	D	L	GF	GA	GD	W	D	L	GF	GA	GD
33	27	3	3	75	8	+67	84	16	1	0	46	2	+44	11	2	3	29	6	+23

==== Results ====
10 July 2009 2	CSCA-Rapid Chişinău	0–6	Sheriff Tiraspol	Ghidighici
18:00 EEST (UTC+3)	Rusu (red card) 69'	Report	Bulat 3'; Yerokhin 45', 53', 57'; Suvorov (yellow card) 62'; Mandricenco 63'; Rouamba (yellow card) 83'; Balima 89'	Stadium: Ghidighici Stadium; Attendance: 300; Referee: Vadim Dedeniov

25 July 2009 4	Sheriff Tiraspol	2–0	Sfântul Gheorghe	Tiraspol
20:00 EEST (UTC+3)	Truhanov 8'; Arbănaș (yellow card) 75'; Volkov 87' (pen.)	Report		Stadium: Sheriff Stadium; Attendance: 500; Referee: Vladimir Colbasiuc

10 August 2009 6	Sheriff Tiraspol	5–0	Iskra-Stal	Tiraspol
20:00 EEST (UTC+3)	Corneencov 13'; Rouamba 30'; Jymmy 33', 40'; Balima 47'; Arbănaș (yellow card) 52'; Volkov (yellow card) 81'	Report	A.Burcovschi (yellow card) 39'; O.Stakhiv (yellow card) 41'; Osipenco (yellow card) 58'; Zhurka (yellow card) 90'	Stadium: Sheriff Stadium; Attendance: 3,000; Referee: Vadim Dedeniov

22 August 2009 8	Sheriff Tiraspol	0–0	Dacia Chişinău	Tiraspol
20:00 EEST (UTC+3)	Tsynya (yellow card) 86'	Report	Habib (yellow card) 86'	Stadium: Sheriff Stadium; Attendance: 1,000; Referee: Veaceslav Banari

30 August 2009 9	Tiraspol	1–0	Sheriff Tiraspol	Tiraspol
20:00 EEST (UTC+3)	G.Nicologlo (yellow card) 37'; Pașcenco 49'; Paye (yellow card) 62'	Report	Suvorov (yellow card) 48'; Rodríguez (yellow card) 84'	Stadium: Sheriff Stadium; Attendance: 1,500; Referee: Gabriel Tupicico

7 September 2009 3	Sheriff Tiraspol	5–0	Dinamo Bender	Tiraspol
19:00 EEST (UTC+3)	Kuchuk 8', 88', 90'; Rodríguez (yellow card) 38'; Volkov 42'; Diedhiou 66'	Report	S.Agafonov (yellow card) 33'; A.Bîcov (yellow card) 60'	Stadium: Sheriff Stadium; Attendance: 1,000; Referee: Valeriu Sorochin

13 September 2009 10	Sheriff Tiraspol	3–0	FC Viitorul	Tiraspol
19:00 EEST (UTC+3)	Yerokhin 18'; Volkov 39'; Serjão 53'	Report	Pătraș (yellow card) 89'	Stadium: Sheriff Stadium; Attendance: 500; Referee: Veaceslav Banari

22 September 2009 11	Nistru Otaci	0–1	Sheriff Tiraspol	Călărășeuca
16:00 EEST (UTC+3)	I.Mostovei (yellow card) 83'	Report	Yerokhin 25'; Rouamba (yellow card) 83'	Stadium: Călărășeuca Stadium; Attendance: 500; Referee: Victor Gheciu

26 September 2009 12	Zimbru Chișinău	1–0	Sheriff Tiraspol	Chișinău
16:00 EEST (UTC+3)	P.Hvorosteanov (yellow card) 23'; Andronic 45' (yellow card) 90'; V.Sofroni (yellow card) 50'; A.Chirşul (yellow card) 90'	Report	A.Verbetchi (yellow card) 86'; Kuchuk (yellow card) 86'; Tarkhnishvili (yellow card) 90'	Stadium: Zimbru Stadium; Attendance: 2,000; Referee: Ghenadie Sidenco

6 October 2009 13	Sheriff Tiraspol	1–0	CSCA-Rapid Chişinău	Tiraspol
18:00 EEST (UTC+3)	Branković (yellow card) 53'; Yerokhin 60'; Kuchuk (yellow card) 66'	Report	Leucuță (yellow card) 30'; Romanenco (yellow card) 42'; Seul (yellow card) 45' (yellow-red card) 73'; M.Ciortan (yellow card) 61'	Stadium: Sheriff Stadium; Attendance: 600; Referee: Igor Şaţchii

11 October 2009 15	Sfântul Gheorghe	2–5	Sheriff Tiraspol	Suruceni
15:00 EEST (UTC+3)	Vremea 11'; Livandovschi 45'; G.Eremia (yellow card) 75'; Molla (yellow card) 80'	Report	Kuchuk 20', 52'; Diedhiou 42', 53'; Volkov (yellow card) 55'; Bulat 68'	Stadium: Suruceni Stadium; Attendance: 500; Referee: Victor Gheciu

18 October 2009 14	Dinamo Bender	0–5	Sheriff Tiraspol	Bender
15:00 EEST (UTC+3)		Report	Arbănaș (yellow card) 40' (yellow-red card) 89'; Yerokhin 43'; Diedhiou 44'; Kuchuk 54' (pen.), 60'; Corneencov (yellow card) 69'; Jymmy 75'; Bulat (yellow card) 80'	Stadium: Dinamo Stadium; Attendance: 600; Referee: Ghenadie Sidenco

28 October 2009 16	Sheriff Tiraspol	2–0	Olimpia Bălţi	Tiraspol
17:00 EET (UTC+2)	Kuchuk (yellow card) 38'; Balima 81'; Suvorov 88'	Report	Cheltuială (yellow card) 12'; T.Kourouma (yellow card) 76'; Sosnovschi (yellow card) 85'; S.Gusacov (red card) 87'	Stadium: Sheriff Stadium; Attendance: 300; Referee: Valeriu Sorochin

1 November 2009 17	Iskra-Stal	0–1	Sheriff Tiraspol	Rîbnița
14:00 EET (UTC+2)	O.Fistican (yellow card) 38'; R.Svetlichnyy (yellow card) 63'	Report	Rouamba (yellow card) 30'; Yerokhin 48'; Rodríguez (yellow card) 90'	Stadium: Stadionul Orășenesc; Attendance: 2,500; Referee: Vadim Dedeniov

10 November 2009 18	Sheriff Tiraspol	1–0	Academia Chișinău	Tiraspol
17:00 EET (UTC+2)	Branković (yellow card) 37' (goal) 67'; Nadson (yellow card) 44'; Tsynya (yellow card) 60'	Report		Stadium: Sheriff Stadium; Attendance: 300; Referee: Ghenadie Sidenco

18 November 2009 19	Dacia Chişinău	1–2	Sheriff Tiraspol	Chişinău
14:00 EET (UTC+2)	Onică (yellow card) 53'; Zgura 90'	Report	Nadson 39' (yellow card) 76'; Jymmy 45'; Mamah (yellow card) 47'; Branković (yellow card) 90'	Stadium: Dinamo Stadium; Attendance: 600; Referee: Vladislav Ivancenco

26 November 2009 7	Academia Chișinău	0–0	Sheriff Tiraspol	Chișinău
13:00 EET (UTC+2)	Ilescu (yellow card) 24'; Copeliciuc (yellow card) 33'	Report	Kuchuk (yellow card) 45'; Arbănaș (yellow card) 51'; Rouamba (yellow card) 74'; Mamah (yellow card) 85'	Stadium: Stadionul Dinamo; Attendance: 1,000; Referee: Igor Şaţchii

7 December 2009 1	Sheriff Tiraspol	3–0	Zimbru Chișinău	Tiraspol
17:00 EET (UTC+2)	Volkov (yellow card) 9' (goal) 49'; Branković 33'; Tarkhnishvili (yellow card) 68'; Arbănaș 82'	Report	A.Secrieru (yellow card) 17'; I.Popuşoi (yellow card) 72'	Stadium: Sheriff Stadium; Attendance: 500; Referee: Victor Gheciu

27 February 2010 5	Olimpia Bălţi	1–0	Sheriff Tiraspol	Tiraspol
14:00 EET (UTC+2)	Șișchin (yellow card) 31'; M.Paseciniuc 63'	Report	Đurović (yellow card) 16'; Balima (yellow card) 82'; Branković (yellow card) 90'	Stadium: Sheriff Stadium; Attendance: 500; Referee: Vadim Dedeniov

7 March 2010 20	Sheriff Tiraspol	2–0	Tiraspol	Tiraspol
14:00 EET (UTC+2)	O.Iastrebov 19' (o.g.); Gheorghiev 82'	Report	O.Iastrebov (yellow card) 48'; A.Verbeţchi (yellow card) 62'	Stadium: Sheriff Stadium; Attendance: 1,000; Referee: Iurie Covtun

13 March 2010 21	FC Viitorul	0–3	Sheriff Tiraspol	Orhei
14:00 EET (UTC+2)		Report	Diedhiou 10'; Tsynya (yellow card) 38'; Bulat 72'; Jymmy 80'	Stadium: CSR Orhei; Attendance: 600; Referee: Ghenadie Sidenco

17 March 2010 22	Sheriff Tiraspol	5–0	Nistru Otaci	Tiraspol
17:00 EET (UTC+2)	Adamović 5'; Volkov 17', 24', 82' (yellow card) 86'; Yerokhin 39'; Arbănaș (yellow card) 77'	Report	E.Lavrinovici (yellow card) 79'	Stadium: Sheriff Stadium; Attendance: 700; Referee: Vladimir Colbasiuc

21 March 2010 23	Sheriff Tiraspol	4–0	Nistru Otaci	Tiraspol
14:00 EET (UTC+2)	Jymmy 20', 31', 35' (pen.); Adamović 41'; Tsynya (yellow card) 60'	Report	V.Ucraineț (yellow card) 43'; V.Antonii (yellow card) 64'	Stadium: Sheriff Stadium; Attendance: 700; Referee: Dmitrii Muntean

26 March 2010 24	Sheriff Tiraspol	3–0	Iskra-Stal	Tiraspol
17:00 EET (UTC+2)	Tarkhnishvili (yellow card) 54'; Jymmy 56'; Yerokhin (yellow card) 62' (yellow-red card) 85'; Bulat (yellow card) 80'; Volkov 82'; Arbănaș (yellow card) 88'; Đurović 89'	Report	F.Emelyanov (yellow card) 14' (yellow-red card) 70'; Mihaliov (yellow card) 44'; Novicov (yellow card) 73'	Stadium: Sheriff Stadium; Attendance: 2,500; Referee: Iurie Covtun

3 April 2010 25	Dacia Chişinău	0–0	Sheriff Tiraspol	Chişinău
13:00 EEST (UTC+3)	Bursuc (yellow card) 45'; Arabadji (yellow card) 66'	Report	Nikolić (yellow card) 79'; Hoderean (yellow card) 83'	Stadium: Dinamo Stadium; Attendance: 500; Referee: Ghenadie Sidenco

10 April 2010 26	Sheriff Tiraspol	1–0	Olimpia Bălţi	Tiraspol
17:00 EEST (UTC+3)	Adamović (yellow card) 39'; Jymmy 52'	Report	Șișchin (yellow card) 37'; S.Gusacov (yellow card) 56'; Tcaciuc (yellow card) 58'	Stadium: Sheriff Stadium; Attendance: 3,000; Referee: Victor Gheciu

18 April 2010 27	Zimbru Chișinău	0–1	Sheriff Tiraspol	Chișinău
16:00 EEST (UTC+3)	Antoniuc (yellow card) 57'; Bezimov (yellow card) 85'	Report	Haceaturov (yellow card) 12'; Branković (yellow card) 60'; Rouamba 64'; Adamović (yellow card) 68'; Tsynya (yellow card) 90'	Stadium: Zimbru Stadium; Attendance: 8,000; Referee: Vladislav Ivancenco

24 April 2010 28	Sheriff Tiraspol	3–1	Rapid Ghidighici	Tiraspol
17:00 EEST (UTC+3)	Yerokhin 24' (yellow card) 30'; Gheorghiev 50'; Đurović (yellow card) 60'; Nikolić (yellow card) 72' (goal) 73'	Report	Franțuz (yellow card) 30'; V.Rusu (yellow card) 66'; Livandovschi 72'; Cojocari (yellow card) 90'	Stadium: Sheriff Stadium; Attendance: 300; Referee: Vladimir Colbasiuc

2 May 2010 29	Academia Chișinău	0–1	Sheriff Tiraspol	Chișinău
17:00 EEST (UTC+3)	Nikolayev (yellow card) 34'; Ciupercă (yellow card) 75'	Report	Yerokhin (yellow card) 41' (goal) 55'; Volkov (yellow card) 63'	Stadium: Stadionul Dinamo; Attendance: 1,000; Referee: Victor Gheciu

8 May 2010 30	Sheriff Tiraspol	3–1	FC Viitorul	Tiraspol
18:00 EEST (UTC+3)	Jymmy 24' (pen.); Branković (yellow card) 37'; Haceaturov (yellow card) 62'; Hoderean 83'; Volkov 85' (yellow card) 88'	Report	Dragovozov 50'; S.Mocanu (yellow card) 66'; I.Castraveţ (yellow card) 69'; V.Potlog (yellow card) 87'	Stadium: Sheriff Stadium; Attendance: 300; Referee: Ruslan Muntean

15 May 2010 31	Tiraspol	0–2	Sheriff Tiraspol	Tiraspol
19:00 EEST (UTC+3)	Paye (yellow card) 63'	Report	E.Celeadnic 35' (o.g.); Nadson 64'	Stadium: Sheriff Stadium; Attendance: 9,200; Referee: Iurie Covtun

19 May 2010 32	Sheriff Tiraspol	3–0	Dinamo Bender	Tiraspol
18:00 EEST (UTC+3)	Nikolić (yellow card) 7'; Jymmy 26', 32'; Diedhiou (yellow card) 39' (goal) 48'	Report	T.Romanets (yellow card) 31'	Stadium: Sheriff Stadium; Attendance: 2,000; Referee: Petru Stoianov

23 May 2010 33	Sfântul Gheorghe	0–2	Sheriff Tiraspol	Suruceni
17:00 EEST (UTC+3)	A.Martin (yellow card) 30'; P.Stîngă (yellow card) 67'; Istrati (yellow card) 75'	Report	Branković 27'; Hoderean (yellow card) 61'; Rouamba (yellow card) 67'; Jymmy (yellow card) 75'; Nadson 83'	Stadium: Suruceni Stadium; Attendance: 500; Referee: Vladislav Ivancenco

==== Table ====
Pos	Team	Pld	W	D	L	GF	GA	GD	Pts	Qualification or relegation
1	Sheriff Tiraspol (C)	33	27	3	3	75	8	+67	84	Qualification for the Champions League second qualifying round
2	Iskra-Stal Rîbnița	33	19	8	6	50	25	+25	65	Qualification for the Europa League second qualifying round (Note: Since Sheriff, winners of the 2009–10 Moldovan Cup, also won the league, Dacia will enter the first and Iskra-Stal the second qualifying round of the UEFA Europa League.)
3	Olimpia Bălți	33	17	9	7	45	23	+22	60	Qualification for the Europa League first qualifying round
4	Zimbru Chișinău	33	17	8	8	47	29	+18	59	
5	Dacia Chișinău	33	16	10	7	54	30	+24	58	Qualification for the Europa League first qualifying round

Source: Moldovan Football Federation (in Romanian)
Rules for classification: 1st points; 2nd head-to-head points; 3rd head-to-head goal difference; 4th goal difference; 5th goals scored; 6th number of wins; 7th Fair play competition
(C) Champions

=== Moldovan Cup ===
22 November 2009 Second round	Sheriff Tiraspol	5–0	CSCA-Rapid Chişinău	Tiraspol
17:00 EET (UTC+2)	Jymmy 8'; Corneencov 43', 89'; Balima 59'; Suvorov 73'	Report		Stadium: Sheriff Stadium

23 February 2010 Quarterfinal 1st leg	Sheriff Tiraspol	0–0	Academia Chișinău	Tiraspol
17:00 EET (UTC+2)		Report		Stadium: Sheriff Stadium

30 March 2010 Quarterfinal 2nd leg	Academia Chișinău	0–1 (a.e.t.) (0–1 agg.)	Sheriff Tiraspol	Chișinău
14:00 EEST (UTC+3)		Report	Rouamba 94'	Stadium: Stadionul Dinamo

14 April 2010 Semifinal 1st leg	Sheriff Tiraspol	0–0	Iskra-Stal	Tiraspol
17:00 EEST (UTC+3)		Report		Stadium: Sheriff Stadium

28 April 2010 Semifinal 2nd leg	Iskra-Stal	1–1 (1–1 (a) agg.)	Sheriff Tiraspol	Rîbnița
15:00 EEST (UTC+3)	Kilikevych 41'	Report	Jymmy 83'	Stadium: Stadionul Orășenesc

30 May 2010 Final	Dacia Chişinău	0–2	Sheriff Tiraspol	Chișinău
19:35 EEST (UTC+3)		Report	Jymmy 27', 52'	Stadium: Zimbru Stadium

=== UEFA Champions League ===
==== Qualifying stage ====
15 July 2009 Second qualifying round 1st leg	Inter Turku (Finland)	0–1	(Moldova) Sheriff Tiraspol	Kupittaa, Finland
18:30 EEST (UTC+3)	Purje (yellow card) 19'; Kauko (yellow card) 47'; Furuholm (yellow card) 64'; Paajanen (yellow card) 90+1'	Report	Suvorov 42' (pen.); Karpovich (yellow card) 68'	Stadium: Veritas Stadion; Attendance: 5,108; Referee: Zsolt Szabó (Hungary)

21 July 2009 Second qualifying round 2nd leg	Sheriff Tiraspol (Moldova)	1–0 (2–0 agg.)	(Finland) Inter Turku	Tiraspol, Moldova
EEST (UTC+3)	Bulat (yellow card) 52'; Suvorov 69' (pen.) (yellow card) 74'	Report	Bantamoi (yellow card) 68'; Ramírez (yellow card) 74'	Stadium: Sheriff Stadium; Attendance: 11,000; Referee: Carlos Velasco Carballo (Spain)

29 July 2009 Third qualifying round 1st leg	Sheriff Tiraspol (Moldova)	0–0	(Czech Republic) Slavia Prague	Tiraspol, Moldova
20:00 EEST (UTC+3)	Jymmy (yellow card) 78'	Report		Stadium: Sheriff Stadium; Attendance: 12,000; Referee: Alan Kelly (Ireland)

5 August 2009 Third qualifying round 2nd leg	Slavia Prague (Czech Republic)	1–1 (1–1 (a) agg.)	(Moldova) Sheriff Tiraspol	Prague, Czech Republic
21:00 EEST (UTC+3)	Hloušek 15'; Suchý (yellow card) 84'; Černý (yellow card) 89'	Report	Mamah (yellow card) 44'; Balima (yellow card) 71'; Nadson 90+3'	Stadium: Synot Tip Arena; Attendance: 13,483; Referee: Gianluca Rocchi (Italy)

18 August 2009 Play-off round 1st leg	Sheriff Tiraspol (Moldova)	0–2	(Greece) Olympiacos	Tiraspol, Moldova
21:45 EEST (UTC+3)	Tarkhnishvili (yellow card) 87'	Report	Bravo (yellow card) 45+3'; Dudu 46'; Domi (yellow card) 59'; Mitroglou 81'	Stadium: Sheriff Stadium; Attendance: 12,500; Referee: Martin Atkinson (England)

26 August 2009 Play-off round 2nd leg	Olympiacos (Greece)	1–0 (3–0 agg.)	(Moldova) Sheriff Tiraspol	Athens, Greece
21:45 EEST (UTC+3)	Mitroglou 82'	Report	Rodríguez (yellow card) 83'; Kuchuk (yellow card) 90'	Stadium: Karaiskakis Stadium; Attendance: 27,633; Referee: Alberto Undiano Mallenco (Spain)

=== UEFA Europa League ===
==== Group stage ====
Pos	Team	Pld	W	D	L	GF	GA	GD	Pts	Qualification	FEN	TWE	SHF	STE
1	(Turkey) Fenerbahçe	6	5	0	1	8	3	+5	15	Advance to knockout phase	—	1–2	1–0	3–1
2	(Netherlands) Twente	6	2	2	2	5	6	−1	8	Advance to knockout phase	0–1	—	2–1	0–0
3	(Moldova) Sheriff Tiraspol	6	1	2	3	4	5	−1	5		0–1	2–0	—	1–1
4	(Romania) Steaua București	6	0	4	2	3	6	−3	4		0–1	1–1	0–0	—

Source: Soccerway

17 September 2009 1	Steaua București (Romania)	0–0	(Moldova) Sheriff Tiraspol	Bucharest, Romania
22:05 EEST (UTC+3)	Ninu (yellow card) 88'	Report	Kuchuk (yellow card) 22'; Rodríguez (yellow card) 32'; Tsynya (yellow card) 81'	Stadium: Stadionul Steaua; Attendance: 0 ^{1} Referee: Pavel Královec (Czech Republic)

1 October 2009 2	Sheriff Tiraspol (Moldova)	0–1	(Turkey) Fenerbahçe	Tiraspol, Moldova
20:00 EEST (UTC+3)	Yerokhin (yellow card) 45'; Karpovich (yellow card) 78'	Report	Alex 53'	Stadium: Sheriff Stadium; Attendance: 13,000; Referee: Aleksandar Stavrev (Belarus)

22 October 2009 3	Sheriff Tiraspol (Moldova)	2–0	(Netherlands) Twente	Tiraspol, Moldova
20:00 EEST (UTC+3)	Balima 41'; Jymmy (yellow card) 90+2' (goal) 90+4'; Yerokhin (yellow card) 90+3'	Report	Douglas (yellow card) 89'	Stadium: Sheriff Stadium; Attendance: 10,000; Referee: Tony Asumaa (Finland)

5 November 2009 4	Twente (Netherlands)	2–1	(Moldova) Sheriff Tiraspol	Enschede, Netherlands
22:05 EET (UTC+2)	Stoch 7', 89' (yellow card) 90'; Nkufo (yellow card) 86'	Report	Tioté 67' (o.g.); Kuchuk (yellow card) 80'	Stadium: De Grolsch Veste; Attendance: 19,000; Referee: Aleksei Kulbakov (Belarus)

2 December 2009 5	Sheriff Tiraspol (Moldova)	1–1	(Romania) Steaua București	Tiraspol, Moldova
20:00 EET (UTC+2)	Rouamba (yellow card) 79'; Rodríguez (yellow card) 80'; Diedhiou 83'	Report	Bicfalvi (yellow card) 27'; Toja 87'; Surdu (yellow card) 89'; Marin (red card) 90+3'	Stadium: Sheriff Stadium; Attendance: 12,500; Referee: Tommy Skjerven (Norway)

17 December 2009 6	Fenerbahçe (Turkey)	1–0	(Moldova) Sheriff Tiraspol	Istanbul, Turkey
22:05 EEST (UTC+3)	Boral 15'	Report	Jymmy (yellow card) 42'; Tarkhnishvili (yellow card) 72'; Rouamba (yellow card) 90+1'	Stadium: Şükrü Saracoğlu Stadium; Attendance: 15,000; Referee: Zsolt Szabó (Hungary)

== Squad statistics ==
As of Match played 30 May 2010

=== Appearances and goals ===
No.	Pos	Nat	Player	Total		Divizia Naţională		Moldovan Cup		Champions League		Europa League	
No.	Pos	Nat	Player	Apps	Goals	Apps	Goals	Apps	Goals	Apps	Goals	Apps	Goals
3	MF	(Serbia) SRB	Vladimir Volkov	38	9	18+10	9	0	0	0+4	0	3+3	0
5	DF	(Georgia (country)) GEO	Vazha Tarkhnishvili	41	0	29	0	0	0	6	0	6	0
6	DF	(Moldova) MDA	Alexandru Scripcenco	4	0	3+1	0	0	0	0	0	0	0
7	MF	(Montenegro) MNE	Baćo Nikolić	8	1	3+5	1	0	0	0	0	0	0
8	MF	(Moldova) MDA	Serghei Gheorghiev	14	1	11+3	1	0	0	0	0	0	0
9	FW	(Brazil) BRA	Jymmy	26	14	16+5	13	0	0	0+2	0	2+1	1
10	MF	(Russia) RUS	Aleksandr Yerokhin	35	11	22+6	11	0	0	2	0	5	0
11	MF	(Montenegro) MNE	Žarko Korać	7	0	2+5	0	0	0	0	0	0	0
12	GK	(Moldova) MDA	Dmitri Stajila	6	0	6	0	0	0	0	0	0	0
13	DF	(Moldova) MDA	Sergey Dulgher	5	0	3+2	0	0	0	0	0	0	0
14	MF	(Burkina Faso) BFA	Wilfried Balima	30	4	14+4	3	0	0	6	0	6	1
16	DF	(Moldova) MDA	Artiom Haceaturov	13	0	8+5	0	0	0	0	0	0	0
17	MF	(Burkina Faso) BFA	Florent Rouamba	33	2	15+6	2	0	0	6	0	6	0
18	DF	(Romania) ROU	Constantin Arbănaș	28	1	12+7	1	0	0	4	0	3+2	0
19	MF	(Montenegro) MNE	Marko Đurović	8	1	2+6	1	0	0	0	0	0	0
20	DF	(Ukraine) UKR	Rustam Tsynya	19	0	12+4	0	0	0	1	0	2	0
21	FW	(Senegal) SEN	Amath Diedhiou	37	7	17+9	6	0	0	6	0	1+4	1
22	MF	(Argentina) ARG	Luis Antonio Rodríguez	27	0	13+3	0	0	0	6	0	5	0
23	MF	(Moldova) MDA	Eduard Hoderean	8	1	1+7	1	0	0	0	0	0	0
25	GK	(Bulgaria) BUL	Vladislav Stoyanov	9	0	9	0	0	0	0	0	0	0
26	DF	(Slovenia) SLO	Miral Samardžić	7	0	5+2	0	0	0	0	0	0	0
27	MF	(Moldova) MDA	Vitalie Bulat	35	3	13+17	3	0	0	2+2	0	0+1	0
28	DF	(Brazil) BRA	Nadson	27	4	20+1	3	0	0	4	1	2	0
30	DF	(Serbia) SRB	Vladimir Branković	24	3	20+2	3	0	0	0+1	0	1	0
44	MF	(Serbia) SRB	Miloš Adamović	14	2	13+1	2	0	0	0	0	0	0
	GK	(Moldova) MDA	Alexandru Melenciuc	11	0	11	0	0	0	0	0	0	0
	DF	(Moldova) MDA	Vadim Costandachi	1	0	1	0	0	0	0	0	0	0
	FW	(Moldova) MDA	Constantin Mandrîcenco	3	1	1+1	1	0	0	0+1	0	0	0
Players away from Sheriff on loan:
15	DF	(Belarus) BLR	Ihar Karpovich	12	0	5+3	0	0	0	3	0	1	0
Players who left Sheriff during the season:
1	GK	(Moldova) MDA	Stanislav Namașco	19	0	7	0	0	0	6	0	6	0
2	DF	(Brazil) BRA	Serjão	17	1	9+3	1	0	0	1+1	0	3	0
4	MF	(Moldova) MDA	Andrei Verbetchi	16	0	8+5	0	0	0	0+2	0	1	0
7	MF	(Moldova) MDA	Andrei Corneencov	20	1	9+1	1	0	0	6	0	3+1	0
11	FW	(Moldova) MDA	Alexandru Suvorov	22	3	8+5	1	0	0	5+1	2	2+1	0
19	MF	(Moldova) MDA	Victor Truhanov	4	1	2+2	1	0	0	0	0	0	0
24	DF	(Togo) TOG	Abdoul-Gafar Mamah	14	0	7+1	0	0	0	2	0	4	0
88	MF	(Belarus) BLR	Aliaksei Kuchuk	20	7	7+7	7	0	0	0+1	0	4+1	0

=== Goal scorers ===
Place	Position	Nation	Number	Name	National Division	Moldovan Cup	UEFA Champions League	UEFA Europa League	Total
1	FW	(Brazil)	9	Jymmy	13	4	0	1	18
2	MF	(Russia)	10	Aleksandr Yerokhin	11	0	0	0	11
3	MF	(Serbia)	3	Vladimir Volkov	9	0	0	0	9
4	FW	(Belarus)	88	Aliaksei Kuchuk	7	0	0	0	7
4	FW	(Senegal)	21	Amath Diedhiou	6	0	0	1	7
6	MF	(Burkina Faso)	14	Wilfried Balima	3	1	0	1	5
7	DF	(Brazil)	28	Nadson	3	0	1	0	4
7	FW	(Moldova)	11	Alexandru Suvorov	1	1	2	0	4
9	MF	(Moldova)	27	Vitalie Bulat	3	0	0	0	3
9	DF	(Serbia)	30	Vladimir Branković	3	0	0	0	3
9	MF	(Burkina Faso)	17	Florent Rouamba	2	1	0	0	3
9				Own goal	2	0	0	1	3
9	MF	(Moldova)	7	Andrei Corneencov	1	2	0	0	3
14	MF	(Moldova)	8	Serghei Gheorghiev	2	0	0	0	2
14	MF	(Serbia)	44	Miloš Adamović	2	0	0	0	2
16	FW	(Moldova)	8	Constantin Mandricenco	1	0	0	0	1
16	MF	(Moldova)	19	Victor Truhanov	1	0	0	0	1
16	DF	(Brazil)	2	Serjão	1	0	0	0	1
16	DF	(Romania)	18	Constantin Arbănaș	1	0	0	0	1
16	MF	(Montenegro)	19	Marko Đurović	1	0	0	0	1
16	FW	(Montenegro)	7	Baćo Nikolić	1	0	0	0	1
16	MF	(Moldova)	23	Eduard Hoderean	1	0	0	0	1
				TOTALS	75	8	3	4	90

=== Disciplinary record ===
Number	Nation	Position	Name	National Division		Moldovan Cup		UEFA Champions League		UEFA Europa League		Total	
Number	Nation	Position	Name	Yellow card	Red card	Yellow card	Red card	Yellow card	Red card	Yellow card	Red card	Yellow card	Red card
3	(Serbia)	DF	Vladimir Volkov	6	0	0	0	0	0	0	0	6	0
5	(Georgia (country))	DF	Vazha Tarkhnishvili	3	0	0	0	1	0	1	0	5	0
7	(Montenegro)	MF	Baćo Nikolić	3	0	0	0	0	0	0	0	3	0
9	(Brazil)	FW	Jymmy	1	0	0	0	1	0	2	0	4	0
10	(Russia)	MF	Aleksandr Yerokhin	4	1	0	0	0	0	2	0	6	1
14	(Burkina Faso)	MF	Wilfried Balima	1	0	0	0	1	0	0	0	2	0
16	(Moldova)	MF	Artiom Haceaturov	2	0	0	0	0	0	0	0	2	0
17	(Burkina Faso)	MF	Florent Rouamba	4	0	0	0	0	0	2	0	6	0
18	(Romania)	DF	Constantin Arbănaș	7	1	0	0	0	0	0	0	7	1
19	(Montenegro)	MF	Marko Đurović	2	0	0	0	0	0	0	0	2	0
20	(Ukraine)	DF	Rustam Tsynya	5	0	0	0	0	0	1	0	6	0
21	(Senegal)	FW	Amath Diedhiou	1	0	0	0	0	0	1	0	2	0
22	(Argentina)	MF	Luis Antonio Rodríguez	3	0	0	0	1	0	2	0	6	0
23	(Moldova)	MF	Eduard Hoderean	2	0	0	0	0	0	0	0	2	0
27	(Moldova)	MF	Vitalie Bulat	2	0	0	0	1	0	0	0	3	0
28	(Brazil)	DF	Nadson	2	0	0	0	0	0	0	0	2	0
30	(Serbia)	DF	Vladimir Branković	6	0	0	0	0	0	0	0	6	0
44	(Serbia)	MF	Miloš Adamović	2	0	0	0	0	0	0	0	2	0
Players away from Sheriff Tiraspol on loan:
15	(Belarus)	DF	Ihar Karpovich	0	0	0	0	1	0	1	0	2	0
Players who left Sheriff Tiraspol during the season:
4	(Moldova)	MF	Andrei Verbetchi	1	0	0	0	0	0	0	0	1	0
7	(Moldova)	MF	Andrei Corneencov	1	0	0	0	0	0	0	0	1	0
11	(Moldova)	FW	Alexandru Suvorov	2	0	0	0	1	0	0	0	3	0
24	(Togo)	DF	Abdoul-Gafar Mamah	2	0	0	0	1	0	0	0	3	0
88	(Belarus)	MF	Aliaksei Kuchuk	4	0	0	0	1	0	2	0	7	0
			TOTALS	66	2	0	0	9	0	14	0	89	2

== Notes ==
Notes

- Note 1: The second of two home matches which Steaua București had to play behind closed doors because their fans had flown offensive banners to Újpest in the second qualifying round.
