= 2007 Moldovan Super Cup =

Supercupa Moldovei
Sheriff Tiraspol	Zimbru Chișinău
1	0
- Date: 27 June 2007
- Venue: Sheriff Stadium, Tiraspol
- Referee: Veaceslav Banari
- Attendance: 12,500

The 2007 Moldovan Super Cup was the fourth Moldovan Super Cup (Romanian: Supercupa Moldovei), an annual Moldovan football match played by the winner of the national football league (the National Division) and the winner of the national Cup. The match was played between Sheriff Tiraspol, champions of the 2006–07 National Division, and Zimbru Chișinău, winners of the 2006–07 Moldovan Cup. It was held at the Sheriff Stadium on 27 June 2007.

Sheriff Tiraspol won the match 1–0.

== Match ==
27 June 2007
20:00 EEST

Sheriff Tiraspol	1–0	Zimbru Chișinău
Thiago 84'

Sheriff Stadium, Tiraspol
Attendance: 12,500
Referee: Veaceslav Banari

Sheriff	Zimbru

GK	12	(Moldova) Alexandru Melenciuc
DF	4	(Brazil) Wallace	(yellow card) 90'
DF	5	(Georgia (country)) Vazha Tarkhnishvili
DF	13	(Burkina Faso) Ben Idrissa Dermé
DF	24	(Burkina Faso) Ibrahim Gnanou
DF	28	(Brazil) Nadson		(substituted off) 74'
MF	7	(Moldova) Andrei Corneencov
MF	14	(Burkina Faso) Wilfried Balima		(substituted off) 84'
MF	18	(Romania) Constantin Arbănaș		(substituted off) 90+2'
FW	9	(Belarus) Aliaksei Kuchuk		(substituted off) 71'
FW	27	(Brazil) Thiago Constância	(yellow card) 59'
Substitutes:
DF	3	(Argentina) Nicolás Demaldé		(substituted in) 90+2'
MF	6	(Burkina Faso) Florent Rouamba		(substituted in) 74'
MF	11	(Moldova) Alexandru Suvorov		(substituted in) 84'
FW	10	(Moldova) Serghei Alexeev		(substituted in) 71'
Manager:
(Belarus) Leonid Kuchuk

GK	1	(Moldova) Nicolae Calancea	(yellow card) 53' (yellow-red card) 90+4'
DF	2	(Romania) Lucian Dobre
DF	3	(Georgia (country)) Mamuka Lomidze
DF	18	(Romania) Daniel Bălașa	(yellow card) 45+1' (yellow-red card) 78'
DF	28	(Moldova) Alexei Savinov
MF	5	(Romania) Valentin Stan
MF	17	(Moldova) Andrei Cojocari
MF	19	(Moldova) Artiom Carp		(substituted off) 55'
MF	27	(Ukraine) Kyrylo Kovalchuk	(yellow card) 46'
MF	33	(Moldova) Artur Ioniță		(substituted off) 73'
FW	25	(Moldova) Iurie Livandovschi		(substituted off) 85'
Substitutions:
MF	20	(Romania) Filip Popescu	(yellow card) 82'	(substituted in) 55'
MF	24	(Moldova) Ion Demerji		(substituted in) 73'
FW	15	(Russia) Aleksandr Nikulin		(substituted in) 85'
Manager:
(Ukraine) Oleksandr Sevidov

Assistant referees:
Anatol Bodean
Andrei Bodean
Fourth official:
Igor Șațchi

Match rules

- 90 minutes.
- Penalty shoot-out if score is still level.
