= Wilfried Balima =

Burkinabé international footballer

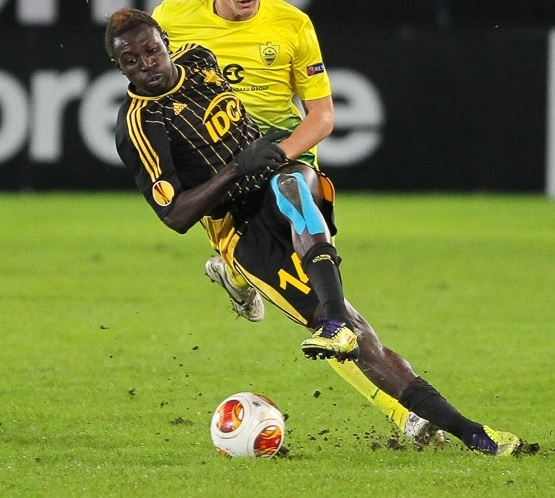

Personal information
- Full name: Wilfried Benjamin Balima
- Date of birth: 20 March 1985 (age 41)
- Place of birth: Bobo-Dioulasso, Burkina Faso
- Height: 1.88 m (6 ft 2 in)
- Positions: Wingback; defender

Senior career*
Years	Team	Apps	(Gls)
2001–2004	US Ouagadougou	65	(13)
2005–2020	Sheriff Tiraspol	309	(57)

International career^{‡}
2006–2008	Burkina Faso U-20	18	(3)
2004–2015	Burkina Faso	25	(2)
Medal record
Representing Burkina Faso
Africa Cup of Nations
Runner-up	2013 South Africa
- * Club domestic league appearances and goals as of 25 January 2020 ‡ National team caps and goals as of 17 July 2015

Wilfried Benjamin Balima (born 20 March 1985) commonly known as Benjamin Balima, is a retired Burkinabé international footballer who spent the majority of career with Moldovan National Division club Sheriff Tiraspol as a right defender.

== Career ==
=== Club ===
In June 2017, Balima left Sheriff Tiraspol after twelve years with the club. Balima re-signed for Sheriff Tiraspol on 20 July 2017.

On 24 January 2020, Balima announced that he had retired from football, and that he had joined the coaching staff of Sheriff Tiraspol.

=== International ===
Balima played for the Burkina Faso under-21 team and the senior national team from Burkina Faso.

== Career statistics ==
=== Club ===
As of match played 20 November 2018

Club	Season	League			National Cup		Continental		Other		Total	
Club	Season	Division	Apps	Goals	Apps	Goals	Apps	Goals	Apps	Goals	Apps	Goals
US Ouagadougou	2002	Burkinabé Premier League	7	2			-		-		7	2
US Ouagadougou	2002–03	Burkinabé Premier League	16	2			-		-		16	2
US Ouagadougou	2003–04	Burkinabé Premier League	20	4			-		-		20	4
US Ouagadougou	2004–05	Burkinabé Premier League	22	5			-		-		22	5
US Ouagadougou	Total		65	13	0	0	0	0	0	0	65	13
Sheriff Tiraspol	2005–06	Divizia Naţională	14	5			0	0	-		14	5
Sheriff Tiraspol	2006–07	Divizia Naţională	24	3			1	0	-		25	3
Sheriff Tiraspol	2007–08	Divizia Naţională	27	4			4	1	1	0	32	5
Sheriff Tiraspol	2008–09	Divizia Naţională	23	1			4	0	-		27	1
Sheriff Tiraspol	2009–10	Divizia Naţională	18	3			12	1	-		30	4
Sheriff Tiraspol	2010–11	Divizia Naţională	31	6			8	0	-		39	6
Sheriff Tiraspol	2011–12	Divizia Naţională	24	18			2	0	-		26	18
Sheriff Tiraspol	2012–13	Divizia Naţională	27	5	2	1	5	0	0	0	34	6
Sheriff Tiraspol	2013–14	Divizia Naţională	21	1	3	0	9	0	1	1	34	2
Sheriff Tiraspol	2014–15	Divizia Naţională	18	2	0	0	4	0	-		22	2
Sheriff Tiraspol	2015–16	Divizia Naţională	22	3	1	0	1	0	0	0	24	3
Sheriff Tiraspol	2016–17	Divizia Naţională	23	1	1	0	0	0	1	0	25	1
Sheriff Tiraspol	2017	Divizia Naţională	9	2	0	0	7	0	0	0	16	2
Sheriff Tiraspol	2018	Divizia Naţională	15	0	4	3	4	0	0	0	23	0
Sheriff Tiraspol	2019	Divizia Naţională	13	3	3	0	5	0	1	0	22	3
Sheriff Tiraspol	Total		309	57	14	4	66	2	4	1	393	64
Career total			374	70	14	4	66	2	4	1	458	77

=== International ===
Burkina Faso
Year	Apps	Goals
2004	1	0
2005	1	0
2010	3	2
2011	4	0
2012	6	0
2013	5	0
2014	4	0
2015	1	0
Total	25	2

Statistics accurate as of match played 13 January 2015

=== International goals ===
#	Date	Venue	Opponent	Score	Result	Competition
1.	9 October 2010	Addis Ababa Stadium, Ouagadougou, Burkina Faso	Gambia	3–1	Win	2012 ANC qualification
2.	17 November 2010	Stade Aimé Bergeal, Mantes-la-Ville, France	Guinea	2–1	Win	Friendly
Correct as of 19 November 2010

== Honours ==
US Ouagadougou

- Burkinabé Cup: 2004–05
- Burkinabé SuperCup: 2004–05

Sheriff Tiraspol

- Moldovan National Division: 2005–06, 2006–07, 2007–08, 2008–09, 2009–10, 2011–12, 2012–13, 2013–14, 2015–16, 2016–17, 2017, 2018, 2019
- Moldovan Cup: 2005–06, 2007–08, 2008–09, 2009–10, 2014–15, 2016–17, 2018–19
- Moldovan Super Cup: 2007, 2013, 2015, 2016
- CIS Cup: 2009
