= Abdoul-Gafar Mamah =

Togolese footballer

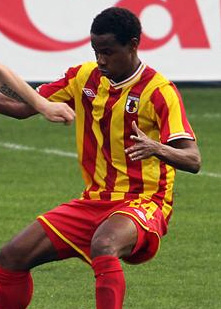

Personal information
- Date of birth: 24 August 1985 (age 41)
- Place of birth: Kpalimé, Togo
- Height: 1.72 m (5 ft 8 in)
- Position: Full-back

Senior career*
Years	Team	Apps	(Gls)
2000–2002	Gomido		
2003–2005	105 Libreville		
2005–2010	Sheriff Tiraspol	88	(1)
2010–2011	Alania Vladikavkaz	13	(0)
2011–2017	Dacia Chişinău	176	(1)
2018–2021	Ventspils	65	(0)
2021–2022	Ouest Tourangeau	2	(0)

International career
1999–2004	Togo U21	39	(0)
2000–2016	Togo	93	(0)
- * Club domestic league appearances and goals as of 5 August 2023

Abdoul-Gafar Mamah (born 24 August 1985) is a Togolese former professional footballer who played as a full-back.

== International career ==
Born in Kpalimé, Mamah represented the Togo national team by the 2002 African Cup of Nations in Mali and 2006 Africa Cup of Nations in Egypt.

== Career statistics ==
=== Club ===
Appearances and goals by club, season and competition
Club	Season	League			National cup		Continental		Other		Total	
Club	Season	Division	Apps	Goals	Apps	Goals	Apps	Goals	Apps	Goals	Apps	Goals
Sheriff Tiraspol	2005–06	Moldovan National Division	7	0			–		–		7	0
Sheriff Tiraspol	2006–07	Moldovan National Division	25	0			4	0	–		29	0
Sheriff Tiraspol	2007–08	Moldovan National Division	25	1			2	0			27	1
Sheriff Tiraspol	2008–09	Moldovan National Division	23	0			2	0	–		25	0
Sheriff Tiraspol	2009–10	Moldovan National Division	8	0			6	0	–		14	0
Sheriff Tiraspol	Total		88	1	0	0	14	0	0	0	102	1
Alania Vladikavkaz	2010	Russian Premier League	13	0	2	0	–		–		15	0
Dacia Chișinău	2010–11	Moldovan National Division	9	0			–		–		9	0
Dacia Chișinău	2011–12	Moldovan National Division	27	0			2	0	–		29	0
Dacia Chișinău	2012–13	Moldovan National Division	25	0	1	0	4	0	–		30	0
Dacia Chișinău	2013–14	Moldovan National Division	20	0	2	0	–		–		22	0
Dacia Chișinău	2014–15	Moldovan National Division	23	0	3	0	–		–		26	0
Dacia Chișinău	2015–16	Moldovan National Division	26	0	2	0	4	0	–		32	0
Dacia Chișinău	2016–17	Moldovan National Division	28	0	1	0	2	0	–		31	0
Dacia Chișinău	2017	Moldovan National Division	18	1	0	0	2	0	–		20	1
Dacia Chișinău	Total		176	1	9	0	14	0	0	0	199	1
Ventspils	2018	Virslīga	18	0	2	0	4	0	–		24	0
Ventspils	2019	Virslīga	21	0	0	0	6	0	–		27	0
Ventspils	2020	Virslīga	21	0	2	0	1	0	–		24	0
Ventspils	2021	Virslīga	5	0	0	0	–		–		5	0
Ventspils	Total		65	0	4	0	11	0	0	0	80	0
Ouest Tourangeau	2021–22	Championnat National 3	2	0	0	0	–		–		2	0
Career total			344	2	15	0	39	0	0	0	398	2

=== International ===
Appearances and goals by national team and year
National team	Year	Apps	Goals
Togo	2000	1	0
Togo	2001	9	0
Togo	2002	4	0
Togo	2003	5	0
Togo	2004	5	0
Togo	2005	2	0
Togo	2006	5	0
Togo	2007	4	0
Togo	2008	7	0
Togo	2009	4	0
Togo	2010	5	0
Togo	2011	5	0
Togo	2012	8	0
Togo	2013	8	0
Togo	2014	3	0
Togo	2015	5	0
Togo	2016	7	0
Total		88	0

== Honours ==
Sheriff Tiraspol

- Moldovan National Division: 2005–06, 2006–07, 2007–08, 2008–09, 2009–10
- Moldovan Cup: 2005–06, 2007–08, 2008–09, 2009–10
- Moldovan Super Cup: 2007

Dacia Chișinău

- Moldovan National Division: 2010–11
- Moldovan Super Cup: 2011
