= Amath Diedhiou =

Senegalese footballer (born 1989)

Personal information
- Full name: Amath André Dansokho Diedhiou
- Date of birth: November 19, 1989 (age 36)
- Place of birth: Dakar, Senegal
- Height: 1.70 m (5 ft 7 in)
- Position: Striker

Senior career*
Years	Team	Apps	(Gls)
2009–2011	Sheriff Tiraspol	64	(21)
2011–2012	JA Drancy	25	(2)
2012–2013	US Quevilly	19	(0)
2015	FH	0	(0)
2015	→ Leiknir R. (loan)	6	(0)
2015	→ BÍ/Bolungarvík (loan)	7	(1)
2018–2019	Bayeux	8	(0)
2019	Entente SSG	11	(1)
2020	Versailles 78	2	(0)
2020–2021	Engordany	18	(4)

International career
200?–200?	Senegal U16	0	(0)
200?–200?	Senegal U18	4	(0)
200?–	Senegal U20	3	(1)
- * Club domestic league appearances and goals as of 1 October 2021

Amath André Diedhiou (born 19 November 1989, Dakar) is a Senegalese footballer who last played for UE Engordany.

== Career ==
Diedhiou joined Sheriff Tiraspol in January 2009.

== Career statistics ==
As of match played 28 June 2015

Club	Season	League			National Cup		League Cup		Continental		Total	
Club	Season	Division	Apps	Goals	Apps	Goals	Apps	Goals	Apps	Goals	Apps	Goals
Sheriff Tiraspol	2008–09	Divizia Naţională	3	2			-		0	0	3	2
Sheriff Tiraspol	2009–10	Divizia Naţională	27	6			-		11	1	38	6
Sheriff Tiraspol	2010–11	Divizia Naţională	34	13	4	1	-		11	0	49	14
Sheriff Tiraspol	Total		64	21	4	1	0	0	22	1	91	23
JA Drancy	2011–12	CFA	25	2	1	1	-		-		26	3
US Quevilly	2012–13	Championnat National	19	0	0	0	-		-		19	0
FH	2015	Úrvalsdeild	0	0	0	0	0	0	-		0	0
Leiknir R. (loan)	2015	Úrvalsdeild	6	0	1	0	0	0	-		7	0
Career total			114	23	6	2	0	0	22	1	142	26

== Honours ==
Sheriff Tiraspol

- Moldovan National Division (2): 2008–09, 2009–10
- Moldovan Cup (2): 2008–09, 2009–10
