= Leonid Kuchuk =

Belarusian footballer and manager

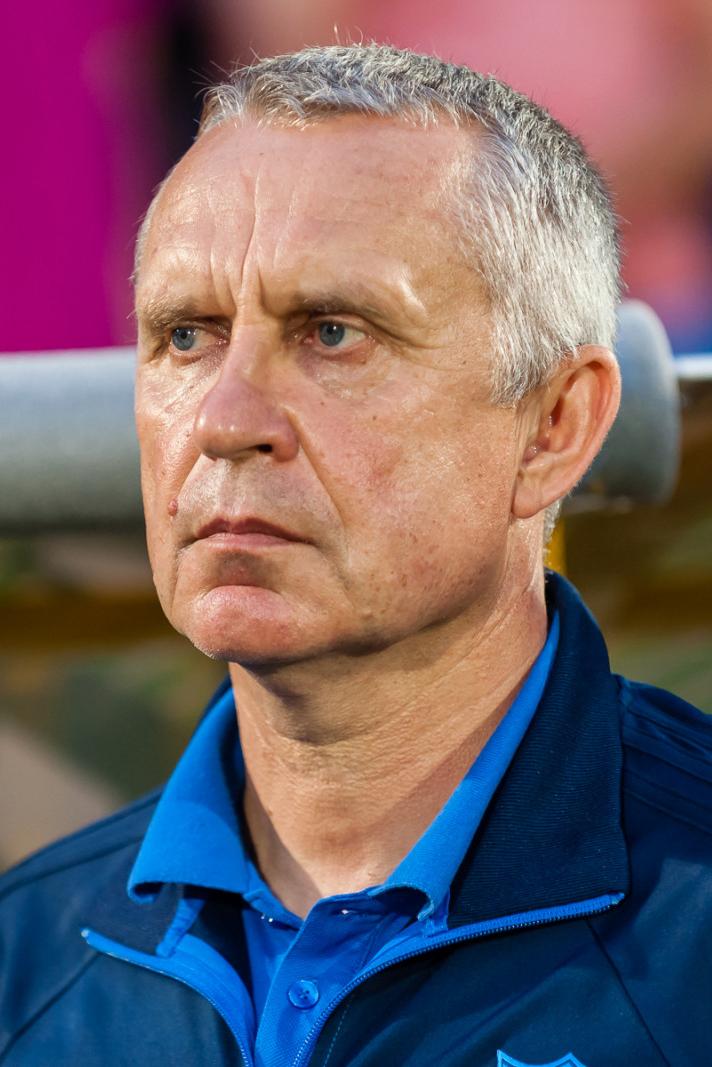
- Kuchuk coaching Rostov in 2017

Personal information
- Full name: Leonid Stanislavovich Kuchuk
- Date of birth: 27 August 1959 (age 67)
- Place of birth: Minsk, Soviet Union
- Height: 1.76 m (5 ft 9 in)
- Position: Defender

Youth career
- Torpedo Minsk

Senior career*
Years	Team	Apps	(Gls)
1978–1979	Dinamo Minsk	0	(0)
1980–1988	Gomselmash Gomel	249	(6)
1989–1991	KIM Vitebsk	101	(1)
1992–1994	Molodechno	61	(2)
1995–1997	Ataka Minsk	51	(0)
1998	Dinamo-93 Minsk	3	(0)
Total		465	(8)

Managerial career
- 1990: KIM Vitebsk (assistant)
- 1995: Ataka-Aura Minsk (director)
- 1998: Dinamo-93 Minsk
- 1998: Molodechno
- 2003: Lokomotiv Minsk (assistant)
- 2004–2010: Sheriff Tiraspol
- 2010: Salyut Belgorod
- 2010–2011: Sheriff Tiraspol (sporting director)
- 2011–2012: Arsenal Kyiv
- 2013: Kuban Krasnodar
- 2013–2014: Lokomotiv Moscow
- 2014–2015: Kuban Krasnodar
- 2017: Stal Kamianske
- 2017: Rostov
- 2019: Rukh Vynnyky
- 2020–2021: Dinamo Minsk
- 2021–2023: Rukh Lviv
- * Club domestic league appearances and goals

Leonid Stanislavovich Kuchuk (Belarusian: Леанід Станіслававіч Кучук, romanized: Leanid Stanisłavavič Kučuk; born 27 August 1959) is a Belarusian football manager and former professional player.

== Managerial career ==
On 15 September 2014, Kuchuk was suspended as head coach of Lokomotiv Moscow, whilst the board agreed the termination of his contract.

On 18 September 2014, Kuchuk was sacked as manager of Lokomotiv Moscow after the side made a disappointing start to the season.

In 2017, he was a manager of the Ukrainian Premier League club Stal Kamianske.

On 9 June 2017, he was hired as the manager of the Russian Premier League side FC Rostov. He resigned from Rostov on 6 December 2017.

On 1 February 2019, Kuchuk was announced as the next manager of the Ukrainian First League club Rukh Vynnyky.

== Personal ==
His son Aliaksei Kuchuk was a professional football player and now a football manager.

== Honours ==
=== Manager ===
Sheriff Tiraspol

- Divizia Naţională (6): 2003–04, 2004–05, 2005–06, 2006–07, 2007–08, 2008–09
- Moldovan Cup (3): 2005–06, 2007–08, 2008–09
- Moldovan Cup runner-up (1): 2003–04
- Moldovan Super Cup (3): 2004, 2005, 2007
- CIS Cup (1): 2009

Lokomotiv

- Russian Premier League 3rd : 2013–14

=== Individual ===
- Manager of the Year in Moldova: 2009
- Manager of the Year in Ukraine: 2011–12
- Manager of the Year in Belarus: 2013
- Manager of the Month in Russian Football Premier League (2): August, November 2013
