= Vitalie Bulat =

Moldovan footballer

Personal information
- Date of birth: 14 September 1987 (age 39)
- Place of birth: Tiraspol, Soviet Union
- Height: 1.84 m (6 ft 1/2 in)
- Position: Midfielder

Senior career*
Years	Team	Apps	(Gls)
2003–2011	Sherff Tiraspol	52	(6)
2003–2005	→ Sheriff-2 Tiraspol	31	(6)
2008	→ Tiraspol (loan)	16	(2)
2010	→ Iskra-Stal (loan)	13	(2)
2011	→ Tiraspol (loan)	15	(0)
2012–2013	Tiraspol	25	(1)
2013	Novi Pazar	1	(0)
2014	OFK Beograd	0	(0)
2014	→ Sunkar (loan)	6	(0)

International career^{‡}
	Moldova U17	6	(0)
	Moldova U19	4	(0)
	Moldova U21	2	(0)
- * Club domestic league appearances and goals as of 13 January 2015 ‡ National team caps and goals as of 2 December 2013

Vitalie Bulat (born 14 September 1987) is a Moldovan footballer.

== Career ==
Born in Tiraspol, in the Moldovan SSR, Soviet Union, Vitalie Bulat started his senior career in the season 2003–04 by playing with FC Sheriff-2 Tiraspol in the Moldovan Second League. He was FC Sheriff Tiraspol player from the start until the winter break of the 2011–12 season. During his period there he had a number of loans, namely to other Moldovan top league sides FC Tiraspol and FC Iskra-Stal. He played with Sheriff in the Moldovan National Division in the seasons 2004–05, 2005–06, 2008–09, 2009–10 and 2010–11.

During the winter break of the 2011–12 season he signed with FC Tiraspol where he would play the second half of the 2011–12 season, and the 2012–13.

In summer 2013 he moved abroad to Serbia and joined FK Novi Pazar. He made his debut in the 2013–14 Serbian SuperLiga as a substitute in an away match against FK Radnički 1923 on 30 November 2013.

In 2014, he played on loan at FC Sunkar at 2014 Kazakhstan First Division.

== National team ==
Vitalie Bulat was part of Moldovan U17, U19 and U21 national teams.

== Honours ==
Sheriff

- Moldovan National Division: 2004–05, 2005–06, 2008–09, 2009–10
- Moldovan Cup: 2006, 2009, 2010
- Moldovan Super Cup: 2005
- CIS Cup: 2009

Tiraspol

- Moldovan Cup: 2013

Iskra-Stal

- Moldovan Cup: 2011
