= Constantin Arbănaș =

Romanian footballer (born 1983)

Dorian Arbănaş
Personal information
- Full name: Constantin Dorian Arbănaş
- Date of birth: 28 July 1983 (age 43)
- Place of birth: Reșița, Romania
- Height: 1.82 m (5 ft 11 1/2 in)
- Position: Defender

Youth career
- –2002: Gloria Reșița

Senior career*
Years	Team	Apps	(Gls)
2002–2006	Gloria Bistriţa	47	(1)
2006–2010	Sheriff Tiraspol	94	(7)
2010	Khazar Lankaran	12	(1)
2011	Sfîntul Gheorghe	32	(5)
2012	Milsami Orhei	0	(0)
2012	Olimpia Bălți	16	(0)
2013	Rapid Ghidighici	4	(0)
Total		205	(14)

International career
2003	Romania U21	1	(0)

Managerial career
- 2022: Progresul Ezeriș
- * Club domestic league appearances and goals

Constantin Dorian Arbănaş (born 28 July 1983) is a former Romanian professional footballer who played as a defender.

== Honours ==
Sheriff Tiraspol

- Divizia Naţională: 2006–07, 2007–08, 2008–09, 2009–10
- Cupa Moldovei: 2007–08, 2008–09, 2009–10
- Supercupa Moldovei: 2007
- CIS Cup: 2009

Milsami Orhei

- Cupa Moldovei: 2011–12
