= Alexandru Suvorov =

Moldovan footballer

Personal information
- Full name: Alexandru Suvorov
- Date of birth: 2 February 1987 (age 39)
- Place of birth: Chișinău, Moldavian SSR, Soviet Union
- Height: 1.74 m (5 ft 9 in)
- Position: Midfielder

Senior career*
Years	Team	Apps	(Gls)
2002–2010	Sheriff Tiraspol	96	(8)
2007–2009	→ Tiraspol (loan)	21	(9)
2010–2012	Cracovia	57	(9)
2013	Academia Chișinău	9	(4)
2013–2014	Mordovia Saransk	3	(0)
2015–2016	Milsami Orhei	12	(1)
2016	Academia Chișinău	8	(1)
2016–2017	Zaria Bălți	21	(2)
2017–2023	Sfântul Gheorghe	123	(23)
2023–2024	Florești	20	(1)

International career
	Moldova U17	8	(2)
	Moldova U19	9	(0)
	Moldova U21	8	(1)
2006–2020	Moldova	59	(5)
- * Club domestic league appearances and goals as of 2 October 2026

Alexandru Suvorov (born 2 February 1987) is a Moldovan former professional footballer who played as an midfielder.

== International goals ==
Scores and results list Moldova's goal tally first.

No.	Date	Venue	Opponent	Score	Result	Competition
1	3 September 2010	Zimbru Stadium, Chișinău, Moldova	Finland	1–0	2–0	UEFA Euro 2012 qualifier
2	7 September 2010	Szusza Ferenc Stadium, Budapest, Hungary	Hungary	1–2	1–2	UEFA Euro 2012 qualifier
3	29 March 2011	Råsunda Stadium, Solna, Sweden	Sweden	1–2	1–2	UEFA Euro 2012 qualifier
4	11 October 2011	Zimbru Stadium, Chișinău, Moldova	San Marino	3–0	4–0	UEFA Euro 2012 qualifier
5	26 March 2013	Chornomorets Stadium, Odesa, Ukraine	Ukraine	1–2	1–2	2014 FIFA World Cup qualifier

== Honours ==
Sheriff Tiraspol

- Moldovan National Division: 2002–03, 2003–04, 2004–05, 2005–06, 2006–07, 2008–09
- Moldovan Cup: 2005–06, 2008–09
- Moldovan Super Cup: 2005
- Commonwealth of Independent States Cup: 2003, 2009

Mordovia Saransk

- Russian Football National League: 2013–14

Milsami Orhei

- Moldovan National Division: 2014–15

Sfântul Gheorghe

- Moldovan Cup: 2020–21
- Moldovan Super Cup: 2021
