= Vladimir Volkov (footballer) =

Footballer (born 1986)

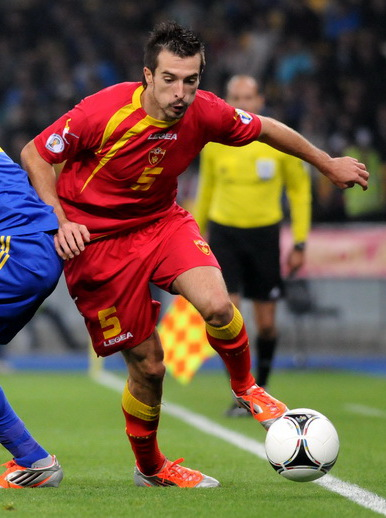
- Volkov playing for Montenegro in 2012

Personal information
- Date of birth: 6 June 1986 (age 40)
- Place of birth: Belgrade, SR Serbia, SFR Yugoslavia
- Height: 1.85 m (6 ft 1 in)
- Positions: Left back; left winger

Team information
- Current team: Rad
- Number: 25

Youth career
- 1993–2004: Radnički Beograd

Senior career*
Years	Team	Apps	(Gls)
2004–2005	Grafičar Beograd	25	(0)
2005–2006	Železničar Beograd	16	(0)
2006–2008	BSK Borča	47	(10)
2008	→ Portimonense (loan)	3	(0)
2008–2009	OFK Beograd	5	(0)
2009–2011	Sheriff Tiraspol	45	(13)
2011–2015	Partizan	76	(8)
2015–2016	Mechelen	13	(0)
2016	→ Lech Poznań (loan)	7	(0)
2017	Radnički Niš	6	(0)
2017–2018	Rad	26	(5)
2018	Ermis Aradippou	3	(0)
2019	Rad	7	(2)
2019–2020	Borac Banja Luka	7	(0)
2025–	Rad	12	(2)

International career
2011	Serbia	1	(0)
2012–2015	Montenegro	17	(0)
- * Club domestic league appearances and goals as of 15 July 2025

Vladimir Volkov (Serbian Cyrillic: Владимир Волков; born 6 June 1986) is a footballer who plays as a left-back for Rad.

Volkov is a dual citizen of Serbia and Montenegro. He made one international cap for Serbia in 2011, before switching his allegiance to Montenegro in 2012.

== Club career ==
=== Early career ===
Born in Serbian capital Belgrade, back then still the Yugoslav capital, Volkov started playing football in youth categories of FK Radnički Beograd when he was seven years old. Later, already as a senior, he played for FK BSK Borča from 2006 to early 2008, when he was moved to Portimonense. After that, Volkov spent the first part of the 2008–09 season with OFK Beograd before moving to Moldovan champions FC Sheriff Tiraspol in 2009.

=== Partizan ===
Volkov was transferred to FK Partizan before the end of the 2010–11 season, signing a three-year contract on 14 May 2011. He quickly established himself as first choice of coaches Aleksandar Stanojević and Avram Grant mostly because of his good games in qualification stages of 2011–12 UEFA Champions League.

=== Mechelen ===
In summer 2015, Volkov signed a two-year deal with Belgian side Mechelen. He was officially presented the following day and was given the number 3 shirt.

=== Lech Poznań ===
On 30 January 2016, he was loaned to Lech Poznań on a half-year deal.

=== Radnički Niš ===
On 13 January 2017, Volkov signed with Radnički Niš. The official presentation was on 17 January at club media-center, where Volkov, Anid Travančić and Ryota Noma were presented as the first signings of the winter-break and crucial reinforcements of Radnički for the second half of the 2016–17 Serbian SuperLiga.

=== Rad ===
In January 2019, Volkov joined FK Rad.

== International career ==
On 4 November 2011, the caretaker of the Serbia national team Radovan Ćurčić called-up Volkov for two friendly matches against Mexico and Honduras. He debuted on 15 November, playing the full match against Honduras.

Under new FIFA rules, a player who has dual citizenship and has played only one match for one of the two countries can change affiliation to play for the other national team. The Serbia "showed no interest", Volkov accepted Brnović's call up to the Montenegro national team. On 25 May 2012, Volkov made a debut for the Montenegro national team as a starter in a friendly match against Belgium. He earned a total of 17 caps, scoring no goals. His final international was a September 2015 European Championship qualification match against Liechtenstein.

== Personal life ==
Born in Belgrade, Volkov was raised in the city's urban municipality of New Belgrade. Growing up, his neighbourhood friends included Pavle Ninkov and Ivan Čvorović, both of whom would also go on to become professional footballers. As a curiosity, each one of the three ended up representing different national teams.

Volkov's paternal great-grandparents migrated from Russia to Serbia in 1917. Besides his native Serbian, he also speaks English, Portuguese, and Russian.

Throughout the latter part of the 2000s, Volkov was in a relationship with Serbian fitness instructor and media personality Ana Marija Žujović.

In 2017, he began dating Serbian singer Sandra Afrika. The two dated on-and-off over the following five years—including a period during which Volkov maintained a parallel relationship, with singer Ivana Boom Nikolić from the Serbian girl band Hurricane, an infidelity that Afrika reportedly discovered and eventually broke up with Volkov for good.

== Career statistics ==
=== Club ===
Appearances and goals by club, season and competition
Club	Season	League			National cup (Note: Includes Serbian Cup, Belgian Cup, Polish Cup)		Continental		Total	
Club	Season	Division	Apps	Goals	Apps	Goals	Apps	Goals	Apps	Goals
Grafičar Beograd	2004–05	Serbian League Belgrade	25	0	—		—		25	0
Železničar Beograd	2005–06	Serbian League Belgrade	16	0	—		—		16	0
BSK Borča	2006–07	Serbian First League	30	8	0	0	—		30	8
BSK Borča	2007–08	Serbian First League	17	2	0	0	—		17	2
BSK Borča	Total		47	10	0	0	0	0	47	10
Portimonense (loan)	2008–09	Liga de Honra	3	0	0	0	—		3	0
OFK Beograd	2008–09	Serbian SuperLiga	5	0	0	0	—		5	0
Sheriff Tiraspol	2008–09	Moldovan National Division	1	1	0	0	0	0	1	1
Sheriff Tiraspol	2009–10	Moldovan National Division	28	8	6	0	10 (Note: Four appearances in UEFA Champions League, six appearances in UEFA Europa League)	0	44	8
Sheriff Tiraspol	2010–11	Moldovan National Division	16	4	1	0	11 (Note: Six appearances and two goals in UEFA Champions League, five appearances in UEFA Europa League)	2	28	6
Sheriff Tiraspol	Total		45	13	7	0	21	2	73	15
Partizan	2011–12	Serbian SuperLiga	21	1	2	0	5 (Note: Four appearances in UEFA Champions League, one appearance and one goal in UEFA Europa League)	1	28	2
Partizan	2012–13	Serbian SuperLiga	12	1	2	0	10 (Note: Four appearances in UEFA Champions League, six appearances in UEFA Europa League)	0	24	1
Partizan	2013–14	Serbian SuperLiga	25	2	1	0	3 (Note: Two appearances and one goal in UEFA Champions League, one appearance in UEFA Europa League)	1	29	3
Partizan	2014–15	Serbian SuperLiga	18	4	4	0	9 (Note: Three appearances in UEFA Champions League, six appearances in UEFA Europa League)	0	31	4
Partizan	Total		76	8	9	0	27	2	112	10
Mechelen	2015–16	Belgian Pro League	13	0	2	0	—		15	0
Lech Poznań (Loan)	2015–16	Ekstraklasa	7	0	1	1	—		8	1
Radnički Niš	2016–17	Serbian SuperLiga	6	0	0	0	—		6	0
Rad	2017–18	Serbian SuperLiga	26	5	2	0	—		28	5
Ermis Aradippou	2018–19	Cypriot First Division	3	0	0	0	—		3	0
Rad	2018–19	Serbian SuperLiga	7	2	0	0	—		7	2
Borac Banja Luka	2019–20	Bosnian Premier League	7	0	0	0	—		7	0
Career total			286	38	21	1	48	4	355	43

=== International ===
Appearances and goals by national team and year
National team	Year	Apps	Goals
Serbia
Serbia	2011	1	0
Serbia	Total	1	0
Montenegro
Montenegro	2012	6	0
Montenegro	2013	5	0
Montenegro	2014	4	0
Montenegro	2015	2	0
Montenegro	Total	17	0
Career total		18	0

== Honours ==
Sheriff Tiraspol

- Moldovan National Division: 2008–09, 2009–10
- Moldovan Cup: 2008–09, 2009–10
- CIS Cup: 2009

Partizan

- Serbian SuperLiga: 2011–12, 2012–13, 2014–15
