= Răzvan Cociș =

Romanian footballer (born 1983)

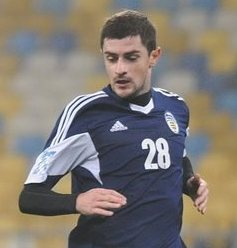
- Cociș in 2013

Personal information
- Full name: Răzvan Vasile Cociș
- Date of birth: 19 February 1983 (age 43)
- Place of birth: Cluj-Napoca, Romania
- Height: 1.81 m (5 ft 11 in)
- Position: Midfielder

Youth career
- 1992–2000: Viitorul C.U.G. Cluj
- 2000–2001: Universitatea Cluj

Senior career*
Years	Team	Apps	(Gls)
2001–2004	Universitatea Cluj	37	(14)
2004–2006	Sheriff Tiraspol	56	(24)
2007–2009	Lokomotiv Moscow	54	(4)
2010	FC Timişoara	9	(3)
2010–2011	Al-Nassr	12	(2)
2011	→ Karpaty Lviv (loan)	11	(2)
2011–2013	Rostov	40	(4)
2013–2014	Hoverla Uzhhorod	19	(3)
2014–2016	Chicago Fire	66	(7)
Total		304	(63)

International career
2003–2005	Romania U21	12	(4)
2005–2013	Romania	50	(2)
- * Club domestic league appearances and goals

Răzvan Vasile Cociș (Romanian pronunciation: [rəzˈvan ˈkotʃiʃ]; born 19 February 1983) is a Romanian former professional footballer. He was usually an attacking midfielder but could play in a variety of other midfield positions as well as up-front. He was also well known for his close control.

== Club career ==
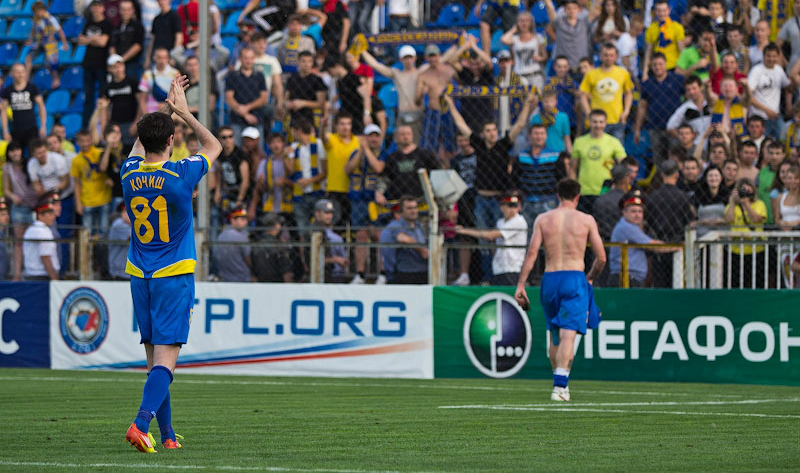
Cociș (КОЧИШ #81) in Russian championship on 18 May 2012

Cociș is one of the graduates of the prolific school of football at Universitatea Cluj where, amongst other teammates, won a national youth title. After earning a regular first team spot at not even 21 years of age, there were rumours that clubs made offers for him, including Rennes, but at the end of the season he was sold to Moldovan team Sheriff Tiraspol alongside another player of his generation, George Florescu.

He signed a contract that expired on 31 December 2009 with Lokomotiv, which cost Lokomotiv €2.6 million to sign. He scored his first goal in the Russian league against Rubin Kazan. His former clubs include U Cluj and Sheriff Tiraspol. He signed a three-month contract on 1 March 2010 with FC Timişoara until the summer, with option to renewal for five years. On 22 May, it was announced that Cociș signed a contract with Saudi Arabian side Al-Nassr.

On 25 February 2011, he moved to Ukrainian club Karpaty Lviv on loan from Al-Nassr. He scored his first goal for Karpaty, in their 1–0 win over Shakhtar Donetsk. In June, he signed a permanent deal with Karpaty after the 2010–11 season.

On 14 July 2014 it was announced Cociș had joined Chicago Fire of Major League Soccer. He re-signed with the club on 23 January 2016. On 23 November 2016 Chicago Fire announced they did not exercise his option for the next year.

== International career ==
Cociș made his national debut on 17 August 2005 against Andorra in a 2–0 win.

== Personal life ==
On 13 July 2015 Chicago Fire announced Razvan had received a US green card which qualifies him as a domestic player for MLS roster purposes.

== Career statistics ==
Appearances and goals by national team and year
National team	Year	Apps	Goals
Romania	2005	5	0
Romania	2006	8	1
Romania	2007	5	0
Romania	2008	11	1
Romania	2009	3	0
Romania	2010	7	0
Romania	2011	8	0
Romania	2012	2	0
Romania	2013	1	0
Total		50	2

Scores and results list Romania's goal tally first, score column indicates score after each Cociș goal.

#	Date	Venue	Opponent	Score	Result	Competition
1	28 February 2006	GSP Stadium, Nicosia, Cyprus	Armenia	2–0	2–0	Friendly
2	10 September 2008	Tórsvøllur, Tórshavn, Faroe Islands	Faroe Islands	1–0	1–0	2010 FIFA World Cup qualification

== Honours ==
Universitatea Cluj

- Divizia C: 2000–01

Sheriff Tiraspol

- Divizia Naţională: 2004–05, 2005–06, 2006–07
- Moldovan Cup: 2005–06
- Moldovan Super Cup: 2004, 2005

Lokomotiv Moscow

- Russian Cup: 2007
