= Alexandru Melenciuc =

Moldovan professional football player (born 1979)

Personal information
- Full name: Alexandru Melenciuc
- Date of birth: 20 March 1979 (age 47)
- Place of birth: Bender, Moldovan SSR
- Height: 1.80 m (5 ft 11 in)
- Position: Goalkeeper

Team information
- Current team: Navbahor Namangan
- Number: 1

Senior career*
Years	Team	Apps	(Gls)
1999–2001	Sheriff Tiraspol	10	(0)
2001–2002	→ loan Constructorul Cioburciu	26	(0)
2003–2006	Tiraspol	66	(0)
2006–2010	Sheriff Tiraspol	37	(0)
2011	Sogdiana Jizzakh	13	(0)
2011–2012	Iskra-Stal		(0)
2012–2013	Speranța Crihana Veche	17	(0)
2013–2014	Sogdiana Jizzakh	51	(0)
2015– ?	Navbahor Namangan	4	(0)

International career^{‡}
2002–2004	Moldova	5	(0)

Managerial career
- 2023–: Florești (Goalkeeper Coach)
- * Club domestic league appearances and goals as of 25 April 2015 ‡ National team caps and goals as of 16 April 2015

Alexandru Melenciuc (born 20 March 1979) is a Moldovan professional football player. He currently plays for Navbahor Namangan in Uzbek League.

== Career ==
He started playing career at Sheriff Tiraspol in 1999. In August 2011 Melenciuc moved to Sogdiana Jizzakh. On 14 April 2012 he signed short-term contract with FC Tighina. After playing for Tighina, he moved to FC Speranța Crihana Veche.

In February 2013 he moved to Sogdiana Jizzakh to play in 2013 Uzbek League season. After playing 2 seasons for Sogdiana in 51 matches, he joined in 2015 Navbahor Namangan.

== Honours ==
=== Club ===
Sheriff Tiraspol

- Divizia Naţională (3): 2007–08, 2008–09, 2009–10
- Moldovan Cup (3): 2008, 2009, 2010
- Moldovan Super Cup (1): 2007
