= Andrey Sosnitsky =

Belarusian footballer

Personal information
- Full name: Andrey Alekseyevich Sosnitsky
- Date of birth: 8 November 1962 (age 63)
- Place of birth: Sovetsk, Kaliningrad Oblast, Russian SFSR, Soviet Union
- Height: 1.80 m (5 ft 11 in)
- Position: Defender

Team information
- Current team: Ural Yekaterinburg (assistant coach)

Youth career
- DYuSSh Sovetsk

Senior career*
Years	Team	Apps	(Gls)
1979–1980	Krasnaya Zvezda Sovetsk		
1981	Baltika Kaliningrad	12	(3)
1981–1985	Dinamo Minsk	2	(0)
1986–1987	Dinamo Brest	52	(8)
1988	Dinamo Minsk	1	(0)
1988–1991	Dinamo Brest	129	(24)
1992–1993	Spartak Vladikavkaz	6	(0)
1993–1995	Uralmash Yekaterinburg	29	(4)
1996	Chernomorets Novorossiysk	13	(0)
1997–1998	Dinamo Brest	32	(3)
1998	Slavia Mozyr	6	(0)

International career
1994–1995	Belarus	4	(0)

Managerial career
- 1999–2001: Slavia Mozyr (assistant)
- 2002: Dinamo Brest (assistant)
- 2002–2003: Dinamo Brest
- 2004–2005: Slavia Mozyr
- 2005–2008: Dinamo Brest (assistant)
- 2008–2010: Sheriff Tiraspol (assistant)
- 2010–2011: Sheriff Tiraspol
- 2011–2012: Arsenal Kyiv (assistant)
- 2013: Kuban Krasnodar (assistant)
- 2013–2014: Lokomotiv Moscow (assistant)
- 2014–2015: Kuban Krasnodar (assistant)
- 2015: Kuban Krasnodar (caretaker)
- 2016–2020: Armavir (assistant)
- 2021: Vitebsk (assistant)
- 2022: Khimki (assistant)
- 2022: Vitebsk (assistant)
- 2022: Khimki (assistant)
- 2023: Kuban Krasnodar
- 2023–2024: Akhmat Grozny (assistant)
- 2024–2025: Arsenal Dzerzhinsk (assistant)
- 2025: Kuban Krasnodar
- 2025–: Ural Yekaterinburg (assistant)
- * Club domestic league appearances and goals

Andrey Alekseyevich Sosnitsky (Belarusian: Андрэй Аляксеевіч Сасніцкі; Russian: Андрей Алексеевич Сосницкий; born 8 November 1962) is a Belarusian professional football coach and a former player. He is an assistant coach with Russian club Ural Yekaterinburg.

As a player, he made his professional debut in the Soviet Second League in 1981 for FC Baltika Kaliningrad. During his coaching years he worked closely with Leonid Kuchuk, serving as his assistant in a number of teams.

== Honours ==
=== As coach ===
Sheriff Tiraspol

- Moldovan National Division champion: 2009–10
- Moldovan Cup winner: 2009–10
