= George Florescu =

Romanian footballer

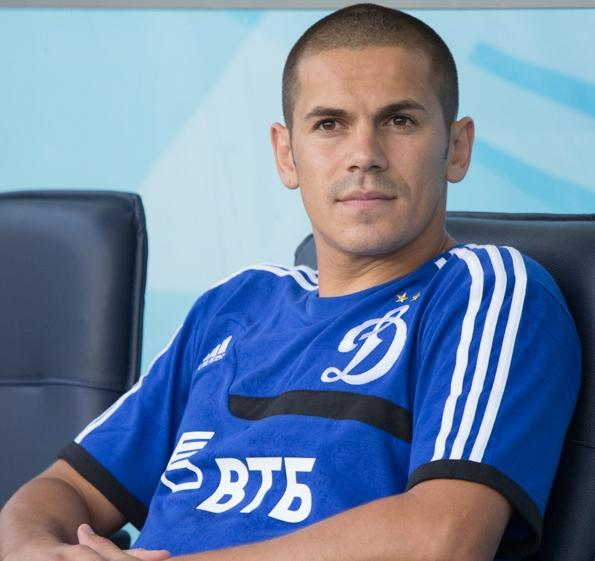
- Florescu with Dynamo Moscow in 2013

Personal information
- Full name: Gheorghe Mihai Florescu
- Date of birth: 21 May 1984 (age 42)
- Place of birth: Cluj-Napoca, Romania
- Height: 1.79 m (5 ft 10 in)
- Position: Defensive midfielder

Youth career
- Universitatea Cluj

Senior career*
Years	Team	Apps	(Gls)
2001–2004	Universitatea Cluj	38	(15)
2004–2006	Sheriff Tiraspol	51	(5)
2006–2007	Torpedo Moscow	44	(9)
2008–2010	Midtjylland	54	(3)
2010–2011	Alania Vladikavkaz	20	(1)
2011–2013	Arsenal Kyiv	32	(2)
2013	Astra Giurgiu	6	(0)
2013–2014	Dynamo Moscow	3	(1)
2014–2015	Astra Giurgiu	18	(1)
2015	Gabala	3	(0)
2016–2017	Omonia	38	(0)
2017–2020	Universitatea Cluj	64	(12)
2021–2023	Sănătatea Cluj	16	(0)
Total		385	(48)

International career
2003–2006	Romania U21	11	(4)
2010–2012	Romania	10	(1)

Managerial career
- 2021–2023: Sănătatea Cluj
- * Club domestic league appearances and goals

George Florescu (Romanian pronunciation: [floˈresku]; born 21 May 1984) is a Romanian former professional footballer who played as a defensive midfielder. In his career, Florescu also played for teams such as Universitatea Cluj, Sheriff Tiraspol, Torpedo Moscow, FC Midtjylland or Dynamo Moscow, among others.

== Club career ==
On 23 June 2015, Florescu signed a 1.5-year contract with Azerbaijan Premier League side Gabala FK.

On 20 August 2016, he signed with AC Omonia in Cyprus. He had 48 appearances with the club. On 26 May 2017 the club announced that with the end of the season the player is released.

== Personal life ==
George repented in 2023 at a Pentecostal church in his hometown.

== Career statistics ==
=== Club ===
As of match played 21 November 2015

Appearances and goals by club, season and competition
Club	Season	League			National cup		League cup		Continental		Other		Total	
Club	Season	Division	Apps	Goals	Apps	Goals	Apps	Goals	Apps	Goals	Apps	Goals	Apps	Goals
Universitatea Cluj	2001–02	Divizia B	3	1			–		–		–		3	1
Universitatea Cluj	2002–03	Divizia B	11	9			–		–		–		11	9
Universitatea Cluj	2003–04	Divizia B	24	5			–		–		–		24	5
Universitatea Cluj	Total		38	15	0	0	0	0	0	0	0	0	38	15
Sheriff Tiraspol	2004–05	Moldovan National Division	23	0			–		4	0	–		27	0
Sheriff Tiraspol	2005–06	Moldovan National Division	21	3			–		4	1	–		25	4
Sheriff Tiraspol	2006–07	Moldovan National Division	7	2			–		4	0	–		11	2
Sheriff Tiraspol	Total		51	5	0	0	0	0	12	1	0	0	63	6
Torpedo Moscow	2006	Russian Premier League	10	0	0	0	–		–		–		10	0
Torpedo Moscow	2007	Russian National League	34	9	1	0	–		–		–		35	9
Torpedo Moscow	Total		44	9	1	0	0	0	0	0	0	0	45	9
Midtjylland	2007–08	Danish Superliga	15	2			–		–		–		15	2
Midtjylland	2008–09	Danish Superliga	22	1			–		3	1	–		24	2
Midtjylland	2009–10	Danish Superliga	17	0			–		–		–		17	0
Midtjylland	Total		54	3	0	0	0	0	3	1	0	0	57	4
Alania Vladikavkaz	2010	Russian Premier League	20	1	3	0	–		–		–		23	1
Arsenal Kyiv	2011–12	Ukrainian Premier League	22	2	3	0	–		–		–		25	2
Arsenal Kyiv	2012–13	Ukrainian Premier League	10	0	1	0	–		–		–		11	0
Arsenal Kyiv	Total		32	2	4	0	0	0	0	0	0	0	36	2
Astra Giurgiu	2012–13	Liga I	6	0	2	0	–		–		–		8	0
Dynamo Moscow	2013–14	Russian Premier League	3	1	0	0	–		–		–		3	1
Astra Giurgiu	2014–15	Liga I	18	0	1	0	3	0	6	1	–		28	1
Gabala	2015–16	Azerbaijan Premier League	1	0	0	0	–		3	0	–		4	0
Career total			267	36	14	0	3	0	24	3	0	0	308	39

=== International ===
Appearances and goals by national team and year
National team	Year	Apps	Goals
Romania	2010	6	1
Romania	2011	2	0
Romania	2012	2	0
Total		10	1

Score and result list Romania's goal tally first, score column indicates score after Florescu goal.

International goal scored by George Florescu
No.	Date	Venue	Opponent	Score	Result	Competition	Ref.
1	5 June 2010	Jacques Lemans Arena, Sankt Veit an der Glan, Austria	Honduras	2–0	3–0	Friendly	

== Honours ==
Sheriff Tiraspol

- Moldovan National Division: 2004–05, 2005–06
- Moldovan Cup: 2005–06
- Moldovan Super Cup: 2004, 2005

Midtjylland

- Danish Superliga runner-up: 2007–08

Alania Vladikavkaz

- Russian Cup runner-up: 2010–11
