= Trukhanov =

Trukhanov or Truhanov (feminine: Trukhanova, Truhanova) is an East Slavic surname. Notable people with the surname include:

- Gennadiy Trukhanov (born 1965), Ukrainian politician
- Kostiantyn Trukhanov (born 1976), Ukrainian football referee and player
- Victor Truhanov (born 1991), Moldovan footballer
