= Ihar Karpovich =

Belarusian footballer

Personal information
- Date of birth: 2 August 1988 (age 38)
- Place of birth: Lida, Belarus
- Height: 1.86 m (6 ft 1 in)
- Position: Defender

Youth career
- Lida

Senior career*
Years	Team	Apps	(Gls)
2005–2006	Lida	15	(0)
2007–2010	Sheriff Tiraspol	14	(0)
2008–2009	→ Tiraspol (loan)	22	(1)
2010	→ Partizan Minsk (loan)	28	(2)
2011	Naftan Novopolotsk	5	(0)
2012	Gorodeya	3	(0)
2013	Granit Mikashevichi	21	(1)

International career
2009–2011	Belarus U21	11	(2)
- * Club domestic league appearances and goals as of 7 January 2014

Ihar Karpovich (Belarusian: Ігар Карповіч, Russian: Игорь Карпович; born 2 August 1988, Belarus) is a retired Belarus footballer. His latest club was Granit Mikashevichi in 2013.

== Honours ==
Sheriff Tiraspol

- Moldovan National Division champion: 2008–09, 2009–10
- Commonwealth of Independent States Cup winner: 2009

Naftan Novopolotsk

- Belarusian Cup winner: 2011–12
