= Vladimir Branković =

Serbian footballer

Personal information
- Full name: Vladimir Branković
- Date of birth: 22 September 1985 (age 41)
- Place of birth: Belgrade, SFR Yugoslavia
- Height: 1.81 m (5 ft 11 in)
- Positions: Centre-back; left-back

Youth career
- Bežanija

Senior career*
Years	Team	Apps	(Gls)
2003–2004	Obilić	1	(0)
2004–2005	OFK Beograd	2	(0)
2006–2007	Zrinjski Mostar	8	(0)
2007	→ Brotnjo (loan)		
2008	Napredak Kruševac	15	(1)
2008–2009	Partizan	0	(0)
2009	→ Sevojno (loan)	8	(0)
2009–2011	Sheriff Tiraspol	47	(5)
2011–2013	Vojvodina	12	(0)
2013–2014	Vitez	13	(0)
2014	Tyrnavos	2	(0)
2015	Vitez	8	(0)
2016	Spartak Subotica	3	(0)
2016	Zemun	2	(0)
2017–2019	Bačka Topola	65	(10)
2020	Radnički 1912		
- * Club domestic league appearances and goals as of 13 July 2019

Vladimir Branković (Serbian Cyrillic: Владимир Бранковић; born 22 September 1985) is a Serbian professional footballer who plays as a defender.

== Career ==
During his journeyman career, Branković represented numerous clubs in his homeland, including former national champions Obilić, OFK Beograd, Partizan, and Vojvodina. He also played abroad in three countries, winning the domestic double with Moldovan side Sheriff Tiraspol in 2010.

== Honours ==
Sevojno

- Serbian Cup: Runner-up 2008–09

Sheriff Tiraspol

- Moldovan National Division: 2009–10
- Moldovan Cup: 2009–10

Vojvodina

- Serbian Cup: Runner-up 2012–13
