= Igor Picușceac =

Moldovan footballer

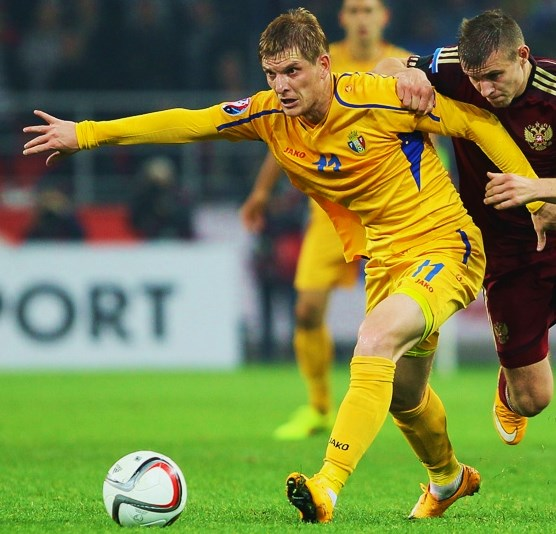
- Picușceac with Moldova in 2014

Personal information
- Date of birth: 27 March 1983 (age 43)
- Place of birth: Tiraspol, Moldavian SSR, Soviet Union
- Height: 1.84 m (6 ft 0 in)
- Position: Striker

Senior career*
Years	Team	Apps	(Gls)
2001–2003	Sheriff Tiraspol	12	(1)
2003–2007	Tiraspol	124	(30)
2008–2009	Sheriff Tiraspol	28	(5)
2009	→ Beijing Hongdeng (loan)	12	(7)
2009–2012	Krasnodar	44	(8)
2012–2015	Amkar Perm	50	(7)
2015	Sheriff Tiraspol	6	(1)
2016	Academia Chișinău	6	(2)
2016	Zaria Bălți	10	(2)
Total		292	(63)

International career
2005–2007	Moldova U21	6	(2)
2007–2015	Moldova	20	(3)

Managerial career
- 2017–2018: Krasnodar-2 (assistant)
- 2018: Krasnodar-2
- 2018–2019: Krasnodar-2 (assistant)
- 2019–2020: Noah
- 2020–2021: Akron Tolyatti
- 2022: Akzhayik
- 2022: Akzhayik (assistant)
- 2023–2024: Turan (assistant)
- 2024–2026: Milsami Orhei
- 2026–: Syunik
- * Club domestic league appearances and goals

Igor Picușceac (born 27 March 1983) is a Moldovan football coach and a former player who played as a striker.

== International career ==
Picușceac scored his first goal for Moldova in a 2–1 defeat to Israel in a 2010 FIFA World Cup qualifier match. Scored in 47th second of match, this is the fastest goal ever scored by Moldova in any match.

== Coaching career ==
In October 2020 he was hired as a manager of Akron Tolyatti.

On 1 July 2026, Armenian Premier League club Syunik announced the appointment of Picușceac as their new head coach.

== Honours ==
Sheriff Tiraspol

- Divizia Națională Champion: 2008/2009
- Moldovan Cup: 2008/2009

== International goals ==
#	Date	Venue	Opponent	Score	Result	Competition
1	10 September 2008	Chișinău	Israel	1–0	1–2	2010 FIFA World Cup qualifier
2	9 February 2011	Lagos	Andorra	1–0	2–1	Friendly
3	24 May 2014	Jerez de la Frontera	Saudi Arabia	2–0	4–0	Friendly
