= Maxim Copeliciuc =

Moldovan professional football player

Personal information
- Date of birth: 8 August 1988 (age 38)
- Position: Goalkeeper

Team information
- Current team: Tiraspol
- Number: 1

Senior career*
Years	Team	Apps	(Gls)
2007–2012	Academia UTM Chişinău	85	(0)
2012–	Tiraspol	2	(0)

International career^{‡}
2008	Moldova	1	(0)
- * Club domestic league appearances and goals as of 31 January 2014 ‡ National team caps and goals as of 14 September 2009

Maxim Copeliciuc (born 8 August 1988) is a Moldovan professional football player who currently plays for FC Tiraspol.
