= Vladimir Vusatîi =

Moldovan footballer and manager

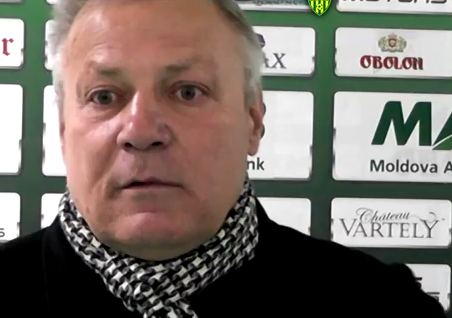
- Vusatîi in 2014

Personal information
- Date of birth: 21 August 1954 (age 72)
- Place of birth: Vinnytsia, Ukrainian SSR, Soviet Union
- Height: 1.75 m (5 ft 9 in)

Senior career*
Years	Team	Apps	(Gls)
1982	Volna Soroca		
1984	Luch Soroca		

Managerial career
- 1991: Bugeac Comrat (director)
- 1993: Nord-AM-Podillya
- 1998: Unisport Chișinău
- 2014–2015: Academia Chișinău
- 2010–2026: Moldova futsal
- * Club domestic league appearances and goals

Vladimir Vusatîi (born 21 August 1954) is a Moldovan professional football manager and former footballer.
