= Vadim Istrati =

Moldavan footballer

Personal information
- Full name: Vadim Istrati
- Date of birth: August 7, 1988 (age 38)
- Place of birth: Chișinău, Moldova
- Height: 1.78 m (5 ft 10 in)
- Position: Goalkeeper

Team information
- Current team: CF Sparta Selemet
- Number: 1

Youth career
- 2005–2008: FC Zimbru Chișinău

Senior career*
Years	Team	Apps	(Gls)
2007–2008	FC Zimbru Chișinău	-	(-)
2008–2009	FC Academia Chișinău	7	(-)
2009–2010	FC Sfîntul Gheorghe	21	(-)
2010–2011	FC Milsami Orhei	1	(-)
2011	Kramfors-Alliansen	30	(-)
2011–2014	CF Sparta Selemet	16	(-)

International career
2005	Moldova U17	-	(-)
2007	Moldova U19	3	(0)
- * Club domestic league appearances and goals

Vadim istrati (born 7 August 1988, Chișinău) is a Moldovan footballer, who currently plays for CF Sparta Selemet în "B" Division (South), as goalkeeper.
