= Aliaksei Kuchuk =

Belarusian footballer (born 1986)

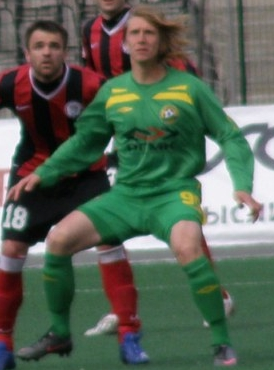
- Kuchuk with Kuban Krasnodar in 2009

Personal information
- Full name: Aliaksei Leanidavich Kuchuk
- Date of birth: 9 September 1986 (age 40)
- Place of birth: Minsk, Belarusian SSR, Soviet Union
- Height: 1.82 m (6 ft 0 in)
- Position: Forward

Youth career
- 2001: Torpedo-MAZ Minsk
- 2002–2003: Lokomotiv Minsk

Senior career*
Years	Team	Apps	(Gls)
2004	Lokomotiv Minsk	9	(0)
2005–2008	Sheriff Tiraspol	133	(64)
2008–2010	Kuban Krasnodar	14	(2)
2009–2010	→ Sheriff Tiraspol (loan)	14	(7)
2010	Ventspils	0	(0)
2010	Belshina Bobruisk	9	(1)
2011	Vitebsk	13	(5)
2011–2013	Yenisey Krasnoyarsk	30	(1)
2013–2014	Beira-Mar	5	(0)
2014	Atyrau	5	(0)
Total		232	(80)

International career
2005–2008	Belarus U21	18	(3)

Managerial career
- 2016–2017: Krumkachy Minsk (reserves)
- 2017–2019: NFK Minsk
- 2020–2021: Dinamo Minsk (assistant)
- 2021–2022: Rukh Lviv (assistant)
- * Club domestic league appearances and goals

Aliaksei Leanidavich Kuchuk (Belarusian: Аляксей Леанідавіч Кучук; Russian: Алексей Леонидович Кучук; Aleksei Leonidovich Kuchuk; born 9 September 1986) is a Belarusian football coach and former player. He is a son of Belarusian coach Leonid Kuchuk.

== Career ==
In April 2014, signed for Kazakhstan Premier League side Atyrau, leaving Atyrau in June on the same year.

== Honours ==
Sheriff Tiraspol

- Moldovan National Division: 2004–05, 2005–06, 2006–07, 2007–08, 2008–09, 2009–10
- Moldovan Cup: 2005–06, 2007–08, 2009–10
- Moldovan Super Cup: 2005, 2007

Individual

- Moldovan National Division top scorer: 2005–06, 2006–07
