= Alexandru Leucuță =

Romanian footballer

Personal information
- Full name: Alexandru Dan Leucuță
- Date of birth: 1 October 1987 (age 39)
- Place of birth: Ineu, Romania
- Height: 1.79 m (5 ft 10 1/2 in)
- Position: Forward

Youth career
- 2003–2005: Tricotaje Ineu

Senior career*
Years	Team	Apps	(Gls)
2005–2006	Ineu	4	(0)
2006–2008	Politehnica Iaşi	3	(0)
2008–2010	UTA Arad	0	(0)
2010–2011	Național Sebiș	0	(0)
2011–2014	Békéscsaba	79	(25)
2014–2015	FC Olt Slatina	22	(4)
2015–2016	Şoimii Pâncota	27	(6)
- * Club domestic league appearances and goals as of 8 August 2016

Dan Alexandru Leucuță (born 1 October 1987 in Ineu, Romania) is a Romanian football player. He is known for his goalscoring ability.
