= Kwami Eninful =

Togolese footballer

Personal information
- Full name: Kwami Komlan Kacla Akoete Eninful
- Date of birth: 20 November 1984 (age 41)
- Place of birth: Sokodé, Togo
- Height: 1.84 m (6 ft 0 in)
- Positions: Centre-back; defensive midfielder

Senior career*
Years	Team	Apps	(Gls)
2002–2005	Douanes Lomé	120	(11)
2006–2009	Sheriff Tiraspol	32	(0)
2008	→ Al-Ittihad SCSC (loan)	10	(0)
2009–2010	US Monastir	10	(0)
2010–2013	AS Marsa	44	(2)
2014	Sapins		
2014–2016	Ittihad Khemisset		
2016–2018	Dynamic Togolais		

International career
1999–2010	Togo	24	(1)
- * Club domestic league appearances and goals

Kwami Eninful (born 20 November 1984) is a Togolese former professional footballer who played as a centre-back or defensive midfielder for the Togo national football team.

== Career ==
Eninful began his career in 2002 with the Togolese-based club AS Douanes Lomé and moved in January 2006 to Sheriff Tiraspol in Moldova. In January 2008 he was loaned out from Sheriff to the Libyan top club Al-Ittihad Tripoli and played ten games for the club before he moved back in July 2008 to Sheriff. On 15 July 2009, Eninful signed for Tunisian Ligue Professionnelle 1 club Union Sportive Monastir. After one season with Union Sportive Monastir, he joined Tunisian rival AS La Marsa.
