= Adrian Pătraș =

Moldovan footballer

Personal information
- Full name: Adrian Pătraș
- Date of birth: 28 September 1984 (age 42)
- Place of birth: Chișinău, Moldova
- Height: 1.86 m (6 ft 1 in)
- Position: Goalkeeper

Team information
- Current team: FC Costuleni
- Number: 1

Senior career*
Years	Team	Apps	(Gls)
2009–2010	FC Milsami	11	(0)
2010–2011	FC Iskra-Stal	0	(0)
2011–2013	FC Nistru Otaci	30	(0)
2013–	FC Costuleni	25	(0)
- Spartak Varna
- * Club domestic league appearances and goals as of 30 May 2014

Adrian Pătraș (born 28 September 1984) is a Moldovan football goalkeeper who plays for club FC Costuleni.
