= Iurie Livandovschi =

Moldavian footballer

Personal information
- Full name: Iurie Livandovschi
- Date of birth: 17 February 1988 (age 38)
- Place of birth: Chișinău, Moldova
- Height: 1.79 m (5 ft 10 1/2 in)
- Position: Forward

Senior career*
Years	Team	Apps	(Gls)
2008–2009	FC Zimbru Chișinău	14	(3)
2009–2010	FC Sfîntul Gheorghe	6	(2)
2010–2011	FC Rapid Ghidighici	35	(2)
2011–2012	FC Milsami	8	(0)
2012–2013	FC Academia Chișinău	38	(9)
2013	FC Rapid Ghidighici	15	(6)

International career
	Moldova U17	7	(0)
	Moldova U19	4	(1)
	Moldova U21	1	(1)
- * Club domestic league appearances and goals as of 30 May 2014

Iurie Livandovschi, also spelled Levandovschi (born 17 February 1988) is a Moldavian footballer who plays as forward.
