= Lucho Rodríguez =

Argentine footballer (born 1985)

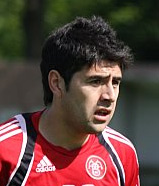

Personal information
- Full name: Luis Antonio Rodríguez
- Date of birth: 4 March 1985 (age 41)
- Place of birth: Necochea, Argentina
- Height: 1.82 m (6 ft 0 in)
- Position: Midfielder

Team information
- Current team: Cruzeiro Esporte Clube
- Number: 97

Youth career
- Arsenal de Sarandí

Senior career*
Years	Team	Apps	(Gls)
2006–2008	Temperley	47	(2)
2008–2010	FC Sheriff Tiraspol	50	(3)
2010	Djurgården	16	(0)
2011	AaB	1	(0)
2012	Sunkar	12	(2)
2012	Hammarby IF	7	(0)
- * Club domestic league appearances and goals as of 8 December 2012

Luis Antonio "Lucho" Rodríguez (born March 4, 1985) is an Argentine football defender, currently playing for Swedish club Hammarby. Rodriguez played for Swedish side Djurgårdens IF during the 2010 fall, however the contract was not extended after the 2010 season.
