= Victor Truhanov =

Moldovan footballer

Personal information
- Full name: Victor Truhanov
- Date of birth: 30 January 1991 (age 35)
- Place of birth: Tiraspol, Moldova
- Height: 1.80 m (5 ft 11 in)
- Position: Midfielder

Team information
- Current team: Dinamo-Auto
- Number: 30

Senior career*
Years	Team	Apps	(Gls)
2008–2009	FC Sheriff Tiraspol	14	(3)
2009–2010	FC Tiraspol	15	(0)
2010–2012	FC Iskra-Stal	34	(4)
2012	FC Nistru Otaci	19	(0)
2012–2013	FC Academia Chișinău	11	(1)
2013–2014	Dinamo-Auto	15	(5)
2014	Putnok VSE	11	(0)
2015	FC Costuleni	7	(1)
2015–2016	FC Saxan	24	(2)
2016–	Dinamo-Auto	29	(2)
- * Club domestic league appearances and goals as of 1 March 2018

Victor Truhanov (born 30 January 1991 in Tiraspol) is a Moldovan football midfielder who plays for Dinamo-Auto Tiraspol.

== Club statistics ==
- Total matches played in Moldovan First League: 119 matches - 15 goal
