= Maxim Franțuz =

Moldovan footballer

Maxim Franţuz
Personal information
- Date of birth: 4 May 1986 (age 40)
- Place of birth: Chișinău, Moldovan SSR
- Height: 1.79 m (5 ft 10 1/2 in)
- Position: Midfielder

Team information
- Current team: FC Zimbru Chişinău

Senior career*
Years	Team	Apps	(Gls)
2003–	FC Zimbru Chişinău	117	(28)
2011–	Perugia Calcio	0	(0)

International career^{‡}
2008–	Moldova	2	(0)
- * Club domestic league appearances and goals ‡ National team caps and goals as of 14 September 2009

Maxim Franţuz (born 4 May 1986, in Chișinău) is a Moldovan professional football player. As of September 2009, he plays for FC Zimbru Chişinău.
