= Andrei Corneencov =

Moldovan footballer

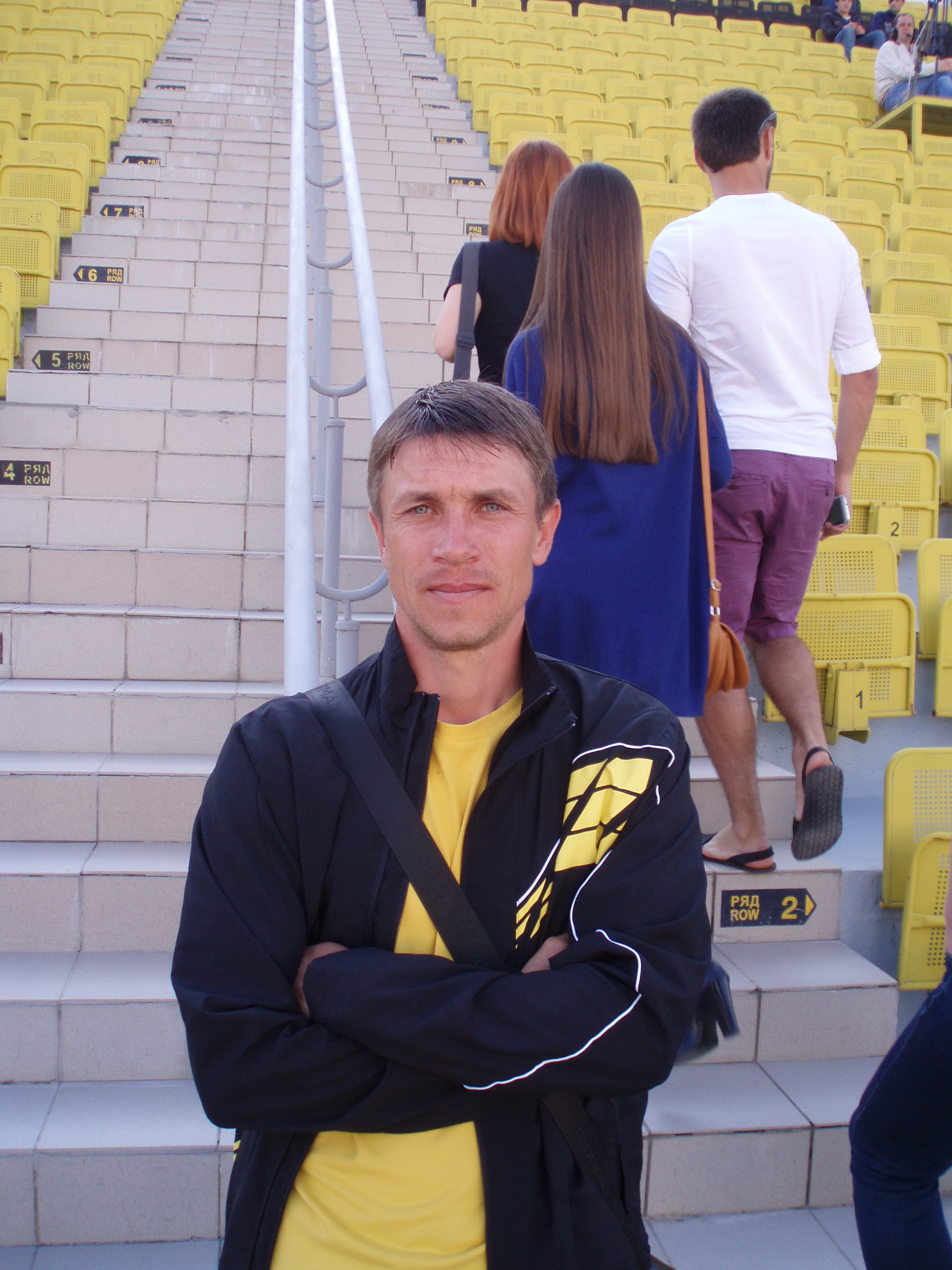
- Corneencov in 2014

Personal information
- Date of birth: 1 April 1982 (age 44)
- Place of birth: Tiraspol, Moldavian SSR, Soviet Union
- Height: 1.83 m (6 ft 0 in)
- Position: Midfielder

Senior career*
Years	Team	Apps	(Gls)
2001–2006	Tiraspol	78	(10)
2006–2010	Sheriff Tiraspol	89	(11)
2010	Tobol	4	(0)
2010–2011	Tiraspol	6	(1)

International career^{‡}
2004–2009	Moldova	23	(0)
- * Club domestic league appearances and goals as of 1 April 2014 ‡ National team caps and goals as of 1 April 2014

Andrei Corneencov (born 1 April 1982) is a former Moldovan international footballer.
