= Florent Rouamba =

Burkinabé footballer (born 1986)

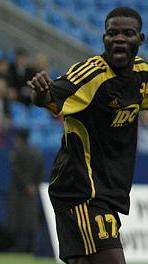
- Rouamba in 2009

Personal information
- Date of birth: 31 December 1986 (age 39)
- Place of birth: Ouagadougou, Burkina Faso
- Height: 1.82 m (6 ft 0 in)
- Position: Defensive midfielder

Youth career
- 1999–2002: US Ouagadougou

Senior career*
Years	Team	Apps	(Gls)
2003–2005	ASFA Yennega		
2006–2012	Sheriff Tiraspol	141	(10)
2013	Charlton Athletic	0	(0)
2014–2015	CA Bastia	38	(0)
2015–2020	Saint-Pryvé Saint-Hilaire	110	(2)

International career
2004–2014	Burkina Faso	50	(1)
Medal record
Representing Burkina Faso
Africa Cup of Nations
Runner-up	2013 South Africa
- * Club domestic league appearances and goals

Florent Rouamba (born 31 December 1986) is a Burkinabé former professional footballer who played as a defensive midfielder. He represented Burkina Faso at international level, making 50 appearances.

== Club career ==
Rouamba began his career with Union Sportive de Ouagadougou and was in January 2006 scouted from Sheriff Tiraspol. They won in 2006 the league and cup also the double with FC Sheriff. He won the Moldova Championship and Cup in 2008. A highlight of his career was when he scored a 40-yard goal in the Europa Cup against AZ Alkmaar.

After an impressive performance in the African Nations Cup where Burkina Faso lost in the finals to Nigeria, Roumba began to attract more serious attention. On 28 March 2013, Rouamba signed a contract with English club Charlton Athletic until the end of the 2013 season. This was possible because the transfer rules state that players without a club may join a club any time as was the case in joining Charlton Athletic. At the end of the 2012–13 season, he left Charlton without making any first-team appearances.

On 8 January 2014, Rouamba joined French Ligue 2 side CA Bastia.

== International career ==
Rouamba had played for the Burkina Faso under-21 team. He is current member for the senior team of his homeland Burkina Faso.
