= 2005–06 Moldovan National Division =

Moldovan National Division
- Season: 2005–06
- Champions: Sheriff Tiraspol
- Champions League: Sheriff Tiraspol
- UEFA Cup: Zimbru Chișinău; Nistru Otaci
- Intertoto Cup: FC Tiraspol
- Matches: 112
- Goals: 237 (2.12 per match)
- Top goalscorer: Aliaksei Kuchuk (13 goals)

The 2005–06 Moldovan National Division (Romanian: Divizia Națională) was the 15th season of top-tier football in Moldova.

== League standings ==
Pos	Team	Pld	W	D	L	GF	GA	GD	Pts	Qualification
1	Sheriff Tiraspol (C)	28	22	5	1	57	11	+46	71	Qualification for the Champions League first qualifying round
2	Zimbru Chișinău	28	15	8	5	47	20	+27	53	Qualification for the UEFA Cup first qualifying round
3	Tiraspol	28	8	13	7	24	21	+3	37	Qualification for the Intertoto Cup first round
4	Tiligul-Tiras Tiraspol	28	7	13	8	22	23	−1	34	
5	Nistru Otaci	28	6	13	9	24	27	−3	31	Qualification for the UEFA Cup first qualifying round
6	Dacia Chișinău	28	7	9	12	28	39	−11	30	
7	Politehnica Chișinău	28	5	10	13	18	37	−19	25	
8	Dinamo Bender	28	2	9	17	17	59	−42	15	

(C) Champions

NB: no relegation due to extension of the league to 10 clubs

== Results ==
=== First and second round ===
Home \ Away	DAC	DIN	NIS	POL	SHE	TIL	TIR	ZIM
Dacia Chișinău		2–1	0–0	1–0	0–1	1–1	1–2	0–2
Dinamo Bender	0–2		2–1	0–0	0–1	2–2	0–4	0–3
Nistru Otaci	1–2	1–0		1–1	0–0	0–1	0–1	2–1
Politehnica Chișinău	1–1	2–2	1–3		0–1	2–1	1–0	0–4
Sheriff Tiraspol	5–1	3–1	2–0	4–0		2–0	1–0	3–0
Tiligul-Tiras Tiraspol	0–0	0–0	1–0	3–0	1–1		1–1	1–1
Tiraspol	2–2	1–0	0–0	1–0	0–2	0–0		0–1
Zimbru Chișinău	0–1	5–1	1–1	5–2	0–1	2–0	2–1	

Source: EU-Football.info
Legend: Blue = home team win; Yellow = draw; Red = away team win.

=== Third and fourth round ===
Home \ Away	DAC	DIN	NIS	POL	SHE	TIL	TIR	ZIM
Dacia Chișinău		5–2	1–1	0–0	0–1	2–0	1–2	1–1
Dinamo Bender	1–0		1–1	0–0	1–7	0–1	1–1	0–1
Nistru Otaci	3–0	3–1		2–1	0–0	0–0	1–1	1–1
Politehnica Chișinău	2–0	1–0	1–1		0–2	0–1	0–0	0–1
Sheriff Tiraspol	3–0	4–0	4–1	1–0		2–1	2–1	0–0
Tiligul-Tiras Tiraspol	3–1	1–1	0–0	0–1	2–1		0–0	0–0
Tiraspol	2–2	0–0	1–0	1–1	0–0	2–1		0–0
Zimbru Chișinău	2–1	7–0	2–0	1–1	2–3	1–0	1–0	

Source: EU-Football.info
Legend: Blue = home team win; Yellow = draw; Red = away team win.

== Top goalscorers ==
	Player	Club	Goals
1	(Belarus) Alexey Kuchuk	Sheriff Tiraspol	13
2	(Moldova) Sergiu Chirilov	Zimbru Chișinău	11
3	(Romania) Răzvan Cociș	Sheriff Tiraspol	10
4	(Moldova) Maxim Franțuz	Zimbru Chișinău	9
5	(Moldova) Ghenadie Orbu	Dacia Chișinău	8
