= FC Academia Chișinău =

Academia Chișinău
- Full name: Fotbal Club Academia Chișinău
- Founded: 2 June 2006
- Dissolved: 2017
- Ground: Ghidighici Stadium
- Capacity: 1,500
- 2016–17: Divizia Națională, 8th of 11 (withdrew)
Home colours	Away colours

Academia Chișinău was a Moldovan football club from Chișinău. They played in the Divizia Națională, the top division in Moldovan football.

== History ==
Academia came into existence in 2006 when Igor Dobrovolski, Alexandru Cojuhari, and Eduard Rotari decided to create a club with which to facilitate the growth of football talent in Moldova. The club began its journey in the second Moldovan football division, the Divizia "A". By the end of their second season in 2007–08, Academia was promoted to the Divizia Națională. Upon promotion, the club signed a partnership agreement with the Technical University of Moldova, and became known as Academia UTM Chișinău.

== List of seasons ==
Season	League									Cup	Ref
Season	Division	Pos	Pld	W	D	L	GF	GA	Pts	Cup	Ref
2006–07	Divizia A	10th	26	9	5	12	38	47	32	First round	
2007–08	Divizia A	↑ 3rd	32	18	10	4	73	23	64	Round of 16	
2008–09	Divizia Națională	11th	30	6	6	18	27	49	24	Second round	
2009–10	Divizia Națională	7th	33	11	9	13	36	37	42	Quarter-finals	
2010–11	Divizia Națională	9th	39	14	10	15	44	37	52	Quarter-finals	
2011–12	Divizia Națională	9th	33	6	13	14	32	48	31	Round of 16	
2012–13	Divizia Națională	7th	33	12	8	13	55	52	44	Second round	
2013–14	Divizia Națională	9th	33	5	4	24	26	88	19	Quarter-finals	
2014–15	Divizia Națională	7th	24	5	2	17	18	47	17	Round of 16	
2015–16	Divizia Națională	9th	27	5	6	16	18	42	21	Quarter-finals	
2016–17	Divizia Națională	8th	30	8	3	19	21	52	27	Round of 16	

== Managers ==
- (Russia) Igor Dobrovolski
- (Moldova) Vitalie Culibaba / (Moldova) Oleg Bejenari
- (Moldova) Serghei Stroenco (2010–11)
- (Moldova) Veaceslav Rusnac (July 1, 2011 – Sept 5, 2012)
- (Ukraine) Volodymyr Knysh (Sept 4, 2012 – May 31, 2013)
- (Moldova) Vitalie Mostovoi (July 26, 2013 – Dec 19, 2013)
- (Moldova) Valeriu Catana (Jan 18, 2014 – July 25, 2014)
- (Moldova) Vladimir Vusatîi (July 25, 2014–June, 2015)
- (Ukraine) Yuriy Hroshev ( June, 2015–Sept, 2015)
- (Moldova) Vladimir Vusatîi (Sept, 2015–Oct, 2015)
- (Moldova) Vlad Goian (Oct, 2015 – 2016)
- (Moldova) Serghei Secu (2017)

== Notable players ==
- (Moldova) Igor Bugaiov
- (Moldova) Alexandru Dedov
- (Moldova) Radu Gînsari
- (Moldova) Alexandru Suvorov
- (Moldova) Petru Leucă
- (Russia) Igor Lambarschi

== See also ==
- Official website (in Romanian and Russian)
- Profile at DiviziaNationala.com (in Romanian) (archived)
