= 2006–07 Moldovan National Division =

Moldovan National Division
- Season: 2006–07
- Champions: Sheriff Tiraspol
- Champions League: Sheriff Tiraspol
- UEFA Cup: Zimbru Chișinău; Nistru Otaci
- Intertoto Cup: Dacia Chișinău
- Matches: 180
- Goals: 385 (2.14 per match)
- Top goalscorer: Aliaksei Kuchuk (17 goals)

The 2006–07 Moldovan National Division (Romanian: Divizia Națională) was the 16th season of top-tier football in Moldova.

== Overview ==
FC Sheriff Tiraspol won their seventh consecutive championship, with the league having expanded to include ten teams for the first time since the 1999–2000 season.

== League standings ==
| Pos | Team | Pld | W | D | L | GF | GA | GD | Pts | Qualification |
|---|---|---|---|---|---|---|---|---|---|---|
| 1 | Sheriff Tiraspol (C) | 36 | 28 | 8 | 0 | 70 | 7 | +63 | 92 | Qualification for the Champions League first qualifying round |
| 2 | Zimbru Chișinău | 36 | 21 | 8 | 7 | 63 | 23 | +40 | 71 | Qualification for the UEFA Cup first qualifying round |
| 3 | Nistru Otaci | 36 | 16 | 9 | 11 | 44 | 36 | +8 | 57 | Qualification for the UEFA Cup first qualifying round |
| 4 | Dacia Chișinău | 36 | 13 | 16 | 7 | 36 | 30 | +6 | 55 | Qualification for the Intertoto Cup first round |
| 5 | Tiraspol | 36 | 10 | 16 | 10 | 37 | 32 | +5 | 46 | |
| 6 | Olimpia Bălți | 36 | 12 | 6 | 18 | 38 | 50 | −12 | 42 | |
| 7 | Politehnica Chișinău | 36 | 7 | 12 | 17 | 29 | 47 | −18 | 33 | |
| 8 | Tiligul-Tiras Tiraspol | 36 | 6 | 15 | 15 | 23 | 46 | −23 | 33 | |
| 9 | Iskra-Stal Rîbnița | 36 | 6 | 13 | 17 | 22 | 43 | −21 | 31 | |
| 10 | Dinamo Bender | 36 | 3 | 13 | 20 | 24 | 72 | −48 | 22 | |

Source: rsssf.com
(C) Champions

NB: no relegation as top level extended to 12 clubs

== Results ==
=== First and second round ===
| Home \ Away | DAC | DIN | ISK | NIS | OLI | POL | SHE | ZIM | TIL | TIR |
|---|---|---|---|---|---|---|---|---|---|---|
| Dacia Chișinău | | 0–0 | 1–1 | 2–2 | 1–0 | 1–0 | 0–0 | 1–1 | 1–0 | 0–0 |
| Dinamo Bender | 0–0 | | 1–0 | 0–0 | 2–2 | 0–1 | 0–3 | 0–1 | 2–2 | 2–1 |
| Iskra-Stal Rîbnița | 0–0 | 1–1 | | 0–3 (Note: The match between Iskra-Stal Rîbnița and Nistru Otaci (3–0) was awarded with 0–3 win for away team.) | 1–0 | 0–0 | 0–3 | 0–2 | 2–0 | 1–3 |
| Nistru Otaci | 1–1 | 1–1 | 2–1 | | 3–2 | 2–1 | 0–1 | 2–0 | 0–0 | 1–0 |
| Olimpia Bălți | 1–3 | 2–2 | 0–1 | 3–1 | | 0–0 | 1–3 | 3–4 | 5–3 | 0–2 |
| Politehnica Chișinău | 0–2 | 2–0 | 1–1 | 2–1 | 1–1 | | 0–3 | 0–1 | 1–1 | 3–1 |
| Sheriff Tiraspol | 1–0 | 4–0 | 4–0 | 2–1 | 4–0 | 2–1 | | 0–0 | 0–0 | 3–0 |
| Zimbru Chișinău | 1–1 | 2–1 | 1–1 | 2–0 | 5–0 | 2–0 | 0–0 | | 4–0 | 0–0 |
| Tiligul-Tiras Tiraspol | 0–2 | 2–1 | 1–1 | 0–2 | 0–1 | 0–2 | 0–2 | 1–1 | | 0–1 |
| Tiraspol | 1–1 | 4–0 | 1–1 | 0–0 | 2–1 | 5–0 | 0–3 | 0–1 | 1–1 | |

Source: EU-Football.info
Legend: Blue = home team win; Yellow = draw; Red = away team win.

=== Third and fourth round ===
| Home \ Away | DAC | DIN | ISK | NIS | OLI | POL | SHE | ZIM | TIL | TIR |
|---|---|---|---|---|---|---|---|---|---|---|
| Dacia Chișinău | | 2–2 | 1–0 | 0–2 | 1–2 | 0–0 | 0–0 | 1–2 | 0–1 | 0–0 |
| Dinamo Bender | 1–2 | | 1–0 | 0–1 | 0–4 | 2–2 | 0–3 | 0–2 | 0–1 | 2–2 |
| Iskra-Stal Rîbnița | 0–1 | 1–1 | | 2–1 | 0–2 | 1–1 | 0–1 | 1–0 | 0–0 | 1–1 |
| Nistru Otaci | 1–2 | 4–0 | 1–0 | | 2–1 | 1–0 | 0–1 | 2–1 | 1–1 | 3–2 |
| Olimpia Bălți | 0–1 | 1–0 | 0–2 | 0–0 | | 1–0 | 0–1 | 1–0 | 1–0 | 0–0 |
| Politehnica Chișinău | 3–4 | 4–0 | 2–1 | 0–1 | 0–1 | | 0–0 | 0–2 | 0–0 | 0–0 |
| Sheriff Tiraspol | 1–0 | 5–0 | 0–0 | 3–0 | 2–0 | 3–0 | | 2–0 | 4–2 | 2–1 |
| Zimbru Chișinău | 4–0 | 6–0 | 3–0 | 3–1 | 2–1 | 4–1 | 1–2 | | 2–0 | 0–1 |
| Tiligul-Tiras Tiraspol | 1–3 | 1–1 | 2–1 | 1–0 | 1–0 | 1–1 | 0–0 | 0–3 | | 0–0 |
| Tiraspol | 1–1 | 3–1 | 1–0 | 1–1 | 0–1 | 2–0 | 0–2 | 0–0 | 0–0 | |

Source: EU-Football.info
Legend: Blue = home team win; Yellow = draw; Red = away team win.

== Top goalscorers ==
| Pos | Player | Scored for | Goals |
|---|---|---|---|
| 1 | (Belarus) Aliaksei Kuchuk | Sheriff Tiraspol | 17 |
| 2 | (Moldova) Vladimir Țaranu | Nistru Otaci | 16 |
| 3 | (Russia) Alexei Zhdanov | Zimbru Chișinău | 14 |
| 4 | (Moldova) Sergiu Chirilov | Zimbru Chișinău | 12 |
| 4 | (Romania) Marian Pârșă | Sheriff Tiraspol | 9 |
| 4 | (Moldova) Igor Picusciac | FC Tiraspol | 9 |
