= 2008–09 Moldovan Cup =

Cupa Moldovei

Tournament details
- Country: Moldova

Final positions
- Champions: Sheriff
- Runners-up: Dacia

2008–09 Moldovan Cup was the eighteenth season of the Moldovan annual football tournament. The competition started on 24 September 2008 with the first round and ended with the final held in the spring of 2009. The defending champions were Sheriff.

== Preliminary round ==
This round featured 24 teams from Moldovan lower leagues. The games were played on 31 August 2008.

Team 1	Score	Team 2
Volna	1–1 (aet, p. 3–2)	Floreşti
Costuleni	1–1 (aet, p. 5–4)	Flacăra
Riscani	2–3	Glodeni
Drochia	2–0	Teleneşti
Real-Succes	2–3	Cricova
CS Tiras	0–0 (aet, p. 4–3)	Sinteza
FC Victoria	w/o	Cantemir
Tiras	1–3	Locomotiv Bălţi
Vulcănesti	8–0	Slobozia Mare
Speranţa	4–6	Kolos
Ceadîr Orizont	5–1	Maiak
Fortuna	7–0	Congaz

== First round ==
In this round entered winners from the preliminary round and 12 new teams, also from Moldovan lower leagues. The games were played on 24 September 2008.

Team 1	Score	Team 2
Volna	0–3	Locomotiv Bălţi
Costuleni	3–1	Olimp
Glodeni	2–1	Viitorul Orhei
Drochia	1–3	Podiş
Cricova	1–0	Izvoraş-67
Tiras	1–0	Intersport-Aroma
Victoria Bardar	5–2	Eikomena
Locomotiva Basarabească	w/o	Floreni
Vulcăneşti	0–4	Cahul-2005
Kolos	1–9	Găgăuziya
Ceadîr Orizont	1–0	MIPAN
Fortuna	3–1	Sfîntul Gheorghe

== Second round ==
This round featured winners from the previous round as well as 4 new teams. The games were played on 8 October 2008.

Team 1	Score	Team 2
CSCA-Rapid	3–1	Academia
Costuleni	1–3	Locomotiv Bălţi
Glodeni	0–4	Podiş
Tiras	0–4	Cricova
Locomotiva Basarabească	1–2	Victoria Bardar
Găgăuziya	2–1	Cahul-2005
Ceadîr Orizont	0–4	Fortuna
FC Viişoara	2–4	Dinamo Bender

== Third round ==
In this round entered winners from the previous round and the 8 remaining teams from the Moldovan National Division. The games were played on 22 October 2008.

Team 1	Score	Team 2
Sheriff	1–0	CSCA-Rapid
Iskra-Stal	2–0	Locomotiv Bălţi
Tiraspol	4–1	Podiş
Cricova	0–4	Olimpia
Tiligul-Tiras	3–1	Victoria Bardar
Găgăuziya	0–4	Dacia
Zimbru	8–0	Fortuna
Dinamo Bender	2–4	Nistru

== Quarterfinals ==
The first legs were played on 5 November 2008. The second legs were played on 22–24 November 2008.

Team 1	Agg.	Team 2	1st leg	2nd leg
Iskra-Stal	0–2	Sheriff	0–2	0–0
Tiraspol	3–3 (a)	Olimpia	1–1	2–2
Tiligul-Tiras	1–3	Dacia	1–1	0–2
Nistru	0–3	Zimbru	0–0	0–3

== Semifinals ==
The first legs were played on 8 April 2009. The second legs were played on 29 April 2009.

Team 1	Agg.	Team 2	1st leg	2nd leg
Sheriff	5–3	Tiraspol	2–1	3–2
Dacia	3–2	Zimbru	2–1	1–1

== Final ==
23 May 2009
19:00 CET

Sheriff	2–0	Dacia
Balima 48'; Rouamba 87'	Report

Zimbru, Chişinău
