= 2009–10 Moldovan Cup =

Cupa Moldovei

Tournament details
- Country: Moldova
- Teams: 32

Final positions
- Champions: Sheriff
- Runners-up: Dacia

Tournament statistics
- Matches played: 30
- Goals scored: 73 (2.43 per match)

2009–10 Moldovan Cup was the nineteenth season of the Moldovan annual football tournament. The competition started on 16 September 2009 with the first round and ended with the final held in spring 2010. The defending champions were Sheriff, who won their sixth cup final last season, and defended their title this season.

== First round ==
This round involved 16 teams, including four from the Moldovan National Division: CSCA-Rapid, Academia, Viitorul Orhei and Sfîntul Gheorghe. These matches took place on 16 September 2009.

Team 1	Score	Team 2
Costuleni	0–2	CSCA-Rapid
FC Dava Soroca	0–3	Academia
FC Olimp Ungheni	1–1 (aet); 7–6 (p.)	Locomotiv Bălţi
Cricova	2–1 (aet)	Intersport-Aroma
FC Viişoara	1–2	Viitorul Orhei
Universitatea Agrară	2–1	Fortuna
FC Cahul-2005	1–0	Sfîntul Gheorghe
FC Victoria	1–3 (aet)	RS Lilcora

== Second round ==
This round featured the eight winners from the previous round as well as the eight remaining clubs from the Moldovan National Division. The matches were played on 30 September 2009 except for the match between Sheriff and CSCA-Rapid, which took place on 22 November 2009.

Team 1	Score	Team 2
Nistru	0–2	Academia
FC Olimp Ungheni	0–1	Iskra-Stal
Cricova	0–1	Dinamo Bender
Olimpia	2–1	RS Lilcora
Viitorul Orhei	0–2	Dacia
Tiraspol	3–2 (aet)	FC Cahul-2005
Zimbru	8–0	Universitatea Agrară
Sheriff	5–0	CSCA-Rapid

== Quarterfinals ==
This round featured the eight winners from the previous round and was played over two legs. The first legs were played on 22 November 2009 and the second legs were played on 28 November 2009 except for the matches between Sheriff and Academia, which were played on 23 February and 30 March 2010.

Team 1	Agg.	Team 2	1st leg	2nd leg
Dinamo Bender	0–5	Iskra-Stal	0–2	0–3
Olimpia	3–1	Zimbru	3–1	0–0
Tiraspol	1–3	Dacia	0–0	1–3
Sheriff	1–0	Academia	0–0	1–0 (aet)

== Semifinals ==
This round featured the four winners from the previous round and is played over two legs. The first legs took place on 14 April 2010 and the second legs took place on 28 April 2010.

Team 1	Agg.	Team 2	1st leg	2nd leg
Sheriff	(a) 1–1	Iskra-Stal	0–0	1–1
Dacia	5–2	Olimpia	4–2	1–0

== Final ==
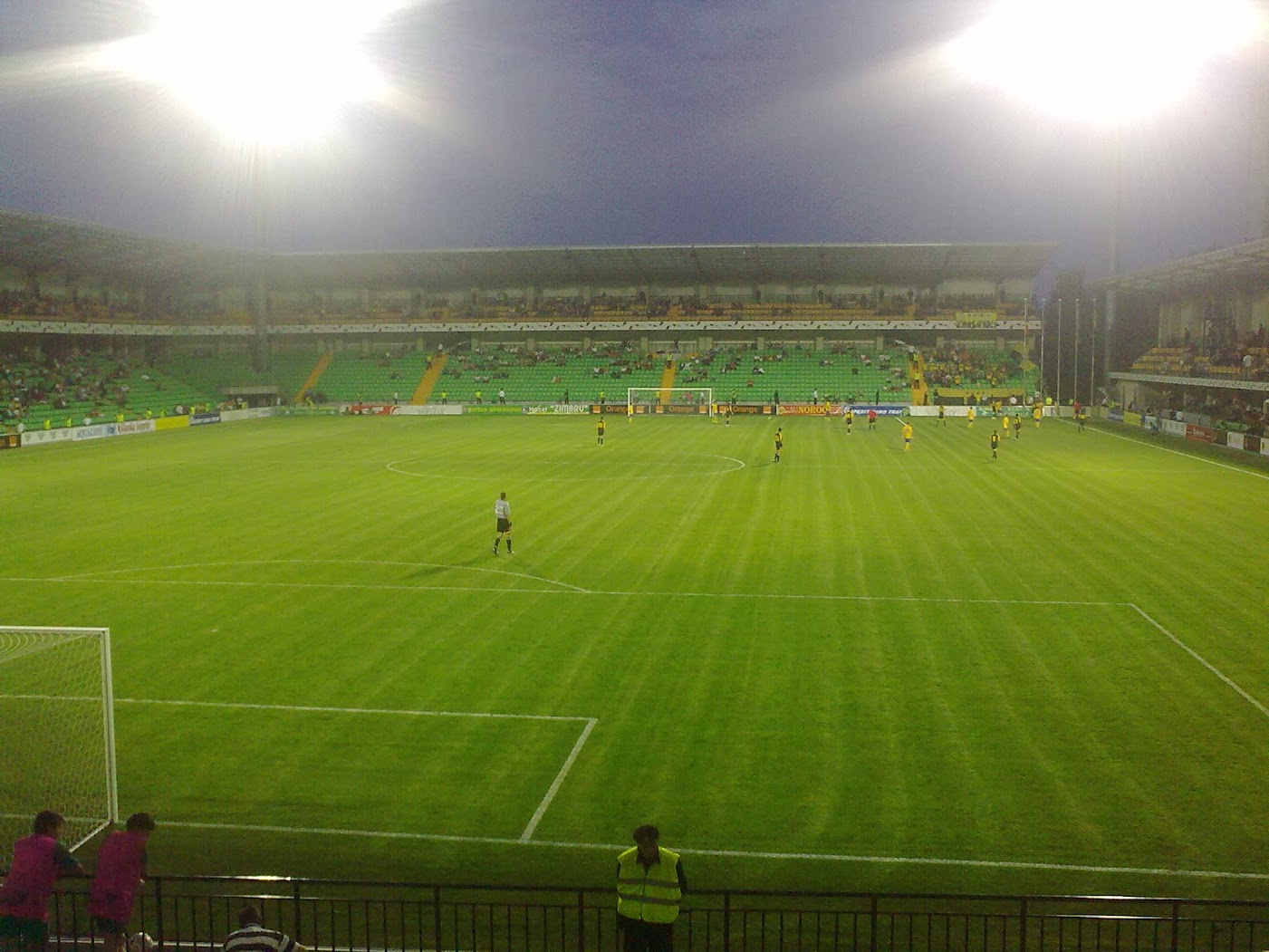

May 30, 2010
19:30

Dacia	0 – 2	Sheriff
	Report	França 27', 52'

Zimbru Stadium, Chişinău

== Top goalscorers ==
#	Scorer	Goals (Pen.)	Team
1	(Brazil) Jymmy França	4	Sheriff
1	(Moldova) Veaceslav Sofroni	3	Zimbru
1	(Ukraine) Roman Svetlichniy	3	Iskra-Stal
3	(Moldova) Andrei Corneencov	2	Sheriff
3	(Moldova) Gheorghe Andronic	2	Zimbru
3	(Moldova) Eugen Sidorenco	2	Zimbru
3	(Ghana) Eric Sackey	2	Dacia
3	(Moldova) Ghenadie Orbu	2	Dacia
