= 2008–09 Moldovan National Division =

Moldovan National Division
- Season: 2008–09
- Champions: Sheriff Tiraspol
- Relegated: Politehnica Chișinău
- Champions League: Sheriff Tiraspol
- Europa League: Dacia Chișinău; Iskra-Stal Rîbnița; Zimbru Chișinău
- Matches: 165
- Goals: 389 (2.36 per match)
- Top goalscorer: Oleg Andronic (14 goals)

The 2008–09 Moldovan National Division (Romanian: Divizia Națională) was the 18th season of top-tier football in Moldova. The season started on 2 July 2008 and ended on 17 May 2009.

Just prior to the start of the season, FC Politehnica Chișinău withdrew from the competition, causing the league to play with 11 teams this year. Further, CSCA-Steaua Chișinău merged with Rapid Ghidighici. The new club play under the name CSCA-Rapid Chișinău.

== Clubs ==
Location of teams in Moldovan National Division 2008–09

Club	Location	Stadium	Capacity
FC Academia UTM	Chișinău	Dinamo Stadium (Chișinău)	2,692
CSCA-Rapid Chișinău	Ghidighici	Ghidighici Stadium	2,000
FC Dacia	Chișinău	Stadionul Republican	8,100
FC Dinamo	Bender	Dinamo Stadium (Bender)	5,061
FC Iskra-Stal	Rîbnița	Orăşenesc Stadium	2,000
FC Nistru	Otaci	Călărăseuca Stadium	3,000
FC Olimpia	Bălți	Olimpia Bălți Stadium	5,000
Politehnica Chișinău	Chișinău	Dinamo Stadium (Chișinău)	2,692
FC Sheriff	Tiraspol	Sheriff Stadium	14,300
CS Tiligul-Tiras	Tiraspol	Stadionul Municipal	3,525
FC Tiraspol	Tiraspol	Sheriff Stadium	14,300
FC Zimbru	Chișinău	Zimbru Stadium	10,500

== Promotion and relegation ==
Due to the withdrawal of FC Rapid Ghidighici in mid-November 2007, no teams were relegated to Moldovan "A" Division. Promoted to Moldova's top-tier football were FC Academia UTM Chișinău.

== League table ==
Pos	Team	Pld	W	D	L	GF	GA	GD	Pts	Qualification or relegation
1	Sheriff Tiraspol (C)	30	25	3	2	61	15	+46	78	Qualification for the Champions League second qualifying round
2	Dacia Chișinău	30	20	3	7	47	17	+30	63	Qualification for the Europa League second qualifying round (Note: Dacia Chișinău qualified for the second qualifying round of the Europa League through league performance and them being a finalist in the 2008–09 Moldovan Cup.)
3	Iskra-Stal Rîbnița	30	14	10	6	28	15	+13	52	Qualification for the Europa League second qualifying round
4	Zimbru Chișinău	30	13	7	10	42	30	+12	46	Qualification for the Europa League first qualifying round (Note: Zimbru Chișinău were at first denied a license for competing in Europa League next year, so their spot should have been taken by 5th placed team Dinamo Bender. However, Zimbru appealed successfully and eventually were allowed to enter the Europa League.)
5	Dinamo Bender	30	11	9	10	42	45	−3	42	
6	Olimpia Bălți	30	11	7	12	30	32	−2	40	
7	Tiraspol	30	9	5	16	30	36	−6	32	
8	Nistru Otaci	30	8	6	16	30	43	−13	30	
9	CSCA-Rapid Chișinău	30	7	8	15	28	47	−19	29	
10	Tiligul-Tiras	30	7	4	19	24	60	−36	25	Folded (Note: Tiligul-Tiras folded on 6 June 2009 due to financial problems. As a consequence, Academia Chișinău were spared from relegation.)
11	Academia Chișinău	30	6	6	18	27	49	−22	24	
—	Politehnica Chișinău (R)	0	0	0	0	0	0	0	0	Relegation to Division "A" (Note: Withdrew from league prior to 1st round, reason unknown.)

Source: Moldovan Football Federation (in Romanian)
Rules for classification: 1st points; 2nd head-to-head points; 3rd head-to-head goal difference; 4th goal difference; 5th goals scored; 6th number of wins; 7th Fair play competition
(C) Champions; (R) Relegated

== Results ==
The schedule consists of three rounds. During the first two rounds, each team played each other once home and away for a total of 20 matches. The pairings of the third round were then set according to the standings after the first two rounds, giving every team a third game against each opponent for a total of 30 games per team.

=== First and second round ===
Home \ Away	ACA	CRC	DAC	DIN	ISK	NIS	OLI	SHE	TIL	TIR	ZIM
Academia Chișinău		0–2	0–2	2–2	0–0	1–0	0–2	0–1	2–1	2–3	1–5
CSCA-Rapid Chișinău	0–1		1–3	0–0	0–1	1–0	4–0	0–2	1–2	2–1	0–2
Dacia Chișinău	1–0	3–1		3–0	1–0	1–0	2–0	0–2	4–1	2–0	1–1
Dinamo Bender	1–1	2–0	1–3		2–2	2–1	1–2	0–2	2–2	4–2	2–1
Iskra-Stal Rîbnița	2–0	0–0	0–1	1–0		0–1	2–0	1–0	4–0	1–1	0–0
Nistru Otaci	3–2	4–1	2–1	3–3	0–0		0–1	1–3	1–3	3–2	0–1
Olimpia Bălți	3–1	1–1	0–0	1–2	1–1	0–0		1–2	2–0	0–0	1–0
Sheriff Tiraspol	1–0	6–2	2–0	1–2	2–0	2–0	1–0		3–0	2–1	1–1
Tiligul-Tiras	1–0	3–2	0–4	0–0	0–2	1–3	1–2	1–4		1–0	0–4
Tiraspol	3–0	3–2	0–1	2–0	0–1	2–0	1–2	1–2	1–2		0–1
Zimbru Chișinău	2–3	4–0	2–1	2–0	2–0	1–1	3–0	0–2	2–0	1–1	

Source: Moldovan Football Federation (in Romanian)
Legend: Blue = home team win; Yellow = draw; Red = away team win.

=== Third round ===
Key numbers for pairing determination:

23rd round	24th round	25th round	26th round	27th round	28th round
1 - bye	1 - 2	2 - bye	1 - 4	3 - bye	1 - 6
2 - 11	8 - 6	3 - 1	2 - 3	4 - 2	2 - 5
3 - 10	9 - 5	4 - 11	9 - 7	5 - 1	3 - 4
4 - 9	10 - 4	5 - 10	10 - 6	6 - 11	10 - 8
5 - 8	11 - 3	6 - 9	11 - 5	7 - 10	11 - 7
6 - 7	bye - 7	7 - 8	bye - 8	8 - 9	bye - 9

29th round	30th round	31st round	32nd round	33rd round
4 - bye	1 - 8	5 - bye	1 - 10	6 - bye
5 - 3	2 - 7	6 - 4	2 - 9	7 - 5
6 - 2	3 - 6	7 - 3	3 - 8	8 - 4
7 - 1	4 - 5	8 - 2	4 - 7	9 - 3
8 - 11	11 - 9	9 - 1	5 - 6	10 - 2
9 - 10	bye - 10	10 - 11	bye - 11	11 - 1

Home \ Away	ACA	CRC	DAC	DIN	ISK	NIS	OLI	SHE	TIL	TIR	ZIM
Academia Chișinău						0–0	0–4	3–3		0–1	3–0
CSCA-Rapid Chișinău	1–0		0–0	1–1	0–0				0–0		
Dacia Chișinău	2–0					3–0	2–0			1–0	3–0
Dinamo Bender	2–2		2–1		0–3	2–1				1–0	
Iskra-Stal Rîbnița	0–3		1–0			2–0	0–0			1–0	
Nistru Otaci		1–2					1–3	0–3	2–0		2–0
Olimpia Bălți		1–2		1–2				0–1	1–1		1–0
Sheriff Tiraspol		4–1	1–0	2–0	0–0				2–0		
Tiligul-Tiras	1–0		0–1	0–5	1–2					0–1	
Tiraspol		2–1				0–0	1–0	0–2			1–1
Zimbru Chișinău		0–0		3–1	0–1			0–2	3–2		

Source: Moldovan Football Federation (in Romanian)
Legend: Blue = home team win; Yellow = draw; Red = away team win.

== Top goalscorers ==
Pos	Player	Scored for	Goals
1	(Moldova) Oleg Andronic	Zimbru Chișinău	14
?
