= 2012–13 FC Sheriff Tiraspol season =

Sheriff Tiraspol
2012–13 season
- Manager: Vitali Rashkevich
- Stadium: Sheriff Stadium
- Divizia Naţională: 1st
- Moldovan Cup: Semi-final
- Super Cup: Runners-up
- Champions League: Third qualifying round
- Europa League: Play-off round
- Top goalscorer: League: Alexandru Pașcenco (9); All: Alexandru Pașcenco (9)
Home colours	Away colours

The 2012–13 season was FC Sheriff Tiraspol's 16th season, and their 14th in the Divizia Naţională, the top-flight of Moldovan football.

== Squad ==
As of match played 31 May 2013

No.	Name	Nationality	Position	Date of birth (Age)	Signed from	Signed in	Contract ends	Apps.	Goals
Goalkeepers
1	Alexandru Zveaghințev	(Moldova)	GK	26 July 1987 (aged 25)	Tiraspol	2011		30	0
12	Dmitri Stajila	(Moldova)	GK	2 August 1991 (aged 21)	Trainee	2007			
25	Denis Makogonenco	(Moldova)	GK	20 February 1996 (aged 17)	Trainee	2012			
Defenders
3	Alexandr Bolsacov	(Moldova)	DF	19 November 1994 (aged 18)	Trainee	2013		1	0
4	Artiom Rozgoniuc	(Moldova)	DF	1 October 1995 (aged 17)	Trainee	2013		1	0
15	Marcel Metoua	(Ivory Coast)	DF	15 November 1988 (aged 24)	Banat Zrenjanin	2011		74	6
17	Alexandru Scripcenco	(Moldova)	DF	13 January 1991 (aged 22)	Tiraspol	2013			
18	Artyom Khachaturov	(Moldova)	DF	18 June 1992 (aged 20)	Trainee	2009			
20	Artur Apostolov	(Moldova)	DF	15 June 1994 (aged 18)	Trainee	2013		1	0
21	Tadej Apatič	(Slovenia)	DF	7 July 1987 (aged 25)	Domžale	2012		18	1
23	Krzysztof Król	(Poland)	DF	6 February 1987 (aged 26)	Podbeskidzie Bielsko-Biała	2013		10	0
26	Miral Samardžić	(Slovenia)	DF	17 February 1987 (aged 26)	Maribor	2010			
27	Valeriu Macrițchii	(Moldova)	DF	13 February 1996 (aged 17)	Trainee	2013		3	0
77	Nicolae Vâlcov	(Moldova)	DF		Trainee	2013		1	0
Midfielders
7	Alexandru Onica	(Moldova)	MF	29 July 1984 (aged 28)	Vorskla Poltava	2012		53	0
8	Serghei Gheorghiev	(Moldova)	MF	20 October 1991 (aged 21)	Trainee	2008			
13	Saša Marjanović	(Serbia)	MF	13 November 1987 (aged 25)	Jagodina	2012		21	1
14	Wilfried Balima	(Burkina Faso)	MF	20 March 1985 (aged 28)	US Ouagadougou	2005			
16	Vadim Paireli	(Moldova)	MF	8 November 1995 (aged 17)	Trainee	2013		2	0
19	Vadim Oleinic	(Moldova)	MF	10 October 1992 (aged 20)	Trainee	2013		1	0
24	Veaceslav Lisa	(Moldova)	MF	24 May 1993 (aged 20)	Trainee	2011		13	3
28	Vadim Rață	(Moldova)	MF	5 May 1993 (aged 20)	Trainee	2010		53	2
33	Valentin Bîrdan	(Moldova)	MF	13 May 1995 (aged 18)	Trainee	2013		1	0
88	Marko Stanojević	(Serbia)	MF	22 June 1988 (aged 24)	Rad	2012		38	4
89	Alexandru Pașcenco	(Moldova)	MF	28 May 1989 (aged 24)	Rapid Ghidighici	2012			
Forwards
9	Marko Markovski	(Serbia)	FW	26 May 1986 (aged 27)	Xanthi	2013		11	8
10	Aleksandar Pešić	(Serbia)	FW	21 May 1992 (aged 21)	OFI Crete	2010		70	26
22	Iurie Mîrza	(Moldova)	FW	5 March 1993 (aged 20)	Gagauziya-Oguzsport	2012		5	2
73	Andrei Macrițchii	(Moldova)	FW	13 February 1996 (aged 17)	Trainee	2013		1	0
90	Luvannor	(Brazil)	FW	19 May 1990 (aged 23)	Morrinhos	2011		60	18
99	Eugeniu Rebenja	(Moldova)	FW	5 March 1995 (aged 18)	Trainee	2013		2	0
Players away on loan
20	Igor Dima	(Moldova)	FW	11 February 1993 (aged 20)	Trainee	2010		9	2
23	Tomislav Pajović	(Serbia)	DF	15 March 1986 (aged 27)	Rad	2012		9	1
30	Nail Zamaliyev	(Russia)	MF	9 July 1989 (aged 23)	Dynamo Moscow	2010		51	8
33	Igor Poiarcov	(Moldova)	MF	27 June 1994 (aged 18)	Trainee	2012		5	0
77	Anatol Cheptine	(Moldova)	MF	20 May 1990 (aged 23)	Tiraspol	2011		56	11
	Djibril Paye	(Guinea)	DF	26 February 1990 (aged 23)		2008			
Left during the season
3	João Pereira	(Portugal)	DF	10 May 1990 (aged 23)	Beira-Mar	2012		15	0
9	Darwin Ríos	(Bolivia)	FW	25 April 1991 (aged 22)	Guabirá	2012		16	3
11	Alexandru Dedov	(Moldova)	MF	26 July 1989 (aged 23)	Dacia Chișinău	2011		40	4
16	Leonel Morales	(Bolivia)	DF	2 September 1988 (aged 24)	loan from Universitario de Sucre	2011		19	0
17	Florent Rouamba	(Burkina Faso)	MF	31 December 1986 (aged 26)	ASFA Yennenga	2006			
22	Ciprian Tănasă	(Romania)	FW	2 February 1981 (aged 32)	Alki Larnaca	2012		13	1
25	Vladislav Stoyanov	(Bulgaria)	GK	8 June 1987 (aged 25)	Chernomorets Burgas	2010			
31	Sergiu Dadu	(Moldova)	FW	23 January 1981 (aged 32)		2012			
73	Stanislav Ivanov	(Moldova)	MF	7 October 1980 (aged 32)	Lokomotiv Moscow	2012		14	1
99	Boris Alfaro	(Panama)	FW	29 October 1988 (aged 24)	Universitario	2012		2	0

=== Out on loan ===
Note: Flags indicate national team as defined under FIFA eligibility rules; some limited exceptions apply. Players may hold more than one non-FIFA nationality.

No.	Pos.	Nation	Player
20	MF	MDA	Igor Dima (at Tiraspol)
23	DF	SRB	Tomislav Pajović (at Partizan)
30	MF	RUS	Nail Zamaliyev (at Torpedo Moscow)

No.	Pos.	Nation	Player
33	MF	MDA	Igor Poiarcov
77	MF	MDA	Anatol Cheptine (at Tiraspol)

== Transfers ==
=== In ===
Date	Position	Nationality	Name	From	Fee	Ref.
14 June 2012	DF	(Slovenia)	Tadej Apatič	Domžale	Undisclosed	
15 June 2012	MF	(Serbia)	Saša Marjanović	Jagodina	Undisclosed	
15 June 2012	MF	(Serbia)	Marko Stanojević	Rad	Undisclosed	
21 June 2012	FW	(Panama)	Boris Alfaro	Universitario	Undisclosed	
23 June 2012	MF	(Moldova)	Alexandru Pașcenco	Rapid Ghidighici	Undisclosed	
2 July 2012	DF	(Serbia)	Tomislav Pajović	Rad	Undisclosed	
19 July 2012	MF	(Moldova)	Stanislav Ivanov	Lokomotiv Moscow	Undisclosed	
11 August 2012	FW	(Moldova)	Sergiu Dadu		Free	
2 September 2012	FW	(Romania)	Ciprian Tănasă	Alki Larnaca	Undisclosed	
20 February 2013	DF	(Poland)	Krzysztof Król	Podbeskidzie Bielsko-Biała	Undisclosed	
20 February 2013	FW	(Serbia)	Marko Markovski	Skoda Xanthi	Undisclosed	

=== Out ===
Date	Position	Nationality	Name	To	Fee	Ref.
9 July 2012	FW	(Slovenia)	Dalibor Volaš	Mordovia Saransk	Undisclosed	
Summer 2012	FW	(Brazil)	Jhonatan	Tractor Sazi	Undisclosed	
11 January 2013	GK	(Bulgaria)	Vladislav Stoyanov	Ludogorets Razgrad	Undisclosed	
31 January 2013	DF	(Portugal)	João Pereira	Nordsjælland	Undisclosed	
Winter 2013	MF	(Portugal)	José Coelho	Freamunde	Undisclosed	
Winter 2013	FW	(Panama)	Boris Alfaro	San Francisco	Undisclosed	

=== Loans in ===
Date from	Position	Nationality	Name	From	Date to	Ref.
Winter 2012	FW	(Bolivia)	Darwin Ríos	Guabirá	17 August 2012	
Winter 2012	DF	(Bolivia)	Leonel Morales	Universitario de Sucre	10 December 2012	

=== Loans out ===
Date from	Position	Nationality	Name	To	Date to	Ref.
Summer 2009	DF	(Guinea)	Djibril Paye	Tiraspol	18 June 2013	
Summer 2012	DF	(Moldova)	Alexandru Scripcenco	Tiraspol	7 March 2013	
5 September 2012	MF	(Russia)	Nail Zamaliyev	Torpedo Moscow	End of Season	
7 February 2013	DF	(Serbia)	Tomislav Pajović	Partizan	End of Season	
Winter 2013	MF	(Moldova)	Anatol Cheptine	Tiraspol	End of Season	
Winter 2013	MF	(Moldova)	Igor Dima	Tiraspol	End of Season	

=== Released ===
Date	Position	Nationality	Name	Joined	Date
10 December 2012	MF	(Burkina Faso)	Florent Rouamba	Charlton Athletic	28 March 2013
7 February 2013	MF	(Moldova)	Stanislav Ivanov	Tiraspol	
7 February 2013	FW	(Moldova)	Sergiu Dadu		
14 March 2013	FW	(Romania)	Ciprian Tănasă	Mioveni	
1 April 2013	MF	(Moldova)	Alexandru Dedov	Academia Chișinău	

== Competitions ==
=== Moldovan Super Cup ===
8 July 2012	Milsami Orhei	0–0 (a.e.t.) (6–5 p)	Sheriff Tiraspol	Tiraspol
20:00 EET (UTC+2)	Stoleru (yellow card) 33'; Wellington (yellow card) 63'; Traoré (yellow card) 74'; Gheți (yellow card) 81'; Negai (yellow card) 82'	Report	Stanojević (yellow card) 70'	Stadium: Sheriff Stadium; Attendance: 3,000; Referee: Veaceslav Banari
	Penalties
	Gheți (penalty scored); Wellington (penalty scored); Simão (penalty missed); Guilherme (penalty scored); Sosnovschi (penalty scored); Furdui (penalty scored); Gârlă (penalty scored)		(penalty scored) Metoua; (penalty scored) Stanojević; (penalty scored) Haceaturov; (penalty scored) Samardžić; (penalty missed) Stoyanov; (penalty scored) Zamaliyev; (penalty missed) Ríos

=== Divizia Națională ===
==== Results summary ====
Overall								Home						Away					
Pld	W	D	L	GF	GA	GD	Pts	W	D	L	GF	GA	GD	W	D	L	GF	GA	GD
0	0	0	0	0	0	0	0	0	0	0	0	0	0	0	0	0	0	0	0

Last updated: 22 May 2012.
Source: See Results

==== Results ====
13 July 2012 1	Sheriff Tiraspol	5–0	Costuleni	Tiraspol
19:00 EEST (UTC+3)	Stanojević 13'; Apatič 30'; Ríos (yellow card) 37'; Zamaliyev 70'; Dima 89'; Samardžić 90+3' (pen.)	Report	Nurudeen (yellow card) 27'; P.Kouassi (yellow card) 80'	Stadium: Sheriff Stadium; Attendance: 900; Referee: Andrei Ceban

21 July 2012 2	Academia Chișinău	1–4	Sheriff Tiraspol	Ghidighici
18:00 EEST (UTC+3)	Livandovschi 64' (pen.); Caraulan (yellow card) 90+1'	Report	Cheptine 24'; Dima 28'; Pașcenco (yellow card) 43'; Zveaghințev (yellow card) 63'; Pešić (yellow card) 79' (goal) 90+2'; Balima 90+3'	Stadium: Ghidighici Stadium; Attendance: 400; Referee: Victor Bugenko

29 July 2012 3	Sheriff Tiraspol	1–0	Milsami Orhei	Tiraspol
19:00 EEST (UTC+3)	Samardžić 5' (pen.) (yellow card) 14'; Pașcenco (yellow card) 19'; Stanojević (yellow card) 90+2'; Stoyanov (yellow card) 90+3'	Report	Espinoza (yellow card) 14'; Rassulov (yellow card) 55'; Gârlă (yellow card) 67'	Stadium: Sheriff Stadium; Attendance: 1,000; Referee: Dmitiri Muntean

4 August 2012 4	Sheriff Tiraspol	1–0	Iskra-Stal	Tiraspol
19:00 EEST (UTC+3)	Pașcenco 55'; Pajović (yellow card) 68'	Report		Stadium: Sheriff Stadium; Attendance: 500; Referee: Alexandr Tean

11 August 2012 5	Zimbru Chișinău	0–1	Sheriff Tiraspol	Chișinău
20:00 EEST (UTC+3)	Tumbasević (yellow card) 26'; Barakhoyev (yellow card) 42'	Report	Metoua 9'; Zveaghințev (yellow card) 90'	Stadium: Zimbru Stadium; Attendance: 3,500; Referee: Serghei Derenov

19 August 2012 6	Sheriff Tiraspol	0–0	Rapid Ghidighici	Tiraspol
19:00 EEST (UTC+3)	Onica (yellow card) 35'; Samardžić (yellow card) 73'	Report	Clonin; Goufan (yellow card) 66' (red card) 78'	Stadium: Sheriff Stadium; Attendance: 700; Referee: Vadim Dedeniov

26 August 2012 7	Olimpia Bălți	0–1	Sheriff Tiraspol	Bălți
17:00 EEST (UTC+3)	Camara (yellow card) 66'	Report	Pajović (yellow card) 32'; Dadu 67' (yellow card) 80'	Stadium: Stadionul Orășenesc; Attendance: 1,500; Referee: Gabriel Tupicico

2 September 2012 8	Sheriff Tiraspol	2–1	Nistru Otaci	Tiraspol
18:00 EEST (UTC+3)	Luvannor 10'; Pașcenco 19'; Zveaghințev (red card) 62'	Report	Burghiu (yellow card) 90+1'	Stadium: Sheriff Stadium; Attendance: 500; Referee: Andrei Ceban

15 September 2012 9	Tiraspol	1–2	Sheriff Tiraspol	Tiraspol
19:00 EEST (UTC+3)	Costrov (yellow card) 22'; Feshchenko (yellow card) 28'; Zarichnyuk 37'	Report	Luvannor 47', 58'; Ivanov (yellow card) 87'; Metoua (yellow card) 90+1'	Stadium: Sheriff Stadium; Attendance: 500; Referee: Victor Bugenko

22 September 2012 10	Sheriff Tiraspol	3–0	Speranța Crihana Veche	Tiraspol
19:00 EEST (UTC+3)	Luvannor 28'; Pașcenco 66', 75'; Khachaturov (yellow card) 68'	Report	N.Ciorbadji (yellow card) 77'	Stadium: Sheriff Stadium; Attendance: 500; Referee: Ruslan Muntean

29 September 2012 11	Dacia Chișinău	0–1	Sheriff Tiraspol	Chișinău
19:00 EEST (UTC+3)	Dimovski (yellow card) 64'; Ilescu (yellow card) 80'; Cojocari (yellow card) 82'	Report	Ivanov 65'; Onica (yellow card) 75'	Stadium: Zimbru Stadium; Attendance: 3,000; Referee: Serghei Derenov

6 October 2012 12	Costuleni	0–3	Sheriff Tiraspol	Orhei
15:00 EEST (UTC+3)	Pîslă (yellow card) 17'; I.Mostovei (yellow card) 39'; S.Mocanu (yellow card) 45+1'	Report	Dadu 4', 51' (yellow card) 28'; Samardžić (yellow card) 23'; Ivanov (yellow card) 75'; Pașcenco 61'	Stadium: CSR Orhei; Attendance: 200; Referee: Victor Bugenko

21 October 2012 13	Sheriff Tiraspol	3–0	Academia Chișinău	Tiraspol
18:30 EEST (UTC+3)	Metoua 21'; Onica (yellow card) 61'; Balima 68'; Luvannor (yellow card) 72'; Pașcenco 89'	Report	Vremea (yellow card) 31'; Gînsari (yellow card) 33'	Stadium: Sheriff Stadium; Attendance: 1,200; Referee: Gabriel Tupicico

27 October 2012 14	Milsami Orhei	3–0	Sheriff Tiraspol	Orhei
15:00 EET (UTC+2)	Gârlă 37'; Guilherme 55'; Gheți (yellow card) 60'; Boghiu 81'	Report	Samardžić (yellow card) 8'; Khachaturov (yellow card) 42'; Rouamba (yellow card) 51'	Stadium: CSR Orhei; Attendance: 1,000; Referee: Serghei Derenov

4 November 2012 15	Iskra-Stal	2–2	Sheriff Tiraspol	Tiraspol
13:00 EET (UTC+2)	Antoniuc (yellow card) 23' (goal) 87'; E.Buză (yellow card) 26'; Leucă (yellow card) 30' (goal) 81'	Report	Rouamba 48'; Onica (yellow card) 71'; Pešić 75'; Khachaturov (yellow card) 77'	Stadium: Sheriff Tiraspol Training Ground; Attendance: 500; Referee: Dmitiri Muntean

10 November 2012 16	Sheriff Tiraspol	1–0	Zimbru Chișinău	Tiraspol
18:00 EET (UTC+2)	Pașcenco 22'; Rouamba (yellow card) 77' (red card) 90+2'; Samardžić (yellow card) 90+3'	Report	Tumbasević (yellow card) 18'; Anton (yellow card) 70'; Bălașa (yellow card) 70'	Stadium: Sheriff Stadium; Attendance: 2,000; Referee: Gabriel Tupicico

18 November 2012 17	Rapid Ghidighici	0–2	Sheriff Tiraspol	Ghidighici
13:00 EET (UTC+2)	Maxim (yellow card) 28'; D.Bacal (yellow card) 32'	Report	Samardžić 27' (pen.); Pešić 49'; Luvannor (yellow card) 71'	Stadium: Ghidighici Stadium; Attendance: 200; Referee: Serghei Derenov

24 November 2012 18	Sheriff Tiraspol	3–0	Olimpia Bălți	Tiraspol
15:00 EET (UTC+2)	Samardžić (yellow card) 36'; Balima 41'; Pešić 51'; Pașcenco 84'	Report	Pogreban (yellow card) 38'; Ogada (yellow card) 43'	Stadium: Sheriff Stadium; Attendance: 1,500; Referee: Vladislav Ivancenco

28 November 2012 19	Nistru Otaci	1–7	Sheriff Tiraspol	Călărășeuca
13:00 EET (UTC+2)	V.Ukrainets 86'	Report	Khachaturov (yellow card) 15'; Pešić 16'; Dedov 33', 34'; Stanojević 61'; Balima 77'; Samardžić (yellow card) 78'; Tănasă 79'; Rață 85'	Stadium: Călărășeuca Stadium; Attendance: 300; Referee: Victor Bugenko

2 December 2012 20	Sheriff Tiraspol	2–0	Tiraspol	Tiraspol
15:00 EET (UTC+2)	Stanojević 19'; Pașcenco 34'	Report		Stadium: Sheriff Stadium; Attendance: 1,000; Referee: Alexandr Tean

3 March 2013 21	Speranța Crihana Veche	0–2	Sheriff Tiraspol	Vadul lui Vodă
13:00 EET (UTC+2)		Report	Zveaghințev (yellow card) 3'; Dedov 45'; Markovski 72'; Khachaturov (red card) 74'	Stadium: Stadionul CPSM; Attendance: 300; Referee: Alexandr Tean

9 March 2013 22	Sheriff Tiraspol	0–0	Dacia Chișinău	Tiraspol
17:00 EET (UTC+2)	Onica (yellow card) 50'; Gheorghiev (yellow card) 90'	Report	Grosu (yellow card) 43'; Orbu (yellow card) 47'; Mihaliov (yellow card) 89'	Stadium: Krytyj futbolnyj Manesh; Attendance: 2,500; Referee: Serghei Derenov

15 March 2013 23	Sheriff Tiraspol	2–1	Speranța Crihana Veche	Tiraspol
17:00 EET (UTC+2)	Luvannor 31'; Markovski 37'; Khachaturov (yellow card) 43'	Report	Crîcimari 43' (pen.); E.Celeadnic (yellow card) 80'; E.Gorceac (yellow card) 90'	Stadium: Krytyj futbolnyj Manesh; Attendance: 800; Referee: Ion Arnaut

31 March 2013 24	Sheriff Tiraspol	0–0	Dacia Chișinău	Tiraspol
17:00 EEST (UTC+3)	Pașcenco (yellow card) 17'	Report	Guira (yellow card) 9'; Ilescu (yellow card) 58'	Stadium: Sheriff Stadium; Attendance: 3,500; Referee: Andrei Ceban

6 April 2013 25	Tiraspol	2–1	Sheriff Tiraspol	Tiraspol
18:00 EEST (UTC+3)	Popovici 22'; Bulat (yellow card) 68'; Cheptine 90+3'	Report	Król (yellow card) 46'; Hauși 88' (o.g.)	Stadium: Sheriff Stadium; Attendance: 1,000; Referee: Ruslan Muntean

12 April 2013 26	Sheriff Tiraspol	1–2	Milsami Orhei	Tiraspol
18:00 EEST (UTC+3)	Samardžić (yellow card) 29'; Metoua (yellow card) 54'; Balima 55'	Report	Iavorschi (yellow card) 4'; N.Mohammed (yellow card) 12'; Furdui 15'; Rhaili (yellow card) 59'; Boghiu 60'; A.Negai (yellow card) 77'	Stadium: Sheriff Stadium; Attendance: 700; Referee: Vladislav Ivancenco

21 April 2013 27	Rapid Ghidighici	0–2	Sheriff Tiraspol	Ghidighici
16:00 EEST (UTC+3)	Plămădeală (yellow card) 37'; Maxim (yellow card) 40'; Franțuz (yellow card) 90+2'	Report	Gheorghiev 12'; Samardžić 41' (pen.); Pașcenco (yellow card) 49'; Onica (yellow card) 85'	Stadium: Ghidighici Stadium; Attendance: 400; Referee: Victor Gheciu

27 April 2013 28	Sheriff Tiraspol	1–1	Academia Chișinău	Tiraspol
18:00 EEST (UTC+3)	Pešić (yellow card) 22'; Rață (yellow card) 57'; Stanojević (yellow card) 61'; Markovski 77'; Onica (yellow card) 86'	Report	Ciupercă 16' (yellow card) 16' (yellow-red card) 90+1'; Cheltuială (yellow card) 22' (yellow-red card) 68'; Pătraș (yellow card) 27'; Vremea (yellow card) 52'; Avram (yellow card) 90+3'	Stadium: Sheriff Stadium; Attendance: 500; Referee: Gabriel Tupicico

3 May 2013 29	Iskra-Stal	0–3	Sheriff Tiraspol	Rîbnița
17:00 EEST (UTC+3)		Report		Stadium: Stadionul Orășenesc
Note: Match awarded 3–0 by the Moldovan Football Federation.

11 May 2013 30	Sheriff Tiraspol	3–0	Olimpia Bălți	Tiraspol
19:00 EEST (UTC+3)	Stanojević 14'; Pešić 56'; Lisa 87'	Report		Stadium: Sheriff Stadium; Attendance: 300; Referee: Ruslan Muntean

16 May 2013 31	Zimbru Chișinău	0–2	Sheriff Tiraspol	Chișinău
19:00 EEST (UTC+3)	Slivca (yellow card) 24'	Report	Markovski 4'; Lisa 25'; Macrițchii (yellow card) 46' (yellow-red card) 59'; Onica (yellow card) 69'	Stadium: Zimbru Stadium; Attendance: 4,000; Referee: Serghei Derenov

21 May 2013 32	Sheriff Tiraspol	2–1	Costuleni	Tiraspol
18:00 EEST (UTC+3)	Metoua 17' (pen.) (yellow card) 27'; Onica (yellow card) 44'; Markovski 90+3'	Report	Cemîrtan 3'; Bugneac (yellow card) 17'; A.Solodchi (yellow card) 43'	Stadium: Sheriff Stadium; Attendance: 1,000; Referee: Vladislav Ivancenco

31 May 2013 33	Nistru Otaci	1–2	Sheriff Tiraspol	Călărășeuca
18:00 EEST (UTC+3)	S.Radu 73'	Report	Mîrza 8'; Paireli (yellow card) 60'; Lisa 61'	Stadium: Călărășeuca Stadium; Attendance: 100; Referee: Gheorghe Malinovschii

==== League table ====
Pos	Team	Pld	W	D	L	GF	GA	GD	Pts	Qualification or relegation
1	Sheriff Tiraspol (C)	33	25	5	3	65	17	+48	80	Qualification for the Champions League second qualifying round
2	Dacia Chişinău	33	18	12	3	47	19	+28	66	Qualification for the Europa League first qualifying round (Note: Since Tiraspol won the 2012–13 Moldovan Cup, 4th-placed team, Milsami Orhei, also qualified for UEFA Europa League.)
3	FC Tiraspol	33	18	10	5	54	20	+34	64	Qualification for the Europa League first qualifying round
4	Milsami Orhei	33	18	4	11	48	30	+18	58	Qualification for the Europa League first qualifying round
5	Rapid Ghidighici	33	15	4	14	36	38	−2	49	

Source: Football Association of Moldova
Rules for classification: 1st points; 2nd head-to-head points; 3rd head-to-head goal difference; 4th head-to-head goals scored; 5th goal difference; 6th number of goals scored; 7th Fair Play competition
(C) Champions

=== Moldovan Cup ===
31 October 2012 Third Round	Rapid Ghidighici	0–1 (a.e.t.)	Sheriff Tiraspol	Ghidighici
13:00 EET (UTC+2)	Luca (yellow card) 14'; Doroș (yellow card) 77'; Jardan (yellow card) 94'	Report	Gheorghiev (yellow card) 73'; Khachaturov 93'	Stadium: Ghidighici Stadium

16 April 2013 Quarterfinal	Sheriff Tiraspol	7–0	Nistru Otaci	Tiraspol
17:00 EEST (UTC+3)	Markovski 29', 33', 65'; Luvannor 35'; Gheorghiev 44'; Marjanović 81'; Pešić 90+2'	Report	Kucherenko (yellow card) 70'	Stadium: Sheriff Stadium; Attendance: 300; Referee: Gheorghe Malinovschii

7 May 2013 Semifinal	Tiraspol	2–1 (a.e.t.)	Sheriff Tiraspol	Tiraspol
18:00 EEST (UTC+3)	Popovici 5'; S.Lyubchak (yellow card) 31'; Novicov (yellow card) 91'; Hauși 98'	Report	Gheorghiev (yellow card) 42'; Balima 64'; Onica (yellow card) 84'	Stadium: Sheriff Stadium; Attendance: 600; Referee: Vladislav Ivancenco

=== UEFA Champions League ===
==== Qualifying rounds ====
17 July 2012 Second Qualifying Round 1st leg	Ulisses (Armenia)	0–1	(Moldova) Sheriff Tiraspol	Yerevan, Armenia
18:00 EEST (UTC+3)	Sahakyan (yellow card) 33'	Report	Gheorghiev 60'; Samardžić (yellow card) 90+1'	Stadium: Republican Stadium; Attendance: 3,000; Referee: Tamás Bognár (Hungary)

24 July 2012 Second Qualifying Round 2nd leg	Sheriff Tiraspol (Moldova)	1–0 (2–0 agg.)	(Armenia) Ulisses	Tiraspol, Moldova
20:00 EEST (UTC+3)	Gheorghiev (yellow card) 55'; Samardžić 66' (pen.); Rouamba (yellow card) 70'	Report	Sahakyan (yellow card) 31'; Grigoryan (yellow card) 62'	Stadium: Sheriff Stadium; Attendance: 6,755; Referee: Vlado Glodjović (Serbia)

1 August 2012 Third Qualifying Round 1st leg	Sheriff Tiraspol (Moldova)	0–1	(Croatia) Dinamo Zagreb	Tiraspol, Moldova
20:00 EEST (UTC+3)	Marjanović (yellow card) 39'	Report	Bećiraj 14'; Vida (yellow card) 39'; Čop (yellow card) 66'; Pokrivač (yellow card) 80'	Stadium: Sheriff Stadium; Attendance: 8,315; Referee: Lee Probert (England)

8 August 2012 Third Qualifying Round 2nd leg	Dinamo Zagreb (Croatia)	4–0 (5–0 agg.)	(Moldova) Sheriff Tiraspol	Zagreb, Croatia
21:45 EEST (UTC+3)	Vida 16'; Bećiraj 34'; Peko (yellow card) 67'; Čop 78'; Ibáñez 87'	Report	Pajović (yellow card) 49'	Stadium: Stadion Maksimir; Attendance: 16,063; Referee: Leontios Trattou (Cyprus)

=== UEFA Europa League ===
==== Qualifying rounds ====
23 August 2012 Playoff Round 1st leg	Sheriff Tiraspol (Moldova)	1–2	(France) Marseille	Tiraspol, Moldova
20:00 EEST (UTC+3)	Pajović 27'; Samardžić (yellow card) 73'; Morales (yellow card) 90+3'	Report	J.Ayew 18', 53' (yellow card) 48'	Stadium: Sheriff Stadium; Attendance: 11,770; Referee: Sascha Kever (Switzerland)

30 August 2012 Playoff Round 2nd leg	Marseille (France)	0–0 (2–1 agg.)	(Moldova) Sheriff Tiraspol	Marseille, France
21:30 EEST (UTC+3)	Mango (yellow card) 30'; J.Ayew (yellow card) 62'	Report	Morales (yellow card) 68'; Balima (yellow card) 72'; Onica (yellow card) 83'	Stadium: Stade Vélodrome; Attendance: 9,583; Referee: Kristinn Jakobsson (Iceland)

== Squad statistics ==
As of Match played 31 May 2013

=== Appearances and goals ===
No.	Pos	Nat	Player	Total		Divizia Națională		Moldovan Cup		Super Cup		Champions League		Europa League	
No.	Pos	Nat	Player	Apps	Goals	Apps	Goals	Apps	Goals	Apps	Goals	Apps	Goals	Apps	Goals
1	GK	(Moldova) MDA	Alexandru Zveaghințev	14	0	12+1	0	1	0	0	0	0	0	0	0
3	DF	(Moldova) MDA	Alexandr Bolsacov	1	0	1	0	0	0	0	0	0	0	0	0
4	DF	(Moldova) MDA	Artiom Rozgoniuc	1	0	0+1	0	0	0	0	0	0	0	0	0
7	MF	(Moldova) MDA	Alexandru Onica	38	0	26+2	0	3	0	1	0	4	0	2	0
8	MF	(Moldova) MDA	Serghei Gheorghiev	29	3	10+11	1	2+1	1	1	0	4	1	0	0
9	FW	(Serbia) SRB	Marko Markovski	11	8	6+4	5	1	3	0	0	0	0	0	0
10	FW	(Serbia) SRB	Aleksandar Pešić	33	7	17+7	6	1+2	1	1	0	3	0	2	0
12	GK	(Moldova) MDA	Dmitri Stajila	13	0	10+1	0	2	0	0	0	0	0	0	0
13	MF	(Serbia) SRB	Saša Marjanović	21	1	3+11	0	1+1	1	1	0	4	0	0	0
14	MF	(Burkina Faso) BFA	Wilfried Balima	35	6	21+6	5	3	1	0	0	0+3	0	2	0
15	DF	(Ivory Coast) CIV	Marcel Metoua	38	3	30+1	3	0	0	1	0	4	0	2	0
16	MF	(Moldova) MDA	Vadim Paireli	2	0	2	0	0	0	0	0	0	0	0	0
17	DF	(Moldova) MDA	Alexandru Scripcenco	7	0	5	0	1+1	0	0	0	0	0	0	0
18	DF	(Moldova) MDA	Artyom Khachaturov	27	1	23	0	3	1	0+1	0	0	0	0	0
19	MF	(Moldova) MDA	Vadim Oleinic	1	0	1	0	0	0	0	0	0	0	0	0
20	DF	(Moldova) MDA	Artur Apostolov	1	0	1	0	0	0	0	0	0	0	0	0
21	DF	(Slovenia) SLO	Tadej Apatič	18	1	12	1	1	0	1	0	4	0	0	0
22	FW	(Moldova) MDA	Iurie Mîrza	4	1	1+2	1	0+1	0	0	0	0	0	0	0
23	DF	(Poland) POL	Krzysztof Król	10	0	6+3	0	1	0	0	0	0	0	0	0
24	MF	(Moldova) MDA	Veaceslav Lisa	8	3	3+4	3	0+1	0	0	0	0	0	0	0
26	DF	(Slovenia) SLO	Miral Samardžić	31	5	23	4	1	0	1	0	4	1	2	0
27	DF	(Moldova) MDA	Valeriu Macrițchii	3	0	3	0	0	0	0	0	0	0	0	0
28	MF	(Moldova) MDA	Vadim Rață	13	1	2+8	1	0+3	0	0	0	0	0	0	0
33	MF	(Moldova) MDA	Valentin Bîrdan	1	0	0+1	0	0	0	0	0	0	0	0	0
73	FW	(Moldova) MDA	Andrei Macrițchii	1	0	0+1	0	0	0	0	0	0	0	0	0
77	DF	(Moldova) MDA	Nicolae Vâlcov	1	0	0+1	0	0	0	0	0	0	0	0	0
88	MF	(Serbia) SRB	Marko Stanojević	38	4	23+5	4	3	0	1	0	4	0	2	0
89	MF	(Moldova) MDA	Alexandru Pașcenco	34	9	24+5	9	2+1	0	0+1	0	0	0	0+1	0
90	FW	(Brazil) BRA	Luvannor	30	6	19+5	5	3	1	0	0	1	0	0+2	0
99	FW	(Moldova) MDA	Eugeniu Rebenja	2	0	0+1	0	0+1	0	0	0	0	0	0	0
Players away on loan :
20	MF	(Moldova) MDA	Igor Dima	5	2	2+1	2	0	0	0	0	0+2	0	0	0
23	DF	(Serbia) SRB	Tomislav Pajović	9	1	4+1	0	0	0	0	0	0+2	0	2	1
30	MF	(Russia) RUS	Nail Zamaliyev	4	1	1+1	1	0	0	0+1	0	0+1	0	0	0
33	MF	(Moldova) MDA	Igor Poiarcov	2	0	0+2	0	0	0	0	0	0	0	0	0
77	MF	(Moldova) MDA	Anatol Cheptine	6	1	2+2	1	0	0	1	0	0+1	0	0	0
Players who left Sheriff Tiraspol during the season:
3	DF	(Portugal) POR	João Pereira	6	0	1	0	0	0	1	0	4	0	0	0
9	FW	(Bolivia) BOL	Darwin Ríos	3	0	1	0	0	0	0+1	0	1	0	0	0
11	MF	(Moldova) MDA	Alexandru Dedov	25	3	13+6	3	1	0	0	0	3	0	2	0
16	DF	(Bolivia) BOL	Leonel Morales	7	0	5	0	0	0	0	0	0	0	2	0
17	MF	(Burkina Faso) BFA	Florent Rouamba	16	1	7+5	1	1	0	0	0	0+1	0	2	0
22	FW	(Romania) ROU	Ciprian Tănasă	13	1	4+8	1	1	0	0	0	0	0	0	0
25	GK	(Bulgaria) BUL	Vladislav Stoyanov	17	0	10	0	0	0	1	0	4	0	2	0
31	FW	(Moldova) MDA	Sergiu Dadu	13	3	8+3	3	1	0	0	0	0	0	0+1	0
73	MF	(Moldova) MDA	Stanislav Ivanov	14	1	8+2	1	0	0	0	0	0+2	0	0+2	0
99	FW	(Panama) PAN	Boris Alfaro	2	0	2	0	0	0	0	0	0	0	0	0

=== Goal scorers ===
Place	Position	Nation	Number	Name	Divizia Națională	Moldovan Cup	Super Cup	Champions League	Europa League	Total
1	MF	(Moldova)	89	Alexandru Pașcenco	9	0	0	0	0	9
2	FW	(Serbia)	9	Marko Markovski	5	3	0	0	0	8
3	FW	(Serbia)	10	Aleksandar Pešić	6	1	0	0	0	7
4	FW	(Brazil)	90	Luvannor	5	1	0	0	0	6
4	MF	(Burkina Faso)	14	Wilfried Balima	5	1	0	0	0	6
6	DF	(Slovenia)	26	Miral Samardžić	4	0	0	1	0	5
7	MF	(Serbia)	88	Marko Stanojević	4	0	0	0	0	4
8	DF	(Ivory Coast)	15	Marcel Metoua	3	0	0	0	0	3
8	MF	(Moldova)	11	Alexandru Dedov	3	0	0	0	0	3
8	MF	(Moldova)	24	Veaceslav Lisa	3	0	0	0	0	3
8	FW	(Moldova)	31	Sergiu Dadu	3	0	0	0	0	3
8	MF	(Moldova)	8	Serghei Gheorghiev	1	1	0	1	0	3
13	MF	(Moldova)	20	Igor Dima	2	0	0	0	0	2
14	DF	(Slovenia)	21	Tadej Apatič	1	0	0	0	0	1
14	MF	(Burkina Faso)	17	Florent Rouamba	1	0	0	0	0	1
14	MF	(Moldova)	28	Vadim Rață	1	0	0	0	0	1
14	MF	(Russia)	30	Nail Zamaliyev	1	0	0	0	0	1
14	MF	(Moldova)	73	Stanislav Ivanov	1	0	0	0	0	1
14	MF	(Moldova)	77	Anatol Cheptine	1	0	0	0	0	1
14	FW	(Romania)	22	Ciprian Tănasă	1	0	0	0	0	1
14	FW	(Moldova)	22	Iurie Mîrza	1	0	0	0	0	1
14	DF	(Armenia)	18	Artyom Khachaturov	0	1	0	0	0	1
14	MF	(Serbia)	13	Saša Marjanović	0	1	0	0	0	1
14	DF	(Serbia)	23	Tomislav Pajović	0	0	0	0	1	1
				TOTALS	66	9	0	2	1	78

=== Disciplinary record ===
Number	Nation	Position	Name	Divizia Națională		Moldovan Cup		Super Cup		Champions League		Europa League		Total	
Number	Nation	Position	Name	Yellow card	Red card	Yellow card	Red card	Yellow card	Red card	Yellow card	Red card	Yellow card	Red card	Yellow card	Red card
1	(Moldova)	GK	Alexandru Zveaghințev	3	1	0	0	0	0	0	0	0	0	3	1
7	(Moldova)	MF	Alexandru Onica	9	0	1	0	0	0	0	0	1	0	11	0
8	(Moldova)	MF	Serghei Gheorghiev	1	0	2	0	0	0	1	0	0	0	4	0
10	(Serbia)	FW	Aleksandar Pešić	2	0	0	0	0	0	0	0	0	0	2	0
13	(Serbia)	MF	Saša Marjanović	0	0	0	0	0	0	1	0	0	0	1	0
14	(Burkina Faso)	MF	Wilfried Balima	0	0	0	0	0	0	0	0	1	0	1	0
15	(Ivory Coast)	DF	Marcel Metoua	3	0	0	0	0	0	0	0	0	0	3	0
16	(Moldova)	MF	Vadim Paireli	1	0	0	0	0	0	0	0	0	0	1	0
18	(Armenia)	DF	Artyom Khachaturov	5	1	0	0	0	0	0	0	0	0	5	1
23	(Poland)	DF	Krzysztof Król	1	0	0	0	0	0	0	0	0	0	1	0
26	(Slovenia)	DF	Miral Samardžić	1	0	0	0	0	0	1	0	1	0	3	0
27	(Moldova)	DF	Valeriu Macrițchii	2	1	0	0	0	0	0	0	0	0	2	1
28	(Moldova)	MF	Vadim Rață	1	0	0	0	0	0	0	0	0	0	1	0
88	(Serbia)	MF	Marko Stanojević	2	0	0	0	1	0	0	0	0	0	3	0
89	(Moldova)	MF	Alexandru Pașcenco	4	0	0	0	0	0	0	0	0	0	4	0
91	(Brazil)	FW	Henrique Luvannor	2	0	0	0	0	0	0	0	0	0	2	0
Players away from Sheriff Tiraspol on loan:
23	(Serbia)	DF	Tomislav Pajović	2	0	0	0	0	0	1	0	0	0	3	0
Players who left Sheriff Tiraspol during the season:
9	(Bolivia)	FW	Darwin Ríos	1	0	0	0	0	0	0	0	0	0	1	0
16	(Bolivia)	DF	Leonel Morales	0	0	0	0	0	0	0	0	2	0	2	0
17	(Burkina Faso)	MF	Florent Rouamba	2	1	0	0	0	0	1	0	0	0	3	1
25	(Bulgaria)	GK	Vladislav Stoyanov	1	0	0	0	0	0	0	0	0	0	1	0
31	(Moldova)	FW	Sergiu Dadu	2	0	0	0	0	0	0	0	0	0	2	0
73	(Moldova)	MF	Stanislav Ivanov	2	0	0	0	0	0	0	0	0	0	2	0
			TOTALS	47	4	3	0	1	0	5	0	5	0	50	4
