= 2012 Moldovan Super Cup =

Supercupa Moldovei
Milsami Orhei	Sheriff Tiraspol
0	0
- Milsami Orhei won 6–5 on penalties
- Date: 8 July 2012
- Venue: Sheriff Stadium, Tiraspol
- Referee: Veaceslav Banari
- Attendance: 3,000

The 2012 Moldovan Super Cup was the sixth Moldovan Super Cup (Romanian: Supercupa Moldovei), an annual Moldovan football match played by the winner of the national football league (the National Division) and the winner of the national Cup. The match was played between Sheriff Tiraspol, champions of the 2011–12 National Division, and Milsami Orhei, winners of the 2011–12 Moldovan Cup. It was held at the Sheriff Stadium on 8 July 2012.

Milsami Orhei won 6–5 on penalties, after the match finished 0–0 after 90 minutes.

== Match ==
8 July 2012
19:00 EEST

Milsami Orhei	0–0	Sheriff Tiraspol
Penalties
Gheți (penalty scored); Wellington (penalty scored); Simão (penalty missed); Guilherme (penalty scored); Sosnovschi (penalty scored); Furdui (penalty scored); Gârlă (penalty scored)	6–5	(penalty scored) Metoua; (penalty scored) Stanojević; (penalty scored) Khachaturov; (penalty scored) Samardžić; (penalty missed) Stoyanov; (penalty scored) Zamaliyev; (penalty missed) Ríos

Sheriff Stadium, Tiraspol
Attendance: 3,000
Referee: Veaceslav Banari

Milsami	Sheriff

GK	12	(Moldova) Andrian Negai	(yellow card) 82'
DF	4	(Spain) Rafael Wellington	(yellow card) 63'
DF	5	(Moldova) Adrian Sosnovschi
DF	6	(Portugal) Bruno Simão
DF	16	(Moldova) Denis Rassulov		(substituted off) 62'
MF	7	(Romania) Valerian Gârlă
MF	10	(Chile) Fernando Espinoza		(substituted off) 86'
MF	14	(Ghana) Nurudeen Mohammed		(substituted off) 88'
MF	23	(Moldova) Marian Stoleru	(yellow card) 33'
FW	9	(Ivory Coast) Ousmane Traore	(yellow card) 74'
FW	11	(Moldova) Gheorghe Boghiu		(substituted off) 59'
Substitutes:
DF	19	(Moldova) Alexandru Stadiiciuc		(substituted on) 88'
MF	3	(Romania) Cornel Gheți	(yellow card) 81'	(substituted on) 62'
MF	8	(Moldova) Valentin Furdui		(substituted on) 86'
FW	27	(Malaysia) Guilherme de Paula		(substituted on) 59'
Manager:
(Moldova) Serghei Cleșcenco

GK	23	(Bulgaria) Vladislav Stoyanov
DF	3	(Portugal) João Pereira		(substituted off) 90+1'
DF	15	(Ivory Coast) Marcel Metoua
DF	21	(Slovenia) Tadej Apatič
DF	26	(Slovenia) Miral Samardžić
MF	7	(Moldova) Alexandru Onica
MF	8	(Moldova) Serghei Gheorghiev
MF	13	(Serbia) Saša Marjanović		(substituted off) 66'
MF	77	(Moldova) Anatol Cheptine		(substituted off) 72'
MF	88	(Serbia) Marko Stanojević	(yellow card) 70'
FW	10	(Serbia) Aleksandar Pešić		(substituted off) 78'
Substitutions:
DF	18	(Armenia) Artyom Khachaturov		(substituted on) 90+1'
MF	33	(Russia) Nail Zamaliyev		(substituted on) 66'
MF	89	(Moldova) Alexandru Pașcenco		(substituted on) 72'
FW	9	(Bolivia) Darwin Ríos		(substituted on) 78'
Manager:
(Serbia) Milan Milanović

Assistant referees:
Serghei Trofan
Sergiu Beșliu
Fourth official:
Victor Gheciu

Match rules

- 90 minutes.
- Penalty shoot-out if score is still level.
