= Moldovan Super Cup =

Association football super cup in Moldova

Super Cup
- Organiser(s): Moldovan Football Federation
- Founded: 2003; 23 years ago
- Region: Moldova
- Teams: 2
- Current champions: Sfîntul Gheorghe (1st title)
- Most championships: Sheriff Tiraspol (7 titles)
- Website: fmf.md

The Moldovan Super Cup (Romanian: Supercupa Moldovei) is the national annual football match contested between the champions of the previous Moldovan Liga season and the holders of the Moldovan Cup. Over the course of 24 years, this match has been held 12 times. Eight times it was cancelled cause the same team won both the championship and the cup, and four times the Moldovan Football Federation decided not to hold the match.

== Results ==
2003 Moldovan Super Cup

17 September 2003
19:00 EEST

Zimbru Chișinău (as Cup winners)	0 – 2	Sheriff Tiraspol (as League champions)
		Farias 22', 27' (pen.)

Sheriff Arena, Tiraspol
Attendance: 8,000
Referee: Tudor Cepoi

2004 Moldovan Super Cup

8 August 2004
20:00 EEST

Zimbru Chișinău (as Cup winners)	0 – 1	Sheriff Tiraspol (as League champions)
		Blanco 68'

Sheriff Arena, Tiraspol
Attendance: 5,000
Referee: Vitalie Onică

2005 Moldovan Super Cup

7 August 2005
20:00 EEST

Nistru Otaci (as Cup winners)	0 – 4	Sheriff Tiraspol (as League champions)
		Humenyuk 43', 55'; Epureanu 51'; Kuciuk 90+3'

Sheriff Arena, Tiraspol
Attendance: 3,000
Referee: Vlad Ivancenco

2006 Moldovan Super Cup Not Held. Sheriff Tiraspol won the Double.

2007 Moldovan Super Cup

27 June 2007
20:00 EEST

Sheriff Tiraspol (as League champions)	1 – 0	Zimbru Chișinău (as Cup winners)
Thiago 84'

Sheriff Arena, Tiraspol
Attendance: 12,500
Referee: Veaceslav Banari

2008 Moldovan Super Cup Not Held. Sheriff Tiraspol won the Double.

2009 Moldovan Super Cup Not Held. Sheriff Tiraspol won the Double.

2010 Moldovan Super Cup Not Held. Sheriff Tiraspol won the Double.

2011 Moldovan Super Cup

8 July 2011
19:00 EEST

Iskra-Stal (as Cup winners)	0 – 1	Dacia Chișinău (as League champions)
		Pavlov 12'

Sheriff small Arena, Tiraspol
Attendance: 1,500
Referee: Ghenadie Sidenco

2012 Moldovan Super Cup

8 July 2012
20:00 EEST

Milsami Orhei (as Cup winners)	0 – 0 6 – 5 (pen.)	Sheriff Tiraspol (as League champions)
Penalties: Gheți (penalty scored) Wellington (penalty scored) Simão (penalty missed) Guilherme (penalty scored) Sosnovschi (penalty scored) Furdui (penalty scored) Gârlă (penalty scored)		Penalties: (penalty scored) Metoua (penalty scored) Stanojević (penalty scored) Haceaturov (penalty scored) Samardžić (penalty missed) Stoyanov (penalty scored) Zamaliyev (penalty missed) Ríos

Sheriff Arena, Tiraspol
Attendance: 3,000
Referee: Veaceslav Banari

2013 Moldovan Super Cup

29 June 2013
20:00 EEST

Sheriff Tiraspol (as League champions)	2 – 0	Tiraspol (as Cup winners)
Isa 10'; Balima 59'

Sheriff Arena, Tiraspol
Attendance: 2,500
Referee: Serghei Derenov

2014 Moldovan Super Cup

27 June 2014
19:00 EEST

Zimbru Chișinău (as Cup winners)	1 – 1 4 – 3 (pen.)	Sheriff Tiraspol (as League champions)
Grosu 45+1' Penalties: Dedov (penalty missed) Erhan (penalty scored) Anton (penalty missed) Vremea (penalty scored) Pavlyuchek (penalty missed) Klimovich (penalty scored) Bogdan (penalty scored)		Gînsari 45' Penalties: (penalty scored) Isa (penalty missed) Paye (penalty missed) Samardžić (penalty missed) Metoua (penalty scored) Ricardinho (penalty scored) Benson (penalty missed) Luvannor

Sheriff Arena, Tiraspol
Attendance: 5,000
Referee: Gabriel Tupicica

2015 Moldovan Super Cup

25 June 2015
20:00 EEST

Sheriff Tiraspol (as Cup winners)	3 – 1	Milsami Orhei (as League champions)
Potiguar 3'; A. Macrițchii 9'; Cadú 34'		Bud 22' (pen.)

Sheriff Arena, Tiraspol
Attendance: 5,000
Referee: Petru Stoianov

2016 Moldovan Super Cup

10 August 2016
20:00 EEST

Sheriff Tiraspol (as League champions)	3 – 1	Zaria Bălți (as Cup winners)
Subotić 16', 82' (pen.); Rebenja 90'		Bugaiov 20'

Sheriff small Arena, Tiraspol
Attendance: 3,000
Referee: Petru Stoianov

2017 Moldovan Super Cup Not Held. Sheriff Tiraspol won the Double.

2018 Moldovan Super Cup Not Held.

2019 Moldovan Super Cup

10 March 2019
16:00 EET

Sheriff Tiraspol (as League champions)	0 – 0 4 – 5 (pen.)	Milsami Orhei (as Cup winners)
Penalties: Oancea (penalty scored) Pedersen (penalty scored) Tambe (penalty scored) Anton (penalty scored) Cristiano (penalty missed)		Penalties: (penalty scored) Bolohan (penalty scored) Crăciun (penalty scored) Onica (penalty scored) Andronic (penalty scored) Mîțu

Sheriff small Arena, Tiraspol
Attendance: 3,000
Referee: Alexandru Tean

2020 Moldovan Super Cup Not Held.

2021 Moldovan Super Cup

26 June 2021
20:00 EEST

Sfîntul Gheorghe (as Cup winners)	2 – 2 4 – 2 (pen.)	Sheriff Tiraspol (as League champions)
Sagna 55'; Litveacov 90+2' Penalties: Slivca (penalty scored) Litveacov (penalty scored) Sagna (penalty scored) Suvorov (penalty scored)		Bizjak 53' (pen.); Belousov 84' Penalties: (penalty scored) Radeljić (penalty missed) Petro (penalty missed) Dulanto (penalty scored) Bizjak

Bălți Stadium, Bălți
Attendance: 3,000
Referee: Petru Stoianov

2022 Moldovan Super Cup Not Held. Sheriff Tiraspol won the Double.

2023 Moldovan Super Cup Not Held. Sheriff Tiraspol won the Double.

2024 Moldovan Super Cup Not Held. Petrocub Hîncești won the Double.

2025 Moldovan Super Cup Not Held.

2026 Moldovan Super Cup Not Held.

== Performance by club ==
Club	Winners	Runners-up	Winning Years	Runners-up Years
Sheriff Tiraspol	7	4	2003, 2004, 2005, 2007, 2013, 2015, 2016	2012, 2014, 2019, 2021
Milsami Orhei	2	1	2012, 2019	2015
Zimbru Chișinău	1	3	2014	2003, 2004, 2007
Dacia Chișinău	1	—	2011	
Sfîntul Gheorghe	1	—	2021	
Nistru Otaci	—	1		2005
Iskra-Stal	—	1		2011
Tiraspol	—	1		2013
Zaria Bălți	—	1		2016

== Top goalscorers ==
Rank	Player	Team	Goals	Minutes played
1	(Brazil) Leandro Farias	Sheriff Tiraspol	2	85
1	(Switzerland) Danijel Subotić	Sheriff Tiraspol	2	88
1	(Ukraine) Oleh Humenyuk	Sheriff Tiraspol	2	152
4	19 players		1	—N/a
