= 2015 Moldovan Super Cup =

Supercupa Moldovei
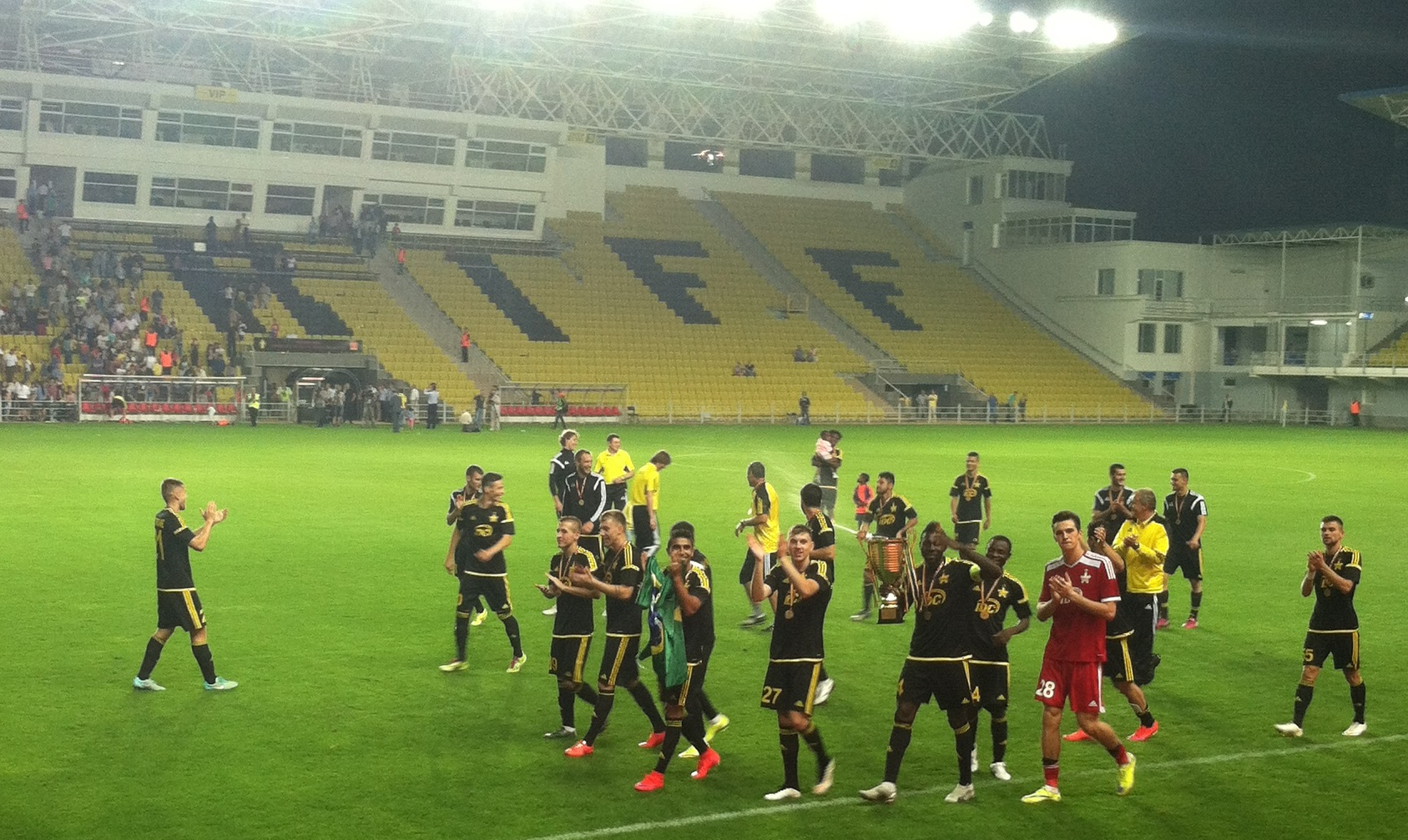
Sheriff Tiraspol	Milsami Orhei
3	1
- Date: 25 June 2015
- Venue: Sheriff Stadium, Tiraspol
- Referee: Piotr Stoianov
- Attendance: 5,000

The 2015 Moldovan Super Cup was the ninth Moldovan Super Cup (Romanian: Supercupa Moldovei), an annual Moldovan football match played by the winner of the national football league (the National Division) and the winner of the national Cup. The match was played between Milsami Orhei, champions of the 2014–15 National Division, and Sheriff Tiraspol, winners of the 2014–15 Moldovan Cup. It was held at the Sheriff Stadium on 25 June 2015.

Sheriff Tiraspol won the match 3–1.

== Match ==
25 June 2015
19:00 EEST

Sheriff Tiraspol	3–1	Milsami Orhei
Potiguar 4'; A. Macrițchii 9'; Cadú 34'		Bud 22' (pen.)

Sheriff Stadium, Tiraspol
Attendance: 5,000
Referee: Piotr Stoianov

Sheriff	Milsami

GK	28	(Moldova) Alexei Koșelev
DF	15	(Ivory Coast) Marcel Metoua
DF	18	(Moldova) Andrei Novicov	(substituted off) 76'
DF	21	(Moldova) Maxim Potîrniche	(substituted off) 83'
DF	55	(Bosnia and Herzegovina) Mateo Sušić
MF	6	(Croatia) Igor Jugović
MF	20	(Brazil) Cadú	(substituted off) 67'
MF	24	(Ghana) Seidu Yahaya
MF	27	(Moldova) Andrei Macrițchii
FW	11	(Brazil) Ricardinho
FW	93	(Brazil) Juninho Potiguar	(substituted off) 64'
Substitutes:
GK	25	(Moldova) Sergiu Juric
DF	19	(Moldova) Serghei Svinarenco	(substituted on) 76'
DF	22	(Bosnia and Herzegovina) Amer Dupovac
DF	33	(Moldova) Valeriu Macrițchii	(substituted on) 83'
MF	4	(Serbia) Mihajlo Cakić
MF	7	(Ukraine) Vyacheslav Sharpar	(substituted on) 67'
MF	8	(Moldova) Radu Gînsari
MF	10	(Croatia) Ivan Crnov	(substituted on) 64'
MF	14	(Burkina Faso) Wilfried Balima
FW	29	(Bulgaria) Ismail Isa
FW	93	(Moldova) Maxim Iurcu
Manager:
(Moldova) Lilian Popescu

GK	12	(Moldova) Andrian Negai
DF	4	(Moldova) Iulian Erhan
DF	5	(Moldova) Petru Racu
DF	6	(Nigeria) Ovye Monday	(yellow card) 23'
DF	15	(Moldova) Denis Rassulov		(substituted off) 46'
MF	7	(Ukraine) Yevhen Zarichnyuk		(substituted off) 46'
MF	8	(Moldova) Artur Pătraș
MF	14	(Croatia) Karlo Belak
MF	27	(Moldova) Andrei Cojocari	(yellow card) 58'	(substituted off) 70'
MF	87	(Moldova) Alexandru Suvorov		(substituted off) 19'
FW	10	(Romania) Romeo Surdu
Substitutions:
GK	21	(Moldova) Gheorghe Bantîș
DF	2	(Morocco) Adil Rhaili
DF	23	(Moldova) Vadim Bolohan
MF	3	(Romania) Cornel Gheți		(substituted on) 46'
MF	9	(Moldova) Alexandru Dulghier
MF	16	(Moldova) Alexandru Antoniuc		(substituted on) 70'
MF	17	(Moldova) Eugen Slivca
MF	22	(Moldova) Gheorghe Andronic		(substituted on) 46'
FW	26	(Romania) Cristian Bud		(substituted on) 19'
Manager:
(Moldova) Iurie Osipenco

Assistant referees:
Vitalie Gorbatov
Tudor Bologa
Additional assistant referees:
Alexandru Tean
Viktor Bugenko
Fourth official:
Filip Alexanchin

Match rules

- 90 minutes.
- Penalty shoot-out if score is still level.
- Eleven named substitutes, of which up to four may be used.
