= João Vitor (footballer, born 1983) =

Brazilian footballer

Personal information
- Full name: João Vitor da Silva
- Date of birth: 15 March 1983 (age 43)
- Place of birth: Jardim Alegre, Brazil
- Height: 1.82 m (6 ft 0 in)
- Position: Central defender

Team information
- Current team: Brusque

Youth career
- 1999–2000: XV de Piracicaba

Senior career*
Years	Team	Apps	(Gls)
2001	XV de Piracicaba		
2002	Santo André		
2003–2007	Paraná		
2008	Gama		
2009	Anápolis		
2010	Rio Branco	1	(0)
2011–	Brusque		
- * Club domestic league appearances and goals

João Vitor da Silva or simply João Vitor (born 15 March 1983), is a Brazilian central defender for Brusque Futebol Clube.

He played for Paraná in the Brazilian Série A for 5 seasons, from 2003 to 2007.

== Contract ==
- 11 April 2007 to 10 April 2008
