= Constantin Bogdan =

Moldovan footballer

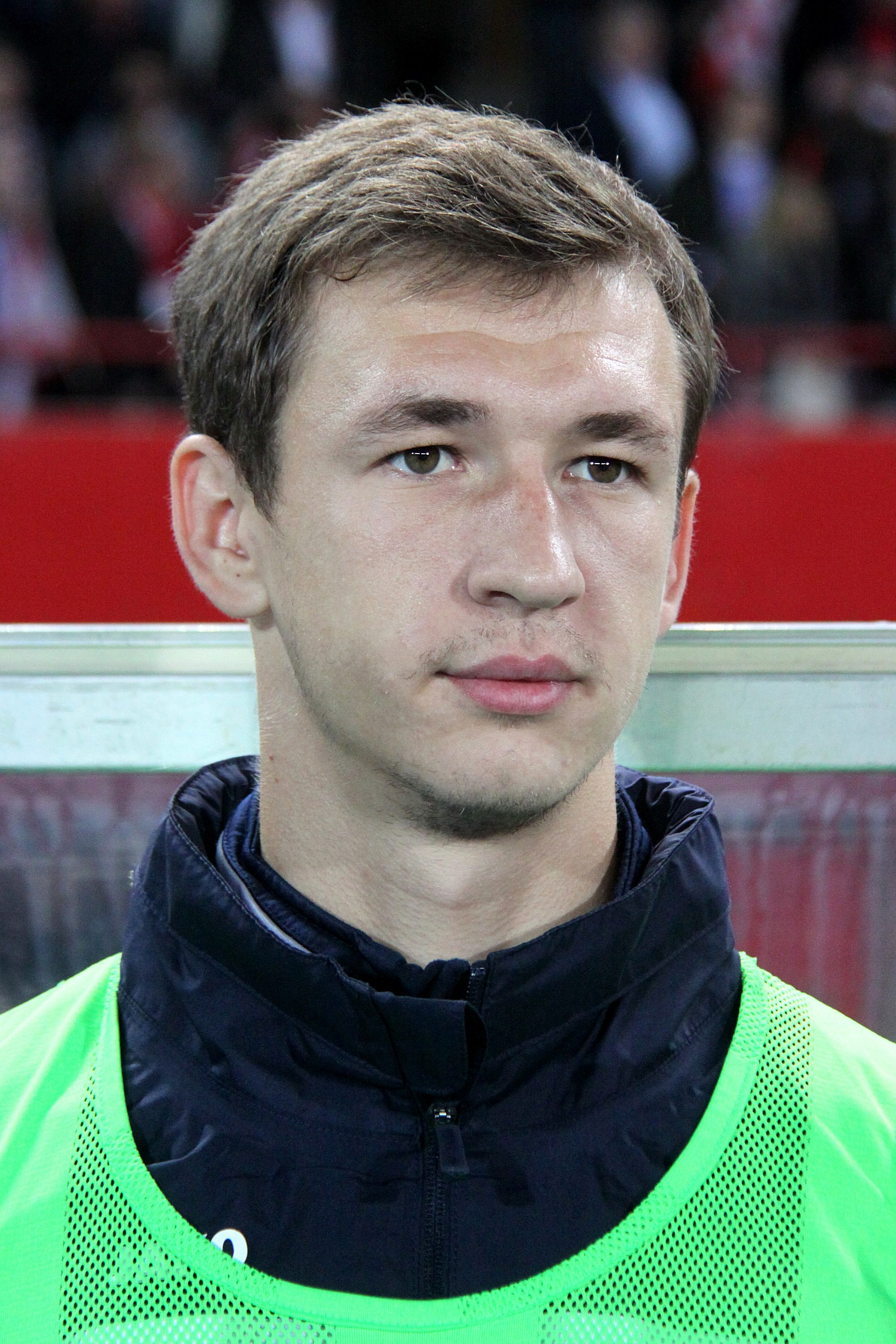
- Bogdan with Moldova in 2015

Personal information
- Full name: Constantin Bogdan
- Date of birth: 29 December 1993 (age 32)
- Place of birth: Chișinău, Moldova
- Height: 1.84 m (6 ft 1/2 in)
- Position: Defender

Youth career
- Zimbru Chișinău

Senior career*
Years	Team	Apps	(Gls)
2012−2013	Iskra-Stal	5	(0)
2013–2014	Zimbru Chișinău	24	(4)
2014–2016	Yenisey Krasnoyarsk	6	(0)
2015	→ Zimbru Chișinău (loan)	3	(0)
2016	Sheriff Tiraspol	0	(0)
2016–2017	Spartaks Jūrmala	13	(2)
2017–2019	Milsami Orhei	55	(7)
2020	Petrocub	0	(0)
2020–2021	Milsami Orhei	24	(3)
Total		130	(16)

International career
	Moldova U17	2	(0)
2012–2014	Moldova U21	19	(2)
2018	Moldova	1	(0)
- * Club domestic league appearances and goals

Constantin Bogdan (born 29 December 1993) is a Moldovan former professional footballer who played as a defender.

== Club career ==
On 4 January 2016, Bogdan left FC Yenisey Krasnoyarsk by mutual consent.

In July 2021, he retired at the age of 27.

== International career ==
Bogdan was called up to the senior Moldova squad for a UEFA Euro 2016 qualifier against Montenegro in September 2015. He made his senior international debut on 26 February 2018 in a friendly against Saudi Arabia.

== Honours ==
Zimbru Chișinău

- Moldovan Cup (1): 2013–14
- Moldovan Super Cup (1): 2014
