= Alexandru Vremea =

Moldovan professional footballer (born 1991)

Personal information
- Date of birth: 3 November 1991 (age 35)
- Place of birth: Suruceni, Moldova
- Height: 1.80 m (5 ft 11 in)
- Position: Midfielder

Youth career
- –2009: Sfântul Gheorghe

Senior career*
Years	Team	Apps	(Gls)
2009–2011	Sfântul Gheorghe	64	(2)
2012–2014	Academia Chișinău	72	(2)
2014–2016	Zimbru Chișinău	53	(3)
2016–2017	Academia Chișinău	32	(4)
2017	Politehnica Iași	1	(0)
2018	Petrocub Hîncești	22	(0)
2019	Foresta Suceava		
2019–2021	Sfântul Gheorghe	11	(0)
2021	Zimbru Chișinău	28	(0)
2022	Dacia Buiucani		

International career^{‡}
	Moldova U19	3	(0)
2011–2012	Moldova U21	4	(0)
2014–2018	Moldova	5	(0)
- * Club domestic league appearances and goals as of 11 December 2021 ‡ National team caps and goals as of 26 February 2018

Alexandru Vremea (born 3 November 1991) is a Moldovan professional footballer who plays as a midfielder.

== Club career ==
On 16 January 2018, Vremea signed for Petrocub Hîncești. After one season with the club, he signed for Liga III club Foresta Suceava on 1 February 2019.

On 3 August 2019, he returned to Moldova, signing for his youth club Sfântul Gheorghe. On 8 January 2021, he left Sfântul Gheorghe after playing for the club for one and a half years.

On 19 March 2021, Vremea signed a one-year contract with Zimbru Chișinău, returning to the club he played for between 2014 and 2016.

== International career ==
He made his debut for the Moldova national team on 7 June 2014 in a friendly against Cameroon.

== Career statistics ==
As of match played 26 May 2021

Appearances and goals by club, season and competition
Club	Season	League			National Cup		Europe		Other		Total	
Club	Season	Division	Apps	Goals	Apps	Goals	Apps	Goals	Apps	Goals	Apps	Goals
Sfântul Gheorghe	2009–10	Divizia Națională	30	2	0	0	—		—		30	2
Sfântul Gheorghe	2010–11	Divizia Națională	34	0	0	0	—		—		34	0
Sfântul Gheorghe	Total		64	2	0	0	—		—		64	2
Academica Chișinău	2011–12	Divizia Națională	27	0	0	0	—		—		27	0
Academica Chișinău	2012–13	Divizia Națională	27	2	0	0	—		—		27	2
Academica Chișinău	2013–14	Divizia Națională	18	0	0	0	—		—		18	0
Academica Chișinău	Total		72	2	0	0	—		—		72	2
Zimbru Chișinău	2013–14	Divizia Națională	12	0	3	0	—		—		15	0
Zimbru Chișinău	2014–15	Divizia Națională	25	1	1	0	8 (Note: Appearances in the Europa League)	0	1 (Note: Appearance in the Supercupa Moldovei)	0	35	1
Zimbru Chișinău	2015–16	Divizia Națională	16	2	0	0	—		—		16	2
Zimbru Chișinău	Total		53	3	4	0	8	0	1	0	66	3
Academica Chișinău	2015–16	Divizia Națională	10	0	1	0	—		—		11	0
Academica Chișinău	2016–17	Divizia Națională	22	4	0	0	—		—		22	4
Academica Chișinău	Total		32	4	1	0	—		—		33	4
Politehnica Iași	2017–18	Liga I	1	0	1	0	—		—		2	0
Petrocub Hîncești	2018	Divizia Națională	22	0	4	0	2	0	—		28	0
Sfântul Gheorghe	2019	Divizia Națională	4	0	1	0	—		—		5	0
Sfântul Gheorghe	2020–21	Divizia Națională	7	0	2	0	0	0	—		9	0
Sfântul Gheorghe	Total		11	0	3	0	0	0	—		14	0
Zimbru Chișinău	2020–21	Divizia Națională	10	0	0	0	—		—		10	0
Career total			265	11	13	0	10	0	1	0	289	11

== Honours ==
Zimbru Chișinău

- Moldovan Cup: 2013–14
- Moldovan Super Cup: 2014
