= Ciprian Tănasă =

Romanian footballer

Personal information
- Full name: Ciprian Ion Tănasă
- Date of birth: 2 February 1981 (age 45)
- Place of birth: Fălticeni, Romania
- Height: 1.77 m (5 ft 10 in)
- Position: Striker

Team information
- Current team: Vedița Colonești

Youth career
- CSS Fălticeni
- Nicolae Dobrin Football Academy

Senior career*
Years	Team	Apps	(Gls)
1999–2007	Argeş Piteşti	165	(39)
2000–2001	→ Râmnicu Vâlcea (loan)	11	(1)
2007–2009	FC U Craiova	22	(4)
2008–2009	→ Politehnica Iaşi (loan)	14	(1)
2009–2011	Metalurh Donetsk	52	(14)
2011	Mioveni	14	(3)
2012	Alki Larnaca	15	(5)
2012–2013	Sheriff Tiraspol	12	(1)
2013	Mioveni	12	(3)
2014	Râmnicu Vâlcea	3	(0)
2014–2015	Unirea Slobozia	2	(1)
2015	Atletic Bradu	4	(1)
2016–2017	SCM Pitești	16	(4)
2017–	Vedița Colonești	36	(29)
Total		372	(105)

International career^{‡}
2001–2002	Romania U-21	6	(0)
- * Club domestic league appearances and goals as of 16 February 2018 ‡ National team caps and goals as of 16 February 2018

Ciprian Ion Tănasă (born 2 February 1981 in Fălticeni, Suceava) is a Romanian footballer who plays for Liga IV side Vedița Colonești.
