= Fernando Espinoza (Chilean footballer) =

Chilean footballer (born 1991)

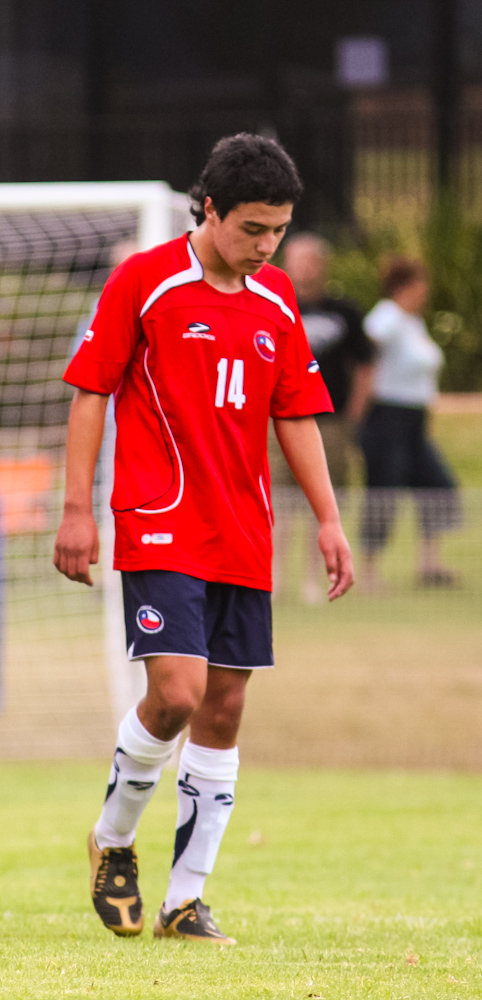

Personal information
- Full name: Fernando Hernán Espinoza Cárcamo
- Date of birth: 16 May 1991 (age 35)
- Place of birth: Talcahuano, Chile
- Height: 1.73 m (5 ft 8 in)
- Position: Midfielder

Youth career
- Huachipato

Senior career*
Years	Team	Apps	(Gls)
2010–2011	Huachipato	5	(0)
2011–2013	Milsami-Ursidos	20	(0)
2013–2014	Huachipato	2	(0)
2014–2015	Unión San Felipe	13	(1)
Total		40	(1)

International career
2009	Chile U18		
- * Club domestic league appearances and goals

Fernando Hernán Espinoza Cárcamo (born 16 May 1991) is a Chilean former footballer who played as midfielder.

== Career ==
Espinoza started his career playing at youth level for his hometown club CD Huachipato. He joined the club in 2006, and during his time at their youth academy was regarded as one of their most promising players. After making five league appearances for Huachipato, he signed for Moldovan National Division club FC Milsami-Ursidos in 2011. After two seasons in Moldova, he returned to Huachipato in 2013. The following season, he played by Union San Felipe by a year, days after the termination of his contract, his football career would be truncated due to a serious traffic accident which survives, but because of the gravity of its fractures, you will not be able to play more football.
