= Alexandru Zveaghințev =

Moldovan footballer

Personal information
- Full name: Alexandru Zveaghințev
- Date of birth: 26 July 1987 (age 39)
- Place of birth: Tiraspol, Moldova
- Height: 1.85 m (6 ft 1 in)
- Position: Goalkeeper

Team information
- Current team: FC Dinamo-Auto Tiraspol
- Number: 1

Senior career*
Years	Team	Apps	(Gls)
2006–2008	FC Tiligul-Tiras Tiraspol	13	(0)
2008–2011	FC Tiraspol	33	(0)
2011–2014	FC Sheriff Tiraspol	28	(0)
2015–	FC Dinamo-Auto Tiraspol	30	(0)
- * Club domestic league appearances and goals

Alexandru Zveaghințev (Russian: Александр Звягинцев, romanized: Aleksandr Zvyagintsev; born 26 July 1987) is a Moldovan goalkeeper who currently is playing for FC Dinamo-Auto Tiraspol.
