= Anatol Cheptine =

Moldovan footballer

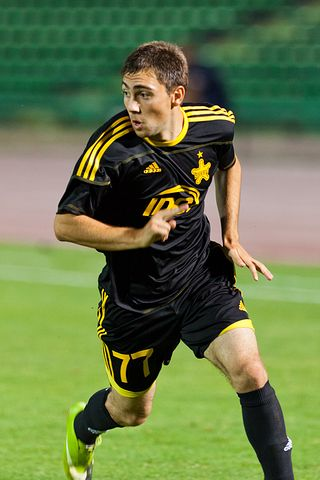
- Cheptine with Sheriff Tiraspol in 2012

Personal information
- Full name: Anatol Cheptine
- Date of birth: 20 May 1990 (age 36)
- Place of birth: Tiraspol, Moldova
- Height: 1.75 m (5 ft 9 in)
- Position: Midfielder

Team information
- Current team: MFK Ružomberok
- Number: 7

Senior career*
Years	Team	Apps	(Gls)
2007	Sheriff Tiraspol 2	4	(1)
2007–2011	Tiraspol	108	(11)
2011–2013	Sheriff Tiraspol	38	(11)
2013	→ Tiraspol (loan)	10	(1)
2013–2015	Zimbru Chișinău	33	(6)
2015	Academia Chișinău	10	(3)
2015	Ružomberok	8	(0)
2015	→ Dolný Kubín (loan)	8	(2)
2016–2019	Dinamo-Auto Tiraspol	43	(1)

International career^{‡}
	Moldova U17	5	(0)
	Moldova U19	9	(1)
2010–2012	Moldova U21	6	(1)
2011–	Moldova	12	(0)
- * Club domestic league appearances and goals as of 24 October 2014 ‡ National team caps and goals as of 21 July 2015

Anatol Cheptine (born 20 May 1990) is a Moldovan footballer who played as a midfielder for Fortuna Liga club MFK Ružomberok. He also played for Zimbru Chișinău in the Divizia Naţională and the Moldova national football team. He most recently played for Dinamo-Auto Tiraspol.

== Club career ==
=== FC Sheriff ===
In 2007, he signed for local Moldovan club FC Sheriff however he failed to make an appearance instead representing the reserve team where he made 4 appearances scoring 1 goal.

=== FC Tiraspol ===
In late 2007 he moved to rival club FC Tiraspol where he featured prominently over several years.

=== Return to FC Sheriff ===
In 2011, he made his return to FC Sheriff and managed 4 goals in 10 games in his first season.

== International career ==
On 29 March 2011 he made his debut for the Moldova national football team in a UEFA Euro 2012 qualifying match against Sweden.

== Honours ==
Sheriff Tiraspol

- Divizia Națională: 2011–12

FC Tiraspol

- Moldovan Cup: 2012–13

Zimbru Chișinău

- Moldovan Cup: 2013–14
- Moldovan Super Cup: 2014
