= Rafael Wellington =

Spanish footballer (born 1985)

Personal information
- Full name: Rafael Wellington Pérez
- Date of birth: 27 April 1985 (age 41)
- Place of birth: Córdoba, Spain
- Height: 1.84 m (6 ft 0 in)
- Position: Left back

Youth career
- Real Madrid

Senior career*
Years	Team	Apps	(Gls)
2004–2005	Real Madrid C		
2005–2006	Mallorca B		
2006–2007	Villanovense	13	(0)
2007–2008	Conquense	0	(0)
2008	Manchego		
2008–2009	Villanueva	18	(0)
2009–2010	Motril	45	(2)
2010–2011	Toledo		
2011–2012	Burgos		
2012–2013	Milsami	42	(3)
2013	Zimbru Chișinău	12	(0)
2014	PTT Rayong	16	(1)
2015–2016	Chiangmai		
2016	Biu Chun Glory Sky	14	(2)
2017	Atlético Espeleño	13	(0)
2017–2018	Recambios Colón	16	(0)
2018	Castellonense	17	(0)
2018–2019	Recambios Colón	28	(3)
2019–2020	Soneja	17	(0)
2020	Torrent	5	(2)
2020	Almussafes CF	5	(1)
2021–2022	CDF Base L'Eliana	34	(1)
2022	UD Canals	5	(0)
2022–2023	Manises	22	(1)
- * Club domestic league appearances and goals

Rafael Wellington Pérez (born 27 April 1985), known as Rafael Wellington or Rafa Wellington, is a Spanish former professional footballer who played as a left back.

== Honours ==
Milsami Orhei

- Moldovan Cup (1): 2011–2012
- Moldovan Super Cup (1): 2012
