= Leandro Farias =

Brazilian footballer

Personal information
- Date of birth: October 18, 1983 (age 43)
- Place of birth: Porto Alegre, Brazil
- Height: 1.75 m (5 ft 9 in)
- Position: Striker

Team information
- Current team: Pelotas

Youth career
- 1997–2003: Avaí

Senior career*
Years	Team	Apps	(Gls)
2003	Avaí	5	(0)
2003–2006	FC Sheriff	34	(13)
2007	Avaí	30	(15)
2007–2010	Metropolitano	5	(0)
2009	→ Mogi Mirim (loan)	2	(0)
2009	→ Chapecoense (loan)		
2009	→ Criciúma (loan)		
2011	Brusque	8	(1)
2011	América-RN	1	(0)
2012	Chapecoense		
2012–	Pelotas		
- * Club domestic league appearances and goals

Leandro Farias (born October 18, 1983), sometimes known as just Leandro or Leandrinho is a footballer who plays as a striker for Esporte Clube Pelotas.
