= Igor Dima =

Moldovan footballer

Personal information
- Date of birth: 11 February 1993 (age 33)
- Place of birth: Tiraspol, Moldova
- Height: 1.73 m (5 ft 8 in)
- Position: Forward

Youth career
- Sheriff-2 Tiraspol

Senior career*
Years	Team	Apps	(Gls)
2010–2016	Sheriff Tiraspol	7	(2)
2011–2013	→ Sheriff-2 Tiraspol	16	(11)
2013–2014	→ Tiraspol (loan)	10	(0)
2014–2015	→ Saxan (loan)	19	(1)
2015–2016	→ Speranța Nisporeni (loan)	17	(0)
2016–2017	Speranța Nisporeni	9	(0)
2017–2018	Petrocub Hîncești	17	(4)
2018	Sfântul Gheorghe	5	(0)

International career^{‡}
2010–2011	Moldova U19	8	(1)
2012–2014	Moldova U21	10	(5)
- * Club domestic league appearances and goals as of 6 April 2021 ‡ National team caps and goals as of 6 April 2021

Igor Dima (born 11 February 1993) is a Moldovan footballer who plays as a forward. He most recently played for Sfântul Gheorghe Suruceni.
