= Gheorghe Boghiu =

Moldovan footballer

Personal information
- Full name: Gheorghe Boghiu
- Date of birth: 26 October 1981 (age 45)
- Place of birth: Năvîrneț, Făleşti district, Moldavian SSR
- Height: 1.81 m (5 ft 11 1/2 in)
- Position: Forward

Senior career*
Years	Team	Apps	(Gls)
1998–2006	Olimpia Bălţi		
2006	Salyut-Energia Belgorod	18	(0)
2006	Avangard Kursk	7	(0)
2006–2007	Oțelul Galați	13	(1)
2008	Esil Bogatyr	14	(1)
2009	Chita	34	(5)
2010	Nasaf Qarshi	0	(0)
2010–2011	Milsami	33	(26)
2011–2012	AZAL	27	(5)
2012–2014	Milsami	50	(29)
2014–2015	Tiraspol	24	(10)
2015–2017	Zaria Bălți	54	(16)
Total		222	(80)

International career^{‡}
2011–2015	Moldova	6	(1)
- * Club domestic league appearances and goals as of 16 June 2015 ‡ National team caps and goals as of 16 June 2015

Gheorghe Boghiu (born 26 October 1981) is a retired Moldovan football forward.

Boghiu played for FC Olimpia Bălţi before moving to Russian First Division side FC Avangard Kursk in 2006. He transferred to Romanian side Oțelul Galați in January 2007. and returned to the Russian First Division to play for FC Chita during 2009.

In June 2014 Boghiu signed a one-year contract with Tiraspol.

== Club statistics (incomplete) ==
As of 4 December 2012

Club performance			League		Cup		League Cup		Continental		Total	
Season	Club	League	Apps	Goals	Apps	Goals	Apps	Goals	Apps	Goals	Apps	Goals
2010–11	Milsami	Moldovan National Division	31	26	0	0	—		—		31	26
2011–12	Milsami	Moldovan National Division	2	0	0	0	—		2	0	4	0
2011–12	AZAL	Azerbaijan Premier League	27	5	3	0	—		—		30	5
2012–13	Milsami	Moldovan National Division	29	16	3	0	—		2	2	34	18
2013–14	Milsami	Moldovan National Division	21	13	2	2	—		2	0	25	15
Total	Azerbaijan		27	5	3	0	—		—		30	5
Total	Moldova		83	55	5	0	—		6	2	94	55
Career total			110	60	8	0	—		6	2	124	60

=== International goals ===
Scores and results list Moldova's goal tally first.

No	Date	Venue	Opponent	Score	Result	Competition
1.	14 June 2015	Rheinpark Stadion, Vaduz, Liechtenstein	Liechtenstein	1–1	1–1	UEFA Euro 2016 qualification

== Honours ==
=== Club ===
- Moldovan Super Cup
  - Winner: 1 – 2012 with Milsami
