= Alexandru Pașcenco =

Moldovan footballer

Personal information
- Date of birth: 28 May 1989 (age 37)
- Place of birth: Tiraspol, Moldova
- Height: 1.83 m (6 ft 0 in)
- Position: Midfielder

Team information
- Current team: Florești

Youth career
- Sheriff Tiraspol

Senior career*
Years	Team	Apps	(Gls)
2005–2006	Sheriff Tiraspol	4	(1)
2006–2007	Tiraspol	27	(0)
2008	Tiligul-Tiras Tiraspol	33	(3)
2009	Tiraspol	26	(2)
2010	Tighina	13	(5)
2010–2012	Rapid Ghidighici	59	(4)
2012–2013	Sheriff Tiraspol	44	(10)
2014	Ararat Yerevan	7	(0)
2014	Zimbru Chișinău	10	(0)
2015	Naft Masjed Soleyman	12	(1)
2015	Academia Chișinău	13	(3)
2016	Dinamo-Auto	9	(1)
2016	Vereya	5	(0)
2017	Dacia Chișinău	29	(5)
2018	Dinamo-Auto	10	(0)
2018–2019	Sfântul Gheorghe	11	(0)
2019–	Florești		

International career
	Moldova U17	7	(2)
	Moldova U19	3	(0)
	Moldova U21	3	(0)
2012–	Moldova	14	(0)
- * Club domestic league appearances and goals

Alexandru Pașcenco (born 28 May 1989) is a Moldavian footballer who currently plays as a midfielder for FC Florești and the Moldova national football team.

== Career ==
In February 2014, Pașcenco signed a 3.5-year contract with Armenian Premier League side FC Ararat Yerevan.

On June 11, 2014, Zimbru Chișinău announced the signing of Pașcenco

At the end of June 2016, he signed with the Bulgarian team FC Vereya.

In 2019, Pașcenco joined FC Florești.

== Honours ==
Zimbru Chișinău

- Moldovan Super Cup: 2014
