= Miral Samardžić =

Slovenian footballer (born 1987)

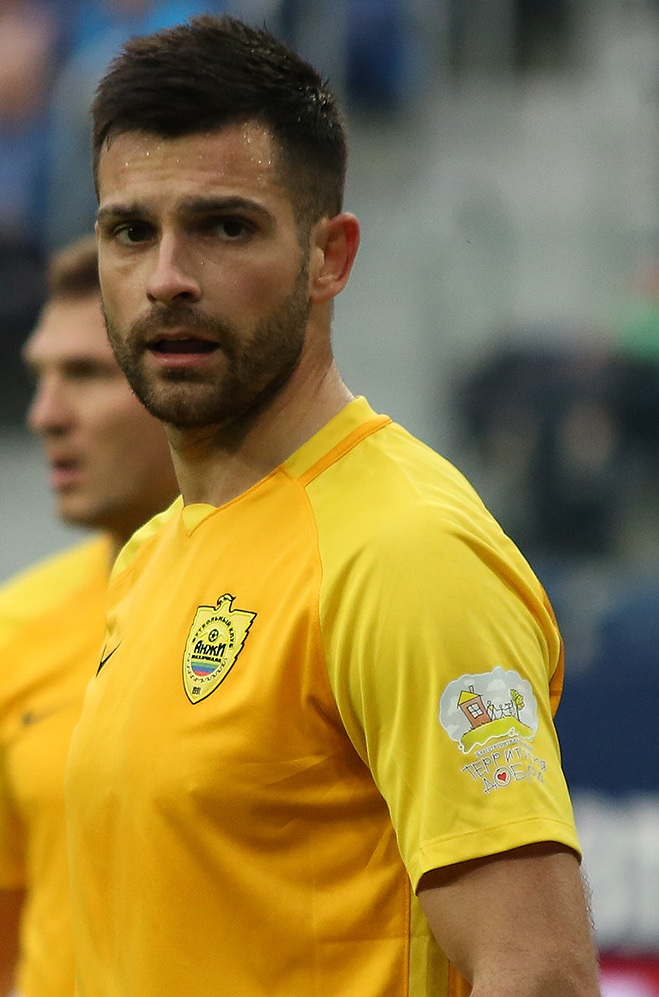
- Samardžić with Anzhi Makhachkala in 2018

Personal information
- Date of birth: 17 February 1987 (age 39)
- Place of birth: Jesenice, SFR Yugoslavia
- Height: 1.87 m (6 ft 2 in)
- Position: Centre-back

Team information
- Current team: Jesenice

Youth career
- 1996–2003: Jesenice
- 2003–2006: Triglav Kranj

Senior career*
Years	Team	Apps	(Gls)
2004–2007	Triglav Kranj	24	(3)
2007–2010	Maribor	60	(0)
2010–2014	Sheriff Tiraspol	105	(10)
2014–2016	Rijeka	52	(6)
2016	Henan Jianye	13	(0)
2017	Akhisar Belediyespor	3	(0)
2017–2018	Anzhi Makhachkala	19	(1)
2018–2019	Krylia Sovetov Samara	22	(1)
2019–2021	Olimpija Ljubljana	44	(2)
2021	Hatta	12	(2)
2021–2023	Ajman	44	(2)
2023–	Jesenice	12	(0)

International career
2006–2007	Slovenia U20	5	(0)
2006–2008	Slovenia U21	8	(0)
2013–2017	Slovenia	15	(0)
- * Club domestic league appearances and goals as of 14 January 2024

Miral Samardžić (born 17 February 1987) is a Slovenian footballer who plays as a centre-back for Jesenice.

== Club career ==
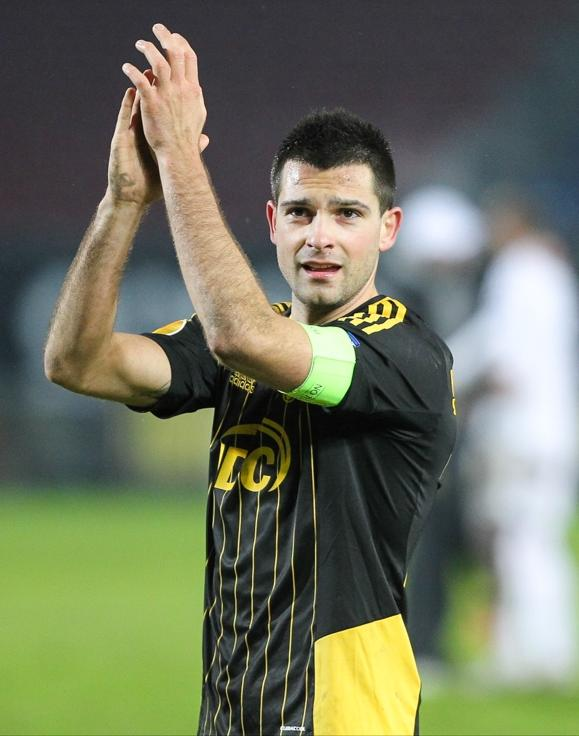
Samardžić with Sheriff Tiraspol in 2013

Samardžić started playing football in his hometown Jesenice, aged 9. He started his professional career with Triglav Kranj. In early 2007, Samardžić signed for Maribor. Following four seasons with Maribor, he was signed by Moldovan team Sheriff Tiraspol in 2010, where he stayed for four seasons.

=== Rijeka ===
In July 2014, Samardžić signed for Rijeka in Croatia. He scored on his debut in Rijeka's 2–1 win against Dinamo Zagreb in the 2014 Croatian Supercup.

=== Henan Jianye ===
After two seasons with Rijeka, in June 2016, Samardžić transferred to Chinese Super League side Henan Jianye for a reported fee of €1.5 million.

=== Anzhi Makhachkala ===
On 31 August 2017, Anzhi Makhachkala announced the signing of Samardžić on a two-year contract.

=== Krylia Sovetov Samara ===
On 19 August 2018, Samardžić signed with another Russian Premier League club Krylia Sovetov Samara.

=== Olimpija Ljubljana ===
On 11 July 2019, Samardžić returned to Slovenia and signed with Olimpija Ljubljana.

== International career ==
Samardžić was a member of the youth Slovenia national team selections. He debuted for the senior team on 19 November 2013 against Canada and has collected 15 caps between 2013 and 2017. His final international was in March 2017, in a World Cup qualification match away against Scotland.

== Career statistics ==
=== Club ===
As of match played 19 December 2020

Appearances and goals by club, season and competition
Club	Season	League			National cup		Continental		Other		Total	
Club	Season	Division	Apps	Goals	Apps	Goals	Apps	Goals	Apps	Goals	Apps	Goals
Triglav Kranj	2004–05	2. SNL	1	0	0	0	—		—		1	0
Triglav Kranj	2005–06	2. SNL	10	1	0	0	—		—		10	1
Triglav Kranj	2006–07	2. SNL	13	2	—		—		—		13	2
Triglav Kranj	Total		24	3	0	0	0	0	0	0	24	3
Maribor	2006–07	1. SNL	13	0	3	0	—		—		16	0
Maribor	2007–08	1. SNL	21	0	2	0	3 (Note: Appearance(s) in UEFA Intertoto Cup)	1	—		26	1
Maribor	2008–09	1. SNL	9	0	0	0	—		—		9	0
Maribor	2009–10	1. SNL	17	0	1	0	3 (Note: One appearance in UEFA Champions League, two appearances in UEFA Europa League)	0	0	0	21	0
Maribor	Total		60	0	6	0	6	1	0	0	72	1
Sheriff Tiraspol	2009–10	National Division	7	0			—		—		7	0
Sheriff Tiraspol	2010–11	National Division	26	2			8 (Note: Four appearances in UEFA Champions League, four appearances in UEFA Europa League)	0	—		34	2
Sheriff Tiraspol	2011–12	National Division	25	3			2 (Note: Appearance(s) in UEFA Europa League)	0	—		27	3
Sheriff Tiraspol	2012–13	National Division	23	4	1	0	6 (Note: Four appearances and one goal in UEFA Champions League, two appearances in UEFA Europa League)	1	1 (Note: Appearance(s) in Moldovan Super Cup)	0	31	5
Sheriff Tiraspol	2013–14	National Division	24	1	2	0	12 (Note: Four appearances in UEFA Champions League, eight appearances in UEFA Europa League)	0	1	0	39	1
Sheriff Tiraspol	2014–15	National Division	0	0	0	0	0	0	1	0	1	0
Sheriff Tiraspol	Total		105	10	3	0	28	1	3	0	139	11
Rijeka	2014–15	1. HNL	22	2	4	1	9	1	1 (Note: Appearance(s) in Croatian Super Cup)	1	36	5
Rijeka	2015–16	1. HNL	30	4	5	2	2	0	—		37	6
Rijeka	Total		52	6	9	3	11	1	1	1	73	11
Henan Jianye	2016	Chinese Super League	13	0	2	0	—		—		15	0
Akhisar Belediyespor	2016–17	Süper Lig	3	0	5	1	—		—		8	1
Anzhi Makhachkala	2017–18	Russian Premier League	19	1	0	0	—		2 (Note: Appearance(s) in relegation play-offs)	0	21	1
Krylia Sovetov Samara	2018–19	Russian Premier League	22	1	1	0	—		2	0	25	1
Olimpija Ljubljana	2019–20	1. SNL	32	0	0	0	2	0	—		34	0
Olimpija Ljubljana	2020–21	1. SNL	12	2	1	1	2	0	—		15	3
Olimpija Ljubljana	Total		44	2	1	1	4	0	0	0	49	3
Career total			342	23	27	5	49	3	8	1	426	32

=== International ===
Appearances and goals by national team and year
National team	Year	Apps	Goals
Slovenia	2013	1	0
Slovenia	2014	4	0
Slovenia	2015	2	0
Slovenia	2016	7	0
Slovenia	2017	1	0
Total		15	0
