= Adrian Sosnovschi =

Footballer

Personal information
- Date of birth: 13 June 1977 (age 49)
- Place of birth: Chișinău, Moldavian SSR, Soviet Union
- Height: 1.91 m (6 ft 3 in)
- Position: Defender

Senior career*
Years	Team	Apps	(Gls)
1993–1995	Codru Călăraşi	42	(0)
1996–1997	Zimbru Chişinău	15	(2)
1997–1998	Dynamo Kyiv	0	(0)
1997–1998	→ Dynamo-2 Kyiv	29	(2)
1997–1998	→ Dynamo-3 Kyiv	22	(0)
1999	Spartak Moscow	0	(0)
1999	→ Spartak-d Moscow	9	(0)
1999–2003	Saturn	91	(2)
2003–2004	Chernomorets Novorossiysk	27	(3)
2005–2006	Kairat	12	(2)
2006	Dacia Chişinău	13	(1)
2007	Torpedo Moscow	12	(0)
2007–2008	Khabarovsk	9	(1)
2008–2010	Olimpia Balti	11	(1)
2010	Zimbru Chişinău	13	(4)
2010–2013	Milsami Orhei	56	(6)

International career
1999–2002	Moldova	16	(0)

Managerial career
- 2016–2017: Milsami Orhei
- 2018: Atyrau
- 2022: Moldova U-17
- 2024: Spartanii Sportul
- 2025–2026: Spartanii Sportul
- * Club domestic league appearances and goals

Adrian Sosnovschi (born 13 June 1977) is a Moldovan football manager and a former player who played as a defender. He also holds Russian citizenship as (Russian: Андриан Вячеславович Сосновский, romanized: Andrian Vyacheslavovich Sosnovsky).

== Management career ==
On 11 April 2018, Sosnovschi was appointed as the new manager of Atyrau.
