= João Pereira (footballer, born 1990) =

Portuguese footballer

Personal information
- Full name: João Duarte Vieira Pereira
- Date of birth: 10 May 1990 (age 36)
- Place of birth: Cartaxo, Portugal
- Height: 1.83 m (6 ft 0 in)
- Position: Centre-back

Youth career
- 2001–2004: SL Cartaxo
- 2004–2009: Benfica

Senior career*
Years	Team	Apps	(Gls)
2009–2011	Benfica	0	(0)
2009–2011	→ Fátima (loan)	48	(2)
2011–2012	Beira-Mar	0	(0)
2011	→ Trofense (loan)	7	(0)
2012–2013	Sheriff	10	(0)
2013	Nordsjælland	0	(0)
2013–2015	Vejle	47	(0)
2015–2016	SønderjyskE	24	(1)
2016–2018	Odense	23	(0)
2018–2020	SønderjyskE	6	(1)
2021–2023	Torreense	38	(1)
Total		203	(5)

International career
2005–2006	Portugal U16	7	(0)
2006–2007	Portugal U17	8	(0)
2008	Portugal U18	4	(0)
2008–2009	Portugal U19	11	(0)
2010	Portugal U20	4	(0)
2011–2012	Portugal U21	15	(1)
- * Club domestic league appearances and goals

João Duarte Vieira Pereira (born 10 May 1990) is a Portuguese former professional footballer who played as a central defender.

== Club career ==
Born in Cartaxo, Santarém District, Pereira started playing football in 2001 at Sport Lisboa e Cartaxo, a subsidiary club of S.L. Benfica. He represented the former for three years, until he was called up by the latter to finish his development.

After signing a professional contract, Pereira trained with the first team at Benfica Campus in Seixal, but also in the pre-season tour of Nyon. Upon arriving in Switzerland, he was loaned to C.D. Fátima for one year, making his professional debut on 20 September by playing the full 90 minutes in a 1–2 home loss against S.C. Beira-Mar. He appeared in 24 games and scored once in each of his two seasons in the Segunda Liga, helping to a best-ever eighth place in 2009–10.

In June 2011, Pereira opted to terminate his contract with Benfica and sign a two-year deal with Beira-Mar. He would never appear for the team in a competitive game, being loaned the following month to C.D. Trofense also from the second division. In December, he agreed to a three-and-a-half-year deal with FC Sheriff Tiraspol.

Pereira made his Moldovan National Division debut on 3 March 2012, playing as left back and providing an assist in a 2–0 away win over FC Costuleni, going on to contribute to the club's eleventh league title. He moved teams in countries again in January 2013, joining FC Nordsjælland from Denmark, after winning another league medal with Sheriff.

In late August 2013, after failing to receive any playing time, Pereira signed a six-month contract with Danish second tier club Vejle BK. He extended his link in November for another six months, and again in April 2014 for another year.

Pereira moved to SønderjyskE Fodbold in June 2015. In January of the following year, website Bold announced that fellow Danish Superliga side Odense Boldklub had signed him for the 2016–17 campaign.

== International career ==
Pereira earned 49 caps for Portugal across all youth levels. He played seven times for the under-16 team, helping them win the Santarém Tournament in February 2006 and finish seventh in the Montaigu Tournament in April. Later in the year, he participated in the Nike Tournament with the under-17s, also competing in the Algarve International Tournament in February 2007.

Pereira represented the under-19 team during the Ireland Tournament in August 2008, the La Manga Tournament in February 2009 and the Porto Tournament in April. Additionally, he played in the two qualifying rounds for the 2009 UEFA European Championship, but the nation did not qualify.

On 9 February 2011, Pereira first appeared with the under-21 side, starting in a 3–1 friendly victory over Sweden in his hometown. His only international goal arrived on 1 September of that year during a 2–0 away defeat of Moldova for the 2013 European Championship qualifiers, in which Portugal finished in second thus failing to progress to the finals.

== Career statistics ==
As of match played 10 December 2017

Appearances and goals by club, season and competition
Club	Season	League			National Cup		League Cup		Other		Total	
Club	Season	Division	Apps	Goals	Apps	Goals	Apps	Goals	Apps	Goals	Apps	Goals
Fátima	2009–10	Segunda Liga	24	1	0	0	1	0	—		25	1
Fátima	2010–11	Segunda Liga	24	1	0	0	4	0	—		28	1
Fátima	Total		48	2	0	0	5	0	0	0	53	2
Trofense	2011–12	Segunda Liga	7	0	0	0	0	0	—		7	0
Sheriff	2011–12	National Division	9	0	0	0	—		0	0	9	0
Sheriff	2012–13	National Division	1	0	0	0	—		4 (Note: Appearances in UEFA Champions League)	0	5	0
Sheriff	Total		10	0	0	0	—		4	0	14	0
Vejle	2013–14	1. Division	23	0	2	0	—		—		25	0
Vejle	2014–15	1. Division	24	0	0	0	—		—		24	0
Vejle	Total		47	0	2	0	—		0	0	49	0
SønderjyskE	2015–16	Superliga	24	1	1	0	—		0	0	25	1
Odense	2016–17	Superliga	12	0	0	0	—		0	0	12	0
Odense	2017–18	Superliga	7	0	1	0	—		0	0	8	0
Odense	Total		19	0	1	0	—		0	0	20	0
Career total			155	3	4	0	5	0	4	0	168	3
