= Andrei Macrițchii =

Moldovan footballer

Personal information
- Date of birth: 13 February 1996 (age 30)
- Place of birth: Bălți, Moldova
- Height: 1.85 m (6 ft 1 in)
- Positions: Full-back; winger

Team information
- Current team: Zimbru Chișinău
- Number: 30

Youth career
- –2013: Sheriff Tiraspol

Senior career*
Years	Team	Apps	(Gls)
2013–2019	Sheriff Tiraspol	2	(0)
2014–2015	→ Tiraspol (loan)	17	(0)
2016	→ Petrocub Hîncești (loan)	10	(0)
2017–2018	→ Petrocub Hîncești (loan)	25	(1)
2018	→ Sfântul Gheorghe (loan)	8	(1)
2019–2020	Dinamo-Auto	18	(2)
2020–2022	Ripensia Timișoara	45	(2)
2023–	Zimbru Chișinău	63	(1)

International career^{‡}
2012–2013	Moldova U-17	3	(0)
2014	Moldova U-18	1	(0)
2013–2014	Moldova U-19	7	(0)
2015–2018	Moldova U-21	26	(1)
2018–	Moldova	2	(0)
- * Club domestic league appearances and goals as of 1 June 2026 ‡ National team caps and goals as of 18 April 2023

Andrei Macrițchii (born 13 February 1996) is a Moldovan football player who plays for Moldovan Liga club Zimbru Chișinău.

== Club career ==
He made his Moldovan National Division debut for Sheriff Tiraspol on 31 May 2013 in a game against Nistru Otaci.

== International ==
He made his debut for senior Moldova national football team on 26 February 2018 in a friendly against Saudi Arabia.

== Personal life ==
He is a twin brother of Valerii Macrițchii.

== Honours ==
FC Sheriff Tiraspol

- Divizia Națională: 2012–13, 2013–14, 2015–16
- Divizia "A": 2016–17
- Moldovan Super Cup: 2015
