= Cornel Gheți =

Romanian footballer

Personal information
- Date of birth: 23 June 1986 (age 40)
- Place of birth: Luduș, România
- Height: 1.67 m (5 ft 6 in)
- Position: Midfielder

Senior career*
Years	Team	Apps	(Gls)
2003–2006	Mureșul Luduș		
2006–2008	IS Câmpia Turzii	63	(8)
2008–2009	Jiul Petroşani	37	(6)
2009–2010	Târgu Mureș	4	(0)
2010	Arieșul Turda	13	(0)
2011	Brăila	11	(0)
2011–2016	Milsami Orhei	114	(8)
- * Club domestic league appearances and goals as of 16 January 2017 ‡ National team caps and goals as of 23 August 2013

Cornel Gheți (born 23 June 1986) is a Romanian former footballer.

== Honours ==
=== Club ===
Milsami Orhei

- Moldovan National Division: 2014–15
- Moldovan Cup: 2011-12
- Moldovan Super Cup: 2012
