= Alexandru Onica =

Moldovan professional footballer (born 1984)

Personal information
- Date of birth: 29 July 1984 (age 42)
- Place of birth: Drăsliceni, Moldavian SSR
- Height: 1.77 m (5 ft 10 in)
- Position: Defensive midfielder

Senior career*
Years	Team	Apps	(Gls)
2001–2003	Hîncești	3	(0)
2003–2005	Unisport-Auto Chișinău	36	(0)
2005	Spartak Chelyabinsk	9	(0)
2005–2006	Dacia Chișinău	11	(0)
2006	KAMAZ	3	(0)
2006–2009	Dacia Chișinău	70	(9)
2010–2012	Vorskla Poltava	8	(0)
2011–2012	→ Dacia Chișinău (loan)	30	(2)
2012–2013	Sheriff Tiraspol	41	(0)
2013	Lokomotiv Tashkent	11	(0)
2014	Neftchi Farg'ona	21	(1)
2015	Zimbru Chișinău	8	(0)
2015–2018	Zaria Bălți	59	(5)
2018	Zimbru Chișinău	21	(2)
2019–2020	Milsami Orhei	27	(0)
2020–2021	Petrocub Hîncești	34	(5)

International career
2008–2015	Moldova	22	(0)
- * Club domestic league appearances and goals

Alexandru Onica (born 29 July 1984) is a Moldovan former professional footballer who played as a midfielder.

== Club career ==
Onica began playing football with local side Izvorash Draslicheny at age 12. He joined FC Unisport-Auto Chișinău next before a move to Russia where he played for FC Spartak Chelyabinsk and FC KAMAZ Naberezhnye Chelny. Upon returning from Russia, he joined FC Dacia Chișinău where he would be named the top central midfielder in the 2009 Moldovan National Division by the FMF.

Onica joined Vorskla Poltava on a free transfer in December 2009, signing a three-year contract with the club.

In July 2013, he signed a contract with Lokomotiv Tashkent. On 31 July 2013, he made his debut for Lokomotv in the Uzbek Cup semifinal match against Bunyodkor. In January, he signed for another Uzbekistan club Neftchi Farg'ona FK. Alexandru scored his first goal in Uzbekistan higher division on 22 June against FK Andijan.

== International career ==
Onica has made 22 appearances for the Moldova national team. He played for the under-21 national team before making his senior debut in a friendly against Estonia on 18 November 2008.
