= Serghei Gheorghiev =

Moldovan footballer

Personal information
- Full name: Serghei Gheorghiev
- Date of birth: 20 October 1991 (age 35)
- Place of birth: Chirsova, Moldova
- Height: 1.76 m (5 ft 9 1/2 in)
- Position: Midfielder

Team information
- Current team: Dinamo-Auto

Senior career*
Years	Team	Apps	(Gls)
2008–2013	Sheriff Tiraspol	91	(13)
2013–2014	Tiraspol	4	(2)
2013–2014	→ Dinamo-Auto (loan)	16	(1)
2014–2015	Sheriff Tiraspol	9	(0)
2015	→ Navbahor Namangan (loan)	11	(2)
2015	Buxoro	6	(2)
2015–2016	Sheriff Tiraspol	0	(0)
2016	Gagauziya-Oguzsport		
2017–	Dinamo-Auto	29	(0)

International career^{‡}
	Moldova U17	3	(0)
	Moldova U19	3	(0)
	Moldova U21	9	(0)
2011–2015	Moldova	18	(0)
- * Club domestic league appearances and goals as of 14 June 2018 ‡ National team caps and goals as of 14 June 2018

Serghei Gheorghiev (born 20 October 1991) in Chirsova is a Moldovan footballer who plays as a midfielder for Navbahor Namangan in the Uzbek League and the Moldova national football team.

== Club career ==
=== FC Sheriff ===
In 2008 Gheorghiev signed for Divizia Naţională outfit Sheriff Tiraspol.

In March 2015, Gheorghiev was loaned to Uzbek side Navbahor Namangan for the remainder of 2015.

== International career ==
On 9 February 2011 he made his debut for the Moldova national football team in a friendly match against Andorra
