= Marcel Metoua =

Ivorian professional footballer (born 1988)

Marcel Métoua
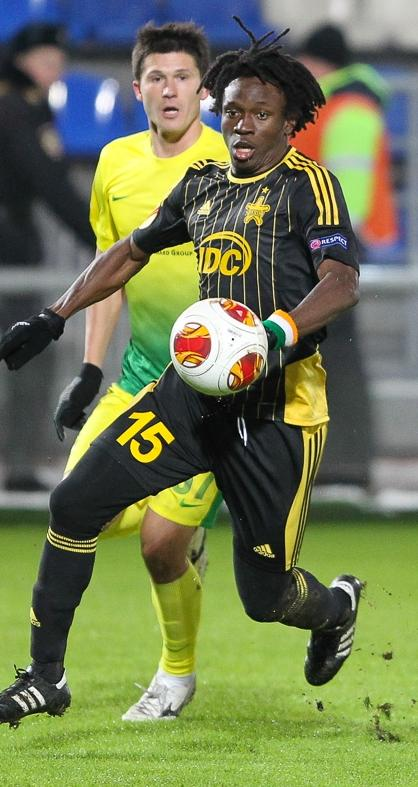
- Metoua with FC Sheriff in 2013

Personal information
- Full name: Marcel Kpamin Kouégbé Métoua
- Date of birth: 15 November 1988 (age 37)
- Place of birth: Attecoubé, Ivory Coast
- Height: 1.86 m (6 ft 1 in)
- Position: Defender

Senior career*
Years	Team	Apps	(Gls)
2006–2008	ASC Ouragahio		
2008	Fruškogorac		
2008–2011	Banat Zrenjanin	57	(0)
2011–2016	Sheriff Tiraspol	107	(10)
- * Club domestic league appearances and goals as of 22 December 2016 ‡ National team caps and goals as of 27 September 2011

Marcel Kpamin Kouégbé Métoua (born 15 November 1988) is an Ivorian professional footballer who plays as a defender. He has played for Ivorian side ASC Ouragahio, Serbian FK Banat Zrenjanin and last, and most extensively, played for FC Sheriff Tiraspol in the Moldovan National Division.

== Career ==
Born in Attecoubé, he started his career in 2006, playing with the Ivorian club ASC Ouragahio. In January 2008, he moved to Serbia to play with a lower league club, FK Fruškogorac. After 6 months, he signed with Serbian SuperLiga club FK Banat Zrenjanin, where he played until the summer of 2011. He played in the 2009-10 and the 2010–11 season in the Serbian First League. After the first season with Banat, the club was relegated. In the summer of 2011, FC Sheriff Tiraspol made the best offer and signed him.

On 22 December 2016, Sheriff Tiraspol announced that they had decided not to extend Métoua's contract, and that he would become a free agent after five years with the club.

== Career statistics ==
As of match played 21 October 2016

Appearances and goals by club, season and competition
Club	Season	League			National Cup		Continental		Other		Total	
Club	Season	Division	Apps	Goals	Apps	Goals	Apps	Goals	Apps	Goals	Apps	Goals
Sheriff Tiraspol	2011–12	Divizia Națională	32	3	2	0	2	0	-		36	3
Sheriff Tiraspol	2012–13	Divizia Națională	31	3	0	0	6	0	1	0	38	3
Sheriff Tiraspol	2013–14	Divizia Națională	27	3	3	0	12	0	1	0	43	3
Sheriff Tiraspol	2014–15	Divizia Națională	7	1	2	0	6	0	1	0	16	1
Sheriff Tiraspol	2015–16	Divizia Națională	5	0	1	0	1	0	1	0	8	0
Sheriff Tiraspol	2016–17	Divizia Națională	5	0	1	0	2	0	1	0	9	0
Sheriff Tiraspol	Total		107	10	9	0	29	0	5	0	150	10
Career total			107	10	9	0	29	0	5	0	150	10

== Honours ==
Sheriff

- Moldovan National Division (4): 2011–12, 2012–13, 2013–14, 2015–16
- Moldovan Cup (1): 2014–15
- Moldovan Super Cup (4): 2013, 2014, 2015, 2016

== External sources ==
- Profile and stats at Srbijafudbal.
