= Denis Rassulov =

Moldovan footballer

Personal information
- Full name: Denis Rassulov
- Date of birth: 2 January 1990 (age 36)
- Place of birth: Chişinău, Moldova
- Height: 1.77 m (5 ft 10 in)
- Position: Defender

Team information
- Current team: Zaria Bălți

Senior career*
Years	Team	Apps	(Gls)
2007–2009	Iskra-Stal Rîbniţa	10	(0)
2009–2010	CSCA-Rapid Chişinău	2	(0)
2011–2016	Milsami Orhei	110	(1)
2016–2017	Daugavpils	6	(0)
2017–	Zaria Bălți	0	(0)

International career^{‡}
2014–	Moldova	1	(0)
- * Club domestic league appearances and goals as of 13 March 2017 (UTC) ‡ National team caps and goals as of 4 February 2014

Denis Rassulov (born 2 January 1990) is a Moldovan football player who currently plays for Zaria Bălți in the Moldovan National Division. He made his debut for the Moldova national football team in 2014.
