= Valentin Furdui =

Moldovan footballer

Personal information
- Full name: Valentin Furdui
- Date of birth: 1 September 1987 (age 39)
- Place of birth: Chișinău, Moldova
- Height: 1.85 m (6 ft 1 in)
- Position: Midfielder

Team information
- Current team: Spartanii Selemet
- Number: 5

Senior career*
Years	Team	Apps	(Gls)
2007–2008	Rapid Ghidighici	22	(0)
2009	Sfîntul Gheorghe	5	(0)
2009–2010	Zimbru Chișinău	10	(1)
2010	Milsami	17	(2)
2010–2011	Zimbru Chișinău	14	(2)
2011–2013	Milsami	51	(4)
2013–2014	Sheriff Tiraspol	29	(1)
2014	Kaisar	12	(2)
2015	Zimbru Chișinău	4	(0)
2015–2018	FC Dacia Chisinau	0	(0)
2018–2019	FK Palanga	14	(1)
2019-	Spartanii Selemet	3	(0)
- * Club domestic league appearances and goals as of 11:41, 19 March 2015 (UTC)

Valentin Furdui (born 1 September 1987) is a Moldovan footballer who plays for Spartanii Selemet as a midfielder.

== Career ==
Furdui had his FC Sheriff Tiraspol contract cancelled by mutual consent on 18 June 2014. Going on to sign for Kazakhstan Premier League side FC Kaisar in early July of the same year.
