= Andrian Negai =

Moldovan footballer

Personal information
- Full name: Andrian Negai
- Date of birth: 28 January 1985 (age 41)
- Place of birth: Chișinău, Moldovan SSR
- Height: 1.80 m (5 ft 11 in)
- Position: Goalkeeper

Team information
- Current team: FC Milsami Orhei
- Number: 50

Senior career*
Years	Team	Apps	(Gls)
2009–2010	FC Zimbru Chișinău	11	(0)
2010–	FC Milsami Orhei	83	(0)

International career^{‡}
2013–	Moldova	2	(0)
- * Club domestic league appearances and goals as of 10 May 2014 ‡ National team caps and goals as of 14 June 2013

Andrian Negai (born 28 January 1985 in Chișinău) is a Moldovan international footballer who currently plays for FC Milsami Orhei.
