= Tadej Apatič =

Slovenian footballer

Personal information
- Full name: Tadej Apatič
- Date of birth: 7 July 1987 (age 39)
- Place of birth: Murska Sobota, SFR Yugoslavia
- Height: 1.75 m (5 ft 9 in)
- Position: Left back

Team information
- Current team: Beltinci (sports dir.)

Youth career
- 1994–2002: Beltinci
- 2002–2005: Mura
- 2005–2006: Domžale

Senior career*
Years	Team	Apps	(Gls)
2005	Beltinci	2	(0)
2006–2012	Domžale	132	(4)
2007	→ Ihan (loan)	1	(0)
2012–2013	Sheriff Tiraspol	12	(1)
2013	Olimpija Ljubljana	4	(0)
2014	Slavia Sofia	13	(0)
2015	Beltinci		
2015	Deutschlandsberger SC	10	(0)
2016	UFC Jennersdorf	12	(2)
2016–2020	Beltinci	89	(1)

International career
2004	Slovenia U17	2	(1)
2006–2007	Slovenia U20	2	(0)
2007–2008	Slovenia U21	7	(0)
- * Club domestic league appearances and goals as of 3 August 2023

Tadej Apatič (born 7 July 1987 in Murska Sobota) is a Slovenian retired footballer who is the current sports director of Beltinci.

== Club career ==
He formerly played for Domžale before joining Sheriff Tiraspol in July 2012. He later had a spell in the Austrian lower leagues.
