= Valerian Gârlă =

Romanian footballer

Personal information
- Full name: Valerian Zaharia Gârlă
- Date of birth: 6 July 1986 (age 40)
- Place of birth: Berbești, Romania
- Height: 1.70 m (5 ft 7 in)
- Position: Midfielder

Team information
- Current team: SpVgg Ingelheim

Senior career*
Years	Team	Apps	(Gls)
2002–2003	Extensiv Craiova	2	(0)
2003–2004	FC Craiova	14	(0)
2004–2005	FC Caracal	14	(2)
2005–2007	Universitatea Craiova	34	(0)
2007–2008	FC Caracal	15	(4)
2008–2010	CSM Râmnicu Vâlcea	37	(2)
2010	Mureșul Deva	13	(3)
2011–2013	Milsami Orhei	64	(6)
2013–2014	Argeşul Piteşti		
2014–2017	Hassia Bingen		
2017–	SpVgg Ingelheim		

International career
2007–2008	Romania U-21		
- * Club domestic league appearances and goals as of 16 February 2016

Valerian Zaharia Gârlă (born 6 July 1986 in Berbești, Vâlcea, Romania) is a Romanian footballer who plays as a midfielder for SpVgg Ingelheim.
