= Eugen Slivca =

Moldovan footballer

Personal information
- Date of birth: 13 July 1989 (age 37)
- Place of birth: Moldova
- Height: 1.84 m (6 ft 1/2 in)
- Position: Midfielder

Team information
- Current team: Athlone Town

Senior career*
Years	Team	Apps	(Gls)
2009–2011	Academia Chișinău	59	(4)
2011–2013	Zimbru Chișinău	42	(2)
2013	Speranța Crihana Veche	8	(0)
2014–2016	Milsami Orhei	31	(1)
2016	Academia Chișinău	10	(1)
2017–2021	Sfântul Gheorghe	82	(8)
2022–	Athlone Town	4	(0)

International career
2009–2010	Moldova U21	6	(0)
- * Club domestic league appearances and goals as of 23:55, 1 May 2022 (UTC)

Eugen Slivca (born 13 July 1989) is a Moldovan footballer who plays as a midfielder for League of Ireland First Division club Athlone Town.
