= Nail Zamaliyev =

Russian footballer

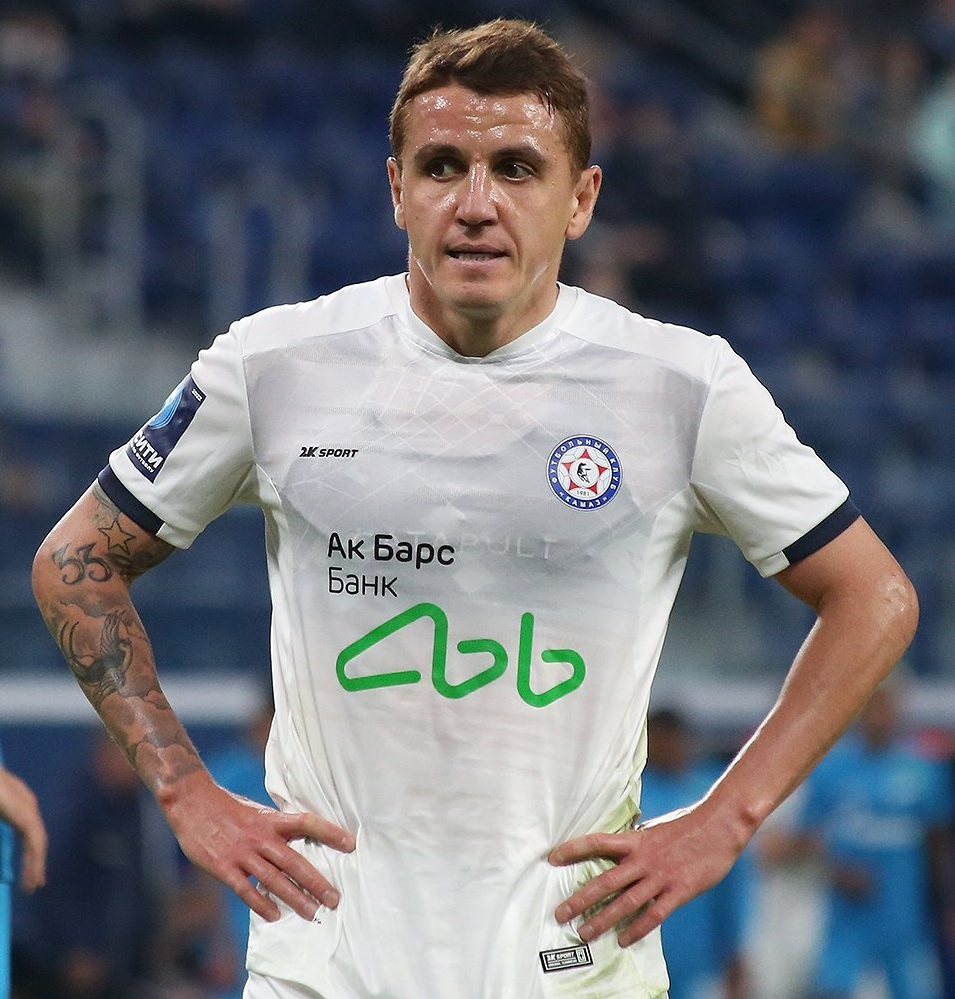
- Zamaliyev with KAMAZ in 2022

Personal information
- Full name: Nail Akhtyamovich Zamaliyev
- Date of birth: 9 July 1989 (age 37)
- Place of birth: Kazan, Russian SFSR
- Height: 1.77 m (5 ft 10 in)
- Position: Central midfielder

Senior career*
Years	Team	Apps	(Gls)
2006–2010	FC Dynamo Moscow	0	(0)
2010	→ FC Salyut Belgorod (loan)	26	(1)
2011–2013	FC Sheriff Tiraspol	42	(8)
2012	→ PFC Spartak Nalchik (loan)	7	(0)
2013	→ FC Torpedo Moscow (loan)	2	(0)
2013	→ FC SKA-Energiya Khabarovsk (loan)	21	(2)
2014	FC Tosno	10	(1)
2014–2015	FC SKA-Energiya Khabarovsk	32	(0)
2015–2016	FC Volga Nizhny Novgorod	35	(1)
2016–2017	FC Neftekhimik Nizhnekamsk	21	(1)
2017–2018	FC Rotor Volgograd	19	(0)
2018–2019	FC Luch Vladivostok	32	(3)
2019–2020	FC Armavir	18	(0)
2020	FC Volgar Astrakhan	5	(0)
2020–2021	FC Fakel Voronezh	29	(1)
2021–2022	FC KAMAZ Naberezhnye Chelny	21	(0)
2022–2023	FC Amkar Perm	17	(2)
2024–2025	FC Sokol Kazan	32	(6)

International career
2007	Russia U-18	3	(0)
- * Club domestic league appearances and goals

Nail Akhtyamovich Zamaliyev (Russian: Наиль Ахтямович Замалиев; born 9 July 1989) is a Russian former professional football player.

== Club career ==
He made his Russian Football National League debut for FC Salyut Belgorod on 31 March 2010 in a game against FC Kuban Krasnodar.
