= Vladislav Stoyanov =

Bulgarian footballer

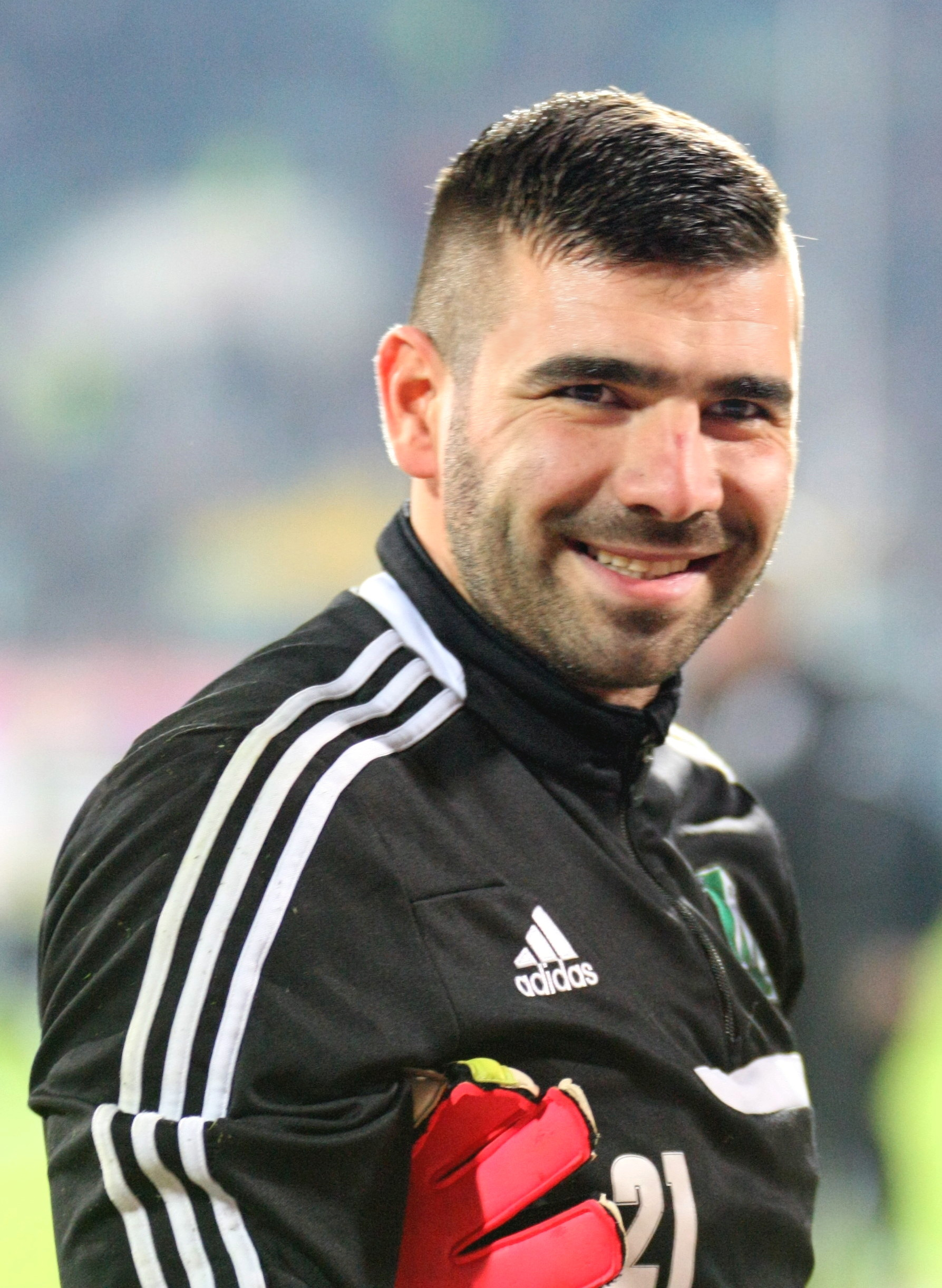

Personal information
- Full name: Vladislav Boykov Stoyanov
- Date of birth: 8 June 1987 (age 39)
- Place of birth: Pernik, Bulgaria
- Height: 1.88 m (6 ft 2 in)
- Position: Goalkeeper

Team information
- Current team: Ybbsitz

Youth career
- 1994–2000: Metalurg Pernik
- 2000–2004: CSKA Sofia

Senior career*
Years	Team	Apps	(Gls)
2004–2006	Naftex Burgas	4	(0)
2004–2005	→ Pomorie (loan)	2	(0)
2006–2010	Chernomorets Burgas	48	(0)
2010–2012	Sheriff Tiraspol	54	(0)
2013–2021	Ludogorets Razgrad	120	(0)
2023	Tundzha Tenevo	1	(0)
2024	Lilienfeld		
2025–	Ybbsitz		
Total		237	(0)

International career^{‡}
2010–2017	Bulgaria	19	(0)
- * Club domestic league appearances and goals as of 15 December 2020 (UTC) ‡ National team caps and goals as of 1 September 2017 (UTC)

Vladislav Boykov Stoyanov (Bulgarian: Владислав Бойков Стоянов; born 8 June 1987) is a Bulgarian footballer who played as a goalkeeper.

Stoyanov began his youth career with Metalurg Pernik before transferring to CSKA Sofia in 2000, where he developed in their academy. In 2004, he left CSKA to sign first professional contract with Naftex Burgas. Stoyanov then spent a three-and-a-half seasons at Chernomorets Burgas. In 2010, he joined Sheriff Tiraspol where he won two Moldovan National Division titles and one Moldovan Cup. After success in Moldova, Stoyanov moved back to Bulgaria to play for Ludogorets Razgrad. He was named 2014 Bulgarian Footballer of the Year.

In March 2017 he received a heavy injury while training with Bulgaria and returned at the end of 2019, but was forced to retire two years later, aged 34, due to ongoing problems.

== Career ==
=== Early career ===
Born in Pernik, Stoyanov began his career with the local club Metalurg, but joined the CSKA Sofia Academy in 2000, when he was 13. Stoyanov played four seasons for CSKA, but before he signed his first professional contract with the club, he decided to join Naftex Burgas.

=== Naftex Burgas ===
Stoyanov started his first 2005–06 season in the senior squad as third-choice goalkeeper, behind Svilen Simeonov and Ivan Čvorović. He kept a clean sheet in his league debut in a 1–0 victory over Cherno More Varna on 15 October 2005.

=== Chernomorets Burgas ===
In June 2006 Stoyanov joined Chernomorets Burgas in the East B PFG. He made his debut on 19 August, in a 1–1 home draw against Nesebar. After Chernomorets's promotion to the A PFG, he became a first-choice goalkeeper for the 2007–08 season. He earned 28 appearances and kept ten clean sheets during the season.

In July 2008, Dinamo Kyiv officially invited Stoyanov to join the training sessions for a week. He was the first choice goalkeeper for the team from Burgas during most of the 2008–09 season, but lost his place after the arrival of Pascal Borel.

=== Sheriff Tiraspol ===
In January 2010 Stoyanov signed for Sheriff Tiraspol. He made his Moldovan National Division debut on 7 March, in a 2–0 home win against Tiraspol. Stoyanov started his time with Sheriff great, keeping clean sheets in his first nine matches. On 4 August 2010, he saved three penalty shootout, in an eventual 6–5 win after penalty shootout over Dinamo Zagreb in the third qualifying round of the 2010–11 Champions League. On 18 December Stoyanov was named Goalkeeper of the year in Moldova.

=== Ludogorets Razgrad ===
On 11 January 2013, Ludogorets Razgrad completed the transfer of Stoyanov from Sheriff. On 13 December 2013, Stoyanov was named in the 2013–14 Team of the Europa League group stage. He kept a four clean sheets in five Group B games. Ludogorets moved on to reach the 1/8 finals of the competition during that season.

On 27 August 2014, Stoyanov kept a clean sheet in the 1–0 home win over Steaua București, but was sent off in the 119th minute of the match for fouling the advancing Fernando Varela and denying a goalscoring opportunity. His team won the penalty shootout to decide the match after field player Cosmin Moți saved two penalties and Ludogorets advanced to the group stages of the Champions League for the first time in their history. On 1 October 2014, in Ludogorets' home debut in the 2014–15 Champions League group phase against the current holders Real Madrid, Stoyanov managed to save one of the two Cristiano Ronaldo penalties, although his team eventually succumbed to a 1–2 loss.

==== Heavy injury ====
On 21 March 2017, Stoyanov suffered an injury while in training with the Bulgarian national team. A few days later it turned out that the injury was very serious - a torn patellar tendon, which would cause him to miss between six and eight months. On 25 April 2017, he needed a second intervention due to a problem, postponing his return until no earlier than 2018. In an interview on 4 February 2018, Stoyanov said that he hoped to return for the beginning of 2018–19 season, but after a few training sessions with the team, on 5 December 2018, Stoyanov announced that he would undergo another intervention due to a displaced kneecap. He was set to miss a second season in a row and was expected to return in the summer of 2019.

==== Return from injury ====
In September 2019 Stoyanov finally returned in the team and trained together with his teammates for first time in 30 months. On 9 November 2019 he returned in play after 966 days, playing for Ludogorets Razgrad II in league match against Hebar Pazardzhik. 3 years after his last match for Ludogorets Razgrad, he returned in the starting eleven on 5 March 2020 in a Cup match against Levski Sofia, lost by Ludogorets on penalties.

=== Retirement ===
On 7 July 2021, Stoyanov announced his retirement, due to ongoing problems with his injury.

=== Tundzha Tenevo ===
On 27 March 2023 it was announced that Stoyanov will play for the Tundzha 2006 Tenevo team in "B" Yambol Regional Group, the fifth and last division in Bulgaria. On 26 March he played, showed great skills and turned the match into a celebration.

== International career ==
Stoyanov earned his first call-up to the Bulgarian squad in 2010 while at Sheriff Tiraspol. On 12 October, he made his international debut in a friendly match against Saudi Arabia, playing the full 90 minutes of a 2–0 victory.

On 25 March 2016, Stoyanov made close to a dozen important saves, including one penalty from Cristiano Ronaldo, to help Bulgaria secure an unexpected 1–0 away win in a friendly game against Portugal. It was Bulgaria's first win against the Portuguese since December 1981, when they beat them 5–2 in Haskovo. It was also Stoyanov's second career penalty save against Cristiano Ronaldo.

== Interesting facts ==
He is only the second goalkeeper (behind Diego Alves) to save more than one penalty from Cristiano Ronaldo. The first was saved on 1 October 2014 in Ludogorets' Champions League group stage match against Real Madrid, lost 1–2, and the second in Bulgaria's friendly against Portugal, won 1–0.

== Career statistics ==
=== Club ===
As of 24 December 2020

Club	Season	League		Cup		Europe		Total	
Club	Season	Apps	Goals	Apps	Goals	Apps	Goals	Apps	Goals
Pomorie	2004–05	2	0	0	0	—		2	0
Pomorie	Total	2	0	0	0	0	0	2	0
Naftex Burgas	2005–06	4	0	1	0	—		5	0
Naftex Burgas	Total	4	0	1	0	0	0	5	0
Chernomorets Burgas	2006–07	9	0	0	0	—		9	0
Chernomorets Burgas	2007–08	28	0	1	0	—		29	0
Chernomorets Burgas	2008–09	11	0	0	0	4	0	15	0
Chernomorets Burgas	2009–10	0	0	0	0	—		0	0
Chernomorets Burgas	Total	48	0	1	0	4	0	53	0
Sheriff Tiraspol	2009–10	9	0	3	0	0	0	12	0
Sheriff Tiraspol	2010–11	18	0	3	0	10	0	31	0
Sheriff Tiraspol	2011–12	17	0	1	0	2	0	20	0
Sheriff Tiraspol	2012–13	10	0	0	0	6	0	16	0
Sheriff Tiraspol	Total	54	0	7	0	18	0	79	0
Ludogorets Razgrad	2012–13	14	0	0	0	0	0	14	0
Ludogorets Razgrad	2013–14	30	0	2	0	15	0	47	0
Ludogorets Razgrad	2014–15	23	0	6	0	11	0	40	0
Ludogorets Razgrad	2015–16	22	0	1	0	2	0	25	0
Ludogorets Razgrad	2016–17	18	0	0	0	13	0	31	0
Ludogorets Razgrad	2017–18	—							
Ludogorets Razgrad	2018–19	—							
Ludogorets Razgrad	2019–20	7	0	1	0	0	0	8	0
Ludogorets Razgrad	2020–21	6	0	0	0	1	0	7	0
Ludogorets Razgrad	Total	120	0	9	0	42	0	171	0
Ludogorets Razgrad II	2015–16	2	0	—		—		2	0
Ludogorets Razgrad II	2019–20	6	0	—		—		6	0
Career total		236	0	20	0	64	0	319	0

=== International ===
As of match played 6 September 2016.

Bulgaria national team
Year	Apps	Goals
2010	1	0
2011	3	0
2012	1	0
2013	4	0
2014	5	0
2015	0	0
2016	2	0
Total	16	0

== Honours ==
=== Club ===
Sheriff Tiraspol

- Divizia Naţională (2): 2009–10, 2011–12
- Moldovan Cup: 2009–10

Ludogorets

- Bulgarian First Professional League (6): 2012–13, 2013–14, 2014–15, 2015–16, 2016–17, 2019–20, 2020-21
- Bulgarian Cup: 2013–14
- Bulgarian Supercup: 2014

=== Individual ===
- Moldovan National Division Goalkeeper of the Year: 2010
- A Group Goalkeeper of the season: 2012–13, 2013–14
- Best XI Goalkeeper in the 2013–14 UEFA Europa League group stage
- Bulgarian Footballer of the Year: 2014
- Lionheart Award Trifon Ivanov: 2019
