= Darwin Ríos =

Bolivian footballer (born 1991)

Personal information
- Full name: Darwin Ríos Pinto
- Date of birth: 25 April 1991 (age 35)
- Place of birth: La Bélgica, Bolivia
- Position: Striker

Team information
- Current team: Aurora

Senior career*
Years	Team	Apps	(Gls)
2010–2012	Guabirá	30	(10)
2012	→ Sheriff Tiraspol (loan)	14	(3)
2012	→ Blooming (loan)	16	(3)
2013–2017	Guabirá		
2018	Royal Pari	16	(2)
2019–	Aurora	34	(4)

International career
2011–2012	Bolivia	2	(0)
- * Club domestic league appearances and goals as of 16:28, 19 September 2020 (UTC)

Darwin Ríos Pinto (born 25 April 1991) is a Bolivian international footballer who plays for Club Aurora, as a striker.

== Career ==
Born in La Bélgica, Ríos has played in Bolivia and Moldova for Guabirá, Sheriff Tiraspol and Blooming.

He made his international debut for Bolivia in 2011.
