= Artyom Khachaturov =

Armenian-Moldovan footballer (born 1992)

Personal information
- Full name: Artyom Khachaturov
- Date of birth: 18 June 1992 (age 34)
- Place of birth: Bender, Moldova
- Height: 1.90 m (6 ft 3 in)
- Position: Centre back

Youth career
- Sheriff Tiraspol

Senior career*
Years	Team	Apps	(Gls)
2009–2014	Sheriff Tiraspol	77	(1)
2013–2014	→ Tiraspol (loan)	25	(2)
2015	Zimbru Chișinău	8	(1)
2015	Kyzylzhar	11	(2)
2016	Ararat Yerevan	0	(0)
2016–2017	Zaria Bălți	8	(0)
2017	Zimbru Chișinău	15	(0)
2018–2019	Lori	38	(1)
2020–2021	Florești	16	(0)
2021	Sevan	13	(0)

International career^{‡}
2009–2011	Moldova U19 (Note: Only official UEFA matches included)	8	(0)
2010–2012	Moldova U21	7	(2)
2013–	Armenia	4	(0)
- * Club domestic league appearances and goals as of 14:42, 4 July 2021 (UTC) ‡ National team caps and goals as of 8 April 2019

Artyom Khachaturov (Armenian: Արտյոմ Խաչատուրով, Russian: Артем Хачатуров, Romanian: Artiom Haceaturov, born 18 June 1992) is an Armenian-Moldovan football player who plays as a defender.

== Career ==
=== Club ===
Khachaturov debuted for Sheriff Tiraspol. While at Sheriff, the club has won the 2009–10 and 2011–12 Moldovan National Division and the 2009–10 Moldovan Cup.

In January 2016, Khachaturov joined Armenian Premier League side Ararat Yerevan, but his contract was cancelled on 8 February of the same year.

In March 2018, Khachaturov signed for Armenian First League club Lori FC. After achieving winning the 2017-18 Armenian First League and achieving promotion to the Armenian Premier League, Khachaturov earned captaincy to the team.

=== International ===
Khachaturov joined the Armenia national football team. Beforehand there were issues of his citizenship documents. On 25 January 2013, the Armenian Football Federation announced it received an official letter from FIFA, which states that Khachaturov now has the right to play for the national team. He was quoted as saying his dream has come true and that, "I'm coming home... " Khachaturov made his debut for the Armenia national team on 5 February 2013, in Valence, France in a match against Luxembourg.

After a 5-year absence from National Team action, Khachaturov returned to the senior squad under coach Armen Gyulbudaghyants, being called up for 2018 UEFA Nations League October and November camps, playing two full games in the 4–0 victory over Macedonia and a 2–2 draw against Liechtenstein. The Macedonia game ended up being one of the biggest wins for the Armenia national team in the last years.

== Career statistics ==
=== Club ===
As of match played 5 October 2019

Appearances and goals by club, season and competition
Club	Season	League			National Cup		Total	
Club	Season	Division	Apps	Goals	Apps	Goals	Apps	Goals
Lori	2017–18	Armenian First League	9	1	-		9	1
Lori	2018–19	Armenian Premier League	26	1	3	0	29	1
Lori	2019–20	Armenian Premier League	3	0	0	0	3	0
Lori	Total		38	1	3	0	41	1
Career total			38	1	3	0	41	1

=== International ===
Armenia national team
Year	Apps	Goals
2013	2	0
2014	0	0
2015	0	0
2016	0	0
2017	0	0
2018	2	0
Total	4	0

Statistics accurate as of match played 19 November 2019

== Honours ==
=== Club ===
Sheriff Tiraspol

- Moldovan National Division (3): 2009–10, 2011–12, 2012–13
- Moldovan Cup (1): 2009–10

FC Lori

- Armenian First League (1): 2017-18
