= FC Milsami Orhei =

Association football club in Moldova

Milsami Orhei
- Full name: Fotbal Club Milsami Orhei
- Nickname: Vulturii roșii (The Red Eagles)
- Founded: 2005; 21 years ago as Viitorul Step-Soci
- Ground: CSR Orhei
- Capacity: 3,000
- President: Ilan Shor
- Head coach: Veaceslav Rusnac
- League: Liga
- 2025–26: Liga, 4th of 8
- Website: milsami.com
Home colours	Away colours

Fotbal Club Milsami Orhei, commonly known as Milsami Orhei or simply Milsami, is a Moldovan professional football club based in Orhei, Moldova, currently playing in the Moldovan Liga, the top tier of Moldovan football.

Previously known as FC Viitorul Orhei, it won its first league title in 2015, becoming the first team to take the title away from the cities of Chișinău and Tiraspol.

The club plays its home matches at the CSR Orhei, which has a capacity of 3.000 spectators.

== History ==
2005 – founded as Viitorul Step-Soci
2008 – renamed Viitorul Orhei
2010 – renamed Milsami Orhei
2011 – renamed Milsami-Ursidos Orhei
2012 – renamed Milsami Orhei

== Players ==
As of 21 March 2026

Note: Flags indicate national team as defined under FIFA eligibility rules; some limited exceptions apply. Players may hold more than one non-FIFA nationality.

No.	Pos.	Nation	Player
2	DF	MDA	Veaceslav Posmac
3	DF	BUL	Aleksandar Angelov
4	DF	BEL	William Simba
6	DF	MDA	Ion Ghimp
8	MF	BEL	Olivier Rommens
10	MF	MDA	Radu Gînsari (captain)
11	MF	MDA	Sorin Chele
13	MF	MDA	Vasile Luchița
14	MF	NGR	Philip Odubia

No.	Pos.	Nation	Player
15	MF	MDA	David Sîrbu
17	MF	MDA	Leonard Bulmaga
20	FW	BRA	Igor Souza
21	MF	SWE	Samouil Izountouemoi
24	DF	NED	Dehninio Muringen
29	DF	ERI	Hennos Asmelash
30	DF	GHA	Frederick Takyi
31	GK	BIH	Filip Dujmović
35	GK	MDA	Denis Vornic

== Honours ==
=== League ===
- Divizia Națională / Super Liga
  - Winners (2): 2014–15, 2024–25
  - Runners-up (2): 2017, 2018
- Divizia A (level 2)
  - Winners (1): 2008–09

=== Cup ===
- Cupa Moldovei
  - Winners (2): 2011–12, 2017–18
  - Runners-up (2): 2015–16, 2024–25
- Supercupa Moldovei
  - Winners (2): 2012, 2019
  - Runners-up (1): 2015

== League history ==
Season	Division	Pos	Pld	W	D	L	GF	GA	Pts	Cup	Super Cup	Europe		Top scorer (league)
2005–06	3rd	4th	20	11	4	5	34	18	37	—	—	—		
2006–07	3rd	3rd	18	9	7	2	38	15	34	—	—	—		
2007–08	2nd	7th	32	15	4	13	61	45	49	—	—	—		
2008–09	2nd	1st	30	20	3	7	59	36	63	First round	—	—		
2009–10	1st	8th	33	10	6	17	32	45	36	Second round	—	—		(Moldova) Alexandru Maximov (13)
2010–11	1st	3rd	39	23	9	7	71	23	78	Round of 16	—	—		(Moldova) Gheorghe Boghiu (26)
2011–12	1st	4th	33	14	5	14	41	37	47	Winners	—	UEL	1Q	(Brazil) Ademar (7)
2012–13	1st	4th	32	17	4	11	47	30	55	Semi-finals	Winners	UEL	2Q	(Moldova) Gheorghe Boghiu (16)
2013–14	1st	6th	33	17	5	11	54	32	56	Semi-finals	—	UEL	3Q	(Moldova) Gheorghe Boghiu (13)
2014–15	1st	1st	24	17	4	3	50	15	55	Semi-finals	—	—		(Romania) Romeo Surdu (12)
2015–16	1st	6th	27	10	6	11	33	23	36	Runners-up	Runners-up	UEL	PO	(Romania) Romeo Surdu (4)
2016–17	1st	3rd	30	22	2	6	57	20	68	Quarter-finals	—	—		(Russia) Ilya Belous (7) (Croatia) Igor Banović (7)
2017	1st	2nd	18	13	1	4	26	12	40	Winners	—	UEL	1Q	(Moldova) Constantin Bogdan (4) (Moldova) Alexandru Dedov (4)
2018	1st	2nd	28	13	6	9	36	24	45	Semi-finals	—	UEL	1Q	(Moldova) Mihai Plătică (7) (Moldova) Alexandru Antoniuc (7)
2019	1st	5th	28	10	9	9	30	28	39	Quarter-finals	Winners	UEL	1Q	(Moldova) Alexandru Antoniuc (5)
2020–21	1st	3rd	36	22	7	7	71	37	73	Quarter-finals	—	—		(Moldova) Alexandru Antoniuc (15)
2021–22	1st	3rd	28	15	6	7	50	31	51	Semi-finals	—	UECL	2Q	(Moldova) Sergiu Istrati (15)
2022–23	1st	4th	24	7	7	10	22	30	28	Quarter-finals	—	UECL	2Q	(Moldova) Radu Gînsari (6)
2023–24	1st	4th	24	11	5	8	31	26	38	Quarter-finals	—	UECL	1Q	(Moldova) Radu Gînsari (13)
2024–25	1st	1st	24	12	6	6	55	26	42	Runners-up	—	UECL	2Q	(Moldova) Radu Gînsari (9)
2025–26	4th	31	13	7	11	47	38	56	Semi-finals	—	UECL	2Q	(Moldova) Radu Gînsari (9)	

== European record ==
As of match played on 16 July 2026

Competition	Played	Won	Drew	Lost	GF	GA	GD	Win%
UEFA Champions League	6	2	1	3	3	6	−3	33.33
UEFA Europa League	18	2	5	11	14	36	−22	11.11
UEFA Conference League	20	5	8	7	19	30	−11	25.00
Total	44	9	14	21	36	72	−36	20.45

Legend: GF = Goals For. GA = Goals Against. GD = Goal Difference.

Season	Competition	Round	Club	Home	Away	Aggregate
2011–12	UEFA Europa League	1Q	(Georgia (country)) Dinamo Tbilisi	1–3	0–2	1–5
2012–13	UEFA Europa League	2Q	(Kazakhstan) Aktobe	4–2	0–3	4–5
2013–14	UEFA Europa League	1Q	(Luxembourg) F91 Dudelange	1–0	0–0	1–0
2013–14	UEFA Europa League	2Q	(Belarus) Shakhtyor Soligorsk	1–1 (a.e.t)	1–1	2–2 (4–2 pen.)
2013–14	UEFA Europa League	3Q	(France) Saint-Étienne	0–3	0–3	0–6
2015–16	UEFA Champions League	2Q	(Bulgaria) Ludogorets Razgrad	2–1	1–0	3–1
2015–16	UEFA Champions League	3Q	(Albania) Skënderbeu	0–2	0–2	0–4
2015–16	UEFA Europa League	PO	(France) Saint-Étienne	1–1	0–1	1–2
2017–18	UEFA Europa League	1Q	(Luxembourg) Fola Esch	1–1	1–2	2–3
2018–19	UEFA Europa League	1Q	(Slovakia) Slovan Bratislava	2−4	0–5	2–9
2019–20	UEFA Europa League	1Q	(Romania) FCSB	1–2	0–2	1–4
2021–22	UEFA Europa Conference League	1Q	(Bosnia and Herzegovina) Sarajevo	0–0	1–0	1–0
2021–22	UEFA Europa Conference League	2Q	(Sweden) Elfsborg	0–5	0–4	0–9
2022–23	UEFA Europa Conference League	1Q	(Lithuania) Panevėžys	2–0	0–0	2–0
2022–23	UEFA Europa Conference League	2Q	(Finland) KuPS	1–4	2–2	3−6
2023–24	UEFA Europa Conference League	1Q	(Lithuania) Panevėžys	0–1	2–2	2–3
2024–25	UEFA Conference League	1Q	(Belarus) Torpedo-BelAZ Zhodino	0–0	4–2	4–2
2024–25	UEFA Conference League	2Q	(Kazakhstan) Astana	1–1	0–1	1–2
2025–26	UEFA Champions League	1Q	(Finland) KuPS	0–0	0–1	0−1
2025–26	UEFA Conference League	2Q	(Montenegro) Budućnost Podgorica	2–1	0–0	2–1
2025–26	UEFA Conference League	3Q	(San Marino) Virtus	3–2	0–3	3−5
2026–27	UEFA Conference League	1Q	(Bosnia and Herzegovina) Velež Mostar	0–1	1–1	1−2
