= 2011–12 FC Dacia season =

FC Dacia Chişinău
2011–12 season
- Manager: (Russia) Igor Dobrovolski (until 6 May 2012) (Moldova) Igor Negrescu (acting)
- Moldovan National Division: 2.
- Moldovan Cup: Semifinals
- Moldovan Super Cup: Winner
- UEFA Champions League: Second Qualifying round
- Top goalscorer: League: (Russia) Vasili Pavlov (12); All: (Russia) Vasili Pavlov (13) (Moldova) Ghenadie Orbu (13)
- Highest home attendance: 4,000 v (Georgia (country)) Zestaponi (20 July 2011)
- Lowest home attendance: 150 v (Moldova) Iskra-Stal (29 November 2011)

2011–12 season is the 10th Moldovan National Division season in the history of FC Dacia Chisinau.

== Competitive games ==
Win Draw Loss

=== Friendlies ===
==== Pre-season / First Half Season ====
16 June 2011	Dacia (Moldova)	2–2	(Montenegro) Zeta	Chişinău, Moldova
19:30 EEST	Pavlov	Report	Ćetković; Korać	Stadium: Zimbru Stadium

22 June 2011	Dacia (Moldova)	2–0	(Moldova) Sfîntul Gheorghe	Chişinău, Moldova
	Mihaliov; Molla	Report		Stadium: Zimbru Stadium

26 June 2011	Dacia (Moldova)	4–0	(Moldova) Zimbru	Chişinău, Moldova
	Mihaliov; Orbu,	Report (in Romanian)		Stadium: Zimbru Stadium

1 July 2011	Dacia (Moldova)	2–2	(Bulgaria) Cherno More	Chişinău, Moldova
20:00 EEST	Orbu 51' (pen.); 61'	Report; Report (in Bulgarian)	Bozhilov 9'; Palomino 86'	Stadium: Zimbru Stadium; Attendance: 4000

5 September 2011	CSKA Moscow (Russia)	1–1	(Moldova) Dacia	Vatutinki, Russia
17:00 MSK	Vágner 47'	Report (in Russian)	Mihaliov 28' (pen.)	Stadium: Sport Training Base PFC CSKA

12 November 2011	Dacia (Moldova)	2–1	(Romania) Dinamo	Chişinău, Moldova
17:45 EEST	Dedov 21'; Orbu 89' (pen.)	Report	Stănescu 90'	Stadium: Zimbru Stadium; Attendance: 3000; Referee: (Moldova) Ghennadii Sidenco

==== Mid-season / Second Half Season ====
31 January 2012	SV Ried (Austria)	0–1	(Moldova) Dacia	Belek, Turkey
15:15 EEST		Report (in Russian)	Mihaliov 87'	Stadium: Cornelia Sports Center

2 February 2012	Dacia (Moldova)	0–1	(Czech Republic) Baumit Jablonec	Belek, Turkey
15:30 EEST		Report (in Russian)	Jardan 80' (o.g.)	Stadium: Spice Hotel & SPA Stadium

4 February 2012	Dacia (Moldova)	0–1	(Russia) FC Krasnodar	Belek, Turkey
15:00 EEST		Report (in Russian); Report (in Russian)	Amisulashvili 35'	Stadium: Cornelia Sports Center; Attendance: 50; Referee: (Poland) Tomasz Kwiatkowski

6 February 2012	BATE Borisov (Belarus)	3–2	(Moldova) Dacia	Belek, Turkey
17:00 EEST	Skavysh 6'; Maycon 74' (pen.); Baha 81'	Report (in Russian)	Célio 54'; Popovici 77'	Stadium: Cornelia Sports Center

8 February 2012	Dacia (Moldova)	1–1	(Montenegro) Zeta	Belek, Turkey
12:00 EEST	Sokol 28'	Report (in Romanian)	Došljak 29'	Stadium: Spice Hotel & SPA Stadium

11 February 2012	Dacia (Moldova)	2–1	(Hungary) Győri ETO FC	Belek, Turkey
15:00 EEST	Danso 18', 56'	Report (in Russian)	Koltai 1'	Stadium: Arcadia Sports Center

13 February 2012	Dacia (Moldova)	1–3	(Montenegro) Rudar	Belek, Turkey
15:30 EEST	Guira 15'	Report (in Russian)	Vlahović 25'; Jovanović 74'; Useni 85'	Stadium: Spice Hotel & SPA Stadium

15 February 2012	Brøndby IF (Denmark)	3–3	(Moldova) Dacia	Antalya, Turkey
15:00 EEST	Makienok 65'; Thygesen 72'; Agger 83'	Report (in Russian); Report (in Danish)	Tumbasević 59'; Sow 62'; Mihaliov 86'	Stadium: Rixos Lares Hotel Stadium

17 February 2012	Volyn Lutsk (Ukraine)	4–3	(Moldova) Dacia	Belek, Turkey
18:30 EEST	Pyschur 28' (pen.); Savić 31'; Lopes 70'; Pylypchuk 80'	Report (in Russian)	Pavlov 16'; Mihaliov 33', 73'	Stadium: Arcadia Sports Center

=== Super Cup ===
8 July 2011 Final	Iskra-Stal	0–1	Dacia	Tiraspol, Moldova
19:00 EEST	Porfireanu (yellow card) 75'	Report	Pavlov 12'; Atanacković (yellow card) 62'; Ilescu (yellow card) 70'	Stadium: Malaya Sportivnaya Arena; Attendance: 1500; Referee: (Moldova) Ghennadii Sidenco

=== National Division ===
==== Matches ====
24 July 2011 1	Dacia	1–0	Nistru	Chişinău, Moldova
20:00 EEST	Mamah (yellow card) 30'; Onica (yellow card) 60'; Orbu 78'; Ilescu (yellow card) 90'	Report	Marin (yellow card) 34'	Stadium: Zimbru Stadium; Attendance: 300; Referee: (Moldova) Igor Șațchii

30 July 2011 2	CSCA – Rapid	1–2	Dacia	Ghidighici, Moldova
18:00 EEST	Clonin (yellow card) 29'; Leu (yellow card) 54'; Josan 83'	Report	Tumbasević (yellow card) 29'; Cojocari (yellow card) 37'; Ilescu (yellow card) 63'; Krkotić 69'; Stjepanović 81'	Stadium: Ghidighici Stadium; Attendance: 500; Referee: (Moldova) Gabriel Tupicico

6 August 2011 3	Dacia	1–1	FC Tiraspol	Chişinău, Moldova
18:00 EEST	Orbu 31'	Report	Grosu Sr. 38', (yellow card) 90+1'; Nicologlo (yellow card) 72'; Georgiev (yellow card) 86'	Stadium: Zimbru Stadium; Attendance: 800; Referee: (Moldova) Gheorghe Malinovschi

14 August 2011 4	Zimbru	3–1	Dacia	Chişinău, Moldova
18:00 EEST	Šuster 14'; Şişchin 49' (pen.); Bălaşa (yellow card) 80'; Catan 87'	Report	Orbu 80'; Ilescu (yellow card) 84'	Stadium: Zimbru Stadium; Attendance: 2000; Referee: (Moldova) Veaceslav Banari

20 August 2011 5	Dacia	2–0	Sfîntul Gheorghe	Chişinău, Moldova
20:00 EEST	Dimovski (yellow card) 72'; Mamah (yellow card) 77'; Pavlov 83', (yellow card) 90'; Onica (yellow card) 85'; Stjepanović 87'	Report	Turcan (yellow card) 79'	Stadium: Zimbru Stadium; Attendance: 500; Referee: (Moldova) Iurie Rochin

27 August 2011 6	Iskra-Stal	1–4	Dacia	Rîbnița, Moldova
17:00 EEST	Kourouma (yellow card) 25'; Novicov (yellow card) 37'; Antoniuc 68'	Report	Ilescu (yellow card) 27'; Mihaliov 48' (pen.), 59'; Onica (yellow card) 76'; Krkotić 87'; Bobal 90+1'; De Araujo (yellow card) 90+3'	Stadium: Orăşenesc; Attendance: 2000; Referee: (Moldova) Igor Șațchii

10 September 2011 7	Dacia	3–1	Olimpia	Chişinău, Moldova
19:00 EEST	Pavlov 10', 84'; Célio (yellow card) 12', (goal) 86'; Nechayev (yellow card) 42'; Dedov (yellow card) 90'	Report	Mincev (yellow card) 8'; Ovseannicov 46'; Kamara (yellow card) 74'	Stadium: Zimbru Stadium; Attendance: 1000; Referee: (Moldova) Piotr Stoianov

17 September 2011 8	Sheriff	0–0	Dacia	Tiraspol, Moldova
18:00 EEST	Balima (yellow card) 42'; Rouamba (yellow card) 68'; Zamaliyev (yellow card) 90+1'	Report	Popovici (yellow card) 51'	Stadium: Sheriff Stadium; Attendance: 3000; Referee: (Moldova) Victor Gheciu

21 September 2011 9	Dacia	1–0	FC Costuleni	Chişinău, Moldova
19:00 EEST	Célio 29'; Mamah (yellow card) 56'; Cojocari (yellow card) 88'	Report	Dima (yellow card) 26'	Stadium: Zimbru Stadium; Attendance: 300; Referee: (Moldova) Iurie Covtun

25 September 2011 10	Dacia	2–0	Milsami-Ursidos	Chişinău, Moldova
19:00 EEST	Pavlov 27', (yellow card) 59'; Orbu (yellow card) 31'; Krkotić (yellow card) 45+2'; Cojocari (yellow card) 53'; Mihaliov 89' (pen.)	Report	Golban (yellow card) 5'; Ademar (yellow card) 45'; Mendizov (yellow card) 62'; Ochincă (yellow card) 88'; Roman (yellow card) 90+1'	Stadium: Zimbru Stadium; Attendance: 700; Referee: (Moldova) Ghennadii Sidenco

1 October 2011 11	Academia UTM	0–3	Dacia	Chişinău, Moldova
15:00 EEST	Lambarschi (yellow card) 40'; Bugneac (yellow card) 53'; Plătică (yellow card) 76'; Potlog (yellow card) 86'	Report	Onica (yellow card) 19'; Pavlov 30', (yellow card) 42'; Orbu (yellow card) 51'; Mihaliov 56', 90+3'; Alomerović (yellow card) 87'	Stadium: CST UTM; Attendance: 500; Referee: (Moldova) Ghenadie Crasnoșan

15 October 2011 12	Nistru	1–3	Dacia	Călărăşăuca, Moldova
15:00 EEST	Lichioiu 40'; Marin (yellow card) 43'; Tcaciuc (yellow card) 51'; Sopho (yellow card) 56'; Murgulet (yellow card) 75'	Report	Pavlov 14'; Orbu 26'; Nechayev 56', (yellow card) 81'	Stadium: Sătesc; Attendance: 300; Referee: (Moldova) Gheorghe Malinovschi

22 October 2011 13	Dacia	3–0	CSCA – Rapid	Chişinău, Moldova
17:00 EEST	Onica (yellow card) 12'; Pavlov 38'; Célio 78'; Bobal 90+2'	Report	Leu (yellow card) 27'; Călin (yellow card) 42'	Stadium: Zimbru Stadium; Attendance: 500; Referee: (Moldova) Victor Gheciu

30 October 2011 14	FC Tiraspol	0–2	Dacia	Tiraspol, Moldova
17:00 EEST	Nicologlo 79'	Report	Krkotić 15'; Mamah (yellow card) 52'; Onica (yellow card) 63'; Tumbasević 90+1'	Stadium: Sheriff Stadium; Attendance: 400; Referee: (Moldova) Gabriel Tupicico

5 November 2011 15	Dacia	2–0	Zimbru	Chişinău, Moldova
14:00 EEST	Pavlov 17', (yellow card) 18'; Cojocari (yellow card) 38'; Bobal 55'	Report		Stadium: Stadionul CPTF Zimbru; Attendance: 500; Referee: (Moldova) Dumitru Muntean

19 November 2011 16	Sfîntul Gheorghe	0–6	Dacia	Chişinău, Moldova
13:00 EEST	Grosu (red card) 71'	Report	Alomerović 5', (yellow card) 59'; Orbu 23', 38'; Mihaliov (yellow card) 33', (goal) 45'; Nechayev 62', (yellow card) 70', (goal) 82'	Stadium: Buiucani; Attendance: 200; Referee: (Moldova) Iurie Covtun

29 November 2011 17	Dacia	1–2	Iskra-Stal	Chişinău, Moldova
13:00 EEST	Onica (yellow card) 37'; Mihaliov 82' (pen.)	Report	Iavorschi 35', 50'; Ponomar (yellow card) 45+2' (yellow-red card) 57'; Cebotari (yellow card) 82'	Stadium: Stadionul CPTF Zimbru; Attendance: 150; Referee: (Moldova) Gheorghe Malinovschi

3 March 2012 18	Olimpia	0–1	Dacia	Bălți, Moldova
13:00 EEST	Ogada (yellow card) 86'	Report	Tumbasević (yellow card) 56'; Orbu 80'	Stadium: Olimpia (artificial); Attendance: 1000; Referee: (Moldova) Gabriel Tupicico

10 March 2012 19	Dacia	0–0	Sheriff	Chişinău, Moldova
14:00 EEST	Ilescu (yellow card) 31'; Mihaliov (yellow card) 36'	Report	Onica (yellow card) 36'; Rouamba (yellow card) 65'	Stadium: Stadionul CPTF Zimbru; Attendance: 2000; Referee: (Germany) Günter Perl

17 March 2012 20	FC Costuleni	0–1	Dacia	Chişinău, Moldova
14:00 EEST	Kolev (yellow card) 40'; Mardari (yellow card) 54'; Gramatikov (yellow card) 72'; Onofrei (yellow card) 80'	Report	Mihaliov 74' (pen.); Guira (yellow card) 75' (yellow-red card) 85'; Pavlov (yellow card) 81'	Stadium: Buiucani; Attendance: 500; Referee: (Moldova) Ghennadii Sidenco

21 March 2012 21	Milsami-Ursidos	0–1	Dacia	Vadul lui Vodă, Moldova
12:00 EEST		Report	Sow (yellow card) 35'; Pavlov 57'; Cojocari (yellow card) 77'	Stadium: CPS FMF; Attendance: 400; Referee: (Moldova) Victor Gheciu

25 March 2012 22	Dacia	3–1	Academia UTM	Chişinău, Moldova
15:00 EEST	Pavlov 3', 69'; Mamah (yellow card) 44'; Berbinschi 66' (o.g.)	Report	Lyubushkin 21'; Istrati (yellow card) 41'	Stadium: Stadionul CPTF Zimbru; Attendance: 400; Referee: (Moldova) Ghennadii Sidenco

30 March 2012 23	Dacia	3–0	Academia UTM	Chişinău, Moldova
15:30 EEST	Guira 16'; Krkotić 35'; Célio (yellow card) 40'; Platica 58' (o.g.); Orbu (yellow card) 90'; Popovici (yellow card) 90+2'	Report	Livandovschi (yellow card) 46'; Gînsari (yellow card) 70'	Stadium: Stadionul CPTF Zimbru; Attendance: 400; Referee: (Moldova) Serghei Derenov

2 April 2012 24	Sheriff	0–0	Dacia	Tiraspol, Moldova
18:00 EEST	Rouamba (yellow card) 62'; Samardžić (yellow card) 68'	Report	Guira (yellow card) 57'; Cojocari (yellow card) 65'	Stadium: Krytyj futbolnyj Manesh; Attendance: 3000; Referee: (Moldova) Igor Șațchii

6 April 2012 25	Dacia	3–0	FC Costuleni	Chişinău, Moldova
15:30 EEST	Krkotić 8', 52'; Guira 68'; Ilescu (yellow card) 90'	Report	Trofin (yellow card) 37'; Sandu (yellow card) 70'	Stadium: Stadionul CPTF Zimbru; Attendance: 250; Referee: (Moldova) Gheorghe Malinovschi

14 April 2012 26	Dacia	4–0	Zimbru	Chişinău, Moldova
15:00 EEST	Mihaliov 40'; Orbu 49'; Cărăuş 52', (yellow card) 56'; Sow 72'	Report	Zastavnyi (yellow card) 58'	Stadium: Stadionul CPTF Zimbru; Attendance: 300; Referee: (Moldova) Dumitru Muntean

21 April 2012 27	Iskra-Stal	0–2	Dacia	Rîbnița, Moldova
16:00 EEST	Scripcenco (yellow card) 49'	Report	Orbu 51', 85'	Stadium: Orăşenesc; Attendance: 1000; Referee: (Moldova) Gabriel Tupicico

27 April 2012 28	Dacia	2–1	Milsami-Ursidos	Chişinău, Moldova
16:00 EEST	Pavlov 28', (yellow card) 57'; Grosu (yellow card) 43'; Krkotić 46'	Report	Ciofu 27'; Mohammed (yellow card) 48'	Stadium: Stadionul CPTF Zimbru; Attendance: 500; Referee: (Moldova) Victor Gheciu

1 May 2012 29	Olimpia	1–0	Dacia	Bălți, Moldova
19:00 EEST	Kuba 22'; Jerome (yellow card) 69'; Hovanschii (yellow card) 90'; Ogada (yellow card) 90+2'	Report	Cojocari (yellow card) 45+2'	Stadium: Orăşenesc; Attendance: 2000; Referee: (Moldova) Iurie Covtun

6 May 2012 30	Dacia	0–0	FC Tiraspol	Chişinău, Moldova
17:00 EEST		Report	Grosu Sr. (yellow card) 86'; Yemelyanov (yellow card) 90'	Stadium: Zimbru Stadium; Attendance: 500; Referee: (Moldova) Ghenadie Sidenco

10 May 2012 31	Nistru	1–3	Dacia	Călărăşăuca, Moldova
17:00 EEST	Sopho (yellow card) 23'; Ershov (yellow card) 78'; Banari 90'; Vîlcu (yellow card) 90'	Report	Mihaliov 7', 24'; Cojocari (yellow card) 25'; Cărăuş (yellow card) 67'; Krkotić 69'	Stadium: Călărăşăuca Stadium; Attendance: 200; Referee: (Moldova) Igor Șațchii

18 May 2012 32	Dacia	2–0	CSCA – Rapid	Chişinău, Moldova
17:00	Ilescu (yellow card) 15'; Orbu 31'; Guira 90+2'	Report	Mădălin Vasile Militaru (yellow card) 6'	Stadium: Zimbru Stadium; Attendance: 500; Referee: Victor Gheciu

23 May 2012 33	Sfîntul Gheorghe	3–1	Dacia	Suruceni, Moldova
17:00	Yerchyk 27' (pen.); Ion Ursu 75'; Alexandr Răilean 85'	Report	Popovici (yellow card) 26'; Cojocari 29'	Stadium: Suruceni Stadium; Attendance: 100; Referee: Ruslan Muntean

==== League table ====
Pos	Team	Pld	W	D	L	GF	GA	GD	Pts	Qualification or relegation
1	Sheriff Tiraspol (C)	33	25	6	2	75	18	+57	81	Qualification for the Champions League second qualifying round
2	Dacia Chișinău	33	24	5	4	63	17	+46	77	Qualification for the Europa League first qualifying round
3	Zimbru Chișinău	33	17	10	6	47	24	+23	61	Qualification for the Europa League first qualifying round
4	Milsami Orhei	33	14	5	14	41	37	+4	47	Qualification for the Europa League second qualifying round (Note: Milsami Orhei won the 2011–12 Moldovan Cup and therefore qualified for the second qualifying round of UEFA Europa League.)
5	Olimpia Bălți	33	10	15	8	26	27	−1	45	

Source: Moldovan Football Federation
Rules for classification: 1st points; 2nd head-to-head points; 3rd head-to-head goal difference; 4th head-to-head goals scored; 5th goal difference; 6th number of goals scored; 7th Fair Play competition
(C) Champions

==== Results summary ====
Overall								Home						Away					
Pld	W	D	L	GF	GA	GD	Pts	W	D	L	GF	GA	GD	W	D	L	GF	GA	GD
33	24	5	4	63	17	+46	77	13	3	1	33	6	+27	11	2	3	30	11	+19

Last updated: 23 May 2012.
Source: Moldovan Football Federation

==== Results by round ====
Round	1	2	3	4	5	6	7	8	9	10	11	12	13	14	15	16	17	18	19	20	21	22	23	24	25	26	27	28	29	30	31	32	33
Ground	H	A	H	A	H	A	H	A	H	H	A	A	H	A	H	A	H	A	H	A	A	H	H	A	H	H	A	H	A	H	A	H	A
Result	W	W	D	L	W	W	W	D	W	W	W	W	W	W	W	W	L	W	D	W	W	W	W	D	W	W	W	W	L	D	W	W	L
Position	5	3	3	5	3	2	2	2	2	2	2	2	2	2	2	2	2	2	2	2	2	2	2	2	1	1	1	1	2	2	2	2	2

Updated to match(es) played on 23 May 2012. Source: Matches
A = Away; H = Home; W = Win; D = Draw; L = Loss

=== Moldovan Cup ===
24 November 2011 Third round	Sfîntul Gheorghe	2–6	Dacia	Chişinău, Moldova
13:00 EEST	Răilean 29'; Mardari (yellow card) 40'; Cucu 83'	Report	Orbu 21' (pen.), 32'; Célio (yellow card) 26'; Alomerović (yellow card) 41'; Tumbasević (yellow card) 59'; Onica 60'; Mihaliov 74'; Bobal 79'; Krkotić 87'	Stadium: Buiucani; Attendance: 100; Referee: (Moldova) Viorel Gaina

10 April 2012 Quarterfinals	Dacia	1–0	FC Tiraspol	Chişinău, Moldova
13:00 EEST	Krkotić 49'; Guira (yellow card) 69'	Report	Costrov (yellow card) 59'	Stadium: Buiucani; Attendance: 300; Referee: (Moldova) Ghennadii Sidenco

14 May 2012 Semifinals	Milsami-Ursidos	5–4	Dacia	Orhei, Moldova
16:00 EEST	Rassulov 26'; Grigoruţă 31', 36'; Espinoza (yellow card) 69', (goal) 73', 77'	Report	Mihaliov 16', 86'; Cociuc 30'; Orbu 75'	Stadium: Complexul Sportiv Raional; Attendance: 2000; Referee: (Moldova) Gabriel Tupicico

=== UEFA Champions League ===
==== Second qualifying round ====
13 July 2011 First leg	Zestaponi (Georgia (country))	3–0	(Moldova) Dacia	Zestaponi, Georgia
18:00 CET	Gelashvili 14'; Dvali 23', 40'; Daushvili (yellow card) 24'	Report; Report	Cojocari (yellow card) 57'	Stadium: David Abashidze Stadium; Attendance: 4,458; Referee: (Turkey) Halis Özkahya

20 July 2011 Second leg	Dacia (Moldova)	2–0 (2–3 agg.)	(Georgia (country)) Zestaponi	Chişinău, Moldova
18:00 CET	Popovici 20'; Ilescu (yellow card) 50'; Orbu 90+2' (pen.)	Report; Report	Gongadze (yellow card) 59', (yellow card) 64' (red card); Oniani (yellow card) 90+2'	Stadium: Zimbru Stadium; Attendance: 4,000; Referee: (Slovenia) Matej Jug

== Playing statistics ==
Appearances (Apps.) numbers are for appearances in competitive games only.
Apps. numbers denote: "No. of games played (No. of games started / No. of games subbed on)"
Goal numbers are for goals during match time only and do not include goals from penalty shootouts.
Goal numbers denote: "No. of goals scored (No. of goals scored from penalty kick)"
If a player received two yellow cards in a match and was sent off the numbers count as two yellow cards, one red card.
Red card numbers denote: "No. of red cards (No. of second yellow cards / No. of straight red cards)"

No.	Pos.	Player name	National Division				Cup				Champions League				Super Cup				TOTALS All competitions			
No.	Pos.	Player name	Apps.		Yellow card	Red card	Apps.		Yellow card	Red card	Apps.		Yellow card	Red card	Apps.		Yellow card	Red card	Apps.		Yellow card	Red card
1	GK	(Moldova) Ustin Cerga					1 (1/0)															
4	DF	(Moldova) Denis Ilescu	27 (26/1)		6		1 (1/0)				1 (1/0)		1		1 (1/0)		1					
5	DF	(Moldova) Dumitru Popovici	19 (15/4)		2		2 (2/0)				1 (1/0)	1			1 (1/0)							
7	MF	(Burkina Faso) Adama Guira	11 (11/0)	2	3	1 (1/0)	1 (1/0)		1													
7	DF	(Moldova) Vasile Jardan	2 (1/1)				1 (1/0)															
8	DF	(Moldova) Eduard Grosu	5 (3/2)		1		1 (1/0)															
9	FW	(Moldova) Ghenadie Orbu	31 (11/20)	10	3		2 (2/0)	2 (1)			2 (1/1)	1 (1)			1 (1/0)							
10	MF	(Moldova) Nicolae Josan	5 (0/5)		1																	
11	MF	(Moldova) Maxim Mihaliov	30 (29/1)	11 (3)	2		2 (1/1)	1			2 (1/0)				1 (0/1)							
13	FW	(Sweden) Osman Sow	14 (7/7)	1	1		1 (0/1)															
14	FW	(Moldova) Vladimir Dragovozov	1 (0/1)																			
15	MF	(Moldova) Denis Calincov	4 (3/1)																			
18	FW	(Moldova) Pavel Secrier	1 (0/1)				1 (0/1)															
18	FW	(Moldova) Nicolae Nemerenco	1 (0/1)																			
20	MF	(Moldova) Vasile Cărăuş	9 (9/0)	1	1																	
21	FW	(Montenegro) Slaven Stjepanović	6 (6/0)	2							2 (2/0)											
22	DF	(Ukraine) Maksym Lapushenko	2 (2/0)																			
23	MF	(Montenegro) Janko Tumbasević	22 (10/12)	1	2		2 (1/1)		1		2 (2/0)											
25	DF	(Brazil) Célio dos Santos	25 (25/0)	3	2		2 (2/0)		1													
27	DF	(North Macedonia) Goran Dimovski	29 (28/1)		1		1 (1/0)				2 (2/0)											
30	GK	(Moldova) Artiom Gaiduchevici	17 (17/0)								2 (2/0)											
47	MF	(Moldova) Andrei Cojocari	27 (27/0)		8		1 (1/0)				2 (2/0)		1		1 (0/1)							
61	MF	(Montenegro) Miloš Krkotić	28 (22/6)	8	1		2 (1/1)	2			1 (0/1)				1 (1/0)							
65	FW	(Russia) Vasily Pavlov	26 (20/6)	12	6		1 (1/0)				1 (0/1)				1 (1/0)	1						
81	GK	(Moldova) Yevgeni Matyugin	16 (14/2)				1 (1/0)															
88	FW	(Ukraine) Matviy Bobal	7 (1/6)	3			1 (1/0)	1														
Players loaned from another club:
24	DF	(Togo) Abdoul-Gafar Mamah	26 (26/0)		5						2 (1/1)											
Players loaned to another club during the season:
1	GK	(Moldova) Ghenadie Moşneaga													1 (1/0)							
18	DF	(Moldova) Yuri Groshev													1 (1/0)							
19	FW	(Moldova) Oleg Molla													1 (1/0)							
Players who left the club during the season:
-	DF	(Romania) Lucian Dobre									1 (1/0)								1 (1/0)			
-	MF	(Portugal) Lopes De Araujo	7 (1/6)		1														7 (1/6)		1	
-	MF	(Moldova) Alexandru Onica	14 (13/1)		7		1 (0/1)	1			1 (1/0)								16 (14/2)	1	7	
-	MF	(North Macedonia) Kemal Alomerović	9 (2/7)	1	2		1 (1/0)		1						1 (1/0)				11 (4/7)	1	3	
-	DF	(Serbia) Branislav Atanacković	5 (5/0)				1 (1/0)				1 (1/0)				1 (1/0)		1		8 (8/0)		1	
-	FW	(Russia) Alexandr Nechayev	12 (1/11)	3	3		1 (1/0)				2 (1/1)				1 (1/0)				16 (4/12)	3	3	
-	MF	(Moldova) Iulian Bursuc	1 (0/1)												1 (1/0)				2 (1/1)			
-	MF	(Moldova) Alexandru Dedov	8 (7/1)		1						2 (1/1)								10 (8/2)	1		
-	DF	(Georgia (country)) David Gamezardashvili									1 (1/0)								1 (1/0)			
		OWN GOAL		2																		
TOTALS			31	60	59	1	2	7	4		2	2	2		1	1	2					
TOTALS					Yellow card	Red card			Yellow card	Red card			Yellow card	Red card			Yellow card	Red card			Yellow card	Red card

Key: Po. = Playing position; GK = Goalkeeper; DF = Defender; MF = Midfielder; FW = Forward;
Updated to games played on 1 May 2012, match vs Olimpia.

Source: (for players and positions) Season 2011–12 First Team Squad (for actual stats.) All match Reports in Competitive games section above (for players enumerated in UEFA squad) UEFA Champions League squad

== Transfers and loans ==
=== Pre-season window ===
Transfers in
Date	Pos.	No.	Player	From club	Transfer fee
2 Jul 2011	DF	19	Branislav Atanacković	FK Smederevo	Free
2 Jul 2011	DF	25	Célio dos Santos	Belenenses	Undisclosed
2 Jul 2011	MF	61	Miloš Krkotić	FK Zeta	Undisclosed
2 Jul 2011	MF	15	Kemal Alomerović	FK Shkëndija	Undisclosed
2 Jul 2011	MF	6	Lopes De Araujo	Esperança de Lagos	Undisclosed
2 Jul 2011	FW	65	Vasily Pavlov	Krylia Sovetov	Free agent
2 Jul 2011	FW	21	Slaven Stjepanović	AO Trikala	Free
2 Jul 2011	MF	23	Janko Tumbasević	FK Vojvodina	Undisclosed
1 Aug 2011	FW	1	Ustin Cerga	Sfîntul Gheorghe	Loan return
12 Aug 2011	FW	88	Matviy Bobal	FC Zakarpattia	Undisclosed

Transfers out
Date	Pos.	No.	Player	To club	Transfer fee
1 Jun 2011	FW	–	Islam Tsuroyev	Terek Grozny	Loan return
1 Jun 2011	FW	–	Babatunde Collins	Midtjylland	Loan return
1 Jun 2011	DF	–	Mamuka Lomidze	Released	
19 Jul 2011	DF	6	Lucian Dobre	Farul Constanţa	Released
3 Aug 2011	DF	25	David Gamezardashvili	Torpedo Kutaisi	Released
3 Aug 2011	MF	–	Levan Korgalidze	Released	
28 Sep 2011	FW	–	Vasili Guchashvili	Released	

Loans out
Start date	End date	Pos.	Player	To club
23 Jul 2011	1 Dec 2011	MF	Jude Okoye	Sfîntul Gheorghe
23 Jul 2011	1 Dec 2011	DF	Ştefan Caraulan	Sfîntul Gheorghe
23 Jul 2011	1 Dec 2011	DF	Kirill Erokhin	Sfîntul Gheorghe
23 Jul 2011	1 Dec 2011	FW	Erick Sakey	Sfîntul Gheorghe
23 Jul 2011	1 Dec 2011	GK	Ghenadie Moşneaga	Sfîntul Gheorghe
23 Jul 2011	1 Dec 2011	FW	Oleg Molla	Zimbru Chişinău
23 Jul 2011	1 Dec 2011	MF	Eugen Gorceac	Zimbru Chişinău
23 Jul 2011	1 Jun 2012	FW	Ruslan Kartoyev	Sfîntul Gheorghe

=== Mid-season window ===
Transfers in
Date	Pos.	No.	Player	From club	Transfer fee
5 Dec 2011	GK	–	Dorin Railean	Dacia-2 Buiucani	Free (Farm team)
5 Dec 2011	MF	–	Eugeniu Cociuc	Dacia-2 Buiucani	Free (Farm team)
5 Dec 2011	DF	–	Vasile Jardan	Dacia-2 Buiucani	Free (Farm team)
5 Dec 2011	FW	18	Pavel Secrier	Dacia-2 Buiucani	Free (Farm team)
7 Dec 2011	MF	–	Petru Postoroncă	Dacia-2 Buiucani	Free (Farm team)
5 Feb 2012	MF	10	Nicolae Josan	Free agent	
7 Feb 2012	MF	15	Denis Calincov	Free agent	
21 Feb 2012	MF	7	Adama Guira	Djurgårdens IF	Free agent
23 Feb 2012	FW	13	Osman Sow	Väsby United	Free
29 Feb 2012	DF	22	Maksym Lapushenko	Dynamo Kyiv II	Free agent
1 Mar 2012	MF	20	Vasile Cărăuş	Metalurh Zaporizhya	Undisclosed
1 Mar 2012	DF	8	Eduard Grosu	Sfîntul Gheorghe	Undisclosed

Transfers out
Date	Pos.	No.	Player	To club	Transfer fee
25 Oct 2011	MF	20	Iulian Bursuc	Unattached	Retired
30 Nov 2011	FW	22	Alexandru Dedov	Sheriff Tiraspol	Free agent
1 Dec 2011	FW	17	Alexandr Nechayev	Released	
1 Dec 2011	MF	15	Kemal Alomerović	FK Shkëndija	Released
1 Dec 2011	MF	–	Jude Okoye	Released	
1 Dec 2011	DF	–	Ştefan Caraulan	Academia UTM	Free agent
31 Dec 2011	MF	7	Alexandru Onica	Vorskla Poltava	Loan return
12 Jan 2012	DF	19	Branislav Atanacković	Borac Čačak	Undisclosed
31 Jan 2012	MF	6	Lopes De Araujo	Olhanense	Undisclosed

Loans out
Start date	End date	Pos.	Player	To club
1 Jan 2012	31 Dec 2012	FW	Oleg Molla	Zimbru Chişinău
1 Jan 2012	1 Jun 2012	DF	Kirill Erokhin	Zimbru Chişinău
1 Jan 2012	1 Jun 2012	FW	Erick Sakey	Zimbru Chişinău
1 Jan 2012	1 Jun 2012	GK	Dorin Railean	Sfîntul Gheorghe
