= 2011–12 Moldovan National Division =

Moldovan National Division
- Season: 2011–12
- Champions: Sheriff Tiraspol
- Relegated: Sfîntul Gheorghe
- Champions League: Sheriff Tiraspol
- Europa League: Dacia Chișinău; Zimbru Chișinău; Milsami Orhei
- Matches: 198
- Goals: 453 (2.29 per match)
- Top goalscorer: Benjamin Balima (18 goals)
- Biggest home win: Sheriff 6–0 Olimpia
- Biggest away win: Sfîntul Gheorghe 0–6 Dacia
- Highest scoring: Academia 2–5 Milsami

The 2011–12 Moldovan National Division (Romanian: Divizia Națională) was the 21st season of top-tier football in Moldova. The competition began on 23 July 2011 and ended on 23 May 2012.

The league was competed by 12 teams and won by Sheriff Tiraspol. Dacia Chișinău, Zimbru Chișinău and, as winners of the 2011–12 Moldovan Cup, Milsami Orhei gained places in the qualification rounds of 2012–13 UEFA Europa League. CSCA–Rapid Chișinău and FC Costuleni were originally relegated on competitive grounds, but were both spared later after Sfintul Gheorghe Suruceni did not obtain a National Division licence for 2012–13 and only one team could be promoted from the 2011–12 A Division on the same grounds.

== Teams ==
The number of teams in the league was decreased from 14 to 12. Placed last in the previous season, Găgăuzia Comrat and Dinamo Bender had not completed their licensing to compete in the Moldovan National Division and were relegated. Neither could the first four placed teams in the 2010–11 Moldovan "A" Division: Locomotiv Bălți, Ursidos Chișinău, Dinamo-Auto and Intersport-Aroma, therefore no teams were promoted.

=== Stadia and locations ===
Location of teams in National Division 2011–12

Club	Location	Stadium	Capacity
Academia UTM Chișinău	Chișinău	CST UTM	2,888
Costuleni	Costuleni	CSR Orhei	2,539
CSCA–Rapid Chișinău	Ghidighici	Ghidighici Stadium	1,500
Dacia Chișinău	Chișinău	Zimbru Stadium	10,600
Iskra-Stal Rîbnița	Rîbnița	Orășenesc Stadium	4,500
Milsami Orhei	Orhei	CSR Orhei	2,539
Nistru Otaci	Otaci	Călărășeuca Stadium	2,000
Olimpia Bălț	Bălți	Olimpia Bălți Stadium	5,953
Sfîntul Gheorghe Suruceni	Suruceni	Suruceni Stadium	2,000
Sheriff Tiraspol	Tiraspol	Sheriff Stadium	13,460
FC Tiraspol	Tiraspol	Sheriff Stadium	13,460
Zimbru Chișinău	Chișinău	Zimbru Stadium	10,600

== League table ==
Pos	Team	Pld	W	D	L	GF	GA	GD	Pts	Qualification or relegation
1	Sheriff Tiraspol (C)	33	25	6	2	75	18	+57	81	Qualification for the Champions League second qualifying round
2	Dacia Chișinău	33	24	5	4	63	17	+46	77	Qualification for the Europa League first qualifying round
3	Zimbru Chișinău	33	17	10	6	47	24	+23	61	Qualification for the Europa League first qualifying round
4	Milsami Orhei	33	14	5	14	41	37	+4	47	Qualification for the Europa League second qualifying round (Note: Milsami Orhei won the 2011–12 Moldovan Cup and therefore qualified for the second qualifying round of UEFA Europa League.)
5	Olimpia Bălți	33	10	15	8	26	27	−1	45	
6	Tiraspol	33	10	12	11	36	32	+4	42	
7	Iskra - Stal Rîbniţa	33	11	7	15	41	48	−7	40	
8	Nistru Otaci	33	10	9	14	30	41	−11	39	
9	Academia Chișinău	33	6	13	14	32	48	−16	31	
10	Sfîntul Gheorghe (R)	33	7	9	17	23	55	−32	30	Relegation to Division "A" (Note: CSCA–Rapid Chișinău and FC Costuleni were originally relegated on competitive grounds, but were both spared later after Sfintul Gheorghe Suruceni did not obtain a National Division licence for 2012–13 and only one team could be promoted from the 2011–12 A Division on the same grounds.)
11	CSCA – Rapid Chişinău	33	6	8	19	20	52	−32	26	
12	Costuleni	33	3	11	19	19	54	−35	20	

Source: Moldovan Football Federation
Rules for classification: 1st points; 2nd head-to-head points; 3rd head-to-head goal difference; 4th head-to-head goals scored; 5th goal difference; 6th number of goals scored; 7th Fair Play competition
(C) Champions; (R) Relegated

=== Round by round ===
Team ╲ Round	1	2	3	4	5	6	7	8	9	10	11	12	13	14	15	16	17	18	19	20	21	22	23	24	25	26	27	28	29	30	31	32	33
Sheriff Tiraspol	2	2	1	1	1	1	1	1	1	1	1	1	1	1	1	1	1	1	1	1	1	1	1	1	2	2	2	2	1	1	1	1	1
Dacia Chișinău	5	3	3	5	3	2	2	2	2	2	2	2	2	2	2	2	2	2	2	2	2	2	2	2	1	1	1	1	2	2	2	2	2
Zimbru Chișinău	1	1	4	2	2	3	3	5	4	3	3	3	3	3	4	3	3	3	3	3	3	3	3	3	3	3	3	3	3	3	3	3	3
Milsami Orhei	3	7	5	4	4	4	5	4	5	6	5	4	5	5	3	4	5	4	4	5	5	5	5	5	5	5	5	5	4	4	4	4	4
Olimpia Bălți	5	6	8	8	8	9	10	11	11	11	11	10	10	10	8	8	8	9	8	8	6	6	6	6	6	6	6	6	5	5	5	5	5
Tiraspol	9	11	10	11	7	5	4	3	3	4	6	6	6	6	7	7	7	7	7	7	7	7	8	7	8	8	8	8	8	8	7	7	6
Iskra - Stal Rîbniţa	12	10	6	6	9	10	8	8	6	5	4	5	4	4	5	5	4	5	5	4	4	4	4	4	4	4	4	4	6	6	6	6	7
Nistru Otaci	9	5	7	7	5	6	6	6	8	8	8	8	7	7	6	6	6	6	6	6	8	8	7	8	7	7	7	7	7	7	8	8	8
Academia Chișinău	7	8	9	10	12	11	11	10	10	10	10	11	9	9	9	9	10	8	9	9	11	11	11	11	10	10	10	11	10	9	9	9	9
Sfîntul Gheorghe	4	4	2	3	6	7	7	7	7	7	7	7	8	8	10	10	9	10	10	10	10	10	10	10	11	11	11	9	11	11	10	10	10
CSCA – Rapid Chişinău	11	12	12	9	11	8	9	9	9	9	9	9	11	11	11	11	11	11	11	11	9	9	9	9	9	9	9	10	9	10	11	11	11
Costuleni	8	9	11	12	10	12	12	12	12	12	12	12	12	12	12	12	12	12	12	12	12	12	12	12	12	12	12	12	12	12	12	12	12

Source: kicker (in German)
= Leader; = 2nd place; = 3rd place; = Relegation

== Results ==
The schedule consists of three rounds. During the first two rounds, each team plays each other once home and away for a total of 22 matches. The pairings of the third round will then be set according to the standings after the first two rounds, giving every team a third game against each opponent for a total of 33 games per team.

=== First and second round ===
Home \ Away	ACA	CRC	COS	DAC	ISK	MIL	NIS	OLI	SFÎ	SHE	TIR	ZIM
Academia Chișinău		1–1	1–0	0–3	1–3	2–5	0–0	1–1	2–2	1–2	0–2	0–2
CSCA – Rapid Chişinău	3–2		0–0	1–2	2–1	1–1	0–0	0–0	0–0	1–2	0–1	1–2
Costuleni	1–1	1–2		0–1	3–3	1–3	0–0	0–0	2–1	0–2	0–4	0–0
Dacia Chișinău	3–1	3–0	1–0		1–2	2–0	1–0	3–1	2–0	0–0	1–1	2–0
Iskra - Stal Rîbniţa	1–1	4–0	3–0	1–4		0–1	0–0	1–1	3–0	1–2	3–1	0–3
Milsami Orhei	3–2	3–1	5–1	0–1	0–1		1–2	0–0	0–1	0–2	1–0	1–1
Nistru Otaci	0–1	2–0	0–0	1–3	1–2	2–1		0–1	2–0	0–3	1–1	2–2
Olimpia Bălți	1–0	4–0	0–0	0–1	2–1	0–1	0–3		1–2	1–2	1–0	0–0
Sfîntul Gheorghe	0–2	0–0	2–1	0–6	2–2	0–1	2–2	0–1		2–2	1–0	0–3
Sheriff Tiraspol	1–1	2–0	4–0	0–0	5–1	2–1	4–0	0–0	5–0		3–1	2–1
Tiraspol	0–0	0–1	3–1	0–2	0–1	0–0	2–0	0–0	1–1	2–3		0–0
Zimbru Chișinău	1–1	0–0	0–0	3–1	4–1	2–0	3–0	2–0	2–0	0–1	2–2	

Source: Moldovan Football Federation
Legend: Blue = home team win; Yellow = draw; Red = away team win.

=== Third round ===
Key numbers for pairing determination (number marks position after 22 games):

23rd round	24th round	25th round	26th round	27th round	28th round
1 – 12	12 – 7	2 – 12	12 – 8	3 – 12	12 – 9
2 – 11	8 – 6	3 – 1	9 – 7	4 – 2	10 – 8
3 – 10	9 – 5	4 – 11	10 – 6	5 – 1	11 – 7
4 – 9	10 – 4	5 – 10	11 – 5	6 – 11	1 – 6
5 – 8	11 – 3	6 – 9	1 – 4	7 – 10	2 – 5
6 – 7	1 – 2	7 – 8	2 – 3	8 – 9	3 – 4

29th round	30th round	31st round	32nd round	33rd round
4 – 12	12 – 10	5 – 12	12 – 11	6 – 12
5 – 3	11 – 9	6 – 4	1 – 10	7 – 5
6 – 2	1 – 8	7 – 3	2 – 9	8 – 4
7 – 1	2 – 7	8 – 2	3 – 8	9 – 3
8 – 11	3 – 6	9 – 1	4 – 7	10 – 2
9 – 10	4 – 5	10 – 11	5 – 6	11 – 1

Home \ Away	ACA	CRC	COS	DAC	ISK	MIL	NIS	OLI	SFÎ	SHE	TIR	ZIM
Academia Chișinău		3–1				1–0				2–0	1–1	1–2
CSCA – Rapid Chişinău						0–1			1–0	0–2	0–2	2–3
Costuleni	2–2	1–0					0–1		1–0		1–2	
Dacia Chișinău	3–0	2–0	3–0			2–1					0–0	4–0
Iskra - Stal Rîbniţa	1–1	1–2	1–1	0–2		0–2					0–2	
Milsami Orhei			2–1				0–2	2–2	3–0	0–1		1–0
Nistru Otaci	0–0	3–0		1–3	1–0			1–1				
Olimpia Bălți	1–0	3–0	2–0	1–0	0–0						0–0	
Sfîntul Gheorghe	2–0			3–1	0–1		1–0	0–0				
Sheriff Tiraspol			4–1	0–0	2–1		3–0	6–0	5–0			
Tiraspol						4–1	2–3		1–1	0–3		1–0
Zimbru Chișinău			1–0		1–0		3–0	1–1	2–0	1–0		

Source: Moldovan Football Federation
Legend: Blue = home team win; Yellow = draw; Red = away team win.

== Top goalscorers ==
Updated to matches played on 21 April 2013.

Rank	Player	Club	Goals
1	(Burkina Faso) Benjamin Balima	Sheriff Tiraspol	18
2	(Serbia) Aleksandar Pešić	Sheriff Tiraspol	14
2	(Moldova) Oleg Molla	Zimbru Chișinău	14
4	(Russia) Vasili Pavlov	FC Dacia Chișinău	12
5	(Moldova) Maxim Mihaliov	FC Dacia Chișinău	11
5	(Moldova) Ghenadie Orbu	FC Dacia Chișinău	11
7	(Brazil) Henrique Luvannor	Sheriff Tiraspol	9
7	(Moldova) Konstantin Yavorskiy	FC Iskra-Stal	9
7	(Ghana) Eric Sackey	Zimbru Chișinău	9
10	(Montenegro) Miloš Krkotić	FC Dacia Chișinău	8
10	(Moldova) Radu Catan	Zimbru Chișinău	8

7 goals (5 players)

- (Moldova) Maxim Antoniuc (FC Iskra-Stal)
- (Moldova) Anatolii Cheptine (FC Sheriff Tiraspol)
- (Moldova) Eugen Gorodețchi (FC Iskra-Stal)
- (Brazil) Ademar Xavier (FC Milsami)
- (Ukraine) Volodymyr Kilikevych (FC Iskra-Stal)

6 goals (2 players)

- (Moldova) Radu Gînsari (FC Academia Chișinău)
- (Moldova) Gheorghe Ovseannicov (FC Olimpia)

5 goals (4 players)

- (Romania) Adrian Grigoruță (FC Milsami)
- (Moldova) Alexandru S. Grosu (FC Tiraspol)
- (Ivory Coast) Ousmane Traoré (FC Milsami)
- (Ukraine) Yevhen Zarichnyuk (FC Tiraspol)

4 goals (9 players)

- (Cameroon) Jean Bouli (FC Olimpia)
- (Moldova) Igor Costrov (FC Tiraspol)
- (Ukraine) Artem Kozlov (FC Olimpia)
- (Romania) Cătălin Lichioiu (FC Nistru Otaci)
- (Moldova) Iurie Livandovschi (FC Academia Chișinău)
- (Nigeria) Jude Ogada (FC Olimpia)
- (Russia) Mihail Plătică (FC Academia Chișinău)
- (Moldova) Alexandru Popovici (FC Tiraspol)
- (Romania) Claudiu Octavian Vâlcu (FC Nistru Otaci)

3 goals (25 players)

- (Moldova) Valeriu Ciupercă (FC Academia Chișinău)
- (Ukraine) Roland Bilala (FC Tiraspol)
- (Ukraine) Matviy Bobal (FC Dacia Chișinău)
- (Moldova) Alexandru Cucu (FC Sfîntul Gheorghe)
- (Moldova) Sergiu Cuznețov (Zimbru Chișinău)
- (Brazil) Célio Santos (FC Dacia Chișinău)
- (Moldova) Serghei Gheorghiev (Sheriff Tiraspol)
- (Moldova) Alexandru Golban (FC Milsami)
- (Moldova) Victor Gonța (FC Costuleni)
- (Burkina Faso) Adama Guira (FC Dacia Chișinău)
- (Moldova) Serghei Epureanu (FC Nistru Otaci)
- (Ivory Coast) Marcel Metoua (Sheriff Tiraspol)
- (Russia) Aleksandr Nechayev (FC Dacia Chișinău)
- (Russia) Daniil Nikolaev (Zimbru Chișinău)
- (Moldova) Andrei Novicov (FC Iskra-Stal)
- (Bolivia) Darwin Ríos (Sheriff Tiraspol)
- (Romania) Marius Robert Roman (FC Academia Chişinău)
- (Slovenia) Miral Samardžić (FC Sheriff Tiraspol)
- (Moldova) Marian Stoleru (FC Milsami)
- (Georgia (country)) Vazha Tarkhnishvili (FC Sheriff Tiraspol)
- (Moldova) Alexandru Tcaciuc (FC Nistru Otaci)
- (Moldova) Victor Truhanov (FC Iskra-Stal)
- (Moldova) Mihai Ţurcan (FC Tiraspol)
- (Moldova) Sergiu Zacon (FC Nistru Otaci)
- (Russia) Nail Zamaliyev (Sheriff Tiraspol)

2 goals (40 players)

- (Nigeria) Babatunde Ajibola (FC Olimpia)
- (Moldova) Dumitru Bacal (Rapid Ghidighici)
- (Romania) Alexandru Bălțoi (Rapid Ghidighici)
- (Moldova) Denis Banari (FC Nistru Otaci)
- (Russia) Akhmet Barakhoyev (FC Zimbru Chișinău)
- (Moldova) Andrian Cașcaval (FC Academia Chișinău)
- (Ukraine) Serhiy Chebotayev (FC Iskra-Stal)
- (Moldova) Oleg Clonin (Rapid Ghidighici)
- (Moldova) Alexandr Cucerenco (FC Nistru Otaci)
- (Brazil) Jhonatan Pereira (FC Sheriff Tiraspol)
- (Romania) Cristian Daminuță (FC Tiraspol)
- (Nigeria) Maxwell Egwuatu (FC Costuleni)
- (Spain) Rafael Wellington Pérez (FC Milsami)
- (Moldova) Valentin Furdui (FC Milsami)
- (Spain) Caio Suguino (FC Milsami)
- (Romania) Cornel Gheți (FC Milsami)
- (Moldova) Alexandru A. Grosu (FC Tiraspol)
- (Moldova) Serghei Istrati (FC Academia Chișinău)
- (Moldova) Ion Jardan (Rapid Ghidighici)
- (Moldova) Alexei Josan (Rapid Ghidighici)
- (Georgia (country)) Levan Korgalidze (FC Zimbru Chișinău)
- (Ukraine) Anton Kovalevsky (FC Zimbru Chișinău)
- (Ukraine) Maxim Kuba (FC Olimpia)
- (Russia) Igor Lambarschi (FC Academia Chișinău)
- (Moldova) Sergiu Mocanu (FC Costuleni)
- (Moldova) Renat Murguleț (FC Nistru Otaci)
- (Bosnia and Herzegovina) Denis Omerbegovic (Rapid Ghidighici)
- (Moldova) Octavian Onofrei (FC Costuleni)
- (Moldova) Serghei Pogreban (FC Nistru Otaci)
- (Russia) German Pyatnikov (FC Nistru Otaci)
- (Moldova) Alexandru Răilean (FC Sfîntul Gheorghe)
- (Turkey) Yakup Sertkaya (FC Costuleni)
- (Ukraine) Sandro Shugladze (FC Iskra-Stal)
- (Moldova) Eugen Sidorenco (FC Zimbru Chișinău)
- (Moldova) Oleg Șișchin (FC Zimbru Chișinău)
- (Argentina) Alfredo Rafael Sosa (FC Sheriff Tiraspol)
- (Moldova) Tudor Starciuc (Rapid Ghidighici)
- (Montenegro) Slaven Stjepanović (FC Dacia Chișinău)
- (Moldova) Ion Ursu (FC Sfîntul Gheorghe)

1 goals (62 players)

- (Moldova) Oleg Andronic (FC Academia Chișinău)
- (Azerbaijan) Daniel Akhtyamov (FC Tiraspol)
- (North Macedonia) Kemal Alomerović (FC Dacia Chișinău)
- (Romania) Daniel Bălașa (FC Zimbru Chișinău)
- (Romania) Daniel Barna (Rapid Ghidighici)
- (Moldova) Vitalie Bulat (FC Tiraspol)
- (Moldova) Victor Bulat (FC Tiraspol)
- (Moldova) Iulian Bursuc (FC Sfîntul Gheorghe)
- (Romania) Marius Călin (Rapid Ghidighici)
- (Romania) Adrian Caragea (FC Nistru Otaci)
- (Moldova) Vasile Carauș (FC Dacia Chișinău)
- (Moldova) Vadim Cemîrtan (FC Academia Chișinău)
- (Moldova) Andrei Ciofu (FC Milsami)
- (Moldova) Vadim Clipca (FC Olimpia)
- (Moldova) Andrei Cojocari (FC Dacia Chişinău)
- (Brazil) Vinicius Fabbron (FC Zimbru Chișinău)
- (Brazil) Fred Nélson de Olivera (FC Tiraspol)
- (Moldova) Alexandru Dedov (FC Sheriff Tiraspol)
- (Russia) Kirill Erokhin (FC Sfîntul Gheorghe)
- (Romania) Valerian Gârlă (FC Milsami)
- (Ukraine) Mykyta Gavrylenko (FC Iskra-Stal)
- (Moldova) Dumitru Gliga (FC Costuleni)
- (Moldova) Eugen Gorceac (FC Sfîntul Gheorghe)
- (Moldova) Eduard Grosu (FC Sfîntul Gheorghe)
- (Moldova) Sergiu Gusacov (FC Olimpia)
- (Haiti) Jean-Robens Jerome (FC Olimpia)
- (Ivory Coast) Kouadio Kouassi (FC Costuleni)
- (Guinea) Thomas Kourouma (FC Olimpia)
- (Moldova) Valentin Lungu (FC Costuleni)
- (Russia) Aleksey Lyubushkin (FC Academia Chișinău)
- (Moldova) Vitalie Manaliu (Rapid Ghidighici)
- (Moldova) Vitalie Mardari (FC Milsami)
- (Moldova) Sergiu Matei (FC Sfîntul Gheorghe)
- (Moldova) Alexandr Muzîciuc (FC Nistru Otaci)
- (Moldova) Gheorghe Nicologlo (FC Tiraspol)
- (Ghana) Yusif Nurudeen (FC Costuleni)
- (Moldova) Nicolae Orlovschi (FC Olimpia)
- (Moldova) Alexandr Pașcenco (Rapid Ghidighici)
- (Moldova) Daniel Pîslă (FC Olimpia)
- (Moldova) Vitalie Plămădeală (FC Zimbru Chișinău)
- (Moldova) Veaceslav Posmac (FC Sfîntul Gheorghe)
- (Moldova) Maxim Potîrniche (FC Academia Chișinău)
- (Moldova) Vladimir Potlog (FC Academia Chişinău)
- (Moldova) Denis Rassulov (FC Milsami)
- (Moldova) Vadim Rață (FC Sheriff Tiraspol)
- (Moldova) Vasile Rusu (Rapid Ghidighici)
- (Czech Republic) Aleš Šuster (FC Zimbru Chișinău)
- (Moldova) Alexandru Scripcenco (FC Iskra-Stal)
- (Ukraine) Vasyl Shehda (FC Nistru Otaci)
- (Moldova) Eugen Slivca (FC Zimbru Chișinău)
- (Moldova) Veaceslav Sofroni (FC Costuleni)
- (Moldova) Maxim Șoimu (FC Costuleni)
- (Moldova) Andrei Solodchi (FC Costuleni)
- (Moldova) Adrian Sosnovschi (FC Milsami)
- (Sweden) Osman Sow (FC Dacia Chișinău)
- (Moldova) Andrei Tcaciuc (FC Sfîntul Gheorghe)
- (Moldova) Alexandru Tofan (Rapid Ghidighici)
- (Sierra Leone) Abu Tommy (FC Sheriff Tiraspol)
- (Montenegro) Janko Tumbasević (FC Dacia Chișinău)
- (Moldova) Timur Vâlcu (FC Costuleni)
- (Moldova) Dmitrii Vornișel (FC Tiraspol)
- (Belarus) Vadim Yerchuk (FC Sfîntul Gheorghe)

=== Hat-tricks ===
Key
^{4}	Player scored four goals
^{5}	Player scored five goals

Player	Home	Away	Result	Date
(Burkina Faso) Wilfried Benjamin Balima	FC Sheriff Tiraspol	FC Costuleni	4–0	10 September 2014
(Serbia) Aleksandar Pešić	FC Sheriff Tiraspol	FC Olimpia	6–0	7 April 2012

=== Clean sheets ===
As of 5 May 2013

Rank	Player	Club	Clean sheets
1	(Moldova) Serghei Pașcenco	FC Olimpia	17
2	(Bulgaria) Georgi Georgiev	FC Tiraspol	12
2	(Moldova) Eugen Matiughin	FC Dacia Chișinău	12
4	(Moldova) Artiom Gaiduchevici	FC Dacia Chișinău	11
5	(Moldova) Alexandru Zveaghințev	FC Sheriff Tiraspol	10
5	(Moldova) Nicolae Calancea	FC Zimbru Chișinău	10
7	(Bulgaria) Vladislav Stoyanov	FC Sheriff Tiraspol	8
8	(Moldova) Maxim Copeliciuc	FC Academia Chișinău	7
8	(Moldova) Mihail Păiuș	FC Zimbru Chișinău	7
8	(Moldova) Ghenadie Moșneaga	FC Sfîntul Gheorghe	7
8	(Moldova) Andrian Negai	FC Milsami Orhei	7

== Disciplinary ==
Final classification.

Rank	Player	Club	Yellow Cards	Red Cards	Points
1	(Guinea) Ibrahima Camara	FC Olimpia	11	2	17
2	(Ukraine) Oleksandr Feshchenko	FC Tiraspol	7	2	13
2	(Moldova) Ștefan Caraulan	FC Sfîntul Gheorghe	7	2	13
