= 2009–10 FC Zimbru Chișinău season =

Zimbru
2009–10 Moldovan National Division season
- Manager: Ivan Tabanov
- Moldovan National Division: 4th
- Moldovan Cup: Round of 8
- UEFA Europa League: Second qualifying round

2009–10 Moldovan National Division season is the 19th Moldovan National Division season in the history of FC Zimbru Chișinău.

== Current squad ==
Squad given according to the official website as of the end of the season, June 6, 2010

Note: Flags indicate national team as defined under FIFA eligibility rules; some limited exceptions apply. Players may hold more than one non-FIFA nationality.

No.	Pos.	Nation	Player
22	GK	MDA	Nicolae Calancea
12	GK	MDA	Anatol Chirinciuc
3	DF	MDA	Ion Bojii
5	DF	MDA	Anton Muntean
14	DF	MDA	Sergiu Sîrbu
6	DF	MDA	Sergiu Cojocari
25	DF	MDA	Andrian Sosnovschi
23	DF	MDA	Ion Popuşoi
7	MF	MDA	Ion Demerji
15	MF	MDA	Petru Hvorosteanov
21	MF	MDA	Radu Catan

No.	Pos.	Nation	Player
17	MF	ROU	Ovidiu Mendizov
18	MF	MDA	Oleg Clonin
19	MF	MDA	Andrei Secrieru
9	FW	MDA	Alexandru Antoniuc
24	FW	MDA	Oleg Andronic
16	FW	MDA	Bezimov Alexandr
11	FW	BUL	Kaloian Anghelov
20	FW	MDA	Eugen Sdorenco
10	FW	MDA	Victor Berco

=== UEFA Europa League ===
==== Qualifying round ====
2 July 2009 First qualifying round 1st leg	Zimbru Chișinău (Moldova)	1–2	(Kazakhstan) Okzhetpes	Chișinău, Moldova
18:00	Demerji 48'	Report	Karakulov 72'; Çoňkaýew 74'	Stadium: Zimbru Stadium; Attendance: 3,062; Referee: Gerhard Grobelnik (Austria)

9 July 2009 First qualifying round 2nd leg	Okzhetpes (Kazakhstan)	0–2 (2–3 agg.)	(Moldova) Zimbru Chișinău	Kokshetau, Kazakhstan
14:00		Report	O.Andronic 16'; G.Andronic 19'	Stadium: Torpedo Stadium; Attendance: 3,500; Referee: Andriy Shandor (Ukraine)

16 July 2009 Second qualifying round 1st leg	Zimbru Chișinău (Moldova)	0–0	(Portugal) Paços de Ferreira	Chișinău, Moldova
18:30		Report		Stadium: Zimbru Stadium; Attendance: 7,000; Referee: Philippe Kalt (France)

23 July 2009 Second qualifying round 2nd leg	Paços de Ferreira (Portugal)	1–0 (1–0 agg.)	(Moldova) Zimbru Chișinău	Guimarães, Portugal
21:05	C.Oliveira 84'	Report		Stadium: Estádio D. Afonso Henriques; Attendance: 1,658; Referee: Fırat Aydınus (Turkey)

== See also ==
- 2014–15 FC Zimbru Chișinău season
