= Vîlcu =

Vîlcu is a surname. Notable people with the surname include:

- Claudiu Vîlcu (born 1987), Romanian footballer
- Ion Vîlcu (born 1966), Romanian software engineer
