= Lyubushkin =

Lyubushkin (Russian: Любушкин) is a masculine Russian surname; its feminine counterpart is Lyubushkina. Notable people with the surname include:

- Aleksei Lyubushkin (born 1990), Russian football defender
- Ekaterina Lyubushkina (born 1990), Russian volleyball player
- Ilya Lyubushkin (born 1994), Russian ice hockey defenceman
