= Chimezie =

Chimezie is a name of Igbo origin from southeastern Nigeria. Derived from the Igbo language, the name combines Chi (personal divine spirit) and mezie (to repair, correct, or make right) and is commonly translated as “May chi make it good," "May chi fix it,” “chi makes it right,” or “chi has repaired it.” Chimezie is both a given name and a surname.

The name is predominantly masculine, though it is also occasionally used for females in contemporary naming practice.

== People with the given name ==
- Chimezie Ikeazor (1930–2012), Nigerian lawyer
- Chimezie Imo (born 1992), Nigerian actor
- Chimezie Mbah (born 1992), Nigerian footballer
- Chimezie Metu (born 1997), Nigerian-American basketball player
- Chimezie Onwuzulike (born 1987), Nigerian cricketer
- Maxwell Chimezie Egwuatu (born 1991), Nigerian footballer

== People with the surname ==
- Bright Chimezie (born 1960), Nigerian musician
