= Stade Gbegamey =

Stadium in Cotonou, Benin

- Stade Gbegamey
- Interactive map of Stade Gbegamey
- Full name: Stade Gbegamey
- Location: Cotonou, Benin
- Capacity: 5,000

Tenant
- Mambas Noirs FC

Stade Gbegamey is a multi-use stadium in Cotonou, Benin. It is currently used mostly for football matches and is the home ground of Mambas Noirs FC of the Benin Premier League. The stadium has a capacity of 5,000 spectators.
