= Maxwell Chimezie Egwuatu =

Nigerian footballer (born 1991)

- Maxwell Chimezie Egwuatu, Nigerian footballer

Personal information
- Date of birth: 20 August 1991 (age 35)
- Place of birth: Lagos, Nigeria
- Height: 1.88 m (6 ft 2 in)
- Position: Striker

Team information
- Current team: Al-Seeb
- Number: 26

Youth career
- 2006–2008: Lad-One FC

Senior career*
Years	Team	Apps	(Gls)
2008–2009	Julius Berger	?	(?)
2010–2011	Mambas Noirs	?	(?)
2011	→ AS Dragons FC de l'Ouémé (loan)	?	(?)
2011–2014	Costuleni	53	(18)
2015–2016	Budaiya	13	(9)
2016–2017	Al-Seeb	11	(5)

International career
2008	Nigeria U-17	2	(0)
2011	Nigeria U-20	1	(0)
- * Club domestic league appearances and goals

Maxwell Chimezie Egwuatu (born 20 August 1991) is a Nigerian footballer who last played for Al-Seeb Club in the Oman First Division League.

== Club career ==
Maxwell Chimezie Egwuatu - FC Costuleni

=== Youth career ===
Born and raised in Lagos, Nigeria, Maxwell began his footballing career in 2006 with a local club, Lad-One FC and worked on his footballing skills for a span of two years.

=== Julius Berger ===
Maxwell began his professional footballing career in 2008 with his hometown, Lagos-based side, Julius Berger FC (now knows as Bridge FC).

=== Mambas Noirs ===
A year later, he again moved out of Nigeria and this time to the neighboring country of Benin where he signed a one-year contract with Benin Premier League side, Mambas Noirs FC. He also had a short stint on loan at the AS Dragons FC de l'Ouémé in 2011.

=== Costuleni ===
He first moved out to the Europe in 2011 to Moldova where he signed a three-year contract with Costuleni, Ungheni-based, FC Costuleni. He made his Moldovan National Division on 22 October 2011 in a 1-0 loss against FC Academia Chișinău and scored his first goal on 27 April 2012 in a 1-0 win over FC Rapid Ghidighici. He scored 3 goals in 13 appearances in the 2011–12 Moldovan National Division.

He made his first appearance in the 2012–13 Moldovan National Division on 13 July 2012 in a 5-0 loss against FC Sheriff Tiraspol and scored his first goal on 24 November 2012 in a 1-1 draw against FC Tiraspol. He scored 9 goals in 27 appearances in the 2012–13 season of the Moldovan National Division.

In the 2013–14 Moldovan National Division, he made his first appearance on 27 July 2013 in a 2-1 loss against FC Rapid Ghidighici and scored his first goal on 3 August 2013 in a 2-1 loss against FC Speranța Crihana Veche. With 6 goals in 13 appearances he was adjudged the club top scorer for the 2013-14 season.

=== Budaiya ===
In 2015, he moved out to the Middle East and more accurately to Bahrain where he signed a one-year contract with Bahraini Second Division League side, Budaiya Club. He scored 9 goal in 13 appearances in the 2015-16 Bahraini Second Division League and also 5 goals in 5 appearances in the cup competitions of the country, thus becoming the club top scorer for the season.

=== Club career statistics ===
Club	Season	Division	League		Cup		Continental		Other		Total	
Club	Season	Division	Apps	Goals	Apps	Goals	Apps	Goals	Apps	Goals	Apps	Goals
Costuleni	2011–12	Moldovan National Division	13	2	0	0	0	0	0	0	13	2
Costuleni	2012–13	Moldovan National Division	13	1	0	0	0	0	0	0	13	1
Costuleni	2013–14	Moldovan National Division	27	5	0	0	0	0	0	0	27	5
Costuleni	Total		53	8	0	0	0	0	0	0	53	8
Budaiya	2015–16	Bahraini Second Division League	13	9	5	5	0	0	0	0	18	14
Budaiya	Total		13	9	5	5	0	0	0	0	18	14
Al-Seeb	2016–17	Oman First Division League	11	5	1	0	0	0	0	0	12	5
Al-Seeb	Total		11	5	1	0	0	0	0	0	12	5
Career total			77	22	6	5	0	0	0	0	83	27
