= Ion Demerji =

Moldovan footballer

Personal information
- Full name: Ion Demerji
- Date of birth: 28 April 1989 (age 37)
- Place of birth: Moldova
- Height: 1.73 m (5 ft 8 in)
- Position: Midfielder

Team information
- Current team: FC Saxan
- Number: 9

Senior career*
Years	Team	Apps	(Gls)
2007–2011	Zimbru Chișinău	78	(6)
2011	FC Sfîntul Gheorghe	12	(3)
2011–2012	Zimbru Chișinău	11	(0)
2012–2013	Academia Chișinău	26	(2)
2013–	FC Saxan	0	(0)
Total		127	(10)

International career
	Moldova U17	7	(0)
	Moldova U19	6	(0)
	Moldova U21	3	(0)
- * Club domestic league appearances and goals

Ion Demerji (born 28 April 1989) is a football player who since 2013 has played for FC Saxan.
