= Adama Guira =

Burkinabé footballer (born 1988)

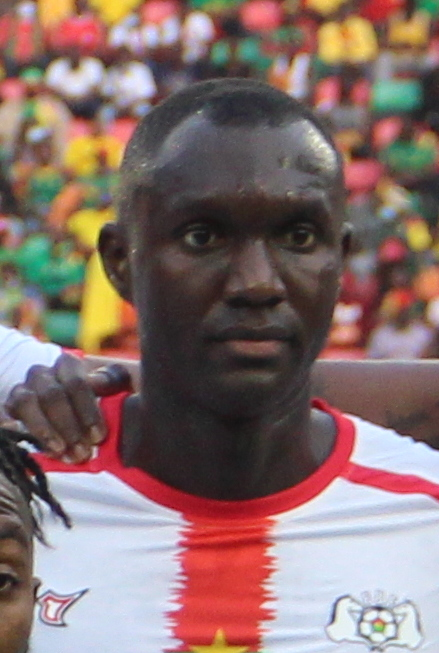
- Guira with Burkina Faso in 2022

Personal information
- Date of birth: 24 April 1988 (age 38)
- Place of birth: Bobo-Dioulasso, Burkina Faso
- Height: 1.85 m (6 ft 1 in)
- Position: Midfielder

Senior career*
Years	Team	Apps	(Gls)
2005–2008	RC Bobo Dioulasso		
2008–2009	Gavà	27	(0)
2009–2010	Alicante	34	(1)
2010–2011	Logroñés	17	(0)
2011	Djurgården	6	(0)
2011–2013	Dacia Chișinău	37	(3)
2013–2016	SønderjyskE	96	(3)
2016–2017	Lens	7	(0)
2017	Lens II	4	(0)
2017–2019	AGF	51	(0)
2019–2020	R&F	11	(1)
2021	SønderjyskE	4	(0)
2021–2022	Racing Rioja	12	(0)
2022	Qingdao Hainiu	28	(2)
2023–2024	Racing Rioja	17	(1)
2024	Yagüe	0	(0)
Total		361	(11)

International career^{‡}
2010–2024	Burkina Faso	53	(0)
Medal record
Representing Burkina Faso
Africa Cup of Nations
Third place	2017 Gabon
- * Club domestic league appearances and goals as of 16 December 2023 ‡ National team caps and goals as of 20 January 2024

Adama Guira (born 24 April 1988) is a Burkinabé former professional footballer who played as a midfielder.

== Club career ==
Born in Bobo-Dioulasso, Guira has played club football in Burkina Faso, Spain, Sweden, Moldova and Denmark for RC Bobo Dioulasso, Gavà, Alicante, Logroñés, Djurgården, Dacia Chișinău and SønderjyskE.

In July 2017, Guira returned to Denmark and joined AGF. He left the club two years later, to join Hong Kong Premier League club R&F. On 14 October 2020, Guira left the club after his club's withdrawal from the HKPL in the new season.

On 6 February 2021, Guira returned to SønderjyskE in Denmark, on a deal for the rest of the season. He left the club again at the end of the contract. He then signed for Racing Rioja.

== International career ==
Guira made his international debut for Burkina Faso in 2010. He was selected as part of Burkina Faso's preliminary squad for the 2015 Africa Cup of Nations.

== Career statistics ==
=== Club ===
As of 16 December 2023.

Appearances and goals by club, season and competition
Club	Season	League			Cup		Continental		Other		Total	
Club	Season	Division	Apps	Goals	Apps	Goals	Apps	Goals	Apps	Goals	Apps	Goals
Gavà	2008–09	Segunda División B	27	0	2	0	—		—		29	0
Alicante	2009–10	Segunda División B	34	1	3	0	—		—		37	1
Logroñés	2010–11	Segunda División B	17	0	4	0	—		—		21	0
Djurgården	2011	Allsvenskan	6	0	0	0	—		—		6	0
Dacia Chișinău	2011–12	Divizia Națională	12	3	0	0	—		—		12	3
Dacia Chișinău	2012–13	Divizia Națională	25	0	1	0	—		—		26	0
Dacia Chișinău	Total		37	3	1	0	—		—		38	3
SønderjyskE	2013–14	Danish Superliga	29	0	2	0	—		—		22	0
SønderjyskE	2014–15	Danish Superliga	29	2	5	0	—		—		34	2
SønderjyskE	2015–16	Danish Superliga	31	1	2	0	—		—		33	1
SønderjyskE	2016–17	Danish Superliga	7	0	0	0	5	0	—		12	0
SønderjyskE	Total		96	3	9	0	5	0	—		110	3
Lens	2016–17	Ligue 2	7	0	1	0	—		—		8	0
Lens II	2016–17	CFA	4	0	—		—		—		4	0
AGF	2017–18	Danish Superliga	21	0	1	0	—		—		22	0
AGF	2018–19	Danish Superliga	30	0	1	0	—		—		31	0
AGF	Total		51	0	2	0	—		—		53	0
R&F	2019–20	Hong Kong Premier League	11	1	3	0	—		2	0	16	1
SønderjyskE	2020–21	Danish Superliga	4	0	2	0	—		—		6	0
Racing Rioja	2021–22	Segunda División RFEF	12	0	1	0	—		—		13	0
Qingdao Hainiu	2022	China League One	28	2	1	0	—		—		29	2
Racing Rioja	2022–23	Segunda Federación	9	0	—		—		—		9	0
Racing Rioja	2023–24	Tercera Federación	8	1	—		—		—		8	1
Racing Rioja	Total		17	1	—		—		—		17	1
Career total			361	11	29	0	5	0	2	0	397	11

=== International ===
As of match played 20 January 2024

Appearances and goals by national team and year
National team	Year	Apps	Goals
Burkina Faso	2010	2	0
Burkina Faso	2013	1	0
Burkina Faso	2015	7	0
Burkina Faso	2016	5	0
Burkina Faso	2017	3	0
Burkina Faso	2018	1	0
Burkina Faso	2019	3	0
Burkina Faso	2020	2	0
Burkina Faso	2021	9	0
Burkina Faso	2022	9	0
Burkina Faso	2023	7	0
Burkina Faso	2024	4	0
Total		53	0

== Honors ==
Burkina Faso

- Africa Cup of Nations third place: 2017
