= Maksym Lapushenko =

Ukrainian footballer (born 1992)

Personal information
- Full name: Maksym Serhiyovych Lapushenko
- Date of birth: 19 February 1992 (age 34)
- Place of birth: Kyiv, Ukraine
- Height: 1.82 m (6 ft 0 in)
- Position: Left-back

Team information
- Current team: Gondomar
- Number: 19

Youth career
- 2005–2009: Dynamo Kyiv

Senior career*
Years	Team	Apps	(Gls)
2009–2011	Dynamo Kyiv	0	(0)
2009	Dynamo-2 Kyiv	0	(0)
2011–2014	Dacia Chișinău	20	(0)
2011–2013	→ Dacia-2 Buiucani	9	(0)
2015–2016	Leixões	17	(0)
2016–2017	Felgueiras	1	(0)
2017–2018	Fafe	5	(0)
2018–2022	Leça	45	(2)
2022–	Gondomar	22	(0)
- * Club domestic league appearances and goals as of 21:01, 30 August 2023 (UTC)

Maksym Lapushenko (Ukrainian: Максим Сергійович Лапушенко; born 19 February 1992) is a Ukraine football defender who plays for Campeonato de Portugal club Gondomar.
