= Sergiu Sîrbu (footballer, born 1986) =

Moldovan footballer

Personal information
- Full name: Sergiu Sîrbu
- Date of birth: 1 April 1986 (age 40)
- Place of birth: Brînzenii Vechi, Moldova
- Height: 1.78 m (5 ft 10 in)
- Positions: Midfielder; defender

Youth career
- 1999–2004: Liceul Internat Republican cu Profil Sportiv

International career
Years	Team	Apps	(Gls)
2007	Moldova U-21		

Sergiu Sîrbu (born 1 April 1986) is a Moldovan football player, who plays as midfielder or defender.

Sîrbu has debuted for Moldova U-21 national football team on 24 August 2007, in a match against Ukraine. He played in Moldovan National Division for 5 teams.

== Career ==
- 2004-2005 FC Unisport-Auto Chișinău (National Division - 8 matches)
- 2005-2006 FC Otaci (Divizia A)
- 2006-2007 FC Dacia-2 Goliador (Divizia A)
- 2007-2008 FC Besiktas Chișinău (Divizia A, Moldovan Cup)
- 2007-2008 FC Olimpia-2 (Divizia A)
- 2008-2009 FC Olimpia Bălți
- 2009-2010 FC Zimbru Chișinău
- 2009-2010 FC Milsami Orhei
- 2010-2011 FC Zimbru Chișinău
- 2010-2011 FC Costuleni
- 2011-2012 FC Costuleni
- 2012-2013 FC Zimbru Chișinău
- 2013-2015 FC Costuleni
