= Denis Ilescu =

Moldovan footballer (born 1987)

Personal information
- Full name: Denis Vasilyevich Ilescu
- Date of birth: 20 January 1987 (age 39)
- Place of birth: Teleneşti, Soviet Union
- Height: 1.90 m (6 ft 3 in)
- Position: Defender

Senior career*
| Years | Team | Apps | (Gls) |
| 2006 | Academia UTM Chişinău | 0 | (0) |
| 2007 | FC Kryvbas Kryvyi Rih | 1 | (0) |
| 2007–2008 | FC Saturn Moscow Oblast | 3 | (0) |
| 2008 | → Anzhi Makhachkala (loan) | 0 | (0) |
| 2009–2010 | Academia UTM Chişinău | 30 | (2) |
| 2010 | Lokomotiv Astana | 19 | (0) |
| 2011–2015 | Dacia Chişinău | 98 | (2) |
| 2015–2016 | Dinamo-Auto | 32 | (1) |
| 2016–2017 | Andijon | 15 | (0) |
| 2017–2018 | Dacia Chişinău | 25 | (4) |

International career
| ?–2008 | Moldova U21 | 1 | (0) |
| 2008– | Moldova | 2 | (0) |
- * Club domestic league appearances and goals

Denis Vasilyevich Ilescu (Russian: Денис Васильевич Илеску, born 20 January 1987) is a Moldovan footballer.

== Career ==
Ilescu started his career at football academy found by Igor Dobrovolski in Chişinău. In 2006–07 season he played for Academia UTM Chişinău which also owned by Dobrovolski at Moldovan "A" Division, in although the league is semi-professional, he was signed by FC Kryvbas Kryvyi Rih that season. He played once in Ukrainian Premier League before left for Russian Premier League side FC Saturn Moscow Oblast.

In 2008 season he left for Anzhi Makhachkala of Russian First Division on loan. But in June 2008 the loan was terminated early. In January 2009, he was putted to transfer market by Saturn.

In March 2009, he returned to Academia In the 2009–10 season, he scored a goal on 2 August 2009 against FC Zimbru Chişinău. The match ended in a 2–2 draw.

In January 2010, he followed Igor Dobrovolski to Dacia Chişinău on trial. Dobrovolski was trained with Dacia and is negotiating a coaching contract.

=== International career ===
Ilescu was call-up to Moldova U21 He played one match at 2009 UEFA European Under-21 Football Championship qualification. On 6 February 2008, he made his senior debut against Kazakhstan, substituted Alexandru Gaţcan in the 82nd minute. The team was coached by Igor Dobrovolski.
