= Pavel Secrier =

Moldovan footballer

Personal information
- Date of birth: 11 January 1991 (age 35)
- Place of birth: Chișinău, Moldavian SSR
- Height: 1.76 m (5 ft 9 1/2 in)
- Position: Midfielder

Senior career*
Years	Team	Apps	(Gls)
2011–2014	Dacia-2 Buiucani	41	(11)
2011–2014	Dacia Chișinău	1	(0)
2012	→ Sfântul Gheorghe (loan)	7	(5)
2013–2014	→ Sfântul Gheorghe (loan)	5	(0)
2014	→ Academia Chișinău (loan)	15	(1)
2015–2016	Speranța Nisporeni	33	(5)
2016	Granit Mikashevichi	15	(0)
2017	Zimbru Chișinău	15	(1)
2017	→ Zimbru-2 Chișinău	1	(0)
2017–2018	Foresta Suceava	19	(0)
2019	Zimbru Chișinău	10	(0)
- * Club domestic league appearances and goals as of 31 December 2019

Pavel Secrier (born 11 January 1991) is a Moldovan former footballer who played as a midfielder.
