= Branislav Atanacković =

Serbian footballer

Personal information
- Full name: Branislav Atanacković
- Date of birth: 5 August 1983 (age 43)
- Place of birth: Smederevo, SFR Yugoslavia
- Height: 1.80 m (5 ft 11 in)
- Position: Left-back

Team information
- Current team: FK Cepelin 026
- Number: 8

Youth career
- Sartid Smederevo
- Partizan

Senior career*
Years	Team	Apps	(Gls)
2001–2006	Partizan	2	(0)
2001–2002	→ Teleoptik (loan)	17	(7)
2003	→ Budućnost Banatski Dvor (loan)	15	(2)
2003	→ Teleoptik (loan)	9	(3)
2004	→ Mačva Šabac (loan)	17	(6)
2005	→ Slavija Sarajevo (loan)	12	(1)
2006	→ INON (loan)	15	(1)
2006–2007	INON	6	(0)
2007	→ Smederevo (loan)	5	(0)
2007–2011	Smederevo	87	(3)
2011	Dacia Chișinău	4	(0)
2012	Borac Čačak	8	(0)
2013	Smederevo	9	(0)
- * Club domestic league appearances and goals

Branislav Atanacković (Serbian Cyrillic: Бранислав Атанацковић; born 5 August 1983) is a Serbian professional footballer who plays as a left-back.

Atanacković came through the youth system of Partizan, making two appearances for the first team in the 2004–05 season. He also played on loan for numerous clubs, such as Teleoptik, Budućnost Banatski Dvor and Mačva Šabac. Eventually, Atanacković spent the majority of his career with Smederevo, making over 100 competitive appearances for the club.

== Honours ==
Dacia Chișinău

- Moldovan Super Cup: 2011
