= Jorge Araújo =

Portuguese footballer

Personal information
- Full name: Leyzller Jorge Lopes de Araújo
- Date of birth: 29 July 1988 (age 38)
- Place of birth: Lisbon, Portugal
- Height: 1.83 m (6 ft 0 in)
- Positions: Right full back; winger

Youth career
- 2000: Joca Luanda
- 2001: ASA
- 2002–2003: Petro Luanda
- 2004–2006: Porto

Senior career*
Years	Team	Apps	(Gls)
2006–2007	Worthing		
2007-2009	Whitehawk	1	(0)
2009–2010	Havant & Waterlooville	5	(1)
2010–2011	Esperança Lagos	11	(2)
2011–2012	Dacia Chișinău	7	(0)
2012–2013	Olhanense	0	(0)
2012	→ Farense (loan)	9	(0)
2013	Primeiro de Agosto		
2013–2014	Recreativo	1	(0)
2014	→ Elche B (loan)	0	(0)
2014–2015	Lucena	19	(0)
2015	Desportivo Huíla		
2015	Bragantino		(0)
2015	Cruzeiro-RS		(0)
2015–2017	Olhanense	0	(0)
- * Club domestic league appearances and goals as of 10 August 2016

Leyzller Jorge Lopes de Araújo (born 29 July 1988), known as Jorge Araújo or simply Araújo, is a Portuguese footballer who plays as a right back or right winger. He also holds an Angolan passport.

== Club career ==
After playing youth football with Atlético Sport Aviação, Atlético Petróleos de Luanda, F.C. Porto, Araújo made his senior debut with Worthing in West Sussex, England before joining Whitehawk, where he made one league and cup appearance over two seasons.

He returned to Portugal in May 2010, joining CF Esperança de Lagos, after a brief period at Havant & Waterlooville F.C.

In 2011 summer, Araújo switched teams and countries again, signing for Moldovan National Division side FC Dacia Chișinău. In February of the following year, after appearing in only seven matches, he returned to his country and joined Primeira Liga club S.C. Olhanense.

After a loan stint at S.C. Farense, Araújo was released by Olhanense in January 2013 and moved back to his home country in the following month, signing for C.D. Primeiro de Agosto. In June he went on a trial at Recreativo de Huelva, and signed a two-year deal late in the month.

Araújo made his debut for the Andalusians on 10 November, coming on as a late substitute in a 0–1 home loss against Deportivo de La Coruña in the Segunda División. On 24 January of the following year, after failing to appear in any further matches, he was loaned to Elche CF Ilicitano until June; he subsequently made no appearances for the latter.

In August 2014 Araújo rescinded his link with Recre, and joined Lucena CF in Segunda División B. He rescinded with the club on 13 January of the following year.

After a spell at Desportivo Huíla, he joined Bragantino in Brazil.
