= Miloš Krkotić =

Montenegrin footballer

Personal information
- Date of birth: 29 September 1987 (age 39)
- Place of birth: Golubovci, SFR Yugoslavia
- Height: 1.85 m (6 ft 1 in)
- Position: Midfielder

Team information
- Current team: Otrant-Olympic
- Number: 10

Senior career*
Years	Team	Apps	(Gls)
2006–2011	Zeta	71	(3)
2011–2015	Dacia Chișinău	101	(33)
2016–2017	Zeta	15	(4)
2017	Metalac	10	(0)
2017	Mladost	4	(0)
2017–2018	Kukësi	14	(0)
2018	Bali United	9	(0)
2019	Budućnost	10	(1)
2019	Feronikeli	4	(0)
2021–2022	Zlatibor Čajetina	11	(0)
2022–	Otrant-Olympic	38	(4)

International career
2013	Montenegro	5	(0)
- * Club domestic league appearances and goals as of 21 May 2024

Miloš Krkotić (Serbian Cyrillic: Милош Кркотић, born 29 September 1987) is a Montenegrin professional footballer who plays as a midfielder for second-tier club Otrant-Olympic. He made five appearances for the Montenegro national team in 2013.

== Club career ==
Krkotić started playing with FK Zeta and was promoted to the senior squad in the 2006–07 season, precisely when Zeta won their first ever championship.

In Summer 2011, Moldovan champions FC Dacia Chișinău, coached by Igor Dobrovolski, brought Miloš Krkotić along his compatriot Janko Tumbasević as summer reinforcements. Krkotić performed regularly until 2015. He won the 2011 Moldovan Super Cup as soon as he came but unfortunately Dacia missed to win the championship while Krkotić was there and finished as second in the league four out of five seasons he spent there. In the 2013–14 season, Krkotić scored 14 goals in the league, a feature that earned him attention from Montenegrin FA and a call to the national team.

After five seasons in Moldova, Krkotić returned to Zeta in summer 2016 and his solid performance by scoring 4 goals in 15 appearances during the first half of the 2016–17 Montenegrin First League earned him attention from several clubs, including Serbian giant FK Partizan Belgrade.

At winter-break, Krkotić moved abroad again, this time by signing with Serbian top-league club FK Metalac Gornji Milanovac. He had a brief spell in 2017 with FK Mladost before finally joining Albanian champions FK Kukësi in the Albanian Superliga.

On 18 March 2018, he signed a one-year contract with Indonesian club Bali United. But he was released on 5 July 2018.

== International career ==
Krkotić made his debut for the Montenegro national team on 26 March 2013 in a 1–1 draw against England in FIFA World Cup 2014 qualifying and has earned a total of five caps, scoring no goals. His final international was a November 2013 friendly match against Luxembourg.

== Honours ==
Zeta

- Montenegrin First League: 2006–07

Dacia Chișinău

- Moldovan Super Cup: 2011
