= Alexandru Leu =

Moldovan footballer

Personal information
- Full name: Alexandru Leu
- Date of birth: 4 May 1991 (age 35)
- Place of birth: Moldova
- Height: 1.82 m (5 ft 11 1/2 in)
- Position: Defender

Team information
- Current team: Glentoran
- Number: 29

Senior career*
Years	Team	Apps	(Gls)
2009–2014	FC Rapid Ghidighici	67	(3)
2014–2015	Academia Chișinău	18	(0)
2016–	Glentoran	5	(0)

International career
2011–2012	Moldova U21	5	(0)
2014	Moldova	1	(0)
- * Club domestic league appearances and goals

Alexandru Leu (born 4 May 1991) is a Moldovan football player who currently plays for Glentoran in the NIFL Premiership.

On 24 August, it was announced that Leu would be moving to Glentoran subject to international clearance.
