= Mambas Noirs FC =

Beninese football club

- Full name: Mambas Noirs Football Club
- Founded: 1992
- Ground: Stade Gbegamey, Cotonou, Benin
- Capacity: 5000
- Manager: Yussif Haruna
- League: Benin Premier League

Mambas Noirs FC are a Beninese football club based in Cotonou. Founded in 1992, the club played in the Benin Premier League for several years in the 2000s and in 2017, and were relegated to the third division in 2019.

== History ==
The club was founded as Donjo FC in 1992 and changed their name to Mambas Noirs in 2005. Mambas Noirs played in the Beninese top division from 2003 to 2011.

The club qualified for the 2005 CAF Champions League as Donjo FC. The 2004 season was abandoned in part due to stadium renovations in Cotonou, and Donjo were selected by the federation to represent the country in the Champions League even though they did not win the 2004 title. Donjo lost in the preliminary round to RC Bafoussam of Cameroon.

Mambas were expelled from the Benin Premier League as being one of a dozen teams who did not finish the 2010 season, when they were excluded from the transitional championship and administratively relegated to the third division along with three other teams.

They were not readmitted to the competition in 2014.

The club returned to the top division in 2017 under manager Emile Enassouan.

They were relegated from the Ligue 2 to the third division in 2019.
