= Maxim Mihaliov =

Moldovan footballer

Personal information
- Date of birth: 22 August 1986 (age 40)
- Place of birth: Bender, Moldavian SSR, Soviet Union
- Height: 1.74 m (5 ft 8 1/2 in)
- Position: Midfielder

Team information
- Current team: FC Florești
- Number: 19

Senior career*
Years	Team	Apps	(Gls)
2005–2009	Dinamo Bender	109	(21)
2009–2010	Maccabi Herzliya	4	(0)
2010–2011	Iskra-Stal	35	(4)
2011–2014	Dacia Chișinău	82	(18)
2014–2015	Dinamo-Auto Tiraspol	21	(5)
2015–2016	Dacia Chișinău	21	(1)
2016–2018	Zaria Bălți	56	(11)
2018–2022	Dinamo-Auto Tiraspol	84	(23)
2022	Zimbru Chișinău	13	(2)
2023–	FC Florești	18	(2)

International career^{‡}
2016–	Moldova	13	(0)
- * Club domestic league appearances and goals as of 13 October 2023 ‡ National team caps and goals as of 8 April 2021

Maxim Mihaliov (born 22 August 1986) is a Moldovan footballer who plays as a midfielder for FC Florești in the Moldovan Super Liga.

== Club career ==
Mihaliov has only played club football in Moldova, except for one season in Israel. He started his career with local club Dinamo Bender. In the 2008–09 season, Mihaliov scored 12 goals in 29 games as Dinamo Bender ranked 5th in the table. He then transferred to Maccabi Herzliya in the Liga Leumit, where he only played four matches before returning to Moldova and Iskra-Stal. In the 2010–11 season, he won the league with Dacia Chișinău. He has later played for Dinamo-Auto Tiraspol and Zaria Bălți.

== International career ==
Mihaliov made his international debut for Moldova on 24 March 2016 in a friendly match against Malta.

== Honours ==
Dacia Chișinău

- Moldovan National Division: 2010–11
