= Kemal Alomerović =

Macedonian association football player

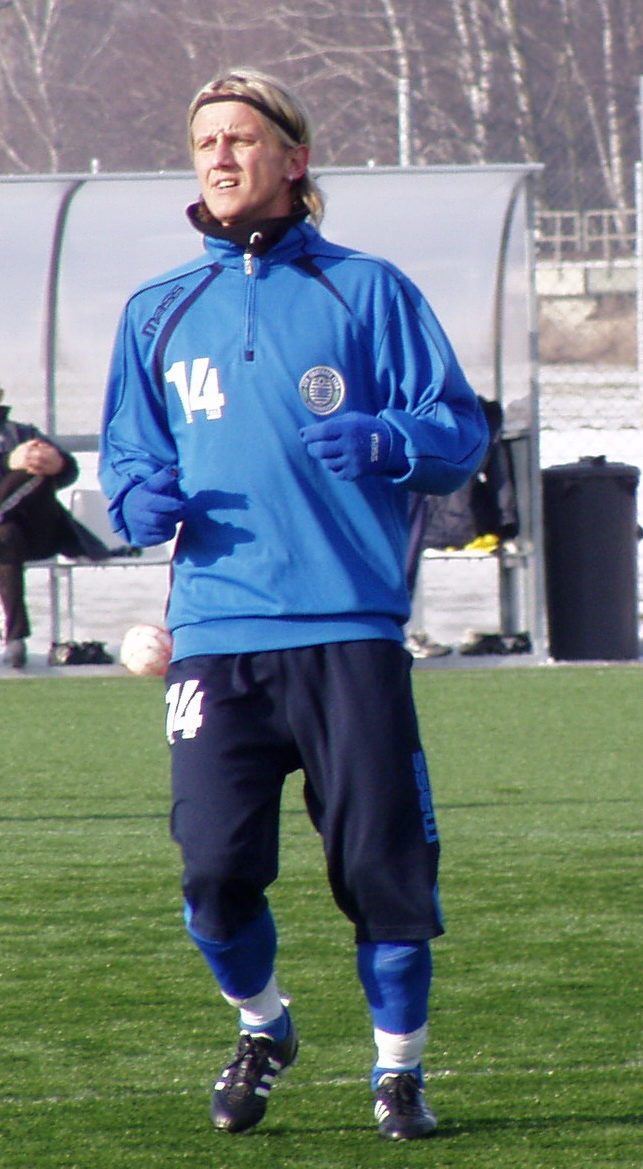

Personal information
- Full name: Kemal Alomerović
- Date of birth: 8 December 1980 (age 45)
- Place of birth: Skopje, SFR Yugoslavia
- Height: 1.74 m (5 ft 8 1/2 in)
- Positions: Central midfielder; attacking midfielder

Senior career*
Years	Team	Apps	(Gls)
2002–2004	Sileks	23	(1)
2004–2005	Bregalnica Kraun	45	(8)
2006	Marek Dupnitsa	9	(0)
2006–2007	Baškimi	12	(4)
2007–2008	Milano Kumanovo	22	(6)
2008–2009	Zalaegerszeg	21	(2)
2009	Sloga Jugomagnat	7	(1)
2010	Bylis Ballsh	8	(1)
2010–2011	Zeyar Shwe Myay	1	(0)
2011	Škendija	15	(2)
2011	FC Dacia Chişinău	9	(2)
2012	Škendija	14	(2)
2012–2013	Metalurg Skopje	23	(2)
2016	Akademija Pandev		
2016	Pobeda	1	(0)
2016–2017	Belasica		
- * Club domestic league appearances and goals

Kemal Alomerović (Macedonian: Keмaл Aлoмepoвиќ; born 8 December 1980) is a Macedonian retired football midfielder. He also holds Bosnian-Herzegovinian citizenship.

== Club career ==
He has previously played for Macedonian clubs FK Sileks, FK Bregalnica Kraun, FK Bashkimi, FK Milano Kumanovo, FK Sloga Jugomagnat and FK Metalurg Skopje, beside foreign spells with Bulgarian PFC Marek Dupnitsa and Hungarian Zalaegerszegi TE.

== Honours ==
Shkedija 79

- Macedonian First League (1): 2010–11

== External sources ==
- Profile at Playerhistory.
- Kemal Alomerović at WorldFootball.net
