= Andrei Cojocari =

Moldovan footballer

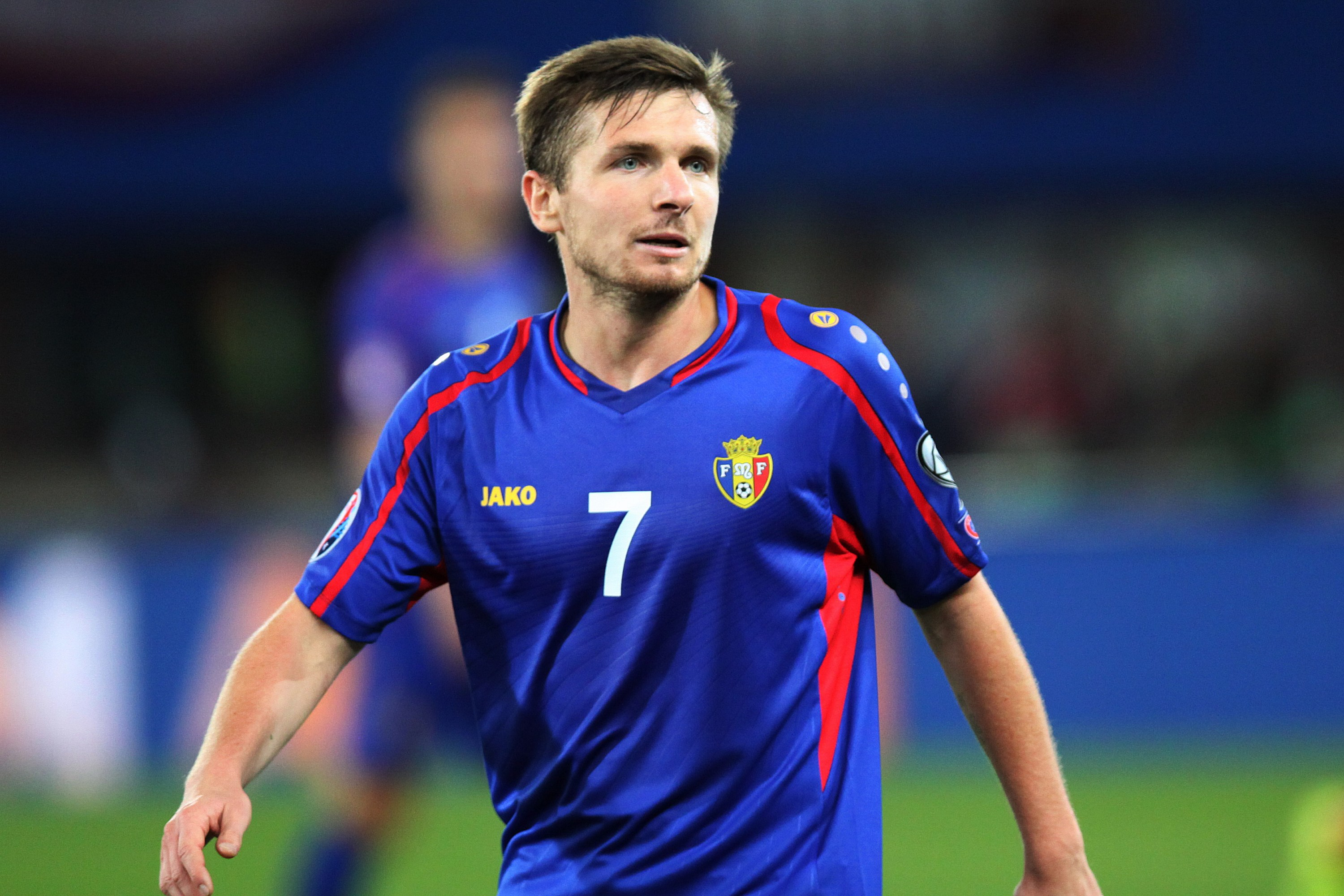
- Cojocari with Moldova in 2015

Personal information
- Date of birth: 21 January 1987 (age 39)
- Place of birth: Chișinău, Moldovan SSR, Soviet Union
- Height: 1.75 m (5 ft 9 in)
- Position: Midfielder

Senior career*
Years	Team	Apps	(Gls)
2005–2009	Zimbru Chișinău	92	(4)
2007–2008	→ Zimbru-2 Chișinău	1	(0)
2009	Liepājas Metalurgs	25	(0)
2009–2010	CSCA–Rapid Chişinău	9	(0)
2010–2013	Dacia Chișinău	86	(1)
2013–2014	Zimbru Chișinău	19	(2)
2014	Lokomotiv Tashkent	5	(0)
2014–2018	Milsami Orhei	111	(5)
2019	Zimbru Chișinău	13	(1)
2019	Petrocub Hîncești	11	(1)
2020	Speranța Nisporeni	2	(0)
2020–2021	Petrocub Hîncești	30	(2)
2021–2022	Zimbru Chișinău	17	(1)
2022	Dinamo-Auto Tiraspol	8	(0)
2022–2023	Sfîntul Gheorghe	13	(0)
2023–2024	Speranis Nisporeni		

International career^{‡}
	Moldova U19	3	(0)
	Moldova U21	6	(0)
2007–2021	Moldova	43	(2)
- * Club domestic league appearances and goals as of 1 August 2023 ‡ National team caps and goals as of 10 February 2025

Andrei Cojocari (born 21 January 1987) is a former Moldovan footballer who played as a midfielder. He was capped 43 times for the Moldova national team.

== Career statistics ==
=== International goals ===
List of international goals scored by Andrei Cojocari
No.	Date	Venue	Opponent	Score	Result	Competition
1	26 May 2010	Sportzentrum, Seekirchen, Austria	Azerbaijan	1–1	1–1	Friendly
2	17 January 2017	Jassim Bin Hamad Stadium, Doha, Qatar	Qatar	1–1	1–1	Friendly

== Honours ==
Zimbru Chișinău

- Moldovan Cup: 2006–07

Liepājas Metalurgs

- Latvian Higher League: 2009

Dacia Chișinău

- Moldovan National Division: 2010–11

Lokomotiv Tashkent

- Uzbekistan Cup: 2014

Milsami Orhei

- Moldovan National Division: 2014–15
- Moldovan Cup: 2017–18
