= Eduard Grosu =

Moldovan footballer

Personal information
- Date of birth: 5 January 1980 (age 46)
- Place of birth: Moldova
- Height: 1.75 m (5 ft 9 in)
- Position: Midfielder

Team information
- Current team: FC Dacia Chișinău

Senior career*
Years	Team	Apps	(Gls)
1996–1999	FC Agro Chişinău	34	(0)
1999–2004	CS Tiligul-Tiras Tiraspol	103	(2)
2004	FC Zhenis	14	(0)
2005	CS Tiligul-Tiras Tiraspol	31	(0)
2006	FC Metallurg Krasnoyarsk	21	(2)
2007–2008	FC Metallurg-Kuzbass Novokuznetsk	51	(2)
2009	FK Standard Sumgayit	1	(0)
2010–2011	FC Milsami-Ursidos Orhei	22	(0)
2011	FC Sfintul Gheorghe	15	(1)
2012	FC Dacia Chișinău	24	(0)

International career
2002–2005	Moldova	3	(0)
- * Club domestic league appearances and goals as of 10 March 2013

Eduard Grosu (born 5 January 1980) is a Moldovan footballer who currently plays for FC Dacia Chișinău.
