= Célio Santos =

Brazilian footballer (born 1987)

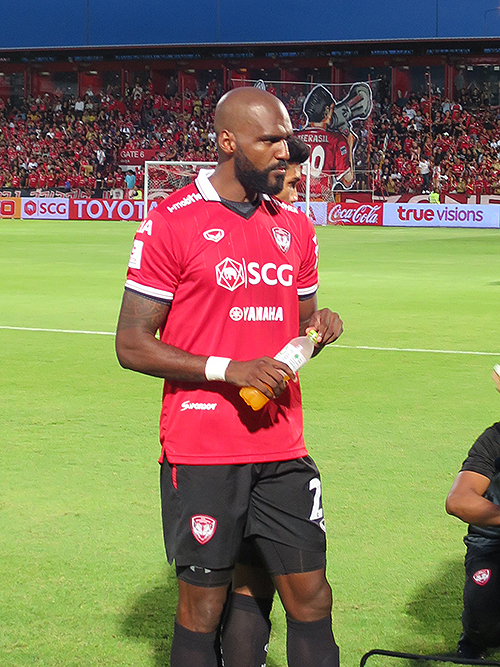

Personal information
- Full name: Célio Ferreira dos Santos
- Date of birth: 20 July 1987 (age 39)
- Place of birth: Paracatu, Brazil
- Height: 1.89 m (6 ft 2 in)
- Position: Centre-back

Youth career
- 2004–2005: URT-MG

Senior career*
| Years | Team | Apps | (Gls) |
| 2006 | Ferroviário AC | | |
| 2006–2008 | AA Ponte Preta | | |
| 2009 | Cascavel CR | | |
| 2009 | → AA Ponte Preta (loan) | | |
| 2009–2010 | Shaanxi Zhongjian Chanba | 6 | (0) |
| 2010–2011 | Belenenses | 17 | (0) |
| 2011–2012 | Dacia Chișinău | 27 | (3) |
| 2012–2014 | Tavriya Simferopol | 26 | (1) |
| 2015 | Tractor Sazi | 9 | (1) |
| 2015 | Al-Shaab CSC | 11 | (0) |
| 2016 | Avaí | 12 | (0) |
| 2016 | Ulsan Hyundai | 10 | (1) |
| 2017–2018 | Muangthong United | 33 | (1) |
| 2020–2021 | Santa Cruz | 21 | (1) |
| 2021–2022 | Kasetsart | 31 | (0) |
| 2023–2024 | Kuching City | 13 | (0) |
- * Club domestic league appearances and goals as of 4 September 2023

Célio Ferreira dos Santos (born July 20, 1987), or simply Célio Santos, is a Brazilian former footballer who plays as a defender.

== Eligibility controversy ==
An inquiry held by the Prime Minister of East Timor in 2016, heard that Celio Santos was one of seven Brazilian men's footballers to receive falsified baptism documents from Timor's Catholic Church, in order to make it appear he was eligible for Timorese nationality.

All seven players were based in Asia at the time, but only one, Juninho, has played for Timor's controversial national side.

It is unclear when Célio Santos received his Timorese passport, which he received despite having no known means of eligibility, such as a family connection, or residency.

== Honours ==
=== Club ===
SCG Muangthong United

- Thai League Cup (1): 2017
- Mekong Club Championship (1): 2017
