= Vasili Pavlov =

Russian footballer

Personal information
- Full name: Vasili Viktorovich Pavlov
- Date of birth: 24 July 1990 (age 36)
- Place of birth: Kuybyshev, Russian SFSR
- Height: 1.94 m (6 ft 4 in)
- Position: Forward

Youth career
- Konoplyov football academy

Senior career*
Years	Team	Apps	(Gls)
2007–2008	Yunit Samara	14	(1)
2008–2009	Academia Dimitrovgrad	34	(2)
2010	Krylia Sovetov Samara	0	(0)
2011–2013	Dacia Chișinău	56	(20)
2013	→ Brann (loan)	0	(0)
2014	Rubin-2 Kazan	8	(1)
2014	Khimki	12	(0)
2015	Teteks	10	(2)
2015	Dacia Chișinău	11	(0)
2016	Torpedo Armavir	6	(0)
2017–2018	Zorky Krasnogorsk	25	(10)
2018	Ventspils	12	(0)
2019	Chornomorets Odesa	22	(6)
- * Club domestic league appearances and goals

Vasili Viktorovich Pavlov (Russian: Василий Викторович Павлов; born 24 July 1990) is a Russian former professional football player.

== Club career ==
After their disappointing 0-4 loss to Rosenborg in Tippeligaen on 1 April 2013, Brann signed the tall forward on a four-month loan deal.

== Career statistics ==
Season	Club	Division	League		Cup		Total	
Season	Club	Division	Apps	Goals	Apps	Goals	Apps	Goals
2013	Brann	Tippeligaen	0	0	2	1	2	1
Career Total			0	0	2	1	2	1
