= Jude Ogada =

Nigerian footballer

Personal information
- Full name: Jude Iloba Ogada
- Date of birth: 15 December 1989 (age 36)
- Place of birth: Abuja, Nigeria
- Height: 1.75 m (5 ft 9 in)
- Position: Defender

Senior career*
Years	Team	Apps	(Gls)
2009–2012	Olimpia Bălți	111	(7)
2012–2013	Tiraspol	1	(0)
2013–2015	Dacia Chișinău	23	(1)
2015	FC Dinamo-Auto Tiraspol	6	(0)
- * Club domestic league appearances and goals as of 19 July 2015

Jude Iloba Ogada (born 15 December 1989, in Abuja, Nigeria) is a Nigerian football defender who last played for Dinamo-Auto Tiraspol.

== Club statistics ==
- Total matches played in Moldavian First League: 141 matches - 8 goals.
