= Claudiu Vîlcu =

Romanian footballer

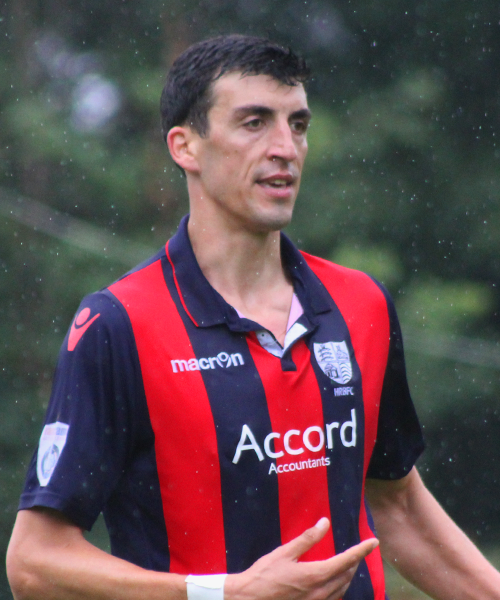
- Vîlcu playing for Hampton & Richmond Borough in July 2017

Personal information
- Full name: Claudiu Octavian Vîlcu
- Date of birth: 13 December 1987 (age 38)
- Place of birth: Brașov County, Romania
- Height: 1.94 m (6 ft 4 in)
- Position: Centre-back

Team information
- Current team: Haringey Borough

Youth career
- FC Brașov

Senior career*
Years	Team	Apps	(Gls)
2007–2009	Unirea Tărlungeni	1	(0)
2009	Minerul Lupeni	1	(0)
2009–2010	Juventus București	12	(2)
2010	Dinamo II București	14	(0)
2010–2012	Nistru Otaci	48	(9)
2012	Speranța Crihana Veche	8	(0)
2013	Wealdstone	0	(0)
2013–2014	FC Romania		
2013–2014	→ Banbury United (loan)	2	(0)
2014	Cambridge City	9	(0)
2015–2016	Enfield Town	55	(6)
2016	Bishop's Stortford	5	(0)
2016	Enfield Town	1	(0)
2016–2017	Wingate & Finchley	29	(1)
2017	Hampton & Richmond Borough	1	(0)
2017	Kingstonian	9	(0)
2017–2019	Wingate & Finchley	16	(0)
2020–	Haringey Borough	3	(0)
- * Club domestic league appearances and goals as of 21:44, 29 February 2020 (UTC)

Claudiu Octavian Vîlcu (born 13 December 1987), is a Romanian footballer who plays as a centre-back for Haringey Borough. He can also play as a centre-forward.

== Career ==
Born in Brașov County, Vîlcu began his career in the FC Brașov youth team, and studied law at the Transilvania University of Brașov, before playing in Liga II and Liga III with Unirea Tărlungeni, Minerul Lupeni, Juventus București and Dinamo II București. He won Liga III with Juventus in the 2009–10 season.

In the summer of 2010, he moved to Moldova and joined Nistru Otaci, playing 48 Moldovan National Division games over the next two seasons, scoring nine goals. A short spell with Speranța Crihana Veche in the first half of the 2012–13 season gave him a further eight appearances in the top flight.

In early 2013, he joined Isthmian League Premier Division side Wealdstone, but did not make an appearance.

Vîlcu played for Histon in a pre-season friendly against a Brentford XI on 16 July 2013.

During the 2013–14 pre-season, Vîlcu went on trial at Barnet in the Conference Premier. Director of football Paul Fairclough announced that Vîlcu had signed for them on 7 August 2013, but there was no further news on the transfer until 4 September, when it was announced that the club had applied for a work permit for Vîlcu. This application was rejected.

Vîlcu then signed for Essex Senior Football League side FC Romania, and also joined Southern Football League side Banbury United on dual registration on 4 November.

In the 2014–15 season, Vîlcu played for Cambridge City before joining Enfield Town. On 29 July 2016 it was announced he had signed for Bishop's Stortford. He returned to Enfield Town briefly before being released. Vîlcu then signed for Wingate & Finchley in October 2016.

On 17 June 2017, Vîlcu joined National League South side Hampton & Richmond Borough on a one-year deal. He then joined Kingstonian in August 2017. Later that season he re-joined Wingate. He signed for Haringey Borough in February 2020.
