= Vasile Carauș =

Moldovan footballer (1988–2025)

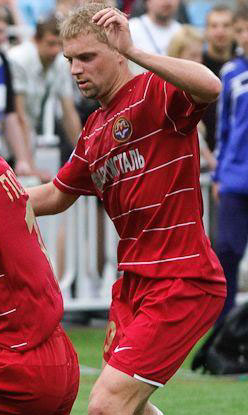
- Carauș playing for Metalurh Zaporizhya in 2010

Personal information
- Date of birth: 6 August 1988
- Place of birth: Criuleni, Moldavian SSR, Soviet Union
- Date of death: 5 December 2025 (aged 37)
- Height: 1.80 m (5 ft 11 in)
- Position: Midfielder

Senior career*
Years	Team	Apps	(Gls)
2007–2008	Academia UTM Chișinău	13	(1)
2008	Spartak Nalchik	0	(0)
2008–2009	Academia UTM Chișinău	11	(0)
2009–2011	Metalurh Zaporizhya	19	(0)
2011–2013	Dacia Chișinău	18	(1)
2013	Zimbru Chișinău	2	(0)
2013–2014	Speranța Crihana Veche	7	(0)
2014	Academia Chișinău	4	(0)
2014–2015	Veris Chișinău		
2015	Academia Chișinău		

International career
2007	Moldova U19	3	(0)
	Moldova U21	9	(0)
2009	Moldova	1	(0)
- * Club domestic league appearances and goals

Vasile Carauș (6 August 1988 – 5 December 2025) was a Moldovan professional footballer who played as a midfielder. He died from cancer on 5 December 2025, at the age of 37.
