= Aleksandr Nechayev (footballer, born 1989) =

Russian footballer

Personal information
- Full name: Aleksandr Yevgenyevich Nechayev
- Date of birth: 17 July 1989 (age 37)
- Place of birth: Saratov, Russian SFSR
- Height: 1.84 m (6 ft 1/2 in)
- Position: Forward

Youth career
- FC Sokol Saratov

Senior career*
Years	Team	Apps	(Gls)
2005–2006	FC Saturn Ramenskoye	0	(0)
2007–2008	FC Sokol-Saratov	49	(9)
2009	JBK		(13)
2010	FC Gubkin	25	(3)
2011	FC Dacia Chișinău	25	(4)
2012	FC Zvezda Ryazan	9	(4)
2012–2013	FC Gubkin	24	(3)
2014	FC Zvezda Ryazan	9	(0)
2014	FC SKChF Sevastopol	15	(4)
2015	FC Zenit Penza	7	(0)
- * Club domestic league appearances and goals

Aleksandr Yevgenyevich Nechayev (Russian: Александр Евгеньевич Нечаев; born 17 July 1989) is a former Russian professional football player.

== Club career ==
He played two seasons in the Moldovan National Division for FC Dacia Chișinău.
