= Igor Costrov =

Moldovan footballer

Personal information
- Full name: Igor Costrov
- Date of birth: 3 August 1987 (age 39)
- Place of birth: Bender, Moldavian SSR, Soviet Union
- Height: 1.76 m (5 ft 9 in)
- Position: Midfielder

Senior career*
Years	Team	Apps	(Gls)
2004–2008	Dinamo Bender	86	(7)
2008–2010	Hapoel Be'er Sheva	33	(6)
2009	→ Maccabi Herzliya (loan)	16	(5)
2010	Hapoel Be'er Sheva	14	(3)
2010	Kansas City Wizards	0	(0)
2010	Iskra-Stal	17	(0)
2011–2012	Tiraspol	57	(5)
2013	Dacia Chişinău	7	(0)
2013	Slavia Mozyr	13	(0)
2014	Costuleni	11	(0)
2014	Veris Chișinău	11	(0)
2015	Kyzylzhar	7	(0)
2015	Dinamo-Auto Tiraspol	15	(0)
2016–2020	Slavia Mozyr	125	(10)
2021–2022	Gomel	57	(2)
2023	Slavia Mozyr	21	(0)
2024	Neman Grodno	7	(0)
2025	BATE Borisov	8	(0)

International career^{‡}
2007	Moldova U21	1	(0)
2021	Moldova	2	(0)
- * Club domestic league appearances and goals as of 31 December 2024 ‡ National team caps and goals as of 7 June 2021

Igor Costrov (born 3 August 1987) is a Moldovan footballer who plays as a midfielder.

== Club career ==
Costrov began his professional career with FC Dinamo Bender in Moldova before signing with Liga Leumit club Hapoel Be'er Sheva. He signed with Major League Soccer club Kansas City Wizards in February 2010. However, Kostrov was released by the club without making a league appearance. He joined Belarusian club Slavia Mozyr in January 2016.

== International career ==
He made his debut for Moldova national football team on 3 June 2021 in a friendly against Turkey. He substituted Alexandru Antoniuc in the 67th minute.
