= Jean-Robens Jerome =

Haitian footballer (born 1983)

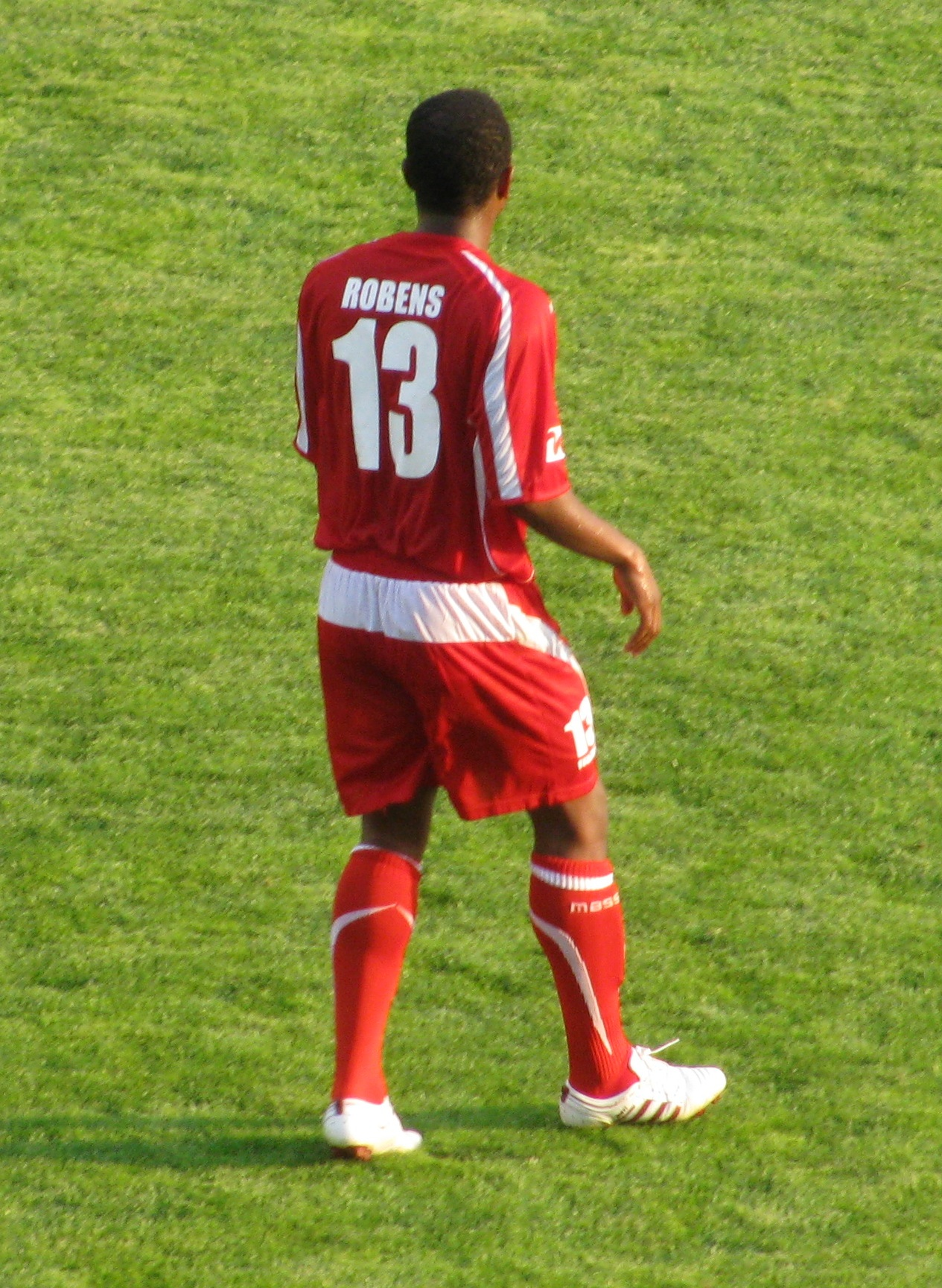

Personal information
- Date of birth: July 23, 1983 (age 43)
- Place of birth: Haiti
- Position: Forward

Senior career*
Years	Team	Apps	(Gls)
2006	Pittsburgh Riverhounds	10	(1)
2007–2008	Tiligul-Tiras Tiraspol	15	(0)
2008	Pittsburgh Riverhounds	19	(3)
2008–2009	Tiligul-Tiras Tiraspol	2	(0)
2009	Pittsburgh Riverhounds	2	(1)
2009–2012	Olimpia Bălţi	71	(8)

International career
2009	Haiti	4	(1)
- * Club domestic league appearances and goals as of 26 March 2015

Jean-Robens Jerome (born July 23, 1983) is a Haitian soccer player whose last known club was Olimpia Bălţi in the Moldovan National Division.

== Career ==
Jerome has spent much of his professional career bouncing between the United States and Moldova; he has had three stints playing for the Pittsburgh Riverhounds in the USL Second Division, making 31 appearances and scoring 5 goals during his tenure there.

Jerome has also played for Tiligul-Tiras Tiraspol in the Moldovan National Division, and returned to Moldova in 2009 to play for Olimpia Bălţi.

=== International ===
Jerome made his debut for the Haiti national football team in 2009, scored his first international goal on May 25, 2009, in a 1–1 tie with Jamaica, and was part of the Haiti squad at the 2009 CONCACAF Gold Cup.

== Career statistics ==
=== International ===
Appearances and goals by national team and year
National team	Year	Apps	Goals
Haiti	2009	4	1
Total		4	1

Scores and results list Haiti's goal tally first, score column indicates score after each Jerome goal.

List of international goals scored by Jean-Robbens Jerome
No.	Date	Venue	Opponent	Score	Result	Competition
1	23 May 2009	Lockhart Stadium, Fort Lauderdale, United States	Jamaica	1–1	2–2	Friendly
