= Slaven Stjepanović =

Montenegrin footballer

Personal information
- Full name: Slaven Stjepanović
- Date of birth: 2 November 1987 (age 39)
- Place of birth: Vareš, SFR Yugoslavia
- Height: 1.84 m (6 ft 1/2 in)
- Positions: Attacking midfielder; winger

Team information
- Current team: Ilićka 01 Brčko
- Number: 22

Youth career
- Jedinstvo Brčko
- Lokomotiva Brčko

Senior career*
Years	Team	Apps	(Gls)
2005–2007	Zeta	40	(15)
2007–2008	Partizan	7	(1)
2008–2010	Vojvodina	36	(2)
2010–2011	Trikala	19	(0)
2011–2012	Dacia Chișinău	22	(2)
2013	Iraklis Psachna	7	(1)
2013–2014	Vendsyssel	25	(3)
2014–2016	Dacia Chișinău	39	(9)
2016	Lokomotiv Tashkent	2	(0)
2017	Dacia Chișinău	15	(0)
2018	Petrovac	5	(0)
2019–2020	Zvijezda 09	30	(3)
2020–2021	Rudar Prijedor	26	(4)
2021–2022	Zvijezda 09	15	(6)
2022–2025	OFK Gradina		
2025–	Ilićka 01 Brčko		

International career
2007–2008	Montenegro U21	4	(0)
- * Club domestic league appearances and goals as of 21:27, 6 March 2022 (UTC)

Slaven Stjepanović (Cyrillic: Славен Стјепановић; born 2 November 1987) is a Montenegrin professional footballer who plays as an attacking midfielder or winger for Second League of the Republika Srpska club Ilićka 01 Brčko.

== Club career ==
Born in Vareš, Stjepanović spent his formation at Brčko rivals, Jedinstvo and Lokomotiva, in his native Bosnia and Herzegovina. He would go on to make his senior debuts with Montenegrin side Zeta during the 2005–06 Serbia and Montenegro SuperLiga, which would be the competition's final edition. In the inaugural 2006–07 Montenegrin First League, Stjepanović was the team's second-highest scorer with 12 goals, helping Zeta win the title. He additionally caught the attention of numerous clubs following his promising displays against Scottish champions Rangers in the 2007–08 UEFA Champions League qualifiers.

On 31 August 2007, on the last day of the summer transfer window, Stjepanović was acquired by Partizan, alongside his teammate Marko Ćetković, signing a four-year deal. He scored on his official debut for the club, coming on as a second-half substitute for Stevan Jovetić, in an eventual 4–1 away league win against Mladost Lučani on 22 September. However, only four days later, Stjepanović suffered an injury in a Serbian Cup game versus Rad, a 4–1 home success, ruling him out for almost two months. He received very little playing time after recovering, as Partizan won their first double after over a decade.

Stjepanović signed for Premier League of Bosnia and Herzegovina club FK Zvijezda 09 in January 2019. He made his debut for the club on 2 March 2019, in a 1–1 home league draw against NK Široki Brijeg. Stjepanović scored his first goal for Zvijezda on 30 March 2019, in one more 1–1 home league draw against Široki Brijeg. The club released him in April 2020.

On 27 June 2020, he joined First League of RS club FK Rudar Prijedor. In the summer 2021, he returned to his former club, FK Zvijezda 09.

== International career ==
Stjepanović was capped four times for Montenegro U21.

== Career statistics ==
Club	Season	League		Continental	
Club	Season	Apps	Goals	Apps	Goals
Zeta	2005–06	6	2	0	0
Zeta	2006–07	30	12	2	1
Zeta	2007–08	4	1	4	2
Zeta	Total	40	15	6	3

== Honours ==
Zeta

- Montenegrin First League: 2006–07

Partizan

- Serbian SuperLiga: 2007–08
- Serbian Cup: 2007–08

Dacia Chișinău

- Moldovan Super Cup: 2011

Lokomotiv Tashkent

- Uzbekistan Super League: 2016
- Uzbekistan Cup: 2016
