= Ovidiu Mendizov =

Romanian footballer

Personal information
- Full name: Ovidiu Ionuț Mendizov
- Date of birth: 9 August 1986 (age 40)
- Place of birth: Romania
- Positions: Defender; midfielder; winger

Senior career*
Years	Team	Apps	(Gls)
-2005	SR Brașov	1	(0)
2005/2006	FC Ghimbav 2000		
2006/2007	FC Precizia Săcele	13	(0)
2006/2007	FC Prefab 05 Modelu	12	(0)
2007/08-2009/10	FC Petrolul Ploiești	6	(0)
2009/2010	FC Zimbru Chișinău	12	(0)
2010–2012	FC Milsami Orhei	56	(0)
2012	FC Okzhetpes	13	(0)
2013/2014	SR Brașov	0	(0)
2013/2014	CSM Corona Brașov	8	(0)
2014–2015	FC Milsami Orhei	13	(0)
2016	Frånö SK	7	(11)
2016	Kramfors-Alliansen	6	(1)
2016	FC Fribourg		
2016/2017	SC Düdingen		
2017/2018	FC La Tour/Le Pâquier		
2018/2019	FC Stade-Payerne		
2018/2019	FC Corminboeuf		
- * Club domestic league appearances and goals

Ovidiu Mendizov (born 9 August 1986 in Romania) is a Romanian footballer.
