= Janko Tumbasević =

Montenegrin footballer

Personal information
- Date of birth: 14 January 1985 (age 41)
- Place of birth: Šabac, SR Serbia, SFR Yugoslavia
- Height: 1.78 m (5 ft 10 in)
- Position: Defensive midfielder

Team information
- Current team: Mladost Lučani
- Number: 8

Youth career
- Jedinstvo Štitar
- Milicionar

Senior career*
| Years | Team | Apps | (Gls) |
| 2002–2007 | Zeta | 114 | (4) |
| 2007–2011 | Vojvodina | 93 | (8) |
| 2011–2013 | Dacia Chișinău | 31 | (2) |
| 2012 | → Zimbru Chișinău (loan) | 16 | (2) |
| 2013–2015 | Vojvodina | 33 | (1) |
| 2014 | → Spartak Subotica (loan) | 6 | (0) |
| 2015–2016 | Spartak Subotica | 23 | (0) |
| 2016–2019 | Mladost Lučani | 89 | (8) |
| 2019–2021 | TSC | 54 | (7) |
| 2021–2022 | Mladost Lučani | 27 | (5) |
| 2022–2023 | Spartak Subotica | 32 | (2) |
| 2023– | Mladost Lučani | 91 | (3) |

International career
| 2002 | FR Yugoslavia U17 (Note: Official UEFA matches only) | 2 | (0) |
| 2006 | Serbia and Montenegro U21 | 1 | (0) |
| 2007 | Montenegro | 4 | (0) |
- * Club domestic league appearances and goals as of 13 June 2026

Janko Tumbasević (Serbian Cyrillic: Јанко Тумбасевић; born 14 January 1985) is a Montenegrin professional footballer who plays as a defensive midfielder for Serbian club Mladost Lučani.

== Club career ==
Tumbasević made his senior debut with Zeta under manager Nikola Rakojević in the second half of the 2001–02 First League of FR Yugoslavia. He made over 100 league appearances for the club and won the 2006–07 Montenegrin First League, while captaining the side.

In August 2007, Tumbasević was transferred to Vojvodina, alongside Žarko Korać. He spent the following four years at the club, before moving to Moldova and joining Dacia Chișinău. In the first half of the 2012–13 season, Tumbasević was on loan at Zimbru Chișinău, before returning to Dacia Chișinău in early 2013.

In June 2016, Tumbasević signed with Mladost Lučani. He spent three seasons with the club, making 102 appearances and scoring 14 goals across all competitions. After two years at TSC, Tumbasević returned to Mladost Lučani in June 2021.

== International career ==
Tumbasević represented FR Yugoslavia at the 2002 UEFA European Under-17 Championship, as the team were eliminated in the quarter-finals by England, thanks to Wayne Rooney's goal. He also made one appearance for Serbia and Montenegro at under-21 level.

At full international level, Tumbasević earned four caps for Montenegro, making his debut in the country's inaugural match, a 2–1 home friendly win over Hungary on 24 March 2007.

== Career statistics ==
=== Club ===
As of 8 June 2025

Appearances and goals by club, season and competition
| Club | Season | League | | | Cup | | Continental | | Total | |
| Club | Season | Division | Apps | Goals | Apps | Goals | Apps | Goals | Apps | Goals |
|---|---|---|---|---|---|---|---|---|---|---|
| Vojvodina | 2007–08 | Serbian SuperLiga | 21 | 2 | 1 | 0 | 0 | 0 | 22 | 2 |
| Vojvodina | 2008–09 | Serbian SuperLiga | 22 | 2 | 1 | 0 | 3 | 0 | 26 | 2 |
| Vojvodina | 2009–10 | Serbian SuperLiga | 24 | 2 | 5 | 2 | 2 | 0 | 31 | 4 |
| Vojvodina | 2010–11 | Serbian SuperLiga | 26 | 2 | 4 | 0 | — | | 30 | 2 |
| Vojvodina | Total | | 93 | 8 | 11 | 2 | 5 | 0 | 109 | 10 |
| Dacia Chișinău | 2011–12 | Moldovan National Division | 24 | 1 | 2 | 0 | 2 | 0 | 28 | 1 |
| Dacia Chișinău | 2012–13 | Moldovan National Division | 7 | 1 | 1 | 0 | 0 | 0 | 8 | 1 |
| Dacia Chișinău | Total | | 31 | 2 | 3 | 0 | 2 | 0 | 36 | 2 |
| Zimbru Chișinău (loan) | 2012–13 | Moldovan National Division | 16 | 2 | 1 | 0 | 4 | 0 | 21 | 2 |
| Vojvodina | 2013–14 | Serbian SuperLiga | 10 | 0 | 3 | 0 | 4 | 0 | 17 | 0 |
| Vojvodina | 2014–15 | Serbian SuperLiga | 23 | 1 | 2 | 0 | 0 | 0 | 25 | 1 |
| Vojvodina | Total | | 33 | 1 | 5 | 0 | 4 | 0 | 42 | 1 |
| Spartak Subotica (loan) | 2013–14 | Serbian SuperLiga | 6 | 0 | 2 | 0 | — | | 8 | 0 |
| Spartak Subotica | 2015–16 | Serbian SuperLiga | 23 | 0 | 3 | 0 | — | | 26 | 0 |
| Mladost Lučani | 2016–17 | Serbian SuperLiga | 31 | 1 | 1 | 0 | — | | 32 | 1 |
| Mladost Lučani | 2017–18 | Serbian SuperLiga | 27 | 1 | 6 | 5 | 2 | 0 | 35 | 6 |
| Mladost Lučani | 2018–19 | Serbian SuperLiga | 31 | 6 | 4 | 1 | — | | 35 | 7 |
| Mladost Lučani | Total | | 89 | 8 | 11 | 6 | 2 | 0 | 102 | 14 |
| TSC | 2019–20 | Serbian SuperLiga | 25 | 6 | 2 | 1 | — | | 27 | 7 |
| TSC | 2020–21 | Serbian SuperLiga | 29 | 1 | 3 | 0 | 1 | 1 | 33 | 2 |
| TSC | Total | | 54 | 7 | 5 | 1 | 1 | 1 | 60 | 9 |
| Mladost Lučani | 2021–22 | Serbian SuperLiga | 27 | 5 | 1 | 0 | — | | 28 | 5 |
| Spartak Subotica | 2022–23 | Serbian SuperLiga | 32 | 2 | 2 | 0 | — | | 34 | 2 |
| Mladost Lučani | 2023–24 | Serbian SuperLiga | 34 | 1 | 0 | 0 | — | | 34 | 1 |
| Mladost Lučani | 2024–25 | Serbian SuperLiga | 24 | 1 | 0 | 0 | — | | 24 | 1 |
| Mladost Lučani | Total | | 58 | 2 | 0 | 0 | — | | 58 | 2 |
| Career total | | | 462 | 37 | 44 | 9 | 18 | 1 | 524 | 47 |

=== International ===
Appearances and goals by national team and year
| National team | Year | Apps | Goals |
|---|---|---|---|
| Montenegro | 2007 | 4 | 0 |
| Total | | 4 | 0 |

== Honours ==
Zeta

- Montenegrin First League: 2006–07

Vojvodina

- Serbian Cup runner-up: 2009–10, 2010–11

Mladost Lučani

- Serbian Cup runner-up: 2017–18

Individual

- Serbian SuperLiga Player of the Week: 2021–22 (Round 22)
