= Oleg Clonin =

Moldovan football player

Personal information
- Date of birth: 4 February 1988 (age 38)
- Place of birth: Chișinău, Moldova
- Height: 1.88 m (6 ft 2 in)
- Positions: Defender; midfielder

Team information
- Current team: FC Ungheni
- Number: 2

Senior career*
Years	Team	Apps	(Gls)
2007–2010	Zimbru Chișinău	42	(0)
2007	→ Zimbru-2 Chișinău	7	(1)
2010–2013	Rapid Ghidighici	50	(3)
2014	Academia Chişinău	12	(0)
2014	Ceahlăul Piatra Neamț	6	(0)
2015	Academia Chișinău	10	(2)
2015–2016	Saxan	4	(0)
2016	Spicul Chișcăreni	?	(?)
2017–	FC Ungheni	2	(0)

International career
2013	Moldova	1	(0)
- * Club domestic league appearances and goals as of 13 April 2017 (UTC)

Oleg Clonin (born 4 February 1988) is a Moldovan football player who plays for FC Ungheni. In 2013, he made his debut in a match against Kyrgyzstan national football team.
