= Radu Catan =

Moldovan professional football player

Personal information
- Full name: Radu Catan
- Date of birth: 30 May 1989 (age 37)
- Place of birth: Chișinău, Moldova
- Height: 1.76 m (5 ft 9 1/2 in)
- Position: Midfielder

Team information
- Current team: FC Zimbru Chișinău
- Number: 30

Youth career
- FC Zimbru Chișinău

Senior career*
| Years | Team | Apps | (Gls) |
| 2007–2014 | FC Zimbru Chișinău | 94 | (22) |
| 2015 | FC Saxan | 6 | (0) |

International career^{‡}
| | Moldova U17 | 6 | (0) |
| | Moldova U19 | 6 | (2) |
| | Moldova U21 | 1 | (0) |
| 2011–2013 | Moldova | 3 | (0) |
- * Club domestic league appearances and goals as of 6 November 2013 ‡ National team caps and goals as of 6 November 2013

Radu Catan (born May 30, 1989, Chișinău, Moldova), is a Moldovan professional football player who currently plays for FC Zimbru Chișinău in the Moldovan National Division.

== Honours ==
Zimbru Chișinău

- Moldovan Cup (1): 2013–14
- Moldovan Super Cup (1): 2014
