= Aleksei Lyubushkin =

Russian footballer

Personal information
- Full name: Aleksei Sergeyevich Lyubushkin
- Date of birth: 25 January 1990 (age 36)
- Height: 1.79 m (5 ft 10 1/2 in)
- Position: Defender

Senior career*
Years	Team	Apps	(Gls)
2008	FC Torpedo Moscow	1	(0)
2009	DYuSSh #80 Moscow		
2010	FC Sportakademklub Moscow	17	(0)
2011	FC Sportakademklub Moscow (amateur)		
2011–2012	FC Academia Chișinău	10	(1)
2012–2013	FC Veris Sîngerei		
- * Club domestic league appearances and goals

Aleksei Sergeyevich Lyubushkin (Russian: Алексей Серге́евич Любушкин; born 25 January 1990) is a former Russian professional football player.

== Club career ==
He made his Russian Football National League debut for FC Torpedo Moscow on 8 May 2008 in a game against FC Dynamo Bryansk.
