= 2010–11 FC Sheriff Tiraspol season =

Sheriff Tiraspol
2010–11 season
- Manager: Andrei Sosnitskiy
- Stadium: Sheriff Stadium
- Divizia Naţională: 2nd
- Moldovan Cup: Semi-final
- Champions League: Play-off round
- Top goalscorer: League: Amath Diedhiou (13); All: Amath Diedhiou (14)
Home colours	Away colours

The 2010–11 season was FC Sheriff Tiraspol's 14th season, and their 13th in the Divizia Naţională, the top-flight of Moldovan football.

== Squad ==
As of match played 22 May 2011

No.	Name	Nationality	Position	Date of birth (age)	Signed from	Signed in	Contract ends	Apps.	Goals
Goalkeepers
1	Alexandru Melenciuc	(Moldova)	GK	20 March 1979 (aged 32)	Sheriff Tiraspol	2011			
12	Dmitri Stajila	(Moldova)	GK	5 February 1990 (aged 21)		2007			
25	Vladislav Stoyanov	(Bulgaria)	GK	8 June 1987 (aged 23)	Chernomorets Burgas	2010			
Defenders
4	Vadim Costandachi	(Moldova)	DF	22 September 1991 (aged 19)	Trainee	2009			
5	Vazha Tarkhnishvili	(Georgia (country))	DF	25 August 1971 (aged 39)	Locomotive Tbilisi	1999			
6	Alexandru Scripcenco	(Moldova)	DF	13 January 1991 (aged 20)		2009			
13	Serghei Diulgher	(Moldova)	DF	21 March 1991 (aged 20)	Trainee	2008			
15	Jasmin Mecinović	(North Macedonia)	DF	22 October 1990 (aged 20)	Skopje	2011		9	0
16	Artyom Khachaturov	(Moldova)	DF	18 June 1992 (aged 18)	Trainee	2009			
20	Ghandi Kassenu	(Ghana)	DF	9 August 1989 (aged 21)	Liberty Professionals	2011		19	1
26	Miral Samardžić	(Slovenia)	DF	17 February 1987 (aged 24)	Maribor	2010			
30	Vladimir Branković	(Serbia)	DF	22 September 1985 (aged 25)	Partizan	2009			
Midfielders
3	Vladimir Volkov	(Serbia)	MF	6 June 1986 (aged 24)	OFK Beograd	2009			
8	Serghei Gheorghiev	(Moldova)	MF	20 October 1991 (aged 19)	Trainee	2008			
14	Wilfried Balima	(Burkina Faso)	MF	20 March 1985 (aged 26)	US Ouagadougou	2005			
17	Florent Rouamba	(Burkina Faso)	MF	31 December 1986 (aged 24)	ASFA Yennenga	2006			
22	Abu Tommy	(Sierra Leone)	MF	13 October 1989 (aged 21)	Mighty Blackpool	2011		11	1
24	Vadim Rață	(Moldova)	MF	5 May 1993 (aged 18)	Trainee	2010		14	0
27	Anatol Cheptine	(Moldova)	MF	20 May 1990 (aged 21)	Tiraspol	2011		19	3
33	Nail Zamaliyev	(Russia)	MF	9 July 1989 (aged 21)	Dynamo Moscow	2011		19	4
	Luis Antonio Rodríguez	(Argentina)	MF	4 March 1985 (aged 26)	Temperley	2008			
Forwards
9	Jymmy	(Brazil)	FW	15 April 1984 (aged 27)	Spartak Trnava	2009			
10	Aleksandar Pešić	(Serbia)	FW	21 May 1992 (aged 19)	OFI	2011		12	5
19	Dalibor Volaš	(Slovenia)	FW	27 February 1987 (aged 24)	Maribor	2011		12	4
21	Amath Diedhiou	(Senegal)	FW	19 November 1989 (aged 21)		2009			
	Igor Dima	(Moldova)	FW	11 February 1993 (aged 18)	Trainee	2010		1	0
	Iurie Mîrza	(Moldova)	FW	5 March 1993 (aged 18)	Trainee	2010		1	1
Players away on loan
27	Vitalie Bulat	(Moldova)	MF	14 September 1987 (aged 23)	Trainee	2003			
28	Nadson	(Brazil)	DF	18 October 1984 (aged 26)	Nacional	2005			
44	Miloš Adamović	(Serbia)	MF	19 June 1988 (aged 22)	OFK Beograd	2010			
	Djibril Paye	(Guinea)	DF	26 February 1990 (aged 21)		2008			
	Constantin Mandrîcenco	(Moldova)	FW	19 February 1991 (aged 20)	Trainee	2008			
Left during the season
7	Baćo Nikolić	(Montenegro)	MF	19 January 1986 (aged 25)	Lovćen	2009			
10	Aleksandr Yerokhin	(Russia)	MF	13 October 1989 (aged 21)	Lokomotiv Moscow	2007			
11	Edgars Gauračs	(Latvia)	FW	10 March 1988 (aged 23)	Ventspils	2010		18	11
15	Ognjen Vranješ	(Bosnia and Herzegovina)	DF	27 October 1989 (aged 21)	loan from Red Star Belgrade	2010	2010	21	0
19	Marko Đurović	(Montenegro)	MF	8 May 1988 (aged 23)	Lovćen	2010			
22	Fred	(Brazil)	MF	22 July 1986 (aged 24)					
23	Eduard Hoderean	(Moldova)	MF	7 January 1990 (aged 21)	Trainee	2009			
	Ihar Karpovich	(Belarus)	DF	2 August 1988 (aged 22)	Lida	2007			
	Rustam Tsynya	(Ukraine)	DF	17 June 1991 (aged 19)	Chornomorets Odesa	2007			
	Yevhen Zarichnyuk	(Ukraine)	DF	3 February 1989 (aged 22)		2011		2	0

=== Out on loan ===
Note: Flags indicate national team as defined under FIFA eligibility rules; some limited exceptions apply. Players may hold more than one non-FIFA nationality.

No.	Pos.	Nation	Player
27	DF	MDA	Vitalie Bulat (at Tiraspol)
28	DF	BRA	Nadson (at Genk)
44	MF	SRB	Miloš Adamović (at Polonia Warsaw)

No.	Pos.	Nation	Player
—	DF	GUI	Djibril Paye (at Tiraspol)
—	FW	MDA	Constantin Mandrîcenco (at Mika)

== Transfer ==
=== In ===
Date	Position	Nationality	Name	From	Fee	Ref.
Summer 2010	DF	(Mali)	Sékou Doumbia	ES Zarzis	Undisclosed	
Summer 2010	MF	(Moldova)	Vadim Rață	Youth Team	Undisclosed	
Summer 2010	FW	(Latvia)	Edgars Gauračs	Ventspils	Undisclosed	
Winter 2011	DF	(Ghana)	Ghandi Kassenu	Liberty Professionals	Undisclosed	
Winter 2011	DF	(North Macedonia)	Jasmin Mecinović	Skopje	Undisclosed	
Winter 2011	FW	(Serbia)	Aleksandar Pešić	OFI	Undisclosed	
Winter 2011	FW	(Slovenia)	Dalibor Volaš	Maribor	Undisclosed	
Winter 2011	MF	(Sierra Leone)	Abu Tommy	Mighty Blackpool	Undisclosed	
Winter 2011	MF	(Moldova)	Anatol Cheptine	Tiraspol	Undisclosed	
Winter 2011	MF	(Russia)	Nail Zamaliyev	Dynamo Moscow	Undisclosed	
Winter 2011	MF	(Russia)	Yuri Petrakov	Dynamo Moscow	Undisclosed	
Winter 2011	MF	(Russia)	Andrei Vavilchenkov	Ural Sverdlovsk	Undisclosed	
Winter 2011	FW	(Russia)	Constantin Iavorschi	Rostov	Undisclosed	

=== Out ===
Date	Position	Nationality	Name	To	Fee	Ref.
Summer 2010	DF	(Romania)	Constantin Arbănaș	Khazar Lankaran	Undisclosed	
Summer 2010	MF	(Montenegro)	Žarko Korać	Zeta	Undisclosed	
Winter 2011	DF	(Montenegro)	Baćo Nikolić	Grbalj	Undisclosed	
Winter 2011	MF	(Montenegro)	Marko Đurović	Mogren	Undisclosed	
Winter 2011	MF	(Russia)	Aleksandr Yerokhin	Krasnodar	Undisclosed	
Winter 2011	FW	(Latvia)	Edgars Gauračs	Yenisey Krasnoyarsk	Undisclosed	
Winter 2011	DF	(Ukraine)	Rustam Tsynya	Tiraspol	Undisclosed	
Winter 2011	MF	(Brazil)	Fred	Tiraspol	Undisclosed	
Winter 2011	MF	(Moldova)	Eduard Hoderean	Tiraspol	Undisclosed	
Winter 2011	DF	(Belarus)	Ihar Karpovich	Naftan Novopolotsk	Undisclosed	

=== Loans in ===
Date from	Position	Nationality	Name	From	Date to	Ref.
Summer 2010	DF	(Bosnia and Herzegovina)	Ognjen Vranješ	Red Star Belgrade	Winter 2011	

=== Loans out ===
Date from	Position	Nationality	Name	To	Date to	Ref.
Summer 2009	DF	(Guinea)	Djibril Paye	Tiraspol	End of Season	
Winter 2010	DF	(Belarus)	Ihar Karpovich	Partizan Minsk	Winter 2011	
Summer 2010	DF	(Argentina)	Luis Antonio Rodríguez	Djurgården	Winter 2011	
Summer 2010	DF	(Moldova)	Vitalie Bulat	Iskra-Stal	Winter 2011	
Winter 2011	DF	(Brazil)	Nadson	Genk	End of Season	
Winter 2011	DF	(Moldova)	Vitalie Bulat	Tiraspol	End of Season	
Winter 2011	MF	(Moldova)	Constantin Mandrîcenco	Mika	End of Season	
Winter 2011	MF	(Serbia)	Miloš Adamović	Polonia Warsaw	End of Season	

=== Released ===
Date	Position	Nationality	Name	Joined	Date
1 July 2010	GK	(Moldova)	Alexandru Melenciuc	Sheriff Tiraspol	1 January 2011
1 January 2011	DF	(Mali)	Sékou Doumbia	CS Hammam-Lif	6 January 2012

== Competitions ==
=== Divizia Națională ===
==== Results summary ====
Overall								Home						Away					
Pld	W	D	L	GF	GA	GD	Pts	W	D	L	GF	GA	GD	W	D	L	GF	GA	GD
39	24	11	4	81	16	+65	83	16	4	0	48	7	+41	8	7	4	33	9	+24

Last updated: 22 May 2011.
Source: See Results

==== Results ====
24 July 2010 1	Sheriff Tiraspol	3–0	Tiraspol	Tiraspol
19:00 EEST (UTC+3)	Khachaturov 48'; E.Hoderean 52'; Jymmy 75'	Report	Y.Siniţchih (yellow card) 72'	Stadium: Malaya Sportivnaya Arena; Attendance: 200; Referee: Petru Stoianov

1 August 2010 2	Olimpia Bălți	0–0	Sheriff Tiraspol	Bălți
18:00 EEST (UTC+3)	V.Verbețchi (yellow card) 34'; T.Kourouma (yellow card) 68'	Report	Gheorghiev (yellow card) 44'; Khachaturov (yellow card) 77'	Stadium: Stadionul Orășenesc; Attendance: 5,900; Referee: Gabriel Tupicico

7 August 2010 3	Sheriff Tiraspol	1–0	Nistru Otaci	Tiraspol
19:00 EEST (UTC+3)	Đurović 2'	Report	Dolgov (yellow card) 60'	Stadium: Malaya Sportivnaya Arena; Attendance: 100; Referee: Ruslan Muntean

14 August 2010 4	Dacia Chișinău	0–0	Sheriff Tiraspol	Chișinău
18:30 EEST (UTC+3)	Bulat (yellow card) 30'	Report	Adamović (yellow card) 56'; Volkov (yellow card) 58'; Đurović (yellow card) 90'	Stadium: Dinamo Stadium; Attendance: 3,000; Referee: Veaceslav Banari

21 August 2010 5	Sheriff Tiraspol	1–1	Costuleni	Tiraspol
19:00 EEST (UTC+3)	Samardžić 53' (yellow card) 89'; Khachaturov (yellow card) 57'; Rață (yellow card) 68'	Report	E.Tomaşcov 34'; M.Bogacic (yellow card) 60'; A.Melnic (yellow card) 65'; I.Castraveţ (yellow card) 90+4'	Stadium: Malaya Sportivnaya Arena; Attendance: 150; Referee: Ion Arnaut

29 August 2010 7	Sheriff Tiraspol	3–0	Gagauziya-Oguzsport	Tiraspol
18:00 EEST (UTC+3)	Adamović (yellow card) 24'; Volkov 35'; Tarkhnishvili (yellow card) 41'; Samardžić 45+1'; Vranješ (yellow card) 63'; Gheorghiev 88'; Nikolić (yellow card) 90+2'	Report	Cojusea (yellow card) 33'; I.Mostovei (yellow card) 37'; Stoleru (yellow card) 60'; P.Marcov (yellow card) 83'; I.Tatar (yellow card) 90+3'	Stadium: Malaya Sportivnaya Arena; Attendance: 100; Referee: Gabriel Tupicico

11 September 2010 8	Sheriff Tiraspol	2–0	Dinamo Bender	Tiraspol
18:00 EEST (UTC+3)	Jymmy 14'; Adamović 28'	Report	E.Ţiverenco (yellow card) 27'; S.Agafonov (yellow card) 34'	Stadium: Sheriff Stadium; Attendance: 2,000; Referee: Vladislav Ivancenco

22 September 2010 6	Academia Chișinău	1–0	Sheriff Tiraspol	Chișinău
16:00 EEST (UTC+3)	Gînsari 29' (yellow card) 35'; Lambarschi (yellow card) 31'	Report	Khachaturov (yellow card) 78'; Rouamba (yellow card) 90+1'	Stadium: Dinamo Stadium; Attendance: 750; Referee: Ghenadie Sidenco

26 September 2010 10	Sheriff Tiraspol	4–0	Sfântul Gheorghe	Tiraspol
19:00 EEST (UTC+3)	Diedhiou 29'; Gauračs 45', 57', 81'; Vranješ (yellow card) 82'	Report	A.Prepeliţă (yellow card) 50'	Stadium: Sheriff Stadium; Attendance: 1,000; Referee: Gheorghe Malinovschii

3 October 2010 11	Zimbru Chișinău	1–1	Sheriff Tiraspol	Chișinău
15:00 EEST (UTC+3)	Salifu 24'; P.Hvorosteanov (yellow card) 70'	Report	Samardžić (yellow card) 23'; Gheorghiev 36'; Vranješ (yellow card) 60'; Branković (yellow card) 80'	Stadium: Zimbru Stadium; Attendance: 5,000; Referee: Petru Stoianov

10 October 2010 9	CSCA-Rapid Chişinău	1–1	Sheriff Tiraspol	Ghidighici
15:00 EEST (UTC+3)	Manaliu (yellow card) 25'; Luca 45'; Franțuz (yellow card) 65'; Livandovschi (yellow card) 71'	Report	Gheorghiev 11'; Nikolić (yellow card) 63'; Branković (yellow card) 64'	Stadium: Ghidighici Stadium; Attendance: 1,000; Referee: Vladislav Ivancenco

16 October 2010 12	Sheriff Tiraspol	2–0	Milsami Orhei	Tiraspol
18:00 EEST (UTC+3)	Yerokhin 34'; Diedhiou 51'; Rouamba (yellow card) 81'; Stoyanov (yellow card) 81'	Report	Osipenco (yellow card) 65'	Stadium: Sheriff Stadium; Attendance: 1,000; Referee: Veaceslav Banari

25 October 2010 13	Iskra-Stal	0–1	Sheriff Tiraspol	Rîbnița
15:00 EEST (UTC+3)	Feshchenko (yellow card) 48'	Report	Yerokhin 47'; Balima (yellow card) 56'	Stadium: Stadionul Orășenesc; Attendance: 1,000; Referee: Iurie Covtun

31 October 2010 14	Tiraspol	0–3	Sheriff Tiraspol	Tiraspol
18:00 EET (UTC+2)	V.Lebedynskyi (yellow card) 68'; R.Golovanov (yellow card) 71'	Report	Gheorghiev 49'; Balima 67'; Volkov 71' (pen.)	Stadium: Sheriff Stadium; Attendance: 600; Referee: Dmitri Muntean

7 November 2010 15	Sheriff Tiraspol	1–1	Olimpia Bălți	Tiraspol
17:00 EET (UTC+2)	Adamović (penalty missed) 27'; Gauračs 30' (yellow card) 48'	Report	S.Gusacov (yellow card) 27'; Adaramola 54' (yellow card) 56'; T.Kourouma (yellow card) 81'	Stadium: Sheriff Stadium; Attendance: 2,500; Referee: Gheorghe Malinovschii

14 November 2010 16	Nistru Otaci	0–3	Sheriff Tiraspol	Călărășeuca
14:00 EET (UTC+2)	S.Marin (yellow card) 50'; A.Caragea (yellow card) 68'	Report	Tarkhnishvili 45' (pen.); Yerokhin (yellow card) 50' (goal) 66', 83'; Gheorghiev (yellow card) 52'	Stadium: Călărășeuca Stadium; Attendance: 500; Referee: Vadim Dedeniov

20 November 2010 17	Sheriff Tiraspol	3–0	Dacia Chișinău	Tiraspol
17:00 EET (UTC+2)	Jymmy 12' (yellow card) 40'; Yerokhin 16'; Branković (yellow card) 19' (goal) 73'; Diedhiou (yellow card) 44'; Volkov (yellow card) 88'	Report	Lomidze (yellow card) 65'; E.Matiughin (yellow card) 71'	Stadium: Sheriff Stadium; Attendance: 4,000; Referee: Veaceslav Banari

28 November 2010 18	Costuleni	0–0	Sheriff Tiraspol	Orhei
13:00 EET (UTC+2)	D.Orbu (yellow card) 12'; Cabac (yellow card) 81'; A.Melnic (yellow card) 90+1'	Report	Jymmy (penalty missed) 49'; Volkov (yellow card) 81'	Stadium: CSR Orhei; Attendance: 600; Referee: Gabriel Tupicico

6 December 2010 19	Sheriff Tiraspol	1–1	Academia Chișinău	Tiraspol
13:00 EET (UTC+2)	Diedhiou 16'; Adamović (yellow card) 23' (yellow-red card) 88'; Vranješ (yellow card) 75'; Yerokhin (yellow card) 90'	Report	Leucă 24'	Stadium: Sheriff Stadium; Attendance: 300; Referee: Petru Stoianov

11 December 2010 20	Gagauziya-Oguzsport	0–4	Sheriff Tiraspol	Vadul lui Vodă
13:00 EET (UTC+2)	I.Mostovei (yellow card) 88'	Report	Volkov 20'; Yerokhin 55'; Jymmy 59'; Gauračs 82'; Gheorghiev (penalty missed) 89'	Stadium: Stadionul CPSM; Attendance: 200; Referee: Gheorghe Malinovschii

18 December 2010 21	Dinamo Bender	0–7	Sheriff Tiraspol	Tiraspol
15:00 EET (UTC+2)		Report	Gauračs 19', 22', 53', 63', 89'; Gheorghiev 39'; Volkov 63'; Samardžić (penalty missed) 69'	Stadium: Krytyj futbolnyj Manesh; Attendance: 300; Referee: Vladislav Ivancenco

16 February 2011 22	Sheriff Tiraspol	4–0	CSCA-Rapid Chişinău	Tiraspol
17:00 EET (UTC+2)	Volaš 14'; Cheptine (yellow card) 45' (goal) 70'; Zamaliyev 47'; Pešić 90'	Report		Stadium: Krytyj futbolnyj Manesh; Attendance: 1,500; Referee: Ghenadie Sidenco

21 February 2011 23	Sfântul Gheorghe	1–1	Sheriff Tiraspol	Chișinău
13:00 EET (UTC+2)	Ojog (yellow card) 40'	Report	Mecinović (yellow card) 29'; Zamaliyev 55'	Stadium: Stadionul CPTF; Attendance: 300; Referee: Gheorghe Malinovschii

26 February 2011 24	Sheriff Tiraspol	1–0	Zimbru Chișinău	Tiraspol
17:00 EET (UTC+2)	Pešić (yellow card) 40' (goal) 90'	Report	V.Cravcescu (yellow card) 18'; A.Kovalevsky (yellow card) 40'; Salifu (yellow card) 78'	Stadium: Krytyj futbolnyj Manesh; Attendance: 2,900; Referee: Ghenadie Sidenco

2 March 2011 25	Milsami Orhei	0–1	Sheriff Tiraspol	Vadul lui Vodă
13:00 EET (UTC+2)	Ademar (yellow card) 36' (yellow-red card) 45'; Furdui (yellow card) 66'; Sosnovschi (yellow card) 81'	Report	Pešić 62' (yellow card) 90+1'; Kassenu (yellow card) 90'	Stadium: Stadionul CPSM; Attendance: 700; Referee: Vadim Dedeniov

6 March 2011 26	Sheriff Tiraspol	1–0	Iskra-Stal	Tiraspol
17:00 EET (UTC+2)	Pešić (yellow card) 45+1' (goal) 58'; Diedhiou (yellow card) 90+3'	Report	Novicov (yellow card) 25'; N.Mincev (yellow card) 58'; Țaranu (yellow card) 87'	Stadium: Krytyj futbolnyj Manesh; Attendance: 1,000; Referee: Igor Şaţchii

12 March 2011 27	Sheriff Tiraspol	5–1	Gagauziya-Oguzsport	Tiraspol
17:00 EET (UTC+2)	Diedhiou 37', 70', 90'; Tarkhnishvili 51' (pen.); Volaš 59'; Rouamba (yellow card) 62'	Report	I.Mostovei (yellow card) 39'; Cojusea 80' (pen.); I.Uzun (yellow card) 84'	Stadium: Krytyj futbolnyj Manesh; Attendance: 2,500; Referee: Vladislav Ivancenco

16 March 2011 28	Dacia Chișinău	1–1	Sheriff Tiraspol	Chișinău
13:00 EET (UTC+2)	Collins (yellow card) 63'; Korgalidze 88'	Report	Cheptine 18' (yellow card) 43'; Zamaliyev (yellow card) 79'; Volkov (yellow card) 84'	Stadium: Dinamo Stadium; Attendance: 2,500; Referee: Veaceslav Banari

20 March 2011 29	Sheriff Tiraspol	6–0	Sfântul Gheorghe	Tiraspol
17:00 EET (UTC+2)	Zamaliyev 23' (yellow card) 67'; Mecinović (yellow card) 46'; Gheorghiev 47'; Branković 62' (yellow card) 69'; Volaš 79'; Balima 84', 89'	Report	A.Prepeliţă (yellow card) 21'; Dolgov (yellow card) 40'	Stadium: Krytyj futbolnyj Manesh; Attendance: 2,000; Referee: Victor Gheciu

2 April 2011 30	Sheriff Tiraspol	2–1	Milsami Orhei	Tiraspol
17:00 EEST (UTC+3)	Jymmy 23'; Kassenu 45'; Rouamba (yellow card) 84'; Tarkhnishvili (yellow card) 86'	Report	Mboussi (red card) 33'; Gârlă (yellow card) 38'; Boghiu 56'; Golban (yellow card) 86'; Ademar (yellow card) 90+3'	Stadium: Krytyj futbolnyj Manesh; Attendance: 3,000; Referee: Igor Şaţchii

6 April 2011 31	Olimpia Bălți	1–0	Sheriff Tiraspol	Bălți
17:00 EEST (UTC+3)	Cheltuială (yellow card) 5'; Lichioiu (red card) 62'; Ogada 65'	Report	Balima (red card) 62'	Stadium: Stadionul Orășenesc; Attendance: 4,000; Referee: Petru Stoianov

10 April 2011 32	Sheriff Tiraspol	2–1	Iskra-Stal	Tiraspol
17:00 EEST (UTC+3)	Cheptine 47'; Pešić 67' (yellow card) 87'	Report	Suchu 34'; N.Rudac (yellow card) 51'; N.Mincev (yellow card) 86'	Stadium: Sheriff Stadium; Attendance: 1,000; Referee: Vladislav Ivancenco

16 April 2011 33	Zimbru Chișinău	1–0	Sheriff Tiraspol	Chișinău
15:00 EEST (UTC+3)	A.Kovalevsky (yellow card) 63'; Șișchin 90+3'	Report	Cheptine (yellow card) 68'	Stadium: Stadionul CPTF; Attendance: 900; Referee: Gabriel Tupicico

23 April 2011 34	Sheriff Tiraspol	2–1	CSCA-Rapid Chişinău	Tiraspol
17:00 EEST (UTC+3)	Diedhiou 13'; Volaš 90+2'	Report	Pașcenco 27'; Clonin (yellow card) 35'; Franțuz (yellow card) 36'; Rusu (yellow card) 90+2'; Tofan (red card) 90+3'	Stadium: Sheriff Stadium; Attendance: 1,000; Referee: Gabriel Tupicico

26 April 2011 35	Academia Chișinău	1–0	Sheriff Tiraspol	Chișinău
16:00 EEST (UTC+3)	V.Dîmov (yellow card) 43'; Cașcaval 58'; Potîrniche (yellow card) 64'; Ochincă (yellow card) 73'; A.Chiciuc (yellow card) 86'	Report		Stadium: Dinamo Stadium; Attendance: 600; Referee: Victor Gheciu

8 May 2011 36	Sheriff Tiraspol	0–0	Tiraspol	Tiraspol
18:00 EEST (UTC+3)	Samardžić (yellow card) 61'	Report	C.Omoseibi (yellow card) 65'; V.Kalinichenko (yellow card) 90+2'	Stadium: Sheriff Stadium; Attendance: 3,000; Referee: Dmitri Muntean

13 May 2011 37	Dinamo Bender	0–7	Sheriff Tiraspol	Bender
17:00 EEST (UTC+3)		Report	Balima 29', 32', 70'; Diedhiou 43', 63'; Zamaliyev 65' (yellow card) 80'; A.Bădărlan 85' (o.g.)	Stadium: Stadionul Şelkovic; Attendance: 200; Referee: Alexandr Tean

17 May 2011 38	Sheriff Tiraspol	4–0	Costuleni	Tiraspol
17:00 EEST (UTC+3)	Diedhiou 23', 63', 71', 90+1'	Report		Stadium: Sheriff Stadium; Attendance: 1,000; Referee: Victor Gheciu

22 May 2011 39	Nistru Otaci	1–3	Sheriff Tiraspol	Călărășeuca
17:00 EEST (UTC+3)	G.Tukhashvili (yellow card) 66'; S.Marin (yellow card) 80'; R.Murguleţ 88'	Report	T.Abu 28'; Gheorghiev 40'; Zamaliyev (yellow card) 68'; Mîrza 85'	Stadium: Călărășeuca Stadium; Attendance: 1,000; Referee: Gheorghe Malinovschii

==== League table ====
Pos	Team	Pld	W	D	L	GF	GA	GD	Pts	Qualification or relegation
1	Dacia Chișinău (C)	39	27	11	1	66	16	+50	92	Qualification for the Champions League second qualifying round
2	Sheriff Tiraspol	39	24	11	4	81	16	+65	83	Qualification for the Europa League second qualifying round
3	Milsami Orhei	39	23	9	7	71	23	+48	78	Qualification for the Europa League first qualifying round
4	Zimbru Chișinău	39	22	10	7	56	20	+36	76	
5	Iskra - Stal Rîbnița	39	21	11	7	62	26	+36	74 (Note: ISK: 4 pts, +0 gl; OLI: 4 pts, +0 gl)	Qualification for the Europa League second qualifying round (Note: As winners of the 2010–11 Moldovan Cup.)

Source: Moldovan Football Federation (in Romanian)
Rules for classification: 1st points; 2nd goal difference
For determining final classification: 1st points; 2nd head-to-head points; 3rd head-to-head goal difference; 4th goal difference; 5th number of goals scored; 6th number of wins; 7th Fair Play competition
(C) Champions

=== Moldovan Cup ===
28 October 2010 Third round	Sheriff Tiraspol	3–0	Costuleni	Tiraspol
14:00 EEST (UTC+3)	Gauračs 4'; Nadson 79'; Đurović 85'	Report		Stadium: Sheriff Stadium

10 November 2010 Quarterfinal 1st leg	Tiraspol	2–3	Sheriff Tiraspol	Tiraspol
14:00 EEST (UTC+3)	Cheptine 23'; M.Şoimu 43'	Report	Yerokhin 41', 80'; Diedhiou 84'; Nadson (yellow card) 89'	Stadium: Sheriff Stadium

24 November 2010 Quarterfinal 2nd leg	Sheriff Tiraspol	2–0 (5–3 agg.)	Tiraspol	Tiraspol
13:00 EEST (UTC+3)	Adamović 5'; Jymmy 34'	Report		Stadium: Sheriff Stadium

20 April 2011 Semifinal 1st leg	Sheriff Tiraspol	1–0	Iskra-Stal	Tiraspol
15:00 EEST (UTC+3)	Balima 14'	Report		Stadium: Sheriff Stadium

4 May 2011 Semifinal 2nd leg	Iskra-Stal	3–0 (3–1 agg.)	Sheriff Tiraspol	Rîbnița
14:00 EEST (UTC+3)	N.Rudac 12'; E.Gorodețch 47'; Gheorghiev (yellow card) 55'; Popovici 67'	Report		Stadium: Stadionul Orășenesc

=== UEFA Champions League ===
==== Qualifying rounds ====
14 July 2010 Second qualifying round 1st leg	Sheriff Tiraspol (Moldova)	3–1	(Albania) Dinamo Tirana	Tiraspol, Moldova
20:00 EEST (UTC+3)	Volkov 9' (yellow card) 14'; Nikolić 62' (yellow card) 63'; Nadson 70'	Report	Malacarne 12'; Putinčanin (yellow card) 19'; Diop (yellow card) 20'; García (yellow card) 63'; Bakaj (red card) 68'	Stadium: Sheriff Stadium; Attendance: 6,951; Referee: Daniel Stalhammar (Sweden)

20 July 2010 Second qualifying round 2nd leg	Dinamo Tirana (Albania)	1–0 (2–3 agg.)	(Moldova) Sheriff Tiraspol	Tirana, Albania
19:00 EEST (UTC+3)	Putinčanin (yellow card) 10'; Vila 18' (yellow card) 38'; Sosa (yellow card) 77'	Report	Branković (yellow card) 50'; Fred (yellow card) 70'; Tarkhnishvili (yellow card) 90+2'	Stadium: Qemal Stafa Stadium^{2} Attendance: 3,000; Referee: Leontios Trattou (Cyprus)

28 July 2010 Third qualifying round 1st leg	Sheriff Tiraspol (Moldova)	1–1	(Croatia) Dinamo Zagreb	Tiraspol, Moldova
20:00 EEST (UTC+3)	Erokhin (yellow card) 29' (goal) 35'; Tarkhnishvili (yellow card) 77'	Report	Sammir 3'; Barbarić (yellow card) 53' (yellow-red card) 61'; Calello (yellow card) 90+1'	Stadium: Sheriff Stadium; Attendance: 9,150; Referee: Anastassios Kakos (Greece)

4 August 2010 Third qualifying round 2nd leg	Dinamo Zagreb (Croatia)	1–1 (a.e.t.) (2–2 agg.) (5–6 p)	(Moldova) Sheriff Tiraspol	Zagreb, Croatia
21:00 EEST (UTC+3)	Cufré (yellow card) 31'; Badelj (yellow card) 83'; Sammir 55' (pen.)	Report	Volkov 16'; Fred (yellow card) 37'; Samardžić (yellow card) 54'; Nikolić (yellow card) 79'; Adamović (yellow card) 113'; Stoyanov (yellow card) 119'	Stadium: Stadion Maksimir; Attendance: 7,811; Referee: Eric Braamhaar (Netherlands)
	Penalties
	Bišćan (penalty scored); Sammir (penalty missed); Badelj (penalty missed); Cufré (penalty scored); Ibáñez (penalty scored); Etto (penalty scored); Calello (penalty scored); Vrsaljko (penalty missed); Dodô (penalty missed)		(penalty scored) Samardžić; (penalty missed) Stoyanov; (penalty missed) Volkov; (penalty scored) Jymmy; (penalty scored) Adamović; (penalty scored) Vranješ; (penalty scored) Nikolić; (penalty missed) Branković; (penalty scored) Khachaturov

18 August 2010 Playoff round 1st leg	Basel (Switzerland)	1–0	(Moldova) Sheriff Tiraspol	Basel, Switzerland
21:45 EEST (UTC+3)	Stocker 54'; Zoua (yellow card) 67'	Report	Branković (yellow card) 17'; Samardžić (yellow card) 53'; Rouamba (yellow card) 58'; Yerokhin (yellow card) 76' (yellow-red card) 86'; Vranješ (yellow card) 85'	Stadium: St. Jakob-Park; Attendance: 13,460; Referee: Terje Hauge (Norway)

24 August 2010 Playoff round 2nd leg	Sheriff Tiraspol (Moldova)	0–3 (0–4 agg.)	(Switzerland) Basel	Tiraspol, Moldova
21:45 EEST (UTC+3)	Tarkhnishvili (yellow card) 57' (yellow-red card) 76'; Volkov (yellow card) 71'; Vranješ (yellow card) 85'	Report	Frei (yellow card) 16' (goal) 80', 87'; Atan (yellow card) 40'; Streller 74'	Stadium: Sheriff Stadium; Attendance: 12,300; Referee: Martin Hansson (Sweden)

=== UEFA Europa League ===
==== Group stage ====
Team	Pld	W	D	L	GF	GA	GD	Pts
(Ukraine) Dynamo Kyiv	6	3	2	1	10	6	+4	11
(Belarus) BATE	6	3	1	2	11	11	0	10
(Netherlands) AZ	6	2	1	3	8	10	−2	7
(Moldova) Sheriff Tiraspol	6	1	2	3	5	7	−2	5

16 September 2010 1	AZ (Netherlands)	2–1	(Moldova) Sheriff Tiraspol	Alkmaar, Netherlands
20:45 EEST (UTC+3)	Guðmundsson 14'; Jaliens 83'	Report	Adamović (yellow card) 41'; Yerokhin (yellow card) 58'; Samardžić (yellow card) 62'; Moreno 68' (o.g.)	Stadium: AFAS Stadion; Attendance: 10,624; Referee: Tony Asumaa (Finland)

30 September 2010 2	Sheriff Tiraspol (Moldova)	2–0	(Ukraine) Dynamo Kyiv	Tiraspol, Moldova
22:05 EEST (UTC+3)	Erokhin 8'; Jymmy 37' (pen.); Adamović (yellow card) 57'	Report	Khacheridi (yellow card) 37'; Shevchenko (yellow card) 61'; Milevskyi (yellow card) 81'	Stadium: Sheriff Stadium; Attendance: 12,600; Referee: Jiri Jech (Czech Republic)

21 October 2010 3	Sheriff Tiraspol (Moldova)	0–1	(Belarus) BATE	Tiraspol, Moldova
22:05 EEST (UTC+3)	Tarkhnishvili (yellow card) 19'; Rouamba (yellow card) 48'; Diedhiou (yellow card) 56'	Report	Sosnovski 8'; Bardachow (yellow card) 62'	Stadium: Sheriff Stadium; Attendance: 7,000; Referee: Duarte Gomes (Portugal)

4 November 2010 4	BATE (Belarus)	3–1	(Moldova) Sheriff Tiraspol	Minsk, Belarus
20:00 EET (UTC+2)	Rodionov 15'; Pawlaw 70'; Bressan 75'; Valadzko (yellow card) 90'	Report	Vranješ (yellow card) 20'; Erokhin 32'; Rouamba (yellow card) 45'; Tarkhnishvili (yellow card) 74'	Stadium: Dinamo Stadium^{1} Attendance: 11,500; Referee: Robert Małek (Poland)

2 December 2010 5	Sheriff Tiraspol (Moldova)	1–1	(Netherlands) AZ	Tiraspol, Moldova
22:05 EET (UTC+2)	Rouamba (yellow card) 33' (goal) 54'	Report	Holman 17'	Stadium: Sheriff Stadium; Attendance: 3,500; Referee: Cyril Zimmermann (Switzerland)

15 December 2010 6	Dynamo Kyiv (Ukraine)	0–0	(Moldova) Sheriff Tiraspol	Kyiv, Ukraine
20:00 EET (UTC+2)	Khacheridi (yellow card) 22'; Milevskyi (yellow card) 48'	Report	Jymmy (yellow card) 50'	Stadium: Lobanovsky Dynamo Stadium; Attendance: 10,800; Referee: Knut Kircher (Germany)

== Squad statistics ==
As of Match played 22 May 2011

=== Appearances and goals ===
No.	Pos	Nat	Player	Total		Divizia Națională		Moldovan Cup		Champions League		Europa League	
No.	Pos	Nat	Player	Apps	Goals	Apps	Goals	Apps	Goals	Apps	Goals	Apps	Goals
3	MF	(Serbia) SRB	Vladimir Volkov	28	6	8+8	4	1	0	6	2	4+1	0
4	DF	(Moldova) MDA	Vadim Costandachi	14	0	6+5	0	1+2	0	0	0	0	0
5	DF	(Georgia (country)) GEO	Vazha Tarkhnishvili	45	2	33	2	5	0	4	0	3	0
6	DF	(Moldova) MDA	Alexandru Scripcenco	15	0	6+5	0	1+2	0	0+1	0	0	0
8	MF	(Moldova) MDA	Serghei Gheorghiev	45	7	26+9	7	3+1	0	0+3	0	0+3	0
9	FW	(Brazil) BRA	Jymmy	36	7	20+2	5	4	1	5	0	4+1	1
10	FW	(Serbia) SRB	Aleksandar Pešić	12	5	5+6	5	0+1	0	0	0	0	0
12	GK	(Moldova) MDA	Dmitri Stajila	27	0	22	0	2	0	0	0	2+1	0
13	DF	(Moldova) MDA	Serghei Diulgher	9	0	7+1	0	0+1	0	0	0	0	0
14	DF	(Burkina Faso) BFA	Wilfried Balima	44	7	26+5	6	4+1	1	2	0	6	0
15	DF	(North Macedonia) MKD	Jasmin Mecinović	9	0	3+4	0	2	0	0	0	0	0
16	MF	(Moldova) MDA	Artyom Khachaturov	32	1	18+8	1	1	0	0+4	0	0+1	0
17	MF	(Burkina Faso) BFA	Florent Rouamba	40	1	27+2	0	3+1	0	2	0	5	1
19	FW	(Slovenia) SVN	Dalibor Volaš	12	4	4+8	4	0	0	0	0	0	0
20	DF	(Ghana) GHA	Ghandi Kassenu	19	1	16+1	1	2	0	0	0	0	0
21	FW	(Senegal) SEN	Amath Diedhiou	49	14	26+8	13	3+1	1	4+1	0	5+1	0
22	MF	(Sierra Leone) SLE	Tommy Abu	11	1	9	1	2	0	0	0	0	0
24	MF	(Moldova) MDA	Vadim Rață	14	0	7+6	0	1	0	0	0	0	0
25	GK	(Bulgaria) BUL	Vladislav Stoyanov	31	0	17+1	0	3	0	6	0	4	0
26	DF	(Slovenia) SVN	Miral Samardžić	36	2	21+5	2	1+1	0	3+1	0	3+1	0
27	MF	(Moldova) MDA	Anatol Cheptine	19	3	12+5	3	1+1	0	0	0	0	0
30	DF	(Serbia) SRB	Vladimir Branković	39	2	17+8	2	3	0	5	0	5+1	0
33	MF	(Russia) RUS	Nail Zamaliyev	19	4	16+1	4	1+1	0	0	0	0	0
	FW	(Moldova) MDA	Igor Dima	1	0	0+1	0	0	0	0	0	0	0
	FW	(Moldova) MDA	Iurie Mîrza	1	1	0+1	1	0	0	0	0	0	0
Players away on loan :
28	DF	(Brazil) BRA	Nadson	31	2	15+1	0	1+2	1	6	1	6	0
44	MF	(Serbia) SRB	Miloš Adamović	30	2	10+6	1	2	1	6	0	6	0
Players who left Sheriff Tiraspol during the season:
7	FW	(Montenegro) MNE	Baćo Nikolić	21	1	6+7	0	1	0	2+3	1	1+1	0
10	MF	(Russia) RUS	Aleksandr Yerokhin	31	11	12+6	6	2	2	4+1	1	6	2
11	FW	(Latvia) LVA	Edgars Gauračs	18	11	5+7	10	1	1	0	0	1+4	0
15	DF	(Bosnia and Herzegovina) BIH	Ognjen Vranješ	21	0	9	0	2	0	6	0	4	0
19	MF	(Montenegro) MNE	Marko Đurović	12	2	4+3	1	0+2	1	0+2	0	0+1	0
22	MF	(Brazil) BRA	Fred	21	0	8+4	0	1	0	3+2	0	1+2	0
23	MF	(Moldova) MDA	Eduard Hoderean	8	1	5+3	1	0	0	0	0	0	0
	DF	(Ukraine) UKR	Rustam Tsynya	3	0	3	0	0	0	0	0	0	0
	MF	(Ukraine) UKR	Yevhen Zarichnyuk	2	0	0	0	1+1	0	0	0	0	0

=== Goal scorers ===
Place	Position	Nation	Number	Name	Divizia Națională	Moldovan Cup	Champions League	Europa League	Total
1	FW	(Senegal)	21	Amath Diedhiou	13	1	0	0	14
2	FW	(Latvia)	11	Edgars Gauračs	10	1	0	0	11
2	MF	(Russia)	10	Aleksandr Yerokhin	6	2	1	2	11
4	MF	(Moldova)	8	Serghei Gheorghiev	7	0	0	0	7
4	MF	(Burkina Faso)	14	Wilfried Balima	6	1	0	0	7
4	FW	(Brazil)	9	Jymmy	5	1	0	1	7
7	MF	(Serbia)	3	Vladimir Volkov	4	0	2	0	6
8	FW	(Serbia)	10	Aleksandar Pešić	5	0	0	0	5
9	FW	(Slovenia)	19	Dalibor Volaš	4	0	0	0	4
9	MF	(Russia)	33	Nail Zamaliyev	4	0	0	0	4
11	MF	(Moldova)	27	Anatol Cheptine	3	0	0	0	3
12	DF	(Slovenia)	26	Miral Samardžić	2	0	0	0	2
12	DF	(Georgia (country))	5	Vazha Tarkhnishvili	2	0	0	0	2
12	DF	(Serbia)	30	Vladimir Branković	2	0	0	0	2
12	MF	(Montenegro)	19	Marko Đurović	1	1	0	0	2
12	MF	(Serbia)	44	Miloš Adamović	1	1	0	0	2
12	DF	(Ghana)	20	Ghandi Kassenu	1	1	0	0	2
12	DF	(Brazil)	28	Nadson	0	1	1	0	2
12				Own goal	1	0	0	1	1
20	MF	(Moldova)	16	Artyom Khachaturov	1	0	0	0	1
20	MF	(Moldova)	23	Eduard Hoderean	1	0	0	0	1
20	MF	(Sierra Leone)	22	Tommy Abu	1	0	0	0	1
20	MF	(Moldova)		Iurie Mîrza	1	0	0	0	1
20	FW	(Montenegro)	7	Baćo Nikolić	0	0	1	0	1
20	MF	(Burkina Faso)	17	Florent Rouamba	0	0	0	1	1
				TOTALS	81	9	5	5	100

=== Disciplinary record ===
Number	Nation	Position	Name	Divizia Națională		Moldovan Cup		Champions League		Europa League		Total	
Number	Nation	Position	Name	Booked	Sent off (straight red)	Booked	Sent off (straight red)	Booked	Sent off (straight red)	Booked	Sent off (straight red)	Booked	Sent off (straight red)
3	(Serbia)	MF	Vladimir Volkov	4	0	0	0	2	0	0	0	6	0
5	(Georgia (country))	DF	Vazha Tarkhnishvili	2	0	0	0	4	1	2	0	8	1
7	(Montenegro)	FW	Baćo Nikolić	1	0	0	0	2	0	0	0	3	0
8	(Moldova)	MF	Serghei Gheorghiev	2	0	0	0	0	0	0	0	2	0
9	(Brazil)	FW	Jymmy	1	0	0	0	0	0	1	0	2	0
10	(Serbia)	FW	Aleksandar Pešić	4	0	0	0	0	0	0	0	4	0
14	(Burkina Faso)	DF	Wilfried Balima	1	1	0	0	0	0	0	0	1	1
15	(North Macedonia)	DF	Jasmin Mecinović	2	0	0	0	0	0	0	0	2	0
16	(Moldova)	DF	Artyom Khachaturov	3	0	0	0	0	0	0	0	3	0
17	(Burkina Faso)	MF	Florent Rouamba	4	0	0	0	1	0	3	0	8	0
20	(Ghana)	DF	Ghandi Kassenu	1	0	0	0	0	0	0	0	1	0
21	(Senegal)	FW	Amath Diedhiou	2	0	0	0	0	0	1	0	3	0
24	(Moldova)	MF	Vadim Rață	1	0	0	0	0	0	0	0	1	0
25	(Bulgaria)	GK	Vladislav Stoyanov	1	0	0	0	1	0	0	0	2	0
26	(Slovenia)	DF	Miral Samardžić	3	0	0	0	2	0	1	0	6	0
27	(Moldova)	MF	Anatol Cheptine	3	0	0	0	0	0	0	0	3	0
30	(Serbia)	MF	Vladimir Branković	4	0	0	0	2	0	0	0	6	0
33	(Russia)	MF	Nail Zamaliyev	4	0	0	0	0	0	0	0	4	0
Players away from Sheriff Tiraspol on loan:
44	(Serbia)	MF	Miloš Adamović	4	1	0	0	1	0	2	0	7	1
Players who left Sheriff Tiraspol during the season:
7	(Montenegro)	FW	Baćo Nikolić	2	0	0	0	2	0	0	0	4	0
10	(Russia)	MF	Aleksandr Yerokhin	2	0	0	0	3	1	1	0	6	1
11	(Latvia)	FW	Edgars Gauračs	1	0	0	0	0	0	0	0	1	0
15	(Bosnia and Herzegovina)	DF	Ognjen Vranješ	4	0	0	0	2	0	1	0	7	0
19	(Montenegro)	MF	Marko Đurović	1	0	0	0	0	0	0	0	1	0
22	(Brazil)	MF	Fred	0	0	0	0	2	0	0	0	2	0
			TOTALS	57	2	0	0	22	2	12	0	91	4

== Notes ==
- Note 1: BATE played their group matches in Minsk at Dinamo Stadium as BATE's Haradski Stadium did not meet UEFA criteria.
- Note 2: Played in Tirana at Qemal Stafa Stadium as Dinamo Tirana's Selman Stërmasi Stadium did not meet UEFA criteria.
