= 2011–12 FC Sheriff Tiraspol season =

Sheriff Tiraspol
2011–12 season
- Manager: Vitali Rashkevich
- Stadium: Sheriff Stadium
- Divizia Naţională: 1st
- Moldovan Cup: Semi-final
- Europa League: Second qualifying round
- Top goalscorer: League: Wilfried Balima (18); All: Wilfried Balima (18)
Home colours	Away colours

The 2011–12 season was FC Sheriff Tiraspol's 15th season, and their 14th in the Divizia Naţională, the top-flight of Moldovan football.

== Squad ==
As of match played 23 May 2012

No.	Name	Nationality	Position	Date of birth (age)	Signed from	Signed in	Contract ends	Apps.	Goals
Goalkeepers
1	Alexandru Zveaghințev	(Moldova)	GK	26 July 1987 (aged 24)	Tiraspol	2011		16	0
12	Dmitri Stajila	(Moldova)	GK	2 August 1991 (aged 20)	Trainee	2007			
25	Vladislav Stoyanov	(Bulgaria)	GK	8 June 1987 (aged 24)	Chernomorets Burgas	2010			
Defenders
3	João Pereira	(Portugal)	DF	10 May 1990 (aged 22)	Beira-Mar	2012		9	0
4	Vadim Costandachi	(Moldova)	DF	22 September 1991 (aged 20)	Trainee	2009			
5	Vazha Tarkhnishvili	(Georgia (country))	DF	25 August 1971 (aged 40)	Locomotive Tbilisi	1999			
15	Marcel Metoua	(Ivory Coast)	DF	15 November 1988 (aged 23)	Banat Zrenjanin	2011		36	3
16	Leonel Morales	(Bolivia)	DF	2 September 1988 (aged 23)	loan from Universitario de Sucre	2012		12	0
18	Artyom Khachaturov	(Moldova)	DF	18 June 1992 (aged 19)	Trainee	2009			
26	Miral Samardžić	(Slovenia)	DF	17 February 1987 (aged 25)	Maribor	2010			
Midfielders
7	Vitalie Bulat	(Moldova)	MF	14 September 1987 (aged 24)	Trainee	2003			
8	Serghei Gheorghiev	(Moldova)	MF	20 October 1991 (aged 20)	Trainee	2008			
14	Wilfried Balima	(Burkina Faso)	MF	20 March 1985 (aged 27)	US Ouagadougou	2005			
17	Florent Rouamba	(Burkina Faso)	MF	31 December 1986 (aged 25)	ASFA Yennenga	2006			
20	José Coelho	(Portugal)	MF	4 February 1990 (aged 22)	Benfica	2012		13	0
22	Abu Tommy	(Sierra Leone)	MF	13 October 1989 (aged 22)	Mighty Blackpool	2011		30	3
28	Vadim Rață	(Moldova)	MF	5 May 1993 (aged 19)	Trainee	2010		40	1
33	Nail Zamaliyev	(Russia)	MF	9 July 1989 (aged 22)	Dynamo Moscow	2010		47	7
77	Anatol Cheptine	(Moldova)	MF	20 May 1990 (aged 22)	Tiraspol	2011		50	10
	Alexandru Dedov	(Moldova)	MF	26 July 1989 (aged 22)	Dacia Chișinău	2011		15	1
	Veaceslav Lisa	(Moldova)	MF	24 May 1993 (aged 18)	Trainee	2011		5	0
	Alexandru Onica	(Moldova)	MF	29 July 1984 (aged 27)	Vorskla Poltava	2012		15	0
	Igor Poiarcov	(Moldova)	MF	27 June 1994 (aged 17)	Trainee	2011		3	0
Forwards
9	Darwin Ríos	(Bolivia)	FW	25 April 1991 (aged 21)	Guabirá	2012		13	3
10	Aleksandar Pešić	(Serbia)	FW	21 May 1992 (aged 20)	OFI Crete	2010		37	19
23	Jhonatan	(Brazil)	FW	31 January 1989 (aged 23)	Paranaense	2011		20	4
90	Luvannor	(Brazil)	FW	19 May 1990 (aged 22)	Morrinhos	2011		30	12
	Igor Dima	(Moldova)	FW	11 February 1993 (aged 19)	Trainee	2010		4	0
Players away on loan
13	Serghei Diulgher	(Moldova)	DF	21 March 1991 (aged 21)	Trainee	2008			
19	Dalibor Volaš	(Slovenia)	FW	27 February 1987 (aged 25)	Maribor	2011		12	4
	Djibril Paye	(Guinea)	DF	26 February 1990 (aged 22)		2008			
Left during the season
9	Jymmy	(Brazil)	FW	15 April 1984 (aged 28)	Spartak Trnava	2009			
19	David Cortés	(Colombia)	FW	1 May 1992 (aged 20)	loan from Jelgava	2011	2011	3	2
20	Ghandi Kassenu	(Ghana)	DF	9 August 1989 (aged 22)	Liberty Professionals	2011		39	1
27	Rafael Sosa	(Argentina)	MF	7 May 1988 (aged 24)	Skënderbeu Korçë	2011		13	2

=== Out on loan ===
Note: Flags indicate national team as defined under FIFA eligibility rules; some limited exceptions apply. Players may hold more than one non-FIFA nationality.

No.	Pos.	Nation	Player
13	DF	MDA	Serghei Diulgher (at Tiraspol)
19	FW	SLO	Dalibor Volaš (at Maribor)

No.	Pos.	Nation	Player
—	DF	GUI	Djibril Paye (at Tiraspol)

== Transfers ==
=== In ===
Date	Position	Nationality	Name	From	Fee	Ref.
Summer 2011	GK	(Moldova)	Alexandru Zveaghințev	Tiraspol	Undisclosed	
Summer 2011	DF	(Ivory Coast)	Marcel Metoua	Banat Zrenjanin	Undisclosed	
Summer 2011	MF	(Argentina)	Rafael Sosa	Skënderbeu Korçë	Undisclosed	
Summer 2011	MF	(Moldova)	Alexandru Dedov	Dacia Chișinău	Undisclosed	
Summer 2011	FW	(Brazil)	Jhonatan	Atlético Paranaense	Undisclosed	
Summer 2011	FW	(Brazil)	Luvannor	Morrinhos	Undisclosed	
Summer 2011	FW	(Ghana)	Fuseini Nuhu	New Edubiase United	Undisclosed	
Winter 2012	DF	(Portugal)	João Pereira	Beira-Mar	Undisclosed	
Winter 2012	MF	(Portugal)	José Coelho	Benfica	Undisclosed	

=== Out ===
Date	Position	Nationality	Name	To	Fee	Ref.
Summer 2011	DF	(North Macedonia)	Jasmin Mecinović	Tiraspol	Undisclosed	
Summer 2011	DF	(Serbia)	Vladimir Branković	Vojvodina	Undisclosed	
Summer 2011	FW	(Senegal)	Amath Diedhiou	JA Drancy	Undisclosed	
Winter 2012	DF	(Ghana)	Ghandi Kassenu	Degerfors	Undisclosed	
Winter 2012	FW	(Brazil)	Jymmy	Shimizu S-Pulse	Undisclosed	

=== Loans in ===
Date from	Position	Nationality	Name	From	Date to	Ref.
Summer 2011	FW	(Colombia)	David Cortés	Jelgava	Winter 2012	
Winter 2012	DF	(Bolivia)	Leonel Morales	Universitario de Sucre	Winter 2013	
Winter 2012	FW	(Bolivia)	Darwin Ríos	Guabirá	Winter 2013	

=== Loans out ===
Date from	Position	Nationality	Name	To	Date to	Ref.
Summer 2009	DF	(Guinea)	Djibril Paye	Tiraspol	End of Season	
Summer 2011	DF	(Moldova)	Serghei Diulgher	Tiraspol	End of Season	
Summer 2011	FW	(Brazil)	Jymmy	Chornomorets Odesa	Winter 2012	
Summer 2011	FW	(Ghana)	Fuseini Nuhu	Tiraspol	Winter 2012	
Summer 2011	FW	(Slovenia)	Dalibor Volaš	Maribor	End of Season	

=== Released ===
Date	Position	Nationality	Name	Joined	Date
1 January 2012	FW	(Argentina)	Rafael Sosa	Flamurtari Vlorë	1 July 2012
1 January 2012	FW	(Ghana)	Fuseini Nuhu	New Edubiase United	1 July 2012
29 May 2012	DF	(Georgia (country))	Vazha Tarkhnishvili	Retired	29 May 2012

== Competitions ==
=== Divizia Națională ===
==== Results summary ====
Overall								Home						Away					
Pld	W	D	L	GF	GA	GD	Pts	W	D	L	GF	GA	GD	W	D	L	GF	GA	GD
0	0	0	0	0	0	0	0	0	0	0	0	0	0	0	0	0	0	0	0

Last updated: 22 May 2012.
Source: See Results

==== Results ====
24 July 2011 1	Sheriff Tiraspol	2–0	CSCA Chişinău	Tiraspol
19:00 EEST (UTC+3)	Jhonatan 30'; Kassenu (yellow card) 44'; Balima 83'	Report	T.Starciuc (yellow card) 36'; Jardan (yellow card) 61'; Clonin (yellow card) 79'; M.Ciortan (yellow card) 90+1'	Stadium: Malaya Sportivnaya Arena; Attendance: 1,100; Referee: Ghenadie Crasnoşan

31 July 2011 2	Tiraspol	2–3	Sheriff Tiraspol	Tiraspol
19:00 EEST (UTC+3)	Vornișel 41'; R.Tsynya (yellow card) 66'; Fred (yellow card) 73'; G.Nicologlo 85'	Report	Luvannor 33'; Kassenu (yellow card) 50'; Balima 56'; Tarkhnishvili 67' (pen.); Samardžić (yellow card) 87'	Stadium: Malaya Sportivnaya Arena; Attendance: 1,000; Referee: Iurie Covtun

6 August 2011 3	Sheriff Tiraspol	2–1	Zimbru Chișinău	Tiraspol
19:00 EEST (UTC+3)	Balima 1'; Rouamba (yellow card) 57'; Cheptine 82' (yellow card) 84'; Zamaliyev (yellow card) 90+1'; Tarkhnishvili (yellow card) 90+2'	Report	Molla (yellow card) 55' (goal) 90+2' (pen.)	Stadium: Sheriff Stadium; Attendance: 2,200; Referee: Gabriel Tupicico

14 August 2011 4	Sfântul Gheorghe	2–2	Sheriff Tiraspol	Suruceni
17:00 EEST (UTC+3)	Sackey 5'; Posmac (yellow card) 36'; Ursu 90+1'	Report	Samardžić (yellow card) 12' (yellow-red card) 59'; Zamaliyev (yellow card) 51'; Tarkhnishvili (yellow card) 52'; Pešić 87'; Balima 90+4'	Stadium: Suruceni Stadium; Attendance: 700; Referee: Gheorghe Malinovschii

21 August 2011 5	Sheriff Tiraspol	5–1	Iskra-Stal	Tiraspol
19:00 EEST (UTC+3)	Balima 2'; Luvannor 3', 35' (yellow card) 25'; Gheorghiev 41'; Cheptine 79'	Report	Gorodețchi 90+2'	Stadium: Malaya Sportivnaya Arena; Attendance: 1,500; Referee: Vladislav Ivancenco

27 August 2011 6	Olimpia Bălți	1–2	Sheriff Tiraspol	Bălți
17:00 EEST (UTC+3)	Ovseanicov 25'; Camara (yellow card) 57'; Ogada (yellow card) 63' (yellow-red card) 90+2'	Report	Luvannor (yellow card) 20'; Tarkhnishvili (yellow card) 25'; Gheorghiev 27'; Tommy (yellow card) 37'; Balima 72' (yellow card) 90+3'; Cheptine (yellow card) 87'}	Stadium: Stadionul Orășenesc; Attendance: 2,500; Referee: Alexandr Tean

10 September 2011 7	Sheriff Tiraspol	4–0	Costuleni	Tiraspol
18:00 EEST (UTC+3)	Tommy 22'; Balima 32', 36', 76'; Sosa (yellow card) 57'; Zamaliyev (yellow card) 62'; Gheorghiev (yellow card) 71'	Report	Dolgov (yellow card) 11'; Sîrbu (yellow card) 16'; I.Morari (yellow card) 63'	Stadium: Sheriff Stadium; Attendance: 1,000; Referee: Ghenadie Sidenco

17 September 2011 8	Sheriff Tiraspol	0–0	Dacia Chișinău	Tiraspol
18:00 EEST (UTC+3)	Balima (yellow card) 42'; Rouamba (yellow card) 68'; Zamaliyev (yellow card) 90+1'	Report	Popovici (yellow card) 51'	Stadium: Sheriff Stadium; Attendance: 3,000; Referee: Victor Gheciu

21 September 2011 9	Milsami Orhei	0–2	Sheriff Tiraspol	Orhei
16:00 EEST (UTC+3)		Report	Balima 50'; Luvannor 55' (yellow card) 61'	Stadium: CSR Orhei; Attendance: 800; Referee: Vladislav Ivancenco

25 September 2011 10	Sheriff Tiraspol	1–1	Academia Chișinău	Tiraspol
18:00 EEST (UTC+3)	Balima 4'; Tommy (yellow card) 90'	Report	Ciupercă 52' (yellow card) 52' (yellow-red card) 74'; Gînsari (yellow card) 62'; Ojog (yellow card) 81'	Stadium: Sheriff Stadium; Attendance: 1,000; Referee: Vladislav Ivancenco

1 October 2011 11	Nistru Otaci	0–3	Sheriff Tiraspol	Călărășeuca
15:00 EEST (UTC+3)	G.Tukhashvili (yellow card) 75'	Report	Luvannor 32'; Balima 72'; Cheptine 90'	Stadium: Călărășeuca Stadium; Attendance: 300; Referee: Gabriel Tupicico

15 October 2011 12	CSCA Chişinău	1–2	Sheriff Tiraspol	Ghidighici
15:00 EEST (UTC+3)	Jardan 23'; T.Starciuc (yellow card) 74'; Manaliu (yellow card) 80'	Report	Luvannor 30'; Samardžić (yellow card) 76'; Cheptine 78'	Stadium: Ghidighici Stadium; Attendance: 250; Referee: Serghei Derenov

22 October 2011 13	Sheriff Tiraspol	3–1	Tiraspol	Tiraspol
17:00 EEST (UTC+3)	Balima 5'; Sosa 35'; Rouamba (yellow card) 45'; Samardžić (yellow card) 61' (goal) 82'	Report	A.Radiola (yellow card) 57'; Grosu 90'	Stadium: Sheriff Stadium; Attendance: 500; Referee: Alexandr Tean

30 October 2011 14	Zimbru Chișinău	0–1	Sheriff Tiraspol	Chișinău
14:00 EET (UTC+2)	Cheltuială (yellow card) 34'; S.Cuznețov (yellow card) 44'; Șișchin (yellow card) 48'	Report	Zamaliyev 13'; Jhonatan (yellow card) 33'; Luvannor (yellow card) 44'; Zveaghințev (yellow card) 90'	Stadium: Zimbru Stadium; Attendance: 2,000; Referee: Igor Şaţchii

5 November 2011 15	Sheriff Tiraspol	5–0	Sfântul Gheorghe	Tiraspol
17:00 EET (UTC+2)	Pešić 29'; Tarkhnishvili 33' (pen.); Zamaliyev 35'; Metoua 53'; Sosa 84'	Report	V.Lungu (yellow card) 32'; Tcaciuc (yellow card) 87'	Stadium: Malaya Sportivnaya Arena; Attendance: 500; Referee: Serghei Derenov

19 November 2011 16	Iskra-Stal	1–2	Sheriff Tiraspol	Rîbnița
13:00 EET (UTC+2)	Chebotaryov 9'; T.Kourouma (yellow card) 58'	Report	Pešić 53'; Tarkhnishvili 89' (pen.)	Stadium: Gorodskoj Stadion; Attendance: 1,500; Referee: Vladislav Ivancenco

29 November 2011 17	Sheriff Tiraspol	0–0	Olimpia Bălți	Tiraspol
17:00 EET (UTC+2)	Zamaliyev (yellow card) 27' (yellow-red card) 43'; Luvannor (yellow card) 79'	Report	O.Remezovskyi (yellow card) 4'; Camara (yellow card) 25' (yellow-red card) 51'; Orlovschi (yellow card) 57'; Ovseanicov (yellow card) 80'	Stadium: Sheriff Stadium; Attendance: 400; Referee: Gabriel Tupicico

3 March 2012 18	Costuleni	0–2	Sheriff Tiraspol	Chișinău
13:00 EET (UTC+2)	Kolev (yellow card) 33'	Report	Pešić 43', 59' (yellow card) 44'; Gheorghiev (yellow card) 51'; Metoua (yellow card) 76'; Dedov (yellow card) 90+3'	Stadium: Joma Arena; Attendance: 300; Referee: Vadim Dedeniov

10 March 2012 19	Dacia Chișinău	0–0	Sheriff Tiraspol	Chișinău
14:00 EET (UTC+2)	Ilescu (yellow card) 31'; Mihaliov (yellow card) 36'	Report	Onica (yellow card) 36'; Rouamba (yellow card) 65'	Stadium: Stadionul CPTF; Attendance: 2,000; Referee: Günter Perl

17 March 2012 20	Sheriff Tiraspol	2–1	Milsami Orhei	Tiraspol
17:00 EET (UTC+2)	Luvannor 20'; Balima 28' (pen.)	Report	N.Mohammed (yellow card) 9'; O.Traoré 90+2'	Stadium: Krytyj futbolnyj Manesh; Attendance: 1,500; Referee: Igor Şaţchii

21 March 2012 21	Academia Chișinău	1–2	Sheriff Tiraspol	Vadul lui Vodă
15:30 EET (UTC+2)	Potîrniche (yellow card) 5'; Livandovschi (yellow card) 31' (goal) 50'; Plătică (yellow card) 65'	Report	Balima 5' (pen.); Coelho (yellow card) 41'; Luvannor 43'	Stadium: Stadionul CPSM; Attendance: 500; Referee: Serghei Derenov

25 March 2012 22	Sheriff Tiraspol	4–0	Nistru Otaci	Tiraspol
17:00 EEST (UTC+3)	Ríos 8', 31'; Kucherenko 52' (o.g.); Balima 59'; Onica (yellow card) 86'	Report	A.Tcaciuc (yellow card) 67'	Stadium: Krytyj futbolnyj Manesh; Attendance: 1,000; Referee: Vadim Dedeniov

30 March 2012 23	Sheriff Tiraspol	4–1	Costuleni	Tiraspol
17:00 EEST (UTC+3)	Balima 31'; Luvannor 39'; Pešić 70'; Jhonatan 87'	Report	V.Sofroni (yellow card) 29'; Cabac (yellow card) 58'; J.N'Gako (yellow card) 60'; Onofrei 83'	Stadium: Krytyj futbolnyj Manesh; Attendance: 500; Referee: Victor Gheciu

2 April 2012 24	Sheriff Tiraspol	0–0	Dacia Chișinău	Tiraspol
18:00 EEST (UTC+3)	Rouamba (yellow card) 62'; Samardžić (yellow card) 68'	Report	Guira (yellow card) 57'; Cojocari (yellow card) 65'	Stadium: Krytyj futbolnyj Manesh; Attendance: 3,000; Referee: Igor Şaţchii

6 April 2012 25	Zimbru Chișinău	1–0	Sheriff Tiraspol	Chișinău
12:00 EEST (UTC+3)	Barakhoyev (yellow card) 67'; Catan 75'; Erhan (yellow card) 90+4'	Report	Pešić (yellow card) 62'	Stadium: Stadionul CPTF; Attendance: 500; Referee: Ghenadie Sidenco

14 April 2012 26	Sheriff Tiraspol	2–1	Iskra-Stal	Tiraspol
18:00 EEST (UTC+3)	Pešić 26', 49' (yellow card) 34'; Tommy (yellow card) 44'	Report	Shugladze 24'; M.Gavrylenko (yellow card) 27'; P.Hvorosteanov (yellow card) 37'	Stadium: Krytyj futbolnyj Manesh; Attendance: 1,000; Referee: Serghei Derenov

21 April 2012 27	Milsami Orhei	0–1	Sheriff Tiraspol	Orhei
16:00 EEST (UTC+3)	Sosnovschi (yellow card) 28'; Gârlă (yellow card) 45'; Espinoza (yellow card) 50'	Report	Gheorghiev (yellow card) 52'; Rață (yellow card) 60'; Cheptine 85'; Stoyanov (yellow card) 90+3'	Stadium: CSR Orhei; Attendance: 1,000; Referee: Ghenadie Sidenco

27 April 2012 28	Sheriff Tiraspol	6–0	Olimpia Bălți	Tiraspol
18:00 EEST (UTC+3)	Pešić 7' (pen.), 26', 44'; Zamaliyev 71'; Balima 73'; Tarkhnishvili (yellow card) 74'; S.Gusacov 81' (o.g.)	Report		Stadium: Malaya Sportivnaya Arena; Attendance: 1,000; Referee: Gabriel Tupicico

1 May 2012 29	Tiraspol	0–3	Sheriff Tiraspol	Tiraspol
18:00 EEST (UTC+3)	Țurcan (yellow card) 90'	Report	Gheorghiev 37'; Dedov 40'; Pešić (penalty missed) 48' (yellow card) 76'; Samardžić 75'; Cheptine (yellow card) 77'	Stadium: Malaya Sportivnaya Arena; Attendance: 850; Referee: Ruslan Muntean

6 May 2012 30	Sheriff Tiraspol	3–0	Nistru Otaci	Tiraspol
18:00 EEST (UTC+3)	Metoua 15'; Ríos 39'; Cheptine 88'	Report		Stadium: Malaya Sportivnaya Arena; Attendance: 2,000; Referee: Serghei Derenov

10 May 2012 31	CSCA Chişinău	0–2	Sheriff Tiraspol	Ghidighici
17:00 EEST (UTC+3)		Report	Pešić 14', 30'; Morales (yellow card) 85'	Stadium: Ghidighici Stadium; Attendance: 200; Referee: Ghenadie Sidenco

18 May 2012 32	Sheriff Tiraspol	5–0	Sfântul Gheorghe	Tiraspol
17:00 EEST (UTC+3)	Balima (penalty missed) 22; Metoua 50' (pen.); Cheptine 51'; Pešić 57'; Samardžić 62'; Rață 71'	Report	V.Lungu (yellow card) 29'; Costin (yellow card) 84'	Stadium: Malaya Sportivnaya Arena; Attendance: 2,000; Referee: Ghenadie Sidenco

23 May 2012 33	Academia Chișinău	2–0	Sheriff Tiraspol	Vadul lui Vodă
17:00 EEST (UTC+3)	A.Bludnov (yellow card) 23'; S.Istrati 25'; Plătică 40'; Livandovschi (yellow card) 53'	Report	Morales (yellow card) 15'	Stadium: Stadionul CPSM; Attendance: 200; Referee: Igor Şaţchii

==== League table ====
Pos	Team	Pld	W	D	L	GF	GA	GD	Pts	Qualification or relegation
1	Sheriff Tiraspol (C)	33	25	6	2	75	18	+57	81	Qualification for the Champions League second qualifying round
2	Dacia Chișinău	33	24	5	4	63	17	+46	77	Qualification for the Europa League first qualifying round
3	Zimbru Chișinău	33	17	10	6	47	24	+23	61	Qualification for the Europa League first qualifying round
4	Milsami Orhei	33	14	5	14	41	37	+4	47	Qualification for the Europa League second qualifying round (Note: Milsami Orhei won the 2011–12 Moldovan Cup and therefore qualified for the second qualifying round of UEFA Europa League.)
5	Olimpia Bălți	33	10	15	8	26	27	−1	45	

Source: Moldovan Football Federation
Rules for classification: 1st points; 2nd head-to-head points; 3rd head-to-head goal difference; 4th head-to-head goals scored; 5th goal difference; 6th number of goals scored; 7th Fair Play competition
(C) Champions

=== Moldovan Cup ===
23 November 2011 Third Round	Locomotiva Bălți	0–10	Sheriff Tiraspol	Tiraspol
17:00 EET (UTC+2)		Report	Jhonatan 5', 52'; Samardžić 17'; Luvannor 22', 23', 85'; Cheptanari 30' (o.g.); Tommy 41'; Cortes 61', 84'	Stadium: Malaya Sportivnaya Arena

10 April 2012 Quarterfinal	Zimbru Chișinău	0–1	Sheriff Tiraspol	Chișinău
16:00 EEST (UTC+3)		Report	Samardžić 52'	Stadium: Zimbru Stadium

14 May 2012 Semifinal	CSCA–Rapid	1–1 (a.e.t.) (4–2 p)	Sheriff Tiraspol	Ghidighici
16:00 EEST (UTC+3)	Pașcenco 88'	Report	Samardžić 48' (red card) 52'	Stadium: Ghidighici Stadium
	Penalties
	A.Maxim (penalty scored); Tofan (penalty scored); Luca (penalty scored); Bugneac (penalty scored)		Metoua (penalty scored); Khachaturov (penalty scored)

=== UEFA Europa League ===
==== Qualifying rounds ====
14 July 2011 Second Qualifying Round 1st leg	Željezničar (Bosnia and Herzegovina)	1–0	(Moldova) Sheriff Tiraspol	Sarajevo,^{1} Bosnia and Herzegovina
21:30 EEST (UTC+3)	Bešlija 60'	Report	Metoua (yellow card) 19'; Luvannor (yellow card) 74'; Bulat (yellow card) 90+1'; Sosa (yellow card) 90+2'	Stadium: Asim Ferhatović Hase Stadium; Attendance: 10,000; Referee: Anastasios Sidiropoulos (Greece)

21 July 2011 Second qualifying round 2nd leg	Sheriff Tiraspol (Moldova)	0–0 (0–1 agg.)	(Bosnia and Herzegovina) Željezničar	Tiraspol,^{2} Moldova
19:00 EEST (UTC+3)	Luvannor (yellow card) 26'; Bulat (yellow card) 39'; Dima (yellow card) 89'	Report	S.Savić (yellow card) 8'; Vasilić (yellow card) 56'	Stadium: Malaya Sportivnaya Arena (Small Arena); Attendance: 5,120; Referee: Kenn Hansen (Denmark)

== Squad statistics ==
As of Match played 23 May 2012

=== Appearances and goals ===
No.	Pos	Nat	Player	Total		Divizia Națională		Moldovan Cup		Europa League	
No.	Pos	Nat	Player	Apps	Goals	Apps	Goals	Apps	Goals	Apps	Goals
1	GK	(Moldova) MDA	Alexandru Zveaghințev	16	0	15	0	0+1	0	0	0
3	DF	(Portugal) POR	João Pereira	9	0	7+2	0	0	0	0	0
4	DF	(Moldova) MDA	Vadim Costandachi	4	0	1+2	0	1	0	0	0
5	DF	(Georgia (country)) GEO	Vazha Tarkhnishvili	36	0	31+1	0	3	0	0+1	0
7	MF	(Moldova) MDA	Vitalie Bulat	12	0	5+4	0	0+1	0	2	0
8	MF	(Moldova) MDA	Serghei Gheorghiev	23	3	11+10	3	1+1	0	0	0
9	FW	(Bolivia) BOL	Darwin Ríos	13	3	8+5	3	0	0	0	0
10	FW	(Serbia) SRB	Aleksandar Pešić	25	14	13+10	14	2	0	0	0
12	GK	(Moldova) MDA	Dmitri Stajila	1	0	1	0	0	0	0	0
14	MF	(Burkina Faso) BFA	Wilfried Balima	31	18	26+1	18	2	0	2	0
15	DF	(Ivory Coast) CIV	Marcel Metoua	36	3	32	3	2	0	2	0
16	DF	(Bolivia) BOL	Leonel Morales	12	0	10	0	2	0	0	0
17	MF	(Burkina Faso) BFA	Florent Rouamba	29	0	24+2	0	1+1	0	1	0
18	DF	(Moldova) MDA	Artyom Khachaturov	16	0	5+9	0	0+2	0	0	0
20	MF	(Portugal) POR	José Coelho	13	0	12+1	0	0	0	0	0
22	MF	(Sierra Leone) SLE	Abu Tommy	19	2	12+4	1	3	1	0	0
23	FW	(Brazil) BRA	Jhonatan	20	4	13+4	2	1	2	2	0
25	GK	(Bulgaria) BUL	Vladislav Stoyanov	22	0	17	0	3	0	2	0
26	DF	(Slovenia) SLO	Miral Samardžić	30	6	20+5	3	3	3	2	0
28	MF	(Moldova) MDA	Vadim Rață	26	1	19+6	1	0	0	1	0
33	MF	(Russia) RUS	Nail Zamaliyev	28	3	14+9	3	2+1	0	2	0
77	MF	(Moldova) MDA	Anatol Cheptine	21	7	3+15	7	1+1	0	0+1	0
90	FW	(Brazil) BRA	Luvannor	30	12	24+2	9	2	3	2	0
	MF	(Moldova) MDA	Alexandru Dedov	15	1	5+8	1	1+1	0	0	0
	MF	(Moldova) MDA	Veaceslav Lisa	5	0	1+4	0	0	0	0	0
	MF	(Moldova) MDA	Alexandru Onica	15	0	12+1	0	2	0	0	0
	MF	(Moldova) MDA	Igor Poiarcov	3	0	3	0	0	0	0	0
	FW	(Moldova) MDA	Igor Dima	3	0	0+2	0	0	0	0+1	0
Players away on loan :
Players who left Sheriff Tiraspol during the season:
9	FW	(Brazil) BRA	Jymmy	1	0	0	0	0	0	1	0
19	FW	(Colombia) COL	David Cortes	3	2	0+2	0	0+1	2	0	0
20	DF	(Ghana) GHA	Ghandi Kassenu	20	0	17	0	1	0	2	0
27	MF	(Argentina) ARG	Rafael Sosa	13	2	9+1	2	0+1	0	1+1	0

=== Goal scorers ===
Place	Position	Nation	Number	Name	Divizia Națională	Moldovan Cup	Europa League	Total
1	MF	(Burkina Faso)	14	Wilfried Balima	18	0	0	18
2	FW	(Serbia)	10	Aleksandar Pešić	14	0	0	14
3	FW	(Brazil)	90	Luvannor	9	3	0	12
4	MF	(Moldova)	77	Anatol Cheptine	7	0	0	7
5	DF	(Slovenia)	26	Miral Samardžić	3	3	0	6
6	FW	(Brazil)	23	Jhonatan	2	2	0	4
7	DF	(Georgia (country))	5	Vazha Tarkhnishvili	3	0	0	3
7	MF	(Moldova)	8	Serghei Gheorghiev	3	0	0	3
7	MF	(Russia)	33	Nail Zamaliyev	3	0	0	3
7	DF	(Ivory Coast)	15	Marcel Metoua	3	0	0	3
7	FW	(Bolivia)	9	Darwin Ríos	3	0	0	3
7				Own goal	2	1	0	3
13	FW	(Argentina)	27	Rafael Sosa	2	0	0	2
13	FW	(Sierra Leone)	22	Abu Tommy	1	1	0	2
13	FW	(Colombia)	19	David Cortes	0	2	0	2
16	MF	(Moldova)		Alexandru Dedov	1	0	0	1
16	MF	(Moldova)	28	Vadim Rață	1	0	0	1
				TOTALS	75	12	0	87

=== Disciplinary record ===
Number	Nation	Position	Name	Divizia Națională		Moldovan Cup		Europa League		Total	
Number	Nation	Position	Name	Yellow card	Red card	Yellow card	Red card	Yellow card	Red card	Yellow card	Red card
1	(Moldova)	GK	Alexandru Zveaghințev	1	0	0	0	0	0	1	0
5	(Georgia (country))	DF	Vazha Tarkhnishvili	4	0	0	0	0	0	4	0
7	(Moldova)	MF	Vitalie Bulat	0	0	0	0	2	0	2	0
8	(Moldova)	MF	Serghei Gheorghiev	3	0	0	0	0	0	3	0
10	(Serbia)	FW	Aleksandar Pešić	4	0	2	0	0	0	6	0
14	(Burkina Faso)	MF	Wilfried Balima	2	0	0	0	0	0	2	0
15	(Ivory Coast)	DF	Marcel Metoua	1	0	0	0	1	0	2	0
16	(Bolivia)	DF	Leonel Morales	2	0	0	0	0	0	2	0
17	(Burkina Faso)	MF	Florent Rouamba	5	0	0	0	0	0	5	0
20	(Portugal)	MF	José Coelho	1	0	0	0	0	0	1	0
22	(Sierra Leone)	MF	Abu Tommy	3	0	0	0	0	0	3	0
23	(Brazil)	FW	Jhonatan	1	0	0	0	0	0	1	0
25	(Bulgaria)	GK	Vladislav Stoyanov	1	0	0	0	0	0	1	0
26	(Slovenia)	DF	Miral Samardžić	6	1	0	1	0	0	6	2
28	(Moldova)	MF	Vadim Rață	1	0	0	0	0	0	1	0
33	(Russia)	MF	Nail Zamaliyev	6	1	0	0	0	0	6	1
77	(Moldova)	MF	Anatol Cheptine	3	0	0	0	0	0	3	0
90	(Brazil)	FW	Luvannor	5	0	0	0	2	0	7	0
	(Moldova)	MF	Alexandru Dedov	1	0	0	0	0	0	1	0
	(Moldova)	MF	Alexandru Onica	2	0	0	0	0	0	2	0
	(Moldova)	FW	Igor Dima	0	0	0	0	1	0	1	0
Players away from Sheriff Tiraspol on loan:
Players who left Sheriff Tiraspol during the season:
20	(Ghana)	DF	Ghandi Kassenu	2	0	0	0	0	0	2	0
27	(Argentina)	MF	Rafael Sosa	1	0	0	0	1	0	2	0
			TOTALS	52	2	2	1	7	0	61	3

== Notes ==
- Note 1: Željezničar played their home match at Asim Ferhatović Hase Stadium, Sarajevo as it has a greater capacity than their own Stadion Grbavica.
- Note 2: Sheriff Tiraspol played their home match at Malaya Sportivnaya Arena (Small Arena), Tiraspol as it is located in the same complex as Sheriff Stadium, the club's main stadium.
