= Berezovca =

Berezovca may refer to:

- Berezovca, a village in Calarașovca commune, Moldova
- Berezivka, a town in Ukraine known in Romanian as Berezovca
  - Berezovca County and Berezovca District, administrative divisions of Romania's World War II Transnistria Governorate
