= Alhassan Nuhu =

Ghanaian footballer

Personal information
- Date of birth: 20 June 1993 (age 33)
- Place of birth: Accra, Ghana
- Height: 5 ft 9 in (1.75 m)
- Position: Midfielder

Youth career
- AC Milan Colts Club

Senior career*
Years	Team	Apps	(Gls)
2006–2009	Real Sportive		
2009–2011	New Edubiase United		
2011–?	FC Sheriff Tiraspol		
2015–2016	Ashanti Gold	20	(1)
2017	New Edubiase United		
- * Club domestic league appearances and goals as of 12 September 2016

Alhassan Nuhu (born 4 June 1993) is a Ghanaian footballer who last played for New Edubiase United.

== Career ==
Nuhu began his career by AC Milan Colts Club in Tema, before in 2006 was transferred to Real Sportive, after the relegation of his club from the Ghana Premier League left Alhassan his club alongside his twin brother Fuseini and signed for New Edubiase United. In June 2011 he and Fuseini were transferred to Moldavian vice-champion FC Sheriff Tiraspol.

Nuhu joined Ashanti Gold in 2015, scoring on his debut, against Medeama. He was released after a single season, having made 20 appearances for the club. He then returned to New Edubiase United for a brief spell.

== Personal life ==
Nuhu played with his brother Fuseini by the team from Tema.
