= Mamuka Lomidze =

Georgian footballer

Personal information
- Date of birth: 16 June 1984 (age 42)
- Place of birth: Tbilisi, Georgian SSR
- Height: 1.84 m (6 ft 0 in)
- Position: Centre back

Senior career*
Years	Team	Apps	(Gls)
2001–2003	Dinamo Batumi		
2003–2005	FC Rostov		
2005	Sibir Novosibirsk	13	(0)
2005–2006	Dinamo Batumi	13	(0)
2006–2009	Zimbru Chisinau	57	(3)
2009	Lokomotivi Tbilisi	10	(0)
2009	Metalurgi Rustavi		
2010	MFK Ružomberok	4	(0)
2010–2011	Dacia Chişinău	20	(0)
2011–2012	Dinamo Tbilisi	3	(0)

International career
2000	Georgia U-17	1	(0)
2001–2002	Georgia U-19	4	(0)
2002–2003	Georgia U-21	4	(0)
- * Club domestic league appearances and goals

Mamuka Lomidze (Georgian: მამუკა ლომიძე; born 16 June 1984) is a Georgian football player. He is a defender and last played for Dinamo Tbilisi in Georgia.
