= David Cortés (Colombian footballer) =

Colombian footballer (born 1992)

David Cortés Armero
Personal information
- Full name: David Cortés Armero
- Date of birth: 1 May 1992 (age 34)
- Place of birth: Bogotá, Colombia
- Height: 1.77 m (5 ft 10 in)
- Position: Forward

Team information
- Current team: Jaguares
- Number: 16

Youth career
- 2010: Atlético Huila

Senior career*
Years	Team	Apps	(Gls)
2011	Jelgava	6	(1)
2011	Sheriff	2	(0)
2012	Spartaks Jūrmala	25	(12)
2012–2013	Salyut Belgorod	0	(0)
2013	Deportivo Quevedo	11	(1)
2014	Unión Magdalena	4	(0)
2014	Deportivo Pereira	16	(7)
2015	Correcaminos UAT	6	(0)
2015	América de Cali	7	(1)
2016–2018	Cortuluá	10	(2)
2018	Cantolao	12	(2)
2019–	Jaguares	1	(0)
- * Club domestic league appearances and goals as of 13 February 2019

David Cortés Armero (born 1 May 1992) is a Colombian professional footballer who plays as a forward for Jaguares.
