= Baćo Nikolić =

Montenegrin footballer (born 1986)

Personal information
- Full name: Baćo Nikolić
- Date of birth: 19 January 1986 (age 40)
- Place of birth: Nikšić, SFR Yugoslavia
- Height: 1.86 m (6 ft 1 in)
- Position: Right wing

Senior career*
Years	Team	Apps	(Gls)
2004–2005	Sutjeska Nikšić	4	(0)
2005–2006	Petrovac	26	(2)
2006–2009	Lovćen	44	(4)
2010	Sheriff Tiraspol	20	(1)
2011	Grbalj	15	(1)
2011–2012	Sutjeska Nikšić	44	(3)
2013–2014	Borac Čačak	44	(6)
2015	Flamurtari	7	(0)
2015–2016	Mladost Velika Obarska		
2016	Mornar	16	(1)
2016–2017	Iskra Danilovgrad	12	(0)
2017	Lovćen	13	(1)
2017	Dečić	0	(0)
2017	Mornar	14	(0)
2018	Otrant	15	(1)
2018	Sloga Gornje Crnjelovo	16	(2)
2019	Drina Ljubovija		
2019–2021	Timočanin		
2023-	Lovćen	32	(0)
- * Club domestic league appearances and goals as of 19 May 2024 ‡ National team caps and goals as of 1 July 2019

Baćo Nikolić (Serbian Cyrillic: Баћо Николић; born 19 January 1986) is a Montenegrin football midfielder.

== Club career ==
Following a run of poor performances, Tomić was released by Flamurtari alongside Vukašin Tomić and Yani Urdinov on 16 April 2015.

In February 2018, Nikolić joined FK Otrant. He then joined Bosnian club OFK Sloga Gornje Crnjelovo, which he left again on 17 January 2019, the club announced.

By early 2019 he returned to Serbia and joined FK Drina Ljubovija, and six months later moved to an also third-level side, FK Timočanin.
