= Mihai Cojusea =

Moldovan footballer

Personal information
- Full name: Mihai Cojusea
- Date of birth: 12 August 1978 (age 48)
- Place of birth: Comrat, Moldavian SSR
- Height: 1.80 m (5 ft 11 in)
- Position: Striker

Team information
- Current team: CF Gagauziya
- Number: 9

Youth career
- CF Gagauziya

Senior career*
| Years | Team | Apps | (Gls) |
| 1998– | CF Gagauziya | 156 | (31) |
- * Club domestic league appearances and goals as of 15 April 2013

Mihai Cojusea (born 12 August 1978, Comrat, Moldavian SSR) is a Moldavian football striker who plays for CF Gagauziya.

== Club statistics ==
- Total matches played in Moldavian First League: 37 matches – 19 goals
