= Iurie Mîrza =

Moldovan footballer

Personal information
- Full name: Iurie Mîrza
- Date of birth: 5 March 1993 (age 33)
- Place of birth: Moldova
- Height: 1.76 m (5 ft 9 1/2 in)
- Position: Winger

Team information
- Current team: Gagauziya-Oguzsport
- Number: 11

Senior career*
Years	Team	Apps	(Gls)
2010	Sheriff Tiraspol	1	(1)
2010	Gagauziya-Oguzsport	13	(0)
2010–2013	→ FC Sheriff-2 Tiraspol (loan)	75	(49)
2012–2013	Sheriff Tiraspol	3	(1)
2013–2014	FC Tiraspol	6	(0)
2014–2015	→ FC Saxan (loan)	12	(0)
2015–	Gagauziya-Oguzsport (loan)	?	(?)

International career
	Moldova-19	9	(1)
2012–	Moldova-21	6	(0)
- * Club domestic league appearances and goals

Iurie Mîrza is a Moldovan football player who currently is playing for Gagauziya-Oguzsport.
