= Razak Salifu =

Ghanaian footballer (born 1988)

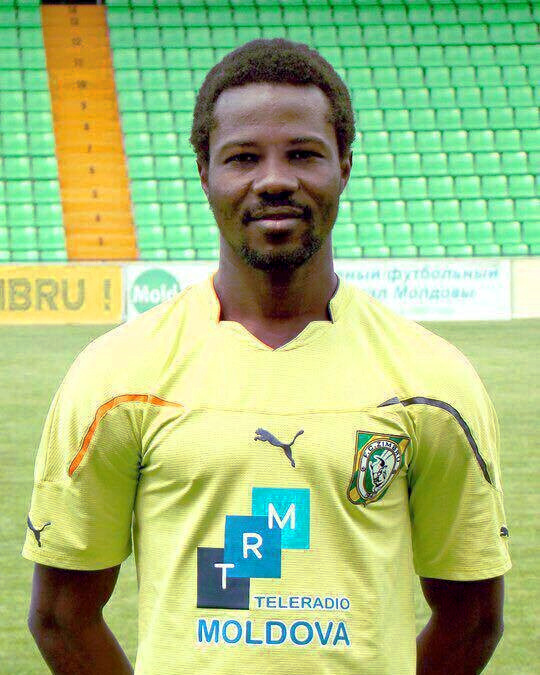

Personal information
- Full name: Abdul Razak Salifu
- Date of birth: October 1, 1988 (age 38)
- Place of birth: Ho, Ghana
- Height: 1.70 m (5 ft 7 in)
- Positions: Midfielder; striker

Youth career
- FC Maamobi
- All Blacks
- AGF

Senior career*
| Years | Team | Apps | (Gls) |
| 2013–2014 | AGF | 17 | (4) |
| 2014–2015 | → Kolding FC (loan) | 11 | (4) |
| 2015–2016 | FC Zimbru Chişinău | 23 | (9) |
| 2017–2018 | Mighty Jets | | |
- * Club domestic league appearances and goals

Abdul Razak Salifu (born 1 October 1988) is a former Ghanaian professional football midfielder or striker.

== Career ==
Abdul began his career in Ghana by FC Maamobi, before moving to All Blacks. He later moved to AGF. He left AGF and moved on loan to Kolding FC. Abdul was handed a free transfer by AGF and a 1-year contract with Moldovan National Division side FC Zimbru Chişinău.
