= Fuseini Nuhu =

Ghanaian footballer

Personal information
- Date of birth: 20 June 1989 (age 37)
- Place of birth: Accra, Ghana
- Height: 5 ft 10 in (1.78 m)
- Position: Striker

Team information
- Current team: Ashanti Gold s.c

Youth career
- 2004: Real Sportive

Senior career*
| Years | Team | Apps | (Gls) |
| 2005 | Real Sportive | | |
| 2006–2010 | New Edubiase United | | |
| 2011 | FC Sheriff Tiraspol | | |
| 2012–2015 | New Edubiase United | | |
| 2016–17 | Ashanti Gold S.C. | | |
| 2017–2018 | Mekelle City FC | | |

International career
| 2015 | Ghana | 2 | (0) |
- * Club domestic league appearances and goals

Fuseini Nuhu (born 20 June 1989 in Accra, Greater Accra Region) is a Ghana football player who plays for Mekelle City FC

== Career ==
Nuhu began his career by AC Milan Colts Club in Tema, before which he was transferred to Real Sportive. After the relegation of his club after the 2008/2009 season, he signed with New Edubiase United, where he scored here in his first goal. In June 2011 he was transferred to Moldavian FC Sheriff Tiraspol.

== Personal life ==
Nuhu is the brother of Alhassan Nuhu.
