= Jhonatan (footballer, born 1989) =

Brazilian footballer

Personal information
- Full name: Jhonatan da Silva Pereira
- Date of birth: January 31, 1989 (age 37)
- Place of birth: Corumbá, Brazil
- Height: 1.68 m (5 ft 6 in)
- Position: Striker

Youth career
- 2004–2006: Grêmio

Senior career*
| Years | Team | Apps | (Gls) |
| 2006–2008 | Grêmio | 2 | (0) |
| 2008–2009 | Metropolitano | ? | (?) |
| 2009–2011 | Paranaense | ? | (?) |
| 2011–2013 | FC Sheriff | 14 | (1) |
| 2013 | Tractor Sazi | 8 | (0) |
| 2014 | CA Juventus | ? | (?) |
| 2014 | EC Pelotas | ? | (?) |
| 2015 | Novoperário | ? | (?) |
| 2015 | Tochigi SC | 1 | (0) |

International career
| 2007–2010 | Brazil U-23 | | |
- * Club domestic league appearances and goals

Jhonatan da Silva Pereira or simply Jhonatan (born January 31, 1989, in Corumbá), is a Brazilian football striker who most recently plays for Tochigi SC in Japan.
