= Călărășeuca Stadium =

Sports venue in Moldova

- Interactive map of Călărășeuca Stadium
- Location: Călărășeuca, Moldova
- Coordinates: 48°25′35″N 27°48′42″E
- Capacity: 2000
- Surface: grass

Tenant
- FC Nistru Otaci

Călărășeuca Stadium (Romanian: Stadionul Călărășeuca) is a multi-use stadium in Călărășeuca, Moldova. It is used mostly for football matches and is the home ground of FC Nistru Otaci. The stadium holds 2,000 people.
