= Mihai Cabac =

Moldovan footballer

Mihail Cabac
Personal information
- Full name: Mihail Cabac
- Date of birth: 2 September 1986 (age 40)
- Place of birth: Moldova
- Height: 1.90 m (6 ft 3 in)
- Position: Defender

Team information
- Current team: FC Speranţa Crihana Veche

Senior career*
Years	Team	Apps	(Gls)
2006	Dacia Chişinău	1	(0)
2006–2007	CS Tiligul-Tiras Tiraspol	2	(0)
2007–2008	FC Beșiktaș Chișinău	18	(0)
2009–2010	FC Milsami	17	(2)
2010–2012	FC Costuleni	58	(0)
2012–2013	FC Veris	9	(1)
2013–	FC Speranţa Crihana Veche	13	(0)
- * Club domestic league appearances and goals

Mihai Cabac (born 2 September 1986) is a Moldovan footballer who plays for Moldovan National Division club FC Speranța Crihana Veche as a defender.
