= Ghandi Kassenu =

Ghanaian footballer

Personal information
- Full name: Ghandi Kassenu
- Date of birth: 9 August 1989 (age 37)
- Place of birth: Accra, Ghana
- Height: 6 ft 0 in (1.83 m)
- Position: Defender

Youth career
- Liberty Babies

Senior career*
Years	Team	Apps	(Gls)
2005–2011	Liberty Professionals	64	(12)
2008	→ BK Häcken (loan)	10	(0)
2011–2012	Sheriff Tiraspol	34	(0)
2012	Degerfors IF	9	(0)
2012–2013	Liberty Professionals		
2013–	Al-Merrikh		

International career
2006–2007	Ghana U17	3	(0)
2007–2009	Ghana U20	7	(0)
- * Club domestic league appearances and goals

Ghandi Kassenu (born 9 August 1989) is a Ghanaian footballer who plays as a defender. He currently plays for Al-Merrikh in Sudan Premier League.

== Career ==
Kassenu began his career with Liberty Professionals and was loaned out to Swedish club BK Häcken in 2008. In 2011, Dassenu joined Moldovan club Sheriff Tiraspol for their 2011–12 Divizia Naţională season.

== International career ==
Kassenu was a member of the Ghana U20 team that won the FIFA U-20 World Cup in Egypt 2009. Kassenu came on as a substitute after 65 minutes in the final against Brazil on 16 October 2009.

== Honours ==
=== Ghana ===
- FIFA U-20 World Cup: 2009
