= Rafael Sosa =

Argentine footballer

Personal information
- Full name: Alfredo Rafael Sosa
- Date of birth: 7 May 1988 (age 38)
- Place of birth: Catamarca, Argentina
- Height: 1.71 m (5 ft 7 in)
- Position: Forward

Youth career
- 2000–2007: Estudiantes

Senior career*
Years	Team	Apps	(Gls)
2007–2009	Estudiantes	0	(0)
2009–2010	Dinamo Tirana	25	(8)
2010–2011	Skënderbeu Korçë	29	(13)
2011–2012	Sheriff Tiraspol	10	(2)
2012–2013	Flamurtari Vlorë	14	(1)
2013–2014	Villa Cubas		
2014	Atlético Policial		
2015	Laçi	10	(0)
- * Club domestic league appearances and goals

Alfredo Rafael Sosa (Albanian: Rafael Soza; born 7 May 1988) is an Argentine former professional footballer who played as a forward.

== Sosa ==
Sosa started his career with Argentine club Estudiantes de La Plata as a teenager. He played mainly for the reserve and youth teams during his time in Argentina. After negotiations with Albanian club Dinamo Tirana, Estudiantes decided to offer the Albanians Rafael Sosa and Nicolas Delmonte on loan until the end of the Albanian Superliga 2009–10 season.

=== Dinamo Tirana ===
Sosa completed his move to Dinamo Tirana on 26 June 2009. He arrived late from Argentina and completed all the formalities at the 'Dinamo Complex' before training with the rest of the squad for the first time. He became Dinamo's first Argentine signing of the 2009–10 season.

Sosa made his competitive debut for the club in the Europa League 2009-10 1st leg tie against FC Lahti. He performed well on his debut which in the end did not help the club much as they lost 4–1 to the Finnish side. Rafael Sosa came on as a substitute for Serbian striker Mladen Brkic. Along with the second leg in which Rafael Sosa did not manage feature in, the aggregate score was 4–3 which sent the Albania side crashing out of the Competition.

The Argentine made his league debut on the opening day of the season on 23 August 2009 in an away match against newly promoted KS Kastrioti Kruje. Rafael Sosa started the game in midfield and helped his side to a 3–1 win. The most important goal scored by the Argentinian newcomer to the 'blues'of Tirana was that one, and the only one scored in the away match Besa-Dinamo 0–1. This goal let Dinamo stand to the top of classification. The same player scored against the only goal of the home match this time Dinamo-Tirana, so that Dinamo went 15 points ahead Besa, since the 15th fixture.

During his first press conference in Albania Rafael Sosa explained how he was happy with his move to Albania and that although he found it difficult to settle in at a new club which is his first away from Argentina, he would give his 100% for the club. He also stated that he does not expect to score many goals, he just wants to play good football for Dinamo for as long as he is there.

=== Skënderbeu Korçë ===
On 19 August 2010, Sosa signed for Skënderbeu Korçë. He made 29 appearances and scored 13 goals. He was Skenderbeu's top scorer.

=== Laçi ===
Sosa returned in Albania in January 2015 to join top flight side Laçi on a contract until the end of the season. He signed the contract on 14th and was given squad number 17. He made his return debut 11 days later in the championship matchday 19 against Partizani Tirana which finished in a 1–1 home draw, with Sosa appearing in the last 15 minutes. Sosa made 10 league appearances until the end of the season, in addition 2 cup matches, as Laçi 5th in championship but won the Albanian Cup. Sosa left the club on 6 June 2015 following the end of the season by terminating the contract by mutual consent.

== Honours ==
Dinamo Tirana

- Albanian Superliga: 2009–10

Skënderbeu Korçë

- Albanian Superliga: 2010–11

Laçi

- Albanian Cup: 2014–15
