= Călărășeuca =

Commune in Moldova

Călărășeuca Călărășovca
- Commune
- Interactive map of Călărășeuca
- Location within Moldova
- Coordinates: 48.4188888889°N 27.8155555556°E
- Country: Moldova
- District: Ocnița District

Population (2014)
  - Total: 2,672
- Time zone: UTC+2 (EET)
  - Summer (DST): UTC+3 (EEST)

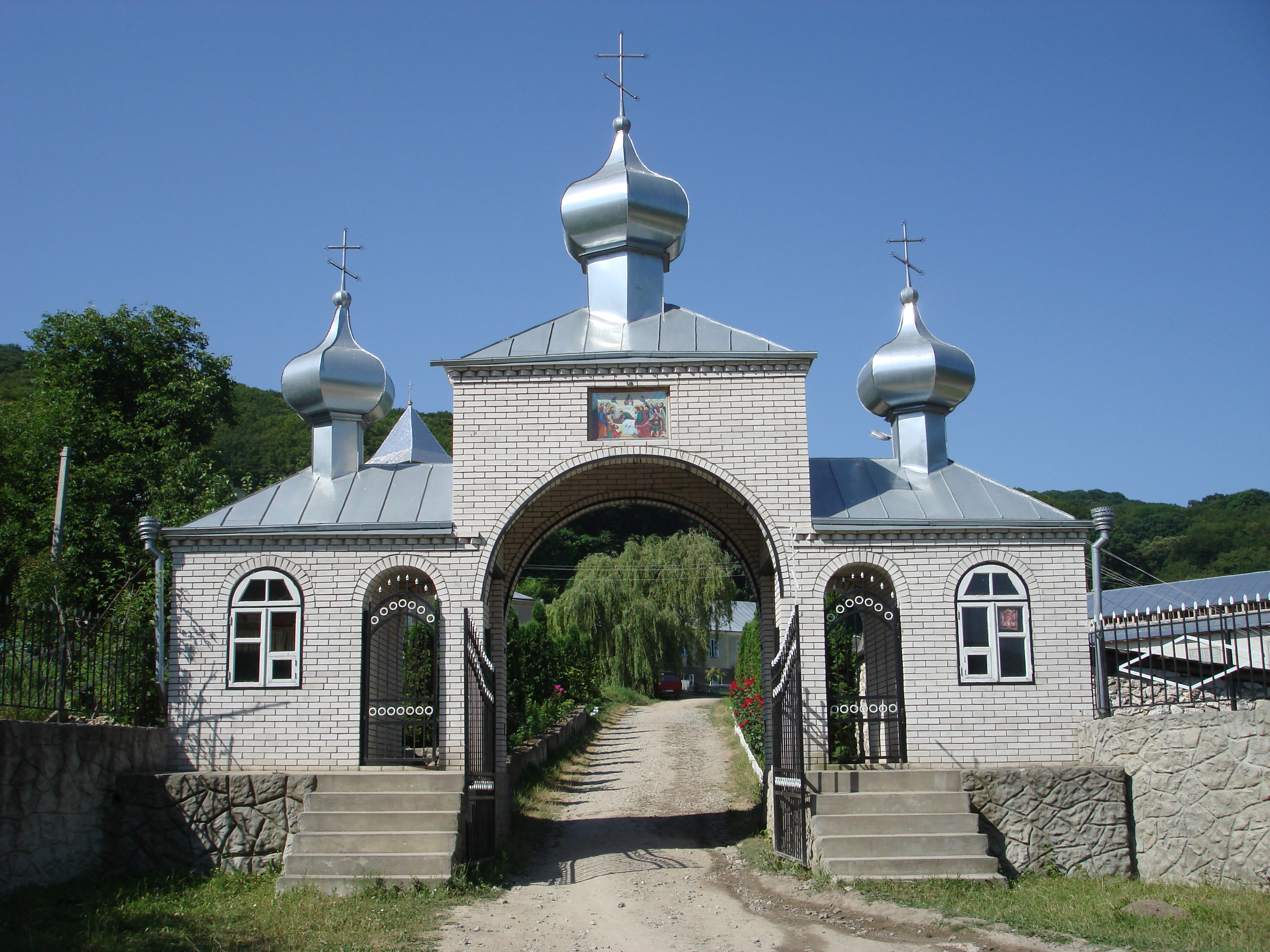
Călărășeuca monastery

Călărășeuca (also Călărașeuca or Calarașovca) is a commune in Ocnița District, Moldova. It is composed of two villages, Berezovca and Calarășeuca. The term literally means "place of călărași"; see Călărași for etymology.

A monument dedicated to Polish Grand Hetman Stanisław Żółkiewski is located in Berezovca village. It is a venue for events organized by the Polish minority in Moldova.

== Natives ==
- Vasile Belous (1988 – 2021), boxer

== See also ==
- Călărășeuca Stadium
