= 2013 Myanmar National League =

Myanmar National League
- Season: 2013
- Champions: Yangon United
- Relegated: Hantharwady United; Rakhine United
- Matches: 132
- Goals: 350 (2.65 per match)
- Top goalscorer: César Augusto (20 goals)
- Biggest home win: Yangon United 4–0 Rakhine United; Yadanarbon 4–0 Manaw Myay
- Biggest away win: Southern Myanmar United 1–6 Kanbawza; Zwekapin United 1–6 Kanbawza
- Highest scoring: Zeyar Shwe Myay 6–3 Rakhine United

The 2013 Myanmar National League season was the 4th edition of Myanmar National League. The fixture schedule was released in the third week of December 2012. The season began on 5 January 2013 and ended on 25 August 2013. At the end of the 2013 season, the top two teams from the MNL-2 New Holland League were promoted to the MNL while the two bottom teams from the MNL were relegated to the MNL-2.

== Teams ==
=== Personnel and kits ===
Note: Flags indicate national team as has been defined under FIFA eligibility rules. Players may hold more than one non-FIFA nationality.

Team	Manager	Shirt sponsor
Ayeyawady United	(North Macedonia) Marjan Sekulovski	
Hantharwady United	(Myanmar) U Ngwe Tun	
Kanbawza	(Singapore) PN Sivaji	KBZ
Magway	(Myanmar) U Kyi Lwin	JOMOO, Green Luck
Manaw Myay	(Myanmar) U Win Myint Twin	
Nay Pyi Taw	(Myanmar) U Myo Hlaing Win	U’JAZZ
Rakhine United	(Myanmar) U Aung Zaw Myo	BELL
Southern Myanmar United	(Australia) (England) Ken Worden	Yuzana
Yadanabon	(Myanmar) U Zaw Lay Aung	M-150
Yangon United	(Bulgaria) Ivan Venkov Kolev	airBagan
Zeyar Shwe Myay	(Myanmar) U Soe Moe	Sky Net
Zwekapin United	(Myanmar) U Aung Min Oo	

== League table ==
Pos	Team	Pld	W	D	L	GF	GA	GD	Pts	Qualification or relegation
1	Yangon United	22	15	4	3	42	20	+22	49	2014 AFC Cup group stage
2	Nay Pyi Taw	22	12	6	4	36	21	+15	42	2014 AFC Cup group stage
3	Kanbawza	22	11	8	3	47	23	+24	41	
4	Zeyar Shwe Myay	22	11	8	3	30	20	+10	41	
5	Yadanabon	22	8	8	6	28	20	+8	32	
6	Magway	22	7	11	4	31	26	+5	32	
7	Ayeyawady United	22	6	11	5	36	33	+3	29	
8	Zwekapin United	22	5	8	9	24	31	−7	23	
9	Manaw Myay	22	4	8	10	23	34	−11	20	
10	Southern Myanmar United	22	5	3	14	15	41	−26	18	
11	Hantharwady United	22	2	8	12	21	39	−18	14	Relegation to 2014 MNL-2
12	Rakhine United	22	2	5	15	23	48	−25	11	Relegation to 2014 MNL-2

== Matches ==
Fixtures and results of the Myanmar National League 2013 season.

=== Week 1 ===
5 January 2013	Kanbawza	0–1	Southern Myanmar	KBZ Stadium, Taunggyi
15:00 UTC+06:30			Ye Aung 07'

5 January 2013	Yadanarbon	1–1	Rakhine United	Bahtoo Stadium, Mandalay
16:00 UTC+06:30	Paulo Pimentel 86' (pen.)		Pyi Moe 72'

5 January 2013	Hantharwady United	0–1	Zeyar Shwe Myay	Thuwunna Stadium, Yangon
16:00 UTC+06:30			Sithu Win 72'

5 January 2013	Yangon United	2–0	Zwekapin United	Yangon United Sports Complex, Yangon
16:00 UTC+06:30	Michael Cvetkovski 17'; Adama Koné 87'

6 January 2013	Magway	1–1	Nay Pyi Taw	Thuwunna Stadium, Yangon
16:00 UTC+06:30	Ivan 86'		Khine Htoo 21'

6 January 2013	Ayeyawady United	0–0	Manaw Myay	Bogyoke Aung San Stadium, Yangon
16:00 UTC+06:30

=== Week 2 ===
12 January 2013	Yadanarbon	1–2	Magway	Bahtoo Stadium, Mandalay
16:00 UTC+06:30	Yan Aung Win 60'		Maung Maung Soe 10'; Myo Zaw Oo 75'

12 January 2013	Nay Pyi Taw	1–1	Ayeyawady United	Paung Laung Stadium, Naypyidaw
16:00 UTC+06:30	Zaw Htet Aung 74'		Marjan Belchev 04'

12 January 2013	Manaw Myay	2–2	Kanbawza	Thuwunna Stadium, Yangon
16:00 UTC+06:30	Assalé 26'; Ibrahim 89'		Mai Aih Naing 39'; Nunes 42'

13 January 2013	Southern Myanmar United	0–1	Hantharwady United	Thuwunna Stadium, Yangon
16:00 UTC+06:30			Aung Myint Tun 43'

13 January 2013	Zwekapin United	0–2	Zeyar Shwe Myay	Bogyoke Aung San Stadium, Yangon
16:00 UTC+06:30			Soe Paing Thway 76'; Saša Ranković 86'

13 January 2013	Yangon United	4–0	Rakhine United	Yangon United Sports Complex, Yangon
16:00 UTC+06:30	César Augusto 7', 25'; Adama Koné 59', 74'

=== Week 3 ===
19 January 2013	Zeyar Shwe Myay	2–0	Southern Myanmar United	Monywa Stadium, Monywa
16:00 UTC+06:30	Saša Ranković 57'; Aung Myo Lwin 79'

19 January 2013	Kanbawza	2–0	Nay Pyi Taw	KBZ Stadium, Taunggyi
15:00 UTC+06:30	Soe Min Oo 55'; Nunes 63'

19 January 2013	Hantharwady United	0–2	Yadanarbon	Thuwunna Stadium, Yangon
16:00 UTC+06:30			Pai Soe 5'; Paulo Pimentel 85'

19 January 2013	Rakhine United	0–1	Zwekapin United	Bogyoke Aung San Stadium, Yangon
16:00 UTC+06:30			Aung Kyaw Zin Oo 54'

20 January 2013	Manaw Myay	1–2	Yangon United	Thuwunna Stadium, Yangon
16:00 UTC+06:30	Kambou 64'		Kyaw Ko Ko 5'; Adama Koné 81'

20 January 2013	Ayeyawady United	2–2	Magway	Bogyoke Aung San Stadium, Yangon
16:00 UTC+06:30	Marjan Belchev 80'; Dominik Beršnjak 90+2'		Almeida 2'; Myo Zaw Oo 48'

=== Week 4 ===
26 January 2013	Zeyar Shwe Myay	1–0	Yangon United	Monywa Stadium, Monywa
16:00 UTC+06:30	Saša Ranković 87'

26 January 2013	Nay Pyi Taw	3–2	Hantharwady United	Paung Laung Stadium, Naypyidaw
18:00 UTC+06:30	Moe Win 42' (pen.); Zaw Lin 72'; Yohance Marshall 90+2'		Min Naung Oo 58'; Aung Myint Tun 80'

26 January 2013	Southern Myanmar United	2–0	Rakhine United	Thuwunna Stadium, Yangon
16:00 UTC+06:30	Zaw Khar 54'; Ye Aung 70'

26 January 2013	Zwekapin United	2–1	Yadanarbon	Bogyoke Aung San Stadium, Yangon
16:00 UTC+06:30	Moe Myint Thu 64'; Nimes Pina 90'		Paulo Pimentel 57'

27 January 2013	Kanbawza	3–0	Ayeyawady United	KBZ Stadium, Yangon
15:00 UTC+06:30	Nunes 2'; Kyaw Zayar Win 36'; Soe Min Oo 86'

27 January 2013	Magway	2–2	Manaw Myay	Thuwunna Stadium, Yangon
16:00 UTC+06:30	Almeida 36' (pen.); Ko Ko Naing 38'		Assalé 27', 45'

=== Week 5 ===
9 February 2013	Yadanarbon	2–0	Zeyar Shwe Myay	Bahtoo Stadium, Mandalay
16:00 UTC+06:30	Kaung Sithu 24'; Yan Paing 49'

9 February 2013	Ayeyawady United	2–0	Rakhine United	Bogyoke Aung San Stadium, Yangon
16:00 UTC+06:30	Leandro Duarte 53'; Nay Lin Tun 90+2'

9 February 2013	Southern Myanmar United	1–2	Magway	Thuwunna Stadium, Yangon
16:00 UTC+06:30	Ye Tun Naing 74'		Sath 24', 36'

9 February 2013	Yangon United	2–0	Nay Pyi Taw	Yangon United Sports Complex, Yangon
15:30 UTC+06:30	Kyaw Ko Ko 56'; Adama Koné 73'

10 February 2013	Hantharwady United	0–4	Kanbawza	Thuwunna Stadium, Yangon
16:00 UTC+06:30			Song 10'; Nunes 64'; Soe Min Oo 78'; Thein Than Win 90+2'

10 February 2013	Zwekapin United	0–0	Manaw Myay	Bogyoke Aung San Stadium, Yangon
16:00 UTC+06:30

=== Week 6 ===
23 March 2013	Kanbawza	1–1	Yadanarbon	KBZ Stadium, Taunggyi
15:30 UTC+06:30	Song In-Houng 11'		Enama 72'

23 March 2013	Zeyar Shwe Myay	6–3	Rakhine United	Monywa Stadium, Monywa
16:00 UTC+06:30	Saša Ranković 16', 24'; Masaki Tokita 49', 54', 60'; Sithu Win 89'		Aung Soe Moe 13', 90+1'; Kaung Myat Oo 59'

23 March 2013	Magway	0–0	Hantharwady United	Thuwunna Stadium, Yangon
16:00 UTC+06:30

23 March 2013	Ayeyawady United	3–1	Yangon United	Bogyoke Aung San Stadium, Yangon
16:00 UTC+06:30	Nanda Lin Kyaw Chit 33', 89'; Nay Lin Tun 52'		César Augusto 77'

24 March 2013	Nay Pyi Taw	2–1	Manaw Myay	Paung Laung Stadium, Naypyidaw
18:00 UTC+06:30	Kone 5'; Min Min Tun 50'		Ibrahim 35'

24 March 2013	Southern Myanmar United	2–2	Zwekapin United	Thuwunna Stadium, Yangon
16:00 UTC+06:30	Ye Aung 1'; Aung Ye Htut 85'		Naing Oo Lwin 33'; Darko 79'

=== Week 7 ===
29 March 2013	Ayeyawady United	2–2	Yadanarbon	Bogyoke Aung San Stadium, Yangon
16:00 UTC+06:30	Leandro Duarte 17'; Satoshi 82'		Enama 12'; Pai Soe 62'

29 March 2013	Yangon United	2–3	Kanbawza	Thuwunna Stadium, Yangon
16:00 UTC+06:30	César Augusto 17' (pen.); Adama Koné 46'		Soe Min Oo 10'; Nunes 27' (pen.), 90+2'

30 March 2013	Zeyar Shwe Myay	1–3	Magway	Monywa Stadium, Monywa
16:00 UTC+06:30	Chukwazu 38'		Maung Maung Soe 14', 32', 47'

30 March 2013	Zwekapin United	0–1	Nay Pyi Taw	Bogyoke Aung San Stadium, Yangon
16:00 UTC+06:30			Tin Zaw Moe 15'

31 March 2013	Manaw Myay	3–0	Southern Myanmar United	Thuwunna Stadium, Yangon
16:00 UTC+06:30	Assalé 47'; Ibrahim 53'; Aye Min Win 73'

31 March 2013	Rakhine United	1–1	Hantharwady United	Bogyoke Aung San Stadium, Yangon
16:00 UTC+06:30	Pina 68'		Aung Min Nyunt 28'

=== Week 8 ===
6 April 2013	Magway	2–2	Yangon United	Thuwunna Stadium, Yangon
16:00 UTC+06:30	Myo Min Latt 9'; Almeida 65'		César Augusto 67' (pen.), 73'

6 April 2013	Ayeyawady United	4–3	Hantharwady United	Bogyoke Aung San Stadium, Yangon
16:00 UTC+06:30	Dominik Beršnjak 13', 26', 73'; Leandro Duarte 23'		Chit Ko Ko 16'; Clitfford 80'; Aung Myint Tun 86'

6 April 2013	Yadanarbon	0–1	Southern Myanmar United	Bahtoo Stadium, Mandalay
16:00 UTC+06:30			Soe Myat Thu 13'

6 April 2013	Kanbawza	1–0	Zwekapin United	KBZ Stadium, Taunggyi
15:30 UTC+06:30	Soe Min Oo 46'

7 April 2013	Nay Pyi Taw	1–1	Zeyar Shwe Myay	Paung Laung Stadium, Naypyidaw
18:00 UTC+06:30	Yohance Marshall 57'		Saša Ranković 29'

7 April 2013	Manaw Myay	2–2	Rakhine United	Thuwunna Stadium, Yangon
16:00 UTC+06:30	Kyaw Swar Lin 12'; Kambou 68'		Pina 4'; Aung Soe Moe 48'

=== Week 9 ===
26 April 2013	Ayeyawady United	2–0	Zwekapin United	Bogyoke Aung San Stadium, Yangon
16:00 UTC+06:30	Leandro 3'; Satoshi 76'

27 April 2013	Kanbawza	0–1	Zeyar Shwe Myay	KBZ Stadium, Taunggyi
15:30 UTC+06:30			Martin 91'

27 April 2013	Nay Pyi Taw	1–0	Yadanarbon	Paung Laung Stadium, Nay Pyi Taw
16:00 UTC+06:30	Jung 70'

28 April 2013	Hantharwady United	1–2	Manaw Myay	Thuwunna Stadium, Yangon
16:00 UTC+06:30	Aung Myint Tun 71'		Assalé 66' (pen.); Wai Lin Aung 84'

28 April 2013	Rakhine United	0–2	Magway	Bogyoke Aung San Stadium, Yangon
16:00 UTC+06:30			Ko Ko Naing 23'; Htoo Htoo Aung 87'

28 April 2013	Yangon United	2–0	Southern Myanmar United	Yangon United Sports Complex, Yangon
16:00 UTC+06:30	César Augusto 37' (pen.); Koné 87'

=== Week 10 ===
4 May 2013	Yadanarbon	4–0	Manaw Myay	Bahtoo Stadium, Mandalay
16:00 UTC+06:30	Kaung Sithu 45', 66', 79'; Yan Aung Win 52'

4 May 2013	Southern Myanmar United	1–2	Nay Pyi Taw	Thuwunna Stadium, Yangon
16:00 UTC+06:30	Aung Ye Htut 18'		Madengue 7', 43'

4 May 2013	Rakhine United	0–2	Kanbawza	Bogyoke Aung San Stadium, Yangon
16:00 UTC+06:30			Soe Min Oo 37', 46'

5 May 2013	Zeyar Shwe Myay	2–2	Ayeyawady United	Monywa Stadium, Monywa
15:30 UTC+06:30	Martin 15', 78'		Nay Lin Tun 54'; Nanda Lin Kyaw Chit 70'

5 May 2013	Hantharwady United	0–2	Yangon United	Thuwunna Stadium, Yangon
16:00 UTC+06:30			César Augusto 40'; Aung Moe 80'

5 May 2013	Zwekapin United	1–1	Magway	Bogyoke Aung San Stadium, Yangon
16:00 UTC+06:30	Naumov 68'		Almeida 50'

=== Week 11 ===
10 May 2013	Manaw Myay	0–0	Zeyar Shwe Myay	Thuwunna Stadium, Yangon
16:00 UTC+06:30

10 May 2013	Rakhine United	2–4	Nay Pyi Taw	Bogyoke Aung San Stadium, Yangon
16:00 UTC+06:30	Aung Soe Moe 40'; Pyi Moe 88'		Min Min Tun 10', 25', 77'; Yohance Marshall 16'

11 May 2013	Southern Myanmar United	0–2	Ayeyawady United	Thuwunna Stadium, Yangon
16:00 UTC+06:30			Dominik Beršnjak 47'; Leandro Duarte 77'

11 May 2013	Zwekapin United	3–1	Hantharwady United	Bogyoke Aung San Stadium, Yangon
16:00 UTC+06:30	Naumov 7', 51'; PToni 4'		Nyi Nyi Naing 59'

12 May 2013	Yangon United	2–2	Yadanabon	Thuwunna Stadium, Yangon
16:00 UTC+06:30	César Augusto 17'; Adama Koné 32'		Aung Myint Aye 14'; D Jan 90+3'

12 May 2013	Magway	2–2	Kanbawza	Bogyoke Aung San Stadium, Yangon
16:00 UTC+06:30	Almedia 17'; Maung Maung Soe 55'		Soe Min Oo 29'; Junior 43'

=== Week 12 ===
18 May 2013	Manaw Myay	1–1	Yadanabon	Thuwunna Stadium, Yangon
16:00 UTC+06:30	Assalé 53'		Yan Paing 81'

18 May 2013	Ayeyawady United	1–2	Zeyar Shwe Myay	Bogyoke Aung San Stadium, Yangon
16:00 UTC+06:30	Leandro Duarte 31'		Si Thu Win 80'; Chukwuazu 86'

19 May 2013	Kanbawza	3–1	Rakhine United	KBZ Stadium, Taunggyi
15:30 UTC+06:30	Nunes 44'; Win Min Htut 70'; Soe Min Oo 85'		Myint Naing 76'

19 May 2013	Nay Pyi Taw	3–0	Southern Myanmar United	Paung Laung Stadium, Naypyidaw
18:00 UTC+06:30	Madengue 32', 38'; Min Min Tun 66'

19 May 2013	Magway	0–0	Zwekapin United	Thuwunna Stadium, Yangon
16:00 UTC+06:30

19 May 2013	Yangon United	3–1	Hantharwady United	Yangon United Sports Complex, Yangon
15:30 UTC+06:30	César Augusto 34' (pen.); Kyi Lin 68', 87'		Abolargi 25'

=== Week 13 ===
15 June 2013	Zwekapin United	2–2	Ayeyawady United	Bogyoke Aung San Stadium, Yangon
16:00 UTC+06:30	Nikolar 10'; Aung Kyaw Oo 82'		Nanda Lin Kyaw Chit 8'; Leandro Duarte 71'

15 June 2013	Southern Myanmar United	0–4	Yangon United	Thuwunna Stadium, Yangon
16:00 UTC+06:30			Min Ko 5' (o.g.); Adama Koné 20'; César Augusto 27', 63'

15 June 2013	Yadanabon	2–0	Nay Pyi Taw	Bahtoo Stadium, Mandalay
16:00 UTC+06:30	Enama 1'; Zaw Min Tun 39'

15 June 2013	Zeyar Shwe Myay	1–1	Kanbawza	Monywa Stadium, Monywa
15:30 UTC+06:30	Saša Ranković 5'		Hla Tun Aung 86'

16 June 2013	Magway	2–1	Rakhine United	Thuwunna Stadium, Yangon
16:00 UTC+06:30	Ko Ko Naing 3', 13'		Pina 56'

16 June 2013	Manaw Myay	1–2	Hantharwady United	Bogyoke Aung San Stadium, Yangon
16:00 UTC+06:30	Htet Aung 51'		Aung Min Nyunt 17'; Fote 90'

=== Week 14 ===
19 June 2013	Yadanabon	0–0	Kanbawza	Bahtoo Stadium, Mandalay
16:00 UTC+06:30

19 June 2013	Yangon United	2–1	Ayeyawady United	Yangon United Sports Complex, Yangon
15:30 UTC+06:30	César Augusto 26'; Adama Koné 49'		Khin Mg Lwin 86' (o.g.)

19 June 2013	Zwekapin United	1–0	Southern Myanmar United	Bogyoke Aung San Stadium, Yangon
16:00 UTC+06:30	Than Htet Aung 82'

20 June 2013	Manaw Myay	0–3	Nay Pyi Taw	Padonmar Stadium, Yangon
16:00 UTC+06:30			Pyae Phyo Oo 52'; Mardangu 77', 90'

20 June 2013	Rakhine United	2–2	Zeyar Shwe Myay	Bogyoke Aung San Stadium, Yangon
16:00 UTC+06:30	Pyi Moe 63'; Pina 69'		Martin 58'; Saša Ranković 70'

20 June 2013	Hantharwady United	1–1	Magway	Thuwunna Stadium, Yangon
16:00 UTC+06:30	Aung Min Nyunt 75'		Nanda Kyaw 37'

=== Week 15 ===
23 June 2013	Ayeyawady United	3–3	Nay Pyi Taw	Bogyoke Aung San Stadium, Yangon
16:00 UTC+06:30	Nanda Lin Kyaw Chit 15'; Leandro Duarte 36'; Hein Thiha Zaw 75'		Mardangu 3', 28'; Kone 48'

24 June 2013	Rakhine United	0–1	Yangon United	Bogyoke Aung San Stadium, Yangon
16:00 UTC+06:30			César Augusto 17'

24 June 2013	Zeyar Shwe Myay	1–1	Zwekapin United	Monywa Stadium, Monywa
15:30 UTC+06:30	Saša Ranković 85'		Naumov 38'

24 June 2013	Kanbawza	3–1	Manaw Myay	KBZ Stadium, Taunggyi
15:30 UTC+06:30	Han Win Aung 20'; Soe Min Oo 52', 81'		Kyaw Swar Lin 43'

24 June 2013	Magway	1–1	Yadanabon	Thuwunna Stadium, Yangon
16:00 UTC+06:30	Ko Ko Naing 31'		Yan Paing 42'

20 June 2013	Hantharwady United	0–0	Southern Myanmar United	Padonmar Stadium, Yangon
16:00 UTC+06:30

=== Week 16 ===
29 June 2013	Hantharwady United	1–1	Rakhine United	Bogyoke Aung San Stadium, Yangon
16:00 UTC+06:30	Aung Min Nyunt 53'		Chit Min Soe 9' (pen.)

29 June 2013	Southern Myanmar United	0–3	Manaw Myay	Thuwunna Stadium, Yangon
16:00 UTC+06:30			Assalé 12', 17', 45'

29 June 2013	Kanbawza	1–1	Yangon United	KBZ Stadium, Taunggyi
15:30 UTC+06:30	Henson 74'		César Augusto 1'

30 June 2013	Nay Pyi Taw	1–1	Zwekapin United	Paung Laung Stadium, Naypyidaw
18:00 UTC+06:30	Madengue 80'		Tin 22'

30 June 2013	Yadanabon	1–0	Ayeyawady United	Bahtoo Stadium, Mandalay
16:00 UTC+06:30	Aung Myint Aye 21'

24 June 2013	Magway	0–1	Zeyar Shwe Myay	Thuwunna Stadium, Yangon
16:00 UTC+06:30			Martin 74'

=== Week 17 ===
4 July 2013	Hantharwady United	0–2	Nay Pyi Taw	Thuwunna Stadium, Yangon
16:00 UTC+06:30			Madengue 24', 30' (pen.)

4 July 2013	Rakhine United	2–3	Southern Myanmar United	Bogyoke Aung San Stadium, Yangon
16:00 UTC+06:30	Pina 16'; Chit Min Soe 51'		Yan Naing Htwe 47', 59', 77'

5 July 2013	Yadanabon	2–1	Zwekapin United	Bahtoo Stadium, Mandalay
16:00 UTC+06:30	Thet Naing 32'; D Jan 72' (pen.)		Zon Moe Aung 15'

5 July 2013	Yangon United	3–2	Zeyar Shwe Myay	Yangon United Sports Complex, Yangon
15:30 UTC+06:30	Adama Koné 21'; César Augusto 45', 80'		Si Thu Win 8'; Martin 85'

5 July 2013	Manaw Myay	3–1	Magway	Thuwunna Stadium, Yangon
16:00 UTC+06:30	Kyaw Swar Lin 74'; Assalé 31', 70'		Sath 54'

5 July 2013	Ayeyawady United	2–2	Kanbawza	Bahtoo Stadium, Mandalay
16:00 UTC+06:30	Dominik Beršnjak 32'; Leandro Duarte 34'		Win Min Htut 16'; Nunes 89' (pen.)

=== Week 18 ===
10 July 2013	Southern Myanmar United	0–1	Zeyar Shwe Myay	Thuwunna Stadium, Yangon
16:00 UTC+06:30			Chukwuazu 5'

10 July 2013	Zwekapin United	2–4	Rakhine United	Bahtoo Stadium, Mandalay
16:00 UTC+06:30	Naumov 43'; Naing Naing Kyaw 55'		Myint Naing 17', 78'; Pina 45', 57'

10 July 2013	Yadanabon	2–1	Hantharwady United	Bahtoo Stadium, Mandalay
16:00 UTC+06:30	Yan Paing 13', 73'		Aung Myint Tun 65'

11 July 2013	Yangon United	2–1	Manaw Myay	Yangon United Sports Complex, Yangon
15:30 UTC+06:30	César Augusto 29' (pen.); Kyi Lin 56'		Tin Win Myint 33'

11 July 2013	Magway	2–1	Ayeyawady United	Thuwunna Stadium, Yangon
16:00 UTC+06:30	Nanda Kyaw 39'; Soe Min Naing 61'		Min Min Thu 80'

11 July 2013	Nay Pyi Taw	2–0	Kanbawza	Paung Laung Stadium, Naypyidaw
18:00 UTC+06:30	Madengue 79'; Jung 83'

=== Week 19 ===
16 July 2013	Zwekapin United	0–1	Yangon United	Bogyoke Aung San Stadium, Yangon
16:00 UTC+06:30			Adama Koné 25'

16 July 2013	Southern Myanmar United	1–6	Kanbawza	Thuwunna Stadium, Yangon
16:00 UTC+06:30	Zaw Khar 14'		Henson 7'; Sa Htet Naing Win 27'; Soe Min Oo 32', 62'; Nunes 74'; Mai Aih Naing 87'

16 July 2013	Zeyar Shwe Myay	0–0	Hantharwady United	Monywa Stadium, Monywa
15:30 UTC+06:30

17 July 2013	Manaw Myay	0–0	Ayeyawady United	Thuwunna Stadium, Yangon
16:00 UTC+06:30

17 July 2013	Rakhine United	0–1	Yadanabon	Bogyoke Aung San Stadium, Yangon
16:00 UTC+06:30			Thet Naing 10'

17 July 2013	Nay Pyi Taw	2–0	Magway	Paung Laung Stadium, Naypyidaw
18:00 UTC+06:30	Pyae Phyo Oo 68'; Kone 93'

=== Week 20 ===
22 July 2013	Ayeyawady United	1–1	Southern Myanmar United	Bogyoke Aung San Stadium, Yangon
16:00 UTC+06:30	Leandro Duarte 75'		Yan Naing Htwe 23'

22 July 2013	Hantharwady United	1–1	Zwekapin United	Thuwunna Stadium, Yangon
16:00 UTC+06:30	Abolargi 75'		Naing Oo Lwin 23'

23 July 2013	Yadanabon	1–1	Yangon United	Bahtoo Stadium, Mandalay
16:00 UTC+06:30	Enama 6'		Si Thu Aung 70'

23 July 2013	Nay Pyi Taw	3–0	Rakhine United	Paung Laung Stadium, Naypyidaw
18:00 UTC+06:30	Tin Zaw Moe 15'; Kone 53'; Aung Kyaw Naing 68'

23 July 2013	Zeyar Shwe Myay	1– 0	Manaw Myay	Monywa Stadium, Monywa
15:30 UTC+06:30	Chukwuazu 50'

23 July 2013	Kanbawza	1–1	Magway	KBZ Stadium, Taunggyi
15:30 UTC+06:30	Soe Min Oo 88'		Sath 60'

=== Week 21 ===
28 July 2013	Hantharwady United	2–2	Ayeyawady United	Thuwunna Stadium, Yangon
16:00 UTC+06:30	Aung Min Nyunt 41'; Clitfford 90+2' (pen.)		Satoshi 71'; Soe Kyaw Kyaw 88'

28 July 2013	Rakhine United	1–0	Manaw Myay	Bogyoke Aung San Stadium, Yangon
16:00 UTC+06:30	Myat Min Thu 8'

29 July 2013	Yangon United	2–1	Magway	Yangon United Sports Complex, Yangon
15:30 UTC+06:30	Adama Koné 67'; César Augusto 86'		Ko Ko Naing 60'

29 July 2013	Zeyar Shwe Myay	1–1	Nay Pyi Taw	Monywa Stadium, Monywa
15:30 UTC+06:30	Aung Bo Bo Win 20'		Pyae Phyo Oo 82'

29 July 2013	Zwekapin United	1–6	Kanbawza	Bogyoke Aung San Stadium, Yangon
16:00 UTC+06:30	Aung Kyaw Oo 35'		Sa Htet Naing Win 5', 47'; Soe Min Oo 28'; Henson 38'; Nunes 46'; Saw Sein Ba Myint 86' (OG.)

29 July 2013	Southern Myanmar United	2–1	Yadanabon	Thuwunna Stadium, Yangon
16:00 UTC+06:30	Aung Ye Htut 46'; Yan Naing Htwe 63'		Yan Aung Win 87'

=== Week 22 ===
3 August 2013	Rakhine United	2–3	Ayeyawady United	Bogyoke Aung San Stadium, Yangon
16:00 UTC+06:30	Myint Naing 47'; Kyaw Min Oo 51'		Dominik Beršnjak 27'; Leandro Duarte 57'; Soe Kyaw Kyaw 70'

3 August 2013	Manaw Myay	0–5	Zwekapin United	Thuwunna Stadium, Yangon
16:00 UTC+06:30		Kim 45', 85'; Nikolar 49'; PToni 65'; Naing Oo Lwin 71'

4 August 2013	Magway	3–0	Southern Myanmar United	Thuwunna Stadium, Yangon
16:00 UTC+06:30	Soe Min Naing 5'; Myo Zaw Oo 59'; Maung Maung Soe 81'

4 August 2013	Kanbawza	4–3	Hantharwady United	KBZ Stadium, Taunggyi
15:30 UTC+06:30	Nunes 1', 11'; Inyoung 50'; Sa Htet Naing Win 81'		Clitfford 56', 86'; Aung Min Nyunt 80'

4 August 2013	Zeyar Shwe Myay	1–0	Yadanabon	Monywa Stadium, Monywa
15:30 UTC+06:30	Martin 79'

4 August 2013	Nay Pyi Taw	0–1	Yangon United	Wunna Theikdi Stadium, Naypyidaw
18:00 UTC+06:30			César Augusto 35' (pen.)

== Results ==
Home \ Away	ATD	KAN	HAN	MAG	MAM	NPT	RUD	SMD	YAD	YUD	ZSM	ZTD
Ayeyawady United		2–2	4–3	2–2	0–0	3–3	2–0	1–1	2–2	3–1	1–2	2–0
Kanbawza	3–0		4–3	1–1	3–1	2–0	3–1	0–1	1–1	1–1	0–1	1–0
Hantharwady United	2–2	0–4		1–1	1–2	0–2	1–1	0–0	0–2	0–2	0–1	1–1
Magway	2–1	2–2	0–0		2–2	1–1	2–1	3–0	1–1	2–2	0–1	0–0
Manaw Myay	0–0	2–2	1–2	3–1		0–3	2–2	3–0	1–1	1–2	0–0	0–5
Nay Pyi Taw	1–1	2–0	3–2	2–0	2–1		3–0	3–0	1–0	0–1	1–1	1–1
Rakhine United	2–3	0–2	1–1	0–2	1–0	2–4		2–3	0–1	0–1	2–2	0–1
Southern Myanmar United	0–2	1–6	0–1	1–2	0–3	1–2	2–0		2–1	0–4	0–1	2–2
Yadanabon	1–0	0–0	2–1	1–2	4–0	2–0	1–1	0–1		1–1	2–0	2–1
Yangon United	2–1	2–3	3–1	2–1	2–1	2–0	4–0	2–0	2–2		3–2	2–0
Zeya Shwe Myay	2–2	1–1	0–0	1–3	1–0	1–1	6–3	2–0	1–0	1–0		1–1
Zwegabin United	2–2	1–6	3–1	1–1	0–0	0–1	2–4	1–0	2–1	0–1	0–2	

Updated to match(es) played on 4 August 2013. Source: Myanmar National League
Legend: Blue = home team win; Yellow = draw; Red = away team win.

== Season statistics ==
=== Top scorers ===
No	Player	Club	Goals
1	(Brazil) César Augusto	Yangon United	20
2	(Myanmar) Soe Min Oo	Kanbawza	15
3	(Ivory Coast) Adama Koné	Yangon United	13
3	(Brazil) Nunes	Kanbawza	13
5	(Ivory Coast) Assalé	Manaw Myay	11
5	(Brazil) Leandro Duarte	Ayeyawady United	11
7	(Serbia) Saša Ranković	Zeyar Shwe Myay	9
8	(Guinea-Bissau) Nimês Pina	Rakhine United	8
9	(Slovenia) Dominik Beršnjak	Ayeyawady United	7
10	Martin	Zeyar Shwe Myay	6

=== Hat-tricks ===
Player	For	Against	Result	Date
(Japan) Masaki Tokita	Zeyar Shwe Myay	Rakhine United	6–3	23 March 2013
(Myanmar) Maung Maung Soe	Magway	Zeyar Shwe Myay	3–1	30 March 2013
(Slovenia) Dominik Beršnjak	Ayeyawady United	Hantharwady United	4–3	6 April 2013
(Myanmar) Kaung Sithu	Yadanarbon	Manaw Myay	4–0	4 May 2013
(Myanmar) Min Min Tun	Nay Pyi Taw	Rakhine United	4–2	10 May 2013
(Ivory Coast) Assalé	Manaw Myay	Southern Myanmar United	3–0	29 June 2013
(Myanmar) Yan Naing Htwe	Southern Myanmar United	Rakhine United	3–2	4 July 2013

== Awards ==
=== Monthly awards ===
Month	Manager of the Month		Player of the Month	
Month	Manager	Club	Player	Club
March/April	(Myanmar) U Myo Hlaing Win	Nay Pyi Taw	(Korea) Jung	Nay Pyi Taw
May/June	(Bulgaria) Ivan Venkov Kolev	Yangon United	(Myanmar) Ya Zar Win Thein	Yangon United
June/July	(Myanmar) U Zaw Lay Aung	Yadanabon	(Myanmar) Yan Paing	Yadanabon
