= 2016 Magway F.C. season =

Magway
2016 season
- Owner: (Myanmar) U Tun Myint Naing
- Manager: (Myanmar) U Kyi Lwin
- Stadium: Magway Stadium
- Top goalscorer: (Myanmar) Soe Min Naing

== Sponsorship ==
Period	Sportswear	Sponsor
2016	(Thailand) Grand Sport	

== Staffs ==
- U Soe Min – Manager
- U Kyi Lwin – Head Coach
- U Zaw Min Tun – Assistant Coach
- U Chit Naing – Assiant Coach
- U Maung Maung Htay – Assistant Coach
- U Myo Kyaw Thu – GK Coach
- U Paw Tun Kayw – Assistant Coach
- U Nyi Nyi Kayw Myint – Media Officer
- .U Aung Myo Lwin – secretary
- U Tin Aung Moe- Nurse

=== Other information ===
Owner	(Myanmar) U Tun Myint Naing
Ground (capacity and dimensions)	Magway Stadium (7,000 / 103x67 metres)
Training Ground	Magway Stadium

=== 2016 First team squad ===
Note: Flags indicate national team as defined under FIFA eligibility rules; some limited exceptions apply. Players may hold more than one non-FIFA nationality.

No.	Pos.	Nation	Player
1	GK	(Myanmar) MYA	Ye Phyo Aung
2	DF	(Myanmar) MYA	Nay Zaw Aung
3	DF	(Myanmar) MYA	Naing Lin Tun
4	MF	(Myanmar) MYA	Set Phyo Wai
5	DF	(Myanmar) MYA	Nanda Kyaw
6	DF	(Myanmar) MYA	Nay Min Tun
7	MF	(Myanmar) MYA	Htoo Htoo Aung
8	FW	(Myanmar) MYA	Soe Min Naing (Captain)
9	FW	(Myanmar) MYA	Thann Zaw Hein
10	FW	(Myanmar) MYA	Maung Maung Soe
11	MF	(Myanmar) MYA	Ko Ko Naing
12	DF	(Myanmar) MYA	Kyaw Zin Lwin
13	DF	(Myanmar) MYA	Van Lar Chaung Arr
14	MF	(Myanmar) MYA	Khine Htoo
15	FW	(Guinea) GUI	Sylla

No.	Pos.	Nation	Player
16	DF	(Myanmar) MYA	Thant Zin Win
17	MF	(Myanmar) MYA	Aung Show Thar Maung
18	GK	(Myanmar) MYA	Kyaw Zin Phyo
19	MF	(Myanmar) MYA	Naing Naing Kyaw
20	DF	(Nigeria) NGA	Micheal Henry Alloysius
21	FW	(Myanmar) MYA	Cho Tun
22	GK	(Myanmar) MYA	Aung Myo Zaw
23	MF	(Myanmar) MYA	Hein Zar Aung
24	DF	(Myanmar) MYA	Win Moe Kyaw
25	DF	(Myanmar) MYA	Myo Min Zaw
26	DF	(Myanmar) MYA	Lwin Myo Aung
27	FW	(Myanmar) MYA	Aung Soe Moe
30	DF	(Cameroon) CMR	Di Jam

== Transfers ==
In: Note: Flags indicate national team as defined under FIFA eligibility rules; some limited exceptions apply. Players may hold more than one non-FIFA nationality.

No.	Pos.	Nation	Player
—	MF	(Myanmar) MYA	Aung Soe Moe (from Rakhine United FC)
—	DF	(Myanmar) MYA	Naing Naing Kyaw (from Rakhine United FC)
—	MF	(Myanmar) MYA	Khine Htoo (from Rakhine United FC)
—	MF	(Myanmar) MYA	Nay Zaw Aung (from Nay Pyi Taw FC)
—		(Myanmar) MYA	Vanlal Chong Ar (from GFA FC)

Out: Note: Flags indicate national team as defined under FIFA eligibility rules; some limited exceptions apply. Players may hold more than one non-FIFA nationality.

No.	Pos.	Nation	Player
—	DF	(Myanmar) MYA	Wai Yan (to Contract end)
—	MF	(Myanmar) MYA	Kyaw Myint Tun (to Contract end)
—	FW	(Myanmar) MYA	Myo Zaw Oo (to Contract end)
