= 2017 MFF Charity Cup =

Myanmar football match

Magwe	Yadanarbon
3	0
- Date: 8 January 2017
- Venue: Aung San Stadium, Yangon
- Man of the Match: (Guinea) Sylla Sekou (Magwe)
- Referee: (Myanmar) U Khin Maung Win
- Attendance: 7,000
- Weather: Cloudy; 29 °C (84 °F)

The 2017 MFF Charity Cup is the 6th MFF Charity Cup, an annual Myanmar football match played between the winners of the previous season's Myanmar National League and 2016 General Aung San Shield. The match was contested by Magwe, the 2016 General Aung San Shield winners, and Yadanarbon, champions of the 2016 Myanmar National League.

This was Yadanarbon's 2nd Cup appearance and Magwe's first.

== Match ==
=== Details ===
8 January 2017
16:00 MST

Magwe	3 - 0	Yadanarbon
(Cameroon) Sekou Sylla 47', 68' (Myanmar) Maung Maung Soe 90'	Report

Bogyoke Aung San Stadium, Yangon
Referee: (Myanmar) U Khin Maung Win

Magwe	Yadanarbon

GK	18	(Myanmar) Kyaw Zin Phyo
RB	12	(Myanmar) Kyaw Zin Lwin		(substituted off) 68'
CB	2	(Mali) Jean-Paul Hinako Oulaï
CB	20	(Nigeria) Micheal Henry	(yellow card) 64'
LB	5	(Myanmar) Nanda Kyaw
RM	10	(Myanmar) Maung Maung Soe	(yellow card) 23'
CM	23	(Myanmar) Hein Zar Aung		(substituted off) 87'
CM	4	(Myanmar) Set Phyo Wai
LM	11	(Myanmar) Ko Ko Naing		(substituted off) 66'
AM	7	(Myanmar) Htoo Htoo Aung (c)
CF	25	(Guinea) Sekou Sylla
Substitutes:
GK	1	(Myanmar) Ye Phyo Aung
DF	3	(Myanmar) Naing Lin Tun		(substituted on) 68'
MF	8	(Myanmar) Swam Htet Aung
FW	9	(Myanmar) Than Zaw Hein
DF	14	(Myanmar) Kyaw Swar Lin		(substituted on) 87'
DF	16	(Myanmar) Thant Zin Win
MF	19	(Myanmar) Naing Naing Kyaw		(substituted on) 66'
Manager:
(Myanmar) U Zaw Win Tun

GK	25	(Myanmar) Pyae Lyan Aung
RB	16	(Myanmar) Myo Ko Tun		(substituted off) 34'
CB	2	(Cameroon) William
CB	30	(Myanmar) Nay Myo Aung		(substituted off) 70'
LB	3	(Myanmar) Thein Than Win
CM	9	(Myanmar) Yan Paing (c)
CM	14	(Nigeria) Esoh Omogba		(substituted off) 63'
RW	11	(Myanmar) Thet Naing		(substituted off) 85'
LW	17	(Myanmar) Myo Zaw Oo		(substituted off) 46'
CF	8	(Myanmar) Aung Thu
CF	10	(Togo) Odah Marshall
Substitutes:
GK	1	(Myanmar) Yan Aung Lin
DF	5	(Myanmar) Sithu Aung		(substituted on) 85'
DF	6	(Myanmar) Ye Yint Aung
MF	7	(Myanmar) Ye Ko Oo	(yellow card) 74'	(substituted on) 34'
MF	20	(Myanmar) Shine Thura		(substituted on) 63'
FW	27	(Japan) Yuya Wada		(substituted on) 70'
FW	29	(Myanmar) Win Naing Soe		(substituted on) 46'
Manager:
(Belgium) René Desaeyere

Man of the match

- (Guinea) Sylla (Magwe)

Match officials

- Assistant referees:
  - (Myanmar) U Win Thiha
  - (Myanmar) U Zayar Maung
- Fourth official: (Myanmar) U Soe Lin Aung
- Reserve official: (Myanmar) U Khin Maung Thein
- Match Commissioner: (Myanmar) U Tun Tun Aung

Match rules

- 90 minutes.
- Penalty shoot-out if scores still level.
- Seven named substitutes.
- Maximum of five substitutions.

=== Statistics ===
Statistic	Magwe	Yadanarbon
Goals scored	3	0
Possession	45%	55%
Shots on target	6	6
Shots off target	2	4
Corner kicks	0	5
Fouls	12	22
Offsides	0	2
Yellow cards	2	1
Red cards	0	0

== See also ==
- MNL
- MFF
