= 2015 Magway F.C. season =

Magway
2015 season
- Owner: (Myanmar) U Tun Myint Naing
- Manager: (Myanmar) U Kyi Lwin
- Stadium: Magway Stadium
- Myanmar National League: 3rd
- Bogyoke Aung San Cup: loss in Semi-final
- Top goalscorer: (Myanmar) Soe Min Naing

== Sponsorship ==
Period	Sportswear	Sponsor
2015	(Thailand) Grand Sport	

== Club ==
=== Coaching staff ===
Position	Staff
Manager	(Myanmar) U Kyi Lwin
Assistant Manager	(Myanmar) U Soe Min
Goalkeeper Coach	
Fitness Coach	

Source: Magwe FC

=== Other information ===
Owner	(Myanmar) U Tun Myint Naing
Ground (capacity and dimensions)	Magway Stadium (7,000 / 103x67 metres)
Training Ground	Magway Stadium

== General Aung San Shield ==
Date	Round	Team 1	Result	Team 2
12/7/2015	2nd	Magway	1 – 0	Chin United
1/8/2015	Quarter-final	Magway	2 – 0	GFA FC
12/8/2015	Semi-final (1st leg)	Yadanarbon	6 – 0	Magway
22/9/2015	Semi-final (2nd leg)	Magway	0 – 2	Yadanarbon

=== First team squad ===
As of 4 August 2015.

Squad No.	Name	Nationality	Position(s)	Date of birth (age)
Goalkeepers
1	Ye Phyo Aung	(Myanmar)	GK	
18	Kyaw Zin Phyo	(Myanmar)	GK	1 February 1994 (age 32)
30	Aung Myo Zaw	(Myanmar)	GK	
Defenders
2	Wai Yan	(Myanmar)	RB	8 August 1992 (age 33)
3	Nyi Nyi Win	(Myanmar)	CB / DM	
4	Min Kyaw Thu Lin	(Myanmar)	CB	
5	Nanda Kyaw	(Myanmar)	LB	3 September 1996 (age 29)
6	Nay Min Tun	(Myanmar)	CB / RB	
12	Kyaw Zin Lwin	(Myanmar)	RB	
13	Kyaw Kyaw Tun	(Myanmar)	CB / RB	
14	Naing Lin Tun	(Myanmar)	RB	
20	Micheal Henry Alloysius	(Nigeria)	CB	
Midfielders
7	Htoo Htoo Aung	(Myanmar)	RW	
10	Maung Maung Soe	(Myanmar)	RW / RB/LW	6 August 1995 (age 30)
11	Ko Ko Naing	(Myanmar)	CM / AM	
15	Myat Hein Kyaw	(Myanmar)	CM	
16	Thant Zin Win	(Myanmar)	RB / RW	20 December 1992 (age 33)
17	Aung Show Thar Maung	(Myanmar)	CM / AM	
22	Di Jam	(Cameroon)	CM / AM	
23	Hein Zar Aung	(Myanmar)	RW/LW	
24	Kyaw Myint Tun	(Myanmar)	CM	20 May 1991 (age 34)
25	Myo Min Zaw	(Myanmar)	DM / CM	
26	Sat Phyo Wai	(Myanmar)	AM / RW	
Strikers
8	Soe Min Naing (captain)	(Myanmar)	CF / RW	1 July 1990 (age 35)
9	Myo Zaw Oo	(Myanmar)	CF	21 October 1992 (age 33)
19	Kaung Sat Naing	(Myanmar)	CF	
21	Sylla Sekou	(Guinea)	CF	
27	Than Zaw Hein	(Myanmar)	CF / LW	
28	Cho Tun	(Myanmar)	CF / LW	
