= KKY =

KKY may refer to:

- Kappa Kappa Psi (ΚΚΨ), United States national honorary band fraternity
- Kilkenny Airport, Ireland, IATA airport code KKY
- Kalau Kawau Ya (KKY), one of the western and central Torres Strait languages, see Kala Lagaw Ya
- Ka Kwe Ye, government defence militia in Burma, see Lo Hsing Han
- Library of Congress classification for Ukraine law since 1991, see Library of Congress Classification:Class K -- Law - Europe

== See also ==
- Kim Ki-young (1922–1998), South Korean film director
