= Myanmar–Singapore relations =

Bilateral relations of Myanmar and Singapore

- Myanmar: Singapore

Diplomatic mission
- Embassy of Singapore in Yangon: Embassy of Myanmar in Singapore

Myanmar–Singapore relations are bilateral relations between Myanmar and Singapore.

The two countries have a shared history as former British colonies. During the 20th century, authoritarian Burmese governments formed a strong bond with Singapore as a key friendly trading partner in the wake of much of the world condemning the Burmese junta. This close relation strained Burmese democracy activists' perceptions of Singapore. In 1996, Singaporean Prime Minister Lee Kuan Yew's statements questioning Aung San Suu Kyi's ability to govern prompted protests at the Singaporean embassy in Yangon.

Singapore remained one of Myanmar's top investors and trading partners Both countries are part of the Association of Southeast Asian Nations (ASEAN). In 2020-21, Singapore was Myanmar's largest foreign investor with US$161.14 billion invested that fiscal year.

After the 2021 Myanmar coup d'état, Singapore adopted strident language and drew a line when the military regime used lethal force on protestors. During Myanmar's current war, Singapore remained a major equipment supplier for the junta's weapons factories. Several Singapore-based firms served as intermediary companies collectively shipping US$254 million worth of arms to the junta between 2021 and 2023. Singaporean businesses have grown wary of continuing business since 2021 and United Overseas Bank, a key Singaporean bank has begun cutting financial ties with Myanmar. As of 2023, Singapore does not recognize the military junta, but also states that it does not believe in foreign interference in domestic affairs.

== History ==
Myanmar, then Burma, and Singapore established formal diplomatic relations on 12 April 1966 shortly after Singapore's independence from Malaysia in 1965. In 1984, Singapore opened its embassy in Yangon.

The two nations had a long and enduring relationship as neighbors and as one of Burma's few trading partners and friends to the regime after the military's crackdown on the pro-democracy 8888 Uprising in 1988. Singapore, like many other Asian governments silent at the time, were accused of supporting the repressive State Law and Order Restoration Council (SLORC) government. Singapore defended its stance as constructive engagement towards the regime. However, as Singapore took in several prominent Burmese nationals connected with the regimes, including the two dictators Ne Win and Than Shwe, many Burmese activists and dissidents have difficulty viewing Singapore as a friend of the democracy movement.

In 1996, elder statesman Lee Kuan Yew told foreign reporters that Burma could only be ruled by the military suggesting democracy activist Aung San Suu Kyi stay "behind a fence, and be a symbol" These remarks let to protests within Burma and overseas, with Burmese students in New Delhi burning an effigy of Lee. Suu Kyi responded by defend Lee's freedom of expression while criticizing how he failed to understand the lack of free expression within Burma. In the 1990s, Lee Kuan Yew was seen as a core architect of the Asian values ideology, which contrasts Asian duties with European ideals of human rights. Suu Kyi, along with other prominent Asian leaders, rejected the illiberal and antidemocratic elements adopting a stance that universal rights were not incompatible with indigenous values.

In addition, Singaporean banks have been accused of money laundering for Burmese narcotics- especially being tied to Lo Hsing Han, who has been called the "Godfather of Heroin" by the United States Treasury. In 2010, the United States sanctioned ten Singaporean companies owned in connection to Lo. Another subject of allegations has been the Government of Singapore Investment Corporation (GIC)'s investments in the Myanmar Fund, a Hong Kong-based fund launched in 1994. The Myanmar Fund was accused of collaborating with SLORC and drug traffickers for owning stakes in Burmese companies owned by Steven Law, Lo Hsing Han's son. In 1996, Singapore stated in a press release that GIC no longer holds shares in the Myanmar Fund and that any past investments were uninvolved with narcotics of Steven Law

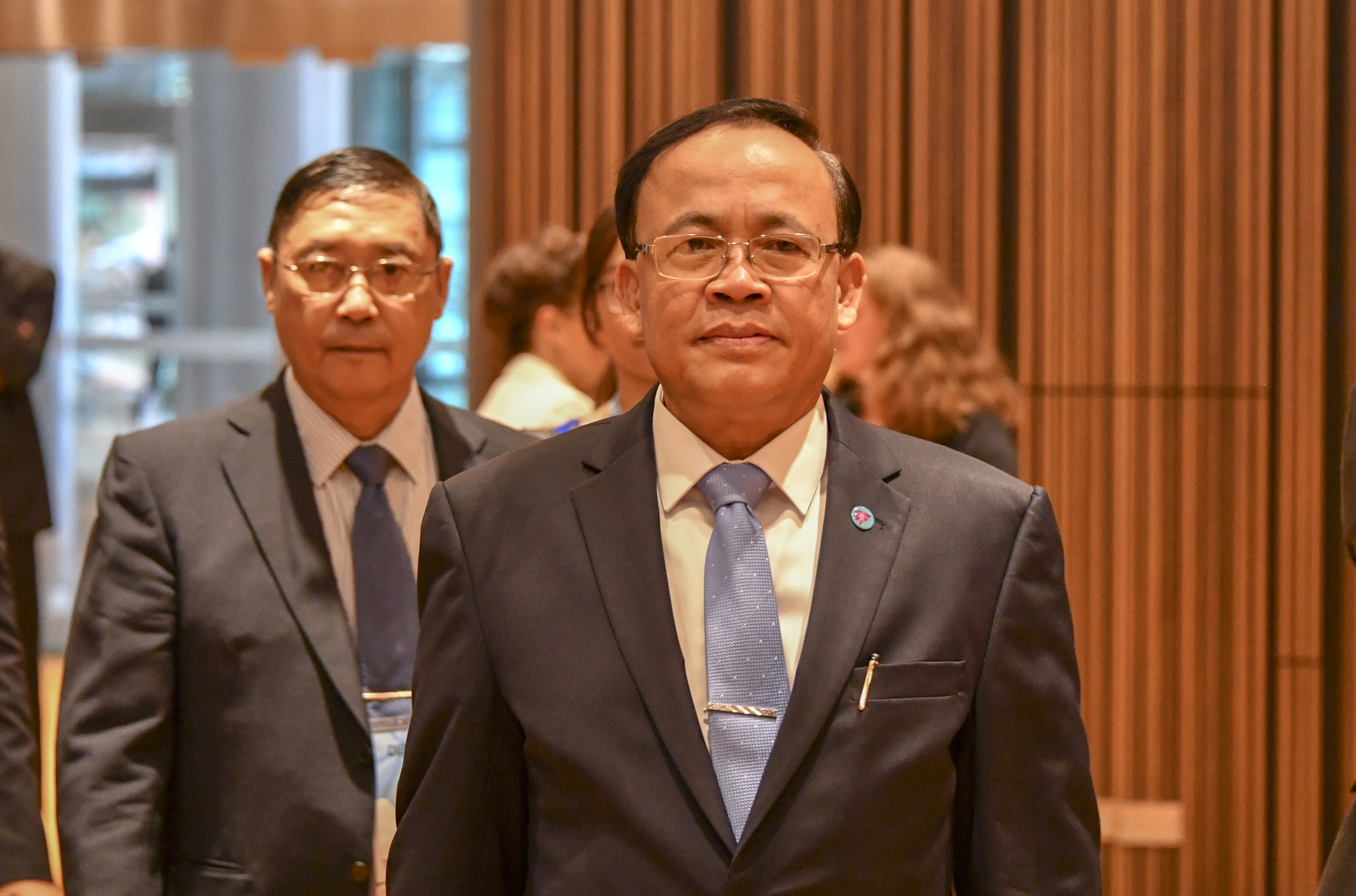
Burmese foreign minister Tin at the 33rd ASEAN Summit in Singapore

In the 21st century, the Singapore Cooperation Programme has been involved with Myanmar, supporting human resource development and vocational training. The Singapore-Myanmar Vocational Training Institute (SMVTI) was launched in 2016 during a state visit by Prime Minister Lee Hsien Loong. The SMVTI was formally handed over to Myanmar in 2020. In 2020, Singapore was the largest trading and investment partner of Myanmar with US$161.14 billion invested in 2020-21 and $2.7 billion worth of exports to Myanmar in 2020.

=== Recent relations ===
After the 1 February 2021 Myanmar coup d'état, when Min Aung Hlaing ousted the NLD democratic government, Burmese protestors urged Singapore to cut business ties with the military regime through demonstrations in Myanmar and with boycotts of Singaporean brands. Singaporean foreign minister Vivian Balakrishnan initially emphasized the importance of separating business with politics, but as Singaporean businesses became more wary of continuing business in Myanmar, changed Singapore's position to one of managing risks. Balakrishnan further refrained from referring to the military regime's representative as "foreign minister", signaling a clear line being drawn. Lee Hsien Loong used unusually strident language like calling the use of lethal force "disastrous" and the military crackdowns as a "national shame". According to analysts, Singapore's decided to be more visible with its foreign policy due to worries over regional instability and the credibility of the Association of Southeast Asian Nations (ASEAN).

As the protests and situation in Myanmar turned into renewed civil war, Singapore was pressured to take more action. Both the United States State Department and local activists cited Singapore as an important regional actor with significant leverage as Singapore had means to limit the military regime's access to overseas financial assets. In 2022, Prime Minister Lee maintained his diplomatic position, supporting the continued exclusion of the military regime from ASEAN meetings until the regime showed actioned cooperation on ASEAN's peace plans. In 2023, Balakrishnan stated that he did not believe the Myanmar coup would lead to national reconciliation and that Singapore does not recognise the current military junta. He emphasized that Singapore does not believe in the foreign interference in domestic affairs and will keep a seat open in ASEAN for non-political representatives or when a legitimate government is recognized as such.

During the war, Singapore remained a major source of spare parts and manufacturing equipment for the junta's weapons factories. Several Singapore-based firms served as intermediary companies collectively shipping US$254 million worth of arms to the junta between 2021 and 2023. Civil society organisations have urged targeted sanctions to block the junta's access to Singapore's financial system. In August, key Singaporean bank United Overseas Bank (UOB) began cutting off banking relationships with Myanmar accounts, announced restrictions on card transactions for Myanmar individuals and closed Burmese nostro accounts in UOB's Hong Kong branches. Some see the move as a response of pressure placed on Singapore to cut financial ties with the junta, while others see the move as reflective of growing costs and risks of doing business with Myanmar's military regime.

In October 2023, the military regime revoked the passports of Myanmar nationals in Singapore, targeting anti-coup activists living in Singapore. The regime only revoked the passports of nationals in Singapore, catching many Burmese in Singapore by surprise. The junta has also reportedly lodged complaints about anti-junta activities amongst Myanmar nationals in Singapore to the Singapore Police Force.

== Cultural relations ==
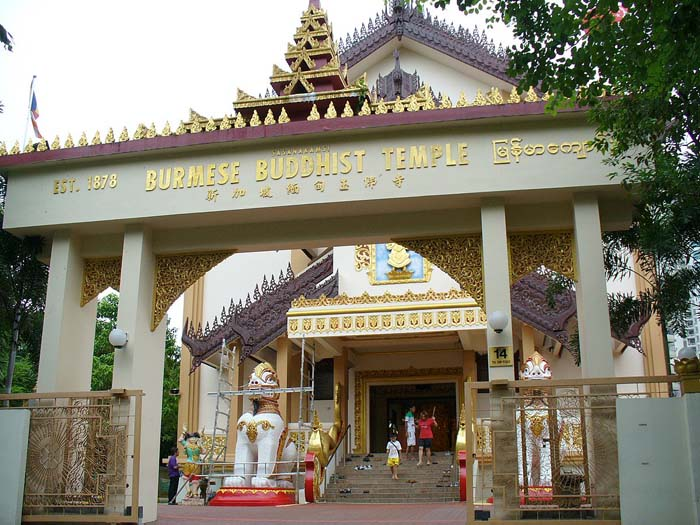
Burmese Buddhist Temple-Singapore

The Burmese Buddhist Temple in Singapore is Singapore's oldest Theravada institution founded in 1875 by a Burmese emigrant. The 10-tonne Buddha image within the temple was transported from Mandalay in 1921 Today, it remains the only Burmese Buddhist temple built in the traditional Burmese style and serves as a landmark for many Burmese immigrants in Singapore.

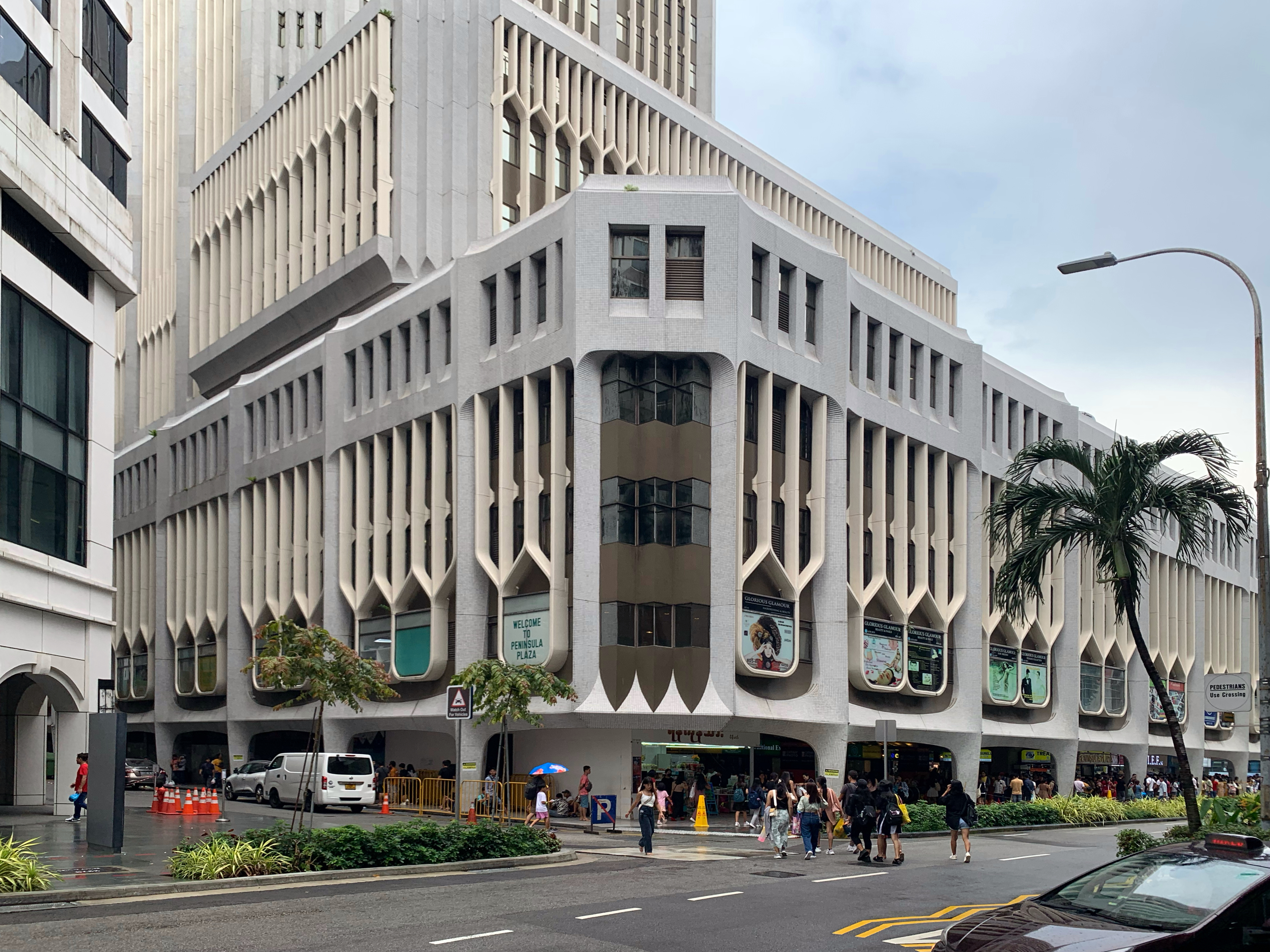
Peninsula Plaza, Singapore

Peninsula Plaza, located close to Singapore's former City Hall is home to a Burmese enclave with traditional wear, Burmese restaurants and stores located inside the plaza's mall. The area was once home to Tan Kim Ching and the Peninsula Plaza was built in 1979 and was designed to preserve the sea view from Fort Canning. It eventually became a hub for the local Myanmar community in the 1990s with early businesses and a Burmese-language library opening in the Plaza.

In 2015, Singapore sent delegates from its National Heritage Board to collaborate with Myanmar's Ministry of Culture to learn about archaeological practices and heritage management in Myanmar, with a follow-up conservation workshop in 2017 at the Heritage Conservation Center in Singapore. There is also cross-cultural exchange in the form of Myanmar citizens as academics based in Singapore, including historian Maitrii Aung-Thwin and law professor Dr. Myint Soe.

Myanmar nationals in Singapore often work as maids, who are cheaper than their counterparts mainly because they typically lack full knowledge of the English language. These Burmese maids form their own communities, including four Chin language Christian Churches within Singapore.

== Diplomatic missions ==
The Myanmar embassy in Singapore is located in Tanglin, Singapore.

The Singaporean embassy in Myanmar is located in Bahan Township, Yangon. The current ambassador of Singapore in Myanmar is Vanessa Chan serving since 2017. Before the embassy building was established in 1993, the Singaporean delegation worked out of Inya Lake Hotel. The current ambassador of Myanmar in Singapore is Tin Oo Lwin.
