= Micheal Henry =

Nigerian footballer (born 1991)

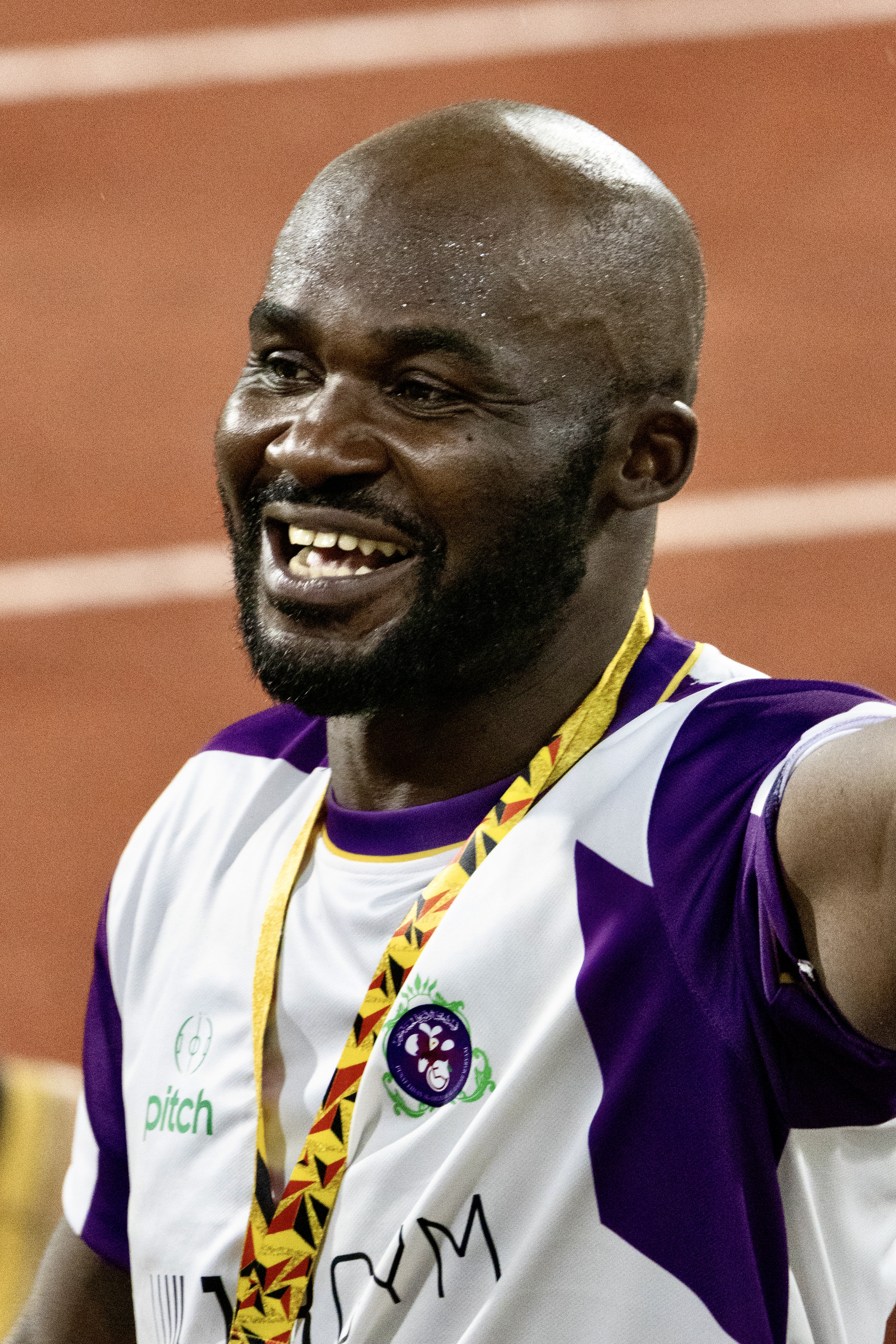
- Henry in 2024

Personal information
- Full name: Micheal Henry Alloysius
- Date of birth: 31 January 1991 (age 35)
- Place of birth: Onitsha, Nigeria
- Height: 1.85 m (6 ft 1 in)
- Position: Center-back

Youth career
- 2008–2009: Babanawa FC
- 2009–2010: Eko United FC

Senior career*
Years	Team	Apps	(Gls)
2010–2011	FC Rapid Ghidighici		
2012–2014	Sitra Club		
2015–2017	Magwe		
2018–2019	Hanthawaddy United	44	(4)
2020–2023	Indera	10	(3)
- * Club domestic league appearances and goals as of 5 September 2024

Micheal Henry Alloysius (born 31 January 1991), also known as Micheal Falcon, is a Nigerian former footballer who played as a defender.

== Career ==
Henry started his career in Moldova for FC Rapid Ghidighici, then for Sitra Club in Bahrain, playing in their first division for the 2013–14 season. He transferred to Magwe F.C. in the 2015 Myanmar National League season, finishing third in the league table.

Then sometimes known as Micheal Falcon, Henry once again excelled in the 2016 season, repeating Magwe's league position in the previous year. He won the General Aung San Shield of that year, scoring the equalising goal in the 2–1 victory against Yangon United in the shield final. This enabled Henry's club to participate in the 2017 AFC Cup, meeting Malaysian giants and former AFC Cup winners Johor Darul Ta'zim in the group stages.

Henry moved to Hantharwady United at the start of the 2018 season, scoring on his debut in a 2–1 loss to Yangon United. He was ever-present in two seasons with the club, before transferring to Bruneian outfit Indera SC along with fellow Nigerians Emmanuel Samson and Kingsley Nkurumeh in early 2020. Henry stayed in Brunei even after the cancellation of the 2020 season of the Brunei Super League and signed for another year.

Henry scored his first goal for Indera in a 10–0 victory over Rimba Star FC on 27 June 2021.

== Honours ==
Magwe

- General Aung San Shield: 2016

Indera

- Brunei Super League: 2023 (runner-up)

== Personal life ==
Henry converted to Islam in January 2022 and took the Islamic name Muhammad Mikhail. He married a Bruneian local later in the year.

Henry scored a goal at the Pusat Ehsan Charity Football Match for the side that featured Prince Abdul Muntaqim of Brunei on 28 June 2024.

Henry is currently a grassroots football coach based in Brunei.
