= 2016 General Aung San Shield final =

- Event: General Aung San Shield
Yangon United	Magwe
1	2
- Report
- Date: 17 August 2016
- Venue: Bogyoke Aung San Stadium, Yangon
- Man of the Match: (Guinea) Sylla
- Referee: (Laos) Mr.Xaypaseuth Phonsanit
- Attendance: 11,000
- Weather: Partly cloudy 28 °C (82 °F)

The 2016 General Aung San Shield final is the 6th final of the MFF Cup. The General Aung San Shield winner will qualify to AFC Cup competition. The match was contested by Yangon United and Magwe at Bogyoke Aung San Stadium in Yangon. The match was played on 17 August 2016 and was the final match of the Bogyoke Aung San Cup.

== Background ==
Yangon United were playing a record 2nd MFF Cup final. They had previously won against Nay Pyi Taw in 2011 MFF Cup final.

It is Magwe's first time ever MFF Cup final.

== Ticket allocation ==
Both Yangon United FC and Magwe FC received a ticket allocation of 10,000 for the game. Ticket price are 1,000 MMK (Normal Ticket) and 2,000MMK (Special Ticket).

== Route to the Final ==
=== Yangon United ===
Round	Opposition	Score
2nd	Mahar United FC	1–0
QF	Hanthawaddy United	3-0
SF	Yadanarbon	1–1/2-1 (h/a)
Key: (h) = Home venue; (a) = Away venue; (n) = Neutral venue.

Yanon United entered the competition in the Second Round as a Myanmar National League club. In their first match, Yangon United met MNL-2 new club, Mahar United. Yangon United player, Than Paing scored only goal. And Second match, Yangon defeated 3–0 against Hanthawaddy United. In Semi-final, Yangon United met their derby club Yadanarbon. Yangon United drew 1–1 in their home stadium and won 2–1 at Bahtoo Stadium.

=== Magwe ===
Round	Opposition	Score
2nd	Chin United FC	2-1
QF	Shan United	1-0
SF	Zwekapin United	2–0/1-2 (h/a)
Key: (h) = Home venue; (a) = Away venue; (n) = Neutral venue.

Also MNL club, Magwe won 2–1 against Chin United in their first match. And then, Magwe met with Biggest team Shan United and won 1–0. In Semi-final, Magwe defeated Zwekapin United won 2–0 at Home and 1–2 at Away. Then, they reached their first ever General Aung San Shield final.

== Match ==
=== Details ===
17 August 2016
16:00 MST

Yangon United	1 - 2	Magwe
Zaw Min Tun 40'		Micheal 69'; Sylla 75'

Bogyoke Aung San Stadium, Yangon
Attendance: 11,000
Referee: (Laos) Mr.Xaypaseuth Phonsanit

Yangon United	Magwe FC

GK	1	(Brazil) Luiz Fernando
RB	2	(Myanmar) Zarni Htet	(substituted off) 9'
CB	3	(Myanmar) Zaw Min Tun
CB	5	(Japan) Kunihiro Yamashita
LB	17	(Myanmar) Khin Maung Lwin (c)
CM	19	(Myanmar) Yan Lin Aung	(substituted off) 56'
CM	25	(Myanmar) Yan Aung Kyaw
RW	4	(Myanmar) David Htan
LW	21	(Myanmar) Zon Moe Aung
CF	8	(Brazil) Marcelo Fernandes
CF	7	(Myanmar) Kyaw Ko Ko
Substitutes:
GK	33	(Myanmar) Wai Lin Aung
FW	9	(Myanmar) Than Paing	(substituted on) 56'	(substituted off) 78'
DF	13	(Myanmar) Thein Zaw	(substituted on) 9'
MF	15	(Myanmar) Swan Htet Aung
FW	20	(Brazil) Adilson
DF	23	(Myanmar) Pyae Phyo Aung
MF	23	(Myanmar) Minn Kyaw Khant	(substituted on) 78'
Manager:
(Myanmar) Myo Min Tun

GK	18	(Myanmar) Kyaw Zin Phyo
RB	12	(Myanmar) Kyaw Zin Lwin	(yellow card) 38'
CB	20	(Nigeria) Michael Falcon
CB	30	(Cameroon) Ronald Djam (c)
LB	5	(Myanmar) Nanda Kyaw
LM	9	(Myanmar) Than Zaw Hein		(substituted off) 46'
CM	23	(Myanmar) Hein Zar Aung		(substituted off) 58'
CM	4	(Myanmar) Set Phyo Wai		(substituted off) 87'
RM	7	(Myanmar) Htoo Htoo Aung
CF	8	(Myanmar) Soe Min Naing
CF	15	(Guinea) Sylla Sekou
Substitutes:
GK	1	(Myanmar) Ye Phyoe Aung
DF	3	(Myanmar) Naing Lin Tun
DM	6	(Myanmar) Nay Min Tun
FW	10	(Myanmar) Maung Maung Soe		(substituted on) 46'
FW	16	(Myanmar) Thant Zin Win		(substituted on) 58'
MF	17	(Myanmar) Aung Show Thar Maung		(substituted on) 87'
MF	19	(Myanmar) Naing Naing Kyaw
Manager:
(Myanmar) Kyi Lwin

Man of the match

- (Guinea) Sylla

Match officials

- Assistant referees:
  - (Myanmar) Mr Aung Moe
  - (Myanmar) Mr Chit Moe Aye
- Fourth official: (Myanmar) Mr Win Htut
- Reserve official: (Myanmar) Mr Hmue Kyaing
- Match Commissioner: (Myanmar) Mr Tun Tun Aung

Match rules

- 90 minutes.
- 30 minutes of extra-time if necessary.
- Penalty shoot-out if scores still level.
- Seven named substitutes.
- Maximum of three substitutions.

=== Statistics ===
Statistic	Yangon United	Magwe FC
Goals scored	1	2
Possession	55	45
Shots on target	4	4
Shots off target	3	2
Corner kicks	2	2
Fouls	2	1
Offsides		
Yellow cards	0	1
Red cards		

== Broadcasting rights ==
These matches will be broadcast live on Myanmar television:

Round	MWD
Final	Yangon United v Magwe FC
