= Sithu Win =

Sithu Win may refer to:

- Sithu Win (footballer)
- Sithu Win (actor)
