= Jean-Paul Hinako Oulaï =

Footballer (born 1990)

Jean-Paul Oulaï
Personal information
- Full name: Jean-Paul Hinako Oulaï
- Date of birth: 19 September 1990 (age 36)
- Place of birth: Abidjan, Ivory Coast
- Height: 1.78 m (5 ft 10 in)
- Position: Defender

Senior career*
Years	Team	Apps	(Gls)
?–2015	AS Real Bamako		
2016	Inter Pattaya		
2016	Bangkok Christian College F.C.		(1)
2017	Magwe F.C.		

International career
2015	Mali	1	(0)
- * Club domestic league appearances and goals

Jean-Paul Hinako Oulaï (born 19 September 1990) is a former professional footballer who played as a defender. Born in Ivory Coast, he made one appearance for the Mali national team.

== Career ==
Oulaï was born in Abidjan, Ivory Coast.

=== Thailand ===
Completed a move to Inter Pattaya, then of the Thai League 3, in 2016.

=== Myanmar ===
Arriving at Magwe of the Myanmar National League in January 2017, Oulaï helped them secure the preseason 2016 MFF Charity Cup, the 6th iteration of the competition.
