= Adama Koné =

Ivorian footballer

Personal information
- Date of birth: 4 April 1987 (age 39)
- Place of birth: Djebonoua, Ivory Coast
- Height: 1.85 m (6 ft 1 in)
- Position: Forward

Team information
- Current team: Yangon United
- Number: 45

Senior career*
| Years | Team | Apps | (Gls) |
| –2013 | Yadanarbon | | |
| 2013– | Yangon United | | |
- * Club domestic league appearances and goals

Adama Koné (born 4 April 1987) is an Ivory Coast professional footballer who plays as a forward for Yangon United F.C. in the Myanmar National League. Before coming to Myanmar, he spent time in clubs in Israel, Egypt, and Thailand.

== Career ==
=== Early career ===
Aged 12, Koné began his career in a football academy in Ivory Coast. After graduating, he departed to ply his trade overseas.

=== Yangon United ===
At the start of 2013, the Ivorian arrived in Myanmar to play because he viewed playing in Thailand as monotonous.

Koné made his debut in the AFC Cup with Burmese side Yangon United F.C. on 26 February 2013 against Indonesian Premier League side Persibo Bojonegoro in which he started and scored all three goals for his side in the 56th, 63rd, and 92nd minutes as Yangon United won 3–0. He then scored his fourth goal in two games in the very next match against Hong Kong First Division side Sun Hei SC in which he found the net in the 2nd minute as Yangon United won 3–1. He then continued his form in the AFC Cup on 3 April 2013 against Maldivian side New Radiant SC in which he scored in the 17th minute to lead Yangon United to a 2–0 victory. He then made it 4 for 4 when he scored yet again in Yangon United's 3–1 return loss to New Radiant on 9 April 2013.

Koné then scored in his fifth consecutive match in the AFC Cup on 24 April 2013 against Persibo in which he scored a brace in the 28th and 85th minutes of the match as Yangon United defeated Persibo 7–1. The Ivorian credited the success to his teammates, who set him up for scoring opportunities.

== Honours ==
=== Clubs ===
Samutsakhon fc Thai division 2 league 2015 Nakhonnayok fc Thai division 2 league 2014

Yangon United

- Myanmar National League (1): 2013

Yadanarbon fc Myanmar national league 2012 Phuket fc Thai division 1 league 2011 Sisaket fc Thai premier league 2010 Ttm phichit Thai premiere ligue 2010 Muangthong united Thai premiere league 2009
