= Tércio Machado =

Brazilian footballer

Personal information
- Full name: Tércio Nunes Machado
- Date of birth: 9 January 1978 (age 48)
- Place of birth: Coromandel, Minas Gerais, Brazil
- Height: 1.80 m (5 ft 11 in)
- Position: Midfielder

Senior career*
Years	Team	Apps	(Gls)
1997–1998	Atlético Mineiro		
1999	Caxias		
1999	Cruzeiro		
2000	Náutico		
2001–2003	Atlético Mineiro		
2004–2007	Ceilândia		
2008	KL Plus FC		
2008–2009	Feirense		
2010–2011	Araxá		
2012	Kanbawza		
- * Club domestic league appearances and goals

Tércio Nunes Machado (born 9 January 1978) is a Brazilian former association football player.

== Club career ==
As a midfielder, Tércio Nunes Machado played for several clubs including Atlético Mineiro, Caxias, Cruzeiro, Náutico and Ceilândia in Brazil before heading overseas.

He had a season with KL Plus FC in Malaysia before played for Feirense in Portugal and for Araxá in Brazil.

In December 2011, he returned to Malaysia and signed with Malaysia Super League side Terengganu FA, which will play in the 2012 AFC Cup. However, he later failed to register in the league after failing meeting the Football Association of Malaysia rules and requirements.

He left Malaysia and joined the Myanmar side, Kanbawza FC.
