= Naumov =

Naumov (Bulgarian and Russian: Наумов) is a Bulgarian and Russian surname derived from the personal name Naum.

- Aleksandr Naumov (1868–1950), Russian Minister of Agriculture
- Alexander Naumov (1935–2010), Soviet and Russian painter
- Aleksey Naumov (footballer) (born 1972), Russian professional footballer
- Andriy Naumov (born 1973), Ukrainian athlete
- Hristo Shopov (born 1964), Bulgarian actor
- Ivan Naumov (1870–1907), Bulgarian revolutionary
- Lev Naumov (1925–2005), Russian classical pianist, composer and educator
- Marija Naumova (born 1973), Latvian singer
- Maryana Naumova (born 1999), Russian powerlifter
- Maxim Naumov (figure skater) (born 2001), American figure skater
- Nikolai Naumov (1838–1901), Russian writer
- Radomir Naumov (1946–2015), Serbian politician
- Riste Naumov (born 1981), Macedonian professional footballer
- Sergejs Naumovs (born 1969), Latvian professional ice hockey goaltender
- Stanislav Naumov (born 1972), Russian politician
- Vadim Naumov (1969–2025), Russian 1994 World champion pair skater
- Vladimir Naumov (1927–2021), Russian film director and writer
- Yuri Naumov (born 1962), Russian born poet, composer, singer and acoustic guitar player
