= Myitsone Dam =

Suspended Myanmar hydroelectric dam proposal

- Artist's conception, Myitsone Dam

- Location within Myanmar
- Official name: မြစ်ဆုံ တာတမံ(မြစ်ဆုံ ရေကာတာ)
- Location: Kachin, Myanmar
- Coordinates: 25°41′23″N 97°31′4″E
- Construction began: 2009
- Opening date: Unknown
- Construction cost: US$3.6 billion
- Owners: The Ministry of Electric Power No.1 of Myanmar, China Power Investment Corporation, Asia World Company Limited

Dam and spillways
- Type of dam: Concrete faced rock-fill dam
- Impounds: Irawaddy River (Ayeyawady River)
- Height: 139.6 m (458 ft)
- Length: 1,310 m (4,300 ft)

Reservoir
- Creates: Myitsone reservoir
- Total capacity: 13.282 billion m^{3}
- Surface area: 447 km^{2} (173 sq mi)
- Maximum water depth: 121 m (397 ft)

Power Station
- Installed capacity: 6,000 MW (8,000,000 hp)
- Annual generation: 30.86 billion kWh

The Myitsone Dam (Burmese: မြစ်ဆုံ တာတမံ [mjɪʔsʰòʊɰ̃ tàtəmàɰ̃]; lit. 'Confluence Dam') is a large dam and hydroelectric power development project which was planned to be built in northern Myanmar. The proposed construction site is at the confluence of the Mali and N’mai rivers and the source of the Irawaddy River (Ayeyawady River). As of 2017 the project is suspended, but China has been lobbying for its revival.

Had the dam been completed according to plans in 2017 it would have been the fifteenth largest hydroelectric power station in the world. The dam, planned to be 1,310 metres (4,300 ft) long and 139.6 metres (458 ft) high, was to be built by the Upstream Ayeyawady Confluence Basin Hydropower Company. The company is a joint venture of the China Power Investment Corporation (CPI), the Burmese Government's Ministry of Electric Power, and the Asia World Company. The dam was planned to have a generation capacity of 6,000 megawatts and to produce electricity primarily for export to Yunnan, China. CPI contended that China would not be the electricity's primary market and stated that Myanmar would have first claim on the electricity generated, with the remainder or surplus sold for export. Opponents remained skeptical because most Burmese are not connected to the electrical grid, and doubted whether the dam would improve their livelihood.

The dam project has been controversial in Burma due to its enormous flooded area, environmental impacts, location 60 miles from the Sagaing faultline, and uneven share of electricity output between the two countries. The Burmese public regards the Irrawaddy River as the birthplace of Burmese civilization. Although access to the Chinese market guarantees the dam's electricity sales, for many Burmese the Myitsone Dam represents growing Chinese influence in Burma which they perceive as "exploitative" to the country hitherto isolated by Western economic sanctions. Even government officials have differing opinions on the project.

On 30 September 2011, amid democratic reforms in the country, President Thein Sein announced that the Myitsone Dam project was to be suspended during his tenure. Because the government appeared to have taken public opinion into account, the unexpected decision was seen as a reversal of the authoritarian rule since the coup in 1962.

== Location ==
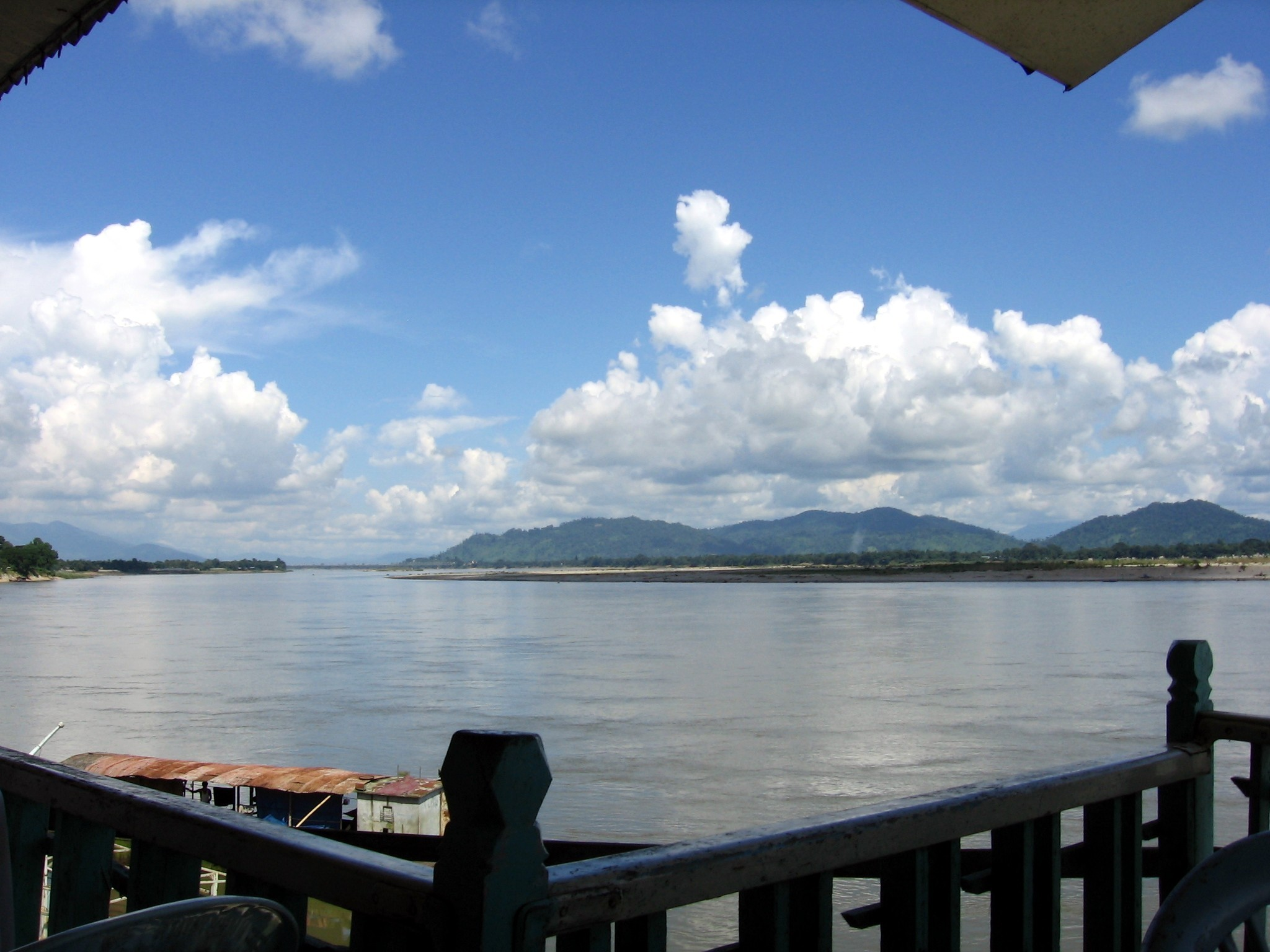
Irawaddy River below the dam site at Myitkyina

The Burmese-language name Myitsone (မြစ်ဆုံ) refers to the river confluence where the Mali and N’Mai rivers merge; in the Jinghpaw (Kachin) language, the confluence is known as Mali N’Mai Zup (also rendered Mali Zup).

The dam site is 3.2 kilometres (2.0 mi) below the confluence of the Mali River and the N'Mai River about 42 km (26 mi) north of Myitkyina, the capital of Kachin State, in northern Burma. The source of both the N'mai and Mali rivers is the Himalaya glaciers of northern Burma in the vicinity of 28° N. The easternmost of the two, N'mai river, is the larger stream and rises in the Languela Glacier north of Putao. It is not navigable due to its strong current, whereas the smaller western river, the Mali, is navigable, despite a few rapids.

The project site is in the politically unstable Kachin State. Since 1962, the Kachin Independence Army (KIA) has been waging war against Burmese military. Despite a ceasefire in 1994, clashes and bomb explosions occasionally occur near the dam site. In 2011, clashes between Burmese military and KIA intensified and the Burmese military ordered airstrikes in northern Kachin State.

== History ==
The Myitsone Dam is part of the Confluence Region Hydropower Project (CRHP), which includes seven dams with a total installed capacity of 20,000 MW. CRHP alone accounts for 41% of the total power capacity called for by a 30-year strategic plan. Outlined in 2001, the plan includes 64 hydropower plants and three coal power plants with combined installed capacity of more than 40,000 megawatts (54,000,000 hp).

The Myanmar Electrical Power Enterprise and the Agriculture and Irrigation Ministry scheduled the Irawaddy Myitsone Dam Multipurpose Water Utilization Project in 2001. The survey phase was initiated in 2003. First the government contracted the Japanese Kansai Electric Power Company to build a small weather station at Tang Hpre village, near the confluence. Chinese and Burmese contractors, including Yunnan Machinery Equipment Import & Export Company (YMEC), Kunming Hydropower Institute of Design, surveyed the dam site. In 2006, Suntac Technologies Co. Ltd., a Burmese geographic information system (GIS) mapping contractor set up an office at the monastery in Tang Hpre village. They also set up a temporary camp at Washawng village to facilitate transport of survey equipment from the YMEC company in China. In October, the Asia World Company built a project implementation camp on a hilltop at the dam site 3 miles (4.8 km) downstream from the confluence. When the camp was complete, Chinese technicians stayed and surveyed the area for five months. In December 2006, the Ministry of Electric Power No. 1 and the China Power Investment Corporation signed a memorandum of understanding (MOU) for a 6,000 megawatts (8,000,000 hp) project at Myitsone and a 3,400 megawatts (4,600,000 hp) project at Chibwe.

The design phase began in 2007. The Changjiang Design Institute of China sent several groups of design personnel and conducted geological drilling, reservoir inspection, and hydrological measuring near the dam site. To supply electricity for dam construction projects, the small 99 megawatts (133,000 hp), Chibwe Nge hydropower project was built in April 2007. In May, the New Light of Myanmar reported that the Ministry of Power No. 1 and CPI would build seven hydropower dams on the N'Mai and Irawaddy rivers.

On 16 June 2009, Myanmar Ambassador Thein Lwin and President of China Power Investment Corporation Lu Qizhou signed a memorandum of agreement between the Department of Hydropower Implementation and the China Power Investment Corporation for the development, operation, and transfer of the hydropower projects in N'Mai Hka, Mali Hka and upstream of Irrawaddy-Myitsone River basins.

In late-2009, a team of 80 Burmese and Chinese scientists and environmentalists published a 945 page environmental impact study of the Myitsone Dam for China Power Investment. It concluded that the dam should never be built. The Burma Rivers Network, which opposes the dam, obtained a copy of the report and made it public. The Ministry of Electric Power-1 responded that it had done its own environmental assessment and that the dam would be built regardless. The official opening ceremony of the dam construction phase was held on 21 December.

== Economics ==
The majority of the total US$3.6 billion construction cost was to be covered by the China Power Investment Corporation in a joint venture with the Ministry of Electric Power No. 1 of Myanmar and the Asia World Company. The Burmese government would get 10% of the electricity generated and 15% of the project shares for land use. In addition, the government would charge a withholding tax and an export tax on electricity exported to China. After a fifty year period, the government would totally own the project. The Burmese government would earn about US$54 billion via tax payments, power and shares, accounting for 60% of the total revenue of the Irrawaddy projects during the contracted 50 years, more than CPI's return on investment during the fifty years Chinese operation period according to the president of CPI. However, the government economic calculations have been criticized for not considering potential environmental and societal impacts.

== Design ==
Computerised drawing of Myitsone

The dam was planned to be a concrete faced rock-fill dam 139.6 metres (458 ft) high and 1,310 metres (4,300 ft) long, and projected to produce 6,000 MW of electricity by 2017. This is equivalent to 27% of the 22,500 megawatts (30,200,000 hp) output of the Three Gorges Dam In China, the world's largest electricity-generating plant of any kind.

Minister of Electric Power Zaw Min claimed that the dam was designed to withstand an earthquake of 8.0 Richter Scale, a scale that has never been recorded to have occurred in that region, and the most devastating flood of a millennium.

== Power generation ==
The Myitsone Dam is the largest of the seven large dams currently planned on the Mali, N'Mai, and Irawaddy Rivers. The China Power Investment Corporation is project manager of the Confluence Region Hydropower Projects. The seven dams combined total design installed capacity is 20,000 MW of electricity.

The dam is to provide electricity primarily to the China Southern Power Grid via its subsidiary, the Yunnan Power Grid Company, in Yunnan Province and then on to the power hungry eastern coastal areas of China, in conformity with the Chinese central government's "West to East Transmission Policy". The hydropower project was being implemented under an agreement signed in late-2006 with the state-owned China Power Investment Corporation and Burma's Ministry of Electric Power No 1. The dam and reservoir planning and construction is managed by the Burmese government in cooperation with the China Southern Power Grid and several subcontractors.

The dam would also supply 10% of its generated electricity to the Myanmar power grid if needed. The Chipwi Nge Hydropower Project, which was installed to provide electricity for construction projects, began supplying electricity to Myitkyina, Chipwi, and the Myitsone Resettlement Village. However, few villagers have electrical devices. "We don't need to buy candles, this is the only useful thing" a villager said. They would prefer to have their productive land back.

== Social impact ==
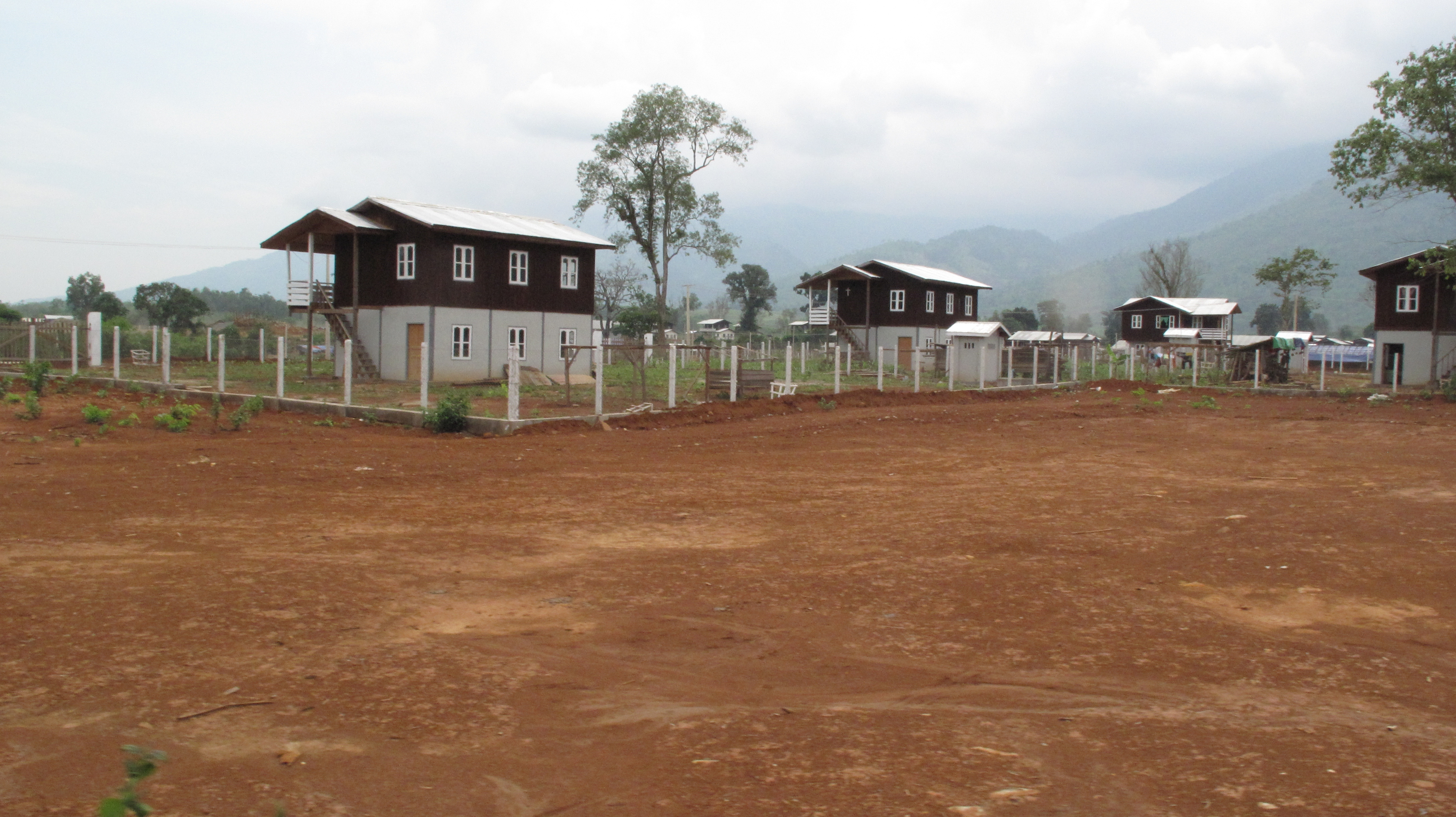
One of the relocated villages

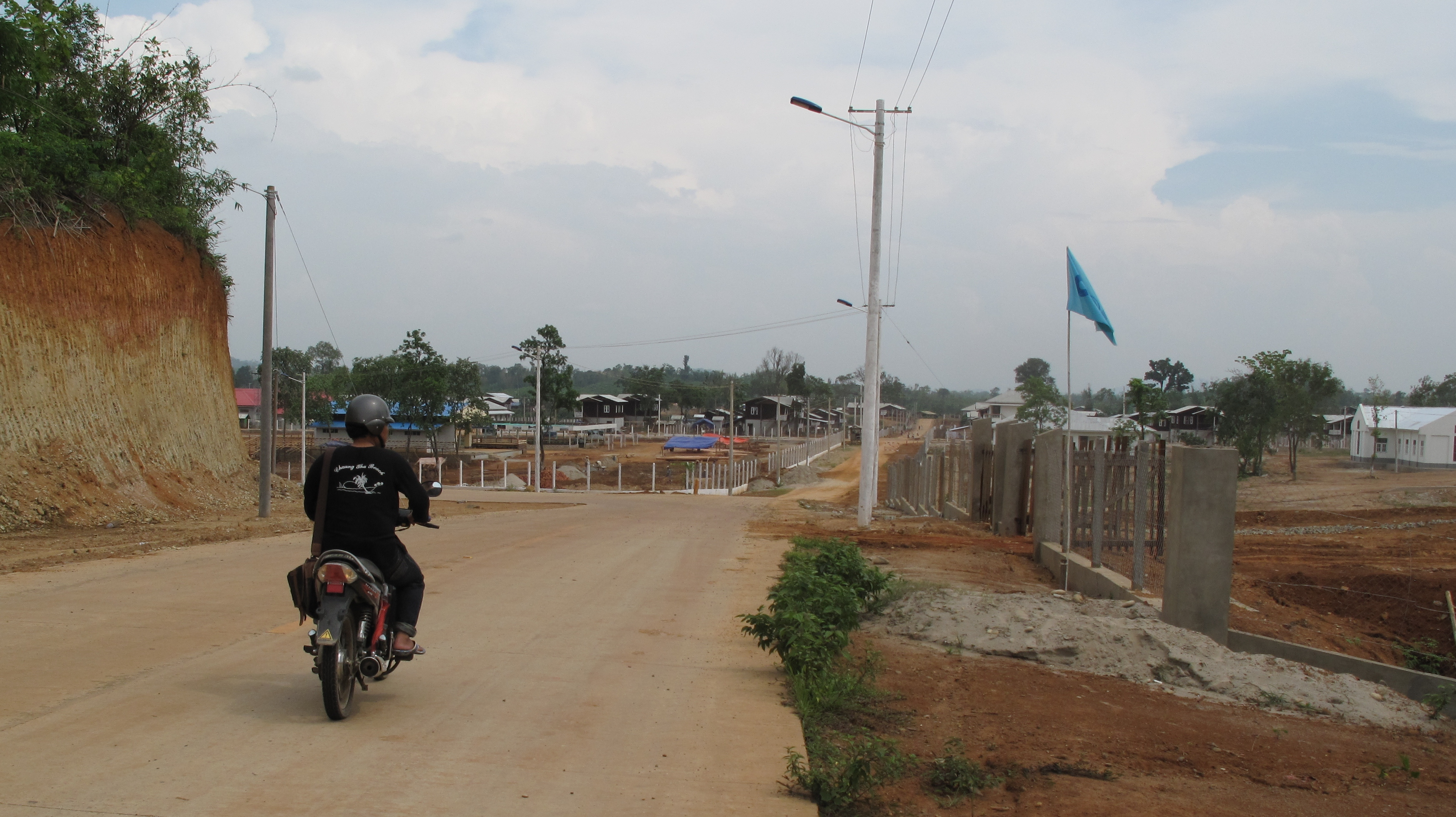
Tang Hpre village, after relocation, supplied with electricity and new concrete roads.

The dam is expected to flood 447 square kilometres (173 sq mi) including 47 villages near the construction site and about 11,800 local people would be relocated in the newly built resettlement villages. The activists in exile stated that the dam would submerge historical temples, churches, and cultural heritage sites important to Kachin identity and history and the natural heritage of the Kachin people in Myitsone area would be lost.

In response, the government reported in the state-run newspaper, New Light of Myanmar, that relocated villages from the project area had been provided with all forms of aids including water, electric power, and buildings and that the government also helped in relocation of religious buildings. CPI reported a total expense of 4.1 billion kyats in compensation and US$25 million in resettlement funding. The government stated that the remote region would benefit greatly from the new roads and access to electricity.

Local communities pointed out other issues such as the dam's location on earthquake-prone zone. They opposed the dam site because it is less than 100 kilometres (62 mi) from the major Sagaing fault line, posing a risk to basin inhabitants if an earthquake weakened the dam or caused landslides in the reservoir. If the Irrawaddy Myitsone Dam broke during an earthquake, it would endanger the lives of hundred of thousands of people downstream in Kachin State's largest city, Myikyina.

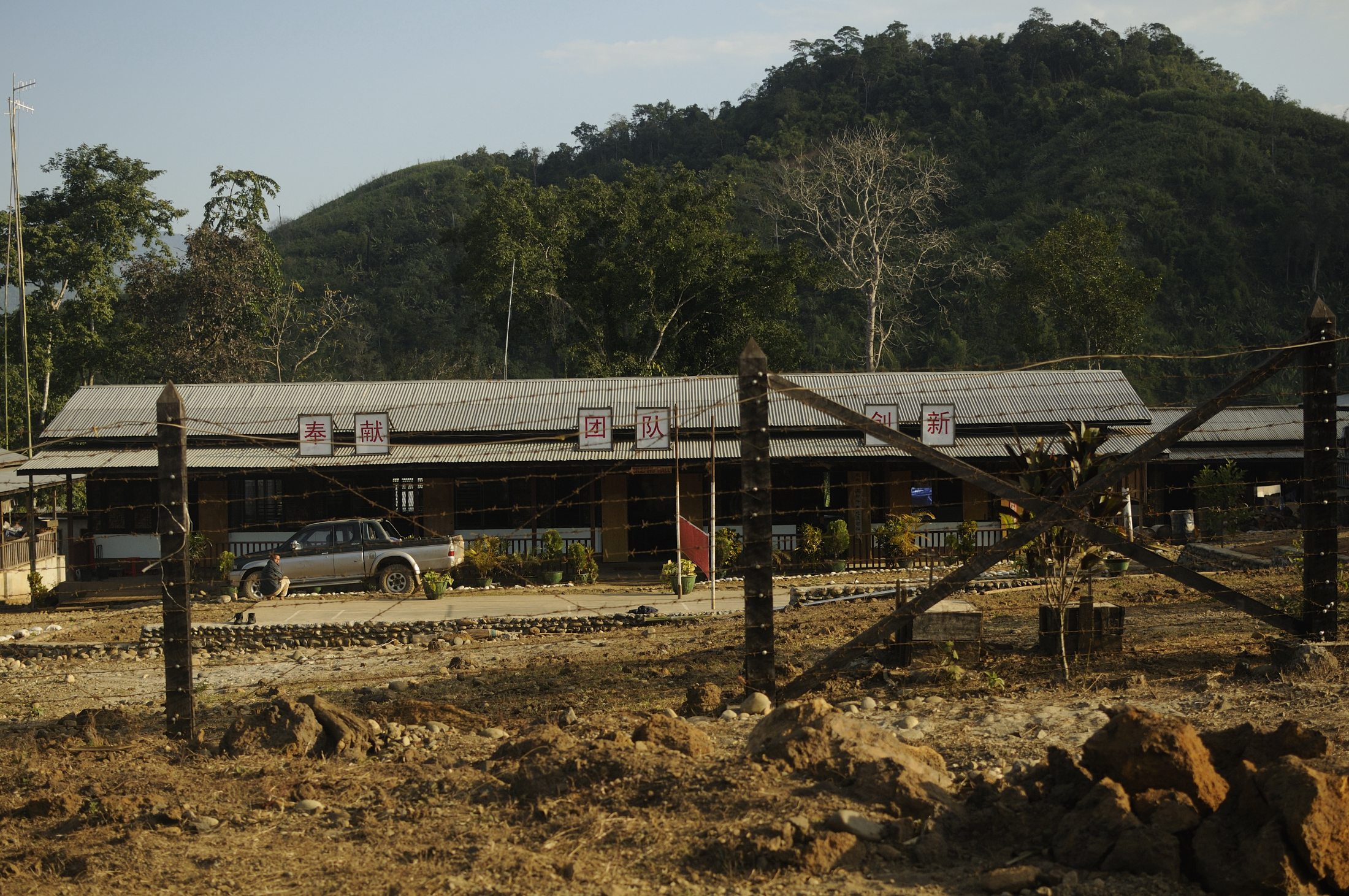
Myitsone Dam Chinese Construction worker barracks

In response, the government said that the dam would withstand an earthquake of magnitude 8.0 on the Richter scale. In an interview with Xinhua News, Lu Qizhou, President of China Power Investment Corporation said that Myitsone Hydropower Station follows the standard of fortification intensity 9, two points above the intensity of Zipingbu Hydropower Station that withstood 2008 Sichuan earthquake of 8.0 Richter scale. On the other hand, Burmese scientists who carried out the environmental assessment recommended building two smaller dams farther upstream instead of building in an earthquake-prone zone.

A social benefit of the project pointed out by its proponents is that the construction and the maintenance of the dam would employ a large number of people.

== Environmental impact ==
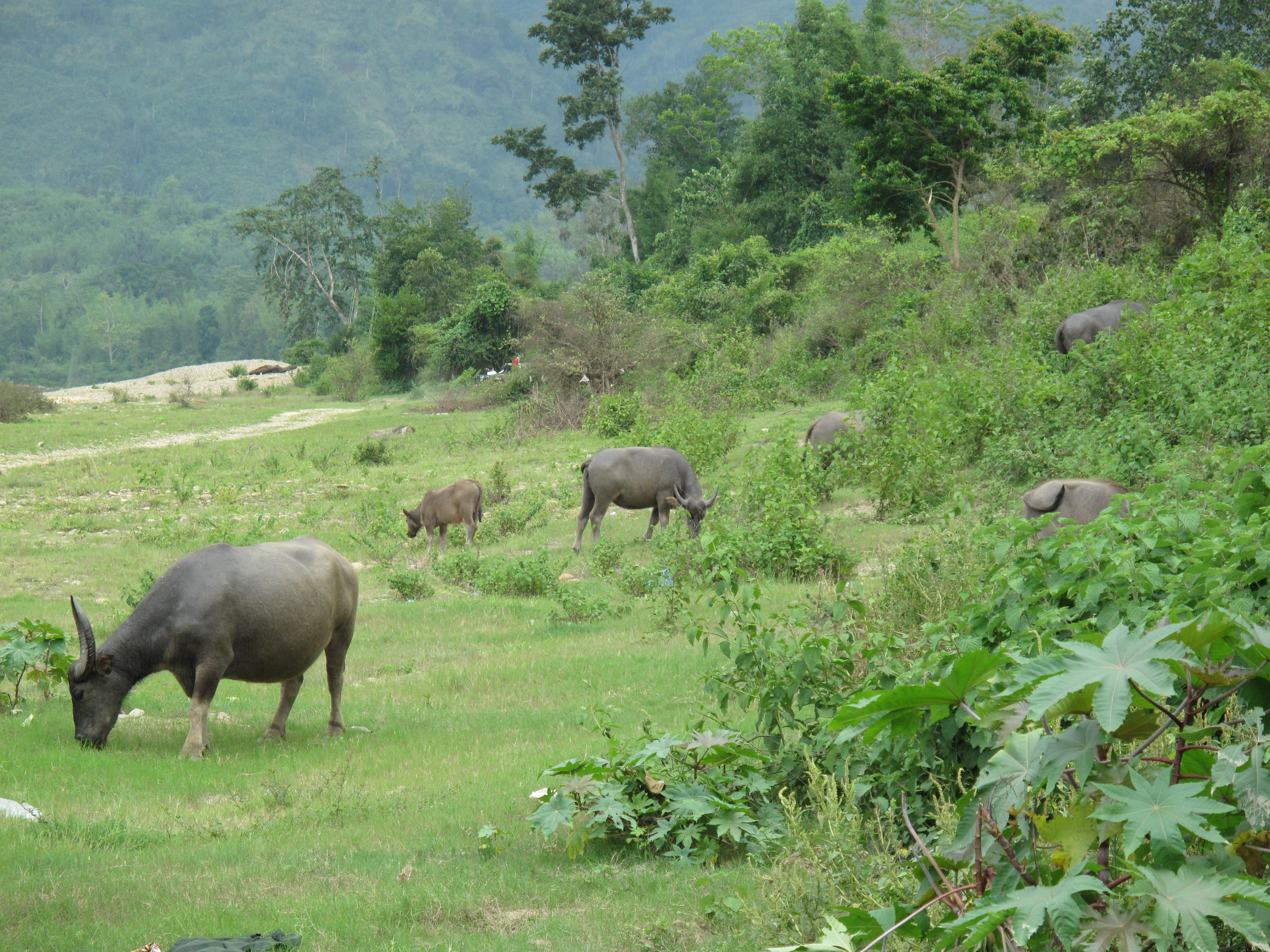
Livestock near the project area. The area is expected to flood after the dam completion

As with other large dam projects, the Myitsone Dam construction would alter the hydrological characteristics of the river and prevent sediment from enriching the historically highly productive agricultural floodplains downstream. This can affect fertility as far downstream as the Irrawaddy Delta, the major rice producing area of Myanmar. The government responded that officials had taken sediment accumulation into consideration, and that the Myitsone Dam would discharge accumulated sediment.

Other consequences of flooding the reservoir include loss of farmland and loss of spawning habitat as some migratory fish will be able to swim upstream after dam completion. This would lead to lost income for fishermen according to Kachin environmental activist groups in exile. On the other hand, research by Biodiversity And Nature Conservation Association (BANCA) contradicts the activists' statement. BANCA's research asserts that commercial fishing is not reported from the project area. But it confirms that some resident aquatic species will be affected by the change in hydrological conditions.

Ecological concerns focus on the inundation of an area that is the border of the Indo-Burma and South Central China biodiversity hotspot. The Mali and N'mai River confluence region falls within the Mizoram-Manipur-Kachin rainforests. Nevertheless, proponents of the dam argue that it would increase the shipping capacity of Irrawaddy River. The floods, currently an annual occurrence, would only occur once every twenty years. Proponents also emphasize an expected positive environmental effect: since hydropower is renewable and green energy, the energy produced by the dam would decrease the need for polluting sources of energy such as fossil fuels.

== Opposition ==
News reports such as Aung San Suu Kyi's campaign against the Myitsone Dam are not censored

In Burma, the Irrawaddy River, on the bank of which major historic cities such as Bagan were built, is considered as the birthplace of Burmese civilization. For that reason, The Burmese public protests against the dam project, which would inevitably alter hydrological characteristics of the historic river. Moreover, the growing Chinese influence in Burma is seen as exploitative by Burmese people, due to its association with previous military junta.

On the other hand, local villages have opposed the project since its proposal in 2001. According to the environmental organization International Rivers, in 2007, 12 local leaders from Kachin State sent a letter to Senior General Than Shwe and the junta's Ministry of Electric Power, asking for the project to be cancelled. The Burma Rivers Network also sent a letter to the Chinese government asking Chinese companies operating in Burma to conduct environmental and social impact assessments, to release information publicly, and to consider the opinions of affected communities in the decision-making process. In a parliamentary session, government minister Zaw Min responded that an environmental impact study had been carried out by the Biodiversity And Nature Conservation Association (BANCA) at a cost of US$1.25 million and stated that Myitsone Dam Project was started only when the government had studied the possible environmental impacts. However, the results of BANCA's assessment were not disclosed publicly.

Outside Burma, activists in exile have actively carried out protests in various countries. In February 2010, the UK-based Kachin National Organization (KNO) protested against construction of the dam in front of the Burmese Embassies in the UK, Japan, Australia, and the United States. Leaked United States diplomatic cables revealed that the US embassy in Yangon funded some of the activist groups.

Within the country an activist was detained for what local authorities said were unrelated charges. Land rights activist and politician Daw Bauk Ja was arrested for medical negligence in 2013, though the case against her had been withdrawn years earlier.

Skirmishes have been broken out between the Kachin Independence Army and the Burmese military over the dam issue since June 2011. On 17 April 2010, three bombs exploded close to the site of dam, reportedly killing four Chinese workers. The Burmese government blamed the Kachin Independence Army for planting the bombs. KIA has denied having anything to do with the Myitsone bombing.

Domestic campaigns against the project are brought together by political activists including Nobel Peace Prize laureate Aung San Suu Kyi, conservationists, scholars, poets, and journalists. Local media openly criticized the lack of transparency in dam project. Journalists argued that the deal was agreed by previous government without considering public opinions.

Despite the opposition, Minister Zaw Min for the Ministry of Electric Power responded that the government would continue this project up to the completion. In September 2011 he conceded that despite promised benefits from the project, it may be appropriate to minimize the environmental impacts by redesigning the tunnel, lowering the dam's height, and reducing its water storage capacity, and reassessing environmental impacts. He also agreed that final decision should depend on the environmental impact assessment report by the Ministry of Environmental Conservation and Forestry and the study by the Engineer Group.

== Suspension ==
On 30 September 2011, in an address to the parliament, Burma's president Thein Sein announced that the Myitsone Dam project would be halted during the term of his government. The letter from the president consisted of ten points including,

As our government is elected by the people, it is to respect the people’s will. We have the responsibility to address public concerns in all seriousness. So construction of Myitsone Dam will be suspended in the time of our government. Other hydropower projects that pose no threat will be implemented through survey for availability of electricity needed for the nation. I would like to inform the Hluttaws that coordination will be made with the neighbouring friendly nation, the People’s Republic of China, to accept the agreements regarding the project without undermining cordial relations.

— Thein Sein, Letter to parliament

The decision was universally acclaimed by environmentalists, political activists and the locals alike. It is considered as "a rare reversal" in that for the first time, the government had listened to the people in face of public opposition. Western nations including EU and the United States welcomed the President's decision.

In response, Chinese Foreign Ministry spokesman Hong Lei stated that the Chinese government has urged the Burmese government to protect the legal and legitimate rights and interests of Chinese companies. He reminded that the Myitsone Dam is a jointly invested project between China and Myanmar, and one that has been thoroughly examined by both sides. He also confirmed that the matters would be resolved through friendly consultation. The president of CPI, Lu Qizhou, has warned that a halt in construction could lead to legal action.

In October 2011, Myanmar Foreign Minister traveled to Beijing to settle the dispute.

== Aftermath ==
On 2 April 2012, Weekly Eleven news, a private Burmese news journal, broke news of ongoing activities by CPI and Asia World on the Myitsone project site. In April 2012, a leaked government document stated that work on the dam has continued, with work to officially resume within 6 months. The letter is a request for the Kachin State government to provide temporary ID cards for 500 engineers and the tax-free import of 10,000 tons of construction equipment (cement, trucks, bulldozers, excavators). The Kachin State government responded that the letter is a forgery. However, uncertainties exist as Chinese workers remain present in the area.

In March 2012, villagers who had been evicted from the dam work site in 2009 to 2010 and had returned to reclaim their original homes, were forcibly evicted by the Burmese army. The TangHpre villagers demonstrated again when the Chinese Diplomat and Myanmar governance Organization met to restart the Myitsone Dam Project in Palm Spring Hotel on 4 July 2016.

=== Analysis ===
Although the President Thein Sein's decision has been widely applauded, experts caution that Sino-Burma relation could be ultimately harmed by the suspension. Nicholas Farrelly, a Southeast Asia specialist at the Australian National University in Canberra said that while there would inevitably be some short-term damage to bilateral relations, pragmatism would override any potential for long-term animosity. The issue is further exacerbated by the massacre of 13 Chinese sailors near Burma-Thailand border. However, should the project be terminated entirely, the Burmese government would face legal and financial liability associated with the investments and prior agreements.

Internationally, the suspension is considered as one of the democratic reforms along with other engagements such as dialogues with pro-democracy leader Aung San Suu Kyi and release of some political prisoners. Marie Lall, a BBC South Asia analyst attributes Burma's bid for the ASEAN chair in 2014, the needs to reform the economy for ASEAN Free Trade Area and the government's desire to win the election in 2015 as the main motives of the reforms.
