= Kambou =

Kambou is a surname. Notable people with the name include:

- Bèbè Kambou (born 1982), Burkinabé footballer
- Hervé Kambou (born 1985), Ivorian footballer
- Romeo Kambou (born 1980), Burkinabé footballer
- Sarah Degnan Kambou, president of the International Center for Research on Women (ICRW)
