= Lo Hsing Han =

Myanmar businessman and drug trafficker (1935–2013)

- 羅星漢
- Born: 25 September 1935; Kokang, British Raj Burma
- Died: 6 July 2013 (aged 77) (Note: The Irrawaddy Magazine gives 25 September 1935 as his birth date, and if so, he died at the age of 77 (or 78 per traditional Myanma age counting). But the obituary announcement by the family in local newspapers Myanmar Alin and Kyemon mentions that he died at the age of 80.); Yangon, Myanmar
- Other names: Law Sit Han (လော်စစ်ဟန်)
- Occupations: Businessman, drug trafficker
- Known for: Major Southeast Asian drug lord, Entrepreneur of Asia World
- Criminal charge: Drug trafficking (1973)
- Criminal penalty: Death, commuted to life imprisonment
- Criminal status: Commuted (1980)
- Spouse: Zhang Xiaowan (张小菀)
- Children: Steven Law & 7 more
- Family: Lo Hsing-min (brother)

Lo Hsing Han or Law Sit Han (Burmese: လော်စစ်ဟန်, IPA: [lɔ̀ sɪʔ hàɰ̃]; traditional Chinese: 羅星漢; simplified Chinese: 罗星汉; pinyin: Luó Xīnghàn; 25 September 1935 – 6 July 2013) was a Burmese businessman and drug trafficker. He later became a major business tycoon across Burma, with financial ties to Singapore. He was an ethnic Kokang-Chinese. His spouse, Zhang Xiaowen, is a Chinese citizen and native of Gengma County in Yunnan.

== Rise and fall ==
Lo Hsing Han was born poor in the British Raj administration era at Kokang. He reportedly started his opium-trafficking career as chief of a local militia called Ka Kwe Ye (KKY) set up with the encouragement of General Ne Win to fight the Communists. By the early 1970s, he was an important figure in the Asian drug trade, particularly in the trafficking of "China white" heroin. In August 1973, he was arrested in Thailand and handed over to Myanmar. He was sentenced to death for treason on the grounds of his brief association with the insurgent Shan State Army (SSA). He was released in the 1980 during a General Amnesty.

== Comeback ==
When the Kokang and Wa insurgent troops mutinied and toppled the Communist leadership in 1989, military intelligence chief Khin Nyunt found in Lo a useful intermediary in quickly arranging cease-fire agreements and, in return, Lo was given lucrative business opportunities and unofficial permission to run drugs with impunity along with the mutineers. He wasted no time in rebuilding the drug empire he lost 15 years ago to Khun Sa, a rival KKY chief of Loi Maw. No fewer than 17 new heroin refineries were located within a year in Kokang State and adjacent areas.

== Business career ==
In June 1992, he founded the Asia World Company, allegedly as a front for his drug operations. His son, Steven Law (aka Tun Myint Naing), married to Cecilia Ng of Singapore in 1996, runs the company which won many multimillion-dollar contracts in the construction and energy sectors. In the wake of Cyclone Nargis, in February 2008, the US government included Lo, his son, and daughter-in-law, along with the 10 companies they control in Singapore, in its targeted sanctions list of the military junta's business cronies.

According to a report in The Observer, he helped organize and finance the opulent 2006 wedding of the daughter of the Myanmar dictator Than Shwe. A video was leaked onto the internet, showing a well-fed Thandar Shwe, perspiring under the weight of diamond-encrusted necklaces and hairbands and swathed in yards of silk as plump junta members sat on gold-trimmed chairs in front of a five-tiered wedding cake and champagne.

Asia World Company is involved in a number of big projects such as a Sino-Myanmar oil and gas pipeline project, a deep sea port at Kyaukpyu, the controversial Myitsone hydro-power plant and the Tasang hydro-power plant. Companies of the Chinese government have investments in all of them. Steven Law accompanied Thein Sein during his first official foreign visit to China after inauguration as a civilian president.

== Death ==
Lo, heroin king and business tycoon, died on 6 July 2013, in Yangon, Myanmar. He was 80 and is survived by his wife, four sons, four daughters and 16 grandchildren, leaving them behind with a vast sum of wealth. In the secretive world of Myanmar's elite, the extent of Lo's wealth is not known. In an interview, a man often described as the richest person in Myanmar, U Tay Za, said the Lo family surpassed him in wealth.

Lo and his son, Steven Law, were two of the military's most important business partners and were awarded contracts to build roads, provincial seaports and other large infrastructure projects.
