= Dominik Beršnjak =

Slovenian footballer and manager

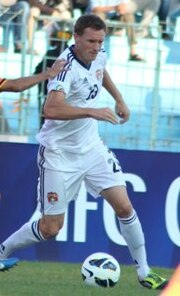
- Beršnjak with Ayeyawady United

Personal information
- Date of birth: 15 July 1981 (age 45)
- Place of birth: Ljubljana, SFR Yugoslavia
- Height: 1.84 m (6 ft 0 in)
- Position: Midfielder

Team information
- Current team: Izola (head coach)

Youth career
- Vransko

Senior career*
Years	Team	Apps	(Gls)
1998–2002	Celje	104	(22)
2003	Genk	0	(0)
2003	Heusden-Zolder	5	(0)
2004	Maribor	18	(4)
2005–2007	Celje	97	(27)
2008–2010	Politehnica Iaşi	51	(5)
2010–2011	Celje	19	(3)
2012	Soproni	4	(1)
2013	Ayeyawady United	22	(7)
2014	SV Wildon	14	(1)
2014–2017	FC Großklein	55	(9)
2020	Vojnik	1	(0)

International career
1998	Slovenia U17	2	(2)
2000–2001	Slovenia U20	5	(2)
2001–2003	Slovenia U21	17	(2)
2006	Slovenia B	2	(1)
2006	Slovenia	1	(0)

Managerial career
- 2018–2019: Brda
- 2020: Rudar Velenje
- 2021–2023: Bilje
- 2024: Botev Plovdiv II
- 2026–: Izola
- * Club domestic league appearances and goals

Dominik Beršnjak (born 15 July 1981) is a Slovenian football manager and former player.

== Club career ==
In January 2008, Beršnjak joined Politehnica Iaşi. After two and a half years, he left the club after they were relegated.

In summer 2010, he signed for his former club Celje.

== International career ==
Beršnjak played one game for the Slovenia national team in 2006.

== Honours ==
Maribor

- Slovenian Cup: 2003–04

Celje

- Slovenian Cup: 2004–05
