= Ka Kwe Ye =

State-sponsored paramilitary in Myanmar

The Ka Kwe Ye (KKY; Burmese: ကာကွယ်ရေး, lit. 'defence') was a Burmese state-sponsored paramilitary organization and criminal syndicate. The organization was founded in 1963 by Khun Sa with the purpose of fighting the communist insurgency and was dedicated to the trafficking of drugs and other illegal merchandise, mainly opium. The KKY was known for its extreme brutality, including kidnappings, the use of torture, and the indiscriminate killing of civilians.

Other non-state actors, such as Kokang, also used Kakweye forces in the 20th century, stylizing the forces as a People's Defence Force. The Kokang tycoon and drug trafficker, Lo Hsing Han, began his career by commanding a KKY force that was set up by Ne Win to fight the Communists in the area.
