= Asia World =

Burmese conglomerate

Asia World Group
- Industry: Construction, Infrastructure, Energy, Manufacturing, Import-Export, Retail
- Founded: 5 June 1992; 34 years ago
- Founder: Lo Hsing Han, Steven Law (Htun Myint Naing)
- Headquarters: Yangon, Myanmar (Burma)
- Key people: Lo Hsing Han, Steven Law (Tun Myint Naing), Cecilia Ng (Ng Sor Hong)
- Divisions: Asia World Company
- Subsidiaries: Asia World Co Ltd., Asia World Port Management, Asia World Industries Ltd., Asia Light, Kokang Singapore Pte Ltd., Golden Aaron Pte Ltd., Pioneer Aerodrome Services Company Ltd., Yangon Aerodrome Company Ltd.
- Website: www.asiaworldcompany.com

Asia World Group (Burmese: အာရှဓန ကုမ္ပဏီ) is a Burmese conglomerate. It is Myanmar's largest and most diversified conglomerate, with interests in industrial development, construction, transportation, import-export, and a local supermarket chain. About half of Singapore's investment in Myanmar (totaling US$1.3 billion in 2000) comes from Asia World affiliates.

== Services ==
Asia World is one of a few private companies in Myanmar that are involved in port management. According to the Myanmar Port Authority (MPA), Asia World's subsidiary Asia World Port had the largest share of country's freight market in the fiscal year 2012–13, handling 45 per cent of goods that passed through Yangon. In addition to freight handling, Asia World Port handles general goods at Myanmar. In August 2011, Asia World was one of four companies to be granted government licences to import and sell fuel in the country.

Asia World's controls includes the following enterprises and businesses:

- Asia Light Supermarket – Lanmadaw Township, Rangoon
- Asia World Industries Limited, Hlaingthaya Industrial Park, Rangoon
- Asia World Thilawa Deep Sea Port
- Hledan Centre Condominium – Rangoon

== Business practices ==
The company's founder, Lo Hsing Han, is an ethnic Kokang Chinese who controlled one of Southeast Asia's largest heroin trafficking armies. Ten more companies in the group are owned in Singapore, under the name of Cecilia Ng (Ng Sor Hong), Steven Law's wife, who US government officials allege operate an underground banking network that helps transport drug money from Burma to Singapore. The company is associated to the United Wa State Army. Asia World is widely believed to have committed money laundering to fund its activities and business expansions.

Six subsidiary companies of Asia World, including Ahlone Wharves, Asia Light, Asia World Company, Asia World Industries, Asia World Port Management, and Leo Express Bus, are currently sanctioned by the British government as part of investment bans in Burma. Since 2008, Asia World and its subsidiaries, including those run in Singapore, have been part of American targeted sanctions.

== Notable projects ==
Asia World paved and widened the Burma Road that links Myanmar to China in 1998. The company has also operated toll booths on Burma Road since 1998. In 2000, Asia World constructed a major road connecting the port city of Pathein to the beach resort of Ngwesaung.

Between 2007 and 2008, Asia World was responsible for a major expansion project at Yangon International Airport. The company, with the technical assistance of Singaporean firm CPG Consultants, was also responsible for developing and constructing Nay Pyi Taw International Airport, which opened on 19 December 2011.

In August 2013, Asia World was granted permission by Myanmar's government to distribute electricity to 37 towns in the Eastern Bago region of the country.

Asia World was one of two major contractors (the other being Htoo Group of Companies) to build the country's new capital at Naypyidaw, including the National Landmark Garden. The company, with the technical assistance of Singaporean firm CPG Consultants, was also responsible for developing and constructing Naypyidaw Airport, which opened on 19 December 2011. Asia World was responsible for a major Yangon International Airport expansion project, including the construction of a new international terminal (opened May 2007) and extension of existing runways (completed July 2008).

The company has also partnered with China Power Investment Corporation to build controversial dams (including the Myitsone Dam) along the Irrawaddy River in Kachin State. In Yangon, the company has stakes in supermarkets, office towers, condominiums and road construction. In 2011, it partnered with the Yangon City Development Committee to upgrade Strand Road. The company is also involved in garment industries, beer production (Tiger Beer), paper mills, palm oil and infrastructure development. Asia World has also operated a port in Yangon's Ahlone Township since 2000

In July 2010, the government granted Asia World control of Yangon International Airport's passenger services operations and management, including collections of departure taxes.
