= Nimês Pina =

Bissau-Guinean footballer (born 1983)

Personal information
- Full name: Nimês Miguel Martins Lopes de Pina
- Date of birth: 4 February 1983 (age 43)
- Place of birth: Guinea-Bissau
- Position: Striker

Senior career*
Years	Team	Apps	(Gls)
2006–2008	Dacia Chisinau	38	(14)
2008	SCM Râmnicu Vâlcea		
2009/10	Othellos Athienou FC	11	(1)
2010	Hibernians F.C.	8	(2)
2011–2012	S.U. Sintrense	23	(5)
- Tires
2013	Zwekapin United FC		
2013	Rakhine United F.C.		
2014	Tilbury F.C.		
2017	AFC Totton		
2017–2018	Blackfield & Langley F.C.		
- * Club domestic league appearances and goals

Nimês Miguel Martins Lopes de Pina (born 4 February 1983) is a Bissau-Guinean footballer who is last known to have been dual-registered with AFC Totton and Blackfield & Langley in England.

== Career ==
=== Moldova ===
Accepting an offer from Dacia Chisinau of the Moldovan National Division. In view of this, he participated in the 2007 UEFA Intertoto Cup.

=== Romania ===
Linked to SCM Râmnicu Vâlcea of the Romanian Liga II in 2008, the Bissau-Guinean was announced in their list for 2008, but was released that December with Slovak Tomáš Labun.

=== Malta ===
Introduced on a short-term contract to Hibernians of the Maltese Premier League in early 2010 through Mawete Júnior, debuting in a 2-4 collapse to Valletta grabbing his first league goal in a 1-0 success over Qormi.

=== Myanmar ===
Phoned by an agent of an injured footballer to come to the Myanmar National League with Zwekapin United in 2013, he swapped them for Rakhapura United that April as their second foreigner on a contract that lasted until the end of August before becoming a free agent.

Based on the experience, Pina stated that he was surprised how the people were in Myanmar were very religious and were not condescending about it.

=== England ===
First introduced for Tilbury in a 2–2 stalemate with Romford, the attacker made his first start as Tilbury bettered Chatham Town 1–0.

Dually registering for AFC Totton as well as Blackfield & Langley in winter 2017, the frontman found the net on his debut for Totton as the Stags got the better of Barnstaple Town 3–1, producing a goal again from 30 yards out in a 1–0 triumph over Larkhall Athletic. Meanwhile, at Blackfield & Langley, he picked up an injury that December.
