= Hein Zar Aung =

Burmese footballer

Personal information
- Full name: Hein Zar Aung
- Date of birth: June 28, 1990 (age 36)
- Position: Midfielder

Team information
- Current team: Magwe
- Number: 23

Senior career*
Years	Team	Apps	(Gls)
- Magwe

International career
2015–	Myanmar	2	(0)
- * Club domestic league appearances and goals

Hein Zar Aung (Burmese: ဟိန်းရာဇာအောင် born 28 June 1990) is a footballer from Myanmar. He made his first appearance for the Myanmar national football team in 2015.
