= Grand Sport Group =

Thai sports equipment manufacturing company

Grand Sport Group Co, Ltd.
- Type: Limited
- Industry: Sportswear; Sports Equipment
- Founded: 1961; 65 years ago
- Founder: Kij Pluchcha-oom
- Headquarters: Bangkok, Thailand
- Area served: Worldwide
- Products: Athletic shoes Apparel; Sports equipment
- Website: grandsport.com

Grand Sport is a sports equipment manufacturing company based in Thailand. It was established in 1961 by Kij Pluchcha-oom, a former basketball player.

== Brands ==
- Grand Sport
- ONYX

== Sponsorships ==
Grand Sport products have been accepted by recognized organizations such as the Asian Volleyball Confederation, Football Association of Singapore, Bahrain Football Association, Oman Football Association, Qatar Football Association, Kuwait Football Association, Uzbekistan Football Federation, Football Federation of Kyrgyz Republic, and Qatar, Oman, Vietnam Olympic Committee. Grand Sport also provides various clubs with kits, such as Dhofar in Oman, and previously Qatar S.C. in Qatar. Now Grand Sport provides for Football Association of Thailand and the Sri Lanka Referees Association.

=== Olympic Committees ===
- Thailand

=== Football ===
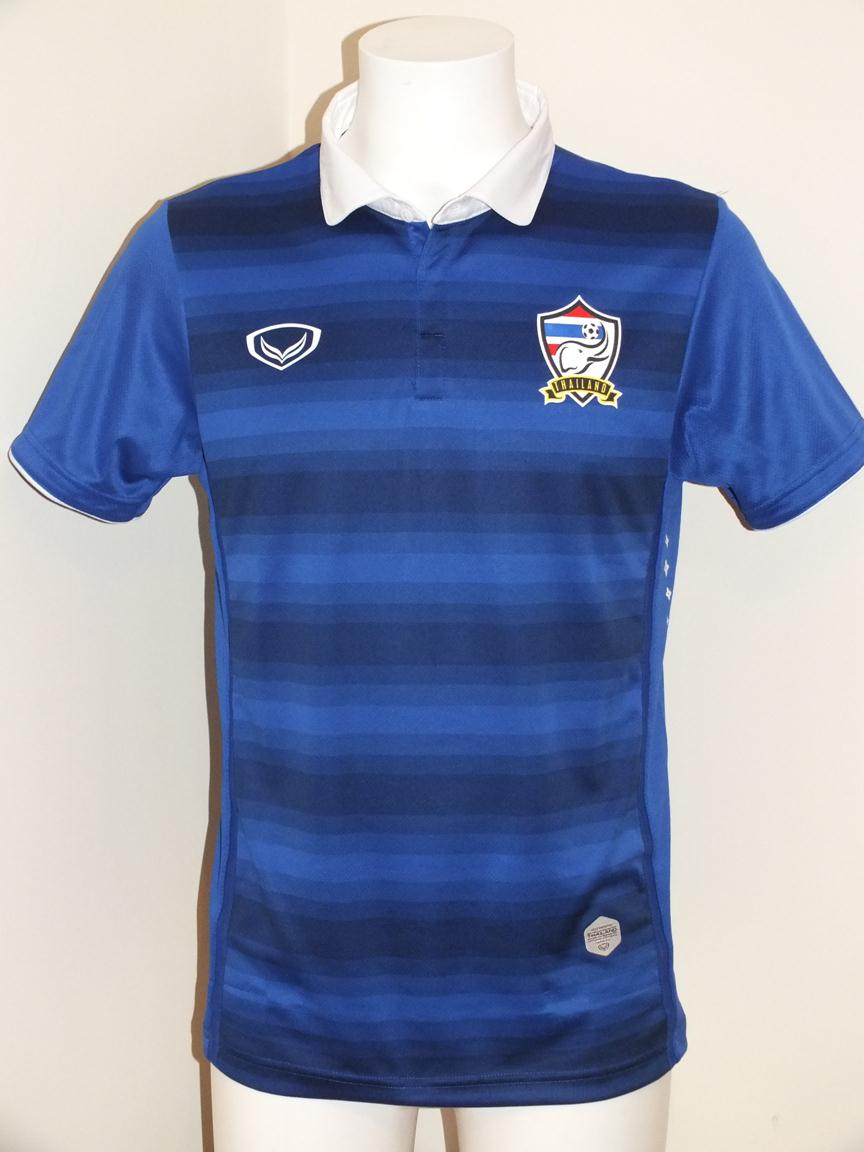
Official Thailand 2014 away shirt made by Grand Sport. Part of the Football Shirt World collection.

=== National Teams ===
==== Asian Football Confederation (AFC) ====
===== AFC current members =====
- Thailand (Sea Games & Asian Games only)
- Laos (until September 2025)

===== AFC former member (1992–) =====
- Bahrain 1985–1997
- Bangladesh 2010–2011
- Uzbekistan 1999
- Kuwait 1992–1997
- Oman 1997–2005
- Qatar 1996–2002
- Kyrgyzstan 2005–2007
- Thailand 2012–2017
- Singapore 1997–2002
- Kazakhstan 1997–1999
- Sri Lanka 2015–2020
- Vietnam 2014–2023
- Laos 2023-2025

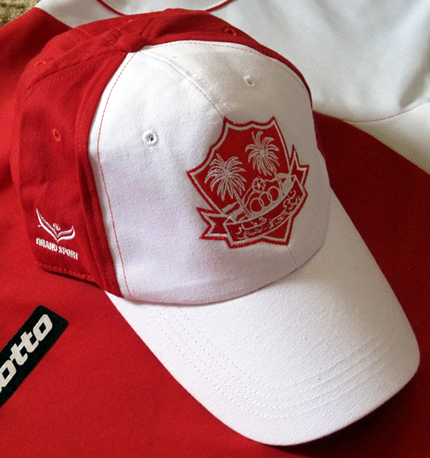
Grand Sport currently provides the Omani club Dhofar with merchandise such as this cap.

=== Club teams ===
==== Asia ====
- (Bhutan) Tensung FC
- (Thailand) Army United 2006–2011
- (Thailand) Osotsapa 2008–2016
- (Thailand) PTT Rayong 2015
- (Thailand) Phuket 2010–2017
- (Thailand) PT Prachuap
- (Thailand) Trat 2019–
- (Thailand) Chiangrai United
- (Thailand) Chiangmai United
- (Thailand) Phrae United
- (Myanmar) Magway 2013–
- (Maldives) B.G. Sports Club 2014–
- (Maldives) TC Sports Club 2014–
- (Cambodia) National Defense Ministry 2019–
- (Vietnam) Gia Viet
- (Vietnam) Hong Linh Ha Tinh
- (Vietnam) Song Lam Nghe An
- (Japan) Hokkaido Consadole Sapporo 2024–

=== Associations ===
Grand Sport is the Official ball supplier for the following leagues and associations:

- (Thailand) Thai League
- (Laos) Lao League

=== Sepak Takraw ===
- Thailand

=== Volleyball ===
==== Associations ====
- Asian Volleyball Confederation

==== Asia ====
- Thailand

== Futsal ==
- (Vietnam) Thai Son Bac
