= Sithu Win (footballer) =

Burmese footballer

Personal information
- Full name: Sithu Win
- Date of birth: December 1, 1984 (age 41)
- Position: Midfielder

International career
Years	Team	Apps	(Gls)
2006–	Myanmar	27	(0)

Sithu Win (Burmese: စည်သူဝင်း; born 1 December 1984) is a footballer from Myanmar. He made his first appearance for the Myanmar national football team in 2006.

== International ==
In 2007, he was a member of the Myanmar U-23 team that reached the final of the 2007 SEA Games.
