= Ko Ko Naing =

Burmese politician

- ကိုကိုနိုင်

Member of the Amyotha Hluttaw
- In office 3 February 2016 – 1 February 2021
- Constituency: Sagaing Region № 8

Personal details
- Born: 20 July 1964 (age 62) Kalewa, Myanmar
- Party: National League for Democracy
- Spouse: Myint Myint Thwe
- Children: Shwe Thame
- Parent(s): Tin Maung (father); Than Htay (mother)
- Education: Mandalay University

Ko Ko Naing (Burmese: ကိုကိုနိုင်; born 20 July 1964) is a Burmese politician who served as an Amyotha Hluttaw member of parliament for Sagaing Region No. 8 constituency. He is a member of the National League for Democracy.

== Early life and education ==
Ko Ko Naing was born on July 20, 1964, in Kalewa, Sagaing Region, Myanmar. He graduated with B.Sc (Botany) from Mandalay University. In 2001, he had worked as video industry and the literature work. He had served campaigner in the 1990 election and in 2012 election campaign.

== Political career ==
He is a member of the National League for Democracy Party, he was elected as an Amyotha Hluttaw representative from Sagaing Region No. 8 parliamentary constituency.
