= Magway Stadium =

Stadium in central Myanmar, used mostly for football matches

Coordinates: 20°08′36″N 94°55′33″E

- Magway Stadium
- Interactive map of Magway Stadium
- Full name: Magway Stadium
- Location: Magway, Burma
- Capacity: 7,000

Tenant
- Magway FC

Magway Stadium is a multi-use stadium in Magway, Burma. It is currently used mostly for football matches and is the home ground of Magway FC of the Myanmar National League. The stadium has a capacity of 7,000 spectators.
