= Steven Law (businessman) =

Burmese businessman

- ထွန်းမြင့်နိုင်
- Born: Htun Myint Naing; 15 May 1958 (age 67) also given as 27 August 1960 (age 65)
- Other names: Htun Myint Naing; Htoon Myint Naing; Lo Ping Zhong (罗秉忠)
- Occupations: Managing Director of Asia World; Owner of Magway FC
- Organization: Asia World Company
- Spouse: Cecilia Ng Seng Hong (m. 1996)
- Children: 2
- Parent: Lo Hsing Han (father)

Steven Law also known as Htun Myint Naing and Lo Ping Zhong (Chinese: 羅秉忠; pinyin: Luó Bǐngzhōng) is a Burmese businessman. He is best known for being the managing director of Asia World, the country's largest conglomerate, and as son of Lo Hsing Han, one of the country's most notable drug traffickers.

== Family ==
Law has six brothers: Lu Law, David Lo, Eric Ping Sin Lo, Henry Lo, Moses Ping Chao Lo, and Aung Kyaw Naing, and two sisters: Daisy Lo and Thida Han Ma. He wed a Singaporean national, Cecilia Ng (Ng Sor Hong), who has two children from a previous marriage, on 16 March 1996.

== Business ==
Law is a prominent businessman well known for being at the helm of Myanmar's largest conglomerate company Asia World, whose investments include a container shipping line, port buildings, and toll road authorities. Law also owns of the Burmese football team Magway FC.

In 1996, he was denied a visa to the United States on suspicion of drug links. His father, Lo Hsing Han, stated that Law had no affiliation with Lo's past history in Kokang's opium industry.
