= Myo Zaw Oo =

Burmese footballer

Personal information
- Full name: Myo Zaw Oo
- Date of birth: 21 October 1992 (age 34)
- Place of birth: Myanmar
- Position: Midfielder

Team information
- Current team: Hanthawaddy United
- Number: 9

Senior career*
Years	Team	Apps	(Gls)
2009–2016	Magway		
2016	Rakhine United		
2017–2019	Yadanarbon	5	(1)
2019–	Hanthawaddy United	65	(1)
- * Club domestic league appearances and goals as of 29 March 2020 ‡ National team caps and goals as of 5 March 2013

Myo Zaw Oo (born 21 October 1992) is a Burmese footballer who plays as a midfielder.
