= Kyi Lwin =

Burmese footballer and coach

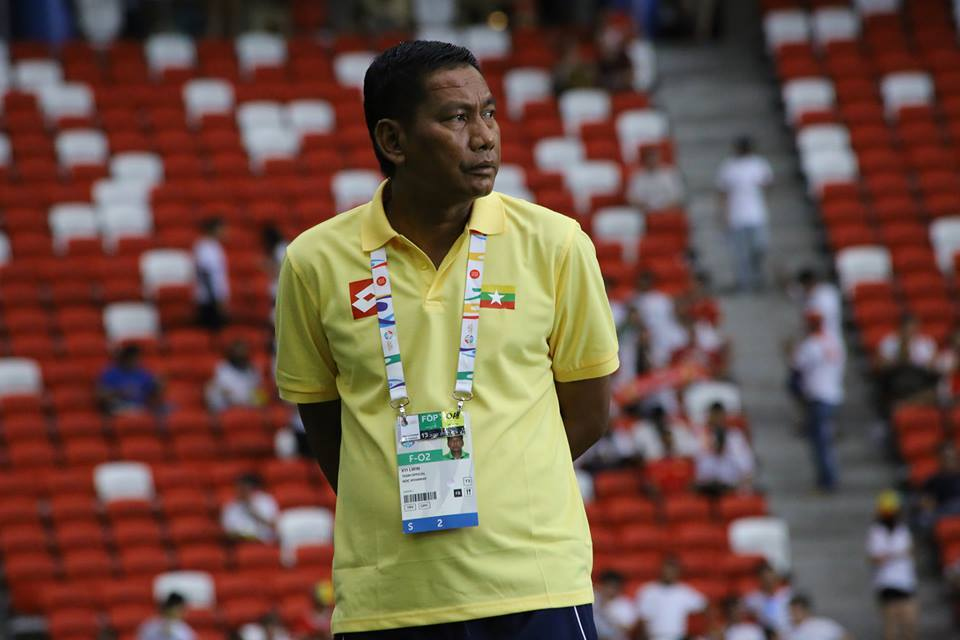
- Lwin as Myanmar manager at the 2015 Southeast Asian Games

Personal information
- Position: Defender

Senior career*
Years	Team	Apps	(Gls)
1996	Yunnan Tianyuan		

International career
1993–1995	Myanmar	4	(2)

Managerial career
- 2015–?: Magway
- 2015–?: Myanmar U23
- ?: Myanmar (assistant)
- * Club domestic league appearances and goals

Kyi Lwin (Burmese: ကြည်လွင်) is a Myanmar football coach and former player who played as a defender.

== Playing career ==
Lwin won the silver medal with the Myanmar national team at the 1993 SEA Games. He played for China League Two side Yunnan Tianyuan in 1996.

== Managerial career ==
In 2015, Lwin worked as head coach of Magway FC of the Myanmar National League and of the Myanmar U23 national team. He led the Myanmar U23 to win the silver medal at the 2015 Southeast Asian Games even with most of the key players given up to the Myanmar U-20 team for the FIFA U-20 World Cup and to the senior national team for the 2018 FIFA World Cup qualifiers.

He has also worked as the assistant coach of the senior national team.

== Honours ==
=== Player ===
Myanmar

- Southeast Asian Games football tournament: runner-up 1993

=== Manager ===
Myanmar U23

- Southeast Asian Games football tournament: runner-up 2015
