= Magwe F.C. =

Magwe FC (မကွေးအက်ဖ်စီ)
- Full name: Magwe Football Club
- Nicknames: The Oil Landers (ရေနံသမားများ)
- Founded: 2009; 17 years ago
- Ground: Magway Stadium
- Capacity: 7,000
- Owner: Tun Myint Naing
- Manager: U Aung Zaw Myo
- League: Myanmar National League
- 2020: 8th
Home colours	Away colours

Magwe Football Club (Burmese: မကွေးဘောလုံးအသင်း) is a Myanmar Professional football club, based at Magwe, Myanmar. The club represents the Magway Region of Central Myanmar. At the founded time, the name of club is Magway Football Club. In 2012, the club was renamed the name as Magwe Football Club.

== History ==
The club was founded in 2009 as Magway Football Club by Htun Myint Naing, managing director of Asia World Co., Ltd., and is one of the eight founding members of the Myanmar National League. In 2012 the club was renamed Magwe Football Club. The club won their first title in 2016, defeating Yangon United in the MFF Cup, qualifying for the 2017 AFC Cup as a result. The club were placed in Group F with Malaysian champions, Johor Darul Ta'zim, Philippines club, Global FC and Cambodian side, Boeung Ket Angkor.

=== Domestic ===
Season	League									MFF Cup	Top goalscorer		Manager	Sportswear	Sponsor
Season	Div.	Pos.	Pl.	W	D	L	GS	GA	P	MFF Cup	Name	League	Manager	Sportswear	Sponsor
2009	1st	3rd	7	4	1	2	9	5	13				(Myanmar) U Kyi Lwin		
2009–10	1st	7th	14	3	5	6	11	18	14				(Myanmar) U Kyi Lwin		
2010	1st	5th	20	10	2	8	37	36	32		Abolaji Larry Samuel	9	(Myanmar) U Kyi Lwin		
2011	1st	7th	22	8	6	8	32	32	30				(Myanmar) U Kyi Lwin		
2012	1st	6th	26	12	8	6	39	21	43	First Round	Lassina Koné	15	(Myanmar) U Kyi Lwin		
2013	1st	6th	22	7	11	4	31	26	32	-			(Myanmar) U Kyi Lwin	Grand Sport	JOMOO
2014	1st	4th	22	11	3	8	37	29	36	Third Round			(Myanmar) U Kyi Lwin	Grand Sport	JOMOO
2015	1st	3rd	22	10	10	2	40	23	40	Semi Final	Soe Min Naing	12	(Myanmar) U Kyi Lwin	Grand Sport	
2016	1st	3rd	22	11	6	5	32	23	39	Winner	Sylla Sekou	9	(Myanmar) U Kyi Lwin	Grand Sport	
2017	1st	7th	22	7	9	6	25	23	30	Semi Final			(Myanmar) U Aung Zaw Myo	Grand Sport	
2018	1st	7th	22	8	6	8	26	26	30	Semi Final	Aung Myint Tun	10	(Myanmar) U Aung Zaw Myo	Grand Sport	

=== Continental ===
Season	Competition	Round	Club	Home	Away	Aggregate
2017	AFC Cup	Group Stage	(Malaysia) Johor Darul Ta'zim	1–1	3–1	4th
2017	AFC Cup	Group Stage	(Philippines) Global	2–4	1–0	4th
2017	AFC Cup	Group Stage	(Cambodia) Boeung Ket Angkor	1–1	0–1	4th

== About the club ==
The club was famous for its aggressive playing style and nurtured many young talent football players. Every season, Magwe Football Club was based on young talent football players as Zaw Min Tun, a national player, who was negotiated by highest transfer fee of Myanmar National League to Yadanarbon Football Club.

== Honours ==
=== Cup ===
- General Aung San Shield
  - Winners (1): 2016
- MFF Charity Cup
  - Winners (1): 2017
- MNL Cup
  - Runners-up (1): 2013

== Seasons ==
- 2015 Magway F.C. season
- 2016 Magway F.C. season
- 2017 Magway F.C. season
