= 2009–10 FC Dacia season =

Dacia Chișinău
2009–10 Moldovan National Division season
- Chairman: Timur Kuriev
- Manager: Roman Pylypchuk; Sergiu Botnaraș; Veaceslav Semionov
- Moldovan National Division: 5th
- Moldovan Cup: Runners-Up vs Sheriff Tiraspol
- UEFA Europa League: Second Qualifying round vs MŠK Žilina
- Top goalscorer: League: Oleksandr Zgura (12); All: Oleksandr Zgura (12)

The 2009–10 season was FC Dacia Chisinau's 8th Moldovan National Division season, in which they finished the season in 5th place, qualifying for UEFA Europa League. They were also Runners Up to Sheriff Tiraspol in the Moldovan Cup and were knocked out of the 2009–10 UEFA Europa League by MŠK Žilina at the Second Qualifying round.

== Squad ==
Note: Flags indicate national team as defined under FIFA eligibility rules; some limited exceptions apply. Players may hold more than one non-FIFA nationality.

No.	Pos.	Nation	Player
1	GK	MDA	Ghenadie Moșneaga
2	DF	CMR	Gock Habib
5	DF	MDA	Dumitru Popovici
9	FW	MDA	Ghenadie Orbu
13	MF	MDA	Victor Bulat
15	MF	MDA	Anatolie Boeștean
16	DF	MDA	Igor Negrescu
17	FW	UKR	Oleksandr Zgura
18	DF	MDA	Iurie Groşev
20	DF	MDA	Ștefan Caraulan
21	DF	MDA	Ion Arabadji
25	GK	MDA	Eugen Matiughin
29	FW	MDA	Oleg Molla

No.	Pos.	Nation	Player
—	GK	RUS	Adam Ismailov
—	DF	MDA	Dmitri Bacal
—	DF	RUS	Magomed Khaskhanov
—	MF	CMR	Claude Maka Kum
—	MF	MDA	Iulian Bursuc
—	MF	MDA	Eugen Gorceac
—	MF	UKR	Anatoliy Matkevych
—	MF	MDA	Serghei Maximov
—	MF	MDA	Iurie Şoimu
—	MF	RUS	Abdulkhamid Akhilgov
—	MF	RUS	Yurii Kotyukov
—	FW	GEO	Vasil Ghutchashvili
—		UKR	Oleksandr Grozov

=== Out on loan ===
Note: Flags indicate national team as defined under FIFA eligibility rules; some limited exceptions apply. Players may hold more than one non-FIFA nationality.

No.	Pos.	Nation	Player
10	FW	GHA	Eric Sackey (at Yangon United)

== Transfer ==
=== Summer ===
In: Note: Flags indicate national team as defined under FIFA eligibility rules; some limited exceptions apply. Players may hold more than one non-FIFA nationality.

No.	Pos.	Nation	Player
2	DF	CMR	Gock Habib (from (Moldova) Nistru Otaci)
6	DF	RUS	Aleksei Bondarev
7	FW	UKR	Oleksandr Zgura (from (Ukraine) Zirka Kirovohrad)
10	FW	GHA	Eric Sackey (from (Moldova) Olimpia Bălți)
15	DF	MDA	Anatolie Boeștean (from (Moldova) Rapid Ghidighici)
20	DF	MDA	Ștefan Caraulan (from (Moldova) Rapid Ghidighici)

Out: Note: Flags indicate national team as defined under FIFA eligibility rules; some limited exceptions apply. Players may hold more than one non-FIFA nationality.

No.	Pos.	Nation	Player
3	DF	UKR	Mykola Hybalyuk (to (Azerbaijan) Gabala)
10	MF	GEO	Levan Korgalidze (to (Georgia (country)) Zestaponi)
12	GK	MDA	Denis Romanenco (to (Moldova) Rapid Ghidighici)

=== Winter ===
In: Note: Flags indicate national team as defined under FIFA eligibility rules; some limited exceptions apply. Players may hold more than one non-FIFA nationality.

No.	Pos.	Nation	Player
29	FW	MDA	Oleg Molla (from (Moldova) Sfântul Gheorghe)
—	GK	RUS	Adam Ismailov (from (Russia) Angusht Nazran)
—	DF	RUS	Magomed Khaskhanov (from (Russia) Angusht Nazran)
—	MF	CMR	Claude Maka Kum (from (Kyrgyzstan) Dordoi Bishkek)
—	MF	MDA	Iulian Bursuc (from (Lithuania) Tauras Tauragė)
—	MF	MDA	Eugen Gorceac (from (Moldova) Academia Chișinău)
—	MF	RUS	Abdulkhamid Akhilgov (from (Russia) Angusht Nazran)
—	MF	UKR	Anatoliy Matkevych
—	MF	RUS	Abdulkhamid Akhilgov (from (Russia) Angusht Nazran)
—	FW	GEO	Vasil Ghutchashvili

Out: Note: Flags indicate national team as defined under FIFA eligibility rules; some limited exceptions apply. Players may hold more than one non-FIFA nationality.

No.	Pos.	Nation	Player
6	DF	RUS	Aleksei Bondarev
8	MF	MDA	Alexandru Onică (to (Ukraine) Vorskla Poltava)
10	FW	GHA	Eric Sackey (loan to (Myanmar) Yangon United)
11	MF	RUS	Andriy Demchenko (to (Ukraine) Metalurh Zaporizhya)
23	MF	RUS	Aleksei Trinitatskiy (to (Russia) Baltika Kaliningrad)

== Competitions ==
=== National Division ===
==== Results summary ====
Overall								Home						Away					
Pld	W	D	L	GF	GA	GD	Pts	W	D	L	GF	GA	GD	W	D	L	GF	GA	GD
33	16	10	7	54	30	+24	58	9	5	3	26	15	+11	7	5	4	28	15	+13

==== Results ====
5 July 2009 1	Academia Chișinău	1–1	Dacia Chişinău	Chișinău
18:00 EEST (UTC+3)	Leucă 57'; Ilescu (yellow card) 70'; Potîrniche (yellow card) 87'	Report	Trinitatskiy (yellow card) 12'; Bulat (yellow card) 76'; Zgura 17'; Matiughin (yellow card) 72'; Hybalyuk (yellow card) 74'; Onică (yellow card) 90'	Stadium: Complexul Sportiv al Tineretului; Attendance: 450; Referee: Ghenadie Sidenco

11 July 2009 2	Dinamo Bender	2–3	Dacia Chişinău	Bender
18:00 EEST (UTC+3)	Şveț (yellow card) 1'; Chiriliuc 3', 66'; Agafonov (yellow card) 11'	Report	Orbu (yellow card) 12'; Arabadji 18' (yellow card) 68'; Sackey 27' (yellow card) 71'; Onică (yellow card) 34' (goal) 62'	Stadium: Dinamo Stadium; Attendance: 800; Referee: Veaceslav Banari

29 July 2009 4	Milsami Orhei	1–5	Dacia Chişinău	Orhei
18:00 EEST (UTC+3)	A.Maximov 44'; Maximov (yellow card) 81'; Mardari (yellow card) 90'	Report	Sackey 36', 38', 85'; Orbu 62' (pen.); Onică 90' (pen.)	Stadium: CSR Orhei; Attendance: 900; Referee: Veaceslav Banari

2 August 2009 5	Dacia Chişinău	1–1	Nistru Otaci	Chişinău
18:00 EEST (UTC+3)	Sackey 52'; Trinitatskiy (yellow card) 70'	Report	Belle 2'; Andrieş (yellow card) 30'; Hmaruc (yellow card) 35'; Repinețchi (yellow card) 78'	Stadium: Dinamo Stadium; Attendance: 500; Referee: Ruslan Muntean

7 August 2009 6	Zimbru Chişinău	2–1	Dacia Chişinău	Chișinău
19:00 EEST (UTC+3)	Catan 13'; Hvorosteanov (yellow card) 30'; Chirşul (yellow card) 53'; Sofroni 78'; Demerji (yellow card) 90'	Report	Zgura 35'	Stadium: Zimbru Stadium; Attendance: 2,000; Referee: Ghenadie Crasnoşan

16 August 2009 7	Dacia Chişinău	4–0	CSCA-Rapid Chişinău	Chişinău
17:00 EEST (UTC+3)	Negrescu (yellow card) 23'; Sackey 31', 53', 75', 80' (pen.); Bulat (yellow card) 40'; Onică (yellow card) 49'	Report	Ciortan (yellow card) 20'; Seul (yellow card) 45'; Istrati (yellow card) 51'; Amarandei (yellow card) 67'	Stadium: Dinamo Stadium; Attendance: 500; Referee: Ghenadie Sidenco

22 August 2009 8	Sheriff Tiraspol	0–0	Dacia Chişinău	Tiraspol
20:00 EEST (UTC+3)	Tsynya (yellow card) 86'	Report	Habib (yellow card) 86'	Stadium: Sheriff Stadium; Attendance: 1,000; Referee: Veaceslav Banari

26 August 2009 3	Dacia Chişinău	1–0	Tiraspol	Chişinău
17:00 EEST (UTC+3)	Zgura 28'	Report		Stadium: Dinamo Stadium; Attendance: 200; Referee: Igor Şaţchii

30 August 2009 9	Dacia Chişinău	1–0	Sfântul Gheorghe	Chişinău
17:00 EEST (UTC+3)	Sackey (yellow card) 45'; Negrescu (yellow card) 53'; Zgura 71'	Report	Vremea (yellow card) 51'; Bogdan (yellow card) 57'; Plătică (yellow card) 78'	Stadium: Dinamo Stadium; Attendance: 200; Referee: Iurie Covtun

12 September 2009 10	Olimpia Bălți	0–1	Dacia Chişinău	Bălți
16:00 EEST (UTC+3)	Ogada (yellow card) 32'; Adaramola (yellow card) 53'; Cheltuială (yellow card) 56'	Report	Arabadji 12'; Habib (yellow card) 43'; Zgura (yellow card) 90+2'	Stadium: Olimpia Bălți Stadium; Attendance: 1,000; Referee: Ghenadie Crasnoşan

20 September 2009 11	Dacia Chişinău	1–2	Iskra-Stal	Chişinău
16:00 EEST (UTC+3)	Habib (yellow card) 74'; Orbu 88'	Report	Rudac 13'; Zhurka (yellow card) 20'; Hauşi (yellow card) 37' (yellow-red card) 74'; Țaranu 52' (yellow card) 74'	Stadium: Dinamo Stadium; Attendance: 300; Referee: Vladislav Ivancenco

26 September 2009 12	Dacia Chişinău	1–0	Academia Chișinău	Chişinău
16:00 EEST (UTC+3)	Caraulan (yellow card) 31'; Zgura (yellow card) 38' (goal) 69'; Orbu (yellow card) 87'; Onică (yellow card) 90'	Report	Chiciuc (yellow card) 37'; Slivca (yellow card) 44'; Indoitu (yellow card) 70'; Ginsari (yellow card) 88'	Stadium: Dinamo Stadium; Attendance: 150; Referee: Iurie Covtun

4 October 2009 13	Dacia Chişinău	3–2	Dinamo Bender	Chişinău
15:00 EEST (UTC+3)	Zgura 38', 83' (yellow card) 84'; Popovici 40'; Bulat (yellow card) 54'; Caraulan (yellow card) 66'	Report	Arabadji 18' (o.g.); Tofan (yellow card) 71'; Boicenco 89'	Stadium: Dinamo Stadium; Attendance: 200; Referee: Ghenadie Crasnoşan

18 October 2009 14	Tiraspol	0–3	Dacia Chişinău	Tiraspol
18:00 EEST (UTC+3)	Vornișel (yellow card) 35'	Report	Arabadji 14'; Sackey (yellow card) 40'; Boeștean (yellow card) 45' (goal) 46'; Onică 53'	Stadium: Sheriff Stadium; Attendance: 200; Referee: Veaceslav Banari

24 October 2009 15	Dacia Chişinău	2–0	Milsami Orhei	Chişinău
15:00 EEST (UTC+3)	Popovici (yellow card) 18'; Boeștean 29'; Caraulan (yellow card) 51'; Arabadji 54'	Report	Mardari (yellow card) 53'	Stadium: Dinamo Stadium; Attendance: 300; Referee: Igor Uzun

28 October 2009 16	Nistru Otaci	0–6	Dacia Chişinău	Călărășeuca
14:00 EET (UTC+2)	Orlovschi (yellow card) 12'; Maliarenco (yellow card) 56'; Cusciac (yellow card) 76'	Report	Orbu 13' (pen.); Bulat 33'; Onică 39'; Boeștean 41'; Orlovschi 45' (o.g.); Buză (yellow card) 77'; Zgura 81'	Stadium: Călărășeuca Stadium; Attendance: 300; Referee: Victor Stînă

1 November 2009 17	Dacia Chişinău	1–0	Zimbru Chişinău	Chişinău
14:00 EET (UTC+2)	Zgura 38'; Trinitatskiy (yellow card) 54'; Onică (yellow card) 59'; Arabadji (yellow card) 69'	Report	Hvorosteanov (yellow card) 11'; Bojii (yellow card) 22'; Andronic (yellow card) 59'; Cojocari (yellow card) 87'	Stadium: Dinamo Stadium; Attendance: 300; Referee: Vladislav Ivancenco

7 November 2009 18	Rapid Ghidighici	0–2	Dacia Chişinău	Ghidighici
14:00 EET (UTC+2)	Romanenco (yellow card) 25'; Ciortan (yellow card) 73'; Soltanici (yellow card) 90'	Report	Zgura 26' (pen.); Popovici 41'; Trinitatskiy (yellow card) 60'	Stadium: Ghidighici Stadium; Attendance: 500; Referee: Ghenadie Crasnoşan

18 November 2009 19	Dacia Chişinău	1–2	Sheriff Tiraspol	Chişinău
14:00 EET (UTC+2)	Onică (yellow card) 53'; Zgura 90'	Report	Nadson 39' (yellow card) 76'; Jymmy 45'; Mamah (yellow card) 47'; Branković (yellow card) 90'	Stadium: Dinamo Stadium; Attendance: 600; Referee: Vladislav Ivancenco

7 March 2010 20	Sfântul Gheorghe Suruceni	0–0	Dacia Chişinău	Suruceni
14:00 EET (UTC+2)	Ternavschi (yellow card) 64'; Mocanu (yellow card) 71'	Report	Orbu (yellow card) 15'; Boeștean (yellow card) 47'	Stadium: Suruceni Stadium; Attendance: 350; Referee: Victor Gheciu

13 March 2010 21	Dacia Chişinău	1–1	Olimpia Bălţi	Chişinău
12:00 EET (UTC+2)	Kotyukov (yellow card) 6'; Orbu (yellow card) 35'; Caraulan (yellow card) 82'; Bursuc 90'	Report	Jerome 21'; Verbețchi (yellow card) 23'; Tcaciuc (yellow card) 57'; Kourouma (yellow card) 67'	Stadium: Dinamo Stadium; Attendance: 500; Referee: Ghenadie Crasnoşan

17 March 2010 22	Iskra-Stal	3–1	Dacia Chişinău	Rîbnița
15:30 EET (UTC+2)	Țaranu 52'; Kilikevych 54', 57'	Report	Habib 60'	Stadium: Orășenesc Stadium; Attendance: 400; Referee: Valeriu Sorochin

21 March 2010 23	Dacia Chişinău	0–0	Dinamo Bendery	Chişinău
12:00 EET (UTC+2)	Caraulan (yellow card) 65'	Report		Stadium: Dinamo Stadium; Attendance: 350; Referee: Igor Şaţchii

27 March 2010 24	Sfântul Gheorghe Suruceni	2–2	Dacia Chişinău	Suruceni
14:00 EET (UTC+2)	Posmac 10'; Rotaru (red card) 25'; Bogdan 53' (yellow card) 68'; Plătică (yellow card) 87'	Report	Akhilgov 37'; Molla (yellow card) 53'; Orbu 67'; Grozov (yellow card) 87'	Stadium: Suruceni Stadium; Attendance: 200; Referee: Igor Uzun

3 April 2010 25	Dacia Chişinău	0–0	Sheriff Tiraspol	Chişinău
13:00 EEST (UTC+3)	Bursuc (yellow card) 45'; Arabadji (yellow card) 66'	Report	Nikolić (yellow card) 79'; Hoderean (yellow card) 83'	Stadium: Dinamo Stadium; Attendance: 500; Referee: Ghenadie Sidenco

10 April 2010 26	Iskra-Stal	0–0	Dacia Chişinău	Rîbnița
16:00 EEST (UTC+3)	Chiriliuc (yellow card) 70'; Rudac (yellow card) 89'	Report	Habib (yellow card) 61'	Stadium: Orășenesc Stadium; Attendance: 2,000; Referee: Veaceslav Banari

19 April 2010 27	Dacia Chişinău	3–0	Nistru Otaci	Chişinău
16:00 EEST (UTC+3)	Klimakov 10' (o.g.); Matkevych (yellow card) 53'; Guchashvili (yellow card) 64' (goal) 75'; Arabadji (yellow card) 68'; Zgura 84'; Gorceac (yellow card) 89'	Report		Stadium: Dinamo Stadium; Attendance: 500; Referee: Igor Şaţchii

23 April 2010 28	Dacia Chişinău	2–4	Olimpia Bălţi	Chişinău
16:00 EEST (UTC+3)	Akhilgov 38'; Habib 65'	Report	Glega 10'; Șișchin 25', 73' (pen.); Cheltuială 34'	Stadium: Dinamo Stadium; Attendance: 500; Referee: Victor Stînă

2 May 2010 29	Zimbru Chişinău	1–0	Dacia Chişinău	Chișinău
17:00 EEST (UTC+3)	Sidorenco 32'; Berco (yellow card) 89'	Report	Negrescu (yellow card) 45'; Habib (yellow card) 61' (yellow-red card) 90'; Kotyukov (yellow card) 75'	Stadium: Zimbru Stadium; Attendance: 5,500; Referee: Ghenadie Crasnoşan

8 May 2010 30	Dacia Chişinău	2–2	CSCA-Rapid Chişinău	Chişinău
19:00 EEST (UTC+3)	Ghutchashvili (yellow card) 40' (goal) 70'; Popovici (yellow card) 47'; Caraulan (yellow card) 47'; Bulat 60'; Matiughin (yellow card) 90'	Report	Franțuz 25', 90' (pen.) (yellow card) 31'; Cravcescu (yellow card) 33'; Rusu (yellow card) 45'; Luca (yellow card) 77'; Berbinschi (yellow card) 88'; A A.Grosu (yellow card) 90'	Stadium: Dinamo Stadium; Attendance: 500; Referee: Vladislav Ivancenco

15 May 2010 31	Academia Chișinău	3–1	Dacia Chişinău	Chișinău
17:00 EEST (UTC+3)	Cașcaval 2'; Lambarschi 44'; Bludnov 56'	Report	Arabadji (yellow card) 45'; Bursuc 48'; Kotyukov (red card) 52'	Stadium: Complexul Sportiv al Tineretului; Attendance: 200; Referee: Veaceslav Banari

19 May 2010 32	Dacia Chişinău	2–1	Milsami Orhei	Chişinău
14:00 EEST (UTC+3)	Caraulan (yellow card) 33' (goal) 87'; Molla 39'; Kum (yellow card) 63'; Gorceac (yellow card) 90'	Report	Marian (yellow card) 30'; Potlog (yellow card) 63'; Castravet (yellow card) 69'; Gliga 78'	Stadium: Dinamo Stadium; Attendance: 500; Referee: Ion Arnaut

23 May 2010 33	Tiraspol	0–2	Dacia Chişinău	Tiraspol
17:00 EEST (UTC+3)	Paye (yellow card) 71'	Report	Bulat 21'; Gorceac 77'	Stadium: Sheriff Stadium; Attendance: 200; Referee: Ruslan Muntean

==== Table ====
Pos	Team	Pld	W	D	L	GF	GA	GD	Pts	Qualification or relegation
3	Olimpia Bălți	33	17	9	7	45	23	+22	60	Qualification for the Europa League first qualifying round (Note: Since Sheriff, winners of the 2009–10 Moldovan Cup, also won the league, Dacia will enter the first and Iskra-Stal the second qualifying round of the UEFA Europa League.)
4	Zimbru Chișinău	33	17	8	8	47	29	+18	59	
5	Dacia Chișinău	33	16	10	7	54	30	+24	58	Qualification for the Europa League first qualifying round
6	CSCA-Rapid Chișinău	33	12	9	12	40	39	+1	45	
7	Academia Chișinău	33	11	9	13	36	37	−1	42	

Source: Moldovan Football Federation (in Romanian)
Rules for classification: 1st points; 2nd head-to-head points; 3rd head-to-head goal difference; 4th goal difference; 5th goals scored; 6th number of wins; 7th Fair play competition

=== Moldovan Cup ===
30 September 2009 Second round	Viitorul Orhei	0–2	Dacia Chişinău	Chiajna
16:00 EEST (UTC+3)		Report	Sackey 21', 36'	Stadium: Stadionul Concordia

22 November 2009 Quarterfinal 1st leg	Tiraspol	0–0	Dacia Chişinău	Tiraspol
16:00 EET (UTC+2)		Report		Stadium: Sheriff Stadium

28 November 2009 Quarterfinal 2nd leg	Dacia Chişinău	3–1 (3–1 agg.)	Tiraspol	Chişinău
13:00 EET (UTC+2)	Onică 39'; Orbu 44'; Habib 81'	Report	Vornishel 87'	Stadium: Dinamo Stadium

14 April 2010 Semifinal 1st leg	Dacia Chişinău	4–2	Olimpia Bălți	Chişinău
16:00 EEST (UTC+3)	Matkevych 37'; Guchashvili 40'; Orbu 76' (pen.); Grosev 79'	Report	Orlovski 45'; Camara 72'	Stadium: Dinamo Stadium

28 April 2010 Semifinal 2nd leg	Olimpia Bălți	0–1 (2–5 agg.)	Dacia Chişinău	Bălți
15:00 EEST (UTC+3)		Report	Bulat 40'	Stadium: Olimpia Bălți Stadium

30 May 2010 Final	Dacia Chişinău	0–2	Sheriff Tiraspol	Chișinău
19:30 EEST (UTC+3)		Report	França 27', 52'	Stadium: Zimbru Stadium

=== UEFA Europa League ===
==== Qualifying round ====
16 July 2009 Second qualifying round 1st leg	MŠK Žilina (Slovakia)	2–0	(Moldova) Dacia Chişinău	Žilina, Slovakia
18:30 EEST (UTC+3)	Oravec 57'; Zlatković (yellow card) 67'; Lietava 77'	Report	Grosev (yellow card) 23'	Stadium: Stadium Pod Dubňom; Attendance: 3,454; Referee: Stelios Trifonos (Cyprus)

23 July 2009 Second qualifying round 2nd leg	Dacia Chişinău (Moldova)	0–1 (0–3 agg.)	(Slovakia) MŠK Žilina	Chişinău, Moldova
19:30 EEST (UTC+3)	Orbu (yellow card) 6'; Sackey (yellow card) 64'; Trinitatskiy (yellow card) 65' (yellow-red card) 86'; Bulat (yellow card) 76'	Report	Oravec 47'; Leitner (yellow card) 60'; Jež (yellow card) 80'	Stadium: Dinamo Stadium; Attendance: 2,500; Referee: Adrian McCourt (Northern Ireland)

== Squad statistics ==
=== Appearances and goals ===
No.	Pos	Nat	Player	Total		National Division		Moldovan Cup		UEFA Europa League	
No.	Pos	Nat	Player	Apps	Goals	Apps	Goals	Apps	Goals	Apps	Goals
1	GK	(Moldova) MDA	Ghenadie Moșneaga	23	0	20+2	0	0	0	1	0
2	DF	(Cameroon) CMR	Gock Habib	25	2	21+2	2	0	0	2	0
5	DF	(Moldova) MDA	Dumitru Popovici	28	2	24+2	2	0	0	0+2	0
9	FW	(Moldova) MDA	Ghenadie Orbu	34	4	28+4	4	0	0	2	0
13	MF	(Moldova) MDA	Victor Bulat	28	3	24+2	3	0	0	2	0
15	MF	(Moldova) MDA	Anatolie Boeștean	16	3	12+4	3	0	0	0	0
16	DF	(Moldova) MDA	Igor Negrescu	16	0	13+1	0	0	0	2	0
17	FW	(Ukraine) UKR	Oleksandr Zgura	29	12	24+3	12	0	0	1+1	0
18	DF	(Moldova) MDA	Iurie Groşev	27	0	21+4	0	0	0	2	0
20	DF	(Moldova) MDA	Ștefan Caraulan	26	1	21+3	1	0	0	2	0
21	DF	(Moldova) MDA	Ion Arabadji	23	4	22+1	4	0	0	0	0
25	GK	(Moldova) MDA	Eugen Matiughin	14	0	12+1	0	0	0	1	0
29	FW	(Moldova) MDA	Oleg Molla	7	1	3+4	1	0	0	0	0
	GK	(Russia) RUS	Adam Ismailov	1	0	1	0	0	0	0	0
	DF	(Moldova) MDA	Dmitri Bacal	8	0	4+4	0	0	0	0	0
	DF	(Russia) RUS	Magomed Khaskhanov	4	0	4	0	0	0	0	0
	MF	(Cameroon) CMR	Claude Maka Kum	6	0	3+3	0	0	0	0	0
	MF	(Moldova) MDA	Iulian Bursuc	11	2	8+3	2	0	0	0	0
	MF	(Moldova) MDA	Eugen Gorceac	8	1	8	1	0	0	0	0
	MF	(Ukraine) UKR	Anatoliy Matkevych	5	0	4+1	0	0	0	0	0
	MF	(Moldova) MDA	Serghei Maximov	1	0	0+1	0	0	0	0	0
	MF	(Moldova) MDA	Iurie Şoimu	22	0	12+10	0	0	0	0	0
	MF	(Russia) RUS	Abdulkhamid Akhilgov	7	2	5+2	2	0	0	0	0
	MF	(Russia) RUS	Yurii Kotyukov	9	0	7+2	0	0	0	0	0
	FW	(Georgia (country)) GEO	Vasil Ghutchashvili	11	2	5+6	2	0	0	0	0
		(Ukraine) UKR	Oleksandr Grozov	7	0	5+2	0	0	0	0	0
Players away from Dacia Chişinău on loan:
10	FW	(Ghana) GHA	Eric Sackey	14	9	11+1	9	0	0	2	0
Players who appeared for Dacia Chişinău no longer at the club:
3	DF	(Ukraine) UKR	Mykola Hybalyuk	2	0	2	0	0	0	0	0
6	DF	(Russia) RUS	Aleksei Bondarev	1	0	1	0	0	0	0	0
8	MF	(Moldova) MDA	Alexandru Onică	18	4	17	4	0	0	1	0
10	MF	(Georgia (country)) GEO	Levan Korgalidze	1	0	1	0	0	0	0	0
11	FW	(Russia) RUS	Andriy Demchenko	3	0	1	0	0	0	2	0
19	MF	(Moldova) MDA	Eugen Buză	13	0	1+10	0	0	0	0+2	0
23	MF	(Russia) RUS	Aleksei Trinitatskiy	20	0	18	0	0	0	2	0
	MF	(Moldova) MDA	Andrei Turcu	3	0	0+3	0	0	0	0	0

=== Goal scorers ===
Place	Position	Nation	Number	Name	National Division	Moldovan Cup	UEFA Europa League	Total
1	FW	(Ukraine)	17	Oleksandr Zgura	12	0	0	12
2	FW	(Ghana)	10	Eric Sackey	9	2	0	11
3	FW	(Moldova)	9	Ghenadie Orbu	4	2	0	6
4	MF	(Moldova)	8	Alexandru Onică	4	1	0	5
5	DF	(Moldova)	21	Ion Arabadji	4	0	0	4
5	MF	(Moldova)	13	Victor Bulat	3	1	0	4
7	MF	(Moldova)	15	Anatolie Boeștean	3	0	0	3
7	DF	(Cameroon)	2	Gock Habib	2	1	0	3
7	FW	(Georgia (country))		Vasili Guchashvili	2	1	0	3
10	MF	(Moldova)	5	Dumitru Popovici	2	0	0	2
10	DF	(Moldova)		Iulian Bursuc	2	0	0	2
10	FW	(Russia)		Abdulkhamid Akhilgov	2	0	0	2
10				Own goal	2	0	0	2
14	MF	(Moldova)	29	Oleg Molla	1	0	0	1
14	DF	(Moldova)	20	Ștefan Caraulan	1	0	0	1
14	FW	(Moldova)		Eugen Gorceac	1	0	0	1
14	DF	(Moldova)	18	Iurie Grosev	0	1	0	1
14	MF	(Ukraine)		Anatoliy Matkevych	0	1	0	1
				TOTALS	54	10	0	64

=== Disciplinary record ===
Number	Nation	Position	Name	National Division		Moldovan Cup		UEFA Europa League		Total	
Number	Nation	Position	Name	Yellow card	Red card	Yellow card	Red card	Yellow card	Red card	Yellow card	Red card
9	(Moldova)	FW	Ghenadie Orbu	0	0	0	0	1	0	1	0
13	(Moldova)	MF	Victor Bulat	0	0	0	0	1	0	1	0
18	(Moldova)	DF	Iurie Grosev	0	0	0	0	1	0	1	0
21	(Ghana)	FW	Eric Sackey	0	0	0	0	1	0	1	0
23	(Russia)	MF	Aleksei Trinitatskiy	0	0	0	0	2	1	2	1
			TOTALS	0	0	0	0	6	1	6	1
