= FC Dacia Chișinău in European football =

Overview of FC Dacia Chișinău's role in European football

Dacia Chișinău in European football
- Club: Dacia Chișinău
- Seasons played: 12
- Most appearances: Ghenadie Orbu (25)
- Top scorer: Ghenadie Orbu (4)
- First entry: 2003 UEFA Intertoto Cup
- Latest entry: 2017–18 UEFA Europa League

Dacia Chișinău was a Moldovan football club based in Chișinău, Moldova.

== History ==
Dacia Chișinău's trist season in European football came in 2003, when they entered the 2003 UEFA Intertoto Cup after having won the Moldovan "A" Division for the first time during the 2001–02 season.

=== Matches ===
As of match played 6 July 2017

| Season | Competition | Round | Club | Home | Away | Aggregate |
|---|---|---|---|---|---|---|
| 2003 | UEFA Intertoto Cup | 1R | (Faroe Islands) GÍ | 1–0 | 4–1 | 5–1 |
| 2003 | UEFA Intertoto Cup | 2R | (Albania) Partizani Tirana | 2–0 | 3–0 | 5–0 |
| 2003 | UEFA Intertoto Cup | 3R | (Germany) Schalke 04 | 1–2 | 0–1 | 1–3 |
| 2005–06 | UEFA Cup | 1QR | (Liechtenstein) Vaduz | 1–0 | 0–2 | 1–2 |
| 2007 | UEFA Intertoto Cup | 1R | (Azerbaijan) Baku | 1–1 | 1–1 | 2–2 (3–1 p) |
| 2007 | UEFA Intertoto Cup | 2R | (Switzerland) St. Gallen | 0–1 | 1–0 | 1–1 (3–0 p) |
| 2007 | UEFA Intertoto Cup | 3R | (Germany) Hamburg | 1–1 | 0–4 | 1–5 |
| 2008–09 | UEFA Cup | 1QR | (Serbia) Borac Čačak | 1–1 | 1–3 | 2–4 |
| 2009–10 | UEFA Europa League | 2QR | (Slovakia) MŠK Žilina | 0–1 | 0–3 | 0–4 |
| 2010–11 | UEFA Europa League | 1QR | (Montenegro) Zeta | 0–0 | 1–1 | 1–1 (a) |
| 2010–11 | UEFA Europa League | 2QR | (Sweden) Kalmar | 0–2 | 0–0 | 0–2 |
| 2011–12 | UEFA Champions League | 2QR | (Georgia (country)) Zestaponi | 2–0 | 0–3 | 2–3 |
| 2012–13 | UEFA Europa League | 1QR | (Slovenia) Celje | 1–0 | 1–0 | 2–0 |
| 2012–13 | UEFA Europa League | 2QR | (Sweden) Elfsborg | 1–0 | 0–2 | 1–2 |
| 2013–14 | UEFA Europa League | 1QR | (Albania) Teuta Durrës | 2–0 | 1–3 | 3–3 (a) |
| 2013–14 | UEFA Europa League | 2QR | (Ukraine) Chornomorets Odesa | 2–1 | 0–2 | 2–3 |
| 2015–16 | UEFA Europa League | 1QR | (North Macedonia) Renova | 4–1 | 1–0 | 5–1 |
| 2015–16 | UEFA Europa League | 2QR | (Slovakia) MŠK Žilina | 1–2 | 2–4 | 3–6 |
| 2016–17 | UEFA Europa League | 1QR | (Azerbaijan) Kapaz | 0–1 | 0–0 | 0–1 |
| 2017–18 | UEFA Europa League | 1QR | (North Macedonia) Shkëndija | 0–4 | 0–3 | 0–7 |

== Player statistics ==
=== Appearances ===
As of match played 6 July 2017

| | Name | Years | UEFA Intertoto Cup | UEFA Cup | UEFA Champions League | UEFA Europa League | Total | Ratio |
|---|---|---|---|---|---|---|---|---|
| 1 | (Moldova) Ghenadie Orbu | 2001–2015 | 8 (1) | 4 (0) | 2 (1) | 11 (2) | 25 (4) | 0.16 |
| 2 | (Moldova) Vitalie Mardari | 2003–2009 | 12 (0) | 3 (0) | (-) | (-) | 15 (0) | 0 |
| 3 | (Togo) Abdoul-Gafar Mamah | 2010–2017 | (-) | (-) | 2 (0) | 12 (0) | 14 (0) | 0 |
| 3 | (Moldova) Maxim Mihaliov | 2011–2014; 2015–2016 | (-) | (-) | 2 (0) | 12 (3) | 14 (3) | 0.21 |
| 5 | (Moldova) Andrei Martin | 2002–2005; 2005–2009 | 11 (1) | 1 (0) | (-) | (-) | 12 (1) | 0.08 |
| 6 | (Moldova) Eugen Matiughin | 2009–2014 | (-) | (-) | (-) | 11 (0) | 11 (0) | 0 |
| 7 | (Moldova) Sergiu Jăpălău | 2002–2005; 2008–2009 | 6 (1) | 4 (0) | (-) | (-) | 10 (1) | 0.1 |
| 7 | (Russia) Maksim Andronik | 2004–2009 | 6 (0) | 4 (0) | (-) | (-) | 10 (0) | 0 |
| 7 | (Moldova) Alexandru Onica | 2005–2006; 2006–2009; 2011–2012 | 6 (0) | 2 (0) | 1 (0) | 1 (0) | 10 (0) | 0 |
| 7 | (Moldova) Andrei Cojocari | 2010–2013 | (-) | (-) | 2 (0) | 8 (0) | 10 (0) | 0 |
| 7 | (Moldova) Veaceslav Posmac | 2012–2017 | (-) | (-) | (-) | 10 (0) | 10 (0) | 0 |
| 12 | (Moldova) Denis Ilescu | 2011–2015; 2017–2018 | (-) | (-) | 0 (1) | 8 (0) | 9 (0) | 0 |
| 12 | (Russia) Vasili Pavlov | 2011–2013; 2015 | (-) | (-) | 1 (0) | 8 (3) | 9 (3) | 0.33 |
| 14 | (Moldova) Liviu Andriuta | 2002–2007 | 6 (1) | 2 (0) | (-) | (-) | 8 (1) | 0.13 |
| 14 | (Moldova) Vitalie Gluhenchi | 2003–2007 | 6 (0) | 2 (0) | (-) | (-) | 8 (0) | 0 |
| 14 | (Moldova) Alexandru Gorobet | 2002–2007 | 6 (0) | 2 (0) | (-) | (-) | 8 (0) | 0 |
| 14 | (Moldova) Vladimir Jăpălău | 2001–2007 | 6 (1) | 2 (1) | (-) | (-) | 8 (2) | 0.25 |
| 14 | (Moldova) Sergiu Potrimba | 2002–2007 | 6 (0) | 2 (0) | (-) | (-) | 8 (0) | 0 |
| 14 | (Moldova) Dumitru Popovici | 2009–2013 | (-) | (-) | 1 (1) | 7 (0) | 8 (1) | 0.13 |
| 14 | (Moldova) Artiom Gaiduchevici | 2011–2013 | (-) | (-) | 2 (0) | 6 (0) | 8 (0) | 0 |
| 14 | (Moldova) Eugeniu Cociuc | 2012–2016 | (-) | (-) | (-) | 8 (2) | 8 (2) | 0.25 |
| 14 | (Ukraine) Maksym Havrylenko | 2014–2017 | (-) | (-) | 0 (-) | 8 (0) | 8 (0) | 0 |
| 23 | (Moldova) Igor Negrescu | 2002–2011 | 3 (0) | (-) | (-) | 4 (0) | 7 (0) | 0 |
| 23 | (Moldova) Dumitru Gusila | 2006–2008 | 6 (0) | 1 (0) | (-) | (-) | 7 (0) | 0 |
| 23 | (Moldova) Eugeniu Boicenco | 2007; 2008–2009 | 5 (1) | 2 (0) | (-) | (-) | 7 (1) | 0.14 |
| 23 | (Montenegro) Miloš Krkotić | 2011–2015 | (-) | (-) | 1 (0) | 6 (0) | 7 (0) | 0 |
| 27 | (Moldova) Grigore Badea | 2003–2004 | 6 (1) | (-) | (-) | (-) | 6 (1) | 0.17 |
| 27 | (Moldova) Alexandru Golban | 2000–2003 | 6 (3) | (-) | (-) | (-) | 6 (3) | 0.5 |
| 27 | (Moldova) Alexandru Mereuta | 2002–2003 | 6 (0) | (-) | (-) | (-) | 6 (0) | 0 |
| 27 | (Moldova) Cornel Popov | 2002–2004 | 6 (0) | (-) | (-) | (-) | 6 (0) | 0 |
| 27 | (Moldova) Vadim Bolohan | 2007–2008 | 6 (0) | (-) | (-) | (-) | 6 (0) | 0 |
| 27 | (Moldova) Dumitru Alin Lipa | 2007–2008 | 6 (1) | (-) | (-) | (-) | 6 (1) | 0.17 |
| 27 | (Moldova) Nicolai Mincev | 2006–2008 | 6 (0) | (-) | (-) | (-) | 6 (0) | 0 |
| 27 | (Moldova) Mihail Moraru | 2002–2008 | 6 (0) | (-) | (-) | (-) | 6 (0) | 0 |
| 27 | (Moldova) Iurie Soimu | 2006–2008; 2009–2011 | 6 (0) | (-) | (-) | (-) | 6 (0) | 0 |
| 27 | (Moldova) Victor Bulat | 2008–2010 | (-) | 2 (1) | (-) | 4 (0) | 6 (1) | 0.17 |
| 27 | (Georgia (country)) Levan Korgalidze | 2008–2009; 2010–2011 | (-) | 2 (1) | (-) | 4 (0) | 6 (1) | 0.17 |
| 27 | (Ukraine) Yuriy Hroshev | 2009–2011 | (-) | (-) | (-) | 6 (0) | 6 (0) | 0 |
| 27 | (Moldova) Vladimir Dragovozov | 2010–2014 | (-) | (-) | (-) | 6 (0) | 6 (0) | 0 |
| 27 | (North Macedonia) Goran Dimovski | 2011–2012 | (-) | (-) | 2 (0) | 4 (0) | 6 (0) | 0 |
| 27 | (Montenegro) Slaven Stjepanović | 2011–2012; 2014–2016; 2017 | (-) | (-) | 2 (0) | 4 (0) | 6 (0) | 0 |
| 27 | (Togo) Mani Sapol | 2015–2016 | (-) | (-) | (-) | 6 (0) | 6 (0) | 0 |
| 43 | (Moldova) Ghenadie Pușca | 2005–2008; 2009 | 5 (0) | (-) | (-) | (-) | 5 (0) | 0 |
| 43 | (Moldova) Alexandru Bejan | 2012–2017 | (-) | (-) | (-) | 5 (0) | 5 (0) | 0 |
| 45 | (Moldova) Denis Orbu | 2002–2007 | 3 (2) | 1 (-) | (-) | (-) | 4 (2) | 0.5 |
| 45 | (Moldova) Marius Călin | 2002–2007 | 2 (0) | 2 (-) | (-) | (-) | 4 (0) | 0 |
| 45 | (Moldova) Iulian Bursuc | 2010–2011 | (-) | (-) | (-) | 4 (0) | 4 (0) | 0 |
| 45 | (Moldova) Eugen Gorceac | 2010–2011 | (-) | (-) | (-) | 4 (0) | 4 (0) | 0 |
| 45 | (Georgia (country)) Mamuka Lomidze | 2010–2011 | (-) | (-) | (-) | 4 (0) | 4 (0) | 0 |
| 45 | (Moldova) Oleg Șișchin | 2010 | (-) | (-) | (-) | 4 (0) | 4 (0) | 0 |
| 45 | (Georgia (country)) Davit Gamezardashvili | 2010–2011 | (-) | (-) | 1 (0) | 3 (0) | 4 (0) | 0 |
| 45 | (Burkina Faso) Adama Guira | 2011–2013 | (-) | (-) | (-) | 4 (0) | 4 (0) | 0 |
| 45 | (Sweden) Osman Sow | 2011–2013 | (-) | (-) | (-) | 4 (1) | 4 (1) | 0.25 |
| 45 | (Nigeria) Jude Ogada | 2013–2015 | (-) | (-) | (-) | 4 (0) | 4 (0) | 0 |
| 45 | (Moldova) Marian Stoleru | 2013–2015 | (-) | (-) | (-) | 4 (1) | 4 (1) | 0.25 |
| 45 | (Ukraine) Evgeniy Lozoviy | 2015–2016 | (-) | (-) | (-) | 4 (1) | 4 (1) | 0.25 |
| 45 | (Moldova) Mihai Roșca | 2013–2016 | (-) | (-) | (-) | 4 (1) | 4 (1) | 0.25 |
| 45 | (Ukraine) Volodymyr Zastavnyi | 2014–2017 | (-) | (-) | (-) | 4 (0) | 4 (0) | 0 |
| 59 | (Moldova) Alexandru Chirilov | 2004; 2007–2008 | (-) | 3 (0) | (-) | (-) | 3 (0) | 0 |
| 59 | (Moldova) Valeriu Onila | 2003–2008 | 3 (2) | (-) | (-) | (-) | 3 (2) | 0.67 |
| 59 | (Moldova) Ștefan Caraulan | 2009–2011 | (-) | (-) | (-) | 3 (0) | 3 (0) | 0 |
| 59 | (Moldova) Nicolae Josan | 2012 | (-) | (-) | (-) | 3 (0) | 3 (0) | 0 |
| 59 | (Moldova) Eduard Grosu | 2012–2013 | (-) | (-) | (-) | 3 (0) | 3 (0) | 0 |
| 59 | (Ukraine) Maksym Lapushenko | 2011–2014 | (-) | (-) | (-) | 3 (0) | 3 (0) | 0 |
| 59 | (Moldova) Gheorghe Ovseanicov | 2013–2014 | (-) | (-) | (-) | 3 (0) | 3 (0) | 0 |
| 59 | (Cameroon) Alphonse Soppo | 2013–2015 | (-) | (-) | (-) | 3 (0) | 3 (0) | 0 |
| 59 | (Moldova) Viorel Frunză | 2006; 2015 | (-) | (-) | (-) | 3 (0) | 3 (0) | 0 |
| 68 | (Moldova) Lilian Coda | 2002–2003; 2004–2005 | 2 (0) | (-) | (-) | (-) | 2 (0) | 0 |
| 68 | (Moldova) Gheorghe Boghiu | 2005 | (-) | 2 (0) | (-) | (-) | 2 (0) | 0 |
| 68 | (Moldova) Ruslan Rascu | 2002–2006 | (-) | 2 (0) | (-) | (-) | 2 (0) | 0 |
| 68 | (Georgia (country)) Jaba Dvali | 2007–2009; 2014–2016 | (-) | 2 (0) | (-) | (-) | 2 (0) | 0 |
| 68 | (Georgia (country)) Sergi Orbeladze | 2008–2009 | (-) | 2 (0) | (-) | (-) | 2 (0) | 0 |
| 68 | (Moldova) Denis Romanenco | 2008–2009 | (-) | 2 (0) | (-) | (-) | 2 (0) | 0 |
| 68 | (Moldova) Eugeniu Buza | 2009–2010 | (-) | (-) | (-) | 2 (0) | 2 (0) | 0 |
| 68 | (Ukraine) Andriy Demchenko | 2009 | (-) | (-) | (-) | 2 (0) | 2 (0) | 0 |
| 68 | (Cameroon) Gock Habib | 2009–2010 | (-) | (-) | (-) | 2 (0) | 2 (0) | 0 |
| 68 | (Ghana) Eric Sackey | 2009–2013 | (-) | (-) | (-) | 2 (0) | 2 (0) | 0 |
| 68 | (Russia) Aleksei Trinitatskiy | 2008–2009 | (-) | (-) | (-) | 2 (0) | 2 (0) | 0 |
| 68 | (Ukraine) Oleksandr Zgura | 2009–2010 | (-) | (-) | (-) | 2 (0) | 2 (0) | 0 |
| 68 | (Moldova) Vasili Guchashvili | 2010–2012 | (-) | (-) | (-) | 2 (0) | 2 (0) | 0 |
| 68 | (Moldova) Oleg Molla | 2009–2010; 2010–2011; 2013 | (-) | (-) | (-) | 2 (0) | 2 (0) | 0 |
| 68 | (Moldova) Alexandru Dedov | 2010–2011 | (-) | (-) | 2 (0) | (-) | 2 (0) | 0 |
| 68 | (Russia) Aleksandr Nechayev | 2011 | (-) | (-) | 2 (0) | (-) | 2 (0) | 0 |
| 68 | (Montenegro) Janko Tumbasević | 2011–2013 | (-) | (-) | 2 (0) | (-) | 2 (0) | 0 |
| 68 | (Brazil) Cairo | 2012–2013 | (-) | (-) | (-) | 2 (0) | 2 (0) | 0 |
| 68 | (Brazil) Célio Santos | 2011–2012 | (-) | (-) | (-) | 2 (0) | 2 (0) | 0 |
| 68 | (Brazil) Lucas Tagliapietra | 2012–2013 | (-) | (-) | (-) | 2 (0) | 2 (0) | 0 |
| 68 | (North Macedonia) Ersen Sali | 2012 | (-) | (-) | (-) | 2 (0) | 2 (0) | 0 |
| 68 | (Nigeria) Henry Odia | 2013–2015 | (-) | (-) | (-) | 2 (0) | 2 (0) | 0 |
| 68 | (Moldova) Nicolae Orlovschi | 2013 | (-) | (-) | (-) | 2 (0) | 2 (0) | 0 |
| 68 | (Ukraine) Yuriy Shevel | 2013 | (-) | (-) | (-) | 2 (1) | 2 (1) | 0.5 |
| 68 | (Moldova) Vasile Jardan | 2012–2017 | (-) | (-) | (-) | 2 (1) | 2 (1) | 0.5 |
| 68 | (Ukraine) Vyacheslav Pidnebennoy | 2015 | (-) | (-) | (-) | 2 (0) | 2 (0) | 0 |
| 68 | (Moldova) Igor Bugaiov | 2016 | (-) | (-) | (-) | 2 (0) | 2 (0) | 0 |
| 68 | (Moldova) Andrei Bugneac | 2016 | (-) | (-) | (-) | 2 (0) | 2 (0) | 0 |
| 68 | (Moldova) Simeon Bulgaru | 2015–2017 | (-) | (-) | (-) | 2 (0) | 2 (0) | 0 |
| 68 | (Moldova) Dumitru Celeadnic | 2014–2017 | (-) | (-) | (-) | 2 (0) | 2 (0) | 0 |
| 68 | (Moldova) Maksym Feshchuk | 2016–2017 | (-) | (-) | (-) | 2 (0) | 2 (0) | 0 |
| 68 | (Ukraine) Denys Kozhanov | 2016 | (-) | (-) | (-) | 2 (0) | 2 (0) | 0 |
| 68 | (Ukraine) Andriy Slinkin | 2016 | (-) | (-) | (-) | 2 (0) | 2 (0) | 0 |
| 68 | (Ukraine) Rinar Valeyev | 2016 | (-) | (-) | (-) | 2 (0) | 2 (0) | 0 |
| 68 | (Angola) Amâncio Fortes | 2017–2018 | (-) | (-) | (-) | 2 (0) | 2 (0) | 0 |
| 68 | (Moldova) Oleg Andronic | 2017 | (-) | (-) | (-) | 2 (0) | 2 (0) | 0 |
| 68 | (Spain) Diego Seoane | 2017 | (-) | (-) | (-) | 2 (0) | 2 (0) | 0 |
| 68 | (Serbia) Stefan Drašković | 2017 | (-) | (-) | (-) | 2 (0) | 2 (0) | 0 |
| 68 | (Moldova) Cristin Jalbă | 2017 | (-) | (-) | (-) | 2 (0) | 2 (0) | 0 |
| 68 | (Moldova) Aleksandr Paşcenco | 2017 | (-) | (-) | (-) | 2 (0) | 2 (0) | 0 |
| 68 | (Serbia) Bratislav Punoševac | 2009–2010 | (-) | (-) | (-) | 2 (0) | 2 (0) | 0 |
| 68 | (Moldova) Dorian Railean | 2013–2017 | (-) | (-) | (-) | 2 (0) | 2 (0) | 0 |
| 110 | (Moldova) Andrei Chirsul | 2001–2003; 2004–2007 | (-) | 1 (0) | (-) | (-) | 1 (0) | 0 |
| 110 | (Moldova) Victor Comleonoc | 2005; 2012–2013 | (-) | 1 (0) | (-) | (-) | 1 (0) | 0 |
| 110 | (Bulgaria) Dimitar Belchev | 2007 | 1 (0) | (-) | (-) | (-) | 1 (0) | 0 |
| 110 | (Guinea-Bissau) Nimês Pina | 2006–2008 | 1 (0) | (-) | (-) | (-) | 1 (0) | 0 |
| 110 | (Moldova) Marcel Resitca | 2005–2008 | 1 (0) | (-) | (-) | (-) | 1 (0) | 0 |
| 110 | (Moldova) Ghenadie Moșneaga | 2009–2011; 2012; 2013–2014 | (-) | (-) | (-) | 1 (0) | 1 (0) | 0 |
| 110 | (Moldova) Nicolai Glega | 2010–2011 | (-) | (-) | (-) | 1 (0) | 1 (0) | 0 |
| 110 | (Cameroon) Claude Maka Kum | 2010 | (-) | (-) | (-) | 1 (0) | 1 (0) | 0 |
| 110 | (Serbia) Branislav Atanacković | 2011 | (-) | (-) | 1 (0) | (-) | 1 (0) | 0 |
| 110 | (Romania) Lucian Dobre | 2011 | (-) | (-) | 1 (0) | (-) | 1 (0) | 0 |
| 110 | (Moldova) Vasile Carauș | 2011–2013 | (-) | (-) | (-) | 1 (0) | 1 (0) | 0 |
| 110 | (Russia) Akhmet Barakhoyev | 2013–2015 | (-) | (-) | (-) | 1 (0) | 1 (0) | 0 |
| 110 | (Guinea) Ibrahima Camara | 2013–2015 | (-) | (-) | (-) | 1 (0) | 1 (0) | 0 |
| 110 | (Moldova) Sergiu Cojocari | 2015 | (-) | (-) | (-) | 1 (0) | 1 (0) | 0 |
| 110 | (Moldova) Petru Leucă | 2014–2015 | (-) | (-) | (-) | 1 (1) | 1 (1) | 1 |
| 110 | (Ukraine) Serhiy Zahynaylov | 2015–2016 | (-) | (-) | (-) | 1 (0) | 1 (0) | 0 |
| 110 | (Moldova) Maxim Cojocaru | 2016–2018 | (-) | (-) | (-) | 1 (0) | 1 (0) | 0 |
| 110 | (France) Cheikh-Alan Diarra | 2016–2017 | (-) | (-) | (-) | 1 (0) | 1 (0) | 0 |
| 110 | (Moldova) Andrei Marandici | 2017 | (-) | (-) | (-) | 1 (0) | 1 (0) | 0 |
| 110 | (Moldova) Zaurbek Olisayev | 2017 | (-) | (-) | (-) | 1 (0) | 1 (0) | 0 |

=== Goalscorers ===
As of match played 6 July 2017

| | Name | Years | UEFA Intertoto Cup | UEFA Cup | UEFA Champions League | UEFA Europa League | Total | Ratio |
|---|---|---|---|---|---|---|---|---|
| 1 | (Moldova) Ghenadie Orbu | 2001–2015 | 1 (8) | 0 (4) | 1 (2) | 2 (11) | 4 (25) | 0.16 |
| 2 | (Moldova) Alexandru Golban | 2000–2003 | 3 (6) | (-) | (-) | (-) | 3 (6) | 0.5 |
| 2 | (Russia) Vasili Pavlov | 2011–2013; 2015 | (-) | (-) | 0 (1) | 3 (8) | 3 (9) | 0.33 |
| 2 | (Moldova) Maxim Mihaliov | 2011–2014; 2015–2016 | (-) | (-) | 0 (2) | 3 (12) | 3 (14) | 0.21 |
| 5 | (Moldova) Denis Orbu | 2002–2007 | 2 (3) | 0 (1) | (-) | (-) | 2 (4) | 0.5 |
| 5 | (Moldova) Valeriu Onila | 2003–2008 | 2 (3) | (-) | (-) | (-) | 2 (3) | 0.67 |
| 5 | (Moldova) Vladimir Jăpălău | 2001–2007 | 1 (6) | 1 (2) | (-) | (-) | 2 (8) | 0.25 |
| 5 | (Moldova) Eugeniu Cociuc | 2012–2016 | (-) | (-) | (-) | 2 (8) | 2 (8) | 0.25 |
| 9 | (Moldova) Sergiu Jăpălău | 2002–2005; 2008–2009 | 1 (6) | 0 (4) | (-) | (-) | 1 (10) | 0.1 |
| 9 | (Moldova) Andrei Martin | 2002–2005; 2005–2009 | 1 (11) | 0 (1) | (-) | (-) | 1 (12) | 0.08 |
| 9 | (Moldova) Grigore Badea | 2003–2004 | 1 (6) | (–) | (-) | (-) | 1 (6) | 0.17 |
| 9 | (Moldova) Liviu Andriuță | 2002–2007 | 1 (6) | 0 (2) | 0 (0) | 0 (0) | 1 (8) | 0.13 |
| 9 | (Moldova) Dumitru Alin Lipa | 2007–2008 | 1 (6) | (-) | (-) | (-) | 1 (6) | 0.17 |
| 9 | (Moldova) Eugeniu Boicenco | 2007; 2008–2009 | 1 (5) | 0 (2) | (-) | (-) | 1 (7) | 0.14 |
| 9 | (Moldova) Victor Bulat | 2008–2010 | (-) | 1 (2) | (-) | 0 (4) | 1 (6) | 0.17 |
| 9 | (Georgia (country)) Levan Korgalidze | 2008–2009; 2010–2011 | (-) | 1 (2) | (-) | 0 (4) | 1 (6) | 0.17 |
| 9 | (Moldova) Dumitru Popovici | 2009–2013 | (-) | (-) | 1 (1) | 0 (7) | 1 (8) | 0.13 |
| 9 | (Sweden) Osman Sow | 2012–2013 | (-) | (-) | (-) | 1 (4) | 1 (4) | 0.25 |
| 9 | (Moldova) Marian Stoleru | 2013–2015 | (-) | (-) | (-) | 1 (4) | 1 (4) | 0.25 |
| 9 | (Moldova) Nicolae Orlovschi | 2013–2014 | (-) | (-) | (-) | 1 (2) | 1 (2) | 0.5 |
| 9 | (Moldova) Mihai Roșca | 2013–2016 | (-) | (-) | (-) | 1 (4) | 1 (4) | 0.25 |
| 9 | (Moldova) Vasile Jardan | 2012–2017 | (-) | (-) | (-) | 1 (2) | 1 (2) | 0 |
| 9 | (Ukraine) Evgeniy Lozoviy | 2015–2016 | (-) | (-) | (-) | 1 (4) | 1 (4) | 0.25 |
| 9 | (Moldova) Petru Leucă | 2014–2015 | (-) | (-) | (-) | 1 (1) | 1 (1) | 1 |

=== Clean sheets ===
As of match played 6 July 2017

| | Name | Years | UEFA Intertoto Cup | UEFA Cup | UEFA Champions League | UEFA Europa League | Total | Ratio |
|---|---|---|---|---|---|---|---|---|
| 1 | (Moldova) Eugen Matiughin | 2009–2014 | (-) | (-) | (-) | 6 (11) | 5 (11) | 0.45 |
| 2 | (Moldova) Artiom Gaiduchevici | 2011–2013 | (-) | (-) | 1 (2) | 2 (6) | 3 (8) | 0.38 |
| 3 | (Moldova) Alexandru Mereuta | 2002–2003 | 2 (6) | (-) | (-) | (-) | 2 (6) | 0.33 |
| 4 | (Moldova) Alexandru Chirilov | 2004; 2007–2008 | (-) | 1 (3) | (-) | (-) | 1 (3) | 0.33 |
| 4 | (Moldova) Mihail Moraru | 2002–2008 | 1 (6) | (-) | (-) | (-) | 1 (6) | 0.17 |
| 4 | (Moldova) Dumitru Celeadnic | 2014–2017 | (-) | (-) | (-) | 1 (2) | 1 (2) | 0.5 |
| 7 | (Moldova) Denis Romanenco | 2008–2009 | (-) | 0 (2) | (-) | (-) | 0 (2) | 0 |
| 7 | (Moldova) Ghenadie Moșneaga | 2009–2011; 2012; 2013–2014 | (-) | (-) | (-) | 0 (1) | 0 (1) | 0 |
| 7 | (Moldova) Dorian Railean | 2013–2017 | (-) | (-) | (-) | 0 (2) | 0 (2) | 0 |

== Overall record ==
=== By competition ===
As of match played 6 July 2017

| Competition | Pld | W | D | L | GF | GA | GD |
|---|---|---|---|---|---|---|---|
| UEFA Champions League | 2 | 1 | 0 | 1 | 2 | 3 | –1 |
| UEFA Cup/Europa League | 26 | 8 | 5 | 13 | 20 | 35 | -15 |
| UEFA Intertoto Cup | 12 | 5 | 3 | 4 | 15 | 12 | +3 |
| Total | 40 | 14 | 8 | 18 | 37 | 50 | -13 |

=== By country ===
As of match played 6 July 2017

| Country | Pld | W | D | L | GF | GA | GD | Win% |
|---|---|---|---|---|---|---|---|---|
| Albania | 4 | 3 | 0 | 1 | 8 | 3 | +5 | 75.00 |
| Azerbaijan | 4 | 0 | 3 | 1 | 1 | 2 | −1 | 0.00 |
| Faroe Islands | 2 | 2 | 0 | 0 | 5 | 1 | +4 | 100.00 |
| Georgia | 2 | 1 | 0 | 1 | 2 | 3 | −1 | 50.00 |
| Germany | 4 | 0 | 1 | 3 | 2 | 8 | −6 | 0.00 |
| Liechtenstein | 2 | 1 | 0 | 1 | 1 | 3 | −2 | 50.00 |
| Montenegro | 2 | 0 | 2 | 0 | 1 | 1 | +0 | 0.00 |
| North Macedonia | 4 | 2 | 0 | 2 | 5 | 8 | −3 | 50.00 |
| Serbia | 2 | 0 | 1 | 1 | 2 | 4 | −2 | 0.00 |
| Slovakia | 4 | 0 | 0 | 4 | 3 | 10 | −7 | 0.00 |
| Slovenia | 2 | 2 | 0 | 0 | 2 | 0 | +2 | 100.00 |
| Sweden | 4 | 1 | 1 | 2 | 1 | 4 | −3 | 25.00 |
| Switzerland | 2 | 1 | 0 | 1 | 1 | 1 | +0 | 50.00 |
| Ukraine | 2 | 1 | 0 | 1 | 2 | 3 | −1 | 50.00 |

=== By club ===
As of match played 6 July 2017

| Opponent | Played | Won | Drawn | Lost | For | Against | Difference | Ratio |
|---|---|---|---|---|---|---|---|---|
| (Albania) Partizani Tirana | 2 | 2 | 0 | 0 | 5 | 0 | +5 | 100.00 |
| (Albania) Teuta Durrës | 2 | 1 | 0 | 1 | 3 | 3 | +0 | 50.00 |
| (Azerbaijan) Baku | 2 | 0 | 2 | 0 | 1 | 1 | +0 | 0.00 |
| (Azerbaijan) Kapaz | 2 | 0 | 1 | 1 | 0 | 1 | −1 | 0.00 |
| (Faroe Islands) GÍ | 2 | 2 | 0 | 0 | 5 | 1 | +4 | 100.00 |
| (Georgia (country)) Zestaponi | 2 | 1 | 0 | 1 | 2 | 3 | −1 | 50.00 |
| (Germany) Hamburg | 2 | 0 | 1 | 1 | 1 | 5 | −4 | 0.00 |
| (Germany) Schalke 04 | 2 | 0 | 0 | 2 | 1 | 3 | −2 | 0.00 |
| (Liechtenstein) Vaduz | 2 | 1 | 0 | 1 | 1 | 2 | −1 | 50.00 |
| (Montenegro) Zeta | 2 | 0 | 2 | 0 | 1 | 1 | +0 | 0.00 |
| (North Macedonia) Renova | 2 | 2 | 0 | 0 | 5 | 1 | +4 | 100.00 |
| (North Macedonia) Shkëndija | 2 | 0 | 0 | 2 | 0 | 7 | −7 | 0.00 |
| (Serbia) Borac Čačak | 2 | 0 | 1 | 1 | 2 | 4 | −2 | 0.00 |
| (Slovakia) MŠK Žilina | 4 | 0 | 0 | 4 | 3 | 10 | −7 | 0.00 |
| (Slovenia) Celje | 2 | 2 | 0 | 0 | 2 | 0 | +2 | 100.00 |
| (Switzerland) St. Gallen | 2 | 1 | 0 | 1 | 1 | 1 | +0 | 50.00 |
| (Sweden) Elfsborg | 2 | 1 | 0 | 1 | 1 | 2 | −1 | 50.00 |
| (Sweden) Kalmar | 2 | 0 | 1 | 1 | 0 | 2 | −2 | 0.00 |
| (Ukraine) Chornomorets Odesa | 2 | 1 | 0 | 1 | 2 | 3 | −1 | 50.00 |
