= 2009–10 Moldovan National Division =

Football season in Moldova

Moldovan National Division
- Season: 2009–10
- Champions: Sheriff Tiraspol
- Champions League: Sheriff Tiraspol
- Europa League: Iskra-Stal Rîbnița; Olimpia Bălți; Dacia Chișinău
- Matches: 198
- Goals: 477 (2.41 per match)
- Top goalscorer: Alexandru Maximov; Jymmy França (13 goals)
- Biggest home win: CSCA-Rapid 6–0 Nistru Otaci
- Biggest away win: Sfîntul Gheorghe 0–7 Viitorul Orhei
- Highest scoring: Dinamo Bender 5–3 Sfîntul Gheorghe
- Average attendance: 872

The 2009–10 Moldovan National Division (Romanian: Divizia Națională) was the 19th season of top-tier football in Moldova. The season began on 5 July 2008, with the final round of matches played on 16 May 2009. Sheriff Tiraspol retained their title as defending champions.

== Team changes ==
On 6 June 2009, Tiligul-Tiras Tiraspol announced that the club would dissolve, citing a lack of funds as the reason. As a consequence, Academia Chișinău were spared from relegation. The 2008–09 season had already been absolved with only eleven teams after FC Politehnica Chișinău withdrew their participation just days before the scheduled start.

The two vacant league spots were filled with 2008–09 Moldovan "A" Division champions Viitorul Orhei and 11th-placed Sfîntul Gheorghe, who bought their way into the top level.

== Stadia and locations ==
Location of teams in National Division 2009–10

| Club | Location | Stadium | Capacity |
|---|---|---|---|
| FC Academia UTM | Chișinău | Dinamo Stadium (Chișinău) | 2,692 |
| CSCA-Rapid Chișinău | Ghidighici | Ghidighici Stadium | 784 |
| FC Dacia | Chișinău | Dinamo Stadium (Chișinău) | 2,692 |
| FC Dinamo | Bender | Dinamo Stadium (Bender) | 5,061 |
| FC Iskra-Stal | Rîbnița | Orăşănesc Stadium | 4,500 |
| FC Nistru | Otaci | Călărăseuca Stadium | 2,000 |
| FC Olimpia | Bălți | Olimpia Bălți Stadium | 5,953 |
| FC Sfintul Gheorghe | Suruceni | Suruceni Stadium | 2,000 |
| FC Sheriff | Tiraspol | Sheriff Stadium | 13,460 |
| FC Tiraspol | Tiraspol | Sheriff Stadium | 13,460 |
| FC Viitorul | Orhei | CSR Orhei | 2,539 |
| FC Zimbru | Chișinău | Zimbru Stadium | 10,600 |

== Managers and captains ==
| Club | Coach | Captain | Replaced coach(es) |
|---|---|---|---|
| FC Academia UTM | Igor Dobrovolskiy | Eugeniu Gorceac | |
| CSCA-Rapid Chișinău | Eugen Marcoci | | |
| FC Dacia | Veaceslav Semionov | | |
| FC Dinamo | Iuri Hodichin | | |
| FC Iskra-Stal | Vlad Goian | | |
| FC Nistru | Lilian Popescu | | |
| FC Olimpia | Mykhailo Dunets | | |
| FC Sfintul Gheorghe | Sergiu Caraman | Vitalie Plămădeală | |
| FC Sheriff | Andrei Sasnitski | Vazha Tarkhnishvili | Leonid Koutchouk |
| FC Tiraspol | Yuri Blonar | | |
| FC Viitorul | Vladimir Gherasimov | | |
| FC Zimbru | Ivan Tabanov | | |

== League table ==
| Pos | Team | Pld | W | D | L | GF | GA | GD | Pts | Qualification or relegation |
|---|---|---|---|---|---|---|---|---|---|---|
| 1 | Sheriff Tiraspol (C) | 33 | 27 | 3 | 3 | 75 | 8 | +67 | 84 | Qualification for the Champions League second qualifying round |
| 2 | Iskra-Stal Rîbnița | 33 | 19 | 8 | 6 | 50 | 25 | +25 | 65 | Qualification for the Europa League second qualifying round (Note: Since Sheriff, winners of the 2009–10 Moldovan Cup, also won the league, Dacia will enter the first and Iskra-Stal the second qualifying round of the UEFA Europa League.) |
| 3 | Olimpia Bălți | 33 | 17 | 9 | 7 | 45 | 23 | +22 | 60 | Qualification for the Europa League first qualifying round |
| 4 | Zimbru Chișinău | 33 | 17 | 8 | 8 | 47 | 29 | +18 | 59 | |
| 5 | Dacia Chișinău | 33 | 16 | 10 | 7 | 54 | 30 | +24 | 58 | Qualification for the Europa League first qualifying round |
| 6 | CSCA-Rapid Chișinău | 33 | 12 | 9 | 12 | 40 | 39 | +1 | 45 | |
| 7 | Academia Chișinău | 33 | 11 | 9 | 13 | 36 | 37 | −1 | 42 | |
| 8 | Viitorul Orhei | 33 | 10 | 6 | 17 | 32 | 45 | −13 | 36 | |
| 9 | Tiraspol | 33 | 8 | 10 | 15 | 20 | 34 | −14 | 34 | |
| 10 | Dinamo Bender | 33 | 9 | 5 | 19 | 36 | 66 | −30 | 32 | |
| 11 | Sfîntul Gheorghe | 33 | 6 | 6 | 21 | 29 | 67 | −38 | 24 | |
| 12 | Nistru Otaci | 33 | 2 | 5 | 26 | 13 | 74 | −61 | 11 | |

Source: Moldovan Football Federation (in Romanian)
Rules for classification: 1st points; 2nd head-to-head points; 3rd head-to-head goal difference; 4th goal difference; 5th goals scored; 6th number of wins; 7th Fair play competition
(C) Champions

== Results ==
The schedule consists of three rounds. During the first two rounds, each team played each other once home and away for a total of 22 matches. The pairings of the third round were then set according to the standings after the first two rounds, giving every team a third game against each opponent for a total of 33 games per team.

Official schedule(in Romanian)

=== First and second round ===
| Home \ Away | ACA | CRC | DAC | DIN | ISK | NIS | OLI | SFÎ | SHE | TIR | VIT | ZIM |
|---|---|---|---|---|---|---|---|---|---|---|---|---|
| Academia Chișinău | | 0–1 | 1–1 | 1–1 | 1–1 | 1–0 | 2–1 | 3–0 | 0–0 | 1–1 | 0–2 | 2–2 |
| CSCA-Rapid Chișinău | 4–1 | | 0–2 | 2–1 | 0–2 | 1–0 | 0–0 | 1–1 | 0–6 | 1–2 | 1–0 | 0–1 |
| Dacia Chișinău | 1–0 | 4–0 | | 3–2 | 1–2 | 1–1 | 1–1 | 1–0 | 1–2 | 1–0 | 2–0 | 1–0 |
| Dinamo Bender | 1–4 | 2–1 | 2–3 | | 2–1 | 1–2 | 1–1 | 0–2 | 0–5 | 2–1 | 1–0 | 3–1 |
| Iskra-Stal Rîbnița | 2–0 | 5–0 | 3–1 | 2–0 | | 2–1 | 1–1 | 1–0 | 0–1 | 1–0 | 1–0 | 1–1 |
| Nistru Otaci | 1–2 | 0–0 | 0–6 | 0–1 | 1–2 | | 0–6 | 2–0 | 0–1 | 1–1 | 0–2 | 0–0 |
| Olimpia Bălți | 2–2 | 0–2 | 0–1 | 3–1 | 0–1 | 3–0 | | 4–2 | 1–0 | 1–0 | 1–0 | 0–0 |
| Sfîntul Gheorghe | 1–3 | 0–3 | 0–0 | 2–1 | 0–1 | 3–0 (Note: The match originally finished 0-0, but was declared 3-0 due to Nistru's financial difficulties.) | 0–0 | | 2–5 | 2–0 | 0–7 | 0–1 |
| Sheriff Tiraspol | 1–0 | 1–0 | 0–0 | 5–0 | 5–0 | 5–0 | 2–0 | 2–0 | | 2–0 | 3–0 | 3–0 |
| Tiraspol | 1–1 | 0–0 | 0–3 | 4–1 | 0–0 | 1–0 | 0–1 | 2–0 | 1–0 | | 0–0 | 1–0 |
| Viitorul Orhei | 2–0 | 2–2 | 1–5 | 3–2 | 0–3 | 0–0 | 0–1 | 1–0 | 0–3 | 1–0 | | 0–3 |
| Zimbru Chișinău | 4–1 | 0–1 | 2–1 | 3–1 | 3–1 | 4–1 | 1–4 | 2–1 | 1–0 | 1–1 | 1–1 | |

Source: Moldovan Football Federation (in Romanian)
Legend: Blue = home team win; Yellow = draw; Red = away team win.

=== Third round ===
Key numbers for pairing determination:

| 23rd round | 24th round | 25th round | 26th round | 27th round | 28th round |
|---|---|---|---|---|---|
| 1 - 12 | 1 - 2 | 2 - 12 | 1 - 4 | 3 - 12 | 1 - 6 |
| 2 - 11 | 8 - 6 | 3 - 1 | 2 - 3 | 4 - 2 | 2 - 5 |
| 3 - 10 | 9 - 5 | 4 - 11 | 9 - 7 | 5 - 1 | 3 - 4 |
| 4 - 9 | 10 - 4 | 5 - 10 | 10 - 6 | 6 - 11 | 10 - 8 |
| 5 - 8 | 11 - 3 | 6 - 9 | 11 - 5 | 7 - 10 | 11 - 7 |
| 6 - 7 | 12 - 7 | 7 - 8 | 12 - 8 | 8 - 9 | 12 - 9 |

| 29th round | 30th round | 31st round | 32nd round | 33rd round |
|---|---|---|---|---|
| 4 - 12 | 1 - 8 | 5 - 12 | 1 - 10 | 6 - 12 |
| 5 - 3 | 2 - 7 | 6 - 4 | 2 - 9 | 7 - 5 |
| 6 - 2 | 3 - 6 | 7 - 3 | 3 - 8 | 8 - 4 |
| 7 - 1 | 4 - 5 | 8 - 2 | 4 - 7 | 9 - 3 |
| 8 - 11 | 11 - 9 | 9 - 1 | 5 - 6 | 10 - 2 |
| 9 - 10 | 12 - 10 | 10 - 11 | 12 - 11 | 11 - 1 |

| Home \ Away | ACA | CRC | DAC | DIN | ISK | NIS | OLI | SFÎ | SHE | TIR | VIT | ZIM |
|---|---|---|---|---|---|---|---|---|---|---|---|---|
| Academia Chișinău | | | 3–1 | 1–0 | | | | | 0–1 | | 3–0 | 0–2 |
| CSCA-Rapid Chișinău | 0–1 | | | | 0–0 | 6–0 | 0–0 | 2–0 | | 4–1 | | |
| Dacia Chișinău | | 2–2 | | 0–0 | | 3–0 | 2–4 | | 0–0 | | 2–1 | |
| Dinamo Bender | | 0–4 | | | 1–1 | | 0–0 | 5–3 | | | 1–0 | |
| Iskra-Stal Rîbnița | 1–0 | | 0–0 | | | 3–0 | | 5–0 | | 3–0 | | 0–0 |
| Nistru Otaci | 0–2 | | | 1–3 | | | | 1–3 | | 0–1 | 0–1 | |
| Olimpia Bălți | 1–0 | | | | 2–1 | 3–0 | | 2–0 | | 1–0 | | 1–0 |
| Sfîntul Gheorghe | 1–0 | | 2–2 | | | | | | 0–2 | 0–0 | | 1–5 |
| Sheriff Tiraspol | | 3–1 | | 3–0 | 3–0 | 4–0 | 1–0 | | | | 3–1 | |
| Tiraspol | 0–0 | | 0–2 | 2–0 | | | | | 0–2 | | | 0–2 |
| Viitorul Orhei | | 1–0 | | | 1–3 | | 2–0 | 3–3 | | 0–0 | | |
| Zimbru Chișinău | | 1–1 | 1–0 | 2–0 | | 2–1 | | | 0–1 | | 1–0 | |

Source: Moldovan Football Federation (in Romanian)
Legend: Blue = home team win; Yellow = draw; Red = away team win.

== Top goalscorers ==
| Rank | Player | Club | Goals |
|---|---|---|---|
| 1 | (Moldova) Alexandru Maximov | Viitorul Orhei | 13 |
| 1 | (Brazil) Jymmy França | Sheriff Tiraspol | 13 |
| 3 | (Ukraine) Oleksandr Zgura | Dacia Chișinău | 12 |
| 4 | (Russia) Alexandr Erokhin | Sheriff Tiraspol | 11 |
| 5 | (Russia) Daniil Nikolaev | Academia Chișinău | 10 |
| 6 | (Moldova) Gheorghe Ovseannicov | Olimpia Bălți | 9 |
| 6 | (Ghana) Eric Sackey | Dacia Chișinău | 9 |
| 6 | (Moldova) Alexandru Popovici | Iskra-Stal Rîbnița | 9 |
| 6 | (Moldova) Nicolai Rudac | Iskra-Stal Rîbnița | 9 |
| 6 | (Montenegro) Vladimir Volkov | Sheriff Tiraspol | 9 |

=== Hat-tricks ===
Key
| ^{4} | Player scored four goals |
| ^{5} | Player scored five goals |

| Player | Home | Away | Result | Date |
|---|---|---|---|---|
| (Russia) Alexandr Erokhin | CSCA-Rapid Chișinău | Sheriff Tiraspol | 0–6 | 10 July 2009 |
| (Moldova) Gheorghe Ovseannicov | Nistru Otaci | Olimpia Bălți | 0–6 | 11 July 2009 |
| (Belarus) Aliaksei Kuchuk | Sheriff Tiraspol | Dinamo Bender | 5–0 | 7 September 2009 |
| (Ghana) Eric Sackey | Viitorul Orhei | Dacia Chișinău | 1–5 | 29 July 2009 |
| (Ghana) Eric Sackey^{4} | Dacia Chișinău | CSCA-Rapid Chișinău | 4–0 | 9 August 2009 |
| (Moldova) Gheorghe Ovseannicov | Zimbru Chișinău | Olimpia Bălți | 1–4 | 18 October 2009 |
| (Moldova) Alexandru Cucu | Sfîntul Gheorghe | Viitorul Orhei | 0–7 | 17 March 2010 |
| (Montenegro) Vladimir Volkov | Sheriff Tiraspol | Nistru Otaci | 5–0 | 17 March 2010 |
| (Brazil) Jymmy Dougllas França | Sheriff Tiraspol | Nistru Otaci | 4–0 | 10 March 2010 |

=== Clean sheets ===
| Rank | Player | Club | Clean sheets |
|---|---|---|---|
| 1 | (Moldova) Artiom Gaiduchevici | Iskra-Stal Rîbnița | 16 |
| 2 | (Moldova) Ghenadie Moşneaga | Dacia Chișinău | 13 |
| 3 | (Moldova) Mihail Păiuş | Olimpia Bălți | 10 |
| 4 | (Moldova) Alexandru Melenciuc | Sheriff Tiraspol | 9 |
| 4 | (Moldova) Alexandru Chirilov | CSCA-Rapid Chișinău | 9 |
| 4 | (Moldova) Nicolae Calancea | Zimbru Chișinău | 9 |
| 4 | (Bulgaria) Vladislav Stoyanov | Sheriff Tiraspol | 9 |
| 8 | (Ukraine) Mykola Zbarakh | Olimpia Bălți | 8 |
| 8 | (Moldova) Sergiu Juric | FC Tiraspol | 8 |
| 10 | (Moldova) Eugen Matiughin | Dacia Chișinău | 6 |

== Disciplinary ==
| Rank | Player | Club | Yellow Cards | Red Cards | Points |
|---|---|---|---|---|---|
| 1 | (Moldova) Dumitru Bogdan | Sfîntul Gheorghe | 12 | 1 | 15 |
| 2 | (Moldova) Oleg Şişchin | Zimbru Chișinău | 8 | 2 | 14 |
| 3 | (Guinea) Djibril Paye | FC Tiraspol | 9 | 1 | 12 |

== See also ==
- 2009–10 FC Academia UTM season
- 2009–10 FC Dacia season
- 2009–10 FC Dinamo Bender season
- 2009–10 FC Sheriff season
- 2009–10 FC Tiraspol season
- 2009–10 FC Viitorul Orhei season
- 2009–10 FC Zimbru Chișinău season
