= 2009–10 FC Tiraspol season =

Tiraspol
2009–10 Moldovan National Division season
- Chairman: Victor Tulba
- Manager: Yuri Blonar
- Moldovan National Division: 9th
- Moldovan Cup: Round of 8

2009–10 Moldovan National Division season is the 16th Moldovan National Division season in the history of FC Tiraspol.

== Current squad ==
Squad given according to the official website as of June 6, 2010

Note: Flags indicate national team as defined under FIFA eligibility rules; some limited exceptions apply. Players may hold more than one non-FIFA nationality.

No.	Pos.	Nation	Player
1	GK	MDA	Sergiu Juric
12	GK	MDA	Alexandr Zviaghintev
3	DF	MDA	Dumitru Nicolov
6	DF	MDA	Dumitru Condariuc
7	DF	MDA	Oleg Iastrebov
13	DF	MDA	Pailler Tasimir Djibril
16	DF	MDA	Maxim Alacev
23	DF	MDA	Andrei Radiola
24	DF	MDA	Eugen Celiadchin
4	MF	MDA	Nelson Fred de Olivera
5	MF	MDA	Iurii Sinitchih
10	MF	MDA	Anatol Cheptine
11	MF	MDA	Gheorghe Nicologlo

No.	Pos.	Nation	Player
15	MF	MDA	Andrei Verbetchi
21	MF	MDA	Vitalii Iezhov
21	MF	MDA	Vitalii Ejov
22	MF	MDA	Victor Truhanov
8	FW	MDA	Dmitri Vornisel
9	FW	MDA	Alexei Procopiev
18	FW	MDA	Igor Bridnea
19	FW	MDA	Iurii Bondarciuc
20	FW	MDA	Andrei Porfireanu
7	FW	MDA	Alexandr Pascenco
8	DF	MDA	Kiril Sidorenco
12	DF	MDA	Oleg Tugulea
15	FW	MDA	Ilya Soshnin
18	DF	MDA	Artjoms Osipov

== National Division results ==
Pos	Team	Pld	W	D	L	GF	GA	GD	Pts
8	Viitorul Orhei	33	10	6	17	32	45	−13	36
9	Tiraspol	33	8	10	15	20	34	−14	34
10	Dinamo Bender	33	9	5	19	36	66	−30	32

Source: Moldovan Football Federation (in Romanian)
Rules for classification: 1st points; 2nd head-to-head points; 3rd head-to-head goal difference; 4th goal difference; 5th goals scored; 6th number of wins; 7th Fair play competition
