= Milești =

Mileşti may refer to several villages in Romania:

- Mileşti, a village in Șimnicu de Sus Commune, Dolj County
- Mileşti, a village in Făurești Commune, Vâlcea County
- Mileştii de Sus and Mileştii de Jos, villages in Parincea Commune, Bacău County

and a village in Moldova:

- Mileşti, a commune in Nisporeni district
