= Alexandru Maximov =

Moldovan footballer

Personal information
- Date of birth: 8 July 1982 (age 44)
- Place of birth: Moldovan SSR (now Moldova)
- Height: 1.76 m (5 ft 9 in)
- Position: Forward

Senior career*
Years	Team	Apps	(Gls)
2003–2004	Tiligul-Tiras Tiraspol	21	(1)
2007	Rapid Ghidighici	1	(0)
2008–2010	Milsami Orhei	29	(13)
2010	FC Okzhetpes	4	(0)
2010–2011	Rapid Ghidighici	10	(1)
2011	Impuls FC	2	(0)
2011–2012	FC Costuleni	4	(0)
2012–	CF Găgăuzia	?	(?)
- * Club domestic league appearances and goals as of 15/09/2014

Alexandru Maximov (born 8 July 1982) is a Moldovan footballer who plays as forward.

== Honours ==
=== Individual ===
Milsami Orhei

- Moldovan National Division Top scorer: 2009–10 (13 goals; joint with Jymmy França)
