= Petru Leuca =

Moldovan footballer

Personal information
- Full name: Petru Leuca
- Date of birth: 19 July 1990 (age 36)
- Place of birth: Chișinău, Moldavian SSR
- Height: 1.93 m (6 ft 4 in)
- Position: Forward

Team information
- Current team: Zimbru Chișinău
- Number: 29

Senior career*
Years	Team	Apps	(Gls)
2007–2008	Beșiktaș Chișinău	16	(7)
2008–2011	Academia Chişinău	102	(36)
2011	→ Oleksandriya (loan)	0	(0)
2012	Milsami	19	(3)
2013	Iskra-Stal Rîbniţa	19	(5)
2013–2014	Milsami	27	(12)
2014–2015	Dacia Chişinău	24	(12)
2017	Ungheni	11	(4)
2017	Jonava	1	(0)
2017–2018	Petrocub Hîncești	4	(1)
2018	Khaitan	23	(7)
2018–2019	Diagoras	14	(6)
2019	AC Vigasio	14	(6)
2020	TRAU	2	(0)
2020–2021	Dinamo-Auto	5	(1)
2021–2022	Nagaworld	17	(5)
2022	Samut Prakan City	13	(2)
2023	Zimbru Chișinău	3	(0)
2023–	ASD Akragas 2018	11	(4)
2024	F.C Santegidiese	9	(2)
2024/25	F.C Asta Taverne	7	(2)
2025	Jonica FC	10	(3)
2025	CSF Spartanii Sportul	7	(2)

International career
2005	Moldova U16	7	(3)
2006	Moldova U17	5	(1)
2008	Moldova U19	4	(2)
2009–2011	Moldova U21	6	(3)
2015–	Moldova	1	(0)
- * Club domestic league appearances and goals

Petru Leuca (born 19 July 1990) is a Moldovan professional footballer who plays as a forward for Zimbru Chișinău.

== Career ==
One of Moldova's top young prospects, Leuca was a leading figure in the Moldovan top-flight, the Divizia Nationala, for the first six years of his career, before being signed overseas. He ventured abroad playing in various countries including Lithuania, Greece and India, however, his stay at these clubs were short-lived due to the coronavirus pandemic, which cut short their league campaigns.

A notable marquee signing in both Kuwait and Oman, Leuca subsequently attracted interest from Asian clubs including Chonburi and Persebaya, before starring for Nagaworld in Cambodia, scoring eight times.

== International career ==
After featuring for Moldova at all age-group levels, he made his debut for the Moldova senior national team on 14 February 2015 in a friendly vs Romania in Aksu, Kazakhstan. He has been called up to the senior side a total of 12 times against opposition including Kazakhstan, Montenegro, Azerbaijan and Albania, however, his debut against Romania remains his only appearance.

== Personal life ==
His father, Petru Leuca Sr., is a current Mayor of Milești, Nisporeni.
