= Anatolie Boeștean =

Moldovan footballer

Personal information
- Full name: Anatolie Boeștean
- Date of birth: 26 March 1985 (age 41)
- Place of birth: Moldova
- Height: 1.80 m (5 ft 11 in)
- Position: Defender

Team information
- Current team: Zimbru Chișinău
- Number: 4

Senior career*
Years	Team	Apps	(Gls)
2007–2009	FC Rapid Ghidighici	51	(1)
2009–2010	Dacia Chișinău	16	(3)
2010–2011	FC Rapid Ghidighici	13	(0)
2011	CSMS Iași	7	(0)
2012–2014	FC Tiraspol	50	(0)
2015–	Zimbru Chișinău	1	(0)

International career
	Moldova-17	4	(0)
	Moldova-19	2	(0)
- * Club domestic league appearances and goals

Anatolie Boeştean (born 26 March 1985) is a Moldovan football player who currently is playing for Zimbru Chișinău.
