= Artiom Gaiduchevici =

Moldovan association footballer (born 1987)

Personal information
- Full name: Artiom Gaiduchevici
- Date of birth: 22 April 1987 (age 39)
- Place of birth: Vladikavkaz, Soviet Union
- Height: 6 ft 0 in (1.83 m)
- Position: Goalkeeper

Senior career*
Years	Team	Apps	(Gls)
2005–2006	FC Zimbru Chişinău	2	(0)
2007–2011	FC Iskra-Stal	87	(0)
2011–2013	FC Dacia Chişinău	23	(0)
2013–2014	FC Veris	24	(0)
2014–2016	FC Dacia Chişinău	33	(0)

International career
2010–2016	Moldova	8	(0)
- * Club domestic league appearances and goals

Artiom Gaiduchevici (born 22 April 1987) is a Moldovan former association footballer who played as a goalkeeper. Gaiduchevici has played for three clubs in Moldova as well as being capped by the Moldova national football team on six occasions. He has been described as Moldova's "most promising young goalkeeper". In December 2011, Gaiduchevici was also voted Moldova's best goalkeeper of 2011.

== Club career ==
=== Zimbru Chisinau ===
Artiom began his career at Zimbru Chisinau in the 2005–06 season. Zimbru finished in second place in the Moldovan National Division in his first season in senior football, with Gaiduchevici playing in two of their twenty-eight league games. This lack of first-team action prompted the goalkeeper to move to FC Iskra-Stal, who had just been promoted from the Moldovan "A" Division. Gaiduchevici hoped that he would stand a better chance of becoming the club's first-choice goalkeeper than at Zimbru.

=== FC Iskra-Stal ===
FC Iskra-Stal finished in ninth place in the Moldovan National Division in 2006–07 season, but Gaiduchevici played a peripheral role. He made more of an impact in his second season at Iskra-Stal, 2007–08, making twelve appearances as the club finished in an improved sixth place. In 2008–09 both Gaiduchevici and Iskra-Stal improved again, with the goalkeeper playing in twenty-three of their thirty league games and cementing his place at the club's first choice goalkeeper. Iskra-Stal claimed third place in the Moldovan National Division, qualifying for the 2009-10 UEFA Europa League. Gaiduchevici made his debut in Europe in the 3–0 home loss to PFC Cherno More Varna of Bulgaria on 23 July 2009. He also played in the 1–0 away loss to Cherno More that saw Iskra-Stal crash out of the UEFA Europa League on aggregate. The following season, Iskra-Stal again qualified for the UEFA Europa League by finishing as 2009-10 Moldovan National Division runners-up. Artiom played in all but one of the club's thirty-three league matches. 2010–11 turned out to be Gaiduchevici's last for Iskra-Stal. After making twenty league appearances in the first half of the season, he left before the season's finish to join the league's eventual winners, FC Dacia Chişinău, signing a two-year contract with his new team. At the end of his spell at FC Iskra-Stal, Artiom had a record of just 55 goals conceded in 76 matches, a record that had attracted big teams such as Dacia.

=== Dacia Chişinău ===
Making his debut in a 2–0 win over FC Tiraspol on 26 February 2011, Gaiduchevici made a total of seven appearances in 2010–11 for Dacia as they won the Moldovan National Division. This championship win qualified the club for the 2011-12 UEFA Champions League, where they were drawn against FC Zestaponi of Georgia in the second qualifying round. Gaiduchevici played in both the away leg on 13 July 2011, where Dacia were beaten 3–0 in Zestaponi, and the home leg on 20 July where even a 2–0 victory was not enough for Dacia to progress to the next round as they were defeated on aggregate.

== International career ==
Gaiduchevici made six appearances for Moldova U-17, making his debut on 17 September 2003 in a 4–3 win over Kazakhstan in a UEFA European Under-17 Football Championship qualifier. He also played twice for Moldova U-19 before graduating to the senior team.

Artiom made his senior debut for Moldova on 3 March 2010 against Kazakhstan in a friendly, coming on as a 90th-minute substitute with Moldova having already scored the only goal of the match. Gaiduchevici started his first senior game for Moldova in a 3-2 friendly loss to the United Arab Emirates on 29 May 2010. He had to wait over a year for his third senior cap, playing in the 2–0 home defeat to Hungary in a UEFA Euro 2012 qualifier on 6 September 2011. Gaiduchevici played the full ninety minutes after previously being an unused substitute in the 4–1 loss to Finland on 2 September. He was again an unused substitute in the 1–0 loss to the Netherlands on 7 October but played his fourth game for Moldova in the 4-0 hammering of San Marino on 11 October. Gaiduchevici then played the whole of the 2–0 friendly loss to Georgia on 11 November 2011.

Gaiduchevici made his first international appearance of 2012 in a 0–0 draw with Belarus on 29 February, replacing Stanislav Namasco at half-time.
