= Adam Ismailov =

Russian footballer

Personal information
- Full name: Adam Alamatovich Ismailov
- Date of birth: 1 May 1976 (age 50)
- Height: 1.79 m (5 ft 10 1/2 in)
- Position: Goalkeeper

Senior career*
Years	Team	Apps	(Gls)
1992	FC Erzu Grozny	4	(0)
1993–1994	FC Gigant Grozny	25	(0)
1998–2000	FC Avtodor Vladikavkaz	31	(0)
2001	FC Terek Grozny	21	(0)
2003	FC Shakhtyor Shakhty	5	(0)
2004	FC Terek Grozny	1	(0)
2005	FC Terek Grozny (reserves)	3	(0)
2006	FC Magas-IGU Nazran (D4)		
2006	FC Angusht Nazran	9	(0)
2009	FC Angusht Nazran	1	(0)
2010	FC Dacia Chişinău	1	(0)
- * Club domestic league appearances and goals

Adam Alamatovich Ismailov (Russian: Адам Аламатович Исмаилов; born 1 May 1976) is a former Russian professional football player.
