= Alexandru Cheltuială =

Moldovan footballer

Personal information
- Date of birth: 5 February 1983 (age 43)
- Place of birth: Chişinău, Moldavian SSR, Soviet Union
- Height: 1.76 m (5 ft 9 1/2 in)
- Position: Defender

Senior career*
Years	Team	Apps	(Gls)
2005–2006	FC Politehnica Chişinău	6	(0)
2006–2009	CS Tiligul-Tiras Tiraspol	58	(1)
2008–2009	FC Dacia Chişinău	13	(0)
2009–2011	FC Olimpia Bălți	65	(3)
2011–2012	FC Zimbru Chișinău	12	(0)
2012–2013	Academia Chişinău	24	(1)
2013	FC Costuleni	7	(1)
2014	Victoria Bardar		
2014	Academia Chişinău	10	(0)
2015–2016	Spicul Chișcăreni		
2016–2017	CF Ungheni	5	(0)

International career
2010	Moldova	1	(0)
- * Club domestic league appearances and goals

Alexandru Cheltuială (born 5 February 1983) is a Moldovan footballer who played as a defender. He has also played once for the Moldova national team.
