= Anatoliy Matkevych =

Ukrainian footballer

Personal information
- Date of birth: 17 June 1977 (age 49)
- Place of birth: Dnipropetrovsk, Ukrainian SSR, Soviet Union
- Height: 1.88 m (6 ft 2 in)
- Position: Midfielder

Senior career*
Years	Team	Apps	(Gls)
1994	Dnipro Dnipropetrovsk	0	(0)
1994	Zirka Kirovohrad	1	(0)
1994	FC Lokomotyv Znamianka		
1995–1996	Metalurh Novomoskovsk	26	(1)
1996–1998	Kremin Kremenchuk	67	(7)
1996	→ Hirnyk-Sport Komsomolsk (loan)	2	(0)
1999	Metalurh Zaporizhzhia	2	(0)
1999	→ Metalurh-2 Zaporizhzhia	4	(0)
1999–2001	Dnipro Dnipropetrovsk	10	(0)
1999–2001	→ Dnipro-2 Dnipropetrovsk	30	(3)
2000–2001	→ Dnipro-3 Dnipropetrovsk	8	(0)
2001	Nafkom-Akademia Irpen	17	(0)
2002–2004	Kryvbas Kryvyi Rih	21	(0)
2003	→ Kryvbas-2 Kryvyi Rih	5	(0)
2004	→ Polissya Zhytomyr (loan)	11	(0)
2005	Tavriya Simferopol	2	(0)
2006	Krymteplitsia Molodizhne	16	(3)
2007	Al-Ittihad		
2007	Desna Chernihiv	3	(0)
2008	Olimpik Kirovohrad	13	(1)
2008	Komunalnyk Luhansk	8	(0)
2009	Nasaf Qarshi	16	(0)
2010	Dacia Chișinău	5	(0)
2010–2011	Mykolaiv	26	(1)
2012	Sumy	9	(0)
2012	Nyva Ternopil	26	(2)
- * Club domestic league appearances and goals

Anatoliy Matkevych (Ukrainian: Анатолій Маткевич; born 17 June 1977) is a Ukrainian former football player.

Matkevych played for MFC Mykolaiv during the 2010–11 Ukrainian First League season. Matkevych participated the 2007 AFC Champions League group stages with Al-Ittihad Aleppo.
