= Oleh Zhurka =

Ukrainian footballer

Personal information
- Full name: Oleh Vasylyovych Zhurka
- Date of birth: 4 November 1977 (age 48)
- Place of birth: Kyiv, Ukrainian SSR
- Height: 1.78 m (5 ft 10 in)
- Position: Defender

Senior career*
Years	Team	Apps	(Gls)
1995–1997	FC Dynamo-3 Kyiv	26	(0)
1998–1999	FC Podillya Khmelnytskyi	62	(3)
2000	FC Naftovyk Okhtyrka	15	(0)
2000	FC Polihraftekhnika Oleksandria	11	(0)
2001–2002	FC Zakarpattia Uzhhorod	31	(1)
2001–2002	→ FC Zakarpattia-2 Uzhhorod	6	(0)
2002–2003	FC Polihraftekhnika Oleksandria	23	(1)
2003–2004	FC Nyva Vinnytsia	33	(1)
2004–2005	FC Naftovyk-Ukrnafta Okhtyrka	31	(0)
2005–2006	FC Obolon Kyiv	33	(1)
2007	FC Naftovyk-Ukrnafta Okhtyrka	8	(0)
2007	FC Podillya Khmelnytskyi	8	(2)
2008–2011	FC Iskra-Stal Rîbniţa	50	(0)
- * Club domestic league appearances and goals

Oleh Zhurka (Ukrainian: Олег Васильович Журка; born 4 November 1977) is a Ukrainian former footballer.
