= Jymmy =

Brazilian footballer

Personal information
- Full name: Jymmy Dougllas França
- Date of birth: 15 April 1984 (age 42)
- Place of birth: Rio de Janeiro, Brazil
- Height: 1.87 m (6 ft 1 1/2 in)
- Position: Striker

Team information
- Current team: Paulista

Senior career*
Years	Team	Apps	(Gls)
2001–2002	Castelo		
2004	Estrela do Norte	4	(2)
2005–2007	Angra dos Reis	21	(15)
2006	Quissamã	19	(11)
2007	Americano	8	(5)
2007–2008	Friburguense	14	(7)
2008	Jaguaré	13	(7)
2008	América de Natal	8	(5)
2009	Spartak Trnava	11	(1)
2009–2011	Sheriff Tiraspol	67	(25)
2011	→ Chornomorets Odesa (loan)	4	(1)
2012	Shimizu S-Pulse	14	(0)
2012	→ Tokyo Verdy (loan)	7	(1)
2015–	Paulista		
- * Club domestic league appearances and goals as of 26 March 2015

Jymmy Dougllas França (born 15 April 1984), known as just Jymmy, is a Brazilian footballer who plays for Paulista.

In Brazil, he played for clubs at Campeonato Carioca and Campeonato Capixaba. He also played at Campeonato Brasileiro Série C 2007 and Campeonato Brasileiro Série B 2008 before he moved to Slovakia in January 2009. Jymmy was signed by Sheriff Tiraspol in July 2009. On 4 August 2011, it was announced that Jymmy has joined Chornomorets on a six-month loan, with an option to buy at the end of loan.

== Honours ==
=== Individual ===
Sheriff Tiraspol

- Moldovan National Division Top scorer: 2009–10 (13 goals; joint with Alexandru Maximov)
