= Aleksei Bondarev =

Russian footballer

Personal information
- Full name: Aleksei Sergeyevich Bondarev
- Date of birth: 5 August 1987 (age 39)
- Place of birth: Volgograd, Soviet Union
- Height: 1.87 m (6 ft 2 in)
- Position: Defender

Senior career*
Years	Team	Apps	(Gls)
2007	FC Saturn Yegoryevsk	21	(1)
2007–2008	FC Politehnica Chişinău	10	(0)
2008	FC Torpedo-RG Moscow	12	(0)
2009–2010	FC Dacia Chişinău	1	(0)
2011	FC Olimpia Gelendzhik	5	(0)
2012–2013	FC Khimik Novomoskovsk		
- * Club domestic league appearances and goals

Aleksei Sergeyevich Bondarev (Russian: Алексей Сергеевич Бондарев, born 5 August 1987) is a former Russian footballer.
