= Mihail Moraru =

Moldovan former professional footballer (born 1979)

Personal information
- Date of birth: 22 October 1979 (age 47)
- Place of birth: Chișinău, Moldavian SSR, Soviet Union
- Height: 1.82 m (6 ft 0 in)
- Position: Goalkeeper

Team information
- Current team: Metaloglobus București (GK coach)

Senior career*
Years	Team	Apps	(Gls)
2002–2008	Dacia Chişinău	79	(0)
2009	Petrolul Ploieşti	0	(0)
2009	Arieşul Turda	5	(0)
2010–2012	Milsami Orhei	57	(0)
2012	Costuleni	13	(0)
2013–2014	Rapid Ghidighici	22	(0)
Total		176	(0)

International career
2009–2014	Moldova	1	(0)

Managerial career
- 2017–2019: Energeticianul (GK coach)
- 2019: Dunărea Călărași (GK coach)
- 2019–2021: Farul Constanța (GK coach)
- 2021–2023: Farul II Constanța (GK coach)
- 2023–2025: Metaloglobus București (video analyst)
- 2025–2026: Farul Constanța (GK coach)
- 2026–: Metaloglobus București (GK coach)
- * Club domestic league appearances and goals

Mihail Moraru (born 22 October 1979) is a Moldovan former professional footballer who played as a goalkeeper, currently goalkeeping coacht at Liga II club Metaloglobus București.

== International career ==
Mihail Moraru played an international game for Moldova, in a 1–1 draw against Macedonia.

== Honours ==
Milsami Orhei

- Moldovan Cup: 2011–12
