= Maxim Repinețchi =

Moldovan footballer

Maxim Repinetchi
Personal information
- Date of birth: 23 May 1989 (age 37)
- Place of birth: Moldova
- Height: 1.79 m (5 ft 10 1/2 in)
- Position: Midfielder

Team information
- Current team: FC Olimpia Bălți

Senior career*
Years	Team	Apps	(Gls)
2006–2009	FC Olimpia Bălți	20	(0)
2009–2010	FC Nistru Otaci	16	(3)
2010–2011	FC Olimpia Bălți	19	(2)
2012	FC Dinamo-Auto Tiraspol	2	(1)
2012–2013	FC Costuleni	6	(0)
2013–2014	FC Olimpia Bălți	27	(2)
- * Club domestic league appearances and goals

Maxim Repinetchi is a Moldovan player who currently is playing for FC Olimpia Bălți.
