= Ilya Soshnin =

Russian footballer

Personal information
- Full name: Ilya Igorevich Soshnin
- Date of birth: 21 June 1987 (age 39)
- Place of birth: Lipetsk, Russian SFSR
- Height: 1.84 m (6 ft 1/2 in)
- Position: Defender

Youth career
- 2003: Metallurg Lipetsk
- 2004: Saturn Yegoryevsk

Senior career*
Years	Team	Apps	(Gls)
2005	FC Shatura	29	(0)
2006	Saturn Ramenskoye	0	(0)
2006–2007	FC Saturn Yegoryevsk	7	(0)
2007	FC Energia Shatura	29	(2)
2008	Politehnica-UTM Chișinău	12	(0)
2008	Tiligul-Tiras Tiraspol	2	(0)
2009	Tiraspol	16	(0)
2010	Taganrog	17	(0)
2010	Spartak Kostroma	4	(0)
2011–2012	Tyumen	16	(0)
- * Club domestic league appearances and goals as of 03:40, 4 March 2012 (UTC)

Ilya Igorevich Soshnin (Russian: Илья Игоревич Сошнин; born 21 June 1987) is a former Russian professional football player.
