= Magomed Khaskhanov =

Russian footballer

Personal information
- Full name: Magomed Takhirovich Khaskhanov
- Date of birth: 27 June 1975 (age 51)
- Height: 1.78 m (5 ft 10 in)
- Positions: Defender; midfielder

Senior career*
Years	Team	Apps	(Gls)
1992–1994	FC Erzu Grozny	9	(1)
1995–2006	FC Angusht Nazran	367	(45)
2008	FC Zhemchuzhina-Sochi	18	(4)
2009	FC Angusht Nazran	25	(4)
2010	FC Dacia Chişinău	4	
- * Club domestic league appearances and goals

Magomed Takhirovich Khaskhanov (Russian: Магомед Тахирович Хасханов; born 27 June 1975) is a former Russian professional football player.
