= Claude Maka Kum =

Footballer (born 1985)

Desiré Koum
Personal information
- Full name: Claude Ernest Désiré Koum Maka
- Date of birth: 16 May 1985 (age 41)
- Place of birth: Limbe, Cameroon
- Height: 1.78 m (5 ft 10 in)
- Positions: Winger; forward

Youth career
- –2002: Best Stars de Limbe

Senior career*
Years	Team	Apps	(Gls)
- Illichivets Mariupol
2005	KAMAZ		
2005–2009	Dordoi Bishkek		
2010	Dacia Chișinău	6	(0)
2010	→ CF Găgăuzia (loan)	8	(0)
2012	Dordoi Bishkek		
2013	FK Dainava	9	(1)
2013	Dordoi Bishkek	2	(0)
2014	Saham		
2016–2017	Siviriez		
2017	Echallens	4	(0)
2018	Azzurri 90 Lausanne	9	(0)
2018	FC Renens		
2019	Turc Lausanne		

International career^{‡}
2012–2014	Kyrgyzstan	13	(0)
- * Club domestic league appearances and goals as of 22 May 2021 ‡ National team caps and goals as of 5 September 2014

Claude Ernest Désiré Koum Maka (Russian: Клод Мака Кум; born 16 May 1985) is a professional footballer who most recently played as a winger or forward for Swiss 3. Liga club Turc Lausanne. Born in Cameroon, he represented the Kyrgyzstan national team from 2012 to 2014, making 13 appearances.

== Career ==
Maka Kum was abandoned in Moscow aged 17 by a rogue agent that disappeared once they had arrived in Russia. After a while in Moscow, Maka Kum went on trial, and signed for Illichivets Mariupol. Six months later, Maka Kum left Illichivets Mariupol and returned to Moscow. After a trial with Dynamo Makhachkala, Maka Kum was approached by, and joined, KAMAZ in 2005 before quickly following the head coach to Dordoi Bishkek.

In February 2010, Maka Kum signed for Dacia Chișinău of the Moldovan National Division, before joining CF Găgăuzia on loan on 31 August 2010. In July 2013, Maka Kum went on trial with Dnepr Mogilev of the Belarusian Premier League.

After moving to Switzerland, Maka Kum went on trial with Lausanne-Sport before signing for Siviriez thanks to Andrei Rudakov. Maka Kum then went on to stay in Switzerland, playing for Echallens, Azzurri 90 Lausanne and FC Renens, despite interest from the Russian Professional Football League.

== Career statistics ==
=== Club ===
As of match played 20 May 2013

Appearances and goals by club, season and competition
Club	Season	League			National cup		Continental		Total	
Club	Season	Division	Apps	Goals	Apps	Goals	Apps	Goals	Apps	Goals
Dacia Chișinău	2009–10	Moldovan National Division	6	0	0	0	0	0	6	0
Dacia Chișinău	2010–11	Moldovan National Division	1	0	0	0	1	0	2	0
Dacia Chișinău	Total		7	0	0	0	1	0	8	0
Găgăuzia (loan)	2010–11	Moldovan National Division	8	0	0	0	–		8	0
Dordoi Bishkek	2012	Shoro Top League					4	1	4	1
Dainava Alytus	2013	A Lyga	9	1	0	0	0	0	9	1
Career total			24	1	0	0	5	1	29	2

=== International ===
Appearances and goals by national team and year
National team	Year	Apps	Goals
Kyrgyzstan	2012	1	0
Kyrgyzstan	2013	6	0
Kyrgyzstan	2014	6	0
Total		13	0

== Honours ==
Dordoi Bishkek

- Kyrgyzstan League: 2007, 2008, 2009, 2012
- Kyrgyzstan Cup: 2008, 2012
