= Abdulkhamid Akhilgov =

Russian footballer

Personal information
- Full name: Abdulkhamid Khuseynovich Akhilgov
- Date of birth: 31 August 1980 (age 46)
- Height: 1.70 m (5 ft 7 in)
- Position: Midfielder

Senior career*
Years	Team	Apps	(Gls)
2000–2006	FC Angusht Nazran	168	(10)
2009	FC Angusht Nazran	32	(6)
2010	FC Dacia Chişinău	9	(3)
2010	FC Angusht Nazran	12	(1)
2011–2015	FC Angusht Nazran	108	(12)
2016–2017	FC Angusht Nazran	23	(0)
2018–2019	FC Angusht Nazran	22	(0)
- * Club domestic league appearances and goals

Abdulkhamid Khuseynovich Akhilgov (Russian: Абдулхамид Хусейнович Ахильгов; born 31 August 1980) is a Russian former professional football player.

== Club career ==
He made his Russian Football National League debut for FC Angusht Nazran on 26 March 2006 in a game against FC Terek Grozny. He played one more season in the FNL for Angusht.
