= Andrei Mocanu =

Romanian professional footballer

Personal information
- Full name: Marius Andrei Mocanu
- Date of birth: 10 July 2003 (age 23)
- Place of birth: Romania
- Height: 1.77 m (5 ft 10 in)
- Position: Forward

Team information
- Current team: Civitavecchia

Youth career
- 2013–2018: Gsd Nuova Tor Tre Teste
- 2018–2020: Ciampino Giovanili
- 2020–2022: Avellino

Senior career*
Years	Team	Apps	(Gls)
2022–2023	Avellino	2	(0)
2022	→ Vastogirardi (loan)	3	(0)
2023	→ Nuova Florida (loan)	9	(0)
2023–2024	Aurelia Antica		
2024	Trastevere		
2024–2025	Pomezia		
2025–	Civitavecchia		
- * Club domestic league appearances and goals as of 7 May 2023

Marius Andrei Mocanu (born 10 July 2003) is a Romanian professional footballer who plays as a forward.

== Career ==
Mocanu made his senior debut for Avellino on 16 March 2022, in a 1–0 Serie C win over Taranto.

== Career statistics ==
As of match played 26 March 2022

Appearances and goals by club, season and competition
Club	Season	League			National Cup		Continental		Other		Total	
Club	Season	Division	Apps	Goals	Apps	Goals	Apps	Goals	Apps	Goals	Apps	Goals
Avellino	2021–22	Serie C	2	0	—		—		—		2	0
Career total			2	0	0	0	0	0	0	0	2	0
