= Dumitru Popovici (footballer) =

Moldovan footballer

Personal information
- Date of birth: 5 August 1983 (age 43)
- Place of birth: Soviet Union
- Height: 1.91 m (6 ft 3 in)
- Position: Defender

Senior career*
Years	Team	Apps	(Gls)
2001	Constructorul Chişinău	2	(0)
2002	Sheriff Tiraspol	2	(0)
2003–2007	Tiligul Tiraspol	71	(10)
2007	Al-Ittihad		
2007–2008	Tiligul Tiraspol	24	(1)
2008	Dinamo Bender	13	(1)
2009–2013	Dacia Chişinău	99	(6)
2013–2014	Tiraspol	14	(1)
2014	Bukhoro	11	(0)
2015–2016	Saxan Ceadîr-Lunga	11	(1)
2016	Zaria Bălți	5	(0)
2016	Saxan Ceadîr-Lunga	6	(0)
2016–2017	Dinamo-Auto	45	(2)

International career
2001	Moldova U19	3	(0)
	Moldova U21	1	(0)
2009–	Moldova	1	(0)
- * Club domestic league appearances and goals as of 7 August 2015

Dumitru Popovici (born 5 August 1983) is a Moldovan footballer.

== Career ==
Popovici appeared in an Intertoto Cup first round match for Tiligul Tiraspol against Pogoń Szczecin on 18 June 2005. He would move abroad to play in Syria, and participated in the 2007 AFC Champions League with Al-Ittihad (Aleppo).

In 2009, Popovici signed with FC Dacia Chişinău and made his first and only appearance for the senior Moldova national football team. He had previously played for the U-19 and U-21 national teams.
