= Dmitri Vornișel =

Moldovan footballer

Dmitri Vornişel
Personal information
- Full name: Dmitri Vornişel
- Date of birth: 2 February 1990 (age 36)
- Place of birth: Tiraspol, Moldavian SSR
- Height: 1.81 m (5 ft 11 in)
- Position: Striker

Team information
- Current team: Iskra-Stal
- Number: 13

Senior career*
Years	Team	Apps	(Gls)
2008–2009	Sheriff Tiraspol		
2009–2012	Tiraspol	75	(16)
2012–	Iskra-Stal	14	(1)

International career^{‡}
2009–	Moldova U-21	10	(2)
- * Club domestic league appearances and goals as of 24 May 2012 ‡ National team caps and goals as of 7 September 2011

Dmitri Vornişel (born 2 February 1990, Tiraspol, Moldavian SSR) is a Moldavian football striker who plays for club Iskra-Stal.
