= Ștefan Caraulan =

Moldovan footballer

Ştefan Caraulan
Personal information
- Full name: Ştefan Caraulan
- Date of birth: 2 February 1989 (age 37)
- Place of birth: Moldova
- Height: 1.83 m (6 ft 0 in)
- Position: Defender

Team information
- Current team: Spicul Chișcăreni
- Number: 15

Youth career
- 2007–2009: Zimbru-2 Chișinău

Senior career*
Years	Team	Apps	(Gls)
2007–2009	FC Rapid Ghidighici	26	(0)
2009–2011	Dacia Chișinău	29	(0)
2011	→Zimbru Chișinău	6	(0)
2011	→FC Sfîntul Gheorghe	8	(0)
2012–2014	Academia Chișinău	47	(2)
2014	Speranța Crihana Veche	6	(0)
2014	FK Šiauliai	10	(0)
2015–	Spicul Chișcăreni	0	(0)

International career^{‡}
2008–2010	Moldova U21	9	(0)
2010	Moldova U23	2	(0)
2012	Moldova	1	(0)
- * Club domestic league appearances and goals as of 16 August 2015 ‡ National team caps and goals as of 16 August 2015

Ştefan Caraulan (born 2 February 1989) is a Moldovan footballer who is currently playing for Spicul Chișcăreni. In 2011, he made his debut for Moldova against Venezuela.
