= Iulian Bursuc =

Moldovan footballer

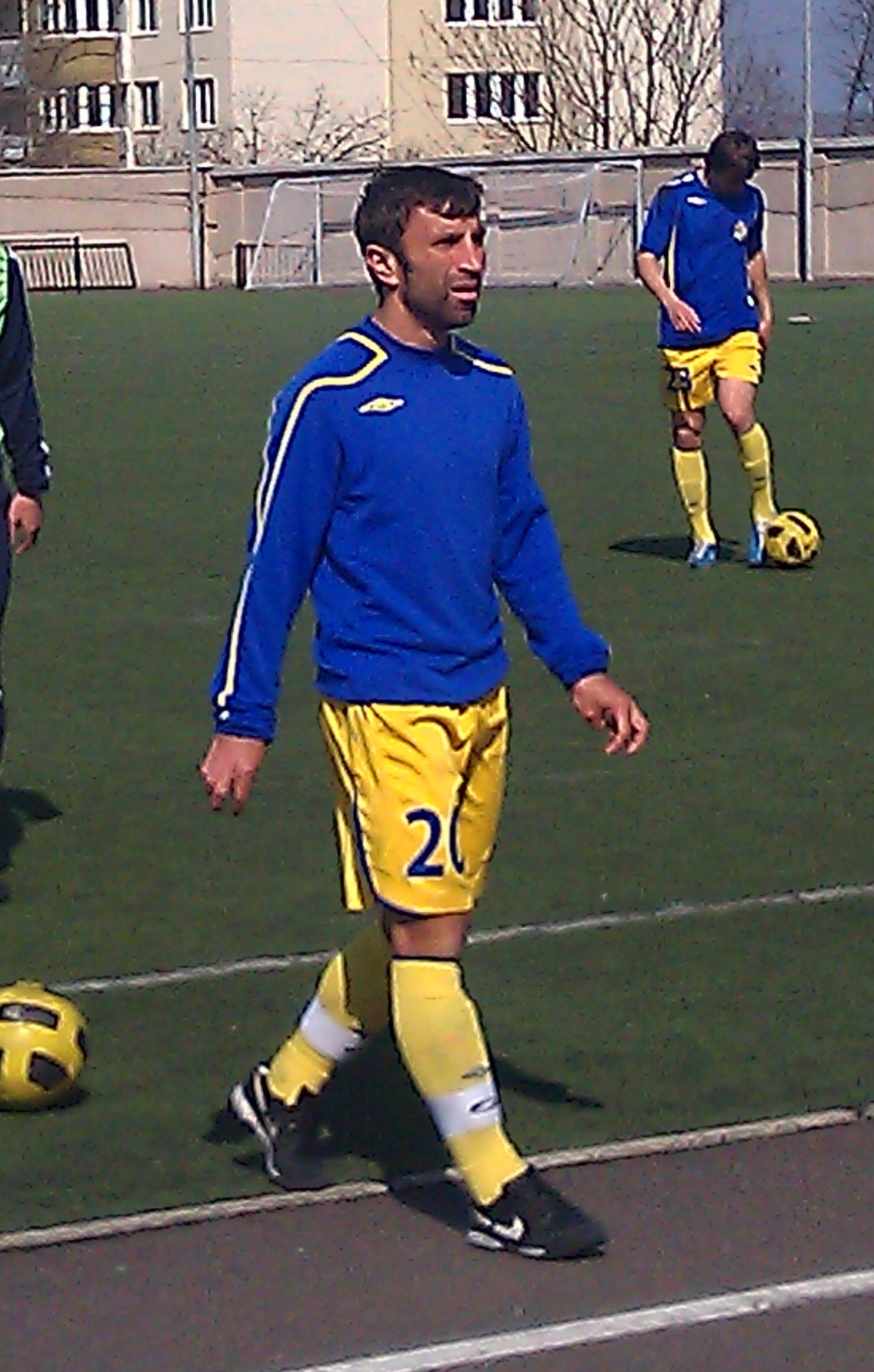

Personal information
- Date of birth: 23 September 1976 (age 50)
- Height: 1.66 m (5 ft 5 1/2 in)
- Position: Midfielder

Senior career*
Years	Team	Apps	(Gls)
1992–1994	Agro Chișinău	43	(6)
1994–2001	Constructorul Chișinău	145	(23)
2001–2006	Nistru Otaci	85	(21)
2005	→ Aktobe (loan)	23	(2)
2006–2009	Žalgiris Vilnius	57	(8)
2008	→ Savit Mogilev (loan)	13	(1)
2009	→ Tauras Tauragė (loan)	10	(0)
2009	Nasaf Qarshi	5	(0)
2010–2011	Dacia Chișinău	33	(3)
2011–2016	Sfântul Gheorghe Suruceni	94	(18)

International career
2002–2005	Moldova	5	(0)
- * Club domestic league appearances and goals as of 31 December 2016

Iulian Bursuc (born 23 September 1976) is a retired Moldovan professional football player.

== Career ==
Iulian started his adult football career in 1992 with the Moldovan club "Agro" in Chișinău. In 1994, he moved to another capital club, "Constructorul." From 2001 to 2006, he played for FC Nistru Otaci. In 2005, he played on loan for the Kazakh club "Aktobe."

In 2006, he moved to Lithuania and joined Vilnius-based "Žalgiris" (B). During his time with the Lithuanian club, he went on loan twice, first playing for the Belarusian club FC Savit Mogilev in 2008 and then for the Lithuanian club FK Tauras Tauragė in 2009. After his contract with Žalgiris ended, he moved to Uzbekistan and played for "Nasaf."

In 2010, he returned to Moldova and became a player for FC Dacia Chișinău. The following season, he transferred to "Sfîntul Gheorghe." In 2011, he was involved in an unfortunate incident where he struck referee Gennadiy Sidenko during a match between "Iskra-Stal" (Rîbnița) and "Sfîntul Gheorghe" (3-0) in the 13th round of the National Division 2011/12. Initially, he was suspended for two years, but the suspension was later reduced to 13 months.

== Personal life ==
His son Andrei Bursuc is also a professional footballer. They played together at Sfîntul Gheorghe.
