= Igor Negrescu =

Moldovan footballer and manager

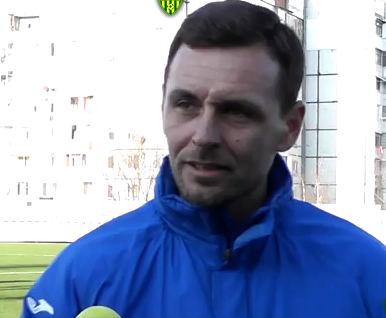
- Negrescu in 2015

Personal information
- Date of birth: 17 April 1979 (age 47)
- Place of birth: Chișinău, Moldavian SSR, Soviet Union
- Height: 1.86 m (6 ft 1 in)
- Position: Defender

Team information
- Current team: Dacia Buiucani (head coach)

Senior career*
Years	Team	Apps	(Gls)
2002–2011	Dacia Chișinău	?	(?)

Managerial career
- 2011–2012: Dacia-2 Buiucani
- 2012: Dacia Chișinău
- 2012–2013: Dacia-2 Buiucani
- 2013–2014: Dacia Chișinău
- 2014–2015: Dinamo-Auto Tiraspol
- 2015–2019: Dacia Buiucani
- 2019–2021: Moldova U17
- 2023: Moldova U17
- 2024–2026: Moldova U17 (assistant)
- 2026–: Dacia Buiucani
- * Club domestic league appearances and goals as of 21 January 2026 ‡ National team caps and goals as of 21 January 2026

Igor Negrescu (born 17 April 1979) is a Moldovan professional football manager and former footballer. He is currently the head coach of Moldovan Liga club Dacia Buiucani.
