= Aleksei Trinitatskiy =

Russian footballer

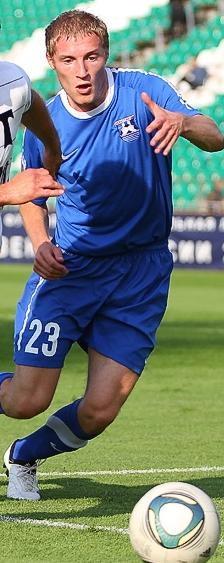

Personal information
- Full name: Aleksei Igorevich Trinitatskiy
- Date of birth: 10 January 1985 (age 41)
- Place of birth: Domodedovo, Russian SFSR
- Height: 1.70 m (5 ft 7 in)
- Positions: Right midfielder; central midfielder; forward

Senior career*
Years	Team	Apps	(Gls)
2001–2003	FC Torpedo-Metallurg Moscow	0	(0)
2004–2005	FC Saturn Moscow Oblast	2	(0)
2006	FC Spartak Nizhny Novgorod	8	(0)
2006	PFC Spartak Nalchik	1	(0)
2007	Dinaburg FC	11	(1)
2008–2009	FC Dacia Chişinău	26	(2)
2010–2011	FC Baltika Kaliningrad	42	(1)
2012–2014	FC Kaluga	75	(9)
2015–2019	FSC Dolgoprudny	99	(29)
2019	FC Volga Ulyanovsk	12	(1)
- * Club domestic league appearances and goals

Aleksei Igorevich Trinitatskiy (Russian: Алексей Игоревич Тринитацкий; born 10 January 1985) is a Russian former footballer.

== Career ==
He made his Russian Premier League debut for FC Saturn Ramenskoye on 7 July 2004 in a game against FC Torpedo Moscow.

Trinitatsky previously played for FC Saturn Moscow Oblast, PFC Spartak Nalchik and FC Spartak Nizhny Novgorod.
