= Eugen Gorceac =

Moldovan footballer

Personal information
- Date of birth: 10 March 1987 (age 39)
- Height: 1.78 m (5 ft 10 in)
- Position: Midfielder

Senior career*
Years	Team	Apps	(Gls)
2007–2010	Academia Chişinău	61	(15)
2010–2011	Dacia Chişinău	27	(3)
2011–2012	Zimbru Chişinău	12	(0)
2012	→ Sfîntul Gheorghe (loan)	8	(1)
2013–2014	Speranța Crihana Veche	33	(5)
2014	Costuleni	4	(0)
2014–2015	Speranța Nisporeni		

International career
2008–2010	Moldova	3	(0)
- * Club domestic league appearances and goals

Eugen Gorceac (born 10 March 1987) is a retired Moldovan professional footballer who last plays for FC Costuleni.

== Honours ==
- Moldovan National Division: 2010–11
