= Eric Sackey =

Ghanaian footballer (born 1987)

Personal information
- Full name: Eric Ato Sackey
- Date of birth: August 20, 1987 (age 39)
- Place of birth: Accra, Ghana
- Height: 1.80 m (5 ft 11 in)
- Position: Striker

Youth career
- Tema All Stars

Senior career*
| Years | Team | Apps | (Gls) |
| 2000–2007 | Tema All Stars | 25 | (10) |
| 2007–2008 | → Olimpia Bălţi (loan) | 14 | (6) |
| 2008–2009 | Olimpia Bălţi | 15 | (7) |
| 2008–2009 | → Tema Youth (loan) | 18 | (6) |
| 2009–2013 | Dacia Chişinău | 38 | (12) |
| 2009–2010 | → Yangon United (loan) | 9 | (6) |
| 2011 | → Sfîntul Gheorghe (loan) | 11 | (7) |
| 2012 | → Zimbru Chișinău (loan) | 10 | (2) |
| 2012 | → Zimbru Chișinău (loan) | 9 | (6) |
| 2014–2017 | MC Alger | 35 | (13) |
- * Club domestic league appearances and goals

Eric Ato Sackey (born 20 August 1987 in Accra) is a Ghanaian footballer who last played for MC Alger in the Algerian Ligue Professionnelle 1.

== Career ==
Sackey started his career with Tema All Stars youth team, catching the attention of the head coach after scoring 3 goals in 7 games, leading to his promotion to the senior team for the following season. Sakey scored 7 goals in 18 games before signing on loan for FC Olimpia Bălţi of the Moldovan National Division, scoring 6 times in 14 games, helping them escape relegation and earning a permanent contract. Sakey was loaned back to Tema All stars during the 2008–09 season, during which he scored 6 goals in 18 appearances.

Prior to the start of the 2009–10 season, Sackey was sold by Olimpia Bălţi to league rivals FC Dacia Chișinău, for undisclosed fee. After half a season with Dacia, Sackey was loaned to Yangon United FC in the Myanmar National League for the remainder of the season. Sackey played for Dacia during the 2010–11 season, before going out on loan, to Sfîntul Gheorghe for the first half of the 2011–12 season. Whilst played for Sfântul Gheorghe Suruceni against Zimbru Chișinău in August 2011, Sakey was attacked by Zimbru fans. Sackey later joined Zimbru Chișinău on loan for the second half of the 2011–12 season. Sackey returned on loan to Zimbru Chișinău for the first half of the 2012–13 season, before returning to Dacia for the remainder of the season.

In July 2014, Sackey signed a two-year contract with MC Alger of the Algerian Ligue Professionnelle 1, after having impressed while on trial.
