= Gheorghe Ovseanicov =

Moldovan footballer

Personal information
- Full name: Gheorghe Ovseanicov
- Date of birth: 12 October 1985 (age 41)
- Place of birth: Sîngerei, Moldovan SSR, Soviet Union
- Height: 1.80 m (5 ft 11 in)
- Position: Striker

Senior career*
Years	Team	Apps	(Gls)
2002–2003	Locomotiva Bălți	18	(7)
2003–2006	Florești		
2006–2014	Zaria Bălți	124	(41)
2010	→ Cracovia (loan)	9	(0)
2012	→ Hapoel Rishon LeZion (loan)	16	(3)
2012	→ Sunkar (loan)	11	(1)
2013	→ Rapid Ghidighici (loan)	12	(3)
2013–2014	→ Dacia Chișinău (loan)	14	(4)
2014–2015	Tiraspol	18	(6)
2015–2018	Zaria Bălți	72	(8)
2019–2020	Speranța Drochia		
2020–2021	Grănicerul Glodeni		
2021	Bălți		
2022–2024	Florești		
Total		294	(73)

International career
2008–2013	Moldova	22	(2)
- * Club domestic league appearances and goals as of 26 May 2025

Gheorghe Ovseannicov (born 12 October 1985) is a former Moldovan professional footballer who played as a striker.

== Career ==
In addition to clubs from his native country, Ovseannicov also plied his trade for teams in Poland, Israel, and Kazakhstan.

=== International goal ===
Scores and results list Moldova's goal tally first.

No	Date	Venue	Opponent	Score	Result	Competition
1.	14 October 2009	Skonto Stadium, Riga, Latvia	Latvia	1–0	2–3	2010 World Cup qualifier
2.	10 August 2011	GSP Stadium, Strovolos, Cyprus	Cyprus	2–1	2–3	Friendly match

== Honours ==
Zaria Bălți

- Cupa Moldovei: 2015–16
