= Levan Korgalidze =

Georgian footballer

Personal information
- Full name: Levan Korgalidze
- Date of birth: 21 February 1980 (age 46)
- Place of birth: Tbilisi, Georgian SSR, Soviet Union
- Height: 1.72 m (5 ft 7 1/2 in)
- Position: Midfielder

Team information
- Current team: Iberia 1999

Senior career*
Years	Team	Apps	(Gls)
1996	Guria Lanchkhuti	3	(1)
1997	Dinamo-2 Tbilisi	15	(6)
1998	Arsenali Tbilisi	14	(0)
1999–2005	Skonto	125	(23)
2006	Torpedo Kutaisi	10	(2)
2006	Sioni Bolnisi	10	(1)
2007	Dinaburg FC	13	(0)
2008–2009	Dacia Chişinău	39	(7)
2009–2010	FC Zestaponi	28	(6)
2010–2011	Dacia Chişinău	32	(13)
2012–2013	Zimbru Chişinău	15	(5)
2013–2014	Metalurgi Rustavi	13	(2)
2014	Dila Gori	6	(0)

International career
2001	Georgia U21	4	(0)
2004	Georgia	3	(0)

Managerial career
- 2017–2018: Saburtalo (youth)
- 2019–2020: Locomotive
- 2020–2022: Saburtalo
- 2023–2024: Zhenis
- 2024–2025: Iberia 1999
- 2026: Dila
- * Club domestic league appearances and goals

Levan Korgalidze (Georgian: ლევან კორღალიძე; born 21 February 1980), also spelled as Korghalidze, is a Georgian professional football manager and former player who played as a midfielder. He is currently the acting head coach of Erovnuli Liga club Iberia 1999.

Korgalidze played regularly for the Georgia national under-21 team. His debut call-up to the national team was in 2003.

He is the son of Otar Korghalidze.

== Coaching career ==
Korgalidze started his coaching career in 2017 at Saburtalo Tbilisi at youth level. In the summer of 2018, he joined Locomotive Tbilisi as assistant manager and head coach of U15s. In April 2019, following some unsatisfactory results, Locomotive fired their manager, replacing him with Korgalidze. Under his leadership, the team not only climbed out of the drop zone, but also qualified for a UEFA European competition for the first time since 2008.

In early March 2020, the Erovnuli Liga season was suspended due to COVID-19 with Locomotive on top of the table after initial two rounds. By the time the matches resumed in July, the sides had parted ways at the club when a disagreement arose over the planned 70% cut of salaries.

In September 2020, Korgalidze returned to Saburtalo as a head coach. The next year, he guided the team to the Georgian Cup title, but left the club by mutual agreement on 8 June 2022.

In November 2023, Korgalidze was appointed as a manager at Kazakhstan Premier League club Zhenis, who had just won the promotion from the First Division. On 21 May 2024, he left the club by mutual consent.

Six weeks later Korgalidze was appointed at Saburtalo for the third time with the club renamed as Iberia 1999. His club was in crisis after losing seven out of eight matches across all competitions, but Korgalidze managed to rectify the situation and lead Iberia 1999 to their second champion's title in six years. He was named Manager of the Year by the Football Federation on 10 December 2024.

Korgalidze left the club on 31 July 2025 after a six-game winless run across all competitions which included a premature exit from the European season, although his team had at the same time achieved a thirty-game unbeaten run in the league.

On 13 May 2026, Korgalidze was appointed at Dila where he had ended his career as a player twelve years earlier. After four matches in charge, the club announced his departure citing his health condition as a reason.

== Managerial statistics ==
As of match played 11 January 2024

Managerial record by team and tenure
Team	Nat	From	To	Record							
Team	Nat	From	To	G	W	D	L	GF	GA	GD	Win %
Locomotive	(Georgia (country))	9 April 2019	30 June 2020	36	21	4	11	50	41	+9	58.33
Saburtalo	(Georgia (country))	18 September 2020	11 June 2022	40	16	12	12	58	49	+9	40.00
Zhenis	(Kazakhstan)	22 November 2023	21 May 2024	0	0	0	0	0	0	+0	—
Iberia 1999	(Georgia (country))	6 July 2024	31 July 2025	0	0	0	0	0	0	+0	—
Dila	(Georgia (country))	13 May 2026	6 June 2026	4	0	1	3	3	7	−4	0.00
Total				90	37	17	36	111	97	+14	41.11

== Honours ==
Saburtalo / Iberia 1999

- Erovnuli Liga: 2024
- Georgian Cup: 2021
