= Dumitru Bogdan =

Moldovan footballer

Personal information
- Full name: Dumitru Bogdan
- Date of birth: 4 March 1989 (age 37)
- Place of birth: Chișinău, Moldavian SSR
- Height: 1.86 m (6 ft 1 in)
- Position: Defender

Team information
- Current team: FC Academia Chișinău
- Number: 21

Senior career*
Years	Team	Apps	(Gls)
2008–2009	FC Iskra-Stal	20	(1)
2009–2010	FC Sfîntul Gheorghe	24	(2)
2010	FC Taraz	5	(0)
2011	FC Kaisar	13	(1)
2011	FC Tobol	5	(0)
2012–	FC Academia Chișinău	26	(2)
- * Club domestic league appearances and goals as of 15 July 2013

Dumitru Bogdan (born 4 March 1989, Chișinău, Moldavian SSR) is a Moldavian football defender who plays for FC Academia Chișinău.

== Club statistics ==
- Total matches played in Moldavian First League: 70 matches - 5 goals
