= Gock Habib =

Cameroonian footballer

Personal information
- Full name: Habib Gock Mekang
- Date of birth: April 23, 1982 (age 44)
- Place of birth: Bafia, Cameroon
- Height: 1.87 m (6 ft 1 1/2 in)
- Position: Defender

Youth career
- Sable De Batie

Senior career*
Years	Team	Apps	(Gls)
2000–2002	Maritime Douala		
2002–2004	Sporting Club TNUC		
2004–2005	Caïman Douala		
2005–2009	Nistru Otaci	91	(5)
2009–2010	Dacia Chișinău	23	(2)
2010–2011	Akzhayik	45	(4)
2012	Nistru Otaci	0	(0)
2012–2013	Bucha		
2013	Khayr Vahdat		
2013–2014	Bucha		
2015	Sokol Mikhailovka-Rubezhovka		
- * Club domestic league appearances and goals as of 2 October 2014

Habib Gock Mekang (born April 23, 1982 in Cameroon) is a Cameroonian professional footballer whose last known club was Kyiv amateur side Sokol Mikhailovka-Rubezhovka.

== Career ==
Habib made over 100 Moldovan National Division appearances with FC Nistru Otaci and FC Dacia Chișinău.

After leaving Nistru Otaci in 2012, Habib went on to play for Kyiv based amateur club Bucha until 2012, with a move to Khayr Vahdat FK in the Tajik League occurring in August 2013, where he joined fellow Cameroonian Paul Rolland. Upon returning from Tajikistan, Habib returned to Bucha before moving to fellow Kyiv based amateur club Sokol Mikhailovka-Rubezhovka in 2015.
