= Milești, Nisporeni =

Milești
- Village
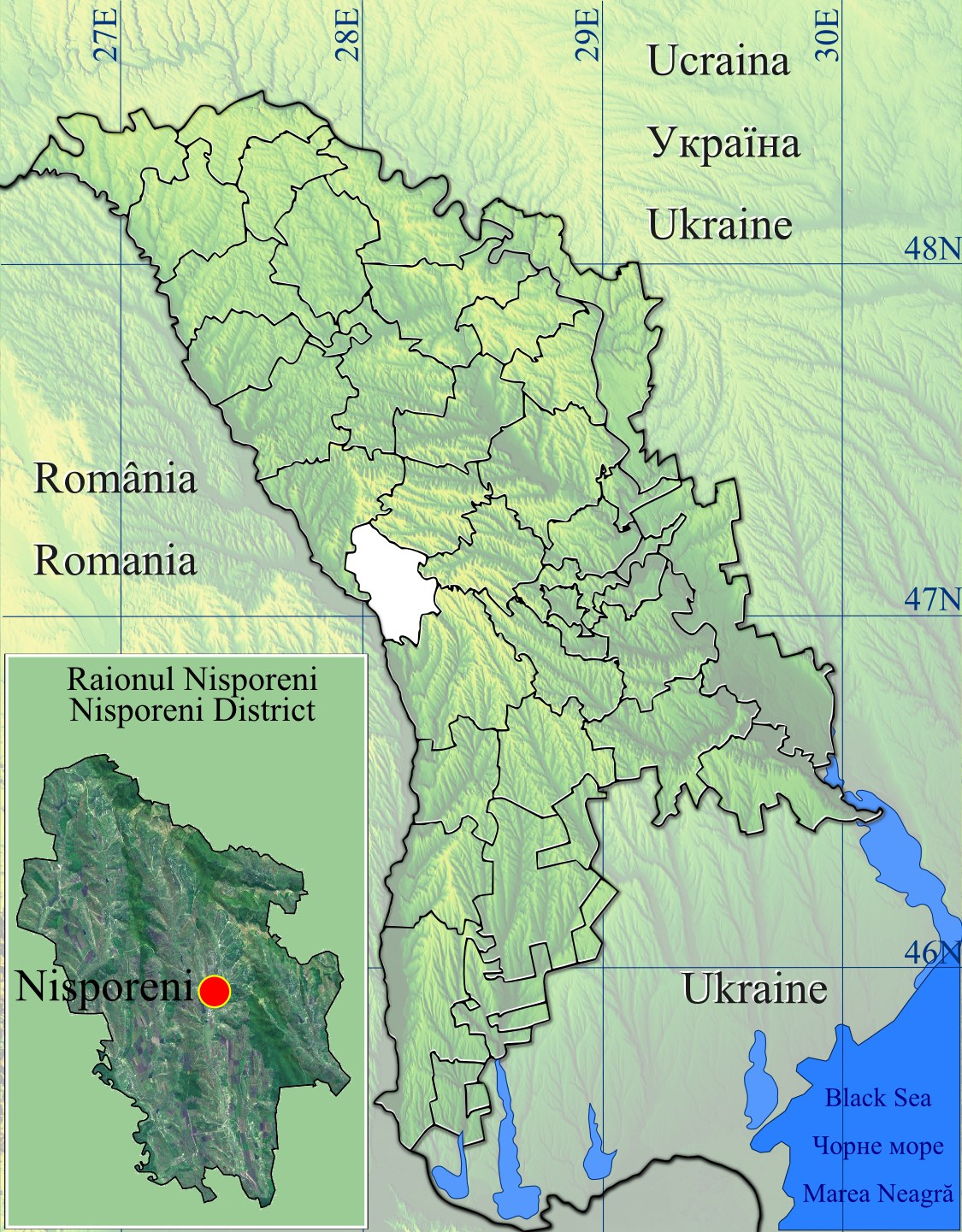
- Location within Nisporeni
- Coordinates: 47°13′18″N 28°2′25″E
- Country: Moldova
- District: Nisporeni District

Government
  - Mayor: Radu Vîrlan (PDM)
- Elevation: 314 m (1,030 ft)

Population (2014 census)
  - Total: 2,282
- Time zone: UTC+2 (EET)
  - Summer (DST): UTC+3 (EEST)

Milești is a village in Nisporeni District, Moldova.
