= Sergiu Cojocari =

Moldovan football player

Personal information
- Date of birth: 15 May 1988 (age 38)
- Place of birth: Chişinău, Moldova
- Height: 1.85 m (6 ft 1 in)
- Position: Centre back

Team information
- Current team: Academia Chișinău
- Number: 15

Youth career
- FC Zimbru-2 Chișinău

Senior career*
| Years | Team | Apps | (Gls) |
| 2007–2008 | Zimbru-2 Chișinău | 10 | (1) |
| 2007–2010 | Zimbru Chișinău | 33 | (3) |
| 2011 | → CF Găgăuzia | 13 | (1) |
| 2011–2012 | FC Sfîntul Gheorghe | 23 | (0) |
| 2012–2014 | FC Veris | 43 | (4) |
| 2015 | Dacia Chișinău | 8 | (0) |
| 2015– | Academia Chișinău | 1 | (0) |
- * Club domestic league appearances and goals as of 4 August 2015

Sergiu Cojocari (born 15 May 1988) is a Moldovan football player who currently is playing for Academia Chișinău.

Cojocari was called up to the senior Moldova national football team for friendlies against Malta and Andorra in March 2016.
