= Dinamo Stadium (Chișinău) =

- Stadionul Dinamo
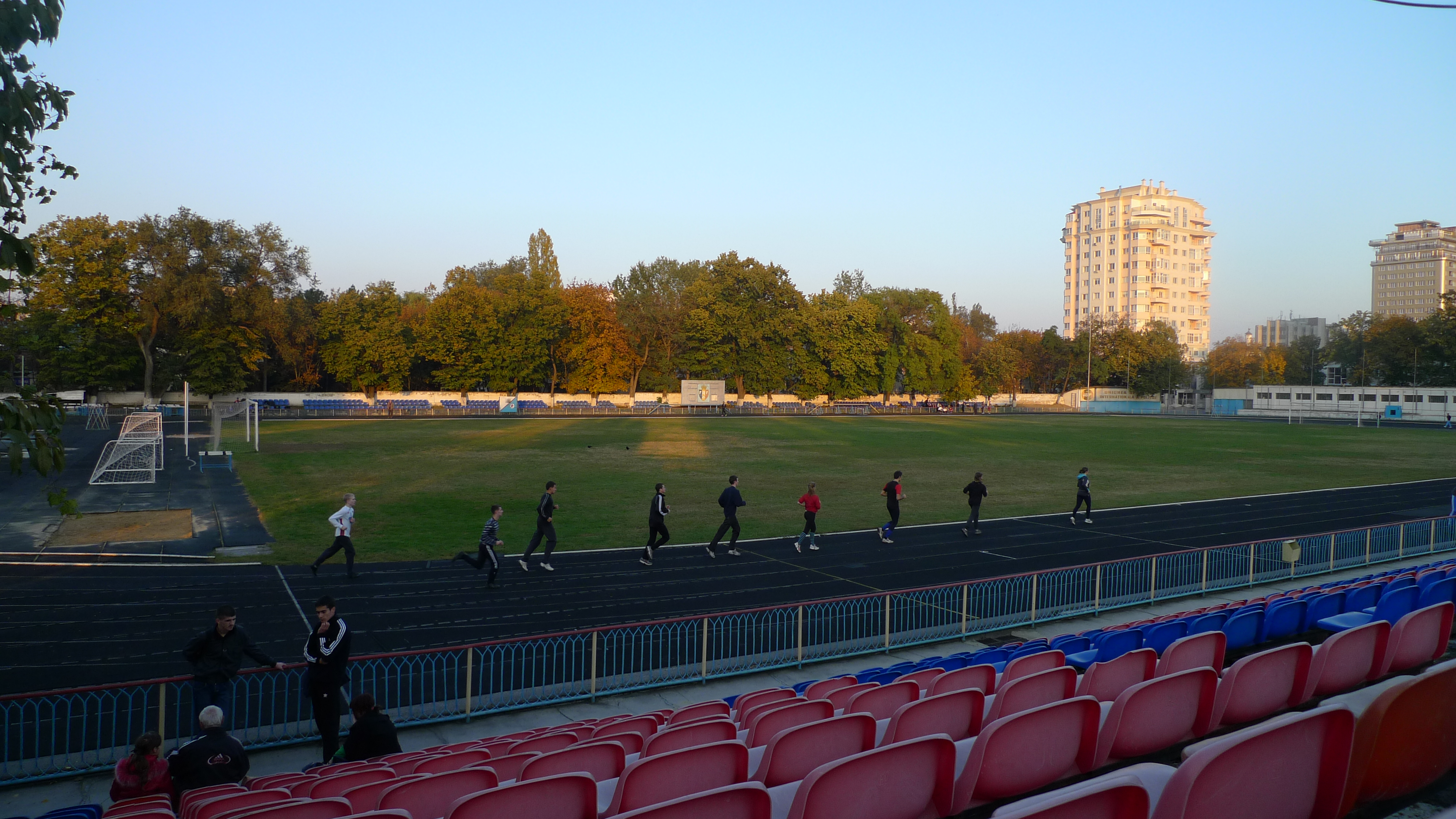
- The stadium in 2010
- Interactive map of Dinamo Stadium
- Former names: King Ferdinand I Stadium
- Address: 106 Shchusev Street; Chișinău; Moldova
- Coordinates: 47.026665°N 28.8191128°E
- Capacity: 2,900
- Surface: Grass
- Field size: 105 x 68 m

Tenants
- FC Politehnica Chişinău; FC Dacia Chişinău; FC Academia UTM Chişinău

Stadionul Dinamo is a multi-use stadium in Chişinău, Moldova. It is currently used mostly for football matches and is the home ground of FC Politehnica Chişinău. The stadium holds 2,900 people.

=== History ===
Stadionul Dinamo, as it is known now, was built during the interwar period, probably during 1920-1927, as its first name suggests that it was built during Ferdinand I of Romania's reign.
