= Victor Bulat =

Moldovan professional football player

Personal information
- Date of birth: 5 January 1985 (age 41)
- Position: Midfielder

Team information
- Current team: FC Tiraspol
- Number: 33

Senior career*
Years	Team	Apps	(Gls)
2003–2004	Agro Chişinău	19	(0)
2004–2008	Tiligul-Tiras	100	(11)
2008–2010	Dacia Chişinău	73	(6)
2011	Yenisey Krasnoyarsk	13	(0)
2012–2014	Tiraspol	64	(10)

International career^{‡}
2008–	Moldova	8	(0)
- * Club domestic league appearances and goals as of 31 January 2014 ‡ National team caps and goals as of 24 January 2010

Victor Bulat (born 5 January 1985) is a Moldovan professional football player. Currently, he plays for FC Tiraspol.
