= Stadionul Orășenesc (Rîbnița) =

- Interactive map of Stadionul Orășenesc
- Location: Rîbnița, Moldova
- Coordinates: 47.7745613°N 29.0043086°E
- Capacity: 4,500
- Surface: grass

Tenant
- Iskra Rîbnița

Stadionul Orășenesc (Russian: Городской стадион, romanized: Gorodskoy stadion) is a multi-use stadium in Rîbnița, Moldova. It is currently used mostly for football matches and served as the home for Iskra-Stali Rîbnița of the Moldovan National Division. The stadium has a capacity of 4,500 spectators.
