= Oleksandr Zgura =

Ukrainian footballer

Oleksandr Zghura
Personal information
- Full name: Oleksandr Oleksandrovych Zghura
- Date of birth: 20 August 1985 (age 41)
- Place of birth: Odesa, Ukrainian SSR, Soviet Union
- Height: 1.65 m (5 ft 5 in)
- Position: Striker

Team information
- Current team: FC Kyzylzhar

Senior career*
Years	Team	Apps	(Gls)
2002–2004	FC Chornomorets Odesa	50	(9)
2002–2006	FC Chornomorets-2 Odesa	10	(0)
2007	FC Digital Odesa	?	(?)
2007–2008	FC Dnister Ovidiopol	37	(11)
2008	FC Zirka Kirovohrad	17	(2)
2009–2010	FC Dacia Chişinău	34	(13)
2010–2011	FC Zakarpattia Uzhhorod	3	(0)
2010–2011	→ FSC Prykarpattya Ivano-Frankivsk (loan)	18	(3)
2011–2012	FC Vostok	12	(3)
2013–	FC Kyzylzhar		
- * Club domestic league appearances and goals as of 13 May 2013

Oleksandr Zghura (Ukrainian: Олександр Олександрович Згура; born 20 August 1985) is a Ukrainian footballer currently under contract for FC Kyzylzhar in the Kazakhstan First Division.
