= Eugen Matiughin =

Moldovan footballer

Personal information
- Date of birth: 31 October 1981 (age 45)
- Place of birth: Moldova
- Height: 1.85 m (6 ft 1 in)
- Position: Goalkeeper

Senior career*
Years	Team	Apps	(Gls)
2000–2005	Tiligul Tiraspol	78	(0)
2005–2007	Nistru Otaci	30	(0)
2007–2008	Tiligul Tiraspol	28	(0)
2008–2009	Banants Yerevan	21	(0)
2009–2014	Dacia Chişinău	93	(0)
2014–2015	Dinamo-Auto Tiraspol	11	(0)

International career^{‡}
2003–2010	Moldova	3	(0)
- * Club domestic league appearances and goals as of 19 July 2015 ‡ National team caps and goals as of 19 July 2015

Eugen Matiughin (born 31 October 1981) is a Moldovan former international footballer who last played for Dinamo-Auto Tiraspol.
