= Ghenadie Moșneaga =

Moldovan footballer

Personal information
- Full name: Ghenadie Moșneaga
- Date of birth: 25 April 1985 (age 41)
- Place of birth: Chișinău, Moldovan SSR, Soviet Union
- Height: 1.85 m (6 ft 1 in)
- Position: Goalkeeper

Senior career*
Years	Team	Apps	(Gls)
2009–2011	Dacia Chișinău	31	(0)
2011–2012	Sfîntul Gheorghe	24	(0)
2009–2012	Zimbru Chișinău	4	(0)
2012	Dacia Chișinău	0	(0)
2012–2013	Speranța Crihana Veche	11	(0)
2013–2014	Dacia Chișinău	9	(0)
2014	Zaria Bălți	15	(0)
2015	Andijan	28	(0)
2016–2018	Dinamo-Auto Tiraspol	34	(0)
- * Club domestic league appearances and goals

Ghenadie Moșneaga (born 25 April 1985, Chișinău, Moldavian SSR) is a Moldavian football goalkeeper.

== Career ==
He began his career in 2009 at Dacia Chișinău. After playing two seasons he moved to Sfîntul Gheorghe. In 2015, he signed a contract with Andijan.

== Honours ==
Dacia

- Moldovan National Division (1): 2010-11
- Moldovan Cup runners-up (1): 2009–10
