= List of Latvian football transfers summer 2014 =

This is a list of Latvian football transfers in the 2014 summer transfer window by club. Only transfers of the Virsliga are included.

All transfers mentioned are shown in the references at the bottom of the page. If you wish to insert a transfer that isn't mentioned there, please add a reference.

== Latvian Higher League ==
=== Ventspils ===
In: Note: Flags indicate national team as defined under FIFA eligibility rules; some limited exceptions apply. Players may hold more than one non-FIFA nationality.

| No. | Pos. | Nation | Player |
|---|---|---|---|
| — | DF | LVA | Renārs Rode (from (Czech Republic) Teplice) |
| — | DF | LVA | Alans Siņeļņikovs (from (Czech Republic) Baník Ostrava) |
| — | MF | LVA | Daniils Ulimbaševs (from Jūrmala) |
| — | FW | LVA | Ģirts Karlsons (from (Belarus) Neman Grodno) |
| — | FW | MTN | Cheikh Saad (from (Spain) Atlético Monzón) |

Out: Note: Flags indicate national team as defined under FIFA eligibility rules; some limited exceptions apply. Players may hold more than one non-FIFA nationality.

| No. | Pos. | Nation | Player |
|---|---|---|---|
| 8 | MF | LVA | Visvaldis Ignatāns (on loan to Daugava Daugavpils) |
| 11 | MF | LVA | Edgars Vērdiņš (on loan to Daugava Daugavpils) |
| 15 | MF | LVA | Oļegs Žatkins (to Daugava Daugavpils) |
| 19 | DF | ESP | Kiko Insa (to (England) Oxford City) |
| 20 | FW | RUS | Vadim Yanchuk (released) |
| 33 | FW | LVA | Kaspars Svārups (on loan to (Poland) Nadwiślan Góra) |

=== Skonto ===
In: Note: Flags indicate national team as defined under FIFA eligibility rules; some limited exceptions apply. Players may hold more than one non-FIFA nationality.

| No. | Pos. | Nation | Player |

Out: Note: Flags indicate national team as defined under FIFA eligibility rules; some limited exceptions apply. Players may hold more than one non-FIFA nationality.

| No. | Pos. | Nation | Player |
|---|---|---|---|
| 3 | DF | GAM | Ali Ceesay (released) |
| 4 | DF | LVA | Sergejs Kožans (to (Poland) GKS Tychy) |
| 5 | MF | LVA | Juris Laizāns (retired) |
| 6 | MF | AZE | Murad Iskandarli (released) |
| 10 | MF | TKM | Ruslan Mingazow (to (Czech Republic) Baumit Jablonec) |
| 14 | FW | LVA | Valērijs Šabala (loan return to (Belgium) Club Brugge) |
| 21 | MF | RUS | Dmitry Starodub (released) |
| 28 | FW | GEO | Levan Tchatchiashvili (released) |

=== Daugava Daugavpils ===
In: Note: Flags indicate national team as defined under FIFA eligibility rules; some limited exceptions apply. Players may hold more than one non-FIFA nationality.

| No. | Pos. | Nation | Player |
|---|---|---|---|
| — | DF | LVA | Pāvels Ostrovskis (from BFC Daugavpils) |
| — | DF | UKR | Dmytro Kushnirov (from (Ukraine) Dynamo-2 Kyiv) |
| — | DF | UKR | Rizvan Ablitarov (from (Ukraine) Sevastopol) |
| — | MF | LVA | Visvaldis Ignatāns (on loan from Ventspils) |
| — | MF | LVA | Edgars Vērdiņš (on loan from Ventspils) |
| — | MF | LVA | Oļegs Žatkins (from Ventspils) |
| — | MF | UKR | Pavlo Gryshchenko (from (Ukraine) Bukovyna Chernivtsi) |
| — | MF | UKR | Valeriy Kutsenko (from (Belarus) Minsk) |
| — | FW | UKR | Ihor Sikorskyi (from (Ukraine) Stal Alchevsk) |
| — | FW | LVA | Žanis Zubovs (from Rīgas Futbola skola) |

Out: Note: Flags indicate national team as defined under FIFA eligibility rules; some limited exceptions apply. Players may hold more than one non-FIFA nationality.

| No. | Pos. | Nation | Player |
|---|---|---|---|
| 3 | FW | AZE | Murad Hüseynov (released) |
| 10 | FW | GEO | Jamal Jaliashvili (released) |
| 10 | MF | UKR | Ihor Sikorskyi (to (Ukraine) Helios Kharkiv) |
| 13 | DF | GEO | Giorgi Khumarashvili (released) |
| 19 | MF | RUS | Ilia Bogdanov (released) |
| 24 | DF | LVA | Aleksandrs Ivanovs (released) |

=== Daugava Rīga ===
In: Note: Flags indicate national team as defined under FIFA eligibility rules; some limited exceptions apply. Players may hold more than one non-FIFA nationality.

| No. | Pos. | Nation | Player |
|---|---|---|---|
| — | DF | SEN | Emmanuel Mendy (from (Georgia (country)) Dinamo Tbilisi) |
| — | DF | LVA | Oskars Priedēns (from Daugava Rīga-2) |
| — | DF | LVA | Raivis Šonmanis (from Daugava Rīga-2) |
| — | MF | LVA | Alekss Regža (from (Germany) Wuppertaler SV) |
| — | MF | LVA | Vitālijs Topčijevs (from Daugava Rīga-2) |
| — | MF | LVA | Rihards Tomingass (from Daugava Rīga-2) |
| — | FW | BRA | Vitor Flora (from (Brazil) Francana) |
| — | FW | SEN | Keba Gassama (from (Italy) Comprensorio Montalto) |
| — | FW | LVA | Aleksejs Koļesņikovs (from (Poland) Stal Rzeszów) |
| — | FW | LVA | Emīls Knapšis (from Liepāja) |
| — | FW | LVA | Ruslans Keirāns (from Daugava Rīga-2) |
| — | FW | LVA | Reinis Grabovskis (from Daugava Rīga-2) |

Out: Note: Flags indicate national team as defined under FIFA eligibility rules; some limited exceptions apply. Players may hold more than one non-FIFA nationality.

| No. | Pos. | Nation | Player |
|---|---|---|---|
| 11 | FW | LVA | Verners Apiņš (to Gulbene) |
| 22 | MF | LVA | Edgars Kārkliņš (on loan to Jūrmala) |
| 32 | GK | LTU | Emilijus Zubas (on loan to (Poland) GKS Bełchatów, previously on loan to (Denmark) Viborg FF) |
| 33 | DF | LTU | Valdemar Borovskij (to (Lithuania) Šiauliai) |
| 97 | DF | LVA | Kārlis Kņūts (to 1625 Liepāja) |

=== Liepāja ===
In: Note: Flags indicate national team as defined under FIFA eligibility rules; some limited exceptions apply. Players may hold more than one non-FIFA nationality.

| No. | Pos. | Nation | Player |
|---|---|---|---|
| — | GK | LVA | Artūrs Vaičulis (from (Lithuania) Kruoja Pakruojis) |
| — | DF | LVA | Deniss Ivanovs (from (Romania) Botoșani) |
| — | DF | LVA | Pāvels Mihadjuks (from Jūrmala) |
| — | MF | LVA | Dmitrijs Hmizs (from Spartaks) |
| — | MF | LVA | Roberts Savaļnieks (from (Poland) Jagiellonia Białystok) |

Out: Note: Flags indicate national team as defined under FIFA eligibility rules; some limited exceptions apply. Players may hold more than one non-FIFA nationality.

| No. | Pos. | Nation | Player |
|---|---|---|---|
| 2 | DF | LVA | Madis Miķelsons (on loan to 1625 Liepāja) |
| 4 | DF | JPN | Keisuke Hoshino (released) |
| 5 | DF | LVA | Agris Otaņķis (on loan to 1625 Liepāja) |
| 11 | DF | LVA | Juris Kučma (on loan to 1625 Liepāja) |
| 12 | GK | LVA | Toms Vīksna (on loan to (Cyprus) Akritas Chlorakas) |
| 18 | FW | LVA | Emīls Knapšis (to Daugava Rīga) |
| 38 | DF | SVK | Ivan Pecha (to (Romania) Oțelul Galați) |

=== Jūrmala ===
In: Note: Flags indicate national team as defined under FIFA eligibility rules; some limited exceptions apply. Players may hold more than one non-FIFA nationality.

| No. | Pos. | Nation | Player |
|---|---|---|---|
| — | DF | LVA | Deniss Sokoļskis (from (Sweden) Härnösands FF) |
| — | DF | RUS | Kirill Korban (free agent) |
| — | DF | GHA | Richmond Nketiah (from (Ghana) Medeama) |
| — | DF | LVA | Juris Macuks (from Olaine) |
| — | MF | GEO | Giorgi Diakvnishvili (from Jelgava) |
| — | MF | LVA | Edgars Kārkliņš (on loan from Daugava Rīga) |
| — | MF | UKR | Oleksiy Tyshchenko (from (Ukraine) Tavriya Simferopol) |
| — | MF | GHA | Sekyi Quaye (from (Ghana) New Edubiase United) |
| — | MF | EST | Tauno Mõttus (from (Estonia) Puuma Tallinn) |
| — | FW | ARG | Nicolás Abot (from (Bolivia) Club Blooming) |
| — | FW | BIH | Denis Bosnjak (from (Croatia) Pula ICI) |
| — | FW | LVA | Maksims Miskovs (from Skonto-2) |
| — | FW | LVA | Elvis Studāns (from Skonto-2) |

Out: Note: Flags indicate national team as defined under FIFA eligibility rules; some limited exceptions apply. Players may hold more than one non-FIFA nationality.

| No. | Pos. | Nation | Player |
|---|---|---|---|
| 2 | MF | LVA | Daniils Ulimbaševs (to Ventspils) |
| 3 | DF | LVA | Pāvels Mihadjuks (to Liepāja) |
| 8 | DF | ARG | Nahuel Jesus Guerrero (to (Peru) San Simón de Moquegua) |
| 11 | FW | ARG | Lucas Trecarichi (released) |
| 14 | MF | LVA | Maksims Rafaļskis (to (Poland) Wigry Suwałki) |
| 15 | MF | PAR | Orlando Bordón (to (Argentina) CD Comercio) |
| 17 | DF | ARG | Daniel Romero (released) |
| 19 | FW | LVA | Ingmārs Andris Briškens (released) |
| 20 | DF | LVA | Andrejs Panasjuks (released) |
| 23 | FW | SUI | Kevin Gissi (released) |
| 25 | FW | ESP | Juanma (released) |
| 71 | GK | LVA | Igors Labuts (to (Portugal) Atlético CP) |
| 91 | FW | LVA | Artjoms Loginovs (to METTA/LU) |

=== Spartaks ===
In: Note: Flags indicate national team as defined under FIFA eligibility rules; some limited exceptions apply. Players may hold more than one non-FIFA nationality.

| No. | Pos. | Nation | Player |
|---|---|---|---|
| — | GK | LVA | Alvis Bukšs (from Jūrmala-2) |
| — | DF | LVA | Aleksandrs Bendorjus (from Jūrmala-2) |
| — | DF | UKR | Vitaliy Fedoriv (from (Ukraine) Kryvbas Kryvyi Rih) |
| — | MF | FIN | Moshtagh Yaghoubi (loan return from (Russia) Dynamo Moscow) |
| — | MF | UKR | Kostyantyn Kravchenko (from (Ukraine) Illichivets Mariupol) |
| — | MF | UKR | Ivan Pylypchuk (from (Ukraine) Ajax Shakhtyorsk) |
| — | MF | LVA | Artūrs Burņins (from Jūrmala-2) |
| — | MF | LVA | Vladimirs Nosiks (from Jūrmala-2) |
| — | FW | LVA | Elvis Stuglis (from METTA/LU) |
| — | FW | LVA | Aleksandrs Briļs (from Jūrmala-2) |

Out: Note: Flags indicate national team as defined under FIFA eligibility rules; some limited exceptions apply. Players may hold more than one non-FIFA nationality.

| No. | Pos. | Nation | Player |
|---|---|---|---|
| 3 | DF | RUS | Nikita Cherepanov (released) |
| 10 | FW | LVA | Edgars Gauračs (on loan to (Switzerland) Aarau) |
| 14 | MF | BIH | Marko Perišić (to (Libya) Al-Ahly Benghazi) |
| 16 | MF | LVA | Dmitrijs Hmizs (to Liepāja) |
| 27 | FW | RUS | Aleksei Sapogov (released) |
| 34 | MF | COL | Peter Dominguez (to (Colombia) Once Caldas) |
| 77 | FW | GHA | Patrick Twumasi (on loan to (Kazakhstan) Astana, previously on loan to (Russia) Amkar Perm) |

=== Jelgava ===
In: Note: Flags indicate national team as defined under FIFA eligibility rules; some limited exceptions apply. Players may hold more than one non-FIFA nationality.

| No. | Pos. | Nation | Player |
|---|---|---|---|
| — | GK | LVA | Mārcis Melecis (from Auda) |
| — | DF | LVA | Igors Savčenkovs (from (Georgia (country)) Torpedo Kutaisi) |
| — | DF | CYP | Antreas Themistokleous (from (Cyprus) Olympiakos Nicosia) |
| — | MF | NGA | Kennedy Eriba (from (Finland) TPS Turku) |
| — | MF | POL | Dariusz Łatka (from (Poland) Podbeskidzie Bielsko-Biała) |

Out: Note: Flags indicate national team as defined under FIFA eligibility rules; some limited exceptions apply. Players may hold more than one non-FIFA nationality.

| No. | Pos. | Nation | Player |
|---|---|---|---|
| 2 | DF | LVA | Deniss Petrenko (to METTA/LU) |
| 9 | MF | LVA | Vadims Žuļevs (to (Hungary) Lombard-Pápa) |
| 17 | DF | LVA | Aleksandrs Baturinskis (to (Germany) Teutonia Ottensen) |
| 22 | MF | GEO | Giorgi Diakvnishvili (to Jūrmala) |

=== METTA/LU ===
In: Note: Flags indicate national team as defined under FIFA eligibility rules; some limited exceptions apply. Players may hold more than one non-FIFA nationality.

| No. | Pos. | Nation | Player |
|---|---|---|---|
| — | DF | LVA | Deniss Petrenko (from Jelgava) |
| — | MF | LVA | Valdis Jansons (from Auda) |
| — | FW | LVA | Artjoms Loginovs (from Jūrmala) |

Out: Note: Flags indicate national team as defined under FIFA eligibility rules; some limited exceptions apply. Players may hold more than one non-FIFA nationality.

| No. | Pos. | Nation | Player |
|---|---|---|---|
| 12 | FW | LVA | Elvis Stuglis (to Spartaks) |

=== BFC Daugavpils ===
In: Note: Flags indicate national team as defined under FIFA eligibility rules; some limited exceptions apply. Players may hold more than one non-FIFA nationality.

| No. | Pos. | Nation | Player |
|---|---|---|---|
| — | DF | CMR | William Michel Pegou (from (France) Olimpique Strasbourg) |
| — | DF | LVA | Jevgēņijs Bragins (free agent) |
| — | DF | JPN | Kiyoshi Nakatani (from (Poland) Concordia Elbląg) |
| — | FW | LVA | Daniels Jakovļevs (from (Italy) AlbinoLeffe) |
| — | FW | UKR | Ivan Lukanyuk (from (Ukraine) Karpaty Lviv) |

Out: Note: Flags indicate national team as defined under FIFA eligibility rules; some limited exceptions apply. Players may hold more than one non-FIFA nationality.

| No. | Pos. | Nation | Player |
|---|---|---|---|
| 2 | DF | RUS | Elmin Gasanov (to (Lithuania) Šiauliai) |
| 3 | DF | LVA | Pāvels Ostrovskis (to Daugava Daugavpils) |
| 4 | DF | LVA | Antonijs Černomordijs (on loan to (Poland) Lech Poznań-2) |
| 9 | FW | LVA | Vladislavs Fjodorovs (on loan to (Poland) Lech Poznań-2) |
| 12 | DF | JPN | Yuta Kinowaki (released) |
| 14 | DF | JPN | Taisei Yamazaki (released) |
