= List of Latvian football transfers summer 2013 =

This is a list of Latvian football transfers in the 2013 summer transfer window by club. Only transfers of the Virslīga and 1. līga are included.

All transfers mentioned are shown in the references at the bottom of the page. If you wish to insert a transfer that isn't mentioned there, please add a reference.

== Latvian Higher League ==
=== Daugava Daugavpils ===
In: Note: Flags indicate national team as defined under FIFA eligibility rules; some limited exceptions apply. Players may hold more than one non-FIFA nationality.

No.	Pos.	Nation	Player
1	GK	LAT	Aleksandrs Vlasovs (from Jelgava)
2	MF	LAT	Jans Radevičs (loan return from Ilūkste)
4	DF	GEO	Giorgi Chikhradze (from (Georgia (country)) Liakhvi Achabeti)
15	MF	ROU	Bogdan Spătaru (from (Romania) Păpăuţi)
16	MF	LAT	Aleksandrs Solovjovs (from Spartaks)
18	FW	GEO	Mamuka Ghonghadze (loan return from Ilūkste)
20	DF	GEO	Bidzina Tsintsadze (from (Georgia (country)) Torpedo Kutaisi)
23	MF	ROU	Dragoș Militaru (from (Romania) Damila Măciuca)
24	DF	LAT	Dmitrijs Halvitovs (from Spartaks)
—	DF	GEO	Giorgi Khumarashvili (from Tukums 2000)
—	MF	LAT	Rojs Grauze (from BFC Daugava Daugavpils)
—	FW	LAT	Verners Zalaks (from BFC Daugava Daugavpils)
—	FW	LAT	Ričards Grauze (from BFC Daugava Daugavpils)

Out: Note: Flags indicate national team as defined under FIFA eligibility rules; some limited exceptions apply. Players may hold more than one non-FIFA nationality.

No.	Pos.	Nation	Player
1	GK	LAT	Igors Labuts (on loan to Ilūkste)
2	MF	JPN	Koichiro Iizuka (released)
4	DF	NGR	Joseph Enakarhire (released)
15	FW	LAT	Vladimirs Volkovs (on loan to Ilūkste)
22	DF	LAT	Jevgēņijs Simonovs (on loan to Ilūkste)
—	DF	GEO	Giorgi Khumarashvili (on loan to Ilūkste)

=== Skonto ===
In: Note: Flags indicate national team as defined under FIFA eligibility rules; some limited exceptions apply. Players may hold more than one non-FIFA nationality.

No.	Pos.	Nation	Player
13	MF	GEO	Irakli Klimiashvili (from (Georgia (country)) Sioni Bolnisi)
15	MF	LAT	Artūrs Strazdiņš (from Skonto-2)
17	DF	LAT	Ņikita Bērenfelds (from Skonto-2)
18	DF	LAT	Dāvis Sandis Strods (from Skonto-2)
21	DF	LAT	Nauris Bulvītis (from Spartaks)
27	DF	GEO	Lasha Dvali (from (Georgia (country)) Dinamo Tbilisi)
27	DF	LAT	Sergejs Kožans (from (Belarus) Slavia Mozyr)
—	DF	LAT	Artjoms Jakuševs (from Skonto-2)
—	DF	LAT	Vladislavs Sorokins (from Skonto-2)
—	MF	LAT	Eduards Emsis (from Skonto-2)
—	FW	LAT	Jurijs Krivošeja (from Skonto-2)

Out: Note: Flags indicate national team as defined under FIFA eligibility rules; some limited exceptions apply. Players may hold more than one non-FIFA nationality.

No.	Pos.	Nation	Player
15	MF	JPN	Shotaro Okada (to (Poland) LKS Nieciecza)
—	MF	LAT	Andrejs Siņicins (to Spartaks)
—	MF	PAN	Julio Segundo (to (Greece) Veria)
—	MF	RUS	Viktor Lipin (to (Russia) Sibir-2 Novosibirsk)

=== Ventspils ===
In: Note: Flags indicate national team as defined under FIFA eligibility rules; some limited exceptions apply. Players may hold more than one non-FIFA nationality.

No.	Pos.	Nation	Player
6	MF	LAT	Dāvis Indrāns (from Ventspils-2)

Out: Note: Flags indicate national team as defined under FIFA eligibility rules; some limited exceptions apply. Players may hold more than one non-FIFA nationality.

No.	Pos.	Nation	Player
11	MF	LAT	Edgars Vērdiņš (on loan to Jelgava)
16	GK	LAT	Valentīns Raļkevičs (on loan to (Lithuania) Tauras Tauragė)
21	FW	LAT	Vladislavs Kozlovs (released)
—	FW	LAT	Kaspars Svārups (on loan to Jūrmala, previously on loan at Ilūkste)

=== Liepājas Metalurgs ===
In: Note: Flags indicate national team as defined under FIFA eligibility rules; some limited exceptions apply. Players may hold more than one non-FIFA nationality.

No.	Pos.	Nation	Player
13	MF	LAT	Krišs Kārkliņš (from Liepājas Metalurgs-2)
23	MF	LAT	Toms Gucs (from Liepājas Metalurgs-2)
31	GK	LAT	Toms Vīksna (from Varavīksne)
87	FW	LAT	Emīls Knapšis (from Liepājas Metalurgs-2)

Out: Note: Flags indicate national team as defined under FIFA eligibility rules; some limited exceptions apply. Players may hold more than one non-FIFA nationality.

No.	Pos.	Nation	Player
12	GK	LAT	Pāvels Doroševs (to (Azerbaijan) Neftchi Baku)
17	MF	LAT	Andrejs Prohorenkovs (to Jūrmala)
23	FW	AZE	Vugar Askerov (to (Azerbaijan) Sumgayit)
30	GK	LAT	Edgars Potapenko (to Varavīksne)

=== Spartaks ===
In: Note: Flags indicate national team as defined under FIFA eligibility rules; some limited exceptions apply. Players may hold more than one non-FIFA nationality.

No.	Pos.	Nation	Player
1	GK	LAT	Roberts Ozols (from Liepājas Metalurgs-2)
3	DF	LAT	Artjoms Šatskihs (from FK Spartaks-2)
4	DF	RUS	Zhantemir Soblirov (from (Lithuania) Kruoja Pakruojis)
7	FW	LAT	Ričards Korzāns (from FK Spartaks-2)
10	MF	LAT	Andrejs Siņicins (from Skonto)
14	FW	ESA	Ricardo Ulloa (on loan from (El Salvador) FAS)
27	DF	LAT	Kārlis Kņūts (from Liepājas Metalurgs-2)
30	GK	LAT	Jānis Skābardis (on loan from Auda)
34	MF	LAT	Aleksejs Višņakovs (from (Russia) Baltika Kaliningrad)
—	MF	LAT	Ņikita Popovs (from FK Spartaks-2)

Out: Note: Flags indicate national team as defined under FIFA eligibility rules; some limited exceptions apply. Players may hold more than one non-FIFA nationality.

No.	Pos.	Nation	Player
1	GK	LAT	Jevgēņijs Sazonovs (to Daugava Rīga)
4	DF	LAT	Nauris Bulvītis (to Skonto)
7	MF	LAT	Deniss Tarasovs (released)
10	MF	LAT	Artjoms Lonščakovs (to (Germany) Magdeburg II)
13	MF	LAT	Jevgēņijs Kosmačovs (to Tukums 2000)
14	FW	UKR	Andriy Antsybor (released)
20	DF	LAT	Dmitrijs Halvitovs (to Daugava Daugavpils)
23	MF	LAT	Deniels Calkovskis (to Jūrmala)
27	MF	LAT	Rihards Ivanovs (to Rēzekne)
32	MF	LAT	Viktors Morozs (to (Belarus) Naftan Novopolotsk)
34	MF	LAT	Aleksandrs Solovjovs (to Daugava Daugavpils)
34	MF	LAT	Aleksejs Višņakovs (to (Poland) Widzew Łódź)
77	FW	GHA	Patrick Twumasi (on loan to (Kazakhstan) Astana)
—	MF	LAT	Staņislavs Kolomicevs (to Jūrmala-2)
—	FW	COL	Jairo Mosquera (to (Colombia) Real Cartagena, previously on loan at (Russia) Salyut Belgorod)
—	FW	LAT	Artūrs Krasnočubs (to Jūrmala-2)

=== Jūrmala ===
In: Note: Flags indicate national team as defined under FIFA eligibility rules; some limited exceptions apply. Players may hold more than one non-FIFA nationality.

No.	Pos.	Nation	Player
2	MF	LAT	Romāns Geiko (from Jūrmala-2)
5	MF	RUS	Vladimir Barmin (on loan from (Russia) Mordovia Saransk)
9	MF	LAT	Deniels Calkovskis (from Spartaks)
11	FW	LAT	Kaspars Svārups (on loan from Ventspils)
14	MF	LAT	Andrejs Prohorenkovs (from Liepājas Metalurgs)
15	MF	LAT	Daniils Ulimbaševs (from Ilūkste)
17	FW	POR	Paulo Bunze (from (Angola) Atlético Sport Aviação)
19	MF	JPN	Yusaku Toyoshima (from (Moldova) Olimpia Bălţi)
20	DF	RUS	Pavel Orlov (from (Russia) Mordovia Saransk)
23	FW	LAT	Kristaps Grebis (from Daugava Rīga)
—	FW	LAT	Ingmārs Briškens (from METTA-2)

Out: Note: Flags indicate national team as defined under FIFA eligibility rules; some limited exceptions apply. Players may hold more than one non-FIFA nationality.

No.	Pos.	Nation	Player
2	DF	RUS	Yuri Kulikov (to (Russia) Khimki)
5	MF	JPN	Keisuke Ogawa (to (Serbia) Sloboda Užice)
6	MF	RUS	Konstantin Belov (released)
7	MF	LAT	Sergejs Mišins (to Daugava Rīga)
8	MF	JPN	Takaya Kawanabe (to (Montenegro) Mladost Podgorica)
9	MF	LAT	Igors Aleksejevs (to Varavīksne)
10	FW	JPN	Hideaki Takeda (released)
17	MF	LAT	Jevgēņijs Golovins (to Varavīksne)
19	MF	LAT	Oskars Ikstens (released)
20	FW	LAT	Oļegs Malašenoks (to Jelgava)
25	DF	LAT	Romāns Gladiļins (to Varavīksne)
—	MF	LAT	Igors Barinovs (to Jelgava)

=== Jelgava ===
In: Note: Flags indicate national team as defined under FIFA eligibility rules; some limited exceptions apply. Players may hold more than one non-FIFA nationality.

No.	Pos.	Nation	Player
1	GK	LAT	Kaspars Ikstens (from (Iceland) Víkingur Ólafsvík)
3	DF	RUS	Alexander Lozovoy (from (Russia) Serp i Molot Moscow)
5	MF	LAT	Igors Barinovs (from Jūrmala)
17	MF	LAT	Normunds Kaļķis (from Jelgava-2)
18	FW	LAT	Vitālijs Abramovs (from Jelgava-2)
21	MF	LAT	Edgars Vērdiņš (on loan from Ventspils)
24	MF	LAT	Pāvels Hohlovs (unattached)
25	DF	FRA	Axel Morin (from (France) Maison Alfort)
85	MF	LAT	Gints Freimanis (from (Germany) Pommern Greifswald)
99	FW	LAT	Oļegs Malašenoks (from Jūrmala)

Out: Note: Flags indicate national team as defined under FIFA eligibility rules; some limited exceptions apply. Players may hold more than one non-FIFA nationality.

No.	Pos.	Nation	Player
1	GK	LAT	Aleksandrs Vlasovs (to Daugava Daugavpils)
5	DF	LAT	Dmitrijs Šiļuks (to Gulbene)
18	FW	LAT	Maksims Kamkins (to Rīgas Futbola skola)
21	MF	LAT	Daniels Vasiļjevs (to Tukums 2000)
24	DF	LAT	Alberts Bārbalis (to Gulbene)

=== METTA/LU ===
In: Note: Flags indicate national team as defined under FIFA eligibility rules; some limited exceptions apply. Players may hold more than one non-FIFA nationality.

No.	Pos.	Nation	Player
19	FW	LAT	Artis Jaudzems (from FS Metta-2)

Out: Note: Flags indicate national team as defined under FIFA eligibility rules; some limited exceptions apply. Players may hold more than one non-FIFA nationality.

No.	Pos.	Nation	Player
6	FW	LAT	Vents Vanags (to Auda)
9	FW	LAT	Jurijs Višņakovs (to Staiceles Bebri)
10	FW	LAT	Artūrs Blūms (released)
21	FW	LAT	Kalvis Grāveris (to FS Metta-2)

=== Daugava Rīga ===
In: Note: Flags indicate national team as defined under FIFA eligibility rules; some limited exceptions apply. Players may hold more than one non-FIFA nationality.

No.	Pos.	Nation	Player
11	MF	LAT	Sergejs Mišins (from Jūrmala)
16	GK	LAT	Jevgēņijs Sazonovs (from Spartaks)
17	MF	LAT	Andrejs Perepļotkins (from (Estonia) Narva Trans)
77	FW	LTU	Povilas Lukšys (from (Poland) Wigry Suwałki)

Out: Note: Flags indicate national team as defined under FIFA eligibility rules; some limited exceptions apply. Players may hold more than one non-FIFA nationality.

No.	Pos.	Nation	Player
4	DF	LAT	Aleksandrs Baturinskis (released)
10	MF	LTU	Ernestas Veliulis (on loan to (Lithuania) Atlantas)
16	GK	LAT	Vitālijs Artjomenko (on loan to (Lithuania) Dainava Alytus)
17	FW	LAT	Nikolajs Kozačuks (to (Poland) Górnik Łęczna)
23	FW	LAT	Kristaps Grebis (to Jūrmala)
69	FW	CRO	Tedi Surać (released)
77	DF	UKR	Oleh Solovych (released)
88	MF	LTU	Dominykas Galkevičius (to (Belarus) Naftan Novopolotsk)
—	GK	LTU	Emilijus Zubas (on loan to (Cyprus) AEK Larnaca, previously on loan at (Poland) GKS Bełchatów)

=== Ilūkste ===
In: Note: Flags indicate national team as defined under FIFA eligibility rules; some limited exceptions apply. Players may hold more than one non-FIFA nationality.

No.	Pos.	Nation	Player
4	DF	LAT	Jevgēņijs Simonovs (on loan from Daugava Daugavpils)
7	MF	GEO	Jamal Jaliashvili (unattached)
8	FW	LAT	Vladimirs Volkovs (on loan from Daugava Daugavpils)
11	MF	LAT	Elgars Romanovskis (unattached)
12	GK	LAT	Igors Labuts (on loan from Daugava Daugavpils)
19	MF	GEO	Giorgi Tukhashvili (from (Georgia (country)) Zooveti)
21	DF	GEO	Giorgi Khumarashvili (on loan from Daugava Daugavpils)
25	MF	LAT	Armīns Kaniņš (unattached)
—	DF	LAT	Jurijs Boruns (unattached)
—	FW	LAT	Toms Timšāns (unattached)

Out: Note: Flags indicate national team as defined under FIFA eligibility rules; some limited exceptions apply. Players may hold more than one non-FIFA nationality.

No.	Pos.	Nation	Player
2	FW	ISR	Alexander Davydov (released)
4	MF	JPN	Yoki Kumada (released)
7	MF	LAT	Daniils Ulimbaševs (to Jūrmala)
8	MF	LAT	Jans Radevičs (loan return to Daugava Daugavpils)
11	FW	LAT	Kaspars Svārups (loan return to Ventspils)
15	DF	LAT	Edijs Ivaško (to Tukums 2000)
16	GK	LAT	Georgijs Čižovs (to BFC Daugava Daugavpils)
18	DF	LAT	Aleksandrs Abramenko (to Tukums 2000)
21	FW	GEO	Mamuka Ghonghadze (loan return to Daugava Daugavpils)
25	DF	LAT	Deniss Sokoļskis (to Rēzekne)
—	DF	LAT	Dmitrijs Plukaitis (to Olaine)

== Latvian First League ==
=== Gulbene ===
In: Note: Flags indicate national team as defined under FIFA eligibility rules; some limited exceptions apply. Players may hold more than one non-FIFA nationality.

No.	Pos.	Nation	Player
—	DF	LAT	Alberts Bārbalis (from Jelgava)
—	DF	LAT	Dmitrijs Šiļuks (from Jelgava)
—	FW	LAT	Igors Kirillovs (unattached)

Out: Note: Flags indicate national team as defined under FIFA eligibility rules; some limited exceptions apply. Players may hold more than one non-FIFA nationality.

No.	Pos.	Nation	Player
—	MF	LAT	Deniss Ostrovskis (to Auda)
9	DF	LAT	Staņislavs Pihockis (to (Norway) Hammerfest Fotballklubb)

=== Liepājas Metalurgs-2 ===
In: Note: Flags indicate national team as defined under FIFA eligibility rules; some limited exceptions apply. Players may hold more than one non-FIFA nationality.

No.	Pos.	Nation	Player
3	MF	LAT	Filips Tīls (from Varavīksne)
12	GK	LAT	Igors Zubarevs (unattached)
16	FW	LAT	Daniils Hvoinickis (unattached)
17	MF	LAT	Toms Gucs (unattached)
20	FW	LAT	Arturs Kupčs (unattached)
—	GK	LAT	Miks Gucs (unattached)
—	DF	LAT	Jurijs Babenko (unattached)
—	DF	LAT	Andrejs Sergejevs (unattached)
—	MF	LAT	Devids Dobrecovs (unattached)
—	MF	LAT	Arturs Gross (unattached)
—	MF	LAT	Deniss Kurbatovs (unattached)

Out: Note: Flags indicate national team as defined under FIFA eligibility rules; some limited exceptions apply. Players may hold more than one non-FIFA nationality.

No.	Pos.	Nation	Player
2	MF	LAT	Krišs Kārkliņš (to Liepājas Metalurgs)
8	FW	LAT	Emīls Knapšis (to Liepājas Metalurgs)
17	MF	LAT	Toms Gucs (to Liepājas Metalurgs)
—	GK	LAT	Roberts Ozols (to Spartaks)
—	DF	LAT	Kārlis Kņūts (to Spartaks)
—	MF	LAT	Viktors Jefremovs (to Varavīksne)
—	FW	LAT	Arturs Liatukas (to Varavīksne)

=== Skonto-2 ===
In: Note: Flags indicate national team as defined under FIFA eligibility rules; some limited exceptions apply. Players may hold more than one non-FIFA nationality.

No.	Pos.	Nation	Player

Out: Note: Flags indicate national team as defined under FIFA eligibility rules; some limited exceptions apply. Players may hold more than one non-FIFA nationality.

No.	Pos.	Nation	Player
2	DF	LAT	Dāvis Sandis Strods (to Skonto)
4	DF	LAT	Vladislavs Sorokins (to Skonto)
5	DF	LAT	Ņikita Bērenfelds (to Skonto)
6	MF	LAT	Artūrs Strazdiņš (to Skonto)
15	DF	LAT	Artjoms Jakuševs (to Skonto)
18	MF	LAT	Eduards Emsis (to Skonto)
—	MF	LAT	Ņikita Kovaļonoks (to (Netherlands) ADO Den Haag)
—	MF	LAT	Daniels Bērenfelds (to Rīgas Futbola skola)
—	MF	LAT	Arkādijs Narčuks (to Rīgas Futbola skola)
—	MF	LAT	Ņikita Ivanovs (to Daugava-2 Rīga)
—	FW	LAT	Andrejs Cigaņiks (to (Germany) Bayer Leverkusen)
—	FW	LAT	Jurijs Krivošeja (to Skonto)

=== BFC Daugava Daugavpils ===
In: Note: Flags indicate national team as defined under FIFA eligibility rules; some limited exceptions apply. Players may hold more than one non-FIFA nationality.

No.	Pos.	Nation	Player
9	FW	LAT	Vadims Atamaņukovs (unattached)
20	FW	LAT	Vladislavs Fjodorovs (unattached)
—	GK	LAT	Georgijs Čižovs (from Ilūkste)
—	MF	JPN	Taniguchi Naoya (from (Poland) Arkonia Szczecin)

Out: Note: Flags indicate national team as defined under FIFA eligibility rules; some limited exceptions apply. Players may hold more than one non-FIFA nationality.

No.	Pos.	Nation	Player
—	MF	LAT	Rojs Grauze (to Daugava Daugavpils)
—	FW	LAT	Verners Zalaks (to Daugava Daugavpils)
—	FW	LAT	Ričards Grauze (to Daugava Daugavpils)
—	FW	LAT	Žanis Zubovs (to Rīgas Futbola skola)

=== Rīgas Futbola skola ===
In: Note: Flags indicate national team as defined under FIFA eligibility rules; some limited exceptions apply. Players may hold more than one non-FIFA nationality.

No.	Pos.	Nation	Player
5	MF	LAT	Arkādijs Narčuks (from Skonto-2)
22	MF	LAT	Daniels Bērenfelds (from Skonto-2)
—	DF	LAT	Dmitrijs Bučņevs (from Daugava-2 Rīga)
—	FW	LAT	Maksims Kamkins (from Jelgava)
—	FW	LAT	Žanis Zubovs (from BFC Daugava Daugavpils)
—	FW	LAT	Romāns Derbakovs (unattached)

Out: Note: Flags indicate national team as defined under FIFA eligibility rules; some limited exceptions apply. Players may hold more than one non-FIFA nationality.

No.	Pos.	Nation	Player

=== Ventspils-2 ===
In: Note: Flags indicate national team as defined under FIFA eligibility rules; some limited exceptions apply. Players may hold more than one non-FIFA nationality.

No.	Pos.	Nation	Player
1	GK	LAT	Reinis Reinholds (unattached)
2	DF	LAT	Rūdolfs Ratfelders (from Auda)
9	FW	LAT	Maksims Smirnovs (unattached)
17	MF	LTU	Arminas Lukoševičius (from (Lithuania) Sporto Perspektyvos)

Out: Note: Flags indicate national team as defined under FIFA eligibility rules; some limited exceptions apply. Players may hold more than one non-FIFA nationality.

No.	Pos.	Nation	Player
5	DF	LAT	Dāvis Daugavietis (to FS Metta-2)
7	MF	LAT	Maksims Vasiļjevs (released)
8	DF	LAT	Rihards Purmalis (to Tukums 2000)
9	FW	LAT	Raivis Vītolnieks (to Tukums 2000)
13	MF	LAT	Sandijs Joksts (to Tukums 2000)
14	MF	LAT	Dāvis Indrāns (to Ventspils)

=== Varavīksne ===
In: Note: Flags indicate national team as defined under FIFA eligibility rules; some limited exceptions apply. Players may hold more than one non-FIFA nationality.

No.	Pos.	Nation	Player
5	MF	LAT	Igors Aleksejevs (from Jūrmala)
6	MF	LAT	Jevgēņijs Golovins (from Jūrmala)
12	GK	LAT	Edgars Potapenko (from Liepājas Metalurgs)
14	MF	LAT	Viktors Jefremovs (from Liepājas Metalurgs-2)
17	DF	LAT	Romāns Gladiļins (from Jūrmala)
18	FW	LAT	Arturs Liatukas (from Liepājas Metalurgs-2)
20	DF	BRA	Alexandre Henrique da Silva (from (Lithuania) Granitas Klaipeda)

Out: Note: Flags indicate national team as defined under FIFA eligibility rules; some limited exceptions apply. Players may hold more than one non-FIFA nationality.

No.	Pos.	Nation	Player
8	MF	LAT	Filips Tīls (to Liepājas Metalurgs-2)
12	GK	LAT	Toms Vīksna (to Liepājas Metalurgs)

=== Valmiera ===
In: Note: Flags indicate national team as defined under FIFA eligibility rules; some limited exceptions apply. Players may hold more than one non-FIFA nationality.

No.	Pos.	Nation	Player
14	MF	LAT	Roberts Siksalietis (unattached)
16	GK	LAT	Elvis Mālmanis (unattached)
—	MF	LAT	Gints Dreija (unattached)

Out: Note: Flags indicate national team as defined under FIFA eligibility rules; some limited exceptions apply. Players may hold more than one non-FIFA nationality.

No.	Pos.	Nation	Player

=== Rēzekne ===
In: Note: Flags indicate national team as defined under FIFA eligibility rules; some limited exceptions apply. Players may hold more than one non-FIFA nationality.

No.	Pos.	Nation	Player
9	MF	LAT	Rihards Ivanovs (from Spartaks)
20	DF	LAT	Deniss Sokoļskis (from Ilūkste)

Out: Note: Flags indicate national team as defined under FIFA eligibility rules; some limited exceptions apply. Players may hold more than one non-FIFA nationality.

No.	Pos.	Nation	Player
—	MF	LAT	Mārtiņš Bojārs (to Jēkabpils)

=== METTA-2 ===
In: Note: Flags indicate national team as defined under FIFA eligibility rules; some limited exceptions apply. Players may hold more than one non-FIFA nationality.

No.	Pos.	Nation	Player
—	DF	LAT	Dāvis Daugavietis (from FK Ventspils-2)
—	FW	LAT	Kalvis Grāveris (from Metta/LU)

Out: Note: Flags indicate national team as defined under FIFA eligibility rules; some limited exceptions apply. Players may hold more than one non-FIFA nationality.

No.	Pos.	Nation	Player
6	FW	LAT	Ingmārs Briškens (to Jūrmala)
17	FW	LAT	Artis Jaudzems (to Metta/LU)
—	MF	LAT	Harijs Toms (to Upesciems)

=== Auda ===
In: Note: Flags indicate national team as defined under FIFA eligibility rules; some limited exceptions apply. Players may hold more than one non-FIFA nationality.

No.	Pos.	Nation	Player
—	DF	LAT	Maikls Poļakovs (unattached)
—	MF	LAT	Deniss Ostrovskis (from Gulbene)
—	FW	LAT	Vents Vanags (from METTA/LU)

Out: Note: Flags indicate national team as defined under FIFA eligibility rules; some limited exceptions apply. Players may hold more than one non-FIFA nationality.

No.	Pos.	Nation	Player
11	FW	LAT	Rūdolfs Ratfelders (to Ventspils-2)
18	MF	JPN	Shohei Okuno (to (Serbia) Sloboda Užice)
27	GK	LAT	Jānis Skābardis (on loan to Spartaks)

=== Tukums 2000/Salaspils ===
In: Note: Flags indicate national team as defined under FIFA eligibility rules; some limited exceptions apply. Players may hold more than one non-FIFA nationality.

No.	Pos.	Nation	Player
6	MF	LAT	Atis Kovaļovs (unattached)
7	MF	LAT	Jevgēņijs Kosmačovs (from Spartaks)
8	DF	LAT	Rihards Purmalis (from Ventspils-2)
10	FW	LAT	Raivis Vītolnieks (from Ventspils-2)
14	DF	LAT	Edijs Ivaško (from Ilūkste)
17	MF	LAT	Sandijs Joksts (from Ventspils-2)
22	MF	LAT	Daniels Vasiļjevs (from Jelgava)
25	DF	LAT	Aleksandrs Abramenko (from Ilūkste)

Out: Note: Flags indicate national team as defined under FIFA eligibility rules; some limited exceptions apply. Players may hold more than one non-FIFA nationality.

No.	Pos.	Nation	Player
5	DF	LAT	Edijs Joksts (to (England) Oldham Athletic)
13	DF	GEO	Giorgi Khumarashvili (to Daugava Daugavpils)

=== Jelgava-2 ===
In: Note: Flags indicate national team as defined under FIFA eligibility rules; some limited exceptions apply. Players may hold more than one non-FIFA nationality.

No.	Pos.	Nation	Player

Out: Note: Flags indicate national team as defined under FIFA eligibility rules; some limited exceptions apply. Players may hold more than one non-FIFA nationality.

No.	Pos.	Nation	Player
8	MF	LAT	Normunds Kaļķis (to Jelgava)
15	FW	LAT	Vitālijs Abramovs (to Jelgava)

=== Jēkabpils ===
In: Note: Flags indicate national team as defined under FIFA eligibility rules; some limited exceptions apply. Players may hold more than one non-FIFA nationality.

No.	Pos.	Nation	Player
21	MF	LAT	Anatolijs Grigorjevs (unattached)
34	MF	LAT	Mārtiņš Bojārs (from Rēzekne)
—	MF	LAT	Rolands Gailis (unattached)
—	MF	LAT	Ruslans Kazarcevs (unattached)
—	DF	LAT	Dmitrijs Kohans (unattached)
—	MF	LAT	Andrejs Ņikitins (unattached)
—	MF	LAT	Aleksandrs Škoļņikovs (unattached)
—	FW	LAT	Aleksandrs Abašins (unattached)

Out: Note: Flags indicate national team as defined under FIFA eligibility rules; some limited exceptions apply. Players may hold more than one non-FIFA nationality.

No.	Pos.	Nation	Player

=== Daugava-2 Rīga ===
In: Note: Flags indicate national team as defined under FIFA eligibility rules; some limited exceptions apply. Players may hold more than one non-FIFA nationality.

No.	Pos.	Nation	Player
5	DF	LAT	Marks Molčanovs (from RTU)
27	MF	LAT	Ņikita Ivanovs (from Skonto-2)

Out: Note: Flags indicate national team as defined under FIFA eligibility rules; some limited exceptions apply. Players may hold more than one non-FIFA nationality.

No.	Pos.	Nation	Player
12	GK	LAT	Kristaps Zommers (to (Denmark) AGF Aarhaus)
24	DF	LAT	Dmitrijs Bučņevs (to Rīgas Futbola skola)

=== Jūrmala-2 ===
In: Note: Flags indicate national team as defined under FIFA eligibility rules; some limited exceptions apply. Players may hold more than one non-FIFA nationality.

No.	Pos.	Nation	Player
—	GK	LAT	Edgars Dmitrijevs (unattached)
—	DF	LAT	Mihails Poļakovs (unattached)
—	MF	LAT	Staņislavs Kolomicevs (from Spartaks)
—	MF	LAT	Oļegs Panasjuks (from FK Spartaks-2)
—	FW	LAT	Artūrs Krasnočubs (from Spartaks)

Out: Note: Flags indicate national team as defined under FIFA eligibility rules; some limited exceptions apply. Players may hold more than one non-FIFA nationality.

No.	Pos.	Nation	Player
—	MF	LAT	Romāns Geiko (to Jūrmala)
