= List of Latvian football transfers winter 2014–15 =

This is a list of Latvian football transfers in the 2014–15 winter transfer window by club. Only transfers of the Virslīga are included.

All transfers mentioned are shown in the references at the bottom of the page. If you wish to insert a transfer that isn't mentioned there, please add a reference.

== Latvian Higher League ==
=== Ventspils ===
In: Note: Flags indicate national team as defined under FIFA eligibility rules; some limited exceptions apply. Players may hold more than one non-FIFA nationality.

No.	Pos.	Nation	Player
—	GK	LAT	Vitālijs Meļņičenko (from Spartaks)
—	DF	LAT	Ritus Krjauklis (from Spartaks)
—	DF	LAT	Antons Jemeļins (from (Lithuania) Atlantas)
—	MF	LAT	Ritvars Rugins (from Skonto)
—	MF	LAT	Visvaldis Ignatāns (loan return from Daugava Daugavpils)
—	MF	SRB	Ivan Dorić (from (Bulgaria) Botev Plovdiv)
—	FW	LAT	Kaspars Svārups (loan return from (Poland) Nadwiślan Góra)
—	FW	LAT	Daniils Turkovs (from (Poland) GKS Bełchatów)

Out: Note: Flags indicate national team as defined under FIFA eligibility rules; some limited exceptions apply. Players may hold more than one non-FIFA nationality.

No.	Pos.	Nation	Player
2	DF	LAT	Kaspars Dubra (to (Belarus) BATE Borisov)
7	MF	GEO	Tornike Tarkhnishvili (to (Georgia (country)) Spartaki Tskhinvali)
19	DF	LAT	Renārs Rode (to Skonto)
20	MF	LAT	Daniils Ulimbaševs (to Spartaks)
21	MF	LAT	Edgars Vērdiņš (to BFC Daugavpils, previously on loan at Daugava Daugavpils)
22	FW	NGR	Ahmed Abdultaofik (to Spartaks)
27	DF	LTU	Robertas Freidgeimas (to (Lithuania) Utenis Utena)
30	GK	LAT	Maksims Uvarenko (to (Bulgaria) CSKA Sofia)
32	DF	LAT	Oļegs Timofejevs (to Skonto)

=== Skonto ===
In: Note: Flags indicate national team as defined under FIFA eligibility rules; some limited exceptions apply. Players may hold more than one non-FIFA nationality.

No.	Pos.	Nation	Player
—	GK	LAT	Germans Māliņš (from (Belarus) BATE Borisov)
—	DF	LAT	Vitālijs Smirnovs (from Spartaks)
—	DF	LAT	Renārs Rode (from Ventspils)
—	DF	RUS	Maxim Usanov (from (Armenia) Banants Yerevan)
—	DF	LAT	Oļegs Timofejevs (from Ventspils)
—	DF	UKR	Levan Makharadze (from (Ukraine) Illichivets Mariupol)
—	MF	LAT	Aleksejs Višņakovs (from (Moldova) Zimbru Chișinău)
—	MF	LTU	Mindaugas Kalonas (from (Israel) Hapoel Haifa)
—	MF	LAT	Igors Kozlovs (from Spartaks)
—	MF	LAT	Artūrs Pallo (from METTA/LU)
—	MF	COL	Ivan Mena (from (Colombia) Envigado)
—	MF	COL	Santiago Jimenez (from (Colombia) Habilidosos)
—	MF	LAT	Alekss Regža (from Daugava Rīga)
—	FW	LAT	Mārtiņš Milašēvičs (from METTA/LU)
—	FW	COL	Yarleison Palacios (from (Colombia) Habilidosos)
—	FW	NGR	Ayodele Dare (from (Nigeria) Dolphins Port Harcourt)
—	FW	LAT	Jurijs Krivošeja (from Spartaks)

Out: Note: Flags indicate national team as defined under FIFA eligibility rules; some limited exceptions apply. Players may hold more than one non-FIFA nationality.

No.	Pos.	Nation	Player
1	GK	LAT	Dmitrijs Grigorjevs (to Spartaks)
2	DF	LAT	Vladislavs Gabovs (to (Russia) Sokol Saratov)
8	MF	LAT	Ritvars Rugins (to Ventspils)
13	MF	GEO	Irakli Klimiashvili (to (Georgia (country)) Torpedo Kutaisi)
27	DF	GEO	Lasha Dvali (loan return to (England) Reading)

=== Jelgava ===
In: Note: Flags indicate national team as defined under FIFA eligibility rules; some limited exceptions apply. Players may hold more than one non-FIFA nationality.

No.	Pos.	Nation	Player
—	DF	SEN	Abdoulaye Diallo (from (Senegal) Casa Sports)
—	DF	LAT	Elvis Studāns (from Jūrmala)
—	MF	RUS	Rustam Sosranov (from (Belarus) Minsk)
—	MF	LAT	Gļebs Kļuškins (from Daugava Rīga)
—	FW	NGR	Ismail Musa (from (Nigeria) Enyimba International)
—	FW	LAT	Edgars Kārkliņš (from Daugava Rīga)
—	FW	GHA	Iddrisu Abdallah (from (Finland) OPS)

Out: Note: Flags indicate national team as defined under FIFA eligibility rules; some limited exceptions apply. Players may hold more than one non-FIFA nationality.

No.	Pos.	Nation	Player
10	MF	LAT	Romāns Bespalovs (to Spartaks)
11	MF	LAT	Dmitrijs Medeckis (to (Tajikistan) Khayr Vahdat)
21	FW	LAT	Vladislavs Kozlovs (to (Estonia) Infonet Tallinn)
29	FW	LAT	Maksims Daņilovs (to METTA/LU)
87	MF	LAT	Andrejs Kiriļins (to (Slovakia) ViOn Zlaté Moravce)
90	MF	LAT	Armands Pētersons (to METTA/LU)

=== Liepāja ===
In: Note: Flags indicate national team as defined under FIFA eligibility rules; some limited exceptions apply. Players may hold more than one non-FIFA nationality.

No.	Pos.	Nation	Player
—	MF	ARG	Leonel Strumia (from (Argentina) Alumni de Villa María)
—	FW	BOL	Alexis Carrasco (from (Bolivia) Club Blooming)

Out: Note: Flags indicate national team as defined under FIFA eligibility rules; some limited exceptions apply. Players may hold more than one non-FIFA nationality.

No.	Pos.	Nation	Player
3	DF	LAT	Toms Mežs (to Spartaks)
7	MF	LAT	Jānis Ikaunieks (to (France) Metz)
10	MF	LAT	Mareks Zuntners (retired)
26	DF	LAT	Deniss Ivanovs (to (Hungary) Nyíregyháza Spartacus)
30	DF	LAT	Jorens Gorkšs (to Auda)

=== Daugava Daugavpils (Debarred from participation) ===
In: Note: Flags indicate national team as defined under FIFA eligibility rules; some limited exceptions apply. Players may hold more than one non-FIFA nationality.

No.	Pos.	Nation	Player

Out: Note: Flags indicate national team as defined under FIFA eligibility rules; some limited exceptions apply. Players may hold more than one non-FIFA nationality.

No.	Pos.	Nation	Player
1	GK	LAT	Aleksandrs Vlasovs (released)
2	MF	LAT	Jans Radevičs (to BFC Daugavpils)
3	DF	UKR	Rizvan Ablitarov (to (Ukraine) Obolon-Brovar Kyiv)
4	DF	GEO	Giorgi Chikhradze (to (Georgia (country)) Zestafoni)
7	MF	UKR	Valeriy Kutsenko (to (Azerbaijan) AZAL)
8	DF	LAT	Aleksandrs Solovjovs (to Gulbene)
10	MF	LAT	Visvaldis Ignatāns (loan return to Ventspils)
11	MF	LAT	Edgars Vērdiņš (loan return to Ventspils)
13	DF	GEO	Bidzina Tsintsadze (to (Georgia (country)) Guria Lanchkhuti)
15	MF	LAT	Vladimirs Volkovs (to Gulbene)
16	FW	LAT	Ēriks Kokins (to BFC Daugavpils)
17	DF	LAT	Kirils Ševeļovs (to METTA/LU)
20	FW	RUS	Dmitri Kozlov (to (Russia) MITOS Novocherkassk)
22	MF	RUS	Andrei Arlashin (to (Russia) Spartak Kostroma)
23	MF	LAT	Jevgēņijs Kosmačovs (released)
24	DF	LAT	Pāvels Ostrovskis (to BFC Daugavpils)
26	MF	LAT	Jurijs Morozs (to Jēkabpils/JSC)
82	GK	LAT	Jevgēņijs Ņerugals (to BFC Daugavpils)

=== Spartaks ===
In: Note: Flags indicate national team as defined under FIFA eligibility rules; some limited exceptions apply. Players may hold more than one non-FIFA nationality.

No.	Pos.	Nation	Player
—	GK	LAT	Dmitrijs Grigorjevs (from Skonto)
—	DF	LAT	Nauris Bulvītis (from (Switzerland) Aarau)
—	DF	UKR	Dmytro Nazarenko (from (Ukraine) Stal Alchevsk)
—	DF	LAT	Toms Mežs (from Liepāja)
—	MF	ITA	Francesco Vivacqua (from (Italy) Taranto 1927)
—	MF	LAT	Daniils Ulimbaševs (from Ventspils)
—	MF	LAT	Romāns Bespalovs (from Jelgava)
—	MF	UKR	Maksym Maksymenko (from (Ukraine) Stal Alchevsk)
—	MF	LAT	Raivis Vītolnieks (from Daugava Rīga)
—	FW	KAZ	Sergey Gridin (from (Kazakhstan) Ordabasy)
—	FW	UKR	Serhiy Silyuk (from (Azerbaijan) Araz-Naxçıvan)
—	FW	NGR	Ahmed Abdultaofik (from Ventspils)

Out: Note: Flags indicate national team as defined under FIFA eligibility rules; some limited exceptions apply. Players may hold more than one non-FIFA nationality.

No.	Pos.	Nation	Player
1	GK	LAT	Vitālijs Meļņičenko (to Ventspils)
2	DF	LAT	Davids Bagdasarjans (to METTA/LU)
4	DF	LAT	Vitālijs Smirnovs (to Skonto)
5	DF	LAT	Dmitrijs Daņilovs (to Caramba/Dinamo)
7	MF	FIN	Moshtagh Yaghoubi (to (Finland) RoPS)
11	DF	BIH	Adi Mehremić (to (Czech Republic) Frýdek-Místek)
13	MF	LAT	Igors Kozlovs (to Skonto)
20	DF	UKR	Vitaliy Fedoriv (to (Ukraine) Hoverla Uzhhorod)
21	MF	GHA	George Arhin (released)
22	GK	LAT	Niks Rubezis (to Caramba/Dinamo)
23	FW	LAT	Jurijs Krivošeja (to Skonto)
77	FW	GHA	Patrick Twumasi (to (Kazakhstan) Astana, previously on loan)
86	DF	LAT	Ritus Krjauklis (to Ventspils)

=== Daugava Rīga (Debarred from participation) ===
In: Note: Flags indicate national team as defined under FIFA eligibility rules; some limited exceptions apply. Players may hold more than one non-FIFA nationality.

No.	Pos.	Nation	Player

Out: Note: Flags indicate national team as defined under FIFA eligibility rules; some limited exceptions apply. Players may hold more than one non-FIFA nationality.

No.	Pos.	Nation	Player
1	GK	LAT	Roberts Ozols (to Caramba/Dinamo)
2	MF	LAT	Alekss Regža (to Skonto)
5	DF	LAT	Dāvids Čudars (to Alberts)
9	FW	LAT	Kristaps Blanks (to Tukums 2000)
10	FW	LAT	Ruslans Keirāns (to Gulbene)
13	FW	LAT	Vitālijs Ziļs (to (Estonia) Narva Trans)
17	MF	LAT	Raivis Vītolnieks (to Spartaks)
18	MF	LAT	Artjoms Šatskihs (to Rīgas Futbola skola)
19	MF	LAT	Gļebs Kļuškins (to Jelgava)
20	MF	LAT	Aleksejs Koļesņikovs (to (Germany) Blau-Weiß Papenburg)
21	DF	LAT	Edijs Joksts (to METTA/LU)
22	FW	LAT	Edgars Kārkliņš (to Jelgava, previously on loan at Jūrmala)
67	GK	LAT	Jānis Krūmiņš (to (Cyprus) Akritas Chlorakas)
97	DF	LAT	Vitālijs Topčijevs (to Rīgas Futbola skola)

=== BFC Daugavpils ===
In: Note: Flags indicate national team as defined under FIFA eligibility rules; some limited exceptions apply. Players may hold more than one non-FIFA nationality.

No.	Pos.	Nation	Player
—	GK	LAT	Jevgēņijs Ņerugals (from Daugava Daugavpils)
—	DF	LAT	Pāvels Ostrovskis (from Daugava Daugavpils)
—	MF	POR	Miguel Cid (on loan from (Portugal) Boavista)
—	MF	SEN	Yoro Lamine Ly (from (Portugal) Boavista)
—	MF	FRA	Yann Goueguel (from 1625 Liepāja)
—	MF	JPN	Tomoki Fujikawa (from (Poland) Olimpia Elbląg)
—	MF	LAT	Jans Radevičs (from Daugava Daugavpils)
—	MF	LAT	Edgars Vērdiņš (from Ventspils)
—	FW	LAT	Ēriks Kokins (from Daugava Daugavpils)

Out: Note: Flags indicate national team as defined under FIFA eligibility rules; some limited exceptions apply. Players may hold more than one non-FIFA nationality.

No.	Pos.	Nation	Player
9	MF	BRA	Luiz Fernando Doretto (to (Malta) Mdina Knights)
10	MF	LAT	Jurijs Halimons (released)
12	DF	CMR	William Pegou (released)
14	DF	JPN	Kiyoshi Nakatani (released)
15	MF	LAT	Pāvels Truņins (to Rīgas Futbola skola)
19	FW	LAT	Deniss Komarovs (released)

=== METTA/LU ===
In: Note: Flags indicate national team as defined under FIFA eligibility rules; some limited exceptions apply. Players may hold more than one non-FIFA nationality.

No.	Pos.	Nation	Player
—	DF	LAT	Kirils Ševeļovs (from Daugava Daugavpils)
—	DF	LAT	Edijs Joksts (from Daugava Rīga)
—	DF	LAT	Aleksejs Giļņičs (from (Sweden) AFC United)
—	DF	LAT	Davids Bagdasarjans (from Spartaks)
—	MF	LAT	Armands Pētersons (from Jelgava)
—	MF	LAT	Andrejs Siņicins (from (Estonia) Narva Trans)
—	FW	LAT	Maksims Daņilovs (from Jelgava)

Out: Note: Flags indicate national team as defined under FIFA eligibility rules; some limited exceptions apply. Players may hold more than one non-FIFA nationality.

No.	Pos.	Nation	Player
1	GK	LAT	Artūrs Biezais (released)
3	DF	LAT	Raivis Hščanovičs (released)
9	FW	LAT	Jurģis Kalns (to Auda)
10	MF	LAT	Deniss Tarasovs (to AFA Olaine)
17	MF	LAT	Artūrs Pallo (to Skonto)
23	MF	LAT	Ņikita Parfjonovs (released)
26	FW	LAT	Mārtiņš Milašēvičs (to Skonto)
28	DF	LAT	Kārlis Putāns (released)
77	MF	LAT	Marsels Vapne (retired)

=== Gulbene ===
In: Note: Flags indicate national team as defined under FIFA eligibility rules; some limited exceptions apply. Players may hold more than one non-FIFA nationality.

No.	Pos.	Nation	Player
—	GK	ROU	Laurentiu Marin (from (Romania) Farul Constanța)
—	GK	LAT	Vladislavs Lazarevs (on loan from SFK United)
—	DF	LAT	Aleksandrs Solovjovs (from Daugava Daugavpils)
—	DF	ROU	Alin Stoica (from (Romania) Târgu Mureș)
—	DF	LAT	Konstantīns Budilovs (from (Norway) Spjelkavik IL)
—	DF	LAT	Aleksandrs Ivanovs (from Daugava Daugavpils)
—	DF	LAT	Gatis Štrauss (from SFK United)
—	DF	LAT	Oto Šeļegovičs (from SFK United)
—	MF	LAT	Vladimirs Volkovs (from Daugava Daugavpils)
—	MF	LAT	Ņikita Pačko (on loan from SFK United)
—	MF	LAT	Ernests Pilats (free agent)
—	FW	FIN	Iidle Elmi (from (Finland) FF Jaro)
—	FW	EGY	Tarek Amer (from (Romania) Farul Constanța)
—	FW	LAT	Ruslans Keirāns (from Daugava Rīga)
—	FW	RUS	Ivan Latyshev (free agent)

Out: Note: Flags indicate national team as defined under FIFA eligibility rules; some limited exceptions apply. Players may hold more than one non-FIFA nationality.

No.	Pos.	Nation	Player
4	DF	LAT	Jevgēņijs Kazura (to AFA Olaine)
5	DF	LAT	Igors Barinovs (to Rīgas Futbola skola)
8	FW	LAT	Aleksejs Bespalovs (to Caramba/Dinamo)
9	MF	LAT	Raitis Dzelzkalējs (to Caramba/Dinamo)
11	FW	LAT	Verners Apiņš (to Caramba/Dinamo)
12	GK	LAT	Maksims Vitkovskis (released)
14	MF	LAT	Jurijs Idionovs (to Caramba/Dinamo)
15	FW	LAT	Romāns Tepo (released)
18	DF	LAT	Viktors Golovzins (to Caramba/Dinamo)
19	DF	LAT	Māris Savinovs (to Caramba/Dinamo)
20	DF	LAT	Mārcis Savinovs (to Caramba/Dinamo)
21	DF	LAT	Pāvels Skalenko (released)
22	MF	LAT	Vladislavs Ždaņko (to AFA Olaine)
