= 2012–13 Moldovan National Division =

Moldovan National Division
- Season: 2012–13
- Champions: Sheriff Tiraspol
- Relegated: Iskra-Stal Rîbnița; Nistru Otaci
- Champions League: Sheriff Tiraspol
- Europa League: FC Dacia Chișinău; FC Tiraspol; Milsami Orhei
- Matches: 191
- Goals: 500 (2.62 per match)
- Top goalscorer: Gheorghe Boghiu (16 goals)
- Biggest home win: Academia 6–0 Nistru
- Biggest away win: FC Speranţa Crihana Veche 9–8 Zimbru Chişinău
- Highest scoring: FC Speranţa Crihana Veche 9–8 Zimbru Chişinău
- Highest attendance: 6,000; Zimbru 0–2 Sheriff (16 May 2013)

The 2012–13 Moldovan National Division (Romanian: Divizia Națională) is the 22nd season of top-tier football in Moldova. The competition began on 13 July 2012 and ended in May 2013.

The league comprises 12 teams, 11 from the 2011–12 season and one promoted site from 2011–12 A Division. Sheriff Tiraspol are the defending champions.

== Teams ==
CSCA–Rapid Chişinău and FC Costuleni were originally relegated on competitive grounds at the end of the 2011–12 season as they finished in the bottom two places of the league table. However, both clubs were eventually spared after Sfintul Gheorghe Suruceni did not obtain a National Division licence for 2012–13 and only one team, runners-up Speranţa Crihana Veche, could be promoted from the top four 2011–12 A Division sides on the same grounds.

In further changes, FC Academia UTM Chişinău were renamed FC Academia Chişinău.

=== Stadia and locations ===
Location of teams in National Division 2011–12

=== Personnel and sponsorship ===
Team	Home city	Head coach	Captain	Kit manufacturer	Shirt sponsor
Academia	Chișinău	(Ukraine) Volodymyr Knysh	(Moldova) Radu Gînsari	Macron	-
Costuleni	Costuleni	(Moldova) Marcel Reşitca	(Moldova) Andrei Solodchi	Joma	Cavio
Rapid	Ghidighici	(Moldova) Sergiu Secu	(Moldova) Andrei Bugneac	Legea	-
Dacia	Chișinău	(Russia) Igor Dobrovolski	(Moldova) Eugen Matiughin	Puma	-
Iskra-Stal	Rîbnița	(Moldova) Iurie Blonari	(Moldova) Andrei Porfireanu	Puma	AOMMZ
Milsami	Orhei	(Romania) Ştefan Stoica	(Moldova) Valentin Furdui	Joma	Dufremol
Nistru	Otaci	(Ukraine) Oleksandr Holokolosov	(Cameroon) Alphonse Sopho	Legea	-
Olimpia	Bălţi	(Israel) Albert Solomonov	(Moldova) Nicolae Orlovschi	Acerbis	Simtravel
Sheriff	Tiraspol	(Romania) Mihai Stoichiță	(Slovenia) Miral Samardžić	Adidas	IDC
Speranţa	Crihana Veche	(Moldova) Igor Ursachi	(Moldova) Ghenadie Ochincă	Jako	-
Tiraspol	Tiraspol	(Moldova) Vlad Goian	(Moldova) Vitalie Bulat	Adidas	Tirotex
Zimbru	Chișinău	(Moldova) Oleg Fistican	(Moldova) Oleg Şişchin	Puma	CFM

Promoted sides Speranţa Crihana Veche play their home matches in the nearby town of Cahul.

Club	Location	Stadium	Capacity
Academia Chişinău	Chișinău	Dinamo Stadium	2,888
FC Costuleni	Costuleni	CSR Orhei	2,539
CSCA–Rapid Chişinău	Ghidighici	Ghidighici Stadium	1,500
Dacia Chişinău	Chişinău	Zimbru Stadium	10,600
Iskra-Stal Rîbnița	Rîbnița	Stadionul CPSM, Vadul lui Vodă	1,000
Milsami Orhei	Orhei	CSR Orhei	2,539
Nistru Otaci	Otaci	Călărăşăuca Stadium	2,000
Olimpia Bălţi	Bălţi	Olimpia Bălţi Stadium	5,953
Speranţa Crihana Veche	Crihana Veche	Stadionul CPSM	1,000
Sheriff Tiraspol	Tiraspol	Sheriff Stadium	13,460
FC Tiraspol	Tiraspol	Sheriff Stadium	13,460
Zimbru Chişinău	Chişinău	Zimbru Stadium	10,600

== League table ==
Pos	Team	Pld	W	D	L	GF	GA	GD	Pts	Qualification or relegation
1	Sheriff Tiraspol (C)	33	25	5	3	65	17	+48	80	Qualification for the Champions League second qualifying round
2	Dacia Chişinău	33	18	12	3	47	19	+28	66	Qualification for the Europa League first qualifying round (Note: Since Tiraspol won the 2012–13 Moldovan Cup, 4th-placed team, Milsami Orhei, also qualified for UEFA Europa League.)
3	FC Tiraspol	33	18	10	5	54	20	+34	64	Qualification for the Europa League first qualifying round
4	Milsami Orhei	33	18	4	11	48	30	+18	58	Qualification for the Europa League first qualifying round
5	Rapid Ghidighici	33	15	4	14	36	38	−2	49	
6	Zimbru Chişinău	33	12	10	11	53	38	+15	46	
7	Academia Chişinău	33	12	8	13	55	52	+3	44	
8	Costuleni	33	9	11	13	38	48	−10	38	
9	Iskra-Stal Rîbnița (D, R)	33	10	8	15	37	55	−18	38	Relegation to Division "B" (Note: Iskra-Stal was withdrawn on 7 May 2013 for not being present at 2 matches . According to decision of the FMF Competitions Committee in all remaining matches team will be given technical defeat (0-3).)
10	Olimpia Bălţi	33	10	5	18	31	50	−19	35	
11	Speranţa Crihana Veche	33	4	7	22	35	70	−35	19	
12	Nistru Otaci (R)	33	2	6	25	21	83	−62	12	Relegation to Division "A"

Source: Football Association of Moldova
Rules for classification: 1st points; 2nd head-to-head points; 3rd head-to-head goal difference; 4th head-to-head goals scored; 5th goal difference; 6th number of goals scored; 7th Fair Play competition
(C) Champions; (D) Disqualified; (R) Relegated

=== Positions by round ===
The following table represents the teams position after each round in the competition.

Leader
2nd place
3rd place
Relegation

Team ╲ Round	1	2	3	4	5	6	7	8	9	10	11	12	13	14	15	16	17	18	19	20	21	22	23	24	25	26	27	28	29	30	31	32	33
Sheriff Tiraspol	1	1	1	1	1	1	1	1	1	1	1	1	1	1	1	1	1	1	1	1	1	1	1	1	1	1	1	1	1	1	1	1	1
Dacia Chișinău	5	4	3	2	2	2	2	2	2	2	2	2	2	2	2	2	2	2	2	2	2	2	2	2	2	2	2	2	2	2	2	2	2
Tiraspol	4	5	6	6	3	4	3	3	3	5	4	5	6	4	3	3	3	3	3	3	3	3	3	3	3	3	3	3	3	3	3	3	3
Milsami Orhei	3	2	4	4	4	3	4	4	7	4	3	6	8	5	6	5	4	5	5	4	4	4	4	4	4	4	4	4	4	4	4	4	4
Rapid Ghidighici	10	6	7	5	7	6	6	7	6	6	5	7	3	7	8	8	9	8	6	8	6	5	5	6	5	5	5	5	5	5	6	5	5
Zimbru Chișinău	8	8	8	8	10	7	7	5	4	3	6	3	4	8	4	7	7	7	8	6	7	9	9	8	8	8	8	7	6	6	7	6	6
Academia Chișinău	9	11	12	12	9	10	8	8	5	7	7	4	5	3	5	4	5	4	4	5	5	6	7	7	7	7	6	6	7	7	5	7	7
Costuleni	12	10	9	11	8	9	10	10	10	10	10	10	11	10	10	10	10	10	10	10	10	10	10	10	10	10	10	10	10	10	9	9	8
Iskra - Stal Rîbnița	6	7	5	7	6	8	9	9	9	9	8	9	9	9	9	9	8	9	9	7	8	7	6	5	6	6	7	8	8	8	8	8	9
Olimpia Bălți	2	3	2	3	5	5	5	6	8	8	9	8	7	6	7	6	6	6	7	9	9	8	8	9	9	9	9	9	9	9	10	10	10
Speranța Crihana Veche	7	9	10	9	11	12	11	11	12	11	11	11	12	12	12	12	12	12	12	11	12	12	12	12	12	11	11	11	11	11	11	11	11
Nistru Otaci	11	12	11	10	12	11	12	12	11	12	12	12	10	11	11	11	11	11	11	12	11	11	11	11	11	12	12	12	12	12	12	12	12

Updated to match(es) played on 31 May 2013. Source: kicker.de

== Results ==
The schedule consists of three rounds. During the first two rounds, each team plays each other once home and away for a total of 22 matches. The pairings of the third round will then be set according to the standings after the first two rounds, giving every team a third game against each opponent for a total of 33 games per team.

=== First and second round ===
Home \ Away	ACA	RAP	COS	DAC	ISK	MIL	NIS	OLI	SHE	SCV	TIR	ZIM
Academia Chișinău		5–0	1–1	0–4	3–2	3–1	6–0	1–2	1–4	3–5	1–0	2–2
Rapid Ghidighici	0–2		1–2	0–1	2–1	3–2	3–1	0–0	0–2	2–0	0–1	2–1
Costuleni	1–2	0–2		0–0	0–0	0–1	1–1	0–1	0–3	2–2	1–1	1–0
Dacia Chișinău	1–1	1–0	4–2		4–1	1–0	3–0	1–0	0–1	1–0	1–1	3–2
Iskra - Stal Rîbnița	1–0	0–1	2–0	2–2		3–3	5–2	1–0	2–2	4–3	0–0	2–3
Milsami Orhei	1–0	2–0	3–0	0–0	2–0		2–0	0–1	3–0	3–2	0–0	0–0
Nistru Otaci	1–2	0–1	0–2	0–2	1–1	2–1		0–3	1–7	1–1	0–0	2–0
Olimpia Bălți	1–1	1–3	0–1	0–1	2–3	0–2	2–0		0–1	2–0	2–0	0–0
Sheriff Tiraspol	3–0	0–0	5–0	0–0	1–0	1–0	2–1	3–0		3–0	2–0	1–0
Speranța Crihana Veche	1–3	0–1	0–0	1–1	0–1	0–1	0–0	0–2	0–2		0–2	1–2
Tiraspol	1–0	2–2	4–0	0–0	3–0	2–1	3–1	0–0	1–2	3–0		2–1
Zimbru Chișinău	4–0	1–0	3–3	1–1	0–1	2–1	4–0	4–3	0–1	1–1	0–1	

Source: Football Association of Moldova
Legend: Blue = home team win; Yellow = draw; Red = away team win.

=== Third round ===
Key numbers for pairing determination (number marks position after 22 games):

23rd round	24th round	25th round	26th round	27th round	28th round
1 – 12	12 – 7	2 – 12	12 – 8	3 – 12	12 – 9
2 – 11	8 – 6	3 – 1	9 – 7	4 – 2	10 – 8
3 – 10	9 – 5	4 – 11	10 – 6	5 – 1	11 – 7
4 – 9	10 – 4	5 – 10	11 – 5	6 – 11	1 – 6
5 – 8	11 – 3	6 – 9	1 – 4	7 – 10	2 – 5
6 – 7	1 – 2	7 – 8	2 – 3	8 – 9	3 – 4

29th round	30th round	31st round	32nd round	33rd round
4 – 12	12 – 10	5 – 12	12 – 11	6 – 12
5 – 3	11 – 9	6 – 4	1 – 10	7 – 5
6 – 2	1 – 8	7 – 3	2 – 9	8 – 4
7 – 1	2 – 7	8 – 2	3 – 8	9 – 3
8 – 11	3 – 6	9 – 1	4 – 7	10 – 2
9 – 10	4 – 5	10 – 11	5 – 6	11 – 1

Home \ Away	ACA	RAP	COS	DAC	ISK	MIL	NIS	OLI	SHE	SCV	TIR	ZIM
Academia Chișinău				1–2	0–2	2–1	5–1			2–2		0–1
Rapid Ghidighici	3–1		0–0					1–0	0–2	0–3	0–1	
Costuleni	2–2			2–1		1–2	2–0	4–0				
Dacia Chișinău		1–0			3–0		2–0			3–2	0–0	0–0
Iskra – Stal Rîbnița		0–3	0–3					0–1	0–3		0–3	
Milsami Orhei		1–2		1–0	3–0		4–0			2–1		2–1
Nistru Otaci		0–2			2–2				1–2		0–3	0–3
Olimpia Bălți	0–3			1–3		0–1	3–1					2–2
Sheriff Tiraspol	1–1		2–1	0–0		1–2		3–0		2–1		
Speranța Crihana Veche			1–4		0–1		4–2	3–1				1–8
Tiraspol	1–1		3–1			2–0		7–1	2–1	5–0		
Zimbru Chișinău		4–2	1–1		0–0				0–2		2–0	

Source: Football Association of Moldova
Legend: Blue = home team win; Yellow = draw; Red = away team win.

== Top goalscorers ==
Updated to matches played on 1 June 2013.

Rank	Player	Club	Goals
1	(Moldova) Gheorghe Boghiu	Milsami	16
2	(Moldova) Vadim Crîcimari	FC Speranţa Crihana Veche	14
3	(Moldova) Radu Gînsari	FC Academia Chişinău	12
3	(Moldova) Vadim Cemîrtan	FC Nistru Otaci (5) & FC Costuleni (7)	12
5	(Moldova) Anatolie Doroş	Rapid Ghidighici	10
5	(Brazil) Guilherme de Paula Lucrécio	FC Milsami	10
7	(Moldova) Alexandru Pașcenco	Sheriff Tiraspol	9
7	(Moldova) Ghenadie Orbu	FC Dacia Chişinău	9
7	(Ukraine) Volodymyr Kilikevych	FC Iskra-Stal	9
7	(Moldova) Oleg Molla	Zimbru Chișinău (8) & FC Dacia Chișinău (1)	9
7	(Moldova) Alexandru Sergiu Grosu	FC Tiraspol	9

8 goals (1 players)
- (Moldova) Alexandru Popovici (FC Tiraspol)
7 goals (4 players)
- (Moldova) Vladislav Ivanov (FC Costuleni)
- (Moldova) Maxim Antoniuc (FC Iskra-Stal)
- (Serbia) Aleksandar Pešić (FC Sheriff Tiraspol)
- (Ghana) Eric Sackey (FC Zimbru Chişinău(6) & FC Dacia Chişinău (1))
6 goals (6 players)
- (Montenegro) Miloš Krkotić (FC Dacia Chişinău)
- (Ukraine) Artem Kozlov (FC Olimpia)
- (Ukraine) Yuri Shevel (FC Olimpia)
- (Bulgaria) Georgi Karaneychev (FC Tiraspol)
- (Moldova) Radu Catan (FC Zimbru Chişinău)
- (Moldova) Alexandru Antoniuc (FC Zimbru Chişinău)
5 goals (9 players)
- (Moldova) Iurie Livandovschi (FC Academia Chişinău)
- (Brazil) Cairo de Andrade (FC Dacia Chişinău)
- (Serbia) Marko Markovski (FC Sheriff Tiraspol)
- (Burkina Faso) Wilfried Balima (FC Sheriff Tiraspol)
- (Brazil) Luvannor (FC Sheriff Tiraspol)
- (Moldova) Victor Bulat (FC Tiraspol)
- (Ukraine) Yevhen Zarichnyuk (FC Tiraspol)
- (Moldova) Andrei Bugneac (Rapid Ghidighici(1) & FC Costuleni (4))
- (Moldova) Petru Leuca (FC Iskra-Stal (3) & FC Milsami (2))
4 goals (12 players)
- (Moldova) Alexandru Suvorov (FC Academia Chişinău)
- (Moldova) Octavian Onofrei (FC Costuleni)
- (Romania) Valerian Gârlă (FC Milsami)
- (Serbia) Marko Stanojević (FC Sheriff Tiraspol)
- (Moldova) Evgheni Dovbîșenco (FC Speranţa Crihana Veche)
- (Moldova) Eugen Gorceac (FC Speranţa Crihana Veche)
- (Russia) Sergey Tsyganov (FC Zimbru Chişinău)
- (Moldova) Bogdan Hausi (Rapid Ghidighici (2) & FC Tiraspol (2))
- (Moldova) Andrei Novicov (FC Iskra-Stal(3) & FC Tiraspol (1))
- (Moldova) Alexandru Dedov (FC Sheriff Tiraspol(3) & FC Academia Chişinău (1))
- (Moldova) Oleg Andronic (FC Speranţa Crihana Veche(1) & FC Zimbru Chişinău (3))
- (Moldova) Konstantin Yavorskiy (FC Zimbru Chişinău(3) & FC Milsami (1))
3 goals (22 players)
- (Moldova) Ion Demerji (FC Academia Chişinău)
- (Moldova) Vladimir Potlog (FC Academia Chişinău)
- (Moldova) Valeriu Ciupercă (FC Academia Chişinău)
- (Moldova) Eduard Avram (FC Academia Chişinău)
- (Ukraine) Igor Prokuror (FC Academia Chişinău)
- (Moldova) Alexandru Maxim (Rapid Ghidighici)
- (Russia) Vasily Pavlov (FC Dacia Chişinău)
- (Moldova) Vitalie Zlatan (FC Iskra-Stal)
- (Moldova) Eugen Gorodeţchi (FC Iskra-Stal)
- (Moldova) Ivan Carandaşov (FC Nistru Otaci)
- (Moldova) Andrei Bejenari (FC Nistru Otaci)
- (Moldova) Veaceslav Lisa (FC Sheriff Tiraspol)
- (Moldova) Serghei Dadu (FC Sheriff Tiraspol)
- (Slovenia) Miral Samardžić (FC Sheriff Tiraspol)
- (Ivory Coast) Marcel Metoua (FC Sheriff Tiraspol)
- (Moldova) Vladimir Rassulov (FC Speranţa Crihana Veche)
- (Nigeria) Charles Newuche (FC Tiraspol)
- (Georgia (country)) Levan Korgalidze (FC Zimbru Chişinău)
- (Moldova) Victor Gonţa (FC Costuleni(2) & Rapid Ghidighici (1)))
- (Moldova) Nicolae Josan (FC Dacia Chişinău(2) & FC Tiraspol (1)))
- (Moldova) Marian Stoleru (FC Milsami(1) & FC Dacia Chişinău (2))
- (Montenegro) Janko Tumbasević (FC Zimbru Chişinău(2) & FC Dacia Chişinău (1)))
2 goals (37 players)
- (Moldova) Petru Ojog (FC Academia Chişinău)
- (Moldova) Iulian Erhan (FC Academia Chişinău)
- (Moldova) Ion League (FC Academia Chişinău)
- (Moldova) Dumitru Bogdan (FC Academia Chişinău)
- (Moldova) Alexandru Vremea (FC Academia Chişinău)
- (Moldova) Daniel Pîslă (FC Costuleni)
- (Moldova) Andrei Solodchi (FC Costuleni)
- (Moldova) Timur Vâlcu (FC Costuleni)
- (Moldova) Sergiu Mocanu (FC Costuleni)
- (Moldova) Maxim Franțuz (Rapid Ghidighici)
- (Moldova) Alexandru Leu (Rapid Ghidighici)
- (Moldova) Gheorghe Ovseannicov (Rapid Ghidighici)
- (Moldova) Igor Picus (Rapid Ghidighici)
- (Moldova) Dumitru Bacal (Rapid Ghidighici)
- (Moldova) Dumitru Popovici (FC Dacia Chişinău)
- (Moldova) Maxim Mihaliov (FC Dacia Chişinău)
- (Moldova) Denis Ilescu (FC Dacia Chişinău)
- (Moldova) Alexandru Bezimov (FC Iskra-Stal)
- (Moldova) Gheorghe Nicologlo (FC Iskra-Stal)
- (Romania) Cornel Gheţi (FC Milsami)
- (Portugal) Simão (FC Milsami)
- (Moldova) Valentin Furdui (FC Milsami)
- (Moldova) Ştefan Burghiu (FC Nistru Otaci)
- (Moldova) Denis Banari (FC Nistru Otaci)
- (Moldova) Fedor Andriuhin (FC Olimpia)
- (Moldova) Serghei Pogreban (FC Olimpia)
- (Japan) Yusaku Toyoshima (FC Olimpia)
- (Moldova) Igor Dima (FC Sheriff Tiraspol)
- (Moldova) Nicolae Triboi (FC Speranţa Crihana Veche)
- (Moldova) Andrei Marina (FC Speranţa Crihana Veche)
- (Ukraine) Maksym Maksymenko (FC Tiraspol)
- (Brazil) Fred (FC Tiraspol)
- (Moldova) Alexandru Grosu (FC Tiraspol)
- (Moldova) Gheorghe Andronic (FC Zimbru Chişinău)
- (Czech Republic) Aleš Schuster (FC Zimbru Chişinău)
- (Georgia (country)) Tornike Stepaniashvili (FC Zimbru Chişinău)
- (Moldova) Anatolii Cheptine (FC Sheriff Tiraspol(1) & FC Tiraspol (1))
1 goals (69 players)
- (Moldova) Andrian Caşcaval (FC Academia Chişinău)
- (Moldova) Igor Andronic (FC Academia Chişinău)
- (Moldova) Ştefan Caraulan (FC Academia Chişinău)
- (Moldova) Petru Stinga (FC Academia Chişinău)
- (Moldova) Alexei Solomin (FC Academia Chişinău)
- (Moldova) Artur Pătraş (FC Academia Chişinău)
- (Moldova) Victor Truhanov (FC Academia Chişinău)
- (Moldova) Maxim Focşa (FC Academia Chişinău)
- (Ivory Coast) Kouasii Kouadio (FC Costuleni)
- (Moldova) Iurii Siniţchih (FC Costuleni)
- (Nigeria) Maxwell Egwuatu (FC Costuleni)
- (Moldova) Stanislav Luca (Rapid Ghidighici)
- (Moldova) Vasile Rusu (Rapid Ghidighici)
- (Moldova) Oleg Clonin (Rapid Ghidighici)
- (Moldova) Ion Jardan (Rapid Ghidighici)
- (North Macedonia) Goran Dimovski (FC Dacia Chişinău)
- (Sweden) Osman Sow (FC Dacia Chişinău)
- (Moldova) Victor Comleonoc (FC Dacia Chişinău)
- (Moldova) Alexandru Bejan (FC Dacia Chişinău)
- (Moldova) Veaceslav Posmac (FC Dacia Chişinău)
- (Moldova) Eduard Tomaşcov (FC Iskra-Stal)
- (Moldova) Valeriu Andronic (FC Iskra-Stal)
- (Moldova) Maxim Cebotari (FC Iskra-Stal)
- (Moldova) Eugen Buză (FC Iskra-Stal)
- (Georgia (country)) Sandro Shugladze (FC Iskra-Stal)
- (Moldova) Vadim Călugher (FC Milsami)
- (Spain) Rafael Wellington (FC Milsami)
- (Ivory Coast) Ousmane Traoré (FC Milsami)
- (Moldova) Andrei Ciofu (FC Milsami)
- (Moldova) Vadim Ucraineț (FC Nistru Otaci)
- (Romania) Sorin Marin (FC Nistru Otaci)
- (Moldova) Alexandr Cucerenco (FC Nistru Otaci)
- (Moldova) Nicolai Gulac (FC Nistru Otaci)
- (Moldova) Iurie Pantia (FC Nistru Otaci)
- (Nigeria) Babatunde Ajabula (FC Olimpia)
- (Ukraine) Maksim Kuba (FC Olimpia)
- (Nigeria) Julius Adaramola (FC Olimpia)
- (Guinea) Ibrahima Kamara (FC Olimpia)
- (Moldova) Mihail Paseciniuc (FC Olimpia)
- (Japan) Shotaro Okada (FC Olimpia)
- (Moldova) Serghei Gusacov (FC Olimpia)
- (Moldova) Ion Lăcustă (FC Olimpia)
- (Moldova) Aleksandr Casianov (FC Olimpia)
- (Russia) Albert Bogatyrev (FC Olimpia)
- (Moldova) Iurie Bodean (FC Olimpia)
- (Moldova) Serghei Gheorghiev (FC Sheriff Tiraspol)
- (Moldova) Yuri Myrza (FC Sheriff Tiraspol)
- (Slovenia) Tadej Apatič (FC Sheriff Tiraspol)
- (Russia) Nail Zamaliyev (FC Sheriff Tiraspol)
- (Moldova) Stanislav Ivanov (FC Sheriff Tiraspol)
- (Burkina Faso) Florent Rouamba (FC Sheriff Tiraspol)
- (Romania) Ciprian Tănasă (FC Sheriff Tiraspol)
- (Moldova) Vadim Rață (FC Sheriff Tiraspol)
- (Moldova) Dan Vasilov (FC Speranţa Crihana Veche)
- (Moldova) Alexandru Namaşco (FC Speranţa Crihana Veche)
- (Moldova) Veaceslav Sofroni (FC Speranţa Crihana Veche)
- (Moldova) Ghenadie Ochincă (FC Speranţa Crihana Veche)
- (Tajikistan) Firuz Bobiev (FC Speranţa Crihana Veche)
- (Ukraine) Serhiy Shapoval (FC Tiraspol)
- (Ukraine) Fyodor Yemelyanov (FC Tiraspol)
- (Moldova) Igor Costrov (FC Tiraspol)
- (Guinea) Djibril Paye (FC Tiraspol)
- (Russia) Anvar Ibragimgadzhiev (FC Zimbru Chişinău)
- (Moldova) Dan Spătăru (FC Zimbru Chişinău)
- (Russia) Akhmet Barakhoyev (FC Zimbru Chişinău)
- (Brazil) Samuel Miranda (FC Zimbru Chişinău)
- (Moldova) Oleg Şişchin (FC Zimbru Chişinău)
- (Georgia (country)) Konstantine Gabashvili (FC Zimbru Chişinău)
- (Moldova) Eugen Slivca (FC Zimbru Chişinău)

=== Hat-tricks ===
Key
^{4}	Player scored four goals
^{5}	Player scored five goals

Player	Home	Away	Result	Date
(Moldova) Radu Gînsari^{4}	FC Academia Chişinău	Rapid Ghidighici	5–0	11 November 2012
(Moldova) Vitalie Zlatan	FC Iskra-Stal Rîbnița	FC Speranța Crihana Veche	4–3	9 March 2013
(Bulgaria) Georgi Karaneychev	FC Tiraspol	FC Speranța Crihana Veche	5–0	21 April 2013
(Russia) Sergey Tsyganov	FC Speranța Crihana Veche	FC Zimbru Chişinău	1–8	26 April 2013

=== Clean sheets ===
As of 1 June 2013

Rank	Player	Club	Clean sheets
1	(Bulgaria) Georgi Georgiev	FC Tiraspol	17
2	(Moldova) Andrian Negai	FC Milsami	15
3	(Moldova) Eugen Matiughin	FC Dacia Chișinău	10
3	(Moldova) Artiom Gaiduchevici	FC Dacia Chișinău	10
3	(Moldova) Nicolae Calancea	FC Zimbru Chișinău	10
6	(Moldova) Alexandru Zveaghințev	FC Sheriff Tiraspol	9
7	(Bulgaria) Vladislav Stoyanov	FC Sheriff Tiraspol	8
8	(Moldova) Denis Cristofovici	FC Olimpia	7
9	(Moldova) Serghei Juric	FC Iskra-Stal	6
9	(Moldova) Vladimir Livşiţ	CSCA–Rapid Chișinău	6
9	(Moldova) Gheorghe Tonu	FC Costuleni	6

== Disciplinary ==
Final classification.

Rank	Player	Club	Yellow Cards	Red Cards	Points
1	(Moldova) Dumitru Bogdan	FC Academia Chișinău	12	1	15
2	(Moldova) Alexandru Vremea	FC Academia Chișinău	8	2	14
2	(Romania) Valerian Gârlă	FC Milsami	8	2	14
