= 2012–13 FC Dacia season =

FC Dacia Chişinău
2012–13 season
- Manager: Igor Dobrovolski
- Moldovan National Division: 2nd
- Moldovan Cup: Quarter-final
- UEFA Europa League: Second qualifying round

2012–13 season is the 11th Moldovan National Division season in the history of FC Dacia Chișinău.

== Competitive games ==
Win Draw Loss

=== Friendlies ===
==== Pre-season / First Half Season ====
16 June 2012	Zimbru (Moldova)	0–1	(Moldova) Dacia	Chișinău, Moldova
10:00 EEST		Report (in Romanian)	Andrade	Stadium: Zimbru Stadium

20 June 2012	Dacia (Moldova)	3–0	(Moldova) Milsami-Ursidos	Chișinău, Moldova
18:30 EEST	Andrade 16'; Célio 18'; Orbu 89'	Report (in Romanian)		Stadium: Zimbru Stadium; Attendance: 100

== Transfers and loans ==
=== Pre-season window ===
Transfers in
Date	Pos.	No.	Player	From club	Transfer fee
14 Jun 2011	FW	-	(North Macedonia) Ersen Sali	(North Macedonia) FK Shkëndija	Free

Transfers out
Date	Pos.	No.	Player	To club	Transfer fee
