= Pāvels Mihadjuks =

Latvian footballer

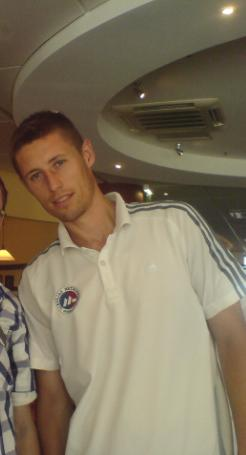
- Mihadjuks with Liepājas Metalurgs in 2012

Personal information
- Full name: Pāvels Mihadjuks
- Date of birth: 27 May 1980 (age 46)
- Place of birth: Liepāja, Latvian SSR, USSR
- Position: Centre back

Youth career
- FHK Liepājas Metalurgs

Senior career*
| Years | Team | Apps | (Gls) |
| 1999–2001 | Liepājas Metalurgs | 4 | (0) |
| 2002–2003 | RKB Arma-Rīga | 10 | (0) |
| 2004 | Ditton Daugavpils | 24 | (0) |
| 2005–2008 | FK Rīga | 92 | (6) |
| 2008 | FK Ventspils | 3 | (0) |
| 2009 | Inverness Caledonian Thistle | 12 | (1) |
| 2009–2010 | FK Ventspils | 13 | (0) |
| 2010 | → Dundee United (loan) | 3 | (0) |
| 2010–2012 | Liepājas Metalurgs | 46 | (4) |
| 2013 | Daugava Rīga | 21 | (1) |
| 2014 | FC Jūrmala | 8 | (0) |
| 2014–2016 | FK Liepāja | 37 | (3) |
| 2016–2019 | Spartaks Jūrmala | 51 | (1) |
| 2019 | FK Tukums 2000 | | |

International career
| 1998 | Latvia U-18 | 2 | (0) |
| 2000–2001 | Latvia U-21 | 6 | (0) |
| 2009–2013 | Latvia | 16 | (1) |
- * Club domestic league appearances and goals

Pāvels Mihadjuks (born 27 May 1980) is a Latvian retired professional footballer.

== Club career ==
=== Early career ===
As a youth player Mihadjuks played for his local club Liepājas Metalurgs, passing his first training at the age of 7. He started his career as a forward, but quickly developed into an imposing centre half. He was taken to the first team at the age of 18 and in the 1999 season, which was his debut season with the club, Metalurgs finished as the runner-up of the Latvian Higher League. During three seasons with the club Mihadjuks appeared only in 3 league matches, proving to be unable to compete with the more experienced players at the club. At the start of 2002 Mihadjuks moved to RKB Arma-Rīga and in his debut season with the club he helped it win the Latvian First League and earn a promotion to the top tier championship. In 2003 Arma-Rīga finished the season in the 8th position of the table and this was the first significant experience for Mihadjuks in the Lartvian Higher League. Due to financial issues the club was dissolved at the end of the season and in 2004 Mihadjuks joined Ditton Daugavpils. There he became a first eleven player, playing 24 league matches throughout the season. Ditton finished 7th in the league while Mihadjuks individual performance attracted attention from bigger Latvian clubs.

=== FK Rīga and FK Ventspils ===
Mihadjuks local breakthrough came in 2005, when he joined FK Rīga. Over the next four seasons with the club he played 92 league matches, scoring 6 goals. In 2007 they finished 3rd in the league and earned a spot in the UEFA Intertoto Cup qualification. In 2008 Mihadjuks made his debut in the tournament as FK Rīga managed to beat the Icelandic club Fylkir in the first round and the Irish side Bohemian in the second round of the tournament. In the 3rd round they lost on aggregate to the Swedish club Elfsborg. During the season FK Rīga were struck by major financial difficulties which led to dissolving of the club after the 2008 season. Being in vast debts with players, coaches, team personnel and other parties, the club broke off contracts with its top players already during the season and in mid-summer 2008 Mihadjuks became a free agent. In July 2008 he joined that time Latvian champions and cup winners FK Ventspils. With Mihadjuks' appearance at the club they managed to win the league for the second year in a row in 2008. In addition, Ventspils managed to beat the Norwegian champions SK Brann 2–1 in the second round of the UEFA Champions League qualifiers.

=== Scottish Premier League ===
In January 2009 Mihadjuks went on trial with the Scottish Premier League club Inverness Caledonian Thistle. He joined the club's trainings and signed a contract with them until the end of the 2008–09 season a few days later. Mihadjuks made his Inverness debut in the Scottish Cup match against Partick Thistle. He scored his first goal for the club in a league match against Hearts. After the end of the 2008–09 season he left Scotland and returned to his former club FK Ventspils for a short period of time. On 8 February 2010 it was announced that Dundee United had completed the signing of Mihadjuks on loan from Ventspils until the end of the season. He made his debut for Dundee United on 10 February 2010 in a league match against Hamilton Academical. Mihadjuks helped Dundee United win the 2009–10 Scottish Cup. Having appeared in 3 league matches during the loan spell, Mihadjuks returned to Latvia after the season.

=== Return to Latvia ===
Following long-term talks in July 2010 Mihadjuks reached an agreement with that time Latvian champions Liepājas Metalurgs and signed a contract with them for 1,5 years. That season they participated in the UEFA Champions League, losing to the Czech club Sparta Prague on aggregate. In 2011 Mihadjuks helped Metalurgs finish the league as runners-up and they also ended their cup campaign as runners-up losing to FK Ventspils in the final. After the end of the 2011 season Mihadjuks extended his contract for another year and played in the UEFA Europa League. In a period of three years with Liepājas Metalurgs Mihadjuks played 46 league matches, scoring 4 goals. Before the start of the 2013 season he moved to Daugava Rīga. He played 21 league matches for Daugava and scored 1 goal, helping them achieve the best success in the club's history as they managed to finish the season in the top four and qualify for the UEFA Europa League. At the start of 2014 Mihadjuks moved to FC Jūrmala on a one-year deal and, furthermore, was elected as the club's captain for the following season. Soon after the start of the season the club experienced major financial difficulties and its results subsequently worsened. Being in debts with its players, the club let go of its leaders and in July 2014 Mihadjuks joined the newly formed FK Liepāja. He helped the club finish the season in the top four. In 2015 Mihadjuks became champion of Latvia with FK Liepāja, but in the next two seasons he managed to repeat the success with Spartaks Jūrmala, club to which Mihadjuks moved in June 2016.

=== FK Tukums 2000 ===
In 2019, Mihadjuks joined FK Tukums 2000 at the age of 38, where he now works as a youth coach.

== International career ==
Mihadjuks was a member of Latvia U-18 and Latvia U-21 football teams. He made his debut for Latvia national football team on 12 August 2009 in a friendly match against Bulgaria. Mihadjuks scored his first international goal for Latvia on 7 June 2011 in a friendly match against Austria. Mihadjuks played his last international match up to date on 7 June 2013 against Bosnia and Herzegovina.

=== International goals ===
Pāvels Mihadjuks: International Goals
| # | Date | Venue | Opponent | Score | Result | Competition |
|---|---|---|---|---|---|---|
| 1. | 7 June 2011 | Graz, Austria | Austria | 0 – 1 | 3–1 | Friendly |

== Honours ==
=== RKB Arma-Rīga ===
- Latvian First League champion
  - 2002

=== FK Ventspils ===
- Latvian Higher League champion
  - 2008

=== Dundee United ===
- Scottish Cup winner
  - 2009-2010

=== FK Liepāja ===
- Latvian Higher League champion
  - 2015

=== FK Spartaks Jūrmala ===
- Latvian Higher League champion
  - 2016, 2017
