= Yusaku Toyoshima =

Japanese association football player

Personal information
- Full name: Yusaku Toyoshima
- Date of birth: July 6, 1991 (age 35)
- Place of birth: Tsukubamirai, Ibaraki, Japan
- Height: 1.70 m (5 ft 7 in)
- Position: Midfielder

Team information
- Current team: Tochigi Uva FC
- Number: 24

Youth career
- 2002–2009: Kashiwa Reysol

Senior career*
Years	Team	Apps	(Gls)
2011–2012	C.S. Visé		
2012–2013	FC Zaria Bălți	15	(2)
2013	FC Jūrmala	14	(0)
2014–2015	FK Lovćen	0	(0)
2014–2015	→ FK Berane (loan)	22	(2)
2015–2016	Grulla Morioka	1	(0)
2017–	Tochigi Uva FC		
- * Club domestic league appearances and goals as of 23 February 2017

Yusaku Toyoshima (豊嶋 邑作, Toyoshima Yūsaku; born July 6, 1991, in Tsukubamirai, Ibaraki) is a Japanese football player for Tochigi Uva FC.

== Career ==
Toyoshima played with Kashiwa Reysol Academy from 2002 till 2009. During that period he got to be part of the Japanese national U14 and U15 teams. In August 2010, aged 20, he joins C.S. Visé playing in the 2011–12 Belgian Second Division. Next, he plays with FC Zaria Bălți in the 2012–13 Moldovan National Division, then he joined FC Jūrmala playing in the 2013 Latvian Higher League. During winter-break of the 2013–14 season he joined Montenegrin side FK Lovćen, however made no appearances in the 2013–14 Montenegrin First League. Following season Toyoshima was loaned to FK Berane playing with them in the 2014–15 Montenegrin First League.

== Club statistics ==
Updated to 23 February 2017.

Club performance			League		Cup		Total	
Season	Club	League	Apps	Goals	Apps	Goals	Apps	Goals
Japan			League		Emperor's Cup		Total	
2015	Grulla Morioka	J3 League	1	0	0	0	1	0
2016	Grulla Morioka	J3 League	0	0	0	0	0	0
Career total			1	0	0	0	1	0
