= Alexandru Namașco =

Moldovan footballer

Alexandru Namaşco
Personal information
- Full name: Alexandru Namaşco
- Date of birth: 9 October 1981 (age 45)
- Place of birth: Mălăieşti, Soviet Union
- Height: 1.81 m (5 ft 11 1/2 in)
- Position: Midfielder

Team information
- Current team: Speranţa Crihana Veche

Senior career*
Years	Team	Apps	(Gls)
2001	Sheriff Tiraspol	2	(0)
2002–2004	FC Tiraspol	50	(2)
2005–2009	Dinamo Bender	110	(16)
2010	Dynamo Bryansk	13	(0)
2011–2012	Torpedo Moscow	23	(0)
2012–	Speranţa Crihana Veche	10	(1)

International career
2004	Moldova	1	(0)
- * Club domestic league appearances and goals as of 07:13, 1 June 2012 (UTC)

Alexandru Namaşco (born 9 October 1981) is a Moldovan professional football player. He plays for FC Speranţa Crihana Veche.
