= Juanma (footballer, born 1986) =

Spanish footballer

Personal information
- Full name: Juan Manuel Hernández Sánchez
- Date of birth: 22 July 1986 (age 40)
- Place of birth: Jaén, Spain
- Height: 1.70 m (5 ft 7 in)
- Position: Midfielder

Senior career*
Years	Team	Apps	(Gls)
2004–2005	Mataró	21	(2)
2005–2010	Espanyol B	92	(15)
2008–2009	→ Cádiz (loan)	25	(9)
2009–2010	→ Girona (loan)	29	(1)
2010–2011	Almería B	25	(2)
2011	Leganés	1	(0)
2011–2012	Lleida Esportiu	22	(2)
2012–2013	Badalona	23	(1)
2014	Jūrmala	8	(5)
2019	Sant Julià	10	(3)
- * Club domestic league appearances and goals

Juan Manuel Hernández Sánchez (born 22 July 1986), known as Juanma, is a Spanish former professional footballer who played as a midfielder.
