= Daniel Romero =

Argentine footballer

Personal information
- Full name: Héctor Daniel Romero
- Date of birth: March 20, 1985 (age 41)
- Place of birth: Buenos Aires, Argentina
- Height: 1.71 m (5 ft 7 in)
- Position: Defender

Team information
- Current team: Villa Mitre

Senior career*
Years	Team	Apps	(Gls)
2005–2008	Gimnasia LP	31	(1)
2009	Chacarita Juniors	17	(0)
2010–2011	Shahrdari Bandar Abbas	?	(3)
2012–2013	Guaraní Antonio Franco	9	(0)
2013	Nueva Chicago	3	(0)
2014–2015	FC Jūrmala	6	(0)
2015–	Villa Mitre		
- * Club domestic league appearances and goals as of 17 May 2015

Héctor Daniel Romero (born 20 March 1985) is an Argentinian football defender who plays for Villa Mitre of the Torneo Argentino B in Argentine.
