= Vugar Asgarov =

Azerbaijani footballer (born 1985)

Vüqar Asgarov
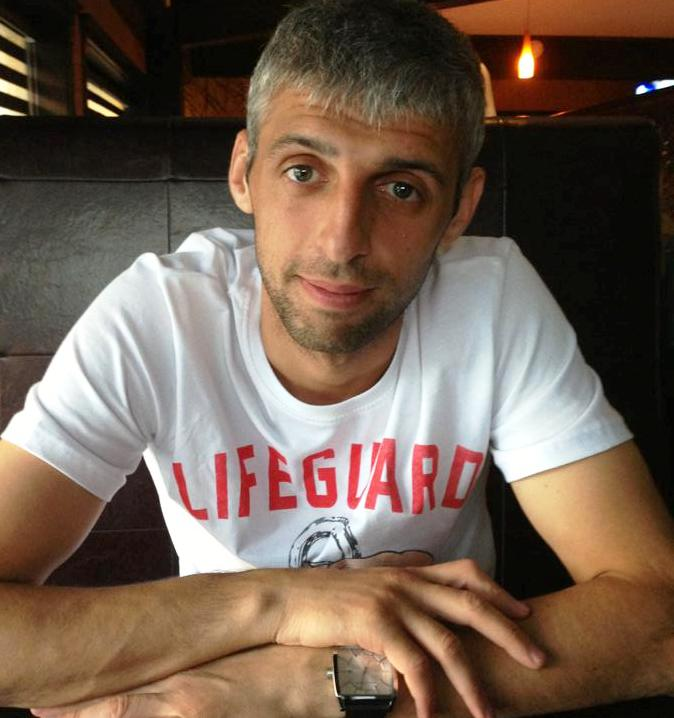

Personal information
- Full name: Vüqar Asgarov
- Date of birth: 14 May 1985 (age 41)
- Place of birth: Sumgayit, Azerbaijan SSR
- Height: 1.84 m (6 ft 0 in)
- Position: Striker

Team information
- Current team: Super Nova
- Number: 7

Senior career*
Years	Team	Apps	(Gls)
2007–2008	Liepājas Metalurgs II	27	(15)
2008–2009	Jelgava	0	(0)
2009–2010	Jūrmala	8	(4)
2010–2011	Varavīksne	11	(11)
2011–2013	Liepājas Metalurgs	31	(6)
2013	Sumgayit	12	(2)
2014	Araz-Naxçıvan	2	(0)
2014–2015	Zira	12	(3)
2015	1625 Liepāja	15	(22)
2016–2017	Progress / AFA Olaine	46	(57)
2018–2019	Daugavpils	20	(24)
2019	Liepāja	10	(1)
2020	Daugavpils	5	(1)
2020–	Super Nova	5	(3)

International career
2012–2013	Azerbaijan	3	(0)
- * Club domestic league appearances and goals as of 20:09, 9 February 2021 (UTC)

Vüqar Asgarov (Azerbaijani: Vüqar Əsgərov; born 14 May 1985 in Sumgayit) is an Azerbaijani football second striker who currently plays for SK Super Nova. He also holds Latvian citizenship.

== Career ==
Vüqar Asgarov was born in Azerbaijan, but moved to Latvia in an early age. Vüqar Asgarov began his career in Liepājas Metalurgs system and there he played until 2008. Later he played for Latvian First League clubs FK Jelgava and FC Jūrmala. In 2010, Äsgärov joined another Latvian First League side SFK Varavīksne and after scoring a goal against Metalurgs in Latvian Cup, he was invited to join them. After three years with Liepājas Metalurgs, he left Latvia and signed for Azerbaijani club Sumgayit a two-year contract. In December 2013, Äsgärov left Sumgayit, and whilst looking for a new club trained with his old club Liepājas Metalurgs

In June 2014, Asgarov signed for newly promoted Azerbaijan Premier League side Araz-Naxçıvan.

== International career ==
Asgarov made his debut for Azerbaijan national team on 24 February 2012 against Singapore.
