= 2014 Latvian First League =

Latvian football league season for the second division

SYFORM Latvijas 1.līga
- Season: 2014
- Champions: Gulbene

The 2014 Latvian First League started on 30 March 2014 and ended on 8 November 2014.

== League table ==
Pos	Team	Pld	W	D	L	GF	GA	GD	Pts	Promotion or relegation
1	Gulbene	30	27	3	0	128	11	+117	84	Promotion to Virslīga
2	Rēzeknes BJSS	30	25	2	3	118	27	+91	77	Qualification for promotion/relegation play-offs
3	Valmiera Glass FK/BSS	30	22	2	6	105	34	+71	68	
4	FK 1625 Liepāja	30	21	4	5	87	34	+53	67	
5	FK Rīgas Futbola skola	30	18	4	8	104	39	+65	58	
6	FK Auda	30	18	1	11	68	42	+26	55	
7	FK Tukums-2000	30	15	5	10	88	53	+35	50	
8	FK Ogre	30	11	4	15	60	50	+10	37	
9	FK Jēkabpils/JSC	30	10	7	13	50	71	−21	37	
10	Preiļu BJSS	30	10	1	19	60	92	−32	31	
11	AFA Olaine	30	8	6	16	51	81	−30	30	
12	SFK United	30	7	8	15	38	56	−18	29	
13	JFK Saldus	30	8	1	21	37	86	−49	25	
14	FK Smiltene/BJSS	30	5	9	16	37	77	−40	24	
15	Salaspils FC	30	2	7	21	24	84	−60	13	
16	FK Pļaviņas DM	30	0	2	28	10	228	−218	2	Relegation to 2.līga

Source: rsssf.com
Rules for classification: 1) points; 2) goal difference; 3) number of goals scored.
