= Iddrisu Abdallah =

Ghanaian football player

Personal information
- Date of birth: 20 January 1996 (age 30)
- Place of birth: Accra, Ghana
- Height: 1.90 m (6 ft 3 in)
- Position: Striker

Youth career
- 2005–2006: Kingdok Academy
- 2007–2009: Volta Warriors Academy
- 2009–2014: Golden Tulip FC

Senior career*
Years	Team	Apps	(Gls)
2014	OPS	4	(0)
2015	Medeama	7	(2)
2016	Bechem United	6	(0)
2017	CD Costa do Sol	16	(8)
2019	Tulsa Roughnecks	3	(0)

International career
2013	Ghana U17		
2016	Ghana U20		
- * Club domestic league appearances and goals as of 21:43, 3 July 2019 (UTC)

Iddrisu Abdallah (born 20 January 1996) is a Ghanaian football player. Abdallah has formerly played for Bechem United F.C. and won the 2016 Ghanaian FA Cup, and (2016–2017) at Oulun Palloseura.

== Early career ==
Iddrisu began his club career with Kingdok Academy debuting in the 2005–2006 season. Prior to the beginning of the junior league in 2007–2008, Iddrisu signed for Volta Warriors Academy. He had a long spell at Golden Tulip FC also before moving in the summer transfer at Oulun Palloseura in early 2014. He later moved to Medeama S.C. in 2015–2016.

=== Bechem United F.C. ===
In January 2016 Iddrisu signed a 1,5-year deal with Bechem United F.C. with whom he won the 2016 Ghanaian FA Cup and tooted as a fan favorite.

=== CD Costa do Sol ===
After a brief stint playing in the Ghana Premier league with Bechem United, he joined Mozambican club CD Costa do Sol in January 2017 on a one-year deal. Aballah scored the only goal as CD Costa do sol beat Desportivo de Maputo 1-0 for the trophy in Maputo.

=== Tulsa Roughnecks ===
On 31 December 2018, Abdallah signed with United Soccer League side Tulsa Roughnecks ahead of 2019 season. Abdallah was released by Tulsa on July 3, 2019.

== International ==
Iddrisu has represented the Ghana U20 two times and the Ghana U17 four times.

== Honours ==
=== Club ===
Bechem United

- 2016- Ghanaian FA Cup

CD Costa do Sol

- 2017- Taça de Moçambique
- 2017- Moçambola- Runner Up (2nd)

=== Personal ===
Golden Tulip FC

- 2012-2013 - Second Highest Goal Scorer in the second division league with 9 goals.
- 2012-2013 - MVP award as a Youngest Best Player in the Second division league
