= Richmond Nketiah =

Ghanaian footballer (born 1994)

Personal information
- Full name: Richmond Nketiah
- Date of birth: 28 October 1994 (age 32)
- Place of birth: Techiman, Ghana
- Height: 1.75 m (5 ft 9 in)
- Positions: Right-back; defensive midfielder

Senior career*
Years	Team	Apps	(Gls)
2011–2012	Nania		
2012–2013	Medeama	9	(1)
2014	Jūrmala	14	(0)
2015	FC Babīte		
2016	Arsenal Tula	0	(0)
2017	SK Babīte	0	(0)

International career
- Ghana U20
- * Club domestic league appearances and goals

Richmond Nketiah (born 28 October 1994) is a Ghanaian footballer who plays as a right back or defensive midfielder.

== Club career ==
He signed a contract with the Russian team FC Arsenal Tula before the 2015–16 season, but was unable to play for the team due to health issues.

In March 2017, he joined Latvian club SK Babīte.

== International career ==
In 2013, coach Sellas Tetteh called him up to be a member of the Ghana U20 for the African Youth Championship in Algeria and for the FIFA U-20 World Cup in Turkey.
