= Ghenadie Ochincă =

Moldovan footballer

Personal information
- Date of birth: 1 March 1984 (age 42)
- Place of birth: Kishinev, Moldovan SSR, Soviet Union
- Height: 1.84 m (6 ft 1/2 in)
- Position: Defender

Team information
- Current team: Dacia Buiucani
- Number: 3

Senior career*
Years	Team	Apps	(Gls)
2005–2008	Politehnica Chișinău	49	(0)
2008	Gloria Buzău	1	(0)
2009	Iskra-Stal	10	(0)
2010	Rapid Ghidighici	15	(0)
2011	Academia Chișinău	11	(0)
2011	Milsami Orhei	5	(0)
2012	Sfântul Gheorghe	3	(0)
2012–2013	Speranța Crihana Veche	14	(1)
2015–2016	Speranța Nisporeni	18	(1)
2017	Sfântul Gheorghe	7	(0)
2018–2020	Codru Lozova	3	(0)
2020–	Dacia Buiucani	1	(0)

International career
2001	Moldova U16	1	(0)
2005	Moldova U21	1	(0)
- * Club domestic league appearances and goals as of 6 April 2021

Ghenadie Ochincă (born 1 March 1984) is a Moldovan footballer who plays as a defender for Dacia Buiucani in the Moldovan National Division.

He previously played for numerous Moldovan top-division clubs, and for Gloria Buzău in the Romanian Liga I. He was capped for Moldova at under-16 and under-21 level.

== Club career ==
Ochincă was born in Kishinev, then in the Moldovan SSR, Soviet Union, which is now Chișinău, Moldova.

He played football for Politehnica Chişinău from 2005 until the 2007–08 season winter break.

After a trial with Universitatea Cluj where he impressed, but whose sporting director felt they needed more established players to assist their fight against relegation, Ochincă signed a four-and-a-half-year contract with Romanian Liga I side Gloria Buzău for a salary reported as €20,000 per season. The move was completed on 28 February 2008 after a delay in obtaining international clearance. He said he dreamt of playing for a big European club, and was making an important move by coming to a much stronger league than in Moldova. However, he made only one league appearance in six months with the club, playing the whole of the 2–0 away defeat at Unirea Urziceni on 20 March, before being transfer-listed. If he was unable to find another top-flight club in Romania, he was expected to return home to Moldova.

He had a trial with Romanian Liga II club Unirea Alba Iulia in August 2008, but ended up back home in Moldova with Iskra-Stal. He played ten league games, and made two substitute appearances in the second qualifying round of the Europa League, before Iskra-Stal released him during the 2009–10 winter break.

He then played for FC Rapid Ghidighici.

After a trial with Sfîntul Gheorghe in January 2011, he joined Academia UTM. He made 11 appearances in the top division before leaving at the end of the season.

In June 2011, he signed a two-year contract with Milsami, and went straight into the squad for the club's first ever match in European competition, the Europa League first qualifying round away to Dinamo Tbilisi four days later. He had an eventful debut: within seven minutes of replacing Adrian Grigoruță in the second half, he made an error that led to Dinamo's second goal and then received a yellow card for fouling the goalscorer. He played only a few league games before completing the season with Sfîntul Gheorghe.

In June 2012 he joined Speranţa Crihana Veche, newly promoted to the National Division.

== International career ==
Ochincă represented Moldova under-16 team during the qualification campaign for the 2001 UEFA Under-16 Championships. He made his debut in a 2–2 draw against Israel on 5 March 2001. In February 2005, he was capped for the under-21 team, coming on as a late substitute in a friendly match away to Romania under-21 which Moldova lost 2–1.
