= Vladislavs Sorokins =

Latvian footballer (born 1997)

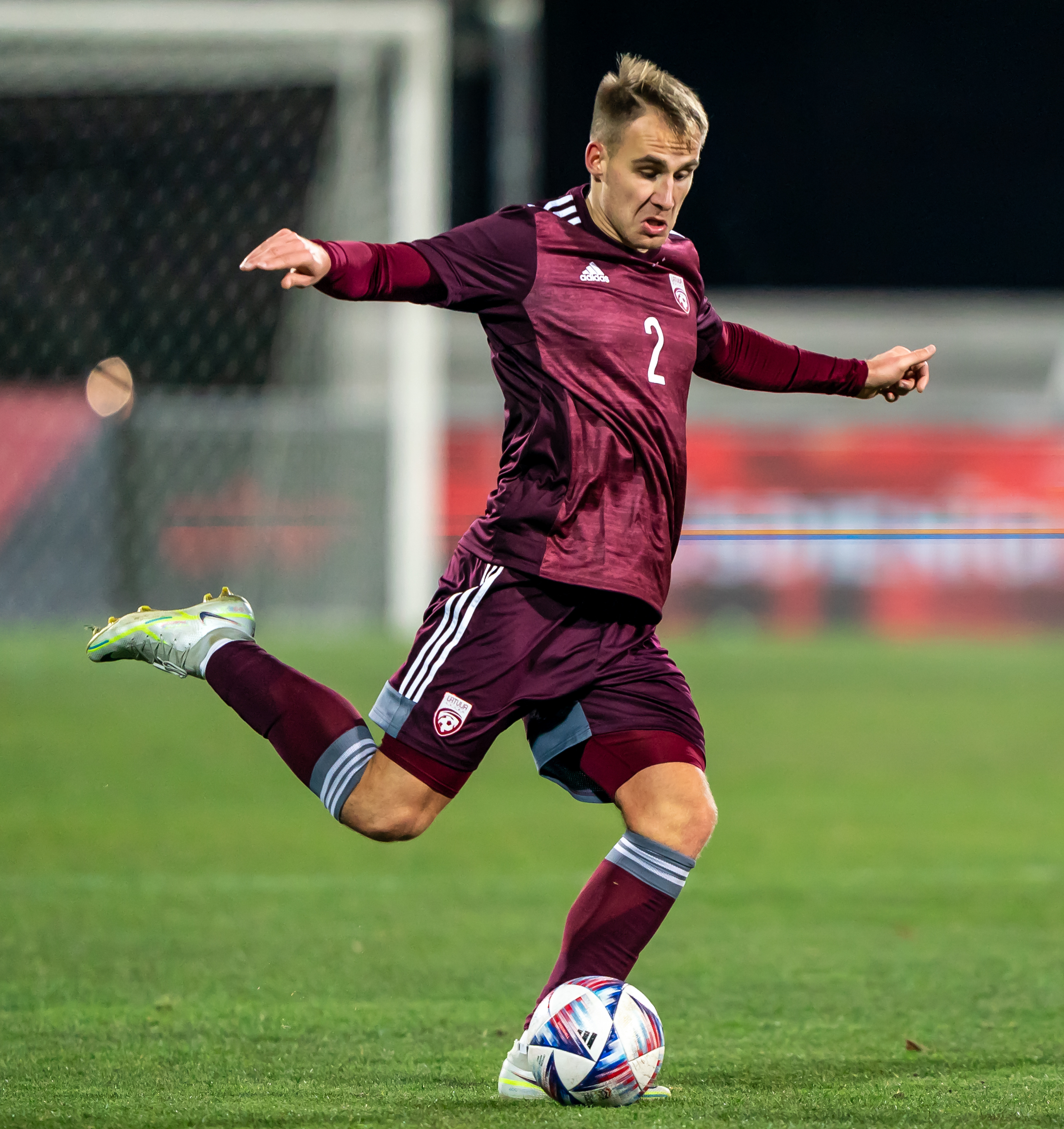

Personal information
- Date of birth: 10 May 1997 (age 29)
- Place of birth: Riga, Latvia
- Height: 1.80 m (5 ft 11 in)
- Position: Left-back

Team information
- Current team: Liepāja
- Number: 35

Youth career
- –2013: Skonto

Senior career*
Years	Team	Apps	(Gls)
2013	Skonto II		
2014–2015	Skonto	13	(1)
2016	Jelgava	9	(0)
2016–2023	RFS	155	(1)
2024	Kyzylzhar	21	(0)
2025–	Liepāja	63	(2)

International career^{‡}
2012	Latvia U16	2	(0)
2013–2014	Latvia U17	17	(0)
2014	Latvia U18	2	(0)
2014–2015	Latvia U19	15	(0)
2016–2018	Latvia U21	23	(0)
2020–	Latvia	10	(0)
- * Club domestic league appearances and goals as of 12 November 2026 ‡ National team caps and goals as of 27 November 2024

Vladislavs Sorokins (born 10 May 1997) is a Latvian footballer who plays as a left-back for Liepāja and the Latvia national team.

== Club career ==
On 10 January 2025, Sorokins signed with Liepāja.

== International career ==
Sorokins made his international debut for Latvia on 11 November 2020 in a friendly match against San Marino.

== Career statistics ==
=== International ===
As of 11 November 2020

Latvia
Year	Apps	Goals
2020	1	0
Total	1	0
