= Sekyi Quaye =

Ghanaian footballer

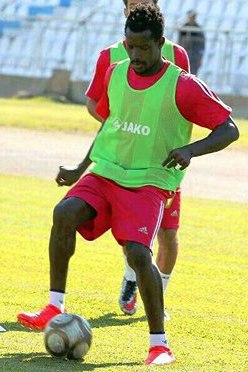
- Quaye for Al Egtmaaey Tripoli in 2016

Personal information
- Date of birth: 16 June 1990 (age 36)
- Place of birth: Tema, Greater Accra, Ghana
- Height: 1.80 m (5 ft 11 in)
- Positions: Defender; midfielder

Youth career
- Tema Youth

Senior career*
Years	Team	Apps	(Gls)
2011–2012	New Edubiase United	25	(5)
2012–2014	Mighty Jets	32	(9)
2014	FC Jūrmala	2	(0)
2016–2018	Egtmaaey Tripoli	9	(0)

International career
2014	Ghana U20	1	(0)
- * Club domestic league appearances and goals

Sekyi Quaye (born 16 June 1990) is a Ghanaian professional footballer who last played as a defender or midfielder for Lebanese club Egtmaaey Tripoli.

== Early life ==
Quaye was born and raised in Tema, Greater Accra in Ghana. He began his football career for Tema Youth. He played his coast football for Phitizo FC, a colt juvenile team located in Ghana.

== Club career ==
Quaye has played for Tema Youth, where he scored five goals in all competitions, before moving to New Edubiase United. After successful seasons with the club, he later joined Ghanaian Division One League club Tudu Mighty Jets.

In 2014, Quaye moved to Latvia to sign a three-year contract with first league outfit FC Jūrmala.

On 8 September 2016, Quaye moved to Lebanon to sign a one-year deal with Egtmaaey Tripoli, where he played as a midfielder. He moved to the top flight club in 2016. In his debut match with the Lebanon outfit, he inspired Egtmaaey to a 3–2 win over Shabab Sahel by providing two first-half assists.

== International career ==
Quaye made his official debut for Ghana U20 in 2014.
