= Dāvis Indrāns =

Latvian footballer (born 1995)

Personal information
- Date of birth: 6 June 1995 (age 31)
- Place of birth: Riga, Latvia
- Height: 1.82 m (5 ft 11 1/2 in)
- Position: Midfielder

Team information
- Current team: Alberts
- Number: 5

Senior career*
Years	Team	Apps	(Gls)
2013–2014	Ventspils	4	(0)
2015	Skonto	3	(0)
2016–2018	METTA/Latvijas	45	(6)
2018–2019	RFS	17	(2)
2019–2020	Jelgava	36	(4)
2020	Valmiera	1	(0)
2021	JFK Ventspils	12	(0)
2021	Alberts	8	(1)
2022	Super Nova	12	(0)
2022–	Alberts	82	(22)

International career^{‡}
2012–2013	Latvia U-18	2	(1)
2013	Latvia U-19	5	(0)
2014–2015	Latvia U-21	9	(1)
2017–	Latvia	10	(0)
- * Club domestic league appearances and goals as of 15 June 2026 ‡ National team caps and goals as of 12:17, 3 June 2019 (UTC)

Dāvis Indrāns (born 6 June 1995) is a Latvian football player. He plays for Alberts.

== International ==
He made his debut for the Latvia national football team on 9 June 2017 in a World Cup qualifier group game against Portugal.
