= Vitalie Zlatan =

Moldovan footballer

Personal information
- Full name: Vitalie Zlatan
- Date of birth: 8 April 1993 (age 33)
- Place of birth: Chișinău, Moldova
- Height: 1.85 m (6 ft 1 in)
- Position: Striker

Team information
- Current team: FC Iskra-Stal
- Number: 93

Youth career
- Zimbru Chișinău

Senior career*
Years	Team	Apps	(Gls)
2011–2012	FC Sfîntul Gheorghe	7	(0)
2012–2013	FC Iskra-Stal	7	(3)
- * Club domestic league appearances and goals as of 15 April 2013

Vitalie Zlatan (born 8 April 1993, Chișinău, Moldova) is a Moldavian football striker who plays for FC Iskra-Stal.

== Club statistics ==
- Total matches played in Moldavian First League: 14 matches – 3 goals
