= Firuz Bobiev =

Tajikistani footballer

Personal information
- Date of birth: 18 June 1992 (age 34)
- Place of birth: Dushanbe, Tajikistan
- Height: 1.75 m (5 ft 9 in)
- Position: Midfielder

Team information
- Current team: Regar-TadAZ
- Number: 10

Senior career*
Years	Team	Apps	(Gls)
2009	Academia	6	(4)
2010	Sfîntul Gheorghe	7	(3)
2010	Gagauziya-Oguzsport	10	(5)
2011–2012	Istiklol		
2012–2014	Speranța Crihana Veche	22	(1)
2014	Petrocub Hîncești		
2015–2019	Khujand		
2020–2021	CSKA Pamir	27	(5)
2022–	Regar-TadAZ	62	(1)
- * Club domestic league appearances and goals as of 16 March 2026

Firuz Bobiev (Russian: Фируз Бобиев; born 18 June 1992) is a Tajikistani prfessional footballer who plays as a midfielder for Regar-TadAZ.

== Career ==
Bobiev started his career with Moldovan side Academia, where he made 6 league appearances and scored 4 goals. On 25 July 2009, Bobiev debuted for Academia during a 2–1 win over Nistru. Before the 2011 season, he signed for Istiklol in Tajikistan, helping them win the league.

In 2012, he signed for Moldovan club Speranța (Crihana Veche). Before the 2015 season, Bobiev signed for Khujand in Tajikistan.
