= SFK United =

Latvian football club

- Founded: 1999
- Dissolved: 2014 (adult team)
- Ground: Riga Secondary School No. 49 Stadium, Riga
- 2014: 12th (First League)
- Website: https://rigafc-academy.lv/

SFK United is a Latvian football club, which existed as an adult team of the youth academy Šitika Futbola skola (Šitika FS, ŠFK) from 2013 to 2014. They competed in Latvian First League and the Latvian Football Cup in 2014.

Šitika FS, which was founded by Genādijs Šitiks on 7 December 1999, was acquired by Riga FC in 2017 (then called Šitika Futbola Akadēmija "Rīga", Šitika FA; Šitiks Football Academy) and operates as one of its youth academies, Riga FC Academy since 2019.

In 2020, the academy also founded Futbola skola "Rīga" (Football School "Riga") as a professional education institution for football coaches.
