= Shotaro Okada =

Japanese footballer

Personal information
- Date of birth: 14 September 1988 (age 38)
- Height: 1.64 m (5 ft 5 in)
- Position: Midfielder

Youth career
- –2011: Momoyama Gakuin University

Senior career*
Years	Team	Apps	(Gls)
2011–2013	Olimpia Bălţi	38	(1)
2013	Skonto	7	(0)
2013	Termalica Bruk-Bet	0	(0)
2014	Concordia Elbląg	16	(2)
- * Club domestic league appearances and goals

Shotaro Okada (岡田翔太郎, Okada Shotaro; born 14 September 1988) is a Japanese former professional footballer who played as a midfielder.

== Career statistics ==
Club	Season	League			National cup (Note: Includes Latvian Cup)		Other		Total	
Club	Season	Division	Apps	Goals	Apps	Goals	Apps	Goals	Apps	Goals
Olimpia Bălţi	2011–12	Moldovan National Division	22	0	0	0	0	0	22	0
Olimpia Bălţi	2012–13	Moldovan National Division	16	1	0	0	0	0	16	1
Olimpia Bălţi	Total		38	1	0	0	0	0	38	1
Skonto	2013	Latvian First League	7	0	1	0	0	0	8	0
Concordia Elbląg	2013–14	II liga	16	2	0	0	—		16	2
Career total			4	0	0	0	0	0	4	0
