= Oleksiy Tyshchenko =

Ukrainian footballer

Personal information
- Full name: Oleksiy Viktorovych Tyshchenko
- Date of birth: 21 July 1994 (age 32)
- Place of birth: Mykolaiv, Ukraine
- Height: 1.86 m (6 ft 1 in)
- Position: Midfielder

Team information
- Current team: Myr Hornostayivka
- Number: 13

Youth career
- 2007–2008: Youth Sportive School Mykolaiv
- 2008: BRW-VIK Volodymyr-Volynskyi
- 2008–2011: Torpedo Mykolaiv

Senior career*
Years	Team	Apps	(Gls)
2011	Dynamo Khmelnytskyi	8	(0)
2012–2013	Kryvbas Kryvyi Rih	0	(0)
2014	Tavriya Simferopol	1	(0)
2014	Jūrmala	11	(1)
2016–2017	FC Vradiivka		
2017–2018	Krymteplytsia Molodizhne		
2018	FC Kyzyltash Bakhchisaray		
2019–	Myr Hornostayivka	0	(0)
- * Club domestic league appearances and goals as of 5 February 2015

Oleksiy Tyshchenko (Ukrainian: Олексій Вікторович Тищенко; born 21 July 1994) is a professional Ukrainian football midfielder who plays for Myr Hornostayivka.

== Club career ==
Tyshchenko is the product of Mykolaiv youth sportive school and FC Torpedo Mykolaiv. His first trainer was Hennadiy Levytskyi. He signed a contract with SC Tavriya in February 2014. He made his debut for SC Tavriya Simferopol as a substituted player in the game against FC Illichivets Mariupol on 16 May 2014 in the Ukrainian Premier League. In July 2014, Tyshchenko moved to the Latvian Higher League, signing a contract with FC Jūrmala. Under the management of former Manchester United player Andrei Kanchelskis, he played 11 league matches, scoring one goal. Tyshchenko scored in a 2–1 defeat against FC Jūrmala rivals FK Spartaks Jūrmala on 18 October 2014.
