= Levan Makharadze =

Georgian footballer (born 1993)

Personal information
- Full name: Levan Shalvovych Makharadze
- Date of birth: 14 August 1993 (age 33)
- Place of birth: Tbilisi, Georgia
- Height: 1.90 m (6 ft 3 in)
- Position: Defender

Youth career
- 2009–2010: Dnipro Dnipropetrovsk

Senior career*
Years	Team	Apps	(Gls)
2010-2012	Dnipro-2 Dnipropetrovsk	26	(1)
2013–2015	Illichivets Mariupol	0	(0)
2015	Skonto	7	(0)
2016	Inhulets Petrove	10	(2)
2016	Kolos Kovalivka	2	(0)
2017	Cherkashchyna	6	(0)
2017	Sumy	17	(1)
2018	Zalla	?	(?)
2018–2020	Ordino	46	(1)
- * Club domestic league appearances and goals

Levan Shalvovych Makharadze (Ukrainian: Леван Шалвович Махарадзе; born 14 August 1993) is a Georgian footballer who is last known to have played as a defender for Ordino.

== Career ==
Born in Georgia, he spent his youth career in Ukraine at the FC Dnipro academy.

Makharadez started his senior career with Mariupol.

Before the 2015 season, Makharadze signed for Latvian side Skonto.

In the second half of 2015–16, he signed for Ukrainian third division club Inhulets, where he made 10 league appearances and scored 2 goals.

In 2016, he signed for Kolos Kovalivka.

In the second half of 2017–18, Makharadze signed for Zalla in the Spanish fifth division after playing for Ukrainian second division outfit Sumy.

In 2018, he signed for Ordino in Andorra.
