= Mălăiești, Orhei =

Mălăiești
- Commune
- Location in Moldova
- Coordinates: 47°27′42″N 28°40′04″E
- Country: Moldova
- District: Orhei District

Population (2014)
  - Total: 3,143
- Time zone: UTC+2 (EET)
  - Summer (DST): UTC+3 (EEST)

Mălăiești is a commune in Orhei District, Moldova. It is composed of two villages, Mălăiești and Tîrzieni.
