= FK 1625 Liepāja =

Latvian football club

- Full name: Futbola klubs 1625 Liepāja
- Founded: 1999
- Dissolved: 2016
- Ground: Daugava Stadium Reserve Pitch, Liepāja, Latvia
- Capacity: 5,083
- Chairman: Ivo Bergmanis
- Manager: Dmitrijs Kalašņikovs
- League: First League
- 2014: 4th
- Website: http://www.1625.lv/
Home colours	Away colours

Futbola klubs 1625 Liepāja, previously SFK Varavīksne (English: SFC Rainbow), was a football club based in Liepāja that last played in Latvian football's second tier, the First League.

== History ==
The club was founded on December 14, 1999, as SFK Varavīksne and until 2010 played in the Second League. Informally, the football team had existed since 1997. In 2010, Varavīksne won the Second League and were promoted to the First League.

SFK Varavīksne was renamed FK 1625 Liepāja in February 2014. In 1625, Liepāja was awarded town rights.

Due to financial difficulties and citing a lack of support from the municipality (which it disputed), the club was dissolved before the 2016 season. As late as 2021, a team of the same name (albeit with a different crest) played in regional mini football tournaments.

=== Names ===
- SFK Varavīksne
- SFK Varavīksne/V.O.V.A. (sponsorship, around 2007–2008)
- FK 1625 Liepāja

== Honours ==
- Latvian Second League
  - Winners: 2010

== League and Cup history ==
Season	Division (Name)	Pos./Teams	Latvian Football Cup
2008	Second League	2/(4)	1/16
2009	Second League	3	Not Held
2010	Second League	1/(7)	1/8
2011	First League	5/(13)	1/16
2012	First League	7/(14)	1/8
2013	First League	10/(16)	1/8
2014	First League	4/(16)	1/8
2015	First League		

== Players ==
=== First-team squad ===
As of 8 May 2015

Note: Flags indicate national team as defined under FIFA eligibility rules; some limited exceptions apply. Players may hold more than one non-FIFA nationality.

No.	Pos.	Nation	Player
1	GK	LVA	Pauls Volgemuts
2	MF	LVA	Agris Otaņķis
5	DF	LVA	Aleksandrs Gusevs
6	DF	LVA	Ivans Gluško
7	MF	LVA	Kristiāns Božis
8	MF	LVA	Jans Bespjorstovs
9	FW	AZE	Vugar Asgarov
10	FW	FRA	Andrely Makela
11	DF	LVA	Ivo Skripko (captain)
12	GK	LVA	Toms Vīksna
13	MF	LVA	Oļegs Tkačovs

No.	Pos.	Nation	Player
14	MF	LVA	Jans Bespjorstovs
15	MF	LVA	Roberts Pirktiņš
16	MF	RUS	Mikhail Zaitsev
21	DF	LVA	Ņikita Aržeņinovs
25	MF	LVA	Romāns Gladiļins
26	MF	LVA	Daniels Vasiljevs
51	DF	LVA	Jurijs Teretenko
52	MF	LVA	Mārtiņš Kalinčenko
61	MF	LVA	Juris Kučma
65	MF	LVA	Arturs Liatukas
66	MF	UKR	Yuriy Krasnovomets
