= FC Jūrmala =

Latvian football club

- Full name: Futbola Centrs Jūrmala (Football Center Jūrmala)
- Founded: 2008
- Dissolved: 2015
- Ground: Sloka Stadium, Jūrmala
- Capacity: 5,000
- Chairman: Aleksandrs Burņins
- League: Latvian First League
- 2014: 10th (Relegated)
- Website: www.jurmalafc.lv
Home colours	Away colours

FC Jūrmala was a Latvian football club from Jūrmala, founded in 2008. They last played in the Latvian First League. The home ground was Sloka Stadium in Jūrmala with capacity of 5,000 people. Until 2015, FC Jūrmala was one of two teams representing the city in the top tier and using this stadium. The last manager of the team was Andrei Kanchelskis.

== History ==
The club was founded in 2008 as a participant of the second tier of Latvian football. Having spent the first three seasons there, years 2008, 2009 and 2010 respectively, the club managed to achieve its best result in 2010. Following the 13th position in 2008 and the 4th position in 2009, the following year Jūrmala finished the championship in the second position. They were automatically promoted to the top tier of Latvian football. The following season in the Latvian Higher League was unexpectedly successful, as they took up the 5th position in the league table.

In 2012 and 2013 Jūrmala found itself in the middle of the table, taking the 6th position. In 2014 the club finished the league in the 10th position, followed by economic problems and sanctions from the Latvian Football Federation due to long-term debts and unpaid wages. In the end, FC Jūrmala ended up last in the league table and was relegated to the Latvian First League.

The financial problems of the club were not solved and the team did not apply for a First League licence. Ultimately, the club asked to be expelled from the Latvian Football Federation on 31 March 2015 and folded.

== League and Cup history ==
Season	Division (Name)	Pos./Teams	Pl.	W	D	L	GS	GA	P	Latvian Football Cup
2008	2nd (1.līga)	13/(15)	28	5	6	17	30	65	21	3rd Round
2009	2nd (1.līga)	4/(14)	26	15	5	6	46	18	66	1/8 finals
2010	2nd (1.līga)	2/(12)	22	14	4	4	47	19	46	Did not participate
2011	1st (Virslīga)	5/(9)	32	12	8	12	46	43	44	1/16 finals
2012	1st (Virslīga)	6/(10)	36	10	9	17	47	49	39	1/4 finals
2013	1st (Virslīga)	6/(10)	27	7	5	15	20	52	26	1/4 finals
2014	1st (Virslīga)	10/(10)	36	2	6	28	29	108	7	1/4 finals

== Managers ==
- (Latvia) Andrejs Karpovs (2008–10)
- (Latvia) Andrejs Kolidzejs (caretaker) (2010–11)
- (Russia) Soferbi Yeshugov (April 1, 2011 – Aug 25, 2011)
- (Latvia) Igors V. Stepanovs (2011–12)
- (Russia) Vladimir Pachko (2012–13)
- (Latvia) Mihails Koņevs (2013 – May 2014)
- (Bulgaria) Gosho Iordanov Petkov (May 2014 – August 2014)
- (Russia) Andrei Kanchelskis (August 2014 – November 2014)

== Sponsors ==
Role	Sponsors
General sponsors	(Latvia) Jūrmalas Pilsētas Dome (Latvia) Interhaus
Kit manufacturer	(Italy) Givova
Other sponsors	(Latvia) SMP Bank (Latvia) AB Timber Group

== Players and staff ==
=== Current squad ===
As of 9 February 2015

Note: Flags indicate national team as defined under FIFA eligibility rules; some limited exceptions apply. Players may hold more than one non-FIFA nationality.

No.	Pos.	Nation	Player
1	GK	LVA	Vjačeslavs Kudrjavcevs
2	DF	GHA	Richmond Nketiah
3	MF	LVA	Maksims Župerko
5	DF	LVA	Deniss Sokoļskis
6	DF	LVA	Ivans Gluško
7	MF	UKR	Oleksiy Tyshchenko
8	DF	LVA	Juris Macuks
13	FW	LVA	Elvis Studāns
14	FW	LVA	Romāns Geiko
15	MF	LVA	Vlads Rimkus
17	FW	LVA	Maksims Miskovs

No.	Pos.	Nation	Player
18	FW	LVA	Rolands Smans
19	MF	GHA	Sekyi Quaye
24	MF	LVA	Maksims Semakins
26	DF	LVA	Normunds Miķelsons
27	FW	LVA	Edgars Kārkliņš
28	MF	RUS	Besarion Khardziani
41	MF	GEO	Giorgi Diakvnishvili
42	MF	EST	Tauno Mõttus
67	GK	LVA	Kristaps Dzelme
69	DF	RUS	Kirill Korban
99	DF	LVA	Dmitrijs Šiļuks

For recent transfers see: List of Latvian football transfers summer 2014 and List of Latvian football transfers winter 2014-15

==== Foreign players ====
Non-EU Nationals

- (Ghana) Richmond Nketiah
- (Ukraine) Oleksiy Tyshchenko

- (Ghana) Sekyi Quaye
- (Russia) Besarion Khardziani

- (Georgia (country)) Giorgi Diakvnishvili
- (Russia) Kirill Korban

EU Nationals

- (Estonia) Tauno Mõttus

=== Staff ===
Position	Name
Chairman	(Latvia) Aleksandrs Burņins
Manager	Vacant
Assistant manager	(Latvia) Nikolajs Poļakovs
Doctor	(Latvia) Aivars Veinbergs
Administrator	(Latvia) Andrejs Karacejevs
