= 2014–15 UEFA Europa League qualifying (first and second round matches) =

European football competition

This page summarises the matches of the first and second qualifying rounds of 2014–15 UEFA Europa League qualifying.

Times are CEST (UTC+2), as listed by UEFA (local times, if different, are in parentheses).

== First qualifying round ==
=== Summary ===
The first legs were played on 1 and 3 July, and the second legs were played on 8, 10 and 11 July 2014.

Team 1	Agg.	Team 2	1st leg	2nd leg
Sioni Bolnisi (Georgia (country))	4–4 (a)	(Albania) Flamurtari	2–3	2–1
Tiraspol (Moldova)	3–6	(Azerbaijan) Inter Baku	2–3	1–3
Hibernians (Malta)	2–9	(Slovakia) Spartak Trnava	2–4	0–5
Čukarički (Serbia)	4–0 (Note: Order of legs reversed after original draw.)	(Andorra) Sant Julià	4–0	0–0
Čelik Nikšić (Montenegro)	0–9	(Slovenia) Koper	0–5	0–4
Turnovo (North Macedonia)	1–4	(Georgia (country)) Chikhura Sachkhere	0–1	1–3
Shirak (Armenia)	1–6	(Kazakhstan) Shakhter Karagandy	1–2	0–4
Gabala (Azerbaijan)	0–5	(Bosnia and Herzegovina) Široki Brijeg	0–2	0–3
Diósgyőr (Hungary)	6–2	(Malta) Birkirkara	2–1	4–1
Vaduz (Liechtenstein)	4–0	(Gibraltar) College Europa	3–0	1–0
Veris Chișinău (Moldova)	0–3	(Bulgaria) Litex Lovech	0–0	0–3
UE Santa Coloma (Andorra)	0–5	(North Macedonia) Metalurg Skopje	0–3	0–2
Kairat (Kazakhstan)	1–0	(Albania) Kukësi	1–0	0–0
Folgore (San Marino)	1–5	(Montenegro) Budućnost Podgorica	1–2	0–3
RNK Split (Croatia)	3–1	(Armenia) Mika	2–0	1–1
Botev Plovdiv (Bulgaria)	6–0	(San Marino) Libertas	4–0	2–0
Željezničar (Bosnia and Herzegovina)	1–0	(Montenegro) Lovćen Cetinje	0–0	1–0
Shkëndija (North Macedonia)	2–3	(Moldova) Zimbru Chișinău	2–1	0–2
Sliema Wanderers (Malta)	2–3	(Hungary) Ferencváros	1–1	1–2
Pyunik (Armenia)	1–6	(Kazakhstan) Astana	1–4	0–2
Rudar Velenje (Slovenia)	2–2 (2–3 p)	(Albania) Laçi	1–1	1–1 (a.e.t.)
Differdange 03 (Luxembourg)	2–3	(Lithuania) Atlantas	1–0	1–3
VPS (Finland)	2–3	(Sweden) IF Brommapojkarna	2–1	0–2
B36 (Faroe Islands)	2–3	(Northern Ireland) Linfield	1–2	1–1
Fram (Iceland)	2–3	(Estonia) Nõmme Kalju	0–1	2–2
Rosenborg (Norway)	6–0	(Latvia) Jelgava	4–0	2–0
Derry City (Republic of Ireland)	9–0	(Wales) Aberystwyth Town	4–0	5–0
Aberdeen (Scotland)	8–0	(Latvia) Daugava Rīga	5–0	3–0
Santos Tartu (Estonia)	1–13	(Norway) Tromsø	0–7	1–6
Crusaders (Northern Ireland)	5–2	(Lithuania) Ekranas	3–1	2–1
Stjarnan (Iceland)	8–0	(Wales) Bangor City	4–0	4–0
Jeunesse Esch (Luxembourg)	1–5	(Republic of Ireland) Dundalk	0–2	1–3
MYPA (Finland)	1–0	(Faroe Islands) ÍF	1–0	0–0
FH (Iceland)	6–2	(Northern Ireland) Glenavon	3–0	3–2
Sillamäe Kalev (Estonia)	4–4 (a)	(Finland) Honka	2–1	2–3 (a.e.t.)
Banga (Lithuania)	0–4	(Republic of Ireland) Sligo Rovers	0–0	0–4
Víkingur Gøta (Faroe Islands)	3–2	(Latvia) Daugava Daugavpils	2–1	1–1
IFK Göteborg (Sweden)	2–0	(Luxembourg) Fola Esch	0–0	2–0
Airbus UK Broughton (Wales)	2–3	(Norway) Haugesund	1–1	1–2

=== Matches ===
3 July 2014
19:00

Sioni Bolnisi (Georgia (country))	2–3	(Albania) Flamurtari
Isiani 27', 30'	Report	Veliu 20'; Kuqi 74'; Lika 90+3'

Mikheil Meskhi Stadium, Tbilisi
Attendance: 3,253
Referee: Kristo Tohver (Estonia)
10 July 2014
19:00

Flamurtari (Albania)	1–2	(Georgia (country)) Sioni Bolnisi
Shehaj 85'	Report	Ugulava 56'; Kuqi 83' (o.g.)

Flamurtari Stadium, Vlorë
Attendance: 2,500
Referee: Clayton Pisani (Malta)

4–4 on aggregate; Flamurtari won on away goals.

3 July 2014
19:00

Tiraspol (Moldova)	2–3	(Azerbaijan) Inter Baku
Novicov 78'; Karaneychev 88'	Report	Tskhadadze 8' (pen.); E. Mammadov 10'; Novicov 71' (o.g.)

Malaya Sportivnaya Arena, Tiraspol
Attendance: 2,223
Referee: Ante Vučemilović-Šimunović Jr. (Croatia)
10 July 2014
18:00

Inter Baku (Azerbaijan)	3–1	(Moldova) Tiraspol
Dashdemirov 79'; Tskhadadze 83' (pen.); Huseynpur 90+1'	Report	Bulat 6'

Shafa Stadium, Baku
Attendance: 3,120
Referee: Marios Panayi (Cyprus)

Inter Baku won 6–3 on aggregate.

3 July 2014
20:00

Hibernians (Malta)	2–4	(Slovakia) Spartak Trnava
Cohen 49'; Failla 50'	Report	Sabo 11' (pen.), 13'; Vlasko 36'; Mikinič 88'

Ta' Qali National Stadium, Ta' Qali
Attendance: 616
Referee: Mark Whitby (Wales)
10 July 2014
19:30

Spartak Trnava (Slovakia)	5–0	(Malta) Hibernians
Mikovič 12'; Sabo 21', 90+2'; Vlasko 28'; Mikinič 85'	Report

Štadión FC ViOn, Zlaté Moravce
Attendance: 2,220
Referee: Nerijus Dunauskas (Lithuania)

Spartak Trnava won 9–2 on aggregate.

3 July 2014
20:00

Čukarički (Serbia)	4–0	(Andorra) Sant Julià
Mirosavljević 8'; Bojić 49'; S. Srnić 89'; Stojiljković 90+1' (pen.)	Report

Čukarički Stadium, Belgrade
Attendance: 2,120
Referee: Paul McLaughlin (Republic of Ireland)
10 July 2014
18:00

Sant Julià (Andorra)	0–0	(Serbia) Čukarički
	Report

Estadi Comunal, Andorra la Vella
Attendance: 150
Referee: Zaven Hovhannisyan (Armenia)

Čukarički won 4–0 on aggregate.

3 July 2014
17:30

Čelik Nikšić (Montenegro)	0–5	(Slovenia) Koper
	Report	Palčič 21'; Halilović 37'; Čovilo 49', 85'; Guberac 87'

Stadion kraj Bistrice, Nikšić
Attendance: 250
Referee: Daniel Stefański (Poland)
10 July 2014
20:30

Koper (Slovenia)	4–0	(Montenegro) Čelik Nikšić
Štromajer 10'; Galešić 16' (pen.), 90+4'; Pučko 90'	Report

Bonifika Stadium, Koper
Attendance: 700
Referee: Anatolii Zhabchenko (Ukraine)

Koper won 9–0 on aggregate.

3 July 2014
18:00

Turnovo (North Macedonia)	0–1	(Georgia (country)) Chikhura Sachkhere
	Report	Kutchukhidze 31'

Philip II Arena, Skopje
Attendance: 380
Referee: Ádám Németh (Hungary)
10 July 2014
18:00

Chikhura Sachkhere (Georgia (country))	3–1	(North Macedonia) Turnovo
Gabedava 6', 67'; Rekhviashvili 75'	Report	Pandovski 45+1'

Mikheil Meskhi Stadium, Tbilisi
Attendance: 1,500
Referee: Manuel Schüttengruber (Austria)

Chikhura Sachkhere won 4–1 on aggregate.

3 July 2014
16:00

Shirak (Armenia)	1–2	(Kazakhstan) Shakhter Karagandy
Déblé 85' (pen.)	Report	Topčagić 71'; Malyi 83'

Gyumri City Stadium, Gyumri
Attendance: 2,500
Referee: Yuriy Mozharovskyy (Ukraine)
10 July 2014
14:30

Shakhter Karagandy (Kazakhstan)	4–0	(Armenia) Shirak
Kpodo 12' (o.g.); Konysbayev 29'; Pokrivač 45+1'; Finonchenko 49'	Report

Shakhtyor Stadium, Karaganda
Attendance: 11,200
Referee: Eitan Shemeulevitch (Israel)

Shakhter Karagandy won 6–1 on aggregate.

3 July 2014
17:00

Gabala (Azerbaijan)	0–2	(Bosnia and Herzegovina) Široki Brijeg
	Report	Wagner 74', 89'

Gabala City Stadium, Gabala
Attendance: 4,200
Referee: Artyom Kuchin (Kazakhstan)
10 July 2014
20:30

Široki Brijeg (Bosnia and Herzegovina)	3–0	(Azerbaijan) Gabala
Zakarić 17'; M. Marić 29', 56'	Report

Stadion Pecara, Široki Brijeg
Attendance: 1,500
Referee: Vladimir Vnuk (Slovakia)

Široki Brijeg won 5–0 on aggregate.

3 July 2014
20:30

Diósgyőr (Hungary)	2–1	(Malta) Birkirkara
Barczi 33'; Bacsa 90+3'	Report	Bissi 35'

Nagyerdei Stadion, Debrecen
Attendance: 6,112
Referee: Ignasi Villamayor Rozados (Andorra)
10 July 2014
19:30

Birkirkara (Malta)	1–4	(Hungary) Diósgyőr
Camenzuli 44'	Report	Elek 30'; Husić 62'; Barczi 66'; Marjanović 90+1'

Ta' Qali National Stadium, Ta' Qali
Attendance: 1,200
Referee: Pavle Radovanović (Montenegro)

Diósgyőr won 6–2 on aggregate.

3 July 2014
19:00

Vaduz (Liechtenstein)	3–0	(Gibraltar) College Europa
Sutter 6'; Schürpf 8', 72'	Report

Rheinpark Stadion, Vaduz
Attendance: 1,135
Referee: Johnny Casanova (San Marino)
10 July 2014
20:00

College Europa (Gibraltar)	0–1	(Liechtenstein) Vaduz
	Report	Hasler 89'

Victoria Stadium, Gibraltar
Attendance: 824
Referee: Laurent Kopriwa (Luxembourg)

Vaduz won 4–0 on aggregate.

3 July 2014
16:30

Veris Chișinău (Moldova)	0–0	(Bulgaria) Litex Lovech
	Report

CSR Orhei, Orhei
Attendance: 1,900
Referee: Mitja Žganec (Slovenia)
11 July 2014 (Note: The Litex Lovech v Veris Chișinău match was originally to be played on 10 July 2014, 19:45 (20:45 UTC+3), at Lovech Stadium, Lovech, but was postponed to the next day and moved to Vasil Levski National Stadium, Sofia due to heavy rain.)
19:45

Litex Lovech (Bulgaria)	3–0	(Moldova) Veris Chișinău
Mendy 27'; Jordán 63', 74'	Report

Vasil Levski National Stadium, Sofia
Attendance: 1,120
Referee: Petr Ardeleanu (Czech Republic)

Litex Lovech won 3–0 on aggregate.

3 July 2014
18:00

UE Santa Coloma (Andorra)	0–3	(North Macedonia) Metalurg Skopje
	Report	Krstev 3'; Stojanovski 15'; Simonovski 83'

Estadi Comunal, Andorra la Vella
Attendance: 252
Referee: Tihomir Pejin (Croatia)
10 July 2014
20:45

Metalurg Skopje (North Macedonia)	2–0	(Andorra) UE Santa Coloma
Gjorgievski 19'; Simonovski 34'	Report

Philip II Arena, Skopje
Attendance: 480
Referee: Ville Nevalainen (Finland)

Metalurg Skopje won 5–0 on aggregate.

3 July 2014
16:00

Kairat (Kazakhstan)	1–0	(Albania) Kukësi
Darabayev 89'	Report

Almaty Central Stadium, Almaty
Attendance: 14,000
Referee: Rahim Hasanov (Azerbaijan)
10 July 2014
19:30

Kukësi (Albania)	0–0	(Kazakhstan) Kairat
	Report

Qemal Stafa Stadium, Tirana
Attendance: 2,000
Referee: Neil Doyle (Republic of Ireland)

Kairat won 1–0 on aggregate.

3 July 2014
20:30

Folgore (San Marino)	1–2	(Montenegro) Budućnost Podgorica
Perrotta 55'	Report	Raspopović 30'; Raičković 36'

Stadio Olimpico, Serravalle
Attendance: 378
Referee: Thorvaldur Árnason (Iceland)
10 July 2014
17:30

Budućnost Podgorica (Montenegro)	3–0	(San Marino) Folgore
Tomković 14'; Raičević 58'; Vujačić 72'	Report

Stadion kraj Bistrice, Nikšić
Attendance: 2,077
Referee: Tornike Gvantseladze (Georgia)

Budućnost Podgorica won 5–1 on aggregate.

3 July 2014
20:00

RNK Split (Croatia)	2–0	(Armenia) Mika
Glumac 39'; Vojnović 87'	Report

Stadion Park Mladeži, Split
Attendance: 1,500
Referee: Bart Vertenten (Belgium)
10 July 2014
16:00

Mika (Armenia)	1–1	(Croatia) RNK Split
S. Karapetyan 45+1'	Report	Bilić 88'

Mika Stadium, Yerevan
Attendance: 1,600
Referee: Oliver Drachta (Austria)

RNK Split won 3–1 on aggregate.

3 July 2014
18:45

Botev Plovdiv (Bulgaria)	4–0	(San Marino) Libertas
Ognyanov 25', 51'; Tsvetkov 58'; Pedro 72'	Report

Lazur Stadium, Burgas
Attendance: 2,400
Referee: Edin Jakupović (Bosnia and Herzegovina)
10 July 2014
20:30

Libertas (San Marino)	0–2	(Bulgaria) Botev Plovdiv
	Report	Benga 64'; Filipov 87'

Stadio Olimpico, Serravalle
Attendance: 412
Referee: Alexandru Tean (Macedonia)

Botev Plovdiv won 6–0 on aggregate.

3 July 2014
21:15

Željezničar (Bosnia and Herzegovina)	0–0	(Montenegro) Lovćen Cetinje
	Report

Asim Ferhatović Hase Stadium, Sarajevo
Attendance: 6,250
Referee: Marco Borg (Malta)
10 July 2014
17:30

Lovćen Cetinje (Montenegro)	0–1	(Bosnia and Herzegovina) Željezničar
	Report	D. Sadiković 57'

Stadion Pod Malim Brdom, Petrovac
Attendance: 1,200
Referee: Christian Dingert (Germany)

Željezničar won 1–0 on aggregate.

1 July 2014
18:00

Shkëndija (North Macedonia)	2–1	(Moldova) Zimbru Chișinău
Vručina 45+5'; Mitrov 47'	Report	Grosu 50' (pen.)

Philip II Arena, Skopje
Attendance: 2,720
Referee: Jonathan Lardot (Belgium)
10 July 2014
19:00

Zimbru Chișinău (Moldova)	2–0	(North Macedonia) Shkëndija
Amani 5'; Pașcenco 87'	Report

Zimbru Stadium, Chișinău
Attendance: 4,500
Referee: Anatoliy Vishnichenko (Kazakhstan)

Zimbru Chișinău won 3–2 on aggregate.

1 July 2014
17:45

Sliema Wanderers (Malta)	1–1	(Hungary) Ferencváros
Ohawuchi 39'	Report	Nalepa 77'

Ta' Qali National Stadium, Ta' Qali
Attendance: 525
Referee: Arnold Hunter (Northern Ireland)
10 July 2014
20:30

Ferencváros (Hungary)	2–1	(Malta) Sliema Wanderers
Ugrai 14' (pen.); Busai 56'	Report	Scozzese 60'

Ferenc Puskás Stadium, Budapest
Attendance: 4,724
Referee: Ognjen Valjić (Bosnia and Herzegovina)

Ferencváros won 3–2 on aggregate.

3 July 2014
16:00

Pyunik (Armenia)	1–4	(Kazakhstan) Astana
Papikyan 68'	Report	Nusserbayev 40'; Dzholchiev 67'; Foxi 71'; Kurdov 84'

Football Academy Stadium, Yerevan
Attendance: 1,380
Referee: Tomasz Musiał (Poland)
10 July 2014
15:00

Astana (Kazakhstan)	2–0	(Armenia) Pyunik
Dzholchiev 13'; Shomko 78'	Report

Astana Arena, Astana
Attendance: 7,200
Referee: Sergey Tsinkevich (Belarus)

Astana won 6–1 on aggregate.

3 July 2014
20:00

Rudar Velenje (Slovenia)	1–1	(Albania) Laçi
Klinar 17'	Report	Adeniyi 89'

Arena Petrol, Celje
Attendance: 1,150
Referee: George Vadachkoria (Georgia)
10 July 2014
17:00

Laçi (Albania)	1–1 (a.e.t.)	(Slovenia) Rudar Velenje
Adeniyi 58'	Report	Eterović 90+3'
Penalties
Zefi (penalty missed); Vucaj (penalty scored); Sheta (penalty scored); Teqja (penalty missed); Adeniyi (penalty scored)	3–2	(penalty missed) Eterović; (penalty missed) Knezović; (penalty missed) Rošer; (penalty scored) Kocić; (penalty scored) Klinar

Laçi Stadium, Laç
Attendance: 1,200
Referee: Tamás Bognár (Hungary)

2–2 on aggregate; Laçi won 3–2 on penalties.

3 July 2014
19:30

Differdange 03 (Luxembourg)	1–0	(Lithuania) Atlantas
Er Rafik 87'	Report

Stade Municipal de la Ville de Differdange, Differdange
Attendance: 821
Referee: Enea Jorgji (Albania)
10 July 2014
18:00

Atlantas (Lithuania)	3–1	(Luxembourg) Differdange 03
Gnedojus 10'; Papšys 62' (pen.); Maksimov 89'	Report	Caillet 81'

Central Stadium of Klaipėda, Klaipėda
Attendance: 2,000
Referee: Ken Henry Johnsen (Norway)

Atlantas won 3–2 on aggregate.

3 July 2014
18:00

VPS (Finland)	2–1	(Sweden) IF Brommapojkarna
Strandvall 53'; Parikka 54'	Report	Kouakou 33'

Tehtaan kenttä, Valkeakoski
Attendance: 1,025
Referee: Tore Hansen (Norway)
10 July 2014
19:00

IF Brommapojkarna (Sweden)	2–0	(Finland) VPS
Larsson 64'; Petrović 78'	Report

Tele2 Arena, Stockholm
Attendance: 777
Referee: Sergey Lapochkin (Russia)

IF Brommapojkarna won 3–2 on aggregate.

3 July 2014
20:00

B36 (Faroe Islands)	1–2	(Northern Ireland) Linfield
Lawal 72'	Report	Mulgrew 38'; Carvill 88'

Tórsvøllur, Tórshavn
Attendance: 786
Referee: Nikola Popov (Bulgaria)
8 July 2014
20:45

Linfield (Northern Ireland)	1–1	(Faroe Islands) B36
Carvill 17'	Report	Lawal 48' (pen.)

Mourneview Park, Lurgan
Attendance: 1,150
Referee: Thoroddur Hjaltalin (Iceland)

Linfield won 3–2 on aggregate.

3 July 2014
21:15

Fram (Iceland)	0–1	(Estonia) Nõmme Kalju
	Report	Fábio 61'

Laugardalsvöllur, Reykjavík
Attendance: 607
Referee: Jari Järvinen (Finland)
10 July 2014
18:00

Nõmme Kalju (Estonia)	2–2	(Iceland) Fram
Felipe Nunes 10'; Wakui 53'	Report	Ómarsson 25'; T. Bjarnason 64'

Kadriorg Stadium, Tallinn
Attendance: 842
Referee: Anders Poulsen (Denmark)

Nõmme Kalju won 3–2 on aggregate.

3 July 2014
19:00

Rosenborg (Norway)	4–0	(Latvia) Jelgava
Pedersen 23'; Søderlund 44', 54' (pen.); Jensen 73'	Report

Lerkendal Stadion, Trondheim
Attendance: 2,700
Referee: Adrien Jaccottet (Switzerland)
10 July 2014
18:00

Jelgava (Latvia)	0–2	(Norway) Rosenborg
	Report	Jensen 30'; Diskerud 73'

Olympic Sports Center of Zemgale, Jelgava
Attendance: 1,500
Referee: John Beaton (Scotland)

Rosenborg won 6–0 on aggregate.

3 July 2014
20:45

Derry City (Republic of Ireland)	4–0	(Wales) Aberystwyth Town
P. McEleney 15'; Patterson 25' (pen.); Timlin 47'; B. McNamee 86'	Report

Brandywell Stadium, Derry
Attendance: 1,980
Referee: Mads-Kristoffer Kristoffersen (Denmark)
10 July 2014
19:45

Aberystwyth Town (Wales)	0–5	(Republic of Ireland) Derry City
	Report	Duffy 11'; B. McNamee 14'; Patterson 60', 84', 86' (pen.)

Park Avenue, Aberystwyth
Attendance: 1,046
Referee: Jérôme Efong Nzolo (Belgium)

Derry City won 9–0 on aggregate.

3 July 2014
20:45

Aberdeen (Scotland)	5–0	(Latvia) Daugava Rīga
Logan 33'; McGinn 49'; Rooney 52' (pen.), 90+2'; Hayes 73'	Report

Pittodrie Stadium, Aberdeen
Attendance: 15,184
Referee: Nicolas Rainville (France)
10 July 2014
18:30

Daugava Rīga (Latvia)	0–3	(Scotland) Aberdeen
	Report	Rooney 22', 40', 45'

Daugava Stadium, Riga
Attendance: 600
Referee: Mikhail Vilkov (Russia)

Aberdeen won 8–0 on aggregate.

3 July 2014
17:00

Santos Tartu (Estonia)	0–7	(Norway) Tromsø
	Report	Andersen 14', 44'; J. Johansen 22'; Moldskred 24'; Drage 56'; Norbye 75'; L. Johnsen 79'

Tamme Stadium, Tartu
Attendance: 1,169
Referee: Michael Lerjéus (Sweden)
10 July 2014
19:00

Tromsø (Norway)	6–1	(Estonia) Santos Tartu
Espejord 13'; Drage 23'; Andersen 28', 57'; Wangberg 54', 79'	Report	Alve 39'

Alfheim Stadion, Tromsø
Attendance: 760
Referee: Richard Trutz (Slovakia)

Tromsø won 13–1 on aggregate.

3 July 2014
20:45

Crusaders (Northern Ireland)	3–1	(Lithuania) Ekranas
Cockcroft 23'; Owens 43'; Coates 58'	Report	Šušnjar 88'

Seaview, Belfast
Attendance: 998
Referee: Javier Estrada Fernández (Spain)
10 July 2014
17:30

Ekranas (Lithuania)	1–2	(Northern Ireland) Crusaders
Kochanauskas 60'	Report	Heatley 56', 71'

Aukštaitija Stadium, Panevėžys
Attendance: 1,400
Referee: Yaroslav Kozyk (Ukraine)

Crusaders won 5–2 on aggregate.

3 July 2014
21:15

Stjarnan (Iceland)	4–0	(Wales) Bangor City
Finsen 13' (pen.), 54'; Gunnarsson 16'; Björgvinsson 70'	Report

Stjörnuvöllur, Garðabær
Attendance: 908
Referee: Aleksandrs Anufrijevs (Latvia)
10 July 2014
19:45

Bangor City (Wales)	0–4	(Iceland) Stjarnan
	Report	Rauschenberg 53'; Björgvinsson 68', 81'; A. Jóhannsson 85'

Nantporth, Bangor
Attendance: 805
Referee: Dag Vidar Hafsås (Norway)

Stjarnan won 8–0 on aggregate.

1 July 2014
17:45

Jeunesse Esch (Luxembourg)	0–2	(Republic of Ireland) Dundalk
	Report	Towell 59' (pen.), 71'

Stade de la Frontière, Esch-sur-Alzette
Attendance: 759
Referee: Lorenc Jemini (Albania)
10 July 2014
20:45

Dundalk (Republic of Ireland)	3–1	(Luxembourg) Jeunesse Esch
Gartland 8'; Byrne 37'; Mountney 45+1'	Report	Zydko 55'

Oriel Park, Dundalk
Attendance: 2,534
Referee: Tsvetan Krastev (Bulgaria)

Dundalk won 5–1 on aggregate.

3 July 2014
17:30

MYPA (Finland)	1–0	(Faroe Islands) ÍF
Abdulahi 76'	Report

Kymenlaakson Sähkö Stadion, Kouvola
Attendance: 1,306
Referee: Sergiu Derenov (Moldova)
10 July 2014
20:00

ÍF (Faroe Islands)	0–0	(Finland) MYPA
	Report

Tórsvøllur, Tórshavn
Attendance: 228
Referee: Boško Jovanetić (Serbia)

MYPA won 1–0 on aggregate.

3 July 2014
21:15

FH (Iceland)	3–0	(Northern Ireland) Glenavon
I. Óskarsson 82'; Guðnason 90', 90+3'	Report

Kaplakriki, Hafnarfjörður
Attendance: 643
Referee: Zbynek Proske (Czech Republic)
10 July 2014
20:45

Glenavon (Northern Ireland)	2–3	(Iceland) FH
Braniff 58'; Bradley 60'	Report	I. Óskarsson 3'; Emilsson 37', 69' (pen.)

Mourneview Park, Lurgan
Attendance: 1,634
Referee: Sascha Amhof (Switzerland)

FH won 6–2 on aggregate.

3 July 2014
17:30

Sillamäe Kalev (Estonia)	2–1	(Finland) Honka
Ratnikov 32'; Kabayev 72'	Report	Kabashi 82'

Rakvere linnastaadion, Rakvere
Attendance: 425
Referee: Petur Reinert (Faroe Islands)
10 July 2014
17:30

Honka (Finland)	3–2 (a.e.t.)	(Estonia) Sillamäe Kalev
Äijälä 45'; Mombilo 90'; Porokara 105'	Report	Sidorenkov 25'; Kabayev 120'

ISS Stadion, Vantaa (Note: Honka will play their home matches at ISS Stadion, Vantaa, instead of their regular stadium, Tapiolan urheilupuisto, Espoo, which did not meet UEFA requirements.)
Attendance: 1,102
Referee: Raymond Crangle (Northern Ireland)

4–4 on aggregate; Sillamäe Kalev won on away goals.

3 July 2014
17:00

Banga (Lithuania)	0–0	(Republic of Ireland) Sligo Rovers
	Report

Gargždai Stadium, Gargždai
Attendance: 2,500
Referee: Suren Baliyan (Armenia)
10 July 2014
20:00

Sligo Rovers (Republic of Ireland)	4–0	(Lithuania) Banga
Keane 45+1'; Greene 72'; North 83'; Cawley 89'	Report

The Showgrounds, Sligo
Attendance: 2,169
Referee: Bardhyl Pashaj (Albania)

Sligo Rovers won 4–0 on aggregate.

3 July 2014
20:00

Víkingur Gøta (Faroe Islands)	2–1	(Latvia) Daugava Daugavpils
F. Justinussen 23'; A. Olsen 59'	Report	Kokins 56'

Svangaskarð, Toftir
Attendance: 342
Referee: João Capela (Portugal)
10 July 2014
17:00

Daugava Daugavpils (Latvia)	1–1	(Faroe Islands) Víkingur Gøta
Žatkins 60'	Report	A. Olsen 88'

Slokas Stadium, Jūrmala
Attendance: 200
Referee: Andreas Ekberg (Sweden)

Víkingur Gøta won 3–2 on aggregate.

3 July 2014
19:00

IFK Göteborg (Sweden)	0–0	(Luxembourg) Fola Esch
	Report

Gamla Ullevi, Gothenburg
Attendance: 5,919
Referee: Nikola Dabanović (Montenegro)
10 July 2014
19:00

Fola Esch (Luxembourg)	0–2	(Sweden) IFK Göteborg
	Report	Vibe 76'; Mahlangu 81'

Stade Josy Barthel, Luxembourg City
Attendance: 1,516
Referee: Jakob Kehlet (Denmark)

IFK Göteborg won 2–0 on aggregate.

3 July 2014
19:45

Airbus UK Broughton (Wales)	1–1	(Norway) Haugesund
Johnson 29'	Report	Bamberg 43'

Nantporth, Bangor
Attendance: 595
Referee: Antti Munukka (Finland)
10 July 2014
18:00

Haugesund (Norway)	2–1	(Wales) Airbus UK Broughton
Agdestein 7'; Sema 56'	Report	Pearson 14'

Haugesund Stadion, Haugesund
Attendance: 3,079
Referee: Fran Jović (Croatia)

Haugesund won 3–2 on aggregate.

== Second qualifying round ==
=== Summary ===
The first legs were played on 17 July, and the second legs were played on 22 and 24 July 2014.

Team 1	Agg.	Team 2	1st leg	2nd leg
Győri ETO (Hungary)	1–3	(Sweden) IFK Göteborg	0–3	1–0
Molde (Norway)	5–2	(Slovenia) Gorica	4–1	1–1
Metalurg Skopje (North Macedonia)	2–2 (a) (Note: Order of legs reversed after original draw.)	(Bosnia and Herzegovina) Željezničar	0–0	2–2
Nõmme Kalju (Estonia)	1–3	(Poland) Lech Poznań	1–0	0–3
Dinamo Minsk (Belarus)	3–0	(Finland) MYPA	3–0	0–0
Neman Grodno (Belarus)	1–3	(Iceland) FH	1–1	0–2
RNK Split (Croatia)	2–1 (Note: Order of legs reversed after original draw, due to the 2014 Israel–Gaza conflict.)	(Israel) Hapoel Be'er Sheva	2–1	0–0
Košice (Slovakia)	0–4	(Czech Republic) Slovan Liberec	0–1	0–3
Víkingur Gøta (Faroe Islands)	2–1	(Norway) Tromsø	0–0	2–1
Petrolul Ploiești (Romania)	5–1	(Albania) Flamurtari	2–0	3–1
Čukarički (Serbia)	2–5	(Austria) Grödig	0–4	2–1
CFR Cluj (Romania)	1–0	(Serbia) Jagodina	0–0	1–0
Motherwell (Scotland)	4–5	(Iceland) Stjarnan	2–2	2–3 (a.e.t.)
Zestaponi (Georgia (country))	0–3	(Slovakia) Spartak Trnava	0–0	0–3
IF Brommapojkarna (Sweden)	5–1	(Northern Ireland) Crusaders	4–0	1–1
Aberdeen (Scotland)	2–1	(Netherlands) Groningen	0–0	2–1
Bursaspor (Turkey)	0–0 (1–4 p)	(Georgia (country)) Chikhura Sachkhere	0–0	0–0 (a.e.t.)
Neftçi (Azerbaijan)	3–2	(Slovenia) Koper	1–2	2–0
Linfield (Northern Ireland)	1–2	(Sweden) AIK	1–0	0–2
Rijeka (Croatia)	3–1	(Hungary) Ferencváros	1–0	2–1
Budućnost Podgorica (Montenegro)	0–2	(Cyprus) Omonia	0–2	0–0
Mladá Boleslav (Czech Republic)	6–1	(Bosnia and Herzegovina) Široki Brijeg	2–1	4–0
Luzern (Switzerland)	2–2 (4–5 p)	(Scotland) St Johnstone	1–1	1–1 (a.e.t.)
Laçi (Albania)	1–5	(Ukraine) Zorya Luhansk	0–3	1–2
Rosenborg (Norway)	4–3	(Republic of Ireland) Sligo Rovers	1–2	3–1
Atlantas (Lithuania)	0–3	(Kazakhstan) Shakhter Karagandy	0–0	0–3
Sarajevo (Bosnia and Herzegovina)	3–2	(Norway) Haugesund	0–1	3–1
Zulte Waregem (Belgium)	5–2	(Poland) Zawisza Bydgoszcz	2–1	3–1
Sillamäe Kalev (Estonia)	0–9	(Russia) Krasnodar	0–4	0–5
CSKA Sofia (Bulgaria)	1–1 (a)	(Moldova) Zimbru Chișinău	1–1	0–0
Derry City (Republic of Ireland)	1–6	(Belarus) Shakhtyor Soligorsk	0–1	1–5
Ruch Chorzów (Poland)	3–2	(Liechtenstein) Vaduz	3–2	0–0
Astana (Kazakhstan)	3–1	(Israel) Hapoel Tel Aviv	3–0	0–1
Trenčín (Slovakia)	4–3	(Serbia) Vojvodina	4–0	0–3
Litex Lovech (Bulgaria)	2–3	(Hungary) Diósgyőr	0–2	2–1
Botev Plovdiv (Bulgaria)	2–3	(Austria) St. Pölten	2–1	0–2
RoPS (Finland)	3–5	(Greece) Asteras Tripolis	1–1	2–4
Dundalk (Republic of Ireland)	2–3	(Croatia) Hajduk Split	0–2	2–1
Kairat (Kazakhstan)	1–2	(Denmark) Esbjerg	1–1	0–1
IF Elfsborg (Sweden)	1–1 (4–3 p)	(Azerbaijan) Inter Baku	0–1	1–0 (a.e.t.)

=== Matches ===
17 July 2014
20:00

Győri ETO (Hungary)	0–3	(Sweden) IFK Göteborg
	Report	Vibe 8'; J. Johansson 56'; Mahlangu 83'

ETO Park, Győr
Attendance: 2,948
Referee: Anatoliy Abdula (Ukraine)
24 July 2014
19:00

IFK Göteborg (Sweden)	0–1	(Hungary) Győri ETO
	Report	Andrić 68'

Gamla Ullevi, Gothenburg
Attendance: 6,112
Referee: Bartosz Frankowski (Poland)

IFK Göteborg won 3–1 on aggregate.

17 July 2014
20:30

Molde (Norway)	4–1	(Slovenia) Gorica
Toivio 16'; Forren 37', 41' (pen.); Hoseth 88'	Report	Majcen 70' (pen.)

Aker Stadion, Molde
Attendance: 5,837
Referee: Padraig Sutton (Republic of Ireland)
24 July 2014
20:30

Gorica (Slovenia)	1–1	(Norway) Molde
Jogan 63'	Report	Agnaldo 49'

Nova Gorica Sports Park, Nova Gorica
Attendance: 607
Referee: Carlos Xistra (Portugal)

Molde won 5–2 on aggregate.

17 July 2014
20:30

Metalurg Skopje (North Macedonia)	0–0	(Bosnia and Herzegovina) Željezničar
	Report

Philip II Arena, Skopje
Attendance: 3,010
Referee: Eli Hacmon (Israel)
22 July 2014
21:00

Željezničar (Bosnia and Herzegovina)	2–2	(North Macedonia) Metalurg Skopje
Dodevski 16' (o.g.); Bajić 54'	Report	Radeski 62'; Krstev 90+2'

Asim Ferhatović Hase Stadium, Sarajevo
Attendance: 10,262
Referee: Mervyn Smyth (Northern Ireland)

2–2 on aggregate; Metalurg Skopje won on away goals.

17 July 2014
18:00

Nõmme Kalju (Estonia)	1–0	(Poland) Lech Poznań
Wakui 81'	Report

Kadriorg Stadium, Tallinn
Attendance: 2,280
Referee: Domagoj Vučkov (Croatia)
24 July 2014
19:00

Lech Poznań (Poland)	3–0	(Estonia) Nõmme Kalju
Kędziora 33'; Hämäläinen 43'; Kownacki 90+3'	Report

INEA Stadion, Poznań
Attendance: 20,263
Referee: Sebastian Colţescu (Romania)

Lech Poznań won 3–1 on aggregate.

17 July 2014
17:30

Dinamo Minsk (Belarus)	3–0	(Finland) MYPA
Udoji 25'; Stasevich 61' (pen.); Nikolić 86'	Report

Traktor Stadium, Minsk
Attendance: 2,600
Referee: Ivaylo Stoyanov (Bulgaria)
24 July 2014
17:30

MYPA (Finland)	0–0	(Belarus) Dinamo Minsk
	Report

Kymenlaakson Sähkö Stadion, Kouvola
Attendance: 1,060
Referee: Bryn Markham-Jones (Wales)

Dinamo Minsk won 3–0 on aggregate.

17 July 2014
19:00

Neman Grodno (Belarus)	1–1	(Iceland) FH
Savitski 66' (pen.)	Report	Emilsson 55'

Neman Stadium, Grodno
Attendance: 4,800
Referee: Bardhyl Pashaj (Albania)
24 July 2014
21:15

FH (Iceland)	2–0	(Belarus) Neman Grodno
Guðnason 42'; Björnsson 80'	Report

Kaplakriki, Hafnarfjörður
Attendance: 1,439
Referee: Nerijus Dunauskas (Lithuania)

FH won 3–1 on aggregate.

17 July 2014
20:30

RNK Split (Croatia)	2–1	(Israel) Hapoel Be'er Sheva
Dujmović 78'; Bilić 86' (pen.)	Report	Buzaglo 31'

Stadion Park Mladeži, Split
Attendance: 2,000
Referee: Ilias Spathas (Greece)
24 July 2014
15:30

Hapoel Be'er Sheva (Israel)	0–0	(Croatia) RNK Split
	Report

GSZ Stadium, Larnaca, Cyprus (Note: On 17 July 2014, the UEFA Emergency Panel decided that Israeli clubs must play their home legs outside of the country "until further notice" due to the 2014 Israel–Gaza conflict.)
Attendance: 170
Referee: João Capela (Portugal)

RNK Split won 2–1 on aggregate.

17 July 2014
17:00

Košice (Slovakia)	0–1	(Czech Republic) Slovan Liberec
	Report	Jarolím 83' (pen.)

Lokomotíva Stadium, Košice
Attendance: 7,055
Referee: Jesús Gil Manzano (Spain)
24 July 2014
19:00

Slovan Liberec (Czech Republic)	3–0	(Slovakia) Košice
Ďubek 54'; Delarge 81'; Šural 90'	Report

Stadion u Nisy, Liberec
Attendance: 7,100
Referee: Svein-Erik Edvartsen (Norway)

Slovan Liberec won 4–0 on aggregate.

17 July 2014
20:00

Víkingur Gøta (Faroe Islands)	0–0	(Norway) Tromsø
	Report

Svangaskarð, Toftir
Attendance: 447
Referee: Radu Petrescu (Romania)
24 July 2014
19:00

Tromsø (Norway)	1–2	(Faroe Islands) Víkingur Gøta
Wangberg 51'	Report	B. Hansen 60'; Hansson 77'

Alfheim Stadion, Tromsø
Attendance: 1,281
Referee: Gunnar Jarl Jónsson (Iceland)

Víkingur Gøta won 2–1 on aggregate.

17 July 2014
18:30

Petrolul Ploiești (Romania)	2–0	(Albania) Flamurtari
Nepomuceno 77'; Tamuz 84'	Report

Ilie Oană Stadium, Ploiești
Attendance: 8,714
Referee: Ken Henry Johnsen (Norway)
24 July 2014
19:00

Flamurtari (Albania)	1–3	(Romania) Petrolul Ploiești
Lena 37'	Report	Teixeira 39'; De Lucas 83'; Priso 90'

Flamurtari Stadium, Vlorë
Attendance: 3,650
Referee: Ján Valášek (Slovakia)

Petrolul Ploiești won 5–1 on aggregate.

17 July 2014
21:05

Čukarički (Serbia)	0–4	(Austria) Grödig
	Report	Nutz 37', 90'; Schütz 80', 85'

Čukarički Stadium, Belgrade
Attendance: 1,500
Referee: Sergejus Slyva (Lithuania)
24 July 2014
19:00

Grödig (Austria)	1–2	(Serbia) Čukarički
Karner 29'	Report	Bojić 61'; Stojiljković 65'

Red Bull Arena, Wals-Siezenheim
Attendance: 2,129
Referee: Orel Grinfeeld (Israel)

Grödig won 5–2 on aggregate.

17 July 2014
19:30

CFR Cluj (Romania)	0–0	(Serbia) Jagodina
	Report

Stadionul Dr. Constantin Rădulescu, Cluj-Napoca
Attendance: 5,600
Referee: Aleksei Nikolaev (Russia)
24 July 2014
20:30

Jagodina (Serbia)	0–1	(Romania) CFR Cluj
	Report	Guima 81'

Jagodina City Stadium, Jagodina
Attendance: 6,500
Referee: Bastian Dankert (Germany)

CFR Cluj won 1–0 on aggregate.

17 July 2014
20:45

Motherwell (Scotland)	2–2	(Iceland) Stjarnan
Law 9', 19'	Report	Finsen 35' (pen.), 90+2' (pen.)

Fir Park, Motherwell
Attendance: 4,877
Referee: Michael Johansen (Denmark)
24 July 2014
21:15

Stjarnan (Iceland)	3–2 (a.e.t.)	(Scotland) Motherwell
Finsen 38' (pen.); Toft 85'; A. Jóhannsson 114'	Report	Hammell 11'; Ainsworth 66'

Stjörnuvöllur, Garðabær
Attendance: 1,022
Referee: Athanasios Giachos (Greece)

Stjarnan won 5–4 on aggregate.

17 July 2014
18:00

Zestaponi (Georgia (country))	0–0	(Slovakia) Spartak Trnava
	Report

David Abashidze Stadium, Zestaponi
Attendance: 2,537
Referee: Alexandr Aliyev (Kazakhstan)
24 July 2014
19:30

Spartak Trnava (Slovakia)	3–0	(Georgia (country)) Zestaponi
Janečka 4', 43'; Sabo 60' (pen.)	Report

Štadión FC ViOn, Zlaté Moravce
Attendance: 2,940
Referee: Mete Kalkavan (Turkey)

Spartak Trnava won 3–0 on aggregate.

17 July 2014
19:00

IF Brommapojkarna (Sweden)	4–0	(Northern Ireland) Crusaders
Rexhepi 9'; Albornoz 27'; Larsson 62'; Bärkroth 65' (pen.)	Report

Tele2 Arena, Stockholm
Attendance: 524
Referee: Christos Nicolaides (Cyprus)
24 July 2014
20:45

Crusaders (Northern Ireland)	1–1	(Sweden) IF Brommapojkarna
Coates 17'	Report	Rexhepi 27'

Seaview, Belfast
Attendance: 798
Referee: Alain Bieri (Switzerland)

IF Brommapojkarna won 5–1 on aggregate.

17 July 2014
20:45

Aberdeen (Scotland)	0–0	(Netherlands) Groningen
	Report

Pittodrie Stadium, Aberdeen
Attendance: 16,523
Referee: Hugo Miguel (Portugal)
24 July 2014
19:30

Groningen (Netherlands)	1–2	(Scotland) Aberdeen
Kieftenbeld 44'	Report	Rooney 26' (pen.); McGinn 33'

Euroborg, Groningen
Attendance: 20,332
Referee: Daniel Stefański (Poland)

Aberdeen won 2–1 on aggregate.

17 July 2014
20:30

Bursaspor (Turkey)	0–0	(Georgia (country)) Chikhura Sachkhere
	Report

Bursa Atatürk Stadium, Bursa
Attendance: 17,300
Referee: Roi Reinshreiber (Israel)
24 July 2014
19:00

Chikhura Sachkhere (Georgia (country))	0–0 (a.e.t.)	(Turkey) Bursaspor
	Report
Penalties
Odikadze (penalty scored); Gabedava (penalty scored); Koripadze (penalty scored); Mumladze (penalty scored)	4–1	(penalty missed) Çinaz; (penalty missed) Civelli; (penalty scored) Tufan

Mikheil Meskhi Stadium, Tbilisi
Attendance: 13,000
Referee: Tomasz Musiał (Poland)

0–0 on aggregate; Chikhura Sachkhere won 4–1 on penalties.

17 July 2014
17:00

Neftçi (Azerbaijan)	1–2	(Slovenia) Koper
Abdullayev 45+1'	Report	Galešić 24'; Palčič 41'

Bakcell Arena, Baku
Attendance: 9,500
Referee: Denis Scherbakov (Belarus)
24 July 2014
20:30

Koper (Slovenia)	0–2	(Azerbaijan) Neftçi
	Report	Seyidov 21'; Cardoso 84'

Bonifika Stadium, Koper
Attendance: 1,800
Referee: Benoît Millot (France)

Neftçi won 3–2 on aggregate.

17 July 2014
20:45

Linfield (Northern Ireland)	1–0	(Sweden) AIK
Waterworth 87'	Report

Mourneview Park, Lurgan
Attendance: 1,741
Referee: Rene Eisner (Austria)
24 July 2014
19:00

AIK (Sweden)	2–0	(Northern Ireland) Linfield
Igboananike 55'; Goitom 72'	Report

Friends Arena, Solna
Attendance: 9,570
Referee: Fredy Fautrel (France)

AIK won 2–1 on aggregate.

17 July 2014
20:30

Rijeka (Croatia)	1–0	(Hungary) Ferencváros
Krstanović 85' (pen.)	Report

Stadion Kantrida, Rijeka
Attendance: 9,000
Referee: Tobias Stieler (Germany)
24 July 2014
20:30

Ferencváros (Hungary)	1–2	(Croatia) Rijeka
Ugrai 65' (pen.)	Report	Krstanović 20' (pen.); Samardžić 37'

Ferenc Puskás Stadium, Budapest
Attendance: 5,127
Referee: Paolo Valeri (Italy)

Rijeka won 3–1 on aggregate.

17 July 2014
17:30

Budućnost Podgorica (Montenegro)	0–2	(Cyprus) Omonia
	Report	Roberto 36'; Lobjanidze 79'

Stadion kraj Bistrice, Nikšić
Attendance: 1,000
Referee: Bart Vertenten (Belgium)
24 July 2014
18:00

Omonia (Cyprus)	0–0	(Montenegro) Budućnost Podgorica
	Report

GSP Stadium, Nicosia
Attendance: 11,661
Referee: Oliver Drachta (Austria)

Omonia won 2–0 on aggregate.

17 July 2014
19:00

Mladá Boleslav (Czech Republic)	2–1	(Bosnia and Herzegovina) Široki Brijeg
Skalák 68'; Ďuriš 76'	Report	Zakarić 51'

Městský stadion, Mladá Boleslav
Attendance: 4,127
Referee: Saïd Ennjimi (France)
24 July 2014
20:30

Široki Brijeg (Bosnia and Herzegovina)	0–4	(Czech Republic) Mladá Boleslav
	Report	Skalák 19'; Ďuriš 55', 85'; Rosa 75'

Stadion Pecara, Široki Brijeg
Attendance: 3,500
Referee: Alan Mario Sant (Malta)

Mladá Boleslav won 6–1 on aggregate.

17 July 2014
19:30

Luzern (Switzerland)	1–1	(Scotland) St Johnstone
Schneuwly 68'	Report	MacLean 47'

Swissporarena, Lucerne
Attendance: 8,902
Referee: Benoît Bastien (France)
24 July 2014
20:45

St Johnstone (Scotland)	1–1 (a.e.t.)	(Switzerland) Luzern
May 22' (pen.)	Report	Schneuwly 60'
Penalties
MacLean (penalty scored); Caddis (penalty scored); Mackay (penalty scored); May (penalty scored); Scobbie (penalty scored)	5–4	(penalty scored) Freuler; (penalty missed) Schneuwly; (penalty scored) Thiesson; (penalty scored) Wiss; (penalty scored) Winter

McDiarmid Park, Perth
Attendance: 8,486
Referee: Jonathan Lardot (Belgium)

2–2 on aggregate; St Johnstone won 5–4 on penalties.

17 July 2014
17:00

Laçi (Albania)	0–3	(Ukraine) Zorya Luhansk
	Report	Sheta 23' (o.g.); Ljubenović 47'; Boli 75'

Laçi Stadium, Laç
Attendance: 1,200
Referee: Peter Královič (Slovakia)
24 July 2014
19:30

Zorya Luhansk (Ukraine)	2–1	(Albania) Laçi
Ignjatijević 74'; Budkivskyi 87'	Report	Nimani 85'

Obolon Arena, Kyiv (Note: The second qualifying round match was played at Obolon Arena, Kyiv instead of Zorya Luhansk's home stadium, Avanhard Stadium, Luhansk, due to the war conditions in Eastern Ukraine.)
Attendance: 4,200
Referee: Stavros Tritsonis (Greece)

Zorya Luhansk won 5–1 on aggregate.

17 July 2014
19:00

Rosenborg (Norway)	1–2	(Republic of Ireland) Sligo Rovers
Rogers 81' (o.g.)	Report	Keane 56'; North 70'

Lerkendal Stadion, Trondheim
Attendance: 2,902
Referee: Michael Tykgaard (Denmark)
24 July 2014
20:00

Sligo Rovers (Republic of Ireland)	1–3	(Norway) Rosenborg
North 13'	Report	Helland 16'; Jensen 48', 64'

The Showgrounds, Sligo
Attendance: 3,792
Referee: Erik Lambrechts (Belgium)

Rosenborg won 4–3 on aggregate.

17 July 2014
18:00

Atlantas (Lithuania)	0–0	(Kazakhstan) Shakhter Karagandy
	Report

Central Stadium of Klaipėda, Klaipėda
Attendance: 3,000
Referee: Ognjen Valjić (Bosnia and Herzegovina)
24 July 2014
14:30

Shakhter Karagandy (Kazakhstan)	3–0	(Lithuania) Atlantas
Topčagić 46'; Konysbayev 61'; Murtazayev 90+3'	Report

Shakhter Stadium, Karaganda
Attendance: 12,200
Referee: Dumitru Muntean (Moldova)

Shakhter Karagandy won 3–0 on aggregate.

17 July 2014
21:00

Sarajevo (Bosnia and Herzegovina)	0–1	(Norway) Haugesund
	Report	Bamberg 85'

Asim Ferhatović Hase Stadium, Sarajevo
Attendance: 12,500
Referee: Anatolii Zhabchenko (Ukraine)
24 July 2014
18:00

Haugesund (Norway)	1–3	(Bosnia and Herzegovina) Sarajevo
Sema 47' (pen.)	Report	Stojčev 21'; Okić 36', 82'

Haugesund Stadion, Haugesund
Attendance: 3,879
Referee: Mihály Fábián (Hungary)

Sarajevo won 3–2 on aggregate.

17 July 2014
20:00

Zulte Waregem (Belgium)	2–1	(Poland) Zawisza Bydgoszcz
Colpaert 8'; Plet 45'	Report	Drygas 15'

Regenboogstadion, Waregem
Attendance: 5,843
Referee: Alejandro José Hernández (Spain)
24 July 2014
20:00

Zawisza Bydgoszcz (Poland)	1–3	(Belgium) Zulte Waregem
Petasz 52'	Report	Plet 1'; Aneke 48'; Skúlason 76'

Zdzisław Krzyszkowiak Stadium, Bydgoszcz
Attendance: 8,000
Referee: Lee Probert (England)

Zulte Waregem won 5–2 on aggregate.

17 July 2014
20:30

Sillamäe Kalev (Estonia)	0–4	(Russia) Krasnodar
	Report	Ari 9'; Gazinskiy 39'; Wánderson 68'; Bystrov 86'

A. Le Coq Arena, Tallinn
Attendance: 2,130
Referee: Bojan Pandžić (Sweden)
24 July 2014
18:00

Krasnodar (Russia)	5–0	(Estonia) Sillamäe Kalev
Joãozinho 28'; Laborde 65'; Wánderson 67', 74' (pen.); Burmistrov 76'	Report

Kuban Stadium, Krasnodar
Attendance: 12,200
Referee: Sándor Andó-Szabó (Hungary)

Krasnodar won 9–0 on aggregate.

17 July 2014
19:30

CSKA Sofia (Bulgaria)	1–1	(Moldova) Zimbru Chișinău
Karachanakov 41'	Report	Alexeev 31'

Vasil Levski National Stadium, Sofia
Attendance: 5,000
Referee: Barış Şimşek (Turkey)
24 July 2014
19:00

Zimbru Chișinău (Moldova)	0–0	(Bulgaria) CSKA Sofia
	Report

Zimbru Stadium, Chișinău
Attendance: 8,505
Referee: Marco Fritz (Germany)

1–1 on aggregate; Zimbru Chișinău won on away goals.

17 July 2014
20:45

Derry City (Republic of Ireland)	0–1	(Belarus) Shakhtyor Soligorsk
	Report	Yanush 28'

Brandywell Stadium, Derry
Attendance: 1,837
Referee: Danilo Grujić (Serbia)
24 July 2014
19:00

Shakhtyor Soligorsk (Belarus)	5–1	(Republic of Ireland) Derry City
Balanovich 9'; Guruli 28'; Asipenka 68'; Yanush 81'; Halyuza 90+3'	Report	Duffy 6'

Stroitel Stadium, Salihorsk
Attendance: 3,600
Referee: Elmir Pilav (Bosnia and Herzegovina)

Shakhtyor Soligorsk won 6–1 on aggregate.

17 July 2014
18:00

Ruch Chorzów (Poland)	3–2	(Liechtenstein) Vaduz
Zieńczuk 19'; Stawarczyk 21', 74'	Report	Muntwiler 16'; Surma 60' (o.g.)

Stadion Piast, Gliwice (Note: The matches were played at Stadion Piast, Gliwice instead of Ruch Chorzów's home stadium, Stadion Miejski, Chorzów, due to bad pitch conditions.)
Attendance: 1,000
Referee: Radek Příhoda (Czech Republic)
24 July 2014
19:00

Vaduz (Liechtenstein)	0–0	(Poland) Ruch Chorzów
	Report

Rheinpark Stadion, Vaduz
Attendance: 2,036
Referee: Anar Salmanov (Azerbaijan)

Ruch Chorzów won 3–2 on aggregate.

17 July 2014
15:00

Astana (Kazakhstan)	3–0	(Israel) Hapoel Tel Aviv
Cañas 16' (pen.); Nusserbayev 58'; Beysebekov 69'	Report

Astana Arena, Astana
Attendance: 10,800
Referee: Sergei Ivanov (Russia)
24 July 2014
19:00

Hapoel Tel Aviv (Israel)	1–0	(Kazakhstan) Astana
Sasha 57' (pen.)	Report

Antonis Papadopoulos Stadium, Larnaca, Cyprus
Attendance: 200
Referee: Rob Rogers (Republic of Ireland)

Astana won 3–1 on aggregate.

17 July 2014
17:30

Trenčín (Slovakia)	4–0	(Serbia) Vojvodina
Simon 20', 53', 60'; Jairo da Silva 72'	Report

Mestský štadión, Dubnica nad Váhom
Attendance: 3,725
Referee: Michael Lerjéus (Sweden)
24 July 2014
20:00

Vojvodina (Serbia)	3–0	(Slovakia) Trenčín
Ivanić 17'; Alivodić 52'; Stojanović 68'	Report

Karađorđe Stadium, Novi Sad
Attendance: 5,414
Referee: Mads-Kristoffer Kristoffersen (Denmark)

Trenčín won 4–3 on aggregate.

17 July 2014
19:45

Litex Lovech (Bulgaria)	0–2	(Hungary) Diósgyőr
	Report	Németh 83'; Grumić 90'

Lovech Stadium, Lovech
Attendance: 1,300
Referee: Marios Panayi (Cyprus)
24 July 2014
20:30

Diósgyőr (Hungary)	1–2	(Bulgaria) Litex Lovech
Gosztonyi 38' (pen.)	Report	Asprilla 80'; Jordán 85' (pen.)

Városi Stadion, Nyíregyháza
Attendance: 4,260
Referee: Nikolaj Hänni (Switzerland)

Diósgyőr won 3–2 on aggregate.

17 July 2014
18:45

Botev Plovdiv (Bulgaria)	2–1	(Austria) St. Pölten
Tsvetkov 39' (pen.); Chunchukov 86'	Report	Segovia 55'

Lazur Stadium, Burgas
Attendance: 2,200
Referee: Marco Guida (Italy)
24 July 2014
21:05

St. Pölten (Austria)	2–0	(Bulgaria) Botev Plovdiv
Segovia 6', 55'	Report

NV Arena, Sankt Pölten
Attendance: 4,250
Referee: Jovan Kaludjerović (Montenegro)

St. Pölten won 3–2 on aggregate.

17 July 2014
18:00

RoPS (Finland)	1–1	(Greece) Asteras Tripolis
Lahdenmäki 2'	Report	Sankaré 10'

Raatti Stadium, Oulu
Attendance: 3,424
Referee: Milenko Vukadinović (Serbia)
24 July 2014
20:00

Asteras Tripolis (Greece)	4–2	(Finland) RoPS
Kourbelis 12'; De Blasis 45+6' (pen.), 73'; Bakasetas 81'	Report	Mäkitalo 53'; Lahdenmäki 62'

Theodoros Kolokotronis Stadium, Tripoli
Attendance: 2,867
Referee: Vitali Meshkov (Russia)

Asteras Tripolis won 5–3 on aggregate.

17 July 2014
20:45

Dundalk (Republic of Ireland)	0–2	(Croatia) Hajduk Split
	Report	Caktaš 9'; Vlašić 75'

Oriel Park, Dundalk
Attendance: 3,014
Referee: Markus Hameter (Austria)
24 July 2014
20:15

Hajduk Split (Croatia)	1–2	(Republic of Ireland) Dundalk
Kouassi 25'	Report	Hoban 66'; Byrne 74'

Stadion Poljud, Split
Attendance: 15,000
Referee: Ionuț Avram (Romania)

Hajduk Split won 3–2 on aggregate.

17 July 2014
16:00

Kairat (Kazakhstan)	1–1	(Denmark) Esbjerg
Knežević 50' (pen.)	Report	Fellah 90+2'

Almaty Central Stadium, Almaty
Attendance: 19,000
Referee: Oleksandr Derdo (Ukraine)
24 July 2014
19:00

Esbjerg (Denmark)	1–0	(Kazakhstan) Kairat
Ankersen 38'	Report

Blue Water Arena, Esbjerg
Attendance: 5,522
Referee: Dennis Antamo (Finland)

Esbjerg won 2–1 on aggregate.

17 July 2014
18:00

IF Elfsborg (Sweden)	0–1	(Azerbaijan) Inter Baku
	Report	Georgievski 29'

Borås Arena, Borås
Attendance: 2,393
Referee: Davide Massa (Italy)
24 July 2014
18:00

Inter Baku (Azerbaijan)	0–1 (a.e.t.)	(Sweden) IF Elfsborg
	Report	Holmén 45+1'
Penalties
Álvaro (penalty missed); Amisulashvili (penalty scored); D. Meza (penalty scored); Špičić (penalty missed); Bocognano (penalty scored); Dashdemirov (penalty missed)	3–4	(penalty scored) Prodell; (penalty scored) Rohdén; (penalty missed) Nilsson; (penalty missed) Mobaeck; (penalty scored) Beckmann; (penalty scored) Holmén

Shafa Stadium, Baku
Attendance: 3,420
Referee: Stanislav Todorov (Bulgaria)

1–1 on aggregate; IF Elfsborg won 4–3 on penalties.
