= 2014–15 UEFA Europa League =

44th season of Europe's secondary club football tournament organised by UEFA

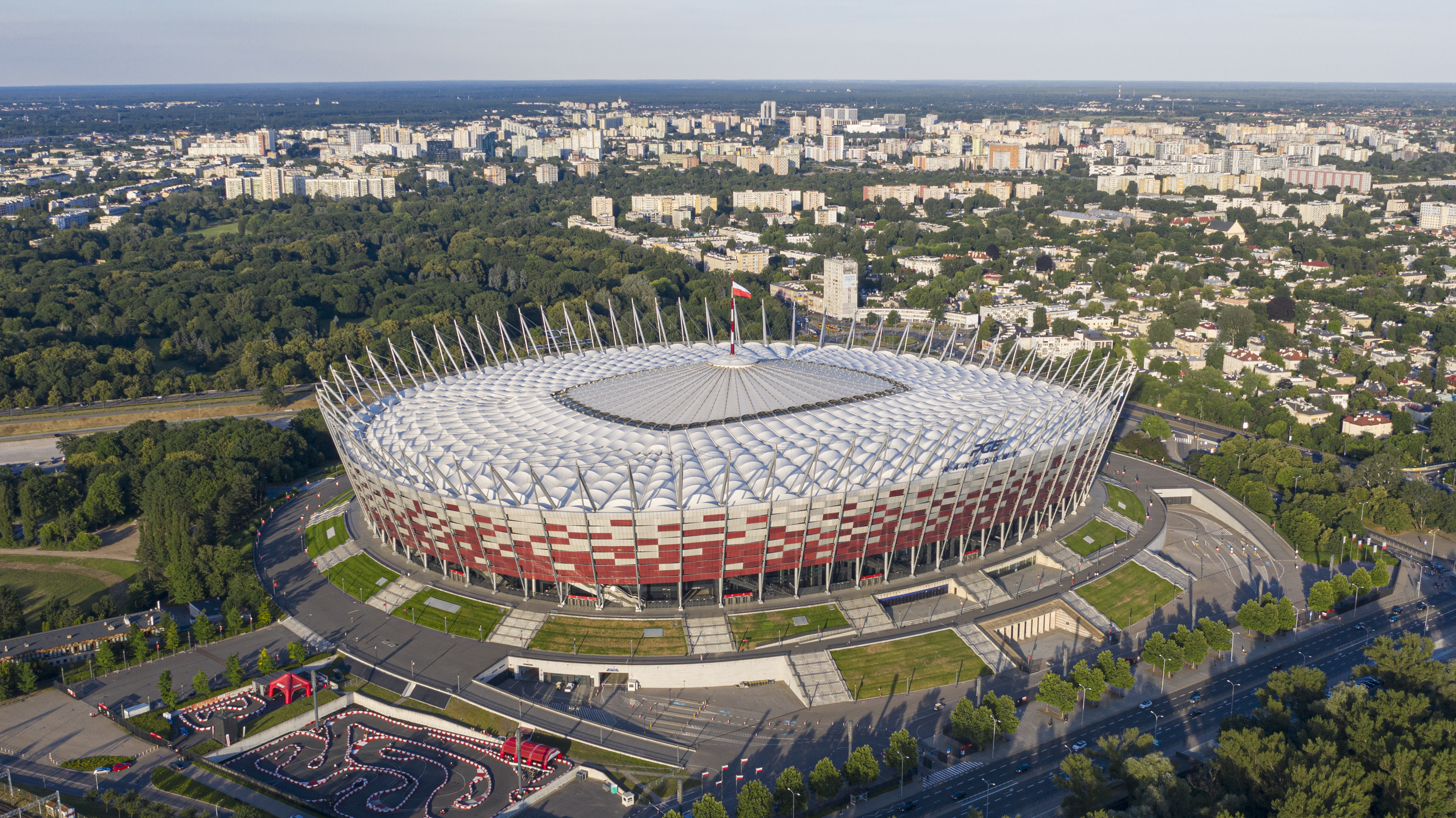
- The National Stadium in Warsaw hosted the final

Tournament details
- Dates: Qualifying: 1 July – 28 August 2014; Competition proper: 18 September 2014 – 27 May 2015
- Teams: Competition proper: 48+8; Total: 162+33 (from 54 associations)

Final positions
- Champions: (Spain) Sevilla (4th title)
- Runners-up: (Ukraine) Dnipro Dnipropetrovsk

Tournament statistics
- Matches played: 205
- Goals scored: 548 (2.67 per match)
- Attendance: 4,066,128 (19,835 per match)
- Top scorer(s): Alan (Red Bull Salzburg); Romelu Lukaku (Everton); 8 goals each

The 2014–15 UEFA Europa League was the 44th season of Europe's secondary club football tournament organised by UEFA, and the sixth season since it was renamed from the UEFA Cup to the UEFA Europa League.

The final was played at the National Stadium in Warsaw, Poland, with Spanish side and title holders Sevilla defeating Ukrainian side Dnipro Dnipropetrovsk 3–2 to win a record-breaking fourth title.

This season was the first where clubs must comply with UEFA Financial Fair Play Regulations in order to participate. Moreover, this season was the first where a club from Gibraltar competed in the tournament, after the Gibraltar Football Association was accepted as the 54th UEFA member at the UEFA Congress in May 2013. They were granted one spot in the Europa League, which was taken by College Europa, the runners-up of the 2014 Rock Cup.

Starting from this edition, the UEFA Europa League winners automatically qualify for the subsequent UEFA Champions League season even if they do not qualify for the Champions League through their domestic performance. Therefore, the winners of this tournament qualify for the 2015–16 UEFA Champions League. They are guaranteed to enter at least the play-off round, and since the group stage berth reserved for the Champions League title holders will not be used (the winners of the 2014–15 UEFA Champions League are guaranteed to qualify for the group stage through domestic performance), they will be elevated to enter the group stage via this berth.

On 17 July 2014, the UEFA emergency panel ruled that Ukrainian and Russian clubs would not be drawn against each other "until further notice" due to the political unrest between the countries. Another ruling centred in regional instability was also made where Israeli teams were prohibited from hosting any UEFA competitions due to the 2014 Israel–Gaza conflict (whilst the ruling ended a short time after the war, all the country's sides were eliminated before it ended). The rules regarding suspension due to yellow card accumulation were also changed such that all bookings expired on completion of the quarter-finals and were not carried forward to the semi-finals. Moreover, this was the first season in which vanishing spray was used.

== Association team allocation ==
A total of 195 teams from all 54 UEFA member associations participated in the 2014–15 UEFA Europa League. The association ranking based on the UEFA country coefficients was used to determine the number of participating teams for each association:

- Associations 1–6 each had three teams qualify.
- Associations 7–9 each had four teams qualify.
- Associations 10–51 (except Liechtenstein) each had three teams qualify.
- Associations 52–53 each had two teams qualify.
- Liechtenstein and Gibraltar each had one team qualify (Liechtenstein organised only a domestic cup and no domestic league; Gibraltar as per decision by the UEFA Executive Committee).
- The top three associations of the 2013–14 UEFA Respect Fair Play ranking each gained an additional berth.
- Moreover, 33 teams eliminated from the 2014–15 UEFA Champions League were transferred to the Europa League.

The winners of the 2013–14 UEFA Europa League were given an additional entry as title holders if they did not qualify for the 2014–15 UEFA Champions League or Europa League through their domestic performance. However, this additional entry was not necessary for this season since the title holders qualified for European competitions through their domestic performance.

=== Association ranking ===
For the 2014–15 UEFA Europa League, the associations were allocated places according to their 2013 UEFA country coefficients, which took into account their performance in European competitions from 2008–09 to 2012–13.

Apart from the allocation based on the country coefficients, associations could have additional teams participating in the Europa League, as noted below:

- (FP) – Additional berth via Fair Play ranking (Norway, Sweden, Finland)
- (UCL) – Additional teams transferred from the Champions League

Rank	Association	Coeff.	Teams	Notes
1	Spain	88.025	3	+1(UCL)
2	England	82.963	3	+1(UCL)
3	Germany	79.614	3	
4	Italy	64.147	3	+2(UCL)
5	Portugal	59.168	3	+1(UCL)
6	France	59.000	3	+1(UCL)
7	Ukraine	49.758	4	+1(UCL)
8	Russia	46.332	4	+1(UCL)
9	Netherlands	44.729	4	+2(UCL)
10	Turkey	34.500	3	+1(UCL)
11	Belgium	34.400	3	+2(UCL)
12	Greece	34.000	3	+2(UCL)
13	Switzerland	28.925	3	+1(UCL)
14	Cyprus	26.833	3	+1(UCL)
15	Denmark	25.700	3	+2(UCL)
16	Austria	25.375	3	+1(UCL)
17	Czech Republic	23.725	3	+1(UCL)
18	Romania	23.024	3	+1(UCL)

Rank	Association	Coeff.	Teams	Notes
19	Israel	22.875	3	+1(UCL)
20	Belarus	20.875	3	
21	Poland	20.750	3	+1(UCL)
22	Croatia	19.583	3	+1(UCL)
23	Sweden	15.625	3	+1(FP)
24	Scotland	15.191	3	+1(UCL)
25	Serbia	14.625	3	+1(UCL)
26	Slovakia	14.208	3	+1(UCL)
27	Norway	14.175	3	+1(FP)
28	Bulgaria	12.250	3	
29	Hungary	11.750	3	+1(UCL)
30	Slovenia	9.708	3	
31	Georgia	9.166	3	
32	Azerbaijan	8.541	3	+1(UCL)
33	Finland	8.508	3	+1(FP) +1(UCL)
34	Bosnia and Herzegovina	7.833	3	
35	Moldova	7.666	3	+1(UCL)
36	Republic of Ireland	7.375	3	

Rank	Association	Coeff.	Teams	Notes
37	Lithuania	6.500	3	
38	Kazakhstan	5.958	3	+1(UCL)
39	Latvia	5.791	3	
40	Iceland	5.416	3	
41	Montenegro	5.250	3	
42	Macedonia	5.250	3	
43	Albania	4.166	3	
44	Malta	3.958	3	
45	Liechtenstein	3.500	1	
46	Luxembourg	3.375	3	
47	Northern Ireland	3.083	3	
48	Wales	2.583	3	
49	Estonia	2.208	3	
50	Armenia	1.750	3	
51	Faroe Islands	1.583	3	
52	San Marino	0.666	2	
53	Andorra	0.500	2	
54	Gibraltar	0.000	1	

=== Distribution ===
Since title holders Sevilla qualified for the Europa League through their domestic performance, the spot which they qualified for in the group stage (as the fifth-placed team of the 2013–14 La Liga) is vacated, and the following changes to the default allocation system were made:

- The domestic cup winners of association 7 (Ukraine) were promoted from the play-off round to the group stage.
- The domestic cup winners of association 16 (Austria) were promoted from the third qualifying round to the play-off round.
- The domestic cup winners of association 19 (Israel) were promoted from the second qualifying round to the third qualifying round.
- The domestic cup winners of associations 33 and 34 (Finland and Bosnia and Herzegovina) were promoted from the first qualifying round to the second qualifying round.

	Teams entering in this round	Teams advancing from previous round	Teams transferred from Champions League
First qualifying round (78 teams)	20 domestic cup winners from associations 35–54; 26 domestic league runners-up from associations 27–53 (except Liechtenstein); 29 domestic league third-placed teams from associations 22–51 (except Liechtenstein); 3 teams which qualified via Fair Play ranking		
Second qualifying round (80 teams)	15 domestic cup winners from associations 20–34; 11 domestic league runners-up from associations 16–26; 6 domestic league third-placed teams from associations 16–21; 6 domestic league fourth-placed teams from associations 10–15; 3 domestic league fifth-placed teams from associations 7–9	39 winners from the first qualifying round	
Third qualifying round (58 teams)	3 domestic cup winners from associations 17–19; 6 domestic league third-placed teams from associations 10–15; 3 domestic league fourth-placed teams from associations 7–9; 3 domestic league fifth-placed teams from associations 4–6 (League Cup winners for France); 3 domestic league sixth-placed teams from associations 1–3 (League Cup winners for England)	40 winners from the second qualifying round	
Play-off round (62 teams)	9 domestic cup winners from associations 8–16; 3 domestic league third-placed teams from associations 7–9; 3 domestic league fourth-placed teams from associations 4–6; 3 domestic league fifth-placed teams from associations 1–3	29 winners from the third qualifying round	15 losers from the Champions League third qualifying round
Group stage (48 teams)	Title holders; 6 domestic cup winners from associations 2–7	31 winners from the play-off round	10 losers from the Champions League play-off round
Knockout phase (32 teams)		12 group winners from the group stage; 12 group runners-up from the group stage	8 third-placed teams from the Champions League group stage

==== Redistribution rules ====
A Europa League place was vacated when a team qualified for both the Champions League and the Europa League, or qualified for the Europa League by more than one method. When a place was vacated, it was redistributed within the national association by the following rules:

- When the domestic cup winners (considered as the "highest-placed" qualifier within the national association with the latest starting round) also qualified for the Champions League, their Europa League place was vacated. As a result, either of the following teams qualified for the Europa League:
  - The domestic cup runners-up, provided they had not yet qualified for European competitions, qualified for the Europa League as the "lowest-placed" qualifier (with the earliest starting round), with the other Europa League qualifiers moved up one "place" (the 2014–15 season was the last with this particular arrangement).
  - Otherwise, the highest-placed team in the league which had not yet qualified for European competitions qualified for the Europa League, with the Europa League qualifiers which finished above them in the league moved up one "place".
- When the domestic cup winners also qualified for the Europa League through league position, their place through the league position was vacated. As a result, the highest-placed team in the league which had not yet qualified for European competitions qualified for the Europa League, with the Europa League qualifiers which finished above them in the league moved up one "place" if possible.
- For associations where a Europa League place was reserved for the League Cup winners, they always qualified for the Europa League as the "lowest-placed" qualifier (or as the second "lowest-placed" qualifier in cases where the cup runners-up qualified as stated above). If the League Cup winners had already qualified for European competitions through other methods, this reserved Europa League place was taken by the highest-placed team in the league which had not yet qualified for European competitions.
- A Fair Play place was taken by the highest-ranked team in the domestic Fair Play table which had not yet qualified for European competitions.

=== Teams ===
The labels in the parentheses show how each team qualified for the place of its starting round:

- TH: Title holders
- CW: Cup winners
- CR: Cup runners-up
- LC: League Cup winners
- 2nd, 3rd, 4th, 5th, 6th, etc.: League position
- P-W: End-of-season European competition play-offs winners
- FP: Fair Play
- UCL: Transferred from the Champions League
  - GS: Third-placed teams from the group stage
  - PO: Losers from the play-off round
  - Q3: Losers from the third qualifying round

Round of 32
(Greece) Olympiacos (UCL GS)	(Russia) Zenit Saint Petersburg (UCL GS)	(Italy) Roma (UCL GS)	(Portugal) Sporting CP (UCL GS)
(England) Liverpool (UCL GS)	(Belgium) Anderlecht (UCL GS)	(Netherlands) Ajax (UCL GS)	(Spain) Athletic Bilbao (UCL GS)
Group stage
(Spain) Sevilla^{TH} (5th)	(France) Guingamp (CW)	(Romania) Steaua București (UCL PO)	(France) Lille (UCL PO)
(England) Everton (5th)	(Ukraine) Dynamo Kyiv (CW)	(Slovakia) Slovan Bratislava (UCL PO)	(Italy) Napoli (UCL PO)
(Germany) VfL Wolfsburg (5th)	(Scotland) Celtic (UCL PO)	(Turkey) Beşiktaş (UCL PO)	
(Italy) Fiorentina (4th)	(Austria) Red Bull Salzburg (UCL PO)	(Belgium) Standard Liège (UCL PO)	
(Portugal) Estoril (4th)	(Denmark) AaB (UCL PO)	(Denmark) Copenhagen (UCL PO)	
Play-off round
(Spain) Villarreal (6th)	(Netherlands) PEC Zwolle (CW)	(Azerbaijan) Qarabağ (UCL Q3)	(Serbia) Partizan (UCL Q3)
(England) Tottenham Hotspur (6th)	(Netherlands) Twente (3rd)	(Hungary) Debrecen (UCL Q3)	(Cyprus) AEL Limassol (UCL Q3)
(Germany) Borussia Mönchengladbach (6th)	(Turkey) Trabzonspor (4th)	(Moldova) Sheriff Tiraspol (UCL Q3)	(Ukraine) Dnipro Dnipropetrovsk (UCL Q3)
(Italy) Internazionale (5th)	(Belgium) Lokeren (CW)	(Croatia) Dinamo Zagreb (UCL Q3)	(Netherlands) Feyenoord (UCL Q3)
(Portugal) Nacional (5th)	(Greece) PAOK (3rd)	(Poland) Legia Warsaw (UCL Q3)	(Switzerland) Grasshopper (UCL Q3)
(France) Saint-Étienne (4th)	(Switzerland) Zürich (CW)	(Kazakhstan) Aktobe (UCL Q3)	(Greece) Panathinaikos (UCL Q3)
(Ukraine) Metalist Kharkiv (3rd)	(Cyprus) Apollon Limassol (3rd)	(Israel) Maccabi Tel Aviv (UCL Q3)	
(Russia) Rostov (CW)	(Denmark) Midtjylland (3rd)	(Finland) HJK (UCL Q3)	
(Russia) Lokomotiv Moscow (3rd)	(Austria) Rapid Wien (2nd)	(Czech Republic) Sparta Prague (UCL Q3)	
Third qualifying round
(Spain) Real Sociedad (7th)	(France) Lyon (5th)	(Belgium) Club Brugge (3rd)	(Czech Republic) Viktoria Plzeň (2nd)
(England) Hull City (CR)	(Ukraine) Chornomorets Odesa (5th)	(Greece) Atromitos (4th)	(Romania) Astra Giurgiu (CW)
(Germany) Mainz 05 (7th)	(Russia) Dynamo Moscow (4th)	(Switzerland) Young Boys (3rd)	(Israel) Ironi Kiryat Shmona (CW)
(Italy) Torino (7th)	(Netherlands) PSV Eindhoven (4th)	(Cyprus) Ermis Aradippou (4th)	
(Portugal) Rio Ave (CR)	(Turkey) Karabükspor (7th)	(Denmark) Brøndby (4th)	
Second qualifying round
(Ukraine) Zorya Luhansk (7th)	(Czech Republic) Mladá Boleslav (3rd)	(Poland) Ruch Chorzów (3rd)	(Norway) Molde (CW)
(Russia) Krasnodar (5th)	(Czech Republic) Slovan Liberec (4th)	(Croatia) Rijeka (CW)	(Bulgaria) CSKA Sofia (2nd)
(Netherlands) Groningen (P-W)	(Romania) Petrolul Ploiești (3rd)	(Croatia) Hajduk Split (3rd)	(Hungary) Győri ETO (2nd)
(Turkey) Bursaspor (8th)	(Romania) CFR Cluj (5th)	(Sweden) IF Elfsborg (CW)	(Slovenia) Gorica (CW)
(Belgium) Zulte Waregem (P-W)	(Israel) Hapoel Be'er Sheva (2nd)	(Sweden) AIK (2nd)	(Georgia (country)) Zestaponi (2nd)
(Greece) Asteras Tripolis (5th)	(Israel) Hapoel Tel Aviv (4th)	(Scotland) St Johnstone (CW)	(Azerbaijan) Neftçi (CW)
(Switzerland) Luzern (4th)	(Belarus) Shakhtyor Soligorsk (CW)	(Scotland) Motherwell (2nd)	(Finland) RoPS (CW)
(Cyprus) Omonia (5th)	(Belarus) Dinamo Minsk (3rd)	(Serbia) Vojvodina (CW)	(Bosnia and Herzegovina) Sarajevo (CW)
(Denmark) Esbjerg (5th)	(Belarus) Neman Grodno (4th)	(Serbia) Jagodina (3rd)	
(Austria) Grödig (3rd)	(Poland) Zawisza Bydgoszcz (CW)	(Slovakia) Košice (CW)	
(Austria) St. Pölten (CR)	(Poland) Lech Poznań (2nd)	(Slovakia) Trenčín (2nd)	
First qualifying round
(Croatia) RNK Split (4th)	(Bosnia and Herzegovina) Željezničar (4th)	(Montenegro) Čelik Nikšić (3rd)	(Wales) Aberystwyth Town (CR)
(Sweden) IFK Göteborg (3rd)	(Moldova) Zimbru Chișinău (CW)	(Montenegro) Budućnost Podgorica (4th)	(Estonia) Nõmme Kalju (2nd)
(Scotland) Aberdeen (3rd)	(Moldova) Tiraspol (2nd)	(North Macedonia) Turnovo (2nd)	(Estonia) Sillamäe Kalev (3rd)
(Serbia) Čukarički (5th)	(Moldova) Veris Chișinău (3rd)	(North Macedonia) Metalurg Skopje (3rd)	(Estonia) Santos Tartu (CR)
(Slovakia) Spartak Trnava (3rd)	(Republic of Ireland) Sligo Rovers (CW)	(North Macedonia) Shkëndija (4th)	(Armenia) Pyunik (CW)
(Norway) Rosenborg (2nd)	(Republic of Ireland) Dundalk (2nd)	(Albania) Flamurtari (CW)	(Armenia) Shirak (2nd)
(Norway) Haugesund (3rd)	(Republic of Ireland) Derry City (4th)	(Albania) Kukësi (2nd)	(Armenia) Mika (3rd)
(Bulgaria) Litex Lovech (3rd)	(Lithuania) Atlantas (2nd)	(Albania) Laçi (3rd)	(Faroe Islands) Víkingur Gøta (CW)
(Bulgaria) Botev Plovdiv (CR)	(Lithuania) Ekranas (3rd)	(Malta) Birkirkara (2nd)	(Faroe Islands) ÍF (2nd)
(Hungary) Ferencváros (3rd)	(Lithuania) Banga (CR)	(Malta) Hibernians (3rd)	(Faroe Islands) B36 (3rd)
(Hungary) Diósgyőr (CR)	(Kazakhstan) Shakhter Karagandy (CW)	(Malta) Sliema Wanderers (CR)	(San Marino) Libertas (CW)
(Slovenia) Koper (2nd)	(Kazakhstan) Astana (2nd)	(Liechtenstein) Vaduz (CW)	(San Marino) Folgore (2nd)
(Slovenia) Rudar Velenje (3rd)	(Kazakhstan) Kairat (3rd)	(Luxembourg) Differdange 03 (CW)	(Andorra) Sant Julià (CW)
(Georgia (country)) Sioni Bolnisi (3rd)	(Latvia) Jelgava (CW)	(Luxembourg) Fola Esch (2nd)	(Andorra) UE Santa Coloma (2nd)
(Georgia (country)) Chikhura Sachkhere (CR)	(Latvia) Daugava Daugavpils (3rd)	(Luxembourg) Jeunesse Esch (4th)	(Gibraltar) College Europa (CR)
(Azerbaijan) Inter Baku (2nd)	(Latvia) Daugava Rīga (4th)	(Northern Ireland) Glenavon (CW)	(Norway) Tromsø (FP)
(Azerbaijan) Gabala (3rd)	(Iceland) Fram (CW)	(Northern Ireland) Linfield (2nd)	(Sweden) IF Brommapojkarna (FP)
(Finland) Honka (2nd)	(Iceland) FH (2nd)	(Northern Ireland) Crusaders (3rd)	(Finland) MYPA (FP)
(Finland) VPS (3rd)	(Iceland) Stjarnan (3rd)	(Wales) Airbus UK Broughton (2nd)	
(Bosnia and Herzegovina) Široki Brijeg (2nd)	(Montenegro) Lovćen Cetinje (CW)	(Wales) Bangor City (P-W)	

Notably three teams took part in the competition that did not currently play in their national top-division. They were Santos Tartu (third tier), St. Pölten (second) and Tromsø (second).

Notes

1. Gibraltar (GIB): A meeting was held by the Gibraltar Football Association to decide whether College Europa (runners-up of the 2014 Rock Cup) or Manchester 62 (runners-up of the 2013–14 Gibraltar Premier Division) would represent Gibraltar in the 2014–15 UEFA Europa League. The association had to back-track on a decision taken at the beginning of the season as to who would qualify for European competitions, as they were mistaken to go against the competition rules.
2. Hungary (HUN): Újpest, the winners of the 2013–14 Magyar Kupa, would have qualified for the Europa League second qualifying round, but failed to obtain a UEFA licence. As a result, Győri ETO, the runners-up of the 2013–14 Nemzeti Bajnokság I, entered the second qualifying round instead of the first qualifying round, and the first qualifying round berth was given to Diósgyőr, the runners-up of the cup.
3. Italy (ITA): Parma, the sixth-placed team of the 2013–14 Serie A, would have qualified for the Europa League third qualifying round, but failed to obtain a UEFA licence. As a result, the berth was given to Torino, the seventh-placed team of the league.
4. Latvia (LVA): Skonto, the runners-up of the 2013 Latvian Higher League, would have qualified for the Europa League first qualifying round, but had been excluded from participating by the UEFA Club Financial Control Body due to overdue payables. As a result, the berth was given to Daugava Rīga, the fourth-placed team of the league.
5. Republic of Ireland (IRL): Derry City are a club based in Northern Ireland, but participate in the Europa League through one of the berths for Republic of Ireland as they finished fourth in the 2013 League of Ireland Premier Division (any coefficient points they earn count toward Republic of Ireland and not Northern Ireland).
6. Romania (ROU): Dinamo București, the fourth-placed team of the 2013–14 Liga I, would have qualified for the Europa League second qualifying round, but failed to obtain a UEFA licence. As a result, the berth was given to CFR Cluj, the fifth-placed team of the league.
7. Serbia (SRB): Red Star Belgrade, the champions of the 2013–14 Serbian SuperLiga, would have qualified for the Champions League second qualifying round, but was banned by UEFA for breaching UEFA Club Licensing and Financial Fair Play Regulations. As a result, Partizan, the runners-up of the league, entered the Champions League instead of the Europa League second qualifying round. Moreover, Jagodina, the third-placed team of the league, entered the Europa League second qualifying round instead of the first qualifying round, and the first qualifying round berth was given to Čukarički, the fifth-placed team of the league.
8. Turkey (TUR): Fenerbahçe, the champions of the 2013–14 Süper Lig, would have qualified for the Champions League, but was banned by UEFA because of the 2011 Turkish football match-fixing scandal. As a result, Beşiktaş, the third-placed team of the league, entered the Champions League instead of the Europe League play-off round, and Trabzonspor, the fourth-placed team of the league, entered the Europa League play-off round instead of the third qualifying round. Moreover, Sivasspor, the fifth-placed team of the league, and Eskişehirspor, the runners-up of the 2013–14 Turkish Cup, which would have entered the Europa League third qualifying round and second qualifying round respectively, were also banned by UEFA due to match-fixing. The two berths were given to Karabükspor and Bursaspor, the seventh- and eighth-placed teams of the league respectively, as Kasımpaşa, the sixth-placed team of the league, failed to obtain a UEFA licence.
9. Ukraine (UKR): Metalurh Donetsk, the sixth-placed team of the 2013–14 Ukrainian Premier League, would have qualified for the Europa League second qualifying round, but had been excluded from participating by the UEFA Club Financial Control Body due to overdue payables. As a result, the berth was given to Zorya Luhansk, the seventh-placed team of the league.

== Round and draw dates ==
The schedule of the competition was as follows (all draws were held at UEFA headquarters in Nyon, Switzerland, unless stated otherwise).

Phase	Round	Draw date	First leg	Second leg
Qualifying	First qualifying round	23 June 2014	3 July 2014	10 July 2014
Qualifying	Second qualifying round	23 June 2014	17 July 2014	24 July 2014
Qualifying	Third qualifying round	18 July 2014	31 July 2014	7 August 2014
Play-off	Play-off round	8 August 2014	21 August 2014	28 August 2014
Group stage	Matchday 1	29 August 2014 (Monaco)	18 September 2014	
Group stage	Matchday 2	29 August 2014 (Monaco)	2 October 2014	
Group stage	Matchday 3	29 August 2014 (Monaco)	23 October 2014	
Group stage	Matchday 4	29 August 2014 (Monaco)	6 November 2014	
Group stage	Matchday 5	29 August 2014 (Monaco)	27 November 2014	
Group stage	Matchday 6	29 August 2014 (Monaco)	11 December 2014	
Knockout phase	Round of 32	15 December 2014	19 February 2015	26 February 2015
Knockout phase	Round of 16	27 February 2015	12 March 2015	19 March 2015
Knockout phase	Quarter-finals	20 March 2015	16 April 2015	23 April 2015
Knockout phase	Semi-finals	24 April 2015	7 May 2015	14 May 2015
Knockout phase	Final	24 April 2015	27 May 2015 at National Stadium, Warsaw	

Matches in the qualifying, play-off, and knockout rounds may also be played on Tuesdays or Wednesdays instead of the regular Thursdays due to scheduling conflicts.

== Qualifying rounds ==
In the qualifying rounds and the play-off round, teams were divided into seeded and unseeded teams based on their 2014 UEFA club coefficients, and then drawn into two-legged home-and-away ties. Teams from the same association could not be drawn against each other.

=== First qualifying round ===
The draw for the first and second qualifying rounds was held on 23 June 2014. The first legs were played on 1 and 3 July, and the second legs were played on 8, 10 and 11 July 2014.

Team 1	Agg.	Team 2	1st leg	2nd leg
Sioni Bolnisi (Georgia (country))	4–4 (a)	(Albania) Flamurtari	2–3	2–1
Tiraspol (Moldova)	3–6	(Azerbaijan) Inter Baku	2–3	1–3
Hibernians (Malta)	2–9	(Slovakia) Spartak Trnava	2–4	0–5
Čukarički (Serbia)	4–0 (Note: Order of legs reversed after original draw.)	(Andorra) Sant Julià	4–0	0–0
Čelik Nikšić (Montenegro)	0–9	(Slovenia) Koper	0–5	0–4
Turnovo (North Macedonia)	1–4	(Georgia (country)) Chikhura Sachkhere	0–1	1–3
Shirak (Armenia)	1–6	(Kazakhstan) Shakhter Karagandy	1–2	0–4
Gabala (Azerbaijan)	0–5	(Bosnia and Herzegovina) Široki Brijeg	0–2	0–3
Diósgyőr (Hungary)	6–2	(Malta) Birkirkara	2–1	4–1
Vaduz (Liechtenstein)	4–0	(Gibraltar) College Europa	3–0	1–0
Veris Chișinău (Moldova)	0–3	(Bulgaria) Litex Lovech	0–0	0–3
UE Santa Coloma (Andorra)	0–5	(North Macedonia) Metalurg Skopje	0–3	0–2
Kairat (Kazakhstan)	1–0	(Albania) Kukësi	1–0	0–0
Folgore (San Marino)	1–5	(Montenegro) Budućnost Podgorica	1–2	0–3
RNK Split (Croatia)	3–1	(Armenia) Mika	2–0	1–1
Botev Plovdiv (Bulgaria)	6–0	(San Marino) Libertas	4–0	2–0
Željezničar (Bosnia and Herzegovina)	1–0	(Montenegro) Lovćen Cetinje	0–0	1–0
Shkëndija (North Macedonia)	2–3	(Moldova) Zimbru Chișinău	2–1	0–2
Sliema Wanderers (Malta)	2–3	(Hungary) Ferencváros	1–1	1–2
Pyunik (Armenia)	1–6	(Kazakhstan) Astana	1–4	0–2
Rudar Velenje (Slovenia)	2–2 (2–3 p)	(Albania) Laçi	1–1	1–1 (a.e.t.)
Differdange 03 (Luxembourg)	2–3	(Lithuania) Atlantas	1–0	1–3
VPS (Finland)	2–3	(Sweden) IF Brommapojkarna	2–1	0–2
B36 (Faroe Islands)	2–3	(Northern Ireland) Linfield	1–2	1–1
Fram (Iceland)	2–3	(Estonia) Nõmme Kalju	0–1	2–2
Rosenborg (Norway)	6–0	(Latvia) Jelgava	4–0	2–0
Derry City (Republic of Ireland)	9–0	(Wales) Aberystwyth Town	4–0	5–0
Aberdeen (Scotland)	8–0	(Latvia) Daugava Rīga	5–0	3–0
Santos Tartu (Estonia)	1–13	(Norway) Tromsø	0–7	1–6
Crusaders (Northern Ireland)	5–2	(Lithuania) Ekranas	3–1	2–1
Stjarnan (Iceland)	8–0	(Wales) Bangor City	4–0	4–0
Jeunesse Esch (Luxembourg)	1–5	(Republic of Ireland) Dundalk	0–2	1–3
MYPA (Finland)	1–0	(Faroe Islands) ÍF	1–0	0–0
FH (Iceland)	6–2	(Northern Ireland) Glenavon	3–0	3–2
Sillamäe Kalev (Estonia)	4–4 (a)	(Finland) Honka	2–1	2–3 (a.e.t.)
Banga (Lithuania)	0–4	(Republic of Ireland) Sligo Rovers	0–0	0–4
Víkingur Gøta (Faroe Islands)	3–2	(Latvia) Daugava Daugavpils	2–1	1–1
IFK Göteborg (Sweden)	2–0	(Luxembourg) Fola Esch	0–0	2–0
Airbus UK Broughton (Wales)	2–3	(Norway) Haugesund	1–1	1–2

=== Second qualifying round ===
The first legs were played on 17 July, and the second legs were played on 22 and 24 July 2014.

Team 1	Agg.	Team 2	1st leg	2nd leg
Győri ETO (Hungary)	1–3	(Sweden) IFK Göteborg	0–3	1–0
Molde (Norway)	5–2	(Slovenia) Gorica	4–1	1–1
Metalurg Skopje (North Macedonia)	2–2 (a) (Note: Order of legs reversed after original draw.)	(Bosnia and Herzegovina) Željezničar	0–0	2–2
Nõmme Kalju (Estonia)	1–3	(Poland) Lech Poznań	1–0	0–3
Dinamo Minsk (Belarus)	3–0	(Finland) MYPA	3–0	0–0
Neman Grodno (Belarus)	1–3	(Iceland) FH	1–1	0–2
RNK Split (Croatia)	2–1 (Note: Order of legs reversed after original draw, due to the 2014 Israel–Gaza conflict.)	(Israel) Hapoel Be'er Sheva	2–1	0–0
Košice (Slovakia)	0–4	(Czech Republic) Slovan Liberec	0–1	0–3
Víkingur Gøta (Faroe Islands)	2–1	(Norway) Tromsø	0–0	2–1
Petrolul Ploiești (Romania)	5–1	(Albania) Flamurtari	2–0	3–1
Čukarički (Serbia)	2–5	(Austria) Grödig	0–4	2–1
CFR Cluj (Romania)	1–0	(Serbia) Jagodina	0–0	1–0
Motherwell (Scotland)	4–5	(Iceland) Stjarnan	2–2	2–3 (a.e.t.)
Zestaponi (Georgia (country))	0–3	(Slovakia) Spartak Trnava	0–0	0–3
IF Brommapojkarna (Sweden)	5–1	(Northern Ireland) Crusaders	4–0	1–1
Aberdeen (Scotland)	2–1	(Netherlands) Groningen	0–0	2–1
Bursaspor (Turkey)	0–0 (1–4 p)	(Georgia (country)) Chikhura Sachkhere	0–0	0–0 (a.e.t.)
Neftçi (Azerbaijan)	3–2	(Slovenia) Koper	1–2	2–0
Linfield (Northern Ireland)	1–2	(Sweden) AIK	1–0	0–2
Rijeka (Croatia)	3–1	(Hungary) Ferencváros	1–0	2–1
Budućnost Podgorica (Montenegro)	0–2	(Cyprus) Omonia	0–2	0–0
Mladá Boleslav (Czech Republic)	6–1	(Bosnia and Herzegovina) Široki Brijeg	2–1	4–0
Luzern (Switzerland)	2–2 (4–5 p)	(Scotland) St Johnstone	1–1	1–1 (a.e.t.)
Laçi (Albania)	1–5	(Ukraine) Zorya Luhansk	0–3	1–2
Rosenborg (Norway)	4–3	(Republic of Ireland) Sligo Rovers	1–2	3–1
Atlantas (Lithuania)	0–3	(Kazakhstan) Shakhter Karagandy	0–0	0–3
Sarajevo (Bosnia and Herzegovina)	3–2	(Norway) Haugesund	0–1	3–1
Zulte Waregem (Belgium)	5–2	(Poland) Zawisza Bydgoszcz	2–1	3–1
Sillamäe Kalev (Estonia)	0–9	(Russia) Krasnodar	0–4	0–5
CSKA Sofia (Bulgaria)	1–1 (a)	(Moldova) Zimbru Chișinău	1–1	0–0
Derry City (Republic of Ireland)	1–6	(Belarus) Shakhtyor Soligorsk	0–1	1–5
Ruch Chorzów (Poland)	3–2	(Liechtenstein) Vaduz	3–2	0–0
Astana (Kazakhstan)	3–1	(Israel) Hapoel Tel Aviv	3–0	0–1
Trenčín (Slovakia)	4–3	(Serbia) Vojvodina	4–0	0–3
Litex Lovech (Bulgaria)	2–3	(Hungary) Diósgyőr	0–2	2–1
Botev Plovdiv (Bulgaria)	2–3	(Austria) St. Pölten	2–1	0–2
RoPS (Finland)	3–5	(Greece) Asteras Tripolis	1–1	2–4
Dundalk (Republic of Ireland)	2–3	(Croatia) Hajduk Split	0–2	2–1
Kairat (Kazakhstan)	1–2	(Denmark) Esbjerg	1–1	0–1
IF Elfsborg (Sweden)	1–1 (4–3 p)	(Azerbaijan) Inter Baku	0–1	1–0 (a.e.t.)

=== Third qualifying round ===
The draw for the third qualifying round was held on 18 July 2014. The first legs were played on 31 July, and the second legs were played on 7 August 2014.

Team 1	Agg.	Team 2	1st leg	2nd leg
Karabükspor (Turkey)	1–1 (a)	(Norway) Rosenborg	0–0	1–1
RNK Split (Croatia)	2–0 (Note: Order of legs reversed after original draw.)	(Ukraine) Chornomorets Odesa	2–0	0–0
St Johnstone (Scotland)	2–3	(Slovakia) Spartak Trnava	1–2	1–1
Mainz 05 (Germany)	2–3	(Greece) Asteras Tripolis	1–0	1–3
Diósgyőr (Hungary)	1–8	(Russia) Krasnodar	1–5	0–3
Mladá Boleslav (Czech Republic)	2–6	(France) Lyon	1–4	1–2
Trenčín (Slovakia)	1–2	(England) Hull City	0–0	1–2
Omonia (Cyprus)	4–0	(North Macedonia) Metalurg Skopje	3–0	1–0
IF Brommapojkarna (Sweden)	0–7	(Italy) Torino	0–3	0–4
PSV Eindhoven (Netherlands)	4–2	(Austria) St. Pölten	1–0	3–2
Stjarnan (Iceland)	1–0	(Poland) Lech Poznań	1–0	0–0
Zorya Luhansk (Ukraine)	3–2	(Norway) Molde	1–1	2–1
Sarajevo (Bosnia and Herzegovina)	4–3	(Greece) Atromitos	1–2	3–1 (a.e.t.)
Real Sociedad (Spain)	5–2	(Scotland) Aberdeen	2–0	3–2
Astana (Kazakhstan)	4–1	(Sweden) AIK	1–1	3–0
Zulte Waregem (Belgium)	4–7	(Belarus) Shakhtyor Soligorsk	2–5	2–2
Grödig (Austria)	2–2 (a)	(Moldova) Zimbru Chișinău	1–2	1–0
Astra Giurgiu (Romania)	6–2	(Czech Republic) Slovan Liberec	3–0	3–2
Ruch Chorzów (Poland)	2–2 (a)	(Denmark) Esbjerg	0–0	2–2
Dynamo Moscow (Russia)	3–2	(Israel) Ironi Kiryat Shmona	1–1	2–1
Young Boys (Switzerland)	3–0	(Cyprus) Ermis Aradippou	1–0	2–0
IF Elfsborg (Sweden)	5–3	(Iceland) FH	4–1	1–2
Petrolul Ploiești (Romania)	5–2	(Czech Republic) Viktoria Plzeň	1–1	4–1
Víkingur Gøta (Faroe Islands)	1–9	(Croatia) Rijeka	1–5	0–4
Dinamo Minsk (Belarus)	3–0	(Romania) CFR Cluj	1–0	2–0
Neftçi (Azerbaijan)	3–2	(Georgia (country)) Chikhura Sachkhere	0–0	3–2
IFK Göteborg (Sweden)	0–1	(Portugal) Rio Ave	0–1	0–0
Club Brugge (Belgium)	5–0	(Denmark) Brøndby	3–0	2–0
Shakhter Karagandy (Kazakhstan)	4–5	(Croatia) Hajduk Split	4–2	0–3

== Play-off round ==
The draw for the play-off round was held on 8 August 2014. The first legs were played on 20 and 21 August, and the second legs were played on 28 August 2014.

Team 1	Agg.	Team 2	1st leg	2nd leg
Sarajevo (Bosnia and Herzegovina)	2–10	(Germany) Borussia Mönchengladbach	2–3	0–7
Apollon Limassol (Cyprus)	5–2	(Russia) Lokomotiv Moscow	1–1	4–1
Astana (Kazakhstan)	0–7	(Spain) Villarreal	0–3	0–4
Young Boys (Switzerland)	3–1	(Hungary) Debrecen	3–1	0–0
PEC Zwolle (Netherlands)	2–4	(Czech Republic) Sparta Prague	1–1	1–3
Spartak Trnava (Slovakia)	2–4	(Switzerland) Zürich	1–3	1–1
Asteras Tripolis (Greece)	3–3 (a)	(Israel) Maccabi Tel Aviv	2–0	1–3
AEL Limassol (Cyprus)	1–5	(England) Tottenham Hotspur	1–2	0–3
Dnipro Dnipropetrovsk (Ukraine)	2–1	(Croatia) Hajduk Split	2–1	0–0
Dinamo Minsk (Belarus)	5–2	(Portugal) Nacional	2–0	3–2
Qarabağ (Azerbaijan)	1–1 (a)	(Netherlands) Twente	0–0	1–1
Petrolul Ploiești (Romania)	2–5	(Croatia) Dinamo Zagreb	1–3	1–2
HJK (Finland)	5–4	(Austria) Rapid Wien	2–1	3–3
Trabzonspor (Turkey)	2–0	(Russia) Rostov	2–0	0–0
Zimbru Chișinău (Moldova)	1–4	(Greece) PAOK	1–0	0–4
RNK Split (Croatia)	0–1	(Italy) Torino	0–0	0–1
Dynamo Moscow (Russia)	4–3 (Note: Order of legs reversed after original draw.)	(Cyprus) Omonia	2–2	2–1
Aktobe (Kazakhstan)	0–3	(Poland) Legia Warsaw	0–1	0–2
Lyon (France)	2–2 (a)	(Romania) Astra Giurgiu	1–2	1–0
Lokeren (Belgium)	2–2 (a)	(England) Hull City	1–0	1–2
Partizan (Serbia)	5–3	(Azerbaijan) Neftçi	3–2	2–1
Ruch Chorzów (Poland)	0–1	(Ukraine) Metalist Kharkiv	0–0	0–1 (a.e.t.)
IF Elfsborg (Sweden)	2–2 (a)	(Portugal) Rio Ave	2–1	0–1
PSV Eindhoven (Netherlands)	3–0	(Belarus) Shakhtyor Soligorsk	1–0	2–0
Karabükspor (Turkey)	1–1 (3–4 p)	(France) Saint-Étienne	1–0	0–1 (a.e.t.)
Stjarnan (Iceland)	0–9	(Italy) Internazionale	0–3	0–6
Panathinaikos (Greece)	6–2	(Denmark) Midtjylland	4–1	2–1
Zorya Luhansk (Ukraine)	4–5	(Netherlands) Feyenoord	1–1	3–4
Grasshopper (Switzerland)	1–3	(Belgium) Club Brugge	1–2	0–1
Real Sociedad (Spain)	1–3	(Russia) Krasnodar	1–0	0–3
Rijeka (Croatia)	4–0	(Moldova) Sheriff Tiraspol	1–0	3–0

== Group stage ==
Teams that have qualified for the group stage of the 2014–15 UEFA Europa League
Red: Group A; Yellow: Group B; Green: Group C; Dark green: Group D;
Purple: Group E; Pink: Group F; Blue: Group G; Orange: Group H;
Brown: Group I; Deep pink: Group J; Cyan: Group K; Spring green: Group L.

The draw for the group stage was held in Monaco on 29 August 2014. The 48 teams were allocated into four pots based on their 2014 UEFA club coefficients, with the title holders being placed in Pot 1 automatically. They were drawn into twelve groups of four, with the restriction that teams from the same association could not be drawn against each other.

In each group, teams played against each other home-and-away in a round-robin format. The matchdays were 18 September, 2 October, 23 October (one home match of Metalist Kharkiv played on 22 October), 6 November, 27 November, and 11 December 2014.

A total of 26 national associations were represented in the group stage. VfL Wolfsburg, Torino, Feyenoord, Guingamp, Saint-Étienne, Rio Ave, Dynamo Moscow, Krasnodar, Lokeren, Asteras Tripolis, Qarabağ, HJK, Astra Giurgiu, Dinamo Minsk and AaB made their debut appearances in the UEFA Europa League group stage (not counting UEFA Cup group stage appearances), although VfL Wolfsburg had already competed in the 2009–10 UEFA Europa League knockout phase after a third place in the 2009–10 UEFA Champions League group stage.

The group winners and runners-up advanced to the round of 32, where they were joined by the eight third-placed teams of the 2014–15 UEFA Champions League group stage. See 2014–15 UEFA Europa League group stage#Tiebreakers for tiebreakers if two or more teams are equal on points.

Red Bull Salzburg's 21 goals scored set a new Europa League group stage record.

=== Group A ===
Pos	Team	Pld	W	D	L	GF	GA	GD	Pts	Qualification	MGB	VIL	ZUR	APL
1	(Germany) Borussia Mönchengladbach	6	3	3	0	14	4	+10	12	Advance to knockout phase	—	1–1	3–0	5–0
2	(Spain) Villarreal	6	3	2	1	15	7	+8	11	Advance to knockout phase	2–2	—	4–1	4–0
3	(Switzerland) Zürich	6	2	1	3	10	14	−4	7		1–1	3–2	—	3–1
4	(Cyprus) Apollon Limassol	6	1	0	5	4	18	−14	3		0–2	0–2	3–2	—

Source: Soccerway

=== Group B ===
Pos	Team	Pld	W	D	L	GF	GA	GD	Pts	Qualification	BRU	TOR	HJK	KOB
1	(Belgium) Club Brugge	6	3	3	0	10	2	+8	12	Advance to knockout phase	—	0–0	2–1	1–1
2	(Italy) Torino	6	3	2	1	9	3	+6	11	Advance to knockout phase	0–0	—	2–0	1–0
3	(Finland) HJK	6	2	0	4	5	11	−6	6		0–3	2–1	—	2–1
4	(Denmark) Copenhagen	6	1	1	4	5	13	−8	4		0–4	1–5	2–0	—

Source: Soccerway

=== Group C ===
Pos	Team	Pld	W	D	L	GF	GA	GD	Pts	Qualification	BES	TOT	AT	PAR
1	(Turkey) Beşiktaş	6	3	3	0	11	5	+6	12	Advance to knockout phase	—	1–0	1–1	2–1
2	(England) Tottenham Hotspur	6	3	2	1	9	4	+5	11	Advance to knockout phase	1–1	—	5–1	1–0
3	(Greece) Asteras Tripolis	6	1	3	2	7	10	−3	6		2–2	1–2	—	2–0
4	(Serbia) Partizan	6	0	2	4	1	9	−8	2		0–4	0–0	0–0	—

Source: Soccerway

=== Group D ===
Pos	Team	Pld	W	D	L	GF	GA	GD	Pts	Qualification	SAL	CEL	DZG	AG
1	(Austria) Red Bull Salzburg	6	5	1	0	21	8	+13	16	Advance to knockout phase	—	2–2	4–2	5–1
2	(Scotland) Celtic	6	2	2	2	10	11	−1	8	Advance to knockout phase	1–3	—	1–0	2–1
3	(Croatia) Dinamo Zagreb	6	2	0	4	12	15	−3	6		1–5	4–3	—	5–1
4	(Romania) Astra Giurgiu	6	1	1	4	6	15	−9	4		1–2	1–1	1–0	—

Source: Soccerway

=== Group E ===
Pos	Team	Pld	W	D	L	GF	GA	GD	Pts	Qualification	DYM	PSV	EST	PAN
1	(Russia) Dynamo Moscow	6	6	0	0	9	3	+6	18	Advance to knockout phase	—	1–0	1–0	2–1
2	(Netherlands) PSV Eindhoven	6	2	2	2	8	8	0	8	Advance to knockout phase	0–1	—	1–0	1–1
3	(Portugal) Estoril	6	1	2	3	7	8	−1	5		1–2	3–3	—	2–0
4	(Greece) Panathinaikos	6	0	2	4	6	11	−5	2		1–2	2–3	1–1	—

Source: Soccerway

=== Group F ===
Pos	Team	Pld	W	D	L	GF	GA	GD	Pts	Qualification	INT	DNI	QAR	SET
1	(Italy) Internazionale	6	3	3	0	6	2	+4	12	Advance to knockout phase	—	2–1	2–0	0–0
2	(Ukraine) Dnipro Dnipropetrovsk	6	2	1	3	4	5	−1	7	Advance to knockout phase	0–1	—	0–1	1–0
3	(Azerbaijan) Qarabağ	6	1	3	2	3	5	−2	6		0–0	1–2	—	0–0
4	(France) Saint-Étienne	6	0	5	1	2	3	−1	5		1–1	0–0	1–1	—

Source: Soccerway

=== Group G ===
Pos	Team	Pld	W	D	L	GF	GA	GD	Pts	Qualification	FEY	SEV	RIJ	STA
1	(Netherlands) Feyenoord	6	4	0	2	10	6	+4	12	Advance to knockout phase	—	2–0	2–0	2–1
2	(Spain) Sevilla	6	3	2	1	8	5	+3	11	Advance to knockout phase	2–0	—	1–0	3–1
3	(Croatia) Rijeka	6	2	1	3	7	8	−1	7		3–1	2–2	—	2–0
4	(Belgium) Standard Liège	6	1	1	4	4	10	−6	4		0–3	0–0	2–0	—

Source: Soccerway

=== Group H ===
Pos	Team	Pld	W	D	L	GF	GA	GD	Pts	Qualification	EVE	WOL	KRA	LIL
1	(England) Everton	6	3	2	1	10	3	+7	11	Advance to knockout phase	—	4–1	0–1	3–0
2	(Germany) VfL Wolfsburg	6	3	1	2	14	10	+4	10	Advance to knockout phase	0–2	—	5–1	1–1
3	(Russia) Krasnodar	6	1	3	2	7	12	−5	6		1–1	2–4	—	1–1
4	(France) Lille	6	0	4	2	3	9	−6	4		0–0	0–3	1–1	—

Source: Soccerway

=== Group I ===
Pos	Team	Pld	W	D	L	GF	GA	GD	Pts	Qualification	NAP	YB	SPA	SLO
1	(Italy) Napoli	6	4	1	1	11	3	+8	13	Advance to knockout phase	—	3–0	3–1	3–0
2	(Switzerland) Young Boys	6	4	0	2	13	7	+6	12	Advance to knockout phase	2–0	—	2–0	5–0
3	(Czech Republic) Sparta Prague	6	3	1	2	11	6	+5	10		0–0	3–1	—	4–0
4	(Slovakia) Slovan Bratislava	6	0	0	6	1	20	−19	0		0–2	1–3	0–3	—

Source: Soccerway

=== Group J ===
Pos	Team	Pld	W	D	L	GF	GA	GD	Pts	Qualification	DYK	AAB	STE	RIO
1	(Ukraine) Dynamo Kyiv	6	5	0	1	12	4	+8	15	Advance to knockout phase	—	2–0	3–1	2–0
2	(Denmark) AaB	6	3	0	3	5	10	−5	9	Advance to knockout phase	3–0	—	1–0	1–0
3	(Romania) Steaua București	6	2	1	3	11	9	+2	7		0–2	6–0	—	2–1
4	(Portugal) Rio Ave	6	1	1	4	5	10	−5	4		0–3	2–0	2–2	—

Source: Soccerway

=== Group K ===
Pos	Team	Pld	W	D	L	GF	GA	GD	Pts	Qualification	FIO	GUI	PAO	DMI
1	(Italy) Fiorentina	6	4	1	1	11	4	+7	13	Advance to knockout phase	—	3–0	1–1	1–2
2	(France) Guingamp	6	3	1	2	7	6	+1	10	Advance to knockout phase	1–2	—	2–0	2–0
3	(Greece) PAOK	6	2	1	3	10	7	+3	7		0–1	1–2	—	6–1
4	(Belarus) Dinamo Minsk	6	1	1	4	3	14	−11	4		0–3	0–0	0–2	—

Source: Soccerway

=== Group L ===
Pos	Team	Pld	W	D	L	GF	GA	GD	Pts	Qualification	LEG	TRA	LOK	MET
1	(Poland) Legia Warsaw	6	5	0	1	7	2	+5	15	Advance to knockout phase	—	2–0	1–0	2–1
2	(Turkey) Trabzonspor	6	3	1	2	8	6	+2	10	Advance to knockout phase	0–1	—	2–0	3–1
3	(Belgium) Lokeren	6	3	1	2	4	4	0	10		1–0	1–1	—	1–0
4	(Ukraine) Metalist Kharkiv	6	0	0	6	3	10	−7	0		0–1	1–2	0–1	—

Source: Soccerway

== Knockout phase ==
In the knockout phase, teams played against each other over two legs on a home-and-away basis, except for the one-match final. The mechanism of the draws for each round was as follows:

- In the draw for the round of 32, the twelve group winners and the four third-placed teams from the Champions League group stage with the better group records were seeded, and the twelve group runners-up and the other four third-placed teams from the Champions League group stage were unseeded. The seeded teams were drawn against the unseeded teams, with the seeded teams hosting the second leg. Teams from the same group or the same association could not be drawn against each other.
- In the draws for the round of 16 onwards, there were no seedings, and teams from the same group or the same association could be drawn against each other.

=== Bracket ===
Round of 32
(Germany) VfL Wolfsburg	2	0	2
(Portugal) Sporting CP	0	0	0
(Scotland) Celtic	3	0	3
(Italy) Internazionale	3	1	4
(Turkey) Trabzonspor	0	0	0
(Italy) Napoli	4	1	5
(Belgium) Anderlecht	0	1	1
(Russia) Dynamo Moscow	0	3	3
(Denmark) AaB	1	0	1
(Belgium) Club Brugge	3	3	6
(England) Liverpool	1	0	1 (4)
(Turkey) Beşiktaş (p)	0	1	1 (5)
(Ukraine) Dnipro Dnipropetrovsk	2	2	4
(Greece) Olympiacos	0	2	2
(Netherlands) Ajax	1	3	4
(Poland) Legia Warsaw	0	0	0
(Spain) Villarreal	2	3	5
(Austria) Red Bull Salzburg	1	1	2
(Spain) Sevilla	1	3	4
(Germany) Borussia Mönchengladbach	0	2	2
(Netherlands) PSV Eindhoven	0	0	0
(Russia) Zenit Saint Petersburg	1	3	4
(Italy) Torino	2	3	5
(Spain) Athletic Bilbao	2	2	4
(Switzerland) Young Boys	1	1	2
(England) Everton	4	3	7
(France) Guingamp	2	1	3
(Ukraine) Dynamo Kyiv	1	3	4
(England) Tottenham Hotspur	1	0	1
(Italy) Fiorentina	1	2	3
(Italy) Roma	1	2	3
(Netherlands) Feyenoord	1	1	2

Round of 16
(Germany) VfL Wolfsburg	3	2	5
(Italy) Internazionale	1	1	2
(Italy) Napoli	3	0	3
(Russia) Dynamo Moscow	1	0	1
(Belgium) Club Brugge	2	3	5
(Turkey) Beşiktaş	1	1	2
(Ukraine) Dnipro Dnipropetrovsk (a.e.t.; a)	1	1	2
(Netherlands) Ajax	0	2	2
(Spain) Villarreal	1	1	2
(Spain) Sevilla	3	2	5
(Russia) Zenit Saint Petersburg	2	0	2
(Italy) Torino	0	1	1
(England) Everton	2	2	4
(Ukraine) Dynamo Kyiv	1	5	6
(Italy) Fiorentina	1	3	4
(Italy) Roma	1	0	1

Quarter-finals
(Germany) VfL Wolfsburg	1	2	3
(Italy) Napoli	4	2	6
(Belgium) Club Brugge	0	0	0
(Ukraine) Dnipro Dnipropetrovsk	0	1	1
(Spain) Sevilla	2	2	4
(Russia) Zenit Saint Petersburg	1	2	3
(Ukraine) Dynamo Kyiv	1	0	1
(Italy) Fiorentina	1	2	3

Semi-finals
(Italy) Napoli	1	0	1
(Ukraine) Dnipro Dnipropetrovsk	1	1	2
(Spain) Sevilla	3	2	5
(Italy) Fiorentina	0	0	0

Final
27 May – Warsaw
(Ukraine) Dnipro Dnipropetrovsk	2
(Spain) Sevilla	3

=== Round of 32 ===
The draw was held on 15 December 2014. The first legs were played on 19 February, and the second legs were played on 26 February 2015.

Team 1	Agg.	Team 2	1st leg	2nd leg
Young Boys (Switzerland)	2–7	(England) Everton	1–4	1–3
Torino (Italy)	5–4	(Spain) Athletic Bilbao	2–2	3–2
Sevilla (Spain)	4–2	(Germany) Borussia Mönchengladbach	1–0	3–2
VfL Wolfsburg (Germany)	2–0	(Portugal) Sporting CP	2–0	0–0
Ajax (Netherlands)	4–0	(Poland) Legia Warsaw	1–0	3–0
AaB (Denmark)	1–6	(Belgium) Club Brugge	1–3	0–3
Anderlecht (Belgium)	1–3	(Russia) Dynamo Moscow	0–0	1–3
Dnipro Dnipropetrovsk (Ukraine)	4–2	(Greece) Olympiacos	2–0	2–2
Trabzonspor (Turkey)	0–5	(Italy) Napoli	0–4	0–1
Guingamp (France)	3–4	(Ukraine) Dynamo Kyiv	2–1	1–3
Villarreal (Spain)	5–2	(Austria) Red Bull Salzburg	2–1	3–1
Roma (Italy)	3–2	(Netherlands) Feyenoord	1–1	2–1
PSV Eindhoven (Netherlands)	0–4	(Russia) Zenit Saint Petersburg	0–1	0–3
Liverpool (England)	1–1 (4–5 p)	(Turkey) Beşiktaş	1–0	0–1 (a.e.t.)
Tottenham Hotspur (England)	1–3	(Italy) Fiorentina	1–1	0–2
Celtic (Scotland)	3–4	(Italy) Internazionale	3–3	0–1

=== Round of 16 ===
The draw was held on 27 February 2015. The first legs were played on 12 March, and the second legs were played on 19 March 2015.

Team 1	Agg.	Team 2	1st leg	2nd leg
Everton (England)	4–6	(Ukraine) Dynamo Kyiv	2–1	2–5
Dnipro Dnipropetrovsk (Ukraine)	2–2 (a)	(Netherlands) Ajax	1–0	1–2 (a.e.t.)
Zenit Saint Petersburg (Russia)	2–1	(Italy) Torino	2–0	0–1
VfL Wolfsburg (Germany)	5–2	(Italy) Internazionale	3–1	2–1
Villarreal (Spain)	2–5	(Spain) Sevilla	1–3	1–2
Napoli (Italy)	3–1	(Russia) Dynamo Moscow	3–1	0–0
Club Brugge (Belgium)	5–2	(Turkey) Beşiktaş	2–1	3–1
Fiorentina (Italy)	4–1	(Italy) Roma	1–1	3–0

=== Quarter-finals ===
The draw was held on 20 March 2015. The first legs were played on 16 April, and the second legs were played on 23 April 2015.

Team 1	Agg.	Team 2	1st leg	2nd leg
Sevilla (Spain)	4–3	(Russia) Zenit Saint Petersburg	2–1	2–2
Club Brugge (Belgium)	0–1 (Note: Order of legs reversed after original draw.)	(Ukraine) Dnipro Dnipropetrovsk	0–0	0–1
Dynamo Kyiv (Ukraine)	1–3	(Italy) Fiorentina	1–1	0–2
VfL Wolfsburg (Germany)	3–6	(Italy) Napoli	1–4	2–2

=== Semi-finals ===
The draw was held on 24 April 2015. The first legs were played on 7 May, and the second legs were played on 14 May 2015.

Team 1	Agg.	Team 2	1st leg	2nd leg
Napoli (Italy)	1–2	(Ukraine) Dnipro Dnipropetrovsk	1–1	0–1
Sevilla (Spain)	5–0	(Italy) Fiorentina	3–0	2–0

=== Final ===
The final was played on 27 May 2015 at the National Stadium in Warsaw, Poland. A draw was held on 24 April 2015, after the semi-final draw, to determine the "home" team for administrative purposes.

27 May 2015
20:45 UTC+2

Dnipro Dnipropetrovsk (Ukraine)	2–3	(Spain) Sevilla
Kalinić 7'; Rotan 44'	Report	Krychowiak 28'; Bacca 31', 73'

National Stadium, Warsaw
Attendance: 45,000
Referee: Martin Atkinson (England)

== Statistics ==
Statistics exclude qualifying rounds and play-off round.

=== Top goalscorers ===
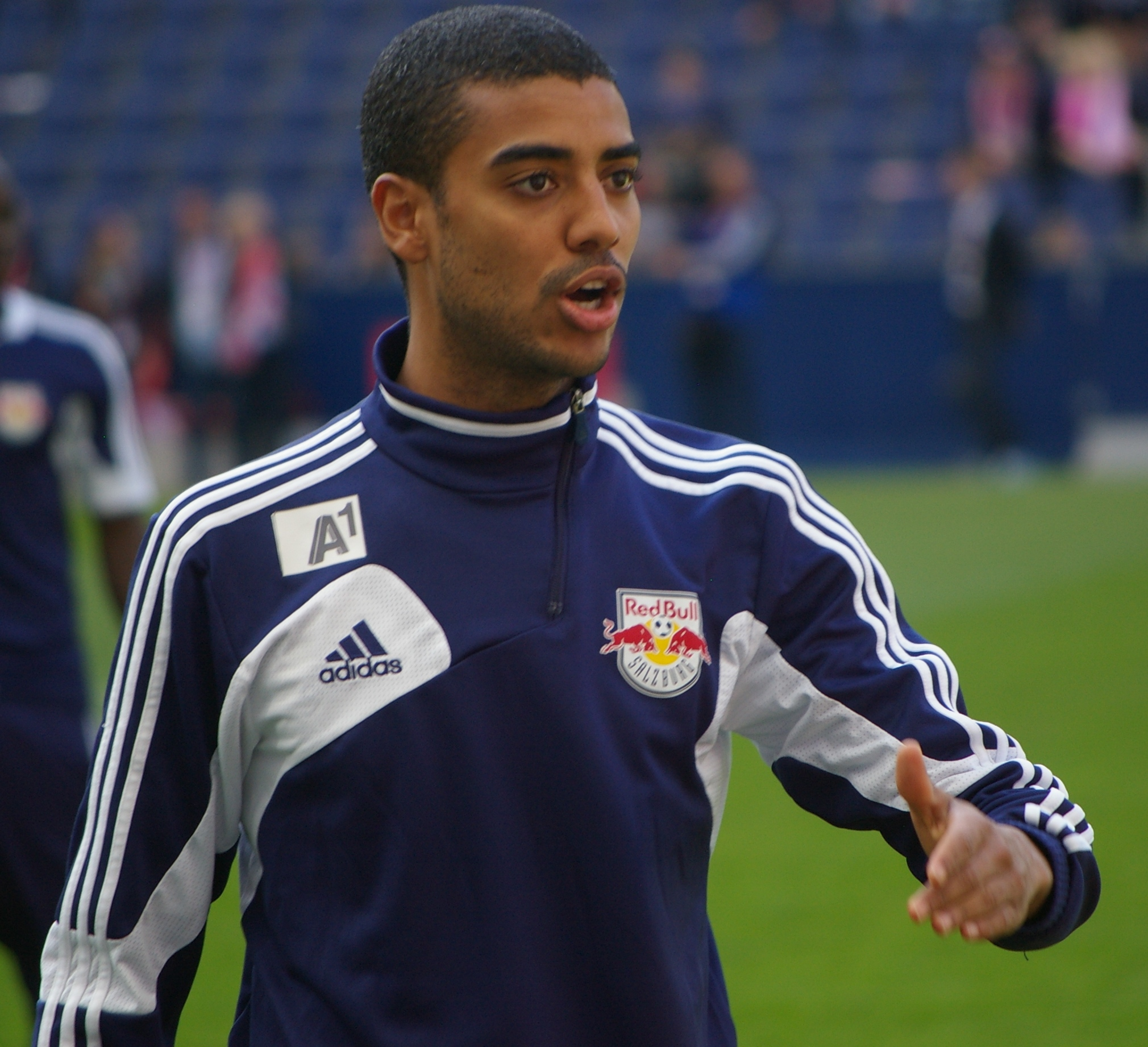
Despite leaving European football halfway through the season, Red Bull Salzburg's Alan was the joint top scorer

Rank	Player	Team	Goals	Minutes played
1	(Brazil) Alan	(Austria) Red Bull Salzburg	8	423
1	(Belgium) Romelu Lukaku	(England) Everton	8	634
3	(Colombia) Carlos Bacca	(Spain) Sevilla	7	765
3	(Argentina) Gonzalo Higuaín	(Italy) Napoli	7	833
5	(Greece) Stefanos Athanasiadis	(Greece) PAOK	6	516
5	(France) Guillaume Hoarau	(Switzerland) Young Boys	6	605
5	(Spain) Jonathan Soriano	(Austria) Red Bull Salzburg	6	613
5	(Argentina) Luciano Vietto	(Spain) Villarreal	6	732
5	(Israel) Lior Refaelov	(Belgium) Club Brugge	6	789
10	(Romania) Raul Rusescu	(Romania) Steaua București	5	147
10	(England) Harry Kane	(England) Tottenham Hotspur	5	422
10	(Czech Republic) David Lafata	(Czech Republic) Sparta Prague	5	440
10	(Croatia) Andrej Kramarić	(Croatia) Rijeka	5	505
10	(France) Claudio Beauvue	(France) Guingamp	5	720
10	(Senegal) Demba Ba	(Turkey) Beşiktaş	5	729
10	(Belgium) Kevin De Bruyne	(Germany) VfL Wolfsburg	5	981

Source: UEFA.com

=== Top assists ===
Rank	Player	Team	Assists	Minutes played
1	(Argentina) Luciano Vietto	(Spain) Villarreal	6	732
1	(Ukraine) Andriy Yarmolenko	(Ukraine) Dynamo Kyiv	6	933
3	(Turkey) Colin Kazim-Richards	(Netherlands) Feyenoord	5	560
3	(Belgium) Kevin De Bruyne	(Germany) VfL Wolfsburg	5	981
5	(Greece) Vasilis Torosidis	(Italy) Roma	4	297
5	(England) Leighton Baines	(England) Everton	4	450
5	(Romania) Alexandru Chipciu	(Romania) Steaua București	4	450
5	(Slovenia) Kevin Kampl	(Austria) Red Bull Salzburg	4	540
5	(Israel) Lior Refaelov	(Belgium) Club Brugge	4	789
5	(Turkey) Gökhan Töre	(Turkey) Beşiktaş	4	886

Source: UEFA.com

=== Squad of the Season ===
The UEFA technical study group selected the following 18 players as the squad of the tournament:

Pos.	Player	Team
GK	(Ukraine) Denys Boyko	(Ukraine) Dnipro Dnipropetrovsk
GK	(Spain) Sergio Rico	(Spain) Sevilla
DF	(Brazil) Douglas	(Ukraine) Dnipro Dnipropetrovsk
DF	(Algeria) Faouzi Ghoulam	(Italy) Napoli
DF	(France) Timothée Kolodziejczak	(Spain) Sevilla
DF	(Spain) Raúl Albiol	(Italy) Napoli
DF	(Spain) Aleix Vidal	(Spain) Sevilla
MF	(Spain) Borja Valero	(Italy) Fiorentina
MF	(Belgium) Kevin De Bruyne	(Germany) VfL Wolfsburg
MF	(Argentina) Éver Banega	(Spain) Sevilla
MF	(Slovakia) Marek Hamšík	(Italy) Napoli
MF	(Poland) Grzegorz Krychowiak	(Spain) Sevilla
MF	(Ukraine) Ruslan Rotan	(Ukraine) Dnipro Dnipropetrovsk
MF	(Cameroon) Stéphane Mbia	(Spain) Sevilla
FW	(Brazil) Alan	(Austria) Red Bull Salzburg
FW	(Colombia) Carlos Bacca	(Spain) Sevilla
FW	(Argentina) Gonzalo Higuaín	(Italy) Napoli
FW	(Ukraine) Yevhen Konoplyanka	(Ukraine) Dnipro Dnipropetrovsk

== See also ==
- 2014–15 UEFA Champions League
- 2015 UEFA Super Cup
