= Labinot Kabashi =

Kosovan footballer (born 2000)

Personal information
- Full name: Labinot Kabashi
- Date of birth: 28 February 2000 (age 26)
- Place of birth: Vantaa, Finland
- Height: 1.75 m (5 ft 9 in)
- Position: Midfielder

Youth career
- 2008–2010: Gimnàstic
- 2010–2020: Barcelona

Senior career*
Years	Team	Apps	(Gls)
2020	Barcelona B	0	(0)
2020–2022	Villarreal C	13	(2)
Total		13	(2)
- * Club domestic league appearances and goals as of 20 September 2022

Labinot Kabashi (born 28 February 2000) is a former footballer who played as a midfielder.

Described as a technical player, Kabashi was capable of playing as either a midfielder or a winger. In his youth, he drew comparisons to Spanish player Andrés Iniesta. Born in Finland, he had opted to play for Kosovo internationally, but never managed to make an international appearance.

== Club career ==
=== Barcelona ===
Kabashi joined FC Barcelona's youth setup from Gimnàstic when he was 10 years old. In November 2016, he suffered an ACL injury that kept him on the sidelines for a year and a half. He once again suffered the same injury in March 2018, keeping him out for almost a year. On 9 February 2019, it was announced that he would return with the U19's in a match against CE Europa. Upon his return he injured himself again, seven minutes after coming off the bench. The following 15 February, he renewed with the club until 30 June 2021.

On 30 January 2020, he was promoted to Barcelona B. Barcelona terminated his contract the following 5 October.

=== Villarreal C ===
On 28 October 2020, Villarreal CF published the squad list for Villarreal C for the 2020–21 season, and Kabashi was included. Three days later, he made his debut in a 3–3 away draw against Atlético Saguntino after coming on as a substitute at 46th minute in place of Richard Franco. On 3 February 2021, Kabashi scored his first goal for Villarreal C in his fourth appearance for the club in a 1–2 away win over Acero in Tercera División.

== International career ==
He was eligible for Kosovo and Spain internationally, as well as Finland, his country of birth. On 2 October 2016, Kabashi was called up to the Kosovo senior national team at only 16 years of age. He was an unused substitute in the World Cup qualifying matches against Croatia, and Ukraine, due to Barcelona indirectly sending a request through Kabashi's father to ask the national team not to play Kabashi in the matches, because there could be problems after activation.

== Personal life ==
Kabashi was born in Vantaa, Finland, to a Kosovo Albanian father and a Finnish mother. He has dual citizenship of Finland and Kosovo, and his cousins Armend, Elbasan and Astrit Kabashi are also footballers who mainly play in the lower categories of Finnish football.

== Honours ==
Barcelona

- UEFA Youth League: 2017–18
