= Bojan Gjorgievski =

Macedonian footballer (born 1992)

Personal information
- Date of birth: 25 January 1992 (age 34)
- Place of birth: Skopje, SFR Yugoslavia
- Height: 1.74 m (5 ft 9 in)
- Position: Right-back

Team information
- Current team: Bregalnica Štip

Senior career*
| Years | Team | Apps | (Gls) |
| 2009–2011 | Vardar | 31 | (0) |
| 2011 | Metalurg Skopje | 4 | (0) |
| 2012 | BATE Borisov | 0 | (0) |
| 2012 | → Skonto (loan) | 17 | (0) |
| 2013–2015 | Metalurg Skopje | 82 | (2) |
| 2016 | Horizont Turnovo | 8 | (1) |
| 2016 | Neftochimic Burgas | 4 | (0) |
| 2017 | Pobeda | 17 | (0) |
| 2017 | Mačva Šabac | 3 | (0) |
| 2018–2019 | Teuta Durrës | 36 | (1) |
| 2019 | Rabotnički | 15 | (0) |
| 2019 | Shkupi | 2 | (0) |
| 2020 | Kit-Go | | |
| 2020– | Bregalnica Štip | | |

International career
| 2010–2011 | Macedonia U19 | 5 | (0) |
| 2012–2013 | Macedonia U21 | 7 | (1) |
- * Club domestic league appearances and goals as of 20:58, 5 August 2019 (UTC)

Bojan Gjorgievski (born 25 January 1992) is a Macedonian footballer who plays as a right-back for Bregalnica Štip.

== Club career ==
In July 2016, Georgievski signed a contract with Bulgarian side Neftochimic Burgas but was released after six months.

In the summer 2020, Gjorgievski joined Macedonian second division club Bregalnica Štip.
