= Guima (footballer, born 1986) =

Portuguese footballer

Personal information
- Full name: Bruno Guimarães Pinho de Azevedo
- Date of birth: 11 March 1986 (age 40)
- Place of birth: Santa Maria da Feira, Portugal
- Height: 1.90 m (6 ft 3 in)
- Position: Striker

Youth career
- 1997–2005: Feirense

Senior career*
Years	Team	Apps	(Gls)
2005–2006	Valecambrense		
2006–2008	Feirense	23	(0)
2008	→ Pampilhosa (loan)	14	(4)
2008–2009	Fiães	33	(15)
2009–2010	Académico Viseu	26	(4)
2010–2012	Oliveirense	36	(9)
2012–2013	Žilina	11	(2)
2013–2014	Oliveirense	50	(13)
2014–2016	CFR Cluj	24	(6)
2016–2017	Feirense	2	(0)
Total		219	(53)
- * Club domestic league appearances and goals

Bruno Guimarães Pinho de Azevedo (born 11 March 1986), known as Guima, is a Portuguese former professional footballer who played as a striker.

== Club career ==
=== Portugal ===
Guima was born in Santa Maria da Feira, Aveiro District. After finishing his development at C.D. Feirense he started his senior career in amateur football with Associação Desportiva Valecambrense, then returned to his previous team to play one and a half seasons in the Segunda Liga. He finished the 2007–08 campaign on loan to F.C. Pampilhosa in the third division.

Guima then spent two years in the lower leagues, returning to division two in summer 2010 after signing for U.D. Oliveirense. He scored nine goals in his second year, helping the side to the sixth position.

=== Žilina ===
On 7 July 2012, Guima signed a two-year deal with MŠK Žilina in Slovakia. He was released by the club on 4 January of the following year, returning to Oliveirense shortly after.

=== Later career ===
After two full seasons in the Romanian Liga I with CFR Cluj, free agent Guima joined Primeira Liga club Feirense in September 2016. He made his debut in the competition on 4 December, coming on as a second-half substitute in a 0–2 home loss against F.C. Arouca.

Guima left the Estádio Marcolino de Castro in January 2017 by mutual consent, after only three competitive appearances to his credit.
