= Armend Kabashi =

Finnish footballer of Kosovo Albanian descent

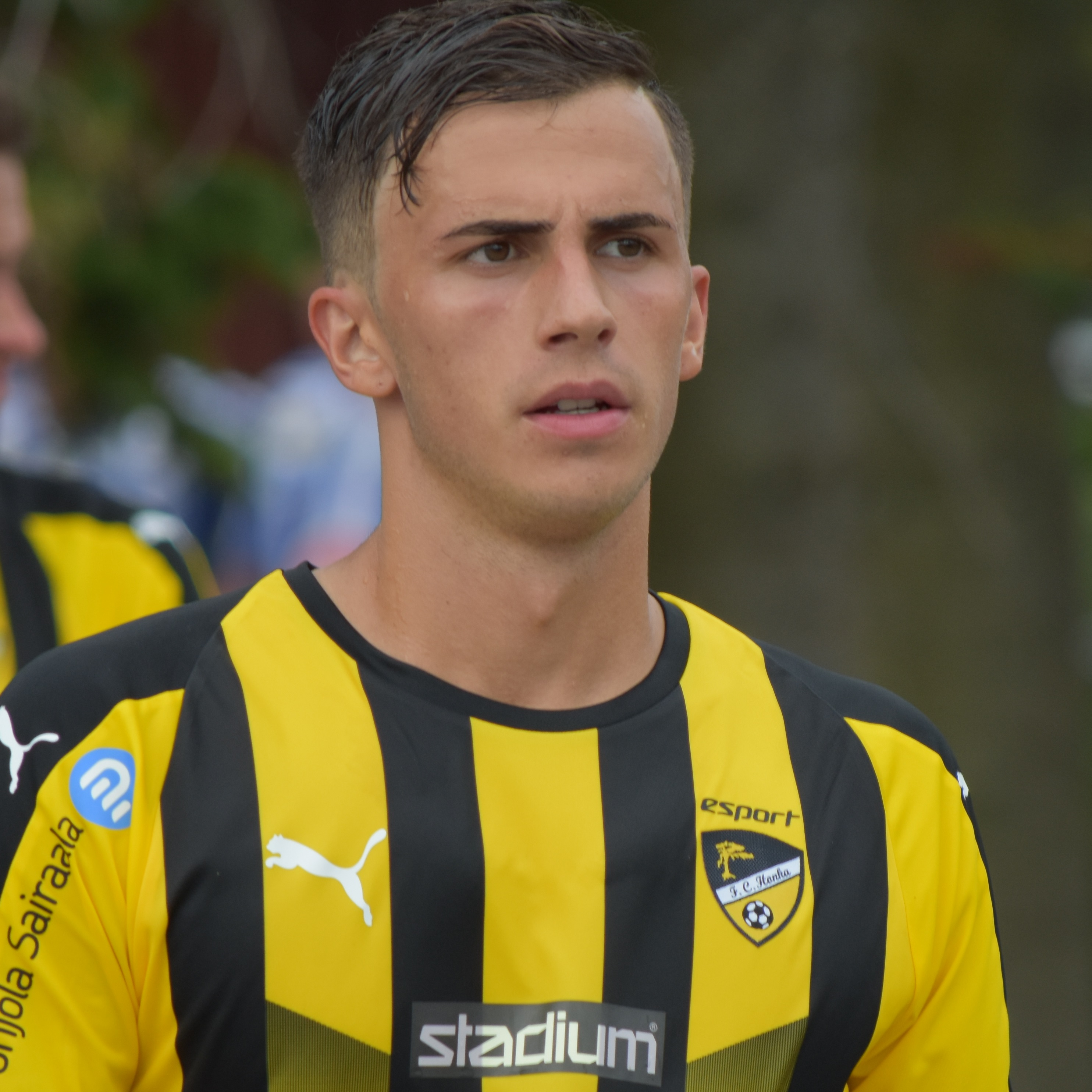
- Kabashi with FC Honka in 2018.

Personal information
- Date of birth: 4 December 1995 (age 30)
- Place of birth: Bad Saulgau, Germany
- Height: 1.82 m (6 ft 0 in)
- Position: Midfielder

Team information
- Current team: Lahti
- Number: 28

Youth career
- 2006–2007: LePa
- 2007–2013: Honka

Senior career*
Years	Team	Apps	(Gls)
2011–2013	Pallohonka	45	(0)
2012–2014	Honka	25	(0)
2013	→ Viikingit (loan)	8	(1)
2015–2017	Eintracht Braunschweig II	49	(0)
2017–2018	TuS Erndtebrück	15	(2)
2018–2019	Honka	11	(0)
2020	KPV	4	(1)
2021	Gnistan	18	(0)
2022	AC Oulu	20	(1)
2023–2025	Gnistan	47	(1)
2026–	Lahti	17	(0)

International career
2014–2016	Finland U21	11	(0)
- * Club domestic league appearances and goals as of 13 November 2026

Armend Kabashi (born 4 December 1995) is a Finnish professional football midfielder for Veikkausliiga side Lahti. He began his senior club career playing for Pallohonka, before making his league debut for Honka at age 18 in 2012.

== Club career ==
=== Pallohonka ===
He made his first appearance on senior level on 5 May 2011 in the ranks of Pallohonka in a Kakkonen match against Sudet.

=== Honka ===
Kabashi made his professional debut on 6 April 2014 in a Veikkausliiga match for FC Honka against MYPA.

=== Eintracht Braunschweig II ===
In 2015, he joined the reserve side of German club Eintracht Braunschweig in the Regionalliga Nord.

=== Return to FC Honka ===
Kabashi returned to FC Honka in January 2018 and left the club again at the end of the year. However, he returned for the third time on 29 August 2019, signing a contract for the rest of the year with an option for one further year.

=== Gnistan ===
After a spell at KPV in the 2020 season, Kabashi moved to second-tier Ykkönen club IF Gnistan on 21 April 2021, signing a deal for the rest of the year.

=== Oulu ===
On 29 January 2022, he signed with Oulu for the 2022 Veikkausliiga season.

== International career ==
Kabashi was 18 years old on 5 September 2014 when he debuted in Finland national under-21 football team in a UEFA European Under-21 Championship qualification match against Wales.

== Personal life ==
Kabashi is of Kosovo Albanian descent. His relatives Labinot Kabashi, Elbasan Kabashi and Astrit Kabashi are also footballers.

== Career statistics ==
As of 27 July 2026

Club	Season	Division	League		Cup (Note: Includes Suomen Cup)		Europe		Other		Total	
Club	Season	Division	Apps	Goals	Apps	Goals	Apps	Goals	Apps	Goals	Apps	Goals
Pallohonka	2011	Kakkonen	10	0	–		–		–		10	0
Pallohonka	2012	Kakkonen	22	0	–		–		–		22	0
Pallohonka	2013	Kakkonen	13	0	–		–		–		13	0
Pallohonka	Total		45	0	0	0	0	0	0	0	45	0
Honka	2012	Veikkausliiga	0	0	0	0	–		1 (Note: Includes Finnish League Cup)	0	1	0
Honka	2013	Veikkausliiga	0	0	1	0	–		2	0	3	0
Honka	2014	Veikkausliiga	26	0	1	0	2 (Note: Includes UEFA Europa League)	1	4	0	33	1
Honka	Total		26	0	2	0	2	1	7	0	37	1
Viikingit (loan)	2013	Ykkönen	8	1	0	0	–		–		8	1
Eintracht Braunschweig II	2015–16	Regionalliga Nord	20	0	0	0	–		–		20	0
Eintracht Braunschweig II	2016–17	Regionalliga Nord	29	0	0	0	–		–		29	0
Eintracht Braunschweig II	Total		49	0	0	0	0	0	0	0	49	0
TuS Erndtebrück	2017–18	Regionalliga West	15	2	0	0	–		2 (Note: Includes Westfalenpokal)	0	17	2
Honka	2018	Veikkausliiga	6	0	–		–		–		6	0
Honka	2019	Veikkausliiga	5	0	–		–		–		5	0
Honka	Total		11	0	0	0	0	0	0	0	11	0
KPV	2020	Ykkönen	4	1	1	0	–		–		5	1
Gnistan	2021	Ykkönen	18	0	0	0	–		–		18	0
AC Oulu	2022	Veikkausliiga	20	1	2	0	–		2	0	24	1
Gnistan	2023	Ykkönen	10	1	–		–		–		10	1
Gnistan	2024	Veikkausliiga	20	0	0	0	–		4	0	24	0
Gnistan	2025	Veikkausliiga	20	0	2	0	–		3	0	25	0
Gnistan	Total		50	1	2	0	0	0	7	0	59	1
Lahti	2026	Veikkausliiga	11	0	3	0	–		3	0	17	0
Career Total			257	6	10	0	2	1	21	0	290	7

== Honours ==
Gnistan

- Ykkönen runner-up: 2023

TuS Erndtebrück

- Westphalian Cup runner-up: 2017–18

Honka

- Finnish Cup: 2012
