= 2014–15 GNK Dinamo Zagreb season =

Dinamo Zagreb
2014–15 season
- Chairman: Mirko Barišić
- Manager: Zoran Mamić
- Stadium: Stadion Maksimir
- Croatian First Football League: 1st
- Croatian Football Cup: Winners
- Croatian Football Super Cup: Runners-up
- UEFA Champions League: Third qualifying round
- UEFA Europa League: Group stage
- Top goalscorer: League: Ángelo Henríquez (20)
- Highest home attendance: 15,000 v Rijeka (29 May 2015, Croatian First Football League)
- Lowest home attendance: 350 v Lokomotiva (7 February 2015, Croatian First Football League)
- Average home league attendance: 3,074
- Biggest win: 5–0 v Zadar (Home, 2 August 2014, Croatian First Football League); 5–0 v Osijek (Home, 26 October 2014, Croatian First Football League)
- Biggest defeat: 1–5 v Red Bull Salzburg (Home, 6 November 2014, UEFA Europa League)

The 2014–15 season was Građanski nogometni klub Dinamo Zagreb's 24th season in the Croatian First Football League and 103rd year existing as a football club. In addition to the domestic league, Dinamo Zagreb participated in that season's editions of the Croatian Football Cup, the Croatian Football Super Cup, the UEFA Champions League and the UEFA Europa League.

== Squad ==
Squad at end of season

Note: Flags indicate national team as defined under FIFA eligibility rules; some limited exceptions apply. Players may hold more than one non-FIFA nationality.

No.	Pos.	Nation	Player
1	GK	CRO	Antonijo Ježina
2	FW	ALG	Hillal Soudani
3	DF	CRO	Mario Musa
5	DF	CRO	Jozo Šimunović
6	DF	POR	Ivo Pinto
7	MF	BIH	Said Husejinović
8	MF	CRO	Domagoj Antolić
9	FW	CHI	Ángelo Henríquez
10	MF	POR	Paulo Machado
11	FW	CHI	Junior Fernandes
15	FW	BIH	Armin Hodžić
16	MF	MKD	Arijan Ademi

No.	Pos.	Nation	Player
18	MF	CRO	Domagoj Pavičić
19	DF	CRO	Josip Pivarić
20	MF	CRO	Marko Pjaca
22	DF	ARG	Leonardo Sigali
23	MF	POR	Gonçalo Santos
24	MF	CRO	Ante Ćorić
33	GK	CRO	Marko Mikulic
34	GK	POR	Eduardo Carvalho
55	MF	CRO	Ognjen Vukojević
77	DF	ROU	Alexandru Mățel
87	DF	FRA	Jérémy Taravel

== Competitions ==
=== Overview ===
Competition	First match	Last match	Starting round	Final position	Record							
Competition	First match	Last match	Starting round	Final position	Pld	W	D	L	GF	GA	GD	Win %
Croatian First Football League	18 July 2014	29 May 2015	Matchday 1	Winners	36	26	10	0	85	21	+64	72.22
Croatian Football Cup	24 September 2014	20 May 2015	First round	Winners	7	5	2	0	12	4	+8	71.43
Croatian Football Super Cup	11 July 2014		Final	Runners-up	1	0	0	1	1	2	−1	0.00
UEFA Champions League	15 July 2014	6 August 2014	Second qualifying round	Third qualifying round	4	3	0	1	5	2	+3	75.00
UEFA Europa League	21 August 2014	11 December 2014	Play-off round	Group stage	8	4	0	4	17	17	+0	50.00
Total					56	38	12	6	120	46	+74	67.86

Source: Competitions

=== Croatian First Football League ===
==== League table ====
Pos	Team	Pld	W	D	L	GF	GA	GD	Pts	Qualification or relegation
1	Dinamo Zagreb (C)	36	26	10	0	85	21	+64	88	Qualification to Champions League second qualifying round
2	Rijeka	36	22	9	5	76	29	+47	75	Qualification to Europa League second qualifying round
3	Hajduk Split (Note: Hajduk Split were deducted 3 points for not showing up for the match against Dinamo Zagreb in the 16th round.)	36	15	8	13	59	56	+3	50	Qualification to Europa League first qualifying round
4	Lokomotiva	36	13	7	16	59	68	−9	46	Qualification to Europa League first qualifying round
5	NK Zagreb	36	13	7	16	45	54	−9	46	

Source: Sportnet.hr
Rules for classification: 1) points; 2) goal difference; 3) number of goals scored.
For deciding champions, qualification to UEFA Europa League and relegation: 1st points; 2nd head-to-head points; 3rd head-to-head goal difference; 4th head-to-head away goals scored
(C) Champions

==== Results summary ====
Overall								Home						Away					
Pld	W	D	L	GF	GA	GD	Pts	W	D	L	GF	GA	GD	W	D	L	GF	GA	GD
36	26	10	0	85	21	+64	88	17	1	0	53	5	+48	9	9	0	32	16	+16

Source: Matches

==== Results by round ====
Round	1	2	3	4	5	6	7	8	9	10	11	12	13	14	15	16	17	18	19	20	21	22	23	24	25	26	27	28	29	30	31	32	33	34	35	36
Ground	H	A	H	A	H	H	A	H	A	A	H	A	H	A	A	H	A	H	H	H	H	A	H	H	A	H	A	A	A	A	H	A	A	H	A	H
Result	W	W	W	W	W	D	W	W	W	D	W	W	W	D	D	W	W	W	W	W	W	D	W	W	D	W	D	D	W	W	W	W	D	W	D	W
Position	1	1	1	1	1	1	1	1	1	1	1	1	1	1	1	1	1	1	1	1	1	1	1	1	1	1	1	1	1	1	1	1	1	1	1	1
Points	3	6	9	12	15	16	19	22	25	26	29	32	35	36	37	40	43	46	49	52	55	56	59	62	63	66	67	68	71	74	77	80	81	84	85	88

Source: Worldfootball.net
A = Away; H = Home; W = Win; D = Draw; L = Loss

==== Matches ====
18 July 2014 1	Dinamo Zagreb	4–0	Slaven Belupo	Zagreb
20:15 CEST (UTC+2)	Pjaca 14'; M. Brozović 48'; Soudani 57'; Andrijašević 90+2'	Report	Ozobić (yellow card) 17'	Stadium: Stadion Maksimir; Attendance: 1,800; Referee: Ivan Bebek; Assistant referees: Robi Kezele, Ivica Radošević

25 July 2014 2	Lokomotiva	3–4	Dinamo Zagreb	Zagreb
20:15 CEST (UTC+2)	Budimir 14', 28', 38', (yellow card) 71'; Musa (yellow card) 66'	Report	Ćalušić 25' (o.g.); Soudani (yellow card) 66', (goal) 89', 90+4'; Ibáñez (yellow card) 70'; Pjaca 81'	Stadium: Stadion Kranjčevićeva; Attendance: 3,200; Referee: Fran Jović; Assistant referees: Ivica Modrić, Krunoslav Ambrinac

2 August 2014 3	Dinamo Zagreb	5–0	Zadar	Zagreb
21:00 CEST (UTC+2)	Čop 24', 80', 89'; Ademi 28'; Soudani 52'	Report	Ikić (yellow card) 33'; Ješe (yellow card) 54'	Stadium: Stadion Maksimir; Attendance: 1,976; Referee: Marin Vidulin; Assistant referees: Robi Kezele, Jerko Crnčić

9 August 2014 4	Osijek	1–2	Dinamo Zagreb	Osijek
21:00 CEST (UTC+2)	Špehar (yellow card) 23'; Bralić (yellow card) 71'; Barišić 79' (pen.), (yellow card) 79'	Report	Čop 14', 72' (pen.); Santos (yellow card) 22'; Ibáñez (yellow card) 90+1'	Stadium: Gradski Vrt Stadium; Attendance: 4,000; Referee: Goran Gabrilo; Assistant referees: Siniša Premužaj, Goran Perica

15 August 2014 5	Dinamo Zagreb	1–0	RNK Split	Zagreb
20:15 CEST (UTC+2)	Sigali (yellow card) 17'; Čop 45', (yellow card) 50'	Report	Dujmović (yellow card) 9'	Stadium: Stadion Maksimir; Attendance: 2,179; Referee: Domagoj Vučkov; Assistant referees: Siniša Premužaj, Robi Kezele

24 August 2014 6	Dinamo Zagreb	1–1	NK Zagreb	Zagreb
21:00 CEST (UTC+2)	Ibáñez 9'; Vukojević (yellow card) 49'	Report	Kolinger (yellow card) 26'; Stepčić 60', (yellow card) 86'; Livaković (yellow card) 90'	Stadium: Stadion Maksimir; Attendance: 1,500; Referee: Fran Jović; Assistant referees: Ivica Modrić, Jerko Crnčić

31 August 2014 7	Hajduk Split	2–3	Dinamo Zagreb	Split
19:00 CEST (UTC+2)	Sušić 8', (yellow card) 74'; Vršajević (yellow card) 10'; Caktaš (yellow card) 30'; Anđelković (yellow card) 43'; Milić 49', (yellow card) 86'; Maglica (yellow card) 61'; Bradarić (yellow card) 90'	Report	Šimunović (yellow card) 61'; Čop 71', 90'; Šimunić (yellow card) 90+3'; Sigali 90+4'	Stadium: Stadion Poljud; Attendance: 17,000; Referee: Ivan Bebek; Assistant referees: Tomislav Petrović, Miro Grgić

13 September 2014 8	Dinamo Zagreb	2–0	Istra 1961	Zagreb
19:00 CEST (UTC+2)	Henríquez 49'; Eduardo 76'	Report		Stadium: Stadion Maksimir; Attendance: 1,100; Referee: Bruno Marić; Assistant referees: Dražen Fejer, Goran Loparac

21 September 2014 9	Rijeka	1–2	Dinamo Zagreb	Rijeka
19:00 CEST (UTC+2)	Leovac (yellow card) 17'; Kramarić 59'; Sharbini (yellow card) 82'	Report	Soudani 33', 69'; Pivarić (yellow card) 53'; Šimunić (yellow card) 55'	Stadium: Stadion Kantrida; Attendance: 8,000; Referee: Ante Vučemilović Šimunović; Assistant referees: Tomislav Petrović, Miro Grgić

27 September 2014 10	Slaven Belupo	0–0	Dinamo Zagreb	Koprivnica
16:00 CEST (UTC+2)	Purić (yellow card) 45'; Ozobić (yellow card) 77'; Grgić (yellow card) 90'	Report	M. Brozović (yellow card) 86'	Stadium: Gradski Stadion; Attendance: 3,000; Referee: Ivan Bebek; Assistant referees: Dalibor Conjar, Bojan Zobenica

5 October 2014 11	Dinamo Zagreb	3–0	Lokomotiva	Zagreb
19:00 CEST (UTC+2)	Henríquez 9', 38' (pen.), 86'	Report	Mrčela (yellow card) 38'; Mrzljak (yellow card) 40'; Begonja (yellow card) 60'	Stadium: Stadion Maksimir; Attendance: 1,200; Referee: Jurica Mihalj; Assistant referees: Ivica Modrić, Krunoslav Ambrinac

18 October 2014 12	Zadar	1–3	Dinamo Zagreb	Zadar
15:00 CEST (UTC+2)	Pešić 23'; Pušić (yellow card) 76'	Report	Pjaca 37'; Matković 86' (o.g.); Andrijašević 90+1'	Stadium: Stadion Stanovi; Attendance: 2,500; Referee: Ante Vučemilović Šimunović; Assistant referees: Dalibor Conjar, Dejan Berger

26 October 2014 13	Dinamo Zagreb	5–0	Osijek	Zagreb
15:00 CET (UTC+1)	Čop 10'; Taravel 51'; Soudani 53', 70'; Šimunović (yellow card) 60'; Fernandes 62'; Andrijašević (yellow card) 89'	Report	Mešanović (yellow card) 31'	Stadium: Stadion Maksimir; Attendance: 2,000; Referee: Mario Zebec; Assistant referees: Siniša Premužaj, Saša Fegeš

1 November 2014 14	RNK Split	0–0	Dinamo Zagreb	Split
15:00 CET (UTC+1)	Dujmović (yellow card) 90+2'	Report	Šimunović (yellow card) 69'; Eduardo (yellow card) 90+2'	Stadium: Stadion Park Mladeži; Attendance: 1,800; Referee: Bruno Marić; Assistant referees: Miro Grgić, Dejan Berger

9 November 2014 15	NK Zagreb	0–0	Dinamo Zagreb	Zagreb
15:00 CET (UTC+1)	Jurendić (yellow card) 55' (yellow-red card) 68'; Stepčić (yellow card) 75'; Krovinović (yellow card) 84'	Report	Ademi (yellow card) 40'; M. Brozović (yellow card) 45'	Stadium: Stadion Kranjčevićeva; Attendance: 2,200; Referee: Fran Jović; Assistant referees: Ivica Modrić, Krunoslav Ambrinac

22 November 2014 16	Dinamo Zagreb	3–0; Awarded (Note: The match was awarded after Hajduk Split refused to play in protest of a ban on a portion of their traveling supporters, resulting in the team not taking the field. Consequently, the fixture was forfeited and a 3–0 victory granted to Dinamo Zagreb.)	Hajduk Split	Zagreb
15:00 CET (UTC+1)		Report		Stadium: Stadion Maksimir; Attendance: 3,524; Referee: Ante Vučemilović Šimunović; Assistant referees: Tomislav Petrović, Miro Grgić

30 November 2014 17	Istra 1961	0–4	Dinamo Zagreb	Pula
15:00 CET (UTC+1)	Tomić (yellow card) 33'	Report	Pjaca 2'; Pivarić (yellow card) 25'; Soudani 51'; Fernandes 70'; Andrijašević 90+1'	Stadium: Stadion Aldo Drosina; Attendance: 1,600; Referee: Bruno Marić; Assistant referees: Borut Križarić, Goran Pataki

6 December 2014 18	Dinamo Zagreb	3–0	Rijeka	Zagreb
15:00 CET (UTC+1)	Ademi 40'; Henríquez 52'; Pivarić (yellow card) 59'; M. Brozović (yellow card) 63'; Čop 86'	Report	Jajalo (yellow card) 46'; Kvržić (yellow card) 59'; Lešković (yellow card) 90+2'	Stadium: Stadion Maksimir; Attendance: 3,122; Referee: Mario Zebec; Assistant referees: Tomislav Petrović, Miro Grgić

14 December 2014 19	Dinamo Zagreb	3–2	Slaven Belupo	Zagreb
15:00 CET (UTC+1)	Pjaca 8'; Ademi (yellow card) 36'; Čop 45', 60'; Vukojević (yellow card) 52'; Pinto (yellow card) 79'	Report	Delić (yellow card) 35', (goal) 72'; Cesarec 89'	Stadium: Stadion Maksimir; Attendance: 1,000; Referee: Marko Matoc; Assistant referees: Jerko Crnčić, Davor Kožarec

7 February 2015 20	Dinamo Zagreb	2–1	Lokomotiva	Zagreb
15:00 CET (UTC+1)	Ademi 10'; Henríquez 67'	Report	Andrijašević (yellow card) 11'; Doležal 90+1'	Stadium: Stadion Maksimir; Attendance: 350; Referee: Fran Jović; Assistant referees: Igor Krmar, Krunoslav Ambrinac

16 February 2015 21	Dinamo Zagreb	2–0	Zadar	Zagreb
17:00 CET (UTC+1)	Mățel (yellow card) 34'; Fernandes 40'; Pinto (yellow card) 57'; Sigali 68'	Report	Jurkić (yellow card) 32'	Stadium: Stadion Maksimir; Attendance: 941; Referee: Marin Vidulin; Assistant referees: Miro Grgić, Hrvoje Barišić

22 February 2015 22	Osijek	1–1	Dinamo Zagreb	Osijek
15:00 CET (UTC+1)	Matas (yellow card) 82'; Mešanović 84'	Report	Pavičić 26'; Henríquez (yellow card) 82'; Sigali (yellow card) 87'	Stadium: Gradski Vrt Stadium; Attendance: 4,000; Referee: Bruno Marić; Assistant referees: Siniša Premužaj, Goran Loparac

28 February 2015 23	Dinamo Zagreb	2–0	RNK Split	Zagreb
15:00 CET (UTC+1)	Henríquez 17' (pen.); Machado (yellow card) 24'; Ademi (yellow card) 34'; Fernandes 34'; Sigali (yellow card) 40'; Taravel (yellow card) 84'; Pinto (yellow card) 89'	Report	Rugašević (yellow card) 9'; Barbarić (yellow card) 20'; Jukić (yellow card) 85'; Vidović (yellow card) 86'	Stadium: Stadion Maksimir; Attendance: 1,200; Referee: Damir Batinić; Assistant referees: Tomislav Petrović, Dalibor Conjar

7 March 2015 24	Dinamo Zagreb	2–0	NK Zagreb	Zagreb
15:00 CET (UTC+1)	Mățel (yellow card) 7'; Henríquez 28', 43'; Šimunović (yellow card) 82'	Report		Stadium: Stadion Maksimir; Attendance: 1,300; Referee: Jurica Mihalj; Assistant referees: Igor Krmar, Saša Fegeš

14 March 2015 25	Hajduk Split	1–1	Dinamo Zagreb	Split
15:00 CET (UTC+1)	Vršajević (yellow card) 45'; Mikanović (yellow card) 48'; Milevskyi (yellow card) 49'; Balić 74'; Sušić (yellow card) 85'; Maloča (yellow card) 90'	Report	Taravel (yellow card) 32'; Fiolić (yellow card) 42'; Fernandes (yellow card) 60'; Ademi (yellow card) 72'; Machado 90+4'	Stadium: Stadion Poljud; Attendance: 16,000; Referee: Ante Vučemilović Šimunović; Assistant referees: Tomislav Petrović, Miro Grgić

21 March 2015 26	Dinamo Zagreb	4–1	Istra 1961	Zagreb
15:00 CET (UTC+1)	Machado 11'; Henríquez 32'; Pjaca 45', 72'; Santos (yellow card) 74'	Report	Špehar 42'	Stadium: Stadion Maksimir; Attendance: 1,472; Referee: Marko Matoc; Assistant referees: Jerko Crnčić, Goran Loparac

4 April 2015 27	Rijeka	2–2	Dinamo Zagreb	Rijeka
17:00 CEST (UTC+2)	Jugović (yellow card) 25'; Balaj 30'; Bradarić (yellow card) 57'; Sharbini (yellow card) 60'; Močinić (yellow card) 64'; Radošević 90+4'	Report	Taravel (yellow card) 27'; Pjaca 46'; Fernandes (yellow card) 56' (yellow-red card) 82'; Sigali 82'; Pinto (yellow card) 89'; Vukojević (yellow card) 90+4'	Stadium: Stadion Kantrida; Attendance: 6,600; Referee: Marijo Strahonja; Assistant referees: Mario Pepur, Hrvoje Radić

12 April 2015 28	Slaven Belupo	0–0	Dinamo Zagreb	Koprivnica
17:00 CEST (UTC+2)		Report	Sigali (yellow card) 36'; Machado (yellow card) 55'; Šimunović (yellow card) 74'; Soudani (yellow card) 83'	Stadium: Gradski Stadion; Attendance: 3,500; Referee: Jurica Mihalj; Assistant referees: Jerko Crnčić, Goran Loparac

17 April 2015 29	Lokomotiva	1–2	Dinamo Zagreb	Zagreb
18:00 CEST (UTC+2)	Prenga (yellow card) 57'; Gržan 77'	Report	Soudani 54'; Henríquez 68'	Stadium: Stadion Kranjčevićeva; Attendance: 3,300; Referee: Goran Gabrilo; Assistant referees: Goran Perica, Robi Kezele

25 April 2015 30	Zadar	0–1	Dinamo Zagreb	Zadar
19:00 CEST (UTC+2)	Pušić (yellow card) 32'; Jerbić (yellow card) 57'; Hrgović (yellow card) 71'	Report	Santos (yellow card) 75'; Pjaca 85', (yellow card) 89'	Stadium: Stadion Stanovi; Attendance: 2,000; Referee: Mario Zebec; Assistant referees: Jerko Crnčić, Dejan Berger

28 April 2015 31	Dinamo Zagreb	3–0	Osijek	Zagreb
18:00 CEST (UTC+2)	Pavičić 20'; Henríquez 50'; Soudani (yellow card) 55'; Ćorić 77'	Report	Jamak (yellow card) 52'; Šorša (yellow card) 68'	Stadium: Stadion Maksimir; Attendance: 1,300; Referee: Duje Strukan; Assistant referees: Mario Pepur, Hrvoje Radić

2 May 2015 32	RNK Split	1–5	Dinamo Zagreb	Split
19:00 CEST (UTC+2)	Blagojević (yellow card) 10' (yellow-red card) 65'; Zagorac (yellow card) 21'; Barbarić (yellow card) 41'; Mršić 44'; Vidović (yellow card) 88'	Report	Henríquez 23' (pen.), 30', 57'; Machado (yellow card) 60'; Santos (yellow card) 76'; Ćorić 78'; Hodžić 80'	Stadium: Stadion Park Mladeži; Attendance: 1,300; Referee: Igor Križarić; Assistant referees: Goran Pataki, Goran Loparac

9 May 2015 33	NK Zagreb	1–1	Dinamo Zagreb	Zagreb
17:00 CEST (UTC+2)	Konopek (yellow card) 37'; Jurendić 45+3', (yellow card) 71'; Muić (yellow card) 58'; Ljubičić (yellow card) 78'	Report	Henríquez 6'; Šimunović (yellow card) 67'	Stadium: Stadion Kranjčevićeva; Attendance: 2,500; Referee: Jurica Mihalj; Assistant referees: Dalibor Conjar, Dejan Berger

16 May 2015 34	Dinamo Zagreb	4–0	Hajduk Split	Zagreb
17:00 CEST (UTC+2)	Ćorić 8'; Henríquez 47', 58', 73'; Ademi (yellow card) 83'; Pinto (yellow card) 87'	Report	Sušić (yellow card) 87'	Stadium: Stadion Maksimir; Attendance: 14,372; Referee: Domagoj Vučkov; Assistant referees: Goran Perica, Robi Kezele

24 May 2015 35	Istra 1961	1–1	Dinamo Zagreb	Pula
17:00 CEST (UTC+2)	Jô 70'; Pavlović (yellow card) 90+2'	Report	Machado (yellow card) 25'; Fernandes 60'; Pinto (yellow card) 75'	Stadium: Stadion Aldo Drosina; Attendance: 5,000; Referee: Bruno Marić; Assistant referees: Dražen Fejer, Dejan Berger

29 May 2015 36	Dinamo Zagreb	4–0	Rijeka	Zagreb
19:00 CEST (UTC+2)	Pjaca 2', 64' (pen.); Taravel 28'; Soudani 73'	Report	Bradarić (yellow card) 31'; Mitrović (yellow card) 63'; Radošević (yellow card) 88'	Stadium: Stadion Maksimir; Attendance: 15,000; Referee: Goran Gabrilo; Assistant referees: Goran Pataki, Dejan Berger

=== Croatian Football Cup ===
24 September 2014 First round	Ponikve	1–2	Dinamo Zagreb	Zagreb
15:30 CEST (UTC+2)	Klarić 18', (yellow card) 18'; Krajcar (yellow card) 50'; Rašić (yellow card) 64'	Report	Henríquez 34'; Sigali (yellow card) 56'; Vukojević 75'; Santos (yellow card) 90+4'	Stadium: SRC Ponikve; Attendance: 3,000; Referee: Fran Jović; Assistant referees: Igor Krmar, Željko Tuđa

29 October 2014 Second round	Opatija	2–4 (a.e.t.)	Dinamo Zagreb	Opatija
14:00 CET (UTC+1)	Dunković 26' (pen.); Jug (yellow card) 30'; Rudan (yellow card) 45'; I. Brozović (yellow card) 51'; Šuker (yellow card) 89', (goal) 109'; Erceg (yellow card) 100'	Report	Vukojević (yellow card) 70'; Šimunić (yellow card) 77'; Santos (yellow card) 81'; Henríquez 90' (pen.), 99', 101', 113', (yellow card) 90'	Stadium: Igralište Opatije; Attendance: 1,000; Referee: Igor Križarić; Assistant referees: Borut Križarić, Saša Fegeš

==== Quarter-finals ====
11 February 2015 First leg	Istra 1961	0–1	Dinamo Zagreb	Pula
17:00 CET (UTC+1)	Heister (yellow card) 76'	Report	Taravel (yellow card) 39'; Vukojević (yellow card) 55'; Fernandes 57'	Stadium: Stadion Aldo Drosina; Attendance: 2,000; Referee: Ante Vučemilović Šimunović; Assistant referees: Hrvoje Barišić, Dejan Berger

3 March 2015 Second leg	Dinamo Zagreb	3–0 (4–0 agg.)	Istra 1961	Zagreb
17:00 CET (UTC+1)	Machado (yellow card) 12'; Ježina (yellow card) 35'; Fernandes 42'; Hodžić 55'; Ćorić 69' (pen.)	Report	Dinis (yellow card) 21' (yellow-red card) 38'	Stadium: Stadion Maksimir; Attendance: 800; Referee: Bruno Marić; Assistant referees: Goran Loparac, Dražen Fejer
Note: Dinamo Zagreb won 4–0 on aggregate.

==== Semi-finals ====
8 April 2015 First leg	Dinamo Zagreb	2–1	Rijeka	Zagreb
18:00 CEST (UTC+2)	Machado 70'; Henríquez (yellow card) 75', (goal) 81'; Sigali (yellow card) 84'	Report	Lešković 6', (yellow card) 32'; Leovac (yellow card) 11'; Sharbini (yellow card) 11'; Mitrović (yellow card) 35'; Bradarić (yellow card) 41'; Vargić (yellow card) 65'	Stadium: Stadion Maksimir; Attendance: 3,100; Referee: Bruno Marić; Assistant referees: Tomislav Petrović, Miro Grgić

22 April 2015 Second leg	Rijeka	0–0 (1–2 agg.)	Dinamo Zagreb	Rijeka
18:30 CEST (UTC+2)	Vešović (yellow card) 34' (red card) 81'; Samardžić (yellow card) 55'; Sharbini (yellow card) 55'; Lešković (yellow card) 61'; Jugović (red card) 81'; Leovac (red card) 90+2'	Report	Taravel (yellow card) 41'; Soudani (yellow card) 83'	Stadium: Stadion Kantrida; Attendance: 8,000; Referee: Mario Zebec; Assistant referees: Borut Križarić, Dalibor Conjar
Note: Dinamo Zagreb won 2–1 on aggregate.

==== Final ====
20 May 2015 Final	Dinamo Zagreb	0–0 (a.e.t.) (4–2 p)	RNK Split	Zagreb
20:00 CEST (UTC+2)	Soudani (yellow card) 9'; Ademi (yellow card) 45+2'; Šimunović (yellow card) 101'; Taravel (yellow card) 114'	Report	Blagojević (yellow card) 7'; Barbarić (yellow card) 13'; Woon (yellow card) 40'; Vidović (yellow card) 45+2'; Rog (yellow card) 81'; Galović (yellow card) 90+3' (yellow-red card) 94'; Majstorović (yellow card) 110'; Rugašević (yellow card) 117'; Zagorac (yellow card) 120+1'	Stadium: Stadion Maksimir; Attendance: 11,500; Referee: Ivan Bebek; Assistant referees: Tomislav Petrović, Miro Grgić
	Penalties
	Henríquez (penalty scored); Taravel (penalty scored); Pivarić (penalty scored); Machado (penalty scored)		(penalty scored) Barbarić; (penalty missed) Rog; (penalty missed) Blagojević; (penalty scored) Mršić
Note: Dinamo Zagreb won 4–2 on penalties.

=== Croatian Football Super Cup ===
Dinamo Zagreb, as Croatian First Football League winners in the previous season, played against Rijeka in the 2014 Croatian Football Super Cup, who themselves won the Croatian Football Cup.

11 July 2014 Final	Dinamo Zagreb	1–2	Rijeka	Rijeka
20:30 CEST (UTC+2)	Leko (yellow card) 9'; Ademi (yellow card) 31'; Sigali 39'; Pjaca (yellow card) 51'; Radonjić (yellow card) 90+2'	Report	Samardžić 11'; Mitrović (yellow card) 38'; Moisés 70'; Krstanović (yellow card) 87'	Stadium: Stadion Kantrida; Referee: Zlatko Šimčić; Assistant referees: Miro Grgić, Dalibor Conjar

=== UEFA Champions League ===
==== Qualifying rounds ====
===== Second qualifying round =====
15 July 2014 First leg	Dinamo Zagreb (Croatia)	2–0	(Lithuania) Žalgiris	Zagreb, Croatia
20:45 CEST (UTC+2)	Čop (yellow card) 1'; M. Brozović (yellow card) 30'; Soudani 58'; Antolić 70'	Report	Kerla (yellow card) 28'; Adi (yellow card) 39'; Vaitkūnas (yellow card) 63'	Stadium: Stadion Maksimir; Attendance: 4,211; Referee: Anthony Taylor (England); Assistant referees: Stuart Burt (England), John Brooks (England); Fourth official: Craig Pawson (England)

22 July 2014 Second leg	Žalgiris (Lithuania)	0–2 (0–4 agg.)	(Croatia) Dinamo Zagreb	Vilnius, Lithuania
21:15 EEST (UTC+3)	Kerla (yellow card) 21'; Vaitkūnas (yellow card) 70'	Report	Ademi (yellow card) 11'; Soudani 46', (yellow card) 70'; Šimunić 49'; M. Brozović (yellow card) 60'	Stadium: LFF Stadium; Attendance: 4,000; Referee: Artyom Kuchin (Kazakhstan); Assistant referees: Sergei Vassyutin (Kazakhstan), Anatoli Hodin (Kazakhstan); Fourth official: Aleksandr Gauzer (Kazakhstan)
Note: Dinamo Zagreb won 4–0 on aggregate.

===== Third qualifying round =====
30 July 2014 First leg	AaB (Denmark)	0–1	(Croatia) Dinamo Zagreb	Aalborg, Denmark
20:15 CEST (UTC+2)		Report	Pivarić (yellow card) 33'; M. Brozović (yellow card) 49'	Stadium: Nordjyske Arena; Attendance: 9,438; Referee: Danny Makkelie (Netherlands); Assistant referees: Davie Goossens (Netherlands), Bas van Dongen (Netherlands); Fourth official: Martin Van Den Kerkhof (Netherlands)

6 August 2014 Second leg	Dinamo Zagreb (Croatia)	0–2 (1–2 agg.)	(Denmark) AaB	Zagreb, Croatia
20:45 CEST (UTC+2)		Report	Jacobsen 36', 85', (yellow card) 90+1'; Blåbjerg (yellow card) 73'	Stadium: Stadion Maksimir; Attendance: 8,235; Referee: Yevhen Aranovskyi (Ukraine); Assistant referees: Oleksandr Korniyko (Ukraine), Volodymyr Volodin (Ukraine); Fourth official: Sergiy Berezka (Ukraine)
Note: AaB won 2–1 on aggregate.

=== UEFA Europa League ===
==== Play-off round ====
21 August 2014 First leg	Petrolul Ploiești (Romania)	1–3	(Croatia) Dinamo Zagreb	Ploiești, Romania
20:15 EEST (UTC+3)	Alcénat (yellow card) 33'; Tamuz (yellow card) 45'; Alves (yellow card) 90+5'	Report	Čop 29' (pen.), 80'; Ademi (yellow card) 49'; Paulo Machado 90+6'	Stadium: Ilie Oană Stadium; Attendance: 13,460; Referee: Daniele Orsato (Italy); Assistant referees: Lorenzo Manganelli (Italy), Nicola Nicoletti (Italy); Fourth official: Daniele Doveri (Italy)

28 August 2014 Second leg	Dinamo Zagreb (Croatia)	2–1 (5–2 agg.)	(Romania) Petrolul Ploiești	Zagreb, Croatia
21:00 CEST (UTC+2)	Čop 22'; Šimunović (yellow card) 76'; M. Brozović (yellow card) 87'; Antolić (yellow card) 90', (goal) 90+5'	Report	De Lucas (yellow card) 36'; Albín 59'	Stadium: Stadion Maksimir; Attendance: 10,212; Referee: Ivan Kružliak (Slovakia); Assistant referees: Tomaš Somolani (Slovakia), Tomaš Mokoš (Slovakia); Fourth official: Peter Kralović (Slovakia)
Note: Dinamo Zagreb won 5–2 on aggregate.

==== Group stage ====
Pos	Team	Pld	W	D	L	GF	GA	GD	Pts	Qualification	SAL	CEL	DZG	AG
1	(Austria) Red Bull Salzburg	6	5	1	0	21	8	+13	16	Advance to knockout phase	—	2–2	4–2	5–1
2	(Scotland) Celtic	6	2	2	2	10	11	−1	8	Advance to knockout phase	1–3	—	1–0	2–1
3	(Croatia) Dinamo Zagreb	6	2	0	4	12	15	−3	6		1–5	4–3	—	5–1
4	(Romania) Astra Giurgiu	6	1	1	4	6	15	−9	4		1–2	1–1	1–0	—

Source: Soccerway
Rules for classification: Group stage tiebreakers

18 September 2014 1	Dinamo Zagreb (Croatia)	5–1	(Romania) Astra Giurgiu	Zagreb, Croatia
19:00 CEST (UTC+2)	Čop (yellow card) 5'; Soudani 17', 24', 45+1', (yellow card) 56'; Antolić (yellow card) 38'; Henríquez 70'; Ademi (yellow card) 90'; Ćorić 90+2'	Report	Oroș (yellow card) 36'; Chițu 82'; Pliatsikas (yellow card) 90'	Stadium: Stadion Maksimir; Attendance: 10,383; Referee: Leontios Trattou (Cyprus); Assistant referees: Michael Soteriou (Cyprus), Athinodoros Ioannou (Cyprus); Fourth official: Sotiris Viktoros (Cyprus); Goal-line assistants: Christos Nicolaides (Cyprus), Demetrios Masias (Cyprus)

2 October 2014 2	Celtic (Scotland)	1–0	(Croatia) Dinamo Zagreb	Glasgow, Scotland
20:05 BST (UTC+1)	Commons 6'; Denayer (yellow card) 86'; Stokes (yellow card) 90+3'	Report	Antolić (yellow card) 31'; Sigali (yellow card) 75'; Ademi (yellow card) 85'	Stadium: Celtic Park; Attendance: 28,132; Referee: Sébastien Delferiere (Belgium); Assistant referees: Yves De Neve (Belgium), Frederick Stalport (Belgium); Fourth official: Rien Vanyzere (Belgium); Goal-line assistants: Jonathan Lardot (Belgium), Bart Vertenten (Belgium)

23 October 2014 3	Red Bull Salzburg (Austria)	4–2	(Croatia) Dinamo Zagreb	Wals-Siezenheim, Austria
21:05 CEST (UTC+2)	Alan 14', 45', 52'; Ramalho 49'; Ilsanker (yellow card) 90+5'	Report	Sigali (yellow card) 44'; Ademi 81'; Vukojević (yellow card) 82'; Henríquez 89'	Stadium: Red Bull Arena; Attendance: 12,872; Referee: Serdar Gözübüyük (Netherlands); Assistant referees: Hessel Steegstra (Netherlands), Davie Goossen (Netherlands); Fourth official: Charles Schaap (Netherlands); Goal-line assistants: Dennis Higl (Netherlands), Jochem Kamphuis (Netherlands)

6 November 2014 4	Dinamo Zagreb (Croatia)	1–5	(Austria) Red Bull Salzburg	Zagreb, Croatia
19:00 CET (UTC+1)	Pinto (yellow card) 15'; M. Brozović (yellow card) 51'; Henríquez 60'; Ademi (yellow card) 76'; Šimunović (yellow card) 80'	Report	Soriano 39', 64', 85'; Kampl 59'; Bruno 72'; Ilsanker (yellow card) 50'; Ulmer (yellow card) 52'; Laimer (yellow card) 87'	Stadium: Stadion Maksimir; Attendance: 10,769; Referee: Michael Koukoulakis (Greece); Assistant referees: Michael Karsiotis (Greece), Christos Baltas (Greece); Fourth official: Chrysoula Kourompylia (Greece); Goal-line assistants: Andreas Pappas (Greece), Anastasios Papapetrou (Greece)

27 November 2014 5	Astra Giurgiu (Romania)	1–0	(Croatia) Dinamo Zagreb	Giurgiu, Romania
22:05 EET (UTC+2)	Rus (yellow card) 39'; Bukari 50'	Report	Vukojević (yellow card) 52'; Henríquez (yellow card) 60'; Čop (yellow card) 78'	Stadium: Marin Anastasovici Stadium; Attendance: 2,520; Referee: Sergey Lapochkin (Russia); Assistant referees: Nikolai Golubev (Russia), Aleksei Lebedev (Russia); Fourth official: Tikhon Kalugin (Russia); Goal-line assistants: Vitali Meshkov (Russia), Alexander Anatolyevich Yegorov (Russia)

11 December 2014 6	Dinamo Zagreb (Croatia)	4–3	(Scotland) Celtic	Zagreb, Croatia
19:00 CET (UTC+1)	Pjaca 14', 40', 50'; M. Brozović 48'	Report	Commons 23'; Šćepović 30', (yellow card) 30'; Izaguirre (yellow card) 35'; Pivarić 82' (o.g.)	Stadium: Stadion Maksimir; Attendance: 4,054; Referee: Gediminas Mažeika (Lithuania); Assistant referees: Vytautas Šimkus (Lithuania), Vytenis Kazlauska (Lithuania); Fourth official: Dovydas Sužiedėlis (Lithuania); Goal-line assistants: Nerijus Dunauskas (Lithuania), Sergejus Slyv (Lithuania)
