= 2014–15 UEFA Europa League qualifying =

Football tournament qualification stage

The 2014–15 UEFA Europa League qualifying phase and play-off round were played from 1 July to 28 August 2014. A total of 170 teams competed in the qualifying phase and play-off round to decide 31 of the 48 places in the group stage of the 2014–15 UEFA Europa League.

All times were CEST (UTC+2).

== Round and draw dates ==
All draws were held at UEFA headquarters in Nyon, Switzerland.

Round	Draw date and time	First leg	Second leg
First qualifying round	23 June 2014, 13:00 & 14:30	3 July 2014	10 July 2014
Second qualifying round	23 June 2014, 13:00 & 14:30	17 July 2014	24 July 2014
Third qualifying round	18 July 2014, 13:00	31 July 2014	7 August 2014
Play-off round	8 August 2014, 13:00	21 August 2014	28 August 2014

Matches may also be played on Tuesdays or Wednesdays instead of the regular Thursdays due to scheduling conflicts.

== Format ==
In the qualifying phase and play-off round, each tie was played over two legs, with each team playing one leg at home. The team that scored more goals on aggregate over the two legs advanced to the next round. If the aggregate score was level, the away goals rule was applied, i.e. the team that scored more goals away from home over the two legs advanced. If away goals were also equal, then 30 minutes of extra time were played. The away goals rule was again applied after extra time, i.e. if there were goals scored during extra time and the aggregate score was still level, the visiting team advanced by virtue of more away goals scored. If no goals were scored during extra time, the tie was decided by a penalty shoot-out.

In the draws for each round, teams were seeded based on their UEFA club coefficients at the beginning of the season, with the teams divided into seeded and unseeded pots. A seeded team was drawn against an unseeded team, with the order of legs in each tie decided randomly. Due to the limited time between matches, the draws for the second and third qualifying rounds took place before the results of the previous round were known. For these draws (or in any cases where the result of a tie in the previous round was not known at the time of the draw), the seeding was carried out under the assumption that the team with the higher coefficient of an undecided tie advanced to this round, which meant if the team with the lower coefficient was to advance, it simply took the seeding of its defeated opponent. Prior to the draws, UEFA could form "groups" in accordance with the principles set by the Club Competitions Committee, but they were purely for convenience of the draw and for ensuring that teams from the same association were not drawn against each other, and did not resemble any real groupings in the sense of the competition.

== Teams ==
A total of 170 teams were involved in the qualifying phase and play-off round (including 15 losers of the Champions League third qualifying round which entered the play-off round). The 31 winners of the play-off round advanced to the group stage to join the 7 automatic qualifiers and 10 losers of the Champions League play-off round.

Below were the participating teams (with their 2014 UEFA club coefficients), grouped by their starting rounds.

Key to colours
Winners of the play-off round advanced to the group stage

Play-off round
Team	Coeff
(Italy) Internazionale	95.387
(England) Tottenham Hotspur	75.949
(Spain) Villarreal	53.542
(Netherlands) Twente	50.862
(Ukraine) Metalist Kharkiv	45.693
(Greece) PAOK	37.720
(Ukraine) Dnipro Dnipropetrovsk	32.193
(Turkey) Trabzonspor	31.340
(Greece) Panathinaikos	30.220
(Czech Republic) Sparta Prague	28.870
(Germany) Borussia Mönchengladbach	25.328
(Croatia) Dinamo Zagreb	23.925
(Russia) Lokomotiv Moscow	20.899
(Austria) Rapid Wien	19.185
(Switzerland) Zürich	18.645
(Portugal) Nacional	17.959
(Israel) Maccabi Tel Aviv	17.875
(Moldova) Sheriff Tiraspol	17.075
(Poland) Legia Warsaw	15.275
(Serbia) Partizan	14.825
(Netherlands) Feyenoord	13.362
(France) Saint-Étienne	12.800
(Hungary) Debrecen	10.325
(Switzerland) Grasshopper	9.645
(Russia) Rostov	9.399
(Netherlands) PEC Zwolle	8.862
(Belgium) Lokeren	8.760
(Cyprus) Apollon Limassol	8.650
(Kazakhstan) Aktobe	8.150
(Cyprus) AEL Limassol	7.650
(Azerbaijan) Qarabağ	7.575
(Finland) HJK	7.435
(Denmark) Midtjylland	6.760

Third qualifying round
Team	Coeff
(France) Lyon	97.300
(Netherlands) PSV Eindhoven	64.862
(Czech Republic) Viktoria Plzeň	40.870
(Belgium) Club Brugge	32.260
(Spain) Real Sociedad	24.542
(Switzerland) Young Boys	24.145
(Germany) Mainz 05	17.328
(England) Hull City	16.949
(Ukraine) Chornomorets Odesa	16.193
(Italy) Torino	13.387
(Portugal) Rio Ave	12.459
(Russia) Dynamo Moscow	12.399
(Greece) Atromitos	9.720
(Denmark) Brøndby	8.260
(Israel) Ironi Kiryat Shmona	7.375
(Romania) Astra Giurgiu	6.951
(Turkey) Karabükspor	6.840
(Cyprus) Ermis Aradippou	4.650

Second qualifying round
Team	Coeff
(Israel) Hapoel Tel Aviv	31.375
(Romania) CFR Cluj	25.451
(Poland) Lech Poznań	17.275
(Czech Republic) Slovan Liberec	16.870
(Turkey) Bursaspor	15.840
(Denmark) Esbjerg	13.260
(Belgium) Zulte Waregem	12.260
(Sweden) IF Elfsborg	11.265
(Cyprus) Omonia	10.150
(Croatia) Hajduk Split	9.925
(Russia) Krasnodar	9.399
(Norway) Molde	9.355
(Switzerland) Luzern	9.145
(Bulgaria) CSKA Sofia	9.125
(Croatia) Rijeka	8.925
(Netherlands) Groningen	8.862
(Greece) Asteras Tripolis	8.720
(Scotland) Motherwell	8.313
(Ukraine) Zorya Luhansk	8.193
(Czech Republic) Mladá Boleslav	7.870
(Sweden) AIK	7.765
(Azerbaijan) Neftçi	7.075
(Romania) Petrolul Ploiești	6.951
(Serbia) Vojvodina	6.825
(Belarus) Dinamo Minsk	6.725
(Austria) Grödig	6.185
(Austria) St. Pölten	6.185
(Georgia (country)) Zestaponi	5.975
(Poland) Ruch Chorzów	5.775
(Bosnia and Herzegovina) Sarajevo	5.500
(Israel) Hapoel Be'er Sheva	5.375
(Belarus) Shakhtyor Soligorsk	5.225
(Hungary) Győri ETO	4.825
(Scotland) St Johnstone	4.813
(Poland) Zawisza Bydgoszcz	3.775
(Belarus) Neman Grodno	3.725
(Slovakia) Košice	3.700
(Serbia) Jagodina	3.575
(Slovakia) Trenčín	3.200
(Slovenia) Gorica	3.200
(Finland) RoPS	1.435

First qualifying round
Team	Coeff
(Norway) Rosenborg	11.355
(Norway) Tromsø	8.355
(Bulgaria) Litex Lovech	7.625
(Lithuania) Ekranas	7.050
(Iceland) FH	5.850
(Sweden) IFK Göteborg	5.765
(Bosnia and Herzegovina) Željezničar	5.500
(Kazakhstan) Shakhter Karagandy	5.400
(Slovakia) Spartak Trnava	5.200
(Luxembourg) Differdange 03	4.975
(Croatia) RNK Split	4.925
(Northern Ireland) Linfield	4.475
(Azerbaijan) Inter Baku	4.325
(Armenia) Pyunik	4.325
(Scotland) Aberdeen	4.313
(Bosnia and Herzegovina) Široki Brijeg	4.250
(Bulgaria) Botev Plovdiv	4.125
(Finland) Honka	3.935
(Republic of Ireland) Sligo Rovers	3.775
(Malta) Birkirkara	3.716
(Montenegro) Budućnost Podgorica	3.700
(Liechtenstein) Vaduz	3.650
(Slovenia) Koper	3.450
(Wales) Bangor City	3.350
(Sweden) IF Brommapojkarna	3.265
(Moldova) Zimbru Chișinău	3.075
(Finland) MYPA	2.935
(Norway) Haugesund	2.855
(Estonia) Nõmme Kalju	2.825
(Serbia) Čukarički	2.825
(Hungary) Ferencváros	2.825
(Latvia) Daugava Daugavpils	2.750
(Luxembourg) Jeunesse Esch	2.725
(Slovenia) Rudar Velenje	2.700
(Albania) Kukësi	2.600
(North Macedonia) Metalurg Skopje	2.550
(Republic of Ireland) Derry City	2.525
(Georgia (country)) Chikhura Sachkhere	2.475
(Albania) Flamurtari	2.350
(Moldova) Tiraspol	2.325
(Hungary) Diósgyőr	2.325
(North Macedonia) Shkëndija	2.300
(Luxembourg) Fola Esch	2.225
(Northern Ireland) Crusaders	2.225
(Andorra) Sant Julià	2.166
(Armenia) Shirak	2.075
(Moldova) Veris Chișinău	2.075
(Azerbaijan) Gabala	2.075
(Armenia) Mika	2.075
(Georgia (country)) Sioni Bolnisi	1.975
(Malta) Hibernians	1.966
(Malta) Sliema Wanderers	1.966
(Montenegro) Čelik Nikšić	1.950
(Kazakhstan) Astana	1.900
(Iceland) Fram	1.850
(Latvia) Jelgava	1.750
(Faroe Islands) Víkingur Gøta	1.675
(Kazakhstan) Kairat	1.650
(Albania) Laçi	1.600
(North Macedonia) Turnovo	1.550
(Republic of Ireland) Dundalk	1.525
(Finland) VPS	1.435
(Iceland) Stjarnan	1.350
(Lithuania) Banga	1.300
(Latvia) Daugava Rīga	1.250
(Montenegro) Lovćen Cetinje	1.200
(Faroe Islands) B36	1.175
(Andorra) UE Santa Coloma	1.166
(Estonia) Sillamäe Kalev	1.075
(Lithuania) Atlantas	1.050
(Faroe Islands) ÍF	0.925
(Wales) Airbus UK Broughton	0.850
(Northern Ireland) Glenavon	0.725
(San Marino) Libertas	0.699
(Wales) Aberystwyth Town	0.600
(Estonia) Santos Tartu	0.575
(San Marino) Folgore	0.199
(Gibraltar) College Europa	0.000

Notes

1. ^{CL-CR} Losers of the Champions League third qualifying round (Champions Route).
2. ^{CL-LR} Losers of the Champions League third qualifying round (League Route).

== First qualifying round ==
=== Seeding ===
A total of 78 teams played in the first qualifying round. The draw was held on 23 June 2014. Teams were pre-assigned numbers by UEFA so that the draw could be held in one run for all groups with ten teams and another run for all groups with twelve teams.

Group 1		Group 2		Group 3		Group 4	
Seeded	Unseeded	Seeded	Unseeded	Seeded	Unseeded	Seeded	Unseeded
(Slovakia) Spartak Trnava (2) (Azerbaijan) Inter Baku (1) (Slovenia) Koper (4) (Serbia) Čukarički (3) (Albania) Flamurtari (5)	(Moldova) Tiraspol (7) (Andorra) Sant Julià (6) (Georgia (country)) Sioni Bolnisi (9) (Malta) Hibernians (8) (Montenegro) Čelik Nikšić (10)	(Kazakhstan) Shakhter Karagandy (1) (Bosnia and Herzegovina) Široki Brijeg (2) (Malta) Birkirkara (3) (Liechtenstein) Vaduz (4) (Georgia (country)) Chikhura Sachkhere (5)	(Hungary) Diósgyőr (6) (Armenia) Shirak (7) (Azerbaijan) Gabala (8) (North Macedonia) Turnovo (9) (Gibraltar) College Europa (10)	(Bulgaria) Litex Lovech (5) (Croatia) RNK Split (4) (Montenegro) Budućnost Podgorica (3) (Albania) Kukësi (2) (North Macedonia) Metalurg Skopje (1)	(Moldova) Veris Chișinău (9) (Armenia) Mika (10) (Kazakhstan) Kairat (8) (Andorra) UE Santa Coloma (7) (San Marino) Folgore (6)	(Bosnia and Herzegovina) Željezničar (3) (Armenia) Pyunik (2) (Bulgaria) Botev Plovdiv (1) (Moldova) Zimbru Chișinău (4) (Hungary) Ferencváros (6) (Slovenia) Rudar Velenje (5)	(North Macedonia) Shkëndija (9) (Malta) Sliema Wanderers (8) (Kazakhstan) Astana (7) (Albania) Laçi (11) (Montenegro) Lovćen Cetinje (10) (San Marino) Libertas (12)
Group 5		Group 6		Group 7			
Seeded	Unseeded	Seeded	Unseeded	Seeded	Unseeded		
(Norway) Rosenborg (2) (Luxembourg) Differdange 03 (1) (Northern Ireland) Linfield (4) (Sweden) IF Brommapojkarna (3) (Estonia) Nõmme Kalju (6) (Republic of Ireland) Derry City (5)	(Iceland) Fram (8) (Latvia) Jelgava (7) (Finland) VPS (10) (Faroe Islands) B36 (9) (Lithuania) Atlantas (12) (Wales) Aberystwyth Town (11)	(Norway) Tromsø (3) (Lithuania) Ekranas (4) (Scotland) Aberdeen (1) (Wales) Bangor City (6) (Finland) MYPA (5) (Luxembourg) Jeunesse Esch (2)	(Northern Ireland) Crusaders (9) (Republic of Ireland) Dundalk (7) (Iceland) Stjarnan (8) (Latvia) Daugava Rīga (12) (Faroe Islands) ÍF (11) (Estonia) Santos Tartu (10)	(Iceland) FH (1) (Sweden) IFK Göteborg (2) (Finland) Honka (3) (Republic of Ireland) Sligo Rovers (4) (Norway) Haugesund (5) (Latvia) Daugava Daugavpils (6)	(Luxembourg) Fola Esch (7) (Faroe Islands) Víkingur Gøta (8) (Lithuania) Banga (9) (Estonia) Sillamäe Kalev (10) (Wales) Airbus UK Broughton (11) (Northern Ireland) Glenavon (12)		

=== Summary ===
The first legs were played on 1 and 3 July, and the second legs were played on 8, 10 and 11 July 2014.

Team 1	Agg.	Team 2	1st leg	2nd leg
Sioni Bolnisi (Georgia (country))	4–4 (a)	(Albania) Flamurtari	2–3	2–1
Tiraspol (Moldova)	3–6	(Azerbaijan) Inter Baku	2–3	1–3
Hibernians (Malta)	2–9	(Slovakia) Spartak Trnava	2–4	0–5
Čukarički (Serbia)	4–0 (Note: Order of legs reversed after original draw.)	(Andorra) Sant Julià	4–0	0–0
Čelik Nikšić (Montenegro)	0–9	(Slovenia) Koper	0–5	0–4
Turnovo (North Macedonia)	1–4	(Georgia (country)) Chikhura Sachkhere	0–1	1–3
Shirak (Armenia)	1–6	(Kazakhstan) Shakhter Karagandy	1–2	0–4
Gabala (Azerbaijan)	0–5	(Bosnia and Herzegovina) Široki Brijeg	0–2	0–3
Diósgyőr (Hungary)	6–2	(Malta) Birkirkara	2–1	4–1
Vaduz (Liechtenstein)	4–0	(Gibraltar) College Europa	3–0	1–0
Veris Chișinău (Moldova)	0–3	(Bulgaria) Litex Lovech	0–0	0–3
UE Santa Coloma (Andorra)	0–5	(North Macedonia) Metalurg Skopje	0–3	0–2
Kairat (Kazakhstan)	1–0	(Albania) Kukësi	1–0	0–0
Folgore (San Marino)	1–5	(Montenegro) Budućnost Podgorica	1–2	0–3
RNK Split (Croatia)	3–1	(Armenia) Mika	2–0	1–1
Botev Plovdiv (Bulgaria)	6–0	(San Marino) Libertas	4–0	2–0
Željezničar (Bosnia and Herzegovina)	1–0	(Montenegro) Lovćen Cetinje	0–0	1–0
Shkëndija (North Macedonia)	2–3	(Moldova) Zimbru Chișinău	2–1	0–2
Sliema Wanderers (Malta)	2–3	(Hungary) Ferencváros	1–1	1–2
Pyunik (Armenia)	1–6	(Kazakhstan) Astana	1–4	0–2
Rudar Velenje (Slovenia)	2–2 (2–3 p)	(Albania) Laçi	1–1	1–1 (a.e.t.)
Differdange 03 (Luxembourg)	2–3	(Lithuania) Atlantas	1–0	1–3
VPS (Finland)	2–3	(Sweden) IF Brommapojkarna	2–1	0–2
B36 (Faroe Islands)	2–3	(Northern Ireland) Linfield	1–2	1–1
Fram (Iceland)	2–3	(Estonia) Nõmme Kalju	0–1	2–2
Rosenborg (Norway)	6–0	(Latvia) Jelgava	4–0	2–0
Derry City (Republic of Ireland)	9–0	(Wales) Aberystwyth Town	4–0	5–0
Aberdeen (Scotland)	8–0	(Latvia) Daugava Rīga	5–0	3–0
Santos Tartu (Estonia)	1–13	(Norway) Tromsø	0–7	1–6
Crusaders (Northern Ireland)	5–2	(Lithuania) Ekranas	3–1	2–1
Stjarnan (Iceland)	8–0	(Wales) Bangor City	4–0	4–0
Jeunesse Esch (Luxembourg)	1–5	(Republic of Ireland) Dundalk	0–2	1–3
MYPA (Finland)	1–0	(Faroe Islands) ÍF	1–0	0–0
FH (Iceland)	6–2	(Northern Ireland) Glenavon	3–0	3–2
Sillamäe Kalev (Estonia)	4–4 (a)	(Finland) Honka	2–1	2–3 (a.e.t.)
Banga (Lithuania)	0–4	(Republic of Ireland) Sligo Rovers	0–0	0–4
Víkingur Gøta (Faroe Islands)	3–2	(Latvia) Daugava Daugavpils	2–1	1–1
IFK Göteborg (Sweden)	2–0	(Luxembourg) Fola Esch	0–0	2–0
Airbus UK Broughton (Wales)	2–3	(Norway) Haugesund	1–1	1–2

== Second qualifying round ==
=== Seeding ===
A total of 80 teams played in the second qualifying round: 41 teams which entered in this round, and the 39 winners of the first qualifying round. The draw was held on 23 June 2014. Teams were pre-assigned numbers by UEFA so that the draw could be held in one run for all groups.

Group 1		Group 2		Group 3		Group 4	
Seeded	Unseeded	Seeded	Unseeded	Seeded	Unseeded	Seeded	Unseeded
(Poland) Lech Poznań (4) (Norway) Molde (5) (Belarus) Dinamo Minsk (3) (Sweden) IFK Göteborg (1) (Bosnia and Herzegovina) Željezničar (2)	(Hungary) Győri ETO (7) (Slovenia) Gorica (9) (Finland) MYPA (8) (Estonia) Nõmme Kalju (6) (North Macedonia) Metalurg Skopje (10)	(Czech Republic) Slovan Liberec (2) (Norway) Tromsø (4) (Romania) Petrolul Ploiești (3) (Iceland) FH (1) (Israel) Hapoel Be'er Sheva (5)	(Croatia) RNK Split (9) (Belarus) Neman Grodno (7) (Slovakia) Košice (10) (Faroe Islands) Víkingur Gøta (6) (Albania) Flamurtari (8)	(Romania) CFR Cluj (5) (Scotland) Motherwell (2) (Northern Ireland) Crusaders (3) (Austria) Grödig (1) (Georgia (country)) Zestaponi (4)	(Slovakia) Spartak Trnava (6) (Serbia) Jagodina (9) (Iceland) Stjarnan (10) (Sweden) IF Brommapojkarna (8) (Serbia) Čukarički (7)	(Turkey) Bursaspor (5) (Croatia) Rijeka (3) (Netherlands) Groningen (1) (Sweden) AIK (4) (Azerbaijan) Neftçi (2)	(Northern Ireland) Linfield (6) (Scotland) Aberdeen (7) (Slovenia) Koper (10) (Hungary) Ferencváros (8) (Georgia (country)) Chikhura Sachkhere (9)
Group 5		Group 6		Group 7		Group 8	
Seeded	Unseeded	Seeded	Unseeded	Seeded	Unseeded	Seeded	Unseeded
(Norway) Rosenborg (3) (Cyprus) Omonia (1) (Switzerland) Luzern (2) (Ukraine) Zorya Luhansk (4) (Czech Republic) Mladá Boleslav (5)	(Scotland) St Johnstone (10) (Bosnia and Herzegovina) Široki Brijeg (9) (Republic of Ireland) Sligo Rovers (8) (Montenegro) Budućnost Podgorica (7) (Albania) Laçi (6)	(Belgium) Zulte Waregem (2) (Russia) Krasnodar (4) (Bulgaria) CSKA Sofia (3) (Bosnia and Herzegovina) Sarajevo (5) (Kazakhstan) Shakhter Karagandy (1)	(Lithuania) Atlantas (7) (Estonia) Sillamäe Kalev (6) (Poland) Zawisza Bydgoszcz (10) (Moldova) Zimbru Chișinău (8) (Norway) Haugesund (9)	(Israel) Hapoel Tel Aviv (2) (Bulgaria) Litex Lovech (3) (Serbia) Vojvodina (4) (Poland) Ruch Chorzów (5) (Belarus) Shakhtyor Soligorsk (1)	(Kazakhstan) Astana (10) (Hungary) Diósgyőr (8) (Liechtenstein) Vaduz (9) (Slovakia) Trenčín (6) (Republic of Ireland) Derry City (7)	(Denmark) Esbjerg (4) (Sweden) IF Elfsborg (3) (Croatia) Hajduk Split (2) (Greece) Asteras Tripolis (5) (Austria) St. Pölten (1)	(Azerbaijan) Inter Baku (8) (Bulgaria) Botev Plovdiv (7) (Republic of Ireland) Dundalk (10) (Kazakhstan) Kairat (6) (Finland) RoPS (9)

Notes

1. ^{†} Winners of the first qualifying round, whose identity was not known at the time of the draw. Teams in italics defeated a team with a higher coefficient in the first qualifying round, thus effectively taking the coefficient of their defeated opponent in the draw for the second qualifying round.

=== Summary ===
The first legs were played on 17 July, and the second legs were played on 22 and 24 July 2014.

Team 1	Agg.	Team 2	1st leg	2nd leg
Győri ETO (Hungary)	1–3	(Sweden) IFK Göteborg	0–3	1–0
Molde (Norway)	5–2	(Slovenia) Gorica	4–1	1–1
Metalurg Skopje (North Macedonia)	2–2 (a) (Note: Order of legs reversed after original draw.)	(Bosnia and Herzegovina) Željezničar	0–0	2–2
Nõmme Kalju (Estonia)	1–3	(Poland) Lech Poznań	1–0	0–3
Dinamo Minsk (Belarus)	3–0	(Finland) MYPA	3–0	0–0
Neman Grodno (Belarus)	1–3	(Iceland) FH	1–1	0–2
RNK Split (Croatia)	2–1 (Note: Order of legs reversed after original draw, due to the 2014 Israel–Gaza conflict.)	(Israel) Hapoel Be'er Sheva	2–1	0–0
Košice (Slovakia)	0–4	(Czech Republic) Slovan Liberec	0–1	0–3
Víkingur Gøta (Faroe Islands)	2–1	(Norway) Tromsø	0–0	2–1
Petrolul Ploiești (Romania)	5–1	(Albania) Flamurtari	2–0	3–1
Čukarički (Serbia)	2–5	(Austria) Grödig	0–4	2–1
CFR Cluj (Romania)	1–0	(Serbia) Jagodina	0–0	1–0
Motherwell (Scotland)	4–5	(Iceland) Stjarnan	2–2	2–3 (a.e.t.)
Zestaponi (Georgia (country))	0–3	(Slovakia) Spartak Trnava	0–0	0–3
IF Brommapojkarna (Sweden)	5–1	(Northern Ireland) Crusaders	4–0	1–1
Aberdeen (Scotland)	2–1	(Netherlands) Groningen	0–0	2–1
Bursaspor (Turkey)	0–0 (1–4 p)	(Georgia (country)) Chikhura Sachkhere	0–0	0–0 (a.e.t.)
Neftçi (Azerbaijan)	3–2	(Slovenia) Koper	1–2	2–0
Linfield (Northern Ireland)	1–2	(Sweden) AIK	1–0	0–2
Rijeka (Croatia)	3–1	(Hungary) Ferencváros	1–0	2–1
Budućnost Podgorica (Montenegro)	0–2	(Cyprus) Omonia	0–2	0–0
Mladá Boleslav (Czech Republic)	6–1	(Bosnia and Herzegovina) Široki Brijeg	2–1	4–0
Luzern (Switzerland)	2–2 (4–5 p)	(Scotland) St Johnstone	1–1	1–1 (a.e.t.)
Laçi (Albania)	1–5	(Ukraine) Zorya Luhansk	0–3	1–2
Rosenborg (Norway)	4–3	(Republic of Ireland) Sligo Rovers	1–2	3–1
Atlantas (Lithuania)	0–3	(Kazakhstan) Shakhter Karagandy	0–0	0–3
Sarajevo (Bosnia and Herzegovina)	3–2	(Norway) Haugesund	0–1	3–1
Zulte Waregem (Belgium)	5–2	(Poland) Zawisza Bydgoszcz	2–1	3–1
Sillamäe Kalev (Estonia)	0–9	(Russia) Krasnodar	0–4	0–5
CSKA Sofia (Bulgaria)	1–1 (a)	(Moldova) Zimbru Chișinău	1–1	0–0
Derry City (Republic of Ireland)	1–6	(Belarus) Shakhtyor Soligorsk	0–1	1–5
Ruch Chorzów (Poland)	3–2	(Liechtenstein) Vaduz	3–2	0–0
Astana (Kazakhstan)	3–1	(Israel) Hapoel Tel Aviv	3–0	0–1
Trenčín (Slovakia)	4–3	(Serbia) Vojvodina	4–0	0–3
Litex Lovech (Bulgaria)	2–3	(Hungary) Diósgyőr	0–2	2–1
Botev Plovdiv (Bulgaria)	2–3	(Austria) St. Pölten	2–1	0–2
RoPS (Finland)	3–5	(Greece) Asteras Tripolis	1–1	2–4
Dundalk (Republic of Ireland)	2–3	(Croatia) Hajduk Split	0–2	2–1
Kairat (Kazakhstan)	1–2	(Denmark) Esbjerg	1–1	0–1
IF Elfsborg (Sweden)	1–1 (4–3 p)	(Azerbaijan) Inter Baku	0–1	1–0 (a.e.t.)

== Third qualifying round ==
=== Seeding ===
A total of 58 teams played in the third qualifying round: 18 teams which entered in this round, and the 40 winners of the second qualifying round. The draw was held on 18 July 2014. Teams were pre-assigned numbers by UEFA so that the draw could be held in one run for all groups with twelve teams and another run for all groups with ten teams.

Group 1		Group 2		Group 3	
Seeded	Unseeded	Seeded	Unseeded	Seeded	Unseeded
(France) Lyon (5) (Germany) Mainz 05 (6) (Ukraine) Chornomorets Odesa (1) (Norway) Rosenborg (3) (Russia) Krasnodar (4) (Scotland) St Johnstone (2)	(Greece) Asteras Tripolis (12) (Czech Republic) Mladá Boleslav (7) (Hungary) Diósgyőr (8) (Turkey) Karabükspor (11) (Slovakia) Spartak Trnava (10) (Croatia) RNK Split (9)	(Netherlands) PSV Eindhoven (6) (Poland) Lech Poznań (4) (England) Hull City (3) (Italy) Torino (2) (Cyprus) Omonia (1) (Norway) Molde (5)	(Iceland) Stjarnan (8) (Ukraine) Zorya Luhansk (7) (Slovakia) Trenčín (11) (Austria) St. Pölten (12) (North Macedonia) Metalurg Skopje (9) (Sweden) IF Brommapojkarna (10)	(Kazakhstan) Astana (2) (Spain) Real Sociedad (1) (Czech Republic) Slovan Liberec (5) (Belgium) Zulte Waregem (6) (Greece) Atromitos (3) (Moldova) Zimbru Chișinău (4)	(Scotland) Aberdeen (9) (Sweden) AIK (10) (Romania) Astra Giurgiu (7) (Austria) Grödig (8) (Bosnia and Herzegovina) Sarajevo (11) (Belarus) Shakhtyor Soligorsk (12)
Group 4		Group 5			
Seeded	Unseeded	Seeded	Unseeded		
(Czech Republic) Viktoria Plzeň (4) (Switzerland) Young Boys (2) (Denmark) Esbjerg (3) (Russia) Dynamo Moscow (1) (Sweden) IF Elfsborg (6) (Croatia) Rijeka (5)	(Faroe Islands) Víkingur Gøta (7) (Israel) Ironi Kiryat Shmona (9) (Romania) Petrolul Ploiești (8) (Iceland) FH (12) (Poland) Ruch Chorzów (11) (Cyprus) Ermis Aradippou (10)	(Belgium) Club Brugge (5) (Romania) CFR Cluj (2) (Georgia (country)) Chikhura Sachkhere (4) (Portugal) Rio Ave (3) (Croatia) Hajduk Split (1)	(Denmark) Brøndby (10) (Azerbaijan) Neftçi (8) (Belarus) Dinamo Minsk (7) (Sweden) IFK Göteborg (6) (Kazakhstan) Shakhter Karagandy (9)		

Notes

1. ^{†} Winners of the second qualifying round, whose identity was not known at the time of the draw. Teams in italics defeated a team with a higher coefficient in the second qualifying round, thus effectively taking the coefficient of their defeated opponent in the draw for the third qualifying round.

=== Summary ===
The first legs were played on 31 July, and the second legs were played on 7 August 2014.

Team 1	Agg.	Team 2	1st leg	2nd leg
Karabükspor (Turkey)	1–1 (a)	(Norway) Rosenborg	0–0	1–1
RNK Split (Croatia)	2–0 (Note: Order of legs reversed after original draw.)	(Ukraine) Chornomorets Odesa	2–0	0–0
St Johnstone (Scotland)	2–3	(Slovakia) Spartak Trnava	1–2	1–1
Mainz 05 (Germany)	2–3	(Greece) Asteras Tripolis	1–0	1–3
Diósgyőr (Hungary)	1–8	(Russia) Krasnodar	1–5	0–3
Mladá Boleslav (Czech Republic)	2–6	(France) Lyon	1–4	1–2
Trenčín (Slovakia)	1–2	(England) Hull City	0–0	1–2
Omonia (Cyprus)	4–0	(North Macedonia) Metalurg Skopje	3–0	1–0
IF Brommapojkarna (Sweden)	0–7	(Italy) Torino	0–3	0–4
PSV Eindhoven (Netherlands)	4–2	(Austria) St. Pölten	1–0	3–2
Stjarnan (Iceland)	1–0	(Poland) Lech Poznań	1–0	0–0
Zorya Luhansk (Ukraine)	3–2	(Norway) Molde	1–1	2–1
Sarajevo (Bosnia and Herzegovina)	4–3	(Greece) Atromitos	1–2	3–1 (a.e.t.)
Real Sociedad (Spain)	5–2	(Scotland) Aberdeen	2–0	3–2
Astana (Kazakhstan)	4–1	(Sweden) AIK	1–1	3–0
Zulte Waregem (Belgium)	4–7	(Belarus) Shakhtyor Soligorsk	2–5	2–2
Grödig (Austria)	2–2 (a)	(Moldova) Zimbru Chișinău	1–2	1–0
Astra Giurgiu (Romania)	6–2	(Czech Republic) Slovan Liberec	3–0	3–2
Ruch Chorzów (Poland)	2–2 (a)	(Denmark) Esbjerg	0–0	2–2
Dynamo Moscow (Russia)	3–2	(Israel) Ironi Kiryat Shmona	1–1	2–1
Young Boys (Switzerland)	3–0	(Cyprus) Ermis Aradippou	1–0	2–0
IF Elfsborg (Sweden)	5–3	(Iceland) FH	4–1	1–2
Petrolul Ploiești (Romania)	5–2	(Czech Republic) Viktoria Plzeň	1–1	4–1
Víkingur Gøta (Faroe Islands)	1–9	(Croatia) Rijeka	1–5	0–4
Dinamo Minsk (Belarus)	3–0	(Romania) CFR Cluj	1–0	2–0
Neftçi (Azerbaijan)	3–2	(Georgia (country)) Chikhura Sachkhere	0–0	3–2
IFK Göteborg (Sweden)	0–1	(Portugal) Rio Ave	0–1	0–0
Club Brugge (Belgium)	5–0	(Denmark) Brøndby	3–0	2–0
Shakhter Karagandy (Kazakhstan)	4–5	(Croatia) Hajduk Split	4–2	0–3

== Play-off round ==
=== Seeding ===
A total of 62 teams played in the play-off round: 18 teams which entered in this round, the 29 winners of the third qualifying round, and the 15 losers of the Champions League third qualifying round. The draw was held on 8 August 2014. Teams were pre-assigned numbers by UEFA so that the draw could be held in one run for all groups with ten teams and another run for all groups with twelve teams.

Group 1		Group 2		Group 3	
Seeded	Unseeded	Seeded	Unseeded	Seeded	Unseeded
(Spain) Villarreal (4) (Czech Republic) Sparta Prague (3) (Germany) Borussia Mönchengladbach (2) (Switzerland) Young Boys (5) (Russia) Lokomotiv Moscow (1)	(Hungary) Debrecen (10) (Netherlands) PEC Zwolle (8) (Cyprus) Apollon Limassol (7) (Bosnia and Herzegovina) Sarajevo (6) (Kazakhstan) Astana (9)	(England) Tottenham Hotspur (4) (Ukraine) Dnipro Dnipropetrovsk (5) (Switzerland) Zürich (2) (Portugal) Nacional (3) (Israel) Maccabi Tel Aviv (1)	(Croatia) Hajduk Split (10) (Greece) Asteras Tripolis (7) (Cyprus) AEL Limassol (9) (Belarus) Dinamo Minsk (8) (Slovakia) Spartak Trnava (6)	(Netherlands) Twente (2) (Greece) PAOK (3) (Turkey) Trabzonspor (5) (Croatia) Dinamo Zagreb (1) (Austria) Rapid Wien (4)	(Russia) Rostov (10) (Azerbaijan) Qarabağ (6) (Finland) HJK (9) (Romania) Petrolul Ploiești (7) (Moldova) Zimbru Chișinău (8)
Group 4		Group 5		Group 6	
Seeded	Unseeded	Seeded	Unseeded	Seeded	Unseeded
(France) Lyon (5) (England) Hull City (3) (Poland) Legia Warsaw (4) (Italy) Torino (2) (Russia) Dynamo Moscow (1)	(Cyprus) Omonia (7) (Belgium) Lokeren (8) (Kazakhstan) Aktobe (9) (Romania) Astra Giurgiu (10) (Croatia) RNK Split (6)	(Netherlands) PSV Eindhoven (5) (Ukraine) Metalist Kharkiv (1) (Serbia) Partizan (2) (France) Saint-Étienne (3) (Portugal) Rio Ave (4)	(Sweden) IF Elfsborg (9) (Azerbaijan) Neftçi (6) (Turkey) Karabükspor (8) (Poland) Ruch Chorzów (7) (Belarus) Shakhtyor Soligorsk (10)	(Italy) Internazionale (2) (Belgium) Club Brugge (6) (Greece) Panathinaikos (5) (Spain) Real Sociedad (3) (Moldova) Sheriff Tiraspol (4) (Netherlands) Feyenoord (1)	(Switzerland) Grasshopper (10) (Russia) Krasnodar (12) (Croatia) Rijeka (9) (Ukraine) Zorya Luhansk (11) (Denmark) Midtjylland (8) (Iceland) Stjarnan (7)

Notes

1. ^{†} Winners of the third qualifying round.
2. ^{CL} Losers of the Champions League third qualifying round.

=== Summary ===
The first legs were played on 20 and 21 August, and the second legs were played on 28 August 2014.

Team 1	Agg.	Team 2	1st leg	2nd leg
Sarajevo (Bosnia and Herzegovina)	2–10	(Germany) Borussia Mönchengladbach	2–3	0–7
Apollon Limassol (Cyprus)	5–2	(Russia) Lokomotiv Moscow	1–1	4–1
Astana (Kazakhstan)	0–7	(Spain) Villarreal	0–3	0–4
Young Boys (Switzerland)	3–1	(Hungary) Debrecen	3–1	0–0
PEC Zwolle (Netherlands)	2–4	(Czech Republic) Sparta Prague	1–1	1–3
Spartak Trnava (Slovakia)	2–4	(Switzerland) Zürich	1–3	1–1
Asteras Tripolis (Greece)	3–3 (a)	(Israel) Maccabi Tel Aviv	2–0	1–3
AEL Limassol (Cyprus)	1–5	(England) Tottenham Hotspur	1–2	0–3
Dnipro Dnipropetrovsk (Ukraine)	2–1	(Croatia) Hajduk Split	2–1	0–0
Dinamo Minsk (Belarus)	5–2	(Portugal) Nacional	2–0	3–2
Qarabağ (Azerbaijan)	1–1 (a)	(Netherlands) Twente	0–0	1–1
Petrolul Ploiești (Romania)	2–5	(Croatia) Dinamo Zagreb	1–3	1–2
HJK (Finland)	5–4	(Austria) Rapid Wien	2–1	3–3
Trabzonspor (Turkey)	2–0	(Russia) Rostov	2–0	0–0
Zimbru Chișinău (Moldova)	1–4	(Greece) PAOK	1–0	0–4
RNK Split (Croatia)	0–1	(Italy) Torino	0–0	0–1
Dynamo Moscow (Russia)	4–3 (Note: Order of legs reversed after original draw.)	(Cyprus) Omonia	2–2	2–1
Aktobe (Kazakhstan)	0–3	(Poland) Legia Warsaw	0–1	0–2
Lyon (France)	2–2 (a)	(Romania) Astra Giurgiu	1–2	1–0
Lokeren (Belgium)	2–2 (a)	(England) Hull City	1–0	1–2
Partizan (Serbia)	5–3	(Azerbaijan) Neftçi	3–2	2–1
Ruch Chorzów (Poland)	0–1	(Ukraine) Metalist Kharkiv	0–0	0–1 (a.e.t.)
IF Elfsborg (Sweden)	2–2 (a)	(Portugal) Rio Ave	2–1	0–1
PSV Eindhoven (Netherlands)	3–0	(Belarus) Shakhtyor Soligorsk	1–0	2–0
Karabükspor (Turkey)	1–1 (3–4 p)	(France) Saint-Étienne	1–0	0–1 (a.e.t.)
Stjarnan (Iceland)	0–9	(Italy) Internazionale	0–3	0–6
Panathinaikos (Greece)	6–2	(Denmark) Midtjylland	4–1	2–1
Zorya Luhansk (Ukraine)	4–5	(Netherlands) Feyenoord	1–1	3–4
Grasshopper (Switzerland)	1–3	(Belgium) Club Brugge	1–2	0–1
Real Sociedad (Spain)	1–3	(Russia) Krasnodar	1–0	0–3
Rijeka (Croatia)	4–0	(Moldova) Sheriff Tiraspol	1–0	3–0

== Statistics ==
There were 737 goals in 278 matches in the qualifying phase and play-off round, for an average of 2.65 goals per match.

=== Top goalscorers ===
Rank	Player	Team	Goals	Minutes played
1	(Republic of Ireland) Adam Rooney	(Scotland) Aberdeen	6	425
2	(Sweden) Branimir Hrgota	(Germany) Borussia Mönchengladbach	5	180
2	(Slovakia) Erik Sabo	(Slovakia) Spartak Trnava	5	540
2	(Iceland) Ólafur Karl Finsen	(Iceland) Stjarnan	5	677
5	(Sweden) Marcus Berg	(Greece) Panathinaikos	4	90
5	(Nigeria) Kehinde Fatai	(Romania) Astra Giurgiu	4	242
5	(North Macedonia) Adis Jahović	(Croatia) Rijeka	4	264
5	(Brazil) Ari	(Russia) Krasnodar	4	292
5	(Spain) Daniel Segovia	(Austria) St. Pölten	4	329
5	(Northern Ireland) Rory Patterson	(Republic of Ireland) Derry City	4	341
5	(Norway) Magnus Andersen	(Norway) Tromsø	4	346
5	(Iceland) Atli Guðnason	(Iceland) FH	4	476
5	(Denmark) Mike Jensen	(Norway) Rosenborg	4	476
5	(Georgia (country)) Giorgi Gabedava	(Georgia (country)) Chikhura Sachkhere	4	560

Source: UEFA.com

=== Top assists ===
Rank	Player	Team	Assists	Minutes played
1	(Norway) Thomas Drage	(Norway) Tromsø	4	353
1	(Sweden) Johan Larsson	(Sweden) IF Elfsborg	4	436
1	(Brazil) Joãozinho	(Russia) Krasnodar	4	437
1	(Austria) Mihret Topčagić	(Kazakhstan) Shakhter Karagandy	4	501
1	(Portugal) Cristóvão	(Cyprus) Omonia	4	514
1	(Belarus) Ihar Stasevich	(Belarus) Dinamo Minsk	4	518
1	(Portugal) Filipe Teixeira	(Romania) Petrolul Ploiești	4	533
1	(Kazakhstan) Georgy Zhukov	(Kazakhstan) Astana	4	618

Source: UEFA.com
