= Marko Mikulic =

Croatian footballer (born 1994)

Marko Mikulić
Personal information
- Full name: Marko Mikulić
- Date of birth: 30 January 1994 (age 32)
- Place of birth: Zagreb, Croatia
- Height: 1.85 m (6 ft 1 in)
- Position: Goalkeeper

Team information
- Current team: Obreš
- Number: 12

Youth career
- Dinamo Zagreb

Senior career*
Years	Team	Apps	(Gls)
2013–2020	Dinamo Zagreb	0	(0)
2015–2017	Dinamo Zagreb II	14	(0)
2016	→ Lokomotiva (loan)	1	(0)
2018–2020	→ Sesvete (loan)	22	(0)
2020	FC Mauerwerk	4	(0)
2021	Sesvete	9	(0)
2021	Drava Ptuj	3	(0)
2021–	Obreš	73	(0)
- * Club domestic league appearances and goals as of 01:11, 23 June 2024 (UTC)

Marko Mikulić (born 30 January 1994 in Croatia) is a Croatian footballer, who currently plays for Obreš Sveti Ilija.

== Career ==
Mikulić had a spell at Austrian Regionalliga side FC Mauerwerk.
