= Ivan Kušek Apaš City Stadium =

Football stadium in Koprivnica, Croatia

Coordinates: 46°9′58″N 16°50′5″E

- Gradski Stadion Ivan Kušek-Apaš
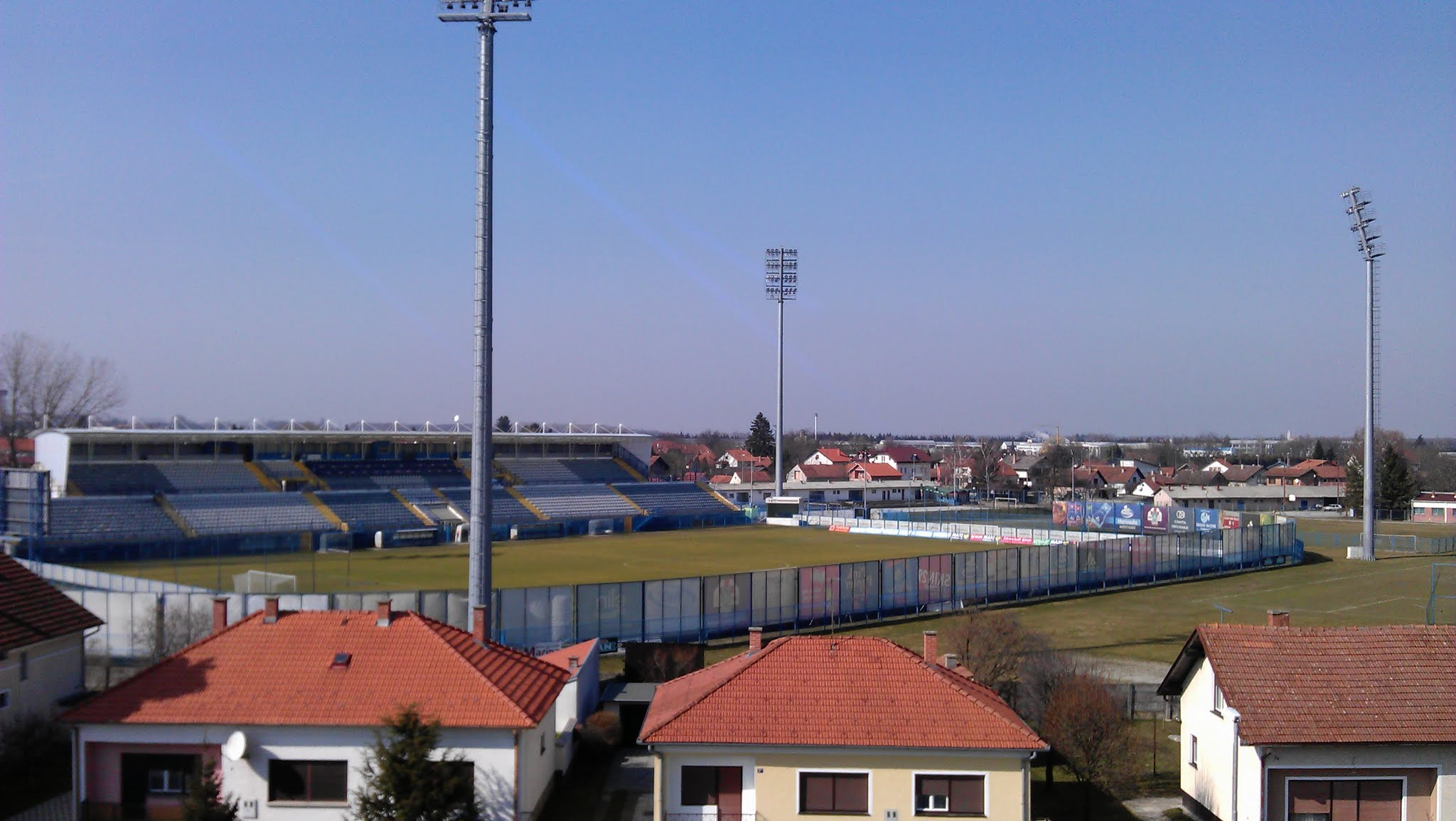
- Former names: Gradski Stadion
- Location: Koprivnica, Croatia
- Capacity: 3,134
- Surface: Hybrid grass

Tenants
- NK Slaven Belupo; NK Koprivnica

Ivan Kušek Apaš City Stadium (Croatian: Gradski Stadion Ivan Kušek Apaš) is a football stadium in Koprivnica, Croatia. It serves as home ground for NK Slaven Belupo football club. The stadium has a capacity of 3,134 seats. In May 2007, city of Koprivnica (which is the owner) had finished putting up floodlights, so that domestic league and UEFA Europa League games could be played at night.

== Plans ==
There are plans for building luxury suites for journalists and VIP`s on the western grandstand as well as building a permanent roof on the grandstand because the one that is here now is only temporary.

== International matches ==
Date	Competition	Teams	Score
10 October 2000	UEFA European Under-21 (Qualifying group stage)	Croatia vs. Scotland	3–1
7 June 2009	UEFA European Under-21 (Qualifying group stage)	Croatia vs. Cyprus	0–2
3 September 2015	UEFA European Under-21 (Qualifying group stage)	Croatia vs. Georgia	1–0
27 May 2016	Friendly	Croatia vs. Moldova	1–0
6 June 2016	UEFA Women's EURO (Qualifying group stage)	Croatia vs. Russia	0–3
1 September 2016	UEFA European Under-21 (Qualifying group stage)	Croatia vs. Sweden	1–1
