= 2014–15 UEFA Europa League qualifying (third and play-off round matches) =

European football competition

This page summarises the matches of the third qualifying and play-off rounds of 2014–15 UEFA Europa League qualifying.

Times are CEST (UTC+2), as listed by UEFA (local times, if different, are in parentheses).

== Third qualifying round ==
=== Summary ===
The first legs were played on 31 July, and the second legs were played on 7 August 2014.

Team 1	Agg.	Team 2	1st leg	2nd leg
Karabükspor (Turkey)	1–1 (a)	(Norway) Rosenborg	0–0	1–1
RNK Split (Croatia)	2–0 (Note: Order of legs reversed after original draw.)	(Ukraine) Chornomorets Odesa	2–0	0–0
St Johnstone (Scotland)	2–3	(Slovakia) Spartak Trnava	1–2	1–1
Mainz 05 (Germany)	2–3	(Greece) Asteras Tripolis	1–0	1–3
Diósgyőr (Hungary)	1–8	(Russia) Krasnodar	1–5	0–3
Mladá Boleslav (Czech Republic)	2–6	(France) Lyon	1–4	1–2
Trenčín (Slovakia)	1–2	(England) Hull City	0–0	1–2
Omonia (Cyprus)	4–0	(North Macedonia) Metalurg Skopje	3–0	1–0
IF Brommapojkarna (Sweden)	0–7	(Italy) Torino	0–3	0–4
PSV Eindhoven (Netherlands)	4–2	(Austria) St. Pölten	1–0	3–2
Stjarnan (Iceland)	1–0	(Poland) Lech Poznań	1–0	0–0
Zorya Luhansk (Ukraine)	3–2	(Norway) Molde	1–1	2–1
Sarajevo (Bosnia and Herzegovina)	4–3	(Greece) Atromitos	1–2	3–1 (a.e.t.)
Real Sociedad (Spain)	5–2	(Scotland) Aberdeen	2–0	3–2
Astana (Kazakhstan)	4–1	(Sweden) AIK	1–1	3–0
Zulte Waregem (Belgium)	4–7	(Belarus) Shakhtyor Soligorsk	2–5	2–2
Grödig (Austria)	2–2 (a)	(Moldova) Zimbru Chișinău	1–2	1–0
Astra Giurgiu (Romania)	6–2	(Czech Republic) Slovan Liberec	3–0	3–2
Ruch Chorzów (Poland)	2–2 (a)	(Denmark) Esbjerg	0–0	2–2
Dynamo Moscow (Russia)	3–2	(Israel) Ironi Kiryat Shmona	1–1	2–1
Young Boys (Switzerland)	3–0	(Cyprus) Ermis Aradippou	1–0	2–0
IF Elfsborg (Sweden)	5–3	(Iceland) FH	4–1	1–2
Petrolul Ploiești (Romania)	5–2	(Czech Republic) Viktoria Plzeň	1–1	4–1
Víkingur Gøta (Faroe Islands)	1–9	(Croatia) Rijeka	1–5	0–4
Dinamo Minsk (Belarus)	3–0	(Romania) CFR Cluj	1–0	2–0
Neftçi (Azerbaijan)	3–2	(Georgia (country)) Chikhura Sachkhere	0–0	3–2
IFK Göteborg (Sweden)	0–1	(Portugal) Rio Ave	0–1	0–0
Club Brugge (Belgium)	5–0	(Denmark) Brøndby	3–0	2–0
Shakhter Karagandy (Kazakhstan)	4–5	(Croatia) Hajduk Split	4–2	0–3

=== Matches ===
31 July 2014
19:00

Karabükspor (Turkey)	0–0	(Norway) Rosenborg
	Report

Dr. Necmettin Şeyhoğlu Stadium, Karabük
Attendance: 4,557
Referee: Libor Kovařík (Czech Republic)
7 August 2014
19:00

Rosenborg (Norway)	1–1	(Turkey) Karabükspor
Helland 8'	Report	Özmert 35'

Lerkendal Stadion, Trondheim
Attendance: 4,511
Referee: István Kovács (Romania)

1–1 on aggregate; Karabükspor won on away goals.

31 July 2014
20:00

RNK Split (Croatia)	2–0	(Ukraine) Chornomorets Odesa
Rog 25'; Belle 48'	Report

Stadion Park Mladeži, Split
Attendance: 2,000
Referee: Marcin Borski (Poland)
7 August 2014
18:00

Chornomorets Odesa (Ukraine)	0–0	(Croatia) RNK Split
	Report

Chornomorets Stadium, Odesa
Attendance: 11,453
Referee: Jesús Gil Manzano (Spain)

RNK Split won 2–0 on aggregate.

31 July 2014
20:45

St Johnstone (Scotland)	1–2	(Slovakia) Spartak Trnava
Mackay 90+3'	Report	Schranz 34', 63'

McDiarmid Park, Perth
Attendance: 7,001
Referee: Mattias Gestranius (Finland)
7 August 2014
19:30

Spartak Trnava (Slovakia)	1–1	(Scotland) St Johnstone
Mikovič 82'	Report	May 42'

Štadión FC ViOn, Zlaté Moravce
Attendance: 3,884
Referee: Javier Estrada Fernández (Spain)

Spartak Trnava won 3–2 on aggregate.

31 July 2014
20:30

Mainz 05 (Germany)	1–0	(Greece) Asteras Tripolis
Okazaki 45'	Report

Coface Arena, Mainz
Attendance: 18,287
Referee: Jorge Sousa (Portugal)
7 August 2014
20:15

Asteras Tripolis (Greece)	3–1	(Germany) Mainz 05
De Blasis 30'; Mazza 68', 86'	Report	Koo Ja-cheol 39'

Theodoros Kolokotronis Stadium, Tripoli
Attendance: 3,659
Referee: Serge Gumienny (Belgium)

Asteras Tripolis won 3–2 on aggregate.

31 July 2014
20:30

Diósgyőr (Hungary)	1–5	(Russia) Krasnodar
Bacsa 49'	Report	Ari 28'; Ahmedov 40'; Pereyra 51'; Joãozinho 88' (pen.); Bystrov 90'

Nagyerdei Stadion, Debrecen
Attendance: 4,664
Referee: Bülent Yıldırım (Turkey)
7 August 2014
18:00

Krasnodar (Russia)	3–0	(Hungary) Diósgyőr
Konaté 30', 55'; Ari 86'	Report

Kuban Stadium, Krasnodar
Attendance: 8,800
Referee: Christian Dingert (Germany)

Krasnodar won 8–1 on aggregate.

31 July 2014
19:00

Mladá Boleslav (Czech Republic)	1–4	(France) Lyon
Rosa 66'	Report	Yattara 9', 47'; Gonalons 36'; Umtiti 67'

Městský stadion, Mladá Boleslav
Attendance: 4,800
Referee: Tobias Welz (Germany)
7 August 2014
20:30

Lyon (France)	2–1	(Czech Republic) Mladá Boleslav
Lacazette 58'; N'Jie 89'	Report	Milla 71' (pen.)

Stade de Gerland, Lyon
Attendance: 22,717
Referee: Stephan Klossner (Switzerland)

Lyon won 6–2 on aggregate.

31 July 2014
19:00

Trenčín (Slovakia)	0–0	(England) Hull City
	Report

Štadión pod Dubňom, Žilina
Attendance: 8,254
Referee: Davide Massa (Italy)
7 August 2014
20:30

Hull City (England)	2–1	(Slovakia) Trenčín
Elmohamady 27'; Aluko 80'	Report	Malec 2'

KC Stadium, Kingston upon Hull
Attendance: 21,156
Referee: Bas Nijhuis (Netherlands)

Hull City won 2–1 on aggregate.

31 July 2014
18:00

Omonia (Cyprus)	3–0	(North Macedonia) Metalurg Skopje
Cristóvão 9', 57'; Poté 14'	Report

GSP Stadium, Nicosia
Attendance: 13,050
Referee: Gediminas Mažeika (Lithuania)
7 August 2014
20:45

Metalurg Skopje (North Macedonia)	0–1	(Cyprus) Omonia
	Report	Assis 54'

Philip II Arena, Skopje
Attendance: 664
Referee: Padraig Sutton (Republic of Ireland)

Omonia won 4–0 on aggregate.

31 July 2014
19:00

IF Brommapojkarna (Sweden)	0–3	(Italy) Torino
	Report	Larrondo 45' (pen.), 53'; Barreto 58'

Tele2 Arena, Stockholm
Attendance: 2,043
Referee: Serdar Gözübüyük (Netherlands)
7 August 2014
20:30

Torino (Italy)	4–0	(Sweden) IF Brommapojkarna
Jónsson 4' (o.g.); Darmian 37'; Quagliarella 80' (pen.); Martínez 90'	Report

Stadio Olimpico, Turin
Attendance: 22,931
Referee: Paweł Raczkowski (Poland)

Torino won 7–0 on aggregate.

31 July 2014
19:00

PSV Eindhoven (Netherlands)	1–0	(Austria) St. Pölten
De Jong 56'	Report

Philips Stadion, Eindhoven
Attendance: 22,000
Referee: Slavko Vinčić (Slovenia)
7 August 2014
19:00

St. Pölten (Austria)	2–3	(Netherlands) PSV Eindhoven
Segovia 56'; Kerschbaumer 90'	Report	Locadia 28'; Depay 69'; De Jong 70'

NV Arena, Sankt Pölten
Attendance: 8,000
Referee: Artur Soares Dias (Portugal)

PSV Eindhoven won 4–2 on aggregate.

31 July 2014
20:30

Stjarnan (Iceland)	1–0	(Poland) Lech Poznań
Toft 48'	Report

Stjörnuvöllur, Garðabær
Attendance: 1,000
Referee: Ognjen Valjić (Bosnia and Herzegovina)
7 August 2014
19:00

Lech Poznań (Poland)	0–0	(Iceland) Stjarnan
	Report

INEA Stadion, Poznań
Attendance: 22,619
Referee: Pavle Radovanović (Montenegro)

Stjarnan won 1–0 on aggregate.

31 July 2014
19:30

Zorya Luhansk (Ukraine)	1–1	(Norway) Molde
Kamenyuka 62'	Report	Svendsen 88'

Valeriy Lobanovskyi Dynamo Stadium, Kyiv (Note: The third qualifying and play-off round matches were played at Valeriy Lobanovskyi Dynamo Stadium, Kyiv instead of Zorya Luhansk's home stadium, Avanhard Stadium, Luhansk, due to the war conditions in Eastern Ukraine.)
Attendance: 3,250
Referee: Harald Lechner (Austria)
7 August 2014
18:00

Molde (Norway)	1–2	(Ukraine) Zorya Luhansk
Gulbrandsen 43'	Report	Kamenyuka 2'; Forren 89' (o.g.)

Aker Stadion, Molde
Attendance: 4,438
Referee: Steven McLean (Scotland)

Zorya Luhansk won 3–2 on aggregate.

31 July 2014
20:30

Sarajevo (Bosnia and Herzegovina)	1–2	(Greece) Atromitos
Puzigaća 26'	Report	Fytanidis 11'; Nastos 75'

Asim Ferhatović Hase Stadium, Sarajevo
Attendance: 14,000
Referee: Ivaylo Stoyanov (Bulgaria)
7 August 2014
20:00

Atromitos (Greece)	1–3 (a.e.t.)	(Bosnia and Herzegovina) Sarajevo
Tavlaridis 86'	Report	Duljević 24'; Bilbija 80', 105'

Peristeri Stadium, Peristeri
Attendance: 2,300
Referee: Arnold Hunter (Northern Ireland)

Sarajevo won 4–3 on aggregate.

31 July 2014
20:30

Real Sociedad (Spain)	2–0	(Scotland) Aberdeen
Zurutuza 53'; Canales 68'	Report

Anoeta, San Sebastián
Attendance: 21,147
Referee: Bastian Dankert (Germany)
7 August 2014
20:45

Aberdeen (Scotland)	2–3	(Spain) Real Sociedad
Pawlett 44'; Reynolds 57'	Report	Prieto 28', 86' (pen.); Bergara 90+1'

Pittodrie Stadium, Aberdeen
Attendance: 17,676
Referee: Eitan Shemeulevitch (Israel)

Real Sociedad won 5–2 on aggregate.

31 July 2014
16:00

Astana (Kazakhstan)	1–1	(Sweden) AIK
Nusserbayev 42'	Report	Bahoui 9'

Astana Arena, Astana
Attendance: 16,200
Referee: Ante Vučemilović-Šimunović Jr. (Croatia)
7 August 2014
19:00

AIK (Sweden)	0–3	(Kazakhstan) Astana
	Report	Foxi 36'; Shomko 54'; Dzholchiev 71'

Friends Arena, Solna
Attendance: 12,314
Referee: Michael Koukoulakis (Greece)

Astana won 4–1 on aggregate.

31 July 2014
20:00

Zulte Waregem (Belgium)	2–5	(Belarus) Shakhtyor Soligorsk
Plet 40'; Conté 75'	Report	Halyuza 4'; Matsveychyk 12'; Starhorodskyi 45+4'; Yanush 78'; Guruli 90+1'

Regenboogstadion, Waregem
Attendance: 4,474
Referee: Fırat Aydınus (Turkey)
7 August 2014
19:00

Shakhtyor Soligorsk (Belarus)	2–2	(Belgium) Zulte Waregem
Balanovich 7', 42'	Report	Sylla 40', 73'

Borisov Arena, Borisov
Attendance: 4,500
Referee: Leontios Trattou (Cyprus)

Shakhtyor Soligorsk won 7–4 on aggregate.

31 July 2014
21:05

Grödig (Austria)	1–2	(Moldova) Zimbru Chișinău
Correa 89'	Report	Alexeev 35'; Handle 59' (o.g.)

Red Bull Arena, Wals-Siezenheim
Attendance: 1,926
Referee: Simon Lee Evans (Wales)
7 August 2014
21:05

Zimbru Chișinău (Moldova)	0–1	(Austria) Grödig
	Report	Djuric 84'

Zimbru Stadium, Chișinău
Attendance: 9,150
Referee: Antti Munukka (Finland)

2–2 on aggregate; Zimbru Chișinău won on away goals.

31 July 2014
18:00

Astra Giurgiu (Romania)	3–0	(Czech Republic) Slovan Liberec
Fatai 4', 74', 81'	Report

Stadionul Marin Anastasovici, Giurgiu
Attendance: 4,067
Referee: Ilias Spathas (Greece)
7 August 2014
18:00

Slovan Liberec (Czech Republic)	2–3	(Romania) Astra Giurgiu
Šural 45'; Obročník 45+3'	Report	Enache 37'; Rus 83'; Bukari 89'

Stadion u Nisy, Liberec
Attendance: 2,445
Referee: Artyom Kuchin (Kazakhstan)

Astra Giurgiu won 6–2 on aggregate.

31 July 2014
18:00

Ruch Chorzów (Poland)	0–0	(Denmark) Esbjerg
	Report

Stadion Piast, Gliwice (Note: The matches were played at Stadion Piast, Gliwice instead of Ruch Chorzów's home stadium, Stadion Miejski, Chorzów, due to bad pitch conditions.)
Attendance: 4,000
Referee: Vlado Glođović (Serbia)
7 August 2014
18:00

Esbjerg (Denmark)	2–2	(Poland) Ruch Chorzów
Nielsen 29'; Pušić 85'	Report	Starzyński 13' (pen.); Surma 90+5'

Blue Water Arena, Esbjerg
Attendance: 7,008
Referee: Kristo Tohver (Estonia)

2–2 on aggregate; Ruch Chorzów won on away goals.

31 July 2014
18:00

Dynamo Moscow (Russia)	1–1	(Israel) Ironi Kiryat Shmona
Kurányi 71'	Report	Kola 63'

Arena Khimki, Khimki
Attendance: 7,583
Referee: Kristinn Jakobsson (Iceland)
7 August 2014
19:00

Ironi Kiryat Shmona (Israel)	1–2	(Russia) Dynamo Moscow
Kahat 11'	Report	Kurányi 22' (pen.); Ionov 30'

GSP Stadium, Nicosia, Cyprus (Note: On 17 July 2014, the UEFA Emergency Panel decided that Israeli clubs must play their home legs outside of the country "until further notice" due to the 2014 Israel–Gaza conflict.)
Attendance: 464
Referee: Richard Liesveld (Netherlands)

Dynamo Moscow won 3–2 on aggregate.

31 July 2014
19:30

Young Boys (Switzerland)	1–0	(Cyprus) Ermis Aradippou
Nuzzolo 58'	Report

Stade de Suisse, Bern
Attendance: 7,346
Referee: Clayton Pisani (Malta)
7 August 2014
16:00

Ermis Aradippou (Cyprus)	0–2	(Switzerland) Young Boys
	Report	Steffen 36'; Frey 66'

Antonis Papadopoulos Stadium, Larnaca
Attendance: 1,000
Referee: Kevin Clancy (Scotland)

Young Boys won 3–0 on aggregate.

31 July 2014
18:00

IF Elfsborg (Sweden)	4–1	(Iceland) FH
Holmén 55' (pen.); Frick 70'; Rohdén 81'; Hedlund 89' (pen.)	Report	Lennon 61'

Borås Arena, Borås
Attendance: 3,889
Referee: Tom Harald Hagen (Norway)
7 August 2014
20:30

FH (Iceland)	2–1	(Sweden) IF Elfsborg
Guðnason 17'; Doumbia 76'	Report	Beckmann 90+4'

Kaplakriki, Hafnarfjörður
Attendance: 1,543
Referee: Robert Schörgenhofer (Austria)

IF Elfsborg won 5–3 on aggregate.

31 July 2014
20:00

Petrolul Ploiești (Romania)	1–1	(Czech Republic) Viktoria Plzeň
Mutu 76'	Report	Kolář 90+1'

Ilie Oană Stadium, Ploiești
Attendance: 11,244
Referee: Anthony Taylor (England)
7 August 2014
20:00

Viktoria Plzeň (Czech Republic)	1–4	(Romania) Petrolul Ploiești
Pilař 40'	Report	Teixeira 20'; Mutu 38'; De Lucas 43'; Tamuz 69'

Doosan Arena, Plzeň
Attendance: 10,521
Referee: Benoît Millot (France)

Petrolul Ploiești won 5–2 on aggregate.

31 July 2014
20:00

Víkingur Gøta (Faroe Islands)	1–5	(Croatia) Rijeka
Hansson 35'	Report	Lešković 14'; Kvržić 45+1', 76'; Jahović 52'; Kramarić 81' (pen.)

Tórsvøllur, Tórshavn
Attendance: 1,203
Referee: Dimitar Meckarovski (Macedonia)
7 August 2014
21:15

Rijeka (Croatia)	4–0	(Faroe Islands) Víkingur Gøta
Jahović 39', 48', 64'; E. Jacobsen 77' (o.g.)	Report

Stadion Kantrida, Rijeka
Attendance: 5,036
Referee: Vitali Meshkov (Russia)

Rijeka won 9–1 on aggregate.

31 July 2014
19:00

Dinamo Minsk (Belarus)	1–0	(Romania) CFR Cluj
Adamović 54'	Report

Borisov Arena, Barysaw
Attendance: 5,281
Referee: Martin Hansson (Sweden)
7 August 2014
19:30

CFR Cluj (Romania)	0–2	(Belarus) Dinamo Minsk
	Report	Stasevich 71'; Udoji 81' (pen.)

Stadionul Dr. Constantin Rădulescu, Cluj-Napoca
Attendance: 5,137
Referee: Antony Gautier (France)

Dinamo Minsk won 3–0 on aggregate.

31 July 2014
17:00

Neftçi (Azerbaijan)	0–0	(Georgia (country)) Chikhura Sachkhere
	Report

Bakcell Arena, Baku
Attendance: 10,800
Referee: Cristian Balaj (Romania)
7 August 2014
19:00

Chikhura Sachkhere (Georgia (country))	2–3	(Azerbaijan) Neftçi
Gabedava 30', 50'	Report	Nfor 16', 27', 38'

Mikheil Meskhi Stadium, Tbilisi
Attendance: 21,359
Referee: Tamás Bognár (Hungary)

Neftçi won 3–2 on aggregate.

31 July 2014
19:00

IFK Göteborg (Sweden)	0–1	(Portugal) Rio Ave
	Report	Koka 22'

Gamla Ullevi, Gothenburg
Attendance: 7,137
Referee: Fernando Teixeira Vitienes (Spain)
7 August 2014
21:00

Rio Ave (Portugal)	0–0	(Sweden) IFK Göteborg
	Report

Estádio dos Arcos, Vila do Conde
Attendance: 6,735
Referee: Paolo Valeri (Italy)

Rio Ave won 1–0 on aggregate.

31 July 2014
20:30

Club Brugge (Belgium)	3–0	(Denmark) Brøndby
Duarte 14'; Castillo 30'; Vázquez 63'	Report

Jan Breydel Stadium, Bruges
Attendance: 24,217
Referee: Vladislav Bezborodov (Russia)
7 August 2014
20:00

Brøndby (Denmark)	0–2	(Belgium) Club Brugge
	Report	Castillo 38'; Fernando 45+1'

Brøndby Stadium, Brøndbyvester
Attendance: 10,046
Referee: Alon Yefet (Israel)

Club Brugge won 5–0 on aggregate.

31 July 2014
14:30

Shakhter Karagandy (Kazakhstan)	4–2	(Croatia) Hajduk Split
Topčagić 11'; Finonchenko 21'; Đidić 71'; Zhangylyshbay 90+4'	Report	Gotal 2'; Caktaš 78' (pen.)

Shakhter Stadium, Karaganda
Attendance: 13,300
Referee: Aliyar Ağayev (Azerbaijan)
7 August 2014
19:30

Hajduk Split (Croatia)	3–0	(Kazakhstan) Shakhter Karagandy
Sušić 14'; Maglica 36'; Gotal 90+5'	Report

Stadion Poljud, Split
Attendance: 28,000
Referee: Tony Chapron (France)

Hajduk Split won 5–4 on aggregate.

== Play-off round ==
=== Summary ===
The first legs were played on 20 and 21 August, and the second legs were played on 28 August 2014.

Team 1	Agg.	Team 2	1st leg	2nd leg
Sarajevo (Bosnia and Herzegovina)	2–10	(Germany) Borussia Mönchengladbach	2–3	0–7
Apollon Limassol (Cyprus)	5–2	(Russia) Lokomotiv Moscow	1–1	4–1
Astana (Kazakhstan)	0–7	(Spain) Villarreal	0–3	0–4
Young Boys (Switzerland)	3–1	(Hungary) Debrecen	3–1	0–0
PEC Zwolle (Netherlands)	2–4	(Czech Republic) Sparta Prague	1–1	1–3
Spartak Trnava (Slovakia)	2–4	(Switzerland) Zürich	1–3	1–1
Asteras Tripolis (Greece)	3–3 (a)	(Israel) Maccabi Tel Aviv	2–0	1–3
AEL Limassol (Cyprus)	1–5	(England) Tottenham Hotspur	1–2	0–3
Dnipro Dnipropetrovsk (Ukraine)	2–1	(Croatia) Hajduk Split	2–1	0–0
Dinamo Minsk (Belarus)	5–2	(Portugal) Nacional	2–0	3–2
Qarabağ (Azerbaijan)	1–1 (a)	(Netherlands) Twente	0–0	1–1
Petrolul Ploiești (Romania)	2–5	(Croatia) Dinamo Zagreb	1–3	1–2
HJK (Finland)	5–4	(Austria) Rapid Wien	2–1	3–3
Trabzonspor (Turkey)	2–0	(Russia) Rostov	2–0	0–0
Zimbru Chișinău (Moldova)	1–4	(Greece) PAOK	1–0	0–4
RNK Split (Croatia)	0–1	(Italy) Torino	0–0	0–1
Dynamo Moscow (Russia)	4–3 (Note: Order of legs reversed after original draw.)	(Cyprus) Omonia	2–2	2–1
Aktobe (Kazakhstan)	0–3	(Poland) Legia Warsaw	0–1	0–2
Lyon (France)	2–2 (a)	(Romania) Astra Giurgiu	1–2	1–0
Lokeren (Belgium)	2–2 (a)	(England) Hull City	1–0	1–2
Partizan (Serbia)	5–3	(Azerbaijan) Neftçi	3–2	2–1
Ruch Chorzów (Poland)	0–1	(Ukraine) Metalist Kharkiv	0–0	0–1 (a.e.t.)
IF Elfsborg (Sweden)	2–2 (a)	(Portugal) Rio Ave	2–1	0–1
PSV Eindhoven (Netherlands)	3–0	(Belarus) Shakhtyor Soligorsk	1–0	2–0
Karabükspor (Turkey)	1–1 (3–4 p)	(France) Saint-Étienne	1–0	0–1 (a.e.t.)
Stjarnan (Iceland)	0–9	(Italy) Internazionale	0–3	0–6
Panathinaikos (Greece)	6–2	(Denmark) Midtjylland	4–1	2–1
Zorya Luhansk (Ukraine)	4–5	(Netherlands) Feyenoord	1–1	3–4
Grasshopper (Switzerland)	1–3	(Belgium) Club Brugge	1–2	0–1
Real Sociedad (Spain)	1–3	(Russia) Krasnodar	1–0	0–3
Rijeka (Croatia)	4–0	(Moldova) Sheriff Tiraspol	1–0	3–0

=== Matches ===
21 August 2014
20:45

Sarajevo (Bosnia and Herzegovina)	2–3	(Germany) Borussia Mönchengladbach
Puzigaća 26'; Duljević 59'	Report	Hahn 11'; Hrgota 41', 73'

Asim Ferhatović Hase Stadium, Sarajevo
Attendance: 29,000
Referee: Antonio Mateu Lahoz (Spain)
28 August 2014
20:45

Borussia Mönchengladbach (Germany)	7–0	(Bosnia and Herzegovina) Sarajevo
Hahn 20'; Xhaka 24'; Hrgota 34', 67', 82'; Hazard 74' (pen.), 90+2'	Report

Borussia-Park, Mönchengladbach
Attendance: 44,152
Referee: Vladislav Bezborodov (Russia)

Borussia Mönchengladbach won 10–2 on aggregate.

21 August 2014
19:30

Apollon Limassol (Cyprus)	1–1	(Russia) Lokomotiv Moscow
Abraham 80'	Report	Kasaev 39'

GSP Stadium, Nicosia
Attendance: 7,146
Referee: Ivan Bebek (Croatia)
28 August 2014
17:00

Lokomotiv Moscow (Russia)	1–4	(Cyprus) Apollon Limassol
Pavlyuchenko 85'	Report	Rezek 20'; Papoulis 51'; Thuram 78'; López 84'

Lokomotiv Stadium, Moscow
Attendance: 6,520
Referee: Stefan Johannesson (Sweden)

Apollon Limassol won 5–2 on aggregate.

21 August 2014
17:00

Astana (Kazakhstan)	0–3	(Spain) Villarreal
	Report	Cani 33'; G. dos Santos 48'; Mario 84'

Astana Arena, Astana
Attendance: 27,500
Referee: Bas Nijhuis (Netherlands)
28 August 2014
20:45

Villarreal (Spain)	4–0	(Kazakhstan) Astana
Vietto 21', 54'; Bruno 61' (pen.); Nahuel 67'	Report

El Madrigal, Villarreal
Attendance: 11,564
Referee: Liran Liany (Israel)

Villarreal won 7–0 on aggregate.

21 August 2014
19:30

Young Boys (Switzerland)	3–1	(Hungary) Debrecen
Nuzzolo 26'; Steffen 67'; Frey 87'	Report	Sidibe 39'

Stade de Suisse, Bern
Attendance: 7,927
Referee: Tom Harald Hagen (Norway)
28 August 2014
20:30

Debrecen (Hungary)	0–0	(Switzerland) Young Boys
	Report

Nagyerdei Stadion, Debrecen
Attendance: 6,393
Referee: David Fernández Borbalán (Spain)

Young Boys won 3–1 on aggregate.

21 August 2014
20:00

PEC Zwolle (Netherlands)	1–1	(Czech Republic) Sparta Prague
Lukoki 77'	Report	Krejčí 82'

IJsseldelta Stadion, Zwolle
Attendance: 12,130
Referee: Michael Oliver (England)
28 August 2014
20:30

Sparta Prague (Czech Republic)	3–1	(Netherlands) PEC Zwolle
Krejčí 10'; Dočkal 44'; Brabec 62'	Report	Nijland 83' (pen.)

Generali Arena, Prague
Attendance: 16,612
Referee: Ivan Bebek (Croatia)

Sparta Prague won 4–2 on aggregate.

21 August 2014
20:15

Spartak Trnava (Slovakia)	1–3	(Switzerland) Zürich
Vlasko 14' (pen.)	Report	Chermiti 4', 45+2', 58'

Štadión FC ViOn, Zlaté Moravce
Attendance: 3,840
Referee: Leontios Trattou (Cyprus)
28 August 2014
20:30

Zürich (Switzerland)	1–1	(Slovakia) Spartak Trnava
Chikhaoui 48'	Report	Špalek 90+2'

AFG Arena, St. Gallen
Attendance: 4,252
Referee: Bobby Madden (Scotland)

Zürich won 4–2 on aggregate.

21 August 2014
20:15

Asteras Tripolis (Greece)	2–0	(Israel) Maccabi Tel Aviv
Mazza 29'; Zisopoulos 47'	Report

Theodoros Kolokotronis Stadium, Tripoli
Attendance: 4,451
Referee: Paolo Tagliavento (Italy)
28 August 2014
19:30

Maccabi Tel Aviv (Israel)	3–1	(Greece) Asteras Tripolis
Badash 27'; Zahavi 54' (pen.); Prica 75'	Report	Goian 23'

Antonis Papadopoulos Stadium, Larnaca, Cyprus
Attendance: 350
Referee: Deniz Aytekin (Germany)

3–3 on aggregate; Asteras Tripolis won on away goals.

21 August 2014
18:00

AEL Limassol (Cyprus)	1–2	(England) Tottenham Hotspur
Adrián 14'	Report	Soldado 74'; Kane 80'

Antonis Papadopoulos Stadium, Larnaca
Attendance: 7,200
Referee: Jorge Sousa (Portugal)
28 August 2014
20:45

Tottenham Hotspur (England)	3–0	(Cyprus) AEL Limassol
Kane 45'; Paulinho 49'; Townsend 66' (pen.)	Report

White Hart Lane, London
Attendance: 29,976
Referee: Miroslav Zelinka (Czech Republic)

Tottenham Hotspur won 5–1 on aggregate.

20 August 2014
18:00

Dnipro Dnipropetrovsk (Ukraine)	2–1	(Croatia) Hajduk Split
Kalinić 50'; Shakhov 88'	Report	Sušić 47'

Olympic Stadium, Kyiv (Note: The match was played at Olympic Stadium, Kyiv instead of Dnipro Dnipropetrovsk's home stadium, Dnipro-Arena, Dnipropetrovsk, due to the pro-Russian unrest in Ukraine.)
Attendance: 10,320
Referee: Aleksei Kulbakov (Belarus)
28 August 2014
19:00

Hajduk Split (Croatia)	0–0	(Ukraine) Dnipro Dnipropetrovsk
	Report

Stadion Poljud, Split
Attendance: 31,000
Referee: Hüseyin Göçek (Turkey)

Dnipro Dnipropetrovsk won 2–1 on aggregate.

21 August 2014
19:00

Dinamo Minsk (Belarus)	2–0	(Portugal) Nacional
Stasevich 44' (pen.); Nikolić 55'	Report

Borisov Arena, Barysaw
Attendance: 5,930
Referee: Michael Koukoulakis (Greece)
28 August 2014
20:45

Nacional (Portugal)	2–3	(Belarus) Dinamo Minsk
Matias 30' (pen.); Ghazal 53'	Report	Udoji 32', 63'; Simović 40'

Estádio da Madeira, Funchal
Attendance: 4,127
Referee: Sébastien Delferiere (Belgium)

Dinamo Minsk won 5–2 on aggregate.

21 August 2014
18:00

Qarabağ (Azerbaijan)	0–0	(Netherlands) Twente
	Report

Tofiq Bahramov Republican Stadium, Baku
Attendance: 28,000
Referee: Manuel Gräfe (Germany)
28 August 2014
19:30

Twente (Netherlands)	1–1	(Azerbaijan) Qarabağ
Castaignos 37'	Report	Muarem 51'

De Grolsch Veste, Enschede
Attendance: 20,200
Referee: Paolo Mazzoleni (Italy)

1–1 on aggregate; Qarabağ won on away goals.

21 August 2014
19:15

Petrolul Ploiești (Romania)	1–3	(Croatia) Dinamo Zagreb
Tamuz 45'	Report	Čop 29' (pen.), 80'; Machado 90+6'

Ilie Oană Stadium, Ploiești
Attendance: 13,460
Referee: Daniele Orsato (Italy)
28 August 2014
21:00

Dinamo Zagreb (Croatia)	2–1	(Romania) Petrolul Ploiești
Čop 22'; Antolić 90+5'	Report	Albín 59'

Stadion Maksimir, Zagreb
Attendance: 10,212
Referee: Ivan Kružliak (Slovakia)

Dinamo Zagreb won 5–2 on aggregate.

21 August 2014
18:00

HJK (Finland)	2–1	(Austria) Rapid Wien
Lod 63'; Väyrynen 74'	Report	Schaub 58'

Sonera Stadium, Helsinki
Attendance: 6,153
Referee: Halis Özkahya (Turkey)
28 August 2014
20:30

Rapid Wien (Austria)	3–3	(Finland) HJK
Schaub 10', 13'; Wydra 90+4'	Report	Kandji 15'; Alho 77'; Savage 88' (pen.)

Ernst-Happel-Stadion, Vienna
Attendance: 21,100
Referee: Stéphane Lannoy (France)

HJK won 5–4 on aggregate.

21 August 2014
20:00

Trabzonspor (Turkey)	2–0	(Russia) Rostov
Medjani 37'; Cardozo 73'	Report

Hüseyin Avni Aker Stadium, Trabzon
Attendance: 6,101
Referee: Gediminas Mažeika (Lithuania)
28 August 2014
19:00

Rostov (Russia)	0–0	(Turkey) Trabzonspor
	Report

Olimp-2, Rostov-on-Don
Attendance: 14,950
Referee: Felix Zwayer (Germany)

Trabzonspor won 2–0 on aggregate.

21 August 2014
20:05

Zimbru Chișinău (Moldova)	1–0	(Greece) PAOK
Burghiu 80'	Report

Zimbru Stadium, Chișinău
Attendance: 8,530
Referee: Libor Kovařík (Czech Republic)
28 August 2014
18:15

PAOK (Greece)	4–0	(Moldova) Zimbru Chișinău
Pereyra 11'; Athanasiadis 45'; Mak 79'; Martens 84'	Report

Toumba Stadium, Thessaloniki
Attendance: 14,843
Referee: Serhiy Boyko (Ukraine)

PAOK won 4–1 on aggregate.

21 August 2014
20:30

RNK Split (Croatia)	0–0	(Italy) Torino
	Report

Stadion Hrvatski vitezovi, Dugopolje
Attendance: 4,522
Referee: Steven McLean (Scotland)
28 August 2014
20:30

Torino (Italy)	1–0	(Croatia) RNK Split
El Kaddouri 22' (pen.)	Report

Stadio Olimpico, Turin
Attendance: 20,857
Referee: Anastasios Sidiropoulos (Greece)

Torino won 1–0 on aggregate.

21 August 2014
17:30

Dynamo Moscow (Russia)	2–2	(Cyprus) Omonia
Samba 33'; Büttner 72'	Report	Lobjanidze 2'; Fofana 59'

Arena Khimki, Khimki
Attendance: 6,381
Referee: Stephan Studer (Switzerland)
28 August 2014
18:00

Omonia (Cyprus)	1–2	(Russia) Dynamo Moscow
Poté 23'	Report	Stepanov 11' (o.g.); Samba 90+3'

GSP Stadium, Nicosia
Attendance: 20,081
Referee: Alexandru Tudor (Romania)

Dynamo Moscow won 4–3 on aggregate.

21 August 2014
17:00

Aktobe (Kazakhstan)	0–1	(Poland) Legia Warsaw
	Report	Duda 48'

Aktobe Central Stadium, Aktobe
Attendance: 11,500
Referee: Sergei Karasev (Russia)
28 August 2014
21:00

Legia Warsaw (Poland)	2–0	(Kazakhstan) Aktobe
Kucharczyk 26'; Vrdoljak 66' (pen.)	Report

Polish Army Stadium, Warsaw
Attendance: 18,549
Referee: Mattias Gestranius (Finland)

Legia Warsaw won 3–0 on aggregate.

21 August 2014
20:30

Lyon (France)	1–2	(Romania) Astra Giurgiu
Malbranque 25'	Report	Fatai 72'; Budescu 81' (pen.)

Stade de Gerland, Lyon
Attendance: 20,001
Referee: Carlos Clos Gómez (Spain)
28 August 2014
18:45

Astra Giurgiu (Romania)	0–1	(France) Lyon
	Report	Ferri 23'

Stadionul Marin Anastasovici, Giurgiu
Attendance: 7,200
Referee: Sergei Karasev (Russia)

2–2 on aggregate; Astra Giurgiu won on away goals.

21 August 2014
20:30

Lokeren (Belgium)	1–0	(England) Hull City
Vanaken 58'	Report

Daknamstadion, Lokeren
Attendance: 7,935
Referee: Matej Jug (Slovenia)
28 August 2014
20:45

Hull City (England)	2–1	(Belgium) Lokeren
Brady 6' (pen.), 55'	Report	Remacle 49'

KC Stadium, Kingston upon Hull
Attendance: 18,149
Referee: Ovidiu Hațegan (Romania)

2–2 on aggregate; Lokeren won on away goals.

21 August 2014
20:15

Partizan (Serbia)	3–2	(Azerbaijan) Neftçi
Denis 29' (o.g.); Grbić 32'; Yunuszade 69' (o.g.)	Report	Denis 10', 17'

Partizan Stadium, Belgrade
Attendance: 10,177
Referee: Hüseyin Göçek (Turkey)
28 August 2014
18:00

Neftçi (Azerbaijan)	1–2	(Serbia) Partizan
Wobay 58'	Report	Škuletić 24', 90+2'

Tofiq Bahramov Republican Stadium, Baku
Attendance: 22,350
Referee: Robert Schörgenhofer (Austria)

Partizan won 5–3 on aggregate.

21 August 2014
18:00

Ruch Chorzów (Poland)	0–0	(Ukraine) Metalist Kharkiv
	Report

Stadion Piast, Gliwice
Attendance: 6,114
Referee: Alon Yefet (Israel)
28 August 2014
18:00

Metalist Kharkiv (Ukraine)	1–0 (a.e.t.)	(Poland) Ruch Chorzów
Cleiton Xavier 105+1' (pen.)	Report

Olympic Stadium, Kyiv (Note: The match was played at Olympic Stadium, Kyiv instead of Metalist Kharkiv's home stadium, Metalist Stadium, Kharkiv, due to the pro-Russian unrest in Ukraine.)
Attendance: 2,548
Referee: Tony Chapron (France)

Metalist Kharkiv won 1–0 on aggregate.

21 August 2014
19:00

IF Elfsborg (Sweden)	2–1	(Portugal) Rio Ave
Prodell 27'; Mobaeck 38'	Report	Marcelo 65'

Borås Arena, Borås
Attendance: 4,189
Referee: Slavko Vinčić (Slovenia)
28 August 2014
22:15

Rio Ave (Portugal)	1–0	(Sweden) IF Elfsborg
Gonçalves 90+2'	Report

Estádio dos Arcos, Vila do Conde
Attendance: 8,730
Referee: Kevin Blom (Netherlands)

2–2 on aggregate; Rio Ave won on away goals.

21 August 2014
18:45

PSV Eindhoven (Netherlands)	1–0	(Belarus) Shakhtyor Soligorsk
Maher 59'	Report

Philips Stadion, Eindhoven
Attendance: 15,120
Referee: Cristian Balaj (Romania)
28 August 2014
19:00

Shakhtyor Soligorsk (Belarus)	0–2	(Netherlands) PSV Eindhoven
	Report	Depay 89', 90+3'

Borisov Arena, Barysaw
Attendance: 5,500
Referee: Simon Lee Evans (Wales)

PSV Eindhoven won 3–0 on aggregate.

21 August 2014
19:00

Karabükspor (Turkey)	1–0	(France) Saint-Étienne
Kumbela 60'	Report

Dr. Necmettin Şeyhoğlu Stadium, Karabük
Attendance: 6,336
Referee: Marcin Borski (Poland)
28 August 2014
20:30

Saint-Étienne (France)	1–0 (a.e.t.)	(Turkey) Karabükspor
Monnet-Paquet 13'	Report
Penalties
Cohade (penalty scored); Pogba (penalty scored); Monnet-Paquet (penalty scored); Clément (penalty missed); Gradel (penalty scored)	4–3	(penalty scored) Özgenç; (penalty scored) Özmert; (penalty scored) Mabiala; (penalty missed) Akgün; (penalty missed) Özek

Stade Geoffroy-Guichard, Saint-Étienne
Attendance: 27,280
Referee: Yevhen Aranovskiy (Ukraine)

1–1 on aggregate; Saint-Étienne won 4–3 on penalties.

20 August 2014
23:00

Stjarnan (Iceland)	0–3	(Italy) Internazionale
	Report	Icardi 41'; Dodô 48'; D'Ambrosio 89'

Laugardalsvöllur, Reykjavík
Attendance: 9,829
Referee: Marijo Strahonja (Croatia)
28 August 2014
20:45

Internazionale (Italy)	6–0	(Iceland) Stjarnan
Kovačić 28', 33', 51'; Osvaldo 47'; Icardi 69', 80'	Report

San Siro, Milan
Attendance: 46,440
Referee: Harald Lechner (Austria)

Internazionale won 9–0 on aggregate.

21 August 2014
20:00

Panathinaikos (Greece)	4–1	(Denmark) Midtjylland
Berg 21' (pen.), 24', 45', 89'	Report	Lauridsen 13'

Leoforos Alexandras Stadium, Athens
Attendance: 13,102
Referee: István Vad (Hungary)
28 August 2014
20:00

Midtjylland (Denmark)	1–2	(Greece) Panathinaikos
Igboun 73' (pen.)	Report	Nano 55'; Klonaridis 74'

MCH Arena, Herning
Attendance: 6,039
Referee: Danny Makkelie (Netherlands)

Panathinaikos won 6–2 on aggregate.

21 August 2014
19:45

Zorya Luhansk (Ukraine)	1–1	(Netherlands) Feyenoord
Bilyi 27'	Report	Te Vrede 38'

Valeriy Lobanovskyi Dynamo Stadium, Kyiv
Attendance: 3,700
Referee: Paweł Gil (Poland)
28 August 2014
20:00

Feyenoord (Netherlands)	4–3	(Ukraine) Zorya Luhansk
Te Vrede 18'; Schaken 26'; Bilyi 48' (o.g.); Manu 90+2'	Report	Malinovskyi 56', 80'; Bilyi 71'

De Kuip, Rotterdam
Attendance: 32,500
Referee: Kenn Hansen (Denmark)

Feyenoord won 5–4 on aggregate.

21 August 2014
20:15

Grasshopper (Switzerland)	1–2	(Belgium) Club Brugge
M. Lang 8'	Report	Jahić 14' (o.g.); Vázquez 15'

AFG Arena, St. Gallen
Attendance: 4,253
Referee: Clément Turpin (France)
28 August 2014
21:00

Club Brugge (Belgium)	1–0	(Switzerland) Grasshopper
Vázquez 62'	Report

Jan Breydel Stadium, Bruges
Attendance: 23,743
Referee: Luca Banti (Italy)

Club Brugge won 3–1 on aggregate.

21 August 2014
20:30

Real Sociedad (Spain)	1–0	(Russia) Krasnodar
Prieto 71'	Report

Anoeta, San Sebastián
Attendance: 22,245
Referee: Ruddy Buquet (France)
28 August 2014
18:00

Krasnodar (Russia)	3–0	(Spain) Real Sociedad
Joãozinho 71' (pen.); Pereyra 88'; Ari 90'	Report

Kuban Stadium, Krasnodar
Attendance: 26,572
Referee: Szymon Marciniak (Poland)

Krasnodar won 3–1 on aggregate.

21 August 2014
21:15

Rijeka (Croatia)	1–0	(Moldova) Sheriff Tiraspol
Leovac 85'	Report

Stadion Kantrida, Rijeka
Attendance: 9,020
Referee: Serge Gumienny (Belgium)
28 August 2014
19:00

Sheriff Tiraspol (Moldova)	0–3	(Croatia) Rijeka
	Report	Ligger 29' (o.g.); Kramarić 44'; Moisés 61'

Sheriff Stadium, Tiraspol
Attendance: 4,853
Referee: Jorge Sousa (Portugal)

Rijeka won 4–0 on aggregate.
