= 2015–16 Moldovan "B" Division =

Moldovan "B" Division
- Season: 2015–16

The 2015–16 Moldovan "B" Division season' is the 25th since its establishment. A new system with three divisions was approved, coming back to the system that was used between the 1993–94 and 1995–96 seasons.

== Final standings ==
=== Center ===
Pos	Team	Pld	W	D	L	GF	GA	GD	Pts
1	FC Bogzești (C)	14	10	3	1	34	12	+22	33
2	CS Anina Anenii Noi	14	9	2	3	30	19	+11	29
3	CFR Ialoveni	14	8	1	5	29	18	+11	25
4	Sinteza Căuşeni	14	6	3	5	24	20	+4	21
5	FC Cruiz	14	3	5	6	14	16	−2	14
6	Codru Călăraşi Junior	14	2	6	6	20	31	−11	12
7	CS Politeh	14	3	3	8	16	34	−18	12
8	CSF Cricova	14	3	1	10	16	33	−17	10

Updated to match(es) played on 1 May 2016. Source: Moldovan Football Federation (in Romanian)
Rules for classification: 1st points; 2nd head-to-head points; 3rd head-to-head goal difference; 4th goal difference; 5th goals scored; 6th number of wins; 7th Fair play competition
(C) Champions

=== North ===
Pos	Team	Pld	W	D	L	GF	GA	GD	Pts	Promotion
1	FC Sîngerei (C, P)	18	14	1	3	63	21	+42	43	Promotion to Divizia A
2	FC Floreşti	18	13	3	2	49	17	+32	42	
3	CS Intersport Sănătăuca	18	11	2	5	30	16	+14	35	
4	FC Grănicerul	18	10	4	4	39	16	+23	34	
5	CS Drochia	18	9	3	6	36	22	+14	30	
6	FC Fălești	18	8	2	8	33	32	+1	26	
7	FC Dava Soroca	18	5	2	11	25	53	−28	17	
8	FC Cotiujănii Mari	18	4	2	12	19	56	−37	14	
9	CF Rîşcani	18	3	3	12	22	49	−27	12	
10	FC Teleneşti (Note: FC Teleneşti was excluded from the championship according to the Competitions Committee decision of March 25, 2016. (in Romanian))	18	2	0	16	7	41	−34	6	

Updated to match(es) played on 1 May 2016. Source: Moldovan Football Federation (in Romanian)
Rules for classification: 1st points; 2nd head-to-head points; 3rd head-to-head goal difference; 4th goal difference; 5th goals scored; 6th number of wins; 7th Fair play competition
(C) Champions; (P) Promoted

=== South ===
Pos	Team	Pld	W	D	L	GF	GA	GD	Pts	Promotion
1	CF Sparta Selemet (C, P)	14	10	2	2	39	15	+24	32	Promotion to Divizia A
2	FC Cahul-2005	14	9	3	2	39	13	+26	30	
3	FC Sireți	14	8	1	5	27	22	+5	25	
4	FC Congaz	14	6	1	7	22	37	−15	19	
5	FC Slobozia Mare	14	5	3	6	29	31	−2	18	
6	FC Boldureşti	14	4	2	8	20	31	−11	14	
7	FC Trachia	14	4	1	9	19	34	−15	13	
8	FC Maiak Chirsova	14	3	1	10	23	34	−11	10	

Updated to match(es) played on 29 March 2016. Source: Moldovan Football Federation (in Romanian)
Rules for classification: 1st points; 2nd head-to-head points; 3rd head-to-head goal difference; 4th goal difference; 5th goals scored; 6th number of wins; 7th Fair play competition
(C) Champions; (P) Promoted
