= 2022–23 Moldovan Liga 1 =

Moldovan football's second-tier league

Liga 1
- Season: 2022–23
- Dates: 26 August 2022 – 10 May 2023
- Champions: Dacia Buiucani
- Promoted: Dacia Buiucani; Florești; Spartanii

The 2022–23 Moldovan Liga 1 was the 32nd season of Moldovan football's second-tier league.
The season started on 26 August 2022 and concluded on 10 May 2023, with play-off matches played between 6 and 24 May for a place in Super Liga next season.

== Teams ==
Location of teams in 2022–23 Liga 1

Club	Location
Fălești	Fălești
Florești	Florești
Olimp	Comrat
Real Succes	Chișinău
Sheriff-2	Tiraspol
Spartanii	Selemet
Speranis	Nisporeni
Speranța	Drochia
Sucleia	Sucleia
FCM Ungheni	Ungheni
Văsieni	Văsieni
Victoria	Chișinău
2 teams from Super Liga
Dacia Buiucani	Chișinău
Dinamo-Auto	Tiraspol

== Phase I ==
=== Group A ===
Pos	Team	Pld	W	D	L	GF	GA	GD	Pts	Qualification	FLO	FĂL	SHE	UNG	SPE	SUC
1	Florești	10	7	0	3	15	8	+7	21	Phase II Group 1		1–3	1–0	2–0	3–0	3–1
2	Fălești	10	6	1	3	22	16	+6	19	Phase II Group 1	1–2		1–1	4–1	1–3	2–1
3	Sheriff-2 Tiraspol (Note: Ineligible for Phase II Group 1)	10	5	3	2	28	6	+22	18	Phase II Group 2	0–1	4–1		2–1	4–0	11–0
4	FCM Ungheni	10	5	1	4	20	15	+5	16	Phase II Group 2	1–0	0–2	1–1		3–2	6–0
5	Speranis Nisporeni	10	3	1	6	17	27	−10	10	Phase II Group 2	2–1	2–4	0–0	2–4		6–1
6	Sucleia	10	1	0	9	10	40	−30	3	Phase II Group 2	0–1	1–3	0–5	0–3	6–0	

Source: FMF, Soccerway
Legend: Blue = home team win; Yellow = draw; Red = away team win.
Rules for classification: 1) Points; 2) Head-to-head points; 3) Head-to-head goal difference; 4) Head-to-head away goals scored; 5) Head-to-head goals scored; 6) Matches won; 7) Goal difference; 8) Goals scored; 9) Least red cards; 10) Least yellow cards.

=== Group B ===
Pos	Team	Pld	W	D	L	GF	GA	GD	Pts	Qualification	VIC	SPA	SPE	VĂS	OLI	REA
1	Victoria Chișinău	10	8	0	2	41	9	+32	24 (Note: Head-to-head goal difference: Victoria : +2, Spartanii : –2.)	Phase II Group 1		5–0	1–0	5–1	9–0	7–0
2	Spartanii Selemet	10	8	0	2	25	11	+14	24	Phase II Group 1	4–1		3–0	4–0	2–1	2–0
3	Speranța Drochia	10	4	1	5	14	14	0	13	Phase II Group 2	2–1	3–0		0–1	2–2	3–1
4	Văsieni	10	4	0	6	13	24	−11	12	Phase II Group 2	0–2	1–2	2–1		3–1	1–6
5	Olimp Comrat	10	2	2	6	12	28	−16	8	Phase II Group 2	1–3	0–4	1–2	2–1		2–0
6	Real Succes	10	2	1	7	13	32	−19	7	Phase II Group 2	1–7	0–4	2–1	1–3	2–2	

Source: FMF, Soccerway
Legend: Blue = home team win; Yellow = draw; Red = away team win.
Rules for classification: 1) Points; 2) Head-to-head points; 3) Head-to-head goal difference; 4) Head-to-head away goals scored; 5) Head-to-head goals scored; 6) Matches won; 7) Goal difference; 8) Goals scored; 9) Least red cards; 10) Least yellow cards.

== Phase II ==
=== Group 1 ===
Pos	Team	Pld	W	D	L	GF	GA	GD	Pts	Promotion or qualification	DAC	FLO	DIN	SPA	VIC	FĂL
1	Dacia Buiucani (C, P)	10	8	2	0	26	3	+23	26	Promotion to Super Liga		2–0	1–0	2–0	3–1	3–1
2	Florești (P)	10	7	1	2	23	8	+15	22	Play-offs	0–0		2–0	4–0	3–1	7–0
3	Dinamo-Auto (Note: Dinamo-Auto and subsequently Victoria failed to obtain the necessary license to compete in the 2023–24 Super Liga season. As a consequence, Florești and Spartanii were promoted instead.) (O)	10	5	2	3	22	9	+13	17	Play-offs	0–0	2–0		2–0	1–2	6–2
4	Spartanii Selemet (P)	10	4	1	5	17	20	−3	13	Play-offs	0–5	1–2	1–1		4–1	3–1
5	Victoria Chișinău	10	3	0	7	16	25	−9	9	Play-offs	1–5	1–2	0–2	1–3		3–1
6	Fălești	10	0	0	10	9	48	−39	0	Play-offs	0–5	1–3	1–8	1–5	1–5	

Source: FMF, Soccerway
Legend: Blue = home team win; Yellow = draw; Red = away team win.
Rules for classification: 1) Points; 2) Head-to-head points; 3) Head-to-head goal difference; 4) Head-to-head away goals scored; 5) Head-to-head goals scored; 6) Matches won; 7) Goal difference; 8) Goals scored; 9) Least red cards; 10) Least yellow cards.
(C) Champions; (O) Play-off winners; (P) Promoted

=== Group 2 ===
Pos	Team	Pld	W	D	L	GF	GA	GD	Pts	Qualification or relegation	SHE	NIS	VĂS	SUC	DRO	REA	OLI	UNG
1	Sheriff-2 Tiraspol (Note: Ineligible for play-offs)	7	5	1	1	24	5	+19	16 (Note: Goal difference: Sheriff-2 : +19, Speranis : +16.)			1–1	—	—	—	—	6–1	4–0
2	Speranis Nisporeni	7	5	1	1	22	6	+16	16	Play-offs	—		2–1	7–0	6–1	—	2–1	—
3	Văsieni (Note: Văsieni completed the season but withdrew from the league prior to the start of the next season.)	7	4	1	2	18	14	+4	13	Play-offs	2–1	—		—	1–2	4–4	—	5–2
4	Sucleia (Note: Sucleia merged with Saksan before the start of the next season.)	7	3	1	3	9	18	−9	10 (Note: Head-to-head points: Sucleia : 3, Speranța : 0.)	Play-offs	1–5	—	2–3		—	2–1	—	—
5	Speranța Drochia	7	3	1	3	10	14	−4	10	Play-offs	0–3	—	—	1–2		—	1–1	—
6	Real Succes	7	2	1	4	9	18	−9	7	Play-offs	0–4	2–1	—	—	1–4		—	0–3
7	Olimp Comrat (Note: Olimp Comrat and FCM Ungheni avoided relegation due to lack of teams.)	7	1	2	4	9	13	−4	5		—	—	1–2	1–1	—	0–1		—
8	FCM Ungheni	7	1	0	6	5	18	−13	3		—	0–3	—	0–1	0–1	—	0–4	

Source: FMF, Soccerway
Legend: Blue = home team win; Yellow = draw; Red = away team win.
Rules for classification: 1) Points; 2) Head-to-head points; 3) Head-to-head goal difference; 4) Head-to-head away goals scored; 5) Head-to-head goals scored; 6) Matches won; 7) Goal difference; 8) Goals scored; 9) Least red cards; 10) Least yellow cards.

== Promotion play-offs ==
=== Bracket ===
First round
6 May 2023
Speranis Nisporeni	4
Speranța Drochia	0
6 May 2023
Văsieni	6
Sucleia	1

Second round
14 May 2023
Dinamo-Auto (a.e.t.) (p)	2 (5)
Speranis Nisporeni	2 (4)
14 May 2023
Spartanii Selemet	7
Real Succes	1
14 May 2023
Florești	2
Văsieni	0
14 May 2023
Victoria Chișinău	6
Fălești	2

Third round
19 May 2023
Dinamo-Auto	2
Spartanii Selemet	0
19 May 2023
Florești	3 (6)
Victoria Chișinău (a.e.t.) (p)	3 (7)

Fourth round
24 May 2023
Dinamo-Auto	5
Victoria Chișinău	1

=== First round ===
6 May 2023	Speranis Nisporeni	4–0	Speranța Drochia	Nisporeni
16:00 EEST	Cristioglo 72'; Stratan 82', 86'; Ploniș 90+3' (pen.)	Report		Stadium: Mircea Eliade; Attendance: 300; Referee: Ion Tudos

6 May 2023	Văsieni	6–1	Sucleia	Suruceni
16:00 EEST	Olaru 32'; Rusu 34', 51', 74'; Pașa 83', 89'	Report	Burțev 80'	Stadium: Suruceni Stadium; Attendance: 150; Referee: Andrei Breguța

=== Second round ===
14 May 2023	Dinamo-Auto	2–2 (a.e.t.) (5–4 p)	Speranis Nisporeni	Tîrnauca
16:00 EEST	Mboula 27'; Ondo 92'	Report	Stratan 57'; Mboula 119' (o.g.)	Stadium: Dinamo-Auto Stadium; Attendance: 100; Referee: Ion Tudos
	Penalties
	Mum (penalty scored); Jacob (penalty scored); Stamov (penalty scored); Essono (penalty scored); Mboula (penalty scored)		(penalty scored) Cojocari; (penalty scored) Ploniș; (penalty scored) Mateescu; (penalty scored) Stratan; (penalty missed) Apostol

14 May 2023	Spartanii Selemet	7–1	Real Succes	Selemet
16:00 EEST	Nazar 35'; Șumchin 45', 68', 76'; Rotaru 46'; Koffi 74'; Mamaliga 84' (pen.)	Report	Tiron 49'	Stadium: Selemet Stadium; Attendance: 50; Referee: Andrei Diordiev

14 May 2023	Florești	2–0	Văsieni	Tiraspol
16:00 EEST	Bulat 85', 90+4'	Report		Stadium: Sheriff Indoor Arena; Attendance: 70; Referee: Stanislav Leu

14 May 2023	Victoria Chișinău	6–2	Fălești	Chișinău
16:00 EEST	Stan 51'; Cebotari 60', 65', 73', 88'; Popescu 75'	Report	Platniuc 45'; Turava 90+2'	Stadium: Joma Arena; Attendance: 50; Referee: Iurie Covtun

=== Third round ===
19 May 2023	Dinamo-Auto	2–0	Spartanii Selemet	Tîrnauca
17:00 EEST	Anomerawami 39'; Kings 52'	Report		Stadium: Dinamo-Auto Stadium; Attendance: 100; Referee: Daniel Luca

19 May 2023	Florești	3–3 (a.e.t.) (6–7 p)	Victoria Chișinău	Tiraspol
17:00 EEST	Mihaliov 3'; Solodovnicov 83'; Picus 108'	Report	Iapară 45+3'; Orbu 50'; Stan 103'	Stadium: Sheriff Indoor Arena; Attendance: 200; Referee: Ion Bîlea
	Penalties
	Osipov (penalty missed); Voropai (penalty scored); Bilinschii (penalty scored); Cemîrtan (penalty scored); Covcenco (penalty scored); Poian (penalty scored); Picus (penalty scored); Mîrza (penalty missed)		(penalty scored) Stan; (penalty scored) Coșcodan; (penalty scored) Molla; (penalty missed) Bânzaru; (penalty scored) Păscăluță; (penalty scored) Sandu; (penalty scored) Cravcescu; (penalty scored) Daniliuc

=== Fourth round ===
24 May 2023	Dinamo-Auto	5–1	Victoria Chișinău	Tîrnauca
17:00 EEST	Ondo 4'; Kings 28', 36'; Bah 54'; Jacob 61'	Report	Păscăluță 79' (pen.)	Stadium: Dinamo-Auto Stadium; Attendance: 150; Referee: Andrei Breguța

== Top goalscorers ==
Rank	Player	Club	Goals
1	(Moldova) Ghenadie Orbu	Victoria	13
1	(Moldova) Dmitri Maneacov	Fălești	13
1	(Moldova) Roman Șumchin	Spartanii	13
1	(Moldova) Marin Stan	Victoria	13
5	(Moldova) Nicolae Porojniuc	Speranis (5) & FCM Ungheni (7)	12
6	(Moldova) Constantin Cebotari	Victoria	11
6	(Moldova) Constantin Iavorschi	Speranis	11

== Clean sheets ==
Rank	Player	Club	Clean sheets
1	(Moldova) Stanislav Ivanov	Florești	10
2	(Moldova) Victor Dodon	Dacia Buiucani	7
3	(Moldova) Roman Dumenco	Sheriff-2	4
3	(Moldova) Oleg Malac	Victoria	4
3	(Moldova) Nicolae Garanovschi	Spartanii	4
3	(Moldova) Ivan Marcov	Dinamo-Auto	4
7	(Moldova) Victor Secrieru	FCM Ungheni	3
7	(Moldova) Artiom Cubani	Speranis	3
9	(Moldova) Sergiu Nicolaev	Speranța	2
