= 2014–15 Moldovan "B" Division =

Moldovan "B" Division
- Season: 2014–15

The 2014–15 Moldovan "B" Division season' was the 24th since its establishment. Was approved new system with three divisions, thus coming back to the system that was used between the 1993–94 and 1995–96 seasons.

== Final standings ==
=== Center ===
Pos	Team	Pld	W	D	L	GF	GA	GD	Pts	Promotion
1	CF Ungheni (C, P)	18	14	2	2	58	21	+37	44	Promotion to Divizia A
2	FC Codru Lozova (P)	18	10	3	5	48	26	+22	33	Promotion to Divizia A
3	Codru Călăraşi Junior	18	10	2	6	49	28	+21	32	
4	ȘSSRF	18	9	5	4	39	32	+7	32	
5	Sinteza Căuşeni	18	7	3	8	28	23	+5	24	
6	Anina-ȘS Anenii Noi	18	7	3	8	30	30	0	24	
7	CFR Ialoveni	18	7	2	9	35	37	−2	23	
8	CSF Cricova	18	6	3	9	27	35	−8	21	
9	Olan Olanești	18	4	2	12	18	46	−28	14	
10	CS Politeh	18	1	5	12	16	70	−54	8	

Source: Moldovan Football Federation (in Romanian)
Rules for classification: 1st points; 2nd head-to-head points; 3rd head-to-head goal difference; 4th goal difference; 5th goals scored; 6th number of wins; 7th Fair play competition
(C) Champions; (P) Promoted

=== North ===
Pos	Team	Pld	W	D	L	GF	GA	GD	Pts	Promotion
1	FC Spicul Chișcăreni (C, P)	22	21	1	0	98	18	+80	64	Promotion to Divizia A
2	FC Iskra Râbnița (P)	22	15	2	5	70	24	+46	47	Promotion to Divizia A
3	FC Sîngerei	22	15	1	6	48	28	+20	46	
4	CS Intersport Sănătăuca	22	12	5	5	35	31	+4	41	
5	FC Floreşti	22	9	4	9	41	39	+2	31	
6	FC Fălești	22	9	3	10	43	45	−2	30	
7	FC Dava Soroca	22	7	7	8	40	53	−13	28	
8	FC Cotiujănii Mari	22	8	2	12	44	73	−29	26	
9	CS Drochia	22	7	3	12	32	43	−11	24	
10	FC Grănicerul	22	5	3	14	22	42	−20	18	
11	FC Teleneşti	22	2	6	14	19	53	−34	12	
12	CF Rîşcani	22	2	3	17	24	67	−43	9	

Source: Moldovan Football Federation (in Romanian)
Rules for classification: 1st points; 2nd head-to-head points; 3rd head-to-head goal difference; 4th goal difference; 5th goals scored; 6th number of wins; 7th Fair play competition
(C) Champions; (P) Promoted

=== South ===
Pos	Team	Pld	W	D	L	GF	GA	GD	Pts	Promotion
1	FC Cahul-2005 (C)	18	15	0	3	52	12	+40	45	
2	FC Prut (P)	18	11	4	3	42	23	+19	37	Promotion to Divizia A
3	Universitatea Agrară	18	11	2	5	40	22	+18	35	
4	FC Congaz	18	11	1	6	34	35	−1	34	
5	FC Maiak Chirsova	18	9	1	8	44	30	+14	28	
6	FC Boldureşti	18	8	2	8	29	32	−3	26	
7	CF Sparta Selemet	18	7	2	9	34	29	+5	23	
8	ȘS Ialoveni	18	4	1	13	15	56	−41	13	
9	FC Slobozia Mare	18	2	4	12	20	36	−16	10	
10	FC Trachia	18	2	3	13	17	53	−36	9	

Source: Moldovan Football Federation (in Romanian)
Rules for classification: 1st points; 2nd head-to-head points; 3rd head-to-head goal difference; 4th goal difference; 5th goals scored; 6th number of wins; 7th Fair play competition
(C) Champions; (P) Promoted
