= 2012–13 Moldovan "B" Division =

Moldovan "B" Division
- Season: 2012–13

The 2012–13 Moldovan "B" Division season' was the 22nd since its establishment. Was approved new system with three divisions, thus coming back to the system that was used between the 1993–94 and 1995–96 seasons.

== Final standings ==
=== Center ===
Pos	Team	Pld	W	D	L	GF	GA	GD	Pts	Promotion
1	FC Viişoara (C)	18	14	1	3	39	16	+23	43	Promotion to 2013–14 Moldovan "A" Division
2	Real Succes-2	18	12	2	4	40	20	+20	38	
3	Academia UTM-2 Chişinău	18	10	4	4	43	19	+24	34	
4	SS2 Narubai	18	7	5	6	30	20	+10	26	
5	Codru Călăraşi	18	7	5	6	27	30	−3	26	
6	Codru Junior	18	7	3	8	26	21	+5	24	
7	Sinteza Căuşeni	18	7	3	8	35	38	−3	24	
8	CSF Cricova	18	5	5	8	24	28	−4	20	
9	Universitatea Agrara	18	4	3	11	24	44	−20	15	
10	Olan Olanești	18	1	1	16	12	64	−52	4	

Source: Moldovan Football Federation (in Romanian)
Rules for classification: 1st points; 2nd head-to-head points; 3rd head-to-head goal difference; 4th goal difference; 5th goals scored; 6th number of wins; 7th Fair play competition
(C) Champions

=== North ===
Pos	Team	Pld	W	D	L	GF	GA	GD	Pts	Promotion
1	CF Rîşcani (C)	16	11	3	2	43	16	+27	36	Promotion to 2013–14 Moldovan "A" Division
2	FC Abus	16	9	3	4	40	24	+16	30	
3	FC Florești	16	7	5	4	27	27	0	26	
4	Flacăra Făleşti	16	7	4	5	20	25	−5	25	
5	FC Teleneşti	16	6	7	3	25	15	+10	25	
6	CS Drochia	16	5	5	6	23	22	+1	20	
7	FC Sîngerei	16	3	6	7	22	28	−6	15	
8	FC Dava Soroca	16	3	3	10	20	40	−20	12	
9	FC Glodeni	16	1	2	13	19	48	−29	5	

Source: Moldovan Football Federation (in Romanian)
Rules for classification: 1st points; 2nd head-to-head points; 3rd head-to-head goal difference; 4th goal difference; 5th goals scored; 6th number of wins; 7th Fair play competition
(C) Champions

=== South ===
Pos	Team	Pld	W	D	L	GF	GA	GD	Pts	Promotion
1	FC Cahul-2005 (C)	12	10	2	0	42	13	+29	32	Promotion to 2013–14 Moldovan "A" Division
2	FC Slobozia Mare Speranta-2	12	6	4	2	30	16	+14	22	
3	FC Prut Leova	12	5	3	4	22	20	+2	18	
4	FC Cimişlia	12	4	3	5	23	24	−1	15	
5	FC Spicul	12	4	1	7	19	27	−8	13	
6	FC Congaz	12	3	1	8	9	32	−23	10	
7	CF Sparta Selemet	12	2	2	8	12	25	−13	8	

Source: Moldovan Football Federation (in Romanian)
Rules for classification: 1st points; 2nd head-to-head points; 3rd head-to-head goal difference; 4th goal difference; 5th goals scored; 6th number of wins; 7th Fair play competition
(C) Champions
