= 2011–12 Moldovan Cup =

Cupa Moldovei

Tournament details
- Country: Moldova

Final positions
- Champions: Milsami Orhei
- Runners-up: CSCA–Rapid

2011-12 Moldovan Cup is the 21st season of the Moldovan annual football tournament. The competition began on 14 September 2011 with the First Preliminary Round and will end with the final held in May 2012. The winner of the competition will qualify for the second qualifying round of the 2012–13 UEFA Europa League.

== First Preliminary Round ==
Entering this round are 30 clubs from the Moldovan "B" Division. These matches took place on 14 September 2011.

| Team 1 | Score | Team 2 |
|---|---|---|
| FC Singerei | 0–4 | FC Veris |
| FC Floreşti | 1–2 | FC Dava Soroca |
| FC Edineţ | 4–3 | CS Drochia |
| CF Rîşcani | 2–5 | FC Glodeni |
| FC Flacăra | 1–2 | CS Moldova-03 |
| Codru Călăraşi | 4–1 | FC Nisporeni |
| FC Teleneşti | 1–2 | CSF Cricova |
| FC Olan | 4–1 | FC Sinteza |
| FC Haiduc | 1–2 | FC Viişoara |
| CS Politeh | 4–0 | FC Codru Junior |
| FC Cimişlia | 1–2 | Universitatea Agrară |
| FC Slobozia Mare | 5–0 | FC Trachia |
| FC Congaz | 3–1 | FC Comrat |
| FC Kolos | 6–1 | Maiak Chirsova |
| CF Sparta | 3–1 | FC Prut |

== Second Preliminary Round ==
The 15 winners from the previous round and 1 club from the Moldovan "B" Division entered this stage of the competition. These matches took place on 28 September 2011.

| Team 1 | Score | Team 2 |
|---|---|---|
| FC Veris | 2–0 | Victoria Bardar |
| FC Edineţ | 5–0 | FC Dava Soroca |
| FC Glodeni | 1–1 (a.e.t.); 6–5 (pen.) | CS Moldova-03 |
| FC Olan | 3–3 (a.e.t.); 4–5 (pen.) | FC Viişoara |
| Codru Călăraşi | 0–3 | CSF Cricova |
| CS Politeh | 2–5 | Universitatea Agrară |
| FC Congaz | 2–3 | FC Slobozia Mare |
| CF Sparta | 0–2 | FC Kolos |

== First round ==
In this round enter teams from "A" Division. They will play against 8 winner teams from the second preliminary round. These matches took place on 12 October 2011.

| Team 1 | Score | Team 2 |
|---|---|---|
| FC Veris | 2–0 | CS Mipan-Voran |
| FC Edineţ | 1–2 | Locomotiv Bălţi |
| FC Glodeni | 2–2 (a.e.t.); 4–5 (pen.) | Lilcora |
| CSF Cricova | 0–1 | Tighina |
| FC Viişoara | 2–3 | Găgăuzia |
| Universitatea Agrară | 3–1 | Intersport-Aroma |
| FC Kolos | 4–1 | Speranţa |
| FC Slobozia Mare | 0–5 | Saxan Ceadîr-Lunga |

== Second round ==
In this round enter 4 teams from National Division. These matches were played on 25 and 26 October 2011.

| Team 1 | Score | Team 2 |
|---|---|---|
| Saxan Ceadîr-Lunga | 3–3 (a.e.t.); 6–5 (pen.) | FC Costuleni |
| Nistru Otaci | 2–1 | Dinamo Auto Tiraspol |
| Academia UTM Chişinău | 1–0 | FC Veris |
| Găgăuzia | 6–3 | Universitatea Agrară |
| FC Kolos | 0–1 | Sfîntul Gheorghe Suruceni |

== Third round ==
In this round entered the five winners from the previous round, the three lucky winners from first round and the remaining eight teams from the National Division. These matches were played on 24 November 2011.

| Team 1 | Score | Team 2 |
|---|---|---|
| Iskra-Stal | 0–1 | Nistru Otaci |
| CSCA–Rapid | 2–1 | Academia UTM Chişinău |
| Locomotiv Bălţi | 0–10 | Sheriff |
| Zimbru | 2–0 | Lilcora |
| Olimpia | 5–0 | Tighina |
| Tiraspol | 6–0 | Saxan Ceadîr-Lunga |
| Sfîntul Gheorghe Suruceni | 2–6 | Dacia |
| Găgăuzia | 1–5 | Milsami Orhei |

== Quarterfinals ==
This round featured the eight winners from the previous round. The matches are to be played on 10 April 2012.

| Team 1 | Score | Team 2 |
|---|---|---|
| CSCA–Rapid | 2–1 | Nistru Otaci |
| Zimbru | 0–1 | Sheriff |
| Dacia | 1–0 | Tiraspol |
| Milsami Orhei | 2–1 (a.e.t.) | Olimpia |

== Semifinals ==
This round featured the four winners from the previous round. The matches are to be played on 14 May 2012.

| Team 1 | Score | Team 2 |
|---|---|---|
| CSCA–Rapid | 1–1(a.e.t.); 4–2 (pen.) | Sheriff |
| Milsami Orhei | 5–4 | Dacia |

== Final ==
The match was scheduled to be played at 27 May 2012.

27 May 2012
17:00 EEST

| CSCA–Rapid | 0 – 0 (a.e.t.) | Milsami Orhei |
Penalties
| | 3 – 5 |

Sheriff Stadium, Tiraspol
Referee: Ghenadie Sidenco

== Top goalscorers ==
Updated to matches played on 19 May 2013.

| Rank | Player | Club | Goals |
|---|---|---|---|
| 1 | (Moldova) Ghenadie Orbu | FC Dacia Chişinău | 3 |
| 1 | (Moldova) Maxim Mihaliov | FC Dacia Chişinău | 3 |
| 1 | (Ukraine) Roland Bilala | FC Tiraspol | 3 |
| 1 | (Serbia) Miral Samardžić | FC Sheriff Tiraspol | 3 |
| 1 | (Brazil) Luvannor Henrique | FC Sheriff Tiraspol | 3 |
