= 2011–12 Moldovan "B" Division =

Moldovan "B" Division
- Season: 2011–12
- Champions: FC Veris; Victoria; Maiak
- Promoted: FC Veris; Victoria; Maiak; FC Edinet

The 2011–12 Moldovan "B" Division season was the 21st since its establishment. A new system was approved with three divisions, thus coming back to the system that was used between the 1993–94 and 1995–96 seasons.

== Final standings ==
=== Center ===
Pos	Team	Pld	W	D	L	GF	GA	GD	Pts	Promotion
1	Victoria Bardar (C, P)	18	15	2	1	57	9	+48	47	Promotion to 2012–13 Moldovan "A" Division
2	FC Viişoara	18	13	2	3	60	16	+44	41	
3	FC Universitatea Agrară	18	9	2	7	38	39	−1	29	
4	Cricova	18	8	5	5	37	25	+12	29	
5	Sinteza Căușeni	18	7	6	5	42	26	+16	27	
6	Politeh Chișinău	18	7	5	6	52	34	+18	26	
7	Codru Juniori	18	7	2	9	27	39	−12	23	
8	Codru Călărași	18	5	4	9	27	40	−13	19	
9	Olan Olanești	18	3	2	13	19	67	−48	11	
10	Haiduc Dubăsarii Vechi	18	0	2	16	21	85	−64	2	
11	FC Nisporeni	0	0	0	0	0	0	0	0	

Source: Moldovan Football Federation (in Romanian)
Rules for classification: 1st points; 2nd head-to-head points; 3rd head-to-head goal difference; 4th goal difference; 5th goals scored; 6th number of wins; 7th Fair play competition
(C) Champions; (P) Promoted

=== North ===
Pos	Team	Pld	W	D	L	GF	GA	GD	Pts	Promotion
1	Veris Drăgăneşti (C, P)	20	20	0	0	84	2	+82	60	Promotion to 2012–13 Moldovan "A" Division
2	Edineț (P)	20	12	2	6	41	22	+19	38	Promotion to 2012–13 Moldovan "A" Division
3	Drochia	20	9	4	7	34	29	+5	31	
4	Rîșcani	20	9	3	8	36	41	−5	30	
5	Glodeni	20	8	5	7	51	49	+2	29	
6	Dava Soroca	20	8	4	8	24	26	−2	28	
7	Florești	20	6	5	9	32	40	−8	23	
8	Flacăra Fălești	20	7	2	11	24	45	−21	23	
9	Sîngerei	20	5	4	11	26	45	−19	19	
10	FC Telenești	20	5	4	11	22	31	−9	19	
11	CS Moldova-03 Ungheni	20	3	3	14	24	68	−44	12	

Source: Moldovan Football Federation (in Romanian)
Rules for classification: 1st points; 2nd head-to-head points; 3rd head-to-head goal difference; 4th goal difference; 5th goals scored; 6th number of wins; 7th Fair play competition
(C) Champions; (P) Promoted

=== South ===
Pos	Team	Pld	W	D	L	GF	GA	GD	Pts	Promotion
1	FC Maiak Chirsova (C, P)	18	13	3	2	44	23	+21	42	Promotion to 2012–13 Moldovan "A" Division
2	FC Univer	18	10	5	3	38	27	+11	35	
3	Slobozia Mare	18	10	4	4	42	21	+21	34	
4	FC Kolos	18	11	1	6	31	21	+10	34	
5	FC Prut Leova	18	5	8	5	28	28	0	23	
6	FC Trachia	18	6	3	9	17	26	−9	21	
7	FC Cimişlia	18	6	2	10	30	32	−2	20	
8	FC Speranta-2	18	5	5	8	22	35	−13	20	
9	FC Congaz	18	4	1	13	21	52	−31	13	
10	CF Sparta Selemet	18	2	4	12	20	43	−23	10	

Source: Moldovan Football Federation (in Romanian)
Rules for classification: 1st points; 2nd head-to-head points; 3rd head-to-head goal difference; 4th goal difference; 5th goals scored; 6th number of wins; 7th Fair play competition
(C) Champions; (P) Promoted
