= 2016–17 Moldovan "B" Division =

Divizia B
- Season: 2016–17

The 2016–17 Moldovan "B" Division (Romanian: Divizia B) was the 26th season of Moldovan football's third-tier league. A total of 29 teams competed in this division. The season began on 27 August 2016 and ended on 2 June 2017.

The league consisted of two regional groups, Nord (North) and Sud (South).

== League table ==
=== North ===
Pos	Team	Pld	W	D	L	GF	GA	GD	Pts	Promotion or relegation
1	Grănicerul Glodeni (C, P)	26	20	5	1	63	15	+48	65	Promotion to Divizia A
2	Intersport Sănătăuca	26	19	7	0	87	8	+79	64	
3	Speranța Drochia	26	18	5	3	74	25	+49	59	
4	Florești	26	17	4	5	59	21	+38	55	
5	Bogzești	26	14	2	10	53	45	+8	44	
6	Maiac Cioropcani	26	12	3	11	56	45	+11	39	
7	Zaria-2 Bălți	26	10	5	11	45	42	+3	35	
8	Cruiz Camenca	26	10	3	13	38	39	−1	33	
9	Fălești	26	9	4	13	24	65	−41	31	
10	Rîșcani	26	7	7	12	42	61	−19	28	
11	Cricova	26	7	1	18	30	61	−31	22	
12	Nistru Otaci	26	4	5	17	22	63	−41	17 (Note: Nistru ahead of Orhei Star on head-to-head points: Nistru–Orhei Star 4–0, Orhei Star–Nistru 1–1)	withdrew (Note: Nistru Otaci completed the season but withdrew from the league prior to the start of the next season.)
13	Orhei Star	26	4	5	17	16	59	−43	17	withdrew (Note: Orhei Star completed the season but withdrew from the league prior to the start of the next season.)
14	Dava Soroca	26	2	2	22	12	72	−60	8	withdrew (Note: Dava Soroca completed the season but withdrew from the league prior to the start of the next season.)

Source: Soccerway
Rules for classification: 1) Points; 2) Head-to-head points; 3) Head-to-head goal difference; 4) Head-to-head away goals scored; 5) Head-to-head goals scored; 6) Matches won; 7) Goal difference; 8) Goals scored; 9) Fairplay ranking.
1. Cotiujenii Mari were officially withdrawn from the league on 30 September 2016 and their results were annulled.
(C) Champions; (P) Promoted

=== Results ===
Home \ Away	NIS	ZAR	RÎȘ	DAV	FLO	ORH	FĂL	CRI	GRĂ	SPE	BOG	INT	MAI	CRU
Nistru Otaci		1–2	1–1	1–0	1–3	4–0	3–2	0–2	0–1	1–4	1–1	0–7	0–1	3–1
Zaria-2 Bălți	3–1		2–0	5–0	0–1	3–0	6–0	2–1	1–3	2–3	2–1	1–1	2–4	2–1
Rîșcani	4–0	1–1		2–2	1–3	0–0	0–1	3–0	1–4	0–4	2–3	1–5	1–1	2–1
Dava Soroca	2–0	1–3	0–5		0–4	1–3	0–1	0–1	0–3	0–4	0–2	0–4	1–3	1–0
Florești	1–0	1–0	2–4	5–0		4–0	3–0	5–1	1–1	0–0	2–0	1–1	2–0	1–0
Orhei Star	1–1	0–0	0–1	1–0	0–4		1–1	1–0	1–3	0–1	1–4	0–5	0–3	3–0
Fălești	2–0	1–1	2–2	0–0	0–6	1–0		2–0	0–6	0–5	1–3	0–3	1–2	1–4
Cricova	1–1	3–2	3–0	2–0	0–1	4–1	0–2		0–5	2–5	3–5	0–3	0–5	2–1
Grănicerul Glodeni	3–0	4–1	2–0	5–0	3–1	3–0	2–0	1–0		1–0	0–1	1–1	4–3	1–1
Speranța Drochia	3–1	1–1	4–1	4–2	2–0	7–0	7–0	2–1	0–1		4–2	0–0	4–0	1–3
Bogzești	3–0	4–1	3–3	2–0	0–6	2–1	1–2	4–3	1–2	1–2		0–2	2–0	0–1
Intersport Sănătăuca	13–1	2–0	8–1	5–1	3–0	0–0	9–0	3–0	0–0	1–1	3–0		2–0	3–0
Maiac Cioropcani	1–1	4–1	2–3	4–0	4–2	4–2	1–3	6–1	2–2	3–4	0–4	0–1		3–1
Cruiz Camenca	1–0	3–1	7–3	3–1	0–0	3–0	0–1	1–0	0–2	2–2	3–4	0–2	1–0	

Source: Soccerway
Legend: Blue = home team win; Yellow = draw; Red = away team win.

=== South ===
Pos	Team	Pld	W	D	L	GF	GA	GD	Pts	Promotion or relegation
1	Cahul-2005 (C, P)	26	21	1	4	91	26	+65	64 (Note: Cahul-2005 ahead of Sparta on head-to-head points: Sparta–Cahul-2005 0–1, Cahul-2005–Sparta 2–1)	Promotion to Divizia A
2	Sparta Chișinău	26	21	1	4	100	22	+78	64	
3	Maiak Chirsova	26	15	4	7	79	43	+36	49	
4	Sinteza Căușeni	26	14	4	8	69	41	+28	46	
5	Ceadîr-Lunga	26	13	4	9	75	48	+27	43	
6	Congaz	26	13	3	10	64	46	+18	42	
7	Sireți	26	11	6	9	59	54	+5	39	
8	Anina Anenii Noi	26	11	5	10	46	47	−1	38	
9	Slobozia Mare	26	10	3	13	67	67	0	33	
10	CFR Ialoveni	26	8	3	15	42	54	−12	27	withdrew (Note: CFR Ialoveni completed the season but withdrew from the league prior to the start of the next season.)
11	Codru-Juniori	26	7	5	14	32	63	−31	26	
12	Boldurești	26	7	1	18	29	66	−37	22	
13	Politeh Chișinău	26	6	1	19	27	128	−101	19	withdrew (Note: Politeh Chișinău completed the season but withdrew from the league prior to the start of the next season.)
14	Trachia Taraclia (R)	26	3	3	20	20	95	−75	12	Relegation to regional level

Source: Soccerway
Rules for classification: 1) Points; 2) Head-to-head points; 3) Head-to-head goal difference; 4) Head-to-head away goals scored; 5) Head-to-head goals scored; 6) Matches won; 7) Goal difference; 8) Goals scored; 9) Fairplay ranking.
(C) Champions; (P) Promoted; (R) Relegated

=== Results ===
Home \ Away	CAH	POL	MAI	SLO	COD	SIN	TRA	CON	SIR	BOL	ANI	CEA	IAL	SPA
Cahul-2005		7–0	2–0	7–1	1–1	5–1	8–0	6–0	2–1	4–0	1–2	4–0	8–1	2–1
Politeh Chișinău	1–8		2–1	2–11	0–2	3–6	5–1	1–6	2–2	1–0	1–2	1–4	3–0	0–5
Maiak Chirsova	1–3	12–0		3–1	3–1	1–1	5–1	2–5	4–2	7–0	7–1	1–0	2–3	1–0
Slobozia Mare	2–3	1–0	2–4		3–0	2–6	4–1	3–2	1–1	7–1	7–3	0–2	3–2	0–2
Codru-Juniori	0–2	2–1	1–1	2–2		2–1	1–2	1–5	5–1	3–0	1–1	1–1	2–3	0–3
Sinteza Căușeni	0–2	1–2	2–4	2–1	5–0		8–0	5–0	3–0	5–1	4–1	3–2	0–1	1–3
Trachia Taraclia	0–4	0–1	1–3	2–3	0–2	0–3		1–2	4–4	1–2	0–0	0–0	1–0	2–4
Congaz	4–3	4–0	0–2	3–0	4–0	3–3	2–0		0–1	5–0	3–1	1–1	2–0	1–3
Sireți	5–3	7–0	2–3	4–2	2–1	1–1	5–0	1–4		1–0	2–5	3–4	1–1	1–6
Boldurești	0–1	7–0	4–4	1–2	3–1	0–1	3–1	1–0	0–3		2–1	0–4	3–0	0–1
Anina Anenii Noi	1–2	4–0	0–4	1–1	4–0	0–0	3–0	1–1	0–4	2–0		4–0	3–1	3–1
Ceadîr-Lunga	3–0	13–1	2–0	5–3	7–0	2–4	5–0	4–3	2–3	7–0	2–3		1–1	1–6
CFR Ialoveni	1–2	10–0	3–3	4–3	0–1	0–3	1–2	5–4	0–1	2–0	1–0	1–2		1–3
Sparta Chișinău	0–1	12–0	4–1	4–2	8–2	5–0	17–0	1–0	1–1	2–1	2–0	5–1	1–0	

Source: Soccerway
Legend: Blue = home team win; Yellow = draw; Red = away team win.
