= 2020–21 Moldovan "A" Division =

Divizia A
- Season: 2020–21
- Dates: 24 July 2020 – 25 May 2021
- Champions: Bălți
- Promoted: Bălți
- Relegated: Grănicerul; Fălești
- Matches: 182
- Goals: 713 (3.92 per match)
- Top goalscorer: Clement Godday (25 goals)
- Best goalkeeper: Dmitrii Burac (8 clean sheets)
- Biggest home win: Victoria 9–0 Sireți (5 September 2020); Real Succes 9–0 Sireți (21 May 2021)
- Biggest away win: Sireți 0–11 Bălți (16 May 2021)
- Highest scoring: Sireți 4–9 Fălești (25 May 2021)
- Longest winning run: 9 matches Bălți
- Longest unbeaten run: 12 matches Cahul-2005
- Longest winless run: 12 matches Sireți
- Longest losing run: 9 matches Sireți

The 2020–21 Moldovan "A" Division (Romanian: Divizia A) was the 30th season of Moldovan football's second-tier league. The season started on 24 July 2020 and ended on 25 May 2021.

== Teams ==

Club	Location
Bălți	Bălți
Cahul-2005	Cahul
Fălești	Fălești
Grănicerul	Glodeni
Iskra	Rîbnița
Olimp	Comrat
Real Succes	Chișinău
Sheriff-2	Tiraspol
Sireți	Sireți
Spartanii	Selemet
Speranța	Drochia
Sucleia	Sucleia
Tighina	Bender
Victoria	Chișinău

== Season summary ==
=== League table ===
Pos	Team	Pld	W	D	L	GF	GA	GD	Pts	Promotion or relegation
1	Bălți (C, P)	26	23	0	3	85	17	+68	69	Promotion to Divizia Națională
2	Cahul-2005 (Note: Cahul-2005 had the opportunity to be promoted but the club did not apply for the National club license for the 2021–22 Divizia Națională season.)	26	18	3	5	70	23	+47	57	
3	Sheriff-2 Tiraspol	26	17	3	6	46	24	+22	54	Ineligible for promotion
4	Spartanii Selemet	26	14	4	8	57	42	+15	46 (Note: Spartanii ahead of Sucleia on head-to-head points: Spartanii : 6, Sucleia : 0.)	
5	Sucleia	26	14	4	8	64	38	+26	46	
6	Speranța Drochia	26	12	6	8	49	41	+8	42	
7	Olimp Comrat	26	11	5	10	51	44	+7	38	
8	Iskra Rîbnița	26	9	8	9	53	49	+4	35	
9	Tighina	26	9	3	14	42	61	−19	30	withdrew (Note: Tighina completed the season but withdrew from the league prior to the start of the next season.)
10	Real Succes	26	7	7	12	44	35	+9	28	
11	Victoria Chișinău	26	7	5	14	61	65	−4	26	
12	Grănicerul Glodeni (Note: Grănicerul Glodeni have been relegated voluntarily due to financial reasons and will be taking part in the third tier league next season.) (R)	26	7	1	18	25	61	−36	22	Relegation to Divizia B
13	Fălești (R)	26	6	0	20	40	92	−52	18	Relegation to Divizia B
14	Sireți	26	2	3	21	26	121	−95	9	withdrew (Note: As per regulations, the fourteenth placed team, Sireți was to be relegated to Divizia B, but the club withdrew before the start of the next season.)

Source: FMF, Soccerway
Rules for classification: 1) Points; 2) Head-to-head points; 3) Head-to-head goal difference; 4) Head-to-head away goals scored; 5) Head-to-head goals scored; 6) Matches won; 7) Goal difference; 8) Goals scored; 9) Less red cards; 10) Less yellow cards.
(C) Champions; (P) Promoted; (R) Relegated

=== Results ===
Teams will play each other twice (once home, once away).

Home \ Away	BĂL	CAH	FĂL	GRĂ	ISK	OLI	REA	SHE	SIR	SPA	SPE	SUC	TIG	VIC
Bălți	—	3–1	0–2	2–1	1–0	3–0	4–2	1–0	5–0	4–0	3–0	7–0	4–0	4–1
Cahul-2005	1–2	—	1–0	1–0	3–0	0–0	0–0	4–1	3–0	2–2	2–0	1–0	1–0	6–0
Fălești	0–6	1–10	—	1–2	1–5	3–5	0–3	1–2	1–3	1–4	0–7	2–0	4–1	3–2
Grănicerul Glodeni	0–3	1–3	2–0	—	1–5	4–3	0–1	0–1	1–0	1–2	0–1	0–4	0–4	0–4
Iskra Rîbnița	1–2	2–4	3–1	3–1	—	3–3	2–1	1–2	1–1	2–1	2–2	4–1	2–1	1–1
Olimp Comrat	0–2	0–1	4–0	4–1	1–1	—	0–0	2–3	5–0	2–3	3–1	3–2	2–1	4–1
Real Succes	0–3	1–3	1–2	7–2	1–1	1–1	—	0–2	9–0	2–1	1–1	0–1	0–1	2–3
Sheriff-2 Tiraspol	0–3	1–0	2–1	3–1	1–0	3–1	2–1	—	8–0	0–0	4–0	0–3	4–0	2–0
Sireți	0–11	2–9	4–9	0–2	4–4	1–2	1–2	1–0	—	0–4	2–3	0–9	1–6	3–7
Spartanii Selemet	4–2	0–5	8–2	0–1	4–2	0–1	2–1	1–1	1–1	—	2–0	3–1	1–4	1–0
Speranța Drochia	1–0	1–3	3–1	1–0	3–2	6–1	1–0	1–1	5–2	5–1	—	0–3	1–3	1–0
Sucleia	1–3	1–0	4–2	5–0	5–1	2–0	1–1	1–0	3–0 (Note: Sireți received a 0–3 technical loss in a away game against Sucleia for fielding an ineligible player. The original match ended in a 5–2 victory for Sucleia.)	1–2	1–1	—	2–2	1–1
Tighina	0–3	1–3	6–1	3–3	0–2	1–0	0–6	0–1	2–0	0–3	2–2	1–6	—	3–1
Victoria Chișinău	2–4	4–3	4–1	0–1	3–3	1–4	1–1	1–2	9–0	1–7	2–2	4–6	8–0	—

Source: FMF (in Romanian)
Legend: Blue = home team win; Yellow = draw; Red = away team win.

== Results by round ==
The following table represents the teams game results in each round.

Team	1	2	3	4	5	6	7	8	9	10	11	12	13	14	15	16	17	18	19	20	21	22	23	24	25	26
Bălți	W	W	W	W	W	W	W	L	W	W	W	L	W	W	W	W	W	W	W	W	W	L	W	W	W	W
Cahul-2005	L	W	W	L	W	W	D	W	W	W	W	W	W	W	D	W	L	D	W	W	W	W	W	L	W	L
Fălești	L	W	L	L	L	L	L	W	W	L	L	L	L	L	L	L	L	W	L	L	L	L	L	L	W	W
Grănicerul Glodeni	L	L	W	W	L	W	L	W	W	L	L	L	L	L	L	W	L	D	W	L	L	L	L	L	L	L
Iskra Rîbnița	L	W	L	D	L	D	W	L	W	D	D	D	W	L	L	L	D	L	W	W	W	W	D	L	D	W
Olimp Comrat	L	L	W	D	L	L	W	D	L	W	L	L	L	W	D	W	D	W	L	W	D	W	W	L	W	W
Real Succes	D	W	L	L	L	D	L	D	L	L	W	L	D	L	W	L	D	D	L	L	D	W	W	W	W	L
Sheriff-2 Tiraspol	W	L	W	W	D	W	W	D	W	W	W	L	L	W	L	W	W	D	W	L	W	W	W	W	L	W
Sireți	L	L	L	L	L	L	L	L	L	D	L	L	W	D	L	L	L	L	L	W	L (Note: Technical loss)	L	D	L	L	L
Spartanii Selemet	W	W	W	L	D	W	D	W	L	W	W	W	L	D	W	L	W	D	W	L	L	W	L	W	L	W
Speranța Drochia	W	L	L	W	W	W	W	D	D	L	D	W	D	W	D	W	W	L	D	W	L	L	L	W	L	W
Sucleia	W	L	L	W	W	L	D	W	D	W	W	W	W	L	W	L	D	L	L	W	W (Note: Technical win)	W	D	W	W	L
Tighina	W	W	W	W	W	L	D	L	L	L	W	W	W	L	W	D	L	D	L	L	L	L	L	L	L	L
Victoria Chișinău	D	L	L	L	W	L	L	L	L	L	L	D	L	W	W	L	W	W	D	L	W	L	D	W	D	L

== Top goalscorers ==
Rank	Player	Club	Goals
1	(Nigeria) Clement Godday	Sucleia	25
2	(Ukraine) Serhii Molochko	Bălți	24
3	(Moldova) Roman Șumchin	Cahul-2005	18
4	(Moldova) Mihai Țurcan	Speranța	17
5	(Moldova) Octavian Onofrei	Spartanii	15
6	(Moldova) Nichita Moțpan	Bălți	13
6	(Moldova) Vasile Noroc	Speranța	13
6	(Moldova) Ghenadie Orbu	Victoria	13
6	(Moldova) Iuri Stancev	Cahul-2005	13
6	(Moldova) Evgheni Țiverenco	Tighina	13

== Clean sheets ==
Rank	Player	Club	Clean sheets
1	(Moldova) Dmitrii Burac	Bălți	8
2	(Nigeria) Kelvin Enyeribe	Bălți	6
2	(Moldova) Ruslan Istrati	Sucleia	6
4	(Moldova) Mihail Cioban	Sheriff-2	5
4	(Moldova) Denis Cristofovici	Grănicerul	5
4	(Moldova) Nicolae Garanovschi	Real Succes	5
4	(Moldova) Nicolae Țurcan	Iskra (1) & Cahul-2005 (4)	5
8	(Moldova) Anton Coval	Tighina	4
8	(Moldova) Dan Stancov	Cahul-2005	4
10	(Moldova) Vladislav Chiaburu	Speranța	3
10	(Moldova) Dmitri Cîlcic	Olimp	3
10	(Moldova) Pavel Galac	Spartanii	3
10	(Moldova) Alexei Samoilenco	Sheriff-2	3
