= 2006–07 Moldovan Cup =

Cupa Moldovei

Tournament details
- Country: Moldova

Final positions
- Champions: Zimbru
- Runners-up: Nistru

The 2006–07 Moldovan Cup was the 16th season of the Moldovan annual football cup competition. The competition started on 27 August 2006 with the preliminary round and ended with the final held on 9 May 2007.

== Preliminary round ==
20 teams entered this round. The games were played on 27 August 2006.

Team 1	Score	Team 2
Flacăra	1–0	Glodeni
Florești	0–7	Locomotiva
Vierul	4–1	Telenești
Podiș	1–0	Viitorul
Steaua	0–4	Petrocub
Crasbil	5–1	Victoria
Cricova	0–1	Fortuna
Slobozia Mare	2–5	Cahul-2005
Trachia	4–5	Kolos
Sinteza	1–0	Scânteia

== First round ==
The ten winners from the previous round entered this round, in addition to 12 new teams. The games were played on 5 September 2006.

Team 1	Score	Team 2
Viișoara	2–0	Iskra-Stal
Flacăra	2–2 (6–5 p)	Moldova-03
Locomotiva	1–3	Rapid
Vierul	w/o	Izvoraș-67
Podiș	2–2 (4–3 p)	CSCA
Petrocub	3–1	Academia
Crasbil	3–0	Energhetic
Fortuna	2–3	Floreni
Cahul-2005	4–0	Găgăuziya
Kolos	4–4 (5–3 p)	Intersport-Aroma
Sinteza	1–12	Olimpia

== Intermediate round ==
The games were played on 19 September 2006.

Team 1	Score	Team 2
Izvoraș-67	0–2	Rapid
Podiș	2–1	Petrocub
Crasbil	0–1	Floreni

== Round of 16 ==
The games were played on 27 and 28 September 2006.

Team 1	Score	Team 2
Sheriff	11–1	Viișoara
Tiligul-Tiras	12–0	Flacăra
Zimbru	2–0	Rapid
Floreni	2–2 (3–4 p)	Dinamo
Cahul-2005	0–2	Tiraspol
Kolos	1–2	Dacia
Olimpia	0–3	Nistru
Podiș	0–3	Politehnica

== Quarter-finals ==
The first legs were played on 18 and 19 October 2006. The second legs were played on 1 November 2006.

Team 1	Agg.	Team 2	1st leg	2nd leg
Tiligul-Tiras	0–4	Sheriff	0–0	0–4
Zimbru	4–0	Politehnica	4–0	0–0
Tiraspol	3–3 (a)	Dinamo	1–1	2–2
Dacia	3–3 (a)	Nistru	3–1	0–2

== Semi-finals ==
The first legs were played on 7 April 2007. The second legs were played on 22 and 23 April 2007.

Team 1	Agg.	Team 2	1st leg	2nd leg
Zimbru	3–2	Sheriff	2–1	1–1
Nistru	3–1	Tiraspol	1–0	2–1

== Final ==
9 May 2007

Zimbru	1–0	Nistru
Cojocari 89'	Report

Zimbru Stadium, Chișinău
Attendance: 5,000
Referee: Mario Vlk
