= 2017 Moldovan "A" Division =

Season of Moldovan football league

Divizia A
- Season: 2017
- Champions: Victoria Chișinău
- Matches: 114
- Goals: 403 (3.54 per match)
- Top goalscorer: Ghenadie Orbu (19 goals)

The 2017 Moldovan "A" Division (Romanian: Divizia A) was the 27th season of Moldovan football's second-tier league. A total of 13 teams competed in this division. Sheriff-2 Tiraspol were the defending champions. The season began on 14 July 2017 and ended on 25 November 2017.

== Teams ==
Location of teams in 2017 Divizia A

Club	Location
Cahul-2005	Cahul
Codru	Lozova
Edineț	Edineț
Grănicerul	Glodeni
Iskra	Rîbnița
Real Succes	Chișinău
Saxan	Ceadîr-Lunga
Sheriff-2	Tiraspol
Sîngerei	Sîngerei
Sparta	Selemet
Ungheni	Ungheni
Victoria	Chișinău
Zimbru-2	Chișinău

== Format ==
In the initial phase of the season, each of the thirteen teams play the other twelve teams one time. After 12 rounds, the league splits into two sections, a top six and a bottom seven, with each team playing all the other teams in their section once.

=== League table ===
Pos	Team	Pld	W	D	L	GF	GA	GD	Pts	Promotion or relegation
1	Victoria Chișinău (Note: As per regulations, Victoria Chișinău was to be promoted but the club did not apply on time for the National club license for the 2018 Divizia Națională season. Received a license on 29 March 2018, 3 days before the start of the next season) (C)	17	12	3	2	40	19	+21	39	
2	Sheriff-2 Tiraspol	17	11	5	1	56	17	+39	38	withdrew (Note: Sheriff-2 Tiraspol completed the season but withdrew from the league prior to the start of the next season.)
3	Grănicerul Glodeni	17	8	7	2	32	16	+16	31	
4	Sparta Selemet	17	7	6	4	38	33	+5	27	withdrew (Note: Sparta Selemet completed the season but withdrew from the league prior to the start of the next season.)
5	Sîngerei	17	6	5	6	26	31	−5	23	
6	Cahul-2005	17	6	4	7	43	44	−1	22	
7	Zimbru-2 Chișinău	18	9	3	6	37	25	+12	30	withdrew (Note: Zimbru-2 Chișinău completed the season but withdrew from the league prior to the start of the next season.)
8	Iskra Rîbnița	18	7	3	8	26	30	−4	24	
9	Real Succes	18	6	1	11	23	42	−19	19	
10	Ungheni	18	4	6	8	26	33	−7	18	
11	Codru Lozova (Note: As per regulations, the eleventh placed team, Codru Lozova was to be relegated to Divizia B, but the club spared relegation due to lack of teams.)	18	3	5	10	24	41	−17	14	
12	Saxan (Note: Saxan were deducted six points for failing to fulfill financial obligations. As per regulations, the twelfth placed team, Saxan was to be relegated to Divizia B, but the club spared relegation due to lack of teams.)	18	4	6	8	19	30	−11	12	
13	Edineț (R)	18	3	2	13	13	42	−29	11	Relegation to Divizia B

Source: Soccerway
Rules for classification: 1) Points; 2) Head-to-head points; 3) Head-to-head goal difference; 4) Head-to-head away goals scored; 5) Head-to-head goals scored; 6) Matches won; 7) Goal difference; 8) Goals scored; 9) Less yellow cards; 10) Less red cards.
(C) Champions; (R) Relegated

== Results ==
=== Matches 1–12 ===
Teams play every other team once (either at home or away).

Home \ Away	CAH	COD	EDI	GRĂ	ISK	REA	SAX	SHE	SÎN	SPA	UNG	VIC	ZIM
Cahul-2005	—	1–0	—	3–3	2–3	7–2	—	—	—	—	3–1	4–4	—
Codru Lozova	—	—	2–3	2–2	3–3	—	2–0	—	—	—	2–2	1–2	—
Edineț	1–4	—	—	—	—	—	1–1	0–2	1–2	0–5	—	—	0–2
Grănicerul Glodeni	—	—	2–0	—	—	—	4–0	2–2	—	1–1	—	0–1	1–0
Iskra Rîbnița	—	—	2–0	1–3	—	—	1–0	1–2	—	—	2–1	1–2	—
Real Succes	—	1–0	3–0	0–3	1–2	—	—	—	—	—	1–1	0–5	—
Saxan	3–3	—	—	—	—	1–0	—	1–1	1–1	1–4	—	—	2–2
Sheriff-2 Tiraspol	4–0	5–1	—	—	—	6–0	—	—	6–0	7–1	—	—	2–2
Sîngerei	0–2	5–0	—	0–0	3–1	3–1	—	—	—	—	3–1	—	—
Sparta Selemet	4–1	2–2	—	—	3–0	3–1	—	—	1–1	—	3–3	—	—
Ungheni	—	—	2–0	1–1	—	—	1–2	3–3	—	—	—	2–3	2–1
Victoria Chișinău	—	—	4–1	—	—	—	4–1	1–0	1–1	1–2	—	—	6–2
Zimbru-2 Chișinău	1–3	6–0	—	—	4–1	4–1	—	—	5–0	0–0	—	—	—

Source: Soccerway
Legend: Blue = home team win; Yellow = draw; Red = away team win.

=== Matches 13–17 ===
Teams play every other team once (either at home or away).

==== Top six ====
Home \ Away	CAH	GRĂ	SHE	SÎN	SPA	VIC
Cahul-2005	—	—	—	—	3–3	1–3
Grănicerul Glodeni	5–3	—	1–2	—	—	—
Sheriff-2 Tiraspol	4–1	—	—	3–1	6–1	—
Sîngerei	3–2	0–0	—	—	—	—
Sparta Selemet	—	0–2	—	5–3	—	0–1
Victoria Chișinău	—	0–2	1–1	1–0	—	—

Source: Soccerway
Legend: Blue = home team win; Yellow = draw; Red = away team win.

=== Matches 13–18 ===
Teams play every other team once (either at home or away).

==== Bottom seven ====
Home \ Away	COD	EDI	ISK	REA	SAX	UNG	ZIM
Codru Lozova	—	—	—	1–2	3–1	—	2–3
Edineț	2–1	—	1–1	—	—	0–1	—
Iskra Rîbnița	0–1	—	—	—	—	2–1	1–2
Real Succes	—	4–1	1–4	—	—	4–0	—
Saxan	—	3–0	0–0	0–1	—	—	—
Ungheni	1–1	—	—	—	1–2	—	2–0
Zimbru-2 Chișinău	—	1–2	—	1–0	1–0	—	—

Source: Soccerway
Legend: Blue = home team win; Yellow = draw; Red = away team win.

== Top goalscorers ==
Rank	Player	Club	Goals
1	(Moldova) Ghenadie Orbu	Victoria	19
2	(Moldova) Eugeniu Rebenja	Sheriff-2	15
2	(Moldova) Marin Căruntu	Sheriff-2	15
4	(Moldova) Roman Șumchin	Cahul-2005	10
4	(Moldova) Dmitri Maneacov	Grănicerul	10
6	(Moldova) Ion Pavlov	Sparta	9
7	(Moldova) Ion Ibrian	Real Succes	8
7	(Moldova) Ion Donțu	Zimbru-2	8
7	(Moldova) Andrei Cobeț	Sheriff-2	8
7	(Moldova) Serghei Ciuico	Ungheni	8
7	(Moldova) Mihai Țurcan	Codru	8
7	(Moldova) Ionel Mirciu	Codru	8
