= 2010–11 Moldovan "B" Division =

Moldovan "B" Division
- Season: 2010–11
- Champions: Orhei Star; Victoria; Saxan
- Promoted: Saxan

The 2010–11 Moldovan "B" Division season' was the 20th since its establishment. Was approved new system with three divisions, thus coming back to the system that was used between the 1993–94 and 1995–96 seasons.

== Final standings ==
=== North ===
Pos	Team	Pld	W	D	L	GF	GA	GD	Pts
1	Orhei Star (C)	18	12	4	2	28	10	+18	40
2	Glodeni	18	9	5	4	31	23	+8	32
3	Dava Soroca	18	9	4	5	30	21	+9	31
4	Florești	18	9	3	6	25	16	+9	30
5	FC Telenești	18	8	4	6	24	20	+4	28
6	FC Nisporeni	18	7	4	7	33	27	+6	25 (Note: RIS 1–3 NIS; NIS 1–3 RIS)
7	Rîșcani	18	7	4	7	21	19	+2	25
8	Drochia	18	4	7	7	21	33	−12	19
9	Flacăra Fălești	18	3	4	11	15	33	−18	13
10	Codru Călărași	18	1	3	14	14	40	−26	6

Source: Moldovan Football Federation (in Romanian)
Rules for classification: 1st points; 2nd head-to-head points; 3rd head-to-head goal difference; 4th goal difference; 5th goals scored; 6th number of wins; 7th Fair play competition
(C) Champions

=== Center ===
Pos	Team	Pld	W	D	L	GF	GA	GD	Pts
1	Victoria Bardar (C)	18	17	0	1	89	14	+75	51
2	Izvoraş-67	18	12	2	4	43	20	+23	38
3	FC Universitatea Agrară	18	11	2	5	40	23	+17	35 (Note: UNA 2–1 CRI; CRI 1–0 UNA)
4	Cricova	18	11	2	5	36	22	+14	35
5	FC Viişoara	18	10	1	7	70	26	+44	31
6	Sinteza Căușeni	18	9	0	9	52	34	+18	27
7	Olan Olanești	18	5	5	8	35	39	−4	20
8	CS Criuleni	18	4	1	13	26	78	−52	13
9	FC Cimișlia	18	2	3	13	24	65	−41	9
10	Locomotiva Basarabească	18	0	2	16	15	109	−94	2

Source: Moldovan Football Federation (in Romanian)
Rules for classification: 1st points; 2nd head-to-head points; 3rd head-to-head goal difference; 4th goal difference; 5th goals scored; 6th number of wins; 7th Fair play competition
(C) Champions

=== South ===
Pos	Team	Pld	W	D	L	GF	GA	GD	Pts	Promotion
1	Saxan Ceadîr-Lunga (C, P)	18	13	1	4	42	19	+23	40	Promotion to 2011–12 Moldovan "A" Division
2	Maiak Chirsova	18	11	2	5	38	27	+11	35	
3	FC Comrat	18	9	6	3	18	14	+4	33 (Note: TRA 1–1 COM; COM 1–0 TRA)	
4	Trachia Taraclia	18	9	6	3	26	12	+14	33	
5	Slobozia Mare	18	8	4	6	53	27	+26	28	
6	Prut Leova	18	7	5	6	29	16	+13	26	
7	Congaz	18	6	2	10	17	32	−15	20	
8	Kolos Copceac	18	4	4	10	22	34	−12	16	
9	Alifomix Cania	18	4	3	11	22	37	−15	15	
10	FC Vulcănești	18	1	3	14	16	65	−49	6	

Source: Moldovan Football Federation (in Romanian)
Rules for classification: 1st points; 2nd head-to-head points; 3rd head-to-head goal difference; 4th goal difference; 5th goals scored; 6th number of wins; 7th Fair play competition
(C) Champions; (P) Promoted
