= 2019 Moldovan "B" Division =

Divizia B
- Season: 2019
- Dates: 27 April 2019 – 26 October 2019

The 2019 Moldovan "B" Division (Romanian: Divizia B) was the 29th season of Moldovan football's third-tier league. The season started on 27 April 2019 and ended on 26 October 2019. The league consisted of three regional groups, Nord (North), Centru (Centre) and Sud (South).

== North ==
Pos	Team	Pld	W	D	L	GF	GA	GD	Pts	Promotion or relegation
1	Fălești (C, P)	18	15	1	2	49	21	+28	46 (Note: Fălești ahead of Edineț on head-to-head points: Edineț–Fălești 1–2, Fălești–Edineț 2–0)	Promotion to Divizia A
2	Edineț	18	15	1	2	78	17	+61	46	
3	Inter Soroca	18	11	3	4	47	32	+15	36	
4	Pepeni	18	10	3	5	41	34	+7	33	
5	Intersport Sănătăuca	18	6	4	8	28	37	−9	22	withdrew (Note: Intersport Sănătăuca completed the season but withdrew from the league prior to the start of the next season.)
6	Rîșcani	18	6	3	9	34	55	−21	21	
7	Cruiz Plus	18	4	4	10	30	35	−5	16 (Note: Cruiz Plus ahead of Academia Viitorul on head-to-head points: Cruiz–Academia 1–0, Academia–Cruiz 0–0)	
8	Academia Viitorul	18	4	4	10	25	41	−16	16	
9	Rezina	18	3	3	12	16	51	−35	12	withdrew (Note: Rezina completed the season but withdrew from the league prior to the start of the next season.)
10	Sporting Natalievca (Note: As per regulations, the tenth placed team, Sporting Natalievca was to be relegated to regional level, but the club spared relegation.)	18	3	0	15	30	55	−25	9	

Source: FMF, Soccerway
Rules for classification: 1) Points; 2) Head-to-head points; 3) Head-to-head goal difference; 4) Head-to-head away goals scored; 5) Head-to-head goals scored; 6) Matches won; 7) Goal difference; 8) Goals scored; 9) Less red cards; 10) Less yellow cards.
(C) Champions; (P) Promoted

=== Results ===
The schedule consists of two rounds, each team plays each other once home-and-away for a total of 18 matches per team.

Home \ Away	ACA	CRU	EDI	FĂL	SĂN	SOR	PEP	REZ	RÎȘ	SPO
Academia Viitorul	—	0–0	5–6	0–3	0–0	1–4	2–3	4–1	0–3	1–0
Cruiz Plus	1–0	—	1–3	4–2	2–2	1–3	4–5	1–2	2–2	2–0
Edineț	6–0	6–1	—	1–2	8–0	8–2	6–1	9–0	5–0	2–0
Fălești	5–0	2–1	2–0	—	2–0	3–1	1–1	2–0	4–3	4–2
Intersport Sănătăuca	0–1	1–0	1–3	2–1	—	1–1	0–1	0–1	1–4	4–3
Inter Soroca	0–0	2–1	1–3	1–2	2–2	—	3–0	3–1	5–2	3–2
Pepeni	2–1	2–1	0–0	3–4	3–2	1–4	—	2–2	7–1	5–0
Rezina	3–3	0–6	1–3	0–1	0–3	0–3	0–2	—	0–2	2–1
Rîșcani	3–2	1–1	0–7	1–6	2–3	0–3	2–1	2–2	—	5–0
Sporting Natalievca	1–5	2–1	0–2	1–3	3–6	4–6	1–2	4–1	6–1	—

Source: FMF (in Romanian)
Legend: Blue = home team win; Yellow = draw; Red = away team win.

== Centre ==
Pos	Team	Pld	W	D	L	GF	GA	GD	Pts	Promotion or relegation
1	Sucleia (C, P)	18	16	2	0	55	12	+43	50	Promotion to Divizia A
2	FCM Ungheni	18	14	2	2	78	18	+60	44	
3	Bogzești	18	10	4	4	40	27	+13	34	
4	Fulger Ialoveni	18	9	1	8	49	31	+18	28	withdrew (Note: Fulger Ialoveni completed the season but withdrew from the league prior to the start of the next season.)
5	Cricova	18	7	5	6	31	32	−1	26	
6	Fortuna Pleșeni	18	7	2	9	42	40	+2	23	withdrew (Note: Fortuna Pleșeni completed the season but withdrew from the league prior to the start of the next season.)
7	ARF Ialoveni	18	6	3	9	29	40	−11	21	
8	Sinteza Căușeni	18	5	1	12	33	50	−17	16	
9	Codru-Juniori	18	4	0	14	31	81	−50	12	
10	Tighina-2 (R)	18	1	2	15	15	72	−57	5	Relegation to regional level

Source: FMF, Soccerway
Rules for classification: 1) Points; 2) Head-to-head points; 3) Head-to-head goal difference; 4) Head-to-head away goals scored; 5) Head-to-head goals scored; 6) Matches won; 7) Goal difference; 8) Goals scored; 9) Less red cards; 10) Less yellow cards.
(C) Champions; (P) Promoted; (R) Relegated

=== Results ===
The schedule consists of two rounds, each team plays each other once home-and-away for a total of 18 matches per team.

Home \ Away	BOG	COD	CRI	FOR	FUL	ARF	SIN	SUC	TIG	UNG
Bogzești	—	7–0	1–1	3–0	2–1	3–2	1–0	0–3	3–2	1–1
Codru-Juniori	2–3	—	1–0	5–2	1–3	1–2	0–7	1–5	3–1	2–8
Cricova	0–4	6–0	—	4–2	0–4	2–1	0–4	3–4	6–2	0–4
Fortuna Pleșeni	1–3	9–1	2–2	—	2–3	2–0	2–1	0–3	10–0	0–1
Fulger Ialoveni	1–1	8–1	0–2	2–3	—	0–2	4–0	0–2	9–0	2–8
ARF Ialoveni	0–0	4–2	1–2	2–2	2–6	—	2–1	0–4	6–0	0–3
Sinteza Căușeni	1–3	4–2	1–1	1–3	0–2	3–4	—	2–8	2–0	1–4
Sucleia	1–0	2–1	0–0	5–1	2–1	2–0	4–1	—	3–0	1–1
Tighina-2	2–1	2–7	1–1	0–1	2–3	1–1	2–4	0–1	—	0–3
FCM Ungheni	9–4	8–1	0–1	4–0	1–0	6–0	8–0	1–5	8–0	—

Source: FMF (in Romanian)
Legend: Blue = home team win; Yellow = draw; Red = away team win.

== South ==
Pos	Team	Pld	W	D	L	GF	GA	GD	Pts	Promotion or relegation
1	Olimp Comrat (C, P)	14	10	3	1	33	8	+25	33	Promotion to Divizia A
2	Sporting Trestieni	14	9	3	2	40	10	+30	30	
3	Maiak Chirsova	14	8	3	3	28	13	+15	27	
4	Congaz	14	7	2	5	17	15	+2	23	
5	Saksan	14	5	2	7	27	25	+2	17	
6	Slobozia Mare	14	5	0	9	16	37	−21	15	
7	Văsieni	14	4	2	8	18	33	−15	14	
8	Flacăra Mingir	14	0	1	13	10	48	−38	1	withdrew (Note: Flacăra Mingir withdrew from the league after round 7. All remaining fixtures are awarded 0–3 against them.)

Source: FMF, Soccerway
Rules for classification: 1) Points; 2) Head-to-head points; 3) Head-to-head goal difference; 4) Head-to-head away goals scored; 5) Head-to-head goals scored; 6) Matches won; 7) Goal difference; 8) Goals scored; 9) Less red cards; 10) Less yellow cards.
(C) Champions; (P) Promoted

=== Results ===
The schedule consists of two rounds, each team plays each other once home-and-away for a total of 14 matches per team.

Home \ Away	CON	FLA	MAI	OLI	SAK	SLO	SPO	VĂS
Congaz	—	3–0	2–1	0–0	1–1	1–2	0–1	2–1
Flacăra Mingir	1–2	—	0–3	1–4	0–3	0–3	0–3	2–2
Maiak Chirsova	3–1	3–0	—	1–1	2–1	3–0	1–1	1–2
Olimp Comrat	2–1	3–0	2–1	—	1–0	5–0	2–1	5–0
Saksan	0–1	5–3	2–3	0–2	—	7–0	2–2	4–0
Slobozia Mare	0–1	5–2	0–2	0–4	0–1	—	2–0	2–0
Sporting Trestieni	3–0	6–1	0–0	2–1	6–0	8–0	—	2–0
Văsieni	0–2	3–0	1–4	1–1	4–1	3–2	1–5	—

Source: FMF (in Romanian)
Legend: Blue = home team win; Yellow = draw; Red = away team win.
