= 2005–06 Moldovan "B" Division =

Moldovan "B" Division
- Season: 2005–06

The 2005–06 Moldovan "B" Division (Romanian: Divizia B) was the 15th season of Moldovan football's third-tier league. There are 24 teams in the competition, in two groups, 12 in the North and 12 in the South.

== "B" Division North ==
=== Final standings ===
Pos	Team	Pld	W	D	L	GF	GA	GD	Pts
1	Izvoraș-67 Ratuș	20	13	3	4	44	17	+27	42
2	Viişoara Mileştii Mici	20	12	4	4	39	15	+24	40
3	Petrocub Sărata Galbenă	20	11	5	4	64	20	+44	38
4	FC Viitorul Step-Soci	20	11	4	5	34	18	+16	37
5	Scânteia Stauceni	20	10	5	5	49	30	+19	35
6	Locomotiva Bălți	20	9	5	6	35	39	−4	32
7	FC Florești	20	8	5	7	38	26	+12	29
8	CSF Cricova	20	6	1	13	31	45	−14	19
9	Flacăra Faleşti	20	3	6	11	23	38	−15	15
10	FC Orhei	20	4	1	15	32	81	−49	13
11	FC Sîngera	20	3	1	16	20	80	−60	10
–	Vilia Briceni (W)	0	0	0	0	0	0	0	0

(W) Withdrew

== "B" Division South ==
=== Final standings ===
Pos	Team	Pld	W	D	L	GF	GA	GD	Pts
1	Dinamo-2 Bender	20	17	1	2	83	15	+68	52
2	Fortuna Pleșeni	20	17	1	2	79	12	+67	52
3	FC Cahul	20	16	1	3	77	13	+64	49
4	Victoria Bardar	20	10	3	7	40	34	+6	33
5	Kolos Copceac	20	8	5	7	43	40	+3	29
6	Sinteza Căușeni	20	6	5	9	24	41	−17	23
7	FC Slobozia Mare	20	5	4	11	30	54	−24	19
8	Taraclia-Gaz Taraclia	20	4	6	10	29	45	−16	18
9	Rodina Comrat	20	3	4	13	16	72	−56	13
10	USC Gagauziya-2 Congaz	20	3	4	13	20	50	−30	13
11	FC Corten	20	4	0	16	20	85	−65	12
–	Maiak Chirsova (W)	0	0	0	0	0	0	0	0

(W) Withdrew
