= 2018 Moldovan "B" Division =

Divizia B
- Season: 2018

The 2018 Moldovan "B" Division (Romanian: Divizia B) was the 28th season of Moldovan football's third-tier league. The season started on 5 May 2018 and ended on 10 November 2018. The league consisted of three regional groups, Nord (North), Centru (Centre) and Sud (South).

== North ==
| Pos | Team | Pld | W | D | L | GF | GA | GD | Pts | Promotion or relegation |
|---|---|---|---|---|---|---|---|---|---|---|
| 1 | Speranța Drochia (C, P) | 16 | 15 | 0 | 1 | 48 | 9 | +39 | 45 | Promotion to Divizia A |
| 2 | Soroca | 16 | 12 | 1 | 3 | 48 | 28 | +20 | 37 | |
| 3 | Edineț | 16 | 11 | 1 | 4 | 47 | 17 | +30 | 34 | |
| 4 | Rîșcani | 16 | 7 | 1 | 8 | 35 | 34 | +1 | 22 | |
| 5 | Rezina | 16 | 7 | 0 | 9 | 34 | 49 | −15 | 21 | |
| 6 | Intersport Sănătăuca | 16 | 5 | 1 | 10 | 20 | 30 | −10 | 16 | |
| 7 | Cruiz Camenca | 16 | 4 | 3 | 9 | 17 | 36 | −19 | 15 | |
| 8 | Sporting Natalievca | 16 | 3 | 4 | 9 | 16 | 31 | −15 | 13 | |
| 9 | Maiac Cioropcani | 16 | 2 | 1 | 13 | 9 | 40 | −31 | 7 | withdrew (Note: Maiac Cioropcani withdrew from the league after round 9. All remaining fixtures are awarded 0–3 against them.) |

Source: FMF, Soccerway
Rules for classification: 1) Points; 2) Head-to-head points; 3) Head-to-head goal difference; 4) Head-to-head away goals scored; 5) Head-to-head goals scored; 6) Matches won; 7) Goal difference; 8) Goals scored; 9) Less red cards; 10) Less yellow cards.
(C) Champions; (P) Promoted

=== Results ===
The schedule consists of two rounds, each team plays each other once home-and-away for a total of 16 matches per team.

| Home \ Away | CRU | EDI | INT | MAI | REZ | RÎȘ | SOR | SPE | SPO |
|---|---|---|---|---|---|---|---|---|---|
| Cruiz Camenca | — | 0–3 | 0–0 | 3–0 | 1–6 | 0–2 | 2–1 | 0–2 | 2–2 |
| Edineț | 4–0 | — | 2–1 | 3–0 | 9–0 | 4–3 | 6–1 | 1–3 | 2–0 |
| Intersport Sănătăuca | 5–1 | 1–0 | — | 1–2 | 1–2 | 0–3 | 1–3 | 0–4 | 2–0 |
| Maiac Cioropcani | 2–1 | 0–1 | 0–3 | — | 0–3 | 0–3 | 1–4 | 0–3 | 0–3 |
| Rezina | 2–3 | 1–7 | 3–1 | 2–1 | — | 5–0 | 4–7 | 0–3 | 4–2 |
| Rîșcani | 1–2 | 1–3 | 5–1 | 2–2 | 4–0 | — | 1–4 | 1–4 | 4–1 |
| Soroca | 2–1 | 2–0 | 3–1 | 3–0 | 3–2 | 5–3 | — | 1–4 | 5–0 |
| Speranța Drochia | 3–0 | 3–1 | 2–1 | 3–0 | 4–0 | 3–1 | 1–3 | — | 4–0 |
| Sporting Natalievca | 1–1 | 1–1 | 0–1 | 2–1 | 3–0 | 0–1 | 1–1 | 0–2 | — |

Source: FMF (in Romanian)
Legend: Blue = home team win; Yellow = draw; Red = away team win.

== Centre ==
| Pos | Team | Pld | W | D | L | GF | GA | GD | Pts | Promotion or relegation |
|---|---|---|---|---|---|---|---|---|---|---|
| 1 | Tighina (C, P) | 18 | 14 | 3 | 1 | 80 | 11 | +69 | 45 | Promotion to Divizia A |
| 2 | Dacia Buiucani (Note: The club did not earn the promotion on the sports principle. However, they received the A license and were enrolled for the 2019 season.) (P) | 18 | 11 | 3 | 4 | 59 | 15 | +44 | 36 | Promotion to Divizia A |
| 3 | FCM Ungheni | 18 | 10 | 5 | 3 | 78 | 28 | +50 | 35 (Note: FCM Ungheni ahead of Sucleia on head-to-head points: FCM Ungheni–Sucleia 1–0, Sucleia–FCM Ungheni 1–1) | |
| 4 | Sucleia | 18 | 10 | 5 | 3 | 55 | 23 | +32 | 35 | |
| 5 | Bogzești | 18 | 10 | 2 | 6 | 43 | 25 | +18 | 32 | |
| 6 | Sinteza Căușeni | 18 | 6 | 4 | 8 | 29 | 45 | −16 | 22 | |
| 7 | Codru-Juniori | 18 | 5 | 3 | 10 | 41 | 58 | −17 | 18 | |
| 8 | Cricova | 18 | 4 | 2 | 12 | 24 | 65 | −41 | 14 | |
| 9 | Fulger Ialoveni | 18 | 4 | 1 | 13 | 24 | 69 | −45 | 13 | |
| 10 | ISM-2017 (R) | 18 | 1 | 2 | 15 | 29 | 123 | −94 | 5 | Relegation to regional level |

Source: FMF, Soccerway
Rules for classification: 1) Points; 2) Head-to-head points; 3) Head-to-head goal difference; 4) Head-to-head away goals scored; 5) Head-to-head goals scored; 6) Matches won; 7) Goal difference; 8) Goals scored; 9) Less red cards; 10) Less yellow cards.
(C) Champions; (P) Promoted; (R) Relegated

=== Results ===
The schedule consists of two rounds, each team plays each other once home-and-away for a total of 18 matches per team.

| Home \ Away | BOG | COD | CRI | DAC | FUL | ISM | SIN | SUC | TIG | UNG |
|---|---|---|---|---|---|---|---|---|---|---|
| Bogzești | — | 4–1 | 2–0 | 1–2 | 2–1 | 5–0 | 3–0 | 1–1 | 2–3 | 1–0 |
| Codru-Juniori | 1–1 | — | 4–1 | 1–3 | 0–3 | 9–3 | 2–1 | 2–5 | 0–4 | 3–3 |
| Cricova | 2–1 | 6–4 | — | 0–2 | 3–2 | 3–0 | 0–0 | 0–3 | 0–4 | 3–3 |
| Dacia Buiucani | 2–0 | 3–0 | 11–0 | — | 6–1 | 13–0 | 5–0 | 0–2 | 0–1 | 2–3 |
| Fulger Ialoveni | 0–1 | 1–5 | 3–0 | 0–4 | — | 2–1 | 0–3 | 0–3 | 1–3 | 5–3 |
| ISM-2017 | 4–11 | 3–4 | 3–2 | 2–3 | 2–2 | — | 1–3 | 7–11 | 0–11 | 0–11 |
| Sinteza Căușeni | 1–3 | 5–3 | 4–0 | 1–1 | 4–2 | 2–2 | — | 1–0 | 1–3 | 1–1 |
| Sucleia | 0–2 | 2–2 | 4–1 | 2–2 | 5–0 | 9–1 | 5–1 | — | 0–0 | 1–1 |
| Tighina | 5–2 | 4–0 | 11–1 | 0–0 | 7–0 | 9–0 | 7–0 | 1–2 | — | 7–2 |
| FCM Ungheni | 2–1 | 6–0 | 4–2 | 1–0 | 17–1 | 13–0 | 7–1 | 1–0 | 0–0 | — |

Source: FMF (in Romanian)
Legend: Blue = home team win; Yellow = draw; Red = away team win.

== South ==
| Pos | Team | Pld | W | D | L | GF | GA | GD | Pts | Promotion or relegation |
|---|---|---|---|---|---|---|---|---|---|---|
| 1 | Spartanii Selemet (C, P) | 12 | 10 | 0 | 2 | 36 | 16 | +20 | 30 | Promotion to Divizia A |
| 2 | Fortuna Pleșeni | 12 | 8 | 3 | 1 | 31 | 13 | +18 | 27 | |
| 3 | Olimp Comrat | 12 | 7 | 1 | 4 | 28 | 23 | +5 | 22 | |
| 4 | Maiak Chirsova | 12 | 5 | 1 | 6 | 14 | 19 | −5 | 16 (Note: Maiak ahead of Congaz on head-to-head goal difference: Congaz–Maiak 1–0, Maiak–Congaz 4–1) | |
| 5 | Congaz | 12 | 5 | 1 | 6 | 15 | 17 | −2 | 16 | |
| 6 | Flacăra Mingir | 12 | 2 | 2 | 8 | 11 | 21 | −10 | 8 | |
| 7 | Slobozia Mare | 12 | 1 | 0 | 11 | 6 | 32 | −26 | 3 | |

Source: FMF, Soccerway
Rules for classification: 1) Points; 2) Head-to-head points; 3) Head-to-head goal difference; 4) Head-to-head away goals scored; 5) Head-to-head goals scored; 6) Matches won; 7) Goal difference; 8) Goals scored; 9) Less red cards; 10) Less yellow cards.
1. Trachia Taraclia withdrew from the league after round 6 and their results were annulled.
(C) Champions; (P) Promoted

=== Results ===
The schedule consists of two rounds, each team plays each other once home-and-away for a total of 12 matches per team.

| Home \ Away | CON | FLA | FOR | MAI | OLI | SLO | SPA |
|---|---|---|---|---|---|---|---|
| Congaz | — | 2–1 | 0–1 | 1–0 | 0–2 | 6–0 | 0–2 |
| Flacăra Mingir | 0–0 | — | 0–3 | 1–3 | 1–2 | 3–0 | 0–1 |
| Fortuna Pleșeni | 3–2 | 1–1 | — | 2–0 | 4–4 | 4–0 | 3–0 |
| Maiak Chirsova | 4–1 | 0–3 | 0–0 | — | 3–1 | 2–1 | 1–2 |
| Olimp Comrat | 0–1 | 4–0 | 0–5 | 3–0 | — | 3–1 | 7–2 |
| Slobozia Mare | 0–1 | 2–1 | 1–2 | 0–1 | 0–2 | — | 0–3 |
| Spartanii Selemet | 4–1 | 3–0 | 5–3 | 4–0 | 6–0 | 4–1 | — |

Source: FMF (in Romanian)
Legend: Blue = home team win; Yellow = draw; Red = away team win.
