= 2003–04 Moldovan "B" Division =

Moldovan "B" Division
- Season: 2003–04

The 2003–04 Moldovan "B" Division (Romanian: Divizia B) was the 13th season of Moldovan football's third-tier league. There are 27 teams in the competition, in two groups, 14 in the North and 13 in the South.

== "B" Division North ==
=== Final standings ===
Tables at winter break:

Pos	Team	Pld	W	D	L	GF	GA	GD	Pts
1	Viişoara Mileştii Mici	13	11	0	2	32	15	+17	33
2	Spartac Ungheni	13	9	1	3	50	18	+32	28
3	Steaua-2 Chișinău	13	8	3	2	24	15	+9	27
4	Goliador-Agro-2 Chișinău	13	8	2	3	28	20	+8	26
5	Sculeni-Prut	13	8	1	4	41	20	+21	25
6	Flacăra Faleşti	13	7	3	3	26	12	+14	24
7	Intersport-Aroma Cobusca Nouă	13	6	2	5	24	19	+5	20
8	Nistru	13	5	2	6	14	24	−10	17
9	Locomotiva Bălți	13	4	1	8	15	34	−19	13
10	Liceul Sportiv Chișinău	13	3	4	6	25	24	+1	13
11	FC Soroca	13	3	2	8	20	28	−8	11
12	Avenarex Ratuș	13	3	0	10	14	36	−22	9
13	FC Florești	13	2	1	10	8	23	−15	7
14	Victoraș Suruceni	13	2	2	9	12	45	−33	6 (Note: Victoraș Suruceni was deducted a total of 2 points.)

Updated to match(es) played on unknown. Source:
Notes:

Winner: Viişoara Mileştii Mici

== "B" Division South ==
=== Final standings ===
Table at winter break:

Pos	Team	Pld	W	D	L	GF	GA	GD	Pts
1	Fortuna Pleșeni	12	9	2	1	34	12	+22	29
2	USC Gagauziya-2 Congaz	12	7	2	3	28	9	+19	23
3	FC Slobozia Mare	12	6	5	1	26	11	+15	23
4	Kolos Copceac	12	6	5	1	23	11	+12	23
5	Olimp Tomai	12	7	2	3	22	17	+5	23
6	Victoria Bardar	12	6	1	5	22	19	+3	19
7	Sinteza Căușeni	12	5	3	4	21	23	−2	18
8	Atletic	12	5	2	5	19	21	−2	17
9	FC Cahul	12	3	5	4	19	17	+2	14
10	Petrocub Sărata-Galbenă	12	3	3	6	16	21	−5	12
11	KDU Magnat	12	2	2	8	5	17	−12	8
12	Alifomix Cania	12	1	3	8	8	26	−18	6
13	FC Corten	12	0	1	11	9	48	−39	1

Winner: Olimp Tomai
