= 2007–08 Moldovan "B" Division =

Moldovan "B" Division
- Season: 2007–08

The 2007–08 Moldovan "B" Division (Romanian: Divizia B) was the 17th season of Moldovan football's third-tier league. There are 18 teams in the competition, in two groups, 9 in the North and 9 in the South.

== "B" Division North ==
=== Final standings ===
Pos	Team	Pld	W	D	L	GF	GA	GD	Pts
1	Podiş Ineşti	12	10	2	0	31	8	+23	32
2	CSF Cricova	12	5	3	4	17	16	+1	18
3	FC Florești	12	4	4	4	19	14	+5	16
4	Flacăra Faleşti	12	4	2	6	10	14	−4	14
5	FC Glodeni	12	3	5	4	20	24	−4	14
6	FC Telenești	12	4	0	8	13	23	−10	12
7	Volna Soroca	12	2	4	6	7	18	−11	10
–	FC Speranţa Hristoforovca (X)	0	0	0	0	0	0	0	0
–	FC Sculeni (W)	0	0	0	0	0	0	0	0

(W) Withdrew; (X) Excluded after 2 no shows

== "B" Division South ==
=== Final standings ===
Pos	Team	Pld	W	D	L	GF	GA	GD	Pts
1	Viişoara Mileștii Mici	16	14	2	0	57	5	+52	44
2	FC Cantemir	16	10	0	6	37	26	+11	30
3	Victoria Bardar	16	8	2	6	39	29	+10	26
4	Sinteza Căușeni	16	8	1	7	29	23	+6	25
5	Kolos Copceac	16	7	2	7	27	28	−1	23
6	FC Congaz	16	5	6	5	29	32	−3	21
7	FC Cahul-2005-2	16	5	2	9	18	31	−13	17
8	Maiak Chirsova	16	5	0	11	22	50	−28	15
9	Locomotiva Bălți-2	16	2	1	13	15	49	−34	7
