= 2009–10 Moldovan "B" Division =

Moldovan "B" Division
- Season: 2009–10
- Champions: Dinamo-Auto Tiraspol
- Promoted: Dinamo-Auto Tiraspol
- Goals scored: 1,180
- Average goals/game: 3.49

The 2009–10 Moldovan "B" Division (Romanian: Divizia B) was the 19th season of Liga 2, the third tier of the Moldovan football league system. 27 teams participated in two geographic divisions; 13 teams played in Division North and 14 played in Division South. Dinamo-Auto Tiraspol won the title and promotion to Liga 1 in the club's first season.

== "B" Division North ==
=== Final standings ===
Pos	Team	Pld	W	D	L	GF	GA	GD	Pts
1	Dinamo-Auto Tiraspol	24	17	5	2	69	11	+58	56
2	CSF Cricova	24	15	6	3	51	21	+30	51
3	FC Glodeni	24	16	3	5	55	25	+30	51
4	CS Drochia	24	15	3	6	45	24	+21	48
5	Dava Soroca	24	13	7	4	58	32	+26	46
6	CS Anina	24	10	7	7	28	30	−2	37
7	FC Floreşti	24	10	4	10	39	35	+4	34
8	FC Flacăra	24	8	6	10	33	30	+3	30
9	CF Rîşcani	24	8	3	13	34	45	−11	27
10	FC Teleneşti	24	8	2	14	29	49	−20	26
11	CS Cojusna	24	4	2	18	33	76	−43	14
12	FC Boldureşti	24	4	1	19	30	84	−54	13
13	CS Tiras	24	2	3	19	20	62	−42	9

== "B" Division South ==
=== Final standings ===
Pos	Team	Pld	W	D	L	GF	GA	GD	Pts
1	FC Viişoara	26	20	5	1	96	20	+76	65
2	FC Victoria	26	19	3	4	75	13	+62	60
3	FC Speranţa	26	19	3	4	62	29	+33	60
4	Universitatea Agrară	26	14	4	8	51	27	+24	46
5	Maiak Chirsova	26	13	3	10	54	39	+15	42
6	FC Slobozia Mare	26	13	3	10	50	42	+8	42
7	Congaz	26	10	6	10	33	42	−9	36
8	FC Kolos	26	10	3	13	40	48	−8	33
9	Fortuna	26	9	6	11	31	45	−14	33
10	FC Vulcaneşti	26	9	2	15	44	80	−36	29
11	Găgăuzia-2	26	7	5	14	43	64	−21	26
12	FC Cantemir	26	5	4	17	34	65	−31	19
13	FC Trachia	26	4	3	19	21	67	−46	15
14	Sinteza	26	3	4	19	23	76	−53	13
