= 2016–17 Moldovan "A" Division =

Divizia A
- Season: 2016–17
- Champions: Sheriff-2 Tiraspol
- Promoted: Sfîntul Gheorghe; Spicul Chișcăreni
- Relegated: Prut Leova
- Matches: 210
- Goals: 777 (3.7 per match)
- Top goalscorer: Artiom Zabun (21 goals)

The 2016–17 Moldovan "A" Division (Romanian: Divizia A) was the 26th season of Moldovan football's second-tier league. Fifteen teams competed in this division, including reserve sides from top-flight Divizia Națională teams. The season began on 5 August 2016 and ended on 31 May 2017.

Spicul Chișcăreni were the defending champions, after winning their first title in the competition in the previous season.

== Teams ==
Location of teams in Moldovan "A" Division 2016–17

Club	Location
Sfîntul Gheorghe	Suruceni
Spicul	Chișcăreni
Dacia-2 Buiucani	Chișinău
Victoria	Chișinău
Sheriff-2	Tiraspol
Intersport-Aroma	Cobusca Nouă
Zimbru-2	Chișinău
Edineț	Edineț
Sîngerei	Sîngerei
Gagauziya-Oguzsport	Comrat
Iskra	Rîbnița
Sparta	Selemet
Codru	Lozova
Real Succes	Chișinău
Prut	Leova

== Season summary ==
=== League table ===
Pos	Team	Pld	W	D	L	GF	GA	GD	Pts	Promotion or relegation
1	Sheriff-2 Tiraspol (C)	28	22	2	4	94	19	+75	68	Ineligible for promotion
2	Sfîntul Gheorghe (P)	28	21	3	4	79	23	+56	66 (Note: Sf. Gheorghe ahead of Spicul on head-to-head points: Spicul–Sf. Gheorghe 0–1, Sf. Gheorghe–Spicul 3–0)	Promotion to Divizia Națională
3	Spicul Chișcăreni (P)	28	21	3	4	62	22	+40	66	Promotion to Divizia Națională
4	Victoria Chișinău	28	20	4	4	78	26	+52	64	
5	Zimbru-2 Chișinău	28	13	5	10	57	38	+19	44	Ineligible for promotion
6	Sparta Selemet	28	13	2	13	51	61	−10	41	
7	Sîngerei	28	13	1	14	48	53	−5	40	
8	Edineț	28	11	3	14	55	57	−2	36	
9	Iskra Rîbnița	28	10	5	13	39	50	−11	35	
10	Dacia-2 Buiucani	28	10	4	14	39	45	−6	34	withdrew (Note: Dacia-2 Buiucani completed the season but withdrew from the league prior to the start of the next season.)
11	Real Succes Chișinău	28	9	2	17	37	54	−17	29 (Note: Real Succes ahead of Gagauziya-Oguzsport on head-to-head goal difference: Gagauziya-Oguzsport–Real Succes 4–0, Real Succes–Gagauziya-Oguzsport 6–0)	
12	Gagauziya-Oguzsport	28	9	2	17	51	74	−23	29	withdrew (Note: Gagauziya-Oguzsport completed the season but withdrew from the league prior to the start of the next season.)
13	Codru Lozova	28	8	3	17	48	81	−33	27	
14	Intersport-Aroma	28	6	4	18	20	50	−30	22	withdrew (Note: As per regulations, the fourteenth placed team, Intersport-Aroma was to be relegated to Divizia B, but the club withdrew before the start of the next season.)
15	Prut Leova (R)	28	2	1	25	19	124	−105	7	Relegation to Divizia B

Source: Soccerway
Rules for classification: 1) Points; 2) Head-to-head points; 3) Head-to-head goal difference; 4) Head-to-head away goals scored; 5) Head-to-head goals scored; 6) Matches won; 7) Goal difference; 8) Goals scored; 9) Fairplay ranking.
(C) Champions; (P) Promoted; (R) Relegated

=== Results ===
Home \ Away	SFÎ	VIC	ZIM	SHE	DAC	EDI	GAG	INT	REA	PRU	SÎN	COD	SPA	SPI	ISK
Sfîntul Gheorghe		1–0	2–0	0–0	2–1	4–0	1–4	4–1	3–0	8–0	4–0	2–3	3–1	3–0	4–0
Victoria Chișinău	2–2		1–1	2–0	1–1	2–1	4–0	6–1	2–3	7–1	5–0	5–2	4–1	3–2	4–1
Zimbru-2 Chișinău	2–2	0–2		0–3	0–0	3–2	4–1	2–0	3–0	6–0	0–0	4–0	4–3	1–4	4–0
Sheriff-2 Tiraspol	1–0	3–2	2–1		4–0	5–0	9–1	1–0	0–1	3–1	4–0	9–0	15–0	2–0	4–1
Dacia-2 Buiucani	0–6	1–5	1–2	1–2		4–2	2–1	3–0	0–0	9–1	4–3	2–0	0–1	0–2	1–1
Edineț	1–2	1–1	2–1	1–4	4–1		6–0	2–0	3–0	5–1	1–3	3–0	1–2	1–4	1–1
Gagauziya-Oguzsport	0–7	1–2	2–4	3–6	0–2	1–1		3–0	4–0	5–0	0–1	2–0	1–3	1–2	1–0
Intersport-Aroma	0–1	0–1	0–3	0–0	1–0	1–2	1–3		1–0	3–1	1–0	1–1	2–1	0–2	0–0
Real Succes Chișinău	0–3	0–4	1–0	0–3	1–3	2–3	6–0	1–3		3–1	3–0	2–3	2–3	0–1	1–3
Prut Leova	1–5	0–5	0–2	0–1	1–0	1–5	0–8	2–0	1–2		1–7	2–3	0–3	1–2	0–0
Sîngerei	1–2	0–2	2–1	1–2	2–0	2–0	3–2	2–0	2–1	6–1		5–2	1–4	0–3	3–1
Codru Lozova	3–5	0–1	2–6	0–6	1–2	4–1	2–2	1–0	3–6	8–1	3–1		3–2	1–4	2–3
Sparta Selemet	0–1	0–2	2–0	0–3	0–1	2–4	4–1	5–2	1–1	4–0	0–1	2–0		1–5	2–1
Spicul Chișcăreni	0–1	1–0	0–0	2–1	1–0	2–0	4–0	2–1	1–0	9–1	2–1	0–0	3–3		3–0
Iskra Rîbnița	2–1	2–3	4–3	2–1	1–0	4–2	0–4	1–1	0–1	5–0	4–1	2–1	0–1	0–1	

Source: Soccerway
Legend: Blue = home team win; Yellow = draw; Red = away team win.

== Top goalscorers ==
Rank	Player	Club	Goals
1	(Moldova) Artiom Zabun	Victoria	21
2	(Moldova) Oleg Molla	Spicul	18
3	(Moldova) Sergiu Popovici	Edineț	17
4	(Moldova) Alexandru Maxim	Sfîntul Gheorghe	16
4	(Moldova) Marin Căruntu	Sheriff-2	16
6	(Moldova) Roman Șumchin	Gagauziya-Oguzsport	15
7	(Moldova) Veaceslav Sofroni	Spicul	14
7	(Moldova) Vitalie Greciuhin	Edineț	14
9	(Moldova) Artiom Puntus	Sheriff-2	13
10	(Moldova) Nicolae Nemerenco	Sfîntul Gheorghe (4) & Codru (8)	12
10	(Moldova) Alexandru Bezimov	Victoria	12
10	(Moldova) Andrian Apostol	Dacia-2 Buiucani	12
10	(Moldova) Ghenadie Orbu	Victoria	12
