= 2013–14 Moldovan "A" Division =

Moldovan "A" Division
- Season: 2013–14
- Champions: Saxan
- Promoted: Saxan
- Relegated: Rîşcani; Slobozia Mare
- Goals: 486
- Top goalscorer: Alexandru Răilean (20 goals)
- Biggest home win: Sheriff-2 8–0 Olimpia-2 Locomotiva
- Biggest away win: Rîşcani 0–6 Saxan
- Highest scoring: Zimbru-2 8–2 Gagauziya; Sfîntul Gheorghe 8–2 Slobozia Mare

The 2013–14 Moldovan "A" Division season is the 23rd since its establishment. A total of 14 teams are contesting the league.

== Teams ==
Club	Location
Dacia-2 Buiucani	Chişinău
FC Victoria	Bardar
Nistru Otaci	Otaci
Gagauziya	Comrat
Zimbru-2	Chişinău
Sheriff-2	Tiraspol
Saxan	Ceadîr-Lunga
Intersport-Aroma	Cobusca Nouă
Sfîntul Gheorghe	Suruceni
Real Succes	Chişinău
Olimpia-2 Locomotiva	Bălţi
Edineţ	Edineţ
Rîşcani	Rîşcani
Slobozia Mare	Slobozia Mare

== League table ==
Pos	Team	Pld	W	D	L	GF	GA	GD	Pts	Promotion or relegation
1	Saxan Ceadîr-Lunga (C, P)	24	18	4	2	66	12	+54	58	Promotion to Divizia Națională
2	Dacia-2 Buiucani	24	18	3	3	53	20	+33	57	Ineligible for promotion
3	Victoria Bardar	24	13	5	6	44	30	+14	44	
4	Sheriff-2 Tiraspol	24	12	6	6	44	19	+25	42	Ineligible for promotion
5	Sfîntul Gheorghe	24	12	3	9	40	28	+12	39	
6	Zimbru-2 Chișinău	24	10	7	7	41	26	+15	37	Ineligible for promotion
7	Intersport-Aroma	24	8	6	10	35	40	−5	30	
8	Edineț	24	9	3	12	35	37	−2	30	
9	Real Succes Chișinău	24	7	6	11	31	45	−14	27	
10	Gagauziya Comrat	24	7	5	12	31	53	−22	26	
11	Olimpia-2 Locomotiva	24	4	8	12	25	53	−28	20	withdrew (Note: Olimpia-2 Locomotiva completed the season but withdrew from the league prior to the start of the next season.)
12	Rîșcani (R)	24	4	6	14	27	58	−31	18	Relegation to Divizia B
13	Slobozia Mare (R)	24	1	4	19	14	65	−51	7	Relegation to Divizia B
–	Nistru Otaci (D)	0	0	0	0	0	0	0	0	Disqualified

Source: Football Association of Moldova (in Romanian)
Rules for classification: 1st points; 2nd head-to-head points; 3rd head-to-head goal difference; 4th head-to-head goals scored; 5th goal difference; 6th number of goals scored; 7th Fair Play competition
(C) Champions; (D) Disqualified; (P) Promoted; (R) Relegated

=== Round by round ===
Team ╲ Round	1	2	3	4	5	6	7	8	9	10	11	12	13	14	15	16	17	18	19	20	21	22	23	24	25	26
Saxan Ceadîr-Lunga	1	2	1	1	1	1	1	1	1	1	1	1	1	1	1	1	1	2	2	2	1	1	1	1	1	1
Dacia-2 Buiucani	2	1	2	2	2	2	2	2	2	2	2	2	2	2	2	2	2	1	1	1	2	2	2	2	2	2
Victoria Bardar	6	8	9	11	12	6	6	6	5	5	5	5	4	4	3	5	5	4	3	3	3	3	3	3	3	3
Sheriff-2 Tiraspol	4	3	5	4	3	4	4	5	3	3	3	3	3	3	4	3	3	3	4	4	4	4	4	4	4	4
Sfîntul Gheorghe	11	12	12	6	8	10	10	12	9	9	9	9	6	6	6	6	7	7	6	6	5	5	5	5	5	5
Zimbru-2 Chișinău	13	7	4	5	5	5	5	4	6	6	6	6	7	7	7	7	6	6	7	8	7	7	6	6	6	6
Intersport-Aroma	10	5	3	3	4	3	3	3	4	4	4	4	5	5	5	4	4	5	5	5	6	6	7	7	7	7
Edineț	9	13	13	13	13	11	11	7	7	7	7	7	9	9	9	8	8	8	8	7	8	8	8	9	8	8
Real Succes Chișinău	3	4	6	8	6	7	7	10	8	8	8	8	8	8	10	11	10	10	9	10	10	10	9	10	9	9
Gagauziya Comrat	8	9	11	7	10	9	9	11	11	11	11	11	11	11	11	10	9	9	10	9	9	9	10	8	10	10
Olimpia-2 Locomotiva	12	6	10	12	11	8	8	8	10	10	10	10	10	10	8	9	11	11	11	11	11	11	11	11	11	11
Rîșcani	5	10	7	10	7	12	12	9	12	12	12	12	12	12	12	12	12	12	12	12	12	12	12	12	12	12
Slobozia Mare	7	11	8	9	9	13	13	13	13	13	13	13	13	13	13	13	13	13	13	13	13	13	13	13	13	13

Source: Football Association of Moldova (in Romanian)

== Results ==
Home \ Away	DAC	RÎȘ	GAG	INT	REA	LOC	SLO	EDI	SAX	VIC	SHE	SFÎ	ZIM
Dacia-2 Buiucani		3–0	1–1	5–1	1–0	5–1	2–0	2–1	1–2	3–2	0–0	1–2	2–0
Rîșcani	1–2		1–2	1–5	3–4	0–0	5–0	2–2	0–6	2–2	1–0	2–1	0–0
Gagauziya Comrat	1–3	3–1		3–4	2–2	3–2	3–1	0–3	2–1	1–1	0–0	2–0	1–5
Intersport-Aroma	0–1	1–1	1–0		1–1	4–1	3–3	0–0	1–0	1–2	1–2	1–3	0–3
Real Succes Chișinău	2–3	4–1	2–0	2–1		1–1	2–1	1–2	2–3	1–2	2–1	2–1	0–2
Olimpia - 2 Locomotiva	1–3	2–2	1–3	0–3	0–0		3–0	1–0	0–2	2–2	1–1	0–1	2–2
Slobozia Mare	0–3	2–3	0–0	0–1	1–1	0–1		1–0	0–5	0–3	0–5	2–3	0–0
Edineț	1–3	3–0	2–1	1–2	2–0	4–1	4–0		0–0	1–2	1–2	3–1	2–1
Saxan Ceadîr-Lunga	1–1	5–0	4–0	3–0	7–0	3–0	3–1	3–0		2–0	2–0	1–1	5–0
Victoria Bardar	0–2	2–0	3–0	4–2	1–1	5–1	1–0	3–1	1–4		3–1	0–2	0–1
Sheriff-2 Tiraspol	2–3	2–0	3–1	2–0	3–0	8–0	3–0	5–0	2–2	0–2		1–0	0–0
Sfîntul Gheorghe	1–0	3–0	4–0	1–1	2–1	0–3	8–2	3–1	0–1	1–1	0–1		1–2
Zimbru-2 Chișinău	0–3	4–1	8–2	1–1	4–0	1–1	3–0	3–1	0–1	1–2	0–0	0–1	

Updated to match(es) played on 25 Aug 2013. Source: Football Association of Moldova
Legend: Blue = home team win; Yellow = draw; Red = away team win.

== Top goalscorers ==
Updated to matches played on 30 May 2014.

Rank	Player	Club	Goals
1	(Moldova) Alexandru Răilean	FC Sfîntul Gheorghe	20
2	(Moldova) Ilie Damașcan	Zimbru-2	17
3	(Moldova) Roman Șumchin	Gagauziya	15
3	(Moldova) Gheorghe Nicologlo	Saxan	15
5	(Moldova) Serghei Istrati	Saxan	14
