= 1999–2000 Moldovan "B" Division =

Moldovan "B" Division
- Season: 1999–2000

The 1999–2000 Moldovan "B" Division (Romanian: Divizia B) was the 9th season of Moldovan football's third-tier league. There are 27 teams in the competition, in two groups, 13 in the North and 14 in the South.

== "B" Division North ==
=== Final standings ===
Pos	Team	Pld	W	D	L	GF	GA	GD	Pts
1	Happy End Camenca	22	20	1	1	88	13	+75	61
2	TTA Strășeni	22	16	1	5	59	24	+35	49
3	FC Chițcani	22	13	7	2	37	14	+23	45 (Note: 1 point deducted for violation of regulations.)
4	Locomotiva Bălți	22	14	1	7	34	46	−12	43
5	Agasfer Chișinău	22	9	5	8	39	35	+4	32
6	UT Chișinău	22	9	4	9	15	27	−12	31
7	Roso Floreni	22	7	3	12	28	31	−3	24
8	Start Pîrlița	22	6	6	10	20	42	−22	24
9	Universul Popovca	22	4	8	10	23	39	−16	20
10	Gloria-Qvarc Edineț	22	5	1	16	18	24	−6	16
11	FC Braviceni	22	2	7	13	25	54	−29	13
12	Veterani Chișinău	22	2	6	14	24	61	−37	12
–	NVN Sireți (W)	0	0	0	0	0	0	0	0

(W) Withdrew after 6 rounds, their results were annulled.

== "B" Division South ==
=== Final standings ===
Pos	Team	Pld	W	D	L	GF	GA	GD	Pts
1	Trachia Taraclia	24	18	5	1	58	15	+43	59
2	Viişoara Mileştii Mici	24	17	5	2	47	13	+34	56
3	Sokol Chițcani	24	17	2	5	29	9	+20	53
4	Universitatea Comrat	24	13	7	4	52	17	+35	46
5	FC Cahul	24	14	2	8	62	23	+39	44
6	FC Congaz	24	11	5	8	50	39	+11	38
7	Victoria Bardar	24	8	6	10	26	28	−2	30
8	FC Corten	24	9	1	14	39	48	−9	27 (Note: 1 point deducted for violation of regulations.)
9	Rapid Cărpineni	24	6	6	12	21	49	−28	24
10	Locomotiva Basarabeasca	24	7	3	14	24	29	−5	24
11	FC Favorit Albota de Sus	24	6	4	14	14	49	−35	21
12	FC Tvardița	24	4	2	18	14	50	−36	14
13	Start Albota de Jos	24	2	0	22	15	82	−67	5
–	Zarea Hlinaia (W)	0	0	0	0	0	0	0	0

(W) Withdrew after 13 rounds, their results were annulled.
