= Irakli Chomakhashvili =

Georgian football Midfielder

Personal information
- Full name: Irakli Chomakhashvili
- Date of birth: 11 July 1991 (age 35)
- Place of birth: Tbilisi, Georgia
- Height: 1.79 m (5 ft 10 in)
- Position: Midfielder

Team information
- Current team: Ungheni
- Number: 24

Youth career
- 2008–2012: Leg-AZ academy

Senior career*
Years	Team	Apps	(Gls)
2014–2015	Cayelispor	10	(0)
2016–	Ungheni	22	(0)
- * Club domestic league appearances and goals as of 27 August 2016

Irakli Chomakhashvili (born 26 April 1995) is a Georgian football midfielder who plays for FC Ungheni.
