= 2008–09 Moldovan "A" Division =

Moldovan "A" Division
- Season: 2008–09
- Champions: Viitorul Orhei
- Promoted: Viitorul Orhei; Sfîntul Gheorghe
- Biggest home win: Sheriff-2 9-2 Mipan
- Biggest away win: Izvoraş 1-7 S.Gheorghe; Mipan 0:6 Sheriff-2

The 2008–09 Moldovan "A" Division season was the 18th since its establishment. A total of 17 teams contested the league.

== Stadiums and locations ==
Location of teams in "A" Division 2008–09

Club	Location
Cahul-2005	Cahul
CSCA-Buiucani	Chişinău
Dinamo-2	Bender
Eikomena	Chişinău
Floreni	Floreni
CF Gagauziya	Comrat
Intersport-Aroma	Cobusca Nouă
Izvoraş-67	Ratuş
Locomotiva	Bălţi
Mipan	Chişinău
Olimp	Ungheni
Podiş	Ineşti
Politehnica UTM	Chişinău
Sfîntul Gheorghe	Suruceni
Sheriff-2	Tiraspol
Viitorul	Orhei
Zimbru-2	Chişinău

== League table ==
Pos	Team	Pld	W	D	L	GF	GA	GD	Pts	Promotion or relegation
1	Viitorul Orhei (C, P)	30	20	3	7	59	36	+23	63	Promotion to 2009–10 Moldovan National Division
2	FC Podiș Inești	30	19	5	6	54	24	+30	62	
3	Locomotiva Bălţi	30	18	6	6	54	29	+25	60	
4	Gagauziya Comrat	30	16	7	7	58	28	+30	55	
5	FC Politehnica UTM	30	15	8	7	49	32	+17	53 (Note: CAH 1–0 POL; POL 2–0 CAH)	
6	Cahul-2005	30	16	5	9	35	18	+17	53	
7	Sheriff-2 Tiraspol	30	15	6	9	63	31	+32	51	
8	Intersport-Aroma	30	11	9	10	41	35	+6	42	
9	Dinamo-2 Bender	30	11	8	11	48	47	+1	41 (Note: DIN 6–0 BUI; BUI 3–0 DIN)	
10	CSCA–Buiucani Chişinău	30	11	8	11	40	36	+4	41	
11	Sfîntul Gheorghe (P)	30	10	4	16	41	46	−5	34	Promotion to 2009–10 Moldovan National Division (Note: FC Sfîntul Gheorghe Suruceni bought their way to Moldovan National Division due to the refusal of Tiligul-Tiras to participate in 2009-10 Moldovan National Division.)
12	Zimbru-2 Chișinău	30	8	6	16	33	47	−14	30 (Note: IZV 2–1 ZIM; ZIM 5–1 IZV)	
13	Izvoraş-67	30	9	3	18	37	79	−42	30	Folded (Note: Izvoraş-67 Ratuş did not participate in 2009–10 Moldovan "A" Division season.)
14	Olimp Ungheni	30	7	7	16	27	53	−26	28	
15	Mipan Chișinău	30	4	9	17	23	65	−42	21	
16	Eikomena P.A. (R)	30	3	0	27	18	74	−56	9	Relegation to 2009–10 Moldovan "B" Division (Note: FC Eikomena P.A. withdrew from the championship after the winter break and all their remaining matches were awarded 0-3 against them.)
0	FC Floreni (R)	0	0	0	0	0	0	0	0	Relegation to 2009–10 Moldovan "B" Division (Note: FC Floreni retired from the championship. All results were annulated.)

Source: Moldovan Football Federation (in Romanian)
Rules for classification: 1) points; 2) goal difference; 3) number of goals scored.
(C) Champions; (P) Promoted; (R) Relegated
