= Victor Negara =

Moldovan footballer

Personal information
- Date of birth: 14 July 1991 (age 35)
- Place of birth: Chișinău, Moldova
- Height: 1.79 m (5 ft 10 in)
- Position: Defender

Team information
- Current team: Spartanii Selemet
- Number: 21

Senior career*
Years	Team	Apps	(Gls)
2014–2016	Speranța Nisporeni	20	(0)
2016	Victoria Bardar	24	(1)
2016–2018	Dinamo-Auto	31	(0)
2019	Zaria Bălți	18	(0)
2019–	Spartanii Selemet	31	(0)
- * Club domestic league appearances and goals

Victor Negara (born 14 July 1991) is a Moldovan footballer who plays as a defender for Moldovan club Spartanii Selemet.
