= Artem Pestryakov =

Russian footballer

Artyom Pestryakov
Personal information
- Full name: Artyom Olegovich Pestryakov
- Date of birth: 30 July 1999 (age 27)
- Place of birth: Rostov-on-Don, Russia
- Height: 1.81 m (5 ft 11 in)
- Position: Midfielder

Team information
- Current team: Codru Lozova
- Number: 10

Youth career
- –2018: Viktor Ponedelnik Football Akademia
- 2018–2019: FK Yevpatoria

Senior career*
Years	Team	Apps	(Gls)
2020–2021	Codru Lozova	22	(3)
- * Club domestic league appearances and goals

Artyom Olegovich Pestryakov (Russian: Артём Олегович Пестряков; born 30 July 1999) is a Russian former footballer who played as a midfielder.

== Career statistics ==
=== Club ===
As of match played 26 May 2021

Club	Season	League			Cup		Continental		Other		Total	
Club	Season	Division	Apps	Goals	Apps	Goals	Apps	Goals	Apps	Goals	Apps	Goals
Codru Lozova	2020–21	Divizia Națională	22	3	1	0	–		0	0	23	3
Career total			22	3	1	0	0	0	0	0	23	3
