= FC Olimp Comrat =

Association football club in Moldova

Olimp Comrat
- Full name: Football Club Olimp Comrat
- Founded: 2013; 13 years ago
- Ground: Stadionul Viktor Mumzhiev
- Capacity: 4,488
- President: Nicolae Barladean
- Head coach: Valeriu Catană
- League: Liga 2
- 2025–26: Liga 1, Group A, 7th of 8 (relegated)

FC Olimp Comrat is a Moldovan football club based in Comrat, Moldova. They play in Liga 2, the third tier of Moldovan football.

== Honours ==
- Divizia B

Winners (1): 2019

- Roman Rostokin - top goal scorer of 2021–22 Moldovan Cup

== Stadium ==
Olimp Comrat will play their home matches at the Stadionul Viktor Mumzhiev which is due to open in spring 2021. It has a capacity of 5,000 spectators. Previously, the club played their home matches in Ceadîr-Lunga.

== Recent seasons ==
Season	League									Cup	Ref
Season	Division	Pos	Pld	W	D	L	GF	GA	Pts	Cup	Ref
2017	Divizia B (South)	4th	16	8	2	6	37	34	26	Second round	
2018	Divizia B (South)	3rd	12	7	1	4	28	23	22	First round	
2019	Divizia B (South)	↑ 1st	14	10	3	1	33	8	33	Second round	
2020–21	Divizia A	7th	26	11	5	10	51	44	38	First round	
