= FC Codru Lozova =

Association football club in Moldova

Codru Lozova
- Full name: Fotbal Club Codru Lozova
- Founded: 2008
- Dissolved: 11 August 2021
- Ground: Nicolae Simatoc Stadium
- Capacity: 1,100
- 2020–21: Divizia Națională, 10th of 10 (relegated)
Home colours	Away colours

FC Codru Lozova was a Moldovan football club based in Lozova, Moldova. The club spent two seasons in the Moldovan National Division, the first tier of Moldovan football.

== History ==
FC Codru started in the third tier and earned promotion in the 2014–15 season, finishing second in the Centre division. In the 2018 season, they were promoted from the second tier, finishing in first place. They made their debut in the top division in the 2019 season, finishing 8th out of 8 teams. They avoided relegation after winning the relegation play-off against CSF Spartanii Selemet, but were relegated the following season. Codru were dissolved on 11 August 2021 when they merged with CS Atletic Strășeni.

== Honours ==
- Divizia A
  - Winners (1): 2018

== Recent seasons ==
Season	League									Cup	Ref
Season	Division	Pos	Pld	W	D	L	GF	GA	Pts	Cup	Ref
2014–15	Divizia B (Centre)	↑ 2nd	18	10	3	5	48	26	33	1st preliminary round	
2015–16	Divizia A	8th	26	8	8	10	44	51	32	Round of 16	
2016–17	Divizia A	13th	28	8	3	17	48	81	27	Round of 16	
2017	Divizia A	11th	18	3	5	10	24	41	14	First round	
2018	Divizia A	↑ 1st	22	14	6	2	53	20	48	Round of 16	
2019	Divizia Națională	8th (Note: Avoided relegation after winning the relegation play-off)	28	0	5	23	8	55	5	Quarter-finals	
2020–21	Divizia Națională	↓ 10th	36	2	3	31	26	119	9	Quarter-finals	
