= FC Ungheni =

Ungheni
- Full name: Clubul de Fotbal Ungheni
- Founded: 2012
- Dissolved: 2019
- 2019: Divizia A, 13th of 15 (withdrew)

CF Ungheni (also named FC Ungheni) was a Moldovan football club from Ungheni. The club was founded in 2012 and most recently played in the Divizia A, the second tier of Moldovan football. It previously spent one season in the Divizia Națională, the top division.

== Honours ==
- Divizia B

Winners (1): 2014–15

== List of seasons ==
Season	League									Cup	Ref
Season	Division	Pos	Pld	W	D	L	GF	GA	Pts	Cup	Ref
2012–13	Divizia B (North)	2nd	16	9	3	4	40	24	30	First round	
2013–14	Divizia B (North)	6th	18	6	5	7	39	32	23	First round	
2014–15	Divizia B (Centre)	↑ 1st	18	14	2	2	58	21	44	1st preliminary round	
2015–16	Divizia A	↑ 4th	26	14	4	8	49	38	46	Round of 16	
2016–17	Divizia Națională	↓ 11th	30	4	5	21	19	79	17	Second round	
2017	Divizia A	10th	18	4	6	8	26	33	18	Second round	
2018	Divizia A	7th	22	7	7	8	50	65	28	First round	
2019	Divizia A	↓ 13th	28	9	3	16	55	83	30	Second round	
