= FC Sheriff-2 Tiraspol =

Sheriff-2 Tiraspol
- Full name: Fotbal Club Sheriff-2 Tiraspol
- Founded: 4 April 1997
- Ground: Sheriff Stadium, Tiraspol, Moldova
- Capacity: 14,000
- President: Viktor Gushan
- Manager: Shota Makharadze
- League: Liga 2
- 2025–26: Liga 1, Group 2, 8th of 8 (relegated)
Home colours	Away colours

FC Sheriff-2 Tiraspol is the reserve team of Sheriff Tiraspol. They play in the Liga 2, the third tier of Moldovan football. Despite winning seven Divizia A titles, they are denied promotion into the first tier solely because Sheriff and Sheriff-2 can't play in the same division.

== Honours ==
- Divizia A

Winners (7): 1999–2000, 2000–01, 2007–08, 2011–12, 2014–15, 2016–17, 2021–22

- Divizia B

Winners (1): 1997–98

== Current squad ==
As of 13 May 2022

Note: Flags indicate national team as defined under FIFA eligibility rules; some limited exceptions apply. Players may hold more than one non-FIFA nationality.

No.	Pos.	Nation	Player
1	GK	MDA	Serghei Savocica
9	FW	MDA	Dumitru Pogreban
10	FW	MDA	Evgheni Gliga
11	DF	MDA	Nicolai Covalschi
14	MF	MDA	Artiom Jaloba
15	MF	MDA	Vlad Colis
16	MF	MDA	Stanislav Gresciuc
17	MF	MDA	Adrian Hatman
18	FW	MDA	Nichita Covali
22	MF	MDA	Artiom Ivanov

No.	Pos.	Nation	Player
23	MF	MDA	Roman Scurtul
24	DF	MDA	Vladislav Costin
25	GK	MDA	Andrei Filipov
26	DF	MDA	Danila Ignatov
33	GK	MDA	Roman Dumenco
35	DF	MDA	Danila Ichim
44	FW	MDA	Alizade Carmanov
55	FW	MDA	Dan-Angelo Botan
90	DF	MDA	Artiom Dijinari
98	MF	MDA	Pavel Cucereavenco

== List of seasons ==
Season	League									Ref
Season	Division	Pos	Pld	W	D	L	GF	GA	Pts	Ref
1997–98	Divizia B	1st (Note: Promoted)	28	26	1	1	125	4	79	
1998–99	Divizia A	2nd	30	21	5	4	77	26	68	
1999–2000	Divizia A	1st	26	19	4	3	53	16	61	
2000–01	Divizia A	1st	30	21	6	3	67	18	69	
2001–02	Divizia A	3rd	30	17	5	8	46	28	56	
2002–03	Divizia A	6th	26	11	8	7	33	17	41	
2003–04	Divizia A	3rd	30	19	4	7	72	26	61	
2004–05	Divizia A	4th	30	19	8	3	76	22	65	
2005–06	Divizia A	2nd	28	20	5	3	71	28	65	
2006–07	Divizia A	9th	26	9	6	11	48	35	33	
2007–08	Divizia A	1st	32	24	3	5	79	19	75	
2008–09	Divizia A	7th	30	15	6	9	63	31	51	
2009–10	Divizia A	6th	30	15	6	9	38	26	51	
2010–11	Divizia A	5th	28	15	5	8	64	26	50	
2011–12	Divizia A	1st	30	21	6	3	75	27	69	
2012–13	Divizia A	2nd	28	20	4	4	79	21	64	
2013–14	Divizia A	4th	24	12	6	6	44	19	42	
2014–15	Divizia A	1st	22	15	4	3	53	14	49	
2015–16	Divizia A	2nd	26	19	2	5	64	25	59	
2016–17	Divizia A	1st	28	22	2	4	94	19	68	
2017	Divizia A	2nd	17	11	5	1	56	17	38	
2018	Divizia T-R (Note: In 2018 and 2019, reserve teams took part in their own league, the Divizia Tineret-Rezerve)	2nd	28	20	4	4	79	17	64	
2019	Divizia T-R	1st	28	25	2	1	116	15	77	
2020–21	Divizia A	3rd	26	17	3	6	46	24	54	
2021–22	Divizia A	1st	22	15	4	3	49	15	49	
