= Izvoraș-67 =

Izvoraş-67
- Full name: Izvoraş-67 Ratuș
- Founded: 1967
- Dissolved: 2009
- Ground: Complexul Sportiv Izvoraş; Ratuș, Moldova
- Capacity: 4,000
- 2008–09: Moldovan "A" Division, 13th

Izvoraş-67 was a Moldovan football club based in Ratuș, Moldova. They have played in the Moldovan "A" Division, the second division in Moldovan football in season 2008–09 and won Division B North.

== Achievements ==
- Divizia B

Winners (1): 2005–06
