= FC Sucleia =

Moldovan football club

Sucleia
- Full name: Fotbal Club Sucleia
- Founded: 2018
- Dissolved: 2023; 3 years ago (merged with Saksan)
- Ground: Stadionul orășenesc, Ceadîr-Lunga; Ceadîr-Lunga, Moldova
- Capacity: 2,000
- Manager: Iurie Blonari

FC Sucleia was a Moldovan football club. They last played in the Liga 1. They merged and became Saksan in 2023. Their home matches were played in Ceadîr-Lunga.

== Honours ==
- Divizia B

Winners (1): 2019
