= FCM Ungheni =

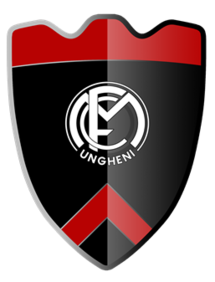
- Full name: Fotbal Club Municipal Ungheni
- Founded: 2000
- Ground: Ungheni Stadium, Ungheni
- Capacity: 1,000
- Chairman: Serghei Mutu
- Manager: Dorin Bambuleac
- League: Liga 1
- 2025–26: Liga 1, Group 2, 1st of 8
Home colours	Away colours

Fotbal Club Municipal Ungheni, commonly known as FCM Ungheni, is a Moldovan football club based in Ungheni, Moldova. They were founded in 2000 and they play in Liga 1, the second division in Moldovan football.

== History ==
The club was found in 2000 by the local authorities as FCM Ungheni and took part in Moldovan "B" Division. In season 2003–04 club was overtaken by local businessman Ghenadie Mitriuc and renamed to FC Spartac. The authorities did not accept this and took the club back and renamed it again, this time to FC Moldova-03. In season 2005–06 team had a debut in Moldovan "A" Division. In 2007 club suffers from financial problems. Local authorities doesn't support it anymore. Thus Ghenadie Mitriuc (at that time vice mayor) again takes club under his control.

=== Previous names of the club ===
- 2000–2003 – FCM Ungheni
- 2003–2004 – FC Spartac Ungheni
- 2004–2007 – FC Moldova-03 Ungheni
- 2007–2008 – FCM Ungheni
- 2008–2011 – FC Olimp Ungheni
- 2011-2017 – CS Moldova-03 Ungheni
- Since 2017 - FCM Ungheni

== Honours ==
- Moldovan "B" Division

Winners (1): 2020-21

== League results ==
Season	Div.	Pos.	Pl.	W	D	L	GS	GA	P	Cup	Europe	Top Scorer (League)	Head Coach
2000–01	3rd "North"	6	16	5	3	8	22	28	18	?	—		(Moldova) Ion Homițchi
2001–02	3rd "North"	13	26	5	5	16	25	63	20	?	—		(Moldova) Ion Homițchi
2002–03	3rd "North"	7	24	9	7	8	41	35	34	?	—		(Moldova) Ion Homițchi
2003–04	3rd "North"	?	?	?	?	?	?	?	?	?	—		(Moldova) Anatol Bacaleț
2004–05	3rd "North"	3	24	13	5	6	51	32	44	?	—		
2005–06	2nd	12	28	6	6	16	27	66	24	?	—		
2006–07	2nd	13	26	3	4	19	21	40	13	Round 32	—		
2007–08	2nd	16	32	7	4	21	24	81	25	Round 16	—		
2008–09	2nd	14	30	7	7	16	27	53	28	Round 32	—		
2009–10	2nd	13	30	6	6	18	34	66	24	Round 8	—		
2010–11	2nd	14	28	4	7	17	31	75	19	Round 32	—		
2011–12	3rd "North"	11	20	3	3	14	24	68	12		—		
2012–13	not participated												
