= Ghenadie Orbu =

Moldovan footballer

Personal information
- Date of birth: 8 July 1982 (age 44)
- Place of birth: Chișinău, Moldavian SSR, Soviet Union
- Height: 1.67 m (5 ft 6 in)
- Position: Forward

Team information
- Current team: Victoria Bardar
- Number: 9

Senior career*
Years	Team	Apps	(Gls)
2001–2015	Dacia Chișinău	361	(91)
2015	→ Dinamo-Auto Tiraspol (loan)	11	(2)
2015	Speranța Nisporeni	3	(0)
2015–2016	Codru Lozova	21	(22)
2016–2024	Victoria Bardar	128	(89)
2025–	Real Sireți	0	(0)

International career^{‡}
2002	Moldova	1	(0)
- * Club domestic league appearances and goals as of 10 September 2016 ‡ National team caps and goals as of 20 October 2015

Ghenadie Orbu (born 8 July 1982) is a Moldovan professional footballer who plays as a striker for Real Sireți.
