= FC Sîngerei =

Sîngerei
- Full name: Fotbal Club Sîngerei
- Founded: 2011
- Ground: Stadionul Sîngerei; Sîngerei, Moldova
- Capacity: 1,500
- Chairman: Viorel Onceanu
- Manager: Eugen Cucoş
- League: Divizia B
- 2019: Divizia A, 14th of 15 (relegated)
Home colours	Away colours	Third colours

FC Sîngerei is a Moldovan football club based in Sîngerei, Moldova. They play in the Divizia B, the third tier of Moldovan football.

== Achievements ==
- Divizia B

Winners (1): 2015–16
