= FC Real Succes Chișinău =

Association football club in Moldova

Real Succes Chișinău
- Full name: Real Succes Football Club
- Founded: 31 May 2002; 24 years ago
- Ground: Real Succes; Chișinău, Moldova
- President: Veaceslav Maximov
- Head coach: Oleg Fistican
- League: Liga 2
- 2025–26: Liga 2, South Series, 2nd of 10
Home colours

Real Succes Chișinău is a Moldovan professional football club based in Chișinău, that competes in the Moldovan Liga 2.

== History ==
Football Club Real-Succes was founded in 2002 and was registered in Hîrtopul Mare. The same year they participated in 2008–09 Moldovan "B" Division and finished 10th. In summer 2009 they merged with amateur football club Lilcora to form a new club RS Lilcora and moved to Chișinău.
