= FC Dava Soroca =

- Full name: Football Club Dava Soroca
- Founded: 2009
- Ground: Stadionul Orăşenesc; Soroca, Moldova
- Capacity: 2,500
- Manager: (Moldova) Vasile Zăbrian
- League: Moldovan "B" Division (North)
- 2010–11: 3rd (North)

FC Dava is a Moldovan football club based in Soroca, Moldova. They play in the Moldovan "B" Division, the third division in Moldovan football.

== League results ==
Season	Div.	Pos.	Pl.	W	D	L	GS	GA	P	Cup	Europe	Top Scorer (League)	Head Coach (Moldova) Vasile Zabrian
2009–10	3rd "North"	5_{/13}	24	13	7	4	58	32	46	Round of 16	—		(Moldova) Vasile Zabrian
2010–11	3rd "North"	3_{/10}	18	9	4	5	30	21	31	Round of 32	—		(Moldova) Vasile Zabrian
2016–17	3rd "North"	6_{/11}	19	7	4	8	23	26	25	2nd PR	—	(Moldova) Usatii Denis	(Moldova) Pavel Bachinin
