= FC Edineț =

Edineț
- Full name: Football Club Edineț
- Founded: 2011
- Ground: Stadionul Orasenesc; Edineț, Moldova
- Capacity: 300
- Chairman: Iacob Besleaga
- League: Liga 2
- 2025–26: Liga 2, North Series, 6th of 10

Football Club Edineț is a Moldovan football club based in Edineț, Moldova. They play in Liga 2, the third tier of Moldovan football.
