= FC Maiak Chirsova =

Maiak Chirsova
- Full name: Football Club Maiak Chirsova
- Founded: 1952
- Ground: Stadionul Sătesc; Chirsova, Moldova
- Capacity: 1,000
- Manager: Ivan Zlatovcen
- League: Liga 2
- 2025–26: Liga 2, South Series, 8th of 10
Home colours	Away colours

FC Maiak Chirsova is a Moldovan football club based in Chirsova, Moldova. They play in Liga 2, the third tier of Moldovan football.

== League results ==
Season	Div.	Pos.	Pl.	W	D	L	GS	GA	P	Cup	Top Scorer (League)	Head Coach
1999–2000	2nd	11_{/16}	26	7	4	15	26	46	25	?		(Moldova) Ivan Zlatovcen
2000–01	2nd	16_{/16}	30	3	3	24	18	82	12	?		(Moldova) Ivan Zlatovcen
2003–04	2nd	16_{/16}	30	0	0	30	7	121	0	?		(Moldova) Ivan Zlatovcen
2007–08	3rd "South"	8_{/9}	16	5	0	11	22	50	15	1st PR		(Moldova) Ivan Zlatovchen
2008–09	3rd "South"	9_{/13}	24	7	4	13	37	56	25	1st PR		(Moldova) Ivan Zlatovchen
2009–10	3rd "South"	5_{/14}	26	13	3	10	54	39	42	?		(Moldova) Ivan Zlatovchen
2010–11	3rd "South"	2_{/10}	18	11	2	5	38	27	35	1st PR		(Moldova) Ivan Zlatovchen
2011–12	3rd "South"	1_{/10}	18	13	3	2	44	23	42	1st PR	(Moldova) Ilya Dragan – 19	(Moldova) Ivan Zlatovchen
2012–13	2nd	15_{/16}	28	3	2	23	34	123	11		(Moldova) Ilie Dragan – 12	(Moldova) Ivan Zlatovcen

== Achievements ==
- Divizia B

Winners (1): 2011–12 (South)
Runners-up (1): 2010–11 (South)
