= FC Cahul-2005 =

Cahul-2005
- Full name: Football Club Cahul-2005
- Founded: 1980; 2005 (reformed)
- Dissolved: 2022 (senior section)
- Ground: Cahul Stadium, Cahul
- Capacity: 1000
- 2021–22: Divizia A, 12th of 12 (relegated)
Home colours	Away colours

FC Cahul-2005 was a Moldovan football club based in Cahul, Moldova. The club was founded in 1980 as FC Cahul and after they changed their name and reformed in 2005, they played in the Moldovan "A" Division, the second division in Moldovan football.

== History ==
The club was founded in 1980 as FC Cahul and played in the Moldovan regional championships until independence from the Soviet Union.

They took part in the first championship of the second division obtaining promotion to Divizia Națională. The 1992-1993 championship was the only one played in the top flight, at the end of the season they were relegated again to Divizia A.

In 2005 they changed their name to Cahul-2005 continuing to play championships between the second and third divisions.

After the 2021–22 season, the senior team was completely disbanded. Under the name Cahul-2005, only junior teams exist from the 2022–23 season.

== League results ==
Season	Div.	Pos.	Pl.	W	D	L	GS	GA	P	Cup	Europe	Top Scorer (League)	Head Coach
2006–07	3rd "South"	1	22	19	2	1	72	13	59	Round of 8	—		(Moldova) Vasile Porosenco
2007–08	2nd	8	32	14	5	13	44	43	47	Round of 64	—		(Moldova) Vasile Porosenco
2008–09	2nd	6	30	16	5	9	35	18	53	Round of 32	—		(Moldova) Vasile Porosenco
2009–10	2nd	4	30	16	5	9	44	33	53	Round of 8	—		(Moldova) Vasile Porosenco
2010–11	2nd	7	28	13	5	10	35	40	44	Quarter-finals	—		(Moldova) Vasile Porosenco

== Achievements ==
- Divizia B

Winners (4) : 2006–07, 2012–13, 2014–15, 2016–17
