= Football in Moldova =

- Country: Moldova
- Governing body: Moldovan Football Federation (FMF)
- National teams: Men's national team Women's national team

National competitions
- Cupa Moldovei; Supercupa Moldovei

Club competitions
- Liga; Liga 1; Liga 2

International competitions
- Champions League; Europa League; Conference League; Super Cup; FIFA Club World Cup; FIFA World Cup (national team); European Championship (national team); UEFA Nations League (national team)

After gaining its independence from the Soviet Union in 1991, Moldova became a member of FIFA in 1994. Football is the most popular sport in Moldova. 30% of Moldovians consider themselves football fan. The other post-Soviet states with an equal or higher percentage are Armenia, Azerbaijan, Belarus, Estonia, Georgia, Kyrgyzstan, Latvia, Lithuania, Russia, Ukraine and Uzbekistan.

== National team ==
The national team has limited international success and have never qualified for a European Championship or World Cup.

In UEFA Euro 2004 qualifiers, Moldova beat Austria 1–0 and Belarus 2–1, but lost to the Netherlands 2–1.

In the 2006 FIFA World Cup qualifiers, their best results were winning against Belarus 2–0, and two home draws against Scotland and Norway. They also drew 2–2 against Bosnia and Herzegovina at home, and beat them 1–0 in the away game during the UEFA Euro 2008 qualifiers. In the same qualifications, they beat Hungary 3–0 and also drew 1–1 against Turkey.

== Domestic football ==
Sheriff Tiraspol is the most successful Moldovan football team and has won the most championships.

== League system ==
Level	League(s)/Division(s)
1	Liga; 8 clubs
	↓↑ 1–2 clubs
2	Liga 1; 12 clubs
	↓↑ 2 clubs
3	Liga 2; 20 clubs divided in 2 series of 10 clubs each

== Most successful clubs overall ==
As of 23 May 2026

local and lower league organizations are not included.

Club	Domestic Titles				
Club	Moldovan Liga	Moldovan Cup	Moldovan Super Cup	CIS Cup	Total
Sheriff Tiraspol	**21**	**14**	**7**	**2**	**44**
Zimbru Chișinău	8	6	1	-	15
Milsami Orhei	2	2	2	-	6
Petrocub Hîncești	2	2	-	-	4
Tiraspol	1	3	-	-	4
Tiligul-Tiras Tiraspol	-	3	-	-	3
Dacia Chișinău	1	-	1	-	2
Sfîntul Gheorghe	-	1	1	-	2
Bălți	-	1	-	-	1
Bugeac Comrat	-	1	-	-	1
Iskra-Stal	-	1	-	-	1
Nistru Otaci	-	1	-	-	1

- The articles in italic indicate the defunct leagues and the defunct cups.
- The figures in **bold** indicate the most times this competition has been won by a team.

== Attendances ==
The average attendance per top-flight football league season and the club with the highest average attendance:

Season	League average	Best club	Best club average
2024-25	1,018	Sheriff	3,120
