= CSF Spartanii Sportul =

Association football club in Moldova

Spartanii Sportul
- Full name: Clubul Sportiv de Fotbal Spartanii Sportul
- Nickname: Spartanii (The Spartans)
- Founded: 2011; 15 years ago as Sparta Selemet
- Ground: Real Succes (Chișinău)
- Capacity: 150
- President: Yaw Amponsah
- Head coach: Igor Ursachi
- League: Liga 1
- 2025–26 2025–26: Liga, 8th of 8 (relegated); Liga 1, 3rd of 6
Home colours	Away colours

Clubul de Fotbal Spartanii Sportul, commonly known as Spartanii Sportul, is a Moldovan professional football club from Selemet with its legal address in Chișinău.The team competes in the Liga 1, the second tier of Moldovan football and plays its home matches at the Real Succes Stadium in Chișinău.

== Squad ==
As of 10 April 2026

Note: Flags indicate national team as defined under FIFA eligibility rules; some limited exceptions apply. Players may hold more than one non-FIFA nationality.

No.	Pos.	Nation	Player
1	GK	MDA	Daniel Vîrlan
2	DF	MDA	Daniil Șevcenco
3	DF	MDA	Dan Proaspăt
4	DF	MDA	Mihail Țăranu
5	DF	MDA	Andrei Sosnovschi
6	DF	MDA	Vasile Caraman
8	MF	NGR	Ganiu Olaniyan
9	FW	BRB	Devonte Richards
10	FW	GHA	Nicholas Mensah
11	FW	MDA	Marius Muntean

No.	Pos.	Nation	Player
12	GK	MDA	Pavel Blaghi
13	MF	MDA	Ruslan Harb
14	DF	GBS	Jorge Ocante
15	MF	MDA	Daniel Stroici
16	MF	BRB	Zachary Applewhite
17	MF	MDA	Maxim Danilov
18	DF	MDA	Alex Gutium
19	FW	MDA	Cristian Stancă
23	DF	MDA	Vladislav Zavalișca
24	DF	MDA	Igor Arhirii (captain)
41	MF	ISR	Shon Weisz

== Honours ==
- Divizia B (level 3)

Winners (2): 2015–16, 2018
