= Moldovan Liga 2 =

Association football league in Moldova

Liga 2
- Organising body: FMF
- Founded: 1992; 34 years ago
- Country: Moldova
- Confederation: UEFA
- Number of clubs: 20
- Level on pyramid: 3
- Promotion to: Liga 1
- Relegation to: Regional leagues
- Domestic cup: Cupa Moldovei
- Current champions: Vulturii Cutezători (2nd title); Național Ialoveni (1st title) (2025–26)
- Most championships: Viișoara Mileștii Mici (5 titles)
- Website: fmf.md
- Current: 2026–27 Moldovan Liga 2

Liga 2 is the third-level division of Moldovan Football. There are 20 teams in the competition, and they are divided into two groups, the North group and the South group.

== Champions ==
Season	North Champions	South Champions	Center Champions
2025–26	Vulturii Cutezatori	Național Ialoveni	—N/a
2024–25	Zimbru-2 Chișinău	Real Sireți	—N/a
2023–24	Vulturii Cutezatori	Stăuceni	—N/a
2022–23	Iskra Rîbnița	Univer-Oguzsport	—N/a
2021–22	Fălești	Văsieni	—N/a
2020–21	FCM Ungheni	Sporting Trestieni	—N/a
2019	Fălești	Olimp Comrat	Sucleia
2018	Speranța Drochia	Spartanii Selemet	Tighina
2017	Florești	Sparta Chișinău	Sireți
2016–17	Grănicerul Glodeni	Cahul-2005	—N/a
2015–16	Sîngerei	Sparta Selemet	Bogzești
2014–15	Spicul Chișcăreni	Cahul-2005	FC Ungheni
2013–14	Budăi	Rapid-2 Petrocub	Speranța
2012–13	Rîșcani	Cahul-2005	Viișoara Mileștii Mici
2011–12	Veris	Maiak Chirsova	Victoria Bardar
2010–11	Orhei Star	Saxan	Victoria Bardar
2009–10	Dinamo-Auto Tiraspol	Viișoara Mileștii Mici	—N/a
2008–09	Costuleni	Viișoara Mileștii Mici	—N/a
2007–08	Podiș Inești	Viișoara Mileștii Mici	—N/a
2006–07	Locomotiva Bălți	Cahul-2005	—N/a
2005–06	Izvoraș-67	Tighina-2	—N/a
2004–05	Petrocub Sărata-Galbenă	Fortuna Pleșeni	—N/a
2003–04	Viișoara Mileștii Mici	Olimp Tomai	—N/a
2002–03	Roso Floreni	Fortuna Pleșeni	—N/a
2001–02	Orhei	Politehnica-2 Chișinău	—N/a
2000–01	Tighina	Congaz	—N/a
1999–2000	Happy End Camenca	Trachia Taraclia	—N/a
1998–99	Inter Strășeni	Maiak Chirsova	—N/a
1997–98	Venita Lipcani	Sheriff-2 Tiraspol	—N/a
1996–97	Cristalul Ghindești	Tiras Tiraspol	—N/a
1995–96	Roma Bălți	ULIM Tebas Chișinău	Sindicat Chișinău
1994–95	Olimpia-2	Zimbru-2 Chișinău	Moldova Slobozia Mare
1993–94	Bucuria Chișinău	Constructorul Chișinău	Victoria Cahul
Season	Champions		
1992	Dumbrava Cojușna		

== Top Goalscoarers ==
Season	Name	Club
2021–22	Alexei Diordiev (20 goals)	Stăuceni
2022–23	Serghei Gheorghiev, Igor Țîgîrlaș (19 goals)	Univer-Oguzsport, Stăuceni
2023–24	Andrei Stratan (25 goals)	Visoca
2024–25	Andrei Stratan (39 goals)	Visoca
2025–26	Denis Secureanu (18 goals)	Vulturii Cutezători

== Performance by club ==
Club	Winners	Winning Years
Viișoara Mileștii Mici	5	2003–04, 2007–08, 2008–09, 2009–10, 2012–13
Cahul-2005	4	2006–07, 2012–13, 2014–15, 2016–17
Victoria Bardar	2	2010–11, 2011–12
Maiak Chirsova	2	1998–99, 2011–12
Orhei Star	2	2001–02, 2010–11
Fortuna Pleșeni	2	2002–03, 2004-05
Rapid-2 Petrocub	2	2004–05, 2013-14
Tighina	2	2000–01, 2018
Fălești	2	2019, 2021–22
Spartanii Selemet	2	2015–16, 2018
Zimbru-2 Chișinău	2	1994-95, 2024–25
Vulturii Cutezatori	2	2023–24, 2025–26
Dumbrava Cojușna	1	1992
Bucuria Chișinău	1	1993-94
Constructorul Chișinău	1	1993-94
Victoria Cahul	1	1993-94
Olimpia-2	1	1994-95
Moldova Slobozia Mare	1	1994-95
Roma Bălți	1	1995-96
ULIM Tebas Chișinău	1	1995-96
Sindicat Chișinău	1	1995-96
Cristalul Ghindești	1	1996-97
Tiras Tiraspol	1	1996-97
Venita Lipcani	1	1997-98
Sheriff-2 Tiraspol	1	1997-98
TTA Inter Strășeni	1	1998-99
Happy End Camenca	1	1999–00
Trachia Taraclia	1	1999–00
Congaz	1	2000–01
Politehnica-2 Chișinău	1	2001–02
Roso Floreni	1	2002–03
Olimp Tomai	1	2003–04
Izvoraș-67	1	2005–06
Tighina-2	1	2005–06
Locomotiva Bălți	1	2006–07
Podiș Inești	1	2007–08
Costuleni	1	2008–09
Dinamo-Auto Tiraspol	1	2009–10
Saxan	1	2010–11
Veris	1	2011–12
Rîșcani	1	2012–13
Budăi	1	2013–14
Speranța	1	2013–14
CF Ungheni	1	2014–15
Spicul Chișcăreni	1	2014–15
Bogzești	1	2015–16
Sîngerei	1	2015–16
Grănicerul Glodeni	1	2016–17
Florești	1	2017
Sparta Chișinău	1	2017
Sireți	1	2017
Speranța Drochia	1	2018
Olimp Comrat	1	2019
Sucleia	1	2019
FCM Ungheni	1	2020–21
Sporting Trestieni	1	2020–21
Văsieni	1	2021–22
Iskra Rîbnița	1	2022–23
Univer-Oguzsport	1	2022–23
Stăuceni	1	2023–24
Real Sireți	1	2024–25
Național Ialoveni	1	2025–26
