= FC Speranța Drochia =

Speranța Drochia
- Full name: Football Club Speranța Drochia
- Founded: 1976
- Ground: Complexul Sportiv Drochia
- Capacity: 5,000
- League: Liga 2
- 2025–26: Liga 2, North Series, 3rd of 10

FC Speranța Drochia is a Moldovan football club based in Drochia. They play in Liga 2, the third tier of Moldovan football.

== History ==
Founded in 1976, the club spent two seasons in the Soviet Second League, after which it played in the football championship of the Moldavian SSR. After Moldova's independence in 1991, Speranța played in the first three seasons of the Moldovan second tier, before the club was dissolved in 1996. In 2007, the club was revived as CS Drochia, playing in the third tier. In July 2016 the club returned to the old name Speranța Drochia, and in 2018 it was promoted to the second tier. In 2022, Speranța finished in 11th place out of 12 teams and were to be relegated back to the third tier. However, they kept their place in the league after another team, Iskra Rîbnița, were voluntarily relegated.

== Honours ==
- Divizia B

Winners (1): 2018
