= Club Fotbal Rîșcani =

Moldovan football club

Rîșcani
- Full name: Club Fotbal Rîșcani
- Founded: 2008
- Dissolved: 2024
- Ground: Stadionul Rîșcani; Rîșcani, Moldova
- Capacity: 4,000
- Website: http://ultras-riscani.ucoz.com/index/componenta_echipei/0-7

Club Fotbal Rîșcani was a Moldovan football club based in Rîșcani, Moldova.

== Achievements ==
- Divizia B

Winners (1): 2012–13
