= FC Grănicerul Glodeni =

Grănicerul Glodeni
- Full name: Fotbal Club Grănicerul Glodeni
- Founded: 16 August 2013
- Ground: Stadionul Glodeni; Glodeni, Moldova
- Capacity: 4,000
- Chairman: Nicolae Reaboi
- Manager: Nicolae Reaboi
- 2025–26: Liga 2, North Series, 10th of 10 (relegated)
Home colours	Away colours

FC Grănicerul Glodeni is a Moldovan football club based in Glodeni, Moldova. They won the Division B North group in the 2016–17 season.

== Achievements ==
- Divizia B

Winners (1): 2016–17
