= FC Sinteza Căușeni =

Sinteza Căușeni
- Full name: Fotbal Club Sinteza Căușeni
- Founded: 1992
- Ground: Stadionul Căușeni; Căușeni, Moldova
- Capacity: 1,500
- League: Moldovan "B" Division
- 2011–12: Moldovan "B" Division, 5th
Home colours	Away colours

Sinteza Căușeni is a Moldovan football club based in Căușeni, Moldova. Club was founded in 1992 and played in the second season of Moldovan National Division. Currently they plays in Moldovan "B" Division.
