= FC Slobozia Mare =

Slobozia Mare
- Full name: Club Fotbal Slobozia Mare
- Founded: 1958
- Dissolved: 2024
- Ground: Stadionul Slobozia Mare; Slobozia Mare, Moldova
- Capacity: 2,000

FC Slobozia Mare was a Moldovan football club based in Slobozia Mare, Moldova. They last played in the Divizia B, the third tier of Moldovan football.

== Honours ==
- Divizia B

Winners (1): 1994–95
