= FC Fălești =

Association football club in Moldova

Fălești
- Full name: Fotbal Club Fălești
- Founded: 1991; 35 years ago
- Ground: Fălești Stadium
- Capacity: 4,300
- President: Victor Tatian
- Head coach: Iurie Cinciuc
- League: Liga 1
- 2025–26: Liga 1, Group 2, 2nd of 8

Fotbal Club Fălești is a Moldovan football club based in Fălești. They play in Liga 1, the second tier of Moldovan football.

== History ==
The club was founded in 1991 as FC Flacăra Fălești. In July 2013, it was renamed FC Fălești. The club played in the third tier until it was promoted to the second tier in 2019. In 2021, the club was relegated back to the third tier, but only one year later it was once again promoted to the second tier.

== Stadium ==
The club plays its home matches at the Fălești Stadium, which was renovated in 2022. It has a capacity of 4,300 seats. The club previously played its home matches in Bălți.

== Honours ==
- Divizia B

Winners (2): 2019, 2021–22
