= 2022–23 Moldovan Cup =

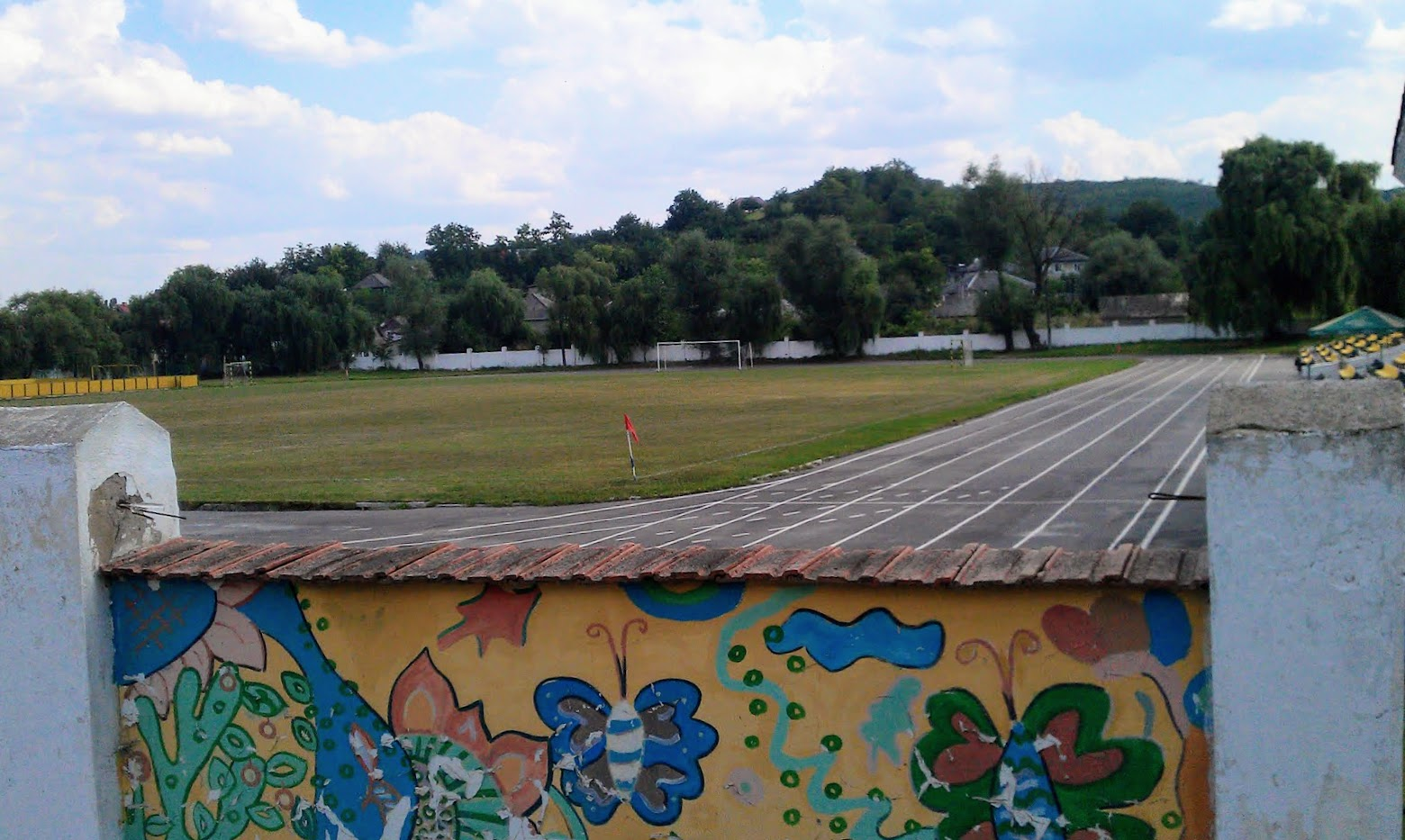
- Hîncești Stadium hosted the final

Tournament details
- Country: Moldova
- Dates: 17 August 2022 – 28 May 2023
- Teams: 44

Final positions
- Champions: Sheriff Tiraspol
- Runners-up: Bălți

Tournament statistics
- Matches played: 48
- Goals scored: 148 (3.08 per match)

The 2022–23 Moldovan Cup (Romanian: Cupa Moldovei) was the 32nd season of the annual Moldovan football cup competition. The competition started on 17 August 2022 with the preliminary round and concluded with the final on 28 May 2023.

== Format and Schedule ==
In the preliminary round and the first two rounds proper ties are formed on a geographical basis and there is no draw.

Round	Match dates	Fixtures	Clubs
Preliminary round	17 August 2022	4	44 → 40
First round	30–31 August 2022, 7 September 2022	16	40 → 24
Second round	14 September 2022	8	24 → 16
Round of 16	18–19 October 2022	8	16 → 8
Quarter-finals	4–5 March 2023 (1st leg); 5–6 April 2023 (2nd leg)	8	8 → 4
Semi-finals	26 April 2023 (1st leg); 3 May 2023 (2nd leg)	4	4 → 2
Final	28 May 2023	1	2 → 1

== Participating clubs ==
The following teams entered the competition:

Super Liga the 8 teams of the 2022–23 season	Liga 1 the 11 non-reserve teams of the 2022–23 season	Liga 2 the 25 non-reserve teams of the 2022–23 season
Sheriff Tiraspol ^{title holder}; Sfîntul Gheorghe ^{runner-up}; Petrocub Hîncești; Milsami Orhei; Bălți; Dinamo-Auto; Zimbru Chișinău; Dacia Buiucani	Florești; Victoria Chișinău; Spartanii Selemet; Speranis Nisporeni; Olimp Comrat; Sucleia; FCM Ungheni; Real Succes; Speranța Drochia; Fălești; Văsieni	Iskra Rîbnița; Sîngerei; Stăuceni; Edineț; Cricova; ~~Cruiz Plus~~; Slobozia Mare; Inter Soroca; Atletic Strășeni; Univer-Oguzsport; EFA Visoca; Cimișlia; Olimpia Bălți; Codru Călărași; Congaz; Pepeni; FC Visoca; Maiak Chirsova; Grănicerul Glodeni; Socol Copceac; Locomotiva Ocnița; Rîșcani; La Familia; Țarigrad; Vulturii Cutezători

== Preliminary round ==
8 clubs from the Liga 2 entered this round. Teams that finished higher on the league in the previous season played their ties away. 17 clubs from the Liga 2 received a bye for the preliminary round. Matches were played on 17 August 2022.

17 August 2022	Țarigrad (3)	2–2 (a.e.t.) (5–6 p)	Locomotiva Ocnița (3)	Țarigrad
17:30 EEST	Anghel 30'; Leșco 45'		Vladiuc 40'; Pavlov 69'	Stadium: Țarigrad Stadium; Referee: Dumitru Ciobanu

17 August 2022	Vulturii Cutezători (3)	1–2	Sîngerei (3)	Sîngerei
17:30 EEST	Țurcan 24'		Maga 74'; Mateițov 90+2'	Stadium: Sîngerei Stadium; Referee: Alexandru Stefciuc

17 August 2022	La Familia (3)	4–0	Cricova (3)	Bender
17:30 EEST	Țiverenco 14'; Bulat 50'; Schițenco 52'; Golubev 67'			Stadium: Șelcovic Stadium; Referee: Alexandru Gîrneț

17 August 2022	Socol Copceac (3)	2–2 (a.e.t.) (11–10 p)	Congaz (3)	Copceac
17:30 EEST	Copușciu 71', 100'		Gargalîc 90+2', 117'	Stadium: Copceac Stadium; Referee: Iurie Dogaru

== First round ==
21 clubs from the Liga 2 and 11 clubs from the Liga 1 entered this round. In a match, the home advantage was granted to the team from the lower league. If two teams are from the same division, the team that finished higher on the league in the previous season played their tie away. Matches were played on 30, 31 August and 7 September 2022.

Cruiz Plus (3)	w/o	Iskra Rîbnița (3)

30 August 2022	FC Visoca (3)	1–1 (a.e.t.) (4–3 p)	Inter Soroca (3)	Soroca
17:00 EEST	Pavalachi 54'		Ursu 77'	Stadium: Soroca Stadium; Referee: Veaceslav Morgun

30 August 2022	Grănicerul Glodeni (3)	1–2 (a.e.t.)	Speranța Drochia (2)	Glodeni
17:00 EEST	Pîslari 58'		Noroc 31', 118'	Stadium: Glodeni Stadium; Referee: Nicolae Bălțătescu

30 August 2022	Rîșcani (3)	1–2	Edineț (3)	Rîșcani
17:00 EEST	Mandalac 19'		Beștanco 1'; Eșanu 12'	Stadium: Rîșcani Stadium; Referee: Serghei Gavriliuc

30 August 2022	Codru Călărași (3)	0–1	FCM Ungheni (2)	Călărași
17:00 EEST			Cojocaru 69'	Stadium: Călărași Stadium; Referee: Valeriu Minciună

30 August 2022	EFA Visoca (3)	0–1	Florești (2)	Visoca
17:00 EEST			Boico 55'	Stadium: Visoca Stadium; Referee: Alexandru Stefciuc

30 August 2022	Pepeni (3)	1–0	Olimpia Bălți (3)	Pepeni
17:00 EEST	Maxian 79'			Stadium: Pepeni Stadium; Referee: Vitalie Cobzac

30 August 2022	Locomotiva Ocnița (3)	1–1 (a.e.t.) (4–2 p)	Fălești (2)	Ocnița
17:00 EEST	Murguleț 72'		Maneacov 44'	Stadium: Ocnița Stadium; Referee: Ion Tudos

30 August 2022	Sîngerei (3)	2–1	Speranis Nisporeni (2)	Sîngerei
17:00 EEST	Secureanu 75'; Mateițov 84'		Cristioglo 81'	Stadium: Sîngerei Stadium; Referee: Cătălin Pidghirnîi

30 August 2022	La Familia (3)	4–0	Real Succes (2)	Bender
17:00 EEST	Covali 18', 29'; Schițenco 38'; Voscalevschi 80' (o.g.)			Stadium: Șelcovic Stadium; Referee: Oleg Pînzari

30 August 2022	Atletic Strășeni (3)	1–3	Victoria Chișinău (2)	Lozova
17:00 EEST	Ulinici 80'		Orbu 10'; Gurgurov 57'; Stan 65'	Stadium: Simatoc Stadium; Referee: Vlad Marin

30 August 2022	Stăuceni (3)	2–1	Spartanii Selemet (2)	Stăuceni
17:00 EEST	Crudu 11'; Țîgîrlaș 45+1'		Danilov 61'	Stadium: Olimp Stadium; Referee: Alexandru Codreanu

30 August 2022	Univer-Oguzsport (3)	1–0	Sucleia (2)	Comrat
17:00 EEST	Botnarenco 57'			Stadium: Stadionul Viktor Mumzhiev; Referee: Gheorghe Dandeș

30 August 2022	Slobozia Mare (3)	1–4	Olimp Comrat (2)	Slobozia Mare
17:00 EEST	Caraivan 34'		Iliev 27'; Calaraș 59', 77'; Diacenco 63'	Stadium: Slobozia Mare Stadium; Referee: Iurie Dogaru

31 August 2022	Maiak Chirsova (3)	3–1 (a.e.t.)	Cimișlia (3)	Chirsova
17:00 EEST	D. Mihuță 6'; V. Mihuță 93'; Zlatovcen 108'		Teaca 39'	Stadium: Chirsova Stadium; Referee: Mihail Borisov

7 September 2022	Socol Copceac (3)	2–3 (a.e.t.)	Văsieni (2)	Copceac
16:00 EEST	Copușciu 13', 76'		Buga 62', 117'; Caragi 78'	Stadium: Copceac Stadium; Referee: Alexandru Smedu

== Second round ==
The 16 winners from the previous round entered this round. In a match, the home advantage was granted to the team from the lower league. If two teams are from the same division, the team that finished higher on the league in the previous season played their tie away. Matches were played on 14 September 2022.

14 September 2022	FC Visoca (3)	0–2	Speranța Drochia (2)	Soroca
16:00 EEST			Trofan 78'; Gavrilița 85'	Stadium: Soroca Stadium; Referee: Andrei Cuziac

14 September 2022	Edineț (3)	0–2	Iskra Rîbnița (3)	Edineț
16:00 EEST			Popovici 49'; Tuluc 90'	Stadium: Edineț Stadium; Referee: Alexandru Stefciuc

14 September 2022	FCM Ungheni (2)	0–3	Florești (2)	Ungheni
16:00 EEST			Gavriușen 7'; Covcenco 9'; Holodov 70'	Stadium: Ungheni Stadium; Referee: Ion Tudos

14 September 2022	Locomotiva Ocnița (3)	1–0	Pepeni (3)	Ocnița
16:00 EEST	Pavlov 62'			Stadium: Ocnița Stadium; Referee: Dumitru Ciobanu

14 September 2022	La Familia (3)	3–0	Sîngerei (3)	Bender
16:00 EEST	Gheorghița 62'; Schițenco 68'; Zacon 89' (pen.)			Stadium: Șelcovic Stadium; Referee: Denis Ivlev

14 September 2022	Văsieni (2)	0–5	Victoria Chișinău (2)	Suruceni
16:00 EEST			Stan 15'; Cebotari 21'; Molla 52'; Drab 78'; Manole 90+2'	Stadium: Suruceni Stadium; Referee: Vitalie Cobzac

14 September 2022	Maiak Chirsova (3)	0–2	Stăuceni (3)	Chirsova
16:00 EEST			Țîgîrlaș 31', 90+2'	Stadium: Chirsova Stadium; Referee: Gheorghe Dandeș

14 September 2022	Univer-Oguzsport (3)	2–0	Olimp Comrat (2)	Comrat
16:00 EEST	Gheorghiev 34' (pen.); Borovschi 74'			Stadium: Stadionul Viktor Mumzhiev; Referee: Mihail Borisov

== Final stage ==
=== Bracket ===
Round of 16
La Familia	0
Sfîntul Gheorghe (a.e.t.)	5
Zimbru Chișinău	3
Victoria Chișinău	0
Bălți	4
Stăuceni	0
Dinamo-Auto	0
Univer-Oguzsport (a.e.t.)	2
Iskra Rîbnița	0
Dacia Buiucani	7
Speranța Drochia	0
Sheriff Tiraspol	6
Locomotiva Ocnița	0
Milsami Orhei	2
Florești	2 (2)
Petrocub Hîncești (a.e.t.) (p)	2 (4)

Quarter-finals
Sfîntul Gheorghe (a.e.t.) (p)	0	3	3 (7)
Zimbru Chișinău	0	3	3 (6)
Bălți	5	4	9
Univer-Oguzsport	0	1	1
Dacia Buiucani	0	1	1
Sheriff Tiraspol	3	3	6
Milsami Orhei	0	1	1
Petrocub Hîncești	3	3	6

Semi-finals
Sfîntul Gheorghe	1	1	2
Bălți (a.e.t.)	0	3	3
Sheriff Tiraspol	2	1	3
Petrocub Hîncești	0	0	0

Final
Bălți	0 (6)
Sheriff Tiraspol (a.e.t.) (p)	0 (7)

== Round of 16 ==
The 8 winners from the previous round and 8 clubs from the Super Liga entered this round. The home teams and the pairs were determined in a draw held on 20 September 2022. Matches were played on 18 and 19 October 2022.

18 October 2022	Iskra Rîbnița (3)	0–7	Dacia Buiucani (1)	Rîbnița
13:00 EEST			Lupașco 51'; Galușca 55'; Josan 59', 71'; Martin 64' (pen.), 75'; Rebeja 74'	Stadium: Rîbnița Stadium; Referee: Ion Orlic

18 October 2022	Locomotiva Ocnița (3)	0–2	Milsami Orhei (1)	Edineț
13:00 EEST			Gînsari 82'; Camara 86'	Stadium: Edineț Stadium; Referee: Ion Tudos

18 October 2022	La Familia (3)	0–5 (a.e.t.)	Sfîntul Gheorghe (1)	Bender
13:00 EEST			Pozatzidis 94', 108'; Bunga 96', 112'; Ojog 114'	Stadium: Bender Stadium; Referee: Roman Jitari

18 October 2022	Dinamo-Auto (1)	0–2 (a.e.t.)	Univer-Oguzsport (3)	Tîrnauca
13:00 EEST			Pulucciu 93'; Uzun 100'	Stadium: Dinamo-Auto; Referee: Iurie Covtun

19 October 2022	Speranța Drochia (2)	0–6	Sheriff Tiraspol (1)	Drochia
13:00 EEST			Ankudinov 9'; Botos 18', 40'; Ambri 26' (pen.); Hatman 54'; Ignatov 66'	Stadium: Drochia Stadium; Referee: Andrei Ceban

19 October 2022	Florești (2)	2–2 (a.e.t.) (2–4 p)	Petrocub Hîncești (1)	Bender
13:00 EEST	Pleșco 36'; Bilinschi 86'		Butucel 7'; Potîrniche 26'	Stadium: Bender Stadium; Referee: Andrei Cojocaru

19 October 2022	Zimbru Chișinău (1)	3–0	Victoria Chișinău (2)	Chișinău
16:00 EEST	Damașcan 10'; Bejan 52', 64'			Stadium: Zimbru Stadium; Referee: Denis Ivlev

19 October 2022	Bălți (1)	4–0	Stăuceni (3)	Bălți
17:00 EEST	Danu 57'; Rusnac 78', 85'; Mișcov 90+2'			Stadium: Bălți Stadium; Referee: Veaceslav Banari

== Quarter-finals ==
The 8 winners from the previous round entered the quarter-finals. The home teams in the first legs were determined in a draw held on 25 October 2022. The first legs were played on 4 and 5 March 2023 and the second legs on 5 and 6 April 2023.

Team 1	Agg.	Team 2	1st leg	2nd leg
Dacia Buiucani	1–6	Sheriff Tiraspol	0–3	1–3
Milsami Orhei	1–6	Petrocub Hîncești	0–3	1–3
Sfîntul Gheorghe	3–3 (7–6 p)	Zimbru Chișinău	0–0	3–3 (a.e.t.)
Bălți	9–1	Univer-Oguzsport	5–0	4–1

=== First leg ===
4 March 2023	Dacia Buiucani (1)	0–3	Sheriff Tiraspol (1)	Chișinău
14:00 EET		Report	López 41', 45'; Origbaajo 69'	Stadium: Joma Arena; Attendance: 465; Referee: Ion Orlic

4 March 2023	Milsami Orhei (1)	0–3	Petrocub Hîncești (1)	Vadul lui Vodă
14:00 EET		Report	Plătică 11'; Mudrac 83'; Bejan 90+3'	Stadium: CPSM Stadium; Attendance: 200; Referee: Roman Jitari

5 March 2023	Sfîntul Gheorghe (1)	0–0	Zimbru Chișinău (1)	Chișinău
14:00 EET		Report		Stadium: CPTF Stadium; Attendance: 450; Referee: Dumitru Muntean

5 March 2023	Bălți (1)	5–0	Univer-Oguzsport (3)	Bălți
14:00 EET	Cojocari 4'; Moțpan 32'; Randriambololona 43'; Taira 45'; Yakovlev 76'	Report		Stadium: Bălți Stadium; Attendance: 1,000; Referee: Ion Tudos

=== Second leg ===
5 April 2023	Zimbru Chișinău (1)	3–3 (a.e.t.) (3–3 agg.) (6–7 p)	Sfîntul Gheorghe (1)	Chișinău
15:00 EEST	Dedechko 33', 55'; Alaribe 87'	Report	Căruntu 4', 63'; Calaidjoglu 45'	Stadium: Zimbru Stadium; Attendance: 150; Referee: Daniel Luca
	Penalties
	Dedov (penalty scored); Andronic (penalty missed); Ciopa (penalty scored); Sidorenco (penalty scored); Dedechko (penalty scored); Samiev (penalty missed); Macrițchii (penalty scored); Cucoș (penalty scored); Răileanu (penalty missed)		(penalty scored) Calaidjoglu; (penalty scored) Pozatzidis; (penalty missed) Borș; (penalty scored) Pușcaș; (penalty scored) Kau; (penalty missed) Lisu; (penalty scored) Ojog; (penalty scored) Ngah; (penalty scored) Ștefan

5 April 2023	Univer-Oguzsport (3)	1–4 (1–9 agg.)	Bălți (1)	Comrat
15:00 EEST	Dobrioglo 44'	Report	Nwautobo 61'; Neagu 74', 86'; Mișcov 82'	Stadium: Stadionul Viktor Mumzhiev; Attendance: 75; Referee: Victor Bughenco

5 April 2023	Sheriff Tiraspol (1)	3–1 (6–1 agg.)	Dacia Buiucani (1)	Tiraspol
17:00 EEST	Origbaajo 26'; Akanbi 54'; López 90+1'	Report	Dumbrava 63'	Stadium: Sheriff small Arena; Attendance: 175; Referee: Ion Bîlea

5 April 2023	Petrocub Hîncești (1)	3–1 (6–1 agg.)	Milsami Orhei (1)	Hîncești
17:00 EEST	Fedorov 33'; Jardan 45+1'; Dijinari 57' (o.g.)	Report	Dijinari 45'	Stadium: Hîncești Stadium; Attendance: 100; Referee: Iurie Covtun

The match was abandoned at half-time due to bad pitch condition caused by rain, and was resumed on Thursday 6 April 2023, 17:00 EEST, from the point of abandonment.

== Semi-finals ==
The 4 winners from the previous round entered the semi-finals. The home teams in the first legs were determined in a draw held on 11 April 2023. The first legs were played on 26 April 2023 and the second legs on 3 May 2023.

Team 1	Agg.	Team 2	1st leg	2nd leg
Sheriff Tiraspol	3–0	Petrocub Hîncești	2–0	1–0
Sfîntul Gheorghe	2–3	Bălți	1–0	1–3 (a.e.t.)

=== First leg ===
26 April 2023	Sfîntul Gheorghe (1)	1–0	Bălți (1)	Chișinău
16:00 EEST	Pozatzidis 76'	Report		Stadium: Zimbru-2; Attendance: 200; Referee: Igor Boșca

26 April 2023	Sheriff Tiraspol (1)	2–0	Petrocub Hîncești (1)	Tiraspol
18:00 EEST	Tapsoba 26'; Origbaajo 71'	Report		Stadium: Sheriff small Arena; Attendance: 520; Referee: Gabriel Tupicica

=== Second leg ===
3 May 2023	Petrocub Hîncești (1)	0–1 (0–3 agg.)	Sheriff Tiraspol (1)	Hîncești
19:00 EEST		Report	Tapsoba 47'	Stadium: Hîncești Stadium; Attendance: 1,080; Referee: Petru Stoianov

3 May 2023	Bălți (1)	3–1 (a.e.t.) (3–2 agg.)	Sfîntul Gheorghe (1)	Bălți
19:00 EEST	Moțpan 19'; Rusnac 73' (pen.); Randriambololona 116' (pen.)	Report	Ngah 58'	Stadium: Bălți Stadium; Attendance: 2,150; Referee: Denis Ivlev

== Final ==
The final was played on Sunday 28 May 2023 at the Municipal Stadium in Hîncești. The "home" team (for administrative purposes) was determined by an additional draw held on 4 May 2023.

28 May 2023
20:00 EEST

Bălți	0–0 (a.e.t.)	Sheriff Tiraspol
	Report
Penalties
Neagu (penalty scored); Moțpan (penalty scored); Rusnac (penalty scored); Furtună (penalty scored); Randriambololona (penalty missed); Cojocari (penalty scored); Yakovlev (penalty scored); Taira (penalty missed)	6–7	(penalty missed) Badolo; (penalty scored) Atiemwen; (penalty scored) Guedes; (penalty scored) Kiki; (penalty scored) Tambedou; (penalty scored) López; (penalty scored) Radeljić; (penalty scored) Diop

Municipal Stadium, Hîncești
Attendance: 1,185
Referee: Petru Stoianov (Moldova)

Bălți	Sheriff

GK	1	(Moldova) Stanislav Namașco
DF	6	(Gabon) Nathanael Mbourou	(yellow card) 120'
DF	14	(Equatorial Guinea) Federico Nsue
DF	22	(Moldova) Andrei Rusnac (c)	(yellow card) 101'
DF	31	(Brazil) Welington Taira
DF	44	(Moldova) Denis Furtună
MF	7	(Moldova) Nichita Moțpan	(yellow card) 53'
MF	9	(Kazakhstan) Vadim Yakovlev
MF	10	(Madagascar) Zotsara Randriambololona
MF	11	(Moldova) Daniel Danu		(substituted off) 72'
FW	24	(Moldova) Serafim Cojocari
Substitutes:
GK	16	(Moldova) Artur Nazarciuc
DF	3	(Moldova) Vladislav Boico
MF	2	(Argentina) Álvaro Bely
MF	21	(Moldova) Petru Neagu		(substituted on) 72'
FW	17	(Moldova) Serghei Mișcov
FW	18	(Moldova) Nichita Cambura
FW	19	(Nigeria) Miracle Nwautobo
Head Coach:
(Moldova) Veaceslav Rusnac

GK	35	(Ukraine) Maksym Koval
DF	4	(Zimbabwe) Munashe Garananga
DF	6	(Bosnia and Herzegovina) Stjepan Radeljić
DF	20	(Ivory Coast) Armel Zohouri	(yellow card) 59'	(substituted off) 117'
DF	42	(Brazil) Renan Guedes
MF	8	(Senegal) Mouhamed Diop	(yellow card) 114'
MF	10	(Burkina Faso) Cedric Badolo
MF	18	(Mali) Moussa Kyabou		(substituted off) 117'
MF	14	(Morocco) Amine Talal (c)		(substituted off) 88'
FW	11	(Brazil) Ricardinho		(substituted off) 99'
FW	30	(Burkina Faso) Abdoul Tapsoba	(yellow card) 58'	(substituted off) 117'
Substitutes:
GK	1	(Moldova) Dumitru Celeadnic
GK	40	(Ghana) Razak Abalora
DF	15	(Cameroon) Gaby Kiki		(substituted on) 117'
DF	29	(Moldova) Danila Ignatov
MF	12	(Niger) Abdoul Moumouni		(substituted on) 117'
MF	22	(Gabon) Christ Bekale
FW	9	(Argentina) Michael López		(substituted on) 99'
FW	19	(The Gambia) Bubacarr Tambedou		(substituted on) 88'
FW	31	(Moldova) Nichita Covali
FW	80	(Nigeria) Iyayi Atiemwen		(substituted on) 117'
FW	99	(Nigeria) Ismaila Origbaajo
Head Coach:
(Italy) Roberto Bordin

Assistant referees:
Vladislav Lifciu (Moldova)
Victor Mardari (Moldova)
Additional assistant referees:
Andrei Cojocaru (Moldova)
Ion Bîlea (Moldova)
Fourth official:
Artur Macovei (Moldova)

Match rules

- 90 minutes.
- 30 minutes of extra time if necessary.
- Penalty shoot-out if score is still level.
- Eleven named substitutes.
- Maximum of five substitutions, with a sixth allowed in extra time.
