= 2026–27 Moldovan Liga 1 =

Moldovan football's second-tier league

Liga 1
- Season: 2026–27
- Dates: 31 July 2026 – 15 May 2027

The 2026–27 Moldovan Liga 1 is the 36th season of Moldovan football's second-tier league. The season started on 31 July 2026 and will conclude on 15 May 2027, not including play-off matches.

== Teams ==
Location of teams in 2026–27 Liga 1

Club	Location	Ground	Capacity	Turf
Fălești	Fălești	Fălești Stadium	2,500	Artificial
Iskra	Rîbnița	Real Succes (Chișinău)	150	Artificial
Național	Ialoveni	Ialoveni Stadium	500	Artificial
Oguz	Comrat	Victor Mumjiev	4,430	Artificial
Spartanii Sportul	Selemet	Real Succes (Chișinău)	150	Artificial
Stăuceni	Stăuceni	Olimp Stadium	750	Natural
FCM Ungheni	Ungheni	Ungheni Stadium	350	Artificial
Univer	Comrat	Victor Mumjiev	4,430	Artificial
Victoria	Ialoveni	Ialoveni Stadium	500	Artificial
Vulturii Cutezători	Sîngerei	Sîngerei Stadium	1,500	Natural
Zimbru-2	Chișinău	CPTF Stadium (Note: Zimbru-2 Stadium in Chișinău used as home ground in 3 matches.)	2,000	Artificial

=== Personnel and kits ===
Team	Head coach	Captain	Kit maker	Kit sponsors	
Team	Head coach	Captain	Kit maker	Main	Other(s)
Fălești	(Moldova) Iurie Ciunciuc	(Moldova) Vitalie Daniliuc	Joma	None	
Iskra	(Moldova) Ilie Pinteac (Note: Andrian Bogdan (match 1) (Note: The team was led by the goalkeeping coach as head coach Ilie Pinteac was suspended and assistant coach Sergiu Epureanu was absent.), Sergiu Epureanu (matches 2–4) (Note: Ilie Pinteac was serving a four-match suspension and the assistant coach led the team.), Ilie Pinteac (matches 5–12))	(Moldova) Maxim Mihaliov	Macron	None	
Național	(Moldova) Vitalie Sula	(Moldova) Vladimir Ionaș	Who Made Who	Primăria Ialoveni (1), Bloom Invest (2)	List: Back: Primăria Ialoveni (2); Sleeves: Ghervas-Petrol, Sandra Ice Cream
Oguz	(Moldova) Viorel Frunză (Note: Ivan Tabanov (matches 1–3), Iurii Hodîchin (match 4))	(Moldova) Vladimir Covcenco	Hummel	Sana	None
Spartanii Sportul	(Moldova) Dumitru Gușilă (Note: Igor Ursachi (matches 1–4))	(Moldova) Daniel Vîrlan	Joma	None	
Stăuceni	(Moldova) Alexandru Glinca	(Moldova) Victor Beșeti	Macron	Primăria Stăuceni	List: Back: Electro Magazin, B&B Lider Company
FCM Ungheni	(Moldova) Dorin Bambuleac	(Moldova) Octavian Vatavu	Nike	Primăria Ungheni	List: Back: Consiliul Raional Ungheni
Univer	(Moldova) Alexandr Gheorghiev (Note: Alexandr Gheorghiev missed from the sideline in match 10.)	(Moldova) Maxim Uzun	Jako	None	
Victoria	(Moldova) Vasile Curchi	(Moldova) Toma Gîrbu	Joma	None	
Vulturii Cutezători	(Moldova) Dumitru Turcu	(Moldova) Ivan Urvanțev	Macron	La Iepurași	List: Front: Aqua UnIQa; Back: Aqua UnIQa; Shorts: Aqua UnIQa
Zimbru-2	(Moldova) Ghenadie Botgros	(Moldova) Macar Obrejan	Macron	Nova Post	List: Back: Geosport; Sleeves: A.M.G, apă pură

== Phase I ==
=== Group A ===
Pos	Team	Pld	W	D	L	GF	GA	GD	Pts	Qualification
1	Vulturii Cutezători (Q)	14	9	2	3	34	22	+12	29	Phase II Group 1
2	Iskra Rîbnița (Q)	14	9	1	4	28	14	+14	28	Phase II Group 1
3	Zimbru-2 Chișinău (Note: Ineligible for Phase II Group 1) (Q)	14	6	1	7	26	27	−1	19	Phase II Group 2
4	FCM Ungheni (Q)	14	5	4	5	36	30	+6	19	Phase II Group 2
5	Univer Comrat (Q)	14	5	3	6	27	27	0	18	Phase II Group 2
6	Spartanii Sportul (Q)	14	1	3	10	19	50	−31	6	Phase II Group 2

Updated to match(es) played on 20 November 2026. Source: FMF, Soccerway
Rules for classification: 1) Points; 2) Head-to-head points; 3) Head-to-head goal difference; 4) Head-to-head goals scored; 5) Matches won; 6) Goal difference; 7) Goals scored; 8) Least red cards; 9) Least yellow cards.
(Q) Qualified for the phase indicated

=== Results ===
Matches 1−15
Home \ Away	ISK	SPA	UNG	UNI	VUL	ZIM	ISK	SPA	UNG	UNI	VUL	ZIM
Iskra Rîbnița	—	10–0	2–2	1–0	1–3	2–0	—	1–0	—	—	0–2	—
Spartanii Sportul	1–0	—	1–1	1–6	1–2	3–4	—	—	2–2	27 Nov	—	—
FCM Ungheni	2–3	5–2	—	6–2	1–3	1–2	27 Nov	—	—	1–3	6–1	—
Univer Comrat	0–2	5–4	1–1	—	3–3	4–2	0–1	—	—	—	0–1	2–1
Vulturii Cutezători	2–1	6–2	3–4	2–0	—	5–1	—	1–1	—	—	—	27 Nov
Zimbru-2 Chișinău	1–2	4–0	1–3	1–1	1–0	—	1–2	3–1	4–1	—	—	—

Updated to match(es) played on 20 November 2026. Source: FMF (in Romanian)
Legend: Blue = home team win; Yellow = draw; Red = away team win.

=== Group B ===
Pos	Team	Pld	W	D	L	GF	GA	GD	Pts	Qualification
1	Oguz Comrat (Q)	12	7	3	2	16	10	+6	24	Phase II Group 1
2	Stăuceni	11	5	3	3	18	13	+5	18	Phase II Group 1
3	Fălești	11	4	3	4	15	16	−1	15	Phase II Group 2
4	Național Ialoveni (Q)	11	4	2	5	15	14	+1	14	Phase II Group 2
5	Victoria Ialoveni (Q)	11	2	1	8	11	22	−11	7	Phase II Group 2

Updated to match(es) played on 21 November 2026. Source: FMF, Soccerway
Rules for classification: 1) Points; 2) Head-to-head points; 3) Head-to-head goal difference; 4) Head-to-head goals scored; 5) Matches won; 6) Goal difference; 7) Goals scored; 8) Least red cards; 9) Least yellow cards.
(Q) Qualified for the phase indicated

=== Results ===
Matches 1−12
Home \ Away	FĂL	NAȚ	OGU	STĂ	VIC	FĂL	NAȚ	OGU	STĂ	VIC
Fălești	—	3–1	0–2	1–2	1–0	—	—	—	27 Nov	4–3
Național Ialoveni	0–1	—	0–2	1–0	2–1	3–3	—	4–0	—	—
Oguz Comrat	0–0	2–1	—	2–2	1–1	2–0	—	—	—	—
Stăuceni	1–1	1–1	1–0	—	4–1	—	1–0	1–3	—	—
Victoria Ialoveni	2–1	0–2	0–1	3–2	—	—	27 Nov	0–1	0–3	—

Updated to match(es) played on 21 November 2026. Source: FMF (in Romanian)
Legend: Blue = home team win; Yellow = draw; Red = away team win.
