= 2024–25 Moldovan Liga 1 =

Moldovan football's second-tier league

Liga 1
- Season: 2024–25
- Dates: 9 August 2024 – 10 May 2025
- Champions: Dacia Buiucani
- Promoted: Dacia Buiucani; Saksan
- Relegated: Speranța Drochia; Vulturii Cutezători

The 2024–25 Moldovan Liga 1 was the 34th season of Moldovan football's second-tier league. The season started on 9 August 2024 and concluded on 10 May 2025, with play-off matches played between 7 and 28 May for a place in Moldovan Liga next season.

== Teams ==
Location of teams in 2024–25 Liga 1

Club	Location	Ground
Fălești	Fălești	Fălești Stadium
Iskra	Rîbnița	Rîbnița Stadium
Olimp	Comrat	Comrat Stadium
Saksan	Ceadîr-Lunga	Joma Arena (Chișinău)
Sheriff-2	Tiraspol	Sheriff Indoor Arena
Speranis	Nisporeni	Mircea Eliade
Speranța	Drochia	Drochia Stadium
Stăuceni	Stăuceni	Olimp Stadium
FCM Ungheni	Ungheni	Mircea Eliade (Nisporeni)
Univer	Comrat	Comrat Stadium
Victoria	Chișinău	Joma Arena
Vulturii Cutezători	Sîngerei	Sîngerei Stadium
2 relegated teams from 2024–25 Moldovan Super Liga
Dacia Buiucani	Chișinău	Joma Arena
Florești	Florești	Bender Stadium (Bender)

== Phase I ==
=== Group A ===
Pos	Team	Pld	W	D	L	GF	GA	GD	Pts	Qualification
1	Sheriff-2 Tiraspol (Note: Ineligible for Phase II Group 1)	15	14	1	0	43	8	+35	43	Phase II Group 2
2	Saksan	15	8	4	3	31	18	+13	28	Phase II Group 1
3	Fălești	15	7	0	8	21	31	−10	21	Phase II Group 1
4	Univer Comrat	15	4	3	8	21	27	−6	15	Phase II Group 2
5	Speranis Nisporeni	15	3	3	9	17	22	−5	12	Phase II Group 2
6	Vulturii Cutezători	15	3	1	11	19	46	−27	10	Phase II Group 2

Source: FMF, Soccerway
Rules for classification: 1) Points; 2) Head-to-head points; 3) Head-to-head goal difference; 4) Head-to-head goals scored; 5) Matches won; 6) Goal difference; 7) Goals scored; 8) Least red cards; 9) Least yellow cards.

=== Results ===
Home \ Away	FĂL	SAK	SHE	SPE	UNI	VUL	FĂL	SAK	SHE	SPE	UNI	VUL
Fălești	—	0–2	0–3	3–0	3–1	3–2	—	—	0–3	—	—	1–4
Saksan	0–2	—	1–2	2–1	1–1	4–0	4–0	—	—	—	2–1	2–0
Sheriff-2 Tiraspol	2–0	5–2	—	1–0	2–1	9–1	—	1–1	—	2–0	4–0	—
Speranis Nisporeni	1–2	1–1	1–2	—	3–0	4–0	2–3	1–2	—	—	—	—
Univer Comrat	2–0	2–2	0–1	1–1	—	3–1	2–0	—	—	3–1	—	—
Vulturii Cutezători	3–4	1–5	1–4	0–1	2–1	—	—	—	0–2	0–0	4–3	—

Source: FMF (in Romanian)
Legend: Blue = home team win; Yellow = draw; Red = away team win.

=== Group B ===
Pos	Team	Pld	W	D	L	GF	GA	GD	Pts	Qualification
1	Victoria Chișinău	15	11	1	3	51	21	+30	34	Phase II Group 1
2	Stăuceni	15	8	2	5	35	25	+10	26	Phase II Group 1
3	FCM Ungheni	15	7	1	7	33	35	−2	22	Phase II Group 2
4	Iskra Rîbnița	15	6	2	7	26	33	−7	20	Phase II Group 2
5	Olimp Comrat	15	4	4	7	26	42	−16	16	Phase II Group 2
6	Speranța Drochia	15	3	2	10	27	42	−15	11	Phase II Group 2

Source: FMF, Soccerway
Rules for classification: 1) Points; 2) Head-to-head points; 3) Head-to-head goal difference; 4) Head-to-head goals scored; 5) Matches won; 6) Goal difference; 7) Goals scored; 8) Least red cards; 9) Least yellow cards.

=== Results ===
Home \ Away	ISK	OLI	SPE	STĂ	UNG	VIC	ISK	OLI	SPE	STĂ	UNG	VIC
Iskra Rîbnița	—	3–1	0–5	2–0	1–1	1–3	—	—	3–1	—	2–3	1–0
Olimp Comrat	1–0	—	1–1	2–2	0–3	0–4	1–2	—	—	—	4–1	2–2
Speranța Drochia	1–3	1–2	—	4–2	1–0	1–4	—	6–6	—	0–2	2–3	—
Stăuceni	3–1	6–2	2–0	—	2–4	0–3	1–1	6–1	—	—	—	—
FCM Ungheni	4–3	1–3	2–1	4–2	—	3–4	—	—	—	0–4	—	2–3
Victoria Chișinău	8–3	4–0	4–1	0–1	3–2	—	—	—	8–2	1–2	—	—

Source: FMF (in Romanian)
Legend: Blue = home team win; Yellow = draw; Red = away team win.

== Phase II ==
=== Group 1 ===
Pos	Team	Pld	W	D	L	GF	GA	GD	Pts	Promotion or qualification	DAC	SAK	STĂ	VIC	FĂL	FLO
1	Dacia Buiucani (C, P)	10	9	1	0	38	3	+35	28	Promotion to Liga		3–0	1–0	4–0	6–0	4–0
2	Saksan (Note: Saksan became Politehnica UTM before the start of the next season.) (O, P)	10	7	2	1	38	8	+30	23	Play-offs	2–2		3–1	2–0	2–0	19–0
3	Stăuceni	10	6	1	3	17	14	+3	19	Play-offs	0–6	1–1		3–1	2–1	3–1
4	Victoria Chișinău	10	4	0	6	21	20	+1	12	Play-offs	1–5	1–3	0–1		5–1	4–1
5	Fălești	10	2	0	8	12	30	−18	6	Play-offs	0–4	0–3	0–3	0–4		1–0
6	Florești	10	0	0	10	3	54	−51	−3 (Note: Florești had 3 points deducted for using players in a home match against Fălești, who played the same day for the junior team.)	Play-offs	0–3	0–3	0–3	0–5	1–9	

Source: FMF, Soccerway
Legend: Blue = home team win; Yellow = draw; Red = away team win.
Rules for classification: 1) Points; 2) Head-to-head points; 3) Head-to-head goal difference; 4) Head-to-head goals scored; 5) Matches won; 6) Goal difference; 7) Goals scored; 8) Least red cards; 9) Least yellow cards.
(C) Champions; (O) Play-off winners; (P) Promoted

=== Group 2 ===
Pos	Team	Pld	W	D	L	GF	GA	GD	Pts	Qualification or relegation	SHE	NIS	UNI	ISK	OLI	UNG	DRO	VUL
1	Sheriff-2 Tiraspol (Note: Ineligible for play-offs and relegation)	7	5	1	1	22	5	+17	16			—	—	1–0	—	5–2	5–0	—
2	Speranis Nisporeni (Note: Speranis Nisporeni merged into Oguz Comrat before the start of the next season.)	7	4	2	1	12	6	+6	14	Play-offs	1–0		—	—	5–2	—	2–1	—
3	Univer Comrat	7	3	4	0	8	5	+3	13	Play-offs	1–1	1–0		—	—	0–0	2–1	—
4	Iskra Rîbnița	7	2	4	1	8	7	+1	10	Play-offs	—	1–1	0–0		3–2	—	—	1–0
5	Olimp Comrat	7	3	0	4	15	22	−7	9 (Note: Head-to-head points: Olimp : 3, FCM Ungheni : 0.)	Play-offs	1–7	—	2–3	—		—	—	2–1
6	FCM Ungheni	7	2	3	2	14	14	0	9	Play-offs	—	1–1	—	2–2	2–4		—	4–2
7	Speranța Drochia (R)	7	1	1	5	5	15	−10	4	Liga 2	—	—	—	1–1	1–2	0–3 (Note: The match was not played. Speranța as home team, was not able to provide ambulance services at the stadium. Awarded a 3–0 technical victory to FCM Ungheni.)		—
8	Vulturii Cutezători (R)	7	0	1	6	4	14	−10	1	Liga 2	0–3	0–2	1–1	—	—	—	0–1	

Source: FMF, Soccerway
Legend: Blue = home team win; Yellow = draw; Red = away team win.
Rules for classification: 1) Points; 2) Head-to-head points; 3) Head-to-head goal difference; 4) Head-to-head goals scored; 5) Matches won; 6) Goal difference; 7) Goals scored; 8) Least red cards; 9) Least yellow cards.
(R) Relegated

== Promotion play-offs ==
=== Bracket ===
First round
7 May 2025
Univer Comrat	2
Iskra Rîbnița (a.e.t.)	3
7 May 2025
Speranis Nisporeni	3
Olimp Comrat	1

Second round
16 May 2025
Saksan	4
Iskra Rîbnița	0
17 May 2025
Fălești (a.e.t.)	2
Florești	0
17 May 2025
Victoria Chișinău	3
FCM Ungheni	1
17 May 2025
Stăuceni	0
Speranis Nisporeni	1

Third round
21 May 2025
Saksan	2
Fălești	0
21 May 2025
Victoria Chișinău	0
Speranis Nisporeni	2

Fourth round
28 May 2025
Saksan	4
Speranis Nisporeni	0

=== First round ===
7 May 2025	Speranis Nisporeni	3–1	Olimp Comrat	Nisporeni
16:00 EEST	Castro 13' (o.g.); Danilov 33', 54' (pen.)		Holodnic 45'	Stadium: Mircea Eliade; Attendance: 50; Referee: Pavel Mura

7 May 2025	Univer Comrat	2–3 (a.e.t.)	Iskra Rîbnița	Comrat
17:00 EEST	Bargan 7'; Gheorghiev 89'		A. Popovici 15', 48'; Pătraș 110'	Stadium: Victor Mumjiev; Attendance: 100; Referee: Stanislav Leu

=== Second round ===
16 May 2025	Saksan	4–0	Iskra Rîbnița	Chișinău
16:00 EEST	Musteață 45+1', 73'; Cucer 89'; Țelic 90+2'	Report		Stadium: Joma Arena; Attendance: 100; Referee: Oleg Stoianov

17 May 2025	Fălești	2–0 (a.e.t.)	Florești	Fălești
16:00 EEST	Tonofrei 109'; Beșeti 113' (pen.)	Report		Stadium: Fălești Stadium; Attendance: 150; Referee: Ion Bodean

17 May 2025	Victoria Chișinău	3–1	FCM Ungheni	Chișinău
16:00 EEST	Gurgurov 45', 85'; Bejan 47'	Report	Bilinschii 61'	Stadium: Joma Arena; Attendance: 150; Referee: Gheorghe Dandeș

17 May 2025	Stăuceni	0–1	Speranis Nisporeni	Stăuceni
16:00 EEST		Report	Maneacov 30' (pen.)	Stadium: Olimp Stadium; Attendance: 200; Referee: Nicolae Bălțătescu

=== Third round ===
21 May 2025	Saksan	2–0	Fălești	Cricova
17:00 EEST	Lipcan 12'; Musteață 35'			Stadium: Cricova Stadium; Attendance: 50; Referee: Mihail Borisov

21 May 2025	Victoria Chișinău	0–2	Speranis Nisporeni	Chișinău
17:00 EEST			Rusu 3'; Bujor 55'	Stadium: Joma Arena; Attendance: 100; Referee: Petru Ciorbă

=== Fourth round ===
28 May 2025	Saksan	4–0	Speranis Nisporeni	Chișinău
17:00 EEST	Mardari 2' (pen.); Musteață 39', 51'; Șilcenco 90+2'	Report		Stadium: Joma Arena; Attendance: 150; Referee: Ion Tudos

== Top goalscorers ==
Rank	Player	Club	Goals
1	(Moldova) Bogdan Musteață	Saksan	23
2	(Moldova) Nicolae Țelic	Saksan	19
3	(Moldova) Serghei Decev	Olimp	18
4	(Moldova) Daniel Dosca	Stăuceni	17
5	(Moldova) Valeriu Gurgurov	Victoria	14
5	(Moldova) Maxim Danilov	Speranis	14
7	(Moldova) Nicolai Spatar	Sheriff-2	13
8	(Moldova) Vladislav Cozma	Sheriff-2	12
8	(Moldova) Alexandru Popovici	Iskra (7) & Olimp (5)	12
10	(Moldova) Daniel Muntean	Iskra	11

== Clean sheets ==
Rank	Player	Club	Clean sheets
1	(Moldova) Roman Dumenco	Sheriff-2	9
2	(Moldova) Pavel Socolov	Saksan	8
3	(Moldova) Vladislav Butuc	Stăuceni	6
4	(Moldova) Nicolae Garanovschi	Speranis (3) & Vulturii (1)	4
4	(Moldova) Eduard Valuța	Victoria	4
4	(Moldova) Victor Buga	Fălești	4
4	(Moldova) Alessandro Burov	Dacia Buiucani	4
4	(Moldova) Bogdan Suruceanu	Dacia Buiucani	4
4	(Moldova) Cristian Leu	Saksan	4
10	(Moldova) Anton Coval	Univer	3
10	(Moldova) Anatolie Cebotari	Iskra	3

=== Discipline ===
==== Club ====
- Most yellow cards: 61
  - Univer
- Fewest yellow cards: 12
  - Florești
- Most red cards: 7
  - Speranța
- Fewest red cards: 0
  - Saksan
  - Iskra
  - Dacia Buiucani
