= List of football clubs in Moldova =

This is a list of football clubs in the Moldova. The list only includes clubs that currently play in the Moldovan league system. The list is updated as of the 2025–26 season.

== Liga ==
- Bălți
- Dacia Buiucani
- Milsami Orhei
- Petrocub Hîncești
- Politehnica UTM Chișinău
- Sheriff Tiraspol
- Spartanii Sportul
- Zimbru Chișinău

== Liga 1 ==
- Fălești
- Florești
- Iskra Rîbnița
- Oguzsport Comrat
- Olimp Comrat
- Real Sireți
- Sheriff-2 Tiraspol
- Stăuceni
- FCM Ungheni
- Univer Comrat
- Victoria Chișinău
- Zimbru-2 Chișinău

== Liga 2 ==
=== North ===
- Atletico Bălți
- Edineț
- EFA Visoca
- Grănicerul Glodeni
- Locomotiva Ocnița
- Olimpia Bălți
- Speranța Drochia
- Steaua Nordului
- Țarigrad
- Vulturii Cutezători

=== South ===
- Atletic Strășeni
- Cahul
- Chișinău
- Congaz
- Constructorul Leova
- FCM Ungheni-2
- Maiak Chirsova
- Național Ialoveni
- Real Succes Chișinău
- Socol Copceac
