= 2025–26 Moldovan Liga 1 =

Moldovan football's second-tier league

Liga 1
- Season: 2025–26
- Dates: 25 July 2025 – 9 May 2026
- Champions: Politehnica UTM
- Promoted: Politehnica UTM; Real Sireți
- Relegated: Olimp Comrat; Sheriff-2 Tiraspol

The 2025–26 Moldovan Liga 1 was the 35th season of Moldovan football's second-tier league. The season started on 25 July 2025 and concluded on 9 May 2026, with play-off matches played between 6 and 27 May for a place in Moldovan Liga next season.

== Teams ==
Location of teams in 2025–26 Liga 1

Club	Location	Ground
Fălești	Fălești	Fălești Stadium
Florești	Florești	Dinamo Stadium (Bender)
Iskra	Rîbnița	Rîbnița Stadium
Oguz	Comrat	Victor Mumjiev
Olimp	Comrat	Victor Mumjiev
Real	Sireți	Sireți Stadium
Sheriff-2	Tiraspol	Sheriff training field
Stăuceni	Stăuceni	Olimp Stadium
FCM Ungheni	Ungheni	Ungheni Stadium
Univer	Comrat	Victor Mumjiev
Victoria	Chișinău	Joma Arena
Zimbru-2	Chișinău	Zimbru-2 Stadium
2 relegated teams from 2025–26 Moldovan Liga
Politehnica UTM	Chișinău	Joma Arena
Spartanii Sportul	Selemet	Nisporeni Stadium (Nisporeni)

== Phase I ==
=== Group A ===
Pos	Team	Pld	W	D	L	GF	GA	GD	Pts	Qualification
1	Stăuceni	15	12	2	1	45	15	+30	38	Phase II Group 1
2	Real Sireți	15	11	2	2	52	20	+32	35	Phase II Group 1
3	Univer Comrat	15	9	0	6	33	25	+8	27	Phase II Group 2
4	Sheriff-2 Tiraspol (Note: Ineligible for Phase II Group 1)	15	4	3	8	18	27	−9	15	Phase II Group 2
5	Olimp Comrat	15	3	1	11	17	44	−27	10	Phase II Group 2
6	Fălești	15	1	2	12	15	49	−34	5	Phase II Group 2

Source: FMF, Soccerway
Rules for classification: 1) Points; 2) Head-to-head points; 3) Head-to-head goal difference; 4) Head-to-head goals scored; 5) Matches won; 6) Goal difference; 7) Goals scored; 8) Least red cards; 9) Least yellow cards.

=== Results ===
Matches 1−15
Home \ Away	FĂL	OLI	REA	SHE	STĂ	UNI	FĂL	OLI	REA	SHE	STĂ	UNI
Fălești	—	0–1	2–2	0–0	0–2	0–6	—	—	1–5	—	3–7	0–2
Olimp Comrat	1–0	—	1–4	0–1	0–1	1–2	2–3	—	—	1–1	—	—
Real Sireți	5–1	5–4	—	2–0	0–0	4–1	—	9–1	—	—	4–1	—
Sheriff-2 Tiraspol	4–2	0–1	1–4	—	0–0	3–2	4–1	—	1–3	—	1–2	—
Stăuceni	4–0	6–0	3–1	4–1	—	2–0	—	6–3	—	—	—	4–1
Univer Comrat	4–2	2–0	2–0	3–0	1–3	—	—	4–1	1–4	2–1	—	—

Source: FMF (in Romanian)
Legend: Blue = home team win; Yellow = draw; Red = away team win.

=== Group B ===
Pos	Team	Pld	W	D	L	GF	GA	GD	Pts	Qualification
1	Florești	15	9	4	2	43	13	+30	31	Phase II Group 1
2	Zimbru-2 Chișinău (Note: Ineligible for Phase II Group 1)	15	8	3	4	30	25	+5	27 (Note: Head-to-head points: Zimbru-2 : 7, Iskra : 1.)	Phase II Group 2
3	Iskra Rîbnița	15	8	3	4	29	29	0	27	Phase II Group 1
4	FCM Ungheni	15	7	3	5	30	22	+8	24	Phase II Group 2
5	Oguz Comrat	15	2	4	9	17	28	−11	10	Phase II Group 2
6	Victoria Chișinău	15	2	1	12	17	49	−32	7	Phase II Group 2

Source: FMF, Soccerway
Rules for classification: 1) Points; 2) Head-to-head points; 3) Head-to-head goal difference; 4) Head-to-head goals scored; 5) Matches won; 6) Goal difference; 7) Goals scored; 8) Least red cards; 9) Least yellow cards.

=== Results ===
Matches 1−15
Home \ Away	FLO	ISK	OGU	UNG	VIC	ZIM	FLO	ISK	OGU	UNG	VIC	ZIM
Florești	—	1–2	1–1	1–0	5–1	4–0	—	1–1	—	—	7–0	3–0
Iskra Rîbnița	1–8	—	2–2	2–1	1–0	2–3	—	—	1–0	1–0	4–1	—
Oguz Comrat	1–3	0–2	—	2–2	3–0	1–2	1–0	—	—	—	1–2	1–3
FCM Ungheni	2–3	3–1	3–1	—	3–1	3–3	1–1	—	3–0	—	—	—
Victoria Chișinău	2–5	2–6	2–2	2–3	—	2–1	—	—	—	1–2	—	0–3
Zimbru-2 Chișinău	0–0	2–2	2–1	3–2	3–1	—	—	5–1	—	0–2	—	—

Source: FMF (in Romanian)
Legend: Blue = home team win; Yellow = draw; Red = away team win.

== Phase II ==
=== Group 1 ===
Pos	Team	Pld	W	D	L	GF	GA	GD	Pts	Promotion or qualification	POL	REA	SPA	FLO	ISK	STĂ
1	Politehnica UTM (C, P)	10	6	4	0	20	7	+13	22	Promotion to Liga		3–1	2–0	2–0	2–1	5–1
2	Real Sireți (O, P)	10	5	2	3	16	12	+4	17	Play-offs	1–1		0–1	1–0	4–0	4–3
3	Spartanii Sportul	10	4	3	3	15	14	+1	15	Play-offs	1–1	0–2		2–2	0–2	5–2
4	Florești (Note: Florești completed the season but withdrew from the league prior to the start of the next season.)	10	2	4	4	9	12	−3	10 (Note: Head-to-head points: Florești : 4, Iskra : 1.)	Play-offs	1–1	0–2	1–2		3–1	1–0
5	Iskra Rîbnița	10	2	4	4	9	13	−4	10	Play-offs	0–2	3–0	1–1	1–1		0–0
6	Stăuceni	10	0	5	5	9	20	−11	5	Play-offs	1–1	1–1	1–3	0–0	0–0	

Source: FMF, Soccerway
Legend: Blue = home team win; Yellow = draw; Red = away team win.
Rules for classification: 1) Points; 2) Head-to-head points; 3) Head-to-head goal difference; 4) Head-to-head goals scored; 5) Matches won; 6) Goal difference; 7) Goals scored; 8) Least red cards; 9) Least yellow cards.
(C) Champions; (O) Play-off winners; (P) Promoted

=== Group 2 ===
Pos	Team	Pld	W	D	L	GF	GA	GD	Pts	Qualification or relegation	UNG	FĂL	UNI	OGU	ZIM	VIC	OLI	SHE
1	FCM Ungheni	7	5	0	2	24	13	+11	15	Play-offs		—	—	—	5–1	6–2	—	4–0
2	Fălești	7	4	1	2	12	8	+4	13	Play-offs	1–2		1–3	—	—	—	4–0	2–1
3	Univer Comrat	7	3	2	2	11	12	−1	11	Play-offs	4–3	—		—	0–4	—	0–2	1–1
4	Oguz Comrat	7	2	3	2	7	8	−1	9 (Note: Head-to-head points: Oguz : 3, Zimbru-2 : 0.)	Play-offs	2–4	1–1	0–2		—	—	—	—
5	Zimbru-2 Chișinău (Note: Ineligible for play-offs and relegation)	7	3	0	4	11	10	+1	9		—	0–1	—	0–1		1–2	4–1	—
6	Victoria Chișinău	7	2	2	3	10	15	−5	8 (Note: Head-to-head points: Victoria : 3, Olimp : 0.)	Play-offs	—	1–2	1–1	0–0	—		—	—
7	Olimp Comrat (R)	7	2	2	3	12	15	−3	8	Relegation to Liga 2	3–0 (Note: FCM Ungheni did not use at least two players under the age of 21 for the entire duration of the game, as required by the regulation, and received a 0–3 technical loss. The original match ended in a 3–2 victory for FCM Ungheni.)	—	—	1–1	—	3–4		—
8	Sheriff-2 Tiraspol (Note: Ineligible for play-offs) (R)	7	1	2	4	6	12	−6	5	Relegation to Liga 2	—	—	—	0–2	0–1	2–0	2–2	

Source: FMF, Soccerway
Legend: Blue = home team win; Yellow = draw; Red = away team win.
Rules for classification: 1) Points; 2) Head-to-head points; 3) Head-to-head goal difference; 4) Head-to-head goals scored; 5) Matches won; 6) Goal difference; 7) Goals scored; 8) Least red cards; 9) Least yellow cards.
(R) Relegated

== Promotion play-offs ==
=== Bracket ===
First round
6 May 2026
Univer Comrat	2
Oguz Comrat	3
6 May 2026
FCM Ungheni (a.e.t.)	4
Victoria Chișinău	2

Second round
16 May 2026
Real Sireți	5
Oguz Comrat	2
16 May 2026
Iskra Rîbnița	3
Stăuceni	1
16 May 2026
Spartanii Sportul	3
Fălești	0
16 May 2026
Florești	5
FCM Ungheni	4

Third round
20 May 2026
Real Sireți	1
Iskra Rîbnița	0
20 May 2026
Spartanii Sportul	1
Florești	4

Fourth round
27 May 2026
Real Sireți (a.e.t.)	1
Florești	0

=== First round ===
6 May 2026	Univer Comrat	2–3	Oguz Comrat	Comrat
16:00 EEST	Botnarenco 80'; Cara 90+3'	Report	Gheorghiev 5'; Platovschi 48'; Cedîrean 73'	Stadium: Victor Mumjiev; Attendance: 150; Referee: Gheorghe Dandeș

6 May 2026	FCM Ungheni	4–2 (a.e.t.)	Victoria Chișinău	Ungheni
16:00 EEST	Gurulea 30', 113'; Maneacov 106'; Stratan 120'	Report	Pavlov 17' (pen.), 116'	Stadium: Ungheni Stadium; Attendance: 100; Referee: Grigore Ciugui

=== Second round ===
16 May 2026	Real Sireți	5–2	Oguz Comrat	Sireți
16:00 EEST	Molla 23'; Stan 37'; Gulceac 42'; Borovschi 44'; Orbu 89'	Report	Cedîrean 18'; Rebeja 75' (o.g.)	Stadium: Sireți Stadium; Attendance: 300; Referee: Ivan Tudos

16 May 2026	Iskra Rîbnița	3–1	Stăuceni	Rîbnița
16:00 EEST	Lacerda 20'; Gliga 29'; Muntean 85'	Report	Țelic 46'	Stadium: Rîbnița Stadium; Attendance: 100; Referee: Andrei Breguța

16 May 2026	Florești	5–4	FCM Ungheni	Bender
16:00 EEST	Solodovnicov 50', 55', 57', 65', 90'	Report	Lebădă 20'; Cojocaru 25', 45+1', 85' (pen.)	Stadium: Bender Stadium; Attendance: 200; Referee: Vladimir Mortean

16 May 2026	Spartanii Sportul	3–0	Fălești	Nisporeni
20:00 EEST	Păscăluță 39', 89'; Muntean 69'	Report		Stadium: Nisporeni Stadium; Attendance: 200; Referee: Andrei Diordiev

=== Third round ===
20 May 2026	Real Sireți	1–0	Iskra Rîbnița	Sireți
17:00 EEST	Dodon 7'	Report		Stadium: Sireți Stadium; Attendance: 400; Referee: Andrei Cojocaru

20 May 2026	Spartanii Sportul	1–4	Florești	Nisporeni
17:00 EEST	Păscăluță 59' (pen.)	Report	Ignatov 9'; Litveacov 47', 76'; Blajchin 82'	Stadium: Nisporeni Stadium; Attendance: 50; Referee: Oleg Stoianov

=== Fourth round ===
27 May 2026	Real Sireți	1–0 (a.e.t.)	Florești	Sireți
17:00 EEST	Roizman 103'	Report		Stadium: Sireți Stadium; Attendance: 400; Referee: Roman Jitari

== Top goalscorers ==
Rank	Player	Club	Goals
1	(Moldova) Andrei Stratan	FCM Ungheni	17
1	(Moldova) Nicolae Țelic	Stăuceni	17
3	(Moldova) Eugen Sidorenco	FCM Ungheni (6) & Florești (10)	16
3	(Moldova) Eugeniu Borovschi	Real Sireți	16
5	(Moldova) Oleg Molla	Real Sireți	13
6	(Moldova) Florin Cojocaru	FCM Ungheni	12
7	(Moldova) Ion Pavlov	Victoria	11
7	(Moldova) Ghenadie Orbu	Real Sireți	11
7	(Moldova) Daniel Dosca	Stăuceni	11
10	(Moldova) Nicolai Solodovnicov	Florești	10
10	(Moldova) Denis Gușpit	Florești	10

== Clean sheets ==
Rank	Player	Club	Clean sheets
1	(Moldova) Vladislav Butuc	Stăuceni	9
2	(Moldova) Maxim Bardîș	Florești	7
3	(Moldova) Anton Coval	Univer	5
4	(Moldova) Ivan Marcov	Victoria (1) & Olimp (3)	4
4	(Moldova) Roman Grygoryan	Iskra	4
4	(Moldova) Sebastian Agachi	Real Sireți	4
7	(Moldova) Serghei Obîscalov	Sheriff-2	3
7	(Moldova) Alexandros Targon	Iskra	3
7	(Moldova) Victor Buga	Fălești	3
7	(Moldova) Dan Rusu	Zimbru-2	3
7	(Moldova) Alexei Samoilenco	Oguz	3
7	(Moldova) Pavel Socolov	Politehnica UTM	3
7	(Moldova) Adrian Munteanu	Real Sireți	3
