= 2022–23 Moldovan Liga 2 =

Liga 2
- Season: 2022–23
- Dates: 13 August 2022 – 27 May 2023

The 2022–23 Moldovan Liga 2 was the 32nd season of Moldovan football's third-tier league. The season started on 13 August 2022 and ended on 27 May 2023. The league consisted of two regional groups, Nord (North) and Sud (South).

== North ==
Pos	Team	Pld	W	D	L	GF	GA	GD	Pts	Promotion or relegation
1	Iskra Rîbnița (C, P)	24	18	3	3	57	21	+36	57	Promotion to Liga 1
2	Inter Soroca	24	13	4	7	54	37	+17	43	
3	Pepeni	24	12	6	6	41	27	+14	42 (Note: Pepeni ahead of Locomotiva on head-to-head points: Pepeni : 4, Locomotiva : 1.)	
4	Locomotiva Ocnița	24	13	3	8	39	23	+16	42	
5	Sîngerei	24	12	4	8	48	40	+8	40	withdrew (Note: Sîngerei completed the season but withdrew from the league prior to the start of the next season.)
6	Edineț	24	10	9	5	34	28	+6	39 (Note: Edineț ahead of Vulturii on head-to-head points: Edineț : 4, Vulturii : 1.)	
7	Vulturii Cutezători	24	11	6	7	42	28	+14	39	
8	Țarigrad	24	11	2	11	37	40	−3	35	
9	Olimpia Bălți	24	9	5	10	56	51	+5	32	
10	EFA Visoca	24	9	3	12	38	39	−1	30	
11	FC Visoca	24	6	5	13	23	44	−21	23	
12	Grănicerul Glodeni	24	3	5	16	22	54	−32	14	
13	Rîșcani (Note: Rîșcani avoided relegation due to lack of teams.)	24	1	1	22	27	86	−59	4	

Source: FMF, Soccerway
Rules for classification: 1) Points; 2) Head-to-head points; 3) Head-to-head goal difference; 4) Head-to-head away goals scored; 5) Head-to-head goals scored; 6) Matches won; 7) Goal difference; 8) Goals scored; 9) Less red cards; 10) Less yellow cards.
(C) Champions; (P) Promoted

=== Results ===
Teams will play each other twice (once home, once away).

Home \ Away	EDI	EFA	GRĂ	INT	ISK	LOC	OLI	PEP	RÎȘ	SÎN	ȚAR	VIS	VUL
Edineț	—	3–1	1–1	3–1	1–1	1–0	2–1	2–2	1–0	1–4	4–0	2–0	1–0
EFA Visoca	0–1	—	1–0	1–1	0–1	0–1	5–4	0–2	5–1	3–1	1–3	1–0	1–1
Grănicerul Glodeni	0–0	1–2	—	0–2	1–5	0–0	3–6	0–1	3–2	2–3	0–0	4–0	0–2
Inter Soroca	0–0	5–2	3–0	—	0–3	1–2	2–2	2–0	5–2	0–2	2–0	3–0	1–0
Iskra Rîbnița	2–0	3–2	4–0	2–0	—	3–0	5–1	0–2	5–1	2–1	2–4	0–0	2–0
Locomotiva Ocnița	3–1	0–2	4–0	2–1	0–1	—	4–0	1–1	4–0	1–1	1–0	1–2	1–2
Olimpia Bălți	3–1	2–2	6–0	1–4	2–2	1–3	—	0–0	3–1	1–0	1–3	1–2	0–0
Pepeni	3–0	2–1	2–2	1–2	0–1	1–0	5–4	—	4–2	0–1	1–2	2–0	1–1
Rîșcani	2–2	0–1	2–5	1–5	1–6	1–5	1–5	0–4	—	2–5	1–2	1–3	3–2
Sîngerei	1–4	3–2	2–0	5–3	0–3	0–1	3–1	0–2	4–2	—	1–0	2–2	4–2
Țarigrad	3–3	3–1	1–0	2–3	0–1	2–3	1–6	1–3	2–0	3–2	—	3–1	1–2
FC Visoca	0–0	0–4	1–0	4–6	1–2	0–2	1–3	0–0	2–0	1–1	1–0	—	0–1
Vulturii Cutezători	0–0	1–0	4–0	2–2	4–1	2–0	1–2	5–2	3–1	2–2	0–1	5–2	—

Updated to match(es) played on completed. Source: FMF (in Romanian)
Legend: Blue = home team win; Yellow = draw; Red = away team win.

== South ==
Pos	Team	Pld	W	D	L	GF	GA	GD	Pts	Promotion or relegation
1	Univer-Oguzsport (C, P)	22	16	5	1	80	17	+63	53 (Note: Univer-Oguzsport ahead of Zimbru-2 on head-to-head points: Univer-Oguzsport : 4, Zimbru-2 : 1.)	Promotion to Liga 1
2	Zimbru-2 Chișinău	22	16	5	1	97	21	+76	53	withdrew (Note: Zimbru-2 Chișinău completed the season but withdrew from the league prior to the start of the next season.)
3	Stăuceni	22	15	4	3	71	25	+46	49	
4	La Familia	22	12	3	7	50	31	+19	39	
5	Cimișlia	22	8	6	8	27	30	−3	30	withdrew (Note: Cimișlia completed the season but withdrew from the league prior to the start of the next season.)
6	Cricova	22	8	5	9	31	34	−3	29	
7	Congaz	22	6	6	10	27	54	−27	24	
8	Atletic Strășeni	22	5	8	9	35	42	−7	23 (Note: Atletic ahead of Slobozia Mare on head-to-head goal difference: Atletic : +8, Slobozia Mare : –8.)	
9	Slobozia Mare	22	7	2	13	25	75	−50	23	
10	Codru Călărași	22	5	7	10	31	44	−13	22	
11	Socol Copceac	22	3	3	16	23	70	−47	12	
12	Maiak Chirsova (Note: Maiak Chirsova avoided relegation due to lack of teams.)	22	3	2	17	21	75	−54	11	

Source: FMF, Soccerway
Rules for classification: 1) Points; 2) Head-to-head points; 3) Head-to-head goal difference; 4) Head-to-head away goals scored; 5) Head-to-head goals scored; 6) Matches won; 7) Goal difference; 8) Goals scored; 9) Less red cards; 10) Less yellow cards.
(C) Champions; (P) Promoted

=== Results ===
Teams will play each other twice (once home, once away).

Home \ Away	ATL	CIM	COD	CON	CRI	MAI	LAF	UNI	SLO	SOC	STĂ	ZIM
Atletic Strășeni	—	1–1	3–2	0–0	1–1	5–2	1–1	2–2	11–2	2–0	1–2	0–2
Cimișlia	0–0	—	2–1	1–1	0–1	4–3	4–0	0–2	0–1	1–0	1–4	2–2
Codru Călărași	1–1	1–1	—	0–0	0–0	4–1	0–1	1–2	3–2	2–0	2–2	2–4
Congaz	2–1	1–2	1–2	—	2–1	3–1	0–5	0–0	1–0	2–1	0–3	0–1
Cricova	2–2	0–1	2–2	1–1	—	3–0	1–0	1–8	7–0	3–0	0–1	0–5
Maiak Chirsova	1–2	0–2	1–0	1–1	1–3	—	0–3	0–5	1–3	3–1	0–3	1–10
La Familia	6–0	1–1	3–2	7–1	2–0	1–0	—	2–0	4–0	3–1	1–1	2–3
Univer-Oguzsport	2–1	1–0	8–1	8–0	5–1	4–0	5–0	—	4–1	9–0	2–2	2–0
Slobozia Mare	1–0	1–0	2–0	2–6	0–1	1–4	3–2	1–5	—	2–2	0–2	0–0
Socol Copceac	2–0	0–1	1–2	4–2	1–3	4–0	0–4	0–0	2–3	—	0–5	2–2
Stăuceni	3–1	4–2	5–1	6–2	1–0	1–1	4–0	2–4	8–0	11–1	—	1–2
Zimbru-2 Chișinău	7–0	5–1	2–2	7–1	1–0	12–0	4–2	2–2	12–0	10–1	4–0	—

Source: FMF (in Romanian)
Legend: Blue = home team win; Yellow = draw; Red = away team win.

== Top goalscorers ==
Rank	Player	Club	Goals
1	(Moldova) Igor Țîgîrlaș	Stăuceni	19
1	(Moldova) Serghei Gheorghiev	Univer-Oguzsport	19
1	(Moldova) Alexandru Popovici	Iskra	19
1	(Moldova) Alexandru Vasilat	Olimpia	19
5	(Moldova) Chirill Bargan	Univer-Oguzsport	18
5	(Moldova) Ion Morari	Pepeni	18
7	(Moldova) Igor Lohov	Vulturii Cutezători	17
8	(Moldova) Serghei Popovici	Edineț	16
9	(Moldova) Maxim Șoimu	Stăuceni	15
9	(Moldova) Eugeniu Borovschi	Univer-Oguzsport	15
