= Moldovan Liga 1 =

Association football league in Moldova

Liga 1
- Organising body: FMF
- Founded: 1992; 34 years ago
- Country: Moldova
- Confederation: UEFA
- Number of clubs: 12
- Level on pyramid: 2
- Promotion to: Liga
- Relegation to: Liga 2
- Domestic cup(s): Cupa Moldovei; Supercupa Moldovei
- Current champions: Politehnica UTM (1st title) (2025–26)
- Most championships: Sheriff-2 Tiraspol (7 titles)
- Broadcaster(s): We Sport TV; Liga TV
- Website: fmf.md
- Current: 2026–27 Moldovan Liga 1

Liga 1 is the second-level division of Moldovan Football league system, The championship is composed of 12 teams and the top two teams are promoted to the Moldovan Liga, while the bottom two teams are relegated to the Moldovan Liga 2.

== Former name ==
- Divizia A – 1992–2022

== Current clubs ==
Location of teams in 2022–23 Divizia A

The following clubs compete in the 2026–27 season of Liga 1.

Club	Location
Fălești	Fălești
Iskra	Rîbnița
Național	Ialoveni
Oguz	Comrat
Spartanii Sportul	Selemet
Stăuceni	Stăuceni
FCM Ungheni	Ungheni
Univer	Comrat
Victoria	Ialoveni
Vulturii Cutezători	Sîngerei
Zimbru-2	Chișinău

== Champions ==
Season	Champions	League Leading Goalscorers
1992	Nistru Otaci	(Moldova) Igor Ursachi (Valeologia Chișinău) (19)
1992–93	Vilia Briceni	(Moldova) Sergiu Varzari (Izvoraș Drăsliceni) (16)
1993–94	MHM 93 Chişinău	(Moldova) Igor Ursachi (MHM-93 Chișinău) (29)
1994–95	Constructorul Chişinău	(Moldova) Gabriel Rotaru (Locomotiva Basarabeasca) (31)
1995–96	Locomotiva Basarabeasca	(Moldova) Alexandru Pocinciuc (Locomotiva Basarabeasca) (31)
1996–97	Moldova-Gaz Chişinău	Dmitrii Koshakov (Moldova-Gaz Chișinău) (23)
1997–98	Sheriff Tiraspol	(Moldova) Veaceslav Untilă (Dumbrava Cojușna) (23)
1998–99	Zimbru-2 Chişinău	(Moldova) Veaceslav Untilă (Dumbrava Cojușna) & (Petrocub Hîncești) (23)
1999–2000	Sheriff-2 Tiraspol	(Moldova) Eduard Blănuță (Petrocub Hîncești) (17)
2000–01	Sheriff-2 Tiraspol	(Ukraine) Andriy Nesteruk (Sheriff-2 Tiraspol) (21)
2001–02	Dacia Chişinău	(Moldova) Alexandru Golban (Dacia Chişinău) (21)
2002–03	Tiligul Tiraspol	(Moldova) Oleg Hromțov (Tiligul Tiraspol) (21)
2003–04	Steaua Chişinău	(Moldova) Gheorghe Boghiu (Olimpia Bălți), (Moldova) Vladimir Șohirev (Steaua Chișinău) & (Moldova) Vladimir Ciubco (Iskra-Stal) (18)
2004–05	Dinamo Bender	(Moldova) Gheorghe Boghiu (Olimpia Bălți) (34)
2005–06	Zimbru-2 Chişinău	(Moldova) Alexandru Gheorghiev (Gagauziya) (21)
2006–07	Zimbru-2 Chişinău	(Moldova) Alexandru Maximov (Rapid Ghidighici) (20)
2007–08	Sheriff-2 Tiraspol	(Moldova) Artur Calinin (Viitorul Orhei) (21)
2008–09	Viitorul Orhei	(Sweden) Sergiu Baran (Podiș Inești) (30)
2009–10	Costuleni	(Moldova) Mihai Cojusea (Lilcora) & (Gagauziya) (33)
2010–11	Locomotiva Bălţi	(Moldova) Maxim Antoniuc (Zimbru-2) (19)
2011–12	Sheriff-2 Tiraspol	(Moldova) Evgeny Dovbyshenko (Speranța Crihana Veche) (23)
2012–13	Veris Drăgănești	(Moldova) Viorel Frunză (Veris Drăgănești) (30)
2013–14	Saxan Ceadîr-Lunga	(Moldova) Alexandru Răilean (Sfîntul Gheorghe Suruceni) (20)
2014–15	Sheriff-2 Tiraspol	(Moldova) Vladimir Ambros (Petrocub) (25)
2015–16	Spicul Chișcăreni	(Moldova) Ghenadie Orbu (Codru Lozova) (22)
2016–17	Sheriff-2 Tiraspol	(Moldova) Artiom Zabun (Victoria Bardar) (21)
2017	Victoria Bardar	(Moldova) Ghenadie Orbu (Victoria Bardar) (19)
2018	Codru Lozova	(Moldova) Ghenadie Orbu (Victoria Bardar) (21)
2019	Florești	(Moldova) Artiom Litviacov (Tighina) (30)
2020–21	Bălți	(Nigeria) Clement Udeh Godday (Sucleia) (25)
2021–22	Sheriff-2 Tiraspol	(Moldova) Nicolai Porojniuc (FCM Ungheni) (12)
2022–23	Dacia Buiucani	(Moldova) Dmitri Maneacov (Fălești), (Moldova) Ghenadie Orbu (Victoria Bardar), (Moldova) Marin Stan (Victoria Bardar) & (Moldova) Roman Șumchin (Spartanii Selemet) (13)
2023–24	Florești	(Moldova) Eugen Sidorenco (FCM Ungheni) (15)
2024–25	Dacia Buiucani	(Moldova) Bogdan Musteață (Saksan) (20)
2025–26	Politehnica UTM	(Moldova) Andrei Stratan (FCM Ungheni) & (Moldova) Nicolae Țelic (FC Stăuceni) (17)

== Performance by club ==
Club	Winners	Winning Years
Sheriff-2 Tiraspol	7	2000, 2001, 2008, 2012, 2015, 2017, 2021–22
Zimbru-2 Chişinău	3	1999, 2006, 2007
Dacia Chișinău / Dacia Buiucani	3	2002, 2022–23, 2024–25
Florești	2	2019, 2023–24
Nistru Otaci	1	1992
Vilia Briceni	1	1993
MHM 93 Chişinău	1	1994
Constructorul Chişinău	1	1995
Locomotiva Basarabeasca	1	1996
Moldova-Gaz Chişinău	1	1997
Sheriff Tiraspol	1	1998
Tiligul-Tiras Tiraspol	1	2003
Steaua Chişinău	1	2004
Dinamo Bender	1	2005
Viitorul Orhei	1	2009
Costuleni	1	2010
Locomotiva Bălţi	1	2011
Veris Drăgănești	1	2013
Saxan Ceadîr-Lunga	1	2014
Spicul Chișcăreni	1	2016
Victoria Bardar	1	2017
Codru Lozova	1	2018
Bălți	1	2020–21
Politehnica UTM	1	2025–26
