= 2021–22 Moldovan "B" Division =

Divizia B
- Season: 2021–22
- Dates: 14 August 2021 – 28 May 2022

The 2021–22 Moldovan "B" Division (Romanian: Divizia B) was the 31st season of Moldovan football's third-tier league. The season started on 14 August 2021 and ended on 28 May 2022. The league consisted of two regional groups, Nord (North) and Sud (South).

== North ==
Pos	Team	Pld	W	D	L	GF	GA	GD	Pts	Promotion or relegation
1	Fălești (C, P)	24	18	4	2	82	29	+53	58	Promotion to Liga 1
2	Sîngerei	24	16	5	3	65	31	+34	53	
3	Edineț	24	16	4	4	46	22	+24	52	
4	Cruiz Plus	24	15	4	5	55	30	+25	49	withdrew (Note: Cruiz Plus completed the season but withdrew from the league prior to the start of the next season.)
5	Inter Soroca	24	11	7	6	52	45	+7	40	
6	EFA Visoca	24	8	9	7	38	36	+2	33	
7	Olimpia Bălți	24	9	3	12	46	52	−6	30	
8	Codru Călărași	24	9	1	14	53	54	−1	28 (Note: Codru ahead of Pepeni on head-to-head goal difference: Codru : +3, Pepeni : –3.)	
9	Pepeni	24	8	4	12	27	44	−17	28	
10	FC Visoca	24	4	6	14	33	49	−16	18 (Note: FC Visoca ahead of Grănicerul on head-to-head points: Visoca : 4, Grănicerul : 1.)	
11	Grănicerul Glodeni	24	4	6	14	23	53	−30	18	
12	ARF Ocnița	24	5	1	18	29	70	−41	16 (Note: Ocnița ahead of Rîșcani on head-to-head points: Ocnița : 6, Rîșcani : 0.)	
13	Rîșcani	24	4	4	16	33	67	−34	16	

Source: FMF, Soccerway
Rules for classification: 1) Points; 2) Head-to-head points; 3) Head-to-head goal difference; 4) Head-to-head away goals scored; 5) Head-to-head goals scored; 6) Matches won; 7) Goal difference; 8) Goals scored; 9) Less red cards; 10) Less yellow cards.
1. Steaua Telenești withdrew from the league after round 7 and their results were annulled.
(C) Champions; (P) Promoted

=== Results ===
Teams will play each other twice (once home, once away).

Home \ Away	COD	CRU	EDI	EFA	FĂL	GRĂ	INT	OCN	OLI	PEP	RÎȘ	SÎN	VIS
Codru Călărași	—	1–2	0–1	3–1	0–1	2–0	1–0	6–2	2–4	5–1	5–1	0–2	4–3
Cruiz Plus	2–0	—	0–2	3–1	3–2	2–0	1–2	4–2	4–0	2–0	7–2	3–0	2–1
Edineț	3–1	4–2	—	1–0	1–2	2–1	3–1	2–1	3–0	2–1	1–1	1–2	2–1
EFA Visoca	3–1	0–0	0–5	—	1–4	2–0	0–1	5–1	1–5	1–1	6–0	1–1	2–0
Fălești	2–1	2–2	2–0	1–1	—	6–0	8–1	6–2	3–2	6–0	4–2	2–2	3–2
Grănicerul Glodeni	1–1	1–1	0–1	1–1	0–4	—	1–3	5–3	2–1	1–1	2–0	2–2	1–1
Inter Soroca	5–3	1–1	1–1	2–2	0–3	3–1	—	4–0	6–2	1–0	1–3	1–4	5–1
ARF Ocnița	1–5	1–4	0–3	0–1	3–5	0–2	0–2	—	2–3	1–0	1–0	0–2	2–2
Olimpia Bălți	5–2	1–2	2–0	1–1	2–2	2–0	1–1	1–2	—	3–1	0–1	1–4	3–1
Pepeni	3–2	1–0	0–2	2–2	1–6	3–0	2–4	1–0	1–0	—	0–0	3–2	0–1
Rîșcani	5–3	1–3	1–3	2–3	0–3	4–0	4–4	2–3	1–3	0–3	—	1–4	1–5
Sîngerei	5–2	4–2	1–1	1–3	3–1	4–1	2–2	4–0	8–3	2–0	2–0	—	3–1
FC Visoca	1–3	1–3	2–2	0–0	0–4	4–1	1–1	1–2	2–1	1–2	1–1	0–1	—

Source: FMF (in Romanian)
Legend: Blue = home team win; Yellow = draw; Red = away team win.

== South ==
Pos	Team	Pld	W	D	L	GF	GA	GD	Pts	Promotion or relegation
1	Văsieni (C, P)	22	17	2	3	73	20	+53	53	Promotion to Liga 1
2	Stăuceni	22	17	1	4	62	19	+43	52	
3	Cricova	22	12	5	5	46	25	+21	41	
4	Slobozia Mare	22	11	4	7	54	37	+17	37	
5	Atletic Strășeni	22	10	5	7	54	33	+21	35	
6	Oguzsport Comrat	22	10	4	8	49	43	+6	34 (Note: Oguzsport ahead of Cimișlia on head-to-head goal difference: Oguzsport : +1, Cimișlia : –1.)	
7	Cimișlia	22	10	4	8	53	37	+16	34	
8	Saksan	22	10	3	9	50	45	+5	33	withdrew (Note: Saksan completed the season but withdrew from the league prior to the start of the next season.)
9	Congaz	22	9	1	12	37	45	−8	28	
10	Maiak Chirsova	22	4	4	14	40	67	−27	16	
11	Socol Copceac	22	4	3	15	23	57	−34	15	
12	Dinamo Plus	22	0	0	22	12	125	−113	0	withdrew (Note: Dinamo Plus withdrew from the league after round 14. All remaining fixtures are awarded 0–3 against them.)

Source: FMF, Soccerway
Rules for classification: 1) Points; 2) Head-to-head points; 3) Head-to-head goal difference; 4) Head-to-head away goals scored; 5) Head-to-head goals scored; 6) Matches won; 7) Goal difference; 8) Goals scored; 9) Less red cards; 10) Less yellow cards.
(C) Champions; (P) Promoted

=== Results ===
Teams will play each other twice (once home, once away).

Home \ Away	ATL	CIM	CON	CRI	DIN	MAI	OGU	SAK	SLO	SOC	STĂ	VĂS
Atletic Strășeni	—	1–0	3–0 (Note: Atletic received a 3–0 technical win in a home game against Congaz. The original match was abandoned after 53 minutes, with the score 3–1 at the time, as Congaz left the pitch in protest at a referee’s decision.)	0–2	13–0	7–2	4–1	1–4	3–1	6–2	0–4	2–3
Cimișlia	2–2	—	3–2	0–0	8–0	7–2	1–3	4–0	4–0	0–3	1–2	1–1
Congaz	0–3	1–4	—	0–2	3–0 (Note: Technical wins/losses)	2–1	2–0	4–1	0–2	2–1	0–1	1–3
Cricova	0–0	2–2	4–3	—	5–0	3–0	3–0	4–0	1–1	6–0	1–0	3–4
Dinamo Plus	0–3	2–4	2–5	0–3	—	0–8	0–3	0–3	2–3	2–5	0–3 (Note: Stăuceni received a 3–0 technical win in a away game against Dinamo Plus. The match was not played because Dinamo Plus does not have the minimum number of seven players at the beginning of the match)	1–9
Maiak Chirsova	1–1	1–3	2–2	1–3	3–0	—	1–2	1–1	1–1	1–0	1–4	0–3
Oguzsport Comrat	2–1	1–2	2–4	1–0	7–1	6–5	—	3–0	2–1	2–2	0–0	0–3
Saksan	4–0	1–0	0–2	1–1	11–0	6–4	3–3	—	5–1	5–0	0–1	2–1
Slobozia Mare	1–1	5–2	4–1	3–0 (Note: Cricova was awarded a technical loss against Slobozia Mare due to their failure to appear at their round 2 match)	12–1	3–1	4–3	9–0	—	1–0	0–3 (Note: Slobozia Mare received a 0–3 technical loss in a home game against Stăuceni due to violation of regulations. The original match ended in a 2–0 victory for Stăuceni.)	1–0
Socol Copceac	1–1	2–1	1–2	0–2	3–0	1–3	0–3	0–2	0–0	—	0–1	0–4
Stăuceni	0–2	2–3	4–0	3–0	8–1	5–1	4–3	5–1	2–0	7–2	—	1–0
Văsieni	3–0	4–1	2–1	6–1	3–0	7–0	2–2	1–0	6–1	5–0	3–2	—

Source: FMF (in Romanian)
Legend: Blue = home team win; Yellow = draw; Red = away team win.

== Top goalscorers ==
Rank	Player	Club	Goals
1	(Moldova) Alexei Diordiev	Stăuceni	20
2	(Moldova) Ilie Cornescu	Cimișlia	18
2	(Moldova) Maxim Golovatîi	Fălești	18
4	(Moldova) Dan Mihuță	Maiak	17
4	(Moldova) Serghei Popovici	Edineț	17
4	(Moldova) Robert Turava	Fălești	17
