= 1999–2000 Moldovan "A" Division =

Moldovan "A" Division
- Season: 1999–2000
- Champions: Sheriff-2 Tiraspol
- Promoted: Haiducul Sporting Hîncești

The 1999–2000 Moldovan "A" Division season is the 9th since its establishment. A total of 14 teams are contesting the league.

== League table ==
Pos	Team	Pld	W	D	L	GF	GA	GD	Pts	Promotion
1	Sheriff-2 Tiraspol (C)	26	19	4	3	53	16	+37	61	Ineligible for promotion
2	Haiducul Sporting Hîncești (P)	26	18	5	3	44	21	+23	59	Promotion to Divizia Națională
3	Petrocub-Spicul Sărata-Galbenă	26	15	5	6	49	21	+28	50	
4	Intersport Chișinău	26	14	6	6	42	20	+22	48	
5	Cimentul Rîbnița	26	13	3	10	32	34	−2	42	
6	Venita Lipcani	26	10	7	9	37	32	+5	37	
7	Zimbru-2 Chișinău	26	9	8	9	37	25	+12	35	Ineligible for promotion
8	Dinamo-Stimold Bender	26	10	3	13	27	36	−9	33	
9	ULIM Chișinău	26	7	8	11	27	34	−7	29	
10	Unisport-2 Chișinău	26	7	7	12	28	40	−12	28	Ineligible for promotion
11	Maiak Chirsova	26	7	4	15	26	46	−20	25	
12	Raut Orhei	26	6	6	14	23	49	−26	24	
13	Dumbrava Cojușna	26	7	2	17	26	47	−21	23	
14	CSA Victoria Chișinău	26	5	2	19	23	53	−30	17	

Source: RSSSF
(C) Champions; (P) Promoted
