= 2023–24 Moldovan Liga 2 =

Liga 2
- Season: 2023–24
- Dates: 12 August 2023 – 18 May 2024

The 2023–24 Moldovan Liga 2 was the 33rd season of Moldovan football's third-tier league. The season started on 12 August 2023 and ended on 18 May 2024. The league consisted of two regional groups, Nord (North) and Sud (South).

== North ==
Pos	Team	Pld	W	D	L	GF	GA	GD	Pts	Promotion or relegation
1	Vulturii Cutezători (C, P)	22	19	3	0	59	16	+43	60	Promotion to Liga 1
2	EFA Visoca	22	18	2	2	80	18	+62	56	
3	Locomotiva Ocnița	22	13	5	4	50	21	+29	44	
4	Olimpia Bălți	22	12	2	8	52	39	+13	38	
5	Edineț	22	9	6	7	43	36	+7	33	
6	Pepeni	22	8	3	11	32	37	−5	27	withdrew (Note: Pepeni completed the season but were refused the licence and withdrew from the league prior to the start of the next season.)
7	Barsa Ungheni	22	8	2	12	47	50	−3	26	
8	Rîșcani	22	7	4	11	33	57	−24	25	withdrew (Note: Rîșcani completed the season but were refused the licence and withdrew from the league prior to the start of the next season.)
9	Grănicerul Glodeni	22	7	3	12	31	52	−21	24	
10	Țarigrad	22	5	2	15	32	62	−30	17	
11	Inter Soroca	22	4	4	14	31	57	−26	16	withdrew (Note: Inter Soroca completed the season but withdrew from the league prior to the start of the next season.)
12	FC Visoca	22	3	2	17	18	63	−45	11	withdrew (Note: FC Visoca withdrew from the league after round 11. All remaining fixtures were awarded 0–3 against them.)

Source: FMF, Soccerway
Rules for classification: 1) Points; 2) Head-to-head points; 3) Head-to-head goal difference; 4) Head-to-head goals scored; 5) Matches won; 6) Goal difference; 7) Goals scored; 8) Less red cards; 9) Less yellow cards.
(C) Champions; (P) Promoted

=== Results ===
Teams will play each other twice (once home, once away).

Home \ Away	BAR	EDI	EFA	GRĂ	INT	LOC	OLI	PEP	RÎȘ	ȚAR	VIS	VUL
Barsa Ungheni	—	2–3	0–3	2–3	6–1	0–3	5–0	1–4	4–1	1–4	6–1	1–4
Edineț	1–2	—	1–2	6–2	2–2	1–1	4–3	2–1	2–3	1–0	2–2	0–2
EFA Visoca	7–1	0–0	—	5–0	6–2	0–1	6–1	1–0	7–0	6–1	3–0 (Note: Technical wins/losses)	0–2
Grănicerul Glodeni	4–1	3–1	1–4	—	0–3	2–2	0–0	1–1	2–3	0–1	3–0	1–4
Inter Soroca	1–3	1–1	0–6	0–1	—	0–1	1–3	3–1	2–3	0–1	3–0	0–1
Locomotiva Ocnița	1–1	3–2	0–2	2–0	6–1	—	1–2	4–0	4–0	7–0	3–0	1–1
Olimpia Bălți	4–2	1–2	1–2	2–0	2–0	2–2	—	1–3	5–2	4–1	3–1	0–1
Pepeni	2–1	1–3	2–5	0–1	0–3	2–0	1–4	—	1–1	3–1	1–1	0–1
Rîșcani	1–1	0–0	0–2	0–3	3–1	1–3	1–6	1–2	—	1–0	3–0	2–4
Țarigrad	0–3	2–6	0–7	9–1	2–2	1–2	1–4	1–4	3–3	—	0–1	0–1
FC Visoca	0–3	0–3	3–4	2–1	6–2	0–2	0–3	0–3	1–4	0–3	—	0–3
Vulturii Cutezători	2–1	3–0	2–2	4–2	3–3	3–1	3–1	1–0	4–0	5–1	5–0	—

Source: FMF (in Romanian)
Legend: Blue = home team win; Yellow = draw; Red = away team win.

== South ==
Pos	Team	Pld	W	D	L	GF	GA	GD	Pts	Promotion or relegation
1	Stăuceni (C, P)	22	18	3	1	76	18	+58	57	Promotion to Liga 1
2	Chișinău	22	14	5	3	63	21	+42	47	
3	Constructorul Leova	22	10	8	4	36	21	+15	38	
4	Socol Copceac	22	10	7	5	40	32	+8	37	
5	Codru Călărași	22	11	3	8	46	34	+12	36	
6	La Familia	22	10	5	7	43	38	+5	35	
7	Atletic Strășeni	22	8	4	10	31	45	−14	28	
8	Slobozia Mare	22	7	5	10	31	41	−10	26	withdrew (Note: Slobozia Mare completed the season but withdrew from the league prior to the start of the next season.)
9	Cricova	22	7	4	11	39	43	−4	25	withdrew (Note: Cricova completed the season but withdrew from the league prior to the start of the next season.)
10	Congaz	22	4	4	14	24	60	−36	16	
11	Ghidighici	22	3	3	16	29	63	−34	12	withdrew (Note: Ghidighici withdrew from the league after round 14. All remaining fixtures were awarded 0–3 against them.)
12	Maiak Chirsova (Note: Maiak Chirsova avoided relegation due to lack of teams.)	22	2	5	15	27	69	−42	11	

Source: FMF, Soccerway
Rules for classification: 1) Points; 2) Head-to-head points; 3) Head-to-head goal difference; 4) Head-to-head goals scored; 5) Matches won; 6) Goal difference; 7) Goals scored; 8) Less red cards; 9) Less yellow cards.
(C) Champions; (P) Promoted

=== Results ===
Teams will play each other twice (once home, once away).

Home \ Away	ATL	CHI	COD	CNG	CNS	CRI	GHI	LAF	MAI	SLO	SOC	STĂ
Atletic Strășeni	—	0–3	1–1	6–1	0–0	0–1	3–0 (Note: Technical wins/losses)	1–0	2–1	3–1	0–3	0–4
Chișinău	3–0	—	4–1	12–0	1–1	1–0	2–2	4–2	4–0	2–0	2–0	2–2
Codru Călărași	1–2	2–5	—	1–0	1–2	3–1	4–0	4–1	4–0	3–0	0–3	2–4
Congaz	5–1	0–0	2–5	—	1–2	3–2	3–0	0–1	1–1	0–0	0–1	0–3
Constructorul Leova	2–0	4–1	0–1	2–0	—	2–0	3–0	0–0	5–1	0–1	0–0	2–2
Cricova	2–2	1–4	0–3 (Note: Cricova received a 0–3 technical loss in a home game against Codru for fielding an ineligible player. The original match ended in a 2–0 victory for Cricova.)	3–0	1–1	—	2–0	1–2	6–3	4–4	4–1	0–4
Ghidighici	2–3	0–1	0–3	6–1	2–3	0–3	—	2–3	4–2	0–3	2–2	0–3
La Familia	4–2	0–5	2–2	5–1	2–3	3–1	3–0	—	5–1	3–0	2–2	0–4
Maiak Chirsova	2–3	0–5	0–3	1–2	1–1	0–0	4–1	1–1	—	3–0	3–3	2–6
Slobozia Mare	1–1	3–1	0–0	2–2	3–1	2–4	3–4	0–2	2–0	—	3–2	2–1
Socol Copceac	2–1	1–1	3–2	3–2	1–0	2–1	3–3	1–1	4–0	2–1	—	1–2
Stăuceni	6–0	2–0	4–0	3–0 (Note: Congaz was awarded a technical loss against Stăuceni due to their failure to appear at their round 18 match.)	2–2	3–2	6–1	3–1	7–1	3–0	2–0	—

Source: FMF (in Romanian)
Legend: Blue = home team win; Yellow = draw; Red = away team win.

== Top goalscorers ==
Rank	Player	Club	Goals
1	(Moldova) Andrei Stratan	EFA Visoca	25
2	(Moldova) Denis Secureanu	Vulturii Cutezători	24
3	(Moldova) Igor Țîgîrlaș	Stăuceni	21
4	(Moldova) Ion Pavlov	Stăuceni (6) & FC Visoca (9)	15
5	(Moldova) Ion Pahomea	Barsa	12
5	(Moldova) Andrei Tontici	Codru	12
5	(Moldova) Vasile Pașa	EFA Visoca	12
8	(Moldova) Rostislav Garganciuc	Locomotiva	11
8	(Moldova) Alexandru Cristioglo	EFA Visoca	11
8	(Moldova) Marian Stoleru	Constructorul	11
8	(Moldova) Igor Lohov	Chișinău	11
8	(Moldova) Anatolie Mateițov	Olimpia (9) & Locomotiva (2)	11
