= Alexandru Popovici (Moldovan footballer) =

Moldovan footballer

Personal information
- Date of birth: 9 April 1977 (age 49)
- Place of birth: Tiraspol, Moldavian SSR, Soviet Union
- Height: 1.86 m (6 ft 1 in)
- Position: Forward

Team information
- Current team: FC Oguz Comrat
- Number: 17

Senior career*
Years	Team	Apps	(Gls)
1994–1999	Tiligul Tiraspol	103	(39)
1998	→ MSV Duisburg (loan)	4	(0)
1999	Dynamo Moscow	1	(0)
1999–2000	Torpedo-ZIL Moscow	34	(5)
2001	Seongnam Ilhwa Chunma	6	(0)
2002	Constructorul Cioburcu	2	(0)
2002–2004	Dnipro Dnipropetrovsk	14	(1)
2003	→ Dnipro-2 Dnipropetrovsk	4	(1)
2004–2006	Kryvbas Kryvyi Rih	52	(9)
2007–2008	Zorya Luhansk	22	(1)
2008–2009	Tiligul-Tiras Tiraspol	15	(6)
2008	→ Dacia Chișinău (loan)	8	(1)
2009	→ Simurq Zaqatala (loan)	1	(0)
2009	→ Dinamo Bender (loan)	16	(4)
2010–2011	Iskra-Stal	48	(21)
2011	Andijan	12	(1)
2012–2014	Tiraspol	56	(13)
2014–2015	Saxan	21	(7)
2015	Academia Chișinău	13	(1)
2016–2017	Dinamo-Auto	31	(1)
2018–2019	Florești	23	(4)
2020	Spartanii Selemet	1	(1)
2021–2024	Iskra Rîbnița		
2024–2025	Olimp Comrat		
2026–	FC Oguz Comrat		

International career
- Moldova U21
1996–2005	Moldova	21	(3)
- * Club domestic league appearances and goals as of 26 May 2025

Alexandru Popovici (born 9 April 1977) is a Moldovan professional footballer who plays as a forward for Moldovan Liga 1 club FC Oguz Comrat.

Between 1996 and 2005 Popovici played for the Moldova national team 21 matches, scoring three goals.

== Career statistics ==
Scores and results list Moldova's goal tally first.

No	Date	Venue	Opponent	Score	Result	Competition
1.	9 April 1996	Stadionul Republican, Chișinău, Moldova	Ukraine	2–2	2–2	Friendly match
2.	2 February 2000	Ammochostos Stadium, Larnaca, Cyprus	Armenia	1–1	1–2	Cyprus International Tournament
3.	6 February 2000	GSZ Stadium, Larnaca, Cyprus	Slovakia	2–0	2–0	Cyprus International Tournament

== Honours ==
Tiligul Tiraspol

- Moldavian Cup: 1994, 1995

MSV Duisburg

- DFB-Pokal runner-up: 1997–98

FC Tiraspol

- Moldavian Cup: 2012–13
