= 1998–99 Moldovan "A" Division =

Moldovan "A" Division
- Season: 1998–99
- Champions: Zimbru-2 Chișinău
- Promoted: Energhetic Dubăsari

The 1998–99 Moldovan "A" Division season is the 8th since its establishment. A total of 16 teams are contesting the league.

== League table ==
Pos	Team	Pld	W	D	L	GF	GA	GD	Pts	Promotion, qualification or relegation
1	Zimbru-2 Chișinău (C)	30	23	4	3	84	20	+64	73	Ineligible for promotion
2	Sheriff-2 Tiraspol	30	21	5	4	77	26	+51	68	Ineligible for promotion
3	Energhetic Dubăsari (P)	30	17	7	6	42	28	+14	58	Promotion to Divizia Națională
4	Migdal Carahasani	30	17	6	7	56	30	+26	57	Qualification for the promotion play-off
5	Locomotiva Basarabeasca	30	17	3	10	41	38	+3	54	
6	ULIM-Tebas Chișinău	30	15	6	9	50	29	+21	51	
7	Cimentul Rîbnița	30	15	6	9	47	33	+14	51	
8	Dumbrava Cojușna	30	13	9	8	41	32	+9	48	
9	Venita Lipcani	30	13	6	11	36	34	+2	45	
10	Petrocub-Spicul Sărata-Galbenă	30	12	8	10	62	35	+27	44	
11	Sporting Chișinău	30	10	7	13	45	42	+3	37	
12	CSA Victoria Chișinău	30	9	5	16	31	46	−15	32	
13	Raut Orhei	30	8	3	19	29	79	−50	27	
14	Codru-Stimold Chișinău	30	5	4	21	19	74	−55	19	
15	Speranța Nisporeni	30	1	4	25	13	99	−86	7	
16	Dinamo Bender	30	1	3	26	12	40	−28	6	

Source: RSSSF
(C) Champions; (P) Promoted

== Promotion/relegation play-off ==
Unisport Chișinău remained in the Divizia Națională after Migdal Carahasani withdrew.
