= 2025–26 Moldovan Liga 2 =

Liga 2
- Season: 2025–26
- Dates: 16 August 2025 – 9 May 2026
- Promoted: Vulturii Cutezători; Național Ialoveni

The 2025–26 Moldovan Liga 2 was the 35th season of Moldovan football's third-tier league. The season started on 16 August 2025 and ended on 9 May 2026. The league consisted of two regional groups, Nord (North) and Sud (South).

== North ==
Pos	Team	Pld	W	D	L	GF	GA	GD	Pts	Promotion, qualification or relegation
1	Vulturii Cutezători (C, P)	18	15	2	1	66	23	+43	47	Promotion to Liga 1
2	EFA Visoca	18	13	1	4	60	28	+32	40	
3	Speranța Drochia	18	10	3	5	49	32	+17	33	
4	Steaua Nordului	18	9	2	7	33	31	+2	29 (Note: Head-to-head goal difference: Steaua Nordului : +1, Țarigrad : –1.)	
5	Țarigrad	18	9	2	7	48	33	+15	29	
6	Edineț	18	9	1	8	47	42	+5	28	
7	Locomotiva Ocnița	18	8	1	9	35	35	0	25	
8	Atletico Bălți (O)	18	6	1	11	33	35	−2	19	Qualification for the relegation play-offs
9	Olimpia Bălți (R)	18	4	1	13	31	64	−33	13	Relegation to regional level
10	Grănicerul Glodeni (R)	18	0	0	18	11	90	−79	0	Relegation to regional level

Source: FMF, Soccerway
Rules for classification: 1) Points; 2) Head-to-head points; 3) Head-to-head goal difference; 4) Head-to-head goals scored; 5) Matches won; 6) Goal difference; 7) Goals scored; 8) Less red cards; 9) Less yellow cards.
(C) Champions; (O) Play-off winners; (P) Promoted; (R) Relegated

=== Results ===
Teams will play each other twice (once home, once away).

Home \ Away	ATL	EDI	EFA	GRĂ	LOC	OLI	SPE	STE	ȚAR	VUL
Atletico Bălți	—	2–1	2–1	6–0	0–1	0–4	1–2	3–0	0–3	1–3
Edineț	3–1	—	1–2	2–1	0–1	2–1	2–6	4–3	2–0	4–4
EFA Visoca	3–2	6–2	—	8–0	2–3	2–0	3–2	4–1	0–4	1–4
Grănicerul Glodeni	0–3	0–5	1–7	—	2–7	1–2	0–1	1–3	1–4	1–8
Locomotiva Ocnița	2–0	0–3	1–2	5–0	—	2–3	1–2	0–1	1–0	1–6
Olimpia Bălți	0–7	2–8	1–7	5–1	1–6	—	1–5	0–1	2–5	1–2
Speranța Drochia	3–1	4–3	2–5	5–1	6–2	2–2	—	0–0	2–3	0–1
Steaua Nordului	1–1	1–0	1–3	5–0	3–1	6–3	1–0	—	1–2	0–3
Țarigrad	5–2	1–2	1–1	9–0	1–1	3–2	4–6	1–3	—	0–4
Vulturii Cutezători	3–1	7–3	0–3	5–1	3–0	4–1	1–1	5–2	3–2	—

Source: FMF (in Romanian)
Legend: Blue = home team win; Yellow = draw; Red = away team win.

== South ==
Pos	Team	Pld	W	D	L	GF	GA	GD	Pts	Promotion or relegation
1	Național Ialoveni (C, P)	18	14	1	3	68	21	+47	43	Promotion to Liga 1
2	Real Succes	18	10	4	4	38	28	+10	34	withdrew (Note: Real Succes completed the season but withdrew from the league prior to the start of the next season.)
3	Atletic Strășeni	18	10	3	5	40	25	+15	33	
4	Congaz	18	10	2	6	45	32	+13	32	
5	Chișinău	18	9	3	6	37	33	+4	30	
6	Constructorul Leova	18	8	2	8	39	44	−5	26	
7	CMF Cahul	18	6	4	8	32	38	−6	22	
8	Maiak Chirsova (O)	18	4	4	10	19	38	−19	16	Qualification for the relegation play-offs
9	FCM Ungheni-2 (R)	18	4	3	11	28	50	−22	15	Relegation to regional level
10	Socol Copceac (R)	18	1	2	15	22	59	−37	5	Relegation to regional level

Source: FMF, Soccerway
Rules for classification: 1) Points; 2) Head-to-head points; 3) Head-to-head goal difference; 4) Head-to-head goals scored; 5) Matches won; 6) Goal difference; 7) Goals scored; 8) Less red cards; 9) Less yellow cards.
(C) Champions; (O) Play-off winners; (P) Promoted; (R) Relegated

=== Results ===
Teams will play each other twice (once home, once away).

Home \ Away	ATL	CAH	CHI	CNG	CNS	MAI	NAȚ	REA	SOC	UNG
Atletic Strășeni	—	0–0	5–3	5–0	5–0	3–1	0–1	0–1	5–0	1–1
CMF Cahul	1–2	—	1–1	3–2	1–1	2–1	1–3	2–3	3–2	6–0
Chișinău	2–3	2–1	—	2–1	2–2	0–0	1–0	3–1	5–0	3–1
Congaz	1–2	4–1	1–0	—	1–2	1–0	3–2	3–3	4–2	4–1
Constructorul Leova	4–1	3–1	2–5	1–7	—	3–0	1–4	0–1	3–1	2–3
Maiak Chirsova	0–3	0–1	2–1	1–3	3–6	—	0–4	1–1	2–2	2–2
Național Ialoveni	8–1	5–1	9–1	3–2	1–0	2–3	—	1–1	7–1	5–1
Real Succes	1–0	5–2	2–0	0–0	1–4	4–1	1–4	—	4–1	2–3
Socol Copceac	0–3	3–3	0–3	2–4	1–2	0–1	2–4	2–4	—	3–0 (Note: FCM Ungheni-2 was awarded a technical loss against Socol due to their failure to appear at their round 1 match The team mistakenly traveled to Copceac, Ștefan Vodă, instead the Copceac, Gagauzia. They're 188 km appart.)
FCM Ungheni-2	1–1	1–2	2–3	2–4	6–3	0–1	1–5	1–3	2–0	—

Source: FMF (in Romanian)
Legend: Blue = home team win; Yellow = draw; Red = away team win.

=== Liga 2 play-offs ===
23 May 2026	Atletico Bălți	3–3 (5–4 p)	Saksan	Bălți
16:00 EEST	Babiuc 52'; Palii 72' (pen.); Novicov 80'		Constantinov 36'; Covalenco 14', 45' (pen.)	Stadium: Locomotiv Stadium; Referee: Viktor Bugenko

23 May 2026	Maiak Chirsova	3–1	Avîntul Nimoreni	Chirsova
16:00 EEST	Pahomea 16', 53', 58'		Bogdan 22'	Stadium: Chirsova Stadium; Referee: Petru Ciorba

== Top goalscorers ==
Rank	Player	Club	Goals
1	(Moldova) Denis Secureanu	Vulturii Cutezători	18
2	(Moldova) Adrian Rusu	Național	17
2	(Moldova) Andrian Dodan	Național	17
4	(Moldova) Serghei Mișcov	Speranța	16
5	(Moldova) Piotr Gherman	EFA Visoca	15
6	(Moldova) Roman Șumchin	Congaz	14
7	(Moldova) Valentin Ceavdari	Steaua Nordului	13
8	(Moldova) Stanislav Prodan	Chișinău	11
8	(Moldova) Vasile Pașa	EFA Visoca	11
8	(Moldova) Alexandru Vlas	Constructorul	11
