= Zotsara Randriambololona =

Footballer (born 1994)

Personal information
- Date of birth: 22 April 1994 (age 32)
- Place of birth: Nice, France
- Height: 1.78 m (5 ft 10 in)
- Position: Midfielder

Team information
- Current team: Al-Entesar
- Number: 10

Senior career*
Years	Team	Apps	(Gls)
2012–2013	Sedan B	10	(1)
2013–2014	Auxerre B	14	(1)
2014–2017	Virton	58	(10)
2017–2019	Antwerp	3	(0)
2018	→ Roeselare (loan)	1	(0)
2019–2021	Fleury 91	23	(2)
2021–2023	Bălți	36	(1)
2023–2024	Al-Nojoom		
2024–	Al-Entesar		

International career^{‡}
2015–	Madagascar	15	(0)
- * Club domestic league appearances and goals as of 18:32, 26 September 2023 (UTC) ‡ National team caps and goals as of 22:49, 6 November 2021 (UTC)

Zotsara Randriambololona (born 22 April 1994), also known as Zout, is a professional footballer who plays for Saudi club Al-Entesar as a midfielder. Born in France, he plays for the Madagascar national team.

== Club career ==
Born in Nice, France, Randriambololona has played for Sedan B, Auxerre B, Excelsior Virton, Antwerp and Roeselare. In January 2019, he moved to FC Fleury 91. In October 2021, he moved to Moldovan club Bălți.

== International career ==
He made his international debut for Madagascar in 2015, and earned a total of 15 caps as of now.
