= Theocharis Pozatzidis =

Greek footballer

Personal information
- Date of birth: 18 February 1999 (age 27)
- Place of birth: Thessaloniki, Greece
- Height: 1.93 m (6 ft 4 in)
- Position: Striker

Team information
- Current team: PAEEK
- Number: 9

Youth career
- –2017: PAONE
- 2017–2018: Platanias

Senior career*
Years	Team	Apps	(Gls)
2018–2019	Platanias	9	(0)
2019–2020	Ermionida		
2020	Trikala	2	(0)
2020–2021	Triglia	14	(4)
2021–2022	Kallithea	2	(1)
2022	Irodotos	19	(10)
2022–2023	Sfîntul Gheorghe	17	(3)
2023–2024	Kozani	24	(1)
2024	Mioveni	11	(1)
2025	Avezzano	9	(0)
2025–	PAEEK	12	(4)
- * Club domestic league appearances and goals as of 3 May 2026

Theocharis Pozatzidis (Greek: Θεοχάρης Ποζατζίδης; born 18 February 1999) is a Greek professional footballer who plays as a striker for Cypriot club PAEEK.

== Personal life ==
Pozatzidis' cousin, Stelios, is also a professional footballer.

== Honours ==
Trikala

- Football League: 2019–20
