= FC Victoria Ialoveni =

Victoria
- Full name: Fotbal Club Victoria
- Founded: 29 March 1995
- Chairman: Eduard Munteanu
- Manager: Vasile Curchi
- League: Liga 1
- 2025–26: Liga 1, Group 2, 6th of 8

Fotbal Club Victoria , commonly known as Victoria, is a Moldovan football club based in Ialoveni, Moldova. They play in Liga 1, the second tier of Moldovan football.

== History ==
The club was founded on 29 March 1995 by Vasile Roșioru and Boris DucaBetween 1995 and 2015, the team was known as FC Victoria Bardar.Victoria last played in the village of Bardar on 6 November 2011 and between 2012 and 2026 hosted its home matches in Chișinău at the Joma Arena.From June 2013 the club has moved its legal address to Chișinău and from June 2026 to Ialoveni.

=== Liga 2 years (1999-2012) ===
From 1999 to 2012, Victoria Bardar competed in Divizia B, finishing: seventh (1999–2000), 6th (2003–2004), 4th (2005–2006), 6th (2006–2007), 3rd (2007–2008), 3rd (2008–2009), 2nd (2009–2010), 1st (2010–2011), before eventually promoting in 2012 alongside Veris into the Divizia A .

=== First Liga 1 seasons (2012-2016) ===
==== 2012-2013 Season ====
Victoria's first official Divizia A game was played against Sfântul Gheorghe Suruceni on the 12th of August 2012. The score was 1-3 for Sfantul Gheorghe. On September 15, 2012, divizia a.md stated that Victoria was "one of the weakest teams in the league". The club finished tenth in the league.

==== 2013-2014 Season ====
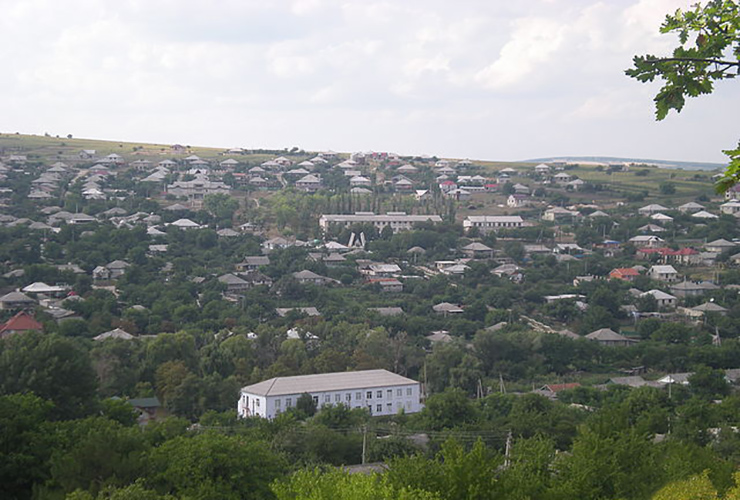
Bardar, the village where Victoria was based in.

The club's season did not start well, going the first four games winless. However, manager Alexandru Novicov remained optimistic about the season stating: "We had good chances in every game. It's unfortunate the fact that we have no wins. But in the dressing room there isn't a lack of morale, in fact the players are very motivated." Novicov's words were true. Despite a 1–4 loss to league leaders Saxan Gagauz Yeri in November, the club remained consistent and finished the season in third place.

==== 2014-2015 Season ====
The club had recruited a few players with top-flight experience such as Gheorghe Tonu, Dumitru Berbinschi and Alexei Luchita, the club was dreaming about the Divizia Nationala. The club started well. A 0–0 with revelation Petrocub and a 4–0 win over Real Succes set the stage for a title charge. However, the club would not manage to keep up with the other clubs and would finish a low seventh place, 13 points behind Speranța Nisporeni, the last club which promoted into The Divizia Nationala.

==== 2015-2016 Season ====
Former club crest

Victoria arranged a few friendlies for the new season. One of them being against Sfântul Gheorghe Suruceni, where Novicov's men won 1–0. Victoria's manager, Alexandru Novicov, thought that the club was going to finish on the podium. The club also transferred Vadim Crîcimari from Tosno. The club was looking on track to finish on the podium. In November, Victoria beat Dacia 2-Buiucani 5–0 away, with Cricimari scoring 4. However, this season was similar to the last one. Victoria underdelivered, finishing a disappointing seventh.

==== 2016-2017 Season ====
This time the club was determined to finish top 4. The club transferred Ghenadie Orbu from Spicul Chișcăreni. Last season, Orbu scored 22 goals and was top scorer of the Divizia A. Orbu's impact was felt. Victoria won the first game of the season 5–0 against Prut Leova. Manager Novicov stated: "I am happy with our game. We scored beautiful goals. I can't remember the last time we have started the season with such a win"! This time Victoria kept up and finished fourth, with 64, just 2 away from promotion.

=== The breakthrough: The 2017 season ===
Victoria was once again in the fight for the podium. But this time it was different. They just kept on winning. It started with a 1–0 over Sheriff-2, then Iskra, then Zimbru-2. Victoria kept winning. Who was behind it? Orbu, with 22 goals. In the end, Victoria won the 2017 Moldovan "A" Division with 38 points. However, Novicov said they should have won the league faster: "Sure this was a great season. We have accomplished our goals. But we could have done better." However, the club received the Divizia Nationala three days before its start, and that meant the club would stay in the Divizia A.

== Achievements ==
- Moldovan Liga 1
  - Winners (1): 2017
- Moldovan Liga 2
  - Winners (2): 2010–11, 2011–12 (Center)
