= Federico Nsue =

Equatoguinean footballer (born 1997)

Personal information
- Full name: Federico Nsue Nguema
- Date of birth: 20 April 1997 (age 29)
- Place of birth: Malabo, Equatorial Guinea
- Height: 1.65 m (5 ft 5 in)
- Position: Midfielder

Team information
- Current team: Sidama Coffee

Youth career
- 201?–20??: Cano Sport

Senior career*
Years	Team	Apps	(Gls)
201?–2022	Cano Sport		
2022–2023	Dinamo-Auto	14	(0)
2023–2025	Bălți	42	(1)
2025	Cano Sport		
2025–	Sidama Coffee		

International career^{‡}
2016–	Equatorial Guinea	2	(0)
- * Club domestic league appearances and goals as of 5 January 2025 ‡ National team caps and goals as of 11 October 2016

Federico Nsue Nguema (born 20 April 1997), also known as Papa, is an Equatoguinean professional footballer who plays as a midfielder for Ethiopian Premier League club Sidama Coffee and the Equatorial Guinea national team.

== Club career ==
On 15 October 2025, Nsue joined Ethiopian Premier League club Sidama Coffee.

== International career ==
Nsue made his international debut for Equatorial Guinea on 12 June 2016.
