= FC Stăuceni =

Moldovan football club

- Founded: 30 September 2020; 6 years ago
- Ground: Stadionul Olimp Stăuceni
- Capacity: 750
- Owner: Vladimir Rebeja
- Manager: Alexandru Glinca
- League: Liga 1
- 2025–26: 1st, Group A

FC Stăuceni is a Moldovan association football club based in Stăuceni. The club currently competes in the Liga 1, the second tier of football in Moldova.

== History ==
FC Stăuceni was founded on 30 September 2020. It first participated in the Moldovan league system in the 2021–22 Moldovan "B" Division. The club dominated the South Series of Liga 2 in 2023–24, clinching the division title with four matches remaining and earning promotion to Liga 1 for the 2024–25 season. Sergiu Japalau took over as head coach prior to the new campaign with the tactician noting that it would be a challenge to rebuild the roster after many of the players who helped earn promotion had left the club. In July 2024, FC Stăuceni unveiled a new logo which is highly influenced by the town's coat of arms. Previously, the village of Stăuceni did not have an official coat of arms. However, the National Heraldry Commission created the symbol for the community after it was granted town status earlier that year. In preparation for the new season, FC Stăuceni played a friendly against FC Iskra Rîbnița who would also play in Liga 1 Group B during the upcoming campaign. Stăuceni won the match 3–1. That season, the club opened its season away at FC Speranța Drochia.

FC Stăuceni went undefeated through the first eleven matches of the 2025–26 season. Its streak was finally ended with a defeat away to FC Real Sireți on Matchday 12. That season, FC Stăuceni narrowly missed promotion to the top-flight Moldovan Liga after falling to FC Iskra Rîbnița 1–3 in the play-off semi-final.

== Recent seasons ==
Key

Champion Runners-up 3rd place

Season	Phase/Series	League							Play-offs	Notes
Season	Phase/Series	Div.	Pos.	Pl.	W	D	L	P	Play-offs	Notes
2021–22	South	III	2nd	22	17	1	4	52	N/A	
2022–23	South	III	3rd	22	15	4	3	49	N/A	
2023–24	South	III	1st	22	18	3	1	57	N/A	Promoted to Liga 1
2024–25	Phase I (Group B)	II	2nd	15	8	2	5	26	N/A	
2024–25	Phase II (Group 1)	II	3rd	10	6	1	3	19	Quarter-finals	
2025–26	Phase I (Group A)	II	1st	15	12	2	1	38	N/A	
2025–26	Phase II (Group 1)	II	6th	10	0	5	5	5	Semi-finals	
2026–27	Phase I (Group B)	II							N/A	
2026–27	Phase II (Group 1)	II								
