= Ungheni Stadium =

Football Stadium in Moldova

- Stadionul Municipal Ungheni
- Interactive map of Ungheni Stadium
- Full name: Ungheni Municipal Stadium
- Address: str. Bălcescu 9
- Location: Ungheni
- Coordinates: 47.212778°N 27.800000°E
- Owner: Ungheni
- Capacity: 350
- Surface: Artificial turf
- Field size: 105 by 65 metres (114.8 yd × 71.1 yd)

Construction
- Expanded: 2014

Tenants
- FCM Ungheni; Barsa Ungheni

Ungheni Stadium is a football stadium in Ungheni, Moldova, which has a seating capacity of 350. It is home of FCM Ungheni and FC Barsa Ungheni.

It was renovated in 2014 and since then has hosted games of Moldovan Super Liga and Moldovan Liga 1.

In 2023 it became a multi-functional arena as there were added a basketball court, a table tennis area and a teqball area.
