= FC Cimișlia =

FC Cimişlia
- Full name: Fotbal Club Cimişlia
- Founded: 2009
- Dissolved: 2023 (senior team)
- Ground: Stadionul Orăşenesc, Cimişlia, Moldova

FC Cimişlia was a Moldovan football club based in Cimişlia, Moldova.

== League results ==
Season	Div.	Pos.	Pl.	W	D	L	GS	GA	P	Cup	Europe	Top Scorer (League)	Head Coach
2010–11	3rd "Center"	9_{/10}	18	2	3	13	24	65	9	2nd PR	—		
2011–12	3rd "South"									1st PR	—		(Moldova) Sergiu Spatarel
