= Selemet =

- Village
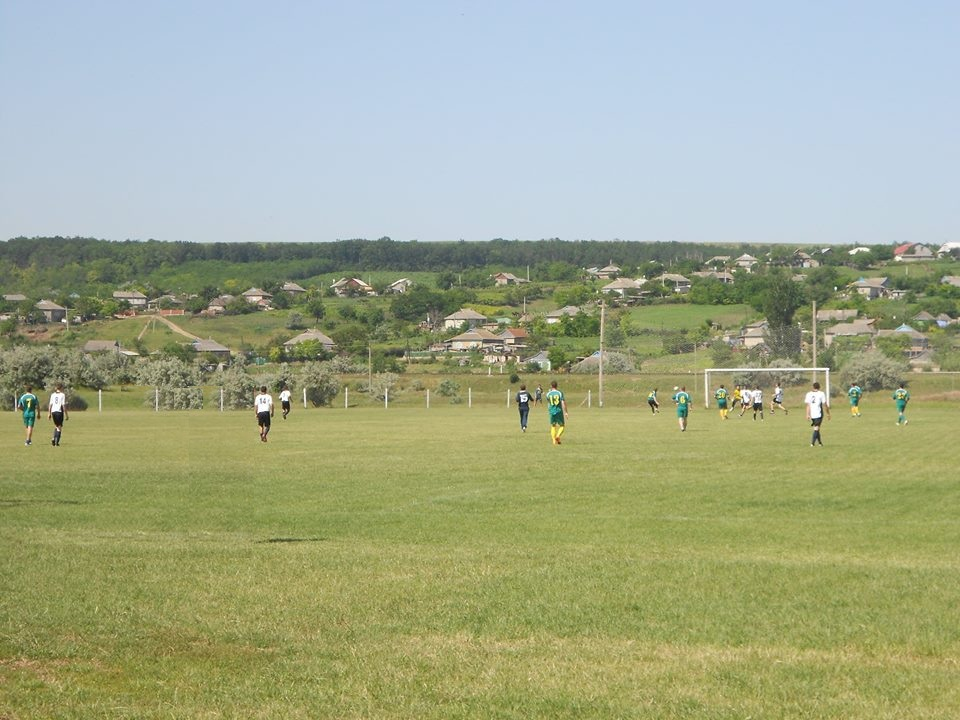

- Location within Moldova
- Coordinates: 46°34′46″N 28°55′25″E
- Country: Moldova
- District: Cimișlia

Government
  - Mayor: Tatiana Badan (Independent)

Population (2014 census)
  - Total: 3,449
- Time zone: UTC+2 (EET)
  - Summer (DST): UTC+3 (EEST)

Selemet is a village in Cimișlia District, Moldova.
