= FC Saksan =

Association football club in Moldova

Saksan
- Full name: Clubul de Fotbal Saksan
- Founded: 2010; 16 years ago as FC Saxan; 2019; 7 years ago as CSCT Saksan; 2023; 3 years ago as FC Saksan; 2026; 0 years ago as CSCT FC Saksan
- Ground: Ceadîr-Lunga Stadium
- Capacity: 2,000

FC Saksan is a Moldovan professional football club based in Ceadîr-Lunga, Gagauzia. They last played in the Liga 1, the second tier of Moldovan football. On 28 May 2025, Saksan promoted to the top tier after a 4–0 victory over Speranis.Two days later they became Politehnica UTM and relocated to Chișinău.On 15 May 2026 they received the license and enrolled for the 2026–27 Moldovan Liga 2 season as CSCT FC Saksan.

== Honours ==
- Divizia A
  - Champions (1): 2013–14
- Divizia B
  - Champions (1): 2010–11

== League history ==
=== Table ===
Season	Division	League							Cup	Notes
Season	Division	Pos.	Pld.	W	D	L	GF	GA	Cup	Notes
2010–11	3rd	1	18	13	1	4	42	19	First round	Promoted
2011–12	2nd	5	30	14	8	8	49	25	Round of 16	
2012–13	2nd	4	28	16	5	7	55	27	Second round	
2013–14	2nd	1	24	18	4	2	66	12	Round of 16	Promoted
2014–15	1st	5	24	8	6	10	20	30	Second round	
2015–16	1st	10	27	1	5	21	10	45	Quarter-final	
2016–17	1st	10	30	5	4	21	23	57	Quarter-final	Relegated
2017	2nd	12	18	4	6	8	19	30	First round	
2018	2nd	6	22	9	3	10	41	31	First round	Expelled
2019	3rd	5	14	5	2	7	27	25	did not enter	
2020–21	3rd	2	22	18	3	1	93	26	First round	
2021–22	3rd	8	22	10	3	9	50	45	Round of 16	Withdrew
2023–24	2nd	3	28	16	7	5	62	29	Round of 16	
2024–25	2nd	2	28	18	6	4	79	26	Quarter-final	Merged

=== European history ===
Season	Competition	Round	Club	Home	Away	Aggregate
2015–16	UEFA Europa League	1Q	(Cyprus) Apollon	0–2	0–2	0–4

Notes

- 1Q: First qualifying round
