= FC Vulturii Cutezători =

Vulturii Cutezători
- Full name: Fotbal Club Vulturii Cutezători
- Short name: Vulturii
- Founded: 2022; 4 years ago
- Ground: Sîngerei Stadium, Sîngerei Moldova
- Capacity: 1,500
- Manager: Dumitru Țurcu
- League: Liga 1
- 2025–26: Liga 2, North Series, 1st of 10 (promoted)

Fotbal Club Vulturii Cutezători, also known as Vulturii Cutezători, or just Vulturii is a Moldovan football club, based in Sîngerei, which competes in Liga 1, the second tier of Moldovan Football.

== History ==
The club was founded in 2022 and enrolled in the Moldovan Liga 2. In the 2023–24 Moldovan Cup, they played until the second round. They eliminated CS Atletic Strășeni, but were eliminated by the South Series Moldovan Liga 2 champions FC Stăuceni, who eliminated CSF Spartanii Sportul 5–1, but were eliminated by current Super Liga champions FC Petrocub Hîncești.

The club was promoted to the Moldovan Liga 1 at the end of the 2023–24 Moldovan Liga 2 season, after winning the North Series, becoming the first club from Sîngerei since FC Sîngerei.

== Honours ==
- Moldovan Liga 2
  - Winners (1): 2023–24
