= Victor Mumjiev Stadium =

Multi-use stadium

- Stadionul „Victor Mumjiev”
- Interactive map of Victor Mumjiev Stadium
- Former names: Stadionul orășenesc
- Address: str. Lenin 15a
- Location: Comrat, Moldova
- Coordinates: 46.323169°N 28.658568°E
- Owner: Comrat
- Capacity: 4,430
- Surface: Artificial Turf
- Field size: 105 by 68 metres (114.8 yd × 74.4 yd)

Construction
- Opened: 2012
- Cost: 10,000,000 €

Tenants
- Maiak Chirsova; Univer Comrat; Olimp Comrat

Stadionul „Victor Mumjiev”, also known as Stadionul Orășenesc, is a football stadium in Comrat, Moldova. It is home of Univer Comrat, Olimp Comrat and Maiak Chirsova.

It was built on the site of a 60-years old football field in 2011–2012 with the funds mostly by the Government of Turkey. The reconstruction cost amounted to 10 million euro. The stadium has a seating capacity of 4,430 with six four-hundred-meter asphalted running tracks and a football field measuring 105 × 68 meters.

The name is given in honor of Viktor Georgievich Mumzhiev, the chairman of the Comrat kolkhoz in the 1950s-1960s, who made a significant contribution to the development of sports in the city.
