= CF Univer Comrat =

Moldovan football club

Univer Comrat
- Full name: Univer Comrat
- Founded: 1996
- Ground: Stadionul Viktor Mumzhiev
- Capacity: 4,000
- Manager: Alexandru Gheorghiev
- League: Liga 1
- 2025–26: Liga 1, Group 2, 3rd of 8
Home colours

Univer Comrat is a Moldovan football club based in Comrat, Moldova. They play in Liga 1, the second tier of Moldovan football.

== History ==
The club has operated under different names throughout its history:

- Universitatea Comrat (1996–2003)
- Gagauziya Comrat (2003–2015)
- Gagauziya-Oguzsport (2015–2016)
- CF Oguzport (2021–2022)
- Univer-Oguzsport (2022–2023)
- Univer Comrat (2023–)

== Honours ==
- Moldovan Liga 2
  - Champions (1): 2022–23
