= Dmitri Maneacov =

Moldovan footballer

Personal information
- Date of birth: 6 March 1992 (age 34)
- Place of birth: Bălți, Moldova
- Position: Forward

Team information
- Current team: Bălți

Senior career*
Years	Team	Apps	(Gls)
2009–2015	Olimpia Bălți	2	(0)
2015–2017	Ungheni	6	(0)
2017	Grănicerul Glodeni	?	(?)
2017–2018	Sîngerei	?	(?)
2018–2019	Speranța Drochia	?	(?)
2019–2020	Spartanii Selemet	?	(?)
2020	Florești	17	(4)
2021	Fălești	?	(?)
2021–2022	Lichtenauer FV	?	(?)
2022–2024	Fălești	1	(1)
2024–2025	Florești		
2025	Speranis Nisporeni		
2025–	Bălți		
- * Club domestic league appearances and goals as of 15 June 2025

Dmitri Maneacov (born 6 March 1992) is a Moldovan footballer who plays as a forward for Moldovan Liga club Bălți.

== Career ==
Maneacov has played in the Moldovan National Division for Olimpia Bălți, Ungheni and Florești.
