= Sîngerei =

Sîngerei Sângerei
- City
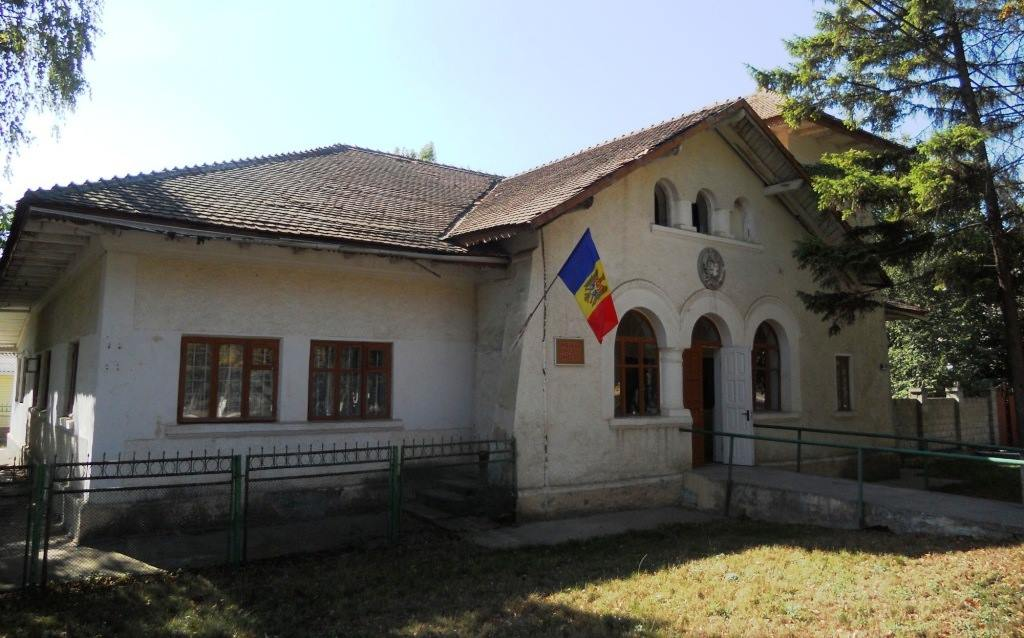

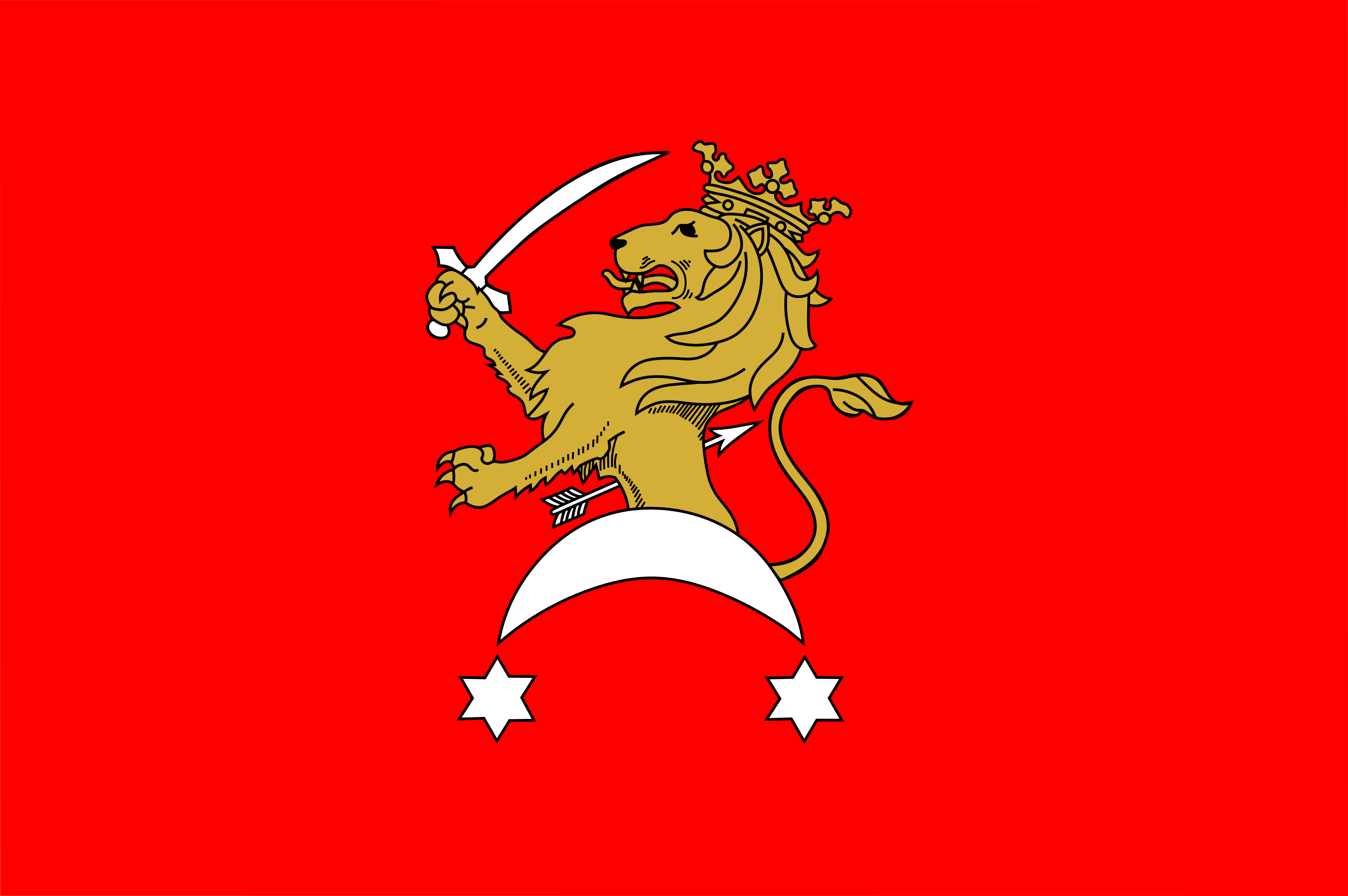
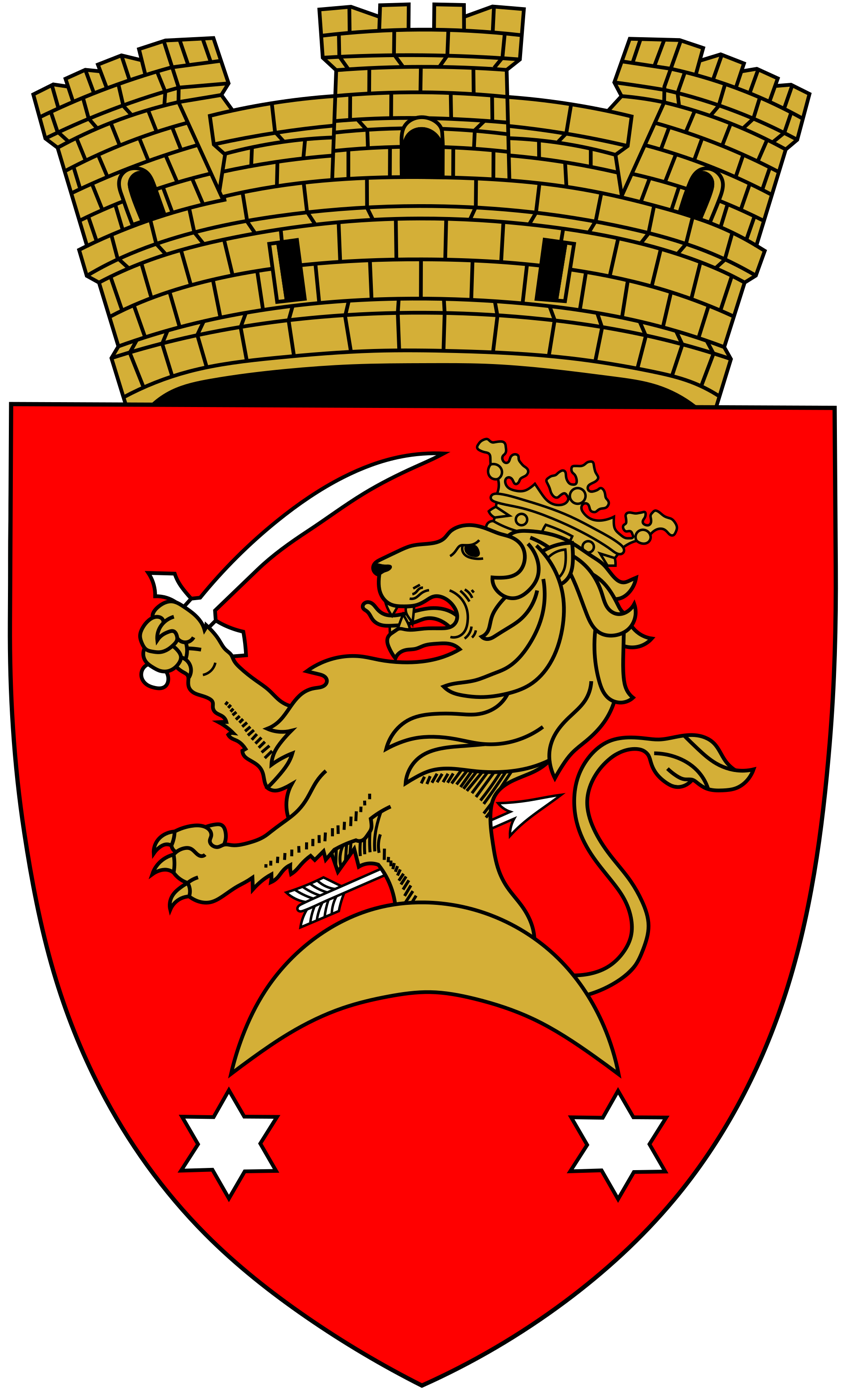
- Flag Coat of arms

- Location in Moldova
- Coordinates: 47°38′N 28°09′E
- Country: Moldova
- District: Sîngerei District

Area
  - Total: 32.3 sq mi (83.7 km^{2})

Population (2014)
  - Total: 12,465
  - Density: 386/sq mi (149/km^{2})
- Time zone: UTC+2 (EET)
  - Summer (DST): UTC+3 (EEST)
- Postal code: MD-6200
- Area code: 262
- Website: www.primariasingerei.md

Sîngerei [sɨndʒerej] (also spelled Sângerei) is a city in Moldova. It is located in the north-central part of the country. It is the largest city and administrative center of Sîngerei District. Spread across an area of 83.7 km^{2} (32.3 sq mi), the town had a population of 12,465 inhabitants in 2014.

== Geography ==
Sîngerei is located in Sîngerei District of Moldova. It is located in the southeastern Europe and in the north-central part of Moldova. Spread across an area of 83.7 km^{2} (32.3 sq mi), it is the largest center of the district. It is one of 27 sub-divisions (two cities and 25 communes) in the district. It is part of the Bessarabia region.

== Demographics ==
According to the 2024 census, 9,954 inhabitants lived in Sîngerei, a decrease compared to the previous census in 2014, when 12,465 inhabitants were registered.

Ethnic composition of Sîngerei (2024)
1. Moldovans (Note: There is an ongoing controversy regarding the ethnic identification of Moldovans and Romanians.) (88.0%)
2. Romanians (8.20%)
3. Ukrainians (2.50%)
4. Russians (0.90%)
5. Others (0.30%)
Linguistic composition of Sîngerei (2024)
1. Moldovan (Note: In March 2023, the Parliament of Moldova passed a law updating all legislative texts and the constitution to refer to the national language as Romanian, effectively rendering the term "Moldovan" obsolete.) (60.4%)
2. Romanian (34.3%)
3. Russian (3.70%)
4. Ukrainian (1.40%)
5. Other (0.10%)

Historical population
Year	Pop.	±%
1930	3,944	—
1970	10,149	+157.3%
1979	12,363	+21.8%
1989	15,023	+21.5%
2004	13,364	−11.0%
2014	12,465	−6.7%
2024	9,954	−20.1%

About 92.5% of the population adhered to Eastern Orthodox Christianity, 5.4% were Baptists, and 2.1% followed other religions or were irreligious.

== Gallery ==
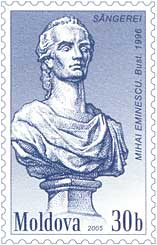
