= FC Zimbru-2 Chișinău =

Moldovan football team

Zimbru-2 Chișinău
- Full name: Fotbal Club Zimbru-2 Chișinău
- Nicknames: Galben-verzii (The Yellow-Greens), Zimbrii
- Ground: Zimbru-2 Stadium
- Capacity: 2,000
- President: Andriy Semenchuk
- Head Coach: Ghenadie Botgros
- League: Liga 1
- 2025–26: Liga 1, Group 2, 5th of 8
- Website: zimbru.md
Home colours	Away colours

FC Zimbru-2 Chișinău is a Moldovan football team, which acts as the reserve side of Zimbru Chișinău. They play in Liga 1, the second tier of Moldovan football.

== Honours ==
- Divizia A

Winners (3): 1998–99, 2005–06, 2006–07

- Divizia B / Liga 2

Winners (2): 1994–95, 2024–25
