= Stăuceni, Chișinău =

City in Chișinău, Moldova

Stăuceni
- City
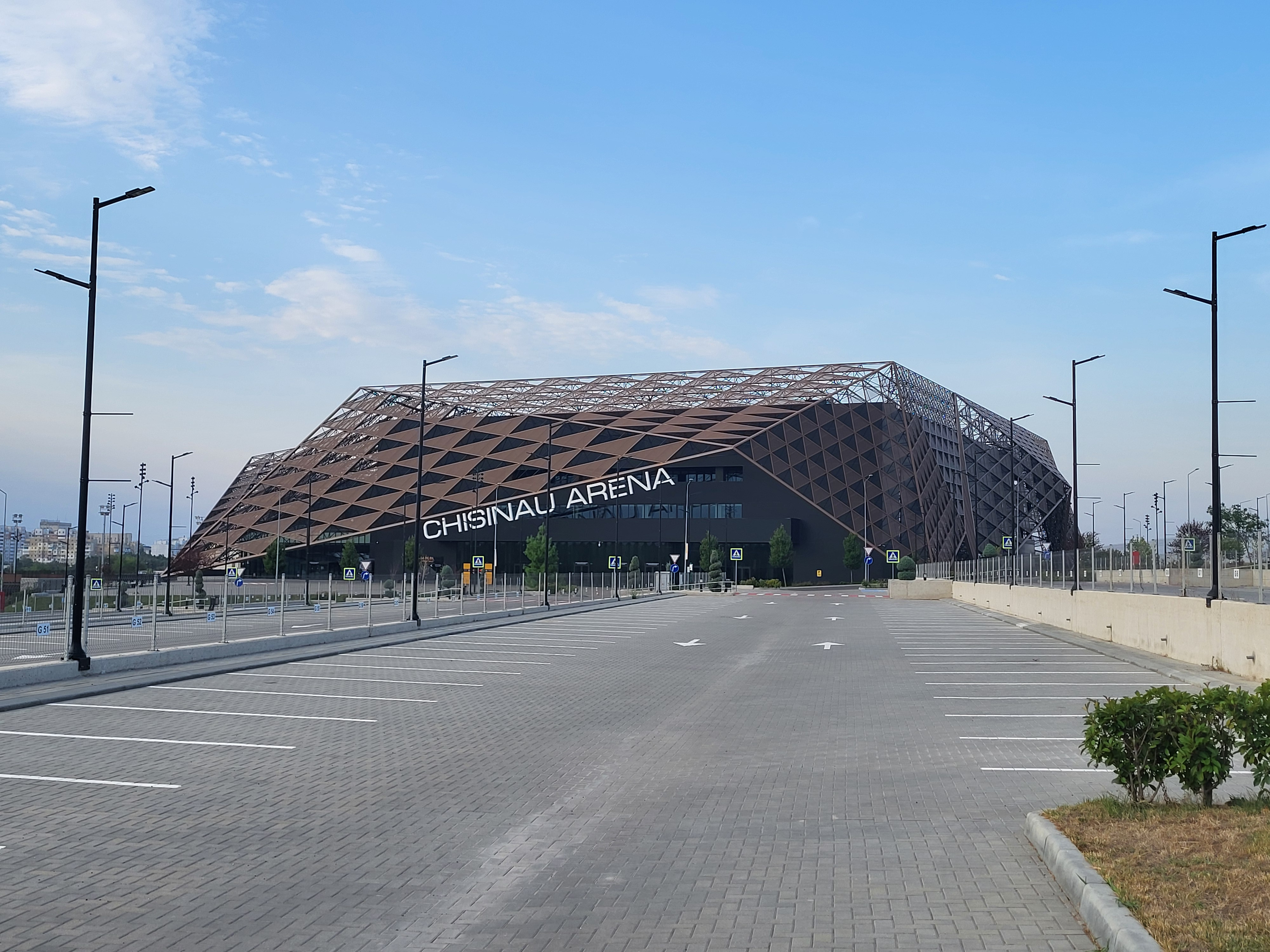
- Arena Chișinău

- Location within Moldova
- Coordinates: 47°05′15″N 28°52′13″E
- Country: Moldova
- County: Chișinău
- Boroughs: List: Goianul Nou

Government
  - Mayor: Alexandru Vornicu (PAS)

Area
  - Total: 14.35 km^{2} (5.54 sq mi)

Population (2024)
  - Total: 11,210
  - Density: 781.2/km^{2} (2,023/sq mi)
- Time zone: UTC+2 (EET)
  - Summer (DST): UTC+3 (EEST)
- Postal code: MD-4839
- Area code: +373 22
- Website: Official website

Stăuceni (Romanian pronunciation: [stəwˈt͡ʃenʲ]) is a town in Chișinău municipality, Moldova, situated on the northern outskirts of Chișinău, less than 10 kilometres (6.2 mi) from the city center. On 16 May 2024, the Parliament of Moldova granted it town status, making it the country’s newest urban center, with the designation taking effect on 21 June 2024.

Stăuceni administratively includes the village of Goianul Nou.

== Viticulture and winemaking ==
Stăuceni is home to the Chișinău Center of Excellence in Viticulture and Winemaking, one of the oldest institutions of its kind in Europe, which has played an important role in developing the wine industry in Moldova and the wider region. Founded in 1842 as the Bessarabian School of Horticulture, it evolved through several stages — including the Medium School of Winemaking (1890), the National School of Viticulture (1922), the State Farm–School of Viticulture and Winemaking (1963), and the National College of Viticulture and Winemaking (1991) — before becoming the Center of Excellence in 2016, celebrating 180 years in 2022. Since 1967, following its merger with the nearby Grătiești sovkhoz to form the farm–school, the institution has been based in Stăuceni, and during the 1970s, residential buildings — including two dormitories and two five-story blocks — were constructed, along with supporting infrastructure for the school and its community.

The area is a prominent viticultural region, with locally grown grape varieties including Aligote, Fetească, Rkatsiteli, Sauvignon blanc, Cabernet Sauvignon, Merlot, and Pinot noir, as well as several varieties used for table grapes. Indigenous varieties include Plăvaie.

== Entertainment ==
Arena Chișinău, an indoor sporting venue inaugurated in 2022, is located in the southern part of Stăuceni. The government has announced plans to build a new national stadium nearby, with a capacity of 20,000–25,000 spectators and an estimated cost of €85 million, expected to meet the highest UEFA standards.

== Demographics ==
According to the 2024 census, Stăuceni had 11,210 inhabitants, an increase compared to the previous census in 2014, when 8,694 inhabitants were registered.

Ethnic composition of Stăuceni (2024)
1. Moldovans (Note: There is an ongoing controversy regarding the ethnic identification of Moldovans and Romanians.) (71.4%)
2. Romanians (21.7%)
3. Ukrainians (3.40%)
4. Russians (1.70%)
5. Others (1.50%)
6. Not stated (0.20%)
Linguistic composition of Stăuceni (2024)
1. Romanian (64.1%)
2. Moldovan (Note: In March 2023, the Parliament of Moldova passed a law updating all legislative texts and the constitution to refer to the national language as Romanian, effectively rendering the term "Moldovan" obsolete.) (24.9%)
3. Russian (8.70%)
4. Ukrainian (1.60%)
5. Other (0.70%)

Historical population
Year	Pop.	±%
2004	6,204	—
2014	8,694	+40.1%
2024	11,210	+28.9%
