= FC Iskra Rîbnița =

Moldovan football club

Iskra
- Full name: Fotbal Club Iskra
- Founded: 2013
- Ground: Real Succes (Chișinău)
- Capacity: 150
- President: Anatolie Cebotari
- Head Coach: Ilie Pinteac
- League: Liga 1
- 2025–26: Liga 1, Group 1, 5th of 6

FC Iskra Rîbnița is a Moldovan football club with its legal address in Păpăuți.The team currently competes in Liga 1, the second tier of Moldovan football, and plays its home matches at the Real Succes Stadium in Chișinău.

== History ==
SS-2 Narubai entered the 2012–13 Moldovan "B" Division. In 2013, Iskra-Stal, a local team from Rîbnița, ceased to exist, and shortly thereafter SS-2 Narubai changed its name to Iskra and joined the 2013–14 Moldovan "B" Division season.From 28 June 2022, the club refounded and has moved its legal address to Păpăuți.However, they continued to play in Rîbnița until May 2026. Starting in August 2026, they host home matches in Chișinău at Real Succes Stadium.

== Honours ==
- Moldovan Liga 2
  - Winners (1): 2022–23
