= 2018–19 Moldovan Cup =

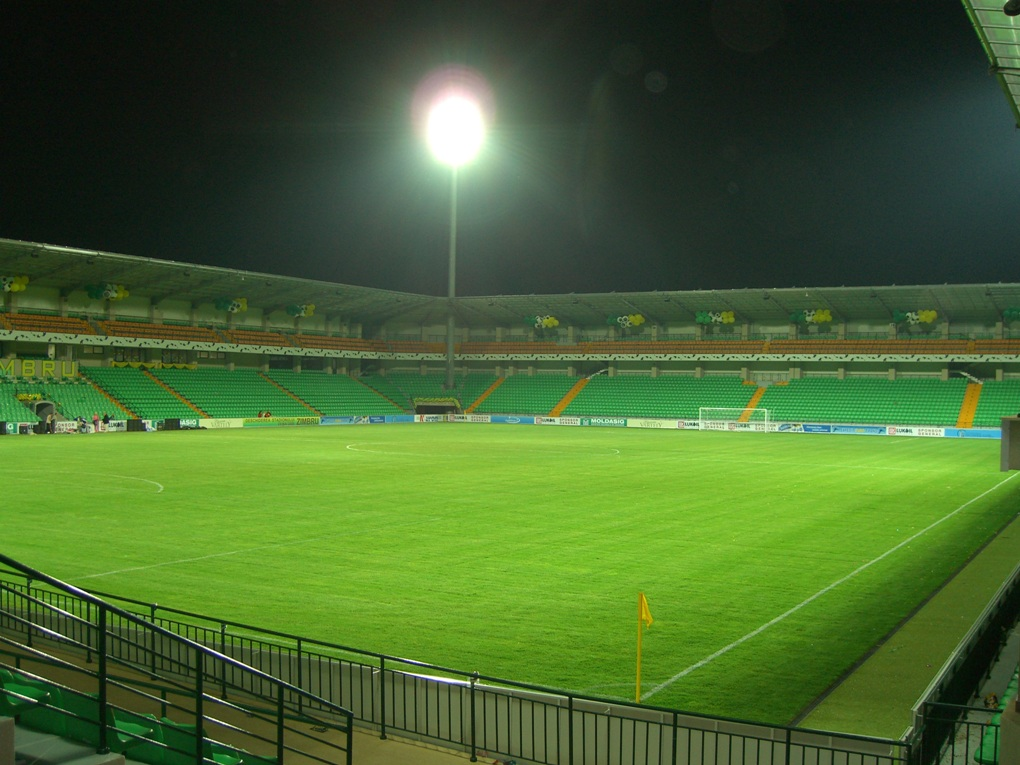
- Zimbru Stadium in Chișinău hosted the final

Tournament details
- Country: Moldova
- Dates: 12 May 2018 – 22 May 2019
- Teams: 47

Final positions
- Champions: Sheriff Tiraspol
- Runners-up: Sfîntul Gheorghe

Tournament statistics
- Matches played: 59
- Goals scored: 230 (3.9 per match)

The 2018–19 Moldovan Cup (Romanian: Cupa Moldovei) was the 28th season of the annual Moldovan football cup competition. It began with the preliminary round on 12 May 2018, and concluded with the final on 22 May 2019. Milsami Orhei were the defending champions.

== Format and Schedule ==
The preliminary round and the first two rounds proper are regionalised to reduce teams travel costs.

Round	Match dates	Fixtures	Clubs
Preliminary Round	12 May 2018	7	47 → 40
First round	25–26 May 2018	16	40 → 24
Second round	9 June 2018	8	24 → 16
Round of 16	20 June 2018 (1st leg); 5–7 July 2018 (2nd leg)	16	16 → 8
Quarter-Finals	26 September 2018 (1st leg); 31 October 2018 (2nd leg)	8	8 → 4
Semi-Finals	16–17 April 2019 (1st leg); 7–8 May 2019 (2nd leg)	4	4 → 2
Final	22 May 2019	1	2 → 1

== Participating teams ==
The following teams entered the competition:

**Divizia Națională** the 8 teams of the 2018 season	**Divizia A** the 12 teams of the 2018 season	**Divizia B** the 27 teams of the 2018 season
Milsami Orhei ^{title holder}; Zimbru Chișinău ^{runner-up}; Sheriff Tiraspol; Petrocub-Hîncești; Zaria Bălți; Speranța Nisporeni; Sfîntul Gheorghe; Dinamo-Auto	Victoria Chișinău; Grănicerul Glodeni; Sîngerei; Cahul-2005; Iskra Rîbnița; Real Succes; Ungheni; Codru Lozova; Saxan; Sireți; Florești; Sparta Chișinău	Edineț; Tighina; Soroca; Fortuna Pleșeni; Intersport Sănătăuca; FCM Ungheni; Bogzești; Olimp Comrat; Fulger Ialoveni; Speranța Drochia; Maiak Chirsova; Maiac Cioropcani; Congaz; Codru-Juniori; Cricova; Slobozia Mare; Rîșcani; Sinteza Căușeni; Cruiz Camenca; Dacia Buiucani; Flacăra Mingir; ISM-2017; Rezina; Spartanii Selemet; Sporting Natalievca; Sucleia; Trachia Taraclia

Number in brackets denote the level of respective league in Football in Moldova. Teams in bold continue to the next round of the competition.

== Preliminary round ==
14 clubs from the Divizia B entered this round. Teams that finished higher on the league in the previous season played their ties away. 13 clubs from the Divizia B received a bye for the preliminary round. Matches were played on 12 May 2018.

12 May 2018	Cruiz Camenca (3)	3–4	Rezina (3)	Camenca
17:00 EEST				Stadium: Stadionul Orășenesc; Referee: Ghenadie Sidenco

12 May 2018	Sporting Natalievca (3)	2–3	Speranța Drochia (3)	Fălești
17:00 EEST				Stadium: Stadionul Orășenesc; Referee: Alexandru Stefciuc

12 May 2018	Codru-Juniori (3)	2–2 (a.e.t.) (3–5 p)	FCM Ungheni (3)	Călărași
17:00 EEST				Stadium: Stadionul Orășenesc; Referee: Serghei Derenov

12 May 2018	Sucleia (3)	2–1	Sinteza Căușeni (3)	Căușeni
17:00 EEST				Stadium: Stadionul Orășenesc; Referee: Iurie Covtun

12 May 2018	ISM-2017 (3)	0–3	Tighina (3)	Grigoriopol
17:00 EEST				Stadium: Stadionul Orășenesc; Referee: Petru Stoianov

12 May 2018	Trachia Taraclia (3)	0–2	Slobozia Mare (3)	Taraclia
17:00 EEST				Stadium: Stadionul Orășenesc; Referee: Andrei Diordiev

12 May 2018	Flacăra Mingir (3)	2–0	Congaz (3)	Mingir
17:00 EEST				Stadium: Stadionul Sătesc; Referee: Denis Ivlev

== First round ==
20 clubs from the Divizia B and 12 clubs from the Divizia A entered this round. In a match, the home advantage was granted to the team from the lower league. If two teams are from the same division, the team that finished higher on the league in the previous season played their tie away. Matches were played on 25 and 26 May 2018.

25 May 2018	Fulger Ialoveni (3)	3–2	Real Succes (2)	Chișinău
17:00 EEST				Stadium: Real Succes; Referee: Igor Boșca

26 May 2018	Maiac Cioropcani (3)	0–4	Grănicerul Glodeni (2)	Cioropcani
17:00 EEST				Stadium: Stadionul Sătesc; Referee: Veaceslav Morgun

26 May 2018	Intersport Sănătăuca (3)	1–2	Soroca (3)	Sănătăuca
17:00 EEST				Stadium: Stadionul Sătesc; Referee: Serghei Derenov

26 May 2018	Rîșcani (3)	2–4	Edineț (3)	Rîșcani
17:00 EEST				Stadium: Stadionul Orășenesc; Referee: Dmitri Martîniuc

26 May 2018	Cricova (3)	1–6	Florești (2)	Cricova
17:00 EEST				Stadium: Stadionul Orășenesc; Referee: Grigore Vorfolomei

26 May 2018	Bogzești (3)	3–1	Ungheni (2)	Telenești
17:00 EEST				Stadium: Stadionul Orășenesc; Referee: Ghenadie Sidenco

26 May 2018	Rezina (3)	0–2	Iskra Rîbnița (2)	Rîbnița
17:00 EEST				Stadium: Stadionul Orășenesc; Referee: Andrei Ghetmanciuc

26 May 2018	Speranța Drochia (3)	1–0	Sîngerei (2)	Drochia
17:00 EEST				Stadium: Stadionul Orășenesc; Referee: Valerii Minciuna

26 May 2018	FCM Ungheni (3)	1–3	Codru Lozova (2)	Ungheni
17:00 EEST				Stadium: Ungheni Stadium; Referee: Ion Orlic

26 May 2018	Sucleia (3)	1–3	Sparta Chișinău (2)	Tiraspol
17:00 EEST				Stadium: Stadionul Municipal; Referee: Radu Tobultoc

26 May 2018	Tighina (3)	1–0 (a.e.t.)	Sireți (2)	Bender
17:00 EEST				Stadium: Stadionul Șelcovic; Referee: Denis Ivlev

26 May 2018	Slobozia Mare (3)	1–4	Cahul-2005 (2)	Slobozia Mare
17:00 EEST				Stadium: Stadionul Sătesc; Referee: Andrei Breguța

26 May 2018	Flacăra Mingir (3)	3–0	Saxan (2)	Mingir
17:00 EEST				Stadium: Stadionul Sătesc; Referee: Andrei Cojocaru

26 May 2018	Spartanii Selemet (3)	4–0	Olimp Comrat (3)	Comrat
17:00 EEST				Stadium: Comrat Stadium; Referee: Vitalie Cobzac

26 May 2018	Maiak Chirsova (3)	0–0 (a.e.t.) (4–3 p)	Fortuna Pleșeni (3)	Chirsova
17:00 EEST				Stadium: Stadionul Sătesc; Referee: Iurie Covtun

26 May 2018	Dacia Buiucani (3)	3–4	Victoria Chișinău (2)	Chișinău
17:30 EEST				Stadium: Joma Arena; Referee: Dumitru Muntean

== Second round ==
The 16 winners from the previous round entered this round. In a match, the home advantage was granted to the team from the lower league. If two teams are from the same division, the team that finished higher on the league in the previous season played their tie away. Matches were played on 9 June 2018.

9 June 2018	Soroca (3)	3–5	Grănicerul Glodeni (2)	Soroca
17:30 EEST	N. Ursu 16'; D. Cananău 78' (pen.); I. Antonov 88'		A. Drab 36', 65'; Boghiu 54'; V. Noroc 59'; V. Grijuc 72'	Stadium: Stadionul Orășenesc; Referee: Serghei Derenov

9 June 2018	Edineț (3)	0–1	Florești (2)	Edineț
17:30 EEST			G. Ploniș 20'	Stadium: Stadionul Orășenesc; Referee: Alexandru Stefciuc

9 June 2018	Bogzești (3)	w/o	Iskra Rîbnița (2)	Telenești
17:30 EEST				Stadium: Stadionul Orășenesc; Referee: Valerii Minciuna

9 June 2018	Speranța Drochia (3)	0–2	Codru Lozova (2)	Drochia
17:30 EEST			D. Adam 39'; Răilean 57'	Stadium: Stadionul Orășenesc; Referee: Veaceslav Morgun

9 June 2018	Tighina (3)	0–3	Sparta Chișinău (2)	Bender
17:30 EEST			G. Cojocari 45'; A. Apostol 65'; M. Buruiană 74'	Stadium: Stadionul Șelcovic; Referee: Ion Bilea

9 June 2018	Flacăra Mingir (3)	0–2	Cahul-2005 (2)	Mingir
17:30 EEST			A. Carastoian 30'; E. Culivschii 85'	Stadium: Stadionul Sătesc; Referee: Denis Ivlev

9 June 2018	Fulger Ialoveni (3)	2–3	Victoria Chișinău (2)	Ialoveni
17:30 EEST				Stadium: Stadionul Orășenesc; Referee: Andrei Ghetmanciuc

9 June 2018	Spartanii Selemet (3)	3–0	Maiak Chirsova (3)	Selemet
17:30 EEST	V. Iordachi 3', 56'; Sofroni 86'			Stadium: Stadionul Sătesc; Referee: Andrei Breguța

== Final stage ==
=== Bracket ===
Round of 16
Sheriff Tiraspol	7	9	16
Iskra Rîbnița	0	1	1
Speranța Nisporeni (a)	0	2	2
Codru Lozova	1	1	2
Petrocub-Hîncești	10	6	16
Florești	2	1	3
Grănicerul Glodeni	0	2	2
Milsami Orhei	2	4	6
Victoria Chișinău	1	1	2
Zaria Bălți	4	4	8
Zimbru Chișinău	0	4	4
Spartanii Selemet	0	1	1
Cahul-2005	1	0	1
Dinamo-Auto	0	5	5
Sfîntul Gheorghe	7	3	10
Sparta Chișinău	2	3	5

Quarter-finals
Sheriff Tiraspol	3	3	6
Speranța Nisporeni	0	0	0
Petrocub-Hîncești	0	1	1
Milsami Orhei	2	0	2
Zaria Bălți	3	1	4
Zimbru Chișinău	2	7	9
Dinamo-Auto	0	2	2
Sfîntul Gheorghe	3	1	4

Semi-finals
Sheriff Tiraspol	2	0	2
Milsami Orhei	0	0	0
Zimbru Chișinău	0	1	1
Sfîntul Gheorghe	1	3	4

Final
Sheriff Tiraspol (a.e.t.)	1
Sfîntul Gheorghe	0

== Round of 16 ==
The 8 winners from the previous round and 8 clubs from the Divizia Națională entered this round. The home teams in the first legs and the pairs were determined in a draw held on 13 June 2018. The first legs were played on 20 June 2018 and the second legs on 5,6 and 7 July 2018.

Team 1	Agg.	Team 2	1st leg	2nd leg
Grănicerul Glodeni	2–6	Milsami Orhei	0–2	2–4
Petrocub-Hîncești	16–3	Florești	10–2	6–1
Sheriff Tiraspol	16–1	Iskra Rîbnița	7–0	9–1
Speranța Nisporeni	2–2 (a)	Codru Lozova	0–1	2–1
Sfîntul Gheorghe	10–5	Sparta Chișinău	7–2	3–3
Cahul-2005	1–5	Dinamo-Auto	1–0	0–5
Victoria Chișinău	2–8	Zaria Bălți	1–4	1–4
Zimbru Chișinău	4–1	Spartanii Selemet	0–0	4–1

=== First leg ===
20 June 2018	Grănicerul Glodeni (2)	0–2	Milsami Orhei (1)	Glodeni
18:30 EEST		Report	M. Antoniuc 36'; Bugaiov 76'	Stadium: Stadionul Orășenesc; Attendance: 400; Referee: Ghenadie Sidenco

20 June 2018	Speranța Nisporeni (1)	0–1	Codru Lozova (2)	Orhei
18:30 EEST		Report	D. Adam 14'	Stadium: CSR; Attendance: 100; Referee: Vladislav Ivancenco

20 June 2018	Sfîntul Gheorghe (1)	7–2	Sparta Chișinău (2)	Suruceni
18:30 EEST	Maxim 24', 45+1'; Istrati 31', 84'; Ghecev 54'; D. Gheiceanu 62'; Erhan 90+3'	Report	M. Buruiană 8'; A. Apostol 42'	Stadium: Suruceni Stadium; Attendance: 150; Referee: Ruslan Muntean

20 June 2018	Cahul-2005 (2)	1–0	Dinamo-Auto (1)	Cahul
18:30 EEST	E. Culivschii 14'	Report		Stadium: Stadionul Atlant; Attendance: 400; Referee: Andrei Breguța

20 June 2018	Victoria Chișinău (2)	1–4	Zaria Bălți (1)	Chișinău
18:30 EEST	D. Cemschi 59' (o.g.)	Report	Văluță 4' (o.g.); D. Semirov 21'; Yermak 25' (pen.); D. Rogac 57'	Stadium: Real Succes; Attendance: 50; Referee: Valerii Minciuna

20 June 2018	Sheriff Tiraspol (1)	7–0	Iskra Rîbnița (2)	Tiraspol
19:00 EEST	Cobeț 35', 53', 71'; Gerson 38'; Badibanga 75'; Kamara 88', 90+1'	Report		Stadium: Sheriff-2 Stadium; Attendance: 450; Referee: Andrei Diordiev

20 June 2018	Zimbru Chișinău (1)	0–0	Spartanii Selemet (3)	Chișinău
19:00 EEST		Report		Stadium: Zimbru Stadium; Attendance: 150; Referee: Ion Orlic

20 June 2018	Petrocub-Hîncești (1)	10–2	Florești (2)	Hîncești
20:00 EEST	Puntus 12', 59', 79'; D. Taras 18'; Paireli 20'; V. Ambros 49'; Mudrac 56'; Ivanov 62'; Onana 74'; A. Macrițchii 89'	Report	Al. Popovici 71'; I. Bîcicov 85'	Stadium: Stadionul Municipal; Attendance: 400; Referee: Dumitru Muntean

=== Second leg ===
5 July 2018	Iskra Rîbnița (2)	1–9 (1–16 agg.)	Sheriff Tiraspol (1)	Rîbnița
17:30 EEST	I. Carandașov 50'	Report	Belousov 10', 79'; Gerson 12', 27'; Jô Santos 55', 56'; Boiciuc 63'; Kapić 71'; Cobeț 90+1'	Stadium: Stadionul Orășenesc; Attendance: 400; Referee: Ion Bilea

5 July 2018	Milsami Orhei (1)	4–2 (6–2 agg.)	Grănicerul Glodeni (2)	Orhei
20:00 EEST	O. Andronic 13', 37'; S. Plătică 21'; Ibrian 35'	Report	V. Cheptenari 27'; A. Drab 90'	Stadium: CSR; Attendance: 500; Referee: Gabriel Tupicica

6 July 2018	Florești (2)	1–6 (3–16 agg.)	Petrocub-Hîncești (1)	Izvoare
17:30 EEST	G. Ploniș 78'	Report	Pătraș 5'; Vremea 17'; Cojocaru 35'; Melachio 52'; Pîslă 59', 89'	Stadium: Stadionul Sătesc; Attendance: 200; Referee: Daniel Luca

6 July 2018	Zaria Bălți (1)	4–1 (8–2 agg.)	Victoria Chișinău (2)	Bălți
17:30 EEST	Gulceac 74'; R. Bostan 76'; Conrado 79'; Alexeev 85'	Report	I. Bîcicov 38'	Stadium: Stadionul Orășenesc; Attendance: 500; Referee: Andrei Breguța

7 July 2018	Codru Lozova (2)	1–2 (2–2 a agg.)	Speranța Nisporeni (1)	Ghidighici
17:30 EEST	I. Mamaliga 50'	Report	M. Bolun 75'; Iurcu 90+1' (pen.)	Stadium: Ghidighici Stadium; Attendance: 100; Referee: Dumitru Muntean

7 July 2018	Sparta Chișinău (2)	3–3 (5–10 agg.)	Sfîntul Gheorghe (1)	Chișinău
17:30 EEST	F. Cheltuitor 56'; V. Mereacre 67'; S. Rusu 86'	Report	Suvorov 36'; Agnero 75'; D. Gheiceanu 77'	Stadium: Real Succes; Attendance: 100; Referee: Nicolae Murzac

7 July 2018	Dinamo-Auto (1)	5–0 (5–1 agg.)	Cahul-2005 (2)	Tîrnauca
17:30 EEST	Truhanov 6'; N. Capraru 30' (o.g.); Rebenja 36', 81'; Boychuk 69'	Report		Stadium: Dinamo-Auto; Attendance: 50; Referee: Alexandru Tean

7 July 2018	Spartanii Selemet (3)	1–4 (1–4 agg.)	Zimbru Chișinău (1)	Selemet
17:30 EEST	S. Cușciac 67' (pen.)	Report	Stînă 33' (pen.); Yaméogo 37', 39'; Nicolaescu 50'	Stadium: Stadionul Sătesc; Attendance: 500; Referee: Veaceslav Banari

== Quarter-finals ==
The 8 winners from the previous round entered the quarter-finals. The home teams in the first legs were determined in a draw held on 16 July 2018. The first legs were played on 26 September 2018 and the second legs on 31 October 2018.

Team 1	Agg.	Team 2	1st leg	2nd leg
Petrocub-Hîncești	1–2	Milsami Orhei	0–2	1–0
Sheriff Tiraspol	6–0	Speranța Nisporeni	3–0	3–0
Dinamo-Auto	2–4	Sfîntul Gheorghe	0–3	2–1
Zaria Bălți	4–9	Zimbru Chișinău	3–2	1–7

=== First leg ===
26 September 2018	Dinamo-Auto (1)	0–3	Sfîntul Gheorghe (1)	Tîrnauca
15:30 EEST		Report	Urvanțev 28'; Molla 42', 69'	Stadium: Dinamo-Auto; Attendance: 50; Referee: Gabriel Tupicica

26 September 2018	Zaria Bălți (1)	3–2	Zimbru Chișinău (1)	Orhei
15:30 EEST	Gulceac 73'; Ovseanicov 79'; Yermak 90+4' (pen.)	Report	Teixeira 14'; Cassius 90'	Stadium: CSR; Attendance: 100; Referee: Iurie Covtun

26 September 2018	Sheriff Tiraspol (1)	3–0	Speranța Nisporeni (1)	Tiraspol
18:00 EEST	Balima 21', 45'; Anton 56'	Report		Stadium: Sheriff-2 Stadium; Attendance: 1,500; Referee: Andrei Breguța

26 September 2018	Petrocub-Hîncești (1)	0–2	Milsami Orhei (1)	Hîncești
18:30 EEST		Report	V. Jardan 3'; M. Plătică 82'	Stadium: Stadionul Municipal; Attendance: 700; Referee: Alexandru Tean

=== Second leg ===
31 October 2018	Speranța Nisporeni (1)	0–3 (0–6 agg.)	Sheriff Tiraspol (1)	Ghidighici
13:00 EET		Report	Balima 56'; Kulušić 60'; Kovačević 82'	Stadium: Ghidighici Stadium; Attendance: 100; Referee: Daniel Luca

31 October 2018	Sfîntul Gheorghe (1)	1–2 (4–2 agg.)	Dinamo-Auto (1)	Suruceni
13:00 EET	Istrati 21'	Report	Rebenja 25'; Cheptine 61'	Stadium: Suruceni Stadium; Attendance: 100; Referee: Petru Stoianov

31 October 2018	Zimbru Chișinău (1)	7–1 (9–4 agg.)	Zaria Bălți (1)	Chișinău
13:00 EET	Teixeira 21' (pen.), 74'; Țîgîrlaș 26'; Obekop 36'; Semedo 54'; Scoarță 67', 86'	Report	Patric 69'	Stadium: Zimbru-2; Attendance: 300; Referee: Veaceslav Banari

31 October 2018	Milsami Orhei (1)	0–1 (2–1 agg.)	Petrocub-Hîncești (1)	Orhei
18:00 EET		Report	Melachio 68'	Stadium: CSR; Attendance: 500; Referee: Vladislav Ivancenco

== Semi-finals ==
The 4 winners from the previous round entered the semi-finals. The home teams in the first legs were determined in a draw held on 4 December 2018. The first legs were played on 16 and 17 April 2019 and the second legs on 7 and 8 May 2019.

Team 1	Agg.	Team 2	1st leg	2nd leg
Sheriff Tiraspol	2–0	Milsami Orhei	2–0	0–0
Zimbru Chișinău	1–4	Sfîntul Gheorghe	0–1	1–3

=== First leg ===
16 April 2019	Sheriff Tiraspol (1)	2–0	Milsami Orhei (1)	Tiraspol
18:00 EEST	Tambe 79', 84'	Report		Stadium: Sheriff Stadium; Attendance: 500; Referee: Gabriel Tupicica

17 April 2019	Zimbru Chișinău (1)	0–1	Sfîntul Gheorghe (1)	Chișinău
19:00 EEST		Report	Istrati 9'	Stadium: Zimbru Stadium; Attendance: 300; Referee: Alexandru Tean

=== Second leg ===
7 May 2019	Milsami Orhei (1)	0–0 (0–2 agg.)	Sheriff Tiraspol (1)	Orhei
18:00 EEST		Report		Stadium: CSR; Attendance: 960; Referee: Vladislav Ivancenco

8 May 2019	Sfîntul Gheorghe (1)	3–1 (4–1 agg.)	Zimbru Chișinău (1)	Suruceni
15:00 EEST	Kirakosyan 30'; Boiciuc 56'; Novicov 84'	Report	Cojocari 52' (pen.)	Stadium: Suruceni Stadium; Attendance: 100; Referee: Dumitru Muntean

== Final ==
The final was played on Wednesday 22 May 2019 at the Zimbru Stadium in Chișinău. The "home" team (for administrative purposes) was determined by an additional draw held on 9 May 2019.

22 May 2019
20:30 EEST

Sheriff Tiraspol	1–0 (a.e.t.)	Sfîntul Gheorghe
Leandro 92'	Report

Zimbru Stadium, Chișinău
Attendance: 5,250
Referee: István Kovács (Romania)

Sheriff	Sf. Gheorghe

GK	20	(Croatia) Zvonimir Mikulić
DF	15	(Brazil) Cris Silva
DF	23	(Serbia) Vladimir Kovačević
DF	55	(Bosnia and Herzegovina) Mateo Sušić
DF	90	(Moldova) Veaceslav Posmac (c)
MF	8	(Moldova) Mihail Ghecev	(yellow card) 77'
MF	10	(Spain) José Ángel		(substituted off) 70'
MF	17	(Moldova) Alexandr Belousov
MF	18	(Moldova) Gheorghe Anton
MF	32	(Moldova) Evgheni Oancea		(substituted off) 46'
FW	24	(Moldova) Evghenii Berco		(substituted off) 46'
Substitutes:
GK	1	(Moldova) Dumitru Celeadnic
DF	6	(Poland) Jarosław Jach		(substituted on) 117'
DF	14	(Burkina Faso) Benjamin Balima
DF	22	(Moldova) Vadim Dijinari
MF	19	(Croatia) Antun Palić		(substituted on) 46'
MF	77	(Belarus) Yury Kendysh	(yellow card) 99'	(substituted on) 70'
FW	70	(Brazil) Leandro		(substituted on) 46'	(substituted off) 117'
Head Coach:
(Croatia) Zoran Zekić

GK	28	(Moldova) Nicolae Cebotari
DF	3	(Moldova) Maxim Focșa	(yellow card) 108'
DF	4	(Moldova) Andrei Novicov
DF	17	(Moldova) Petru Ojog
DF	19	(Moldova) Serghei Svinarenco	(yellow card) 45'	(substituted off) 90'
MF	7	(Moldova) Alexandru Suvorov (c)
MF	11	(Armenia) Garegin Kirakosyan		(substituted off) 81'
MF	21	(Moldova) Eugen Slivca		(substituted off) 53'
MF	97	(Moldova) Artiom Rozgoniuc	(yellow card) 108'
FW	9	(Moldova) Alexandru Boiciuc
FW	10	(Moldova) Sergiu Istrati		(substituted off) 97'
Substitutes:
GK	25	(Moldova) Dmitrii Burac
DF	15	(Moldova) Victor Martin
DF	16	(Ukraine) Myroslav Mazur
DF	24	(Moldova) Vladimir Ghinaitis		(substituted on) 90'
MF	5	(Moldova) Vitalie Plămădeală		(substituted on) 53'
MF	22	(Moldova) Dmitri Mandrîcenco		(substituted on) 97'
MF	99	(Moldova) Artiom Carastoian		(substituted on) 81'
Head Coach:
(Moldova) Serghei Cebotari

Assistant referees:
Vasile Marinescu (Romania)
Ovidiu Artene (Romania)
Fourth official:
Alexandru Tean (Moldova)

Match rules

- 90 minutes.
- 30 minutes of extra time if necessary.
- Penalty shoot-out if score is still level.
- Seven named substitutes.
- Maximum of three substitutions, with a fourth allowed in extra time.
