= 2019–20 Moldovan Cup =

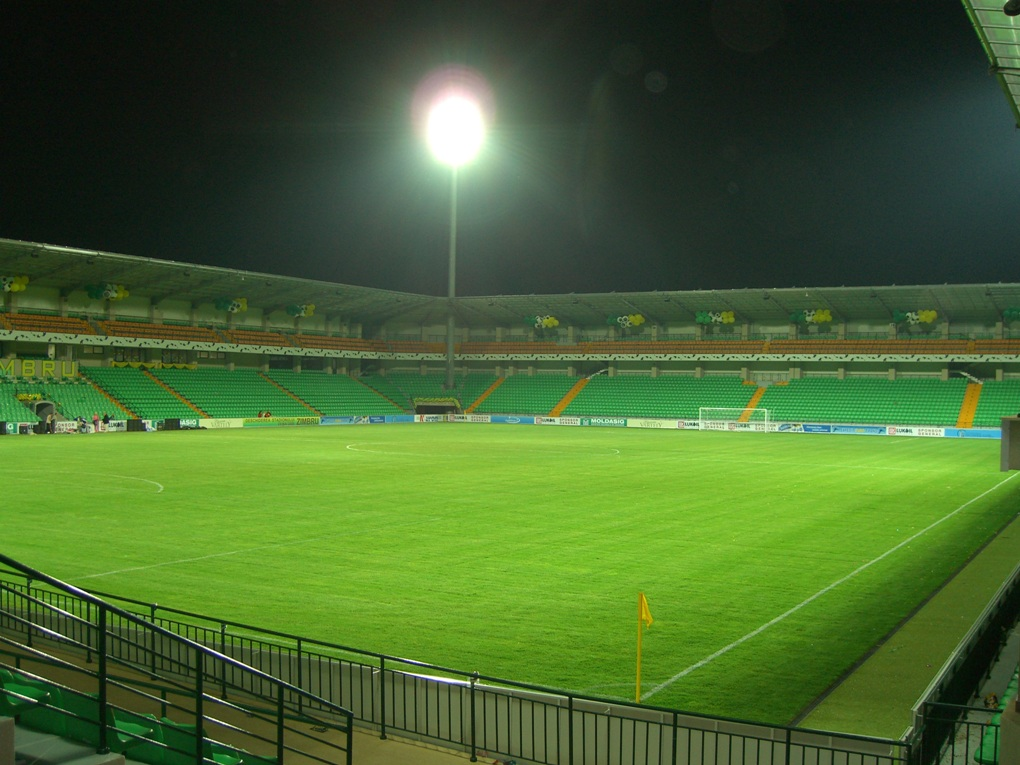
- Zimbru Stadium in Chișinău hosted the final

Tournament details
- Country: Moldova
- Dates: 20 April 2019 – 30 June 2020
- Teams: 49

Final positions
- Champions: Petrocub-Hîncești
- Runners-up: Sfîntul Gheorghe

Tournament statistics
- Matches played: 62
- Goals scored: 253 (4.08 per match)

The 2019–20 Moldovan Cup (Romanian: Cupa Moldovei) was the 29th season of the annual Moldovan football cup competition. The competition started on 20 April 2019 with the preliminary round and concluded with the final on 30 June 2020. The winner qualifies for the first qualifying round of the 2020–21 UEFA Europa League.

== Format and Schedule ==
The preliminary round and the first two rounds proper are regionalised to reduce teams travel costs.

Round	Match dates	Fixtures	Clubs
Preliminary Round	20 April 2019	9	49 → 40
First Round	3–4 May 2019	16	40 → 24
Second Round	24–25 May 2019	8	24 → 16
Round of 16	25–26 June 2019 (1st leg); 5–7 July 2019 (2nd leg)	16	16 → 8
Quarter-Finals	24–25 September 2019 (1st leg); 29–30 October 2019 (2nd leg)	8	8 → 4
Semi-Finals	21–22 June 2020 (1st leg); 25 June 2020 (2nd leg)	4	4 → 2
Final	30 June 2020	1	2 → 1

== Participating clubs ==
The following teams entered the competition:

Divizia Națională the 8 teams of the 2019 season	Divizia A the 15 teams of the 2019 season	Divizia B the 26 teams of the 2019 season
Sheriff Tiraspol ^{title holder}; Sfîntul Gheorghe ^{runner-up}; Milsami Orhei; Petrocub-Hîncești; Speranța Nisporeni; Zimbru Chișinău; Dinamo-Auto; Codru Lozova	Zaria Bălți; Florești; Sîngerei; Victoria Chișinău; Grănicerul Glodeni; Ungheni; Cahul-2005; Sireți; Real Succes; Sparta Chișinău; Iskra Rîbnița; Speranța Drochia; Tighina; Spartanii Selemet; Dacia Buiucani	Inter Soroca; Fortuna Pleșeni; Edineț; FCM Ungheni; Olimp Comrat; Sucleia; Maiak Chirsova; Flacăra Mingir; Rîșcani; Bogzești; Congaz; Rezina; Sinteza Căușeni; Intersport Sănătăuca; Codru-Juniori; Cruiz Plus; Slobozia Mare; Sporting Natalievca; Cricova; Fulger Ialoveni; Academia Viitorul; Fălești; ARF Ialoveni; Pepeni; Sporting Trestieni; Văsieni

== Preliminary round ==
18 clubs from the Divizia B entered this round. Teams that finished higher on the league in the previous season played their ties away. 8 clubs from the Divizia B received a bye for the preliminary round. Matches were played on 20 April 2019.

20 April 2019	Pepeni (3)	3–1	Rezina (3)	Pepeni
15:00 EEST				Stadium: Pepeni Stadium; Referee: Andrei Cuziac

20 April 2019	Fălești (3)	2–1	Sporting Natalievca (3)	Fălești
15:00 EEST				Stadium: Fălești Stadium; Referee: Ghenadie Sidenco

20 April 2019	Academia Viitorul (3)	0–2	Intersport Sănătăuca (3)	Sănătăuca
15:00 EEST				Stadium: Sănătăuca Stadium; Referee: Vladislav Ivancenco

20 April 2019	Cruiz Plus (3)	1–4	Rîșcani (3)	Camenca
15:00 EEST				Stadium: Camenca Stadium; Referee: Dumitru Muntean

20 April 2019	ARF Ialoveni (3)	2–1	Bogzești (3)	Mileștii Mici
15:00 EEST				Stadium: Mileștii Mici Stadium; Referee: Cătălin Pidghirnîi

20 April 2019	Sporting Trestieni (3)	7–0	Codru-Juniori (3)	Nisporeni
15:00 EEST				Stadium: Mircea Eliade; Referee: Vitalie Cobzac

20 April 2019	Fulger Ialoveni (3)	7–3 (a.e.t.)	Sinteza Căușeni (3)	Ialoveni
15:00 EEST				Stadium: Ialoveni Stadium; Referee: Valeriu Minciună

20 April 2019	Văsieni (3)	1–0	Cricova (3)	Văsieni
15:00 EEST				Stadium: Văsieni Stadium; Referee: Ion Bilea

20 April 2019	Slobozia Mare (3)	4–2	Congaz (3)	Slobozia Mare
15:00 EEST				Stadium: Slobozia Mare Stadium; Referee: Gheorghe Dandeș

== First round ==
17 clubs from the Divizia B and 15 clubs from the Divizia A entered this round. In a match, the home advantage was granted to the team from the lower league. If two teams are from the same division, the team that finished higher on the league in the previous season played their tie away. Matches were played on 3 and 4 May 2019.

3 May 2019	FCM Ungheni (3)	3–0	Zaria Bălți (2)	Ungheni
17:00 EEST				Stadium: Ungheni Stadium; Referee: Daniel Luca

4 May 2019	Inter Soroca (3)	2–3 (a.e.t.)	Florești (2)	Soroca
17:00 EEST				Stadium: Soroca Stadium; Referee: Vladislav Ivancenco

4 May 2019	Edineț (3)	5–2	Grănicerul Glodeni (2)	Edineț
17:00 EEST				Stadium: Edineț Stadium; Referee: Andrei Cuziac

4 May 2019	Pepeni (3)	1–1 (a.e.t.) (5–6 p)	Sîngerei (2)	Pepeni
17:00 EEST				Stadium: Pepeni Stadium; Referee: Alexandru Stefciuc

4 May 2019	Fălești (3)	2–2 (a.e.t.) (2–4 p)	Speranța Drochia (2)	Fălești
17:00 EEST				Stadium: Fălești Stadium; Referee: Veaceslav Morgun

4 May 2019	Intersport Sănătăuca (3)	0–1	Iskra Rîbnița (2)	Sănătăuca
17:00 EEST				Stadium: Sănătăuca Stadium; Referee: Ivan Tudos

4 May 2019	Rîșcani (3)	1–4	Ungheni (2)	Rîșcani
17:00 EEST				Stadium: Rîșcani Stadium; Referee: Serghei Derenov

4 May 2019	ARF Ialoveni (3)	0–2	Victoria Chișinău (2)	Mileștii Mici
17:00 EEST				Stadium: Mileștii Mici Stadium; Referee: Andrei Diordiev

4 May 2019	Sporting Trestieni (3)	5–0	Sparta Chișinău (2)	Nisporeni
17:00 EEST				Stadium: Mircea Eliade; Referee: Igor Boșca

4 May 2019	Fulger Ialoveni (3)	2–3	Sucleia (3)	Ialoveni
17:00 EEST				Stadium: Ialoveni Stadium; Referee: Grigore Vorfolomei

4 May 2019	Văsieni (3)	0–3	Tighina (2)	Văsieni
17:00 EEST				Stadium: Văsieni Stadium; Referee: Denis Ivlev

4 May 2019	Flacăra Mingir (3)	0–3 (a.e.t.)	Real Succes (2)	Mingir
17:00 EEST				Stadium: Mingir Stadium; Referee: Valeriu Minciună

4 May 2019	Slobozia Mare (3)	1–1 (a.e.t.) (5–4 p)	Cahul-2005 (2)	Slobozia Mare
17:00 EEST				Stadium: Slobozia Mare Stadium; Referee: Vitalie Cobzac

4 May 2019	Fortuna Pleșeni (3)	1–2	Sireți (2)	Pleșeni
17:00 EEST				Stadium: Pleșeni Stadium; Referee: Gheorghe Dandeș

4 May 2019	Olimp Comrat (3)	1–0	Dacia Buiucani (2)	Comrat
17:00 EEST				Stadium: Comrat Stadium; Referee: Iurie Covtun

4 May 2019	Maiak Chirsova (3)	1–0	Spartanii Selemet (2)	Chirsova
17:00 EEST				Stadium: Chirsova Stadium; Referee: Ion Bilea

== Second round ==
The 16 winners from the previous round entered this round. In a match, the home advantage was granted to the team from the lower league. If two teams are from the same division, the team that finished higher on the league in the previous season played their tie away. Matches were played on 24 and 25 May 2019.

24 May 2019	Ungheni (2)	1–4	Victoria Chișinău (2)	Ungheni
17:00 EEST				Stadium: Ungheni Stadium; Referee: Andrei Ceban

25 May 2019	Sporting Trestieni (3)	3–2 (a.e.t.)	Sucleia (3)	Nisporeni
16:00 EEST	A. Cristioglo 10'; I. Mirciu 19'; N. Semcov 92'		V. Gheorghiță 30'; Gorodețchi 40'	Stadium: Mircea Eliade; Referee: Veaceslav Morgun

25 May 2019	Edineț (3)	1–1 (a.e.t.) (3–1 p)	Florești (2)	Edineț
17:00 EEST				Stadium: Edineț Stadium; Referee: Alexandru Stefciuc

25 May 2019	FCM Ungheni (3)	3–1	Sîngerei (2)	Ungheni
17:00 EEST	D. Sîrbu 16'; N. Porojniuc 68'; E. Șoldan 79'		I. Ungureanu 75'	Stadium: Ungheni Stadium; Referee: Denis Ivlev

25 May 2019	Speranța Drochia (2)	1–1 (a.e.t.) (4–3 p)	Iskra Rîbnița (2)	Rîșcani
17:00 EEST				Stadium: Rîșcani Stadium; Referee: Vladislav Ivancenco

25 May 2019	Tighina (2)	5–0	Real Succes (2)	Bender
17:00 EEST				Stadium: Bender Stadium; Referee: Ion Orlic

25 May 2019	Slobozia Mare (3)	1–2	Sireți (2)	Cahul
17:00 EEST				Stadium: Atlant Stadium; Referee: Radu Tobultoc

25 May 2019	Maiak Chirsova (3)	2–0	Olimp Comrat (3)	Chirsova
17:00 EEST	M. Crudu 3'; S. Dobrioglo 69' (pen.)			Stadium: Chirsova Stadium; Referee: Ion Bilea

== Final stage ==
=== Bracket ===
Round of 16
Sporting Trestieni	2	1	3
Zimbru Chișinău	4	5	9
Petrocub-Hîncești	7	2	9
Tighina	0	0	0
Sheriff Tiraspol	12	15	27
Sireți	0	0	0
Dinamo-Auto	8	3	11
Maiak Chirsova	0	0	0
Edineț	1	1	2
Milsami Orhei	3	6	9
Sfîntul Gheorghe	1	2	3
FCM Ungheni	0	0	0
Codru Lozova	7	3	10
Victoria Chișinău	1	0	1
Speranța Nisporeni	6	3	9
Speranța Drochia	1	0	1

Quarter-finals
Zimbru Chișinău	1	1	2
Petrocub-Hîncești	2	3	5
Sheriff Tiraspol	1	5	6
Dinamo-Auto	0	0	0
Milsami Orhei	0	0	0
Sfîntul Gheorghe	1	0	1
Codru Lozova	2	0	2
Speranța Nisporeni	2	5	7

Semi-finals
Petrocub-Hîncești (a)	1	1	2
Sheriff Tiraspol	0	2	2
Sfîntul Gheorghe	5	2	7
Speranța Nisporeni	2	2	4

Final
Petrocub-Hîncești (a.e.t.) (p)	0 (5)
Sfîntul Gheorghe	0 (3)

== Round of 16 ==
The 8 winners from the previous round and 8 clubs from the Divizia Națională entered this round. The home teams in the first legs and the pairs were determined in a draw held on 3 June 2019. The first legs were played on 25 and 26 June 2019 and the second legs on 5, 6 and 7 July 2019.

Team 1	Agg.	Team 2	1st leg	2nd leg
Edineț	2–9	Milsami Orhei	1–3	1–6
Sfîntul Gheorghe	3–0	FCM Ungheni	1–0	2–0
Speranța Nisporeni	9–1 (Note: Order of legs reversed after original draw.)	Speranța Drochia	6–1	3–0
Codru Lozova	10–1	Victoria Chișinău	7–1	3–0
Sporting Trestieni	3–9	Zimbru Chișinău	2–4	1–5
Petrocub-Hîncești	9–0	Tighina	7–0	2–0
Sheriff Tiraspol	27–0	Sireți	12–0	15–0
Dinamo-Auto	11–0	Maiak Chirsova	8–0	3–0

=== First leg ===
25 June 2019	Edineț (3)	1–3	Milsami Orhei (1)	Edineț
18:00 EEST	S. Popovici 90+2'	Report	Stînă 36'; O. Martin 45+1'; Ibrian 60'	Stadium: Edineț Stadium; Attendance: 700; Referee: Alexandru Stefciuc

25 June 2019	Speranța Nisporeni (1)	6–1	Speranța Drochia (2)	Orhei
18:00 EEST	D. Mosquera 24', 54'; F. Ambassa 29', 35'; Iurcu 50'; Ponce 61'	Report	Ovseanicov 69'	Stadium: CSR Orhei; Attendance: 150; Referee: Andrei Breguța

25 June 2019	Sheriff Tiraspol (1)	12–0	Sireți (2)	Tiraspol
19:00 EEST	Anton 20'; Tambe 24', 79'; Leandro 39'; Palić 44'; Jach 54'; Pedersen 63', 70'; Dijinari 68'; Ghecev 72', 73', 87'	Report		Stadium: Sheriff-2 Stadium; Attendance: 500; Referee: Ion Orlic

25 June 2019	Petrocub-Hîncești (1)	7–0	Tighina (2)	Hîncești
20:00 EEST	Bejan 4'; Guera 10'; D. Taras 19', 62', 81'; V. Ambros 31'; I. Țurcan 75'	Report		Stadium: Municipal Stadium; Attendance: 300; Referee: Andrei Cojocaru

26 June 2019	Sfîntul Gheorghe (1)	1–0	FCM Ungheni (3)	Suruceni
18:00 EEST	Suvorov 40'	Report		Stadium: Suruceni Stadium; Attendance: 100; Referee: Iurie Covtun

26 June 2019	Codru Lozova (1)	7–1	Victoria Chișinău (2)	Chișinău
18:00 EEST	A. Drab 25'; A. Rusu 39', 64', 86'; A. Bursuc 52'; S. Nazar 55'; D. Janu 58'	Report	Bezimov 27'	Stadium: Zimbru-2; Attendance: 100; Referee: Petru Stoianov

26 June 2019	Sporting Trestieni (3)	2–4	Zimbru Chișinău (1)	Nisporeni
18:00 EEST	V. Zalenschi 14'; E. Avram 45' (pen.)	Report	Prepeliță 41'; Iurașco 48' (pen.); A. Barabaș 69', 79'	Stadium: Mircea Eliade; Attendance: 200; Referee: Gabriel Tupicica

26 June 2019	Dinamo-Auto (1)	8–0	Maiak Chirsova (3)	Tîrnauca
18:00 EEST	Mihaliov 5', 8', 63', 66'; S. Dincov 30' (o.g.); Cobeț 45', 59'; Nihaev 90'	Report		Stadium: Dinamo-Auto; Attendance: 50; Referee: Ion Bilea

=== Second leg ===
5 July 2019	Speranța Drochia (2)	0–3 (1–9 agg.)	Speranța Nisporeni (1)	Rîșcani
18:00 EEST		Report	F. Ambassa 19'; Ponce 43', 74'	Stadium: Rîșcani Stadium; Attendance: 300; Referee: Ghenadie Sidenco

5 July 2019	Victoria Chișinău (2)	0–3 (1–10 agg.)	Codru Lozova (1)	Chișinău
18:00 EEST		Report	A. Drab 40'; M. Cojocaru 48'; D. Adam 67'	Stadium: Real Succes; Attendance: 150; Referee: Alexandru Stefciuc

5 July 2019	Tighina (2)	0–2 (0–9 agg.)	Petrocub-Hîncești (1)	Bender
18:00 EEST		Report	Gulceac 66', 73'	Stadium: Bender Stadium; Attendance: 350; Referee: Andrei Ceban

5 July 2019	Milsami Orhei (1)	6–1 (9–2 agg.)	Edineț (3)	Orhei
19:00 EEST	A. Antoniuc 1'; V. Jardan 10'; Stînă 33', 37'; O. Martin 65'; Zagaevschi 70'	Report	I. Bîzdîga 28'	Stadium: CSR Orhei; Attendance: 200; Referee: Stanislav Leu

5 July 2019	Sireți (2)	0–15 (0–27 agg.)	Sheriff Tiraspol (1)	Tiraspol
19:00 EEST		Report	Latifi 5', 52', 79'; Tambe 7', 12'; Hordiyenko 21'; Kendysh 34' (pen.), 50', 69' (pen.), 89'; Boban 43', 48'; Leandro 59', 84'; Ángel 87'	Stadium: Sheriff Stadium; Attendance: 650; Referee: Andrei Diordiev

6 July 2019	FCM Ungheni (3)	0–2 (0–3 agg.)	Sfîntul Gheorghe (1)	Ungheni
18:00 EEST		Report	Mandrîcenco 86'; A. Carastoian 90+3'	Stadium: Ungheni Stadium; Attendance: 600; Referee: Andrei Breguța

7 July 2019	Zimbru Chișinău (1)	5–1 (9–3 agg.)	Sporting Trestieni (3)	Chișinău
18:00 EEST	I. Țîgîrlaș 17'; Pîslă 33'; Iurașco 36'; N. Murovanîi 55'; Scoarță 90+3'	Report	L. Podlesnov 65'	Stadium: Zimbru-2; Attendance: 100; Referee: Veaceslav Banari

7 July 2019	Maiak Chirsova (3)	0–3 (0–11 agg.)	Dinamo-Auto (1)	Chirsova
18:00 EEST		Report	S. Bobrov 60'; Mihaliov 63'; N. Ciumacenco 85'	Stadium: Chirsova Stadium; Attendance: 500; Referee: Valeriu Minciună

== Quarter-finals ==
The 8 winners from the previous round entered the quarter-finals. The home teams in the first legs were determined in a draw held on 9 July 2019. The first legs were played on 24 and 25 September 2019 and the second legs on 29 and 30 October 2019.

Team 1	Agg.	Team 2	1st leg	2nd leg
Milsami Orhei	0–1	Sfîntul Gheorghe	0–1	0–0
Codru Lozova	2–7	Speranța Nisporeni	2–2	0–5
Zimbru Chișinău	2–5	Petrocub-Hîncești	1–2	1–3
Sheriff Tiraspol	6–0	Dinamo-Auto	1–0	5–0

=== First leg ===
24 September 2019	Zimbru Chișinău (1)	1–2	Petrocub-Hîncești (1)	Chișinău
16:00 EEST	Sidorenco 45+1'	Report	Țurcan 63'; Bejan 84'	Stadium: Zimbru-2; Attendance: 150; Referee: Dumitru Muntean

24 September 2019	Milsami Orhei (1)	0–1	Sfîntul Gheorghe (1)	Orhei
19:00 EEST		Report	A. Calac 74'	Stadium: CSR Orhei; Attendance: 300; Referee: Andrei Ceban

25 September 2019	Codru Lozova (1)	2–2	Speranța Nisporeni (1)	Chișinău
16:00 EEST	D. Buhanenco 48'; I. Mamaliga 66'	Report	F. Ambassa 7'; Iurcu 53' (pen.)	Stadium: Zimbru-2; Attendance: 150; Referee: Andrei Cojocaru

25 September 2019	Sheriff Tiraspol (1)	1–0	Dinamo-Auto (1)	Tiraspol
19:00 EEST	Boban 79'	Report		Stadium: Sheriff-2 Stadium; Attendance: 700; Referee: Andrei Diordiev

=== Second leg ===
29 October 2019	Speranța Nisporeni (1)	5–0 (7–2 agg.)	Codru Lozova (1)	Orhei
13:00 EET	S. Trofan 5', 18'; Bruno 25' (pen.), 36', 49'	Report		Stadium: CSR Orhei; Attendance: 100; Referee: Andrei Cojocaru

29 October 2019	Dinamo-Auto (1)	0–5 (0–6 agg.)	Sheriff Tiraspol (1)	Tîrnauca
13:00 EET		Report	Kendysh 24', 90+2'; Boban 28'; N'Diaye 39'; Leandro 66'	Stadium: Dinamo-Auto; Attendance: 50; Referee: Ghenadie Sidenco

30 October 2019	Sfîntul Gheorghe (1)	0–0 (1–0 agg.)	Milsami Orhei (1)	Suruceni
13:00 EET		Report		Stadium: Suruceni Stadium; Attendance: 100; Referee: Alexandru Tean

30 October 2019	Petrocub-Hîncești (1)	3–1 (5–2 agg.)	Zimbru Chișinău (1)	Hîncești
17:30 EET	V. Ambros 53' (pen.); Gulceac 66'; Bejan 84'	Report	Pîslă 51'	Stadium: Municipal Stadium; Attendance: 300; Referee: Petru Stoianov

== Semi-finals ==
The 4 winners from the previous round entered the semi-finals. The home teams in the first legs were determined in a draw held on 1 November 2019. The first legs were played on 21 and 22 June 2020 and the second legs on 25 June 2020.

Team 1	Agg.	Team 2	1st leg	2nd leg
Sfîntul Gheorghe	7–4	Speranța Nisporeni	5–2	2–2
Petrocub-Hîncești	2–2 (a)	Sheriff Tiraspol	1–0	1–2

=== First leg ===
21 June 2020	Sfîntul Gheorghe (1)	5–2	Speranța Nisporeni (1)	Suruceni
17:00 EEST	Volkov 42'; Novicov 64'; Suvorov 68', 77' (pen.); Iurcu 83'	Report	S. Trofan 30'; Pîslă 80' (pen.)	Stadium: Suruceni Stadium; Attendance: 0 (Note: The semi-finals and final were played behind closed doors due to the COVID-19 pandemic in Moldova.); Referee: Andrei Cojocaru

21 June 2020	Petrocub-Hîncești (1)	1–0	Sheriff Tiraspol (1)	Hîncești
20:00 EEST	Țurcan 31'	Report		Stadium: Municipal Stadium; Attendance: 0 Referee: Andrei Breguța

The match was abandoned after 28 minutes due to heavy rain, and was resumed on Monday 22 June 2020 at the Zimbru Stadium in Chișinău, 20:00 EEST, from the point of abandonment.

=== Second leg ===
25 June 2020	Speranța Nisporeni (1)	2–2 (4–7 agg.)	Sfîntul Gheorghe (1)	Orhei
17:00 EEST	M. Bolun 54'; Pîslă 82'	Report	Mandrîcenco 65'; Mochulyak 83'	Stadium: CSR Orhei; Attendance: 0 Referee: Ion Orlic

25 June 2020	Sheriff Tiraspol (1)	2–1 (2–2 a agg.)	Petrocub-Hîncești (1)	Tiraspol
20:00 EEST	Parra 34'; Bliznichenko 45+2' (pen.)	Report	S. Plătică 90+3'	Stadium: Sheriff Stadium; Attendance: 0 Referee: Petru Stoianov

== Final ==
The final was played on Tuesday 30 June 2020 at the Zimbru Stadium in Chișinău. The "home" team (for administrative purposes) was determined by an additional draw held on 26 June 2020.

30 June 2020
21:00 EEST

Petrocub-Hîncești	0–0 (a.e.t.)	Sfîntul Gheorghe
	Report
Penalties
Jardan (penalty scored); Damașcan (penalty scored); Rozgoniuc (penalty scored); Țurcan (penalty scored); Rusu (penalty scored)	5–3	(penalty scored) Stînă; (penalty scored) Sagna; (penalty scored) Svinarenco; (penalty missed) Bondarenco

Zimbru Stadium, Chișinău
Attendance: 0
Referee: Amin Kurgheli (Belarus)

Petrocub	Sf. Gheorghe

GK	29	(Moldova) Cristian Avram
DF	2	(Cameroon) Jacques Onana
DF	4	(Moldova) Petru Racu	(yellow card) 45+1'	(substituted off) 58'
DF	20	(Cameroon) Douanla Melachio
DF	22	(Moldova) Ștefan Efros		(substituted off) 46'
DF	90	(Moldova) Ion Jardan
MF	8	(Moldova) Iaser Țurcan
MF	27	(Moldova) Artiom Rozgoniuc	(yellow card) 63'
MF	84	(Moldova) Alexandru Onica		(substituted off) 67'
FW	9	(Moldova) Vladimir Ambros (c)		(substituted off) 90+3'
FW	11	(Moldova) Sergiu Plătică
Substitutes:
GK	99	(Moldova) Igor Mostovei
DF	5	(Moldova) Arcadie Rusu		(substituted on) 108'
MF	13	(Moldova) Vlad Oprea
MF	17	(Moldova) Victor Bogaciuc		(substituted on) 90+3'
FW	7	(Moldova) Ilie Damașcan		(substituted on) 67'
FW	10	(Moldova) Alexandru Bejan	(yellow card) 98'	(substituted on) 46'
FW	18	(Moldova) Vadim Gulceac	(yellow card) 72'	(substituted on) 58'	(substituted off) 108'
Head Coach:
(Moldova) Lilian Popescu

GK	28	(Moldova) Nicolae Cebotari
DF	4	(Moldova) Andrei Novicov
DF	17	(Moldova) Petru Ojog	(yellow card) 56'	(substituted off) 114'
DF	18	(Ukraine) Yevhen Smirnov
DF	19	(Moldova) Serghei Svinarenco	(yellow card) 72'
MF	5	(Moldova) Vitalie Plămădeală (c)
MF	7	(Moldova) Alexandru Suvorov		(substituted off) 75'
MF	8	(Ukraine) Renat Mochulyak		(substituted off) 87'
MF	21	(Moldova) Eugen Slivca	(yellow card) 65'	(substituted off) 75'
FW	9	(Belarus) Roman Volkov	(yellow card) 80'	(substituted off) 91'
FW	14	(Moldova) Maxim Iurcu		(substituted off) 67'
Substitutes:
GK	1	(Moldova) Maxim Railean
DF	16	(Moldova) Igor Bondarenco		(substituted on) 114'
MF	11	(Moldova) Mihail Ghecev	(yellow card) 90+3'	(substituted on) 67'
MF	15	(Moldova) Victor Stînă		(substituted on) 91'
MF	22	(Moldova) Dmitri Mandrîcenco		(substituted on) 75'
MF	24	(Senegal) Sidy Sagna		(substituted on) 75'
FW	10	(Moldova) Sergiu Istrati		(substituted on) 87'
Head Coach:
(Moldova) Serghei Cebotari

Assistant referees:
Yury Khomchanka (Belarus)
Siarhei Kasavets (Belarus)
Fourth official:
Andrei Breguța (Moldova)

Match rules

- 90 minutes.
- 30 minutes of extra time if necessary.
- Penalty shoot-out if score is still level.
- Seven named substitutes.
- Maximum of five substitutions, with a sixth allowed in extra time. (Note: Each team was given only three opportunities to make substitutions, with a fourth opportunity in extra time, excluding substitutions made at half-time, before the start of extra time and at half-time in extra time.)
