= 2018 Moldovan "A" Division =

Divizia A
- Season: 2018
- Dates: 21 April 2018 – 3 November 2018
- Champions: Codru
- Promoted: Codru
- Matches: 132
- Goals: 509 (3.86 per match)
- Top goalscorer: Ghenadie Orbu (21 goals)
- Best goalkeeper: Denis Cristofovici (7 clean sheets)
- Biggest home win: Saxan 8–0 Sparta (14 October 2018); Cahul-2005 9–1 Ungheni (3 November 2018)
- Biggest away win: Real Succes 1–7 Codru (21 April 2018)
- Highest scoring: Real Succes 5–8 Ungheni (13 October 2018)
- Longest winning run: 5 matches Codru
- Longest unbeaten run: 20 matches Codru
- Longest winless run: 11 matches Iskra
- Longest losing run: 5 matches Saxan; Real Succes

The 2018 Moldovan "A" Division (Romanian: Divizia A) was the 28th season of Moldovan football's second-tier league. The season started on 21 April 2018 and ended on 3 November 2018. Victoria Chișinău were the defending champions, after winning their first title in the competition in the previous season.

== Teams ==
Location of teams in 2018 Divizia A

| Club | Location |
|---|---|
| Cahul-2005 | Cahul |
| Codru | Lozova |
| Florești | Florești |
| Grănicerul | Glodeni |
| Iskra | Rîbnița |
| Real Succes | Chișinău |
| Saxan | Ceadîr-Lunga |
| Sîngerei | Sîngerei |
| Sireți | Sireți |
| Sparta | Chișinău |
| Ungheni | Ungheni |
| Victoria | Chișinău |

== Season summary ==
=== League table ===
| Pos | Team | Pld | W | D | L | GF | GA | GD | Pts | Promotion or relegation |
|---|---|---|---|---|---|---|---|---|---|---|
| 1 | Codru Lozova (C, P) | 22 | 14 | 6 | 2 | 53 | 20 | +33 | 48 | Promotion to Divizia Națională |
| 2 | Florești | 22 | 12 | 4 | 6 | 40 | 27 | +13 | 40 | |
| 3 | Sîngerei | 22 | 10 | 6 | 6 | 47 | 42 | +5 | 36 | |
| 4 | Victoria Chișinău | 22 | 10 | 5 | 7 | 51 | 43 | +8 | 35 | |
| 5 | Grănicerul Glodeni | 22 | 10 | 4 | 8 | 43 | 35 | +8 | 34 | |
| 6 | Saxan | 22 | 9 | 3 | 10 | 41 | 31 | +10 | 30 | Expelled (Note: Saxan completed the season but failed to get the license for the 2019 season and were expelled from the league.) |
| 7 | Ungheni | 22 | 7 | 7 | 8 | 50 | 65 | −15 | 28 | |
| 8 | Cahul-2005 | 22 | 7 | 6 | 9 | 38 | 31 | +7 | 27 | |
| 9 | Sireți | 22 | 6 | 5 | 11 | 36 | 47 | −11 | 23 | |
| 10 | Real Succes | 22 | 6 | 4 | 12 | 49 | 75 | −26 | 22 | |
| 11 | Sparta Chișinău | 22 | 5 | 6 | 11 | 34 | 51 | −17 | 21 | |
| 12 | Iskra Rîbnița (Note: As per regulations, the twelfth placed team, Iskra Rîbnița was to be relegated to Divizia B, but the club spared relegation due to lack of teams.) | 22 | 4 | 8 | 10 | 27 | 42 | −15 | 20 | |

Source: FMF, Soccerway
Rules for classification: 1) Points; 2) Head-to-head points; 3) Head-to-head goal difference; 4) Head-to-head away goals scored; 5) Head-to-head goals scored; 6) Matches won; 7) Goal difference; 8) Goals scored; 9) Less red cards; 10) Less yellow cards.
(C) Champions; (P) Promoted

=== Results ===
Teams will play each other twice (once home, once away).

| Home \ Away | CAH | COD | FLO | GRĂ | ISK | REA | SAX | SÎN | SIR | SPA | UNG | VIC |
|---|---|---|---|---|---|---|---|---|---|---|---|---|
| Cahul-2005 | — | 0–1 | 0–1 | 0–1 | 2–0 | 2–1 | 0–0 | 0–3 | 3–0 | 4–1 | 9–1 | 1–1 |
| Codru Lozova | 2–0 | — | 2–2 | 3–0 | 4–0 | 6–0 | 1–0 | 4–1 | 1–1 | 1–0 | 2–2 | 3–1 |
| Florești | 3–1 | 1–0 | — | 3–1 | 1–1 | 5–1 | 2–1 | 1–1 | 2–1 | 1–1 | 2–3 | 2–3 |
| Grănicerul Glodeni | 2–2 | 2–2 | 2–0 | — | 2–0 | 1–2 | 5–1 | 3–0 | 1–1 | 2–0 | 6–3 | 1–2 |
| Iskra Rîbnița | 2–1 | 0–0 | 0–1 | 0–3 | — | 3–3 | 1–3 | 2–2 | 2–2 | 3–3 | 1–1 | 2–0 |
| Real Succes | 2–2 | 1–7 | 1–3 | 3–2 | 3–4 | — | 2–1 | 0–3 | 4–3 | 1–1 | 5–8 | 3–5 |
| Saxan | 2–2 | 3–1 | 0–1 | 0–1 | 1–0 | 6–3 | — | 0–1 | 1–0 | 8–0 | 6–2 | 2–0 |
| Sîngerei | 1–1 | 3–3 | 2–1 | 1–0 | 3–2 | 3–1 | 1–1 | — | 3–0 | 5–3 | 1–2 | 4–3 |
| Sireți | 2–1 | 1–3 | 2–4 | 1–4 | 1–2 | 2–2 | 0–4 | 3–1 | — | 3–1 | 4–1 | 3–1 |
| Sparta Chișinău | 0–2 | 2–3 | 2–1 | 5–0 | 3–1 | 1–4 | 1–0 | 3–2 | 1–2 | — | 1–1 | 2–2 |
| Ungheni | 4–1 | 0–3 | 0–3 | 4–2 | 1–1 | 2–5 | 4–1 | 3–3 | 3–2 | 1–1 | — | 4–4 |
| Victoria Chișinău | 1–4 | 0–1 | 2–0 | 2–2 | 2–0 | 5–2 | 3–0 | 6–3 | 2–2 | 4–2 | 2–0 | — |

Source: FMF (in Romanian)
Legend: Blue = home team win; Yellow = draw; Red = away team win.

== Results by round ==
The following table represents the teams game results in each round.

| Team ╲ Round | 1 | 2 | 3 | 4 | 5 | 6 | 7 | 8 | 9 | 10 | 11 | 12 | 13 | 14 | 15 | 16 | 17 | 18 | 19 | 20 | 21 | 22 |
|---|---|---|---|---|---|---|---|---|---|---|---|---|---|---|---|---|---|---|---|---|---|---|
| Cahul-2005 | L | W | L | W | D | W | L | L | L | W | L | D | W | L | D | L | D | W | D | D | L | W |
| Codru Lozova | W | D | W | W | W | W | W | D | W | W | D | W | W | W | D | D | D | W | W | W | L | L |
| Florești | L | W | D | W | W | W | W | L | L | D | D | L | L | W | W | W | D | W | W | W | L | W |
| Grănicerul Glodeni | W | W | L | L | W | L | L | W | W | L | D | D | W | W | W | L | D | D | L | L | W | W |
| Iskra Rîbnița | D | L | D | L | W | L | L | W | D | L | D | D | L | L | D | L | L | D | D | W | W | L |
| Real Succes | L | L | W | L | L | L | W | L | W | W | W | L | L | L | L | L | D | D | D | L | W | D |
| Saxan | D | L | L | W | D | L | W | L | L | L | L | L | W | W | W | W | L | W | D | W | L | W |
| Sîngerei | D | L | D | W | W | L | W | D | W | W | D | W | D | W | L | W | L | W | L | D | L | W |
| Sireți | W | D | W | L | L | W | L | W | D | W | D | W | L | D | L | L | L | L | D | L | L | L |
| Sparta Chișinău | L | L | D | D | L | L | L | L | W | D | L | L | L | W | D | W | W | L | D | L | W | D |
| Ungheni | D | W | W | D | L | W | L | W | L | L | W | D | D | L | D | D | D | L | L | W | W | L |
| Victoria Chișinău | W | W | L | L | L | W | W | W | L | L | W | W | W | D | D | W | D | D | D | L | W | L |

W = Win; D = Draw; L = Loss

== Top goalscorers ==
| Rank | Player | Club | Goals |
|---|---|---|---|
| 1 | (Moldova) Ghenadie Orbu | Victoria | 21 |
| 2 | (Moldova) Dmitri Maneacov | Sîngerei (19) & Grănicerul (1) | 20 |
| 3 | (Moldova) Radu Lazar | Sireți | 18 |
| 4 | (Moldova) Vladimir Haritov | Cahul-2005 | 14 |
| 4 | (Moldova) Nicolae Nemerenco | Codru | 14 |
| 6 | (Moldova) Roman Șumchin | Ungheni | 13 |
| 6 | (Moldova) Igor Bîcicov | Victoria (2) & Florești (11) | 13 |
| 8 | (Nigeria) Steven Alfred | Saxan | 11 |
| 8 | (Moldova) Artiom Zabun | Victoria | 11 |
| 10 | (Moldova) Vadim Crîcimari | Codru | 10 |
| 10 | (Moldova) Maxim Bucătaru | Ungheni | 10 |

== Clean sheets ==
| Rank | Player | Club | Clean sheets |
|---|---|---|---|
| 1 | (Moldova) Denis Cristofovici | Grănicerul | 7 |
| 2 | (Moldova) Ion Rîmbu | Codru | 6 |
| 2 | (Moldova) Ruslan Istrati | Saxan | 6 |
| 4 | (Moldova) Andrei Chilari | Sîngerei | 5 |
| 5 | (Moldova) Cristian Apostolachi | Codru | 4 |
| 6 | (Moldova) Evgheni Gorbunov | Cahul-2005 | 3 |
| 6 | (Moldova) Andrei Vicol | Victoria | 3 |
| 8 | (Moldova) Adrian Golubciuc | Florești | 2 |
| 8 | (Moldova) Anatolie Cebotari | Iskra | 2 |
| 8 | (Moldova) Andrian Gulienco | Sparta | 2 |
| 8 | (Moldova) Ghenadie Moșneaga | Florești | 2 |
