= 2017 Moldovan "B" Division =

Divizia B
- Season: 2017

The 2017 Moldovan "B" Division (Romanian: Divizia B) was the 27th season of Moldovan football's third-tier league. A total of 30 teams competed in this division. The season began on 29 July 2017 and ended on 25 November 2017.

The league consisted of three regional groups, Nord (North), Centru (Centre) and Sud (South).

== North ==
Pos	Team	Pld	W	D	L	GF	GA	GD	Pts	Promotion or relegation
1	Florești (C, P)	18	14	2	2	57	19	+38	44	Promotion to Divizia A
2	Soroca	18	12	3	3	41	21	+20	39	
3	Intersport Sănătăuca	18	11	4	3	46	19	+27	37	
4	FCM Ungheni	18	11	3	4	60	24	+36	36	
5	Speranța Drochia	18	9	2	7	48	30	+18	29	
6	Maiac Cioropcani	18	7	0	11	33	33	0	21 (Note: Maiac ahead of Zaria-2 on head-to-head points: Zaria-2–Maiac 2–3, Maiac–Zaria-2 1–0)	
7	Zaria-2 Bălți	18	6	3	9	30	38	−8	21	withdrew (Note: Zaria-2 Bălți completed the season but withdrew from the league prior to the start of the next season.)
8	Rîșcani	18	6	1	11	26	59	−33	19	
9	Cruiz Camenca	18	3	1	14	14	59	−45	10	
10	Fălești	18	1	1	16	7	60	−53	4	Expelled (Note: Fălești failed to arrive for their 1st and 13th Round games and subsequently were expelled from the competition. All remaining fixtures are awarded 0–3 against them.)

Source: FMF, Soccerway
Rules for classification: 1) Points; 2) Head-to-head points; 3) Head-to-head goal difference; 4) Head-to-head away goals scored; 5) Head-to-head goals scored; 6) Matches won; 7) Goal difference; 8) Goals scored; 9) Less yellow cards; 10) Less red cards.
(C) Champions; (P) Promoted

=== Results ===
The schedule consists of two rounds, each team plays each other once home-and-away for a total of 18 matches per team.

Home \ Away	CRU	FĂL	FLO	INT	MAI	RÎȘ	SOR	SPE	UNG	ZAR
Cruiz Camenca	—	1–0	1–5	0–2	2–1	0–1	0–1	1–7	0–11	1–2
Fălești	0–3	—	0–4	1–3	0–2	2–5	1–4	0–3	0–3	0–2
Florești	5–0	3–0	—	3–2	2–1	4–1	2–1	1–1	0–2	6–0
Intersport Sănătăuca	3–0	9–0	0–0	—	2–1	1–1	3–3	1–0	1–1	3–1
Maiac Cioropcani	4–2	3–0	2–4	0–1	—	4–2	1–2	2–3	2–3	1–0
Rîșcani	2–1	3–0	0–5	1–4	0–4	—	4–2	2–0	2–6	2–3
Soroca	0–0	3–0	5–3	2–1	4–1	5–0	—	1–0	2–1	1–0
Speranța Drochia	5–1	7–0	1–3	1–4	2–1	7–0	2–1	—	2–2	1–3
FCM Ungheni	6–1	1–2	1–4	2–1	2–0	9–0	1–3	4–1	—	3–1
Zaria-2 Bălți	4–0	1–1	1–3	2–5	2–3	2–0	1–1	3–5	2–2	—

Source: FMF (in Romanian)
Legend: Blue = home team win; Yellow = draw; Red = away team win.

== Centre ==
Pos	Team	Pld	W	D	L	GF	GA	GD	Pts	Promotion or relegation
1	Sireți (C, P)	18	15	2	1	63	13	+50	47 (Note: Sireți ahead of Tighina on head-to-head points: Sireți–Tighina 1–1, Tighina–Sireți 0–1)	Promotion to Divizia A
2	Tighina	18	15	2	1	59	13	+46	47	
3	Steaua-57 Chișinău	18	12	2	4	60	21	+39	38	withdrew (Note: Steaua-57 Chișinău completed the season but withdrew from the league prior to the start of the next season.)
4	Bogzești	18	11	1	6	49	27	+22	34	
5	Fulger Ialoveni	18	10	2	6	37	22	+15	32	
6	Codru-Juniori	18	6	3	9	28	37	−9	21	
7	Cricova	18	6	0	12	38	58	−20	18	
8	Sinteza Căușeni	18	4	1	13	18	62	−44	13	
9	Boldurești	18	2	1	15	14	64	−50	7	withdrew (Note: Boldurești completed the season but withdrew from the league prior to the start of the next season.)
10	Anina Anenii Noi	18	2	0	16	16	65	−49	6	withdrew (Note: Anina Anenii Noi withdrew from the league after round 9. All remaining fixtures are awarded 0–3 against them.)

Source: FMF, Soccerway
Rules for classification: 1) Points; 2) Head-to-head points; 3) Head-to-head goal difference; 4) Head-to-head away goals scored; 5) Head-to-head goals scored; 6) Matches won; 7) Goal difference; 8) Goals scored; 9) Less yellow cards; 10) Less red cards.
(C) Champions; (P) Promoted

=== Results ===
The schedule consists of two rounds, each team plays each other once home-and-away for a total of 18 matches per team.

Home \ Away	ANI	BOG	BOL	COD	CRI	FUL	SIN	SIR	STE	TIG
Anina Anenii Noi	—	2–3	3–0	0–3	0–3	1–2	4–1	0–3	1–2	0–3
Bogzești	3–0	—	3–0	3–2	7–2	3–1	2–1	0–3	3–1	0–1
Boldurești	3–0	0–8	—	2–2	0–6	1–5	1–2	1–7	0–2	0–6
Codru-Juniori	5–2	1–1	1–0	—	2–4	1–2	0–1	2–1	1–1	0–3
Cricova	5–0	0–5	6–1	1–4	—	1–3	6–1	1–8	0–4	1–2
Fulger Ialoveni	3–0	3–0	2–0	2–0	4–0	—	4–1	0–2	3–4	2–2
Sinteza Căușeni	3–0	0–4	0–3	1–2	2–1	1–1	—	1–5	1–8	0–3
Sireți	12–2	2–1	2–1	4–0	2–0	2–0	5–1	—	1–1	1–1
Steaua-57 Chișinău	3–0	2–1	7–0	4–1	7–1	2–0	8–1	1–2	—	2–3
Tighina	8–1	6–2	2–1	5–1	6–0	1–0	5–0	0–1	2–1	—

Source: FMF (in Romanian)
Legend: Blue = home team win; Yellow = draw; Red = away team win.

== South ==
Pos	Team	Pld	W	D	L	GF	GA	GD	Pts	Promotion or relegation
1	Sparta Chișinău (C, P)	16	13	3	0	47	9	+38	42	Promotion to Divizia A
2	Fortuna Pleșeni	16	10	2	4	39	22	+17	32	
3	Fîrlădeni	16	9	1	6	39	13	+26	28	withdrew (Note: Fîrlădeni completed the season but withdrew from the league prior to the start of the next season.)
4	Olimp Comrat	16	8	2	6	37	34	+3	26	
5	Maiak Chirsova	16	6	4	6	22	25	−3	22	
6	Congaz	16	6	3	7	27	27	0	21	
7	Slobozia Mare	16	5	2	9	26	34	−8	17	
8	Prut Leova	16	3	2	11	22	59	−37	11	withdrew (Note: Prut Leova completed the season but withdrew from the league prior to the start of the next season.)
9	Sokol Copceac	16	1	3	12	19	55	−36	6	withdrew (Note: Sokol Copceac completed the season but withdrew from the league prior to the start of the next season.)

Source: FMF, Soccerway
Rules for classification: 1) Points; 2) Head-to-head points; 3) Head-to-head goal difference; 4) Head-to-head away goals scored; 5) Head-to-head goals scored; 6) Matches won; 7) Goal difference; 8) Goals scored; 9) Less yellow cards; 10) Less red cards.
1. Ceadîr-Lunga withdrew from the league after round 4 and their results were annulled.
(C) Champions; (P) Promoted

=== Results ===
The schedule consists of two rounds, each team plays each other once home-and-away for a total of 16 matches per team.

Home \ Away	CON	FÎR	FOR	MAI	OLI	PRU	SLO	SOK	SPA
Congaz	—	3–0	1–2	4–1	2–2	5–3	4–0	0–0	0–1
Fîrlădeni	5–0	—	1–2	6–0	2–1	8–0	3–0	3–0	0–2
Fortuna Pleșeni	0–1	1–3	—	7–1	2–1	5–1	5–3	4–1	0–0
Maiak Chirsova	4–1	1–0	3–0	—	3–1	5–0	0–1	0–0	1–1
Olimp Comrat	3–2	1–0	0–4	0–0	—	5–0	1–0	7–2	0–2
Prut Leova	2–0	1–2	1–1	0–1	3–4	—	4–3	3–0	1–1
Slobozia Mare	1–1	0–0	1–2	1–0	2–4	4–1	—	5–1	0–2
Sokol Copceac	0–1	0–6	0–4	2–2	3–6	4–2	3–4	—	1–5
Sparta Chișinău	3–2	1–0	4–0	1–0	7–1	11–0	3–1	3–2	—

Source: FMF (in Romanian)
Legend: Blue = home team win; Yellow = draw; Red = away team win.
