= 2019 Moldovan "A" Division =

Divizia A
- Season: 2019
- Dates: 6 April 2019 – 9 November 2019
- Champions: Florești
- Promoted: Florești; Dacia Buiucani
- Relegated: Sîngerei
- Matches: 210
- Goals: 826 (3.93 per match)
- Top goalscorer: Artiom Litviacov (30 goals)
- Best goalkeeper: Dumitru Coval (12 clean sheets)
- Biggest home win: Tighina 13–0 Sireți (1 September 2019)
- Biggest away win: Sparta 0–12 Tighina (22 June 2019)
- Highest scoring: Zaria 10–3 Ungheni (27 April 2019); Tighina 13–0 Sireți (1 September 2019)
- Longest winning run: 12 matches Florești
- Longest unbeaten run: 17 matches Florești
- Longest winless run: 28 matches Sparta
- Longest losing run: 25 matches Sparta

The 2019 Moldovan "A" Division (Romanian: Divizia A) was the 29th season of Moldovan football's second-tier league. The season started on 6 April 2019 and ended on 9 November 2019.

== Teams ==

Club	Location
Cahul-2005	Cahul
Dacia Buiucani	Chișinău
Florești	Florești
Grănicerul	Glodeni
Iskra	Rîbnița
Real Succes	Chișinău
Sîngerei	Sîngerei
Sireți	Sireți
Sparta	Chișinău
Spartanii	Selemet
Speranța	Drochia
Tighina	Bender
Ungheni	Ungheni
Victoria	Chișinău
Zaria	Bălți

== Season summary ==
=== League table ===
Pos	Team	Pld	W	D	L	GF	GA	GD	Pts	Promotion or relegation
1	Florești (C, P)	28	22	3	3	71	29	+42	69 (Note: Florești ahead of Dacia Buiucani on head-to-head points: Florești–Dacia Buiucani 2–1, Dacia Buiucani–Florești 1–2)	Promotion to Divizia Națională
2	Dacia Buiucani (P)	28	22	3	3	68	17	+51	69	Promotion to Divizia Națională
3	Spartanii Selemet	28	20	2	6	72	28	+44	62	Qualification to Promotion play-off
4	Tighina	28	19	3	6	84	31	+53	60	
5	Cahul-2005	28	14	6	8	60	34	+26	48	
6	Victoria Chișinău	28	14	1	13	58	54	+4	43	
7	Speranța Drochia	28	12	5	11	44	37	+7	41	
8	Grănicerul Glodeni	28	10	4	14	47	66	−19	34	
9	Sireți	28	10	3	15	48	83	−35	33	
10	Zaria Bălți	28	9	4	15	65	60	+5	31 (Note: Head-to-head points: Zaria 10, Iskra 4, Real Succes 3)	
11	Iskra Rîbnița	28	9	4	15	51	62	−11	31	
12	Real Succes	28	9	4	15	59	63	−4	31	
13	Ungheni	28	9	3	16	55	83	−28	30	withdrew (Note: As per regulations, the thirteenth placed team, Ungheni was to be relegated to Divizia B, but the club withdrew before the start of the next season.)
14	Sîngerei (R)	28	6	3	19	38	72	−34	21	Relegation to Divizia B
15	Sparta Chișinău	28	0	2	26	6	107	−101	2	withdrew (Note: Sparta Chișinău withdrew from the league after round 14. All remaining fixtures are awarded 0–3 against them.)

Source: FMF, Soccerway
Rules for classification: 1) Points; 2) Head-to-head points; 3) Head-to-head goal difference; 4) Head-to-head away goals scored; 5) Head-to-head goals scored; 6) Matches won; 7) Goal difference; 8) Goals scored; 9) Less red cards; 10) Less yellow cards.
(C) Champions; (P) Promoted; (R) Relegated

=== Results ===
Teams will play each other twice (once home, once away).

Home \ Away	CAH	DAC	FLO	GRĂ	ISK	REA	SÎN	SIR	SPC	SPS	SPE	TIG	UNG	VIC	ZAR
Cahul-2005	—	1–2	0–1	2–2	3–0	3–1	0–0	3–1	4–0	0–1	4–0	2–2	2–0	1–3	2–0
Dacia Buiucani	1–0	—	1–2	2–0	3–1	2–0	5–0	3–1	5–1	2–0	3–2	0–1	7–0	3–1	1–0
Florești	2–0	2–1	—	0–0	2–3	5–1	5–1	7–0	3–0 (Note: Technical wins/losses)	3–2	3–1	1–0	2–1	2–1	3–0
Grănicerul Glodeni	1–4	0–0	2–0	—	4–1	1–3	2–1	1–0	3–0	0–4	0–1	1–3	7–4	1–3	4–3
Iskra Rîbnița	1–1	1–3	1–2	2–0	—	4–2	6–1	1–5	3–0	4–6	0–0	2–4	3–4	1–0	1–1
Real Succes	3–3	0–2	0–2	2–2	4–3	—	2–3	4–0	3–0	0–3 (Note: Real Succes received a 0–3 technical loss in a home game against Spartanii Selemet due to violation of regulations. The original match ended in a 1–1 draw.)	2–1	0–4	2–3	3–0	0–2
Sîngerei	0–3 (Note: Sîngerei received a 0–3 technical loss in a home game against Cahul-2005. The match was not played due to unsatisfactory pitch condition.)	1–1	1–3	2–4	0–2	0–1	—	0–2	1–1	0–4	0–2	2–4	4–2	2–1	7–2
Sireți	2–6	0–1	2–2	5–2	4–3	1–5	6–2	—	3–0	0–3	0–1	2–0	1–1	1–5	1–4
Sparta Chișinău	0–3	0–3	0–2	0–1	1–3	0–10	0–3	1–4	—	0–3	0–4	0–12	0–3	0–3	0–3
Spartanii Selemet	1–3	1–2	1–2	5–0	1–0	2–1	2–1	1–1	11–0	—	3–0	1–0	2–1	3–0 (Note: Victoria Chișinău received a 0–3 technical loss in a away game against Spartanii Selemet due to violation of regulations. The original match ended in a 1–0 victory for Victoria Chișinău.)	3–2
Speranța Drochia	1–2	0–0	4–3	3–0	1–1	1–1	2–0	7–0	3–0	0–2	—	0–3	1–0	0–1	2–1
Tighina	3–1	0–2	1–2	5–2	1–0	5–2	3–2	13–0	3–0	0–0	3–1	—	4–2	2–1	3–1
Ungheni	2–4	1–6	1–2	5–3	1–2	3–3	3–1	1–3	3–0 (Note: Sparta Chișinău received a 0–3 technical loss in a away game against Ungheni due to violation of regulations. The original match ended in a 1–0 victory for Ungheni.)	3–4	2–2	1–0	—	2–0	1–7
Victoria Chișinău	3–2	1–3	1–5	4–1	6–2	4–3	0–1	1–3	5–2	1–0	3–2	2–2	1–2	—	2–1
Zaria Bălți	1–1	0–4	3–3	2–3	2–0	4–1	4–2	5–0	0–0	2–3	0–2	1–3	10–3	4–5	—

Source: FMF (in Romanian)
Legend: Blue = home team win; Yellow = draw; Red = away team win.

== Results by round ==
The following table represents the teams game results in each round.

Team	1	2	3	4	5	6	7	8	9	10	11	12	13	14	15	16	17	18	19	20	21	22	23	24	25	26	27	28
Cahul-2005	L	L	W	L	L	D	W	D	W (Note: Technical win)	W	W	L	W	W	W	L	W	D	W	W	D	W	D	D	L	L	W	W
Dacia Buiucani	W	W	W	W	W	W	W	W	W	W	W	D	W	L	W	L	W	W	W	D	D	W	W	W	W	W	W	L
Florești	W	W	D	W	L	W	W	W	W	W	W	W	W	W	W	W	W	D	D	W	W	W	L	L	W	W	W	W
Grănicerul Glodeni	L	W	L	L	W	L	L	L	L	D	W	W	W	L	L	W	L	L	D	W	L	D	D	L	L	W	W	W
Iskra Rîbnița	W	W	W	D	L	L	W	L	L	W	L	L	D	W	W	L	W	L	D	L	L	W	L	L	D	L	L	L
Real Succes	L	D	L	L	D	W	L	W	L	L	W	W	W	L	L	L	L	L	L	W	L	D	W	L	W	W	D	L (Note: Technical loss)
Sîngerei	L	W	D	L	L	L	W	L	L	W	L	L	W	L	L	W	W	L	L	L	L	L	D	D	L	L	L	L
Sireți	L	D	D	W	W	L	L	L	L	L	W	W	L	W	L	L	L	D	L	L	L	L	L	W	W	W	W	W
Sparta Chișinău	D	L	D	L	L	L	L	L	L	L	L	L	L	L	L	L	L	L	L	L	L	L	L	L	L	L	L	L
Spartanii Selemet	W	D	W	W	W	W	L	W	W	L	W	W	L	W	L	W	W	W	W	W	W	W	W	L	W	D	L	W
Speranța Drochia	W	W	W	W	D	L	W	L	L	W	L	D	L	L	W	W	W	W	D	L	W	L	W	D	L	L	D	L
Tighina	L	W	W	L	W	W	W	W	W	W	W	L	L	L	W	W	D	W	W	W	W	W	D	W	W	D	L	W
Ungheni	L	D	L	L	L	W	L	L	W	W	L	L	L	W	L	W	L	D	L	L	W	W	W	W	D	L	L	L
Victoria Chișinău	W	L	L	W	W	W	L	L	L	L	W	W	L	W	W	L	W	W	W	L	L	L	D	L	W	W	L	W
Zaria Bălți	D	L	L	L	W	L	L	W	W	L	L	L	D	L	W	L	L	D	W	L	L	W	D	W	L	W	W	L

== Top goalscorers ==
Rank	Player	Club	Goals
1	(Moldova) Artiom Litviacov	Tighina	30
2	(Moldova) Octavian Onofrei	Spartanii	29
3	(Moldova) Eugeniu Borovschi	Iskra	20
4	(Moldova) Oleg Andronic	Ungheni	16
4	(Moldova) Vadim Crîcimari	Florești	16
6	(Moldova) Alexandru Bezimov	Victoria	14
6	(Moldova) Igor Bîcicov	Sîngerei	14
6	(Ivory Coast) Abdoul Fadika	Zaria	14
6	(Moldova) Vladimir Haritov	Cahul-2005	14
10	(Moldova) Andrian Apostol	Dacia Buiucani	13
10	(Moldova) Marius Iosipoi	Dacia Buiucani	13
10	(Moldova) Andrei Stratan	Ungheni	13

== Clean sheets ==
Rank	Player	Club	Clean sheets
1	(Moldova) Dumitru Coval	Dacia Buiucani	12
2	(Moldova) Sergiu Nicolaev	Speranța	11
3	(Moldova) Ion Rîmbu	Florești	8
4	(Moldova) Denis Cristofovici	Grănicerul	5
4	(Moldova) Evgheni Gorbunov	Cahul-2005	5
4	(Moldova) Eugeniu Madan	Sireți (1) & Spartanii (4)	5
7	(Moldova) Anatolie Cebotari	Iskra	4
7	(Moldova) Anton Coval	Tighina	4
7	(Moldova) Stanislav Samson	Tighina (3) & Sîngerei (1)	4
10	(Moldova) Ruslan Istrati	Ungheni	3
10	(Moldova) Nicolae Țurcan	Spartanii	3
10	(Moldova) Andrei Vicol	Victoria	3
