= Alexandru Bejan =

Moldovan footballer

Personal information
- Date of birth: 7 May 1996 (age 30)
- Place of birth: Chișinău, Moldova
- Height: 1.77 m (5 ft 9 1/2 in)
- Position: Midfielder

Youth career
- Dacia-2 Buiucani

Senior career*
Years	Team	Apps	(Gls)
2012–2017	Dacia Chișinău	92	(16)
2018	Dinamo-Auto	9	(2)
2018–2023	Petrocub Hîncești	88	(8)
2021–2022	→ Zimbru Chișinău (loan)	16	(4)

International career
2012	Moldova U17	3	(1)
2013–2014	Moldova U19	6	(1)
2015–2018	Moldova U21	9	(0)
- * Club domestic league appearances and goals

Alexandru Bejan (born 7 May 1996) is a Moldovan former footballer who played as a midfielder.

== Club career ==
Bejan started his career with Dacia Chișinău, where he made his senior debut at the age of 16 in 2012. In March 2018, after Dacia Chișinău were dissolved, Bejan signed for Dinamo-Auto Tiraspol. In August 2018, he moved to Petrocub Hîncești. In September 2021, he joined Zimbru Chișinău on loan.

== International career ==
In March 2021, he was called up to the Moldova national team for the first time.

== Honours ==
Petrocub Hîncești

- Moldovan Cup: 2019–20
