= Valeriu Lazăr =

Moldovan economist and politician (born 1968)

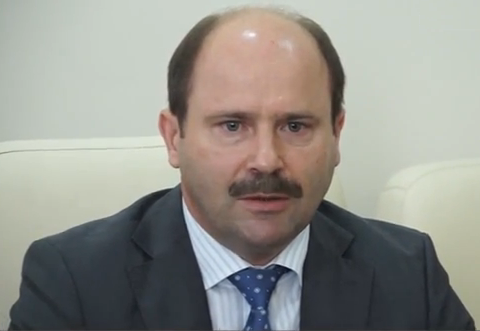
- Lazăr in 2015

Minister of Economy
- In office 25 September 2009 – 3 July 2014
- President: Mihai Ghimpu (acting); Vlad Filat (acting); Marian Lupu (acting); Nicolae Timofti
- Prime Minister: Vlad Filat; Iurie Leancă
- Preceded by: Igor Dodon
- Succeeded by: Andrian Candu
- In office 19 April 2005 – 18 September 2006
- President: Vladimir Voronin
- Prime Minister: Vasile Tarlev
- Preceded by: Marian Lupu
- Succeeded by: Igor Dodon

Deputy Prime Minister of Moldova
- In office 25 September 2009 – 30 May 2013 Serving with: Iurie Leancă
- President: Mihai Ghimpu (acting); Vlad Filat (acting); Marian Lupu (acting); Nicolae Timofti
- Prime Minister: Vlad Filat
- Succeeded by: Andrian Candu

Deputy Minister of Economy
- In office 18 February 2004 – 19 April 2005
- President: Vladimir Voronin
- Prime Minister: Vasile Tarlev
- Minister: Marian Lupu

First Deputy Minister of State
- In office 22 March 1999 – 27 December 1999
- President: Petru Lucinschi
- Prime Minister: Ion Sturza; Dumitru Braghiș
- Minister: Vlad Filat

Personal details
- Born: 20 May 1968 (age 58) Mingir, Moldavian SSR, Soviet Union
- Party: Democratic Party of Moldova
- Education: State Agrarian University of Moldova

Valeriu Lazăr (born 20 May 1968) is a Moldovan politician who served as deputy prime minister and minister of economy in the First Vlad Filat Cabinet, Second Filat Cabinet and in the Iurie Leancă Cabinet as well. On 2 July 2014 he resigned from the office of minister of economy.

Lazăr is a member of the Democratic Party of Moldova.
