= Iaser Țurcan =

Moldovan footballer (born 1998)

Personal information
- Date of birth: 7 January 1998 (age 28)
- Place of birth: Athens, Greece
- Position: Midfielder

Team information
- Current team: Ballard
- Number: 28

Senior career*
Years	Team	Apps	(Gls)
2015–2018	Dacia Chișinău	2	(0)
2017	→ Academia Chișinău (loan)	13	(0)
2017–2018	→ Dinamo-Auto Tiraspol (loan)	34	(1)
2019–2023	Petrocub Hîncești	75	(13)
2021	→ Universitatea Cluj (loan)	2	(0)
2024–	Ballard	0	(0)

International career^{‡}
2014	Moldova U17	3	(0)
2016	Moldova U19	2	(0)
2018–2020	Moldova U21	9	(0)
2019–2022	Moldova	7	(0)
- * Club domestic league appearances and goals as of 18 March 2024 ‡ National team caps and goals as of 25 August 2024

Iaser Țurcan (born 7 January 1998) is a Moldovan footballer who plays as a midfielder for USL League Two club Ballard and the Moldova national team.

== Career ==
Țurcan made his international debut for Moldova on 21 February 2019, starting in a friendly match against Kazakhstan before being substituted out for Valeriu Macrițchii in the 88th minute, with the match finishing as a 1–0 loss.

== Career statistics ==
=== International ===
As of 25 August 2024

Moldova
Year	Apps	Goals
2019	4	0
2020	2	0
2021	0	0
2022	1	0
Total	7	0

== Honours ==
Dacia Chișinău

- Moldovan Super Liga runner-up: 2015–16

Petrocub Hîncești

- Moldovan Super Liga runner-up: 2020–21, 2021–22, 2022–23
- Moldovan Cup: 2019–20
