= Ovye Monday Shedrack =

Nigerian footballer

Ovye Monday
Personal information
- Full name: Ovye Monday Shedrack
- Date of birth: 14 August 1992 (age 34)
- Place of birth: Lafia, Nigeria
- Height: 1.92 m (6 ft 3 1/2 in)
- Position: Centre back

Team information
- Current team: Gloria Băneasa (on loan from CS Eforie)

Senior career*
Years	Team	Apps	(Gls)
2013–2016	Milsami Orhei	57	(3)
2016	Al-Arabi	0	(0)
2016–2017	Zimbru Chișinău	25	(1)
2017–2018	Zimbru-2 Chișinău		
2018	TP-47	5	(0)
2018–2019	Sur		
2019	Carmen București	12	(2)
2020	Dacia Unirea Brăila	13	(1)
2021–	Eforie	9	
2021–2022	→ Flacăra Horezu (loan)	9	(0)
2022	→ Făurei (loan)	2	(1)
2022–2023	→ Gloria Băneasa (loan)	12	(2)
- * Club domestic league appearances and goals as of 09:28, 30 November 2013 (UTC)

Ovye Monday Shedrack (born 14 August 1992) is a Nigerian football player who plays as a center back for Romanian Liga III club Gloria Băneasa, on loan from CS Eforie.

== Career ==
In January 2017, Shedrack went on trial with Kazakhstan Premier League side Shakhter Karagandy.

After a spell at Finnish club TP-47 in the first half of the 2018 season, Shedrack moved to Omani club Sur SC in August 2018. In 2019, he played for Romanian club Carmen București.

In April 2021, Shedrack signed with Romanian club CS Eforie.

== Career statistics ==
=== Club ===
As of match played 1 October 2017

Appearances and goals by club, season and competition
Club	Season	League			National Cup		Continental		Other		Total	
Club	Season	Division	Apps	Goals	Apps	Goals	Apps	Goals	Apps	Goals	Apps	Goals
Milsami Orhei	2012–13	Divizia Națională	11	0	1	0	-		-		12	0
Milsami Orhei	2013–14	Divizia Națională	13	1	0	0	4	0	-		17	1
Milsami Orhei	2014–15	Divizia Națională	22	2	1	0	4	0	-		27	2
Milsami Orhei	2015–16	Divizia Națională	11	0	1	0	1	0	-		13	0
Milsami Orhei	Total		57	3	3	0	9	0	-	-	69	0
Zimbru Chișinău	2016–17	Divizia Națională	14	0	2	0	–		–		16	0
Zimbru Chișinău	2017	Divizia Națională	11	1	0	0	-		-		11	1
Zimbru Chișinău	Total		25	1	2	0	-	-	-	-	27	1
Career total			82	4	5	0	9	0	-	-	96	1
