= Donalio Melachio Douanla =

Cameroonian footballer

Personal information
- Date of birth: 24 September 1997 (age 29)
- Place of birth: Bafoussam, Cameroon
- Height: 1.78 m (5 ft 10 in)
- Position: Defender

Team information
- Current team: Abu Muslim FC

Senior career*
Years	Team	Apps	(Gls)
2017–2022	Petrocub Hîncești	98	(1)
2022–2023	Arta/Solar7	6	(2)
2023–2025	Petrocub Hîncești	25	(1)
- * Club domestic league appearances and goals

Donalio Melachio Douanla (born 24 September 1997) is a Cameroonian professional footballer who plays as a defender.

== Career ==
Douanla began in Petrocub Hîncești's senior squad in the 2016–17 season, making three appearances as the Moldovan National Division club placed sixth; with his first match coming against eventual champions Sheriff Tiraspol on 3 May 2017. He subsequently featured a further thirteen times in the following campaign of 2017. His first Petrocub goal arrived on 31 October 2018 during a win over Milsami Orhei in the Moldovan Cup, a competition he and the club would go on to win in 2020.

== Career statistics ==
As of match played 26 May 2021.

Appearances and goals by club, season and competition
Club	Season	League			Cup		League Cup		Continental		Other		Total	
Club	Season	Division	Apps	Goals	Apps	Goals	Apps	Goals	Apps	Goals	Apps	Goals	Apps	Goals
Petrocub Hîncești	2016–17	National Division	3	0	0	0	—		—		0	0	3	0
Petrocub Hîncești	2017	National Division	13	0	0	0	—		—		0	0	13	0
Petrocub Hîncești	2018	National Division	23	0	3	1	—		2 (Note: Appearance(s) in the UEFA Europa League)	0	0	0	28	1
Petrocub Hîncești	2019	National Division	22	0	2	0	—		1	0	0	0	25	0
Petrocub Hîncești	2020–21	National Division	27	1	5	0	—		1	0	0	0	33	1
Career total			88	1	10	1	—		4	0	0	0	102	2

== Honours ==
Petrocub Hîncești

- Moldovan Cup: 2019–20
