= Cioropcani =

- Commune
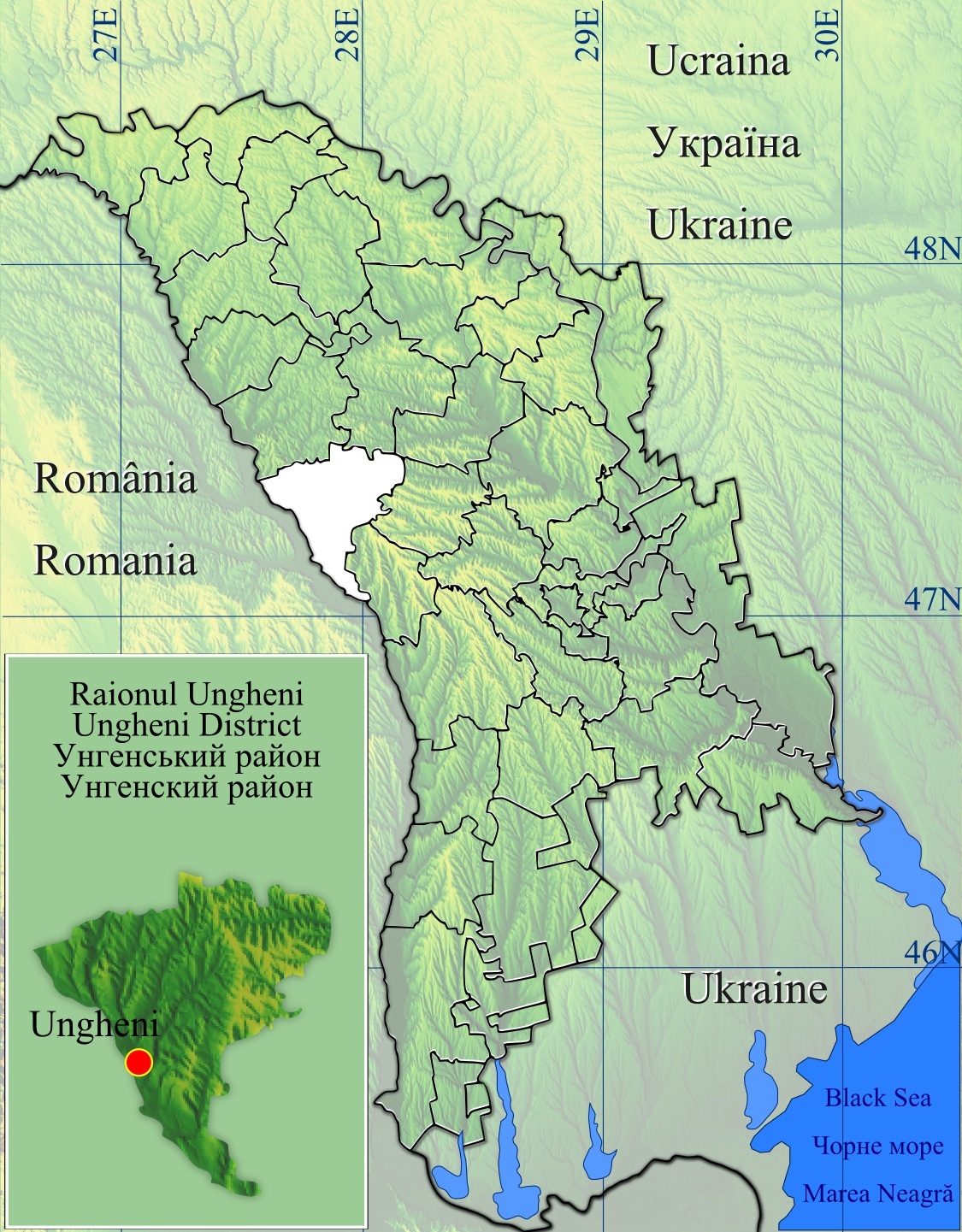
- Location within Ungheni
- Coordinates: 47°23′42″N 27°41′52″E
- Country: Moldova

Government
  - Mayor: Vizitiu Tudor

Population (2014)
  - Total: 2,467
- Time zone: UTC+2 (EET)
  - Summer (DST): UTC+3 (EEST)
- Postal code: MD-3619

Cioropcani is a commune in Ungheni District, Moldova. It is composed of three villages: Bulhac, Cioropcani and Stolniceni.
