= Pepeni =

- Commune
- Location within Moldova
- Coordinates: 47.6422222222°N 28.3491666667°E
- Country: Moldova
- District: Sîngerei District

Population (2014)
  - Total: 5,594
- Time zone: UTC+2 (EET)
  - Summer (DST): UTC+3 (EEST)
- Website: http://iatp.md/pepeni/

Pepeni is a commune in Sîngerei District, Moldova. It is composed of four villages: Pepeni, Pepenii Noi, Răzălăi and Romanovca.
