= Mingir =

- Commune
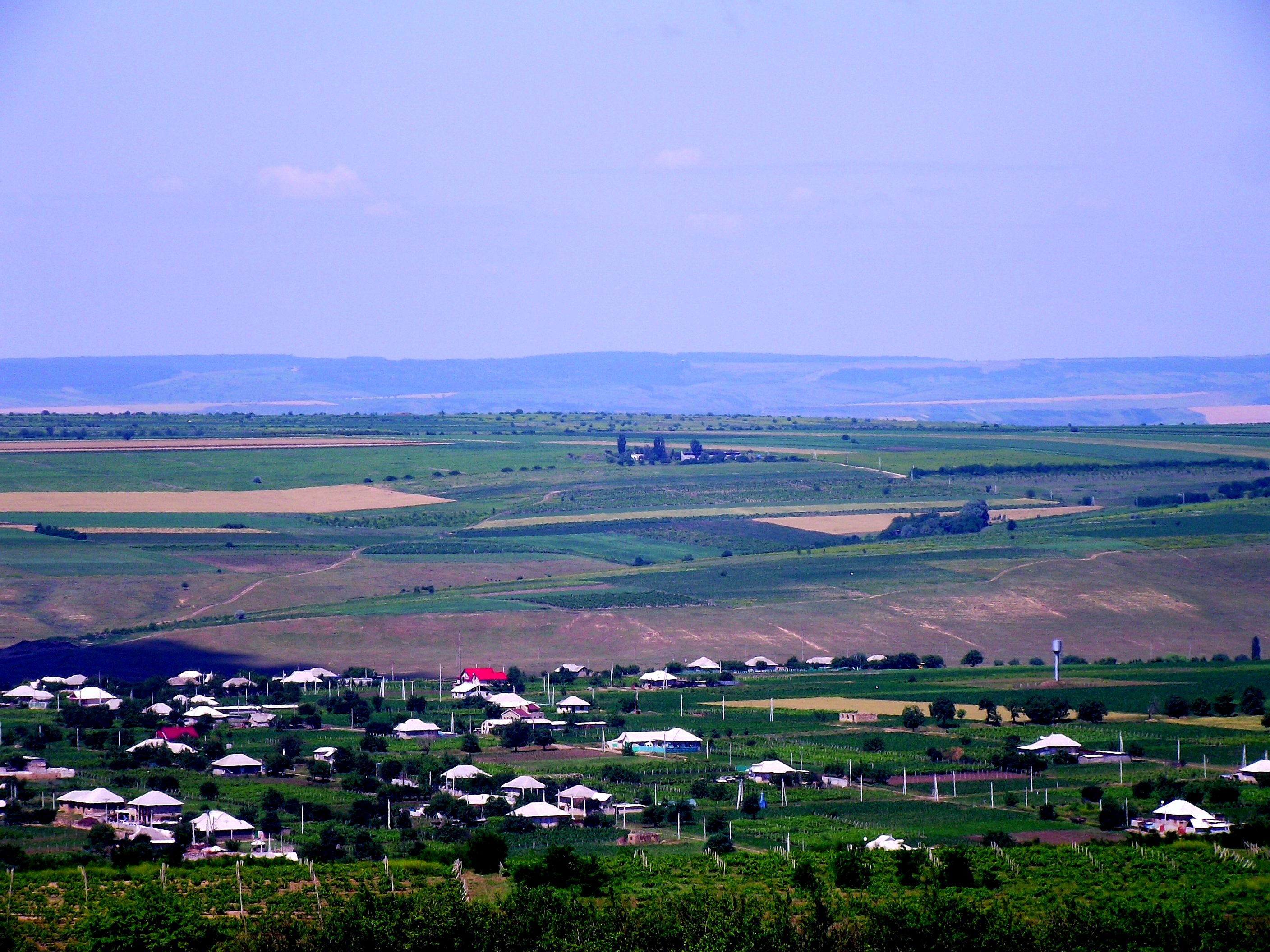
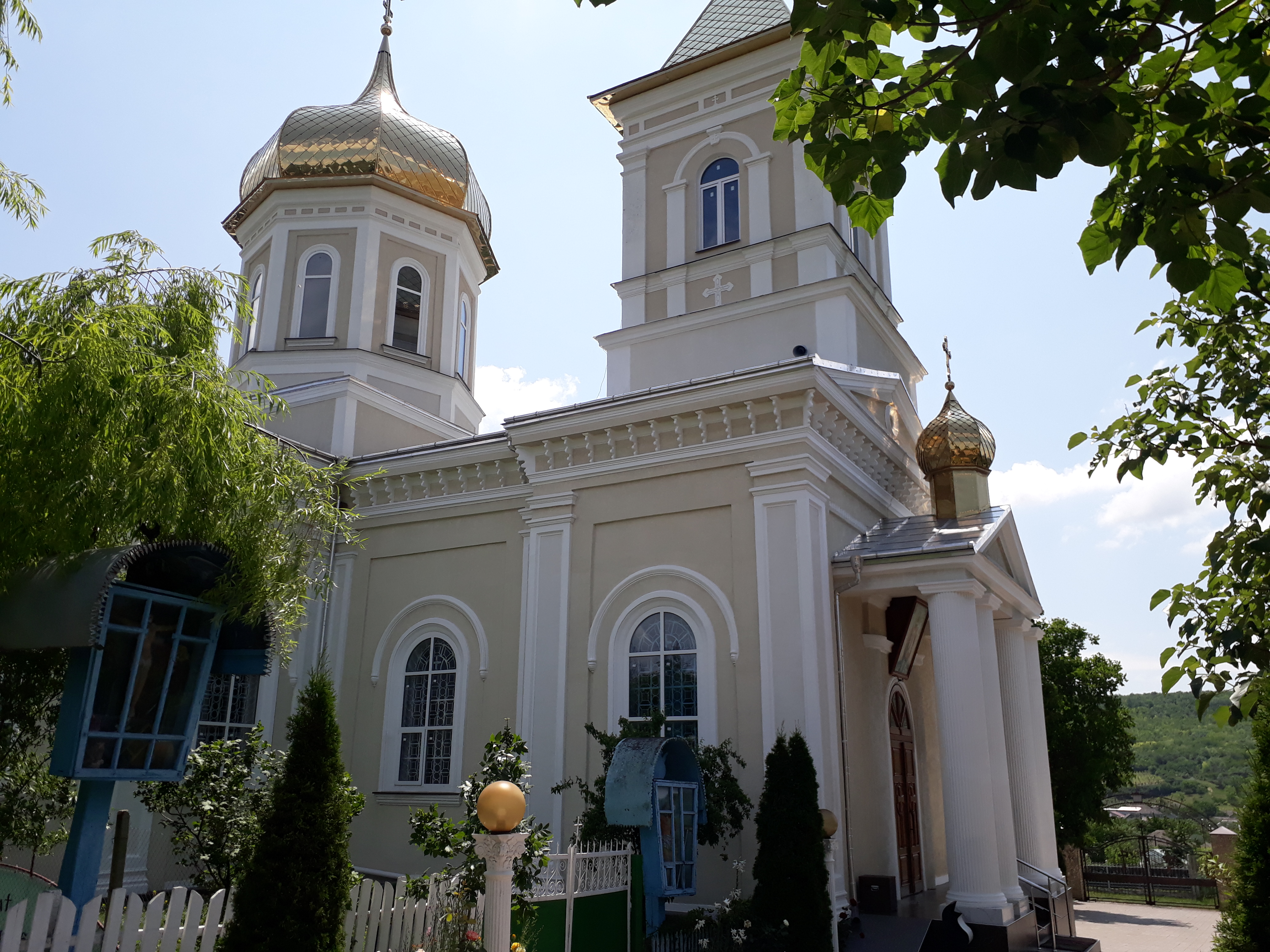
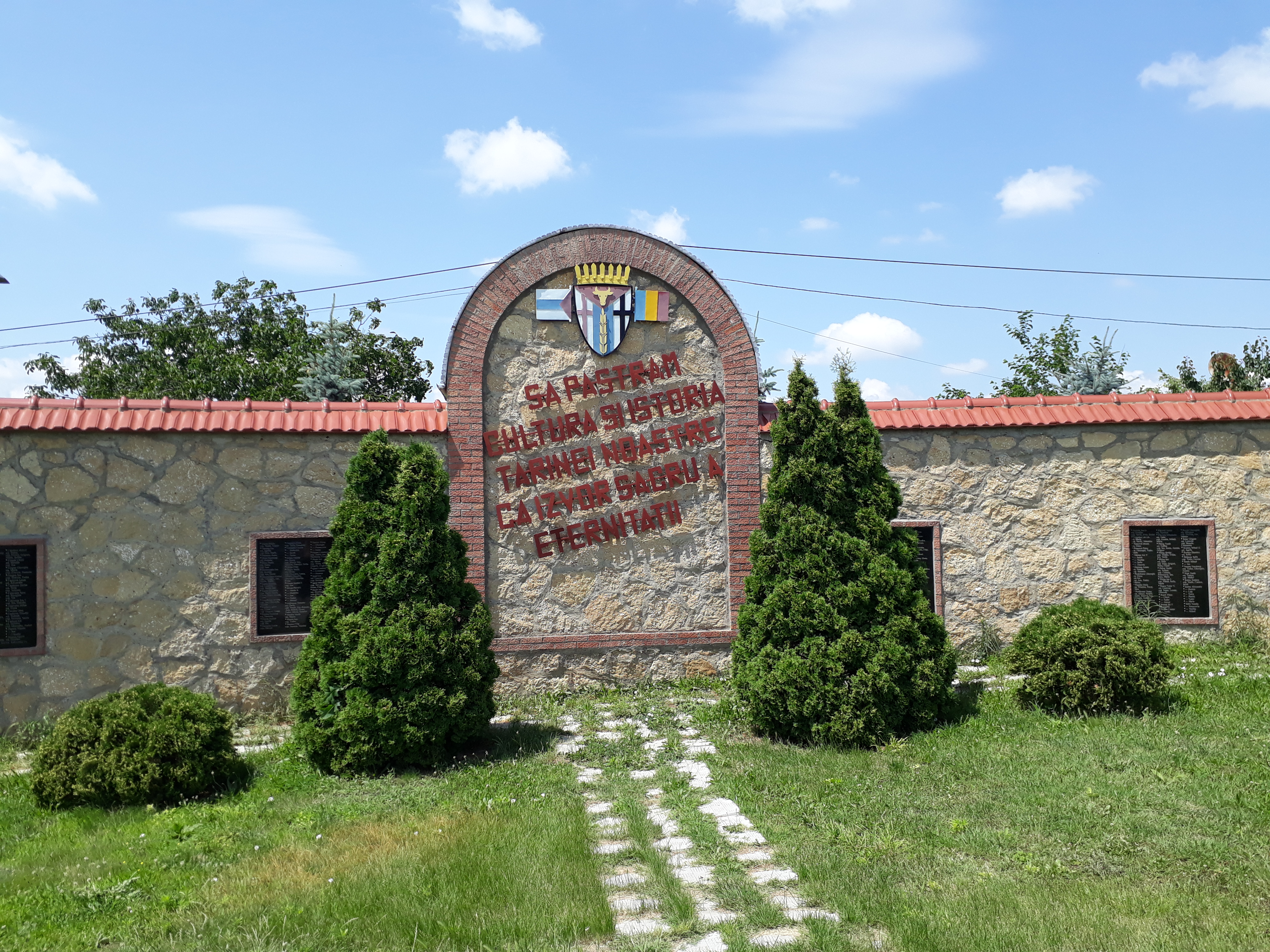
- From the top, View over Mingir, Saint Nicholas church, The Memorial Complex

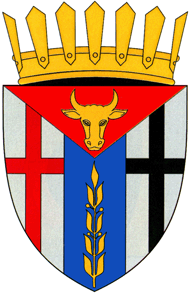
- Flag Coat of arms

- Location in Moldova
- Coordinates: 46°40′N 28°20′E
- Country: Moldova
- District: Hîncești District

Area
  - Total: 75.91 km^{2} (29.31 sq mi)
- Elevation: 52 m (171 ft)

Population (2014)
  - Total: 4,872
  - Density: 64.18/km^{2} (166.2/sq mi)
- Time zone: UTC+2 (EET)
  - Summer (DST): UTC+3 (EEST)
- Postal code: MD-3436
- Area code: +373 269

Mingir is a commune in Hîncești District, Moldova, composed of the villages of Mingir and Semionovca.

Located in the central-western part of Moldova, Mingir is one of the largest rural communes in Hîncești District by area. The locality is situated in a region historically associated with the forests and rolling landscapes of central Moldova and has long been recognized for its agricultural traditions, community spirit, and cultural heritage.

With a documented history dating back to the late 15th century, Mingir is among the oldest rural settlements in the region. Over the centuries, the village developed as an important agricultural community whose residents were engaged primarily in farming, livestock breeding, viticulture, and traditional crafts. Many local customs, folklore traditions, and religious celebrations have been preserved and continue to be practiced by the inhabitants of the commune.

The commune is home to several landmarks that reflect its historical and cultural identity, including Saint Nicholas Church, the Mingir Memorial Complex, and other monuments dedicated to important events and personalities connected to the village. These sites serve as symbols of the community's historical continuity and local pride.

Mingir has produced a number of notable Moldovan public figures, artists, athletes, educators, and political leaders who have contributed to the development of the Republic of Moldova. The village is particularly known as the birthplace of Olympic weightlifting champion Tudor Casapu, folk music promoter Nicolae Gribincea, and politician Valeriu Lazăr.

Today, Mingir remains an active and vibrant rural commune whose residents continue to contribute to Moldova's agricultural, cultural, and economic life. Strong ties with the village's diaspora communities around the world help preserve local traditions, support community initiatives, and maintain connections between former residents and their native village. The commune is widely regarded for its hospitality, rich cultural heritage, and enduring connection to the traditions of rural Moldova.

== Notable people ==
- Valeriu Lazăr
- Nicolae Gribincea
- Tudor Casapu

== Bibliography ==
- Lupanciuc, Iacob, Comuna Mingir: File de istorie, Chișinău, Editura Universul, 2004, ISBN 978-9975-944-75-5
