= Maxim Iurcu =

Moldovan footballer

Personal information
- Date of birth: 1 February 1993 (age 33)
- Place of birth: Bender, Moldova
- Height: 1.84 m (6 ft 0 in)
- Position: Forward

Youth career
- –2011: Sheriff Tiraspol

Senior career*
| Years | Team | Apps | (Gls) |
| 2011–2016 | Sheriff Tiraspol | 29 | (5) |
| 2012–2014 | → Dinamo-Auto (loan) | 31 | (5) |
| 2017 | Speranța Nisporeni | 10 | (0) |
| 2017 | Qizilqum Zarafshon | 2 | (0) |
| 2017–2019 | Speranța Nisporeni | 62 | (15) |
| 2020 | Sfântul Gheorghe | 8 | (1) |
| 2020–2021 | SCM Gloria Buzău | 21 | (4) |
| 2021 | FC Brașov | 12 | (1) |
| 2021–2022 | Petrocub Hîncești | ? | (?) |
| 2022 | Einherji | ? | (?) |

International career
| 2008–2009 | Moldova U-17 | 5 | (1) |
| 2010–2011 | Moldova U-19 | 6 | (3) |
- * Club domestic league appearances and goals as of 07:36, 26 January 2022 (UTC)

Maxim Iurcu is a Moldovan footballer who plays as a forward.

== Honours ==
Sheriff Tiraspol

- Divizia Națională (2): 2011–12, 2015–16,
- Moldovan Cup (1): 2014–15
- Moldovan Super Cup (1): 2015, 2016
