= Sănătăuca =

- Village
- Location within Moldova
- Coordinates: 48.0133333333°N 28.6730555556°E
- Country: Moldova
- District: Florești District

Government
  - Mayor: Tudor Chibidoc (PCRM)

Population (2014 census)
  - Total: 2,293
- Time zone: UTC+2 (EET)
  - Summer (DST): UTC+3 (EEST)

Sănătăuca is a village in Florești District, Moldova.

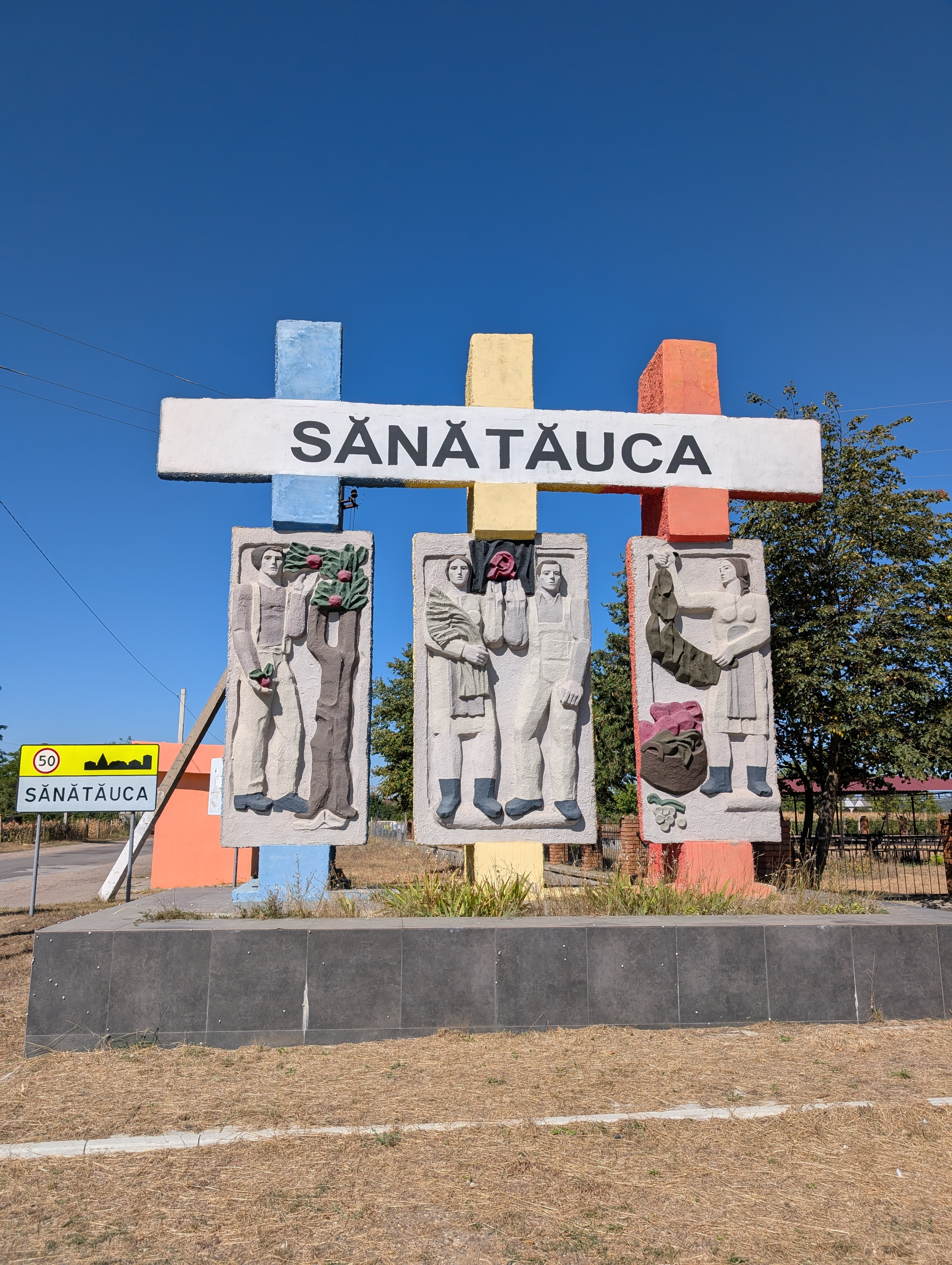
Entrance of Sănătăuca in 2025

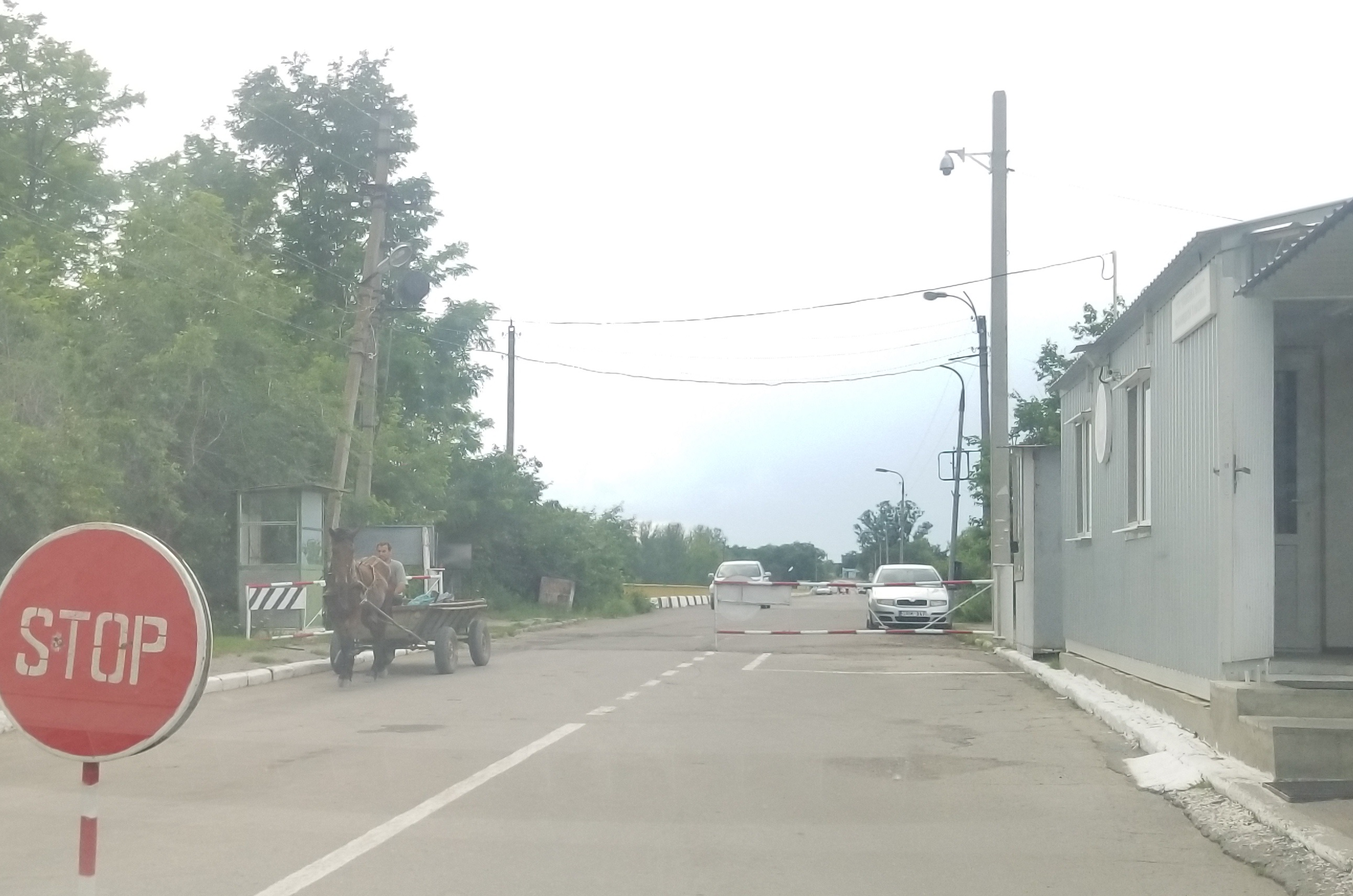
Border checkpoint with Transnistria at Sănătăuca bridge

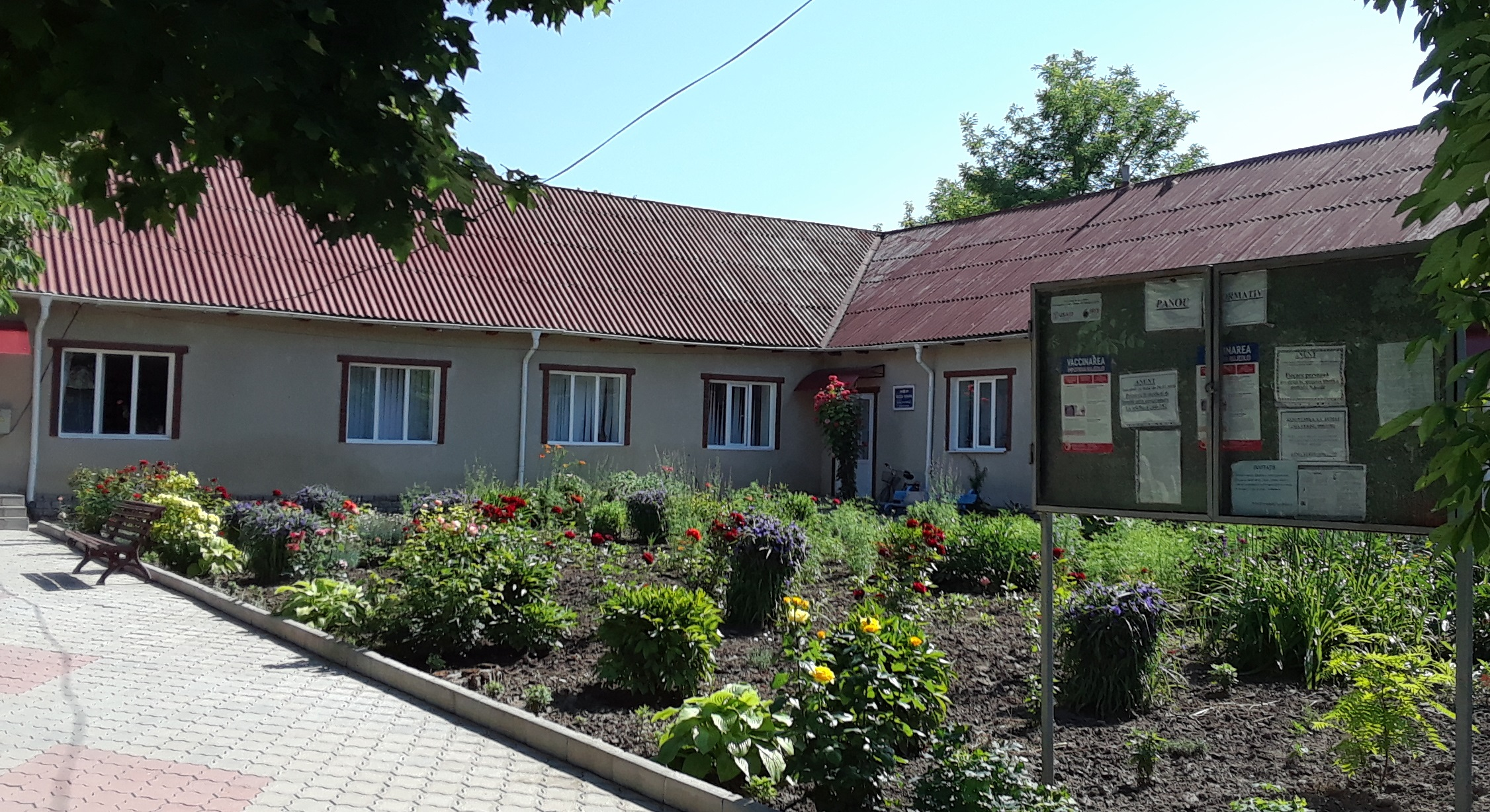
Sănătăuca medical center

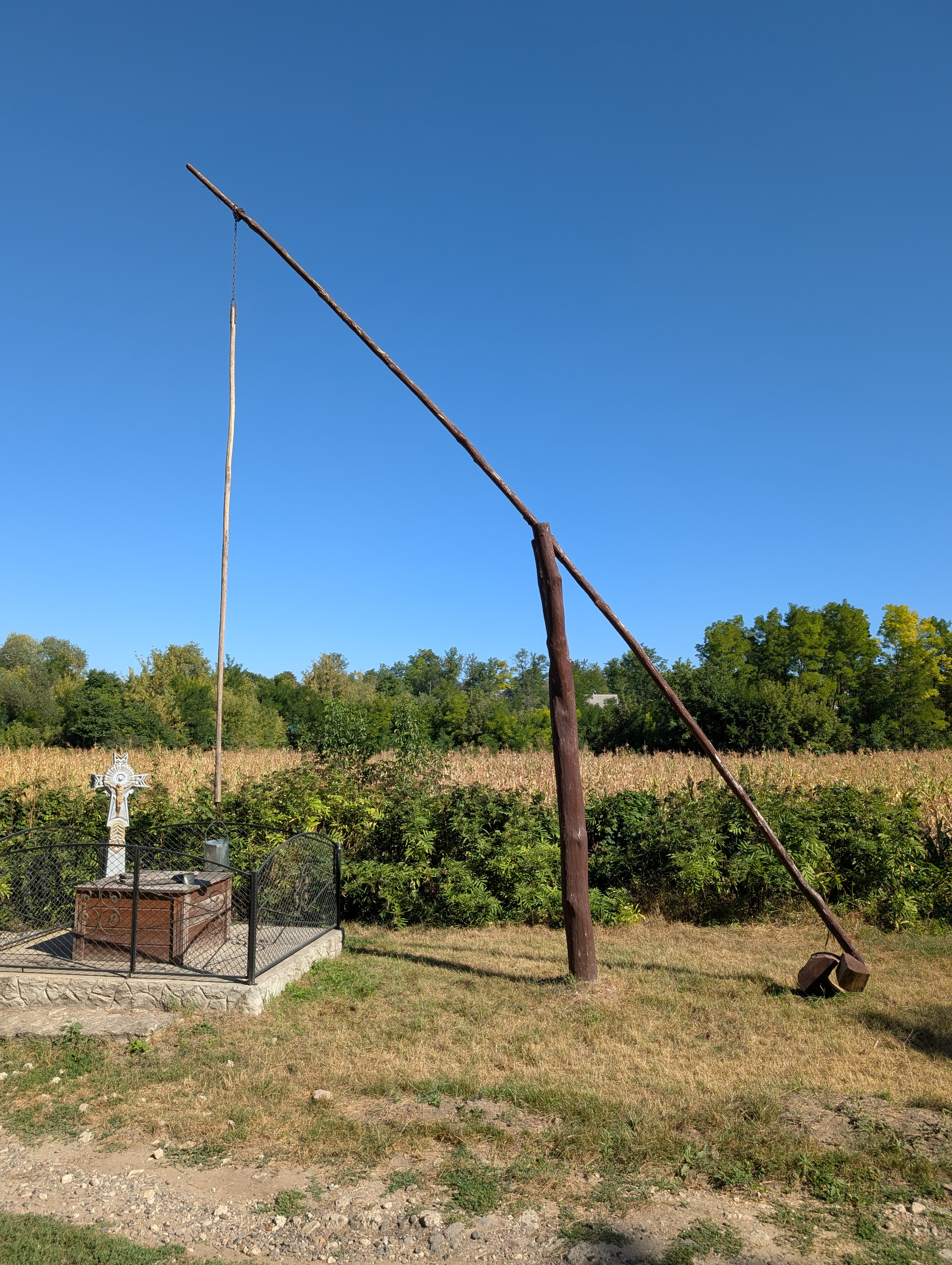
A well in Sănătăuca

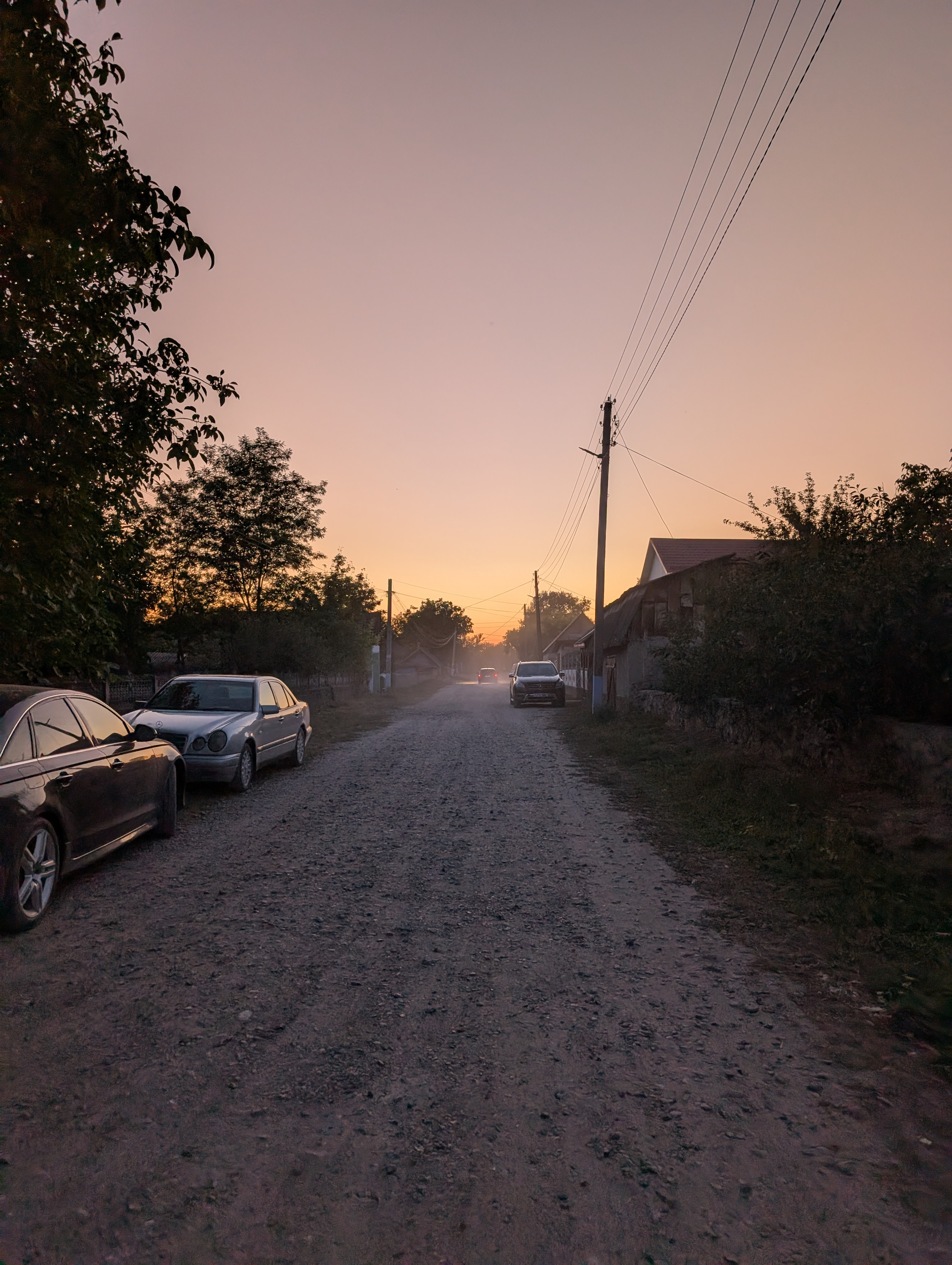
A road in Sănătăuca

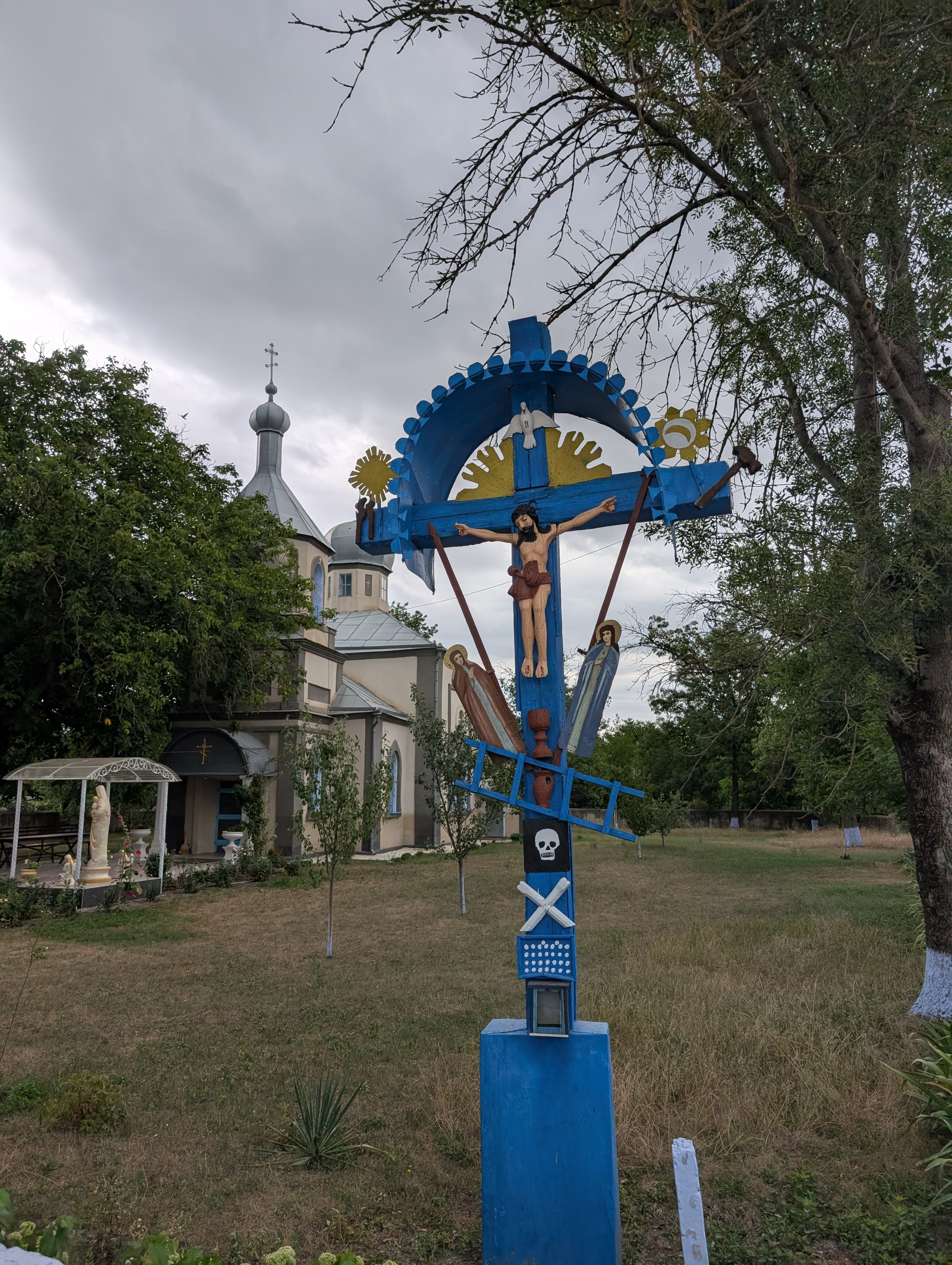
Sănătăuca cemetery
