= Denis Cristofovici =

Moldovan goalkeeper

Personal information
- Full name: Denis Cristofovici
- Date of birth: 26 November 1986 (age 39)
- Place of birth: Moldova
- Height: 1.82 m (5 ft 11 1/2 in)
- Position: Goalkeeper

Team information
- Current team: FC Olimpia Bălți
- Number: 15

Senior career*
Years	Team	Apps	(Gls)
2006–2010	FC Olimpia Bălți	10	(0)
2010–2012	FC Nistru Otaci	19	(0)
2012–	FC Olimpia Bălți	38	(0)
- * Club domestic league appearances and goals

Denis Cristofovici is a Moldovan goalkeeper who currently is playing for FC Olimpia Bălți.
