= Vadim Gulceac =

Moldovan footballer

Personal information
- Full name: Vadim Gulceac
- Date of birth: 6 August 1998 (age 28)
- Place of birth: Bălți, Moldova
- Position: Forward

Team information
- Current team: Bălți
- Number: 18

Youth career
- –2014: Zaria Bălț

Senior career*
Years	Team	Apps	(Gls)
2014–2019	Zaria Bălți	65	(8)
2019–2021	Petrocub Hîncești	71	(19)
2022	Unirea Slobozia	13	(2)
2022–	Bălți	9	(2)

International career^{‡}
2014–2015	Moldova U17	3	(0)
2016	Moldova U19	2	(0)
2017–2020	Moldova U21	7	(1)
- * Club domestic league appearances and goals as of 08:44, 31 October 2022 (UTC) ‡ National team caps and goals as of 7 April 2021

Vadim Gulceac (born 6 August 1998) is a Moldovan footballer who plays as a forward for CSF Bălți. In his career also played for teams such as Zaria Bălți or Petrocub Hîncești.
