= Dan Pîslă =

Moldovan footballer

Personal information
- Full name: Daniel Pîslă
- Date of birth: 14 June 1986 (age 40)
- Place of birth: Chișinău, Moldavian SSR, Soviet Union
- Height: 1.78 m (5 ft 10 in)
- Position: Midfielder

Team information
- Current team: Speranța Drochia
- Number: 21

Senior career*
Years	Team	Apps	(Gls)
2004–2005	Unisport-Auto Chișinău	6	(1)
2005	Dynamo Kyiv	0	(0)
2006	Vaslui	1	(0)
2006–2007	Iskra-Stal Rîbnița	25	(2)
2007–2010	Standard Sumgayit	37	(7)
2010–2011	FK Mughan	13	(1)
2011–2012	Academia Chișinău	9	(1)
2012	Turan Tovuz	12	(0)
2012–2013	Costuleni	41	(8)
2014	Tiraspol	8	(0)
2014	Veris Chișinău	9	(0)
2015	Zimbru Chișinău	10	(0)
2015–2016	Dinamo-Auto Tiraspol	17	(3)
2016–2017	Academia Chișinău	11	(0)
2017–2018	Speranța Nisporeni	29	(2)
2018	Petrocub Hîncești	7	(0)
2018–2020	Zimbru Chișinău	34	(5)
2020	Speranța Nisporeni	16	(3)
2021–2023	Milsami Orhei	57	(10)
2023	Florești	6	(0)
2024–	Speranța Drochia	7	(1)

International career
2005	Moldova U19	2	(0)
2007–2008	Moldova U21	6	(0)
2011	Moldova	1	(0)
- * Club domestic league appearances and goals as of 8 May 2024

Dan Pîslă (born 14 June 1986) is a Moldovan footballer who plays as a midfielder for Speranța Drochia.

== Honours ==
FC Tiraspol

- Divizia Națională Runner-up: 2013–14
