= Andrei Novicov =

Moldavian footballer

Personal information
- Date of birth: 24 April 1986 (age 40)
- Place of birth: Tiraspol, Moldova
- Height: 1.90 m (6 ft 3 in)
- Position: Centre-back

Team information
- Current team: Sfântul Gheorghe
- Number: 4

Senior career*
Years	Team	Apps	(Gls)
2003–2004	Sheriff Tiraspol	0	(0)
2004–2009	Tiraspol	111	(2)
2010–2013	Iskra-Stal Rîbnița	87	(13)
2013–2015	Tiraspol	50	(6)
2015–2016	Sheriff Tiraspol	16	(2)
2016–2018	Zaria Bălți	28	(6)
2018–2019	Milsami Orhei	7	(0)
2019–2021	Sfântul Gheorghe	50	(1)
2021–	Dinamo-Auto	25	(3)
- * Club domestic league appearances and goals as of 13:51, 1 June 2021 (UTC)

Andrei Novicov (born 24 April 1986) is a Moldovan footballer who plays as a defender for Sfântul Gheorghe Suruceni.
