= CSF Sparta Chișinău =

Sparta Chișinău
- Full name: Clubul Sportiv de Fotbal Sparta Chișinău
- Founded: 2016
- Dissolved: 2019
- Ground: Stadionul CS Real Succes; Chișinău, Moldova
- Capacity: 1,000
- Chairman: Ion Botnarenco
- 2019: Divizia A, 15th of 15 (withdrew)
Home colours	Away colours

CSF Sparta Chișinău was a Moldovan football club based in Chișinău, Moldova. They most recently played in the Moldovan "A" Division, the second tier of Moldovan football. In 2017 CSF Sparta Chisinau won Division B South, with the right to promote to Moldovan "A" Division. Also in 2017, CSF Sparta Chisinau started their own football school. The junior groups are playing in the National Division along with clubs with history and tradition in Moldovan football.

== Achievements ==
- Divizia B

Winners (1): 2017

- Divizia B

Runners-up (2): 2016-2017

- Winter Cup "Radautanu"

Runners-up (2):Moldovan Winter Cup 2017
