= FC Sireți =

Sireți
- Full name: Fotbal Club Sireți
- Founded: 5 March 2007
- Dissolved: 2021
- Ground: Stadionul Hârtop Sireți; Sireți, Moldova
- Capacity: 1,000
- 2020–21: Divizia A, 14th of 14 (relegated)
Home colours	Away colours

FC Sireți was a Moldovan football club based in Sireți, Moldova.

In 2017, Sireți won Division B Center, with the right to promote to Moldovan "A" Division.

== Achievements ==
- Divizia B

Winners (1): 2017
