= 2026–27 Moldovan Cup =

2026–27 Cupa Moldovei
Tournament details
- Country: Moldova
- Dates: 5 August 2026 – 29 May 2027
- Teams: 34

Tournament statistics
- Matches played: 23
- Goals scored: 137 (5.96 per match)

The 2026–27 Moldovan Cup (Romanian: Cupa Moldovei) is the 36th season of the annual Moldovan football cup competition. The competition started on 5 August 2026 with the first preliminary round and will end with the final on 29 May 2027. The winners will qualify for the second qualifying round of the 2027–28 UEFA Conference League.However, if the 2026–27 UEFA Conference League title holder also qualifies for the Champions League through their own domestic league, Moldovan cup winner spot will be upgraded to the first qualifying round of the 2027–28 UEFA Europa League.

== Format and schedule ==
Home advantage for the third preliminary round and the round of 16 is granted to the team from the higher league. The home team in the first legs of the quarter-finals, semi-finals and the final will be the team ranked higher in the current league season.

| Round | Draw date | Match dates | Fixtures | Clubs |
|---|---|---|---|---|
| First preliminary round | 17 June 2026 | 5 August 2026 | 5 | 34 → 29 |
| Second preliminary round | 17 June 2026 | 19 August 2026 | 5 | 29 → 24 |
| Third preliminary round | 2 July 2026 | 1–2 September 2026 | 8 | 24 → 16 |
| Round of 16 | 9 September 2026 | 27–28 October 2026 | 8 | 16 → 8 |
| Quarter-finals | 9 September 2026 | 18–19 March 2027 (1st leg); 13–14 April 2027 (2nd leg) | 8 | 8 → 4 |
| Semi-finals | 9 September 2026 | 28 April 2027 (1st leg); 12 May 2027 (2nd leg) | 4 | 4 → 2 |
| Final | 9 September 2026 | 29 May 2027 | 1 | 2 → 1 |

== Participating clubs ==
The following teams entered the competition:

| Liga the 8 teams of the 2026–27 season | Liga 1 the 10 teams of the 2026–27 season | Liga 2 the 14 teams of the 2026–27 season |
| Sheriff Tiraspol ^{title holder}; Zimbru Chișinău ^{runner-up}; Petrocub Hîncești; Milsami Orhei; Bălți; Dacia Buiucani; Politehnica UTM; Real Sireți | Spartanii Sportul; Iskra Rîbnița; Stăuceni; FCM Ungheni; Fălești; Oguz Comrat; Univer Comrat; Victoria Ialoveni; Vulturii Cutezători; Național Ialoveni; ~~Florești~~^{2} | Olimp Comrat; EFA Visoca; Speranța Drochia; Atletic Strășeni; Congaz^{3}; Steaua Nordului^{4}; Chișinău; Țarigrad; Edineț; Constructorul Leova; Locomotiva Ocnița; CMF Cahul; Atletico Bălți; Maiak Chirsova; ~~Real Succes~~^{1} |

Notes

1. Real Succes participated in the draw but withdrew before the tournament began.
2. Florești participated in the draw but withdrew before the tournament began.
3. The club is known as Saksan but recognized as Congaz by FMF
4. The club is known as Dinamo-Socol but recognized as Steaua Nordului by FMF

== First preliminary round ==
10 clubs from the Liga 2 entered this round and the other 5 clubs (selected via a draw) received a bye.

| 5 August 2026 | Țarigrad (3) | 2–0 | Locomotiva Ocnița (3) | Țarigrad |
| 17:30 EEST | Bajereanu 28' (pen.); Pascaru 88' | Report | | Stadium: Țarigrad Stadium; Attendance: 180; Referee: Roman Romanov |

| 5 August 2026 | Speranța Drochia (3) | 4–0 | Steaua Nordului (3) | Drochia |
| 17:30 EEST | Șestovschi 20'; Gherman 75', 86'; Mișcov 83' | Report | | Stadium: Drochia Stadium; Attendance: 150; Referee: Vitalie Gobjila |

| 5 August 2026 | Olimp Comrat (3) | 6–1 | Constructorul Leova (3) | Comrat |
| 17:30 EEST | Holodov 7'; Iavorschi 19', 90+2'; Savin 36'; Șumchin 71'; Procopișen 81' | Report | Pașa 29' | Stadium: Victor Mumjiev; Attendance: 75; Referee: Alexandr Codreanu |

| 5 August 2026 | Maiak Chirsova (3) | 2–6 | Congaz (3) | Chirsova |
| 17:30 EEST | Boicev 23'; Gaidarlî 53' | Report | Arnaut 11', 41'; Diordiev 33', 90+2'; Gherciu 77'; Calaraș 85' | Stadium: Chirsova Stadium; Attendance: 250; Referee: Stepan Ceavdari |

| 5 August 2026 | Edineț (3) | 4–3 | Atletic Strășeni (3) | Edineț |
| 17:30 EEST | Ursu 25'; Lupușor 37'; Creciun 56'; Grosu 73' | Report | Scobici 7'; Damaschin 21'; Baciu 75' | Stadium: Edineț Stadium; Attendance: 200; Referee: Ivan Luca |

== Second preliminary round ==
10 clubs from the Liga 2 entered this round.

| Edineț (3) | w/o | ~~Real Succes (3)~~ |

| 19 August 2026 | Țarigrad (3) | w/o | CMF Cahul (3) | Țarigrad |
| 17:00 EEST | | | | Stadium: Țarigrad Stadium; Referee: Ivan Luca |

| 19 August 2026 | Speranța Drochia (3) | 0–2 | Chișinău (3) | Drochia |
| 17:00 EEST | | Report | Bahu 7'; Kukarnikov 34' | Stadium: Drochia Stadium; Attendance: 200; Referee: Vadim Tîrsîna |

| 19 August 2026 | Olimp Comrat (3) | 5–3 | Atletico Bălți (3) | Comrat |
| 17:00 EEST | Hariton 9', 18'; Polisciuc 15'; Șleahtițchi 45', 80' | Report | Palii 22'; Babiuc 27', 45+2' | Stadium: Victor Mumjiev; Attendance: 100; Referee: Anatoli Glavațchi |

| 19 August 2026 | Congaz (3) | 6–3 | EFA Visoca (3) | Ceadîr-Lunga |
| 17:00 EEST | Terzi 1'; Gherciu 8', 81'; Arnaut 34'; Calaraș 71' (pen.); Arjintar 73' | Report | Ceavdari 41' (pen.); Ursache 45'; Sandu 55' | Stadium: Ceadîr-Lunga Stadium; Attendance: 150; Referee: Ruslan Țițilovski |

== Third preliminary round ==
5 clubs from the Liga 2 and 11 clubs from the Liga 1 entered this round.

| ~~Florești (2)~~ | w/o | Edineț (3) |

| 1 September 2026 | Oguz Comrat (2) | 2–1 | Vulturii Cutezători (2) | Comrat |
| 16:30 EEST | Ceavdari 41'; Gușpit 62' (pen.) | Report | Secureanu 25' | Stadium: Victor Mumjiev; Attendance: 100; Referee: Iurie Dogaru |

| 1 September 2026 | Spartanii Sportul (2) | 0–3 | Univer Comrat (2) | Chișinău |
| 16:30 EEST | | Report | Botnarenco 8' (pen.); Cavlac 51'; S. Gheorghiev 78' | Stadium: Real Succes; Attendance: 50; Referee: Ion Arhirii |

| 1 September 2026 | Victoria Ialoveni (2) | 5–3 | Fălești (2) | Ialoveni |
| 16:30 EEST | Pahomea 3', 58'; Brînză 22'; Budeanu 87'; Veverița 90' | Report | Tonofrei 7'; Daniliuc 29' (pen.), 45' | Stadium: Ialoveni Stadium; Attendance: 100; Referee: Andrei Ghetmanciuc |

| 2 September 2026 | Iskra Rîbnița (2) | 4–1 | Țarigrad (3) | Chișinău |
| 16:30 EEST | Pumnea 3' (o.g.); Muntean 28' (pen.); Osipov 39' (pen.); Harb 61' | Report | Burlac 31' | Stadium: Real Succes; Attendance: 50; Referee: Alexandru Rusu |

| 2 September 2026 | Stăuceni (2) | 1–1 (a.e.t.) (3–4 p) | Chișinău (3) | Stăuceni |
| 16:30 EEST | Ursu 28' (o.g.) | Report | Tuluc 2' | Stadium: Olimp Stadium; Attendance: 100; Referee: Petru Ciorba |
| | Penalties |
| | Jaman (penalty scored); Beșeti (penalty scored); Pîslă (penalty scored); Drăgan (penalty missed); Stoianov (penalty missed) | | (penalty scored) Roșca; (penalty scored) Cravcescu; (penalty missed) Pavlov; (penalty scored) Laur; (penalty scored) I. Mamaliga |

| 2 September 2026 | FCM Ungheni (2) | 9–0 | Olimp Comrat (3) | Ungheni |
| 16:30 EEST | Zvezdenco 15'; Stratan 20' (pen.), 41', 65'; Placinta 21'; Porojniuc 44'; Enache 58'; Maneacov 62', 89' | Report | | Stadium: Ungheni Stadium; Attendance: 300; Referee: Vladimir Mortean |

| 2 September 2026 | Național Ialoveni (2) | 1–2 | Congaz (3) | Ialoveni |
| 16:30 EEST | Rusu 83' | Report | Orbu 19', 24' (pen.) | Stadium: Ialoveni Stadium; Attendance: 250; Referee: Anatoli Glavațchi |

== Final stage ==
=== Bracket ===
Round of 16
Politehnica UTM | 5
Chișinău | 1
Bălți | 1
Iskra Rîbnița | 2
Sheriff Tiraspol | 11
Congaz | 0
Milsami Orhei | 7
FCM Ungheni | 0
Zimbru Chișinău | 6
Oguz Comrat | 0
Petrocub Hîncești | 8
Edineț | 2
Dacia Buiucani | 6
Univer Comrat | 0
Real Sireți | 8
Victoria Ialoveni | 0

Quarter-finals
Politehnica UTM
Iskra Rîbnița
Sheriff Tiraspol
Milsami Orhei
Zimbru Chișinău
Petrocub Hîncești
Dacia Buiucani
Real Sireți

Semi-finals

Final

== Round of 16 ==
3 clubs from the Liga 2, 5 clubs from the Liga 1 and 8 clubs from the Liga entered this round.

| 27 October 2026 | Politehnica UTM (1) | 5–1 | Chișinău (3) | Chișinău |
| 13:00 EET | Usatenco 16'; Katz 54'; Burlaciuc 72', 86'; Gandi 78' | Report | Condruc 7' | Stadium: UTM Stadium; Attendance: 84; Referee: Dumitru Muntean |

| 27 October 2026 | Dacia Buiucani (1) | 6–0 | Univer Comrat (2) | Nisporeni |
| 13:00 EET | Lupașco 10', 28', 60'; Ciobanu 59'; Vărzaru 65'; Novicov 71' | Report | | Stadium: Nisporeni Stadium; Attendance: 80; Referee: Andrei Diordiev |

| 27 October 2026 | Milsami Orhei (1) | 7–0 | FCM Ungheni (2) | Orhei |
| 16:00 EET | Sejdiu 3'; Luchiță 17', 65'; Gînsari 51'; Izountouemoi 75'; Bulmaga 86'; Igor Souza 89' | Report | | Stadium: Orhei Stadium; Attendance: 321; Referee: Oleg Stoianov |

| 27 October 2026 | Petrocub Hîncești (1) | 8–2 | Edineț (3) | Hîncești |
| 16:00 EET | Lupan 14', 73'; Nazari 30'; Sava 58'; Iosipoi 63'; Popescu 77'; Cojocaru 83'; Musteață 89' | Report | Lupușor 13'; Bîzga 87' | Stadium: Hîncești Stadium; Attendance: 187; Referee: Andrei Cojocaru |

| 28 October 2026 | Bălți (1) | 1–2 | Iskra Rîbnița (2) | Bălți |
| 13:00 EET | Roga 55' | Report | Osipov 23'; Golban 65' | Stadium: Bălți Stadium; Attendance: 120; Referee: Pavel Mura |

| 28 October 2026 | Real Sireți (1) | 8–0 | Victoria Ialoveni (2) | Lozova |
| 13:00 EET | Molla 2' (pen.), 82'; Dodon 12'; Borovschi 15', 46'; Covali 34'; Arabadji 59'; Dosca 90' | Report | | Stadium: Nicolae Simatoc; Attendance: 135; Referee: Andrei Ceban |

| 28 October 2026 | Sheriff Tiraspol (1) | 11–0 | Congaz (3) | Tiraspol |
| 16:00 EET | Kalabatama 4', 84'; Fratea 9', 36'; Loukou 11'; Sapata 38', 54', 56'; Klas 43'; Ciss 59'; Corotcov 88' | Report | | Stadium: Sheriff small Arena; Attendance: 402; Referee: Roman Jitari |

| 28 October 2026 | Zimbru Chișinău (1) | 6–0 | Oguz Comrat (2) | Chișinău |
| 16:00 EET | Ceijas 5'; Bonnah 27'; Caio 39'; Italo 66'; Rosario 85'; Amoroso 90+1' | Report | | Stadium: Zimbru Stadium; Attendance: 290; Referee: Andrei Breguța |

== Quarter-finals ==
1 club from the Liga 1 and 7 clubs from the Liga entered this round.

| 18 or 19 March 2027 1st leg | Politehnica UTM (1) | v | Iskra Rîbnița (2) | Chișinău |
| EET | | | | Stadium: UTM Stadium |

| 13 or 14 April 2027 2nd leg | Iskra Rîbnița (2) | v | Politehnica UTM (1) | Chișinău |
| EEST | | | | Stadium: Real Succes |

| 18 or 19 March 2027 1st leg | Sheriff Tiraspol (1) | v | Milsami Orhei (1) | Tiraspol |
| EET | | | | Stadium: Sheriff Arena |

| 13 or 14 April 2027 2nd leg | Milsami Orhei (1) | v | Sheriff Tiraspol (1) | Orhei |
| EEST | | | | Stadium: Orhei Stadium |

| 18 or 19 March 2027 1st leg | Zimbru Chișinău (1) | v | Petrocub Hîncești (1) | Chișinău |
| EET | | | | Stadium: Zimbru Stadium |

| 13 or 14 April 2027 2nd leg | Petrocub Hîncești (1) | v | Zimbru Chișinău (1) | Hîncești |
| EEST | | | | Stadium: Hîncești Stadium |

| 18 or 19 March 2027 1st leg | Dacia Buiucani (1) | v | Real Sireți (1) | Nisporeni |
| EET | | | | Stadium: Nisporeni Stadium |

| 13 or 14 April 2027 2nd leg | Real Sireți (1) | v | Dacia Buiucani (1) | Lozova |
| EEST | | | | Stadium: Nicolae Simatoc |
