= 2026–27 FC Sheriff Tiraspol season =

Sheriff Tiraspol
2026–27 season
- Chairman: Viktor Gushan
- Manager: Victor Mihailov (Acting) (until 9 September); Miodrag Džudović (from 9 September)
- Stadium: Sheriff Stadium
- Moldovan Liga: 1st
- Moldovan Cup: Quarter-final
- UEFA Europa League: Second qualifying round vs Maccabi Tel Aviv
- UEFA Conference League: Third qualifying round vs St. Gallen
- Top goalscorer: League: Jayder Asprilla (12); All: Jayder Asprilla (12)
- Highest home attendance: 2,741 vs Real Sireți (28 June 2026)
- Lowest home attendance: 402 vs Congaz (28 October 2026)
- Average home league attendance: 1,853 (17 October 2026)
Home colours	Away colours

The 2026–27 season is FC Sheriff Tiraspol's 30th season, and their 29th in the Moldovan Super Liga, the top-flight of Moldovan football.

== Season events ==
On 8 June, Sheriff announced the signing of Ion Ciobanu from Nürnberg II, and the signing of Vlad Lupașco from Dacia Buiucani

On 9 June, Sheriff announced the signing of Vladimir Fratea from Zimbru Chișinău.

On 16 June, Sheriff announced the signing of Miguel Mota from Paços Ferreira.

On 17 June, Sheriff announced the signing of Juanca Pineda from Beroe Stara.

On 18 June, Sheriff announced the signing of Victor Ciumașu from Dacia Buiucani.

On 22 June, Danila Forov signed a new contract with Sheriff.

On 23 June, Sheriff announced the signing of Arli Pergjoni from Bylis.

On 25 June, Sheriff announced the signing of Samba Koné from Académico de Viseu.

On 2 July, Sheriff announced the signing of Jair Modelo from CAI de La Chorrera.

On 18 July, Sheriff announced the signing of Mamoutou Ouedraogo from Rahimo.Shortly after completing the move, Ouédraogo stated that Sheriff Tiraspol's competitive league environment and the opportunity to continue his development were the main reasons behind his decision to join the Moldovan club.

On 8 August, Sheriff announced the signing of Kabamba Kalabatama from Milsami Orhei.

On 20 August, Sheriff announced the signing of Ștefan Bîtca from Zimbru Chișinău.

On 9 September, Sheriff announced the appointment of Miodrag Džudović as their new head coach.

On 14 September, Sheriff announced the return of Moussa Kyabou to the club, how'd most recently played for Gençlerbirliği.

== Squad ==
As of match played 7 November 2026

No.	Name	Nationality	Position	Date of birth (age)	Signed from	Signed in	Contract ends	Apps.	Goals
Goalkeepers
1	Emil Tîmbur	(Moldova)	GK	21 July 1997 (age 29)	Milsami Orhei	2026		29	0
12	Renat Josan	(Moldova)	GK	13 May 2007 (age 19)	Academy	2025		0	0
21	Ivan Dyulgerov	(Bulgaria)	GK	15 July 1999 (age 27)	CSKA Sofia	2025		18	0
25	Serghei Obiscalov	(Moldova)	GK	19 July 2006 (age 20)	Academy	2024		0	0
28	Nicolae Cebotari	(Moldova)	GK	21 May 1997 (age 29)	Zimbru Chișinău	2026		11	0
Defenders
2	Mamoutou Ouedraogo	(Burkina Faso)	DF	30 November 2006 (age 19)	Rahimo	2026		16	0
4	Natus Jamel Swen	(Liberia)	DF	18 November 2004 (age 21)	Mġarr United	2025		23	1
15	Baye Assane Ciss	(Senegal)	DF	10 October 2003 (age 23)	Teungueth	2025		41	1
22	Miguel Mota	(Portugal)	DF	26 August 2003 (age 23)	Paços Ferreira	2026		12	0
24	Danila Forov	(Moldova)	DF	7 January 2004 (age 22)	HNK Rijeka	2023		69	10
29	Soumaïla Magossouba	(Mali)	DF	28 June 2004 (age 22)	Stade Malien	2025		58	3
30	Alexandr Egupov	(Moldova)	DF	18 September 2007 (age 19)	Academy	2026		4	0
35	Bourama Fomba	(Mali)	DF	10 July 1999 (age 27)	Omonia Aradippou	2026		37	4
37	Jair Modelo	(Panama)	DF	17 July 2004 (age 22)	CAI de La Chorrera	2026		16	0
Midfielders
7	Ștefan Bîtca	(Moldova)	MF	27 September 2005 (age 21)	Zimbru Chișinău	2026		2	0
10	Vladimir Fratea	(Moldova)	MF	27 July 2003 (age 23)	Zimbru Chișinău	2026		22	7
16	Daniel Danu	(Moldova)	MF	26 August 2002 (age 24)	CSM Olimpia Satu Mare	2026		9	0
18	Moussa Kyabou	(Mali)	MF	18 April 1998 (age 28)	Unattached	2026		101	0
26	Dhoraso Klas	(Suriname)	MF	30 January 2001 (age 25)	Iberia 1999	2026		39	5
32	Emmanuel Afetse	(Ghana)	MF	9 March 2007 (age 19)	Progen	2026		5	0
33	Mihail Corotcov	(Moldova)	MF	24 July 2008 (age 18)	Academy	2025		16	1
55	Victor Ciumașu	(Moldova)	MF	24 June 2005 (age 21)	Dacia Buiucani	2026		7	0
76	Arli Pergjoni	(Albania)	MF	14 September 2002 (age 24)	Bylis	2026		23	1
77	Juanca Pineda	(Dominican Republic)	MF	12 January 2000 (age 26)	on loan from Beroe Stara	2026		16	3
80	Ion Ciobanu	(Moldova)	MF	13 February 2006 (age 20)	Nürnberg II	2026		0	0
99	Samba Koné	(Mali)	MF	22 March 2002 (age 24)	Académico de Viseu	2026		21	4
Forwards
8	Dan-Angelo Botan	(Moldova)	FW	19 February 2005 (age 21)	Academy	2023		11	0
9	Kabamba Kalabatama	(Norway)	FW	27 January 2002 (age 24)	Milsami Orhei	2026		11	3
11	Sapata	(Brazil)	FW	26 March 2003 (age 23)	RWDM Brussels	2026		31	6
19	Jayder Asprilla	(Colombia)	FW	20 March 2003 (age 23)	Atlético Nacional	2026		34	22
27	Vyacheslav Kozma	(Moldova)	FW	3 February 2005 (age 21)	Academy	2024		27	4
42	Konan Loukou	(Ivory Coast)	FW	15 June 2005 (age 21)	Issia Wazy	2023		65	10
70	Egor Ivanov	(Moldova)	FW	27 January 2007 (age 19)	Academy	2026		2	0
Out on loan
	Artiom Dijinari	(Moldova)	DF	26 October 2005 (age 21)	Academy	2022		4	0
	Luis Phelipe	(Brazil)	FW	12 February 2001 (age 25)	Unattached	2025		18	2
Left during the season
6	Raí	(Brazil)	DF	28 March 2000 (age 26)	Dinamo Minsk	2025		67	3
9	Vlad Lupașco	(Moldova)	FW	11 February 2005 (age 21)	on loan from Dacia Buiucani	2026		0	0
10	Zé Flores	(Brazil)	FW	20 May 1999 (age 27)	Bălți	2026		19	3
17	Vsevolod Nihaev	(Moldova)	MF	4 May 1999 (age 27)	Dacia Buiucani	2026		13	1

== Transfers ==
=== In ===
Date	Position	Nationality	Name	From	Fee	Ref.
8 June 2026	MF	(Moldova)	Ion Ciobanu	Nürnberg II	Undisclosed	
9 June 2026	MF	(Moldova)	Vladimir Fratea	Zimbru Chișinău	Undisclosed	
16 June 2026	DF	(Portugal)	Miguel Mota	Paços Ferreira	Undisclosed	
18 June 2026	MF	(Moldova)	Victor Ciumașu	Dacia Buiucani	Undisclosed	
23 June 2026	MF	(Albania)	Arli Pergjoni	Bylis	Undisclosed	
25 June 2026	MF	(Mali)	Samba Koné	Académico de Viseu	Undisclosed	
2 July 2026	DF	(Panama)	Jair Modelo	CAI de La Chorrera	Undisclosed	
18 July 2026	DF	(Burkina Faso)	Mamoutou Ouedraogo	Rahimo	Undisclosed	
8 August 2026	FW	(Norway)	Kabamba Kalabatama	Milsami Orhei	Undisclosed	
20 August 2026	MF	(Moldova)	Ștefan Bîtca	Zimbru Chișinău	Undisclosed	
14 September 2026	MF	(Mali)	Moussa Kyabou	Unattached	Free	

=== Loans in ===
Date from	Position	Nationality	Name	From	Date to	Ref.
8 June 2026	FW	(Moldova)	Vlad Lupașco	Dacia Buiucani		
17 June 2026	MF	(Dominican Republic)	Juanca Pineda	Beroe Stara		

=== Out ===
Date	Position	Nationality	Name	To	Fee	Ref.
25 July 2026	FW	(Brazil)	Zé Flores	Bnei Yehuda Tel Aviv	Undisclosed	
7 September 2026	DF	(Brazil)	Raí	Sport Recife	Undisclosed	

=== Loans out ===
Date from	Position	Nationality	Name	To	Date to	Ref.
1 August 2026	FW	(Brazil)	Luis Phelipe	Lee Man	30 June 2026	

== Friendlies ==
6 June 2026	Sheriff Tiraspol	5–1	FCM Ungheni	Tiraspol
EEST (UTC+3)	Asprilla; Zé Flores; Nihaev	Report	Goal	Stadium: Sheriff Arena

13 June 2026	Sheriff Tiraspol	0–2	Politehnica UTM Chișinău	Tiraspol
EEST (UTC+3)		Report		Stadium: Sheriff Arena

13 June 2026	Sheriff Tiraspol	3–1	Milsami Orhei	Tiraspol
EEST (UTC+3)	Asprilla; Sapata	Report	Goal	Stadium: Sheriff Arena

20 June 2026	Sheriff Tiraspol	3–0	Dacia Buiucani	Tiraspol
EEST (UTC+3)	Asprilla; Sapata; Loukou	Report		Stadium: Sheriff Arena

	–
EEST (UTC+3)

== Competitions ==
=== Overall record ===
Competition	First match	Last match	Starting round	Final position	Record							
Competition	First match	Last match	Starting round	Final position	Pld	W	D	L	GF	GA	GD	Win %
Liga	28 June 2026		Matchday 1		18	11	6	1	43	14	+29	61.11
Moldovan Cup	28 October 2026		Round of 16		1	1	0	0	11	0	+11	100.00
UEFA Europa League	9 July 2026	30 July 2026	First qualifying round	Second qualifying round	4	1	1	2	1	6	−5	25.00
UEFA Conference League	6 August 2026	13 August 2026	Third qualifying round	Third qualifying round	2	0	0	2	2	8	−6	0.00
Total					25	13	7	5	57	28	+29	52.00

Last updated: 7 November 2026
Source: Competitions

=== Super Liga ===
==== Phase I ====
===== League table =====
Pos	Team	Pld	W	D	L	GF	GA	GD	Pts	Qualification or relegation
1	Sheriff Tiraspol (Q)	18	11	6	1	43	14	+29	39	Qualification to Phase II
2	Zimbru Chișinău (Q)	18	10	5	3	38	15	+23	35	Qualification to Phase II
3	Petrocub Hîncești (Q)	18	9	6	3	34	16	+18	33	Qualification to Phase II
4	Dacia Buiucani (Q)	18	8	3	7	24	23	+1	27	Qualification to Phase II
5	Milsami Orhei (Q)	18	6	7	5	25	24	+1	25	Qualification to Phase II

Updated to match(es) played on 8 November 2026. Source: FMF, UEFA, Soccerway
Rules for classification: 1) Points; 2) Head-to-head points; 3) Head-to-head goal difference; 4) Head-to-head goals scored; 5) Matches won; 6) Goal difference; 7) Goals scored; 8) Least red cards; 9) Least yellow cards.
(Q) Qualified for the phase indicated

===== Results summary =====
Overall								Home						Away					
Pld	W	D	L	GF	GA	GD	Pts	W	D	L	GF	GA	GD	W	D	L	GF	GA	GD
18	11	6	1	43	14	+29	39	6	3	0	24	5	+19	5	3	1	19	9	+10

Last updated: 7 November 2026.
Source: FMF

===== Results =====
28 June 2026 1	Sheriff Tiraspol	3–0	Real Sireți	Tiraspol
18:00 EEST (UTC+3)	Forov 32'; Pergjoni (yellow card) 57'; Asprilla 73'; Loukou 83'	Report	Blajchin (yellow card) 18'; Bilinschii (yellow card) 45+1'; V.Rebeja (yellow card) 73'; Covali (yellow card) 74'	Stadium: Sheriff Arena; Attendance: 2,741; Referee: Roman Jitari

4 July 2026 2	Politehnica UTM Chișinău	0–0	Sheriff Tiraspol	Chișinău
18:00 EEST (UTC+3)	Doumbe (yellow card) 80'; Telic (yellow card) 85'	Report	Koné (yellow card) 60'	Stadium: UTM Chisinau Youth Sports Complex; Attendance: 315; Referee: Viktor Bugenko

12 July 2026 3	Sheriff Tiraspol	4–2	Zimbru Chișinău	Tiraspol
20:00 EEST (UTC+3)	Asprilla 14', 78' (yellow card) 87'; Raí (yellow card) 27'; Sapata 32'; Mota (yellow card) 58'; Koné 66'	Report	Amoroso 35'; Zolotov 90+2'	Stadium: Sheriff Arena; Attendance: 2,611; Referee: Igor Boșca

19 July 2026 4	Petrocub Hîncești	2–3	Sheriff Tiraspol	Hîncești
20:00 EEST (UTC+3)	Popescu 71' (yellow card) 77'; Rotaru 73'; Jardan (yellow card) 80'	Report	Asprilla 44', 63' (yellow card) 68'; Magossouba 52'; Sapata (yellow card) 82'	Stadium: Municipal Stadium; Attendance: 618; Referee: Denis Ivlev

26 July 2026 5	Sheriff Tiraspol	0–0	Milsami Orhei	Tiraspol
20:00 EEST (UTC+3)	Sapata (yellow card) 35'	Report	Takyi (yellow card) 77'	Stadium: Sheriff Arena; Attendance: 1,851; Referee: Andrei Breguța

2 August 2026 6	Bălți	1–5	Sheriff Tiraspol	Bălți
20:00 EEST (UTC+3)	Roga 45'; Rogac (yellow card) 88'	Report	Loukou 14'; Sapata 32'; Swen 38'; Forov 54'; Fratea 90+2' (pen.)	Stadium: Stadionul Municipal; Attendance: 1,412; Referee: Ivan Tudos

9 August 2026 7	Sheriff Tiraspol	1–0	Dacia Buiucani	Tiraspol
20:00 EEST (UTC+3)	Pergjoni 41'; Tîmbur (yellow card) 90+2'	Report	Josan (yellow card) 16' (yellow-red card) 54'; Baciu (yellow card) 75'; Muntean (yellow card) 82'; Lupașco (yellow card) 86'	Stadium: Sheriff Arena; Attendance: 1,538; Referee: Roman Jitari

16 August 2026 8	Real Sireți	1–1	Sheriff Tiraspol	Nisporeni
20:00 EEST (UTC+3)	Dosca 83'; Roșca (yellow card) 85'	Report	Fomba (yellow card) 36'; Asprilla 42' (penalty missed) 78'; Corotcov (yellow card) 53'; Pergjoni (yellow card) 82'	Stadium: Nisporeni Central Stadium; Attendance: 417; Referee: Andrei Breguța

23 August 2026 9	Sheriff Tiraspol	4–0	Politehnica UTM Chișinău	Tiraspol
20:00 EEST (UTC+3)	Magossouba (yellow card) 28'; Cojusea 34' (o.g.); Asprilla 61' (pen.); Fomba (red card) 64'; Koné 84', 90+1'	Report	Cojusea (yellow card) 25'; Arhirii (yellow card) 53' (yellow-red card) 76'	Stadium: Sheriff Arena; Attendance: 1,671; Referee: Viktor Bugenko

29 August 2026 10	Zimbru Chișinău	2–1	Sheriff Tiraspol	Chișinău
20:00 EEST (UTC+3)	Dantas 30' (penalty missed) 51'; Gonța (yellow card) 57'; Bețivu (yellow card) 86'; Abimael 87'	Report	Magossouba (yellow card) 20'; Ciss (yellow card) 48'; Forov (yellow card) 57'; Asprilla 73'	Stadium: Zimbru Stadium; Attendance: 2,123; Referee: Igor Boșca

5 September 2026 11	Sheriff Tiraspol	2–2	Petrocub Hîncești	Tiraspol
20:00 EEST (UTC+3)	Asprilla 68' (pen.); Koné 76'	Report	Pușcaș 59' (pen.); Jardan (yellow card) 67'; Nazari (yellow card) 87'; Cojocaru 90'	Stadium: Sheriff Arena; Attendance: 2,108; Referee: Igor Boșca

13 September 2026 12	Milsami Orhei	0–1	Sheriff Tiraspol	Orhei
19:00 EEST (UTC+3)	Odubia (yellow card) 14'	Report	Koné (yellow card) 7'; Fomba 59' (yellow card) 90'; Forov (yellow card) 76' (yellow-red card) 90+5'; Tîmbur (yellow card) 90+3'	Stadium: CSR Orhei; Attendance: 512; Referee: Viktor Bugenko

20 September 2026 13	Sheriff Tiraspol	7–0	Bălți	Tiraspol
19:00 EEST (UTC+3)	Asprilla 15'; Klas 36', 38'; Fratea 53', 76', 90+2'; Loukou 86'	Report		Stadium: Sheriff Arena; Attendance: 1,574; Referee: Mihail Borisov

10 October 2026 14	Dacia Buiucani	2–5	Sheriff Tiraspol	Nisporeni
17:00 EEST (UTC+3)	Baciu (yellow card) 16'; Lambarschi (yellow card) 28'; Calestru (yellow card) 30'; Lupașco 64'; Muntean (yellow card) 74'; Țurcan (yellow card) 76'	Report	Forov (yellow card) 13'; Pineda 21'; Koné (yellow card) 26'; Asprilla 45', 48' (yellow card) 51'; Kalabatama 77'; Tîmbur (yellow card) 88'; Magossouba (yellow card) 90+1'; Fratea 90+3'	Stadium: Central Stadium; Attendance: 350; Referee: Andrei Ceban

17 October 2026 15	Sheriff Tiraspol	2–0	Real Sireți	Tiraspol
15:00 EEST (UTC+3)	Klas 75'; Pineda 90'	Report	Casco (yellow card) 42'	Stadium: Sheriff Arena; Attendance: 732; Referee: Ivan Tudos

24 October 2026 16	Politehnica UTM Chișinău	0–2	Sheriff Tiraspol	Chișinău
15:00 EEST (UTC+3)	Căruntu (yellow card) 34'; Andreiciu (yellow card) 68'; Cojusea (yellow card) 71'; Mardari (yellow card) 71'; Socolov (yellow card) 90+4'	Report	Forov 16', 90+2'; Kalabatama (yellow card) 90+4'	Stadium: UTM Chisinau Youth Sports Complex; Attendance: 118; Referee: Denis Ivlev

31 October 2026 17	Sheriff Tiraspol	1–1	Zimbru Chișinău	Tiraspol
16:00 EEST (UTC+2)	Ouedraogo (yellow card) 20'; Asprilla 45+1'; Pineda (yellow card) 77'	Report	Dantas (yellow card) 3'; Amoroso (yellow card) 17'; Ceijas (yellow card) 29'; Macrițchii (yellow card) 50'; Bețivu 51'; Boico (yellow card) 71'	Stadium: Sheriff Arena; Attendance: 1,279; Referee: Andrei Breguța

7 November 2026 18	Petrocub Hîncești	1–1	Sheriff Tiraspol	Hîncești
16:00 EEST (UTC+2)	David (yellow card) 38'; Popescu 53'; Cucoș (yellow card) 57'; Bogaciuc (yellow card) 62'; Revenco (yellow card) 90+1'	Report	Fomba 64'; Asprilla (yellow card) 90+1'	Stadium: Municipal Stadium; Attendance: 535; Referee: Igor Boșca

21 November 2026 19	Sheriff Tiraspol	–	Milsami Orhei	Tiraspol
15:00 EEST (UTC+2)		Report		Stadium: Sheriff Arena

=== Moldovan Cup ===
28 October 2026 Round of 16	Sheriff Tiraspol	11–0	Congaz	Tiraspol
16:00 EET (UTC+2)	Kalabatama 3', 81'; Fratea 8', 36'; Loukou 10'; Sapata 38', 51', 53'; Klas 42'; Ciss 56'; Corotcov 85'	Report	Becu (yellow card) 31'	Stadium: Malaya Sportivnaya Arena; Attendance: 402; Referee: Roman Jitari

18–19 March 2027 Quarter-final 1st leg	Milsami Orhei	–	Sheriff Tiraspol
EET (UTC+2)

13–14 April 2027 Quarter-final 2nd leg	Sheriff Tiraspol	– (– agg.)	Milsami Orhei
EEST (UTC+3)

=== UEFA Europa League ===
==== Qualifying rounds ====
9 July 2026 First qualifying round 1st leg	Sheriff Tiraspol (Moldova)	0–0	(Slovenia) Aluminij	Tiraspol, Moldova
20:00 EEST (UTC+3)	Fomba (yellow card) 48'; Zé Flores (yellow card) 90+2'	Report	Vrbanec (yellow card) 46'	Stadium: Sheriff Arena; Attendance: 5,634; Referee: Arnes Talic (Austria)

16 July 2026 First qualifying round 2nd leg	Aluminij (Slovenia)	0–1 (0–1 agg.)	(Moldova) Sheriff Tiraspol	Maribor, Slovenia
21:00 EEST (UTC+3)	Vrbanec (yellow card) 23'; Tezak (yellow card) 34'; Boben (yellow card) 61'	Report	Loukou 5'; Asprilla (yellow card) 61'	Stadium: Ljudski vrt Attendance: 2,000; Referee: Anojen Kanagasingam (Switzerland)
Note: Aluminij will play their home matches at Ljudski Vrt in Maribor instead of their regular stadium, Aluminij Sports Park in Kidričevo, which does not fulfill UEFA requirements.

23 July 2026 Second qualifying round 1st leg	Sheriff Tiraspol (Moldova)	0–5	(Israel) Maccabi Tel Aviv	Tiraspol, Moldova
20:00 EEST (UTC+3)	Ciss (yellow card) 17'; Mota (yellow card) 60'; Magossouba (yellow card) 73'; Ouedraogo (yellow card) 76'; Forov (yellow card) 77'	Report	Abu Farchi 5', 74' (pen.); Do. Peretz 29'; Yehezkel (yellow card) 48'; Jehezkel 53'; Sissokho 78'	Stadium: Sheriff Arena; Attendance: 7,157; Referee: Kyriakos Athanasiou (Cyprus)

30 July 2026 Second qualifying round 2nd leg	Maccabi Tel Aviv (Israel)	1–0 (6–0 agg.)	(Moldova) Sheriff Tiraspol	Batumi, Georgia
20:00 EEST (UTC+3)	Koné 29' (o.g.)	Report	Nihaev (yellow card) 71'; Ciss (yellow card) 90+3'	Stadium: Adjarabet Arena; Attendance: 1,012; Referee: Mikkel Redder (Denmark)
Note: Due to the Gaza war, Israeli teams were required to play their home matches at neutral venues until further notice.

=== UEFA Conference League ===
==== Qualifying rounds ====
6 August 2026 Third qualifying round 1st leg	Sheriff Tiraspol (Moldova)	1–3	(Switzerland) St. Gallen	Tiraspol, Moldova
20:00 EEST (UTC+3)	Pineda 89'	Report	Hunziker 63'; Frokaj 70'; Witzig 90+2'	Stadium: Sheriff Arena; Attendance: 4,889; Referee: Adam Ladebäck (Sweden)

13 August 2026 Third qualifying round 2nd leg	St. Gallen (Switzerland)	5–1 (8–2 agg.)	(Moldova) Sheriff Tiraspol	St. Gallen, Switzerland
21:00 EEST (UTC+3)	Besio 1', 76'; Daschner (yellow card) 27'; Hunziker 34', 59'; Stevanović 87'	Report	Forov 9'; Ciss (yellow card) 36'; Raí (yellow card) 48'; Pergjoni (yellow card) 52'; Koné (yellow card) 81'	Stadium: Sitterstadion; Attendance: 12,296; Referee: Julian Weinberger (Austria)

== Squad statistics ==
As of match played 7 November 2026

=== Appearances and goals ===
No.	Pos	Nat	Player	Total		Liga		Moldovan Cup		Europa League	
No.	Pos	Nat	Player	Apps	Goals	Apps	Goals	Apps	Goals	Apps	Goals
1	GK	(Moldova) MDA	Emil Tîmbur	17	0	12	0	0	0	5	0
2	DF	(Burkina Faso) BFA	Mamoutou Ouedraogo	16	0	10+2	0	0	0	3+1	0
4	DF	(Liberia) LBR	Natus Jamel Swen	2	1	1	1	0	0	0+1	0
7	MF	(Moldova) MDA	Ștefan Bîtca	2	0	2	0	0	0	0	0
8	FW	(Moldova) MDA	Dan-Angelo Botan	4	0	2+2	0	0	0	0	0
9	FW	(Norway) NOR	Kabamba Kalabatama	11	3	2+8	1	1	2	0	0
10	MF	(Moldova) MDA	Vladimir Fratea	21	7	11+4	5	1	2	2+3	0
11	FW	(Brazil) BRA	Sapata	16	5	3+6	2	1	3	2+4	0
15	DF	(Senegal) SEN	Baye Assane Ciss	17	1	7+3	0	1	1	6	0
18	MF	(Mali) MLI	Moussa Kyabou	2	0	0+1	0	0+1	0	0	0
19	FW	(Colombia) COL	Jayder Asprilla	20	13	14+1	13	0	0	5	0
21	GK	(Bulgaria) BUL	Ivan Dyulgerov	2	0	1	0	0	0	1	0
22	DF	(Portugal) POR	Miguel Mota	11	0	4+2	0	1	0	3+1	0
24	DF	(Moldova) MDA	Danila Forov	24	5	13+4	4	0+1	0	6	1
26	MF	(Suriname) SUR	Dhoraso Klas	23	4	13+3	3	1	1	6	0
27	MF	(Moldova) MDA	Veaceslav Cozma	10	0	2+6	0	0+1	0	0+1	0
28	GK	(Moldova) MDA	Nicolae Cebotari	6	0	5	0	1	0	0	0
29	DF	(Mali) MLI	Soumaïla Magossouba	16	1	13	1	1	0	1+1	0
30	DF	(Moldova) MDA	Alexandr Egupov	4	0	3	0	0+1	0	0	0
32	MF	(Ghana) GHA	Emmanuel Afetse	2	0	0+1	0	1	0	0	0
33	MF	(Moldova) MDA	Mihail Corotcov	8	1	4+3	0	0+1	1	0	0
35	DF	(Mali) MLI	Bourama Fomba	22	2	16	2	0	0	5+1	0
37	DF	(Panama) PAN	Jair Modelo	16	0	12+1	0	1	0	0+2	0
42	FW	(Ivory Coast) CIV	Konan Loukou	18	5	2+9	3	1	1	4+2	1
55	MF	(Moldova) MDA	Victor Ciumașu	7	0	4+3	0	0	0	0	0
70	FW	(Moldova) MDA	Egor Ivanov	2	0	1+1	0	0	0	0	0
76	MF	(Albania) ALB	Arli Pergjoni	23	1	13+4	1	0	0	6	0
77	MF	(Dominican Republic) DOM	Juanca Pineda	16	3	13+1	2	0	0	1+1	1
99	MF	(Mali) MLI	Samba Koné	21	4	10+5	4	0	0	4+2	0
Players away on loan:
Players who left Sheriff Tiraspol during the season:
6	DF	(Brazil) BRA	Raí	9	0	3	0	0	0	6	0
10	FW	(Brazil) BRA	Zé Flores	4	0	1+1	0	0	0	0+2	0
17	MF	(Moldova) MDA	Vsevolod Nihaev	4	0	1	0	0	0	0+3	0

=== Goal scorers ===
Place	Position	Nation	Number	Name	Liga	Moldovan Cup	Europa League	Total
1	FW	(Colombia)	19	Jayder Asprilla	13	0	0	13
2	MF	(Moldova)	10	Vladimir Fratea	5	2	0	7
3	FW	(Moldova)	24	Danila Forov	4	0	1	5
3	FW	(Ivory Coast)	42	Konan Loukou	3	1	1	5
3	FW	(Brazil)	11	Sapata	2	3	0	5
6	MF	(Mali)	99	Samba Koné	4	0	0	4
6	MF	(Suriname)	26	Dhoraso Klas	3	1	0	4
8	MF	(Dominican Republic)	77	Juanca Pineda	2	0	1	3
8	FW	(Norway)	9	Kabamba Kalabatama	1	2	0	3
10	DF	(Mali)	35	Bourama Fomba	2	0	0	2
11	DF	(Mali)	29	Soumaïla Magossouba	1	0	0	1
11	DF	(Liberia)	4	Natus Jamel Swen	1	0	0	1
11	MF	(Albania)	76	Arli Pergjoni	1	0	0	1
11	DF	(Senegal)	15	Baye Assane Ciss	0	1	0	1
11	MF	(Moldova)	33	Mihail Corotcov	0	1	0	1
11				Own goal	1	0	0	1
				TOTALS	43	11	3	57

=== Clean sheets ===
Place	Position	Nation	Number	Name	Liga	Moldovan Cup	Europa League	Total
1	GK	(Moldova)	1	Emil Tîmbur	7	0	1	8
2	GK	(Moldova)	28	Nicolae Cebotari	2	1	0	3
3	GK	(Bulgaria)	21	Ivan Dyulgerov	0	0	1	1
				TOTALS	9	1	2	12

=== Disciplinary record ===
Number	Nation	Position	Name	Liga		Moldovan Cup		Europa League		Total	
Number	Nation	Position	Name	Yellow card	Red card	Yellow card	Red card	Yellow card	Red card	Yellow card	Red card
1	(Moldova)	GK	Emil Tîmbur	3	0	0	0	0	0	3	0
2	(Burkina Faso)	DF	Mamoutou Ouedraogo	1	0	0	0	1	0	2	0
9	(Norway)	FW	Kabamba Kalabatama	1	0	0	0	0	0	1	0
11	(Brazil)	FW	Sapata	2	0	0	0	0	0	2	0
15	(Senegal)	DF	Baye Assane Ciss	1	0	0	0	3	0	4	0
19	(Colombia)	FW	Jayder Asprilla	4	0	0	0	1	0	5	0
22	(Portugal)	DF	Miguel Mota	1	0	0	0	1	0	2	0
24	(Moldova)	DF	Danila Forov	4	1	0	0	1	0	5	1
29	(Mali)	DF	Soumaïla Magossouba	3	0	0	0	1	0	4	0
33	(Moldova)	MF	Mihail Corotcov	1	0	0	0	0	0	1	0
35	(Mali)	DF	Bourama Fomba	3	1	0	0	0	0	3	1
76	(Albania)	MF	Arli Pergjoni	2	0	0	0	1	0	3	0
77	(Dominican Republic)	MF	Juanca Pineda	1	0	0	0	0	0	1	0
99	(Mali)	MF	Samba Koné	3	0	0	0	1	0	4	0
Players away on loan:
Players who left Sheriff Tiraspol during the season:
6	(Brazil)	DF	Raí	1	0	0	0	1	0	2	0
10	(Brazil)	FW	Zé Flores	0	0	0	0	1	0	1	0
17	(Moldova)	MF	Vsevolod Nihaev	0	0	0	0	1	0	1	0
			TOTALS	30	2	0	0	14	0	44	2
