= Nicolae Simatoc =

Romanian footballer (1920–1979)

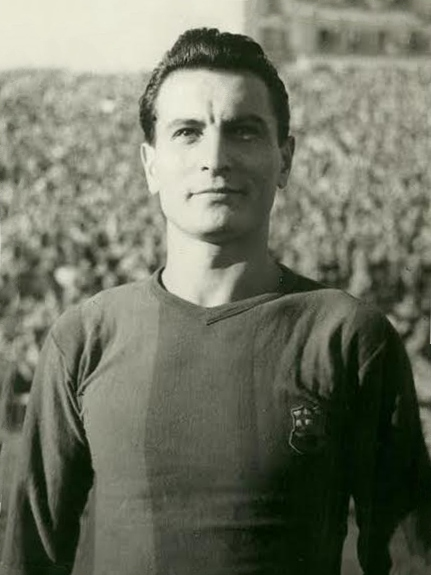
- Simatoc in 1950 with Barcelona

Personal information
- Birth name: Nicolae Șmatoc
- Date of birth: 1 May 1920
- Place of birth: Grimăncăuți, Kingdom of Romania
- Date of death: 11 December 1979 (aged 59)
- Place of death: Sydney, Australia
- Height: 1.92 m (6 ft 4 in)
- Position: Midfielder

Youth career
- 1934–1938: Ripensia Timișoara

Senior career*
Years	Team	Apps	(Gls)
1938–1941	Ripensia Timișoara	44	(3)
1941–1942	Carmen București (Note: The 1940–41 Divizia A was the last season before World War II and the 1946–47 Divizia A was the first one after, so the appearances and goals scored during this period for Carmen București are not official with the exception of the 1945–46 regional championship.)	0	(0)
1942–1944	Nagyváradi AC	32	(3)
1945	Vasas	9	(3)
1945–1947	Carmen București	12	(0)
1948–1949	Inter Milan	17	(3)
1949–1950	Brescia	30	(8)
1950	Hungaria FbC Roma		
1950–1952	Barcelona	34	(2)
1952–1953	Real Oviedo	5	(0)
Total		183	(22)

International career
1940–1946	Romania	8	(0)

Managerial career
- 1946: Carmen București (player/coach)
- 1959–1960: Lleida
- 1960–1961: Sabadell
- 1962–1963: AEL Limassol
- 1963–1968: Budapest Sydney
- 1969–1972: Polonia Western Eagles
- * Club domestic league appearances and goals

Nicolae Simatoc (also known as Nicolae Șmatoc, Miklós Szegedi or Nicholas Sims; 1 May 1920 – 11 December 1979) was a Romanian football player and manager.

== Club career ==
=== Romania and Hungary ===
Simatoc began playing junior-level football at age 14 in 1934 at Ripensia Timișoara. He made his Divizia A debut on 28 May 1939 under coach Sepp Pojar in a 1–0 home loss to Juventus București. In 1941, he went to Carmen București where he spent one and a half seasons. Subsequently, he moved to Hungary at Nagyváradi AC, making his Nemzeti Bajnokság I debut on 18 October 1942 under coach Ferenc Rónay in a 3–0 home victory against Ferencváros. Under the guidance of Rónay, he won the title in his first season, contributing with one goal in 19 matches. Afterwards, Simatoc spent one year at Vasas, making his last Nemzeti Bajnokság I appearance on 13 December 1944 in a 2–0 home victory against BKV Előre SC, totaling 41 matches with six goals in the competition. He returned to Romania at Carmen where on 7 December 1947 he played his last Divizia A match in a 6–2 home win against Ciocanul București, accumulating a total of 57 games with three goals in the Romanian top-league.

=== Italy ===
In 1948, Simatoc joined Inter Milan, making his Serie A debut on 25 January under coach Giuseppe Meazza in a 3–0 loss to Napoli. He scored his first goal in a 4–1 win over Fiorentina, scoring two more until the end of the season in a victory against AS Roma and a loss to Triestina. In the following season, he helped Inter to a runner-up position in the league, making his last appearance in the competition in a 0–0 draw against Lucchese.

Afterwards, he went to play for one season at Brescia in Serie B where he scored a personal record of eight goals to help earn a sixth-place finish. In 1950, Simatoc played alongside László Kubala for Hungaria FbC Roma, a team that was formed mainly from Hungarian players that left the Eastern Bloc and played exhibition games in Italy and Spain under coach Ferdinand Daučík.

=== Spain ===
His next spell was at Barcelona where on 10 September 1950 he made his La Liga debut under coach Daučík in a 8–2 win over Real Sociedad, managing to score once and provide three assists. He played regularly for the Catalans in his first season, wearing the number 10 shirt, appearing in a 7–2 win over Real Madrid in the El Clásico. He netted his second goal in another 7–2 victory against Málaga, also managing to win the Copa del Generalísimo. In his second season with Barça, Simatoc made six league appearances as the club won The Double. Simatoc spent the last season of his career at Real Oviedo where on 22 March 1953 he played his last La Liga game, a 4–0 away loss to Valencia, totaling 39 matches with two goals in the competition.

== International career ==
Simatoc played eight games for Romania, making his debut on 22 September 1940 at age 20 under coach Liviu Iuga in a friendly which ended with a 2–1 away victory against Yugoslavia. His last three games for the national team were in the 1946 Balkan Cup, consisting of a draw against Bulgaria, a victory over Yugoslavia and a loss to Albania.

== Managerial career ==
Simatoc had a short tenure as a player-coach in 1946 at Carmen București. After retiring as a player, he became a coach, managing Lleida between 1959 and 1960 in the Spanish third league, promoting Eladio to play for the team. Afterwards, he coached Sabadell from 1960 until 1961 in the second league. In 1961 he worked as a technical director for Espanyol, and then in 1962, Simatoc went to Cyprus to coach AEL Limassol for one year. In 1963, he moved to Australia, coaching Budapest Sydney for five years, and then Polonia Western Eagles for three years.

== Personal life ==
Simatoc was born to Romanian parents on 1 May 1920 in Grimăncăuți, then part of Romania, present-day Moldova. His birth name was Nicolae Șmatoc, while in Hungary he was known as Miklós Szegedi and in Australia as Nicholas Sims. Simatoc was married to a Hungarian woman named Etelka Stolárcsik, with whom he had two sons, Silvio and Santi. Silvio, born in 1950, had followed his father's footsteps and played for the junior squads of Barcelona and in the first league of Australia at Hakoah Sydney City.

Simatoc was multilingual, speaking ten languages: Romanian, Hungarian, Serbian, Russian, Italian, Spanish, English, French, Catalan and German. After retirement he became a professional poker player and owned a casino in Australia.

== Death ==
He died in Sydney on 11 December 1979 at age 59 after suffering a heart attack while playing a game of poker.

== Legacy ==
A stadium in Lozova, Moldova is named after him.

A book about him was written in 2013 by Octavian Țîcu and Boris Boguș titled Nicolae Simatoc (1920 – 1979). Legenda unui fotbalist basarabean de la Ripensia la FC Barcelona (Nicolae Simatoc (1920 – 1979). The legend of a Bessarabian footballer from Ripensia to FC Barcelona). A documentary about him called Nicolae Simatoc - variațiuni pe un nume (Nicolae Simatoc - variations on a name) was released in 2017.

== Honours ==
Nagyváradi

- Hungarian League: 1943–44

Barcelona

- La Liga: 1951–52
- Copa del Rey: 1951, 1952
