= 2026–27 Moldovan Liga 2 =

Liga 2
- Season: 2026–27
- Dates: 18 July 2026 – 15 May 2027

The 2026–27 Moldovan Liga 2 is the 36th season of Moldovan football's third-tier league. The season started on 18 July 2026 and will conclude on 15 May 2027.

== Teams ==
Location of teams in 2026–27 Liga 2

Club	Location	Ground	Turf
Atletico	Bălți	Locomotiv Stadium	Natural
Atletic	Strășeni	Strășeni Stadium (Note: Nicolae Simatoc Stadium in Lozova used as home ground in 2 matches.)	Artificial
CMF Cahul	Cahul	Atlant Stadium	Artificial
Chișinău	Chișinău	Petru Zadnipru	Artificial
Constructorul	Leova	Sărata-Galbenă (Sărata-Galbenă)	Artificial
Dinamo-Socol (Note: Recognized as Steaua Nordului by FMF)	Slobozia	Slobozia Stadium	Natural
Edineț	Edineț	Edineț Stadium	Natural
EFA Visoca	Visoca	Visoca Stadium	Natural
Locomotiva	Ocnița	Ocnița Stadium	Artificial
Maiak	Chirsova	Chirsova Stadium	Natural
Olimp	Comrat	Victor Mumjiev	Artificial
Saksan (Note: Recognized as Congaz by FMF)	Ceadîr-Lunga	Ceadîr-Lunga	Artificial
Sheriff-2	Tiraspol	Sheriff training field	Natural
Speranța	Drochia	Drochia Stadium	Natural
Țarigrad	Țarigrad	Țarigrad Stadium	Natural

=== Personnel and kits ===
Team	Head coach	Captain	Kit maker	Kit sponsors	
Team	Head coach	Captain	Kit maker	Main	Other(s)
Atletico	(Moldova) Iuri Cernîh	(Moldova) Artiom Novicov	Joma (a)	None	
Atletic	(Moldova) Vladimir Vusatîi	(Moldova) Adrian Donoagă	Macron	Primăria Strășeni	List: Back: Kozlovna
CMF Cahul	(Moldova) Sergiu Ponomarenco (Note: Sergiu Ponomarenco missed from the sideline in matches 3, 8, 10, 17, and 18.)	(Moldova) Ion Ciarîcu	Macron	Primăria municipiului Cahul	List: Back: Gebhardt
Chișinău	(Moldova) Octavian Onofrei	(Moldova) Igor Lohov	Joma (1) / Gera (2)	None	List: Sleeve: Primăria municipiului Chișinău (1)
Constructorul	(Moldova) Ruslan Diacenco	(Moldova) Ilie Mostovei	Macron	None	List: Back: Primăria Leova; Sleeve: Unitech; Shorts: Unitech
Dinamo-Socol (Note: Also known as Steaua Nordului)	(Moldova) Alexandr Camaldinov (Note: Iurii Hodîchin (matches 1–3), No coach (match 4))	(Moldova) Denis Socolov	Macron	None	
Edineț	(Moldova) Vadim Caminschi (Note: Vadim Caminschi does not hold UEFA B Licence and led the team as an assistant coach.)	(Moldova) Serghei Popovici	Joma	None	
EFA Visoca	(Moldova) Dmitri Grebenco (Note: Dmitri Grebenco (matches 1–10), Marin Spoială (match 11) (Note: Dmitri Grebenco was absent and the assistant coach led the team.), Dmitri Grebenco (matches 12–15), Marin Spoială (matches 16–17) (Note: Dmitri Grebenco was absent and the assistant coach led the team.))	(Moldova) Corneliu Rotaru	Fanatik (1) / Macron (2)	Familia Botnari (1), 3Decor (2)	List: Back: Apă minerală naturală Soroca (1); Sleeve: Observatorul de Nord (2)
Locomotiva	(Moldova) Grigore Ciobanu	(Moldova) Renat Murguleț	Jako (a)	None	
Maiak	(Moldova) Gheorghe Șompol	(Moldova) Stanislav Dobrioglo	Macron	None	
Olimp	(Moldova) Vitali Popov (Note: Nicolai Mandrîcenco (matches 1–8), No coach (matches 9–14))	(Moldova) Roman Șumchin	Puma	None	
Saksan (Note: Also known as Congaz)	(Moldova) Nicolai Sarioglo (Note: Nicolai Sarioglo missed from the sideline in match 15 as he was serving a suspension.)	(Moldova) Dmitri Calaraș	Zeus (1) / Joma (2)	None	
Sheriff-2	(Moldova) Andrei Radiola	(Moldova) Ivan Jeju	Adidas	None	
Speranța	(Moldova) Vitalie Cuzub	(Moldova) Vladimir Cheptenari	Macron	None	
Țarigrad	(Moldova) Nicolai Reaboi	(Moldova) Sergiu Boghean	Joma (1) / Givova (2)	Global Farming International	None

== League table ==
Pos	Team	Pld	W	D	L	GF	GA	GD	Pts	Promotion or qualification
1	Sheriff-2 Tiraspol	15	13	2	0	54	11	+43	41	Promotion to Liga 1
2	Edineț	17	13	2	2	51	22	+29	41	Qualification for promotion play-off
3	Chișinău	18	11	3	4	45	24	+21	36	
4	Congaz (Note: The club is known as Saksan) (Note: Moldovan Football Federation has rejected the request made on 9 July 2026 by Congaz to change the club’s name to Saksan and the request made on 17 July 2026 by Steaua Nordului to change its name to Dinamo-Socol, citing that the official names of the participating clubs were approved by a decision of the Executive Committee on 19 June 2026.)	17	10	4	3	53	24	+29	34	
5	Speranța Drochia	18	10	0	8	36	34	+2	30	
6	Locomotiva Ocnița	18	9	1	8	34	33	+1	28	
7	EFA Visoca	18	7	4	7	39	25	+14	25	
8	Atletic Strășeni	16	7	3	6	25	26	−1	24	
9	Țarigrad	17	7	1	9	35	38	−3	22	
10	Maiak Chirsova	17	7	0	10	26	48	−22	21	
11	Olimp Comrat	17	6	3	8	39	40	−1	21	
12	Steaua Nordului (Note: The club is known as Dinamo-Socol)	18	4	2	12	23	41	−18	14	
13	Constructorul Leova	18	3	2	13	20	62	−42	11	
14	CMF Cahul	18	2	3	13	17	49	−32	9	
15	Atletico Bălți	18	5	2	11	23	43	−20	5 (Note: Atletico Bălți had 12 points deducted for using players who played the same day for the junior team in home matches against Țarigrad, Speranța, Maiak and Steaua Nordului, which is not permitted by regulations.)	Qualification for relegation play-off

Updated to match(es) played on 21 November 2026. Source: FMF
Rules for classification: 1) Points; 2) Head-to-head points; 3) Head-to-head goal difference; 4) Head-to-head goals scored; 5) Matches won; 6) Goal difference; 7) Goals scored; 8) Less red cards; 9) Less yellow cards.

=== Results ===
Teams will play each other twice (once home, once away).

Home \ Away	ATB	ATS	CAH	CNG	CHI	CNS	EDI	EFA	LOC	MAI	OLI	SHE	SPE	STE	ȚAR
Atletico Bălți	—	2–1	2–0	10 Apr	13 Mar	8 May	2–1	1–1	3–0	0–3 (Note: Atletico received a 0–3 technical loss in a home game against Maiak due to violation of regulations. The original match ended in a 2–1 victory for Atletico.)	2–3	27 Mar	0–5	0–3 (Note: Atletico received a 0–3 technical loss in a home game against Steaua Nordului due to violation of regulations. The original match ended in a 2–1 victory for Atletico.)	0–3 (Note: Atletico received a 0–3 technical loss in a home game against Țarigrad due to violation of regulations. The original match ended in a 1–1 draw.)
Atletic Strășeni	2–1	—	1–0	1–0	3–1	3 Apr	3–4	1–1	15 May	17 Apr	2–1	3 Dec	20 Mar	1 May	2–3
CMF Cahul	20 Mar	10 Apr	—	1–6	3 Apr	1–4	2–2	0–3 (Note: CMF Cahul received a 0–3 technical loss in a home game against EFA Visoca for fielding an ineligible player. The original match ended in a 3–1 victory for CMF Cahul.)	28 Nov	2–0	24 Apr	2–3	1–3	0–0	8 May
Congaz	5–0	5–1	1 May	—	1–1	28 Nov	3 Apr	17 Apr	8–3	3–1	15 May	0–3	4–1	20 Mar	1–0
Chișinău	4–0	27 Mar	7–0	24 Apr	—	1–1	28 Nov	20 Mar	1–0	5–0	2–2	10 Apr	2–1	4–3	3–1
Constructorul Leova	3–2	0–0	2–1	0–3	1–4	—	1 May	15 May	1–3	2–4	1–6	0–1	27 Mar	17 Apr	13 Mar
Edineț	5–1	6 Dec	13 Mar	1–1	2–1	7–0	—	1–0	2–0	8 May	27 Mar	2–5	24 Apr	6–1	10 Apr
EFA Visoca	28 Nov	13 Mar	27 Mar	3–4	4–1	6–1	0–1	—	0–1	5–0	10 Apr	0–0	8 May	2–1	24 Apr
Locomotiva Ocnița	2–1	2–3	4–1	27 Mar	1–3	24 Apr	1–2	0–0	—	3–2	3–1	13 Mar	2–0	8 May	6–1
Maiak Chirsova	15 May	3–1	1–0	13 Mar	1–3	10 Apr	2–5	4–3	1 May	—	2–0	10 Mar	1–3	0–1	2–1
Olimp Comrat	3 Apr	8 May	3–3	2–2	17 Apr	3–0	3–5	3–5	20 Mar	28 Nov	—	1 May	2–1	4–2	5–2
Sheriff-2 Tiraspol	1–1	24 Apr	17 Apr	8 May	3–1	8–0	20 Mar	3 Apr	3–1	11–0	1–0	—	8–2	28 Nov	2–1
Speranța Drochia	1 May	0–2	2–0	2–1	15 May	4–0	0–4	3–1	17 Apr	3 Apr	2–1	1–2	—	3–2	3–1
Steaua Nordului	1–5	1–0	2–3	2–2	0–1	3–2	15 May	0–3	1–2	24 Apr	13 Mar	0–3	10 Apr	—	27 Mar
Țarigrad	17 Apr	2–2	4–0	2–7	1 May	5–2	0–1	3–2	3 Apr	20 Mar	5–0	15 May	28 Nov	1–0	—

Updated to match(es) played on 21 November 2026. Source: FMF (in Romanian)
Legend: Blue = home team win; Yellow = draw; Red = away team win.
