= Nyers =

Nyers (pronounced [ɲɛrʃ]) is a Hungarian surname, meaning "raw". Notable people with the surname include:

- Boglárka Dallos-Nyers (born 1997), Hungarian pop singer, known as Bogi
- Ferenc Nyers (born 1927), French football player
- István Nyers (1924 – 2005), Hungarian football player
- Rezső Nyers (1923 - 2018), Hungarian economist and politician
