= Caio Dantas =

Caio Dantas may refer to:

- Caio Dantas (footballer, born 1993), Brazilian footballer who plays as a forward for Guarani
- Caio Dantas (footballer, born 2003), Brazilian footballer who plays as a midfielder for Torpedo-BelAZ Zhodino
