= CS Nicolae Simatoc Stadium =

Football stadium in Lozova, Moldova

Coordinates: 47.134204°N 28.383839°E

Nicolae Simatoc Stadium
- Complexul Sportiv „Nicolae Simatoc”
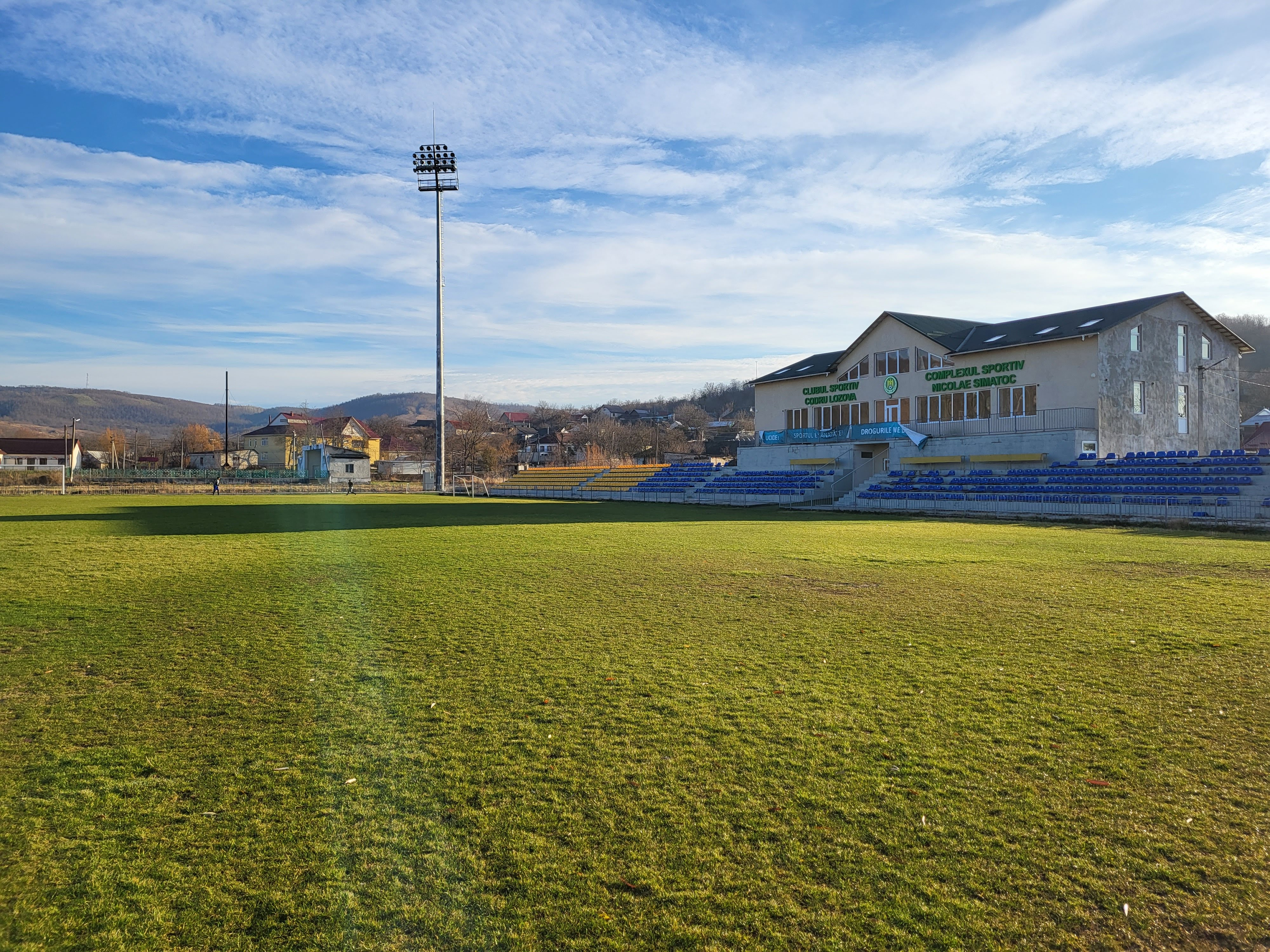
- The stadium in 2023
- Interactive map of Nicolae Simatoc Stadium
- Location: Lozova, Moldova
- Owner: Atletic Strășeni
- Capacity: 1,060
- Surface: Artificial turf
- Field size: 103 by 67 metres (112.6 yd × 73.3 yd)

Construction
- Opened: 2020

Tenant
- Atletic Strășeni

Nicolae Simatoc Stadium, also known as Stadionul comunei Lozova, is a football stadium in Lozova, Moldova. The stadium has been home of FC Codru Lozova until 2021, when the club merged with CS Atletic Strășeni. Since then it has been hosting home games of the latter. It has a capacity of 1060 seats.

The stadium is named after Nicolae Simatoc a Romanian football manager and player born in Grimăncăuți, currently Moldova.

== Gallery ==
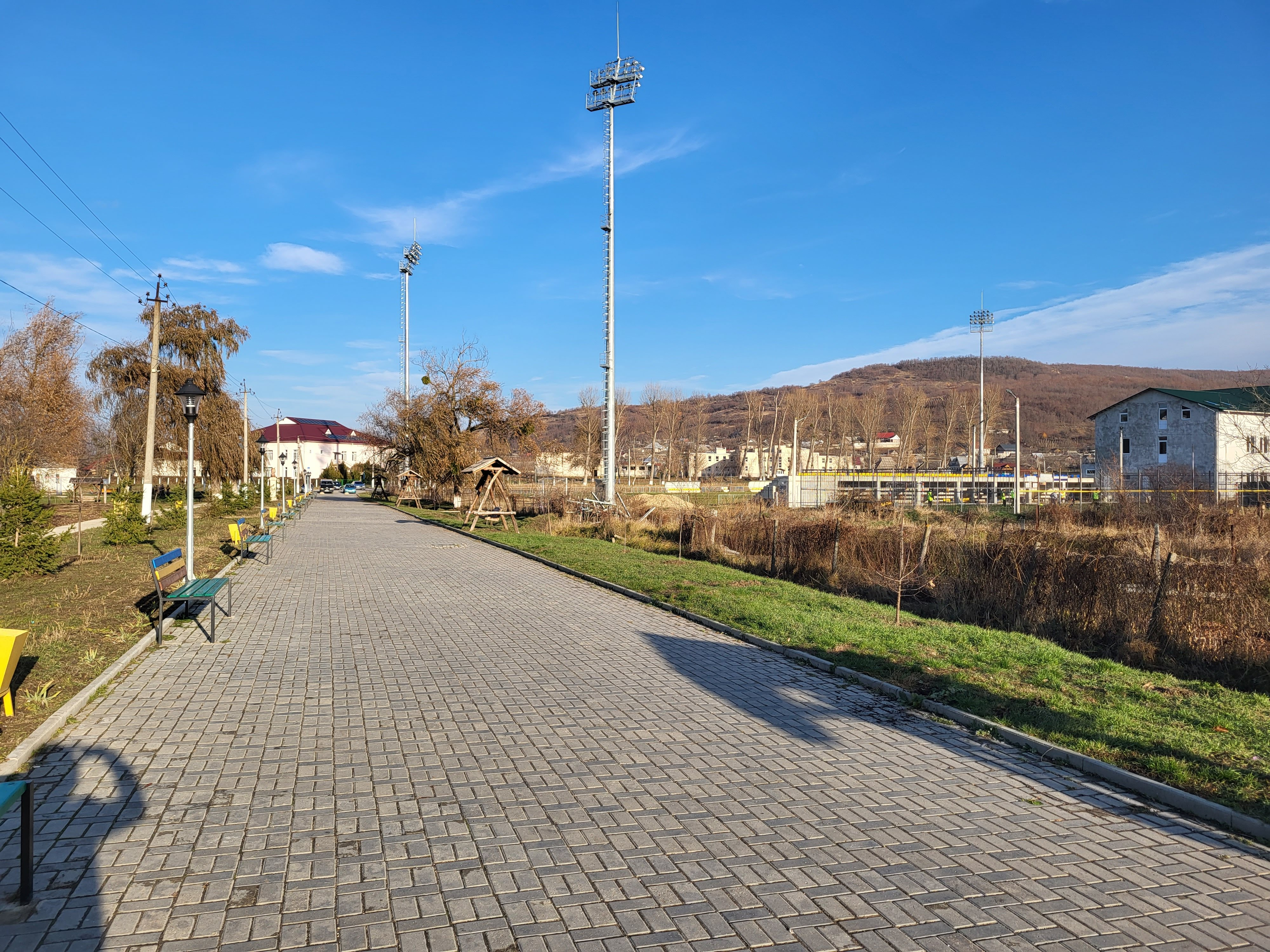
The walking alley

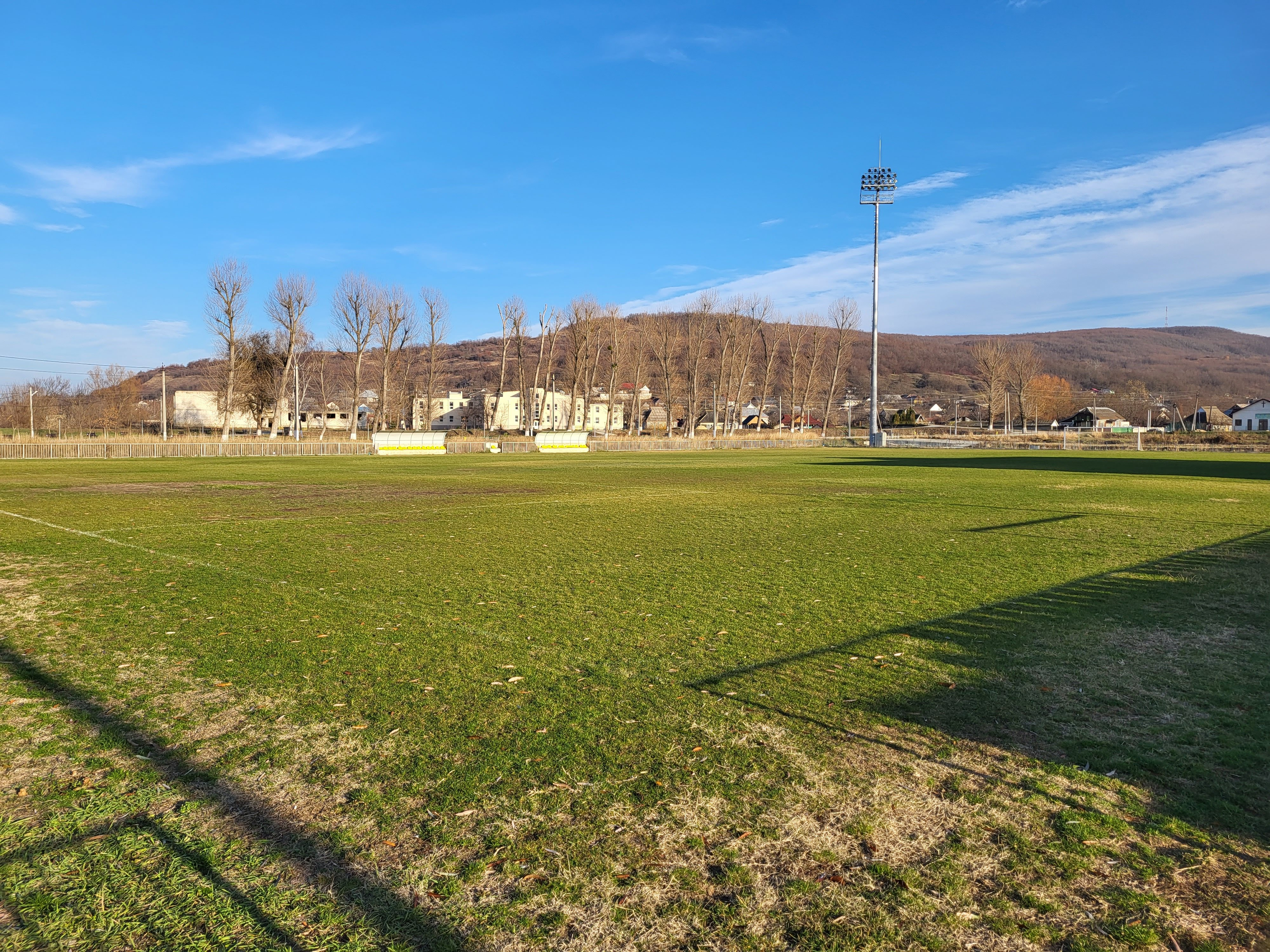
The pitch

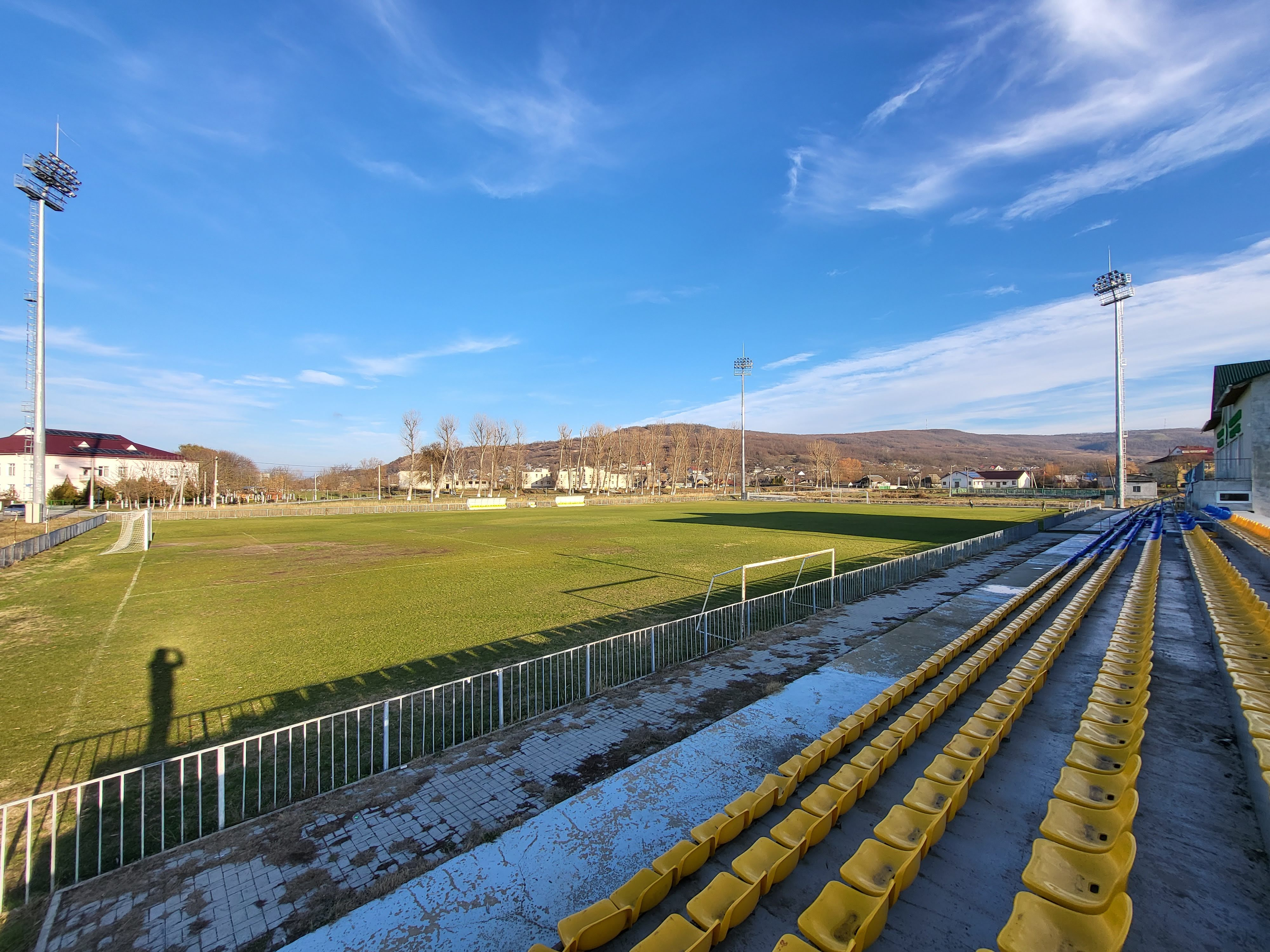
View from top

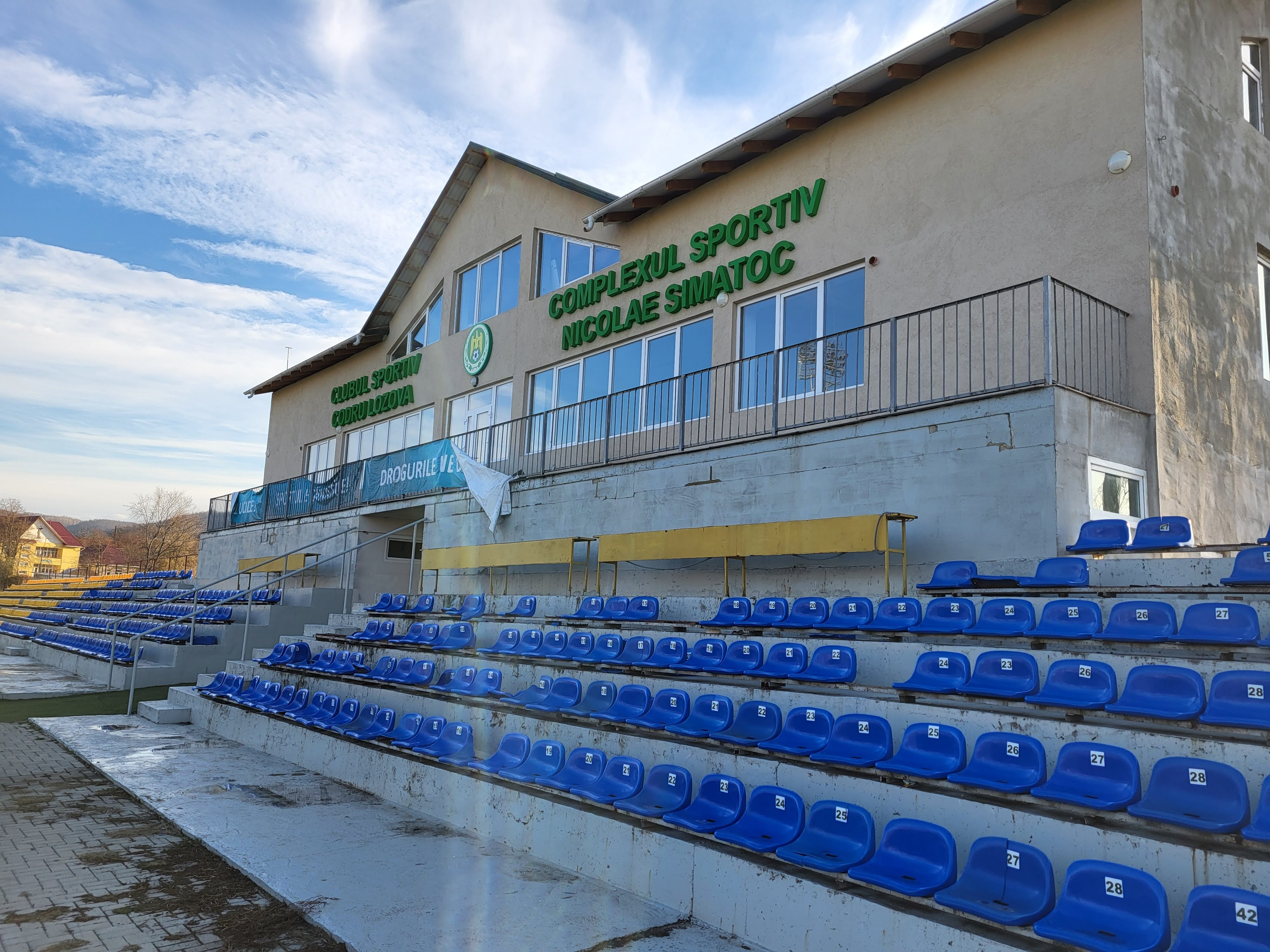
The main building

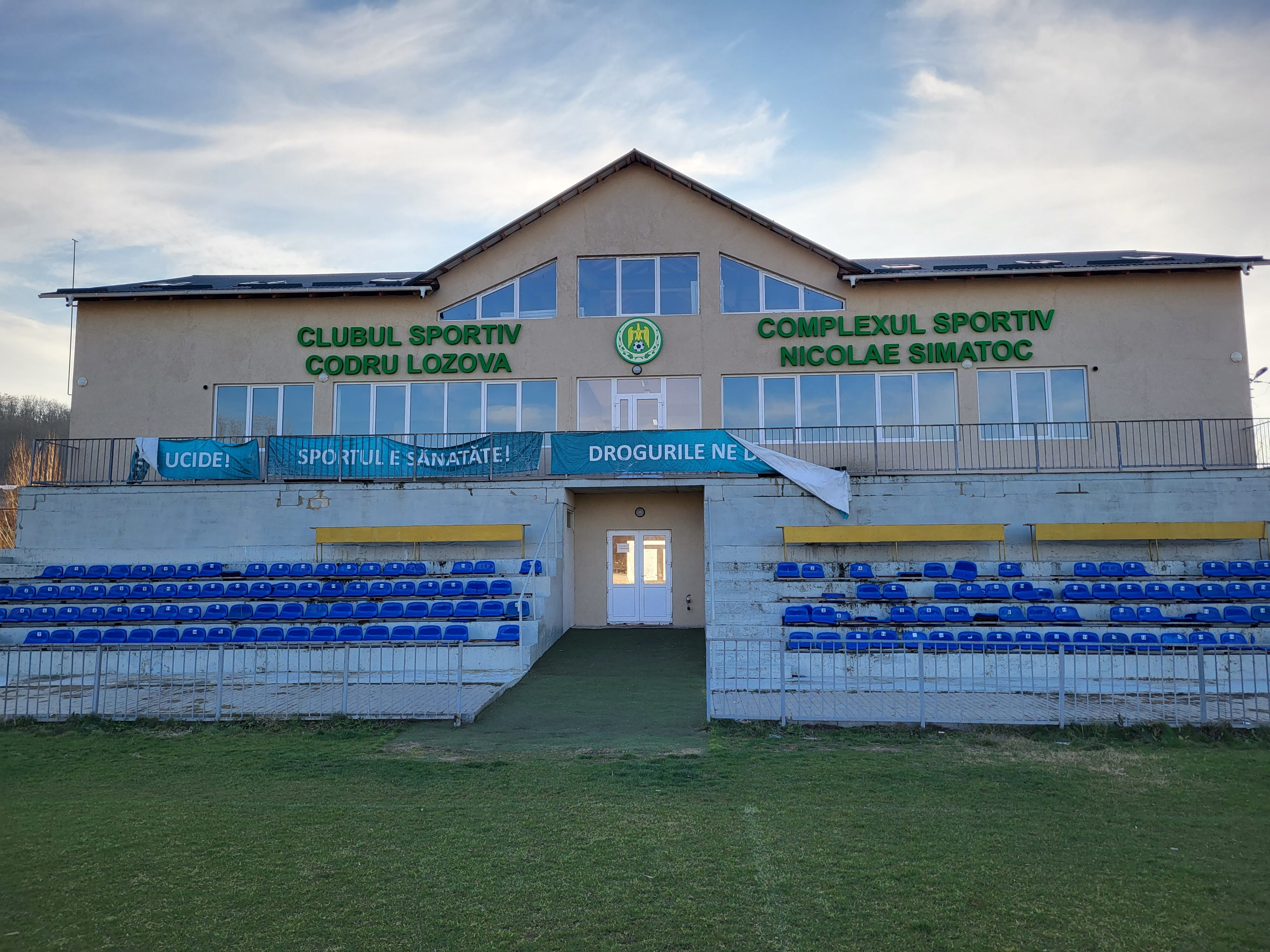
The main building

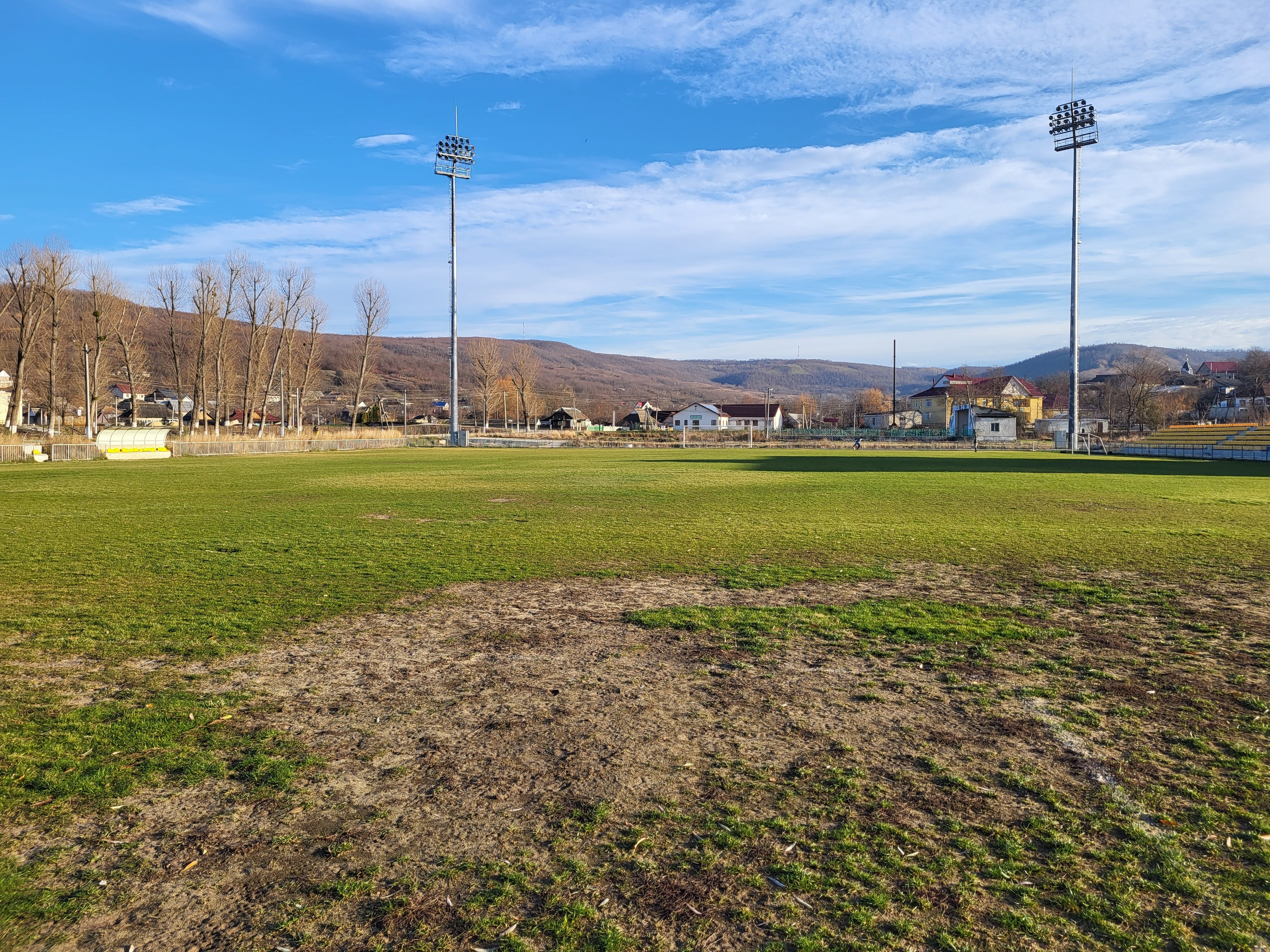
The pitch

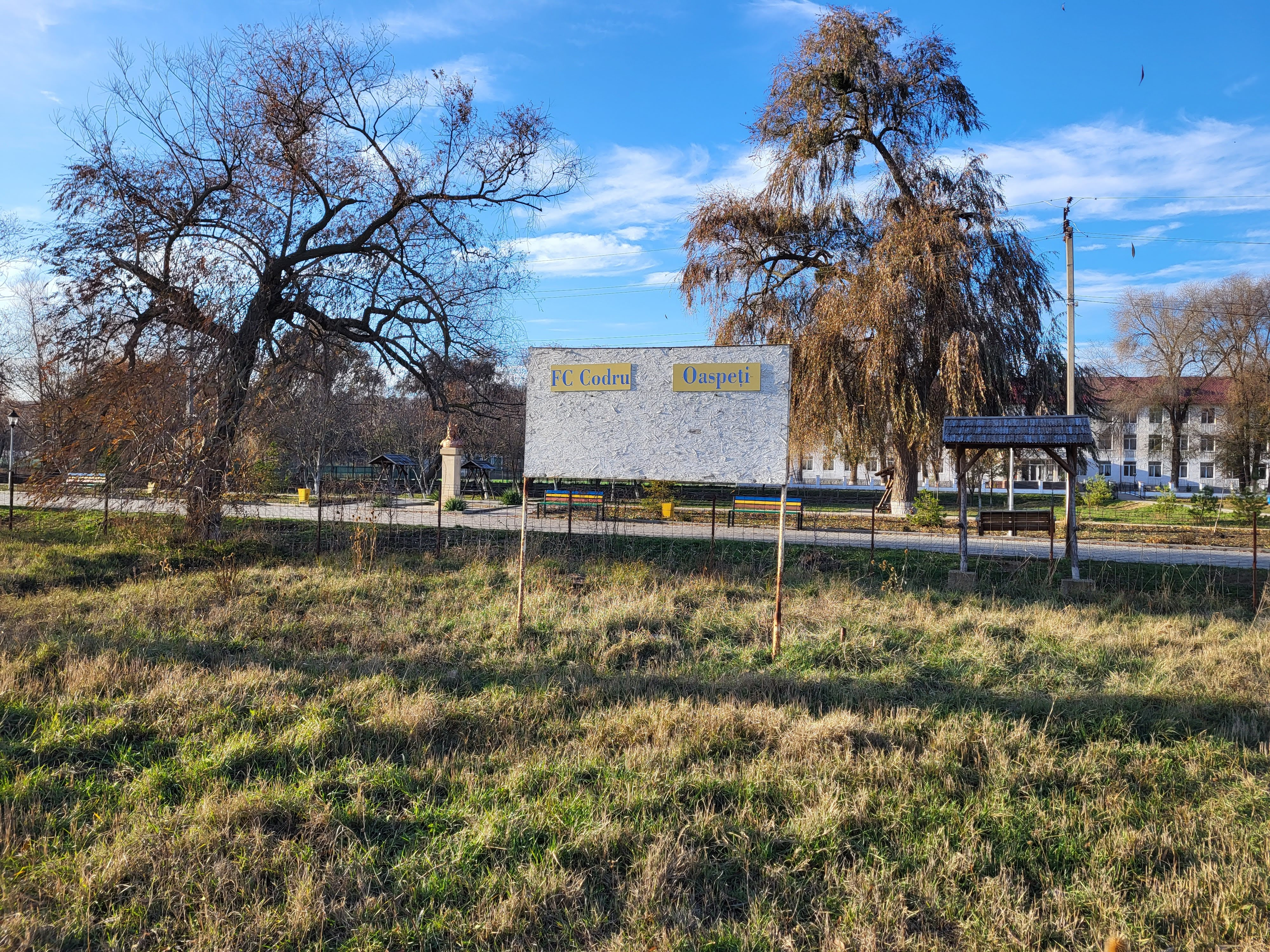
The scoreboard
