= Zlata Tkach =

Moldovan composer and music educator

- Born: 16 May 1928; Lozova, Kingdom of Romania
- Died: 1 January 2006 (aged 77); Chișinău, Moldova

Zlata Moiseyevna Tkach (née Zlata Beyrihman; Russian: Злата Моисеевна Ткач; Yiddish: זלאַטע טקאַטש; Romanian: Zlata Tcaci; 16 May 1928 – 1 January 2006) was a Moldovan composer and music educator. She was the first woman to become a professional composer in Moldova.

== Biography ==
Zlata Beyrihman was born in the Bessarabian village of Lozova to Moisey Bentsionovich Beyrihman and his wife Freida Mendelevna Koifman. When Zlata was still a young child the family moved to Chișinău, where she went to the Romanian primary school for girls and studied violin from her father.

After finishing elementary school, Zlata went to the grammar school 'Regina Maria' in Chișinău.

During World War II, Zlata was evacuated with her mother to Central Asia, but was separated from her in transit and ended up in the city of Namangan in Uzbekistan, where there was typhus and typhoid fever. Zlata stayed in a Drogobycha orphanage and went to secondary school. During this time, she composed her first song, "Sailors". In 1943 she was reunited with her family after the liberation of the city, and returned to Chișinău.

In 1949, Zlata married the Moldovan musicologist Efim Markovich Tkach (1926–2003), who was an author and editor of books in Russian and Moldovan. In 1953, their son Lyova (Lev) was born.

Zlata studied physics and mathematics at the University of Chișinău and then entered the Musicology Department of the Chișinău Conservatory, where she graduated in 1952. She studied composition with Leonid Simonovich Gurov (1910–1993), and violin with Iosif Lvovich Daylis (1893–1984). From 1952 to 1962 she taught at a music school in Chișinău. In 1957 she continued her studies in the Conservatory's composition class, and after graduating in 1962 became a teacher there and continued to work at the Conservatory until the end of her life. In 1986 she became an associate professor, and in 1993 a full professor of composition.

Tkach was honored as the first woman to become a professional composer in Moldova. She was the Honored Artist of the Moldavian SSR (1974), winner of State Prize of Moldova (1982), and Chevalier of the Order of Work Merit.

Zlata Tkach died in 2006 in Chișinău.

== Works ==
Tkach composed about 800 works, including sonatas, string quartets, suites, vocal music, choral and instrumental works, cantatas, opera, ballet, instrumental miniatures, children's songs, and music for drama, cinema and theater. Her successful children's opera "Goat with Three Kids" (Capra cu trei iezi; written 1966) was revised several times and finally reintroduced as "The Impostor Wolf" (Lupul impostor) in 1983. Compositions include:

- "Dance". Chișinău: Map moldovenyaske, 1963.
- "Moldavian dance". Chișinău: Map moldovenyaske, 1965.
- "Sonata for Viola and Piano". Moscow: Soviet Composer, 1981.
- Unchiul meu din Paris opéra (1987)
- Leagăn de mohor (35 piano miniatures). Chișinău, 1988.
- Dine guter nomen (name of his good, to Yiddish, with notes). A song cycle on poems by Chic Driesse. Chișinău: The League, 1996.
- Sholom Aleichem: the collection of vocal works. Chișinău: Pontos, 2001.
- Dos glekele (Bell, on poems by Jewish poets in Yiddish, with notes). Berlin, 2004.
- Flacăra iubirii (Flame of Love). Romances on poems by Agnes Rosca. Chișinău: Cartea Moldovei, 2006.
