= Hungaria FbC Roma =

Italian football club

- Full name: Hungaria FbC Roma

Hungaria FbC Roma was an Italian football club which was active in the early 1950s. Hungaria FbC Roma was made up entirely of Hungarian expatriate players, or players of Hungarian origin. The club didn't play in any official matches, and instead only participated in exhibition matches. However, despite this, it still managed to attract a number of international players. Hungaria disbanded while on tour in Colombia, leading to many of their players joining newly founded Unión Magdalena based in Santa Marta, a team that is currently playing in the Colombian top division, the Liga Águila.

== Famous players ==
- (France) (Hungary) Ferenc Nyers
- (Romania) (Spain) Nicolae Simatoc
