= Alexandru Baltagă =

Bessarabian politician, journalist, and Romanian Orthodox priest (1861–1941)

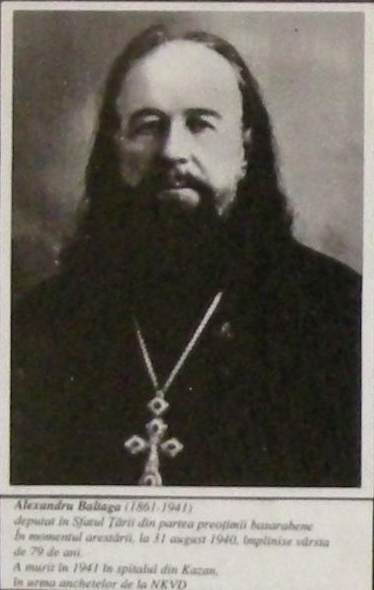

Member of the Sfatul Țării
- In office 1917–1918

Personal details
- Born: April 14, 1861 Lozova, Lăpușna County
- Died: August 7, 1941 (aged 80) Kazan, Soviet Union
- Resting place: Kazan
- Education: Chișinău Theological Seminary
- Profession: Priest
- Parents: Ștefan Baltagă

Alexandru Baltagă (April 14, 1861 – August 7, 1941) was a Bessarabian Romanian Orthodox priest, a founder of the Bessarabian religious press in the Romanian language, a member of Sfatul Țării (1917–1918), a Soviet political prisoner, and, according to the Orthodox Church, a martyr for the faith.

== In Russia ==
Son of Ștefan Baltagă, a priest, Alexandru followed the primary school in his home village of Lozova, Lăpușna County, Bessarabia, then under Russian rule. On June 15, 1883, he graduated with distinction from the Chișinău Theological Seminary, the capital of Bessarabia, after which he worked for two years in the same city as a teacher at the Teological School for Boys. He was ordained on January 26, 1886, as a deacon, and on February 2, 1886, as priest, being given the parish in the village of Călărași-Sat, Lăpușna County. In 1922, the village had 429 households. It was there that Fr. Baltagă adopted and raised two children, Vsevolod and Margareta.

In 1890–1905, he was an inspector for the Orhei church district, in 1905–1926 he was protopope of the 5th circle in the Orhei County, in 1928–1935 protopope of the 3rd circle in Lăpușna County. In 1931, he became protopope and president of the "priestly circle" of Lăpuşna. Since 1925 till his death, he was member of the Diocesan Assembly of the Archbishopric of Chişinău, and from 1932, he was the representative of the diocese in the National Church Congress of the Romanian Orthodox Church. In 1904–1922, Baltagă was the president of a revisory committee, and in 1922–1935, president of the Administrative Council of the "Union of Orthodox Clerics of Bessarabia". On July 1, 1935, he was retired, but the Metropolis of Bessarabia and the Romanian Ministry of Education and Religious Affairs, through a special decree, offered him the exceptional right of serving until death in the Călăraşi-Sat parish. He had the rank of mitrophorous oeconomus.

In 1893–1895, 1898, 1902, and 1919–1925, he was president of the School Congresses of Bessarabia. From 1903 till 1918 he was elected each year as president of the Annual Diocesan Congresses of Bessarabia. From 1908 on, he was one of the key aides of Gurie Grosu in the editing and printing of the Romanian language Bessarabian religious journal Luminătorul. In the first period, this journal served also as the diocesan bulletin of Bessarabia. Baltagă made crucial contributions to the establishment and functioning of the diocesan printing press in 1906–1917. Also in 1906–1917, he was a member of the Council of the Birth of Christ Brotherhood, and in 1911–1918, director of the 6-year school for church singers in Călăraşi-Târg.

== Political career ==
On the background of the dissolution of the Russian Empire, the Diocesan Congress in Chișinău (November 21–27, 1917 / December 4–10, 1917), elected him as a representative of the Bessarabian priesthood in Sfatul Țării. He also co-represented the Social Democratic Party-the Mensheviks. As an MP, on March 27, 1918 (OS April 9, 1918), he voted in favor of the Union of Bessarabia with Romania.

== Awards ==
Baltagă was held in high esteem, loved, and regarded as a spiritual father by his enoriași. It is being reported that he repeated many times "I would not allow my flock to be swallowed by the red wolves" (an allusion to the Bolshevik danger). When the Kazan Mother of God Icon was being shown around Bessarabia, his church was among those that displayed it. With the onslaught of the Soviet occupation of Bessarabia, Baltagă remained to serve in his church, despite the fact that it was well known that the former Sfatul Țării members were prime targets of the Soviets.

== Soviet persecution ==
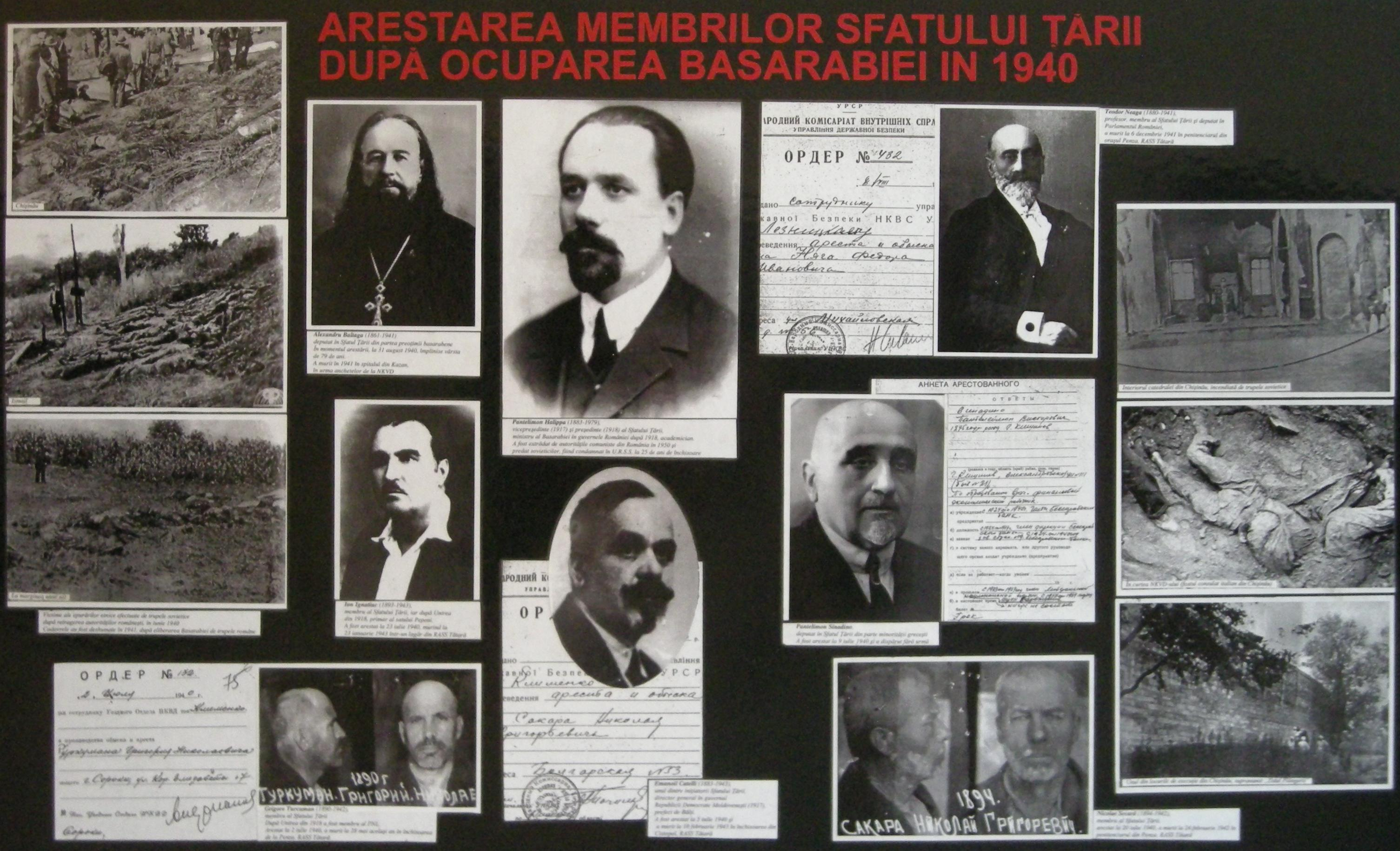
Bessarabia Sfatul Țării arrest

On August 31, 1940, while he was saying mass in St. Alexander's Church in Călăraşi, NKVD officers broke in and attempted to arrest him. Baltagă refused, saying he would follow them only after the mass. The political police had to retreat empty-handed. The following night, they snatched him from his bed, and without allowing him to dress, took him to Chișinău, where he was subjected to interrogation in the cellars of the NKVD building. His interrogator was NKVD lieutenant Cherepanov, a superior interrogator of the NKVD of the MSSR, who accused Alexandru Baltagă that "[...] in 1918, having an enemy attitude toward the Soviet Russia, he actively participated in Sfatul Țării, and voted for the estrangement of Bessarabia from Soviet Russia and for its Union with Romania [...] In the following year, as an active cleric, he fought against the revolutionary movement [...]" There exist reports that during his interrogation, Baltagă was subjected to physical and psychological pressure. It is reported that to investigators' questions "Show us your God!", he replied, "When you show me your mind, then I [would] show you my God!" (literal translation). After the Romanian Army crossed back into Bessarabia in early July 1941, the Soviets moved him to the interior of the USSR. He died what some Orthodox texts refer to as a martyr's death in Kazan on August 7, 1941.

Baltagă received numerous clerical and lay distinctions, including the Golden Cross of the Russian Holy Synod (April 18, 1903), St. Anna Order of third (May 6, 1907) and second class (May 6, 1912), St. Vladimir Order of the 4th degree, in gold (May 6, 1915), Star of Romania Order in the rank of officer (May 31, 1923), Order of the Crown of Romania, commander rank (June 13, 1928), the Order Ferdinand I, knight rank (June 8, 1935). In reference to his authority among the clergy, and his work for the church, Gala Galaction considered him "patriarch of the Bessarabian priests".

In October 1995, the Adunarea Eparhială of the Metropolis of Bessarabia proposed investigative research on Alexandru Baltagă's life, with a view toward canonisation.

Father Alexandru Baltagă was proposed for canonization in 2025 when the Romanian Orthodox Church will celebrate 140 years of autocephaly and 100 years since obtaining the status of a patriarchate.

== Bibliography ==
- Adrian Nicolae Petcu, Alexandru Baltagă, in Martiri pentru Hristos, din România, în perioada regimului communist, Editura Institutului Biblic și de Misiune al Bisericii Ortodoxe Române, București, 2007, pp. 68–71
