= Ferenc Nyers =

French footballer (1927–2001)

Personal information
- Full name: Ferenc Nyers
- Date of birth: 3 March 1927
- Place of birth: Freyming-Merlebach, France
- Date of death: 10 July 2001 (aged 74)
- Place of death: Le Grand-Bornand, France
- Position: Striker

Senior career*
Years	Team	Apps	(Gls)
1946–1948	Strasbourg	40	(19)
1948–1950	Lazio	36	(14)
1950	Hungaria FbC Roma		
1950–1951	Junior Barranquilla		
1952–1959	Saint-Étienne	61	(25)
Total		137	(58)
- * Club domestic league appearances and goals

Francois "Ferenc" Nyers (3 March 1927 – 10 July 2001), also known as Étienne Nyers, was a French professional footballer who played as a forward. He was active in France, Italy, Hungary and Colombia.

== Background ==
Nyers was born in Freyming-Merlebach, Moselle, France on 3 March 1927 to Hungarian immigrant parents. His older brother was fellow footballer István Nyers.

Nyers died in Le Grand-Bornand on 10 July 2001, at the age of 74.

== Career ==
Nyers played club football with Strasbourg, Lazio, Hungaria FbC Roma, Junior Barranquilla and Saint-Étienne.
