= Juanca Pineda =

Dominican footballer

Personal information
- Full name: Juan Carlos Pineda Torres
- Date of birth: 12 January 2000 (age 26)
- Place of birth: Azua, Dominican Republic
- Height: 1.80 m (5 ft 11 in)
- Position: Midfielder

Team information
- Current team: Sheriff (on loan from Beroe)
- Number: 77

Youth career
- –2019: Getafe

Senior career*
Years	Team	Apps	(Gls)
2019–2021	Torrijos	34	(3)
2021	Mirandés B	15	(5)
2021–2022	Burgos B	32	(1)
2022–2023	Unión Adarve	30	(3)
2023–2024	Guadalajara	29	(3)
2024–2026	Beroe	69	(8)
2026–	→ Sheriff (loan)	13	(2)

International career^{‡}
2018	Dominican Republic U20	5	(3)
2020–2021	Dominican Republic U23	3	(0)
2021–	Dominican Republic	22	(0)
- * Club domestic league appearances and goals as of 4 November 2026 ‡ National team caps and goals as of 5 October 2026

Juan Carlos "Juanca" Pineda Torres (born 12 January 2000) is a Dominican professional footballer who plays as a midfielder for Moldovan Liga club Sheriff Tiraspol, on loan from Beroe Stara Zagora and the Dominican Republic national team.

== International career ==
Pineda first represented the Dominican Republic at the 2018 CONCACAF U-20 Championship. He made his senior international debut in 2021.

== Career statistics ==
=== Club ===
As of match played 30 September 2026

Appearances and goals by club, season and competition
Club	Season	League			National cup (Note: Includes Copa del Rey, Bulgarian Cup)		Continental		Total	
Club	Season	Division	Apps	Goals	Apps	Goals	Apps	Goals	Apps	Goals
Torrijos	2019–20	Tercera División	25	3	0	0	—		25	3
Torrijos	2020–21	Tercera División	9	0	0	0	—		9	0
Torrijos	Total		34	3	0	0	—		34	3
Mirandes B	2020–21	Tercera Federación	15	5	0	0	—		15	5
Burgos B	2021–22	Segunda Federación	32	1	0	0	—		32	1
Unión Adarve	2022–23	Segunda Federación	30	3	1	0	—		31	3
Guadalajara	2023–24	Segunda Federación	29	3	1	1	—		30	4
Beroe	2024–25	Parva Liga	35	7	2	1	—		37	8
Beroe	2025–26	Parva Liga	35	1	1	0	—		36	1
Beroe	Total		70	8	3	1	—		73	9
Sheriff	2026–27	Moldovan Liga	13	2	0	0	2	1	15	3
Career total			223	24	5	2	2	1	230	27

=== International ===
As of match played 18 November 2025

Appearances and goals by national team and year
National team	Year	Apps	Goals
Dominican Republic U20	2018	5	3
Total		5	3
Dominican Republic U23	2020	3	0
Total		3	0
Dominican Republic	2021	1	0
Dominican Republic	2022	0	0
Dominican Republic	2023	3	0
Dominican Republic	2024	5	0
Dominican Republic	2025	9	0
Dominican Republic	2026	4	0
Dominican Republic	Total	22	0
Total		30	3
