= Samba Koné =

Malian footballer

Personal information
- Date of birth: 22 March 2002 (age 24)
- Place of birth: Bamako, Mali
- Height: 1.90 m (6 ft 3 in)
- Position: Midfielder

Team information
- Current team: Sheriff Tiraspol (on loan from Académico de Viseu)
- Number: 8

Youth career
- –2020: As Djiguiya Kkro

Senior career*
Years	Team	Apps	(Gls)
2020–2023	Derby Académie		
2020–2021	→ Leganés B (loan)	1	(0)
2021–2023	→ Porto B (loan)	39	(3)
2023–	Académico de Viseu	65	(3)
2026–	→ Sheriff Tiraspol (loan)	9	(4)
- * Club domestic league appearances and goals as of 19 June 2026

Samba Koné (born 22 March 2002) is a Malian professional footballer who plays as a midfielder for Moldovan Liga club Sheriff Tiraspol, on loan from Primeira Liga club Académico de Viseu.

== Career statistics ==
=== Club ===
As of match played 27 May 2023

Club	Season	League			National cup		League cup		Other		Total	
Club	Season	Division	Apps	Goals	Apps	Goals	Apps	Goals	Apps	Goals	Apps	Goals
Leganés B (loan)	2020–21	Tercera División	1	0	—		—		—		1	0
Porto B (loan)	2021–22	Liga Portugal 2	17	3	—		—		—		17	3
Porto B (loan)	2022–23	Liga Portugal 2	22	0	—		—		—		22	0
Porto B (loan)	Total		39	3	—		—		—		39	3
Career total			40	3	—		—		—		40	3
