= Samouil Izountouemoi =

Swedish footballer (born 1999)

Personal information
- Date of birth: 30 January 1999 (age 27)
- Place of birth: Sweden
- Position: Left winger

Team information
- Current team: Milsami Orhei
- Number: 21

Youth career
- –2018: Hammarby

Senior career*
Years	Team	Apps	(Gls)
2019–2020	Frej	40	(2)
2021	Dalkurd	25	(4)
2022–2024	Brage	53	(7)
2024	Gefle	9	(0)
2025	Jaro	9	(0)
2026–	Milsami Orhei	14	(0)
- * Club domestic league appearances and goals as of 24 August 2026

Samouil Izountouemoi (born 30 January 1999) is a Swedish professional footballer who plays as a left winger for Moldovan Liga club Milsami Orhei.
