= Grimăncăuți =

- Village
- Location within Moldova
- Coordinates: 48.3894444444°N 27.0897222222°E
- Country: Moldova
- District: Briceni District

Government
  - Primarul: GUTU LAURENTIU (PLDM)

Population (2014 census)
  - Total: 3,988
- Time zone: UTC+2 (EET)
  - Summer (DST): UTC+3 (EEST)
- Postal code: MD-4726
- Website: www.grimancauti.com

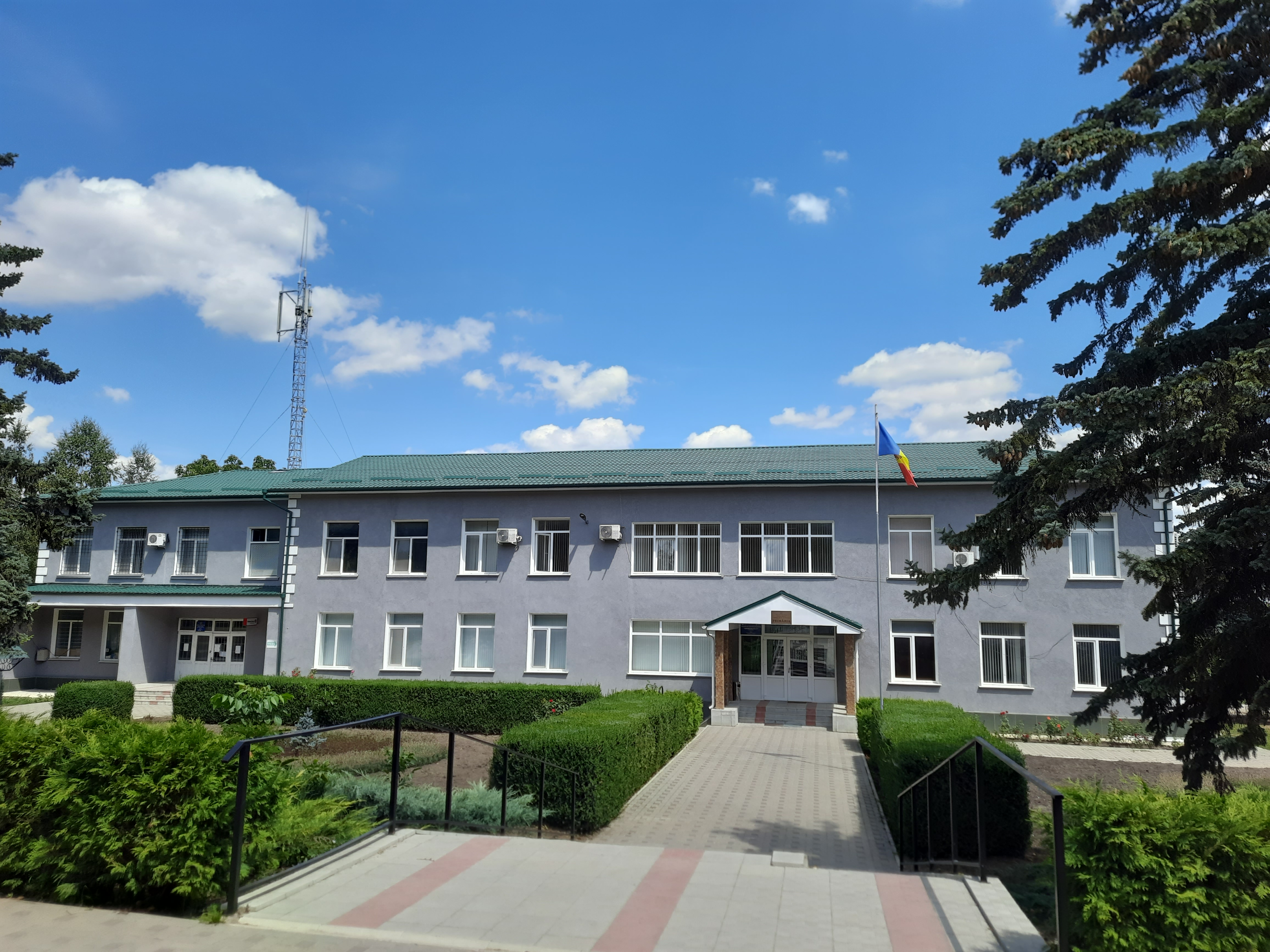
Grimăncăuți

Grimăncăuți is a village in Briceni District, Moldova.
