= Țarigrad =

- Village
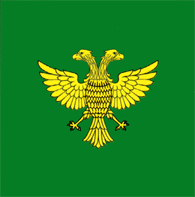
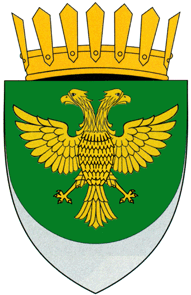
- Flag Coat of arms

- Location within Moldova
- Coordinates: 48.0413888889°N 27.765°E
- Country: Moldova
- District: Drochia District

Government
  - Mayor: Haghit (PCRM)

Population (2014 census)
  - Total: 3,997
- Time zone: UTC+2 (EET)
  - Summer (DST): UTC+3 (EEST)

Țarigrad is a village in Drochia District, Moldova. At the 2004 census, the commune had 4,655 inhabitants.

== Notable natives ==
- Ion Costaș
