= Kabamba Kalabatama =

Norwegian footballer

Personal information
- Full name: Kabamba Tumba Kalabatama
- Date of birth: 27 January 2002 (age 24)
- Place of birth: Lusaka, Zambia
- Height: 1.85 m (6 ft 1 in)
- Position: Forward

Team information
- Current team: Sheriff Tiraspol
- Number: 9

Youth career
- Bjørnevatn

Senior career*
Years	Team	Apps	(Gls)
2014–2019	Bjørnevatn	40	(15)
2016–2019	Bjørnevatn 2	14	(21)
2020–2021	TPS	3	(0)
2022–2023	Moss	19	(7)
2022–2023	Moss 2	10	(13)
2023	→ Kvik Halden (loan)	7	(4)
2023	Ullensaker/Kisa	13	(5)
2024–2025	Skeid	22	(5)
2025–2026	Milsami Orhei	33	(8)
2026–	Sheriff Tiraspol	1	(0)
- * Club domestic league appearances and goals as of 10 August 2026

Kabamba Tumba Kalabatama (born 27 January 2002) is a Norwegian footballer who plays as a forward for Moldovan Liga club Sheriff Tiraspol.

== Career ==
Kalabatama was born in Lusaka, Zambia, to Congolese parents. At the age of 5 his family moved to Norway. He made his senior debut for Bjørnevatn at the age of 12 on 25 June 2014. This resulted in him being banned from senior football until he reached 15, because he was too young. In February 2020, he signed for Finnish Veikkausliiga side TPS. He returned to Norway in January 2022, signing a two-year contract with Moss.

On 3 August 2023, Ullensaker/Kisa announced the signing of Kalabatama.

On 8 August 2026, Sheriff Tiraspol announced the signing of Kalabatama from Milsami Orhei.

== Career statistics ==
As of match played 22 October 2022

Appearances and goals by club, season and competition
Club	Season	League			Cup		Other		Total	
Club	Season	Division	Apps	Goals	Apps	Goals	Apps	Goals	Apps	Goals
Bjørnevatn	2014	Norwegian Third Division	1	0	0	0	—		1	0
Bjørnevatn	2015	Norwegian Third Division	0	0	0	0	—		0	0
Bjørnevatn	2016	Norwegian Third Division	0	0	0	0	—		0	0
Bjørnevatn	2017	Norwegian Fourth Division	11	5	1 (Note: Appearances in Norwegian Cup qualifying)	1	—		12	6
Bjørnevatn	2018	Norwegian Third Division	20	5	0	0	—		20	5
Bjørnevatn	2019	Norwegian Fourth Division	8	5	2	3	—		10	8
Bjørnevatn	Total		40	15	3	4	0	0	43	19
Bjørnevatn 2	2016	Norwegian Fifth Division	1	1	—		—		1	1
Bjørnevatn 2	2017	Norwegian Fifth Division	6	8	—		—		6	8
Bjørnevatn 2	2018	Norwegian Fifth Division	4	4	—		—		4	4
Bjørnevatn 2	2019	Norwegian Fifth Division	3	8	—		—		3	8
Bjørnevatn 2	Total		14	21	0	0	0	0	14	21
TPS	2020	Veikkausliiga	0	0	2 (Note: Appearances in the Finnish Cup)	0	0	0	2	0
TPS	2021	Ykkönen	3	0	3	0	—		6	0
TPS	Total		3	0	5	0	0	0	8	0
Moss	2022	Norwegian Second Division	18	7	3 (Note: Appearances in the Norwegian Cup)	0	—		21	6
Moss	2023	Norwegian First Division	1	0	1	1	—		2	1
Moss	Total		19	7	4	1	0	0	23	8
Moss 2	2022	Norwegian Fourth Division	5	8	–		—		5	8
Moss 2	2023	Norwegian Fourth Division	5	5	–		—		5	5
Moss 2	Total		10	13	0	0	0	0	10	13
Kvik Halden	2023	Norwegian Second Division	7	4	0	0	—		7	4
Ullensaker/Kisa	2023	Norwegian Second Division	2	0	0	0	—		2	0
Career total			95	60	12	5	0	0	107	65
