= Vladimir Fratea =

Moldovan footballer

Personal information
- Date of birth: 27 July 2003 (age 23)
- Height: 1.75 m (5 ft 9 in)
- Position: Right winger

Team information
- Current team: Sheriff Tiraspol
- Number: 10

Youth career
- 2010–2016: CSCT Buiucani
- 2016–2019: Juniorul București
- 2019–2022: 1. FC Köln

Senior career*
Years	Team	Apps	(Gls)
2022	1. FC Köln II	2	(0)
2023	Gagra	3	(0)
2023–2024	Akritas Chlorakas	20	(3)
2024	Spartakos Kitiou	9	(2)
2025	Zimbru-2 Chișinău	2	(4)
2025–2026	Zimbru Chișinău	24	(8)
2026–	Sheriff Tiraspol	16	(4)

International career^{‡}
2021	Moldova U19	5	(1)
2023	Moldova U21	1	(0)
2025–	Moldova	9	(0)
- * Club domestic league appearances and goals as of 7 November 2026 ‡ National team caps and goals as of 13 November 2026

Vladimir Fratea (born 27 July 2003) is a Moldovan professional footballer who plays as a right winger for Moldovan Liga club Sheriff Tiraspol and the Moldova national team.

== Club career ==
Fratea made his senior debut for 1. FC Köln II on 22 January 2022, aged 18, after coming on as an 44th-minute substitute in a Regionalliga West match with Rot-Weiß Oberhausen.

== International career ==
Fratea has represented Romania at under-15 level and was part of the team that played in the Gallini Cup in 2018. On 26 September 2025, Fratea received his first call up to the senior Moldova squad for the friendly match against Romania and the 2026 FIFA World Cup qualifying match against Estonia, but pulled out due to injury. He made his senior debut on 13 November 2025, appearing as a 75th-minute substitute in a 0–2 2026 FIFA World Cup qualifying loss against Italy. Three days later, he made his first international start in a 1–4 loss to Israel.

== Honours ==
=== Club ===
Zimbru-2 Chișinău

- Liga 2: 2024–25

Zimbru Chișinău

- Moldovan Cup runner-up: 2025–26
