= Caio Dantas (footballer, born 2003) =

Brazilian footballer

Personal information
- Full name: Caio Dantas Batista de Maria
- Date of birth: 14 April 2003 (age 23)
- Place of birth: Mesquita, Rio de Janeiro, Brazil
- Height: 1.71 m (5 ft 7 in)
- Position: Midfielder

Team information
- Current team: Zimbru Chișinău
- Number: 7

Youth career
- –2022: Vasco da Gama
- 2023–2024: Fortaleza

Senior career*
Years	Team	Apps	(Gls)
2025	Torpedo Moscow	0	(0)
2025	→ Torpedo-BelAZ Zhodino (loan)	9	(0)
2025–	Zimbru Chișinău	16	(2)
- * Club domestic league appearances and goals as of 1 June 2026

Caio Dantas Batista de Maria (born 14 April 2003) is a Brazilian professional footballer who plays as a midfielder for Moldovan Liga club Zimbru Chișinău.

== Club career ==
He made his debut in the Belarusian Premier League for Torpedo-BelAZ Zhodino on 30 March 2025 in a game against Dinamo Minsk.
