= Lozova, Strășeni =

Lozova
- Commune
- Interactive map of Lozova
- Location within Moldova
- Coordinates: 47.1327777778°N 28.3855555556°E
- Country: Moldova
- District: Strășeni District

Government
  - Mayor: Viorel Jardan

Population (2014)
  - Total: 6,196
- Time zone: UTC+2 (EET)
  - Summer (DST): UTC+3 (EEST)

Lozova is a commune in Strășeni District, Moldova. It is composed of two villages, Lozova and Stejăreni. Lozova was founded in 1424.

== People from Lozova ==
- Alexandru Baltagă, Romanian-Bessarabian priest and anti-Soviet activist
- Victor Spinei, Romanian historian and archaeologist
- Zlata Tkach, Moldovan composer and music educator
