= 2023–24 Moldovan Cup =

2023–24 Cupa Moldovei
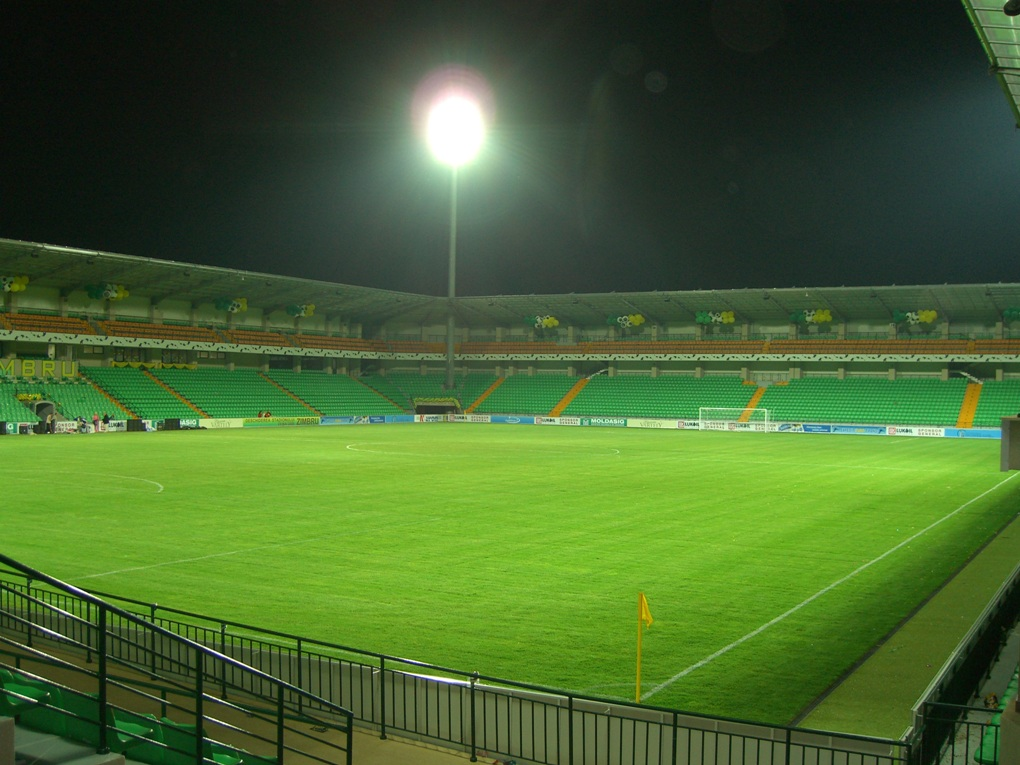
- Zimbru Stadium in Chișinău hosted the final

Tournament details
- Country: Moldova
- Dates: 16 August 2023 – 25 May 2024
- Teams: 43

Final positions
- Champions: Petrocub Hîncești
- Runners-up: Zimbru Chișinău

Tournament statistics
- Matches played: 48
- Goals scored: 201 (4.19 per match)

The 2023–24 Moldovan Cup (Romanian: Cupa Moldovei) was the 33rd season of the annual Moldovan football cup competition. The competition started on 16 August 2023 with the preliminary round and concluded with the final on 25 May 2024.

== Format and Schedule ==
In the preliminary round and the first two rounds proper, ties are formed based on geographical considerations, and no draw is conducted. Home advantage is granted to the team from the lower league. If both teams belong to the same division, the team that achieved a higher position in the previous league season will play their tie at home.
For the round of 16, home advantage is given to teams from the Super Liga. In the first legs of the quarter-finals and semi-finals, the home team will be the one with a higher ranking in the current league season. The final match will be hosted by the team ranked higher in the current league season.

Round	Match dates	Fixtures	Clubs
Preliminary round	16 August 2023	3	43 → 40
First round	29 August 2023	16	40 → 24
Second round	3 October 2023	8	24 → 16
Round of 16	31 October 2023, 1 November 2023	8	16 → 8
Quarter-finals	2–3 March 2024 (1st leg); 3–4 April 2024 (2nd leg)	8	8 → 4
Semi-finals	24 April 2024 (1st leg); 1 May 2024 (2nd leg)	4	4 → 2
Final	25 May 2024	1	2 → 1

== Participating clubs ==
The following teams entered the competition:

Super Liga the 8 teams of the 2023–24 season	Liga 1 the 11 teams of the 2023–24 season	Liga 2 the 24 teams of the 2023–24 season
Sheriff Tiraspol ^{title holder}; Bălți ^{runner-up}; Petrocub Hîncești; Zimbru Chișinău; Milsami Orhei; Dacia Buiucani; Florești; Spartanii Sportul	Dinamo-Auto; Victoria Chișinău; Fălești; Speranis Nisporeni; Real Succes; Saksan; Speranța Drochia; Olimp Comrat; Iskra Rîbnița; Univer Comrat; FCM Ungheni	Inter Soroca; Stăuceni; Pepeni; Locomotiva Ocnița; La Familia; Edineț; Cricova; Vulturii Cutezători; Congaz; Țarigrad; Atletic Strășeni; Olimpia Bălți; Slobozia Mare; EFA Visoca; Codru Călărași; FC Visoca; Socol Copceac; Grănicerul Glodeni; Maiak Chirsova; Rîșcani; Barsa Ungheni; Chișinău; Constructorul Leova; Ghidighici

== Preliminary round ==
6 clubs from the Liga 2 entered this round. 18 clubs from the Liga 2 received a bye for the preliminary round. Matches were played on 16 August 2023.

16 August 2023	FC Visoca (3)	1–0	EFA Visoca (3)	Visoca
17:30 EEST	Pavlov 57'	Report		Stadium: Visoca Stadium; Attendance: 200; Referee: Roman Romanov

16 August 2023	Ghidighici (3)	4–3	Maiak Chirsova (3)	Ghidighici
17:30 EEST	Nemerenco 20', 48'; Ursachilă 22'; Motricală 28'	Report	Spiridon 40', 76'; Bacalu 78'	Stadium: Ghidighici Stadium; Attendance: 200; Referee: Nicolae Ciornîi

16 August 2023	Constructorul Leova (3)	5–2	Socol Copceac (3)	Leova
17:30 EEST	Cojocea 39'; Cravcenco 49'; Stoleru 67', 86'; Jugaru 90+1'	Report	Uzun 14'; Ceavdari 90+3'	Stadium: Leova Stadium; Attendance: 150; Referee: Cătălin Pidghirnîi

== First round ==
21 clubs from the Liga 2 and 11 clubs from the Liga 1 entered this round. Matches were played on 29 August 2023.

29 August 2023	Edineț (3)	3–5	Fălești (2)	Edineț
17:00 EEST	Popovici 19', 66'; Eșanu 40'	Report	Noroc 29'; Maneacov 45+2' (pen.), 45+4', 52'; Golovatîi 49'	Stadium: Edineț Stadium; Attendance: 200; Referee: Serghei Gavriliuc

29 August 2023	Olimpia Bălți (3)	3–3 (a.e.t.) (4–5 p)	Pepeni (3)	Bălți
17:00 EEST	Dobrovinschi 7'; Hovanschi 90'; Climenciuc 90+2'	Report	Maxian 28'; Locoman 30'; Botnaru 40'	Stadium: Locomotiv Stadium; Attendance: 150; Referee: Alexandru Stefciuc
	Penalties
	Proțiuc (penalty scored); Mateițov (penalty scored); Țîmpov (penalty scored); Hovanschi (penalty scored); Cheptenari (penalty missed); Vasilat (penalty missed)		(penalty scored) Lopotenco; (penalty scored) Botnaru; (penalty scored) Croitoru; (penalty missed) Bounegru; (penalty scored) Maxian; (penalty scored) Beliniuc

29 August 2023	Țarigrad (3)	0–2	Locomotiva Ocnița (3)	Țarigrad
17:00 EEST		Report	Goreacioc 57'; Bacalîm 90' (o.g.)	Stadium: Țarigrad Stadium; Attendance: 100; Referee: Ivan Luca

29 August 2023	Rîșcani (3)	0–3	Grănicerul Glodeni (3)	Rîșcani
17:00 EEST		Report	Fanea 10'; Balea 51', 72'	Stadium: Rîșcani Stadium; Attendance: 100; Referee: Nicolae Bălțătescu

29 August 2023	Barsa Ungheni (3)	2–3 (a.e.t.)	FCM Ungheni (2)	Ungheni
17:00 EEST	Ciocan 10'; Pahomea 32' (pen.)	Report	Vatavu 72'; Tofan 90+2'; Bereghici 112'	Stadium: Ungheni Stadium; Attendance: 200; Referee: Oleg Stoianov

29 August 2023	Chișinău (3)	0–2	Speranis Nisporeni (2)	Nisporeni
17:00 EEST		Report	Stratan 31' (pen.); Danilov 83'	Stadium: Nisporeni Stadium; Attendance: 100; Referee: Cătălin Pidghirnîi

29 August 2023	Cricova (3)	2–3	Victoria Chișinău (2)	Cricova
17:00 EEST	Stropșa 11'; Rîbacioc 74' (pen.)	Report	Coșcodan 22', 38'; Blajchin 52'	Stadium: Cricova Stadium; Referee: Grigore Ciugui

29 August 2023	Inter Soroca (3)	0–3	Iskra Rîbnița (2)	Soroca
17:00 EEST		Report	Popovici 9'; Negară 70' (pen.); Iurcu 76'	Stadium: Soroca Stadium; Attendance: 50; Referee: Ion Tudos

29 August 2023	FC Visoca (3)	2–1	Speranța Drochia (2)	Visoca
17:00 EEST	Pavlov 45'; Coroliuc 46'	Report	Cerescu 78' (pen.)	Stadium: Visoca Stadium; Attendance: 20; Referee: Roman Romanov

29 August 2023	Ghidighici (3)	0–3	Real Succes (2)	Ghidighici
17:00 EEST		Report	Gurulea 48' (pen.); Platovschi 51'; Strătilă 59'	Stadium: Ghidighici Stadium; Attendance: 50; Referee: Vladislav Stoianov

29 August 2023	Constructorul Leova (3)	0–0 (a.e.t.) (4–2 p)	Olimp Comrat (2)	Leova
17:00 EEST		Report		Stadium: Leova Stadium; Attendance: 300; Referee: Denis Ivlev
	Penalties
	Stoleru (penalty scored); Cravcenco (penalty scored); Todorov (penalty scored); Simcenco (penalty missed); Carp (penalty scored)		(penalty missed) Chirciu; (penalty scored) Radov; (penalty scored) Ojog; (penalty missed) Nosenco

29 August 2023	La Familia (3)	2–3	Dinamo-Auto (2)	Bender
17:00 EEST	Boligari 55'; Melnic 90'	Report	Murzac 13'; Jacob 67'; Okwudili 85' (pen.)	Stadium: Bender Stadium; Referee: Andrei Ghetmanciuc

29 August 2023	Codru Călărași (3)	0–2	Stăuceni (3)	Călărași
17:00 EEST		Report	Ceavdari 54', 55'	Stadium: Călărași Stadium; Attendance: 50; Referee: Alexandru Gîrneț

29 August 2023	Vulturii Cutezători (3)	4–0	Atletic Strășeni (3)	Sîngerei
17:00 EEST	Moșneaga 23'; Secureanu 47', 50'; Morari 78'	Report		Stadium: Sîngerei Stadium; Attendance: 100; Referee: Oleg Pînzari

29 August 2023	Congaz (3)	1–9	Saksan (2)	Ceadîr-Lunga
17:00 EEST	Iepure 74'	Report	Aliyu 20'; L. Bamba 23', 34', 64'; Umar 43', 90+4'; Abba 58', 90+1'; M. Bamba 71'	Stadium: Ceadîr-Lunga Stadium; Attendance: 100; Referee: Mihail Borisov

29 August 2023	Slobozia Mare (3)	4–1	Univer Comrat (2)	Slobozia Mare
17:00 EEST	Maximov 18'; Boca 55'; Borza 78'; Caraivan 79'	Report	Botnarenco 33'	Stadium: Slobozia Mare Stadium; Attendance: 50; Referee: Gheorghe Dandeș

== Second round ==
The 16 winners from the previous round entered this round. Matches were played on 3 October 2023.

3 October 2023	Pepeni (3)	0–1	Fălești (2)	Pepeni
15:00 EEST		Report	Maneacov 81'	Stadium: Pepeni Stadium; Attendance: 100; Referee: Petru Ciorbă

3 October 2023	Grănicerul Glodeni (3)	0–1	Locomotiva Ocnița (3)	Glodeni
15:00 EEST		Report	Pavlov 34'	Stadium: Glodeni Stadium; Attendance: 200; Referee: Nicolae Bălțătescu

3 October 2023	FCM Ungheni (2)	3–2	Speranis Nisporeni (2)	Ungheni
15:00 EEST	Lavric 45' (o.g.); Roman 58'; Vatavu 87'	Report	Porojniuc 37', 40'	Stadium: Ungheni Stadium; Attendance: 200; Referee: Mihail Borisov

3 October 2023	Iskra Rîbnița (2)	0–6	Victoria Chișinău (2)	Rîbnița
15:00 EEST		Report	Orbu 29', 40', 56'; Arabadji 45'; Molla 70' (pen.); Crîcimari 89'	Stadium: Rîbnița Stadium; Attendance: 50; Referee: Victor Bughenco

3 October 2023	FC Visoca (3)	1–2	Real Succes (2)	Chișinău
15:00 EEST	Țurcan 83' (pen.)	Report	Gaiu 54' (pen.); Zamurca 74'	Stadium: Real Succes; Attendance: 50; Referee: Ion Tudos

3 October 2023	Constructorul Leova (3)	4–0	Dinamo-Auto (2)	Leova
15:00 EEST	Stoleru 7', 70'; Carp 53'; Putregai 72'	Report		Stadium: Leova Stadium; Attendance: 200; Referee: Alexandru Gîrneț

3 October 2023	Vulturii Cutezători (3)	2–4	Stăuceni (3)	Sîngerei
15:00 EEST	Maga 23', 90'	Report	Josan 6'; Andronic 43' (o.g.); Paladi 57'; Miciu 66'	Stadium: Sîngerei Stadium; Attendance: 100; Referee: Daniel Luca

3 October 2023	Slobozia Mare (3)	0–5	Saksan (2)	Slobozia Mare
15:00 EEST		Report	Gontran 8', 31'; Guibero 29'; Umar 67'; Leu 73' (pen.)	Stadium: Slobozia Mare Stadium; Attendance: 100; Referee: Gheorghe Dandeș

== Final stage ==
=== Bracket ===
Round of 16
Petrocub Hîncești	9
Saksan	1
Spartanii Sportul	1
Stăuceni	5
Bălți	7
Constructorul Leova	0
Dacia Buiucani	4
Real Succes	2
Milsami Orhei	2
Fălești	0
Zimbru Chișinău	7
Locomotiva Ocnița	0
Sheriff Tiraspol	5
FCM Ungheni	0
Florești	1 (4)
Victoria Chișinău (a.e.t.) (p)	1 (5)

Quarter-finals
Petrocub Hîncești	8	4	12
Stăuceni	0	1	1
Bălți	2	1	3
Dacia Buiucani	1	1	2
Milsami Orhei	1	0	1
Zimbru Chișinău	2	3	5
Sheriff Tiraspol	2	3	5
Victoria Chișinău	0	1	1

Semi-finals
Petrocub Hîncești	5	1	6
Bălți	1	0	1
Zimbru Chișinău	1	1	2
Sheriff Tiraspol	0	1	1

Final
Petrocub Hîncești	3
Zimbru Chișinău	1

== Round of 16 ==
The 8 winners from the previous round and 8 clubs from the Super Liga entered this round. The draw was held on 10 October 2023. Matches were played on 31 October and 1 November 2023.

31 October 2023	Zimbru Chișinău (1)	7–0	Locomotiva Ocnița (3)	Chișinău
13:00 EET	Blajco 10' (o.g.); Răileanu 20'; Ștefan 23'; Alaribe 30', 36'; Căruntu 58'; Bîtca 75' (pen.)	Report		Stadium: Zimbru-2; Attendance: 100; Referee: Stanislav Leu

31 October 2023	Spartanii Sportul (1)	1–5	Stăuceni (3)	Suruceni
13:00 EET	Șumchin 39'	Report	Ceavdari 13'; Paladi 54', 67'; Josan 88'; Țîgîrlaș 90+2'	Stadium: Suruceni Stadium; Attendance: 50; Referee: Victor Bughenco

31 October 2023	Milsami Orhei (1)	2–0	Fălești (2)	Orhei
18:00 EET	Lambarschi 15'; Gînsari 81'	Report		Stadium: Sport Complex; Attendance: 1,100; Referee: Ghenadie Sidenco

31 October 2023	Petrocub Hîncești (1)	9–1	Saksan (2)	Hîncești
18:00 EET	M. Plătică 4', 19', 50'; Ambros 8'; Pușcaș 73', 88'; Sandu 75', 81'; Demian 86'	Report	Gla 48'	Stadium: Hîncești Stadium; Attendance: 817; Referee: Andrei Cojocaru

1 November 2023	Florești (1)	1–1 (a.e.t.) (4–5 p)	Victoria Chișinău (2)	Bender
13:00 EET	Picus 67'	Report	Arabadji 38' (pen.)	Stadium: Bender Stadium; Attendance: 100; Referee: Andrei Diordiev
	Penalties
	Covcenco (penalty scored); Oancea (penalty scored); Solodovnicov (penalty missed); Suvorov (penalty scored); Muntean (penalty scored)		(penalty scored) Molla; (penalty scored) Coșcodan; (penalty scored) Orbu; (penalty scored) Postoroncă; (penalty scored) Crîcimari

1 November 2023	Dacia Buiucani (1)	4–2	Real Succes (2)	Chișinău
13:00 EET	Botnari 6'; Bîtlan 16'; Bivol 26'; Lupașco 68'	Report	Cilipic 41'; Strătilă 73'	Stadium: Joma Arena; Attendance: 200; Referee: Iurie Covtun

1 November 2023	Sheriff Tiraspol (1)	5–0	FCM Ungheni (2)	Tiraspol
18:00 EET	João Paulo 17'; Luvannor 40'; Garananga 45', 73'; Forov 89'	Report		Stadium: Sheriff small Arena; Attendance: 200; Referee: Denis Ivlev

1 November 2023	Bălți (1)	7–0	Constructorul Leova (3)	Bălți
18:00 EET	Nsue 19'; Mișcov 22', 62', 84' (pen.); Andrézinho 47', 82'; Kleiton 60'	Report		Stadium: Bălți Stadium; Attendance: 500; Referee: Ion Tudos

== Quarter-finals ==
The first legs were played on 2 and 3 March 2024 and the second legs on 3 and 4 April 2024.

2 March 2024 1st leg	Petrocub Hîncești (1)	8–0	Stăuceni (3)	Hîncești
14:00 EET	Ambros 16'; Jardan 19', 22'; S. Plătică 45'; M. Plătică 73', 80'; Miciu 84' (o.g.); Cotogoi 87'	Report		Stadium: Hîncești Stadium; Attendance: 300; Referee: Ion Orlic

3 April 2024 2nd leg	Stăuceni (3)	1–4 (1 – 12 agg.)	Petrocub Hîncești (1)	Stăuceni
14:00 EEST	Trofim 51'	Report	Axenti 78'; S. Plătică 81'; Abagna 83'; Basit 84'	Stadium: Olimp Stadium; Attendance: 100; Referee: Ion Bîlea

2 March 2024 1st leg	Bălți (1)	2–1	Dacia Buiucani (1)	Bălți
14:00 EET	Păscăluță 73'; Andrézinho 86' (pen.)	Report	Lupașco 58'	Stadium: Bălți Stadium; Attendance: 1,520; Referee: Dumitru Muntean

4 April 2024 2nd leg	Dacia Buiucani (1)	1–1 (2 – 3 agg.)	Bălți (1)	Chișinău
14:00 EEST	Butucel 3'	Report	Păscăluță 45+1'	Stadium: Joma Arena; Attendance: 150; Referee: Stanislav Leu

3 March 2024 1st leg	Milsami Orhei (1)	1–2	Zimbru Chișinău (1)	Orhei
14:00 EET	Milić 65'	Report	Alaribe 72'; Dedechko 90+5'	Stadium: Sport Complex; Attendance: 1,100; Referee: Igor Boșca

3 April 2024 2nd leg	Zimbru Chișinău (1)	3–0 (5 – 1 agg.)	Milsami Orhei (1)	Chișinău
16:00 EEST	~~Ștefan 72'~~	Report	~~Lambarschi 14'~~; ~~Luchița 90+4'~~; ~~Gînsari 105' (pen.)~~	Stadium: Zimbru Stadium; Attendance: 450; Referee: Andrei Cojocaru
Note: The match originally ended 1–3 for Milsami after extra time. Milsami used a total of six substitutes in the regular time, while only five were allowed, and were disqualified after a protest by Zimbru.

3 March 2024 1st leg	Sheriff Tiraspol (1)	2–0	Victoria Chișinău (2)	Tiraspol
14:00 EET	Ghecev 42'; Nevers 84'	Report		Stadium: Sheriff Indoor Arena; Attendance: 750; Referee: Andrei Ceban

3 April 2024 2nd leg	Victoria Chișinău (2)	1–3 (1 – 5 agg.)	Sheriff Tiraspol (1)	Chișinău
14:00 EEST	Namolovan 52'	Report	Ferreira 5'; Forov 22'; Akanbi 80'	Stadium: Joma Arena; Attendance: 250; Referee: Ion Tudos

== Semi-finals ==
The first legs were played on 24 April 2024 and the second legs on 1 May 2024.

24 April 2024 1st leg	Zimbru Chișinău (1)	1–0	Sheriff Tiraspol (1)	Chișinău
19:00 EEST	Guera Djou 59'	Report		Stadium: Zimbru Stadium; Attendance: 1,200; Referee: Daniel Luca

1 May 2024 2nd leg	Sheriff Tiraspol (1)	1–1 (1 – 2 agg.)	Zimbru Chișinău (1)	Tiraspol
19:00 EEST	João Paulo 32'	Report	Alaribe 25'	Stadium: Sheriff small Arena; Attendance: 1,300; Referee: Petru Stoianov

24 April 2024 1st leg	Petrocub Hîncești (1)	5–1	Bălți (1)	Hîncești
19:00 EEST	Abagna 5', 31'; Lupan 72'; Demian 80'; Mudrac 83'	Report	Damașcan 11'	Stadium: Hîncești Stadium; Attendance: 580; Referee: Dumitru Muntean

1 May 2024 2nd leg	Bălți (1)	0–1 (1 – 6 agg.)	Petrocub Hîncești (1)	Bălți
19:00 EEST		Report	Lupan 57'	Stadium: Bălți Stadium; Attendance: 1,391; Referee: Ion Orlic

== Final ==
The final was played on Saturday 25 May 2024 at the Zimbru Stadium in Chișinău.

25 May 2024
20:00 EEST

Petrocub Hîncești	3–1	Zimbru Chișinău
Lungu 58'; Jardan 77'; Lupan 79'	Report	Alaribe 6'

Zimbru Stadium, Chișinău
Attendance: 7,542
Referee: Daniel Luca (Moldova)

Petrocub	Zimbru

GK	16	(Ghana) Razak Abalora
DF	4	(Moldova) Victor Mudrac
DF	11	(Moldova) Sergiu Plătică
DF	21	(Moldova) Maxim Potîrniche	(yellow card) 12'	(substituted off) 46'
DF	90	(Moldova) Ion Jardan	(yellow card) 81'
MF	17	(Ghana) David Abagna
MF	19	(Moldova) Mihail Plătică
MF	37	(Moldova) Dan Pușcaș		(substituted off) 65'
MF	39	(Moldova) Teodor Lungu
FW	9	(Moldova) Vladimir Ambros (c)		(substituted off) 90+6'
FW	78	(Moldova) Nicky Cleșcenco		(substituted off) 57'
Substitutes:
GK	1	(Moldova) Silviu Șmalenea
GK	32	(Moldova) Dumitru Covali
DF	5	(Moldova) Cristian Axenti
DF	46	(Moldova) Danil Andreiciu
DF	66	(Moldova) Ion Borș		(substituted on) 46'
MF	8	(Moldova) Dumitru Demian
MF	20	(Cameroon) Donalio Melachio		(substituted on) 65'
MF	23	(Moldova) Mihai Lupan		(substituted on) 57'
MF	94	(Moldova) Corneliu Cotogoi		(substituted on) 90+6'
MF	97	(Moldova) Marius Iosipoi
FW	70	(Ghana) Seidu Basit
Head Coach:
(Moldova) Andrei Martin

GK	35	(Moldova) Nicolae Cebotari
DF	3	(Moldova) Ștefan Burghiu (c)
DF	30	(Moldova) Andrei Macrițchii
DF	33	(Moldova) Mihail Ștefan
DF	69	(Ukraine) Denys Dedechko	(yellow card) 90+1'
MF	8	(Cameroon) Jessie Guera Djou
MF	18	(Guinea) Ibrahima Soumah	(yellow card) 29'	(substituted off) 62'
MF	44	(Moldova) Denis Furtună		(substituted off) 62'
MF	77	(Moldova) Vladimir Ghinaitis		(substituted off) 73'
FW	20	(Nigeria) Emmanuel Alaribe	(yellow card) 68'
FW	66	(Nigeria) Justice Ohajunwa		(substituted off) 62'
Substitutes:
GK	31	(Moldova) Sebastian Agachi
DF	21	(Moldova) Mihai Morozan		(substituted on) 82'
DF	23	(Moldova) David Dimitrișin
DF	25	(Romania) Alexandru Misarăș
MF	7	(Moldova) Constantin Sandu		(substituted on) 62'	(substituted off) 82'
MF	10	(Moldova) Vlad Răileanu		(substituted on) 62'
MF	19	(Moldova) Ștefan Bîtca	(yellow card) 85'	(substituted on) 73'
FW	4	(Moldova) Nichita Covali
FW	9	(Moldova) Marin Căruntu		(substituted on) 62'
Head Coach:
(Moldova) Lilian Popescu

Assistant referees:
Vladislav Lifciu (Moldova)
Vadim Vicol (Moldova)
Additional assistant referees:
Petru Stoianov (Moldova)
Andrei Breguța (Moldova)
Fourth official:
Victor Luchița (Moldova)

Match rules

- 90 minutes.
- 30 minutes of extra time if necessary.
- Penalty shoot-out if score is still level.
- Eleven named substitutes.
- Maximum of five substitutions, with a sixth allowed in extra time.
