= 2023–24 Moldovan Liga 1 =

Moldovan football's second-tier league

Liga 1
- Season: 2023–24
- Dates: 18 August 2023 – 8 May 2024
- Champions: Florești
- Promoted: Florești; Spartanii Sportul
- Relegated: Real Succes

The 2023–24 Moldovan Liga 1 was the 33rd season of Moldovan football's second-tier league. The season started on 18 August 2023 and concluded on 8 May 2024, with play-off matches played between 4 and 23 May for a place in Super Liga next season.

== Teams ==
Location of teams in 2023–24 Liga 1

Club	Location	Ground
Dinamo-Auto	Tiraspol	Dinamo-Auto (Tîrnauca)
Fălești	Fălești	Fălești Stadium
Iskra	Rîbnița	Rîbnița Stadium
Olimp	Comrat	Comrat Stadium
Real Succes	Chișinău	Real Succes
Saksan	Ceadîr-Lunga	Ceadîr-Lunga Stadium
Sheriff-2	Tiraspol	Sheriff training field
Speranis	Nisporeni	Mircea Eliade
Speranța	Drochia	Drochia Stadium
Univer	Comrat	Comrat Stadium
FCM Ungheni	Ungheni	Ungheni Stadium
Victoria	Chișinău	Joma Arena
2 relegated teams from 2023–24 Moldovan Super Liga
Florești	Florești	Bender Stadium (Bender)
Spartanii Sportul	Selemet	Real Succes (Chișinău)

== Phase I ==
=== Group A ===
Pos	Team	Pld	W	D	L	GF	GA	GD	Pts	Qualification
1	Victoria Chișinău	15	11	1	3	46	17	+29	34	Phase II Group 1
2	Sheriff-2 Tiraspol (Note: Ineligible for Phase II Group 1)	15	10	2	3	38	10	+28	32	Phase II Group 2
3	Speranța Drochia	15	6	3	6	14	15	−1	21 (Note: Goal difference: Speranța : –1, Iskra : –8.)	Phase II Group 1
4	Iskra Rîbnița	15	6	3	6	24	32	−8	21	Phase II Group 2
5	FCM Ungheni	15	6	2	7	38	30	+8	20	Phase II Group 2
6	Dinamo-Auto	15	0	1	14	6	62	−56	1	Phase II Group 2

Source: FMF, Soccerway
Rules for classification: 1) Points; 2) Head-to-head points; 3) Head-to-head goal difference; 4) Head-to-head goals scored; 5) Matches won; 6) Goal difference; 7) Goals scored; 8) Least red cards; 9) Least yellow cards.

=== Results ===
Home \ Away	DIN	ISK	SHE	SPE	UNG	VIC	DIN	ISK	SHE	SPE	UNG	VIC
Dinamo-Auto	—	1–4	0–3	1–2	1–5	0–3	—	—	0–7	1–3	—	—
Iskra Rîbnița	1–0	—	1–1	2–1	3–2	0–2	6–1	—	—	—	3–1	—
Sheriff-2 Tiraspol	8–0	4–0	—	1–0	1–0	3–2	—	1–1	—	—	5–1	1–0
Speranța Drochia	0–0	1–0	0–2	—	2–1	1–3	—	0–0	1–0	—	—	2–1
FCM Ungheni	6–0	3–1	3–1	2–1	—	1–1	7–0	—	—	0–0	—	3–6
Victoria Chișinău	4–1	7–1	1–0	1–0	5–3	—	3–0 (Note: Dinamo-Auto was awarded a technical loss against Victoria due to their failure to appear at their round 14 match.)	7–1	—	—	—	—

Source: FMF (in Romanian)
Legend: Blue = home team win; Yellow = draw; Red = away team win.

=== Group B ===
Pos	Team	Pld	W	D	L	GF	GA	GD	Pts	Qualification
1	Saksan	15	10	5	0	44	14	+30	35	Phase II Group 1
2	Univer Comrat	15	10	3	2	33	18	+15	33	Phase II Group 1
3	Speranis Nisporeni	15	5	4	6	26	28	−2	19	Phase II Group 2
4	Fălești	15	5	2	8	24	32	−8	17 (Note: Head-to-head points: Fălești : 6, Olimp : 3.)	Phase II Group 2
5	Olimp Comrat	15	4	5	6	19	24	−5	17	Phase II Group 2
6	Real Succes	15	1	1	13	14	44	−30	4	Phase II Group 2

Source: FMF, Soccerway
Rules for classification: 1) Points; 2) Head-to-head points; 3) Head-to-head goal difference; 4) Head-to-head goals scored; 5) Matches won; 6) Goal difference; 7) Goals scored; 8) Least red cards; 9) Least yellow cards.

=== Results ===
Home \ Away	FĂL	OLI	REA	SAK	SPE	UNI	FĂL	OLI	REA	SAK	SPE	UNI
Fălești	—	2–1	1–0	1–2	0–0	1–2	—	0–1	2–5	4–7	—	—
Olimp Comrat	2–3	—	3–1	1–1	2–2	0–2	—	—	—	0–3	3–1	—
Real Succes	0–3	1–1	—	0–5	0–3	0–3	—	1–2	—	—	1–5	1–2
Saksan	2–0	1–1	4–2	—	0–0	1–1	—	—	6–0	—	5–0	—
Speranis Nisporeni	0–1	2–0	2–1	1–3	—	3–2	4–4	—	—	—	—	2–4
Univer Comrat	3–0	0–0	2–1	3–3	2–1	—	3–2	4–2	—	0–1	—	—

Source: FMF (in Romanian)
Legend: Blue = home team win; Yellow = draw; Red = away team win.

== Phase II ==
=== Group 1 ===
Pos	Team	Pld	W	D	L	GF	GA	GD	Pts	Promotion or qualification	FLO	VIC	SAK	SPA	UNI	SPE
1	Florești (C, P)	10	7	2	1	21	6	+15	23	Promotion to Super Liga		4–0	2–2	3–0	1–1	3–0
2	Victoria Chișinău (Note: Victoria and subsequently Saksan and Univer failed to obtain the necessary license to compete in the 2024–25 Super Liga season. As a consequence, Spartanii Sportul were promoted instead.) (O)	10	7	1	2	21	12	+9	22	Play-offs	1–0		1–2	4–1	4–1	5–1
3	Saksan	10	5	1	4	14	14	0	16	Play-offs	0–1	0–1		1–3	0–3	1–0
4	Spartanii Sportul (P)	10	4	1	5	14	19	−5	13	Play-offs	1–2	0–1	2–4		2–1	2–1
5	Univer Comrat	10	3	2	5	21	15	+6	11	Play-offs	1–2	2–3	1–2	1–1		7–0
6	Speranța Drochia	10	0	1	9	4	29	−25	1	Play-offs	0–3	1–1	0–2	1–2	0–3	

Source: FMF, Soccerway
Legend: Blue = home team win; Yellow = draw; Red = away team win.
Rules for classification: 1) Points; 2) Head-to-head points; 3) Head-to-head goal difference; 4) Head-to-head goals scored; 5) Matches won; 6) Goal difference; 7) Goals scored; 8) Least red cards; 9) Least yellow cards.
(C) Champions; (O) Play-off winners; (P) Promoted

=== Group 2 ===
Pos	Team	Pld	W	D	L	GF	GA	GD	Pts	Qualification or relegation	SHE	OLI	SPE	UNG	FĂL	ISK	REA	DIN
1	Sheriff-2 Tiraspol (Note: Ineligible for play-offs and relegation)	7	6	1	0	28	5	+23	19			3–1	—	6–1	9–0	3–0	—	—
2	Olimp Comrat	7	5	0	2	17	8	+9	15	Play-offs	—		2–1	3–0	—	3–1	4–1	—
3	Speranis Nisporeni	7	4	1	2	10	6	+4	13	Play-offs	0–1	—		—	1–0	—	—	3–0 (Note: Technical wins/losses)
4	FCM Ungheni	7	3	2	2	12	15	−3	11	Play-offs	—	—	2–2		—	2–1	2–1	3–0
5	Fălești	7	3	1	3	11	17	−6	10	Play-offs	—	2–1	—	2–2		—	3–2	—
6	Iskra Rîbnița	7	3	0	4	10	10	0	9	Play-offs	—	—	0–1	—	2–1		3–0	—
7	Real Succes (R)	7	1	1	5	11	17	−6	4	Liga 2	3–3	—	1–2	—	—	—		3–0
8	Dinamo-Auto	7	0	0	7	0	21	−21	0	withdrew (Note: Dinamo-Auto withdrew from the league after winter break. All remaining matches are awarded 0–3 against them.)	0–3	0–3	—	—	0–3	0–3	—	

Source: FMF, Soccerway
Legend: Blue = home team win; Yellow = draw; Red = away team win.
Rules for classification: 1) Points; 2) Head-to-head points; 3) Head-to-head goal difference; 4) Head-to-head goals scored; 5) Matches won; 6) Goal difference; 7) Goals scored; 8) Least red cards; 9) Least yellow cards.
(R) Relegated

== Promotion play-offs ==
=== Bracket ===
First round
4 May 2024
Speranis Nisporeni	3
FCM Ungheni	2
4 May 2024
Olimp Comrat	3
Fălești	0

Second round
11 May 2024
Victoria Chișinău	3
Speranis Nisporeni	0
11 May 2024
Univer Comrat	2
Speranța Drochia	1
11 May 2024
Saksan (a.e.t.) (p)	0 (5)
Olimp Comrat	0 (4)
11 May 2024
Spartanii Sportul	1
Iskra Rîbnița (a.e.t.)	2

Third round
17 May 2024
Victoria Chișinău	3
Univer Comrat	0
17 May 2024
Saksan	4
Iskra Rîbnița	0

Fourth round
23 May 2024
Victoria Chișinău	1
Saksan	0

=== First round ===
4 May 2024	Speranis Nisporeni	3–2	FCM Ungheni	Nisporeni
16:00 EEST	Crîcimari 22' (pen.); Danilov 69', 89'	Report	Șobraneschi 49'; Cojocaru 67'	Stadium: Mircea Eliade; Attendance: 150; Referee: Oleg Stoianov

4 May 2024	Olimp Comrat	3–0	Fălești	Comrat
16:00 EEST	Popovici 42'; Chirciu 60'; Decev 87'	Report		Stadium: Victor Mumjiev; Attendance: 150; Referee: Andrei Ceban

=== Second round ===
11 May 2024	Victoria Chișinău	3–0	Speranis Nisporeni	Chișinău
16:00 EEST	Molla 35'; Rusu 79'; Sandu 88'	Report		Stadium: Joma Arena; Attendance: 100; Referee: Andrei Diordiev

11 May 2024	Univer Comrat	2–1	Speranța Drochia	Comrat
16:00 EEST	Borovschi 43'; Covali 78'	Report	Gavriliță 49'	Stadium: Victor Mumjiev; Attendance: 100; Referee: Petru Stoianov

11 May 2024	Saksan	0–0 (a.e.t.) (5–4 p)	Olimp Comrat	Ceadîr-Lunga
16:00 EEST		Report		Stadium: Ceadîr-Lunga; Attendance: 300; Referee: Andrei Breguța
	Penalties
	Abba (penalty scored); David (penalty scored); Mocanu (penalty scored); Umar (penalty scored); Leu (penalty scored)		(penalty missed) Decev; (penalty scored) Popovici; (penalty scored) Diacenco; (penalty scored) Castro; (penalty scored) Ojog

11 May 2024	Spartanii Sportul	1–2 (a.e.t.)	Iskra Rîbnița	Chișinău
16:00 EEST	Țurcan 75'	Report	Gorodețchi 12'; Tuluc 92'	Stadium: Real Succes; Attendance: 50; Referee: Alexandru Stefciuc

=== Third round ===
17 May 2024	Victoria Chișinău	3–0	Univer Comrat	Chișinău
17:00 EEST	Blajchin 41'; Gurgurov 49'; Sofronovici 64'	Report		Stadium: Joma Arena; Attendance: 200; Referee: Alexandru Gîrneț

17 May 2024	Saksan	4–0	Iskra Rîbnița	Ceadîr-Lunga
17:00 EEST	Bamba 52', 87' (pen.); Abba 84' (pen.); Sprinsean 85'	Report		Stadium: Ceadîr-Lunga; Attendance: 200; Referee: Roman Jitari

=== Fourth round ===
23 May 2024	Victoria Chișinău	1–0	Saksan	Chișinău
17:00 EEST	Bînzaru 19'	Report		Stadium: Joma Arena; Attendance: 200; Referee: Andrei Cojocaru

== Top goalscorers ==
Rank	Player	Club	Goals
1	(Moldova) Eugen Sidorenco	FCM Ungheni	15
2	(Moldova) Florin Cojocaru	FCM Ungheni	13
2	(Ivory Coast) Lamah Bamba	Saksan	13
2	(Moldova) Veaceslav Cozma	Univer	13
5	(Moldova) Alexandru Popovici	Olimp (4) & Iskra (8)	12
6	(Moldova) Serghei Decev	Olimp	11
6	(Moldova) Oleg Molla	Victoria	11
8	(Ivory Coast) Rayan Guibero	Saksan	10
8	(Moldova) Nicolai Spatar	Sheriff-2	10
8	(Moldova) Ghenadie Orbu	Victoria	10
8	(Moldova) Adrian Rusu	Victoria (5) & Speranța (5)	10

== Clean sheets ==
Rank	Player	Club	Clean sheets
1	(Moldova) Cristian Leu	Saksan	11
2	(Moldova) Roman Dumenco	Sheriff-2	8
3	(Moldova) Artiom Cubani	Speranis	6
3	(Moldova) Victor Buga	Victoria	6
5	(Moldova) Ivan Marcov	Olimp	5
5	(Moldova) Maxim Bardîș	Florești	5
7	(Moldova) Anton Coval	Univer	4
7	(Moldova) Oleg Malac	Victoria	4
9	(Moldova) Victor Secrieru	FCM Ungheni	3
9	(Moldova) Dumitru Burac	Fălești	3
9	(Moldova) Anatolie Cebotari	Iskra	3
9	(Moldova) Serghei Obîscalov	Sheriff-2	3
9	(Moldova) Sergiu Nicolaev	Speranța	3

=== Discipline ===
==== Club ====
- Most yellow cards: 59
  - Univer
- Fewest yellow cards: 7
  - Florești
- Most red cards: 6
  - Saksan
- Fewest red cards: 0
  - Real Succes
  - Victoria
  - Dinamo-Auto
  - Florești
