= Constantin Sandu =

Moldovan footballer

Personal information
- Date of birth: 15 September 1993 (age 33)
- Place of birth: Chișinău, Moldova
- Height: 1.82 m (6 ft 0 in)
- Position: Forward

Youth career
- –2013: Budoni

Senior career*
Years	Team	Apps	(Gls)
2011–2013	Budoni	15	(1)
2014	Gladiator 1924	9	(0)
2014–2015	Academia Chișinău	2	(0)
2015–2016	Petrocub Hîncești	9	(1)
2016–2017	Saksan	25	(2)
2017	Speranța Nisporeni	16	(0)
2017–2018	Portici 1906	15	(0)
2018–2020	Speranța Nisporeni	44	(8)
2021–2024	Petrocub Hîncești	48	(5)
2024	Zimbru Chișinău	5	(0)
2024–2025	Petrocub Hîncești	4	(1)
2025	Dacia Buiucani	2	(0)
2025	ASA Târgu Mureș	2	(0)

International career
2018–2019	Moldova	7	(0)
- * Club domestic league appearances and goals as of 1 November 2025

Constantin Sandu (born 15 September 1993) is a Moldovan professional footballer who plays as a forward.

== Club career ==
On 21 January 2021, Sandu signed for Petrocub Hîncești, which he also played for between 2015 and 2016.

On 17 January 2024, Sandu signed for Zimbru Chișinău.

== International career ==
Sandu made his international debut for Moldova on 12 October 2018, coming on as a substitute in the 79th minute for Radu Gînsari in the 2018–19 UEFA Nations League D match against San Marino, which finished as a 2–0 home win.

== Career statistics ==
=== International ===
Appearances and goals by national team and year
National team	Year	Apps	Goals
Moldova	2018	3	0
Moldova	2019	4	0
Total		7	0

== Honours ==
Zimbru Chișinău

- Cupa Moldovei runner-up: 2023–24

Dacia Buiucani

- Moldovan Liga 1: 2024–25
