= FC Florești =

Association football club in Moldova

Florești
- Full name: Fotbal Club Florești
- Founded: 2003; 23 years ago
- Ground: Dinamo Stadium
- Capacity: 5,000
- 2025–26: Liga 1
Home colours	Away colours

Fotbal Club Florești is a Moldovan professional football club based in Florești.

== History ==
=== Early years (2003-2019) ===
Florești were founded in 2003. They played in the third tier until they were promoted in 2017 after finishing 5 points ahead of 2nd place CF Soroca. In 2019, they were promoted to the top division.

=== First years in Divizia Nationala (2019-2022) ===
In preparation for the first season in their first top-flight season, FC Floresti transferred 7 players and loaned 3 players: Alexandru Zveaghințev, Serghei Diulgher, Serghei Bobrov, Igor Bugaiov, Constantin Mandrîcenco, Dumitru Semirov, the experienced Ion Arabadji. Vladimir Covenco, Vladislav Liharev and Andrei Calac were loaned from Sheriff Tiraspol. In their opening Divizia Nationala game, Floresti played against the now defunct Dinamo-Auto, losing 3–1. Igor Bugaiov would score in the 79th minute for Floresti. The club's first ever win would come on 7 July 2020, against relegation favourites Codru Lozova, with the score of 1–0. The team would finish a respectable 7th place.

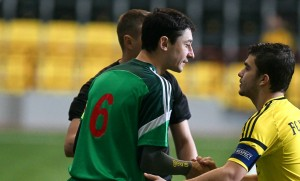
Igor Bugaiov, one of the transferred players in 2019

Floresti started weak in the next season. A narrow 1–0 loss with Petrocub, then a heavy loss, 0–4, with relegation opponent Zimbru. To add to the problems, Serghei Diulgher, the captain of the team, would leave the team, going to Iceland. There were also rumors of Match fixing plaguing the club. Shockingly, the club was expelled from the Divizia Nationala on 17 January 2021, after match-fixing allegations.

=== The 2022-23 Liga 1 season ===
Despite the scandals of last season, Alexandru Osipov would stay at the club. Nicolai Turcan would be installed as manager. The club started with 1–0 loss away at FCM Ungheni. Despite this, the club would Finnish first, 2 points above 2nd place FC Fălești. The play-offs would start off promising. A 0–0 with Super Liga club Dacia Buiucani would ignite hope for Turcan's men. The club would finish 2nd, 4 points behind Dacia Buiucani. That meant the club would traverse the playoffs. The club would win 2–0 against Văsieni, due to a brace in the final minutes by Oleg Bulat. Then came the semi-finals of the competition, where Floresti would play Victoria Bardar, seasoned Liga 1 experts, with players like Ghenadie Orbu, Oleg Molla and Petru Postoroncă, all of which played in the DN. The game would finish 3–3 after 120 minutes. Victoria would end up winning on penalties. Despite this, the club would promote into the Super Liga, despite not having the license, after Sfîntul Gheorghe would be dissolved.

=== Return to Super Liga (2023-2025) ===
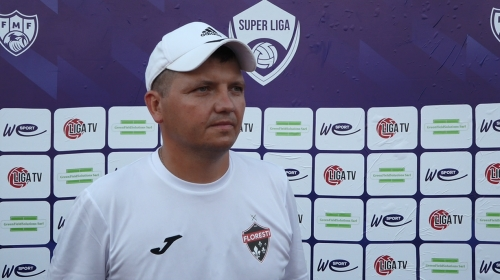
Nicolae Turcan, the manager of Floresti, taking questions after a match

The clubs logo.

In preparation for the season, Floresti transferred a handful of players, including Daniel Muntean and Nikita Holodov. The club debuted in the league with a categorical win, 4–0, against Spartanii. Nicolai Solodovnicov would score a brace. During the regular season, the club would duel Dacia Buiucani in the race to 6th. In round 6, the teams would draw 2–2 due to a Alexandru Suvorov free kick goal. In the 2nd confrontation Dacia Buiucani would win 2–1. The club would also be knocked out in the cup after a loss on penalties to Victoria. On the final match-day both teams were in the race for 6th place. All Dacia had to do was beat Zimbru. Floresti had to beat Milsami and hope Dacia does not win against Zimbru. Solodovnicov would score after a mistake in Milsami's defence to win 0–1. However Dacia would win 2–1 after goals by Ilie Botnari and Eugen Zasavițchi to seal the deal. However Floresti would win the playoffs and stay in the Super Liga.

The club started training for the 2024-25 season on the 24th of June. However, in the wake of serious financial problems, the club would lose a majority of their star players, such as Maxim Bardis, Berkat Yaylan, Nichita Picus, Nichita Covali, Alexandru Suvorov and Nicolai Solodovnicov. This would contribute to a very middling regular season. They debuted with a lucky 0-0 to a rejuvenated Spartanii Sportul, however things quickly took a turn for the worse. They would lose 8-0 twice, once to Zimbru Chisanau, the other time to Milsami. Things would devolve further after the club lost 3-0 by not being present to Petrocub. Following the incident, several prominent players, including Mihail Tipac would state the club was seriously delaying salaries or not even sending them. The situation prompted even more players to stop playing. By the end of the season, the club was last, with 0 goals scored and 59 against.

The relegation play-offs would ensue 2 months later. Despite manager Nicolae Turcan being optimistic in regards to the club's situation, it got worse. They started off with a 19-0 loss to FC Saksan, with Bogdan Musteata scoring 8 times. During the play-offs, they would only score thrice, and finish last once more, with -2 points, as they used an unlicenced player. They did not receive the Liga 1 license, only receiving the one for the third division. However, manages to win back the Liga 1 license after an appeal. The play-offs for to decide the 2nd team in the Super Liga started, with Floresti losing 2-0 a.e.t to Fălești, conforming the clubs relegation.

=== Current Liga 1 Season ===
The club has managed to rebound since. After luring back several prominent players such Alexandru Osipov, the club finished first in the regular season, paid off all of their debt, and look set for another season of top-flight football.

== Stadium ==
The club played their home matches at the Stadionul Izvoare in Florești before they were promoted to the top division, after which they played at the Dinamo Stadium in Bender.

== Honours ==
- Divizia A / Liga 1
  - Winners: 2019, 2023–24
- Divizia B
  - Winners: 2017

== League history ==
Season	League									Cup	Ref
Season	Tier	Pos	Pld	W	D	L	GF	GA	Pts	Cup	Ref
2017	3rd	↑ 1st	18	14	2	2	57	19	44	1st preliminary round	
2018	2nd	2nd	22	12	4	6	40	27	40	Round of 16	
2019	2nd	↑ 1st	28	22	3	3	71	29	69	Second round	
2020–21	1st	7th	36	9	5	22	37	85	32	Quarter-finals	
2021–22	1st	↓ 8th	28	0	0	28	12	88	−6 (Note: Florești were deducted 6 points in the 2021–22 season. They were also excluded from the league during the winter break, with the remaining nine fixtures awarded 0–3 against them.)	Quarter-finals	
2022–23	2nd	↑ 2nd	22	15	1	6	43	19	43	Round of 16	
2023–24	1st	7th	14	3	1	10	18	33	10	Round of 16	
2023–24	2nd	↑ 1st	10	7	2	1	21	6	23	Round of 16	
2024–25	1st	↓ 8th	14	0	1	13	0	59	1	Round of 16	
2024–25	2nd	6th	10	0	0	10	3	54	−3	Round of 16	
