= Teodor Lungu =

Moldovan footballer

Personal information
- Date of birth: 12 June 1995 (age 31)
- Place of birth: Ialoveni, Moldova
- Height: 1.80 m (5 ft 11 in)
- Position: Midfielder

Team information
- Current team: Oțelul Galați
- Number: 39

Youth career
- –2012: Fulger Ialoveni

Senior career*
| Years | Team | Apps | (Gls) |
| 2012–2018 | Sfîntul Gheorghe | 111 | (14) |
| 2018–2019 | Foresta Suceava | | |
| 2020 | Dacia Buiucani | 19 | (0) |
| 2021–2022 | Sfîntul Gheorghe | 33 | (2) |
| 2022 | Gardolo | | |
| 2023–2025 | Petrocub Hîncești | 68 | (7) |
| 2026 | Unirea Slobozia | 17 | (0) |
| 2026– | Oțelul Galați | 11 | (1) |

International career^{‡}
| 2024– | Moldova | 5 | (0) |
- * Club domestic league appearances and goals as of 25 October 2026 ‡ National team caps and goals as of 9 June 2026

Teodor Lungu (born 12 June 1995) is a Moldovan professional footballer who plays as a midfielder for Liga I club Oțelul Galați and the Moldova national team.

== Club career ==
Lungu made his debut for Sfîntul Gheorghe in the Divizia Națională in a 2–2 draw against Sheriff Tiraspol on 29 April 2018. He played four matches in the 2018 season, before transferring to Romanian Liga III side Foresta Suceava in August 2018. He left the club in November 2019. Ahead of the 2020–21 season, he returned to Moldova, joining Dacia Buiucani.

In January 2021, Lungu returned to Sfîntul Gheorghe, signing a two-year contract. In September 2022 he joined the Promozione club Gardolo. In January 2023 Lungu returned to Moldova, joining Petrocub Hîncești. He scored Petrocub's first goal in UEFA Conference League.

On 17 June 2026, the player moved to Oțelul Galați from Liga I, signing a two-year contract.

== International career ==
In March 2021, he was called up to the Moldova national team for the first time. He made his debut on 19 November 2024 in a friendly against Gibraltar.

== Career statistics ==
=== International ===
As of match played 9 June 2026

Appearances and goals by national team and year
| National team | Year | Apps | Goals |
|---|---|---|---|
Moldova
| Moldova | 2024 | 1 | 0 |
| Moldova | 2025 | 0 | 0 |
| Moldova | 2026 | 4 | 0 |
| Total | | 5 | 0 |

== Honours ==
Sfîntul Gheorghe

- Cupa Moldovei: 2020–21
- Supercupa Moldovei: 2021

Petrocub Hîncești

- Moldovan Super Liga: 2023–24
- Cupa Moldovei: 2023–24
