= Corneliu Cotogoi =

Moldovan footballer

Personal information
- Date of birth: 23 June 2001 (age 25)
- Place of birth: Chișinău, Moldova
- Height: 1.77 m (5 ft 10 in)
- Position: Midfielder

Team information
- Current team: Bălți
- Number: 71

Youth career
- –2020: Dacia Buiucani

Senior career*
Years	Team	Apps	(Gls)
2020–2021	Dacia Buiucani	34	(6)
2021–2024	Petrocub Hîncești	65	(4)
2024–2026	1599 Șelimbăr	25	(0)
2026–	Bălți	9	(0)

International career^{‡}
2019	Moldova U19	1	(0)
2021–2022	Moldova U21 (Note: Only official UEFA matches included)	4	(0)
2021–	Moldova	6	(0)
- * Club domestic league appearances and goals as of 1 June 2026 ‡ National team caps and goals as of 19 November 2024

Corneliu Cotogoi (born 23 June 2001) is a Moldovan professional footballer who plays as a midfielder for Moldovan Liga club Bălți.

== Club career ==
Cotogoi made his professional debut for Dacia Buiucani in the Moldovan National Division on 5 July 2020, starting against Zimbru Chișinău. The away match finished as a 1–0 win. In 2021 he joined Petrocub Hîncești with which he won the Moldovan Double in the 2023–2024 season. He scored 6 goals and assisted 6 in 89 appearances for the club. After his contract expired, Cotogoi joined the Liga II club Șelimbăr in September 2024.

== International career ==
Cotogoi made his international debut for Moldova on 31 March 2021 in a 2022 FIFA World Cup qualification match against Israel, which finished as a 4–1 home loss.

== Career statistics ==
=== International ===
As of 19 November 2024

Appearances and goals by national team and year
National team	Year	Apps	Goals
Moldova
Moldova	2021	3	0
Moldova	2022	2	0
Moldova	2024	1	0
Total		6	0

== Honours ==
Petrocub Hîncești

- Moldovan Super Liga: 2023–24
- Cupa Moldovei: 2023–24
