= David Abagna =

Ghanaian footballer (born 1998)

Personal information
- Full name: David Abagna Sandan
- Date of birth: 9 September 1998 (age 28)
- Place of birth: Accra, Ghana
- Height: 1.77 m (5 ft 10 in)
- Position: Midfielder

Team information
- Current team: Ordabasy
- Number: 77

Senior career*
Years	Team	Apps	(Gls)
2016–2018	Wa All Stars	45	(15)
2019–2021	Ashanti Gold	41	(9)
2021–2023	Real Tamale United	24	(12)
2023–2024	Al-Hilal Club	4	(1)
2024	→ Petrocub Hincesti (loan)	10	(4)
2024–2026	APOEL	32	(3)
2026–	Ordabasy	24	(3)

International career
2022–2023	Ghana	7	(0)
- * Club domestic league appearances and goals as of 13:29, 31 October 2026 (UTC)

David Abagna Sandan (born 9 September 1998) is a Ghanaian professional footballer who plays as a midfielder for Kazakhstan Premier League club Ordabasy. He previously played for Ghana Premier League sides Ashanti Gold, Wa All stars and Real Tamale United. He won his first league title in his debut season with Wa All Stars in 2016.

== Career ==
=== Early life and career ===
Abagna was born in Tamale in the Northern Region of Ghana. He started his career with Tamale based team Zaytuna Babies. He later moved to Wa All Stars FC in 2016 ahead of the 2016 Ghana premier league season.

=== Wa All stars ===
==== 2016 season ====
Abagna moved from Zaytuna in 2016 to then Ghana Premier League team Wa All stars now Legon Cities. He won the league in his debut season and was a member of the squad that won the 2016 Ghanaian Premier League. He made his debut that season on 13 August 2018 against Ebusua Dwarfs being named on the starting line up for the match. He played 57 minutes and was later substituted for Samuel Atta Mensah. The match ended in a 1–0 home loss. He was named on 6 team sheets but made 4 appearances within the season as the club won the league title.

==== 2017 season ====
In the 2017 season, Abagna made all 30 league appearances and scored 13 goals, making him joint 3rd top goalscorer along with Thomas Abbey of Accra Hearts of Oak and Ahmed Touré of Bechem United F.C., trailing by 4 goals to the top scorer Hans Kwofie of Ashanti Gold. He also featured in the 2017 CAF Champions League for the club. He also played a crucial role during the 2017 Ghana FA Cup by scoring 4 goals as his side reached the semi-finals before losing to Hearts of Oak. In January 2018, he was nominated for the 2017 SWAG Most Promising Star of the Year. In May 2018, he beats off competition from Ghanaian weightlifter Richmond Osafo to win the award.

==== 2018 season ====
In the 2018 season, he made nine league appearances and scored two goals before the league was abandoned due to the dissolution of the GFA in June 2018, as a result of the Anas Number 12 Expose. By the time he left the club, he had made 45 league appearances and scored 15 goals.

=== Ashanti Gold ===
In July 2019, he was signed by Ashanti Gold on a three-year contract ahead of the 2019–20 Ghana Premier League. He made 11 league appearances before the league was abandoned and later cancelled due to the COVID-19 pandemic. He featured for the Obuasi-based club in the 2020–21 CAF Confederation Cup qualifying rounds match against Burkinabe club Salitas FC. He scored a goal in the second leg of the match but Ashanti Gold lost 2–1. He scored a brace in the 2020–21 Ghana Premier League on 19 February 2021, in a match against Aduana Stars, which eventually ended in a 4–0 win. Abagna played the 120 minutes of play in the FA Cup final at Accra Sports Stadium, but failed to convert his penalty in the eventual shootout loss.

=== Real Tamale United ===
In 2021, Abagna signed for childhood and hometown team Real Tamale United on a three-year deal with Ashanti Kotoko losing on securing his signature after they wrote to Ashanti Gold to express their interest in him. He started his career for the Tamale-based club on a high flying note, scoring five goals in his first three games. In the team's first premier league in seven years Abagna scored at home to help RTU draw 1–1 with Accra Great Olympics. He scored a brace in a 3–2 defeat away to Legon Cities FC before scoring another two goals on 14 November 2021, home encounter to help RTU clinch their first win against West Africa Football Academy (WAFA).

On Sunday, 5 December 2021, Abagna scored in stoppage time to give RTU a victory away from home against Berekum Chelsea at the Golden City Park in Berekum. Before departing for the Africa Cup of Nations in Cameroon, he scored 8 goals for RTU. In January 2023, Sudanese side Al Hilal completed the signing of Abagna on a four-year deal. Abagna's career was cut short, few months into his stay at Al Hilal following the advent of a civil war. The player returned home to Ghana and in March 2024, joined Moldovan side Petroclub on loan from Al Hilal. In ten league appearances, Abagna scored four goals for Petroclub. He helped the team to a domestic double winning both the league and the cup.

=== APOEL ===
In August 2024, APOEL in Cyprus announced that Abagna had signed a three-year deal with the club from Al-Hilal Club. On 7 November 2024, Abagna scored APOEL's second goal in a 2–1 victory over Fiorentina in the UEFA Conference League.

== International career ==
In July 2017, at the age of 17 years, Abagna received a late call up into the Ghana A' national football team, ahead of the 2018 CHAN qualifiers.

== Education ==
In 2018, Abagna enrolled in the University for Development Studies, to pursue a diploma in Education.

== Career statistics ==
=== International ===
Appearances and goals by national team and year
National team	Year	Apps	Goals
Ghana
Ghana	2022	4	0
Ghana	2023	3	0
Total		7	0

== Honours ==
Wa All Stars

- Ghana Premier League: 2016
- Ghana Super Cup: 2017

Petrocub Hîncești

- Moldovan Super Liga: 2023–24
- Moldovan Cup 2023–24

APOEL

- Cypriot Super Cup: 2024

Ordabasy

- Kazakhstan Premier League: 2026
- Kazakhstan Cup: 2026

Individual

- SWAG Most Promising Star of the Year: 2017
- Ghana FA Cup Most Promising Player: 2017
