= 2023–24 Moldovan Super Liga =

Super Liga
- Season: 2023–24
- Dates: 5 August 2023 – 18 May 2024
- Champions: Petrocub; 1st title
- Champions League: Petrocub
- Europa League: Sheriff
- Conference League: Zimbru; Milsami
- Matches: 86
- Goals: 254 (2.95 per match)
- Top goalscorer: Radu Gînsari (13 goals)
- Best goalkeeper: Silviu Șmalenea (9 clean sheets)

The 2023–24 Super Liga was the 33rd season of top-tier football in Moldova. The league started on 5 August 2023 and ended on 18 May 2024. Sheriff Tiraspol were the defending champions for the eighth consecutive season. The winners of the league this season earned a spot in the first qualifying round of the 2024–25 UEFA Champions League, the second placed club earned a spot in the first qualifying round of the 2024–25 UEFA Europa League, the third placed club earned a spot in the second qualifying round and the fourth placed club in the first qualifying round of the 2024–25 UEFA Conference League.

== Teams ==
A total of 8 teams competed in the league. 6 teams from the 2022–23 season and two promoted teams from the Liga 1: Florești, returning to the top tier after one-year absence and Spartanii Sportul, who played their first season in the top division.

=== Stadiums and locations ===
Bălți	Dacia Buiucani (Note: Dacia Buiucani are playing their home matches at the Zimbru-2 Stadium in Chișinău, instead of their stadium, the Joma Arena in Chișinău, which did not meet requirements.)	Florești (Note: Florești are playing their home matches in Bender, instead of their stadium in Florești, which did not meet requirements.)	Milsami
Bălți Stadium	Zimbru-2 Stadium (Note: Joma Arena used as home ground in round 13 (Phase I) and in round 2 (Phase II).)	Bender Stadium (Note: Sheriff Indoor Arena used as home ground in round 14 (Phase I).); UEFA	District Complex; UEFA
Capacity: 5,200	Capacity: 2,000	Capacity: 4,981	Capacity: 3,000
Petrocub	2023–24 Moldovan Super Liga is located in Moldova		Sheriff
Hîncești Stadium	2023–24 Moldovan Super Liga is located in Moldova		Sheriff small Arena (Note: Sheriff Indoor Arena used as home ground in round 1 (Phase II) and in round 2 (Phase II).); UEFA
Capacity: 1,100	2023–24 Moldovan Super Liga is located in Moldova		Capacity: 9,181
Spartanii Sportul (Note: Spartanii Sportul are playing their home matches in Suruceni, instead of their stadium in Selemet, which did not meet requirements.)	2023–24 Moldovan Super Liga is located in Moldova		Zimbru
Suruceni Stadium (Note: Joma Arena used as home ground in round 14 (Phase I).)	2023–24 Moldovan Super Liga is located in Moldova		Zimbru Stadium (Note: CPTF Stadium used as home ground in round 14 (Phase I).); UEFA
Capacity: 350	2023–24 Moldovan Super Liga is located in Moldova		Capacity: 10,104

=== Personnel and kits ===
Note: Flags indicate national team as has been defined under FIFA eligibility rules. Players and managers may hold more than one non-FIFA nationality.

Team	Head coach	Captain	Kit maker	Shirt sponsor
Sheriff	(Ukraine) Roman Pylypchuk (Note: Roberto Bordin (matches 1–7), Victor Mihailov (match 8), Roman Pylypchuk (matches 9–16), Victor Mihailov (matches 17–22), Yuriy Hura (matches 23–24).)	(Brazil) Ricardinho (Note: Ricardinho started the match as captain eleven times, Amine Talal seven times, Moussa Kyabou four times, Maksym Koval once, and Henrique Luvannor once.)	Adidas	none
Petrocub	(Moldova) Andrei Martin (Note: Ivan Tabanov (match 1), Andrei Martin (matches 2–24).)	(Moldova) Vladimir Ambros (Note: Vladimir Ambros started the match as captain nineteen times, and Ion Jardan five times.)	Puma	none
Milsami	(Moldova) Vladimir Gudev	(Moldova) Vadim Bolohan (Note: Vadim Bolohan started the match as captain twenty-three times, and Radu Gînsari once.)	Macron	none
Zimbru	(Moldova) Lilian Popescu	(Moldova) Ștefan Burghiu (Note: Ștefan Burghiu started the match as captain fourteen times, Alexandru Dedov five times, Denys Dedechko four times, and Nicolae Cebotari once.)	Macron	Chateau Vartely, A.M.G, apă pură
Bălți	(Moldova) Veaceslav Rusnac (Note: Alexandr Patraman (matches 1–3) (Note: Veaceslav Rusnac was serving a three match suspension and the assistant coach led the team.), Veaceslav Rusnac (matches 4–20), Alexandr Patraman (matches 21–23) (Note: Veaceslav Rusnac was serving a three match suspension and the assistant coach led the team.), Veaceslav Rusnac (match 24).)	(Moldova) Ruslan Chelari (Note: Ruslan Chelari started the match as captain seventeen times, and Stanislav Namașco seven times.)	Joma	Bălți, Floris
Dacia Buiucani	(Moldova) Viorel Frunză (Note: Andrei Martin (match 1), Andrei Vicolaș (match 2) (Note: Andrei Martin left his position before the match and the assistant coach led the team.), Viorel Frunză (matches 3–24).)	(Moldova) Eugen Zasavițchi (Note: Eugen Zasavițchi started the match as captain eighteen times, Ștefan Efros five times, and Mihail Țîpac once.)	Joma	Chișinău, Art Sport, OM, BP
Florești	(Moldova) Nicolai Țurcan (Note: Nicolai Țurcan (matches 1–12), Igor Ursachi (matches 13–14).)	(Moldova) Maxim Mihaliov (Note: Maxim Mihaliov started the match as captain six times, Ivan Voropai three times, Alexandru Suvorov twice, Vadim Cemîrtan once, Vladimir Covcenco once, and Artiom Bilinschii once.)	Joma	none
Spartanii Sportul	(Moldova) Vlad Goian (Note: Vlad Goian (matches 1–8), Viorel Cojocaru (matches 9–14) (Note: Viorel Cojocaru does not hold UEFA Pro Licence and led the team as an assistant coach.).)	(Moldova) Roman Șumchin (Note: Roman Șumchin started the match as captain eight times, Igor Arhirii three times, Victor Buga once, Alexei Ciopa once, and Victor Beșeti once.)	Joma	none

== Phase I ==
Pos	Team	Pld	W	D	L	GF	GA	GD	Pts	Qualification or relegation
1	Sheriff Tiraspol	14	11	1	2	35	7	+28	34	Qualification to Phase II
2	Petrocub Hîncești	14	8	4	2	29	7	+22	28 (Note: Head-to-head points: Petrocub : 4, Milsami : 1.)	Qualification to Phase II
3	Milsami Orhei	14	9	1	4	20	14	+6	28	Qualification to Phase II
4	Zimbru Chișinău	14	8	1	5	17	11	+6	25	Qualification to Phase II
5	Bălți	14	7	1	6	26	22	+4	22	Qualification to Phase II
6	Dacia Buiucani	14	3	3	8	14	32	−18	12	Qualification to Phase II
7	Florești	14	3	1	10	18	33	−15	10	Relegation to Liga 1 Phase II
8	Spartanii Sportul	14	0	2	12	9	42	−33	2	Relegation to Liga 1 Phase II

Source: FMF, UEFA, Soccerway
Rules for classification: 1) Points; 2) Head-to-head points; 3) Head-to-head goal difference; 4) Head-to-head goals scored; 5) Matches won; 6) Goal difference; 7) Goals scored; 8) Least red cards; 9) Least yellow cards.

=== Results ===
For matches 1–14, each team plays every other team twice (once home, once away).

Home \ Away	BĂL	DAC	FLO	MIL	PET	SHE	SPA	ZIM
Bălți	—	3–0	2–1	3–0	0–4	3–1	1–1	0–1
Dacia Buiucani	1–5	—	2–1	1–2	0–1	0–4	1–1	1–3
Florești	2–3	2–2	—	1–0	0–1	0–4	4–0	1–2
Milsami Orhei	2–1	3–0	2–1	—	1–1	2–0	3–1	1–0
Petrocub Hîncești	3–0	0–0	6–0	2–0	—	0–1	3–2	0–2
Sheriff Tiraspol	4–0	5–0	5–1	2–1	0–0	—	4–0	2–0
Spartanii Sportul	1–5	1–4	1–3	1–2	0–7	0–2	—	0–1
Zimbru Chișinău	1–0	1–2	3–1	0–1	1–1	0–1	2–0	—

Source: FMF, Soccerway
Legend: Blue = home team win; Yellow = draw; Red = away team win.

== Phase II ==
Pos	Team	Pld	W	D	L	GF	GA	GD	Pts	Qualification
1	Petrocub Hîncești (C)	10	7	3	0	30	5	+25	24	Qualification for the Champions League first qualifying round
2	Sheriff Tiraspol	10	5	3	2	16	9	+7	18	Qualification for the Europa League first qualifying round
3	Zimbru Chișinău	10	5	2	3	16	12	+4	17	Qualification for the Conference League second qualifying round
4	Milsami Orhei	10	2	4	4	11	12	−1	10	Qualification for the Conference League first qualifying round
5	Bălți	10	2	2	6	7	22	−15	8	
6	Dacia Buiucani	10	0	4	6	6	26	−20	4	

Source: FMF, UEFA, Soccerway
Rules for classification: 1) Points; 2) Play-off (only if deciding champion when two teams tied); 3) Head-to-head points; 4) Head-to-head goal difference; 5) Head-to-head goals scored; 6) Matches won; 7) Goal difference; 8) Goals scored; 9) Least red cards; 10) Least yellow cards.
(C) Champions

=== Results ===
For matches 1–10, each team plays every other team twice. Sheriff will play (7 at home and 3 away), Petrocub (6 at home and 4 away), Milsami and Zimbru (5 at home and 5 away), Bălți (4 at home and 6 away), Dacia Buiucani (3 at home and 7 away).

Home \ Away	SHE	PET	MIL	ZIM	BĂL	DAC	SHE	PET	MIL	ZIM	BĂL	DAC
Sheriff Tiraspol	—	1–1	2–1	4–1	2–0	1–1	—	—	—	—	2–1	3–0
Petrocub Hîncești	2–1	—	3–0	4–1	5–0	3–0	—	—	—	—	—	7–0
Milsami Orhei	0–0	1–1	—	0–0	3–0	1–1	—	—	—	—	—	—
Zimbru Chișinău	2–0	1–1	3–1	—	3–0	2–0	—	—	—	—	—	—
Bălți	—	0–3	1–0	2–1	—	2–2	—	—	—	—	—	—
Dacia Buiucani	—	—	1–4	0–2	1–1	—	—	—	—	—	—	—

Source: FMF, Soccerway
Legend: Blue = home team win; Yellow = draw; Red = away team win.

== Season statistics ==
=== Top goalscorers ===
Rank	Player	Club	Goals
1	(Moldova) Radu Gînsari	Milsami	13
2	(Moldova) Vladimir Ambros	Petrocub	10
2	(Moldova) Mihai Plătică	Petrocub	10
4	(Morocco) Amine Talal	Sheriff	8
5	(Brazil) Henrique Luvannor	Sheriff	7
5	(Moldova) Nicolai Solodovnicov	Florești	7
5	(Cape Verde) João Paulino	Zimbru	7
5	(Moldova) Nicky Cleșcenco	Petrocub	7
5	(Burkina Faso) Cedric Badolo	Sheriff	7
5	(Nigeria) Emmanuel Alaribe	Zimbru	7

=== Clean sheets ===
Rank	Player	Club	Clean sheets
1	(Moldova) Silviu Șmalenea	Petrocub	9
2	(Moldova) Nicolae Cebotari	Zimbru	8
3	(Moldova) Emil Tîmbur	Milsami	7
4	(Ghana) Razak Abalora	Petrocub (5) & Sheriff (1)	6
4	(Croatia) Toni Silić	Sheriff	6
6	(Ukraine) Maksym Koval	Sheriff	4
7	(Moldova) Stanislav Namașco	Bălți	3
8	(Moldova) Igor Mostovei	Zimbru	2
8	(Moldova) Maxim Bardîș	Florești	2
10	(Moldova) Victor Străistari	Sheriff	1
10	(Moldova) Victor Dodon	Dacia Buiucani	1

=== Discipline ===
==== Player ====
- Most yellow cards: 7
  - (Moldova) Igor Lambarschi (Milsami)
  - (Moldova) Daniel Lisu (Milsami)
  - (Moldova) Dumitru Bivol (Dacia Buiucani)
- Most red cards: 2
  - (Moldova) Vadim Paireli (Milsami)
  - (Moldova) Ștefan Efros (Dacia Buiucani)

==== Club ====
- Most yellow cards: 55
  - Milsami
- Fewest yellow cards: 28
  - Spartanii Sportul
- Most red cards: 4
  - Milsami
- Fewest red cards: 0
  - Florești
  - Sheriff
  - Spartanii Sportul
