= ArtSport Arena =

Football stadium in Chișinău, Moldova

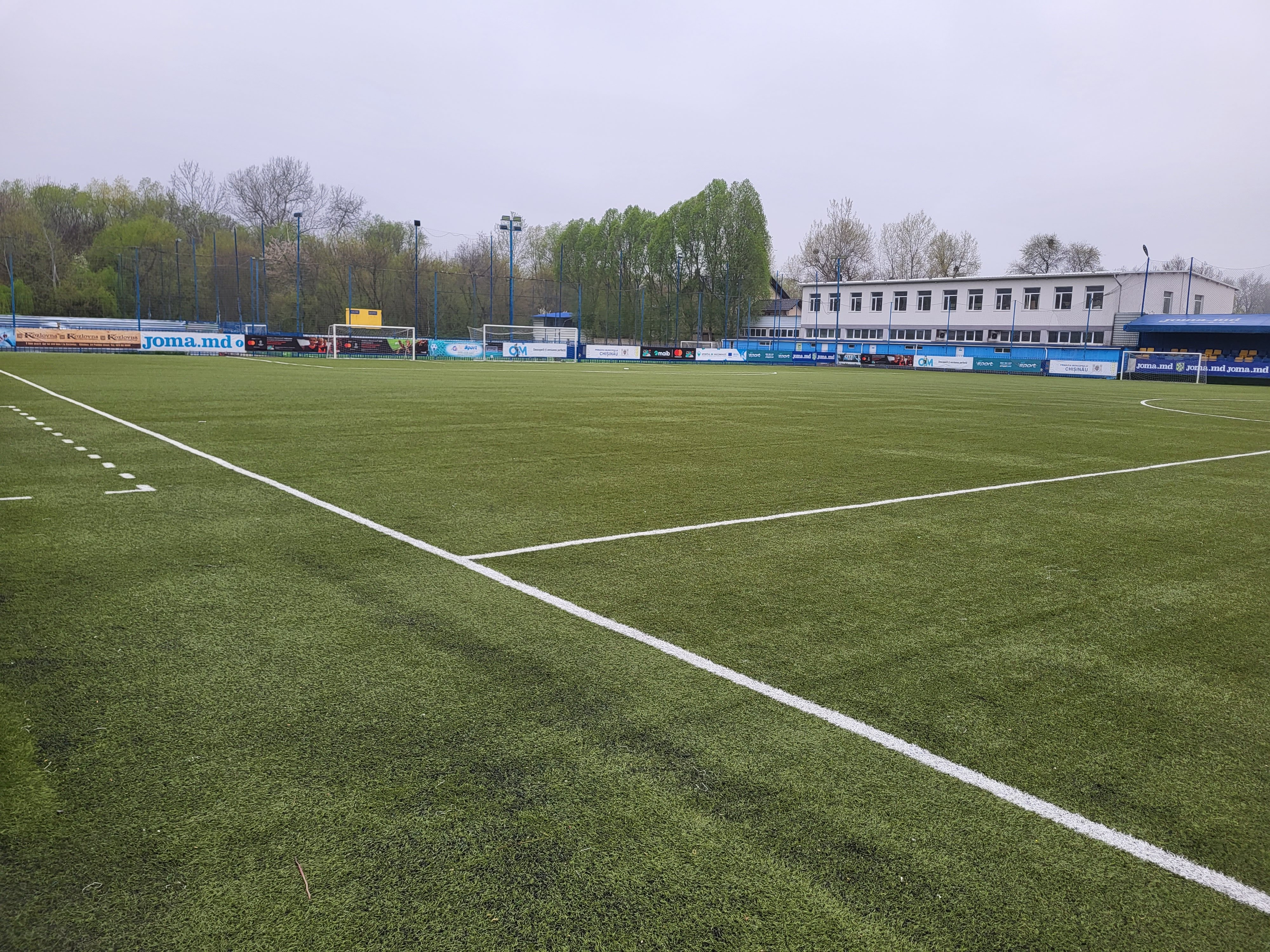
- The arena in 2023
- Interactive map of ArtSport Arena
- Address: 1/2 Ghidighici Street; Chișinău; Moldova
- Coordinates: 47.0476°N 28.7825°E
- Capacity: 2000
- Surface: Artificial turf
- Field size: 105m x 65m

Construction
- Groundbreaking: 1998
- Renovated: 2014
- Expanded: 2014

Tenants
- Dacia Buiucani; Victoria Chișinău

The ArtSport Arena (formerly known as CSCT Buiucani Stadium and between 2016 and 2026 as Joma Arena) is a multi-use stadium in Buiucani, Chișinău, Moldova. It is used mostly for football matches and is the home ground of Dacia Buiucani. The stadium holds 2,000 people. The stadium hosted many games of Moldovan National Division especially during snowy part of the season.

== History ==
ArtSport Arena is part of the football complex of CSCT Buiucani - a sports club for children and youth located in Chișinău, Moldova founded on September 25, 1997. The current president of the club is Constantin Anghel.

The arena boasts several synthetic pitches, changing rooms, showers, and a meeting room. In 1998, the Chișinău City Hall, with the support of the Pretura of the Buiucani sector, offered the land for the sports complex.

In 2000, CSCT Buiucani became the first football club in the Republic of Moldova to have a football field with artificial turf of standard size, installed by the Moldovan Football Federation.

CSCT Buiucani's youth academy has trained approximately 500 children and juniors, starting from the age of 5. The club employs more than 20 qualified trainers at the center.

In recognition of its achievements, the UEFA Executive Committee designated CSCT Buiucani as the best mass football club in Europe in 2012.

Notable players who began their football careers at CSCT Buiucani include Victor Golovatenco, Radu Gînsari, Cătălin Carp, Nicolae Milinceanu, Lado Akhalaia, Alexei Koșelev, Dumitru Celeadnic, Eugeniu Cociuc, Dorian Răilean, Vasile Jardan, Iaser Țurcan, Dan Pîslă, Ghenadie Moșneaga, Marius Iosipoi, Corneliu Cotogoi, and many others.

In 2018, the club created a new team called Dacia Buiucani, which quickly achieved success. In its first year, Dacia Buiucani ranked second in Division B, Center series, and got promoted to Division A. In the 2019/20 season, the team, coached by Andrei Martin, finished second in Division A and promoted to the National Division. In its debut season in the elite of Moldovan football, Dacia Buiucani earned an honorable 5th place among 10 teams. Due to economic reasons, the club management decided to participate in Division A for the 2021/22 edition. Nevertheless, Dacia Buiucani returned to the Super League in seasons 2022-2023.

== Usage ==
ArtSport Arena has been used for many seasons for matches in Divizia Națională. Starting with 2012 the arena hosted most of the home games of teams from Chișinău and surrounding area. Costuleni, Sfîntul Gheorghe, Rapid Ghidighici played most of the games here. Some home games of Speranţa Crihana Veche, Academia UTM were also performed on this pitch. Zimbru and Ungheni used it for some games as well.

Since 2022 it mostly features home games of Victoria Chișinău in Moldovan Liga 1.
