= Dorian Railean =

Moldovan footballer

Personal information
- Date of birth: 13 October 1993 (age 33)
- Place of birth: Chișinău, Moldova
- Height: 1.85 m (6 ft 1 in)
- Position: Goalkeeper

Youth career
- –2010: Dacia Buiucani

Senior career*
Years	Team	Apps	(Gls)
2010–2013	Dacia Buiucani		
2010–2011	→ FC Tiraspol (loan)	1	(0)
2012–2012	→ Sfântul Gheorghe (loan)	3	(0)
2013–2017	Dacia Chișinău	52	(0)
2017–2018	Sfântul Gheorghe	38	(0)
2019	Petrocub Hîncești	15	(0)
2020–2021	Comuna Recea	18	(0)
2021–2023	Unirea Dej	46	(0)
2023–2024	Chindia Târgoviște	14	(0)
2024	Dinamo București	0	(0)
2024–2025	Gloria Buzău	5	(0)
2025–2026	CSM Olimpia Satu Mare	17	(0)

International career^{‡}
2011	Moldova U19	2	(0)
2012	Moldova U21	1	(0)
2019–	Moldova	18	(0)
- * Club domestic league appearances and goals as of 9 May 2026 ‡ National team caps and goals as of 19 November 2024

Dorian Railean (born 13 October 1993) is a Moldovan professional footballer who plays as a goalkeeper.

== International stats ==
As of match played 19 November 2024

Appearances and goals by national team and year
National team	Year	Apps	Goals
Moldova	2019	1	0
Moldova	2020	0	0
Moldova	2021	0	0
Moldova	2022	5	0
Moldova	2023	10	0
Moldova	2024	2	0
Total		18	0

== Honours ==
Dacia Chișinău

- Cupa Moldovei runner-up: 2014–15
- Divizia Națională runner-up: 2014–15, 2015–16, 2016–17

Comuna Recea

- Liga III: 2019–20
