= Andrei Martin =

Moldovan football manager

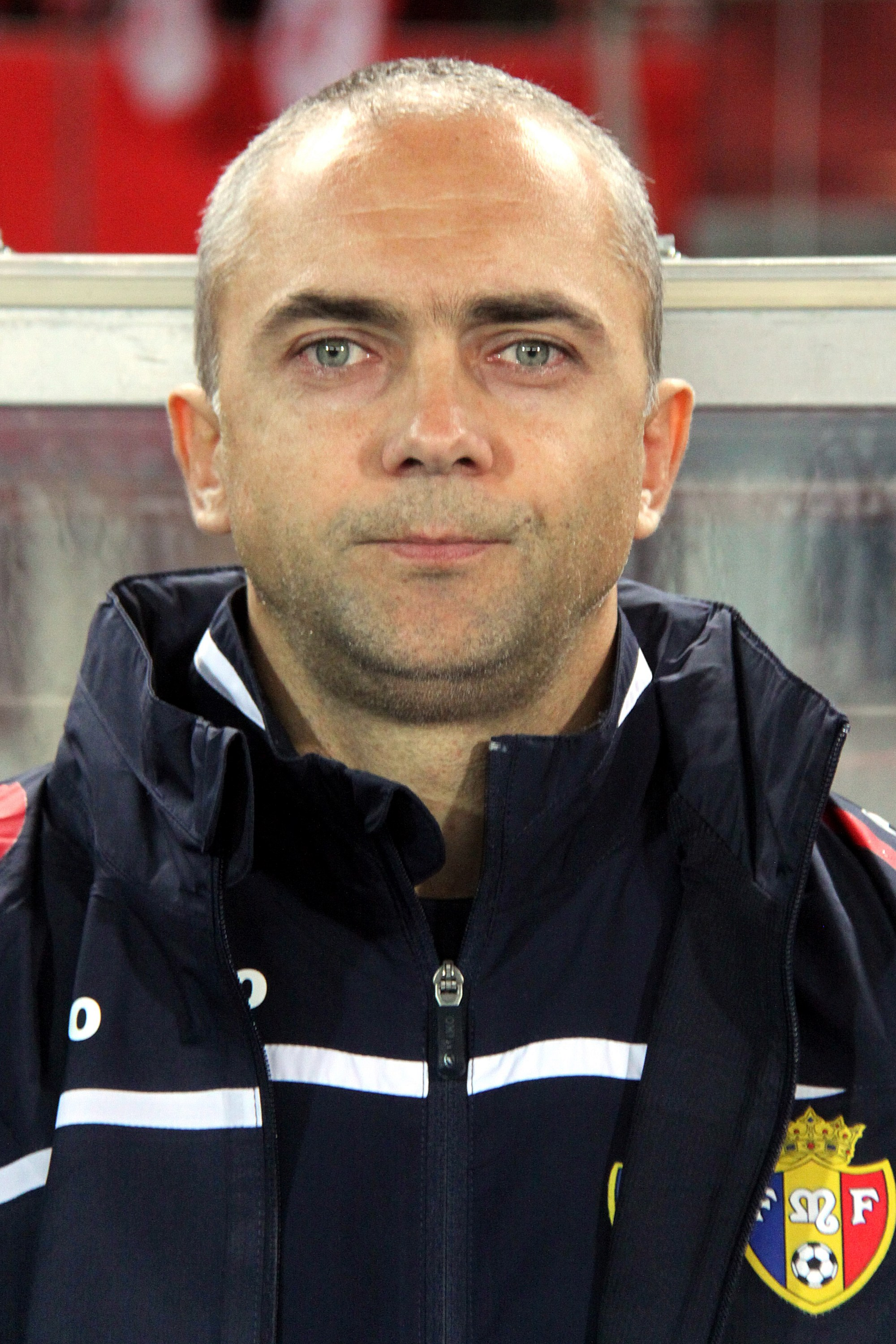
- Martin with Moldova in 2015

Personal information
- Date of birth: 27 June 1974 (age 52)
- Place of birth: Chișinău, Moldavian SSR, Soviet Union
- Height: 1.75 m (5 ft 9 in)
- Positions: Midfielder; defender

Team information
- Current team: Ordabasy (manager)

Senior career*
Years	Team	Apps	(Gls)
1992–1993	Universul Ciuciuleni	3	(1)
1994–1996	Spumante Cricova	27	(5)
1996	Constructorul Chișinău	1	(0)
1996	Moldova-Gaz Chișinău		
1996–1997	Spumante Cricova	16	(1)
1997	Stimold-MIF Chișinău	7	(1)
1997–2000	Moldova-Gaz Chișinău	53	(2)
2000	Agro Chișinău	7	(0)
2002–2005	Dacia Chișinău	72	(9)
2005	Zhetysu	9	(1)
2005–2009	Dacia Chișinău	69	(15)
2007	→ Iskra-Stali Rîbnița (loan)	12	(0)
2009–2011	Sfântul Gheorghe Suruceni	29	(1)
Total		305	(36)

Managerial career
- 2009–2010: Sfântul Gheorghe Suruceni
- 2011–2012: Dacia-2 Buiucani (assistant)
- 2012: Dacia Chișinău (assistant)
- 2013: Mordovia Saransk (assistant)
- 2013: Kuban Krasnodar (assistant)
- 2014: Qäbälä (assistant)
- 2015: Astra Giurgiu (assistant)
- 2015: Moldova (assistant)
- 2018–2019: Moldova (assistant)
- 2019–2023: Dacia Buiucani
- 2019–2020: Moldova (assistant)
- 2023–2024: Petrocub Hîncești
- 2024–: Ordabasy
- * Club domestic league appearances and goals

Andrei Martin (born 27 June 1974) is a Moldovan professional football manager and former player who is the manager of Kazakhstan Premier League club Ordabasy.

== Career ==
He has played in the Moldovan National Division from the early 1990s until 2011, for multiple clubs, most notably Dacia Chișinău.

Previously he worked as the assistant manager of Dorinel Munteanu at Romanian club Astra Giurgiu (March–April 2015), Azeri club FK Qäbälä (June–December 2014) and Russian clubs Kuban Krasnodar (July–October 2013), and Mordovia Saransk (January–June 2013).

Andrei Martin holds a UEFA PRO Manager Licence.

He has been an assistant coach for the Moldova national team on three occasions.

== Honours ==
Dacia Buiucani

- Liga 1: 2022–23

Petrocub Hîncești

- Super Liga: 2023–24

Ordabasy

- Kazakhstan Premier League: 2026
- Kazakhstan Cup: 2026
