= Dan Pușcaș =

Moldovan footballer (born 2001)

Personal information
- Date of birth: 1 June 2001 (age 25)
- Place of birth: Dubăsari, Moldova
- Height: 1.75 m (5 ft 9 in)
- Position: Midfielder

Team information
- Current team: Petrocub Hîncești
- Number: 37

Youth career
- –2020: Real Succes

Senior career*
| Years | Team | Apps | (Gls) |
| 2020–2021 | Dinamo-Auto Tiraspol | 41 | (4) |
| 2022–2023 | Sfîntul Gheorghe | 28 | (1) |
| 2023– | Petrocub Hîncești | 82 | (14) |

International career^{‡}
| 2018–2019 | Moldova U19 (Note: Only official UEFA matches included) | 6 | (0) |
| 2021 | Moldova U21 | 9 | (0) |
| 2024– | Moldova | 6 | (0) |
- * Club domestic league appearances and goals as of 24 October 2026 ‡ National team caps and goals as of 9 June 2026

Dan Pușcaș (born 1 June 2001) is a Moldovan professional footballer who plays as a midfielder for Moldovan Liga club Petrocub Hîncești and the Moldova national team.

== Club career ==
Pușcaș has played for Real Succes Chișinău until the summer of 2020, before signing for Dinamo-Auto Tiraspol. He left the team in December 2021, when his contract expired. In February 2022 he joined Sfîntul Gheorghe, reaching the final of Moldovan Cup in the same year. He scored only one goal for the team, against his former club Dinamo-Auto in a Moldovan Super Liga match. In July 2023 he joined Petrocub Hîncești, winning the Moldovan Double in his first season with the club.

== International career ==
Pușcaș was part of Moldova U19 squad in the "Roma Caput Mundi" tournament which took place in Italy in February 2019. He also played in 2019 and 2020 Euro U19 qualification. He played for Moldova U21 at 2023 Euro U21 qualification. On 10 September 2024 Pușcaș made his debut for the Moldova national football team in a friendly against San Marino.

== Honours ==
Sfîntul Gheorghe

- Moldovan Cup runner-up: 2021–22

Petrocub Hîncești

- Moldovan Super Liga: 2023–24, 2025–26
- Moldovan Cup: 2023–24
