= Marius Iosipoi =

Moldovan football player

Personal information
- Date of birth: 28 April 2000 (age 26)
- Place of birth: Ialoveni, Moldova
- Height: 1.83 m (6 ft 0 in)
- Position: Midfielder

Team information
- Current team: Petrocub Hîncești
- Number: 7

Youth career
- –2017: CSCT Buiucani
- 2017–2018: Politehnica Iași

Senior career*
Years	Team	Apps	(Gls)
2018–2019	Politehnica Iași	0	(0)
2020–2021	Dacia Buiucani	19	(1)
2021	→ Veles Moscow (loan)	7	(0)
2021–2024	Petrocub Hîncești	56	(11)
2024–2025	SKA-Khabarovsk	8	(0)
2025–2026	Milsami Orhei	25	(3)
2026–	Petrocub Hîncești	0	(0)

International career^{‡}
2020–2022	Moldova U21	6	(0)
2021–	Moldova	6	(0)
- * Club domestic league appearances and goals as of 4 July 2026 ‡ National team caps and goals as of 22 August 2024

Marius Iosipoi (born 28 April 2000) is a Moldovan professional football player who plays as a midfielder for Moldovan Liga club Petrocub Hîncești.

== Club career ==
As a pupil of CSCT Buiucani, Iosipoi joined the Politehnica Iași academy for trials in June 2017. After returning to Dacia Buiucani in 2020, he scored once and assisted thrice in 19 appearances. In January 2021 he joined Veles Moscow on loan, making his debut in the Russian Football National League on 27 February 2021 in a game against Akron Tolyatti.

In June 2021 Iosipoi signed for Petrocub Hîncești with which he won the Moldovan Double in the 2023–2024 season. He scored 11 goals and assisted 10 in 78 appearances for the club. After his contract expired, Iosipoi joined the Russian First League club SKA-Khabarovsk in September 2024. He is currently playing for Moldovan top-flight club Milsami.

== International career ==
Marius Iosipoi made his debut for Moldova national football team on 28 March 2021 in a World Cup qualifier against Denmark.

== Honours ==
Petrocub Hîncești

- Moldovan Super Liga: 2023–24; runner-up: 2021–22, 2022–23
- Moldovan Cup: 2023–24
