= Mihai Plătică =

Moldovan footballer

Mihail Plătică
Personal information
- Date of birth: 15 March 1990 (age 36)
- Place of birth: Chișinău, Moldavian SSR, Soviet Union
- Height: 1.85 m (6 ft 1 in)
- Position: Midfielder

Youth career
- Sfîntul Gheorghe

Senior career*
Years	Team	Apps	(Gls)
2009–2011	Sfîntul Gheorghe	65	(15)
2011–2012	Academia Chişinău	25	(3)
2012–2014	Rubin Kazan	0	(0)
2013–2014	→ Neftekhimik (loan)	37	(1)
2014–2015	Zimbru Chișinău	10	(3)
2015	Rostov	1	(0)
2015–2016	Shinnik Yaroslavl	33	(2)
2016–2017	Sokol Saratov	33	(2)
2017–2019	Milsami Orhei	43	(11)
2020	Kyzylzhar	20	(0)
2021–2025	Petrocub Hîncești	66	(30)
2025–2026	Bălți	24	(4)
2026	Petrocub Hîncești	17	(0)

International career^{‡}
2011–2012	Moldova U21	7	(1)
2022–2026	Moldova	17	(1)
- * Club domestic league appearances and goals as of 2 October 2026 ‡ National team caps and goals as of 2 October 2026

Mihail Plătică (born 15 March 1990) is a Moldovan former professional footballer who played as an midfielder.

== Club career ==
On 31 January 2020, Plătică signed with FC Kyzylzhar in Kazakhstan.

On 9 February 2021, he returned to Moldova, signing a three-year contract with Petrocub Hîncești.

== Personal life ==
His younger brother Sergiu Plătică is also a football player.

== Career statistics ==
Scores and results list Moldova's goal tally first.

No.	Date	Venue	Opponent	Score	Result	Competition
1.	18 January 2022	Titanic Deluxe Belek Football Center, Belek, Turkey	Uganda	2–0	2–3	Friendly match

== Honours ==
Rubin Kazan

- Russian Super Cup: 2012

Milsami Orhei

- Moldovan National Division runner-up: 2017, 2018
- Moldovan Cup: 2017–18
- Moldovan Super Cup: 2019

Petrocub Hîncești

- Moldovan Super Liga: 2023–24; runner-up: 2020–21, 2021–22, 2022–23
- Moldovan Cup: 2023–24
