= Ion Sandu =

Moldovan footballer

Personal information
- Date of birth: 9 March 1993 (age 33)
- Place of birth: Soroca, Moldova
- Height: 1.83 m (6 ft 0 in)
- Position: Defender

Team information
- Current team: Codru Lozova
- Number: 4

Senior career*
| Years | Team | Apps | (Gls) |
| 2011–2014 | Costuleni | 70 | (0) |
| 2014 | Speranța Crihana Veche | 13 | (0) |
| 2014–2015 | Lokomotíva Košice | 14 | (0) |
| 2015–2017 | Academia Chișinău | 26 | (0) |
| 2017–2018 | Spicul Chișcăreni | 18 | (1) |
| 2018 | Petrocub Hîncești | 9 | (0) |
| 2019 | Spartanii Selemet | | |
| 2020– | Codru Lozova | 29 | (0) |

International career
| 2011 | Moldova U19 | 1 | (0) |
| 2013 | Moldova U21 | 1 | (0) |
- * Club domestic league appearances and goals

Ion Sandu (born 9 March 1993) is a Moldovan footballer who plays as a defender for Moldovan club Codru Lozova.
