= Victor Mudrac =

Moldovan footballer (born 1994)

Personal information
- Date of birth: 3 March 1994 (age 32)
- Place of birth: Tiraspol, Moldova
- Position: Centre-back

Team information
- Current team: Iberia 1999

Youth career
- Sheriff Tiraspol
- Școala Sportivă–4 Tiraspol

Senior career*
Years	Team	Apps	(Gls)
2011–2013	Olimpia Bălți	28	(1)
2013	→ Veris Chișinău (loan)	0	(0)
2014–2016	Dinamo-Auto	69	(7)
2017	Dacia Chișinău	12	(1)
2017–2019	Petrocub Hîncești	62	(10)
2020	Alashkert	1	(0)
2020	Slavia Mozyr	7	(0)
2021	Saburtalo Tbilisi	14	(0)
2022–2024	Petrocub Hîncești	51	(2)
2025–2026	Ordabasy	9	(1)
2026	Iberia 1999	0	(0)
2026-	FC Petrocub Hincesti	4	(0)

International career^{‡}
2012–2013	Moldova U19	3	(1)
2019–	Moldova	23	(1)
- * Club domestic league appearances and goals as of 15/11/26 @ 13:13(AEST) ‡ National team caps and goals as of 9 June 2025

Victor Mudrac (born 3 March 1994) is a Moldovan professional footballer who plays as a centre-back for Erovnuli Liga club Iberia 1999 and the Moldova national team.

== Career statistics ==
As of match played 13 Mar 2024

Club	Season	League			Cup		Continental		Other		Total	
Club	Season	Division	Apps	Goals	Apps	Goals	Apps	Goals	Apps	Goals	Apps	Goals
FC Dinamo-Auto Tiraspol	2013–14	Moldovan National Division	9	1	0	0	0	0	0	0	9	1
FC Dinamo-Auto Tiraspol	2014–15	Moldovan National Division	24	2	1	0	0	0	0	0	25	2
FC Dinamo-Auto Tiraspol	2015–16	Moldovan National Division	23	3	1	0	0	0	0	0	24	3
FC Dinamo-Auto Tiraspol	2016–17	Moldovan National Division	13	1	1	0	0	0	0	0	13	1
FC Dinamo-Auto Tiraspol	Total		69	7	3	0	0	0	0	0	72	7
FC Dacia Chișinău	2016–17	Moldovan National Division	12	1	1	0	0	0	0	0	13	1
FC Dacia Chișinău	Total		12	1	1	0	0	0	0	0	13	1
FC Petrocub Hîncești	2017	Moldovan National Division	15	3	2	0	0	0	0	0	17	3
FC Petrocub Hîncești	2018	Moldovan National Division	26	3	2	0	2	0	0	0	30	3
FC Petrocub Hîncești	2019	Moldovan National Division	21	4	1	0	2	0	0	0	27	4
FC Petrocub Hîncești	Total		62	10	5	0	4	0	0	0	71	10
FC Alashkert	2019–20	Armenian Premier League	1	0	0	0	0	0	0	0	1	0
FC Alashkert	Total		1	0	0	0	0	0	0	0	1	0
FC Slavia Mozyr	2020	Belarusian Premier League	7	0	2	0	0	0	0	0	9	0
FC Slavia Mozyr	Total		7	0	2	0	0	0	0	0	9	0
FC Saburtalo	2021	Erovnuli Liga	14	0	1	0	0	0	0	0	15	0
FC Saburtalo	Total		14	0	1	0	0	0	0	0	15	0
FC Petrocub Hîncești	2021–22	Moldovan Super Liga	8	0	1	0	0	0	0	0	9	0
FC Petrocub Hîncești	2022–23	Moldovan Super Liga	22	2	4	1	6	0	0	0	32	3
FC Petrocub Hîncești	2023–24	Moldovan Super Liga	0	0	1	0	0	0	0	0	1	0
FC Petrocub Hîncești	Total		30	2	6	1	6	0	0	0	42	3
Career total			195	20	18	1	10	0	0	0	223	21

== International career ==
=== International goals ===
Scores and results list Moldova's goal tally first.

No	Date	Venue	Opponent	Score	Result	Competition
1.	19 November 2024	Europa Point Stadium, Europa Point, Gibraltar	Gibraltar	1–0	1–1	Friendly
