= Ștefan Efros =

Moldovan footballer

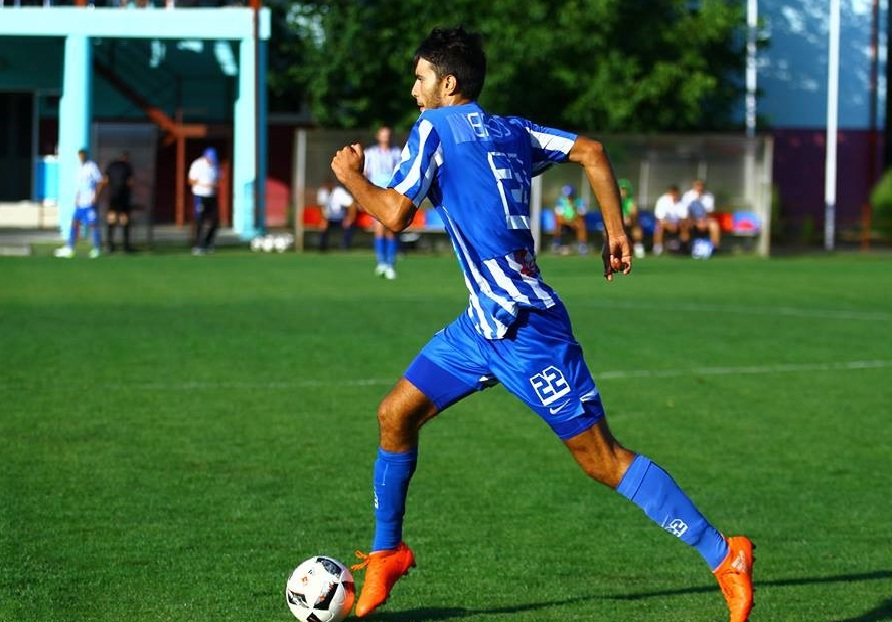
- Efros with Speranța Nisporeni in 2017

Personal information
- Full name: Ștefan Efros
- Date of birth: 8 May 1990 (age 36)
- Place of birth: Criuleni, SSR Moldova, Soviet Union
- Height: 1.95 m (6 ft 5 in)
- Position: Centre-back

Team information
- Current team: Dacia Buiucani
- Number: 20

Youth career
- Izvoraș-67
- Beșiktaș Chișinău

Senior career*
Years	Team	Apps	(Gls)
2012	Milsami II Orhei	10	(1)
2012–2013	Real Succes Chișinău	9	(0)
2013–2019	Speranța Nisporeni	123	(5)
2020	Mioveni	0	(0)
2020–2022	Petrocub Hîncești	46	(1)
2022	Milsami Orhei	7	(0)
2022–	Dacia Buiucani	76	(5)

International career^{‡}
2019–2020	Moldova	4	(0)
- * Club domestic league appearances and goals as of 1 June 2026 ‡ National team caps and goals as of 9 January 2025

Ștefan Efros (born 8 May 1990) is a Moldovan footballer who plays as a centre-back for Moldovan Liga club Dacia Buiucani, whom he captains.

== Club career ==
He started his career at Izvoraș-67 and also played for several teams in Moldovan "A" Division: Real Succes Chișinău and Milsami- Ursidos 2.

Ștefan Efros was awarded best Moldovan beach soccer player in 2012, and in 2013 represented his country at the Euro Beach Soccer League.

He signed with Speranța Nisporeni in 2013, and in 2017 he became team captain.

== International career ==
He made his Moldova national football team debut on 8 June 2019 in a Euro 2020 qualifier against Andorra, as a starter.
