= Ion Jardan =

Moldovan footballer

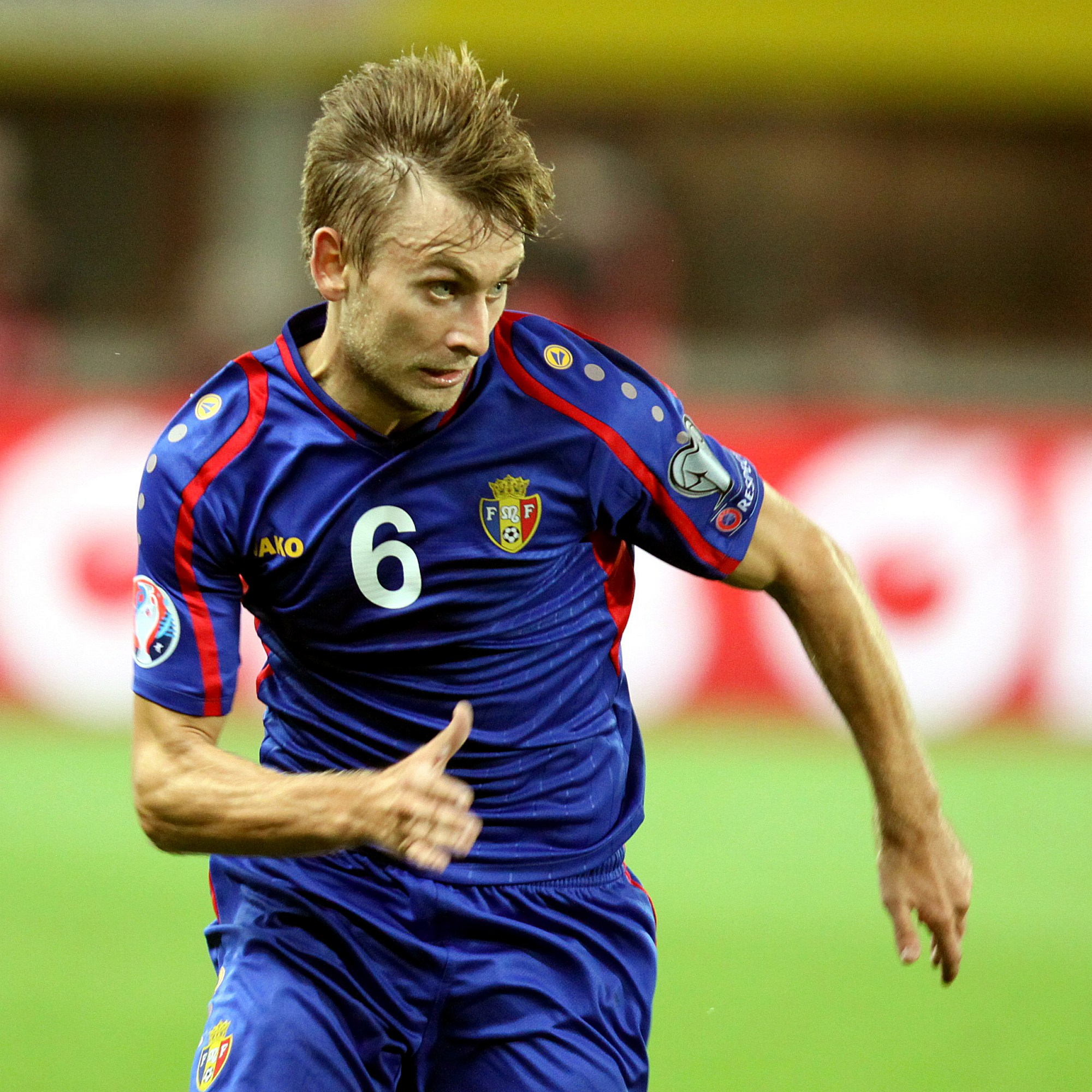
- Jardan with Moldova in 2015

Personal information
- Full name: Ion Jardan
- Date of birth: 10 January 1990 (age 36)
- Place of birth: Cornești, Moldavian SSR, Soviet Union
- Height: 1.82 m (5 ft 11 1/2 in)
- Position: Right-back

Team information
- Current team: Petrocub Hîncești
- Number: 90

Youth career
- 2004–2007: Olimp Ungheni

Senior career*
Years	Team	Apps	(Gls)
2007–2008	Olimp Ungheni	12	(1)
2008–2013	Rapid Ghidighici	116	(6)
2013	Arsenal Kyiv	0	(0)
2014–2017	Zimbru Chișinău	73	(2)
2017–2018	Sheriff Tiraspol	16	(0)
2018–2019	Zimbru Chișinău	26	(2)
2019–	Petrocub Hîncești	185	(25)

International career^{‡}
2010–2012	Moldova U21	14	(2)
2013–2023	Moldova	50	(0)
- * Club domestic league appearances and goals as of 1 June 2026 ‡ National team caps and goals as of 22 November 2023

Ion Jardan (born 10 January 1990) is a Moldovan footballer who plays as a right-back for Moldovan Liga club Petrocub Hîncești. He also played for the Moldova national football team.

== Club career ==
In 2013 Jardan signed a contract with Ukrainian Premier League side FC Arsenal Kyiv, but did not play any match for the main squad. After the bankruptcy of this club, in January 2014 he signed a deal with Romanian Liga I team FC Botoșani.

== International career ==
On 14 June 2013 he made his debut for the Moldova national football team in a friendly match against Kyrgyzstan.

== Honours ==
Zimbru Chișinău

- Moldovan Cup: 2013–14
- Moldovan Super Cup: 2014

Sheriff Tiraspol

- Moldovan National Division: 2016–17, 2017
- Moldovan Cup: 2016–17

Petrocub Hîncești

- Moldovan Liga: 2023–24, 2025–26
- Moldovan Cup: 2019–20, 2023–24
