= Vadim Crîcimari =

Moldovan footballer (1988–2026)

Personal information
- Date of birth: 22 August 1988
- Place of birth: Tiraspol, Moldavian SSR, Soviet Union
- Date of death: 4 November 2026 (aged 38)
- Height: 1.78 m (5 ft 10 in)
- Position: Forward

Senior career*
Years	Team	Apps	(Gls)
2009–2010	Sfîntul Gheorghe	17	(4)
2009–2011	Mughan	16	(1)
2011–2012	CSCA–Rapid Chișinău	26	(0)
2012–2013	Speranța Crihana Veche	31	(14)
2013	Zimbru Chișinău	15	(2)
2014–2015	Tosno	0	(0)
2014–2015	→ SKA-Energiya (loan)	6	(0)
2016	Academia Chișinău	20	(3)
2016	→ Dinamo-Auto (loan)	1	(0)
2017	Speranța Nisporeni	11	(1)
2018	Codru Lozova		(10)
2019	Florești		(16)
2020–2021	Dacia Buiucani	35	(10)
2021–2022	Oțelul Galați	25	(10)
2022	Dacia Buiucani	0	(0)
2022–2024	Victoria Bardar	1	(1)
2024–2026	Speranis Nisporeni	0	(0)
- * Club domestic league appearances and goals

Vadim Crîcimari (22 August 1988 – 4 November 2026) was a Moldovan footballer who played as a forward.

== Career ==
At the end of July 2021, Crîcimari joined Oțelul Galați.

== Personal life and death ==
Crîcimari was born in Tiraspol, Soviet Union on 22 August 1988. He died from Burkitt lymphoma on 4 November 2026, at the age of 38. He had been receiving specialist treatment in Italy for the disease.

== Honours ==
CSCA–Rapid

- Moldovan Cup runner-up: 2011–12

Oțelul Galați

- Liga III: 2021–22
