= Serghei Diulgher =

Moldovan footballer

Personal information
- Full name: Serghei Diulgher
- Date of birth: 21 March 1991 (age 35)
- Place of birth: Bender, Moldova
- Height: 1.85 m (6 ft 1 in)
- Position: Defender

Team information
- Current team: Florești
- Number: 22

Youth career
- Sheriff Tiraspol

Senior career*
Years	Team	Apps	(Gls)
2008–2010	Sheriff Tiraspol	15	(0)
2011–2014	→ Tiraspol (loan)	44	(1)
2014–2017	Dinamo-Auto Tiraspol	45	(0)
2017	Speranța Nisporeni	28	(0)
2018	Dinamo-Auto Tiraspol	25	(2)
2019	Sloboda Užice	1	(0)
2019	Dinamo-Auto Tiraspol	13	(0)
2020–	Florești	16	(0)

International career^{‡}
2009	Moldova U19	2	(0)
2011	Moldova U21	4	(0)
- * Club domestic league appearances and goals as of 14:22, 1 June 2021 (UTC) ‡ National team caps and goals as of 2 August 2019

Serghei Diulgher (born 21 March 1991) is a Moldovan footballer who plays for FC Florești in Moldovan National Division as a defender.

== Club career ==
He spent most of his career playing at Moldovan National Division, with an exception being a short spell in Serbian First League with Sloboda Užice.

== International career ==
He has represented his country at U19U21 international level.

== Honours ==
Sheriff

- Moldovan National Division: 2009–10
- Moldovan Cup: 2010

Tiraspol

- Moldovan Cup: 2013
