= Ștefan Burghiu =

Moldovan footballer

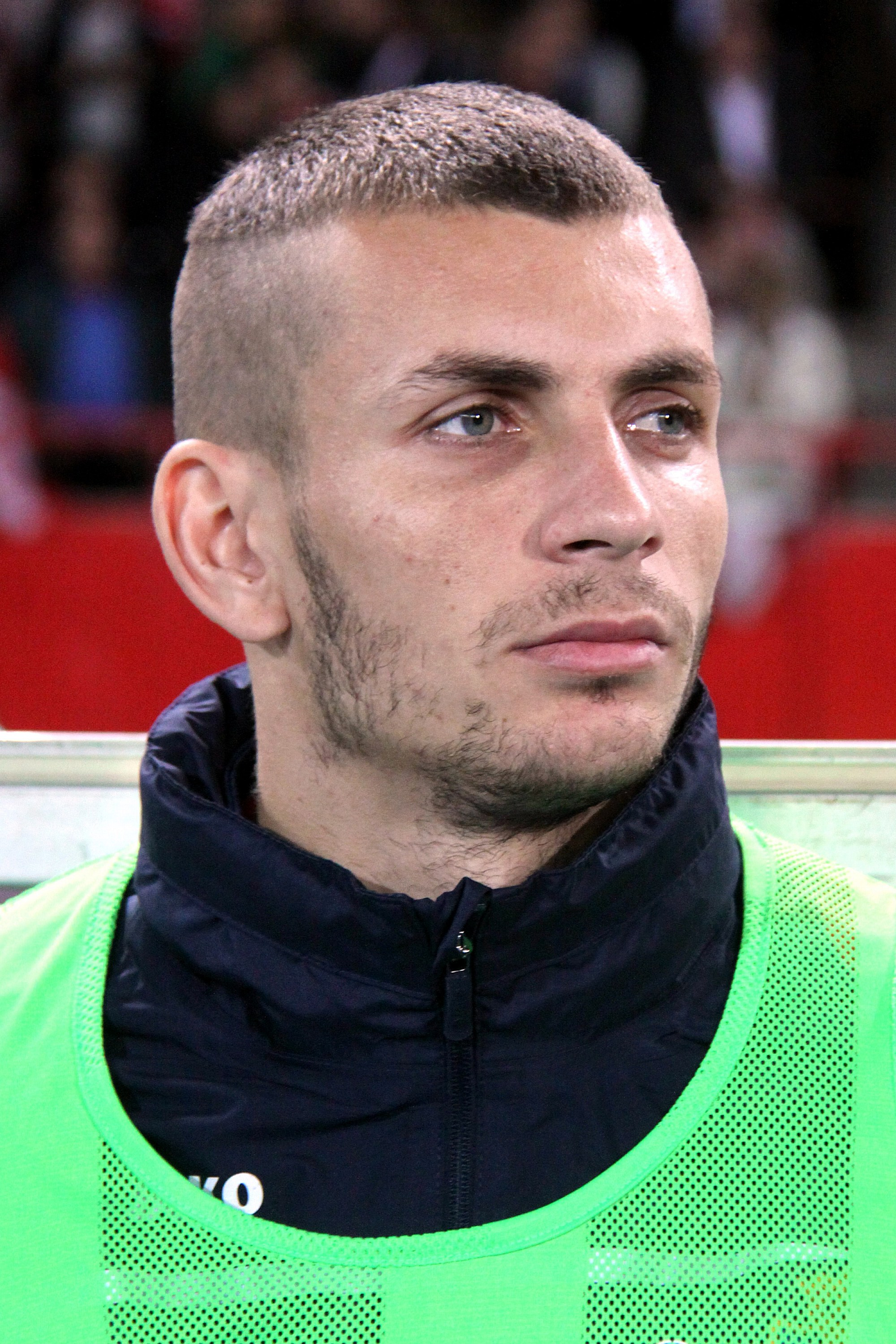
- Burghiu with Moldova in 2015

Personal information
- Full name: Ștefan Burghiu
- Date of birth: 28 March 1991 (age 35)
- Place of birth: Zăicani, SSR Moldova, Soviet Union
- Height: 1.89 m (6 ft 2 in)
- Position: Defender

Team information
- Current team: Zimbru Chișinău
- Number: 3

Senior career*
Years	Team	Apps	(Gls)
2009−2010	Real Succes Chișinău	?	(?)
2011−2013	Nistru Otaci	65	(3)
2013–2017	Zimbru Chișinău	78	(1)
2016	→ Petrocub Hîncești (loan)	14	(2)
2017	Zhetysu	24	(1)
2018	Sfântul Gheorghe	20	(0)
2019	Petrocub Hîncești	4	(0)
2019	Focșani	?	(?)
2020	Speranța Nisporeni	2	(0)
2020–	Zimbru Chișinău	110	(7)

International career^{‡}
2014–2015	Moldova	7	(0)
- * Club domestic league appearances and goals as of 5 January 2025 ‡ National team caps and goals as of 2 April 2021

Ștefan Burghiu (born 28 March 1991) is a Moldovan footballer who plays as a defender for Moldovan Liga club Zimbru Chișinău, whom he captains.

== International career ==
Burghiu played seven matches for the Moldova national team between 2014 and 2015. He made his international debut in a friendly match against Sweden on 17 January 2014.

== Honours ==
Zimbru Chișinău

- Moldovan Cup: 2013–14
- Moldovan Super Cup: 2014

Zhetysu

- Kazakhstan First Division: 2017
