= Ceadîr-Lunga Stadium =

Football Stadium in Moldova

Coordinates: 46.0569°N 28.8341°E

- Interactive map of Ceadîr-Lunga Stadium
- Full name: Saxan Ceadîr-Lunga Stadium
- Location: Ceadîr-Lunga
- Owner: FC Saxan
- Capacity: 2,000
- Surface: Grass
- Field size: 105 x 60 m

Construction
- Opened: 2010

Tenant
- FC Saxan

Ceadîr-Lunga Stadium is a stadium in Ceadîr-Lunga, Moldova. It has a capacity of 2,000 seats.

== History ==
FC Saxan played their first match in the stadium in 2012.
