= Victor Buga =

Moldovan professional footballer

Personal information
- Date of birth: 26 June 1994 (age 32)
- Place of birth: Chișinău, Moldova
- Height: 1.78 m (5 ft 10 in)
- Position: Goalkeeper

Team information
- Current team: Spartanii Selemet
- Number: 1

Senior career*
Years	Team	Apps	(Gls)
2011–2014	Zimbru-2 Chișinău		
2014–2018	Zimbru Chișinău	7	(0)
2015	→ Gagauziya Comrat (loan)	8	(0)
2015–2016	→ Petrocub Hîncești (loan)	25	(0)
2017	→ Petrocub Hîncești (loan)	10	(0)
2019	Energeticianul	5	(0)
2021–2023	Milsami Orhei	15	(0)
2023–	Spartanii Selemet	12	(0)

International career
2014–2015	Moldova U21	3	(0)
- * Club domestic league appearances and goals as of 26 March 2024

Victor Buga (born 26 June 1994) is a Moldovan professional footballer who plays as a goalkeeper for Spartanii Selemet.
