= Sergiu Plătică =

Moldovan footballer

Personal information
- Date of birth: 5 June 1991 (age 35)
- Place of birth: Chișinău, SSR Moldova, Soviet Union
- Height: 1.80 m (5 ft 11 in)
- Positions: Forward; defender

Team information
- Current team: Milsami Orhei
- Number: 27

Senior career*
Years	Team	Apps	(Gls)
2010	Sfântul Gheorghe	2	(0)
2013–2015	Budăi	47	(36)
2015	Sfântul Gheorghe	12	(12)
2016–2017	Speranța Nisporeni	57	(15)
2017	→ Milsami Orhei (loan)	0	(0)
2018–2019	Milsami Orhei	48	(2)
2020–2026	Petrocub Hîncești	151	(23)
2026–	Milsami Orhei	0	(0)

International career^{‡}
2017–	Moldova	59	(0)
- * Club domestic league appearances and goals as of 15 September 2026 ‡ National team caps and goals as of 30 March 2026

Sergiu Plătică (born 5 June 1991) is a Moldovan footballer who plays as a forward and defender for Moldovan Liga club Milsami Orhei and the Moldova national team.

== Club career ==
On 19 June 2017 he was loaned by his club Speranța Nisporeni to Milsami Orhei for the duration of Milsami's European campaign. On 29 June, he scored a goal in the Europa League qualifying game against CS Fola Esch. After the return leg on 6 July 2017, Milsami were eliminated by Fola, and he returned to Speranta before playing any national league games for Milsami and just two and a half weeks at the club.

He returned to Milsami Orhei on a permanent basis in January 2018.

== International ==
He made his Moldova national football team debut on 17 January 2017 in a game against Qatar. That game was not an official FIFA-approved international game. He made his official national team debut on 6 October 2017 in a World Cup qualifier against Ireland.

== Personal life ==
His older brother Mihai Plătică is also a football player.

== Honours ==
Milsami Orhei

- Moldovan Cup: 2017–18

Petrocub Hîncești

- Moldovan Cup: 2019–20
