= Petru Postoroncă =

Moldovan footballer

Personal information
- Date of birth: 9 December 1991 (age 34)
- Place of birth: Chișinău, Moldova
- Height: 1.78 m (5 ft 10 in)
- Position: Midfielder

Team information
- Current team: FV Langenwinkel
- Number: 9

Youth career
- Dacia-2 Buiucani

Senior career*
Years	Team	Apps	(Gls)
2011–2015	Dacia Chișinău	4	(0)
2011–2013	→ Dacia-2 Buiucani (loan)	26	(4)
2013–2014	→ Sfântul Gheorghe (loan)	9	(2)
2014–2015	→ Dinamo-Auto (loan)	9	(0)
2015–2016	Spicul Chișcăreni	24	(10)
2016–2017	Ungheni	6	(0)
2017–2018	Sfântul Gheorghe		
2019	Victoria Bardar		
2020–	FV Langenwinkel	0	(0)
- * Club domestic league appearances and goals as of 00:39, 17 May 2020 (UTC)

Petru Postoroncă (born 9 December 1991, in Chișinău, Moldova) is a Moldovan footballer who plays as a midfielder for German club FV Langenwinkel.

== Career ==
On 12 May 2020, German Landesliga club FV Langenwinkel confirmed that Postoroncă had joined the club.
