= Vladimir Ambros =

Moldovan footballer

Personal information
- Date of birth: 30 December 1993 (age 32)
- Place of birth: Chișinău, Moldova
- Height: 1.80 m (5 ft 11 in)
- Positions: Attacking midfielder; forward

Senior career*
Years	Team	Apps	(Gls)
2013–2014	Rapid Ghidighici	2	(0)
2014–2026	Petrocub Hîncești	193	(107)
2017	→ Sheriff Tiraspol (loan)	8	(0)

International career^{‡}
2015–2020	Moldova	12	(1)
- * Club domestic league appearances and goals as of 2 August 2026 ‡ National team caps and goals as of 6 April 2021

Vladimir Ambros (born 30 December 1993) is a former Moldovan footballer who most recently played as a forward and captained Moldovan Liga club Petrocub Hîncești.

== International career ==
=== International goals ===
Scores and results list Moldova's goal tally first.

No.	Date	Venue	Opponent	Score	Result	Competition
1.	22 March 2019	Zimbru Stadium, Chișinău, Moldova	France	1–4	1–4	UEFA Euro 2020 qualification
