= Roman Șumchin =

Moldovan footballer

Personal information
- Date of birth: 11 March 1993 (age 33)
- Place of birth: Moldova
- Height: 1.80 m (5 ft 11 in)
- Position: Forward

Team information
- Current team: Spartanii Selemet
- Number: 13

Senior career*
Years	Team	Apps	(Gls)
2010–2011	CF Găgăuzia	0	(0)
2015–2016	CS Petrocub	24	(7)
2015–2017	Gagauziya-Oguzsport		
2017	FC Saxan	7	(1)
2017	CS Petrocub	3	(0)
2018–2019	Dinamo-Auto	4	(0)
2019–2020	Sevan	20	(6)
2021–2022	Spartanii Selemet		
2022	Speranța Drochia		
2022–	Spartanii Selemet	32	(7)

International career
2015–	Moldova	0	(0)
- * Club domestic league appearances and goals as of 26 March 2024

Roman Șumchin (born 11 March 1993) is a Moldovan footballer who plays as forward for Spartanii Selemet.

== International career ==
Șumchin was called up to the senior Moldova squad for a UEFA Euro 2016 qualifier against Russia in October 2015.
