= Hîncești Municipal Stadium =

Football stadium in Hîncești, Moldova

Coordinates: 46.825284°N 28.586687°E

- Stadionul Municipal
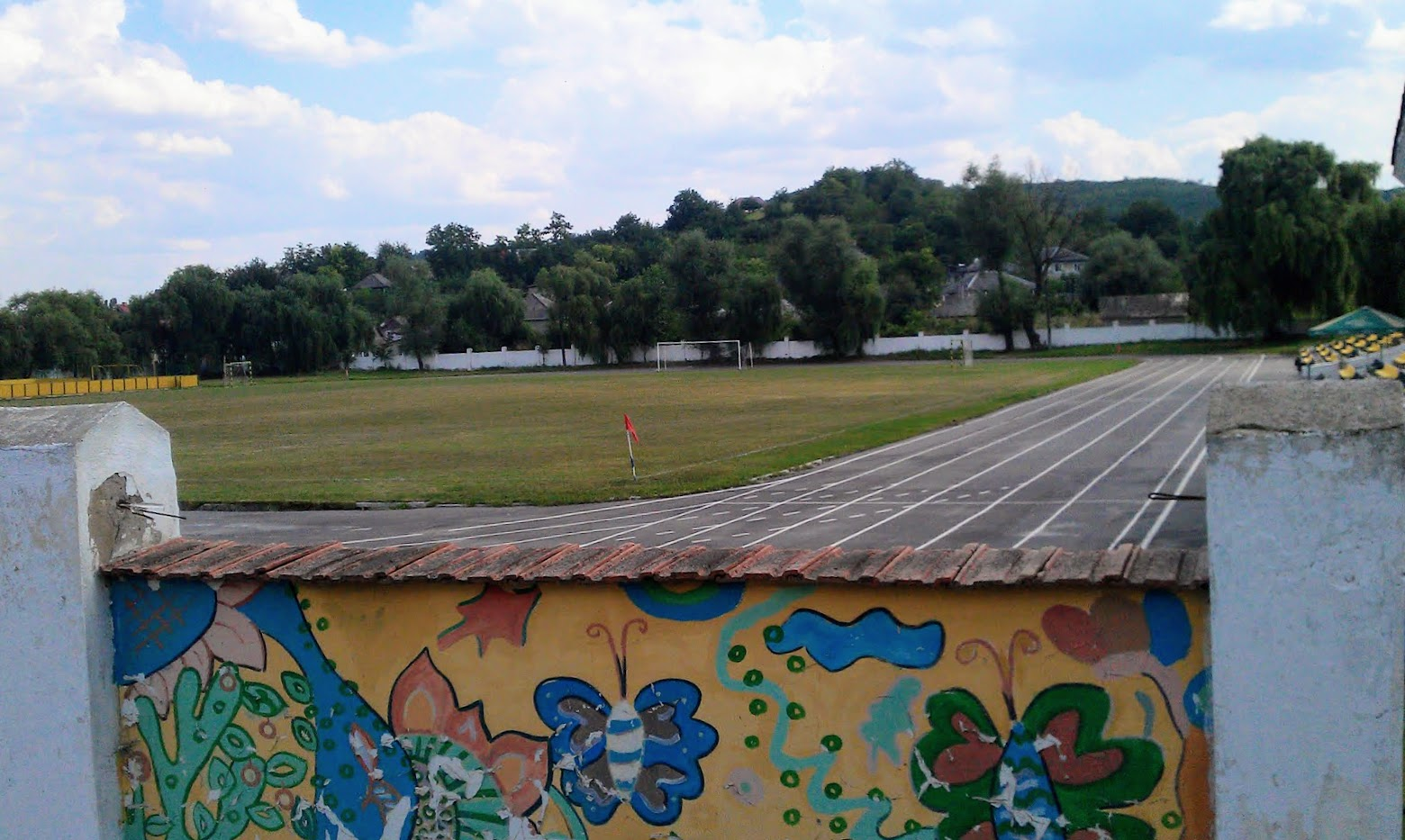
- Interactive map of Hîncești Municipal Stadium
- Full name: Stadionul Municipal Hîncești
- Address: Hîncești; Moldova
- Owner: Petrocub Hîncești
- Capacity: 1,633
- Surface: Grass
- Field size: 105 x 68 m

Construction
- Opened: 1975

Tenant
- Petrocub Hîncești

The Hîncești Municipal Stadium (Romanian: Stadionul Municipal) is a football stadium in city of Hîncești, Moldova built in 1975. It is home to Petrocub Hîncești of the Moldovan Liga.

In 2023 the venue hosted the 2022–23 Moldovan Cup final. Sheriff Tiraspol won the title for the 12th time
