= Radu Gînsari =

Moldovan footballer

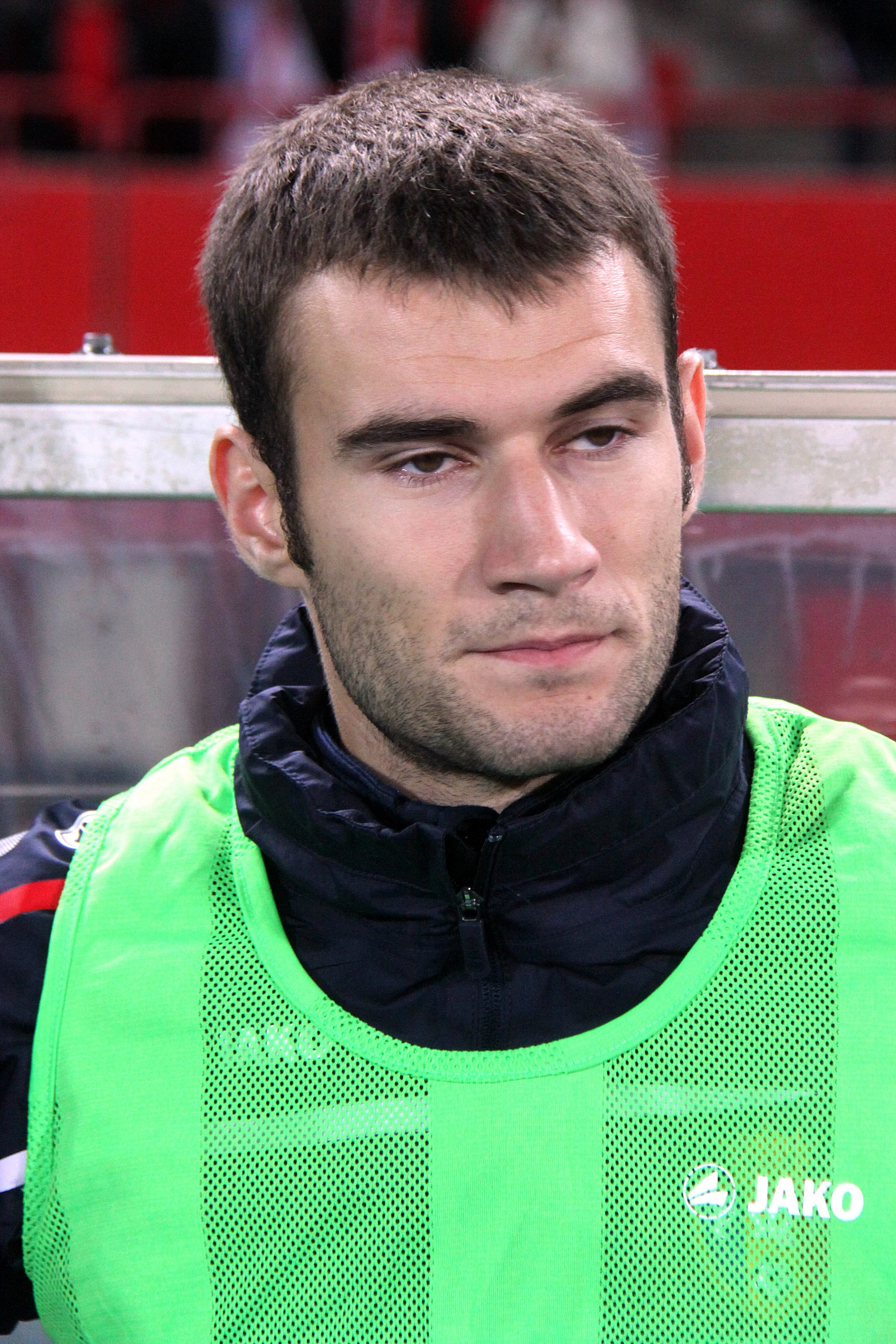
- Gînsari with Moldova in 2015

Personal information
- Date of birth: 10 December 1991 (age 34)
- Place of birth: Chișinău, Moldova
- Height: 1.82 m (5 ft 11 1/2 in)
- Positions: Winger; midfielder

Team information
- Current team: Milsami Orhei
- Number: 10

Youth career
- CSCT Buiucani

Senior career*
Years	Team	Apps	(Gls)
2007–2013	Academia Chișinău	124	(35)
2013–2014	Zimbru Chișinău	23	(6)
2014–2017	Sheriff Tiraspol	63	(13)
2017–2019	Hapoel Haifa	65	(8)
2019–2020	Krylia Sovetov	18	(3)
2020	→ Ironi Kiryat Shmona (loan)	4	(1)
2021	Milsami Orhei	7	(6)
2021–2022	Xanthi	23	(3)
2022–	Milsami Orhei	84	(37)

International career
	Moldova U19	3	(0)
	Moldova U21	15	(4)
2012–2022	Moldova	47	(7)
- * Club domestic league appearances and goals as of 27 June 2025

Radu Gînsari (born 10 December 1991) is a Moldovan professional footballer who plays as a winger or midfielder for Moldovan Liga club Milsami Orhei, which he captains.

He also has Russian citizenship as Radu Leonidovich Gynsar (Russian: Раду Леонидович Гынсарь) and was registered with the Russian Premier League as a domestic player.

== Club career ==
=== Early career ===
Ginsari started playing football at the age of 8 with a club "Razdisor" from Ciocana region. After a few months of training, he was transferred to CSCT Buiucani at the age of 9 having Jardan Vasile as his coach. During the next 3–4 years, was trained some important chapters in the Book of Football from Andronic Mihai. At the age of 15 he continued his training with another coach, Ciubaru Igor. At the age of 16, he was purchased by FC Academia UTM Chişinău, where he played five years.

His initial position on the field was central midfielder. He sometimes played as a winger or forward. His most comfortable position, and also the position where he is most efficient, is central midfielder.

He initially started playing with the number 4 on his shirt when he was playing at CSCT Buiucani. It then was changed to number 14, which he thinks is his lucky number.

=== Professional career ===
He spent 5 years playing for FC Academia Chişinău. In the winter of 2013 he had trials at Rubin Kazan, but for undisclosed reasons did not sign with the Russian side. Before he signed with Zimbru Chișinău during that summer, he had trials with Olhanense, but didn't sign either. He eventually got injured during training. In his first season for Zimbru Chișinău he scored 6 goals and he won the Moldovan Cup. On 11 June he announced on his Facebook page that he is no longer a Zimbru player with a message, "On this day I officially announce that I have left the club. I want to thank all the teammates and staff. Good luck!". On 16 June he signed with Sheriff Tiraspol. His first goal for Sheriff Tiraspol was in the Moldovan Super Cup match against his previous club, Zimbru Chișinău. Unfortunately, his team lost with penalty kicks.

On 28 June 2019, he joined Russian Premier League club PFC Krylia Sovetov Samara. On 6 February 2020, he returned to Israel, joining Ironi Kiryat Shmona on a 6-month loan.

On 26 February 2021, Gînsari returned to Moldova, signing for Moldovan National Division side FC Milsami Orhei.

== International career ==
During his tenth cap, Gînsari scored his first international goal. It came against Switzerland in a friendly match in June 2016.

Gînsari scored again, in a 3–1 defeat to Turkey during a March 2017 friendly match.

== Career statistics ==
=== International goals ===
As of match played 18 November 2018. Moldova score listed first, score column indicates score after each Gînsari goal.

International goals by date, venue, cap, opponent, score, result and competition
No.	Date	Venue	Cap	Opponent	Score	Result	Competition
1	3 June 2016	Cornaredo Stadium, Lugano, Switzerland	10	Switzerland	1–1	1–2	Friendly
2	27 March 2017	New Eskişehir Stadium, Eskişehir, Turkey	16	Turkey	1–3	1–3	Friendly
3	6 June 2017	Netanya Stadium, Netanya, Israel	17	Israel	1–0	1–1	Friendly
4	11 June 2017	Zimbru Stadium, Chișinău, Moldova	18	Georgia	1–0	2–2	2018 FIFA World Cup qualification
5	12 October 2018	Zimbru Stadium, Chișinău, Moldova	27	San Marino	1–0	2–0	2018–19 UEFA Nations League D
6	12 October 2018	Zimbru Stadium, Chișinău, Moldova	27	San Marino	2–0	2–0	2018–19 UEFA Nations League D
7	18 November 2018	Zimbru Stadium, Chișinău, Moldova	30	Luxembourg	1–0	1–1	2018–19 UEFA Nations League D

== Personal life ==
=== Family ===
Radu was born to Elena and Leonid Gînsari. He has a brother named Sandu Gînsari.

Radu Gînsari declares himself as Romanian and supports the reunification of Moldova and Romania.

=== Education ===
He graduated with a bachelor in Modern Languages and Management in 2010. He is currently a student at Moldova State University with the Faculty of Finance and Banking.

== Honours ==
Zimbru Chișinău

- Moldovan Cup: 2013–14

Hapoel Haifa

- Israel State Cup: 2017–18
- Israel Super Cup: 2018

Individual

- Moldovan National Division Best Forward: 2014
- Moldovan National Division Top Scorer: 2023-24
