= Dinamo Stadium (Bender) =

Football stadium in Bender, Moldova

Stadionul Dinamo
- Interactive map of Stadionul Dinamo
- Address: 117a Comunisticescaia Street; Bender; Transnistria, Moldova
- Coordinates: 46°49′02.7″N 29°28′35.2″E
- Capacity: 4,981
- Surface: Grass
- Field size: 105 by 68 metres (114.8 yd × 74.4 yd)

Construction
- Opened: 2006
- Renovated: 2018

Tenants
- Tighina; Florești

Stadionul Dinamo (Russian: Стадион «Динамо») is a football stadium in Bender, Moldova. It is the home ground of Tighina. In addition to Tighina, Florești have also used the stadium as a home ground. Opened in 2006, it has a capacity of 5,061 seats. The pitch has a grass surface. Renovated in 2018, it is a UEFA category one stadium. It is one of several stadiums in the former Soviet Bloc that are called Dinamo.
