= Oleg Molla =

Moldovan footballer

Personal information
- Date of birth: 22 February 1986 (age 40)
- Place of birth: Chișinău, Moldavian SSR
- Height: 1.73 m (5 ft 8 in)
- Position: Striker

Senior career*
| Years | Team | Apps | (Gls) |
| 2008–2009 | Iskra-Stal | 30 | (2) |
| 2009–2010 | Dacia Chișinău | 1 | (0) |
| 2010 | Sfîntul Gheorghe | 17 | (0) |
| 2010–2011 | Dacia Chișinău | 22 | (4) |
| 2011–2013 | Zimbru Chișinău | 43 | (21) |
| 2013 | Dacia Chișinău | 26 | (6) |
| 2014–2015 | Tiraspol | 30 | (7) |
| 2015 | FC Saxan | 6 | (0) |
| 2016–2020 | Spicul Chișcăreni | 21 | (15) |
| 2021 | Victoria Bardar | | |
| 2022 | Pelliron FCA | | |
| 2023– | Victoria Bardar | 1 | (1) |
| Total | | 139 | (33) |
- * Club domestic league appearances and goals as of 31 January 2014

Oleg Molla (born 22 February 1986, Chișinău, Moldavian SSR) is a Moldavian football striker.

== Club statistics ==
- Total matches played in Moldavian First League: 123 matches – 28 goals
