= FC Dacia Buiucani =

Association football club in Moldova

Dacia Buiucani
- Full name: Fotbal Club Dacia Buiucani
- Founded: 1997; 29 years ago as CSCA Buiucani
- Ground: Nisporeni Central Stadium
- Capacity: 5,200
- President: Constantin Anghel
- Head Coach: Igor Negrescu
- League: Liga
- 2025–26: Liga, 6th of 8
- Website: buiucani.md
Home colours	Away colours

Fotbal Club Dacia Buiucani, commonly known as Dacia Buiucani is a Moldovan football club from the Buiucani sector of Chișinău. The club competes in the Moldovan Liga, the top tier of Moldovan football. The academy of the club is called CSCT Buiucani, and is widely known for its export of young players. CSCT is an abbreviation for Sports Club for Children and Youth (Romanian: Clubul Sportiv pentru Copii și Tineret).

The club plays its home matches at the Nisporeni Central Stadium, which has a capacity of 5.200 spectators. The current head coach is Igor Negrescu.

== History ==
The club was founded as CSCA Buiucani on 25 September 1997. In July 2011, the club became FC Dacia Chișinău's reserve team and changed its name to Dacia-2 Buiucani. This cooperation lasted until March 2018, when Dacia Chișinău withdrew from the Moldovan National Division. Dacia Buiucani then started anew in the third tier of Moldovan football. They achieved two consecutive promotions and finished in 5th place in their first season in the top division. In June 2021, Dacia Buiucani were voluntarily relegated from the Moldovan National Division due to financial reasons. Dacia Buiucani returned to the Super Liga in seasons 2022-2023 and has since been a regular participant in the league.

=== Name history ===
- 1997–2011: CSCA Buiucani
- 2011–2017: Dacia-2 Buiucani
- Since 2018: Dacia Buiucani

== Players ==
As of 12 July 2026

Note: Flags indicate national team as defined under FIFA eligibility rules; some limited exceptions apply. Players may hold more than one non-FIFA nationality.

No.	Pos.	Nation	Player
2	DF	MDA	Doru Calestru
3	DF	MDA	Denis Baciu
4	DF	MDA	Cristian Ghedrouțan
7	MF	MDA	Vitalie Dumbrava
8	MF	MDA	Igor Lambarschi
9	FW	MDA	Vlad Lupașco
10	MF	MDA	Victor Ciumașu
11	FW	MDA	Viorel Vărzaru
12	GK	MDA	Roman Dumenco
15	GK	MDA	Bogdan Suruceanu
16	MF	MDA	Alexandru Muntean
17	MF	MDA	Cristian Nagurnea
18	MF	MDA	Daniel Popovici

No.	Pos.	Nation	Player
20	DF	MDA	Ștefan Efros (captain)
21	FW	MDA	Valeriu Gurgurov
23	MF	MDA	Roman Novicov
27	FW	MDA	Serghei Țurcan
28	MF	MDA	Sebastian Suruceanu
29	DF	MDA	Marius Roșioru
30	MF	MDA	Ion Ciobanu
35	GK	MDA	Ciprian Tuhar
66	DF	MDA	Dumitru Straistaru
70	DF	MDA	Vlad Coliș
90	DF	MDA	Artiom Dijinari
91	FW	MDA	Antonii Josan

== Honours ==
- Liga 1 (level 2)
  - Winners (2): 2022–23, 2024–25
  - Runners-up (2): 2013–14, 2019
- Divizia B (level 3)
  - Runners-up (1): 2018

== League history ==
Season	League									Cup	Super Cup	Ref
Season	Division	Pos	Pld	W	D	L	GF	GA	Pts	Cup	Super Cup	Ref
2018	3rd	↑ 2nd	18	11	3	4	59	15	36	First round	—	
2019	2nd	↑ 2nd	28	22	3	3	68	17	69	First round	—	
2020–21	1st	↓ 5th	36	13	9	14	44	45	48	Round of 16	—	
2021–22	2nd	↑ 3rd	22	14	6	2	58	15	48	Second round	—	
2022–23	1st	7th	14	4	4	6	14	14	16	Quarter-finals	—	
2022–23	2nd	↑ 1st	10	8	2	0	26	3	26	Quarter-finals	—	
2023–24	1st	6th	24	3	7	14	20	58	16	Quarter-finals	—	
2024–25	1st	7th	14	2	5	7	8	19	11	Round of 16	—	
2024–25	2nd	↑ 1st	10	9	1	0	38	3	28	Round of 16	—	
