= FC Petrocub Hîncești =

Association football club in Moldova

Petrocub Hîncești
- Full name: Fotbal Club Petrocub Hîncești
- Nicknames: Alb-negrii (The White-Blacks); Leii din Hîncești (The Hîncești Lions)
- Founded: 27 November 1999; 26 years ago
- Ground: Municipal Stadium
- Capacity: 1,633
- President: Mihail Usatîi
- Head coach: Shota Makharadze
- League: Liga
- 2025–26: Liga, 1st of 8 (champions)
Home colours	Away colours

Fotbal Club Petrocub Hîncești, commonly known as Petrocub Hîncești (PET-roe-kub hin-CHESHT), or simply Petrocub, is a Moldovan professional football club from Hîncești. They play in the Moldovan Liga, the top tier of Moldovan football. Its home ground is the Municipal Stadium in Hîncești.

== History ==
In January 2024, Petrocub Hîncești entered into a partnership with an unnamed investment company, which also saw former Asante Kotoko CEO, Nana Yaw Amponsah, being named as the new President of the club. On 18 May 2024, after a 4–1 victory over Zimbru Chișinău, Petrocub Hîncești have been declared champions of the Super Liga for the first time in their history. Shortly after winning the title, the Samaritan Investment Group led by Nana Yaw Amponsah decided to end their collaboration with the club and moved to another Moldovan team Spartanii Sportul.
On 13 August 2024, after winning their UEFA Europa League third qualifying round tie against The New Saints, they advanced to the play-off round. However, they were ultimately defeated by Ludogorets Razgrad, which moved them down to the league phase of the UEFA Conference League, making them only the second Moldovan team to reach the group or league stage of a UEFA club competition.

== Emblem ==
Since, their symbol used to always looks like the Black-White logo, as their 2nd emblem is Salty-Yellow (Noble Knight (Cool shade of blue), Red, and Green. Same as the Black and White logo).

== Players ==
As of 2 September 2026

Note: Flags indicate national team as defined under FIFA eligibility rules; some limited exceptions apply. Players may hold more than one non-FIFA nationality.

No.	Pos.	Nation	Player
1	GK	MDA	Silviu Șmalenea
2	DF	MDA	Vlad Pascari
3	DF	MDA	Cătălin Cucoș
4	DF	MDA	Victor Mudrac
7	MF	MDA	Marius Iosipoi
10	MF	MDA	Bogdan Musteață
13	MF	MDA	Maxim Cojocaru
15	FW	MDA	Petru Popescu
20	MF	MDA	Stanislav Șveț
21	DF	MDA	Ioan-Călin Revenco
23	MF	MDA	Mihai Lupan

No.	Pos.	Nation	Player
24	MF	MDA	Ovidiu David
25	MF	MDA	Ilie Botnari
27	FW	MDA	Mihai Sava
31	GK	MDA	Victor Dodon
37	MF	MDA	Dan Pușcaș
50	MF	MDA	Daniel Țugulea
66	DF	MDA	Ion Borș
77	DF	MDA	Serafim Cojocari
79	MF	MDA	Victor Bogaciuc
90	DF	MDA	Ion Jardan (captain)
92	MF	MDA	Pavel Nazari

== Honours ==
- Liga
  - Winners (2): 2023–24, 2025–26
- Divizia B
  - Winners (2): 2004–05, 2013–14
- Cupa Moldovei
  - Winners (2): 2019–20, 2023–24

== League history ==
Season	League									Cup	Super Cup	Europe		Top scorer (league)	Ref
Season	Division	Pos	Pld	W	D	L	GF	GA	Pts	Cup	Super Cup	Europe		Top scorer (league)	Ref
2013–14	3rd	↑ 1st	16	13	0	3	45	12	39	—		—			
2014–15	2nd	↑ 2nd	22	13	6	3	55	21	45	Round of 16	—	—		(Moldova) Vladimir Ambros (25)	
2015–16	1st	8th	27	6	3	18	21	53	21	Round of 16	—	—		(Moldova) Roman Șumchin (7)	
2016–17	1st	6th	30	8	10	12	31	38	34	Semi-finals	—	—			
2017	1st	3rd	18	7	5	6	25	16	26	Semi-finals	—	—		(Moldova) Vladimir Ambros (9)	
2018	1st	3rd	28	12	9	7	38	28	45	Quarter-finals	—	UEL	1Q	(Moldova) Vladimir Ambros (12)	
2019	1st	3rd	28	14	8	6	34	21	50	Winners	—	UEL	1Q	(Moldova) Vadim Gulceac (6) (Moldova) Dan Taras (6)	
2020–21	1st	2nd	36	25	8	3	82	18	83	Semi-finals	—	UEL	1Q	(Moldova) Sergiu Plătică (11)	
2021–22	1st	2nd	28	20	4	4	62	20	64	Quarter-finals	—	UECL	2Q	(Moldova) Vladimir Ambros (17)	
2022–23	1st	2nd	24	14	6	4	36	17	48	Semi-finals	—	UECL	3Q	(Moldova) Marius Iosipoi (7)	
2023–24	1st	1st	24	15	7	2	59	12	52	Winners	—	UECL	2Q	(Moldova) Vladimir Ambros (10) (Moldova) Mihai Plătică (10)	
2024–25	1st	4th	24	10	7	7	40	26	37	Quarter-finals	—	UCL; UEL; UECL	2Q; PO; LP	(Moldova) Marin Căruntu (4) (Moldova) Dan Pușcaș (4)	
2025–26	1st	1st	31	22	7	2	40	26	73	Semi-finals	—	UECL	2Q	(Moldova) Petru Popescu (15)	

== European record ==
As of match played on 30 July 2026

Competition	Played	Won	Drew	Lost	GF	GA	GD	Win%
UEFA Champions League	6	1	3	2	4	9	−5	16.67
UEFA Europa League	9	1	2	6	4	13	−9	11.11
UEFA Conference League	24	4	6	14	19	42	−23	16.67
Total	39	6	11	22	27	64	−37	15.38

Legend: GF = Goals For. GA = Goals Against. GD = Goal Difference.

Season	Competition	Round	Club	Home	Away	Aggregate
2018–19	UEFA Europa League	1Q	(Croatia) Osijek	1−1	1–2	2–3
2019–20	UEFA Europa League	1Q	(Cyprus) AEK Larnaca	0–1	0–1	0–2
2020–21	UEFA Europa League	1Q	(Serbia) TSC	0–2	—N/a	—N/a
2021–22	UEFA Europa Conference League	1Q	(North Macedonia) Sileks	1−0	1−1	2–1
2021–22	UEFA Europa Conference League	2Q	(Turkey) Sivasspor	0–1	0–1	0–2
2022–23	UEFA Europa Conference League	1Q	(Malta) Floriana	1−0	0−0	1–0
2022–23	UEFA Europa Conference League	2Q	(Albania) Laçi	0−0	4−1	4−1
2022–23	UEFA Europa Conference League	3Q	(Hungary) Fehérvár	1–2	0–5	1–7
2023–24	UEFA Europa Conference League	2Q	(Israel) Maccabi Tel Aviv	0–2	0–3	0−5
2024–25	UEFA Champions League	1Q	(Kazakhstan) Ordabasy	1−0	0−0	1−0
2024–25	UEFA Champions League	2Q	(Cyprus) APOEL	1−1	0–1	1−2
2024–25	UEFA Europa League	3Q	(Wales) The New Saints	1−0	0−0	1−0
2024–25	UEFA Europa League	PO	(Bulgaria) Ludogorets Razgrad	1–2	0–4	1−6
2024–25	UEFA Conference League	LP	(Cyprus) Pafos	1–4	—N/a	36th
2024–25	UEFA Conference League	LP	(Poland) Jagiellonia Białystok	—N/a	0–2	36th
2024–25	UEFA Conference League	LP	(Austria) Rapid Wien	0–3	—N/a	36th
2024–25	UEFA Conference League	LP	(Turkey) İstanbul Başakşehir	—N/a	1−1	36th
2024–25	UEFA Conference League	LP	(Spain) Real Betis	0–1	—N/a	36th
2024–25	UEFA Conference League	LP	(Scotland) Heart of Midlothian	—N/a	2−2	36th
2025–26	UEFA Conference League	1Q	(Malta) Birkirkara	3−0	0–1	3−1
2025–26	UEFA Conference League	2Q	(Azerbaijan) Sabah	0–2	1–4	1–6
2026–27	UEFA Champions League	1Q	(Albania) Egnatia	1−1	1–6	2–7
2026–27	UEFA Conference League	2Q	(Bosnia and Herzegovina) Borac Banja Luka	3−3	0–3	3–6
