= 2026–27 Moldovan Liga =

Liga
- Season: 2026–27
- Dates: 27 June 2026 – 22 May 2027
- Matches: 76
- Goals: 227 (2.99 per match)
- Top goalscorer: Jayder Asprilla (13 goals)
- Biggest home win: Sheriff 7–0 Bălți (20 September 2026)
- Biggest away win: Bălți 0–6 Petrocub (31 October 2026)
- All statistics correct as of 22 November 2026.

The 2026–27 Moldovan Liga is the 36th season of top-tier football in Moldova. The league started on 27 June 2026 and will conclude on 22 May 2027. Petrocub Hîncești are the defending champions. The winners of the league this season will earn a spot in the first qualifying round of the 2027–28 UEFA Champions League, the second and the third placed clubs will earn a place in the first qualifying round of the 2027–28 UEFA Conference League.

== Teams ==
=== Stadiums and locations ===
Bălți	Dacia Buiucani (Note: Dacia Buiucani are playing their home matches at the Nisporeni Stadium in Nisporeni, instead of their stadium, the ArtSport Arena in Chișinău, which did not meet requirements.)	Milsami	Petrocub
Bălți Stadium	Nisporeni Stadium; UEFA	Orhei Stadium; UEFA	Hîncești Stadium
Capacity: 5,200	Capacity: 5,200	Capacity: 3,000	Capacity: 1,633
Politehnica UTM	2026–27 Moldovan Liga is located in Moldova		Real Sireți (Note: Real Sireți are playing their home matches at the Nisporeni Stadium in Nisporeni, instead of their stadium, the Sireți Stadium in Sireți, which did not meet requirements.)
UTM Stadium	2026–27 Moldovan Liga is located in Moldova		Nisporeni Stadium (Note: Nicolae Simatoc Stadium in Lozova used as home ground in 2 matches.); UEFA
Capacity: 2,000	2026–27 Moldovan Liga is located in Moldova		Capacity: 5,200
Sheriff	2026–27 Moldovan Liga is located in Moldova		Zimbru
Sheriff Arena (Note: Sheriff small Arena used as home ground in 1 match.); UEFA	2026–27 Moldovan Liga is located in Moldova		Zimbru Stadium; UEFA
Capacity: 12,746	2026–27 Moldovan Liga is located in Moldova		Capacity: 10,104

=== Personnel and kits ===
Team	Head coach	Captain	Kit maker	Kit sponsors	
Team	Head coach	Captain	Kit maker	Main	Other(s)
Bălți	(Moldova) Alexandr Patraman (Note: Veaceslav Rusnac (matches 1–4), Alexandr Patraman (matches 5–10) (Note: Alexandr Patraman does not hold UEFA Pro Licence and led the team as an assistant coach.), Leonid Tcaci (match 11) (Note: Alexandr Patraman missed from the sideline and the fitness coach led the team.))	(Moldova) Dumitru Rogac	Joma	None	
Dacia Buiucani	(Moldova) Igor Negrescu (Note: Igor Negrescu (matches 1–3), Andrei Macari (match 4) (Note: Igor Negrescu was serving a one match suspension and the assistant coach led the team.))	(Moldova) Ștefan Efros	Macron	Primăria Chișinău	List: Front: Changan; Back: Changan, Art Sport; Sleeve: GQ Transpor, Dorna; Shorts: Premium Diagnostics
Milsami	(Moldova) Veaceslav Rusnac (Note: Alexei Savinov (matches 1–3), Serghei Dubrovin (match 4) (Note: Alexei Savinov and the assistant coach left their positions before the match and the club ambassador led the team as an assistant coach.))	(Moldova) Radu Gînsari	Macron	None	
Petrocub	(Georgia (country)) Shota Makharadze	(Moldova) Ion Jardan	Puma	Ebury	List: Front: None; Back: Hospice Angelus; Sleeves: CUN Auto Rentals, Kirka; Shorts: None
Politehnica UTM	(Moldova) Eugen Molovata	(Moldova) Alexandru Mardari	Joma	Bucovina	None
Real Sireți	(Moldova) Stanislav Luca (Note: Alexandr Bezimov (matches 1–11))	(Moldova) Ștefan Burghiu	Macron	None	List: Front: None; Back: None; Sleeve: Davo Group; Shorts: None
Sheriff	(Montenegro) Miodrag Džudović (Note: Victor Mihailov (matches 1–11))	(Mali) Bourama Fomba	Adidas	Smartclub	None
Zimbru	(Ukraine) Oleksandr Poklonskyi	(Moldova) Eugeniu Cociuc	Macron	Nova Post	List: Front: None; Back: Geosport; Sleeves: A.M.G, Apă Pură; Shorts: Vadalex agro

=== Managerial changes ===
Team	Outgoing manager	Manner of departure	Date of vacancy	Position in table	Incoming manager	Date of appointment
Zimbru	(Belarus) Oleg Kubarev	End of contract	28 May 2026	Pre-season	(Ukraine) Oleksandr Poklonskyi	5 June 2026
Milsami	(Moldova) Alexei Savinov	Resigned	17 July 2026	7th	(Moldova) Veaceslav Rusnac	23 July 2026
Bălți	(Moldova) Veaceslav Rusnac	Mutual consent	21 July 2026	7th	(Moldova) Alexandr Patraman (interim)	21 July 2026
Real Sireți	(Moldova) Alexandr Bezimov	Sacked	8 September 2026	7th	(Moldova) Stanislav Luca	9 September 2026
Sheriff	(Moldova) Victor Mihailov	Change of role	9 September 2026	2nd	(Montenegro) Miodrag Džudović	9 September 2026

== Phase I ==
Pos	Team	Pld	W	D	L	GF	GA	GD	Pts	Qualification or relegation
1	Sheriff Tiraspol (Q)	19	12	6	1	44	14	+30	42	Qualification to Phase II
2	Petrocub Hîncești (Q)	19	10	6	3	35	16	+19	36	Qualification to Phase II
3	Zimbru Chișinău (Q)	19	10	5	4	39	17	+22	35	Qualification to Phase II
4	Dacia Buiucani (Q)	19	9	3	7	29	25	+4	30	Qualification to Phase II
5	Milsami Orhei (Q)	19	6	7	6	25	25	0	25	Qualification to Phase II
6	Politehnica UTM (Q)	19	6	4	9	28	30	−2	22	Qualification to Phase II
7	Real Sireți (R)	19	2	7	10	14	30	−16	13	Relegation to Liga 1 Phase II
8	Bălți (R)	19	1	2	16	13	70	−57	5	Relegation to Liga 1 Phase II

Updated to match(es) played on 22 November 2026. Source: FMF, UEFA, Soccerway
Rules for classification: 1) Points; 2) Head-to-head points; 3) Head-to-head goal difference; 4) Head-to-head goals scored; 5) Matches won; 6) Goal difference; 7) Goals scored; 8) Least red cards; 9) Least yellow cards.
(Q) Qualified for the phase indicated; (R) Relegated

=== Results ===
For matches 1–14, each team plays every other team twice (home and away). For matches 15–21, each team plays every other team for the third time (either at home or away).

Home \ Away	BĂL	DAC	MIL	PET	POL	REA	SHE	ZIM	BĂL	DAC	MIL	PET	POL	REA	SHE	ZIM
Bălți	—	1–4	1–3	1–1	3–0	0–3	1–5	0–4	—	2–5	—	0–6	1–4	—	29 Nov	—
Dacia Buiucani	3–0	—	0–0	2–1	1–5	3–0	2–5	0–4	—	—	—	—	2–0	3–1	—	28 Nov
Milsami Orhei	2–1	0–1	—	1–0	3–3	2–2	0–1	0–0	6–1	1–0	—	—	—	28 Nov	—	1–1
Petrocub Hîncești	3–0	2–1	5–0	—	3–1	2–1	2–3	1–1	—	0–0	2–1	—	29 Nov	—	1–1	—
Politehnica UTM	6–0	2–1	1–1	0–1	—	0–0	0–0	0–2	—	—	5 Dec	—	—	—	0–2	2–1
Real Sireți	1–1	0–0	1–2	0–0	1–2	—	1–1	0–2	5 Dec	—	—	0–1	2–1	—	—	—
Sheriff Tiraspol	7–0	1–0	0–0	2–2	4–0	3–0	—	4–2	—	5 Dec	1–0	—	—	2–0	—	1–1
Zimbru Chișinău	3–0	0–1	4–2	1–2	2–1	1–1	2–1	—	4–0	—	—	5 Dec	—	4–0	—	—

Updated to match(es) played on 22 November 2026. Source: FMF, Soccerway
Legend: Blue = home team win; Yellow = draw; Red = away team win.

== Phase II ==
Points gained between the top 6 teams in Phase I are halved, rounded downwards, and no other records are carried over.
Table between qualified teams are shown in full until Phase I is completed. 15 games for each team will count for Phase II.

Pos	Team	Pld	W	D	L	GF	GA	GD	Pts	Qualification (Note: The winners of the 2026–27 Moldovan Cup also qualify for the Conference League second qualifying round. If the Moldovan Cup winners finish in the top three, the third Conference League spot will be passed to the fourth-placed team.)
1	Sheriff Tiraspol	14	8	5	1	26	12	+14	29	Qualification for the Champions League first qualifying round
2	Petrocub Hîncești	13	6	4	3	22	14	+8	22	Qualification for the Conference League first qualifying round
3	Zimbru Chișinău	13	5	4	4	21	16	+5	19	Qualification for the Conference League first qualifying round
4	Dacia Buiucani	13	4	2	7	11	21	−10	14	
5	Politehnica UTM	13	3	3	7	15	23	−8	12	
6	Milsami Orhei	14	2	6	6	10	19	−9	12	

First match(es) will be played: 6 March 2027. Source: FMF, UEFA, Soccerway
Rules for classification: 1) Points; 2) Play-off (only if deciding champion when two teams tied); 3) Head-to-head points; 4) Head-to-head goal difference; 5) Head-to-head goals scored; 6) Matches won; 7) Goal difference; 8) Goals scored; 9) Least red cards; 10) Least yellow cards.

=== Results ===
For matches 1–10, each team plays every other team twice (home and away).

Home \ Away	SHE	TM2	TM3	TM4	TM5	TM6
Sheriff Tiraspol	—					
Team 2		—				
Team 3			—			
Team 4				—		
Team 5					—	
Team 6						—

First match(es) will be played: 6 March 2027. Source: FMF, Soccerway
Legend: Blue = home team win; Yellow = draw; Red = away team win.

== Season statistics ==
=== Top goalscorers ===
As of 22 November 2026

Rank	Player	Club	Goals
1	(Colombia) Jayder Asprilla	Sheriff	13
2	(Moldova) Alexandru Bețivu	Zimbru	8
2	(Cameroon) Isidore Doumbe	Politehnica UTM	8
4	(Moldova) Nicolae Rotaru	Petrocub	6
4	(Sierra Leone) Samuel Gandi	Politehnica UTM	6
4	(Moldova) Dan Pușcaș	Petrocub	6
4	(Brazil) Matteo Amoroso	Zimbru	6
4	(Moldova) Radu Gînsari	Milsami	6
4	(Moldova) Serghei Țurcan	Dacia Buiucani	6
4	(Moldova) Vlad Lupașco	Dacia Buiucani	6

=== Hat-tricks ===
Player	For	Against	Result	Date
(Cameroon) Isidore Doumbe	Politehnica UTM	Dacia Buiucani	5–1 (A)	18 July 2026
(Moldova) Alexandru Bețivu	Zimbru	Bălți	4–0 (A)	22 August 2026
(Moldova) Vlad Lupașco^{4}	Dacia Buiucani	Bălți	5–2 (A)	22 November 2026

- ^{4} Player scored 4 goals

=== Clean sheets ===
As of 22 November 2026

Rank	Player	Club	Clean sheets
1	(Moldova) Emil Tîmbur	Sheriff	8
2	(Serbia) Ivan Dokić	Zimbru	7
2	(Moldova) Roman Dumenco	Dacia Buiucani	7
4	(Bosnia and Herzegovina) Filip Dujmović	Milsami	5
5	(Moldova) Sebastian Agachi	Real Sireți	4
5	(Moldova) Victor Dodon	Petrocub	4
7	(Moldova) Pavel Socolov	Politehnica UTM	2
7	(Moldova) Nicolae Cebotari	Sheriff	2
9	(Moldova) Artur Nazarciuc	Bălți	1
9	(Moldova) Cristian Avram	Petrocub	1
9	(Ukraine) Artem Odyntsov	Zimbru	1
9	(Moldova) Ciprian Tuhar	Dacia Buiucani	1
9	(Moldova) Silviu Șmalenea	Petrocub	1

== Awards ==
=== Phase I ===
Round	Player of the Round		Ref.
Round 1	(Moldova) Mihail Ghecev	Bălți	
Round 2	(Brazil) Marcello	Zimbru	
Round 3	(Colombia) Jayder Asprilla	Sheriff	
Round 4	(Colombia) Jayder Asprilla	Sheriff	
Round 5	(Ukraine) Artem Odyntsov	Zimbru	
Round 6	(Brazil) Sapata	Sheriff	
Round 7	(Moldova) Nicolae Rotaru	Petrocub	
Round 8	(Brazil) Caio	Zimbru	
Round 9	Undetermined (Note: Voting on Instagram among the highest-rated players from each match based on Sofascore was not conducted. Alexandru Bețivu, Samba Koné and David Sîrbu received the best Sofascore ratings.)		
Round 10	(Serbia) Ivan Dokić	Zimbru	
Round 11	(Moldova) Maxim Cojocaru	Petrocub	
Round 12	(Brazil) Jonathas	Zimbru	
Round 13	Undetermined (Note: Voting on Instagram among the highest-rated players from each match based on Sofascore was not conducted. Vladimir Fratea, Ivan Dokić and Ioan-Călin Revenco received the best Sofascore ratings.)		
Round 14	(Moldova) Dan Pușcaș	Petrocub	
Round 15	(Serbia) Ivan Dokić	Zimbru	
Round 16	(Moldova) Danila Forov	Sheriff	
Round 17	(Serbia) Ivan Dokić	Zimbru	
Round 18	(Brazil) Caio	Zimbru	
Round 19			
Round 20			
Round 21			

=== Phase II ===
Round	Player of the Round	Ref.
Round 1		
Round 2		
Round 3		
Round 4		
Round 5		
Round 6		
Round 7		
Round 8		
Round 9		
Round 10		
