= 2024–25 Moldovan Super Liga =

Super Liga
- Season: 2024–25
- Dates: 3 August 2024 – 18 May 2025
- Champions: Milsami; 2nd title
- Relegated: Florești
- Champions League: Milsami
- Europa League: Sheriff
- Conference League: Zimbru; Petrocub
- Matches: 86
- Goals: 255 (2.97 per match)
- Top goalscorer: Caio (12 goals)
- Best goalkeeper: Nicolae Cebotari (9 clean sheets)
- Biggest home win: Sheriff 8–0 Florești (9 November 2024)
- Biggest away win: Florești 0–8 Zimbru (18 August 2024)

The 2024–25 Moldovan Super Liga was the 34th season of top-tier football in Moldova. The league started on 3 August 2024 and ended on 18 May 2025. Petrocub Hîncești were the defending champions. The winners of the league this season earned a spot in the first qualifying round of the 2025–26 UEFA Champions League, the second placed club earned a spot in the first qualifying round of the 2025–26 UEFA Europa League, the third placed club earned a spot in the second qualifying round and the fourth placed club in the first qualifying round of the 2025–26 UEFA Conference League.

== Teams ==
=== Stadiums and locations ===
Bălți	Dacia Buiucani (Note: Dacia Buiucani are playing their home matches at the Zimbru-2 Stadium in Chișinău, instead of their stadium, the Joma Arena in Chișinău, which did not meet requirements.)	Florești (Note: Florești are playing their home matches in Bender, instead of their stadium in Florești, which did not meet requirements.)	Milsami
Bălți Stadium	Zimbru-2 Stadium	Bender Stadium; UEFA	District Complex; UEFA
Capacity: 5,200	Capacity: 2,000	Capacity: 4,981	Capacity: 3,000
Petrocub	2024–25 Moldovan Super Liga is located in Moldova		Sheriff
Hîncești Stadium	2024–25 Moldovan Super Liga is located in Moldova		Sheriff small Arena (Note: Sheriff Arena used as home ground in round 1 (Phase I), round 5 (Phase I), round 7 (Phase I), round 11 (Phase I), round 13 (Phase I) and round 10 (Phase II). Sheriff Indoor Arena used as home ground in round 1 (Phase II).); UEFA
Capacity: 1,100	2024–25 Moldovan Super Liga is located in Moldova		Capacity: 9,181
Spartanii Sportul (Note: Spartanii Sportul are playing their home matches in Nisporeni, instead of their stadium in Budești, which did not meet requirements.)	2024–25 Moldovan Super Liga is located in Moldova		Zimbru
Nisporeni Stadium; UEFA	2024–25 Moldovan Super Liga is located in Moldova		Zimbru Stadium; UEFA
Capacity: 5,200	2024–25 Moldovan Super Liga is located in Moldova		Capacity: 10,104

=== Personnel and kits ===
Note: Flags indicate national team as has been defined under FIFA eligibility rules. Players and managers may hold more than one non-FIFA nationality.

Team	Head coach	Captain	Kit maker	Shirt sponsor
Sheriff	(Bosnia and Herzegovina) Mislav Karoglan (Note: Yuriy Hura (match 1), Mislav Karoglan (matches 2–3), Marijan Karoglan (match 4) (Note: Mislav Karoglan was absent and the assistant coach led the team.), Mislav Karoglan (matches 5–19), Victor Mihailov (matches 20–24).)	(Moldova) Dumitru Celeadnic (Note: Dumitru Celeadnic started the match as captain thirteen times, Moussa Kyabou six times, Cyrille Bayala four times, and Rasheed Akanbi once.)	Adidas	none
Zimbru	(Turkey) Hikmet Karaman (Note: Lilian Popescu (matches 1–9), Dumitru Arabadji (match 10) (Note: Lilian Popescu left his position before the match and the assistant coach led the team.), Hikmet Karaman (matches 11–20), Ömer Karaman (match 21) (Note: Hikmet Karaman was serving a one match suspension and the assistant coach led the team.), Hikmet Karaman (matches 22–24).)	(Moldova) Ștefan Burghiu (Note: Ștefan Burghiu started the match as captain twenty times, and Denys Dedechko four times.)	Macron	ProPay, Geosport, A.M.G, apă pură
Petrocub	(Moldova) Andrei Martin (Note: Andrei Martin (matches 1–14), Eduard Blănuță (matches 15–18), Slavche Vojneski (matches 19–20), Andrei Prepeliță (matches 21–24). (Note: Andrei Prepeliță does not hold UEFA Pro Licence and led the team as an assistant coach.))	(Moldova) Vladimir Ambros (Note: Vladimir Ambros started the match as captain thirteen times, Ion Jardan nine times, and Victor Mudrac twice.)	Puma	none
Bălți	(Moldova) Veaceslav Rusnac (Note: Veaceslav Rusnac (matches 1–18), Alexandr Patraman (matches 19–20) (Note: Veaceslav Rusnac was serving a two match suspension and the assistant coach led the team.), Veaceslav Rusnac (matches 21–24).)	(Argentina) Álvaro Bely (Note: Álvaro Bely started the match as captain twenty-three times, and André Silva once.)	Joma	Primăria Municipiului Bălți
Milsami	(Moldova) Igor Picușceac	(Moldova) Radu Gînsari (Note: Radu Gînsari started the match as captain fifteen times, Vadim Bolohan seven times, and Danny Lupano twice.)	Macron	none
Spartanii Sportul	(Moldova) Adrian Sosnovschi (Note: Adrian Sosnovschi (matches 1–7), Valentin Furdui (match 8) (Note: Adrian Sosnovschi was absent and the assistant coach led the team.), Adrian Sosnovschi (matches 9–12), Andrian Bogdan (matches 13–14) (Note: Adrian Sosnovschi and the assistant coach left their positions before the match and the goalkeeping coach led the team.), Viorel Cojocaru (matches 15–19) (Note: Igor Ursachi was absent and the assistant coach led the team.), Igor Ursachi (matches 20–24).)	(Moldova) Alexandru Dedov (Note: Alexandru Dedov started the match as captain ten times, Daniel Vîrlan seven times, Ilie Damașcan four times, Pavel Nazari once, Jorge Ocante once, and Nicolae Rotaru once.)	Erreà	Ceek, Samaritan
Dacia Buiucani	(Moldova) Viorel Frunză	(Moldova) Maxim Focșa (Note: Maxim Focșa started the match as captain thirteen times, and Ștefan Efros once.)	Joma	Primăria Chișinău, Art Sport, OM, Creatlon
Florești	(Moldova) Nicolai Țurcan (Note: Igor Ursachi (matches 1–6), Nicolai Țurcan (matches 7–14) (Note: Nicolai Țurcan does not hold UEFA Pro Licence and led the team as an assistant coach.).)	(Moldova) Alexandru Osipov (Note: Alexandru Osipov started the match as captain twelve times, and Oleg Gavriușen once.)	Joma	none

=== Managerial changes ===
Team	Outgoing manager	Manner of departure	Date of vacancy	Position in table	Incoming manager	Date of appointment
Sheriff	(Ukraine) Yuriy Hura	Mutual consent	5 August 2024	2nd	(Bosnia and Herzegovina) Mislav Karoglan	5 August 2024
Florești	(Moldova) Igor Ursachi	Resigned	21 September 2024	8th	(Moldova) Nicolai Țurcan	21 September 2024
Zimbru	(Moldova) Lilian Popescu	Mutual consent	8 October 2024	4th	(Turkey) Hikmet Karaman	18 October 2024
Spartanii	(Moldova) Adrian Sosnovschi	Resigned	9 November 2024	6th	(Moldova) Igor Ursachi	15 January 2025
Petrocub	(Moldova) Andrei Martin	Signed by Ordabasy	22 December 2024	3rd	(Italy) Giovanni Costantino	1 January 2025
Petrocub	(Italy) Giovanni Costantino	Mutual consent	25 January 2025	3rd	(Moldova) Eduard Blănuță	27 January 2025
Petrocub	(Moldova) Eduard Blănuță	Mutual consent	11 April 2025	4th	(North Macedonia) Slavche Vojneski	11 April 2025
Sheriff	(Bosnia and Herzegovina) Mislav Karoglan	Mutual consent	15 April 2025	3rd	(Moldova) Victor Mihailov	15 April 2025
Petrocub	(North Macedonia) Slavche Vojneski	Resigned	19 April 2025	4th	(Romania) Andrei Prepeliță	25 April 2025

== Phase I ==
Pos	Team	Pld	W	D	L	GF	GA	GD	Pts	Qualification or relegation
1	Sheriff Tiraspol	14	11	3	0	33	6	+27	36	Qualification to Phase II
2	Zimbru Chișinău	14	8	1	5	32	16	+16	25	Qualification to Phase II
3	Petrocub Hîncești	14	6	5	3	20	9	+11	23 (Note: Goal difference: Petrocub : +11, Bălți : +9.)	Qualification to Phase II
4	Bălți	14	6	5	3	18	9	+9	23	Qualification to Phase II
5	Milsami Orhei	14	6	3	5	30	18	+12	21	Qualification to Phase II
6	Spartanii Sportul	14	3	5	6	12	17	−5	14	Qualification to Phase II
7	Dacia Buiucani	14	2	5	7	8	19	−11	11	Relegation to Liga 1 Phase II
8	Florești	14	0	1	13	0	59	−59	1	Relegation to Liga 1 Phase II

Source: FMF, UEFA, Soccerway
Rules for classification: 1) Points; 2) Head-to-head points; 3) Head-to-head goal difference; 4) Head-to-head goals scored; 5) Matches won; 6) Goal difference; 7) Goals scored; 8) Least red cards; 9) Least yellow cards.

=== Results ===
For matches 1–14, each team plays every other team twice (once home, once away).

Home \ Away	BĂL	DAC	FLO	MIL	PET	SHE	SPA	ZIM
Bălți	—	0–0	5–0	0–0	2–1	0–0	1–0	2–0
Dacia Buiucani	1–1	—	2–0	1–1	0–0	1–3	0–1	0–1
Florești	0–4	0–3	—	0–5	0–5	0–4	0–0	0–8
Milsami Orhei	0–2	7–0	6–0	—	0–2	0–4	3–0	3–1
Petrocub Hîncești	1–0	2–0	3–0 (Note: Florești was awarded a technical loss against Petrocub due to their failure to appear at their round 2 match.)	2–1	—	1–1	2–2	0–0
Sheriff Tiraspol	1–0	2–0	8–0	1–1	1–0	—	1–0	4–2
Spartanii Sportul	1–1	0–0	2–0	1–2	1–1	0–1	—	1–3
Zimbru Chișinău	4–0	1–0	4–0	4–1	1–0	1–2	2–3	—

Source: FMF, Soccerway
Legend: Blue = home team win; Yellow = draw; Red = away team win.

== Phase II ==
Pos	Team	Pld	W	D	L	GF	GA	GD	Pts	Qualification
1	Milsami Orhei (C)	10	6	3	1	25	8	+17	21	Qualification for the Champions League first qualifying round
2	Sheriff Tiraspol	10	5	5	0	17	6	+11	20 (Note: Head-to-head points: Sheriff : 8, Zimbru : 2.)	Qualification for the Europa League first qualifying round (Note: Sheriff Tiraspol qualified for the Europa League first qualifying round as the 2024–25 Moldovan Cup winners.)
3	Zimbru Chișinău	10	6	2	2	22	9	+13	20	Qualification for the Conference League second qualifying round
4	Petrocub Hîncești	10	4	2	4	20	17	+3	14	Qualification for the Conference League first qualifying round
5	Bălți	10	1	2	7	9	24	−15	5	
6	Spartanii Sportul	10	0	2	8	9	38	−29	2	

Source: FMF, UEFA, Soccerway
Rules for classification: 1) Points; 2) Play-off (only if deciding champion when two teams tied); 3) Head-to-head points; 4) Head-to-head goal difference; 5) Head-to-head goals scored; 6) Matches won; 7) Goal difference; 8) Goals scored; 9) Least red cards; 10) Least yellow cards.
(C) Champions

=== Results ===
For matches 1–10, each team plays every other team twice. Sheriff will play (7 at home and 3 away), Zimbru (6 at home and 4 away), Petrocub and Bălți (5 at home and 5 away), Milsami (4 at home and 6 away), Spartanii Sportul (3 at home and 7 away).

Home \ Away	SHE	ZIM	PET	BĂL	MIL	SPA	SHE	ZIM	PET	BĂL	MIL	SPA
Sheriff Tiraspol	—	0–0	3–1	2–1	2–2	3–0	—	—	—	—	0–0	4–0
Zimbru Chișinău	1–1	—	3–2	3–1	1–2	3–1	—	—	—	—	—	6–0
Petrocub Hîncești	1–1	0–3	—	3–0	2–0	3–1	—	—	—	—	—	—
Bălți	0–1	0–2	1–1	—	0–2	3–3	—	—	—	—	—	—
Milsami Orhei	—	2–0	5–1	5–0	—	1–1	—	—	—	—	—	—
Spartanii Sportul	—	—	0–6	2–3	1–6	—	—	—	—	—	—	—

Source: FMF, Soccerway
Legend: Blue = home team win; Yellow = draw; Red = away team win.

== Season statistics ==
=== Top goalscorers ===
Rank	Player	Club	Goals
1	(Brazil) Caio	Bălți	12
2	(Ghana) Isaac Oppong	Spartanii Sportul	9
2	(Moldova) Radu Gînsari	Milsami	9
4	(Nigeria) Justice Ohajunwa	Zimbru	8
4	(Moldova) Vlad Răileanu	Zimbru	8
6	(Nigeria) Rasheed Akanbi	Sheriff	7
6	(Moldova) Ștefan Bîtca	Zimbru	7
8	(Cape Verde) João Paulino	Zimbru	6
8	(Mauritania) Ndiaga Yade	Sheriff	6
8	(Georgia (country)) Vladimer Mamuchashvili	Sheriff	6

=== Hat-tricks ===
Player	For	Against	Result	Date
(Nigeria) Justice Ohajunwa^{4}	Zimbru	Florești	8–0 (A)	18 August 2024
(Ghana) Isaac Oppong	Spartanii Sportul	Zimbru	3–2 (A)	14 September 2024
(Georgia (country)) Vladimer Mamuchashvili	Sheriff	Dacia Buiucani	3–1 (A)	29 September 2024
(Nigeria) Stephen Gopey	Milsami	Florești	5–0 (A)	26 October 2024
(Nigeria) Rasheed Akanbi	Sheriff	Florești	8–0 (H)	9 November 2024
(Brazil) Caio	Bălți	Spartanii Sportul	3–3 (H)	26 April 2025
(Ukraine) Oleksiy Shchebetun	Zimbru	Spartanii Sportul	6–0 (H)	4 May 2025

- ^{4} Player scored 4 goals

=== Clean sheets ===
Rank	Player	Club	Clean sheets
1	(Moldova) Nicolae Cebotari	Zimbru	9
2	(Moldova) Dumitru Celeadnic	Sheriff	8
2	(Moldova) Victor Străistari	Sheriff (3) & Dacia Buiucani (5)	8
4	(Moldova) Artur Nazarciuc	Bălți	7
5	(Moldova) Silviu Șmalenea	Petrocub	6
6	(Moldova) Emil Tîmbur	Milsami	4
6	(Moldova) Mihail Cioban	Milsami	4
8	(Moldova) Victor Dodon	Petrocub	3
9	(Moldova) Sebastian Agachi	Zimbru	2
9	(Slovenia) Emil Velić	Sheriff	2
9	(Ghana) Andrews Owusu	Spartanii Sportul	2
9	(Moldova) Daniel Vîrlan	Spartanii Sportul	2

=== Discipline ===
==== Player ====
- Most yellow cards: 12
  - (Moldova) Teodor Lungu (Petrocub)
- Most red cards: 2
  - (Moldova) Nichita Picus (Bălți)

==== Club ====
- Most yellow cards: 54
  - Petrocub
- Fewest yellow cards: 11
  - Florești
- Most red cards: 6
  - Bălți
- Fewest red cards: 0
  - Florești
  - Sheriff
  - Zimbru
