= 2025–26 Moldovan Liga =

Liga
- Season: 2025–26
- Dates: 21 June 2025 – 17 May 2026
- Champions: Petrocub; 2nd title
- Relegated: Spartanii Sportul
- Champions League: Petrocub
- Europa League: Sheriff
- Conference League: Zimbru; Milsami
- Matches: 114
- Goals: 336 (2.95 per match)
- Top goalscorer: Dzianis Kazlouski (20 goals)
- Best goalkeeper: Silviu Șmalenea; Emil Tîmbur (10 clean sheets each)
- Biggest home win: Zimbru 7–0 Politehnica UTM (3 August 2025)
- Biggest away win: Spartanii Sportul 0–8 Petrocub (30 November 2025)

The 2025–26 Moldovan Liga was the 35th season of top-tier football in Moldova. The league started on 21 June 2025 and ended on 17 May 2026. Milsami Orhei were the defending champions. The winners of the league this season earned a spot in the first qualifying round of the 2026–27 UEFA Champions League, the second placed club earned a spot in the first qualifying round of the 2026–27 UEFA Europa League, the third placed club earned a spot in the second qualifying round and the fourth placed club in the first qualifying round of the 2026–27 UEFA Conference League.

== Teams ==
=== Stadiums and locations ===
Bălți	Dacia Buiucani (Note: Dacia Buiucani are playing their home matches at the Nisporeni Stadium in Nisporeni, instead of their stadium, the Joma Arena in Chișinău, which did not meet requirements.)	Milsami	Petrocub
Bălți Stadium	Nisporeni Stadium; UEFA	District Complex; UEFA	Hîncești Stadium
Capacity: 5,200	Capacity: 5,200	Capacity: 3,000	Capacity: 1,633
Politehnica UTM (Note: Politehnica UTM are playing their home matches at the Suruceni Stadium in Suruceni, instead of their stadium, the UTM Stadium in Chișinău, which did not meet requirements.)	2025–26 Moldovan Liga is located in Moldova		Sheriff
Suruceni Stadium	2025–26 Moldovan Liga is located in Moldova		Sheriff small Arena (Note: Sheriff Arena used as home ground in round 6 (Phase I), round 8 (Phase I) and round 10 (Phase I). Sheriff Indoor Arena used as home ground in round 2 (Phase II) and round 3 (Phase II).); UEFA
Capacity: 350	2025–26 Moldovan Liga is located in Moldova		Capacity: 9,181
Spartanii Sportul (Note: Spartanii Sportul are playing their home matches at the Suruceni Stadium in Suruceni, instead of their stadium in Selemet, and until round 10 in Budești, which did not meet requirements.)	2025–26 Moldovan Liga is located in Moldova		Zimbru
Suruceni Stadium	2025–26 Moldovan Liga is located in Moldova		Zimbru Stadium (Note: CPTF Stadium used as home ground in round 2 (Phase II).); UEFA
Capacity: 350	2025–26 Moldovan Liga is located in Moldova		Capacity: 10,104

=== Personnel and kits ===
Team	Head coach	Captain	Kit maker	Kit sponsors	
Team	Head coach	Captain	Kit maker	Main	Other(s)
Bălți	(Moldova) Veaceslav Rusnac (Note: Veaceslav Rusnac (matches 1–21), Alexandr Patraman (matches 22–23) (Note: Veaceslav Rusnac was serving a two match suspension and the assistant coach led the team.), Veaceslav Rusnac (matches 24–31).)	(Argentina) Álvaro Bely (Note: Álvaro Bely started the match as captain twenty-eight times, and Andrei Rusnac three times.)	Joma	None	
Dacia Buiucani	(Moldova) Viorel Frunză (Note: Viorel Frunză (matches 1–17), Cristian Cîrlan (matches 18–19) (Note: Viorel Frunză was serving a two match suspension and the assistant coach led the team.), Viorel Frunză (matches 20–21), Igor Negrescu (matches 22–31).)	(Moldova) Maxim Focșa (Note: Maxim Focșa started the match as captain twenty-one times, Ștefan Efros nine times, and Igor Lambarschi once.)	Joma	Primăria Chișinău	List: Back: Art Sport, BYD Horizon Auto; Sleeves: OM, Intact Asigurări; Shorts: Creatlon
Milsami	(Moldova) Igor Picușceac (Note: Igor Picușceac (matches 1–21), Vladimir Gudev (matches 22–27), Alexei Savinov (matches 28–31).)	(Bosnia and Herzegovina) Filip Dujmović (Note: Filip Dujmović started the match as captain ten times, Emil Tîmbur nine times, Vasile Jardan six times, Radu Gînsari four times, Danny Lupano once, and Abdoul Yoda once.)	Macron	None	
Petrocub	(Georgia (country)) Shota Makharadze	(Moldova) Vladimir Ambros (Note: Vladimir Ambros started the match as captain sixteen times, Ion Jardan thirteen times, Maxim Potîrniche once, and Sergiu Plătică once.)	Puma	Ebury	List: Back: None; Sleeve: CUN Auto Rentals; Shorts: None
Sheriff	(Moldova) Victor Mihailov (Note: Victor Mihailov (matches 1–11), Vadim Skripchenko (matches 12–18), Victor Mihailov (matches 19–31).)	(Burkina Faso) Cyrille Bayala (Note: Cyrille Bayala started the match as captain seventeen times, and Peter Ademo fourteen times.)	Adidas	None	
Zimbru	(Belarus) Oleg Kubarev	(Moldova) Mihail Ștefan (Note: Mihail Ștefan started the match as captain twenty-two times, Ștefan Burghiu six times, and Nicolae Cebotari three times.)	Macron	Nova Post, ProPay	List: Back: Geosport; Sleeves: A.M.G, apă pură; Shorts: Vadalex agro
Politehnica UTM	(Belarus) Vitali Rashkevich (Note: Ilie Pinteac (matches 1–6), Vitali Rashkevich (matches 7–21).)	(Moldova) Alexandru Mardari (Note: Alexandru Mardari started the match as captain eighteen times, Ovidiu David once, Artiom Dijinari once, and Cristian Gonța once.)	Joma	None	
Spartanii Sportul	(Moldova) Igor Ursachi (Note: Igor Ursachi (matches 1–10), Adrian Sosnovschi (matches 11–16), Igor Ursachi (matches 17–18) (Note: Adrian Sosnovschi was serving a two match suspension and the assistant coach led the team.), Adrian Sosnovschi (matches 19–21).)	(Moldova) Dan Spătaru (Note: Dan Spătaru started the match as captain seven times, Petru Leuca five times, Daniel Vîrlan four times, Leonardo Bulmaga three times, and Pavel Nazari twice.)	Macron (Note: Joma (match 11).)	None	

=== Managerial changes ===
Team	Outgoing manager	Manner of departure	Date of vacancy	Position in table	Incoming manager	Date of appointment
Petrocub	(Romania) Andrei Prepeliță	Mutual consent	22 May 2025	Pre-season	(Georgia (country)) Shota Makharadze	1 June 2025
Zimbru	(Turkey) Hikmet Karaman	Mutual consent	5 June 2025	Pre-season	(Belarus) Oleg Kubarev	8 June 2025
Politehnica UTM	(Moldova) Ilie Pinteac	Change of role	31 July 2025	7th	(Belarus) Vitali Rashkevich	31 July 2025
Spartanii Sportul	(Moldova) Igor Ursachi	Change of role	29 August 2025	7th	(Moldova) Adrian Sosnovschi	29 August 2025
Sheriff	(Moldova) Victor Mihailov	Change of role	3 September 2025	1st	(Belarus) Vadim Skripchenko	3 September 2025
Sheriff	(Belarus) Vadim Skripchenko	Mutual consent	5 November 2025	2nd	(Moldova) Victor Mihailov	5 November 2025
Dacia Buiucani	(Moldova) Viorel Frunză	Mutual consent	5 December 2025	6th	(Moldova) Igor Negrescu	12 January 2026
Milsami	(Moldova) Igor Picușceac	Mutual consent	21 January 2026	4th	(Moldova) Vladimir Gudev	29 January 2026
Milsami	(Moldova) Vladimir Gudev	Resigned	18 April 2026	4th	(Moldova) Alexei Savinov	24 April 2026

== Phase I ==
Pos	Team	Pld	W	D	L	GF	GA	GD	Pts	Qualification or relegation
1	Petrocub Hîncești	21	14	6	1	44	14	+30	48	Qualification to Phase II
2	Zimbru Chișinău	21	13	5	3	52	21	+31	44	Qualification to Phase II
3	Sheriff Tiraspol	21	13	2	6	43	17	+26	41	Qualification to Phase II
4	Milsami Orhei	21	11	4	6	42	25	+17	37	Qualification to Phase II
5	Bălți	21	8	5	8	27	29	−2	29	Qualification to Phase II
6	Dacia Buiucani	21	4	3	14	24	39	−15	15	Qualification to Phase II
7	Politehnica UTM	21	4	1	16	24	61	−37	13	Relegation to Liga 1 Phase II
8	Spartanii Sportul	21	3	2	16	13	63	−50	11	Relegation to Liga 1 Phase II

Source: FMF, UEFA, Soccerway
Rules for classification: 1) Points; 2) Head-to-head points; 3) Head-to-head goal difference; 4) Head-to-head goals scored; 5) Matches won; 6) Goal difference; 7) Goals scored; 8) Least red cards; 9) Least yellow cards.

=== Results ===
For matches 1–14, each team plays every other team twice (home and away). For matches 15–21, each team plays every other team for the third time (either at home or away).

Home \ Away	BĂL	DAC	MIL	PET	POL	SHE	SPA	ZIM	BĂL	DAC	MIL	PET	POL	SHE	SPA	ZIM
Bălți	—	0–0	3–3	0–1	3–2	0–3	4–1	1–1	—	2–0	2–1	—	—	—	—	1–3
Dacia Buiucani	2–3	—	1–2	0–2	4–1	0–2	5–1	0–3	—	—	0–2	—	—	0–4	0–1	2–2
Milsami Orhei	2–1	3–2	—	1–1	4–1	1–2	3–1	3–0	—	—	—	1–2	—	1–0	0–0	0–3
Petrocub Hîncești	1–1	2–1	2–1	—	2–1	0–0	2–0	2–1	0–0	3–1	—	—	4–1	4–2	—	—
Politehnica UTM	0–1	2–3	0–3	0–5	—	0–4	4–1	2–3	3–1	2–1	0–5	—	—	1–2	—	—
Sheriff Tiraspol	1–0	1–0	1–1	2–0	3–0	—	5–1	2–3	1–2	—	—	—	—	—	5–0	0–1
Spartanii Sportul	0–2	0–1	1–4	0–2	0–0	0–3	—	0–6	2–0	—	—	0–8	1–2	—	—	—
Zimbru Chișinău	2–0	1–1	2–1	1–1	7–0	2–0	5–0	—	—	—	—	0–0	4–2	—	2–3	—

Source: FMF, Soccerway
Legend: Blue = home team win; Yellow = draw; Red = away team win.

== Phase II ==
Points gained between the top 6 teams in Phase I are halved, rounded downwards, and no other records are carried over. (Note: Petrocub started with 15 points, Zimbru with 14, Sheriff with 11, Milsami with 10, Bălți with 8, Dacia Buiucani with 1.)

Pos	Team	Pld	W	D	L	GF	GA	GD	Pts	Qualification
1	Petrocub Hîncești (C)	10	8	1	1	20	3	+17	40	Qualification for the Champions League first qualifying round
2	Sheriff Tiraspol	10	7	2	1	14	5	+9	34	Qualification for the Europa League first qualifying round (Note: Sheriff Tiraspol qualified for the Europa League first qualifying round as the 2025–26 Moldovan Cup winners.)
3	Zimbru Chișinău	10	5	3	2	18	11	+7	32	Qualification for the Conference League second qualifying round
4	Milsami Orhei	10	2	3	5	5	13	−8	19	Qualification for the Conference League first qualifying round
5	Bălți	10	2	2	6	4	15	−11	16	
6	Dacia Buiucani	10	0	1	9	6	20	−14	2	

Source: FMF, UEFA, Soccerway
Rules for classification: 1) Points; 2) Play-off (only if deciding champion when two teams tied); 3) Head-to-head points; 4) Head-to-head goal difference; 5) Head-to-head goals scored; 6) Matches won; 7) Goal difference; 8) Goals scored; 9) Least red cards; 10) Least yellow cards.
(C) Champions

=== Results ===
For matches 1–10, each team plays every other team twice (home and away).

Home \ Away	PET	ZIM	SHE	MIL	BĂL	DAC
Petrocub Hîncești	—	3–0	1–0	2–0	3–0	3–0
Zimbru Chișinău	1–1	—	2–2	3–1	4–1	3–2
Sheriff Tiraspol	1–0	1–0	—	3–1	2–0	2–0
Milsami Orhei	0–3	0–0	0–0	—	0–0	1–0
Bălți	0–2	0–2	0–1	1–0	—	0–0
Dacia Buiucani	1–2	0–3	1–2	1–2	1–2	—

Source: FMF, Soccerway
Legend: Blue = home team win; Yellow = draw; Red = away team win.

== Season statistics ==
=== Top goalscorers ===
Rank	Player	Club	Goals
1	(Belarus) Dzianis Kazlouski	Zimbru	20
2	(Moldova) Petru Popescu	Petrocub	15
3	(Moldova) Andrei Cobeț	Milsami	9
3	(Brazil) Zé Flores	Sheriff (2) & Bălți (7)	9
3	(Moldova) Ion Jardan	Petrocub	9
6	(Albania) Amarildo Gjoni	Sheriff	8
6	(Moldova) Vladimir Fratea	Zimbru	8
8	(Moldova) Vladimir Ambros	Petrocub	7
8	(Moldova) Marin Căruntu	Bălți (1) & Dacia Buiucani (6)	7
10	(Mauritania) Ndiaga Yade	Sheriff	6
10	(Colombia) Jayder Asprilla	Sheriff	6
10	(Moldova) Mihai Lupan	Petrocub	6
10	(Mali) Sibiry Keita	Milsami	6
10	(Sierra Leone) Samuel Gandi	Politehnica UTM	6
10	(Moldova) Vlad Lupașco	Dacia Buiucani	6
10	(Moldova) Victor Bogaciuc	Petrocub	6

=== Hat-tricks ===
Player	For	Against	Result	Date
(Moldova) Marin Căruntu^{4}	Dacia Buiucani	Spartanii Sportul	5–1 (H)	21 June 2025
(Israel) Guy Dahan	Zimbru	Spartanii Sportul	6–0 (A)	13 July 2025
(Mauritania) Ndiaga Yade	Sheriff	Spartanii Sportul	5–0 (H)	19 October 2025
(Belarus) Dzianis Kazlouski	Zimbru	Bălți	3–1 (A)	9 November 2025
(Moldova) Ion Jardan	Petrocub	Spartanii Sportul	8–0 (A)	30 November 2025
(Colombia) Jayder Asprilla	Sheriff	Milsami	3–1 (H)	11 April 2026

- ^{4} Player scored 4 goals

=== Clean sheets ===
Rank	Player	Club	Clean sheets
1	(Moldova) Silviu Șmalenea	Petrocub	10
1	(Moldova) Emil Tîmbur	Sheriff (6) & Milsami (4)	10
3	(Moldova) Artur Nazarciuc	Bălți	8
4	(Serbia) Ivan Dokić	Zimbru	7
5	(Moldova) Victor Străistari	Sheriff	6
5	(Moldova) Victor Dodon	Petrocub	6
5	(Bosnia and Herzegovina) Filip Dujmović	Milsami	6
8	(Bulgaria) Ivan Dyulgerov	Sheriff	5
9	(Moldova) Daniel Vîrlan	Spartanii Sportul	4
10	(Moldova) Sebastian Agachi	Zimbru	3

=== Discipline ===
==== Player ====
- Most yellow cards: 12
  - (Moldova) Vladislav Boico (Bălți)
- Most red cards: 2
  - (Nigeria) Christopher Nwaeze (Milsami)
  - (Moldova) Vladislav Boico (Bălți)

==== Club ====
- Most yellow cards: 82
  - Milsami
  - Bălți
- Fewest yellow cards: 48
  - Spartanii Sportul
- Most red cards: 6
  - Politehnica UTM
  - Bălți
- Fewest red cards: 1
  - Spartanii Sportul
  - Sheriff

== Awards ==
=== Phase I ===
Round	Player of the Round		Ref.
Round 1	(Moldova) Emil Tîmbur	Milsami	
Round 2	(Angola) Bruno Paz	Zimbru	
Round 3	(Moldova) Dan Boțan	Bălți	
Round 4	(Israel) Guy Dahan	Zimbru	
Round 5	(Portugal) Diogo Rodrigues	Zimbru	
Round 6	(Moldova) Victor Stînă	Zimbru	
Round 7	Undetermined (Note: Voting on Instagram among the highest-rated players from each match based on Sofascore was not conducted. Roman Grygoryan, Tsimafei Sharkouski, Nabil Khali and Ilie Botnari received the best Sofascore ratings.)		
Round 8	(Moldova) Emil Tîmbur	Milsami	
Round 9	(Brazil) Zé Flores	Bălți	
Round 10	(Moldova) Vladislav Costin	Bălți	
Round 11	(Moldova) Vladimir Fratea	Zimbru	
Round 12	(Moldova) Daniel Cucer	Politehnica UTM	
Round 13	(Serbia) Ivan Dokić	Zimbru	
Round 14	(Brazil) Matteo Amoroso	Zimbru	
Round 15	(Brazil) Caio Dantas	Zimbru	
Round 16	(Bosnia and Herzegovina) Filip Dujmović	Milsami	
Round 17	(Moldova) Emil Tîmbur	Milsami	
Round 18	(Moldova) Artur Sprinsean	Politehnica UTM	
Round 19	(Moldova) Vladimir Ambros	Petrocub	
Round 20	(Netherlands) Dehninio Muringen	Milsami	
Round 21	(Moldova) Danila Forov	Sheriff	

=== Phase II ===
Round	Player of the Round		Ref.
Round 1	(Senegal) Baye Assane Ciss	Sheriff	
Round 2	(Brazil) Welington Taira	Bălți	
Round 3	(Senegal) Baye Assane Ciss	Sheriff	
Round 4	(Belarus) Dzianis Kazlouski	Zimbru	
Round 5	(Colombia) Jayder Asprilla	Sheriff	
Round 6	(Belarus) Dzianis Kazlouski	Zimbru	
Round 7	(Moldova) Cătălin Cucoș	Petrocub	
Round 8	(Moldova) Cătălin Cucoș	Petrocub	
Round 9	(Moldova) Dan Pușcaș	Petrocub	
Round 10	(Moldova) Ciprian Tuhar	Dacia Buiucani	
