= 2018 Moldovan National Division =

Season of the Moldovan National League

Divizia Națională
- Season: 2018
- Dates: 1 April 2018 – 24 November 2018
- Champions: Sheriff; 17th title
- Relegated: Zaria
- Champions League: Sheriff
- Europa League: Milsami; Petrocub; Speranța
- Matches: 112
- Goals: 269 (2.4 per match)
- Top goalscorer: Vladimir Ambros (12 goals)
- Best goalkeeper: Serghei Pașcenco (11 clean sheets)
- Biggest home win: Sheriff 4–0 Sf. Gheorghe (16 June 2018); Sheriff 5–1 Zaria (1 July 2018); Milsami 4–0 Dinamo-Auto (1 July 2018)
- Biggest away win: Dinamo-Auto 0–5 Sheriff (10 June 2018)
- Highest scoring: Sf. Gheorghe 3–6 Petrocub (14 April 2018)
- Longest winning run: 6 matches Sheriff
- Longest unbeaten run: 11 matches Sheriff
- Longest winless run: 12 matches Dinamo-Auto
- Longest losing run: 6 matches Dinamo-Auto
- Highest attendance: 5,500; Zimbru 0–0 Petrocub (22 September 2018)
- Lowest attendance: 50; Dinamo-Auto 0–0 Sf. Gheorghe (20 May 2018); Dinamo-Auto 1–2 Speranța (27 June 2018); Dinamo-Auto 3–0 Zimbru (1 September 2018); Dinamo-Auto 1–0 Milsami (22 September 2018); Zaria 1–1 Sf. Gheorghe (10 November 2018)
- Total attendance: 91,220
- Average attendance: 814

The 2018 Moldovan National Division (Romanian: Divizia Națională) was the 28th season of top-tier football in Moldova. The season started on 1 April 2018 and ended on 24 November 2018. Fixtures were announced on 19 March 2018. Sheriff Tiraspol were the defending champions. The winners of the league this season earned a spot in the first qualifying round of the 2019–20 UEFA Champions League, and the second, third and fourth placed clubs earned a place in the first qualifying round of the 2019–20 UEFA Europa League.

== Teams ==
Location of teams in 2018 Divizia Națională

=== Number of teams by region ===
Region	Number of teams	Club(s)
Transnistria	2	Dinamo-Auto and Sheriff
Bălți	1	Zaria
Chișinău	1	Zimbru
Hîncești	1	Petrocub-Hîncești
Ialoveni	1	Sfîntul Gheorghe
Nisporeni	1	Speranța
Orhei	1	Milsami

=== Stadia and locations ===
Club	Location	Stadium	Capacity
Dinamo-Auto	Tiraspol	Dinamo-Auto Stadium, Tîrnauca	1,300
Milsami	Orhei	Complexul Sportiv Raional	3,000
Petrocub-Hîncești	Sărata-Galbenă	Stadionul Municipal, Hîncești	1,000
Sfîntul Gheorghe	Suruceni	Suruceni Stadium	1,500
Sheriff	Tiraspol	Sheriff Stadium	12,726
Speranța	Nisporeni	Complexul Sportiv Raional, Orhei	3,000
Zaria	Bălți	Stadionul Orășenesc	7,000
Zimbru	Chișinău	Zimbru Stadium	10,400

=== Personnel and kits ===
Team	Head coach	Captain	Kit manufacturer	Shirt sponsor
Dinamo-Auto	(Russia) Igor Dobrovolski	(Moldova) Vitalie Bordian	Joma	OM
Milsami	(Moldova) Veaceslav Rusnac	(Moldova) Andrei Cojocari	Kelme	Dufremol, Avia Invest, Moldclassica
Petrocub-Hîncești	(Moldova) Lilian Popescu	(Moldova) Vladimir Ambros	Joma	CUN Auto Rentals, MAIB
Sfîntul Gheorghe	(Moldova) Serghei Cebotari	(Moldova) Vitalie Plămădeală	Macron	Niagara fitness club, Craft Meat
Sheriff	(Croatia) Goran Sablić	(Bosnia and Herzegovina) Mateo Sušić	Adidas	IDC
Speranța	(Moldova) Cristian Efros	(Moldova) Ștefan Efros	Nike	Orom Imexpo, Mticket.md
Zaria	(Moldova) Vlad Goian	(Moldova) Vladimir Livșiț	Joma	Fundația Renato Usatîi, Bălți, OM
Zimbru	(Romania) Sorin Colceag	(Moldova) Ion Jardan	Joma	Chateau Vartely, amg-holding.md

=== Managerial changes ===
Team	Outgoing manager	Manner of departure	Date of vacancy	Position in table	Replaced by	Date of appointment
Dinamo-Auto	(Moldova) Veaceslav Semionov	End of caretaker spell	End of 2017 season	Pre-season	(Moldova) Viorel Frunză	20 January 2018
Zimbru	(Moldova) Iurie Osipenco	Sacked	End of 2017 season	Pre-season	(Moldova) Vladimir Aga	23 February 2018
Zaria	(Romania) Ștefan Stoica	Sacked	13 December 2017	Pre-season	(Moldova) Vlad Goian	5 February 2018
Dinamo-Auto	(Moldova) Viorel Frunză	Demoted to assistant coach	19 March 2018	Pre-season	(Russia) Igor Dobrovolski	19 March 2018
Sfîntul Gheorghe	(Moldova) Serghei Secu	Resigned	15 April 2018	8th	(Moldova) Serghei Cebotari	15 April 2018
Sheriff	(Italy) Roberto Bordin	Resigned	24 April 2018	1st	(Moldova) Victor Mihailov (interim)	24 April 2018
Sheriff	(Moldova) Victor Mihailov	End of caretaker spell	7 June 2018	1st	(Croatia) Goran Sablić	7 June 2018
Zimbru	(Moldova) Vladimir Aga	Removed from position	12 June 2018	7th	(Moldova) Serghei Secu	12 June 2018
Zimbru	(Moldova) Serghei Secu	Sacked	1 August 2018	5th	(Romania) Sorin Colceag	1 August 2018
Zaria	(Moldova) Vlad Goian	Sacked	25 October 2018	8th	(Moldova) Alexandru Patraman (interim)	25 October 2018

== League table ==
Pos	Team	Pld	W	D	L	GF	GA	GD	Pts	Qualification or relegation
1	Sheriff Tiraspol (C)	28	19	6	3	58	14	+44	63	Qualification for the Champions League first qualifying round
2	Milsami Orhei	28	13	6	9	36	24	+12	45 (Note: Milsami ahead of Petrocub on head-to-head points: Milsami : 7, Petrocub : 4.)	Qualification for the Europa League first qualifying round (Note: Since the winners of 2018–19 Moldovan Cup, Sheriff Tiraspol, qualified for European competition based on their league position, the spot awarded to the Cup winner (Europa League first qualifying round) was passed to the next best-placed team (the fourth-placed team).)
3	Petrocub-Hîncești	28	12	9	7	38	28	+10	45	Qualification for the Europa League first qualifying round
4	Speranța Nisporeni	28	9	11	8	27	26	+1	38	Qualification for the Europa League first qualifying round
5	Zimbru Chișinău	28	9	9	10	28	37	−9	36	
6	Dinamo-Auto	28	7	7	14	25	43	−18	28	
7	Sfîntul Gheorghe	28	6	8	14	30	50	−20	26	
8	Zaria Bălți (R)	28	4	10	14	26	46	−20	22	Relegation to Division "A"

Source: FMF, UEFA, Soccerway
Rules for classification: 1) Points; 2) Play-off (only if deciding champion when two teams tied); 3) Head-to-head points; 4) Head-to-head goal difference; 5) Head-to-head away goals scored; 6) Head-to-head goals scored; 7) Matches won; 8) Goal difference; 9) Goals scored; 10) Less red cards; 11) Less yellow cards.
(C) Champions; (R) Relegated

== Results ==
Matches 1−14

Teams will play each other twice (once home, once away).

Home \ Away	DIN	MIL	PET	SFÎ	SHE	SPE	ZAR	ZIM
Dinamo-Auto	—	0–2	2–2	0–0	0–5	1–2	0–0	1–3
Milsami Orhei	4–0	—	2–1	1–0	0–1	0–1	3–1	1–0
Petrocub-Hîncești	0–3	1–2	—	3–1	1–0	1–1	3–0	3–0 (Note: Zimbru received a 0–3 technical loss in an away game against Petrocub due to violation of regulations. The original match ended in a 2–1 victory for Petrocub)
Sfîntul Gheorghe	0–1	0–1	3–6	—	2–2	2–2	1–0	1–0
Sheriff Tiraspol	5–2	0–0	3–0	4–0	—	3–0	5–1	3–1
Speranța Nisporeni	0–0	1–2	0–0	1–1	0–0	—	0–0	1–1
Zaria Bălți	1–1	2–2	1–2	1–1	0–1	2–1	—	1–1
Zimbru Chișinău	2–2	0–0	2–2	1–1	0–1	1–1	0–3 (Note: Zimbru received a 0–3 technical loss in a home game against Zaria due to violation of regulations. The original match ended in a 4–3 victory for Zimbru.)	—

Source: FMF, Soccerway
Legend: Blue = home team win; Yellow = draw; Red = away team win.
Notes:

Matches 15−28

Teams will play each other twice (once home, once away).

Home \ Away	DIN	MIL	PET	SFÎ	SHE	SPE	ZAR	ZIM
Dinamo-Auto	—	1–0	1–0	3–1	0–1	0–1	0–1	3–0 (Note: Zimbru received a 0–3 technical loss in a away game against Dinamo-Auto due to violation of regulations. The original match ended in a 1–1 draw.)
Milsami Orhei	0–1	—	1–2	3–0	0–2	0–1	3–0	1–1
Petrocub-Hîncești	3–0	1–1	—	0–0	1–0	1–0	1–1	0–1
Sfîntul Gheorghe	5–2	0–2	1–0	—	1–3	1–2	1–0	3–1
Sheriff Tiraspol	2–0	1–1	0–0	4–1	—	2–0	5–2	3–0 (Note: Zimbru received a 0–3 technical loss in a away game against Sheriff due to violation of regulations. The original match ended in a 3–0 victory for Sheriff.)
Speranța Nisporeni	1–0	1–0	1–2	4–1	0–0	—	1–2	1–3
Zaria Bălți	1–1	3–4	1–2	1–1	0–2	0–0	—	0–1
Zimbru Chișinău	1–0	2–0	0–0	2–1	1–0	0–3 (Note: Zimbru received a 0–3 technical loss in a home game against Speranța due to violation of regulations. The original match ended in a 1–0 victory for Zimbru.)	3–1	—

Source: FMF, Soccerway
Legend: Blue = home team win; Yellow = draw; Red = away team win.

== Results by round ==
The following table represents the teams game results in each round.

Team	1	2	3	4	5	6	7	8	9	10	11	12	13	14	15	16	17	18	19	20	21	22	23	24	25	26	27	28
Dinamo-Auto	W	D	D	L	L	W	L	D	D	L	D	D	L	L	L	L	L	L	W (Note: Technical win)	L	W	W	D	L	L	L	W	W
Milsami Orhei	W	W	L	W	D	L	W	D	W	W	W	W	D	W	D	D	L	W	W	L	L	L	L	D	W	W	L	L
Petrocub-Hîncești	L	L	W	W	D	L	D	W	L	W	D	D	W	W	W	D	L	D	W	W	D	D	W	D	W	W	L	L
Sfîntul Gheorghe	L	D	L	L	D	W	D	D	W	L	L	D	L	D	W	L	W	L	L	W	L	L	W	D	L	L	D	L
Sheriff Tiraspol	W	W	W	W	D	W	W	L	D	W	W	W	D	W	L	W	W	W	W	W	W	D	D	D	W	W	L	W
Speranța Nisporeni	D	L	D	D	D	W	D	L	D	D	D	L	W	D	D	L	W	W	L	W	W	L	D	W	L	L	W	W
Zaria Bălți	D	D	D	L	D	L	L	W	D	L	L	D	W	L	D	W	L	D	L	L	L	W	D	L	L	L	D	L
Zimbru Chișinău	L	D	D	D	W	L	D	D	L	D	D	L	L (Note: Technical loss)	L	D	W	W	L	L	L	D	W	L	W	W	W	W	W

== Top goalscorers ==
Rank	Player	Club	Goals
1	(Moldova) Vladimir Ambros	Petrocub	12
2	(Sierra Leone) Alhaji Kamara	Sheriff	9
3	(Belgium) Ziguy Badibanga	Sheriff	8
3	(Luxembourg) Gerson Rodrigues	Sheriff	8
5	(Moldova) Eugeniu Rebenja	Dinamo-Auto	7
5	(Moldova) Mihai Plătică	Milsami	7
5	(Moldova) Alexandru Antoniuc	Milsami	7
8	(Moldova) Sergiu Istrati	Sf. Gheorghe	6
9	(Moldova) Ion Nicolaescu	Zimbru	5
9	(Russia) Aleksandr Butenko	Milsami	5
9	(Moldova) Artiom Puntus	Sf. Gheorghe (3) & Petrocub (2)	5
9	(Moldova) Denis Janu	Dinamo-Auto	5
9	(Moldova) Evgheni Oancea	Sheriff	5
9	(Moldova) Alexandru Bejan	Petrocub (3) & Dinamo-Auto (2)	5
9	(Moldova) Vadim Gulceac	Zaria	5
9	(Moldova) Alexandru Suvorov	Sf. Gheorghe	5
9	(Moldova) Ilie Damașcan	Zimbru	5

== Hat-tricks ==
Player	Home	Away	Result	Date
(Sierra Leone) Alhaji Kamara	Sheriff	Sfîntul Gheorghe	4–0	16 June 2018
(Brazil) Conrado	Zaria	Milsami	3–4	1 September 2018

== Clean sheets ==
Rank	Player	Club	Clean sheets
1	(Moldova) Serghei Pașcenco	Sheriff	11
2	(Russia) Daniil Avdyushkin	Speranța	9
2	(Moldova) Radu Mîțu	Milsami	9
2	(Moldova) Dumitru Celeadnic	Petrocub	9
5	(Moldova) Cristian Avram	Dinamo-Auto	8
6	(Moldova) Dorian Railean	Sf. Gheorghe	6
7	(Portugal) Mickaël Meira	Zimbru	5
7	(Croatia) Zvonimir Mikulić	Sheriff	5
9	(Moldova) Vladimir Livșiț	Zaria	4
10	(Moldova) Victor Buga	Zimbru	3

== Attendances ==
Pos	Team	Total	High	Low	Average	Change
1	Sheriff Tiraspol	19,420	3,500	600	1,387	+3.2%
2	Zimbru Chișinău	18,010	5,500	350	1,286	+42.9%
3	Zaria Bălți	16,550	2,500	50	1,182	−23.4%
4	Milsami Orhei	14,920	2,000	120	1,065	+5.3%
5	Petrocub-Hîncești	12,950	1,500	300	925	+30.1%
6	Speranța Nisporeni	4,550	1,000	100	325	−26.8%
7	Sfîntul Gheorghe	3,420	400	100	244	−24.2%
8	Dinamo-Auto	1,400	200	50	100	−28.1%
	League total	91,220	5,500	50	814	+17.0%

Source: fmf (in Romanian)
