= FC Real Sireți =

Moldovan football club

- Founded: 1 March 2023; 3 years ago
- Ground: Nisporeni Central Stadium
- Capacity: 5,200
- Owner: Vladimir Rebeja
- Manager: Stanislav Luca
- League: Liga
- Website: Website

FC Real Sireți is a Moldovan association football club based in Sireți. The club currently competes in the Liga, the top tier of football in Moldova.

== History ==
FC Real Sireți was founded on 1 March 2023 by club president and owner Vladimir Rebeja, a local entrepreneur and director of a telecommunications company in the United States. As a youth, the owner played for FC Sireți and initially wanted to take over that club rather than starting a new one. However, disagreements with FC Sireți's president prevented that from happening. During the club's first year of existence, its mens side competed in the fourth tier of the Moldovan football league system. It experienced successive promotions to reach the Liga 1 by the 2025–26 season, a stretch that included winning the Southern Series of Liga 2 for the 2024/2025 season. That season, the club defeated FC Iskra Rîbnița in the play-off semi-final to secure its third-straight promotion and its first top flight experience during the 2026–27 campaign.
