= Blănuță =

Blănuță is a surname. Notable people with the surname include:

- Eduard Blănuță (born 1971), Moldovan football manager and player, father of Vladislav
- Vladislav Blănuță (born 2002), Moldovan-Romanian footballer
