= 2024–25 Moldovan Liga 2 =

Liga 2
- Season: 2024–25
- Dates: 24 August 2024 – 17 May 2025
- Promoted: Zimbru-2; Real Sireți; Oguzsport Comrat

The 2024–25 Moldovan Liga 2 was the 34th season of Moldovan football's third-tier league. The season started on 24 August 2024 and ended on 17 May 2025. The league consisted of two regional groups, Nord (North) and Sud (South).

== North ==
Pos	Team	Pld	W	D	L	GF	GA	GD	Pts	Promotion or relegation
1	Zimbru-2 Chișinău (C, P)	22	19	2	1	90	14	+76	59	Promotion to Liga 1
2	EFA Visoca	22	18	0	4	97	22	+75	54	
3	Steaua Nordului	22	16	1	5	66	31	+35	49	
4	Locomotiva Ocnița	22	14	2	6	49	29	+20	44	
5	Edineț	22	10	3	9	33	36	−3	33	
6	Barsa Ungheni	22	8	4	10	29	46	−17	28	withdrew (Note: Barsa Ungheni completed the season but withdrew from the league prior to the start of the next season.)
7	Atletico Bălți	22	8	2	12	32	44	−12	26	
8	Bălți-2	22	7	3	12	25	47	−22	24	withdrew (Note: Bălți-2 completed the season but withdrew from the league prior to the start of the next season.)
9	Țarigrad	22	6	3	13	23	52	−29	21	
10	Grănicerul Glodeni	22	5	3	14	34	61	−27	18	
11	Olimpia Bălți	22	4	2	16	27	67	−40	14	
12	Nisporeni-2023 (R)	22	3	3	16	18	74	−56	12	Relegation to regional level

Source: FMF, Soccerway
Rules for classification: 1) Points; 2) Head-to-head points; 3) Head-to-head goal difference; 4) Head-to-head goals scored; 5) Matches won; 6) Goal difference; 7) Goals scored; 8) Less red cards; 9) Less yellow cards.
(C) Champions; (P) Promoted; (R) Relegated

=== Results ===
Teams will play each other twice (once home, once away).

Home \ Away	ATL	BĂL	BAR	EDI	EFA	GRĂ	LOC	NIS	OLI	STE	ȚAR	ZIM
Atletico Bălți	—	1–0	2–1	0–1	0–5	1–3	0–2	5–2	3–3	1–3	5–0	0–1
Bălți-2	1–2	—	3–1	0–2	2–3	3–2	0–3	1–1	1–0	0–4	0–1	0–9
Barsa Ungheni	1–0	2–2	—	3–1	1–7	1–0	0–4	1–0	5–0	0–0	1–0	0–2
Edineț	1–0	1–0	1–1	—	0–3	1–1	0–1	5–0	1–2	1–2	3–2	0–1
EFA Visoca	7–2	6–1	4–0	8–0	—	11–1	3–1	6–0	5–0	4–1	1–0	2–1
Grănicerul Glodeni	2–2	0–2	3–4	0–4	1–3	—	1–2	4–1	3–1	0–4	4–1	0–1
Locomotiva Ocnița	0–1	4–1	1–1	1–2	2–1	2–1	—	3–1	3–1	2–4	3–0	3–3
Nisporeni-2023	0–1	1–0	2–0	2–3	0–11	0–0	1–3	—	1–2	2–5	1–2	0–8
Olimpia Bălți	0–4	0–2	2–0	1–2	0–4	6–2	2–8	0–3	—	3–4	1–1	0–1
Steaua Nordului	4–1	1–2	4–0	4–1	3–2	2–3	5–0	5–0	4–1	—	2–0	1–2
Țarigrad	3–1	1–2	1–4	2–2	2–1	4–2	0–1	0–0	3–1	0–3	—	0–5
Zimbru-2 Chișinău	4–0	2–2	7–2	2–1	4–0	5–1	1–0	9–0	7–1	6–1	9–0	—

Source: FMF (in Romanian)
Legend: Blue = home team win; Yellow = draw; Red = away team win.

== South ==
Pos	Team	Pld	W	D	L	GF	GA	GD	Pts	Promotion or relegation
1	Real Sireți (C, P)	22	19	2	1	104	19	+85	59	Promotion to Liga 1
2	Oguzsport Comrat (Note: Oguzsport merged with Speranis Nisporeni and were enrolled for the 2025–26 Moldovan Liga 1 season as Oguz Comrat.)	22	18	1	3	75	14	+61	52 (Note: Oguzsport had 3 points deducted for fielding a suspended player in a away game against Real Sireți.)	Promotion to Liga 1
3	Chișinău	22	16	2	4	66	27	+39	50	
4	Atletic Strășeni	22	15	1	6	47	34	+13	46	
5	Socol Copceac	22	11	4	7	41	47	−6	37	
6	Constructorul Leova	22	11	3	8	50	39	+11	36	
7	Lia Sadaclia	22	9	4	9	42	34	+8	31	withdrew (Note: Lia Sadaclia completed the season but were refused the licence and withdrew from the league prior to the start of the next season.)
8	Maiak Chirsova	22	7	1	14	25	37	−12	22	
9	Real Succes	22	5	3	14	23	53	−30	18	
10	Congaz	22	3	2	17	35	85	−50	11	
11	Codru Călărași	22	3	1	18	15	70	−55	10	withdrew (Note: Codru Călărași completed the season but were refused the licence and withdrew from the league prior to the start of the next season.)
12	La Familia (R)	22	3	0	19	13	77	−64	9	Relegation to regional level

Source: FMF, Soccerway
Rules for classification: 1) Points; 2) Head-to-head points; 3) Head-to-head goal difference; 4) Head-to-head goals scored; 5) Matches won; 6) Goal difference; 7) Goals scored; 8) Less red cards; 9) Less yellow cards.
(C) Champions; (P) Promoted; (R) Relegated

=== Results ===
Teams will play each other twice (once home, once away).

Home \ Away	ATL	CHI	COD	CNG	CNS	LAF	LIA	MAI	OGU	RSI	RSU	SOC
Atletic Strășeni	—	3–1	2–0	4–2	3–2	2–0	4–0	1–0	1–2	0–3	7–2	2–2
Chișinău	1–2	—	4–0	8–2	5–1	1–0	2–1	6–1	2–1	2–2	3–2	3–0 (Note: Socol was awarded a technical loss against Chișinău due to their failure to appear at their round 3 match.)
Codru Călărași	1–3	0–2	—	1–0	0–2	1–0	0–2	2–1	0–9	0–6	0–0	0–3
Congaz	1–2	0–7	6–1	—	2–5	5–0	0–0	1–2	1–4	1–5	2–2	2–4
Constructorul Leova	0–1	0–3	2–1	5–1	—	7–0	1–1	2–1	2–2	0–2	3–0	2–0
La Familia	0–1	0–7	3–2	2–0	1–7	—	1–5	1–5	0–6	0–3	0–1	1–2
Lia Sadaclia	5–0	1–1	3–1	9–0	2–1	3–0	—	0–1	1–2	0–5	0–1	1–2
Maiak Chirsova	1–0	1–2	4–0	2–1	0–3	1–2	2–4	—	0–1	1–2	1–0	0–1
Oguzsport Comrat	4–0	1–0	6–1	4–1	5–0	3–0	3–0	2–0	—	1–2	6–0	7–0
Real Sireți	2–3	7–2	5–0	11–1	6–1	9–0	5–1	5–1	3–0 (Note: Oguzsport received a 0–3 technical loss in a away game against Real Sireți for fielding a suspended player. The original match ended in a 1–0 victory for Real Sireți.)	—	9–1	3–3
Real Succes	1–3	1–2	2–0	1–3	2–2	3–0	1–2	1–0	0–3	1–4	—	1–2
Socol Copceac	4–3	1–2	5–4	6–3	1–2	3–2	1–1	0–0	0–3	0–5	1–0	—

Source: FMF (in Romanian)
Legend: Blue = home team win; Yellow = draw; Red = away team win.

== Top goalscorers ==
Rank	Player	Club	Goals
1	(Moldova) Andrei Stratan	EFA Visoca	39
2	(Moldova) Vasile Pașa	EFA Visoca	20
3	(Moldova) Denis Maximov	Oguzsport	19
4	(Moldova) Nicolae Roizman	Real Sireți	18
5	(Moldova) Alexandr Ceavdari	Steaua Nordului	17
6	(Moldova) Roman Șumchin	Oguzsport (3) & Steaua Nordului (11)	14
7	(Moldova) Maxim Musteață	Zimbru-2	13
8	(Moldova) Nicolae Sula	Zimbru-2	12
8	(Moldova) Vasile Noroc	Locomotiva (3) & Grănicerul (9)	12
8	(Moldova) Ivan Nichitov	Congaz (10) & Oguzsport (2)	12
