= Alexandra Can =

Moldovan politician (1952–2023)

Minister of Industry and Trade
- In office 12 March 1999 – 12 December 1999
- President: Petru Lucinschi
- Prime Minister: Ion Sturza
- Preceded by: Ion Tănase

Personal details
- Born: 10 December 1952 Sireți, Strășeni District, Moldavian SSR, USSR
- Died: 21 September 2023 (aged 70)
- Party: PNL

Alexandra Can (10 December 1952 – 21 September 2023) was a Moldovan politician. A member of the National Liberal Party, she served as Minister of Industry and Trade from March to December 1999.

Can died on 21 September 2023, at the age of 70.
