= Daniil Avdyushkin =

Russian football goalkeeper

Personal information
- Full name: Daniil Sergeyevich Avdyushkin
- Date of birth: 1 October 1993 (age 33)
- Place of birth: Penza, Russia
- Height: 1.94 m (6 ft 4 in)
- Position: Goalkeeper

Senior career*
Years	Team	Apps	(Gls)
2011–2012	FC Akademiya Tolyatti	1	(0)
2013–2014	FC Sibir-2 Novosibirsk	20	(0)
2014–2016	FC Sibir Novosibirsk	1	(0)
2015–2016	FC Sibir-2 Novosibirsk	4	(0)
2016–2017	FC Zenit Penza	0	(0)
2017	FC Dynamo Kirov	0	(0)
2017	FC Spicul Chișcăreni	5	(0)
2018–2019	Speranța Nisporeni	32	(0)
2019	FC SKA Rostov-on-Don	8	(0)
2020	FC Rotor-2 Volgograd	0	(0)
2020–2021	FC Irtysh Omsk	7	(0)
2021–2022	FC Sokol Saratov	5	(0)
- * Club domestic league appearances and goals

Daniil Sergeyevich Avdyushkin (Russian: Даниил Серге́евич Авдюшкин; born 1 October 1993) is a Russian former football goalkeeper.

== Club career ==
He made his debut in the Russian Second Division for FC Akademiya Tolyatti on 30 May 2012 in a game against FC Nosta Novotroitsk.

He made his Russian Football National League debut for FC Sibir Novosibirsk on 10 August 2014 in a game against PFC Krylia Sovetov Samara.
