= Caio Ferreira (footballer, born 2000) =

Brazilian footballer (born 2000)

Caio
Personal information
- Full name: Caio Ferreira Martins
- Date of birth: 15 December 2000 (age 25)
- Place of birth: Niterói, Brazil
- Height: 1.78 m (5 ft 10 in)
- Position: Winger

Youth career
- –2020: Cabofriense

Senior career*
Years	Team	Apps	(Gls)
2019–2020	Cabofriense	0	(0)
2021	Sampaio Corrêa-RJ	2	(0)
2022–2023	Rio Branco	6	(1)
2022	→ Capixaba (loan)	3	(1)
2023	Inter de Bebedouro	4	(0)
2023–2024	Artsul	1	(0)
2023	→ Duque de Caxias (loan)	7	(0)
2024	→ Cametá (loan)	5	(0)
2024–2025	Bălți	24	(12)
2025–2026	Argeș Pitești	18	(3)
2026–	Riga	29	(7)
- * Club domestic league appearances and goals as of 12 November 2026

Caio Ferreira Martins (born 15 December 2000), commonly known as Caio, is a Brazilian professional footballer who plays as a winger for Virslīga club Riga FC.

== Honours ==
Duque de Caxias

- Campeonato Carioca Série B1: 2023
