= Stanislav Luca =

Moldovan footballer

Personal information
- Date of birth: 28 June 1986 (age 40)
- Place of birth: Chișinău, Moldavian SSR, Soviet Union
- Height: 1.82 m (5 ft 11 1/2 in)
- Position: Forward

Team information
- Current team: Real Sireți (head coach)

Youth career
- Zimbru Chișinău

Senior career*
Years	Team	Apps	(Gls)
2003–2004	Zimbru Chișinău	1	(0)
2007–2014	Rapid Ghidighici	178	(26)
2014–2015	Costuleni	12	(0)
2015–2016	Spicul Chișcăreni		
2016–2017	Ungheni	5	(0)
2017	Sfîntul Gheorghe	13	(0)

Managerial career
- 2021–2023: Sfîntul Gheorghe
- 2024–2025: Moldova U19 (assistant)
- 2025–2026: Moldova U21 (assistant)
- 2026–: Real Sireți
- * Club domestic league appearances and goals ‡ National team caps and goals as of 21 August 2024

Stanislav Luca (born 28 June 1986) is a Moldovan football manager and former player who is currently the head coach of the Moldovan Liga club Real Sireți.

== Playing career ==
Born in Chișinău, Moldova, Luca started his career with Zimbru Chișinău, where he made his senior debut in the 2003–04 season. He later spent eight seasons with Rapid Ghidighici from 2007 to 2014, after which he played for Costuleni, Spicul Chișcăreni and Ungheni. He finished his playing career with Sfîntul Gheorghe in 2017.

== Managerial career ==
In January 2018, he became a coach at Sfîntul Gheorghe. In 2018, he was the head coach of the reserve team of the club, with which he won the Championship. In 2019, he was appointed assistant coach of the first team, a position he held until he was appointed head coach in September 2021, the position he held until 2023. In 2024 he became the Assistant Coach of Moldova U-19 and one year later with the same position he went to Moldova U-21.
