= Andrian Bogdan =

Association football player

Personal information
- Date of birth: 27 August 1976 (age 50)
- Place of birth: Chișinău, Moldavian SSR, Soviet Union
- Height: 1.90 m (6 ft 3 in)
- Position: Goalkeeper

Youth career
- 1994–1995: Izvoraș-67

Senior career*
Years	Team	Apps	(Gls)
1995–1996	Spumante Cricova	24	(0)
1996	Zimbru Chișinău	2	(0)
1996–2000	Constructorul Chișinău	53	(0)
2000–2001	Național București	0	(0)
2001–2003	Politehnica AEK Timișoara	39	(0)
2003–2004	Rapid București	0	(0)
2005–2006	Unisport-Auto Chișinău	14	(0)
2006	Zorya Luhansk	2	(0)
2007	Alma-Ata	13	(0)
2008	Granit Mikashevichi	8	(0)
2013	Academia Chișinău	1	(0)

International career
2003	Moldova	1	(0)

Managerial career
- 2008–2013: Academia Chișinău (goalkeepers coach)
- 2009–2012: Moldova (goalkeepers coach)
- 2013: Vaslui (goalkeepers coach)
- 2013: Astana (goalkeepers coach)
- * Club domestic league appearances and goals

Andrian Bogdan (born 27 August 1976) is a Moldovan football coach (goalkeepers coach) and former footballer.

== Career ==
As footballer, he has played as goalkeeper for several clubs, including Romanian clubs Politehnica AEK Timișoara, Rapid București, and Moldovan side Constructorul Chișinău. He has played in a friendly match for Moldova national football team, on 12 February 2003, a 2:2 draw.

After withdrawing from football, Bogdan has continued to work in football as goalkeepers coach, and later as assistant manager. Between 2009 and 2012 he was Moldova's national team goalkeepers coach, under the rule of Gabi Balint. From 2008 until 2013 he was goalkeepers coach at FC Academia Chișinău (manager - Igor Dobrovolski). While at FC Academia, on 30 March 2013 Bogdan re-entered as player in an official match, against Olimpia Bălți, in a match of 24th round of 2012-13 Moldovan National Division, won by Academia 3–0; Bogdan succeeded to keep his goal intact and to withdraw definitively from football with a victory. On 9 April in the same year he left FC Academia.

From April until July 2013 he worked as goalkeepers coach for FC Vaslui, while manager was Gabi Balint. From July to December 2013 Bogdan was Ioan Andone's assistant manager at the Kazakhstani club FC Astana.

Andrian Bogdan was a candidate at the 2014 Moldovan parliamentary election on the lists of Party of „Patria”, led by Renato Usatîi, being on the 24th position in the list.

== Honours ==
=== Player ===
Constructorul Chișinău

- Moldovan National Division (1): 1996–97
- Moldovan Cup (1): 1999-2000
