= Vitali Rashkevich =

Belarusian football manager

Personal information
- Full name: Vitali Aleksandrovich Rashkevich
- Date of birth: 8 October 1973 (age 53)
- Place of birth: Belarusian SSR
- Height: 1.83 m (6 ft 0 in)
- Positions: Defender; midfielder

Team information
- Current team: Politehnica UTM (head coach)

Senior career*
Years	Team	Apps	(Gls)
1992–2000	Lida	179	(12)
1995	→ KPF Slonim (loan)	1	(0)

Managerial career
- 2002–2004: Lida
- 2006–2011: Sheriff-2 Tiraspol
- 2011–2012: Sheriff Tiraspol
- 2012–2013: Sheriff-2 Tiraspol
- 2013: Sheriff Tiraspol
- 2017: Energetik-BGU Minsk (assistant)
- 2018: Atyrau (assistant)
- 2019–2021: Shakhtyor Soligorsk (academy coach)
- 2022: Lida
- 2025–: Politehnica UTM
- * Club domestic league appearances and goals

Vitali Aleksandrovich Rashkevich (Belarusian: Віталь Рашкевіч, Russian: Виталий Рашкевич; born 8 October 1973) is a Belarusian football manager. He is the current head coach of Moldovan Liga club Politehnica UTM Chișinău.

== Career ==
Rashkevich started his career with Lida, where he became captain at the age of 22, spending his entire playing career with the club aside from a one-match loan spell with KPF Slonim.

In 2011, Rashkevich was appointed head coach of Sheriff Tiraspol, the most successful team in Moldova, helping them win the league before stepping down at the end of the season.

== Honours ==
Sheriff Tiraspol (as coach)

- Moldovan National Division champion: 2011–12, 2012–13
