= Oleksandr Bezimov =

Ukrainian football striker

Personal information
- Full name: Oleksandr Mykolayovych Bezimov
- Date of birth: 8 February 1984 (age 42)
- Place of birth: Ukrainian SSR
- Height: 1.75 m (5 ft 9 in)
- Position: Striker

Team information
- Current team: FC Zaria Bălți
- Number: 19

Senior career*
| Years | Team | Apps | (Gls) |
| 2006–2007 | FC Spartak Shchyolkovo | 14 | (1) |
| 2010 | FC Zimbru Chișinău | 20 | (4) |
| 2011 | FC Milsami Orhei | 22 | (0) |
| 2012–2013 | FC Iskra-Stal | 29 | (2) |
| 2013 | FC Zimbru Chișinău | 3 | (0) |
| 2013–2014 | FC Costuleni | 10 | (0) |
| 2014– | FC Zaria Bălți | 20 | (1) |
- * Club domestic league appearances and goals as of 27 December 2014

Oleksandr Bezimov (Ukrainian: Олександр Миколайович Безімов; born 8 February 1984 in Ukrainian SSR) is a Ukrainian football striker who currently plays for FC Zaria Bălți in the Moldovan National Division.

Bezimov played in the different Russian and Moldovan football clubs. In February 2014 he signed a contract with FC Olimpia Bălți.
