= FC Sheriff Tiraspol =

Association football club in Transnistria

Sheriff Tiraspol
- Full name: Fotbal Club Sheriff
- Nicknames: Zholto-Chornyye (The Yellow-Blacks); Osy (The Wasps)
- Founded: 1997; 29 years ago as Tiras Tiraspol
- Ground: Sheriff Arena
- Capacity: 12,746
- Owner: Sheriff
- President: Viktor Gushan
- Head coach: Miodrag Džudović
- League: Liga
- 2025–26: Liga, 2nd of 8
- Website: fc-sheriff.com
Home colours	Away colours

Fotbal Club Sheriff Tiraspol (Russian: ФК Шериф Тирасполь), commonly known as Sheriff Tiraspol or simply Sheriff, is a professional football club based in Tiraspol, a city located in the unrecognised breakaway state of Transnistria, that plays in the Moldovan Liga, the top tier of Moldovan football. Founded in 1997 as Tiras Tiraspol and rebranded the following year as Sheriff, it quickly established itself within Moldovan football.

"The Wasps" recorded their debut in the first league in the 1998–99 season, when they also won their first trophy, the Moldovan Cup. They have since amassed 21 championship titles, 13 Cups, and seven Super Cups–all competition records. On the European stage, Sheriff has reached the group stage of the UEFA Europa League on six occasions and in 2021 became the first ever Moldovan side to reach the group stages of the UEFA Champions League, where they would go on to notch a win against eventual champions Real Madrid before eventually exiting the competition.

The club takes its current name from its main sponsor, Sheriff, a company which operates nearly all forms of profitable private industries in Transnistria. Both FC Sheriff and the parent company Sheriff are considered intimately aligned with Transnistrian separatism and pro-Russian sympathies.

Home games are played in yellow and black kits at the Sheriff Arena, to which the club moved in 2002 and which has a capacity of 12,746.

== History ==
The club was originally established in 1996 and introduced in the Moldovan "B" Division as FC Tiras Tiraspol. On 4 April 1997, former KGB officer Viktor Gushan, owner of the conglomerate Sheriff which remains a key sponsor, renamed it FC Sheriff Tiraspol.

Sheriff achieved promotion to the second tier of Moldovan football, the Moldovan "A" Division, and under the guidance of Ahmad Alaskarov was charged with leading the team to the Moldovan top division. Later that year the club won the championship by 14 points, being promoted to Divizia Națională. The club won its first major honour with the 1999 Moldovan Cup. In the final at the Republican Stadium, Sheriff scored an injury-time equaliser before winning the match against Constructorul Chișinău 2–1 after extra time. Sheriff's first National Division title came in the 2000–01 season, which also included their second Moldovan Cup triumph as they beat Nistru Otaci on penalties after a goalless match. The league triumph was the first of a run of ten consecutively up to 2010, also including league-cup doubles in 2002, 2006 and 2008–10. Sheriff won each Moldovan Super Cup from 2004 to 2010, but did not have to play a match on four occasions due to winning it on default through a double. Sheriff were denied an 11th-straight title by Dacia Chișinău in 2010–11, but reclaimed the title the following season. In 2014–15, Sheriff again lost the championship despite being level with both Milsami Orhei and Dacia Chișinău at the top of the table with 55 points; Milsami would finish in first place because of its superior head-to-head record against both Sheriff and Dacia, with Dacia second and Sheriff third, despite Sheriff having the superior goal difference amongst the clubs.

The team won the Commonwealth of Independent States Cup in 2003 and 2009, becoming the first team from Moldova to win an international title. Sheriff were the first club in Moldova to sign players from Brazil and Africa.

=== Europe ===
From 2001–02 to 2008–09, the club tried to reach the group stage in the UEFA Champions League every year, but failed in the second qualifying round every time. Its European fortunes improved after 2009. Sheriff has appeared in three UEFA Europa League group stages (2009–10, 2010–11, 2013–14) with decent results, although they did not manage to qualify to the knock-out stage. In 2017, they qualified to the group stage for the fourth time, after beating favourites Legia Warsaw on away goals in the play-off round.

==== 2009–10 UEFA Europa League ====
In the 2009–10 season, Sheriff finally reached the third qualifying round when they defeated Inter Turku. In the next round, Sheriff defeated Slavia Prague 1–1 on aggregate, progressing via the away goal rule due to Nadson's 94th-minute strike in the second leg. They were then eliminated from the 2009–10 UEFA Champions League by Greek club Olympiacos in the qualifying play-off for a spot in the group stage. Sheriff lost 2–0 in the first leg at home, and 1–0 in the second leg away.

However, by virtue of losing in the play-off round, Sheriff qualified for the 2009–10 UEFA Europa League group stage, where they were drawn into Group H alongside Fenerbahçe, Twente and Steaua București. On 17 September 2009, their first Europa League match, Sheriff drew 0–0 away against Steaua. On 1 October, Sheriff's first Europa League home match, the club lost 1–0 to Fenerbahçe. On 22 October, Sheriff produced a stunning 2–0 home victory over Twente, ending Twente's 17-match unbeaten run. 2 December, Sheriff drew 1–1 at home with Steaua. Sheriff failed to progress past the group stage after finishing third in Group H with five points, ahead of Steaua.

==== 2010–11 UEFA Champions League ====
In the 2010–11 UEFA Champions League, on 14–20 July 2010, Sheriff defeated Dinamo Tirana in the second qualifying round (3–1, 0–1). Then, on 4 August, the club defeated Dinamo Zagreb on penalties (6–5) after identical 1–1 draws at home and away, thereby reaching the play-off round. On 18–24 August, in the play-off round against Basel, Sheriff lost 1–0 in Switzerland before losing 3–0 at home.

==== 2010–11 UEFA Europa League ====
Dropping to the 2010–11 UEFA Europa League after their play-off defeat to Basel, Sheriff was drawn into Group E alongside Dynamo Kyiv, AZ and BATE Borisov. After losing their first match 2–1 away against AZ on 15 September 2010, on 30 September, Sheriff defeated Dynamo Kyiv 2–0 at home. After losing two-straight matches against BATE – 0–1 at home and 3–1 away on 21 October and 4 November respectively – on 2 December, Sheriff drew 1–1 with AZ at home, then on 15 December, Sheriff drew 0–0 against Dynamo Kyiv away in Kyiv. Accumulating five points, Sheriff failed to progress past the group stage after finishing last in Group E.

==== 2013–14 UEFA Europa League ====
In the 2013–14 UEFA Europa League, Sheriff played in a group with Tottenham Hotspur, Anzhi Makhachkala and Tromsø, in which they finished third.

==== 2017–18 UEFA Europa League ====
In the 2017–18 UEFA Europa League, Sheriff played in a group with Lokomotiv Moscow, Copenhagen, Fastav Zlín, in which they finished third once more.

==== 2021–22 UEFA Champions League ====
In the 2021–22 UEFA Champions League, Sheriff became the first Moldovan team to qualify for the group stages of the competition after a 3–0 aggregate win over Dinamo Zagreb. They were drawn into Group D to face Inter Milan, Real Madrid and Shakhtar Donetsk. On 15 September, Sheriff won their opening group game, 2–0 against Shakhtar Donetsk, before following it up with an upset 2–1 away victory over Real Madrid at the Santiago Bernabéu on 28 September 2021, with Sébastien Thill scoring the winning goal in the 89th minute. Despite losing their next three games against Inter Milan and Real Madrid, they secured qualification for the preliminary knockout round of the Europa League on 24 November 2021 when Shakhtar Donetsk lost to Inter Milan. They ended their campaign with a 1–1 away draw with Shakhtar, which meant they ended up with seven points from their six games.

==== 2021–22 UEFA Europa League ====
Sheriff had serious squad problems before the start of the UEFA Europa League knockout rounds. The departure of important players such as Cristiano da Silva Leite, Frank Castañeda, Danilo Arboleda, Dimitris Kolovos and Fernando Peixoto Costanza caused serious problems in the squad. Sheriff replaced all the departures with new players like Regi Lushkja, Gaby Kiki, Renan Guedes and Patrick Kpozo. However, the rules of the Moldovan championship allow teams to announce their new players from 23 February. Since the deadline for registration in the Europa League was February 2, coach Yuriy Vernydub was obliged to include players who had not played much in the starting line-up, such as Stjepan Radeljić, Stefanos Evangelou and Charles Petro.

They were the first ever Moldovan side to play in the knockout stages of a European competition, and were drawn against S.C. Braga of Portugal. They won 2–0 in the initial home leg – with the goal scorers being Sébastien Thill and Adama Traoré in a game where Sheriff put in a solid performance despite having a vastly different squad to the one that stunned Real Madrid. Finally, the European campaign ended with a 2–0 defeat and a dramatic penalty shootout that ended 3–2 in favour of Braga.

== Club identity, supporters and politics ==
FC Sheriff are considered to be intimately aligned with Transnistria.

Although they are the largest club in the Moldovan football league, FC Sheriff is heavily associated with Transnistrian separatism and nationalism. Based in Tiraspol, the de facto capital of the unrecognised breakaway state of Transnistria, the club has become a vehicle for regional identity and political symbolism. While it officially competes under the jurisdiction of the Moldovan Football Federation, its cultural and political affiliations lie firmly within Transnistria’s self-proclaimed statehood and pro-Russian orientation.

Founded in 1997 by ex-KGB officers Viktor Gushan and Ilya Kazmaly, FC Sheriff is owned by Sheriff Ltd., the most powerful business conglomerate in Transnistria. The company has monopolistic control over the region’s economy, including supermarkets, petrol stations, telecommunications, construction, media, and banking. Sheriff Ltd. also controls the dominant political party Obnovlenie and maintains close ties with Moscow, reinforcing its role as a tool of soft power for the separatist government.

The club’s home ground, the Sheriff Stadium complex, is one of the most modern in Eastern Europe, and its lavish infrastructure stands in sharp contrast to the economic underdevelopment of much of Moldova. This disparity feeds into a sense of Transnistrian distinctiveness and superiority, further alienating the club from Moldovan national identity.

The supporters of FC Sheriff often express open pride in the region’s separatism. At matches in Tiraspol, flags of Transnistria are commonly flown, and Soviet and Russian symbols are prominent. The club is seen locally as an ambassador for Transnistrian statehood, providing international visibility to a territory that is otherwise diplomatically isolated. Its UEFA Champions League appearances, particularly the famous 2021 victory over Real Madrid, were treated by local authorities and media as not only a sporting achievement but a vindication of Transnistrian legitimacy on the world stage.

Observers and analysts have argued that FC Sheriff’s success is being used to project an image of stability and capability in Transnistria, while subtly undermining Moldovan sovereignty. Critics also point to the lack of Moldovan players in the squad and the club’s minimal integration into Moldova’s broader football culture as further evidence of its political detachment.

== Stadium ==
Sheriff Arena is the home ground of Sheriff Tiraspol and is owned by the corporation Sheriff. Construction of the ground began on 1 August 2000 and was completed in May 2002, with the official opening in July 2002. It was renovated in 2011. The stadium has a seating capacity for 12,746 spectators and is eligible for FIFA/UEFA international events. Beside Sheriff, the stadium has also hosted matches for FC Tiraspol and the Transnistria national football team.

Aside from the main arena of Sheriff Sports Complex, there is also an 8,000 seater stadium, Malaya Sportivnaya Arena, also situated in the same complex, along with eight training fields, a covered training centre, housing for the players, a college for students and a five-star hotel.

In June 2022, UEFA ordered that no European games would be permitted to be played in Transnistria, as a direct consequence of the 2022 Russian invasion of Ukraine. Sheriff played all of their home fixtures in the 2022–23 UEFA Europa League and 2022–23 UEFA Europa Conference League at Zimbru Stadium in Chișinău.

== Players ==
As of 8 August 2026

Note: Flags indicate national team as defined under FIFA eligibility rules; some limited exceptions apply. Players may hold more than one non-FIFA nationality.

No.	Pos.	Nation	Player
1	GK	MDA	Emil Tîmbur
2	DF	BFA	Mamoutou Ouedraogo
4	DF	LBR	Natus Swen
7	MF	MDA	Ștefan Bîtca
8	FW	MDA	Dan Boțan
9	FW	NOR	Kabamba Kalabatama
10	MF	MDA	Vladimir Fratea
11	FW	BRA	Sapata
12	GK	MDA	Renat Josan
15	DF	SEN	Baye Assane Ciss
18	MF	MLI	Moussa Kyabou
19	FW	COL	Jayder Asprilla
21	GK	BUL	Ivan Dyulgerov
22	DF	POR	Miguel Mota

No.	Pos.	Nation	Player
24	DF	MDA	Danila Forov
26	MF	SUR	Dhoraso Klas
27	FW	MDA	Veaceslav Cozma
28	GK	MDA	Nicolae Cebotari
29	DF	MLI	Soumaïla Magossouba
32	MF	GHA	Emmanuel Afetse
33	MF	MDA	Mihail Corotcov
35	DF	MLI	Bourama Fomba (captain)
37	DF	PAN	Jair Modelo (on loan from CA Independiente)
42	FW	CIV	Konan Loukou
76	MF	ALB	Arli Pergjoni
77	MF	DOM	Juanca Pineda (on loan from Beroe)
90	MF	MDA	Vladislav Costin
99	MF	MLI	Samba Koné (on loan from Académico de Viseu)

=== Out on loan ===
Note: Flags indicate national team as defined under FIFA eligibility rules; some limited exceptions apply. Players may hold more than one non-FIFA nationality.

No.	Pos.	Nation	Player
—	FW	BRA	Luis Phelipe (at Lee Man until 31 May 2027)

== Honours ==
FC Sheriff Tiraspol honours
Type	Competition	Titles	Seasons
Domestic	Divizia Națională / Super Liga	21	2000–01, 2001–02, 2002–03, 2003–04, 2004–05, 2005–06, 2006–07, 2007–08, 2008–09, 2009–10, 2011–12, 2012–13, 2013–14, 2015–16, 2016–17, 2017, 2018, 2019, 2020–21, 2021–22, 2022–23
Domestic	Divizia A (level 2)	1	1997–98
Domestic	Divizia B (level 3)	1	1996–97
Domestic	Cupa Moldovei	14	1998–99, 2000–01, 2001–02, 2005–06, 2007–08, 2008–09, 2009–10, 2014–15, 2016–17, 2018–19, 2021–22, 2022–23, 2024–25, 2025–26
Domestic	Supercupa Moldovei	7	2003, 2004, 2005, 2007, 2013, 2015, 2016
International	CIS Cup	2	2003, 2009

Record

== Records and statistics ==
- Most appearances (443): Vazha Tarkhnishvili
- Most goals (71): Alexey Kuchuk
- Record victory (19 October 2005, Moldovan Cup): Sheriff–Viitorul Orhei, 16–0
- Record defeat (UEFA Europa League, 5 October 2023): Slavia Prague–Sheriff, 6–0
- Biggest win in UEFA competition (23 July 2013): Sheriff–Sutjeska, 5–0
- Appearances in UEFA Champions League: 13
- Appearances in UEFA Europa League: 7
- Player with most UEFA appearances: Vazha Tarkhnishvili (54)
- Top scorers in UEFA club competitions: Ziguy Badibanga (8)

=== European record ===
As of match played on 13 August 2026

Competition	Played	Won	Drew	Lost	GF	GA	GD	Win%
UEFA Champions League	94	35	19	40	99	98	+1	37.23
UEFA Cup / UEFA Europa League	80	17	28	35	70	93	−23	21.25
UEFA Conference League	10	1	1	8	7	21	−14	10.00
Total	184	53	48	83	176	212	−36	28.80

Legend: GF = Goals For. GA = Goals Against. GD = Goal Difference.

==== Matches ====
Season	Competition	Round	Club	Home	Away	Aggregate
1999–2000	UEFA Cup	QR	(Czech Republic) Sigma Olomouc	1–1	0–0	1–1 (a)
2000–01	UEFA Cup	QR	(Slovenia) Olimpija Ljubljana	0–0	0–3	0–3
2001–02	UEFA Champions League	1Q	(Armenia) Araks Ararat	1–0	2–0	3–0
2001–02	UEFA Champions League	2Q	(Belgium) Anderlecht	1–2	0–4	1–6
2002–03	UEFA Champions League	1Q	(Kazakhstan) Astana	2–1	2–3	4–4 (a)
2002–03	UEFA Champions League	2Q	(Austria) Grazer AK	0–2	1–4	1–6
2003–04	UEFA Champions League	1Q	(Estonia) Flora Tallinn	1–0	1–1	2–1
2003–04	UEFA Champions League	2Q	(Ukraine) Shakhtar Donetsk	0–0	0–2	0–2
2004–05	UEFA Champions League	1Q	(Luxembourg) Jeunesse Esch	2–0	0–1	2–1
2004–05	UEFA Champions League	2Q	(Norway) Rosenborg	0–2	1–2	1–4
2005–06	UEFA Champions League	1Q	(Malta) Sliema Wanderers	2–0	4–1	6–1
2005–06	UEFA Champions League	2Q	(Serbia and Montenegro) Partizan	0–1	0–1	0–2
2006–07	UEFA Champions League	1Q	(Armenia) Pyunik	2–0	0–0	2–0
2006–07	UEFA Champions League	2Q	(Russia) Spartak Moscow	1–1	0–0	1–1 (a)
2007–08	UEFA Champions League	1Q	(Andorra) Rànger's	2–0	3–0	5–0
2007–08	UEFA Champions League	2Q	(Turkey) Beşiktaş	0–1	0–3	0–4
2008–09	UEFA Champions League	1Q	(Kazakhstan) Aktobe	4–0	0–1	4–1
2008–09	UEFA Champions League	2Q	(Czech Republic) Sparta Prague	0–1	0–2	0–3
2009–10	UEFA Champions League	2Q	(Finland) Inter Turku	1–0	1–0	2–0
2009–10	UEFA Champions League	3Q	(Czech Republic) Slavia Prague	0–0	1–1	1–1 (a)
2009–10	UEFA Champions League	PO	(Greece) Olympiacos	0–2	0–1	0–3
2009–10	UEFA Europa League	Group H	(Romania) Steaua București	1–1	0–0	3rd
2009–10	UEFA Europa League	Group H	(Turkey) Fenerbahçe	0–1	0–1	3rd
2009–10	UEFA Europa League	Group H	(Netherlands) Twente	2–0	1–2	3rd
2010–11	UEFA Champions League	2Q	(Albania) Dinamo Tirana	3–1	0–1	3–2
2010–11	UEFA Champions League	3Q	(Croatia) Dinamo Zagreb	1–1	1–1 (a.e.t.)	2–2 (6–5 p)
2010–11	UEFA Champions League	PO	(Switzerland) Basel	0–1	0–3	0–4
2010–11	UEFA Europa League	Group E	(Netherlands) AZ Alkmaar	1–1	1–2	4th
2010–11	UEFA Europa League	Group E	(Ukraine) Dynamo Kyiv	2–0	0–0	4th
2010–11	UEFA Europa League	Group E	(Belarus) BATE Borisov	0–1	1–3	4th
2011–12	UEFA Europa League	2Q	(Bosnia and Herzegovina) Željezničar	0–0	0–1	0–1
2012–13	UEFA Champions League	2Q	(Armenia) Ulisses	1–0	1–0	2–0
2012–13	UEFA Champions League	3Q	(Croatia) Dinamo Zagreb	0–1	0–4	0–5
2012–13	UEFA Europa League	PO	(France) Marseille	1–2	0–0	1–2
2013–14	UEFA Champions League	2Q	(Montenegro) Sutjeska Nikšić	1–1	5–0	6–1
2013–14	UEFA Champions League	3Q	(Croatia) Dinamo Zagreb	0–3	0–1	0–4
2013–14	UEFA Europa League	PO	(Serbia) Vojvodina	2–1	1–1	3–2
2013–14	UEFA Europa League	Group K	(England) Tottenham Hotspur	0–2	1–2	3rd
2013–14	UEFA Europa League	Group K	(Russia) Anzhi Makhachkala	0–0	1–1	3rd
2013–14	UEFA Europa League	Group K	(Norway) Tromsø	2–0	1–1	3rd
2014–15	UEFA Champions League	2Q	(Montenegro) Sutjeska Nikšić	2–0	3–0	5–0
2014–15	UEFA Champions League	3Q	(Slovakia) Slovan Bratislava	0–0	1–2	1–2
2014–15	UEFA Europa League	PO	(Croatia) Rijeka	0–3	0–1	0–4
2015–16	UEFA Europa League	1Q	(Norway) Odd	0–3	0–0	0–3
2016–17	UEFA Champions League	2Q	(Israel) Hapoel Be'er Sheva	0–0	2–3	2–3
2017–18	UEFA Champions League	2Q	(Albania) Kukësi	1–0	1–2	2–2 (a)
2017–18	UEFA Champions League	3Q	(Azerbaijan) Qarabağ	1–2	0–0	1–2
2017–18	UEFA Europa League	PO	(Poland) Legia Warsaw	0–0	1–1	1–1 (a)
2017–18	UEFA Europa League	Group F	(Denmark) Copenhagen	0–0	0–2	3rd
2017–18	UEFA Europa League	Group F	(Czech Republic) Fastav Zlín	1–0	0–0	3rd
2017–18	UEFA Europa League	Group F	(Russia) Lokomotiv Moscow	1–1	2–1	3rd
2018–19	UEFA Champions League	1Q	(Georgia (country)) Torpedo Kutaisi	3–0	1–2	4–2
2018–19	UEFA Champions League	2Q	(North Macedonia) Shkëndija	0–0	0–1	0–1
2018–19	UEFA Europa League	3Q	(Iceland) Valur	1–0	1–2	2–2 (a)
2018–19	UEFA Europa League	PO	(Azerbaijan) Qarabağ	1–0	0–3	1–3
2019–20	UEFA Champions League	1Q	(Georgia (country)) Saburtalo Tbilisi	0–3	3–1	3−4
2019–20	UEFA Europa League	2Q	(Albania) Partizani	1–1	1–0	2−1
2019–20	UEFA Europa League	3Q	(Sweden) AIK	1–2	1–1	2−3
2020–21	UEFA Champions League	1Q	(Luxembourg) Fola Esch	2–0	—N/a	—N/a
2020–21	UEFA Champions League	2Q	(Azerbaijan) Qarabağ	—N/a	1–2	—N/a
2020–21	UEFA Europa League	3Q	(Republic of Ireland) Dundalk	1–1 (3–5 p)	—N/a	—N/a
2021–22	UEFA Champions League	1Q	(Albania) Teuta	1–0	4–0	5–0
2021–22	UEFA Champions League	2Q	(Armenia) Alashkert	3–1	1–0	4–1
2021–22	UEFA Champions League	3Q	(Serbia) Red Star Belgrade	1–0	1–1	2–1
2021–22	UEFA Champions League	PO	(Croatia) Dinamo Zagreb	3–0	0–0	3–0
2021–22	UEFA Champions League	Group D	(Ukraine) Shakhtar Donetsk	2–0	1–1	3rd
2021–22	UEFA Champions League	Group D	(Spain) Real Madrid	0–3	2–1	3rd
2021–22	UEFA Champions League	Group D	(Italy) Inter Milan	1–3	1–3	3rd
2021–22	UEFA Europa League	KPO	(Portugal) Braga	2–0	0–2 (a.e.t.)	2–2 (2–3 p)
2022–23	UEFA Champions League	1Q	(Bosnia and Herzegovina) Zrinjski Mostar	1–0	0–0	1−0
2022–23	UEFA Champions League	2Q	(Slovenia) Maribor	1–0	0–0	1−0
2022–23	UEFA Champions League	3Q	(Czech Republic) Viktoria Plzeň	1–2	1–2	2–4
2022–23	UEFA Europa League	PO	(Armenia) Pyunik	0–0 (a.e.t.)	0–0	0–0 (3–2 p)
2022–23	UEFA Europa League	Group E	(England) Manchester United	0–2	0–3	3rd
2022–23	UEFA Europa League	Group E	(Spain) Real Sociedad	0–2	0–3	3rd
2022–23	UEFA Europa League	Group E	(Cyprus) Omonia	1–0	3–0	3rd
2022–23	UEFA Europa Conference League	KPO	(Serbia) Partizan	0–1	3–1	3−2
2022–23	UEFA Europa Conference League	1/16	(France) Nice	0–1	1–3	1−4
2023–24	UEFA Champions League	1Q	(Romania) Farul Constanța	3–0 (a.e.t.)	0–1	3–1
2023–24	UEFA Champions League	2Q	(Israel) Maccabi Haifa	1–0	1–4 (a.e.t.)	2–4
2023–24	UEFA Europa League	3Q	(Belarus) BATE Borisov	5–1	2–2	7–3
2023–24	UEFA Europa League	PO	(Faroe Islands) KÍ	2–1	1–1	3–2
2023–24	UEFA Europa League	Group G	(Italy) Roma	1–2	0–3	4th
2023–24	UEFA Europa League	Group G	(Czech Republic) Slavia Prague	2–3	0–6	4th
2023–24	UEFA Europa League	Group G	(Switzerland) Servette	1–1	1–2	4th
2024–25	UEFA Europa League	1Q	(Azerbaijan) Zira	0–1	2–1 (a.e.t.)	2–2 (5–4 p)
2024–25	UEFA Europa League	2Q	(Sweden) Elfsborg	0–1	0–2	0–3
2024–25	UEFA Conference League	3Q	(Slovenia) Olimpija Ljubljana	0–1	0–3	0–4
2025–26	UEFA Europa League	1Q	(Kosovo) Prishtina	4–0	1–2	5–2
2025–26	UEFA Europa League	2Q	(Netherlands) Utrecht	1–3	1–4	2–7
2025–26	UEFA Conference League	3Q	(Belgium) Anderlecht	1–1	0–3	1–4
2026–27	UEFA Europa League	1Q	(Slovenia) Aluminij	0–0	1–0	1–0
2026–27	UEFA Europa League	2Q	(Israel) Maccabi Tel Aviv	0–5	0–1	0–6
2026–27	UEFA Conference League	3Q	(Switzerland) St. Gallen	1–3	1–5	2–8

== Club officials ==
=== Technical staff ===
As of 1 January 2026

Position	Name
Head coach	(Moldova) Victor Mihailov
Assistant coach	(Moldova) Andrei Corneencov
Assistant coach	(Ukraine) Dmytro Parkhomenko
Goalkeeping coach	(Moldova) Vladislav Baclanov
Analyst	(Moldova) Dumitru Boguș
Team manager	(Moldova) Oleg Țurcanu
Head doctor	(Moldova) Vladimir Vremeș
Doctor	(Moldova) Victor Belîi
Kinesitherapist	(Moldova) Alexandru Caramanov
Masseur	(Moldova) Veaceslav Palii
Masseur	(Moldova) Veaceslav Alexeev
Team administrator	(Moldova) Vladimir Muntean

=== Board of directors ===
As of 1 January 2026

Position	Name
President	(Moldova) Viktor Gushan
General director	(Moldova) Serghei Pașcenco

=== Managers ===
- (Azerbaijan) Ahmad Alaskarov (1997–1998)
- (Belarus) Sergei Borovski (2 January 1998 – 1 January 1999)
- (Moldova) Ivan Daniliants (1999–2000)
- (Ukraine) Oleksandr Holokolosov (2001–2002)
- (Romania) Mihai Stoichiță (1 January 2002 – 30 June 2002)
- (Romania) Gavril Balint (1 July 2002 – 30 June 2003)
- (Ukraine) Ihor Nakonechny (1 July 2003 – 30 June 2004)
- (Belarus) Leonid Kuchuk (1 January 2004 – 31 December 2009)
- (Belarus) Andrei Sosnitskiy (1 January 2010 – 30 April 2011)
- (Belarus) Vitali Rashkevich (30 April 2011 – 29 May 2012)
- (Serbia) Milan Milanović (1 July 2012 – 10 August 2012)
- (Belarus) Vitali Rashkevich (interim) (11 August 2012 – 15 August 2012)
- (Romania) Mihai Stoichiță (15 August 2012 – 2 April 2013)
- (Spain) Juan Ferrando (interim) (3 April 2013 – 8 July 2013)
- (Spain) Juan Ferrando (July 2013 – December 2013)

Information correct as of match played 31 August 2025. Only competitive matches are counted.
Name	Nat.	Period		G	W	D	L	GF	GA	Win %	Honours	Notes
Name	Nat.	From	To	G	W	D	L	GF	GA	Win %	Honours	Notes
Veaceslav Rusnac	Moldova	12 July 2013	14 August 2014	41	32	4	5	113	25	78.05	2013–14 Divizia Națională	
Zoran Zekić	Croatia	14 August 2014	26 May 2015	23	16	3	4	52	16	69.57	2014–15 Moldovan Cup	
Lilian Popescu	Moldova	27 May 2015	5 October 2015	13	7	4	2	21	9	53.85	2015 Moldovan Super Cup	
Zoran Vulić	Croatia	7 October 2015	12 June 2016	21	17	2	2	43	9	80.95	2015–16 Divizia Națională	
Bruno Irles	France	22 July 2016	23 September 2016	11	7	1	3	23	9	63.64	2016 Moldovan Super Cup	
Victor Mihailov (interim)	Moldova	23 September 2016	4 October 2016	1	1	0	0	2	0	100.00		
Roberto Bordin	Italy	4 October 2016	24 April 2018	62	40	14	8	145	40	64.52	2016–17 Divizia Națională 2016-17 Moldovan Cup 2017 Divizia Națională	
Victor Mihailov (interim)	Moldova	24 April 2018	7 June 2018	5	2	2	1	6	4	40.00		
Goran Sablić	Croatia	7 June 2018	27 April 2019	35	21	5	9	64	24	60.00	2018 Divizia Națională	
Zoran Zekić	Croatia	30 April 2019	21 October 2020	44	34	6	4	102	25	77.27	2019 Divizia Națională 2018–19 Moldovan Cup	
Victor Mihailov (interim)	Moldova	21 October 2020	18 December 2020	7	5	1	1	14	3	71.43		
Yuriy Vernydub	Ukraine	18 December 2020	24 February 2022	53	39	9	5	152	26	73.58	2020–21 Divizia Națională	
Dmytro Kara-Mustafa (Acting)	Ukraine	24 February 2022	21 June 2022	14	11	1	2	28	5	78.57	2021–22 Divizia Națională; 2021–22 Moldovan Cup	
Stjepan Tomas	Croatia	21 June 2022	25 October 2022	25	12	7	6	33	16	48.00		
Victor Mihailov (interim)	Moldova	25 October 2022	9 January 2023	4	3	0	1	5	4	75.00		
Roberto Bordin	Italy	9 January 2023	6 October 2023	36	22	6	8	62	31	61.11	2022–23 Divizia Națională; 2022–23 Moldovan Cup	
Victor Mihailov (Interim)	Moldova	6 October 2023	11 October 2023	1	0	1	0	0	0	0.00		
Roman Pylypchuk	Ukraine	11 October 2023	19 March 2024	14	7	3	4	30	15	50.00		
Victor Mihailov (Interim)	Moldova	19 March 2024	7 May 2024	12	8	2	2	25	8	66.67		
Yuriy Hura	Ukraine	7 May 2024	5 August 2024	7	3	0	4	6	6	42.86		
Mislav Karoglan	Bosnia and Herzegovina	5 August 2024	15 April 2025	22	14	6	2	52	15	63.64		
Victor Mihailov	Moldova	15 April 2025	3 September 2025	26	16	5	5	49	23	61.54		
Vadim Skripchenko	Belarus	3 September 2025	5 November 2025	8	5	0	3	18	6	62.50		
Victor Mihailov	Moldova	5 November 2025		3	1	0	2	6	5	33.33		

Notes

P – Total of played matches W – Won matches D – Drawn matches L – Lost matches GS – Goal scored GA – Goals against
%W – Percentage of matches won
Nationality is indicated by the corresponding FIFA country code(s).
