= Suruceni Stadium =

Football stadium in Suruceni, Moldova

Stadionul Suruceni
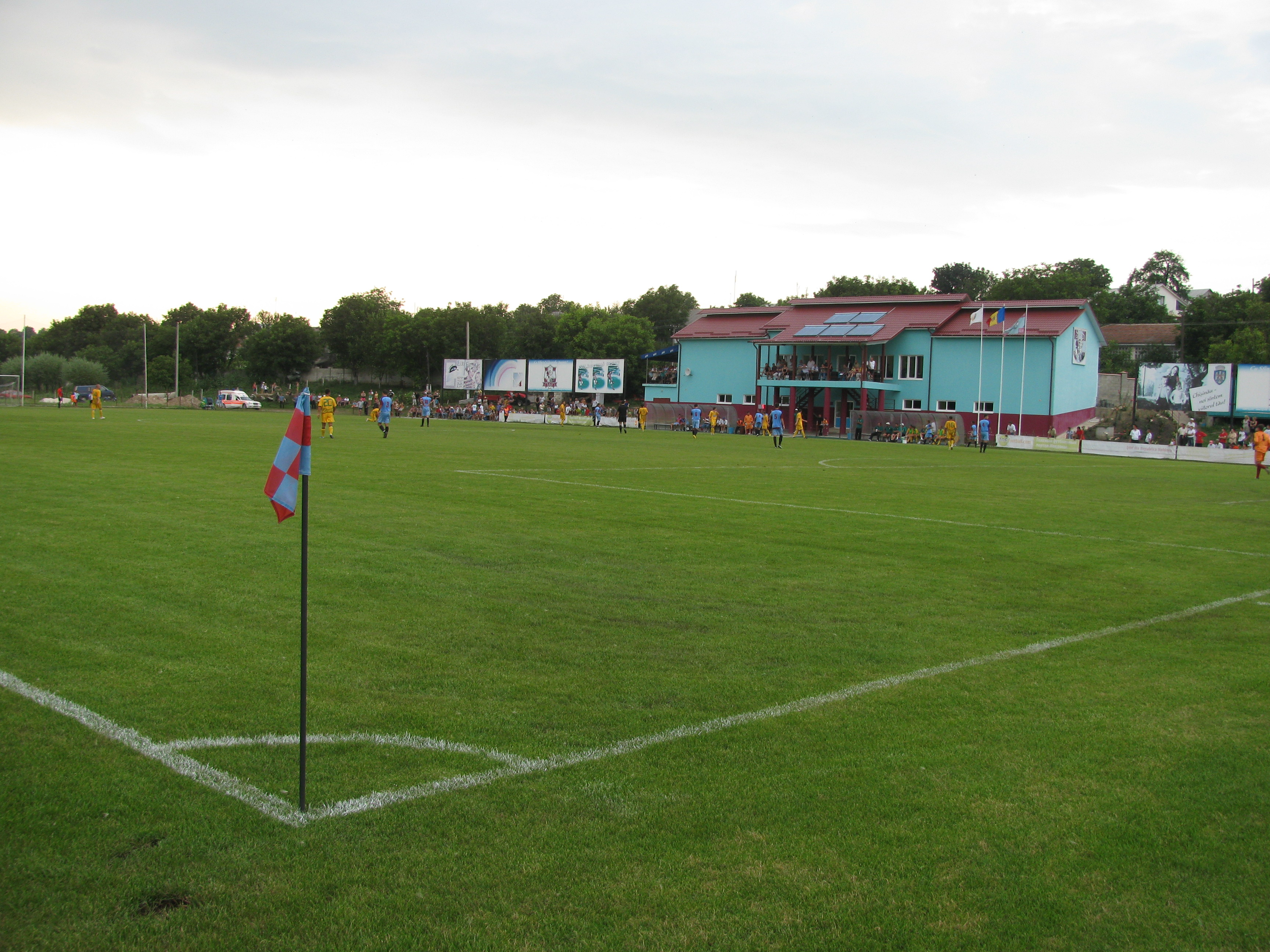
- The stadium in 2010
- Interactive map of Stadionul Suruceni
- Location: Suruceni, Moldova
- Coordinates: 46.984442°N 28.666967°E
- Capacity: 350
- Surface: Grass
- Scoreboard: Yes
- Field size: 105 x 68 m

Construction
- Built: 2009
- Opened: 2009

Tenants
- Sfîntul Gheorghe (2009–2023); Spartanii Sportul (2023–2024; 2025–present); Politehnica UTM (2025–present)

Suruceni Stadium is a football stadium in Suruceni, Moldova. It currently serves as the home stadium for Spartanii Sportul and Politehnica UTM of the Liga. It was the home of Sfîntul Gheorghe, until its dissolution in 2023. The stadium opened in 2009 as a result of the team's promotion to the Moldovan National Division. The stadium has a capacity of 350 spectators.
