= Ivan Dokić =

Serbian footballer

Personal information
- Date of birth: 25 March 2000 (age 26)
- Place of birth: Novi Sad, FR Yugoslavia
- Height: 1.87 m (6 ft 2 in)
- Position: Goalkeeper

Team information
- Current team: Zimbru Chișinău
- Number: 88

Youth career
- Srbobran
- Spartak Subotica

Senior career*
| Years | Team | Apps | (Gls) |
| 2016–2021 | Spartak Subotica | 12 | (0) |
| 2017 | → Bačka 1901 (loan) | 3 | (0) |
| 2019 | → Bačka 1901 (loan) | | |
| 2021 | Radnički Pirot | 16 | (0) |
| 2021–2023 | Almopos Aridea | 39 | (0) |
| 2023–2024 | Aiolikos | 24 | (0) |
| 2024–2025 | Ilioupolis | 18 | (0) |
| 2025– | Zimbru Chișinău | 14 | (0) |

International career^{‡}
| 2016 | Serbia U16 | 1 | (0) |
| 2016 | Serbia U17 | 1 | (0) |
- * Club domestic league appearances and goals as of 1 June 2026 ‡ National team caps and goals as of 25 June 2017

Ivan Dokić (Serbian Cyrillic: Иван Докић; born 25 March 2000) is a Serbian professional footballer who plays as a goalkeeper for Moldovan Liga club Zimbru Chișinău.

== Club career ==
=== Spartak Subotica ===
Born in Novi Sad, Dokić started playing football at the age of 4. After he spent a period with FK Srbobran, Dokić moved to Spartak Subotica where he passed through the categories. He signed a scholarship contract with the club in 2016, being licensed with the first team for the 2017–18 Serbian SuperLiga season. Dokić made his senior debut for Spartak Subotica in the last season fixture under coach Andrey Chernyshov, replacing Miloš Ostojić in 58 minute of the match against OFK Bačka, played on 21 May 2017. In summer 2017, Dokić moved on a half-season loan deal to Bačka 1901.

== International career ==
Dokić was called into the Serbia national under-16 football team squad in 2016, making an appearance, in matches against Montenegro at the memorial tournament dedicated to Miljan Miljanić. He also made his debut for Serbian U17 national level in a friendly match against Kazakhstan, played on 26 July 2016.

== Career statistics ==
As of 21 December 2017

Appearances and goals by club, season and competition
| Club | Season | League | | | Cup | | Continental | | Other | | Total | |
| Club | Season | Division | Apps | Goals | Apps | Goals | Apps | Goals | Apps | Goals | Apps | Goals |
|---|---|---|---|---|---|---|---|---|---|---|---|---|
| Spartak Subotica | 2016–17 | Serbian SuperLiga | 1 | 0 | 0 | 0 | — | | — | | 1 | 0 |
| Spartak Subotica | 2017–18 | Serbian SuperLiga | 0 | 0 | — | | — | | — | | 0 | 0 |
| Spartak Subotica | Total | | 1 | 0 | 0 | 0 | — | | — | | 1 | 0 |
| Bačka 1901 (loan) | 2017–18 | Serbian League Vojvodina | 3 | 0 | — | | — | | — | | 3 | 0 |
| Career total | | | 4 | 0 | 0 | 0 | — | | — | | 4 | 0 |
