= Sireți =

- Village
- Location within Moldova
- Coordinates: 47.1336°N 28.7142°E
- Country: Moldova
- District: Strășeni District

Government
  - Mayor: Leonid Boaghi (PDM)

Population (2014 census)
  - Total: 5,833
- Time zone: UTC+2 (EET)
  - Summer (DST): UTC+3 (EEST)

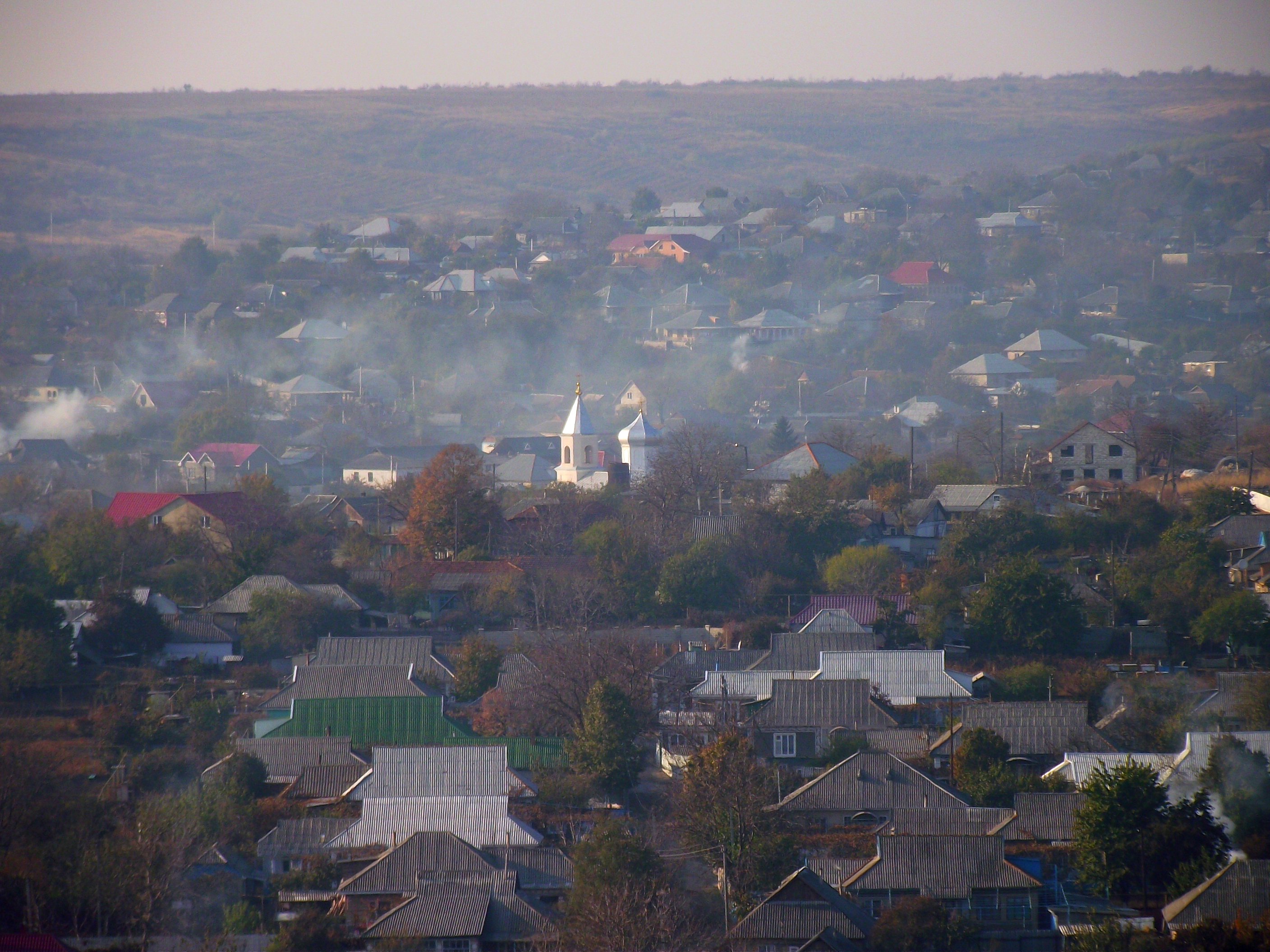
Strășeni District, Moldova

Sireți is a village in Strășeni District, Moldova. Sireți has a population of 5833 people. It is near lake Ghidighici, the largest man-made lake in Moldova.

== Notable people ==
- Alexandra Can (1952–2023), a politician
