= Eduard Blănuță =

Moldovan footballer and manager

Personal information
- Date of birth: 30 March 1971 (age 55)
- Place of birth: Chișinău, Moldavian SSR
- Position: Forward

Managerial career
- Years: Team
- 2012–2017: Petrocub Hîncești
- 2019–2024: Moldova (women)
- 2025: Petrocub Hîncești

Eduard Blănuță (born 30 March 1971) is a Moldovan professional football manager and former player.

== Playing career ==
Blănuță spent his playing career in Moldova and the Czech Republic.

== Managerial career ==
He was the head coach of Petrocub Hîncești between July 2012 and June 2017. (Note: Eduard Blănuță at WorldFootball.net) In December 2019, he was appointed head coach of the Moldova women's national team. (Note: Eduard Blănuță at FootballFacts.ru (in Russian))

== Personal life ==
He is the father of Vladislav Blănuță.
