= Nisporeni Central Stadium =

Football stadium in Nisporeni, Moldova

- Stadionul Central Nisporeni
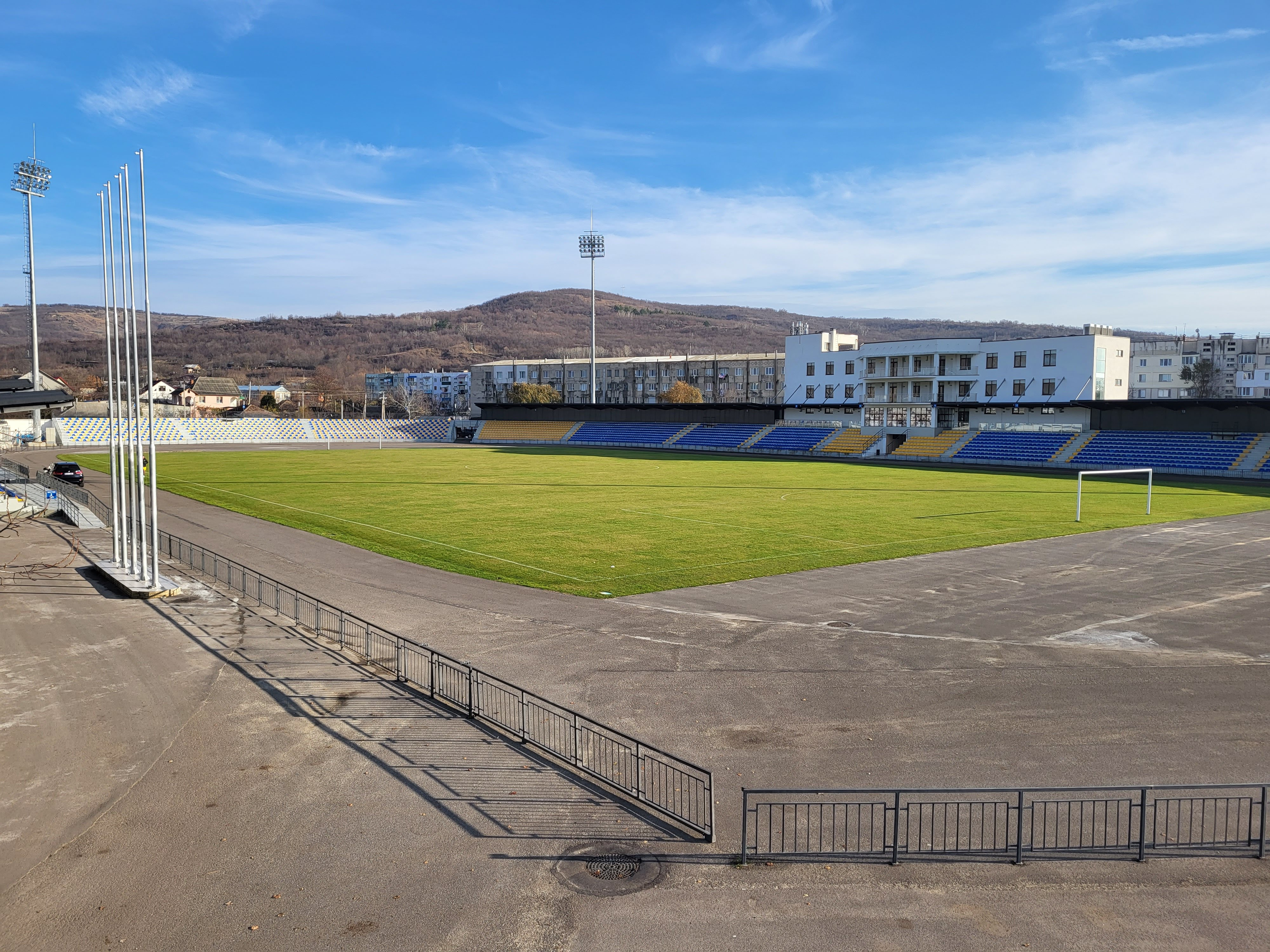
- The stadium in 2023; UEFA
- Interactive map of Nisporeni Central Stadium
- Address: 8 Great National Assembly Street; Nisporeni; Moldova
- Coordinates: 47°04′35.2″N 28°10′45.6″E
- Owner: Nisporeni
- Capacity: 5,200
- Surface: Grass

Construction
- Groundbreaking: 2017
- Opened: 2021

Tenants
- Spartanii Sportul (2024–2025); Dacia Buiucani (2025–present); Real Sireți (2026–present); Moldova national youth football teams (2024–present)

The Nisporeni Central Stadium (Romanian: Stadionul Central Nisporeni), also known as Centru de Tineret și Sport Nisporeni, is a football stadium in Moldova built in 2021. It is based in the city of Nisporeni. It is serves as the home ground for Dacia Buiucani and Real Sireți of the Moldovan Liga.

In 2015 it was announced that another stadium would be built. Construction started in 2017, at a cost of 80 million MDL.

The venue hosted the 2021–22 Moldovan Cup final.

== Gallery ==
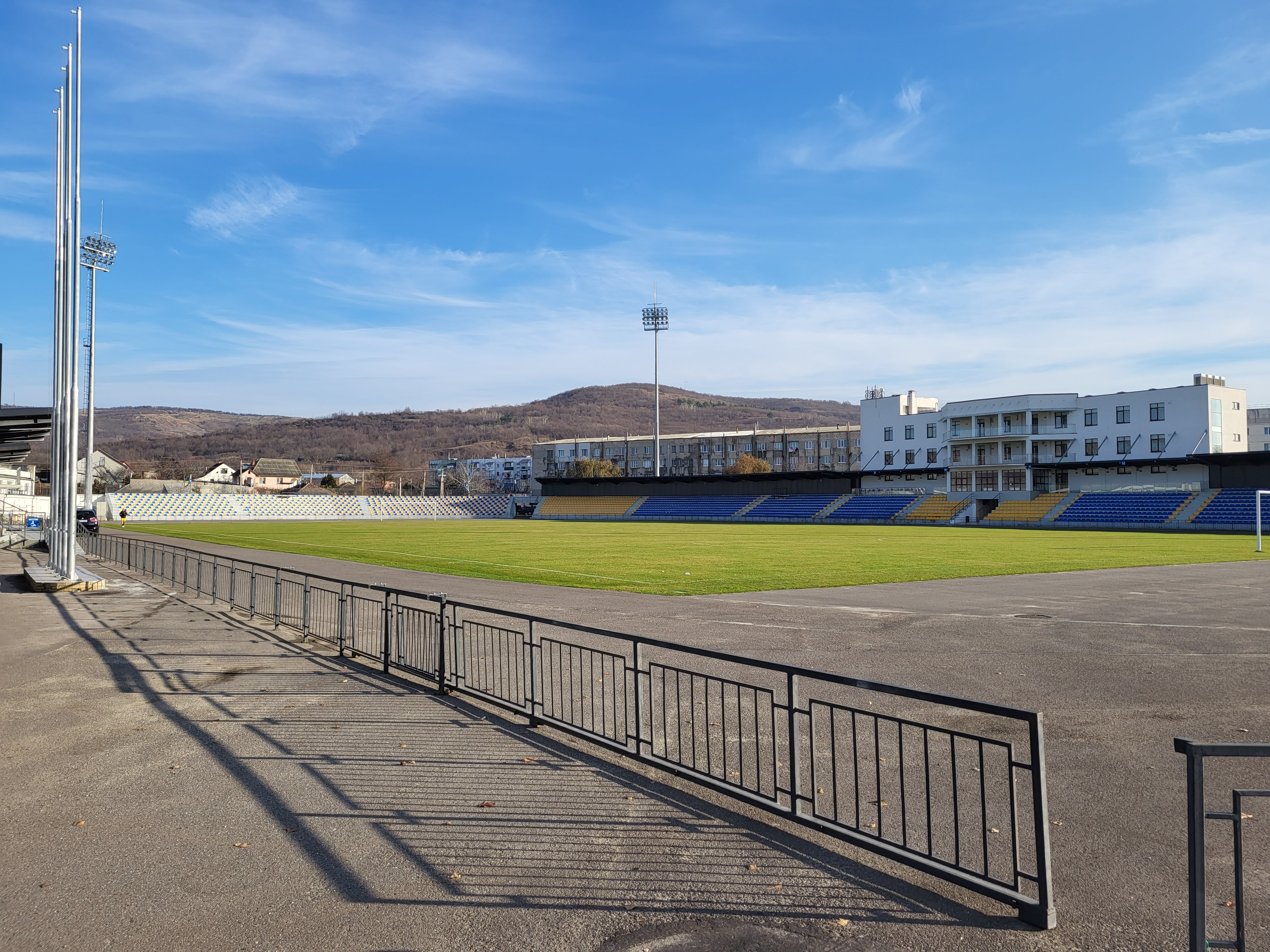

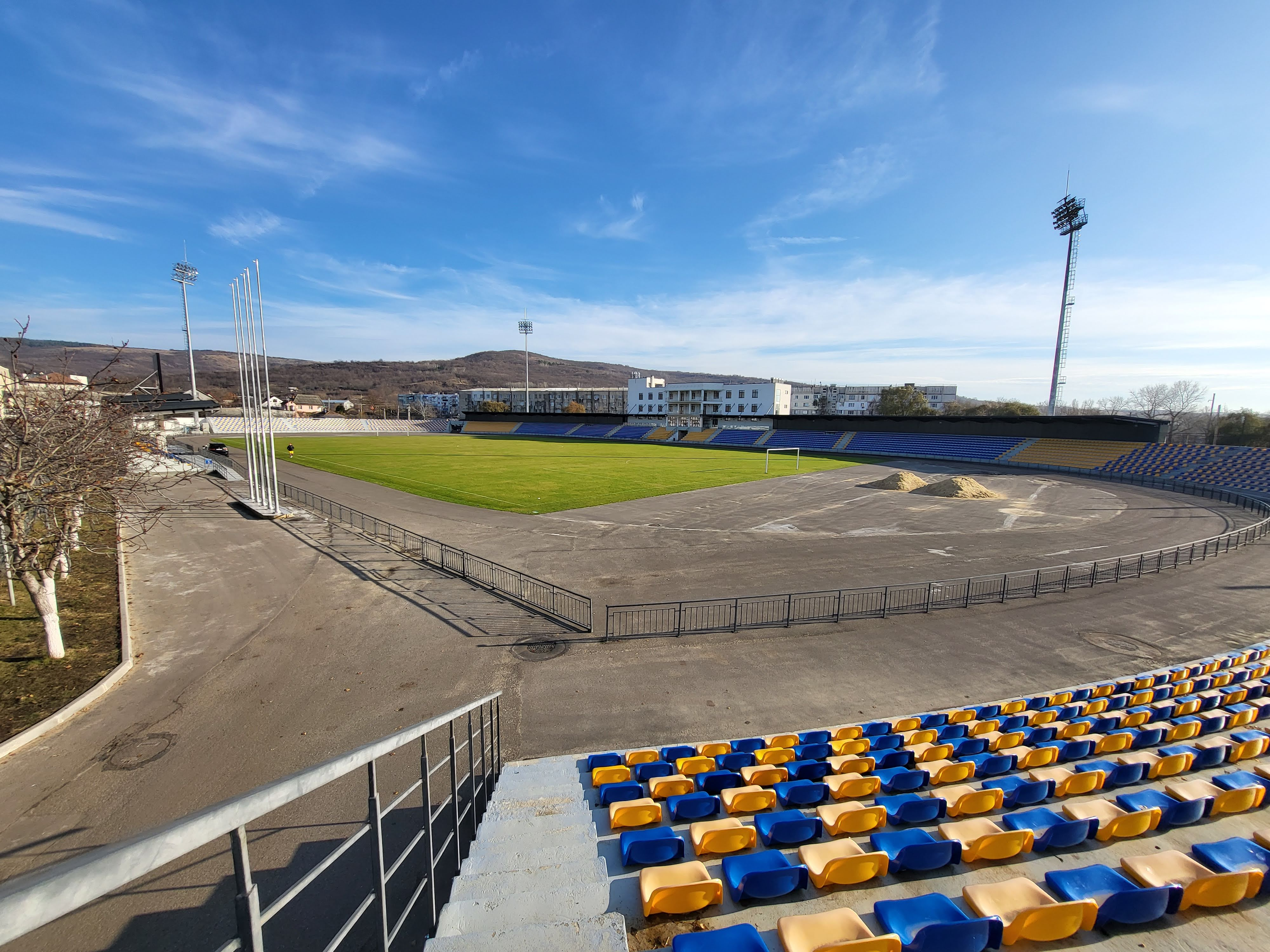
The view from the top row

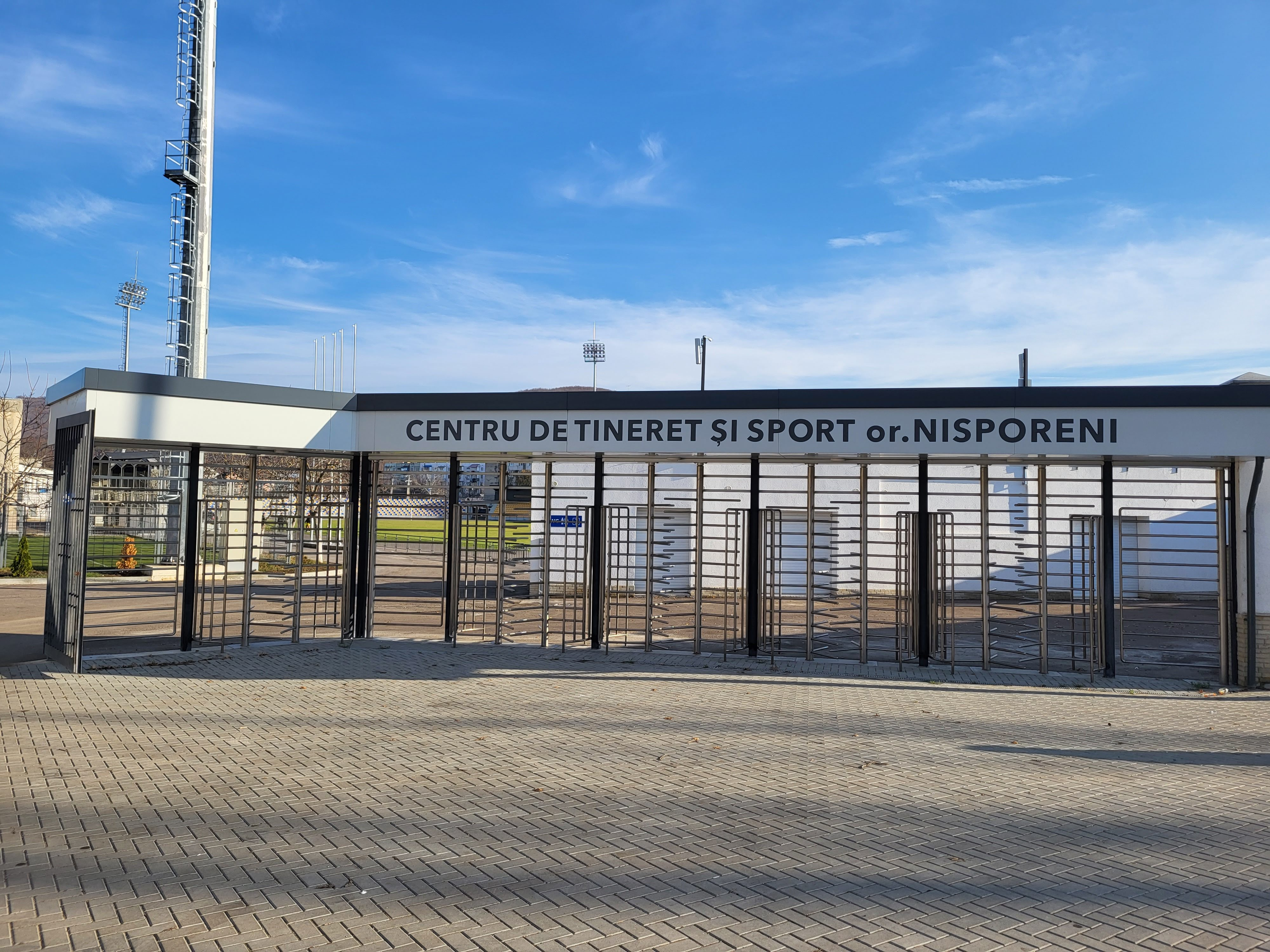
The entrance
