= Victor Mihailov =

Moldovan football coach

Personal information
- Full name: Victor Vasilyevich Mihailov
- Date of birth: 18 December 1981 (age 44)
- Place of birth: Moldova, Soviet Union

Managerial career
- Years: Team
- 2011–2014: Sheriff-2 Tiraspol
- 2014–2024: Sheriff Tiraspol (assistant)
- 2016: Sheriff Tiraspol (interim)
- 2018: Sheriff Tiraspol (interim)
- 2020: Sheriff Tiraspol (interim)
- 2022: Sheriff Tiraspol (interim)
- 2022: Sheriff Tiraspol (interim)
- 2023: Sheriff Tiraspol (interim)
- 2023–2024: Sheriff Tiraspol (interim)
- 2025–2026: Sheriff Tiraspol (interim)

Victor Vasilyevich Mihailov (Russian: Виктор Васильевич Михайлов; born 18 December 1981) is a Moldovan football manager who is the assistant head coach of Moldovan Liga club Sheriff Tiraspol.

== Career ==
In 2011, he was appointed head coach of Sheriff-2 Tiraspol. He obtained a UEFA Pro Licence in August 2012. In January 2014, he was appointed assistant coach of Sheriff Tiraspol under Veaceslav Rusnac. In June 2015, his position was changed from assistant coach to academy coach. In October 2015, he was again appointed assistant coach, this time under Zoran Vulić. He has since alternated between the roles of assistant coach and interim head coach. He was made interim head coach in September 2016 after Bruno Irles left the position, in April 2018 following the resignation of Roberto Bordin, in October 2020 after the termination of Zoran Zekić's contract, in March 2022 following Yuriy Vernydub's departure, and in October 2022 after the resignation of Stjepan Tomas.

== Personal life ==
He also holds Russian citizenship.
