= Veaceslav Rusnac =

Moldovan footballer (born 1975)

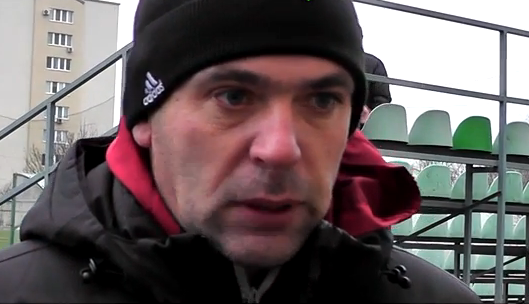
- Rusnac in 2015

Personal information
- Date of birth: 27 August 1975 (age 51)
- Place of birth: Răuțel, Moldavian SSR, Soviet Union
- Height: 1.72 m (5 ft 8 in)
- Position: Defender

Team information
- Current team: Milsami Orhei (head coach)

Senior career*
| Years | Team | Apps | (Gls) |
| 1992–2000 | Olimpia Bălți | 187 | (16) |
| 2000–2001 | Zimbru Chișinău | 14 | (0) |
| 2001 | Olimpia Bălți | 12 | (1) |
| 2001–2004 | Zimbru Chișinău | 25 | (0) |
| 2004–2008 | Shakhter Karagandy | 117 | (5) |

International career
| 1999–2000 | Moldova | 3 | (0) |

Managerial career
- 2009–2010: CSCT Buiucani (youth)
- 2011: Moldova U17
- 2011: Moldova U16
- 2011–2012: Academia-UTM Chișinău
- 2012: Speranța Crihana Veche
- 2012–2013: Iskra-Stal Rîbnița
- 2013: Sheriff Tiraspol (assistant)
- 2013–2014: Sheriff Tiraspol (interim)
- 2014: Sheriff Tiraspol
- 2014–2015: Zimbru Chișinău
- 2015–2016: Zimbru-2 Chișinău
- 2015–2016: Zimbru Chișinău (interim)
- 2015–2016: Moldova U18
- 2016: Moldova U19
- 2016–2017: Zimbru Chișinău
- 2017: Zimbru-2 Chișinău
- 2017–2019: Milsami Orhei
- 2020: Kyzylzhar
- 2022: Moldova U18
- 2022–2026: Bălți
- 2026–: Milsami Orhei
- * Club domestic league appearances and goals

Veaceslav Rusnac (born 27 August 1975) is a Moldovan football manager and former player. He is the current head coach of Moldovan Liga club Milsami Orhei.

== Honours ==
Sheriff Tiraspol

- Moldovan National Division: 2013–14
- Moldovan Cup runner-up: 2013-14
