= 2021–22 Moldovan Cup =

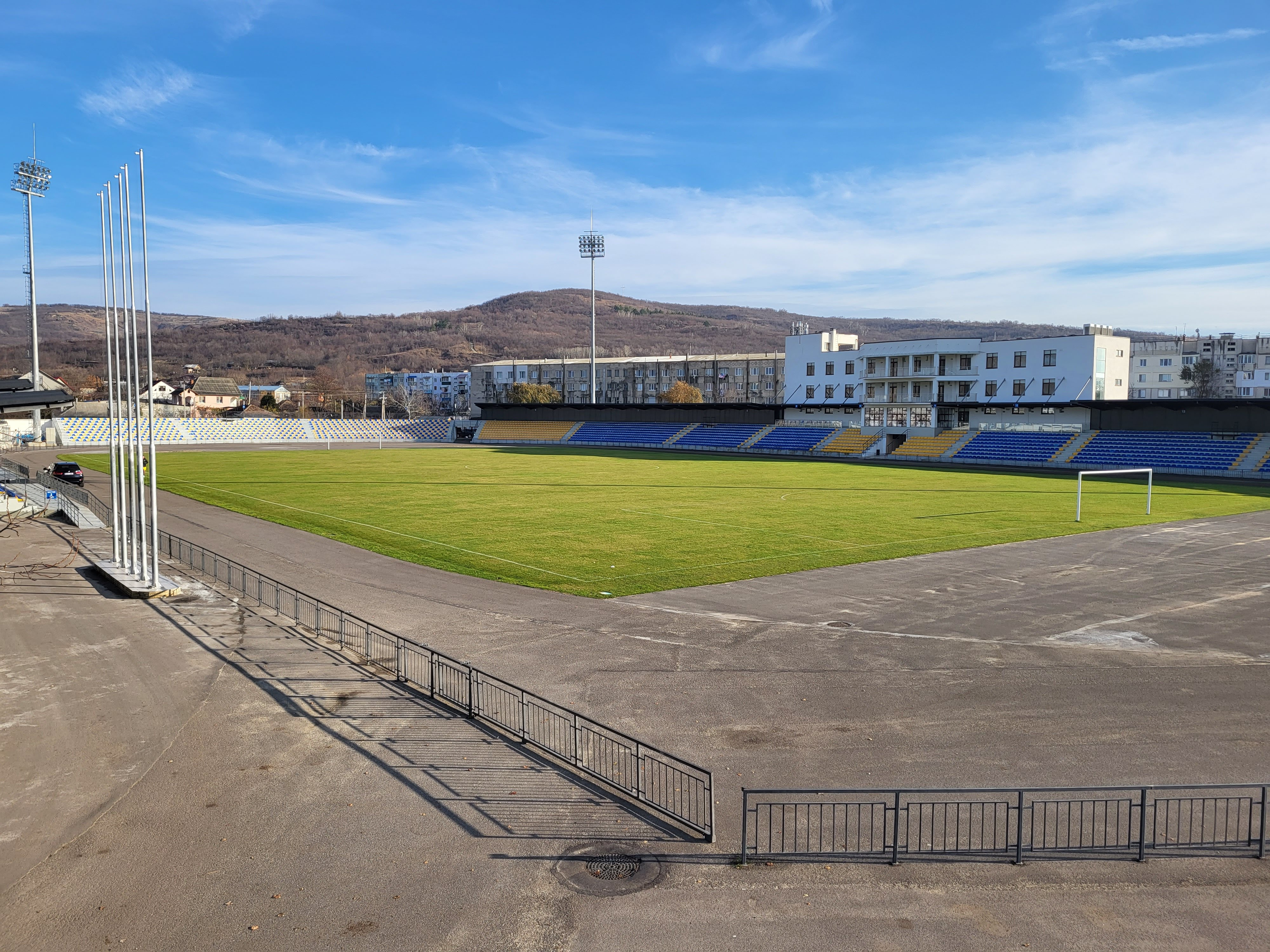
- Nisporeni Stadium hosted the final

Tournament details
- Country: Moldova
- Dates: 17 August 2021 – 21 May 2022
- Teams: 45

Final positions
- Champions: Sheriff Tiraspol
- Runners-up: Sfîntul Gheorghe

Tournament statistics
- Matches played: 40
- Goals scored: 169 (4.23 per match)

The 2021–22 Moldovan Cup (Romanian: Cupa Moldovei) was the 31st season of the annual Moldovan football cup competition. The competition started on 17 August 2021 with the preliminary round and concluded with the final on 21 May 2022.

== Format and Schedule ==
The preliminary round and the first two rounds proper are regionalised to reduce teams travel costs.

Round	Match dates	Fixtures	Clubs
Preliminary Round	17 August 2021	5	45 → 40
First Round	24 August 2021	16	40 → 24
Second Round	14 September 2021	8	24 → 16
Round of 16	26–27 October 2021	8	16 → 8
Quarter-Finals	12–13 April 2022	4	8 → 4
Semi-Finals	26 April 2022	2	4 → 2
Final	21 May 2022	1	2 → 1

== Participating clubs ==
The following teams entered the competition:

Divizia Națională the 8 teams of the 2021–22 season	Divizia A the 11 non-reserve teams of the 2021–22 season	Divizia B the 26 teams of the 2021–22 season
Sfîntul Gheorghe ^{title holder}; Sheriff Tiraspol ^{runner-up}; Petrocub Hîncești; Milsami Orhei; Dinamo-Auto; Florești; Zimbru Chișinău; Bălți	Dacia Buiucani; Cahul-2005; Spartanii Selemet; Sucleia; Speranța Drochia; Olimp Comrat; Iskra Rîbnița; Real Succes; Victoria Chișinău; Sporting Trestieni; FCM Ungheni	Grănicerul Glodeni; Fălești; Saksan; Codru Călărași; Cruiz Plus; Slobozia Mare; Sîngerei; Cricova; Edineț; Socol Copceac; Olimpia Bălți; Inter Soroca; Maiak Chirsova; Pepeni; Văsieni; Cimișlia; Congaz; FC Visoca; Rîșcani; ~~Sinteza Căușeni~~; Atletic Strășeni; EFA Visoca; ARF Ocnița; Oguzsport Comrat; Stăuceni; Steaua Telenești

== Preliminary round ==
10 clubs from the Divizia B entered this round. Teams that finished higher on the league in the previous season played their ties away. 16 clubs from the Divizia B received a bye for the preliminary round. Matches were played on 17 August 2021.

17 August 2021	Stăuceni (3)	w/o	Sinteza Căușeni (3)	Stăuceni
17:30 EEST				Stadium: Olimp Stadium; Referee: Vitalie Cobzac

17 August 2021	EFA Visoca (3)	1–2 (a.e.t.)	ARF Ocnița (3)	Izvoare
17:30 EEST	M. Țurcan 30' (pen.)		D. Bodiu 23' (pen.), 94'	Stadium: Izvoare Stadium; Referee: Vladimir Mortean

17 August 2021	Steaua Telenești (3)	1–3	Rîșcani (3)	Telenești
17:30 EEST	V. Florea 28'		V. Istrati 42'; C. Nedelea 56', 77'	Stadium: Telenești Stadium; Referee: Ivan Tudos

17 August 2021	Oguzsport Comrat (3)	3–5 (a.e.t.)	Congaz (3)	Ceadîr-Lunga
17:30 EEST	A. Mumjiev 1'; G. Statov 14'; O. Pometco 90'		I. Mahu 67', 80' (pen.), 84', 104' (pen.); A. Țihaci 107'	Stadium: Ceadîr-Lunga Stadium; Referee: Gheorghe Dandeș

17 August 2021	Atletic Strășeni (3)	1–2 (a.e.t.)	Cimișlia (3)	Lozova
19:00 EEST	D. Prodan 67'		V. Iepure 90+4'; C. Rotaru 107'	Stadium: Nicolae Simatoc; Referee: Radu Tobultoc

== First round ==
21 clubs from the Divizia B and 11 clubs from the Divizia A entered this round. In a match, the home advantage was granted to the team from the lower league. If two teams are from the same division, the team that finished higher on the league in the previous season played their tie away. Matches were played on 24 August 2021.

24 August 2021	FC Visoca (3)	w/o	Inter Soroca (3)	Soroca
17:00 EEST				Stadium: Soroca Stadium; Referee: Andrei Cuziac

24 August 2021	Sîngerei (3)	3–0	Fălești (3)	Sîngerei
17:00 EEST	V. Andronic 12'; Ș. Muntean 32'; A. Șuleac 42'			Stadium: Sîngerei Stadium; Referee: Alexandru Stefciuc

24 August 2021	Olimpia Bălți (3)	2–1	Grănicerul Glodeni (3)	Natalievca
17:00 EEST	A. Vasilat 9'; D. Cobîlaș 59'		A. Colbasiuc 62'	Stadium: Natalievca Stadium; Referee: Nicolai Bălțătescu

24 August 2021	Pepeni (3)	1–6	Victoria Chișinău (2)	Pepeni
17:00 EEST	D. Stratila 43'		I. Pavlov 27', 48'; A. Ceh 33'; M. Stan 56', 67'; V. Daniliuc 90'	Stadium: Pepeni Stadium; Referee: Nicolae Murzac

24 August 2021	Cruiz Plus (3)	1–0	Iskra Rîbnița (2)	Camenca
17:00 EEST	O. Hromțov 11'			Stadium: Camenca Stadium; Referee: Ghenadie Sidenco

24 August 2021	Codru Călărași (3)	2–3	FCM Ungheni (2)	Călărași
17:00 EEST	C. Gurjui 44'; D. Ciobanu 66'		N. Porojniuc 40'; F. Cojocaru 61'; C. Arama 66'	Stadium: Călărași Stadium; Referee: Ion Orlic

24 August 2021	ARF Ocnița (3)	4–1	Edineț (3)	Edineț
17:00 EEST	D. Bodiu 27' (pen.), 90+3'; S. Babenco 57'; E. Blajco 73'		A. Colibaba 4'	Stadium: Edineț Stadium; Referee: Ivan Tudos

24 August 2021	Rîșcani (3)	0–5	Speranța Drochia (2)	Rîșcani
17:00 EEST			I. Laevschi 48'; P. Stînga 53'; I. Lacusta 65', 88'; V. Noroc 75'	Stadium: Rîșcani Stadium; Referee: Vladimir Mortean

24 August 2021	Congaz (3)	0–6	Olimp Comrat (2)	Congaz
17:00 EEST			S. Dobrioglo 20'; C. Bargan 38'; R. Rostokin 54'; E. Borovschi 70', 73'; S. Gheorghiev 90'	Stadium: Congaz Stadium; Referee: Andrei Ghetmanciuc

24 August 2021	Stăuceni (3)	1–3	Real Succes (2)	Stăuceni
17:00 EEST	L. Morari 79'		V. Luchiță 15'; G. Platovschi 52'; S. Chele 89'	Stadium: Olimp Stadium; Referee: Grigore Ciugui

24 August 2021	Cimișlia (3)	0–1	Sporting Trestieni (2)	Cimișlia
17:00 EEST			E. Avram 31' (pen.)	Stadium: Cimișlia Stadium; Referee: Victor Bughenco

24 August 2021	Saksan (3)	4–2	Sucleia (2)	Ceadîr-Lunga
17:00 EEST	D. Vornișel 16', 48', 76'; A. Diordiev 68'		G. Gohou 58'; F. Abolaji 85' (pen.)	Stadium: Ceadîr-Lunga Stadium; Referee: Andrei Cojocaru

24 August 2021	Slobozia Mare (3)	2–3	Cahul-2005 (2)	Slobozia Mare
17:00 EEST	V. Iuraș 49'; M. Borza 81'		D. Putregai 16'; V. Mîță 19'; M. Soltanici 58'	Stadium: Slobozia Mare Stadium; Referee: Piotr Ialamov

24 August 2021	Maiak Chirsova (3)	5–0	Socol Copceac (3)	Chirsova
17:00 EEST	F. Boicev 66', 70', 90'; D. Mihuță 77', 85'			Stadium: Chirsova Stadium; Referee: Iurie Covtun

24 August 2021	Cricova (3)	1–2	Dacia Buiucani (2)	Cricova
17:00 EEST	I. Godoroja 2'		D. Bivol 8'; D. Dosca 85'	Stadium: Cricova Stadium; Referee: Oleg Stoianov

24 August 2021	Văsieni (3)	0–3	Spartanii Selemet (2)	Văsieni
17:00 EEST			N. Cebotari 14'; I. Sandu 65' (pen.); R. Șumchin 68'	Stadium: Văsieni Stadium; Referee: Igor Boșca

== Second round ==
The 16 winners from the previous round entered this round. In a match, the home advantage was granted to the team from the lower league. If two teams are from the same division, the team that finished higher on the league in the previous season played their tie away. Matches were played on 14 September 2021.

14 September 2021	Olimpia Bălți (3)	1–3	Sîngerei (3)	Natalievca
16:00 EEST	A. Mateițov 77'		D. Maga 13'; A. Șuleac 19'; V. Sinegur 23'	Stadium: Natalievca Stadium; Referee: Andrei Cuziac

14 September 2021	Inter Soroca (3)	0–1	Victoria Chișinău (2)	Soroca
16:00 EEST			O. Molla 73'	Stadium: Soroca Stadium; Referee: Alexandru Stefciuc

14 September 2021	Cruiz Plus (3)	1–4	FCM Ungheni (2)	Camenca
16:00 EEST	A. Pașcenco 19'		D. Barbacaru 15'; V. Șobraneschi 54'; C. Arama 60'; F. Cojocaru 89'	Stadium: Camenca Stadium; Referee: Ivan Tudos

14 September 2021	ARF Ocnița (3)	0–4	Speranța Drochia (2)	Edineț
16:00 EEST			V. Lisa 2'; E. Tihonciuc 19' (o.g.); I. Lacusta 60'; D. Caras 66'	Stadium: Edineț Stadium; Referee: Veaceslav Morgun

14 September 2021	Real Succes (2)	1–8	Olimp Comrat (2)	Chișinău
16:00 EEST	N. Malțev 87'		R. Rostokin 9', 14', 22'; C. Bargan 18'; S. Dobrioglo 23'; M. Botnarenco 62', 67'; V. Haritov 89'	Stadium: CS Real Succes Stadium; Referee: Valeriu Minciună

14 September 2021	Saksan (3)	3–2 (a.e.t.)	Sporting Trestieni (2)	Ceadîr-Lunga
16:00 EEST	A. Diordiev 34', 83', 98'		V. Zalenschi 12', 75'	Stadium: Ceadîr-Lunga Stadium; Referee: Oleg Stoianov

14 September 2021	Maiak Chirsova (3)	2–4	Cahul-2005 (2)	Chirsova
16:00 EEST	D. Mihuță 58', 81'		I. Guștiuc 62'; P. Sofronovici 70'; I. Stancev 74', 78'	Stadium: Chirsova Stadium; Referee: Andrei Ghetmanciuc

14 September 2021	Spartanii Selemet (2)	2–0 (a.e.t.)	Dacia Buiucani (2)	Selemet
16:00 EEST	I. Mamaliga 96' (pen.); D. Adam 100'			Stadium: Selemet Stadium; Referee: Andrei Cojocaru

== Final stage ==
=== Bracket ===
Round of 16
Speranța Drochia	1
Zimbru Chișinău	4
Milsami Orhei	5
FCM Ungheni	1
Sfîntul Gheorghe	1
Victoria Chișinău	0
Florești	3
Sîngerei	1
Bălți	w/o
Cahul-2005	—
Spartanii Selemet	1
Dinamo-Auto	3
Sheriff Tiraspol	6
Saksan	0
Petrocub Hîncești	6
Olimp Comrat	0

Quarter-finals
Zimbru Chișinău	0
Milsami Orhei	3
Sfîntul Gheorghe	w/o
Florești	—
Bălți	3 (3)
Dinamo-Auto (a.e.t.) (p)	3 (4)
Sheriff Tiraspol	4
Petrocub Hîncești	0

Semi-finals
Milsami Orhei	0
Sfîntul Gheorghe	2
Dinamo-Auto	2
Sheriff Tiraspol	3

Final
Sfîntul Gheorghe	0
Sheriff Tiraspol	1

== Round of 16 ==
The 8 winners from the previous round and 8 clubs from the Divizia Națională entered this round. The home teams and the pairs were determined in a draw held on 20 September 2021. Matches were played on 26 and 27 October 2021.

26 October 2021	Sfîntul Gheorghe (1)	1–0	Victoria Chișinău (2)	Chișinău
13:00 EEST	Plămădeală 8'	Report		Stadium: Zimbru-2; Attendance: 100; Referee: Igor Boșca

26 October 2021	Petrocub Hîncești (1)	6–0	Olimp Comrat (2)	Sărata-Galbenă
13:00 EEST	Bogaciuc 28', 65'; Gulceac 63', 67', 83'; S. Plătică 85'	Report		Stadium: Sărata-Galbenă Stadium; Attendance: 100; Referee: Andrei Breguța

26 October 2021	Spartanii Selemet (2)	1–3	Dinamo-Auto (1)	Selemet
13:00 EEST	N. Murovanîi 79'	Report	Cemîrtan 21'; Gaiu 48', 61'	Stadium: Selemet Stadium; Attendance: 50; Referee: Petru Stoianov

26 October 2021	Bălți (1)	w/o	Cahul-2005 (2)	Bălți
15:00 EEST				Stadium: Bălți Stadium

27 October 2021	Florești (1)	3–1	Sîngerei (3)	Bender
13:00 EEST	I. Danilov 8'; I. Amobi 15'; A. Pistol 21' (o.g.)	Report	V. Corcodel 90+1'	Stadium: Bender Stadium; Attendance: 20; Referee: Stanislav Leu

27 October 2021	Speranța Drochia (2)	1–4	Zimbru Chișinău (1)	Drochia
13:00 EEST	Lacusta 58'	Report	A. Ciopa 27'; Kuittinen 41'; O. Ebenezer 51'; Cociuc 76' (pen.)	Stadium: Drochia Stadium; Attendance: 200; Referee: Ghenadie Sidenco

27 October 2021	Milsami Orhei (1)	5–1	FCM Ungheni (2)	Orhei
15:00 EEST	S. Nazar 7'; Pîslă 51', 90'; Istrati 71'; A. Antoniuc 77'	Report	C. Arama 46'	Stadium: CSR Orhei; Attendance: 200; Referee: Ion Bilea

27 October 2021	Sheriff Tiraspol (1)	6–0	Saksan (3)	Tiraspol
15:00 EEST	Castañeda 12'; Dago 22'; Khalid 26', 56'; Addo 44'; Cojocaru 60'	Report		Stadium: Sheriff small Arena; Attendance: 300; Referee: Dumitru Muntean

== Quarter-finals ==
The 8 winners from the previous round entered the quarter-finals. The home teams were determined in a draw held on 29 October 2021. Matches were played on 12 and 13 April 2022.

12 April 2022	Sfîntul Gheorghe (1)	w/o	Florești (1)	Chișinău
16:00 EEST				Stadium: Zimbru-2

12 April 2022	Sheriff Tiraspol (1)	4–0	Petrocub Hîncești (1)	Tiraspol
18:00 EEST	Pernambuco 16'; Badolo 23' (pen.), 83'; Bruno 85'	Report		Stadium: Sheriff small Arena; Attendance: 320; Referee: Gabriel Tupicica

13 April 2022	Zimbru Chișinău (1)	0–3	Milsami Orhei (1)	Chișinău
16:00 EEST		Report	Istrati 26'; Lambarschi 28'; Camara 86'	Stadium: Zimbru Stadium; Attendance: 128; Referee: Veaceslav Banari

13 April 2022	Bălți (1)	3–3 (a.e.t.) (3–4 p)	Dinamo-Auto (1)	Bălți
18:00 EEST	E. Alaribe 79'; W. Taira 99'; N. Gubin 103' (o.g.)	Report	O. Bulat 31'; M. Căruntu 101' (pen.), 118'	Stadium: Bălți Stadium; Attendance: 1,100; Referee: Petru Stoianov
	Penalties
	Furtună (penalty scored); Moțpan (penalty scored); Á. Bely (penalty scored); W. Taira (penalty missed); Randriambololona (penalty missed)		(penalty scored) Cojocari; (penalty scored) Cemîrtan; (penalty scored) E. Pleșco; (penalty scored) A. Cuzmenco; (penalty missed) M. Căruntu

== Semi-finals ==
The 4 winners from the previous round entered the semi-finals. The home teams were determined in a draw held on 15 April 2022. Matches were played on 26 April 2022.

26 April 2022	Dinamo-Auto (1)	2–3	Sheriff Tiraspol (1)	Tîrnauca
16:00 EEST	O. Bulat 45'; Bursuc 79'	Report	Badolo 9', 35'; Pernambuco 41'	Stadium: Dinamo-Auto; Attendance: 120; Referee: Dumitru Muntean

26 April 2022	Milsami Orhei (1)	0–2	Sfîntul Gheorghe (1)	Chișinău
19:00 EEST		Report	Ghecev 35'; J. Ibrahim 90'	Stadium: Zimbru Stadium; Attendance: 500; Referee: Roman Jitari

== Final ==
The final was played on Saturday 21 May 2022 at the Nisporeni Central Stadium in Nisporeni. The "home" team (for administrative purposes) was determined by an additional draw held on 28 April 2022.

21 May 2022
20:00 EEST

Sfîntul Gheorghe	0–1	Sheriff Tiraspol
	Report	Lushkja 90+5'

Nisporeni Stadium, Nisporeni
Attendance: 4,500
Referee: Igor Boșca (Moldova)

Sf. Gheorghe	Sheriff

GK	25	(Moldova) Nicolae Calancea
DF	4	(Moldova) Artiom Litveacov
DF	8	(Moldova) Alexandru Osipov
DF	17	(Moldova) Petru Ojog
DF	18	(Ukraine) Yevhen Smirnov	(yellow card) 69'
DF	24	(Cameroon) Cedric Ngah
MF	7	(Moldova) Alexandru Suvorov (c)	(yellow card) 86'	(substituted off) 90+1'
MF	13	(Moldova) Teodor Lungu
MF	15	(Nigeria) Maxmillian İhekuna
MF	23	(Moldova) Ilie Damașcan		(substituted off) 75'
FW	10	(Moldova) Mihail Ghecev	(yellow card) 69'
Substitutes:
GK	1	(Moldova) Maxim Railean
DF	3	(Moldova) Mihail Ștefan
DF	19	(Moldova) Serghei Svinarenco
MF	14	(Moldova) Dan Pușcaș
MF	22	(Moldova) Daniel Lisu
MF	32	(Moldova) Vadim Paireli		(substituted on) 75'
MF	99	(Moldova) Calin Calaidjoglu
FW	11	(Nigeria) Jibril Ibrahim
FW	88	(Moldova) Nicolai Solodovnicov		(substituted on) 90+1'
Head Coach:
(Moldova) Nicolai Mandrîcenco

GK	40	(Ghana) Razak Abalora
DF	2	(Ghana) Patrick Kpozo
DF	6	(Bosnia and Herzegovina) Stjepan Radeljić
DF	41	(Greece) Stefanos Evangelou		(substituted off) 90+1'
DF	55	(Peru) Gustavo Dulanto (c)
MF	18	(Mali) Moussa Kyabou
MF	22	(Albania) Regi Lushkja	(yellow card) 90+5'
MF	88	(Burkina Faso) Cedric Badolo	(yellow card) 62'
FW	9	(Mali) Adama Traoré	(yellow card) 77'
FW	28	(Brazil) Pernambuco		(substituted off) 69'
FW	77	(Brazil) Bruno Felipe
Substitutes:
GK	1	(Moldova) Dumitru Celeadnic
GK	33	(Moldova) Serghei Pașcenco
DF	3	(Malawi) Charles Petro		(substituted on) 90+1'
DF	16	(Trinidad and Tobago) Keston Julien
MF	19	(Moldova) Serafim Cojocari
MF	20	(North Macedonia) Boban Nikolov
MF	31	(Luxembourg) Sébastien Thill
FW	23	(Kazakhstan) Danil Ankudinov
FW	99	(Guinea) Momo Yansané		(substituted on) 69'
Head Coach:
(Moldova) Victor Mihailov

Assistant referees:
Vladislav Lifciu (Moldova)
Victor Mardari (Moldova)
Additional assistant referees:
Roman Jitari (Moldova)
Ion Bîlea (Moldova)
Fourth official:
Vadim Vicol (Moldova)

Match rules

- 90 minutes.
- 30 minutes of extra time if necessary.
- Penalty shoot-out if score is still level.
- Eleven named substitutes.
- Maximum of five substitutions, with a sixth allowed in extra time.
