= Lacusta =

Lacusta is a surname. Notable people with the surname include:

- Deb Lacusta (fl. 1984), American television writer and actress
- Ivan Lacusta (born 1995), Moldovan-Romanian footballer
