= FC Speranis Nisporeni =

Association football club in Moldova

Speranis Nisporeni
- Full name: FC Speranis Nisporeni
- Founded: 20 March 2019; 7 years ago
- Dissolved: 2025
- Ground: Stadionul Mircea Eliade

FC Speranis Nisporeni was a Moldovan football club based in Nisporeni. They last played in the Moldovan Liga 1, the second tier of Moldovan football. They merged into Oguz Comrat before the 2025–26 season.

== History ==
The club was founded on 20 March 2019. It was founded as FC Sporting Trestieni and started playing in the third tier. In 2021, the club earned promotion to the second tier. In the summer of 2022, the club was renamed FC Speranis Nisporeni.

== Honours ==
- Divizia B

Winners (1): 2020–21

== List of seasons ==
Season	League									Cup	Ref
Season	Division	Pos	Pld	W	D	L	GF	GA	Pts	Cup	Ref
2019	Divizia B (South)	2nd	14	9	3	2	40	10	30	Round of 16	
2020–21	Divizia B (South)	↑ 1st	22	19	2	1	92	7	59	Round of 16	
2021–22	Divizia A	5th	22	12	0	10	31	31	36	Second round	
