= 2020–21 Moldovan "B" Division =

Divizia B
- Season: 2020–21
- Dates: 22 August 2020 – 3 July 2021

The 2020–21 Moldovan "B" Division (Romanian: Divizia B) was the 30th season of Moldovan football's third-tier league. The season started on 22 August 2020 and ended on 3 July 2021. The league consisted of two regional groups, Nord (North) and Sud (South).

== North ==
| Pos | Team | Pld | W | D | L | GF | GA | GD | Pts | Promotion or relegation |
|---|---|---|---|---|---|---|---|---|---|---|
| 1 | FCM Ungheni (C, P) | 22 | 16 | 6 | 0 | 93 | 13 | +80 | 54 | Promotion to Divizia A |
| 2 | Codru-Juniori | 22 | 15 | 4 | 3 | 49 | 19 | +30 | 49 | |
| 3 | Cruiz Plus | 22 | 14 | 3 | 5 | 53 | 28 | +25 | 45 | |
| 4 | Sîngerei | 22 | 13 | 4 | 5 | 64 | 34 | +30 | 43 | |
| 5 | Edineț | 22 | 11 | 7 | 4 | 55 | 25 | +30 | 40 | |
| 6 | Olimpia Bălți | 22 | 9 | 5 | 8 | 38 | 44 | −6 | 32 | |
| 7 | Inter Soroca | 22 | 8 | 6 | 8 | 59 | 53 | +6 | 30 | |
| 8 | Pepeni | 22 | 9 | 0 | 13 | 39 | 57 | −18 | 27 | |
| 9 | Bogzești | 22 | 6 | 1 | 15 | 23 | 50 | −27 | 19 | Expelled (Note: Bogzești failed to arrive for their 2nd and 18th Round games and subsequently were expelled from the competition. The remaining fixtures are awarded 0–3 against them.) |
| 10 | Visoca | 22 | 5 | 1 | 16 | 33 | 62 | −29 | 16 | |
| 11 | Rîșcani | 22 | 3 | 3 | 16 | 24 | 72 | −48 | 12 | |
| 12 | Mănoilești (R) | 22 | 1 | 4 | 17 | 23 | 96 | −73 | 7 | Relegation to regional level |

Source: FMF, Soccerway
Rules for classification: 1) Points; 2) Head-to-head points; 3) Head-to-head goal difference; 4) Head-to-head away goals scored; 5) Head-to-head goals scored; 6) Matches won; 7) Goal difference; 8) Goals scored; 9) Less red cards; 10) Less yellow cards.
(C) Champions; (P) Promoted; (R) Relegated

=== Results ===
Teams will play each other twice (once home, once away).

| Home \ Away | BOG | COD | CRU | EDI | INT | MĂN | OLI | PEP | RÎȘ | SÎN | UNG | VIS |
|---|---|---|---|---|---|---|---|---|---|---|---|---|
| Bogzești | — | 0–4 | 0–3 | 2–2 | 1–0 | 1–0 | 1–0 | 1–3 | 2–1 | 0–3 (Note: Technical wins/losses) | 2–4 | 2–3 |
| Codru-Juniori | 5–0 | — | 2–1 | 1–0 | 3–2 | 2–0 | 4–1 | 2–0 | 2–1 | 1–2 | 0–1 | 2–0 |
| Cruiz Plus | 3–0 (Note: Bogzești was awarded a technical loss against Cruiz Plus due to their failure to appear at their round 2 match) | 2–0 | — | 1–0 | 2–2 | 6–1 | 0–2 | 3–0 | 4–0 | 1–0 | 1–1 | 2–0 |
| Edineț | 3–0 (Note: Bogzești was awarded a technical loss against Edineț due to their failure to appear at their round 18 match) | 1–1 | 1–1 | — | 2–2 | 9–0 | 4–1 | 3–1 | 6–0 | 4–2 | 0–0 | 2–1 |
| Inter Soroca | 1–4 | 2–3 | 3–2 | 0–3 (Note: The match was not played. The home team was not able to provide security services for the game. Awarded a 3–0 technical victory to Edineț.) | — | 7–2 | 6–0 | 0–2 | 4–3 | 3–3 | 1–1 | 8–1 |
| Mănoilești | 2–0 | 1–8 | 2–5 | 0–0 | 4–4 | — | 0–3 (Note: Mănoilești received a 0–3 technical loss in a home game against Olimpia for fielding a disqualified player. The original match ended in a 1–0 victory for Olimpia.) | 1–2 | 0–0 | 0–6 | 0–10 | 1–4 |
| Olimpia Bălți | 1–0 | 2–2 | 1–2 | 1–1 | 1–3 | 5–4 | — | 3–1 | 2–0 | 3–1 | 1–3 | 1–0 |
| Pepeni | 2–5 | 1–3 | 0–1 | 1–4 | 4–3 | 2–1 | 5–2 | — | 1–0 | 2–6 | 2–5 | 4–2 |
| Rîșcani | 3–0 | 0–1 | 1–5 | 0–3 | 1–1 | 3–3 | 2–3 | 5–3 | — | 0–5 | 0–9 | 2–0 |
| Sîngerei | 1–0 | 2–2 | 2–1 | 4–0 | 2–3 | 7–0 | 2–2 | 4–2 | 5–2 | — | 0–4 | 3–2 |
| FCM Ungheni | 3–0 | 0–0 | 8–1 | 3–2 | 8–1 | 9–0 | 1–1 | 3–0 | 8–0 | 1–1 | — | 5–0 |
| Visoca | 3–2 | 0–1 | 2–6 | 3–5 | 1–3 | 3–1 | 2–2 | 0–1 | 5–0 | 1–3 | 0–6 | — |

Source: FMF (in Romanian)
Legend: Blue = home team win; Yellow = draw; Red = away team win.

== South ==
| Pos | Team | Pld | W | D | L | GF | GA | GD | Pts | Promotion or relegation |
|---|---|---|---|---|---|---|---|---|---|---|
| 1 | Sporting Trestieni (C, P) | 22 | 19 | 2 | 1 | 92 | 7 | +85 | 59 | Promotion to Divizia A |
| 2 | Saksan | 22 | 18 | 3 | 1 | 93 | 26 | +67 | 57 | |
| 3 | Slobozia Mare | 22 | 13 | 1 | 8 | 53 | 54 | −1 | 40 | |
| 4 | Cricova | 22 | 12 | 3 | 7 | 42 | 33 | +9 | 39 (Note: Cricova ahead of Ialoveni on head-to-head goal difference: Cricova : +2, Ialoveni : –2.) | |
| 5 | ARF Ialoveni | 22 | 12 | 3 | 7 | 51 | 37 | +14 | 39 | withdrew (Note: ARF Ialoveni completed the season but withdrew from the league prior to the start of the next season.) |
| 6 | Socol Copceac | 22 | 10 | 2 | 10 | 35 | 42 | −7 | 32 | |
| 7 | Maiak Chirsova | 22 | 8 | 3 | 11 | 42 | 40 | +2 | 27 | |
| 8 | Văsieni | 22 | 6 | 8 | 8 | 28 | 39 | −11 | 26 | |
| 9 | Cimișlia | 22 | 6 | 5 | 11 | 27 | 40 | −13 | 23 | |
| 10 | Congaz | 22 | 6 | 4 | 12 | 33 | 50 | −17 | 22 | |
| 11 | Sinteza Căușeni | 22 | 3 | 1 | 18 | 25 | 64 | −39 | 10 | withdrew (Note: Sinteza Căușeni completed the season but withdrew from the league prior to the start of the next season.) |
| 12 | Academia Viitorul | 22 | 1 | 1 | 20 | 12 | 101 | −89 | 4 | Expelled (Note: Academia Viitorul failed to arrive for their 10th and 19th Round games and subsequently were expelled from the competition. The remaining fixtures are awarded 0–3 against them.) |

Source: FMF, Soccerway
Rules for classification: 1) Points; 2) Head-to-head points; 3) Head-to-head goal difference; 4) Head-to-head away goals scored; 5) Head-to-head goals scored; 6) Matches won; 7) Goal difference; 8) Goals scored; 9) Less red cards; 10) Less yellow cards.
(C) Champions; (P) Promoted

=== Results ===
Teams will play each other twice (once home, once away).

| Home \ Away | ACA | CIM | CON | CRI | IAL | MAI | SAK | SIN | SLO | SOC | SPO | VĂS |
|---|---|---|---|---|---|---|---|---|---|---|---|---|
| Academia Viitorul | — | 0–3 (Note: Technical wins/losses) | 1–2 | 1–5 | 0–5 | 1–5 | 0–3 | 0–5 | 2–4 | 3–2 | 0–5 | 0–5 |
| Cimișlia | 3–0 (Note: Academia was awarded a technical loss against Cimișlia due to their failure to appear at their round 10 match) | — | 2–2 | 2–2 | 2–2 | 1–3 | 0–0 | 1–0 | 1–2 | 0–3 (Note: Cimișlia received a 0–3 technical loss in a home game against Socol for fielding an ineligible player. The original match ended in a 2–2 draw.) | 0–4 | 1–1 |
| Congaz | 4–1 | 2–0 | — | 1–1 | 2–3 | 2–1 | 3–3 | 5–2 | 1–2 | 0–1 | 0–0 | 2–3 |
| Cricova | 4–0 | 2–0 | 3–0 | — | 0–1 | 4–1 | 1–5 | 1–0 | 5–0 | 1–0 | 0–5 | 2–0 |
| ARF Ialoveni | 5–1 | 2–1 | 2–0 | 1–4 | — | 2–1 | 1–2 | 3–0 | 3–0 | 4–2 | 0–4 | 6–2 |
| Maiak Chirsova | 6–0 | 1–2 | 4–1 | 5–0 | 2–2 | — | 1–3 | 4–1 | 4–1 | 0–0 | 0–4 | 0–0 |
| Saksan | 11–0 | 4–1 | 5–2 | 6–3 | 3–0 | 3–2 | — | 13–1 | 11–1 | 2–0 | 2–1 | 3–1 |
| Sinteza Căușeni | 3–0 | 1–2 | 1–2 | 0–1 | 2–3 | 0–1 | 1–6 | — | 0–3 | 3–4 | 0–7 | 2–0 |
| Slobozia Mare | 11–2 | 0–3 | 2–1 | 2–1 | 4–3 | 2–1 | 1–3 | 3–1 | — | 5–2 | 1–1 | 2–0 |
| Socol Copceac | 3–0 (Note: Academia was awarded a technical loss against Socol due to their failure to appear at their round 19 match) | 2–1 | 3–0 | 1–2 | 2–1 | 3–0 | 0–2 | 2–1 | 1–4 | — | 0–4 | 0–0 |
| Sporting Trestieni | 7–0 | 4–0 | 8–0 | 2–0 | 2–1 | 5–0 | 4–1 | 2–0 | 4–1 | 9–1 | — | 9–0 |
| Văsieni | 0–0 | 3–1 | 2–1 | 0–0 | 1–1 | 3–0 | 2–2 | 1–1 | 4–2 | 0–3 | 0–1 | — |

Source: FMF (in Romanian)
Legend: Blue = home team win; Yellow = draw; Red = away team win.
