= Vasile Adam =

Moldovan woodworker

- Born: 10 October 1956; Nisporeni, Moldavian SSR, Soviet Union
- Known for: Woodcarving
- Notable work: Romanian People's Salvation Cross (partially)
- Awards: Order of Saints Peter and Paul 1st Grade
- Website: www.vasileadam.info.md

Vasile Adam (born 10 October 1956) is a Moldovan woodcarver known for furniture-making and icons.

== Career ==
His works are mostly traditional woodworking. Artist has a workshop (from 1996) in his native town in which he provide integrated courses of the woodcarving. Also Vasile Adam works predominantly for private clients. His creations and projects are spread among national collections as well as international ones.

Major works of the artist was donated to chapel of Romanian People's Salvation Cross and to monastery 'Ciuflea' located in Chișinău.

In his career, the woodworker tried different techniques and traditions in art, including sculpture. One of his stone creations is a monument to the Soviet heroes, who have died during World War II. The monument rises over the German town Templin.

Adam is a member of Handicraftsmen's union of Moldova and Academy of Traditional Arts (Sibiu, Romania)

== Selected works ==
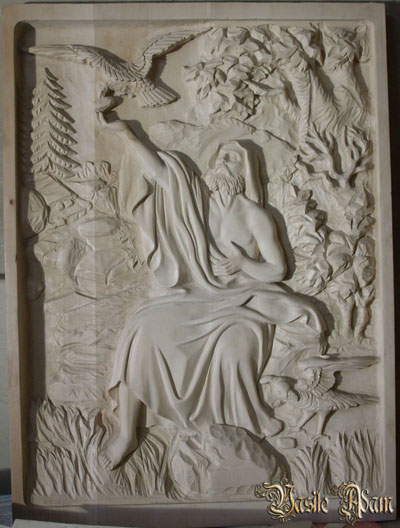
Saint Ylie

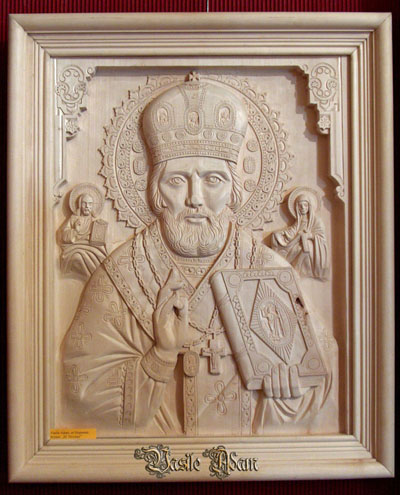
Saint Nicholas

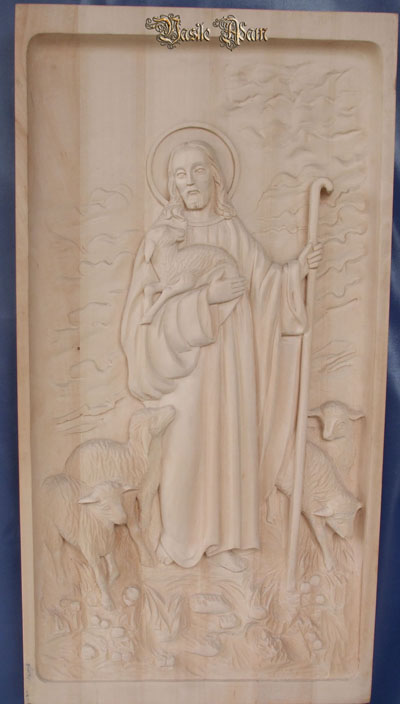
Jesus Christ among lambs

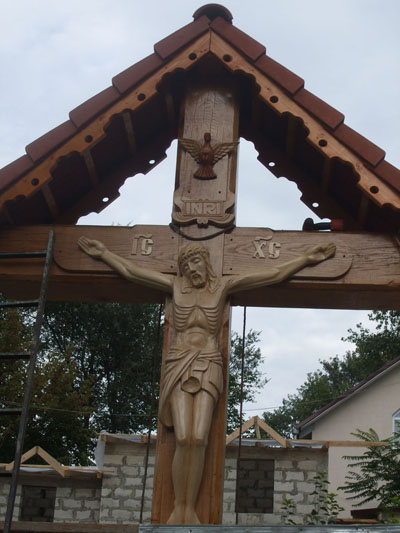
Outdoor wooden crucifix

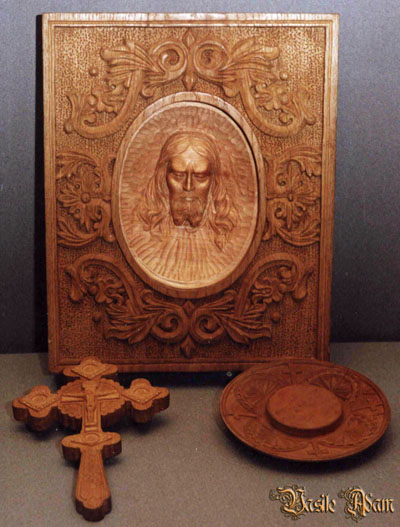
First creations

== See also ==
- Romanian People's Salvation Cross
