= Romanian People's Salvation Cross =

Monumental cross in Moldova

Coordinates: 47°04′11″N 28°12′04″E

- Crucea Mântuirii Neamului Românesc
- Interactive map of Romanian People's Salvation Cross
- Location: Zghihara Hill, Nisporeni
- Material: Steel
- Height: 35 m (115 ft)
- Beginning date: 2010
- Completion date: 2011
- Opening date: 28 August 2011

The Romanian People's Salvation Cross (Romanian: Crucea Mântuirii Neamului Românesc) is a monumental cross in Nisporeni, Moldova. The cross has a height of 35 metres (115 ft) and is the largest cross in Moldova.

== Constructuion ==
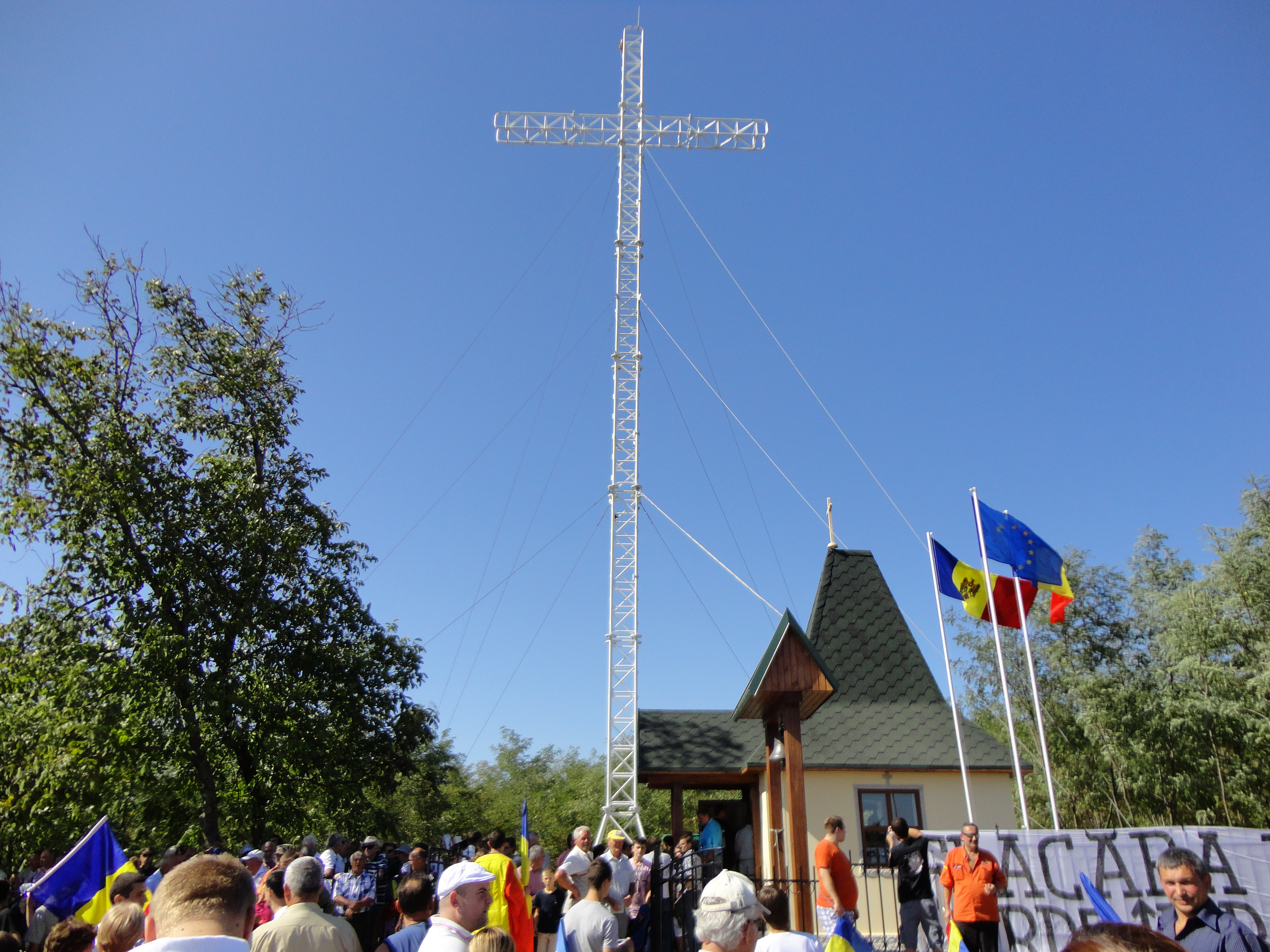
The Romanian People's Salvation Cross.

The monument was built in 2011 on Zghihara Hill (Dealul Zghihara) at an altitude of 316 m (1,037 ft); Zghihara Hill is one of the highest hills in Moldova. The monumental cross is illuminated by LEDs during night and is visible at tens of kilometers.

The monument was opened on August 28, 2011, by Petru, the Metropolitan of Bessarabia, Teofan Savu (Archbishop of Iaşi and Metropolitan of Moldova and Bucovina), and Corneliu Bârlădeanul Onila (Vicar Archprelate of the Bishopric of Huşi). More than 800 participants joined the opening ceremony on August 28, 2011, among them being Mihai Ghimpu, Marius Lazurcă, Dorin Chirtoacă, Ion Ungureanu, Valeriu Saharneanu, Veaceslav Ţâbuleac, Vasile Adam. The Monument is located near Vărzăreşti Monastery.

The Romanian People's Salvation Cross was built by public subscription which cost 1,300,000 lei. A book, containing over 200 pages and about 100 color photographs, recorded all those who contributed to the monument project.

== See also ==
- Monuments and memorials in Moldova
- Trinitas Cross
