= Vladimir Andronachi =

Moldovan politician and economist

Member of the Moldovan Parliament
- In office 23 February 2015 – 23 July 2021
- Preceded by: Pavel Filip
- Parliamentary group: Democratic Party

Personal details
- Born: 13 October 1980 (age 45) Nisporeni, Moldavian SSR, Soviet Union (now Moldova)
- Party: Democratic Party of Moldova (until 2020)
- Education: Academy of Economic Studies of Moldova
- Occupation: Politician, economist

Vladimir Andronachi (also Andronache; born 13 October 1980) is a Moldovan politician and economist. He was born in Nisporeni, in the Moldavian SSR of the Soviet Union (now Moldova), and studied at the Academy of Economic Studies of Moldova. Before entering politics, Andronachi was manager in companies that, according to Moldovan media, were connected to Moldovan politician and oligarch Vladimir Plahotniuc.

He became a member of the Parliament of Moldova as part of the Plahotniuc-led Democratic Party of Moldova (PDM; now the European Social Democratic Party, PSDE) in 2015 and won a new mandate in 2019, having also been vice president of the PDM. Andronachi left Moldova after the fall of Plahotniuc's regime in June 2019, after which the Moldovan authorities opened criminal cases against him and he was included on Interpol's international wanted list. He was expelled from the PDM on 14 August 2020 after having failed to attend parliamentary sessions for a long time, with him having announced to media an hour earlier that he had decided to leave the party of his own volition.

Andronachi was arrested in November 2022 after being detained in Ukraine and handed over to the Moldovan authorities, but he was released in August 2023 "under the personal guarantee" of four people, including a cleric. However, the investigation against him, which began in 2021, was resumed in August 2025. As of September of that year, Andronachi was on trial for two criminal cases. In one, he was accused of complicity in the 2014 Moldovan bank fraud scandal, also known as "the theft of the billion" (Romanian: furtul miliardului), more precisely of having caused losses of 23 million lei to the Moldovan state. The other referred to the fraudulent purchase of forms for passports, a scheme through which he would have harmed the state with 140,000 lei as Radio Europa Liberă Moldova stated.

Andronachi was also involved, according to an investigation by TV8 journalists, in a scheme implemented between 2014 and 2016 in which Moldova purchased electricity from the Cuciurgan power station, located in its unrecognized breakaway region of Transnistria, through the shell company Energokapital, which would have had links to Plahotniuc and Transnistria's then de facto president Yevgeny Shevchuk. Furthermore, Andronachi was involved in the so-called Metalferos case, in which he was accused of money laundering and of "creating and leading a criminal organization", causing damages of over 1.1 billion lei (over 55 million euros) according to the Office of the Prosecutor General of Moldova and leading to the seizure of the National Hotel in Chișinău, which he had owned up until that point. He would have also been involved in a deal to sell the Moldovan consulate in Odesa, in Ukraine, which never came to fruition due to intervention of the Moldovan authorities.
