= Trinitas Cross =

Cross-shaped antenna in Romania

Coordinates: 46°01′N 27°08′E

Trinitas Cross on Păun Hill
- Romania
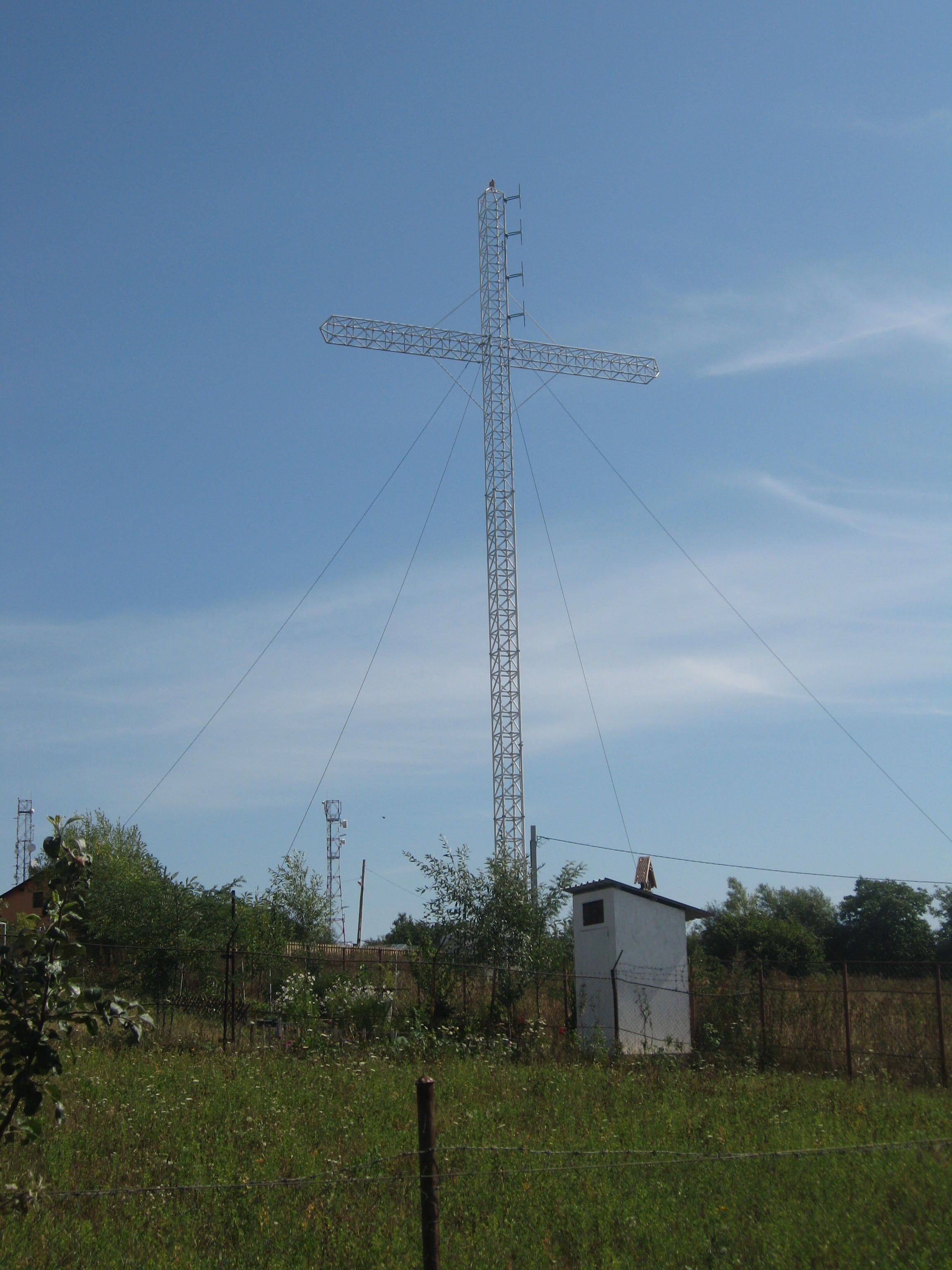
- Front view of the cross shaped antenna
- For radio transmission
- Unveiled: August 2006
- Location: near Bârnova, Iași County
- Designed by: Patriarch Daniel of Romania

The Trinitas Cross is a cross-shaped antenna with a height of 40 metres (131 ft) located on a hill near the Păun village in Bârnova, Iași County. It is taller than the Heroes' Cross on Caraiman Peak, which has a height of 28 metres (92 ft), and is considered the tallest cross in Romania. Due to its height and because it is lit at night, the cross is visible from almost any point of Iași and tens of kilometers away, even in places to the left of the Prut River in Moldova.

== History ==
At the initiative of Patriarch Daniel of Romania in July 2006, on the hill near the Păun village, the work began on the raising of a metal cross which would have at its top a broadcast antenna of Radio Trinitas (a radio station founded in 1998 by the then-Metropolitan Daniel). The monument was erected in accordance with regulations, and taking into consideration the fact that all aircraft landing at Iași International Airport pass over the hill. The cross has a metallic frame of 40 metres (131 ft), equivalent to a block of 10 floors and weighs about 6 tons and is illuminated at night by 100 lights. It was raised by a large-capacity crane specially brought from Bacău. At midnight on 21 to 22 August 2006, a synod of 30 priests led by the Patriarch Daniel of Romania consecrated the cross-shaped antenna that would allow some more remote localities of the Iași County to receive the Trinitas radio on a radius of 100 km.

In the years after the inauguration, two pilgrimages were organized to the Trinitas Cross on the Păun Hill, on September 14, 2006 and on July 29, 2007.

== See also ==
- Romanian People's Salvation Cross
