= Bârnova Monastery =

Heritage site in Bârnova, Iași, Romania

Coordinates: 47.074492°N 27.6275714°E

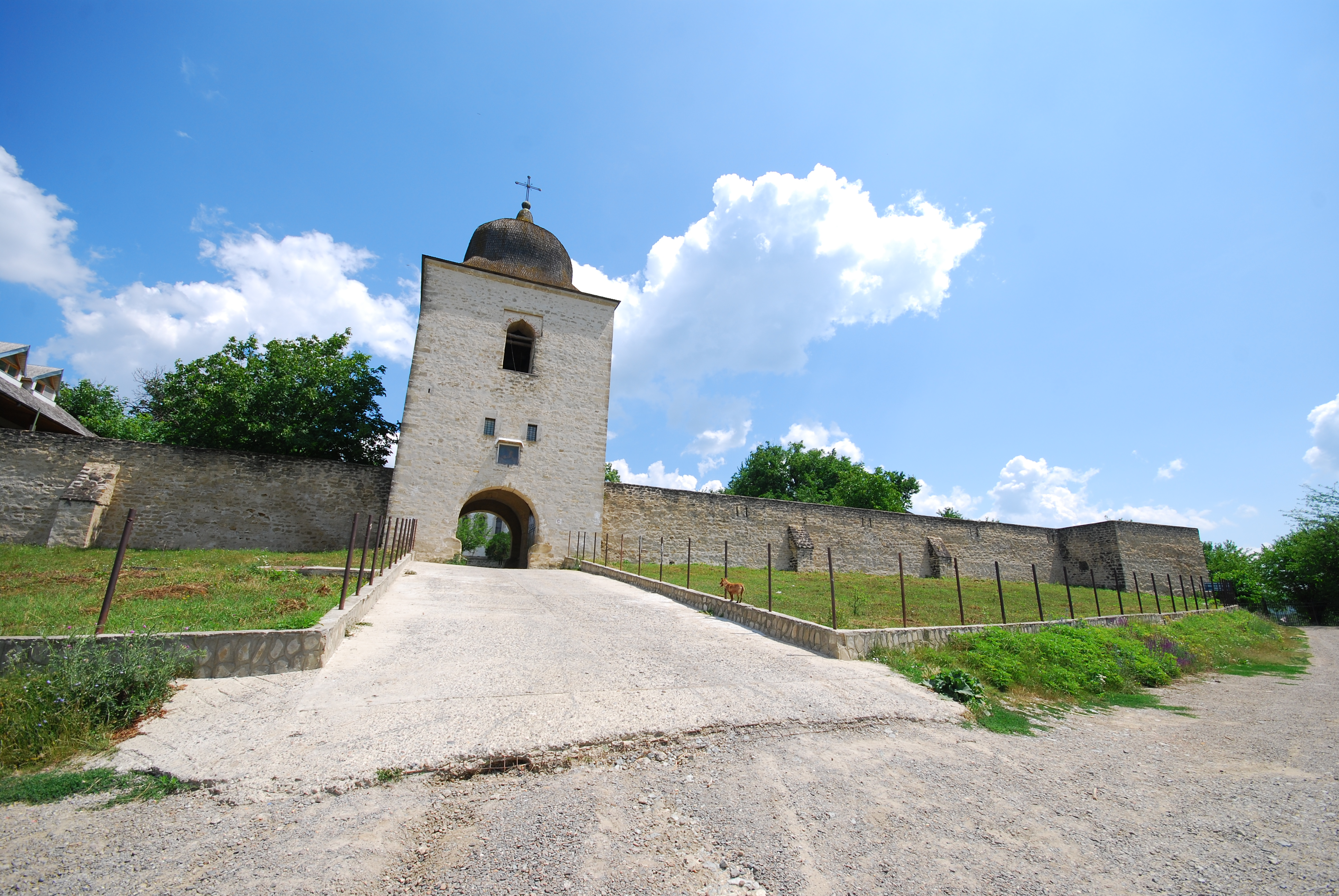

Religion
- Affiliation: Romanian Orthodox Church

Location
- Location: Bârnova, Romania
- Interactive map of Bârnova Monastery

Architecture
- Style: Moldavian, Byzantine
- Completed: 1628
- Materials: stone, brick

The Bârnova Monastery (Romanian: Mănăstirea Bârnova) is a Romanian Orthodox monastery located in Bârnova, Iași metropolitan area, Moldavia, Romania.

Built in 1628 by Moldavian Voivode Miron Barnovschi-Movilă, the monastery is listed in the National Register of Historic Monuments.

The oldest tree in Iași County is the 675-year-old hybrid lime tree (declared Natural Monument), located in the courtyard of Bârnova Monastery. When the lime was about 57 years old and had about 14 centimetres in diameter, Iași was mentioned as an urban settlement, during the reign of Prince Alexander the Good (1408).
