= Bârnova =

- Commune
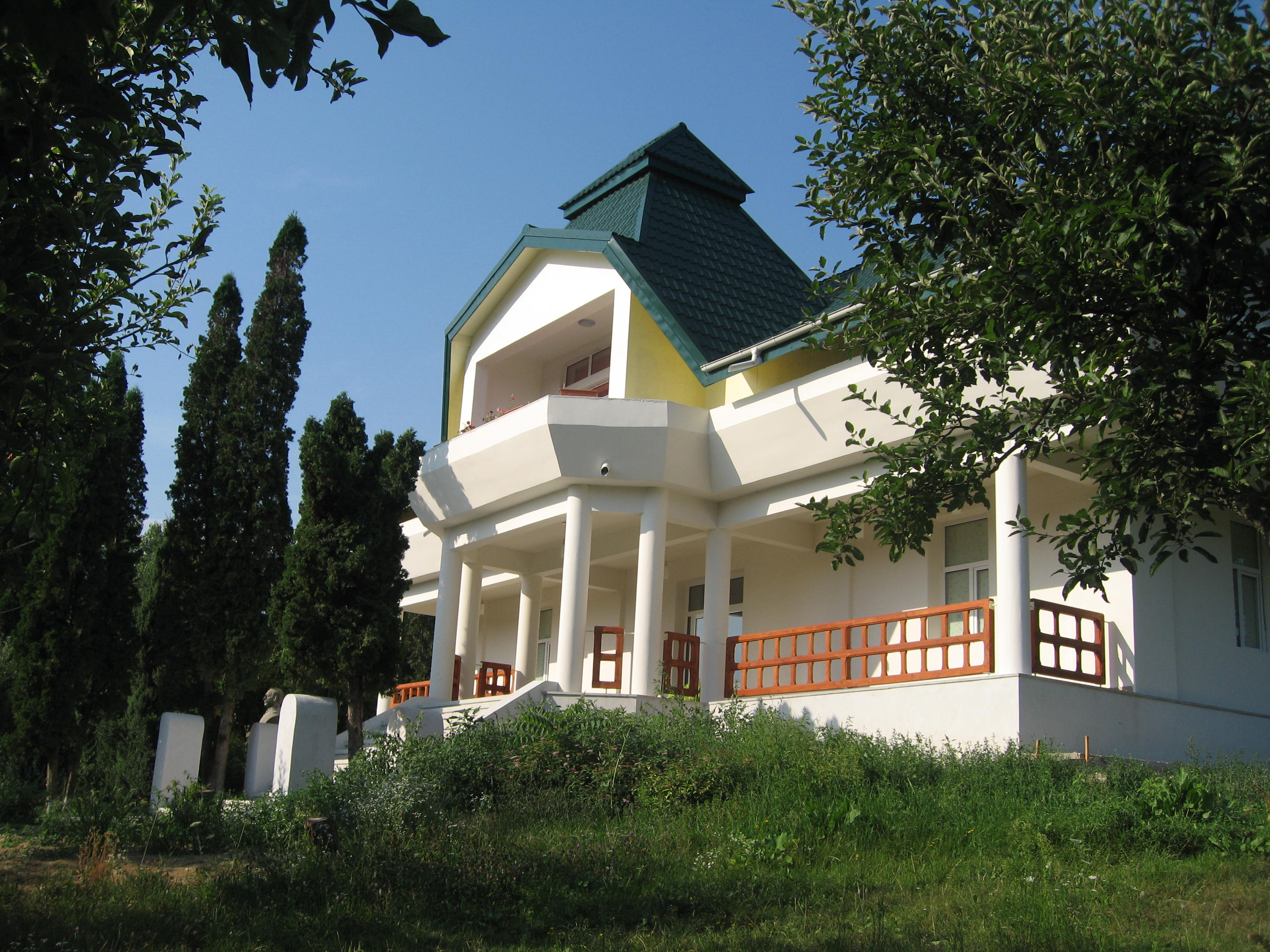
- Ion Inculeț mansion

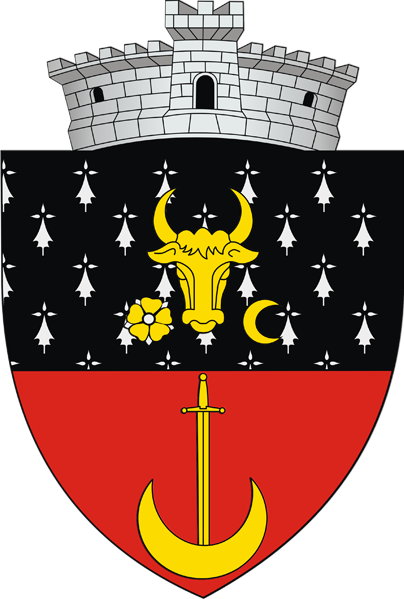
- Coat of arms

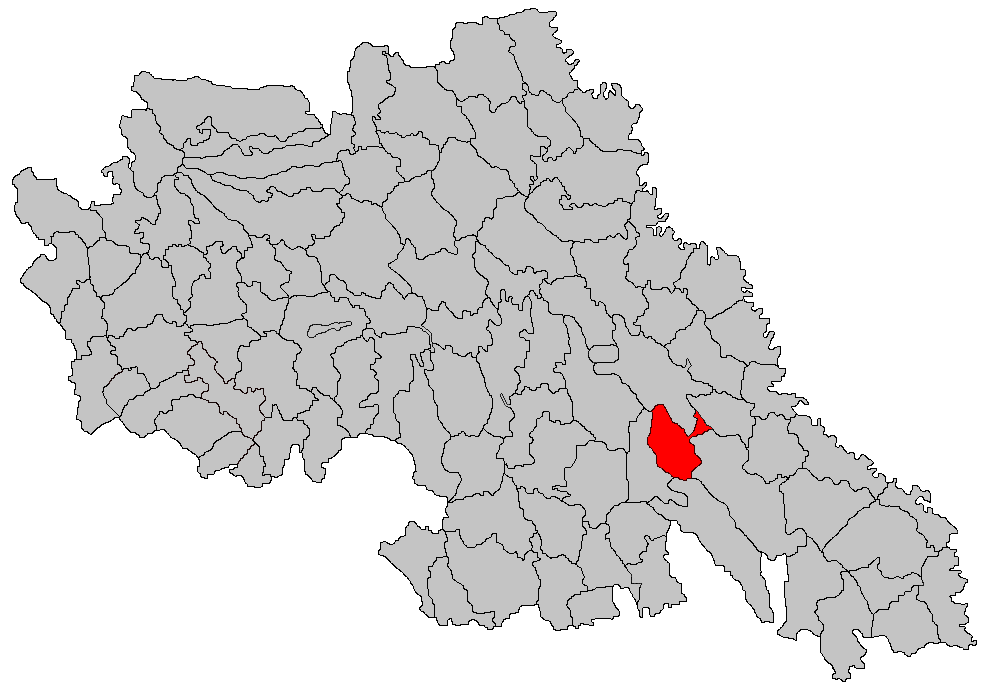
- Location in Iași County

- Location in Romania
- Coordinates: 47°09′N 27°35′E
- Country: Romania
- County: Iași

Government
  - Mayor (2020–2024): Mihai Balan (PNL)
- Area: 42.35 km^{2} (16.35 sq mi)
- Elevation: 130 m (430 ft)
- Population (2021-12-01): 7,913
  - Density: 186.8/km^{2} (483.9/sq mi)
- Time zone: UTC+02:00 (EET)
  - Summer (DST): UTC+03:00 (EEST)
- Postal code: 707035
- Area code: +(40) 232
- Vehicle reg.: IS
- Website: primariabarnova.ro

Bârnova is a commune in Iași County, Western Moldavia, Romania, part of the Iași Metropolitan Area. It is composed of six villages: Bârnova, Cercu, Păun, Pietrăria, Todirel, and Vișan.

The commune is located in the southern part of the county, 9 km (5.6 mi) from Iași, on the DN24 national road leading to Vaslui.

== See also ==
- Bârnova Monastery
- Trinitas Cross
