= Intourist =

Russian tour operator, headquartered in Moscow

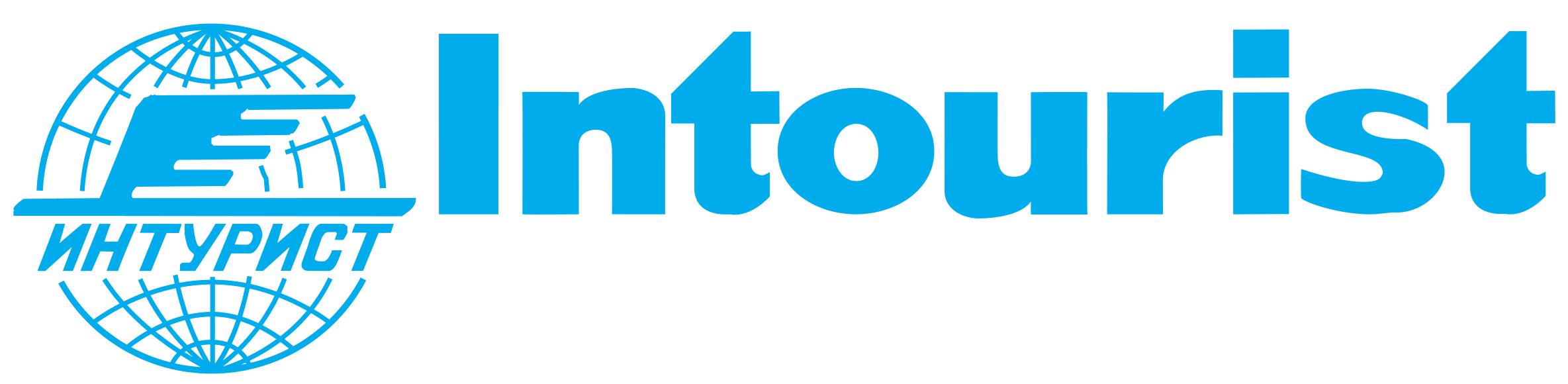

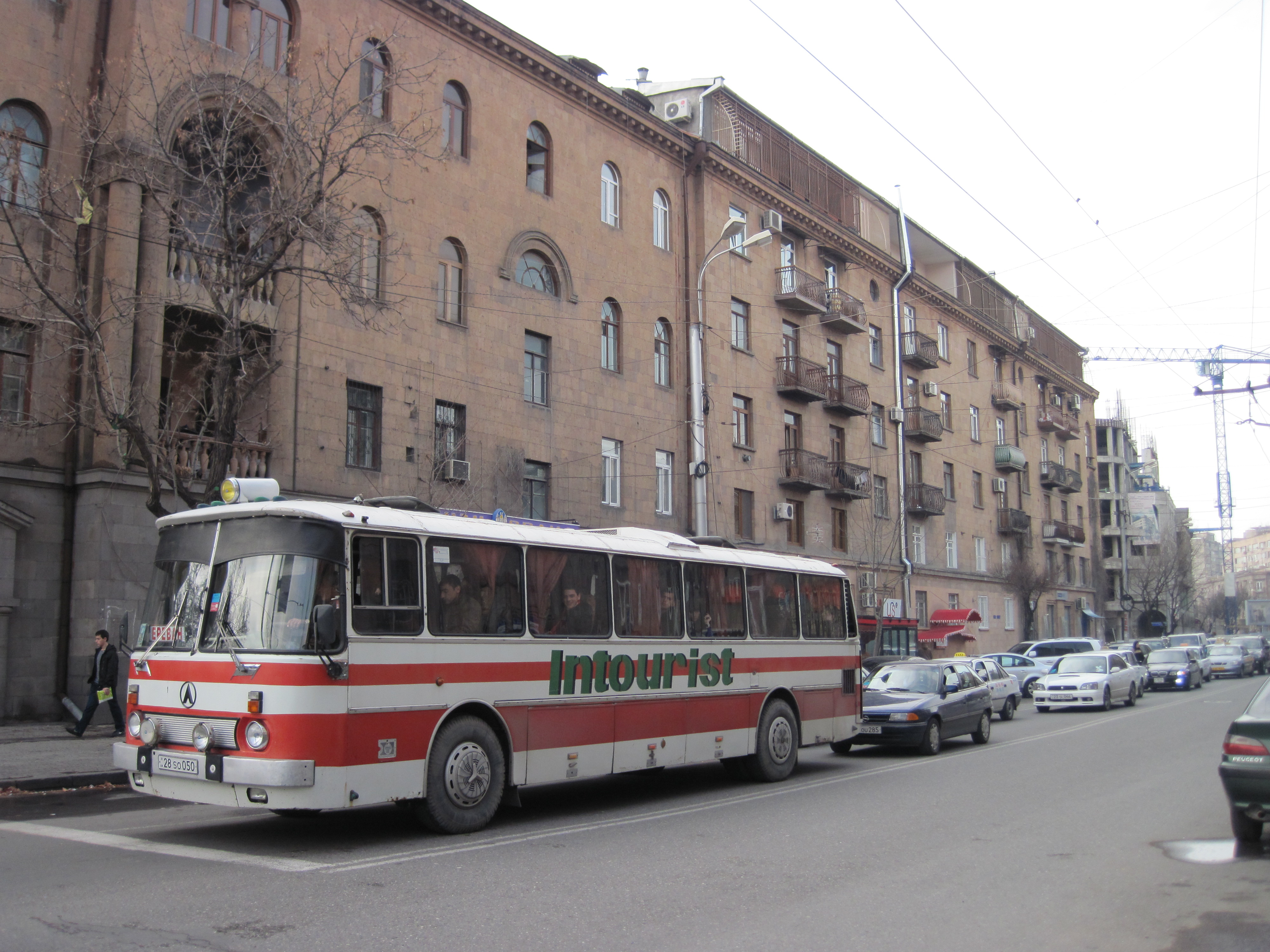
- Intourist bus LAZ-699 in Armenia, 2011
- Native name: Интурист
- Type: Open joint-stock company
- Industry: Tourism and hospitality
- Founded: 1929; 97 years ago
- Headquarters: Moscow, Russia
- Area served: Soviet Union, then Russia
- Key people: Aleksandr Arutyunov (President); Vyacheslav Kopyev (Chairman)
- Parent: Neşet Koçkar (50.1%); Sistema (49.9%)

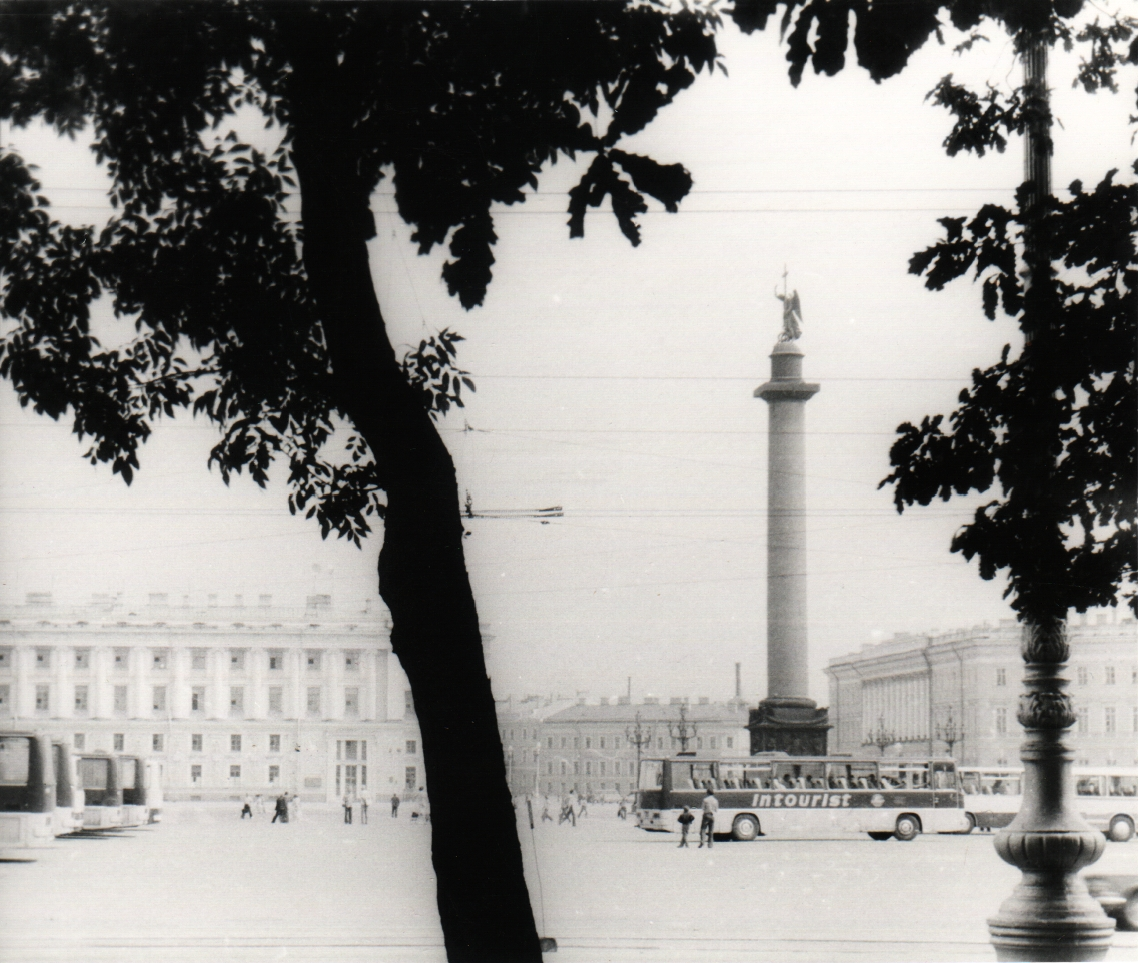
Intourist buses (Ikarus 250) at the Palace Square, Leningrad, 1980

Intourist (Russian: Интурист, a contraction of иностранный турист, "foreign tourist" also Goskomturist (Russian: Госкомтурист)) was a Soviet then Russian tour operator, headquartered in Moscow. It was founded on April 12, 1929, and served as the primary travel agency for foreign tourists in the Soviet Union. The former GRU military spy Viktor Suvorov stated that Intourist was run by the KGB. It was privatized in 1992 and, from 2011, was 50.1% owned by the British Thomas Cook Group until its collapse in September 2019. In November 2019, Anex Tours acquired the stake from the British Official Receiver.

== History ==
=== Stalin era ===
Intourist was founded on April 12, 1929, as the "All-Russian Joint-Stock Company for the Acceptance of Foreign Tourists" (Russian: Всероссийское акционерное общество по приему иностранных туристов ВАО «Интурист»). Intourist was responsible for managing the great majority of foreigners' access to, and travel within, the Soviet Union. In 1933, the president of Intourist, Wilhelm Kurz, a member of the Central Committee of the Soviet Union, was the first Soviet official to visit the United States after the US granted recognition to the Soviet Union.

In 1933 Aron Sheinman started work for Intourist in London and filled the post of Director from 1937 to 1939. When he was dismissed he refused to return to Moscow, and gained British citizenship later that year.

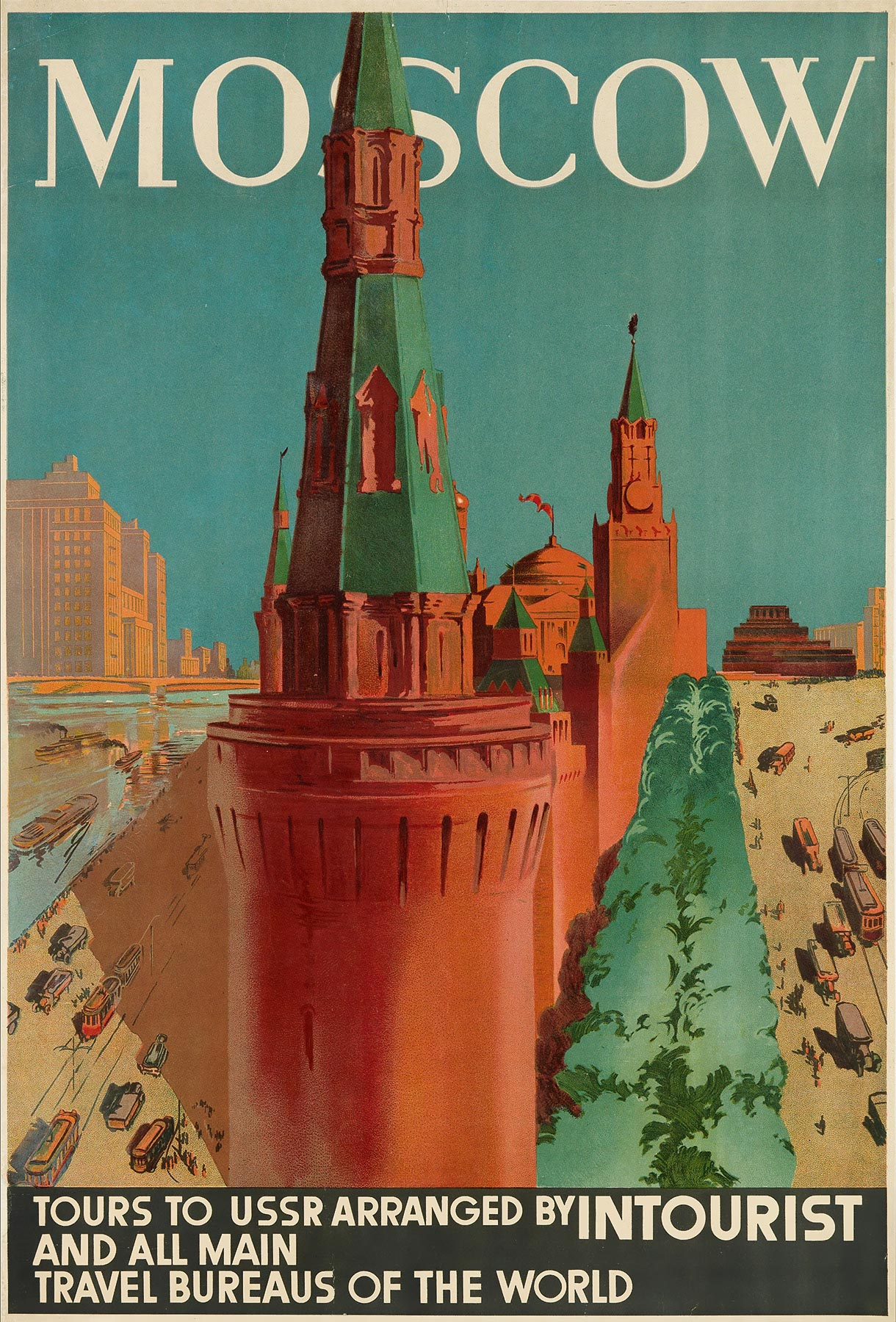
Poster advertising tourism to Moscow in the Soviet Union, Intourist, 1930

In the late Stalin era it was reported that "the number of foreigners visiting the Soviet Union dropped to nearly zero" as state officials actively discouraged travellers.

=== Post-Stalin era ===
The scholar Alex Hazanov writes in his dissertation on Intourist that "in the alternate universe that was the Soviet Union, the 'giant squid' of the Soviet state [would] engulf the traveler.. [There were] myriad ways in which the Soviet tourist monopoly, Intourist, both hindered the foreigner and shielded him from the vagaries of Soviet material life, and above all, the psychological costs of 'routine surveillance'... and the barriers the Soviets erected between foreigners and unvarnished (and uncomfortable) truths about the Soviet Union." Hazanov propounds that the Soviet state apparatchiks at Intourist had a "commitment to authoritarianism and social discipline as an instrument of geopolitical resistance." Indeed there were ties between Intourist and the KGB.

In 1953, after the death of Stalin, the decree banning Soviet citizens from marriage to a foreigner was abolished.

Intourist began selling packages to foreigners in 1955. It was "charged with obtaining hard currency to be used for imports of machinery that would help make the Soviet Union independent of global markets."

Intourist entered into tourism agreements with the China International Travel Service, a Chinese state-owned enterprise.

In 1956, the USSR received 56,000 tourists. In 1963, it received 168,000 tourists. By the early 1970s, it received 4,000,000 travelers yearly.

Visits were subject to "prior coordination" and excluded "specifically designated zones" such as a limited number of neighborhoods in a limited number of cities. This is a "principle that would define Soviet regulation of foreign travel for all categories of foreigners until 1991" and beyond.

Special note is taken in Hazanov's thesis of the 1957 Moscow Youth Festival, the 1959 Sokolniki Exhibition, and the 1980 Moscow Olympics, and he seems to accept the school of thought, "popularized by New York Times journalist Thomas Friedman’s paeans to globalization, ... that international exchange is the handmaiden of liberalization and erosion of authoritarian regimes", by which means ultimately Intourist can be seen as an unwitting cuckoo in the Soviet nest.

One of Intourist's flagship properties was the Intourist Hotel in Chișinău, later known after the fall of the Soviet Union as the National Hotel.

=== After privatisation ===
In 1990, Intourist (as the exclusive travel agency in the Soviet Union) held a dominant position in the market with 110 hotels and handled 2 million foreign tourists per year. By early 1992, "tourists could get a guided tour of the KGB headquarters for $35". The enterprise was privatised that year along with many other state-owned businesses during Boris Yeltsin's tenure. In 1992, Intourist became the first Russian company to acquire an American company when it acquired a 75% interest in Rahim Tours of Florida.

In 2011, British tour operator Thomas Cook Group plc acquired a 50.1% interest in Intourist for $45 million. The company sought to gain access to Russian travelers going abroad. Intourist had handled 600,000 passengers in 2009.

On November 15, 2019, Neşet Koçkar, chairman of Turkish tour operator Anex Tours, acquired Intourist from Thomas Cook's liquidators.

== Competition ==
Although the Soviet Union was not enamored of competition, Intourist did have competition in the form of Intourbureau and the Soviet Central Council of Tourism and Excursions. The New York Times described this competition as "tiptoed onto Intourist's turf." Quaker-founded Goodwill Holidays helped sell Intourbureau's competing offerings, which included use of hotels owned by the Soviet Central Council of Tourism and Excursions. They were the competition to Intourist's hotels that were staffed by employees described by an American tourist as being "as friendly as wardens at the state pen."

This competition to provide better service was to encourage visiting by non-Soviet unions, albeit not in a way that would save money. In 1991 a Los Angeles Times writer suggested another option: obtain information from recent immigrants.

=== Afterlife ===
Despite the name Intourist having a strong link to service "as friendly as wardens at the state pen", attempts have been made to be even better than the (prior) competitor, Intourbureau in the eyes of "a hesitant traveling public."

== Publications ==
- Visit Crimea Moscow: Intourist, 1930

== See also ==
- Tourism in Russia
- Torgsin
- Beryozka
