= National Hotel (Chișinău) =

Abandoned hotel in Chișinău, Moldova

Coordinates: 47°00′53″N 28°50′56″E

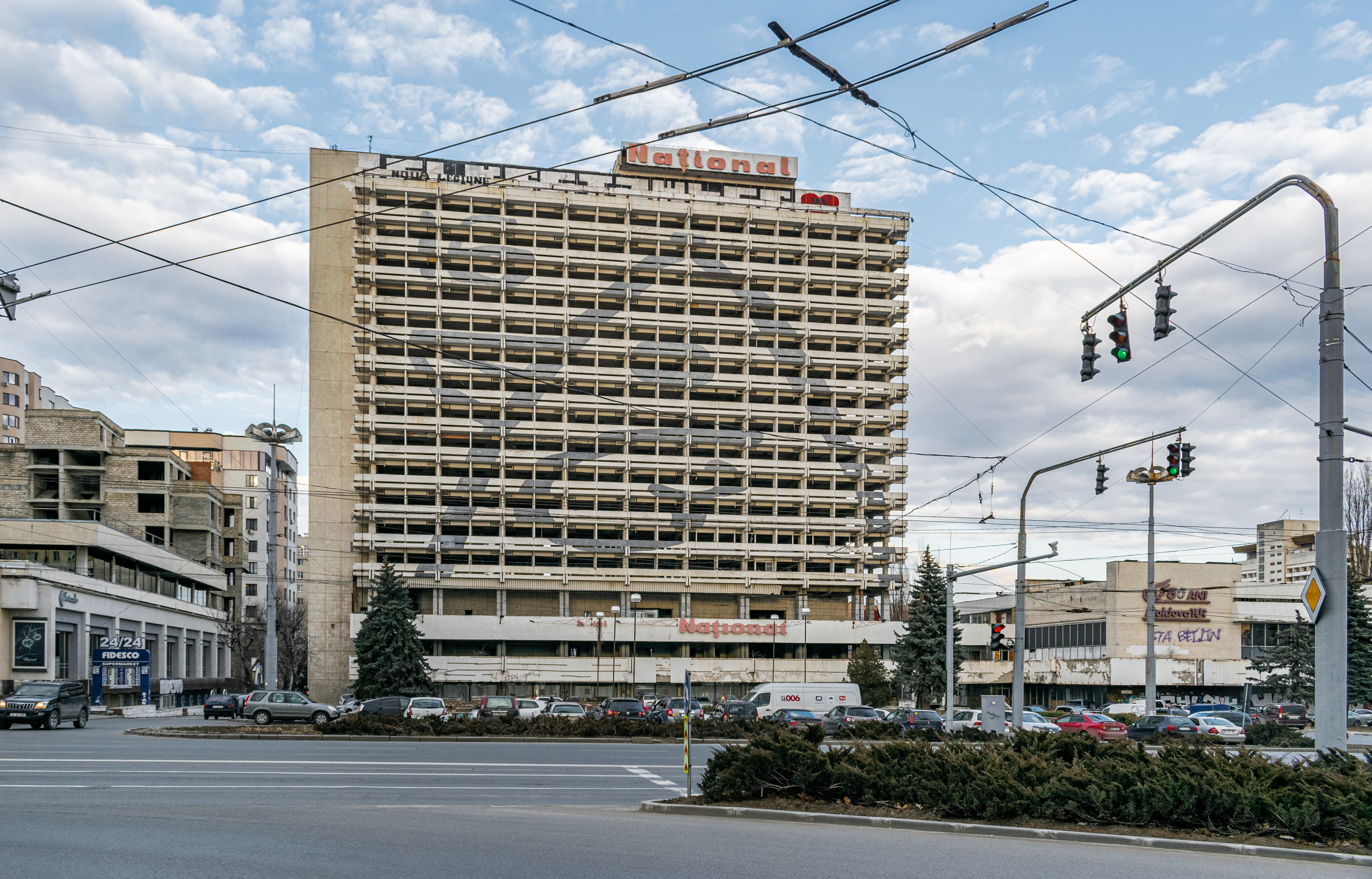
The National Hotel in 2020

The National Hotel (Romanian: Hotelul Național) is a closed four-star hotel in Chișinău, Moldova. It was formerly called the Intourist Hotel, after the Soviet state-owned travel monopoly that initially ran it.

== History ==
=== Soviet era ===
The Intourist Hotel was constructed in Chișinău, then the capital of the Moldavian Soviet Socialist Republic, and finished in 1974 or 1978. It was designed by the architects A. Gorbuntsov and V. Shalaginov. After its opening, the 17-story socialist modernist building "became a proud symbol of the Soviet Union's embrace of modernity", according to The New York Times. The four-star hotel was run by the Soviet state-owned travel monopoly of the same name, and it served as one of their flagship properties. It was primarily booked by foreign visitors and Soviet celebrities.

The hotel had three bars located on the 3rd, 14th, and 17th floors. The 14th floor bar was unusual as it could accept 14 currencies as payment, including non-Soviet; it was the only currency bar to be built in Chișinău. In addition to the hotel, the property included a connected building with a 160-seat restaurant and two halls, one with 200 seats and the other with 100 seats.

The Intourist under Soviet ownership
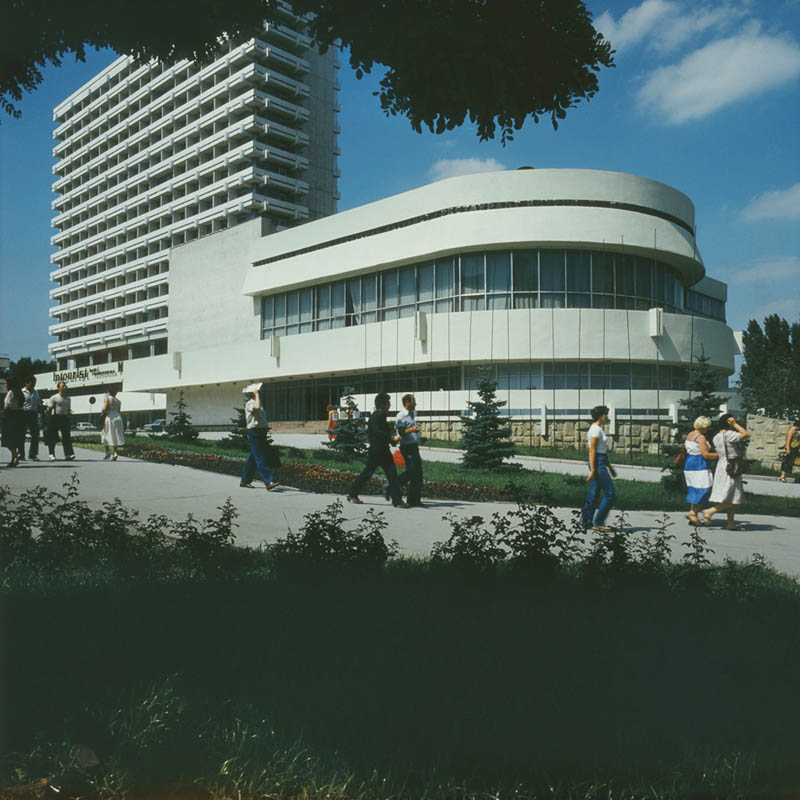
The hotel's annex and restaurant in 1983

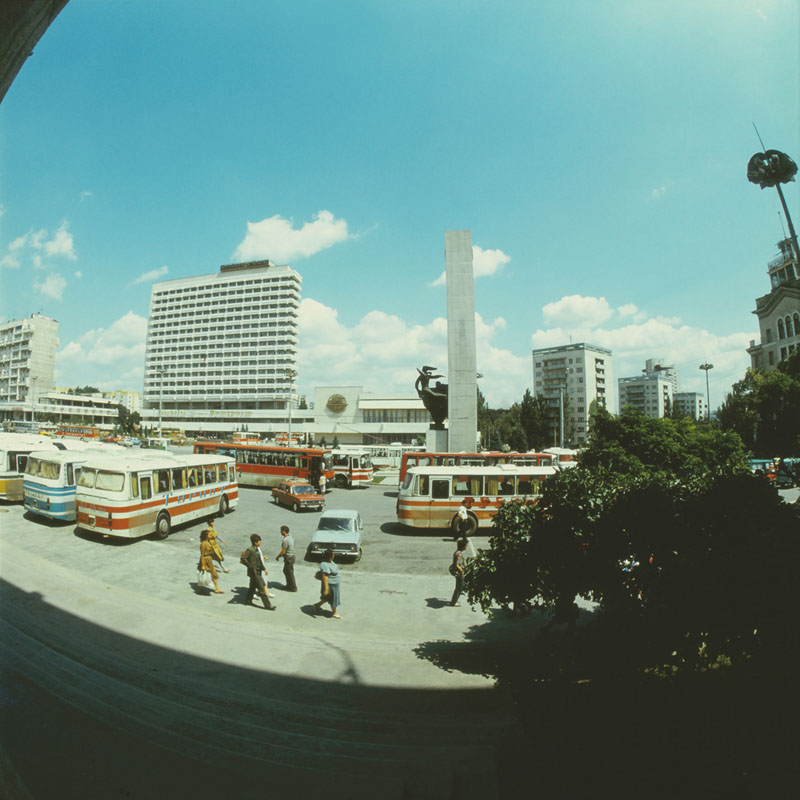
The hotel and surrounding area in 1980

=== Moldovan era ===
Intourist pulled out of Moldova after the dissolution of the Soviet Union, and the Intourist hotel was taken over by MoldovaTur, a former Soviet and newly Moldovan state-owned company in 1992. It was renamed the National Hotel at this time. Guest bookings dropped significantly after the 1992 Transnistria War. In 1999, MoldovaTur agreed to sell the hotel to the Israeli company Avi Awaks for US$1.55 million, but the deal fell through.

MoldovaTur was purchased by the private company Alfa Engineering in 2006. Although the company promised to invest in the National Hotel, the building was left to decay as its ownership continued to change multiple times and the Great Recession hit. By the mid-2010s, much of the building's interior was wrecked or had been carried off. A decorative fountain in front of the former hotel made news in 2018 when a city deputy mayor ordered that a large amount of trash in it be cleaned.

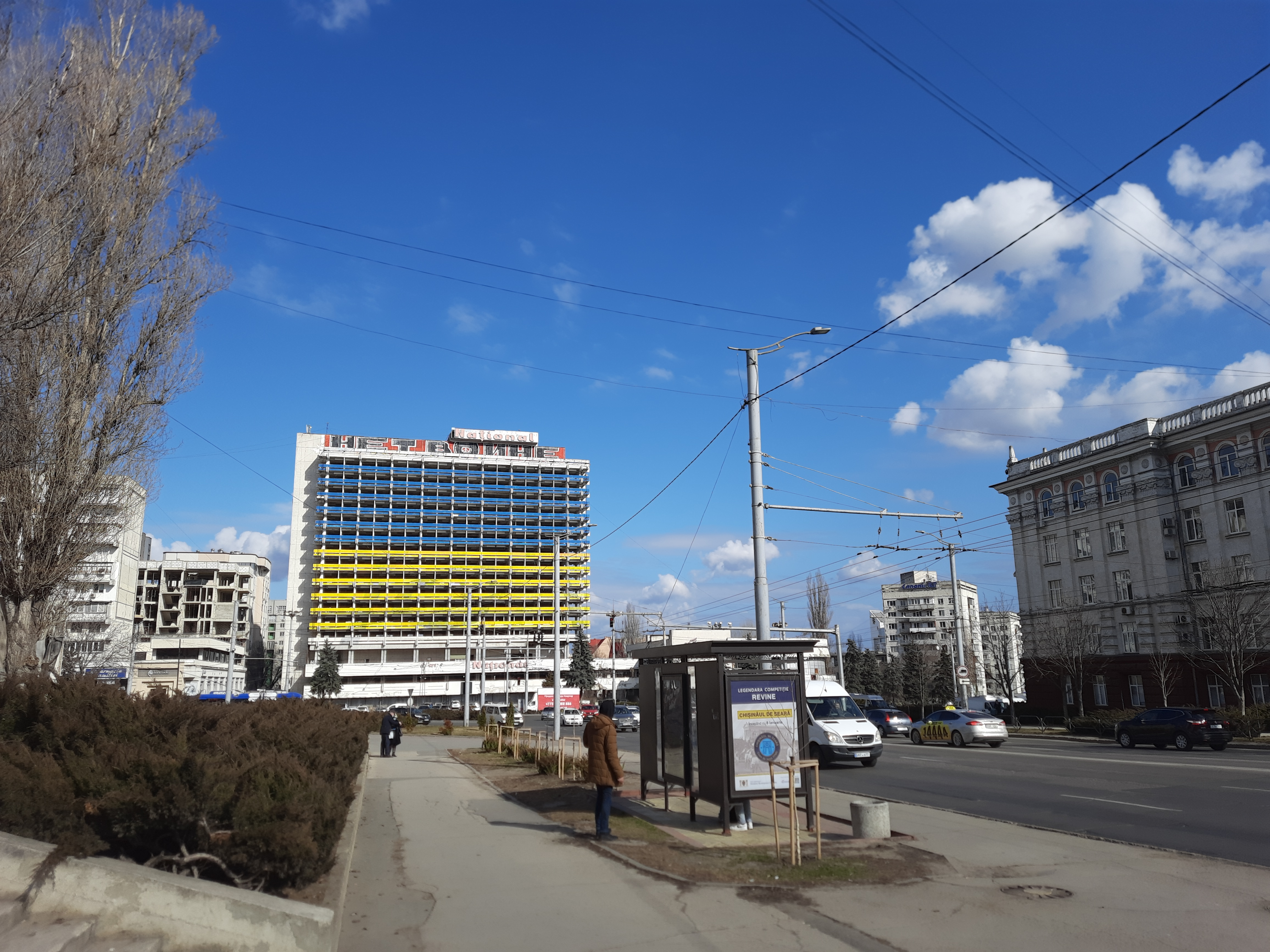
Graffiti artists painted a large Ukrainian flag on the former hotel in 2022 to protest the Russian invasion of Ukraine.

In 2021, the National Hotel's new owner Vladimir Andronachi asked the local government for permission to demolish the building and replace it with office space. This request was temporarily granted, but the decision was reversed amid government infighting and external public pressure. In 2022, the court overseeing a legal case against Andronachi for alleged money laundering ordered that the hotel be held as potential compensation should Andronachi lose. During the same year, graffiti artists painted a large Ukrainian flag on the building in protest of Russia's invasion of that country. Other artists subsequently overpainted parts of that flag with symbols related to Russia and its invasion, including orange and black lines and Russian military symbols. In June 2024, it was repainted with the Moldovan flag.

As of 2024, the demolition plans remained on hold as a result of the legal case and preservationists advocating to preserve the building due to its history and architecture. Although the building's entrances were boarded up, the interior was still relatively easily accessible. As a result, the former lobby was marred with human excrement and broken bottles, and many of the hotel's fixtures, wiring, windows, and decorative marble tiles had been stripped. Squatters and other homeless individuals used it as a refuge in between occasional police sweeps. Commenting on the National Hotel's fall from a flagship property to effectively abandoned, The New York Times wrote in 2024 that the building was "a study in the post-Soviet dysfunctions of one of Europe's poorest countries".

In late 2025, a 13-year-old girl was found dead in the abandoned National Hotel. The city government responded by adding fences and cameras around the building.

== See also ==
- Hotel Intourist, Moscow
