= Daniel Adam =

Moldovan footballer

Personal information
- Date of birth: 30 November 1998 (age 27)
- Place of birth: Chișinău, Moldova
- Height: 1.77 m (5 ft 10 in)
- Position: Midfielder

Team information
- Current team: Amersfoortse Boys (futsal)

Youth career
- Zimbru Chișinău

Senior career*
Years	Team	Apps	(Gls)
2015–2017	Zimbru-2 Chișinău	24	(3)
2016–2018	Zimbru Chișinău	64	(2)
2019	Codru Lozova	18	(0)
2020–2022	Spartanii Selemet	3	(0)
2023–2025	IJsselmeervogels (futsal)		
2025–	Amersfoortse Boys (futsal)		
- * Club domestic league appearances and goals

Daniel Adam (born 30 November 1998) is a Moldovan footballer who plays futsal for Dutch side Amersfoortse Boys.

He played football, most recently as a midfielder for Moldovan club Spartanii Selemet. He turned to futsal and played in the UEFA Futsal Champions League with Nistru Chișinău and for the Moldova national futsal team. He moved to the Netherlands and joined the IJsselmeervogels futsal team.
