= Valea-Trestieni =

- Commune
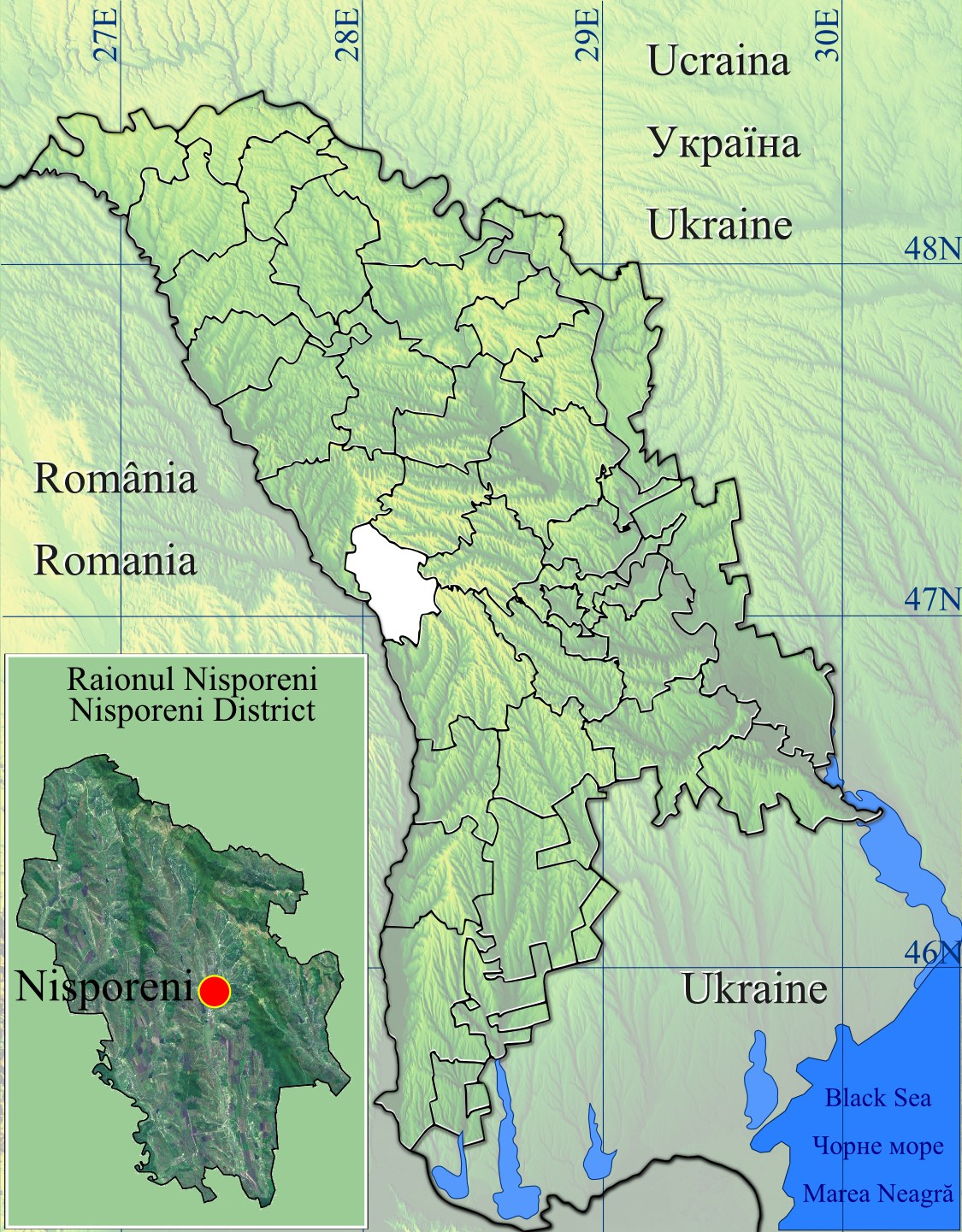
- Location within Nisporeni
- Coordinates: 47°4′17″N 28°4′11″E
- Country: Moldova
- District: Nisporeni District

Government
  - Mayor: Guidea Marin

Population (2014)
  - Total: 1,839
- Time zone: UTC+2 (EET)
  - Summer (DST): UTC+3 (EEST)
- Postal code: MD-6438

Valea-Trestieni is a commune in Nisporeni District, Moldova. It is composed of five villages: Isăicani, Luminița, Odobești, Selișteni and Valea-Trestieni.
