= 2021–22 Moldovan "A" Division =

Moldovan football's second-tier league

Divizia A
- Season: 2021–22
- Dates: 30 July 2021 – 13 May 2022
- Champions: Sheriff-2
- Promoted: Dacia Buiucani
- Relegated: Iskra
- Matches: 132
- Goals: 424 (3.21 per match)
- Top goalscorer: Nicolae Porojniuc (12 goals)
- Best goalkeeper: Nicolae Garanovschi (8 clean sheets)
- Biggest home win: Spartanii 6–0 Real Succes (22 April 2022)
- Biggest away win: Sucleia 1–7 Dacia Buiucani (2 April 2022)
- Highest scoring: Sucleia 1–7 Dacia Buiucani (2 April 2022)
- Longest winning run: 9 matches Victoria
- Longest unbeaten run: 12 matches Dacia Buiucani
- Longest winless run: 22 matches Cahul-2005
- Longest losing run: 18 matches Cahul-2005

The 2021–22 Moldovan "A" Division (Romanian: Divizia A) was the 31st season of Moldovan football's second-tier league. The season started on 30 July 2021 and ended on 13 May 2022.

== Teams ==
Location of teams in 2021–22 Divizia A

Club	Location
Cahul-2005	Cahul
Dacia Buiucani	Chișinău
Iskra	Rîbnița
Olimp	Comrat
Real Succes	Chișinău
Sheriff-2	Tiraspol
Spartanii	Selemet
Speranța	Drochia
Sporting	Valea-Trestieni
Sucleia	Sucleia
FCM Ungheni	Ungheni
Victoria	Chișinău

== Season summary ==
=== League table ===
Pos	Team	Pld	W	D	L	GF	GA	GD	Pts	Promotion or relegation
1	Sheriff-2 Tiraspol (C)	22	15	4	3	49	15	+34	49 (Note: Sheriff-2 ahead of Victoria on goal difference: Sheriff-2 : +34, Victoria : +27.)	Ineligible for promotion
2	Victoria Chișinău (Note: Victoria Chișinău were refused the necessary licence to compete in the 2022–23 Super Liga season.)	22	15	4	3	51	24	+27	49	
3	Dacia Buiucani (P)	22	14	6	2	58	15	+43	48	Promotion to Super Liga
4	Spartanii Selemet	22	13	5	4	46	26	+20	44	Qualification to Promotion play-off
5	Sporting Trestieni	22	12	0	10	31	31	0	36	
6	Olimp Comrat	22	10	5	7	41	36	+5	35	
7	Sucleia	22	8	3	11	34	40	−6	27	
8	Iskra Rîbnița (R)	22	7	4	11	28	44	−16	25	Relegation to Liga 2 (Note: Iskra Rîbnița have been relegated voluntarily.)
9	FCM Ungheni	22	6	6	10	38	42	−4	24	
10	Real Succes	22	5	3	14	22	45	−23	18	
11	Speranța Drochia (Note: Speranța Drochia spared relegation due to lack of teams.)	22	4	4	14	20	48	−28	16	
12	Cahul-2005	22	0	2	20	6	58	−52	2	withdrew (Note: Cahul-2005 withdrew from the league after round 11. All remaining fixtures are awarded 0–3 against them.)

Source: FMF, Soccerway
Rules for classification: 1) Points; 2) Head-to-head points; 3) Head-to-head goal difference; 4) Head-to-head away goals scored; 5) Head-to-head goals scored; 6) Matches won; 7) Goal difference; 8) Goals scored; 9) Less red cards; 10) Less yellow cards.
(C) Champions; (P) Promoted; (R) Relegated

=== Results ===
Teams will play each other twice (once home, once away).

Home \ Away	CAH	DAC	ISK	OLI	REA	SHE	SPA	SPE	SPO	SUC	UNG	VIC
Cahul-2005	—	0–3 (Note: Technical wins/losses)	0–3	0–3	0–3	0–3	0–2	0–1	0–2	0–3	0–3	0–1
Dacia Buiucani	2–0	—	3–1	3–0	1–0	0–0	5–0	6–1	3–2	5–1	2–2	1–2
Iskra Rîbnița	3–1	0–5	—	1–1	1–1	0–3	0–3	3–3	2–0	2–3	3–1	1–1
Olimp Comrat	2–2	0–3	1–2	—	4–2	1–2	1–3	2–0	2–0	3–2	4–1	1–2
Real Succes	4–0	0–2	1–3	1–1	—	0–3	0–3	3–2	0–2	0–0	1–3	1–0
Sheriff-2 Tiraspol	3–0	1–1	3–1	3–3	2–0	—	4–1	4–0	0–1	2–1	4–0	2–1
Spartanii Selemet	3–0	1–1	1–0	2–2	6–0	1–0	—	0–0	5–1	1–1	1–0	2–2
Speranța Drochia	3–0	0–0	0–1	0–1	2–1	2–5	1–4	—	0–2	2–4	2–1	0–2
Sporting Trestieni	3–0	1–0	2–0	1–2	0–2	0–3	2–4	3–0	—	2–1	2–1	0–4
Sucleia	2–0	1–7	1–0	1–2	3–0	0–1	0–1	3–0	1–0	—	1–3	2–5
FCM Ungheni	3–3	0–3	5–0	2–3	3–2	0–0	4–1	0–0	1–3	2–2	—	2–2
Victoria Chișinău	3–0	2–2	5–1	3–2	4–0	2–1	2–1	3–1	0–2	2–1	3–1	—

Source: FMF (in Romanian)
Legend: Blue = home team win; Yellow = draw; Red = away team win.

== Results by round ==
The following table represents the teams game results in each round.

Team	1	2	3	4	5	6	7	8	9	10	11	12	13	14	15	16	17	18	19	20	21	22
Cahul-2005	L	L	D	D	L	L	L	L	L	L	L	L (Note: Technical loss)	L	L	L	L	L	L	L	L	L	L
Dacia Buiucani	W	L	W	D	W	D	W	D	D	W	W	W (Note: Technical win)	W	W	L	W	W	W	W	D	D	W
Iskra Rîbnița	W	D	L	L	W	W	L	L	D	L	L	D	W	L	L	D	W	W	W	L	L	L
Olimp Comrat	D	W	D	W	L	L	W	D	W	W	L	L	W	W	W	D	L	W	L	D	W	L
Real Succes	L	L	D	L	L	W	L	L	L	W	W	D	W	L	L	L	L	L	L	D	W	L
Sheriff-2 Tiraspol	W	W	W	W	D	L	D	W	L	W	L	D	W	W	W	W	W	W	W	W	D	W
Spartanii Selemet	D	W	W	W	D	W	W	W	D	L	W	W	W	W	W	L	D	L	W	W	D	L
Speranța Drochia	L	D	L	L	L	L	W	D	D	L	W	L	L	L	L	L	W	D	L	L	L	W
Sporting Trestieni	W	W	L	L	W	W	W	W	W	W	L	W	L	L	L	W	W	L	L	L	L	W
Sucleia	L	D	W	L	L	L	W	L	W	L	D	W	L	L	W	L	D	L	W	W	W	L
FCM Ungheni	W	L	L	D	W	L	L	W	D	D	L	D	L	D	W	W	L	D	L	L	L	W
Victoria Chișinău	L	W	W	D	D	W	W	L	D	D	W	W	L	W	W	W	W	W	W	W	W	W

== Top goalscorers ==
Rank	Player	Club	Goals
1	(Moldova) Nicolae Porojniuc	FCM Ungheni	12
2	(Moldova) Ghenadie Orbu	Victoria	10
2	(Moldova) Marin Stan	Victoria	10
4	(Moldova) Sorin Chele	Real Succes	8
4	(Moldova) Oleg Molla	Victoria	8
4	(Moldova) Eugeniu Gliga	Sheriff-2	8
7	(Moldova) Vasile Bîtlan	Dacia Buiucani	7
7	(Moldova) Constantin Iavorschi	Sporting	7
7	(Moldova) Ion Mamaliga	Spartanii	7
7	(Moldova) Nicu Namolovan	Dacia Buiucani	7
7	(Moldova) Octavian Onofrei	Spartanii	7
7	(Nigeria) Abdullahi Shuaibu	Sucleia	7

== Clean sheets ==
Rank	Player	Club	Clean sheets
1	(Moldova) Nicolae Garanovschi	Spartanii	8
2	(Moldova) Victor Colibă-Verde	Sporting	7
3	(Moldova) Dumitru Coval	Dacia Buiucani (4) & Real Succes (2)	6
3	(Moldova) Victor Dodon	Dacia Buiucani	6
5	(Moldova) Ivan Marcov	Sucleia	5
5	(Moldova) Serghei Savocica	Sheriff-2	5
7	(Moldova) Sergiu Nicolaev	Speranța	4
8	(Moldova) Mihail Cioban	Sheriff-2	3
8	(Moldova) Victor Secrieru	FCM Ungheni	3
10	(Moldova) Dmitri Burac	Victoria	2
10	(Moldova) Roman Dumenco	Sheriff-2	2
10	(Moldova) Andrei Vicol	Victoria	2
10	(Moldova) Dmitri Cîlcic	Olimp	2
10	(Moldova) Anatolie Cebotari	Iskra	2
