= Martin Kuittinen =

Finnish footballer (born 1997)

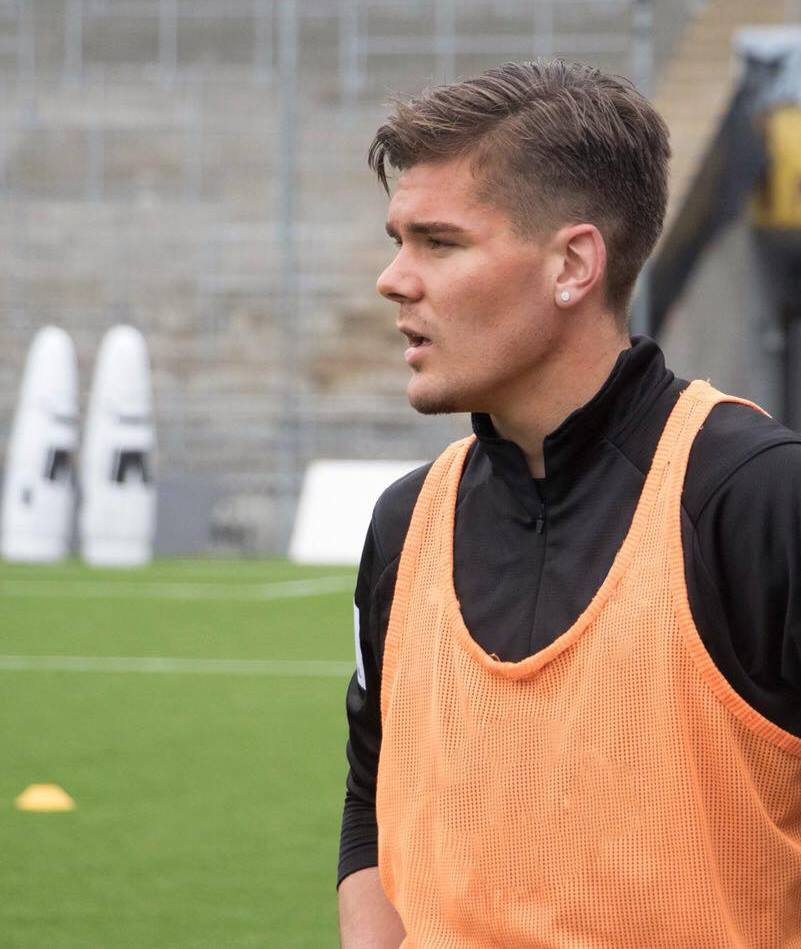
- Kuittinen warming-up in 2018

Personal information
- Full name: Martin Cristian Kuittinen Zbijewski
- Date of birth: 24 November 1997 (age 28)
- Place of birth: Hanko, Finland
- Height: 1.85 m (6 ft 1 in)
- Positions: Defender; winger

Team information
- Current team: Lokomotiv GO

Youth career
- 2014–2017: Real Valladolid

Senior career*
Years	Team	Apps	(Gls)
2013	BK-46	2	(0)
2017	Sintrense	0	(0)
2017–2018	Águias do Moradal	21	(2)
2019	Víkingur	17	(2)
2021–2024	Zimbru Chișinău	4	(0)
2023	→ Vard Haugesund (loan)	13	(2)
2024–	Lokomotiv GO	14	(0)
- * Club domestic league appearances and goals as of 21 November 2024

Martin Cristian Kuittinen Zbijewski (born 24 November 1997) is a Finnish professional footballer who plays as a full-back, wing-back or winger for Lokomotiv GO in Bulgarian Second League.

== Early life ==
Kuittinen was born in Hanko, Finland, to a Polish mother and a Finnish father, and he holds a dual citizenship of Finland and Poland.

== Career ==
At the age of 15, Kuittinen debuted for Finnish side BK-46. In 2014, he joined the youth academy of Real Valladolid in the Spanish second tier after trialing for the youth academy of Spanish top flight club Real Madrid. Before the second half of 2016–17, he signed for Sintrense in the Portuguese third tier after trialing for German Bundesliga team Werder Bremen.

Before the 2019 season, Kuittinen signed for Víkingur Ólafsvík in the Icelandic second tier. In 2021, he signed for Moldovan top flight outfit Zimbru after trialing for Jagiellonia Białystok in Poland, where he made 4 league appearances. On 22 October 2021, Kuittinen debuted for Zimbru during a 1–2 loss to Dinamo-Auto. In April 2023, he joined Norwegian third-tier side Vard Haugesund on loan.

== Career statistics ==
As of 21 November 2024.

Appearances and goals by club, season and competition
Club	Season	League			Cup (Note: Includes Taça de Portugal and Norwegian Cup)		Europe		Total	
Club	Season	Division	Apps	Goals	Apps	Goals	Apps	Goals	Apps	Goals
BK-46	2013	Kakkonen	2	0	–		–		2	0
Águias do Moradal	2017–18	Campeonato de Portugal	21	2	1	1	–		22	3
Víkingur	2019	1. deild karla	17	2	–		–		17	2
Zimbru Chișinău	2021–22	Moldovan Super Liga	4	0	0	0	–		4	0
Zimbru Chișinău	2022–23	Moldovan Super Liga	0	0	0	0	–		0	0
Zimbru Chișinău	2023–24	Moldovan Super Liga	0	0	0	0	0	0	0	0
Zimbru Chișinău	Total		4	0	0	0	0	0	4	0
Vard Haugesund (loan)	2023	2. divisjon	13	2	3	1	–		16	3
Lokomotiv GO	2024–25	Bulgarian Second League	14	0	0	0	–		14	0
Career total			71	6	4	2	0	0	75	8
