= Natalievca =

Natalievca Pravila de Sus
- Commune
- Location within Moldova
- Coordinates: 47°41′52″N 27°53′25″E
- Country: Moldova
- District: Fălești District

Government
  - Mayor: Olga Morgun (PCRM)
- Elevation: 184 m (604 ft)

Population (2014)
  - Total: 1,981
- Time zone: UTC+2 (EET)
  - Summer (DST): UTC+3 (EEST)
- Postal code: MD-5936

Natalievca is a commune in Făleşti District, Moldova. It is composed of five villages: Beleuți, Comarovca, Ivanovca, Natalievca, Popovca and Țapoc.
