= Ivan Lacusta =

Moldovan footballer

Personal information
- Full name: Ivan Lacusta
- Date of birth: 24 January 1995 (age 31)
- Place of birth: Moldova Romania
- Height: 1.87 m (6 ft 1 1/2 in)
- Position: Striker

Team information
- Current team: Bredaryd Lanna IK
- Number: 24

Senior career*
| Years | Team | Apps | (Gls) |
| 2011–2013 | Zaria-2 Bălți | 29 | (15) |
| 2013–2016 | Zaria Bălți | 85 | (14) |
| 2016–2017 | Ungheni | 11 | (1) |
| 2017 | Sfântul Gheorghe | 5 | (1) |
| 2017 | Spicul Chișcăreni | 2 | (0) |
| 2018 | Zaria Bălți | 2 | (1) |
| 2018 | Stal Brzeg | 4 | (1) |
| 2019 | Anderstorps IF | 25 | (16) |
| 2020 | Codru Lozova | 19 | (2) |
| 2021 | Fălești | 11 | (9) |
| 2021– | Speranța Drochia | 10 | (6) |

International career
| 2013–2014 | Moldova U19 | 10 | (1) |
| 2015 | Moldova U21 | 5 | (1) |
- * Club domestic league appearances and goals

Ivan Lacusta (born 24 January 1995) is a Moldovan-Romanian football player who currently is playing for Bredaryd Lanna IK.

== Career ==
=== Club career ===
In August 2018, Lacusta joined Polish III liga club Stal Brzeg. However, he was forced to leave the team due to the lacking of some documents, which meant that he was forced to leave the team by the end of the year. In 2019, Lacusta moved to Swedish club Anderstorps IF. He played 20 games in the Swedish 3rd Division and scores nine goals.

On 1 March 2020, Lacusta returned to Moldova and joined FC Codru Lozova. One year later, in March 2021, Lacusta moved to FC Fălești. In the summer 2021, he began playing for fellow league club FC Speranța Drochia.
