= Nisporeni =

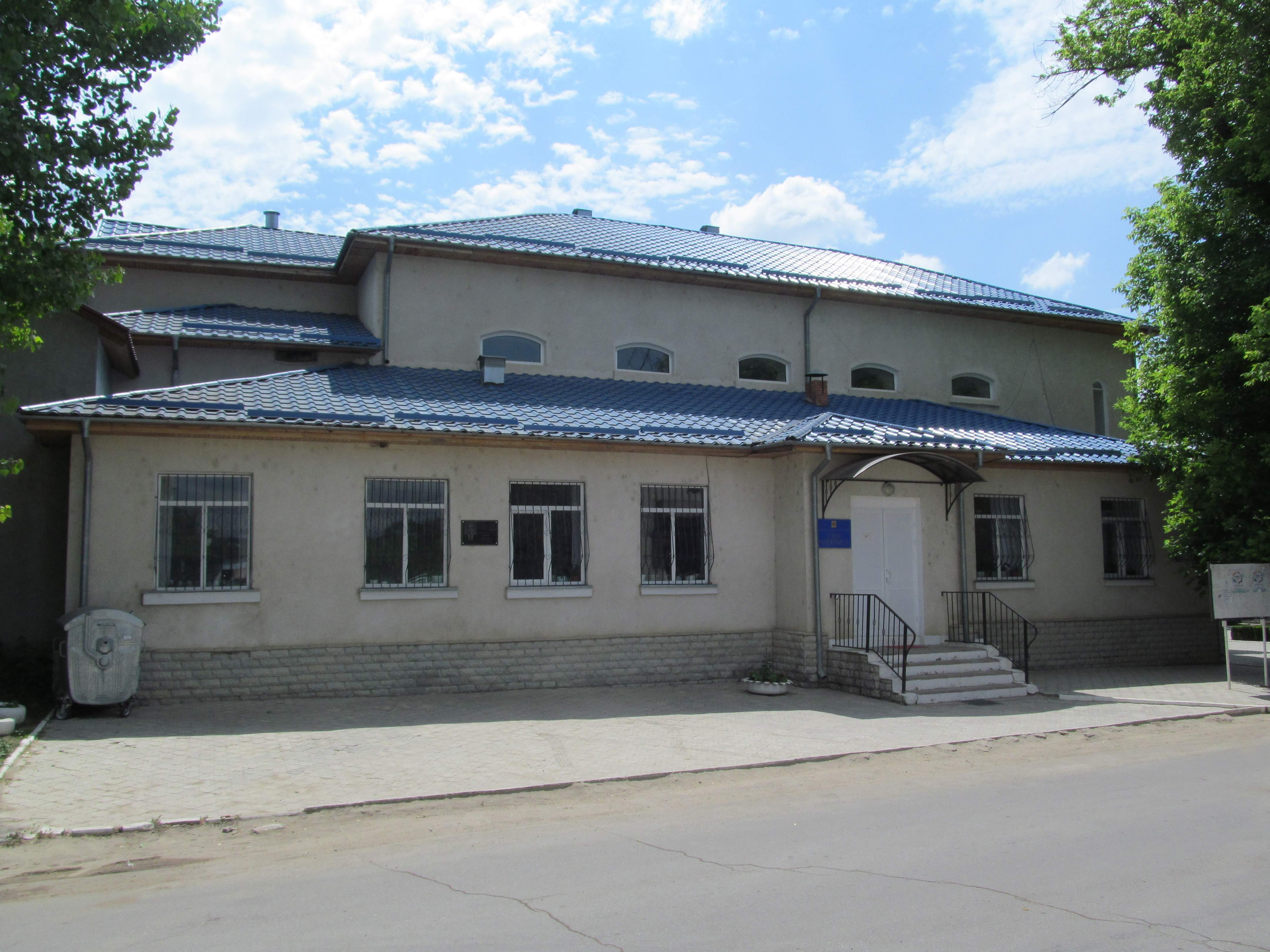

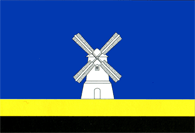
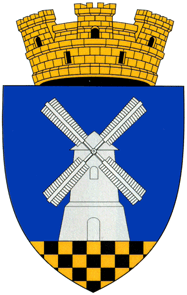
- Flag Seal

- Location within Moldova
- Coordinates: 47°5′N 28°11′E
- Country: Moldova
- District: Nisporeni
- First reference: 1618

Area
  - Total: 14 km^{2} (5.4 sq mi)
- Elevation: 99 m (325 ft)

Population (2014)
  - Total: 10,063
  - Density: 720/km^{2} (1,900/sq mi)
- Time zone: UTC+2 (EET)
  - Summer (DST): UTC+3 (EEST)
- Climate: Dfb
- Website: primarianisporeni.md

Nisporeni (Romanian pronunciation: [nispoˈrenʲ]) is a town in Moldova and the administrative center of Nisporeni District.

== History ==
The first historical appearance was in 1618.

The Romanian People's Salvation Cross, the largest cross in Moldova, was built in 2011 in Nisporeni.

== Demographics ==
According to the 2014 census, the population of Nisporeni amounted to 10,063 inhabitants, a decrease compared to the previous census in 2004, when 12,105 inhabitants were registered. Of these, 4,895 were men and 5,168 were women.

Ethnic composition of Nisporeni (2014)
1. Moldovans* (80.5%)
2. Romanians (17.9%)
3. Russians (0.65%)
4. Others (0.94%)
:Linguistic composition of Nisporeni (2014)
1. Moldovan* (59.8%)
2. Romanian (38.8%)
3. Russian (1.00%)
4. Other (0.40%)

Footnotes:

* There is an ongoing controversy regarding the ethnic identification of Moldovans and Romanians.

* Moldovan language is one of the two local names for the Romanian language in Moldova. In 2013, the Constitutional Court of Moldova interpreted that Article 13 of the constitution is superseded by the Declaration of Independence, thus giving official status to the name Romanian.

Historical population
Year	Pop.	±%
1930	5,975	—
1970	11,297	+89.1%
1979	13,489	+19.4%
1989	15,663	+16.1%
2004	12,105	−22.7%
2014	10,063	−16.9%

== Sport ==
Speranța Nisporeni is based in the city.

== Media ==
- Albasat TV
- Vocea Basarabiei, 105,7

== Notable people ==
- Vladimir Andronachi
- Ion Munteanu
- Ciobanu Liandru

== Twin towns – sister cities ==
Nisporeni is twinned with:

- Lugoj, Romania

== Image gallery ==
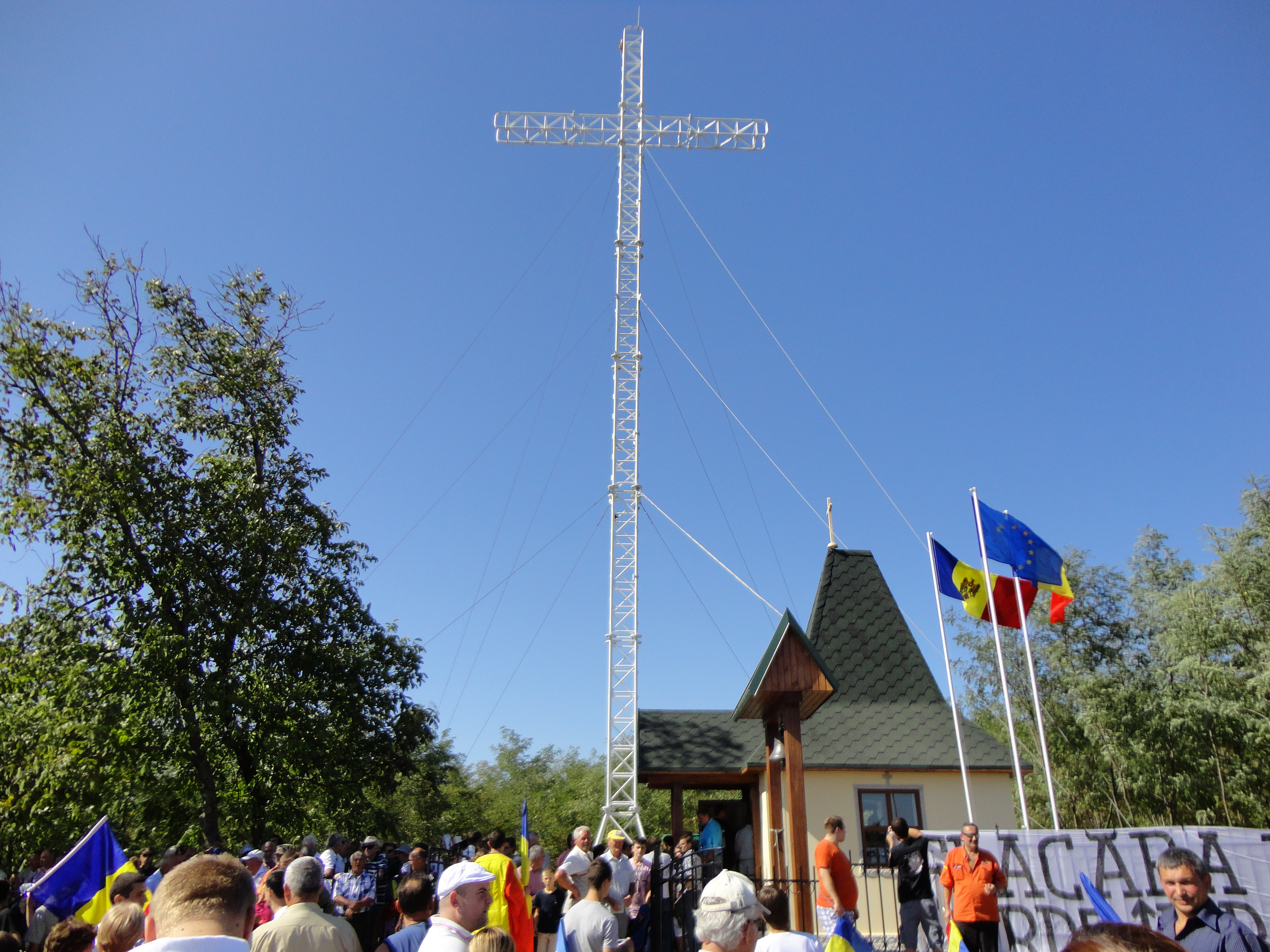
Romanian People's Salvation Cross

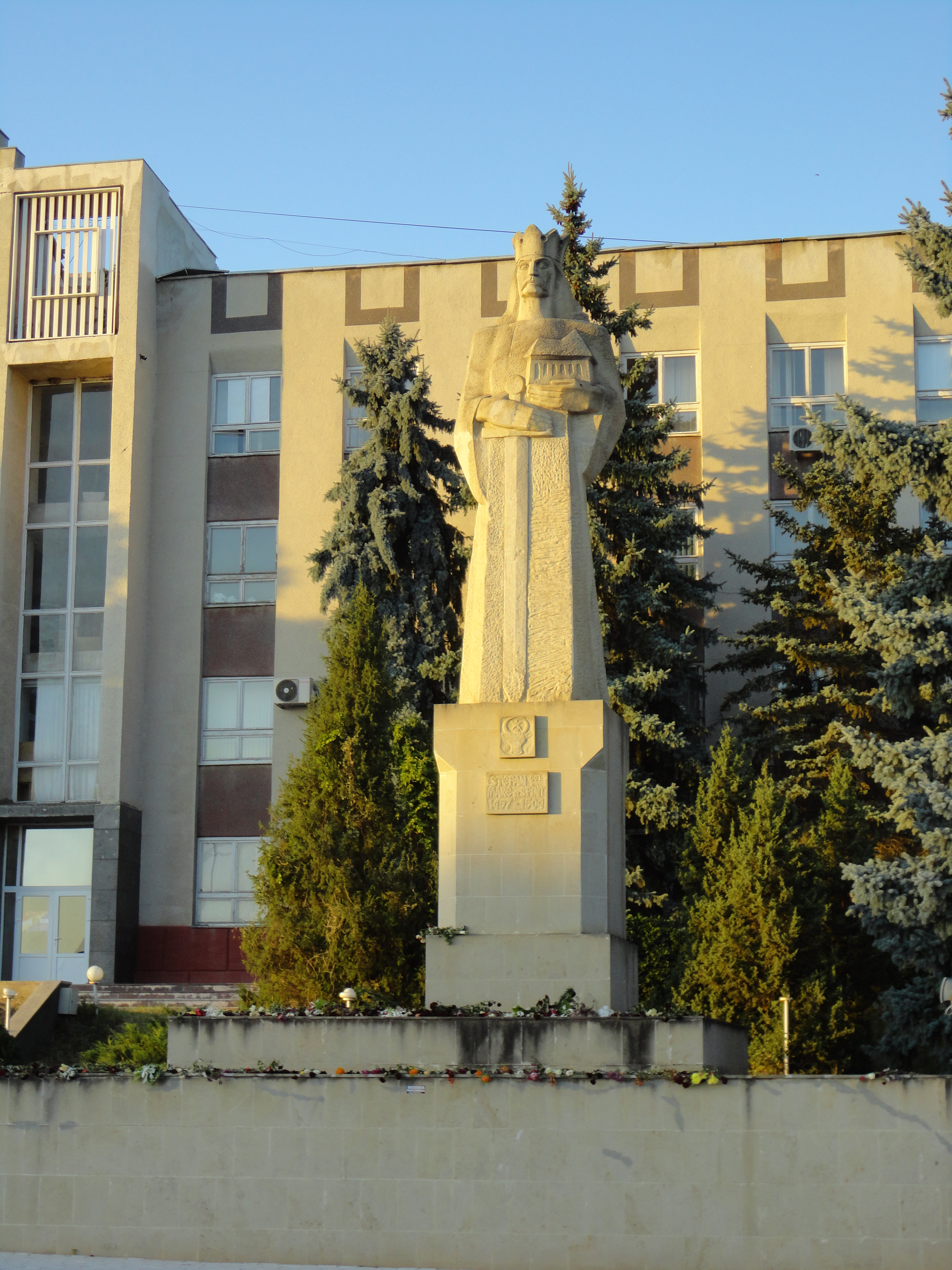
Stephen the Great monument

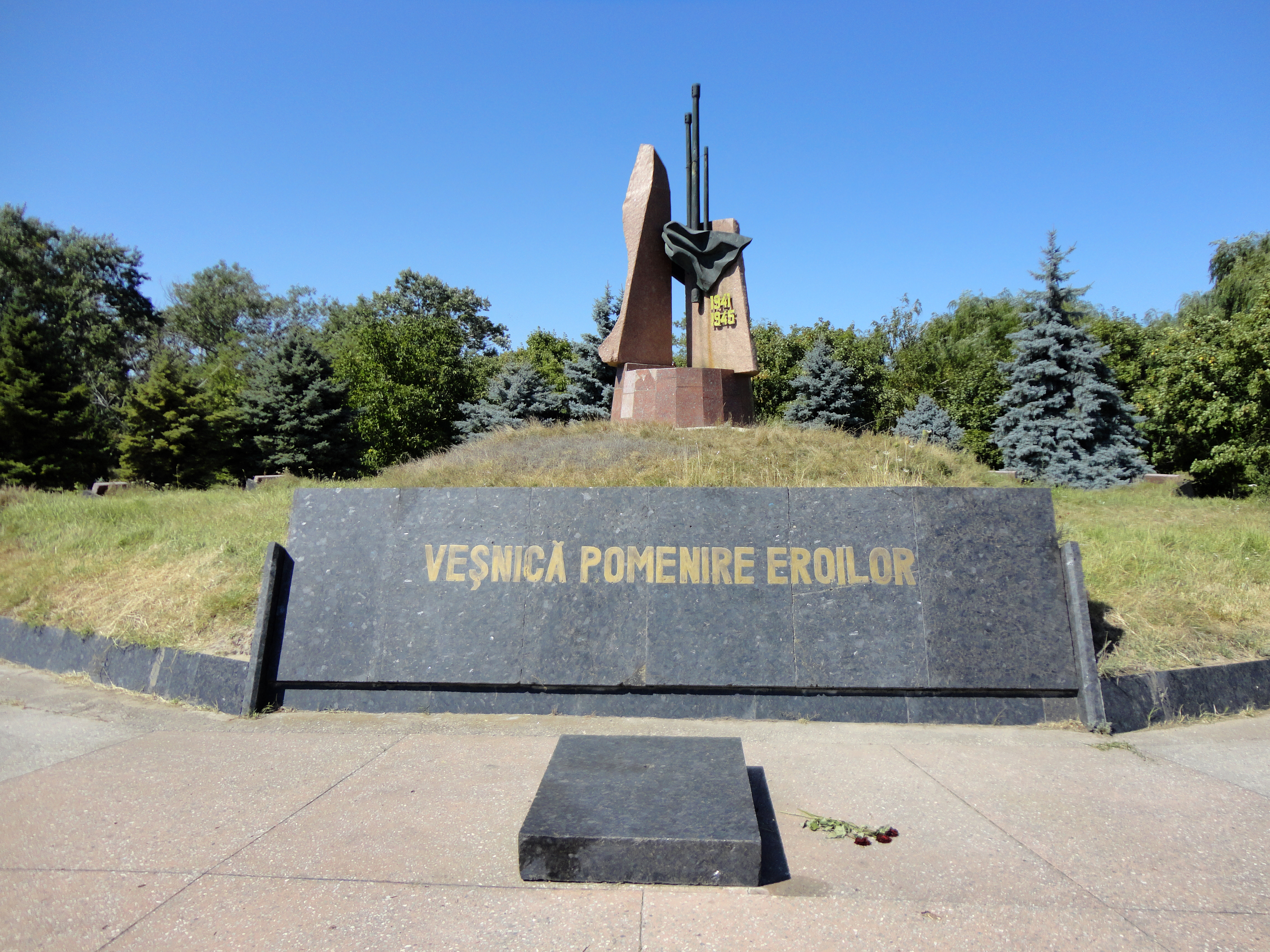
Monument dedicated to the soldiers who fell in World War II
