= 2024 Socca World Cup =

Socca competition

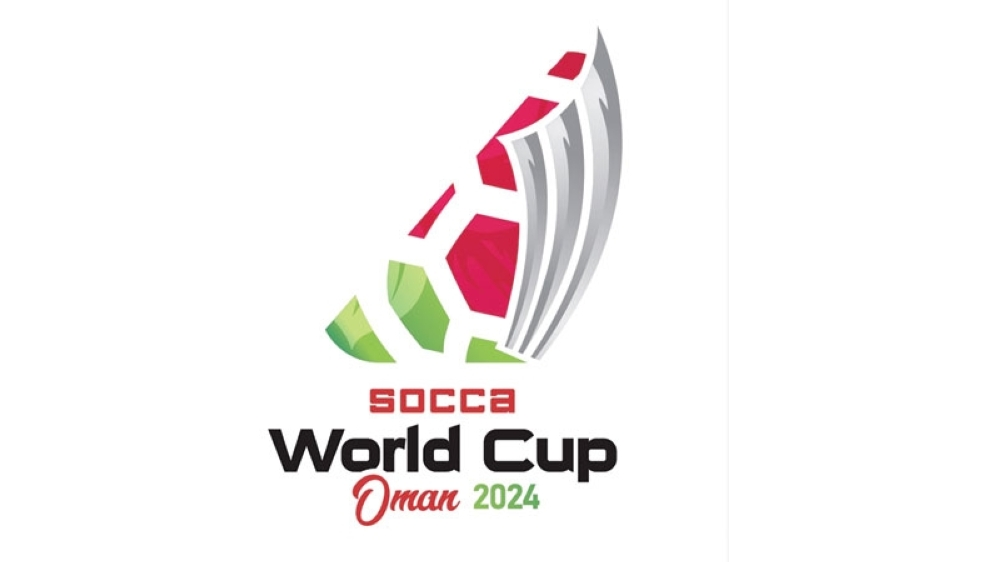
- Location: Muscat, Oman
- Dates: 29 November–7 December 2024
- Nations: 40

Medalists
| gold medal | Oman |
| silver medal | Kazakhstan |
| bronze medal | Croatia |

The 2024 Socca World Cup was held from 29 November to 7 December 2024 in Muscat, Oman. The official draw was held on 29 October 2024.

== Group stage ==
=== Group A ===
| Pos | Team | Pld | W | D | L | GF | GA | GD | Pts | Qualification |
|---|---|---|---|---|---|---|---|---|---|---|
| 1 | Oman (H) | 4 | 4 | 0 | 0 | 8 | 2 | +6 | 12 | Knockout stage |
| 2 | Italy | 4 | 2 | 1 | 1 | 13 | 7 | +6 | 7 | Knockout stage |
| 3 | Qatar | 4 | 2 | 1 | 1 | 8 | 2 | +6 | 7 | |
| 4 | United States | 4 | 1 | 0 | 3 | 6 | 13 | −7 | 3 | |
| 5 | Canada | 4 | 0 | 0 | 4 | 4 | 15 | −11 | 0 | |

First match(es) will be played: Nov 2024. Source:
Rules for classification: Group stage tiebreakers
(H) Hosts
29 November 2024
20:00

| Oman | 3–1 | Italy |
|---|---|---|
| Al. Al Balushi 28'; Al Harthi 40'; Al Shamsi 41' | | dos Santos 10' |

30 November 2024
9:00

| Canada | 0–3 | Qatar |
|---|---|---|
| | | Assaam 20'; bin Hamroosh 39', 40' |

30 November 2024
20:00

| United States | 0–1 | Oman |
|---|---|---|
| | | L. Al-Wahaibi 21' |

1 December 2024
9:00

| Italy | 5–1 | Canada |
|---|---|---|
| Gallinica 4'; dos Santos 5'; Fumes 8'; Caputo 24'; de Vitto 27' | | Lindsay 6' |

1 December 2024
15:00

| Qatar | 4–0 | United States |
|---|---|---|
| Abdurahman 4', 9', 28', 37' |

2 December 2024
20:00

| Canada | 1–3 | Oman |
|---|---|---|
| Lindsay 35' | | Al Hadi 15'; Al Shamsi 22'; M. Al Balushi 35' |

3 December 2024
9:00

| Qatar | 1–1 | Italy |
|---|---|---|
| Abdurahman 39' | | Santos 43' |

3 December 2024
20:00

| United States | 4–2 | Canada |
|---|---|---|
| Lopez 8', 38'; Serrano 19'; de Anda 25' | | Vojnovic 22'; Godic 36' |

4 December 2024
20:00

| Oman | 1–0 | Qatar |
|---|---|---|
| Al Hadi 25' |

5 December 2024
19:00

| Italy | 6–2 | United States |
|---|---|---|
| Santos 3', 19', 27', 34'; Caputo 26'; Grippi 28' | | Lopez 4'; Magallanes 16' |

=== Group B ===
| Pos | Team | Pld | W | D | L | GF | GA | GD | Pts | Qualification |
|---|---|---|---|---|---|---|---|---|---|---|
| 1 | Serbia | 4 | 4 | 0 | 0 | 13 | 5 | +8 | 12 | Knockout stage |
| 2 | Germany | 4 | 3 | 0 | 1 | 20 | 9 | +11 | 9 | Knockout stage |
| 3 | Bulgaria | 4 | 2 | 0 | 2 | 4 | 7 | −3 | 6 | |
| 4 | Georgia | 4 | 1 | 0 | 3 | 7 | 14 | −7 | 3 | |
| 5 | Libya | 4 | 0 | 0 | 4 | 5 | 14 | −9 | 0 | |

First match(es) will be played: Nov 2024. Source:
Rules for classification: Group stage tiebreakers
29 November 2024
11:00

| Libya | 2–3 | Serbia |
|---|---|---|
| Shaklawoon 16'; Algayed 40' | | Baranin 14', 28'; Damjanovic 27' |

29 November 2024
22:00

| Bulgaria | 0–5 | Germany |
|---|---|---|
| | | Metidji 13'; Goker 29'; Fricke 31'; Chahrour 35'; Kramer 36' |

30 November 2024
15:00

| Georgia | 3–0 | Libya |
|---|---|---|
| Bliadze 3'; Jaliashvili 35'; Lemhammel 42' (o.g.) |

1 December 2024
10:00

| Serbia | 1–0 | Bulgaria |
|---|---|---|
| Mikic 31' |

1 December 2024
19:00

| Germany | 6–2 | Georgia |
|---|---|---|
| Metidji 2'; Betz 12', 20'; Hebbeker 21'; Reinold 32'; Sulmer 40' | | Jaliashvili 8', 38' |

2 December 2024
17:00

| Bulgaria | 1–0 | Libya |
|---|---|---|
| Kuzmanov 23' |

3 December 2024
10:00

| Libya | 3–7 | Germany |
|---|---|---|
| Alahrash 8'; Algayed 12'; Abusharud 32' | | Sulmer 5', 9'; Metidji 7'; Haitz 9'; Anan 11', 35'; Chandra 29' |

3 December 2024
22:00

| Georgia | 1–5 | Serbia |
|---|---|---|
| Jaliashvili 23' | | Perendija 4'; Baranin 8', 39'; Popadic 22'; Mikic 38' |

4 December 2024
18:00

| Serbia | 4–2 | Germany |
|---|---|---|
| Perendija 8'; Mikic 9', 41'; Damjanovic 43' | | Hebbeker 3', 24' |

4 December 2024
22:00

| Bulgaria | 3–1 | Georgia |
|---|---|---|
| Angushev 14'; Hristov 17'; Dobrichov 31' | | Kiknadze 28' |

=== Group C ===
| Pos | Team | Pld | W | D | L | GF | GA | GD | Pts | Qualification |
|---|---|---|---|---|---|---|---|---|---|---|
| 1 | Belgium | 4 | 2 | 2 | 0 | 5 | 1 | +4 | 8 | Knockout stage |
| 2 | Iraq | 4 | 2 | 1 | 1 | 8 | 3 | +5 | 7 | Knockout stage |
| 3 | Greece | 4 | 1 | 3 | 0 | 6 | 3 | +3 | 6 | |
| 4 | Cyprus | 4 | 1 | 2 | 1 | 3 | 3 | 0 | 5 | |
| 5 | Kuwait | 4 | 0 | 0 | 4 | 0 | 12 | −12 | 0 | |

First match(es) will be played: Nov 2024. Source:
Rules for classification: Group stage tiebreakers
29 November 2024
12:00

| Kuwait | 0–3 (w/o) | Iraq |

30 November 2024
17:00

| Greece | 1–1 | Belgium |
|---|---|---|
| Goulas 31' | | Debouck 34' |

1 December 2024
17:00

| Kuwait | 0–3 (w/o) | Greece |

1 December 2024
18:00

| Belgium | 0–0 | Cyprus |

2 December 2024
9:00

| Cyprus | 3–0 (w/o) | Kuwait |

2 December 2024
21:00

| Iraq | 2–2 | Greece |
|---|---|---|
| Kadhim 4'; Mahmoud 41' | | Chatzis 25', 38' |

3 December 2024
21:00

| Iraq | 0–1 | Belgium |
|---|---|---|
| | | Cojocaru 40' |

4 December 2024
19:00

| Greece | 0–0 | Cyprus |

5 December 2024
17:00

| Cyprus | 0–3 | Iraq |
|---|---|---|
| | | Kadhim 15'; Unknown Player 29'; Ali 39' |

5 December 2024
20:00

| Belgium | 3–0 (w/o) | Kuwait |

=== Group D ===
| Pos | Team | Pld | W | D | L | GF | GA | GD | Pts | Qualification |
|---|---|---|---|---|---|---|---|---|---|---|
| 1 | Brazil | 4 | 4 | 0 | 0 | 11 | 1 | +10 | 12 | Knockout stage |
| 2 | Egypt | 4 | 3 | 0 | 1 | 11 | 3 | +8 | 9 | Knockout stage |
| 3 | Ireland | 4 | 1 | 1 | 2 | 5 | 7 | −2 | 4 | |
| 4 | Iran | 4 | 0 | 2 | 2 | 6 | 12 | −6 | 2 | |
| 5 | Colombia | 4 | 0 | 1 | 3 | 5 | 15 | −10 | 1 | |

First match(es) will be played: Nov 2024. Source:
Rules for classification: Group stage tiebreakers
29 November 2024
21:00

| Egypt | 1–2 | Brazil |
|---|---|---|
| Raafat 26' | | Drope 7'; Seringa 40' |

30 November 2024
10:00

| Iran | 2–2 | Ireland |
|---|---|---|
| Maosule 7'; Mansouri Fahim 28' | | Power 15'; Proudfoot 34' |

1 December 2024
11:00

| Colombia | 4–4 | Iran |
|---|---|---|
| Ospina 18'; Pallares 21'; Echeverri 28'; Granados 37' | | Shamsniajahromi 9'; Mansouri Fahim 24', 33'; Kohrasgani 38' |

1 December 2024
21:00

| Ireland | 0–2 | Egypt |
|---|---|---|
| | | Salama 4'; Taha 36' |

2 December 2024
10:00

| Colombia | 0–3 | Brazil |
|---|---|---|
| | | Drope 10', 40'; Facao 13' |

3 December 2024
17:00

| Brazil | 3–0 | Ireland |
|---|---|---|
| Drope 4', 5'; Edda 33' |

3 December 2024
23:00

| Egypt | 5–1 | Colombia |
|---|---|---|
| Mahsoub 9'; Taha 18'; Aly 23', 27'; Raafat 35' | | Echeverri 40' |

4 December 2024
21:00

| Brazil | 3–0 | Iran |
|---|---|---|
| Seringa 33'; Facao 36'; Mamu 37' |

5 December 2024
21:00

| Iran | 0–3 | Egypt |
|---|---|---|
| | | Raafat 14'; Taha 25'; Aly 42' |

5 December 2024
23:00

| Ireland | 3–0 | Colombia |
|---|---|---|
| Ryan 3'; Mimnagh 13'; Carolan 15' |

=== Group E ===
| Pos | Team | Pld | W | D | L | GF | GA | GD | Pts | Qualification |
|---|---|---|---|---|---|---|---|---|---|---|
| 1 | Poland | 4 | 4 | 0 | 0 | 17 | 3 | +14 | 12 | Knockout stage |
| 2 | France | 4 | 2 | 1 | 1 | 9 | 4 | +5 | 7 | Knockout stage |
| 3 | Turkey | 4 | 2 | 0 | 2 | 5 | 11 | −6 | 6 | |
| 4 | Pakistan | 4 | 1 | 1 | 2 | 4 | 5 | −1 | 4 | |
| 5 | Haiti | 4 | 0 | 0 | 4 | 2 | 14 | −12 | 0 | |

First match(es) will be played: Nov 2024. Source:
Rules for classification: Group stage tiebreakers
29 November 2024
9:00

| Pakistan | 3–0 (w/o) | Haiti |

30 November 2024
21:00

| Turkey | 0–4 | France |
|---|---|---|
| | | Asselineau 1', 37'; Cissé 15'; Vamba 35' |

1 December 2024
16:00

| Haiti | 0–3 (w/o) | Turkey |

2 December 2024
18:00

| France | 1–3 | Poland |
|---|---|---|
| Huertos 41' | | Jaszczak 8', 10'; Kucharski 38' |

2 December 2024
23:00

| Turkey | 2–0 | Pakistan |
|---|---|---|
| Varicioglu 2', 21' |

3 December 2024
11:00

| Poland | 4–1 | Haiti |
|---|---|---|
| Nowakowski 8'; Debicki 14', 23'; Linca 31' | | Nordeus 35' |

4 December 2024
11:00

| Poland | 7–0 | Turkey |
|---|---|---|
| Kucharski 10', 38'; Mierzejewski 18'; Hat 21'; Jaszczak 23', 40'; Nowakowski 32' |

4 December 2024
17:00

| France | 0–0 | Pakistan |

5 December 2024
11:00

| Pakistan | 1–3 | Poland |
|---|---|---|
| Khan 25' | | Piorkowski 1'; Nowakowski 16'; Debicki 35' |

5 December 2024
18:00

| Haiti | 1–4 | France |
|---|---|---|
| Lysius 11' | | Labaig 22'; Vamba 27'; Asselineau 29'; Belbachir 38' |

=== Group F ===
| Pos | Team | Pld | W | D | L | GF | GA | GD | Pts | Qualification |
|---|---|---|---|---|---|---|---|---|---|---|
| 1 | Mexico | 4 | 3 | 0 | 1 | 12 | 4 | +8 | 9 | Knockout stage |
| 2 | Albania | 4 | 3 | 0 | 1 | 7 | 5 | +2 | 9 | Knockout stage |
| 3 | Peru | 4 | 3 | 0 | 1 | 6 | 8 | −2 | 9 | |
| 4 | Latvia | 4 | 1 | 0 | 3 | 5 | 7 | −2 | 3 | |
| 5 | Australia | 4 | 0 | 0 | 4 | 3 | 9 | −6 | 0 | |

First match(es) will be played: Nov 2024. Source:
Rules for classification: Group stage tiebreakers
30 November 2024
11:00

| Australia | 1–2 | Albania |
|---|---|---|
| Ramandi 16' | | Kaca 2'; Hoxha 39' |

30 November 2024
22:00

| Latvia | 1–2 | Mexico |
|---|---|---|
| Korsaks 40' | | del Rio 30'; Gonzalez 34' |

1 December 2024
23:00

| Albania | 0–2 | Peru |
|---|---|---|
| | | Brousset 12', 35' |

2 December 2024
11:00

| Australia | 1–2 | Latvia |
|---|---|---|
| Azzone 23' | | Korsaks 23'; Vītolnieks 39' |

2 December 2024
19:00

| Peru | 0–6 | Mexico |
|---|---|---|
| | | Pulido 2', 20'; Meza 3', 5'; Gonzalez 31'; Morales 34' |

3 December 2024
16:00

| Albania | 2–1 | Latvia |
|---|---|---|
| Hoxha 15'; Leci 28' | | Knapsis 23' |

4 December 2024
9:00

| Mexico | 3–0 | Australia |
|---|---|---|
| Ochoa 1'; Meza 26'; Aguirre 38' |

4 December 2024
16:00

| Latvia | 1–2 | Peru |
|---|---|---|
| Korsaks 38' | | Castro 37'; Otero 38' |

5 December 2024
15:00

| Mexico | 1–3 | Albania |
|---|---|---|
| Pulido 36' | | Gapi 22'; Tepshi 29'; Kaca 35' |

5 December 2024
22:00

| Peru | 2–1 | Australia |
|---|---|---|
| Howe 26' (o.g.); Castillo 40' | | Azzone 43' |

=== Group G ===
| Pos | Team | Pld | W | D | L | GF | GA | GD | Pts | Qualification |
|---|---|---|---|---|---|---|---|---|---|---|
| 1 | Romania | 4 | 3 | 0 | 1 | 11 | 2 | +9 | 9 | Knockout stage |
| 2 | Kazakhstan | 4 | 3 | 0 | 1 | 8 | 3 | +5 | 9 | Knockout stage |
| 3 | Uruguay | 4 | 2 | 0 | 2 | 11 | 9 | +2 | 6 | |
| 4 | Sudan | 4 | 2 | 0 | 2 | 5 | 8 | −3 | 6 | |
| 5 | England | 4 | 0 | 0 | 4 | 1 | 14 | −13 | 0 | |

First match(es) will be played: Nov 2024. Source:
Rules for classification: Group stage tiebreakers
29 November 2024
23:00

| Sudan | 1–0 | England |
|---|---|---|
| W. Mohamed 25' |

30 November 2024
16:00

| Uruguay | 3–2 | Kazakhstan |
|---|---|---|
| Ordoaui 4'; Matias 8'; Volz 36' | | Adilov 3'; Zharlgaganov 39' |

30 November 2024
19:00

| Sudan | 0–3 | Romania |
|---|---|---|
| | | Catalin 22' (pen.); Elsheikhidris 30' (o.g.); Isac 32' |

1 December 2024
22:00

| Kazakhstan | 1–0 | Romania |
|---|---|---|
| Taibassarov 38' |

2 December 2024
22:00

| England | 0–5 | Uruguay |
|---|---|---|
| | | Diaz 7', 9', 12', 14'; Rodriguez 25' |

3 December 2024
18:00

| Romania | 5–1 | England |
|---|---|---|
| Andy 1'; Ilie 7'; George 10'; Razvan 16'; Burciu 37' | | Lock 25' |

3 December 2024
19:00

| Kazakhstan | 2–0 | Sudan |
|---|---|---|
| Ayankhan 31'; Taibassarov 39' |

4 December 2024
10:00

| Uruguay | 3–4 | Sudan |
|---|---|---|
| Puppi 34'; Volz 35', 43' | | Bardam 26', 26', 41'; Mohammed 40' |

5 December 2024
10:00

| England | 0–3 | Kazakhstan |
|---|---|---|
| | | Zabogonskiy 6'; Kenzhegulov 25'; Adilov 33' |

5 December 2024
16:00

| Romania | 3–0 | Uruguay |
|---|---|---|
| Catalin 29'; Paul 34'; Toma 40' |

=== Group H ===
| Pos | Team | Pld | W | D | L | GF | GA | GD | Pts | Qualification |
|---|---|---|---|---|---|---|---|---|---|---|
| 1 | Croatia | 4 | 3 | 1 | 0 | 14 | 6 | +8 | 10 | Knockout stage |
| 2 | Hungary | 4 | 2 | 2 | 0 | 16 | 8 | +8 | 8 | Knockout stage |
| 3 | Argentina | 4 | 2 | 0 | 2 | 9 | 12 | −3 | 6 | |
| 4 | South Africa | 4 | 1 | 0 | 3 | 11 | 17 | −6 | 3 | |
| 5 | Tunisia | 4 | 0 | 1 | 3 | 8 | 15 | −7 | 1 | |

First match(es) will be played: Nov 2024. Source:
Rules for classification: Group stage tiebreakers
29 November 2024
10:00

| Tunisia | 2–6 | South Africa |
|---|---|---|
| Timoumi 9'; Harbaoui 41' | | Ebrahim 8'; Sanssouchie 12'; Koert 15', 31', 33'; Moodley 38' |

30 November 2024
18:00

| Tunisia | 1–2 | Argentina |
|---|---|---|
| Timoumi 9' | | Peralta 21'; Ortileb 38' |

30 November 2024
23:00

| Hungary | 2–2 | Croatia |
|---|---|---|
| Huszty 20'; Soron 21' | | Medak 35'; Darojkovic 39' |

1 December 2024
20:00

| Croatia | 5–2 | South Africa |
|---|---|---|
| Culjak 12'; Filipovic 22', 35'; Haluska 31'; Darojkovic 34' | | Garcia 3'; Moonsamy 5' |

2 December 2024
15:00

| Croatia | 4–1 | Argentina |
|---|---|---|
| Darojkovic 10'; Culjak 17'; Skorin 24'; Filipovic 32' | | Loiesau 23' |

2 December 2024
16:00

| Hungary | 4–4 | Tunisia |
|---|---|---|
| Szabo 2', 13'; Petric 21'; Huszty 42' | | Harbaoui 2'; Jammali 27'; Sfaxi 33'; Timoumi 34' |

3 December 2024
15:00

| South Africa | 2–4 | Hungary |
|---|---|---|
| Moonsamy 22', 41' | | Soron 5'; Szabo 15'; Varga 25'; Szacsko 42' |

4 December 2024
15:00

| South Africa | 1–6 | Argentina |
|---|---|---|
| Garcia 36' | | Malizia 8', 9', 28'; Peralta 17'; Simoni 28'; Astarloa 30' |

4 December 2024
23:00

| Tunisia | 1–3 | Croatia |
|---|---|---|
| Jdid 39' | | Medak 21', 41'; Hajdic 37' |

5 December 2024
9:00

| Argentina | 0–6 | Hungary |
|---|---|---|
| | | Szabo 9'; Nadimov 17'; Tolnay 22'; Soron 23'; Ficsor 30'; Voros-Torma 36' |

== Knockout phase ==
=== Bracket ===
Round of 16
Croatia | 1
Italy | 0
Mexico | 3
Iraq | 2
Serbia | 2
Kazakhstan | 4
Brazil | 2
France | 0
Romania | 1 (3)
Germany | 1 (2)
Poland | 6
Egypt | 0
Oman | 2
Hungary | 1
Belgium | 0
Albania | 3

Quarterfinals
Croatia | 4
Mexico | 2
Kazakhstan | 3
Brazil | 2
Romania | 3 (2)
Poland | 3 (0)
Oman | 2
Albania | 1

Semifinals
Croatia | 2
Kazakhstan | 4
Romania | 1
Oman | 3

Final
Kazakhstan | 1 (0)
Oman | 1 (1)
Third place
Croatia | 2
Romania | 0

=== Round of 16 ===
6 December 2024
9:00

| Croatia | 1–0 | Italy |
|---|---|---|
| Darojković 35' |

6 December 2024
10:05

| Mexico | 3–2 | Iraq |
|---|---|---|
| Meza 6', 19'; Ochoa 7' | | Kadhim 27'; Jasim 41' |

6 December 2024
11:10

| Serbia | 2–4 | Kazakhstan |
|---|---|---|
| Damjanovic 22', 39' | | Islambek 21'; Abdrassilov 32', 41'; Adilov 41' |

6 December 2024
12:15

| Brazil | 2–0 | France |
|---|---|---|
| Edda 17'; Seringa 42' |

6 December 2024
15:20

| Romania | 1–1 | Germany |
|---|---|---|
| Burciu 33' | | Sulmer 9' |
Penalties
| Catalin (penalty scored); Iosua (penalty scored); Burciu (penalty scored) | 3–2 | Bezerea (penalty scored); Metidji (penalty scored) |

6 December 2024
16:25

| Poland | 6–0 | Egypt |
|---|---|---|
| Debicki 1', 9'; Piorkowski 14'; Jaszczak 18'; Nowakowski 28'; Bienias 33' |

6 December 2024
17:30

| Oman | 2–1 | Hungary |
|---|---|---|
| Al Shamsi 35'; M. Al Balushi 37' | | Szabo 16' |

6 December 2024
18:35

| Belgium | 0–3 | Albania |
|---|---|---|
| | | Leci 3'; Kaca 8'; Shala 18' |

=== Quarterfinals ===
6 December 2024
19:40

| Croatia | 4–2 | Mexico |
|---|---|---|
| Culjak 20'; Gonzalez 21' (o.g.); Filipovic 23'; Darojkovic 30' | | Pulido 11'; Villalba 31' |

6 December 2024
20:45

| Kazakhstan | 3–2 | Brazil |
|---|---|---|
| Berdibek 14'; Kenzhegulov 21'; Taibassarov 24' | | Drope 1'; Seringa 19' |

6 December 2024
21:50

| Romania | 3–3 | Poland |
|---|---|---|
| Burciu 8'; Toma 33'; Razvan 39' | | Jaszczak 13', 42', 43' |
Penalties
| Catalin (penalty scored); Burciu (penalty scored) | 2–0 | Jaszczak (penalty missed); Linca (penalty missed) |

6 December 2024
22:55

| Oman | 2–1 | Albania |
|---|---|---|
| A. Al Harthi 31'; Balushi 40' | | Ademi 9' |

=== Semifinals ===
7 December 2024
10:00

| Croatia | 2–4 | Kazakhstan |
|---|---|---|
| Francekovic 15'; Hajdic 36' | | Adilov 13'; Yelmessov 21'; Kenzhegulov 21'; Taibassarov 40' |

7 December 2024
11:15

| Romania | 1–3 | Oman |
|---|---|---|
| H. Paul 27' | | Al Wahaibi 2'; M. Al Balushi 24'; Al Harthi 27' |

=== Third place ===
7 December 2024
18:30

| Croatia | 2–0 | Romania |
|---|---|---|
| Vidicek 32'; Darojkovic 37' |

=== Final ===
7 December 2024
20:00

| Kazakhstan | 1–1 | Oman |
|---|---|---|
| Taibassarov 38' | | M. Al Shamsi 29' |
Penalties
| Yelemessov (penalty missed); Islambek (penalty missed); Kenzhegulov (penalty missed) | 0–1 | M. Al Shamsi (penalty scored); M. Al Balushi (penalty missed) |
