= 2023 Socca World Cup =

Socca competition

- Location: Essen, Germany
- Dates: 2–11 June 2023
- Nations: 44

Medalists
gold medal	Kazakhstan
silver medal	Ukraine
bronze medal	Mexico

The 2023 Socca World Cup was held from 2 to 11 June 2023 in Essen, Germany. The official draw was held on 27 April 2023. Kazakhstan became the world champions defeating Ukraine in the final. Mexico took third place.

== Group stage ==
=== Group A ===
Pos	Team	Pld	W	D	L	GF	GA	GD	Pts	Qualification
1	Germany (H)	3	3	0	0	14	5	+9	9	Advance to knockout phase
2	Oman	3	2	0	1	7	6	+1	6	Advance to knockout phase
3	Cyprus	3	1	0	2	1	3	−2	3	Advance to knockout phase
4	Chile	3	0	0	3	3	11	−8	0	

Source: International Socca Federation
(H) Hosts
2 June 2023
21:00

Germany	1–0	Cyprus
Kühle 26'

3 June 2023
09:00

Chile	1–2	Oman
Córdova 12'		Al-Maharmi 23'; Al-Alawi 40'

4 June 2023
15:00

Chile	0–1	Cyprus
		Andreou 32'

4 June 2023
20:00

Germany	5–3	Oman
Zierden 7', 9', 40'; Haitz 21'; Benfarji 35'		Al-Maharmi 31'; Al-Alawi 32', 42'

6 June 2023
20:00

Germany	8–2	Chile
Kühle 21'; Haitz 22'; Zierden 25', 38'; Evers 27', 31'; Sündermann 30'; Benfarji 39'		Veas 2'; Lineros 33'

7 June 2023
17:00

Oman	2–0	Cyprus
Al-Maharmi 30'; Al-Riyami 39'

=== Group B ===
Pos	Team	Pld	W	D	L	GF	GA	GD	Pts	Qualification
1	Mexico	3	3	0	0	14	0	+14	9	Advance to knockout phase
2	Croatia	3	2	0	1	20	3	+17	6	Advance to knockout phase
3	Costa Rica	3	1	0	2	2	10	−8	3	
4	Syria	3	0	0	3	2	25	−23	0	

Source: International Socca Federation
3 June 2023
12:00

Mexico	11–0	Syria
Alcaraz 3', 20'; R. Hernández 6'; Damián 6', 17', 25', 36', 40'; Fierros 23'; Rosas 30'; Guzmán 37'

3 June 2023
15:00

Croatia	8–0	Costa Rica
Ljubas 7'; Sinani 10', 30'; Pest-Mundvajl 18'; Mikleušević 20', 23', 40'; Haramustek 28'

4 June 2023
09:00

Costa Rica	2–0	Syria
D. Hernández 30'; Flores 31'

5 June 2023
21:00

Mexico	1–0	Croatia
Fierros 12'

6 June 2023
17:00

Croatia	12–2	Syria
Mikleušević 3'; Romić 4', 15'; Sinani 8', 10'; Herent 11'; Haluška 29', 31'; Čović 34'; Haramustek 39'; Karamarković 40', 41'		Kaskas 32'; Sarmini 40'

7 June 2023
18:00

Mexico	2–0	Costa Rica
Damián 16'; Barahona 36'

=== Group C ===
Pos	Team	Pld	W	D	L	GF	GA	GD	Pts	Qualification
1	China	3	1	2	0	14	4	+10	5	Advance to knockout phase
2	France	3	1	2	0	13	3	+10	5	Advance to knockout phase
3	Latvia	3	1	2	0	9	4	+5	5	Advance to knockout phase
4	Kuwait	3	0	0	3	1	26	−25	0	

Source: International Socca Federation
3 June 2023
10:00

France	10–0	Kuwait
Rozier 8', 14'; Meilhon 10'; Manias 11', 25', 27'; Vamba 16'; Jastier 22', 40'; Colacicco 33'

3 June 2023
14:00

Latvia	2–2	China
Pakalns 15'; Knapšis 27'		Che 25'; Wang HW 39'

5 June 2023
18:00

France	1–1	China
Belbachir 22'		Wu 12'

5 June 2023
20:00

Latvia	5–0	Kuwait
Pakalns 4', 30'; Stabulnieks 14', 20'; Sveķis 40'

6 June 2023
12:00

China	11–1	Kuwait
Wang HW 16'; Zhang 20', 22', 33'; Wang TY 22', 30', 35'; Wu 25', 28'; Zhong 26'; Feng 29'		Ali 17'

7 June 2023
16:00

France	2–2	Latvia
Huertos 1'; Colacicco 8'		Knapšis 5'; Stabulnieks 15'

=== Group D ===
Pos	Team	Pld	W	D	L	GF	GA	GD	Pts	Qualification
1	Brazil	3	3	0	0	11	1	+10	9	Advance to knockout phase
2	Hungary	3	2	0	1	10	4	+6	6	Advance to knockout phase
3	Turkey	3	1	0	2	6	7	−1	3	Advance to knockout phase
4	Ivory Coast	3	0	0	3	0	15	−15	0	

Source: International Socca Federation
3 June 2023
19:00

Brazil	5–0	Ivory Coast

3 June 2023
21:00

Hungary	4–1	Turkey
Hollauer 13', 22', 32'; Irhás 36'		Bozlar 40'

4 June 2023
14:00

Turkey	5–0	Ivory Coast

5 June 2023
15:00

Brazil	3–1	Hungary
Reis 3'; de Jesus 20'; Neiva 37'		Bognár 7'

6 June 2023
16:00

Hungary	5–0	Ivory Coast

7 June 2023
21:00

Brazil	3–0	Turkey
Soares 6'; Ferreira 19'; Brum 39'

=== Group E ===
Pos	Team	Pld	W	D	L	GF	GA	GD	Pts	Qualification
1	Ukraine	3	3	0	0	21	4	+17	9	Advance to knockout phase
2	Egypt	3	1	1	1	9	7	+2	4	Advance to knockout phase
3	Kazakhstan	3	1	1	1	6	8	−2	4	Advance to knockout phase
4	Libya	3	0	0	3	4	21	−17	0	

Source: International Socca Federation
3 June 2023
11:00

Kazakhstan	3–1	Libya
Kazak 4'; Taibassarov 7'; Yelemessov 24'		Al-Shuweesheen 21'

5 June 2023
17:00

Ukraine	5–0	Egypt
Kolesnykov 14'; Khrul 16'; Shaidiuk 28'; Litvinov 33'; Sandetskyi 37'

4 June 2023
13:00

Kazakhstan	1–1	Egypt
Taibassarov 35'		Abdalla 29'

7 June 2023
11:00

Ukraine	10–2	Libya
Urutskyi 5'; Ivanov 14', 19'; Litvinov 20', 32'; Tsopa 27', 35', 37'; Khrul 38'; Rivnyi 40'		Al-Shuweesheen 24'; Fenesha 27'

6 June 2023
10:00

Egypt	8–1	Libya
Khaled 9'; Noureldin 15'; Abdelrahman 20'; Hosny 20'; Al-Muzoughi 25'; Shalaby 35'; Aziz 40', 41'		Al-Grabli 34'

6 June 2023
13:00

Kazakhstan	2–6	Ukraine
Avutov 21'; Taibassarov 39'		Shaidiuk 10'; Ivanov 17', 22', 31', 38'; Khrul 17'

=== Group F ===
Pos	Team	Pld	W	D	L	GF	GA	GD	Pts	Qualification
1	Moldova	3	2	1	0	12	2	+10	7	Advance to knockout phase
2	Portugal	3	1	1	1	2	5	−3	4	Advance to knockout phase
3	Albania	3	0	2	1	1	2	−1	2	Advance to knockout phase
4	Colombia	3	0	2	1	2	8	−6	2	

Source: International Socca Federation
4 June 2023
10:00

Moldova	7–1	Colombia
Stan 12', 24'; Lașcu 31'; Crîcimari 32'; Orbu 33'; Tonu 37'; Popescu 38'		Garzón 32'

4 June 2023
21:00

Portugal	1–0	Albania
Nogueira 38'

5 June 2023
13:00

Portugal	1–1	Colombia
Sow 8'		Ayala 34'

5 June 2023
19:00

Moldova	1–1	Albania
Plămădeală 40'		Reçi 14'

7 June 2023
09:00

Albania	0–0	Colombia

7 June 2023
14:00

Moldova	4–0	Portugal
Lașcu 8', 29'; Orbu 19'; Obadă 27'

=== Group G ===
Pos	Team	Pld	W	D	L	GF	GA	GD	Pts	Qualification
1	Belgium	3	3	0	0	22	3	+19	9	Advance to knockout phase
2	Greece	3	2	0	1	13	6	+7	6	Advance to knockout phase
3	Italy	3	1	0	2	5	12	−7	3	Advance to knockout phase
4	Saudi Arabia	3	0	0	3	3	22	−19	0	

Source: International Socca Federation
2 June 2023
22:00

Greece	4–1	Italy
Fouskas 13'; Chissos 28'; Kalamaridis 37'; Benechoutsos 42'		Bruno 41'

3 June 2023
13:00

Belgium	12–0	Saudi Arabia
Ghislandi 6', 18', 19', 37'; Lamsaiah 8', 12', 15', 27'; Napoleone 19'; Carello 23'; Akodad 30'; Winand 33'

4 June 2023
11:00

Belgium	6–1	Italy
Ghislandi 10', 39', 40'; Lamsaiah 13', 15'; Napoleone 36'		Bruno 4'

4 June 2023
12:00

Greece	7–1	Saudi Arabia
Fouskas 7'; Tushas 11', 22'; Giotis 17', 36'; Chissos 27'; Zelekou 32'		Al-Mutairi 34'

6 June 2023
14:00

Italy	3–2	Saudi Arabia
A. Gallinica 3'; Di Sanza 5'; G. Gallinica 22'		Al-Zayni 18'; Qabous 24'

6 June 2023
21:00

Greece	2–4	Belgium
Chissos 26'; Tushas 40'		Ghislandi 13', 21'; Napoleone 40'; Malengreaux 42'

=== Group H ===
Pos	Team	Pld	W	D	L	GF	GA	GD	Pts	Qualification
1	United States	3	3	0	0	12	1	+11	9	Advance to knockout phase
2	England	3	2	0	1	23	3	+20	6	Advance to knockout phase
3	Argentina	3	1	0	2	6	8	−2	3	Advance to knockout phase
4	Qatar	3	0	0	3	0	29	−29	0	

Source: International Socca Federation
3 June 2023
16:00

Argentina	6–0	Qatar
González 3', 4'; Senestrari 7', 36'; Crozzoli 12', 32'

3 June 2023
18:00

England	1–3	United States
Pires 28'		Garcia 20'; Rodriguez 23'; Lopez 36'

5 June 2023
10:00

England	18–0	Qatar
McDonald 2', 21', 37', 38'; Bham 5'; Pires 6', 8', 9'; Jung 8'; Perdomo 11', 25'; Muggeridge 14', 17'; Samuels 17'; Breeden 27'; Francis 29'; Husain 31'; Charlton 36'

5 June 2023
16:00

United States	4–0	Argentina
Garcia 19'; Pizano 25'; Garay 37'; Rojas 40'

7 June 2023
12:00

England	4–0	Argentina
Pires 5'; Bham 11'; McDonald 25', 29'

7 June 2023
15:00

United States	5–0	Qatar

=== Group I ===
Pos	Team	Pld	W	D	L	GF	GA	GD	Pts	Qualification
1	Poland	3	3	0	0	11	1	+10	9	Advance to knockout phase
2	Slovenia	3	1	1	1	4	4	0	4	Advance to knockout phase
3	Spain	3	1	0	2	3	6	−3	3	Advance to knockout phase
4	Uruguay	3	0	1	2	2	9	−7	1	

Source: International Socca Federation
3 June 2023
17:00

Spain	2–1	Uruguay
Helguera 9', 29'		Suárez 25'

4 June 2023
17:00

Poland	2–1	Slovenia
Elsner 33'; Dębicki 39'		Račič 40'

5 June 2023
09:00

Slovenia	1–1	Uruguay
Sodič 40'		Marichal 7'

7 June 2023
20:00

Poland	3–0	Spain
Dębicki 7'; Kucharski 29'; Mnochy 35'

6 June 2023
15:00

Slovenia	2–1	Spain
Sodič 11', 37'		Macià 8'

6 June 2023
18:00

Poland	6–0	Uruguay
Łepski 3'; Dębicki 12'; Kucharski 24'; Abramowicz 31'; Górka 32'; Januszewski 36'

=== Group J ===
Pos	Team	Pld	W	D	L	GF	GA	GD	Pts	Qualification
1	Lithuania	3	3	0	0	17	4	+13	9	Advance to knockout phase
2	Romania	3	2	0	1	15	6	+9	6	Advance to knockout phase
3	Mauritius	3	1	0	2	4	12	−8	3	Advance to knockout phase
4	Peru	3	0	0	3	3	17	−14	0	

Source: International Socca Federation
3 June 2023
20:00

Romania	9–1	Peru
Petrila 7', 26'; Fernando 11', 38'; Chiriac 12'; Dudău 19'; Vitan 31', 36'; Rareş 40'		Yupton 29'

4 June 2023
18:00

Lithuania	8–0	Mauritius
Tubutis 9'; Zagurskas 10'; Buzevičius 12'; Raštutis 31'; Kasparas 31'; Linauskas 35'; Masenzovas 36'; Radžiukynas 37'

5 June 2023
11:00

Romania	4–2	Mauritius
Iordan 3'; Crișan 17'; Mustafa 23' (o.g.); Dudău 34'		Mustafa 5'; Cadersa 31'

5 June 2023
12:00

Lithuania	6–2	Peru
Trinkūnas 1', 22'; Masenzovas 5'; Levonauskas 13', 38'; Tubutis 16'		Cruz 10'; Yupton 40'

6 June 2023
09:00

Mauritius	2–0	Peru
Speville 11'; Cadersa 23'

7 June 2023
13:00

Romania	2–3	Lithuania
Dudău 10'; Raul 11'		Trinkūnas 33'; Buzevičius 37'; Raštutis 40'

=== Group K ===
Pos	Team	Pld	W	D	L	GF	GA	GD	Pts	Qualification
1	Morocco	3	2	1	0	12	5	+7	7	Advance to knockout phase
2	Georgia	3	2	1	0	9	3	+6	7	Advance to knockout phase
3	Scotland	3	1	0	2	10	13	−3	3	Advance to knockout phase
4	Ireland	3	0	0	3	6	16	−10	0	

Source: International Socca Federation
3 June 2023
22:00

Scotland	2–7	Morocco
Kirkpatrick 22', 40'		Zouitni 8'; Benlaadem 13', 20'; Zouhri 33'; Bahrouji 34'; Ahouaoui 35'; El-Yaacoubi 38'

4 June 2023
16:00

Georgia	5–1	Ireland
Kiknadze 3'; Jaliashvili 24', 35'; Makaradze 29'; Gongadze 40'		Da Silva Bastos 37'

5 June 2023
14:00

Morocco	4–2	Ireland
El-Yaacoubi 3'; Belkas 30'; Ahouaoui 39'; Zouitni 41'		Ryan 5'; Watkin 40'

6 June 2023
11:00

Scotland	1–3	Georgia
McLachlan 36'		McLachlan 3' (o.g.); Jaliashvili 8', 33'

7 June 2023
10:00

Scotland	7–3	Ireland
Anderson 11', 22'; Kirkpatrick 14', 20', 23', 35'; Eadie 27'		Power 2'; Da Silva Bastos 6'; Watkin 27'

7 June 2023
19:00

Georgia	1–1	Morocco
Taoufik 9' (o.g.)		Totadze 5' (o.g.)

== Knockout phase ==
=== Bracket ===
Round of 32
China	2
Argentina	1
Hungary	2 (0)
Slovenia	2 (2)
Germany	7
Mauritius	0
Croatia	1
Georgia	0
Poland	6
Scotland	1
Brazil	3
Italy	0
Ukraine	3
Albania	1
Morocco	0 (1)
Oman	0 (0)
Mexico	6
Spain	0
France	3
Romania	0
Portugal	0
Greece	2
Egypt	4
England	0
Moldova	0 (1)
Kazakhstan	0 (3)
Lithuania	2 (1)
Cyprus	2 (2)
Belgium	3
Turkey	2
United States	2
Latvia	0

Round of 16
China	1
Slovenia	2
Germany	2 (0)
Croatia	2 (2)
Poland	1 (0)
Brazil	1 (2)
Ukraine	3
Morocco	1
Mexico	2 (3)
France	2 (2)
Greece	2
Egypt	0
Kazakhstan	2
Cyprus	1
Belgium	2
United States	3

Quarterfinals
Slovenia	0
Croatia	1
Brazil	1 (0)
Ukraine	1 (2)
Mexico	4
Greece	1
Kazakhstan	1 (2)
United States	1 (1)

Semifinals
Croatia	0
Ukraine	1
Mexico	2 (4)
Kazakhstan	2 (5)

Final
Ukraine	2 (1)
Kazakhstan	2 (2)
Third place
Croatia	0
Mexico	2

=== Round of 32 ===
8 June 2023
13:00

China	2–1	Argentina
Feng 19'; Wu 37'		González 12'

8 June 2023
14:05

Hungary	2–2	Slovenia
Bognár 8'; Hollauer 20'		Potočnik 10'; Sodič 34'
Penalties
Bognár (penalty missed); Sulyok (penalty missed)	0–2	Sodič (penalty missed); Račič (penalty scored); Malivojević (penalty scored)

8 June 2023
15:10

Poland	6–1	Scotland
Kucharski 5', 16'; Elsner 10', 14'; Dregier 20'; Januszewski 24'		Andrew 25'

8 June 2023
16:15

Brazil	3–0	Italy
Gomes 5'; Ferreira 18'; de Jesus 20'

8 June 2023
17:20

Croatia	1–0	Georgia
Haluška 36'

8 June 2023
18:25

Morocco	0–0	Oman
Penalties
Zouhri (penalty missed); Ahouaoui (penalty missed); Zouitni (penalty scored)	1–0	Al-Alawi (penalty missed); Al-Maharmi (penalty missed); Al-Harthi (penalty missed)

8 June 2023
19:45

Germany	7–0	Mauritius
Kühle 5'; Seinsche 11', 37'; Chandra 17'; Mediavilla 20'; Evers 24'; Benfarji 39'

8 June 2023
21:15

Ukraine	3–1	Albania
Melnik 7'; Sandetskyi 12'; Khrul 40'		Kaca 32'

9 June 2023
09:00

Mexico	6–0	Spain
Fierros 3', 27'; Martínez 24'; Damián 25', 36'; Alcaraz 39'

9 June 2023
10:05

France	3–0	Romania
Jastier 28'; Manias 39', 40'

9 June 2023
11:10

Portugal	0–2	Greece
		Fouskas 30'; Zelekou 36'

9 June 2023
12:15

Egypt	4–0	England
Abdalla 15', 23'; Aziz 31'; Abdelrahman 37'

9 June 2023
13:20

Moldova	0–0	Kazakhstan
Penalties
Plămădeală (penalty missed); Obadă (penalty scored)	1–3	Avutov (penalty scored); Kazak (penalty scored); Pishkar (penalty scored)

9 June 2023
14:25

Lithuania	2–2	Cyprus
Linauskas 20'; Raštutis 44'		Nikolaidis 22'; Iosif 26'
Penalties
Zagurskas (penalty scored); Trinkūnas (penalty missed); Raštutis (penalty missed)	1–2	Tsitsos (penalty scored); Nikolaidis (penalty scored)

9 June 2023
15:30

Belgium	3–2	Turkey
Ghislandi 19'; Akodad 25'; Akrouh 40'		Ayaz 9'; Bozlar 32'

9 June 2023
16:35

United States	2–0	Latvia
Barrios 11'; Garcia 40'

=== Round of 16 ===
9 June 2023
17:40

Poland	1–1	Brazil
Gregorowicz 19'		Santos 33'
Penalties
Łuczak (penalty missed); Elsner (penalty missed)	0–2	Silva (penalty scored); Neiva (penalty scored)

9 June 2023
18:45

Ukraine	3–1	Morocco
Kolesnykov 18'; Sandetskyi 30'; Shaidiuk 41'		Bahrouji 40'

9 June 2023
19:50

China	1–2	Slovenia
Feng 41'		Sodič 39'; Preskar 42'

9 June 2023
20:55

Germany	2–2	Croatia
Benfarji 7'; Evers 23'		Ljubas 6'; Karamarković 25'
Penalties
Kühle (penalty missed); Chandra (penalty missed)	0–2	Romić (penalty scored); Haramustek (penalty missed); Vidićek (penalty scored)

10 June 2023
10:00

Mexico	2–2	France
Anguiano 20'; Damián 29'		Rozier 17', 40'
Penalties
Damián (penalty missed); Fierros (penalty scored); Alcaraz (penalty scored); Martínez (penalty scored)	3–2	Jastier (penalty missed); Labaig (penalty scored); Manias (penalty scored); Rozier (penalty missed)

10 June 2023
11:05

Greece	2–0	Egypt
Mourtzakis 25'; Tushas 28'

10 June 2023
12:10

Kazakhstan	2–1	Cyprus
Abdrakhmanov 19'; Yelemessov 24'		Iosif 12'

10 June 2023
13:15

Belgium	2–3	United States
Ghislandi 10', 11'		Rebolledo 20'; Garay 34'; Garcia 38'

=== Quarterfinals ===
10 June 2023
16:15

Slovenia	0–1	Croatia
		Ljubas 19'

10 June 2023
17:30

Brazil	1–1	Ukraine
Viana 12'		Melnik 20'
Penalties
Silva (penalty missed); Neiva (penalty missed)	0–2	Kolesnykov (penalty scored); Tsopa (penalty scored)

10 June 2023
18:45

Mexico	4–1	Greece
Alcaraz 6', 24'; Damián 10'; Fierros 31'		Chissos 27'

10 June 2023
20:00

Kazakhstan	1–1	United States
Avutov 12'		Lopez 30'
Penalties
Avutov (penalty scored); Kazak (penalty missed); Pishkar (penalty missed); Nurgaziyev (penalty missed); Yeskeldi (penalty scored)	2–1	Pizano (penalty scored); Garcia (penalty missed); Cervantes (penalty missed); Garay (penalty missed); Rojas (penalty missed)

=== Semifinals ===
11 June 2023
11:00

Croatia	0–1	Ukraine
		Kodatskyi 20'

11 June 2023
12:15

Mexico	2–2	Kazakhstan
Damián 3'; Gutiérrez 21'		Murzabekov 22'; Nurgaziyev 26'
Penalties
Anguiano (penalty missed); Martínez (penalty missed); Alcaraz (penalty scored); de Jesús (penalty scored); R. Hernández (penalty scored); Guzmán (penalty scored); Alcaraz (penalty missed); R. Hernández (penalty missed)	4–5	Avutov (penalty missed); Nurgaziyev (penalty scored); Yeskeldi (penalty missed); Taibassarov (penalty scored); Pishkar (penalty scored); Yeskeldi (penalty scored); Pishkar (penalty missed); Nurgaziyev (penalty scored)

=== Third place ===
11 June 2023
18:00

Croatia	0–2	Mexico
		Gutiérrez 10'; Damián 31'

=== Final ===
11 June 2023
20:00

Ukraine	2–2	Kazakhstan
Melnik 18', 37'		Yelemessov 10'; Murzabekov 14'
Penalties
Kolesnykov (penalty missed); Khrul (penalty scored); Tsopa (penalty missed); Sandetskyi (penalty missed)	1–2	Avutov (penalty missed); Nurgaziyev (penalty missed); Yeskeldi (penalty scored); Pishkar (penalty scored)
