= Błażej Telichowski =

Polish footballer

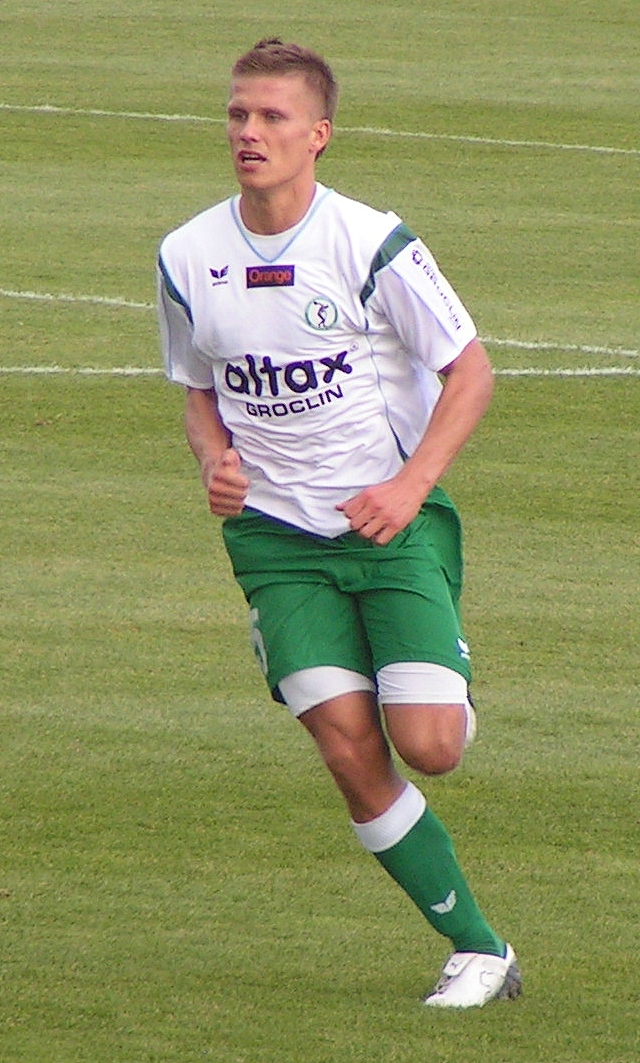
- Telichowski playing for Dyskobolia Grodzisk Wielkopolski

Personal information
- Full name: Błażej Telichowski
- Date of birth: 4 June 1984 (age 42)
- Place of birth: Nowy Tomyśl, Poland
- Height: 1.87 m (6 ft 2 in)
- Positions: Defender; striker

Youth career
- 1994–2001: Polonia Nowy Tomyśl

Senior career*
Years	Team	Apps	(Gls)
2001–2006	Lech Poznań	45	(5)
2006–2008	Dyskobolia Grodzisk Wielkopolski	26	(2)
2008–2010	Polonia Warsaw	11	(0)
2009	→ Arka Gdynia (loan)	9	(0)
2010–2011	Polonia Bytom	22	(5)
2011–2012	Zagłębie Lubin	7	(0)
2012–2013	Górnik Zabrze	4	(1)
2013–2014	Podbeskidzie Bielsko-Biała	40	(3)
2014–2015	GKS Bełchatów	28	(0)
2015–2017	Miedź Legnica	18	(2)
2017–2021	Tarnovia Tarnowo Podgórne	56	(23)
2021	→ Wiara Lecha Poznań (loan)	12	(4)
2021–2024	Wiara Lecha Poznań	53	(20)
Total		331	(65)

International career
2005–2006	Poland U21	6	(1)
- * Club domestic league appearances and goals

Błażej Telichowski (born 6 June 1984) is a Polish former professional footballer. Mainly deployed as a defender, he switched to a forward position in the final years of his career.

== Club career ==
He started his professional career with Lech Poznań.

In May 2011, he joined Zagłębie Lubin on a two-year contract.

== International career ==
Telichowski was also a member of Poland U21 team.

== Honours ==
Lech Poznań

- Polish Cup: 2003–04
- Polish Super Cup: 2004

Dyskobolia Grodzisk Wielkopolski

- Polish Cup: 2006–07
- Ekstraklasa Cup: 2006–07, 2007–08

Wiara Lecha Poznań

- V liga Greater Poland, group II: 2022–23

Poland (socca)

- Socca EuroCup: 2025
