= Petru Popescu (footballer) =

Moldovan footballer (born 2001)

Personal information
- Date of birth: 1 March 2002 (age 24)
- Place of birth: Chișinău, Moldova
- Height: 1.89 m (6 ft 2 in)
- Position: Forward

Team information
- Current team: Petrocub Hîncești
- Number: 15

Youth career
- –2018: CSCT Buiucani
- 2018–2019: Lokomotiv Moscow

Senior career*
Years	Team	Apps	(Gls)
2020–2022	Olimp-Dolgoprudny	9	(1)
2021–2022	Olimp-Dolgoprudny-2	8	(0)
2024–2025	Victoria Chișinău	12	(5)
2025–	Petrocub Hîncești	52	(24)

International career^{‡}
2018–2019	Moldova U17	5	(1)
2026–	Moldova	10	(4)
- * Club domestic league appearances and goals as of 18 November 2026 ‡ National team caps and goals as of 17 November 2026

Petru Popescu (born 1 March 2002) is a Moldovan professional footballer who plays as a midfielder for Moldovan Liga club Petrocub Hîncești and the Moldova national team.

== Club career ==
Popescu signed his first professional contract in 2020 with FC Olimp-Dolgoprudny which played in the third tier in Russian football.

From 2022 to 2024, Popescu played in Amoliga, Moldova's national socca championship. He won the 2023–24 edition with Terebna.

In 2024, Popescu won Moldova's beach soccer supercup with BSC Nistru, which later participated in 2024 Euro Winners Cup. He was part of the 2024 shortlist for the best beach soccer player of the year.

In the same year, Popescu joined Liga 1 side FC Victoria Chișinău.

In March 2025, Popescu signed for FC Petrocub Hîncești. The next season he won the 2025–26 Moldovan Liga title and finished as the league's second-highest scorer, with 15 goals in 22 matches.

== International career ==
Popescu scored in his debut for Moldova U17 in 3–1 loss against Bulgaria U17 in October 2018. He also played in the 2019 European qualifiers.

Popescu played for Moldova's national socca team, participating in 2023 Socca World Cup and 2024 Socca EuroCup.

In 2024, Popescu played for Moldova national beach soccer team in 2024 Euro Beach Soccer League.

Popescu made his debut for the senior team in a 2–0 friendly loss to Lithuania on 26 March 2026. Four days later he scored his first goal for Moldova in a 3–2 friendly loss against Cyprus.

== Career statistics ==
As of 18 November 2026

Appearances and goals by club, season and competition
Club	Season	League			Cup		Europe		Other		Total	
Club	Season	Division	Apps	Goals	Apps	Goals	Apps	Goals	Apps	Goals	Apps	Goals
Olimp-Dolgoprudny	2020–21	PFL	2	0	0	0	—		—		2	0
Olimp-Dolgoprudny	2021–22	FNL	7	1	0	0	—		—		7	1
Olimp-Dolgoprudny	Total		9	1	0	0	—		—		9	1
Olimp-Dolgoprudny 2	2021–22	PFL	8	0	0	0	—		—		8	0
Victoria Chișinău	2024–25	Liga 1	12	5	0	0	—		—		12	5
Petrocub Hîncești	2024–25	Moldovan Super Liga	8	3	1	1	—		—		9	4
Petrocub Hîncești	2025–26	Moldovan Super Liga	29	15	3	1	4	0	—		36	16
Petrocub Hîncești	2026–27	Moldovan Super Liga	15	6	1	1	4	2	—		20	9
Petrocub Hîncești	Total		52	24	5	3	8	2	—		65	29
Career total			81	30	5	3	8	2	—		94	35

=== International ===
As of match played on 16 November 2026

Appearances and goals by national team and year
National team	Year	Apps	Goals
Moldova	2026	10	4
Total		10	4

Scores and results list Moldova's goal tally first, score column indicates score after each Popescu goal.

List of international goals scored by Petru Popescu
No.	Date	Venue	Opponent	Score	Result	Competition
1	30 March 2026	GSP Stadium, Nicosia, Cyprus	Cyprus	1–3	2–3	Friendly
2	2 October 2026	Astana Arena, Astana, Kazakhstan	Kazakhstan	2–0	2–1	2026–27 UEFA Nations League
3	13 November 2026	Stadionul Zimbru, Chișinău, Moldova	Kazakhstan	1–0	2–1	2026–27 UEFA Nations League
4	13 November 2026	Stadionul Zimbru, Chișinău, Moldova	Kazakhstan	2–1	2–1	2026–27 UEFA Nations League

== Honours ==
Olimp-Dolgoprudny

- Russian Professional Football League: 2020–21

Petrocub Hîncești

- Moldovan Super Liga: 2025–26
