= Robert Janicki =

Polish footballer

Personal information
- Full name: Robert Janicki
- Date of birth: 7 June 1997 (age 29)
- Place of birth: Poznań, Poland
- Height: 1.70 m (5 ft 7 in)
- Position: Midfielder

Team information
- Current team: Odlew Poznań
- Number: 10

Youth career
- –2014: Lech Poznań

Senior career*
Years	Team	Apps	(Gls)
2014–2015	Lech Poznań II	1	(0)
2015–2017	Hoffenheim	0	(0)
2016	Hoffenheim II	1	(0)
2017	Pogoń Siedlce	8	(0)
2017	Olimpia Grudziądz	5	(0)
2018–2021	Warta Poznań	96	(16)
2021–2022	Sandecja Nowy Sącz	21	(0)
2022–2023	Chojniczanka Chojnice	10	(1)
2023–2024	Wisła Puławy	39	(2)
2024	Warta Gorzów Wielkopolski	6	(0)
2026–	Odlew Poznań	12	(11)

International career
2015–2016	Poland U19	9	(1)
2016–2017	Poland U20	8	(0)
- * Club domestic league appearances and goals as of 11:05, 6 October 2026 (UTC)

Robert Janicki (born 7 June 1997) is a Polish professional footballer who plays as a midfielder for Odlew Poznań. Besides Poland, he has played in Germany.
