= 2025 Socca World Cup =

Socca competition

- Location: Cancún, Mexico
- Dates: 29 November–7 December 2025
- Nations: 32

Medalists
gold medal	Poland
silver medal	Mexico
bronze medal	Kazakhstan

The 2025 Socca World Cup was a tournament held from 29 November to 7 December 2025 in Cancún, Mexico. The official draw was held on 18 November 2025. The ceremony was delayed to this date from an earlier one due to some countries having visa issues.

== Group stage ==
=== Group A ===
Pos	Team	Pld	W	D	L	GF	GA	GD	Pts	Qualification
1	Mexico (H)	3	3	0	0	12	2	+10	9	Knockout stage
2	Australia	3	2	0	1	5	8	−3	6	Knockout stage
3	Ireland	3	0	1	2	4	6	−2	1	
4	Belgium	3	0	1	2	4	9	−5	1	

First match(es) will be played: 29 Nov 2025. Source:
Rules for classification: Group stage tiebreakers
(H) Hosts
29 November 2025
20:00 UTC−5

Mexico	3–0	Belgium
Garcia 13'; Aguirre 33', 34'

30 November 2025
13:00 UTC−5

Ireland	0–1	Australia
		De Silva 40+2'

1 December 2025
20:00 UTC−5

Australia	1–7	Mexico
Adeli 26'		Madgaleno 1', 18', 40+1'; Aguirre 8'; Parres 25'; Mercado 27'; Garcia 29'

2 December 2025
18:00 UTC−5

Belgium	3–3	Ireland
Cojocaru 20'; Azzagari 29'; Vercauteren 40+1'		Watkin 13', 39'; Mimnagh 31'

3 December 2025
09:00 UTC−5

Belgium	1–3	Australia
Vercauteren 27'		Adeli 1'; Young 28'; Guest 36'

3 December 2025
20:00 UTC−5

Mexico	2–1	Ireland
Mercado 7'; Volante 35'		Heelan 32'

=== Group B ===
Pos	Team	Pld	W	D	L	GF	GA	GD	Pts	Qualification
1	Czech Republic	3	3	0	0	12	3	+9	9	Knockout stage
2	Greece	3	2	0	1	6	5	+1	6	Knockout stage
3	United States	3	1	0	2	7	12	−5	3	
4	Serbia	3	0	0	3	4	9	−5	0	

First match(es) will be played: 30 Nov 2025. Source:
Rules for classification: Group stage tiebreakers
30 November 2025
12:00 UTC−5

Serbia	2–3	Czech Republic
Damjanović 28'; Perendija 40'		Hrdina 7', 25'; Panteleichuk 21'

30 November 2025
16:00 UTC−5

Greece	4–2	United States
Papadopoulos 5', 14'; Tusha 16', 33'		Ceja 33'; Bitton 40+1'

1 December 2025
17:00 UTC−5

Greece	2–1	Serbia
Bampoulakis 40'; Papadopoulos 40+1'		Perendija 40+2'

1 December 2025
22:00 UTC−5

United States	1–7	Czech Republic
Chandler 23'		Divis 2', 17', 22', 28'; Nečas 31'; Panyrek 33'; Marek 40'

3 December 2025
10:00 UTC−5

United States	4–1	Serbia
Chandler 10'; Garcia-Lopez 17', 24', 40+1'		Damjanović 4'

4 December 2025
18:00 UTC−5

Czech Republic	2–0	Greece
Hrdina 7'; Divis 11'

=== Group C ===
Pos	Team	Pld	W	D	L	GF	GA	GD	Pts	Qualification
1	Bulgaria	3	3	0	0	12	3	+9	9	Knockout stage
2	Oman	3	2	0	1	9	5	+4	6	Knockout stage
3	Canada	3	1	0	2	13	9	+4	3	
4	Haiti	3	0	0	3	5	22	−17	0	

First match(es) will be played: 1 Dec 2025. Source:
Rules for classification: Group stage tiebreakers
1 December 2025
08:00 UTC−5

Oman	0–1	Bulgaria
		Aleksov 5'

1 December 2025
09:00 UTC−5

Canada	10–1	Haiti
Tesfaye 10', 23', 38'; Balbinotti 11'; Ouaamar 18', 37'; Živković 22', 34', 35'; Foley 29'		Galety 4'

2 December 2025
17:00 UTC−5

Bulgaria	7–2	Haiti
Tomchev 5'; Petrov 9', 28'; Fotirov 11'; Stefanov 13'; Iliev 24'; Aleksov 26'		Calixte 10', 32'

2 December 2025
22:00 UTC−5

Oman	4–2	Canada
Alwahaibi 5', 40+3'; Alrawahi 24'; Alsiyabi 39'		Assaf 10', 30'

3 December 2025
17:00 UTC−5

Haiti	2–5	Oman
Calixte 25', 28'		Alwahaibi 13'; Alsiyabi 14'; Alaraimi 15'; Albalushi 20+2'; Bahajaj 30'

4 December 2025
17:00 UTC−5

Bulgaria	4–1	Canada
Tomchev 5', 11'; Petrov 16', 30'		Ouaamar 31'

=== Group D ===
Pos	Team	Pld	W	D	L	GF	GA	GD	Pts	Qualification
1	Poland	3	3	0	0	18	4	+14	9	Knockout stage
2	Argentina	3	1	1	1	4	6	−2	4	Knockout stage
3	Latvia	3	0	2	1	5	9	−4	2	
4	Paraguay	3	0	1	2	6	14	−8	1	

First match(es) will be played: 30 Nov 2025. Source:
Rules for classification: Group stage tiebreakers
30 November 2025
15:00 UTC−5

Poland	6–2	Latvia
Jaszczak 7', 40'; Elsner 14'; Dębicki 15'; Zaręba 19', 25'		Korsaks 23'; Strauss 37'

30 November 2025
21:00 UTC−5

Argentina	3–2	Paraguay
Malizia 14', 40'; Goye 27'		Samudio 37'; Busto 40'

1 December 2025
19:00 UTC−5

Poland	4–1	Argentina
Piórkowski 8'; Kucharski 10'; Jaszczak 20', 40+1'		Malizia 4'

2 December 2025
09:00 UTC−5

Latvia	3–3	Paraguay
Korsaks 6', 40+3'; Stabulnieks 8'		Lezcano 8'; Brun 19'; Busto 40+1'

4 December 2025
09:00 UTC−5

Latvia	0–0	Argentina

4 December 2025
21:00 UTC−5

Paraguay	1–8	Poland
Brun 21'		Bienias 12'; Linca 14'; Dębicki 16', 24'; Nowacki 20'; Kucharski 22'; Piórkowski 38'; Jaszczak 38'

=== Group E ===
Pos	Team	Pld	W	D	L	GF	GA	GD	Pts	Qualification
1	Romania	3	3	0	0	15	1	+14	9	Knockout stage
2	Costa Rica	3	2	0	1	8	7	+1	6	Knockout stage
3	Chile	3	1	0	2	7	5	+2	3	
4	England	3	0	0	3	1	18	−17	0	

First match(es) will be played: 30 Nov 2025. Source:
Rules for classification: Group stage tiebreakers
30 November 2025
18:00 UTC−5

Chile	1–3	Costa Rica
Unknown 33'		M. Jimenez 13'; Jara 24'; S. Jimenez 29'

1 December 2025
10:00 UTC−5

Romania	7–1	England
Bobe 11', 13'; Dobrea 13'; Burciu 17'; Panzaru 20'; Tiron 23'; Buda 25'		Adry 40+1'

2 December 2025
10:00 UTC−5

Romania	2–0	Chile
Asăvoaei 5'; Bobe 33'

2 December 2025
21:00 UTC−5

England	4–2 (Match given by default to Costa Rica)	Costa Rica
John 2', 11'; Mary 15', 32'		Jimenez 20+1'; Granados 29'

3 December 2025
21:00 UTC−5

England	0–6	Chile
		Alcaino 13', 31'; Correa 16'; De La Carrera 17'; Silva 30'; Coria 36'

4 December 2025
22:00 UTC−5

Costa Rica	0–6	Romania
		Asăvoaei 6'; Vitan 8', 9'; Halas 21'; Burciu 40'; Buda 40+1'

=== Group F ===
Pos	Team	Pld	W	D	L	GF	GA	GD	Pts	Qualification
1	Netherlands	3	2	1	0	10	7	+3	7	Knockout stage
2	Kazakhstan	3	1	2	0	7	4	+3	5	Knockout stage
3	France	3	1	1	1	7	7	0	4	
4	Uruguay	3	0	0	3	3	9	−6	0	

First match(es) will be played: 30 Nov 2025. Source:
Rules for classification: Group stage tiebreakers
30 November 2025
19:00 UTC−5

Kazakhstan	1–1	France
Begalin 34'		Asselineau 37'

30 November 2025
20:00 UTC−5

Uruguay	1–3	Netherlands
Gomez 37'		Bouhalhoul 23', 39'; Youssef 40'

2 December 2025
20:00 UTC−5

France	4–5	Netherlands
Colacicco 19'; Garcia 37'; Huertos 38'; Asselineau 39'		El Boubsi 8'; Dahmani 13'; Biseswar 32', 36'

3 December 2025
08:00 UTC−5

Kazakhstan	4–1	Uruguay
Begalin 10', 40+1'; Berdibek 18'; Adilov 28'		Rodriguez 4'

4 December 2025
10:00 UTC−5

Netherlands	2–2	Kazakhstan
Biseswar 28'; Karim 35'		Begalin 15'; Berdibek 18'

4 December 2025
20:00 UTC−5

France	2–1	Uruguay
Colacicco 17'; Verplanck 40+5'		Taberne 1'

=== Group G ===
Pos	Team	Pld	W	D	L	GF	GA	GD	Pts	Qualification
1	Ukraine	3	3	0	0	15	2	+13	9	Knockout stage
2	Germany	3	1	0	2	9	7	+2	3	Knockout stage
3	Spain	3	1	0	2	5	10	−5	3	
4	Colombia	3	1	0	2	4	14	−10	3	

First match(es) will be played: 29 Nov 2025. Source:
Rules for classification: Group stage tiebreakers
29 November 2025
22:00 UTC−5

Spain	1–2	Colombia
Villalba 38'		Marulanda 23'; Muñoz 31'

30 November 2025
17:00 UTC−5

Germany	0–3	Ukraine
		Poslavskyi 9'; Hybalo 29'; Hrebeniuk 34'

2 December 2025
08:00 UTC−5

Ukraine	6–1	Colombia
Lystopad 5', 16'; Hrebeniuk 7', 20'; Goskoderya 38'; Siryi 40'		Marulanda 25'

2 December 2025
19:00 UTC−5

Germany	2–3	Spain
Yılmaz 13'; Fries 36'		Galan 26'; Villalba 28'; Otermin 40+9'

3 December 2025
18:00 UTC−5

Ukraine	6–1	Spain
Lystopad 21'; Hrebeniuk 27'; Kuzmak 29'; Goskoderya 39'; Maksymets 40+1'		Sanz 37'

3 December 2025
19:00 UTC−5

Colombia	1–7	Germany
Valencia 28'		Torrez 5' (o.g.); Haitz 8', 20+1'; Yılmaz 13'; Metidji 22'; Fries 29'; Cekić 34'

=== Group H ===
Pos	Team	Pld	W	D	L	GF	GA	GD	Pts	Qualification
1	Hungary	3	3	0	0	16	0	+16	9	Knockout stage
2	Honduras	3	1	1	1	6	5	+1	4	Knockout stage
3	Brazil	3	1	1	1	6	13	−7	4	
4	Morocco	3	0	0	3	1	11	−10	0	

First match(es) will be played: 29 Nov 2025. Source:
Rules for classification: Group stage tiebreakers
29 November 2025
21:00 UTC−5

Brazil	0–10	Hungary
		Tolnay 14'; Fekete 15', 32', 38', 39'; Filkor 17'; M. Szabó 19', 29'; Beliczky 25'; D. Szabó 28'

30 November 2025
14:00 UTC−5

Morocco	1–3	Honduras
Abouallal 14'		Alvarez 8'; Canales 26'; Gutierrez 39'

1 December 2025
18:00 UTC−5

Hungary	1–0	Honduras
B. Szabo 20'

1 December 2025
21:00 UTC−5

Brazil	3–0	Morocco
Silvera 37'; Oliveira 38'; Laghjibi 40+3' (o.g.)

3 December 2025
22:00 UTC−5

Hungary	5–0	Morocco
Filkor 2', 20'; Tolnay 5'; M. Szabó 12', 40'		Laghjibi (red card) 37'

4 December 2025
19:00 UTC−5

Honduras	3–3	Brazil
Canales 5', 12', 38'		Oliveira 10', 40+3'; Purificação 29'

== Knockout phase ==
=== Bracket ===
Round of 16
Mexico	1 (2)
Greece	1 (1)
Bulgaria	3
Argentina	2
Romania	1 (1)
Kazakhstan	1 (2)
Ukraine	5
Honduras	0
Czech Republic	3
Australia	1
Poland	2
Oman	1
Netherlands	6
Costa Rica	3
Hungary	1 (1)
Germany	1 (2)

Quarterfinals
Mexico	4
Bulgaria	2
Kazakhstan	1 (2)
Ukraine	1 (1)
Czech Republic	2
Poland	4
Netherlands	3
Germany	1

Semifinals
Mexico	5
Kazakhstan	0
Poland	2
Netherlands	1

Final
Mexico	1
Poland	3
Third place
Kazakhstan	3
Netherlands	1

=== Round of 16 ===
5 December 2025
15:00

Mexico	1–1	Greece
Madgaleno 19'		Fouskas 31'
Penalties
Parres (penalty missed); Morales (penalty missed); Rivera (penalty scored); Garcia (penalty scored)	2–1	Fouskas (penalty scored); Mourtzakis (penalty missed); Chatzis (penalty missed); Papadopoulos (penalty missed)

5 December 2025
16:05

Bulgaria	3–2	Argentina
Aleksov 12', 14', 33'		Malizia 5', 38'

5 December 2025
17:10

Romania	1–1	Kazakhstan
Vincene 9'; Samoila (red card) 40'		Yeskeldi 38'
Penalties
Dobrea (penalty missed); Bobe (penalty missed); Vitan (penalty scored)	1–2	Avutov (penalty scored); Yeskeldi (penalty missed); Pishkar (penalty scored)

5 December 2025
18:15

Ukraine	5–0	Honduras

Note: Honduras did not show up to the match due to financial constraints, so the game was awarded 5-0 to Ukraine.

5 December 2025
19:20

Czech Republic	3–1	Australia
Zelenka 34'; Kodatskyi 36'; Divis 40'		De Silva 30'

5 December 2025
21:10

Poland	2–1	Oman
Dębicki 22'; Zaręba 27'		Alwahaibi 20+4' (pen.)

5 December 2025
21:30

Netherlands	6–3	Costa Rica
El Boubsi 8', 14', 32'; Biseswar 10'; Bouzit 14'; Ait Soussan 18'		S. Jimenez 13'; M. Jimenez 23', 32'

5 December 2025
22:35

Hungary	1–1	Germany
Fekete 2'		Haitz 8'
Penalties
Fekete (penalty scored)	1–2	Cekić (penalty scored); Fries (penalty scored)

=== Quarterfinals ===
7 December 2025
0:15

Kazakhstan	1–1	Ukraine
Yeskeldi 37'		Khrul 22'
Penalties
Begalin (penalty scored); Pishkar (penalty scored)	2–1	Smolovyk (penalty scored)

7 December 2025
1:20

Czech Republic	2–4	Poland
Divis 23', 33' (red card) 40+2'		Dębicki 6', 20+1'; Jaszczak 37'; Kucharski 40'

7 December 2025
2:25

Mexico	4–2	Bulgaria
Aguirre 12'; Parres 29'; Morales 33'; Volante 40+2'		Spasov 9'; Fotirov 39'

7 December 2025
3:30

Netherlands	3–1	Germany
Biseswar 19'; Bouhalhoul 38'; Bouzit 39'		Cekić 27'

=== Semifinals ===
7 December 2025
10:00

Mexico	5–0	Kazakhstan
Aguirre 6'; Garcia 11'; Gutierrez 32'; Hernandez 34' (red card) 40+5'; Gonzalez 40'		Begalin (red card) 40+5'

7 December 2025
11:15

Poland	2–1	Netherlands
Bienias 22'; Nowakowski 40+2'		El Boubsi 20+1'

=== Third place ===
7 December 2025
18:00

Kazakhstan	3–1	Netherlands
Yelemessov 6', 17'; Avutov 7'		Dahmani 1'

=== Final ===
7 December 2025
20:00

Mexico	1–3	Poland
Mercado 19'		Jaszczak 33', 34'; Linca 38'
