= Jarosław Araszkiewicz =

Polish footballer (born 1965)

Personal information
- Date of birth: 1 February 1965 (age 61)
- Place of birth: Szamotuły, Poland
- Height: 1.78 m (5 ft 10 in)
- Position: Midfielder

Team information
- Current team: Wiara Lecha Poznań (youth coach)

Senior career*
Years	Team	Apps	(Gls)
1980–1985	Lech Poznań	39	(5)
1985–1986	Legia Warsaw	41	(2)
1987–1990	Lech Poznań	86	(20)
1990–1991	Bakırköyspor	50	(20)
1992	Lech Poznań	19	(6)
1993	MSV Duisburg	10	(1)
1993	Lech Poznań	5	(0)
1994	VfL Herzlake	7	(0)
1994	Pogoń Szczecin	14	(3)
1995	Maccabi Netanya	14	(3)
1995–1996	Hakoah Ramat Gan		
1996–1997	Dyskobolia Grodzisk	15	(3)
1998	Lech Poznań	26	(9)
1999	Aluminium Konin	5	(0)
2000–2001	Dyskobolia Grodzisk	46	(5)
2002–2003	Lech Poznań	13	(2)

International career
1985–1992	Poland	12	(0)

Managerial career
- 2003–2004: Lech Poznań II
- 2004–2007: Warta Poznań
- 2007–2008: Sandecja Nowy Sącz
- 2008–2009: Pelikan Łowicz
- 2009–2010: Kolejarz Stróże
- 2010–2011: Wisła Płock
- 2011: Olimpia Elbląg
- 2011–2012: Warta Poznań
- 2012: Sandecja Nowy Sącz
- 2013: Jarota Jarocin
- 2014: Luboński KS
- 2015–2016: Unia Swarzędz
- 2016: Sokół Kleczew
- 2016: Zagłębie Sosnowiec
- 2021–: Wiara Lecha Poznań (youth)
- 2025: Wiara Lecha Poznań
- * Club domestic league appearances and goals

Jarosław Piotr Araszkiewicz (born 1 February 1965) is a Polish professional football manager and former player who currently works as a youth coach for IV liga Greater Poland club Wiara Lecha Poznań.

== Career ==
=== Club ===
He played as a striker or winger. He can be called football nomad as he had changed clubs 15 times during the course of his career. He played for such clubs as: Legia Warsaw, MSV Duisburg, Dyskobolia Grodzisk, but he is best known as an icon of Lech Poznań. Araszkiewicz won five league titles with Lech, five out of nine that Lech won in its history. Araszkiewicz also won the Polish Cup with Lech twice. He began his professional career in Lech and returned later to Poznań. He played 176 matches and scored 40 goals for Lech.

=== National team ===
He played 12 times for Poland.

== Managerial career ==
After retiring from the playing career he was still linked to Poznań and the surrounding area, he managed many local teams as well as those connected with Lech.

== Honours ==
Lech Poznań

- Ekstraklasa: 1982–83, 1983–84, 1989–90, 1991–92, 1992–93
- I liga: 2001–02
- Polish Cup: 1983–84, 1987–88

Individual

- Lech Poznań All-time XI
