= International Socca Federation =

Event Organizer of six-aside football

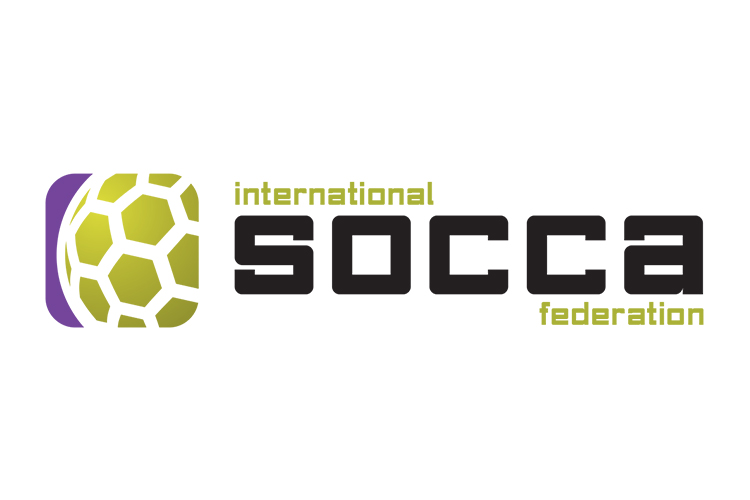
- Abbreviation: ISF
- Formation: 2017; 9 years ago
- Founded at: Birmingham, England, United Kingdom
- Headquarters: Birmingham
- Region served: Worldwide
- Official language: English
- President: Christoph Koechy
- Affiliations: TUI Group
- Website: soccafederation.com

The International Socca Federation (ISF) is an event organizer of small-sided football, often referred to as Socca, and abbreviated to ISF. The ISF organises Socca World Cup's, European Championships, Socca Champions League's, and Socca Copa America's, all which differ in format. ISF unlike their name suggest is not a Federation and provides no Federation level membership. For either, 5-, 6-, 7- or 8-a-side tournaments for professional national and club teams.

== History ==
=== Formation ===
The ISF was formed in late 2017 and was launched at a ceremony in Birmingham in February 2018, with guests of honour including World Cup and EURO referee Mark Clattenburg. 51 countries invited to the launch.

Eligibility criteria for countries to host a tournament are for official ISF Members, who at least have a silver package ISF membership, paid via the ISF website.

=== Governance ===
The governance structure announced involves a number of top figures from within ISF. At the highest level is the President of the International Socca Federation. Former President David Leone stepped down in 2026 and majority stakes in the company were acquired by its Greek and German partners, with Christoph Koechy as the new President.

=== ISF Memberships ===
A country is not recognised as a member of ISF until the relevant 5-, 6-, or 7-a-side membership has been purchased and paid for in full. ISF membership is granted on a format-specific basis, with each format conferring exclusive rights to represent the country in ISF competitions for that discipline. ISF memberships operate on a fixed one-year term (1 January – 31 December) and are allocated on a first-come, first-served basis. Once a country’s membership for a specific discipline has been purchased for the membership year, no other organisation may represent that country, enter teams, or hold membership for the same discipline until the following membership year. Where a country’s membership has been purchased for one format only, any remaining formats that have not been purchased remain available and are not reserved or restricted.

=== Partners ===
In 2024, the International Socca Federation announced a multi-year global partnership with TUI Group, a multinational travel and tourism company. Under the agreement, TUI became the title sponsor of several ISF international tournaments and is represented across a number of ISF events annually. The partnership forms part of TUI’s broader sports sponsorship strategy and includes the development of travel packages linked to selected socca tournaments from 2025. Headline sponsorship for the SOCCA World Cup in 2026 is Natural Elements.

=== Ambassadors ===
Popular football figures were signed on to be ambassadors, led by Brazilian World Cup winner Ronaldinho, who has played in Socca exhibition games in Pakistan in summer 2017. Other players that signed up to be ambassadors included Robert Pires and Ryan Giggs.

== Members ==
63 nations sorted by 2026 World Ranking (includes inactive and past members:

Asia (12)

- China
- Oman
- Pakistan
- India
- Syria
- Kuwait
- Saudi Arabia
- Iran
- Qatar
- Bahrain
- Iraq
- Indonesia

Africa (9)

- Egypt
- Morocco
- Mauritius
- Tunisia
- Nigeria
- Algeria
- Libya
- Cape Verde
- Angola

Americas (11)

- Brazil
- Mexico
- United States
- Chile
- Argentina
- Canada
- Costa Rica
- Colombia
- Uruguay
- Peru
- Paraguay

Euro (32)

- Kazakhstan
- Poland
- Germany
- Greece
- Ukraine
- Croatia
- Slovenia
- France
- England
- Moldova
- Scotland
- Russia
- Bulgaria
- Hungary
- Belgium
- Latvia
- Portugal
- Spain
- Georgia
- Cyprus
- Lithuania
- Romania
- Italy
- Ireland
- Albania
- Turkey
- Slovakia
- Luxembourg
- Switzerland
- Serbia
- Wales
- Montenegro

== ISF competitions ==
=== 6-a-Side World Cup ===
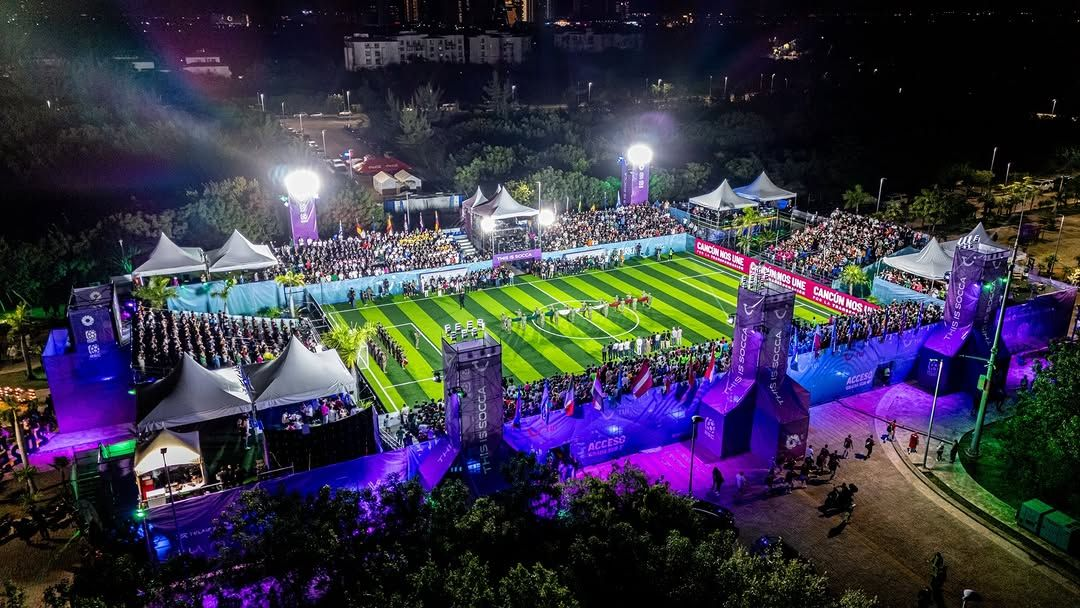
Opening ceremony of the annual TUI Socca 6-a-Side World Championships held in Cancún, Mexico

The inaugural 2018 Socca World Cup took place in Lisbon, Portugal, at the Trunkwala Stadium. It was refereed by Clattenburg. Successive World Cups were held in Rethymno, Greece (2019), Budapest, Hungary (2022), and Essen, Germany (2023), Muscat, Oman (2024), and Cancún, Mexico (2025).

=== Socca European Championship ===
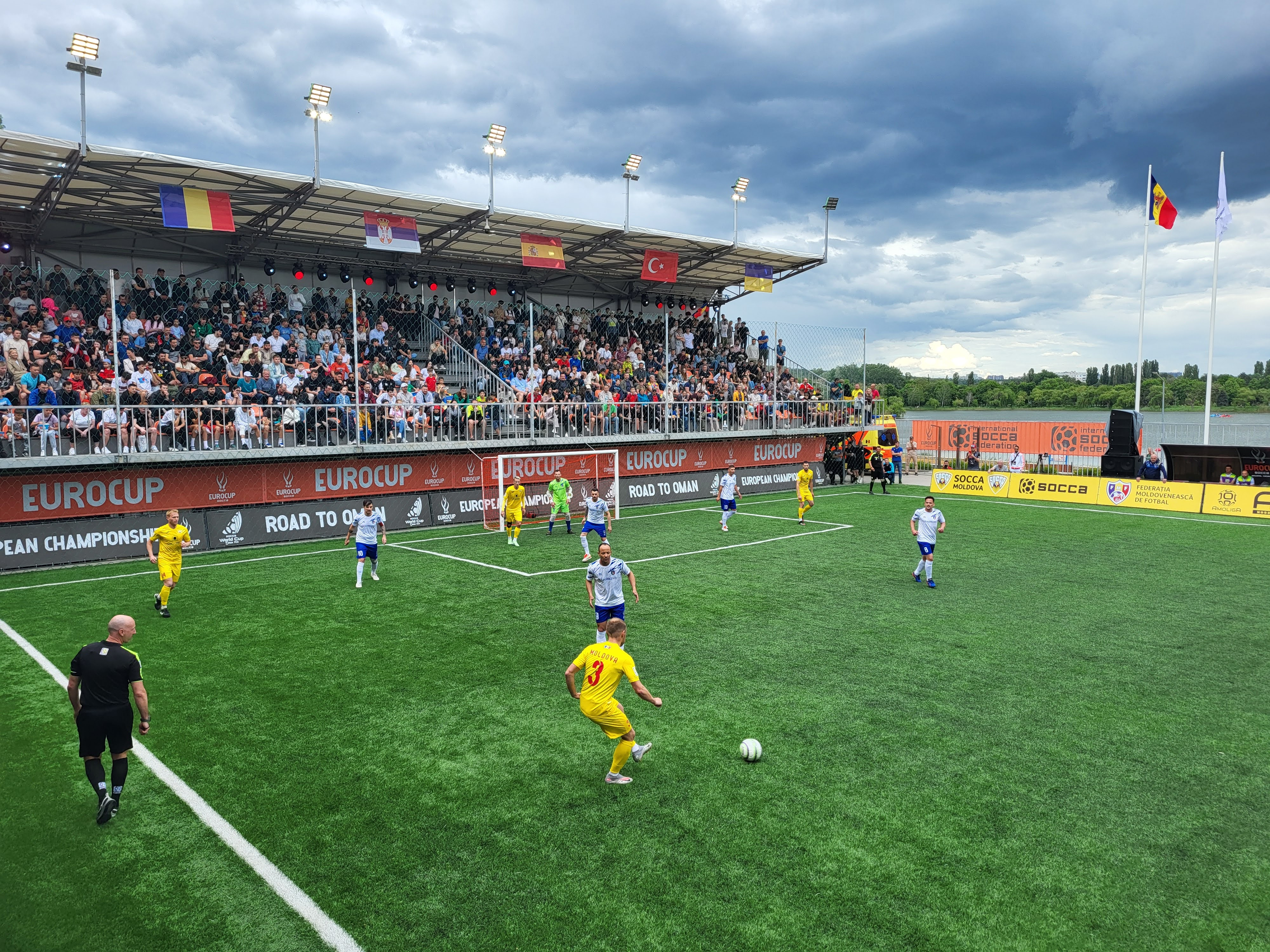
Socca EuroCup 2024 - Moldova - Italy

In 2023, The first Socca EuroCup took place in Chișinău, Moldova. Kazakhstan won 2-1 on penalties against Romania. 13 teams participated.

In 2024, the second Socca EuroCup took place in Chișinău, Moldova. Kazakhstan won 3-0 over against Croatia.

In 2025, the third Socca EuroCup took place in Chișinău, Moldova, where Poland were victorious over France by 4-2.

In 2026, Tirana, Albania hosted the SOCCA Euro. Holders Poland were knocked out by previous winners Kazakhstan. Spain were crowned champions after a 2-1 win over the Kazakhs.

=== Socca Champions League ===
The inaugural Socca Champions League tournament was held in October 2018 in Poreč, Croatia. Dynamik Toruń from Poland emerged as champions. A second Champions League was held in Maribor, Slovenia, in September 2019. Slovenian side ARKO Kljucarovci beat Dynamik Toruń 4–2 in overtime.

In 2025, the TUI Socca Champions League was held in Rethymno, Greece, in October 2025, where EXC Mobile Ochota from Warsaw, Poland, saw a 2-0 victory over German side, Eintracht Spandau.

=== SOCCA Copa América ===
The first SOCCA Copa América (Americup) took place in Cancún, Mexico, in 2024, with 16 teams participating. Mexico won the title after defeating the invited team, Hungary, 2-0 in the final.

The second edition of the tournament was held in Rio de Janeiro in 2025. Mexico again won the title, this time defeating Brazil 2-1.

The third edition is currently being held in Ciudad Juárez, Mexico.

SOCCA Broadcast

TV rights are sold around the world annually to almost 100 countries, around 20 to 30 web deals and is streamed live on the International Socca Federation YouTube channel. Viewing figures are in the tens of millions for World Cup events.

The most famous commentator to have worked on SOCCA is Howard Bentham who covered the World Cups in the early years. Ron Atkinson worked as a pundit. Former Premier League referee Peter Walton has also covered games as a co-commentator as well as working in an ambassadorial referee role.

Since 2023 Dan Shaw has covered almost every tournament, he joined SOCCA for the World Cup in 2023 where he worked alongside Rob Burke who was also present at the World Championships in Mexico 2025 as well as covering games remotely on Euro 2024, Grand Prix 7s 2024/2025 and the Gulf Cup 2024. Dan was promoted to senior commentator after the tournament and has since covered the World Cups in Oman 2024, Mexico 2025, Euro Cups in Moldova 2024 & 2025 and in Albania 2026. He also covered the Grand Prix 7's in Tbilisi, Georgia in 2024 and 2025 as well as the Champions League in 2024 and 2025 as well as the Agean Cup 2024 and first ever Women's Champions League in Portugal 2026. He will be present in Essen, Germany for 2026 after hosting the World Cup draw live from Braunschweig in June. He is the regular commentator for the major finals.

Frankie Rudland has been part of the team since the Oman World Cup in 2024 and was also present at the World Cup 2025 and Euro Cup 2026.

Niall McCaughan a former Manchester United and now BBC commentator was present at Oman 2024.

Martin "Scoop" Hopkins also covered the Oman World Cup 24, Mexico World Cup 25 and Euro Cup Moldova 25. He will be in Germany for World Cup 26.

== See also ==
- Five-a-side football
- Six-a-side football
- Seven-a-side football
- Socca
