= Vitalie Plămădeală =

Footballer

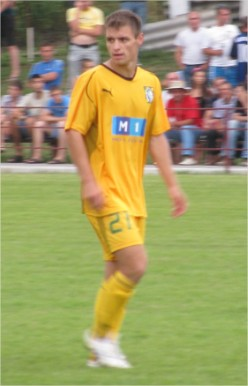

Personal information
- Full name: Vitalie Plămădeală
- Date of birth: 21 January 1985 (age 41)
- Place of birth: Moldova
- Height: 1.75 m (5 ft 9 in)
- Position: Midfielder

Team information
- Current team: Sfântul Gheorghe
- Number: 5

Senior career*
Years	Team	Apps	(Gls)
2007	Rapid Ghidighici	16	(0)
2008	Iskra-Stal Rîbniţa	27	(0)
2009–2010	Sfîntul Gheorghe	30	(3)
2010–2012	Zimbru Chişinău	60	(2)
2012–2013	Rapid Ghidighici	47	(2)
2014–2015	FK Buxoro	40	(1)
2015–2017	Speranța Nisporeni	30	(3)
2017	Petrocub Hîncești	12	(2)
2017–	Sfântul Gheorghe	90	(7)

International career
2010	Moldova	1	(0)
- * Club domestic league appearances and goals as of 13:52, 1 June 2021 (UTC)

Vitalie Plămădeală (born 21 January 1985 in Moldova) is a Moldovan footballer currently under contract for Sfântul Gheorghe Suruceni.

== Club career ==
=== Sfîntul Gheorghe ===
During the period at the team, he was the eldest player of Sfîntul Gheorghe and soon had become the captain.

=== Zimbru Chişinău ===
During the 2010 summer transfer period he moved to Zimbru, where he, actually, had started as a footballer. He made his debut at the team on 25 July 2010 playing the first match of the season against FC Sfîntul Gheorghe, his former team.

He scored his first goal on 23 April 2011 during an away match against FC Milsami.

== International career ==
Soon after his appointment as the coach of the National Team, Gavril Balint had chosen Vitalie Plămădeală as a national team player for a friendly match against the team of foreigners from the National Division (Moldova won 2–0).

== Socca career ==
After retiring from professional football, Plămădeală assumed the role of captain for the Moldovan national socca team.

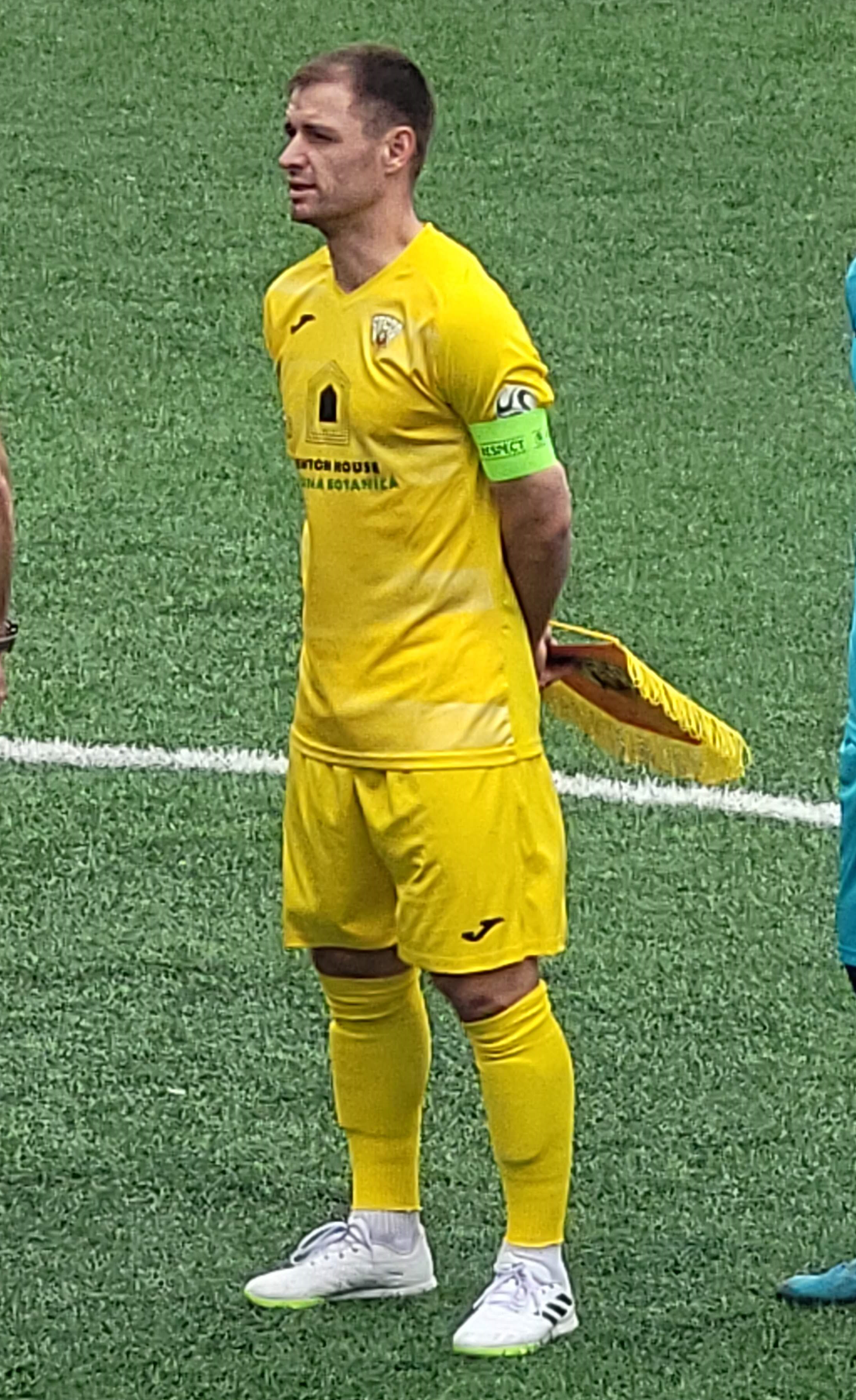
Plamadeala at Socca EuroCup 2024
