= TMRF Widzew Łódź =

Polish football club

- Full name: Towarzystwo Miłośników Rozwoju Fizycznego Widzew Łódź
- Nickname(s): Czerwona Armia (The Red Army); Drużyna z charakterem (Team with character)
- Founded: 1910; 115 years ago (original); 2014; 11 years ago (re-founded)
- Dissolved: 2016; 9 years ago (became Widzew II Łódź)
- Ground: Widzew Łódź Stadium
- Capacity: 10,500
- League: Klasa A, group: Łódź I (7th tier)
- 2015−16: Klasa A, group: Łódź I (7th tier), 2nd of 12
Home colours	Away colours

TMRF Widzew Łódź was a Polish football club. Originally founded in 1910 in the village of Widzew (now part of Łódź), it was dissolved with the outbreak of World War II.

In 2014, it was re-founded by Widzew Łódź fanatics. They won the Łódź I group of Klasa B (8th and bottom tier of the Polish football pyramid) in their first season and subsequently got promoted to Klasa A (7th tier). The club was created because fans of the original Widzew have been in a long conflict with the club board.
Only Widzew supporters were playing for this team, similar to the policy of KKS Wiara Lecha.

Before the start of the 2016−17 season, TMRF Widzew Łódź became Widzew Łódź's reserve team.
