= Socca World Cup =

International minifootball competition

- Founded: 2018
- Region: International (International Socca Federation)
- Teams: Different
- Most championships: Germany (2 Titles)
- Website: soccafederation.com
- 2026 Socca World Cup

The Socca World Cup is an international socca competition contested by the men's national teams of the members of International Socca Federation.

== History ==
The inaugural 2018 Socca World Cup took place in Lisbon, Portugal, at the purpose-built Trunkwala Stadium., from 23 till 29 September. Germany defeated Poland 1–0 in the final. The match was refereed by Mark Clattenburg.

The tournament received international coverage, including endorsements from Lukas Podolski and the Neymar Foundation.

The 2019 Socca World Cup took place in Rethymno, Crete, from 12 till 20 October. It was won by Russia, who defeated Poland 3–2 in the final.

The 2022 Socca World Cup was held in Budapest, Hungary, in September.

The 2023 Socca World Cup was held in Essen, Germany, from 2 till 11 June.

The 2024 Socca World Cup was held in Muscat, Oman, from 29 November to 7 December.

== Results ==
=== Men ===
==== Results ====
Year	Hosts	Final			Third place match		
Year	Hosts	Champions	Score	Runners-up	Third place	Score	Fourth place
2018; Details	Lisbon, Portugal	Germany	1–0	Poland	Russia	2–1	Portugal
2019; Details	Rethymno, Crete, Greece	Russia	3–2	Poland	Greece	2–1	Moldova
2022; Details	Budapest, Hungary	Brazil	3–0	Kazakhstan	Poland	3–1	Germany
2023; Details	Essen, Germany	Kazakhstan	2–2 (2–1 p)	Ukraine	Mexico	2–0	Croatia
2024; Details	Muscat, Oman	Oman	1–1 (1–0 p)	Kazakhstan	Croatia	2–0	Romania
2025; Details	Cancún, Mexico	Poland	3–1	Mexico	Kazakhstan	3–1	Netherlands
2026; Details	Essen, Germany	Germany	3–1	Brazil	Poland	6–0	Croatia

==== Teams reaching the final ====
Teams reaching the top four
Team	Titles	Runners-up	Third place	Top 3 total
Germany	2 (2018, 2026)	0	0	2
Poland	1 (2025)	2	2	5
Kazakhstan	1 (2023)	2	1	4
Brazil	1 (2022)	1	0	2
Russia	1 (2019)	0	1	2
Oman	1 (2024)	0	0	1
Ukraine		1		1
Greece			1	1
Mexico			1	1
Croatia			1	1

== See also ==
- International Socca Federation
- Socca EuroCup
- Homeless World Cup
- World Cup of Masters
