= Guido Tepshi =

Albanian footballer

Personal information
- Full name: Guido Edmond Tepshi
- Date of birth: 8 April 1991 (age 35)
- Place of birth: Durrës, Albania
- Position: Attacking midfielder

Youth career
- –2008: Teuta Durrës
- 2009–2010: Bohemians Praha

Senior career*
Years	Team	Apps	(Gls)
2008–2009	Teuta	0	(0)
2009	→ Lushnja (loan)	8	(0)
2009–2010	Bohemians Praha	0	(0)
2010–2011	Kastrioti	17	(1)
2011	→ Lushnja (loan)	6	(1)
2012	Kamza	9	(1)
2012	Apolonia	7	(0)
2013	Teuta	3	(0)
2013–2014	Kastrioti	15	(0)
2016–2017	Këlcyra		

International career
- Albania U17
2009–2010	Albania U19	3	(0)
2010–2011	Albania U21	0	(0)
- * Club domestic league appearances and goals

Guido Edmond Tepshi (born 8 April 1991) is an Albanian footballer who played in the Albanian Superliga.
