= Tibor Sóron =

Hungarian footballer

Personal information
- Full name: Tibor Sóron
- Date of birth: 18 January 1993 (age 33)
- Place of birth: Esztergom, Hungary
- Height: 1.74 m (5 ft 9 in)
- Position: Forward

Team information
- Current team: Bicskei TC
- Number: 21

Youth career
- 2003–2008: Esztergom
- 2008–2010: Vasas
- 2012–2013: Dunaújváros

Senior career*
Years	Team	Apps	(Gls)
2010–2012	FC Esztergom	49	(28)
2012–2016	Dunaújváros	42	(1)
2016	Ajka	12	(0)
2016–2017	Rákosment	31	(8)
2017–2018	Kaposvár	28	(11)
2018–2019	III. Kerület	15	(8)
2019	Vác	16	(5)
2019–2020	Szeged-Csanád	11	(0)
2020	III. Kerületi	2	(0)
2020–2021	Vác	19	(4)
2021–	Bicskei	58	(37)
- * Club domestic league appearances and goals as of 20:07, 9 January 2023 (UTC)

Tibor Sóron (born 18 January 1993) is a Hungarian football player who currently plays for Bicskei TC.

== Career statistics ==
Appearances and goals by club, season and competition
Club	Season	League		Cup		League Cup		Europe		Total	
Club	Season	Apps	Goals	Apps	Goals	Apps	Goals	Apps	Goals	Apps	Goals
Esztergom
Esztergom	2010–11	23	8	1	0	0	0	0	0	24	8
Esztergom	2011–12	26	20	0	0	0	0	0	0	26	20
Esztergom	Total	49	28	1	0	0	0	0	0	50	28
Dunaújváros
Dunaújváros	2012–13	10	1	5	3	0	0	0	0	15	4
Dunaújváros	2013–14	13	0	3	1	3	0	0	0	19	1
Dunaújváros	2014–15	5	0	0	0	8	0	0	0	13	0
Dunaújváros	Total	28	1	8	4	11	0	0	0	47	5
Career total		77	29	9	4	11	0	0	0	97	33

Updated to games played as of 9 December 2014.
