= KKS Wiara Lecha Poznań =

Polish sports club

Wiara Lecha
- Full name: Kibolski Klub Sportowy; Wiara Lecha Poznań
- Nicknames: Kolejorz (The Railwayman); Kibole (Fans)
- Founded: 2010; 16 years ago (futsal); 2011; 15 years ago (association football); 2019; 7 years ago (basketball); 2020; 6 years ago (rugby union)
- Ground: Youth Sports Centre
- Capacity: 1,000
- Owner: Stowarzyszenie Wiara Lecha
- Chairman: Paweł Piestrzyński
- Coach: Łukasz Kubiak
- League: V liga Greater Poland
- 2025–26: IV liga Greater Poland, 15th of 18 (relegated via play-offs)
- Website: https://www.wiaralecha.pl
Traditional colours	Reverse colours	Alternate colours

Wiara Lecha Poznań or Drużyna Wiary Lecha abbreviated to DWL, is a sports club from Poznań founded by Lech Poznań supporters in 2010 and ran by the former official Lech Poznań supporter group Wiara Lecha. Only active supporters can play in the team and they have to have made a contribution to the supporter scene in order to be admitted to the squad. It has association football, basketball, rugby union and futsal teams.

== Foundation and club culture ==
Initial crest of the association that founded the sports club, which also used it as its crest until 2024

Many Lech Poznań supporters felt that heavy handed policing, frequent games behind closed doors, and the rising pressure on supporter groups and amount of responsibility pinned on them, and restrictions regarding tifos and pyrotechnics has made supporting Lech, one of the country's top teams less enjoyable. In order to reclaim some of the spontaneity and be able to participate in the ultras scene more freely a "fans football club, for the fans, by the fans" was set up in 2011, however unlike many other supporter owned clubs (e.g.: F.C. United of Manchester, GKS Górnik 1979 Łęczna, TMRF Widzew) the club was not set up in protest of the club itself.

In December 2013, "Wiara Lecha" ceased being the official supporter association of the Lech Poznań football club, due to the increasing stigmatisation and criminalisation of fans by the authorities and the media. A new association Stowarzyszenie Kibiców Lecha Poznań was formed which took over the role as being the main supporter group of Lech Poznań, replacing Stowarzyszenie Wiara Lecha. However, Wiara Lecha, instead of dissolving, fully committed to running the new fan-owned football club.

The condition to become a player is that one has to be an active supporter and they have to have made a contribution to Lech's supporter scene. Despite their lowly ranking in the football pyramid, for important matches up to 800 fans can be present, often presenting choreographies during matches.

== Etymology ==
The name comes from the former name of Lech Poznań supporter group Wiara Lecha, with the word Wiara meaning "faith" in standard Polish language and "people" in local slang. Kibolski Klub Sportowy means "Fans Sports Club", kibol being a slang term for supporter. The abbreviation KKS is also present in the name of Lech Poznań (where K stands for Kolejowy; 'railway').

== Player and staff admission policy ==
All those involved in the club have to be active Lech Poznań supporters with a season ticket and attend at least 4 away matches every season.

== Association football ==
=== Playing history ===
Before joining the league pyramid structure, the Lech fans played in various 5-a-side, 7-a-side, summer, indoor and outdoor amateur tournaments. The club's inaugural 2012/2013 season and first ever league match was a 3–1 win over SKS 13 Poznań, in B-klasa, the eighth tier of Polish football. Whilst in the division, matches against Odlew Poznań were of particular interest, dubbed the "Poznań derby", as the only two teams with a media presence but also mostly due to the opposition of Gazeta Wyborcza and the media in general by the Lech fans, although Odlew was quick to denounce its ties to the newspaper; Odlew so far has lost ever derby game against Wiara Lecha. The team was widely tipped to gain immediate promotion to the A-klasa, which was fulfilled after coming second in the division, only behind KS Gniezno. The players and fans celebrated the promotion by presenting a tifo display against SKS 13 Poznań on 23 June 2013

The team has quickly established itself in the A-klasa, although they were favourites to gain a second successive promotion in the 2013/2014 season, needing to win against Concordia Murowana Goślina with the final clash between the two happening with 2 league games to spare. The match which was played inside Lech's stadium in front of a few thousand strong crowd was narrowly lost, which allowed Concordia to leapfrog Wiara Lecha in the table and as they did not drop any points it was Concordia who won the league and was promoted. The club continued aiming for promotion, which they finally achieved in June 2015 in a match against Clescevia Kleszczewo, with the last game of the season, a 4–0 win over Orkan Jarosławiec celebrated at Lech's stadium in front of 500 fans.

During the winter break of the 2015–2016 season, a new manager Jarosław Wróblewski was hired, with the aim to reach the fifth national tier in time for the 2017–2018 season. This was after it was announced that the club parted ways with Dariusz Kustoń, the club's first ever manager, in December 2015. The regional league structure however was changed in 2017, with the club finding themselves in an inter-district division rather than a district league, and the clubs aims changed.

In late September 2018, the club beat Meblorz Swarzędz in the regional Polish Cup 1–0 away at the local Municipal Stadium in Swarzędz in front of c.600 fans of both teams; both sets of fans presented tifos and the match was described as a true celebration of football fandom.

By 2019 the club has aimed to consolidate its position within the new inter-district league before mounting a challenge to be promoted up to the fifth national tier, which would be a significant organisational step-up as well as a sporting one.

=== Managerial history ===
- 2011–2015 – Dariusz Kustoń
- 2015–2020 – Jarosław Wróblewski
- 2020–2025 – Łukasz Kubiak
- 2025 – Jarosław Araszkiewicz
- 2025–2026 – Piotr Sołtysiak
- 2026–present – Łukasz Kubiak

== Futsal ==
Before joining the association football league pyramid structure, the Lech fans played in various 5-a-side, 7-a-side, summer, indoor and outdoor amateur tournaments. They have continued to participate in those as a futsal team. The club participated in various charity tournaments under the name Blue White Poznań, winning the 2010 Mariusz Heintze Charity Tournament and runner-up in the 2010 Prezydent Cup. In 2018 they reached the Greater Poland Regional Polish Cup finals group stage.

== Basketball ==
In September 2019 a new basketball section was created in order to restore the past basketball glories of Lech Poznań. They won their first match in round three of the local third division, the lowest league in the pyramid.

== Rugby ==
The club has founded a rugby union section in 2020 on the basis of NKR Chaos Poznań, an amateur club founded by Lech supporters in 2001. The new section debuted in a rugby sevens Polish Cup tournament in June 2020.
