= Odlew Poznań =

- Full name: Husarski Klub Sportowy; Odlew Poznań
- Founded: 2002; 24 years ago
- Ground: ul. Ptasia Training Facilities
- Capacity: 1,000
- Chairman: Michał Bartkowiak
- Coach: Jan Andrzejewski
- League: Klasa B Greater Poland IV
- 2024–25: 9th of 12
- Website: odlew.poznan.pl

HKS Odlew Poznań is a Polish amateur association football club from Poznań, Greater Poland. Despite its lowly position in the football league pyramid, the club has gained widespread notoriety and almost legendary status for its humorous approach to football and promotion of football at the amateur level, making it one of the best supported and recognisable non-professional football clubs. As of the 2024/25 season they finished 9th in Klasa B.

== Etymology ==
The club name was chosen on the basis of the popular 1988 comedy film Piłkarski Poker which, although fictitious, was later widely seen to have been an accurate representation of match-fixing practices at the time. One of the fictitious clubs in the league was a team by the name Odlew Poznań, which only had a few seconds' worth of appearances in the film and a very minor role to the plot, the chairman of the club being even denied a speaking part.

The founders of the club were inspired by the Warsaw-based club Karmazyn Warsaw, (Note: At the time when Odlew was founded, Karmazyn Warszawa played in the Warsaw klasa C, the eight level of association football. The club withdrew after the 2001/02 season due to organizational issues.) who similarly gained notoriety for their poor performances and humorous approach to amateur football.

The abbreviation "HKS" stands for Husarski Klub Sportowy, meaning Hussar Sports Club, chosen as there were no other clubs with such a name (as opposed to the popular "KS", "PKS" or "FC" abbreviations).

== History and humour ==
Alternate club crest

Originally the club was set up by Gazeta Wyborcza reporters, although the club has moved away from its image as a "reporter club".

After having the worst record of all the teams in Greater Poland in their inaugural season in 2002 in the lowest division B-klasa, the club adopted slogans such as "We're the worst, we want to be better", "A real defeat is not to lose, but not to try in the first place", "Hope dies last", "Odlew will always stay up" (they play in the bottom division, therefore there is no relegation from the division) and modifying the former popular advert "Almost like Żywiec - Almost makes a huge difference" to "Almost like Odlew". Their recent fortunes have varied, almost gaining promotion a few times to the A-klasa (but having never been able to achieve promotion) means that the club is now regularly achieving its goal to not be the worst-placed team in the country. On their website, the table is routinely turned upside down. "This way we can be top" is the official reason.

To celebrate their 10th anniversary in 2012, the club organised a match with the (arguably) best amateur team in the world, the champion of San Marino, F.C. Domagnano, prompting a "best v worst team in the world" comparison. Odlew only just lost the match 0–1 after a hard-fought evenly matched game.

The club secured a very lucrative (especially for a club its size) sponsorship agreement with Europe's largest brewery Obolon. Later Odlew challenged the Waldemar Fornalik's national team to a match after a series of disappointing results by the national side, claiming "there are no weak sides anymore"; however, the challenge was not accepted.

== Supporters and rivalries ==
The club boasts such fans such as Czesław Michniewicz, Bogusław Baniak, Rafał Ulatowski, Katarzyna Skowrońska-Dolata, and Franciszek Smuda, who when asked is there any team he is afraid of replied "Yes, Odlew".

They have good relations with local professional teams Lech and Warta, often playing friendly matches against them. After the establishment of KKS Wiara Lecha, the frequent encounters were immediately dubbed the "Poznań Derby", prompting major mobilisation among the Lech fans due to the opposition of Gazeta Wyborcza and media in general, although Odlew was quick to denounce its ties to the newspaper. Odlew so far has lost ever derby game against Wiara Lecha.

The club even had a short-lived ultras group Młoda Nabojka. The fans also frequently appear supporting the Poland national team in other sports, as well as having produced supporter merchandise common for fans of much larger teams, such as scarves and flags.

Currently, the fans (and players) maintain good relations with Błękitni Owińska, as well of course their protoplast Karmazyn Warszawa. Their main rivals are listed as the WZPN match observers, Rakieta Biedrusko and referee "Mr Paluszak from Stryków".
