= Wang Hongwei (footballer) =

Chinese footballer (born 1979)

Personal information
- Date of birth: 28 November 1979 (age 46)
- Place of birth: Liaoning, China
- Height: 1.82 m (6 ft 0 in)
- Position: Defender

Senior career*
Years	Team	Apps	(Gls)
1997–2008	Shenzhen Xiangxue Eisiti		

Managerial career
- 2008: Shenzhen Xiangxue Eisiti (assistant)
- 2009: Shenzhen Xiangxue Eisiti
- 2011-2014: Shenzhen Ruby (assistant)
- 2015-2016: Meixian Techand
- 2017: Baotou Lucheng
- 2017-2018: Yancheng Dafeng
- 2019-2020: Sichuan Jiuniu
- 2022-2023: Dongguan United
- 2025: Foshan Nanshi
- * Club domestic league appearances and goals

Wang Hongwei (Chinese: 王宏伟; born 28 November 1979) is a Chinese football manager and former footballer.

== Early life ==
Wang was born in 1979 in China. He is a native of Liaoning, China.

== Player Career ==
Wang started his career with Chinese side Shenzhen Ping An and won the first Chinese Super League title with the club. Wang retired from professional football in 2008.

== Style of play ==
Wang mainly operated as a midfielder. He was described as "the kind of master who specializes in dirty work".

== Personal life ==
Wang has been nicknamed "Iron Waist". He has enjoyed watching Korean dramas.
