= Luca Napoleone =

Belgian footballer

Personal information
- Full name: Luca Rocco Napoleone
- Date of birth: 30 September 1993 (age 33)
- Place of birth: Gosselies, Belgium
- Height: 1.81 m (5 ft 11 in)
- Position: Midfielder

Team information
- Current team: Tienen
- Number: 29

Youth career
- 1999–2000: RCCF
- 2000–2005: Charleroi
- 2005–2006: La Louvière
- 2006–2007: RWDM
- 2007–2009: RAEC

Senior career*
| Years | Team | Apps | (Gls) |
| 2009–2012 | ROCCM | 7 | (0) |
| 2012–2014 | Francs Borains | | |
| 2014–2015 | Walhain | 26 | (3) |
| 2015–2016 | RFCB Sprimont | 31 | (4) |
| 2016–2017 | RFCU Kelmis | 24 | (10) |
| 2017–2018 | Heist | 28 | (14) |
| 2018–2019 | Mouscron | 5 | (0) |
| 2019 | Virton | 6 | (0) |
| 2019–2020 | RWD Molenbeek | 16 | (1) |
| 2020–2021 | ROCCM | 6 | (1) |
| 2021 | Real Avilés | 10 | (0) |
| 2021–2022 | Patro Eisden | 6 | (1) |
| 2022–2023 | Wiltz 71 | 26 | (5) |
| 2024 | CSM Reșița | 5 | (1) |
| 2024–2025 | UR Namur | 21 | (1) |
| 2025– | Tienen | 8 | (0) |
- * Club domestic league appearances and goals as of 3 May 2026

Luca Rocco Napoleone (born 30 September 1993) is a Belgian professional footballer who plays as a midfielder for Belgian club Tienen.

== Club career ==
After successfully completing studies in physical education, Napoleone fully dedicated himself to football and signed his first professional contract on 26 February 2018. He made his debut in the Belgian top flight for Royal Excel Mouscron on 28 July 2018 against KV Oostende. He received his first titularisation on 5 August 2018 against Club Brugge.
