= Socca EuroCup =

International minifootball competition

- Founded: 2023
- Region: Europe (International Socca Federation)
- Teams: Different
- Current champions: Spain
- Most championships: Kazakhstan (2 championships)
- Website: soccafederation.com
- 2026 Socca EuroCup

The Socca EuroCup is a competition organised by the governing body of small-sided football, the International Socca Federation. The competition contested by the men's national teams of Europe, who all hold an annual ISF Membership.

== History ==
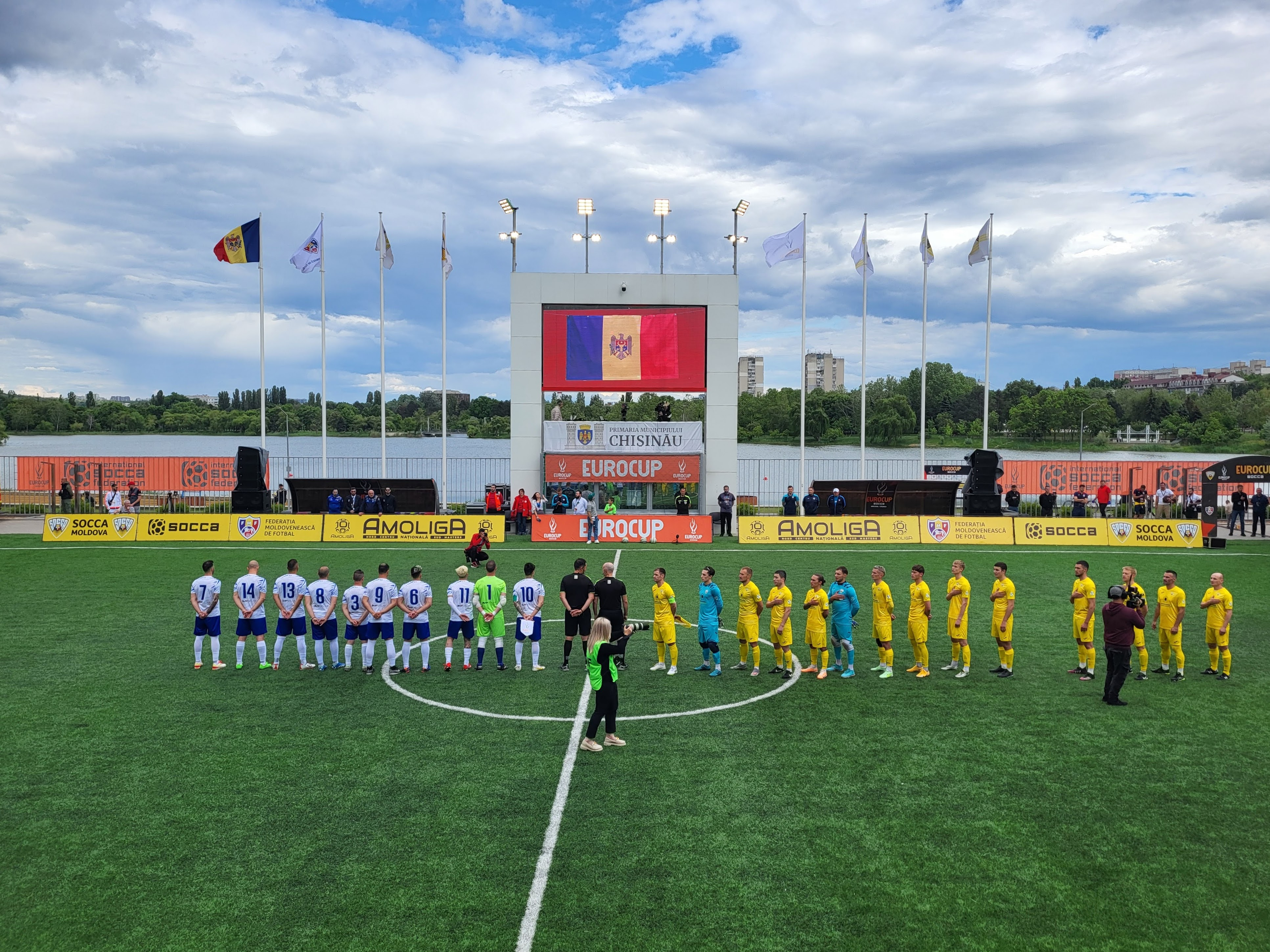
Socca EuroCup 2024

The first ever Socca EuroCup was played in Moldova between 29 March and 2 April 2023. 13 teams from across Europe took part in it. All games were held at the FMF Beach Soccer Arena. In the qualifying, Romania and Georgia finish as group winners. They automatically qualify for the 2023 Socca World Cup. Albania and Cyprus played in the 3rd place match. Albania have won and secured the final qualifying slot for the World Cup. In the main competition, Georgia and Croatia facing off in the 3rd place match. Croatia have won 1–0 to take the bronze medals. In the final, Kazakhstan and Romania played for gold medals. The game finished as a draw and went to penalties. 2022 Socca World Cup runners-up Kazakshtan have won the first ever Socca EuroCup.

The EuroCup returned to Moldova in 2024 and 2025.

== Results ==
#	Year	Hosts	Final			Third place match		
#	Year	Hosts	Champions	Score	Runners-up	Third place	Score	Fourth place
1	2023; Details	Chișinău, Moldova	Kazakhstan	3–3 (pen. 2–1)	Romania	Croatia	1–0	Georgia
2	2024; Details	Chișinău, Moldova	Kazakhstan	3–0	Croatia	Romania	2–2 (pen. 3–2)	Oman
3	2025; Details	Chișinău, Moldova	Poland	4–2	France	Croatia	2–1	Spain
4	2026; Details	Tirana, Albania	Spain	2–1	Kazakhstan	Serbia	2–0	Hungary

== See also ==
- Socca World Cup
- International Socca Federation
- Socca
- Five-a-side football
- Six-a-side football
- Seven-a-side football
