= Duje Medak =

Croatian footballer

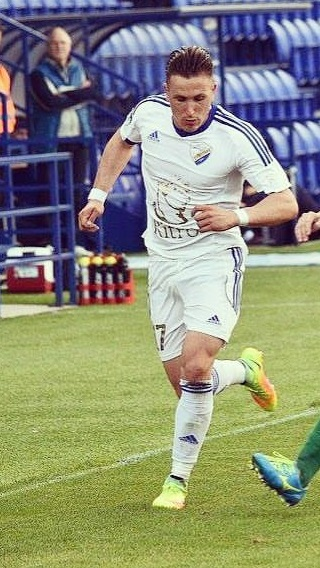
- Medak playing for Poprad in 2017

Personal information
- Full name: Duje Medak
- Date of birth: 19 December 1993 (age 32)
- Place of birth: Split, Croatia
- Height: 1.75 m (5 ft 9 in)
- Position: Defensive midfielder

Team information
- Current team: Metković

Youth career
- –2008: Metković
- 2008–2012: Hajduk Split

Senior career*
Years	Team	Apps	(Gls)
2012–2013	Hajduk Split	1	(0)
2012–2013	→ Primorac 1929 (loan)	23	(2)
2013–2014	Inter Zaprešić	17	(2)
2014–2015	Solin	20	(4)
2016	Neretvanac	31	(6)
2017–2018	Poprad	43	(7)
2019	GOŠK Gabela	11	(0)
2019–2021	Neretvanac		
2021–2023	ONK Metković		
- * Club domestic league appearances and goals

Duje Medak (born 19 December 1993) is a Croatian professional football and futsal midfielder.

== Club career ==
Medak joined Bosnian side GOŠK Gabela in January 2019. On 26 July 2019 Neretvanac Opuzen confirmed, that Medak had returned to the club. In February 2021, Medak moved to ONK Metković.
