= Socca =

Variant of association football

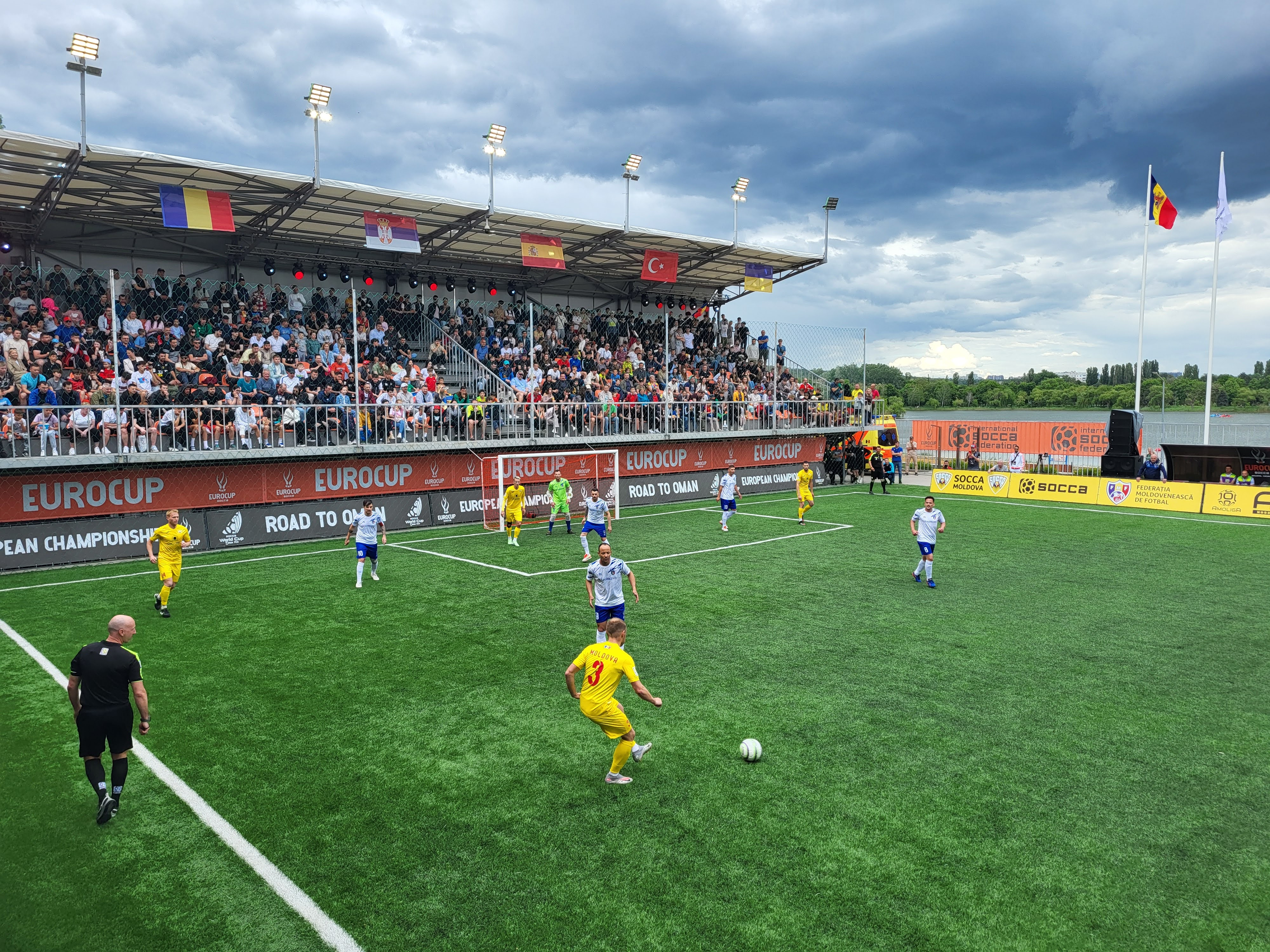
- Socca
- Highest governing body: International Socca Federation

Characteristics
- Contact: Yes
- Team members: 5-7 per side (including goalkeeper)
- Mixed-sex: No
- Type: Team sport, Football

Presence
- Olympic: No
- Paralympic: No

Socca is a small-sided team sports variant of association football, best known in 6-a-side 40-minute format. It is also played in a 7-a-side format.

The International Socca Federation (ISF) is a governing body for Socca.

== Description ==
Socca is governed by the International Socca Federation (ISF), one of the global governing bodies of small-sided football. ISF differs from the WMF, the governing body of minifootball, as they organise, manage, and host 5-, 6-, and 7-a-side international club and national tournaments and competitions. It's understood that Socca is intermediate between amateur football, small-sided football, and futsal in terms of field dimensions and number of players per side, players from all of these codes have been selected for national ISF team competitions.

Matches are played in 2 halves of 20 (sometimes 25) minutes each with a 5-minute break. Teams consist of a goalkeeper and five outfield players.

Matches are played on artificial turf. The maximum field of play is 60 m × 35 m (197 ft × 115 ft), and the size of the goal is 4 m × 2 m (13.1 ft × 6.6 ft).

Yellow cards may result in the offending player being sent to the "sin bin" for 2 minutes. Red cards work in the same way as association football, the offending player being dismissed from the match.

The penalty kick, called Socca Penalty, is different from association football and the WMF-sanctioned minifootball, where the kick is done from the Socca Penalty mark on the center of the pitch.

== Competitions ==
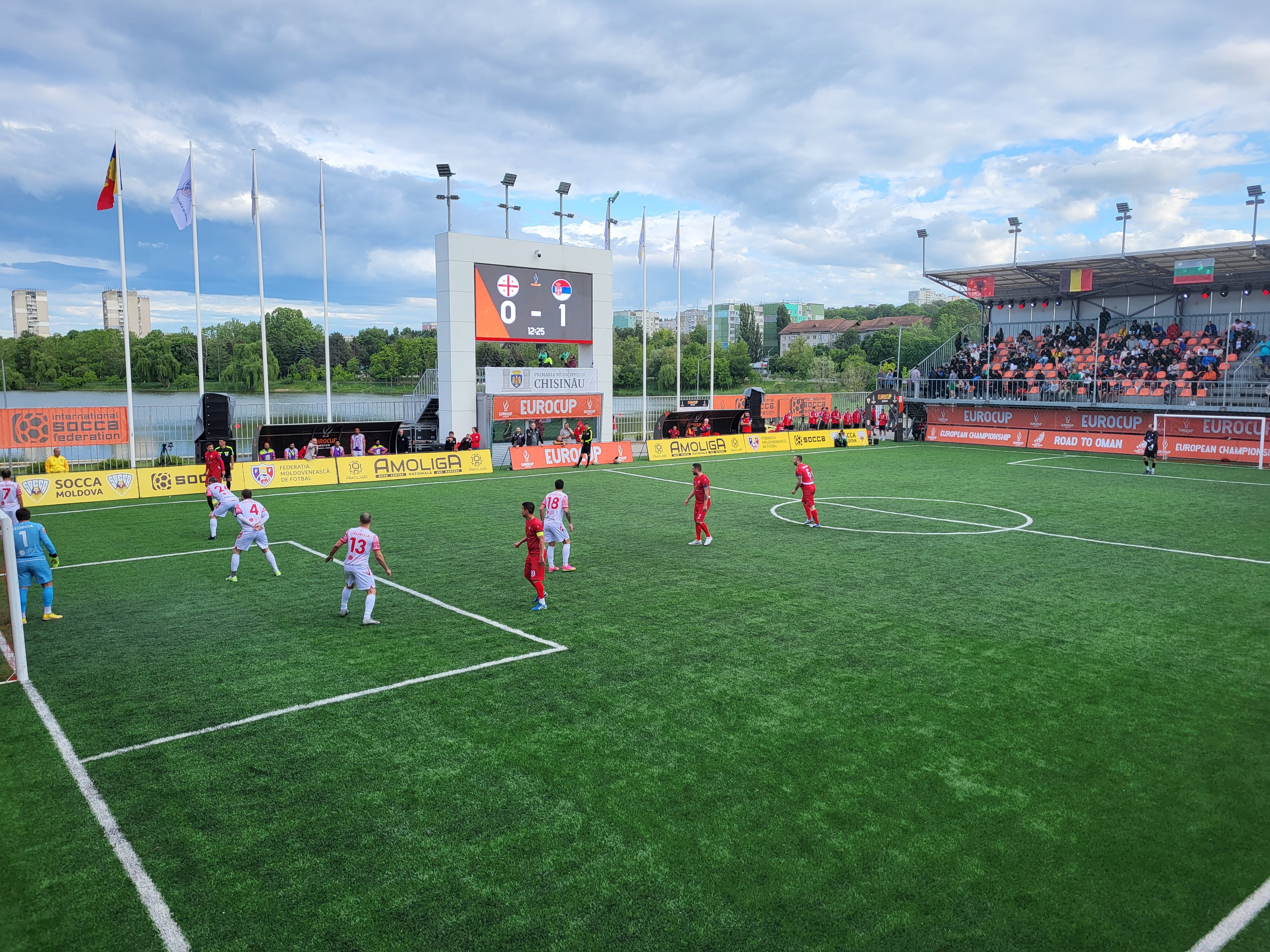
Socca EuroCup 2024 Serbia — Georgia in Chișinău, Moldova

The primary competition for national socca teams is the Socca World Cup. For clubs, the corresponding competition is the Socca Champions League, which has been held annually in Rethymno in 2024 and 2025 and will be held again there in 2026. Regional competitions also exist, such as the Socca EuroCup, the Socca Gulf Cup, and the Socca Americup.

== See also ==
- Five-a-side football
- Seven-a-side football
- Indoor soccer
- Freestyle football
- Street football
