= Omar Belbachir =

French footballer (born 1980)

Personal information
- Date of birth: 13 December 1980 (age 45)
- Place of birth: Bordeaux, France
- Height: 1.70 m (5 ft 7 in)
- Position: Defender

Team information
- Current team: Stade Bordelais

Senior career*
Years	Team	Apps	(Gls)
1999–2000	Villenave-d'Ornon		
2000–2002	Pau	59	(0)
2002–2004	Istres	19	(0)
2004–2006	did not play		
2006	OH Leuven		
2007	Kelmis		
2007–2012	Pau	20	(0)
2012–	Stade Bordelais		
- * Club domestic league appearances and goals as of 12 May 2008

Omar Belbachir (born 13 December 1980) is a French former footballer. He currently plays in the Championnat de France amateur for Stade Bordelais.
