= Giorgi Kiknadze =

Georgian footballer (born 1976)

Georgi Kiknadze
Personal information
- Date of birth: 26 April 1976 (age 50)
- Place of birth: Tbilisi, Georgian SSR, then Soviet Union
- Position: Midfielder

Senior career*
Years	Team	Apps	(Gls)
1993–1998	Dinamo Tbilisi	123	(16)
1998–1999	Torpedo Kutaisi		
1999–2000	Samsunspor	4	(0)
2000–2003	SC Freiburg	0	(0)
2003–2004	Spartaki Tbilisi		
2005–2006	Lokomotivi Tbilisi		

International career
1996–1999	Georgia	10	(1)

Managerial career
- 2006–2007: Olimpi Rustavi
- 2007: Torpedo Kutaisi
- 2007–2010: Lokomotivi Tbilisi
- * Club domestic league appearances and goals

Georgi Kiknadze (Georgian: გიორგი კიკნაძე; born 26 April 1976) is a Georgian former football player and coach. He played as a midfielder for FC Dinamo Tbilisi, FC Torpedo Kutaisi, Samsunspor, SC Freiburg, Lokomotivi Tbilisi, Spartaki Tbilisi and the Georgian national team. As part of the Dinamo Tbilisi team he won the Umaglesi Liga five times running from 1994 to 1998, and the Georgian Cup four years running from 1994 to 1997. He was also a runner-up in the Georgian Cup in 1998.

== Career ==
Kiknadze joined Turkish club Samsunspor in October 1999, but stayed only one season, making just four appearances before moving to SC Freiburg in Germany. He failed to make the first team in his two seasons in Germany, and in 2003 he was released by Freiburg. He then returned to Georgia, where he played for Lokomotivi Tbilisi and later Spartaki Tbilisi.

He made his international debut on 5 December 1996 in a friendly match against Lebanon. Kiknadze captained the side in a 4–2 defeat, scoring Georgia's second goal. He obtained the last of his ten international caps on 28 April 1999, coming on as a substitute in a 4–1 loss against Norway.

Kiknadze started the 2006–07 season as coach of Olimpi Rustavi, entering coaching at the relatively young age of 30. This was Olimpi Rustavi's first season of existence; the club formed in 2006 following a merger between FC Tbilisi and FC Rustavi. At the start of the season Kiknadze led the club to a run of eight matches without conceding a single goal. However, midway through the season, with Olimpi leading the league, Kiknadze left the club after failing to agree terms on a new contract. Olimpi continued the good form they had enjoyed under Kiknadze, and won the league title. Kiknadze subsequently became coach at Torpedo Kutaisi, but just stayed in the job just one month. He became the coach of Lokomotivi Tbilisi on 7 April 2007.

Kiknadze's nephew Levan Kenia is also a professional footballer, playing for Czech club Slavia Prague.
