= Tobias Haitz =

German footballer

Personal information
- Date of birth: 12 February 1992 (age 34)
- Place of birth: Aachen, Germany
- Height: 1.88 m (6 ft 2 in)
- Position: Centre back

Youth career
- –2007: Alemannia Aachen
- 2007–2010: Bayer Leverkusen

Senior career*
Years	Team	Apps	(Gls)
2010	Bayer Leverkusen	0	(0)
2010–2013	Bayer Leverkusen II	54	(3)
2013–2015	NEC	24	(0)
2015–2016	Viktoria Köln	15	(1)
2016–2017	Alemannia Aachen	18	(2)
2017–2018	Sportfreunde Lotte	0	(0)
Total		111	(6)

International career
2010–2011	Germany U19	2	(0)
- * Club domestic league appearances and goals

Tobias Haitz (born 12 February 1992) is a German former professional footballer who played as a centre back.

He is a youth international for Germany at U19 level.

In May 2018, he announced his retirement at the age of 26.

== Honours ==
NEC

- Eerste Divisie: 2014–15
