= List of FC Sheriff Tiraspol seasons =

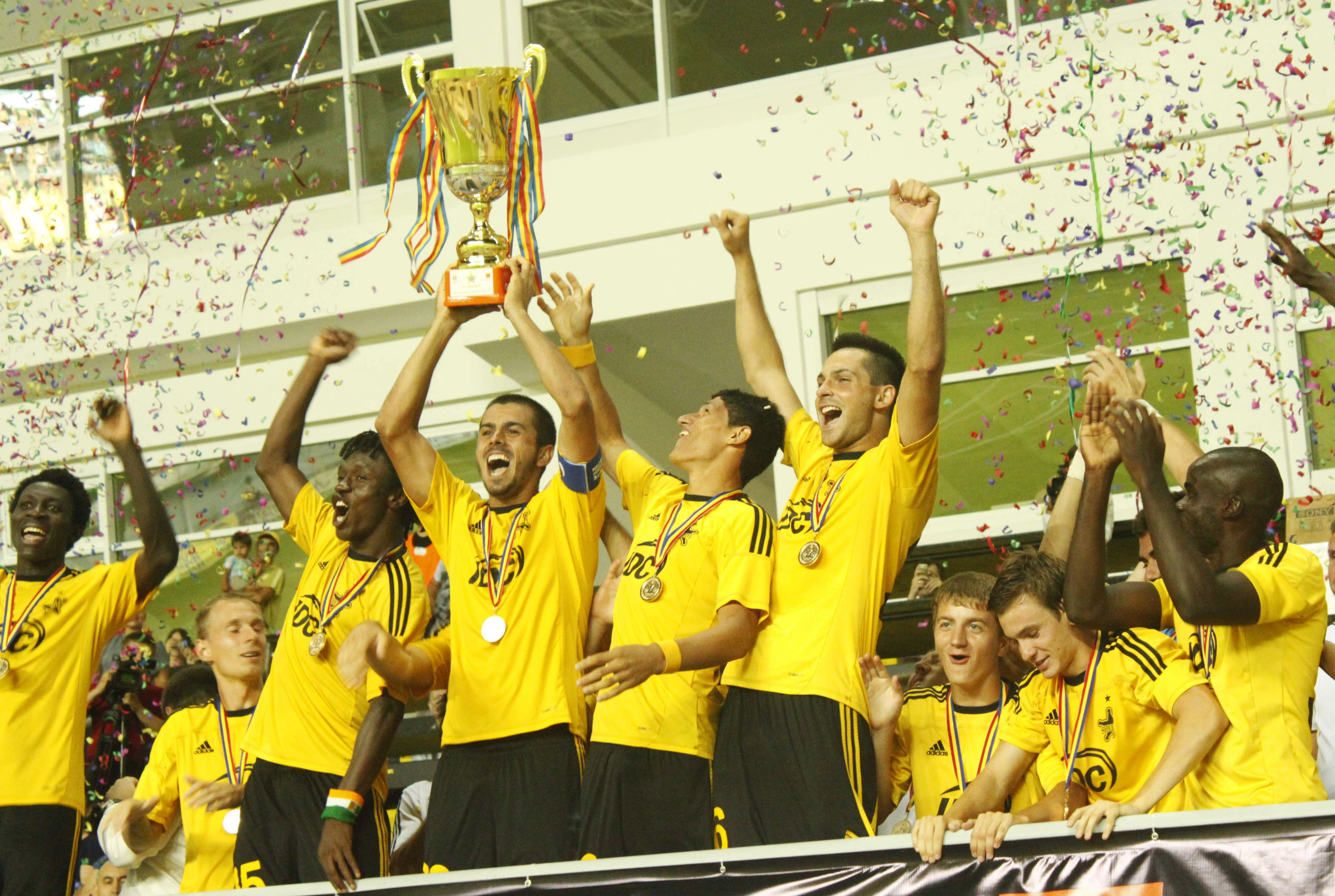
FC Sheriff Tiraspol players celebrate winning the 2013 Moldovan Super Cup.

Fotbal Club Sheriff, commonly known as FC Sheriff Tiraspol, is an association football club based in Tiraspol, Moldova. The club was founded in 1996 as Tiras Tiraspol and was selected to participate in the Moldovan "B" Division the same year. In their debut season they were champions of the "B" Division's South group achieving promotion to the "A" Division. In April 1997 the company Sheriff became the team's general sponsor giving the club its current name. FC Sheriff were champions of the "A" Division at the first attempt, achieving successive titles and promotion to the Moldovan National Division. They were not as successful in the Moldovan Cup as they were eliminated in the first round.

FC Sheriff finished fourth in their first National Division season which is currently their lowest top-flight finish. They won the 1999 cup final, by doing so Sheriff qualified for the 1999–2000 qualifying round for the UEFA Cup. FC Sheriff's first European opponents were Czech side SK Sigma Olomouc, a 1–1 draw at home and 0–0 away meant Sigma Olomouc progressed on the away goals rule. Sheriff finished the 1999–2000 season as runners-up in the league and quarter-finalist in the cup. The 2000–01 season was the beginning of FC Sheriff's dominance of the National Division, they won both the league and the cup to achieve their first double. FC Sheriff won the National Division championship in the next nine seasons, winning the 2006–07 season undefeated. During the nine seasons they also won the cup five times and qualified for the qualifying rounds of the UEFA Champions League each season.

The 2010–11 Moldovan National Division was won by FC Dacia Chișinău with Sheriff finishing in second place and qualifying for the Europa League qualifying phase. FC Sheriff won the next three league titles with no cup wins. FC Sheriff finished the 2014–15 Moldovan National Division in third place behind Milsami Orhei and Dacia Chișinău but won the cup thus still qualifying for the Europa League qualifying rounds. FC Sheriff resumed their dominance with three more league titles and a cup win.

The Moldovan Super Cup, a match between the winners of the National Division and the winners of the Moldovan Cup, was introduced in the 2003–04 season and is played at the beginning of each season. If one team has won both competitions it is not played, this has happened in four seasons and each time it is FC Sheriff who has won the double. Of the ten Super Cups played, FC Sheriff have won seven, been runners-up twice and did not qualify for the 2011 edition.

== Key ==
Key to competitions

- National = Moldovan National Division/Super Liga
- "A" = Moldovan "A" Division
- "B" (South) = Moldovan "B" Division (South group)
- UCL = UEFA Champions League
- UEL = UEFA Europa League
- UECL = UEFA Conference League
- UC = UEFA Cup

Key to positions and symbols

- 1st = Champions
- 2nd = Runners-up
- 3rd = Third place
- ↑ = Promoted

Key to rounds (Europe)

- QR = Qualifying round
- QR1 = First qualifying round, etc.
- PO = Play-off round
- GS = Group stage
- LP = League phase

== Seasons ==
Season	League record									Moldovan Cup	Super Cup	Europe		Top scorer(s)			
Season	Division	P	W	D	L	F	A	Pts	Pos	Moldovan Cup	Super Cup	Competition	Result	League	Goals	Total	Goals
1996–97	"B" (South) ↑	30	22	4	4	93	19	70	1st	Round of 32	—	—	—				
1997–98	"A" ↑	26	23	1	2	92	12	70	1st	Round of 16	—	—	—				
1998–99	National	26	9	10	7	39	24	37	4th	Winners	—	—	—	Serghei Rogaciov	21		
1999–2000	National	36	25	6	5	77	25	81	2nd	Quarter-finals	—	UC	QR	Serghei Rogaciov	20		
2000–01	National	28	21	4	3	58	18	67	1st	Winners	—	UC	QR	Davit Mujiri	17		
2001–02	National	28	20	7	1	62	18	67	1st	Winners	—	UCL	2Q	Ruslan Barburoș	17		
2002–03	National	24	19	3	2	64	15	60	1st	Semi-finals	—	UCL	2Q	Cristian Tudor	13		
2003–04	National	28	20	5	3	50	16	65	1st	Runners-up	Winners	UCL	2Q	Andriy Nesteruk	10		
2004–05	National	28	22	4	2	54	12	70	1st	Quarter-finals	Winners	UCL	2Q	Răzvan Cociș	12		
2005–06	National	28	22	5	1	57	11	71	1st	Winners	Winners	UCL	2Q	Aliaksei Kuchuk	13		
2006–07	National	36	28	8	0	70	7	92	1st	Semi-finals	Not held (Note: The Moldovan Super Cup was not played as Sheriff Tiraspol won both the National Division and Moldovan Cup in the previous season.)	UCL	2Q	Aliaksei Kuchuk	17		
2007–08	National	30	26	3	1	68	8	81	1st	Winners	Winners	UCL	2Q	Aliaksei Kuchuk	13		
2008–09	National	30	25	3	2	61	15	78	1st	Winners	Not held	UCL	2Q	Aleksandr Yerokhin	11	Aleksandr Yerokhin	12
2009–10	National	33	27	3	3	75	8	84	1st	Winners	Not held	UCL; UEL	PO; GS	Jymmy	13	Jymmy	18
2010–11	National	39	24	11	4	81	16	83	2nd	Semi-finals	Not held	UCL; UEL	PO; GS	Amath Diedhiou	13	Amath Diedhiou	14
2011–12	National	33	25	6	2	75	18	81	1st	Semi-finals	Did not qualify	UEL	2Q	Wilfried Balima	18	Wilfried Balima	18
2012–13	National	33	25	5	3	66	16	80	1st	Semi-finals	Runners-up	UCL; UEL	3Q; PO	Alexandru Pașcenco	9	Alexandru Pașcenco	9
2013–14	National	33	28	3	2	98	16	87	1st	Runners-up	Winners	UCL; UEL	3Q; GS	Henrique Luvannor	26	Henrique Luvannor	28
2014–15	National	24	17	4	3	56	16	55	3rd	Winners	Runners-up	UCL; UEL	3Q; PO	Ricardinho	19	Ricardinho	22
2015–16	National	27	20	5	2	50	11	65	1st	Semi-finals	Winners	UEL	1Q	Danijel Subotić	12	Danijel Subotić	12
2016–17	National	30	22	3	5	71	15	69	1st	Winners	Winners	UCL	2Q	Ricardinho	15	Ricardinho	16
2017	National	18	14	3	1	50	14	45	1st	Quarter-finals	Not held	UCL; UEL	3Q; GS	Vitalie Damașcan	13	Vitalie Damașcan	13
2018	National	28	19	6	3	58	14	63	1st	Winners	Not held	UCL; UEL	2Q; PO	Alhaji Kamara	9	Ziguy Badibanga	13
2019	National	28	22	4	2	60	9	70	1st	Semi-finals	Runners-up	UCL; UEL	1Q; 3Q	Yury Kendysh	13	Yury Kendysh	20
2020–21	National	36	32	3	1	116	7	99	1st	Runners-up	Not held	UCL; UEL	2Q; 3Q	Frank Castañeda	28	Frank Castañeda	33
2021–22	National	28	22	4	2	75	8	70	1st	Winners	Runners-up	UCL; UEL	GS; KPO	Momo Yansané	11	Adama Traoré	15
2022–23	National	24	17	6	1	39	9	57	1st	Winners	Not held	UCL; UEL; UECL	3Q; GS; R16	Rasheed Akanbi	8	Rasheed Akanbi	13
2023–24	National	24	16	4	4	51	16	52	2nd	Semi-finals	Not held	UCL; UEL	2Q; GS	Amine Talal	8	Amine Talal	11
2024–25	National	24	16	8	0	50	12	56	2nd	Winners	Not held	UEL; UECL	2Q; 3Q	Rasheed Akanbi	7	Rasheed Akanbi	14
2025–26	National	31	20	4	7	57	22	64	2nd	Winners	Not held	UEL; UECL	2Q; 3Q	Amarildo Gjoni	8	Amarildo Gjoni	9

== See also ==
- Moldovan football clubs in European competitions
