= Vazha Tarkhnishvili =

Georgian footballer (born 1971)

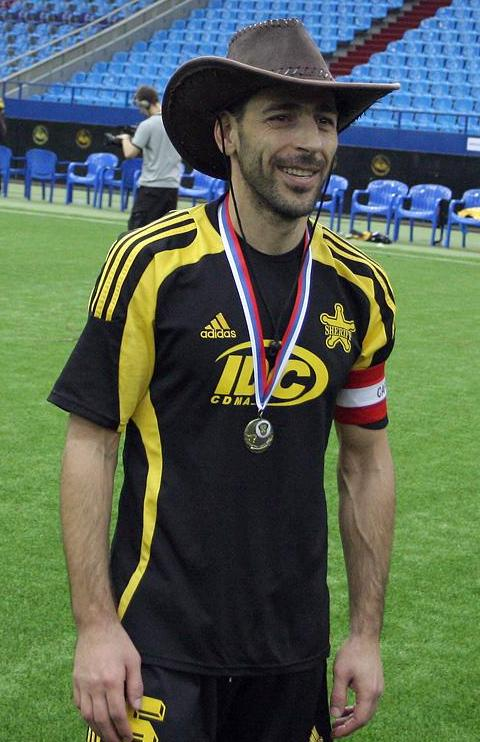
- Tarkhnishvili with Sheriff Tiraspol in 2009

Personal information
- Date of birth: 25 August 1971 (age 55)
- Place of birth: Gori, Georgian SSR, Soviet Union (now Georgia)
- Height: 1.76 m (5 ft 9 in)
- Position: Defender

Senior career*
Years	Team	Apps	(Gls)
1990	Kartli Gori	14	(1)
1991–1998	Dila Gori	211	(4)
1998–1999	Lokomotivi Tbilisi	14	(0)
1999–2012	Sheriff Tiraspol	443	(19)

International career
1998–1999	Georgia	2	(0)
- * Club domestic league appearances and goals

Vazha Tarkhnishvili (Georgian: ვაჟა თარხნიშვილი; born 25 August 1971) is a Georgian–Moldovan former professional footballer who played his last 13 years of activity as a defender for the Moldovan National Division club Sheriff Tiraspol. He was also capped twice for Georgia. In 2006 Tarkhnishvili was granted Moldovan citizenship.

== Honours ==
- Divizia Naţională: 11

2000–01, 2001–02, 2002–03, 2003–04, 2004–05, 2005–06, 2006–07, 2007–08, 2008–09, 2009–10, 2011–12

- Moldovan Cup: 7

1998–99, 2000–01, 2001–02, 2005–06, 2007–08, 2008–09, 2009–10

- Moldovan Super Cup: 4

2003, 2004, 2005, 2007

- CIS Cup: 2

2003, 2009
