= Oleh Humenyuk =

Ukrainian footballer

Personal information
- Full name: Oleh Humenyuk
- Date of birth: 3 May 1983 (age 43)
- Place of birth: Odesa, Ukrainian SSR
- Height: 1.78 m (5 ft 10 in)
- Position: Midfielder

Senior career*
Years	Team	Apps	(Gls)
2001–2007	Sheriff Tiraspol	193	(12)
2007–2009	Chornomorets Odesa	11	(0)
2010	Bastion Illichivsk	8	(2)
2010–2014	Tavriya Simferopol	79	(5)
2014–2016	Volyn Lutsk	28	(0)
2016–2017	TSK-Tavriya Simferopol	?	(?)
2017	Zaria Bălți	14	(1)
2018	Zhemchuzhyna Odesa	6	(0)

International career^{‡}
2003–2005	Ukraine U-21	10	(0)
- * Club domestic league appearances and goals as of 4 May 2018 ‡ National team caps and goals as of 4 May 2018

Oleh Humenyuk (Ukrainian: Олег Анатолійович Гуменюк; born 3 May 1983, Odesa, Ukrainian SSR) is a professional Ukrainian football midfielder who played for Zhemchuzhyna Odesa.

== Career ==
Humenyuk moved to Chornomorets in October 2007 from FC Sheriff Tiraspol. With Sheriff, Humenyuk won the Divizia Naţională championship five times, Moldovan Cup 3 times, and the Moldovan Super Cup 3 times. He appeared for Sheriff 193 times and scored 12 goals. He was also capped 10 times by the Ukraine U-21 team.

He played for Volyn Lutsk in the Ukrainian Premier League.

== Honours ==
Sheriff Tiraspol

- Moldovan National Division: (6) 2001–02, 2002–03, 2003–04, 2004–05, 2005–06, 2006–07
- Moldovan Cup: (2) 2001–02, 2005–06
- Moldovan Super Cup: (3) 2003, 2004, 2005
- CIS Cup: (1) 2003

Individual

- Top Scorer of Moldovan Super Cup
