= Oleg Ichim =

Moldovan footballer

Personal information
- Date of birth: 27 October 1979 (age 47)
- Place of birth: Tiraspol, Moldovan SSR
- Height: 1.79 m (5 ft 10 1/2 in)
- Position: Defender

Senior career*
Years	Team	Apps	(Gls)
1999–2000	Sheriff Tiraspol	2	(0)
2001	Haiduc-Sporting-USM Chişinău	7	(1)
2001–2002	Sheriff Tiraspol	7	(0)
2002–2004	Tiraspol	30	(2)
2004–2006	Dinamo Bender	46	(15)
2006–2007	Tiligul-Tiras Tiraspol	17	(0)
2007–2010	Neman Grodno	91	(1)
2010	Dinamo Bender	7	(1)
2011	Partizan Minsk	12	(0)
2012–2014	Olimpia Elbląg	77	(4)

International career
2010	Moldova	1	(0)
- * Club domestic league appearances and goals

Oleg Ichim (born 27 October 1979) is a Moldovan former professional footballer who played as a defender.

== Honours ==
Sheriff Tiraspol

- Moldovan National Division: 2001–02
- Moldovan Cup: 2001–02
