= 2001–02 Moldovan "A" Division =

Moldovan "A" Division
- Season: 2001–02
- Champions: Dacia Chișinău
- Promoted: Dacia Chișinău; Politehnica Chișinău
- Relegated: ULIM Chișinău

The 2001–02 Moldovan "A" Division season is the 11th since its establishment. A total of 16 teams are contesting the league.

== League table ==
Pos	Team	Pld	W	D	L	GF	GA	GD	Pts	Promotion, qualification or relegation
1	Dacia Chișinău (C, P)	30	23	6	1	69	13	+56	75	Promotion to Divizia Națională
2	Politehnica Chișinău (Note: Haiduc-Sporting-USM renamed Politehnic and moved from Hincesti to Chisinau) (O, P)	30	18	6	6	54	32	+22	60 (Note: Play in Codru)	Qualification for the promotion play-off
3	Sheriff-2 Tiraspol	30	17	5	8	46	28	+18	56 (Note: Play in Cioburciu)	Ineligible for promotion
4	Zimbru-2 Chișinău	30	16	5	9	50	34	+16	53	Ineligible for promotion
5	Olimpia Bălți	30	15	8	7	60	45	+15	53	
6	Fortuna Edineț	30	16	4	10	50	37	+13	52	
7	Cimentul Rîbnița	30	14	1	15	41	38	+3	43	
8	Unisport-Auto Chișinău	30	12	7	11	48	47	+1	43	
9	Congaz	30	10	8	12	38	48	−10	38	withdrew
10	Trachia Taraclia	30	10	7	13	31	41	−10	37	
11	CSA Buiucani Chișinău	30	10	4	16	50	53	−3	34	
12	Dinamo Bender	30	9	5	16	30	46	−16	32	
13	Universitatea Comrat (Note: Roma Balti went bankrupt. Their berth was bought by Universitatea Comrat.)	30	7	6	17	26	56	−30	27	
14	Haiduc-Unisport Hîncești (Note: Intersport renamed Haiduc-Unisport and moved from Chisinau to Hincesti)	30	7	5	18	31	55	−24	26	withdrew
15	Energhetic Dubăsari (Note: Energhetic Dubăsari were spared from relegation as Happy End Camenca, who were relegated from the 2001–02 Moldovan National Division, withdrew.)	30	6	7	17	20	43	−23	25	
16	ULIM Chișinău (R)	30	5	6	19	26	54	−28	21	Relegation to Divizia B

Source: RSSSF
(C) Champions; (O) Play-off winners; (P) Promoted; (R) Relegated
