= Vitali Maevici =

Moldovan footballer

Personal information
- Date of birth: 3 February 1976 (age 50)
- Place of birth: Ukrainian SSR
- Height: 1.79 m (5 ft 10 in)
- Position: Defender

Senior career*
Years	Team	Apps	(Gls)
1994–1995	FC Sokil Zolochiv		
1995–1997	FC Nistru Otaci	51	(3)
1998–1999	FC Sheriff Tiraspol		
1999	FC Uralan Elista	5	(0)
2000–2001	FC Alania Vladikavkaz	5	(0)
2001–2003	FC Nistru Otaci	11	(0)
2003–2004	FC Haray Zhovkva		
2006	FC Karpaty Kamianka-Buzka		
2007–2008	FC Halychyna Lviv		
2009	FC Karpaty Kamianka-Buzka		

International career
1998–2001	Moldova	5	(0)
- * Club domestic league appearances and goals

Vitali Maevici (born 3 February 1976 in the Ukrainian SSR) is a former Moldovan football player.

== Honours ==
Nistru Otaci

- Moldovan National Division runner-up: 2001–02
- Moldovan National Division bronze: 2002–03
- Moldovan Cup runner-up: 1996–97, 2001–02, 2002–03

Sheriff Tiraspol

- Moldovan National Division runner-up: 1999–2000
- Moldovan Cup winner: 1999
