= Anatolie Doroș =

Moldovan footballer

Personal information
- Date of birth: 21 March 1983 (age 43)
- Place of birth: Vertiujeni, Moldavian SSR
- Height: 1.84 m (6 ft 1/2 in)
- Position: Forward

Senior career*
| Years | Team | Apps | (Gls) |
| 2001–2003 | Hîncești | 25 | (4) |
| 2003–2004 | Nistru Otaci | 31 | (9) |
| 2004 | Legia Warsaw | 2 | (0) |
| 2005 | Polonia Warsaw | 7 | (0) |
| 2005–2006 | Korona Kielce | 1 | (1) |
| 2006–2007 | Araz Imisli | 24 | (8) |
| 2007–2008 | Standard Baku | 11 | (4) |
| 2008 | Volga Ulyanovsk | 15 | (2) |
| 2008–2009 | Karvan | 16 | (6) |
| 2009–2010 | Olimpik Baku | 28 | (12) |
| 2010 | Chornomorets Odesa | 17 | (3) |
| 2011 | Irtysh | 15 | (4) |
| 2011 | Astana | 13 | (0) |
| 2012 | Simurq | 14 | (2) |
| 2012–2013 | Rapid Chișinău | 28 | (10) |
| 2013 | Veris Chișinău | 5 | (2) |
| 2013–2014 | Rapid Chișinău | 14 | (5) |
| 2014–2015 | Petrocub | | |
| Total | | 266 | (72) |

International career
| | Moldova U21 | 8 | (2) |
| 2007–2013 | Moldova | 28 | (3) |
- * Club domestic league appearances and goals

Anatolie Doroș (born 21 March 1983) is a Moldovan former professional footballer who played as a striker.

== Career ==
During the 2012 Azerbaijani winter transfer window, Doroș joined Simurq on a contract till the end of the season, with an option of an extension.

== Career statistics ==
As of 18 March 2014

| Club performance | | | League | | Cup | | Continental | | Total | |
| Season | Club | League | Apps | Goals | Apps | Goals | Apps | Goals | Apps | Goals |
| Moldova | | | League | | Moldovan Cup | | Europe | | Total | |
|---|---|---|---|---|---|---|---|---|---|---|
| 2001–02 | FC Hîncești | Moldovan National Division | 12 | 3 | | | - | | 12 | 3 |
| 2002–03 | FC Hîncești | Moldovan National Division | 13 | 1 | | | - | | 13 | 1 |
| 2002–03 | Nistru Otaci | Moldovan National Division | 12 | 2 | | | - | | 12 | 2 |
| 2003–04 | Nistru Otaci | Moldovan National Division | 19 | 7 | | | - | | 19 | 17 |
| Poland | | | League | | Polish Cup | | Europe | | Total | |
| 2004–05 | Legia Warsaw | Ekstraklasa | 2 | 7 | | | - | | 2 | 0 |
| 2004–05 | Polonia Warsaw | Ekstraklasa | 7 | 0 | | | - | | 7 | 0 |
| 2005–06 | Korona Kielce | Ekstraklasa | 1 | 1 | | | - | | 1 | 1 |
| Azerbaijan | | | League | | Azerbaijan Cup | | Europe | | Total | |
| 2006–07 | MKT Araz Imisli | Azerbaijan Premier League | 22 | 8 | | | - | | 22 | 8 |
| 2007–08 | MKT Araz Imisli | Azerbaijan Premier League | 2 | 0 | | | - | | 2 | 0 |
| 2007–08 | Standard Baku | Azerbaijan Premier League | 11 | 4 | | | - | | 11 | 4 |
| Russia | | | League | | Russian Cup | | Europe | | Total | |
| 2008 | Volga Ulyanovsk | Russian First Division | 15 | 2 | | | - | | 15 | 2 |
| Azerbaijan | | | League | | Azerbaijan Cup | | Europe | | Total | |
| 2008–09 | FK Karvan | Azerbaijan Premier League | 16 | 6 | | | - | | 16 | 6 |
| 2009–10 | Olimpik Baku | Azerbaijan Premier League | 28 | 12 | 3 | 0 | - | | 31 | 12 |
| Ukraine | | | League | | Ukrainian Cup | | Europe | | Total | |
| 2010–11 | Chornomorets Odesa | Ukrainian First League | 17 | 3 | 1 | 0 | - | | 18 | 3 |
| Kazakhstan | | | League | | Kazakhstan Cup | | Europe | | Total | |
| 2011 | Irtysh | Kazakhstan Premier League | 15 | 4 | 2 | 3 | - | | 17 | 7 |
| 2011 | Astana | Kazakhstan Premier League | 13 | 0 | 0 | 0 | - | | 13 | 0 |
| Azerbaijan | | | League | | Azerbaijan Cup | | Europe | | Total | |
| 2011–12 | Simurq | Azerbaijan Premier League | 14 | 0 | 0 | 0 | - | | 14 | 2 |
| Moldova | | | League | | Moldovan Cup | | Europe | | Total | |
| 2012–13 | Rapid Chișinău | Moldovan National Division | 28 | 10 | | | - | | 28 | 10 |
| 2013–14 | FC Veris | Moldovan National Division | 5 | 2 | | | - | | 5 | 2 |
| 2013–14 | Rapid Chișinău | Moldovan National Division | 14 | 5 | | | - | | 14 | 5 |
| Total | Moldova | | 100 | 30 | | | - | | 100 | 30 |
| Total | Poland | | 10 | 1 | | | - | | 10 | 1 |
| Total | Azerbaijan | | 93 | 30 | | | - | | 93 | 30 |
| Total | Russia | | 15 | 2 | 0 | 0 | - | | 15 | 2 |
| Total | Ukraine | | 17 | 3 | 1 | 0 | - | | 18 | 3 |
| Total | Kazakhstan | | 28 | 4 | 2 | 3 | - | | 30 | 7 |
| Career total | | | 263 | 70 | | | - | | 263 | 70 |

== International goals ==
| # | Date | Venue | Opponent | Score | Result | Competition |
|---|---|---|---|---|---|---|
| 1 | 3 September 2010 | Chișinău, Moldova | Finland | 2-0 | 2–0 | UEFA Euro 2012 qualifying |
| 2 | 12 October 2010 | Serravalle, San Marino | San Marino | 2-0 | 2–0 | UEFA Euro 2012 qualifying |
| 3 | 6 February 2013 | Antalya, Turkey | Kazakhstan | 1-2 | 1–3 | International Friendly |
