= 2000–01 Moldovan Cup =

Cupa Moldovei

Tournament details
- Country: Moldova

Final positions
- Champions: Sheriff
- Runners-up: Nistru

The 2000–01 Moldovan Cup was the tenth edition of the Moldovan annual football tournament.

== Round of 16 ==
The first legs were played on 24 October 2000. The second legs were played on 8 November 2000.

Team 1	Agg.	Team 2	1st leg	2nd leg
Agro Chișinău	1–2	Happy End Camenca	1–1	0–1
Unisport-Auto Chișinău	2–5	Zimbru Chișinău	2–3	0–2
Sheriff Tiraspol	7–1	Universitatea Tehnica	4–1	3–0
Energhetic Dubăsari	0–3	Tiligul Tiraspol	0–2	0–1
Olimpia Bălți	3–1	Fortuna Edinet	1–1	2–0
FC Haiduc-Sporting USM	6–2	Petrocub-Condor	3–0	3–2
Nistru Otaci	6–1	Maik Chirsova	4–1	2-0
Cimentul Rîbnita	w/o	Constructorul Chişinău		

== Quarterfinals ==
The first legs were played on 14 March 2001. The second legs were played on 4 April 2001.

Team 1	Agg.	Team 2	1st leg	2nd leg
Zimbru Chișinău	5–2	Olimpia Bălți	3–0	2–2
Sheriff Tiraspol	4–0	Happy End Camenca	3–0	1–0
FC Haiduc-Sporting USM	0–1	Nistru Otaci	0–0	0–1
Tiligul Tiraspol	1–2	Constructorul Chişinău	1–1	0–1

== Semifinals ==
The first legs were played on 18 April 2001. The second legs were played on 2 May 2001.

Team 1	Agg.	Team 2	1st leg	2nd leg
Zimbru Chișinău	0–1	Sheriff Tiraspol	0–1	0–0
Constructorul Chişinău	2–2	Nistru Otaci	2–2	0–0

== Final ==
23 May 2001

Sheriff Tiraspol	0–0 (a.e.t.)	Nistru Otaci
	Report
Penalties
Mujiri (penalty scored); Bugneac (penalty scored); Bukel (penalty scored); Barburoș (penalty scored); Tarkhnishvili (penalty scored)	5–4	(penalty scored) Covalcov; (penalty scored) Lașcencov; (penalty scored) Lupaşcu; (penalty scored) Copisteanschi; (penalty missed) Groşev

Stadionul Republican, Chișinău
Attendance: 8,000
Referee: Tudor Cepoi
