= 2003–04 Moldovan "A" Division =

Moldovan "A" Division
- Season: 2003–04
- Champions: Steaua Chișinău
- Promoted: Steaua Chișinău
- Relegated: Locomotiva Basarabeasca; Maiac Chirsova

The 2003–04 Moldovan "A" Division season is the 13th since its establishment. A total of 16 teams are contesting the league.

== League table ==
Pos	Team	Pld	W	D	L	GF	GA	GD	Pts	Promotion or relegation
1	Steaua Chișinău (C, P)	30	20	7	3	75	22	+53	67	Promotion to Divizia Națională
2	Politehnica Chișinău	30	19	5	6	68	17	+51	62	Qualification for the promotion play-off
3	Sheriff-2 Tiraspol	30	19	4	7	72	26	+46	61	Ineligible for promotion
4	FCA Victoria Chișinău	30	16	9	5	67	23	+44	57	
5	Dinamo Bender	30	15	7	8	50	24	+26	52	
6	Roso Floreni	30	17	1	12	51	38	+13	52	
7	Zimbru-2 Chișinău	30	14	8	8	48	26	+22	50	Ineligible for promotion
8	Olimpia Bălți	30	15	5	10	55	31	+24	50	
9	Nistru-2 Edineț (Note: Nistru-2 relocated from Otaci to Edineț ahead of the season.)	30	14	8	8	35	20	+15	49 (Note: Nistru-2 have been deducted 1 point.)	Ineligible for promotion
10	USC Gagauziya (Note: Universitet Comrat changed their name to USC Gagauzia ahead of the season.)	30	9	8	13	36	38	−2	35	
11	Grigoriopol	30	9	7	14	37	45	−8	34	withdrew
12	Energhetic Dubăsari	30	9	5	16	31	53	−22	32	
13	Orhei	30	10	2	18	26	59	−33	32	
14	Iskra-Stal Rîbnița	30	7	7	16	31	62	−31	28	
15	Locomotiva Basarabeasca (R)	30	5	1	24	19	98	−79	16	Relegation to Divizia B
16	Maiac Chirsova (R)	30	0	0	30	5	124	−119	0	Relegation to Divizia B

Source: RSSSF
(C) Champions; (P) Promoted; (R) Relegated
