= Cătălin Mulțescu =

Romanian footballer

Personal information
- Full name: Cătălin Emanuel Mulțescu
- Date of birth: 26 April 1976 (age 50)
- Place of birth: Petroșani, Romania
- Height: 1.80 m (5 ft 11 in)
- Position: Goalkeeper

Youth career
- 1988–1994: Rocar București

Senior career*
Years	Team	Apps	(Gls)
1994–1995	Rocar București	24	(0)
1996	Steaua Mizil	6	(0)
1996–1997	Rocar București	25	(0)
1997–2002	Astra Ploiești	132	(0)
2002–2004	Zimbru Chișinău	33	(0)
2004	Ceahlăul Piatra-Neamț	0	(0)
2005	Jiul Petroșani	11	(0)
2006	Petrolul Ploiești	11	(0)
2006	Jiul Petroșani	11	(0)
2007–2008	Ceahlăul Piatra-Neamț	31	(0)
Total		284	(0)

Managerial career
- 2012–2013: Sportul Studențesc (GK coach)
- 2013: Sportul Studențesc (caretaker)
- 2013: Dinamo București (GK coach)
- 2014: Petrolul Ploiești (GK coach)
- 2015–2016: Voluntari (GK coach)
- 2016–2017: Universitatea Craiova (GK coach)
- 2019: Petrolul Ploiești (GK coach)
- 2020: Dinamo București (GK coach)
- 2020–2021: Dinamo București (GK coach)
- 2021–2022: Enosis Neon Paralimni (GK coach)
- 2024–2026: CS Dinamo București (GK coach)
- * Club domestic league appearances and goals

Cătălin Emanuel Mulțescu (born 26 April 1976) is a Romanian former professional footballer who played as a goalkeeper.

== Personal life ==
He's the son of former international player and coach Gheorghe Mulțescu.

== Honours ==
Astra Ploiești

- Divizia B: 1997–98

Jiul Petroșani

- Divizia B: 2004–05

Zimbru Chișinău

- Cupa Moldovei: 2002–03, 2003–04
- Supercupa Moldovei runner-up: 2003
