= 1999–2000 Moldovan Cup =

Cupa Moldovei

Tournament details
- Country: Moldova

Final positions
- Champions: Constructorul
- Runners-up: Zimbru

The 1999–2000 Moldovan Cup was the ninth season of the Moldovan annual football cup competition. The competition ended with the final held on 24 May 2000.

== Round of 16 ==
The first legs were played on 20 October 1999. The second legs were played on 3 November 1999.

Team 1	Agg.	Team 2	1st leg	2nd leg
Constructorul	10–1	Intersport	9–1	1–0
Tiligul	3–2	Haiduc-Sporting	1–2	2–0
Energhetic	2–7	Olimpia	0–2	2–5
Agro	1–1 (a)	Nistru-Unisport	1–1	0–0
Petrocub-Spicul	1–6	Zimbru	1–2	0–4
Moldova-Gaz	11–2	Chițcani	7–1	4–1
Unisport	2–1	Roma	1–1	1–0
Cimentul	1–12	Sheriff	0–3	1–9

== Quarter-finals ==
The first legs were played on 15 March 2000. The second legs were played on 5 April 2000.

Team 1	Agg.	Team 2	1st leg	2nd leg
Constructorul	3–2	Olimpia	3–0	0–2
Moldova-Gaz	1–1 (a)	Sheriff	0–0	1–1
Zimbru	10–0	Unisport	10–0	w/o
Nistru-Unisport	3–1	Tiligul	1–0	2–1

== Semi-finals ==
The first legs were played on 19 April 2000. The second legs were played on 3 May 2000.

Team 1	Agg.	Team 2	1st leg	2nd leg
Nistru-Unisport	1–4	Zimbru	0–3	1–1
Moldova-Gaz	1–6	Constructorul	1–2	0–4

== Final ==
24 May 2000

Constructorul	1–0	Zimbru
Boicenco 90'	Report

Stadionul Republican, Chișinău
Attendance: 7,500
Referee: Vladimir Antonov
