= Vasile Coșelev =

Moldovan footballer

Personal information
- Date of birth: 12 February 1972 (age 54)
- Place of birth: Chișinău, Moldavian SSR, Soviet Union
- Height: 1.97 m (6 ft 5 1/2 in)
- Position: Goalkeeper

Senior career*
Years	Team	Apps	(Gls)
1989	Nistru Chișinău	2	(0)
1989	RShVSM Bendery	1	(0)
1990	Nistru Chișinău	1	(0)
1990	Zaria Bălți	35	(0)
1991	Odesa	10	(0)
1992	Bugeac Comrat	21	(0)
1992–1994	Tiligul Tiraspol	41	(0)
1995–1996	Zimbru Chișinău	18	(0)
1996	Constructorul Chișinău	2	(0)
1997	Spumante Cricova	5	(0)
1998	Zimbru Chișinău	6	(0)
1999	Krylia Sovetov Samara	13	(0)
2000	Uralan Elista	21	(0)
2001	Sodovik Sterlitamak	16	(0)
2002	Dynamo Vologda	13	(0)
2003–2005	Lokomotiv Chita	68	(0)
2009–2010	CSCA-Rapid Chișinău	1	(0)

International career
1992–1999	Moldova	23	(0)
- * Club domestic league appearances and goals

Vasile Coșelev (born 12 February 1972) is a former Moldovan football player.

Between 1992–1999, Coșelev played 23 matches for the Moldova national football team.
