= 2002–03 Moldovan "A" Division =

Moldovan "A" Division
- Season: 2002–03
- Champions: Tiligul Tiraspol
- Promoted: Tiligul Tiraspol; Unisport-Auto Chișinău
- Relegated: Energhetic Dubăsari; Trachia Taraclia

The 2002–03 Moldovan "A" Division season is the 12th since its establishment. A total of 14 teams are contesting the league.

== League table ==
Pos	Team	Pld	W	D	L	GF	GA	GD	Pts	Promotion, qualification or relegation
1	Tiligul Tiraspol (C, P)	26	21	2	3	63	12	+51	65	Promotion to Divizia Națională
2	Zimbru-2 Chișinău	26	18	4	4	64	27	+37	58	Ineligible for promotion
3	Unisport-Auto Chișinău (O, P)	26	17	5	4	44	22	+22	56	Qualification for the promotion play-off
4	Olimpia Bălți	26	14	7	5	47	29	+18	49	
5	Iskra Rîbnița (Note: Cimentul (Rîbnita) changed their name into Iskra)	26	14	4	8	40	22	+18	46	
6	Sheriff-2 Tiraspol	26	11	8	7	33	17	+16	41	Ineligible for promotion
7	FCA Victoria Chișinău (Note: CSA Buyucan (Chisinau) changed their name into FCA Victoria)	26	11	5	10	33	34	−1	38	
8	Dinamo Bender	26	9	7	10	27	22	+5	34	
9	Nistru-2 Otaci (Note: Fortuna (Edinet) changed their name into Nistru-2)	26	9	5	12	28	33	−5	32	Ineligible for promotion
10	Orhei	26	6	6	14	28	49	−21	24	
11	Politehnica-2 Chișinău	26	5	5	16	19	43	−24	20	Ineligible for promotion
12	Universitatea Comrat	26	4	8	14	19	46	−27	20	
13	Energhetic Dubăsari (R)	26	4	6	16	22	48	−26	18 (Note: Happy End who were relegated from the 1st division gave their place in the 2nd division to Energetic who were officially relegated to the 3rd division.)	Relegation to Divizia B
14	Trachia Taraclia (R)	26	2	2	22	11	74	−63	8	Relegation to Divizia B

Source: RSSSF
(C) Champions; (O) Play-off winners; (P) Promoted; (R) Relegated
Notes:

Note: Congaz and Haiduc-Unisport withdrew because of financial problems.
