= 2004–05 Moldovan "A" Division =

Moldovan "A" Division
- Season: 2004–05
- Champions: Dinamo Bender
- Promoted: Dinamo Bender; Politehnica Chișinău

The 2004–05 Moldovan "A" Division season is the 14th since its establishment. A total of 16 teams are contesting the league.

== League table ==
Pos	Team	Pld	W	D	L	GF	GA	GD	Pts	Promotion or relegation
1	Dinamo Bender (C, P)	30	24	3	3	68	16	+52	75	Promotion to Divizia Națională
2	Politehnica Chișinău (O, P)	30	23	2	5	90	18	+72	71	Qualification for the promotion play-off
3	Olimpia Bălți	30	21	6	3	63	22	+41	69	
4	Sheriff-2 Tiraspol	30	19	8	3	76	22	+54	65	Ineligible for promotion
5	Roso Floreni	30	16	6	8	51	36	+15	54	
6	FCA Victoria Chișinău	30	11	11	8	39	31	+8	44	
7	Zimbru-2 Chișinău	30	11	10	9	48	36	+12	43	Ineligible for promotion
8	Tiligul-Tiras-2 Tiraspol	30	15	5	10	45	35	+10	40 (Note: Tiligul-Tiras-2 Tiraspol have been deducted 10 points.)	Ineligible for promotion
9	Iskra-Stal Rîbnița	30	9	9	12	27	40	−13	36	
10	Intersport-Aroma	30	10	5	15	27	41	−14	35	
11	USC Gagauziya	30	6	10	14	16	39	−23	28	
12	Orhei	30	7	6	17	24	70	−46	27	
13	Otaci (Note: Nistru-2 Edineț relocated from Edineț to Otaci and changed their name to FC Otaci ahead of the season.)	30	5	6	19	20	58	−38	21	
14	Steaua-2 Chișinău	30	4	8	18	18	56	−38	20	withdrew
15	Agro-Goliador Chișinău	30	5	2	23	17	56	−39	17	withdrew
16	Energhetic Dubăsari	30	4	3	23	17	70	−53	15	

Source: RSSSF
(C) Champions; (O) Play-off winners; (P) Promoted
