= 2004–05 Moldovan Cup =

Cupa Moldovei

Tournament details
- Country: Moldova

Final positions
- Champions: Nistru
- Runners-up: Dacia

The 2004–05 Moldovan Cup was the 14th season of the Moldovan annual football cup competition. The competition ended with the final held on 21 May 2005.

== Round of 16 ==
The first legs were played on 29 September 2004. The second legs were played on 20 October 2004.

Team 1	Agg.	Team 2	1st leg	2nd leg
FCA Victoria	1–4	Zimbru	0–0	1–4
Olimpia	1–4	Tiligul-Tiras	1–1	0–3
Nistru	7–2	Otaci	5–0	2–2
Petrocub	7–3	Steaua	1–1	6–2
Politehnica	6–2	Unisport-Auto	3–0	3–2
Tiraspol	5–0	Fortuna	5–0	0–0
Dacia	6–2	Cahul	4–2	2–0
Dinamo	1–3	Sheriff	1–2	0–1

== Quarter-finals ==
The first legs were played on 27 October 2004. The second legs were played on 10 November 2004.

Team 1	Agg.	Team 2	1st leg	2nd leg
Tiraspol	2–2 (a)	Politehnica	2–2	0–0
Dacia	1–0	Sheriff	1–0	0–0
Tiligul-Tiras	3–2	Zimbru	2–1	1–1
Petrocub	w/o	Nistru		

== Semi-finals ==
The first legs were played on 13 April 2005. The second legs were played on 28 April 2005.

Team 1	Agg.	Team 2	1st leg	2nd leg
Dacia	1–0	Politehnica	1–0	0–0
Tiligul-Tiras	1–1 (a)	Nistru	1–1	0–0

== Final ==
21 May 2005

Nistru	1–0	Dacia
Jarov 89'	Report

Stadionul Republican, Chișinău
Attendance: 5,000
Referee: Ghenadie Orlic
