= 1997–98 Moldovan Cup =

Cupa Moldovei

Tournament details
- Country: Moldova

Final positions
- Champions: Zimbru
- Runners-up: Constructorul

The 1997–98 Moldovan Cup was the seventh season of the Moldovan annual football cup competition. The competition ended with the final held on 27 May 1998.

== Round of 16 ==
The first legs were played on 7 March 1998. The second legs were played on 12 March 1998.

Team 1	Agg.	Team 2	1st leg	2nd leg
Sheriff	2–6	Zimbru	0–2	2–4
Constructorul	2–1	Olimpia	2–0	0–1
Raut	w/o	Roma		
Speranța	0–7	Moldova-Gaz	0–2	0–5
Unisport	2–6	Tiligul	0–3 (Note: Awarded)	2–3
Zimbru-2	0–2	Nistru	0–2	0–0
Locomotiva	4–4 (a)	Stimold	4–1	0–3
Energhetic	2–5	Dumbrava	0–3	2–2

== Quarter-finals ==
The first legs were played on 1 April 1998. The second legs were played on 15 April 1998.

Team 1	Agg.	Team 2	1st leg	2nd leg
Zimbru	2–1	Roma	1–0	1–1
Moldova-Gaz	0–2	Tiligul	0–1	0–1
Constructorul	16–1	Dumbrava	9–0	7–1
Nistru	8–0	Stimold	5–0	3–0

== Semi-finals ==
The first legs were played on 29 April 1998. The second legs were played on 13 May 1998.

Team 1	Agg.	Team 2	1st leg	2nd leg
Zimbru	7–0	Tiligul	4–0	3–0
Nistru	3–4	Constructorul	2–1	1–3

== Final ==
27 May 1998

Zimbru	1–0	Constructorul
Catînsus 29'	Report

Stadionul Republican, Chișinău
Attendance: 14,000
Referee: Andrei Iacovlev
