= 2002–03 Moldovan Cup =

Cupa Moldovei

Tournament details
- Country: Moldova

Final positions
- Champions: Zimbru
- Runners-up: Nistru

2002–03 Moldovan Cup was the 12th edition of the Moldovan annual football tournament.

== Round of 16 ==
The first legs were played on 4 September 2002. The second legs were played on 16 October 2002.

Team 1	Agg.	Team 2	1st leg	2nd leg
Zimbru Chişinău	13–0	Victoras Suruceni	7–0	6–0
Universitatea Comrat	2–7	Agro Chişinău	1–3	1–5
Unisport Chişinău	1–2	Nistru Otaci	1–0	0–2 (a.e.t.)
Hîncesti	3–1	Victoria Chişinău	3–0	1–1
Tiligul Tiraspol	0–8	Sheriff Tiraspol	0–6	0–2
Sculeni Prut	1–2	Dacia Chişinău	1–2	0–0
Fortuna Pleşeni	1–4	Politehnica Chişinău	1–4	w/o
Tiraspol	5–1	Rosso Floreni	5–1	w/o

== Quarterfinals ==
The first legs were played on 30 October 2002. The second legs were played on 13 November 2002.

Team 1	Agg.	Team 2	1st leg	2nd leg
Agro Chişinău	0–6	Zimbru Chişinău	0–3	0–3
Nistru Otaci	w/o	Hîncesti		
Dacia Chişinău	2–6	Sheriff Tiraspol	2–4	0–2
Tiraspol	3–1	Politehnica Chişinău	1–1	2–1

== Semifinals ==
The first legs were played on 19 March 2003. The second legs were played on 10 April 2003.

Team 1	Agg.	Team 2	1st leg	2nd leg
Sheriff Tiraspol	0–2	Zimbru Chişinău	0–1	0–1
Tiraspol	1–4	Nistru Otaci	1–2	0–2

== Final ==
21 May 2003

Zimbru Chişinău	0–0 (a.e.t.)	Nistru Otaci
	Report
Penalties
Baştină (penalty scored); Shishelov (penalty scored); Frunză (penalty scored); Cebotari (penalty scored)	4–2	(penalty scored) Bursuc; (penalty scored) Tcaciuc; (penalty missed) Lupaşcu; (penalty missed) Kovalkov

Republican, Chişinău
Attendance: 7,000
Referee: Vitalie Onică
