= 2003–04 Moldovan Cup =

Cupa Moldovei

Tournament details
- Country: Moldova

Final positions
- Champions: Zimbru
- Runners-up: Sheriff

The 2003–04 Moldovan Cup was the 13th season of the Moldovan annual football cup competition. The competition ended with the final held on 30 May 2004.

== Round of 16 ==
The first legs were played on 1 October 2003. The second legs were played on 22 October 2003.

Team 1	Agg.	Team 2	1st leg	2nd leg
Olimpia	0–6	Zimbru	0–4	0–2
Unisport-Auto	7–4	Roso	3–1	4–3
Dacia	11–0	Florești	9–0	2–0
Energhetic	1–2	Agro	0–1	1–1
Slobozia Mare	0–4	Nistru	0–4	w/o
Steaua	0–9	Sheriff	0–3	0–6
Tiraspol	12–1	FCA Victoria	7–0	5–1
Dinamo	3–2	Tiligul	2–1	1–1

== Quarter-finals ==
The first legs were played on 5 November 2003. The second legs were played on 13 November 2003.

Team 1	Agg.	Team 2	1st leg	2nd leg
Tiraspol	0–2	Zimbru	0–0	0–2
Dacia	2–0	Agro	1–0	1–0
Unisport-Auto	0–4	Sheriff	0–2	0–2
Dinamo	1–6	Nistru	0–3	1–3

== Semi-finals ==
The first legs were played on 4 April 2004. The second legs were played on 14 April 2004.

Team 1	Agg.	Team 2	1st leg	2nd leg
Dacia	1–2	Zimbru	0–1	1–1
Sheriff	4–2	Nistru	3–1	1–1

== Final ==
30 May 2004

Zimbru	2–1	Sheriff
Manoliu 1'; Franțuz 64'	Report	Kuznetsov 45+2'

Stadionul Republican, Chișinău
Attendance: 6,500
Referee: Valeriu Sorochin
