= FC Dacia Chișinău =

Association football club in Moldova

Dacia Chișinău
- Full name: Fotbal Club Dacia Chișinău
- Nicknames: Galben-albaștrii (The Yellow-Blues); Lupii (The Wolves)
- Founded: 1999; 27 years ago
- Dissolved: 2018; 8 years ago
- Ground: Stadionul Dacia
- Capacity: 8,550 (3,300 seats)
- 2017: Divizia Națională, 4th of 10 (withdrew)
Home colours	Away colours

Fotbal Club Dacia Chișinău, commonly known as Dacia Chișinău or simply Dacia, was a Moldovan football club based in Chișinău, which last played in the village of Speia, Anenii Noi. They participated in the Divizia Națională, the top division in Moldovan football.

The club's name came from Dacia, an ancient civilization which covered parts of modern Moldova. Established in 1999, it entered the Moldovan "A" Division in 2000 and was promoted to the first division two years later. They won their first league title in the 2010–11 season, thereby qualifying for the preliminaries of the UEFA Champions League. The team has also taken part in the Europa League on five occasions, but never reached the group stage. The club was disbanded after the 2017 Moldovan National Division season.

== History ==
=== Early history (1999–2002) ===
FC Dacia was founded in 1999 by Marin Livadaru, Igor Ursachi, Valeriu Plujnic and Alexandru Șcaruba. The team was composed of goalkeeper Ghenadie Gariuc and outfield players including Alexandru Golban, Cornel Popov, Ruslan Rașcu, Serghei Coșciug, Cornel Gafton, Veaceslav Titov, Alexandru Tracalov. The club's initial aim was to compete in the Moldovan "A" Division (second tier). Dacia debuted in this league during the 2000–01 season, while Gabriel Stati took over as president in autumn 2000. The club came 4th in its first season before being promoted to the top-flight Moldovan National Division the following season.

=== National Division (2002–2010) ===
Dacia won their first National Division match 1–0 against Nistru Otaci, and ended the 2002–03 season in 4th with qualification to the Intertoto Cup as a result. Here they defeated the Faeroese club GÍ Gøta and Albanian side Partizani Tirana, against whom they five unanswered goals over the two-legged fixture (2–0 and 3–0). Dacia were subsequently eliminated by Germans Schalke 04, losing both legs (1–0 and 2–1).

Before the 2003–04 season, former Dacia player and second-team coach Emil Caras took over as head coach, leading the side to 5th place in the league and a Moldovan Cup semi-final defeat against fellow Chișinău-based side Zimbru Chișinău. Durfing that cup-run, Dacia recorded the largest victory in its history, 9–0 against FC Florești.

The 2004–05 season saw Dacia qualify for the UEFA Cup for the first time after a third-place finish in the league. The Wolves also finished as runners-up in the Moldova Cup after a dramatic loss to Nistru Otaci. Dacia were knocked out of the 2005-06 UEFA Cup in the first round against the Swiss Challenge League team FC Vaduz, losing 2–0 away but winning the home leg 1–0 though Vladimir Jăpălău. The subsequent league campaign ended in sixth position, along with defeat in the Moldova Cup semi-finals against Nistru Otaci. However, Dacia was the winner of a friendly tournament named the Turkmenistan President's Cup in February 2006, winning 4–3 in the final and collecting $20,000 US dollars as a prize.

After finishing 4th in the 2006–07 season, Dacia qualified for the 2007 Intertoto Cup, and advanced past the Azerbaijani club Baku FC in the first round via a penalty shoot-out, with Dacia's goalkeeper Mihai Moraru saving. It took another shoot-out in the second round to defeat Swiss club St Gallen. Dacia's third-round opponents were German club Hamburger SV, whose team of internationals revolving around Dutch playmaker Rafael van der Vaart drew 1–1 in Moldova, but won 4–0 in the return leg to knock Dacia out. The Yellow Wolves received a high assessment from local experts and Dacia were named the Top Team of 2007 by the Moldova Football Association.

The subsequent 2007–08 league campaign brought Dacia's highest-placed finish as of then, partly due to new vice-president Timur Kuriev who found Russian investors. After the mid-season break, Dacia won five matches in a row to cut their deficit behind holders and league leaders Sheriff Tiraspol to a single point before their encounter on 30 March, which was won by Sheriff. By finishing in second, Dacia made the qualifying rounds of the UEFA Cup and were defeated 4–2 on aggregate by Serbian club Borac Čačak in the first round.

Dacia finished as runners-up to Sheriff again in 2008–09, and also reached their second Moldovan Cup final, which they lost 2–0 to Sheriff on 23 May. During the season, manager Emil Caras moved to FC Tiraspol and was replaced by the Ukrainian Roman Pilipchuk, while at the end of the season Victor Bulat received the People's Choice Award. Dacia started the 2009–10 UEFA Europa League in the second qualifying round where they were defeated 3–0 on aggregate by Slovak team MŠK Žilina.

In the 2009–10 season, Dacia were in the third place over the mid-season break, two points off first, but ended the season in 5th. Pilipchuk was replaced as manager by Veaceslav Semionov, and Rustam Polonkoev took over as president. The team made the Moldovan Cup final for the second consecutive season, and were again defeated 2–0 by Sheriff Tiraspol.

=== League success (2010–2018) ===
Dacia began the 2010–11 season in a Europa League qualifier against Montenegrin club FK Zeta, winning on the away-goals rule after a 1–1 aggregate draw, and were then knocked out 2–0 on aggregate by Swedish team Kalmar FF. The Russian coach Igor Dobrovolskiy was appointed as head coach of Dacia before the league season began. Dacia were the sole unbeaten side in the league by their 17th match, which they lost 3–0 to Sheriff Tiraspol. Following that result, they remained unbeaten for the remaining 22 league games of the season. Dacia won their first, and so far only, Moldovan National Division title in 2010–11, finishing 9 points ahead of runners-up Sheriff and denying the Tiraspol club an eleventh consecutive title.

Also that season, Dacia signed an agreement with the Buiucani sports school to create a reserve team, Dacia Buiucani.

Before the 2011–12 season, Dacia won the revived Moldovan Super Cup against Iskra-Stal Rîbnița, with the only goal of the game coming from new signing Vasili Pavlov. In July 2011, Dacia made their UEFA Champions League debut in the second qualifying round, against Georgian champions Zestaponi. Despite winning the home leg 2–0, Dacia lost 3–0 in the return leg and were eliminated. Dobrovolski was replaced with Igor Negrescu during the league season, and Dacia finished as runners-up as Sheriff regained their title.

Dacia entered the 2012–13 UEFA Europa League in the first qualifying round, where they beat Slovenians Celje 1–0 in each leg. In the second qualifying round, against IF Elfsborg of Sweden, Dacia won the first leg 1–0 before losing the second 2–0 away and were subsequently eliminated.

On 13 March 2018, Dacia announced that they would not be participating in the 2018 Moldovan National Division.

== Club rivalries ==
Dacia's local rival has always been FC Zimbru Chișinău.

== Statistics ==
=== Domestic ===
Season	League									Moldovan Cup	Europe		Top goalscorer	
Season	Div.	Pos.	Pl.	W	D	L	GS	GA	P	Moldovan Cup	Europe		Name	League
2000–01	Divizia "A"	4	30	16	8	6	45	20	56		—			
2001–02	Divizia "A"	1	30	23	6	1	69	13	75	Round of 16	—			
2002–03	Divizia Națională	4	28	8	8	8	24	28	32	Quarter-finals	—			
2003–04	Divizia Națională	5	24	9	8	11	26	28	35	Semi-finals	IC	3rd round		
2004–05	Divizia Națională	3	28	14	3	11	38	31	45	Runners-up	—		(Moldova) Serghei Jăpălău	10
2005–06	Divizia Națională	6	28	7	9	12	28	39	30	Semi-finals	UC	1st round		
2006–07	Divizia Națională	4	36	13	16	7	36	30	55	Quarter-finals	—			
2007–08	Divizia Națională	2	30	19	5	6	60	28	62	Quarter-finals	IC	3rd round	(Georgia (country)) Djaba Dvali	13
2008–09	Divizia Națională	2	30	20	3	7	47	17	63	Runners-up	UC	1st round	(Moldova) Ghenadie Orbu	8
2009–10	Divizia Națională	5	33	16	10	7	54	30	58	Runners-up	EL	2nd round	(Ukraine) Oleksandr Zgura	12
2010–11	Divizia Națională	1	39	27	11	1	66	16	92	Semi-finals	EL	2nd round	(Moldova) Ghenadie Orbu	22
2011–12	Divizia Națională	2	33	24	5	4	63	17	77	Semi-finals	UCL	2nd round	(Russia) Vasily Pavlov	12
2012–13	Divizia Națională	2	33	18	12	3	47	19	66	Quarter-finals	EL	2nd round	(Moldova) Ghenadie Orbu	9
2013–14	Divizia Națională	5	33	18	7	8	68	29	61	Semi-finals	EL	2nd round	(Montenegro) Miloš Krkotić	14
2014–15	Divizia Națională	2	24	17	4	3	48	13	55	Runners-up	—		(Moldova) Petru Leucă	11
2015–16	Divizia Națională	2	27	20	5	2	44	12	65	Semi-finals	EL	2nd round	(Ukraine) Serhiy Zahynaylov	11
2016–17	Divizia Națională	2	30	22	3	5	54	15	69	Quarter-finals	EL	1st round	(Ukraine) Maksym Feshchuk (Bulgaria) Georgi Sarmov	7; 7
2017	Divizia Națională	4	18	7	5	6	23	26	26	Quarter-finals	EL	1st round	(Moldova) Alexandru Pașcenco (Serbia) Bratislav Punoševac	4; 4

=== European ===
As of match played 6 July 2017

Competition	Pld	W	D	L	GF	GA	GD
UEFA Champions League	2	1	0	1	2	3	–1
UEFA Cup/Europa League	26	8	5	13	20	35	-15
UEFA Intertoto Cup	12	5	3	4	15	12	+3
Total	40	14	8	18	37	50	-13

Season	Competition	Round	Club	Home	Away	Aggregate
2003	UEFA Intertoto Cup	1R	(Faroe Islands) GÍ	1–0	4–1	5–1
2003	UEFA Intertoto Cup	2R	(Albania) Partizani Tirana	2–0	3–0	5–0
2003	UEFA Intertoto Cup	3R	(Germany) Schalke 04	1–2	0–1	1–3
2005–06	UEFA Cup	1QR	(Liechtenstein) Vaduz	1–0	0–2	1–2
2007	UEFA Intertoto Cup	1R	(Azerbaijan) Baku	1–1	1–1	2–2 (3–1 p)
2007	UEFA Intertoto Cup	2R	(Switzerland) St. Gallen	0–1	1–0	1–1 (3–0 p)
2007	UEFA Intertoto Cup	3R	(Germany) Hamburg	1–1	0–4	1–5
2008–09	UEFA Cup	1QR	(Serbia) Borac Čačak	1–1	1–3	2–4
2009–10	UEFA Europa League	2QR	(Slovakia) MŠK Žilina	0–1	0–3	0–4
2010–11	UEFA Europa League	1QR	(Montenegro) Zeta	0–0	1–1	1–1 (a)
2010–11	UEFA Europa League	2QR	(Sweden) Kalmar	0–2	0–0	0–2
2011–12	UEFA Champions League	2QR	(Georgia (country)) Zestaponi	2–0	0–3	2–3
2012–13	UEFA Europa League	1QR	(Slovenia) Celje	1–0	1–0	2–0
2012–13	UEFA Europa League	2QR	(Sweden) Elfsborg	1–0	0–2	1–2
2013–14	UEFA Europa League	1QR	(Albania) Teuta Durrës	2–0	1–3	3–3 (a)
2013–14	UEFA Europa League	2QR	(Ukraine) Chornomorets Odesa	2–1	0–2	2–3
2015–16	UEFA Europa League	1QR	(North Macedonia) Renova	4–1	1–0	5–1
2015–16	UEFA Europa League	2QR	(Slovakia) MŠK Žilina	1–2	2–4	3–6
2016–17	UEFA Europa League	1QR	(Azerbaijan) Kapaz	0–1	0–0	0–1
2017–18	UEFA Europa League	1QR	(North Macedonia) Shkëndija	0–4	0–3	0–7

== Honours ==
=== Leagues ===
- Divizia Națională
  - Winners (1): 2010–11
  - Runners-up (7): 2007–08, 2008–09, 2011–12, 2012–13, 2014–15, 2015–16, 2016–17
- Divizia A
  - Winners (1): 2001–02

=== Cups ===
- Cupa Moldovei
  - Runners-up (4): 2004–05, 2008–09, 2009–10, 2014–15
- Supercupa Moldovei
  - Winners (1): 2011

== Managers ==
- (Moldova) Igor Ursachi (1999–2003)
- (Moldova) Emil Caras (2003 – 3 May 2008)
- (Moldova) Vasile Coșelev (caretaker) (3 May 2008 – 2 October 2008)
- (Ukraine) Roman Pylypchuk (2 October 2008 – 31 August 2009)
- (Moldova) Sergiu Botnaraș (caretaker) (1 September 2009 – 10 December 2009)
- (Moldova) Veaceslav Semionov (caretaker) (23 December 2009 – 5 July 2010)
- (Russia) Igor Dobrovolski (5 July 2010 – 7 May 2012)
- (Moldova) Igor Negrescu (caretaker) (7 May 2012 – 4 June 2012)
- (Russia) Igor Dobrovolski (4 June 2012 – 8 June 2013)
- (Moldova) Igor Negrescu (8 June 2013 – 9 January 2014)
- (Montenegro) Dejan Vukićević (9 January 2014 – 2 November 2014)
- (Moldova) Veaceslav Semionov (caretaker) (2 November 2014 – 20 January 2015)
- (Belarus) Oleg Kubarev (20 January 2015 – 9 March 2015)
- (Moldova) Veaceslav Semionov (caretaker) (9 March 2015 – 26 April 2015)
- (Russia) Igor Dobrovolski (26 April 2015 – 4 August 2015)
- (Ukraine) Oleg Valeriyovych Bezhenar (4 August 2015 – 2017)

=== Chairman ===
Name	Year's Activity
Gabriel Stati	1999–2010
Adlan Shishhanov	2010–11
Zinaida Jioară	2011–13
Adlan Shishhanov	2013–17
