= Emil Caras =

Moldovan footballer and football coach

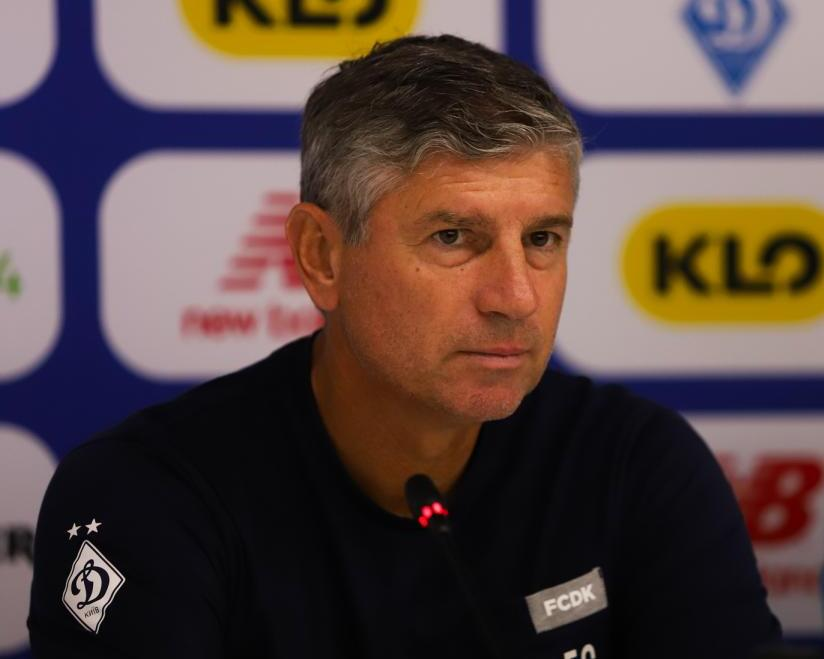
- Caras in 2023

Personal information
- Full name: Emilian Caras
- Date of birth: 21 December 1967 (age 58)
- Place of birth: Chișinău, Moldovan SSR
- Height: 1.88 m (6 ft 2 in)
- Position: Defender

Team information
- Current team: (assistant manager)

Youth career
- 1984: RSDyuSShOR Chişinău

Senior career*
Years	Team	Apps	(Gls)
1985–1986	Zarya Bălţi	38	(2)
1986	Nistru Chişinău	10	(0)
1987	Zarya Bălţi	34	(1)
1989	Tighina Bender	26	(0)
1989–1995	Zimbru Chişinău	167	(20)
1995	Spumante Cricova	13	(0)
1996–1997	Zimbru Chişinău	20	(0)
1997	Tyumen	2	(0)
1997–1998	Moldova-Gaz Chișinău	21	(1)
1999	Constructorul Chişinău	4	(0)
1999–2000	Moldova-Gaz Chișinău	31	(0)
Total		366	(24)

International career
1991–1995	Moldova	6	(0)

Managerial career
- 2003–2008: Dacia Chișinău
- 2008–2009: Tiraspol
- 2009: Olimpia
- 2009: Alania Vladikavkaz (assistant)
- 2010–2012: Kuban Krasnodar (assistant)
- 2012–2014: Dynamo Moscow (assistant)
- 2014–2015: Al-Arabi (assistant)
- 2015: ASA Târgu Mureș (assistant)
- 2015–2016: Jiangsu Sainty (assistant)
- 2016: Kuban Krasnodar (assistant)
- 2016–2017: Al-Nasr Dubai SC (assistant)
- 2017–2018: CFR Cluj (assistant)
- 2018–2019: Guizhou Hengfeng (assistant)
- 2020–2025: Dynamo Kyiv (assistant)
- 2026–: Pakhtakor (assistant)
- * Club domestic league appearances and goals

Emil Caras (born 21 December 1967) is a Moldovan professional football coach and a former player. He is an assistant coach for Tashkenti club Pakhtakor.

He made his professional debut in the Soviet Second League in 1985 for FC Zarya Bălţi.

For the last several years, he is currently working as a part of Mircea Lucescu's technical team as an assistant manager.

He is a nephew of Moldova national football team coach Ion Caras.

== Honours ==
=== As player ===
Zimbru Chișinău

- Moldovan National Division (1): 1996.

Runner-up (2): 1995, 1997.
