= 2007–08 Moldovan Cup =

Cupa Moldovei

Tournament details
- Country: Moldova

Final positions
- Champions: Sheriff
- Runners-up: Nistru

The 2007–08 Moldovan Cup was the 17th season of the Moldovan annual football cup competition. The competition started on 19 August 2007 with the preliminary round and ended with the final held on 20 May 2008.

== Preliminary round ==
14 teams entered this round. The games were played on 19 August 2007.

Team 1	Score	Team 2
Volna	4–0	Florești
Speranța	3–0	Sculeni
Telenești	0–2	Podiș
Glodeni	0–0 (2–4 p)	Flacăra
Congaz	0–1	Kolos
Maiak	1–1 (3–5 p)	Cantemir
Sinteza	3–1	Locomotiva Basarabeasca

== First round ==
The seven winners from the previous round entered this round, in addition to 13 new teams. The games were played on 26 August 2007.

Team 1	Score	Team 2
Volna	1–3	Locomotiva Bălți
Speranța	0–2	FCM Ungheni
Podiș	3–2	Viitorul
Flacăra	3–1	Izvoraș-67
Kolos	0–4	Găgăuziya
Cantemir	2–2 (4–3 p)	Cahul-2005
Sinteza	0–0 (4–3 p)	Intersport-Aroma
Viișoara	0–1	Beșiktaș
Victoria	2–4	Petrocub
Cricova	5–1	Eikomena

== Second round ==
The ten winners from the previous round entered this round, in addition to Academia, CSCA-Steaua, Dinamo, Floreni, Iskra-Stal and Rapid. The games were played on 6 September 2007.

Team 1	Score	Team 2
Locomotiva Bălți	2–3	Floreni
Podiș	2–0	FCM Ungheni
Cricova	2–0	Flacăra
Cantemir	1–3	Găgăuziya
Sinteza	1–8	Beșiktaș
Petrocub	1–2	Academia
CSCA-Steaua	1–0	Iskra-Stal
Rapid	0–2	Dinamo

== Round of 16 ==
The eight winners from the previous round entered this round, in addition to Dacia, Nistru, Olimpia, Politehnica, Sheriff, Tiligul-Tiras, Tiraspol and Zimbru. The games were played on 7 and 8 October 2007.

Team 1	Score	Team 2
CSCA-Steaua	0–3	Sheriff
Dacia	5–0	Podiș
Cricova	0–2	Tiraspol
Beșiktaș	0–1	Nistru
Dinamo	1–2	Zimbru
Floreni	0–0 (7–8 p)	Olimpia
Tiligul-Tiras	4–1	Găgăuziya
Academia	1–3	Politehnica

== Quarter-finals ==
The first legs were played on 25 October 2007. The second legs were played on 7 November 2007.

Team 1	Agg.	Team 2	1st leg	2nd leg
Olimpia	0–5	Sheriff	0–2	0–3
Tiraspol	2–0	Dacia	1–0	1–0
Nistru	3–0	Tiligul-Tiras	1–0	2–0
Zimbru	3–1	Politehnica	1–0	2–1

== Semi-finals ==
The first legs were played on 16 April 2008. The second legs were played on 7 May 2008.

Team 1	Agg.	Team 2	1st leg	2nd leg
Tiraspol	0–1	Sheriff	0–0	0–1
Nistru	5–3	Zimbru	2–1	3–2

== Final ==
20 May 2008

Sheriff	1–0	Nistru
Testemițanu 49'	Report

Zimbru Stadium, Chișinău
Attendance: 5,000
Referee: Igor Șațchi
