= 1995–96 Moldovan Cup =

Cupa Moldovei

Tournament details
- Country: Moldova

Final positions
- Champions: Constructorul
- Runners-up: Tiligul

The 1995–96 Moldovan Cup was the fifth season of the Moldovan annual football cup competition. The competition ended with the final held on 12 May 1996.

== Round of 16 ==
Team 1	Agg.	Team 2	1st leg	2nd leg
Tiligul	7–0	Sportul	3–0	4–0
Vierul	0–20	Zimbru	0–4	0–16
Constructorul	3–1	Speranța	1–0	2–1
Spumante	4–1	Lims Vital	2–0	2–1
Flacara	3–8	Locomotiva Bălți	1–4	2–4
Tighina	6–1	Torentul	1–1	5–0
Ciuhur	0–5	Locomotiva Basarabeasca	0–2	0–3
Agro	2–4	Nistru	1–1	1–3

== Quarter-finals ==
Team 1	Agg.	Team 2	1st leg	2nd leg
Nistru	1–1 (3–4 p)	Constructorul	0–1	1–0
Zimbru	1–2	Tiligul	1–1	0–1
Locomotiva Bălți	1–8	Spumante	1–2	0–6
Locomotiva Basarabeasca	2–0	Tighina	0–0	2–0

== Semi-finals ==
Team 1	Agg.	Team 2	1st leg	2nd leg
Spumante	1–5	Tiligul	0–2	1–3
Constructorul	5–3	Locomotiva Basarabeasca	4–1	1–2

== Final ==
12 May 1996

Constructorul	2–1	Tiligul
Tverdohlebov 24'; Cuciuc 65'	Report	Melnicov 87'

Stadionul Republican, Chișinău
Attendance: 3,000
Referee: Tudor Cepoi
