= 1998–99 Moldovan Cup =

Cupa Moldovei

Tournament details
- Country: Moldova

Final positions
- Champions: Sheriff
- Runners-up: Constructorul

The 1998–99 Moldovan Cup was the eighth season of the Moldovan annual football cup competition. The competition ended with the final held on 27 May 1999.

== Round of 16 ==
The first legs were played on 15 March 1999. The second legs were played on 19 March 1999.

Team 1	Agg.	Team 2	1st leg	2nd leg
Olimpia	4–3	Agro	0–1	4–2
Venita	w/o	Nistru		
Cimentul	1–9	Constructorul	1–4	0–5
Moldova-Gaz	5–2	Unisport	2–1	3–1
ULIM-Tebas	0–3	Tiligul	0–2	0–1
Roma	6–2	Universul	5–0	1–2
Maiak	0–7	Sheriff	0–5	0–2
Zimbru	w/o	Locomotiva		

== Quarter-finals ==
The first legs were played on 7 April 1999. The second legs were played on 14 and 15 April 1999.

Team 1	Agg.	Team 2	1st leg	2nd leg
Olimpia	3–1	Venita	2–0	1–1
Constructorul	2–1	Roma	1–1	1–0
Zimbru	0–3	Sheriff	0–1	0–2
Moldova-Gaz	2–0	Tiligul	1–0	1–0

== Semi-finals ==
The first legs were played on 28 April 1999. The second legs were played on 13 May 1999.

Team 1	Agg.	Team 2	1st leg	2nd leg
Moldova-Gaz	2–3	Sheriff	0–2	2–1 (a.e.t.)
Olimpia	0–9	Constructorul	0–4	0–5

== Final ==
27 May 1999

Sheriff	2–1 (a.e.t.)	Constructorul
Pertia 90'; Romaniuc 112'	Report	Dovghii 56'

Stadionul Republican, Chișinău
Attendance: 7,000
Referee: Andrei Iacovlev
