= 2001–02 Moldovan Cup =

Cupa Moldovei

Tournament details
- Country: Moldova

Final positions
- Champions: Sheriff
- Runners-up: Nistru

The 2001–02 Moldovan Cup was the 11th season of the Moldovan annual football cup competition. The competition ended with the final held on 22 May 2002.

== Round of 16 ==
The first legs were played on 10 October 2001. The second legs were played on 24 October 2001.

| Team 1 | Agg. | Team 2 | 1st leg | 2nd leg |
|---|---|---|---|---|
| Sheriff | 6–0 | Cimentul | 1–0 | 5–0 |
| Hîncești | 5–1 | Haiduc-Intersport | 3–0 | 2–1 |
| Zimbru | 10–3 | Fortuna | 5–1 | 5–2 |
| Happy End | 4–2 | Unisport-Auto | 1–1 | 3–1 |
| Dinamo | 2–5 | Constructorul | 2–1 | 0–4 |
| Agro | 2–0 | Dacia | 1–0 | 1–0 |
| Congaz | 0–11 | Tiligul | 0–2 | 0–9 |
| Viișoara | 0–6 | Nistru | 0–6 | w/o |

== Quarter-finals ==
The first legs were played on 22 March 2002. The second legs were played on 3 April 2002.

| Team 1 | Agg. | Team 2 | 1st leg | 2nd leg |
|---|---|---|---|---|
| Sheriff | 2–0 | Hîncești | 1–0 | 1–0 |
| Zimbru | w/o | Happy End | | |
| Constructorul | 1–2 | Tiligul | 1–1 | 0–1 |
| Agro | 2–2 (a) | Nistru | 2–1 | 0–1 |

== Semi-finals ==
The first legs were played on 24 April 2002. The second legs were played on 8 May 2002.

| Team 1 | Agg. | Team 2 | 1st leg | 2nd leg |
|---|---|---|---|---|
| Sheriff | 3–1 | Zimbru | 2–0 | 1–1 |
| Tiligul | 1–10 | Nistru | 0–2 | 1–8 |

== Final ==
22 May 2002

| Sheriff | 3–2 (a.e.t.) | Nistru |
|---|---|---|
| Tarkhnishvili 34' (pen.); Brown 43'; Walter 96' | Report | Blajco 41'; Bursuc 80' |

Stadionul Republican, Chișinău
Attendance: 6,000
Referee: Ghenadie Orlic
