= 2005–06 Moldovan Cup =

Cupa Moldovei

Tournament details
- Country: Moldova

Final positions
- Champions: Sheriff
- Runners-up: Nistru

The 2005–06 Moldovan Cup was the 15th season of the Moldovan annual football cup competition. The competition ended with the final held on 10 May 2006.

== Round of 16 ==
The first legs were played on 28 September 2005. The second legs were played on 19 October 2005.

Team 1	Agg.	Team 2	1st leg	2nd leg
Avenarex	0–13	Tiraspol	0–3	0–10
Fortuna	0–7	Zimbru	0–2	0–5
Intersport-Aroma	3–3 (a)	Dinamo	1–0	2–3
Dacia	9–1	Floreni	4–0	5–1
Olimpia	0–3	Nistru	0–3	w/o
CSCA-Agro	1–6	Politehnica	1–2	0–4
Viișoara	0–4	Tiligul-Tiras	0–4	w/o
Sheriff	26–0	Viitorul	10–0	16–0

== Quarter-finals ==
The first legs were played on 3 November 2005. The second legs were played on 10 November 2005.

Team 1	Agg.	Team 2	1st leg	2nd leg
Tiraspol	0–3	Zimbru	0–2	0–1
Politehnica	3–4	Nistru	0–4	3–0
Tiligul-Tiras	0–1	Dacia	0–0	0–1
Intersport-Aroma	0–7	Sheriff	0–4	0–3

== Semi-finals ==
The first legs were played on 5 April 2006. The second legs were played on 13 April 2006.

Team 1	Agg.	Team 2	1st leg	2nd leg
Sheriff	4–3	Zimbru	2–1	2–2
Nistru	1–0	Dacia	0–0	1–0

== Final ==
10 May 2006

Sheriff	2–0	Nistru
Stadiiciuc 1' (o.g.); Omotoyossi 59'	Report

Stadionul Republican, Chișinău
Attendance: 4,000
Referee: Tudor Cepoi
