= Vladimir Shishelov =

Uzbekistani-Russian football forward

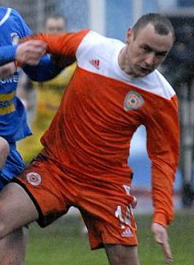

Personal information
- Full name: Vladimir Aleksandrovich Shishelov
- Date of birth: 8 November 1979 (age 47)
- Place of birth: Apsheronsk, Soviet Union
- Height: 1.76 m (5 ft 9 1/2 in)
- Position: Forward

Senior career*
Years	Team	Apps	(Gls)
1996	Qizilqum Zarafshon	18	(8)
1997–1999	Zarafshan Navoi	54	(24)
2000	Buxoro	29	(11)
2001	Shinnik Yaroslavl	2	(0)
2001–2002	Lada Togliatti	29	(8)
2002–2004	Zimbru Chişinău	45	(28)
2004	Pakhtakor Tashkent	5	(4)
2005	Khimki	3	(1)
2005	Changchun Yatai	9	(6)
2006	Oryol	1	(0)
2007	Quruvchi Tashkent	17	(3)
2008	Zvezda Irkutsk	21	(10)
2008–2009	Ural Sverdlovsk	56	(29)
2010–2011	Zhemchuzhina-Sochi	27	(5)
2011	Fakel Foronezh	15	(3)
2012	FK Andijan	11	(7)
2012	Nasaf Qarshi	11	(6)
2013–2014	Metallurg-Kuzbass Novokuznetsk	11	(3)
2014–2016	Qizilqum Zarafshon	11	(3)

International career^{‡}
2000–2012	Uzbekistan	28	(11)
- * Club domestic league appearances and goals as of 11 June 2014 (UTC) ‡ National team caps and goals as of 3 February 2014

Vladimir Aleksandrovich Shishelov (Russian: Владимир Александрович Шишелов; born 8 November 1979) is an Uzbekistani-Russian retired football forward.

== Career ==
His first professional club was Qizilqum Zarafshon he began to play in 1996. In 1997-1999 he played for Zarafshon Navoi. He moved in 2002 to Zimbru Chişinău. He played two seasons for the club. In his first season, he scored 13 goals in League matches and became 2nd best goal scorer of League. In 2003–04 season he scored 15 goals and was the top scorer of the Moldovan National Division. Shishelov won the Moldovan Cup in 2003 while playing for Zimbru Chişinău.

He got 28 caps and 11 goals for the national team between 2000 and 2012. He cannot play for the Uzbekistan national football team anymore, because he is now Russian citizen and double-citizenship is not allowed in Uzbekistan.

== Honours ==
Shinnik Yaroslavl

- Russian First League: 2001

Zimbru

- Moldovan National Division runners-up: 2002–03
- Moldovan Cup: 2003, 2004

Bunyodkor

- Uzbek League: 2007
- Uzbek Cup runners-up: 2007

Nasaf

- Uzbek Cup runners-up: 2012

Individual

- Uzbekistan Player of the Year 2nd: 2003
- Moldovan National Division Top Scorer: 2003–04 (15 goals)

== Career statistics ==
=== Goals for senior national team ===
As of 7 September 2012

#	Date	Venue	Opponent	Score	Result	Competition
1	30 April 2003	Tashkent, Uzbekistan	Belarus	1-2	Lost	Friendly
2	6 November 2003	Tashkent, Uzbekistan	Hong Kong	4-1	Won	2004 AFC Asian Cup qualification
3	6 November 2004	Tashkent, Uzbekistan	Hong Kong	4-1	Won	2004 AFC Asian Cup qualification
4	8 November 2003	Tashkent, Uzbekistan	Thailand	3-0	Won	2004 AFC Asian Cup qualification
5	8 November 2003	Tashkent, Uzbekistan	Thailand	3-0	Won	2004 AFC Asian Cup qualification
6	17 November 2003	Bangkok, Thailand	Tajikistan	4-1	Won	2004 AFC Asian Cup qualification
7	17 November 2003	Bangkok, Thailand	Tajikistan	4-1	Won	2004 AFC Asian Cup qualification
8	9 June 2004	Tashkent, Uzbekistan	Palestine	3-0	Won	2006 FIFA World Cup qualification
9	30 July 2004	Chengdu, China	Bahrain	2-2	Draw	2004 AFC Asian Cup
10	9 March 2007	Shymkent, Kazakhstan	Kyrgyzstan	6-0	Won	Friendly
11	27 March 2007	Macau, China	China	1-3	Lost	Friendly
