= Ruslan Barburoș =

Moldovan footballer (1978–2017)

Personal information
- Date of birth: 15 November 1978
- Place of birth: Chișinău, Moldavian SSR
- Date of death: 29 January 2017 (aged 38)
- Place of death: Chișinău, Moldova
- Height: 1.75 m (5 ft 9 in)
- Position: Forward

Youth career
- 1990–1994: Agro Chișinău

Senior career*
Years	Team	Apps	(Gls)
1994–1998	Agro Chișinău	77	(36)
1998–1999	Sheriff Tiraspol	17	(1)
1999	Agro Chișinău	11	(2)
2000	Energhetic Dubăsari	17	(0)
2000	Sheriff Tiraspol	14	(10)
2000	Haiduc-Sporting Chișinău	7	(3)
2000	Agro Chișinău	6	(4)
2001–2002	Sheriff Tiraspol	40	(20)
2003–2005	Tiraspol	44	(15)
2007–2008	Beșiktaș Chișinău	20	(12)
2010–2011	Costuleni	8	(1)
Total		261	(104)

International career
2001	Moldova	3	(1)
- * Club domestic league appearances and goals

Ruslan Barburoș (15 November 1978 – 29 January 2017) was a Moldovan footballer who played as a forward. He was the coach of the futsal and beach football club CS Joker-Tornado Chișinău, and coach of the Moldova national beach football team. He played three matches for the national football team in 2001 scoring one goal.

== Career statistics ==
International goals of Ruslan Barburoș
#	Date	Stadium	Opponent	Score	Result	Competition
1	2 June 2001	Gradski Stadion, Skopje, Republic of Macedonia	Macedonia	2–2	2–2	2002 FIFA World Cup qualification

== Honours ==
Individual

- Divizia Națională top scorer: 2000–01 (17 goals; shared with David Mudjiri), 2001–02 (17 goals)
