= 2007–08 Moldovan National Division =

Football league season

Moldovan National Division
- Season: 2007–08
- Champions: Sheriff Tiraspol
- Relegated: Rapid Ghidighici
- Champions League: Sheriff Tiraspol
- UEFA Cup: Dacia Chișinău; Nistru Otaci
- Intertoto Cup: FC Tiraspol
- Matches: 165
- Goals: 367 (2.22 per match)
- Top goalscorer: Igor Picușceac (14 goals)
- Biggest home win: Zimbru Chișinău 7–0 Olimpia Bălți
- Biggest away win: Tiligul-Tiras 0–4 Sheriff Tiraspol
- Highest scoring: Dinamo Bender 3–7 Dacia Chișinău

The 2007–08 Moldovan National Division (Romanian: Divizia Națională) was the 17th season of top-tier football in Moldova. The season started on 4 July 2007.

== Overview ==
FC Sheriff Tiraspol won the league for the eighth consecutive season. The champions also qualified for the 2009 Commonwealth of Independent States Cup.

Rapid Ghidighici withdrew from the league in November after the conclusion of round 16.

== League standings ==
Pos	Team	Pld	W	D	L	GF	GA	GD	Pts	Qualification or relegation
1	Sheriff Tiraspol (C)	30	26	3	1	68	8	+60	81	Qualification for the Champions League first qualifying round
2	Dacia Chișinău	30	19	5	6	60	28	+32	62	Qualification for the UEFA Cup first qualifying round
3	Nistru Otaci	30	17	8	5	34	17	+17	59	Qualification for the UEFA Cup first qualifying round
4	Tiraspol	30	16	7	7	36	21	+15	55	Qualification for the Intertoto Cup first round
5	Zimbru Chișinău	30	13	13	4	43	21	+22	52	
6	Iskra-Stal Rîbnița	30	9	8	13	23	34	−11	35	
7	Tiligul-Tiras	30	7	8	15	16	36	−20	29	
8	Olimpia Bălți	30	7	6	17	24	46	−22	27	
9	Dinamo Bender	30	7	5	18	30	57	−27	26	
10	CSCA-Steaua Chișinău	30	5	3	22	21	55	−34	18	
11	Politehnica Chișinău	30	3	6	21	7	39	−32	15	
—	Rapid Ghidighici (R)	0	0	0	0	0	0	0	0	Relegation to Division "A" (Note: Withdrew from league in November 2007. All results were annulled.)

Source: RSSSF
Rules for classification: 1) points; 2) goal difference; 3) number of goals scored.
(C) Champions; (R) Relegated

== Results ==
The schedule consists of three rounds. During the first two rounds, each team played each other once home and away for a total of 20 matches. The pairings of the third round were then set according to the standings after the first two rounds, giving every team a third game against each opponent for a total of 30 games per team.

=== First and second round ===
Home \ Away	CSC	DAC	DIN	ISK	NIS	OLI	POL	SHE	TIL	TIR	ZIM
CSCA-Steaua Chișinău		0–3	3–0	0–2	0–1	0–1	0–1	1–4	0–1	0–1	0–3
Dacia Chișinău	1–0		5–1	2–1	2–0	3–0	3–1	0–1	2–1	4–0	1–5
Dinamo Bender	1–2	3–7		0–0	2–2	1–3	2–0	1–2	3–0	0–3	1–2
Iskra-Stal	1–1	1–3	0–1		1–2	2–0	1–0	0–3	1–0	1–0	0–0
Nistru Otaci	3–0	0–1	3–1	1–0		0–0	0–0	0–0	0–0	2–1	1–0
Olimpia Bălți	4–1	1–4	1–0	1–0	0–1		0–1	0–1	1–1	0–2	0–1
Politehnica Chișinău	0–2	0–2	0–2	0–0	0–2	0–0		0–1	0–1	0–2	0–1
Sheriff Tiraspol	3–0	2–0	5–0	3–0	1–0	2–0	1–0		3–0	0–0	0–1
Tiligul-Tiras	1–0	0–0	3–1	0–0	0–1	2–1	1–0	0–1		0–2	0–1
Tiraspol	1–0	1–1	2–1	0–1	1–2	2–1	2–1	0–2	3–1		0–0
Zimbru Chișinău	3–1	0–1	0–0	1–0	1–1	7–0	0–0	1–1	0–0	1–1	

Source: EU-Football.info
Legend: Blue = home team win; Yellow = draw; Red = away team win.

=== Third round ===
Home \ Away	CSC	DAC	DIN	ISK	NIS	OLI	POL	SHE	TIL	TIR	ZIM
CSCA-Steaua Chișinău		2–0		2–3		1–1	1–0				1–3
Dacia Chișinău			2–0		2–2		2–0		3–0	0–0	
Dinamo Bender	2–1				1–2			0–2	1–0	0–2	
Iskra-Stal		0–0	1–1				3–0		2–1		0–0
Nistru Otaci	2–1			1–0		2–0		0–1			2–0
Olimpia Bălți		1–3	1–0	3–2			2–2				1–1
Politehnica Chișinău			0–1		0–1			0–3	1–0	0–3	
Sheriff Tiraspol	7–1	2–1		6–0		1–0					4–2
Tiligul-Tiras	0–0				0–0	2–1		0–4		1–1	
Tiraspol	2–0			2–0	1–0	1–0		0–2			
Zimbru Chișinău		3–2	3–3				0–0		3–0	0–0	

Source: EU-Football.info
Legend: Blue = home team win; Yellow = draw; Red = away team win.

== Top goalscorers ==
Pos	Player	Scored for	Goals
1	(Moldova) Igor Picușceac	Sheriff Tiraspol, FC Tiraspol	14
2	(Belarus) Aliaksei Kuchuk	Sheriff Tiraspol	13
2	(Cameroon) Colins Ngaha Poungoue	Nistru Otaci	13
2	(Georgia (country)) Djaba Dvali	Dacia Chișinău	13
5	(Moldova) Alexei Zhdanov	Zimbru Chișinău	12
