= CS Tiligul-Tiras Tiraspol =

Moldovan football club

Tiligul-Tiras Tiraspol
- Full name: Sport Club Tiligul-Tiras Tiraspol
- Founded: 1938
- Dissolved: 2009
- Ground: Stadionul Municipal, Tiraspol, Moldova
- Capacity: 3,525
- 2007–08: 7th in Divizia Națională
Home colours	Away colours

SC Tiligul-Tiras Tiraspol was a Moldovan football club based in Tiraspol. They played in the Divizia Națională, the top division in Moldovan football. Their home stadium was Stadionul Municipal.

Currently the club's football academy is associated with another Moldovan club FC Zaria Bălți and competes in football competitions as its reserve team in lower Moldovan leagues. During the Soviet period, the club often competed along with clubs from the neighboring Ukrainian SSR.

== History ==
=== Names ===
- Pischevik (1938 in Ukrainian SSR)
- Pischevik (1961–1962)
- Luceafărul (1963–1965)
- Dnestr (1967, 1968–1969)
- Energiya (1967)
- Start (1978)
- Avtomobilist (1979–1985)
- Tekstilschik (1986–1989)
- Tiras (1990)
- Tiligul (1991–2003)
- Tiligul-Tiras (2004–2009)
- Olimpia-2-Tiligul (2009–2011)
- Olimpia-2 (2011–2014)
- Zaria-2 Bălți (2014–present)

=== Historical outlook ===
The team from Tiraspol first appeared in Ukrainian republican competitions in 1938 playing as Pischevik in the tier 2 and placing last place. Tiraspol was part of the Ukrainian SSR within the Moldavian ASSR.

Tiligul Tiraspol was the original and oldest football team in Tiraspol, the capital of Transnistria. It was traditionally the city's only team, but in 2002 the team formerly known as Constructorul Chișinău moved to Tiraspol and changed its name to FC Tiraspol, and the same year FC Sheriff was founded as well, thus bringing the number of home teams to three. If the USSR had not dissolved, they would have played in the USSR Top League in 1992, because they were runners-up of the USSR First League in 1991. Since the establishment of the National championship, the club along with Zimbru Chișinău were main contenders for the top titles. With establishing of Sheriff Tiraspol, Tiligul has faded away and eventually ceased its operations in 2009. Sheriff became the best club not only in the city but across the whole Republic of Moldova.

Among its most famous former players is Serghei Covalciuc, who was discovered in 1999 and was hired to play for Spartak Moscow.

Tiligul took part in European club competitions five times but never won a match in either Cup Winner's Cup or UEFA Cup qualifying which makes them one of the rare teams to have played at least 10 matches in European club competitions (Intertoto Cup excluded) without scoring any victories (though the record for being the least successful team in European club competitions is believed to be Etzella Ettelbruck (Luxembourg) because Etzella lost all their twelve games in UEFA Cup qualifying rounds between 2001 and 2007).

Tiligul's colors were crimson shirts and shorts at home and either white shirts and shorts or violet shirts and shorts on the road.

Tiligul-Tiras had to cease operations after they were not able to provide the necessary funds to keep the club alive.

Later the club found agreement with another Moldavian club FC Olimpia, yielding its club's infrastructure for adaptation of the Olimpia's farm team Olimpia-2 as Olimpia-2 Tiligul.

== Achievements ==
- Moldovan Cup
  - Winners (3): 1992–93, 1993–94, 1994–95
- Divizia A
  - Winners (1): 2002–03
- Football Championship of the Moldovan SSR
  - Winners (4): 1956, 1965, 1987, 1989

== European record ==
Season	Competition	Round	Opponents	Home	Away	Aggregate
1994–95	UEFA Cup Winners' Cup	1	(Cyprus) AC Omonia	0–1	1–3	1–4
1995–96	UEFA Cup Winners' Cup	1	(Switzerland) FC Sion	0–0	2–3	2–3
1996–97	UEFA Cup	1	(Belarus) Dinamo-93 Minsk	1–1	1–3	2–4
1997–98	UEFA Cup	1	(Switzerland) Neuchâtel Xamax	1–3	0–7	1–10
1998–99	UEFA Cup	1	(Belgium) Anderlecht	0–1	0–5	0–6
1999	UEFA Intertoto Cup	1	(Poland) Polonia Warsaw	0–0	0–4	0–4
2001	UEFA Intertoto Cup	1	(Northern Ireland) Cliftonville F.C.	1–0	3–1	4–1
2001	UEFA Intertoto Cup	2	(Hungary) Tatabánya	1–1	0–4	1–5
2005	UEFA Intertoto Cup	1	(Poland) Pogoń Szczecin	0–3	2–6	2–9

== List of seasons ==
Season	League									Cup	Ref
Season	Division	Pos	Pld	W	D	L	GF	GA	Pts	Cup	Ref
1992	Divizia Națională	2nd	22	15	5	2	40	13	35	Runners-up	
1992–93	Divizia Națională	2nd	30	20	7	3	80	28	47	Winners	
1993–94	Divizia Națională	2nd	30	23	3	4	94	32	49	Winners	
1994–95	Divizia Națională	2nd	26	21	3	2	78	18	66	Winners	
1995–96	Divizia Națională	2nd	30	24	2	4	95	21	74	Runners-up	
1996–97	Divizia Națională	3rd	30	20	8	2	73	12	68	Semi-finals	
1997–98	Divizia Națională	2nd	26	19	2	5	45	20	59	Semi-finals	
1998–99	Divizia Națională	3rd	26	11	6	9	26	27	39	Quarter-finals	
1999–2000	Divizia Națională	5th	36	12	13	11	35	33	49	Quarter-finals	
2000–01	Divizia Națională	3rd	28	11	8	9	33	34	41	Quarter-finals	
2001–02	Divizia Națională	↓ 7th	28	6	7	15	24	46	25	Semi-finals	
2002–03	Divizia A	↑ 1st	26	21	2	3	63	12	65	Round of 16	
2003–04	Divizia Națională	6th	28	5	14	9	21	26	29	Round of 16	
2004–05	Divizia Națională	6th	28	11	8	9	32	27	41	Semi-finals	
2005–06	Divizia Națională	4th	28	7	13	8	22	23	34	Quarter-finals	
2006–07	Divizia Națională	8th	36	6	15	15	23	46	33	Quarter-finals	
2007–08	Divizia Națională	7th	30	7	8	15	16	36	29	Quarter-finals	
2008–09	Divizia Națională	10th	30	7	4	19	24	60	25	Quarter-finals	

== See also ==
- SKA Odessa, represented Tiraspol in 1972–1975 as Zvezda Tiraspol
