= 2003–04 Moldovan National Division =

Moldovan National Division
- Season: 2003–04
- Champions: Sheriff Tiraspol
- Relegated: Agro Chișinău
- Champions League: Sheriff Tiraspol
- UEFA Cup: Nistru Otaci; Zimbru Chișinău
- Matches: 112
- Goals: 259 (2.31 per match)
- Top goalscorer: Vladimir Shishelov (15 goals)

The 2003–04 Moldovan National Division (Romanian: Divizia Națională) was the 13th season of top-tier football in Moldova.

== Overview ==
It was contested by 8 teams and Sheriff Tiraspol won the championship.

== League standings ==
Pos	Team	Pld	W	D	L	GF	GA	GD	Pts	Qualification or relegation
1	Sheriff Tiraspol (C)	28	20	5	3	50	16	+34	65	Qualification for the Champions League first qualifying round
2	Nistru Otaci	28	17	6	5	47	26	+21	57	Qualification for the UEFA Cup first qualifying round (Note: Moldovan Cup winners Zimbru Chișinău failed to obtain a UEFA licence and were replaced by league 4th-placed club FC Tiraspol.)
3	Zimbru Chișinău	28	14	7	7	40	23	+17	49	
4	Tiraspol	28	12	9	7	32	22	+10	45	Qualification for the UEFA Cup first qualifying round
5	Dacia Chișinău	28	9	8	11	26	28	−2	35	
6	Tiligul-Tiras Tiraspol	28	5	14	9	21	26	−5	29	
7	Unisport-Auto Chișinău (O)	28	6	5	17	29	52	−23	23	Qualification for the relegation play-off
8	Agro Chișinău (R)	28	1	2	25	14	66	−52	5	Relegation to Division "A"

Source: rsssf.com
(C) Champions; (O) Play-off winners; (R) Relegated

== Results ==
=== First and second round ===
Home \ Away	AGR	DAC	NIS	SHE	TIL	TIR	UAC	ZIM
Agro Chișinău		1–2	1–5	1–1	2–3	1–2	0–1	1–3
Dacia Chișinău	1–0		0–1	1–2	0–0	1–0	1–1	1–2
Nistru Otaci	1–0	4–1		1–0	0–0	2–0	4–3	0–2
Sheriff Tiraspol	2–1	2–1	1–1		3–1	2–0	2–1	1–0
Tiligul-Tiras Tiraspol	2–0	2–2	1–1	0–0		1–2	1–0	0–0
Tiraspol	1–0	0–0	2–1	0–2	0–0		3–0	2–0
Unisport-Auto Chișinău	4–2	0–2	1–2	0–3	2–1	0–0		0–3
Zimbru Chișinău	2–0	0–1	0–2	0–3	3–0	0–0	1–0	

Source: EU-Football.info
Legend: Blue = home team win; Yellow = draw; Red = away team win.

=== Third and fourth round ===
Home \ Away	AGR	DAC	NIS	SHE	TIL	TIR	UAC	ZIM
Agro Chișinău		0–2	0–5	0–2	0–2	0–5	2–0	0–5
Dacia Chișinău	3–0		3–2	0–1	0–0	0–1	3–1	1–1
Nistru Otaci	1–0	1–0		1–1	0–0	3–0	2–1	2–0
Sheriff Tiraspol	3–0	3–0	3–0		1–0	2–0	3–3	2–0
Tiligul-Tiras Tiraspol	3–0	0–0	0–1	0–2		1–1	0–0	2–2
Tiraspol	2–1	0–0	1–2	2–1	1–1		5–1	0–0
Unisport-Auto Chișinău	3–1	1–0	1–1	0–2	1–0	0–2		2–3
Zimbru Chișinău	0–0	2–0	4–1	2–0	2–0	0–0	3–2	

Source: EU-Football.info
Legend: Blue = home team win; Yellow = draw; Red = away team win.

== Relegation/promotion play-off ==
17 June 2004

Unisport-Auto Chișinău	2–1	Politehnica Chișinău

Chișinău

== Top goalscorers ==
Pos.	Player	Club	Goals
1	(Uzbekistan) Vladimir Shishelov	Zimbru Chișinău	15
2	(Moldova) Iulian Bursuc	Nistru Otaci	11
3	(Ukraine) Andriy Nesteruk	Sheriff Tiraspol	10
4	(Moldova) Sergiu Jăpălău	Dacia Chișinău	9
5	(Moldova) Ruslan Barburoș	Sheriff Tiraspol	8
6	(Moldova) Anatol Doroș	Nistru Otaci	7
6	(Moldova) Alexandru Golban	Dacia Chișinău	7
