= FC Bălți =

Association football club in Moldova

Bălți
- Full name: Fotbal Club Bălți
- Founded: 1984; 42 years ago as Zaria Bălți
- Ground: Stadionul Municipal Bălți
- Capacity: 5,200
- President: Vladimir Țaranu
- Head coach: Alexandr Patraman (caretaker)
- League: Liga
- 2025–26: Liga, 5th of 8
Home colours	Away colours

Fotbal Club Bălți, commonly known as Bălți, is a Moldovan professional football club based in Bălți, founded in 1984 as FC Zaria Bălți and refounded in 2020 as FC Bălți. They play in the Liga, the top division of Moldovan football. Between 1992 and 2014, the team was known as FC Olimpia Bălți.

== History ==
Old logo

The club was founded in 1984 as FC Zaria Bălți (Russian: ФК Заря Бельцы), and in 1992, when Moldova gained its independence, the club was renamed to FC Olimpia Bălți. In July 2014 it was decided to return to the old name – FC Zaria Bălți.

Old logo

=== Name history ===
- FC Zaria Bălți (1984–1991)
- FC Olimpia Bălți (1992–2014)
- FC Zaria Bălți (2014–2019)
- FC Bălți (2020–)

== Players ==
As of 6 September 2026

Note: Flags indicate national team as defined under FIFA eligibility rules; some limited exceptions apply. Players may hold more than one non-FIFA nationality.

No.	Pos.	Nation	Player
1	GK	MDA	Victor Veșca
4	MF	MDA	Cătălin Roșca
5	DF	MDA	Sebastian Creciun
7	MF	MDA	Damian Rusu
8	MF	MDA	Vladislav Glavațchi
9	FW	MDA	Maxim Cebotari
10	FW	MDA	Alexandr Bagrin
11	FW	MDA	Dan-Lucian Burlacu
19	FW	MDA	Alexandr Ghinaitis
20	MF	MDA	Marin Hacina

No.	Pos.	Nation	Player
21	DF	MDA	Ernest Puga
22	MF	ARG	Rubén Gómez
24	FW	MDA	Dumitru Rogac (captain)
29	DF	MDA	Nicu Garciu
31	MF	MDA	Dmitrii Harabari
32	MF	MDA	Sandu Roga
55	MF	MDA	Kirill Guțul
33	GK	MDA	Artur Nazarciuc
71	MF	MDA	Daniil Faina

== Honours ==
Cupa Moldovei

Winners (1): 2015–16
Runners-up (3): 2010–11, 2016–17, 2022–23

Supercupa Moldovei

Runners-up (1): 2016

Divizia A (level 2)

Winners (1): 2020–21

== League history ==
Season	League									Cup	Super Cup	Europe		Ref
Season	Division	Pos	Pld	W	D	L	GF	GA	Pts	Cup	Super Cup	Europe		Ref
1992	1st	9th	22	5	7	10	19	24	17	DNE	–	–		
1992–93	1st	7th	30	14	6	10	40	28	34	Quarter-finals	–	–		
1993–94	1st	5th	30	13	8	9	35	41	34	Quarter-finals	–	–		
1994–95	1st	3rd	26	17	6	3	53	24	57	Quarter-finals	–	–		
1995–96	1st	5th	30	19	6	5	55	25	63	Round of 32	–	–		
1996–97	1st	5th	30	18	6	6	75	34	60	Semi-finals	–	–		
1997–98	1st	6th	26	12	8	6	40	21	44	Round of 16	–	–		
1998–99	1st	5th	26	7	9	10	14	22	30	Semi-finals	–	–		
1999–2000	1st	6th	36	13	7	16	42	51	46	Quarter-finals	–	–		
2000–01	1st	↓ 8th	28	3	5	20	19	49	14	Quarter-finals	–	–		
2001–02	2nd	4th	30	15	8	7	60	45	53	—N/a	–	–		
2002–03	2nd	4th	26	14	7	5	47	29	49	—N/a	–	–		
2003–04	2nd	8th	30	15	5	10	55	31	50	Round of 16	–	–		
2004–05	2nd	3rd	30	21	6	3	63	22	69	Round of 16	–	–		
2005–06	2nd	↑ 3rd	28	18	5	5	66	23	59	Round of 16	–	–		
2006–07	1st	6th	36	12	6	18	38	50	42	Round of 16	–	–		
2007–08	1st	8th	30	7	6	17	24	46	27	Quarter-finals	–	–		
2008–09	1st	6th	30	11	7	12	30	32	40	Quarter-finals	–	–		
2009–10	1st	3rd	33	17	9	7	45	23	60	Semi-finals	–	–		
2010–11	1st	6th	39	21	11	7	59	31	74	Runners-up	–	UEL	2Q	
2011–12	1st	5th	33	10	15	8	26	27	45	Quarter-finals	–	–		
2012–13	1st	10th	33	10	5	18	31	50	35	Round of 16	–	–		
2013–14	1st	11th	33	5	3	25	26	77	18	Round of 16	–	–		
2014–15	1st	9th	24	4	0	20	10	66	12	Round of 16	–	–		
2015–16	1st	4th	27	12	6	9	36	29	42	Winners	–	–		
2016–17	1st	4th	30	20	5	5	56	21	65	Runners-up	Runners-up	UEL	1Q	
2017	1st	5th	18	7	3	8	28	20	24	Quarter-finals	–	UEL	2Q	
2018	1st	↓ 8th	28	4	10	14	26	46	22	Quarter-finals	–	UEL	1Q	
2019	2nd	10th	28	9	4	15	65	60	31	First round	–	–		
2020–21	2nd	↑ 1st	26	23	0	3	85	17	69	Second round	–	–		
2021–22	1st	5th	28	11	3	14	39	39	36	Quarter-finals	–	–		
2022–23	1st	6th	24	5	7	12	18	26	22	Runners-up	–	–		
2023–24	1st	5th	24	9	3	12	33	44	30	Semi-finals	–	–		
2024–25	1st	5th	24	7	7	10	27	33	28	Quarter-finals	–	–		

== European record ==
Competition	Played	Won	Drew	Lost	GF	GA	GD	Win%
UEFA Champions League	0	0	0	0	0	0	+0	—
UEFA Europa League	12	2	3	7	9	21	−12	16.67
UEFA Conference League	0	0	0	0	0	0	+0	—
Total	12	2	3	7	9	21	−12	16.67

Legend: GF = Goals For. GA = Goals Against. GD = Goal Difference.

Season	Competition	Round	Club	Home	Away	Aggregate
2010–11	UEFA Europa League	1Q	(Azerbaijan) Khazar Lankaran	0–0	1–1	1–1 (a)
2010–11	UEFA Europa League	2Q	(Romania) Dinamo București	0–2	1–5	1–7
2016–17	UEFA Europa League	1Q	(Hungary) Videoton	2–0	0–3	2–3
2017–18	UEFA Europa League	1Q	(Bosnia and Herzegovina) Sarajevo	2–1	1–2 (a.e.t)	3–3 (6–5 p)
2017–18	UEFA Europa League	2Q	(Cyprus) Apollon Limassol	1–2	0–3	1–5
2018–19	UEFA Europa League	1Q	(Poland) Górnik Zabrze	1–1	0–1	1–2
