= FC Happy End Camenca =

Happy End Camenca
- Full name: Fotbal Club Happy End Camenca
- Founded: 1999
- Dissolved: 2002
- Ground: Stadionul Camenca; Camenca, Moldova
- Capacity: 1,000
- 2001–02: Moldovan National Division, 8th

Happy End Camenca was a Moldovan Futsal football club based in Camenca, Moldova. The team played in the Moldovan National Division, the top division in Moldovan football.

It was founded in 1999 and dissolved in 2002.

== Achievements ==
- Divizia B

Winners (1): 1999–2000
