= FC Nistru Otaci =

Nistru Otaci
- Full name: Football Club Nistru Otaci
- Founded: 17 August 1953
- Dissolved: 2017
- Ground: Călărășeuca Stadium
- Capacity: 2,000
- 2016–17: Divizia B (North), 12th of 14 (withdrew)
Home colours	Away colours

FC Nistru Otaci was a Moldovan football club based in Otaci, Moldova. The club was founded on 17 August 1953. It was dissolved in 2017.

== History ==
During the 1999–2000 season, the club played as FC Nistru-Unisport Otaci due to Nistru being expelled in the summer of 1999. The club merged with Unisport Chişinău, which allowed Nistru to use Unisport's top flight position to play. However, this merger was canceled in 2000, sending Unisport back down to the Divizia A.

In June 2020, club president Vasile Traghira died.

== Honours ==
=== League ===
- Moldovan National Division
  - Runners-up (3): 2001–02, 2003–04, 2004–05
- Moldovan "A" Division
  - Winners (1): 1992

=== Cup ===
- Moldovan Cup
  - Winners (1): 2004–05
  - Runners-up (8): 1993–94, 1996–97, 2000–01, 2001–02, 2002–03, 2005–06, 2006–07, 2007–08
- Moldovan Super Cup
  - Runners-up (1): 2005

== European record ==
Season	Competition	Round	Opponents	Home leg	Away leg	Aggregate
2000	UEFA Intertoto Cup	1	(Wales) Cwmbrân Town	1–0	1–0	2–0
2000	UEFA Intertoto Cup	2	SV Austria Salzburg	2–6	1–1	3–7
2001–02	UEFA Cup	Q	(Hungary) Debrecen	1–0	0–3	1–3
2002–03	UEFA Cup	Q	(Scotland) Aberdeen	0–0	0–1	0–1
2003–04	UEFA Cup	Q	(Serbia) Red Star Belgrade	2–3	0–5	2–8
2004–05	UEFA Cup	Q1	(Belarus) Shakhtyor Soligorsk	1–1	2–1	3–2
2004–05	UEFA Cup	Q2	(Czech Republic) Sigma Olomouc	0–4	1–2	1–6
2005–06	UEFA Cup	Q1	(Azerbaijan) Khazar Lenkoran	2–1	3–1	5–2
2005–06	UEFA Cup	Q2	(Austria) GAK	0–1	0–2	0–3
2006–07	UEFA Cup	Q1	(Belarus) BATE Borisov	0–1	0–2	0–3
2007–08	UEFA Cup	Q1	(Hungary) Budapest Honvéd	1–1	1–1	2–2 (4–5 p)
2008–09	UEFA Cup	Q1	(Germany) Hertha BSC	0–0	1–8	1–8

== List of seasons ==
Season	League									Cup	Ref
Season	Division	Pos	Pld	W	D	L	GF	GA	Pts	Cup	Ref
1992	Divizia A	↑ 1st	20	15	3	2	47	33	33	Quarter-finals	
1992–93	Divizia Națională	8th	30	12	8	10	45	54	32	Semi-finals	
1993–94	Divizia Națională	4th	30	14	10	6	44	21	38	Runners-up	
1994–95	Divizia Națională	5th	26	15	4	7	55	25	49	Quarter-finals	
1995–96	Divizia Națională	6th	30	15	7	8	63	28	52	Quarter-finals	
1996–97	Divizia Națională	4th	30	19	6	5	58	21	63	Runners-up	
1997–98	Divizia Națională	4th	26	13	6	7	36	20	45	Semi-finals	
1998–99	Divizia Națională	8th	18	5	4	9	17	18	18	Round of 16	
1999–2000 (Note: The club played as Nistru-Unisport Otaci in the 1999–2000 season)	Divizia Națională	4th	36	16	11	9	53	28	59	Semi-finals	
2000–01	Divizia Națională	5th	28	9	6	13	31	39	33	Runners-up	
2001–02	Divizia Națională	2nd	28	14	10	4	40	19	52	Runners-up	
2002–03	Divizia Națională	3rd	24	13	3	8	33	24	42	Runners-up	
2003–04	Divizia Națională	2nd	28	17	6	5	47	26	57	Semi-finals	
2004–05	Divizia Națională	2nd	28	17	3	8	51	27	54	Winners	
2005–06	Divizia Națională	5th	28	6	13	9	24	27	31	Runners-up	
2006–07	Divizia Națională	3rd	36	16	9	11	44	36	57	Runners-up	
2007–08	Divizia Națională	3rd	30	17	8	5	34	17	59	Runners-up	
2008–09	Divizia Națională	8th	30	8	6	16	30	43	30	Quarter-finals	
2009–10	Divizia Națională	12th	33	2	5	26	13	74	11	Round of 16	
2010–11	Divizia Națională	11th	39	7	4	28	33	75	25	Round of 16	
2011–12	Divizia Națională	8th	33	10	9	14	30	41	39	Quarter-finals	
2012–13	Divizia Națională	↓ 12th	33	2	6	25	21	83	12	Quarter-finals	

== Managers ==
- (Moldova) Alexandru Spiridon (2002–2004)
- (Moldova) Alexandru Mațiura (200? – May 2006)
- (Ukraine) Mykola Kopystyanskyi (200? – Jun 2007)
- (Russia) Valeri Zazdravnykh (Jun 2007 – Sep 2007)
- (Moldova) Nicolae Bunea (Sep 2007 – May 2008)
- (Moldova) Lilian Popescu (May 2008 – Oct 2012)
- (Ukraine) Oleksandr Holokolosov (Jan 2013 – Feb 2013)
- (Ukraine) Yuriy Malyhin (Feb 2013 – Mar 2013)
- (Ukraine) Volodymyr Lyutyi (Mar 2013 – Apr 2013)
- (Moldova) Vitali Mostovoi (Apr 2013 – ?)
