= 2004–05 Moldovan National Division =

Moldovan National Division
- Season: 2004–05
- Champions: Sheriff Tiraspol
- Relegated: Unisport-Auto Chișinău; Steaua Chișinău
- Champions League: Sheriff Tiraspol
- UEFA Cup: Nistru Otaci; Dacia Chișinău
- Intertoto Cup: Tiligul-Tiras Tiraspol
- Matches: 112
- Goals: 269 (2.4 per match)
- Top goalscorer: Cătălin Lichioiu (16 goals)

The 2004–05 Moldovan National Division (Romanian: Divizia Națională) was the 14th season of top-tier football in Moldova.

== Overview ==
It was contested by 8 teams and Sheriff Tiraspol won the championship.

== League standings ==
Pos	Team	Pld	W	D	L	GF	GA	GD	Pts	Qualification or relegation
1	Sheriff Tiraspol (C)	28	22	4	2	54	12	+42	70	Qualification for the Champions League first qualifying round
2	Nistru Otaci	28	17	3	8	51	27	+24	54	Qualification for the UEFA Cup first qualifying round
3	Dacia Chișinău	28	14	3	11	38	31	+7	45	Qualification for the UEFA Cup first qualifying round
4	Tiraspol	28	12	8	8	41	23	+18	44	
5	Zimbru Chișinău	28	12	7	9	29	15	+14	43	
6	Tiligul-Tiras Tiraspol	28	11	8	9	32	27	+5	41	Qualification for the Intertoto Cup first round
7	Unisport-Auto Chișinău (R)	28	3	5	20	16	51	−35	14	Qualification for the relegation play-off
8	Steaua Chișinău (R)	28	0	4	24	8	83	−75	4	Relegation to Division "A"

Source: rsssf.com
(C) Champions; (R) Relegated

== Results ==
=== First and second round ===
Home \ Away	DAC	NIS	SHE	STE	TIL	TIR	UAC	ZIM
Dacia Chișinău		1–3	1–1	3–0	1–1	0–0	2–0	0–1
Nistru Otaci	4–2		0–1	4–0	2–1	1–0	2–0	0–1
Sheriff Tiraspol	2–0	2–0		3–0	2–0	1–0	6–1	2–1
Steaua Chișinău	0–2	0–3	0–4		1–1	1–1	0–0	0–0
Tiligul-Tiras Tiraspol	3–1	1–3	0–1	4–0		1–0	1–0	0–1
Tiraspol	2–1	0–1	1–3	7–0	1–1		0–0	1–1
Unisport-Auto Chișinău	1–2	0–2	0–2	4–1	0–0	1–1		0–0
Zimbru Chișinău	0–1	2–0	0–1	1–0	3–0	0–1	5–1	

Source: EU-Football.info
Legend: Blue = home team win; Yellow = draw; Red = away team win.

=== Third and fourth round ===
Home \ Away	DAC	NIS	SHE	STE	TIL	TIR	UAC	ZIM
Dacia Chișinău		2–1	0–1	3–0	1–0	4–1	3–0	1–0
Nistru Otaci	2–0		0–0	7–2	0–0	1–0	4–1	1–1
Sheriff Tiraspol	2–0	4–1		5–0	0–0	2–3	1–0	1–3
Steaua Chișinău	1–2	0–5	0–2		0–1	0–4	0–2	0–2
Tiligul-Tiras Tiraspol	3–2	4–2	1–2	3–1		0–1	2–0	1–0
Tiraspol	1–0	2–0	0–1	5–1	1–1		2–1	0–0
Unisport-Auto Chișinău	1–2	0–1	0–2	2–0	1–2	0–4		0–1
Zimbru Chișinău	0–1	0–1	0–0	3–0	0–0	0–2	3–0	

Source: EU-Football.info
Legend: Blue = home team win; Yellow = draw; Red = away team win.

== Relegation/promotion play-off ==
2005

Unisport-Auto Chișinău	0–4 (a.e.t.)	Politehnica Chișinău

Chișinău

== Top goalscorers ==
	Player	Club	Goals
1	(Romania) Cătălin Lichioiu	Nistru Otaci	16
2	(Ukraine) Andriy Nesteruk	FC Tiraspol	14
3	(Romania) Răzvan Cociș	Sheriff Tiraspol	12
4	(Moldova) Serghei Jăpălău	Dacia Chișinău	10
5	(Moldova) Sergiu Chirilov	Zimbru Chișinău	7
