= 2001–02 Moldovan National Division =

Moldovan National Division
- Season: 2001–02
- Champions: Sheriff Tiraspol
- Relegated: Tiligul-Tiras Tiraspol; Happy End Camenca
- Champions League: Sheriff Tiraspol
- UEFA Cup: Nistru Otaci; Zimbru Chișinău
- Intertoto Cup: Constructorul-93 Cioburciu
- Top goalscorer: Ruslan Barburoș (17 goals)

The 2001–02 Moldovan National Division (Romanian: Divizia Națională) was the 11th season of top-tier football in Moldova.

== Overview ==
It was contested by 8 teams and Sheriff Tiraspol won the championship.

== League standings ==
Pos	Team	Pld	W	D	L	GF	GA	GD	Pts	Qualification or relegation
1	Sheriff Tiraspol (C)	28	20	7	1	62	18	+44	67	Qualification for the Champions League first qualifying round
2	Nistru Otaci	28	14	10	4	40	19	+21	52	Qualification for the UEFA Cup qualifying round
3	Zimbru Chișinău	28	12	10	6	52	20	+32	46	Qualification for the UEFA Cup qualifying round
4	Constructorul-93 Cioburciu (Note: Constructorul changed name to Constructorul-93 and were relocated from Chișinău to Cioburciu.)	28	11	6	11	36	42	−6	39	Qualification for the Intertoto Cup first round
5	Hîncești (Note: Newly promoted side Petrocub-Condor from Sărata Galbenă changed name to FC Hîncești and relocated to Hîncești)	28	7	11	10	30	40	−10	32	
6	Agro Chișinău	28	8	5	15	25	38	−13	29	
7	Tiligul-Tiras Tiraspol (R)	28	6	7	15	24	46	−22	25	Qualification for the relegation play-off
8	Happy End Camenca (R)	28	3	6	19	23	69	−46	15	Relegation to Division "A"

Source: rsssf.com
(C) Champions; (R) Relegated

== Results ==
=== First and second round ===
Home \ Away	AGR	CON	HEC	HÎN	NIS	SHE	TIL	ZIM
Agro Chișinău		0–3	0–1	1–0	0–2	1–3	1–2	0–4
Constructorul-93 Cioburciu	0–1		2–1	1–5	1–1	0–1	1–0	2–2
Happy End Camenca	1–1	3–0		1–1	2–4	1–2	1–1	1–1
Hîncești	2–1	3–3	2–1		0–2	0–6	3–1	0–5
Nistru Otaci	2–0	3–0	3–1	2–0		0–1	0–0	0–2
Sheriff Tiraspol	2–2	4–0	1–0	2–0	1–1		3–1	0–0
Tiligul-Tiras Tiraspol	1–2	3–0	2–2	1–0	2–1	0–1		1–2
Zimbru Chișinău	2–0	2–0	1–1	0–0	0–0	2–3	5–0	

Source: EU-Football.info
Legend: Blue = home team win; Yellow = draw; Red = away team win.

=== Third and fourth round ===
Home \ Away	AGR	CON	HEC	HÎN	NIS	SHE	TIL	ZIM
Agro Chișinău		0–1	2–1	1–0	1–2	1–2	5–2	1–0
Constructorul-93 Cioburciu	1–0		5–0	1–1	2–2	4–2	1–0	2–2
Happy End Camenca	0–2	0–1		0–3	0–1	0–4	3–0	0–3
Hîncești	0–0	2–1	3–1		0–0	0–0	1–1	1–1
Nistru Otaci	0–0	2–1	6–0	2–1		0–3	1–0	2–0
Sheriff Tiraspol	3–2	2–1	5–1	0–0	0–0		3–0	2–0
Tiligul-Tiras Tiraspol	0–0	0–1	3–0	1–1	1–1	0–5		1–0
Zimbru Chișinău	1–0	0–1	10–0	4–1	0–0	1–1	2–0	

Source: EU-Football.info
Legend: Blue = home team win; Yellow = draw; Red = away team win.

== Relegation/promotion play-off ==
19 June 2002

Tiligul-Tiras Tiraspol	1–2	Politehnica Chișinău
Hromtov 81'		44' Anghel; 45' Caras

Tiraspol

== Top goalscorers ==
Pos.	Player	Club	Goals
1	(Moldova) Ruslan Barburoș	Sheriff Tiraspol	17
2	(Ukraine) Andriy Nesteruk	Constructorul-93 (7)/Sheriff (7)	14
3	(Moldova) Victor Berco	Zimbru Chișinău	12
4	(Moldova) Alexandr Blajco	Nistru Otaci	9
4	(Moldova) Eduard Blănuță	Hîncești	9
4	(Moldova) Serghei Dadu	Sheriff (3)/Constructorul-93 (6)	9
