= Moldovan Cup =

Annual football competition in Moldova

- Organiser(s): Moldovan Football Federation
- Founded: 1992; 34 years ago
- Teams: 47
- Qualifier for: UEFA Europa League
- Current champions: Sheriff Tiraspol (13th title)
- Most championships: Sheriff Tiraspol (13 titles)
- Broadcaster(s): We Sport TV; Liga TV
- Website: fmf.md
- 2026–27 Moldovan Cup

The Moldovan Cup (Romanian: Cupa Moldovei), officially known as Cupa Orange for sponsorship reasons, is a football competition, held annually in Moldova. The winner qualifies for the UEFA Europa League first qualifying round.

== Finals ==
The finals were:

Season	Winner	Score	Runner-up	Venue
1992	Bugeac Comrat	5–0	Tiligul-Tiras Tiraspol	Stadionul Republican, Chişinău
1992–93	Tiligul-Tiras Tiraspol	1–0	Dinamo Chişinău	Stadionul Republican, Chişinău
1993–94	Tiligul-Tiras Tiraspol	1–0 aet	Nistru Otaci	Stadionul Republican, Chişinău
1994–95	Tiligul-Tiras Tiraspol	1–0	Zimbru Chişinău	Stadionul Republican, Chişinău
1995–96	Constructorul Chişinău	2–1	Tiligul-Tiras Tiraspol	Stadionul Republican, Chişinău
1996–97	Zimbru Chişinău	0–0 aet, 7–6 pen	Nistru Otaci	Stadionul Republican, Chişinău
1997–98	Zimbru Chişinău	1–0	Constructorul Chişinău	Stadionul Republican, Chişinău
1998–99	Sheriff Tiraspol	2–1 aet	Constructorul Chişinău	Stadionul Republican, Chişinău
1999–2000	Constructorul Chişinău	1–0	Zimbru Chişinău	Stadionul Republican, Chişinău
2000–01	Sheriff Tiraspol	0–0 aet, 5–4 pen	Nistru Otaci	Stadionul Republican, Chişinău
2001–02	Sheriff Tiraspol	3–2 aet	Nistru Otaci	Stadionul Republican, Chişinău
2002–03	Zimbru Chişinău	0–0 aet, 4–2 pen	Nistru Otaci	Stadionul Republican, Chişinău
2003–04	Zimbru Chişinău	2–1	Sheriff Tiraspol	Stadionul Republican, Chişinău
2004–05	Nistru Otaci	1–0	Dacia Chişinău	Stadionul Republican, Chişinău
2005–06	Sheriff Tiraspol	2–0	Nistru Otaci	Stadionul Republican, Chişinău
2006–07	Zimbru Chişinău	1–0	Nistru Otaci	Stadionul Republican, Chişinău
2007–08	Sheriff Tiraspol	1–0	Nistru Otaci	Stadionul Republican, Chişinău
2008–09	Sheriff Tiraspol	2–0	Dacia Chişinău	Zimbru Stadium, Chişinău
2009–10	Sheriff Tiraspol	2–0	Dacia Chişinău	Zimbru Stadium, Chişinău
2010–11	Iskra-Stal	2–1	Olimpia Bălți	Zimbru Stadium, Chişinău
2011–12	Milsami Orhei	0–0 aet, 5–3 pen	CSCA–Rapid	CSR Orhei, Orhei
2012–13	Tiraspol	2–2 aet, 4–2 pen	Veris Drăgăneşti	Zimbru Stadium, Chişinău
2013–14	Zimbru Chișinău	3–1	Sheriff Tiraspol	Zimbru Stadium, Chişinău
2014–15	Sheriff Tiraspol	3–2 aet	Dacia Chişinău	Zimbru Stadium, Chişinău
2015–16	Zaria Bălți	1–0 aet	Milsami Orhei	Zimbru Stadium, Chişinău
2016–17	Sheriff Tiraspol	5–0	Zaria Bălți	Zimbru Stadium, Chişinău
2017–18	Milsami Orhei	2–0 aet	Zimbru Chișinău	Zimbru Stadium, Chişinău
2018–19	Sheriff Tiraspol	1–0 aet	Sfântul Gheorghe	Zimbru Stadium, Chişinău
2019–20	Petrocub Hîncești	0–0 aet, 5–3 pen	Sfântul Gheorghe	Zimbru Stadium, Chişinău
2020–21	Sfântul Gheorghe	0–0 aet, 3–2 pen	Sheriff Tiraspol	Zimbru Stadium, Chişinău
2021–22	Sheriff Tiraspol	1–0	Sfântul Gheorghe	Nisporeni Stadium, Nisporeni
2022–23	Sheriff Tiraspol	0–0 aet, 7–6 pen	Bălți	Stadionul Municipal, Hîncești
2023–24	Petrocub Hîncești	3–1	Zimbru Chișinău	Zimbru Stadium, Chișinău
2024–25	Sheriff Tiraspol	2–1	Milsami Orhei	Sheriff Arena, Tiraspol
2025–26	Sheriff Tiraspol	2–0	Zimbru Chișinău	Zimbru Stadium, Chișinău

== Top goalscorers ==
Season	Name	Goals
2009–10	(Brazil) Jymmy França (Sheriff Tiraspol)	4
2010–11	(Ukraine) Volodymyr Kilikevych (Iskra-Stal) (Moldova) Ghenadie Orbu (Dacia Chișinău)	3
2011–12	(Moldova) Ghenadie Orbu (Dacia Chișinău) (Moldova) Maxim Mihaliov (Dacia Chișinău) (Ukraine) Roland Bilala (Tiraspol) (Serbia) Miral Samardžić (Sheriff Tiraspol) (Brazil) Henrique Luvannor (Sheriff Tiraspol)	3
2012–13	(Serbia) Marko Markovski (Sheriff Tiraspol)	3
2013–14	(Brazil) Juninho Potiguar (Sheriff Tiraspol)	5
2014–15	(Moldova) Petru Leucă (Dacia Chișinău)	4
2015–16	(Moldova) Gheorghe Boghiu (Zaria Bălți) (Brazil) Juninho Potiguar (Sheriff Tiraspol)	4
2016–17	(Moldova) Vladislav Ivanov (Sheriff Tiraspol) (Moldova) Vitalie Damașcan (Sheriff Tiraspol) and (Zimbru Chișinău) (Moldova) Igor Picușceac (Zaria Bălți) (Moldova) Gheorghe Anton (Zimbru Chișinău) (Croatia) Josip Ivančić (Sheriff Tiraspol)	4
2017–18	(Moldova) Ion Ursu (Petrocub Hîncești) (Moldova) Roman Șumchin (Petrocub Hîncești) (Moldova) Mihai Plătică (Milsami Orhei)	4
2018–19	(Moldova) Sergiu Istrati (Sfântul Gheorghe Suruceni) (Moldova) Andrei Cobeț (Sheriff Tiraspol)	4
2019–20	(Belarus) Yury Kendysh (Sheriff Tiraspol)	6
2020–21	(Moldova) Artiom Puntus (Milsami Orhei) (Colombia) Frank Castañeda (Sheriff Tiraspol)	4
2021–22	(Moldova) Dumitru Bodiu (Ocnița) (Moldova) Ion Mahu (Congaz) (Moldova) Ivan Lacusta (Speranța Drochia) (Ukraine) Roman Rostokin (Olimp Comrat) (Moldova) Andrei Diordiev (Saksan) (Burkina Faso) Cedric Badolo (Sheriff Tiraspol)	4
2022–23	(Moldova) Nicolai Copușciu (Socol Copceac)	4
2023–24	(Moldova) Mihai Platica (Petrocub Hîncești) (Nigeria) Emmanuel Alaribe (Zimbru Chișinău)	5
2024–25	(Moldova) Florin Cojocaru (FCM Ungheni)	8
2025–26	(Moldova) Adrian Dodan (FC Național Ialoveni)	6

== Winners during the Soviet era ==
- 1945: Dinamo Chişinău – Tiraspol XI 2–1
- 1946: Dinamo Chişinău – Spartak Chişinău 3–2
- 1947: Dinamo Chişinău – Dinamo Bender 3–0
- 1948: Bender XI – Burevestnik Bender 2–1
- 1949: Lokomotiv Chişinău – Spartak Bălți 2–1
- 1950: Burevestnik Bender – Krasnoe Znamya Chişinău 9–0
- 1951: Trud Chişinău – Krasnaya Zvezda Tiraspol 8–0, 3–2
- 1952: Dinamo Chişinău – Krasnoe Znamya Chişinău 6–1
- 1953: Dinamo Chişinău – Burevestnik Bender 2–1
- 1954: Lokomotiv Ungheni – Burevestnik Bender 5–2
- 1955: Burevestnik Bender – KPKhI Chişinău 2–0
- 1956: Burevestnik Bender – KPKhI Chişinău 1–0
- 1957: KPKhI Chişinău – Spartak Tiraspol 3–0
- 1958: Lokomotiv Chişinău – Urozhai Rîbniţa 5–1
- 1959: KPKhI Chişinău – Konservnyi Zavod Tiraspol 2–2, 4–1
- 1960: KPKhI Chişinău – Tiraspol XI 1–0
- 1961: Moldavkabel Bender – Raipromkombinat Lipcani 5–3
- 1962: Moldavkabel Bender – Vibropribor Chişinău 1–0
- 1963: Volna Chişinău – Uzina mecanică Dubăsari 6–1
- 1964: Temp Tiraspol – Lokomotiv Bălți 2–1
- 1965: Traktor Chişinău – Temp Tiraspol 4–2
- 1966: Vibropribor Chişinău – Temp Tiraspol 1–0
- 1967: Traktor Chişinău – Energia Tiraspol (Awarded) (Note: Energia Tiraspol won the final 3–0 but had fielded an ineligible player, so the cup was awarded to Tractorul Chișinău (Traktor Chişinău).)
- 1968: Temp Tiraspol – Stroitel Bălți 5–0
- 1969: Temp Tiraspol – Vibropribor Chişinău 5–1
- 1970: Pishchevik Bender – Trud Bălți 2–1
- 1971: Pishchevik Bender – Stroitel Bălți 4–2
- 1972: Pishchevik Bender – Avtomobilist Orhei 2–0
- 1973: Politekhnik Chişinău – Pishchevik Bender 4–2
- 1974: Dinamo Chişinău – Chaika Bender 4–0
- 1975: Dinamo Chişinău – Energetic Dubăsari 6–2
- 1976: Stroitel Tiraspol – Urozhai Édineţ 1–0
- 1977: Grănicerul Glodeni – Stroitel Tiraspol 2–0
- 1978: KPKhI Chişinău – Avtomobilist Bălți 2–0
- 1979: Kolos Pelinia – Kolos Slobozia 4–2
- 1980: Dnestr Ciobruciu – Chaika Bender 4–1
- 1981–1983: no tournament
- 1984: Luch Soroca – Tekstilshik Tiraspol 2–0
- 1985: Tekstilshik Tiraspol – Iscra Rîbniţa 1–1 aet (4–2 pen)
- 1986: Stroitel Făleşti – Avtomobilist Tiraspol 1–0
- 1987: Stroitel Făleşti – Plastic Tiraspol 4–1
- 1988: FC Tighina – Cristalul Făleşti 7–0
- 1989: FC Tighina-2 – Cristalul Făleşti 4–3 aet
- 1990: Moldavgidromash Chişinău – Cristalul Făleşti 1–0
- 1991: Moldova Borosenii Noi – Constructorul Chişinău 2–0

== Performance by club ==
Club	Winners	Runners-up	Winning Years
Sheriff Tiraspol	14	3	1999, 2001, 2002, 2006, 2008, 2009, 2010, 2015, 2017, 2019, 2022, 2023, 2025, 2026
Zimbru Chişinău	6	5	1997, 1998, 2003, 2004, 2007, 2014
Tiligul-Tiras Tiraspol	3	2	1993, 1994, 1995
Tiraspol	3	2	1996, 2000, 2013
Milsami Orhei	2	2	2012, 2018
Petrocub Hîncești	2	–	2020, 2024
Nistru Otaci	1	8	2005
Sfântul Gheorghe	1	3	2021
Bălți	1	3	2016
Bugeac Comrat	1	–	1992
Iskra-Stal	1	–	2011
Dacia Chişinău	–	4	–
Dinamo Chişinău	–	1	–
CSCA–Rapid	–	1	–
Veris Drăgăneşti	–	1	–

- Clubs in italics no longer exist.
