= 2002–03 Moldovan National Division =

Moldovan National Division
- Season: 2002–03
- Champions: Sheriff Tiraspol
- Relegated: Politehnica Chișinău
- Champions League: Sheriff Tiraspol
- UEFA Cup: Zimbru Chișinău; Nistru Otaci
- Intertoto Cup: Dacia Chișinău
- Top goalscorer: Sergiu Dadu (19 goals)

The 2002–03 Moldovan National Division (Romanian: Divizia Națională) was the 12th season of top-tier football in Moldova.

== Overview ==
It was contested by 8 teams and Sheriff Tiraspol won the championship.

== League standings ==
Pos	Team	Pld	W	D	L	GF	GA	GD	Pts	Qualification
1	Sheriff Tiraspol (C)	24	19	3	2	64	15	+49	60	Qualification for the Champions League first qualifying round
2	Zimbru Chișinău	24	15	5	4	47	20	+27	50	Qualification for the UEFA Cup qualifying round
3	Nistru Otaci	24	13	3	8	33	24	+9	42	Qualification for the UEFA Cup qualifying round
4	Dacia Chișinău	24	8	8	8	24	28	−4	32	Qualification for the Intertoto Cup first round
5	Tiraspol (Note: Constructorul-93 changed name to FC Tiraspol and were relocated from Cioburciu to Tiraspol.)	24	7	5	12	27	38	−11	26	
6	Agro Chișinău	24	4	8	12	13	33	−20	20	
7	Politehnica Chișinău (R)	24	1	2	21	8	58	−50	5	Qualification for the relegation play-off
–	Hîncesti (D, R)	0	–	–	–	–	–	—	0 (Note: Hîncesti withdrew from the league in the winter break and their results were annulled; their record was: 14 / 0 / 0 / 14 / 4-36 / 0)	withdrew

Source: rsssf.com
(C) Champions; (D) Withdrew; (R) Relegated

== Results ==
=== First and second round ===
Home \ Away	AGR	DAC	NIS	POL	SHE	TIR	ZIM
Agro Chișinău		0–0	0–0	1–0	0–2	3–0	0–0
Dacia Chișinău	0–0		1–0	3–0	1–2	1–0	1–3
Nistru Otaci	1–1	3–2		6–1	1–0	2–1	0–1
Politehnica Chișinău	0–1	0–1	0–3		0–4	2–1	0–5
Sheriff Tiraspol	2–0	3–0	3–1	3–0		4–1	3–2
Tiraspol	1–0	1–1	2–0	2–0	2–4		1–2
Zimbru Chișinău	3–0	0–0	1–0	3–1	0–0	5–2	

Source: EU-Football.info
Legend: Blue = home team win; Yellow = draw; Red = away team win.

=== Third and fourth round ===
Home \ Away	AGR	DAC	NIS	POL	SHE	TIR	ZIM
Agro Chișinău		1–2	1–4	1–0	0–3	1–1	0–2
Dacia Chișinău	0–0		0–0	2–0	1–2	0–0	2–2
Nistru Otaci	3–1	2–1		2–0	1–0	1–0	1–0
Politehnica Chișinău	1–1	1–2	0–2		0–0	1–2	0–1
Sheriff Tiraspol	4–0	3–0	4–0	6–0		2–0	3–0
Tiraspol	2–0	0–3	1–0	2–0	4–4		1–1
Zimbru Chișinău	2–1	5–0	3–0	4–1	1–3	1–0	

Source: EU-Football.info
Legend: Blue = home team win; Yellow = draw; Red = away team win.

== Relegation/promotion play-off ==
16 June 2003

Unisport-Auto Chișinău	2–0	Politehnica Chișinău

Chișinău

== Top goalscorers ==
Pos.	Player	Club	Goals
1	(Moldova) Sergiu Dadu	FC Tiraspol/Sheriff Tiraspol	19
2	(Uzbekistan) Vladimir Shishelov	Zimbru Chișinău	13
2	(Romania) Cristian Tudor	Sheriff Tiraspol	13
4	(Ukraine) Andriy Nesteruk	Sheriff Tiraspol	12
