= Republican Stadium (Chișinău) =

Stadium in Moldavia

Coordinates: 47.012391°N 28.839455°E

- Stadionul Republican
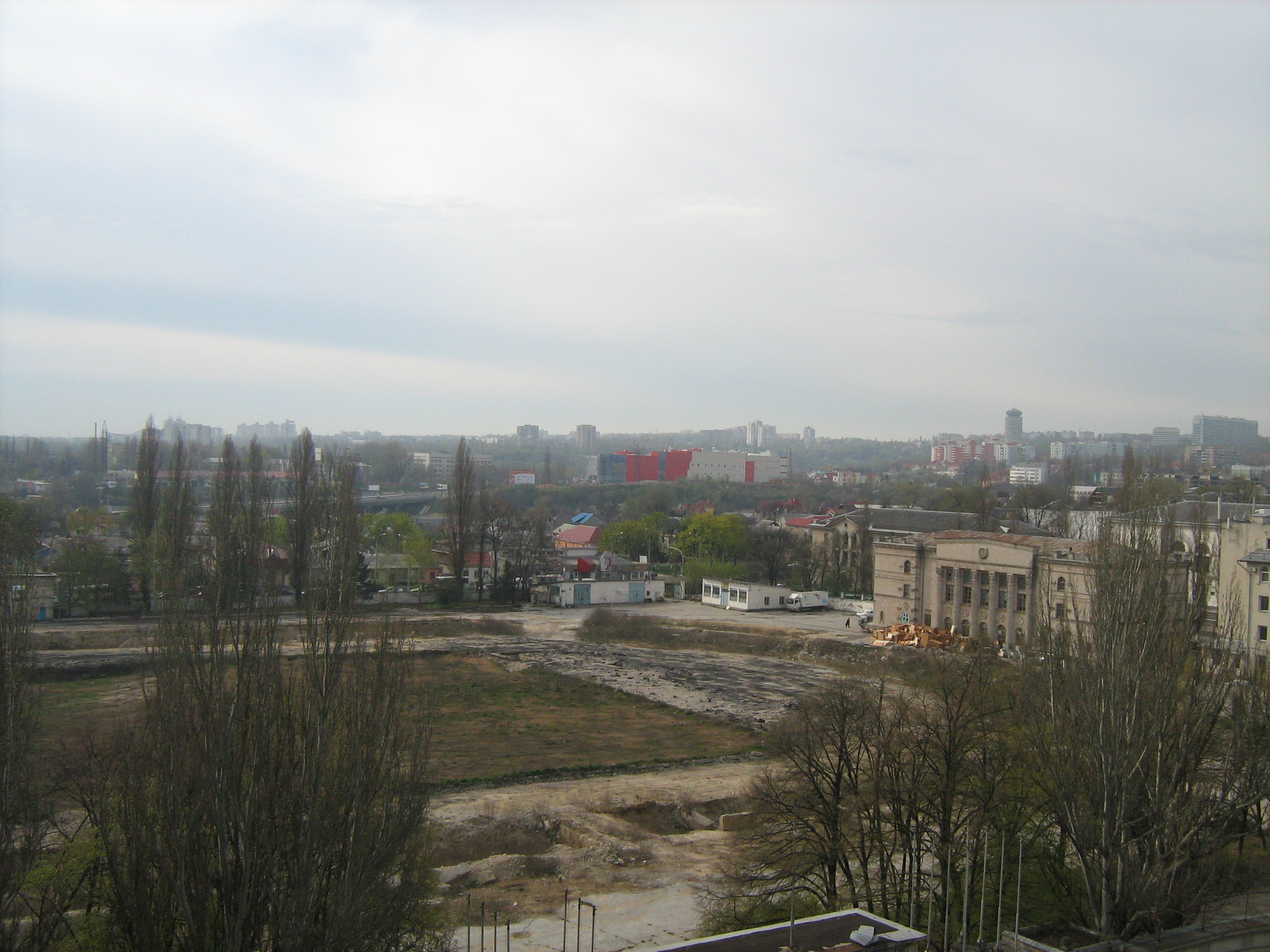
- Interactive map of Republican Stadium
- Location: Chișinău, Moldova

Construction
- Opened: 1952
- Demolished: 2007

Tenants
- Moldova national football team Dacia Chișinău; Zimbru Chișinău

The Republican Stadium (Romanian: Stadionul Republican) was a multi-purpose stadium in Chişinău, Moldova. It was used mostly for football matches. The stadium held 21,160 people, was built in 1952 and demolished in 2007.

In 1986 it hosted the final of Soviet League Cup between Dnipro Dnipropetrovsk and Zenit Leningrad.
