= FC Energhetic Dubăsari =

Energhetic Dubăsari
- Full name: Fotbal Club Energhetic Dubăsari
- Founded: 1996
- Dissolved: 2007
- Ground: Stadionul Municipal; Dubăsari, Republic of Moldova
- Capacity: 3000

Energhetic Dubăsari was a football club from Dubăsari, Republic of Moldova. It was founded in 1996 and played in the 1999–2000 season of the Moldovan National Division. In 2007 the club was dissolved.
