= FC Tiraspol =

Association football club in Moldova

Tiraspol
- Full name: Football Club Tiraspol
- Founded: 1992 (as Constructorul Chișinău); 2001 (FC Tiraspol)
- Dissolved: 2015
- Ground: Sheriff Stadium
- Capacity: 14,300
- 2014–15: Divizia Naţională, 4th of 11 (withdrew)
Home colours	Away colours

FC Tiraspol was a Moldovan football club based in Tiraspol, Moldova. They played in the Divizia Naţională, the top division in Moldovan football.

Founded in 1992 as Constructorul Chișinău, it entered the Moldovan National Division in the 1995–96 season, winning its only title in the 1996–97 and Moldovan Cups in 1996 and 2000. The club then relocated in 2001 to Cioburciu before moving to Tiraspol the year after. Despite the latter two settlements being in the breakaway republic of Transnistria, their clubs play in the Moldovan league system.

== History ==
=== Constructorul Chișinău ===
The side was founded in 1992 as Constructorul Chișinău, and played in Chișinău, the Moldovan capital. It entered the Moldovan National Division in the 1995–96 season. Constructorul won their first silverware, the 1996 Moldovan Cup with a 2–1 win over Tiligul Tiraspol, and the next season won their only Moldovan National Division title by denying city rivals Zimbru Chișinău a sixth consecutive triumph. The league triumph earned Constructorul a place in the 1997-98 UEFA Champions League, where they were knocked out by Belarusian club MPKC Mozyr 4–3 on aggregate in the first qualifying round. In 2000, Constructorul won their second Cup, by beating Zimbru 1–0 in the final on 24 May.

The club also participated in the UEFA Cup during the Constructorul era. In September 2000, the club was banned from appearing in European competitions for a year following a number of security breaches in a home match against Bulgarian side CSKA Sofia.

The first FC Tiraspol chairman was Valeriu Rotari (1947–2000), a businessman accused of organized crime gang activities. Thanks to Rotari, the club managed to achieve his first National Division titles. The murder of Rotari on February 16, 2000, was one of the reasons the club's further performance was much worse than in the 1990s.

=== Move to Transnistria ===
Before the 2001–02 season, the club relocated to Cioburciu, a small village outside Tiraspol, the capital of the breakaway republic of Transnistria, and was renamed Constructorul Cioburciu. The following season, the club moved into Tiraspol and became its current entity. The club has not won a Cup or National Division title since leaving Chișinău.

The only major European campaign since leaving Chișinău was the 2004-05 UEFA Cup. The club defeated Armenian team Shirak in the first qualifying round (4–1 on aggregate) before a 5–1 aggregate elimination by Metalurh Donetsk of Ukraine in the next round.

== Past crests ==
FC Constructorul Chişinău (1993–01)

== Honours ==
- Divizia Naţională (1): 1996–97
- Moldovan Cup (3): 1995–96, 1999–2000, 2012–13
- Moldovan "A" Division (1): 1994–95
- Moldovan "B" Division (1): 1993–94

== List of seasons ==
Until 2001, the club was known as Constructorul Chișinău, in 2001–02 as Constructorul Cioburciu, and FC Tiraspol since 2002.

Season	Div	Pos	Pl	W	D	L	GS	GA	P	Cup	Europe		Notes
1993–94	3D	1	20	20	0	0	79	11	40	Round of 16			Promoted
1994–95	2D	1	36	28	4	4	103	20	88	Quarter-finalists			Promoted
1995–96	1D	3	30	24	2	4	71	16	74	Winner			
1996–97	1D	1	30	26	3	1	82	10	81	Round of 32	CWC	1st Round	
1997–98	1D	3	26	17	3	6	54	32	54	Runner-up	UCL	1st qualifying round	
1998–99	1D	2	26	15	6	5	30	13	51	Runner-up	CWC	qualifying round	
1999–00	1D	3	36	18	11	7	52	23	65	Winner	UC	qualifying round	
2000–01	1D	4	28	10	9	9	30	30	39	Semi-finalists	UC	qualifying round	
2001–02	1D	4	28	10	7	11	36	42	39	Quarter-finalists			
2002–03	1D	5	24	7	5	12	27	38	26	Semi-finalists	Intertoto	1st Round	
2003–04	1D	4	28	12	9	7	32	22	45	Quarter-finalists			
2004–05	1D	4	28	12	8	8	41	23	44	Quarter-finalists	UC	2nd qualifying round	
2005–06	1D	3	28	8	13	7	24	21	37	Quarter-finalists			
2006–07	1D	5	36	10	16	10	37	32	46	Semi-finalists	Intertoto	3rd Round	
2007–08	1D	4	30	16	7	7	36	21	55	Semi-finalists			
2008–09	1D	7	30	9	5	16	30	36	32	Semi-finalists	Intertoto	2nd Round	
2009–10	1D	9	33	8	10	15	20	34	34	Quarter-finalists			
2010–11	1D	7	39	17	6	16	57	45	57	Quarter-finalists			
2011–12	1D	6	33	10	12	11	36	32	42	Quarter-finalists			
2012–13	1D	3	33	18	10	5	54	20	64	Winner			
2013–14	1D	2	33	21	9	3	60	27	72	Quarter-finalists	UEL	Round 1	
2014–15	1D	4	24	14	2	8	49	28	44	Semi-finalists	UEL	Round 1	

== European record ==
UEFA Champions League

Season	Round	Opponents	Home leg	Away leg	Aggregate
1997–98	1	(Belarus) MPKC Mozyr	1–1	2–3	3–4

UEFA Europa League

Season	Round	Opponents	Home leg	Away leg	Aggregate
1999–00	1	(Hungary) Ferencváros	1–1	1–3	2–4
2000–01	1	(Bulgaria) CSKA Sofia	2–3	0–8	2–11
2004–05	1	(Armenia) Shirak	2–1	2–0	4–1
2004–05	2	(Ukraine) Metalurh Donetsk	1–2	0–3	1–5
2013–14	1	(Latvia) Skonto FC	0–1	1–0	1–1 (2–4 p)
2014–15	1	(Azerbaijan) Inter Baku	2–3	1–3	3–6

UEFA Intertoto Cup

Season	Round	Opponents	Home leg	Away leg	Aggregate
2002	1	(Czech Republic) Synot	0–0	0–4	0–4
2006	1	(Azerbaijan) FK MKT Araz Imisli	2–0	0–1	2–1
2006	2	(Poland) Lech Poznań	3–1	1–0	4–1
2006	3	(Austria) SV Ried	1–1	1–3	2–4
2008	1	(Armenia) Mika	0–0	2–2	2–2 (a)
2008	2	(Ukraine) Tavriya Simferopol	0–0	1–3	1–3

UEFA Cup Winners' Cup

Season	Round	Opponents	Home leg	Away leg	Aggregate
1996–97	1	(Israel) Hapoel Iorni Rishon LeZion	1–0	2–3	3–3 (a)
1996–97	2	(Turkey) Galatasaray	0–1	0–4	0–5
1998–99	1	(Slovenia) Rudar Velenje	0–0	0–2	0–2

== Managers ==
- (Moldova) Alexandru Mațiura (1996–1998)
- (Ukraine) Ihor Nadein (1998–1999)
- (Moldova) Dumitru Chihaev (1999)
- (Moldova) Ion Caras (1999–Jun, 2000)
- (Romania) Dumitru Borcău (Jul, 2000)
- (Moldova) Ilie Vieru (2000–Jan, 2001)
- (Moldova) Nicolae Mandricenco (Jan, 2001–Aug, 2001)
- (Ukraine) Oleksandr Holokolosov (Aug, 2001–Oct, 2001)
- (Ukraine) Yuriy Kulish (2001–2002)
- (Ukraine) Ihor Nakonechnyi (2002–Jun, 2003)
- (Moldova) Alexandru Mațiura (2003–2004)
- (Moldova) Victor Barîșev (2004)
- (Ukraine) Yuriy Kulish (Dec 21, 2004–Aug, 2006)
- (Ukraine) Volodymyr Reva (Aug, 2006 – Dec 1, 2008)
- (Moldova) Emil Caras (Dec 1, 2008 – June 30, 2009)
- (Belarus) Sergey Yasinsky (July 1, 2009 – Dec 31, 2009)
- (Moldova) Iurie Blonari (Jan 1, 2010 – Dec 31, 2010)
- (Moldova) Vlad Goian (Jan 1, 2011–Dec, 2014)
- (Moldova) Lilian Popescu (Dec 15, 2014–2015)
