= FC Politehnica UTM Chișinău =

Politehnica UTM
- Full name: Fotbal Club Politehnica UTM
- Founded: 1964
- Ground: UTM Stadium
- Capacity: 2,000
- President: Radu Rebeja
- Head coach: Eugen Molovata
- League: Liga
- 2025–26 2025–26: Liga, 7th of 8 (relegated); Liga 1, 1st of 6 (promoted)
Home colours	Away colours

UTM Stadium in 2026

FC Politehnica UTM is a Moldovan football club based in Chișinău. They play in the Moldovan Liga, the top tier of Moldovan football. Saksan became Politehnica UTM before 2025–26 season.

== Squad ==
As of 2 August 2026

Note: Flags indicate national team as defined under FIFA eligibility rules; some limited exceptions apply. Players may hold more than one non-FIFA nationality.

No.	Pos.	Nation	Player
2	DF	MDA	Igor Arhirii
7	MF	MDA	Artur Sprinsean
8	MF	MDA	Alexandru Mardari
9	FW	MDA	Vladislav Dinu
10	MF	CMR	Yvan Noh Nafeng
11	MF	CMR	Isidore Doumbe
13	GK	MDA	Artur Tuev
15	DF	MDA	Mihail Cojusea
16	DF	MDA	Mihail Țîpac
18	DF	MDA	Alexandru Negură

No.	Pos.	Nation	Player
19	DF	MDA	Dumitru Marciuc
20	FW	SLE	Samuel Gandi
21	MF	MDA	Daniel Cucer
22	DF	MDA	Nichita Lipcan
23	DF	MDA	Danil Andreiciu
25	GK	MDA	Dan Strainu
31	FW	MDA	Nicolae Țelic
72	GK	MDA	Pavel Socolov
77	DF	ISR	Tomer Katz
99	MF	MDA	Evgheni Usatenco
