= List of FC Zimbru Chișinău seasons =

This is a list of every season played by Zimbru Chișinău in national football, from 1947 (the year the club was officially founded) to the most recently completed season.

== Former names ==
Throughout history, the club has been known by various names.

- Dinamo – 1947—1949
- Burevestnik – 1950—1957
- Moldova – 1958—1965
- Avântul – 1966
- Moldova – 1967—1971
- Nistru – 1972—1990
- Zimbru – 1991—present

== Key ==
Soviet Union

- 1. Soviet Top League = Class A 1956–1962, Class A (First group) 1963–1964, Higher League 1974, 1983.
- 2. Soviet First League = Second group 1947–1949, Class B 1950–1955, Class A (Second group) 1965–1969,
  Class A (First group) 1970, First League 1971–1973, 1975–1982, 1984–1986, 1989–1991.
- 3. Soviet Second League = Second League 1987–1988.

Moldova

- 1. Liga = Superliga 1992, Liga Națională 1992–1996, Divizia Națională 1996–2022, Super Liga 2022–2025, Liga 2025–present.

League

- Pos./T = Position/Teams
- P = Games played
- W = Games won
- D = Games drawn
- L = Games lost
- GF = Goals for
- GA = Goals against
- Pts = Points
- Cup Q = Qualifying round

Champions	Runners-up	3rd place	Promoted	Relegated

Europe

- PR = Preliminary round
- PO = Play-off round
- QR = Qualifying round
- R1 = Round 1
- R2 = Round 2

Soviet Union

== League and Cup history ==
Season	Level	League(s) (name)	Pos./T	P	W	D	L	GF	GA	Pts	Season	Cup
1947	2nd	Second group, Ukrainian SSR zone	13/(13)	24	2	5	17	21	61	9	1947	Q
1948	2nd	Second group, Ukr. SSR zone, subgroup B	7/(8)	14	1	2	11	11	35	4	1948	–
1949	2nd	Second group, subgroup Union Republics	11/(14)	26	7	2	17	36	64	16	1949	Q
1950	2nd	Class B	6/(14)	26	11	6	9	41	41	28	1950	1/8
1951	2nd	Class B	10/(18)	34	12	10	12	47	37	34	1951	1/16
1952	2nd	Class B, subgroup Baku	2/(5)	4	1	2	1	4	4	4	1952	1/32
1952 (2nd stage)	2nd	Class B, for 1-9 places	8/(18)	16	6	3	7	21	27	15	1952	1/32
1953	2nd	Class B, zone 2	6/(10)	17	4	8	5	14	20	16	1953	1/32
1953 (2nd stage)	2nd	Class B, for 16-18 places	16/(27)	2	1	1	0	5	2	3	1953	1/32
1954	2nd	Class B, zone 3	12/(12)	22	2	8	12	26	40	12	1954	1/8
1955	2nd	Class B, zone 1	1/(16)	30	20	6	4	86	46	46	1955	Q
1956	1st	Class A	6/(12)	22	9	5	8	38	49	23	–	
1957	1st	Class A	9/(12)	22	4	10	8	24	36	18	1957	1/16
1958	1st	Class A	11/(12)	22	3	9	10	25	47	15	1958	1/8
1959	1st	Class A	10/(12)	22	6	5	11	22	45	17	1959–60	1/8
1960	1st	Class A, group 1	10/(11)	20	4	5	11	18	34	13	1959–60	1/8
1960 (2nd stage)	1st	Class A, for 19-22 places	22/(22)	6	1	3	2	10	6	5	1959–60	1/8
1961	1st	Class A, group B	9/(11)	20	6	4	10	30	36	16	1961	1/32
1961 (2nd stage)	1st	Class A, for 11-22 places	16/(22)	12	6	2	4	16	18	14	1961	1/32
1962	1st	Class A, group A	5/(11)	20	8	5	7	27	25	21	1962	1/16
1962 (2nd stage)	1st	Class A, for 1-12 places	12/(22)	12	1	2	9	9	19	4	1962	1/16
1963	1st	Class A (First group)	13/(20)	38	8	16	14	27	43	32	1963	1/4
1964	1st	Class A (First group)	17/(17)	32	6	6	20	15	44	18	1964	1/16
1965	2nd	Class A (Second group), subgroup 1	5/(16)	30	12	8	10	20	18	32	1965	1/32
1965 (2nd stage)	2nd	Class A (Second group), for 1-16 places	14/(32)	16	4	4	8	11	19	12	1965	1/32
1966	2nd	Class A (Second group), subgroup 2	13/(18)	34	8	15	11	23	29	31	1965–66	1/16
1967	2nd	Class A (Second group), subgroup 2	5/(20)	38	15	15	8	30	19	45	1966–67	1/32
1968	2nd	Class A (Second group), subgroup 1	9/(21)	40	16	12	12	40	36	44	1967–68	1/16
1969	2nd	Class A (Second group), subgroup 4	6/(21)	40	14	16	10	36	23	44	1969	Q
1970	2nd	Class A (First group)	11/(22)	42	13	15	14	40	34	41	1970	1/64
1971	2nd	First League	17/(22)	42	12	14	16	35	42	38	1971	1/16
1972	2nd	First League	12/(20)	38	11	12	15	39	49	34	1972	1/32
1973	2nd	First League	2/(20)	38	25	7	6	71	35	52	1973	1/16
1974	1st	Higher League	16/(16)	30	4	8	18	32	59	16	1974	1/16
1975	2nd	First League	6/(20)	38	17	9	12	44	43	43	1975	1/16
1976	2nd	First League	5/(20)	38	15	14	9	51	40	44	1976	1/16
1977	2nd	First League	11/(20)	38	11	14	13	45	51	36	1977	1/16
1978	2nd	First League	10/(20)	38	13	11	14	42	40	37	1978	1/16
1979	2nd	First League	8/(24)	46	18	14	14	53	51	48	1979	Q
1980	2nd	First League	8/(24)	46	20	8	18	60	55	48	1980	1/8
1981	2nd	First League	8/(24)	46	17	12	17	54	51	46	1981	Q
1982	2nd	First League	2/(22)	42	23	10	9	67	38	56	1982	Q
1982; Final	2nd	First League, Final for 1-2 places	2/(22)	1	0	0	1	0	1	0	1982	Q
1983	1st	Higher League	18/(18)	34	3	4	27	19	73	10	1983	1/16
1984	2nd	First League	18/(22)	42	13	12	17	45	58	38	1984	1/16
1985	2nd	First League, West zone	11/(11)	20	5	3	12	16	35	13	1984–85	1/16
1985 (2nd stage)	2nd	First League, group B for 13-22 places	19/(22)	18	7	5	6	22	19	19	1985–86	1/32
1986	2nd	First League	24/(24)	46	6	9	31	31	101	21	1986–87	1/32
1987	3rd	Second League, zone 5	1/(18)	34	22	8	4	52	17	52	1987–88	1/64
1987 (Final)	3rd	Second League, Final C for 1-3 places	2/(3)	4	2	0	2	5	3	4	1987–88	1/64
1988	3rd	Second League, zone 5	1/(18)	34	21	11	2	84	34	53	1988–89	1/16
1988 (Final)	3rd	Second League, Final A for 1-3 places	1/(3)	4	3	1	0	7	3	7	1988–89	1/16
1989	2nd	First League	10/(22)	42	19	5	18	45	59	43	1989–90	1/64
1990	2nd	First League	7/(20)	38	14	12	12	50	44	40	1990–91	1/64
1991	2nd	First League	19/(22)	42	11	13	18	36	49	35	1991–92	1/64

Notes: 2 points for a win, 1 point for a draw, 0 points for a loss.

- In the table above, in the 2nd stage of the seasons 1961, 1962, 1965, 1985, only the number of games played by Zimbru in this part of the league are shown.
- In the seasons 1961 and 1985, all the results of the 1st stage have been taken into account for the 2nd stage.
- In the season 1962, only the results with teams that finished in the top 6 (1st stage) have been taken into account for the 2nd stage.
- In the season 1965, only the results with teams that finished in the top 8 (1st stage) have been taken into account for the 2nd stage.
- The complete table for these four seasons are shown below.

Season	Level	League(s) (name)	Pos./T	P	W	D	L	GF	GA	Pts
1961	1st	Class A	16/(22)	32	12	6	14	46	54	30
1962	1st	Class A	12/(22)	22	3	5	14	20	35	11
1965	2nd	Class A (Second group)	14/(32)	30	7	9	14	16	29	23
1985	2nd	First League	19/(22)	38	12	8	18	38	54	32

- In 1973, a new rule was introduced that lasted only one season. According to the new regulation, in the case of draw, the winner of the match had to be decided by a penalty shoot-out. The winner of the penalty shoot-out received 1 point (instead of 2 for a win in 90 minutes). The loser received no points. In the 1973 season, seven games were decided on penalties. Zimbru won twice and lost five times. The total number of points in the season was 52 (50 points earned for 25 wins in the regular time, and 2 points after penalty shoot-outs).
- In the overall season statistics, these seven games are counted as draws.
- In 1978, a draw limit rule was introduced. This restriction was abolished at the end of 1988 season. The only time Zimbru was affected by this rule was in the 1979 season. The limit for points awarded for draws earned was 12. For 2 draws that exceeded the limit, Zimbru earn no points.

== Soviet play-off ==
- Three times, Zimbru defended their right to play in the Soviet First League (Class B in those years) by taking part in the playoff matches. The regulation that was introduced in 1950 and abolished in 1957 stated that the team that became the champion of the Moldavian SSR would play in play-off games against the other team from Moldavian SSR which already played in Class A or B, and took the lowest place in the league. However, in the early 1950s, Zimbru was the only team that represented Moldavian SSR in the Soviet League, so the final place in the Class B table did not matter for the playoffs. These play-off matches were not always held; they were played only at the discretion of the Moldavian SSR national committee. The playoff rule was active for eight seasons, but was applied only three times. The results of the Burevestnik team (now called Zimbru) are shown below.
- 1950 Burevestnik – Krasnoe Znamya (Chișinău) – 7–2, 3–1.
- 1951 Burevestnik – Krasnaya Zvezda (Tiraspol) – 8–0, 3–2.
- 1954 Burevestnik – Institutul Agricol (Chișinău) – 1–2, 3–0, – (the opponent refused to play the decisive match).
- In the overall season statistics the play-off matches are not counted.

== Overall season statistics in the Soviet Union ==
Competition	S	P	W	D	L	GF	GA	GD
Soviet Top League	11	312	69	84	159	312	534	–222
Soviet First League	32	1154	406	322	426	1318	1416	–98
Soviet Second League	2	76	48	20	8	148	57	+91
Total	45	1542	523	426	593	1778	2007	–229

Competition	S	P	W	D	L	GF	GA	GD
Soviet Cup/USSR Cup	43	103	37	15	51	134	143	–9

Moldova

== League history ==
Season	Div.	Pos./Teams	P	W	D	L	GS	GA	Pts	Cup	Europe		Manager(s)	League goalscorer(s)	Goals
1992	1st	**1**/(12)	22	15	5	2	40	15	35	1/4	—		(Moldova) Sergiu Sîrbu	(Moldova) Alexandru Spiridon (Moldova) Iurie Miterev	8
1992– 93	1st	**1**/(16)	30	22	6	2	66	17	50	1/8	—		(Moldova) Sergiu Sîrbu	(Moldova) Alexandru Spiridon	12
1993– 94	1st	**1**/(16)	30	25	2	3	86	22	52	1/2	UCL	PR	(Moldova) Sergiu Sîrbu (Moldova) Veaceslav Chiricenco (Moldova) Alexandru Spiridon	(Moldova) Serghei Cleșcenco	14
1994– 95	1st	**1**/(14)	26	21	4	1	69	10	67	RU	UC	PR	(Moldova) Alexandru Spiridon	(Moldova) Serghei Cleșcenco	11
1995– 96	1st	**1**/(16)	30	26	3	1	110	11	81	1/4	UC	R2	(Moldova) Alexandru Spiridon	(Moldova) **Vladislav Gavriliuc**	34
1996– 97	1st	**2**/(16)	30	22	4	4	112	21	70	W	UC	PR	(Moldova) Alexandru Spiridon (Moldova) Ion Caras	(Moldova) Iurie Miterev	34
1997– 98	1st	**1**/(14)	26	22	3	1	75	8	69	W	UCWC	QR	(Ukraine) Semen Altman	(Moldova) **Serghei Cleșcenco**	25
1998– 99	1st	**1**/(10)	26	18	7	1	43	9	61	1/4	UCL	QR1	(Ukraine) Semen Altman	(Moldova) Vladislav Gavriliuc	10
1999– 00	1st	**1**/(10)	36	25	7	4	78	21	82	RU	UCL; UC	QR3; R1	(Ukraine) Semen Altman (Ukraine) Oleksandr Skrypnyk	(Moldova) Victor Berco	15
2000– 01	1st	**2**/(8)	28	20	6	2	46	15	66	1/2	UCL; UC	QR3; R1	(Moldova) Alexandru Spiridon (Moldova) Vladimir Veber	(Moldova) Iurie Miterev	8
2001– 02	1st	**3**/(8)	28	12	10	6	52	20	46	1/2	UC	QR	(Moldova) Vladimir Veber (Moldova) Nicolae Mandrîcenco (Moldova) Sergiu Sîrbu (Romania) Gabriel Stan	(Moldova) Victor Berco	12
2002– 03	1st	**2**/(7)	24	15	5	4	47	20	50	W	UC	R1	(Romania) Gabriel Stan	(Uzbekistan) Vladimir Shishelov	13
2003– 04	1st	**3**/(8)	28	14	7	7	40	23	49	W	UC	R1	(Moldova) Sergiu Sîrbu (Romania) Gheorghe Niculescu	(Uzbekistan) **Vladimir Shishelov**	15
2004– 05	1st	**5**/(8)	28	12	7	9	29	15	43	1/4	—		(Romania) Gheorghe Niculescu (Moldova) Ivan Tabanov	(Moldova) Sergiu Chirilov	7
2005– 06	1st	**2**/(8)	28	15	8	5	47	20	53	1/2	—		(Moldova) Ivan Tabanov	(Moldova) Sergiu Chirilov	11
2006– 07	1st	**2**/(10)	36	21	8	7	63	23	71	W	UC	QR2	(Moldova) Ivan Tabanov (Moldova) Alexandru Curteian	(Russia) Aleksei Zhdanov	14
2007– 08	1st	**5**/(11)	30	13	13	4	43	21	52	1/2	UC	QR1	(Ukraine) Oleksandr Sevidov	(Russia) Aleksei Zhdanov	12
2008– 09	1st	**4**/(11)	30	13	7	10	42	30	46	1/2	—		(Moldova) Ion Caras (Moldova) Ivan Tabanov	(Moldova) **Oleg Andronic**	16
2009– 10	1st	**4**/(12)	33	17	8	8	47	29	59	1/4	UEL	QR2	(Moldova) Ivan Tabanov	(Moldova) Andrei Secrieru	7
2010– 11	1st	**4**/(14)	39	22	10	7	56	20	76	1/8	—		(Moldova) Ivan Tabanov	(Moldova) Oleg Andronic	9
2011– 12	1st	**3**/(12)	33	17	10	6	47	24	61	1/4	—		(Moldova) Serghei Stroenco (Moldova) Oleg Bejenari	(Moldova) Oleg Molla	14
2012– 13	1st	**6**/(12)	33	12	10	11	53	38	46	1/4	UEL	QR2	(Moldova) Oleg Bejenari (Moldova) Sergiu Sîrbu (Moldova) Oleg Fistican (Moldova) Serghei Dubrovin (Moldova) Serghei Cleșcenco	(Moldova) Oleg Molla	7
2013– 14	1st	**4**/(12)	33	18	7	8	56	24	61	W	—		(Moldova) Serghei Cleșcenco (Belarus) Oleg Kubarev	(Russia) Sergey Tsyganov	13
2014– 15	1st	**6**/(9)	24	7	6	11	23	19	27	1/4	UEL	PO	(Belarus) Oleg Kubarev (Moldova) Veaceslav Rusnac	(Moldova) Alexandru Dedov	4
2015– 16	1st	**3**/(10)	27	15	4	8	42	26	49	1/4	—		(Romania) Ștefan Stoica (Moldova) Veaceslav Rusnac (Portugal) Simão Freitas (Moldova) Denis Romanenco (Romania) Flavius Stoican	(Portugal) Rui Miguel	9
2016– 17	1st	**5**/(11)	30	13	7	10	32	29	46	1/2	UEL	QR2	(Romania) Flavius Stoican (Moldova) Veaceslav Rusnac (Romania) Ștefan Stoica	(Portugal) Hugo Neto	6
2017	1st	**8**/(10)	18	5	4	9	17	21	19	RU	—		(Romania) Ștefan Stoica (Moldova) Iurie Osipenco	(Brazil) Jean Theodoro	5
2018	1st	**5**/(8)	28	9	9	10	28	37	36	1/2	—		(Moldova) Vladimir Aga (Moldova) Serghei Secu (Romania) Sorin Colceag	(Moldova) Ilie Damașcan (Moldova) Ion Nicolaescu	5
2019	1st	**7**/(8)	28	3	7	18	16	43	16	1/4	—		(Romania) Sorin Colceag (Moldova) Vladimir Aga (Moldova) Veaceslav Sofroni	(Moldova) Dan Pîslă	5
2020– 21	1st	**8**/(10)	36	6	7	23	39	63	25	1/8	—		(Moldova) Simeon Bulgaru (Moldova) Vlad Goian	(Moldova) Artur Pătraș	10
2021– 22	1st	**7**/(8)	28	7	6	15	32	46	27	1/4	—		(Moldova) Vlad Goian (Italy) Michele Bon	(Moldova) Eugen Sidorenco	5
2022– 23	1st	**3**/(8)	24	7	10	7	27	26	31	1/4	—		(Moldova) Vlad Goian (Moldova) Lilian Popescu	(Moldova) **Alexandru Dedov**	8
2023– 24	1st	**3**/(8)	24	13	3	8	33	23	42	RU	UECL	QR2	(Moldova) Lilian Popescu	(Cape Verde) João Paulino (Nigeria) Emmanuel Alaribe	7
2024– 25	1st	**3**/(8)	24	14	3	7	54	25	45	1/2	UECL	QR2	(Moldova) Lilian Popescu (Turkey) Hikmet Karaman	(Nigeria) Justice Ohajunwa (Moldova) Vlad Răileanu	8
2025– 26	1st	**3**/(8)	31	18	8	5	70	32	62	RU	UECL	QR2	(Belarus) Oleg Kubarev	(Belarus) **Dzianis Kazlouski**	20

Notes: 2 points for a win, 1 point for a draw, 0 points for a loss.
Starting with the 1994–95 season: 3 points for a win, 1 point for a draw, 0 points for a loss.

- Players in **bold** were Top league scorers that season.
- In the 1992 season, both Tiligul Tiraspol and Zimbru finished the league with an equal number of points (35). The Moldovan Football Federation decided that an additional match would be played at a neutral venue, on June 28. The match was scheduled to take place in the city of Bălți. However, due to an armed conflict in the region, Tiligul were unable to travel, so Zimbru were declared champions.

== Relegation play-off ==
- 2022: Spartanii Selemet – Zimbru: 0–1.

== Overall seasons table ==
Including 2025–2026 season

Seasons in Liga	P	W	D	L	GF	GA	GD	Champion	2nd place	3rd place	4th place	5th place	6th place	7th place	8th place
35	1009	534	231	244	1760	846	+914	8	5	8	4	4	2	2	2

== Honours ==
=== Moldova ===
- Liga / Super Liga / Divizia Națională / Liga Națională / Superliga

Champion (8): 1992, 1992–93, 1993–94, 1994–95, 1995–96, 1997–98, 1998–99, 1999–00

Runner-up (5): 1996–97, 2000–01, 2002–03, 2005–06, 2006–07

Third place (8): 2001–02, 2003–04, 2011–12, 2015–16, 2022–23, 2023–24, 2024–25, 2025–26

- Cupa Moldovei

Winner (6): 1996–97, 1997–98, 2002–03, 2003–04, 2006–07, 2013–14
Runner-up (5): 1994–95, 1999–00, 2017–18, 2023–24, 2025–26

- Supercupa Moldovei

Winner (1): 2014
Runner-up (3): 2003, 2004, 2007

=== Soviet Union ===
- Soviet First League

Winner (1): 1955.
Runner-up (2): 1973, 1982.

- Soviet Second League

Winner (1): 1988.
Runner-up (1): 1987

== Records ==
=== Soviet Union ===
- Most overall league appearances: Gheorghe Tegleațov (453)
- Most overall league goals: Ihor Nadein (80)

Soviet Top League

- Most league appearances: Vladimir Țincler (182)
- Most league goals: Yuri Korotkov (27)
- Most league goals in one season: Dmitri Dubrovski –13 (1961 season)
- Biggest league win: Moldova – Kalev Tallinn 6–0 (1960)
- Biggest league defeat: Spartak Moscow – Burevestnik 9–2 (1956), Lokomotiv Moscow – Moldova 8–1 (1958)
  CSK MO Moscow – Moldova 7–0 (1959)

Soviet First League

- Most league appearances: Gheorghe Tegleațov (396)
- Most league goals: Ihor Nadein (77)
- Most league goals in one season: Yuri Korotkov – 31 (1955 season)
- Biggest league win: Burevestnik – Dinamo Tallinn 7–0 (1955)
- Biggest league defeat: Rostselmash Rostov-on-Don – Nistru 7–0 (1986)

Soviet Second League

- Most league appearances: Anatoli Chistov, Sergiu Sîrbu (75)
- Most league goals: Nikolai Vasilyev (44)
- Most league goals in one season: Nikolai Vasilyev – 30 (1988 season)
- Biggest league win: Nistru – Gomselmash Gomel 5–0 (1988)
- Biggest league defeat: Vityaz Vitebsk – Nistru 2–0 (1987), Kuban Krasnodar – Nistru 2–0 (1987)
  Dnepr Mogilev – Nistru 2–0 (1988), Khimik Grodno – Nistru 4–2 (1988)

Soviet Cup

- Biggest cup win: Burevestnik – Institutul Agricol (Chișinău) 8–0 (1955)
- Biggest cup defeat: Spartak Moscow – Burevestnik 7–0 (1950)

=== Moldova ===
Liga

- Most league appearances: Iurie Miterev (248)
- Most league goals: Iurie Miterev (129)
- Most league goals in one season: Vladislav Gavriliuc (1995–96 season) and Iurie Miterev (1996–97 season) – 34
- Biggest league win: Ciuhur Ocnița – Zimbru 1–15 (19 June 1997)
- Biggest league defeat: Sheriff Tiraspol – Zimbru 6–0 (6 November 2021)
- Most straight wins: 12 games (started in 1993–94 season, ended in 1994–95 season)
- Most games without loss: 29 (started in 1998–99 season, ended in 1999–2000 season)
- Most consecutive matches scored in by player: 10 games (1995–96) – Vladislav Gavriliuc
- Longest consecutive run without conceding a goal: 12 games (1153 minutes) – Denis Romanenco, 1998–99 season

Cupa

- Biggest cup win: Zimbru – Vierul Sîngerei 16–0 (1995)
- Biggest cup defeat: Zimbru – Milsami Orhei 0–3 (13 April 2022)

== Statistics ==
Statistics are correct as of 17 May 2026.

=== Most league appearances ===
Soviet Union

Place	Name	Apps
1	(Soviet Union) Gheorghe Tegleațov	453
2	(Soviet Union) Ion Caras	376
3	(Soviet Union) Valeriy Volostnyh	354
4	(Soviet Union) Pavel Cebanu	343
5	(Soviet Union) Anatol Rîbac	319
6	(Soviet Union) Ihor Nadein	311
7	(Soviet Union) Alexandru Mațiura	309
8	(Soviet Union) Sergiu Sîrbu	262
9	(Soviet Union) Vladimir Țincler (Soviet Union) Nicolae Cebotari	258

Moldova

Place	Name	Apps
1	(Moldova) Iurie Miterev	248
2	(Moldova) Boris Cebotari	243
3	(Moldova) Ștefan Burghiu	207
4	(Moldova) Denis Romanenco	203
5	(Moldova) Ion Testemițanu	201
6	(Moldova) Nicolae Calancea	197
7	(Moldova) Radu Rebeja	190
8	(Moldova) Eugen Sidorenco	166
9	(Moldova) Vadim Boreț	159
10	(Romania) Daniel Bălașa	153

=== Most league goals ===
Soviet Union

Place	Name	Goals
1	(Soviet Union) Ihor Nadein	80
2	(Soviet Union) Vyacheslav Protsenko	61
3	(Soviet Union) Yuri Korotkov	58
4	(Soviet Union) Nikolai Vasilyev	52
5	(Soviet Union) Evgeniy Piunovski	50
6	(Soviet Union) Yuri Hlopotnov	48
7	(Soviet Union) Pavel Cebanu	46
8	(Soviet Union) Mihail Muhortov	45
9	(Soviet Union) Alexandru Mațiura (Soviet Union) Anatol Teslev (Soviet Union) Nikolai Mikhailov	43

Moldova

Place	Name	Goals
1	(Moldova) Iurie Miterev	129
2	(Moldova) Vladislav Gavriliuc	79
3	(Moldova) Serghei Cleșcenco	65
4	(Moldova) Boris Cebotari (Moldova) Radu Rebeja	43
6	(Moldova) Alexandru Spiridon	42
7	(Moldova) Sergiu Chirilov	36
8	(Moldova) Victor Berco (Moldova) Oleg Andronic	33
10	(Moldova) Ion Testemițanu	32

=== All-time top scorers ===
Place	Name	Goals
1	(Moldova) Iurie Miterev	129
2	(Soviet Union) Ihor Nadein	80
3	(Moldova) Vladislav Gavriliuc	79
4	(Soviet Union) (Moldova) Serghei Cleșcenco	66
5	(Soviet Union) Vyacheslav Protsenko	61
6	(Soviet Union) Yuri Korotkov	58
7	(Soviet Union) (Moldova) Alexandru Spiridon	56
8	(Soviet Union) Nikolai Vasilyev	52
9	(Soviet Union) Evgeniy Piunovski	50
10	(Soviet Union) Yuri Hlopotnov	48
