= FC Zimbru Chișinău in European football =

Zimbru in European football
- Club: Zimbru Chișinău
- First entry: 1993–94 Champions League
- Latest entry: 2026–27 Conference League

FC Zimbru is a Moldovan football club based in Botanica sector, Chișinău. They were the first Moldovan club to enter European competition, entering the UEFA Champions League in the season 1993–94. Since then, the club has competed in every UEFA-organised competition, with the exception of the now-defunct Intertoto Cup.
Zimbru played their first European match on 18 August 1993 against Beitar Jerusalem. The match took place at Republican Stadium in Chișinău, ended in a 1–1 draw, with Radu Rebeja scoring the equalizer in front of 13,000 spectators.
Midfielder Boris Cebotari holds the record for playing in the most European matches for Zimbru with 31 appearances while Victor Berco, Vadim Boreț and Sergiu Epureanu are the club's top scorers with five goals each. In total, Zimbru have appeared in 23 European competitions.

== Matches ==
Season	Competition	Round	Opponent	Home	Away	Agg.
1993–94	Champions League	Preliminary round	(Israel) Beitar Jerusalem	1–1	0–2	1–3
1994–95	UEFA Cup	Preliminary round	(Hungary) Kispest Honvéd	0–1	1–4	1–5
1995–96	UEFA Cup	Preliminary round	(Israel) Hapoel Tel Aviv	2–0	0–0	2–0
1995–96	UEFA Cup	First round	(Latvia) RAF Jelgava	1–0	2–1	3–1
1995–96	UEFA Cup	Second round	(Czech Republic) Sparta Prague	0–2	3–4	3–6
1996–97	UEFA Cup	Preliminary round	(Croatia) Hajduk Split	0–4	1–2	1–6
1997–98	Cup Winners' Cup	Qualifying round	(Ukraine) Shakhtar Donetsk	1–1	0–3	1–4
1998–99	Champions League	First qualifying round	(Hungary) Újpest	1–0	1–3	2–3
1999–00	Champions League	First qualifying round	(Republic of Ireland) St Patrick's Athletic	5–0	5–0	10–0
1999–00	Champions League	Second qualifying round	(Georgia (country)) Dinamo Tbilisi	2–0	1–2	3–2
1999–00	Champions League	Third qualifying round	(Netherlands) PSV Eindhoven	0–0	0–2	0–2
1999–00	UEFA Cup	First round	(England) Tottenham Hotspur	0–0	0–3	0–3
2000–01	Champions League	First qualifying round	(Albania) Tirana	3–2	3–2	6–4
2000–01	Champions League	Second qualifying round	(Slovenia) Maribor	2–0	0–1	2–1
2000–01	Champions League	Third qualifying round	(Czech Republic) Sparta Prague	0–1	0–1	0–2
2000–01	UEFA Cup	First round	(Germany) Hertha Berlin	1–2	0–2	1–4
2001–02	UEFA Cup	Qualifying round	(Turkey) Gaziantepspor	0–0	1–4	1–4
2002–03	UEFA Cup	Qualifying round	(Sweden) Göteborg	3–1	2–2	5–3
2002–03	UEFA Cup	First round	(Spain) Real Betis	0–2	1–2	1–4
2003–04	UEFA Cup	Qualifying round	(Bulgaria) Litex Lovech	2–0	0–0	2–0
2003–04	UEFA Cup	First round	(Greece) Aris	1–1	1–2	2–3
2006–07	UEFA Cup	First qualifying round	(Azerbaijan) Qarabağ	1–1	2–1 (a.e.t)	3–2
2006–07	UEFA Cup	Second qualifying round	(Ukraine) Metalurh Zaporizhya	0–0	0–3	0–3
2007–08	UEFA Cup	First qualifying round	(Slovakia) Artmedia Petržalka	2–2	1–1	3–3 (a)
2009–10	Europa League	First qualifying round	(Kazakhstan) Okzhetpes	1–2	2–0	3–2
2009–10	Europa League	Second qualifying round	(Portugal) Paços de Ferreira	0–0	0–1	0–1
2012–13	Europa League	First qualifying round	(Wales) Bangor City	2–1	0–0	2–1
2012–13	Europa League	Second qualifying round	(Switzerland) Young Boys	1–0 (a.e.t)	0–1	1–1 (1–4 p)
2014–15	Europa League	First qualifying round	(North Macedonia) Shkëndija	2–0	1–2	3–2
2014–15	Europa League	Second qualifying round	(Bulgaria) CSKA Sofia	0–0	1–1	1–1 (a)
2014–15	Europa League	Third qualifying round	(Austria) Grödig	0–1	2–1	2–2 (a)
2014–15	Europa League	Play-off round	(Greece) PAOK	1–0	0–4	1–4
2016–17	Europa League	First qualifying round	(Georgia (country)) Chikhura Sachkhere	0–1	3–2	3–3 (a)
2016–17	Europa League	Second qualifying round	(Turkey) Osmanlıspor	2–2	0–5	2–7
2023–24	Europa Conference League	First qualifying round	(San Marino) La Fiorita	1–0	1–1	2–1
2023–24	Europa Conference League	Second qualifying round	(Turkey) Fenerbahçe	0–4	0–5	0–9
2024–25	Conference League	Second qualifying round	Ararat-Armenia	0–3	1–3	1–6
2025–26	Conference League	Second qualifying round	(Kazakhstan) Astana	0–2	1–1	1–3
2026–27	Conference League	Second qualifying round	(Armenia) Noah	1–1	1–2	2–3

== Overall record ==
=== By competition ===
Competition	S	P	W	D	L	GF	GA	GD	Win %
UEFA Champions League	4	16	7	2	7	24	17	+7	43.75
UEFA Cup Winners' Cup	1	2	0	1	1	1	4	−3	0.00
UEFA Europa League / UEFA Cup	14	50	13	15	22	46	71	−25	26.00
UEFA Conference League	4	10	1	3	6	6	22	−16	10.00
Total	23	78	21	21	36	77	114	−37	26.92

=== By country ===
Opponents	Pld	W	D	L	GF	GA	GD	Win%
Albania	2	2	0	0	6	4	+2	100.00
Armenia	4	0	1	3	3	9	−6	0.00
Austria	2	1	0	1	2	2	+0	50.00
Azerbaijan	2	1	1	0	3	2	+1	50.00
Bulgaria	4	1	3	0	3	1	+2	25.00
Croatia	2	0	0	2	1	6	−5	0.00
Czechia	4	0	0	4	3	8	−5	0.00
England	2	0	1	1	0	3	−3	0.00
Georgia	4	2	0	2	6	5	+1	50.00
Germany	2	0	0	2	1	4	−3	0.00
Greece	4	1	1	2	3	7	−4	25.00
Hungary	4	1	0	3	3	8	−5	25.00
Ireland	2	2	0	0	10	0	+10	100.00
Israel	4	1	2	1	3	3	+0	25.00
Kazakhstan	4	1	1	2	4	5	−1	25.00
Latvia	2	2	0	0	3	1	+2	100.00
Macedonia	2	1	0	1	3	2	+1	50.00
Netherlands	2	0	1	1	0	2	−2	0.00
Portugal	2	0	1	1	0	1	−1	0.00
San Marino	2	1	1	0	2	1	+1	50.00
Slovakia	2	0	2	0	3	3	+0	0.00
Slovenia	2	1	0	1	2	1	+1	50.00
Spain	2	0	0	2	1	4	−3	0.00
Sweden	2	1	1	0	5	3	+2	50.00
Switzerland	2	1	0	1	1	1	+0	50.00
Turkey	6	0	2	4	3	20	−17	0.00
Ukraine	4	0	2	2	1	7	−6	0.00
Wales	2	1	1	0	2	1	+1	50.00

== Player statistics ==
Players in bold are still active at the club. Correct as of 30 July 2026.

=== Goal scorers ===
5 goals

- (Moldova) Victor Berco
- (Moldova) Vadim Boreț
- (Moldova) Sergiu Epureanu

4 goals

- (Moldova) Boris Cebotari

3 goals

- (Moldova) Vladislav Gavriliuc
- (Moldova) Ion Testemițanu
- (Moldova) Igor Oprea
- (Ukraine) Kostyantyn Kulyk
- (Romania) Daniel Bălașa

2 goals

- (Moldova) Radu Rebeja
- (Moldova) Boris Tropaneț
- (Moldova) Viorel Frunză
- (Georgia (country)) Levan Gvazava
- (Russia) Aleksei Zhdanov
- (Moldova) Oleg Molla
- (Moldova) Serghei Alexeev
- (Brazil) Emerson

1 goal

- (Moldova) Anatol Tîmbur
- (Moldova) Alexandru Suharev
- (Moldova) Iurie Miterev
- (Ukraine) Serhiy Zghura
- (Moldova) Serghei Dodul
- (Uzbekistan) Vladimir Shishelov
- (Armenia) Galust Petrosyan
- (Moldova) Sergiu Chirilov
- (Ukraine) Kyrylo Kovalchuk
- (Moldova) Ion Demerji
- (Moldova) Oleg Andronic
- (Moldova) Gheorghe Andronic
- (Russia) Akhmet Barakhoyev
- (Moldova) Alexandru Grosu
- (Ivory Coast) Jean-Marie Amani
- (Moldova) Alexandru Pașcenco
- (Moldova) Ștefan Burghiu
- (Moldova) Ion Jardan
- (Moldova) Veaceslav Zagaevschi
- (Moldova) Ilie Damașcan
- (Moldova) Marin Căruntu
- (Ukraine) Denys Dedechko
- (Nigeria) Justice Ohajunwa
- (Israel) Guy Dahan
- (Moldova) Ștefan Bîtca
- (Brazil) Jonathas

1 own goal

- (Germany) Simon Handle (in the match Grödig – Zimbru)

=== Most appearances ===
Rank	Player	Period	Apps
1	(Moldova) Boris Cebotari	1993–2006	31
2	(Moldova) Iurie Miterev	1993–2001	29
3	(Moldova) Vadim Boreț	1994–2000	27
4	(Moldova) Denis Romanenco	1994–2001	24
5	(Moldova) Igor Oprea	1996–2003	23
6	(Moldova) Valeriu Catînsus	1998–2001	20
6	(Moldova) Sergiu Epureanu	1998–2001	20
8	(Ukraine) Kostyantyn Kulyk	1998–2001	19
9	(Moldova) Victor Berco	1998–2001	18
10	(Moldova) Ion Testemițanu	1993–1998	16
10	(Moldova) Radu Rebeja	1993–1998	16
10	(Ukraine) Andriy Telesnenko	1998–2000	16
10	(Ukraine) Ruslan Hilazyev	1999–2000	16
10	(Moldova) Ștefan Burghiu	2014–2025	16

=== Clean sheets ===
Rank	Player	Clean sheets
1	(Moldova) Denis Romanenco	7
2	(Moldova) Vasile Coșelev	4
3	(Moldova) Nicolae Calancea	3
3	(Moldova) Denis Rusu	3
5	(Romania) Cătălin Mulțescu	2
5	(Moldova) Anatol Chirinciuc	2
7	(Moldova) Sebastian Agachi	1

== Record results ==
- Biggest home win: Zimbru – St Patrick's Athletic 5–0 (21 July 1999)
- Biggest home defeat: Zimbru – Hajduk Split 0–4 (17 July 1996), Zimbru – Fenerbahçe 0–4 (1 August 2023)
- Biggest away win: St Patrick's Athletic – Zimbru 0–5 (14 July 1999)
- Biggest away defeat: Osmanlıspor – Zimbru 5–0 (21 July 2016), Fenerbahçe – Zimbru 5–0 (26 July 2023)

== UEFA 5-year club ranking ==
As of 27 August 2026.

Rank	Club	Points gained in season					Total
Rank	Club	2022–23	2023–24	2024–25	2025–26	2026–27	Total
244	Zimbru Chișinău		1.500	1.500	1.500	1.500	6.000

Zimbru can still drop down in the ranking, as the 2026–27 club season is currently underway.

== See also ==
- Moldovan football clubs in European competitions
