= 1954 in Soviet football =

Football in the Soviet Union
- Season: 1954

Men's football
- Class A: Dinamo Moscow
- Class B: Shakhter Stalino
- Soviet Cup: Dinamo Kiev

The 1954 Soviet football championship was the 22nd seasons of competitive football in the Soviet Union and the 16th among teams of sports societies and factories. Dinamo Moscow won the championship becoming the Soviet domestic champions for the sixth time.

CDSA Moscow was reinstated and placed to the Class A.

== Honours ==
Competition	Winner	Runner-up
Class A	Dinamo Moscow (6*)	Spartak Moscow
Class B	Shakhter Stalino	Spartak Vilnius
Soviet Cup	Dinamo Kiev (1)	Spartak Yerevan

Notes = Number in parentheses is the times that club has won that honour. * indicates new record for competition

== Soviet Union football championship ==
=== Class A ===
Pos	Team	Pld	W	D	L	GF	GA	GD	Pts	Qualification
1	(Russian Soviet Federative Socialist Republic) Dynamo Moscow (C)	24	15	5	4	44	20	+24	35	League champions
2	(Russian Soviet Federative Socialist Republic) Spartak Moscow	24	14	3	7	49	26	+23	31	
3	(Byelorussian Soviet Socialist Republic) Spartak Minsk	24	12	6	6	29	23	+6	30	
4	(Russian Soviet Federative Socialist Republic) Trudovyye Rezervy Leningrad	24	8	10	6	29	25	+4	26	
5	(Ukrainian Soviet Socialist Republic) Dynamo Kiev	24	8	10	6	31	29	+2	26	
6	(Russian Soviet Federative Socialist Republic) CDSA Moscow	24	8	8	8	30	29	+1	24	
7	(Russian Soviet Federative Socialist Republic) Zenit Leningrad	24	8	7	9	27	26	+1	23	
8	(Georgian Soviet Socialist Republic) Dynamo Tbilisi	24	9	5	10	38	47	−9	23	
9	(Russian Soviet Federative Socialist Republic) Torpedo Moscow	24	8	6	10	34	34	0	22	
10	(Russian Soviet Federative Socialist Republic) Lokomotiv Moscow	24	7	7	10	21	23	−2	21	
11	(Russian Soviet Federative Socialist Republic) Krylia Sovetov Kuybyshev	24	7	6	11	20	28	−8	20	
12	(Ukrainian Soviet Socialist Republic) Lokomotiv Kharkov (R)	24	6	5	13	19	39	−20	17	Relegation to Class B
13	(Russian Soviet Federative Socialist Republic) Torpedo Gorkiy (R)	24	3	8	13	17	39	−22	14	Relegation to Class B

Source: rsssf.com
(C) Champions; (R) Relegated

=== Class B (final stage) ===
Pos	Rep	Team	Pld	W	D	L	GF	GA	GD	Pts	Promotion
1	UKR	Shakhtyor Stalino	5	4	1	0	10	1	+9	9	Promoted
2	LTU	Spartak Vilnius	5	2	3	0	4	2	+2	7	
3	AZE	Neftyanik Baku	5	2	1	2	7	7	0	5	
4	RUS	Zenit Kaliningrad (M.R.)	5	2	1	2	4	5	−1	5	
5	ARM	Spartak Yerevan	5	0	2	3	3	7	−4	2	
6	RUS	Torpedo Rostov-na-Donu	5	0	2	3	3	9	−6	2	

Source: rsssf.com
Notes:

Played in Stalino

=== Top goalscorers ===
Class A

- Anatoliy Ilyin (Spartak Moscow), Vladimir Ilyin (Dinamo Moscow), Antonin Sochnev (Trudovye Rezervy Leningrad) – 11 goals
