= 1952 in Soviet football =

Football in the Soviet Union
- Season: 1952

Men's football
- Class A: Spartak Moscow
- Class B: Lokomotiv Kharkov
- Soviet Cup: Torpedo Moscow

The 1952 Soviet football championship was the 20th seasons of competitive football in the Soviet Union and the 14th among teams of sports societies and factories. Spartak Moscow won the championship becoming the Soviet domestic champions for the fourth time and the first after World War II, the Spartak's main rivals Dinamo again had a difficult season struggling only for the second.

The defending champions CDSA were expelled from the league for the poor performance of the USSR national football team at the 1952 Summer Olympics in Helsinki. The Class A started late mid-summer consisting only of a single round-robin with almost all games played in Moscow.

== Honours ==
| Competition | Winner | Runner-up |
|---|---|---|
| Class A | Spartak Moscow (4) | Dinamo Kiev |
| Class B | Lokomotiv Kharkov | Spartak Vilnius |
| Soviet Cup | Torpedo Moscow (2) | Spartak Moscow |

Notes = Number in parentheses is the times that club has won that honour. * indicates new record for competition

== Soviet Union football championship ==
=== Class A ===
| Pos | Team | Pld | W | D | L | GF | GA | GD | Pts | Qualification |
|---|---|---|---|---|---|---|---|---|---|---|
| 1 | (Russian Soviet Federative Socialist Republic) Spartak Moscow (C) | 13 | 9 | 2 | 2 | 26 | 12 | +14 | 20 | League champions |
| 2 | (Ukrainian Soviet Socialist Republic) Dynamo Kiev | 13 | 7 | 3 | 3 | 26 | 14 | +12 | 17 | |
| 3 | (Russian Soviet Federative Socialist Republic) Dynamo Moscow | 13 | 7 | 3 | 3 | 24 | 14 | +10 | 17 | |
| 4 | (Georgian Soviet Socialist Republic) Dynamo Tbilisi | 13 | 5 | 6 | 2 | 19 | 12 | +7 | 16 | |
| 5 | (Russian Soviet Federative Socialist Republic) Dynamo Leningrad | 13 | 5 | 5 | 3 | 17 | 17 | 0 | 15 | |
| 6 | (Russian Soviet Federative Socialist Republic) Kalinin | 13 | 5 | 4 | 4 | 19 | 19 | 0 | 14 | |
| 7 | (Russian Soviet Federative Socialist Republic) Zenit Leningrad | 13 | 6 | 2 | 5 | 20 | 21 | −1 | 14 | |
| 8 | (Russian Soviet Federative Socialist Republic) Krylia Sovetov Kuybyshev | 13 | 5 | 3 | 5 | 16 | 14 | +2 | 13 | |
| 9 | (Russian Soviet Federative Socialist Republic) Lokomotiv Moscow | 13 | 5 | 2 | 6 | 19 | 21 | −2 | 12 | |
| 10 | (Russian Soviet Federative Socialist Republic) Torpedo Moscow | 13 | 3 | 6 | 4 | 11 | 15 | −4 | 12 | |
| 11 | (Russian Soviet Federative Socialist Republic) VVS Moscow (R) | 13 | 2 | 6 | 5 | 11 | 14 | −3 | 10 | Relegation to Class B |
| 12 | (Latvian Soviet Socialist Republic) Daugava Riga (R) | 13 | 2 | 5 | 6 | 10 | 14 | −4 | 9 | Relegation to Class B |
| 13 | (Ukrainian Soviet Socialist Republic) Shakhtyor Stalino (R) | 13 | 1 | 6 | 6 | 14 | 26 | −12 | 8 | Relegation to Class B |
| 14 | (Byelorussian Soviet Socialist Republic) Dinamo Minsk (R) | 13 | 1 | 3 | 9 | 10 | 29 | −19 | 5 | Relegation to Class B |

Source: rsssf.com
(C) Champions; (R) Relegated

=== Class B (second stage) ===
==== For places 1-9 ====
| Pos | Rep | Team | Pld | W | D | L | GF | GA | GD | Pts | Promotion |
|---|---|---|---|---|---|---|---|---|---|---|---|
| 1 | UKR | Lokomotiv Kharkov | 16 | 9 | 3 | 4 | 21 | 11 | +10 | 21 | Promoted |
| 2 | LTU | Spartak Vilnius | 16 | 6 | 7 | 3 | 23 | 20 | +3 | 19 | Promoted |
| 3 | GEO | DO Tbilisi | 16 | 6 | 5 | 5 | 24 | 15 | +9 | 17 | |
| 4 | RUS | Krasnoye Znamya Ivanovo | 16 | 8 | 1 | 7 | 24 | 25 | −1 | 17 | |
| 5 | RUS | VMS Leningrad (Note: VMS Moskva relocated to Leningrad.) | 16 | 6 | 4 | 6 | 19 | 15 | +4 | 16 | |
| 6 | RUS | Torpedo Gorkiy | 16 | 4 | 8 | 4 | 16 | 19 | −3 | 16 | |
| 7 | AZE | Neftyanik Baku | 16 | 5 | 5 | 6 | 20 | 21 | −1 | 15 | |
| 8 | MDA | Burevestnik Kishinev | 16 | 6 | 3 | 7 | 21 | 27 | −6 | 15 | |
| 9 | KAZ | Dinamo Alma-Ata | 16 | 1 | 6 | 9 | 13 | 28 | −15 | 8 | |

Source: rsssf.com

==== For places 10-18 ====
Played in Rostov-na-Donu

| Pos | Rep | Team | Pld | W | D | L | GF | GA | GD | Pts | Qualification |
|---|---|---|---|---|---|---|---|---|---|---|---|
| 10 | ARM | Dinamo Yerevan | 8 | 7 | 0 | 1 | 18 | 3 | +15 | 14 | |
| 11 | RUS | Torpedo Stalingrad | 8 | 5 | 1 | 2 | 16 | 7 | +9 | 11 | |
| 12 | RUS | DO Sverdlovsk | 8 | 4 | 1 | 3 | 14 | 8 | +6 | 9 | |
| 13 | RUS | Krasnaya Zvezda Petrozavodsk | 8 | 4 | 1 | 3 | 18 | 16 | +2 | 9 | |
| 14 | UKR | DO Kiev (O, R) | 8 | 4 | 0 | 4 | 13 | 9 | +4 | 8 | Relegation play-off |
| 15 | EST | Kalev Tallinn | 8 | 4 | 0 | 4 | 10 | 12 | −2 | 8 | |
| 16 | UZB | DO Tashkent | 8 | 3 | 1 | 4 | 10 | 17 | −7 | 7 | |
| 17 | TJK | Dinamo Stalinabad | 8 | 3 | 0 | 5 | 11 | 20 | −9 | 6 | |
| 18 | TKM | Spartak Ashkhabad | 8 | 0 | 0 | 8 | 2 | 20 | −18 | 0 | |

Source: rsssf.com
(O) Play-off winners; (R) Relegated

==== Relegation play-off ====
To the play-off qualified the champion of the 1952 Football Championship of the Ukrainian SSR and the worst Ukrainian team of masters of the 1952 Soviet Class B.

| Team 1 | Agg. | Team 2 | 1st leg | 2nd leg |
|---|---|---|---|---|
| ODO Kiev | 6–1 | Metallurg Zaporozhie | 3–0 | 3–1 |

=== Top goalscorers ===
Class A

- Andrei Zazroyev (Dinamo Kiev) – 11 goals
