= Berco =

Berco may refer to:

- Berco S.p.A., an Italian manufacturing company
- Berço SC, a Portuguese sports club
- Berco Lux, a Dutch toy manufacturing company
- Victor Berco (born 1979), Moldovan footballer
