= Montini =

Montini is an Italian surname. Notable individuals with the name Montini include:

- Giovanni Battista Montini, Archbishop of Milan, later known as Pope Paul VI
- Luigi Montini, Italian actor
- Mattia Montini, Italian footballer
- Pat Montini (1929–2008), South African rugby union player
- Walkiria Montini, Brazilian actress

Other uses include:

- Montini, a play by Richard Lalor Sheil
- Montini Altarpiece, a 16th-century painting by Cima da Conegliano
- Montini Catholic High School
- Montini (toy), a Dutch brand of building blocks
