= Ihor Nadein =

Ukrainian football manager (1948–2014)

Personal information
- Full name: Ihor Oleksandrovych Nadein
- Date of birth: 3 March 1948
- Place of birth: Tula, Soviet Union
- Date of death: 24 December 2014 (aged 66)
- Place of death: Zaporizhzhia, Ukraine
- Height: 1.80 m (5 ft 11 in)
- Positions: Midfielder; striker

Senior career*
Years	Team	Apps	(Gls)
1966–1967	Metallurg Tula	15	(3)
1968–1977	Nistru Kishinev	311	(80)
1978–1980	Kolos Nikopol	101	(20)
1980–1981	Dnipro Dnipropetrovsk	24	(2)

Managerial career
- 1983: FC Kolos Nikopol (assistant)
- 1984: FC Kolos Nikopol (director)
- 1987–1988: FC Dnipro Dnipropetrovsk (assistant)
- 1988–1992: FC Metalurh Zaporizhzhia
- 1993: FC Kryvbas Kryvyi Rih
- 1994–1997: FC Torpedo Zaporizhzhia
- 1998–1999: FC Constructorul Chisinev
- 2000–2002: FC Torpedo Zaporizhzhia
- 2002: FC Kryvbas Kryvyi Rih
- 2002–2004: FC Metalurh Zaporizhzhia (sportive director)
- 2002: FC Metalurh Zaporizhzhia
- 2002–2003: FC Metalurh-2 Zaporizhzhia
- 2004–2005: FC Helios Kharkiv
- 2007–2008: FC Helios Kharkiv
- * Club domestic league appearances and goals

Ihor Nadein (Ukrainian: Ігор Олександрович Надєїн; 3 March 1948 – 24 December 2014) was a Soviet football player and a Ukrainian coach and the Merited Coach of Ukraine.
