= Sergiu Sîrbu (footballer, born 1960) =

Moldovan footballer and manager

Personal information
- Date of birth: 15 September 1960 (age 66)
- Place of birth: Chișinău, Moldavian SSR, Soviet Union
- Position: Midfielder

Team information
- Current team: Zimbru Chișinău (assistant coach)

Senior career*
Years	Team	Apps	(Gls)
- Zimbru Chișinău

International career
1991	Moldova	1	(0)

Managerial career
- 1992–1993: Zimbru Chișinău
- 2003: Zimbru Chișinău
- 2006–2007: FC Iskra-Stal
- 2008–2009: FC Iskra-Stal (assistant coach)
- 2010: Rapid Ghidighici
- 2011: Rapid Ghidighici (assistant coach)
- 2011–2012: Zimbru Chișinău (assistant coach)
- 2012: Zimbru Chișinău (interim coach)
- * Club domestic league appearances and goals

Sergiu Sîrbu, sometimes written Sârbu (born 15 September 1960) is a Moldovan football manager and former player.

On 2 July 1991, he represented Moldova in its first international match, a loss 2–4 to Georgia. This was his only international match.

== Manager career ==
- 1992–1993 – Zimbru Chișinău
- 2003 – Zimbru Chișinău
- 2006–2007 – FC Iskra-Stal
- 2008–2009 – FC Iskra-Stal (assistant)
- 2010 – Rapid Ghidighici
- 2011 – Rapid Ghidighici (assistant)
- 2011–2012 – Zimbru Chișinău (assistant)
- 2012 – Zimbru Chișinău (interim coach)

== Honours ==
=== Manager ===
Zimbru Chișinău

- Moldovan National Division: 1992, 1992-1993, 1993-1994
