= 1954 Soviet Top League =

16th season of top-tier football league in Soviet Union

Soviet Top League
- Season: 1954

Thirteen teams took part in the 1954 Soviet national football league with FC Dynamo Moscow winning the title.

== League standings ==
Pos	Team	Pld	W	D	L	GF	GA	GD	Pts	Qualification
1	(Russian Soviet Federative Socialist Republic) Dynamo Moscow (C)	24	15	5	4	44	20	+24	35	League champions
2	(Russian Soviet Federative Socialist Republic) Spartak Moscow	24	14	3	7	49	26	+23	31	
3	(Byelorussian Soviet Socialist Republic) Spartak Minsk	24	12	6	6	29	23	+6	30	
4	(Russian Soviet Federative Socialist Republic) Trudovyye Rezervy Leningrad	24	8	10	6	29	25	+4	26	
5	(Ukrainian Soviet Socialist Republic) Dynamo Kiev	24	8	10	6	31	29	+2	26	
6	(Russian Soviet Federative Socialist Republic) CDSA Moscow	24	8	8	8	30	29	+1	24	
7	(Russian Soviet Federative Socialist Republic) Zenit Leningrad	24	8	7	9	27	26	+1	23	
8	(Georgian Soviet Socialist Republic) Dynamo Tbilisi	24	9	5	10	38	47	−9	23	
9	(Russian Soviet Federative Socialist Republic) Torpedo Moscow	24	8	6	10	34	34	0	22	
10	(Russian Soviet Federative Socialist Republic) Lokomotiv Moscow	24	7	7	10	21	23	−2	21	
11	(Russian Soviet Federative Socialist Republic) Krylia Sovetov Kuybyshev	24	7	6	11	20	28	−8	20	
12	(Ukrainian Soviet Socialist Republic) Lokomotiv Kharkov (R)	24	6	5	13	19	39	−20	17	Relegation to Class B
13	(Russian Soviet Federative Socialist Republic) Torpedo Gorkiy (R)	24	3	8	13	17	39	−22	14	Relegation to Class B

Source: rsssf.com
(C) Champions; (R) Relegated

== Results ==
Home \ Away	CDS	DYK	DYN	DTB	KRY	LKH	LOK	SMN	SPA	TGR	TOR	TRL	ZEN
CDSA Moscow		1–1	0–0	6–1	1–1	2–0	2–0	3–0	2–1	1–1	1–0	0–2	0–4
Dynamo Kiev	1–0		1–1	1–1	1–1	1–1	0–0	1–0	2–4	1–3	2–0	3–2	5–2
Dynamo Moscow	5–1	3–4		2–0	1–0	3–1	0–0	2–1	1–0	2–0	3–2	1–0	1–1
Dynamo Tbilisi	1–1	0–0	1–2		2–0	7–1	4–2	2–2	2–1	2–1	2–1	2–3	0–2
Krylia Sovetov Kuybyshev	1–1	1–0	1–3	1–3		0–1	0–1	1–0	1–3	0–0	1–3	0–0	3–0
Lokomotiv Kharkov	3–1	1–0	0–0	1–0	1–3		0–0	0–1	0–3	0–1	1–4	1–1	1–2
Lokomotiv Moscow	0–0	0–1	1–0	6–1	0–1	2–0		0–0	0–2	1–0	0–1	2–0	0–0
Spartak Minsk	1–0	2–1	1–0	3–2	2–0	1–0	3–2		2–3	0–0	3–2	1–1	1–0
Spartak Moscow	0–1	1–1	0–2	5–0	3–1	3–1	5–2	1–2		1–1	2–0	1–2	2–1
Torpedo Gorkiy	2–1	0–0	2–6	0–1	0–1	0–2	1–2	0–0	1–4		0–5	1–2	0–2
Torpedo Moscow	2–1	0–2	0–2	2–2	1–1	0–0	1–0	2–1	1–3	3–1		2–2	2–2
Trudovyye Rezervy Leningrad	1–3	2–2	3–2	1–2	1–0	4–0	1–0	0–0	0–0	1–1	0–0		0–0
Zenit Leningrad	1–1	3–0	0–2	3–0	0–1	0–3	0–0	0–2	0–1	1–1	2–0	1–0	

Legend: Blue = home team win; Yellow = draw; Red = away team win.

== Top scorers ==
11 goals

- Anatoli Ilyin (Spartak Moscow)
- Vladimir Ilyin (Dynamo Moscow)
- Antonin Sochnev (Trudovyye Rezervy Leningrad)

10 goals

- Avtandil Gogoberidze (Dinamo Tbilisi)
- Mykhaylo Koman (Dynamo Kiev)

9 goals

- Vitali Vatskevich (Torpedo Moscow)

8 goals

- Gennadi Bondarenko (Dynamo Moscow)
- Nikolai Yefimov (Torpedo Gorky)
- Viktor Voroshilov (Krylia Sovetov Kuybyshev)

7 goals

- Nikolai Dementyev (Spartak Moscow)
- Valentin Ivanov (Torpedo Moscow)
- Aleksandr Kotrikadze (Dinamo Tbilisi)
- Boris Tatushin (Spartak Moscow)
- Anatoli Yegorov (Spartak Moscow)
