= Nikolai Vasilyev (footballer) =

Russian footballer and coach

Personal information
- Full name: Nikolai Viktorovich Vasilyev
- Date of birth: April 10, 1957 (age 69)
- Place of birth: Voronezh, Russian SFSR
- Height: 1.79 m (5 ft 10 1/2 in)
- Positions: Midfielder; forward

Team information
- Current team: Prialit Reutov

Senior career*
Years	Team	Apps	(Gls)
1974	FC Trud Voronezh	1	(0)
1975–1985	FC Torpedo Moscow	183	(45)
1986	FC Fakel Voronezh	40	(2)
1987–1989	FC Nistru Chişinău	101	(50)
1990–1992	FC Tiligul Tiraspol	107	(27)
1993–1994	FC Lada Dimitrovgrad	60	(15)
1995	Constructorul Chişinău	9	(0)
Total		501	(139)

Managerial career
- 2002: FC Torpedo-ZIL Moscow (reserves)
- 2003: FC Torpedo-Metallurg Moscow (reserves assistant)
- 2003: FC Torpedo-Metallurg Moscow (reserves)
- 2004: FC Moscow (reserves)
- 2010: FC Moscow
- 2010–2011: Prialit Reutov
- * Club domestic league appearances and goals

Nikolai Viktorovich Vasilyev (Russian: Николай Викторович Васильев; born April 10, 1957, in Voronezh) is a Russian professional football coach and a former player.

== Honours ==
- Soviet Cup finalist: 1982.
