= 1952 Soviet Class B =

Soviet Union football championship

Soviet Class B
- Season: 1952

The 1952 Soviet Class B football championship.

FC Lokomotiv Kharkov winning the championship.

== Teams ==
=== Relegated teams ===
Two teams were relegated from the 1951 Soviet Class A (top tier).

- VMS Moscow (return after a year absence)
- FC Torpedo Gorkiy (return after a year absence)

=== Promoted teams ===
Two teams received direct promotion. One team were promoted from republican competitions through last year post-season playoffs.

- DO Tbilisi – Winner of the 1951 Football Championship of the Georgian SSR (return after a two-year absence)
- DO Sverdlovsk – Winner of the 1951 Football Championship of the Russian SFSR (return after a two-year absence)
- DO Kiev – Winner of the 1951 Football Championship of the Ukrainian SSR and promotion play-off (return after a two-year absence)

== First stage ==
=== Group Kharkov ===
Pos	Rep	Team	Pld	W	D	L	GF	GA	GD	Pts
1	LTU	Spartak Vilnius	5	3	2	0	6	1	+5	8
2	UKR	Lokomotiv Kharkov	5	2	3	0	5	1	+4	7
3	RUS	VMS Moskva	5	2	2	1	10	4	+6	6
4	UZB	DO Tashkent	5	2	0	3	8	11	−3	4
5	KAR	Krasnaya Zvezda Petrozavodsk	5	0	3	2	6	10	−4	3
6	TKM	Spartak Ashkhabad	5	0	2	3	4	12	−8	2

Source: rsssf.com

=== Group Ivanovo ===
Pos	Rep	Team	Pld	W	D	L	GF	GA	GD	Pts
1	GEO	DO Tbilisi	5	3	2	0	9	3	+6	8
2	RUS	Krasnoye Znamya Ivanovo	5	2	3	0	9	5	+4	7
3	KAZ	Dinamo Alma-Ata	5	2	2	1	4	3	+1	6
4	EST	Kalev Tallinn	5	2	2	1	3	4	−1	6
5	ARM	Dinamo Yerevan	5	1	0	4	5	11	−6	2
6	RUS	Torpedo Stalingrad	5	0	1	4	7	11	−4	1

Source: rsssf.com

=== Group Baku ===
Pos	Rep	Team	Pld	W	D	L	GF	GA	GD	Pts
1	AZE	Neftyanik Baku	4	3	0	1	6	3	+3	6
2	MDA	Burevestnik Kishinev	4	1	2	1	4	4	0	4
3	RUS	Torpedo Gorkiy	4	1	2	1	5	5	0	4
4	RUS	DO Sverdlovsk	4	1	1	2	4	5	−1	3
5	UKR	DO Kiev	4	0	3	1	2	4	−2	3

Source: rsssf.com

== Second stage ==
=== For places 1-9 ===
Pos	Rep	Team	Pld	W	D	L	GF	GA	GD	Pts	Promotion
1	UKR	Lokomotiv Kharkov	16	9	3	4	21	11	+10	21	Promoted
2	LTU	Spartak Vilnius	16	6	7	3	23	20	+3	19	Promoted
3	GEO	DO Tbilisi	16	6	5	5	24	15	+9	17	
4	RUS	Krasnoye Znamya Ivanovo	16	8	1	7	24	25	−1	17	
5	RUS	VMS Leningrad (Note: VMS Moskva relocated to Leningrad.)	16	6	4	6	19	15	+4	16	
6	RUS	Torpedo Gorkiy	16	4	8	4	16	19	−3	16	
7	AZE	Neftyanik Baku	16	5	5	6	20	21	−1	15	
8	MDA	Burevestnik Kishinev	16	6	3	7	21	27	−6	15	
9	KAZ	Dinamo Alma-Ata	16	1	6	9	13	28	−15	8	

Source: rsssf.com

=== For places 10-18 ===
Played in Rostov-na-Donu

Pos	Rep	Team	Pld	W	D	L	GF	GA	GD	Pts	Qualification
10	ARM	Dinamo Yerevan	8	7	0	1	18	3	+15	14	
11	RUS	Torpedo Stalingrad	8	5	1	2	16	7	+9	11	
12	RUS	DO Sverdlovsk	8	4	1	3	14	8	+6	9	Relegation
13	RUS	Krasnaya Zvezda Petrozavodsk	8	4	1	3	18	16	+2	9	
14	UKR	DO Kiev (O, R)	8	4	0	4	13	9	+4	8	Relegation play-off
15	EST	Kalev Tallinn	8	4	0	4	10	12	−2	8	Relegation
16	UZB	DO Tashkent	8	3	1	4	10	17	−7	7	Relegation
17	TJK	Dinamo Stalinabad	8	3	0	5	11	20	−9	6	
18	TKM	Spartak Ashkhabad	8	0	0	8	2	20	−18	0	

Source: rsssf.com
(O) Play-off winners; (R) Relegated

== Relegation play-off ==
To the play-off qualified the champion of the 1952 Football Championship of the Ukrainian SSR and the worst Ukrainian team of masters of the 1952 Soviet Class B.

Team 1	Agg.	Team 2	1st leg	2nd leg
ODO Kiev	6–1	Metallurg Zaporozhie	3–0	3–1

== Number of teams by republics ==
Number	Union republics	Team(s)
5	Russian SFSR	VMS Moscow FC Krasnoye Znamya Ivanovo, FC Torpedo Stalingrad, FC Torpedo Gorkiy, DO Sverdlovsk
2	Ukrainian SSR	FC Lokomotiv Kharkov, DO Kiev
1	Lithuanian SSR	FC Spartak Vilnius
1	Uzbek SSR	DO Tashkent
1	Karelo-Finnish SSR	FC Krasnaya Zvezda Petrozavodsk
1	Turkmen SSR	FC Spartak Asgabat
1	Georgian SSR	DO Tbilisi
1	Kazakh SSR	FC Dinamo Alma-Ata
1	Estonian SSR	FC Kalev Tallinn
1	Armenian SSR	FC Dinamo Yerevan
1	Azerbaijan SSR	FC Neftianik Baku
1	Moldavian SSR	FC Burevestnik Kishinev
1	Tajik SSR	FC Dinamo Stalinobad

== See also ==
- 1952 Soviet Class A
- 1952 Soviet Cup
