= 1965 Soviet Class A Second Group =

Soviet Class A Second Group
- Season: 1965

The 1965 Soviet Class A Second Group was the third season of the Soviet Class A Second Group football competitions that was established in 1963. It was also the 25th season of the Soviet second-tier league competition.

== First stage ==
=== First Subgroup ===
Pos	Rep	Team	Pld	W	D	L	GF	GA	GD	Pts
1	RUS	Textilshchik Ivanovo	30	15	9	6	37	25	+12	39
2	RUS	UralMash Sverdlovsk	30	12	12	6	30	19	+11	36
3	UKR	Avangard Kharkov	30	14	8	8	37	27	+10	36
4	KAZ	Shakhtyor Karaganda	30	11	11	8	27	25	+2	33
5	MDA	Moldova Kishinev	30	12	8	10	20	18	+2	32
6	RUS	Volga Gorkiy	30	11	10	9	30	29	+1	32
7	RUS	Terek Grozny	30	11	9	10	39	36	+3	31
8	RUS	Lokomotiv Chelyabinsk	30	11	8	11	36	37	−1	30
9	UKR	Lokomotiv Vinnitsa	30	8	13	9	25	23	+2	29
10	RUS	Trud Voronezh	30	8	13	9	23	21	+2	29
11	RUS	Traktor Volgograd	30	8	12	10	24	28	−4	28
12	BLR	Spartak Gomel (Note: Spartak Gomel was called Lokomotiv.)	30	7	13	10	22	30	−8	27
13	TJK	Energetik Dushanbe	30	7	11	12	28	32	−4	25
14	UKR	Metallurg Zaporozhye	30	8	9	13	28	37	−9	25
15	GEO	Lokomotiv Tbilisi	30	8	8	14	39	44	−5	24
16	TKM	Stroitel Ashkhabad	30	8	8	14	29	43	−14	24

=== Second Subgroup ===
Pos	Rep	Team	Pld	W	D	L	GF	GA	GD	Pts
1	RUS	Shinnik Yaroslavl	30	18	6	6	44	19	+25	42
2	UKR	Zarya Lugansk	30	14	12	4	36	23	+13	40
3	LTU	Žalgiris Vilnius	30	15	6	9	47	31	+16	36
4	KAZ	Kayrat Alma-Ata	30	14	8	8	32	18	+14	36
5	UKR	Dnepr Dnepropetrovsk	30	13	10	7	31	23	+8	36
6	ARM	Ararat Yerevan	30	14	7	9	35	32	+3	35
7	UKR	Karpaty Lvov	30	11	11	8	36	22	+14	33
8	LVA	Daugava Riga	30	11	9	10	37	38	−1	31
9	RUS	Dinamo Leningrad	30	11	7	12	44	38	+6	29
10	RUS	SKA Novosibirsk	30	11	7	12	33	34	−1	29
11	KGZ	Alga Frunze	30	10	8	12	25	30	−5	28
12	RUS	Kuban Krasnodar	30	8	10	12	22	28	−6	26
13	UZB	Politotdel Tashkent Region	30	7	11	12	18	30	−12	25
14	RUS	Volga Kalinin	30	7	8	15	19	34	−15	22
15	RUS	RostSelMash Rostov-na-Donu	30	6	5	19	20	52	−32	17
16	EST	Dinamo Tallinn	30	3	9	18	20	47	−27	15

== Final stage ==
=== For places 1-16 ===
Pos	Rep	Team	Pld	W	D	L	GF	GA	GD	Pts	Promotion
1	ARM	Ararat Yerevan	30	16	6	8	46	34	+12	38	Promoted
2	KAZ	Kayrat Alma-Ata	30	13	12	5	37	17	+20	38	Promoted
3	UKR	Avangard Kharkov	30	15	6	9	36	34	+2	36	
4	RUS	Textilshchik Ivanovo	30	13	9	8	40	27	+13	35	
5	RUS	Shinnik Yaroslavl	30	14	7	9	36	23	+13	35	
6	RUS	UralMash Sverdlovsk	30	13	9	8	39	28	+11	35	
7	UKR	Zarya Lugansk	30	12	9	9	33	29	+4	33	
8	UKR	Dnepr Dnepropetrovsk	30	11	9	10	28	27	+1	31	
9	UKR	Karpaty Lvov	30	10	10	10	29	25	+4	30	
10	LTU	Žalgiris Vilnius	30	10	8	12	33	33	0	28	
11	RUS	Volga Gorkiy	30	12	4	14	28	39	−11	28	
12	KAZ	Shakhtyor Karaganda	30	9	9	12	25	26	−1	27	
13	RUS	Terek Grozny	30	10	5	15	33	45	−12	25	
14	MDA	Moldova Kishinev	30	7	9	14	16	29	−13	23	
15	LVA	Daugava Riga	30	6	8	16	26	47	−21	20	
16	RUS	Lokomotiv Chelyabinsk	30	4	10	16	21	43	−22	18	

==== Match for 1st place ====
[Nov 25, Grozny]

- Ararat Yerevan 2-1 Kayrat Alma-Ata

=== For places 17-32 ===
Pos	Rep	Team	Pld	W	D	L	GF	GA	GD	Pts
17	KGZ	Alga Frunze	46	19	13	14	49	39	+10	51
18	RUS	Traktor Volgograd	46	14	19	13	45	44	+1	47
19	RUS	SKA Novosibirsk	46	16	15	15	51	53	−2	47
20	RUS	Dinamo Leningrad	46	16	14	16	69	60	+9	46
21	UKR	Lokomotiv Vinnitsa	46	13	20	13	41	37	+4	46
22	RUS	Trud Voronezh	46	12	22	12	41	38	+3	46
23	UZB	Politotdel Tashkent Region	46	15	16	15	35	37	−2	46
24	BLR	Spartak Gomel	46	14	17	15	35	42	−7	45
25	RUS	Kuban Krasnodar	46	14	15	17	38	41	−3	43
26	GEO	Lokomotiv Tbilisi	46	14	12	20	60	63	−3	40
27	TKM	Stroitel Ashkhabad	46	14	11	21	52	64	−12	39
28	UKR	Metallurg Zaporozhye	46	11	15	20	44	60	−16	37
29	TJK	Energetik Dushanbe	46	10	15	21	39	55	−16	35
30	RUS	Volga Kalinin	46	12	11	23	33	57	−24	35
31	EST	Dinamo Tallinn	46	6	16	24	34	69	−35	28
32	RUS	RostSelMash Rostov-na-Donu	46	9	9	28	37	76	−39	27

Source: rsssf.com

== Top scorers ==
25 goals

- Vladimir Korotkov (Shinnik Yaroslavl)

23 goals

- Valeriy Pogorelov (Traktor Volgograd)

21 goals

- German Apukhtin (SKA Novosibirsk)

18 goals

- Seiran Galstyan (Ararat Yerevan)

17 goals

- Givi Mumladze (Lokomotivi Tbilisi)
- Valentin Kosov (Terek Grozny)

== Number of teams by republics ==
Number	Union republics	Team(s)
13	Russian SFSR	FC Tekstilschik Ivanovo, FC Shinnik Yaroslavl, FC UralMash Sverdlovsk, FC Volga Gorkiy, FC Terek Grozny, FC Lokomotiv Chelyabinsk, FC Traktor Volgograd, SKA Novosibirsk, FC Dinamo Leningrad, FC Trud Voronezh, FC Kuban Krasnodar, FC Volga Kalinin, FC Rostselmash Rostov-na-Donu
6	Ukrainian SSR	FC Avangard Kharkov, FC Zaria Lugansk, FC Dnepr Dnepropetrovsk, FC Karpaty Lvov, FC Lokomotiv Vinnitsa, FC Metallurg Zaporozhye
2	Kazakh SSR	FC Kairat Alma-Ata, FC Shakhter Karaganda
1	Armenian SSR	FC Ararat Yerevan
1	Lithuanian SSR	FK Žalgiris Vilnius
1	Moldavian SSR	FC Moldova Kishinev
1	Latvian SSR	FC Daugava Riga
1	Kyrgyz SSR	FC Alga Frunze
1	Uzbek SSR	FC Politotdel Tashkent Oblast
1	Belarusian SSR	FC Spartak Gomel
1	Georgian SSR	FC Lokomotivi Tbilisi
1	Turkmen SSR	FC Stroitel Ashkhabat
1	Tajik SSR	FC Energetik Dushanbe
1	Estonian SSR	FC Dinamo Tallinn

== See also ==
- Soviet First League
