= Denis Romanenco =

Moldovan footballer

Personal information
- Date of birth: 18 November 1974 (age 51)
- Place of birth: Chișinău, Moldavian SSR, Soviet Union
- Height: 1.85 m (6 ft 1 in)
- Position: Goalkeeper

Senior career*
Years	Team	Apps	(Gls)
1992–2003	Zimbru Chişinău	202	(0)
2004–2006	Dynamo Makhachkala	71	(0)
2007	Mashuk Pyatigorsk	6	(0)
2008	Energetik	13	(0)
2008–2009	Dacia Chişinău	3	(0)
2009–2010	Rapid Chișinău	11	(0)
2010	Dinamo Samarqand	22	(0)
2011–2012	Navbahor Namangan	41	(0)
Total		369	(0)

International career^{‡}
1996–2006	Moldova	25	(0)

Managerial career
- 2014: Veris Chișinău (GK coach)
- 2015–2017: Zimbru Chişinău (GK coach)
- 2017–2019: Politehnica Iași (GK coach)
- 2019: Universitatea Cluj (GK coach)
- 2021–2025: Moldova (GK coach)
- 2020–2026: Petrocub Hîncești (GK coach)
- * Club domestic league appearances and goals as of 13 July 2024 ‡ National team caps and goals as of 13 July 2024

Denis Romanenco (born 18 November 1974) is a former Moldovan professional footballer. He played as a goalkeeper.

== Club career ==
He holds the Moldavian domestic record for going 1154 minutes without conceding a goal, in the 1998–99 title winning season. He won the Moldovan National Division seven times and Moldovan Cup twice with Zimbru Chişinău.

== International career ==
Before becoming second choice goalkeeper for the UEFA Euro 2004 qualifying, Romanenco played 6 games for the 2002 FIFA World Cup qualification.

== Personal life ==
Denis Romanenco was one of the 11 Moldovian football players challenged and beaten by Tony Hawkes and features in his book Playing the Moldovans at Tennis.
