= Walkiria Montini =

Brazilian vedette and actress (died 2008)

Walkiria Montini (died April 2008) was a Brazilian vedette and film and theater actress who developed her career in Spain.

She was known for her role in the trans scene of the 1980s in Spain and for starring in 1989 in the first legal marriage of a trans woman with another woman in the country.

== Life and career ==
Walkiria was born and raised in Brazil, and in the 1980s she moved to Spain, where she began performing in nightclubs, specializing in lip-sync performances of songs by singers like Dalida and Vikki Carr. She also became known within the transgender community for performing clandestine silicone injections.

In 1984, she appeared in the play Locas de amor at the Teatro Muñoz Seca, and that same year she was part of the cast of Escándalo Gay, staged at the Teatro Progreso. Two years later, she became the first vedette to perform at Sala Minotauro in Madrid with her show “Lo Prohibido.” During this same time, she played minor roles in two films: La tercera luna (1984) and Los presuntos (1986).

Two weeks before 1989, she became national news after it was revealed that she was wanted by authorities and required to return to Brazil under the Foreigners Law. At the time, she was hiding in Gijón.

On December 15, 1989, she married cabaret artist and work colleague Mercedes Estrada, becoming the first trans woman in Spain to marry another woman. Several days after their wedding, both posed semi-nude for the magazine Interviú.

Throughout her career, she frequently performed alongside Argentine artist Vanessa Nell. Walkiria Montini died in April 2008 at the age of 52.

== Filmography ==
Year	Title	Role	Director
1984	La tercera luna		Gregorio Almendros
1986	Los presuntos		Mariano Ozores

== Theatre ==
- Locas de amor (1984)
- Escándalo Gay (1984)
