= Sergey Tsyganov =

Russian footballer

Personal information
- Full name: Sergey Nikolaevych Tsyganov
- Date of birth: 4 January 1992 (age 34)
- Place of birth: Saint Petersburg, Russia
- Height: 1.83 m (6 ft 0 in)
- Position: Forward

Youth career
- –2011: FC Zenit Saint Petersburg

Senior career*
Years	Team	Apps	(Gls)
2011–2013	FC Zenit Saint Petersburg	0	(0)
2013–2014	FC Zimbru Chișinău	39	(17)
2014–2015	FC Yenisey Krasnoyarsk	5	(0)
2015	→ FC Dynamo Barnaul (loan)	8	(1)
2015–2016	FC Syzran-2003	21	(6)
2016–2017	FC Olimpiyets Nizhny Novgorod	17	(1)
2017–2018	FC Zorky Krasnogorsk	22	(8)
2018–2019	FC Syzran-2003	18	(4)
2019–2020	FC Volga Ulyanovsk	13	(1)
2020	FC Mashuk-KMV Pyatigorsk	12	(1)

International career
2011	Russia U19	3	(0)
- * Club domestic league appearances and goals

Sergey Nikolayevich Tsyganov (Russian: Сергей Николаевич Цыганов; born 4 January 1992) is a Russian former football forward.

== Club career ==
He made his Russian Football National League debut for FC Yenisey Krasnoyarsk on 27 July 2014 in a game against FC Tyumen.

== Honours ==
Zimbru Chișinău

- Moldovan Cup : 2013–14
