= Hugo Neto =

Portuguese footballer

Personal information
- Full name: Hugo Daniel Santos Neto
- Date of birth: 7 March 1997 (age 29)
- Place of birth: Braga, Portugal
- Height: 1.80 m (5 ft 11 in)
- Position: Forward

Youth career
- 2006–2014: Braga
- 2014–2016: Benfica
- 2016: → Tondela (loan)

Senior career*
Years	Team	Apps	(Gls)
2016–2017	Zimbru Chișinău	35	(6)
2019–2020	Caldas	36	(16)
2020–2021	Maria da Fonte	14	(2)
2021	Louletano	8	(1)
2021–2022	Gondomar	10	(1)
2022–2023	Merelinense	16	(3)

International career
2013–2014	Portugal U17	6	(3)
- * Club domestic league appearances and goals as of 20:19, 11 April 2023 (UTC)

Hugo Daniel Santos Neto (born 7 March 1997) is a Portuguese professional footballer who plays as a forward. Besides Portugal, he has played in Moldova.
