= Iurie Miterev =

Moldovan footballer

Personal information
- Full name: Iurie Miterev
- Date of birth: 28 February 1975
- Place of birth: Chișinău, Moldavian SSR, Soviet Union
- Date of death: 27 June 2012 (aged 37)
- Place of death: Chișinău, Moldova
- Height: 1.81 m (5 ft 11 in)
- Position: Forward

Senior career*
Years	Team	Apps	(Gls)
1992–2002	Zimbru Chişinău	250	(129)
2002–2006	Chornomorets Odesa	83	(14)
2003	→ Chornomorets-2 Odesa	1	(0)
2006	Zorya Luhansk	5	(0)
2006	Dacia Chișinău	1	(0)
2007	Mashuk Pyatigorsk	2	(0)
Total		342	(143)

International career
1992–2006	Moldova	36	(8)
- * Club domestic league appearances and goals

Iurie Miterev (28 February 1975 – 27 June 2012) was a Moldovan footballer.

== Club career ==
Miterev came to fame when he became runner-up in the top goalscoring chart of the Moldovan league in 1996–97 with 34 goals, only one behind Serghei Rogaciov. The next season, he came second again, this time behind Serghei Cleşcenco.

He was signed by Chornomorets Odesa in the summer of 2002.

== International career ==
Miterev won 36 caps for the Moldova national football team. He played five games in 2006 FIFA World Cup qualification (UEFA).

== Career statistics ==
=== International goals ===
#	Date	Venue	Opponent	Score	Result	Competition
1.	28 August 1992	International Stadium, Amman, Jordan	Congo	1–3	Won	Jordan Tournament
2.	28 August 1992	International Stadium, Amman, Jordan	Congo	1–3	Won	Jordan Tournament
3.	28 August 1992	International Stadium, Amman, Jordan	Congo	1–3	Won	Jordan Tournament
4.	15 November 1995	Stadionul Republican, Chişinău, Moldova	Georgia	3–2	Won	Euro 1996 qual.
5.	15 November 1995	Stadionul Republican, Chişinău, Moldova	Georgia	3–2	Won	Euro 1996 qual.
6.	30 October 1996	Stadio La Sciorba, Genoa, Italy	Indonesia	1–2	Won	Friendly
7.	30 October 1996	Stadio La Sciorba, Genoa, Italy	Indonesia	1–2	Won	Friendly
8.	18 August 2004	Sheriff Stadium, Tiraspol, Moldova	Georgia	1–0	Won	Friendly
Correct as of 7 October 2015

== Other Fact ==
Iurie Miterev was one of the 11 Moldovan football players challenged and beaten by Tony Hawks and features in his book Playing the Moldovans at Tennis.

== Death ==
On 27 June 2012, Iurie Miterev died of leukemia.
