= 1955 Soviet Class B =

Soviet Class B
- Season: 1955

Following are the results of the 1955 Soviet First League football championship. FC Burevestnik Kishinev and FC ODO Sverdlovsk winning the championship.

== Teams ==
=== Relegated teams ===
Two teams were relegated from the 1954 Soviet Class A (top tier).

- Lokomotiv Kharkov – (return after a two-year absence)
- Torpedo Gorkiy – (return after a year absence)

=== Promoted teams ===
- Krylia Sovetov Stupino – debut, Champion of the 1954 Football Championship of the Russian SFSR
- Dinamo Tallinn – debut, Champion of the 1954 Football Championship of the Estonian SSR and promotion/relegation play-off

=== Replaced and renamed teams ===
- Metallurg Odessa was replaced with Pischevik Odessa, while Metallurg restarted at republican level.
- Stupino → Krylia Sovetov Stupino
- Shakhter Mosbass → Shakhter Stalinogorsk
- Lokomotiv Alma-Ata → Urozhai Alma-Ata

== Final standings ==
=== Zone I ===
Pos	Rep	Team	Pld	W	D	L	GF	GA	GD	Pts	Promotion
1	MDA	Burevestnik Kishinev	30	20	6	4	86	46	+40	46	Promoted
2	RUS	Spartak Kalinin	30	16	5	9	48	31	+17	37	
3	UKR	ODO Kiev	30	14	8	8	44	27	+17	36	
4	LTU	Spartak Vilnius	30	13	10	7	40	29	+11	36	
5	RUS	Krasnoye Znamya Ivanovo	30	13	10	7	43	33	+10	36	
6	RUS	Krylya Sovetov Stupino	30	13	6	11	48	35	+13	32	
7	UKR	ODO Lvov	30	13	6	11	47	40	+7	32	
8	UKR	Metallurg Zaporozhye	30	13	6	11	37	33	+4	32	
9	UKR	Lokomotiv Kharkov	30	12	6	12	48	34	+14	30	
10	UKR	Metallurg Dnepropetrovsk	30	14	2	14	53	47	+6	30	
11	RUS	Shakhtyor Stalinogorsk (Note: Shakhtyor Mosbass relocated to Stalinogorsk.)	30	10	9	11	34	38	−4	29	
12	UKR	Pishchevik Odessa (Note: Pishchevik Odessa was called Metallurg.)	30	11	5	14	39	47	−8	27	
13	UKR	Spartak Uzhgorod	30	8	9	13	33	40	−7	25	
14	LVA	Daugava Riga	30	6	10	14	29	57	−28	22	
15	UKR	DOF Sevastopol	30	7	6	17	25	61	−36	20	
16	EST	Dinamo Tallinn	30	2	6	22	22	78	−56	10	

Source: rsssf.com

=== Number of teams by republics ===
Number	Union republics	Team(s)
8	Ukrainian SSR	ODO Kiev, ODO Lvov, FC Metallurg Zaporozhye, FC Lokomotiv Kharkov, FC Metallurg Dnepropetrovsk, FC Pischevik Odessa, FC Spartak Uzhgorod, DOF Sevastopol
4	Russian SFSR	FC Spartak Kalinin, FC Krasnoye Znamya Ivanovo, FC Krylya Sovetov Stupino, FC Shakhter Stalinogorsk
1	Moldavian SSR	FC Burevestnik Kishinev
1	Lithuanian SSR	FC Spartak Vilnius
1	Latvian SSR	FC Daugava Riga
1	Estonian SSR	FC Dinamo Tallinn

=== Zone II ===
Pos	Rep	Team	Pld	W	D	L	GF	GA	GD	Pts	Promotion
1	RUS	ODO Sverdlovsk	30	20	5	5	56	23	+33	45	Promoted
2	ARM	Spartak Yerevan	30	18	6	6	44	17	+27	42	
3	GEO	ODO Tbilisi	30	18	5	7	61	32	+29	41	
4	RUS	Torpedo Gorkiy	30	17	6	7	53	28	+25	40	
5	RUS	Neftyanik Krasnodar	30	17	4	9	60	39	+21	38	
6	AZE	Neftyanik Baku	30	12	9	9	48	44	+4	33	
7	RUS	Krylya Sovetov Voronezh	30	12	9	9	37	37	0	33	
8	RUS	Zenit Kaliningrad (M.R.)	30	9	10	11	24	29	−5	28	
9	RUS	Torpedo Rostov-na-Donu	30	9	9	12	35	52	−17	27	
10	KAZ	Urozhai Alma-Ata (Note: Urozhai Alma-Ata was called Lokomotiv.)	30	7	12	11	24	32	−8	26	
11	RUS	Krylya Sovetov Molotov	30	8	9	13	24	41	−17	25	
12	RUS	Avangard Sverdlovsk	30	8	6	16	40	49	−9	22	
13	RUS	Avangard Chelyabinsk	30	8	6	16	28	52	−24	22	
14	UZB	Spartak Tashkent	30	6	9	15	26	44	−18	21	
15	RUS	Torpedo Stalingrad	30	7	5	18	36	55	−19	19	
16	RUS	Energiya Saratov	30	4	10	16	23	45	−22	18	

Source: rsssf.com

=== Number of teams by republics ===
Number	Union republics	Team(s)
11	Russian SFSR	ODO Sverdlovsk, FC Torpedo Gorkiy, FC Neftianik Krasnodar, FC Krylia Sovetov Voronezh, FC Zenit Kaliningrad, FC Torpedo Rostov-na-Donu, FC Krylia Sovetov Molotov, FC Avangard Chelyabinsk, FC Avangard Sverdlovsk, FC Torpedo Stalingrad, FC Energia Saratov
1	Armenian SSR	FC Spartak Yerevan
1	Georgian SSR	ODO Tbilisi
1	Azerbaijan SSR	FC Neftianik Baku
1	Kazakh SSR	FC Urozhai Alma-Ata
1	Uzbek SSR	FC Spartak Tashkent

== See also ==
- 1955 Soviet Class A
- 1955 Soviet Cup
