= Boris Cebotari =

Moldovan footballer (1975–2012)

Personal information
- Date of birth: 3 February 1975
- Place of birth: Sărăteni, Moldavian SSR, Soviet Union
- Date of death: 15 July 2012 (aged 37)
- Place of death: Chișinău, Moldova
- Height: 1.87 m (6 ft 2 in)
- Position: Midfielder

Senior career*
Years	Team	Apps	(Gls)
1992–1998	Zimbru Chişinău	120	(24)
1999	Tiligul Tiraspol	5	(0)
1999	Zimbru Chişinău	15	(2)
2000	Agro Chişinău	17	(4)
2000–2004	Zimbru Chişinău	86	(16)
2004–2006	Volyn Lutsk	56	(2)
2006–2007	Zimbru Chişinău	22	(1)
2007–2008	CSCA-Steaua Chişinău		

International career
1994–2006	Moldova	39	(1)
- * Club domestic league appearances and goals

Boris Cebotari (3 February 1975 – 15 July 2012) was a Moldovan footballer.

== Early life ==
Boris Cebotari was born on 3 February 1975 in Sărăteni.

== Football career ==
In April 2004, Cebotari moved to Ukraine at Volyn Lutsk after he played over 200 games for Zimbru.

His last club was CSCA-Steaua Chişinău. He played his last official match for Moldova on 13 October 2004 against Scotland. In the whole 2006 FIFA World Cup qualification, he played for three times. He also played in UEFA Euro 2004 Qualifying matches.

=== International goal ===
Scores and results list Moldova's goal tally first.

#	Date	Venue	Opponent	Score	Result	Competition
1.	29 March 2003	Dinamo Stadium, Minsk	Belarus	1–0	1–2	UEFA Euro 2004 qualification

== Personal life ==
Cebotari was married with two children. It was reported that he had lived alone in his sister's apartment for a while until his death.

== Death ==
On 15 July 2012, his body was found by neighbours in front of his home district "Botanica", in Chișinău. He was 37.

== Honours ==
- Zimbru Chişinău
  - Moldovan Cup: 2002–03
