= Aleksei Zhdanov =

Russian footballer

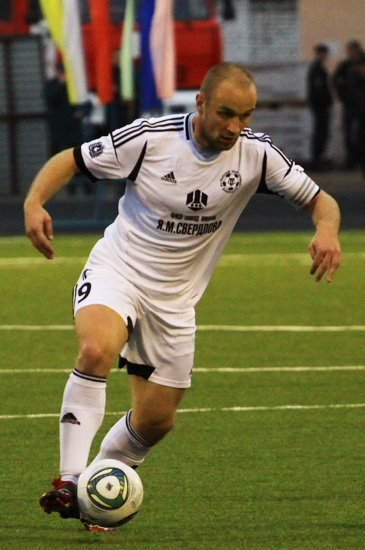

Personal information
- Full name: Aleksei Gennadyevich Zhdanov
- Date of birth: 28 March 1982 (age 44)
- Place of birth: Stary Oskol, Russian SFSR
- Height: 1.82 m (6 ft 0 in)
- Position: Forward

Youth career
- FC Olimpia Volgograd

Senior career*
Years	Team	Apps	(Gls)
2000–2005	FC Olimpia Volgograd	162	(53)
2006	FK Ventspils	5	(0)
2006–2008	FC Zimbru Chişinău	54	(27)
2008	FC Nosta Novotroitsk	5	(0)
2009	FC Volgograd	32	(23)
2010–2011	FC Luch-Energiya Vladivostok	44	(7)
2011	FC Neftekhimik Nizhnekamsk	11	(1)
2012	FC Metallurg-Oskol Stary Oskol	9	(2)
2012–2013	FC Khimik Dzerzhinsk	26	(11)
2013–2014	FC Sever Murmansk	30	(14)
2014	FC Zenit-Izhevsk	12	(5)
2016–2017	FC Rotor Volgograd	29	(23)
2017–2018	FC Armavir	27	(2)
2018	FC Kuban-Holding Pavlovskaya (amateur)		
2019	FC Torpedo Volzhsky (amateur)		

Managerial career
- 2020–2021: FC Rotor Volgograd (U19)
- 2021: FC Rotor-2 Volgograd
- 2021: FC Rotor Volgograd (caretaker)
- 2022: FC Rotor-2 Volgograd
- 2022–2023: FC Armavir (Russia)
- 2023–2024: FC Nart Cherkessk
- * Club domestic league appearances and goals

Aleksei Gennadyevich Zhdanov (Russian: Алексей Геннадьевич Жданов; born 28 March 1982) is a Russian football coach and a former player.

== Club career ==
He played 3 seasons in the Russian Football National League for FC Nosta Novotroitsk and FC Luch-Energiya Vladivostok.

== Honours ==
- Russian Second Division/Russian Professional Football League, Zone South top scorer: 2005 (15 goals), 2009 (23 goals), 2016–17 (23 goals).
- Russian Second Division, Zone South best striker: 2009.
