= Antonin Sochnev =

Soviet footballer (1924–2012)

Personal information
- Full name: Antonin Nikolayevich Sochnev
- Date of birth: 4 June 1924
- Place of birth: Yudino, Vologda Oblast, Russian SFSR
- Date of death: 24 June 2012 (aged 88)
- Place of death: Moscow, Russia
- Position: Forward

Youth career
- FC Krasnoye Znamya Ivanovo

Senior career*
Years	Team	Apps	(Gls)
1943–1944	KBF Leningrad		
1944	Lobanov Unit Team Leningrad		
1945	Balti Laevastik Tallinn		
1945	KBF Leningrad		
1946	VMS Moscow	4	(0)
1946	VMF Moscow		
1946	CDKA Moscow	0	(0)
1947–1952	FC Torpedo Moscow	118	(28)
1954–1955	FC Trudovyye Rezervy Leningrad	30	(13)
1955	FC Krasnoye Znamya Ivanovo	17	(4)
1956	FC Burevestnik Likino-Dulyovo		

Managerial career
- 1956: FC Burevestnik Likino-Dulyovo
- 1959–1961: FC Energiya Volzhsky
- 1962–1963: SC Tavriya Simferopol
- 1964: FC Trudovye Rezervy Kislovodsk
- 1965: FC Kovrovets Kovrov
- 1966: FC Neftyanik Almetyevsk
- 1967–1969: FC Kolos Pavlovskaya
- * Club domestic league appearances and goals

Antonin Nikolayevich Sochnev (Russian: Антонин Николаевич Сочнев; 4 June 1924 in Yudino, Vologda Oblast – 24 June 2012 in Moscow) was a Soviet Russian football player and coach.

He served in the Navy in World War II on Marat battleship.

== Honours ==
- Soviet Top League top scorer: 11 goals (1954).
