= 1988 Soviet Second League =

Second League
- Season: 1988

The 1989 Soviet Second League (Russian: Чемпионат СССР по футболу 1988: Вторая лига) was the Soviet third tier competitions of the Soviet football championship. The competitions of the league were conducted as part of the whole Soviet event and were split in nine groups geographically as regional zones. There were 169 teams that completed the season with the most teams (26) competing in the Zone VI and smallest zones IV and IX having 16 teams. In the article a regional designation in parentheses is conditional (for better perspective) and was never actually openly publicized.

The competitions were composed of two stages starting with nine zonal groups, nine winners of which would qualify for three group promotional double round-robin tournaments (Zone Finals), three winners of those would actually gain their promotions. The "Zone Finals" took place on October 25 through November 12, 1988.

The main tie-breaker on points tie was number of wins, therefore in the Zone II Metallurg Magnitogorsk placed 8th above Lokomotiv Gorkiy and Dinamo Kirov. In case of points tie occurring for the first place, a separate play-off was to be scheduled.

== Zonal tournament ==
=== Zone I (Central) ===
Pos	Team	Pld	W	D	L	GF	GA	GD	Pts
1	Fakel Voronezh	38	24	7	7	73	26	+47	55
2	Dinamo Vologda	38	22	8	8	67	36	+31	52
3	Torpedo Ryazan (Note: Sapfir Ryazan changed name to Torpedo.)	38	19	8	11	49	29	+20	46
4	Zarya Kaluga	38	19	7	12	50	37	+13	45
5	Saturn Ramenskoye	38	18	9	11	51	43	+8	45
6	Spartak Kostroma	38	18	8	12	57	39	+18	44
7	Textilshchik Ivanovo	38	18	6	14	66	45	+21	42
8	Zorkiy Krasnogorsk	38	16	10	12	47	29	+18	42
9	Znamya Truda Orekhovo-Zuyevo	38	16	9	13	54	43	+11	41
10	Torpedo Vladimir	38	15	11	12	51	55	−4	41
11	Karabakh Stepanakert [AZE]	38	17	6	15	44	38	+6	40
12	CSKA-2 Moskva	38	15	5	18	43	59	−16	35
13	Volzhanin Kineshma	38	13	9	16	39	55	−16	35
14	Krasnaya Presnya Moskva	38	13	8	17	44	49	−5	34
15	Dinamo-2 Moskva	38	11	12	15	29	39	−10	34
16	Arsenal Tula	38	12	7	19	56	61	−5	31
17	Saturn Rybinsk	38	10	11	17	48	71	−23	31
18	Salyut Belgorod	38	10	6	22	38	66	−28	26
19	SK ESVSM Moskva	38	5	11	22	36	74	−38	21
20	Volga Kalinin	38	5	10	23	25	73	−48	20

=== Zone II (Volga/Ural) ===
Pos	Team	Pld	W	D	L	GF	GA	GD	Pts
1	UralMash Sverdlovsk	32	21	7	4	49	25	+24	49
2	Zenit Izhevsk	32	18	5	9	54	28	+26	41
3	Krylya Sovetov Kuibyshev	32	15	9	8	50	28	+22	39
4	Gastello Ufa	32	15	7	10	35	25	+10	37
5	Druzhba Yoshkar-Ola	32	15	4	13	37	44	−7	34
6	Uralets Nizhniy Tagil	32	14	6	12	40	36	+4	34
7	Rubin Kazan	32	13	5	14	30	28	+2	31
8	Metallurg Magnitogorsk	32	12	6	14	32	39	−7	30
9	Lokomotiv Gorkiy	32	10	10	12	30	27	+3	30
10	Dinamo Kirov	32	10	10	12	31	37	−6	30
11	Torpedo Miass	32	12	5	15	37	39	−2	29
12	Khimik Dzerzhinsk	32	11	7	14	33	30	+3	29
13	Torpedo Kurgan	32	11	7	14	30	40	−10	29
14	Torpedo Naberezhnyye Chelny (Note: Turbina Naberezhnyye Chelny changed name to Torpedo.)	32	8	12	12	32	36	−4	28
15	Torpedo Togliatti	32	10	6	16	30	42	−12	26
16	Stal Cheboksary	32	11	3	18	29	51	−22	25
17	Start Ulyanovsk	32	9	5	18	19	43	−24	23

=== Zone III (South) ===
Pos	Rep	Team	Pld	W	D	L	GF	GA	GD	Pts	
1	RUS	Torpedo Taganrog	38	20	8	10	58	40	+18	48	First place play-off
2	RUS	Cement Novorossiysk	38	19	10	9	43	32	+11	48	First place play-off
3	RUS	Spartak Nalchik	38	21	4	13	66	40	+26	46	
4	RUS	Druzhba Maykop	38	20	6	12	58	35	+23	46	
5	RUS	Spartak Tambov	38	20	5	13	53	47	+6	45	
6	GEO	Dinamo Sukhumi	38	18	7	13	55	42	+13	43	
7	RUS	Metallurg Lipetsk	38	17	9	12	63	34	+29	43	
8	GEO	Lokomotiv Samtredia	38	19	4	15	58	57	+1	42	
9	ARM	Spartak Oktemberyan	38	18	5	15	65	58	+7	41	
10	GEO	Mertskhali Makharadze	38	18	3	17	52	60	−8	39	
11	GEO	Kolkheti Poti	38	17	5	16	48	56	−8	39	
12	ARM	Lori Kirovakan	38	17	5	16	49	54	−5	39	
13	RUS	Mashuk Pyatigorsk	38	13	9	16	43	42	+1	35	
14	RUS	Volgar Astrakhan	38	15	3	20	48	58	−10	33	
15	RUS	Uralan Elista	38	14	4	20	59	53	+6	32	
16	RUS	Nart Cherkessk	38	12	7	19	44	58	−14	31	
17	RUS	Spartak Anapa	38	13	4	21	41	51	−10	30	
18	RUS	Luch Azov	38	12	6	20	38	46	−8	30	
19	ARM	Iskra Yerevan	38	11	6	21	43	77	−34	28	
20	ARM	Olimpia Leninakan	38	8	6	24	31	75	−44	22	

Notes:

Match for 1st place

Cement Novorossiysk  2-0 Torpedo Taganrog

=== Zone IV (Far East) ===
Pos	Team	Pld	W	D	L	GF	GA	GD	Pts
1	Irtysh Omsk	30	16	9	5	42	15	+27	41
2	Lokomotiv Chita	30	17	4	9	46	31	+15	38
3	Metallurg Novokuznetsk	30	13	9	8	38	30	+8	35
4	Amur Blagoveshchensk	30	15	4	11	45	34	+11	34
5	Zvezda Irkutsk	30	13	8	9	37	30	+7	34
6	Dinamo Barnaul	30	11	12	7	39	27	+12	34
7	Okean Nakhodka	30	11	10	9	22	21	+1	32
8	SKA Khabarovsk	30	12	7	11	28	30	−2	31
9	Amur Komsomolsk-na-Amure	30	12	7	11	33	31	+2	31
10	Torpedo Rubtsovsk	30	12	6	12	33	33	0	30
11	Luch Vladivostok	30	10	9	11	27	37	−10	29
12	Tom Tomsk (Note: Manometr Tomsk changed name to Tom.)	30	8	9	13	25	32	−7	25
13	Avtomobilist Krasnoyarsk	30	9	6	15	28	43	−15	24
14	Chkalovets Novosibirsk	30	10	3	17	30	39	−9	23
15	Progress Biysk	30	7	6	17	23	48	−25	20
16	Selenga Ulan-Ude	30	7	5	18	17	32	−15	19

=== Zone V (Soviet Republics) ===
Pos	Rep	Team	Pld	W	D	L	GF	GA	GD	Pts
1	MDA	Nistru Kishinev	34	21	11	2	84	34	+50	53
2	LTU	Atlantas Klaipeda	34	18	12	4	58	24	+34	48
3	MDA	Textilshchik Tiraspol	34	19	8	7	61	27	+34	46
4	BLR	Dnepr Mogilyov	34	19	8	7	49	36	+13	46
5	BLR	Khimik Grodno	34	18	10	6	48	31	+17	46
6	RUS	Dinamo Bryansk	34	16	6	12	49	47	+2	38
7	LVA	Zvejnieks Liepaja	34	11	14	9	46	33	+13	36
8	EST	Sport Tallinn	34	11	14	9	33	28	+5	36
9	RUS	Iskra Smolensk	34	14	7	13	42	34	+8	35
10	BLR	Dinamo Brest	34	14	6	14	43	41	+2	34
11	RUS	Baltika Kaliningrad	34	11	7	16	40	46	−6	29
12	RUS	Avangard Kursk	34	8	13	13	27	46	−19	29
13	RUS	Dinamo Leningrad	34	7	15	12	41	42	−1	29
14	BLR	GomSelMash Gomel	34	9	8	17	26	44	−18	26
15	RUS	Spartak Oryol	34	7	11	16	31	42	−11	25
16	MDA	Zarya Beltsy	34	6	11	17	28	60	−32	23
17	BLR	Vityaz Vitebsk	34	3	12	19	16	57	−41	18
18	LVA	RSVSM-RAF Jelgava	34	5	5	24	23	73	−50	15

=== Zone VI (Ukraine) ===
Pos	Team	Pld	W	D	L	GF	GA	GD	Pts	Qualification or relegation
1	Bukovyna Chernivtsi (C)	50	27	16	7	85	31	+54	70	Qualified for zone finals
2	Vorskla Poltava	50	30	8	12	70	42	+28	68	
3	SKA Odesa	50	25	14	11	65	46	+19	64	
4	Okean Kerch	50	24	11	15	71	60	+11	59	
5	Podillya Khmelnytskyi	50	23	13	14	71	51	+20	59	
6	Kryvbas Kryvyi Rih	50	21	14	15	52	45	+7	56	
7	Chayka Sevastopol	50	20	16	14	68	56	+12	56	
8	Torpedo Lutsk	50	21	13	16	60	64	−4	55	
9	Naftovyk Okhtyrka	50	20	15	15	63	54	+9	55	
10	Sudnobudivnyk Mykolaiv	50	22	10	18	66	51	+15	54	
11	Shakhtar Pavlohrad	50	21	9	20	71	75	−4	51	
12	Nyva Ternopil	50	19	13	18	66	59	+7	51	
13	Spartak Zhytomyr	50	18	15	17	57	56	+1	51	
14	Avanhard Rivne	50	21	8	21	52	56	−4	50	
15	Zakarpattia Uzhhorod	50	17	15	18	74	59	+15	49	
16	Novator Zhdanov	50	16	17	17	57	55	+2	49	
17	Prykarpattia Ivano-Frankivsk	50	15	19	16	51	47	+4	49	
18	Krystal Kherson	50	16	15	19	48	52	−4	47	
19	Nyva Vinnytsia	50	15	14	21	47	59	−12	44	
20	Dynamo Bila Tserkva	50	14	15	21	52	63	−11	43	
21	Desna Chernihiv	50	14	14	22	42	59	−17	42	Moved out to different group (zone)
22	Dnipro Cherkasy	50	16	9	25	57	77	−20	41	
23	Zirka Kirovohrad	50	13	15	22	39	60	−21	41	
24	Torpedo Zaporizhzhia	50	13	12	25	55	71	−16	38	
25	Mayak Kharkiv	50	7	20	23	35	68	−33	34	
26	Shakhtar Horlivka	50	8	8	34	35	93	−58	24	Relegation to the Fitness clubs competitions (KFK)

(C) Champions

=== Zone VII (Central Asia) ===
Pos	Rep	Team	Pld	W	D	L	GF	GA	GD	Pts
1	UZB	Neftyanik Fergana	36	21	10	5	62	22	+40	52
2	UZB	Kasansayets Kasansay	36	19	10	7	61	37	+24	48
3	UZB	Novbahor Namangan (Note: Avtomobilist Namangan changed name to Novbahor.)	36	20	6	10	50	29	+21	46
4	UZB	Sohibkor Halkabad	36	20	4	12	64	53	+11	44
5	TKM	Kopet-Dag Ashkhabad (Note: Kolhozchi Ashkhabad changed name to Kopet-Dag.)	36	21	1	14	68	41	+27	43
6	UZB	Zarafshan Navoi	36	18	7	11	58	41	+17	43
7	AZE	Araz Nahichevan	36	18	1	17	52	54	−2	37
8	UZB	Hanki Yangiaryk	36	16	5	15	60	50	+10	37
9	TJK	Vakhsh Kurgan-Tyube	36	14	7	15	52	59	−7	35
10	UZB	Yeshlik Jizak	36	13	9	14	46	52	−6	35
11	UZB	Tselinnik Turtkul	36	13	8	15	40	44	−4	34
12	UZB	Traktor Tashkent	36	13	7	16	43	58	−15	33
13	UZB	Avtomobilist Kokand	36	13	6	17	35	42	−7	32
14	UZB	Dinamo Samarkand	36	13	5	18	46	60	−14	31
15	TJK	Hojent Leninabad	36	13	5	18	34	52	−18	31
16	UZB	Surhan Termez	36	9	11	16	36	48	−12	29
17	UZB	Pahtakor Andizhan	36	10	8	18	43	54	−11	28
18	UZB	Yangiyer	36	9	9	18	36	57	−21	27
19	UZB	Metallurg Almalyk	36	8	3	25	27	60	−33	19

=== Zone VIII (Kazakhstan) ===
Pos	Rep	Team	Pld	W	D	L	GF	GA	GD	Pts
1		Traktor Pavlodar	32	22	3	7	62	27	+35	47
2	KGZ	Alga Frunze	32	19	4	9	64	32	+32	42
3		Energetik Kustanay	32	18	4	10	51	44	+7	40
4		Meliorator Chimkent	32	17	6	9	65	31	+34	40
5		Shakhtyor Karaganda	32	17	6	9	43	28	+15	40
6		Meliorator Kzil-Orda	32	15	8	9	51	39	+12	38
7		Spartak Semipalatinsk	32	16	5	11	49	35	+14	37
8		Aktyubinets Aktyubinsk	32	16	5	11	33	30	+3	37
9		Khimik Jambul	32	15	4	13	47	37	+10	34
10		Vostok Ust-Kamenogorsk	32	13	7	12	55	46	+9	33
11	KGZ	Alay Osh	32	14	1	17	38	49	−11	29
12		Tselinnik Tselinograd	32	11	7	14	32	41	−9	29
13		Ekibastuzets Ekibastuz	32	11	6	15	41	41	0	28
14		Jezkazganets Jezkazgan	32	8	9	15	31	49	−18	25
15		Zhetysu Taldy-Kurgan	32	8	7	17	35	45	−10	23
16		Avangard Petropavlovsk	32	7	5	20	35	75	−40	19
17		SKIF Alma-Ata	32	0	3	29	12	95	−83	3

=== Zone IX (Caucasus) ===
Pos	Rep	Team	Pld	W	D	L	GF	GA	GD	Pts
1	GEO	Torpedo Kutaisi	30	24	4	2	70	21	+49	52
2	AZE	Kyapaz Kirovabad	30	20	3	7	79	28	+51	43
3	GEO	Metallurg Rustavi	30	19	5	6	63	28	+35	43
4	RUS	Sokol Saratov	30	18	5	7	65	39	+26	41
5	AZE	Goyazan Kazakh	30	15	5	10	50	36	+14	35
6	RUS	Textilshchik Kamyshin	30	13	7	10	49	36	+13	33
7	RUS	Dinamo Makhachkala	30	13	5	12	44	38	+6	31
8	RUS	Atommash Volgodonsk	30	12	7	11	44	40	+4	31
9	RUS	Terek Grozny	30	12	7	11	43	39	+4	31
10	GEO	Dila Gori	30	12	5	13	45	52	−7	29
11	AZE	Hazar Sumgait (Note: Voskhod Sumgait changed name to Hazar.)	30	11	6	13	39	48	−9	28
12	RUS	Torpedo Volzhskiy	30	9	5	16	29	43	−14	23
13	RUS	Lokomotiv Mineralnyye Vody	30	8	4	18	29	54	−25	20
14	GEO	Shevardeni Tbilisi	30	8	4	18	33	61	−28	20
15	GEO	MCOP-Lokomotiv Tbilisi	30	5	4	21	32	72	−40	14
16	AZE	MCOP-Bakinets Baku	30	2	2	26	15	94	−79	6

== Zone Finals ==
=== Group 1 ===
Pos	Rep	Team	Pld	W	D	L	GF	GA	GD	Pts	Promotion
1	MDA	Nistru Kishinev	4	3	1	0	7	3	+4	7	Promoted
2	UZB	Neftyanik Fergana	4	2	1	1	3	2	+1	5	
3	RUS	Irtysh Omsk	4	0	0	4	2	7	−5	0	

=== Group 2 ===
Pos	Rep	Team	Pld	W	D	L	GF	GA	GD	Pts	Promotion
1	GEO	Torpedo Kutaisi	4	1	3	0	6	3	+3	5	Promoted
2	RUS	Cement Novorossiysk	4	1	2	1	4	6	−2	4	
3	KAZ	Traktor Pavlodar	4	1	1	2	5	6	−1	3	

=== Group 3 ===
Pos	Rep	Team	Pld	W	D	L	GF	GA	GD	Pts	Promotion
1	RUS	Fakel Voronezh	4	3	0	1	9	2	+7	6	Promoted
2	UKR	Bukovina Chernovtsy	4	3	0	1	6	4	+2	6	
3	RUS	UralMash Sverdlovsk	4	0	0	4	1	10	−9	0	

Source: rsssf.com
