= FC Lokomotyv Kharkiv =

Lokomotyv Kharkiv
- Full name: Lokomotyv Kharkiv
- Founded: 1923
- Dissolved: 1955
- Owner: Southern Railways

FC Lokomotyv Kharkiv (Ukrainian: Локомотив Харків) was a football club from Kharkiv, owned by the Southern Railways of Ukraine.

== History ==
The club was formed in 1923 in Kharkiv under the name "Red Rail Worker" (Ukrainian: Червоний залізничник, romanized: Chervonyj zaliznychnyk; Russian: Красный железнодорожник, romanized: Krasnyj Zheleznodorozhnik). The club entered official Soviet competitions in 1936 Soviet Cup as Lokomotyv Kharkiv (Russian: Lokomotiv Kharkov).

In league competitions the team appeared in 1938 playing in the first group of the Ukrainian SSR championship and replacing "Stalinets" team that represented electric-mechanical factory.

After the World War II, in 1945 the team was admitted to the Soviet second tier competitions known as the Second Group along with two other teams from the Ukrainian SSR, Kharchovyk Odesa (today Chornomorets) and Shakhtar Stalino.

Lokomotyv was a participant of the Soviet Top League and sometimes is erroneously considered as a direct predecessor of Metalist Kharkiv.

In 1956 the club was replaced by Avanhard Kharkiv (Metalist Kharkiv) and dissolved.

== League history ==
Season	Div.	Pl.	G	W	D	L	Goals	Pts	Soviet Cup	Ukrainian Cup	Notes
1936	no known league record								1/32 final	DNP	
1937	no known league record								1/32 final	1/32 final	
1938	Ukr 1	12_{/12}	11	2	0	9	18–40	15	1/32 final	1/8 final	
1939	Ukr 1	3_{/11}	9	5	2	2	11–9	21		1/8 final	
1940	no known league record									1/16 final	
1941–1943	World War II (no official records)										
1944	no known league record								1/8 final	2nd among 4	
1945	2	8_{/18}	42	15	10	17	58–63	40	1/8 final	Winner	
1946	2	3_{/13}	42	19	15	8	65–35	50		Finalist	
1947	2	1_{/13}	36	20	13	3	91–31	53	Regional stage	1/2 finals	qualified for finals
1947	2	3_{/6}	5	3	1	1	7–4	7	Regional stage	1/2 finals	
1948	2	1_{/8}	14	8	5	1	40–10	21	1/4 final	DNP	qualified for Ukrainian finals
1948	2	1_{/4}	4	3	1	0	10–3	7	1/4 final	DNP	qualified for finals
1948	2	1_{/6}	5	3	1	1	11–3	7	1/4 final	DNP	Promoted
1949	1	12_{/18}	34	10	10	14	41–51	30	1/8 final		
1950	1	16_{/19}	36	12	4	20	33–52	28	1/16 final		Relegated
1951	2	6_{/18}	34	17	9	8	60–38	43	1/16 final		
1952	2	2_{/6}	5	2	3	0	5–1	7	1/8 final		host; qualified for finals
1952	2	1_{/9}	16	9	3	4	21–11	21	1/8 final		Promoted
1953	1	9_{/11}	20	6	4	10	19–34	16	1/8 final		
1954	1	12_{/13}	24	6	5	13	19–39	17	1/16 final		Relegated
1955	2	9_{/16}	30	12	6	12	48–34	30	Regional stage		Replaced

== Awards ==
- Soviet second tier
  - Winner (2): 1948 (Vtoraya Gruppa), 1952 (Class B)
- Cup of the Ukrainian SSR
  - Winner (1): 1945
  - Finalist (2): 1944, 1946

== See also ==
- MFC Lokomotyv Kharkiv, a futsal club
