= Montini (toy) =

Construction toy

Montini was a Dutch brand of Lego-like building bricks, manufactured between 1961 and 1969.

Montini blocks were produced by Berco Lux in Tiel. The bricks were compatible with Lego bricks, though the studs on the bricks were taller. The blocks were moulded in a flexible tough polypropylene, making them softer than Lego blocks.

Ongoing patent litigation by Lego led to Montini stopping production in 1969.
