= Vladislav Gavriliuc =

Moldovan footballer

Personal information
- Full name: Vladislav Gavriliuc
- Date of birth: 7 March 1972 (age 54)
- Place of birth: Mohyliv-Podilskyi, Vinnytsia Oblast, Ukraine
- Position: Striker

Senior career*
Years	Team	Apps	(Gls)
1992–1994	FC Nistru Otaci		
1994–2002	FC Zimbru Chişinău		
1996	FC Nistru Otaci		
1997–1999	FC Zimbru Chișinău		
2000	FC Nistru Otaci		
2000–2002	FC Zimbru Chișinău		

International career
1995–1996	Moldova	4	(0)
- * Club domestic league appearances and goals

Vladislav Gavriliuc (born 7 March 1972 in Mohyliv-Podilskyi) is a retired Moldovan footballer who played as striker. He played for FC Nistru Otaci between 1992 and 1994 and FC Zimbru Chişinău between 1994 and 2002. Gavriliuc was the Moldovan National Division top scorer in successive years in the 1994-95 season scoring 20 goals, and in the 1995-96 season scoring 34 goals. Vladislav Gavriliuc was capped internationally by Moldova between 1995 and 1996 earning four caps.

== Honours ==
- Moldovan National Division (5): 1995, 1996, 1998, 1999, 2000
- Moldovan Cup (2): 1997, 1998

Individual

- Divizia Națională Top Scorer (2): 1994-1995, 1995-1996
