= Sergiu Chirilov =

Moldovan footballer (born 1973)

Personal information
- Date of birth: 5 June 1973 (age 53)
- Place of birth: Șoldănești, Moldovan SSR, Soviet Union
- Height: 1.85 m (6 ft 1 in)
- Position: Forward

Senior career*
Years	Team	Apps	(Gls)
1990	Nistru Chișinău	7	(0)
1991–1992	Zimbru Chișinău	28	(6)
1992–1993	Olimpia Satu Mare	3	(0)
1993–1996	Sportul Studențesc	40	(2)
1996–1997	Charleroi	13	(3)
1998–2000	Nistru Otaci	36	(15)
1998–1999	→ Constructorul Chișinău (loan)	6	(3)
1999–2000	→ Rapid București (loan)	1	(0)
2000–2002	Unirea Alba Iulia	0	(0)
2002–2003	Agro Chișinău	13	(3)
2003	SKA-Energia	9	(2)
2003–2004	Zob Ahan Isfahan	14	(0)
2004–2007	Zimbru Chișinău	72	(30)
Total		242	(64)

International career
1994–1995	Moldova U-21	4	(1)
1991–1999	Moldova	12	(0)

Managerial career
- 2007–2008: Moldova U-21 (assistant)
- 2008: Moldova U-16
- 2008–2013: Moldova U-21
- 2013–2015: Zimbru 2 Chișinău
- 2015: Aktobe (assistant)
- 2017–2018: Moldova U-17
- 2020–2021: Codru Lozova (assistant)
- * Club domestic league appearances and goals

Sergiu Chirilov (pronounced with a [k]; born 5 June 1973) is a Moldovan football manager, futsal player and former professional footballer.

== Club career ==
Chirilov has played in the national championships of Moldova, Romania and Iran, at clubs like Zimbru Chișinău, Rapid București, Sportul Studențesc, Zob Ahan.

== International career ==
Between 1991 and 1999, Chirilov played 12 matches for Moldova national team.

== Managerial career ==
Sergiu Chirilov has the UEFA "PRO" lincense for coaches. In 2007 – July 2008, he was the second coach at the Moldova U-21 national football team. In 2008, he became head coach of the Moldova U-16 national team. From 2008 to 2010 he was the head coach of the Moldova U-21 national football team, obtaining in his debut match a victory of 1–0 against Germany U-21. In 2012-2013 he worked as sport-director at the club Real-Succes. Since 19 June 2013 he has been the head coach of the second team FC Zimbru Chișinău.

== Honours ==
Zimbru Chișinău

- Moldovan National Division: 1992
- Moldovan Cup: 2007

Rapid București

- Liga I runner-up: 1999–2000

Zob Ahan

- Iran Pro League runner-up: 2004
