= 1952 Soviet Cup =

1952 Cup of USSR in Football
Кубок СССР

Tournament details
- Country: Soviet Union
- Dates: August 21 – November 2
- Teams: 50

Final positions
- Champions: Torpedo Moscow
- Runners-up: Spartak Moscow

The 1952 Soviet Cup was an association football cup competition of the Soviet Union.

The defending champions CDSA Moscow did not take part due to political sanctions by the Soviet government.

== Participating teams ==
Enter in First round
Class A 14/14 teams	Class B 18/18 teams	Republican 18 teams
✓ Spartak Moscow; ✓ Dinamo Kiev; ✓ Dinamo Moscow; ✓ Dinamo Tbilisi; ✓ Dinamo Leningrad; ✓ Kalinin; ✓ Zenit Leningrad; ✓ Krylia Sovetov Kuibyshev; ✓ Lokomotiv Moscow; ✓ Torpedo Moscow; ✓ VVS Moscow; ✓ Daugava Riga; ✓ Shakhter Stalino; ✓ Dynamo Minsk	✓ Lokomotiv Kharkov; ✓ Spartak Vilnius; ✓ DO Tbilisi; ✓ Krasnoye Znamia Ivanovo; ✓ VMS Moscow; ✓ Torpedo Gorkiy; ✓ Neftianik Baku; ✓ Burevestnik Kishenev; ✓ Dinamo Alma-Ata; ✓ Dinamo Yerevan; ✓ Torpedo Stalingrad; ✓ DO Sverdlovsk; ✓ Krasnaya Zvezda Petrozavodsk; ✓ DO Kiev; ✓ Kalev Tallinn; ✓ DO Tashkent; ✓ Dinamo Stalinabad; ✓ Spartak Ashkhabad	✓ DO Petrozavodsk (Karelia); ✓ KBF Tallinn (Estonia); ✓ DO Riga (Latvia); ✓ DO Vilnius (Lithuania); ✓ Spartak Minsk (Belarus); ✓ Metallurg Zaporozhye (Ukraine); ✓ Burevestnik Bendery (Moldova); ✓ Trud (TTU) Tbilisi (Georgia); ✓ Stroitel Leninakan (Armenia); ✓ Zavod im.Budennogo Baku (Azerbaijan); ✓ Stroitel Ust-Kamenogorsk (Kazakhstan); ✓ Dinamo Tashkent (Uzbekistan); ✓ Dinamo Frunze (Kirgizia); ✓ Dinamo-2 Stalinabad (Tajikistan); ✓ ODO Ashkhabad (Turkmenia); ✓ Molotov (RSFSR); ✓ Dinamo-2 Moscow; ✓ VMS-2 Leningrad

Source: []

== Competition schedule ==
=== First round ===
[Aug 24] 
Stroitel Leninakan           2-2  DO Tashkent 
  [Boyajan-2, Suetin, Mavromatis] 
[Sep 6] 
DO Petrozavodsk              0-13 DINAMO Yerevan           [in Leningrad] 
  [Viktor Merkulov-5, Karajan-5, Arutyun Kegeyan-2, Abramyan] 
[Sep 7] 
ODO Ashkhabad                0-5  TORPEDO Stalingrad 
  [Mikhail Gurkin-2, Serafim Arzamastsev-2, Makarashvili] 
[Sep 21] 
DINAMO-2 Stalinabad          w/o  Kalev Tallinn 
Metallurg Zaporozhye         2-4  SPARTAK Vilnius 
  [O.Kiknadze, N.Malakhov – R.Prihockis, M.Dauksa, S.Petraitis, M.Skelovas]

==== First round replays ====
[Aug 25] 
STROITEL Leninakan           2-0  DO Tashkent 
  [Petrosyan, Boyajan]

=== Second round ===
[Aug 24] 
Dinamo-2 Moskva              0-1  DO Kiev 
  [Ognyov] 
[Aug 27] 
Krylya Sovetov Molotov       1-2  DINAMO Alma-Ata  
[Sep 7] 
DO Riga                      5-1  Krasnaya Zvezda Petrozavodsk  
  [Balykin-2, Lysenkov-2, Ogerchuk – Starovoitov pen] 
MVO Kalinin                  4-2  Dinamo Kiev                  [aet] 
  [Valentin Nikolayev 45, Alexei Grinin 53, Vladimir Dyomin 77, 104 – Viktor Zhilin 5, Zoltan Sengetovskiy 48] 
Shakhtyor Stalino            1-3  LOKOMOTIV Moskva 
  [Ivan Fedosov 24 – Boris Lagutin 9, Igor Petrov 34, Boris Pirogov 85] 
ZiB Baku                     0-5  DO Sverdlovsk 
  [Listochkin-3, Ivanov, Bushuyev] 
[Sep 8] 
Spartak Minsk                0-2  DO Tbilisi 
  [A.Paichadze 37, A.Khurtsidze 70] 
[Sep 9] 
DO Vilnius                   0-0  Burevestnik Kishinev 
[Sep 11] 
Dinamo Tashkent              0-5  NEFTYANIK Baku 
  [A.Terentyev-2, Kuznetsov, Anoshkin, Mamedov] 
[Sep 12] 
Torpedo Moskva               0-0  Dinamo Yerevan 
VMS-2 Leningrad              0-2  LOKOMOTIV Kharkov 
  [Georgiy Borzenko, Bespaly] 
[Sep 14] 
KBF Tallinn                  1-0  Krasnoye Znamya Ivanovo 
  [V.Borzenkov 50] 
[Sep 28] 
DINAMO Minsk                 3-2  Krylya Sovetov Kuibyshev     [aet] 
  [Anatoliy Yegorov, Ivan Mozer, Nikolai Makarov – Yuriy Belousov, Fyodor Novikov] 
[Oct 5] 
Burevestnik Bendery          3-6  VMS Moskva 
  [Kuzmin-2, Khodorovskiy – Yevgeniy Bologov-2, A.Murashov-2, Viktor Rogov] 
DINAMO Frunze                w/o  Dinamo Stalinabad 
Spartak Vilnius              1-1  Torpedo Stalingrad 
  [Vitautas Saunoris – K.Dubovitskiy] 
STROITEL Leninakan           w/o  Dinamo-2 Stalinabad 
TORPEDO Gorkiy               3-2  Stroitel Ust-Kamenogorsk 
  [Alexandr Denisov 12, Vladimir Lazarev 26, Viktor Gorbunov 40 - ? 68, ? 84]

==== Second round replays ====
[Sep 10] 
DO Vilnius                   1-0  Burevestnik Kishinev 
  [Polevoi (B) og] 
[Sep 13] 
TORPEDO Moskva               1-0  Dinamo Yerevan 
  [Vitaliy Vatskevich] 
[Oct 6] 
Spartak Vilnius              1-2  TORPEDO Stalingrad 
  [Georgiy Shmakov (T) og – Popov, Serafim Arzamastsev]

=== Third round ===
[Aug 24] 
TTU Tbilisi                  1-1  Spartak Ashkhabad 
  [Petrosov – Kuchumov] 
[Sep 4] 
Daugava Riga                 1-1  Dinamo Leningrad 
  [Alfons Jegers – Alexei Kolobov] 
[Sep 13] 
TORPEDO Moskva               2-0  Stroitel Leninakan 
  [Yuriy Zolotov 36, Ivan Gorovoi 82] 
[Sep 28] 
DO Vilnius                   w/o  Dinamo Frunze 
[Oct 5] 
MVO Kalinin                  4-1  DO Tbilisi 
  [Alexei Grinin-3, Boris Koverznev – Saakashvili] 
[Oct 8] 
DO Sverdlovsk                5-1  Dinamo Alma-Ata 
  [Listochkin-3, Ivanov, Kozhevnikov – Petrov] 
[Oct 10] 
Neftyanik Baku               2-2  VMS Moskva 
  [Baskov, Mamedov – Yevgeniy Bologov, A.Murashov] 
[Oct 12] 
DO Kiev                      2-0  KBF Tallinn 
  [V.Sevastyanov, A.Voronin] 
LOKOMOTIV Kharkov            2-0  DO Riga 
  [V.Bespaly-2] 
LOKOMOTIV Moskva             6-0  Torpedo Stalingrad 
  [Vasiliy Panfilov-2, Boris Pirogov-2, Boris Lagutin, Igor Petrov] 
Torpedo Gorkiy               0-1  DINAMO Minsk 
  [Ratmir Perzhkhalo]

==== Third round replays ====
[Aug 25] 
TTU Tbilisi                  1-4  SPARTAK Ashkhabad 
  [Shudra – Mavrin, Borkin, Pavlidi, Gaygarov] 
[Sep 5] 
Daugava Riga                 0-3  DINAMO Leningrad 
  [Vasiliy Fomin, Alexei Kolobov, Vladimir Tsvetkov] 
[Oct 11] 
NEFTYANIK Baku               2-0  VMS Moskva 
  [Kagakov, Mamedov]

=== Fourth round ===
[Oct 5] 
Spartak Ashkhabad            2-3  DINAMO Leningrad 
  [Pavlidi-2 – Alexei Kolobov-2, Pyotr Dementyev] 
[Oct 12] 
SPARTAK Moskva               5-1  DO Sverdlovsk 
  [Nikita Simonyan-3, Nikolai Parshin, I.Dominskiy (D) og – B.Ivanov] 
[Oct 15] 
DINAMO Moskva                4-1  DO Vilnius 
  [Vladimir Ilyin 42, Alexandr Tenyagin 68, 76, Vitaliy Zub 88 – Visneuskas 8] 
[Oct 16] 
VVS Moskva                   2-1  Dinamo Minsk                 [aet] 
  [Vsevolod Bobrov 32, 118 – Fyodor Vanzel 67] 
ZENIT Leningrad              2-0  Lokomotiv Kharkov 
  [Nikolai Smirnov 53, Alexandr Ivanov 80] 
[Oct 17] 
DO Kiev                      2-1  Lokomotiv Moskva 
  [A.Bogdanovich-2 – Vasiliy Panfilov] 
[Oct 19] 
TORPEDO Moskva               4-0  Neftyanik Baku           [in Kharkov] 
  [Vladimir Nechayev 18, Vitaliy Vatskevich 57, Yuriy Chaiko ?, Ivan Gorovoi ?] 
[Oct 20] 
MVO Kalinin                  2-1  Dinamo Tbilisi           [in Kiev] 
  [Anatoliy A.Ilyin 30, Yuriy Nyrkov 75 – Mikhail Jojua ?]

=== Quarterfinals ===
[Oct 19] 
DINAMO Leningrad             2-0  VVS Moskva 
  [Vasiliy Fomin 17, 54] 
[Oct 21] 
SPARTAK Moskva               3-0  Dinamo Moskva            [in Kiev] 
  [Nikita Simonyan 20, 63, Alexandr Rystsov 23] 
[Oct 23] 
TORPEDO Moskva               3-1  Zenit Leningrad          [in Kharkov] 
  [Valentin Petrov 5, Vladimir Nechayev 16, Vitaliy Vatskevich 19 – Nikolai Smirnov 62] 
[Oct 24] 
DO Kiev                      2-0  MVO Kalinin 
  [Bondarenko 3, 32]

=== Semifinals ===
[Oct 28] 
SPARTAK Moskva               2-0  DO Kiev 
  [N.Gorbunov (D) 15 og, Nikolai Parshin 30] 
[Oct 29] 
TORPEDO Moskva               2-1  Dinamo Leningrad             [aet] 
  [Vitaliy Vatskevich 74, Yuriy Zolotov ? – Alexei Kolobov 56]

=== Final ===
2 November 1952

Torpedo Moscow	1 – 0	Spartak Moscow
Petrov 89'	[ Report]

Moscow
