= Victor Berco =

Moldovan footballer (born 1979)

Personal information
- Date of birth: 20 April 1979 (age 47)
- Place of birth: Bălţi, Moldavian SSR
- Height: 1.75 m (5 ft 9 in)
- Position: Forward

Senior career*
Years	Team	Apps	(Gls)
1995–1998	Olimpia Bălți	66	(28)
1998	Zimbru Chișinău	11	(3)
1999	Sturm Graz	10	(3)
1999–2002	Zimbru Chișinău	79	(28)
2002–2003	Shinnik Yaroslavl	23	(4)
2004–2005	Oryol	73	(12)
2006–2007	Almaty	43	(2)
2008	Volga Ulyanovsk	39	(3)
2009	Kaisar	12	(0)
2010	→Olimpia Bălți	8	(0)
2010	Zimbru Chișinău	18	(2)

International career
2001–2006	Moldova	16	(0)
- * Club domestic league appearances and goals

Victor Berco (born 20 April 1979) is a Moldovan former footballer.

== Football career ==
In July, 2002, he arrived Russia and signed a contract with Shinnik Yaroslavl of Premier League.

In April, 2004 he joined FC Oryol of First Division.

He then spent two seasons with Kazakhstani side Almaty before back to Russia for First Division newcomer Volga Ulyanovsk.

=== International career ===
He played the last official match for Moldova on 6 September 2006, a UEFA Euro 2008 qualifying, which he was sent off after being booked for a second time. In the whole Euro 2008 qualifying campaign, he played the first two games. He also the member of 2002 FIFA World Cup qualifying, and UEFA Euro 2004 qualifying. Berco has made 16 appearances for the national team.
