= FC Zimbru Chișinău =

Association football club in Moldova

Zimbru Chișinău
- Full name: Fotbal Club Zimbru Chișinău
- Nicknames: Galben-verzii (The Yellow-Greens); Zimbrii
- Founded: 16 May 1947; 79 years ago as Dinamo Chișinău
- Ground: Zimbru Stadium
- Capacity: 10,104
- Owner: Nicolae Ciornîi
- President: Andriy Semenchuk
- Head coach: Oleksandr Poklonskyi
- League: Liga
- 2025–26: Liga, 3rd of 8
- Website: zimbru.md
| Home colours | Away colours |

Fotbal Club Zimbru Chișinău, commonly known as Zimbru Chișinău or simply Zimbru, is a Moldovan professional association football club based in Chișinău, which competes in the Moldovan Liga, the highest tier of Moldovan football.

Founded in the Moldavian Soviet Socialist Republic in 1947, the club entered the Soviet Top League in 1956 and totalled eleven participations before their last relegation in 1983. The club remained the leader of Moldavian football during most of the Soviet period and was the only one that reached and played at the Soviet top tier. After the independence of Moldova in 1991, the team established itself as an early force in the country, winning all the first five national titles and eight of the first nine, but have not won since.

Zimbru play their home matches at the 10,104-seater Zimbru Stadium.

== History ==
Zimbru Chișinău was formed in 1947 in the Moldavian Soviet Socialist Republic (present day Moldova). 'Zimbru' is a Romanian word for European bison, but the club also previously functioned under names such as Dinamo, Burevestnik, Moldova, Avântul, and Nistru. The Soviet Era was spent mostly in Class B of the regional league until eventual promotion to Class A. The club then flitted between Class A and Class B as well as spending time in the Soviet Top League and First League. In total, Zimbru spent 11 seasons in the Top League between 1956 and 1983. Zimbru had their biggest success in 1956 when they finished in 6th place out of 12 in the Soviet Top League and in 1963 when they reached the quarter-finals of the Soviet Cup.
Zimbru's fortunes changed after the fall of the USSR and the establishment of the Republic of Moldova. The club won all five of the initial seasons of the Moldovan National League (1992–96), and apart from finishing as runners-up to Chișinău rivals Constructorul Chișinău in 1996–97, won eight of the first nine championships. Zimbru have also won the Moldovan Cup six times, including a double in 1997–98 and the Moldovan Super Cup once.

== Crest and colours ==
Since its foundation, Zimbru's colours always was yellow and green. Throughout history, Zimbru Chișinău had many logos. Traditional colours were always present on club crests.

== Stadium ==
FC Zimbru's home ground is Zimbru Stadium, a football-specific stadium in Botanica sector of Chișinău. It was opened in 2006. The stadium has a natural grass playing surface, and its capacity is 10,104.

== Rivalries ==
In the 1990s (the first decade of Moldova's independence), Zimbru's rival was Constructorul, the other team from Chișinău, until the club relocated to Cioburciu in 2001. Another rivalry was established in the mid-2000s when Dacia Chișinău, another team from Chișinău, became one of Moldova's top teams. However, Dacia Chișinău ceased to exist in 2018. The match between them was known as "The Derby of the capital" (Romanian: Derbiul capitalei). In 1997, a new team was founded in Tiraspol, Sheriff Tiraspol. In a few years, Sheriff was promoted to the top league and became a force in Moldovan football. Considering the strength of team and the tensions between Moldova and Transnistria, the match between Zimbru and Sheriff became a derby, the most important match in country. Thus, it has been named "Derby of Moldova", being labelled even as "Moldovan El Clasico" (Romanian: El Clasico de Moldova).

== Player of the year ==
Zimbru players who received the award Moldovan Footballer of the Year:

| Year | Winner |
|---|---|
| 1992 | (Moldova) Alexandru Spiridon |
| 1993 | (Moldova) Alexandru Curtianu |
| 1994 | (Moldova) Serghei Cleșcenco |
| 1995 | (Moldova) Ion Testemițanu |
| 1997 | (Moldova) Ion Testemițanu |
| 1999 | (Moldova) Sergiu Epureanu |
| 2002 | (Moldova) Boris Cebotari |

== Squad ==
As of 27 June 2026

Note: Flags indicate national team as defined under FIFA eligibility rules; some limited exceptions apply. Players may hold more than one non-FIFA nationality.

| No. | Pos. | Nation | Player |
|---|---|---|---|
| 1 | GK | MDA | Dan Rusu |
| 2 | DF | MDA | Ilie Negru |
| 3 | DF | MDA | Vladislav Boico |
| 4 | DF | MDA | Cristian Gonța |
| 5 | DF | BRA | Italo Dias |
| 6 | DF | BRA | Pedro Henrique |
| 7 | MF | BRA | Caio Dantas |
| 8 | MF | BRA | Matteo Amoroso |
| 9 | FW | NGR | Michael Ebikabowei |
| 10 | MF | MDA | Eugeniu Cociuc (captain) |
| 14 | MF | CUW | Rayvien Rosario |
| 16 | DF | MDA | Cristian Martin |
| 17 | MF | MDA | Tudor Butucel |
| 18 | DF | MDA | Alex Gutium |
| 19 | MF | MDA | Stelian Trifan |

| No. | Pos. | Nation | Player |
|---|---|---|---|
| 20 | MF | MDA | Vlad Răileanu |
| 22 | MF | SWE | Ahmed Bonnah |
| 23 | DF | BRA | Marcello Gesteira |
| 24 | MF | ARG | Thiago Ceijas |
| 27 | MF | UKR | Danylo Boiko |
| 30 | DF | MDA | Andrei Macrițchii |
| 35 | DF | BLR | Nikolai Zolotov |
| 44 | DF | MDA | Sergiu Ungureanu |
| 71 | MF | MDA | Macar Obrejan |
| 88 | GK | SRB | Ivan Dokić |
| 92 | GK | MDA | Cristian Sîrghi |
| 98 | MF | UKR | Maksym Lunyov |
| 99 | FW | MDA | Alexandru Bețivu |
| — | DF | PAN | Kevin Berkeley |
| — | FW | BRA | Luan Andrey |

== Honours ==
=== Moldova ===
- Moldovan Liga
  - Winners (8): 1992, 1992–93, 1993–94, 1994–95, 1995–96, 1997–98, 1998–99, 1999–2000
- Moldovan Cup
  - Winners (6): 1996–97, 1997–98, 2002–03, 2003–04, 2006–07, 2013–14
- Moldovan Super Cup
  - Winners (1): 2014

=== Soviet Union ===
- Soviet First League (level 2)
  - Winners (1): 1955
- Soviet Second League (level 3)
  - Winners (1): 1988

== League history ==
=== Table ===
| Season | Tier | Pos | Pld | W | D | L | GF | GA | Pts | Cup | Super Cup | Europe | | Top scorer (league) |
|---|---|---|---|---|---|---|---|---|---|---|---|---|---|---|
| 1992 | 1st | 1st | 22 | 15 | 5 | 2 | 40 | 15 | 35 | Quarter-finals | — | — | | (Moldova) Alexandru Spiridon (Moldova) Iurie Miterev – 8 |
| 1992–93 | 1st | 1st | 30 | 22 | 6 | 2 | 66 | 17 | 50 | Round of 16 | — | — | | (Moldova) Alexandru Spiridon – 12 |
| 1993–94 | 1st | 1st | 30 | 25 | 2 | 3 | 86 | 22 | 52 | Semi-finals | — | UCL | PR | (Moldova) Serghei Cleșcenco – 14 |
| 1994–95 | 1st | 1st | 26 | 21 | 4 | 1 | 69 | 10 | 67 | Runners-up | — | UC | PR | (Moldova) Serghei Cleșcenco – 11 |
| 1995–96 | 1st | 1st | 30 | 26 | 3 | 1 | 110 | 11 | 81 | Quarter-finals | — | UC | 2R | (Moldova) Vladislav Gavriliuc – 34 |
| 1996–97 | 1st | 2nd | 30 | 22 | 4 | 4 | 112 | 21 | 70 | Winners | — | UC | PR | (Moldova) Iurie Miterev – 34 |
| 1997–98 | 1st | 1st | 26 | 22 | 3 | 1 | 75 | 8 | 69 | Winners | — | UCWC | QR | (Moldova) Serghei Cleșcenco – 25 |
| 1998–99 | 1st | 1st | 26 | 18 | 7 | 1 | 43 | 9 | 61 | Quarter-finals | — | UCL | 1Q | (Moldova) Vladislav Gavriliuc – 10 |
| 1999–00 | 1st | 1st | 36 | 25 | 7 | 4 | 78 | 21 | 82 | Runners-up | — | UCL; UC | 3Q; 1R | (Moldova) Victor Berco – 15 |
| 2000–01 | 1st | 2nd | 28 | 20 | 6 | 2 | 46 | 15 | 66 | Semi-finals | — | UCL; UC | 3Q; 1R | (Moldova) Iurie Miterev – 8 |
| 2001–02 | 1st | 3rd | 28 | 12 | 10 | 6 | 52 | 20 | 46 | Semi-finals | — | UC | QR | (Moldova) Victor Berco – 12 |
| 2002–03 | 1st | 2nd | 24 | 15 | 5 | 4 | 47 | 20 | 50 | Winners | — | UC | 1R | (Uzbekistan) Vladimir Shishelov – 13 |
| 2003–04 | 1st | 3rd | 28 | 14 | 7 | 7 | 40 | 23 | 49 | Winners | Runners-up | UC | 1R | (Uzbekistan) Vladimir Shishelov – 15 |
| 2004–05 | 1st | 5th | 28 | 12 | 7 | 9 | 29 | 15 | 43 | Quarter-finals | Runners-up | — | | (Moldova) Sergiu Chirilov – 7 |
| 2005–06 | 1st | 2nd | 28 | 15 | 8 | 5 | 47 | 20 | 53 | Semi-finals | — | — | | (Moldova) Sergiu Chirilov – 11 |
| 2006–07 | 1st | 2nd | 36 | 21 | 8 | 7 | 63 | 23 | 71 | Winners | — | UC | 2Q | (Russia) Alexei Zhdanov – 14 |
| 2007–08 | 1st | 5th | 30 | 13 | 13 | 4 | 43 | 21 | 52 | Semi-finals | Runners-up | UC | 1Q | (Russia) Alexei Zhdanov – 12 |
| 2008–09 | 1st | 4th | 30 | 13 | 7 | 10 | 42 | 30 | 46 | Semi-finals | — | — | | (Moldova) Oleg Andronic – 16 |
| 2009–10 | 1st | 4th | 33 | 17 | 8 | 8 | 47 | 29 | 59 | Quarter-finals | — | UEL | 2Q | (Moldova) Andrei Secrieru – 7 |
| 2010–11 | 1st | 4th | 39 | 22 | 10 | 7 | 56 | 20 | 76 | Round of 16 | — | — | | (Moldova) Oleg Andronic – 9 |
| 2011–12 | 1st | 3rd | 33 | 17 | 10 | 6 | 47 | 24 | 61 | Quarter-finals | — | — | | (Moldova) Oleg Molla – 14 |
| 2012–13 | 1st | 6th | 33 | 12 | 10 | 11 | 53 | 38 | 46 | Quarter-finals | — | UEL | 2Q | (Moldova) Oleg Molla – 7 |
| 2013–14 | 1st | 4th | 33 | 18 | 7 | 8 | 56 | 24 | 61 | Winners | — | — | | (Russia) Sergey Tsyganov – 13 |
| 2014–15 | 1st | 6th | 24 | 7 | 6 | 11 | 23 | 19 | 27 | Quarter-finals | Winners | UEL | PO | (Moldova) Alexandru Dedov – 4 |
| 2015–16 | 1st | 3rd | 27 | 15 | 4 | 8 | 42 | 26 | 49 | Quarter-finals | — | — | | (Portugal) Rui Miguel – 9 |
| 2016–17 | 1st | 5th | 30 | 13 | 7 | 10 | 32 | 29 | 46 | Semi-finals | — | UEL | 2Q | (Portugal) Hugo Neto – 6 |
| 2017 | 1st | 8th | 18 | 5 | 4 | 9 | 17 | 21 | 19 | Runners-up | — | — | | (Brazil) Jean Theodoro – 5 |
| 2018 | 1st | 5th | 28 | 9 | 9 | 10 | 28 | 37 | 36 | Semi-finals | — | — | | (Moldova) Ilie Damașcan (Moldova) Ion Nicolaescu – 5 |
| 2019 | 1st | 7th | 28 | 3 | 7 | 18 | 16 | 43 | 16 | Quarter-finals | — | — | | (Moldova) Dan Pîslă – 5 |
| 2020–21 | 1st | 8th | 36 | 6 | 7 | 23 | 39 | 63 | 25 | Round of 16 | — | — | | (Moldova) Artur Pătraș – 10 |
| 2021–22 | 1st | 7th | 28 | 7 | 6 | 15 | 32 | 46 | 27 | Quarter-finals | — | — | | (Moldova) Eugen Sidorenco – 5 |
| 2022–23 | 1st | 3rd | 24 | 7 | 10 | 7 | 27 | 26 | 31 | Quarter-finals | — | — | | (Moldova) Alexandru Dedov – 8 |
| 2023–24 | 1st | 3rd | 24 | 13 | 3 | 8 | 33 | 23 | 42 | Runners-up | — | UECL | 2Q | (Cape Verde) João Paulino (Nigeria) Emmanuel Alaribe – 7 |
| 2024–25 | 1st | 3rd | 24 | 14 | 3 | 7 | 54 | 25 | 45 | Semi-finals | — | UECL | 2Q | (Nigeria) Justice Ohajunwa (Moldova) Vlad Răileanu – 8 |
| 2025–26 | 1st | 3rd | 31 | 18 | 8 | 5 | 70 | 32 | 62 | Runners-up | — | UECL | 2Q | (Belarus) Dzianis Kazlouski – 20 |

== European record ==
| Season | Competition | Round | Club | Home | Away | Aggregate |
|---|---|---|---|---|---|---|
| 1993–94 | UEFA Champions League | PR | (Israel) Beitar Jerusalem | 1–1 | 0–2 | 1–3 |
| 1994–95 | UEFA Cup | PR | (Hungary) Kispest Honvéd | 0–1 | 1–4 | 1–5 |
| 1995–96 | UEFA Cup | PR | (Israel) Hapoel Tel Aviv | 2–0 | 0–0 | 2–0 |
| 1995–96 | UEFA Cup | 1R | (Latvia) RAF Jelgava | 1–0 | 2–1 | 3–1 |
| 1995–96 | UEFA Cup | 2R | (Czech Republic) Sparta Prague | 0–2 | 3–4 | 3–6 |
| 1996–97 | UEFA Cup | PR | (Croatia) Hajduk Split | 0–4 | 1–2 | 1–6 |
| 1997–98 | UEFA Cup Winners' Cup | QR | (Ukraine) Shakhtar Donetsk | 1–1 | 0–3 | 1–4 |
| 1998–99 | UEFA Champions League | 1Q | (Hungary) Újpest | 1–0 | 1–3 | 2–3 |
| 1999–00 | UEFA Champions League | 1Q | (Republic of Ireland) St Patrick's Athletic | 5–0 | 5–0 | 10–0 |
| 1999–00 | UEFA Champions League | 2Q | (Georgia (country)) Dinamo Tbilisi | 2–0 | 1–2 | 3–2 |
| 1999–00 | UEFA Champions League | 3Q | (Netherlands) PSV Eindhoven | 0–0 | 0–2 | 0–2 |
| 1999–00 | UEFA Cup | 1R | (England) Tottenham Hotspur | 0–0 | 0–3 | 0–3 |
| 2000–01 | UEFA Champions League | 1Q | (Albania) Tirana | 3–2 | 3–2 | 6–4 |
| 2000–01 | UEFA Champions League | 2Q | (Slovenia) Maribor | 2–0 | 0–1 | 2–1 |
| 2000–01 | UEFA Champions League | 3Q | (Czech Republic) Sparta Prague | 0–1 | 0–1 | 0–2 |
| 2000–01 | UEFA Cup | 1R | (Germany) Hertha Berlin | 1–2 | 0–2 | 1–4 |
| 2001–02 | UEFA Cup | QR | (Turkey) Gaziantepspor | 0–0 | 1–4 | 1–4 |
| 2002–03 | UEFA Cup | QR | (Sweden) Göteborg | 3–1 | 2–2 | 5–3 |
| 2002–03 | UEFA Cup | 1R | (Spain) Real Betis | 0–2 | 1–2 | 1–4 |
| 2003–04 | UEFA Cup | QR | (Bulgaria) Litex Lovech | 2–0 | 0–0 | 2–0 |
| 2003–04 | UEFA Cup | 1R | (Greece) Aris | 1–1 | 1–2 | 2–3 |
| 2006–07 | UEFA Cup | 1Q | (Azerbaijan) Qarabağ | 1–1 | 2–1 (a.e.t) | 3–2 |
| 2006–07 | UEFA Cup | 2Q | (Ukraine) Metalurh Zaporizhya | 0–0 | 0–3 | 0–3 |
| 2007–08 | UEFA Cup | 1Q | (Slovakia) Artmedia Petržalka | 2–2 | 1–1 | 3–3 (a) |
| 2009–10 | UEFA Europa League | 1Q | (Kazakhstan) Okzhetpes | 1–2 | 2–0 | 3–2 |
| 2009–10 | UEFA Europa League | 2Q | (Portugal) Paços de Ferreira | 0–0 | 0–1 | 0–1 |
| 2012–13 | UEFA Europa League | 1Q | (Wales) Bangor City | 2–1 | 0–0 | 2–1 |
| 2012–13 | UEFA Europa League | 2Q | (Switzerland) Young Boys | 1–0 (a.e.t) | 0–1 | 1–1 (1–4 p) |
| 2014–15 | UEFA Europa League | 1Q | (North Macedonia) Shkëndija | 2–0 | 1–2 | 3–2 |
| 2014–15 | UEFA Europa League | 2Q | (Bulgaria) CSKA Sofia | 0–0 | 1–1 | 1–1 (a) |
| 2014–15 | UEFA Europa League | 3Q | (Austria) Grödig | 0–1 | 2–1 | 2–2 (a) |
| 2014–15 | UEFA Europa League | PO | (Greece) PAOK | 1–0 | 0–4 | 1–4 |
| 2016–17 | UEFA Europa League | 1Q | (Georgia (country)) Chikhura Sachkhere | 0–1 | 3–2 | 3–3 (a) |
| 2016–17 | UEFA Europa League | 2Q | (Turkey) Osmanlıspor | 2–2 | 0–5 | 2–7 |
| 2023–24 | UEFA Europa Conference League | 1Q | (San Marino) La Fiorita | 1–0 | 1–1 | 2–1 |
| 2023–24 | UEFA Europa Conference League | 2Q | (Turkey) Fenerbahçe | 0–4 | 0–5 | 0–9 |
| 2024–25 | UEFA Conference League | 2Q | Ararat-Armenia | 0–3 | 1–3 | 1–6 |
| 2025–26 | UEFA Conference League | 2Q | (Kazakhstan) Astana | 0–2 | 1–1 | 1–3 |
| 2026–27 | UEFA Conference League | 2Q | (Armenia) Noah | 1–1 | 1–2 | 2–3 |

== Club officials ==
=== Technical staff ===
As of 27 June 2026

| Role | Name |
|---|---|
| Head coach | (Ukraine) Oleksandr Poklonskyi |
| Assistant coach | (Ukraine) Oleksandr Alimov |
| Assistant coach | (Moldova) Gheorghe Codița |
| Goalkeeping coach | (Ukraine) Serhii Yakovets |
| Fitness coach | (Moldova) Tudor Iapără |
| Physiotherapist | (Moldova) Andrei Varvarici |
| Coach analyst | (Ukraine) Oleksii Bilorukavyi |
| Masseur | (Moldova) Petru Caraman |
| Club doctor | (Moldova) Ivan Țînpeu |
| Administrator | (Moldova) Sergiu Buga |

=== Club management ===
As of 27 June 2026

| Role | Name |
|---|---|
| Owner | (Moldova) Nicolae Ciornîi |
| President | (Ukraine) Andriy Semenchuk |
| Head of football operations | (Moldova) Emil Pisarenco |
| General director | (Moldova) Sergiu Topor |
| Sporting director | (Moldova) Alexei Popa |
| Technical director | (Moldova) Oleg Istrati |
| Community officer | (Moldova) Ion Jalbă |
| Press officer | (Ukraine) Galina Tretyak |
