= 2010–11 Moldovan National Division =

Moldovan National Division
- Season: 2010–11
- Champions: Dacia Chişinău
- Relegated: Gagauziya; Dinamo Bender
- Champions League: Dacia Chişinău
- Europa League: Sheriff Tiraspol; Milsami Orhei; Iskra-Stal
- Matches: 273
- Goals: 684 (2.51 per match)
- Top goalscorer: Gheorghe Boghiu (26 goals)
- Biggest home win: Dacia 7–0 Sf. Gheorghe; Tiraspol 7–0 Dinamo
- Biggest away win: Dinamo 0–8 Olimpia
- Highest scoring: Gagauziya 5–4 Dinamo; Milsami 7–2 Dinamo

The 2010–11 Moldovan National Division (Romanian: Divizia Naţională) was the 20th season of top-tier football in Moldova. Sheriff Tiraspol were the defending champions, having won their tenth Moldovan championship, all consecutively, the previous season. The competition began on 24 July 2010.

== Teams ==
FC Costuleni and CF Gagauziya were promoted from the Moldovan "A" Division as champions and runners-up, respectively, to the National Division. None of the teams competing in the 2009–10 season were relegated, leaving 14 teams to contest the league, with one relegation place for the team finishing bottom.

=== Stadia and locations ===
Location of teams in National Division 2010–11

Club	Location	Stadium	Capacity
Academia UTM Chişinău	Chişinău	Dinamo Stadium (Chişinău)	2,888
Costuleni	Costuleni	CSR Orhei	2,539
CSCA–Rapid Chişinău	Ghidighici	Ghidighici Stadium	1,500
Dacia Chişinău	Chişinău	Dinamo Stadium (Chişinău)	2,692
Dinamo Bender	Bender	Dinamo Stadium (Bender)	5,061
Iskra-Stal Rîbnița	Rîbnița	Orăşenesc Stadium	2,000
Gagauziya Comrat	Comrat	Suruceni Stadium	2,000
Milsami Orhei	Orhei	CSR Orhei	2,539
Nistru Otaci	Otaci	Călărăseuca Stadium	2,000
Olimpia Bălţi	Bălţi	Olimpia Bălţi Stadium	5,953
Sfîntul Gheorghe Suruceni	Suruceni	Suruceni Stadium	2,000
Sheriff Tiraspol	Tiraspol	Sheriff Stadium	13,460
FC Tiraspol	Tiraspol	Sheriff Stadium	13,460
Zimbru Chişinău	Chişinău	Zimbru Stadium	10,600

=== Managers and captains ===
Club	Coach	Captain	Replaced coach(es)
Academia UTM	(Moldova) Alexandru Cojuhari	(Moldova) Eugeniu Gorceac	(Russia) Igor Dobrovolski
Costuleni	(Moldova) Ruslan Barburoş	(Moldova) Denis Orbu	(Moldova) Ilie Vieru
CSCA-Rapid	(Moldova) Serghei Sârbu		
Dacia	(Russia) Igor Dobrovolski	(Moldova) Ghenadie Orbu	(Moldova) Veaceslav Semionov
Dinamo	(Moldova) Iuri Hodichin	(Moldova) Pavel Martînenco	
Gagauziya	(Moldova) Serghei Botnaraş		
Iskra-Stal	(Moldova) Vlad Goian	(Moldova) Andrei Burcovski	
Milsami	(Romania) Ştefan Stoica		(Moldova) Vladimir Gherasimov
Nistru	(Moldova) Lilian Popescu	(Moldova) Dumitri Dolgov	
Olimpia	(Moldova) Nicolai Bunea		
Sfîntul Gheorghe	(Moldova) Sergiu Caraman		
Sheriff	(Belarus) Vitali Rashkevich	(Georgia (country)) Vazha Tarkhnishvili	(Belarus) Andrei Sasnitski
Tiraspol	(Moldova) Yuri Blonar		
Zimbru	(Moldova) Ivan Tabanov	(Moldova) Victor Berco	

== League table ==
Pos	Team	Pld	W	D	L	GF	GA	GD	Pts	Qualification or relegation
1	Dacia Chișinău (C)	39	27	11	1	66	16	+50	92	Qualification for the Champions League second qualifying round
2	Sheriff Tiraspol	39	24	11	4	81	16	+65	83	Qualification for the Europa League second qualifying round
3	Milsami Orhei	39	23	9	7	71	23	+48	78	Qualification for the Europa League first qualifying round
4	Zimbru Chișinău	39	22	10	7	56	20	+36	76	
5	Iskra - Stal Rîbnița	39	21	11	7	62	26	+36	74 (Note: ISK: 4 pts, +0 gl; OLI: 4 pts, +0 gl)	Qualification for the Europa League second qualifying round (Note: As winners of the 2010–11 Moldovan Cup.)
6	Olimpia Bălți	39	21	11	7	59	31	+28	74	
7	Tiraspol	39	17	6	16	57	45	+12	57	
8	CSCA – Rapid Chişinău	39	15	10	14	39	37	+2	55	
9	Academia Chișinău	39	14	10	15	44	37	+7	52	
10	Costuleni	39	7	6	26	23	68	−45	27	
11	Nistru Otaci	39	7	4	28	33	75	−42	25 (Note: NIS: 4 pts, +0 gl; SFÎ: 4 pts, +0 gl)	
12	Sfîntul Gheorghe	39	6	7	26	30	83	−53	25	
13	Gagauziya Comrat (R)	39	7	2	30	38	89	−51	23	Relegation to Division "A" (Note: CF Gagauziya could not obtain a licence for participating in Moldovan National Division next season.)
14	Dinamo Bendery (R)	39	6	4	29	25	118	−93	22	Relegation to Division "A"

Source: Moldovan Football Federation (in Romanian)
Rules for classification: 1st points; 2nd goal difference
For determining final classification: 1st points; 2nd head-to-head points; 3rd head-to-head goal difference; 4th goal difference; 5th number of goals scored; 6th number of wins; 7th Fair Play competition
(C) Champions; (R) Relegated

=== Round by round ===
Team ╲ Round	1	2	3	4	5	6	7	8	9	10	11	12	13	14	15	16	17	18	19	20	21	22	23	24	25	26	27	28	29	30	31	32	33	34	35	36	37	38	39
Dacia Chișinău	3	1	3	5	2	3	2	2	2	2	3	2	2	2	1	1	3	2	2	2	1	1	1	1	1	1	1	1	2	2	1	1	1	1	1	1	1	1	1
Sheriff Tiraspol	1	4	2	4	6	6	6	5	7	6	5	4	3	3	3	4	1	4	5	3	3	2	3	2	2	2	2	2	1	1	2	2	2	2	2	2	2	2	2
Milsami Orhei	4	2	5	2	3	4	4	3	4	4	4	5	5	5	5	5	5	1	1	1	2	3	2	3	3	3	3	3	5	5	5	3	3	5	3	3	3	3	3
Zimbru Chișinău	2	5	7	9	7	7	7	7	5	5	6	7	6	6	6	6	6	6	6	6	6	6	6	6	6	6	6	6	6	6	6	6	4	3	4	5	5	4	4
Iskra - Stal Rîbnița	3	3	4	3	4	2	1	1	1	1	1	1	4	4	4	3	2	5	4	5	5	4	4	4	4	5	4	4	4	3	3	4	5	6	6	6	6	5	5
Olimpia Bălți	3	6	1	1	1	1	3	4	3	3	2	3	1	1	2	2	4	3	3	4	4	5	5	5	5	4	5	5	3	4	4	5	6	4	5	4	4	6	6
Tiraspol	13	7	10	7	9	9	10	9	9	9	9	9	9	9	9	9	9	9	9	9	9	9	9	9	8	9	9	9	9	9	9	8	8	8	8	8	8	7	7
CSCA – Rapid Chişinău	8	12	9	10	10	10	8	8	8	8	8	8	7	7	8	8	8	8	8	8	7	8	7	7	7	7	7	7	7	7	7	7	7	7	7	7	7	8	8
Academia Chișinău	8	8	8	6	5	5	5	6	6	7	7	6	8	8	7	7	7	7	7	7	8	7	8	8	9	8	8	8	8	8	8	9	9	9	9	9	9	9	9
Costuleni	5	9	6	8	8	8	9	10	10	10	10	11	13	13	13	11	10	10	11	11	10	10	11	11	11	11	10	10	10	10	10	10	10	11	10	10	10	10	10
Nistru Otaci	8	11	13	14	14	12	12	13	12	11	11	13	12	10	10	10	12	12	12	12	12	13	13	14	12	12	12	12	11	12	12	11	11	10	11	11	11	11	11
Sfîntul Gheorghe	13	14	12	13	12	13	13	11	11	12	13	14	14	14	14	14	14	14	13	13	13	14	14	12	13	14	14	14	14	14	14	13	13	12	13	12	12	13	12
Gagauziya Comrat	8	10	11	12	13	14	14	14	13	13	14	12	11	12	12	13	13	13	14	14	14	12	12	13	14	13	13	13	13	13	13	14	14	14	14	14	14	12	13
Dinamo Bendery	8	13	14	11	11	11	11	12	14	14	12	10	10	11	11	12	11	11	10	10	11	11	10	10	10	10	11	11	12	11	11	12	12	13	12	13	13	14	14

Source: kicker (in German)
= Leader; = 2nd place; = 3rd place; = Relegation

== Results ==
The schedule consists of three rounds. During the first two rounds, each team plays each other once home and away for a total of 26 matches. The pairings of the third round will then be set according to the standings after the first two rounds, giving every team a third game against each opponent for a total of 39 games per team.

=== First and second round ===
Home \ Away	ACA	CRC	COS	DAC	DIN	GAG	ISK	MIL	NIS	OLI	SFÎ	SHE	TIR	ZIM
Academia Chișinău		0–0	0–1	0–0	1–1	3–0	0–0	1–0	1–0	0–1	2–0	1–0	3–0	0–1
CSCA – Rapid Chişinău	2–0		1–0	0–2	2–0	2–1	0–0	0–1	1–0	1–1	2–0	1–1	2–0	0–0
Costuleni	1–5	1–2		1–2	0–0	2–1	1–3	0–7	2–1	0–1	0–3	0–0	1–2	0–2
Dacia Chișinău	3–1	1–0	3–1		5–0	1–0	0–0	0–0	1–1	3–1	7–0	0–0	2–0	1–1
Dinamo Bendery	1–5	0–1	1–0	0–2		0–4	0–1	0–3	3–2	0–8	0–2	0–7	0–3	1–0
Gagauziya Comrat	0–3	1–2	0–3	1–4	5–4		0–4	0–2	5–1	1–2	2–1	0–4	1–3	0–0
Iskra - Stal Rîbnița	0–0	1–0	5–0	1–2	4–0	1–0		0–1	1–1	0–0	4–0	0–1	4–2	2–1
Milsami Orhei	1–1	3–0	2–0	1–2	1–1	2–1	0–0		5–0	0–0	2–1	0–1	5–1	1–0
Nistru Otaci	0–1	0–4	1–0	1–1	0–2	3–0	0–1	0–1		0–2	1–0	0–3	4–2	1–5
Olimpia Bălți	3–2	3–0	4–1	1–2	1–0	1–0	0–1	0–0	1–0		4–1	0–0	0–4	1–1
Sfîntul Gheorghe	1–1	0–0	1–2	0–2	1–2	2–2	2–2	0–4	2–1	0–2		1–1	0–2	0–3
Sheriff Tiraspol	1–1	4–0	1–1	3–0	2–0	3–0	1–0	2–0	1–0	1–1	4–0		3–0	1–0
Tiraspol	2–1	1–0	3–0	0–0	4–1	5–0	0–0	1–2	4–0	1–3	1–0	0–3		0–2
Zimbru Chișinău	1–0	0–0	1–0	0–1	6–1	1–0	0–1	0–0	2–0	0–0	2–1	1–1	1–0	

Source: Moldovan Football Federation (in Romanian)
Legend: Blue = home team win; Yellow = draw; Red = away team win.

=== Third round ===
Key numbers for pairing determination (number marks position after 26 games):

27th round	28th round	29th round	30th round	31st round	32nd round	33rd round
1 – 14	14 – 8	2 – 14	14 – 9	3 – 14	14 – 10	4 – 14
2 – 13	9 – 7	3 – 1	10 – 8	4 – 2	11 – 9	5 – 3
3 – 12	10 – 6	4 – 13	11 – 7	5 – 1	12 – 8	6 – 2
4 – 11	11 – 5	5 – 12	12 – 6	6 – 13	13 – 7	7 – 1
5 – 10	12 – 4	6 – 11	13 – 5	7 – 12	1 – 6	8 – 13
6 – 9	13 – 3	7 – 10	1 – 4	8 – 11	2 – 5	9 – 12
7 – 8	1 – 2	8 – 9	2 – 3	9 – 10	3 – 4	10 – 11

34th round	35th round	36th round	37th round	38th round	39th round
14 – 11	5 – 14	14 – 12	6 – 14	14 – 13	7 – 14
12 – 10	6 – 4	13 – 11	7 – 5	1 – 12	8 – 6
13 – 9	7 – 3	1 – 10	8 – 4	2 – 11	9 – 5
1 – 8	8 – 2	2 – 9	9 – 3	3 – 10	10 – 4
2 – 7	9 – 1	3 – 8	10 – 2	4 – 9	11 – 3
3 – 6	10 – 13	4 – 7	11 – 1	5 – 8	12 – 2
4 – 5	11 – 12	5 – 6	12 – 13	6 – 7	13 – 1

Home \ Away	ACA	CRC	COS	DAC	DIN	GAG	ISK	MIL	NIS	OLI	SFÎ	SHE	TIR	ZIM
Academia Chișinău			1–0			1–0				0–2		1–0	1–1	0–2
CSCA – Rapid Chişinău	4–2			0–0	2–0		1–2	0–1	3–2		1–3			
Costuleni		0–0		0–1			0–1	0–3	2–0				0–0	
Dacia Chișinău	2–0				3–1				2–0	2–0	3–0	1–1		1–0
Dinamo Bendery	1–1		0–1			1–0				0–2		0–7		1–6
Gagauziya Comrat		1–3	2–1	0–2			0–3	0–3					1–2	
Iskra - Stal Rîbnița	3–2			0–1	6–1			2–2	2–1		3–1			0–0
Milsami Orhei	1–0			0–0	7–2				1–2	2–1	4–0			1–2
Nistru Otaci	1–0				4–0	1–2				0–3		1–3		2–4
Olimpia Bălți		2–1	0–0			4–2	2–1				1–1	1–0	0–3	
Sfîntul Gheorghe	0–2		2–0		2–0	1–3			1–1				0–1	
Sheriff Tiraspol		2–1	4–0			5–1	2–1	2–1			6–0		0–0	
Tiraspol		0–0		0–1	7–0		1–2	0–1	1–0					
Zimbru Chișinău		1–0	2–1			3–1				0–0	3–0	1–0	1–0	

Source: Moldovan Football Federation (in Romanian)
Legend: Blue = home team win; Yellow = draw; Red = away team win.

== Top goalscorers ==
Including matches played on 22 May 2011; Source: Soccerway

Rank	Player	Club	Goals
1	(Moldova) Gheorghe Boghiu	Milsami Orhei	26
2	(Moldova) Ghenadie Orbu	Dacia Chişinău	21
3	(Moldova) Mahai Cojusea	Gagauziya Comrat	19
4	(Moldova) Alexandru Popovici	Iskra-Stal Rîbnița	16
5	(Georgia (country)) Levan Korgalidze	Dacia Chişinău	13
5	(Senegal) Amath Diedhiou	Sheriff Tiraspol	13
7	(Moldova) Radu Gînsari	Academia UTM Chişinău	12
7	(Ukraine) Volodymyr Kilikevych	Iskra-Stal Rîbnița	12
8	(Latvia) Edgars Gauračs	Sheriff Tiraspol	10
9	(Moldova) Oleg Andronic	Zimbru Chişinău	9
9	(Russia) Daniil Nikolaev	Academia UTM Chişinău	9
9	(Moldova) Gheorghe Ovseannicov	Olimpia Bălţi	9
9	(Ukraine) Oleksandr Suchu	Iskra-Stal Rîbnița	9

8 goals (4 players)

- (Nigeria) Julius Adaramola (FC Olimpia Bălţi)
- (Romania) Adrian Grigoruță (FC Milsami)
- (Brazil) Ademar Xavier (FC Milsami)
- (Moldova) Dmitri Vornişel (FC Tiraspol)

7 goals (2 players)

- (Moldova) Sergiu Gheorghiev (FC Sheriff Tiraspol)
- (Moldova) Eduard Tomaşcov (FC Costuleni)

6 goals (10 players)

- (Burkina Faso) Wilfried Benjamin Balima (FC Sheriff Tiraspol)
- (Russia) Aleksandr Yerokhin (FC Sheriff Tiraspol)
- (Moldova) Eugen Gorodeţchi (FC Iskra-Stal Rîbnița)
- (Moldova) Stanislav Luca (Rapid Ghidighici)
- (Moldova) Renat Murguleţ (FC Nistru Otaci)
- (Moldova) Gheorghe Nicologlo (FC Tiraspol)
- (Moldova) Eugen Sidorenco (FC Zimbru Chişinău)
- (Moldova) Andrei Tcaciuc (FC Olimpia)
- (Moldova) Mihai Ţurcan (FC Zimbru Chişinău)
- (Moldova) Sergiu Zacon (FC Tighina)

5 goals (16 players)

- (Moldova) Maxim Antoniuc (FC Zimbru Chişinău)
- (Brazil) Jymmy Dougllas França (FC Sheriff Tiraspol)
- (Moldova) Maxim Franțuz (Rapid Ghidighici)
- (Georgia (country)) Davit Gamezardashvili (FC Dacia Chişinău)
- (Moldova) Alexandru Golban (FC Milsami)
- (Haiti) Jean-Robens Jerome (FC Olimpia)
- (Russia) Giga Mamulashvili (FC Tiraspol)
- (Moldova) Maxim Mihaliov (FC Dacia Chişinău)
- (Moldova) Andrei Novicov (FC Iskra-Stal Rîbnița)
- (Nigeria) Christopher Omoseibi (FC Tiraspol)
- (Moldova) Mihail Paseciniuc (FC Olimpia)
- (Serbia) Aleksandar Pešić (FC Sheriff Tiraspol)
- (Moldova) Aleksey Procopiev (FC Tighina)
- (Moldova) Oleg Şişchin (FC Zimbru Chişinău)
- (Moldova) Adrian Sosnovschi (FC Milsami)
- (Romania) Claudiu Octavian Vâlcu (FC Nistru Otaci)

4 goals (13 players)

- (Moldova) Andrei Bugneac (Rapid Ghidighici)
- (Romania) Adrian Caragea (FC Tiraspol)
- (Moldova) Anatol Cheptine (FC Sheriff Tiraspol)
- (Moldova) Valentin Furdui (FC Milsami)
- (Moldova) Sergiu Grițuc (FC Nistru Otaci)
- (Moldova) Oleg Hromţov (CF Gagauziya)
- (Moldova) Alexandru Maxim (Rapid Ghidighici)
- (Moldova) Petru Ojog (FC Sfîntul Gheorghe)
- (Moldova) Marcel Reşitca (FC Costuleni)
- (Ghana) Razak Salifu (FC Zimbru)
- (Slovenia) Dalibor Volaš (FC Sheriff Tiraspol)
- (Montenegro) Vladimir Volkov (FC Sheriff Tiraspol)
- (Russia) Nail Zamaliyev (FC Sheriff Tiraspol)

3 goals (30 players)

- (Ukraine) Igor Bridnea (FC Tiraspol)
- (Moldova) Andrei Burcovschi (FC Iskra-Stal Rîbnița)
- (Moldova) Denis Calincov (Rapid Ghidighici)
- (Moldova) Ion Demerji (FC Zimbru Chişinău)
- (Spain) Caio Suguino (FC Milsami)
- (Moldova) Eugen Golubovschi (FC Tighina)
- (Moldova) Alexandru A. Grosu (Rapid Ghidighici)
- (Moldova) Eduard Hoderean (FC Tiraspol)
- (Romania) Claudiu Ionescu (FC Milsami)
- (Moldova) Sergiu Jăpălău (Rapid Ghidighici)
- (Ukraine) Dmytro Kryvyy (FC Sfîntul Gheorghe)
- (Moldova) Petru Leucă (FC Academia Chişinău)
- (Ukraine) Igor Maliarenco (FC Nistru Otaci)
- (Moldova) Oleg Molla (FC Dacia Chişinău))
- (Nigeria) Jude Ogada (FC Olimpia)
- (Moldova) Ghenadie Olexici (FC Milsami)
- (Moldova) Nicolae Orlovschi (FC Olimpia)
- (Moldova) Alexandr Paşcenco (Rapid Ghidighici)
- (Moldova) Veaceslav Posmac (FC Sfîntul Gheorghe)
- (Moldova) Vladimir Potlog (FC Academia Chişinău)
- (Moldova) Andrei Prepeliţă (FC Sfîntul Gheorghe)
- (Russia) German Pyatnikov (FC Sfîntul Gheorghe)
- (Moldova) Alexandru Răilean (FC Sfîntul Gheorghe)
- (Moldova) Nicolae Rudac (FC Iskra-Stal Rîbnița)
- (Moldova) Eugen Slivca (FC Academia Chişinău)
- (Nigeria) Oluwaunmi Somide (FC Olimpia)
- (Moldova) Marian Stoleru (CF Gagauziya)
- (Moldova) Eugen Ţiverenco (FC Tighina)
- (Moldova) Andrei Vrabie (FC Costuleni)
- (Ukraine) Vitalii Yezhov (FC Tiraspol)

2 goals (39 players)

- (Romania) Ilie Bălaşa (FC Zimbru Chişinău)
- (Kazakhstan) Victor Berco (FC Zimbru Chişinău)
- (Russia) Artem Bludnov (FC Academia Chişinău)
- (Serbia) Vladimir Branković (FC Sheriff Tiraspol)
- (Moldova) Vitalie Bulat (FC Iskra-Stal)
- (Ukraine) Andrey Burdian (FC Zimbru Chişinău)
- (United States) Christian Camacho (FC Sfîntul Gheorghe)
- (Moldova) Adrian Caşcaval (FC Academia Chişinău)
- (Moldova) Denis Ciobanu (FC Tighina)
- (Moldova) Sergiu Ciuico (FC Costuleni)
- (Moldova) Valeriu Ciupercă (FC Academia Chişinău)
- (Moldova) Andrei Custurov (CF Gagauziya)
- (Brazil) Fred Nélson de Olivera (FC Tiraspol)
- (Moldova) Dumitru Dolgov (FC Nistru Otaci)
- (Moldova) Vladimir Dragovozov (FC Dacia Chişinău)
- (Georgia (country)) Vasil Ghutchashvili (FC Zimbru Chişinău)
- (Moldova) Eugen Gorceac (FC Dacia Chişinău)
- (Moldova) Sergiu Gusacov (FC Olimpia)
- (Moldova) Serghei Epureanu (FC Nistru Otaci)
- (Russia) Ruslan Kartoev (CF Gagauziya)
- (Ukraine) Yuriy Komyagin (FC Zimbru Chişinău)
- (Guinea) Thomas Kourouma (FC Olimpia)
- (Belarus) Vitaly Ledenev (FC Dacia Chişinău)
- (Moldova) Andrei Marina (FC Academia Chişinău)
- (Ghana) Nurudeen Mohammed (FC Milsami)
- (Moldova) Alexandru Onica (FC Dacia Chişinău)
- (Russia) Mihail Plătică (FC Sfîntul Gheorghe)
- (Moldova) Andrei Porfireanu (FC Iskra-Stal)
- (Moldova) Maxim Potîrniche (FC Academia Chişinău)
- (Moldova) Maxim Repinețchi (FC Olimpia)
- (Romania) Marius Robert Roman (FC Milsami)
- (Ghana) Eric Sackey (FC Dacia Chişinău)
- (Slovenia) Miral Samardžić (FC Sheriff Tiraspol)
- (Ukraine) Sandro Shugladze (FC Iskra-Stal)
- (Georgia (country)) Vazha Tarkhnishvili (FC Sheriff Tiraspol)
- (Moldova) Alexandru Tcaciuc (FC Nistru Otaci)
- (Moldova) Andrei Verbeţchi (FC Tiraspol)
- (Moldova) Alexandru Zislis (CF Gagauziya)

1 goals (87 players)

- (Serbia) Miloš Adamović (FC Sheriff Tiraspol)
- (Moldova) Stanislav Agafonov (FC Tighina)
- (Moldova) Ion Arabadji (Rapid Ghidighici)
- (Moldova) Ruslan Barburoş (FC Costuleni)
- (Cameroon) Titi Belle (FC Nistru Otaci)
- (Moldova) Iurii Bondarciuc (FC Tiraspol)
- (Moldova) Victor Bulat (FC Dacia Chişinău)
- (Moldova) Ştefan Burghiu (FC Nistru)
- (Moldova) Iulian Bursuc (FC Dacia Chişinău)
- (Moldova) Dumitru Chiriloae (FC Sfîntul Gheorghe)
- (Moldova) Sergiu Cojocari (FC Zimbru Chişinău)
- (Nigeria) Baba Collins (FC Dacia Chişinău)
- (Moldova) Andrei Corneencov (FC Tiraspol)
- (Moldova) Andrian Cucovei (FC Milsami)
- (Moldova) Sergiu Cuznețov (FC Academia Chişinău)
- (Moldova) Alexandru Dedov (FC Dacia Chişinău)
- (Moldova) Sergiu Diulgher (FC Tiraspol)
- (Moldova) Alexei Dîzov (FC Tighina)
- (Romania) Lucian Dobre (FC Iskra-Stal)
- (Moldova) Sergiu Dubac (FC Costuleni)
- (Romania) Valerian Gârlă (FC Milsami)
- (Moldova) Alexandru S. Grosu (Rapid Ghidighici)
- (Armenia) Artem Khachaturov (FC Sheriff Tiraspol)
- (Moldova) Maxim Hovanschi (FC Olimpia)
- (Moldova) Petru Hvorosteanov (FC Zimbru Chişinău)
- (Moldova) Oleg Ichim (FC Tighina)
- (Moldova) Daniel Indoitu (FC Academia Chişinău)
- (Moldova) Maxim Iurcu (FC Sheriff Tiraspol)
- (Moldova) Ion Jardan (Rapid Ghidighici)
- (Moldova) Alexei Josan (FC Costuleni)
- (Georgia (country)) Davit Kakulia (FC Sfîntul Gheorghe)
- (Ghana) Ghandy Kassanu (FC Sheriff Tiraspol)
- (Ukraine) Evgeny Khorolskyy (FC Olimpia)
- (Ukraine) Anton Kovalevsky (FC Zimbru Chişinău)
- (Russia) Denis Kravtsov (FC Sfîntul Gheorghe)
- (Russia) Igor Lambarschi (FC Academia Chişinău)
- (Moldova) Eugen Lavrinovici (FC Costuleni)
- (Romania) Cătălin Lichioiu (FC Olimpia)
- (Ukraine) Maksym Maksymenko (FC Tiraspol)
- (Moldova) Vitalie Manaliu (Rapid Ghidighici)
- (Moldova) Petru Marcov (CF Gagauziya)
- (Moldova) Andrei Martin (FC Sfîntul Gheorghe])
- (Moldova) Alexandru Maximov (Rapid Ghidighici)
- (Moldova) Nicolai Mincev (FC Iskra-Stal)
- (Moldova) Sergiu Mocanu (FC Costuleni)
- (Moldova) Ilie Mostovei (CF Gagauziya)
- (Moldova) Anton Munten (FC Zimbru Chişinău)
- (Ukraine) Igor Nagirnyi (FC Tiraspol)
- (Moldova) Sergiu Namaşco (FC Dacia Chişinău)
- (Russia) Aleksandr Nechayev (FC Dacia Chişinău)
- (Moldova) Andrei Negara (CF Gagauziya)
- (Moldova) Igor Negrescu (FC Dacia Chişinău)
- (Nigeria) David Ogoazi (FC Olimpia)
- (Nigeria) Jude Nonso Okoye (CF Gagauziya)
- (Moldova) Denis Orbu (FC Costuleni)
- (Moldova) Sergiu Paşcenco (FC Olimpia)
- (Guinea) Djibril Tamsir Paye (FC Tiraspol)
- (Moldova) Vitalie Plămădeală (FC Zimbru Chişinău)
- (Moldova) Sergiu Plătică (FC Sfîntul Gheorghe)
- (Moldova) Dumitru Popovici (FC Dacia Chişinău)
- (Moldova) Andrei Radiola (FC Tiraspol)
- (Romania) Ionuţ Florin Radu (FC Nistru Otaci)
- (Ukraine) Oleksyi Remezovskyi (FC Olimpia)
- (Moldova) Iurie Romaniuc (CF Gagauziya)
- (Moldova) Dorin Rotaru (FC Sfîntul Gheorghe)
- (Moldova) Vasile Rusu (Rapid Ghidighici)
- (Moldova) Denis Rusu (Rapid Ghidighici)
- (Mexico) Carlos Santana de la Vega (FC Olimpia)
- (Moldova) Andrei Secrieru (FC Zimbru Chişinău)
- (Moldova) Maxim Şoimu (FC Tiraspol)
- (Moldova) Tudor Starciuc (FC Costuleni)
- (Moldova) Petru Stîngă (FC Milsami)
- (Moldova) Alexandru Şveț (FC Tighina)
- (Moldova) Vladimir Ţăranu (FC Iskra-Stal)
- (Moldova) Valentin Ternavschi (FC Olimpia)
- (Moldova) Nicolae Titucenco (FC Tighina)
- (Russia) Eugeniu Tocilin (FC Sfîntul Gheorghe)
- (Moldova) Alexandru Tofan (Rapid Ghidighici)
- (Sierra Leone) Abu Tommy (FC Sheriff Tiraspol)
- (Ivory Coast) Ousmane Traore (FC Milsami)
- (Moldova) Nicolae Triboi (FC Academia Chişinău)
- (Moldova) Victor Truhanov (FC Iskra-Stal)
- (Georgia (country)) Giorgi Tukhashvili (FC Nistru Otaci)
- (Ukraine) Viktor Uzbek (FC Iskra-Stal)
- (Ukraine) Evgeniy Vishnyakov (FC Iskra-Stal)
- (Russia) Vitalie Sidorov (FC Olimpia)
- (Montenegro) Marko Đurović (FC Sheriff Tiraspol)

=== Hat-tricks ===
Key
^{4}	Player scored four goals
^{5}	Player scored five goals

Player	Home	Away	Result	Date
(Russia) Daniil Nikolaev	FC Costuleni	FC Academia Chişinău	1–5	15 August 2010
(Russia) Daniil Nikolaev	FC Academia Chişinău	CF Gagauziya	3–0	21 August 2010
(Moldova) Gheorghe Boghiu^{4}	FC Costuleni	FC Milsami	0–7	26 September 2010
(Latvia) Edgars Gauračs	FC Sheriff Tiraspol	FC Sfîntul Gheorghe	4–0	26 September 2010
(Georgia (country)) Levan Korgalidze	CF Gagauziya	FC Dacia Chişinău	1–4	31 October 2010
(Moldova) Ghenadie Orbu	FC Dacia Chişinău	FC Academia Chişinău	3–1	14 November 2010
(Moldova) Ghenadie Orbu	FC Dacia Chişinău	FC Sfîntul Gheorghe	7–0	12 December 2010
(Latvia) Edgars Gauračs^{5}	FC Tighina	FC Sheriff Tiraspol	0–7	18 December 2010
(Moldova) Mahai Cojusea^{4}	CF Gagauziya	FC Tighina	5–4	17 February 2011
(Moldova) Sergiu Zacon	CF Gagauziya	FC Tighina	5–4	17 February 2011
(Senegal) Amath Diedhiou	FC Sheriff Tiraspol	CF Gagauziya	5–1	12 March 2011
(Moldova) Gheorghe Boghiu^{4}	FC Milsami	FC Sfîntul Gheorghe	4–0	6 April 2011
(Moldova) Sergiu Grițuc	FC Nistru Otaci	FC Tighina	4–0	23 February 2011
(Burkina Faso) Wilfried Benjamin Balima	FC Tighina	FC Sheriff Tiraspol	0–7	13 May 2011
(Senegal) Amath Diedhiou^{4}	FC Sheriff Tiraspol	FC Costuleni	4–0	17 May 2011
(Moldova) Gheorghe Boghiu	FC Milsami	FC Tighina	7–2	17 May 2011

=== Clean sheets ===
As of 5 May 2013

Rank	Player	Club	Clean sheets
1	(Moldova) Nicolae Calancea	FC Zimbru Chișinău	20
2	(Moldova) Artiom Gaiduchevici	FC Iskra & FC Dacia Chișinău	19
3	(Moldova) Mihai Moraru	FC Milsami Orhei	18
4	(Moldova) Eugen Matiughin	FC Dacia Chișinău	16
5	(Moldova) Dumitru Stajila	FC Sheriff Tiraspol	13
5	(Moldova) Denis Rusu	FC Rapid Ghidighici	13
7	(Moldova) Serghei Pașcenco	FC Olimpia	11
7	(Moldova) Alexandru Zveaghințev	FC Tiraspol	11
9	(Bulgaria) Vladislav Stoyanov	FC Sheriff Tiraspol	10
10	(Moldova) Maxim Copeliciuc	FC Academia	9

== Top Foreigns ==
Place	Country	Goals	Players	Leading Goalscorers (Goals)Club
1.	Ukraine	46	16	Volodymyr Kilikevych (12) FC Iskra-Stal
2.	Russia	38	13	Daniil Nikolaev (9) FC Academia Chişinău
3.	Romania	28	10	Adrian Grigoruţă (8) FC Milsami
4.	(Georgia (country)) Georgia	24	6	Levan Korgalidze (13) FC Dacia Chişinău
5.	Nigeria	22	7	Julius Adaramola (8) FC Olimpia
6.	Brazil	15	3	Ademar Xavier (8) FC Milsami
7.	Senegal	13	1	Amath Diedhiou (13) FC Sheriff Tiraspol
8.	Latvia	10	1	Edgars Gauračs (10) FC Sheriff Tiraspol
9.	Ghana	9	4	Razak Salifu (4) FC Zimbru Chişinău
10.	Serbia	8	3	Aleksandar Pešić (5) FC Sheriff Tiraspol
11.	Burkina Faso	6	1	Wilfried Benjamin Balima (6) FC Sheriff Tiraspol
11.	Slovenia	6	2	Dalibor Volaš (4) FC Sheriff Tiraspol
13.	Haiti	5	1	Jean-Robens Jerome (5) FC Olimpia
13.	Montenegro	5	2	Vladimir Volkov (2) FC Sheriff Tiraspol
15.	Spain	3	1	Caio Suguino (3) FC Milsami
15.	Guinea	3	2	Thomas Kourouma (2) FC Olimpia
17.	Kazakhstan	2	1	Victor Berco (2) FC Zimbru Chişinău
17.	United States	2	1	Christian Camacho (2) FC Sfîntul Gheorghe
17.	Belarus	2	1	Vitaly Ledenev (2) FC Dacia Chişinău
20.	Cameroon	1	1	Titi Belle (1) FC Nistru Otaci
20.	Armenia	1	1	Artem Khachaturov (1) FC Sheriff Tiraspol
20.	Mexico	1	1	Carlos Santos de la Vega (1) FC Olimpia
20.	Sierra Leone	1	1	Abu Tommy (1) FC Sheriff Tiraspol
20.	Ivory Coast	1	1	Ousmane Traore (1) FC Milsami

== Moldova vs Rest of World ==
Country	Goals
Moldova	432
Rest of World	252

== Disciplinary ==
Final classification.

Rank	Player	Club	Yellow Cards	Red Cards	Points
1	(Moldova) Andrei Tcaciuc	FC Olimpia	10	2	16
1	(Ukraine) Oleksandr Feshchenko	FC Iskra-Stal	10	2	16
1	(Moldova) Alexandru Cheltuială	FC Olimpia	13	1	16
