= 2011 Moldovan Super Cup =

Supercupa Moldovei
Iskra-Stal Rîbnița	Dacia Chișinău
0	1
- Date: 8 July 2011
- Venue: Sheriff Small Arena, Tiraspol
- Referee: Ghenadie Sidenco
- Attendance: 1,500

The 2011 Moldovan Super Cup was the fifth Moldovan Super Cup (Romanian: Supercupa Moldovei), an annual Moldovan football match played by the winner of the national football league (the National Division) and the winner of the national Cup. The match was played between Dacia Chișinău, champions of the 2010–11 National Division, and Iskra-Stal Rîbnița, winners of the 2010–11 Moldovan Cup. It was held at the Sheriff Small Arena on 8 July 2011.

Dacia Chișinău won the match 1–0.

== Match ==
8 July 2011
18:00 EEST

Iskra-Stal Rîbnița	0–1	Dacia Chișinău
		Pavlov 12'

Sheriff Small Arena, Tiraspol
Attendance: 1,500
Referee: Ghenadie Sidenco

Iskra-Stal	Dacia

GK	1	(Moldova) Anatol Cebotari
DF	2	(Moldova) Sergiu Gafina		(substituted off) 58'
DF	17	(Ukraine) Vadym Leshchuk
DF	24	(Ukraine) Viktor Uzbek
MF	6	(Guinea) Thomas Kourouma
MF	7	(Moldova) Sergiu Zacon		(substituted off) 62'
MF	8	(Moldova) Andrei Porfireanu	(yellow card) 75'
MF	11	(Ukraine) Yevhen Vishnyakov		(substituted off) 46'
MF	15	(Ukraine) Sandro Shugladze		(substituted off) 46'
FW	9	(Moldova) Evgheni Gorodețchi
FW	20	(Ukraine) Oleksandr Suchu
Substitutes:
DF	5	(Moldova) Andrei Novicov		(substituted on) 58'
MF	9	(Moldova) Nicolai Rudac		(substituted on) 46'
MF	14	(Ukraine) * Denys Ponomar		(substituted on) 46'
MF	23	(Ukraine) Serhiy Chebotaryov		(substituted on) 62'
Manager:
(Moldova) Iurie Blonari

GK	1	(Moldova) Ghenadie Moșneaga
DF	2	(Serbia) Branislav Atanacković	(yellow card) 62'
DF	4	(Moldova) Denis Ilescu	(yellow card) 70'
DF	5	(Moldova) Dumitru Popovici
MF	18	(Moldova) Iurie Groșev
MF	20	(Moldova) Iulian Bursuc
MF	23	(Montenegro) Miloš Krkotić		(substituted off) 73'
FW	8	(Russia) Vasili Pavlov		(substituted off) 76'
FW	9	(Moldova) Ghenadie Orbu
FW	15	(North Macedonia) Kemal Alomerović		(substituted off) 68'
FW	19	(Moldova) Oleg Molla
Substitutions:
MF	11	(Moldova) Maxim Mihaliov		(substituted on) 68'
MF	21	(Moldova) Andrei Cojocari		(substituted on) 73'
FW	17	(Russia) Aleksandr Nechaev		(substituted on) 76'
Manager:
(Russia) Igor Dobrovolski

Assistant referees:
Anatol Bodean
Vitalie Gorbatov
Fourth official:
Iurie Covtun

Match rules

- 90 minutes.
- Penalty shoot-out if score is still level.
