= 2012–13 Moldovan "A" Division =

Moldovan "A" Division
- Season: 2012–13
- Champions: Veris Drăgăneşti
- Promoted: Veris Drăgăneşti; Dinamo-Auto Tiraspol
- Relegated: Maiak Chirsova
- Top goalscorer: Viorel Frunză (30 goals)

The 2012–13 Moldovan "A" Division season is the 22nd since its establishment. A total of 16 teams are contesting the league.

== Teams ==
Club	Location
Dacia-2 Buiucani	Chişinău
Dinamo-Auto	Tiraspol
Gagauziya	Comrat
Intersport-Aroma	Cobusca Nouă
Real Succes	Chişinău
Locomotiv Bălţi	Bălţi
Edineţ	Edineţ
FC Victoria	Bardar
Olimpia-2	Bălţi
Veris Drăgăneşti	Drăgăneşti
Saxan	Ceadîr-Lunga
Maiak	Chirsova
Sheriff-2	Tiraspol
Sfîntul Gheorghe	Suruceni
Tighina	Bendery
Zimbru-2	Chişinău

== League table ==
Pos	Team	Pld	W	D	L	GF	GA	GD	Pts	Promotion or relegation
1	Veris Drăgăneşti (C, P)	28	24	2	2	103	5	+98	74	Promotion to Divizia Națională
2	Sheriff-2 Tiraspol	28	20	4	4	79	21	+58	64	Ineligible for promotion
3	Dinamo-Auto Tiraspol (P)	28	17	5	6	51	23	+28	56	Promotion to Divizia Națională
4	Saxan Ceadîr-Lunga	28	16	5	7	55	27	+28	53	
5	Dacia-2 Buiucani	28	15	5	8	54	27	+27	50	Ineligible for promotion
6	Intersport-Aroma	28	14	3	11	41	31	+10	45	
7	Zimbru-2 Chișinău	28	11	9	8	48	26	+22	42	Ineligible for promotion
8	Sfîntul Gheorghe	28	12	4	12	38	51	−13	40	
9	Locomotiv Bălţi	28	11	4	13	54	57	−3	37	
10	Victoria Bardar	28	10	5	13	33	46	−13	35	
11	Gagauziya Comrat	28	10	3	15	37	59	−22	33	
12	Edineț	28	5	7	16	30	65	−35	22	
13	Tighina Bender	28	6	2	20	35	90	−55	20	withdrew (Note: Tighina Bender completed the season but withdrew from the league prior to the start of the next season.)
14	Real Succes Chișinău (Note: As per regulations, the 14th placed team, Real Succes Chișinău, was to be relegated to Divizia B, but the club spared relegation due to lack of teams.)	28	4	4	20	26	67	−41	16	
15	Maiak Chirsova (R)	28	3	2	23	34	123	−89	11	Relegation to Divizia B
16	Olimpia-2 Bălți (D)	0	0	0	0	0	0	0	0	Disqualified

Source: FMF (in Romanian)
Rules for classification: 1st points; 2nd head-to-head points; 3rd head-to-head goal difference; 4th head-to-head goals scored; 5th goal difference; 6th number of goals scored; 7th Fair Play competition
(C) Champions; (D) Disqualified; (P) Promoted; (R) Relegated

=== Round by round ===
Team ╲ Round	1	2	3	4	5	6	7	8	9	10	11	12	13	14	15	16	17	18	19	20	21	22	23	24	25	26	27	28	29	30
Veris Drăgăneşti	3	1	1	1	1	1	1	1	1	1	1	1	1	1	1	1	1	1	1	1	1	1	1	1	1	1	1	1	1	1
Sheriff-2 Tiraspol	13	9	4	3	5	3	3	2	2	2	2	4	4	3	2	2	2	2	2	2	2	2	2	2	2	2	2	2	2	2
Dinamo-Auto Tiraspol	6	3	2	2	3	4	4	3	3	3	3	2	2	4	4	3	3	3	3	3	3	3	3	3	3	3	3	3	3	3
Saxan Ceadîr-Lunga	7	4	8	9	6	9	8	11	11	11	10	11	11	10	8	8	7	6	5	4	4	4	4	4	4	4	4	4	4	4
Dacia-2 Buiucani	14	14	14	14	9	10	10	9	10	8	7	7	7	8	7	7	6	5	6	5	5	5	5	5	5	5	5	5	5	5
Intersport-Aroma	11	10	9	5	7	6	5	4	4	4	6	6	6	6	6	6	8	7	7	6	6	6	6	6	6	6	6	6	6	6
Zimbru-2 Chișinău	1	5	3	6	4	5	9	8	9	10	8	10	10	9	10	9	9	8	8	7	7	7	7	7	7	7	7	7	7	7
Sfîntul Gheorghe	10	8	5	4	2	2	2	5	5	6	4	3	3	2	3	4	4	4	4	8	8	8	8	8	8	8	8	8	8	8
Locomotiv Bălţi	5	7	10	11	8	8	6	10	7	7	5	5	5	5	5	5	5	9	9	9	9	9	9	9	9	9	9	9	9	9
Victoria Bardar	9	13	12	13	14	12	13	7	8	9	11	9	9	11	11	10	10	10	10	10	10	10	10	10	10	10	10	10	10	10
Gagauziya Comrat	4	2	6	8	12	14	14	13	14	14	14	14	14	13	13	13	12	11	11	11	11	11	11	11	11	11	11	11	11	11
Edineț	12	11	13	7	11	13	11	12	12	12	12	12	12	12	12	12	11	12	12	12	12	12	12	12	12	12	12	12	12	12
Tighina Bender	8	12	11	12	10	11	12	14	13	13	13	13	13	14	14	14	13	13	13	13	13	13	13	13	13	13	13	13	13	13
Real Succes Chișinău	15	15	15	15	16	15	15	15	15	15	15	15	15	15	15	15	14	14	14	14	14	14	14	14	14	14	14	14	14	14
Maiak Chirsova	16	16	16	16	15	16	16	16	16	16	16	16	16	16	16	16	15	15	15	15	15	15	15	15	15	15	15	15	15	15
Olimpia-2 Bălți	2	6	7	10	13	7	7	6	6	5	9	8	8	7	9	11	DQ	DQ	DQ	DQ	DQ	DQ	DQ	DQ	DQ	DQ	DQ	DQ	DQ	DQ

Source: FMF (in Romanian)
DQ = Disqualified

== Results ==
Home \ Away	DAC	DIN	GAG	INT	REA	LOC	VER	MAI	EDI	SAX	VIC	SHE	SFÎ	TIG	ZIM
Dacia-2 Buiucani		0–1	0–1	2–0	2–0	0–1	0–3	7–1	4–2	3–1	1–1	0–1	3–0	6–0	1–1
Dinamo-Auto Tiraspol	1–3		1–0	2–0	6–0	2–2	0–3	7–2	4–0	1–1	3–1	1–1	2–0	2–1	2–0
Gagauziya Comrat	1–5	1–2		0–1	3–2	2–1	0–4	4–1	1–0	2–2	1–1	3–1	3–1	2–3	1–1
Intersport-Aroma	2–1	0–1	6–1		1–0	1–0	0–0	2–0	6–0	1–2	2–2	0–1	1–0	3–1	0–0
Real Succes Chișinău	1–5	0–0	0–1	4–1		5–4	0–4	3–0	1–2	0–1	0–1	0–0	0–1	3–4	0–1
Locomotiv Bălţi	1–3	2–1	3–0	3–1	2–0		0–5	7–3	1–1	1–1	0–1	0–2	4–0	6–2	2–1
Veris Drăgăneşti	0–1	0–1	3–0	1–0	1–0	6–0		17–0	8–0	1–0	2–0	3–1	8–0	2–0	1–0
Maiak Chirsova	2–3	0–5	0–4	0–2	2–2	7–4	0–7		0–2	0–1	2–4	2–9	0–2	1–1	0–4
Edineț	0–0	0–1	5–0	0–1	2–1	0–2	0–2	3–4		0–3	2–2	0–3	1–1	3–2	1–1
Saxan Ceadîr-Lunga	1–1	2–0	2–0	1–2	3–0	4–1	0–2	3–2	8–3		0–1	1–0	3–0	6–0	1–1
Victoria Bardar	0–1	2–0	1–0	3–1	1–2	1–3	0–6	2–3	1–0	1–3		0–2	1–3	4–0	0–3
Sheriff-2 Tiraspol	2–0	1–0	5–0	3–1	10–0	3–1	2–2	5–0	4–0	3–1	4–0		3–0	5–2	5–2
Sfîntul Gheorghe	3–1	1–1	5–3	1–2	2–2	1–0	0–4	3–1	1–0	0–1	0–0	1–0		4–2	0–2
Tighina Bender	0–1	0–3	3–2	1–4	2–0	3–2	0–4	2–1	2–2	0–3	0–2	1–3	2–5		1–3
Zimbru-2 Chișinău	0–0	0–1	0–1	1–0	5–0	1–1	0–4	8–0	1–1	1–0	2–0	0–0	1–3	8–0	

Updated to match(es) played on 10 March 2013. Source: FMF (in Romanian)
Legend: Blue = home team win; Yellow = draw; Red = away team win.

== Top goalscorers ==
Updated to matches played on 1 June 2013.

Rank	Player	Club	Goals
1	(Moldova) Viorel Frunză	FC Veris	30
2	(Moldova) Yuri Myrza	FC Sheriff-2 Tiraspol	19
2	(Moldova) Maxim Iurcu	Dinamo-Auto	19
4	(Moldova) Dmitrii Vornişel	FC Saxan	15
5	(Moldova) Ion Cupțov	Locomotiv Bălţi	14
