= 2010–11 Moldovan Cup =

Cupa Moldovei

Tournament details
- Country: Moldova
- Teams: 30

Final positions
- Champions: Iskra-Stal
- Runners-up: Olimpia

2010-11 Moldovan Cup is the 20th season of the Moldovan annual football tournament. The competition started in September 2010 with the first round and will end with the final held on May 26, 2011.

== First round ==
In this round enter teams from lower divisions "A" Division and "B" Division. They will play against 6 winner teams from the second preliminary round. The draw took place September 14, 2010. The round matches are scheduled to be played September 15, 2010, unless otherwise noted.

Viişoara	2–1	Olimp
Flacăra	2–5	Mipan-Voran
Dava	1–5	Ursidos
Drochia	0–1	Locomotiv Bălţi
Orhei Star	2–3	Lilcora
Izvoraş-67	3–0	Dinamo-Auto Tiraspol
Trachia	1–4	Speranţa
Alifomix	0–3	CSCA-Buiucani
Saxan	2–3	Cahul-2005
Victoria	2–3	Intersport-Aroma

== Second round ==
In this round entered 6 teams from the National Division. These matches were played on 22 September 2010.

Team 1	Score	Team 2
Viişoara	0–6	Costuleni
Mipan-Voran	0–5	Tiraspol
Ursidos	2–0	Dinamo Bender
Locomotiv Bălţi	0–1	Lilcora
Izvoraş-67	4–1	Speranţa
CSCA-Buiucani	0–3	Sfîntul Gheorghe
Cahul-2005	0–0 (a.e.t.); 5–4 (pen.)	Găgăuzia
Intersport-Aroma	0–2	Nistru Otaci

== Third round ==
In this round entered the eight winners from the previous round and the remaining eight teams from the National Division. These matches were played on 27 October 2010.

Team 1	Score	Team 2
Sheriff	3–0	Costuleni
Tiraspol	1–1 (a.e.t.); 5–4 (pen.)	Milsami
Ursidos	0–1	Iskra-Stal
Lilcora	0–3	CSCA–Rapid
Izvoraş-67	0–4	Academia UTM
Olimpia	1–0	Sfîntul Gheorghe
Cahul-2005	1–1 (a.e.t.); 9–8 (pen.)	Zimbru
Nistru Otaci	1–4	Dacia

== Quarterfinals ==
This round featured the eight winners from the previous round and was played over two legs. The first legs were played on 10 November 2010 and the second legs were played on 24 November 2010.

Team 1	Agg.	Team 2	1st leg	2nd leg
CSCA–Rapid	1–3	Iskra-Stal	1–1	0–2
Tiraspol	2–5	Sheriff	2–3	0–2
Olimpia	3–0	Academia UTM	2–0	1–0
Cahul-2005	0–7	Dacia	0–0	0–7

== Semifinals ==
This round featured the four winners from the previous round and was played over two legs. The first legs were played on 19 April 2011 and the second legs were played on 3 May 2011. An interesting fact is that the semifinals pairs are exactly those that were played in the previous edition of the Moldovan Cup.

Team 1	Agg.	Team 2	1st leg	2nd leg
Dacia	1–3	Olimpia	0–1	1–2
Sheriff	1–3	Iskra-Stal	1–0	0–3

== Final ==
May 26, 2011
19:00 EEST

Iskra-Stal	2 – 1	Olimpia
Suchu 11'; Gorodeţchi 25'	Report	Ovseannicov 22'

Zimbru Stadium, Chişinău
Referee: Victor Gheciu

== Top goalscorers ==
Updated to matches played on 19 May 2013.

Rank	Player	Club	Goals
1	(Ukraine) Volodymyr Kilikevych	FC Iskra-Stal	3
1	(Moldova) Ghenadie Orbu	FC Dacia Chişinău	3
