= 2009–10 Moldovan "A" Division =

Moldovan "A" Division
- Season: 2009–10
- Champions: Costuleni
- Promoted: Costuleni; CF Gagauziya
- Biggest home win: Lilcora 8–0 Academia-2
- Biggest away win: Academia-2 0–9 Gagauziya

The 2009–10 Moldovan "A" Division season was the 19th since its establishment. A total of 16 teams contested the league.

== "A" Division Clubs ==
- FC Academia UTM-2 (Chişinău)
- CSCA Buiucani (Chişinău)
- FC Cahul-2005
- FC Costuleni
- FC Dinamo-2 (Bender)
- CF Gagauziya (Comrat)
- CF Intersport-Aroma Cobusca Nouă (Cobusca Nouă)
- RS Lilcora (Suruceni)
- Locomotiv Bălţi (Bălţi)
- Mipan (Chişinău)
- FC Olimp (Ungheni)
- FC Olimpia-2 Tiligul (Ternovca)
- FC Podiș (Ineşti)
- FC Sfîntul Gheorghe-2 (Suruceni)
- FC Sheriff-2 Tiraspol (Tiraspol)
- FC Zimbru-2 Chişinău (Chişinău)

== Final league table ==
Pos	Team	Pld	W	D	L	GF	GA	GD	Pts	Promotion or relegation
1	Costuleni (C, P)	30	24	2	4	90	27	+63	74	Promotion to Divizia Națională
2	RS Lilcora	30	22	6	2	77	32	+45	72	
3	CF Gagauziya (P)	30	18	4	8	62	32	+30	58	Promotion to Divizia Națională
4	FC Cahul-2005	30	16	5	9	44	33	+11	53	
5	Intersport-Aroma	30	15	7	8	43	26	+17	52	
6	Sheriff-2 Tiraspol	30	15	6	9	38	26	+12	51	Ineligible for promotion
7	Zimbru-2 Chișinău	30	14	5	11	44	34	+10	47	Ineligible for promotion
8	FC Podiș Inești	30	12	10	8	37	28	+9	46	withdrew (Note: FC Podiș Inești completed the season but withdrew from the league prior to the start of the next season.)
9	Locomotiv Bălţi	30	13	2	15	47	58	−11	41	
10	Dinamo-2 Bender	30	10	8	12	42	40	+2	38	Ineligible for promotion
11	Mipan	30	9	9	12	38	41	−3	36	
12	CSCA Buiucani	30	7	9	14	46	50	−4	30	
13	Olimp Ungheni	30	6	6	18	34	66	−32	24	
14	Sfîntul Gheorghe-2 Suruceni	30	5	5	20	33	60	−27	20	Ineligible for promotion
15	Olimpia-2 Tiligul	30	5	4	21	36	82	−46	19	Ineligible for promotion
16	Acatemia UTM-2	30	5	0	25	26	102	−76	15	Ineligible for promotion

Source: RSSSF
Rules for classification: 1st points; 2nd head-to-head points; 3rd head-to-head goal difference; 4th head-to-head goals scored; 5th goal difference; 6th number of goals scored; 7th Fair Play competition
(C) Champions; (P) Promoted
