= 2007–08 Moldovan "A" Division =

Moldovan "A" Division
- Season: 2007–08
- Champions: Sheriff-2 Tiraspol
- Promoted: Academia Chișinău

The 2007–08 Moldovan "A" Division season is the 17th since its establishment. A total of 17 teams are contesting the league:

| Club | Location |
|---|---|
| Sheriff-2 | Tiraspol |
| Beşiktaş Chișinău | Chișinău |
| Academia | Chișinău |
| FC Petrocub | Sărata-Galbenă |
| FC Floreni | Floreni |
| Locomotiv | Bălţi |
| Viitorul | Orhei |
| Cahul-2005 | Cahul |
| Gagauziya | Comrat |
| Zimbru-2 | Chișinău |
| Dinamo-2 Bender | Tighina |
| Eikomena | Chișinău |
| Intersport-Aroma | Cobusca Nouă |
| Dacia-2 Goliador | Chișinău |
| Olimpia-2 | Bălţi |
| Olimp | Ungheni |
| Izvoraş-67 | Ratuș |

== League table ==
| Pos | Team | Pld | W | D | L | GF | GA | GD | Pts | Promotion or relegation |
|---|---|---|---|---|---|---|---|---|---|---|
| 1 | Sheriff-2 Tiraspol (C) | 32 | 24 | 3 | 5 | 79 | 19 | +60 | 75 | Ineligible for promotion |
| 2 | Beşiktaş Chișinău | 32 | 21 | 5 | 6 | 73 | 32 | +41 | 68 | withdrew |
| 3 | Academia Chișinău (P) | 32 | 18 | 10 | 4 | 73 | 23 | +50 | 64 | Promotion to Divizia Națională |
| 4 | FC Petrocub Sărata Galbenă | 32 | 19 | 6 | 7 | 51 | 27 | +24 | 63 | withdrew |
| 5 | FC Floreni | 32 | 15 | 8 | 9 | 63 | 45 | +18 | 53 | |
| 6 | Locomotiv Bălţi | 32 | 14 | 8 | 10 | 61 | 57 | +4 | 50 | |
| 7 | Viitorul Orhei | 32 | 15 | 4 | 13 | 61 | 45 | +16 | 49 | |
| 8 | Cahul-2005 | 32 | 14 | 5 | 13 | 44 | 43 | +1 | 47 | |
| 9 | Gagauziya Comrat | 32 | 13 | 8 | 11 | 43 | 54 | −11 | 47 | |
| 10 | Zimbru-2 Chișinău | 32 | 13 | 5 | 14 | 52 | 39 | +13 | 44 | Ineligible for promotion |
| 11 | Dinamo-2 Bender | 32 | 10 | 7 | 15 | 46 | 56 | −10 | 37 | Ineligible for promotion |
| 12 | Eikomena P.A. | 32 | 9 | 7 | 16 | 29 | 57 | −28 | 34 | |
| 13 | Intersport-Aroma | 32 | 8 | 9 | 15 | 32 | 59 | −27 | 33 | |
| 14 | Dacia-2 Goliador | 32 | 7 | 10 | 15 | 36 | 50 | −14 | 31 | withdrew |
| 15 | Olimpia-2 Bălți | 32 | 7 | 4 | 21 | 25 | 61 | −36 | 25 | withdrew |
| 16 | Olimp Ungheni | 32 | 7 | 4 | 21 | 24 | 81 | −57 | 25 | |
| 17 | Izvoraş-67 | 32 | 5 | 3 | 24 | 28 | 72 | −44 | 18 | |

Source: Moldovan Football Federation (in Romanian)
Rules for classification: 1st points; 2nd head-to-head points; 3rd head-to-head goal difference; 4th head-to-head goals scored; 5th goal difference; 6th number of goals scored; 7th Fair Play competition
(C) Champions; (P) Promoted
