= 2010–11 FC Costuleni season =

FC Costuleni
2010–11 season
- Manager: (Moldova) Ilie Vieru
- National Division: 10th
- Moldovan Cup: Third round

2010–11 season is the first Moldovan National Division season in the history of Costuleni.

The team finished in 10th place in the table.

== Squad ==
Note: Flags indicate national team as defined under FIFA eligibility rules; some limited exceptions apply. Players may hold more than one non-FIFA nationality.

No.	Pos.	Nation	Player
1	GK	MDA	Vladimir Levanov
2	DF	MDA	Alexei Melnic
3	MF	MDA	Oleg Şoimu
4	MF	MDA	Mihail Cabac
5	DF	MDA	Denis Orbu
7	MF	MDA	Marcel Reşitca
8	DF	MDA	Anatolie Gladicov
9	MF	MDA	Serghei Mocanu
10	FW	MDA	Eduard Tomaşcov
11	FW	MDA	Serghei Ciuico
13	FW	MDA	Ruslan Barburoş
14	DF	MDA	Ivan Castraveţ
15	MF	MDA	Sergiu Dubac

No.	Pos.	Nation	Player
16	MF	MDA	Victor Marian
17	DF	MDA	Maxim Bogaciuc
18	MF	MDA	Andrei Vrabie
19	DF	MDA	Roman Ghencea
20	FW	MDA	Ivan Cheşcu
21	MF	MDA	Ştefan Cazacu
22	FW	MDA	Tudor Starciuc
—	MF	MDA	Andrei Bereghici
—	DF	MDA	Petru Şaru
—	MF	MDA	Hussein Sarmd
—	MF	NGA	Samuel Udobia
—	FW	MDA	Alehander Vislis
—	GK	MDA	Andrei Macoviiciuc
