= 2006–07 Moldovan "A" Division =

Moldovan "A" Division
- Season: 2006–07
- Champions: Zimbru-2 Chișinău
- Promoted: Rapid Ghidighici; CSCA Chișinău

The 2006–07 Moldovan "A" Division season is the 16th since its establishment. A total of 14 teams are contesting the league:

| Club | Location |
|---|---|
| Sheriff-2 | Tiraspol |
| Rapid Ghidighici | Ghidighici |
| Academia | Chișinău |
| CSCA Chișinău | Chișinău |
| FC Floreni | Floreni |
| Energhetic Dubăsari | Dubăsari |
| Gagauziya | Comrat |
| Zimbru-2 | Chișinău |
| Tighina-2 | Tighina |
| Intersport-Aroma | Cobusca Nouă |
| Dacia-2 Goliador | Chișinău |
| Olimpia-2 | Bălți |
| Olimp | Ungheni |
| Izvoraş-67 | Ratuș |

== League table ==
| Pos | Team | Pld | W | D | L | GF | GA | GD | Pts | Promotion or relegation |
|---|---|---|---|---|---|---|---|---|---|---|
| 1 | Zimbru-2 Chișinău (C) | 26 | 17 | 6 | 3 | 62 | 22 | +40 | 57 | Ineligible for promotion |
| 2 | Rapid Ghidighici (P) | 26 | 17 | 5 | 4 | 57 | 19 | +38 | 56 | Promotion to Divizia Națională |
| 3 | CSCA Chișinău (Note: CSCA-Agro Stauceni changed their name to CSCA Chișinău ahead of the season.) (P) | 26 | 15 | 10 | 1 | 52 | 17 | +35 | 55 | Promotion to Divizia Națională |
| 4 | Dinamo-2 Bender | 26 | 15 | 5 | 6 | 61 | 29 | +32 | 50 | Ineligible for promotion |
| 5 | FC Floreni | 26 | 12 | 9 | 5 | 46 | 28 | +18 | 45 | |
| 6 | Olimpia-2 Bălți | 26 | 11 | 8 | 7 | 36 | 33 | +3 | 41 | Ineligible for promotion |
| 7 | Intersport-Aroma | 26 | 10 | 7 | 9 | 25 | 29 | −4 | 37 | |
| 8 | Dacia-2 Goliador | 26 | 9 | 9 | 8 | 39 | 36 | +3 | 36 | Ineligible for promotion |
| 9 | Sheriff-2 Tiraspol | 26 | 9 | 6 | 11 | 48 | 35 | +13 | 33 | Ineligible for promotion |
| 10 | Academia Chișinău | 26 | 9 | 5 | 12 | 38 | 47 | −9 | 32 | |
| 11 | Energhetic Dubăsari | 26 | 5 | 6 | 15 | 17 | 38 | −21 | 21 | withdrew |
| 12 | Izvoraş-67 | 26 | 5 | 4 | 17 | 26 | 65 | −39 | 19 | |
| 13 | Moldova-03 Ungheni | 26 | 3 | 4 | 19 | 21 | 81 | −60 | 13 | |
| 14 | Gagauziya Comrat | 26 | 1 | 4 | 21 | 15 | 64 | −49 | 7 | |

Source: Moldovan Football Federation (in Romanian)
Rules for classification: 1st points; 2nd head-to-head points; 3rd head-to-head goal difference; 4th head-to-head goals scored; 5th goal difference; 6th number of goals scored; 7th Fair Play competition
(C) Champions; (P) Promoted
