= 2010–11 Moldovan "A" Division =

Moldovan "A" Division
- Season: 2010–11
- Champions: Locomotiv
- Biggest home win: Buiucani 11:0 Olimp
- Biggest away win: Olimpia-2 0:6 Ursidos; Olimpia-2 1:7 Locomotiv; Buiucani 1:7 Sheriff-2

The 2010–11 Moldovan "A" Division season was the 20th since its establishment. A total of 16 teams contested the league. No promotees were declared eligible at the end of the season, as none of the first four placed teams met the requirements for a National Division license.

== Stadiums and locations ==
Location of teams in "A" Division 2010–11

Club	Location
Academia-2	Chişinău
Cahul-2005	Cahul
CSCA-Buiucani	Chişinău
Dinamo-2	Bender
Dinamo-Auto	Tiraspol
Intersport-Aroma	Cobusca Nouă
Lilcora	Chişinău
Locomotiv	Bălţi
Mipan-Voran	Chişinău
Olimp	Ungheni
Olimpia-2	Tîrnauca
Sfîntul Gheorghe-2	Suruceni
Sheriff-2	Tiraspol
Speranţa	Crihana Veche
Ursidos	Chişinău
Zimbru-2	Chişinău

== League table ==
Pos	Team	Pld	W	D	L	GF	GA	GD	Pts	Relegation
1	Locomotiv Bălţi (C)	28	17	8	3	59	23	+36	59	
2	Ursidos Chişinău	28	16	10	2	63	17	+46	58	
3	Dinamo-Auto Tiraspol	28	17	6	5	52	26	+26	57	
4	Intersport-Aroma	28	15	9	4	53	20	+33	54	
5	Sheriff-2 Tiraspol	28	15	5	8	64	26	+38	50	
6	Lilcora	28	14	6	8	55	38	+17	48	
7	Cahul-2005	28	13	5	10	35	40	−5	44	
8	CSCA–Buiucani Chişinău	28	12	6	10	56	45	+11	42	
9	Zimbru-2 Chișinău	28	9	7	12	38	33	+5	34 (Note: SPE 1–1 ZIM; ZIM 3–0 SPE)	
10	Speranța Crihana Veche	28	9	7	12	32	45	−13	34	
11	Mipan-Voran Chişinău	28	9	2	17	45	72	−27	29	
12	Sfîntul Gheorghe-2 Suruceni	28	7	4	17	28	48	−20	25	
13	Dinamo-2 Bender (R)	28	5	6	17	27	60	−33	21	Relegation to 2011–12 Moldovan "B" Division (Note: The main team relegated from the 2010–11 Moldovan National Division.)
14	Olimp Ungheni	28	4	7	17	31	75	−44	19	
15	Olimpia-2 Tiligul	28	4	0	24	16	86	−70	12	
–	Academia UTM-2 Chişinău (R)	0	0	0	0	0	0	0	0	Relegation to 2011–12 Moldovan "B" Division (Note: Academia UTM-2 Chişinău retired from the championship. All results were annulled.)

Updated to match(es) played on 4 June 2011. Source: Moldovan Football Federation (in Romanian)
Rules for classification: 1) points; 2) goal difference; 3) number of goals scored.
(C) Champions; (R) Relegated
