= 2011–12 Moldovan "A" Division =

Moldovan "A" Division
- Season: 2011–12
- Champions: FC Sheriff-2 Tiraspol
- Promoted: FC Speranţa Cahul
- Relegated: FC Rapid-2 Ghidighici, FC Milsami-2 Orhei, CS Mipan-Voran Chișinău, FC Sfîntul Gheorghe-2 Suruceni
- Goals: 713
- Average goals/game: 2.97
- Biggest home win: FC Zimbru-2 Chișinău 7–1 RS Lilcora FC Olimpia-2 6–0 FC Sfîntul Gheorghe-2 Suruceni FC Dinamo-Auto Tiraspol 6–0 CF Locomotiv Bălţi
- Biggest away win: CS Mipan-Voran Chișinău 0–5 FC Sheriff-2 Tiraspol FC Tighina 2–7 CF Intersport-Aroma Cobusca Nouă
- Highest scoring: CF Locomotiv Bălţi 3–6 FC Sheriff-2 Tiraspol FC Milsami-2 Orhei 5–4 CF Gagauziya FC Tighina 2–7 CF Intersport-Aroma Cobusca Nouă FC Tighina 4–5 RS Lilcora

The 2011–12 Moldovan "A" Division season was the 21st season of Moldovan "A" Division since its establishment. A total of 16 teams contested the league.

== Teams ==
Club	Location
Dacia-2	Chişinău
Dinamo-Auto	Tiraspol
Gagauziya	Comrat
Intersport-Aroma	Cobusca Nouă
Lilcora	Chișinău
Locomotiv	Bălţi
Milsami-2 Ursidos	Orhei
Mipan-Voran	Chișinău
Olimpia-2	Bălţi
Rapid-2	Ghidighici
Saxan	Ceadîr-Lunga
Sfîntul Gheorghe-2	Suruceni
Sheriff-2	Tiraspol
Speranţa	Cahul
Tighina	Bender
Zimbru-2	Chișinău

== League table ==
Pos	Team	Pld	W	D	L	GF	GA	GD	Pts	Promotion or relegation
1	Sheriff-2 Tiraspol (C)	30	21	6	3	75	27	+48	69	Ineligible for promotion
2	Speranța Crihana Veche (P)	30	20	6	4	52	23	+29	66	Promotion to Divizia Națională
3	Dacia-2 Buiucani	30	19	5	6	65	28	+37	62	Ineligible for promotion
4	Intersport-Aroma	30	16	5	9	54	41	+13	53	
5	Saxan Ceadîr-Lunga	30	14	8	8	49	25	+24	50	
6	Zimbru-2 Chișinău	30	15	4	11	54	37	+17	49	Ineligible for promotion
7	Dinamo-Auto Tiraspol	30	13	7	10	52	32	+20	46	
8	Olimpia-2 Bălți	30	12	6	12	37	35	+2	42	Ineligible for promotion
9	Gagauziya Comrat	30	11	6	13	43	54	−11	39 (Note: GAG 1–0 RAP; RAP 2–1 GAG)	
10	CSCA-Rapid-2 Ghidighici	30	11	6	13	31	45	−14	39	withdrew
11	Locomotiv Bălţi	30	11	5	14	42	59	−17	38	
12	Tighina Bender	30	10	5	15	43	53	−10	35	
13	Lilcora	30	6	8	16	36	56	−20	26 (Note: LIL 3–1 MIL; MIL 2–2 LIL)	
14	Milsami-2 Ursidos Orhei	30	7	5	18	31	60	−29	26	withdrew
15	Mipan-Voran Chişinău	30	6	5	19	27	62	−35	23	withdrew
16	Sfîntul Gheorghe-2 Suruceni	30	2	5	23	22	76	−54	11	withdrew

Source: FMF (in Romanian)
Rules for classification: 1st points; 2nd head-to-head points; 3rd head-to-head goal difference; 4th head-to-head goals scored; 5th goal difference; 6th number of goals scored; 7th Fair Play competition
(C) Champions; (P) Promoted

=== Round by round ===
Team ╲ Round	1	2	3	4	5	6	7	8	9	10	11	12	13	14	15	16	17	18	19	20	21	22	23	24	25	26	27	28	29	30
Sheriff-2 Tiraspol	5	2	1	1	1	1	1	1	1	1	1	1	1	1	1	1	1	1	1	1	1	1	2	2	2	2	1	1	1	1
Speranța Crihana Veche	1	6	5	3	2	3	2	2	2	4	3	2	2	2	2	2	2	2	2	2	2	2	1	1	1	1	2	2	2	2
Dacia-2 Buiucani	6	8	10	9	9	9	9	7	5	5	5	4	3	3	5	3	3	3	4	3	4	4	3	3	3	3	3	3	3	3
Intersport-Aroma	16	12	8	8	5	4	3	4	4	3	4	5	4	5	4	5	4	4	3	4	3	3	4	5	5	5	4	4	4	4
Saxan Ceadîr-Lunga	8	13	14	10	12	10	6	8	6	6	8	8	8	8	8	8	7	7	8	9	9	7	9	7	6	8	6	6	5	5
Zimbru-2 Chișinău	3	1	2	2	3	2	4	3	3	2	2	3	5	4	3	4	5	5	5	5	5	5	5	4	4	4	5	5	6	6
Dinamo-Auto Tiraspol	2	5	11	11	13	13	11	14	14	14	14	14	14	14	14	13	14	14	14	13	12	12	12	10	10	10	10	8	7	7
Olimpia-2 Bălți	9	4	3	4	6	8	10	13	11	9	7	7	7	6	7	7	8	8	9	7	7	8	6	8	7	6	7	7	8	8
Gagauziya Comrat	7	10	9	12	10	6	7	5	7	7	6	6	6	7	6	6	6	6	6	6	6	6	8	6	9	7	8	9	9	9
CSCA-Rapid-2 Ghidighici	13	14	12	14	14	14	14	12	13	13	13	13	12	12	9	11	9	9	7	8	8	9	7	9	8	9	9	10	11	10
Locomotiv Bălţi	10	7	4	5	8	11	12	10	12	11	12	12	10	11	10	9	10	10	11	10	11	10	11	12	11	11	11	11	10	11
Tighina Bender	11	9	6	7	4	5	5	6	9	8	10	10	13	13	13	14	13	11	10	11	10	11	10	11	12	12	12	12	12	12
Lilcora	4	3	7	6	7	7	8	9	8	10	11	11	9	9	11	10	11	12	12	12	13	13	13	13	13	13	13	13	13	13
Milsami-2 Ursidos Orhei	12	15	15	16	16	16	16	15	15	15	15	15	15	15	15	15	15	15	15	15	15	15	15	14	14	15	14	15	14	14
Mipan-Voran Chişinău	15	11	13	13	11	12	13	11	10	12	9	9	11	10	12	12	12	13	13	14	14	14	14	15	15	14	15	14	15	15
Sfîntul Gheorghe-2 Suruceni	14	16	16	15	15	15	15	16	16	16	16	16	16	16	16	16	16	16	16	16	16	16	16	16	16	16	16	16	16	16

Source: FMF (in Romanian)

== Results ==
Home \ Away	DAC	DIN	GAG	INT	LIL	LOC	MIL	MIP	OLI	RAP	SAX	SFG	SHE	SCV	TIG	ZIM
Dacia-2 Buiucani		0–2	1–2	1–0	0–1	3–2	3–0	5–0	1–0	6–2	2–1	4–1	2–1	5–1	1–1	2–0
Dinamo-Auto Tiraspol	4–4		3–0 (Note: This match was originally a 3–1 win for Dinamo-Auto, but the disciplinary and contest commission awarded Dinamo-Auto a 3–0 win as Gagauziya fielded ineligible players.)	1–1	2–0	6–0	4–0	0–2	3–1	1–1	1–1	1–0	1–3	1–3	0–1	3–0
Gagauziya Comrat	1–5	2–0		2–0	2–2	2–1	0–1	4–2	2–1	1–0	0–3 (Note: This match was originally a 1–1 draw, but the disciplinary and contest commission awarded Saxan a 3–0 win as Găgăuzia fielded ineligible players.)	2–1	2–2	0–1	2–1	1–1
Intersport-Aroma	1–0	0–4	3–1		1–1	2–0	2–1	1–0	2–1	1–2	1–1	3–1	2–2	0–2	3–2	1–0
Lilcora	0–0	0–1	1–1	0–4		3–5	3–1	1–0	1–3	0–1	2–3	3–0	2–3	1–2	4–1	1–1
Locomotiv Bălţi	0–2	3–2	2–2	2–1	1–0		3–1	2–1	1–1	2–0	2–3	4–1	3–6	2–2	2–0	2–1
Milsami-2 Ursidos Orhei	1–3	0–0	5–4	0–2	2–2	0–1		0–2	0–3 (Note: The disciplinary and contest commission awarded Olimpia-2 a 3–0 win as Milsami-2 Ursidos did not ensure security conditions for the game.)	1–4	0–2	4–0	0–4	0–3	1–1	1–0
Mipan-Voran Chişinău	1–2	0–2	2–1	1–2	0–0	1–0	2–2		0–3	0–2	0–2	3–3	0–5	0–0	2–0	1–4
Olimpia-2 Bălți	2–1	0–4	2–1	3–2	1–0	0–0	0–2	0–1		1–0	0–0	6–0	0–2	0–3	3–1	2–1
CSCA-Rapid-2 Ghidighici	0–2	0–3	2–1	0–4	2–0	2–0	1–1	2–0	0–0		0–0	2–1	1–5	0–2	1–0	2–1
Saxan Ceadîr-Lunga	1–3	0–0	2–2	0–1	4–1	5–0	2–0	2–1	0–0	2–0		4–0	2–2	1–0	3–0	0–1
Sfîntul Gheorghe-2 Suruceni	0–2	1–1	0–2	0–3	2–0	0–0	1–4	1–1	1–2	2–2	0–3		1–4	1–3	0–2	3–1
Sheriff-2 Tiraspol	0–0	2–1	3–0 (Note: This match was originally a 0–1 win for Găgăuzia, but the disciplinary and contest commission awarded Sheriff-2 a 3–0 win as Găgăuzia fielded ineligible players.)	5–0	1–0	3–0	2–1	4–0	3–1	0–0	2–1	3–1		2–0	3–1	0–1
Speranța Crihana Veche	1–1	1–0	1–0	3–1	1–1	3–0 (Note: The disciplinary and contest commission awarded Speranța a 3–0 win as Locomotiv did not show up for the game.)	3–0	5–1	1–0	3–1	1–0	2–0	2–0		0–0	2–1
Tighina Bender	2–1	4–1	2–3	2–7	4–5	3–1	3–1	3–2	0–0	2–0	1–0	2–0	1–2	1–1		1–2
Zimbru-2 Chișinău	0–3	2–0	4–0	3–3	7–1	3–1	0–1	4–1	2–1	3–1	2–1	3–0	1–1	3–0	2–1	

Updated to match(es) played on 30 May 2012. Source: FMF (in Romanian)
Legend: Blue = home team win; Yellow = draw; Red = away team win.
