= 2005–06 Moldovan "A" Division =

Moldovan "A" Division
- Season: 2005–06
- Champions: Zimbru-2 Chișinău
- Promoted: Olimpia Bălți; Iskra-Stal Rîbnița

The 2005–06 Moldovan "A" Division season is the 15th since its establishment. A total of 16 teams are contesting the league.

== League table ==
Pos	Team	Pld	W	D	L	GF	GA	GD	Pts	Promotion or relegation
1	Zimbru-2 Chișinău (C)	28	23	4	1	79	13	+66	73	Ineligible for promotion
2	Sheriff-2 Tiraspol	28	20	5	3	71	28	+43	65	Ineligible for promotion
3	Olimpia Bălți (P)	28	18	5	5	66	23	+43	59	Promotion to Divizia Națională
4	Iskra-Stal Rîbnița (P)	28	17	7	4	54	31	+23	58	Promotion to Divizia Națională
5	FC Floreni	28	13	9	6	45	31	+14	48	
6	Rapid Ghidighici (Note: The newly relegated Steaua Chișinău changed their name to FC Rapid Ghidighici ahead of the season.)	28	12	10	6	42	23	+19	46	
7	CSCA-Agro Stauceni (Note: FCA Victoria Chișinău changed their name to CSCA-Agro Stauceni ahead of the season.)	28	12	7	9	46	31	+15	43	
8	Intersport-Aroma	28	10	9	9	26	25	+1	39	
9	USC Gagauziya	28	10	7	11	46	28	+18	37	
10	Energhetic Dubăsari	28	8	6	14	27	42	−15	30	
11	Tiligul-Tiras-2 Tiraspol	28	8	5	15	31	40	−9	29	withdrew
12	Moldova-03 Ungheni	28	6	6	16	27	66	−39	24	
13	Goliador-SS-11	28	3	7	18	19	62	−43	16	
14	FC Glodeni (Note: FC Orhei excluded after round 1 and replaced by FC Glodeni.) (R)	28	2	2	24	12	89	−77	8	Relegation to Divizia B
15	Avenarex (Note: Avenarex withdrew during spring season and had all remaining matches awarded 0-3 against them.)	28	1	5	22	14	73	−59	8	withdrew
-	FC Otaci (Note: FC Otaci withdrew after the winter break; all matches annulled. Record at withdrawal: Pld=15; W=7; D=1; L=7; GF–GA=20-25; PTS=22)	0	0	0	0	0	0	0	0	withdrew

Source: RSSSF
(C) Champions; (P) Promoted; (R) Relegated
