= Iulian Erhan =

Moldovan professional footballer

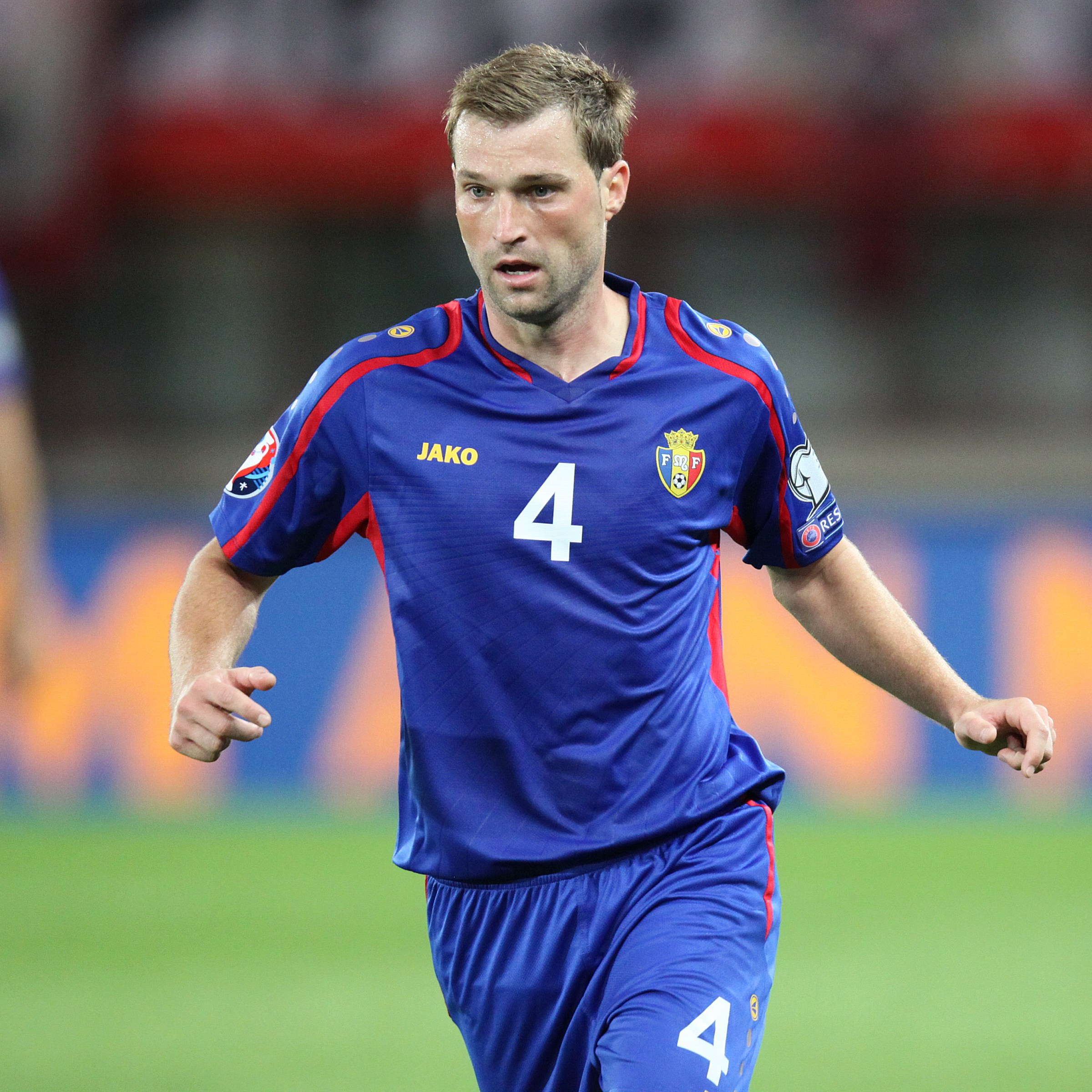

Personal information
- Date of birth: 1 July 1986 (age 40)
- Place of birth: Chișinău, Moldovan SSR
- Height: 1.81 m (5 ft 11 in)
- Position: Defender

Youth career
- 1996–2000: ȘSSRF Rîșcani Chișinău
- 2001–2002: Zimbru Chișinău

Senior career*
Years	Team	Apps	(Gls)
2003–2009	Zimbru Chișinău	60	(0)
2003–2006	→ Zimbru-2 Chișinău	64	(0)
2008	→ CSCA-Rapid Chișinău (loan)	6	(0)
2010	Mordovia Saransk	14	(0)
2011–2012	Zimbru Chișinău	36	(0)
2012	Academia Chișinău	16	(2)
2013	Torpedo-BelAZ Zhodino	13	(0)
2014	Zimbru Chișinău	24	(1)
2015	Milsami Orhei	19	(0)
2016	Academia Chișinău	11	(0)
2016–2017	Zaria Bălți	12	(0)
2017–2018	Sfântul Gheorghe	41	(2)
2020	Spartanii Selemet		
2021–2022	Victoria Bardar		

International career
2007–2008	Moldova U21	7	(0)
2011–2015	Moldova	10	(0)
- * Club domestic league appearances and goals as of 31 December 2018

Iulian Erhan (born 1 July 1986) is a Moldovan professional footballer.

He has several caps for his national football team.

== Honours ==
Zimbru Chișinău

- Moldovan Cup: 2006–07, 2013–14
- Moldovan Super Cup: 2014

Zimbru-2 Chișinău

- Moldovan "A" Division: 2005–06, 2006–07

Milsami Orhei

- Moldovan National Division: 2014–15
