= Petru Hvorosteanov =

Moldovan footballer

Personal information
- Date of birth: 28 August 1986 (age 40)
- Place of birth: Moldovan SSR
- Height: 1.81 m (5 ft 11 1/2 in)
- Position: Midfielder

Senior career*
Years	Team	Apps	(Gls)
2003–2005	Unisport-Auto Chișinău	11	(0)
2006	Iskra-Stal	1	(0)
2007	Dacia Chișinău	1	(0)
2008–2010	Zimbru Chișinău	76	(4)
2011	Andijan	12	(0)
2011–2012	Iskra-Stal	22	(0)
2012	Šiauliai	5	(0)
2012–2013	Costuleni	16	(0)
2013	Slavia Mozyr	5	(0)
2014	Costuleni	21	(0)
2015	Academia Chișinău	10	(0)
- * Club domestic league appearances and goals as of 31 May 2015

Petru Hvorosteanov (born 28 August 1986) is a Moldovan former professional footballer.
