= 2006–07 Moldovan "B" Division =

Moldovan "B" Division
- Season: 2006–07

The 2006–07 Moldovan "B" Division (Romanian: Divizia B) was the 16th season of Moldovan football's third-tier league. There are 23 teams in the competition, in two groups, 11 in the North Moldovan and 12 in the South Moldovan .

== "B" Division North ==
=== Final standings ===
Pos	Team	Pld	W	D	L	GF	GA	GD	Pts
1	Locomotiva Bălți	18	13	5	0	48	12	+36	44
2	Petrocub Sărata Galbenă	18	12	4	2	44	25	+19	40
3	FC Viitorul Step-Soci	18	9	7	2	38	15	+23	34
4	Viişoara Mileștii Mici	18	9	5	4	42	24	+18	32
5	Podiş Ineşti	18	9	5	4	43	26	+17	32
6	Flacăra Faleşti	18	6	5	7	29	33	−4	23
7	FC Florești	18	4	4	10	14	35	−21	16
8	FC Telenești	18	3	2	13	20	45	−25	11
9	Scânteia Stauceni	18	2	3	13	16	44	−28	9
10	FC Glodeni	18	1	4	13	13	48	−35	7
–	Vierul Sîngerei (W)	0	0	0	0	0	0	0	0

(W) Withdrew after 2 round, all results annulled

== "B" Division South ==
=== Final standings ===
Pos	Team	Pld	W	D	L	GF	GA	GD	Pts
1	FC Cahul-2005	22	19	2	1	72	13	+59	59
2	Crasbil Gura Galbenă	22	18	1	3	81	24	+57	55
3	Fortuna Pleșeni	22	17	1	4	72	17	+55	52
4	Buiucani-Rapid-2 Ghidighici	22	14	2	6	70	34	+36	44
5	Kolos Copceac	22	10	2	10	41	45	−4	32
6	Victoria Bardar	22	9	4	9	37	39	−2	31
7	CSF Cricova	22	9	4	9	40	38	+2	31
8	FC Slobozia Mare	22	9	3	10	34	44	−10	30
9	Rodina Chirsova (Note: Rodina Chirsova occasionally play home matches in Comrat)	22	6	1	15	30	70	−40	19
10	Sinteza Căușeni	22	5	1	16	24	68	−44	16
11	Trachia Taraclia	22	2	2	18	23	73	−50	8
12	Steaua Boldurești	22	2	1	19	15	74	−59	7
