= Adaramola =

Adaramola is a Yoruba surname. Notable people with the surname include:

- Julius Adaramola (born 1990), Nigerian footballer
- Tayo Adaramola (born 2003), Irish footballer
