= Yevhen Bulyi =

Ukrainian professional football defender

Personal information
- Full name: Yevhen Dmytrovych Bulyi
- Date of birth: 18 July 1995 (age 31)
- Place of birth: Ukraine
- Height: 1.80 m (5 ft 11 in)
- Position: Defender

Youth career
- 2008–2011: FC Chornomorets Odesa

Senior career*
Years	Team	Apps	(Gls)
2011–2014	FC Chornomorets Odesa	0	(0)
2011	→FC Chornomorets-2 Odesa	3	(0)
2014	FC Costuleni	2	(0)
- * Club domestic league appearances and goals as of 10 January 2015

Yevhen Bulyi (Ukrainian: Євген Дмитрович Булий; born 18 July 1995) is a Ukrainian professional football defender who played for FC Costuleni in the Moldovan National Division.

Bulyi is product of youth team systems of FC Chornomorets. From August 2014 he played for FC Costuleni.
