= Yakup Sertkaya =

Turkish footballer

Personal information
- Full name: Yakup Sertkaya
- Date of birth: 23 September 1978 (age 48)
- Place of birth: Kardzhali, Bulgaria
- Height: 1.74 m (5 ft 9 in)
- Position: Right winger

Youth career
- 1997–1999: Altay

Senior career*
Years	Team	Apps	(Gls)
1997–2002	Altay	100	(15)
2002–2006	Bursaspor	83	(3)
2006–2008	Altay	61	(2)
2008–2010	Bucaspor	56	(2)
2010–2011	Balıkesirspor	4	(0)
2011–2012	Costuleni	20	(2)
2012–2013	Altay	6	(0)
2013–2014	Costuleni	13	(0)
- * Club domestic league appearances and goals as of 30 June 2014

Yakup Sertkaya (born 23 September 1978) is a former Turkish professional footballer.

He started his career with Altay S.K. and then he also played for Bursaspor and Moldovan side FC Costuleni.
