= Sergiu Grițuc =

Moldovan footballer

Personal information
- Full name: Sergiu Grițuc
- Date of birth: 6 April 1984 (age 42)
- Place of birth: Tiraspol, Moldavian SSR
- Height: 1.84 m (6 ft 1/2 in)
- Position: Striker

Team information
- Current team: FC Costuleni

Senior career*
Years	Team	Apps	(Gls)
2008–2009	CS Tiligul-Tiras Tiraspol	8	(1)
2009–2010	FC Olimpia	43	(6)
2010	CF Gagauziya	7	(0)
2010–2011	FC Nistru Otaci	17	(4)
2011–	FC Costuleni	7	(0)
- * Club domestic league appearances and goals as of 15 April 2013

Sergiu Grițuc (born 6 April 1984 in Tiraspol, Moldavian SSR) is a Moldavian football striker who plays for FC Costuleni.

== Club statistics ==
- Total matches played in Moldavian First League: 82 matches – 11 goals
