= Gabriel Stan =

Romanian footballer and manager

Personal information
- Date of birth: 25 June 1952 (age 74)
- Position: Midfielder

Senior career*
Years	Team	Apps	(Gls)
	Minerul Lupeni	–	(–)
1972–1977	Jiul Petroşani	–	(–)
1977–1981	Chimia Râmnicu Vâlcea	–	(–)
Total		283	(21)

International career
	Romania U-21	8	(–)
	Romania B	2	(–)

Managerial career
- 1982–1983: Tractorul Brașov
- 1988–1992: Metrom Brașov
- 1995: FC Brașov
- 1995–1996: Corvinul Hunedoara
- 1996–1999: Astra Ploieşti
- 1999: CSM Reșița
- 1999–2000: Jiul Petroșani
- 2000–2001: FC Brașov
- 2001: Astra Ploieşti
- 2001–2002: FC Brașov
- 2002–2003: Zimbru Chişinău
- 2004: FC Vaslui
- 2004–2005: FC Brașov
- 2005–2006: Minerul Lupeni
- 2006: FC Brașov
- 2007: Forex Braşov
- 2008: FCM Câmpina
- 2008: UTA Arad
- 2008–2009: Dunărea Călăraşi
- 2011: Unirea Alba Iulia
- 2011: Ursidos Chişinău
- 2011: Milsami-Ursidos
- 2024: SR Brașov
- * Club domestic league appearances and goals as of 20:26, 14 January 2024 (UTC)

Gabriel Stan (born 25 June 1952) is a Romanian football manager. He is sometimes nicknamed Gabello.

== Coaching career ==
=== Braşov ===
Stan is known as the last manager to qualify FC Brașov in a European competition. In the 2000–2001 Romanian Division A he managed with Braşov a third spot finish, thus qualifying to the UEFA Cup, where the club subsequently managed to meet with Internazionale Milano. However, because he had signed a contract with Astra Ploieşti in the season break, he did not lead the team in the European encounters.

He would resign from Astra Ploieşti and return to Braşov a few months later, from day 9 into the 2001–02 season, but then unluckily resign again in round 23, after a poor run of results.

=== Zimbru Chişinău ===
The following season, Stan was named as the new coach at Moldovan first division club Zimbru Chişinău, where he had the chance to lead the team in the European encounters of the 2002–03 UEFA Cup. In the qualifying round of the competition his team managed to pass the Swedish club IFK Göteborg, while in the first round of the competition they were eliminated by Real Betis.

His domestical achievements in that season were a second spot finish in the league and the winning of the Moldovan Cup, in a final against Nistru Otaci. In that season, Stan competed against another Romanian manager, Gabi Balint, that came out champion with Sheriff Tiraspol. Stan would resign from Zimbru the following season.

=== Vaslui then Braşov again and again ===
In the start of 2004 he takes on Vaslui in Romanian second division, but only manages to stay there for three months, leading the team in two matches, one defeat and one victory.

He returns to Braşov at the beginning of the 2004–05 season, to take over the team after a run of 5 matches without winning, but isn't able to recover it from under-performing and he is removed after the 20th round. The club relegates at the end of the season.

Two seasons later he is named again manager at Braşov, in round 10 of the 2006–07 second division, when the team stayed on the 9th position; but once again, for the fourth time, he is removed by the chairman in the winter break, to make way for a temporary manager that had to prepare the return of former manager Răzvan Lucescu at the end of the season. It was to be Braşov's lowest season classification in its history.

Only few months later, in April 2007, he takes over local rivals Forex Braşov where he is in charge for 10 rounds in the same division, taking the team from third spot to fourth, not meeting the objective of promoting to the first division. The club decided at that point not to extend his contract.

He was also in charge at the second division team Minerul Lupeni during the 2005–06 season.

=== 2008–2010 ===
On 18 March 2008, Stan was appointed at the struggling Liga I side UTA Arad, that was at the moment third from bottom and three points from safety. However, he resigns after only six rounds, on 14 April, following a 1–4 defeat at Politehnica Iaşi, when the difference from saving from relegation was 8 points, in matchday 29.

In the 2008–2009 season, Gabi Stan was named the head coach of third division's Dunărea Călăraşi, in a project that aimed promotion. Later into the season, after several conflicts regarding unpaid players, he decided to resign in round 23. At that moment the club was still fighting at the top of the table.

In the start of the year 2008, he was also related with a job at the club FCM Câmpina, but the deal did not reach to be completed.

During 2010, while not having a coaching contract, Gabriel Stan took on moderating local radio and TV shows about the football in Braşov.

=== 2011 ===
In 2011, he had another short spell at Unirea Alba Iulia, a relegation battler in the second division at the time. He resigned on 21 April, when the team was on the 14th spot, only to be officially announced the next day as the main coach of newly founded Moldovan second division club Ursidos Chişinău. Taking the team only from matchday 23, he managed to finish second in the league at the end of the season. Although the first placed club did not apply for a first division license, neither Ursidos were granted one and the club could not achieve promotion. However, ahead the start season, Ursidos Chişinău decided to merge with the first division club Milsami Orhei, forming Milsami-Ursidos. He was named main coach at the newly formed club, where he was in control until the end of the first half of the season, when his contract expired and he decided not to renew it.

At the time, he was returning to Moldovan football after 7 years. In an interview in 2010, he said that Zimbru and Braşov were his favourite teams and that he would train them for free at any time.

== Honours ==
=== Player ===
Jiul Petroşani

- Romanian Cup: 1973–74

=== Manager ===
Zimbru Chişinău

- Moldovan Cup: 2002–03
