= Serghei Botnaraș =

Moldovan footballer and manager

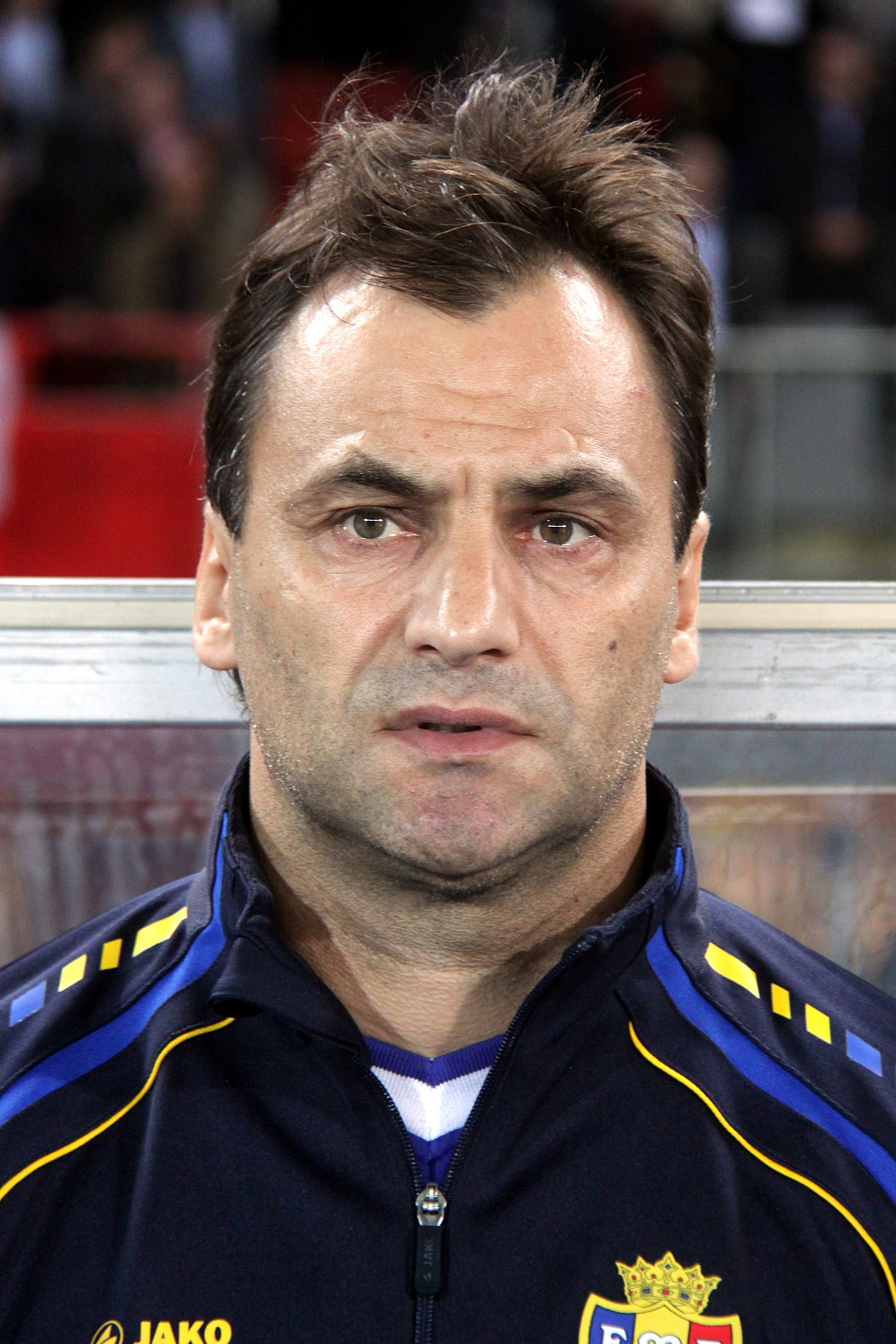
- Botnaraș in 2015

Personal information
- Date of birth: 27 February 1964 (age 62)
- Place of birth: Chișinău, Moldavian SSR, Soviet Union
- Height: 1.87 m (6 ft 2 in)
- Position: Goalkeeper

Team information
- Current team: Moldova U19 (goalkeeping coach)

Senior career*
Years	Team	Apps	(Gls)
1982–1983	Tiligul-Tiras Tiraspol	27	(0)
1984–1985	Zimbru Chișinău	3+40	(0)
1985	Zaria Bălți	4	(0)
1986	SK Odesa	4	(0)
1986–1996	Zimbru Chișinău	137	(1)

International career
1992	Moldova	1	(0)

Managerial career
- 2009–2010: Dacia Chișinău (interim)
- 2010: CF Găgăuzia
- 2011: Costuleni
- ?: Moldova U21 (goalkeeping coach)
- 2014–: Moldova (assistant)
- * Club domestic league appearances and goals

Serghei Botnaraș (born 27 February 1964) is a Moldovan football manager and former player who has played as goalkeeper.

== Career ==
From 2014 Botnaraș was the assistant coach of Moldova national team (under the rule of Alexandru Curteian), and previously has worked as goalkeepers coach of Moldova under-21, and was manager of Moldovan clubs CF Găgăuzia, FC Costuleni, and interim coach of Dacia Chișinău.

Botnaraș holds a UEFA A Manager License.

As footballer, he has played for Zimbru Chișinău in Divizia Națională and also played for Tiligul-Tiras Tiraspol, Zaria Bălți, and SK Odesa. He has played in a friendly match for Moldova in 1992, against Congo, won 3–1.
