= Nicolai Mincev =

Moldovan footballer

Personal information
- Date of birth: 20 October 1972 (age 54)
- Position: Defender

Senior career*
Years	Team	Apps	(Gls)
1994–1998	Tiligul Tiraspol		
1998–2001	FC Constructorul Chisinau		
2001–2003	FC Nistru Otaci		
2004	Tiligul Tiraspol		
2005	FC Semey		
2006–2008	FC Dacia Chişinău		
2008–2010	FC Nasaf		
2010–2011	FC Iskra-Stal		
2011–2012	FC Olimpia Bălți		
2013	FC Speranța Crihana Veche		
- * Club domestic league appearances and goals

Nicolai Mincev (born 20 October 1972) is a retired Moldovan football defender.
