= Vital Lyadzyanyow =

Belarusian footballer and agent

Vitali Ledenev Віталь Ледзянёў
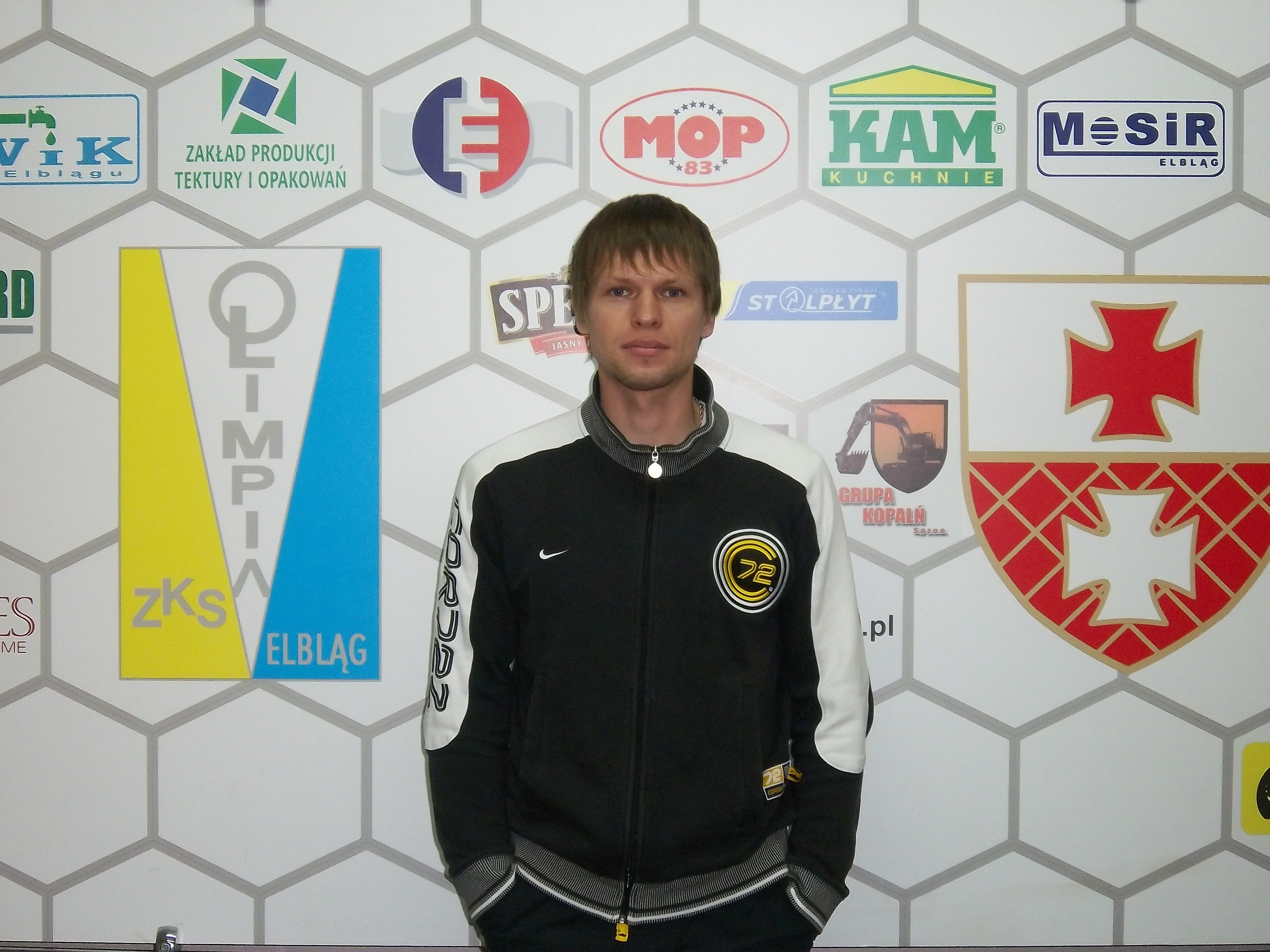

Personal information
- Date of birth: 26 March 1979 (age 47)
- Place of birth: Minsk, Soviet Union
- Height: 1.78 m (5 ft 10 in)
- Position: Forward

Youth career
- 1996–1998: Dinamo-Juni Minsk

Senior career*
Years	Team	Apps	(Gls)
1996–1998	Dinamo-Juni Minsk	27	(10)
1999–2005	Dinamo Minsk	74	(25)
2000	→ Dinamo-2 Minsk	6	(4)
2003	→ Torpedo-SKA Minsk (loan)	15	(2)
2005	→ Slavia Mozyr (loan)	9	(1)
2005	Maccabi Netanya	1	(0)
2005–2006	Hapoel Haifa	10	(0)
2006	Belshina Bobruisk	21	(4)
2007	MKT Araz	8	(0)
2007	Veras Nesvizh	8	(0)
2008	Maccabi Ahi Nazareth	16	(4)
2008	Banants	10	(6)
2009	MTZ-RIPO Minsk	8	(0)
2009–2010	Inter Baku	0	(0)
2010	Ulisses	0	(0)
2010	Dacia Chișinău	10	(2)
2011	Olimpia Elbląg	12	(3)
2011–2012	Gorodeya	2	(0)

International career
2000–2001	Belarus U21	15	(6)
- * Club domestic league appearances and goals

Vitali Ledenev (Belarusian: Віталь Ледзянёў; Russian: Виталий Леденёв; born 26 March 1979) is a Belarusian former professional footballer who played as a forward.

== Career ==
Born in Minsk, Lyadzyanyow played professionally in the Belarusian Premier League and Liga Leumit. He scored four goals in 16 appearances for Maccabi Ahi Nazareth F.C. during 2008.

In January 2011, he joined Olimpia Elbląg on a one-year contract.

Lyadzyanyow played for the Belarus national under-21 football team from 1996 to 1999.

== Honours ==
Dinamo Minsk

- Belarusian Premier League: 2004
- Belarusian Cup: 2002–03

Dacia Chișinău

- Moldovan National Division: 2010–11
