= Vitalie Manaliu =

Moldovan footballer

Personal information
- Date of birth: 23 March 1985 (age 41)
- Place of birth: Chișinău, Moldovan SSR
- Height: 1.81 m (5 ft 11 1/2 in)
- Position: Striker

Team information
- Current team: FC Iskra-Stal Rîbniţa
- Number: 14

Senior career*
Years	Team	Apps	(Gls)
2003–2005	FC Zimbru Chişinău	39	(11)
2005	FC Politehnica Chişinău	9	(1)
2006–2007	FC Zimbru Chişinău	7	(5)
2007–2008	CSCA-Steaua Chişinău	6	(0)
2008–	FC Iskra-Stal Rîbniţa	24	(2)

International career^{‡}
2006–2009	Moldova	4	(0)
- * Club domestic league appearances and goals ‡ National team caps and goals as of 14 September 2009

Vitalie Manaliu (born 23 March 1985 in Chișinău) is a Moldovan professional football player. As of 2009, he plays for FC Iskra-Stal Rîbniţa.
