= Andrian Cucovei =

Moldavan footballer

Personal information
- Date of birth: 21 April 1982 (age 44)
- Place of birth: Bălți, Moldovan SSR, USSR
- Height: 1.79 m (5 ft 10 in)
- Position: Defender

Youth career
- 1998–2001: FC Zimbru-2 Chișinău

Senior career*
Years	Team	Apps	(Gls)
2001–2006	Zimbru Chișinău	105	(0)
2007	Spartak-MZhK Ryazan	3	(0)
2008	Dacia Chișinău	3	(0)
2008–2009	Dunărea Călărași	0	(0)
2009–2010	Iskra-Stal Rîbnița	15	(1)
2010–2012	Milsami Orhei	39	(1)

International career^{‡}
2004	Moldova	2	(0)
- * Club domestic league appearances and goals as of 3 May 2017 ‡ National team caps and goals as of 3 May 2017

Andrian Cucovei (born 21 April 1982) is a former Moldovan footballer who played as defender.

== Honours ==
- Moldovan Cup: 2003-04, 2004–05
- Moldovan Supercup Runner-up: 2004, 2005
- Moldovan National Division Runner-up: 2003-04, 2006-07 (with Zimbru), 2007-08 (with Dacia)
