= Serghei Gafina =

Moldovan footballer

Personal information
- Date of birth: 10 November 1984 (age 42)
- Place of birth: Moldova
- Height: 1.78 m (5 ft 10 in)
- Position: Defender

Team information
- Current team: Dinamo-Auto Tiraspol
- Number: 30

Senior career*
| Years | Team | Apps | (Gls) |
| 2003–2005 | Unisport-Auto Chișinău | | |
| 2005–2011 | Iskra-Stal Rîbnița | 141 | (1) |
| 2012–2013 | Zimbru Chișinău | 13 | (0) |
| 2014–2020 | Iskra Rîbnița | | |
| 2020– | Dinamo-Auto Tiraspol | 18 | (0) |

International career
| 2010 | Moldova | 1 | (0) |
- * Club domestic league appearances and goals as of 11:39, 1 June 2021 (UTC)

Serghei Gafina (born 10 November 1984) is a Moldovan footballer who plays as a defender for Dinamo-Auto Tiraspol in the Moldovan National Division. He has previously played for Iskra-Stal Rîbnița, Zimbru Chișinău and Iskra Rîbnița.

== Club career ==
On 21 September 2020, Gafina joined FC Dinamo-Auto Tiraspol from FC Iskra Rîbnița, where he had served as team captain. Before his transfer, he had made six appearances in the Moldovan second division and national cup during the 2020–21 season, scoring three goals. He had also previously gained experience in the UEFA Europa League while playing for Iskra-Stal Rîbnița.
