= Victor Marian =

Moldovan footballer (born 1984)

Personal information
- Date of birth: 10 September 1984 (age 42)
- Place of birth: Chișinău, Moldova
- Height: 1.77 m (5 ft 9 1/2 in)
- Position: Midfielder

Team information
- Current team: FC Costuleni

Senior career*
| Years | Team | Apps | (Gls) |
| 2004–2005 | FC Unisport-Auto Chişinău | 12 | (0) |
| 2005–2006 | FC Nistru Otaci | 27 | (0) |
| 2007 | FC Politehnica Chişinău | 8 | (0) |
| 2008 | CSCA-Steaua Chişinău | 3 | (0) |
| 2008–2009 | AFC Rocar București | 0 | (0) |
| 2009–2010 | FC Viitorul Orhei | 23 | (2) |
| 2010– | FC Costuleni | 2 | (0) |

International career^{‡}
| 2009– | Moldova | 1 | (0) |
- * Club domestic league appearances and goals ‡ National team caps and goals as of 14 September 2009

Victor Marian (born 10 September 1984, in Chișinău) is a Moldovan professional football player. He plays for FC Costuleni of the Moldovan National Division.
