= Sergiu Zacon =

Moldovan footballer

Personal information
- Full name: Sergiu Zacon
- Date of birth: 13 November 1987 (age 38)
- Place of birth: Leova, Moldavian SSR
- Height: 1.75 m (5 ft 9 in)
- Position: Midfielder

Team information
- Current team: FC Nistru Otaci
- Number: 24

Youth career
- FC Prut Leova

Senior career*
Years	Team	Apps	(Gls)
2008–2011	FC Tighina	77	(8)
2011–2012	FC Iskra-Stal	12	(1)
2012–	FC Nistru Otaci	20	(2)
- * Club domestic league appearances and goals as of 15 April 2013

Sergiu Zacon (born 13 November 1987) is a Moldavian football striker who plays for FC Nistru Otaci.

== Club statistics ==
- Total matches played in Moldavian First League: 109 matches - 11 goals
