= Yuri Myrza =

Russian footballer

Personal information
- Full name: Yuri Dmitriyevich Myrza
- Date of birth: 9 July 1974 (age 52)
- Place of birth: Bendery, Moldovan SSR
- Height: 1.81 m (5 ft 11 1/2 in)
- Positions: Defender; midfielder

Senior career*
Years	Team	Apps	(Gls)
1993–1994	FC Sinteza Căuşani	25	(1)
1994–1996	Sportul Chişinău	38	(3)
1996–1998	FC Unisport-Auto Chişinău	31	(0)
1999–2001	Constructorul Chişinău	62	(3)
2001–2003	FC Nistru Otaci	62	(1)
2003	FC Lukoil Chelyabinsk	20	(0)
2004–2006	FC Politehnica Chişinău	36	(0)
2007	FC Dynamo Vologda	26	(1)
2008	FC Sibiryak Bratsk	27	(2)
2009	FC Taganrog	15	(0)
- * Club domestic league appearances and goals

Yuri Dmitriyevich Myrza (Russian: Юрий Дмитриевич Мырза, Romanian: Iurie Mirza; born 9 July 1974) is a former Moldovan professional football player.
