= Oleksandr Suchu =

Ukrainian footballer (born 1990)

Personal information
- Full name: Oleksandr Volodymyrovych Suchu
- Date of birth: 22 January 1990 (age 36)
- Place of birth: Sevastopol, Ukrainian SSR
- Height: 1.90 m (6 ft 3 in)
- Position: Striker

Team information
- Current team: Iskra-Stal

Youth career
- Sevastopol

Senior career*
Years	Team	Apps	(Gls)
2006–2009	Sevastopol	53	(12)
2010–	→ Sevastopol-2		
2011–	Iskra-Stal		
- * Club domestic league appearances and goals

Oleksandr Suchu (Ukrainian: Олександр Володимирович Сучу) (born 22 January 1990 in Sevastopol, Ukrainian SSR, Soviet Union, now Ukraine), is a Ukrainian footballer, who is currently playing for Moldovan club Iskra-Stal.

== Honors ==
- Iskra-Stal
  - Moldovan Cup: 2010–11
