= Volodymyr Kilikevych =

Ukrainian footballer

Personal information
- Full name: Volodymyr Volodymyrovych Kilikevych
- Date of birth: 30 November 1983 (age 42)
- Place of birth: Zhdanov, Ukrainian SSR, Soviet Union (now Mariupol, Ukraine)
- Height: 1.78 m (5 ft 10 in)
- Position: Striker

Youth career
- 1998–2000: Illichivets Mariupol

Senior career*
Years	Team	Apps	(Gls)
2000–2007	Illichivets Mariupol	36	(0)
2000–2007	→ Illichivets-2 Mariupol	83	(16)
2007	Oleksandriya	16	(2)
2007–2008	Oulun Pallo	15	(5)
2008–2009	TP-47		(3)
2009	Desna Chernihiv	6	(1)
2009–2012	Iskra-Stal Rîbniţa	43	(19)
2013–2014	Dinamo Samarqand		
2015	Narva Trans	32	(3)

International career^{‡}
2003	Ukraine U21	1	(0)

Managerial career
- 2020–2021: Yarud Mariupol
- * Club domestic league appearances and goals as of 31 December 2009 ‡ National team caps and goals as of 26 August 2010

Volodymyr Volodymyrovych Kilikevych (Ukrainian: Володимир Володимирович Кілікевич; born 30 November 1983) is a Ukrainian retired footballer and football manager.

== Playing career ==
In 2007, he signed a deal with the first-tier team PFC "Oleksandriya". He made his "professionals" debut on July 19, 2007, in a 2:0 home victory against CSKA of the capital in the first round. Volodymyr began the game, scored a goal in the 58th minute, and was replaced by Artem Tsymbal in the 82nd minute. He played in this club for one year. During this time, he played in sixteen matches in the First League and scored two goals. He also played 1 match (1 goal) in the Ukrainian Cup. Later, he was sold to the Finnish club "Oulun Palloseura" and then moved to another Finnish club TP-47, but in mid-2009, he terminated the contract and returned to Ukraine.

In Ukraine, he signed a contract with "Desna" and by September 2009, he had played in a total of six matches and scored one goal. At the end of 2009, he moved to the Moldovan club "Iskra-Stal" and played there until the end of 2012, during which time he played in forty-three matches and scored nineteen goals.

== Honours ==
Iskra-Stal Rîbniţa

- Moldovan Cup: 2010–11
- Divizia Națională: Runners-up: 2009–10

Individual

- Top scorer of Moldovan Cup: 2010–11
