= Andrei Tcaciuc =

Moldavan footballer

Personal information
- Full name: Andrei Tcaciuc
- Date of birth: 10 February 1982 (age 44)
- Place of birth: Bender, Moldavian SSR
- Height: 1.83 m (6 ft 0 in)
- Position: Midfielder

Team information
- Current team: FC Speranța Crihana Veche
- Number: 14

Senior career*
Years	Team	Apps	(Gls)
2008–2009	FC Nistru	20	(3)
2009–2011	FC Olimpia	61	(8)
2011–2012	FC Sfîntul Gheorghe	26	(1)
2012	FC Daugava	2	(1)
2012–	FC Speranța Crihana Veche	13	(0)
- * Club domestic league appearances and goals as of 15 July 2013

Andrei Tcaciuc (born 10 February 1982) is a Moldavian football midfielder who plays for FC Speranța Crihana Veche.

== Club statistics ==
- Total matches played in Moldavian First League: 117 matches – 12 goals
