= Christian Camacho =

American soccer player (born 1988)

Personal information
- Date of birth: July 11, 1988 (age 38)
- Place of birth: New York City, New York, United States
- Height: 1.76 m (5 ft 9 in)
- Position: Midfielder

Team information
- Current team: New Amsterdam
- Number: 6

Youth career
- 2005–2006: FC Zaria Bălți

Senior career*
Years	Team	Apps	(Gls)
2007	Brooklyn Knights	3	(0)
2008	Westchester Flames	10	(0)
2010–2011	FC Zaria Bălți	34	
2011–2012	FC Sfântul Gheorghe	35	(2)
2014–2015	Dayton Dutch Lions	10	(0)
2016–2017	F.A. Euro	22	(0)
2020–	New Amsterdam	15	(0)
- * Club domestic league appearances and goals as of September 12, 2014

Christian Camacho (born July 11, 1988) is an American soccer player of Colombian descent who currently plays for New Amsterdam FC in the National Independent Soccer Association.

== Career ==
Camacho left the United States in 2005 to play in Moldova with FC Zaria Bălți, before returning to the US to play with USL PDL clubs Brooklyn Knights and Westchester Flames.

Camacho returned to Moldova, again with FC Zaria Bălți, before transferring to FC Sfântul Gheorghe in 2011.

On August 13, 2014, Camacho signed with USL Pro club Dayton Dutch Lions.
