= FC Ursidos Chișinău =

FC Ursidos Chişinău
- Full name: Fotbal Club Ursidos Chişinău
- Nickname(s): White Bears
- Founded: 2010
- Dissolved: 2011 (Merged with FC Milsami)
- Ground: CPSM, Vadul lui Vodă
- Capacity: 1,000
- League: Moldovan "A" Division
- 2010–11: 2nd
Home colours	Away colours

FC Ursidos Chişinău is a defunct Moldovan football club from Chişinău, Moldova. They were founded in 2010 and played for a season in the 2010–11 Moldovan "A" Division, the second division in Moldovan football.

== History ==
The aim for their first season was promotion to the Moldovan National Division, but they finished in second place in the 2010–11 Moldovan "A" Division, with champions being Locomotiv Bălţi, who did not apply for a National Division license. Despite this, second-placed Ursidos were not allowed to play in the first division, after they could not meet requirements for the National Division license, due to not having their own stadium. In the 2011–12 season, they merged with FC Milsami Orhei and formed FC Milsami-Ursidos Orhei.

=== League results ===
Season	Div.	Pos.	Pl.	W	D	L	GS	GA	P	Cup	Top Scorer (League)	Head Coach
2010–11	2nd	2_{/15}	28	16	10	2	63	17	58	Round of 8		(Romania) Gabriel Stan

== See also ==
- FC Milsami Orhei
