= Denis Kravtsov =

Russian footballer (born 1990)

Personal information
- Full name: Denis Viktorovich Kravtsov
- Date of birth: 18 March 1990 (age 36)
- Place of birth: Ulan-Ude, Russian SFSR
- Height: 1.78 m (5 ft 10 in)
- Position: Midfielder

Youth career
- FC FShM Torpedo Moscow

Senior career*
Years	Team	Apps	(Gls)
2006	FC Torpedo Moscow	0	(0)
2008–2009	FC Amkar Perm	0	(0)
2010–2011	FC Sfântul Gheorghe Suruceni	14	(1)
2011–2012	FC Amur-2010 Blagoveshchensk	20	(1)
2013	FC Podolye Podolsky district	9	(0)
2014–2015	FC Chayka Korolyov		
2015	FC Olimpik Mytishchi		
2016–2018	FC Sergiyev Posad		
- * Club domestic league appearances and goals

Denis Viktorovich Kravtsov (Russian: Денис Викторович Кравцов; born 18 March 1990) is a Russian former football midfielder.

== Club career ==
He made his debut in the Russian Second Division for FC Amur-2010 Blagoveshchensk on 7 September 2011 in a game against FC KUZBASS Kemerovo.
