= Sandro Shugladze =

Ukrainian footballer (born 1990)

Personal information
- Full name: Sandro Davydovych Shugladze
- Date of birth: 24 October 1990 (age 36)
- Place of birth: Terjola, Georgian SSR
- Height: 1.74 m (5 ft 8 1/2 in)
- Positions: Midfielder; forward

Team information
- Current team: FC Zimbru Chișinău

Youth career
- 2003–2007: PFC Sevastopol

Senior career*
Years	Team	Apps	(Gls)
2007–2008	PFC Sevastopol	8	(0)
2008–2011	PFC Sevastopol-2	15	(0)
2011–2013	FC Iskra-Stal Rîbniţa	59	(5)
2013–	FC Sapovnela Terjola	54	(8)
- * Club domestic league appearances and goals

Sandro Shugladze, (Сандро Давидович Шуґладзе, born 24 October 1990 in Terjola, Georgian SSR, Soviet Union), is a Ukrainian footballer, currently playing for FC Zimbru Chișinău.

== Personal life ==
The Ukrainian midfielder has Georgian roots.
