= Adrian Grigoruță =

Romanian footballer

Personal information
- Date of birth: 8 August 1983 (age 43)
- Place of birth: Romania
- Positions: Midfielder; winger

Senior career*
Years	Team	Apps	(Gls)
- CSM Ceahlăul Piatra Neamț
- FC Botoșani
- FC Prefab 05 Modelu
- SCM Râmnicu Vâlcea
2008–2010	CSM Deva		(6)
2010–2012	FC Milsami Orhei	58	(13)
2012	FC Okzhetpes	10	(3)
2013–2014	Hapoel Afula F.C	5	(0)
2014	FC Milsami Orhei	4	(0)
2015–2016	SR Brașov	4	(0)
2016–2018	FC Avenches		
Total		81	(22)
- * Club domestic league appearances and goals

Adrian Grigoruță (born 8 August 1983 in Romania) is a Romanian retired footballer.

== Career ==
After failing to achieve promotion to the Romanian top flight with CSM Ceahlăul Piatra Neamț, Botoșani, Prefab 05 Modelu, SCM Râmnicu Vâlcea, and CSM Deva, Grigoruță signed for Moldovan outfit Milsami Orhei, where he earned a place in the 2010/11 team of the season in the left winger position.

For the second half of 2015/16, he joined Romanian second division side SR Brașov after playing in the Thai lower leagues, Israel, and Kazakhstan.

Following his stint with SR Brașov, Grigoruță played in the Swiss lower leagues.
