= Viktor Uzbek =

Ukrainian footballer (born 1990)

Personal information
- Full name: Viktor Serhiyovych Uzbek
- Date of birth: 22 February 1990 (age 36)
- Place of birth: Ukrainian SSR
- Height: 1.77 m (5 ft 9 1/2 in)
- Position: Defender

Team information
- Current team: Iskra-Stal
- Number: 24

Senior career*
Years	Team	Apps	(Gls)
2006–2010	PFC Sevastopol	2	(0)
2008–2009	→ PFC Sevastopol-2 (loan)	19	(0)
2010–	Iskra-Stal	17	(1)
- * Club domestic league appearances and goals as of 29 January 2010

Viktor Uzbek (Ukrainian: Віктор Сергійович Узбек) (born 22 February 1990) is a professional Ukrainian football who plays for Moldovan club FC Iskra-Stal.

== Career ==
Uzbek turned professional and played two games for PFC Sevastopol in the Ukrainian First League.
