= Daniil Nikolayev (footballer, born 1991) =

Russian footballer

Personal information
- Full name: Daniil Aleksandrovich Nikolayev
- Date of birth: 14 October 1991 (age 35)
- Place of birth: Moscow, Russian SFSR
- Height: 1.83 m (6 ft 0 in)
- Position: Forward

Youth career
- FC Academia Chişinău

Senior career*
| Years | Team | Apps | (Gls) |
| 2009–2011 | FC Academia Chişinău | 48 | (19) |
| 2011 | FC Vostok | 8 | (1) |
| 2011–2013 | FC Zimbru Chișinău | 19 | (3) |
| 2013 | FC Dolgoprudny | 8 | (0) |
| 2014 | FC Khimki | 3 | (0) |
- * Club domestic league appearances and goals

Daniil Aleksandrovich Nikolayev (Russian: Даниил Александрович Николаев; born 14 October 1991) is a former Russian football forward.

== Club career ==
He made his debut in the Russian Second Division for FC Dolgoprudny on 4 September 2013 in a game against FC Dnepr Smolensk.

== Club statistics ==
- Total matches played in Moldavian First League: 67 matches – 22 goals
