= Giga Mamulashvili =

Russian footballer

Personal information
- Full name: Giga Teymurazovich Mamulashvili
- Date of birth: 2 October 1991 (age 35)
- Place of birth: Tbilisi, Georgia
- Height: 1.82 m (6 ft 0 in)
- Position: Forward

Youth career
- –2007: DYuSSh-57 Perovets-Novokosino Moscow
- 2007–2009: Rinat Dasayev DFA Moscow

Senior career*
Years	Team	Apps	(Gls)
2009–2010	DFA Moscow		
2010–2011	FC Tiraspol	21	(5)
2011–2012	FC Dnepr Smolensk	13	(3)
2013–2015	FC Volga Tver	59	(8)
2016	FC Veles Moscow (amateur)		
2016–2017	FC Shukura Kobuleti	25	(0)
2019	SSh Sergiyev Posad-ZTZ Sergiyev Posad		
- * Club domestic league appearances and goals

Giga Teymurazovich Mamulashvili (Russian: Гига Теймуразович Мамулашвили; born 2 October 1991) is a Russian former professional football player of Georgian descent.
