= Mihail Paseciniuc =

Moldavan footballer

Personal information
- Full name: Mihail Paseciniuc
- Date of birth: 9 March 1991 (age 35)
- Place of birth: Tiraspol, Moldova
- Height: 1.72 m (5 ft 7 1/2 in)
- Position: Midfielder

Team information
- Current team: Dinamo-Auto Tiraspol
- Number: 17

Youth career
- Tiligul-Tiras

Senior career*
Years	Team	Apps	(Gls)
2007–2009	Tiligul-Tiras	27	(2)
2009–2011	FC Olimpia Bălți	54	(6)
2011–2012	FC Volga Nizhny Novgorod	0	(0)
2012–2013	FC Olimpia Bălți	7	(1)
2013–2014	FC Milsami Orhei	8	(0)
2014	Dinamo-Auto Tiraspol	8	(1)
2014–2015	FC Saxan	2	(0)
2015–	Dinamo-Auto Tiraspol	8	(0)

International career
2011	Moldova U21	2	(0)
- * Club domestic league appearances and goals as of 17:20, 7 December 2015 (UTC)

Mihail Paseciniuc (born 9 March 1991) is a Moldovan footballer who plays for Dinamo-Auto Tiraspol in Moldovan National Division as a midfielder. He has represented his country at under-21 international level.

== Club career ==
He started his professional career in Tiraspol club "Tiligul-Tiras" for which spent 27 games and scored two goals. June 6, 2009 the club because of financial problems ceased to exist, and Paseciniuc moved to the "Olympia" from Balti, leased base "Tiligul" to prepare players. For a new club in the Championship of Moldova debuted July 25, 2009 in a game with Chisinau "CSKA-Rapid", coming on 83 minutes, instead of Julius Adaramola. February 27, 2010 at the 63rd minute of the match with Tiraspol "Sheriff" scored his first goal for the "Olympia", thereby bringing victory to his team. As part of the Balti club in the championship Paseciniuc won the bronze medal, which made it possible for the next year to perform in the European League . In the 2010/11 season, Mikhail took part in all the matches of his team, and the official site of UEFA found him the best young player of Moldova. In early July 2011 was supposed to go to Nizhny Novgorod "Volga" in the camp in Austria, but he had problems with visa. In this regard, the team arrived July 19, and after successful completion of viewing July 25 it had signed a contract for five years .

== International career ==
He played for the youth team of Moldova in the first qualifying round of the European football championship among boys under 19 years old in 2010, the game which took place in Luxembourg. In the first match October 7, 2009 with Turkey Mikhail came in the 70th minute on the field instead of Radu Gynsarya. In the other two matches of the tournament against Germany and Luxembourg and went to the second-half substitute. Moldova's national team eventually won the third place in the group, which did not allow her to go to the next round of qualifying. February 8, 2011 played the first match for the youth team of Moldova, coming on 62 minutes into the friendly match with Belarus instead Radu Gynsarya. March 17, 2011 was invited by head coach Gavril Balint to the national team in the qualifying match of Euro 2012 against Sweden, but the match did not participate.

== Honours ==
Bronze medalist of Moldova : 2009/10 Best young player of Moldova according to the official website of UEFA : 2011
