= Julius Adaramola =

Nigerian footballer (born 1990)

Personal information
- Full name: Julius Olumide Adaramola
- Date of birth: 4 April 1990 (age 36)
- Place of birth: Nigeria
- Height: 1.77 m (5 ft 10 in)
- Position: Midfielder

Team information
- Current team: Råde
- Number: 11

Senior career*
Years	Team	Apps	(Gls)
2009–2012	Olimpia Bălți	178	(13)
2013	→ Fredrikstad (loan)	29	(4)
2014–2015	Fredrikstad	47	(2)
2016–	Råde		
- * Club domestic league appearances and goals

Julius Adaramola (born 4 April 1990) is a Nigerian footballer who plays for Råde IL. Previously Adaramola played for Olimpia Bălți and Fredrikstad FK.

== Career ==
=== Club ===
In the 2010–2011 season, he played all four qualification games in the UEFA Europa League for Olimpia and scored one goal, and is therefore the club's highest scoring and most playing player, along with others.

In the summer of 2013, Adaramola signed a permanent deal with FFK, after external pressure from the public and the environment.

In May 2016, Adaramola joined Råde IL, signing a new three-year contract with Råde in July 2017.
