= Evgheni Gorodețchi =

Moldovan footballer

Personal information
- Date of birth: 24 September 1985 (age 41)
- Place of birth: Dnestrovsc, Moldovan SSR, Soviet Union
- Height: 1.75 m (5 ft 9 in)
- Position: Midfielder

Senior career*
Years	Team	Apps	(Gls)
2003–2004	Sheriff Tiraspol	1	(0)
2004–2007	Tiraspol	75	(6)
2007–2009	Sheriff Tiraspol	33	(11)
2009–2010	Tiraspol	12	(0)
2010–2013	Iskra-Stal Rîbnița	65	(16)
2013–2014	Dinamo-Auto Tiraspol	35	(4)
2015	Anapa		
- * Club domestic league appearances and goals

Evgheni Gorodețchi (Russian: Евгений Городецкий; born 24 September 1985) is a Moldovan former footballer who played as a midfielder.

== Career ==
Born in Dnestrovsc, Gorodețchi started his career with Sheriff Tiraspol in the 2003–04 season. After only making one appearance for the team, he instead joined neighbouring FC Tiraspol, where he stayed for three seasons. In 2007, he moved back to Sheriff Tiraspol, before returning to FC Tiraspol in 2009. He later played for Iskra-Stal Rîbnița, Dinamo-Auto Tiraspol and Russian side Anapa.
