= FC Rapid Ghidighici (2005–2008) =

Rapid Ghidighici
- Full name: FC Rapid Ghidighici
- Founded: 2005
- Dissolved: 2008
- Ground: Stadionul Ghidighici; Ghidighici, Moldova
- Capacity: 1,500
- League: Divizia Naţională
- 2007–08: 12th (relegated)

FC Rapid Ghidighici was a Moldova Republic football club based in Ghidighici. They played in the Divizia Naţională, the top division in Moldova Republic football. It was founded in 2005 in the 'A' Division. FC Rapid is the ex Steaua Chişinău which quit the professional game due to financial difficulties. In summer 2008 it merged with CSCA Chişinău to create CSCA-Rapid Chişinău.
