= CF Intersport-Aroma Cobusca Nouă =

Moldovan football club

Intersport-Aroma
- Full name: CF Intersport-Aroma Cobusca Nouă
- Founded: 2000
- Dissolved: 2017
- Ground: Cobusca Nouă; Anenii Noi, Moldova
- Capacity: 500
- 2016–17: Divizia A, 14th of 15 (withdrew)

CF Intersport-Aroma Cobusca Nouă was a Moldovan football club based in Cobusca Nouă, Anenii Noi, Moldova. They played in the Divizia A, the second tier of Moldovan football. In the 2011–12 season, Intersport-Aroma placed 4th in the league. This was the best result in their history.
