= Cobusca Nouă =

- Commune
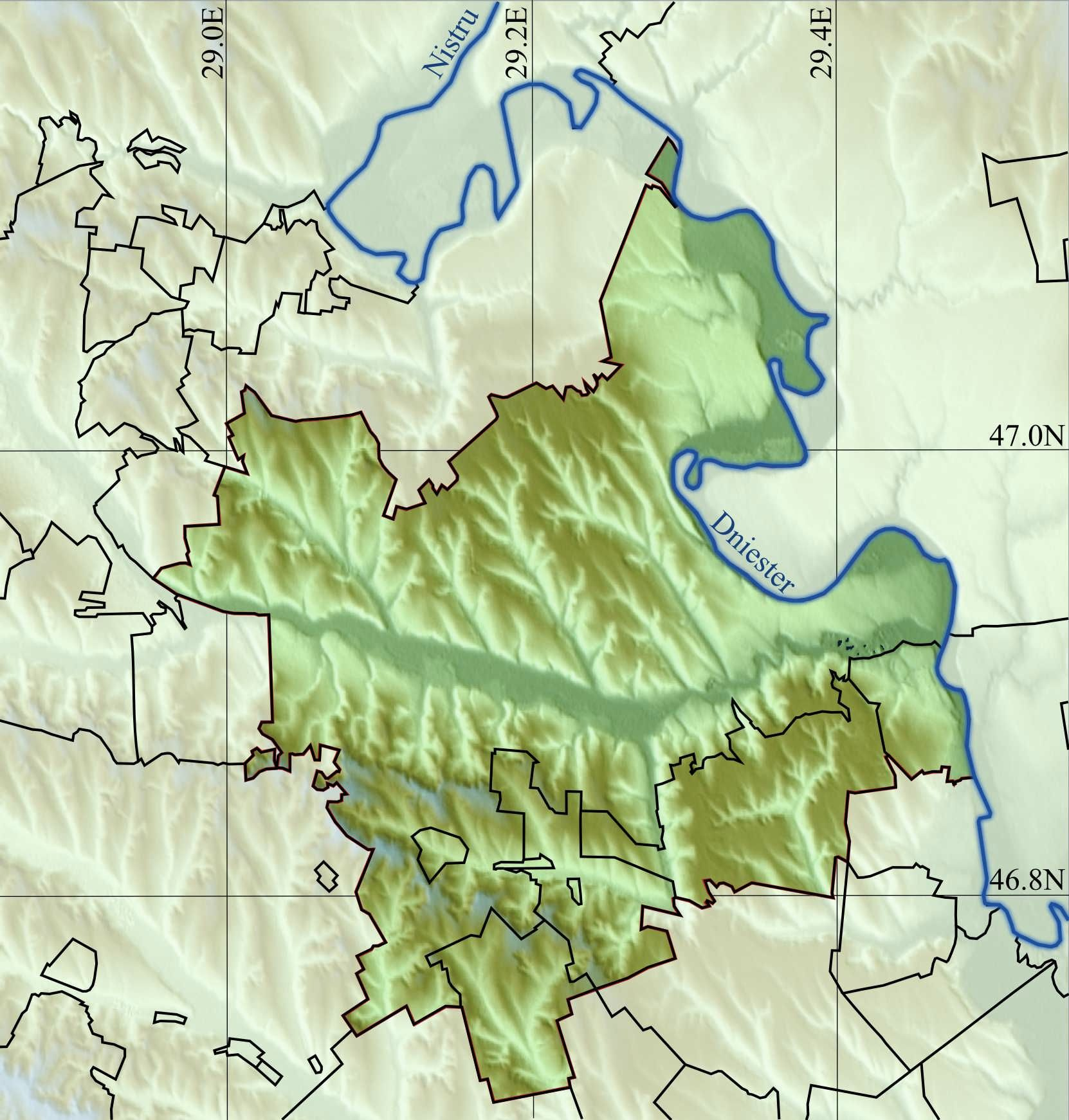
- Location within Anenii Noi District Location within Moldova
- Coordinates: 46°56′N 29°12′E
- Country: Moldova
- District: Anenii Noi District

Population (2014 census)
  - Total: 1,488
- Time zone: UTC+2 (EET)
  - Summer (DST): UTC+3 (EEST)

Cobusca Nouă is a village in the Anenii Noi District of Moldova.
