= FC Bălți-2 =

Bălți-2
- Full name: Fotbal Club Bălți-2
- Founded: 1994
- Ground: Stadionul Orășenesc, Bălți, Moldova
- Capacity: 7,000
- League: Liga 2
- 2024–25: Liga 2, North Series, 8th of 12
Home colours	Away colours

FC Bălți-2 is the reserve team of FC Bălți. They play in Liga 2, the third tier of Moldovan football.

== History ==
Until 2011, the club was called "FC Olimpia-2 Tiligul". After that, it was called FC Olimpia 2 and now FC Zaria-2.

== Honours ==
- Divizia B

Winners (1): 1994–95
