= FC Costuleni =

Association football club in Moldova

Costuleni
- Full name: Fotbal Club Costuleni
- Founded: 1 June 2008
- Dissolved: 20 November 2014
- Ground: Complexul Sportiv Raional Orhei; Orhei, Moldova
- Capacity: 2,539
- 2013–14: Divizia Naţională, 7th of 12
Home colours	Away colours

FC Costuleni was a Moldovan football club based in Costuleni, Ungheni, Moldova. They played in the Divizia Naţională, the top division in Moldovan football.

== History ==
The club participated for the first time in the "B" Division (North) in the 2008–09 season and won it.

In 2009–10, FC Costuleni won the "A" Division and promoted to the highest tier of Moldovan football Moldovan National Division.

After few months spent at Rapid Ghidighici, on 24 June 2013 Italian businessman Pietro Belardelli acquired FC Costuleni from Iurie Chirinciuc at a symbolic price of one Moldovan leu. Former owner Iurie Chirinciuc had to be the club's honorary president, and Pietro Belardelli to manage and finance the club. However, after few months Belardelli wasn't anymore interested in managing FC Costuleni and Iurie Chirinciuc re-took the ownership over the club.

At the end November 2014, FC Costuleni has been withdrawn from the championship after 12 matches played, the newly appointed club's president, Andrei Grigor, reasoning the decision by the fact that the team will not succeed to achieve its objectives to accede in European competitions by the end of the season. The club's honorary president, Iurie Chirinciuc, has stated that the team has financial problems, and added that "FC Costuleni doesn't disappear, but just has been withdrawn from the championship".

== Achievements ==
- Divizia A
  - Winners (1): 2009–10
- Divizia B
  - Winners (1): 2008–09

== League results ==
Season	Div.	Pos.	Pl.	W	D	L	GS	GA	P	Cup	Europe	Top Scorer (League)	Head Coach
2008–09	3rd "North"	1	22	20	2	0	86	6	62	Second round	—		(Moldova) Ilie Vieru
2009–10	2nd	1	30	24	2	4	90	27	74	First round	—		(Moldova) Ilie Vieru
2010–11	1st	10	39	7	6	26	23	68	27	Round of 16	—	(Moldova) Eduard Tomașcov (7)	(Moldova) Ilie Vieru (Moldova) Igor Ursachi (Oct 24, 2010 – Feb 22, 2011) (Moldova) Serghei Botnaraș
2011–12	1st	12	33	3	11	19	19	54	20	Second round	—	(Turkey) Yakup Sertkaya (2)	(Moldova) Serghei Botnaraș (Bulgaria) Velizar Popov (July 1, 2011 – April 3, 2012) (Moldova) Marcel Reșitca
2012–13	1st	8	33	9	11	13	38	48	38	Round of 16	—	(Moldova) Vadim Cemîrtan (12)	(Moldova) Vitalie Mostovoi (July 1, 2012 – Jan 19, 2013) (Moldova) Lilian Popescu (Jan 22, 2013 – July 30, 2013) (Romania) Marian Pană (July 25, 2013 – Aug 13, 2013) (Moldova) Lilian Popescu (Aug 13, 2013–)
