= Locomotiva Bălți =

- Full name: Clubul de Fotbal Locomotiv Bălți
- Nickname: Feroviari
- Founded: 1940 refounded 2005
- Ground: Locomotiv; Bălți, Moldova
- Capacity: 1000
- Manager: Ion Cuptov
- League: Moldovan "A" Division 11 th

Locomotiva Bălți is a football club in Bălți, Republic of Moldova growing up Moldovan "A" Division. In 2011 Locomotiva Balti became the winner of the national championship football season 2010–2011, Division A. She came in first place after having accumulated 59 points Cretu, Angela. Balti won the tournament Locomotive Division. observator.md, June 6, 2011. Retrieved June 14, 2011. Thus, given the right to play in Moldovan National Division, but has not submitted the file to the license and will play another season in league two New National Division football season will begin on July 23. jurnalsport.md, June 8, 2011. Retrieved June 14, 2011. .

== Achievements ==
- Divizia A: 1

2010–11

- Divizia B: 1

2006–07
