= FC Iskra-Stal =

Iskra-Stal Rîbnița
- Full name: Football Club Iskra-Stal Rîbnița
- Nickname: The Steelmakers
- Founded: 2005; 21 years ago
- Dissolved: 2013; 13 years ago
- Ground: Gorodskoi Stadium
- Capacity: 4,500
- Chairman: Ilia Freidchin
- League: Moldovan "B" Division
- 2013–14: 2012–13, 9th
- Website: iskra-stal.com
Home colours	Away colours

FC Iskra-Stal Rîbnița was a Moldovan football club based in Rîbnița, Moldova (Transnistria).

== History ==
FC Iskra-Stal (Rîbnița) was founded in 2005 by merging an amateur team Stal that was owned by the metallurgical plant in Rîbnița, with the local team "Iskra", that was competing in the Moldovan "A" Division. In the 2005–2006 season Iskra-Stal took the second place in the "A" championship of Moldova and won a ticket for the national premier division. Head coach of this achievement was Vasily Raiko.

In the 2006–2007 season Iskra-Stal debuted in the National Division and finished 9th from 10 teams. Head coach was Serghei Sîrbu.

In 2007 the club was transformed into an autonomous non-profit organization "FC Iskra-Stal".

In the 2007–2008 season Iskra-Stal concluded the championship on 6th place among 11 teams and became one of the stronger teams in National Division. Head coach Vlad Goian was replaced by Victor Baryshev.

In the 2008–2009 season, Iskra-Stal for the first time in the history of the football in Ribnita, won the bronze medals in the championship of Moldova (3rd place) and won the right to take part in games Europa League. Some of the players of the squad in that season played in the National team of Moldova: Artur Ioniță, Serghei Alexeev, Vitali Manaliu.

In the 2009–2010 season Iskra-Stal won the silver medal (2nd place) in the National Division and for the second time received the right to participate in the Europa League.

In 2011 Iskra-Stal participated in the CIS Cup, held in St. Petersburg. The team played in Group A along with the Inter Baku, Istiqlol Dushanbe and Neftchi Kochkor. Iskra-Stal took third place, earning 4 points in the group.

At the end of the 2010–2011 season Iskra-Stal won the Moldovan Cup, winning the first trophy in its history, and qualifying for the third consecutive time into Europa League. After financial problems after the 2012/2013 season, the club was relegated to the Moldovan Second division.

== Honours ==
- Divizia Națională
  - Runners-up: 2009–10
- Moldovan Cup
  - Winners: 2010–11
- Moldovan Super Cup:
  - Runners-up: 2011

== European record ==
UEFA Europa League

Season	Round	Opponents	Home leg	Away leg	Aggregate
2009–10	2Q	(Bulgaria) Cherno More Varna	0–3	0–1	0–4
2010–11	2Q	(Sweden) Elfsborg	0–1	1–2	1–3
2011–12	2Q	(Croatia) NK Varaždin	1–1	1–3	2–4

Commonwealth of Independent States Cup

Season	Round	Opponents	Score
2011	Group stage	(Tajikistan) Esteghlal Dushanbe	1–1
2011	Group stage	(Kyrgyzstan) Neftchi Kochkor-Ata	1–0
2011	Group stage	(Azerbaijan) Inter Baku	0–1

== List of seasons ==
Season	League									Cup	Ref
Season	Division	Pos	Pld	W	D	L	GF	GA	Pts	Cup	Ref
2002–03	Divizia A	5th	26	14	4	8	40	22	46	—N/a	
2003–04	Divizia A	14th	30	7	7	16	31	62	28	—N/a	
2004–05	Divizia A	9th	30	9	9	12	27	40	36	—N/a	
2005–06	Divizia A	↑ 4th	28	17	7	4	54	31	58	—N/a	
2006–07	Divizia Națională	9th	36	6	13	17	22	43	31	First round	
2007–08	Divizia Națională	6th	30	9	8	13	23	34	35	Second round	
2008–09	Divizia Națională	3rd	30	14	10	6	28	15	52	Quarter-finals	
2009–10	Divizia Națională	2nd	33	19	8	6	50	25	65	Semi-finals	
2010–11	Divizia Națională	5th	39	21	11	7	62	26	74	Winners	
2011–12	Divizia Națională	7th	33	11	7	15	41	48	40	Round of 16	
2012–13	Divizia Națională	9th	33	10	8	15	37	55	38	Quarter-finals	

== Managers ==
- (Moldova) Serghei Sîrbu (June 2006 – June 7)
- (Moldova) Vlad Goian (Jan 2008 – Dec 10)
- (Moldova) Iurie Blonari (Jan 2011 – Nov 12)
- (Moldova) Veaceslav Rusnac (Nov 2012–)

== Notable players ==
- (Ukraine) Volodymyr Kilikevych
- (Ukraine) Mykyta Gavrylenko
