= 1996–97 Moldovan Cup =

Cupa Moldovei

Tournament details
- Country: Moldova

Final positions
- Champions: Zimbru
- Runners-up: Nistru

The 1996–97 Moldovan Cup was the sixth season of the Moldovan annual football cup competition. The competition ended with the final held on 14 May 1997.

== Round of 32 ==
Team 1	Score	Team 2
Olimpia	8–0	Tiras
Lactis	0–3	MHM-93
Codru	1–2	Tebas
Attila	2–1	Stimold
Tiligul	2–0	Vierul
Viișoara	2–3	Unisport
Nistru	6–1	Sindicat
Dinamo	7–1	Spicul
Spumante	2–1	Raut
Roma	1–0	Constructorul
Tvardita	0–1	Ciuhur
Haiduc	2–4	Locomotiva
Speranța	3–0	Olimpia-2
Moldova	1–2	Agro
Migdal	0–3	Zimbru
Dumbrava	w/o	Victoria

== Round of 16 ==
Team 1	Agg.	Team 2	1st leg	2nd leg
Speranța	5–2	Dinamo	2–1	3–1
Dumbrava	2–2 (a)	Spumante	0–1	2–1
Ciuhur	2–0	Unisport	2–0	0–0
Nistru	8–1	Tebas	4–0	4–1
Attila	0–5	Roma	0–4	0–1
Olimpia	6–1	Agro	4–0	2–1
Zimbru	6–2	MHM-93	5–2	1–0
Locomotiva	2–7	Tiligul	1–2	1–5

== Quarter-finals ==
The first legs were played on 9 March 1997. The second legs were played on 2 April 1997.

Team 1	Agg.	Team 2	1st leg	2nd leg
Nistru	0–0 (5–4 p)	Roma	0–0	0–0
Olimpia	8–1	Ciuhur	4–0	4–1
Tiligul	10–1	Dumbrava	9–0	1–1
Speranța	1–2	Zimbru	1–1	0–1

== Semi-finals ==
The first legs were played on 16 April 1997. The second legs were played on 30 April 1997.

Team 1	Agg.	Team 2	1st leg	2nd leg
Tiligul	2–4	Zimbru	2–3	0–1
Nistru	2–1	Olimpia	1–0	1–1 (a.e.t.)

== Final ==
14 May 1997

Zimbru	0–0 (a.e.t.)	Nistru
	Report
Penalties
Toloconnicov (penalty scored); Testemițanu (penalty scored); Spînu (penalty scored); Epureanu (penalty scored); Culibaba (penalty scored); Boreț (penalty scored); D. Caras (penalty scored)	7–6	(penalty scored) Podgaețki; (penalty scored) Șumilo; (penalty scored) Popescu; (penalty scored) Stratulat; (penalty scored) Somic; (penalty scored) Șablevski; (penalty missed) Guzun

Stadionul Republican, Chișinău
Attendance: 8,000
Referee: Valeriu Sorochin
