= 1992 Moldovan National Division =

Moldovan National Division
- Season: 1992
- Champions: Zimbru Chișinău
- Relegated: Constructorul Leova
- Matches: 132
- Goals: 357 (2.7 per match)
- Top goalscorer: Serghei Alexandrov

Divizia Naţională 1992 is the first edition of Moldovan Divizia Naţională since independence.

The league was a double round-robin tournament. The season takes less than a year in order to change the league to become a summer league. Only 12 teams participated.

== Teams ==
Club	City	Stadium	1991 season
Amocom Chișinău	Chișinău		
Bugeac Comrat	Comrat		3rd in Soviet Second League B, Zone 5
Constructorul Chișinău	Chișinău		
Constructorul Leova	Leova		
Cristalul Făleşti	Făleşti		
Dinamo Codru Chișinău	Chișinău		
Moldova Boroşeni	Boroseni		
Olimpia Bălţi	Bălţi		14th in Soviet Second League - West Group
Speranţa Nisporeni	Nisporeni		
Tighina	Tighina		9th in Soviet Second League - West Group
Tiligul Tiraspol	Tiraspol		2nd in Soviet First League
Zimbru Chișinău	Chișinău		19th in Soviet First League

== Final classification ==
Pos	Team	Pld	W	D	L	GF	GA	GD	Pts	Qualification or relegation
1	Zimbru Chișinău (C)	22	15	5	2	40	15	+25	35	Playoffs (Note: Title awarded to Zimbru because Tiligul refused to play the playoff game.)
2	Tiligul Tiraspol	22	15	5	2	40	13	+27	35	Playoffs
3	Bugeac Comrat	22	13	7	2	51	11	+40	33	
4	FC Tighina	22	9	8	5	21	17	+4	26	
5	Amocom Chișinău	22	9	7	6	32	25	+7	25	
6	Constructorul Chișinău	22	8	7	7	46	32	+14	23	
7	Dinamo Codru Chișinău	22	8	5	9	30	23	+7	21	
8	Speranţa Nisporeni	22	6	5	11	20	32	−12	17	
9	Olimpia Bălți	22	5	7	10	19	24	−5	17	
10	Moldova Boroseni	22	7	2	13	22	42	−20	16	
11	Cristalul Fălești	22	3	3	16	25	60	−35	9	
12	Constructorul Leova (R)	22	2	3	17	11	63	−52	7	Relegation to Division "A"

Source: rsssf.com
(C) Champions; (R) Relegated

== Results ==
Home \ Away	AMO	BUG	CCH	CLE	CFĂ	DCC	MBO	OLI	SPE	TIG	TIL	ZIM
Amocom Chișinău		0–2	2–2	2–0	3–0	0–0	6–0	2–0	2–1	1–1	1–1	1–2
Bugeac Comrat	4–1		3–0	4–1	5–0	1–0	7–0	0–0	5–1	1–0	0–1	3–1
Constructorul Chișinău	3–1	0–0		6–1	2–2	0–2	4–0	2–1	4–1	1–1	0–0	1–1
Constructorul Leova	0–2	0–4	1–4		0–4	1–0	1–0	2–2	0–2	0–0	0–5	0–1
Cristalul Fălești	1–2	0–5	1–11	2–1		2–4	4–4	1–1	1–4	2–1	1–3	0–1
Dinamo Codru Chișinău	1–1	1–2	2–1	4–1	2–1		0–1	0–0	3–0	1–2	2–0	1–1
Moldova Boroseni	1–2	+:- (Note: The match between Moldova Boroseni and Bugeac Comrat was rated as a goalless win for home team.)	1–2	4–0	1–0	1–1		2–1	3–1	1–2	0–1	0–4
Olimpia Bălți	0–1	0–0	1–1	4–0	1–0	2–0	2–0		0–0	0–1	0–4	1–2
Speranța Nisporeni	0–0	1–1	1–0	4–0	1–0	1–5	0–2	1–0		0–0	1–1	0–1
FC Tighina	0–0	2–2	3–1	3–0	2–1	+:- (Note: The match between FC Tighina and Dinamo Codru Chișinău was rated as a goalless win for home team.)	1–0	0–1	1–0		0–2	1–1
Tiligul Tiraspol	3–1	2–2	5–1	0–0	2–1	3–1	2–1	1–0	1–0	2–0		1–0
Zimbru Chișinău	3–1	0–0	2–0	6–2	4–1	2–0	1–0	4–2	2–0	0–0	1–0	

Source: EU-Football.info
Legend: Blue = home team win; Yellow = draw; Red = away team win.

== Top goalscorers ==
Updated to matches played on 12 April 2014.

Rank	Player	Club	Goals
1	(Moldova) Serghei Alexandrov	Bugeac Comrat	13
1	(Moldova) Oleg Flentea	Constructorul Chișinău	13
3	(Moldova) Vladimir Cosse	Tiligul Tiraspol	10
4	(Moldova) Iurie Miterev	Zimbru Chișinău	8
4	(Moldova) Alexandru Spiridon	Zimbru Chișinău	8
4	(Moldova) Vasile Carlig	Speranța Nisporeni	8
7	(Moldova) Victor Russu	Bugeac Comrat	7
7	(Moldova) Lilian Popescu	Constructorul Chișinău	7
7	(Moldova) Veaceslav Medvedev	Dinamo Codru Chisinau	7
10	(Moldova) Emil Caras	Zimbru Chișinău	6
10	(Moldova) Vlad Copoț	Bugeac Comrat	6
10	(Moldova) Gheorghe Harea	FC Tighina	6
10	(Moldova) Constantin Sturza	Constructorul Chișinău	6
10	(Moldova) Iurie Adamenco	Moldova Boroseni	6
10	(Moldova) Veaceslav Carandașov	Cristalul Făleşti	6
10	(Moldova) Dumitru Sandu	Constructorul Leova	6

5 goals (6 players)

- (Moldova) Serghei Cleșcenco (Zimbru Chișinău)
- (Russia) Igor Yuminov (Tiligul Tiraspol)
- (Moldova) Andrei Stroenco (Tiligul Tiraspol)
- (Moldova) Alexey Luchiancikov (Tiligul Tiraspol)
- (Moldova) Vasili Baryshev (FC Tighina)
- (Moldova) Pavel Cebotari (Constructorul Chișinău)

4 goals (14 players)

- (Moldova) Radu Rebeja (Zimbru Chișinău)
- (Moldova) Eduard Lemeshko (Tiligul Tiraspol)
- (Russia) Vadim Pocatilo (Bugeac Comrat)
- (Moldova) Alexandru Ciudac (Amocom Chișinău)
- (Moldova) Eugen Crivei (Amocom Chișinău)
- (Moldova) Ivan Ovcearenko (Amocom Chișinău)
- (Moldova) Ivan Tabanov (Bugeac Comrat(1) & Amocom Chișinău (3))
- (Moldova) Alexandru Avram (Constructorul Chișinău)
- (Moldova) Mihail Abianov (Dinamo Codru Chisinau)
- (Moldova) Vladimir Pikus (Dinamo Codru Chisinau)
- (Moldova) Veaceslav Shohirev (Speranța Nisporeni)
- (Moldova) Ilie Luziakin (FC Olimpia)
- Vlad Dijovski (Moldova Boroseni)
- (Moldova) Alexandru Stibelskii (Cristalul Făleşti)

3 goals (11 players)

- (Moldova) Alexandru Curtianu (Zimbru Chișinău)
- (Moldova) Serghei Dikarev (Tiligul Tiraspol)
- (Moldova) Alexei Scala (Bugeac Comrat)
- (Moldova) Victor Berco (Amocom Chișinău)
- (Moldova) Serghei Savchenko (Constructorul Chișinău)
- (Moldova) Vladislav Bogdaneț (Dinamo Codru Chisinau)
- (Moldova) Mihai Arteni (Speranța Nisporeni)
- (Moldova) Vlad Goian (FC Olimpia)
- (Moldova) Iurie Zatekliaev (FC Olimpia)
- (Ukraine) Iurii Krysiko (Cristalul Făleşti)
- (Russia) Andrei Ippolitov (Cristalul Făleşti)

2 goals (22 players)

- (Moldova) Serghei Chirilov (Zimbru Chișinău)
- (Moldova) Serghei Parhomenco (Zimbru Chișinău)
- (Moldova) Valeriu Pogorelov (Tiligul Tiraspol)
- (Moldova) Vladimir Gaidamașciuc (Bugeac Comrat)
- (Russia) Alexandr Zaitsev (Bugeac Comrat)
- (Moldova) Iurie Scala (Bugeac Comrat)
- (Moldova) Vladimir Sereda (Bugeac Comrat)
- (Moldova) Mihail Nekoichev (Bugeac Comrat)
- (Nigeria) Erik Okoko (FC Tighina)
- (Moldova) Vasilii Uzun (FC Tighina)
- (Moldova) Mihai Pavlov (FC Tighina)
- (Russia) Ilya Iliushin (Amocom Chișinău)
- (Moldova) Valentin Spînu (Amocom Chișinău (1) & Constructorul Chișinău (3))
- (Moldova) Petru Efros (Constructorul Chișinău)
- (Moldova) Boris Pronevoi (Dinamo Codru Chisinau)
- (Moldova) Gheorghe Hora (Dinamo Codru Chisinau)
- (Moldova) Andrei Naumenko (Dinamo Codru Chisinau)
- (Moldova) Gheorghe Pîrciu (Speranța Nisporeni)
- (Moldova) Ivan Dolință (FC Olimpia)
- Oleg Ivancenko (Moldova Boroseni)
- Vlad Oboroc (Moldova Boroseni)
- (Moldova) Gheorghe Rotari (Cristalul Făleşti)

1 goal (48 players)

- (Moldova) Boris Cebotari (Zimbru Chișinău)
- (Moldova) Andrei Tîmbur (Zimbru Chișinău)
- (Moldova) Nikolai Vasiliev (Tiligul Tiraspol)
- (Moldova) Igor Oprea (Tiligul Tiraspol)
- (Russia) Serghei Kabanov (Tiligul Tiraspol)
- (Moldova) Serghei Stroenco (Tiligul Tiraspol)
- (Moldova) Boris Crimus (Bugeac Comrat)
- (Ukraine) Oleh Kylchik (Bugeac Comrat)
- (Moldova) Oleg Sirotiuk (Bugeac Comrat)
- (Moldova) Mihail Goptari (Bugeac Comrat)
- (Moldova) Alexandru Vyblov (Bugeac Comrat)
- (Moldova) Valeriu Catană (FC Tighina)
- (Moldova) Ilie Grudțin (FC Tighina)
- (Moldova) Alexei Crivoi (FC Tighina)
- (Moldova) Alexei Guzun (FC Tighina)
- (Moldova) Iurie Murzac (Amocom Chișinău)
- (Moldova) Vladimir Botezatu (Amocom Chișinău)
- (Moldova) Oleg Petrov (Amocom Chișinău)
- (Moldova) Ilia Tiunnikov (Amocom Chișinău)
- (Moldova) Radu Bulat (Amocom Chișinău)
- (Moldova) Iurie Kuchuk (Amocom Chișinău)
- (Moldova) Vladimir Gudev (Amocom Chișinău)
- (Moldova) Petru Sîrbu (Amocom Chișinău)
- (Moldova) Vladimir Shirokov (Constructorul Chișinău)
- (Moldova) Nicolae Jardan (Constructorul Chișinău)
- (Ukraine) Andrei Plahetko (Dinamo Codru Chisinau)
- (Moldova) Andrei Colun (Dinamo Codru Chisinau)
- (Moldova) Sergiu Coșug (Speranța Nisporeni)
- (Moldova) Sergiu Macari (Speranța Nisporeni)
- (Moldova) Vlad Maximciuc (Speranța Nisporeni)
- (Moldova) Iurie Milicenco (FC Olimpia)
- (Moldova) Vlad Ghenaitis (FC Olimpia)
- (Moldova) Vlad Nozdrin (FC Olimpia)
- (Moldova) Gheorghe Fortuna (FC Olimpia)
- (Ukraine) Serghei Filipcenko (FC Olimpia)
- Gheorghe Bojii (Moldova Boroseni)
- Mihai Andriuță (Moldova Boroseni)
- Sergiu Carabulea (Moldova Boroseni)
- Vlad Oboroc (Moldova Boroseni)
- (Moldova) Sergiu Crivițchii (Cristalul Făleşti)
- (Moldova) Oleg Cucoș (Cristalul Făleşti)
- (Moldova) Iurie Fuior (Cristalul Făleşti)
- (Moldova) Iurie Andrițchii (Cristalul Făleşti)
- (Moldova) Gheorghe Tupiciko (Cristalul Făleşti)
- (Moldova) Iurie Smedu (Constructorul Leova)
- (Moldova) Gheorghe Zacon (Constructorul Leova)
- (Moldova) Iurie Trofim (Constructorul Leova)
- (Moldova) Vitalie Podlesnyi (Constructorul Leova)
