= 1995–96 Moldovan "A" Division =

Moldovan "A" Division
- Season: 1995–96
- Champions: Locomotiva Basarabeasca
- Promoted: Locomotiva Basarabeasca; Ciuhur Ocnița; Attila Ungheni; Victoria Cahul
- Relegated: Izvoraș Drăsliceni; Agro-Sind Căușeni; Prut Cantemir

The 1995–96 Moldovan "A" Division season is the 5th since its establishment. A total of 22 teams are contesting the league.

== League table ==
Pos	Team	Pld	W	D	L	GF	GA	GD	Pts	Promotion, qualification or relegation
1	Locomotiva Basarabeasca (C, P)	42	27	8	7	81	39	+42	89	Promotion to Divizia Națională
2	Ciuhur Ocnița (P)	42	27	8	7	64	31	+33	89	Promotion to Divizia Națională
3	Attila Ungheni (O, P)	42	25	10	7	78	41	+37	85	Qualification for the promotion play-off
4	Victoria Cahul (O, P)	42	25	7	10	66	35	+31	82	Qualification for the promotion play-off
5	Cimentul Rîbnița	42	20	7	15	68	64	+4	67	
6	MIF Chișinău	42	19	9	14	70	52	+18	66	
7	Dumbrava Cojușna	42	15	19	8	53	43	+10	64	
8	Bucuria Trușeni (Note: Bucuria Chisinau merged with Universul Truseni in spring, and continued playing in A under the name of Bucuria Truseni. At the end of the season they renamed to Universul Truseni and then merged with Sportul of Chisinau to form Unisport Chisinau, who play in the Divizia Nationala for 1996/97.)	42	18	9	15	62	53	+9	63	
9	Raut Orhei	42	16	13	13	36	39	−3	61	
10	Gloria-Cvarq Edineț	42	15	13	14	62	51	+11	58	
11	Spicul Sărata-Galbenă	42	17	7	18	56	58	−2	58	
12	Olimpia-2 Bălți	42	16	9	17	62	57	+5	57	Ineligible for promotion
13	Zimbru-2 Chișinău	42	14	14	14	43	42	+1	56	Ineligible for promotion
14	Moldova Chișinău	42	16	8	18	54	54	0	56	
15	Migdal Carahasani	42	16	8	18	65	71	−6	56	
16	Spicul Fălești	42	15	9	18	54	74	−20	54	
17	Vierul Sîngerei	42	12	14	16	48	60	−12	50	
18	Tiras Soroca	42	13	10	19	49	57	−8	49	
19	Lims Chișinău	42	12	11	19	50	73	−23	47	
20	Izvoraș Drăsliceni (R)	42	9	5	28	43	81	−38	32	Relegation to Divizia B
21	Agro-Sind Căușeni (R)	42	6	8	28	46	90	−44	26	Relegation to Divizia B
22	Prut Cantemir (R)	42	3	4	35	21	66	−45	13	Relegation to Divizia B

Source: RSSSF
(C) Champions; (O) Play-off winners; (P) Promoted; (R) Relegated

== Promotion/relegation play-off ==
22 June 1996
FC Torentul Chișinău 0–2 Victoria Cahul
Nistru Cioburciu awd Attila Ungheni

[Awarded to Attila, Nistru C didn't show up.]

Attila and Victoria were promoted to the Divizia Națională.
