= 1996–97 Moldovan "A" Division =

Moldovan "A" Division
- Season: 1996–97
- Champions: Sindicat Chișinău
- Promoted: Sindicat Chișinău; Roma Bălți
- Relegated: Olimpia-2 Bălți; Tebas Nord-Vest Chișinău

The 1996–97 Moldovan "A" Division season is the 6th since its establishment. A total of 16 teams are contesting the league.

== League table ==
Pos	Team	Pld	W	D	L	GF	GA	GD	Pts	Promotion, qualification or relegation
1	Sindicat Chișinău (C, P)	26	17	4	5	52	20	+32	55	Promotion to Divizia Națională
2	Roma Bălți (P)	26	16	7	3	43	14	+29	55	Promotion to Divizia Națională
3	Raut Orhei	26	14	7	5	44	33	+11	49	Qualification for the promotion play-off
4	Stimold-MIF Chișinău (O, P)	26	12	7	7	35	22	+13	43	Qualification for the promotion play-off
5	Dumbrava Cojușna	26	11	8	7	38	32	+6	41	
6	Migdal Carahasani	26	12	3	11	24	28	−4	39	
7	Cimentul Rîbnița	26	10	8	8	29	30	−1	38	
8	Vierul Sîngerei	26	11	4	11	31	41	−10	37	
9	Spicul Fălești	26	8	6	12	33	49	−16	30	
10	Spicul Sărata-Galbenă	26	7	9	10	26	31	−5	30	
11	LIMS USM Anenii Noi	26	6	9	11	21	34	−13	27	
12	Zimbru-2 Chișinău	26	7	5	14	21	34	−13	26	Ineligible for promotion
13	Olimpia-2 Bălți	26	6	5	15	21	37	−16	23	Relegation to Divizia B
14	Tebas Nord-Vest Chișinău	26	3	2	21	13	26	−13	11	Relegation to Divizia B

Source: RSSSF
(C) Champions; (O) Play-off winners; (P) Promoted

Tiras Soroca and Gloria Edineț withdrew after the winter break, their records were expunged:

Pos	Team	Pld	W	D	L	GF	GA	GD	Pts
15	Tiras	15	2	2	11	10	36	−26	8
16	Gloria	15	1	2	12	7	41	−34	5

Source: RSSSF

== Promotion/relegation play-off ==
25 June 1997
Agro Chișinău 5–2 Raut Orhei
Codru Călărași 1–2 (a.e.t.) Stimold-MIF Chișinău

Codru relegated, Stimold-MIF promoted.
