= Vitali Kaleshin =

Russian footballer

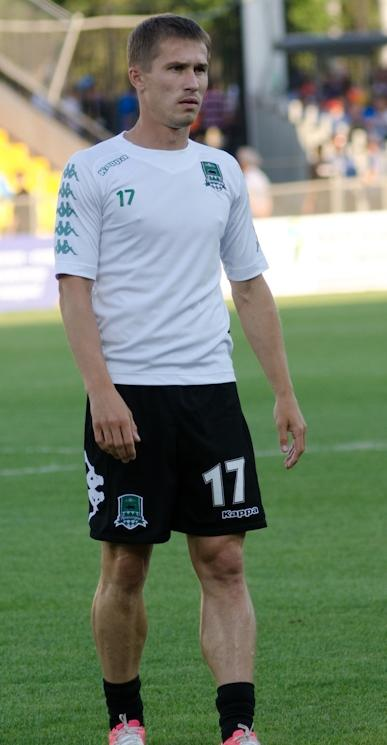
- With FC Krasnodar in 2013

Personal information
- Full name: Vitali Igorevich Kaleshin
- Date of birth: 3 October 1980 (age 46)
- Place of birth: Krasnodar, Soviet Union
- Height: 1.73 m (5 ft 8 in)
- Positions: Defender; midfielder

Youth career
- Kolos Krasnodar

Senior career*
Years	Team	Apps	(Gls)
1997	Kuban-d Krasnodar	18	(0)
1998	Roma Bălţi	21	(1)
1999–2002	Lada Togliatti	126	(19)
2003–2007	Kuban Krasnodar	150	(8)
2008–2009	FC Moscow	19	(2)
2009	→ Rubin Kazan (loan)	18	(0)
2010–2013	Rubin Kazan	49	(0)
2013–2017	FC Krasnodar	87	(3)
Total		488	(33)
- * Club domestic league appearances and goals

Vitali Igorevich Kaleshin (Russian: Виталий Игоревич Калешин; born 3 October 1980) is a former Russian footballer.

== Career ==
On 20 February 2009 FC Rubin Kazan have signed right back/right winger, on loan until December 2009 from FC Moscow.

In December 2009 FC Rubin Kazan bought from FC Moscow's right to Kaleshin. He signed a contract with the club for 2 years.

On 28 May 2013 he signed a one-year contract with FC Krasnodar.

=== Career statistics ===
Club	Season	League			Cup		Continental		Other		Total	
Club	Season	Division	Apps	Goals	Apps	Goals	Apps	Goals	Apps	Goals	Apps	Goals
FC Kuban-d Krasnodar	1997	Third League	18	0	0	0	–		–		18	0
Roma Bălți	1997–98	Moldovan National Division	6	0	0	0	–		–		6	0
Roma Bălți	1998–99	Moldovan National Division	15	1	0	0	–		–		15	1
Roma Bălți	Total		21	1	0	0	0	0	0	0	21	1
FC Lada Togliatti	1999	Second Division	30	9	5	0	–		–		35	9
FC Lada Togliatti	2000	First Division	31	4	3	0	–		–		34	4
FC Lada Togliatti	2001	First Division	34	1	2	1	–		–		36	2
FC Lada Togliatti	2002	First Division	31	5	2	1	–		–		33	6
FC Lada Togliatti	Total		126	19	12	2	0	0	0	0	138	21
FC Kuban Krasnodar	2003	First Division	28	4	1	0	–		–		29	4
FC Kuban Krasnodar	2004	Russian Premier League	28	1	4	1	–		–		32	2
FC Kuban Krasnodar	2005	First Division	37	2	3	0	–		–		40	2
FC Kuban Krasnodar	2006	First Division	28	1	0	0	–		–		28	1
FC Kuban Krasnodar	2007	Russian Premier League	29	0	2	0	–		–		31	0
FC Kuban Krasnodar	Total		150	8	10	1	0	0	0	0	160	10
FC Moscow	2008	Russian Premier League	19	2	1	0	2	0	–		22	2
FC Rubin Kazan	2009	Russian Premier League	18	0	1	0	5	0	–		24	0
FC Rubin Kazan	2010	Russian Premier League	15	0	0	0	8	0	–		23	0
FC Rubin Kazan	2011–12	Russian Premier League	23	0	3	0	8	0	–		34	0
FC Rubin Kazan	2012–13	Russian Premier League	11	0	1	0	8	0	1 (Note: One appearance in the Russian Super Cup)	0	21	0
FC Rubin Kazan	Total		67	0	5	0	29	0	1	0	102	0
FC Krasnodar	2013–14	Russian Premier League	21	1	2	0	–		–		23	1
FC Krasnodar	2014–15	Russian Premier League	24	2	1	0	9	0	–		34	2
FC Krasnodar	2015–16	Russian Premier League	25	0	1	0	10	0	–		36	0
FC Krasnodar	2016–17	Russian Premier League	17	0	2	0	7	0	–		26	0
FC Krasnodar	Total		87	3	6	0	26	0	0	0	119	3
Career total			488	33	34	3	57	0	1	0	580	36

== Personal ==
Vitali is a son of the former FC Kuban Krasnodar player Igor Kaleshin and the younger brother of Yevgeni Kaleshin.
