= 1996–97 Moldovan National Division =

Moldovan National Division
- Season: 1996–97

Statistics of Moldovan National Division for the 1996–97 season.

== Overview ==
It was contested by 16 teams and Constructorul Chişinău won the championship.

== League standings ==
Pos	Team	Pld	W	D	L	GF	GA	GD	Pts	Qualification or relegation
1	Constructorul Chişinău (C)	30	26	3	1	82	10	+72	81	Qualification for the Champions League first qualifying round
2	Zimbru Chişinău	30	22	4	4	112	21	+91	70	Qualification for the Cup Winners' Cup qualifying round
3	Tiligul-Tiras Tiraspol	30	20	8	2	73	12	+61	68	Qualification for the UEFA Cup first qualifying round
4	Nistru Otaci	30	19	6	5	58	21	+37	63	
5	Olimpia Bălţi	30	18	6	6	75	34	+41	60	
6	Speranţa Nisporeni	30	11	9	10	34	36	−2	42	
7	Dinamo Bender (Note: Tighina (Bender) changed name to Dinamo (they are now the police team).)	30	12	5	13	42	45	−3	41	
8	Locomotiva Basarabească	30	12	5	13	44	58	−14	41	
9	Unisport-Auto Chişinău (Note: Sportul Studențesc (Chișinău) merged with Universul (Trușeni) to form Unisport (Chișinău).)	30	12	5	13	40	44	−4	41	
10	Codru Călăraşi (R)	30	12	4	14	43	48	−5	40	Qualification for the relegation play-off
11	Agro-Goliador Chişinău (O)	30	11	3	16	53	47	+6	36	Qualification for the relegation play-off
12	Victoria Cahul (Note: Victoria Cahul are exempt from relegation (because of the bus accident in round 9 on the way to Bălți).)	30	7	8	15	33	61	−28	29	Spared from relegation
13	MHM 93 Chişinău (R)	30	6	7	17	32	53	−21	25	Relegation to Division "A"
14	Ciuhur Ocniţa (R)	30	6	6	18	20	97	−77	24	Relegation to Division "A"
15	Spumante Cricova (Note: Spumante Cricova were expelled from the championship after their second failure to show up for a match (in round 21 at Attila); they had disappeared at the end of the season.) (R)	30	3	4	23	21	44	−23	13	Relegation to Division "A"
16	Attila Ungheni (R)	30	1	1	28	10	141	−131	4	Relegation to Division "A"

Source: rsssf.com
(C) Champions; (O) Play-off winners; (R) Relegated
Notes:

Promoted: Sindicat Moldova-Gaz (Chișinău) and Roma (Bălți).

== Results ==
Home \ Away	AGR	UNG	CIU	COD	CON	DIN	LOC	MHM	NIS	OLI	SPE	SPU	TIL	UAC	ZIM	VIC
Agro-Goliador Chişinău		11–0	5–0	5–0	0–3	4–3	2–1	2–0	0–2	0–2	0–1	2–1	0–0	2–3	1–3	1–1
Attila Ungheni	0–2		2–2	0–4	0–13	0–1	1–6	1–3	0–2	1–4	0–1	+:- (Note: Match rated as a goalless win for home team.)	0–4	0–3	0–4	-:+ (Note: Match rated as a goalless win for away team.)
Ciuhur Ocnița	2–1	2–1		0–3	0–3	1–2	1–0	1–1	1–3	1–1	1–1	+:-	0–6	0–5	1–15	0–0
Codru Călăraşi	2–1	5–0	0–2		1–3	3–0	2–0	3–2	0–1	0–3	0–1	4–0	1–2	1–0	0–2	2–1
Constructorul Chișinău	2–1	4–0	1–0	1–0		3–0	8–0	2–0	3–1	3–1	2–0	7–1	0–0	2–0	0–0	5–1
Dinamo Bender	1–3	3–0	4–0	1–1	1–2		2–2	2–1	2–1	2–1	4–0	2–2	0–3	2–1	0–1	0–0
Locomotiva Basarabeasca	0–0	2–0	1–0	0–3	0–2	3–2		4–0	0–0	3–1	2–1	+:-	1–1	0–2	0–4	4–0
MHM 93 Chișinău	1–2	5–1	6–0	1–1	0–2	0–3	1–2		0–0	3–0	0–0	+:-	2–3	0–1	0–4	1–1
Nistru Otaci	3–2	9–0	4–0	3–1	0–1	+:-	5–1	5–1		2–0	0–0	+:-	0–0	2–1	2–2	3–0
Olimpia Bălți	2–1	12–0	9–1	3–1	1–1	4–0	6–6	2–1	2–1		5–0	+:-	0–0	1–0	3–1	3–1
Speranța Nisporeni	1–0	9–1	8–0	0–0	0–2	2–0	1–0	2–1	0–2	0–2		0–0	0–0	2–0	0–0	1–0
Spumante Cricova	0–1	8–1	0–2	-:+	-:+	-:+	4–2	0–1	0–0	1–4	2–0		0–3	1–2	-:+	-:+
Tiligul-Tiras Tiraspol	2–0	+:-	5–0	2–1	0–1	3–1	6–0	7–0	1–0	2–0	0–0	6–0		5–0	3–1	6–0
Unisport-Auto Chișinău	5–3	2–0	0–0	2–1	0–2	0–1	0–2	1–1	0–2	2–2	3–0	1–1	0–0		0–5	4–2
Zimbru Chișinău	4–0	13–0	5–1	10–1	2–1	1–1	3–1	1–0	1–2	0–1	8–2	3–0	3–0	4–1		10–0
Victoria Cahul	2–1	7–1	5–1	2–2	0–3	3–2	0–1	0–0	2–3	0–0	1–1	3–0	1–3	0–1	0–2	

Source: EU-Football.info
Legend: Blue = home team win; Yellow = draw; Red = away team win.

== Promotion play-off ==
25 January 1997

FC Agro-Goliador Chișinău	5 - 2	Răut Orhei

25 January 1997

Codru Călărași	1 - 2 a.e.t.	Stimold-MIF Chișinău

- Codru relegated, Stimold-MIF promoted.

== Goalscorers ==
Pos.	Player	Club	Goals
1	(Moldova) Serghei Rogaciov	Constructorul/Olimpia	35
2	(Moldova) Iurie Miterev	Zimbru Chișinău	34
3	(Moldova) Ruslan Barburoș	Agro Chișinău	14
3	(Moldova) Victor Berco	Olimpia Bălți	14
