= Vladimir Gaidamașciuc =

Moldovan footballer (born 1971)

Personal information
- Date of birth: 11 June 1971 (age 55)
- Place of birth: Bălți, Moldavian SSR
- Height: 1.73 m (5 ft 8 in)
- Position: Midfielder

Youth career
- Olimpia Bălţi

Senior career*
Years	Team	Apps	(Gls)
1988–1991	Olimpia Bălţi	51	(1)
1991–1992	Odesa	22	(1)
1992	Nyva Vinnytsia	1	(0)
1992–1994	Bukovyna Chernivtsi	8	(0)
1993–1997	Tiligul-Tiras Tiraspol		
1998	Hînceşti	13	(3)
1999–2000	Sheriff Tiraspol	6	(0)
2000–2002	Agro Chişinău		
2002–2003	Lukoil Chelyabinsk	60	(8)
2003–2006	Zenit Chelyabinsk	91	(4)

International career
1992–2001	Moldova	45	(1)
- * Club domestic league appearances and goals

Vladimir Gaidamașciuc (born 11 June 1971) is a Moldovan former footballer who played as a midfielder for various clubs in Moldova, Ukraine and Russia. He made 45 appearances for the Moldova national team, scoring once.

== Club career ==
Gaidamașciuc began his playing career at Olimpia Bălţi, where in 1988 he was promoted to the first team squad, playing in the Second League in the Soviet Union. In 1991, he joined Odesa in Ukraine, followed by a short time with Nyva Vinnytsia before moving in 1992 to a third Ukrainian club, Bukovyna Chernivtsi, where he played for a year.

In 1994, Gaidamașciuc returned to Moldova with Tiligul-Tiras Tiraspol, where in 1995, he helped win the Moldovan Cup. He remained with Tiligul until the end of 1997 and in early 1998 moved to Hînceşti. After a year, he moved again, to join Sheriff Tiraspol. In 1999, he again won the national cup, and the following year, the club finished as runners-up in the Moldovan National Division.

In the summer of 2000, he joined Agro Chişinău, before moving to Russia in 2002 to join Lukoil Chelyabinsk for a season, before transferring to Zenit Chelyabinsk the following year, where he remained until he retired in 2006.

== International career ==
He made his international debut on 20 May 1992, in a 1–1 draw in a friendly match against Lithuania. In his career, he played in the qualifiers for Euro 96, the 1998 World Cup, Euro 2000 and the 2002 World Cup. Between 1992 and 2001, he played for the national team 45 times and scored one goal.

== Career statistics ==
Scores and results list Moldova's goal tally first.

No	Date	Venue	Opponent	Score	Result	Competition
1.	18 November 1998	Windsor Park, Belfast, Northern Ireland	Northern Ireland	1–0	2–2	Euro 2000 qualifier

== Honours ==
Tiligul-Tiras Tiraspol

- Moldovan Cup: 1995

Sheriff Tiraspol

- Moldovan Cup: 1999
- Moldovan National Division runners-up: 1999–2000
