= Serghei Savcenco =

Moldovan footballer (1966–2010)

Personal information
- Date of birth: 10 August 1966
- Place of birth: Yampil, Vinnytsia Oblast, Ukrainian SSR
- Date of death: 3 July 2010 (aged 43)
- Place of death: Chișinău, Moldova
- Height: 1.74 m (5 ft 9 in)
- Position: Striker

Senior career*
Years	Team	Apps	(Gls)
1983–1984	FC Nistru Chișinău	40	(5)
1985–1987	PFC CSKA Moscow	95	(9)
1987	FC Tekstilshchik Tiraspol		
1988	FC Zaria Bălți	9	(3)
1988	FC Nistru Chișinău	11	(3)
1989	SC Tavriya Simferopol	3	(0)
1989	FC Torpedo Zaporizhia	33	(2)
1990	FC Nistru Chișinău	33	(8)
1990–1991	Czuwaj Przemysl		
1991	FC Tiligul Tiraspol	17	(1)
1991	FC Zimbru Chișinău		
1991–1992	Kamaks Kańczuga		
1992	FC Constructorul-Agro Chișinău	15	(3)
1992–1993	FC Torpedo Zaporizhia	6	(1)
1992–1993	FC Amacom Chișinău	6	(1)
1992–1993	FC Olimpia Satu Mare		
1993–1994	FC Sportul-Studencet Chișinău	1	(0)
1994	FC Saturn Ramenskoe	17	(3)
1994–1995	FC Nistru Otaci	5	(2)
1995–1996	FC MHM-93 Chișinău	9	(1)
1995–1996	Speranța Nisporeni	7	(1)
1996–1997	FC Maccabi Acco		(0)
1996–1997	FC Constructorul Chișinău	4	(1)
1996–1997	FC Nistru Otaci	3	(0)
1997–1998	FC Zimbru Chișinău	4	(0)
1998–1999	Nebitçi Balkanabat		
- * Club domestic league appearances and goals

Serghei Victorovici Savcenco (Ukrainian: Сергій Вікторович Савченко; 10 August 1966 – 3 July 2010) was a Soviet and Moldovan footballer who played as a striker.
