= 1997–98 Moldovan "A" Division =

Moldovan "A" Division
- Season: 1997–98
- Champions: Sheriff Tiraspol
- Promoted: Sheriff Tiraspol

The 1997–98 Moldovan "A" Division season is the 7th since its establishment. A total of 14 teams are contesting the league.

== League table ==
Pos	Team	Pld	W	D	L	GF	GA	GD	Pts	Promotion, qualification or relegation
1	Sheriff Tiraspol (Note: Tiras Tiraspol changed name to Sheriff before the season.) (C, P)	26	23	1	2	92	12	+80	70	Promotion to Divizia Națională
2	Zimbru-2 Chișinău	26	17	5	4	56	14	+42	56	Ineligible for promotion
3	Energhetic Dubăsari (Note: Energetic were allowed entrance as champions of Transnistru (as were Cimentul for 1996/97).)	26	15	4	7	45	31	+14	49	Qualification for the promotion play-off
4	Lims USM Anenii Noi	26	13	7	6	48	22	+26	46	
5	Cimentul Rîbnița	26	14	2	10	47	42	+5	44	
6	Dumbrava Cojușna	26	11	5	10	51	33	+18	38	
7	Raut Orhei	26	10	8	8	45	44	+1	38	
8	Spicul Sărata-Galbenă	26	9	7	10	31	33	−2	34	
9	ULIM-Codru Călărași	26	9	6	11	32	30	+2	33	
10	Migdal Carahasani	26	9	5	12	30	42	−12	32	
11	Vierul Sîngerei	26	7	4	15	34	58	−24	25	
12	Unisport-2 TTA Strășeni (Note: Unisport-2 Chisinau merged with TTA (Termotransauto) Straseni, a team also losing in last seasons promotion playoffs.)	26	2	11	13	22	48	−26	17	Ineligible for promotion
13	Avântul Nimoreni (Note: Avintul were given a place despite losing in the promotion playoff last season, apparently because Cristalul Ghindesti disappeared.)	26	3	4	19	23	102	−79	13	
14	Spicul Fălești	26	2	7	17	23	68	−45	13	

Source: RSSSF
(C) Champions; (P) Promoted

== Promotion/relegation play-off ==
First Leg [Dubasari, Jun 18]

- Energhetic Dubăsari 0–2 Agro Chișinău

(Svaga, Frunze)

Second Leg [Chisinau, Jun 22]

- Agro Chișinău 7–1 Energhetic Dubăsari

(Belan-2, Svaga-2, Soimu-2, Frunze - Topalo)
