= 1999–2000 Moldovan National Division =

Moldovan National Division
- Season: 1999–2000

Statistics of Moldovan National Division for the 1999–2000 season.

== Overview ==
It was contested by 10 teams and Zimbru Chişinău won the championship.

== League standings ==
Pos	Team	Pld	W	D	L	GF	GA	GD	Pts	Qualification or relegation
1	Zimbru Chişinău (C)	36	25	7	4	78	21	+57	82	Qualification for the Champions League first qualifying round
2	Sheriff Tiraspol	36	25	6	5	77	25	+52	81	Qualification for the UEFA Cup qualifying round
3	Constructorul Chişinău	36	18	11	7	52	23	+29	65	Qualification for the UEFA Cup qualifying round
4	Nistru-Unisport Otaci	36	16	11	9	53	28	+25	59	Qualification for the Intertoto Cup first round
5	Tiligul-Tiras Tiraspol	36	12	13	11	35	33	+2	49	
6	Olimpia Bălţi	36	13	7	16	42	51	−9	46	
7	Agro-Goliador Chişinău	36	10	10	16	36	56	−20	40	
8	Moldova Gaz Chişinău (R)	36	10	9	17	37	48	−11	39	Relegation to Division "A"
9	Roma Bălţi (R)	36	8	6	22	28	66	−38	30	Relegation to Division "A"
10	Energhetic Dubăsari (R)	36	2	2	32	13	100	−87	8	Relegation to Division "A"

Source: rsssf.com
(C) Champions; (R) Relegated

== Results ==
=== First and second round ===
Home \ Away	AGR	CON	ENR	MOL	NIS	OLI	ROM	SHE	TIL	ZIM
Agro Chișinău		2–5	3–1	0–2	0–2	0–0	2–1	1–1	1–0	1–2
Constructorul Chișinău	0–0		4–1	0–0	1–0	2–0	1–0	1–0	3–0	1–1
Energhetic Dubăsari	1–0	0–2		1–3	1–5	0–1	2–1	0–6	0–0	1–2
Moldova-Gaz Chișinău	1–1	0–2	2–0		0–2	1–2	1–1	2–3	0–0	1–1
Nistru-Unisport Otaci	0–0	1–0	2–0	3–0		2–2	1–0	0–2	4–2	2–1
Olimpia Bălți	1–3	1–0	2–0	1–2	2–3		4–1	1–2	1–3	0–3
Roma Bălți	1–1	1–0	3–0	1–4	2–1	0–2		1–2	0–2	0–3
Sheriff Tiraspol	5–1	1–0	4–0	3–0	0–0	2–1	6–0		2–1	2–0
Tiligul-Tiras Tiraspol	4–0	1–1	1–1	1–0	0–0	1–1	1–0	1–0		0–2
Zimbru Chișinău	6–1	1–0	2–0	6–0	0–0	3–0	1–2	3–0	1–1	

Source: EU-Football.info
Legend: Blue = home team win; Yellow = draw; Red = away team win.

=== Third and fourth round ===
Home \ Away	AGR	CON	ENR	MOL	NIS	OLI	ROM	SHE	TIL	ZIM
Agro Chișinău		0–1	2–0	2–1	2–1	0–2	4–1	1–3	2–0	0–2
Constructorul Chișinău	3–1		3–1	1–0	2–1	1–0	7–1	2–2	0–0	1–2
Energhetic Dubăsari	0–2	1–4		0–3	0–4	0–1	0–1	0–1	0–3	0–2
Moldova-Gaz Chișinău	2–0	1–1	4–1		1–1	1–2	0–1	0–2	0–0	0–1
Nistru-Unisport Otaci	1–1	0–0	5–0	1–0		3–0	2–0	1–2	0–0	0–1
Olimpia Bălți	0–0	0–0	4–0	0–2	2–2		0–1	2–1	3–2	2–5
Roma Bălți	1–1	2–3	2–1	1–1	0–1	1–1		0–3	0–0	-:+ (Note: The match between Roma Bălți and Zimbru Chișinău was cancelled in the 82nd minute and scored with a goalless win for away team.)
Sheriff Tiraspol	1–0	0–0	8–0	3–1	1–1	0–1	1–0		2–0	3–2
Tiligul-Tiras Tiraspol	1–1	1–0	4–0	0–1	1–0	1–0	2–1	0–2		1–1
Zimbru Chișinău	3–0	0–0	4–0	3–0	2–1	3–0	5–0	1–1	3–0	

Source: EU-Football.info
Legend: Blue = home team win; Yellow = draw; Red = away team win.

== Goalscorers ==
Pos.	Player	Club	Goals
1	(Moldova) Serghei Rogaciov	Sheriff Tiraspol	20
2	(Moldova) Victor Berco	Zimbru Chișinău	15
2	(Moldova) Vladimir Pustovit	Moldova Gaz / Constructorul	15
4	(Moldova) Vladimir Dovghii	Constructorul Chișinău	14
4	(Moldova) Iurie Miterev	Zimbru Chișinău	14
6	(Moldova) Serghei Pogreban	Tiligul Tiraspol	12
6	(Georgia (country)) David Mudjiri	Sheriff Tiraspol	12
6	(Moldova) Alexandru Berco	Nistru-Unisport Otaci	12
9	(Moldova) Viorel Frunză	Agro Chișinău	11
