= Oleg Flentea =

Moldovan footballer

Personal information
- Date of birth: 6 August 1964 (age 62)
- Height: 1.80 m (5 ft 11 in)
- Position: Midfielder

Youth career
- Nistru Chișinău

Senior career*
| Years | Team | Apps | (Gls) |
| 1983–1985 | Nistru Chișinău | 38 | (2) |
| 1986 | SKA Odessa | 12 | (0) |
| 1987–1990 | Tiras Tiraspol | 68 | (6) |
| 1988 | →Nistru Chișinău | 22 | (0) |
| 1991 | FC Tighina | 18 | (3) |
| 1991 | Bugeac Comrat | 21 | (6) |
| 1992–1998 | Agro Chișinău | 164 | (49) |
| 1998–1999 | Moldova-Gaz Chișinău | 32 | (6) |
| 1999–2000 | Agro Chișinău | 31 | (0) |
| 2002–2003 | FC Hîncești | 14 | (0) |
| 2004–2005 | FC Steaua Chișinău | 10 | (1) |
- * Club domestic league appearances and goals

Oleg Flentea (born 6 August 1964) is a former Moldovan footballer who played as midfielder.

== Honours ==
=== Club ===
Nistru Chișinău

- Soviet First League

Runner-up: 1982

- Soviet Second League B

Third Place: 1991 (V Zone — Center)

=== Individual ===
Constructorul Chișinău

- Divizia Națională Top scorer: 1992 (13 goals; shared with Serghei Alexandrov)
