= Cristian Efros =

Moldovan footballer and manager

Personal information
- Date of birth: 6 January 1992 (age 34)
- Place of birth: Chișinău, Moldova
- Height: 1.82 m (6 ft 0 in)
- Position: Midfielder

Team information
- Current team: Moldova (coach analyst)

Senior career*
Years	Team	Apps	(Gls)
2006–2007	Dacia Chișinău		
2007–2008	Beșiktaș Chișinău		
2008–2009	Siena 1904		
2009–2010	Iraklis Thessaloniki		
2010–2011	Snagov		
2011–2012	Ulysses		
2012–2013	Costuleni		
2013–2014	Rapid Ghidighici		

Managerial career
- 2014–2020: Speranța Nisporeni
- 2023: Jonava
- 2024–: Moldova (coach analyst)
- * Club domestic league appearances and goals

Cristian Efros (born 6 January 1992) is a Moldovan football manager and former player. He is currently a coach analyst for the Moldova national team.

Cristian Efros is the son of Petru Efros, a Moldovan football manager, FIFA players' agent and former footballer.

== Playing career ==
Efros played for youth teams of Agro Chisinau, Zimbru Chisinau and Dacia Buiucani. His First Senior Appearance was at 14 years old for Dacia-2 in 2nd League of Moldova. Furtherly continuing his career for an additional season in the same league for Beșiktaș Chișinău.

At age of 15 he was selected for the Moldova National Squad of U-17 for European Qualifiers. He was linked with interests from clubs as Benfica, Fiorentina, AC Milan, Beşiktaş Istanbul, FC Astana.

At the age of 16 he started his journey outside of Moldova by signing with Italian Seria A club AC Siena, but failing to receive the residence permit. For next season as a consequence he joined Iraklis Thessaloniki from Greek Superleague, but repeatedly a residence permit was not granted. Therefore he was not available for the clubs official appearances. At age of 18 he joined FC Snagov, and made his first EU debut from starting 11 against Victoria Branesti, with a 3-0 win, however he had received a severe injury and missed the rest of the period, at his comeback vs Delta Dulcea, he got injured again and substituted early in the game.

He soon joined Ulysses Yerevan from Armenia, FC Costuleni and FC Rapid, but the never-ending injury stints didn't let him continue his football player career at professional level and he lastly moved to CSF Speranta that were in the third Tier of Moldova, as he mixed his football player career with coaching career to retire from his player career and to start his coaching journey at Speranta at just 22 years old.

== Managerial career ==
As a coach Efros started his career with CSF Speranța in the role of the head coach, from second tier of Moldova Football League, at 22 years old. He promoted the team to the Top Tier in his first season. Debuting in the Top Tier with a winning streak from the start of the season with surprising win against multiple champion FC Sheriff and achieving multiple club records, such as Club historical qualification to Europa League qualifiers, most unbeaten run in club history with ten games, the team with most goalless draws between 2015 and 2019 in Europe, while being the youngest professional coach in Moldova and probably in the world.
