= Petru Efros =

Moldovan football manager

Personal information
- Date of birth: 23 October 1964 (age 62)
- Place of birth: Drăsliceni, Criuleni District, Moldovan SSR, USSR
- Height: 1.74 m (5 ft 9 in)
- Position: Midfielder

Youth career
- 1964–1983: Republican Football School

Senior career*
Years	Team	Apps	(Gls)
1983	Zimbru Chișinău		
1983–1985	Cristalul Fălești		
1985–1986	Tavriya Simferopol		
1986–1987	Vorskla Poltava		
1988	Izvoraș Drăsliceni		
1989–1994	Constructorul Chișinău	45	(5)

Managerial career
- 1988: Izvoraș Drăsliceni
- 1989–1997: Constructorul-Agro Chișinău
- 1994: Moldova futsal
- 2000: Zimbru Chișinău
- 2001: Edineț
- 2002: Moldova U17
- 2003: Agro Chișinău
- 2007–2008: Beșiktaș Chișinău
- * Club domestic league appearances and goals

Petru Efros (born 23 October 1964) is a Moldovan football manager, sports administrator, FIFA players' agent and former footballer.

== Biography ==
Petru Efros began to practice football at the age of 10, being a disciple of Efim Popandopulo. He graduated from Republican Football School, and launched himself in the professional football.

At the age of 19 Efros came to Zimbru Chișinău, then-named Nistru Chișinău. After a year spent at Zimbru, Efros goes in Ukraine (then Ukrainian SSR) where he played for other clubs. He has returned to Moldova in 1988 and began his activity as player-manager for Izvoraș Drăsliceni and Constructorul Chișinău, then he retired as player.

In the spring of 1990 Efros has founded the football club Agro Chișinău as Constructorul Chișinău, being its president until 1999. Between 1990 and 2003 Efros has worked as the manager of Agro Chișinău, Zimbru, Edineț, and selectioner of Moldova national futsal team, and also Moldova under-17 football team. In 2004 he became officially a FIFA players' agent. In 2007-2008 he was the manager of Beșiktaș Chișinău.

Petru Efros is married and has a son, Cristian Efros, who is a football manager and former footballer as well.
