= Valeriu Catană =

Moldavian footballer and manager

Personal information
- Full name: Valeriu Catană
- Date of birth: 18 March 1962 (age 64)
- Place of birth: Chişinău, Moldavian SSR
- Height: 1.86 m (6 ft 1 in)
- Position: Defender

Team information
- Current team: Olimp Comrat (head coach)

Senior career*
Years	Team	Apps	(Gls)
1979–1981	Nistru Chișinău		
1982–1986	Stroitel Cherepovets	88	(13)
1987	Dynamo Vologda	28	(0)
1989–1992	Tighina(-RShVSM/Apoel) Bender	95	(4)
1989	→ Cristalul Fălești (loan)		
1992–1995	Bugeac Comrat	68	(9)
1995	→ (ULIM-) Codru Calarasi (loan)	10	(1)
1995–1997	(ULIM-) Codru Calarasi	49	(7)
1995–1997	Agro Chișinău	25	(0)

International career
1992	Moldova	3	(0)

Managerial career
- 1997–2001: Agro Chișinău
- 2001: Haiduc-Sporting-U.S.M. Chişinău
- 2011: Academia UTM Chișinău
- 2014: Academia Chișinău
- * Club domestic league appearances and goals

Valeriu Catană (born 18 March 1962) is a Moldovan professional football manager and former footballer. He is the current head coach of Moldovan Liga 1 club Olimp Comrat.
