= Alexandru Jicul =

Moldovan footballer

Personal information
- Date of birth: 23 January 1982 (age 44)
- Place of birth: Soviet Union
- Height: 1.78 m (5 ft 10 in)
- Position: Forward

Senior career*
Years	Team	Apps	(Gls)
2005–2006	Dinamo Bender	11	(0)
2007–2008	FC Beșiktaș Chișinău (Moldova)		
2009	FC Sheksna Cherepovets	33	(10)
- * Club domestic league appearances and goals

Alexandru Jicul (born 23 January 1982) is a Moldovan former professional football player. He also holds Russian citizenship.
