= Marin Spânu =

Moldovan footballer

Personal information
- Date of birth: 19 November 1973 (age 52)
- Position: Midfielder

Senior career*
Years	Team	Apps	(Gls)
1991	FC Zarya Beltsy		
1992–1994	Sportul Studentesc Chișinău		
1995–1997	FC Zimbru Chișinău		
1998	FC Moldova-Gaz Chișinău		
1998	FC Lokomotiv Nizhny Novgorod		
1999–2000	Maccabi Kafr Kanna		
2000	Zhenis Astana		
2000–2001	Haiduc-Sporting Chișinău		

International career
1996–1997	Moldova	8	(0)
- * Club domestic league appearances and goals

Marin Spânu (born 19 November 1973) is a retired Moldovan football midfielder.
