= 1998–99 Moldovan National Division =

Moldovan National Division
- Season: 1998–99

Statistics of Moldovan National Division for the 1998–99 season.

== Overview ==
It was contested by 10 teams and Zimbru Chişinău won the championship.

== Fall season ==
Pos	Team	Pld	W	D	L	GF	GA	GD	Pts	Qualification
1	Zimbru Chişinău	18	14	3	1	31	4	+27	45	Qualification for the championship group
2	Constructorul Chişinău	18	10	4	4	20	9	+11	34	Qualification for the championship group
3	Tiligul-Tiras Tiraspol	18	9	4	5	22	19	+3	31	Qualification for the championship group
4	Sheriff Tiraspol	18	7	7	4	30	17	+13	28	Qualification for the championship group
5	Olimpia Bălţi	18	7	6	5	13	10	+3	27	Qualification for the championship group
6	Agro-Goliador Chişinău	18	4	6	8	13	24	−11	18	Qualification for the relegation group
7	Moldova Gaz Chişinău	18	5	3	10	15	29	−14	18	Qualification for the relegation group
8	Nistru Otaci (Note: 1 point deducted.)	18	5	4	9	17	18	−1	18	Qualification for the relegation group
9	Roma Bălţi	18	5	1	12	11	25	−14	16	Qualification for the relegation group
10	Unisport-Auto Chişinău	18	3	4	11	12	29	−17	13	Qualification for the relegation group

Source: rsssf.com

=== Results ===
Home \ Away	AGR	CON	MOL	NIS	OLI	ROM	SHE	TIL	UAC	ZIM
Agro Chișinău		0–0	0–3	2–1	0–0	0–1	1–4	1–1	2–1	0–1
Constructorul Chișinău	0–0		5–0	+:- (Note: Match rated as a goalless win for home team.)	2–1	1–0	1–1	2–0	1–0	1–2
Moldova Gaz Chișinău	1–2	0–1		+:-	0–0	1–0	2–1	2–3	1–2	1–2
Nistru Otaci	0–0	3–0	0–0		2–1	1–0	1–1	-:+ (Note: Match rated as a goalless win for away team.)	0–0	0–1
Olimpia Bălți	0–0	0–1	2–0	1–0		0–2	1–1	0–0	2–0	1–0
Roma Bălți	1–0	+:-	2–3	0–1	0–1		1–1	0–1	1–3	0–2
Sheriff Tiraspol	2–1	1–0	2–1	3–4	0–1	6–1		2–0	5–1	0–0
Tiligul-Tiras Tiraspol	4–2	1–3	3–0	3–1	1–0	2–1	0–0		3–1	0–2
Unisport-Auto Chișinău	0–2	0–2	0–0	2–2	1–2	0–1	0–0	0–0		0–3
Zimbru Chișinău	4–0	0–0	4–0	3–1	0–0	2–0	1–0	2–0	2–0	

Source: EU-Football.info
Legend: Blue = home team win; Yellow = draw; Red = away team win.

== Spring season ==
=== Championship group ===
Pos	Team	Pld	W	D	L	GF	GA	GD	Pts	Qualification
1	Zimbru Chişinău (C)	26	18	7	1	43	9	+34	61	Qualification for the Champions League first qualifying round
2	Constructorul Chişinău	26	15	6	5	30	13	+17	51	Qualification for the UEFA Cup qualifying round
3	Tiligul-Tiras Tiraspol	26	11	6	9	26	27	−1	39	Qualification for the Intertoto Cup first round
4	Sheriff Tiraspol	26	9	10	7	39	24	+15	37	Qualification for the UEFA Cup qualifying round
5	Olimpia Bălţi	26	7	9	10	14	22	−8	30	

Source: rsssf.com
(C) Champions

==== Results ====
Home \ Away	CON	OLI	SHE	TIL	ZIM
Constructorul Chișinău		1–0	2–0	0–1	1–1
Olimpia Bălți	0–2		0–0	0–0	1–1
Sheriff Tiraspol	0–1	5–0		1–1	0–0
Tiligul-Tiras Tiraspol	1–2	1–0	0–1		0–2
Zimbru Chișinău	1–1	2–0	3–2	2–0	

Source: EU-Football.info
Legend: Blue = home team win; Yellow = draw; Red = away team win.

=== Relegation group ===
Pos	Team	Pld	W	D	L	GF	GA	GD	Pts
6	Moldova Gaz Chişinău	24	9	4	11	24	33	−9	31
7	Roma Bălţi	24	6	5	13	17	27	−10	23
8	Agro-Goliador Chişinău	24	4	9	11	15	31	−16	21
9	Unisport-Auto Chişinău	24	5	6	13	16	37	−21	21
10	Nistru Otaci (Note: 1 point deducted.)	18	5	4	9	17	18	−1	18

Source: rsssf.com

==== Results ====
Home \ Away	AGR	MOL	ROM	UAC
Agro Chișinău		1–3	0–0	1–1
Moldova Gaz Chișinău	2–0		2–1	1–2
Roma Bălți	0–0	0–0		0–0
Unisport-Auto Chișinău	1–0	0–1	0–5	

Source: EU-Football.info
Legend: Blue = home team win; Yellow = draw; Red = away team win.

== Goalscorers ==
Pos.	Player	Club	Goals
1	(Moldova) Serghei Rogaciov	Sheriff Tiraspol	21
2	(Moldova) Vladislav Gavriliuc	Zimbru Chișinău	10
3	(Moldova) Vladimir Pustovit	Moldova Gaz Chișinău	7
4	(Moldova) Constantin Culic	Zimbru Chișinău	6
4	(Moldova) Vladimir Dovghii	Constructorul Chișinău	6
4	(Moldova) Alexandru Popovici	Tiligul Tiraspol	6
