= 2000–01 Moldovan "A" Division =

Moldovan "A" Division
- Season: 2000-01
- Champions: Sheriff-2 Tiraspol
- Promoted: Happy End Camenca; Petrocub-Condor Sărata-Galbenă

The 2000-01 Moldovan "A" Division season is the 10th since its establishment. A total of 16 teams are contesting the league.

== League table ==
| Pos | Team | Pld | W | D | L | GF | GA | GD | Pts | Promotion, qualification or relegation |
|---|---|---|---|---|---|---|---|---|---|---|
| 1 | Sheriff-2 Tiraspol (C) | 30 | 21 | 6 | 3 | 67 | 18 | +49 | 69 | Ineligible for promotion |
| 2 | Happy End Camenca (P) | 30 | 22 | 2 | 6 | 75 | 21 | +54 | 68 | Promotion to Divizia Națională |
| 3 | Petrocub-Condor Sărata-Galbenă (O, P) | 30 | 17 | 7 | 6 | 49 | 24 | +25 | 58 | Qualification for the promotion play-off |
| 4 | Dacia Chișinău | 30 | 16 | 8 | 6 | 45 | 20 | +25 | 56 | |
| 5 | Intersport Chișinău | 30 | 13 | 9 | 8 | 40 | 26 | +14 | 48 | |
| 6 | Fortuna Edineț | 30 | 13 | 7 | 10 | 49 | 35 | +14 | 46 | |
| 7 | Energhetic Dubăsari | 30 | 13 | 6 | 11 | 36 | 32 | +4 | 45 | |
| 8 | CSA ABV Chișinău | 30 | 11 | 8 | 11 | 30 | 33 | −3 | 41 | |
| 9 | Unisport Chișinău | 30 | 12 | 4 | 14 | 35 | 44 | −9 | 40 | |
| 10 | Zimbru-2 Chișinău | 30 | 9 | 9 | 12 | 33 | 40 | −7 | 36 | Ineligible for promotion |
| 11 | Roma Bălți | 30 | 10 | 5 | 15 | 34 | 45 | −11 | 35 | |
| 12 | Cimentul Rîbnița | 30 | 9 | 4 | 17 | 32 | 55 | −23 | 31 | |
| 13 | ULIM Chișinău | 30 | 8 | 6 | 16 | 31 | 40 | −9 | 30 | |
| 14 | Trachia-Corten | 30 | 8 | 6 | 16 | 33 | 67 | −34 | 30 | |
| 15 | Orhei | 30 | 8 | 4 | 18 | 23 | 49 | −26 | 28 | |
| 16 | Maiak Chirsova | 30 | 3 | 3 | 24 | 18 | 81 | −63 | 12 | |

Source: RSSSF
(C) Champions; (O) Play-off winners; (P) Promoted
