= 1997–98 Moldovan National Division =

Moldovan National Division
- Season: 1997–98

Statistics of Moldovan National Division for the 1997–98 season.

== Overview ==
It was contested by 14 teams and Zimbru Chişinău won the championship.

== League standings ==
Pos	Team	Pld	W	D	L	GF	GA	GD	Pts	Qualification or relegation
1	Zimbru Chişinău (C)	26	22	3	1	75	8	+67	69	Qualification for the Champions League first qualifying round
2	Tiligul-Tiras Tiraspol	26	19	2	5	45	20	+25	59	Qualification for the UEFA Cup first qualifying round
3	Constructorul Chişinău	26	17	3	6	54	32	+22	54	Qualification for the Cup Winners' Cup qualifying round
4	Nistru Otaci	26	13	6	7	36	20	+16	45	
5	Moldova Gaz Chişinău	26	14	2	10	38	28	+10	44	
6	Olimpia Bălţi	26	12	8	6	40	21	+19	44	
7	Unisport-Auto Chişinău	26	11	5	10	23	32	−9	38	
8	Roma Bălţi	26	10	7	9	40	32	+8	37	
9	Agro-Goliador Chişinău (O)	26	10	3	13	27	35	−8	33	Qualification for the relegation play-off
10	Locomotiva Basarabească (R)	26	6	7	13	21	43	−22	25	Relegation to Division "A"
11	Victoria Cahul (R)	26	6	6	14	20	42	−22	24	Relegation to Division "A"
12	Dinamo Bender (R)	26	6	4	16	19	47	−28	22	Relegation to Division "A"
13	Stimold MIF Chişinău (R)	26	2	7	17	19	60	−41	13	Relegation to Division "A"
14	Speranţa Nisporeni (Note: 2 points deducted.) (R)	26	0	5	21	9	46	−37	3	Relegation to Division "A"

Source: rsssf.com
(C) Champions; (O) Play-off winners; (R) Relegated

== Results ==
Home \ Away	AGR	CON	DIN	LOC	MOL	NIS	OLI	ROM	SPE	SMC	TIL	UAC	VIC	ZIM
Agro-Goliador Chișinău		1–4	2–1	2–0	0–1	0–1	-:+ (Note: Match rated as a goalless win for away team.)	1–0	1–0	5–1	0–2	2–1	1–1	0–2
Constructorul Chișinău	3–0		3–0	3–2	4–3	2–0	0–0	2–4	5–1	2–0	0–1	1–0	3–1	2–2
Dinamo Bender	1–0	0–2		0–1	0–1	1–0	2–3	0–0	1–0	1–1	0–3	1–2	1–2	0–5
Locomotiva Basarabeasca	1–3	2–2	1–2		1–1	1–0	2–2	0–0	2–1	1–0	0–1	0–2	1–2	0–2
Moldova Gaz Chișinău	0–2	3–2	2–1	1–1		0–1	0–1	2–1	+:- (Note: Match rated as a goalless win for home team.)	2–0	0–1	1–2	3–1	0–1
Nistru Otaci	0–0	0–1	3–0	2–0	1–0		1–0	3–1	2–2	4–0	1–1	0–0	4–1	2–2
Olimpia Bălți	2–0	4–0	3–0	5–1	1–3	3–0		0–0	1–1	3–0	0–0	1–1	3–0	1–2
Roma Bălți	4–1	1–2	8–2	0–0	4–1	0–2	1–0		1–0	1–1	0–1	4–1	1–1	0–4
Speranța Nisporeni	0–3	0–3	1–2	0–1	0–2	-:+	0–2	1–4		1–1	1–2	-:+	0–0	0–0
Stimold MIF Chișinău	0–2	0–2	2–2	0–2	0–6	1–1	1–3	1–1	3–0		1–8	1–1	4–1	0–1
Tiligul-Tiras Tiraspol	1–0	3–2	1–0	3–0	0–1	1–3	2–0	2–1	2–0	1–0		3–0	4–0	0–3
Unisport-Auto Chișinău	1–1	0–2	0–1	1–0	0–2	1–0	2–2	0–2	+:-	2–1	4–0		1–0	0–4
Victoria Cahul	1–0	1–2	0–0	1–1	1–2	0–5	0–0	0–1	2–0	3–0	0–1	0–1		1–0
Zimbru Chișinău	7–0	3–0	1–0	7–0	2–1	2–0	2–0	4–0	6–0	4–0	3–1	3–0	3–0	

Source: EU-Football.info
Legend: Blue = home team win; Yellow = draw; Red = away team win.
