= Vasile Toloconnicov =

Moldovan footballer

Personal information
- Date of birth: 12 March 1974 (age 52)
- Position: Defender

Senior career*
Years	Team	Apps	(Gls)
1992–1998	FC Zimbru Chișinău		
1998	FC Nistru Otaci		
1998–1999	FC Unisport-Auto Chişinău		
1999–2000	FC Agro Chișinău		

International career
1996–1997	Moldova	6	(0)
- * Club domestic league appearances and goals

Vasile Toloconnicov (born 12 March 1974) is a retired Moldovan footballer who played as a defender.
