= Gheorghe Harea =

Moldovan footballer

Personal information
- Date of birth: 3 February 1966 (age 60)
- Place of birth: Chișinău, Soviet Union
- Height: 1.82 m (6 ft 0 in)
- Position: Midfielder

Senior career*
Years	Team	Apps	(Gls)
1989	FC Tighina	42	(3)
1990	Nistru Chișinău	15	(1)
1990–1992	FC Tighina	67	(10)
1992	Nyva Vinnytsia	20	(2)
1993	Metalist Kharkiv	7	(0)
1993–1994	Rapid București	10	(0)
1994–1997	Nistru Otaci	74	(38)
1997–1998	Politehnica Timișoara	6	(0)
1998–1999	Agro Chișinău	24	(5)
2000	Constructorul Chișinău	2	(0)
2001	Putra Samarinda		
Total		267	(59)

International career
1991–1998	Moldova	3	(1)
- * Club domestic league appearances and goals

Gheorghe Harea (born 3 February 1966) is a Moldovan former footballer who played as a midfielder.

== International career ==
Gheorghe Harea played three friendly games at the international level for Moldova, scoring one goal in his debut, which ended with a 4–2 loss against Georgia.

=== International goal ===
Scores and results list Moldova's goal tally first.

No	Date	Venue	Opponent	Score	Result	Competition
1.	2 July 1991	Stadionul Republican, Chișinău, Moldova	Georgia	2–2	2–4	Friendly match

== Honours ==
Nyva Vinnytsia

- Ukrainian First League: 1992–93

Constructorul Chișinău

- Moldovan Cup: 2000
