= FC Prut Leova =

Prut Leova
- Full name: Fotbal Club Prut Leova
- Founded: 1992
- Dissolved: 2017
- Ground: Stadionul Leova; Leova, Moldova
- Capacity: 1,500
- 2017: Divizia B (South), 8th of 9 (withdrew)
Home colours	Away colours

FC Prut Leova was a Moldovan football club based in Leova, Moldova. It was founded in 1992 as Constructorul Leova, and played in the inaugural edition of the Moldovan National Division in 1992. In 1999 the club was renamed as FC Prut Leova.
