= Serghei Alexandrov =

Moldovan footballer (born 1965)

Personal information
- Full name: Serghei Alexandrov
- Date of birth: 26 February 1965 (age 61)
- Position: Forward

Senior career*
Years	Team	Apps	(Gls)
1992–1998	Bugeac Comrat	?	(?)

International career
1992–1998	Moldova	6	(5)
- * Club domestic league appearances and goals

Serghei Alexandrov (born 26 February 1965 or 15 May 1965) is a former Moldovan footballer who played as forward.

Between 1992 and 1998, Alexandrov played six matches for the Moldova national football team, scoring five goals, four of them in a single match: on 18 August 1992, against Pakistan, thus scoring the first hat-trick in Moldova's national team history.

== Honours ==
=== Club ===
Bugeac Comrat

- Divizia Națională

Silver medal: 1992

- Moldovan Cup: 1992

=== Individual ===
Bugeac Comrat

- Divizia Națională Top scorer: 1992 (13 goals; shared with Oleg Flentea)

== International goals ==
International goals of Serghei Alexandrov
#	Date	Stadium	Opponent	Score	Result	Competition
1	20 May 1992	Stadionul Republican, Chișinău, Moldova	Lithuania	1–0	1–1	Friendly match
2	18 August 1992	International Amman Stadium, Amman, Jordan	Pakistan	2–0	5–0	Jordan International Tournament 1992
3	18 August 1992	International Amman Stadium, Amman, Jordan	Pakistan	3–0	5–0	Jordan International Tournament 1992
4	18 August 1992	International Amman Stadium, Amman, Jordan	Pakistan	4–0	5–0	Jordan International Tournament 1992
5	18 August 1992	International Amman Stadium, Amman, Jordan	Pakistan	5–0	5–0	Jordan International Tournament 1992
