= Moldovan Liga =

Top association football league in Moldova

Liga
- Organising body: FMF
- Founded: 1992; 34 years ago
- Country: Moldova
- Confederation: UEFA
- Number of clubs: 8
- Level on pyramid: 1
- Relegation to: Liga 1
- Domestic cup(s): Cupa Moldovei; Supercupa Moldovei
- International cup(s): UEFA Champions League; UEFA Europa League; UEFA Conference League
- Current champions: Petrocub Hîncești (2nd title) (2025–26)
- Most championships: Sheriff Tiraspol (21)
- Broadcasters: We Sport TV; Liga TV
- Website: fmf.md
- Current: 2026–27 Moldovan Liga

The Moldovan Liga, officially known as Liga 7777 for sponsorship reasons, is an association football league that is the top division of Moldovan football league system. The competition was established in 1992, when Moldova became independent from the Soviet Union. It was formed in place of former Soviet republican competitions that existed since 1945. Before the Soviet occupation of Bessarabia and Northern Bukovina in 1940, clubs from modern Moldova competed in the Romanian football competitions.

There are currently eight teams in the competition. At the end of the season, the bottom club is relegated to Liga 1 and replaced by the lower league's champion.

Sheriff Tiraspol – located in Transnistria – is the most successful league club with 21 titles, followed by Zimbru Chișinău with eight wins and Milsami Orhei and Petrocub Hîncești with two wins. Constructorul Chișinău and Dacia Chișinău also won the title on one occasion each.

== Clubs ==
2026–27

Club	Location
Bălți	Bălți
Dacia Buiucani	Chișinău
Milsami	Orhei
Petrocub	Hîncești
Politehnica UTM	Chișinău
Real	Sireți
Sheriff	Tiraspol
Zimbru	Chișinău

== UEFA ranking ==
The league is ranked 34th out of 55 in the UEFA League Ranking for the 2025/26 European football season.

In the UEFA Club Ranking, Liga clubs have the following ranks (previous season rank in italics):

- 100 (88) Sheriff Tiraspol
- 191 (177) Petrocub Hîncești
- 211 (259) Milsami Orhei
- 311 (349) Zimbru Chișinău

As of 7 April 2026.

== Winners ==
Season	Champions	Runner-up	Third place	League Leading Goalscorer	Goals	Winning Coach
1992	Zimbru Chișinău	Tiligul-Tiras Tiraspol	Bugeac Comrat	(Moldova) Serghei Alexandrov (Bugeac Comrat), (Moldova) Oleg Flentea (Constructorul Chișinău)	13	(Moldova) Sergiu Sîrbu
1992–93	Zimbru Chișinău (2)	Tiligul-Tiras Tiraspol	Moldova Boroseni	(Moldova) Vladimir Cosse (Tiligul-Tiras Tiraspol)	30	(Moldova) Sergiu Sîrbu (2)
1993–94	Zimbru Chișinău (3)	Tiligul-Tiras Tiraspol	Codru Călărași	(Moldova) Vladimir Cosse (Tiligul-Tiras Tiraspol) (2)	24	(Moldova) Alexandru Spiridon
1994–95	Zimbru Chișinău (4)	Tiligul-Tiras Tiraspol	Olimpia Bălți	(Moldova) Vladislav Gavriliuc (Nistru Otaci / Zimbru Chișinău)	20	(Moldova) Alexandru Spiridon (2)
1995–96	Zimbru Chișinău (5)	Tiligul-Tiras Tiraspol	Constructorul Chișinău	(Moldova) Vladislav Gavriliuc (Zimbru Chișinău) (2)	34	(Moldova) Alexandru Spiridon (3)
1996–97	Constructorul Chișinău	Zimbru Chișinău	Tiligul-Tiras Tiraspol	(Moldova) Serghei Rogaciov (Constructorul Chișinău / Olimpia Bălți)	35	(Moldova) Alexandru Mațiura
1997–98	Zimbru Chișinău (6)	Tiligul-Tiras Tiraspol	Constructorul Chișinău	(Moldova) Serghei Cleșcenco (Zimbru Chișinău)	25	(Ukraine) Semen Altman
1998–99	Zimbru Chișinău (7)	Constructorul Chișinău	Tiligul-Tiras Tiraspol	(Moldova) Serghei Rogaciov (Sheriff Tiraspol) (2)	21	(Ukraine) Semen Altman (2)
1999–00	Zimbru Chișinău (8)	Sheriff Tiraspol	Constructorul Chișinău	(Moldova) Serghei Rogaciov (Sheriff Tiraspol) (3)	20	(Ukraine) Oleksandr Skrypnyk
2000–01	Sheriff Tiraspol	Zimbru Chișinău	Tiligul-Tiras Tiraspol	(Moldova) Ruslan Barburoș (Haiduc-Sporting / Agro Chișinău / Sheriff Tiraspol), (Georgia (country)) David Mujiri (Sheriff Tiraspol)	17	(Moldova) Vladimir Zemlianoi
2001–02	Sheriff Tiraspol (2)	Nistru Otaci	Zimbru Chișinău	(Moldova) Ruslan Barburoș (Sheriff Tiraspol) (2)	17	(Romania) Mihai Stoichiță
2002–03	Sheriff Tiraspol (3)	Zimbru Chișinău	Nistru Otaci	(Moldova) Serghei Dadu (Tiraspol / Sheriff Tiraspol)	19	(Romania) Gavril Balint
2003–04	Sheriff Tiraspol (4)	Nistru Otaci	Zimbru Chișinău	(Uzbekistan) Vladimir Shishelov (Zimbru Chișinău)	15	(Ukraine) Ihor Nakonechny
2004–05	Sheriff Tiraspol (5)	Nistru Otaci	Dacia Chișinău	(Romania) Catalin Lichioiu (Nistru Otaci)	16	(Belarus) Leonid Kuchuk
2005–06	Sheriff Tiraspol (6)	Zimbru Chișinău	Tiraspol	(Belarus) Aliaksei Kuchuk (Sheriff Tiraspol)	13	(Belarus) Leonid Kuchuk (2)
2006–07	Sheriff Tiraspol (7)	Zimbru Chișinău	Nistru Otaci	(Belarus) Aliaksei Kuchuk (Sheriff Tiraspol) (2)	17	(Belarus) Leonid Kuchuk (3)
2007–08	Sheriff Tiraspol (8)	Dacia Chișinău	Nistru Otaci	(Moldova) Igor Picușceac (Tiraspol / Sheriff Tiraspol)	14	(Belarus) Leonid Kuchuk (4)
2008–09	Sheriff Tiraspol (9)	Dacia Chișinău	Iskra-Stal Rîbnița	(Moldova) Oleg Andronic (Zimbru Chișinău)	16	(Belarus) Leonid Kuchuk (5)
2009–10	Sheriff Tiraspol (10)	Iskra-Stal Rîbnița	Olimpia Bălți	(Moldova) Alexandru Maximov (Viitorul), (Brazil) Jymmy França (Sheriff Tiraspol)	13	(Belarus) Andrei Sosnitskiy
2010–11	Dacia Chișinău	Sheriff Tiraspol	Milsami Orhei	(Moldova) Gheorghe Boghiu (Milsami Orhei)	26	(Russia) Igor Dobrovolski
2011–12	Sheriff Tiraspol (11)	Dacia Chișinău	Zimbru Chișinău	(Burkina Faso) Wilfried Balima (Sheriff Tiraspol)	18	(Belarus) Vitali Rashkevich
2012–13	Sheriff Tiraspol (12)	Dacia Chișinău	Tiraspol	(Moldova) Gheorghe Boghiu (Milsami Orhei) (2)	16	(Belarus) Vitali Rashkevich (2)
2013–14	Sheriff Tiraspol (13)	Tiraspol	Veris Chișinău	(Brazil) (Moldova) Henrique Luvannor (Sheriff Tiraspol)	26	(Moldova) Veaceslav Rusnac
2014–15	Milsami Orhei	Dacia Chișinău	Sheriff Tiraspol	(Brazil) Ricardinho (Sheriff Tiraspol)	19	(Moldova) Iurie Osipenco
2015–16	Sheriff Tiraspol (14)	Dacia Chișinău	Zimbru Chișinău	(Switzerland) Danijel Subotić (Sheriff Tiraspol)	12	(Croatia) Zoran Vulić
2016–17	Sheriff Tiraspol (15)	Dacia Chișinău	Milsami Orhei	(Brazil) Ricardinho (Sheriff Tiraspol) (2)	15	(Italy) Roberto Bordin
2017	Sheriff Tiraspol (16)	Milsami Orhei	Petrocub-Hîncești	(Moldova) Vitalie Damașcan (Sheriff Tiraspol)	13	(Italy) Roberto Bordin (2)
2018	Sheriff Tiraspol (17)	Milsami Orhei	Petrocub Hîncești	(Moldova) Vladimir Ambros (Petrocub Hîncești)	12	(Croatia) Goran Sablić
2019	Sheriff Tiraspol (18)	Sfântul Gheorghe	Petrocub Hîncești	(Belarus) Yury Kendysh (Sheriff Tiraspol)	12	(Croatia) Zoran Zekić
2020–21	Sheriff Tiraspol (19)	Petrocub Hîncești	Milsami Orhei	(Colombia) Frank Castañeda (Sheriff Tiraspol)	28	(Ukraine) Yuriy Vernydub
2021–22	Sheriff Tiraspol (20)	Petrocub Hîncești	Milsami Orhei	(Moldova) Vladimir Ambros (Petrocub Hîncești) (2)	17	(Ukraine) Yuriy Vernydub (2)
2022–23	Sheriff Tiraspol (21)	Petrocub Hîncești	Zimbru Chișinău	(Nigeria) Rasheed Akanbi (Sheriff Tiraspol), (Moldova) Alexandru Dedov (Zimbru Chișinău)	8	(Italy) Roberto Bordin (3)
2023–24	Petrocub Hîncești (1)	Sheriff Tiraspol	Zimbru Chișinău	(Moldova) Radu Gînsari (Milsami Orhei)	13	(Moldova) Andrei Martin
2024–25	Milsami Orhei (2)	Sheriff Tiraspol	Zimbru Chișinău	(Brazil) Caio Martins (Bălți)	12	(Moldova) Igor Picușceac
2025–26	Petrocub Hîncești (2)	Sheriff Tiraspol	Zimbru Chișinău	(Belarus) Dzianis Kazlouski (Zimbru Chișinău)	20	(Georgia (country)) Shota Makharadze

== Performance by club ==
Team	Titles	Runner-up
Sheriff Tiraspol	21	5
Zimbru Chișinău	8	5
Petrocub Hîncești	2	3
Milsami Orhei	2	2
Dacia Chișinău	1	7
Constructorul Chișinău	1	2
Tiligul Tiraspol	–	6
Nistru Otaci	–	3
Iskra-Stal Rîbnița	–	1
Sfîntul Gheorghe	–	1

- bold clubs actually playing in the Super Liga
- italic clubs are dissolved

== Clean sheets ==
Season	Name	Clean sheets	Club
2009–10	(Moldova) Artiom Gaiduchevici	16	Iskra-Stal Rîbnița
2010–11	(Moldova) Nicolae Calancea	20	Zimbru Chișinău
2011–12	(Moldova) Serghei Pașcenco	17	Olimpia Bălți
2012–13	(Bulgaria) Georgi Georgiev	17	Tiraspol
2013–14	(Moldova) Dumitru Stajila	17	Sheriff Tiraspol
2014–15	(Moldova) Dorian Railean, (Moldova) Serghei Pașcenco (2)	12	Dacia Chișinău, Sheriff Tiraspol
2015–16	(Moldova) Artiom Gaiduchevici (2), (Moldova) Alexei Coșelev	15	Dacia Chișinău (2), Sheriff Tiraspol
2016–17	(Moldova) Radu Mîțu	17	Milsami Orhei
2017	(Moldova) Radu Mîțu (2)	8	Milsami Orhei
2018	(Moldova) Serghei Pașcenco (3)	11	Sheriff Tiraspol
2019	(Moldova) Dumitru Celeadnic	15	Sheriff Tiraspol
2020–21	(Moldova) Cristian Avram	16	Petrocub Hîncești
2021–22	(Greece) Georgios Athanasiadis	13	Sheriff Tiraspol
2022–23	(Greece) Nikos Giannakopoulos	10	Zimbru Chișinău
2023–24	(Moldova) Silviu Șmalenea	9	Petrocub Hîncești
2024–25	(Moldova) Nicolae Cebotari	9	Zimbru Chișinău (3)
2025–26	(Moldova) Silviu Șmalenea (2), (Moldova) Emil Tîmbur	10	Petrocub Hîncești (3), Sheriff Tiraspol (7) and Milsami Orhei (3)

== Top assists ==
Season	Name	Assists	Club
2015–16	(Moldova) Eugeniu Cociuc, (Moldova) Radu Gînsari	7	Dacia Chișinău, Sheriff Tiraspol
2016–17	(Brazil) Ricardinho	14	Sheriff Tiraspol
2017	(Brazil) Cristiano da Silva	14	Sheriff Tiraspol
2018	(Belgium) Ziguy Badibanga	8	Sheriff Tiraspol
2019	(Moldova) Maxim Mihaliov	10	Dinamo-Auto Tiraspol
2020–21	(Moldova) Alexandru Antoniuc	21	Milsami Orhei
2021–22	(Moldova) Vladimir Ambros	17	Petrocub Hîncești
2022–23	(Moldova) Vladimir Ambros (2)	5	Petrocub Hîncești
2023–24	(Moldova) Vladimir Ambros (3), (Brazil) Ricardinho (2)	10	Petrocub Hîncești (3), Sheriff Tiraspol (5)
2024–25	(Moldova) Vladimir Ambros (4)	11	Petrocub Hîncești (4)
2025–26	(Moldova) Vladimir Fratea	13	Zimbru Chișinău

== Disciplinary ==
Season	Name	Points	Club
2009–10	(Moldova) Dumitru Bogdan	15	Sfântul Gheorghe
2010–11	(Moldova) Andrei Tcaciuc, (Ukraine) Oleksandr Feshchenko, (Moldova) Alexandru Cheltuială	16	Olimpia Bălți, Iskra-Stal Rîbnița, Olimpia Bălți (2)
2011–12	(Guinea) Ibrahima Camara	17	Olimpia Bălți (3)
2012–13	(Moldova) Dumitru Bogdan (2)	15	Academia Chișinău
2013–14	(Moldova) Vadim Cemirtan, (Morocco) Adil Rhaili	11	Costuleni, Milsami Orhei
2014–15	(Moldova) Eugen Celeadnic	9	Academia Chișinău (2)
2015–16	(Moldova) Andrei Cojocari	10	Milsami Orhei
2016–17	(Moldova) Eugen Celeadnic (2)	12	Academia Chișinău (3)
2017	(Russia) Georgi Bugulov	9	Speranța Nisporeni
2018	(Moldova) Alexandru Onica	17	Zimbru Chișinău
2019	(Moldova) Vasile Jardan	12	Milsami Orhei
2020–21	(Ukraine) Bohdan Mytsyk, (Moldova) Alexandru Starîș	13	Codru Lozova, Speranța Nisporeni (2)
2021–22	(Moldova) Nichita Moțpan	10	Bălți
2022–23	(Moldova) Ion Borș	10	Sfântul Gheorghe (2)
2023–24	(Russia) Igor Lambarschi	10	Milsami Orhei (4)
2024–25	(Moldova) Teodor Lungu	12	Petrocub Hîncești
2025–26	(Moldova) Vladislav Boico	14	Bălți (5)

== All-time table ==
The table lists the place each team took in each of the seasons. Teams in bold are currently playing in the Moldovan Liga (2026–27 season).

Rank	Club	Seasons^{2}	Played	Won	Drawn	Lost	Goals	^{1}Points^{3}	Gold	Silver	Bronze
1	**Sheriff Tiraspol**	28	816	603	141	72	1729-397	1950	21	5	1
2	**Zimbru Chișinău**	35	1009	535	230	244	1728-816	1781	8	5	8
3	**Bălți / Zaria Bălți**	28	809	303	181	325	975-1023	1136	0	0	2
4	Tiraspol	21	625	290	160	175	904-577	1024	1	2	5
5	**Dacia Buiucani / Dacia Chișinău**	21	594	285	144	165	843-574	999	1	7	1
6	Nistru Otaci	21	619	242	144	233	802-746	858	0	3	3
7	**Milsami Orhei**	17	493	247	95	151	754-477	836	2	2	4
8	Tiligul-Tiras Tiraspol	17	492	225	126	141	763-502	743	0	6	3
9	**Petrocub Hîncești**	12	326	160	85	81	522-306	565	2	3	3
10	Tighina	13	390	107	85	198	417-697	378	0	0	0
11	Agro Chișinău	12	340	101	70	169	378-516	355	0	0	0
12	Iskra-Stal Rîbnița	7	234	90	65	79	263-246	335	0	1	1
13	Speranța Nisporeni	12	335	81	91	163	310-501	312	0	0	0
14	Sfântul Gheorghe	9	267	84	57	126	292-427	309	0	1	0
15	Rapid Ghidighici	10	315	79	64	172	272-529	299	0	0	0
16	Unisport-Auto Chișinău	10	274	87	53	134	304-406	280	0	0	0
17	Academia Chișinău	9	282	72	61	149	277-452	277	0	0	0
18	Dinamo-Auto Tiraspol	10	266	75	54	137	294-501	273	0	0	0
19	Codru Călărași	5	146	61	28	57	209-210	181	0	0	1
20	Gagauzia	6	177	60	24	93	204-352	161	0	0	1
21	**Politehnica Chișinău**	7	195	33	49	113	150-327	148	0	0	0
22	Costuleni	4	138	35	32	71	123-203	137	0	0	0
23	Moldova-Gaz Chișinău	3	86	33	15	38	97-109	114	0	0	0
24	Torentul Chișinău	5	138	35	32	71	155-240	113	0	0	0
25	MHM-93 Chișinău	3	86	29	19	38	103-109	106	0	0	0
26	Roma Bălți	3	86	24	18	44	85-125	90	0	0	0
27	Nistru Cioburciu	4	121	29	26	66	114-225	82	0	0	0
28	Moldova Boroseni	3	82	28	18	36	85-120	74	0	0	1
29	Veris Chișinău	1	33	21	8	4	74-25	71	0	0	1
30	Locomotiva Basarabeasca	2	56	18	12	26	65-101	66	0	0	0
31	Cristalul Fălești	4	108	21	18	69	99-227	62	0	0	0
32	Progresul Briceni	3	86	20	11	55	68-213	62	0	0	0
33	Spumante Cricova	2	60	16	12	32	77-75	60	0	0	0
34	Saksan	3	81	14	15	52	53-132	57	0	0	0
35	Florești	4	92	12	7	73	67-265	43	0	0	0
36	Speranța Crihana Veche	2	66	8	9	49	55-161	30	0	0	0
37	Spartanii Sportul	3	59	6	11	42	43-160	29	0	0	0
38	Ciuhur Ocnița	1	30	6	6	18	20-97	24	0	0	0
39	Sinteza Căușeni	1	30	7	9	14	22-51	23	0	0	0
40	Ungheni	1	30	4	5	21	19-79	17	0	0	0
41	Tricon Cahul	1	30	4	9	17	25-53	17	0	0	0
42	Happy End Camenca	1	28	3	6	19	23-69	15	0	0	0
43	Spicul Chișcăreni	1	18	3	5	10	14-35	14	0	0	0
44	Codru Lozova	2	64	2	8	54	34-174	14	0	0	0
45	Stimold-MIF Chișinău	1	26	2	7	17	19-60	13	0	0	0
46	Universul Ciuciuleni	1	30	4	4	22	21-59	12	0	0	0
47	Energhetic Dubăsari	1	36	2	2	32	13-100	8	0	0	0
48	Constructurul Leova	1	22	2	3	17	11-63	8	0	0	0
49	Attila Ungheni	1	30	1	1	28	10-141	4	0	0	0
50	**Real Sireți**	0	0	0	0	0	0-0	0	0	0	0

1. For clubs that have been renamed, their name at the time of their most recent season in the Divizia Nationala is given. The current members are listed **in bold**.
2. Includes championship play-offs, doesn't include relegation play-offs.
3. For the purposes of this table, each win is worth 3 points. The three-point system was adopted in 1995.

== Republican winners (being a part the USSR) ==
- 1945 : Dinamo Chișinău
- 1946 : Dinamo Chișinău
- 1947 : Dinamo Chișinău
- 1948 : Dinamo Chișinău
- 1949 : Burevestnik Bender
- 1950 : Krasnoe Znamia Chișinău
- 1951 : Krasnoe Znamia Chișinău
- 1952 : Dinamo Chișinău
- 1953 : Dinamo Chișinău
- 1954 : KSKhI Chișinău
- 1955 : Burevestnik Bender
- 1956 : Spartak Tiraspol
- 1957 : KSKhI Chișinău
- 1958 : Moldavkabel' Bender
- 1959 : NIISVIV Chișinău
- 1960 : Tiraspol
- 1961 : KSKhI Chișinău
- 1962 : Universitet Chișinău
- 1963 : Temp Tiraspol
- 1964 : Temp Tiraspol
- 1965 : Energhia Tiraspol
- 1966 : Stroindustria Bălți
- 1967 : Nistrul Bender
- 1968 : Temp Tiraspol
- 1969 : Politehnik Chișinău
- 1970 : Politehnik Chișinău
- 1971 : Pișcevik Bender
- 1972 : Kolhoz im. Lenina Edineț
- 1973 : Pișcevik Bender
- 1974 : Dinamo Chișinău
- 1975 : Dinamo Chișinău
- 1976 : Stroitel Tiraspol
- 1977 : Stroitel Tiraspol
- 1978 : Nistru Tiraspol
- 1979 : Nistru Ciobruciu
- 1980 : Nistru Ciobruciu
- 1981 : Grănicerul Glodeni
- 1982 : Grănicerul Glodeni
- 1983 : Grănicerul Glodeni
- 1984 : Grănicerul Glodeni
- 1985 : Iskra-Stal
- 1986 : Avangard Lazovsk
- 1987 : Tekstilshchik Tiraspol
- 1988 : Tighina Bender
- 1989 : Tekstilshchik Tiraspol
- 1990 : Moldovgidromaș Chișinău
- 1991 : Speranța Nisporeni

Source RSSSF Source lena-dvorkina

== Participating clubs ==
City	#	Clubs	Years
Chișinău (16)	35	Zimbru Chișinău	1992, 1992–93, 1993–94, 1994–95, 1995–96, 1996–97, 1997–98, 1998–99, 1999–00, 2000–01, 2001–02, 2002–03, 2003–04, 2004–05, 2005–06, 2006–07, 2007–08, 2008–09, 2009–10, 2010–11, 2011–12, 2012–13, 2013–14, 2014–15, 2015–16, 2016–17, 2017, 2018, 2019, 2020–21, 2021–22, 2022–23, 2023–24, 2024–25, 2025–26
Chișinău (16)	21	Dacia Chișinău/Dacia Buiucani	2002–03, 2003–04, 2004–05, 2005–06, 2006–07, 2007–08, 2008–09, 2009–10, 2010–11, 2011–12,2012–13, 2013–14, 2014–15, 2015–16, 2016–17, 2017, 2020–21, 2022–23, 2023–24, 2024–25, 2025–26
Chișinău (16)	12	Agro Chișinău	1992–93, 1993–94, 1994–95, 1995–96, 1996–97, 1997–98, 1998–99, 1999–00, 2000–01, 2001–02, 2002–03, 2003–04
Chișinău (16)	10	Unisport Chişinău	1992, 1992–93, 1993–94, 1994–95, 1995–96, 1996–97, 1997–98, 1998–99, 2003–04, 2004–05
Chișinău (16)	9	Academia Chișinău	2008–09, 2009–10, 2010–11, 2011–12, 2012–13, 2013–14, 2014–15, 2015–16, 2016–17
Chișinău (16)	8	Rapid Ghidighici	2004–05, 2007–08, 2008–09, 2009–10, 2010–11, 2011–12, 2012–13, 2013–14
Chișinău (16)	7	Constructorul Chișinău	1992, 1995–96, 1996–97, 1997–98, 1998–99, 1999–00, 2000–01
Chișinău (16)	5	Torentul Chișinău	1992, 1992–93, 1993–94, 1994–95, 1995–96
Chișinău (16)	5	Politehnica Chișinău	2002–03, 2005–06, 2006–07, 2007–08, 2025–26
Chișinău (16)	3	MHM-93 Chișinău	1994–95, 1995–96, 1996–97
Chișinău (16)	3	Moldova-Gaz Chișinău	1997–98, 1998–99, 1999–00
Chișinău (16)	3	Spartanii Sportul	2023–24, 2024–25, 2025–26
Chișinău (16)	2	Spumante Cricova	1995–96, 1996–97
Chișinău (16)	1	Stimold-MIF Chișinău	1997–98
Chișinău (16)	1	Veris Chișinău	2013–14
Tiraspol (4)	28	Sheriff Tiraspol	1998–99, 1999–00, 2000–01, 2001–02, 2002–03, 2003–04, 2004–05, 2005–06, 2006–07, 2007–08, 2008–09, 2009–10, 2010–11, 2011–12, 2012–13, 2013–14, 2014–15, 2015–16, 2016–17, 2017,2018, 2019, 2020–21, 2021–22, 2022–23, 2023–24, 2024–25, 2025–26
Tiraspol (4)	17	Tiligul-Tiras Tiraspol	1992, 1992–93, 1993–94, 1994–95, 1995–96, 1996–97, 1997–98, 1998–99, 1999–00, 2000–01, 2001–02, 2003–04, 2004–05, 2005–06, 2006–07, 2007–08, 2009–10
Tiraspol (4)	13	Tiraspol	2002–03, 2003–04, 2004–05, 2005–06, 2006–07, 2007–08, 2008–09, 2009–10, 2010–11, 2011–12, 2012–13, 2013–14, 2014–15
Tiraspol (4)	10	Dinamo-Auto Tiraspol	2013–14, 2014–15, 2015–16, 2016–17, 2017, 2018, 2019, 2020–21, 2021–22, 2022–23
Hîncești (4)	11	Petrocub Hîncești	2015–16, 2016–17, 2017, 2018, 2019, 2020–21, 2021–22, 2022–23, 2023–24, 2024–25, 2025–26
Hîncești (4)	1	Universul Ciuciuleni	1992–93
Hîncești (4)	1	Haiducul Sporting Hîncești	2000–01
Hîncești (4)	1	Hîncesti	2001–02
Cahul (3)	2	Victoria Cahul	1996–97, 1997–98
Cahul (3)	2	Speranța Crihana Veche	2012–13, 2013–14
Cahul (3)	1	Tricon Cahul	1992–93
Ungheni (3)	4	Costuleni	2010–11, 2011–12, 2012–13, 2013–14
Ungheni (3)	1	Attila Ungheni	1996–97
Ungheni (3)	1	Ungheni	2016–17
Bălți (2)	28	Bălți	1992, 1992–93, 1993–94, 1994–95, 1995–96, 1996–97, 1997–98, 1998–99, 1999–00, 2000–01, 2006–07, 2007–08, 2008–09, 2009–10, 2010–11, 2011–12, 2012–13, 2013–14, 2014–15, 2015–16, 2016–17, 2017, 2018, 2021–22, 2022–23, 2023–24, 2024–25, 2025–26
Bălți (2)	3	Roma Bălți	1997–98, 1998–99, 1999–00
Ocnița (2)	21	Nistru Otaci	1992–93, 1993–94, 1994–95, 1995–96, 1996–97, 1997–98, 1998–99, 1999–00, 2000–01, 2001–02, 2002–03, 2003–04, 2004–05, 2005–06, 2006–07, 2007–08, 2008–09, 2009–10, 2010–11, 2011–12, 2012–13
Ocnița (2)	1	Ciuhur Ocnița	1996–97
Gagauzia (2)	6	Găgăuzia	1992, 1992–93, 1993–94, 1994–95, 1995–96, 2010–11
Gagauzia (2)	3	Saksan	2014–15, 2015–16, 2016–17
Strășeni (2)	5	Codru Călărași	1992–93, 1993–94, 1994–95, 1995–96, 1996–97
Strășeni (2)	2	Codru Lozova	2019, 2020–21
Orhei (1)	17	Milsami Orhei	2009–10, 2010–11, 2011–12, 2012–13, 2013–14, 2014–15, 2015–16, 2016–17, 2017, 2018, 2019, 2020–21, 2021–22, 2022–23, 2023–24, 2024–25, 2025–26
Tighina (1)	13	Tighina	1992, 1992–93, 1993–94, 1994–95, 1995–96, 1996–97, 1997–98, 2005–06, 2006–07, 2007–08, 2008–09, 2009–10, 2010–11
Nisporeni (1)	12	Speranța Nisporeni	1992, 1992–93, 1993–94, 1994–95, 1995–96, 1996–97, 1997–98, 2015–16, 2016–17, 2017, 2018, 2019, 2020–21
Ialoveni (1)	9	Sfântul Gheorghe	2009–10, 2010–11, 2011–12, 2017, 2018, 2019, 2020–21, 2021–22, 2022–23
Rîbnița (1)	7	Iskra-Stal Rîbnița	2007–08, 2008–09, 2009–10, 2010–11, 2011–12, 2012–13
Florești (1)	4	Florești	2020–21, 2021–22, 2023–24, 2024–25
Ștefan Vodă (1)	4	Nistru Cioburciu	1992–93, 1993–94, 1994–95, 1995–96
Fălești (1)	4	Cristalul Fălești	1992, 1992–93, 1993–94, 1994–95
Râșcani (1)	3	Moldova Boroseni	1992, 1992–93, 1993–94
Briceni (1)	3	Progresul Briceni	1993–94, 1994–95, 1995–96
Basarabeasca (1)	2	Locomotiva Basarabeasca	1996–97, 1997–98
Leova (1)	1	Constructorul Leova	1992
Căușeni (1)	1	Sinteza Căușeni	1993–94
Dubăsari (1)	1	Energhetic Dubăsari	1999–00
Slobozia (1)	1	Constructorul Cioburciu	2001–02
Camenca (1)	1	Happy End Camenca	2001–02
Sîngerei (1)	1	Spicul Chișcăreni	2017

- Districts which have never participated in Super Liga: Anenii Noi, Cantemir, Călărași, Criuleni, Dondușeni, Drochia, Edineț, Glodeni, Rezina, Soroca, Șoldănești, Taraclia, Telenești
- Transnistrian districts which have never participated in Super Liga: Grigoriopol
