= 2000–01 Moldovan National Division =

Moldovan National Division
- Season: 2000–01
- Champions: Sheriff Tiraspol
- Relegated: Haiduc-Sporting Hîncești; Olimpia Bălți
- Champions League: Sheriff Tiraspol
- UEFA Cup: Zimbru Chișinău; Nistru Otaci
- Intertoto Cup: Tiligul-Tiras Tiraspol
- Top goalscorer: Ruslan Barburoș; Davit Mujiri (17 goals)

The 2000–01 Moldovan National Division (Romanian: Divizia Națională) was the 10th season of top-tier football in Moldova.

== Overview ==
It was contested by 8 teams and Sheriff Tiraspol won the championship.

== League standings ==
Pos	Team	Pld	W	D	L	GF	GA	GD	Pts	Qualification or relegation
1	Sheriff Tiraspol (C)	28	21	4	3	58	18	+40	67	Qualification for the Champions League first qualifying round
2	Zimbru Chișinău	28	20	6	2	46	15	+31	66	Qualification for the UEFA Cup qualifying round
3	Tiligul-Tiras Tiraspol	28	11	8	9	33	34	−1	41	Qualification for the Intertoto Cup first round
4	Constructorul Chișinău	28	10	9	9	30	30	0	39	
5	Nistru Otaci	28	9	6	13	31	39	−8	33	Qualification for the UEFA Cup qualifying round
6	Agro Chișinău	28	6	7	15	26	47	−21	25 (Note: Agro Chișinău ahead of Haiduc-Sporting Hîncești on head-to-head points: Agro Chișinău 7 points; Haiduc-Sporting Hîncești 4 points.)	
7	Haiduc-Sporting Hîncești (R)	28	6	7	15	34	45	−11	25	Qualification for the relegation play-off
8	Olimpia Bălți (R)	28	3	5	20	19	49	−30	14	Relegation to Division "A"

Source: rsssf.com
(C) Champions; (R) Relegated

== Results ==
=== First and second round ===
Home \ Away	AGR	CON	HAI	NIS	OLI	SHE	TIL	ZIM
Agro Chișinău		1–1	2–1	2–2	+:- (Note: The match between Agro Chișinău and Olimpia Bălți was rated with a goalless win for home team.)	0–2	-:+ (Note: The match between Agro Chișinău and Tiligul-Tiras Tiraspol was rated with a goalless win for away team.)	1–3
Constructorul Chișinău	1–0		3–2	2–1	3–1	0–2	0–1	0–1
Haiduc-Sporting Hîncești	3–1	0–1		1–2	3–1	0–2	0–2	1–1
Nistru Otaci	3–2	1–0	3–1		3–2	1–2	1–1	0–2
Olimpia Bălți	1–3	1–2	0–2	1–1		0–0	3–1	0–1
Sheriff Tiraspol	1–0	0–0	4–1	4–1	2–1		2–4	1–2
Tiligul-Tiras Tiraspol	2–2	1–1	2–0	0–0	2–1	0–0		1–1
Zimbru Chișinău	5–1	1–1	1–0	2–1	3–0	1–0	1–0	

Source: EU-Football.info
Legend: Blue = home team win; Yellow = draw; Red = away team win.

=== Third and fourth round ===
Home \ Away	AGR	CON	HAI	NIS	OLI	SHE	TIL	ZIM
Agro Chișinău		3–2	1–0	0–1	2–2	0–4	2–3	0–0
Constructorul Chișinău	0–0		1–1	1–0	2–0	1–1	0–1	1–5
Haiduc-Sporting Hîncești	1–1	0–2		5–1	3–0	1–5	1–1	1–1
Nistru Otaci	3–0	2–1	1–1		1–0	2–3	0–1	0–1
Olimpia Bălți	0–2	0–0	1–1	1–0		0–2	1–0	2–5
Sheriff Tiraspol	2–0	3–0	2–1	2–0	1–0		5–0	1–0
Tiligul-Tiras Tiraspol	3–0	1–4	2–3	0–0	3–0	1–2		0–2
Zimbru Chișinău	1–0	0–0	1–0	1–0	1–0	1–3	2–0	

Source: EU-Football.info
Legend: Blue = home team win; Yellow = draw; Red = away team win.

== Relegation/promotion play-off ==
18 June 2001

Haiduc-Sporting Hîncești	w/o	Petrocub-Condor Sărata-Galbenă

Petrocub-Condor Sărata-Galbenă were promoted after Haiduc-Sporting Hîncești withdrew.

== Top goalscorers ==
Pos.	Player	Club	Goals
1	(Moldova) Ruslan Barburoș	Haiduc-Sporting/Agro/Sheriff	17
1	(Georgia (country)) Davit Mujiri	Sheriff Tiraspol	17
3	(Nigeria) Edward Anyamkyegh	Sheriff Tiraspol	8
3	(Moldova) Vadim Chirilov	Tiligul-Tiras Tiraspol	8
3	(Moldova) Vitalie David	Haiduc-Sporting Hîncești	8
3	(Moldova) Iurie Miterev	Zimbru Chișinău	8
