= Andrei Stroenco =

Moldovan footballer

Personal information
- Date of birth: 1 December 1971 (age 54)
- Height: 1.80 m (5 ft 11 in)
- Position: Midfielder

Youth career
- 1988–1989: Chernomorets Odesa

Senior career*
Years	Team	Apps	(Gls)
1989–1990	Tiras Tiraspol	47	(1)
1991–1992	SC Odesa	33	(5)
1992–1997	Tiligul Tiraspol	138	(41)
1998–1999	FC Kryvbas Kryvyi Rih	15	(0)
1998–1999	→ FC Kryvbas-2 Kryvyi Rih	9	(1)
1999	Tiligul Tiraspol	3	(0)
1999–2000	FC Nistru Otaci	15	(0)
2000	FC Lokomotiv Chita	22	(1)
2001	FK Atyrau	13	(0)

International career
1994–1995	Moldova	4	(0)
- * Club domestic league appearances and goals

Andrei Stroenco (born 1 December 1971) is a retired Moldovan football midfielder.
