= Oleg Petrov (footballer) =

Russian footballer

Personal information
- Date of birth: May 29, 1968 (age 58)
- Height: 1.75 m (5 ft 9 in)
- Positions: Midfielder; defender

Senior career*
Years	Team	Apps	(Gls)
1985–1988	SK EShVSM Moscow	57	(4)
1988–1991	FC Asmaral Moscow	114	(13)
1991	FC Presnya Moscow	3	(0)
1991	FC Asmaral Kislovodsk	12	(0)
1992	FC Veres Rivne	37	(0)
1993–1994	FC Anhalt Dessau	47	(4)
1995	FC Fakel Voronezh	8	(1)
- * Club domestic league appearances and goals

Oleg Petrov (Russian: Олег Львович Петров; born 29 May 1968) is a retired Russian professional footballer.
