= FC Ciuhur Ocnița =

Ciuhur Ocnița
- Full name: Fotbal Club Ciuhur Ocnița
- Founded: 1995
- Dissolved: 1997
- Ground: Stadionul Ocnița, Ocnița, Moldova
- Capacity: 300
- 1996–97: Moldovan "B" Division, 14th

Ciuhur Ocnița was a Moldovan football club based in Ocnița, Moldova. It was founded in 1995 and has played one season in Moldovan National Division - 1996–97.
