= FC Attila Ungheni =

Association football club in Moldova

Attila Ungheni
- Full name: Fotbal Club Attila Ungheni
- Founded: 1954
- Dissolved: 1997
- 1996–97: Divizia Națională, 16th of 16 (relegated)

FC Attila Ungheni was a Moldovan football club based in Ungheni, Moldova. They played one season in the Moldovan National Division, the first tier of Moldovan football.

== History ==
The club was founded in 1954 as Lokomotiv Ungheni. The same year it won the Moldavian SSR Football Cup. It was renamed to Delia Ungheni in 1992 and to Attila Ungheni in 1995. In 1996, the club was promoted to the Moldovan first tier. In 1997, it suffered relegation and was dissolved.
