= FC Beșiktaș Chișinău =

- Full name: Fotbal Club Beșiktaș Chișinău
- Founded: 2007
- Dissolved: 2008
- Ground: Stadionul Dinamo; Chișinău, Moldova
- Capacity: 2,500
- 2007–08: Moldovan "A" Division, 2nd

FC Beșiktaș Chișinău was a Moldovan football club based in Chișinău, Moldova. The club was founded on 2007, and then dissolved in 2008, due to financial issues. They have played in the Moldovan "A" Division, the second division in Moldovan football.
