= Davit Mujiri =

Georgian footballer (born 1978)

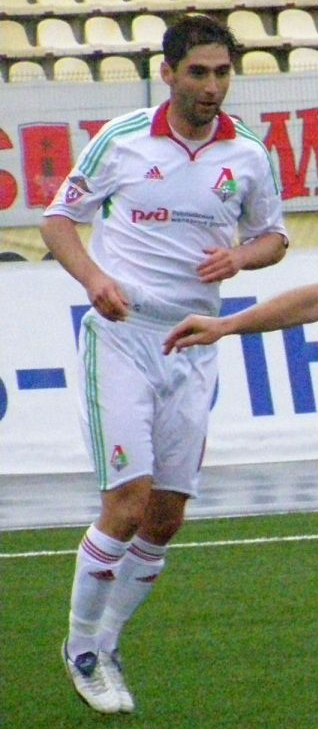
- Mujiri with Lokomotiv Moscow in 2009

Personal information
- Date of birth: 2 January 1978 (age 48)
- Place of birth: Tbilisi, Soviet Union
- Height: 1.84 m (6 ft 0 in)
- Position: Attacking midfielder

Senior career*
Years	Team	Apps	(Gls)
1994–1998	Dinamo Tbilisi	59	(24)
1999–2001	Sheriff Tiraspol	61	(29)
2001–2005	Sturm Graz	106	(21)
2005–2008	Krylia Sovetov	44	(14)
2008–2009	Lokomotiv Moscow	23	(2)
2010	Dinamo Tbilisi	12	(4)
2011	Sanfrecce Hiroshima	34	(6)
2012	Zestaponi	24	(3)
Total		363	(103)

International career
1993	Georgia U17	2	(1)
1994	Georgia U19	2	(0)
1995–1997	Georgia U21	9	(2)
2003–2008	Georgia	25	(1)
- * Club domestic league appearances and goals

Davit Mujiri (Georgian: დავით მუჯირი born 2 January 1978) is a Georgian former professional footballer who played as a midfielder.

Mujiri made 26 appearances for the Georgia national football team.

== International goals ==
No.	Date	Venue	Opponent	Score	Result	Competition
1.	16 August 2006	Svangaskarð, Toftir, Faroe Islands	Faroe Islands	1–0	6–0	UEFA Euro 2008 qualifying
