= Serghei Rogaciov =

Moldovan footballer (born 1977)

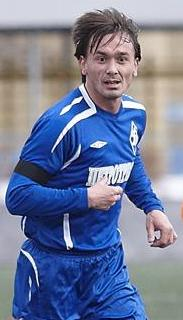
- Rogaciov with Dynamo Saint Petersburg in 2010

Personal information
- Date of birth: 20 May 1977 (age 49)
- Place of birth: Glodeni, Moldavian SSR, Soviet Union
- Height: 1.83 m (6 ft 0 in)
- Position: Forward

Senior career*
Years	Team	Apps	(Gls)
1993	Cristalul Făleşti	12	(2)
1994–1996	Olimpia Bălţi	75	(64)
1997	Constructorul Chişinău	4	(2)
1997–1998	Olimpia Bălţi	13	(15)
1998–2000	Sheriff Tiraspol	58	(41)
2000–2005	Saturn Moscow Oblast	114	(32)
2000	→ Saturn B Moscow Oblast	2	(0)
2006–2007	Aktobe	57	(32)
2008	Ural Sverdlovsk Oblast	25	(5)
2009	Olimpia Bălţi	8	(3)
2009	Vostok	13	(6)
2010	Dynamo Saint Petersburg	26	(4)
Total		407	(206)

International career
1996–2007	Moldova	52	(9)

Managerial career
- 2011–2012: Olimpia Bălți (assistant)
- 2012–2013: Olimpia-2
- 2013: Olimpia Bălți
- * Club domestic league appearances and goals

Serghei Rogaciov (born 20 May 1977) is a Moldovan football coach and a former player who played as a forward.

== Club career ==
Rogaciov played for Constructorul Chişinău, Sheriff Tiraspol, Olimpia Bălţi, and Cristalul Făleşti, Saturn Ramenskoye, Aktobe and Ural Sverdlovsk Oblast.

== International career ==
Rogaciov played nine games for the Moldova national team in 2006 FIFA World Cup qualification (UEFA) and six games in UEFA Euro 2008 qualifying.

== Other Fact ==
Rogaciov was one of the 11 Moldovan football players challenged and beaten by Tony Hawks and features in his book Playing the Moldovans at Tennis.

== Career statistics ==
Scores and results list Moldova's goal tally first.

No	Date	Venue	Opponent	Score	Result	Competition
1	4 February 2000	Ammochostos Stadium, Larnaca, Cyprus	Lithuania	1–0	2–1	Cyprus International Tournament
2	4 February 2000	Ammochostos Stadium, Larnaca, Cyprus	Lithuania	2–0	2–1	Cyprus International Tournament
3.	16 August 2000	Stadionul Republican, Chișinău, Moldova	Malta	1–0	1–0	Friendly match
4.	28 April 2004	National Stadium Ramat Gan, Ramat Gan, Israel	Israel	1–1	1–1	Friendly match
5	3 September 2005	Stadionul Republican, Chișinău, Moldova	Belarus	1–0	2–0	2006 World Cup qualifier
6	3 September 2005	Stadionul Republican, Chișinău, Moldova	Belarus	2–0	2–0	2006 World Cup qualifier
7.	7 September 2005	Stadionul Republican, Chișinău, Moldova	Slovenia	1–0	1–2	2006 World Cup qualifier
8	7 October 2006	Zimbru Stadium, Chișinău, Moldova	Bosnia and Herzegovina	1–0	2–2	Euro 2008 qualifier
9	7 October 2006	Zimbru Stadium, Chișinău, Moldova	Bosnia and Herzegovina	2–0	2–2	Euro 2008 qualifier
