= FC Locomotiva Basarabeasca =

Locomotiva Basarabeasca
- Full name: Fotbal Club Locomotiva Basarabeasca
- Founded: 1995
- Ground: Stadionul Basarabeasca; Basarabeasca, Moldova
- Capacity: 1,500
- 2010–11: Moldovan "B" Division, 10th
Home colours	Away colours

FC Locomotiva Basarabeasca is a Moldovan football club based in Basarabeasca, Moldova. The club was founded in 1995 and played 2 seasons in the Moldovan National Division, the top division in Moldovan football.

== Achievements ==
- Divizia A

Winners (1): 1995–96
