= Stimold-MIF Chișinău =

- Full name: Stimold-MIF Chișinău
- Founded: 1996
- Dissolved: 1998
- Ground: Stadionul Dinamo; Chișinău, Moldova
- Capacity: 2,692
- 1997–98: Moldovan National Division, 13th

Stimold-MIF Chișinău was a Moldovan football club based in Chișinău, Moldova. They played in the Moldovan National Division, the top division in Moldovan football.
