= FC Moldova-Gaz Chișinău =

Moldova-Gaz Chişinău
- Full name: Fotbal Club Moldova Gaz Chişinău
- Founded: 1994
- Dissolved: 2000
- Ground: Dinamo Stadium; Chişinău, Moldova
- Capacity: 2,692
- 1999–2000: Moldovan National Division, 8th
Home colours	Away colours

FC Moldova-Gaz Chişinău was a Moldovan football club based in Chişinău, Moldova. They were founded with the name of Sindicat Chişinău in 1994. In their five years of existence they've played three seasons in the Moldovan National Division, the top division in Moldovan football.

== Achievements ==
- Divizia A

Winners (1): 1996–97
