= Roma Bălți =

- Full name: Fotbal Club Roma Bălți
- Founded: 1994
- Ground: Stadionul Municipal; Bălți, Moldova
- Capacity: 5,000
- 1999–2000: Moldovan National Division, 9th
Home colours	Away colours

Roma Bălți is a Moldovan football club based in Bălți, Moldova. Club was founded in 1994 and played 3 seasons in Moldovan National Division, the top division in Moldovan football.

== Achievements ==
- Divizia B

Winners (1): 1995–96
