= FC Unisport-Auto Chișinău =

Unisport Chişinău
- Full name: FC Unisport-Auto Chişinău
- Nickname: Bus stop boys
- Founded: 1991
- Dissolved: 2005
- Stadium: Dinamo Stadium, Chişinău, Moldova
- Capacity: 2,888
Home colours	Away colours

FC Unisport-Auto Chişinău was a football club from Moldova. It existed between 1991 and 2005, when it was dissolved.

== History ==
- 1991: Amocom Chişinău
- 1994: Sportul Studentesc Chişinău
- 1996: Merge with Universul Truşeni and Bucuria Chişinău to form Unisport Chişinău
- 1997: Merge with Termotransauto Străşeni to form Unisport-2 Termotransauto Străşeni
- 1999: Merge with FC Nistru Otaci to form Nistru-Unisport Otaci
- 2000: Merge was cancelled, restarted as Unisport-Auto Chişinău in the Moldovan Divizia A

=== League record history ===
Season	Tier	Pos.	P	W	D	L	F	A	GD	Pts	Cup	Notes
1996–97	1	9th	30	12	5	13	40	44	-4	41	Round of 16	
1997–98	1	7th	26	11	5	10	23	32	-9	38	Round of 16	
1998–99	1	10th	18	3	4	11	12	29	-17	13	Round of 16	Won Relegation Playoff
Club licensee loaned to FC Nistru Otaci
2000–01	2	9th	30	12	4	14	35	44	-9	40	Round of 16	
2001–02	2	8th	30	12	7	11	48	47	1	43	Round of 16	
2002–03	2	3rd	26	17	5	4	44	22	22	56	Round of 16	Won Promotion playoffs
2003–04	1	7th	28	6	5	17	29	52	-23	23	Quarter final	Won Relegation playoffs
2004–05	1	7th	28	3	5	20	16	51	-35	14	Round of 16	Lost Relegation playoffs

== Unisport-2 Chişinău ==
Unisport-2 is the reserve team of Unisport, the Moldovan league system allow the reserve play in the same league system but not allowed to promoted to Divizia Naţională.

The team merged with Termotransauto Străşeni in 1997, to form Unisport-2 Termotransauto Străşeni.

In 2000 the second team became first team.

=== League record history ===
Season		Pos.	Pl.	W	D	L	GS	GA	P	Notes
1997–98	2D	12	26	2	11	13	22	48	17	
1998–99	3D									
1999–00	2D	10	26	7	7	12	28	40	28	
