= FC Spicul Fălești =

Spicul Fălești
- Full name: Fotbal Club Spicul Fălești
- Founded: 1991
- Dissolved: 1998
- Ground: Stadionul Cristalul; Făleşti, Moldova
- Capacity: 1,000
- 1997–1998: Moldovan "A" Division, 14th

FC Spicul Fălești was a Moldovan football club based in Făleşti, Moldova. The club was founded in 1991 as FC Cristalul Fălești, and was dissolved in 1998. They played 4 seasons in the Moldovan National Division, the top division in Moldovan football.

== Achievements ==
- Divizia B

Winners (1): 1996–97
