= FC Agro-Goliador Chișinău =

Agro Chișinău
- Full name: Fotbal Club Agro Chișinău
- Nickname: Greens
- Short name: FC Agro
- Founded: 5 March 1990, by Petru Efros
- Dissolved: 2005
- Ground: Dinamo Stadium (Chișinău)
Home colours	Away colours

FC Agro Chișinău was a Moldovan football club based in Chișinău. It played in the Moldovan National Division from 1992 to 2004. It was dissolved in 2005.

== History ==
Founded as Constructorul Chișinău in 1990, the club was renamed Constructorul-Agro Chișinău in 1992, and then Agro Chișinău in 1993. After being relegated from the Moldovan National Division in 2004, the club was renamed Agro-Goliador Chișinău.

== Recent history ==
Season		Pos.	Pl.	W	D	L	GS	GA	P	Cup	Notes
1992–93	1D	10	30	10	5	15	45	46	25		
1993–94	1D	8	30	10	6	14	40	53	26		
1994–95	1D	8	26	8	6	12	24	37	30		
1995–96	1D	4	30	19	6	5	60	27	63	Round of 16	
1996–97	1D	11	30	11	3	16	53	47	36	Round of 16	Won promotion/relegation playoffs
1997–98	1D	9	26	10	3	13	27	35	33		Won promotion/relegation playoffs
1998–99	1D	8	24	4	9	11	15	31	21	Round of 16	
1999-00	1D	7	36	10	10	16	36	56	40	Round of 16	
2000–01	1D	6	28	6	7	15	26	47	25	Round of 16	
2001–02	1D	6	28	8	5	15	25	38	29	Quarter-finalists	
2002–03	1D	6	24	4	8	12	13	33	22	Quarter-finalists	
2003–04	1D	8	28	1	2	25	14	66	5	Quarter-finalists	Relegated
2004–05	2D	15	30	5	2	23	17	56	17		Relegated

== Notable coaches ==
- (Russia) Yuri Gavrilov (player-manager)
