= 2014–15 Moldovan Cup =

Cupa Moldovei

Tournament details
- Country: Moldova

Final positions
- Champions: Sheriff Tiraspol
- Runners-up: Dacia Chișinău

The 2014–15 Moldovan Cup is the 24th season of the Moldovan annual football tournament. The competition began on 23 August 2013 with the First Preliminary Round and will end with the final held in May 2014. The winner of the competition will qualify for the first qualifying round of the 2014–15 UEFA Europa League.

== First Preliminary Round ==
Entering this round are 26 clubs from the Moldovan "B" Division. These matches took place on 23, 24 August 2014.

Team 1	Score	Team 2
Iskra Rîbnița (3)	0−2	FC Dava Soroca (3)
FC Spicul Chișcăreni (3)	3−0	FC Florești (3)
FC Grănicerul (3)	2−3 (a.e.t.)	FC Fălești (3)
CS Drochia (3)	3−2 (a.e.t.)	CF Rîșcani (3)
FC Boldurești (3)	4−2	Codru Călărași (3)
ȘSSRF (3)	1−0	CFR Ialoveni (3)
FC Olan (3)	3−1	Anina-ȘS Anenii Noi (3)
CF Ungheni (3)	0−0 (a.e.t.) (1–3 p)	FC Codru Junior (3)
ȘS Ialoveni (3)	1−4	CSF Cricova (3)
CF Sparta (3)	3−2	Sinteza Căușeni (3)
FC Congaz (3)	0−3	FC Prut Leova (3)
FC Trachia (3)	1−1 (a.e.t.) (4–5 p)	FC Maiak Chirsova (3)
FC Cahul-2005 (3)	1−1 (a.e.t.) (4–0 p)	FC Slobozia Mare (3)

== Second Preliminary Round ==
The 13 winners from the previous round and 1 clubs from the Moldovan "B" Division entered this stage of the competition. These matches took place on 30 and 31 August 2014.

Team 1	Score	Team 2
FC Dava Soroca (3)	1−3	FC Sîngerei (3)
FC Spicul Chișcăreni (3)	2−1	FC Fălești (3)
CS Drochia (3)	5−1	FC Codru Junior (3)
ȘSSRF (3)	3−2 (a.e.t.)	FC Boldurești (3)
FC Olan (3)	1−4	CSF Cricova (3)
CF Sparta (3)	1−0	FC Prut Leova (3)
FC Maiak Chirsova (3)	3−4	FC Cahul-2005 (3)

== First round ==
In this round enter teams from "A" Division. They will play against 7 winner teams from the second preliminary round. These matches took place on 7 September 2014.

Team 1	Score	Team 2
FC Sîngerei (3)	2–1 (a.e.t.)	Real Succes (2)
FC Spicul Chișcăreni (3)	1–0	Budăi (2)
CS Drochia (3)	1–3	Edineț (2)
ȘSSRF (3)	1–2	Intersport-Aroma (2)
CSF Cricova (3)	0–3	Speranța Nisporeni (2)
CF Sparta (3)	2–5	Găgăuzia (2)
FC Cahul-2005 (3)	3–3(a.e.t.) (5–6 p)	CS Petrocub (2)

== Second round ==
Draw was on 9 September 2014. These matches took place on 23 & 24 September 2014.

Team 1	Score	Team 2
Victoria Bardar (2)	0–2 (a.e.t.)	Academia Chișinău (1)
Speranța Nisporeni (2)	1–0	Saxan (1)
FC Spicul Chișcăreni (3)	1–2	FC Sîngerei (3)
Sfîntul Gheorghe (2)	0–3	Zaria Bălți (1)

23 September 2014	Speranța Nisporeni	1–0	Saxan	Nisporeni
	Cerescu 60' (pen.)			Stadium: Stadionul Mircea Eliade; Referee: Iurie Rochin

23 September 2014	Victoria Bardar	0–2 (a.e.t.)	Academia Chișinău	Bardar
			Zlatan 103', 113'	Stadium: Bardar Stadium; Referee: Alexandru Tean

24 September 2014	FC Spicul Chișcăreni	1–2	FC Sîngerei	Chișcăreni
	Istrati 60'		Laevschi 82', 88'	Stadium: Chișcăreni Stadium; Referee: Petru Stoianov

24 September 2014	Sfîntul Gheorghe	0–3	Zaria Bălți	Suruceni
			Bezimov 34'; Bojii 44'; Marina 62'	Stadium: Stadionul Suruceni; Referee: Gheoghe Malinovschi

== Third round ==
These matches took place on 28 and 29 October 2014.

Team 1	Score	Team 2
Academia Chișinău (1)	0–4	Sheriff Tiraspol (1)
FC Sîngerei (3)	1–4	FC Veris (1)
FC Costuleni (1)	6–1	Edineț (2)
Intersport-Aroma (2)	0–1 (a.e.t.)	Milsami Orhei (1)
Speranța Nisporeni (2)	0–2	FC Tiraspol (1)
Găgăuzia (2)	0–10	Zimbru (1)
Dacia (1)	3–0	CS Petrocub (2)
Dinamo-Auto (1)	4–0	Zaria Bălți (1)

28 October	FC Costuleni	6–1	Edineț	Ghidighici Stadium, Ghidighici
13:00 CET	Carandașov 7'; Onofrei 28'; V. Andronic 38'; Muzîciuc 50'; Ciofu 75', 78'		Popovici 7'	Referee: Ghenadie Sidenco

28 October	Intersport-Aroma	0–1	Milsami Orhei	Stadionul Cobusca Nouă, Cobusca Nouă
13:00 CET			Iavorschi 102'	Referee: Ruslan Muntean

28 October	Speranța Nisporeni	0–2	FC Tiraspol	Stadionul Mircea Eliade, Nisporeni
13:00 CET			Smyrnov 21'; Boghiu 90'	Referee: Petru Stoianov

28 October	Dinamo-Auto	4–0	Zaria Bălți	Dinamo-Auto Stadium, Tîrnauca
13:00 CET	Mihaliov 18'; Dragovozov 20'; Mudrac 57', 83'			Referee: Andrei Cojocaru

29 October	Academia Chișinău	0–4	Sheriff Tiraspol	Stadionul CPSM, Vadul lui Vodă
13:00 CET			Gînsari 49'; Semirov 77'; Benson 78'; Ricardinho 86'

29 October	Găgăuzia	0–10	Zimbru	Comrat Stadium, Comrat
13:00 CET			Grosu 17'; Vremea 22'; Potîrniche 28'; Dedov 31', 64', 70'; Spătaru 54'; Alexeev 61', 87'; Pașcenco 75'

29 October	Dacia	3–0	CS Petrocub	Stadionul Moldova, Speia
13:00 CET	Krkotić 34'; Leucă 65', 85'

29 October	FC Sîngerei	1–4	FC Veris	Sîngerei Stadium, Sîngerei
13:00 CET	Guțu 79'		Akimov 2'; Racu 49'; Ilescu 60'; Calincov 71'

== Quarter-finals ==
These matches took place on 2 and 3 December 2014.

Team 1	Score	Team 2
Dinamo-Auto (1)	0–3	Dacia (1)
FC Veris (1)	0–1 (a.e.t.)	Sheriff Tiraspol (1)
FC Costuleni (1)	w/o	Milsami Orhei (1)
FC Tiraspol (1)	0–0 (4–3 pen.)	Zimbru (1)

2 November	Dinamo-Auto	0–3	Dacia	Dinamo-Auto Stadium, Tîrnauca
12:00 CET			Leucă 8'; Krkotić 61'; Popescu 76'	Referee: Sergiu Derenov

3 November	FC Veris	0–1 (a.e.t.)	Sheriff Tiraspol	CSCT Buiucani Stadium, Chișinău
12:00 CET			Benson 117'	Referee: Gheorghe Malinovschi

3 November	FC Tiraspol	0–0 (a.e.t.) (4–3 p)	Zimbru	Sheriff Stadium, Tiraspol
12:00 CET				Referee: Iurie Rochin
	Penalties
	Sydorenko (penalty scored); Khachaturov (penalty missed); Bîrdan (penalty missed); Barroso (penalty scored); Boghiu (penalty scored); Molla (penalty scored)		Dedov (penalty scored); Erhan (penalty missed); Pașcenco (penalty scored); Grosu (penalty missed); Spătaru (penalty scored); Jardan (penalty missed)

== Semi-finals ==
This round featured the four winners from the previous round. The matches were played on 29 April 2015.

Team 1	Score	Team 2
Dacia	1–1 (6–5 p)	FC Tiraspol
Sheriff Tiraspol	3–0	Milsami Orhei

29 April 2015	Dacia	1–1 (6–5 p)	FC Tiraspol	Stadionul Moldova (Speia), Speia
16:00 CET				Referee: Ruslan Muntean

29 April 2015	Sheriff Tiraspol	3–0	Milsami Orhei	Sheriff Stadium, Tiraspol
18:00 CET				Referee: Alexandru Tian

== Final ==
This round featured the two winners from the previous round. The match were played on 24 May 2015.

24 May 2015	Sheriff Tiraspol	3–2 (a.e.t.)	Dacia Chişinău	Zimbru Stadium, Chișinău
20:00 EEST	Juninho Potiguar 9'; Iurcu 52'; Isa 109'		66' (o.g.) Juric; 90+4' Leucă	Attendance: 5328; Referee: Oliver Drachta (Austria)

== Top goalscorers ==
Updated to matches played on 30 April 2015.

Rank	Player	Club	Goals
1	(Moldova) Petru Leucă	FC Dacia Chișinău	4
2	(Moldova) Alexandru Dedov	FC Zimbru Chișinău	3
3	(Moldova) Andrei Ciofu	FC Costuleni	2
3	(Moldova) Victor Mudrac	Dinamo-Auto	2
3	(Moldova) Serghei Alexeev	FC Zimbru Chișinău	2
3	(Montenegro) Miloš Krkotić	FC Dacia Chișinău	2
3	(Netherlands) Fred Benson	FC Sheriff Tiraspol	2
3	(Brazil) Ricardinho	FC Sheriff Tiraspol	2
3	(Bulgaria) Ismail Isa	FC Sheriff Tiraspol	2

1 goal (28 players)

- (Moldova) Ivan Carandaşov (FC Costuleni)
- (Moldova) Octavian Onofrei (FC Costuleni)
- (Moldova) Valeriu Andronic (FC Costuleni)
- (Moldova) Alexandr Muzîciuc (FC Costuleni)
- (Moldova) Serghei Popovici (Edineţ)
- (Moldova) Constantin Iavorschi (Milsami Orhei)
- (Ukraine) Yevhen Smyrnov (FC Tiraspol)
- (Moldova) Gheorghe Boghiu (FC Tiraspol)
- (Serbia) Mihajlo Cakić (FC Tiraspol)
- (Moldova) Maxim Mihaliov (Dinamo-Auto)
- (Moldova) Vladimir Dragovozov (Dinamo-Auto)
- (Moldova) Radu Gînsari (FC Sheriff Tiraspol)
- (Moldova) Dumitru Semirov (FC Sheriff Tiraspol)
- (Brazil) Leonel Olímpio (FC Sheriff Tiraspol)
- (Brazil) Juninho Potiguar (FC Sheriff Tiraspol)
- (Moldova) Maxim Iurcu (FC Sheriff Tiraspol)
- (Moldova) Alexandru Sergiu Grosu (FC Zimbru Chișinău)
- (Moldova) Alexandru Vremea (FC Zimbru Chișinău)
- (Moldova) Maxim Potîrniche (FC Zimbru Chișinău)
- (Moldova) Dan Spătaru (FC Zimbru Chişinău)
- (Moldova) Alexandru Pașcenco (FC Zimbru Chişinău)
- (Moldova) Dumitru Popescu (FC Dacia Chișinău)
- (Moldova) Viorel Frunză (FC Dacia Chișinău)
- (Moldova) Nicolae Guțu (FC Sîngerei)
- (Ukraine) Veaceslav Akimov (FC Veris)
- (Moldova) Petru Racu (FC Veris)
- (Moldova) Denis Ilescu (FC Veris)
- (Moldova) Denis Calincov (FC Veris)

=== Hat-tricks ===
Key
^{4}	Player scored four goals
^{5}	Player scored five goals

Player	Home	Away	Result	Date
(Moldova) Alexandru Dedov	Găgăuzia	Zimbru	0–10	29 October 2014
