= 2015–16 Moldovan Cup =

Cupa Moldovei

Tournament details
- Country: Moldova
- Teams: 47

Final positions
- Champions: Zaria Bălți
- Runners-up: Milsami Orhei

Tournament statistics
- Matches played: 45
- Goals scored: 153 (3.4 per match)

The 2015–16 Moldovan Cup is the 25th season of the Moldovan annual football tournament. The competition began on 22 August 2015 with the first preliminary round and will end with the final held in May 2016. The winner of the competition will qualify for the first qualifying round of the 2016–17 UEFA Europa League.

== Participating teams ==
Following teams will take part in 2015–16 2015–16 Moldovan Cup.

2015–16 National Division	2015–16 "A" Division	2015–16 "B" Division
Sheriff Tiraspol ^{title holder}; Dacia Chișinău; Milsami Orhei; Dinamo-Auto; Zimbru Chișinău; Academia Chișinău; Zaria Bălți; CS Petrocub; Speranța Nisporeni; Saxan	2015–16 "A" Division (II): CF Ungheni; Codru Lozova; Intersport-Aroma; Spicul Chișcăreni; CF Găgăuzia; Victoria Chișinău; FC Edineț; FC Iskra-Stal; Real Succes; Sfîntul Gheorghe; Prut Leova	2015–16 "B" Division (III): FC Bogzești (group Center); CFR Ialoveni (group Center); Sinteza Căușeni (group Center); CS Politeh (group Center); Codru Călăraşi Junior (group Center); CSF Cricova (group Center); CS Anina (group Center); FC Cruiz (group Center); Dava Soroca (group North); CF Rîșcani (group North); FC Sîngerei (group North); FC Grănicerul (group North); FC Floreşti (group North); CS Intersport Sănătăuca (group North); CS Drochia (group North); FC Făleşti (group North); FC Cotiujănii Mari (group North); FC Teleneşti (group North); CF Sparta Selemet (group South); FC Cahul-2005 (group South); FC Slobozia Mare (group South); FC Maiak Chirsova (group South); FC Sireți (group South); FC Congaz (group South); FC Trachia (group South); FC Boldureşti (group South)

Roman number in brackets denote the level of respective league in Football in Moldova

== First preliminary round ==
Entering this round are 26 clubs from the Moldovan "B" Division. These matches took place on 22, 23 August 2015.

Team 1	Score	Team 2
CF Rîșcani (3)	2–0	FC Grănicerul (3)
CS Drochia (3)	2–0	FC Fălești (3)
FC Cotiujenii Mari (3)	0–2	FC Florești (3)
FC Bogzești (3)	0–2	FC Telenești (3)
FC Cruiz (3)	0–2	CS Intersport Sănătăuca (3)
FC Boldurești (3)	3–0	FC Codru Junior (3)
Anina-ȘS Anenii Noi (3)	3–4	Sinteza Căușeni (3)
FC Sireți (3)	1–0	CFR Ialoveni (3)
CS Politeh Chișinău (3)	5–3 (a.e.t.)	CSF Cricova (3)
FC Trachia Taraclia (3)	1–1 (4–2 p)	FC Slobozia Mare (3)
CF Sparta (3)	2–1	FC Maiak Chirsova (3)
FC Congaz (3)	0–5	FC Cahul-2005 (3)

== Second preliminary round ==
Entering this round are 6 clubs from the Moldovan "B" Division. These matches took place on 29, 30 August 2015.

Team 1	Score	Team 2
FC Grănicerul (3)	1–3	FC Sîngerei (3)
FC Boldurești (3)	1–2	Sinteza Căușeni (3)
CF Sparta (3)	0–1	FC Cahul-2005 (3)

== First round ==
Entering this round are 22 clubs from the Moldovan "B" Division and Moldovan "A" Division. These matches took place on 13 September 2015.

Team 1	Score	Team 2
FC Sîngerei (3)	1–1 (3–4 p)	Victoria Chișinău (2)
CS Drochia (3)	0–0 (3–4 p)	FC Edineț (2)
FC Floreşti (3)	1–4 (a.e.t.)	CF Ungheni (2)
FC Teleneşti (3)	1–1 (5–6 p)	FC Codru Lozova (2)
CS Intersport Sănătăuca (3)	0–0 (4–2 p)	FC Iskra-Stal (2)
Sinteza Căușeni (3)	1–3	Intersport-Aroma (2)
Politeh Chişinău (3)	5–1	FC Real-Succes (2)
FC Dava Soroca (3)	0–3	FC Spicul Chișcăreni (2)
FC Sireți (3)	2–1	FC Sfîntul Gheorghe (2)
FC Trachia Taraclia (3)	0–4	CF Găgăuzia (2)
FC Cahul-2005 (3)	5–2	FC Prut Leova (2)

== Second round ==
Entering this round are 10 clubs from the Moldovan "B" Division and Moldovan "A" Division. These matches took place on 22 and 23 September 2015.

Team 1	Score	Team 2
FC Petrocub (1)	4–0	Victoria Chișinău (2)
CF Ungheni (2)	1–0 (a.e.t.)	FC Edineț (2)
FC Sireți (3)	2–3	CF Găgăuzia (2)
FC Politehnica Chișinău (3)	0–6	Intersport-Aroma Cobusca Nouă (2)
Speranța Nisporeni (1)	5–0	FC Cahul-2005 (3)

22 September 2015	FC Petrocub (1)	4–0	Victoria Chișinău (2)	Hîncești
	Ambros 5'; Șumchin 21', 75'; Barcari 45'			Stadium: Stadionul Municipal; Referee: Petru Stoianov

22 September 2015	CF Ungheni (2)	1–0 (a.e.t.)	FC Edineț (2)	Zagarancea
	C. Chirilov (?)			Stadium: Zagarancea Stadium

22 September 2015	FC Sireți (3)	2–3	CF Găgăuzia (2)	Sireți
	Bulat 18'; Lazari 36'		Calaraș 19'; Dobrioglo 47', 66'	Stadium: Hârtop Stadium

23 September 2015	FC Politehnica Chișinău (3)	0–6	Intersport-Aroma Cobusca Nouă(2)	Chişinău
				Stadium: Complexul Sportiv al Tineretului UTM

23 September 2015	Speranța Nisporeni (1)	5–0	FC Cahul-2005 (3)	Nisporeni
	Grosu 10'; Dima 32'; Reindorf 36'; Onicaș 39'; Jalbă 43'			Stadium: Stadionul Mircea Eliade

== Third round ==
Entering this round are 16 clubs from the Moldovan National Division and Moldovan "A" Division. These matches took place on 27 and 28 October 2015.

Team 1	Score	Team 2
Zaria Bălți (1)	3–0	CF Găgăuzia (2)
Intersport Sănătăuca (3)	1–6	FC Milsami Orhei (1)
Spicul Chișcăreni (2)	2–2 (a.e.t.) (3–5 p)	Academia Chișinău (1)
FC Sheriff Tiraspol (1)	8–1	Intersport-Aroma Cobusca Nouă (2)
FC Saxan (1)	0–0 (a.e.t.) (7–6 p)	Speranța Nisporeni (1)
Dinamo-Auto Tiraspol (1)	5–1	FC Codru Lozova (2)
CF Ungheni (2)	0–3	Dacia Chișinău (1)
Zimbru Chișinău (1)	3–0	Petrocub Hîncești (1)

27 October 2015	Zaria Bălți (1)	3–0	CF Găgăuzia (2)	Bălți
	Dao 23'; Oshchypko 70'; Yakovlyev 79'			Stadium: Stadionul Orășenesc

27 October 2015	Intersport Sănătăuca (3)	1–6	FC Milsami Orhei (1)	Rîbnița
	Luzan 47'		Suvorov 14'; Dulghier 16'; Cojocari 34'; Andronic 51'; Ovye Monday 72'; Zarichnyuk 88'	Stadium: Stadionul Orășenesc

27 October 2015	Spicul Chișcăreni (2)	2–2 (a.e.t.) (3–5 p)	Academia Chișinău (1)	Sîngerei
	Molla 12'; S. Luca 16'		Pașcenco (pen.); Popovici 65'	Stadium: Sîngerei Stadium

27 October 2015	FC Sheriff Tiraspol (1)	8–1	Intersport-Aroma Cobusca Nouă (2)	Tiraspol
	Juninho Potiguar 3', 21', 28', 58'; Rebenja 32', 63'; Iurcu 37'; Cobeț 83'		Guja 38'	Stadium: Sheriff Stadium; Referee: Ruslan Muntean

28 October 2015	CF Ungheni (2)	0–3	Dacia Chișinău (1)	Ungheni
			Onofrei 22'; Bursuc 76'; Pavlov 83'	Stadium: Ungheni Stadium; Referee: Ion Arnaut

28 October 2015	Dinamo-Auto Tiraspol (1)	5–1	Codru Lozova (2)	Tîrnauca
	V. Ivanov 8', 45'; Cemîrtan 22', 58' (pen.); Pîslă 79'		I. Cebotari 71'	Stadium: Dinamo-Auto Stadium; Referee: V. Banari

28 October 2015	FC Saxan (1)	0–0 (a.e.t.) (7–6 p)	Speranța Nisporeni (1)	Ceadîr-Lunga
				Stadium: Ceadîr-Lunga Stadium; Referee: V. Găinа
	Penalties
	Arabadji (penalty scored); Taşkın (penalty scored); Bulat (penalty scored); Truhanov (penalty scored); Puntus (penalty scored); Goginashvili (penalty scored); Semirov (penalty scored)		Ochincă (penalty scored); Maxim (penalty scored); Șeroni (penalty scored); Efros (penalty scored); Pavlov (penalty scored); Andronic (penalty scored)

28 October 2015	Zimbru Chișinău (1)	3–0	Petrocub Hîncești (1)	Chișinău
	Hélio 5'; Alex Bruno 41', 70'			Stadium: Zimbru Stadium

== Quarterfinals ==
Entering this round are 8 clubs from the Moldovan National Division. These matches took place on 19 and 20 April 2016.

Team 1	Score	Team 2
Dacia Chișinău (1)	1–0	Zimbru Chișinău (1)
Dinamo-Auto Tiraspol (1)	0–3	Milsami Orhei (1)
Sheriff Tiraspol (1)	1–0	Academia Chișinău (1)
Zaria Bălți (1)	5–1	FC Saxan (1)

19 April 2016	Zaria Bălți (1)	5–1	FC Saxan (1)	Bălți
16:30	Boychuk 2'; Onica 27'; Boghiu 73', 79'; Yakovlyev 77'	Report (in Russian)	Sandu 85'	Stadium: Stadionul Orășenesc; Attendance: 1,500; Referee: Piotr Stoianov (Taraclia)

19 April 2016	Dacia Chișinău (1)	1–0	Zimbru Chișinău (1)	Speia
16:30	Onofrei 22'	Report (in Russian)		Stadium: Stadionul Moldova; Attendance: 400; Referee: Alexandru Tean (Bălți)

19 April 2016	Sheriff Tiraspol (1)	1–0	Academia Chișinău (1)	Tiraspol
17:00	Ivančić 5'	Report (in Russian)		Stadium: Malaya Sportivnaya Arena; Attendance: 3,000; Referee: Andrei Cojocaru (Chișinău)

20 April 2016	Dinamo-Auto Tiraspol (1)	0–3	Milsami Orhei (1)	Tîrnauca
14:30		Report (in Russian)	Cojocari 12'; Antoniuc 64'; Dulghier 69'	Stadium: Dinamo-Auto Stadium; Attendance: 150; Referee: Gheorghe Malinovschi (Chișinău)

== Semifinals ==
These matches took place on 10 May 2016.

Team 1	Score	Team 2
Milsami Orhei (1)	1–0 (a.e.t.)	Dacia Chișinău (1)
Sheriff Tiraspol (1)	1–2 (a.e.t.)	Zaria Bălți (1)

10 May 2016	Milsami Orhei (1)	1–0 (a.e.t.)	Dacia Chișinău (1)	Orhei
16:30	Sidorenco 92'	Report (in Russian)		Stadium: CSR Orhei; Attendance: 2.000; Referee: Gheorghe Malinovschi (Chișinău)

10 May 2016	Sheriff Tiraspol (1)	1–2 (a.e.t.)	Zaria Bălți (1)	Tiraspol
	Gînsari 90+5'	Report (in Russian)	Slinkin 63'; Boghiu 108'	Stadium: Sheriff Stadium; Attendance: 2.500; Referee: Viorel Gaina (Chișinău)

== Final ==
The final was scheduled to be played on 25 May 2016 at Zimbru Stadium. The "home" team (for administrative purposes) was determined by an additional draw held on 12 May 2016.

Team 1	Score	Team 2
Milsami Orhei (1)	0–1 (a.e.t.)	Zaria Bălți (1)

25 May 2016	Milsami Orhei (1)	0–1 (a.e.t.)	Zaria Bălți (1)	Chișinău
		Report (in Russian)	Gheorghe Boghiu 99'	Stadium: Zimbru Stadium; Referee: Paweł Raczkowski (Poland)

== Top goalscorers ==
Updated to matches played on 26 May 2016.

Rank	Player	Club	Goals
1	(Brazil) Juninho Potiguar	FC Sheriff Tiraspol	4
1	(Moldova) Gheorghe Boghiu	Zaria Bălți	4
3	(Moldova) Eugeniu Rebenja	FC Sheriff Tiraspol	2
3	(Moldova) Vladislav Ivanov	Dinamo-Auto	2
3	(Moldova) Vadim Cemîrtan	Dinamo-Auto	2
3	(Brazil) Alex Bruno	Zimbru Chișinău	2
3	(Ukraine) Andriy Yakovlyev	Zaria Bălți	2
3	(Moldova) Octavian Onofrei	Dacia Chișinău	2
3	(Moldova) Andrei Cojocari	Milsami Orhei	2
3	(Moldova) Alexandru Dulghier	Milsami Orhei	2

=== Hat-tricks ===
Player	Home	Away	Result	Date
(Brazil) Juninho Potiguar^{4}	Sheriff Tiraspol	Intersport-Aroma	8–1	28 October 2015

Note

^{4} Player scored 4 goals
