= 1992 Moldovan Cup =

Cupa Moldovei

Tournament details
- Country: Moldova

Final positions
- Champions: Bugeac
- Runners-up: Tiligul

The 1992 Moldovan Cup was the first season of the Moldovan annual football cup competition. The competition ended with the final held on 9 May 1992.

== Round of 16 ==
Team 1	Agg.	Team 2	1st leg	2nd leg
Moldova	1–5	Bugeac	1–4	0–1
Constructorul	2–5	Universul	2–1	0–4
Zimbru	7–1	Automobilist	4–1	3–0
Nistru Cioburciu	5–1	Motor	3–0	2–1
Speranța	2–3	Nistru Otaci	1–0	1–3
Amocom	0–5	Tiligul	0–0	0–5
Codru	3–5	Tricon	2–2	1–3
Dinamo-Codru	0–4	Tighina	0–4	0–0

== Quarter-finals ==
Team 1	Agg.	Team 2	1st leg	2nd leg
Bugeac	1–1 (a)	Zimbru	0–0	1–1
Nistru Otaci	4–4 (a)	Tricon	3–2	1–2
Universul	3–3 (a)	Nistru Cioburciu	3–1	0–2
Tiligul	5–0	Tighina	3–0	2–0

== Semi-finals ==
Team 1	Agg.	Team 2	1st leg	2nd leg
Bugeac	3–3 (p)	Tricon	2–1	1–2
Nistru Cioburciu	1–4	Tiligul	0–0	1–4

== Final ==
9 May 1992

Bugeac	5–0	Tiligul
Pocatilo 21', 32'; Alexandrov 48', 60'; A. Scala 89'	Report

Stadionul Republican, Chișinău
Attendance: 6,500
Referee: Efim Vîgovschi
