= Alexander Tolstikov =

Moldavan association football player

Personal information
- Full name: Alexander Tolstikov
- Date of birth: 25 January 1973 (age 53)
- Place of birth: Moldovan SSR, USSR
- Height: 1.70 m (5 ft 7 in)
- Positions: Forward; midfielder

Youth career
- Avtotreid Aksakovo

Senior career*
| Years | Team | Apps | (Gls) |
| 1992 | Olimpia Bălți | 12 | (0) |
| 1992–1993 | Moldova Boroseni | 36 | (1) |
| 1993–1996 | Torentul Chișinău | 47 | (9) |
| 1996–1997 | MHM-93 Chișinău | 17 | (4) |
| 1997 | Speranța Nisporeni | 14 | (1) |
| 1998 | Irtysh Tobolsk | 30 | (2) |
| 1999 | Volgar-Gazprom | 3 | (0) |
- * Club domestic league appearances and goals

Alexander Tolstikov (Romanian: Alexandru Tolsticov, Russian: Александр Николаевич Толстиков, romanized: Aleksandr Nikolayevich Tolstikov; born 25 January 1973) is a Moldovan and Russian football players' agent, entrepreneur and former footballer. As footballer, in 1990s Tolsticov has played as a forward and midfielder for several Moldovan and Russian clubs.

== Career ==
In 1992–1997 Tolstikov played in Moldovan National Division for Olimpia Bălți (1992), Moldova Boroseni (1992–1993), Torentul Chișinău (1993–1996), MHM-93 Chișinău (1996–1997), Speranța Nisporeni (1997). The 1998 season he spent in the second Russian division, at Irtysh Tobolsk, and in the summer of 1999 has played three matches for the Astrakhan club Volgar-Gazprom in first Russian division. Also he spent some time at the Bulgarian side Avtotreid Aksakovo.

In the early 2000s, he founded the first sports agency in the South-Eastern Asia, working in the Chinese Championship. In the mid 2000s he obtained a football players' agent license, from 2009 he is the owner of the D-Sports agency. In 2011—2012 he was the head of selection section of FC Krasnodar.

In 2015, he became owner of the Portuguese third division club União de Leiria.

Since November 2020, he served as the Technical Director of FC Krasnodar. Upon the expiration of his contract on June 30, 2023, he stepped down from the position.
