= Alexandru Curtianu =

Moldovan football player and manager (born 1974)

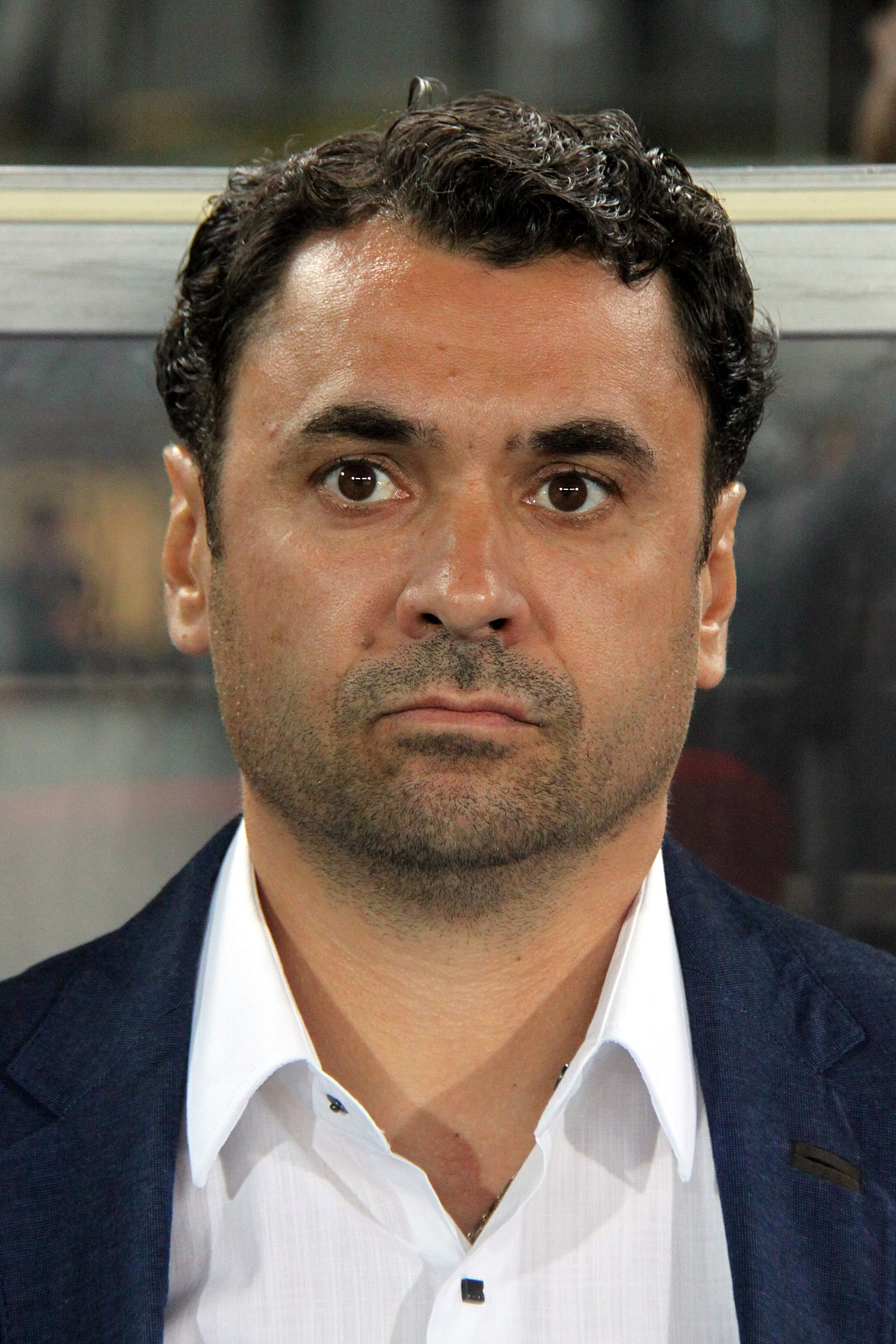
- Curtianu in 2015

Personal information
- Date of birth: 11 February 1974 (age 52)
- Place of birth: Chişinău, Moldavian SSR, Soviet Union
- Height: 1.78 m (5 ft 10 in)
- Position: Midfielder

Team information
- Current team: Atom Novovoronezh (manager)

Senior career*
Years	Team	Apps	(Gls)
1991–1997	Zimbru Chișinău	135	(27)
1997–1998	Widzew Łódź	25	(2)
1998	Zenit Saint Petersburg	26	(2)
1998–1999	Hamburger SV	8	(0)
1999–2000	Zenit Saint Petersburg	30	(5)
2000–2002	Zimbru Chişinău	16	(1)
2002	Torpedo-ZIL Moscow	9	(0)
Total		249	(37)

International career
1994–2002	Moldova	38	(2)

Managerial career
- 2007: Zimbru Chișinău (caretaker)
- 2009: Smena-Zenit St. Petersburg (assistant)
- 2010–2011: Moldova (assistant)
- 2011–2014: Moldova U21
- 2014–2015: Moldova
- 2016–2017: Jelgava
- 2018–2020: Panevėžys
- 2021–2022: Dynamo Saint Petersburg
- 2022–2023: Yadro Saint Petersburg
- 2024–: Atom Novovoronezh
- * Club domestic league appearances and goals

Alexandru Curtianu (born 11 February 1974) is a Moldovan professional football manager and former player who is currently in charge of Russian Amateur Football League club Atom Novovoronezh.

== Club career ==
He made his professional debut in the Soviet First League in 1991 for Zimbru Chișinău.

== International goals ==
Scores and results list Moldova's goal tally first.

No	Date	Venue	Opponent	Score	Result	Competition
1.	7 June 1995	Stadionul Republican, Chișinău, Moldova	Albania	1–1	2–3	Euro 1996 qualifier
2.	5 October 1996	Stadionul Republican, Chișinău, Moldova	Italy	1–1	1–3	1998 World Cup qualifier

== Managerial statistics ==
As of 28 June 2021

Team	From	To	Record				
Team	From	To	G	W	D	L	Win %
Zimbru Chișinău (caretaker)	20 April 2007	30 June 2007	9	6	0	3	66.67
Moldova U21	1 October 2011	24 September 2014	24	8	4	12	33.33
Moldova	24 September 2014	21 September 2015	12	1	5	6	8.33
Jelgava	21 December 2016	2 August 2017	17	6	2	9	35.29
Panevėžys	10 January 2018	15 June 2020	42	13	7	22	30.95
Dynamo Saint Petersburg	28 June 2021						
Total			104	34	18	52	32.69

== Honours ==
Zimbru Chișinău

- Moldovan National Division: 1992, 1992–93, 1993–94, 1994–95, 1995–96

Widzew Łódź

- Ekstraklasa: 1996–97

Zenit Saint Petersburg

- Russian Cup: 1998–99
