= 1992–93 Moldovan Cup =

Cupa Moldovei

Tournament details
- Country: Moldova

Final positions
- Champions: Tiligul
- Runners-up: Dinamo-Codru

The 1992–93 Moldovan Cup was the second season of the Moldovan annual football cup competition. The competition ended with the final held on 13 June 1993.

== Round of 16 ==
Team 1	Agg.	Team 2	1st leg	2nd leg
Tiligul	12–0	Universul	8–0	4–0
Constructorul	2–1	Tricon	2–0	0–1
Vilia	4–1	Nistru Cioburciu	3–0	1–1
Cristalul	0–1	Bugeac	0–1	0–0
Zimbru	0–1	Amocom	0–1	0–0
Olimpia	5–3	Speranța	1–0	4–3
Moldova	3–4	Nistru Otaci	1–1	2–3
Tighina	0–1	Dinamo-Codru	0–1	w/o

== Quarter-finals ==
Team 1	Agg.	Team 2	1st leg	2nd leg
Amocom	7–0	Vilia	2–0	5–0
Dinamo-Codru	5–2	Constructorul	2–0	3–2
Tiligul	3–2	Olimpia	1–0	2–2
Nistru Otaci	1–0	Bugeac	1–0	0–0

== Semi-finals ==
Team 1	Agg.	Team 2	1st leg	2nd leg
Tiligul	9–2	Nistru Otaci	8–1	1–1
Dinamo-Codru	4–3	Amocom	1–1	3–2

== Final ==
13 June 1993

Tiligul	1–0	Dinamo-Codru
Macari 70' (o.g.)	Report

Stadionul Republican, Chișinău
Attendance: 4,000
Referee: Tudor Cepoi
