= 1992 Moldovan "A" Division =

Moldovan "A" Division
- Season: 1992
- Champions: Nistru Otaci
- Promoted: Nistru Otaci; Universul Ciuciuleni; Nistru Cioburciu; Tricon Cahul

The 1992 Moldovan "A" Division was the 1st season of the Moldovan second-tier football league. A total of 11 teams contested the league.

== League table ==
| Pos | Team | Pld | W | D | L | GF | GA | GD | Pts | Promotion or relegation |
|---|---|---|---|---|---|---|---|---|---|---|
| 1 | Nistru Otaci (C, P) | 20 | 15 | 3 | 2 | 44 | 12 | +32 | 33 | Promotion to Divizia Națională |
| 2 | Valeologia Chișinău | 20 | 14 | 4 | 2 | 49 | 15 | +34 | 32 | |
| 3 | Universul Ciuciuleni (P) | 20 | 12 | 4 | 4 | 32 | 16 | +16 | 28 | Promotion to Divizia Națională |
| 4 | Nistru Cioburciu (P) | 20 | 9 | 9 | 2 | 32 | 18 | +14 | 27 | Promotion to Divizia Națională |
| 5 | Tricon Cahul (P) | 20 | 7 | 8 | 5 | 22 | 17 | +5 | 22 | Promotion to Divizia Națională |
| 6 | Izvoraș Drăsliceni | 20 | 6 | 6 | 8 | 22 | 23 | −1 | 18 | |
| 7 | Speranța Drochia | 20 | 7 | 2 | 11 | 23 | 29 | −6 | 16 | |
| 8 | Spicul Florești | 20 | 6 | 2 | 12 | 19 | 41 | −22 | 14 | |
| 9 | Delia Ungheni | 20 | 4 | 5 | 11 | 19 | 37 | −18 | 13 | |
| 10 | Vierul Sîngerei | 20 | 2 | 7 | 11 | 15 | 34 | −19 | 11 | |
| 11 | Vilia Briceni | 20 | 1 | 4 | 15 | 10 | 45 | −35 | 6 | |

Source: FootballFacts.ru (in Russian)
(C) Champions; (P) Promoted
