= 1992–93 Moldovan National Division =

Moldovan National Division
- Season: 1992–93
- Champions: Zimbru Chișinău
- Relegated: Tricon Cahul; Universul Ciuciuleni
- Matches played: 240
- Goals scored: 640 (2.67 per match)
- Top goalscorer: Vladimir Kosse (30)

Statistics of Moldovan National Division for the 1992–93 season.

== Overview ==
It was contested by 16 teams and Zimbru Chişinău won the championship.

== Teams ==
| Club | City | Stadium | 1992 season |
|---|---|---|---|
| Amocom Chișinău | Chișinău | | |
| Bugeac Comrat | Comrat | | |
| Agro Chișinău | Chișinău | | Changed name from Constructorul Chișinău |
| Cristalul Făleşti | Făleşti | | |
| Dinamo Chișinău | Chișinău | | Changed name from Dinamo-Codru Chisinau |
| Moldova Boroşeni | Boroseni | | |
| Olimpia Bălţi | Bălţi | | |
| Speranţa Nisporeni | Nisporeni | | |
| Tighina | Tighina | | |
| Tiligul Tiraspol | Tiraspol | | |
| Zimbru Chișinău | Chișinău | | Moldovan champions 1992 |
| Codru Călăraşi | Călăraşi | | Promoted |
| Nistru Cioburciu | Cioburciu, Ștefan Vodă | | Promoted |
| Nistru Otaci | Otaci | | Promoted |
| Tricon Cahul | Cahul | | Promoted |
| Universul Ciuciuleni | Ciuciuleni | | Promoted |

== League standings ==
| Pos | Team | Pld | W | D | L | GF | GA | GD | Pts | Qualification or relegation |
|---|---|---|---|---|---|---|---|---|---|---|
| 1 | Zimbru Chişinău (C) | 30 | 22 | 6 | 2 | 66 | 17 | +49 | 50 | Qualification for the Champions League qualifying round |
| 2 | Tiligul-Tiras Tiraspol | 30 | 20 | 7 | 3 | 80 | 28 | +52 | 47 | |
| 3 | Moldova Boroseni | 30 | 16 | 9 | 5 | 45 | 29 | +16 | 41 | |
| 4 | Bugeac Comrat | 30 | 16 | 8 | 6 | 38 | 21 | +17 | 40 | |
| 5 | Amocom Chişinău | 30 | 15 | 6 | 9 | 45 | 26 | +19 | 36 | |
| 6 | Codru Călăraşi | 30 | 15 | 4 | 11 | 42 | 44 | −2 | 34 | |
| 7 | Olimpia Bălţi | 30 | 14 | 6 | 10 | 40 | 28 | +12 | 34 | |
| 8 | Nistru Otaci | 30 | 12 | 8 | 10 | 45 | 54 | −9 | 32 | |
| 9 | Speranţa Nisporeni | 30 | 9 | 10 | 11 | 28 | 34 | −6 | 28 | |
| 10 | Agro Chișinău | 30 | 10 | 5 | 15 | 45 | 46 | −1 | 25 | |
| 11 | FC Tighina | 30 | 8 | 8 | 14 | 32 | 46 | −14 | 24 | |
| 12 | Nistru Cioburciu | 30 | 8 | 6 | 16 | 27 | 48 | −21 | 22 | |
| 13 | Dinamo Chişinău | 30 | 6 | 8 | 16 | 31 | 49 | −18 | 20 | |
| 14 | Cristalul Fălești | 30 | 7 | 4 | 19 | 30 | 58 | −28 | 18 | |
| 15 | Tricon Cahul (R) | 30 | 4 | 9 | 17 | 25 | 53 | −28 | 17 | Relegation to Division "A" |
| 16 | Universul Ciuciuleni (R) | 30 | 4 | 4 | 22 | 21 | 59 | −38 | 12 | Relegation to Division "A" |

Source: rsssf.com
(C) Champions; (R) Relegated

== Results ==
| Home \ Away | AGR | AMO | BUG | CFĂ | COD | DCH | MBO | OLI | NIC | NIS | SPE | TIG | TIL | TRI | UCI | ZIM |
|---|---|---|---|---|---|---|---|---|---|---|---|---|---|---|---|---|
| Agro Chișinău | | 4–1 | 1–0 | 1–3 | 0–2 | 4–1 | 1–2 | 1–0 | 2–1 | 6–0 | 1–2 | 2–2 | 0–0 | 0–4 | 3–0 | 1–4 |
| Amocom Chișinău | 2–1 | | 1–0 | 3–0 | 2–0 | 1–0 | 1–0 | 1–1 | 3–0 | 2–0 | 0–0 | 2–0 | 1–2 | 5–1 | 1–0 | 0–2 |
| Bugeac Comrat | 1–1 | 1–0 | | 4–1 | 2–0 | 1–0 | 0–1 | 2–0 | 3–0 | 1–0 | 3–1 | 1–1 | 0–0 | 2–1 | +:- (Note: The match between Bugeac Comrat and Universul Ciuciuleni was rated as a goalless win for home team.) | 2–2 |
| Cristalul Fălești | 0–2 | 0–4 | 0–2 | | 4–1 | 0–1 | 0–5 | 4–2 | 1–0 | 1–1 | 2–0 | 1–3 | 0–2 | 1–2 | 2–1 | 0–2 |
| Codru Călăraşi | 2–1 | 2–1 | 1–0 | 2–1 | | 1–0 | 4–1 | 0–1 | 2–1 | 2–2 | 2–1 | 4–2 | 0–4 | 4–2 | 3–1 | 1–5 |
| Dinamo Chișinău | 1–1 | 3–1 | 0–2 | 1–0 | 2–0 | | 0–0 | 1–2 | 1–3 | 3–3 | 0–2 | 2–1 | 1–2 | 0–1 | 3–2 | 0–1 |
| Moldova Boroseni | 1–1 | 1–1 | 2–1 | 2–1 | 2–2 | 3–2 | | 0–0 | 2–0 | 4–2 | 0–0 | 4–1 | 4–4 | +:- (Note: The match between Moldova Boroseni and Tricon Cahul was rated as a goalless win for home team.) | 3–0 | 1–0 |
| Olimpia Bălți | 4–1 | 1–0 | 1–1 | 4–0 | 2–0 | 2–2 | 0–1 | | 1–0 | 1–1 | 4–1 | 0–1 | 0–1 | 3–1 | 3–1 | 0–1 |
| Nistru Cioburciu | 3–1 | 1–4 | 0–1 | 2–1 | 1–2 | 1–1 | 2–0 | 0–2 | | 0–1 | 3–1 | 3–1 | 1–1 | 1–0 | 0–0 | 0–4 |
| Nistru Otaci | 1–0 | 1–4 | 1–2 | 3–1 | 2–1 | 4–0 | 1–2 | 2–1 | 1–0 | | 2–0 | 1–1 | 1–1 | 3–0 | 2–0 | 0–2 |
| Speranța Nisporeni | 1–0 | 0–2 | 0–1 | 1–1 | 0–0 | 2–0 | 1–1 | 1–0 | 1–1 | 1–2 | | 1–0 | 1–3 | 3–0 | 0–0 | 0–0 |
| FC Tighina | 2–0 | 1–1 | 2–0 | 0–0 | 1–0 | 1–1 | 1–0 | 2–3 | 0–0 | 4–1 | 0–1 | | 0–1 | 1–0 | 0–1 | 1–3 |
| Tiligul-Tiras Tiraspol | 2–0 | 1–0 | 2–2 | 4–1 | 1–1 | 3–1 | 0–1 | 2–0 | 4–0 | 10–2 | 1–3 | 4–1 | | 9–0 | 3–0 | 2–4 |
| Tricon Cahul | 0–1 | 0–0 | 0–0 | 0–0 | 0–1 | 2–2 | 0–0 | 0–1 | 1–1 | 1–1 | 2–2 | 1–1 | 1–5 | | 3–1 | 0–1 |
| Universul Ciuciuleni | 0–7 | 1–1 | 1–2 | 0–2 | 1–2 | 3–2 | 0–1 | 0–1 | 0–2 | 2–3 | 0–0 | 2–1 | 2–5 | 2–1 | | 0–2 |
| Zimbru Chișinău | 4–1 | 2–0 | 1–1 | 3–2 | 1–0 | 0–0 | 3–1 | 0–0 | 6–0 | 1–1 | 3–1 | 6–0 | 0–1 | 2–1 | 1–0 | |

Source: EU-Football.info
Legend: Blue = home team win; Yellow = draw; Red = away team win.
