= 1993–94 Moldovan Cup =

Cupa Moldovei

Tournament details
- Country: Moldova

Final positions
- Champions: Tiligul
- Runners-up: Nistru Otaci

The 1993–94 Moldovan Cup was the third season of the Moldovan annual football cup competition. The competition ended with the final held on 29 May 1994.

== Round of 16 ==
Team 1	Agg.	Team 2	1st leg	2nd leg
Sportul	2–2 (a)	Constructorul	0–0	2–2
Zimbru	3–1	Tighina	3–1	0–0
Agro	0–5	MHM-93	0–3	0–2
Bucuria	1–9	Nistru Otaci	1–4	0–5
Dinamo-Codru	1–2	Olimpia	1–0	0–2
Sinteza	2–4	Nistru Cioburciu	2–1	0–3
Vilia	1–4	Bugeac	1–2	0–2
Tiligul	9–2	Izvoraș	4–0	5–2

== Quarter-finals ==
Team 1	Agg.	Team 2	1st leg	2nd leg
Sportul	2–2 (a)	Bugeac	1–0	1–2
Olimpia	0–2	Nistru Otaci	0–1	0–1
Zimbru	4–0	MHM-93	2–0	2–0
Nistru Cioburciu	0–12	Tiligul	0–4	0–8

== Semi-finals ==
Team 1	Agg.	Team 2	1st leg	2nd leg
Sportul	2–2 (a)	Nistru Otaci	2–1	0–1
Zimbru	1–3	Tiligul	1–1	0–2

== Final ==
29 May 1994

Tiligul	1–0 (a.e.t.)	Nistru Otaci
Cosse 94' (pen.)	Report

Stadionul Republican, Chișinău
Attendance: 5,500
Referee: Vladimir Antonov
