= 2013–14 Moldovan "B" Division =

Moldovan "B" Division
- Season: 2013–14

The 2013–14 Moldovan "B" Division season was the 23rd since its establishment. It operated under an approved new system with three divisions, thus coming back to the system that was used between the 1993–94 and 1995–96 seasons.

== Final standings ==
=== Center ===
Pos	Team	Pld	W	D	L	GF	GA	GD	Pts	Promotion
1	CSF Speranța (C, P)	16	12	0	4	43	16	+27	36	Promotion to Divizia A
2	CFR Ialoveni	16	11	3	2	37	18	+19	36	
3	Codru Junior	16	9	3	4	30	16	+14	30	
4	Real Succes-2	16	9	2	5	42	28	+14	29	
5	Sinteza Căușeni	16	7	4	5	40	30	+10	25	
6	CSF Cricova	16	7	3	6	27	37	−10	24	
7	Codru Călărași	16	4	3	9	33	43	−10	15	
8	Olan Olanești	16	2	0	14	11	46	−35	6	
9	Universitatea Agrara	16	1	2	13	18	57	−39	5	
–	FC Tighina	0	0	0	0	0	0	0	0	withdrew

Source: Moldovan Football Federation (in Romanian)
Rules for classification: 1st points; 2nd head-to-head points; 3rd head-to-head goal difference; 4th goal difference; 5th goals scored; 6th number of wins; 7th Fair play competition
(C) Champions; (P) Promoted

=== North ===
Pos	Team	Pld	W	D	L	GF	GA	GD	Pts	Promotion
1	FC Budăi (C, P)	18	13	4	1	43	11	+32	43	Promotion to Divizia A
2	FC Sîngerei	18	11	4	3	28	11	+17	37	
3	FC Florești	18	8	5	5	33	28	+5	29	
4	FC Dava Soroca	18	7	4	7	24	34	−10	25	
5	FC Iskra Râbnița	18	7	3	8	30	32	−2	24	
6	CF Ungheni	18	6	5	7	39	32	+7	23	
7	FC Fălești	18	5	6	7	21	30	−9	21	
8	FC Telenești	18	3	7	8	15	20	−5	16	
9	CS Drochia	18	5	1	12	16	38	−22	16	
10	FC Grănicerul	18	3	5	10	29	42	−13	14	

Source: Moldovan Football Federation (in Romanian)
Rules for classification: 1st points; 2nd head-to-head points; 3rd head-to-head goal difference; 4th goal difference; 5th goals scored; 6th number of wins; 7th Fair play competition
(C) Champions; (P) Promoted

=== South ===
Pos	Team	Pld	W	D	L	GF	GA	GD	Pts	Promotion
1	Rapid-2 Petrocub (C, P)	16	13	0	3	45	12	+33	39	Promotion to Divizia A
2	FC Comrat	16	12	2	2	46	16	+30	38	
3	FC Cahul-2005	16	10	2	4	38	18	+20	32	
4	Dinamo-Auto 2 Tiraspol	16	9	0	7	26	22	+4	27	
5	FC Prut	16	7	3	6	26	23	+3	24	
6	Anina-ȘS Anenii Noi	16	4	4	8	25	34	−9	16	
7	CF Sparta Selemet	16	4	0	12	15	39	−24	12	
8	FC Maiak Chirsova	16	2	3	11	31	43	−12	9	
9	FC Congaz	16	2	2	12	17	68	−51	8	

Source: Moldovan Football Federation (in Romanian)
Rules for classification: 1st points; 2nd head-to-head points; 3rd head-to-head goal difference; 4th goal difference; 5th goals scored; 6th number of wins; 7th Fair play competition
(C) Champions; (P) Promoted
