= 1994–95 Moldovan Cup =

Cupa Moldovei

Tournament details
- Country: Moldova

Final positions
- Champions: Tiligul
- Runners-up: Zimbru

The 1994–95 Moldovan Cup was the fourth season of the Moldovan annual football cup competition. The competition ended with the final held on 21 May 1995.

== Round of 16 ==
Team 1	Agg.	Team 2	1st leg	2nd leg
Zimbru	4–0	Spicul	2–0	2–0
Tiligul	13–2	Leova	4–1	9–1
Constructorul	6–0	Sportul	3–0	3–0
Olimpia	1–0	Agro	1–0	0–0
Codru	2–1	Speranța	1–1	1–0
MHM-93	4–2	Torentul	2–1	2–1
Bugeac	1–0	Prut	0–0	1–0
Nistru	w/o	Tighina		

== Quarter-finals ==
Team 1	Agg.	Team 2	1st leg	2nd leg
Constructorul	1–6	Tiligul	0–4	1–2
Olimpia	1–4	Zimbru	0–3	1–1
Nistru	1–1 (a)	MHM-93	1–1	0–0
Codru	w/o	Bugeac		

== Semi-finals ==
Team 1	Agg.	Team 2	1st leg	2nd leg
MHM-93	0–3	Tiligul	0–0	0–3
Zimbru	4–1	Codru	4–0	0–1

== Final ==
21 May 1995

Tiligul	1–0	Zimbru
A. Stroenco 82'	Report

Stadionul Republican, Chișinău
Attendance: 6,000
Referee: Vladimir Antonov
