= 1993–94 Moldovan National Division =

Moldovan National Division
- Season: 1993–94
- Champions: Zimbru Chișinău
- Relegated: Vilia Briceni; Sinteza Căuşeni; Moldova Boroseni; Speranţa Nisporeni
- Matches played: 240
- Goals scored: 654 (2.73 per match)
- Top goalscorer: Vladimir Kosse (24)

Statistics of Moldovan National Division for the 1993–94 season. It was contested by 16 teams and Zimbru Chişinău won the championship.

== League standings ==
Pos	Team	Pld	W	D	L	GF	GA	GD	Pts	Qualification or relegation
1	Zimbru Chişinău (C)	30	25	2	3	86	22	+64	52	Qualification for the UEFA Cup preliminary round
2	Tiligul-Tiras Tiraspol	30	23	3	4	94	32	+62	49	Qualification for the Cup Winners' Cup qualifying round
3	Codru Călăraşi	30	15	10	5	47	22	+25	40	
4	Nistru Otaci	30	14	10	6	44	21	+23	38	
5	Olimpia Bălţi	30	13	8	9	35	41	−6	34	
6	Bugeac Comrat	30	14	5	11	42	36	+6	33	
7	Torentul Chişinău	30	10	9	11	34	30	+4	29	
8	Agro Chișinău	30	10	6	14	40	53	−13	26	
9	Amocom Chișinău	30	9	8	13	30	40	−10	26	
10	FC Tighina	30	9	8	13	43	55	−12	26	
11	Cristalul Făleşti	30	9	8	13	29	40	−11	26	
12	Nistru Cioburciu	30	8	8	14	36	47	−11	24	
13	Vilia Briceni (R)	30	9	5	16	27	52	−25	23	Relegation to Division "A"
14	Sinteza Căuşeni (R)	30	7	9	14	22	51	−29	23	Relegation to Division "A"
15	Moldova Boroşeni (R)	30	5	7	18	18	49	−31	17	Relegation to Division "A"
16	Speranţa Nisporeni (R)	30	5	4	21	27	63	−36	14	Relegation to Division "A"

Source: rsssf.com
(C) Champions; (R) Relegated

== Results ==
Home \ Away	AGR	AMO	BUG	COD	CFĂ	MBO	NIC	NIS	OLI	SCĂ	SPE	TIG	TIL	TOR	VIL	ZIM
Agro Chișinău		2–2	1–3	1–0	1–1	0–1	2–1	0–2	5–0	3–2	1–0	0–0	0–3	1–5	3–1	3–4
Amocom Chișinău	1–1		2–0	2–2	4–0	0–0	0–1	0–0	0–2	3–0	0–2	0–3	0–2	1–0	0–3	1–2
Bugeac Comrat	0–2	3–1		0–1	2–0	+:- (Note: The match between Bugeac Comrat and Moldova Boroseni was rated as a goalless win for home team.)	2–0	1–0	0–0	3–0	2–0	2–1	1–1	0–2	1–0	1–0
Codru Călăraşi	2–0	1–1	3–1		0–0	0–0	1–0	0–0	3–0	5–1	3–0	5–0	1–2	2–1	5–0	1–4
Cristalul Fălești	0–2	3–0	2–1	1–1		3–1	3–1	1–1	1–2	0–0	1–0	7–0	0–5	2–0	1–0	1–3
Moldova Boroseni	1–1	0–0	0–4	1–2	1–0		1–1	0–0	0–1	2–3	5–2	0–0	0–3	0–1	2–1	1–3
Nistru Cioburciu	3–2	0–2	1–1	1–1	2–0	3–0		0–2	4–0	0–0	5–1	1–1	0–3	0–0	0–1	1–4
Nistru Otaci	1–0	2–0	1–0	0–1	4–0	2–0	1–0		2–0	0–0	2–4	3–0	1–1	0–0	7–0	1–3
Olimpia Bălți	2–1	0–0	4–4	1–1	0–0	1–0	2–2	0–1		1–2	1–0	2–1	3–1	1–0	1–0	0–3
Sinteza Căușeni	1–3	0–2	2–1	0–0	0–1	3–0	1–0	0–0	1–3		1–0	0–0	1–4	0–0	2–1	0–1
Speranța Nisporeni	0–2	0–2	0–2	1–2	2–0	0–2	2–3	3–3	1–1	3–0		0–0	1–2	1–0	0–1	1–1
FC Tighina	1–0	2–1	2–0	2–1	1–1	3–0	2–3	2–6	0–1	4–2	5–1		1–3	1–2	0–0	1–3
Tiligul-Tiras Tiraspol	10–0	3–1	4–2	0–0	3–0	6–0	3–0	4–1	3–2	3–0	7–1	6–7		2–1	3–0	0–3
Torentul Chișinău	2–2	0–1	4–4	2–0	0–0	1–0	2–1	0–1	3–0	0–0	4–0	0–0	0–2		2–0	0–3
Vilia Briceni	2–1	1–3	0–1	0–1	1–0	1–0	1–1	0–0	0–2	0–0	2–1	2–1	5–4	2–2		1–2
Zimbru Chișinău	2–0	5–0	2–0	0–2	2–0	4–0	6–1	1–0	2–2	8–0	3–0	3–2	0–1	3–0	6–1	

Source: EU-Football.info
Legend: Blue = home team win; Yellow = draw; Red = away team win.
