= Cioburciu =

Cioburciu may refer to:

- Cioburciu, Ștefan Vodă, a village in Moldova
- Cioburciu, Transnistria, a village in Moldova / Pridnestrovian Moldavian Republic

== See also ==
- FC Nistru Cioburciu, a football club
- Constructorul Cioburcu, now FC Tiraspol, a football club
