= 1994–95 Moldovan National Division =

Moldovan National Division
- Season: 1994–95

Statistics of Moldovan National Division for the 1994–95 season.

== Overview ==
It was contested by 14 teams and Zimbru Chişinău won the championship.

== League standings ==
Pos	Team	Pld	W	D	L	GF	GA	GD	Pts	Qualification or relegation
1	Zimbru Chişinău (C)	26	21	4	1	69	10	+59	67	Qualification for the UEFA Cup preliminary round
2	Tiligul-Tiras Tiraspol	26	21	3	2	78	18	+60	66	Qualification for the Cup Winners' Cup qualifying round
3	Olimpia Bălţi	26	17	6	3	53	24	+29	57	
4	FC Tighina	26	18	2	6	44	18	+26	56	
5	Nistru Otaci	26	15	4	7	55	25	+30	49	
6	MHM-93 Chișinău	26	10	6	10	28	30	−2	36	
7	Bugeac Comrat	26	10	1	15	29	56	−27	31	
8	Agro Chișinău	26	8	6	12	24	37	−13	30	
9	Codru Călăraşi	26	8	5	13	26	38	−12	29	
10	Torentul Chișinău	26	6	5	15	24	44	−20	23	
11	Sportul Studențesc Chișinău	26	7	2	17	23	46	−23	23	
12	Progresul Briceni	26	7	2	17	22	56	−34	23	
13	Nistru Cioburciu	26	5	5	16	27	46	−19	20	
14	Cristalul Făleşti (R)	26	2	3	21	15	69	−54	9	Relegation to Division "A"

Source: rsssf.com
(C) Champions; (R) Relegated

== Results ==
Home \ Away	AGR	BUG	COD	CFĂ	MHM	NIC	NIS	OLI	PRO	SPO	TIG	TIL	TOR	ZIM
Agro Chișinău		0–2	3–2	3–1	0–1	1–0	0–3	0–1	2–1	2–0	0–0	1–1	0–4	2–3
Bugeac Comrat	2–1		3–0	1–0	0–3	3–0	0–1	0–4	4–0	3–1	0–3	0–1	3–0	0–5
Codru Călăraşi	1–1	5–0		3–0	0–2	1–0	0–1	1–1	0–0	4–1	0–2	0–2	3–0	0–0
Cristalul Fălești	2–1	0–2	-:+ (Note: The match between Cristalul Fălești and Codru Călăraşi was rated as a goalless win for away team.)		0–2	1–1	0–2	0–2	3–4	1–0	0–1	1–6	1–4	1–7
MHM 93 Chișinău	1–1	1–1	1–0	3–0		1–1	0–0	0–2	2–0	0–1	1–3	0–4	1–0	0–1
Nistru Cioburciu	1–2	6–1	0–1	1–1	2–0		0–4	3–3	0–2	3–0	1–0	1–2	1–0	0–2
Nistru Otaci	3–0	3–0	4–0	5–0	5–1	5–0		1–1	5–1	3–0	2–0	1–2	2–2	0–3
Olimpia Bălți	1–0	2–0	2–0	4–1	2–0	3–2	3–1		3–0	3–1	0–2	1–2	4–1	1–1
Progresul Briceni	3–1	2–0	0–1	1–0	0–3	0–0	1–2	0–3		3–1	0–5	0–1	1–0	0–1
Sportul Studentesc Chișinău	0–1	3–1	1–0	2–0	1–1	3–1	2–0	0–0	3–1		0–2	0–3	1–2	0–2
FC Tighina	1–1	3–1	3–0	3–1	2–1	2–0	1–0	1–2	1–0	2–1		0–1	3–0	1–0
Tiligul-Tiras Tiraspol	3–0	9–1	6–2	8–0	1–3	2–1	4–2	2–2	7–0	3–0	3–0		3–0	0–1
Torentul Chișinău	0–1	0–1	1–1	0–0	0–0	2–1	0–0	1–3	4–2	2–1	0–1	1–2		-:+ (Note: The match between Torentul Chișinău and Zimbru Chișinău was rated as a goalless win for away team.)
Zimbru Chișinău	0–0	3–0	4–1	3–1	3–0	4–1	4–0	4–1	4–0	3–0	3–1	0–0	8–0	

Source: EU-Football.info
Legend: Blue = home team win; Yellow = draw; Red = away team win.
