= 1992–93 Moldovan "A" Division =

Moldovan "A" Division
- Season: 1992–93
- Champions: Vilia Briceni
- Promoted: Vilia Briceni; Sinteza Căușeni

The 1992–93 Moldovan "A" Division season was the 2nd since its establishment. A total of 14 teams contested the league.

== League table ==
Pos	Team	Pld	W	D	L	GF	GA	GD	Pts	Promotion or relegation
1	Vilia Briceni (C, P)	26	17	3	6	71	22	+49	37	Promotion to Divizia Națională
2	Sinteza Căușeni (P)	26	15	6	5	56	26	+30	36	Promotion to Divizia Națională
3	Spumante Cricova	26	15	6	5	47	34	+13	36	
4	Speranța Drochia	26	12	10	4	35	21	+14	34	
5	Izvoraș Drăsliceni	26	13	7	6	53	29	+24	33	
6	Dumbrava Cojușna	26	11	7	8	48	37	+11	29	
7	Spicul Florești	26	11	7	8	45	42	+3	29	
8	Flacăra Carahasani	26	10	4	12	34	47	−13	24	
9	Locomotiva Basarabeasca	26	8	8	10	38	39	−1	24	
10	Vierul Sîngerei	26	10	3	13	35	46	−11	23	
11	Delia Ungheni	26	7	6	13	22	40	−18	20	
12	Tiras Criuleni	26	3	8	15	22	47	−25	14	
13	Sănătatia Sănătăuca	26	4	5	17	23	53	−30	13	
14	Haiducul Dubăsarii Vechi	26	2	8	16	22	68	−46	12	

Source: FootballFacts.ru (in Russian)
(C) Champions; (P) Promoted
