= Iurie Scala =

Association football player

Personal information
- Full name: Iurie Scala
- Date of birth: 12 April 1965 (age 61)
- Place of birth: Bilhorod-Dnistrovskyi, Ukrainian SSR
- Height: 1.76 m (5 ft 9 1/2 in)
- Positions: Forward; midfielder

Senior career*
Years	Team	Apps	(Gls)
1982–1983	SKA Kiev	0	(0)
1984	SKA Odessa		
1985	FC Chornomorets Odesa	0	(0)
1986	FC Tekstilshchik Tiraspol	4	(2)
1986	FC Nistru Chişinău	29	(1)
1987	FC Novator Zhdanov	3	(0)
1988	FC Tekstilshchik Tiraspol	1	(0)
1988	FC Neftyanik Fergana	28	(2)
1989	FC Nistru Chişinău	40	(6)
1990	FC Fakel Voronezh	11	(3)
1990	Kapaz PFK	3	(1)
1991	Tighina-Apoel Bender	9	(0)
1992	FC Nyva Ternopil	4	(0)
1992	Bugeac Comrat	17	(2)
1992–1993	Selena Bacău	13	(1)
1993	Bugeac Comrat	11	(1)
1994	FC Lada Togliatti	6	(0)
1994–1995	FC Lada Chernivtsi	6	(0)
1995	FC Zorya-MALS Luhansk	10	(0)
1995–1996	Constructorul Chişinău	9	(0)
1998–1999	FSC Bukovyna Chernivtsi	5	(0)

International career
1992	Moldova	7	(0)
- * Club domestic league appearances and goals

Iurie Scala (Ukrainian: Юрій Васильович Скала, Yuriy Vasylyovych Skala; born 12 April 1965) is a Moldovan former football player of Ukrainian descent. His twin brother, Alexei Scala, was also a footballer.

In 1992 Iurie Scala played seven matches for Moldova national football team.
