= Dmitri Mandrîcenco =

Moldovan footballer

Personal information
- Date of birth: 13 May 1997 (age 29)
- Place of birth: Tiraspol, Moldova
- Height: 1.88 m (6 ft 2 in)
- Position: Midfielder

Team information
- Current team: Dinamo Batumi
- Number: 7

Youth career
- 2011–2012: Sheriff Tiraspol
- 2013–2014: RVUFK Kyiv
- 2014–2015: Vorskla Poltava
- 2016–2017: Dynamo Kyiv

Senior career*
Years	Team	Apps	(Gls)
2015–2016	Dinamo-Auto Tiraspol	5	(1)
2017	Spicul Chișcăreni	9	(2)
2018–2020	Sfîntul Gheorghe	52	(11)
2018	→ Tighina (loan)		
2021	Saburtalo Tbilisi	33	(9)
2022–2023	Inhulets Petrove	0	(0)
2022	→ Motor Lublin (loan)	8	(0)
2023–2024	Dainava	37	(2)
2025–	Dinamo Batumi	45	(8)

International career^{‡}
- Moldova U17
2016	Moldova U19	2	(0)
2019	Moldova U21	2	(0)
2022–	Moldova	9	(1)
- * Club domestic league appearances and goals as of 12 July 2026 ‡ National team caps and goals as of 30 September 2026

Dmitri Mandrîcenco (born 13 May 1997) is a Moldovan professional footballer who plays as a midfielder for Erovnuli Liga club Dinamo Batumi and the Moldova national team.

== Club career ==
Mandrîcenco was born in Tiraspol, Moldova, and started his youth career with Sheriff Tiraspol. He later played youth football in Ukraine for RVUFK Kyiv, Vorskla Poltava and Dynamo Kyiv.

Mandrîcenco started his senior career at Dinamo-Auto Tiraspol, then joined Dynamo Kyiv, playing for the under-21 team. He returned to Moldova, playing for Spicul Chișcăreni and then for Sfîntul Gheorghe, reaching the final of the Moldovan Cup twice with the club. He moved to Georgia and Saburtalo Tbilisi in January 2021. On 15 April 2021 he scored a hat-trick in a 3–2 win over Samtredia in a Erovnuli Liga match. He helped the side win the Georgian Cup in the same year, scoring in the fourth round and the semi-finals, in a 1–0 win over Spaeri and a 2–1 win over Dinamo Batumi, respectively.

In January 2022, he joined Ukrainian side Inhulets Petrove. On 6 April 2022, Mandrîcenco went on loan to the Polish club Motor Lublin. In July 2023 he joined the Lithuanian side Dainava.

== International career ==
Having represented Moldova at under-17, under-19 and under-21 level, Mandrîcenco made his senior international debut for the country on 18 January 2022 against Uganda. Starting the match, he scored a goal after just 10 minutes of play.

== International goals ==
No.	Date	Venue	Opponent	Score	Result	Competition
1.	18 January 2022	Titanic Deluxe Belek Football Center, Belek, Turkey	Uganda	1–0	2–3	Friendly

== Personal life ==
Mandrîcenco holds both Moldovan and Ukrainian citizenship. He comes from a footballing family; his brother Constantin Mandrîcenco is a footballer, and his father Nicolae Mandrîcenco and his uncle Ivan Mandricenco were also footballers.

== Honours ==
Tighina

- Divizia B: 2018

Sfîntul Gheorghe

- Divizia Națională runner-up: 2019
- Moldovan Cup runner-up: 2018–19, 2019–20

Saburtalo Tbilisi

- Georgian Cup: 2021
