= Constantin Mandrîcenco =

Moldavian footballer

Personal information
- Full name: Constantin Mandrîcenco
- Date of birth: 19 February 1991 (age 35)
- Place of birth: Tiraspol, Moldova
- Height: 1.67 m (5 ft 5 1/2 in)
- Position: Midfielder

Team information
- Current team: Sevan
- Number: 23

Youth career
- Sheriff Tiraspol

Senior career*
Years	Team	Apps	(Gls)
2008–2010	Sheriff Tiraspol	19	(1)
2011	→ Mika (loan)	25	(4)
2012–2013	Tiraspol	4	(0)
2012–2013	→ Impulse (loan)	11	(0)
2013–2014	Ulisses	13	(0)
2014	Hapoel Afula	14	(1)
2014	Dinamo-Auto	11	(1)
2015	Dinamo Samarqand	4	(0)
2015–2018	Dinamo-Auto	35	(3)
2018	Speranța Nisporeni	2	(0)
2019–2020	Tighina		
2020	Floreşti		
2020–	Sevan	19	(0)

International career
2009–2012	Moldova U21		
- * Club domestic league appearances and goals as of 20:20, 24 May 2021 (UTC)

Constantin Mandrîcenco (born 19 February 1991) is a Moldovan footballer who plays for Armenian club Sevan FC as a midfielder. He has represented his country at under-21 international level.

He is a son of another footballer Nicolae Mandrîcenco. His brother Dmitri Mandrîcenco is also a footballer.
