= 1993–94 Moldovan "A" Division =

Moldovan "A" Division
- Season: 1993–94
- Champions: MHM-93 Chișinău
- Promoted: MHM-93 Chișinău

The 1993–94 Moldovan "A" Division season was the 3rd since its establishment. A total of 17 teams contested the league.

== League table ==
Pos	Team	Pld	W	D	L	GF	GA	GD	Pts	Promotion or relegation
1	MHM-93 Chișinău (C, P)	32	25	5	2	71	13	+58	55	Promotion to Divizia Națională
2	Codru Lozova	32	18	11	3	67	30	+37	47	
3	Spumante Cricova	32	20	4	8	71	34	+37	44	
4	Vierul Sîngerei	32	15	9	8	45	31	+14	39	
5	Gloria-Cvarq Edineț	32	16	5	11	50	28	+22	37	
6	Cahul	32	16	5	11	57	36	+21	37	
7	Raut Orhei	32	14	8	10	60	50	+10	36	
8	Izvoraș Drăsliceni	32	15	5	12	39	37	+2	35	
9	Spicul Sărata-Galbenă	32	12	7	13	52	49	+3	31	
10	Locomotiva Basarabeasca	32	11	9	12	38	39	−1	31	
11	Tiras Soroca	32	10	8	14	37	50	−13	28	
12	Delia Ungheni	32	8	11	13	36	39	−3	27	
13	Dumbrava Cojușna	32	8	7	17	41	65	−24	23	
14	Speranța Drochia	32	6	11	15	32	64	−32	23	
15	Flacăra Nimereuca	32	8	5	19	38	64	−26	21	
16	Spicul Florești	32	8	4	20	37	61	−24	20	
17	Universul Ciuciuleni	32	3	4	25	29	110	−81	10	

Source: FootballFacts.ru (in Russian)
(C) Champions; (P) Promoted
