= 1994–95 Moldovan "A" Division =

Moldovan "A" Division
- Season: 1994–95
- Champions: Constructorul Chișinău
- Promoted: Constructorul Chișinău; Speranța Nisporeni; Spumante Cricova

The 1994–95 Moldovan "A" Division season was the 4th since its establishment. A total of 19 teams contested the league.

== League table ==
Pos	Team	Pld	W	D	L	GF	GA	GD	Pts	Promotion or relegation
1	Constructorul Chișinău (C, P)	36	28	4	4	103	20	+83	88	Promotion to Divizia Națională
2	Speranța Nisporeni (P)	36	26	5	5	84	26	+58	83	Promotion to Divizia Națională
3	Spumante Cricova (P)	36	25	5	6	68	33	+35	80	Promotion to Divizia Națională
4	Gloria-Cvarq Edineț	36	22	7	7	70	32	+38	73	
5	Vierul Sîngerei	36	21	8	7	55	31	+24	71	
6	Locomotiva Basarabeasca	36	18	5	13	65	40	+25	59	
7	Bucuria Chișinău	36	15	9	12	57	42	+15	54	
8	Lims-Vital Anenii Noi	36	15	6	15	46	47	−1	51	
9	CSA Victoria Cahul	36	13	11	12	49	39	+10	50	
10	Ciuhur Ocnița	36	14	7	15	42	55	−13	49	
11	Dumbrava Cojușna	36	13	6	17	40	43	−3	45	
12	Migdal Carahasani	36	12	6	18	46	56	−10	42	
13	Prut Cantemir	36	10	8	18	46	57	−11	38	
14	Raut Orhei	36	11	5	20	40	64	−24	38	
15	Spicul Sărata-Galbenă	36	10	7	19	32	51	−19	37	
16	Delia Ungheni	36	10	5	21	40	62	−22	35	
17	Izvoraș Drăsliceni	36	10	4	22	41	73	−32	34	
18	Tiras Soroca	36	9	5	22	40	61	−21	32	
19	Codru Lozova	36	3	1	32	24	156	−132	10	

Source: FootballFacts.ru (in Russian)
(C) Champions; (P) Promoted
