= Valentina Sturza =

Valentina Scafaru-Sturza
- Born: 1929 (age 95–96); Ciuciuleni, Kingdom of Romania
- Known for: Head of the Association of Former Deportees and Political Detainees
- Parent(s): Alexandra Scafaru; Grigore Scafaru

Valentina Scafaru-Sturza (born 1929) is a Moldovan activist. She is the head of the Association of Former Deportees and Political Detainees.

== Biography ==
Valentina Sturza was born in Ciuciuleni to Alexandra Scafaru and Grigore Scafaru. After the Soviet occupation of Bessarabia and Northern Bukovina, she was loaded in cattle cars and deported to Sverdlovsk.

She is accountant-economist, the chair of the Association of Former Deportees and Political Detainees.

She was a candidate of the Party Alliance Our Moldova for July 2009 Moldovan parliamentary election.
