= Grigore Scafaru =

Romanian politician

Grigore V. Scafaru

Mayor of Ciuciuleni
- In office 1931–1940
- Preceded by: Teodor Ploscaru

Personal details
- Born: 1905 Ciuciuleni, Russian Empire
- Party: National Liberal Party
- Spouse(s): Alexandra Scafaru (born 1906, daughter of Teodor Ploscaru, mayor of Ciuciuleni)
- Children: Maria (b 1926); Valentina Scafaru-Sturza (b 1929); Fiodor (b 1932); Victor (b 1934)

Grigore V. Scafaru (born 1905, date of death unknown) was a Romanian politician from Bessarabia.

== Biography ==
Scafaru was born in Ciuciuleni. He served as mayor of Ciuciuleni and member of the Parliament of Romania. After the Soviet occupation of Bessarabia and Northern Bukovina, Grigore Scafaru was deported to Sverdlovsk. He was the father of Valentina Scafaru-Sturza, the chairwoman of the Association of Former Deportees and Political Detainees (Romanian: Asociaţia foştilor deportaţi şi deţinuţi politici).

== Awards ==
Scafaru was awarded the "Crucea de Aur" by Carol II of Romania.
