= 1995–96 Moldovan National Division =

Moldovan National Division
- Season: 1995–96

Statistics of Moldovan National Division (soccer/football) for the 1995–96 season.

== Overview ==
It was contested by 16 teams and Zimbru Chişinău won the championship.

== League standings ==
| Pos | Team | Pld | W | D | L | GF | GA | GD | Pts | Qualification or relegation |
|---|---|---|---|---|---|---|---|---|---|---|
| 1 | Zimbru Chişinău (C) | 30 | 26 | 3 | 1 | 110 | 11 | +99 | 81 | Qualification for the UEFA Cup preliminary round |
| 2 | Tiligul-Tiras Tiraspol | 30 | 24 | 2 | 4 | 95 | 21 | +74 | 74 | Qualification for the UEFA Cup preliminary round |
| 3 | Constructorul Chișinău | 30 | 24 | 2 | 4 | 71 | 16 | +55 | 74 | Qualification for the Cup Winners' Cup qualifying round |
| 4 | Agro Chișinău | 30 | 19 | 6 | 5 | 60 | 27 | +33 | 63 | |
| 5 | Olimpia Bălţi | 30 | 19 | 6 | 5 | 55 | 25 | +30 | 63 | |
| 6 | Nistru Otaci | 30 | 15 | 7 | 8 | 63 | 28 | +35 | 52 | |
| 7 | Spumante Cricova | 30 | 13 | 8 | 9 | 56 | 31 | +25 | 47 | |
| 8 | MHM 93 Chişinău | 30 | 13 | 6 | 11 | 43 | 26 | +17 | 45 | |
| 9 | Codru Călăraşi | 30 | 11 | 5 | 14 | 51 | 58 | −7 | 38 | |
| 10 | Sportul Chişinău | 30 | 10 | 4 | 16 | 50 | 53 | −3 | 34 | |
| 11 | Speranţa Nisporeni | 30 | 8 | 7 | 15 | 41 | 51 | −10 | 31 | |
| 12 | FC Tighina | 30 | 7 | 5 | 18 | 41 | 52 | −11 | 26 | |
| 13 | Torentul Chişinău (R) | 30 | 5 | 5 | 20 | 36 | 94 | −58 | 20 | Qualification for the relegation play-off |
| 14 | Nistru Cioburciu (R) | 30 | 3 | 7 | 20 | 24 | 84 | −60 | 16 | Qualification for the relegation play-off |
| 15 | Progresul Briceni (R) | 30 | 4 | 4 | 22 | 19 | 105 | −86 | 16 | Relegation to Division "A" |
| 16 | Bugeac Comrat (R) | 30 | 0 | 1 | 29 | 6 | 139 | −133 | 1 | Relegation to Division "A" |

Source: rsssf.com
(C) Champions; (R) Relegated

== Results ==
| Home \ Away | AGR | BUG | COD | CON | MHM | NCI | NIS | OLI | PRO | SPE | SPO | SPU | TIG | TIL | TOR | ZIM |
|---|---|---|---|---|---|---|---|---|---|---|---|---|---|---|---|---|
| Agro Chișinău | | 6–0 | 1–1 | 0–2 | 0–0 | 5–0 | 1–0 | 0–0 | 3–1 | 2–3 | 2–1 | 2–2 | +–- (Note: Match rated as a goalless win for home team.) | 2–1 | 5–0 | 1–3 |
| Bugeac Comrat | 0–5 | | 1–8 | 0–2 | 0–7 | 2–2 | 1–10 | -:+ (Note: Match rated as a goalless win for away team.) | 1–4 | 1–4 | 1–3 | 0–3 | 0–4 | -:+ | 0–7 | 0–4 |
| Codru Călăraşi | 1–1 | 6–0 | | 0–1 | 2–0 | 3–1 | 1–3 | 1–2 | 10–1 | 2–2 | 2–1 | 3–2 | 0–1 | 0–3 | 1–3 | 0–8 |
| Constructorul Chișinău | 4–0 | 5–0 | 6–0 | | +:- | 5–0 | 2–1 | 1–1 | 10–0 | 2–0 | 2–1 | 2–0 | 1–0 | 0–2 | 3–1 | 1–2 |
| MHM 93 Chișinău | 0–1 | 7–0 | 0–0 | 0–1 | | 1–1 | 0–1 | 0–0 | 1–0 | 2–1 | 3–0 | 1–0 | 1–0 | 1–5 | 5–1 | 0–3 |
| Nistru Cioburciu | 2–3 | 3–0 | 0–1 | 0–2 | 0–4 | | 0–4 | 1–3 | 3–2 | 1–0 | 1–2 | 0–6 | 2–2 | 2–5 | 0–0 | 0–1 |
| Nistru Otaci | 0–1 | 3–0 | 1–0 | 1–1 | 1–0 | 3–0 | | 2–2 | 9–0 | 4–2 | 4–0 | 0–0 | 3–2 | 1–2 | 3–0 | 0–1 |
| Olimpia Bălți | 0–1 | +:- | 3–0 | 1–0 | 1–0 | 4–0 | 1–0 | | 1–0 | 6–1 | 2–1 | 3–3 | 4–0 | 0–4 | 7–1 | 0–3 |
| Progresul Briceni | 0–3 | +:- | 1–0 | 1–2 | 1–4 | 2–2 | 1–1 | 0–3 | | 1–2 | 1–0 | 0–3 | 0–0 | -:+ | 0–5 | 0–2 |
| Speranța Nisporeni | 1–2 | 7–0 | 1–2 | 0–1 | 2–2 | 5–1 | 0–0 | 0–5 | +:- | | 1–1 | 0–1 | 1–0 | 0–1 | 2–2 | 0–2 |
| Sportul Chișinău | 1–2 | 4–0 | 2–0 | 1–2 | 1–2 | 4–0 | 1–1 | 0–2 | 13–0 | 0–0 | | 0–1 | 5–0 | 1–1 | 1–0 | 1–7 |
| Spumante Cricova | 0–4 | 9–0 | 1–1 | 1–2 | 0–1 | +:- | 0–2 | 1–1 | 2–1 | 0–0 | 4–1 | | 7–0 | 2–1 | 6–0 | 1–1 |
| FC Tighina | 0–2 | 6–0 | 1–4 | 0–3 | -:+ | 1–1 | 1–1 | 1–0 | 12–0 | 1–4 | 1–2 | 0–0 | | 0–2 | 3–0 | 0–1 |
| Tiligul-Tiras Tiraspol | 2–1 | 7–0 | 8–0 | 1–2 | 1–0 | 5–1 | 3–1 | 3–0 | 7–0 | 2–1 | 3–0 | 2–0 | 3–1 | | 13–1 | 0–2 |
| Torentul Chișinău | 1–3 | 5–0 | 0–1 | 0–6 | 1–1 | 0–0 | 0–3 | 0–1 | 2–2 | 3–1 | 1–2 | 0–1 | 2–3 | 0–6 | | 0–7 |
| Zimbru Chișinău | 1–1 | 8–0 | 3–1 | 2–0 | 2–0 | 9–0 | 5–0 | 1–2 | 4–0 | 4–0 | 8–0 | 3–0 | 3–1 | 2–2 | 8–0 | |

Source: EU-Football.info
Legend: Blue = home team win; Yellow = draw; Red = away team win.
