= Alexei Scala =

Moldovan football player (born 1965)

Personal information
- Full name: Alexei Scala
- Date of birth: 12 April 1965 (age 61)
- Place of birth: Bilhorod-Dnistrovskyi, Ukrainian SSR
- Height: 1.76 m (5 ft 9 1/2 in)
- Positions: Forward; midfielder

Senior career*
| Years | Team | Apps | (Gls) |
| 1982 | SKA Kyiv | 0 | (0) |
| 1985 | Chornomorets Odesa | 0 | (0) |
| 1986 | Tekstilshchik Tiraspol | 25 | (2) |
| 1987 | Novator Zhdanov | 2 | (0) |
| 1988 | Neftyanik Fergana | 14 | (2) |
| 1988 | Dzhezkazganets Dzhezkazgan | 12 | (2) |
| 1989 | Nistru Chișinău | 37 | (4) |
| 1990 | Kapaz PFK | 3 | (0) |
| 1990 | Fakel Voronezh | 10 | (1) |
| 1991 | Tighina-Apoel Bender | 15 | (1) |
| 1992 | Bugeac Comrat | 17 | (2) |
| 1992–1993 | Selena Bacău | 12 | (0) |
| 1993–1994 | Bugeac Comrat | 10 | (1) |
| 1993–1994 | Podillya Khmelnytskyi | 6 | (0) |
| 1995 | Bugeac Comrat | 8 | (3) |
| 1996 | Constructorul Chișinău | 8 | (0) |
| 1998 | Constructorul Chișinău | 1 | (0) |

International career
| 1992 | Moldova | 7 | (1) |
- * Club domestic league appearances and goals

Alexei Scala (Ukrainian: Алексей Васильович Скала, Aleksei Vasylyovych Skala; born 12 April 1965) is a Moldovan former professional footballer.

In 1992 Alexei Scala played seven matches for Moldova national football team, scoring one goal. He is the twin brother of Iurie Scala.

== International goals ==
Scores and results list Moldova's goal tally first.

| Goal | Date | Venue | Opponent | Score | Result | Competition |
|---|---|---|---|---|---|---|
| 1 | 18 August 1992 | Amman International Stadium, Amman, Jordan | Pakistan | 1–0 | 5–0 | Friendly (Jordan Tournament) |
