= Dumitru Popescu =

Dumitru Popescu may refer to:

- Dumitru Popescu (footballer, born 1942) (1942–1997), Romanian footballer
- Dumitru Popescu (footballer, born 1994), Moldavian footballer
- Dumitru Radu Popescu (1935–2023), Romanian writer and politician
- Dumitru Popescu-Colibași (1912–1993), handball coach
