= FC Moldova Boroseni =

Moldova Boroseni
- Full name: Fotbal Club Moldova Boroseni
- Founded: 1991
- Dissolved: 1994
- Ground: Stadionul Boroseni; Borosenii Noi, Moldova
- Capacity: 1,000
- 1993–1994: Moldovan National Division, 15th

FC Moldova Boroseni was a Moldovan football club based in Borosenii Noi, Moldova. Founded in 1991, the club played 3 seasons in the Moldovan National Division, the top division in Moldovan football. It was dissolved in 1994.

== Achievements ==
- Moldovan National Division

Third Place (1): 1992–93

== List of seasons ==
Season	League									Cup	Ref
Season	Division	Pos	Pld	W	D	L	GF	GA	Pts	Cup	Ref
1992	Divizia Națională	10th	22	7	2	13	22	42	16	Round of 16	
1992–93	Divizia Națională	3rd	30	16	9	5	45	29	41	Round of 16	
1993–94	Divizia Națională	↓ 15th	30	5	7	18	18	49	17	Round of 32	
