= Eugen Piunovschi =

Moldovan footballer and manager

Personal information
- Date of birth: 23 September 1946 (age 80)
- Place of birth: Irkutsk, Russian SFSR, Soviet Union
- Position: Forward

Senior career*
| Years | Team | Apps | (Gls) |
| 1967–1968 | Moldova | 26 | (1) |
| 1969–1970 | Shakhter Karagandy | 62 | (28) |
| 1971–1973 | Kairat | 72 | (13) |
| 1974–1977 | Nistru Chişinău | 132 | (49) |
| 1978–1980 | Tselinnik | ? | (43) |

Managerial career
- 1990–1991: Agros-Intex
- 1992–1993: Tighina
- 1992: Moldova
- 1994–1995: Bugeac Comrat
- 1995–: SDUSSOR Bronnitsy
- * Club domestic league appearances and goals

Eugen Piunovschi (Russian: Евгений Михайлович Пиуновский, born 23 September 1946) is a Russian-born Moldovan former footballer and former manager of the Moldova national team.

== Coaching career ==
After the end of his career as a footballer, he started working as a coach.

From 1992 to June 1993 he coached Tighina Bender's team.

Also, from 18 to 28 August 1992, he led the national team of Moldova. He was the head coach of the national team of Moldova, the team participated in the Jordanian tournament and took the third place.

In the 1993/94 season, he worked as the head coach of Bugeac Comrat. Then he worked for over 15 years at the Sports School in the city of Bronnitsy near Moscow

== Honours ==
=== Player ===
FC Kairat

- European Railways Cup: 1971

=== Manager ===
Moldova national team

- 1992 Jordan Tournament: Third place
