= Soviet deportations from Bessarabia and Northern Bukovina =

Population transfer in the Soviet Union

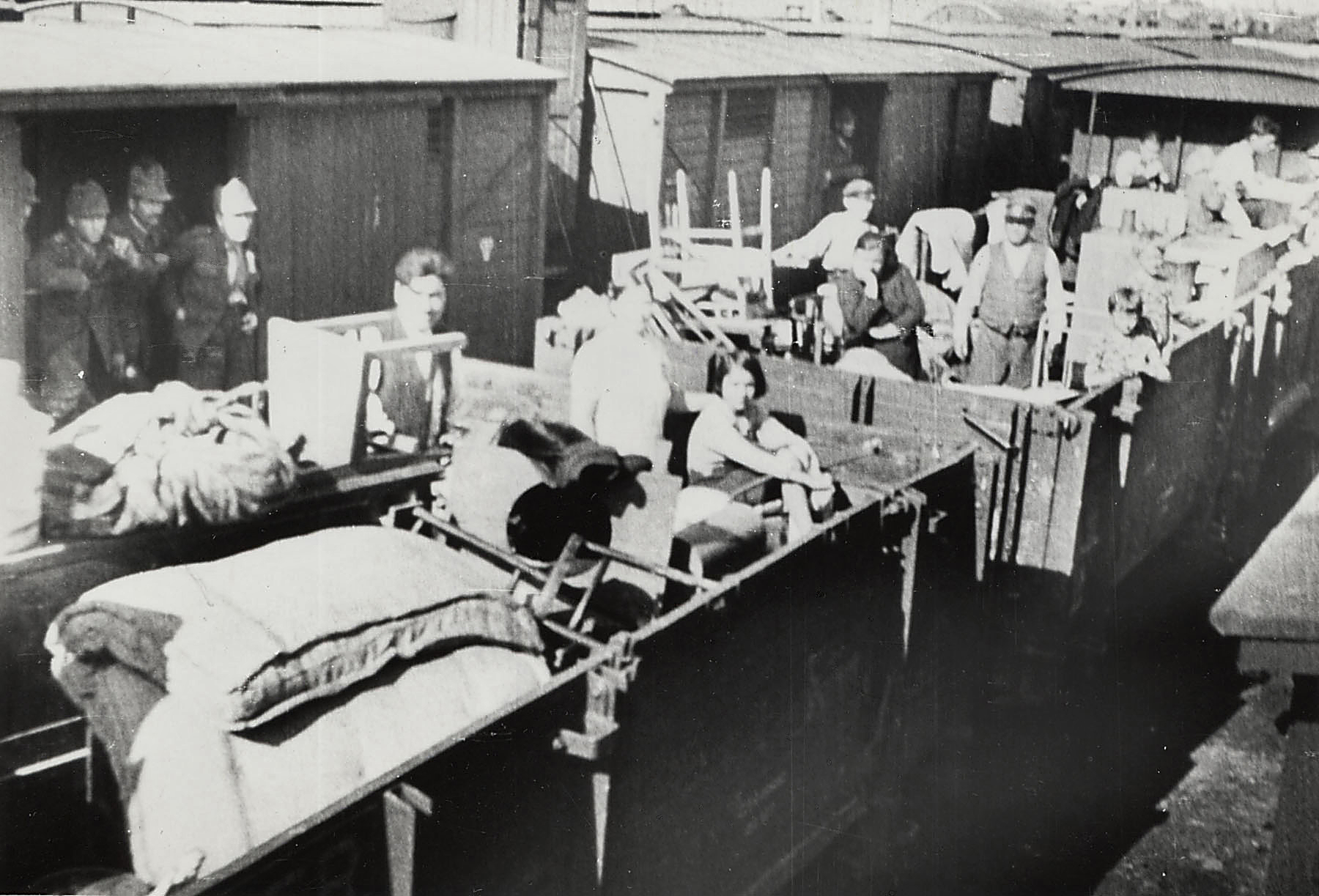
Romanian refugees after the Soviet occupation of Bessarabia and Northern Bukovina

The Soviet deportations from Bessarabia and Northern Bukovina took place between late 1940 and 1951 and were part of Joseph Stalin's policy of political repression of the potential opposition to the Soviet power. The deported were typically moved to so-called "special settlements".

The deportations began after the Soviet occupation of Bessarabia and Northern Bukovina, which occurred in June 1940. According to a secret Soviet Ministry of Interior report dated December 1965, 46,000 people were deported from the Moldavian Soviet Socialist Republic for the period 1940−1953.

Moldovan historian Ion Varta referred to the events that occurred in Bessarabia and Northern Bukovina after their occupation, including the deportations but also the famine and murders, as a "genocide in all law".

Around 7,500 Gagauz were deported to Siberia or Kazakhstan, according to estimates by Gagauz Moldovan researcher Konstantin Kurdoglo, author of a volume on the Soviet repressions and deportations in Gagauzia.

== 1941 ==
As a result of the Molotov–Ribbentrop Pact of August 1939, the Romanian government was forced to accept the Soviet ultimatum of June 26, 1940, and withdrew from Bessarabia and Northern Bukovina. These regions (as well as the Hertsa region) were then incorporated into the Soviet Union, most of the former being organized as the Moldavian SSR, while the other areas were attributed to the Ukrainian SSR.

On June 12–13, 1941, 29,839 members of families of "counter-revolutionaries and nationalists" from the Moldavian SSR, and from the Chernivtsi (of Northern Bukovina) and Izmail oblasts of the Ukrainian SSR were deported to Kazakhstan, the Komi ASSR, the Krasnoyarsk Krai, and the Omsk and Novosibirsk oblasts. For the fate of such a deportee from Bessarabia, see the example of Eufrosinia Kersnovskaya. The Georgian NKVD official Sergo Goglidze, trusted henchman of Lavrentiy Beria, was in charge of these deportations from Bessarabia and Northern Bukovina.

=== Labor mobilization ===
During 1940 and 1941, 53,356 people from Bessarabia and Northern Bukovina were mobilized for labour across the entire territory of the Soviet Union; though the mobilization was presented as voluntary, refusal to work could result in penal punishment, and living and working conditions were generally poor.

=== Aftermath ===
Professor Rudolph Rummel, based on older claims, estimated that in 1940–1941, 200,000 to 300,000 Romanian Bessarabians were persecuted, conscripted into forced labor camps, or deported with the entire family, of whom 18,000 to 57,000 did not survive. According to some estimates (as related by historian Pavel Moraru), 12% of the population of the two provinces was killed and deported in one year.

Such figures were not confirmed after the opening of Soviet archives: historian Igor Cașu indicated a figure of 86,604 people from Bessarabia, Northern Bukovina, and Hertsa Region who suffered political repression in 1940–1941, the greater part (53,000) being subjected to forced conscription for labour across the Soviet Union. Among the cca. 30,000 deportees, there were representatives from all ethnic groups: Romanians, Ukrainians, Russians, Jews, Bulgarians, Gagauz. Moldovans and Romanians comprised 50% of these, a proportion similar to their weight in the general population, leading Cașu to conclude that the prewar and postwar repressions were not directed at any specific ethnic or national group.

== 1942 ==
On June 22, 1941, Nazi Germany, together with several other countries, including Romania (which had the primary objective of reintegrating Bessarabia and Northern Bukovina into the Romanian state), attacked the Soviet Union (see Operation Barbarossa). After the start of the war, further deportations occurred in the USSR. In April 1942, Romanian deportees and some other nationalities were deported again from Crimea and the North Caucasus. In June 1942, Romanians and others were also deported from Krasnodar Krai and the Rostov Oblast.

== 1949 ==
On April 6, 1949, the Political Bureau of the Central Committee issued decision number 1290-467cc, which called for 11,280 families from Moldavian SSR to be deported as kulaks or collaborators with Nazi Germany during World War II. Ultimately, 11,239 families, comprising 35,050 people, were detained and deported on July 6, 1949, with the rest either escaping or being exempt due to their contribution to the Soviet war effort or their support for collectivisation. In an interpellation in the Parliament of Romania in 2009, international judge and politician Tudor Panțîru put the number of deportees from July 6–7 at 40,000.

== 1951 ==
On February 19, 1951, Viktor Abakumov delivered to Stalin a secret notice which listed the planned numbers of deported "Jehovists" from Ukraine, Belorussia, Estonia, Latvia, Lithuania and Moldova, with 1,675 people (670 families) listed for the latter. On March 3, the USSR Council of Ministers issued the corresponding decree, followed by an order of the Ministry of State Security of February 6. On March 24, the Council of Ministers of the Moldavian SSR issued the decree on the confiscation and selling of the property of the deportees. Operation North started at 4:00 am on April 1, 1951, and the round-ups continued until April 2. The deportees were classified as "special settlers". In total, from the Moldavian SSR, there were 723 families (2,617 people) deported on the night of March 31 to April 1, 1951, all members of neoprotestant sects, mostly Jehovah's Witnesses, and qualified as religious elements considered a potential danger for the Communist regime. In the previously mentioned interpellation, Panțîru claimed some 6,000 ethnic Romanians from the Moldavian SSR were deported to Central Asia on April 1, 1951.

== Legacy ==
- Association of Former Deportees and Political Detainees

== Memorial ==
A memorial to the victims of Stalinist repression has been erected in Chișinău, close to Central Station, to commemorate the deportations.

== Notable people that were deported or born in exile ==
- Alexandru Arseni (born 1952), Moldovan politician, born in Prigorodnoye, Kazakhstan
- Dumitru Diacov (born 1952), Moldovan politician, born in Kargapolye, Russia
- Max Diamant (c. 1880–1941), Bukovinian Jewish lawyer, activist and politician; died in Siberia during exile
- Mihai Dolgan (1942–2008), Moldovan singer and composer
- Zinaida Greceanîi (born 1956), Moldovan politician, born in Metallist, Tomsk Oblast, Russia
- Vladimir Hotineanu (1950–2019), Moldovan surgeon and politician, born in Kyzylorda, Kazakhstan
- Eufrosinia Kersnovskaya (1908–1994), Russian Gulag survivor and witness
- Vadim Mișin (1945–2016), Moldovan general-major of police and politician, born in Kulsary, Kazakhstan
- Anița Nandriș (1904–1986), Bukovinian Romanian peasant and Gulag survivor and witness
- Alexei Stârcea (1919–1974), Romanian and Soviet Moldovan composer and music professor

== Gallery ==
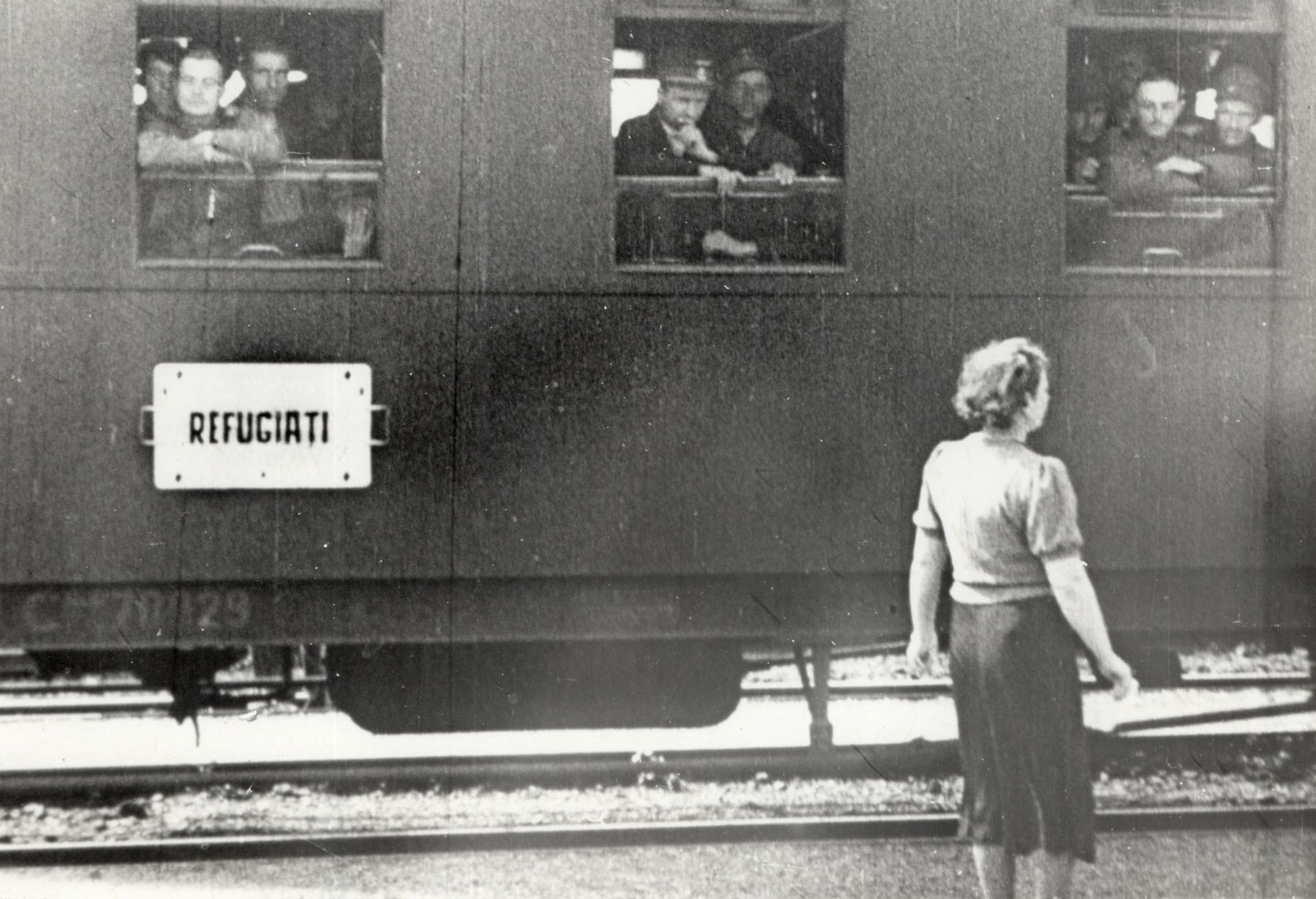
Train with deportees

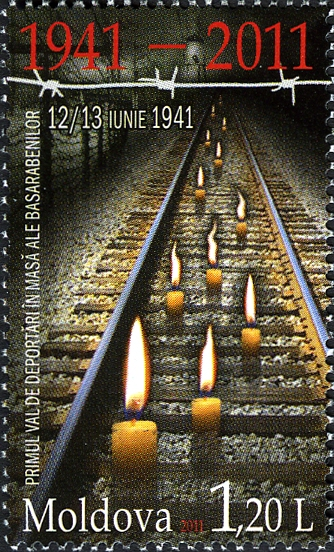
70 years since the first mass deportation of Bessarabians, 1941–2011. Post of Moldova 2011.

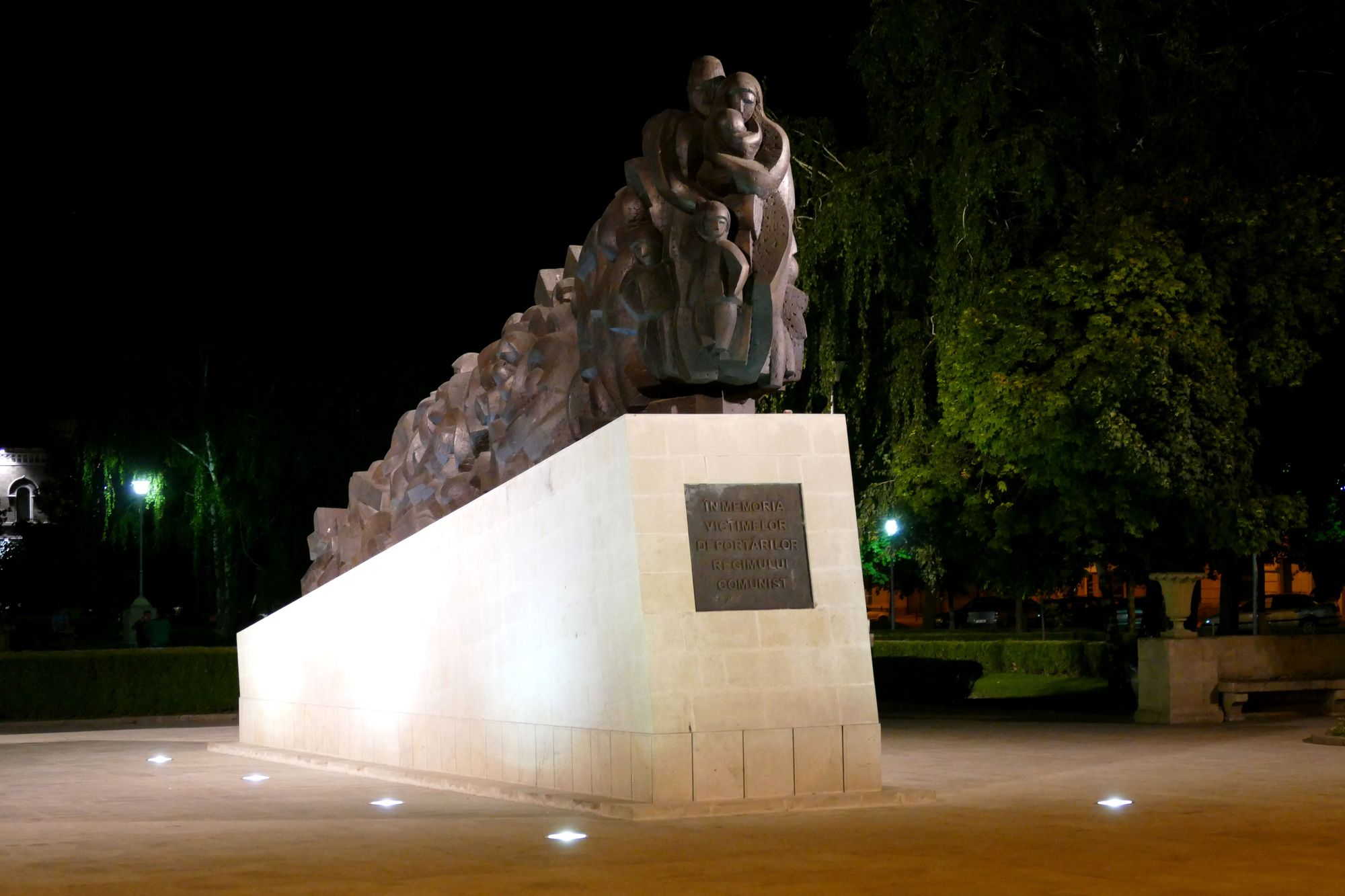
Monument to the deportees in front of the Chișinău Railway Station

== See also ==
- Vorkuta uprising
- Romanian prisoners of war in the Soviet Union
- Commission for the Study of the Communist Dictatorship in Moldova

== Bibliography ==
- Victor Bârsan, Masacrul inocenților, Bucharest, 1993, pp. 18–19
- Anton Antonov-Ovseenko, "The Time of Stalin", Harper and Row (in English)
- Johann Urwich-Ferry, "Ohne Passdurch die UdSSR", Editura "Gruparea Româno-Germană de studii", München, 1976–1978 (in German) "Fără pașaport prin URSS. Amintiri", Editura Eminescu, București, 1999 (in Romanian)
- Mawdsley, Evan (1998). The Stalin Years: The Soviet Union, 1929–1953. Manchester University Press. ISBN 9780719046001. LCCN 2003046365.
