= FC Budăi =

- Full name: Fotbal Club Budăi
- Founded: 2013
- Dissolved: 2015
- Ground: Stadionul Telenești; Telenești, Moldova
- Capacity: 1,000
- Manager: Ghenadie Anghel (2013–2014)
- 2014–15: Divizia A, 4th of 12 (withdrew)
Home colours

FC Budăi was a Moldovan football club based in Budăi, Telenești, Republic of Moldova. They played in the Divizia A, the second tier of Moldovan football. Budăi, Telenești is a small village in the outskirts of Moldova, near Telenești.

== Achievements ==
- Divizia B

Winners (1): 2013–14
