= Ivan Mandricenco =

Moldovan footballer and coach

Personal information
- Date of birth: 18 June 1965 (age 61)
- Height: 1.74 m (5 ft 8 1/2 in)
- Positions: Midfielder; defender

Senior career*
Years	Team	Apps	(Gls)
1980	FC Kolos Slobozia		
1982–1985	FC Avtomobilist Tiraspol	81	(2)
1988–1991	FC Tiligul Tiraspol	132	(1)
1992	FC Gekris Novorossiysk	6	(0)
1992	FC Kuban Krasnodar	3	(0)
1992	FC Niva Slavyansk-na-Kubani	15	(6)
1993	FC Kuban Krasnodar	12	(1)
1993	FC Niva Slavyansk-na-Kubani	4	(0)
1993	FC Nord-Am Ltd.- Podillya Khmelnytskyi	13	(0)
1994–1996	FC Nistru Otaci	67	(1)
1996–1997	FC Dinamo Bender	14	(0)
1997–1998	CSA Victoria Cahul	13	(0)
1998–1999	CSA Victoria Chişinău		

Managerial career
- 2006–2008: CSCA-Steaua Chişinău
- * Club domestic league appearances and goals

Ivan Mandricenco (Russian: Иван Иванович Мандриченко; born 18 June 1965) is a Moldovan football coach and a former player.

== See also ==
- Nicolae Mandrîcenco
