= Ion Constantin Ciobanu =

Moldovan politician and writer

Ion Ciobanu
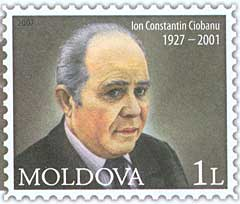
- 2007 stamp

Chairman of the Supreme Soviet of the Moldavian SSR
- In office 12 July 1986 – 17 April 1990
- Premier: Ivan Calin; Petru Pascari
- Preceded by: Mihail Lupașcu
- Succeeded by: Mircea Snegur

Personal details
- Born: 6 November 1927 Budăi, Kingdom of Romania
- Died: 19 January 2001 (aged 73) Gherla, Romania

Ion Constantin Ciobanu (Russian: Ион Константинович Чебан, romanized: Ion Konstantinovich Cheban; 6 November 1927 – 19 January 2001) was a writer and politician from Moldova. He served as the head of the Moldovan Writers' Union (1961–1965).

== Biography ==
Ion Ciobanu was born on 6 November 1927 in Budăi village (nowadays Teleneşti district), in a peasant family. He graduated from the Orhei Pedagogical High School, and then, in 1959 the higher literary courses of the Writers’ Union of the USSR. Next, in 1947 he became a member of the Communist Party of the Soviet Union (CPSU), and in 1951, he graduated from the Central Komsomol High School in Moscow.

He worked in a school, at a publishing house, and then, headed Writers’ Union of MSSR: Chairman (1961-1965) and Secretary of the Management Committee (1971-1989). He has also been chairperson of the Republican Committee for the State Awards in the field of literature and art (since 1973), subsequently obtaining the title of the Peoples’ Writer of the MSSR (1984).

Ion C. Ciobanu has debuted with the novel Codrii (part I - 1954, part II - 1957, and in 1958 with the Russian translation) - which presents the historical chain of events of his native land: the hard life of the Moldovan people in the past, the fight for the freedom and re-union with the Soviet state.

Another well-known novel is Bridges (Podurile) published in 1966, and Russian translation appeared in 1968. The novel describes the events that took place in the life of the Moldavian village in the first months after the Second World War. This novel is of strong and severe realism, forming together with the novels Cucoara (1975) and Podgorenii (1982) a trilogy about the life of the village hidden in the forest (Codru) over the last five decades.

Ion C. Ciobanu became also known as a novelist, publishing sketches and short stories in the collection “The Meeting with the Hero” (Întâlnire cu eroul) (1962), in which he proved his skills to surprise in a few concrete briefly exposed episodes, by the psychology, mentality and people actings. He also published three publicistic volumes: Evocations (Evocări) (1964), The Strongness of the Word Mastery (Tăria slovei măiestrite) (1971), Artistic Modeling (Modelări Artistice) (1986). In these articles, sketches, medallions he tackled diverse problems of village and town life or economic and social issues (Everyday bread (Pâinea cea de toate zilele), Let's talk about roads (Să vorbim despre drumuri), etc.).

He was decorated with the Order of the Red Flag of Labor, the Peoples Friendship Order and the other several medals. For the novel "Bridges”, he was awarded in 1970 the State Prize of the Moldavian SSR. Based on this novel, in 1973 a movie was made, where played such actors as Mihai Volontir and Mikhail Boyarsky.

From 12 July 1986 to 17 April 1990, Ion C. Ciobanu (Ivan Ceban) was a chairperson of the Supreme Soviet of Moldavian SSR (in legislature 11), and in the period 12–29 July 1989, the Chairman of the Supreme Soviet of the Moldavian SSR. He was also and MP in the Soviet Supreme Soviet of the 6th, 8th and 9th legislatures.

== Works ==
- Codrii (partea I - 1954, partea a II-a - 1957) - roman
- Întâlnire cu eroul (1962) - culegere de schițe și nuvele
- Evocări (1964) - publicistică
- Podurile (1966; ed. a IV-a, Ed. Lumina, Chișinău, 1989) - roman
- Tăria slovei măiestrite (Chișinău, 1971) - publicistică
- Cucoara (Ed. Literatura artistică, 1975) - roman
- Voci pe oglinda apei (1981; ed. a II-a, Ed. Literatura artistică, Chișinău, 1986) - culegere de schițe și nuvele
- Podgorenii (М.: Scriitori sovietici, 1982) - roman
- Modelări artistice (1986) - publicistică

== Awards ==
- Ordinul Drapelul Roșu de Muncă,
- Ordinul Prietenia popoarelor
- Premiul de Stat al RSS Moldovenești.

== Bibliography ==
- Очерк истории молдавской советской литературы ("Descrierea istoriei literaturii sovietice moldovenești") (1963)
- Iu. Kozhevnikov - Кожевников Ю. Дорогой народной жизни // Дружба народов(1968. — No. 6)
- Vasile Coroban - Романул молдовенеск контемпоран ("Romanul moldovenesc contemporan") (Chișinău, Ed. Cartea Moldovenească, 1969; ed. a II-a, 1974)
- Ion Ciocanu - Подуриле веций ши але креацией ("Podurile vieții și ale creației") (Chișinău, Ed. Literatura artistică, 1978)
- Vladimir Beșleagă - Podurile : o carte paradoxală, capitol în cartea "Suflul vremii" (Chișinău, Ed. Literatura artistică, 1981)
- Haralambie Corbu - О панорамэ а сатулуй молдовенеск контемпоран ("O panoramă a satului moldovenmesc contemporan") (Nistru, 1981, No. 11)
- Nicolae Bilețchi - Романул ши контемпоранеитатя ("Romanul și contemporaneitatea") (Chișinău, Ed. Știința, 1984)
- Anatol Gavrilov - Рефлекций асупра романулуй ("Reflecții asupra romanului") (Chișinău, Ed. Literatura artistică, 1984)
- Literatura și arta Moldovei: Enciclopedie (Chișinău, 1985-1986)
