= Supreme Soviet of the Moldavian Soviet Socialist Republic =

Moldovan government body

Supreme Soviet of the Moldavian SSR Sovietul Suprem al RSS Moldovenească (Romanian) Советул Супрем ал РСС Молдовенешть (Moldovan Cyrillic) Верховный Совет Молдавской ССР (Russian)
- Moldavian SSR (1941–1991); Moldova (1991–1993)
- Emblem of the Moldavian Soviet Socialist Republic

Type
- Type: Supreme Soviet

History
- Established: 1941
- Disbanded: 1993
- Succeeded by: Parliament of the Republic of Moldova

Elections
- Last election: 1990

The Supreme Soviet of the Moldavian SSR (Romanian: Sovietul Suprem al RSS Moldovenești, Moldovan Cyrillic: Советул Супрем ал РСС Молдовенешть; Russian: Верховный Совет Молдавской ССР, romanized: Verkhovnyy Sovet Moldavskoy SSR) was the highest organ of state authority of the Moldavian SSR and later the independent Republic of Moldova from 1941 to 1993. The last elections of the Supreme Soviet of the Moldavian SSR were held in 1990, and 371 deputies were elected.

== Convocations ==
On May 23, 1991, the 12th convocation of the Supreme Soviet of the Moldavian SSR became the first Parliament of the Republic of Moldova.

- 1st Convocation (1941-1946)
- 2nd Convocation (1947-1950)
- 3rd Convocation (1951-1954)
- 4th Convocation (1955-1959)
- 5th Convocation (1959-1962)
- 6th Convocation (1963-1966)
- 7th Convocation (1967-1970)
- 8th Convocation (1971-1974)
- 9th Convocation (1975-1979)
- 10th Convocation (1980-1984)
- 11th Convocation (1985-1989)
- 12th Convocation (1990-1993)

== Chairmen of the Supreme Soviet ==
Portrait	Chairman	From	To
	Nikita Salogor	8 February 1941	13 May 1947
	Macarie Radul	13 May 1947	26 March 1951
	Semion Cojuhari	26 March 1951	17 April 1959
	Iosif Vartician	17 April 1959	3 April 1963
	Andrei Lupan	3 April 1963	11 April 1967
	Sergiu Rădăuțanu	11 April 1967	14 July 1971
	Artiom Lazarev	14 July 1971	10 April 1980
	Pavel Boțu	10 April 1980	29 March 1985
	Mihail Lupașcu	29 March 1985	12 July 1986
	Ion Constantin Ciobanu	12 July 1986	17 April 1990
	Mircea Snegur	27 April 1990	3 September 1990
	Alexandru Moșanu	3 September 1990	3 February 1993

== Chairmen of the Presidium of the Supreme Soviet ==
Portrait	Chairman	From	To
	Fyodor Brovko (1904–1960)	10 February 1941	26 March 1951
	Ion Codiță (1899–1980)	28 March 1951	3 April 1963
	Kirill Ilyashenko (1915–1980)	3 April 1963	10 April 1980
	Ivan Calin (1935–2012)	19 April 1980	24 December 1985
	Alexandru Mocanu (1934–2018)	24 December 1985	29 July 1989
	Mircea Snegur (1940–2023)	29 July 1989	17 April 1990

== See also ==
- Supreme Soviet
- Parliament of Moldova
- Supreme Council (Transnistria)
