= 2014–15 Moldovan "A" Division =

Moldovan "A" Division
- Season: 2014–15
- Champions: Sheriff-2 Tiraspol
- Promoted: Petrocub Hîncești; Speranța Nisporeni
- Top goalscorer: Vladimir Ambros (25 goals)

The 2014–15 Moldovan "A" Division season is the 24th since its establishment. A total of 12 teams are contesting the league.

== Teams ==
Club	Location
Dacia-2 Buiucani	Chişinău
FC Victoria	Bardar
Sheriff-2	Tiraspol
Sfîntul Gheorghe	Suruceni
Zimbru-2	Chişinău
Intersport-Aroma	Cobusca Nouă
Edineţ	Edineţ
Real Succes	Chişinău
Gagauziya	Comrat
CSF Speranța	Nisporeni
Budăi	Budăi, Teleneşti
CS Petrocub	Sărata-Galbenă

== League table ==
Pos	Team	Pld	W	D	L	GF	GA	GD	Pts	Promotion or relegation
1	Sheriff-2 Tiraspol (C)	22	15	4	3	53	14	+39	49	Ineligible for promotion
2	Petrocub Hîncești (P)	22	13	6	3	55	21	+34	45	Promotion to Divizia Națională
3	Speranța Nisporeni (P)	22	14	2	6	33	16	+17	44	Promotion to Divizia Națională
4	Budăi	22	10	5	7	31	23	+8	35	withdrew (Note: Budăi completed the season but withdrew from the league prior to the start of the next season.)
5	Zimbru-2 Chișinău	22	9	7	6	36	29	+7	34	Ineligible for promotion
6	Sfîntul Gheorghe	22	10	3	9	41	34	+7	33	
7	Victoria Bardar	22	9	4	9	34	27	+7	31	
8	Edineţ	22	8	3	11	30	35	−5	27	
9	Intersport-Aroma	22	6	5	11	13	37	−24	23	
10	Dacia-2 Buiucani	22	4	6	12	18	32	−14	18	Ineligible for promotion
11	Real Succes	22	3	6	13	19	46	−27	15	
12	Gagauziya Comrat	22	3	5	14	19	68	−49	14	

Source: Football Association of Moldova
Rules for classification: 1st points; 2nd head-to-head points; 3rd head-to-head goal difference; 4th head-to-head goals scored; 5th goal difference; 6th number of goals scored; 7th Fair Play competition
(C) Champions; (P) Promoted

=== Round by round ===
Team ╲ Round	1	2	3	4	5	6	7	8	9	10	11	12	13	14	15	16	17	18	19	20	21	22
Sheriff-2 Tiraspol	6	2	6	6	5	3	2	2	1	1	1	1	1	1	1	1	1	2	1	1	1	1
Petrocub Hîncești	7	8	4	4	4	4	6	4	6	5	6	4	4	3	3	3	3	3	2	2	2	2
Speranța Nisporeni	3	7	9	5	6	6	7	5	4	3	2	2	2	2	2	2	2	1	3	3	3	3
Budăi	12	5	10	8	8	8	4	7	8	8	8	6	6	7	7	7	7	8	8	6	5	4
Zimbru-2 Chișinău	11	12	8	7	9	7	8	6	7	6	7	8	8	8	8	8	8	6	5	7	6	5
Sfîntul Gheorghe	2	4	2	1	1	2	3	3	3	4	4	7	7	6	6	6	6	5	4	5	4	6
Victoria Bardar	4	3	3	2	3	5	5	8	5	7	5	5	5	5	5	5	5	7	6	4	7	7
Edineț	1	1	1	3	2	1	1	1	2	2	3	3	3	4	4	4	4	4	7	8	8	8
Intersport-Aroma	8	11	11	11	11	11	11	10	9	9	9	9	9	9	9	9	9	9	9	9	9	9
Dacia-2 Buiucani	10	6	7	9	7	9	9	9	11	11	12	10	10	10	10	10	10	10	10	10	10	10
Real Succes	9	10	12	12	12	12	12	12	12	12	10	11	11	11	11	11	11	11	11	12	11	11
Gagauziya Comrat	5	9	5	10	10	10	10	11	10	10	11	12	12	12	12	12	12	12	12	11	12	12

Source: Football Association of Moldova

== Results ==
Home \ Away	DAC	GAG	BUD	SPE	PET	INT	REA	EDI	VIC	SHE	SFÎ	ZIM
Dacia-2 Buiucani		0–1	2–2	0–1	1–1	1–3	1–1	1–2	4–1	0–3	1–2	0–0
Gagauziya Comrat	2–1		0–5	0–2	0–5	0–0	1–5	1–6	2–2	3–2	1–4	0–3
FC Budăi	0–1	5–2		0–1	0–3	3–0	3–0	1–0	1–0	0–0	0–1	2–1
CSF Speranța	1–3	3–0	1–2		0–1	4–0	2–0	1–0	2–1	1–0	3–0	0–0
CS Petrocub	2–0	5–0	0–1	3–1		5–1	3–0	3–0	0–0	1–1	1–1	4–4
Intersport-Aroma	1–0	0–0	0–0	0–0	1–0		0–1	2–1	0–1	1–0	1–0	0–0
Real Succes Chișinău	0–0	2–2	2–2	0–2	0–5	2–0		2–3	0–2	0–0	0–5	0–1
Edineț	1–0	0–0	2–0	0–4	2–3	4–0	1–1		0–2	0–1	1–0	4–0
Victoria Bardar	5–0	2–0	0–0	1–0	1–3	3–1	4–0	3–0		0–1	2–2	1–3
Sheriff-2 Tiraspol	2–0	10–1	4–2	3–0	2–0	6–1	3–1	5–0	3–2		4–0	1–1
Sfîntul Gheorghe	0–1	3–2	1–2	2–3	3–3	3–0	3–1	3–1	3–1	0–1		2–0
Zimbru-2 Chișinău	1–1	3–1	2–0	0–1	2–4	3–1	3–1	2–2	2–0	0–1	5–3	

Updated to match(es) played on 4 June 2015. Source: Football Association of Moldova
Legend: Blue = home team win; Yellow = draw; Red = away team win.

== Top goalscorers ==
Updated to matches played on 4 June 2015.

Rank	Player	Club	Goals
1	(Moldova) Vladimir Ambros	CS Petrocub	25
2	(Moldova) Roman Șumchin	CS Petrocub	14
3	(Moldova) Dumitru Ionaş	FC Edineț	11
3	(Moldova) Alexandru Răilean	Sfîntul Gheorghe Suruceni	11
5	(Moldova) Maxim Şoimu	CSF Speranța	10
5	(Moldova) Andrei Cobeţ	FC Sheriff-2 Tiraspol	10
