= Vladimir Dragovozov =

Moldovan footballer

Personal information
- Full name: Vladimir Dragovozov
- Date of birth: 1 January 1984 (age 42)
- Place of birth: Chișinău, Moldavian SSR
- Height: 1.77 m (5 ft 9 1/2 in)
- Position: Midfielder

Team information
- Current team: Academia Chișinău
- Number: 20

Senior career*
Years	Team	Apps	(Gls)
2009–2010	FC Milsami Orhei	23	(2)
2010–2014	FC Dacia Chișinău	29	(2)
2014–2015	FC Dinamo-Auto Tiraspol	18	(0)
2015–	Academia Chișinău	0	(0)
- * Club domestic league appearances and goals as of 19 July 2015

Vladimir Dragovozov (born 1 January 1984, Chișinău, Moldavian SSR) is a Moldavian football midfielder who plays for Academia Chișinău.

He has been featured in Football Manager since 2014.

== Club statistics ==
- Total matches played in Moldavian First League: 70 matches - 4 goals
