= Alexandru Dulghier =

Moldovan footballer

Personal information
- Full name: Alexandru Dulghier
- Date of birth: 3 January 1995 (age 31)
- Place of birth: Basarabeasca, Moldova
- Position: Forward

Team information
- Current team: FC Milsami Orhei
- Number: 9

Senior career*
| Years | Team | Apps | (Gls) |
| 2010–2011 | Locomotiva Basarabeasca | 14 | (0) |
| 2013– | FC Milsami Orhei | 34 | (4) |
- * Club domestic league appearances and goals as of 25 September 2015

Alexandru Dulghier is a Moldovan footballer who plays as forward for FC Milsami Orhei.
