= FC Torentul Chișinău =

Torentul Chişinău
- Full name: Fotbal Club Torentul Chişinău
- Founded: 1992
- Dissolved: 1996
- Ground: Stadionul Dinamo; Chişinău, Moldova
- Capacity: 1,000
- 1995–1996: Moldovan National Division, 13th

FC Torentul Chişinău was a Moldovan football club based in Chişinău, Moldova. They played in the Moldovan National Division, the top division in Moldovan football.

== History ==
The club was established in 1992 as Dinamo-Codru Chișinău based on the Soviet club Moldovgidromaș Chișinău (1980–1991).

- 1992 – renaming in Dinamo Chişinău
- 1993 – renaming in Torentul Chişinău
- 1996 – dissolution

== List of seasons ==
Season	League									Cup	Ref
Season	Division	Pos	Pld	W	D	L	GF	GA	Pts	Cup	Ref
1992	Divizia Națională	7th	22	8	5	9	30	23	21	Round of 16	
1992–93	Divizia Națională	13th	30	6	8	16	31	49	20	Runners-up	
1993–94	Divizia Națională	7th	30	10	9	11	34	30	29	Round of 16	
1994–95	Divizia Națională	10th	26	6	5	15	24	46	23	Round of 16	
1995–96	Divizia Națională	↓ 13th	30	5	5	20	36	94	20	Round of 16	
