= Borosenii Noi =

- Village
- Location within Moldova
- Coordinates: 47.986111°N 27.472222°E
- Country: Moldova

Government
  - Mayor: Eugeniu Rîbac (PDM)

Population (2014 census)
  - Total: 1,537
- Time zone: UTC+2 (EET)
  - Summer (DST): UTC+3 (EEST)
- Postal code: MD-5613

Borosenii Noi is a village in Rîșcani District, Moldova.
