= Nicolai Mandrîcenco =

Moldavian-Ukrainian footballer and manager

Personal information
- Full name: Nicolai Mandrîcenco
- Date of birth: 12 March 1958 (age 68)
- Place of birth: Plakhtiivka, Bilhorod-Dnistrovskyi Raion, Ukrainian SSR
- Height: 1.82 m (6 ft 0 in)

Youth career
- Years: Team
- Sarata sports school

Managerial career
- 2004: FC Krasyliv (Note: In 2004 FC Krasyliv merged with FC Podillya Khmelnytskyi and adopted the name of the last, while the original Podillya was removed from national competitions.)
- 2014–2016: FC Dinamo-Auto Tiraspol
- ‡ National team caps and goals as of 6 February 2015

Nicolai Mandrîcenco (Ukrainian: Микола Іванович Мандриченко, Mykola Mandrychenko; born 12 March 1958) is a Moldovan professional football manager and former footballer. He has Ukrainian citizenship.

== Career ==
Since August 2014 he is the head coach of Moldavian football club FC Dinamo-Auto Tiraspol.

He has two sons Constantin Mandrîcenco and Dmitri Mandrîcenco both born in Moldova and who are also footballers.

== See also ==
- Ivan Mandricenco
