= Speranța Nisporeni =

Association football club in Moldova

- Full name: CSF Speranța Nisporeni
- Founded: 1991
- Dissolved: 2021
- Ground: Stadionul Mircea Eliade; Nisporeni, Moldova
- Capacity: 2,500
- 2020–21: Divizia Națională, 9th of 10 (relegated)

Speranța Nisporeni was a Moldovan football club based in Nisporeni, Moldova.

The club was founded in 1991 and played 6 seasons in the Moldovan National Division between 1992 and 1998, before being relegated to the Moldovan "A" Division. They were promoted back into the Moldovan National Division in the 2015–16 season.

== Achievements ==
- Divizia B
  - Winners (1): 2013–14

== European record ==
As of 18 July 2019

Season	Competition	Round	Club	Home	Away	Agg.
2019–20	UEFA Europa League	1QR	(Azerbaijan) Neftçi	0–3	0–6	0–9

Notes

- 1QR: First qualifying round

== List of seasons ==
Season	League									Cup	Ref
Season	Division	Pos	Pld	W	D	L	GF	GA	Pts	Cup	Ref
1992	Divizia Națională	8th	22	6	5	11	20	32	17	Round of 16	
1992–93	Divizia Națională	9th	30	9	10	11	28	34	28	Round of 16	
1993–94	Divizia Națională	↓ 16th	30	5	4	21	27	63	14	Round of 32	
1994–95	Divizia A	↑ 2nd	36	26	5	5	84	25	83	Round of 16	
1995–96	Divizia Națională	11th	30	8	7	15	41	51	31	Round of 16	
1996–97	Divizia Națională	6th	30	11	9	10	34	36	42	Quarter-finals	
1997–98	Divizia Națională	↓ 14th	26	0	5	21	9	46	3 (Note: Speranța were deducted 2 points in the 1997–98 season)	Round of 16	
1998–99	Divizia A	↓ 15th	30	1	4	25	13	99	7	—	
1999–2013	The club did not exist										
2013–14	Divizia B (Centre)	↑ 1st	16	12	0	4	43	16	36	1st preliminary round	
2014–15	Divizia A	↑ 3rd	22	14	2	6	33	16	44	Round of 16	
2015–16	Divizia Națională	7th	27	8	7	12	24	36	31	Round of 16	
2016–17	Divizia Națională	7th	30	7	8	15	24	35	29	Round of 16	
2017	Divizia Națională	6th	18	5	6	7	18	21	21	Quarter-finals	
2018	Divizia Națională	4th	28	9	11	8	27	26	38	Quarter-finals	
2019	Divizia Națională	6th	28	8	11	9	29	34	35	Semi-finals	
2020–21	Divizia Națională	↓ 9th	36	5	8	23	29	87	23	Quarter-finals	
