= Ciuciuleni =

- Commune and village
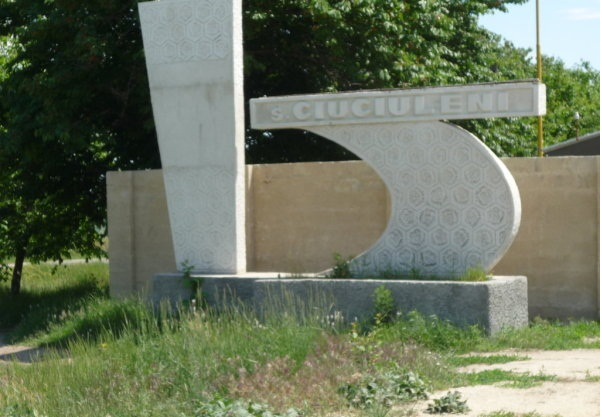
- Logo of Ciuciuleni

- Location in Moldova
- Coordinates: 47°01′N 28°24′E
- Country: Moldova
- District: Hîncești District

Government
  - Mayor: Gheorghe Grigoras (Independent/ Neutral)

Area
  - Total: 2.06 sq mi (5.34 km^{2})

Population (2014 census)
  - Total: 4,368
  - Density: 2,120/sq mi (818/km^{2})
- Time zone: UTC+2 (EET)
  - Summer (DST): UTC+3 (EEST)

Ciuciuleni is a village in Hîncești District, Moldova.

== Notable people ==
- Grigore Scafaru
- Valentina Sturza
