= Octavian Onofrei =

Moldovan footballer

Personal information
- Full name: Octavian Onofrei
- Date of birth: 16 May 1991 (age 35)
- Place of birth: Orhei, Moldova
- Height: 1.83 m (6 ft 0 in)
- Position: Forward

Team information
- Current team: Spartanii Selemet
- Number: 9

Senior career*
Years	Team	Apps	(Gls)
2009–2011	FC Iskra-Stal	34	(4)
2011–2013	FC Costuleni	48	(6)
2013–2014	FC Speranța Crihana Veche	26	(4)
2014	FC Costuleni	12	(4)
2014–2015	FC Zaria Bălți	9	(0)
2015–2016	Dacia Chișinău	11	(3)
2016–2018	Dinamo-Auto Tiraspol	42	(9)
2019–	Spartanii Selemet	3	(4)

International career
2009	Moldova U19	3	(1)
- * Club domestic league appearances and goals as of 30 March 2018

Octavian Onofrei (born 16 May 1991) is a Moldovan football forward who plays for Spartanii Selemet.
