= Speia =

Scientific classification
- Domain: Eukaryota
- Kingdom: Animalia
- Phylum: Arthropoda
- Class: Insecta
- Order: Lepidoptera
- Superfamily: Noctuoidea
- Family: Noctuidae
- Genus: Speia; Tams & Bowden, 1953

Genus of moths

Speia is a genus of moths of the family Noctuidae.

== Species ==
- Speia vuteria (Stoll, [1790])
