= Dumitru Popescu (footballer, born 1994) =

Moldovan footballer

Personal information
- Full name: Dumitru Popescu
- Date of birth: 11 April 1994 (age 32)
- Place of birth: Chișinău, Republic of Moldova
- Height: 1.83 m (6 ft 0 in)
- Position: Forward

Team information
- Current team: Dinamo-Auto Tiraspol
- Number: 22

Senior career*
Years	Team	Apps	(Gls)
2014–2016	FC Dacia Chișinău	5	(0)
2015	→Dinamo-Auto Tiraspol	7	(0)
2015–2016	→Academia Chișinău	10	(0)
2017–	Dinamo-Auto Tiraspol	5	(0)
- * Club domestic league appearances and goals as of 16 October 2014

Dumitru Popescu (born 11 April 1994, Chișinău, Moldova) is a Moldavian football forward who plays for Dinamo-Auto Tiraspol.

== Club statistics ==
- Total matches played in Moldavian First League: 28 matches - 0 goals

Total matches in Moldavian Cup: ! matches- 1 goal
