= Association of Former Deportees and Political Detainees =

- Asociaţia foştilor deportaţi şi deţinuţi politici
- Headquarters: Chişinău
- Key people: Valentina Sturza

The Association of Former Deportees and Political Detainees (Romanian: Asociaţia foştilor deportaţi şi deţinuţi politici) is a non-governmental organisation in Moldova.

Valentina Sturza is the chair of the Association of Former Deportees and Political Detainees.
