= Budăi, Telenești =

Budăi
- Commune and village
- Location in Moldova
- Coordinates: 47°27′N 28°20′E
- Country: Moldova
- District: Telenești District

Population (2014 census)
  - Total: 1,728
- Time zone: UTC+2 (EET)
  - Summer (DST): UTC+3 (EEST)

Budăi is a village in Telenești District, Moldova.

== Notable people ==
- Ion Constantin Ciobanu
- Axentie Blanovschi
