= Cioburciu, Ștefan Vodă =

Cioburciu Ciubărciu (before 1812)
- Village
- Location within Moldova
- Coordinates: 46°36′N 29°41′E
- Country: Moldova

Government
  - Mayor: Dmitrii Wissotzky (PDM)

Area
  - Total: 54.96 km^{2} (21.22 sq mi)
- Elevation: 63 m (207 ft)

Population (2014 census)
  - Total: 2,573
- Time zone: UTC+2 (EET)
  - Summer (DST): UTC+3 (EEST)
- Postal code: MD-4216

Cioburciu is a village in Ștefan Vodă District, Moldova.
