= Vladimir Cosse =

Moldovan footballer

Personal information
- Full name: Vladimir Cosse
- Date of birth: 30 September 1967 (age 59)
- Place of birth: Chernogorsk, Soviet Union (now Russia)
- Height: 1.83 m (6 ft 0 in)
- Position: Forward

Senior career*
Years	Team	Apps	(Gls)
1984–1985	Salyut Belgorod	43	(1)
1986–1987	CSKA–2 Moscow	51	(12)
1987	FC CSKA Moscow	1	(0)
1988	Lokomotiv Moscow	0	(0)
1989	Avangard Kursk	8	(1)
1989–1990	Spartak Ordzhonikidze	44	(4)
1990	Asmaral Moscow	2	(0)
1991–1992	Shinnik Yaroslavl	43	(13)
1992–1999	Tiligul Tiraspol	193	(131)
1999	MFC Mykolaiv	11	(2)
1999–2000	Zirka Kirovohrad	13	(4)
2000–2001	Tavriya Simferopol	11	(0)
2001	Tobol Kostanay	11	(4)
2002	Zhetysu Taldykorgan	16	(8)
2003	Vietnam Airlines		
	Total	447	(180)

International career^{‡}
1992–1998	Moldova	9	(1)
- * Club domestic league appearances and goals as of 10 November 2013 ‡ National team caps and goals as of 10 November 2013

Vladimir Cosse (born 30 September 1967) is a former Moldovan international footballer, retired in 2003.

== International goals ==
International goals
№	Date	Location	Opponent	Goal	Result	Competition
1	16.04.1994	Jacksonville, United States	United States	1 – 1 85' (pen.)	1 – 1	Friendly match
