= FC Universul Ciuciuleni =

Universul Ciuciuleni
- Full name: Fotbal Club Universul Ciuciuleni
- Founded: 1992
- Dissolved: 1994
- Ground: Stadionul Satesc; Ciuciuleni, Moldova
- Capacity: 500
- 1992–93: Moldovan National Division, 16th

Universul Ciuciuleni was a Moldovan football club based in Ciuciuleni, Moldova. It played in the Moldovan National Division, the top division in Moldovan football. In its lone season in the top flight, the club finished last and was relegated.
