= FC Bugeac Comrat =

Association football club in Moldova

Bugeac Comrat
- Full name: Football Club Bugeac Comrat
- Founded: 1991
- Dissolved: 1996
- 1995–96: Divizia Națională, 16th of 16 (relegated)

FC Bugeac Comrat was a Moldovan football club based in Comrat, Moldova. They played in the Moldovan National Division, the first tier of Moldovan football.

== History ==
The club was founded in 1991. It played one season in the fourth tier of the Soviet league system. In 1992, Bugeac won the first edition of the Moldovan Cup. The club played five seasons in the Moldovan National Division before it was dissolved in 1996.

== Honours ==
- Moldovan Cup
  - Winners (1): 1992

== List of seasons ==
Season	League									Cup	Ref
Season	Division	Pos	Pld	W	D	L	GF	GA	Pts	Cup	Ref
1992	Divizia Națională	3rd	22	13	7	2	51	11	33	Winners	
1992–93	Divizia Națională	4th	30	16	8	6	38	21	40	Quarter-finals	
1993–94	Divizia Națională	6th	30	14	5	11	42	36	33	Quarter-finals	
1994–95	Divizia Națională	7th	26	10	1	15	29	56	31	Quarter-finals	
1995–96	Divizia Națională	↓ 16th	30	0	1	29	6	139	1	Round of 32	
