= FC MHM-93 Chișinău =

MHM-93 Chișinău
- Full name: Fotbal Club MHM 93 Chișinău
- Founded: 1993
- Dissolved: 1997
- Ground: Stadionul Dinamo; Chișinău, Moldova
- Capacity: 2,692
- 1996–1997: Moldovan National Division, 13th
Home colours	Away colours

FC MHM-93 Chișinău was a Moldovan football club based in Chişinău, Moldova. Between 1994 and 1997 they have played in the Moldovan National Division, the top division in Moldovan football.

== Achievements ==
- Divizia A

Winners (1): 1993–94
