= FC Progresul Briceni =

Progresul Briceni
- Full name: Fotbal Club Progresul Briceni
- Founded: 1992
- Dissolved: 1996
- Ground: Stadionul Briceni; Briceni, Moldova
- Capacity: 1,250
- 1995–96: Moldovan National Division, 15th

FC Progresul Briceni was a Moldovan football club based in Briceni, Moldova. They played in the Moldovan National Division, the top division in Moldovan football.

== History ==
1992 – foundation as FC Vilia Briceni

1994 – renaming in FC Progresul Briceni

1996 – dissolution

== Achievements ==
- Divizia A

Winners (1): 1992–93
