= FC Nistru Cioburciu =

Nistru Cioburciu
- Full name: Fotbal Club Nistru Cioburciu
- Founded: 1992
- Dissolved: 1996
- Ground: Stadionul Tinerețea; Cioburciu, Moldova
- Capacity: 1.000
- 1995–1996: Moldovan National Division, 14th

FC Nistru Cioburciu was a Moldovan football club based in Cioburciu, Moldova. Club was founded in 1992 and played 4 seasons in Moldovan National Division, before dissolution in 1996.
