= FC Spumante Cricova =

Spumante Cricova
- Full name: Fotbal Club Spumante Cricova
- Founded: 1994
- Dissolved: 1997
- Ground: Stadionul Cricova; Cricova, Moldova
- Capacity: 500
- 1996–97: Moldovan National Division, 15th
Home colours	Away colours	Third colours

FC Spumante Cricova was a Moldovan football club based in Cricova, Moldova. Club was founded in 1994 and played 2 seasons in Moldovan National Division, before it was dissolved.
