= FC Tighina =

Tighina
- Full name: Football Club Tighina
- Founded: 18 April 1950
- Dissolved: 2021
- Ground: Bender City Stadium
- Capacity: 4,990
- 2020–21: Divizia A, 9th of 14
Home colours	Away colours

Fotbal Club Tighina was a Moldovan football club based in Bender (also known as Tighina), Moldova.

== History ==
Old logo

During its existence, the club has been known by the following names:

- 1950—1958: Burevestnik Bender
- In 1959: Lokomotiv Bender
- 1960—1969: Nistrul Bender
- 1970—1987: Pishchevik Bender / Kharchovyk Bendery
- In 1988: Tighina Bender
- In 1989: Tighina-RShVSM
- In 1990: Tighina Bender
- In 1991: Tighina-Apoel Bender
- 1992—1996: Tighina Bender
- 1996—1999: Dinamo Bender
- 1999—2000: Dinamo-Stimold Tighina
- 2000—2011: Dinamo Bender
- 2011—2014: Tighina
- 2014—2017: Dinamo Bender
- Since 2017: Tighina

== League and Cup history ==
=== Soviet Union ===
Season	Div.	Pos.	Pl.	W	D	L	GS	GA	P	Soviet Cup	Top Scorer (League)	Head Coach
1974	3rd	20	38	5	6	27	14	73	16			

=== Moldova ===
Season	Div.	Pos.	Pl.	W	D	L	GS	GA	P	Cup	Top Scorer (League)	Head Coach
1992	1st	4	22	9	8	5	21	17	26	Quarterfinals		(Moldova) Eugen Piunovschi
1992–93	1st	11	30	8	8	14	32	46	22	Round of 8		(Moldova) Eugen Piunovschi
1993–94	1st	11	30	9	8	13	43	55	26	Round of 8		(Moldova) Nicolae Mandricenco (2nd round)
1994–95	1st	4	36	18	2	6	43	18	56	Round of 8		(Moldova) Dumitru Chihaev
1995–96	1st	12	30	7	5	18	41	52	26	Quarterfinals	(Moldova) Igor Raicev – 18	(Moldova) Eugen Piunovschi, Vladimir Beläi
1996–97	1st	7	30	12	5	13	42	45	41	Round of 8	(Moldova) Mihail Pavlov – 12	(Moldova) Vladimir Beläi
1997–98	1st	12	26	6	4	16	19	47	22	?	(Moldova) Alexandru Covalciuc – 5	(Moldova) Alexandr Veriovchin, Victor Murahovschi, Vladimir Beläi
1998–99	2nd	16	30	1	3	26	12	40	6	?		
1999-2000	2nd	8	26	10	3	13	27	36	33	?		(Moldova) Victor Murahovschi
2000–01	3rd	1	16	12	4	0	43	9	40	?		
2001–02	2nd	12	30	9	5	16	30	46	32	Round of 8		
2002–03	2nd	8	26	9	7	10	27	22	34	?		
2003–04	2nd	5	30	15	7	8	50	24	52	Quarterfinals		
2004–05	2nd	1	30	24	3	3	68	16	75	Round of 8		
2005–06	1st	8	28	2	9	17	17	59	15	?	(Moldova) Oleg Ichim – 5	(Moldova) Iuri Hodîchin
2006–07	1st	10	36	3	13	20	24	72	22	Quarterfinals	(Moldova) Maxim Mihaliov, Serghei Namașco, Serghei Mihaliov – 3	(Moldova) Iuri Hodîchin
2007–08	1st	9	30	7	5	18	30	57	26	Round of 8	(Moldova) Maxim Mihaliov – 6	(Moldova) Iuri Hodîchin
2008–09	1st	5	30	11	9	10	42	45	42	Round of 8	(Moldova) Maxim Mihaliov – 12	(Moldova) Iuri Hodîchin
2009–10	1st	10	33	9	5	19	36	66	32	Quarterfinals	(Moldova) Alexandru Pașcenco – 5	(Moldova) Iuri Hodîchin
2010–11	1st	14	39	6	4	29	25	118	22	2nd Round	(Moldova) Sergiu Zacon – 6	(Moldova) Iuri Hodîchin
2011–12	2nd	12	30	10	5	15	43	53	35	Round of 8		(Moldova) Iuri Hodîchin
2012–13	2nd	13	28	6	2	20	35	90	20	1st round		(Moldova) Iuri Hodîchin
2013–14	3rd	10 (Note: Tighina were disqualified from the league.)	0	0	0	0	0	0	0	1st round		
2014–15	Tighina played in regional amateur leagues.											
2015–16	Tighina played in regional amateur leagues.											
2016–17	Tighina played in regional amateur leagues.											
2017	3rd	2	18	15	2	1	59	13	47	1st round		
2018	3rd	1	18	14	3	1	80	11	45	2nd round		
2019	2nd	4	28	19	3	6	84	31	60	Round of 16	(Moldova) Artiom Litviacov – 30	(Moldova) Nicolae Mandrîcenco
2020–21	2nd	9	26	9	3	14	42	61	30	2nd round		

== Achievements ==
- Divizia A

Winners (1): 2004–05

- Divizia B

Winners (2): 2000–01, 2018
