= ULIM Chișinău =

- Full name: Fotbal Club ULIM Chișinău
- Founded: 1992
- Dissolved: 2002
Home colours

ULIM Chișinău was a Moldovan football club based in Chișinău, Moldova. They played 5 seasons in Moldovan National Division.

== History ==
The team was founded in 1992, starting with the 1992–93 season the team played in National Division where suddenly took 6th place team is also winner of the bronze in season 1993–94. Last year in the top division was 1996–97 where he took 10th in financial trouble it self relegated in second division.

- 1992 – foundation as FC Codru Calarasi
- 1997 – renaming in ULIM-Codru Calarasi
- 1998 – renaming in ULIM-Tebas Chişinău
- 1999 – renaming in ULIM Chişinău
- 2002 – dissolution

== Achievements ==
- Moldovan National Division

Third Place (1): 1993–94
