= 2017 FC Sheriff Tiraspol season =

Sheriff Tiraspol
2017 season
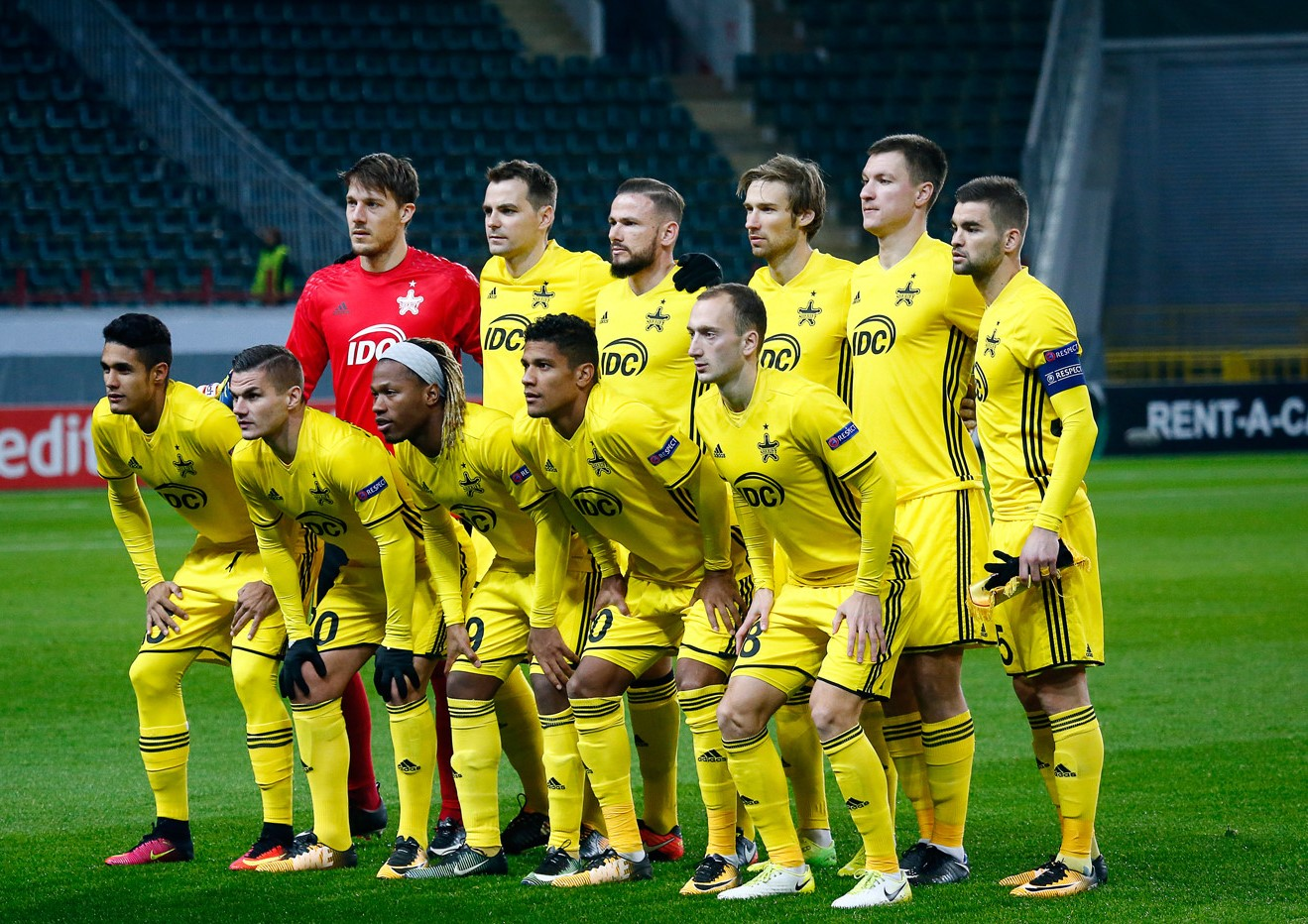
- Chairman: Viktor Gushan
- Manager: Roberto Bordin
- Stadium: Sheriff Stadium
- Divizia Naţională: 1st
- Moldovan Cup: Progress to 2018 season
- Champions League: Third qualifying round
- Europa League: Group stage
- Top goalscorer: League: Vitalie Damașcan (13); All: Vitalie Damașcan (13)
Home colours	Away colours

The 2017 season was FC Sheriff Tiraspol's 21st season, and their 20th in the Divizia Naţională, the top-flight of Moldovan football.

== Squad ==
As of match played 7 December 2017

No.	Name	Nationality	Position	Date of birth (age)	Signed from	Signed in	Contract ends	Apps.	Goals
Goalkeepers
1	Zvonimir Mikulić	(Croatia)	GK	5 February 1990 (aged 27)	loan from NK Osijek	2017		25	0
12	Maxim Bardîș	(Moldova)	GK	16 July 1997 (aged 20)	Trainee	2017		0	0
25	Sergiu Juric	(Moldova)	GK	3 March 1984 (aged 33)	Veris Chișinău	2014			
Defenders
3	Ion Jardan	(Moldova)	DF	10 January 1990 (aged 27)	Zimbru Chișinău	2017		21	0
4	Petru Racu	(Moldova)	DF	17 July 1987 (aged 30)	Milsami Orhei	2017		24	3
6	Victor Oliveira	(Brazil)	DF	28 May 1994 (aged 23)	Joinville	2016		17	0
15	Cristiano	(Brazil)	DF	29 August 1993 (aged 24)	loan from Volta Redonda	2017		29	1
26	Ivan Voropai	(Moldova)	DF	21 April 1998 (aged 19)	Trainee	2017		0	0
35	Ante Kulušić	(Croatia)	DF	6 June 1986 (aged 31)	HNK Rijeka	2017		17	2
37	Vitalie Bordian	(Moldova)	DF	11 August 1984 (aged 33)	Dacia Chișinău	2016		32	0
55	Mateo Sušić	(Bosnia and Herzegovina)	DF	18 November 1990 (aged 27)	Sheriff Tiraspol	2017		98	2
90	Veaceslav Posmac	(Moldova)	DF	7 November 1990 (aged 27)	Dacia Chișinău	2017		30	2
Midfielders
8	Jeremy de Nooijer	(Curaçao)	MF	15 March 1992 (aged 25)	Levski Sofia	2017		24	0
11	Zlatko Tripić	(Norway)	MF	2 December 1992 (aged 25)	SpVgg Greuther Fürth	2017		8	0
14	Wilfried Balima	(Burkina Faso)	MF	20 March 1985 (aged 32)	US Ouagadougou	2005			
17	Vsevolod Nihaev	(Moldova)	MF	4 May 1999 (aged 18)	Trainee	2017		0	0
18	Gheorghe Anton	(Moldova)	MF	27 January 1993 (aged 24)	Trainee	2017		26	0
19	Artiom Bilinschii	(Moldova)	MF	19 November 1996 (aged 21)	Trainee	2017		1	0
24	Jessie Guera Djou	(Cameroon)	MF	3 May 1997 (aged 20)	loan from Accra Lions	2017		3	0
30	Josip Brezovec	(Croatia)	MF	12 March 1986 (aged 31)	HNK Rijeka	2016		55	20
32	Evgheni Oancea	(Moldova)	MF	5 January 1996 (aged 21)	Trainee	2016		14	2
33	Mihail Caimacov	(Moldova)	MF	22 July 1998 (aged 19)	Trainee	2016		3	0
77	Yury Kendysh	(Belarus)	MF	10 June 1990 (aged 27)	loan from BATE Borisov	2017		14	2
Forwards
9	Stefan Mugoša	(Montenegro)	FW	26 February 1992 (aged 25)	1860 Munich	2017		21	7
10	Jairo	(Brazil)	FW	6 May 1992 (aged 25)	loan from PAOK	2017		21	6
22	Marin Căruntu	(Moldova)	FW	28 November 1997 (aged 20)	Trainee	2017		1	0
27	Andrei Cobeț	(Moldova)	FW	3 January 1997 (aged 20)	Trainee	2015		0	0
39	Ziguy Badibanga	(Belgium)	FW	26 November 1991 (aged 26)	Omonia Nicosia	2017		36	9
99	Vitalie Damașcan	(Moldova)	FW	24 January 1999 (aged 18)	Zimbru Chișinău	2017		35	19
Players away on loan
7	Jô Santos	(Brazil)	FW	31 March 1991 (aged 26)	Zimbru Chișinău	2016		16	4
16	Vadim Paireli	(Moldova)	MF	8 November 1995 (aged 22)	Trainee	2013		66	6
27	Andrei Macrițchii	(Moldova)	DF	13 February 1996 (aged 21)	Trainee	2013		4	1
29	Eugeniu Rebenja	(Moldova)	FW	5 March 1995 (aged 22)	Tiraspol	2015		38	11
Left during the season
20	Cyrille Bayala	(Burkina Faso)	MF	24 May 1996 (aged 21)	El Dakhleya	2016		39	11

=== Out on loan ===
Note: Flags indicate national team as defined under FIFA eligibility rules; some limited exceptions apply. Players may hold more than one non-FIFA nationality.

No.	Pos.	Nation	Player
7	MF	BRA	Jô Santos (at Politehnica Iași)
16	MF	MDA	Vadim Paireli (at Petrocub Hîncești)

No.	Pos.	Nation	Player
27	DF	MDA	Andrei Macrițchii (at Petrocub Hîncești)
29	FW	MDA	Eugeniu Rebenja (at Speranța Nisporeni)

== Transfers ==
=== In ===
Date	Position	Nationality	Name	From	Fee	Ref.
20 June 2017	DF	(Moldova)	Petru Racu	Milsami Orhei	Undisclosed	
21 June 2017	MF	(Curaçao)	Jeremy de Nooijer	Levski Sofia	Undisclosed	
21 June 2017	MF	(Moldova)	Gheorghe Anton	Zimbru Chișinău	Undisclosed	
28 June 2017	FW	(Montenegro)	Stefan Mugoša	1860 Munich	Undisclosed	
4 July 2017	DF	(Moldova)	Veaceslav Posmac	Dacia Chișinău	Undisclosed	
20 July 2017	MF	(Burkina Faso)	Wilfried Balima		Free	
31 July 2017	DF	(Croatia)	Ante Kulušić	HNK Rijeka	Undisclosed	
3 August 2017	MF	(Norway)	Zlatko Tripić	SpVgg Greuther Fürth	Undisclosed	

=== Out ===
Date	Position	Nationality	Name	To	Fee	Ref.
1 September 2017	MF	(Burkina Faso)	Cyrille Bayala	RC Lens	Undisclosed	

=== Loans in ===
Date from	Position	Nationality	Name	From	Date to	Ref.
22 June 2017	DF	(Brazil)	Cristiano	Volta Redonda	End of Season	
28 June 2017	GK	(Croatia)	Zvonimir Mikulić	Osijek	End of Season	
8 August 2017	FW	(Brazil)	Jairo	PAOK	End of Season	
30 August 2017	MF	(Belarus)	Yury Kendysh	BATE Borisov	End of Season	
24 October 2017	MF	(Cameroon)	Jessie Guera Djou	Accra Lions	End of 2018 Season	

=== Loans out ===
Date from	Position	Nationality	Name	To	Date to	Ref.
2 August 2017	FW	(Brazil)	Jô Santos	CSM Politehnica Iași	End of Season	
	DF	(Moldova)	Artur Crăciun	Milsami Orhei	End of Season	
	DF	(Moldova)	Andrei Macrițchii	Petrocub Hîncești	End of Season	
	MF	(Moldova)	Vadim Paireli	Petrocub Hîncești	End of Season	
	FW	(Moldova)	Eugeniu Rebenja	Speranța Nisporeni	End of Season	

=== Released ===
Date	Position	Nationality	Name	Joined	Date
16 June 2017	MF	(Burkina Faso)	Wilfried Balima	Sheriff Tiraspol	20 July 2017
16 June 2017	MF	(Brazil)	Ricardinho	Red Star Belgrade	16 June 2017
5 November 2017	DF	(Slovakia)	Dionatan Teixeira	His Death	
	GK	(Moldova)	Alexei Koșelev	Politehnica Iași	
	DF	(Bosnia and Herzegovina)	Vujadin Savić	Red Star Belgrade	
	DF	(Moldova)	Maxim Potîrniche	Petrocub Hîncești	
	DF	(Moldova)	Artiom Rozgoniuc	Petrocub Hîncești	
	MF	(Ghana)	Seidu Yahaya	Dinamo Minsk	
	MF	(Moldova)	Radu Gînsari	Hapoel Haifa	
	MF	(Moldova)	Ivan Urvanțev	Petrocub Hîncești	
	MF	(Sierra Leone)	Khalifa Jabbie	Racing Beirut	
	FW	(Moldova)	Maxim Iurcu	Speranța Nisporeni	

== Competitions ==
=== Divizia Națională ===
==== Results summary ====
Overall								Home						Away					
Pld	W	D	L	GF	GA	GD	Pts	W	D	L	GF	GA	GD	W	D	L	GF	GA	GD
18	14	3	1	50	14	+36	45	6	2	1	28	10	+18	8	1	0	22	4	+18

Last updated: 26 November 2017.
Source: See Results

==== Results ====
9 July 2017 1	Sheriff Tiraspol	5–0	Zaria Bălți	Tiraspol
20:00 EEST (UTC+3)	Brezovec (yellow card) 21' (goal) 58' (pen.); Mugoša 43'; Racu 45'; Damașcan 51'; Posmac 72'; Bordian (yellow card) 89'	Report	Novicov (yellow card) 13'; Mihaliov (yellow card) 71'	Stadium: Sheriff Stadium; Attendance: 2,000; Referee: Alexandr Tean

16 July 2017 2	Dacia Chișinău	1–1	Sheriff Tiraspol	Speia
18:30 EEST (UTC+3)	Anton 11'; Punoševac (yellow card) 57'; Pașcenco (yellow card) 84'; Ilescu (yellow card) 90+1'	Report	Brezovec 44'; Damașcan (yellow card) 90+1'	Stadium: Stadionul Moldova; Attendance: 800; Referee: Vladislav Ivancenco

22 July 2017 3	Sheriff Tiraspol	2–2	Zimbru Chișinău	Tiraspol
20:00 EEST (UTC+3)	Damașcan 13'; Bayala 37'; Jardan (yellow card) 55'	Report	Monday 27'; Theodoro 90'	Stadium: Sheriff Stadium; Attendance: 2,000; Referee: Gabriel Tupicico

29 July 2017 4	Petrocub Hîncești	1–2	Sheriff Tiraspol	Hîncești
18:00 EEST (UTC+3)	Taras (yellow card) 28'; Dima 76'	Report	Mugoša 70'; Victor (yellow card) 80'; Damașcan 82' (yellow card) 90+4'	Stadium: Stadionul Orășenesc; Attendance: 900; Referee: Alexandr Tean

5 August 2017 5	Sheriff Tiraspol	3–1	Dinamo-Auto Tiraspol	Tiraspol
20:00 EEST (UTC+3)	Damașcan 11', 35', 55'; Mugoša (yellow card) 48'	Report	Gheorghiev (yellow card) 31'; Costin (yellow card) 64'; Popovici (yellow card) 66' (goal) 90+1'; Roșca (yellow card) 71'	Stadium: Sheriff Stadium; Attendance: 1,000; Referee: Petru Stoianov

12 August 2017 6	Sfântul Gheorghe	0–3	Sheriff Tiraspol	Suruceni
18:00 EEST (UTC+3)	Pătraș (yellow card) 39'	Report	Damașcan 40'; Racu 47'; Posmac 65'; Anton (yellow card) 67'	Stadium: Suruceni Stadium; Attendance: 350; Referee: Iurie Rochin

20 August 2017 7	Sheriff Tiraspol	5–0	Spicul Chișcăreni	Tiraspol
20:00 EEST (UTC+3)	Posmac (yellow card) 20'; Mugoša 35', 41', 65' (yellow card) 51'; Victor (yellow card) 48'; Damașcan 53', 56' (yellow card) 53'	Report	Sandu (yellow card) 15'; Ojog (yellow card) 71'	Stadium: Malaya Sportivnaya Arena; Attendance: 1,000

27 August 2017 8	Sheriff Tiraspol	3–1	Milsami Orhei	Tiraspol
19:00 EEST (UTC+3)	Oancea 29', 90+4'; Cristiano (yellow card) 43'; Bayala (red card) 47'; Anton (yellow card) 61'; Jairo 84'; Mikulić (yellow card) 90+4'	Report	Jardan (yellow card) 47'; Andronic 79'	Stadium: Malaya Sportivnaya Arena; Attendance: 1,700; Referee: Gabriel Tupicico

10 September 2017 9	Speranța Nisporeni	1–2	Sheriff Tiraspol	Hîncești
17:00 EEST (UTC+3)	Efros (yellow card) 42'; Plătică 45+1'; Pîslă (yellow card) 45+1'; M.Bolun (yellow card) 54'; Bugulov (yellow card) 71'	Report	Badibanga 9'; Damașcan 24'; Kendysh (yellow card) 70'	Stadium: Stadionul Municipal; Attendance: 300; Referee: Vladislav Ivancenco

17 September 2017 10	Zaria Bălți	0–2	Sheriff Tiraspol	Bălți
16:30 EEST (UTC+3)	Onica (yellow card) 39'; Dros (yellow card) 75'	Report	Oancea 27'; Kulušić 38'	Stadium: Stadionul Orășenesc; Attendance: 3,000; Referee: Iurie Rochin

23 September 2017 11	Sheriff Tiraspol	6–3	Dacia Chișinău	Tiraspol
18:00 EEST (UTC+3)	Jairo 2', 7', 27'; Sušić (yellow card) 20'; Brezovec 28', 64', 77'; Anton (yellow card) 87'	Report	Mamah (yellow card) 4'; Olisayev 9' (yellow card) 45+1'; Seoane (yellow card) 30'; Pașcenco 41' (yellow card) 76'; Zasavițchi (yellow card) 57'; Ilescu 73'; Cojocaru (yellow card) 82'	Stadium: Sheriff Stadium; Attendance: 2,000; Referee: Petru Stoianov

1 October 2017 12	Zimbru Chișinău	1–2	Sheriff Tiraspol	Chișinău
17:00 EEST (UTC+3)	Jean Theodoro 15'; Evair (yellow card) 45'; Telegin (yellow card) 68'; Monday (yellow card) 76'; Damașcan (yellow card) 85'	Report	de Nooijer (yellow card) 37'; Anton (yellow card) 53'; Jairo 76' (pen.); Kulušić (yellow card) 89'; Badibanga 90+1' (yellow card) 90+2'	Stadium: Zimbru Stadium; Attendance: 1,500; Referee: Gabriel Tupicico

15 October 2017 13	Sheriff Tiraspol	3–1	Petrocub Hîncești	Tiraspol
16:00 EEST (UTC+3)	Mugoša 19' (pen.); Cristiano 37'; Balima 53'; Oancea (yellow card) 87'	Report	Celeadnic (yellow card) 19'; Ambros 76'	Stadium: Sheriff Stadium; Attendance: 700; Referee: Andrei Cojocaru

22 October 2017 14	Dinamo-Auto Tiraspol	0–4	Sheriff Tiraspol	Tîrnauca
15:00 EEST (UTC+3)	Yeliseyev (yellow card) 52'; C.Ţîbuleac (yellow card) 83'; Zveaghințev (yellow card) 86'	Report	Damașcan 2', 68'; Balima 53'; Badibanga 87' (pen.)	Stadium: Dinamo-Auto Stadium; Attendance: 200; Referee: Dmitrii Muntean

28 October 2017 15	Sheriff Tiraspol	1–1	Sfântul Gheorghe	Tiraspol
15:00 EEST (UTC+3)	Mugoša 38'; Anton (yellow card) 79'	Report	Slivca (yellow card) 57'; Suvorov 90+3'	Stadium: Sheriff Stadium; Attendance: 700; Referee: Petru Stoianov

6 November 2017 16	Spicul Chișcăreni	0–4	Sheriff Tiraspol	Chișcăreni
13:00 EET (UTC+2)		Report	Kulušić 35'; Oancea 37' (yellow card) 68'; Racu 80'; Sušić (yellow card) 89'; Damașcan 90+1'	Stadium: Stadionul Spicul; Attendance: 250; Referee: Gabriel Tupicico

18 November 2017 17	Milsami Orhei	0–2	Sheriff Tiraspol	Orhei
13:00 EET (UTC+2)	Plătică (yellow card) 23'; Mîțu (yellow card) 67'; Bolohan (yellow card) 88'	Report	Kendysh 8', 14' (yellow card) 26'; Racu (yellow card) 28'	Stadium: CSR Orhei; Attendance: 1,300; Referee: Iurie Rochin

26 November 2017 18	Sheriff Tiraspol	0–1	Speranța Nisporeni	Tiraspol
13:00 EET (UTC+2)		Report	Plătică 30'; Bugulov (yellow card) 59'; Țurcan (yellow card) 88'	Stadium: Sheriff Stadium; Attendance: 1,000; Referee: Veaceslav Banari

==== League table ====
Pos	Team	Pld	W	D	L	GF	GA	GD	Pts	Qualification or relegation
1	Sheriff Tiraspol (C)	18	14	3	1	50	14	+36	45	Qualification for the Champions League first qualifying round
2	Milsami Orhei	18	13	1	4	26	12	+14	40	Qualification for the Europa League first qualifying round (Note: Since the winner of the 2017–18 Moldovan Cup (Milsami) qualified for European competition based on their league position, the spot awarded to the Cup winner (Europa League first qualifying round) was passed to the next best-placed team (in this case to the fifth-placed team).)
3	Petrocub-Hîncești	18	7	5	6	25	16	+9	26 (Note: Petrocub ahead of Dacia on head-to-head points: Petrocub–Dacia 3–0, Dacia–Petrocub 0–2)	Qualification for the Europa League first qualifying round
4	Dacia Chișinău	18	7	5	6	23	26	−3	26	withdrew (Note: Dacia Chișinău completed the season but withdrew from the league prior to the start of the next season.)
5	Zaria Bălți	18	7	3	8	28	20	+8	24	Qualification for the Europa League first qualifying round

Source: FMF, Soccerway
Rules for classification: 1) Points; 2) Play-off (only if deciding champion when two teams tied); 3) Head-to-head points; 4) Head-to-head goal difference; 5) Head-to-head away goals scored; 6) Head-to-head goals scored; 7) Matches won; 8) Goal difference; 9) Goals scored; 10) Less yellow cards; 11) Less red cards.
(C) Champions

=== Moldovan Cup ===
25 October 2017 Round of 16	Victoria Bardar	1–3 (a.e.t.)	Sheriff Tiraspol	Chișinău
13:30 EEST (UTC+3)	Orbu 87'	Report	Brezovec 14'; Damașcan (yellow card) 90'; Balima 102'; Badibanga 105'	Stadium: Joma Arena; Referee: Andrey Cheban

Quarterfinal to be played during the 2018 season

=== UEFA Champions League ===
==== Qualifying rounds ====
12 July 2017 Second qualifying round 1st leg	Sheriff Tiraspol (Moldova)	1–0	(Albania) Kukësi	Tiraspol, Moldova
20:00 EEST (UTC+3)	Sušić (yellow card) 25'; Anton (yellow card) 62'; Badibanga 79' (pen.) (yellow card) 80'	Report	Serrán (yellow card) 78'	Stadium: Sheriff Stadium; Attendance: 5,772; Referee: Christos Nicolaides (Cyprus)

19 July 2017 Second qualifying round 2nd leg	Kukësi (Albania)	2–1 (2 – 2 (a) agg.)	(Moldova) Sheriff Tiraspol	Elbasan, (Note: Kukësi will play their home match at Elbasan Arena, Elbasan, instead of their regular stadium Zeqir Ymeri Stadium, Kukës.) Albania
20:30 EEST (UTC+3)	Emini 35'; Roumpoulakos (yellow card) 44'; Pejić 45+1'; Nassar (yellow card) 82'; Shameti (yellow card) 83'	Report	de Nooijer (yellow card) 30' (yellow-red card) 77'; Cristiano (yellow card) 36'; Bayala 56'; Bordian (yellow card) 90+2'	Stadium: Elbasan Arena; Attendance: 1,417; Referee: Irfan Peljto (Bosnia and Herzegovina)

25 July 2017 Third qualifying round 1st leg	Qarabağ (Azerbaijan)	0–0	(Moldova) Sheriff Tiraspol	Baku, (Note: Qarabağ will play their home match at Tofiq Bahramov Republican Stadium, Baku, instead of their regular stadium Azersun Arena, Baku.) Azerbaijan
20:00 EEST (UTC+3)		Report		Stadium: Tofiq Bahramov Republican Stadium; Attendance: 20,000; Referee: Sergey Tsinkevich (Belarus)

1 August 2017 Third qualifying round 2nd leg	Sheriff Tiraspol (Moldova)	1–2 (1–2 agg.)	(Azerbaijan) Qarabağ	Tiraspol, Moldova
20:00 EEST (UTC+3)	Posmac (yellow card) 37'; Damașcan (yellow card) 44'; Brezovec (yellow card) 47'; Badibanga 90+4' (pen.)	Report	Guerrier (yellow card) 28'; Míchel (yellow card) 35' (goal) 86'; Ndlovu 45+3'; Šehić (yellow card) 57'; Agolli (yellow card) 73'; Sadygov (yellow card) 90+4'	Stadium: Sheriff Stadium; Attendance: 8,404; Referee: Roi Reinshreiber (Israel)

=== UEFA Europa League ===
==== Qualifying rounds ====
17 August 2017 Playoff round 1st leg	Legia Warsaw (Poland)	1–1	(Moldova) Sheriff Tiraspol	Warsaw, Poland
21:45 EEST (UTC+3)	Pazdan (yellow card) 27'; Hloušek (yellow card) 59'; Hämäläinen 76'	Report	Brezovec (yellow card) 49'; Cristiano (yellow card) 70'; Bayala 87'	Stadium: Polish Army Stadiumd; Attendance: 17,732; Referee: Aleksandar Stavrev (Macedonia)

24 August 2017 Playoff round 2nd leg	Sheriff Tiraspol (Moldova)	0–0 ((a) 1 – 1 agg.)	(Poland) Legia Warsaw	Tiraspol, Moldova
20:00 EEST (UTC+3)	Balima (yellow card) 80'; Cristiano (yellow card) 85'; Jairo (yellow card) 88'	Report	Nagy (yellow card) 27'; Pazdan (yellow card) 38' (yellow-red card) 39'; Dąbrowski (yellow card) 68'; Kucharczyk (yellow card) 78'	Stadium: Sheriff Stadium; Attendance: 6,237; Referee: Ivan Bebek (Croatia)

==== Group stage ====
Pos	Team	Pld	W	D	L	GF	GA	GD	Pts	Qualification	LOM	KOB	SHE	ZLI
1	(Russia) Lokomotiv Moscow	6	3	2	1	9	4	+5	11	Advance to knockout phase	—	2–1	1–2	3–0
2	(Denmark) Copenhagen	6	2	3	1	7	3	+4	9 (Note: Head-to-head results: Sheriff Tiraspol 0–0 Copenhagen, Copenhagen 2–0 Sheriff Tiraspol.)	Advance to knockout phase	0–0	—	2–0	3–0
3	(Moldova) Sheriff Tiraspol	6	2	3	1	4	4	0	9		1–1	0–0	—	1–0
4	(Czech Republic) Fastav Zlín	6	0	2	4	1	10	−9	2		0–2	1–1	0–0	—

Source: UEFA
Notes:

14 September 2017 1	Fastav Zlín (Czech Republic)	0–0	(Moldova) Sheriff Tiraspol	Olomouc, (Note: Fastav Zlín play their home matches at Andrův stadion, Olomouc, instead of their regular stadium Letná Stadion, Zlín.) Czech Republic
20:00 EEST (UTC+3)	Moses (yellow card) 66'	Report	Sušić (yellow card) 37'; Kulušić (yellow card) 40'	Stadium: Andrův stadion Attendance: 4,499; Referee: Andrew Dallas (Scotland)

28 September 2017 2	Sheriff Tiraspol (Moldova)	0–0	(Denmark) Copenhagen	Tiraspol, Moldova
22:05 EEST (UTC+3)	Kulušić (yellow card) 87'	Report		Stadium: Sheriff Stadium; Attendance: 5,070; Referee: Clayton Pisani (Malta)

19 October 2017 3	Sheriff Tiraspol (Moldova)	1–1	(Russia) Lokomotiv Moscow	Tiraspol, Moldova
22:05 EEST (UTC+3)	Badibanga 31'; Kendysh (yellow card) 39'; Posmac (yellow card) 68'; Racu (yellow card) 89'	Report	An.Miranchuk 17'; Ignatyev (yellow card) 84'; Guilherme (yellow card) 89'	Stadium: Sheriff Stadium; Attendance: 10,500; Referee: István Vad (Hungary)

2 November 2017 4	Lokomotiv Moscow (Russia)	1–2	(Moldova) Sheriff Tiraspol	Moscow, Russia
20:00 EET (UTC+2)	Farfán 26'; Ignatyev (yellow card) 73'	Report	Badibanga 41' (yellow card) 90'; Brezovec 58'; Kendysh (yellow card) 62'; Balima (yellow card) 72'; Victor (yellow card) 90+4'	Stadium: RZD Arena; Attendance: 10,118; Referee: Sébastien Delferière (Belgium)

23 November 2017 5	Sheriff Tiraspol (Moldova)	1–0	(Czech Republic) Fastav Zlín	Tiraspol, Moldova
22:05 EET (UTC+2)	Jairo 11'	Report	Bačo (yellow card) 19'	Stadium: Sheriff Stadium; Attendance: 5,485; Referee: Ola Hobber Nilsen (Norway)

7 December 2017 6	Copenhagen (Denmark)	2–0	(Moldova) Sheriff Tiraspol	Copenhagen, Denmark
20:00 EET (UTC+2)	Zeca (yellow card) 48'; Sotiriou 56'; Lüftner 59'	Report	Cristiano (yellow card) 37'; Kulušić (yellow card) 44'; Racu (yellow card) 45+1'; Jairo (red card) 69'; Sušić (yellow card) 71'; Badibanga (penalty missed) 78'	Stadium: Parken Stadium; Referee: Serdar Gözübüyük (Netherlands)

== Squad statistics ==
As of Match played 7 December 2017

=== Appearances and goals ===
No.	Pos	Nat	Player	Total		Divizia Națională		Moldovan Cup		Moldovan Super Cup		Champions League		Europa League	
No.	Pos	Nat	Player	Apps	Goals	Apps	Goals	Apps	Goals	Apps	Goals	Apps	Goals	Apps	Goals
1	GK	(Croatia) CRO	Zvonimir Mikulić	25	0	13	0	0	0	0	0	4	0	8	0
3	DF	(Moldova) MDA	Ion Jardan	10	0	5+2	0	1	0	0	0	1+1	0	0	0
4	DF	(Moldova) MDA	Petru Racu	24	3	12+2	3	0	0	0	0	4	0	5+1	0
6	DF	(Brazil) BRA	Victor Oliveira	10	0	4	0	1	0	0	0	2+1	0	0+2	0
8	MF	(Curaçao) CUW	Jeremy de Nooijer	24	0	8+5	0	1	0	0	0	3	0	3+4	0
9	FW	(Montenegro) MNE	Stefan Mugoša	21	7	6+7	7	0	0	0	0	3+1	0	3+1	0
10	FW	(Brazil) BRA	Jairo	21	6	9+3	5	0+1	0	0	0	0	0	6+2	1
11	MF	(Norway) NOR	Zlatko Tripić	8	0	3+2	0	0	0	0	0	0	0	2+1	0
14	DF	(Burkina Faso) BFA	Wilfried Balima	17	3	6+3	2	1	1	0	0	0+2	0	0+5	0
15	DF	(Brazil) BRA	Cristiano	29	1	15+2	1	0	0	0	0	4	0	8	0
18	MF	(Moldova) MDA	Gheorghe Anton	26	0	14+1	0	0	0	0	0	3	0	8	0
19	MF	(Moldova) MDA	Artiom Bilinschii	1	0	0+1	0	0	0	0	0	0	0	0	0
22	FW	(Moldova) MDA	Marin Căruntu	1	0	0	0	1	0	0	0	0	0	0	0
24	MF	(Cameroon) CMR	Jessie Guera Djou	3	0	1+1	0	1	0	0	0	0	0	0	0
25	GK	(Moldova) MDA	Sergiu Juric	6	0	5	0	1	0	0	0	0	0	0	0
30	MF	(Croatia) CRO	Josip Brezovec	22	7	6+3	5	1	1	0	0	4	0	8	1
32	MF	(Moldova) MDA	Evgheni Oancea	16	4	11+5	4	0	0	0	0	0	0	0	0
33	DF	(Moldova) MDA	Mihail Caimacov	1	0	0+1	0	0	0	0	0	0	0	0	0
35	DF	(Croatia) CRO	Ante Kulušić	17	2	9	2	0	0	0	0	0	0	8	0
37	DF	(Moldova) MDA	Vitalie Bordian	10	0	4+2	0	1	0	0	0	0+3	0	0	0
39	FW	(Belgium) BEL	Ziguy Badibanga	24	8	10+2	3	0+1	1	0	0	3+1	2	6+1	2
55	DF	(Bosnia and Herzegovina) BIH	Mateo Sušić	28	0	15+1	0	0	0	0	0	4	0	8	0
77	MF	(Belarus) BLR	Yury Kendysh	14	2	5+2	2	0+1	0	0	0	0	0	5+1	0
90	DF	(Moldova) MDA	Veaceslav Posmac	30	2	16+1	2	1	0	0	0	4	0	8	0
99	FW	(Moldova) MDA	Vitalie Damașcan	27	13	14+3	13	1	0	0	0	1+2	0	0+6	0
Players away on loan :
7	MF	(Brazil) BRA	Jô Santos	2	0	1+1	0	0	0	0	0	0	0	0	0
Players who left Sheriff Tiraspol during the season:
20	MF	(Burkina Faso) BFA	Cyrille Bayala	12	3	6	1	0	0	0	0	4	1	2	1

=== Goal scorers ===
Place	Position	Nation	Number	Name	Divizia Națională	Moldovan Cup	Moldovan Super Cup	Champions League	Europa League	Total
1	FW	(Moldova)	99	Vitalie Damașcan	13	0	0	0	0	13
2	FW	(Belgium)	39	Ziguy Badibanga	3	1	0	2	2	8
3	FW	(Montenegro)	9	Stefan Mugoša	7	0	0	0	0	7
3	MF	(Croatia)	30	Josip Brezovec	5	1	0	0	1	7
5	FW	(Brazil)	10	Jairo	5	0	0	0	1	6
6	MF	(Moldova)	32	Evgheni Oancea	4	0	0	0	0	4
7	DF	(Moldova)	4	Petru Racu	3	0	0	0	0	3
7	DF	(Burkina Faso)	14	Wilfried Balima	2	1	0	0	0	3
7	MF	(Burkina Faso)	20	Cyrille Bayala	1	0	0	1	1	3
10	DF	(Moldova)	90	Veaceslav Posmac	2	0	0	0	0	2
10	DF	(Croatia)	35	Ante Kulušić	2	0	0	0	0	2
10	MF	(Belarus)	77	Yury Kendysh	2	0	0	0	0	2
13	DF	(Brazil)	15	Cristiano	1	0	0	0	0	1
				TOTALS	50	3	0	3	5	61

=== Disciplinary record ===
Number	Nation	Position	Name	Divizia Națională		Moldovan Cup		Moldovan Super Cup		Champions League		Europa League		Total	
Number	Nation	Position	Name	Yellow card	Red card	Yellow card	Red card	Yellow card	Red card	Yellow card	Red card	Yellow card	Red card	Yellow card	Red card
1	(Croatia)	GK	Zvonimir Mikulić	1	0	0	0	0	0	0	0	0	0	1	0
3	(Moldova)	DF	Ion Jardan	1	0	0	0	0	0	0	0	0	0	1	0
4	(Moldova)	DF	Petru Racu	1	0	0	0	0	0	0	0	2	0	3	0
6	(Brazil)	DF	Victor Oliveira	2	0	0	0	0	0	0	0	1	0	3	0
8	(Curaçao)	MF	Jeremy de Nooijer	1	0	0	0	0	0	2	1	0	0	3	1
9	(Montenegro)	FW	Stefan Mugoša	2	0	0	0	0	0	0	0	0	0	2	0
10	(Brazil)	FW	Jairo	0	0	0	0	0	0	0	0	1	1	1	1
14	(Burkina Faso)	DF	Wilfried Balima	0	0	0	0	0	0	0	0	2	0	2	0
15	(Brazil)	DF	Cristiano	1	0	0	0	0	0	1	0	3	0	5	0
18	(Moldova)	MF	Gheorghe Anton	5	0	0	0	0	0	1	0	0	0	6	0
30	(Croatia)	MF	Josip Brezovec	1	0	0	0	0	0	1	0	1	0	3	0
32	(Moldova)	MF	Evgheni Oancea	2	0	0	0	0	0	1	0	1	0	4	0
35	(Croatia)	DF	Ante Kulušić	1	0	0	0	0	0	0	0	3	0	4	0
37	(Moldova)	DF	Vitalie Bordian	1	0	0	0	0	0	1	0	0	0	2	0
39	(Belgium)	FW	Ziguy Badibanga	1	0	0	0	0	0	1	0	1	0	3	0
55	(Bosnia and Herzegovina)	DF	Mateo Sušić	2	0	0	0	0	0	1	0	3	0	5	0
77	(Belarus)	MF	Yury Kendysh	2	0	0	0	0	0	0	0	2	0	4	0
90	(Moldova)	DF	Veaceslav Posmac	1	0	0	0	0	0	1	0	1	0	3	0
99	(Moldova)	FW	Vitalie Damașcan	2	0	1	0	0	0	2	0	0	0	5	0
			TOTALS	28	0	1	0	0	0	10	1	19	1	58	2
