= 2018 FC Sheriff Tiraspol season =

Sheriff Tiraspol
2018 season
- Chairman: Viktor Gushan
- Manager: Roberto Bordin (until 24 April); Victor Mihailov (interim) (24 April – 7 June); Goran Sablić (from 7 June)
- Stadium: Sheriff Stadium
- Divizia Naţională: 1st
- 2017–18 Moldovan Cup: Quarter-final
- 2018–19 Moldovan Cup: Semi-final
- Champions League: Second qualifying round
- Europa League: Play-off round
- Top goalscorer: League: Alhaji Kamara (9); All: Ziguy Badibanga (13)
Home colours	Away colours

The 2018 season was FC Sheriff Tiraspol's 22nd season, and their 21st in the Divizia Naţională, the top-flight of Moldovan football.

== Season events ==
On 24 April, manager Roberto Bordin resigned due to family reasons, with Victor Mihailov taking over in an interim capacity. On 7 June, Goran Sablić was announced as Sheriff Tiraspol's new manager.

== Squad ==
As of match played 24 November 2018

No.	Name	Nationality	Position	Date of birth (age)	Signed from	Signed in	Contract ends	Apps.	Goals
Goalkeepers
12	Maxim Bardîș	(Moldova)	GK	16 July 1997 (aged 21)	Trainee	2017		0	0
20	Zvonimir Mikulić	(Croatia)	GK	5 February 1990 (aged 28)	NK Osijek	2018		41	0
21	Nicolai Cebotari	(Moldova)	GK	24 May 1997 (aged 21)	Sfântul Gheorghe	2018		2	0
33	Serghei Pașcenco	(Moldova)	GK	18 December 1982 (aged 35)	Zaria Bălți	2018			
Defenders
4	Petru Racu	(Moldova)	DF	17 July 1987 (aged 31)	Milsami Orhei	2017		24	3
15	Cristiano	(Brazil)	DF	29 August 1993 (aged 25)	Volta Redonda	2018		64	2
22	Vadim Dijinari	(Moldova)	DF	1 April 1999 (aged 19)	Trainee	2018		1	0
23	Vladimir Kovačević	(Serbia)	DF	11 November 1992 (aged 26)	loan from Kortrijk	2018		17	1
26	Ivan Voropai	(Moldova)	DF	21 April 1998 (aged 20)	Trainee	2015		1	0
35	Ante Kulušić	(Croatia)	DF	6 June 1986 (aged 32)	HNK Rijeka	2017		48	5
55	Mateo Sušić	(Bosnia and Herzegovina)	DF	18 November 1990 (aged 28)	Sheriff Tiraspol	2017		132	4
90	Veaceslav Posmac	(Moldova)	DF	7 November 1990 (aged 28)	Dacia Chișinău	2017		66	3
Midfielders
7	Gerson Rodrigues	(Luxembourg)	MF	20 June 1995 (aged 23)	Telstar	2018		33	11
8	Jeremy de Nooijer	(Curaçao)	MF	15 March 1992 (aged 26)	Levski Sofia	2018		12	1
14	Wilfried Balima	(Burkina Faso)	MF	20 March 1985 (aged 33)	US Ouagadougou	2005			
17	Alexandr Belousov	(Moldova)	MF	14 May 1998 (aged 20)	Youth Team	2018		12	3
18	Gheorghe Anton	(Moldova)	MF	27 January 1993 (aged 25)	Zimbru Chișinău	2017		51	2
19	Antun Palić	(Croatia)	MF	25 June 1988 (aged 30)	Dinamo București	2018		18	2
27	Vsevolod Nihaev	(Moldova)	MF	4 May 1999 (aged 19)	Trainee	2017		2	0
32	Evgheni Oancea	(Moldova)	MF	5 January 1996 (aged 22)	Trainee	2016		43	7
37	Artiom Bilinschii	(Moldova)	MF	19 November 1996 (aged 22)	Trainee	2017		5	0
77	Yury Kendysh	(Belarus)	MF	10 June 1990 (aged 28)	BATE Borisov	2018		42	4
88	Rifet Kapić	(Bosnia and Herzegovina)	MF	3 July 1995 (aged 23)	loan from Grasshoppers	2018		24	6
Forwards
9	Jô Santos	(Brazil)	FW	31 March 1991 (aged 27)	Zimbru Chișinău	2016		28	9
11	Abdoul Gafar	(Burkina Faso)	FW	30 December 1998 (aged 19)	Tambov	2018		15	1
39	Ziguy Badibanga	(Belgium)	FW	26 November 1991 (aged 26)	Omonia Nicosia	2017		66	22
45	Alhaji Kamara	(Sierra Leone)	FW	16 April 1994 (aged 24)	Al-Taawoun	2018		24	11
91	Andrei Cobeț	(Moldova)	FW	3 January 1997 (aged 21)	Trainee	2015		14	6
97	Alexandru Boiciuc	(Moldova)	FW	21 August 1997 (aged 20)	loan from Vejle Boldklub	2018		17	3
Players away on loan
16	Vadim Paireli	(Moldova)	MF	8 November 1995 (aged 23)	Trainee	2013		66	6
17	Artiom Rozgoniuc	(Moldova)	DF	1 October 1995 (aged 23)	Trainee	2013		31	0
24	Jessie Guera Djou	(Cameroon)	MF	3 May 1997 (aged 21)	loan from Accra Lions	2017		3	0
Left during the season
10	Jairo	(Brazil)	FW	6 May 1992 (aged 26)	loan from PAOK	2017		24	6
23	Aras Özbiliz	(Armenia)	MF	9 March 1990 (aged 28)	loan from Beşiktaş	2018		4	0
94	Dominik Kovačić	(Croatia)	DF	9 March 1990 (aged 28)	Lugano	2018		3	0
99	Vitalie Damașcan	(Moldova)	FW	24 January 1999 (aged 19)	loan from Torino	2018		46	23

=== Out on loan ===
Note: Flags indicate national team as defined under FIFA eligibility rules; some limited exceptions apply. Players may hold more than one non-FIFA nationality.

No.	Pos.	Nation	Player
6	DF	MDA	Artiom Rozgoniuc (at Sfântul Gheorghe)
16	MF	MDA	Vadim Paireli (at Sfântul Gheorghe Suruceni)

No.	Pos.	Nation	Player
24	MF	CMR	Jessie Guera Djou (at Petrocub Hîncești)

== Transfers ==
=== Winter ===
In: Note: Flags indicate national team as defined under FIFA eligibility rules; some limited exceptions apply. Players may hold more than one non-FIFA nationality.

No.	Pos.	Nation	Player
7	MF	LUX	Gerson Rodrigues (from (Netherlands) Telstar)
11	FW	BFA	Abdoul Gafar (from (Russia) Tambov)
15	DF	BRA	Cristiano (from (Brazil) Volta Redonda)
20	GK	CRO	Zvonimir Mikulić (from (Croatia) Osijek, previously on loan)
23	MF	ARM	Aras Özbiliz (loan from (Turkey) Beşiktaş)
33	GK	MDA	Serghei Pașcenco (from (Moldova) Zaria Bălți)
45	FW	SLE	Alhaji Kamara (from (Saudi Arabia) Al-Taawoun)
77	MF	BLR	Yury Kendysh (from (Belarus) BATE Borisov, previously on loan)
94	DF	CRO	Dominik Kovačić (from (Switzerland) Lugano)
99	FW	MDA	Vitalie Damașcan (loan from (Italy) Torino)

Out: Note: Flags indicate national team as defined under FIFA eligibility rules; some limited exceptions apply. Players may hold more than one non-FIFA nationality.

No.	Pos.	Nation	Player
3	DF	MDA	Ion Jardan (to (Moldova) Zimbru Chișinău)
6	DF	BRA	Victor Oliveira (to (Brazil) Tombense)
9	FW	MNE	Stefan Mugoša (to (South Korea) Incheon United)
11	MF	NOR	Zlatko Tripić (to (Norway) Viking)
24	MF	CMR	Jessie Guera Djou (on loan to (Moldova) Petrocub Hîncești)
25	GK	MDA	Sergiu Juric
30	MF	CRO	Josip Brezovec (to (Croatia) Slaven Belupo)
33	MF	MDA	Mihail Caimacov (to (Croatia) Osijek)
37	DF	MDA	Vitalie Bordian (to (Moldova) Dinamo-Auto Tiraspol)
99	FW	MDA	Vitalie Damașcan (to (Italy) Torino)
—	MF	MDA	Vadim Paireli (loan to (Moldova) Petrocub Hîncești)

=== Summer ===
In: Note: Flags indicate national team as defined under FIFA eligibility rules; some limited exceptions apply. Players may hold more than one non-FIFA nationality.

No.	Pos.	Nation	Player
9	FW	BRA	Jô Santos (loan return from (Romania) CSM Politehnica Iași)
19	MF	CRO	Antun Palić (from (Romania) Dinamo București)
23	DF	SRB	Vladimir Kovačević (loan from (Belgium) Kortrijk)
88	MF	BIH	Rifet Kapić (loan from (Switzerland) Grasshoppers)
97	FW	MDA	Alexandru Boiciuc (loan from (Denmark) Vejle Boldklub)

Out: Note: Flags indicate national team as defined under FIFA eligibility rules; some limited exceptions apply. Players may hold more than one non-FIFA nationality.

No.	Pos.	Nation	Player
6	DF	MDA	Artiom Rozgoniuc (loan to (Moldova) Sfântul Gheorghe)
10	FW	BRA	Jairo (loan return to (Greece) PAOK)
23	MF	ARM	Aras Özbiliz (loan return to (Turkey) Beşiktaş)
94	DF	CRO	Dominik Kovačić (to (Bosnia and Herzegovina) Široki Brijeg)
99	FW	MDA	Vitalie Damașcan (loan return to (Italy) Torino)
—	MF	MDA	Vadim Paireli (loan to (Moldova) Sfântul Gheorghe Suruceni, previously on loan at (Moldova) Petrocub Hîncești)

== Friendlies ==
5 February 2018	Sheriff Tiraspol (Moldova)	0–2	(Slovenia) Maribor	Belek, Turkey
(UTC+6)		Report	Goal

10 February 2018	Sheriff Tiraspol (Moldova)	2–1	(Montenegro) Zeta	Belek, Turkey
(UTC+6)	Kamara; Badibanga	Report	Goal

14 February 2018	Sheriff Tiraspol (Moldova)	2–0	(Hungary) Debreceni VSC	Belek, Turkey
(UTC+6)	Badibanga	Report

27 February 2018	Sheriff Tiraspol (Moldova)	0–1	(Finland) KUPS	Belek, Turkey
(UTC+6)		Report	Goal

5 March 2018	Sheriff Tiraspol (Moldova)	2–1	(Ukraine) Desna Chernihiv	Belek, Turkey
(UTC+6)	Cristiano; Kamara	Report	Goal

== Competitions ==
=== Divizia Națională ===
==== Results summary ====
Overall								Home						Away					
Pld	W	D	L	GF	GA	GD	Pts	W	D	L	GF	GA	GD	W	D	L	GF	GA	GD
28	19	6	3	58	14	+44	63	11	3	0	40	8	+32	8	3	3	18	6	+12

Last updated: 24 November 2018.
Source: See Results

==== Results ====
1 April 2018 1	Sheriff Tiraspol	3–0	Petrocub Hîncești	Tiraspol
15:00 EEST (UTC+3)	Kamara 30'; Gafar 80'; Oancea 82'	Report	Celeadnic (yellow card) 30'	Stadium: Indoor Arena; Attendance: 3,000; Referee: Gabriel Tupicico

7 April 2018 2	Sheriff Tiraspol	3–0	Speranța Nisporeni	Tiraspol
15:00 EEST (UTC+3)	Kamara 20'; Cristiano (yellow card) 28' (goal) 40'; Damașcan 90+1'	Report	Drăgan (yellow card) 74'	Stadium: Sheriff Stadium; Attendance: 1,500; Referee: Alexander Tean

14 April 2018 3	Milsami Orhei	0–1	Sheriff Tiraspol	Orhei
16:00 EEST (UTC+3)	Graur (yellow card) 70'; Cojocari (yellow card) 88'; Mîțu (yellow card) 90+4'	Report	Sušić (yellow card) 43' (yellow-red card) 90+3'; Rodrigues (yellow card) 63'; Badibanga 73' (yellow card) 73'; Kulušić (yellow card) 83'	Stadium: CSR Orhei; Attendance: 1,000; Referee: Gabriel Tupicico

22 April 2018 4	Sheriff Tiraspol	5–2	Dinamo-Auto Tiraspol	Tiraspol
18:00 EEST (UTC+3)	Kamara 38'; Badibanga 59'; Oancea 62'; Rodrigues 72'; Kendysh 83'	Report	V.Rassulov (yellow card) 19'; Onofrei 26' (yellow card) 26'; D.Janu (yellow card) 45+1' (goal) 49'	Stadium: Sheriff Stadium; Attendance: 2,000; Referee: Vladislav Ivancenco

29 April 2018 5	Sfântul Gheorghe	2–2	Sheriff Tiraspol	Suruceni
17:00 EEST (UTC+3)	Istrati 20', 37' (yellow card) 75'; Calugher (yellow card) 41'; Railean (yellow card) 88'	Report	Sušić 17'; Oancea 27'; Posmac (yellow card) 42'; Kendysh (yellow card) 90+1'; Kulušić (yellow card) 90+2'	Stadium: Suruceni Stadium; Attendance: 350; Referee: Ghenadie Sidenco

5 May 2018 6	Sheriff Tiraspol	3–1	Zimbru Chișinău	Tiraspol
18:00 EEST (UTC+3)	Kulušić 7'; Racu (yellow card) 51'; Starîș 53' (o.g.); Rodrigues 73'	Report	Stînă (yellow card) 29'; Pozo 67'	Stadium: Sheriff Stadium; Attendance: 3,500; Referee: Petru Stoianov

13 May 2018 7	Zaria Bălți	0–1	Sheriff Tiraspol	Bălți
17:00 EEST (UTC+3)	Gulceac (yellow card) 55'; D.Cemschi (yellow card) 90+2'	Report	Damașcan 8' (yellow card) 90'; Oancea (yellow card) 84'	Stadium: Stadionul Orășenesc; Attendance: 2,200; Referee: Gabriel Tupicico

19 May 2018 8	Petrocub Hîncești	1–0	Sheriff Tiraspol	Hîncești
19:30 EEST (UTC+3)	V.Slivca (yellow card) 44'; Ivanov 53'; Potîrniche (yellow card) 66'; Celeadnic (yellow card) 90+1'	Report	Cristiano (yellow card) 53'	Stadium: Stadionul Municipal; Attendance: 900; Referee: Vladislav Ivancenco

27 May 2018 9	Speranța Nisporeni	0–0	Sheriff Tiraspol	Chişinău
18:00 EEST (UTC+3)	Bambara (yellow card) 67'	Report	Kulušić (yellow card) 9'; Kamara (yellow card) 49'; Sušić (yellow card) 85'; Gafar (red card) 86'	Stadium: Baza Zimbru; Attendance: 200; Referee: Alexandr Tean

10 June 2016 10	Dinamo-Auto Tiraspol	0–5	Sheriff Tiraspol	Tîrnauca
19:00 EEST (UTC+3)	Jalbă (yellow card) 5'; S.Mateescu (yellow card) 76'	Report	Racu (yellow card) 32'; Oancea 41'; Damașcan 44', 59' de Nooijer 46'; Rodrigues 57'; Kulušić (yellow card) 83'	Stadium: Dinamo-Auto Stadium; Attendance: 200; Referee: Ghenadie Sidenco

16 June 2018 11	Sheriff Tiraspol	4–0	Sfântul Gheorghe	Tiraspol
19:00 EEST (UTC+3)	Kamara 17', 19', 54'; Badibanga 45+1'; Anton (yellow card) 90'	Report	Lungu (yellow card) 68'	Stadium: Sheriff Stadium; Attendance: 700; Referee: Andrei Ceban

24 June 2018 13	Zimbru Chișinău	0–1	Sheriff Tiraspol	Chișinău
19:00 EEST (UTC+3)	Onica (yellow card) 21'; Starîș (yellow card) 45+2'; Iurașco (yellow card) 70'; Prepeliță (yellow card) 90+3'	Report	Rodrigues (yellow card) 36'; Kamara 41'; Anton (yellow card) 74'; Oancea (yellow card) 84'	Stadium: Zimbru Stadium; Attendance: 1,688; Referee: Alexandr Tean

27 June 2018 14	Sheriff Tiraspol	0–0	Milsami Orhei	Tiraspol
19:00 EEST (UTC+3)	Damașcan (yellow card) 52'; Anton (yellow card) 68'; Cristiano (yellow card) 89'	Report	S.Plătică (yellow card) 27'	Stadium: Sheriff Stadium; Attendance: 1,500; Referee: Alexandr Tean

1 July 2018 15	Sheriff Tiraspol	5–1	Zaria Bălți	Tiraspol
19:00 EEST (UTC+3)	Badibanga 11' (pen.), 39'; Kamara 20'; Kendysh 51'; Kovačević (yellow card) 79'; Cobeț 90+2'	Report	Gulceac 42' (pen.); Dros (yellow card) 62'; Gómez (yellow card) 72'	Stadium: Sheriff Stadium; Attendance: 600; Referee: Andrei Cojocaru

5 August 2018 16	Petrocub Hîncești	1–0	Sheriff Tiraspol	Hîncești
20:00 EEST (UTC+3)	Bejan 41'; Mudrac (yellow card) 48'	Report	Kendysh (yellow card) 35'	Stadium: Stadionul Municipal; Attendance: 1,500; Referee: Alexandr Tean

12 August 2018 17	Sheriff Tiraspol	2–0	Speranța Nisporeni	Tiraspol
20:00 EEST (UTC+3)	Sušić 28'; Rodrigues 52'; Kovačević (yellow card) 66'; Oancea (yellow card) 78'	Report	I.Arabadji (yellow card) 46'	Stadium: Sheriff Stadium; Attendance: 800; Referee: Gabriel Tupicico

20 August 2018 18	Milsami Orhei	0–2	Sheriff Tiraspol	Orhei
21:00 EEST (UTC+3)	Bogdan (yellow card) 36'; Plătică (yellow card) 51'; Crăciun (yellow card) 68'	Report	Jô Santos 29' (yellow card) 75'; Posmac (yellow card) 64'; Badibanga (yellow card) 68'; Anton (yellow card) 78'; Cristiano (yellow card) 87'; Kapić 90+1'	Stadium: CSR Orhei; Attendance: 1,200; Referee: Alexandr Tean

26 August 2018 19	Sheriff Tiraspol	2–0	Dinamo-Auto Tiraspol	Tiraspol
21:00 EEST (UTC+3)	Kamara 19'; Oancea 44'	Report	Bordian (yellow card) 63'; Mateescu (yellow card) 77'	Stadium: Sheriff Stadium; Attendance: 700; Referee: Iurie Covtun

2 September 2018 20	Sfântul Gheorghe	1–3	Sheriff Tiraspol	Suruceni
17:00 EEST (UTC+3)	Istrati 58'; Rozgoniuc (yellow card) 60'	Report	Anton (yellow card) 44'; Kulušić 56'; Rodrigues 63'; Palić 78'	Stadium: Suruceni Stadium; Attendance: 200; Referee: VladislavIvancenco

16 September 2018 21	Sheriff Tiraspol	3–0	Zimbru Chișinău	Tiraspol
18:00 EEST (UTC+3)	Posmac 18'; Kapić 45+1'; Anton (yellow card) 49'; Badibanga 75'	Report	Onica (yellow card) 52'; Iurașco (yellow card) 57'	Stadium: Sheriff Stadium; Attendance: 1,920; Referee: Alexandr Tean

22 September 2018 22	Sheriff Tiraspol	5–2	Zaria Bălți	Tiraspol
18:00 EEST (UTC+3)	Oancea (yellow card) 27'; Rodrigues 45', 75'; Kapić 68'; Belousov 84'; Palić 89'	Report	Yermak 13' (pen.); Patric 24'	Stadium: Sheriff Stadium; Attendance: 600; Referee: Andrei Cojocaru

30 September 2018 22	Sheriff Tiraspol	0–0	Petrocub Hîncești	Tiraspol
16:00 EEST (UTC+3)		Report	Potîrniche (yellow card) 89'	Stadium: Sheriff Stadium; Attendance: 600; Referee: Vladislav Ivancenco

6 October 2018 23	Speranța Nisporeni	0–0	Sheriff Tiraspol	Vadul lui Vodă
15:00 EEST (UTC+3)	Sandu (yellow card) 62'; M.Popescu (yellow card) 79'; Tiron (yellow card) 90+1'	Report	Kulušić (yellow card) 24'; Badibanga (yellow card) 40'; Palić (yellow card) 78'	Stadium: Stadionul CPSM; Attendance: 300; Referee: Alexandr Tean

21 October 2018 24	Sheriff Tiraspol	1–1	Milsami Orhei	Tiraspol
17:00 EEST (UTC+3)	Anton (yellow card) 39'; Sušić (yellow card) 72'; Badibanga 76'; Posmac (yellow card) 81'	Report	M.Antoniuc (yellow card) 41'; Crăciun (yellow card) 44'; Rusnac (yellow card) 58'; Plătică 89'	Stadium: Sheriff Stadium; Attendance: 1,000; Referee: Alexandr Tean

27 October 2018 25	Dinamo-Auto Tiraspol	0–1	Sheriff Tiraspol	Tîrnauca
15:00 EEST (UTC+3)		Report	Boiciuc 6'; Cebotari (red card) 45' de Nooijer (yellow card) 73'	Stadium: Dinamo-Auto Stadium; Attendance: 100; Referee: Gabriel Tupicico

4 November 2018 26	Sheriff Tiraspol	4–1	Sfântul Gheorghe	Tiraspol
15:00 EET (UTC+2)	Badibanga 12'; Cristiano (yellow card) 12'; Kapić 53'; Anton 62'; Cobeț 86'	Report	Macrițchii 73'	Stadium: Sheriff Stadium; Attendance: 1,000; Referee: Andrei Cojocaru

10 November 2018 27	Zimbru Chișinău	1–0	Sheriff Tiraspol	Chișinău
13:00 EET (UTC+2)	Damașcan 22'	Report	Posmac (yellow card) 78'	Stadium: Zimbru Stadium; Attendance: 2,850; Referee: Veaceslav Banari

24 November 2018 28	Zaria Bălți	0–2	Sheriff Tiraspol	Vadul lui Vodă
13:00 EET (UTC+2)	Gómez (yellow card) 57'	Report	Boiciuc 30'; Kendysh (yellow card) 72'; Rodrigues 87'	Stadium: Stadionul CPSM; Attendance: 250; Referee: Andrei Cojocaru

==== League table ====
Pos	Team	Pld	W	D	L	GF	GA	GD	Pts	Qualification or relegation
1	Sheriff Tiraspol (C)	28	19	6	3	58	14	+44	63	Qualification for the Champions League first qualifying round
2	Milsami Orhei	28	13	6	9	36	24	+12	45 (Note: Milsami ahead of Petrocub on head-to-head points: Milsami : 7, Petrocub : 4.)	Qualification for the Europa League first qualifying round (Note: Since the winners of 2018–19 Moldovan Cup, Sheriff Tiraspol, qualified for European competition based on their league position, the spot awarded to the Cup winner (Europa League first qualifying round) was passed to the next best-placed team (the fourth-placed team).)
3	Petrocub-Hîncești	28	12	9	7	38	28	+10	45	Qualification for the Europa League first qualifying round
4	Speranța Nisporeni	28	9	11	8	27	26	+1	38	Qualification for the Europa League first qualifying round
5	Zimbru Chișinău	28	9	9	10	28	37	−9	36	

Source: FMF, UEFA, Soccerway
Rules for classification: 1) Points; 2) Play-off (only if deciding champion when two teams tied); 3) Head-to-head points; 4) Head-to-head goal difference; 5) Head-to-head away goals scored; 6) Head-to-head goals scored; 7) Matches won; 8) Goal difference; 9) Goals scored; 10) Less red cards; 11) Less yellow cards.
(C) Champions

=== Moldovan Cup ===
==== 2017–18 ====
18 April 2018 Quarterfinal	Milsami Orhei	2–0	Sheriff Tiraspol	Orhei
15:30 EEST (UTC+3)	Novicov (yellow card) 31'; Plătică 47', 54'; Cojocari (yellow card) 62'	Report	Kendysh (yellow card) 19'; Kulušić (yellow card) 23'; Posmac (yellow card) 88'	Stadium: CSR Orhei; Attendance: 1,000; Referee: Alexandru Tean

==== 2018–19 ====
20 June 2018 Last 16 1st leg	Sheriff Tiraspol	7–0	Iskra Rîbnița	Tiraspol
19:00 EEST (UTC+3)	Cobeț 35', 53', 71'; Rodrigues 38' de Nooijer (yellow card) 67'; Badibanga 75'; Kamara 88', 90+1'	Report	A.Porfiryanu (yellow card) 56'; I.Penradashov (yellow card) 67'	Stadium: Sheriff Stadium; Referee: Andrey Diordev

6 July 2018 Last 16 2nd leg	Iskra Rîbnița	1–9 (1–16 agg.)	Sheriff Tiraspol	Rîbnița
17:30 EEST (UTC+3)	I.Carandașov 50' (yellow card) 85'	Report	Belousov 10', 79'; Rodrigues 12', 27'; Jô 55', 56'; Boiciuc 63'; Kapić 71'; Oancea (yellow card) 85'; Cobeț 90+1'	Stadium: Stadionul Orășenesc; Referee: Ion Bila

26 September 2018 Quarterfinal 1st leg	Sheriff Tiraspol	3–0	Speranța Nisporeni	Tiraspol
19:00 EEST (UTC+3)	Balima 21', 45'; Sušić (yellow card) 41'; Anton 56'	Report		Stadium: Malaya Sportivnaya Arena; Attendance: 350; Referee: Andrei Breguța

31 October 2018 Quarterfinal 2nd leg	Speranța Nisporeni	0–3 (0–6 agg.)	Sheriff Tiraspol	Ghidighici
13:00 EET (UTC+2)		Report	Kovačević (yellow card) 39' (goal) 82'; Balima 56'; Kulušić 60'; Kendysh (yellow card) 64'; Posmac (yellow card) 80'	Stadium: Ghidighici Stadium; Attendance: 100; Referee: Daniel Luca

Semifinals took place during the 2019 season.

=== UEFA Champions League ===
==== Qualifying rounds ====
10 July 2018 First qualifying round 1st leg	Torpedo Kutaisi (Georgia (country))	2–1	(Moldova) Sheriff Tiraspol	Kutaisi, Georgia
18:30 EEST (UTC+3)	Kimadze 24'; Kukhianidze 64' (pen.); Daffé (yellow card) 90+5'	Report	Badibanga 14'; Kulušić (yellow card) 52'; Mikulić (yellow card) 63'	Stadium: Ramaz Shengelia Stadium; Attendance: 7,251; Referee: Aleksandrs Golubevs (Latvia)

18 July 2018 First qualifying round 2nd leg	Sheriff Tiraspol (Moldova)	3–0 (4–2 agg.)	(Georgia (country)) Torpedo Kutaisi	Tiraspol, Moldova
20:00 EEST (UTC+3)	Badibanga 9'; Kulušić (yellow card) 34'; Jô Santos 40', 55'; Palić (yellow card) 80'	Report	Tsintsadze (yellow card) 31'	Stadium: Sheriff Stadium; Attendance: 5,740; Referee: Peter Kjærsgaard-Andersen (Denmark)

24 July 2018 Second qualifying round 1st leg	Shkëndija (North Macedonia)	1–0	(Moldova) Sheriff Tiraspol	Skopje, Republic of Macedonia
20:15 EEST (UTC+3)	Ibraimi 24'; Júnior (yellow card) 48'; Murati (yellow card) 90'	Report	Kulušić (yellow card) 90+1'	Stadium: Philip II Arena; Attendance: 3,696; Referee: Mads-Kristoffer Kristoffersen (Denmark)
Note: KF Shkëndija played their home matches at Philip II Arena, Skopje, instead of their regular stadium Ecolog Arena, Tetovo, due to renovation.

31 July 2018 Second qualifying round 2nd leg	Sheriff Tiraspol (Moldova)	0–0 (0–1 agg.)	(North Macedonia) Shkëndija	Tiraspol, Moldova
20:00 EEST (UTC+3)	Kovačević (yellow card) 8'; Kendysh (yellow card) 78'; Rodrigues (yellow card) 79'; Kamara (yellow card) 90'	Report	Totre (yellow card) 36'; Selmani (yellow card) 45'; Bejtullai (yellow card) 90+2'; Zahov (yellow card) 90+5'	Stadium: Sheriff Stadium; Referee: Ville Nevalainen (Finland)

=== UEFA Europa League ===
==== Qualifying rounds ====
9 August 2018 Third qualifying round 1st leg	Sheriff Tiraspol (Moldova)	1–0	(Iceland) Valur	Tiraspol, Moldova
20:00 EEST (UTC+3)	Badibanga 85'	Report	Finsen (yellow card) 26'; Jónsson (yellow card) 69'; K.Sigurðsson (yellow card) 75'; Hedlund (yellow card) 87'	Stadium: Sheriff Stadium; Attendance: 4,803; Referee: Arnold Hunter (Northern Ireland)

16 August 2018 Third qualifying round 2nd leg	Valur (Iceland)	2–1 (2–2 (a) agg.)	(Moldova) Sheriff Tiraspol	Reykjavík, Iceland
23:00 EEST (UTC+3)	Sigurðsson 40' (yellow card) 71'; K.Sigurðsson (yellow card) 81'; Halldórsson 90+1'	Report	Rodrigues (yellow card) 38'; Cristiano (yellow card) 58'; Kendysh (yellow card) 60'; Badibanga 68'; Jô Santos (yellow card) 88'; Kamara (yellow card) 90+1'	Stadium: Hlíðarendi; Attendance: 1,224; Referee: Alexandre Boucaut (Belgium)

23 August 2018 Playoff round 1st leg	Sheriff Tiraspol (Moldova)	1–0	(Azerbaijan) Qarabağ	Tiraspol, Moldova
20:00 FET (UTC+3)	Kapić 8'; Kendysh (yellow card) 30'	Report	Garayev (yellow card) 46'; Ozobić (yellow card) 79'	Stadium: Sheriff Stadium; Attendance: 5,073; Referee: Harald Lechner (Austria)

30 August 2018 Playoff round 2nd leg	Qarabağ (Azerbaijan)	3–0 (3–1 agg.)	(Moldova) Sheriff Tiraspol	Baku, Azerbaijan
FET (UTC+3)	Medvedev 9'; Slavchev (yellow card) 34'; Guerrier 42'; Ozobić 55'; Garayev (yellow card) 90+3'	Report	Boiciuc (yellow card) 24'; Racu (yellow card) 31'; Kovačević (yellow card) 34'; Jô Santos (yellow card) 47'; Sušić (yellow card) 83'; Rodrigues (yellow card) 90+1'	Stadium: Tofiq Bahramov Republican Stadium; Attendance: 21,350; Referee: Aleksandar Stavrev (Macedonia)
Note: Qarabağ will play their home match at Tofiq Bahramov Republican Stadium, Baku, instead of their regular stadium Azersun Arena, Baku.

== Squad statistics ==
As of Match played 24 November 2018

=== Appearances and goals ===
No.	Pos	Nat	Player	Total		Divizia Națională		2017–18 Moldovan Cup		2018–19 Moldovan Cup		Champions League		Europa League	
No.	Pos	Nat	Player	Apps	Goals	Apps	Goals	Apps	Goals	Apps	Goals	Apps	Goals	Apps	Goals
4	DF	(Moldova) MDA	Petru Racu	25	0	17+5	0	0	0	0	0	0	0	2+1	0
7	MF	(Luxembourg) LUX	Gerson Rodrigues	33	11	17+5	8	0+1	0	3	3	1+3	0	2+1	0
8	MF	(Curaçao) CUW	Jeremy de Nooijer	12	1	7+3	1	0	0	1+1	0	0	0	0	0
9	FW	(Brazil) BRA	Jô Santos	12	5	3	1	0	0	1	2	3+1	2	2+2	0
11	FW	(Burkina Faso) BFA	Abdoul Gafar	15	1	4+9	1	1	0	0+1	0	0	0	0	0
14	DF	(Burkina Faso) BFA	Wilfried Balima	23	3	10+5	0	1	0	3	3	0+1	0	0+3	0
15	DF	(Brazil) BRA	Cristiano	35	1	22+1	1	1	0	3	0	4	0	4	0
16	MF	(Moldova) MDA	Andrei Cobeț	14	6	5+6	2	0	0	1+2	4	0	0	0	0
17	MF	(Moldova) MDA	Alexandr Belousov	12	3	6+4	1	0	0	2	2	0	0	0	0
18	MF	(Moldova) MDA	Gheorghe Anton	25	2	16+1	1	1	0	3	1	0+1	0	3	0
19	MF	(Croatia) CRO	Antun Palić	18	2	10	2	0	0	2	0	4	0	1+1	0
20	GK	(Croatia) CRO	Zvonimir Mikulić	16	0	10+1	0	0	0	2	0	3	0	0	0
21	GK	(Moldova) MDA	Nicolai Cebotari	2	0	1	0	0	0	1	0	0	0	0	0
22	FW	(Moldova) MDA	Vadim Dijinari	1	0	0	0	0	0	0+1	0	0	0	0	0
23	DF	(Serbia) SRB	Vladimir Kovačević	17	1	5+3	0	0	0	3+1	1	2+1	0	2	0
26	DF	(Moldova) MDA	Ivan Voropai	1	0	1	0	0	0	0	0	0	0	0	0
27	MF	(Moldova) MDA	Vsevolod Nihaev	2	0	0+2	0	0	0	0	0	0	0	0	0
32	MF	(Moldova) MDA	Evgheni Oancea	29	5	18+5	5	0	0	2+2	0	0+1	0	1	0
33	GK	(Moldova) MDA	Serghei Pașcenco	24	0	17	0	1	0	1	0	1	0	4	0
35	DF	(Croatia) CRO	Ante Kulušić	31	3	20+3	2	1	0	2	1	3	0	2	0
37	MF	(Moldova) MDA	Artiom Bilinschii	4	0	1+1	0	0	0	0+2	0	0	0	0	0
39	FW	(Belgium) BEL	Ziguy Badibanga	30	13	18+1	8	0+1	0	2	1	4	2	4	2
45	FW	(Sierra Leone) SLE	Alhaji Kamara	24	11	13+1	9	0+1	0	0+1	2	4	0	2+2	0
55	DF	(Bosnia and Herzegovina) BIH	Mateo Sušić	34	2	22+1	2	1	0	2	0	4	0	4	0
77	MF	(Belarus) BLR	Yury Kendysh	28	2	14+4	2	1	0	2	0	4	0	3	0
88	MF	(Bosnia and Herzegovina) BIH	Rifet Kapić	24	6	9+5	4	0	0	2	1	4	0	2+2	1
90	DF	(Moldova) MDA	Veaceslav Posmac	36	1	25	1	1	0	3	0	3	0	4	0
97	FW	(Moldova) MDA	Alexandru Boiciuc	17	3	6+3	2	0	0	2+1	1	0+3	0	2	0
Players away on loan :
6	DF	(Moldova) MDA	Artiom Rozgoniuc	3	0	1+2	0	0	0	0	0	0	0	0	0
Players who left Sheriff Tiraspol during the season:
10	FW	(Brazil) BRA	Jairo	3	0	2	0	1	0	0	0	0	0	0	0
23	MF	(Armenia) ARM	Aras Özbiliz	4	0	2+2	0	0	0	0	0	0	0	0	0
94	DF	(Croatia) CRO	Dominik Kovačić	3	0	1+2	0	0	0	0	0	0	0	0	0
99	FW	(Moldova) MDA	Vitalie Damașcan	11	4	5+5	4	1	0	0	0	0	0	0	0

=== Goal scorers ===
Place	Position	Nation	Number	Name	Divizia Națională	2017–18 Moldovan Cup	2018–19 Moldovan Cup	Champions League	Europa League	Total
1	FW	(Belgium)	39	Ziguy Badibanga	8	0	1	2	2	13
2	FW	(Sierra Leone)	45	Alhaji Kamara	9	0	2	0	0	11
2	MF	(Luxembourg)	7	Gerson Rodrigues	8	0	3	0	0	11
4	MF	(Bosnia and Herzegovina)	88	Rifet Kapić	4	0	1	0	1	6
4	MF	(Moldova)	16	Andrei Cobeț	2	0	4	0	0	6
6	MF	(Moldova)	32	Evgheni Oancea	5	0	0	0	0	5
6	FW	(Brazil)	9	Jô Santos	1	0	2	2	0	5
8	FW	(Moldova)	99	Vitalie Damașcan	4	0	0	0	0	4
9	DF	(Croatia)	35	Ante Kulušić	2	0	1	0	0	3
9	FW	(Moldova)	97	Alexandru Boiciuc	2	0	1	0	0	3
9	MF	(Moldova)	17	Alexandr Belousov	1	0	2	0	0	3
9	DF	(Burkina Faso)	14	Wilfried Balima	0	0	3	0	0	3
13	MF	(Belarus)	77	Yury Kendysh	2	0	0	0	0	2
13	DF	(Bosnia and Herzegovina)	55	Mateo Sušić	2	0	0	0	0	2
13	MF	(Croatia)	19	Antun Palić	2	0	0	0	0	2
13	MF	(Moldova)	18	Gheorghe Anton	1	0	1	0	0	2
17	FW	(Burkina Faso)	11	Abdoul Gafar	1	0	0	0	0	1
17	DF	(Brazil)	15	Cristiano	1	0	0	0	0	1
17	MF	(Curaçao)	8	Jeremy de Nooijer	1	0	0	0	0	1
17	DF	(Moldova)	90	Veaceslav Posmac	1	0	0	0	0	1
17	DF	(Serbia)	23	Vladimir Kovačević	0	0	1	0	0	1
17				Own goal	1	0	0	0	0	1
				TOTALS	58	0	22	4	3	87

=== Disciplinary record ===
Number	Nation	Position	Name	Divizia Națională		2017–18 Moldovan Cup		2018–19 Moldovan Cup		Champions League		Europa League		Total	
Number	Nation	Position	Name	Yellow card	Red card	Yellow card	Red card	Yellow card	Red card	Yellow card	Red card	Yellow card	Red card	Yellow card	Red card
4	(Moldova)	DF	Petru Racu	2	0	0	0	0	0	0	0	1	0	3	0
7	(Luxembourg)	MF	Gerson Rodrigues	2	0	0	0	0	0	1	0	2	0	5	0
8	(Curaçao)	MF	Jeremy de Nooijer	1	0	0	0	1	0	0	0	0	0	2	0
9	(Brazil)	FW	Jô Santos	1	0	0	0	0	0	0	0	2	0	3	0
11	(Burkina Faso)	FW	Abdoul Gafar	0	1	0	0	0	0	0	0	0	0	0	1
15	(Brazil)	DF	Cristiano	5	0	0	0	0	0	0	0	1	0	6	0
18	(Moldova)	MF	Gheorghe Anton	7	0	0	0	0	0	0	0	0	0	7	0
19	(Croatia)	MF	Antun Palić	1	0	0	0	0	0	1	0	0	0	2	0
20	(Croatia)	GK	Zvonimir Mikulić	0	0	0	0	0	0	1	0	0	0	1	0
21	(Moldova)	GK	Nicolai Cebotari	0	1	0	0	0	0	1	0	0	0	1	1
23	(Serbia)	DF	Vladimir Kovačević	2	0	0	0	1	0	1	0	1	0	5	0
32	(Moldova)	MF	Evgheni Oancea	4	0	0	0	1	0	0	0	0	0	5	0
35	(Croatia)	DF	Ante Kulušić	5	0	1	0	0	0	3	0	0	0	9	0
39	(Belgium)	FW	Ziguy Badibanga	3	0	0	0	0	0	0	0	0	0	3	0
45	(Sierra Leone)	FW	Alhaji Kamara	1	0	0	0	0	0	1	0	1	0	3	0
55	(Bosnia and Herzegovina)	DF	Mateo Sušić	4	1	0	0	1	0	0	0	1	0	6	1
77	(Belarus)	MF	Yury Kendysh	3	0	1	0	1	0	1	0	2	0	8	0
90	(Moldova)	DF	Veaceslav Posmac	4	0	1	0	1	0	0	0	0	0	6	0
97	(Moldova)	FW	Alexandru Boiciuc	0	0	0	0	0	0	0	0	1	0	1	0
Players who left Sheriff Tiraspol during the season:
99	(Moldova)	FW	Vitalie Damașcan	2	0	0	0	0	0	0	0	0	0	2	0
			TOTALS	47	3	3	0	6	0	9	0	12	0	77	3
