= 2017–18 Moldovan Cup =

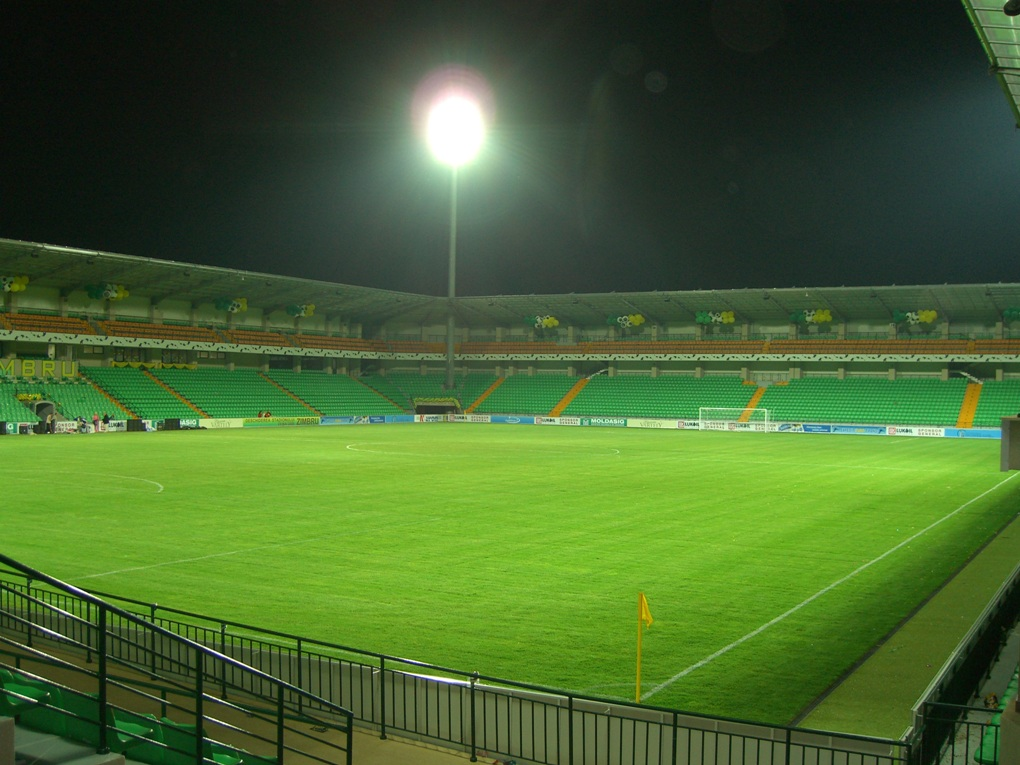
- Zimbru Stadium in Chișinău hosted the final

Tournament details
- Country: Moldova
- Dates: 22 July 2017 – 23 May 2018
- Teams: 50

Final positions
- Champions: Milsami Orhei
- Runners-up: Zimbru Chișinău

Tournament statistics
- Matches played: 47
- Goals scored: 207 (4.4 per match)

The 2017–18 Moldovan Cup (Romanian: Cupa Moldovei) was the 27th season of the annual Moldovan football cup competition. Sheriff Tiraspol entered as the defending champions after winning the 2016–17 edition. It began with the first preliminary round on 22 July 2017, and concluded with the final on 23 May 2018. The winner qualifies for the first qualifying round of the 2018–19 UEFA Europa League.

== Format and schedule ==
Both preliminary rounds and the first two rounds proper were regionalised to reduce teams travel costs. All ties level after 90 minutes used extra time to determine the winner, with a penalty shoot-out to follow if necessary.

| Round | Match dates | Fixtures | Clubs |
|---|---|---|---|
| First Preliminary Round | 22 July 2017 | 14 | 50 → 36 |
| Second Preliminary Round | 25 July 2017 | 4 | 36 → 32 |
| First Round | 12–13 August 2017 | 11 | 32 → 21 |
| Second Round | 19 September 2017, 3 October 2017 | 5 | 21 → 16 |
| Round of 16 | 24–25 October 2017 | 8 | 16 → 8 |
| Quarter-Finals | 18 April 2018 | 4 | 8 → 4 |
| Semi-Finals | 9 May 2018 | 2 | 4 → 2 |
| Final | 23 May 2018 | 1 | 2 → 1 |

== Participating teams ==
The following teams entered the competition:

| **Divizia Națională** the 10 teams of the 2017 season | **Divizia A** the 11 non-reserve teams of the 2017 season | **Divizia B** the 29 non-reserve teams of the 2017 season |
| Sheriff Tiraspol ^{title holder}; Zaria Bălți ^{runner-up}; Dacia Chișinău; Milsami Orhei; Zimbru Chișinău; Petrocub-Hîncești; Speranța Nisporeni; Dinamo-Auto Tiraspol; Sfîntul Gheorghe; Spicul Chișcăreni | Saxan Ceadîr-Lunga; Ungheni; Victoria Chișinău; Sparta Selemet; Sîngerei; Edineț; Iskra Rîbnița; Real Succes Chișinău; Codru Lozova; Grănicerul Glodeni; Cahul-2005 | Prut Leova; Sparta Chișinău; Intersport Sănătăuca; Speranța Drochia; Maiak Chirsova; Florești; Sinteza Căușeni; Bogzești; Ceadîr-Lunga; Congaz; Maiac Cioropcani; Sireți; Anina Anenii Noi; Cruiz Camenca; Slobozia Mare; Fălești; Rîșcani; Codru-Juniori; Cricova; Boldurești; Nistru Otaci; Fîrlădeni; Fortuna Pleșeni; Fulger Ialoveni; Olimp Comrat; Socol Copceac; Steaua-57 Chișinău; Tighina; FCM Ungheni |

Number in brackets denote the level of respective league in Football in Moldova. Teams in bold continue to the next round of the competition.

== First preliminary round ==
28 clubs from the Divizia B entered this round. Teams that finished higher on the league in the previous season played their ties away. Cricova received a bye for the first preliminary round. All matches were played on 22 July 2017.

| Nistru Otaci (3) | w/o | Speranța Drochia (3) |

| 22 July 2017 | Rîșcani (3) | 10–2 | Fălești (3) | Rîșcani |
| 17:30 EEST | | | | Stadium: Rîșcani Stadium; Referee: Nicolae Murzac |

| 22 July 2017 | Cruiz Camenca (3) | 0–4 | Intersport Sănătăuca (3) | Camenca |
| 17:30 EEST | | | | Stadium: Camenca Stadium; Referee: Dumitru Muntean |

| 22 July 2017 | FCM Ungheni (3) | 3–2 | Maiac Cioropcani (3) | Ungheni |
| 17:30 EEST | | | | Stadium: Ungheni Stadium; Referee: Denis Ivlev |

| 22 July 2017 | Bogzești (3) | 4–2 (a.e.t.) | Florești (3) | Telenești |
| 17:30 EEST | | | | Stadium: Telenești Stadium; Referee: Vladislav Ivancenco |

| 22 July 2017 | Boldurești (3) | 1–5 | Codru-Juniori (3) | Nisporeni |
| 17:30 EEST | | | | Stadium: Stadionul Mircea Eliade; Referee: Andrei Șturmilov |

| 22 July 2017 | Fulger Ialoveni (3) | 0–1 (a.e.t.) | Steaua-57 Chișinău (3) | Ialoveni |
| 17:30 EEST | | | | Stadium: Ialoveni Stadium; Referee: Eugen Scorolitnii |

| 22 July 2017 | Fîrlădeni (3) | 5–0 | Sinteza Căușeni (3) | Căușeni |
| 17:30 EEST | | | | Stadium: Căușeni Stadium; Referee: Stanislav Leu |

| 22 July 2017 | Tighina (3) | 3–1 | Anina Anenii Noi (3) | Bender |
| 17:30 EEST | | | | Stadium: Stadionul Șelcovic; Referee: Grigore Vorfolomei |

| 22 July 2017 | Sireți (3) | 0–2 | Sparta Chișinău (3) | Sireți |
| 17:30 EEST | | | | Stadium: Sireți Stadium; Referee: Igor Boșca |

| 22 July 2017 | Slobozia Mare (3) | 5–1 | Prut Leova (3) | Slobozia Mare |
| 17:30 EEST | | | | Stadium: Slobozia Mare Stadium; Referee: Cătălin Pidghirnîi |

| 22 July 2017 | Socol Copceac (3) | 4–1 | Ceadîr-Lunga (3) | Copceac |
| 17:30 EEST | | | | Stadium: Copceac Stadium; Referee: Andrei Diordiev |

| 22 July 2017 | Fortuna Pleșeni (3) | 6–4 (a.e.t.) | Maiak Chirsova (3) | Pleșeni |
| 17:30 EEST | | | | Stadium: Pleșeni Stadium; Referee: Valerii Minciuna |

| 22 July 2017 | Olimp Comrat (3) | 7–0 | Congaz (3) | Comrat |
| 17:30 EEST | | | | Stadium: Comrat Stadium; Referee: Ion Bilea |

== Second preliminary round ==
8 clubs from the Divizia B entered this round. Teams that finished higher on the league in the previous season played their ties away. All matches were played on 25 July 2017.
Speranța Drochia, Rîșcani, Intersport Sănătăuca, FCM Ungheni, Socol Copceac, Fortuna Pleșeni and Olimp Comrat received a bye for the second preliminary round.

| 25 July 2017 | Codru-Juniori (3) | 0–1 | Bogzești (3) | Călărași |
| 17:30 EEST | | | | Stadium: Călărași Stadium; Referee: Andrei Breguța |

| 25 July 2017 | Steaua-57 Chișinău (3) | 3–1 | Cricova (3) | Suruceni |
| 17:30 EEST | | | | Stadium: Stadionul Sătesc; Referee: Denis Ivlev |

| 25 July 2017 | Tighina (3) | 1–1 (a.e.t.) (4–3 p) | Fîrlădeni (3) | Bender |
| 17:30 EEST | | | | Stadium: Stadionul Șelcovic; Referee: Ion Orlic |

| 25 July 2017 | Slobozia Mare (3) | 3–2 | Sparta Chișinău (3) | Slobozia Mare |
| 17:30 EEST | | | | Stadium: Slobozia Mare Stadium; Referee: Petru Stoianov |

== First round ==
The 11 winners from the preliminary rounds joined the 11 Divizia A teams. In a match, the home advantage was granted to the team from the lower league. Matches were played on 12 and 13 August 2017.

| 12 August 2017 | Speranța Drochia (3) | 2–1 | Edineț (2) | Drochia |
| 17:00 EEST | | | | Stadium: Drochia Stadium; Referee: Nicolae Murzac |

| 12 August 2017 | Rîșcani (3) | 1–2 | Grănicerul Glodeni (2) | Rîșcani |
| 17:00 EEST | | | | Stadium: Rîșcani Stadium; Referee: Dmitri Martîniuc |

| 12 August 2017 | Intersport Sănătăuca (3) | 1–0 | Iskra Rîbnița (2) | Sănătăuca |
| 17:00 EEST | | | | Stadium: Sănătăuca Stadium; Referee: Ion Bilea |

| 12 August 2017 | FCM Ungheni (3) | 1–3 | Ungheni (2) | Ungheni |
| 17:00 EEST | | | | Stadium: Ungheni Stadium; Referee: Denis Ivlev |

| 12 August 2017 | Bogzești (3) | 1–2 | Sîngerei (2) | Telenești |
| 17:00 EEST | | | | Stadium: Telenești Stadium; Referee: Andrei Ceban |

| 12 August 2017 | Tighina (3) | 0–5 | Victoria Chișinău (2) | Bender |
| 17:00 EEST | | | | Stadium: Stadionul Șelcovic; Referee: Valerii Minciuna |

| 12 August 2017 | Slobozia Mare (3) | 2–5 | Cahul-2005 (2) | Slobozia Mare |
| 17:00 EEST | | | | Stadium: Slobozia Mare Stadium; Referee: Ion Orlic |

| 12 August 2017 | Socol Copceac (3) | 3–2 | Saxan Ceadîr-Lunga (2) | Copceac |
| 17:00 EEST | | | | Stadium: Copceac Stadium; Referee: Iurie Covtun |

| 12 August 2017 | Fortuna Pleșeni (3) | 2–3 | Sparta Selemet (2) | Pleșeni |
| 17:00 EEST | | | | Stadium: Pleșeni Stadium; Referee: Radu Tobultoc |

| 12 August 2017 | Olimp Comrat (3) | 4–0 | Real Succes Chișinău (2) | Comrat |
| 17:00 EEST | | | | Stadium: Comrat Stadium; Referee: Ruslan Muntean |

| 13 August 2017 | Steaua-57 Chișinău (3) | 2–1 | Codru Lozova (2) | Suruceni |
| 17:00 EEST | | | | Stadium: Stadionul Sătesc; Referee: Gabriel Tupicica |

== Second round ==
The 8 winners from the previous round joined the 2 Divizia Națională sides seeded 9-10, Sfîntul Gheorghe and Spicul Chișcăreni. Steaua-57 Chișinău, Victoria Chișinău and Socol Copceac received a bye for the second round. The home teams and the pairs for 2 Divizia Națională sides were determined in a draw held on 16 August 2017. Matches were played on 19 September 2017 and 3 October 2017.

| 19 September 2017 | Speranța Drochia (3) | 0–3 | Spicul Chișcăreni (1) | Drochia |
| 15:30 EEST | | Report | A. Apostol 44'; Sandu 45+2'; Sofroni 80' | Stadium: Drochia Stadium; Attendance: 300; Referee: Nicolae Murzac |

| 19 September 2017 | Grănicerul Glodeni (2) | 3–0 | Intersport Sănătăuca (3) | Glodeni |
| 15:30 EEST | D. Janu; Maneacov; A. Dobrovinschi | Report | | Stadium: Glodeni Stadium; Referee: Andrei Ceban |

| 19 September 2017 | Cahul-2005 (2) | 1–5 | Sfîntul Gheorghe (1) | Cahul |
| 15:30 EEST | Slivca 73' (o.g.) | Report | Plămădeală 14'; Maxim 30'; I. Cebotari 49'; Suvorov 83'; Ghecev 88' | Stadium: Atlant; Attendance: 500; Referee: Iurie Covtun |

| 19 September 2017 | Olimp Comrat (3) | 0–3 | Sparta Selemet (2) | Comrat |
| 15:30 EEST | | Report | V. Bobrov 39'; I. Pavlov 79', 81' | Stadium: Comrat Stadium; Referee: Petru Stoianov |

| 3 October 2017 | Ungheni (2) | 1–4 | Sîngerei (2) | Chișinău |
| 15:30 EEST | R. Gușan 58' (pen.) | Report | A. Cristioglo 26'; M. Ungureanu 57', 74', 77' | Stadium: Joma Arena; Referee: Andrei Cojocaru |

== Final stage ==
=== Bracket ===
Round of 16
Petrocub-Hîncești | 18
Socol Copceac | 0
Sparta Selemet | 1
Speranța Nisporeni | 2
Sfîntul Gheorghe | 0
Milsami Orhei | 2
Victoria Chișinău | 1
Sheriff Tiraspol (a.e.t.) | 3
Steaua-57 Chișinău | 0
Zimbru Chișinău | 2
Zaria Bălți | 6
Sîngerei | 1
Spicul Chișcăreni | 2
Dinamo-Auto | 4
Dacia Chișinău | 6
Grănicerul Glodeni | 1

Quarter-finals
Petrocub-Hîncești | 2
Speranța Nisporeni | 0
Milsami Orhei | 2
Sheriff Tiraspol | 0
Zimbru Chișinău (a.e.t.) | 1
Zaria Bălți | 0
Dinamo-Auto | w/o
Dacia Chișinău | —

Semi-finals
Petrocub-Hîncești | 1
Milsami Orhei (a.e.t.) | 2
Zimbru Chișinău (a.e.t.) (p) | 0 (5)
Dinamo-Auto | 0 (4)

Final
Milsami Orhei (a.e.t.) | 2
Zimbru Chișinău | 0

== Round of 16 ==
The 5 winners from the previous round and Steaua-57 Chișinău, Victoria Bardar, Sokol Copceac joined the remaining 8 Divizia Națională sides seeded 1-8. The home teams and the pairs were determined in a draw held on 6 October 2017. Matches were played on 24 and 25 October 2017.

| 24 October 2017 | Dacia Chișinău (1) | 6–1 | Grănicerul Glodeni (2) | Speia |
| 13:30 EEST | Punoševac 20'; Bejan 35'; Sténio 47'; I. Mamaliga 54'; Fortes 61'; Olisayev 87' | Report | Maneacov 50' | Stadium: Stadionul Dacia; Attendance: 50; Referee: Andrei Diordiev |

| 24 October 2017 | Zaria Bălți (1) | 6–1 | Sîngerei (2) | Bălți |
| 13:30 EEST | Gulceac 4'; Zahynaylov 10', 14'; Mbala 24'; Marcão 33'; Mihaliov 81' | Report | D. Maga 58' | Stadium: Stadionul Orășenesc; Attendance: 300; Referee: Andrei Cojocaru |

| 24 October 2017 | Steaua-57 Chișinău (3) | 0–2 | Zimbru Chișinău (1) | Chișinău |
| 13:30 EEST | | Report | Douglas 79'; Stînă 81' | Stadium: Zimbru Stadium; Attendance: 200; Referee: Ion Orlic |

| 24 October 2017 | Sfîntul Gheorghe (1) | 0–2 | Milsami Orhei (1) | Suruceni |
| 13:30 EEST | | Report | M. Plătică 12', 38' | Stadium: Stadionul Sătesc; Attendance: 100; Referee: Iurie Covtun |

| 24 October 2017 | Sparta Selemet (2) | 1–2 | Speranța Nisporeni (1) | Chișinău |
| 13:30 EEST | V. Iordachi 81' | Report | V. Titievschi 11', 43' | Stadium: Joma Arena; Attendance: 200; Referee: Iurie Rochin |

| 25 October 2017 | Spicul Chișcăreni (1) | 2–4 | Dinamo-Auto Tiraspol (1) | Orhei |
| 13:30 EEST | Iavorschi 45+1' (pen.), 46' | Report | Bursuc 20'; M. Bucătaru 53'; C. Țîbuleac 61'; Bugneac 68' | Stadium: CSR; Attendance: 100; Referee: Petru Stoianov |

| 25 October 2017 | Victoria Chișinău (2) | 1–3 (a.e.t.) | Sheriff Tiraspol (1) | Chișinău |
| 13:30 EEST | Orbu 87' | Report | Brezovec 14'; Balima 102'; Badibanga 105' | Stadium: Zimbru-2; Attendance: 300; Referee: Andrei Ceban |

| 25 October 2017 | Petrocub-Hîncești (1) | 18–0 | Socol Copceac (3) | Hîncești |
| 13:30 EEST | Ursu 7', 33', 37', 89'; Șumchin 14', 19', 44', 88'; Boldenkov 25'; N. Pempene 35', 66'; Urvanțev 60', 65', 78'; A. Rusu 64'; Onana 68', 74'; Svinarenco 84' | Report | | Stadium: Stadionul Orășenesc; Attendance: 200; Referee: Andrei Breguța |

== Quarter-finals ==
The 8 winners from the previous round entered the quarter-finals. The home teams were determined in a draw held on 27 October 2017. Matches were played on 18 April 2018.

| Dinamo-Auto Tiraspol (1) | w/o | Dacia Chișinău (1) |

| 18 April 2018 | Milsami Orhei (1) | 2–0 | Sheriff Tiraspol (1) | Orhei |
| 15:30 EEST | M. Plătică 47', 54' | Report | | Stadium: CSR; Attendance: 1,000; Referee: Alexandru Tean |

| 18 April 2018 | Petrocub-Hîncești (1) | 2–0 | Speranța Nisporeni (1) | Hîncești |
| 15:30 EEST | Ivanov 84', 90+4' | Report | | Stadium: Stadionul Municipal; Attendance: 400; Referee: Dumitru Muntean |

| 18 April 2018 | Zimbru Chișinău (1) | 1–0 (a.e.t.) | Zaria Bălți (1) | Chișinău |
| 19:00 EEST | I. Damașcan 120+1' | Report | | Stadium: Zimbru Stadium; Attendance: 3,000; Referee: Petru Stoianov |

== Semi-finals ==
The 4 winners from the previous round entered the semi-finals. The home teams were determined in a draw held on 20 April 2018. Matches were played on 9 May 2018.

| 9 May 2018 | Zimbru Chișinău (1) | 0–0 (a.e.t.) (5–4 p) | Dinamo-Auto Tiraspol (1) | Chișinău |
| 19:00 EEST | | Report | | Stadium: Zimbru Stadium; Attendance: 2,000; Referee: Alexandru Tean |
| | Penalties |
| | I. Damașcan (penalty missed); Onica (penalty missed); Golovatenco (penalty missed); Stînă (penalty scored); Pozo-Venta (penalty scored); Țîgîrlaș (penalty scored); Telegin (penalty scored); Jardan (penalty scored) | | (penalty scored) Cheptine; (penalty missed) Yeliseyev; (penalty scored) Jalbă; (penalty missed) Șumchin; (penalty missed) Rebenja; (penalty scored) Țurcan; (penalty scored) Pașcenco; (penalty missed) Bordian |

| 9 May 2018 | Petrocub-Hîncești (1) | 1–2 (a.e.t.) | Milsami Orhei (1) | Hîncești |
| 19:00 EEST | Ambros 19' (pen.) | Report | Bugaiov 13'; M. Antoniuc 120' | Stadium: Stadionul Municipal; Attendance: 1,000; Referee: Petru Stoianov |

== Final ==
The final was played on Wednesday 23 May 2018 at the Zimbru Stadium in Chișinău. The "home" team (for administrative purposes) was determined by an additional draw held on 10 May 2018.

23 May 2018
20:00 EEST

| Milsami Orhei | 2–0 (a.e.t.) | Zimbru Chișinău |
|---|---|---|
| M. Antoniuc 99', 102' | Report |

Zimbru Stadium, Chișinău
Attendance: 8,942
Referee: Bartosz Frankowski (Poland)

| Milsami | Zimbru |

| GK | 1 | (Moldova) Radu Mîțu |
| DF | 2 | (Moldova) Artur Crăciun |
| DF | 6 | (Moldova) Constantin Bogdan |
| DF | 22 | (Moldova) Dinu Graur |
| DF | 23 | (Moldova) Vadim Bolohan | (yellow card) 116' |
| MF | 5 | (Moldova) Mihai Plătică |
| MF | 7 | (Moldova) Vadim Rață | | (substituted off) 64' |
| MF | 17 | (Moldova) Andrei Cojocari (c) |
| FW | 13 | (Moldova) Sergiu Plătică | | (substituted off) 81' |
| FW | 16 | (Moldova) Alexandru Antoniuc |
| FW | 19 | (Romania) Romeo Surdu | (yellow card) 48' | (substituted off) 58' |
Substitutes:
| GK | 50 | (Moldova) Anatol Chirinciuc |
| DF | 3 | (Moldova) Andrei Novicov |
| DF | 4 | (Moldova) Vasile Jardan |
| MF | 10 | (Moldova) Gheorghe Andronic | | (substituted on) 64' |
| MF | 14 | (Moldova) Andrei Rusnac |
| FW | 9 | (Moldova) Maxim Antoniuc | | (substituted on) 81' |
| FW | 18 | (Moldova) Igor Bugaiov | | (substituted on) 58' |
Head Coach:
(Moldova) Veaceslav Rusnac

| GK | 1 | (Moldova) Emil Tîmbur |
| DF | 2 | (Moldova) Victor Golovatenco | (yellow card) 85' |
| DF | 22 | (Moldova) Igor Țîgîrlaș |
| DF | 23 | (Russia) Dmitri Telegin |
| DF | 90 | (Moldova) Ion Jardan (c) |
| MF | 7 | (Moldova) Ilie Damașcan |
| MF | 20 | (Moldova) Cristian Nagornîi | (yellow card) 72' | (substituted off) 98' |
| MF | 21 | (Norway) Willian Pozo-Venta |
| MF | 84 | (Moldova) Alexandru Onica |
| MF | 89 | (Moldova) Eugen Sidorenco | | (substituted off) 54' |
| FW | 9 | (Moldova) Ion Nicolaescu | | (substituted off) 74' |
Substitutes:
| GK | 12 | (Moldova) Victor Buga |
| DF | 27 | (Moldova) Alexei Ciopa |
| MF | 6 | (Moldova) Victor Bogaciuc |
| MF | 10 | (Moldova) Victor Stînă | | (substituted on) 98' |
| MF | 77 | (Moldova) Nichita Iurașco | | (substituted on) 54' |
| MF | 99 | (Moldova) Radu Scoarță |
| FW | 19 | (Burkina Faso) Blaise Yaméogo | | (substituted on) 74' |
Head Coach:
(Moldova) Vladimir Aga

Assistant referees:
Marcin Boniek (Poland)
Dawid Golis (Poland)
Fourth official:
Alexandru Tean (Moldova)

Match rules

- 90 minutes.
- 30 minutes of extra time if necessary.
- Penalty shoot-out if score is still level.
- Seven named substitutes, of which up to three may be used.
