= 2015–16 Moldovan "A" Division =

Moldovan "A" Division
- Season: 2015–16
- Champions: Spicul Chișcăreni
- Promoted: Ungheni
- Top goalscorer: Ghenadie Orbu (22 goals)

The 2015–16 Moldovan "A" Division season is the 25th since its establishment. A total of 14 teams are contesting the league.

== Teams ==
Club	Location
Dacia-2 Buiucani	Chişinău
Victoria	Chișinău
Sheriff-2	Tiraspol
Sfîntul Gheorghe	Suruceni
Zimbru-2	Chişinău
Intersport-Aroma	Cobusca Nouă
Edineţ	Edineţ
Real Succes	Chişinău
Gagauziya-Oguzsport	Comrat
Iskra Rîbnița	Rîbnița
CF Ungheni	Ungheni
FC Codru Lozova	Lozova
FC Spicul Chișcăreni	Chișcăreni
FC Prut Leova	Leova

== League table ==
Pos	Team	Pld	W	D	L	GF	GA	GD	Pts	Promotion or relegation
1	Spicul Chișcăreni (C)	26	22	2	2	85	19	+66	68	
2	Sheriff-2 Tiraspol	26	19	2	5	64	25	+39	59	Ineligible for promotion
3	Zimbru-2 Chișinău	26	15	6	5	53	23	+30	51	Ineligible for promotion
4	Ungheni (P)	26	14	4	8	49	38	+11	46	Promotion to Divizia Națională
5	Dacia-2 Buiucani	26	12	5	9	40	41	−1	41	Ineligible for promotion
6	Gagauziya-Oguzsport	26	11	4	11	43	44	−1	37	
7	Victoria Chișinău	26	11	3	12	38	34	+4	36	
8	Codru Lozova	26	8	8	10	44	51	−7	32	
9	Iskra Rîbnița	26	8	5	13	47	63	−16	29	
10	Edineţ	26	7	6	13	42	47	−5	27	
11	Intersport-Aroma	26	6	8	12	31	48	−17	26	
12	Sfîntul Gheorghe	26	6	6	14	43	60	−17	24	
13	Real Succes	26	7	2	17	29	56	−27	23	
14	Prut Leova	26	4	3	19	30	89	−59	15	

Source: Football Association of Moldova (in Romanian)
Rules for classification: 1st points; 2nd head-to-head points; 3rd head-to-head goal difference; 4th head-to-head goals scored; 5th goal difference; 6th number of goals scored; 7th Fair Play competition
(C) Champions; (P) Promoted

== Results ==
Home \ Away	DAC	ISK	GAG	INT	REA	SPI	PRU	EDI	VIC	SHE	SFÎ	ZIM	COD	UNG
Dacia-2 Buiucani		2–2	1–0	0–2	4–2	0–1	1–2	2–0	0–5	2–1	1–1	1–0	0–3	2–1
Gagauziya-Oguzsport	0–2		3–0	1–2	1–0	4–0	3–0	3–2	1–0	1–3	4–1	0–1	2–1	1–0
Iskra - Stal Rîbniţa	0–2	3–2		1–7	4–0	4–1	6–1	1–1	1–3	0–2	2–1	4–2	2–6	2–2
Spicul Chișcăreni	3–1	1–1	4–1		13–0	3–0	5–1	2–0	1–0	1–2	4–0	1–2	4–0	4–3
Prut Leova	1–3	3–3	2–2	0–5		1–4	2–1	1–3	1–2	2–1	3–5	0–3	2–3	1–4
Intersport-Aroma	2–2	1–3	1–1	0–0	0–1		1–2	1–3	2–1	0–2	2–2	1–2	1–0	5–2
Real Succes Chișinău	1–3	2–0	2–3	0–4	3–0	3–0		2–1	0–2	1–3	1–3	0–1	1–2	0–3
Edineț	1–3	3–0	2–2	1–4	5–3	1–1	5–3		0–1	0–1	4–0	0–1	2–2	2–1
Victoria Chișinău	2–3	2–3	1–2	0–1	1–2	1–2	1–0	1–0		1–3	3–0	0–3	1–0	1–0
Sheriff-2 Tiraspol	2–0	2–0	2–0	1–3	10–1	5–1	0–0	6–2	4–3		3–1	2–0	4–1	0–1
Sfîntul Gheorghe	2–2	5–2	3–2	2–3	1–1	1–1	0–1	3–2	1–1	0–1		1–0	1–2	2–3
Zimbru-2 Chișinău	5–2	4–0	5–0	0–1	4–0	1–1	4–0	1–1	1–1	1–0	4–1		3–1	2–2
Codru Lozova	1–1	3–3	4–2	1–5	1–0	1–1	2–2	1–1	1–2	2–2	4–3	1–1		1–3
Ungheni	1–0	1–0	3–2	1–2	3–1	2–1	1–0	1–0	2–2	1–2	4–3	2–2	2–0	

Updated to match(es) played on 29 May 2016. Source: Football Association of Moldova (in Romanian)
Legend: Blue = home team win; Yellow = draw; Red = away team win.

== Top goalscorers ==
Updated to matches played on 28 May 2016.

Rank	Player	Club	Goals
1	(Moldova) Ghenadie Orbu	FC Codru Lozova	22
2	(Moldova) Eugeniu Rebenja	FC Sheriff-2 Tiraspol	17
2	(Moldova) Viorel Primac	CF Ungheni	17
4	(Moldova) Oleg Molla	FC Spicul Chișcăreni	15
5	(Moldova) Sergiu Plătică	FC Sfîntul Gheorghe Suruceni	12
5	(Moldova) Vitalie Damașcan	FC Zimbru-2 Chișinău	12
5	(Moldova) Eugen Borovschi	Iskra Râbnița	12
