= Damașcan =

Damașcan is a surname. Notable people with the surname include:

- Ilie Damașcan (born 1995), Moldovan footballer
- Vitalie Damașcan (born 1990), Moldovan footballer
