= FC Spicul Chișcăreni =

Spicul Chișcăreni
- Full name: Fotbal Club Spicul Chișcăreni
- Founded: 2014
- Dissolved: 2017
- Ground: Stadionul Spicul; Chișcăreni, Moldova
- Capacity: 1,000
- 2017: Divizia Națională, 10th of 10 (withdrew)

FC Spicul Chișcăreni was a Moldovan football club based in Chișcăreni, Moldova. They played in the Divizia Națională, the top division in Moldovan football. The club was founded in 2014.

== Achievements ==
- Divizia B

Winners (1): 2014–15

- Divizia A

Winners (1): 2015–16

== List of seasons ==
Season	League									Cup	Ref
Season	Division	Pos	Pld	W	D	L	GF	GA	Pts	Cup	Ref
2014–15	Divizia B (North)	↑ 1st	22	21	1	0	98	18	64	Second round	
2015–16	Divizia A	1st	26	22	2	2	85	19	68	Round of 16	
2016–17	Divizia A	↑ 3rd	28	21	3	4	62	22	66	Round of 16	
2017	Divizia Națională	↓ 10th	18	3	5	10	14	35	14	Round of 16	
