= Abdoul Gafar Sirima =

Burkinabé footballer

Personal information
- Full name: Abdoul Gafar Kassoum Sina Sirima
- Date of birth: 30 December 1998 (age 27)
- Height: 1.78 m (5 ft 10 in)
- Position: Forward

Youth career
- Angers SCO
- L'Entente SSG

Senior career*
Years	Team	Apps	(Gls)
2017	Baltika Kaliningrad	14	(2)
2017	Tambov	4	(1)
2018	Sheriff Tiraspol	13	(1)
2019	Artsakh	3	(0)
2019	Armavir	11	(1)
2020	Slutsk	24	(6)
2022–2023	Slutsk	10	(0)
2024–	DMedia		
- * Club domestic league appearances and goals as of 20 November 2023

Abdoul Gafar Kassoum Sina Sirima (born 30 December 1998) is a Burkinabé footballer.

== Club career ==
Sirima made his debut in the Russian Football National League for FC Baltika Kaliningrad on 8 March 2017 in a game against FC Volgar Astrakhan.

On 25 January 2018, Sheriff Tiraspol announced the signing of Sirima.

== Career statistics ==
=== Club ===
As of match played 19 March 2022

Appearances and goals by club, season and competition
Club	Season	League			National Cup		Continental		Other		Total	
Club	Season	Division	Apps	Goals	Apps	Goals	Apps	Goals	Apps	Goals	Apps	Goals
Baltika Kaliningrad	2016–17	Russian National League	14	2	0	0	–		–		14	2
Tambov	2017–18	Russian National League	4	1	1	1	–		–		5	2
Sheriff Tiraspol	2018	Divizia Națională	13	1	2	0	0	0	–		15	1
Artsakh	2018–19	Armenian Premier League	3	0	0	0	–		–		3	0
Armavir	2019–20	Russian National League	11	1	1	0	–		–		12	1
Slutsk	2020	Belarusian Premier League	24	6	2	2	–		2	2	28	10
Slutsk	2022	Belarusian Premier League	1	0	0	0	–		–		1	0
Slutsk	2023	Belarusian Premier League	9	0	0	0	–		–		9	0
Slutsk	Total		10	0	0	0	-	-	-	-	10	0
Career total			79	11	6	3	-	-	2	2	87	16
