= Călărași Stadium =

Football stadium in Moldova

- Stadionul Orășenesc Călărași
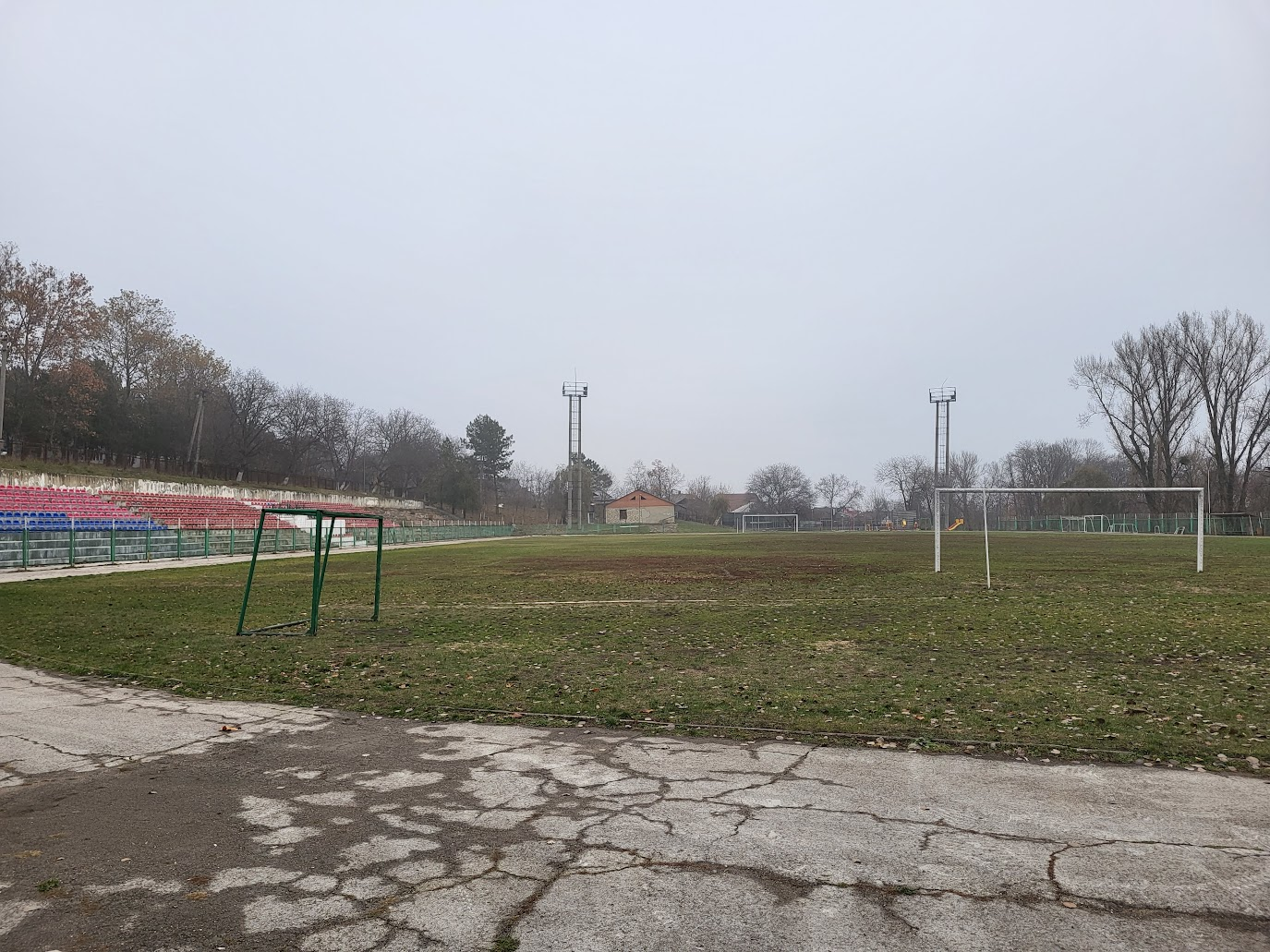
- The stadium in 2023
- Interactive map of Călărași Stadium
- Location: Călărași
- Coordinates: 47.252551°N 28.321943°E
- Owner: Călărași
- Capacity: 5,000
- Surface: Grass

Construction
- Groundbreaking: 2017
- Opened: 2021

Tenant
- FC Codru Calarasi

Călărași Stadium is a football stadium in Moldova. In 2010 it was used by Codru Lozova for their home games.

FC Codru Călărași is the current tenant, playing home matches in Moldovan Liga 2.
