= Cristian Nagornîi =

Moldovan footballer

Personal information
- Full name: Cristian Nagornîi
- Date of birth: 17 June 1998 (age 28)
- Place of birth: Moldova
- Height: 1.75 m (5 ft 9 in)
- Position: Midfielder

Youth career
- Zimbru Chișinău

Senior career*
Years	Team	Apps	(Gls)
2015–2017	Zimbru-2 Chișinău	38	(1)
2016–2019	Zimbru Chișinău	30	(0)

International career^{‡}
2016	Moldova U19 (Note: Only official UEFA matches included)	2	(0)
2018–2019	Moldova U21	1	(0)
- * Club domestic league appearances and goals as of 19 October 2019 ‡ National team caps and goals as of 26 March 2019

Cristian Nagornîi is a Moldovan professional footballer who plays as a midfielder.

== Football career ==
Nagornîi made his professional debut for Zimbru in the Divizia Națională on 1 October 2016 against Saxan, coming on as an 89th-minute substitute.
