= Radu Scoarță =

Moldovan footballer

Personal information
- Date of birth: 3 July 1999 (age 27)
- Place of birth: Vertiujeni, Moldova
- Height: 1.84 m (6 ft 1/2 in)
- Position: Midfielder

Youth career
- 2013–2016: Khimki

Senior career*
Years	Team	Apps	(Gls)
2016	Khimki-M	5	(2)
2017	Zimbru-2 Chișinău	15	(4)
2017–2019	Zimbru Chișinău	28	(3)

International career^{‡}
2015	Moldova U17 (Note: Only official UEFA matches included)	2	(0)
2017	Moldova U19	2	(0)
- * Club domestic league appearances and goals as of 11 August 2019 ‡ National team caps and goals as of 11 October 2017

Radu Scoarță (born 3 July 1999) is a Moldovan footballer who plays as a midfielder. He also holds Russian citizenship.

== Club career ==
He made his Moldovan National Division debut for Zimbru Chișinău on 13 August 2017 in a game against Zaria Bălți.
