= Pleșeni =

- Commune
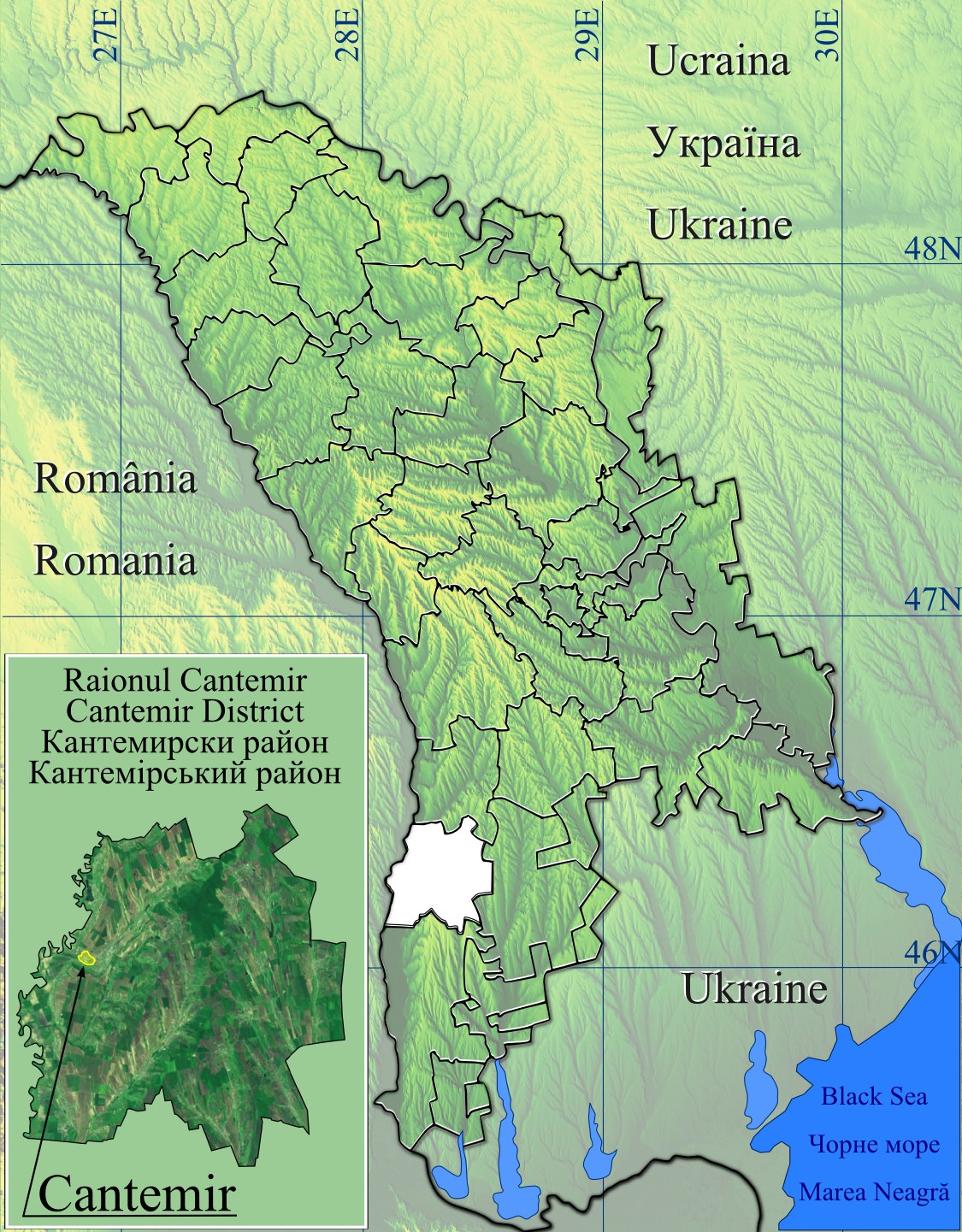
- Location within Cantemir
- Coordinates: 46°21′41″N 28°20′38″E
- Country: Moldova
- District: Cantemir District

Government
  - Mayor: Ovcinicov Alexandru, PCRM
- Elevation: 62 m (203 ft)

Population (2014)
  - Total: 2,903
- Time zone: UTC+2 (EET)
  - Summer (DST): UTC+3 (EEST)
- Postal code: MD-7330

Pleșeni is a commune in Cantemir District, Moldova. It is composed of three villages: Hănăseni, Pleșeni and Tătărășeni.

Pleșeni currently a growing population, between 1975 and 2015 growing 35.8%. Due to the expanding population, the median age is 29.3 years old, below the OECD average. The current population is estimated to be 2931 in 2015.
