= Alexandru Starîș =

Moldovan footballer

Personal information
- Date of birth: 4 January 1995 (age 31)
- Place of birth: Chișinău, Moldova
- Height: 1.83 m (6 ft 0 in)
- Position: Defender

Youth career
- Zimbru Chișinău

Senior career*
| Years | Team | Apps | (Gls) |
| 2013–2017 | Zimbru-2 Chișinău | 43 | (4) |
| 2014–2018 | Zimbru Chișinău | 65 | (2) |
| 2018–2019 | Amvrysseas | | |
| 2019 | Metaloglobus București | 2 | (0) |
| 2020–2021 | Speranța Nisporeni | 25 | (0) |

International career^{‡}
| 2013 | Moldova U19 (Note: Only official UEFA matches included) | 2 | (0) |
| 2015–2016 | Moldova U21 | 5 | (0) |
- * Club domestic league appearances and goals as of 7 May 2021 ‡ National team caps and goals as of 11 October 2016

Alexandru Starîș is a Moldovan footballer who plays as a defender.
