= Jessie Guera Djou =

Cameroonian footballer

Personal information
- Full name: Jessie Jensen Guera Djou
- Date of birth: 3 May 1997 (age 29)
- Place of birth: Douala, Cameroon
- Height: 1.85 m (6 ft 1 in)
- Position: Midfielder

Team information
- Current team: Petrocub Hîncești
- Number: 44

Senior career*
Years	Team	Apps	(Gls)
2017–2019	Accra Lions		
2017	→ AS Monaco B (loan)	3	(0)
2017–2018	→ Sheriff Tiraspol (loan)	2	(0)
2018–2019	→ Petrocub Hîncești (loan)	39	(1)
2019–2021	Varaždin	26	(1)
2021–2022	Shkëndija	23	(0)
2023–2025	Zimbru Chișinău	33	(1)
2025–	Petrocub Hîncești	30	(0)
- * Club domestic league appearances and goals as of 1 June 2026

Jessie Jensen Guera Djou (born 3 May 1997) is a Cameroonian footballer who plays as a midfielder for Moldovan Liga club Petrocub Hîncești.

== Club career ==
On 3 October 2017, Sheriff Tiraspol announced the signing of Guera Djou.

On 1 September 2021, Shkëndija announced the signing of Guera Djou.

On 9 July 2023, Zimbru Chișinău announced the signing of Guera Djou.

On 29 January 2025, Guera Djou joined Moldovan Super Liga champions Petrocub Hîncești on a free transfer.

== Career statistics ==
=== Club ===
As of match played 13 July 2023

Club	Season	League			Cup		Continental		Total	
Club	Season	Division	Apps	Goals	Apps	Goals	Apps	Goals	Apps	Goals
AS Monaco B (loan)	2016–17	Championnat National 2	3	0	—		—		3	0
Sheriff Tiraspol (loan)	2017	Moldovan National Division	2	0	1	0	0	0	3	0
Petrocub Hîncești (loan)	2018	Moldovan National Division	22	0	2	0	2 (Note: Appearances in UEFA Europa League)	0	26	0
Petrocub Hîncești (loan)	2019	Moldovan National Division	17	1	2	0	2	0	21	1
Petrocub Hîncești (loan)	Total		39	1	4	0	4	0	47	1
NK Varaždin	2019–20	Croatian First League	16	1	2	0	—		18	1
NK Varaždin	2020–21	Croatian First League	8	0	0	0	—		8	0
NK Varaždin	2021–22	Croatian First League	2	0	0	0	—		2	0
NK Varaždin	Total		26	1	2	0	—		28	1
Shkëndija	2021–22	Macedonian First League	23	0	1	0	—		24	0
Zimbru Chișinău	2023–24	Moldovan Super Liga	0	0	0	0	1 (Note: Appearance in UEFA Europa Conference League)	0	1	0
Career total			93	2	8	0	5	0	106	2
