= Ion Drăgan =

Moldovan footballer

Personal information
- Date of birth: 14 June 1996 (age 30)
- Place of birth: Moldova
- Height: 1.77 m (5 ft 10 in)
- Position: Midfielder

Team information
- Current team: Cotronei

Senior career*
Years	Team	Apps	(Gls)
2014	Real Succes		
2014–2015	Budăi		
2015–2020	Speranța Nisporeni	113	(15)
2020–2021	Milsami Orhei	33	(7)
2021–2022	Sfîntul Gheorghe	10	(1)
2022	Nea Artaki		
2022–2023	Jonica		
2023	Paolana		
2023–	Cotronei		

International career^{‡}
2016–2018	Moldova U21	10	(0)
2021–	Moldova	1	(0)
- * Club domestic league appearances and goals as of 27 November 2021 ‡ National team caps and goals as of 4 April 2021

Ion Drăgan (born 14 June 1996) is a Moldovan footballer who plays as a midfielder for Italian amateur side Cotronei.

== International career ==
On 31 March 2021, Drăgan made his international debut for Moldova in a 2022 FIFA World Cup qualification match against Israel.
