= Andrei Cobeț =

Moldovan footballer

Personal information
- Date of birth: 3 January 1997 (age 29)
- Place of birth: Tiraspol, Moldova
- Height: 1.86 m (6 ft 1 in)
- Position: Forward

Team information
- Current team: Neftchi Kochkor-Ata

Youth career
- Sheriff Tiraspol

Senior career*
Years	Team	Apps	(Gls)
2018	Sheriff Tiraspol	11	(2)
2019–2020	Dinamo-Auto Tiraspol	27	(2)
2020–2021	Florești	45	(17)
2022–2023	Slavia Mozyr	57	(9)
2024	Torpedo-BelAZ Zhodino	19	(1)
2025	Slavia Mozyr	11	(0)
2025–2026	Milsami Orhei	27	(9)
2026–	Neftchi Kochkor-Ata	0	(0)

International career^{‡}
2013	Moldova U17 (Note: Only official UEFA matches included)	3	(0)
2014–2015	Moldova U19	6	(1)
2022	Moldova	2	(0)
- * Club domestic league appearances and goals as of 16 July 2026 ‡ National team caps and goals as of 21 November 2023

Andrei Cobeț (born 3 January 1997) is a Moldovan professional footballer who plays as a forward for Kyrgyz Higher League club Neftchi Kochkor-Ata.

== Club career ==
On 28 January 2022, he signed a one-year contract with Belarusian Premier League side Slavia Mozyr. On 20 March 2022, he made his debut for the club in a 3–0 loss against BATE Borisov.

== International career ==
He has represented Moldova at under-17 and under-19 level. On 10 June 2022, he made his senior international debut for the country in a 2022–23 UEFA Nations League D match against Latvia as a substitute.
