= Ante Kulušić =

Croatian footballer

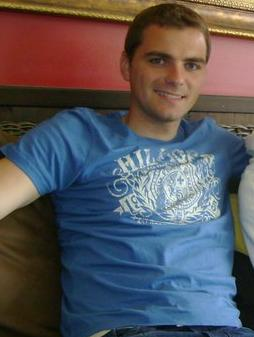

Personal information
- Full name: Ante Kulušić
- Date of birth: 6 June 1986 (age 40)
- Place of birth: Šibenik, SFR Yugoslavia
- Height: 1.89 m (6 ft 2 1/2 in)
- Position: Centre back

Youth career
- –2003: DOŠK Drniš

Senior career*
Years	Team	Apps	(Gls)
2003–2005	Šibenik		
2005–2006	Zagora Unešić		
2006–2009	Šibenik	60	(1)
2009–2010	Hacettepe	47	(1)
2010–2014	Gençlerbirliği	86	(7)
2014–2015	Balıkesirspor	29	(4)
2015–2017	Gençlerbirliği	33	(3)
2017	Rijeka	5	(0)
2017–2019	Sheriff Tiraspol	32	(4)
2019–2022	Ankaragücü	63	(0)

International career^{‡}
2008	Croatia U21	6	(0)
- * Club domestic league appearances and goals as of 1 October 2022 ‡ National team caps and goals as of 22 March 2012

Ante Kulušić (born 6 June 1986) is a Croatian retired footballer who last played as a defender for Turkish club Ankaragücü.

== Early life and career ==
He was born in Šibenik, but pulls roots from the village Miljevci near birth town Šibenik in Šibenik-Knin County.

=== Club career ===
He played until 2003 for youth team of DOŠK Drniš, local football team based in Drniš, Šibenik-Knin County. After, he played for birth town club HNK Šibenik from 2003 to 2005. He went in Zagora Unešić, one more local football club based in Šibenik-Knin County, from Unešić village. After Croatia, he went in Turkey at Hacettepe and after in Gençlerbirligi and Balikesirspor. In 2017, he come back in Croatia, where he signed with Croatian First Football League club HNK Rijeka, where he was very little. On 1 August, signed contract with Moldavian Sheriff Tiraspol. In February 2019 Ante sign for Ankaragücü in the Turkey Süper Lig.

=== International career ===
In 2008 he capped for Croatia U21 football team.

== Honours ==
HNK Rijeka

- Croatian First Football League: 2016–17
- Croatian Football Cup: 2016–17

FC Sheriff Tiraspol

- Moldovan Divizia Națională: 2017, 2018
