= Dmitri Telegin =

Russian footballer

Personal information
- Full name: Dmitri Nikolayevich Telegin
- Date of birth: 2 February 1992 (age 34)
- Place of birth: Saint Petersburg, Russia
- Height: 1.82 m (6 ft 0 in)
- Position: Defender

Youth career
- 1999–2010: DYuSSh Smena
- 2010–2012: Zenit Saint Petersburg

Senior career*
| Years | Team | Apps | (Gls) |
| 2011–2012 | Zenit Saint Petersburg | 0 | (0) |
| 2012 | → Tom Tomsk (loan) | 0 | (0) |
| 2014 | Saxan Ceadîr-Lunga | 9 | (0) |
| 2014 | Yenisey Krasnoyarsk | 2 | (0) |
| 2015 | Novokuznetsk | 2 | (0) |
| 2016 | TSK Simferopol | 7 | (0) |
| 2017–2018 | Zimbru Chișinău | 38 | (0) |
| 2019 | Baltavto Saint Petersburg | | |
- * Club domestic league appearances and goals

Dmitri Nikolayevich Telegin (Russian: Дмитрий Николаевич Телегин; born 2 February 1992) is a Russian former footballer who played as a defender.

== Club career ==
He made his professional debut in the Russian Football National League for Yenisey Krasnoyarsk on 6 July 2014 in a game against Sokol Saratov.
