= Andrey Yeliseyev =

Russian footballer

Personal information
- Full name: Andrey Vitalyevich Yeliseyev
- Date of birth: 22 May 1991 (age 35)
- Place of birth: Perm, Russian SFSR
- Height: 1.86 m (6 ft 1 in)
- Position: Midfielder

Senior career*
Years	Team	Apps	(Gls)
2011	FC Znamya Truda Orekhovo-Zuyevo	29	(1)
2012–2013	FC Chita	15	(0)
2013–2015	FC Nosta Novotroitsk	46	(8)
2015	FC Zenit-Izhevsk	16	(0)
2016	FC Afips Afipsky	9	(0)
2016	FC Baltika Kaliningrad	5	(0)
2017	FC Titan Klin		
2017–2018	FC Dinamo-Auto Tiraspol	14	(0)
2018–2022	FC Zvezda Perm	80	(7)
2022–2023	FC Irtysh Omsk	28	(1)
2024	FC Mashuk-KMV Pyatigorsk	4	(0)
- * Club domestic league appearances and goals as of 8 June 2024

Andrey Vitalyevich Yeliseyev (Russian: Андре́й Вита́льевич Елисе́ев; born 22 May 1991) is a Russian football midfielder.

== Club career ==
He made his debut in the Russian Second Division for FC Znamya Truda Orekhovo-Zuyevo on 21 April 2011 in a game against FC Saturn-2 Moscow Oblast.

He made his Russian Football National League debut for FC Baltika Kaliningrad on 11 July 2016 in a game against FC Shinnik Yaroslavl.
