= Petru Racu =

Moldovan footballer

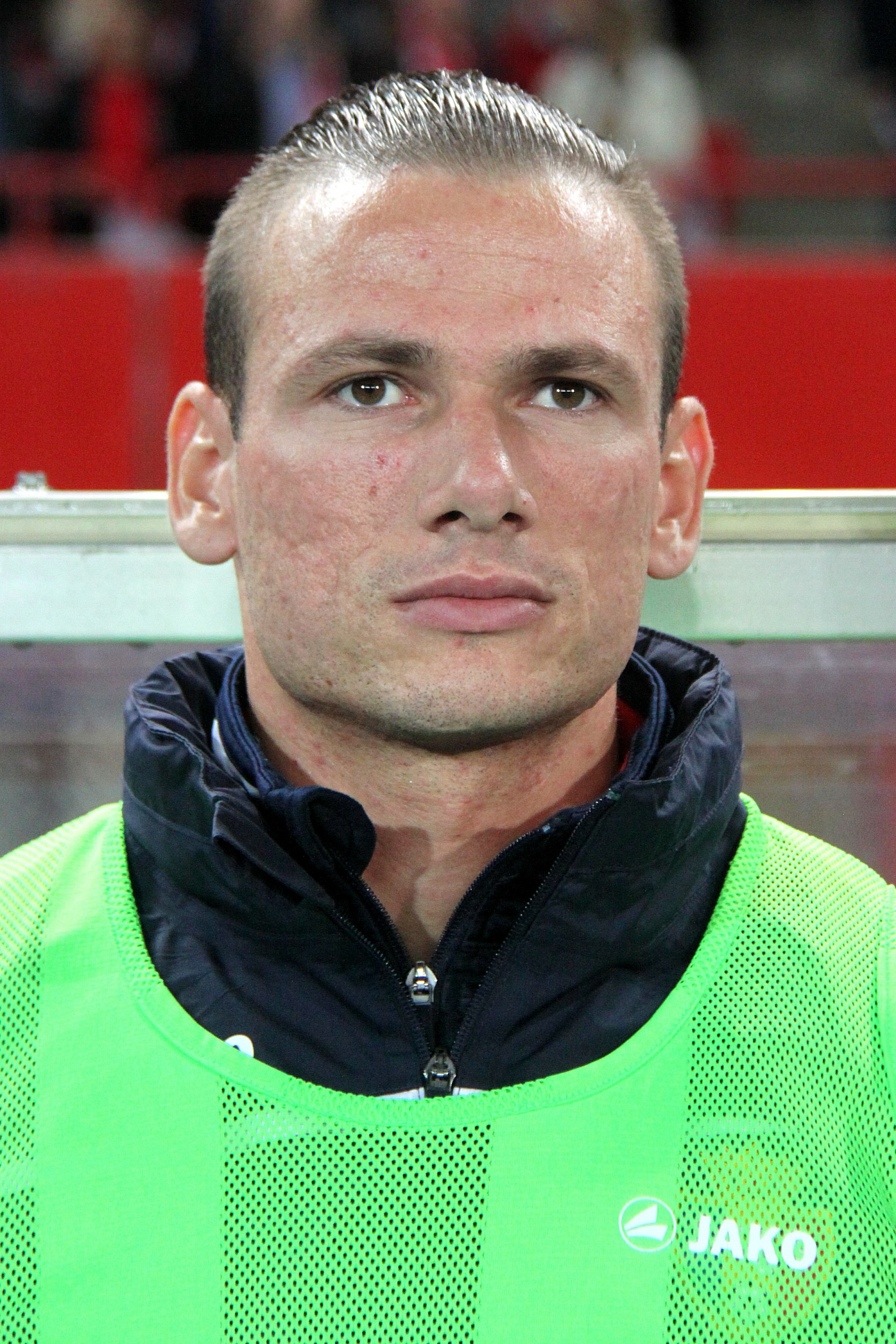
- Racu with Moldova in 2015

Personal information
- Date of birth: 17 July 1987 (age 39)
- Place of birth: Chișinău, Moldavian SSR, Soviet Union
- Height: 1.84 m (6 ft 0 in)
- Position: Centre back

Senior career*
Years	Team	Apps	(Gls)
2003–2007	Zimbru Chișinău	42	(4)
2007–2012	Norrköping	85	(11)
2008	→ MyPa (loan)	8	(2)
2012–2013	Hjørring	7	(0)
2013–2015	Veris Chișinău	39	(10)
2015–2017	Milsami Orhei	54	(11)
2017–2018	Sheriff Tiraspol	50	(3)
2019	Neftçi Baku	3	(0)
2019	Petrolul Ploiești	3	(0)
2020–2021	Petrocub Hîncești	29	(3)
2021–2023	Milsami Orhei	34	(1)
Total		354	(45)

International career
2010–2020	Moldova	50	(0)
- * Club domestic league appearances and goals

Petru Racu (born 17 July 1987) is a Moldovan entrepreneur and former footballer. He is the founder and CEO of VEGETAL, a leading Moldavian company that produces cold pressed oils from different seeds.

Racu was a physically strong and aggressive defender who played in countries like Sweden, Finland, Denmark, Azerbaijan, Romania and Moldova. He played 50 matches for the Moldavian national team.

== Club career ==
=== Zimbru Chișinău ===
Racu made his professional debut with Zimbru Chișinău in the Moldovan league in 2003. He won his first trophy in June 2004 at the age of sixteen by helping Zimbru win the Moldovan Cup.

At the end of the 2003–04 season he was named "Best Young Player of the Year" by the Moldovan Football Federation.

=== IFK Norrköping ===
In February 2007, Racu moved to Swedish club IFK Norrköping, where he played successfully for five years.

During the 2008 season, he was loaned to the Finnish club MYPA and managed to scored a goal on his debut.

=== FC Hjørring ===
In January 2012, Racu transferred to the Danish club FC Hjørring.

=== Veris Chișinău ===
After playing for 6 years in Scandinavia, Racu returned to Moldovan football in 2013, signed with FC Veris Chișinău and become bronze medalist in 2013-14 Moldovan National Division.

In December 2014 he was named "Best Moldovan Defender" by the Moldovan Football Federation.

=== Milsami Orhei ===
In January 2015, Racu signed with Milsami Orhei and won its first league title 2014-15 Moldovan National Division, becoming the first team to take the title away from the cities of Chișinău and FC Sheriff Tiraspol.

Racu scored the winning goal in the UEFA Champions League qualification match against Ludogorets Razgrad, a game that ended 2–1.

=== Sheriff Tiraspol ===
In the summer of 2017, Racu moved to fellow Moldovan club Sheriff Tiraspol. He won the Moldovan National Division with Sheriff Tiraspol in 2017 and 2018.

In the 2017–18 UEFA Europa League season, Sheriff Tiraspol reached the group stage and Racu played in all six group matches.

=== Neftçi Baku ===
On 15 February 2019, Racu joined his old manager Roberto Bordin at Neftçi Baku, signing until the end of the 2018–19 season. At the end of that season Racu became silver medalist with Neftçi Baku.

=== Petrolul Ploiești ===
On 9 July 2019, Racu signed a contract with Romanian Liga II side Petrolul Ploiești.

=== Petrocub Hincesti ===
In January 2020, Racu returned to Moldova and joined FC Petrocub Hîncești Racu helped the club to win his first major trophy Moldovan Cup and become silver medalist in Moldovan National Division, best season and performance in club history.

=== Milsami Orhei ===
In summer 2021, Racu returned to the Red Eagles FC Milsami Orhei and finished his 20-year professional career in the summer of 2023. https://moldfootball.com/ro/news/petru-raku-zavershil-svoju-kar-eru-futbolista

== International career ==
On 11 August 2010, Racu debuted in Moldova national football team, in a friendly match 0–0 against Georgia. He played in total 50 games from 2010 to 2020 for Moldova national football team.

== Personal life ==
Racu was raised in Chișinău in Moldova. He has one sibling, Dorin. He holds two citizenships, of Moldova and of Sweden. He speaks four languages fluently: Romanian, English, Russian and Swedish.

In June 2020, Racu successfully completed the bachelor's exam at the Faculty of International Law of the Free International University of the Republic of Moldova "ULIM". The subject of the dissertation was "Advisory Bodies in the Institutional System of the European Union: Structure and Functions."

In 2008, Racu married Mix Haxholm. They divorced in 2015.

In March 2021, Petru married Elizaveta Zburliuc.

=== Body art ===
Petru has more than 25 tattoos, including one in honour of his mother, Maria, who died in November 2020 of COVID-19; in addition, he also has tattoos of viking, Jason Voorhees, Dovahkiin, wolf, tiger, eagle, grizzly bear, French Bulldog, shark, dagger, mace and lots of others.

== Business ==
In November 2021, Racu launched the production of Vegetal cold-pressed oils. The factory is located in the village of Ghidighici, Chișinău. In August 2022, Vegetal became first and only company from the Republic of Moldova, in the field, certified ECO according to Regulation EC 834/07 by the International Certifying Body CERES GmbH Germany. In summer 2023 have become ISO Standard Certification 22000 issued in the UK.

== Honours ==
=== Zimbru Chișinău ===
- Moldovan Cup Winner 2004
- Bronze medalist Moldovan National Division 2004

=== IFK Norrköping ===
- Champion Swedish Superettan 2007
- Silver medalist Swedish Superettan 2010

=== Veris Chișinău ===
- Bronze medalist Moldovan National Division 2014

=== Milsami Orhei ===
- Champion Moldovan National Division 2015
- Bronze medalist Moldovan National Division 2017

=== Sheriff Tiraspol ===
- Champion Moldovan National Division 2017
- Champion Moldovan National Division 2018

=== Neftçi Baku ===
- Silver medalist Azerbaijan Premier League 2019

=== Petrocub Hincesti ===
- Moldovan Cup Winner 2020
- Silver medalist Moldovan National Division 2020

=== Milsami Orhei ===
- Bronze medalist Moldovan National Division 2022

=== Individual ===
- Best Moldovan Young Player of the year 2004 by the Moldovan Football Federation
- Best Moldovan Defender of the year 2014 by the Moldovan Football Federation
