= Chișcăreni =

- Commune
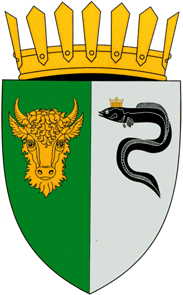
- Coat of arms

- Location within Moldova
- Coordinates: 47.5566666667°N 28.0075°E
- Country: Moldova

Government
  - Mayor: Andrei Crăciun
- Elevation: 96 m (315 ft)

Population (2014)
  - Total: 4,890
- Time zone: UTC+2 (EET)
  - Summer (DST): UTC+3 (EEST)
- Postal code: MD-6216

Chișcăreni is a commune in Sîngerei District, Moldova. It is composed of three villages: Chișcăreni, Nicolaevca and Slobozia-Chișcăreni.
