= Ilie Damașcan =

Moldovan footballer

Personal information
- Date of birth: 12 October 1995 (age 31)
- Place of birth: Soroca, Moldova
- Height: 1.72 m (5 ft 8 in)
- Position: Forward

Team information
- Current team: Spartanii Sportul
- Number: 7

Youth career
- 2006–2010: ȘS Soroca
- 2010–2012: Zimbru Chișinău

Senior career*
Years	Team	Apps	(Gls)
2013–2016	Zimbru-2 Chișinău	59	(32)
2014–2018	Zimbru Chișinău	85	(11)
2019	Banants	11	(0)
2019–2020	Petrocub Hîncești	14	(3)
2020	Turris Turnu Măgurele	8	(1)
2021	Farul Constanța	11	(5)
2021	Unirea Constanța	4	(0)
2021–2022	Sfîntul Gheorghe	19	(4)
2022–2023	Zimbru Chișinău	30	(1)
2024	Bălți	10	(0)
2024–	Spartanii Sportul	14	(1)

International career^{‡}
2013	Moldova U19 (Note: Only official UEFA matches included)	2	(0)
2015–2016	Moldova U21	8	(0)
- * Club domestic league appearances and goals as of 5 January 2025 ‡ National team caps and goals as of 12 October 2016

Ilie Damașcan (born 12 October 1995) is a Moldovan footballer who plays as a forward for Spartanii Sportul.

Damașcan's younger brother, Vitalie is also a professional footballer who plays for Sepsi OSK and represents Moldova.

== Career ==
On 23 February 2019, Damașcan signed for FC Banants, being released by mutual consent on 1 June 2019.

== Honours ==
Zimbru Chișinău

- Moldovan Cup (1): 2013–14
- Moldovan Super Cup (1): 2014
