= 2015–16 Moldovan National Division =

Moldovan National Division
- Season: 2015–16
- Champions: Sheriff Tiraspol
- Champions League: Sheriff Tiraspol
- Europa League: Dacia Chișinău; Zimbru Chișinău; Zaria Bălți
- Matches: 135
- Goals: 308 (2.28 per match)
- Top goalscorer: Danijel Subotić(12 goals)
- Biggest home win: Milsami 5–0 CSF Speranța (15 August 2015)
- Biggest away win: CS Petrocub 0–4 CSF Speranța (26 July 2015); Academia 1–5 Zimbru (18 September 2015); Dinamo-Auto 0–4 Zimbru (13 March 2016); CSF Speranța 0–4 Milsami (18 March 2016)
- Highest scoring: Zaria 5–1 CS Petrocub (28 August 2015); Academia 1–5 Zimbru (18 September 2015); Zaria 4–2 Zimbru (6 May 2016); CS Petrocub 4–2 Academia (7 May 2016); Zaria 4–2 CS Petrocub (15 May 2016)
- Longest winning run: Dacia Chișinău (10 games)
- Longest unbeaten run: Dacia Chișinău (23 games)
- Longest winless run: FC Saxan (24 games)
- Longest losing run: CSF Speranța (7 games)
- Highest attendance: Zaria 5,000
- Lowest attendance: Academia 50
- Average attendance: Zaria 2,925
- All statistics correct as of 24 May 2016.

The 2015–16 Moldovan National Division (Romanian: Divizia Națională) is the 25th season of top-tier football in Moldova. The competition began in July 2015 and will end in May 2016. Milsami Orhei are the defending champions.

== Teams ==
FC Petrocub Hîncești, runners-up of the 2014–15 "A" Division, promoted to the National Division for the first time since the 2002–03 season. Speranța Nisporeni, which became third in the 2014–15 "A" Division, returns to the highest level for the first time since the 1997–98 season. Both teams achieved their second consecutive promotion. The champions of the 2014–15 "A" Division, FC Sheriff-2, are not allowed to play in the same league as the first Sheriff team, and thus were not promoted.

=== Stadia and locations ===
Location of teams in National Division 2015–16

Club	Location	Stadium	Capacity
Academia Chișinău	Chișinău	Stadionul CPSN	1,000
CS Petrocub	Sărata-Galbenă	Stadionul Orășenesc Hîncești	1,500
Dacia Chișinău	Chișinău	Stadionul Moldova (Speia)	8,550
Dinamo-Auto Tiraspol	Tiraspol	Dinamo-Auto Stadium	1,300
Milsami Orhei	Orhei	CSR Orhei	2,539
Zaria Bălți	Bălți	Olimpia Bălți Stadium	5,953
Saxan Gagauz Yeri	Ceadîr-Lunga	Ceadîr-Lunga Stadium	2,000
Sheriff Tiraspol	Tiraspol	Sheriff Stadium	12,746
CSF Speranța	Nisporeni	Stadionul Mircea Eliade	2,500
Zimbru Chișinău	Chișinău	Zimbru Stadium	10,400

=== Personnel and sponsorship ===
Team	Home city	Head coach	Kit manufacturer	Shirt sponsor
Academia	Chișinău	(Moldova) Vlad Goian	Macron	
CS Petrocub	Sărata-Galbenă	(Moldova) Eduard Blănuță	Joma	Moldova Agroindbank
Dacia	Chișinău	(Ukraine) Oleg Bezhenar	Puma	-
Dinamo-Auto	Tiraspol	(Moldova) Nicolae Mandrîcenco	Umbro	Ipotecniy
Milsami	Orhei	(Moldova) Adrian Sosnovschi	Joma	Dufremol
Zaria	Bălți	(Ukraine) Ihor Rakhayev	Acerbis	Simtravel
Saxan Ceadîr-Lunga	Ceadîr-Lunga	(Moldova) Oleg Fistican	Kelme	
Sheriff	Tiraspol	(Croatia) Zoran Vulić	Adidas	IDC
CSF Speranța	Nisporeni	(Moldova) Cristian Efros	Nike	Orom Imexpo
Zimbru	Chișinău	(Romania) Flavius Stoican	Puma	Obolon

== Managerial changes ==
Team	Outgoing manager	Manner of departure	Date of vacancy	Position in table	Incoming manager	Date of appointment
Sheriff	(Croatia) Zoran Zekić	Mutual consent	26 May 2015	preseason	(Moldova) Lilian Popescu	1 June 2015
Saxan	(Moldova) Ivan Burduniuc	Mutual consent	29 May 2015	preseason	(Moldova) Vlad Goian	29 May 2015
Zimbru Chișinău	(Moldova) Veaceslav Rusnac	Mutual consent	16 June 2015	preseason	(Romania) Ștefan Stoica	16 June 2015
Dinamo-Auto	(Moldova) Igor Negrescu	Mutual consent	29 June 2015	preseason	(Moldova) Nicolae Mandrîcenco	29 June 2015
Zaria Bălți	(Moldova) Serghei Dubrovin	Mutual consent	24 July 2015	preseason	(Moldova) Veaceslav Rogac	24 July 2015
Academia	(Moldova) Vladimir Vusatîi	Mutual consent	24 July 2015	preseason	(Ukraine) Yuriy Hroshev	24 July 2015
Dacia Chișinău	(Russia) Igor Dobrovolski	Sacked	4 August 2015	8	(Ukraine) Oleg Valeriyovych Bezhenar	4 August 2015
Saxan	(Moldova) Vlad Goian	Mutual consent	16 September 2015	10	(Moldova) Nicolae Panu (caretaker)	16 September 2015
Sheriff	(Moldova) Lilian Popescu	Mutual consent	5 October 2015	2	(Croatia) Zoran Vulić	7 October 2015
Academia	(Ukraine) Yuriy Hroshev	Mutual consent	26 October 2015	9	(Moldova) Vlad Goian	26 October 2015
Milsami Orhei	(Moldova) Iurie Osipenco	Mutual consent	3 November 2015	7	(Moldova) Vladimir Veber (caretaker)	3 November 2015
Milsami Orhei	(Moldova) Vladimir Veber (caretaker)	End of tenure as a caretaker	16 November 2015	7	(Moldova) Iurie Osipenco	16 November 2015
Zimbru Chișinău	(Romania) Ștefan Stoica	Mutual consent	24 November 2015	3	(Portugal) Simão Freitas	24 December 2015
Zaria Bălți	(Moldova) Veaceslav Rogac	Mutual consent	12 January 2016	5	(Ukraine) Ihor Rakhayev	12 January 2016
Milsami Orhei	(Moldova) Iurie Osipenco	Mutual consent	3 February 2016	7	(Moldova) Adrian Sosnovschi	3 February 2016
FC Saxan	(Moldova) Nicolae Panu (caretaker)	End of tenure as a caretaker	8 February 2016	10	(Moldova) Oleg Fistican	8 February 2016
Zimbru Chișinău	(Portugal) Simão Freitas	Mutual consent	3 May 2016	3	(Romania) Flavius Stoican	11 May 2016

== League table ==
Pos	Team	Pld	W	D	L	GF	GA	GD	Pts	Qualification
1	Sheriff Tiraspol (C)	27	20	5	2	50	11	+39	65 (Note: According to section 10.5 of the Moldovan Football Championship Regulations, 2015-2016 Edition, an extra match was played to determine the Moldovan champions. The match was played on 29 May 2016 and was won by Sheriff Tiraspol who became league champions.)	Qualification for the Champions League second qualifying round
2	Dacia Chișinău	27	20	5	2	44	12	+32	65	Qualification for the Europa League first qualifying round (Note: Zaria Bălți qualified for the Europa League first qualifying round by winning the 2015–16 Moldovan Cup)
3	Zimbru Chișinău	27	15	4	8	42	26	+16	49	Qualification for the Europa League first qualifying round
4	Zaria Bălți	27	12	6	9	36	29	+7	42	Qualification for the Europa League first qualifying round
5	Dinamo-Auto Tiraspol	27	12	5	10	33	34	−1	41	
6	Milsami Orhei	27	10	6	11	33	23	+10	36	
7	Speranța Nisporeni	27	8	7	12	24	36	−12	31	
8	Petrocub Hîncești	27	6	3	18	21	53	−32	21 (Note: Petrocub Hîncești ahead of Academia Chișinău on head-to-head record; Petrocub–Academia 0–0, Academia–Petrocub 1–0, Petrocub–Academia 4–2.)	
9	Academia Chișinău	27	5	6	16	18	42	−24	21	
10	Saxan	27	1	5	21	10	45	−35	8	

Source: Moldovan Football Federation, UEFA, Soccerway
Rules for classification: 1) Points; 2) Play-off (only if deciding champion when two teams tied); 3) Head-to-head points; 4) Head-to-head goal difference; 5) Head-to-head away goals scored; 6) Head-to-head goals scored; 7) Goal difference; 8) Goals scored; 9) Fairplay ranking.
(C) Champions

== Gold Match ==
The gold match was played on 29 May 2016 at Zimbru Stadium. The "home" team (for administrative purposes) was determined by an additional draw held on 22 May 2016.

Team 1	Score	Team 2
Sheriff Tiraspol	1–0	Dacia Chișinău

29 May 2016	Sheriff Tiraspol	1–0	Dacia Chișinău	Chișinău
	Galešić 88'	Report		Stadium: Zimbru Stadium

== Results ==
The schedule consists of three rounds. During the first two rounds, each team plays each other once home and away for a total of 18 matches. The pairings of the third round will then be set according to the standings after the first two rounds, giving every team a third game against each opponent for a total of 27 games per team.

=== First and second round ===
Home \ Away	ACA	DAC	DIN	MIL	ZAR	SAX	SHE	SPE	ZIM	PET
Academia Chișinău		0–2	1–3	0–2	0–2	1–1	0–3	2–3	1–5	1–0
Dacia Chișinău	1–0		4–0	1–0	1–1	2–1	1–0	1–1	0–0	2–0
Dinamo-Auto Tiraspol	1–0	0–2		1–2	0–0	0–0	0–0	3–1	0–4	2–0
Milsami Orhei	0–0	0–1	0–0		3–0	4–1	0–1	5–0	0–2	2–2
Zaria Bălți	0–1	0–2	3–1	0–0		2–1	1–1	0–0	0–1	5–1
Saxan Ceadîr-Lunga	0–3	1–3	0–1	0–0	1–3		1–2	0–0	1–2	0–1
Sheriff Tiraspol	3–1	0–0	1–1	3–0	1–0	2–0		2–1	4–1	4–0
CSF Speranța	2–0	0–1	3–2	1–0	0–2	0–0	1–0		0–0	1–1
Zimbru Chișinău	0–0	3–0	1–2	2–1	3–0	4–0	1–2	0–1		3–0
CS Petrocub	0–0	1–2	2–1	1–0	0–2	1–0	0–3	0–4	1–2	

Source: Moldovan Football Federation
Legend: Blue = home team win; Yellow = draw; Red = away team win.

=== Third round ===
Home \ Away	ACA	DAC	DIN	MIL	ZAR	SAX	SHE	SPE	ZIM	PET
Academia Chișinău		0–3		1–0	0–2				0–0	
Dacia Chișinău			4–1			2–0	1–1	2–0		3–0
Dinamo-Auto Tiraspol	3–1			1–0			0–1	2–1		
Milsami Orhei		2–0			1–1				4–1	2–1
Zaria Bălți		0–1	0–2			2–0			4–2	4–2
Saxan Ceadîr-Lunga	0–3		0–1	0–1				2–0		
Sheriff Tiraspol	2–0			2–0	3–0	2–0			2–0	
CSF Speranța	0–0			0–4	1–2		1–4			
Zimbru Chișinău		0–2	2–1			1–0		1–0		1–0
CS Petrocub	4–2		1–4			2–0	0–1	0–2		

Source: Moldovan Football Federation
Legend: Blue = home team win; Yellow = draw; Red = away team win.

== Goalscoring ==
=== Top goalscorers ===
Updated to matches played on 30 May 2016.

Rank	Player	Club	Goals
1	(Switzerland) Danijel Subotić	Sheriff Tiraspol	12
2	(Moldova) Andrei Bugneac	Dinamo-Auto	11
3	(Ukraine) Serhiy Zahynaylov	Dacia Chișinău	10
3	(Moldova) Gheorghe Boghiu	Zaria	10
5	(Portugal) Rui Miguel	Zimbru Chișinău	9
6	(Moldova) Vadim Cemîrtan	Dinamo-Auto & Dacia Chișinău	7 (4 + 3)
6	(Moldova) Sergiu Istrati	FC Saxan & Academia Chișinău	7 (5 + 2)
6	(Moldova) Roman Șumchin	CS Petrocub	7
9	(Brazil) Ricardinho	Sheriff Tiraspol	6
9	(Moldova) Vladimir Ambros	CS Petrocub	6

=== Hat-tricks ===
Key
^{4}	Player scored four goals
^{5}	Player scored five goals

Player	Home	Away	Result	Date
(Portugal) Rui Miguel Rodrigues	Academia Chișinău	Zimbru Chișinău	1–5	18 September 2015
(Ukraine) Serhiy Zahynaylov	Academia Chișinău	Dacia Chișinău	0–3	4 February 2016

== Clean sheets ==
As of 30 May 2016

Rank	Player	Club	Clean sheets
1	(Moldova) Artiom Gaiduchevici	Dacia Chișinău	15
1	(Moldova) Alexei Coșelev	Sheriff Tiraspol	15
3	(Cape Verde) Vozinha	Zimbru Chișinău	12
4	(Moldova) Nicolae Țurcan	Speranța Nisporeni	11
5	(Moldova) Cristian Avram	Academia Chișinău	9
6	(Moldova) Radu Mîțu	Milsami	7
6	(Moldova) Alexandru Zveaghințev	Dinamo-Auto	7
8	(Moldova) Vladimir Livșiț	Zaria Bălți	5
8	(Moldova) Victor Buga	CS Petrocub	5

== Disciplinary ==
Rank	Player	Club	Yellow card	Double Yellow Card/Ejection	Red Card	Points
1	(Moldova) Andrei Cojocari	Milsami Orhei	8	1	0	10
2	(Moldova) Vadim Cemîrtan	Dinamo-Auto Tiraspol & Dacia Chișinău	9	0	0	9 (7 + 2)
3	(Portugal) Rui Miguel	Zimbru Chișinău	5	0	1	8
3	(Brazil) Alex Bruno	Zimbru Chișinău	6	1	0	8
5	(Moldova) Alexandru Onică	Zaria Bălți	7	0	0	7
5	(Ghana) Samuel Duah	FC Saxan	4	0	1	7
5	(Cameroon) Salif Inoua	FC Saxan	7	0	0	7
5	(Moldova) Alexandru Starîș	Zimbru Chișinău	7	0	0	7
5	(Moldova) Victor Mudrac	Dinamo-Auto Tiraspol	7	0	0	7
5	(Moldova) Roman Șumchin	CS Petrocub	7	0	0	7
5	(Ghana) Seidu Yahaya	Sheriff Tiraspol	4	0	1	7
5	(Moldova) Eugen Celeadnic	Academia Chișinău	5	1	0	7

== Attendances ==
Updated to matches played on 24 May 2016.

As of 24 May 2016

Pos	Team	Total	High	Low	Average	Change
1	Zaria Bălți	30,850	5,000	850	2,925	+265.6%
2	Sheriff Tiraspol	30,260	4,500	1,100	2,800	+70.7%
3	Milsami Orhei	22,500	3,000	600	1,800	+9.1%
4	Saxan Ceadîr-Lunga	17,600	2,500	900	1,700	−26.1%
5	Zimbru Chișinău	14,895	4,000	395	2,198	+9.9%
6	CS Petrocub	11,550	1,000	400	700	n/a
7	CSF Speranța	8,700	2,000	300	1,150	n/a
8	Dacia Chișinău	8,280	3,000	150	1,575	+350.0%
9	Academia Chișinău	3,350	500	50	275	−15.4%
10	Dinamo-Auto Tiraspol	3,230	1,000	80	540	+208.6%
	League total	150,215	5,000	50	2,525	+24.7%
