= List of FC Zimbru Chișinău managers =

This chronological list comprises all those who have held the position of manager of Zimbru Chișinău from 1947 to the present day. Interim managers are included, where known.

== Managers ==
| Name | Period |
|---|---|
| (Soviet Union) Sergei Eriomin | 1947–49 |
| (Soviet Union) Vasiliy Epishin | 1950–51 |
| (Soviet Union) Valeriy Bekhtenev | 1952 |
| (Soviet Union) Georgiy Mazanov | 1953 |
| (Soviet Union) Piotr Stupakov | 1954–56 |
| (Soviet Union) Victor Maslov | 1956 |
| (Soviet Union) Viktor Novikov | 1957 |
| (Soviet Union) Aleksandr Sevidov | 1958–60 |
| (Soviet Union) Vasily Sokolov | 1960–63 |
| (Soviet Union) Nikolai Glebov | 1964 |
| (Soviet Union) Boris Tsybin | 1965 |
| (Soviet Union) Ivan Zolotukhin | 1966 |
| (Soviet Union) Konstantin Ryazantsev | 1966–68 |
| (Soviet Union) Vladimir Țincler | 1969–70 |
| (Soviet Union) Vasily Sokolov | 1970–71 |
| (Soviet Union) Sergei Shaposhnikov | 1972 |
| (Soviet Union) Veaceslav Chiricenco | 1972 |
| (Soviet Union) Viktor Korolkov | 1973–74 |
| (Soviet Union) Anatoli Polosin | 1975–78 |
| (Soviet Union) Veaceslav Chiricenco | 1979 |
| (Soviet Union) Viktor Korolkov | 1980–81 |
| (Soviet Union) Leonid Shevchenko | 1982–83 |
| (Soviet Union) Anatol Borș | 1983–85 |
| (Soviet Union) Anatoli Polosin | 1985 |
| (Soviet Union) Vladimir Țincler | 1986 |
| (Soviet Union) Vladimir Gosperschi | 1986 |
| (Soviet Union) Vladimir Yemets | 1987 |
| (Soviet Union) Ahmad Alaskarov | 1988–89 |
| (Soviet Union) Pavel Cebanu | 1990–91 |
| (Romania) Dudu Georgescu | 1991 |

| Name | Period |
|---|---|
| (Moldova) Sergiu Sîrbu | Jan 1992–Oct 1993 |
| (Moldova) Veaceslav Chiricenco | Oct 1993–Dec 1993 |
| (Moldova) Alexandru Spiridon | Jan 1994–Aug 1996 |
| (Moldova) Ion Caras | Aug 1996–June 1997 |
| (Ukraine) Semen Altman | July 1997–Aug 1999 |
| (Ukraine) Oleksandr Skrypnyk | Aug 1999–June 2000 |
| (Moldova) Alexandru Spiridon | June 2000–May 2001 |
| (Moldova) Vladimir Veber | May 2001–Sept 2001 |
| (Moldova) Nicolai Mandrîcenco | Sept 2001–May 2002 |
| (Moldova) Sergiu Sîrbu (interim) | May 2002 |
| (Romania) Gabriel Stan | May 2002–June 2003 |
| (Moldova) Sergiu Sîrbu | June 2003–Nov 2003 |
| (Romania) Gheorghe Niculescu | Nov 2003–May 2005 |
| (Moldova) Ivan Tabanov | May 2005–Apr 2007 |
| (Moldova) Alexandru Curteian | Apr 2007–June 2007 |
| (Ukraine) Oleksandr Sevidov | June 2007–June 2008 |
| (Moldova) Ion Caras | June 2008–Apr 2009 |
| (Moldova) Ivan Tabanov | Apr 2009–May 2011 |
| (Moldova) Serghei Stroenco | May 2011–May 2012 |
| (Moldova) Oleg Bejenari | May 2012–July 2012 |
| (Moldova) Sergiu Sîrbu (interim) | July 2012–Oct 2012 |
| (Moldova) Oleg Fistican | Oct 2012–Dec 2012 |
| (Moldova) Sergiu Sîrbu (interim) | Dec 2012 |
| (Moldova) Serghei Dubrovin | Dec 2012–March 2013 |
| (Moldova) Sergiu Sîrbu (interim) | March 2013–Apr 2013 |
| (Moldova) Serghei Cleșcenco | Apr 2013–Sept 2013 |
| (Belarus) Oleg Kubarev | Sept 2013–Dec 2014 |
| (Moldova) Veaceslav Rusnac | Dec 2014–June 2015 |
| (Romania) Ștefan Stoica | June 2015–Nov 2015 |
| (Moldova) Veaceslav Rusnac (interim) | Nov 2015–Jan 2016 |

| Name | Period |
|---|---|
| (Portugal) Simão Freitas | Jan 2016–May 2016 |
| (Moldova) Denis Romanenco (interim) | May 2016 |
| (Romania) Flavius Stoican | May 2016–Sept 2016 |
| (Moldova) Veaceslav Rusnac | Sept 2016–Jan 2017 |
| (Romania) Ștefan Stoica | Feb 2017–July 2017 |
| (Moldova) Iurie Osipenco | July 2017–Dec 2017 |
| (Moldova) Vladimir Aga | Feb 2018–June 2018 |
| (Moldova) Serghei Secu | June 2018–July 2018 |
| (Romania) Sorin Colceag | Aug 2018–July 2019 |
| (Moldova) Vladimir Aga | July 2019–Oct 2019 |
| (Moldova) Veaceslav Sofroni (interim) | Nov 2019–Dec 2019 |
| (Italy) Sandro Pochesci | Dec 2019–Feb 2020 |
| (Italy) Giovanni Scanu | Feb 2020–March 2020 |
| (Moldova) Vlad Goian | June 2020–Oct 2020 |
| (Moldova) Simeon Bulgaru (interim) | Oct 2020–Jan 2021 |
| (Moldova) Vlad Goian | Jan 2021–Nov 2021 |
| (Italy) Michele Bon | Nov 2021–June 2022 |
| (Moldova) Vlad Goian | June 2022–Aug 2022 |
| (Moldova) Lilian Popescu | Aug 2022–Oct 2024 |
| (Moldova) Dumitru Arabadji (interim) | Oct 2024 |
| (Turkey) Hikmet Karaman | Oct 2024–June 2025 |
| (Belarus) Oleg Kubarev | June 2025–May 2026 |
| (Ukraine) Oleksandr Poklonskyi | June 2026 – present |

== Managers by trophies ==
| Rank | Name | League | Cup | Super cup | Total |
|---|---|---|---|---|---|
| 1 | (Moldova) Alexandru Spiridon | 3 | 0 | 0 | 3 |
| 2 | (Ukraine) Semen Altman | 2 | 1 | 0 | 3 |
| 3 | (Moldova) Sergiu Sîrbu | 2 | 0 | 0 | 2 |
| 4 | (Ukraine) Oleksandr Skrypnyk | 1 | 0 | 0 | 1 |
| 5 | (Belarus) Oleg Kubarev | 0 | 1 | 1 | 2 |
| 6 | (Moldova) Ion Caras | 0 | 1 | 0 | 1 |
| 6 | (Romania) Gabriel Stan | 0 | 1 | 0 | 1 |
| 6 | (Romania) Gheorghe Niculescu | 0 | 1 | 0 | 1 |
| 6 | (Moldova) Alexandru Curteian | 0 | 1 | 0 | 1 |
