= 2010–11 Ukrainian First League =

Ukrainian First League
- Season: 2010–11
- Champions: PFC Oleksandria
- Promoted: Chornomorets
- Relegated: Prykarpattya
- Matches played: 291
- Goals scored: 762 (2.62 per match)
- Top goalscorer: 20 – Ruslan Hunchak (Bukovyna)
- Biggest home win: Stal 5–0 Prykarpattya (Round 2); Lviv 6–1 Feniks-Illichivets (Round 18)
- Biggest away win: Feniks-Illichivets 1–6 Zirka (Round 19); Prykarpattya 1–6 Lviv (Round 34)
- Highest scoring: Lviv 6–1 Feniks-Illichivets (Round 18); Feniks-Illichivets 1–6 Zirka (Round 19); Prykarpattya 1–6 Lviv (Round 34)
- Longest winning run: 6 – Chornomorets (Rounds ppd. 15, 20–21, 23–25)
- Longest unbeaten run: 14 – Chornomorets (Rounds 11–14, 16–19, ppd. 15, 20–21, 23–25)
- Longest losing run: 7 – Prykarpattya (Round 8, 10–15)
- Highest attendance: 10,000 – Bukovyna – Chornomorets (Round 26)
- Lowest attendance: 100 – Dynamo-2 – Chornomorets (Round 8); Dynamo-2 – Tytan (Round 12); Helios – Dnister (Round 14); Arsenal – Dnister (Round 22)

The 2010–11 Ukrainian First League was the 20th since its establishment. Eighteen teams competed in the competition. Two teams were promoted from the 2009–10 Ukrainian Second League and a third team replaced a team that withdrew from the competition.

The competition began on July 17, 2010, with six matches. It had a winter break and resumed on March 19, 2011.

== Promotion and relegation ==
=== Promoted teams ===
These three teams were promoted from the 2009–10 Ukrainian Second League

Group A

- Bukovyna Chernivtsi – champion (returning after nine seasons)
- Nyva Vinnytsia – Playoff winner (returning after four seasons)

Group B

- Tytan Armyansk – champion (debut)

=== Relegated teams ===
Two teams were relegated from the 2009–10 Ukrainian Premier League

- Chornomorets Odesa – 15th place (returning after eight seasons)
- Zakarpattya Uzhhorod – 16th place (returning after a season)

== Playoff game ==
At the meeting of the Professional Football League of Ukraine, it was confirmed that FC Desna Chernihiv failed attestation for the season and hence would have their license withdrawn. To allow an extra team to be promoted, the PFL determined that a playoff game between the 2nd placed teams from Druha Liha – Kremin Kremenchuk and Nyva Vinnytsia would determine the vacancy created. This playoff game was played on June 28, 2010.

June 28, 2010
17:00 UTC+3

Kremin Kremenchuk	0–2	Nyva Vinnytsia
		Kozban 12'; Nayko 48'

Central Stadium, Makariv
Attendance: 700
Referee: Dmytro Kutakov (Brovary)
- Nyva Vinnytsia were promoted into the First League, while Kremin Kremenchuk remain in the Second League.

== Team locations ==
=== Map ===
The following displays the location of teams.

Location of teams in Ukrainian First League 2010–11

=== Stadiums ===
The following stadiums were used during the season.

Rank	Stadium	Capacity	Club	Notes
1	Central Stadium, Vinnytsia	24,000	Nyva Vinnytsia	
2	MCS Rukh, Ivano-Frankivsk	15,000	Prykarpattya Ivano-Frankivsk	
3	Zirka Stadium, Kirovohrad	13,667	Zirka Kirovohrad	
4	Labor Reserve, Bila Tserkva	13,500	Arsenal Bila Tserkva	With stadium under construction capacity is reduced to 5,000.
5	Avanhard Zakarpattya, Uzhhorod	12,000	Zakarpattya Uzhhorod	
6	Bukovyna Stadium, Chernivtsi	12,000	Bukovyna Chernivtsi	
7	Stal Stadium, Alchevsk	8,632	Stal Alchevsk	
8	KSC Nika, Oleksandria	5,692	PFC Oleksandria	
9	Naftovyk Stadium, Okhtyrka	5,256	Naftovyk-Ukrnafta Okhtyrka	
10	Spartak Stadium, Odesa	4,800	Chornomorets Odesa; Dnister Ovidiopol	Dniester loans usage of stadium in 2011 due to state of home stadium
11	Khimik Stadium, Krasnoperekopsk, Crimea	4,116	Tytan Armyansk	Used as home ground after the winter break (Note: Tytan Armyansk played their Round 21, 23 and 25 games at Khimik Stadium, Krasnoperekopsk, Crimea)
12	Khimik Stadium, Armyansk, Crimea	3,450	Tytan Armyansk	
13	Khimik Sport Complex, Vinnytsia	3,283	Nyva Vinnytsia	Used as home stadium in Round 22
14	ST Sport Arena, Ahrarne, Crimea	3,250	Krymteplitsia Molodizhne	
15	Lofort Arena, Dobromyl	3,220	FC Lviv	
16	Enerhetyk Stadium, Burshtyn	3,000	Enerhetyk Burshtyn	
16	Avanhard Stadium, Mukachevo	3,000	Zakarpattya Uzhhorod	Used as home stadium in Round 22
18	Sport Complex Obukhivsky Raion, Obukhiv, Kyiv Oblast	2,064	Arsenal Bila Tserkva	Club forced to play away from home after the winter break. (Note: Arsenal Bila Tserkva played their Round 21, 23 and 25 games at SCOR Stadium, Obukhiv, Kyiv Oblast)
19	Helios Arena, Kharkiv	2,057	Helios Kharkiv	
20	Dukov Dnister Stadium, Ovidiopol	1,500	Dnister Ovidiopol	
21	Stadium Yunist, Kalinino, Crimea	1,050	Feniks-Illichovets Kalinino	
22	Dynamo Club Stadium, Chapayevka	750	Dynamo-2 Kyiv	

== Managers ==
Club	Coach	Replaced coach
Arsenal Bila Tserkva	(Ukraine) Ihor Artymovych	
Bukovyna Chernivtsi	(Ukraine) Vadym Zayats	
Chornomorets Odesa	(Ukraine) Roman Hryhorchuk	(Ukraine) Ihor Nakonechny
Dnister Ovidiopol	(Ukraine) Andriy Parkhomenko	
Dynamo-2 Kyiv	(Ukraine) Andriy Husin	(Ukraine) Hennadiy Lytovchenko
Enerhetyk Burshtyn	(Ukraine) Bohdan Blavatskyi	(Ukraine) Mykola Prystay (Ukraine) Roman Pokora (Ukraine) Mykhailo Savka (Ukraine) Serhiy Ptashnyk
Feniks-Illichovets Kalinino	(Ukraine) Ivan Maruschak	
Helios Kharkiv	(Ukraine) Volodymyr Shekhovtsov (caretaker)	(Ukraine) Roman Pokora (Ukraine) Serhiy Kandaurov (Ukraine) Volodymyr Shekhovtsov (caretaker)
Krymteplytsia Molodizhne	(Ukraine) Mykola Fedorko (caretaker)	(Ukraine) Oleksandr Sevidov
FC Lviv	(Ukraine) Oleksandr Ryabokon	
Naftovyk-Ukrnafta Okhtyrka	(Ukraine) Serhiy Mizin	
Nyva Vinnytsia	(Ukraine) Oleh Fedorchuk	
PFC Oleksandria	(Ukraine) Volodymyr Sharan	
Prykarpattya Ivano-Frankivsk	(Ukraine) Ihor Dyriv (caretaker)	(Ukraine) Mykola Prystay (Ukraine) Serhiy Ptashnyk (Ukraine) Petro Kushlyk
Stal Alchevsk	(Ukraine) Anatoliy Volobuyev	
Tytan Armyansk	(Ukraine) Mykola Fedorenko	
Zakarpattia Uzhhorod	(Ukraine) Oleksandr Sevidov	(Russia) Igor Gamula
Zirka Kirovohrad	(Ukraine) Anatoliy Buznyk	(Ukraine) Oleksandr Deriberin

=== Managerial changes ===
Team	Outgoing head coach	Manner of departure	Date of vacancy	Table	Incoming head coach	Date of appointment
Chornomorets	(Ukraine) Andriy Bal	Sacked	13 May	Pre-season	(Ukraine) Ihor Nakonechny	13 May
Naftovyk-Ukrnafta	(Ukraine) Serhiy Shevchenko	Leaves for PFC Sevastopol	10 June	Pre-season	(Ukraine) Serhiy Mizin	27 June
FC Lviv	(Ukraine) Viktor Ryashko (caretaker)	End as caretaker	23 June	Pre-season	(Ukraine) Oleksandr Ryabokon	23 June
Zirka	(Ukraine) Ihor Zhabchenko	Contract not extended	1 July	Pre-season	(Ukraine) Oleksandr Deriberin	1 July
Enerhetyk	(Ukraine) Mykola Prystay	Resigns	1 September	17th place	(Ukraine) Roman Pokora	4 September
Helios	(Ukraine) Serhiy Kandaurov	Resigns	12 September	14th place	(Ukraine) Volodymyr Shekhovtsov (caretaker)	12 September
Helios	(Ukraine) Volodymyr Shekhovtsov (caretaker)	End as caretaker	28 September	13th place	(Ukraine) Roman Pokora	28 September
Enerhetyk	(Ukraine) Roman Pokora	Leaves for FC Helios	28 September	15th place	(Ukraine) Mykhailo Savka	28 September
Zirka	(Ukraine) Oleksandr Deriberin	Resigned	29 September	18th place	(Ukraine) Anatoliy Buznyk	29 September
Chornomorets	(Ukraine) Ihor Nakonechny	Sacked	16 November	4th place	(Ukraine) Roman Hryhorchuk	16 November
Enerhetyk	(Ukraine) Mykhailo Savka	End of contract Assistant at Chornomorets	20 November	14th place	(Ukraine) Serhiy Ptashnyk	22 December
Dynamo-2	(Ukraine) Hennadiy Lytovchenko	Other club duties	21 December	9th place	(Ukraine) Andriy Husin	21 December
Prykarpattya	(Ukraine) Serhiy Ptashnyk	Leaves for Enerhetyk	22 December	18th place	(Ukraine) Petro Kushlyk	13 January
Prykarpattya	(Ukraine) Petro Kushlyk	Other club duties	20 March	17th place	(Ukraine) Mykola Prystay	20 March
Krymteplytsia	(Ukraine) Oleksandr Sevidov	Resigns	30 March	8th place	(Ukraine) Mykola Fedorko (caretaker)	8 April
Zakarpattya	(Russia) Igor Gamula	Sacked	6 April	5th place	(Ukraine) Oleksandr Sevidov	6 April
Enerhetyk	(Ukraine) Serhiy Ptashnyk	Sacked	12 April	15th place	(Ukraine) Bohdan Blavatskyi	12 April
Prykarpattya	(Ukraine) Mykola Prystay	License expired	20 April	17th place	(Ukraine) Ihor Dyriv (caretaker)	20 April
Helios	(Ukraine) Roman Pokora	Sacked	22 April	13th place	(Ukraine) Volodymyr Shekhovtsov (caretaker)	22 April

== Final standings ==
Pos	Team	Pld	W	D	L	GF	GA	GD	Pts	Promotion or relegation
1	PFC Oleksandria (C, P)	34	21	6	7	55	25	+30	69	Promoted to Ukrainian Premier League
2	Chornomorets Odesa (P)	34	18	11	5	53	26	+27	65	Promoted to Ukrainian Premier League
3	Stal Alchevsk	34	18	8	8	55	31	+24	62	
4	Krymteplitsia Molodizhne	34	18	7	9	43	30	+13	61	
5	FC Lviv	34	17	8	9	52	28	+24	59	
6	Zakarpattia Uzhhorod	34	16	8	10	51	40	+11	56	
7	Bukovyna Chernivtsi	34	17	5	12	48	45	+3	56	
8	Dynamo-2 Kyiv	34	15	7	12	39	35	+4	52	
9	Arsenal Bila Tserkva	34	15	6	13	42	43	−1	51	
10	Nyva Vinnytsia	34	14	8	12	44	42	+2	50	
11	Tytan Armyansk	34	13	5	16	32	42	−10	44	
12	Zirka Kirovohrad	34	12	7	15	43	44	−1	43	
13	Dnister Ovidiopol	34	10	12	12	39	42	−3	42	
14	Naftovyk-Ukrnafta Okhtyrka	34	10	11	13	40	44	−4	41	
15	Helios Kharkiv	34	10	10	14	31	44	−13	40	
16	Enerhetyk Burshtyn (O)	34	10	6	18	29	49	−20	36	Qualification for relegation play-off
17	Prykarpattya Ivano-Frankivsk (R)	34	5	1	28	27	82	−55	16	Relegated to Ukrainian Second League
18	Feniks-Illichovets Kalinino (Note: Feniks-Illichovets Kalinino deducted 3 points by the PFL on February 9, 2011 due to failure of payment of league dues.) (D)	34	3	2	29	17	48	−31	8	Withdrew (expelled) from PFL (Note: Prior to the resumption of competition after the winter break the club ceased operations and withdrew from the PFL.)

Source: Professional Football League of Ukraine
Rules for classification: 1st points; 2nd goal difference; 3rd goals scored; 4th fair play
(C) Champions; (D) Disqualified; (O) Play-off winners; (P) Promoted; (R) Relegated

=== Promotion/Relegation playoff ===
The promotion/relegation playoff stage consisted of two matches. For sponsorship reasons it was named as Umbro playoffs. At match one both second placed teams of the Second League groups played each other to determine the winner. At match two the match was played between the 16th place team of the First League and the winner of another playoff game between the second placed clubs from each group of the Second League.

Team 1	Score	Team 2
FC Sumy	2–0	FC Poltava
Enerhetyk Burshtyn	2–0	FC Sumy

==== Match one ====
11 June 2011
17:00 EEST

FC Sumy	2 – 0	FC Poltava
Belmokhtar 48', 52'	Report

Illichivets-Uman Stadium, Uman
Attendance: 1,500
Referee: S.Skrypak (Kyiv)

==== Match two ====
15 June 2011
17:00 EEST

Enerhetyk Burshtyn	2–0	FC Sumy
Hordiyenko 22'; Barchuk 90+2'	Report

Illichivets-Uman Stadium, Uman
Attendance: 1,000
Referee: M.Kuzmin (Mykolaiv)

==== Playoff bracket ====
Match one			Match two
			1L	Enerhetyk Burshtyn	2
2L	FC Sumy	2	2L	FC Sumy	0
2L	FC Poltava	0

- 1L – First League
- 2L – Second League

== Withdrawn teams ==
=== Feniks-Illichovets Kalinino ===
At the end of the winter break Feniks-Illichivets Kalinino administration notified the PFL that their club was in liquidation and would withdraw from the league. All of their spring fixtures are considered technical losses. The club competed in twenty games in the League and had a record of 3 wins, 2 draws and 14 losses and 1 technical loss with 17 goals scored and 48 allowed.

== Results ==
Home \ Away	ABT	BUK	CHO	DNR	DK2	ENE	FEN	HEL	KRM	LVI	NAF	NYV	OLK	PIF	STA	TYA	HOV	ZIR
Arsenal Bila Tserkva		1–2	2–2	0–0	0–2	2–1	+:-	3–1	0–0	1–0	2–1	2–1	1–1	3–2	0–0	1–2	1–3	2–0
Bukovyna Chernivtsi	2–1		3–0	2–2	1–0	2–1	+:-	0–2	1–2	0–2	2–1	1–0	3–1	2–1	3–1	2–1	0–0	1–2
Chornomorets Odesa	1–0	3–0		1–1	3–1	4–0	+:-	3–0	4–0	1–1	2–1	0–0	0–2	2–1	1–1	4–0	1–1	0–1
Dnister Ovidiopol	0–2	2–1	1–2		0–1	2–0	+:-	1–0	0–0	1–3	1–2	1–0	1–4	2–1	2–0	0–0	4–2	4–1
Dynamo-2 Kyiv	0–1	0–1	2–0	2–0		3–1	1–1	1–0	0–1	1–0	1–0	3–1	1–1	1–0	2–1	2–1	0–1	3–0
Enerhetyk Burshtyn	0–1	1–4	1–1	0–0	2–1		1–2	1–1	1–2	0–0	1–1	1–0	1–3	0–3 (Note: PFL awarded a technical 3–0 victory to Prykarpattya Ivano-Frankivsk due to Enerhetyk Burshtyn fielding Ihor Dolotko who was suspended for the game. The original Round 22 game ended in a 1–1 draw.)	2–0	0–2	2–1	2–0
Feniks-Illichovets Kalinino	2–4	0–1	1–3	1–1	-:+	-:+		1–2	1–2	0–3	-:+	1–3	-:+	-:+	0–2	-:+	-:+	1–6
Helios Kharkiv	0–2	2–1	0–0	0–0	0–0	0–1	+:-		1–0	1–3	3–1	0–0	2–2	1–0	0–1	2–2	1–0	2–2
Krymteplytsia Molodizhne	4–1	3–1	1–1	3–1	2–1	1–0	+:-	2–1		0–1	1–1	1–1	1–0	5–1	1–2	2–1	0–0	2–0
FC Lviv	1–0	2–0	0–1	1–1	3–0	2–1	6–1	0–0	2–1		3–0	4–1	0–3	4–2	0–2	2–0	0–0	0–0
Naftovyk-Ukrnafta Okhtyrka	2–3	2–3	0–0	1–1	2–2	2–3	1–0	1–1	0–2	0–0		4–0	1–0	3–0	2–2	2–0	1–1	2–0
Nyva Vinnytsia	3–1	1–1	1–3	3–2	2–2	3–0 (Note: PFL awarded a technical 3–0 victory to Nyva Vinnytsia due to Enerhetyk Burshtyn not arriving for the Round 34 match on June 11, 2011.)	+:-	2–0	1–0	1–0	2–2		2–2	3–0	2–1	4–0	2–1	0–0
FC Oleksandriya	2–0	1–0	2–1	2–1	3–0	2–0	2–1	3–0	1–0	1–0	1–1	2–1		3–0	0–1	3–0	1–0	2–1
Prykarpattya Ivano-Frankivsk	0–2	0–1	1–5	2–2	0–2	0–3	1–2	0–2	1–2	1–6	2–0	0–1	0–3		0–3	2–1	1–3	1–0
Stal Alchevsk	3–0	4–2	1–1	1–1	2–2	3–1	3–0	4–0	1–0	0–0	0–1	1–0	1–0	5–0		0–0	3–2	2–1
Tytan Armyansk	2–1	1–0	0–1	0–3	3–0	0–1	3–0 (Note: Feniks-Illichivets Kalinino failed to play in their scheduled Round 17 match on October 23, 2010 indicating that had removed themselves from all competitions (October 21st, 2010). Four days later the club informed the PFL that their financial state had stabilized. PFL award a 3–0 technical victory to Tytan Armyansk.)	2–1	0–0	2–0	0–1	1–2	1–0	2–0	2–1		0–2	0–0
Hoverla Uzhhorod	2–2	2–2	0–1	1–0	1–1	1–0	3–0	4–2	0–2	2–3	2–1	3–0	2–1	4–2	3–2	2–0		2–0
Zirka Kirovohrad	1–0	3–3	0–1	3–1	1–0	0–0	0–2	1–3	3–0	3–0	3–0	2–1	1–1	3–2	0–1	1–3	4–0	

Updated to match(es) played on June 21, 2011. Source: PFL Persha Liha Calendar
Legend: Blue = home team win; Yellow = draw; Red = away team win.

== Top scorers ==
	Scorer	Goals (Pen.)	Team
1	(Ukraine) Ruslan Hunchak	20 (1)	Bukovyna Chernivtsi
2	(Ukraine) Matviy Bobal	15 (4)	Zakarpattia Uzhhorod
3	(Ukraine) Vyacheslav Shevchenko	14	Stal Alchevsk/PFC Oleksandria (Note: Vyacheslav Shevchenko signed with PFC Oleksandria during the winter break.)
4	(Ukraine) Oleksandr Kochura	12 (5)	Zirka Kirovohrad
5	(Ukraine) Dmytro Leonov	10	Feniks-Illichivets Kalinino/Arsenal Bila Tserkva (Note: Dmytro Leonov signed with Arsenal Bila Tserkva during the winter break after Feniks-Illichivets Kalinino released all their players when the club folded.)
5	(Ukraine) Vitaliy Havrysh	10 (1)	Stal Alchevsk
5	(Ukraine) Kostyantyn Vizyonok	10 (2)	Tytan Armyansk
5	(Ukraine) Serhiy Herasymets	10 (5)	Nyva Vinnytsia
9	(Nigeria) Charles Newuche	9 (1)	Zakarpattia Uzhhorod
9	(Ukraine) Denys Vasin	9 (1)	Chornomorets Odesa
9	(Ukraine) Anatoliy Didenko	9 (2)	Chornomorets Odesa
9	(Ukraine) Valentyn Poltavets	9 (6)	Dnister Ovidiopol

== See also ==
- 2010–11 Ukrainian Premier League
- 2010–11 Ukrainian Second League
- 2010–11 Ukrainian Cup
