= Volodymyr Sharan =

Ukrainian football midfielder (born 1971)

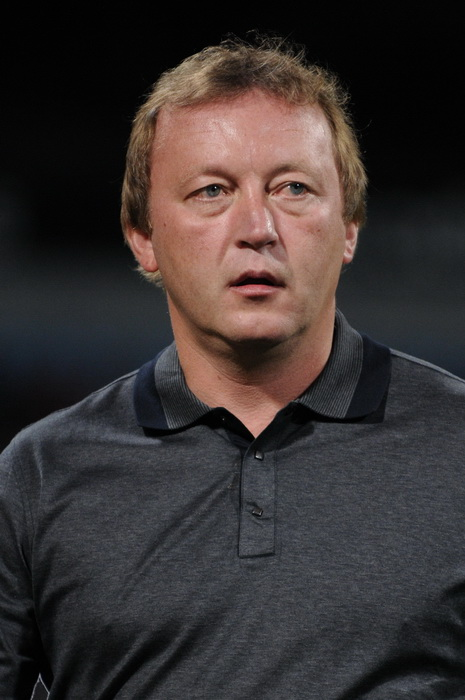

Personal information
- Full name: Volodymyr Bohdanovych Sharan
- Date of birth: 18 September 1971 (age 55)
- Place of birth: Mariiampil, Ukrainian SSR
- Height: 1.78 m (5 ft 10 in)
- Position: Midfielder

Team information
- Current team: FC Oleksandriya (manager)

Youth career
- DYuSSh Burshtyn
- OShISP Lviv

Senior career*
Years	Team	Apps	(Gls)
1989–1991	Karpaty Lviv	52	(9)
1991–1994	Dynamo Kyiv	76	(11)
1994	→ Dynamo-2 Kyiv	2	(1)
1995–1997	Dnipro Dnipropetrovsk	74	(18)
1997	→ Dnipro-2 Dnipropetrovsk	1	(1)
1998–2001	Karpaty Lviv	46	(7)
1998–2000	→ Karpaty-2 Lviv	10	(3)
1999	→ FC Lviv	1	(0)
2001–2003	Polihraftekhnika Oleksandriya	21	(1)
2003	Hirnyk Kryvyi Rih	1	(1)
Total		284	(52)

International career
1989–1990	USSR U-18		
1991	USSR U-20	4	(0)
1995	Ukraine	1	(0)

Managerial career
- 2003–2004: Kryvbas-2 Kryvyi Rih
- 2004–2005: Kryvbas Kryvyi Rih (reserves)
- 2005: Zirka Kirovohrad
- 2006–2007: Zakarpattia Uzhhorod (assistant)
- 2007–2008: Zakarpattia Uzhhorod
- 2010–2011: Oleksandriya
- 2012: Karpaty Lviv
- 2013–2021: Oleksandriya
- 2022–2023: Mynai
- 2025: Oleksandriya-2
- 2026–: Oleksandriya
Medal record
Men's football
Representing Soviet Union
FIFA World Youth Championship
Bronze medal – third place	1991 Portugal
UEFA European Under-18 Championship
Winner	1990 Hungary
- * Club domestic league appearances and goals

Volodymyr Bohdanovych Sharan (Ukrainian: Володимир Богданович Шаран; born 18 September 1971) is a Ukrainian football coach and a former midfielder who represented Ukraine once at the national level.

== Career ==
Native of a historical town Mariiampil which is on Dniester, Sharan is a product of a local sports school (DYuSSh) in Burshtyn and sports boarding school in Lviv.

=== Playing career ===
His professional career Sharan started in the revived FC Karpaty Lviv (revived in 1989) when on 29 April 1989 the Lviv team was hosting at Druzhba Stadium (Ukraina Stadium) Artsakh Stepanakert as part of the Second League Group 5 (Union republics). He came out as a substitute on the 69th minute. Karpaty won the Round 3 match 2:1.

He capped for USSR U-20 team at 1991 FIFA World Youth Championship being the only one listed on the roster as a third-tier team player. Following the tournament, in July 1991 Sharan was transferred to Dynamo Kyiv for 1 million rubles. He debuted at the Soviet Top League on 26 July 1991 during the rescheduled Round 5 home game against Spartak Moscow coming out on substitute for Andriy Annenkov already on 25th minute. That season Sharan debuted at the UEFA Champions League on 18 September 1991 in an away game against HJK Helsinki.

As a player Sharan had successful stint with Dynamo Kyiv in the 1990s winning the Ukrainian Championship three times (1993–95) as well as a Ukrainian Cup (1993).

At the winter break of 1994–95 season Sharan was transferred to FC Dnipro. During his stint in Dnipro, he participated in both Ukrainian finals.

At the winter break of 1997–98 season Sharan returned to Karpaty where he stayed until 2001. Soon after his transfer to Karpaty he became injured and had a surgery on one of his meniscuses yet returned to the club helping earn their championship bronze medals. In 1999, while on loan, he also played some games for the original FC Lviv.

At age 30 and the end of 2000–01 season, Sharan left Karpaty and joined the league's debuting club Polihraftekhnika that was coached by Roman Pokora. In 2003 playing for Oleksandriya Sharan retired from professional football after Polihraftekhnika announced its bankruptcy. Later that year he also played few games for Hirnyk out of neighboring Kryvyi Rih at regional competitions.

=== Coaching career ===
While being in Kryvyi Rih, in 2003 Sharan started his coaching career being appointed a head coach of Kryvbas-2 Kryvyi Rih and after liquidation of the team continued as a senior coach of the Kryvbas's reserves. In 2005 Sharan was appointed a head coach of FC Zirka Kirovohrad that struggled in the third tier but was soon sacked.

In 2006 Sharan joined the Petro Kushlyk's coaching staff at FC Zakarpattia Uzhhorod and the next season was appointed a manager of the Uzhhorod team. In 2008 he left the club for not receiving pay.

On 31 January 2010 Sharan was installed as manager of PFC Oleksandria of the Ukrainian First League. He was able to win the second tier competitions with the club and earn promotion returning the club back to the top flight.

On 22 December 2011 Sharan resigned from PFC Oleksandria after being offered the position of Sporting director.

On 21 January 2012 he accepted the position of manager at Karpaty Lviv. Sharan was sacked on 25 March after tying at home with Oleksandria 1:1. Karpaty under the leadership of Sharan went 0-1-3 (wins, draws, losses, respectably) with goals scored and allowed 5–12.

In 2013 Sharan returned to Oleksandriya that again was playing at the second tier. He stayed with the club until 2021 helping it again to gain promotion and earning qualification to continental competitions for the first time in the club's history.

On 23 March 2026, Sharan was appointed head coach of the FC Oleksandriya for the third time in his career.

== Honours ==
=== Club ===
Dynamo Kyiv

- Vyshcha Liha Champion: 1992–93, 1993–94
- Vyshcha Liha Runners-up: 1992
- Ukrainian Cup Champion: 1992–93

Dnipro Dnipropetrovsk

- Ukrainian Cup Runners-up: 1994–95, 1996–97

Karpaty Lviv

- Ukrainian Cup Runners-up: 1998–99

=== International ===
Soviet Union

- UEFA European Under-18 Championship champion: 1990

=== As coach ===
Oleksandriya

- Persha Liha Champion: 2010–11, 2014–15
