= 1972 in Soviet football =

Football in the Soviet Union
- Season: 1972

Men's football
- Top League: Zaria Voroshilovgrad
- First League: Pakhtakor Tashkent
- Second League: Kuzbass Kemerovo
- Soviet Cup: Torpedo Moscow

The 1972 Soviet football championship was the 40th seasons of competitive football in the Soviet Union and the 34th among teams of sports societies and factories. Zaria Voroshilovgrad won the championship becoming the Soviet domestic champions for the first time.

== Honours ==
Competition	Winner	Runner-up
Top League	Zaria Voroshilovgrad (1)	Dinamo Kiev
First League	Pakhtakor Tashkent (1)	Shakhter Donetsk
Second League	Kuzbass Kemerovo	Metallurg Lipetsk
Soviet Cup	Torpedo Moscow (5)	Spartak Moscow

Notes = Number in parentheses is the times that club has won that honour. * indicates new record for competition

== Soviet Union football championship ==
=== Top League ===
Pos	Team	Pld	W	D	L	GF	GA	GD	Pts	Qualification or relegation
1	(Ukrainian Soviet Socialist Republic) Zarya Voroshilovgrad (C)	30	15	10	5	52	30	+22	40	Qualification for European Cup first round
2	(Ukrainian Soviet Socialist Republic) Dynamo Kyiv	30	12	11	7	52	38	+14	35	Qualification for UEFA Cup first round
3	(Georgian Soviet Socialist Republic) Dinamo Tbilisi	30	12	11	7	41	34	+7	35	Qualification for UEFA Cup first round
4	(Armenian Soviet Socialist Republic) Ararat Yerevan	30	12	10	8	38	29	+9	34	
5	(Russian Soviet Federative Socialist Republic) CSKA Moscow	30	15	4	11	37	33	+4	34	
6	(Ukrainian Soviet Socialist Republic) Dnipro Dnipropetrovsk	30	12	10	8	37	37	0	34	
7	(Russian Soviet Federative Socialist Republic) Zenit Leningrad	30	11	11	8	44	30	+14	33	
8	(Byelorussian Soviet Socialist Republic) Dinamo Minsk	30	10	11	9	27	28	−1	31	
9	(Russian Soviet Federative Socialist Republic) Torpedo Moscow	30	11	9	10	31	33	−2	31	Qualification for Cup Winners' Cup first round
10	(Russian Soviet Federative Socialist Republic) Dynamo Moscow	30	12	6	12	39	35	+4	30	
11	(Russian Soviet Federative Socialist Republic) Spartak Moscow	30	8	10	12	29	30	−1	26	
12	(Russian Soviet Federative Socialist Republic) SKA Rostov-on-Don	30	8	10	12	31	35	−4	26	
13	(Kazakh Soviet Socialist Republic) Kairat Alma-Ata	30	6	14	10	23	27	−4	26	
14	(Ukrainian Soviet Socialist Republic) Karpaty Lviv	30	8	8	14	27	43	−16	24	
15	(Russian Soviet Federative Socialist Republic) Lokomotiv Moscow (R)	30	6	9	15	29	48	−19	21	Relegation to First League
16	(Azerbaijan Soviet Socialist Republic) Neftchi Baku (R)	30	6	8	16	28	55	−27	20	Relegation to First League

(C) Champions; (R) Relegated

=== First League ===
Pos	Rep	Team	Pld	W	D	L	GF	GA	GD	Pts	Promotion or relegation
1	UZB	Pahtakor Tashkent	38	24	7	7	74	36	+38	55	Promoted
2	UKR	Shakhtyor Donetsk	38	19	13	6	57	21	+36	51	Promoted
3	UKR	Chernomorets Odessa	38	20	8	10	67	36	+31	48	
4	RUS	Krylya Sovetov Kuibyshev	38	14	17	7	50	35	+15	45	
5	GEO	Torpedo Kutaisi	38	19	6	13	49	32	+17	44	
6	RUS	Zvezda Perm	38	14	16	8	41	35	+6	44	
7	RUS	Shinnik Yaroslavl	38	15	10	13	39	44	−5	40	
8	TJK	Pamir Dushanbe	38	13	13	12	52	51	+1	39	
9	RUS	Spartak Orjonikidze	38	14	10	14	49	50	−1	38	
10	KAZ	Shakhtyor Karaganda	38	11	13	14	37	48	−11	35	
11	KGZ	Alga Frunze	38	10	14	14	42	44	−2	34	
12	MDA	Nistru Kishinev (Note: Nistru Kishinev was called Moldova.)	38	11	12	15	39	49	−10	34	
13	RUS	Textilshchik Ivanovo	38	11	12	15	37	52	−15	34	
14	UKR	Metallurg Zaporozhye	38	13	7	18	45	49	−4	33	
15	RUS	Avtomobilist Nalchik	38	8	17	13	28	43	−15	33	
16	UKR	Metallist Kharkov	38	10	12	16	33	42	−9	32	
17	TKM	Stroitel Ashkhabad	38	11	10	17	36	55	−19	32	
18	RUS	UralMash Sverdlovsk	38	11	9	18	38	58	−20	31	Relegated
19	UKR	Krivbass Krivoi Rog	38	10	10	18	50	62	−12	30	Relegated
20	RUS	Dinamo Leningrad	38	7	14	17	32	53	−21	28	Relegated

Source: rsssf.com

=== Second League (finals) ===
[Nov 4-18, Sochi]

Pos	Rep	Team	Pld	W	D	L	GF	GA	GD	Pts	Promotion or qualification
1	RUS	Kuzbass Kemerovo	5	3	2	0	7	3	+4	8	Promoted
2	RUS	Metallurg Lipetsk	5	2	3	0	5	3	+2	7	Promoted
3	LVA	Daugava Riga	5	2	2	1	6	2	+4	6	Additional Play-Off
4	RUS	Amur Blagoveshchensk	5	1	1	3	4	6	−2	3	
5	RUS	Sokol Saratov	5	1	1	3	6	10	−4	3	
6	RUS	Terek Grozny	5	1	1	3	6	10	−4	3	

Source: rsssf.com
Notes:

Additional Play-Off

[Nov 22, 25]
SPARTAK Ivano-Frankovsk  0-1 3-1  Daugava Riga

=== Top goalscorers ===
Top League

- Oleg Blokhin (Dinamo Kiev) – 14 goals

First League

- Berador Abduraimov (Pakhtakor Tashkent) – 34 goals
