= Belmokhtar =

Belmokhtar is a surname. Notable people with the surname include:

- Abdelkader Belmokhtar (born 1987), Algerian cyclist
- Mokhtar Belmokhtar (1972–2016), Algerian sentenced to death for murder and terrorism
- Said Belmokhtar (born 1984), Kazakhstani-born Ukrainian footballer of Algerian descent
