= MAIB =

MAIB is an acronym which may refer to:

- Marine Accident Investigation Branch, United Kingdom
- Movement for the Self-Determination of Bioko Island (Movimiento para la Auto-determinación de la Isla de Bioko), Equatorial Guinea
- Moldova Agroindbank, Republic of Moldova
