= Prystay =

Prystay or Prystai (Ukrainian: Пристай) is a Ukrainian surname. Notable people include:

- Metro Prystai (1927–2013), Canadian ice hockey player
- Mykola Prystay (1954–2026), Ukrainian footballer and coach
