= Viktor Sakhno =

Ukrainian footballer

Personal information
- Full name: Viktor Pavlovych Sakhno
- Date of birth: 1 December 1961 (age 64)
- Place of birth: Kyiv, Ukrainian SSR
- Height: 1.82 m (5 ft 11 1/2 in)
- Position: Striker

Youth career
- FC Dynamo Kyiv

Senior career*
| Years | Team | Apps | (Gls) |
| 1978 | FC Dynamo Kyiv | 0 | (0) |
| 1979–1980 | FC Spartak Ivano-Frankivsk | 0 | (0) |
| 1980 | FC Dynamo Kyiv | 0 | (0) |
| 1981–1982 | FC Avanhard Rivne | 85 | (27) |
| 1983–1985 | FC Chornomorets Odesa | 69 | (15) |
| 1986–1989 | SKA Odesa | 143 | (58) |
| 1990–1993 | FC Olimpia Bălţi | 78 | (31) |
| 1993 | FC KAMAZ Naberezhnye Chelny | 11 | (2) |
| 1993 | FC Motor Zeulenroda | | |
| 1993 | FC Blaho Blahoyeve | | |
| 1994 | FC Podillya Khmelnytskyi | 12 | (6) |
| 1995–1996 | FC Rybak Odesa | | |
| 1997 | FC Zmina Yuzhne | | |
| 1997–1998 | FC Dnister Ovidiopol | 0 | (0) |

Managerial career
- 2000–2001: FC Lasunia Odesa
- 2001–2003: FC Chornomorets-2 Odesa (assistant)
- * Club domestic league appearances and goals

Viktor Pavlovych Sakhno (Ukrainian: Віктор Павлович Сахно; Russian: Виктор Павлович Сахно; born 1 December 1961) is a former Ukrainian professional footballer.

== Club career ==
He made his professional debut in the Soviet Second League in 1980 for FC Avanhard Rivne.
