= 2010–11 Ukrainian Second League =

Ukrainian Second League
- Season: 2010–11
- Champions: MFK Mykolaiv (Group A); Olimpik Donetsk (Group B)
- Relegated: ~~Olkom Melitopol~~ (withdrew); ~~Bastion Illichivsk~~ (withdrew); ~~Ros Bila Tserkva~~ (expelled); ~~Veres Rivne~~ (expelled)
- Matches: 252
- Goals: 669 (2.65 per match)
- Top goalscorer: 18 – Vadym Shavrin (Olimpik)
- Biggest home win: Yednist 9–0 Ros (Round 2)
- Biggest away win: Veres 0–6 Bastion (Round 9); Veres 0–6 Sumy (Round 13)
- Highest scoring: Yednist 9–0 Ros (Round 2)
- Longest winning run: 7 – Mykolaiv (Round 5–11)
- Longest unbeaten run: 11 – Poltava (Round 1–11)
- Longest losing run: 15 – Veres (Rounds 2–13, ppd. 1, 14–15)
- Highest attendance: 9,100 – Sumy – Chornomorets-2 (Round 18)
- Lowest attendance: 50 – 10 matches

The 2010–11 Ukrainian Second League was the 20th season of 3rd level professional football in Ukraine. The competitions were divided into two groups according to geographical location in the country – A is western and northern Ukraine and B is eastern and southern Ukraine.

The first game of the season was played on July 23, 2010 in Group A between Chornomorets-2 Odesa and Desna Chernihiv.

The competition had a winter break and resumed April 9, 2011 with a rescheduled match in Group B that was moved forward from its originally scheduled date of April 22, 2011.

== Competition information ==
Note: Relegation from the League is not covered by the current regulations

The placing of teams in the table is done in the following order:

- number of accumulated points
- difference(GD) between goals for(GF) and goals allowed(GA)
- number of goals for
- The League Fair-play ranking

The next tie-break is a simple draw.

== Team changes ==
=== Admitted teams ===
The following team was promoted from the 2010 Ukrainian Football Amateur League:

- Enerhiya Nova Kakhovka – first group stage participant (debut)

Also, two reserve teams were admitted:

- Chornomorets-2 Odesa – reviving (returning after an absence of six seasons)
- Dnipro-2 Dnipropetrovsk – reviving (returning after an absence of six seasons)
  - Last season FC Dnipro-75 Dnipropetrovsk was expelled from the league

Also, two teams were re-admitted:

- FC Sumy (readmitted) (Note: The reason for the readmitting the clubs is not explained, but only informed at the official website of PFL of Ukraine on July 13, 2010. On June 18, 2010 both clubs from Sumy and Chernihiv were denied their appeal to have their licenses attestation renewed, according to the Appellation Committee of Football Federation of Ukraine headed by M.Titov. The decision was recognized as final and could not have been protested any further. There is no explanation why the two clubs from Lviv clubs were excluded from the league and the reason the clubs from Eastern Ukraine were re-admitted. FC Sumy was readmitted in Group A.)
- Desna Chernihiv (readmitted)

==== Relegated teams ====
The following teams were relegated from the 2009–10 Ukrainian First League:

- Desna Chernihiv – (returning after an absence of four seasons)
- Nyva Ternopil – (returning after an absence of a season)

=== Location map ===
Locations of team home grounds in Ukrainian Second League 2010–11

== Group A ==
Pos	Team	Pld	W	D	L	GF	GA	GD	Pts	Promotion or relegation
1	MFK Mykolaiv	22	15	3	4	29	12	+17	48	Promoted to First League
2	FC Sumy	22	14	3	5	38	13	+25	45	Play-off
3	Enerhiya Nova Kakhovka	22	13	5	4	38	17	+21	44	
4	Bastion Illichivsk	22	13	4	5	38	16	+22	43	Withdrew (Note: Bastion Illichivsk completed the season but withdrew from the PFL prior to the start of the next season. (July 15, 2011))
5	Desna Chernihiv	22	12	4	6	38	24	+14	40	
6	Chornomorets-2 Odesa	22	10	6	6	27	17	+10	36	
7	Skala Stryi	22	10	5	7	26	19	+7	35	Renamed (Note: Skala Stryi renamed themselves from Skala Morshyn. (February 10, 2011))
8	Yednist' Plysky	22	10	2	10	39	26	+13	32	
9	Dynamo Khmelnytskyi	22	7	4	11	19	29	−10	22 (Note: Dynamo Khmelnytskyi, Nyva Ternopil, Ros' Bila Tserkva and Veres Rivne deducted 3 points by the PFL on February 9, 2011 due to failure of payment of league dues.)	
10	Nyva Ternopil	22	5	2	15	17	51	−34	14	
11	Ros Bila Tserkva	22	3	2	17	20	58	−38	8	Expelled (Note: Ros Bila Tserkva completed the season but had their license revoked prior to the start of next season. (July 4, 2011))
12	Veres Rivne	22	0	0	22	4	51	−47	−3	Expelled (Note: Veres Rivne were expelled from the PFL due to their financial situation. (April 29, 2011).)

=== Expelled teams ===
==== Veres Rivne ====
On April 29, 2011, after trying to find financial solvency Veres Rivne were unable to find a financial sponsor, the PFL had no alternative but to expel the club from the PFL. The club was in 12th place and had lost all of their 15 games, including a technical 3–0 loss during the season. All of their spring fixtures were considered technical losses.

=== Renamed Teams ===
==== Skala Stryi ====
After playing their home games the first half of the season in Stryi, prior to the start of the spring season Skala Morshyn changed their name to Skala Stryi.

=== Results ===
Home \ Away	BSI	CH2	DES	DKH	ENK	MYK	NVT	ROS	SKS	SUM	VER	YEP
Bastion Illichivsk		0–0	1–1	0–0	1–0	0–2	4–0	4–0	2–0	2–0	+:-	3–0
Chornomorets-2 Odesa	0–1		3–0	2–0	0–1	0–1	2–0	1–0	2–2	0–2	3–0	5–1
Desna Chernihiv	1–0	1–1		3–2	3–1	1–0	4–1	2–1	1–2	1–0	4–2	0–1
Dynamo Khmelnytskyi	0–2	1–2	1–0		1–2	0–2	2–1	6–2	0–0	0–2	+:-	1–0
Enerhiya Nova Kakhovka	3–1	2–2	2–1	4–1		1–0	4–0	1–1	1–0	0–1	4–0	2–0
MFC Mykolaiv	1–0	0–0	1–3	0–0	2–2		5–1	2–1	3–0	2–1	+:-	1–0
Nyva Ternopil	2–5	0–1	0–3	0–1	1–1	1–2		2–2	1–0	0–2	3–2	1–3
Ros Bila Tserkva	2–3	0–3	0–2	3–0	1–5	0–2	1–2		1–3	0–2	2–0	0–1
Skala Stryi	0–0	0–0	0–0	1–0	0–2	0–1	0–1	4–0		3–1	+:-	2–1
PFC Sumy	3–1	2–0	1–1	0–0	1–0	0–0	3–0	4–1	1–1		3–0	1–0
Veres Rivne	0–6	-:+	0–3 (Note: Veres Rivne failed to field their team for the game. PFL awarded a 3-0 technical victory to Desna Chernihiv who did arrive for the scheduled game.)	0–1	-:+	0–1	-:+	0–2	0–4	0–6		0–2
Yednist' Plysky	1–2	3–0	2–2	3–2	0–0	1–0	4–0	9–0	2–3	0–2	7–0	

Updated to match(es) played on June 4, 2011. Source: Premier League website (in Ukrainian)
Legend: Blue = home team win; Yellow = draw; Red = away team win.

=== Top goalscorers ===
	Scorer	Goals (Pen.)	Team
1	(Ukraine) Said Belmokhtar	12	Bastion Illichivsk/FC Sumy (Note: Said Belmokhtar signed with FC Sumy during the winter break.)
1	(Ukraine) Oleksandr Kozhemyachenko	12 (2)	Desna Chernihiv
3	(Ukraine) Yevhen Falkovskyi	9	Enerhiya Nova Kakhovka
3	(Ukraine) Bohdan Polyakhov	9	Bastion Illichivsk
3	(Ukraine) Andriy Marushchuk	9 (2)	Yednist Plysky

== Group B ==
Pos	Team	Pld	W	D	L	GF	GA	GD	Pts	Promotion or relegation
1	Olimpik Donetsk	22	17	2	3	45	15	+30	53	Promoted to First League
2	FC Poltava	22	15	3	4	41	21	+20	48	Play-off
3	Kremin Kremenchuk	22	13	4	5	37	20	+17	43	
4	Stal Dniprodzerzhynsk	22	10	7	5	32	18	+14	37	
5	Hirnyk Kryvyi Rih	22	10	5	7	32	26	+6	35	
6	Shakhtar Sverdlovsk	22	10	3	9	25	30	−5	33	
7	Shakhtar-3 Donetsk	22	8	5	9	38	37	+1	29	
8	Illichivets-2 Mariupol	22	9	0	13	20	37	−17	27	
9	Hirnyk-Sport Komsomolsk	22	6	4	12	17	29	−12	22	
10	Metalurh-2 Zaporizhzhia	22	5	4	13	18	43	−25	19	
11	Olkom Melitopol	22	5	2	15	21	22	−1	17	withdrew (Note: Olkom Melitopol withdrew from the PFL during the mid-winter break.)
12	Dnipro-2 Dnipropetrovsk	22	3	3	16	13	41	−28	9 (Note: Dnipro-2 Dnipropetrovsk deducted 3 points by the PFL on February 9, 2011 due to failure of payment of league dues.)	

=== Withdrawn teams ===
==== Olkom Melitopol ====
On 7 February Olkom Melitopol informed the PFL that they ceased their operations and withdrew from the League during the mid-winter break (after Round 13). All of their spring fixtures are considered technical losses. The club played fourteen games in the League and had a record of 5 wins, 2 draws and 7 losses with 21 goals scored and 22 allowed.

=== Results ===
Home \ Away	DD2	HIR	HIS	IL2	KRE	ME2	OLD	OLM	POL	SHS	SH3	STD
Dnipro-2 Dnipropetrovsk		0–3	0–0	1–2	0–1	1–0	0–1	1–1	1–0	0–3	2–3	1–1
Hirnyk Kryvyi Rih	3–1		0–0	4–1	0–2	1–1	0–1	+:-	0–2	2–3	2–2	0–3
Hirnyk-Sport Komsomolsk	3–1	0–4		3–0	0–3	3–0	0–2	0–3	1–2	1–0	2–0	1–1
Illichivets-2 Mariupol	3–1	0–1	1–0		1–0	0–1	2–1	+:-	2–1	0–1	2–1	0–2
Kremin Kremenchuk	4–0	2–3	1–0	2–0		4–0	2–1	3–0	4–2	0–0	1–0	1–1
Metalurh-2 Zaporizhzhia	3–1	1–2	3–2	1–0	1–1		0–2	1–2	2–4	1–2	1–1	1–2
Olimpik Donetsk	2–1	2–0	3–0	2–0	4–2	6–0		+:-	1–1	2–1	3–1	1–0
Olkom Melitopol	-:+	1–1	-:+	3–4	0–1	-:+	1–2		1–2	3–0	-:+	1–3
FC Poltava	2–1	3–2	1–0	1–0	2–1	4–0	1–0	+:-		3–0	2–2	0–3
Shakhtar Sverdlovsk	1–0	0–1	2–0	2–1	0–0	3–0	0–4	0–1	0–5		2–0	3–2
Shakhtar-3 Donetsk	3–1	1–2	1–1	6–0	5–1	2–1	1–3	4–3	0–3	2–2		3–2
Stal Dniprodzerzhynsk	2–0	1–1	1–0	3–1	0–1	0–0	2–2	0–1	0–0	2–0	1–0	

Updated to match(es) played on June 4, 2011. Source: Premier League website (in Ukrainian)
Legend: Blue = home team win; Yellow = draw; Red = away team win.

=== Top goalscorers ===
	Scorer	Goals (Pen.)	Team
1	(Ukraine) Vadym Shavrin	18 (5)	Olimpik Donetsk
2	(Ukraine) Serhiy Stepanchuk	10 (2)	Kremin Kremenchuk
3	(Ukraine) Anatoliy Pashkovskyi	9	Hirnyk Kryvyi Rih
3	(Ukraine) Kostyantyn Marchenko	9 (3)	FC Poltava
5	(Ukraine) Yevheniy Konkov	8 (1)	Metalurh-2 Zaporizhzhia
5	(Ukraine) Dmytro Hunchenko	8 (2)	Illichivets-2 Mariupol

== Promotion play-off ==
A playoff between the two second placed teams was played with the winner participating in another playoff game between the 16th placed team of the First League for a place in the 2011–12 Ukrainian First League competition.

=== First game ===
11 June 2011
17:00 EEST

FC Sumy	2 – 0	FC Poltava
Belmokhtar 48', 52'	Report

Illichivets-Uman Stadium, Uman
Attendance: 1,500
Referee: S.Skrypak (Kyiv)

=== Second game ===
15 June 2011
17:00 EEST

Enerhetyk Burshtyn	2 – 0	FC Sumy
Hordiyenko 22'; Barchuk 90+2'	Report

Illichivets-Uman Stadium, Uman
Attendance: 1,000
Referee: M. Kuzmin (Mykolaiv)

== Stadia ==
Rank	Stadium	Capacity	Club
1	Shakhtar Stadium	31,718	Shakhtar-3 Donetsk
2	RSC Olimpiyskiy	26,100	Shakhtar Sverdlovsk
3	Yuvileiny Stadium	25,800	Sumy
4	Meteor Stadium	24,381	Dnipro-2 Dnipropetrovsk
5	Stadion Trudovi Rezervy	13,500	FC Ros Bila Tserkva
6	Gagarin Stadium	12,060	Desna Chernihiv
7	City Stadium	11,700	Nyva Ternopil
8	Polytechnic Stadium	11,300	FC Kremin Kremenchuk
9	Horiushkin Memorial Stadium	10,000	FC Shakhtar Sverdlovsk
10	SC Podillya	8,000	FC Dynamo Khmelnytskyi
11	Enerhiya Stadium	6,000	Enerhiya Nova Kakhovka
12	Sokil Stadium	6,000	Morshyn Stryi
13	Naftovyk Stadium	5,265	Sumy
14	Yunist Stadium	5,000	FC Hirnyk-Sport Komsomolsk
15	Stadion Avanhard	4,500	FC Veres Rivne
16	Spartak Stadium (Odesa)	4,000	Chornomorets-2 Odesa
17	Zakhidnyi Stadium	3,206	FC Illichivets-2 Mariupol
18	Central Stadium (Makariv)	3,100	FC Ros Bila Tserkva
19	Metalurh Stadium	2,900	FC Stal Dniprodzerzhynsk
20	Zhovtneva Mine Stadium	2,500	Hirnyk Kryvyi Rih
21	Stadion Lokomotyv	2,500	FC Poltava
22	Oleksiyenko Spartak Stadium	2,000	FC Olkom Melitopol
23	Tytan Stadium	2,000	FC Metalurh-2 Zaporizhzhia
24	Azovets Stadium	1,600	Illichivets-2 Mariupol
25	Kirsha Training Center	1,500	Shakhtar-3 Donetsk
26	School Stadium	1,500	Bastion Illichivsk
27	Yednist Stadium	1,500	Yednist Plysky
28	CMS Mykolaiv	1,500	MFK Mykolaiv
29	SC Kremin	1,500	FC Kremin Kremenchuk
30	Yednist Stadium	1,050	FC Yednist' Plysky
31	Olimpik Stadium	680	FC Olimpik Donetsk
32	SC Lustdorf	500	Chornomorets-2 Odesa

== See also ==
- 2010–11 Ukrainian Premier League
- 2010–11 Ukrainian First League
- 2010–11 Ukrainian Cup
