= Petro Kushlyk =

Ukrainian football coach (born 1951)

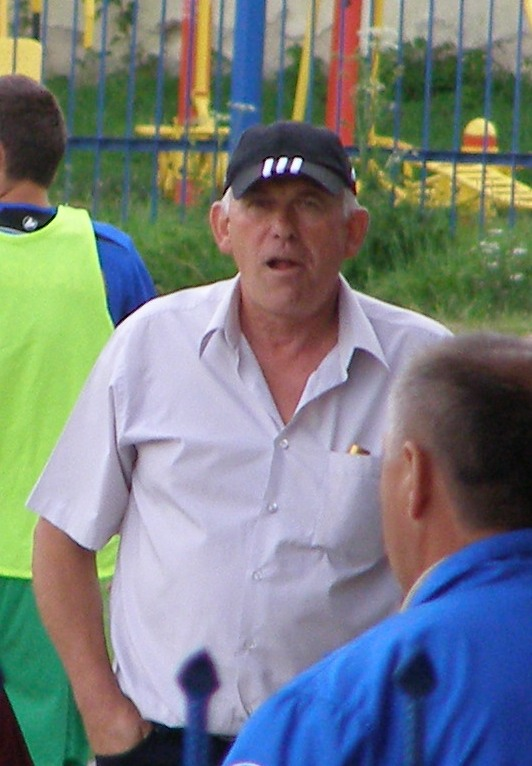
- Kushlyk in 2011

Personal information
- Full name: Petro Ivanovych Kushlyk
- Date of birth: 22 March 1951 (age 75)
- Place of birth: Kalush, Ukrainian SSR, Soviet Union
- Position: Defender

Senior career*
Years	Team	Apps	(Gls)
1971	LVVPU		
1971–1979	Spartak Ivano-Frankivsk	258	(0)

Managerial career
- 1981–1985: Prykarpattia Ivano-Frankivsk (assistant)
- 1985: Podillia Khmelnytskyi (assistant)
- 1986: Prykarpattia Ivano-Frankivsk (assistant)
- 1986–1988: Bystrytsia Nadvirna
- 1992–1994: ZKS Granat Skarżysko
- 1994–1995: Avia Świdnik
- 1996–1997: Tłoki Gorzyce
- 2000–2001: Widzew Łódź
- 2001–2005: Volyn Lutsk (assistant)
- 2005–2007: Zakarpattia Uzhhorod
- 2011: FSC Prykarpattia Ivano-Frankivsk
- 2016: Lietava Jonava (assistant)
- 2022: FK Jonava
- * Club domestic league appearances and goals

Petro Ivanovych Kushlyk (Ukrainian: Петро Іванович Кушлик, Polish: Piotr Iwanowicz Kuszłyk; born 22 March 1951) is a Ukrainian football coach and former player who played at the professional level as a defender from 1971 to 1979.

== Club career ==
Kushlyk started his football career at the amateur level, where from 1969 to 1971 he played for a football team of the Soviet Higher Military and Political Vocational School (LVVPU) in Lviv. Later that year (1971), he joined the Spartak team of masters in Ivano-Frankivsk, which played at the Soviet Second League. With Spartak, Kushlyk became the 1972 football champion of the Ukrainian SSR by winning the Ukrainian group of the Soviet Second League. For this achievement, he was awarded a sports title of the USSR Master of Sports. Besides winning its own group, Spartak received promotion to the Soviet First League by winning the play-offs against the Latvian side Daugava Riga (1972 Soviet Second League).

Also, while playing for Spartak, Kushlyk graduated from the local sports vocational school in Ivano-Frankivsk. In 1979, he retired from football. Still, he remained with the team of masters until 1982 on the team's coaching staff.

At the beginning of the 1980s, Kushlyk coached several regional teams, including Bystrytsia from Nadvirna, with which he won the regional football championship of Ivano-Frankivsk Oblast in 1986.

In 1991, Kushlyk graduated from the Higher School of Coaches in Moscow, where he studied from 1989 to 1991.

== Managerial career ==
Following the dissolution of the Soviet Union, Kushlyk managed several clubs in Poland from 1992 to 2001. In Polish media, Petro Kushlyk is known as Piotr Kuszlyk. In the summer of 2000, Kuszlyk replaced Jan Żurek as the manager of Widzew Łódź, which competed at the 2000–01 Ekstraklasa (Polish top tier).

In 2005–06 season, he managed in the Ukrainian Premier League for Zakarpattia Uzhhorod. The following season, the club was relegated to the Ukrainian First League, where he continued to manage them. Kushlyk secured a promotion for Zakarpattia by placing second in the 2006–07 Ukrainian First League. In 2011, he managed Prykarpattia Ivano-Frankivsk in the Ukrainian First League. After several months with Prykarpattia, he was dismissed from his post.

In 2022, FK Jonava hired Kushlyk as an emergency manager to rescue the club's situation in the 2022 A Lyga (Lithuanian top tier).
