= FC Prykarpattia Ivano-Frankivsk (2004) =

- Full name: Professional Football Club Prykarpattia Ivano-Frankivsk
- Nickname: Students
- Founded: 2004 (as Fakel)
- Dissolved: 2012
- Ground: MCS Rukh
- Capacity: 15,000 (24,000 planned)
- Chairman: Anatoliy Revutskyi
- Head Coach: Mykola Prystay
- League: Druha Liha
- 2010–11: 17th
Home colours	Away colours

FC Prykarpattia Ivano-Frankivsk was a professional Ukrainian football team in the Ukrainian Second League since 2004 till 2012.

== History ==
The Prykarpattia club was originally known as Fakel Ivano-Frankivsk, a Ukrainian football club based in Ivano-Frankivsk. The club was formed out of a school team of the Ivano-Frankivsk National Technical University of Oil and Gas. After gained the promotion from the Druha Liha, the club began seeking financial support knowing that the club would not be able to be viable in the Persha Liha.

On 17 July 2007, information was released to the media that FC Fakel Ivano-Frankivsk had been reformed into the FSC Prykarpattia. This reformation was to keep the historically traditional name of the team that was associated with Ivano-Frankivsk.

The initiative came from the former president of the old Prykarpattya, Anatoliy Revutskyi who together with the mayor of Ivano-Frankivsk, Viktor Anushkevichus, the president of the FC Fakel, Evstahiy Kryzhanivskyi, and Andriy Romanchuk signed the documents of the establishment of the Football Sport Club Prykarpattya. The director of the Municipal Central Stadium "Rukh" ("Movement" in English), Ivan Sliusar became the executive director of the club.

The new club's logo carries the year of the club's establishment 1989 with the name FC Prykarpattia. This implies that Spartak renamed themselves this name and continued to compete in the Ukrainian First League. A similar occurrence took place with FC LUKOR Kalush in 2003. With this reformation, FC Spartak Ivano-Frankivsk was reestablished at the Oblast championship as part of FSC Prykarpattia under the name of Prykarpattia-2 Ivano-Frankivsk.

On 29 July 2010, information was released to the media that FSC Prykarpattia had been reformed into the Professional Football Club Prykarpattia. Ivano-Frankivsk Town Council and Limited liability company "Skorzonera" (owner of tourism complex "Bukovel") are club's founders.

The club dissolved in the summer of 2012 and were expelled from the PFL when they were not included in the draw for the first round of the next season.

== Coaches ==
- (Ukraine) Serhiy Ptashnyk (2004 – July 2008) (Record 63–20–39 170:144 in Second and First League)
- (Ukraine) Stepan Matviyiv (July 2008 – November 2008)
- (Ukraine) Mykola Prystay (November 2008 – July 2009)
- (Ukraine) Serhiy Ptashnyk (July 2009 – December 2010)
- (Ukraine) Petro Kushlyk (January 2011 – March 2011)
- (Ukraine) Mykola Prystay (March 2011 – June 2011)
- (Ukraine) Petro Kushlyk (July 2011 – June 2012)
- (Ukraine) Volodymyr Kovalyuk (June 2016 – present)

== League and cup history ==
=== Fakel Ivano-Frankivsk (2004–2007) ===

Season	Div.	Pos.	Pl.	W	D	L	GS	GA	P	Domestic Cup	Europe	Notes
2004–05	3rd "A"	4	28	15	4	9	38	35	49	1/32 finals		
2005–06	3rd "A"	2	28	19	5	4	56	24	62	1/32 finals		
2006–07	3rd "A"	2	28	18	5	5	39	18	59	1/32 finals		Promoted

=== Prykarpattia Ivano-Frankivsk (2007–2012) ===
Season	Div.	Pos.	Pl.	W	D	L	GS	GA	P	Domestic Cup	Europe	Notes
2007–08	2nd	17	38	11	6	21	37	67	39	1/32 finals		Renamed (Note: Fakel Ivano-Frankivs'k, promoted from Druha Liha Hrupa A (Group A) from the 2006/07 season was actually a college based team from Ivano-Frankivs'k made a request to the City Administration of Ivano-Frankivs'k to help in funding for licensing fees and team financing. The city agreed but also brought in other financial sources of which had previous experience and involvement with the former club Prykarpattia (Folded after the 2000/01 season). Hence the club was renamed prior to the season starting.)
2008–09	2nd	16	32	7	7	18	26	54	28	1/32 finals		Reinstated (Note: Prykarpattia were to be relegated but after MFK Mykolaiv dissolved after the end of the season the PFL allowed them to remain in the Ukrainian First League for the 2008–09 season.)
2009–10	2nd	16	34	5	7	22	26	68	22	1/32 finals		
2010–11	2nd	17	34	5	1	28	27	82	16	1/16 finals		Relegated
2011–12	3rd "A"	6	26	11	6	9	40	32	36	1/32 finals		–3 (Note: Deducted 3 points due to failure of payment to former team players. (3 November 2011)) – Expelled

== See also ==
- FC Spartak Ivano-Frankivsk
- MCS Rukh
- Ivano-Frankivsk National Technical University of Oil and Gas
