= Nicolae Panu =

Moldavian footballer and manager

Personal information
- Date of birth: 18 December 1969 (age 56)
- Place of birth: Chişinău, Moldavian SSR
- Height: 1.83 m (6 ft 0 in)

Managerial career
- Years: Team
- 2015–2016: FC Saxan
- 2019: FC Yerevan (assistant)

Nicolae Panu (born 18 December 1969) is a Moldovan professional football manager and former player. He played for Codru Călărași.

He was the head coach of Moldovan football club FC Saxan from September 2015 to February 2016, and assistant manager of FC Yerevan from September to October 2019.
