= Vladimir Veber =

Russian football player and manager (1941–2026)

Personal information
- Full name: Vladimir Vladimirovich Veber (Владимир Владимирович Вебер)
- Date of birth: 20 July 1941
- Place of birth: Omsk, Russian SFSR, USSR
- Date of death: 26 February 2026 (aged 84)
- Height: 1.90 m (6 ft 3 in)
- Position: Goalkeeper

Senior career*
Years	Team	Apps	(Gls)
1960–1961	Irtysh Omsk	30	(0)
1962–1966	Moldova Chișinău	94	(0)
1967	Zirka Kirovohrad	18	(0)
1968	Kryvbas Kryvyi Rih	12	(0)
1968–1969	Dnestr Tiraspol		
1970–1971	Sakhalin Yuzhno-Sakhalinsk		
1971	Dinamo Chișinău		
1972–1973	Selkhoztekhnika Nikopol		

Managerial career
- 1974: Kolos Nikopol (assistant)
- 1977: Speranţa Drochia
- 1981: Kolos Nikopol
- 1983–1984: Nistru Chișinău (director)
- 1985: Kolos Nikopol
- 1989: Sudnobudivnyk Mykolaiv (assistant)
- 1989–1990: Politehnica Chișinău
- 1991: Tiligul-Tiras Tiraspol
- 1992: Syria Olympic
- 1992: Syria (assistant)
- 1992–1993: Al-Ittihad SC Aleppo
- 1993–1994: Raid Tripoli
- 1994–1995: Nistru Otaci
- 1995–1996: Torentul Chișinău
- 1996: Khimik Zhytomyr (caretaker)
- 1997–1998: Roma Bălți
- 1998–2001: Zimbru Chișinău (assistant)
- 2001: Zimbru Chișinău (caretaker)
- 2002–2007: Chornomorets Odesa (goalkeeping coach)
- 2007: Chornomorets-2 Odesa
- 2007–2010: Chornomorets Odesa (goalkeeping coach)
- 2010–2013: Milsami Orhei (goalkeeping coach)
- 2013: Milsami Orhei (interim?)
- 2013–2014: Milsami Orhei (goalkeeping coach)
- 2014–2026: Milsami Orhei (consultant)
- * Club domestic league appearances and goals

Vladimir Veber (Russian: Владимир Владимирович Вебер; 20 July 1941 – 26 February 2026) was a Russian football manager and footballer. He played as a goalkeeper for several teams, including Moldova Chișinău. After the end of his career he became a coach, leading several clubs and national teams of Syria and Lebanon. Later he served as coach of goalkeepers, including Moldova national team. He was a team consultant of Milsami Orhei's president.

Veber was born on 20 July 1941, and died on 26 February 2026, at the age of 84.

== Honours ==
=== Manager ===
FC Milsami

- Moldovan Cup: 2011–12
- Moldovan Super Cup: 2012

=== Individual ===
- Master of Sports of the USSR
