= Yuriy Hroshev =

Ukrainian footballer and manager

Personal information
- Full name: Yuriy Hroshev
- Date of birth: 16 May 1976 (age 50)
- Place of birth: Berdychiv, Ukrainian SSR
- Height: 1.78 m (5 ft 10 in)
- Positions: Midfielder; defender

Team information
- Current team: Florești (manager)

Senior career*
Years	Team	Apps	(Gls)
2000–2002	Hoverla Uzhhorod		
2002–2005	Nistru Otaci	23	(1)
2005–2007	Kryvbas Kryvyi Rih	19	(0)
2007–2009	Nistru Otaci	8	(0)
2009–2011	Dacia Chișinău	62	(0)
2011–2013	Sfîntul Gheorghe	21	(0)

Managerial career
- 2011–2013: Sfîntul Gheorghe
- 2013–2014: Dacia Chișinău (assistant)
- 2015: Academia Chișinău
- 2016: Nistru Otaci
- 2016–2018: Dinamo-Auto
- 2020–: Florești
- * Club domestic league appearances and goals

Yuriy Hroshev (Ukrainian: Юрій Грошев; born 16 May 1976) is a Ukrainian former footballer and current manager. He is currently the head coach of Florești. He also holds Moldovan citizenship as Iurie Groșev.
