= Oleksandr Skrypnyk (footballer) =

Ukrainian footballer

Personal information
- Full name: Oleksandr Mykolayovych Skrypnyk
- Date of birth: 7 November 1958 (age 67)
- Place of birth: Odesa, Ukrainian SSR
- Height: 1.80 m (5 ft 11 in)
- Position: Defender

Youth career
- 1975–1977: Chornomorets Odesa (reserves)

Senior career*
Years	Team	Apps	(Gls)
1978–1986	Chornomorets Odesa	160	(0)
1987	Kolos Nikopol	36	(2)
1988	Rotor Volgograd	26	(0)
1989	Krystal Kherson	14	(0)

Managerial career
- 1990–1991: Chornomorets Odesa (assistant)
- 1992: Chornomorets-2 Odesa (assistant)
- 1993–1995: Chornomorets-2 Odesa
- 1996–1999: Zimbru Chişinău (assistant)
- 1999–2000: Zimbru Chişinău
- 2000–2001: Chornomorets Odesa (assistant)
- 2001–2002: Chornomorets Odesa
- 2002–2003: Metalurh Donetsk (assistant)
- 2003–2007: Chornomorets Odesa (assistant)
- 2007: Chornomorets-2 Odesa
- 2008: Luch-Energiya Vladivostok (assistant)
- 2011: Tavriya Simferopol (assistant)
- * Club domestic league appearances and goals

Oleksandr Mykolayovych Skrypnyk (Ukrainian: Олександр Миколайович Скрипник; born 7 November 1958) is a retired Ukrainian football player and coach. He has played in different Soviet clubs.
