= Said Belmokhtar =

Ukrainian footballer

Personal information
- Full name: Said Belmokhtar
- Date of birth: 25 April 1984 (age 42)
- Place of birth: Odesa, Ukrainian SSR
- Height: 1.90 m (6 ft 3 in)
- Position: Forward

Youth career
- 1997–1999: SC Odesa
- 1999–2000: Belanov's Sport School Odesa

Senior career*
Years	Team	Apps	(Gls)
2000–2003	Chornomorets Odesa	2	(0)
2000–2003	→ Chornomorets-2 Odesa	42	(1)
2003	Palmira Odesa	9	(0)
2006	Bilyayivka	1	(0)
2007–2008	Smorgon	8	(1)
2009–2010	Bastion Illichivsk	38	(19)
2011	Sumy	8	(3)
2011–2012	Nyva Vinnytsia	11	(0)
2012	Odesa	10	(2)
2012–2013	Slavutych Cherkasy	17	(2)
2013	Krystal Kherson	7	(0)
2013–2014	Real Pharma Odesa	6	(0)
2018	FC Vorkuta		
2019	Kingsman SC	16	(8)
2021	FC Vorkuta		
- * Club domestic league appearances and goals as of 24 October 2019

Said Belmokhtar (Ukrainian: Саїд Белмохтар, born 25 April 1984) is a Ukrainian former footballer who played as a forward.

== Club career ==
=== Early career ===
Belmokhtar is the product of the FC Odesa and the Odesa Youth Sports School "Spartak" named after I. Belanov. At the professional level, he debuted in the 2000–2001 season for Chornomorets-2 in the Ukrainian Second League. He would play with the senior team in two games during the 2000–2001 season in the Ukrainian First League. He later played in the Odesa region with FC Palmira Odesa and Bilyayivka.

In 2007, he played abroad in the Belarusian Premier League with Smorgon. He played in 8 matches and recorded 1 goal with Smorgon.

=== Ukraine ===
After a season abroad, he returned to Ukraine's third division with Bastion Illichivsk during the 2009 winter transfer market. In the winter of 2010–2011, he would remain in the third tier but secured a transfer to Sumy. In his debut season with Sumy, he helped the club secure a promotion playoff berth by finishing second in the league's Group A. Belmokhtar participated in the opening round of the playoffs, where he contributed two goals against Poltava, which advanced Sumy to the final round. In the final round of the promotion playoffs, Sumy was defeated by Enerhetyk Burshtyn, which denied the club a berth in the country's second division. He also finished as the league's top scorer in Group A.

After the conclusion of the season, Belmokhtar would depart from Sumy. Initially, he was linked to a move to Odesa, but he later denied receiving any offers from the club. He would ultimately land a contract with Nyva Vinnytsia at the Ukrainian second-tier level in the summer of 2011. However, his tenure with Nyva was short-lived as he left the club two months later due to issues over player wages and playing conditions. He would appear in 11 matches for Nyva.

For the remainder of the season, he returned to his hometown to sign with Odesa. He would successfully help Odesa avoid relegation by finishing just outside the relegation zone. In his debut season with Odesa, he played in 10 matches and recorded 2 goals. Belmokhtar would later be released from his contract after the season.

Following his release from Odesa, he returned to the third division to play with Slavutych Cherkasy. After a single season in Cherkasy, his contract was terminated. In 2013, he remained in the third-tier league by securing a deal with Krystal Kherson. He would have a brief stint in Kherson as his contract was mutually terminated in August 2013. Belmokhtar would play out the remainder of the season with Real Pharma Odesa. He would appear in 6 matches for Odesa.

Once more, his tenure with Odesa was brief as he left the club in the winter of 2014. He would return to the amateur level to play with Khadzhibey Ovidiopol in 2014 and 2017.

=== Canada ===
In the summer of 2018, he played abroad for a second spell in the Southern Ontario-based Canadian Soccer League with FC Vorkuta. Belmokhtar would sign with expansion side Kingsman SC in 2019. In his debut season with Kingsman, he appeared in 16 matches and recorded 8 goals. He would also assist the expansion team in securing a playoff berth by finishing eighth in the league's first division. In the postseason, Kingsman would defeat Vorkuta to advance to the next round. In the semifinal round of the playoffs, Belmokhtar would contribute two goals against Scarborough SC, but the club would ultimately lose to the Toronto side.

He would return to his former club Vorkuta in 2021. Vorkuta would secure the regular-season title and the invitational ProSound cup. The club would also reach the championship final match, where Vorkuta was denied the title by Scarborough.

== Honors ==
FC Bastion Illichivsk

- Ukrainian Second League Golden Boot Group A: 2010–11

FC Vorkuta

- Canadian Soccer League Regular Season: 2021
- Canadian Soccer League ProSound Cup: 2021
