= Valentyn Poltavets =

Ukrainian footballer

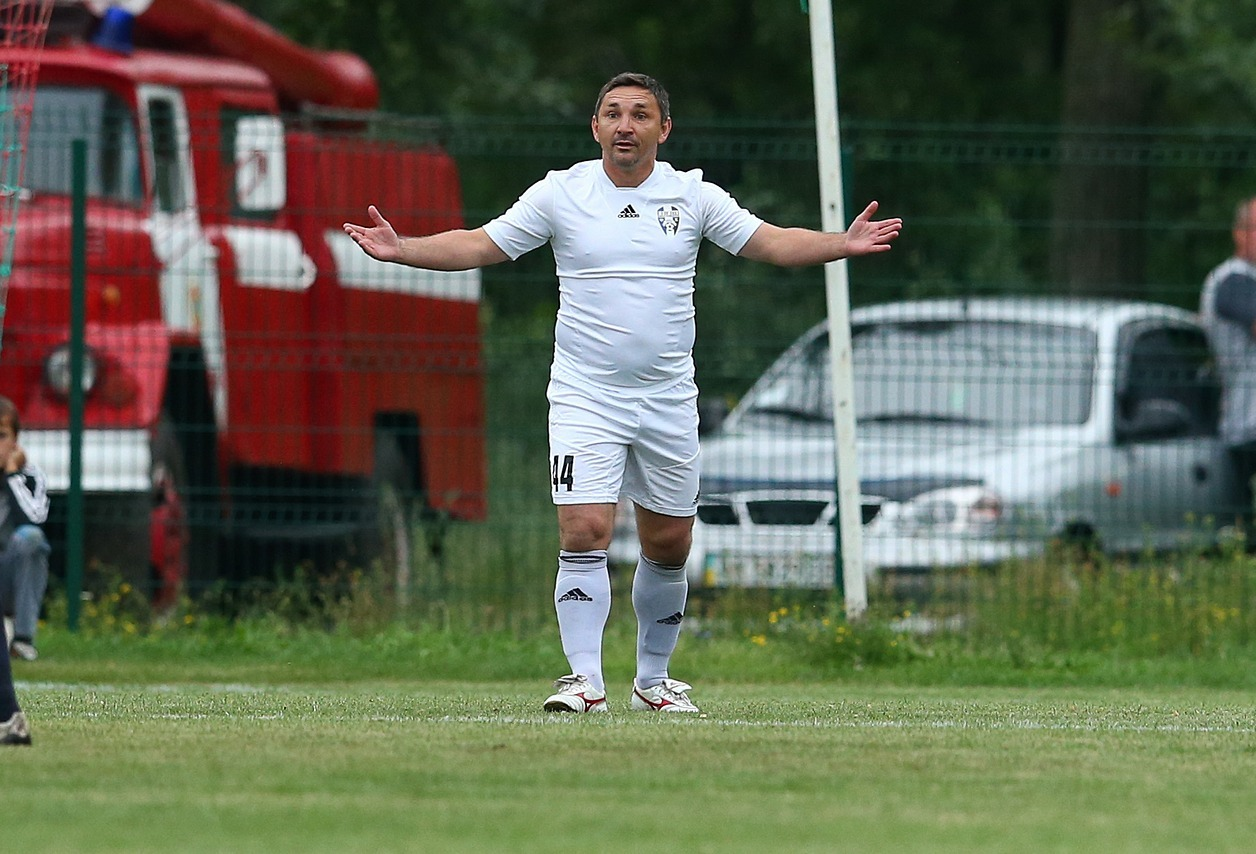

Personal information
- Full name: Valentyn Mykolayovych Poltavets
- Date of birth: 18 April 1975 (age 51)
- Place of birth: Dnipropetrovsk, Ukrainian SSR (now Ukraine)
- Height: 1.68 m (5 ft 6 in)
- Position: Midfielder

Team information
- Current team: Chornomorets-2 Odesa (head coach)

Youth career
- FC Metalurh Zaporizhzhia

Senior career*
Years	Team	Apps	(Gls)
1992–1993	FC Shakhtar Pavlohrad	14	(3)
1993–1995	FC Viktor Zaporizhzhia	33	(4)
1994–2000	FC Metalurh Zaporizhzhia	168	(47)
1998–1999	→ FC Metalurh-2 Zaporizhzhia	4	(5)
2000–2002	FC Dnipro Dnipropetrovsk	45	(10)
2001	→ FC Dnipro-2 Dnipropetrovsk	3	(0)
2002	→ FC Dnipro-3 Dnipropetrovsk	1	(0)
2002–2003	FC Arsenal Kyiv	24	(5)
2003–2004	FC Wil	15	(2)
2004–2008	FC Chornomorets Odesa	80	(20)
2008–2010	FC Dniester Ovidiopol	78	(27)
2011–2013	FC Odesa	31	(19)
2014–2016	FC Balkany Zorya	5	(0)

Managerial career
- 2015–2020: FC Balkany Zorya (assistant)
- 2024–2026: FC Real Pharma Odesa (caretaker)
- 2026–: Chornomorets-2 Odesa
- * Club domestic league appearances and goals

Valentyn Poltavets, (Ukrainian: Валентин Миколайович Полтавець, born 18 April 1975) is a Ukrainian professional football manager and former player. Besides Ukraine, he has played in Switzerland.

== Playing career ==
In the 1999–2000 season, Poltavets played for FC Metalurh Zaporizhzhia and became the top goalscorer of Ukrainian Cup 1999-00 along with Maksim Shatskikh.

== Coaching career ==
On September 23, 2024, Poltavets was hired by the FC Real Pharma Odesa to become their caretaker. He left the club in early July 2026, after it was announced that Ivan Hetsko had taken over as the club's head coach. On July 21, 2026, Poltavets was appointed head coach of the Chornomorets-2 Odesa team.

== Honours as player ==
- Swiss Cup Winner: 2003/04
- Ukrainian Premier League bronze medal (2): 2000–01, 2005–06
