= Veaceslav Rogac =

Moldovan footballer and manager

Personal information
- Full name: Veaceslav Rogac
- Date of birth: 30 March 1971 (age 55)
- Place of birth: Chișinău, Moldavian SSR

Team information
- Current team: FC Zaria Bălți (manager)

Managerial career
- Years: Team
- 2015: FC Zaria Bălți
- ‡ National team caps and goals as of 18 March 2016

Veaceslav Rogac (born 30 March 1971) is a Moldovan professional football manager and former player. Since June 2015 he has been the head coach of FC Zaria Bălți.
