= Mykola Prystay =

Soviet footballer and Ukrainian coach (1954–2026)

Personal information
- Full name: Mykola Semenovych Prystay
- Date of birth: 26 November 1954
- Place of birth: Studinka, Stanislav Oblast, Ukrainian SSR, USSR
- Date of death: 18 February 2026 (aged 71)
- Height: 1.71 m (5 ft 7 in)
- Position: Striker

Senior career*
Years	Team	Apps	(Gls)
1974	Spartak Ivano-Frankivsk	19	(1)
1975	SC Lutsk	31	(10)
1976	SKA Lviv	35	(8)
1977–1984	Prykarpattya Ivano-Frankivsk	298	(106)

Managerial career
- 1999–2001: Prykarpattia-2 Ivano-Frankivsk
- 2001: Prykarpattya Ivano-Frankivsk
- 2001–2002: LUKOR Kalush
- 2002–2003: Enerhetyk Burshtyn
- 2004–2005: Spartak Ivano-Frankivsk
- 2005–2008: Enerhetyk Burshtyn
- 2008–2009: Prykarpattya Ivano-Frankivsk
- 2009–2010: Enerhetyk Burshtyn
- 2011: Prykarpattya Ivano-Frankivsk
- 2011–2013: Naftokhimik Kalush
- * Club domestic league appearances and goals

Mykola Semenovych Prystay (Ukrainian: Микола Семенович Пристай; 26 November 1954 – 18 February 2026) was a Soviet football player and Ukrainian coach. He died on 18 February 2026, at the age of 71.
