= FC Chornomorets-2 Odesa =

Chornomorets-2
- Full name: FC Chornomorets-2 Odesa
- Nicknames: "Moryaky"("Sailors"), "Chudo"("Miracle")
- Founded: 1992, 2019, 2025
- Dissolved: 2012, 2020
- Ground: Spartak; Complex "Lyustdorf"
- Capacity: 4,800; 500
- Chairman: Valeriy Deordiev
- Head coach: Valentyn Poltavets
- League: Ukrainian Premier League-2
- 2025–26: Group B, 8th

Chornomorets-2 Odesa is football reserve team of the FC Chornomorets Odesa. It was created out of the FC Chornomorets reserves team that competed in the Soviet competition in 1992. It was dissolved (2012, 2020) and re-established (2019, 2025) twice.

== History ==
The team was allowed to enter the professional level competition and participate in the First League. In its short history, it performed under par and was taken out of the professional level competitions by 1995. In 1999, it was reformed on the base of the defunct SC Odesa.

Since the creation of the Youth and Reserves competition for the Ukrainian Premier League for 2004–05 season, the team left the Second League and entered the competition for the double teams. Upon relegation of the first squad from the Premier League after 2009–10 season, the team reentered the Second League as Chornomorets-2 Odesa.

The administration of the club decided to remove the club from the 2011–12 Ukrainian Second League during the mid season winter break indicating that there was no benefit having a third professional team. The club played sixteen games in the League and had a record of 5 wins, 5 draws and 6 losses with 19 goals scored and 20 allowed.

Since the 2025–26 season the team was re-established, and plays in the Ukrainian second league. After the season 2025–26 the team has withdrawn from the Ukrainian Second League. The team has started the 2026–27 season in the Ukrainian Premier League-2.

== Club record ==
Season	Div.	Pos.	Pl.	W	D	L	GS	GA	P	Domestic Cup	Europe	Notes
-1992	Soviet football competitions for Reserve squads											
1992	2nd B	14	26	0	4	22	14	55	5			Relegated
1992–93	3rd	16	34	8	11	15	36	43	27	Q1 round		
1993–94	3rd	11	42	16	7	19	42	55	39	Q1 round		
1994–95	3rd	21	42	6	11	25	19	48	29	Q3 round		Relegated
1995–99	Team is replaced with Dynamo Odesa, reactivated in 1999 based on SC Odesa											
1999–2000	2nd	17	34	6	5	23	25	49	23			Relegated
2000–01	3rd B	13	28	7	4	17	18	47	25	Round of 32*		
2001–02	3rd B	12	34	13	7	14	45	40	46			
2002–03	3rd B	6	30	11	13	6	42	25	46			
2003–04	3rd B	11	30	10	7	13	35	43	37			
2004–10	team transformed into Reserve squad											
2010–11	3rd A	6	22	10	6	6	27	17	36			Reactivated
2011–12	3rd A	11	16	5	5	16	19	20	20			Withdrawn
2012–	team transformed into U-19 squad											

== Coaches ==
- 1992 Vitaliy Sidnev
- 1993-1995 Oleksandr Skrypnyk
- 1999-2000 Ihor Nakonechnyi
- 2000 Valeriy Porkuyan
- 2000 Oleh Halytskyi
- 2000-2001 Ihor Nakonechnyi
- 2002 Oleksandr Spitsyn
- 2002-2003 Viktor Sakhno
- 2003 Ihor Nehara
- 2003 Oleksandr Spitsyn
- 2003-2004 Ihor Nehara
- 2010-2011 Vladyslav Zubkov
- 2025 Anatoliy Didenko
- 2026 Denys Kolchin
- 2026 – present Valentyn Poltavets

== See also ==
- FC Chornomorets Odesa
- FC Chornomorets Odesa Reserves and Youth Team
- SK Odesa
