= Simão Freitas =

Portuguese football manager

Personal information
- Full name: Simão Pedro Fernandes de Freitas
- Date of birth: 10 December 1980 (age 45)
- Place of birth: Portugal
- Height: 1.77 m (5 ft 10 in)

Youth career
- 1992–1993: Vitória de Guimarães
- 1993–1997: Vizela
- 1997–1998: Pevidém

Senior career*
Years	Team	Apps	(Gls)
1998–1999	Joane		
1999–2000	Abambres		
2001–2002	Amigos de Urgeses		

Managerial career
- 2004–2005: Beira-Mar (assistant)
- 2005–2006: Naval 1º de Maio (assistant)
- 2006–2008: Penafiel (assistant)
- 2008–2009: Boavista (assistant)
- 2009–2011: Porto (youth)
- 2011–2012: Beira-Mar (assistant)
- 2012–2015: Porto (youth)
- 2015–2016: Tondela (assistant)
- 2016: Zimbru Chișinău
- 2017–2018: Shandong Luneng (U23)
- 2019: Desportivo Brasil
- 2025–2026: Braga B
- 2026: Septemvri Sofia
- * Club domestic league appearances and goals

Simão Pedro Fernandes de Freitas (born 10 December 1980) is a Portuguese professional football manager.

== Managerial career ==
In January 2016, Freitas was appointed head coach of Moldovan club Zimbru Chișinău.
