= Iurie Osipenco =

Moldovan footballer (born 1974)

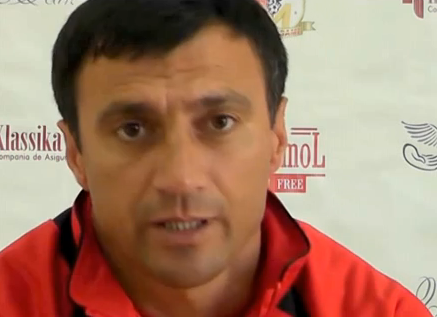
- Osipenco in 2014

Personal information
- Date of birth: 6 July 1974 (age 52)
- Place of birth: Hîncești, Moldavian SSR, Soviet Union
- Height: 1.79 m (5 ft 10 in)
- Position: Midfielder

Team information
- Current team: Moldova U15 (head coach)

Senior career*
| Years | Team | Apps | (Gls) |
| 1992–1997 | Codru Călărași | 123 | (19) |
| 1996 | → MHM-93 Chișinău (loan) | 4 | (0) |
| 1997–2001 | Constructorul Chișinău | 99 | (14) |
| 2001–2002 | Zimbru Chișinău | 25 | (4) |
| 2003 | Maccabi Kafr Kanna | | |
| 2003–2005 | Tiligul-Tiras Tiraspol | 37 | (2) |
| 2005–2006 | Okzhetpes | 48 | (5) |
| 2007 | Kairat | 9 | (0) |
| 2007–2008 | Dacia Chișinău | 15 | (3) |
| 2008–2009 | Okzhetpes | 34 | (6) |
| 2009–2010 | Iskra-Stal Rîbnița | 26 | (6) |
| 2010–2011 | Milsami Orhei | 19 | (0) |

International career
| 1998–2001 | Moldova | 13 | (0) |

Managerial career
- 2012: Rapid Ghidighici
- 2013: Moldova U19
- 2014–2016: Milsami Orhei
- 2017: Petrocub Hîncești
- 2017: Zimbru Chișinău
- 2020–2021: Speranța Nisporeni
- 2026–: Moldova U15
- * Club domestic league appearances and goals

Iurie Osipenco (born 6 July 1974) is a Moldovan football manager and former player who manages the Moldova national under-15 team.
