= Roman Pokora =

Ukrainian footballer (1948–2021)

Personal information
- Full name: Roman Mykhaylovych Pokora
- Date of birth: 22 February 1948
- Place of birth: Zboriv, Ukrainian SSR
- Date of death: 8 March 2021 (aged 73)
- Place of death: Lviv, Ukraine
- Height: 1.73 m (5 ft 8 in)
- Position: Midfielder

Senior career*
Years	Team	Apps	(Gls)
1966–1974	Karpaty Lviv	130	(12)
1975	Metalist Kharkiv	37	(4)
1977–1979	Spartak Ivano-Frankivsk	96	(19)
Total		263	(35)

Managerial career
- 1989: Zarya Bălţi
- 1989–1991: Veres Rivne
- 1992: Karpaty Lviv (asst manager)
- 1992–1994: Volyn Lutsk
- 2000–2003: Polihraftekhnika Oleksandria
- 2003–2004: SK Mykolaiv
- 2004: PFC Nyva Vinnytsia
- 2004–2005: PFC Olexandria
- 2006–2010: Simurq PIK
- 2010: Enerhetyk Burshtyn
- 2010–2011: Helios Kharkiv
- 2013: Guria Lanchkhuti
- * Club domestic league appearances and goals

Roman Mykhaylovych Pokora (Ukrainian: Роман Михайлович Покора, 22 February 1948 – 8 March 2021) was a Ukrainian football player and manager who played most of his career as a midfielder.

== Career ==
Born in Zboriv, Pokora lived in Vynnyky, a suburb of Lviv, since the age of 4.

Pokora played four seasons in the Soviet Top League for FC Karpaty Lviv.

Pokora was married and had two sons.

== Honours ==
Karpaty Lviv

- Soviet Cup: 1969
