= Oleg Fistican =

Moldovan footballer and manager

Personal information
- Date of birth: 1 February 1975 (age 51)
- Place of birth: Chișinău, Moldavian SSR, Soviet Union
- Height: 1.82 m (6 ft 0 in)
- Position: Defender

Senior career*
Years	Team	Apps	(Gls)
1992–1994	Codru Călărași	61	(0)
1994–2000	Zimbru Chișinău	96	(3)
2001–2003	Agro Chișinău	33	(0)
2003	Nistru Otaci	12	(0)
2004–2007	Okzhetpes	111	(0)
2008–2009	Iskra-Stali Rîbnița	12	(0)

International career
1995–2000	Moldova	28	(0)

Managerial career
- 2011–2012: Moldova U17
- 2012: Zimbru Chișinău
- * Club domestic league appearances and goals

Oleg Fistican (born 1 February 1975) is a Moldovan association football manager and former footballer, who played as defender.

In 1995–2000 Oleg Fistican has played 28 matches for Moldova national football team.

== Honours ==
Zimbru Chișinău

- Divizia Națională (5): 1994-1995, 1995-1996, 1997-1998, 1998-1999, 1999-2000

Runner-up: 1996-1997

Iskra-Stali

- Divizia Națională

Third place: 2008–2009
