= Oleg Bejenar =

Moldovan-Ukrainian football player and manager (1971–2023)

Personal information
- Full name: Oleh Valeriyovych Bezhenar
- Date of birth: 17 September 1971
- Place of birth: Kyiv, Ukrainian SSR, USSR
- Date of death: 13 February 2023 (aged 51)
- Place of death: Tiraspol, Moldova
- Position: Defender

Senior career*
Years	Team	Apps	(Gls)
1989	Tighina-RShVSM	1	(0)
1991	Bugeac Comrat	2	(0)
1992–1993	Tiligul Tiraspol	29	(0)
1993	Dinamo-Codru Chișinău	9	(0)
1993–1994	Tiligul Tiraspol	13	(0)
1994	Sportul Studentesc Chişinău	11	(0)
1994–1995	Bugeac Comrat	10	(0)
1995–1996	Migdal Carahasani	37	(0)
1996–1998	Dinamo Bender	16	(1)
1998–1999	Metalurh Novomoskovsk	7	(0)
1999	Arsenal Tula	0	(0)
2000	Nasaf	10	(0)
2002	Selenga Ulan-Ude	10	(0)
2003	Lokomotiv Sterlitamak		

Managerial career
- 2011: FC Academia Chișinău
- 2011–2012: Zimbru Chișinău
- 2012–2013: FC Speranța Crihana Veche
- 2015–2017: Dacia Chișinău
- 2020: FC Noah
- 2022: FC Dinamo-Auto Tiraspol
- 2022: FC Akzhayik
- * Club domestic league appearances and goals

Oleg Bejenar (Ukrainian: Олег Валерійович Беженар, transliterated: Oleh Valeriyovych Bezhenar, Russian: Олег Валерьевич Беженарь; 17 September 1971 – 13 February 2023) was a Moldovan-Ukrainian professional football manager and footballer.

Bejenar held a UEFA PRO manager licence, given by the Moldovan Football Federation.

Bejenar died from a heart attack on 13 February 2023, at the age of 51.
