= Maib =

Moldovan bank

maib
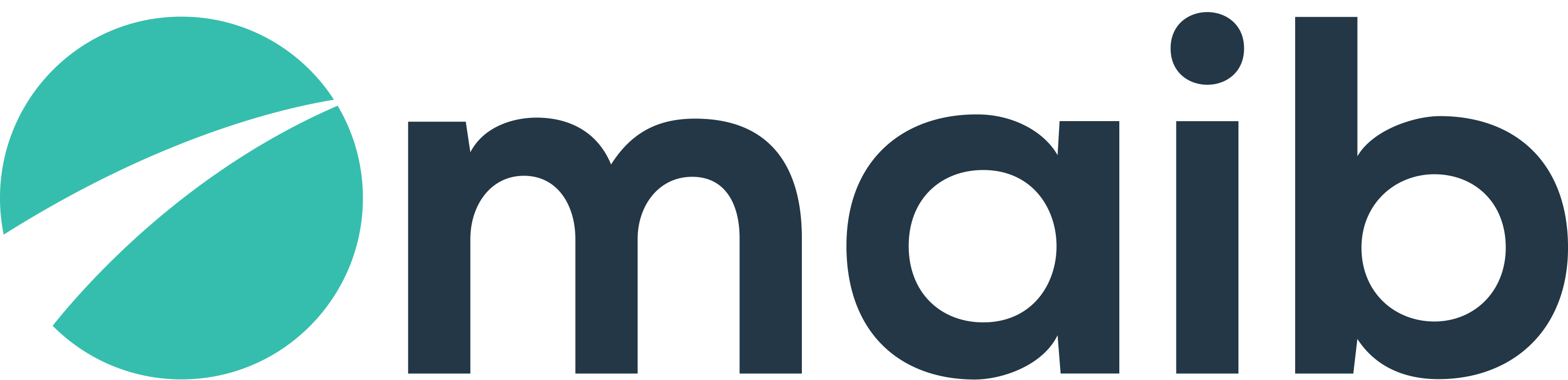
- Company type: Private (joint-stock)
- Industry: service sector
- Founded: 1991
- Headquarters: Chișinău, Republic of Moldova
- Products: Commercial banking, Investment banking, Private banking, Asset management, leasing etc.
- Revenue: 118,934,000 United States dollar (2021)
- Operating income: 51,938,000 United States dollar (2021)
- Net income: 59,115,000 United States dollar (2022)
- Number of employees: >2400 (2021)
- Website: https://www.maib.md/en

maib (BC „Moldova Agroindbank” S.A.) is Moldova’s largest commercial bank and lender.

== Background ==
MAIB started operations in 1991 as a joint-stock company by taking over assets and clients from the Soviet-era Agroprom Bank. Today MAIB is the country's largest commercial bank in terms of both total assets and total equity and is regarded as a well-managed and profitable organisation. MAIB maintains one of the largest domestic branch networks, comprising 70 branches throughout the country, covering every major population centre. The European Bank for Reconstruction and Development (EBRD) and MAIB have developed a close cooperation since 1994 under SME (small and medium-sized enterprises) and micro-lending credit lines. The Bank has a total commitment to MAIB of ECU 149 million, of which ECU 30 million is in the financial sector.
