= 1972 Soviet Second League =

Second League
- Season: 1972

1972 Soviet Second League was a Soviet competition in the Soviet Second League.

== Qualifying groups ==
=== Group I [Ukraine] ===
Pos	Team	Pld	W	D	L	GF	GA	GD	Pts	Promotion or relegation
1	Spartak Ivano-Frankivsk (C, P)	46	23	17	6	51	28	+23	63	Promoted
2	Hoverla Uzhhorod	46	25	8	13	70	44	+26	58	
3	Tavriya Simferopol	46	25	7	14	62	32	+30	57	
4	Sudnobudivnyk Mykolaiv	46	20	17	9	48	25	+23	57	
5	Shakhtar Kadiivka	46	22	11	13	61	35	+26	55	
6	Dynamo Khmelnytskyi	46	18	18	10	56	39	+17	54	
7	Lokomotyv Vinnytsia	46	19	16	11	49	36	+13	54	
8	Avtomobilist Zhytomyr	46	19	15	12	44	31	+13	53	
9	Metalurh Zhdanov	46	20	13	13	56	45	+11	53	
10	SC Chernihiv	46	19	14	13	56	41	+15	52	
11	Kolos Poltava	46	17	17	12	44	45	−1	51	
12	Shakhtar Makiivka	46	16	18	12	47	40	+7	50	
13	Avanhard Sevastopol	46	15	17	14	33	31	+2	47	
14	Zirka Kirovohrad	46	13	18	15	40	51	−11	44	
15	Budivelnyk Ternopil	46	14	15	17	50	55	−5	43	
16	Khimik Severodonetsk	46	15	13	18	37	49	−12	43	
17	Shakhtar Horlivka	46	9	22	15	43	44	−1	40	
18	Avanhard Rovno	46	13	14	19	41	52	−11	40	
19	Frunzenets Sumy	46	16	8	22	36	51	−15	40	
20	Lokomotyv Kherson	46	15	7	24	55	82	−27	37	
21	Bukovyna Chernivtsi	46	10	16	20	32	62	−30	36	
22	SC Lutsk	46	8	17	21	30	52	−22	33	
23	Lokomotyv Donetsk	46	8	13	25	32	71	−39	29	
24	Mayak Kharkiv	46	2	11	33	15	47	−32	15	Relegated

(C) Champions; (P) Promoted

=== Group II [Soviet Northwest] ===
[3-1-0 point system]

Pos	Rep	Team	Pld	W	D	L	GF	GA	GD	Pts
1	LVA	Daugava Riga	38	22	10	6	52	21	+31	76
2	RUS	Electron Novgorod	38	21	12	5	53	28	+25	75
3	RUS	Volga Kalinin	38	21	10	7	58	26	+32	73
4	RUS	Lokomotiv Kaluga	38	18	12	8	49	27	+22	66
5	LTU	Žalgiris Vilnius	38	16	13	9	44	34	+10	61
6	BLR	Spartak Brest	38	14	15	9	44	32	+12	57
7	RUS	Mashinostroitel Pskov	38	15	12	11	36	33	+3	57
8	RUS	Sever Murmansk	38	15	10	13	32	30	+2	55
9	RUS	Iskra Smolensk	38	15	9	14	37	36	+1	54
10	BLR	GomSelMash Gomel	38	15	9	14	39	45	−6	54
11	RUS	Baltika Kaliningrad	38	12	13	13	44	38	+6	49
12	RUS	Metallurg Tula	38	12	10	16	48	52	−4	46
13	LVA	Zvejnieks Liepaja	38	11	13	14	29	42	−13	46
14	RUS	Dinamo Kirov	38	11	13	14	37	47	−10	46
15	BLR	Dvina Vitebsk	38	12	8	18	31	35	−4	44
16	LTU	Atlantas Klaipeda	38	11	11	16	32	54	−22	44
17	BLR	Spartak Mogilyov	38	9	13	16	25	47	−22	40
18	BLR	Neman Grodno	38	10	10	18	24	45	−21	40
19	RUS	Spartak Petrozavodsk	38	6	10	22	23	58	−35	28
20	RUS	Stroitel Syktyvkar (W)	38	4	7	27	15	22	−7	19

(W) Withdrawn

=== Group III [Russia and Georgia] ===
Pos	Rep	Team	Pld	W	D	L	GF	GA	GD	Pts
1	RUS	Metallurg Lipetsk	36	22	10	4	66	31	+35	54
2	RUS	Kuban Krasnodar	36	19	10	7	58	24	+34	48
3	RUS	Trud Voronezh	36	18	10	8	53	29	+24	46
4	GEO	Mertskhali Makharadze	36	19	8	9	47	34	+13	46
5	GEO	Dinamo Batumi	36	14	15	7	52	39	+13	43
6	MDA	Zvezda Tiraspol	36	15	9	12	33	26	+7	39
7	RUS	Druzhba Maykop	36	14	10	12	39	31	+8	38
8	RUS	Dinamo Bryansk	36	16	6	14	47	48	−1	38
9	RUS	Mashinostroitel Podolsk	36	14	9	13	35	34	+1	37
10	RUS	Salyut Belgorod	36	12	12	12	35	37	−2	36
11	GEO	Kolkhida Poti	36	13	9	14	37	42	−5	35
12	GEO	Dila Gori	36	12	11	13	35	41	−6	35
13	GEO	Guria Lanchkhuti	36	12	7	17	46	49	−3	31
14	RUS	Kalitva Belaya Kalitva	36	10	9	17	39	48	−9	29
15	RUS	Khimik Novomoskovsk	36	9	11	16	33	47	−14	29
16	GEO	Dinamo Sukhumi	36	7	15	14	35	51	−16	29
17	GEO	Metallurg Rustavi	36	8	9	19	31	48	−17	25
18	RUS	Spartak Oryol	36	6	11	19	29	52	−23	23
19	RUS	Trudoviye Rezervy Kursk	36	9	5	22	33	72	−39	23

=== Group IV [Russian South and Caucasus] ===
Pos	Rep	Team	Pld	W	D	L	GF	GA	GD	Pts
1	RUS	Terek Grozny	36	21	9	6	62	27	+35	51
2	AZE	Dinamo Kirovabad	36	19	8	9	44	29	+15	46
3	RUS	Volga Gorkiy	36	19	7	10	57	27	+30	45
4	ARM	Shirak Leninakan	36	16	10	10	46	31	+15	42
5	RUS	Mashuk Pyatigorsk	36	18	6	12	54	42	+12	42
6	RUS	Barrikady Volgograd (Note: Stal Volgograd changed name to Barrikady.)	36	15	12	9	45	35	+10	42
7	RUS	Uralan Elista	36	15	8	13	39	38	+1	38
8	RUS	Khimik Dzerzhinsk	36	14	9	13	47	37	+10	37
9	RUS	Motor Vladimir	36	11	15	10	45	44	+1	37
10	RUS	Dinamo Stavropol	36	15	6	15	48	44	+4	36
11	RUS	Spartak Ryazan	36	14	7	15	36	45	−9	35
12	RUS	Dinamo Makhachkala	36	13	8	15	42	41	+1	34
13	RUS	Revtrud Tambov (Note: Spartak Tambov changed name to Revtrud.)	36	12	10	14	37	43	−6	34
14	RUS	Spartak Kostroma	36	12	10	14	41	53	−12	34
15	RUS	Volgar Astrakhan	36	10	10	16	29	39	−10	30
16	ARM	Lori Kirovakan	36	11	7	18	43	57	−14	29
17	RUS	Saturn Rybinsk	36	11	6	19	28	44	−16	28
18	RUS	Dinamo Vologda	36	7	12	17	29	57	−28	26
19	AZE	Karabakh Stepanakert	36	5	8	23	21	60	−39	18

=== Group V [Volga and Soviet Turkestan] ===
Pos	Rep	Team	Pld	W	D	L	GF	GA	GD	Pts
1	RUS	Sokol Saratov	32	19	9	4	56	21	+35	47
2	UZB	Neftyanik Fergana	32	15	10	7	37	26	+11	40
3	UZB	Yangiyer	32	15	10	7	32	23	+9	40
4	RUS	Kord Balakovo	32	13	12	7	37	25	+12	38
5	UZB	Avtomobilist Termez	32	16	4	12	39	29	+10	36
6	UZB	Yangiaryk	32	11	14	7	21	18	+3	36
7	RUS	Rubin Kazan	32	11	14	7	24	22	+2	36
8	RUS	Torpedo Togliatti	32	13	9	10	32	27	+5	35
9	RUS	Zenit Izhevsk	32	14	6	12	28	32	−4	34
10	RUS	Sura Penza (Note: Khimmashevets Penza changed name to Sura.)	32	12	8	12	23	33	−10	32
11	RUS	Spartak Yoshkar-Ola	32	14	2	16	23	31	−8	30
12	RUS	Energiya Cheboksary	32	11	6	15	25	38	−13	28
13	UZB	Zarafshan Navoi	32	10	6	16	33	40	−7	26
14	RUS	Volga Ulyanovsk	32	9	8	15	19	34	−15	26
15	RUS	Lokomotiv Orenburg	32	6	6	20	23	53	−30	18
16	RUS	Elektrosvet Saransk (Note: Spartak Saransk changed name to Elektrosvet.) (W)	32	4	10	18	22	30	−8	0
17	KGZ	Alay Osh (W)	32	7	10	15	28	38	−10	0

(W) Withdrew

=== Group VI (Siberia and Kazakhstan) ===
[3-1-0 point system]

Pos	Rep	Team	Pld	W	D	L	GF	GA	GD	Pts
1	RUS	Kuzbass Kemerovo	36	23	9	4	80	30	+50	78
2	RUS	Irtysh Omsk	36	22	8	6	47	22	+25	74
3	KAZ	Spartak Semipalatinsk	36	22	5	9	45	27	+18	71
4	KAZ	Dinamo Tselinograd	36	18	8	10	47	32	+15	62
5	RUS	Dinamo Barnaul	36	17	6	13	45	32	+13	57
6	RUS	Uralets Nizhniy Tagil	36	16	7	13	46	33	+13	55
7	RUS	TomLes Tomsk	36	14	13	9	33	23	+10	55
8	KAZ	Alatau Jambul	36	14	13	9	42	36	+6	55
9	KAZ	Yenbek Jezkazgan	36	16	7	13	47	45	+2	55
10	KAZ	Avtomobilist Kzil-Orda	36	13	14	9	32	26	+6	53
11	KAZ	Vostok Ust-Kamenogorsk	36	15	7	14	40	36	+4	52
12	RUS	Lokomotiv Chelyabinsk	36	13	11	12	36	40	−4	50
13	RUS	Metallurg Magnitogorsk	36	12	8	16	40	39	+1	44
14	RUS	Neftyanik Tyumen	36	11	4	21	32	47	−15	37
15	RUS	Shakhtyor Prokopyevsk	36	9	9	18	31	42	−11	36
16	RUS	Stroitel Ufa	36	8	11	17	28	43	−15	35
17	KAZ	Metallurg Chimkent	36	7	7	22	20	65	−45	28
18	RUS	Zauralets Kurgan	36	6	9	21	19	59	−40	27
19	RUS	Chkalovets Novosibirsk (Note: Dzerzhinets Novosibirsk changed name to Chkalovets.)	36	4	8	24	20	53	−33	20

Source: rsssf.com

=== Group VII (Far East) ===
Pos	Team	Pld	W	D	L	GF	GA	GD	Pts
1	Amur Blagoveshchensk	40	26	7	7	53	22	+31	59
2	Sakhalin Yuzhno-Sakhalinsk	40	23	8	9	61	39	+22	54
3	Start Angarsk	40	20	6	14	47	35	+12	46
4	Sibiryak Bratsk	40	16	11	13	39	33	+6	43
5	Avtomobilist Krasnoyarsk	40	15	10	15	53	43	+10	40
6	SKA Chita	40	11	15	14	39	52	−13	37
7	SKA Khabarovsk	40	13	10	17	45	44	+1	36
8	Vulkan Petropavlovsk-Kamchatskiy	40	12	12	16	30	41	−11	36
9	Selenga Ulan-Ude	40	11	10	19	33	47	−14	32
10	Luch Vladivostok	40	8	14	18	24	44	−20	30
11	Aeroflot Irkutsk	40	8	11	21	27	51	−24	27

Source: rsssf.com

== Promotion playoffs ==
=== Final Group ===
[Nov 4-18, Sochi]

Pos	Rep	Team	Pld	W	D	L	GF	GA	GD	Pts	Promotion or qualification
1	RUS	Kuzbass Kemerovo	5	3	2	0	7	3	+4	8	Promoted
2	RUS	Metallurg Lipetsk	5	2	3	0	5	3	+2	7	Promoted
3	LVA	Daugava Riga	5	2	2	1	6	2	+4	6	Additional play-off
4	RUS	Amur Blagoveshchensk	5	1	1	3	4	6	−2	3	
5	RUS	Sokol Saratov	5	1	1	3	6	10	−4	3	
6	RUS	Terek Grozny	5	1	1	3	6	10	−4	3	

Source: rsssf.com

=== Additional play-off ===
[Nov 22, 25]
SPARTAK Ivano-Frankovsk  0-1 3-1  Daugava Riga
