= Dănceni =

- Commune and village
- An aerial view of Dănceni from the south west.

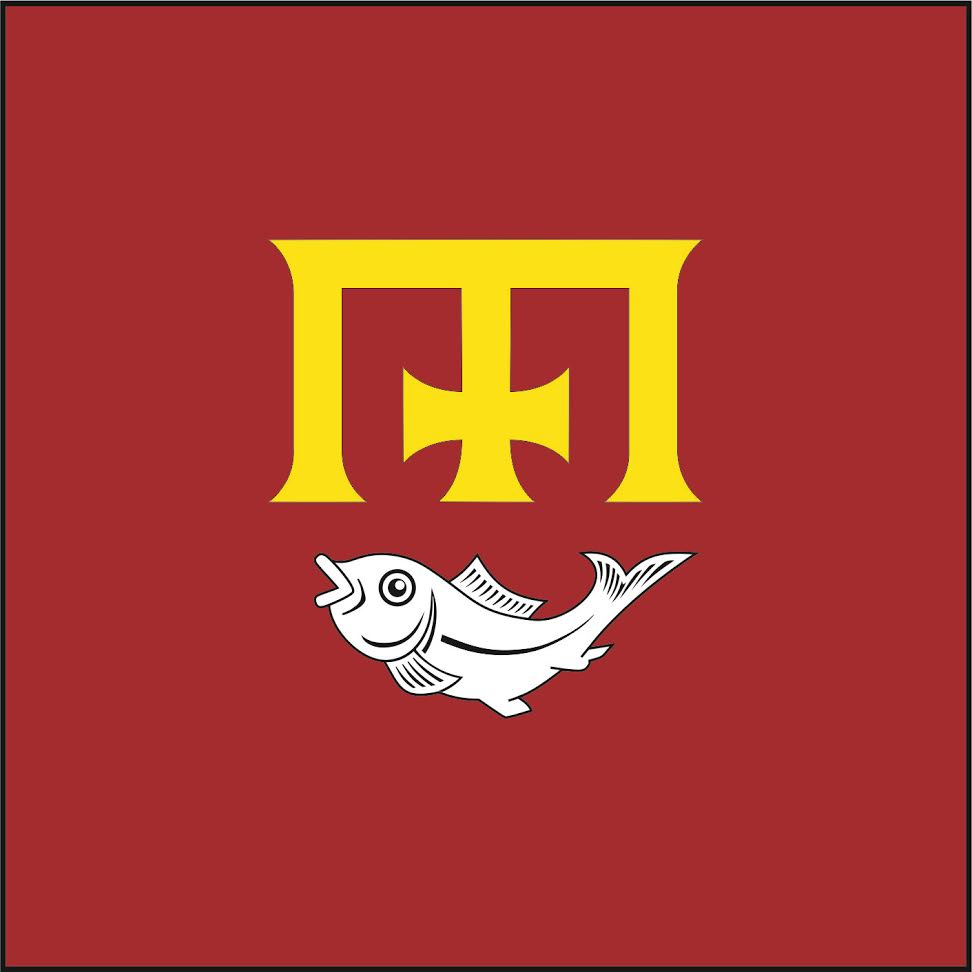
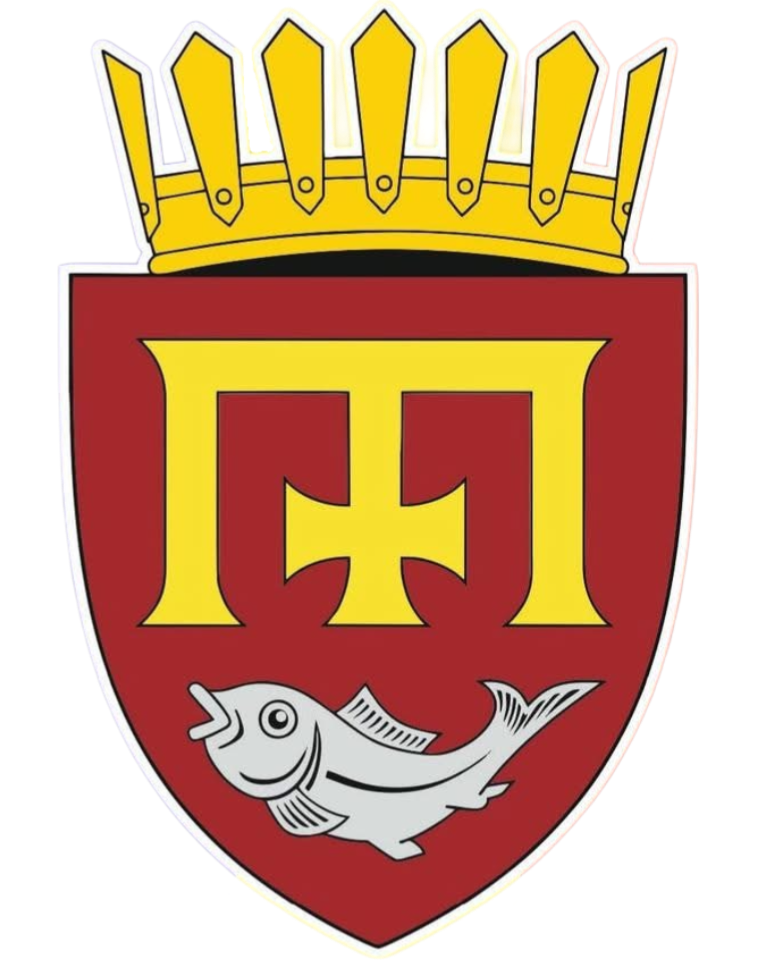
- Flag Coat of arms

- Location in Moldova
- Coordinates: 46°58′N 28°42′E
- Country: Moldova
- District: Ialoveni District
- First written mention: 16 April 1617

Government
  - Type: Mayor-council government
  - Mayor: Victoria Butuc-Guranda (PAS)

Area
  - Total: 1.93 km^{2} (0.75 sq mi)
- Elevation: 142 m (466 ft)

Population (2014 census)
  - Total: 2,406
  - Density: 1,250/km^{2} (3,230/sq mi)
- Time zone: UTC+2 (EET)
  - Summer (DST): UTC+3 (EEST)
- Postal code: MD-6814
- Area code: +373 268-34
- Website: danceni.localitate.md

Dănceni (Romanian pronunciation: [dənˈt͡ʃenʲ]) is a village in Ialoveni District, Moldova. It is located on a hillside on the bank of a large accumulation reservoir called Lake Danceni, in the Ișnovăț river valley. The village of Dănceni is located 11 km from the capital of the Republic of Moldova, Chișinau, in the southwest direction. It borders the Suruceni, Chișinău, Ialoveni, Sociteni and Ruseștii Noi localities. A major road, the Hîncești highway, passes through the south, and there is a 'rutieră' minibus route that connects Dănceni with Suruceni and Chișinău.

In the village, there is the "Alexandrina Rusu" school, the "Albinuța" kindergarten, the "Andrei Vartic" public library, a medical center, fish farms, a forestry industry, and a poultry farm. Up the hill, there is a summer stage functioning as a public space for meetings and concerts. There is also a cemetery, and a church called "Saint Demetrius", Romanian: Sfântul Dumitru.

== History and etymology ==
The name of the locality comes from the name of the boyar Danciu Ureche, whose estate would have been located at this particular place. The name 'Danciu' can be thought of as derived from the names 'Daniel', 'Dan', or from '-dan' as in the names 'Bogdan' and 'Iordan'. Danciu himself has ties to the Ureche family of Moldavia; Grigore Ureche being the most well known member.

The first documented mention of the locality is the act of 16 April 1617 (7125). It is a document issued by the prince Radu Mihnea, confirming and granting property rights to the boyar Ureche, specifically to his rightful estates, purchases, and princely donations. The document lists various villages and estates across Moldova and Bucovina, emphasizing Ureche’s ownership of these lands. Among the listed properties is the village of "Dancini" on the Ișnovăț River.

"1617, April 16.
Adecă al nostru credincios cinstit boiarin, dumnealui Ureche marile vornic m-am milostivit domnia me cu o asabită a noastră milă dumnezească, am dat și am întărit a lui dripte ocine și moșii, cumpărături și danii domnești, toate satile care are în țara domniei mele și de moșie de cumpărături și de danie dintr-a lui dripte drese mărturii ci-au avut dela alții domni mai dinainte [...] și satul Dancini pe Ișnovăț și partea lui din satul Culii din Ișnovăț..."

— "Ispisoc" from Radu Mihnea

The coat of arms and flag were approved for use in 2013, and are based on the boyar Ureche's original family emblem.

In 1974-1978, in the western part of the village, a necropolis was discovered, which contained about 300 tombs from the 3rd and 4th centuries AD, fine ceramic vessels, Roman amphorae, bronze and silver fibulae, and other objects. In 1980, on the eastern edge of the village of Dănceni, a settlement with cultural layers from the Neolithic period (5th millennium BC) and the early Middle Ages (5th-7th centuries AD) was discovered. It was found that the "Dănceni II" necropolis is among the largest burial sites known in the Republic of Moldova, where 405 human burials were discovered, the largest part belonging to the Roman period, being attributed to the culture Sântana Mureș-Cerneahov from the 3rd and 4th centuries. The only known exclusively female inhumation site from the entire north-western Black Sea region is located in the town, and is dated to around the 6th and 7th centuries.

According to a deed from 1777, the estate of Dănceni was given by the voivode Grigore Alexandru Ghică to Foma Dimache. According to the census of 1772-1773, the village of Dănceni, owned by various boyars, was part of the Botna estate, Orhei-Lăpuşna county. At the beginning of the 19th century, the owner became the landowner Casian Suruceanu, who also owned estates in Mileștii, Negrești, Pojăreni, Rusești, Suruceni.

In 1915, in the midst of World War I, Dănceni had 788 inhabitants, all of Romanian origin. In 1923, the mayor of the commune was Ștefan Corduneanu. During World War II, the town, like all the localities of the republic, suffered greatly. About 120 men were mobilized and sent to the front, of whom 43 villagers lost their lives.

The economy of Dănceni, in the second half of the 20th century, went through a series of changes when being incorporated into the newly formed MSSR during and after the war ended. In 1947, a collective farm, or kolkhoz, called "Stalin" was formed, with the agreement and cooperation of 28 households, to boost agricultural production in the region. In the 60s and 70s, the collective farm in the village became part of the "Vierul" sovkhoz, or state farm, and a factory in Suruceni. Between 1970 and 1989, the "Dănceni" stud farm and dairy farm operated in the town, and on the edges, which also included the village of Sociteni. These farms became famous for the quality of produce and output, within the republic and beyond its borders.

There was a wooden church in the village, built in 1806, and in its place in 1878, the landowner Suruceanu erected a new stone church, which was demolished in the 1960s. On November 8, 1998, the new "St. Dumitru" church was inaugurated, the benefactors being Alexandru and Alexandrina Rusu.

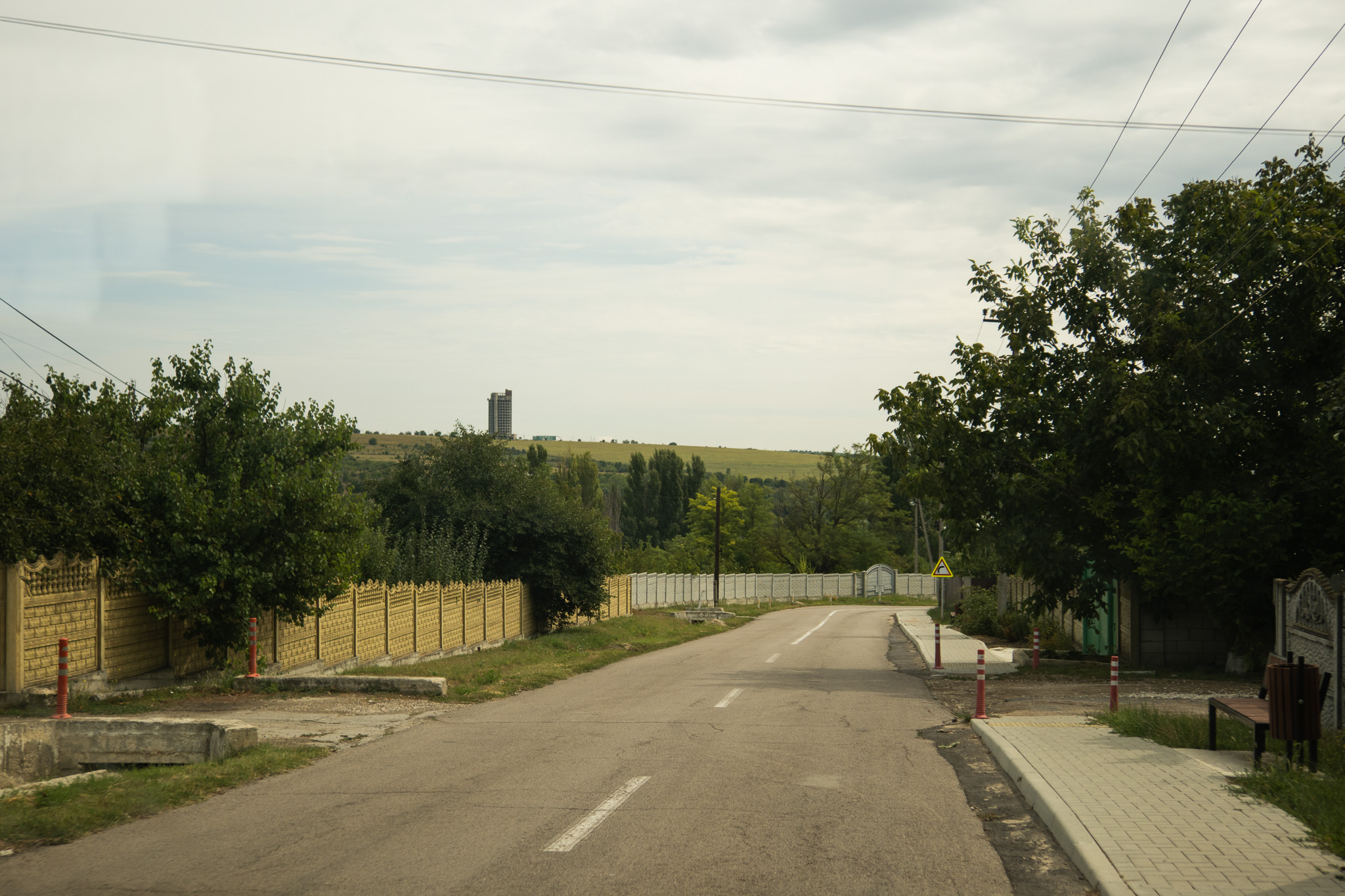
View on the main street exiting the village. Note the abandoned tower in the background.

The first elementary school in Dănceni was opened in 1894, and was located at the center of the old village, which is now the northern lakeside area of Dănceni. In the year 1988, the construction of the new "Alexandrina Rusu" school, was completed, with 1989 being the first year of the school's operation. It provides education from 1st to 9th grades.

Satellite timelapse of Dănceni from 1966 to 2022.

A large lake had existed next to the village for hundreds of years, as even in 1777 there was a mention of 'The Great Lake of Dănceni'. The retention basin now present in the valley was a project carried out by the Soviet planners, starting in the 60s and finishing in the early 80s, for purposes such as curbing flooding issues, creating a large water source for improved collective farming, and for experimental fish farming. Due to a steady increase in population over the decades, small canals and rectangular ponds existed on the Ișnovăț river floodplain, which acted as irrigation for agriculture, and to take advantage of the low, flat landscape. The plan for the new village, where the majority of the population now live, was drawn up in 1975, as the final stage began with the rapid increase of the lake's volume. People living on the shrinking banks of the now filling river valley were the first to be gradually relocated from the old village, to a higher elevation. They were given construction supplies and plots of land by the Soviet government. By the end of 1982, most residents had relocated from the old town, and the remaining houses began to be demolished or abandoned. The present day configuration of the locality had taken shape by the end of the 80s, with the layout and asphalting of most roads, and the opening of the kindergarten and school. This was the period of the largest population increase.

In 1980, the Olympic flame was carried through many villages in Moldova on its way to Moscow for the Summer Olympics, and it passed by Dănceni on what is now known as "Olympic Street", Romanian: "Strada Olimpicilor". The renamed street was widened, straightened and asphalted beforehand to accommodate for this purpose. 368 Moldovan athletes carried the torch at some point on their way to Moscow.

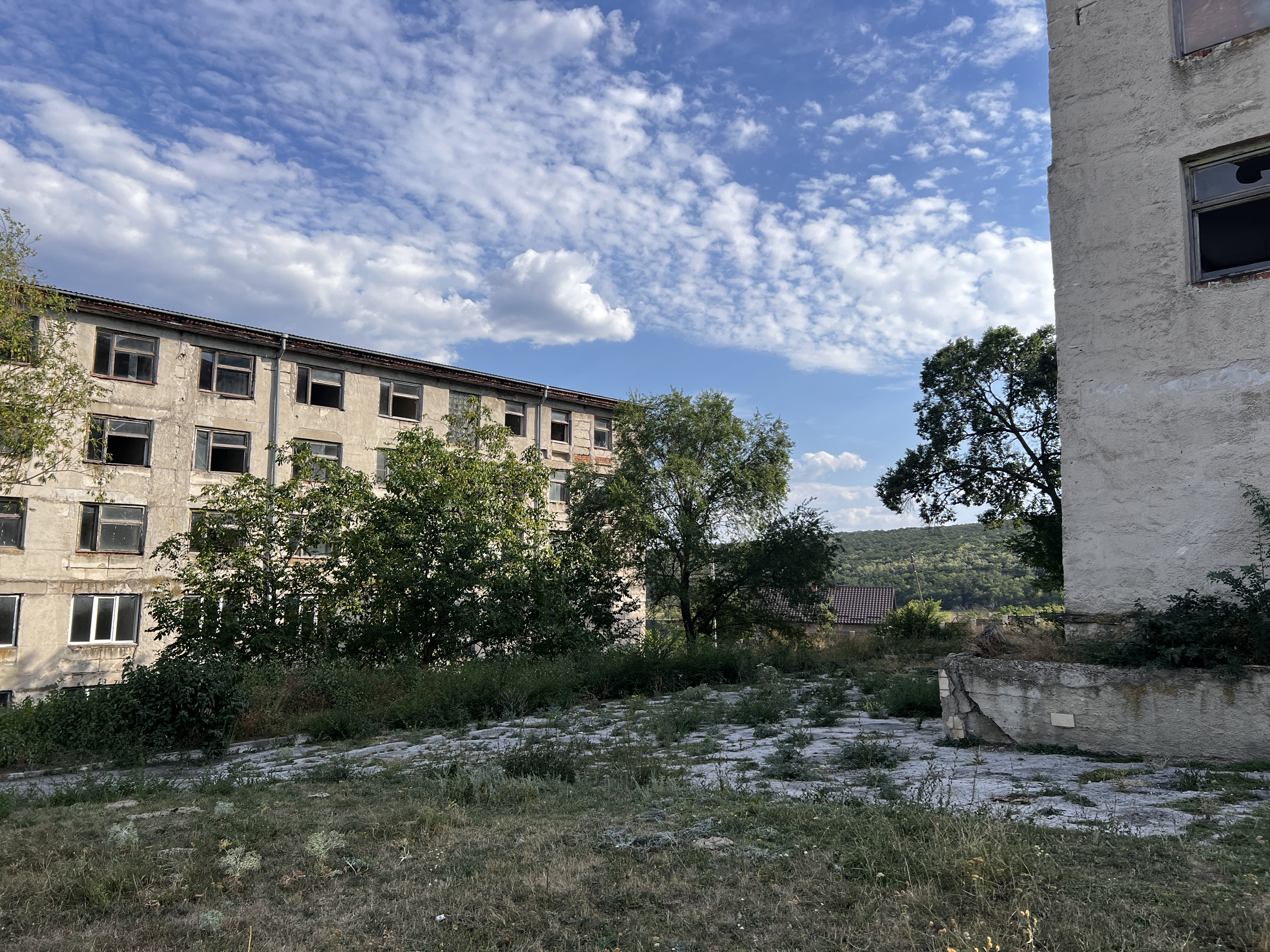
Abandoned dormitory buildings.

In the late 1980s, a Soviet plan to construct a headquarters for vinicultural purposes was carried out. However, this 75 m building with 16 floors was unfinished and now stands as a decaying concrete structure on the hill opposite Dănceni, near Ialoveni. There is a high risk of collapse, and the building has an inclination of several degrees. Despite this danger, visits are frequent by urbexers. It is frequently used by rope jumpers, but was also previously used as a place to train firefighters.

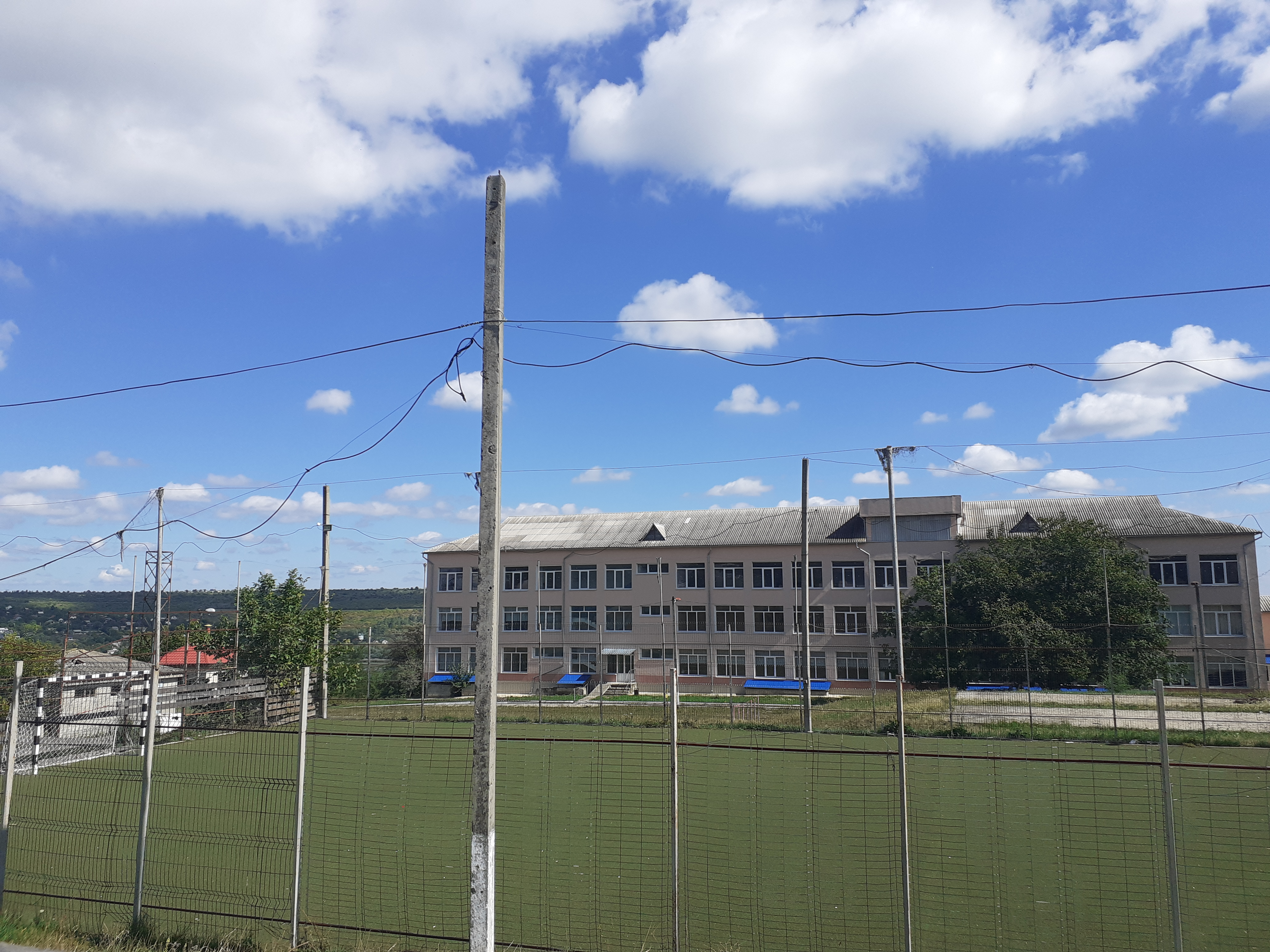
"Alexandrina Rusu" school in Dănceni.

The first buildings to be constructed on the hill were the student accommodation buildings, part of the vocational academic area constructed by the state which, while once active, became unused after the fall of the Soviet Union, and stand abandoned and dilapidated to this day, with the exception of one building still in use. The collapse of the USSR began an era of substantial stagnation in construction in this region, and many plans simply never came to fruition due to missing funds as a result of devastating shock therapy and austerity measures. This massive change also brought increased unemployment, poverty, and crime, especially violent house burglaries and theft. Birth rates and school enrollment fell while emigration increased, in particular from the 2000s onward. As part of the privatization process due to independence and market liberalization, between 1989 and 1993, the state farm was completely destroyed and abandoned, including the complex irrigation system, accelerated in part because of capitalist corruption, political bribery and business scandals. Only the many fragmented, private plots of land given to people remained by the late 90s, despite initial opposition to this land reform. On the eastern side of the lake in the late 1980s, dachas were being built as part of a fruit growing collective neighbourhood and summer retreat, which were later sold and became private residential houses by the present day, regardless of any infrastructure built to support this development.

During the Transnistria War, in 1992, the "Alexandrina Rusu" school was used as a shelter for 420 refugees from the village of Cocieri.

In recent years, the town has received much funding in the form of conditional grants and loans from the EU for many construction and infrastructure projects, including the renewal of roads, sidewalk building, and general refurbishment of the locality. In 2021, a new water purification center was constructed, and the sewage system for Dănceni was extended and upgraded after many years of inactivity in construction, with potable water reaching pipes in 2024. A summer stage was inaugurated in 2025 at the intersection of Trandafirilor and 27 August streets, with funding from a Romanian government grant. A playground by the summer stage was opened in 2026, with the help of donations from the local community and diaspora.

== Geography ==
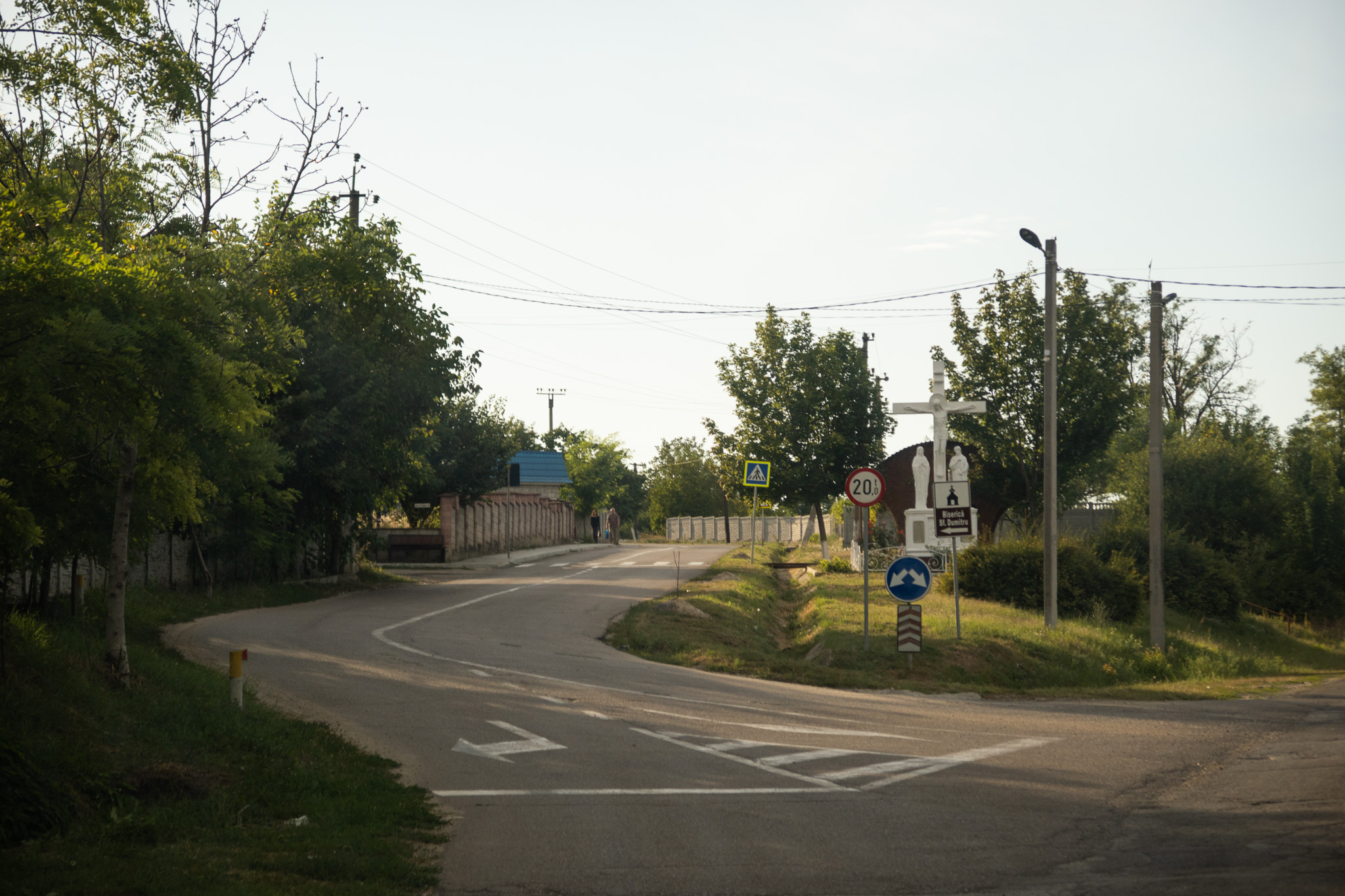
Start of the main road 'Strada 27 August'

Dănceni is located on the bank of the accumulation reservoir, Lake Dănceni, which is located in the Ișnovăț river valley. The lake has a capacity of 4 million m^{3} and a surface area of 2.2 km^{2}. Its maximum depth is about 11 meters. In more recent years, the lake has regressed somewhat, especially during droughts or drier seasons, with the most northern part of it being affected the most and being taken over by many reeds, and tall grasses. These reeds were subject to arson in May 2024, as pelicans which usually stop to feed at the lake on their yearly migrations were proving difficult to the fishermen. An unauthorized and informal landfill site on the western edge of Dănceni grew in size in the 2000s, and there are concerns the plastic pollution is causing toxic chemicals to leach into the ground and water sources that feed into the lake. In 2009, there was a large worry that a NATO scheme from 2002 to dispose of rocket fuel from a military unit near the town had contaminated the ground and created an ecological disaster, through the pouring of 50 tonnes of mélange in a cleared area of forest.

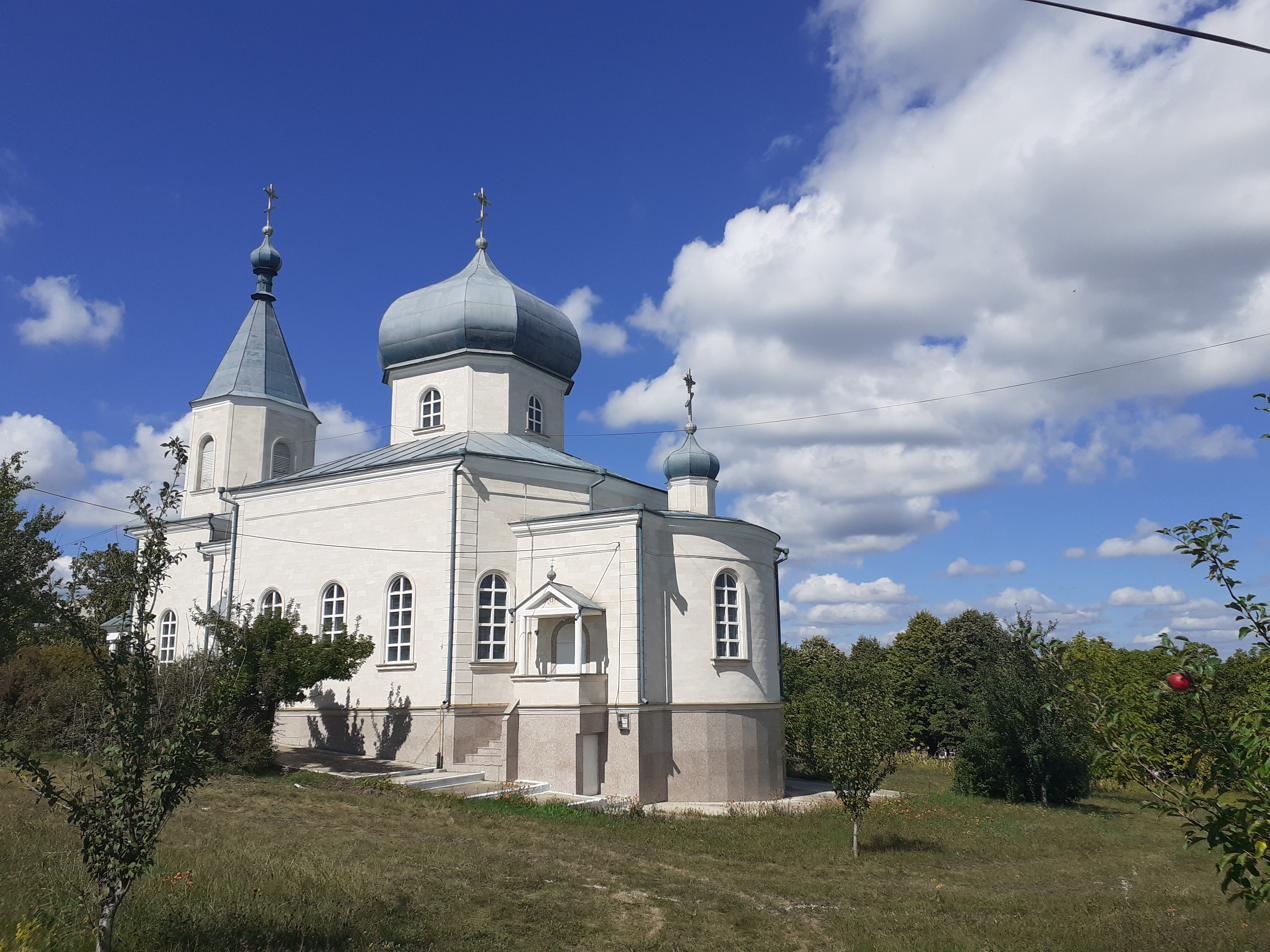
The "Sfântul Dumitru" church.

The relief of the village formed after the regression of the Sarmatian Sea, which disappeared about 5 million years ago. It is situated on a broad plateau-like hill that rises steeply from the north, and slopes towards the east. The highest elevation near the forest is 220 meters, while the lowest near Poiana Pinului is 80 meters.

Dănceni has a humid continental climate (Köppen climate classification Dfa) characterised by long, warm summers and cold, windy winters. Extreme seasonal variations are not uncommon. Winter minimum temperatures are often below 0 °C (32 °F), although they drop below −10 °C (14 °F) on some occasions, for short periods of time. Most winters also see a cold wave in the form of a blizzard, usually from the east, that brings about a large snowfall which can last a long time. In summer, the average maximum temperature is approximately 28 °C (82 °F), however, temperatures occasionally reach 35 to 40 °C (95 to 104 °F) in mid-summer. Although average precipitation and humidity during summer is relatively low, there are infrequent yet heavy storms, which can raise the humidity, and can cause flooding at lower elevations. June is the month of the most precipitation, contributing to an average total of 555 millimetres of rain per year. Dănceni sees a lot of sun compared to Western European cities of this latitude, especially during the hotter months. The average total for the year is around 2,277 hours.

Spring and autumn temperatures tend to have a large diurnal variation and the highs vary between 16 and 25 °C (61 and 77 °F), and precipitation during this time tends to be lower than in summer but with more frequent yet milder periods of rain.

Many different species of trees and grasses inhabit the region, with most trees being located at the higher elevations in the village, being a part of the large forest. Vineyards cover most of the hillsides, as grapes grow very well in the climate and landscape of central Moldova. Corn and wheat are also two popular crops, which have become staples of the Moldovan countryside, along with potatoes, tomatoes and peppers. Among the fruits, peaches, apricots, plums, apples, cherries, melons, and a large variety of berries are cultivated and harvested throughout the year, on the fields, and within household gardens.

== Attractions ==
In Dănceni, there are many tourist attractions located nearby the lake. These places take full advantage of the lake atmosphere, especially during summer, where many parties, festivals, and weddings are held. There are areas such as "Poiana Pinului", which is a row of pine trees near the lake, the dam at the end of the lake, which is popular for fishing, and several piers or decks on the bank of the lake. At the highest elevations of Dănceni is the large forest that is popular with picnics and is home to a mini zoo called "Bârlogul Ursului".

== Politics ==
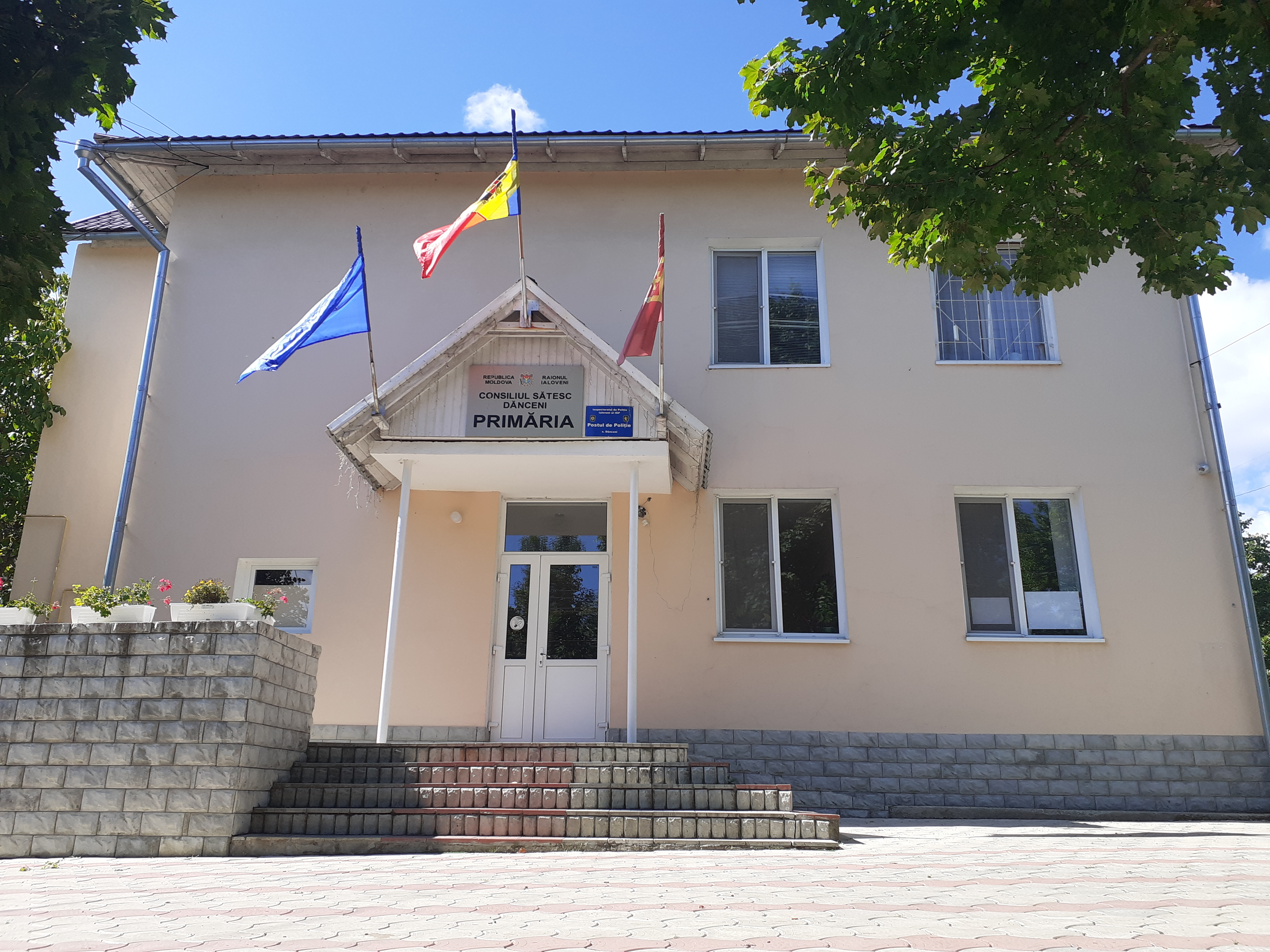
The town hall in Dănceni.

The composition of the Dănceni local council (11 councillors), elected on 5 November 2023, is as follows:

Party	Councillors	Structure
Party of Action and Solidarity	7	
Independent candidate EGOR VÎRLAN	1	
Independent candidate RADU BIVOL	1	
Party of Development and Consolidation of Moldova	1	
Independent candidate CĂLIN URSU	1	

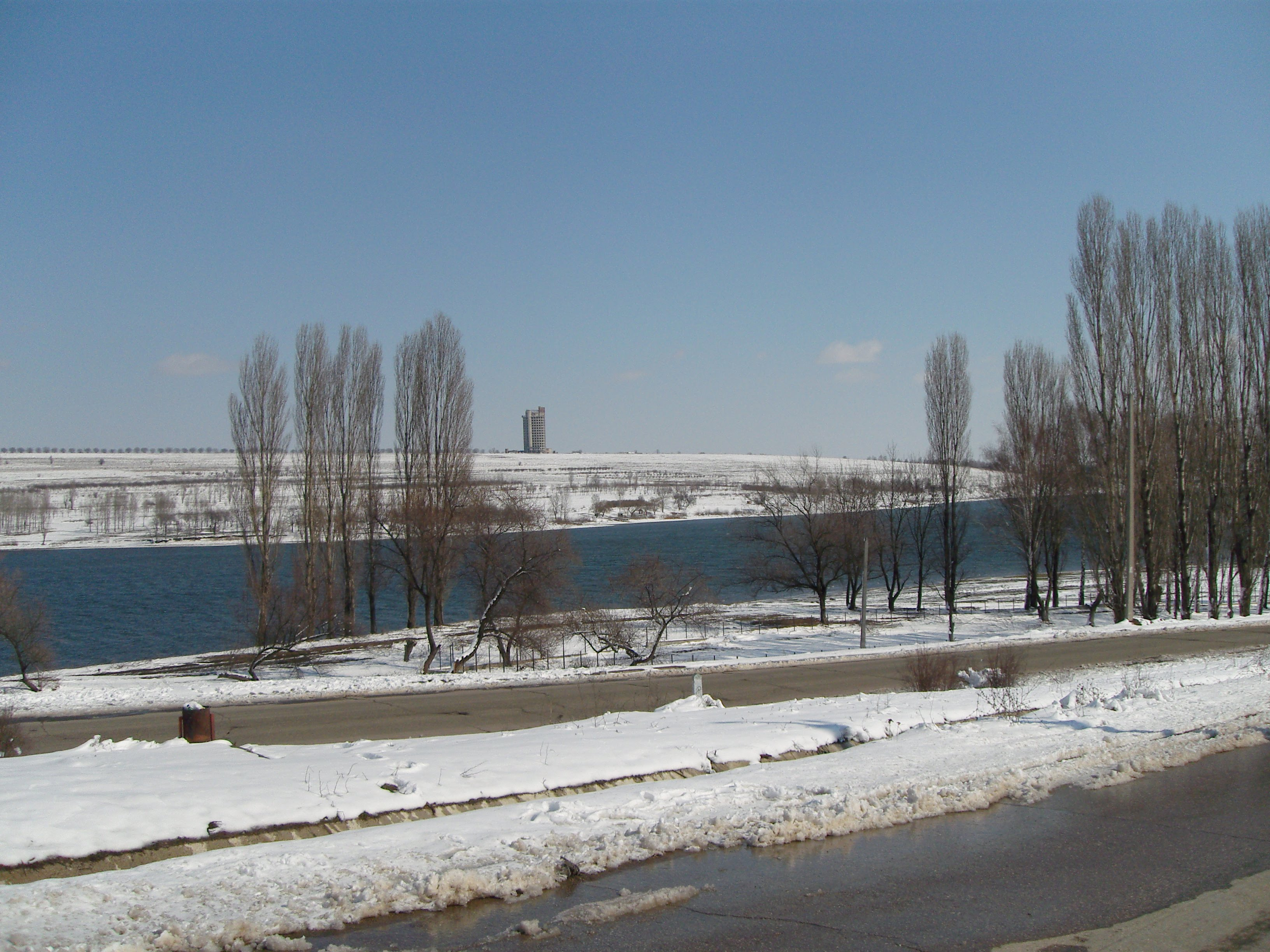
Lake Dănceni in the snow.

== Demographics ==
According to the 2014 census, the population of the town was 2406, which is a decrease compared to 2004, when 2796 inhabitants were recorded. Of the 2406, 1209 are men, and 1197 are women.

As with the rest of Moldova in the past two decades, Dănceni has seen mass emigration, contributing to the large population decrease.

Ethnic composition of Danceni (2014)
1. Moldovans* (86.2%)
2. Romanians (8.77%)
3. Russians (1.37%)
4. Ukrainians (1.25%)
5. Romani (1.08%)
6. Undeclared (0.67%)
7. Bulgarians (0.33%)
8. Others (0.25%)
:Linguistic composition of Dănceni (2014)
1. Moldovan* (50.8%)
2. Romanian (45.8%)
3. Russian (2.29%)
4. Undeclared/Other (0.96%)

Population by sex:

Year	Male	Female	Total
2004	1492	1304	2796
2014	1209	1197	2406

Evolution of the number of inhabitants:

Year	Number of inhabitants	Source
1904	1090	Zamfir Arbore Geographic Dictionary yr. 1904
2004	2796	2004 Moldovan census
2014	2406	2014 Moldovan census

Footnotes:

* There is an ongoing controversy regarding the ethnic identification of Moldovans and Romanians.

* Moldovan language is one of the two local names for the Romanian language in Moldova. In 2013, the Constitutional Court of Moldova interpreted that Article 13 of the constitution is superseded by the Declaration of Independence, thus giving official status to the name Romanian. In 2023, the Parliament of Moldova approved a law on referring to the national language as Romanian in all legislative texts and the constitution.

== Notable people ==
- Anatolii Buruian
- Teodor Neaga, member Sfatul Țării
- Andrei Vartic
