= Andrei Vartic =

Moldovan politician (1948–2009)

Andrei Vartic OR
- Born: October 21, 1948; Dănceni, Moldavian SSR, Soviet Union
- Died: June 2, 2009 (aged 60); Chişinău, Moldova
- Education: Moldova State University

Andrei Vartic (21 October 1948 – 2 June 2009) was a writer, physicist, and politician from Moldova.

== Biography ==
Andrei Vartic graduated from Moldova State University in 1971. He was a founder of the Democratic Movement of Moldova and served as member of the Parliament of Moldova. He was the founder and the director of the magazines "Quo Vadis", "Fără Machiaj", and "Dava International".

On June 10, he became the first Vice-President of the Democratic Forum of Romanians in Moldova. He was Program director at Vocea Basarabiei.

== Awards ==
- Andrei Vartic received post mortem the "Valeriu Cupcea" Prize from Boris Focşa in 2009.

== Works ==
- Cealaltă Românie, 2007
- Întrebarea cu privire la paleoinformatică, 2006
- Arhelologia paravanului de la Ripiceni - Izvor, 2003
- Purificarea istoriei din oglinda scenei, 2002
- O istorie geometrică a lui Homo Sapiens, 2000
- Variaţiuni pe o temă de Levi-Strauss, 2000
- Rolist Eneas Ner Eneat, 1999
- Weg und WWW. A Portret of the World with Heidegger, 1999
- Kobayashi against Basho, 1999
- Introducere la pictură, 1998
- Drumul spre Kogaionon, 1998
- Magistralele tehnologice ale civilizaţiei dacice, 1997
- Fierul-Piatra, Dacii-Timpul, 1997
- Catastrofa eliberării, 1996
- Ospeţele Nemuririi, 1994
- Paravanul dintre actor şi rol,1980
- Ion, 1976
- Scrisori din Bizanţ, 1975
- Arta iubirii, 1974
- Pod peste fluviu, 1973
- Drum prin rime, 1972

== Selected bibliography ==
Vartic, Andrei. Arheologia paravanului de la Risipeni - Izvor / Andrei Vartic. – Chişinău: Museum, 2003.– 96 p.
Vartic, Andrei. Arta iubirii / Andrei Vartic. – [S. l., s.n.], 1974. – (Ediţie „samizdat”).
Vartic, Andrei. Basarabia, rana de la hotarul de est / Andrei Vartic. – Sibiu: Ed. Univ. "Lucian Blaga" din Sibiu, 2008. – 42 p.
Vartic, Andrei. Basarabia, rana de la hotarul de est / Andrei Vartic; Povara şi osânda orgoliului / Nicolae Rusu. – Bacău: Vicovia, 2008. – 107 p. – (Contrast).
Vartic, Andrei. Catastrofa eliberării / Andrei Vartic. – Chişinău: Ed. Basarabia, 1996. – 247 p.
Vartic, Andrei. Cealaltă Românie: [Publicistică] / Andrei Vartic. – Ploieşti: Casa de presă Typodas Press, 2007. – 384 p.
Vartic, Andrei. Drum prin rime / Andrei Vartic. - [S. l., s.n.], 1972. – (Ediţie „samizdat”).
Vartic, Andrei. Drumul spre Kagaion / Andrei Vartic. – Chişinău: Ed. Basarabia, 1998. – 274 p.
Vartic, Andrei. Fierul - Piatra, Dacii - Timpul / Andrei Vartic. – Chişinău, Ed. Basarabia, 1997. – 216 p.
Vartic, Andrei. Introducere la pictură / Andrei Vartic. – Chişinău, Ed. Basarabia, 1998. – 106 p.
Vartic, Andrei. Ion / Andrei Vartic. – [S. l., s.n.], 1976. – (Ediţie „samizdat”).
Vartic, Andrei. Întrebarea cu privire la paleoinformatică / Andrei Vartic. – Chişinău: Ed. BNRM, 2006. – 216 p.
Vartic, Andrei. Jurnal baltic Andrei Vartic. – [S. l., s.n.], 1978. – (Ediţie „samizdat”).
Vartic, Andrei. Lupta cu moartea / Andrei Vartic. – [S. l., s.n.], 1979. – (Ediţie „samizdat”).
Vartic, Andrei. Magistralele tehnologice ale civilizaţiei dacice / Andrei Vartic. – Chişinău: Ed. Basarabia, 1997. - 72 p.
Vartic, Andrei. O istorie geometrică a lui Homo Sapiens / Andrei Vartic. – Chişinău: Ed. Dava Internaţional, 2000. - 164 p.
Vartic, Andrei. Ospeţele nemuririi / Andrei Vartic. – Chişinău: Ed. Quo Vadis, 1994.
Vartic, Andrei. Paravanul dintre actor şi rol / Andrei Vartic. – Ed. a 2-a.- Chişinău: Ed. Basarabia, 1997. - 103 p.
Vartic, Andrei. Paravanul dintre actor şi rol / Andrei Vartic. – [Ed. a 1-a]. – [S. l., s.n.], 1980. – (Ediţie „samizdat”).
Vartic, Andrei. Pod peste fluviu / Andrei Vartic. – [S. l., s.n.], 1974. – (Ediţie „samizdat”).
Vartic, Andrei. Purificarea istoriei din oglinda scenei: O mizanscenă de la 2002 în opera lui I.L. Caragiale / Andrei Vartic. – Chişinău: Ed. Basarabia, 2002. – 119 p.
Vartic, Andrei. [Mircea] Snegur / Andrei Vartic. – Chişinău: Ed. Basarabia, 1996. - 254 p.
Vartic, Andrei. Scrisori din Bizanţ / Andrei Vartic. – [S. l., s.n.], 1975. – (Ediţie „samizdat”).
Vartic, Andrei. Variaţiuni pe o temă de Levi-Strauss / Andrei Vartic. – Chişinău: Ed. Dava Internaţional, 2000. - 129 p.
* * *
Vartic, Andrei. Kobayashi Against Basho / Andrei Vartic. – Chişinău: Ed. Basarabia, 1999. - 180 p.
Vartic, Andrei. Rolist Eneas Ner Eneat / Andrei Vartic. – Chişinău: Ed. Basarabia, 1999. - 119 p.
Vartic, Andrei. Weg und WWW. A Portret of the World with Heidegger / Andrei Vartic. – Chişinău: Ed. Basarabia, 1999. - 296 p.
* * *
Vartic, Andrei. Limbă şi geopolitică la poporul de est al poporului Român: [Pref.] / Andrei Vartic // Nuţă, Ion. Limbă şi cultură românească în Basarabia / Ion Nuţă; pref. Andrei Vartic. – Bacău, Ed. Vicovia, 2007. –P. 5-22.
Vartic, Andrei. Supravieţuire prin memorie: [Prefaţă] / Andrei Vartic // Bobeică Constantin. : [Publicistică, eseuri] / Constantin Bobeică; pref. Andrei Vartic. – Chişinău: Ed. Prometeu, 2006. – P. 5-8.
* * *
Andrei Vartic: [Fişă bibliogr.] // Vartic, Andrei. Cealaltă Românie: [Publicistică] / Andrei Vartic. – Ploieşti: Casa de presă Typodas Press, 2007. – (P. 4 a cop.).
Marinescu, Ioan. Despre Andrei Vartic, în şapte rânduri // Vartic, Andrei. Cealaltă Românie: [Publicistică] / Andrei Vartic. – Ploieşti: Casa de presă Typodas Press, 2007. – 384 p.
Rău, Alexe. O carte scrisă la munte / Alexe Rău // Vartic, Andrei. Întrebarea cu privire la paleoinformatică / Andrei Vartic; pref. Alexe Rău. – Chişinău, Ed. BNRM. - P.3-7.
Ţau, Elena. Vartic, Andrei (21.X.1948, Dănceni, Chişinău) / Elena Ţau // Dicţionarul scriitorilor români din Basarabia. 1812-2006. – Chişinău: Prut Internaţional, 2007. – P. 462-463/

== Bibliography ==
- Articol de Vlad Pohilă publicat în Calendar Naţional 2008 / Biblioteca Naţională a Republicii Moldova. -- Chişinău: Ed. BNRM, 2008. -- P.343-347.
