= Andrei Prepeliță (footballer, born 1989) =

Moldovan footballer

Personal information
- Date of birth: 24 July 1989 (age 37)
- Place of birth: Dănceni, Moldova
- Height: 1.78 m (5 ft 10 in)
- Position: Defender

Team information
- Current team: CSF Spartanii Selemet
- Number: 2

Senior career*
| Years | Team | Apps | (Gls) |
| 2009–2011 | Sfântul Gheorghe | 36 | (3) |
| 2011–2014 | Saxan | 20 | (0) |
| 2014–2015 | Prut Leova | 17 | (0) |
| 2015– | Spartanii Selemet | 60 | (4) |
- * Club domestic league appearances and goals

Andrei Prepeliță (born 24 July 1989) is a Moldovan professional footballer who plays as a defender for Moldovan club CSF Spartanii Selemet.
