= Teodor Suruceanu =

Bessarabian politician

Member of the Moldovan Parliament
- In office 1917–1918

Personal details
- Born: Pojăreni

Teodor Suruceanu (born 1865, Pojăreni) was a Bessarabian politician.

== Biography ==
He served as Member of the Moldovan Parliament (1917–1918).

== Gallery ==
Moldovan stamp, 1998
