= Nicolae Suruceanu =

Bessarabian politician (1891–1969)

Member of the Moldovan Parliament
- In office November 21, 1917 – November 27, 1918

Personal details
- Born: 1891 Suruceni
- Died: 1969 (aged 77–78)

Nicolae Suruceanu (1891 – 1969) was a Bessarabian politician. He was born in Suruceni.

== Biography ==
He served as Member of the Moldovan Parliament (1917–1918).

== Gallery ==
Moldovan stamp, 1998

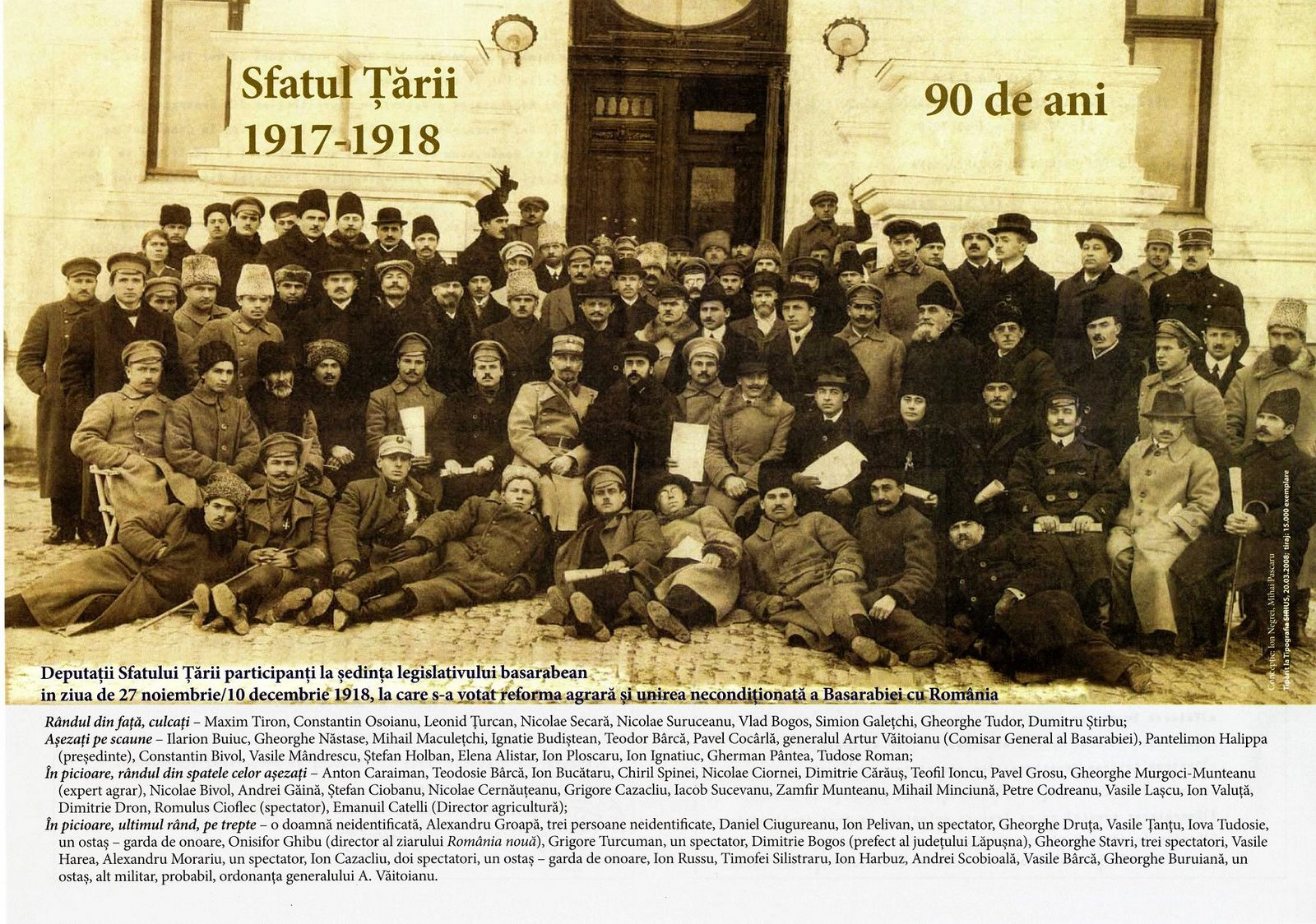
Sfatul Țării Palace, December 10, 1918
