= Teodor Neaga =

Bessarabian politician (1878–1941)

Member of the Moldovan Parliament
- In office 1917–1918

Personal details
- Born: 1878 Dănceni
- Died: 6 December 1941 (aged 62–63) Penza
- Party: National Liberal Party; People's Party

Teodor Neaga (1878, Dănceni – 6 December 1941, Penza) was a Bessarabian politician.

== Biography ==
He served as Member of the Moldovan Parliament (1917–1918).

== Gallery ==
Moldovan stamp, 1998

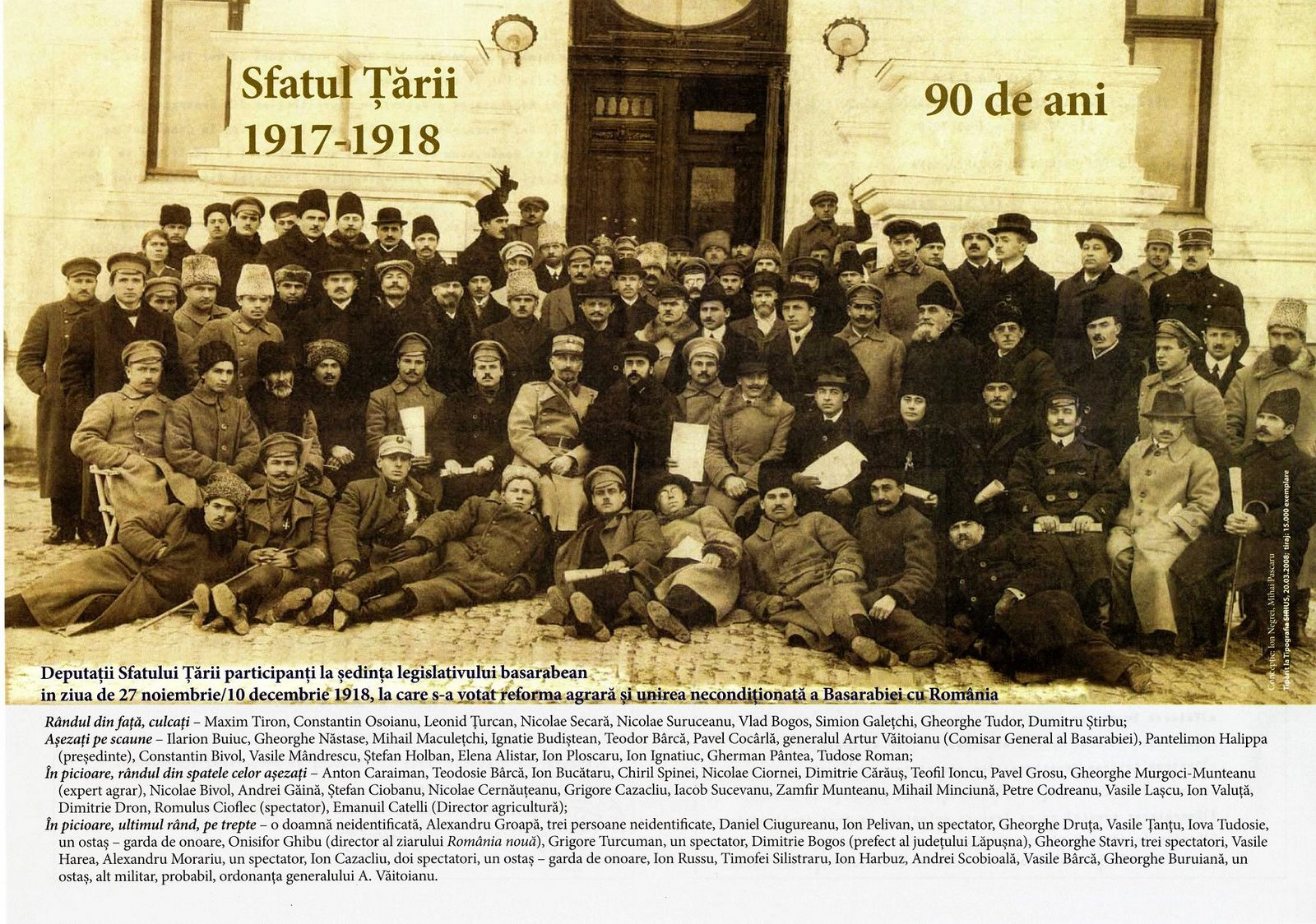
Sfatul Țării Palace, 10 December 1918

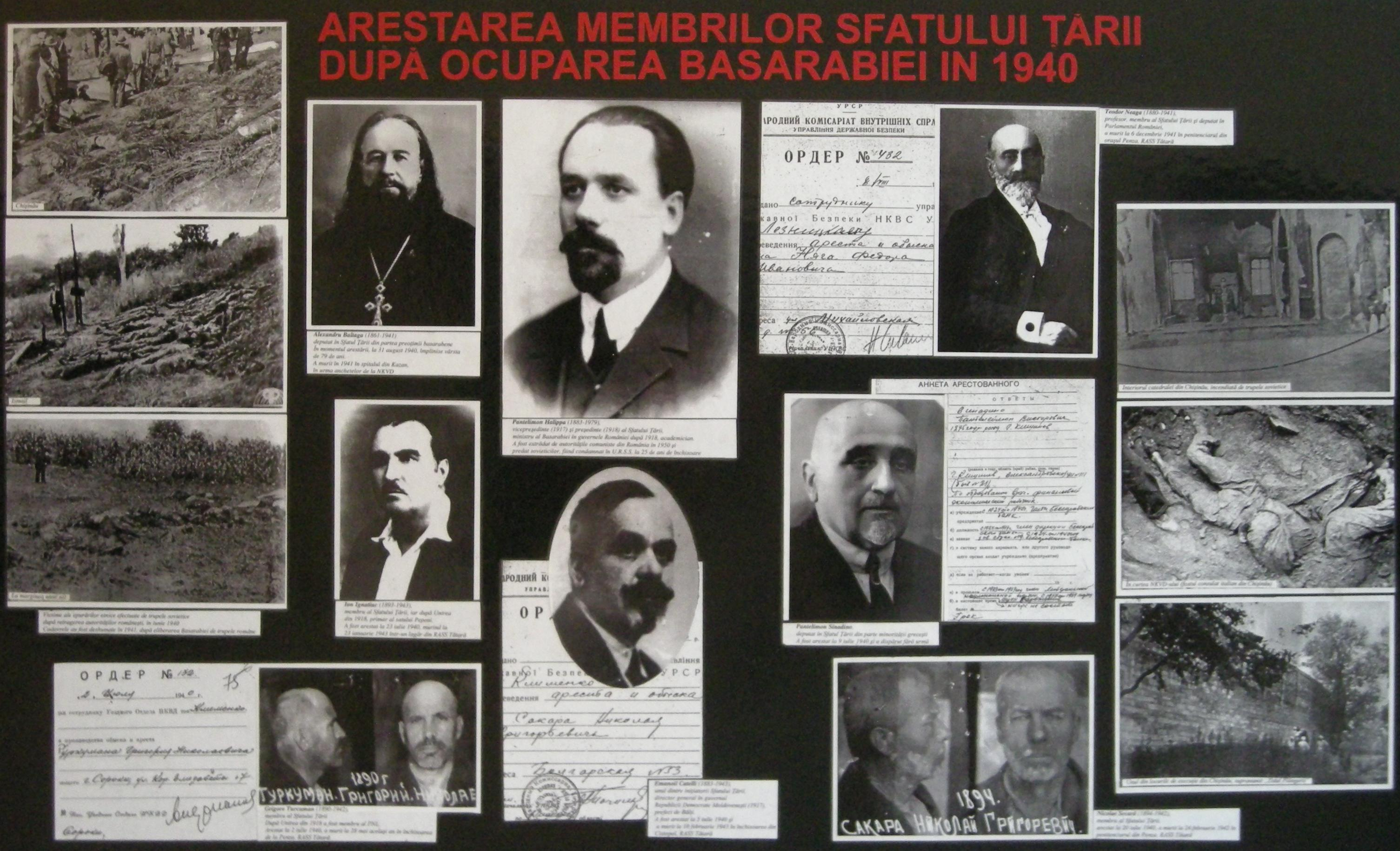
1940s persecutions against Sfatul Țării members

== Bibliography ==
- Alexandru Chiriac. Membrii Sfatului Ţării. 1917–1918. Dicţionar, Editura Fundaţiei Culturale Române, București, 2001.
