= Suruceni =

- Commune and village
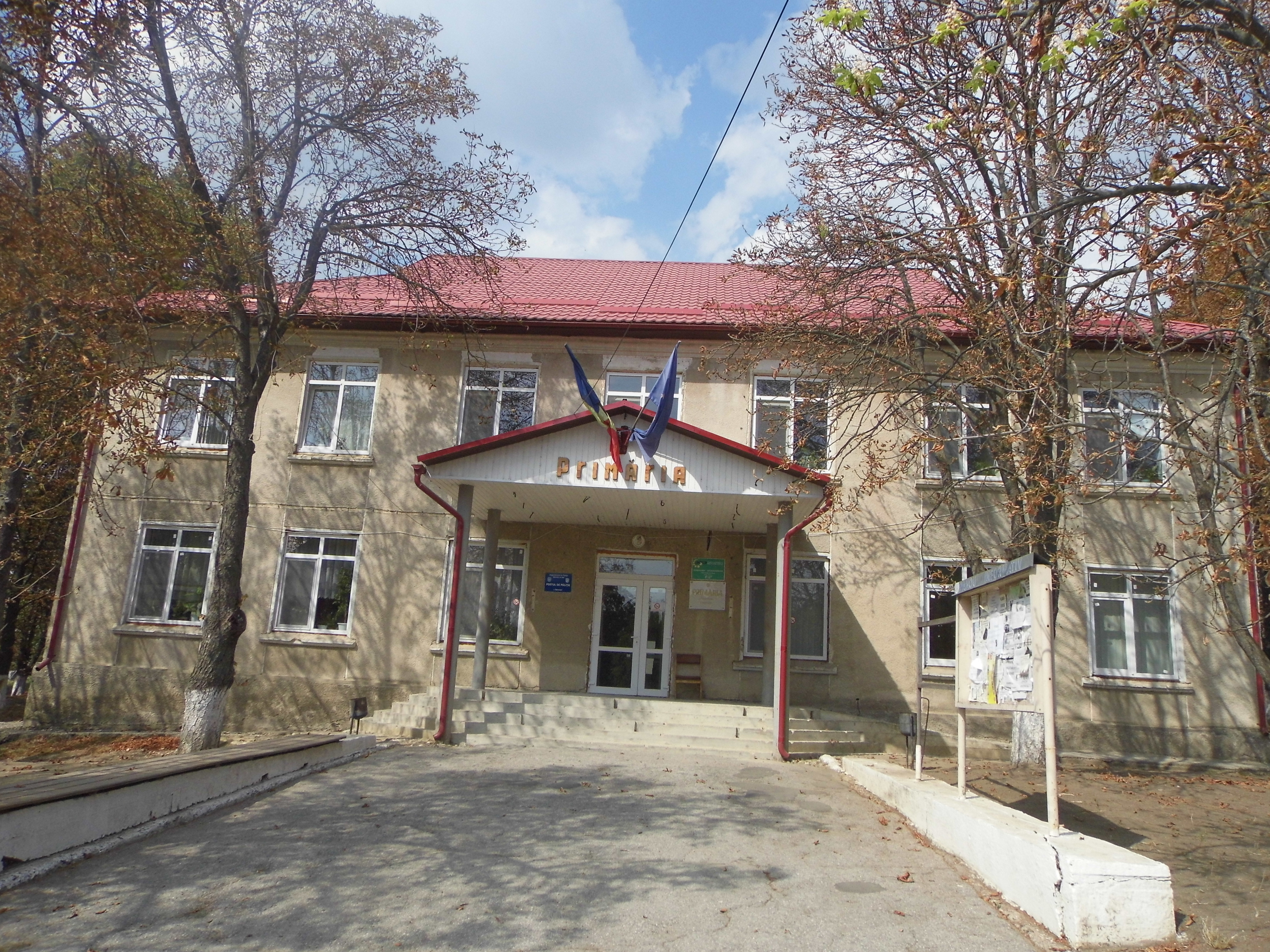
- Suruceni town hall.

- Location in Moldova
- Coordinates: 46°59′N 28°40′E
- Country: Moldova
- District: Ialoveni District

Government
  - Mayor: Sergiu Gorceac (PAS)

Area
  - Total: 2.18 km^{2} (0.84 sq mi)

Population (2014 census)
  - Total: 2,995
  - Density: 1,370/km^{2} (3,560/sq mi)
- Time zone: UTC+2 (EET)
  - Summer (DST): UTC+3 (EEST)

Suruceni is a village in Ialoveni District, Moldova, 22 km to the west from Chișinău. It sits on the bank of two retention basins called Lake Nimoreni, and Lake Suruceni. The village borders the Dănceni, Nimoreni, Chișinau, and Văsieni localities.

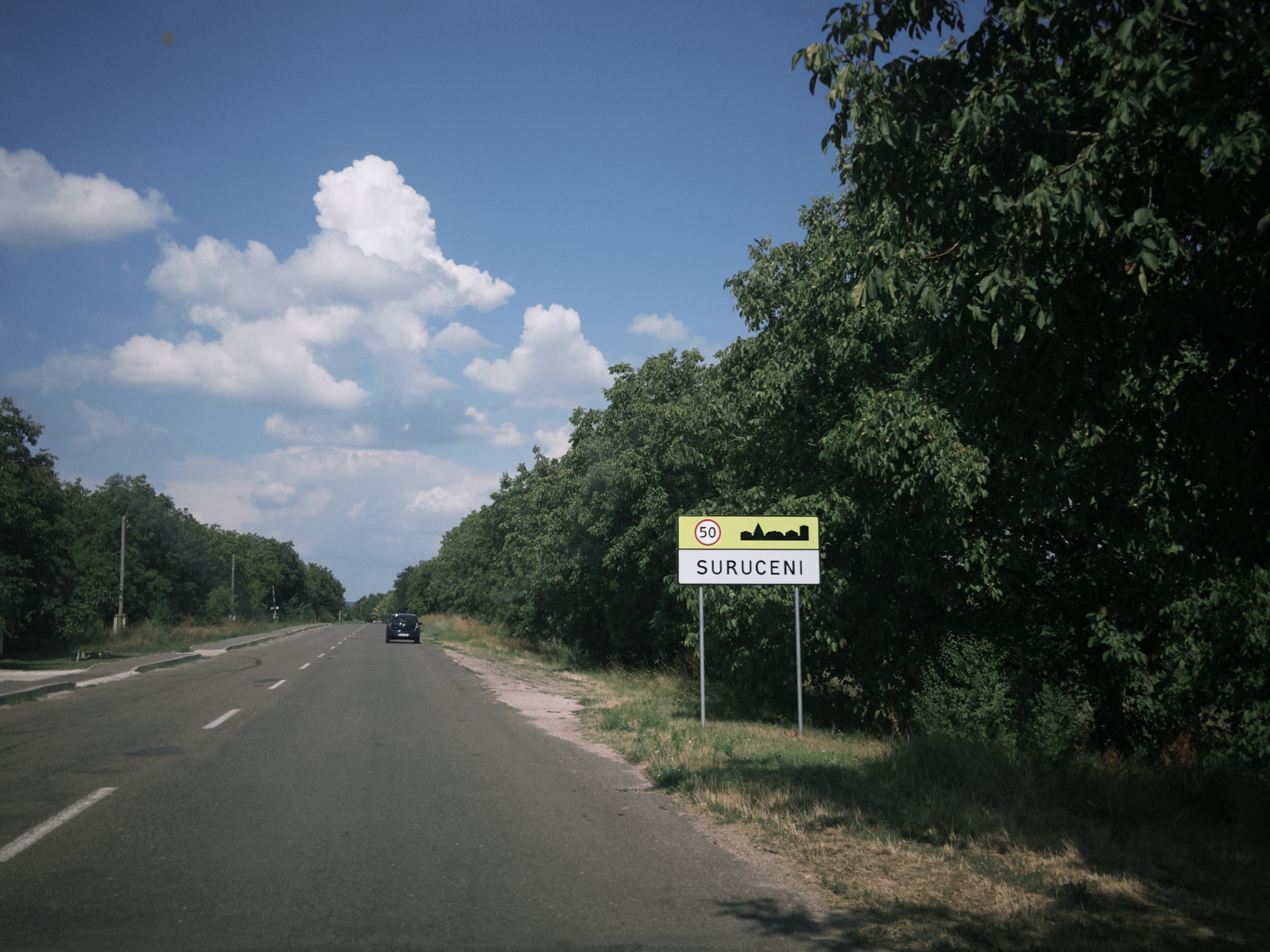
The entrance to Suruceni from Dănceni.

It has been the site, since 1785, of Suruceni Monastery of St George, a community of Orthodox nuns. The sisters farm land on the edge of the village, and maintain two monastic churches which are open to the public at certain times.

== Sport ==
FC Sfântul Gheorghe Suruceni was based in the village until its dissolution.

== Notable people ==
- Ion Suruceanu, a Moldovan singer.
- Nicolae Suruceanu, a Bessarabian politician.
- Vasile Ciorăscu, a Bessarabian politician
