= Ruseștii Noi =

Ruseștii Noi Ruseștii Vechi Rusești
- Commune
- Location within Moldova
- Coordinates: 46.9333333333°N 28.65°E
- Country: Moldova
- District: Ialoveni District

Government
  - Mayor: Diana Năstas (DA)

Area
  - Total: 0.781043 km^{2} (0.301562 sq mi)
- Elevation: 97 m (318 ft)

Population (2022)
  - Total: 3.105
- Time zone: UTC+2 (EET)
  - Summer (DST): UTC+3 (EEST)
- Postal code: MD-6825

Ruseștii Noi is a commune in Ialoveni District, Moldova. It is composed of two villages, Ruseștii Noi and Ruseștii Vechi.
