= Sociteni =

- Village
- Location within Moldova
- Coordinates: 46.9333333333°N 28.7166666667°E
- Country: Moldova
- District: Ialoveni District

Government
  - Mayor: Victor Goloman (PLDM)

Population (2014 census)
  - Total: 1,747
- Time zone: UTC+2 (EET)
  - Summer (DST): UTC+3 (EEST)

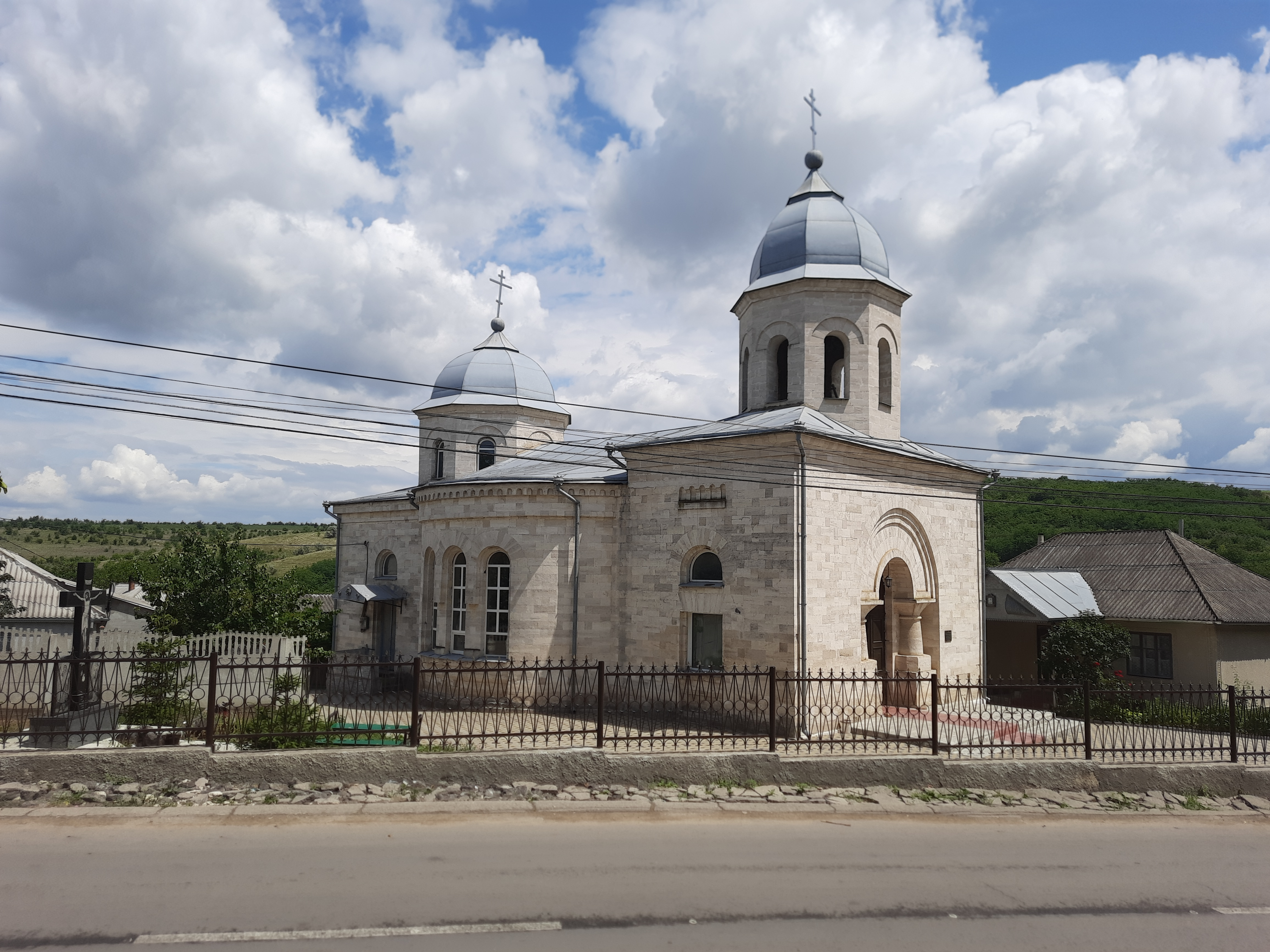
Church of St. Archangels Michael and Gabriel, Sociteni

Sociteni is a village in Ialoveni District, Moldova.
