= Kogaionon =

Holy mountain of the Geto-Dacians

See Kogaionon ungureanui for the mammal from the Upper Cretaceous.

Kogaionon was the holy mountain of the Geto-Dacians, the place where Zalmoxis stayed in a cave for three years. After his disappearance into Kogaionon, he was considered dead by the Getae but after three years he resurrected and showed himself to the people, who became convinced by his holy preaching when he emerged from Kogaionon.

Strabo claims that a river with the same name flowed in the vicinity.

One modern translation of Kogaionon is "sacred mountain", which would be connected to a probable Dacian word kaga meaning "sacred", attested in two early 2nd century inscriptions from Tomis.

Kogaionon's location is still under debate, but it may be in the area around the Dacian capital Sarmizegetusa Regia (there is a 2291m summit there called Gugu and there are speculations that it could be the holy mountain).
