= Postal codes in Moldova =

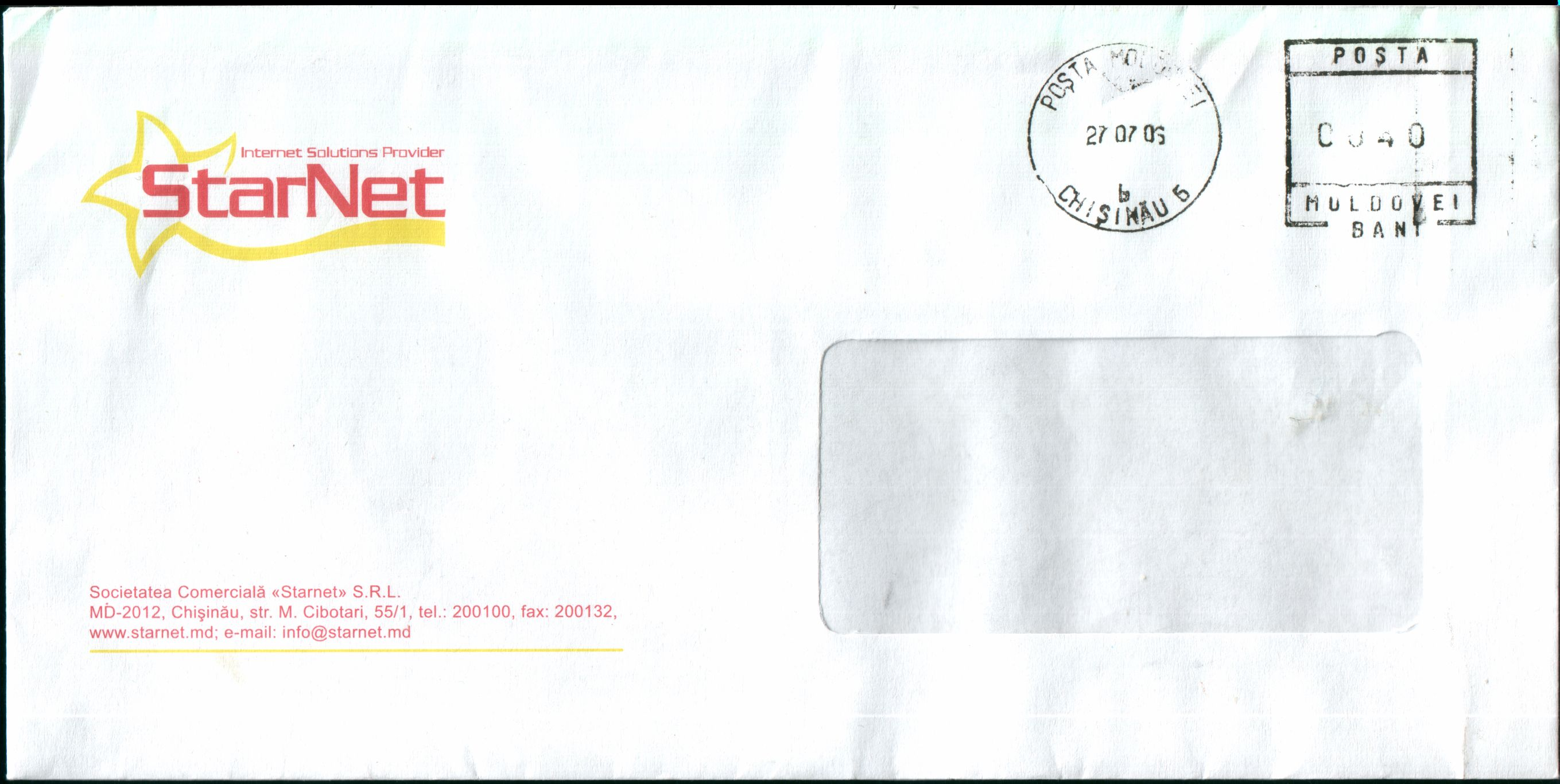
Moldovan postal cover, Starnet SRL.

Moldova's postal codes are alphanumeric, consisting of the letters MD followed by a dash followed by four digits, e.g. Chișinău MD-2001.

The first digit refers to a designated postal zone, the rest designate smaller administrative units or districts and streets within the municipal area.

== See also ==
- Official site of Poșta Moldovei
