= Pojăreni =

- Commune and village
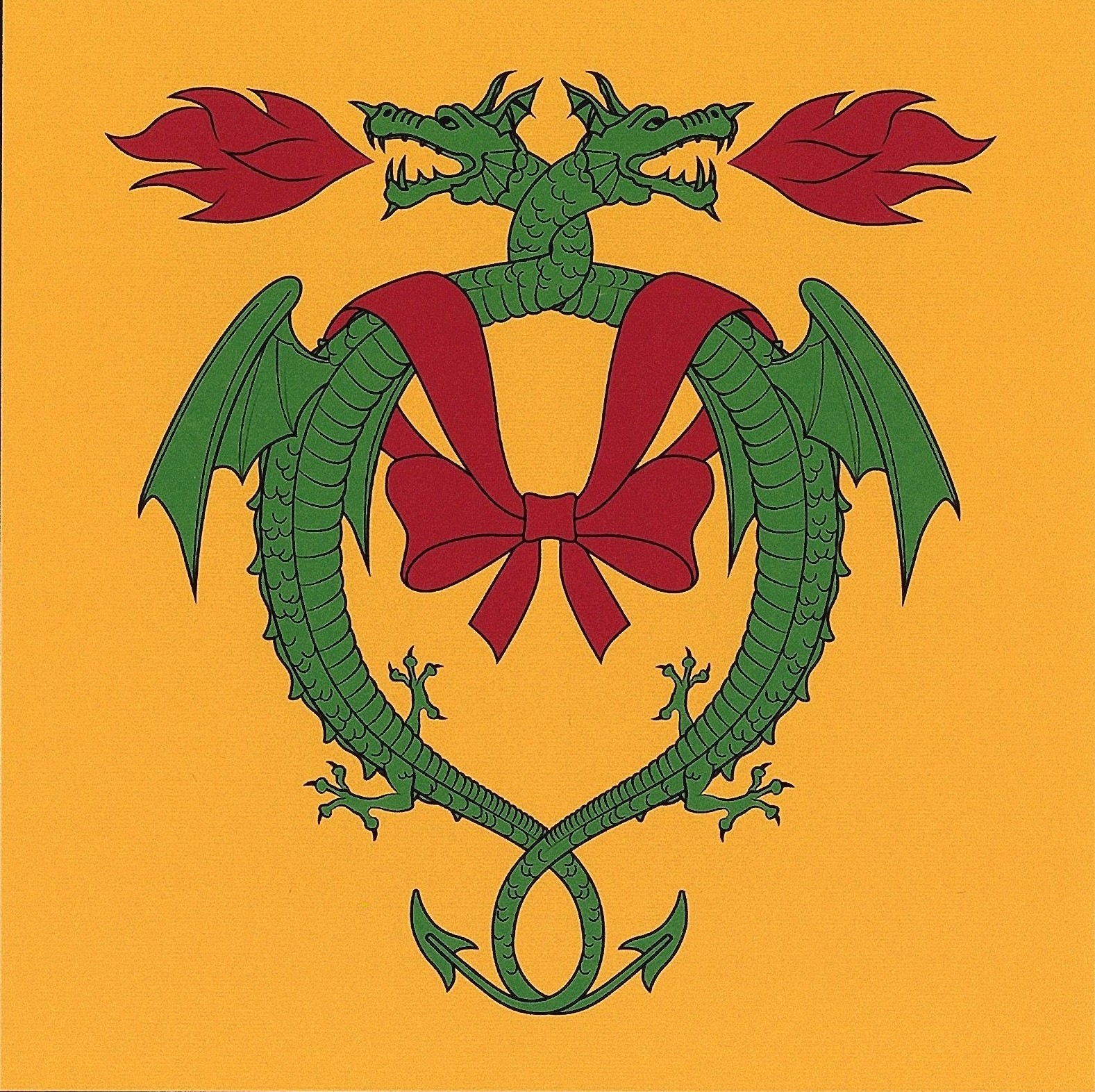
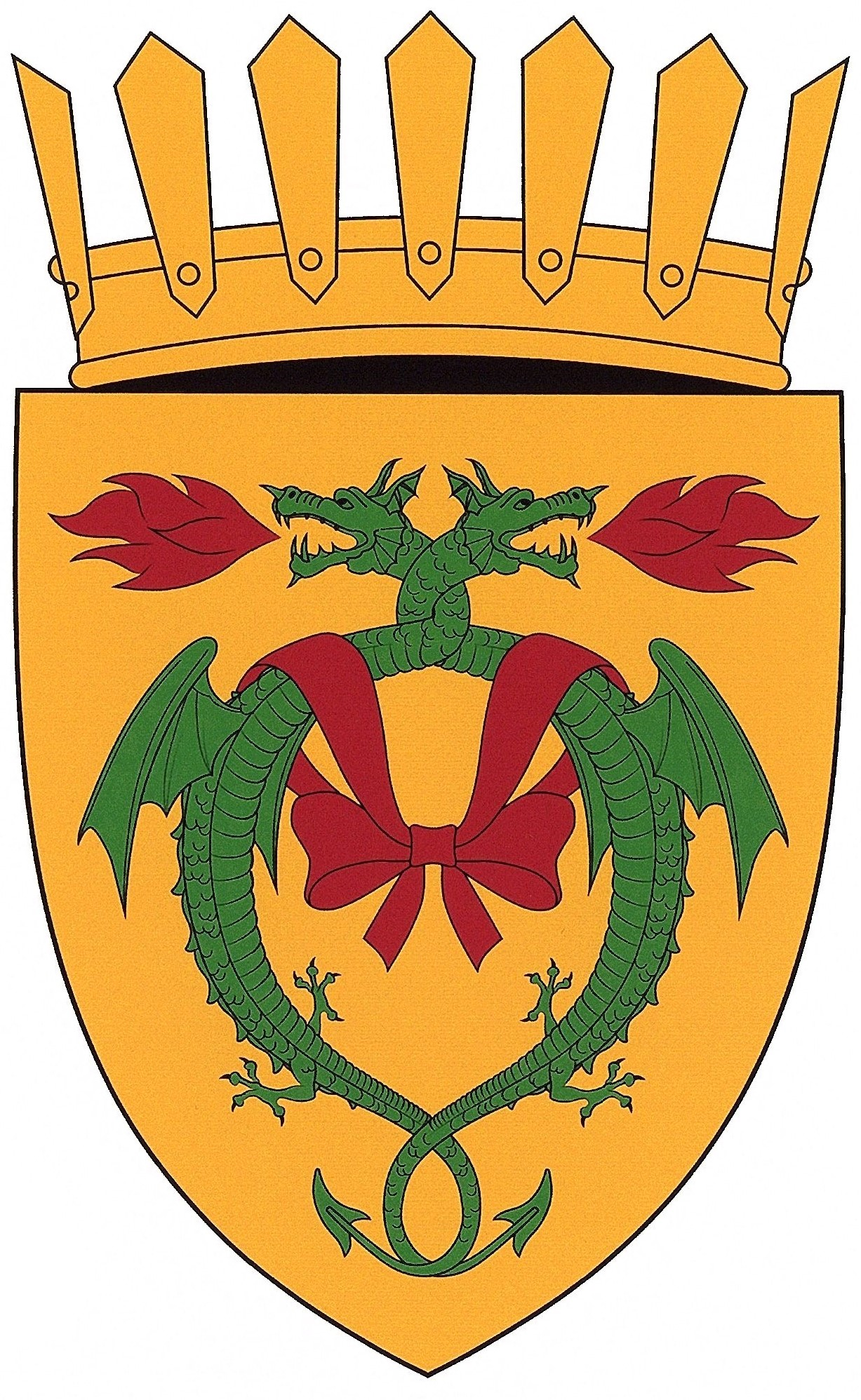
- Flag Seal

- Location in Moldova
- Coordinates: 46°53′N 28°42′E
- Country: Moldova
- District: Ialoveni District

Population (2014 census)
  - Total: 967
- Time zone: UTC+2 (EET)
  - Summer (DST): UTC+3 (EEST)

Pojăreni is a commune in Ialoveni District, Moldova.

== Notable people ==
- Teodor Suruceanu
